= 2006 European Touring Car Cup =

Motorsport contest

Seasons
- ← 2005 2007 →

Layout of the Autódromo do Estoril

The 2006 FIA European Touring Car Cup was the second running of the FIA European Touring Car Cup. It was held on 22 October 2006 at the Autódromo Fernanda Pires da Silva near Estoril in Portugal.

== Teams and drivers ==
Super 2000 class
Team	Car	No	Drivers
(United Kingdom) SEAT Sport UK	SEAT León	2	(United Kingdom) Jason Plato
(Sweden) Elgh Motorsport	BMW 320si	3	(Sweden) Carl Rosenblad
(Finland) Maarakennus M. Laivola Oy	SEAT Toledo Cupra	4	(Finland) Ari Laivola
Avtodom Racing - BMW Russia	BMW 320i	5	(Russia) Mikhail Ukhov
(Russia) Sport-Garage	Audi A4	6	(Russia) Alexey Dudukalo
(Sweden) Engström Motorsport	Honda Accord Euro R	7	(Sweden) Tomas Engström
(Germany) TFS Yaco Racing	Toyota Corolla T-Sport	8	(Germany) Philip Geipel
(Hong Kong) GR Asia	SEAT León	9	(Republic of Ireland) Emmet O'Brien
(Hong Kong) GR Asia	SEAT León	22	(United Kingdom) Ryan Sharp
BMW Team Italy-Spain	BMW 320si	10	(Spain) Félix Porteiro
BMW Team Italy-Spain	BMW 320si	11	(Italy) Alessandro Zanardi
(Switzerland) Maurer Motorsport	Chevrolet Lacetti	12	(Belgium) Vincent Radermecker
(Switzerland) Maurer Motorsport	Chevrolet Lacetti	14	(Portugal) Hugo Godinho
(Germany) Engstler Motorsport	BMW 320i	15	(Russia) Rustem Teregulov
(San Marino) ZeroCinque Motorsport	BMW 320i	18	(Portugal) Miguel Freitas
(Russia) MTS AC Racing	BMW 320i	19	(Russia) Vladimir Labazov
(Sweden) MA GP	Alfa Romeo 156	20	(Sweden) Mattias Andersson
(Sweden) WestCoast Racing	BMW 320i	21	(Sweden) Robin Rudholm
Super Production class
Avtodom Racing - BMW Russia	BMW 320i	52	(Russia) Vadim Kuzminykh
Avtodom Racing - BMW Russia	BMW 320i	57	(Russia) Andrey Romanov
(Russia) Sport-Garage	Volkswagen Golf IV GTi	53	(Russia) Sergey Krylov
(Russia) Sport-Garage	Volkswagen Golf IV GTi	61	(Russia) Alexander Lvov Jr.
(Russia) Sport-Garage	Volkswagen Golf IV GTi	62	(Russia) Timur Sadredinov
(Russia) Golden Motors	Honda Civic Type-R	54	(Russia) Alexander Lvov
(Russia) Golden Motors	Honda Civic Type-R	55	(Russia) Andrey Smetskiy
AMK FSO Russia	Opel Astra OPC	56	(Russia) Mikhail Zasadych
(Latvia) JH Motorsport	Honda Integra Type-R	58	(Latvia) Janis Horeliks
(Estonia) Saksa Auto	Skoda Octavia	59	(Estonia) Raimo Kulli
(San Marino) ZeroCinque Motorsport	BMW 320i	60	(San Marino) Stefano Valli

== Final standings ==
Pos	Driver	Race 1	Race 2	Pts
Super 2000
1	(United Kingdom) Ryan Sharp	1	1	**20**
2	(Republic of Ireland) Emmet O'Brien	2	2	**16**
3	(Sweden) Tomas Engström	6	3	**9**
4	(Sweden) Robin Rudholm	5	5	**8**
5	(Spain) Félix Porteiro	3	Ret	**6**
6	(Sweden) Carl Rosenblad	8	4	**6**
7	(Italy) Alessandro Zanardi	**4**	Ret	**5**
8	(Sweden) Mattias Andersson	7	6	**5**
9	(Portugal) Hugo Godinho	12	7	**2**
10	(Belgium) Vincent Radermecker	10	8	**1**
11	(Germany) Philip Geipel	9	Ret	**0**
12	(Russia) Mikhail Ukhov	11	9	**0**
13	(Finland) Ari Laivola	10	11	**0**
14	(Russia) Vladimir Labazov	13	20	**0**
15	(Portugal) Miguel Freitas	Ret	19	**0**
16	(Russia) Alexey Dudukalo	Ret	22	**0**
-	(Russia) Rustem Teregulov	DNS	DNS	-
-	(United Kingdom) Jason Plato	DNS	DNS	-
Super Production
1	(Russia) Alexander Lvov	14	10	**20**
2	(Russia) Timur Sadredinov	15	12	**14**
3	(Latvia) Janis Horeliks	17	14	**10**
4	(Estonia) Raimo Kulli	16	16	**9**
5	(San Marino) Stefano Valli	23	12	**8**
6	(Russia) Andrey Romanov	22	15	**5**
7	(Russia) Vadim Kuzminykh	19	21	**4**
8	(Russia) Andrey Smetskiy	20	18	**4**
9	(Russia) Mikhail Zasadych	21	17	**4**
9	(Russia) Sergey Krylov	Ret	NC	**0**
-	(Russia) Alexander Lvov Jr.	DNS	DNS	-
Pos	Driver	Race 1	Race 2	Pts

Colour	Result
Gold	Winner
Silver	Second place
Bronze	Third place
Green	Points classification
Blue	Non-points classification
Blue	Non-classified finish (NC)
Purple	Retired, not classified (Ret)
Red	Did not qualify (DNQ)
Red	Did not pre-qualify (DNPQ)
Black	Disqualified (DSQ)
White	Did not start (DNS)
White	Withdrew (WD)
White	Race cancelled (C)
Blank	Did not practice (DNP)
Blank	Did not arrive (DNA)
Blank	Excluded (EX)

**Bold** – Pole
Italics – Fastest Lap
