= 2007 FIA WTCC Race of France =

Race details
- Round 4 of 11 in the 2007 World Touring Car Championship at Circuit de Pau in Pau, France.
- Date: 3 June, 2007
- Location: Pau, France
- Course: Circuit de Pau; 2.769 kilometres (1.721 mi)

Race One
- Laps: 19
Pole position
Driver		(Switzerland) Alain Menu	Chevrolet RML
Time		1:21.930	
Podium
First		(Switzerland) Alain Menu	Chevrolet RML
Second		(France) Yvan Muller	SEAT Sport
Third		(Portugal) Tiago Monteiro	SEAT Sport
Fastest Lap
Driver		(Switzerland) Alain Menu	Chevrolet RML
Time		1:23.054	

Race Two
- Laps: 18
Podium
First		(Brazil) Augusto Farfus	BMW Team Germany
Second		(United Kingdom) Andy Priaulx	BMW Team UK
Third		(Portugal) Tiago Monteiro	SEAT Sport
Fastest Lap
Driver		(Brazil) Augusto Farfus	BMW Team Germany
Time		1:24.190	

The 2007 FIA WTCC Race of France was the fourth round of the 2007 World Touring Car Championship season and the third running of the FIA WTCC Race of France. It was held on 3 June 2007 at the temporary Circuit de Pau street circuit in Pau, France. It was the headline event of the 2007 Pau Grand Prix. The first race was won by Alain Menu, whilst the second race was won by Augusto Farfus.

== Classification ==
=== Qualifying ===
Pos.	No.	Name	Team	Car	Class	Time
1	8	(Switzerland) Alain Menu	Chevrolet RML	Chevrolet Lacetti		1:21.930
2	12	(France) Yvan Muller	SEAT Sport	SEAT León		1:22.328
3	18	(Portugal) Tiago Monteiro	SEAT Sport	SEAT León		1:22.391
4	7	(Italy) Nicola Larini	Chevrolet RML	Chevrolet Lacetti		1:22.416
5	6	(United Kingdom) Robert Huff	Chevrolet RML	Chevrolet Lacetti		1:22.458
6	1	(United Kingdom) Andy Priaulx	BMW Team UK	BMW 320si		1:22.491
7	9	(Spain) Jordi Gené	SEAT Sport	SEAT León		1:22.591
8	5	(Spain) Félix Porteiro	BMW Team Italy-Spain	BMW 320si		1:22.669
9	16	(Netherlands) Oliver Tielemans	N.Technology	Alfa Romeo 156		1:22.865
10	20	(Netherlands) Tom Coronel	GR Asia	SEAT León		1:22.948
11	15	(United Kingdom) James Thompson	N.Technology	Alfa Romeo 156		1:22.952
12	24	(France) Anthony Beltoise	Exagon Engineering	SEAT León	I	1:23.055
13 ^{1}	3	(Brazil) Augusto Farfus	BMW Team Germany	BMW 320si		1:22.379
14	10	(Mexico) Michel Jourdain Jr.	SEAT Sport	SEAT León		1:23.094
15	26	(Italy) Stefano D'Aste	Wiechers-Sport	BMW 320si	I	1:23.096
16	2	(Germany) Jörg Müller	BMW Team Germany	BMW 320si		1:23.127
17	4	(Italy) Alessandro Zanardi	BMW Team Italy-Spain	BMW 320si		1:23.146
18 ^{1}	11	(Italy) Gabriele Tarquini	SEAT Sport	SEAT León		1:22.634
19	31	(Spain) Sergio Hernández	Scuderia Proteam Motorsport	BMW 320si	I	1:23.495
20	33	(Portugal) Miguel Freitas	Racing for Belgium	Alfa Romeo 156	I	1:23.967
21	22	(Italy) Maurizio Ceresoli	GR Asia	SEAT León	I	1:24.113
22	21	(Republic of Ireland) Emmet O'Brien	GR Asia	SEAT León	I	1:24.194
23	30	(Italy) Luca Rangoni	Scuderia Proteam Motorsport	BMW 320si	I	1:24.273
24	23	(Belgium) Pierre-Yves Corthals	Exagon Engineering	SEAT León	I	3:18.321
-	19	(Italy) Roberto Colciago	SEAT Sport Italia	SEAT León	I	no time

Notes
1. – Both Farfus and Tarquini were handed ten-place grid penalties following qualifying.

=== Race 1 ===
Pos.	No.	Name	Team	Class	Laps	Time / Retired	Grid
1	8	(Switzerland) Alain Menu	Chevrolet RML		19		1
2	12	(France) Yvan Muller	SEAT Sport		19	+ 2.260 s	2
3	18	(Portugal) Tiago Monteiro	SEAT Sport		19	+ 3.808 s	3
4	6	(United Kingdom) Robert Huff	Chevrolet RML		19	+ 9.194 s	5
5	5	(Spain) Félix Porteiro	BMW Team Italy-Spain		19	+ 11.375 s	8
6	1	(United Kingdom) Andy Priaulx	BMW Team UK		19	+ 11.803 s	6
7	3	(Brazil) Augusto Farfus	BMW Team Germany		19	+ 12.683 s	13
8	9	(Spain) Jordi Gené	SEAT Sport		19	+ 19.328 s	7
9	20	(Netherlands) Tom Coronel	GR Asia		19	+ 22.417 s	10
10	15	(United Kingdom) James Thompson	N.Technology		19	+ 24.804 s	11
11	2	(Germany) Jörg Müller	BMW Team Germany		19	+ 25.506 s	16
12	10	(Mexico) Michel Jourdain Jr.	SEAT Sport		19	+ 27.254 s	14
13	26	(Italy) Stefano D'Aste	Wiechers-Sport	I	19	+ 27.807 s	15
14	31	(Spain) Sergio Hernández	Scuderia Proteam Motorsport	I	19	+ 29.598 s	19
15	24	(France) Anthony Beltoise	Exagon Engineering	I	19	+ 30.162 s	12
16	33	(Portugal) Miguel Freitas	Racing for Belgium	I	19	+ 43.703 s	20
17	21	(Republic of Ireland) Emmet O'Brien	GR Asia	I	19	+ 46.478 s	22
18	23	(Belgium) Pierre-Yves Corthals	Exagon Engineering	I	19	+ 47.452 s	24
19	11	(Italy) Gabriele Tarquini	SEAT Sport		18	+ 1 lap	18
Ret	7	(Italy) Nicola Larini	Chevrolet RML		12	Retired	4
Ret	4	(Italy) Alessandro Zanardi	BMW Team Italy-Spain		11	Retired	17
Ret	22	(Italy) Maurizio Ceresoli	GR Asia	I	9	Retired	21
Ret	30	(Italy) Luca Rangoni	Scuderia Proteam Motorsport	I	6	Retired	23
Ret	16	(Netherlands) Olivier Tielemans	N.Technology		0	Retired	9
DNS	19	(Italy) Roberto Colciago	SEAT Sport Italia	I		Did Not Start	
Fastest Lap: Alain Menu (Chevrolet RML) - 1:23.054

=== Race 2 ===
Pos.	No.	Name	Team	Class	Laps	Time / Retired	Grid
1	8	(Brazil) Augusto Farfus	BMW Team Germany		21		2
2	1	(United Kingdom) Andy Priaulx	BMW Team UK		21	+ 0.462 s	3
3	18	(Portugal) Tiago Monteiro	SEAT Sport		21	+ 5.185 s	6
4	6	(United Kingdom) Robert Huff	Chevrolet RML		21	+ 5.625 s	5
5	9	(Spain) Jordi Gené	SEAT Sport		21	+ 13.018 s	1
6	12	(France) Yvan Muller	SEAT Sport		21	+ 14.476 s	7
7	15	(United Kingdom) James Thompson	N.Technology		21	+ 20.861 s	10
8	8	(Switzerland) Alain Menu	Chevrolet RML		21	+ 21.160 s	8
9	4	(Italy) Alessandro Zanardi	BMW Team Italy-Spain		21	+ 22.447 s	21
10	2	(Germany) Jörg Müller	BMW Team Germany		21	+ 22.643 s	11
11	7	(Italy) Nicola Larini	Chevrolet RML		21	+ 25.130 s	20
12	11	(Italy) Gabriele Tarquini	SEAT Sport		21	+ 25.557 s	19
13	23	(Belgium) Pierre-Yves Corthals	Exagon Engineering	I	21	+ 30.457 s	18
14	24	(France) Anthony Beltoise	Exagon Engineering	I	21	+ 37.312 s	15
15	22	(Italy) Maurizio Ceresoli	GR Asia	I	21	+ 1:00.427 s	22
16	16	(Netherlands) Olivier Tielemans	N.Technology		20	+ 1 lap	24
Ret	30	(Italy) Luca Rangoni	Scuderia Proteam Motorsport	I	19	Retired	23
Ret	10	(Mexico) Michel Jourdain Jr.	SEAT Sport		14	Retired	12
Ret	20	(Netherlands) Tom Coronel	GR Asia		13	Retired	9
Ret	5	(Spain) Félix Porteiro	BMW Team Italy-Spain		10	Retired	4
Ret	26	(Italy) Stefano D'Aste	Wiechers-Sport	I	2	Retired	13
Ret	31	(Spain) Sergio Hernández	Scuderia Proteam Motorsport	I	2	Retired	14
Ret	33	(Portugal) Miguel Freitas	Racing for Belgium	I	2	Retired	16
Ret	21	(Republic of Ireland) Emmet O'Brien	GR Asia	I	2	Retired	17
DNS	19	(Italy) Roberto Colciago	SEAT Sport Italia	I		Did Not Start	
Fastest Lap: Augusto Farfus (BMW Team Germany) - 1:24.190
