= Pierre-Yves Corthals =

Auto racer

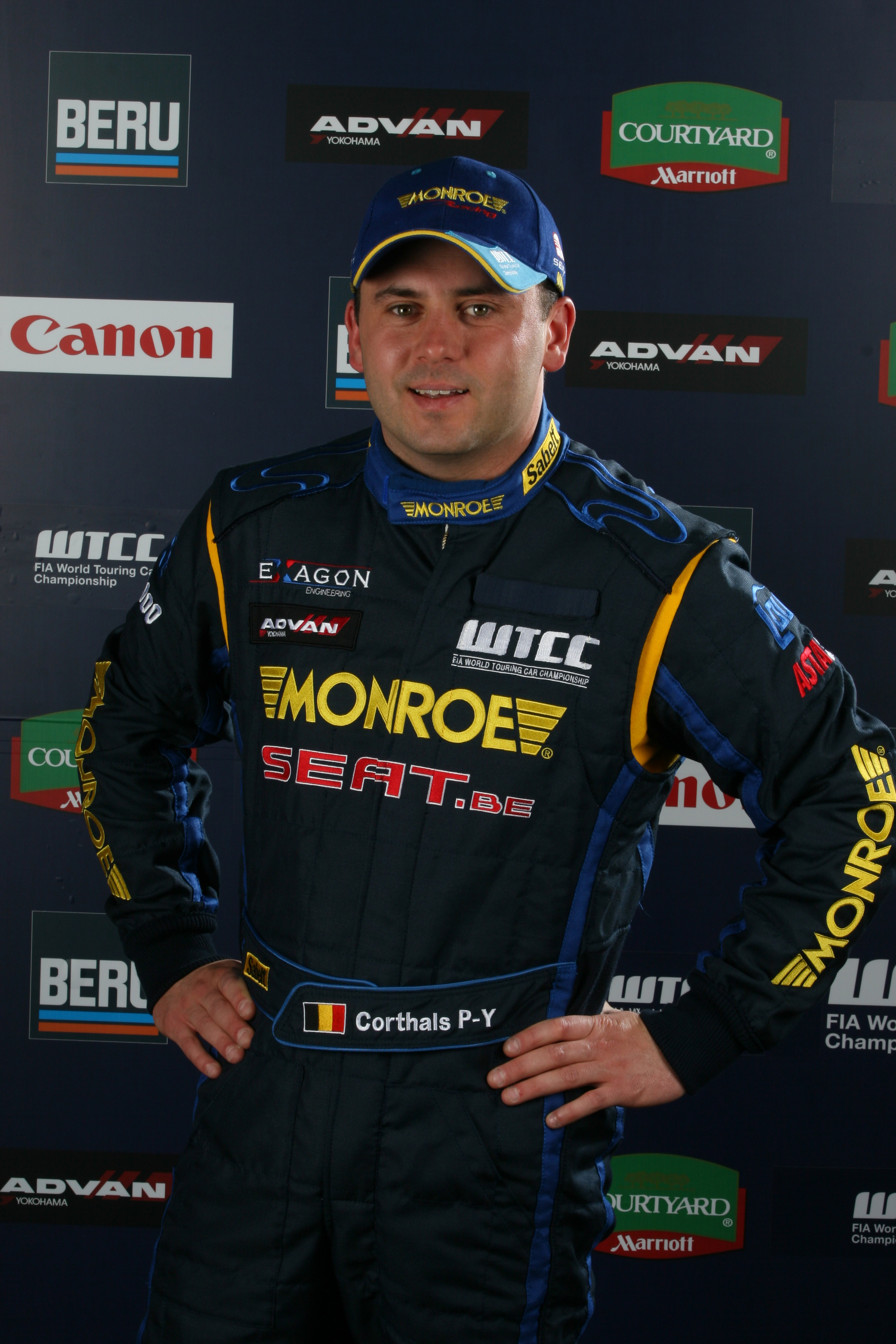
PY Corthals

Pierre-Yves Corthals (born 23 October 1975) is a Belgian auto racing driver.

== Career ==
After competing in karting, Corthals began racing in the Belgian Renault Clio Cup in 1994, which he went on to win for three consecutive years between 1995 and 1997, and won it again in 2000 and 2004. He won the International Clio Cup in 2001, ahead of Alessandro Balzan and Jeroen Bleekemolen.

In 2001, Corthals competed in two rounds of the European Touring Car Championship, once for BMW Team RBM at Donington Park, and once for Carly Motorsport at Circuit de Spa-Francorchamps, finishing the first race in sixth place.

Corthals began competing in the World Touring Car Championship in 2006, for JAS Motorsport in a Honda Accord, finishing seventh in the Independents' Trophy.

Corthals moved onto Exagon Engineering in 2007, driving a SEAT León. He improved to finish third in the Independents' Trophy standings. He remained with Exagon for 2008, finishing fourth in the Independents' standings. He did not return in 2009, instead competing in the Belgian Touring Car Series.

Corthals is a regular competitor in the 24 Hours of Spa.

== Racing record ==
=== Complete World Touring Car Championship results ===
(key) (Races in bold indicate pole position) (Races in italics indicate fastest lap)

| Year | Team | Car | 1 | 2 | 3 | 4 | 5 | 6 | 7 | 8 | 9 | 10 | 11 | 12 | 13 | 14 | 15 | 16 | 17 | 18 | 19 | 20 | 21 | 22 | 23 | 24 | DC | Points |
|---|---|---|---|---|---|---|---|---|---|---|---|---|---|---|---|---|---|---|---|---|---|---|---|---|---|---|---|---|
| 2006 | JAS Motorsport | Honda Accord Euro R | ITA; 1; 22 | ITA; 2 DNS | FRA; 1; 16 | FRA; 2 Ret | GBR; 1; 17 | GBR; 2 Ret | GER; 1 Ret | GER; 2 DNS | BRA; 1 | BRA; 2 | MEX; 1; 13 | MEX; 2; 10 | CZE; 1; 16 | CZE; 2; 16 | TUR; 1; 11 | TUR; 2; 19 | ESP; 1; 12 | ESP; 2; 16 | MAC; 1 | MAC; 2 | | | | | NC | 0 |
| 2007 | Exagon Engineering | SEAT León | BRA; 1; 10 | BRA; 2; 9 | NED; 1; 14 | NED; 2; 15 | ESP; 1; 13 | ESP; 2; 18 | FRA; 1; 16 | FRA; 2; 13 | CZE; 1; 12 | CZE; 2; 15 | POR; 1; 13 | POR; 2; 8 | SWE; 1; 22 | SWE; 2; 23 | GER; 1 Ret | GER; 2 DNS | GBR; 1; 8 | GBR; 2; 10 | ITA; 1 DSQ | ITA; 2 DSQ | MAC; 1 Ret | MAC; 2; 13 | | | 19th | 3 |
| 2008 | Exagon Engineering | SEAT León TFSI | BRA; 1; 13 | BRA; 2; 18 | MEX; 1; 12 | MEX; 2; 13 | ESP; 1 Ret | ESP; 2; 12 | FRA; 1 Ret | FRA; 2; 21 | CZE; 1; 17 | CZE; 2; 15 | POR; 1; 12 | POR; 2; 19 | GBR; 1; 14 | GBR; 2; 16 | GER; 1; 25† | GER; 2; 12 | EUR; 1; 14 | EUR; 2; 13 | ITA; 1; 12 | ITA; 2 Ret | JPN; 1 | JPN; 2 | MAC; 1 | MAC; 2 | 25th | 0 |
| 2010 | Exagon Engineering | SEAT León 2.0 TFSI | BRA; 1 | BRA; 2 | MAR; 1 | MAR; 2 | ITA; 1 | ITA; 2 | BEL; 1; 12 | BEL; 2; 15 | POR; 1 | POR; 2 | GBR; 1 | GBR; 2 | CZE; 1 | CZE; 2 | GER; 1 | GER; 2 | ESP; 1 | ESP; 2 | JPN; 1 | JPN; 2 | MAC; 1 | MAC; 2 | | | NC | 0 |

^{†} Driver did not finish the race, but was classified as he completed over 90% of the race distance.

=== Complete TCR International Series results ===
(key) (Races in bold indicate pole position) (Races in italics indicate fastest lap)

| Year | Team | Car | 1 | 2 | 3 | 4 | 5 | 6 | 7 | 8 | 9 | 10 | 11 | 12 | 13 | 14 | 15 | 16 | 17 | 18 | 19 | 20 | 21 | 22 | DC | Points |
|---|---|---|---|---|---|---|---|---|---|---|---|---|---|---|---|---|---|---|---|---|---|---|---|---|---|---|
| 2016 | Ferry Monster Autosport | SEAT León Cup Racer | BHR; 1 | BHR; 2 | EST; 1 | EST; 2 | SPA; 1 Ret | SPA; 2; 10 | IMO; 1 | IMO; 2 | SAL; 1 | SAL; 2 | OSC; 1 | OSC; 2 | SOC; 1 | SOC; 2 | CHA; 1 | CHA; 2 | MRN; 1 | MRN; 2 | SEP; 1 | SEP; 2 | MAC; 1 | MAC; 2 | 36th | 1 |
| 2017 | DG Sport Compétition | Opel Astra TCR | RIM; 1; 12 | RIM; 2; 8 | BHR; 1; 5 | BHR; 2; 11 | SPA; 1; 10 | SPA; 2 Ret | MNZ; 1; 17† | MNZ; 2; 14 | SAL; 1 | SAL; 2 | HUN; 1 | HUN; 2 | OSC; 1 | OSC; 2 | CHA; 1 | CHA; 2 | ZHE; 1 | ZHE; 2 | DUB; 1 | DUB; 2 | | | 24th | 19 |

^{†} Driver did not finish the race, but was classified as he completed over 90% of the race distance.

=== TCR Spa 500 results ===
| Year | Team | Co-Drivers | Car | Class | Laps | Pos. | Class Pos. |
|---|---|---|---|---|---|---|---|
| 2019 | (Belgium) Burton Racing | (Belgium) Caren Burton (Belgium) Armand Fumal (Belgium) Oliver Meurens (Belgium) Philippe Steveny | Peugeot 308 TCR | **Am** | 436 | 6th | **1st** |
