= 2005 European Touring Car Cup =

Motorsport contest

Seasons
- ← 2004 2006 →

Layout of the ACI Vallelunga Circuit

The 2005 FIA European Touring Car Cup was the first running of the FIA European Touring Car Cup. It was held on 16 October 2005 at the ACI Vallelunga Circuit near Rome in Italy.

== Teams and drivers ==
Super 2000 class
Team	Car	No	Drivers
Honda Dealer Team Sweden	Honda Accord Euro R	1	(Sweden) Tomas Engström
BMW Team Italy-Spain	BMW 320i	2	(Italy) Alessandro Zanardi
(Germany) BMW Team Engstler	BMW 320i	3	(Germany) Franz Engstler
(Denmark) SEAT Racing Team	SEAT Toledo Cupra	4	(Denmark) Michel Nykjær
(Italy) DB Motorsport	Alfa Romeo 156	5	(Italy) Salvatore Tavano
(Italy) DB Motorsport	Alfa Romeo 156	6	(Italy) Andrea Larini
Avtodom Racing - BMW Russia	BMW 320i	7	(Russia) Mikhail Ukhov
(San Marino) Zerocinque Motorsport	BMW 320i	8	(San Marino) Stefano Valli
Peugeot Sport Denmark	Peugeot 407	9	(Sweden) Jens Edman
(Sweden) IPS Motorsport	Peugeot 407	10	(Sweden) Johan Stureson
(Finland) Maarakennus M. Laivola Oy	SEAT Toledo Cupra	11	(Finland) Ari Laivola
(Germany) Schubert Motors	BMW 320i	12	(Russia) Rustem Teregulov
(Germany) Schubert Motors	BMW 320i	13	(Germany) Claudia Hürtgen
(Italy) SEAT Sport Italia	SEAT Toledo Cupra	14	(Italy) Alessandro Balzan
(Sweden) WestCoast Racing	BMW 320i	15	(Sweden) Richard Göransson
(Sweden) WestCoast Racing	BMW 320i	16	(Sweden) Thed Björk
(Austria) TW Racing	Ford Focus ST170	19	(Austria) Wolfgang Treml
(United Kingdom) SEAT Sport UK	SEAT Toledo Cupra	20	(United Kingdom) Jason Plato
(Hong Kong) GR Asia	SEAT Toledo Cupra	21	(Netherlands) Tom Coronel
(Hong Kong) GR Asia	SEAT Toledo Cupra	22	(United Kingdom) Rob Collard
(Italy) Proteam Motorsport	BMW 320i	23	(Italy) Davide Roda
(Italy) Proteam Motorsport	BMW 320i	24	(Italy) Luca Rangoni
Super Production class
(San Marino) ZeroCinque Motorsport	BMW 320i	51	(Italy) Lorenzo Pasquinelli
(Russia) Sport-Garage	Volkswagen Golf IV GTi	52	(Russia) Sergey Krylov
(Russia) Sport-Garage	Volkswagen Golf III GTi	53	(Russia) Andrey Nikolaev
(Italy) Errepi Racing	Alfa Romeo 147 SP	54	(Italy) Lorenzo Falessi

== Final standings ==
Pos	Driver	Race 1	Race 2	Pts
Super 2000
1	(Sweden) Richard Göransson	2	2	16
2	(United Kingdom) Jason Plato	5	1	14
3	(Italy) Alessandro Zanardi	**1**	7	12
4	(Italy) Salvatore Tavano	3	4	11
5	(Netherlands) Tom Coronel	4	5	9
6	(Sweden) Thed Björk	7	3	8
7	(Germany) Franz Engstler	6	6	6
8	(Sweden) Jens Edman	8	16	1
9	(Italy) Alessandro Balzan	9	8	1
10	(Germany) Claudia Hürtgen	Ret	9	0
11	(United Kingdom) Rob Collard	10	15	0
12	(Italy) Luca Rangoni	Ret	10	0
13	(Italy) Andrea Larini	11	11	0
14	(San Marino) Stefano Valli	12	12	0
15	(Russia) Rustem Teregulov	13	13	0
16	(Finland) Ari Laivola	14	14	0
17	(Denmark) Michel Nykjær	19	Ret	0
18	(Russia) Mikhail Ukhov	Ret	Ret	0
19	(Italy) Davide Roda	Ret	Ret	0
20	(Sweden) Tomas Engström	Ret	DNS	0
21	(Sweden) Johan Stureson	Ret	DNS	0
22	(Austria) Wolfgang Treml	Ret	DNS	0
Super Production
1	(Italy) Lorenzo Falessi	15	17	20
2	(Russia) Sergey Krylov	17	18	14
3	(Russia) Andrey Nikolaev	18	19	11
4	(Italy) Lorenzo Pasquinelli	16	Ret	8
Pos	Driver	Race 1	Race 2	Pts

Colour	Result
Gold	Winner
Silver	Second place
Bronze	Third place
Green	Points classification
Blue	Non-points classification
Blue	Non-classified finish (NC)
Purple	Retired, not classified (Ret)
Red	Did not qualify (DNQ)
Red	Did not pre-qualify (DNPQ)
Black	Disqualified (DSQ)
White	Did not start (DNS)
White	Withdrew (WD)
White	Race cancelled (C)
Blank	Did not practice (DNP)
Blank	Did not arrive (DNA)
Blank	Excluded (EX)

**Bold** – Pole
Italics – Fastest Lap
