= 2008 FIA WTCC Race of Brazil =

Race details
- Round 1 of 12 in the 2008 World Touring Car Championship at Autódromo Internacional de Curitiba in Pinhais, Brazil.
- Date: 2 March, 2008
- Location: Pinhais, Brazil
- Course: Autódromo Internacional de Curitiba; 3.695 kilometres (2.296 mi)

Race One
- Laps: 16
Pole position
Driver		(France) Yvan Muller	SEAT Sport
Time		1:24.295	
Podium
First		(France) Yvan Muller	SEAT Sport
Second		(Sweden) Rickard Rydell	SEAT Sport
Third		(Germany) Jörg Müller	BMW Team Germany
Fastest Lap
Driver		(United Kingdom) Andy Priaulx	BMW Team UK
Time		1:25.100	

Race Two
- Laps: 14
Podium
First		(Italy) Gabriele Tarquini	SEAT Sport
Second		(United Kingdom) Andy Priaulx	BMW Team UK
Third		(Spain) Félix Porteiro	BMW Team Italy-Spain
Fastest Lap
Driver		(Brazil) Augusto Farfus	BMW Team Germany
Time		1:24.959	

The 2008 FIA WTCC Race of Brazil was the opening round of the 2008 World Touring Car Championship season and the third running of the FIA WTCC Race of Brazil. It took place on 2 March at the Autodromo Internacional de Curitiba in Pinhais, Brazil.

Both races were won by SEAT Sport with Yvan Muller winning race one and Gabriele Tarquini winning race two.

== Background ==
Having run their diesel engine in three of their cars towards the end of 2007, SEAT Sport entered five cars powered by their TDI engine for 2008 as they looked to challenge BMW.

== Report ==
=== Testing and free practice ===
Augusto Farfus was quickest in the Friday test session, Sergio Hernández in 14th was the best placed independent driver.

Fellow BMW driver Jörg Müller topped the first free practice session on Saturday morning which took place on a drying track.

SUNRED Engineering's Tom Coronel was quickest in the second practice session, just 0.002 seconds quicker than the BMW of Farfus.

=== Qualifying ===
Yvan Muller led a SEAT front row with Rickard Rydell second. Farfus was third for BMW having had two of his fast laps interrupted, the first when the red flags came out for Chevrolet's Alain Menu who crashed at the final corner and the second time when he had to avoid a spinning Jörg Müller. Tarquini had the engine in his car changed prior to qualifying and ended the session fourth fastest while Nicola Larini was the best of the Chevrolets in fifth. His teammate Robert Huff was caught out by the red flag and started eighth for race one. Jordi Gené was ninth having suffered brake problems and Coronel behind him was the best–placed petrol–powered SEAT. Exagon Engineering's Pierre-Yves Corthals was the independents' pole sitter in 15th.

Menu escaped without injury from accident but was transferred to hospital shortly after for precautionary scans. He was later cleared to race having qualified 11th.

=== Warm-Up ===
Farfus led a BMW 1–2–3 in the Sunday morning warm–up session, pole sitter Yvan Muller was ninth.

=== Race One ===
Yvan Muller held first place at the start ahead of Rydell, Tarquini ran first in the early stages of the race before being passed by Farfus. Farfus was closing in second–placed Rydell but was unable to make a move having had to defend from teammate Jörg Müller on the last lap. Andy Priaulx had started 12th and climbed up the order to finish 5th, passing Tarquini and Gené in the final laps. Yvan Muller and Rydell successfully converted their front row starts into a SEAT 1–2, Coronel finished eighth to take pole position for race two. Corthals was the victor in the independents' trophy.

Gené and Corthals were both later given 30–second penalties after the race for driving infringements, Corthals' penalty handed victory in the independents' trophy to Olivier Tielemans. It was also discovered that the BMW of Farfus did not comply with the technical regulations and he was excluded from the race.

=== Race Two ===
Coronel started on pole position, a bad start saw him drop well down the order. Porteiro assumed the lead which was then taken by Tarquini further around the first lap. On lap nine a charging Priaulx passed Félix Porteiro to take second place on lap nine and by the end of the race was on the tail of Tarquini. Tarquini finished first to take the second win of the weekend for SEAT, Priaulx was second and Porteiro third. Jörg Müller ended up fourth ahead of Yvan Muller after an intense battle between the pair. Coronel ended up outside the points in ninth. Tielemans was the independents' victor again.

== Results ==
=== Qualifying ===
Pos.	No.	Name	Team	Car	C	Time
1	12	(France) Yvan Muller	SEAT Sport	SEAT León TDI		1:24.295
2	10	(Sweden) Rickard Rydell	SEAT Sport	SEAT León TDI		1:24.404
3	3	(Brazil) Augusto Farfus	BMW Team Germany	BMW 320si		1:24.482
4	11	(Italy) Gabriele Tarquini	SEAT Sport	SEAT León TDI		1:24.527
5	6	(Italy) Nicola Larini	Chevrolet RML	Chevrolet Lacetti		1:24.579
6	2	(Germany) Jörg Müller	BMW Team Germany	BMW 320si		1:24.659
7	18	(Portugal) Tiago Monteiro	SEAT Sport	SEAT León TDI		1:24.730
8	7	(United Kingdom) Robert Huff	Chevrolet RML	Chevrolet Lacetti		1:24.738
9	9	(Spain) Jordi Gené	SEAT Sport	SEAT León TDI		1:24.785
10	20	(Netherlands) Tom Coronel	SUNRED Engineering	SEAT León TFSI		1:24.987
11	8	(Switzerland) Alain Menu	Chevrolet RML	Chevrolet Lacetti		1:24.993
12	1	(United Kingdom) Andy Priaulx	BMW Team UK	BMW 320si		1:25.046
13	5	(Spain) Félix Porteiro	BMW Team Italy-Spain	BMW 320si		1:25.166
14	4	(Italy) Alessandro Zanardi	BMW Team Italy-Spain	BMW 320si		1:25.175
15	23	(Belgium) Pierre-Yves Corthals	Exagon Engineering	SEAT León TFSI	Y	1:25.363
16	31	(Spain) Sergio Hernández	Scuderia Proteam Motorsport	BMW 320si	Y	1:25.721
17	26	(Italy) Stefano D'Aste	Scuderia Proteam Motorsport	BMW 320si	Y	1:25.806
18	16	(Netherlands) Olivier Tielemans	Wiechers-Sport	BMW 320si	Y	1:26.003
19	42	(Germany) Franz Engstler	Liqui Moly Team Engstler	BMW 320si	Y	1:26.437
20	43	(Russia) Andrey Romanov	Liqui Moly Team Engstler	BMW 320si	Y	1:27.813
21	13	(Turkey) Ibrahim Okyay	Borusan Otomotiv Motorsport	BMW 320si	Y	1:28.412

=== Race 1 ===
Pos.	No.	Name	Team	Car	C	Laps	Time/Retired	Grid	Points
1	12	(France) Yvan Muller	SEAT Sport	SEAT León TDI		16	23:47.024	1	10
2	10	(Sweden) Rickard Rydell	SEAT Sport	SEAT León TDI		16	+0.763	2	8
3	2	(Germany) Jörg Müller	BMW Team Germany	BMW 320si		16	+1.512	6	6
4	1	(United Kingdom) **Andy Priaulx**	BMW Team UK	BMW 320si		16	+6.747	12	5
5	11	(Italy) Gabriele Tarquini	SEAT Sport	SEAT León TDI		16	+8.247	4	4
6	5	(Spain) Félix Porteiro	BMW Team Italy-Spain	BMW 320si		16	+15.564	13	3
7	20	(Netherlands) Tom Coronel	SUNRED Engineering	SEAT León TFSI		16	+16.334	10	2
8	16	(Netherlands) Olivier Tielemans	Wiechers-Sport	BMW 320si	Y	16	+22.871	18	1
9	26	(Italy) Stefano D'Aste	Scuderia Proteam Motorsport	BMW 320si	Y	16	+25.886	17	
10	42	(Germany) Franz Engstler	Liqui Moly Team Engstler	BMW 320si	Y	16	+30.859	19	
11	9	(Spain) Jordi Gené	SEAT Sport	SEAT León TDI		16	+38.170	9	
12	43	(Russia) Andrey Romanov	Liqui Moly Team Engstler	BMW 320si	Y	16	+46.658	20	
13	23	(Belgium) Pierre-Yves Corthals	Exagon Engineering	SEAT León TFSI	Y	16	+48.035	15	
14	31	(Spain) Sergio Hernández	Scuderia Proteam Motorsport	BMW 320si	Y	15	+1 Lap	16	
15	4	(Italy) Alessandro Zanardi	BMW Team Italy-Spain	BMW 320si		15	+1 Lap	14	
16	13	(Turkey) Ibrahim Okyay	Borusan Otomotiv Motorsport	BMW 320si	Y	15	+1 Lap	21	
17	18	(Portugal) Tiago Monteiro	SEAT Sport	SEAT León TDI		13	+3 Laps	7	
Ret	7	(United Kingdom) Robert Huff	Chevrolet RML	Chevrolet Lacetti		7	Race incident	8	
Ret	6	(Italy) Nicola Larini	Chevrolet RML	Chevrolet Lacetti		2	Race incident	3	
Ret	8	(Switzerland) Alain Menu	Chevrolet RML	Chevrolet Lacetti		2	Race incident	11	
DSQ	3	(Brazil) Augusto Farfus	BMW Team Germany	BMW 320si		16	Disqualified	3	

- **Bold** denotes Fastest lap.

=== Race 2 ===
Pos.	No.	Name	Team	Car	C	Laps	Time/Retired	Grid	Points
1	11	(Italy) Gabriele Tarquini	SEAT Sport	SEAT León TDI		14	20:06.577	4	10
2	1	(United Kingdom) Andy Priaulx	BMW Team UK	BMW 320si		14	+0.327	5	8
3	5	(Spain) Félix Porteiro	BMW Team Italy-Spain	BMW 320si		14	+1.202	3	6
4	2	(Germany) Jörg Müller	BMW Team Germany	BMW 320si		14	+1.745	6	5
5	12	(France) Yvan Muller	SEAT Sport	SEAT León TDI		14	+5.045	8	4
6	3	(Brazil) **Augusto Farfus**	BMW Team Germany	BMW 320si		14	+5.360	21	3
7	10	(Sweden) Rickard Rydell	SEAT Sport	Seat Leon TDI		14	+6.306	7	2
8	9	(Spain) Jordi Gené	SEAT Sport	SEAT León TDI		14	+7.637	11	1
9	20	(Netherlands) Tom Coronel	SUNRED Engineering	SEAT León TFSI		14	+13.536	2	
10	8	(Switzerland) Alain Menu	Chevrolet RML	Chevrolet Lacetti		14	+17.262	10	
11	4	(Italy) Alessandro Zanardi	BMW Team Italy-Spain	BMW 320si		14	+17.693	15	
12	6	(Italy) Nicola Larini	Chevrolet RML	BMW 320si		14	+17.901	19	
13	18	(Portugal) Tiago Monteiro	SEAT Sport	SEAT León TDI		14	+18.597	17	
14	16	(Netherlands) Olivier Tielemans	Wiechers-Sport	BMW 320si	Y	14	+18.822	1	
15	31	(Spain) Sergio Hernández	Scuderia Proteam Motorsport	BMW 320si	Y	14	+19.242	14	
16	26	(Italy) Stefano D'Aste	Scuderia Proteam Motorsport	BMW 320si	Y	14	+20.272	9	
17	42	(Germany) Franz Engstler	Liqui Moly Team Engstler	BMW 320si	Y	14	+21.476	10	
18	23	(Belgium) Pierre-Yves Corthals	Exagon Engineering	SEAT León TFSI	Y	14	+24.299	13	
19	23	(Russia) Andrey Romanov	Liqui Moly Team Engstler	BMW 320si	Y	14	+41.445	12	
20	13	(Turkey) Ibrahim Okyay	Borusan Otomotiv Motorsport	BMW 320si	Y	13	+1 Lap	16	
Ret	7	(United Kingdom) Robert Huff	Chevrolet RML	Chevrolet Lacetti		1	Race incident	18	

- **Bold** denotes Fastest lap.

== Standings after the event ==
Drivers' Championship standings

Pos	Driver	Points
1	(France) Yvan Muller	14
2	(Italy) Gabriele Tarquini	14
3	(United Kingdom) Andy Priaulx	13
4	(Germany) Jörg Müller	11
5	(Sweden) Rickard Rydell	10

Yokohama Independents' Trophy standings

Pos	Driver	Points
1	(Netherlands) Olivier Tielemans	20
2	(Italy) Stefano D'Aste	14
3	(Germany) Franz Engstler	11
4	(Spain) Sergio Hernández	11
5	(Russia) Andrey Romanov	8

Manufacturers' Championship standings

Pos	Manufacturer	Points
1	(Spain) SEAT	33
2	(Germany) BMW	25
3	(United States) Chevrolet	7

- Note: Only the top five positions are included for both sets of drivers' standings.
