= 2007 World Touring Car Championship =

Motorsport contest

Champions
- World Drivers' Champion: Andy Priaulx
- World Manufacturers' Champion: BMW

Seasons
- ← 2006 2008 →

The 2007 World Touring Car Championship season was the 4th season of FIA World Touring Car Championship motor racing. The championship, which commenced on 11 March and ended on 18 November, after twenty-two races, was open to Super 2000 Cars, Diesel 2000 Cars and Super Production Cars as defined by the relevant FIA regulations. The Drivers' Championship was won by Andy Priaulx and the Manufacturers' Championship by BMW.

== Teams and drivers ==
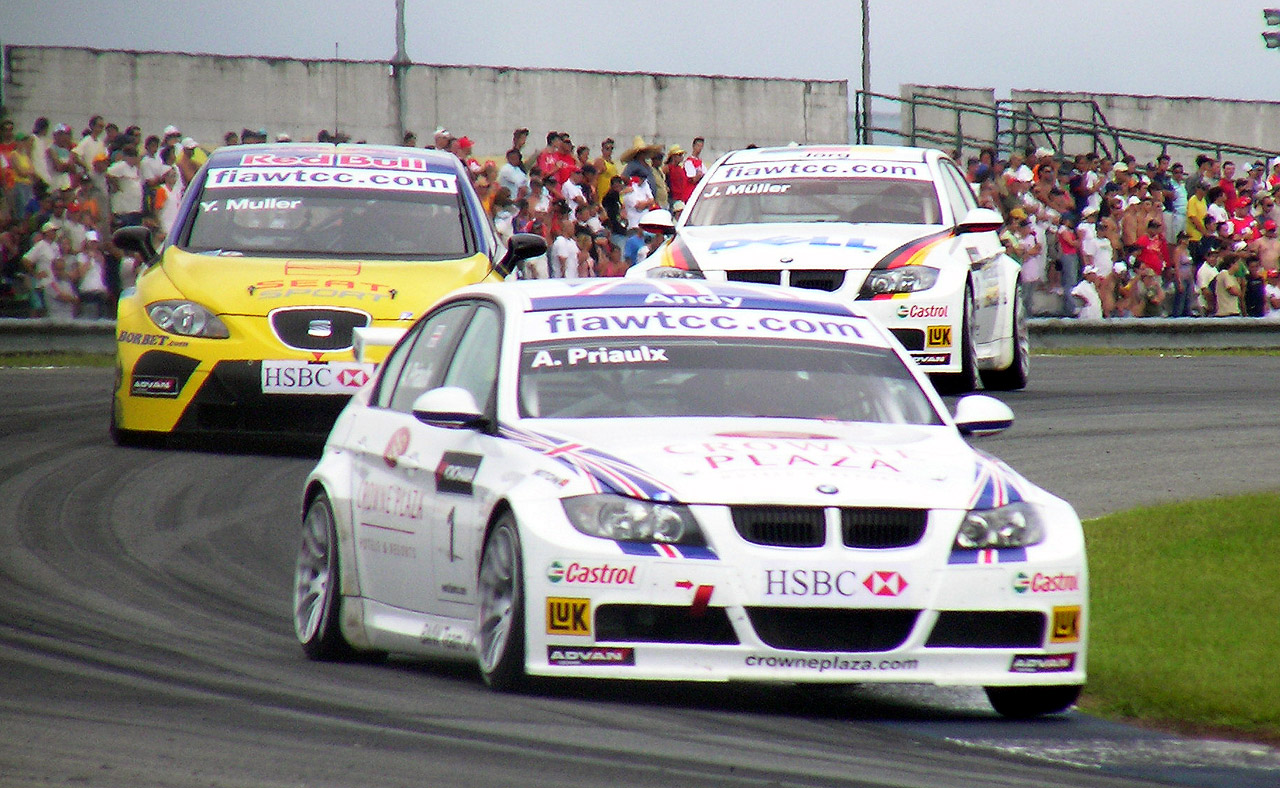
Andy Priaulx (BMW), Yvan Muller (SEAT) and Jörg Müller (BMW) in Curitiba. Yvan Muller challenged double-champion Priaulx in the last stage of the season, but Priaulx won the Drivers' Championship again at the final round in Macau.

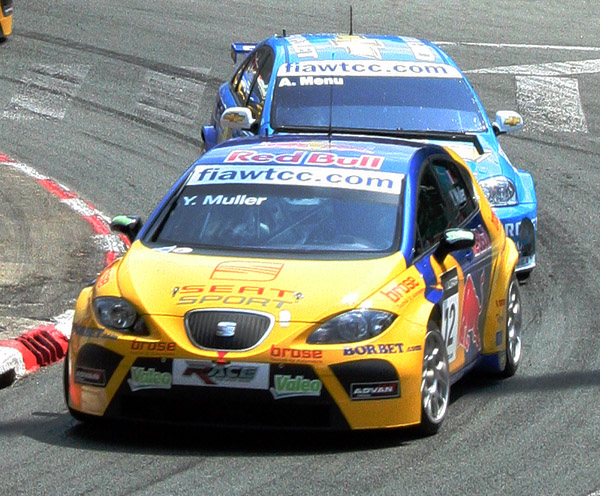
Yvan Muller (SEAT Leon) placed second in the Drivers' Championship

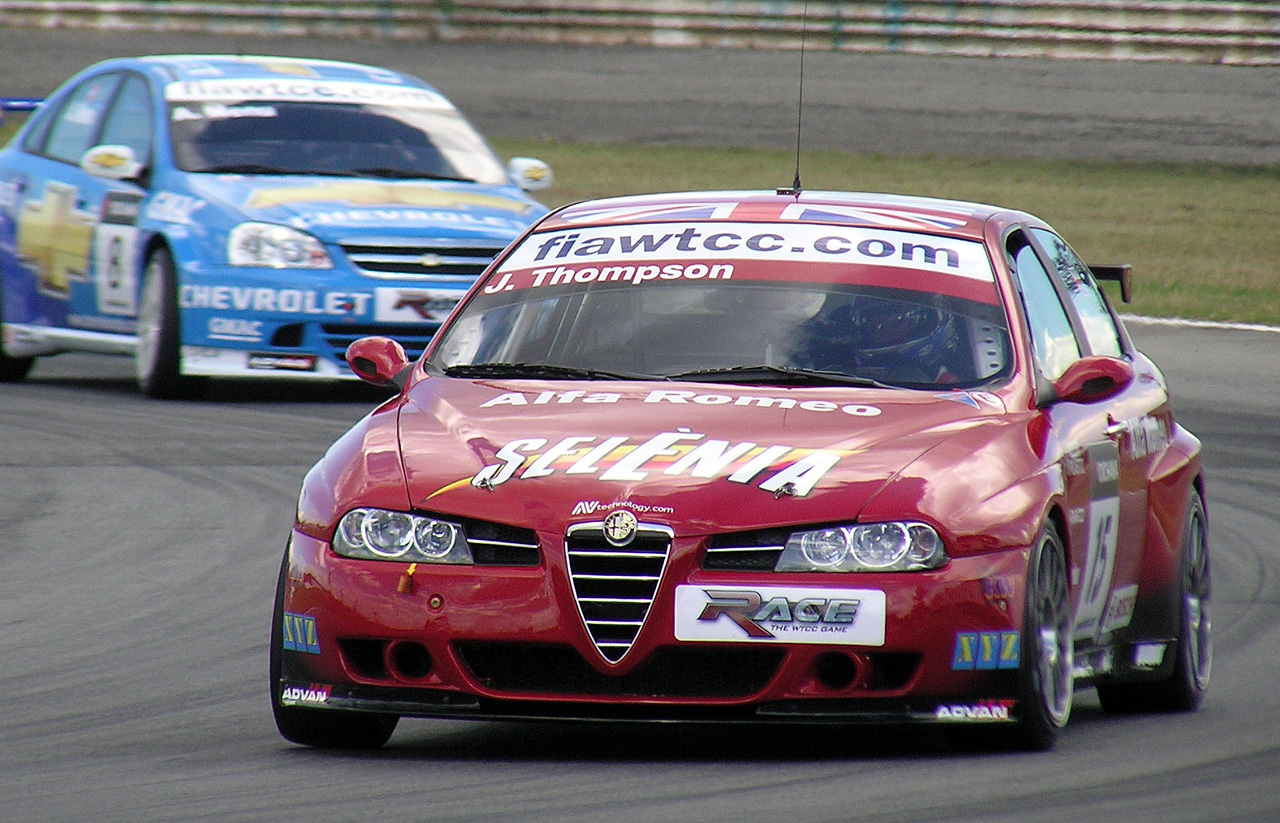
James Thompson (Alfa Romeo 156) placed third in the Drivers' Championship

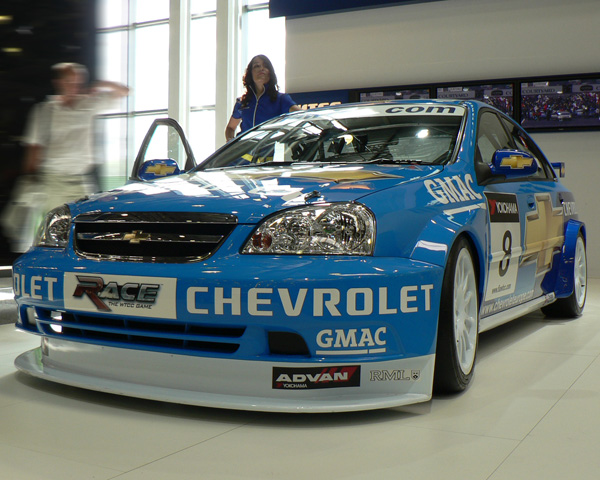
Alain Menu (Chevrolet Lacetti) placed sixth in the Drivers' Championship

The following teams and drivers contested the 2007 FIA World Touring Car Championship.

Team	Car	No.	Drivers	Rounds
Manufacturer Teams
(United Kingdom) BMW Team UK	BMW 320si	1	(United Kingdom) Andy Priaulx	All
(United Kingdom) BMW Team UK	BMW 320si	14	(Sweden) Fredrik Ekblom	7, 10–11
BMW Team Germany	BMW 320si	2	(Germany) Jörg Müller	All
BMW Team Germany	BMW 320si	3	(Brazil) Augusto Farfus	All
BMW Team Italy-Spain	BMW 320si	4	(Italy) Alessandro Zanardi	All
BMW Team Italy-Spain	BMW 320si	5	(Spain) Félix Porteiro	All
(United Kingdom) Chevrolet RML	Chevrolet Lacetti	6	(United Kingdom) Robert Huff	All
(United Kingdom) Chevrolet RML	Chevrolet Lacetti	7	(Italy) Nicola Larini	All
(United Kingdom) Chevrolet RML	Chevrolet Lacetti	8	(Switzerland) Alain Menu	All
(United Kingdom) Chevrolet RML	Chevrolet Lacetti	88	(Sweden) Rickard Rydell	7
(Spain) SEAT Sport	SEAT León	9	(Spain) Jordi Gené	1–6
(Spain) SEAT Sport	SEAT León TDI	9	(Spain) Jordi Gené	7–11
(Spain) SEAT Sport	SEAT León	10	(Mexico) Michel Jourdain Jr.	1–10
(Spain) SEAT Sport	SEAT León	11	(Italy) Gabriele Tarquini	1–9
(Spain) SEAT Sport	SEAT León TDI	11	(Italy) Gabriele Tarquini	10–11
(Spain) SEAT Sport	SEAT León	12	(France) Yvan Muller	1–6
(Spain) SEAT Sport	SEAT León TDI	12	(France) Yvan Muller	7–11
(Spain) SEAT Sport	SEAT León	18	(Portugal) Tiago Monteiro	2–11
(Spain) SEAT Sport	SEAT León	38	(Spain) Oscar Nogués	10
(Spain) SEAT Sport	SEAT León	40	(Germany) Peter Terting	8
(Spain) SEAT Sport	SEAT León	88	(Sweden) Rickard Rydell	11
(Italy) N.technology	Alfa Romeo 156	15	(United Kingdom) James Thompson	All
(Italy) N.technology	Alfa Romeo 156	16	(Netherlands) Olivier Tielemans	1–10
(Italy) N.technology	Alfa Romeo 156	66	(Macau) André Couto	11
(Hong Kong) GR Asia	SEAT León	20	(Netherlands) Tom Coronel	All
(United Kingdom) Team RAC/Aviva	BMW 320si	25	(Netherlands) Duncan Huisman	11
Independents' Trophy
Honda Dealer Team Sweden	Honda Accord Euro R	17	(Sweden) Tomas Engström	10
(Italy) SEAT Sport Italia	SEAT León	19	(Italy) Roberto Colciago	1–4, 6–10
(Italy) SEAT Sport Italia	SEAT León	34	(Italy) Massimiliano Pedalà	3, 5, 8–9
(Hong Kong) GR Asia	SEAT León	21	(Republic of Ireland) Emmet O'Brien	1–6
(Hong Kong) GR Asia	SEAT León	22	(Italy) Maurizio Ceresoli	3–11
(Hong Kong) GR Asia	SEAT León	35	(Russia) Timur Sadredinov	8
(Hong Kong) GR Asia	SEAT León	45	(Russia) Sergey Krylov	9
(France) Exagon Engineering	SEAT León	23	(Belgium) Pierre-Yves Corthals	All
(France) Exagon Engineering	SEAT León	24	(France) Anthony Beltoise	4
(France) Exagon Engineering	SEAT León	77	(Portugal) Luís Pedro Magalhães	6
(Germany) Wiechers-Sport	BMW 320si	26	(Italy) Stefano D'Aste	All
(Sweden) Elgh Motorsport	BMW 320si	28	(Sweden) Carl Rosenblad	7, 11
(Italy) Scuderia Proteam Motorsport	BMW 320si	30	(Italy) Luca Rangoni	All
(Italy) Scuderia Proteam Motorsport	BMW 320si	31	(Spain) Sergio Hernández	1, 3–4, 6–11
(Italy) Scuderia Proteam Motorsport	BMW 320si	32	(Italy) Davide Roda	5
Racing for Belgium	Alfa Romeo 156	33	(Portugal) Miguel Freitas	2–6, 8, 10–11
(Switzerland) Maurer Motorsport	Chevrolet Lacetti	36	(Spain) María de Villota	3
(Germany) Engstler Motorsport	BMW 320i	43	(Germany) Franz Engstler	11
(Germany) Engstler Motorsport	BMW 320i	44	(Russia) Andrey Romanov	11
(Russia) Russian Bears Motorsport	BMW 320i	50	(Russia) Lev Fridman	2–3
(Russia) Russian Bears Motorsport	BMW 320i	51	(Russia) Evgeny Zelenov	2
(Russia) Russian Bears Motorsport	BMW 320i	52	(Russia) Viktor Shapovalov	2–3
(Russia) Golden Motors	Honda Accord Euro R	54	(Russia) Alexander Lvov	7
(Russia) Golden Motors	Honda Accord Euro R	55	(Russia) Andrey Smetsky	7
(Macau) Ao's Racing Team	BMW 320i	62	(Macau) Ao Chi Hong	11
(Russia) Avtodom Racing	BMW 320i	63	(Hong Kong) Henry Lee Jr.	11
Guest Entries
(United Kingdom) Team RAC/Aviva	BMW 320si	27	(United Kingdom) Colin Turkington	9, 11
(Germany) TFS-Yaco Racing	Toyota Corolla T-Sport	37	(Germany) Philip Geipel	5
(Germany) Engstler Motorsport	BMW 320i	46	(Hong Kong) David Louie	11
(Sweden) Polestar Racing	Volvo S60 Flexifuel	60	(Sweden) Robert Dahlgren	7

=== Driver changes ===
Changed Teams

- Augusto Farfus: N-Technology → BMW Team Germany
- James Thompson: SEAT Sport → N-Technology
- Emmet O'Brien: Wiechers-Sport → GR Asia
- Pierre-Yves Corthals: Jas Motorsport → Exagon Engineering
- Stefano D'Aste: Proteam Motorsport → Wiechers-Sport

Entering WTCC including those who entered one-off rounds in 2006

- Félix Porteiro: GP2 Series → BMW Team Italy-Spain
- Michel Jourdain Jr.: NASCAR Craftman Truck Series → SEAT Sport
- Tiago Monteiro: Formula 1 → SEAT Sport
- Olivier Tielemans: DTM → N-Technology
- Roberto Colciago: Italian Superturismo Championship → SEAT Sport Italia
- Sergio Hernández: GP2 Series → Scuderia Proteam Motorsport
- Miguel Freitas: Eurocup Mégane Trophy → Racing for Belgium

Leaving WTCC

- Peter Terting: SEAT Sport → International GT Open
- Duncan Huisman: BMW Team Italy-Spain → No full-time drive
- Gianni Morbidelli: N-Technology → Superstars Series
- Salvatore Tavano: N-Technology → Le Mans Series
- Ryan Sharp: Jas Motorsport → FIA GT Championship
- Diego Romanini: Wiechers-Sport → Eurocup Mégane Trophy
- Dirk Müller: BMW Team Germany → FIA GT Championship

== Calendar ==
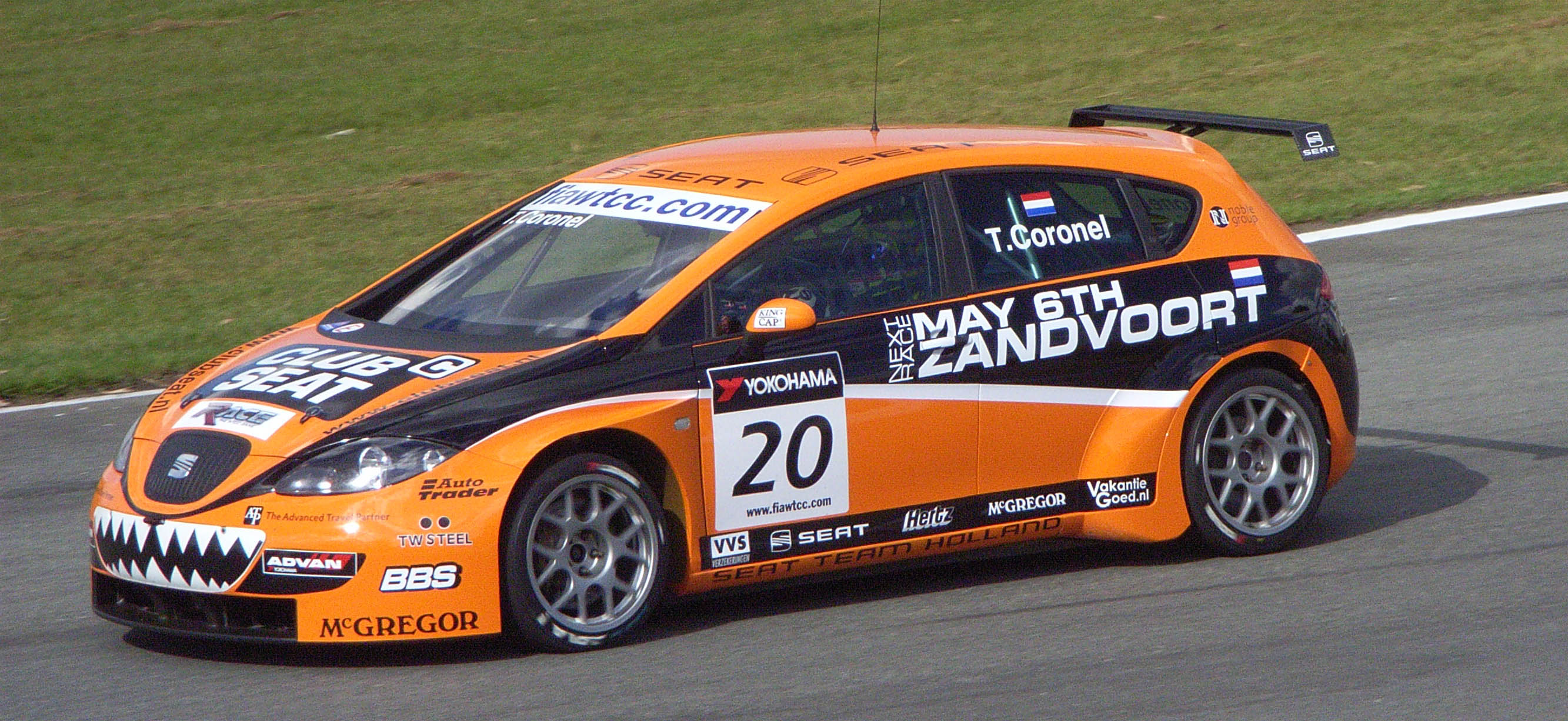
Four circuits (Zandvoort, Pau, Porto and Anderstorp) newly joined the category. Image: an advertisement for the race at Zandvoort, one of them, by the car of Tom Coronel at the opening races in Curitiba.

A provisional calendar was released on 15 January 2007.. On 27 February 2007, the FIA announced that the 13th and 14th races of the series originally scheduled to be run in Istanbul would instead take place at the Anderstorp circuit.

Each race weekend featured two races of 50 kilometres each (similar to Superbike World Championship race format). If the safety car was deployed during a race, the first two laps under it were not counted towards the race distance.

The starting grid order for the first race of each weekend was determined by the results of qualifying and the race began with a rolling start. The second race grid order was determined by the results of the first race with the top eight positions reversed. The second race began with a standing start.

Round		Race Name	Track	Date
1	R1	HSBC Race of Brazil	(Brazil) Autódromo Internacional de Curitiba	11 March
1	R2	HSBC Race of Brazil	(Brazil) Autódromo Internacional de Curitiba	11 March
2	R3	Courtyard Race of the Netherlands	(Netherlands) Circuit Park Zandvoort	6 May
2	R4	Courtyard Race of the Netherlands	(Netherlands) Circuit Park Zandvoort	6 May
3	R5	Stihl Race of Spain	(Spain) Circuit Ricardo Tormo	20 May
3	R6	Stihl Race of Spain	(Spain) Circuit Ricardo Tormo	20 May
4	R7	Beru Race of France	(France) Circuit de Pau Ville	3 June
4	R8	Beru Race of France	(France) Circuit de Pau Ville	3 June
5	R9	Race of the Czech Republic	(Czech Republic) Masaryk Circuit	17 June
5	R10	Race of the Czech Republic	(Czech Republic) Masaryk Circuit	17 June
6	R11	Race of Portugal	(Portugal) Circuito da Boavista	8 July
6	R12	Race of Portugal	(Portugal) Circuito da Boavista	8 July
7	R13	Race of Sweden	(Sweden) Scandinavian Raceway	29 July
7	R14	Race of Sweden	(Sweden) Scandinavian Raceway	29 July
8	R15	Beru Race of Germany	(Germany) Motorsport Arena Oschersleben	26 August
8	R16	Beru Race of Germany	(Germany) Motorsport Arena Oschersleben	26 August
9	R17	Courtyard Race of UK	(United Kingdom) Brands Hatch	23 September
9	R18	Courtyard Race of UK	(United Kingdom) Brands Hatch	23 September
10	R19	Courtyard Race of Italy	(Italy) Autodromo Nazionale di Monza	5 October
10	R20	Courtyard Race of Italy	(Italy) Autodromo Nazionale di Monza	5 October
11	R21	Monroe Race of Macau	(Macau) Guia Circuit	16 November
11	R22	Monroe Race of Macau	(Macau) Guia Circuit	16 November

== Results and standings ==
=== Races ===
Race	Race Name	Pole Position	Fastest lap	Winning driver	Winning team	Winning independent	Report
1	Race of Brazil	(Germany) Jörg Müller	(Germany) Jörg Müller	(Germany) Jörg Müller	BMW Team Germany	(Belgium) Pierre-Yves Corthals	Report
2	Race of Brazil		(Germany) Jörg Müller	(Brazil) Augusto Farfus	BMW Team Germany	(Italy) Luca Rangoni	Report
3	Race of the Netherlands	(Switzerland) Alain Menu	(Italy) Luca Rangoni	(Switzerland) Alain Menu	(United States) Chevrolet	(Italy) Luca Rangoni	Report
4	Race of the Netherlands		(Italy) Gabriele Tarquini	(Italy) Gabriele Tarquini	(Spain) SEAT Sport	(Italy) Luca Rangoni	Report
5	Race of Spain	(United Kingdom) James Thompson	(United Kingdom) James Thompson	(United Kingdom) James Thompson	(Italy) N.Technology	(Italy) Luca Rangoni	Report
6	Race of Spain		(United Kingdom) Robert Huff	(United Kingdom) James Thompson	(Italy) N.Technology	(Italy) Luca Rangoni	Report
7	Race of France	(Switzerland) Alain Menu	(Switzerland) Alain Menu	(Switzerland) Alain Menu	(United States) Chevrolet	(Italy) Stefano D'Aste	Report
8	Race of France		(Brazil) Augusto Farfus	(Brazil) Augusto Farfus	BMW Team Germany	(Belgium) Pierre-Yves Corthals	Report
9	Race of the Czech Republic	(Spain) Félix Porteiro	(Brazil) Augusto Farfus	(Spain) Félix Porteiro	BMW Team Italy-Spain	(Italy) Massimiliano Pedalà	Report
10	Race of the Czech Republic		(Italy) Alessandro Zanardi	(Germany) Jörg Müller	BMW Team Germany	(Italy) Stefano D'Aste	Report
11	Race of Portugal	(Switzerland) Alain Menu	(United Kingdom) Robert Huff	(Switzerland) Alain Menu	(United States) Chevrolet	(Italy) Stefano D'Aste	Report
12	Race of Portugal		(Germany) Jörg Müller	(United Kingdom) Andy Priaulx	(United Kingdom) BMW Team UK	(Belgium) Pierre-Yves Corthals	Report
13	Race of Sweden	(Portugal) Tiago Monteiro	(Switzerland) Alain Menu	(United Kingdom) Robert Huff	(United States) Chevrolet	(Italy) Luca Rangoni	Report
14	Race of Sweden		(Italy) Alessandro Zanardi	(Sweden) Rickard Rydell	(United States) Chevrolet	(Italy) Roberto Colciago	Report
15	Race of Germany	(Italy) Gabriele Tarquini	(Italy) Roberto Colciago	(France) Yvan Muller	(Spain) SEAT Sport	(Italy) Roberto Colciago	Report
16	Race of Germany		(United Kingdom) James Thompson	(Brazil) Augusto Farfus	BMW Team Germany	(Italy) Massimiliano Pedalà	Report
17	(United Kingdom) Race of UK	(Switzerland) Alain Menu	(France) Yvan Muller	(Switzerland) Alain Menu	(United States) Chevrolet	(Belgium) Pierre-Yves Corthals	Report
18	(United Kingdom) Race of UK		(United Kingdom) Colin Turkington	(United Kingdom) Andy Priaulx	(United Kingdom) BMW Team UK	(Belgium) Pierre-Yves Corthals	Report
19	Race of Italy	(France) Yvan Muller	(Spain) Jordi Gené	(France) Yvan Muller	(Spain) SEAT Sport	(Italy) Luca Rangoni	Report
20	Race of Italy		(United Kingdom) James Thompson	(Spain) Jordi Gené	(Spain) SEAT Sport	(Italy) Roberto Colciago	Report
21	Guia Race of Macau	(Switzerland) Alain Menu	(Italy) Gabriele Tarquini	(Switzerland) Alain Menu	(United States) Chevrolet	(Italy) Luca Rangoni	Report
22	Guia Race of Macau		(Italy) Gabriele Tarquini	(United Kingdom) Andy Priaulx	(United Kingdom) BMW Team UK	(Italy) Luca Rangoni	Report

== Championship standings ==
Points system
**1st**	**2nd**	**3rd**	**4th**	**5th**	**6th**	**7th**	**8th**
10	8	6	5	4	3	2	1

=== Drivers' Championship ===
Pos	Driver	BRA (Brazil)		NED (Netherlands)		ESP (Spain)		FRA (France)		CZE (Czech Republic)		POR (Portugal)		SWE (Sweden)		GER (Germany)		UK (United Kingdom)		ITA (Italy)		MAC (Macau)		Pts
1	(United Kingdom) Andy Priaulx	2	2	8	**5**	5	3	6	2	Ret	7	7	1	11	13	5	2	7*	1	NC	Ret	8	**1**	**92**
2	(France) Yvan Muller	8	**4**	NC	12	3	4	2	6	6	DNS	5	5	6	Ret	1	5	4*	5*	**1**	5	27†	DNS	**81**
3	(United Kingdom) James Thompson	Ret	11	13	19	**1**	1	10	7	9	5	10	10	3	5	3	4	2	8*	3	3	5	3	**79**
4	(Brazil) Augusto Farfus Jr.	3	1	5	2	22†	10	7	1	4	2	9	6	16	9*	7	1	11	Ret	7	Ret	26†	DNS	**71**
5	(Italy) Nicola Larini	Ret	10	2	4	2	5	Ret	11	5	6	3	20†	7	2	Ret	21	Ret	12	4	2	7	2	**71**
6	(Switzerland) Alain Menu	Ret	Ret	**1**	Ret	9	14	**1**	8	8	**Ret**	**1**	3	8	**3**	NC	10	**1**	Ret	5	Ret	**1**	21†	**69**
7	(Germany) Jörg Müller	**1**	3	10	3	8	**2**	11	10	2	1	8	**2**	15	10	4	Ret	14	7*	16	14	13	20†	**66**
8	(Italy) Gabriele Tarquini	4	5	7	1	Ret	24†	19	12	7	4	4	7	5	7	**2**	7	10	Ret	6	Ret	2	14	**62**
9	(United Kingdom) Robert Huff	5	Ret	Ret	13	Ret	13	4	4	20	NC	2	11	1	11	11	6	6*	3	8	**4**	3	Ret	**57**
10	(Spain) Jordi Gené	9	12	9	10	4	6	8	**5**	15	8	14	21†	18	24	6	3	5*	6*	2	1	4	22†	**55**
11	(Portugal) Tiago Monteiro			4	9	Ret	12	3	3	13	9	15	13	**2**	6	10	8	21	11	Ret	8	6	4	**38**
12	(Spain) Félix Porteiro	Ret	Ret	11	8	Ret	19	5	Ret	**1**	3	17	18	14	16	Ret	20	9*	**2**	18	Ret	12	7	**32**
13	(Netherlands) Tom Coronel	6	8	Ret	14	21	25†	9	Ret	Ret	11	6	4	4	4	Ret	12	13	9*	9	7	15	5	**29**
14	(Italy) Luca Rangoni	Ret	7	3	6	7	7	Ret	17	18	Ret	20	12	17	20	16	18	16	21†	10	DNS	17	10	**15**
15	(Italy) Alessandro Zanardi	7	6	12	11	Ret	DNS	Ret	9	3	20	16	15	20	15	Ret	15	15	Ret	13	6	10	Ret	**14**
16	(Sweden) Rickard Rydell													9	1							11	6	**13**
17	(Italy) Roberto Colciago	WD	WD	6	7	Ret	Ret	DNS	DNS			Ret	DNS	19	18	8	**14**	12	15	22†	9			**6**
18	(Mexico) Michel Jourdain Jr.	12	15	15	16	6	9	12	Ret	11	13	12	9	Ret	12	12	9	19	13	14	13			**3**
19	(Belgium) Pierre-Yves Corthals	10	9	14	15	13	16	18	13	12	15	13	8	22	23	Ret	DNS	8*	10	DSQ	DSQ	Ret	13	**3**
20	(Spain) Sergio Hernández	14	Ret			10	8	14	Ret			Ret	DNS	Ret	22	14	17	18	16	19	17	21	15	**1**
=	(Sweden) Fredrik Ekblom													12	14					11	12	16	9*	**1**
NC	(Netherlands) Olivier Tielemans	Ret	14	16	17	14	11	Ret	16	19	16	Ret	DNS	13	21	9	Ret	20	14	Ret	11			**0**
NC	(Netherlands) Duncan Huisman																					9	11	**0**
NC	(Italy) Stefano D'Aste	11	13	17	18	12	18	13	Ret	14	10	11	14	21	19	17	13	17	17	21	10	18	12	**0**
NC	(Italy) Massimiliano Pedalà					11	15			10	12					Ret	11	NC	18					**0**
NC	(Spain) Oscar Nogués																			12	DNS			**0**
NC	(Republic of Ireland) Emmet O'Brien	13	Ret	18	20	17	17	17	Ret	16	17	Ret	19											**0**
NC	(Russia) Timur Sadredinov															13	19							**0**
NC	(Italy) Maurizio Ceresoli					15	23	Ret	15	17	14	18	16	23	25	15	16	Ret	19	17	Ret	22	18	**0**
NC	(France) Anthony Beltoise							15	14															**0**
NC	(Portugal) Miguel Freitas			Ret	21	16	Ret	16	Ret	21	18	19	Ret			DNS	DNS			20	15	23	19	**0**
NC	(Sweden) Tomas Engström																			15	16			**0**
NC	(Germany) Franz Engstler																					19	16	**0**
NC	(Sweden) Carl Rosenblad													25	17							20	17	**0**
NC	(Portugal) Luís Pedro Magalhães											21	17											**0**
NC	(Spain) María de Villota					18	20																	**0**
NC	(Russia) Viktor Shapovalov			19	23	20	21																	**0**
NC	(Russia) Lev Fridman			20	22	19	22																	**0**
NC	(Russia) Sergey Krylov																	Ret	20					**0**
NC	(Italy) Davide Roda									23	21†													**0**
NC	(Russia) Evgeny Zelenov			21	24																			**0**
NC	(Germany) Peter Terting															Ret	22†							**0**
NC	(Russia) Alexander Lvov													24	26									**0**
NC	(Russia) Andrey Romanov																					24	Ret	**0**
NC	(Russia) Andrey Smetsky													26	27									**0**
NC	(Hong Kong) Henry Lee Jr.																					Ret	DNS	**0**
NC	(Macau) André Couto																					DNS	DNS	–
NC	(Macau) Ao Chi Hong																					WD	WD	–
guest drivers ineligible for points
NC	(United Kingdom) Colin Turkington																	3*	4*			14	8*	*
NC	(Sweden) Robert Dahlgren													10	8*									*
NC	(Germany) Phillip Geipel									22	19													*
NC	(Hong Kong) David Louie																					25	Ret	*
Pos	Car	BRA (Brazil)		NED (Netherlands)		ESP (Spain)		FRA (France)		CZE (Czech Republic)		POR (Portugal)		SWE (Sweden)		GER (Germany)		UK (United Kingdom)		ITA (Italy)		MAC (Macau)		Pts

Colour	Result
Gold	Winner
Silver	Second place
Bronze	Third place
Green	Points classification
Blue	Non-points classification
Blue	Non-classified finish (NC)
Purple	Retired, not classified (Ret)
Red	Did not qualify (DNQ)
Red	Did not pre-qualify (DNPQ)
Black	Disqualified (DSQ)
White	Did not start (DNS)
White	Withdrew (WD)
White	Race cancelled (C)
Blank	Did not practice (DNP)
Blank	Did not arrive (DNA)
Blank	Excluded (EX)

**Bold** – Pole
Italics – Fastest Lap

† — Drivers did not finish the race, but were classified as they completed over 90% of the race distance.

Point system: 10–8–6–5–4–3–2–1 for top eight finishers in each race.

Drivers with 0 points were not classified in official championship results.

* Phillip Geipel, Robert Dahlgren, Colin Turkington and David Louie were not eligible to score championship points. Thus, 9th-place finishers scored points in the Race 2 of Sweden, Race 1 & 2 of the United Kingdom and Race 2 of Macau.

=== Yokohama Independents' Trophy ===
Championship promoter KSO organised the Yokohama Independents’ Trophies within the 2007 FIA World Touring Car Championship.

Drivers were awarded points towards the Independents' Trophy in the first twenty rounds on a 10–8–6–5–4–3–2–1 basis for the first eight finishers of those entries which were classified as Independents. Points were awarded in the final two rounds on a 20-16-12-10-8-6-4-2 basis.

Pos	Driver	BRA (Brazil)		NED (Netherlands)		ESP (Spain)		FRA (France)		CZE (Czech Republic)		POR (Portugal)		SWE (Sweden)		GER (Germany)		UK (United Kingdom)		ITA (Italy)		MAC (Macau)		Pts
1	(Italy) Stefano D'Aste	11	13	17	18	12	18	13	**Ret**	14	10	**11**	**14**	21	19	17	13	17	17	21	10	18	12	**152**
2	(Italy) Luca Rangoni	Ret	7	**3**	6	7	**7**	Ret	17	18	Ret	20	12	**17**	**20**	16	18	16	21†	**10**	**DNS**	**17**	**10**	**150**
3	(Belgium) Pierre-Yves Corthals	**10**	**9**	14	15	13	16	18	13	**12**	15	13	8	22	23	Ret	DNS	**8**	**10**	DSQ	DSQ	Ret	13	**124**
4	(Spain) Sergio Hernández	14	Ret			10	8	14	Ret			Ret	DNS	Ret	22	14	17	18	16	19	17	21	15	**81**
5	(Italy) Roberto Colciago	WD	WD	6	**7**	**Ret**	Ret	DNS	DNS			Ret	DNS	19	18	**8**	**14**	12	15	22†	9			**78**
6	(Italy) Maurizio Ceresoli					15	23	Ret	15	17	14	18	16	23	25	15	16	Ret	19	17	Ret	22	18	**66**
7	(Italy) Massimiliano Pedalà					11	15			10	**12**					Ret	11	NC	18					**44**
8	(Portugal) Miguel Freitas			Ret	21	16	Ret	16	Ret	21	18	19	Ret			DNS	DNS			20	15	23	19	**36**
9	(Republic of Ireland) Emmet O'Brien	13	Ret	18	20	17	17	17	Ret	16	17	Ret	19											**35**
10	(Germany) Franz Engstler																					19	16	**20**
11	(Sweden) Carl Rosenblad													25*	17*							20	17	**16**
12	(France) Anthony Beltoise							**15**	14															**14**
13	(Sweden) Tomas Engström																			15	16			**13**
14	(Russia) Timur Sadredinov															13	19							**10**
15	(Portugal) Luís Pedro Magalhães											21	17											**7**
16	(Russia) Alexander Lvov													24	26									**5**
17	(Russia) Viktor Shapovalov			19	23	20	21																	**5**
18	(Russia) Lev Fridman			20	22	19	22																	**4**
19	(Russia) Andrey Smetsky													26	27									**3**
20	(Italy) Davide Roda									23	21†													**3**
21	(Russia) Andrey Romanov																					24	Ret	**2**
22	(Russia) Sergey Krylov																	Ret	20					**2**
23	(Spain) María de Villota					18	20																	**2**
24	(Russia) Evgeny Zelenov			21	24																			**1**
NC	(Hong Kong) Henry Lee Jr.																					Ret	DNS	**0**
NC	(Macau) Ao Chi Hong																					WD	WD	–
Pos	Driver	BRA (Brazil)		NED (Netherlands)		ESP (Spain)		FRA (France)		CZE (Czech Republic)		POR (Portugal)		SWE (Sweden)		GER (Germany)		UK (United Kingdom)		ITA (Italy)		MAC (Macau)		Pts

- * Guest driver

=== Yokohama Teams' Trophy ===
The Yokohama Teams' Trophy was won by Proteam Motorsport.

=== Manufacturers' Championship ===
Pos	Manufacturer	Car	Wins	Points
1	(Germany) BMW	BMW 320si	9	**255**
2	(Spain) SEAT	SEAT León, SEAT León TDI	4	**249**
3	(United States) Chevrolet	Chevrolet Lacetti	7	**218**
4	(Italy) Alfa Romeo	Alfa Romeo 156	2	**124**

Points were awarded on a 10–8–6–5–4–3–2–1 basis in each race but only to the top two placegetters from each manufacturer. All the other cars of that same manufacturer were considered invisible as far as scoring points was concerned.
