= David Louie =

David Louie may refer to:

- David M. Louie (born 1951), Attorney General of Hawaii in the administration of Hawaii Governor Neil Abercrombie
- David Wong Louie (1954–2018), American writer
- David Louie (racing driver) (born 1962), racecar driver from Hong Kong
