= Ao Chi Hong =

Macanese racing driver

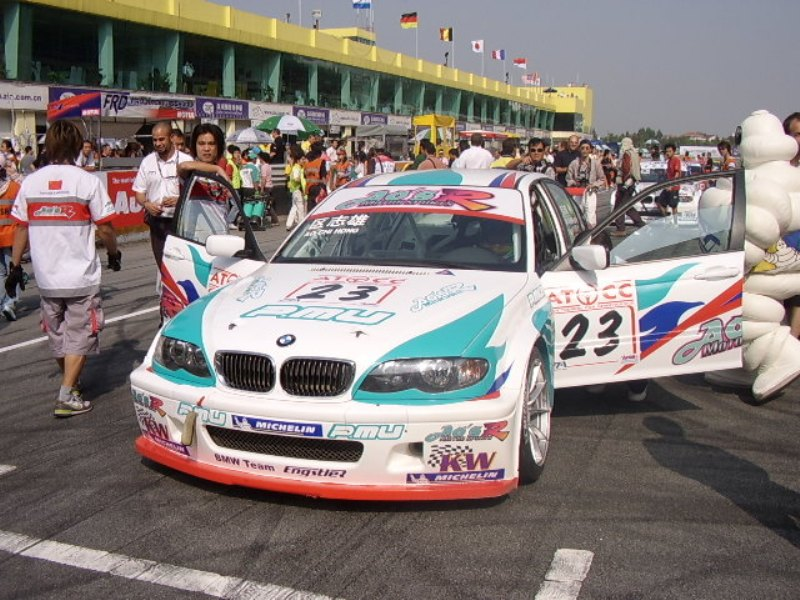
Ao Chi Hong on the grid in his BMW at Zhuhai International Circuit in 2005.

Ao Chi Hong (Chinese: 區志雄, born 30 October 1960) is a Macanese auto racing driver. He has regularly competed in the Asian Touring Car Championship, finishing third overall in 2002, 2003 and 2004. He has competed in two rounds of the 2006 FIA World Touring Car Championship. For the final two rounds in his home nation of Macau, he drove a BMW 320i for his Ao's Racing Team. He managed a nineteenth place in race one, and failed to finish in the second race. He had previously failed to make the grid in the 2005 WTCC, after crashing in qualifying.

== Racing record ==
=== Complete World Touring Car Championship results ===
(key) (Races in bold indicate pole position) (Races in italics indicate fastest lap)

| Year | Team | Car | 1 | 2 | 3 | 4 | 5 | 6 | 7 | 8 | 9 | 10 | 11 | 12 | 13 | 14 | 15 | 16 | 17 | 18 | 19 | 20 | 21 | 22 | DC | Points |
|---|---|---|---|---|---|---|---|---|---|---|---|---|---|---|---|---|---|---|---|---|---|---|---|---|---|---|
| 2005 | Ao's Racing Team | BMW 320i | ITA; 1 | ITA; 2 | FRA; 1 | FRA; 2 | GBR; 1 | GBR; 2 | SMR; 1 | SMR; 2 | MEX; 1 | MEX; 2 | BEL; 1 | BEL; 2 | GER; 1 | GER; 2 | TUR; 1 | TUR; 2 | ESP; 1 | ESP; 2 | MAC; 1 DNS | MAC; 2 DNS | | | NC | 0 |
| 2006 | Ao's Racing Team | BMW 320i | ITA; 1 | ITA; 2 | FRA; 1 | FRA; 2 | GBR; 1 | GBR; 2 | GER; 1 | GER; 2 | BRA; 1 | BRA; 2 | MEX; 1 | MEX; 2 | CZE; 1 | CZE; 2 | TUR; 1 | TUR; 2 | ESP; 1 | ESP; 2 | MAC; 1; 19 | MAC; 2 Ret | | | NC | 0 |
| 2007 | Ao's Racing Team | BMW 320i | BRA; 1 | BRA; 2 | NED; 1 | NED; 2 | ESP; 1 | ESP; 2 | FRA; 1 | FRA; 2 | CZE; 1 | CZE; 2 | POR; 1 | POR; 2 | SWE; 1 | SWE; 2 | GER; 1 | GER; 2 | GBR; 1 | GBR; 2 | ITA; 1 | ITA; 2 | MAC; 1 WD | MAC; 2 WD | NC | 0 |
