= Andrey Romanov (racing driver) =

Russian racing driver

- Nationality: Russian
- Born: 10 July 1979 (age 47) Moscow (Soviet Union)

World Touring Car Championship career
- Debut season: 2007
- Current team: Liqui Moly Team Engstler
- Car number: 16
- Starts: 32
- Wins: 0
- Poles: 0
- Fastest laps: 0

Previous series
- 2007 2006-09 2006: Asian Touring Cars; ADAC Procar Series; Russian Touring Cars

Andrey Romanov (Russian: Андрей Романов, born 10 July 1979 in Moscow) is a Russian auto racing driver and director of MTV/NRG.

== Career ==
Romanov has driven in the Russian Lada Cup and the Russian Honda Civic Cup, as well as the Russian Touring Car Championship. In 2007, he finished as runner-up in the German ADAC Procar Series. He also competed in the FIA World Touring Car Championship in 2007 and 2008. He drove a BMW 320si for the Liqui Moly Team Engstler alongside Franz Engstler. His best race finish was a ninth place in the final round in Macau in 2008.

Romanov raced in ADAC Procar in 2009 for Maurer Motorsport, before returning to the WTCC with Engstler in 2010.

== Racing record ==
=== Complete World Touring Car Championship results ===
(key) (Races in bold indicate pole position) (Races in italics indicate fastest lap)

Year	Team	Car	1	2	3	4	5	6	7	8	9	10	11	12	13	14	15	16	17	18	19	20	21	22	23	24	DC	Points
2007	Engstler Motorsport	BMW 320i	BRA; 1	BRA; 2	NED; 1	NED; 2	ESP; 1	ESP; 2	FRA; 1	FRA; 2	CZE; 1	CZE; 2	POR; 1	POR; 2	SWE; 1	SWE; 2	GER; 1	GER; 2	GBR; 1	GBR; 2	ITA; 1	ITA; 2	MAC; 1; 24	MAC; 2 Ret			NC	0
2008	Liqui Moly Team Engstler	BMW 320si	BRA; 1; 12	BRA; 2; 19	MEX; 1; 20	MEX; 2; 18	ESP; 1; 16	ESP; 2 Ret	FRA; 1; 20	FRA; 2; 20	CZE; 1; 20	CZE; 2; 16	POR; 1; 16	POR; 2; 20	GBR; 1	GBR; 2	GER; 1; 17	GER; 2 ret	EUR; 1; 20	EUR; 2; 20	ITA; 1; 18	ITA; 2 Ret	JPN; 1; 22	JPN; 2; 15	MAC; 1; 20	MAC; 2; 9	NC	0
2010	Liqui Moly Team Engstler	BMW 320si	BRA; 1 Ret	BRA; 2 DNS	MAR; 1 Ret	MAR; 2 DNS	ITA; 1; 13	ITA; 2 Ret	BEL; 1; 19	BEL; 2; 17	POR; 1; 16	POR; 2; 16	GBR; 1	GBR; 2	CZE; 1; 16	CZE; 2; 17	GER; 1; 16	GER; 2; 17	ESP; 1; 16	ESP; 2; 19	JPN; 1 Ret	JPN; 2; 15	MAC; 1; 15	MAC; 2 Ret			NC	0
