= Fabio Fabiani =

Italian auto racing driver

- Nationality: Italian
- Born: 12 October 1974 (age 52) Ravenna (Italy)

World Touring Car Championship career
- Debut season: 2009
- Current team: Engstler Motorsport
- Car number: 21
- Former teams: Proteam Motorsport
- Starts: 24
- Wins: 0
- Poles: 0
- Fastest laps: 0

Championship titles
- 2008 2011: European Touring Car Cup (Super Production); WTCC Jay-Ten Trophy

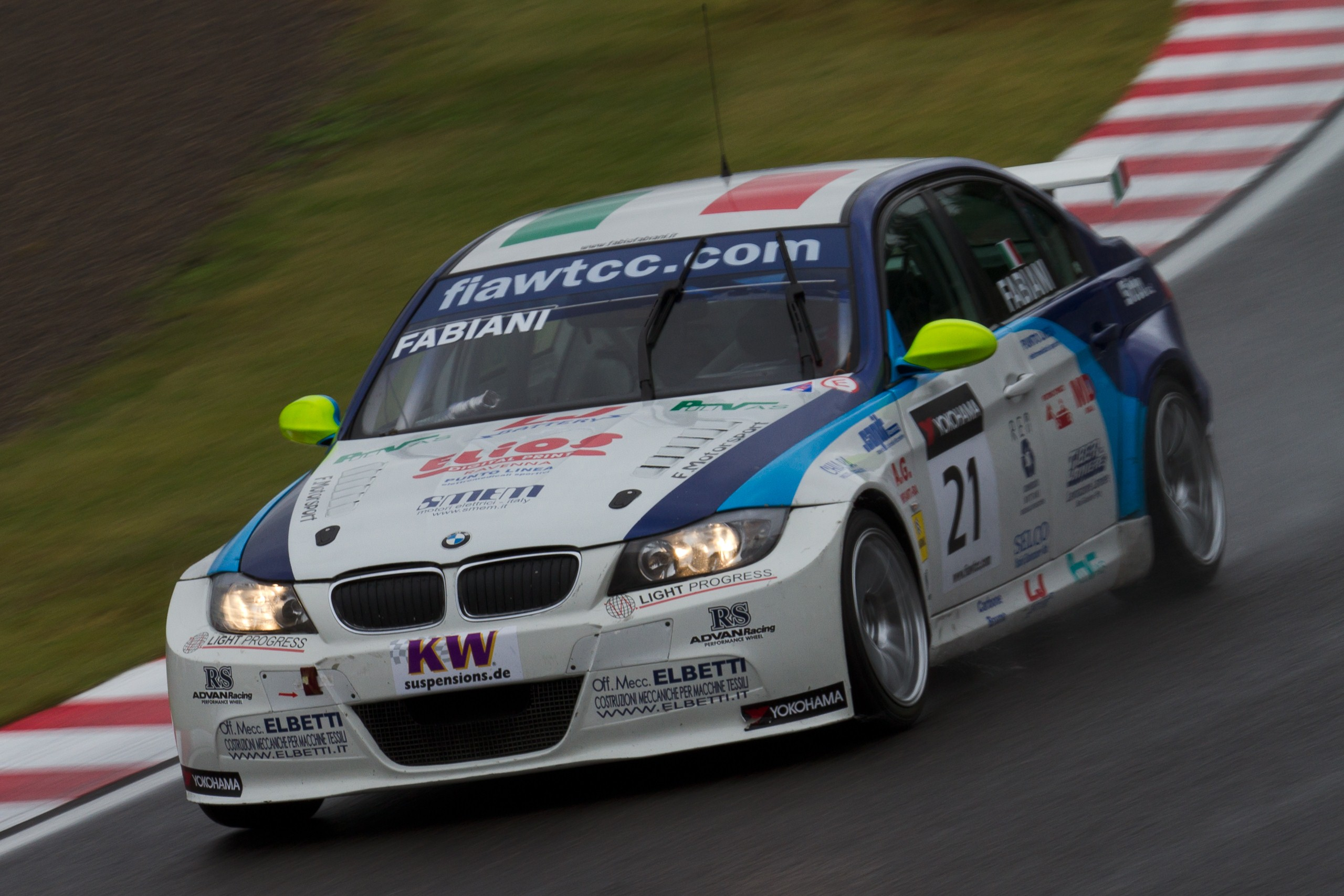
Fabiani driving the Proteam Racing BMW 320si at Suzuka during the 2011 World Touring Car Championship season.

Fabio Fabiani (born 12 October 1974 in Ravenna) is an Italian auto racing driver.

== Moto bike career ==
Fabiani started in the Italian Sport Production Championship in 1994, moving to Italian 125cc in 1995. After Military Service in 1996, he raced in the Italian 600 Sport Production class, Italian 125cc, European 125cc and 250cc. In 2004, he had a serious road car accident and was in a coma for 12 days. After a long convalescence period, he returned to bikes and had a major accident riding. He retired from bikes after that.

== Car racing career ==
Having previously raced in motorcycling at national and international level, Fabiani began racing cars in 2005. He competed in the European Touring Car Cup in 2007 and 2008, winning the Super Production class in 2008 and was second in 2010 and 2011. He made his World Touring Car Championship debut for Proteam Motorsport at the 2009 FIA WTCC Race of Italy and won the WTCC Jay-Ten Trophy in 2011. In 2014, he returned to racing with PAI Tecnosport (Italy), competing in the "Coppa Italia" with Eugenio Pisani in a Seat Leon Supercopa Long Run.

== Racing record ==
=== Complete WTCC results ===
(key) (Races in bold indicate pole position) (Races in italics indicate fastest lap)

| Year | Team | Car | 1 | 2 | 3 | 4 | 5 | 6 | 7 | 8 | 9 | 10 | 11 | 12 | 13 | 14 | 15 | 16 | 17 | 18 | 19 | 20 | 21 | 22 | 23 | 24 | DC | Points |
|---|---|---|---|---|---|---|---|---|---|---|---|---|---|---|---|---|---|---|---|---|---|---|---|---|---|---|---|---|
| 2009 | Scuderia Proteam Motorsport | BMW 320si | BRA; 1 | BRA; 2 | MEX; 1 | MEX; 2 | MAR; 1 | MAR; 2 | FRA; 1 | FRA; 2 | ESP; 1 | ESP; 2 | CZE; 1 | CZE; 2 | POR; 1 | POR; 2 | GBR; 1 | GBR; 2 | GER; 1 | GER; 2 | ITA; 1; 17 | ITA; 2; 22 | JPN; 1 | JPN; 2 | MAC; 1 | MAC; 2 | NC | 0 |
| 2010 | Scuderia Proteam Motorsport | BMW 320si | BRA; 1 | BRA; 2 | MAR; 1 | MAR; 2 | ITA; 1; 15 | ITA; 2; 18 | BEL; 1 | BEL; 2 | POR; 1 | POR; 2 | GBR; 1 | GBR; 2 | CZE; 1; 18 | CZE; 2; 20 | GER; 1 NC | GER; 2; 19 | ESP; 1 | ESP; 2 | JPN; 1 | JPN; 2 | MAC; 1 | MAC; 2 | | | NC | 0 |
| 2011 | Proteam Racing | BMW 320si | BRA; 1; 19 | BRA; 2 NC | BEL; 1; 16 | BEL; 2; 13 | ITA; 1; 18 | ITA; 2; 18 | HUN; 1; 17 | HUN; 2 Ret | CZE; 1 | CZE; 2 | POR; 1 | POR; 2 | GBR; 1 DSQ | GBR; 2 DSQ | GER; 1; 19 | GER; 2; 16 | ESP; 1; 16 | ESP; 2; 17 | JPN; 1 DNQ | JPN; 2 DNQ | | | | | NC | 0 |
| 2011 | Engstler Motorsport | BMW 320si | | | | | | | | | | | | | | | | | | | | | CHN; 1; 18 | CHN; 2; 15 | MAC; 1 | MAC; 2 | NC | 0 |
