= Sergey Krylov (racing driver) =

Russian racing driver

- Nationality: Russian
- Born: Sergey Nikolayevich Krylov; 16 April 1963 (age 63) Moscow, Russia
- Starts: 44
- Championships: 0
- Wins: 0
- Poles: 0
- Fastest laps: 0
- Best finish: 2nd in 2005

Krylov's GR Asia SEAT León at Brands Hatch in the 2007 WTCC

Sergey Nikolayevich Krylov (Russian: Серге́й Никола́евич Крыло́в, IPA: [sʲɪrˈɡʲej nʲɪkɐˈla(j)ɪvʲɪtɕ krɨˈlof]; born 16 April 1963) is a Russian auto racing driver. He competes in the Russian Touring Car Championship. In 2007 he entered the FIA World Touring Car Championship for two rounds at Brands Hatch in a SEAT León for the independent GR Asia Team. He replaced fellow Russian Timur Sadredinov, who could not attend due to passport problems. His best result was a twentieth position in race two. He has also competed in the European Touring Car Cup's Super Production Cup, where he finished as runner-up in 2005 at Vallelunga.

Krylov is working as an advisor for the construction of the Moscow Raceway circuit.

== Complete WTCC results ==
(key) (Races in bold indicate pole position) (Races in italics indicate fastest lap)

Year	Team	Car	1	2	3	4	5	6	7	8	9		10	11	Position	Points
2007	GR Asia	SEAT León	CUR	ZAN	VAL	PAU	BRN	POR	AND	OSC	BRA		MNZ	MAC	NC	0
2007	GR Asia	SEAT León									Ret	20			NC	0
