= 2010 FIA WTCC Race of Germany =

Motorsport race

Race details
- Round 8 of 11 in the 2010 World Touring Car Championship at Motorsport Arena Oschersleben in Oschersleben, Germany.
- Date: 5 September, 2010
- Location: Oschersleben, Germany
- Course: Motorsport Arena Oschersleben; 3.696 kilometres (2.297 mi)

Race One
- Laps: 14
Pole position
Driver		(Brazil) Augusto Farfus	BMW Team RBM
Time		1:38.070	
Podium
First		(Switzerland) Alain Menu	Chevrolet RML
Second		(Brazil) Augusto Farfus	BMW Team RBM
Third		(France) Yvan Muller	Chevrolet RML
Fastest Lap
Driver		(Switzerland) Alain Menu	Chevrolet RML
Time		1:36.543	

Race Two
- Laps: 14
Podium
First		(United Kingdom) Andy Priaulx	BMW Team RBM
Second		(Brazil) Augusto Farfus	BMW Team RBM
Third		(France) Yvan Muller	Chevrolet RML
Fastest Lap
Driver		(Italy) Gabriele Tarquini	1:36.890
Time		SR-Sport	

The 2010 FIA WTCC Race of Germany was the eighth round of the 2010 World Touring Car Championship season and the sixth running of the FIA WTCC Race of Germany. It was held at the Motorsport Arena Oschersleben near Oschersleben, Germany on 5 September 2010. Race one was won by Alain Menu of Chevrolet RML and race two was by Andy Priaulx of BMW Team RBM.

== Background ==
After the Race of the Czech Republic, Yvan Muller was leading the drivers' championship by a reduced margin of five points of Gabriele Tarquini. Sergio Hernández was leading the Yokohama Independents' Trophy.

Harry Vaulkhard was forced to miss the event and the rest of the season having run out of finances. His replacement was Japanese racer Yukinori Taniguchi, who had previously driven for N. Technology in the 2008 World Touring Car Championship season.

== Report ==
=== Free practice ===
Tarquini set the pace in the opening free practice session, leading Chevrolet driver Robert Huff. Jordi Gené was third and Andy Priaulx was the fastest BMW in fourth. The session was red flagged twice, firstly when Stefano D'Aste stuck his Scuderia Proteam Motorsport BMW 320si into a tyre wall. The red flags were out for the second time at the end of the session when Tiago Monteiro went off at the Hasseroder Curve as rain started to fall, bringing first practice to an early close.

Muller led a Chevrolet 1–2 in the second practice session on a drying track. Menu was second and Monteiro was the fastest SEAT driver. Michel Nykjær survived an off to go sixth fastest as the best Rookie Challenge driver.

=== Qualifying ===
Augusto Farfus took his second pole position of the season in qualifying, beating Chevrolet's Huff by a tenth of a second. All of the SR-Sport, RML Chevrolet and BMW Team RBM cars made it through to Q2, as well as the Zengő-Dension Team car of Norbert Michelisz. Monteiro damaged his front right wheel at the end of Q1 and was unable to take part in Q2, he therefore lined up tenth.

With rain starting to fall, the remaining cars went out to set a time straight away. Huff, Tarquini and Gené required a second lap to set a competitive time. By the third lap, the rain was heavier and caught out Huff who spun and collided with team mate Menu. Tarquini lost control and hit a wall while Michelisz cut across the grass. The rain induced incidents brought out the red flags with three minutes remaining. The session was not restarted, so Priaulx put his BMW in third in the manufacturer's home race and Menu was fourth. Michelisz was fifth and Tarquini was sixth while Tom Coronel, Muller and Gené completed the top nine ahead of Monteiro.

=== Warm-Up ===
Chevrolet finished 1–2–3 in the foggy conditions of Sunday morning's warm–up session with Huff leading Menu and Muller. Priaulx stopped out on track while D'Aste damaged the rear of his BMW in a separate incident.

=== Race One ===
Farfus started from pole position but ran wide at turn one after clashing with Huff who had been tapped by Menu. Farfus dropped down to fourth as Huff took the lead followed by Menu and Coronel. Tarquini was caught up the first corner contact and was forced to retire with damage to his SEAT León 2.0 TDI. Further back, Fredy Barth collided with Jordi Gené while Andrei Romanov and Taniguchi did likewise. Huff was later given a drive–through penalty for his part in the clash with Farfus, he failed to serve his penalty within the required three laps and was black–flagged. Farfus had passed Coronel and was closing in on new race leader Menu but couldn't catch him before the finish, finishing second with Muller finishing third. Coronel was fourth, Monteiro was fifth and Priaulx was sixth having started third. Michelisz finished eight to claim pole position for race two and Kristian Poulsen was independent winner.

=== Race Two ===
Starting from third on the grid, Priaulx passed pole sitter Michelisz to take the lead of the race at the first corner. Monteiro bumped off both Nykjær and Michelisz and later served a drive–through penalty. Monteiro's penalty promoted Farfus into second and Muller into third. Towards the end of the race, Menu and Michelisz had been running seventh and eighth but were being caught by Huff, Tarquini and Gené. Huff tapped Michelisz wide at turn one and the Zengő driver dropped to eleventh and out of the points behind the advancing trio. Huff went on to catch Menu at the end of the race as the BMW Team RBM pair finished 1–2 on home turf with Muller the final podium finished and Poulsen repeated his Independents' Trophy victory from race one.

== Results ==
=== Qualifying ===
Pos.	No.	Name	Team	Car	C	Q1	Q2
1	10	(Brazil) Augusto Farfus	BMW Team RBM	BMW 320si		1:36.228	1:38.070
2	7	(United Kingdom) Robert Huff	Chevrolet RML	Chevrolet Cruze LT		1:35.518	1:38.176
3	11	(United Kingdom) Andy Priaulx	BMW Team RBM	BMW 320si		1:36.326	1:38.186
4	8	(Switzerland) Alain Menu	Chevrolet RML	Chevrolet Cruze LT		1:36.174	1:38.445
5	5	(Hungary) Norbert Michelisz	Zengő-Dension Team	SEAT León 2.0 TDI		1:36.131	1:38.634
6	1	(Italy) Gabriele Tarquini	SR-Sport	SEAT León 2.0 TDI		1:36.027	1:38.796
7	2	(Netherlands) Tom Coronel	SR-Sport	SEAT León 2.0 TDI		1:36.509	1:38.810
8	6	(France) Yvan Muller	Chevrolet RML	Chevrolet Cruze LT		1:36.111	1:38.869
9	4	(Spain) Jordi Gené	SR-Sport	SEAT León 2.0 TDI		1:36.071	1:39.994
10	3	(Portugal) Tiago Monteiro	SR-Sport	SEAT León 2.0 TDI		1:36.537	no time set
11	17	(Denmark) Michel Nykjær	SUNRED Engineering	SEAT León 2.0 TDI		1:36.654	
12	18	(Switzerland) Fredy Barth	SEAT Swiss Racing by SUNRED	SEAT León 2.0 TDI		1:36.844	
13	26	(Italy) Stefano D'Aste	Scuderia Proteam Motorsport	BMW 320si	Y	1:36.881	
14	25	(Spain) Sergio Hernández	Scuderia Proteam Motorsport	BMW 320si	Y	1:37.282	
15	15	(Germany) Franz Engstler	Liqui Moly Team Engstler	BMW 320si	Y	1:37.309	
16	20	(Hong Kong) Darryl O'Young	bamboo-engineering	Chevrolet Lacetti	Y	1:37.532	
17	24	(Denmark) Kristian Poulsen	Poulsen Motorsport	BMW 320si	Y	1:37.579	
18	21	(Morocco) Mehdi Bennani	Wiechers-Sport	BMW 320si	Y	1:38.091	
19	72	(Japan) Yukinori Taniguchi	bamboo-engineering	Chevrolet Lacetti	Y	1:38.203	
20	16	(Russia) Andrei Romanov	Liqui Moly Team Engstler	BMW 320si	Y	1:39.190	
21	33	(Italy) Fabio Fabiani	Scuderia Proteam Motorsport	BMW 320si	Y	1:41.877	

=== Race 1 ===
Pos.	No.	Name	Team	Car	C	Laps	Time/Retired	Grid	Points
1	8	(Switzerland) **Alain Menu**	Chevrolet RML	Chevrolet Cruze LT		14	22:50.427	4	25
2	10	(Brazil) Augusto Farfus	BMW Team RBM	BMW 320si		14	+0.491	1	18
3	6	(France) Yvan Muller	Chevrolet RML	Chevrolet Cruze LT		14	+4.738	7	15
4	3	(Portugal) Tiago Monteiro	SR-Sport	SEAT León 2.0 TDI		14	+7.428	9	12
5	11	(United Kingdom) Andy Priaulx	BMW Team RBM	BMW 320si		14	+7.845	3	10
6^{1}	2	(Netherlands) Tom Coronel	SR-Sport	SEAT León 2.0 TDI		14	+36.835	6	8
7^{1}	17	(Denmark) Michel Nykjær	SUNRED Engineering	SEAT León 2.0 TDI		14	+43.063	10	6
8^{1}	5	(Hungary) Norbert Michelisz	Zengő-Dension Team	SEAT León 2.0 TDI		14	+46.187	15	4
9^{1}	24	(Denmark) Kristian Poulsen	Poulsen Motorsport	BMW 320si	Y	14	+46.449	17	2
10^{1}	25	(Spain) Sergio Hernández	Scuderia Proteam Motorsport	BMW 320si	Y	14	+47.897	13	1
11^{1}	18	(Switzerland) Fredy Barth	SEAT Swiss Racing by SUNRED	SEAT León 2.0 TDI		14	+50.146	11	
12^{1}	4	(Spain) Jordi Gené	SR-Sport	SEAT León 2.0 TDI		14	+50.584	8	
13^{1}	15	(Germany) Franz Engstler	Liqui Moly Team Engstler	BMW 320si	Y	14	+1:02.077	14	
14^{1}	21	(Morocco) Mehdi Bennani	Wiechers-Sport	BMW 320si	Y	14	+1:04.005	18	
15^{1}	26	(Italy) Stefano D'Aste	Scuderia Proteam Motorsport	BMW 320si	Y	14	+1:04.164	12	
16^{1}	16	(Russia) Andrei Romanov	Liqui Moly Team Engstler	BMW 320si	Y	14	+1:06.208	20	
17^{1}	72	(Japan) Yukinori Taniguchi	bamboo-engineering	Chevrolet Lacetti	Y	14	+1:15.550	19	
18	7	(United Kingdom) Robert Huff	Chevrolet RML	Chevrolet Cruze LT		10	+4 Laps	2	
NC	33	(Italy) Fabio Fabiani	Scuderia Proteam Motorsport	BMW 320si	Y	6	+8 Laps	21	
NC	20	(Hong Kong) Darryl O'Young	bamboo-engineering	Chevrolet Lacetti	Y	5	+9 Laps	16	
Ret	1	(Italy) Gabriele Tarquini	SR-Sport	SEAT León 2.0 TDI		0	Race incident	5	

- **Bold** denotes Fastest lap.

^1 — Coronel, Gené, Michelisz, Franz Engstler, Romanov, Nykjær, Barth, Mehdi Bennani, Poulsen, Hernández, D'Aste and Taniguchi all received 30–second post race penalties for breaking the speed limit during the rolling start.

=== Race 2 ===
Pos.	No.	Name	Team	Car	C	Laps	Time/Retired	Grid	Points
1	11	(United Kingdom) Andy Priaulx	BMW Team RBM	BMW 320si		14	22:51.499	3	25
2	10	(Brazil) Augusto Farfus	BMW Team RBM	BMW 320si		14	+2.729	7	18
3	6	(France) Yvan Muller	Chevrolet RML	Chevrolet Cruze LT		14	+8.740	6	15
4	17	(Denmark) Michel Nykjær	SUNRED Engineering	SEAT León 2.0 TDI		14	+10.304	2	12
5	2	(Netherlands) Tom Coronel	SR-Sport	SEAT León 2.0 TDI		14	+10.982	5	10
6	24	(Denmark) Kristian Poulsen	Poulsen Motorsport	BMW 320si	Y	14	+11.989	9	8
7	7	(United Kingdom) Robert Huff	Chevrolet RML	Chevrolet Cruze LT		14	+16.691	17	6
8	8	(Switzerland) Alain Menu	Chevrolet RML	Chevrolet Cruze LT		14	+17.243	8	4
9	1	(Italy) **Gabriele Tarquini**	SR-Sport	SEAT León 2.0 TDI		14	+17.919	20	2
10	4	(Spain) Jordi Gené	SR-Sport	SEAT León 2.0 TDI		14	+19.193	12	1
11	5	(Hungary) Norbert Michelisz	Zengő-Dension Team	SEAT León 2.0 TDI		14	+20.295	1	
12	20	(Hong Kong) Darryl O'Young	bamboo-engineering	Chevrolet Lacetti	Y	14	+22.964	19	
13	25	(Spain) Sergio Hernández	Scuderia Proteam Motorsport	BMW 320si	Y	14	+23.582	10	
14	72	(Japan) Yukinori Taniguchi	bamboo-engineering	Chevrolet Lacetti	Y	14	+35.324	16	
15	15	(Germany) Franz Engstler	Liqui Moly Team Engstler	BMW 320si	Y	14	+38.679	13	
16	26	(Italy) Stefano D'Aste	Scuderia Proteam Motorsport	BMW 320si	Y	14	+47.949	15	
17^{1}	16	(Russia) Andrei Romanov	Liqui Moly Team Engstler	BMW 320si	Y	14	+1:02.831	21	
18^{2}	3	(Portugal) Tiago Monteiro	SR-Sport	SEAT León 2.0 TDI		14	+1:04.318	4	
19	33	(Italy) Fabio Fabiani	Scuderia Proteam Motorsport	BMW 320si	Y	14	+1:28.517	18	
20	18	(Switzerland) Fredy Barth	SEAT Swiss Racing by SUNRED	SEAT León 2.0 TDI		13	+1 Lap	11	
Ret	21	(Morocco) Mehdi Bennani	Wiechers-Sport	BMW 320si	Y	0	Race incident	14	

- **Bold** denotes Fastest lap.

^1 — Romanov was given a 30–second penalty after the race a 10–place suspended grid penalty for the next two events for causing a collision.
^2 — Monteiro was given a 30–second post–race penalty in addition to the driver–through penalty he served on lap six for a collision.

== Standings after the event ==
Drivers' Championship standings

	Pos	Driver	Points
	1	(France) Yvan Muller	229
1	2	(United Kingdom) Andy Priaulx	218
1	3	(Italy) Gabriele Tarquini	196
	4	(United Kingdom) Robert Huff	173
	5	(Switzerland) Alain Menu	145

Yokohama Independents' Trophy standings

	Pos	Driver	Points
	1	(Spain) Sergio Hernández	111
	2	(Italy) Stefano D'Aste	86
1	3	(Hong Kong) Darryl O'Young	76
1	4	(United Kingdom) Colin Turkington	73
	5	(Germany) Franz Engstler	70

Manufacturers' Championship standings

	Pos	Manufacturer	Points
	1	(United States) Chevrolet	508
1	2	(Germany) BMW	453
1	3	(Spain) SEAT Customers Technology	447

- Note: Only the top five positions are included for both sets of drivers' standings.
