= Timur Sadredinov =

Russian auto racing driver (born 1989)

Timur Irfanovich Sadredinov (Russian: Тиму́р Ирфа́нович Садреди́нов, IPA: [tʲɪˈmur ɪrˈfanəvʲɪtɕ sədrʲɪˈdʲinəf], born 10 May 1989 in Moscow) is a Russian auto racing driver.

== Career ==
In 2007 he became the youngest ever driver to compete in the FIA World Touring Car Championship. He competed in two rounds at Oschersleben for GR Asia in a SEAT León, after impressing in the German SEAT Leon Supercopa. An encouraging debut saw him finish thirteenth in race one, and nineteenth in the second race. For the next event at Brands Hatch, Sadredinov was also due to race. Problems with his passport for getting into the United Kingdom meant he was replaced by fellow Russian driver Sergey Krylov.

=== Complete WTCC results ===
(key) (Races in bold indicate pole position) (Races in italics indicate fastest lap)

Year	Team	Car	1	2	3	4	5	6	7	8		9	10	11	Position	Points
2007	GR Asia	SEAT León	CUR	ZAN	VAL	PAU	BRN	POR	AND	OSC		BRA	MNZ	MAC	NC	0
2007	GR Asia	SEAT León								13	19				NC	0
