= Evgeny Zelenov =

Russian racing driver

Evgeny Zelenov (born 5 July 1966 in Vladivostok) is a Russian auto racing driver. He competed in one rounds of the 2007 FIA World Touring Car Championship at Zandvoort. Driving for the Russian Bears Motorsport team in a BMW 320i, his best finish was a twenty-first place in race one. Zelenov has also raced in the Russian touring Car championship and the Dutch Supercar Challenge.

== Complete WTCC results ==
(key) (Races in bold indicate pole position) (Races in italics indicate fastest lap)

Year	Team	Car	1	2		3	4	5	6	7	8	9	10	11	Position	Points
2007	Russian Bears Motorsport	BMW 320i	CUR (Brazil)	ZAN (Netherlands)		VAL (Spain)	PAU (France)	BRN (Czech Republic)	POR (Portugal)	AND (Sweden)	OSC (Germany)	BRA (United Kingdom)	MON (Italy)	MAC (Macau)	NC	0
2007	Russian Bears Motorsport	BMW 320i		21	24										NC	0
