= Luís Pedro Magalhães =

Portuguese racing driver

Luís Pedro Magalhães (born 4 February 1972 in Mozambique) is a Portuguese auto racing driver.

== Career ==
Magalhães competed in his home round of the 2007 World Touring Car Championship season, the Race of Portugal on the Circuito da Boavista around the streets of Porto, where he is a resident. He raced a SEAT Leon for Exagon Engineering to raise funds for the Portuguese League against Cancer. He had been diagnosed with the disease the previous year and gained support from former Formula One drivers Pedro Lamy and Pedro Chaves. He finished the two races in 21st and 17th place.
