= David Louie (racing driver) =

Hong Kong racing driver

David Louie (born 1962) is a Hong Kong auto racing driver.

== Career ==
Louie competed in the final round of the 2007 FIA World Touring Car Championship at Macau. He drove a BMW 320i prepared by the Engstler Motorsport team. The car was not homologated due to its sequential gearbox, so he was not eligible to score any championship points. He managed a 25th place in race one and retired from race two. He had previously competed in Chinese and Asian Formula Renault.

=== Complete WTCC results ===
(key) (Races in bold indicate pole position) (Races in italics indicate fastest lap)

Year	Team	Car	1	2	3	4	5	6	7	8	9	10	11		Position	Points
2007	Engstler Motorsport	BMW 320i	CUR (Brazil)	ZAN (Netherlands)	VAL (Spain)	PAU (France)	BRN (Czech Republic)	POR (Portugal)	AND (Sweden)	OSC (Germany)	BRA (United Kingdom)	MON (Italy)	MAC (Macau)		NC*	0*
2007	Engstler Motorsport	BMW 320i											25	Ret	NC*	0*

* Louie was not eligible to score championship points
