= Lev Fridman =

Russian auto racing driver

- Born: Lev Grigorievich Fridman; 14 August 1969 (age 57)
- Teams: Russian Bears Motorsport Team

Lev Grigorievich Fridman (born 14 August 1969 in Sverdlovsk) is a Russian auto racing driver. Career highlights include finishing third in the 2006 Russian Touring Car Championship. He competed in four rounds of the 2007 FIA World Touring Car Championship at Zandvoort and Valencia. Driving for the Russian Bears Motorsport Team in a BMW 320i, his best placed finish was a nineteenth in his first race in round three. In 2008, he drove in the Dutch Supercar Challenge with the Russian Bears Team.
