= 2010 FIA WTCC Race of Italy =

Touring car race at Monza

Race details
- Round 3 of 11 in the 2010 World Touring Car Championship at Autodromo Nazionale di Monza in Monza, Italy.
- Date: 23 May, 2010
- Location: Monza, Italy
- Course: Autodromo Nazionale di Monza; 5.793 kilometres (3.600 mi)

Race One
- Laps: 9
Pole position
Driver		(Brazil) Augusto Farfus	BMW Team RBM
Time		2:00.672	
Podium
First		(United Kingdom) Andy Priaulx	BMW Team RBM
Second		(Brazil) Augusto Farfus	BMW Team RBM
Third		(United Kingdom) Robert Huff	Chevrolet RML
Fastest Lap
Driver		(Italy) Gabriele Tarquini	SR-Sport
Time		2:01.590	

Race Two
- Laps: 9
Podium
First		(France) Yvan Muller	Chevrolet RML
Second		(Netherlands) Tom Coronel	SR-Sport
Third		(United Kingdom) Robert Huff	Chevrolet RML
Fastest Lap
Driver		(United Kingdom) Andy Priaulx	BMW Team RBM
Time		2:01.860	

The 2010 FIA WTCC Race of Italy (formally the 2010 FIA WTCC Yokohama Race of Italy) was the third round of the 2010 World Touring Car Championship season and the sixth running of the FIA WTCC Race of Italy. It was held at the Autodromo Nazionale di Monza, in Monza, Italy on 23 May 2010. The two races were won by Andy Priaulx for BMW Team RBM and Yvan Muller for Chevrolet RML.

== Background ==
After the second round of the season in Morocco, defending champion Gabriele Tarquini was leading the drivers' standings by seven points over Yvan Muller. Franz Engstler was leading the Yokohama Independents' Trophy.

Kristian Poulsen returned to the championship with his self–run Poulsen Motorsport team. He last raced with Liqui Moly Team Engstler at the 2009 Guia Race of Macau. Meanwhile Scuderia Proteam Motorsport added a third BMW 320si to their team for Italian driver Fabio Fabiani. Chevrolet Motorsport Sweden joined the grid for the Italian round, running a Chevrolet Cruze LT for TC 2000 Championship driver Leonel Pernía who became the first Argentine to race in the World Touring Car Championship.

== Report ==
=== Testing and free practice ===
BMW Team RBM driver Augusto Farfus was the fastest driver in Friday's test session, beating the Chevrolet of Muller and the SEAT of Tom Coronel. Championship leader Tarquini was fourth and Pernía was thirteenth on his first run in a Super 2000 car. Priaulx suffered a brake disk failure at the end of the pit straight and nearly collided with Alain Menu while Fredy Barth, Sergio Hernández and Mehdi Bennani all saw reduced running due to technical issues.

Tarquini topped the times in the first practice session on Saturday morning, two–tenths of a second ahead of Priaulx. Jordi Gené was third and Robert Huff was the fastest Chevrolet in fourth. Andrei Romanov required an engine change and as a result incurred a ten–place grid penalty for race one.

Chevrolet were fastest in the final practice session with Huff beating the BMW of Priaulx by less than a tenth of a second. Morning pace setter Tarquini was third while Huff's teammates Menu and Muller were fourth and fifth respectively.

=== Qualifying ===
Tarquini was fastest in Q1 for SR-Sport, ahead of the Chevrolet pairing of Huff and Muller. In Q2 the diesel-powered SEATs followed each other round the circuit to use teamwork and slipstreaming to get good times. However, Tarquini ran wide at the second Lesmo with Barth also following him into the dirt. This ruined their laptimes, resulting in the BMWs and Chevrolets locking out the first two rows of the grid, with Augusto Farfus on pole position ahead of Huff, Priaulx, Menu and Muller. Gené was the first SEAT in 6th, with Tarquini in 7th.

=== Warm-Up ===
Priaulx topped the Sunday morning warm–up session with pole sitter and teammate Farfus fourth. Pernía and Hernández had problems meaning they couldn't set competitive lap times.

=== Race One ===
Huff moved past polesitter Farfus at the start of Race One. Tarquini, meanwhile, moved from seventh to second in the run to the first chicane. Behind, many drivers cut across the grass at the chicane, while Kristian Poulsen and Darryl O'Young collided, both limping back to the pits to retire. Tarquini passed Huff at the start of the second lap and the pair began to stretch the gap back to third-placed Priaulx. However, on the final lap, Tarquini suffered a front-left puncture on the run down to the Ascari chicane. As Huff moved out to pass him, he also suffered a front-left puncture. The pair limped down the following straight, with Priaulx and the following pack closing them down. However, the leading pair could not be passed initially, with yellow flags out at the beginning of the Parabolica after Leonel Pernía had slid into the gravel on the previous lap. Once the green flags were shown, Priaulx and Farfus passed the slowing Tarquini and then Huff, to take a dramatic one-two finish for BMW. Behind, Michel Nykjær had also suffered a puncture. Huff limped past the line to finish third, ahead of Muller, Coronel and Barth. Tarquini and Nykjær finished seventh and eighth, ahead of Tiago Monteiro and Bennani. Bennani however was given a 30-second penalty after the race for cutting the first chicane on the opening lap, handing tenth place and a first Independents' Trophy victory to Harry Vaulkhard.

=== Race Two ===
Nykjær made a good start from pole position in Race Two, while Muller moved up from fifth to second before the first chicane. Tarquini regained second from Muller and briefly took the lead of the race from Nykjær. Tarquini was then awarded a drive-through penalty for creeping forward on the grid before the lights had gone out. Bennani was also given a penalty having made a much more obvious jump start. Before Tarquini could serve his penalty though, he was re-passed by Nykjær at the first chicane. The Dane led the race until the last lap when he suffered a puncture, pulling off the track and retiring at the second chicane. This handed Muller the victory, ahead of Coronel, Huff, Farfus and Priaulx. Having served his drive-through penalty, Tarquini returned to the pits to retire on the following lap.

== Results ==
=== Qualifying ===
Pos.	No.	Name	Team	Car	C	Q1	Q2
1	10	(Brazil) Augusto Farfus	BMW Team RBM	BMW 320si		2:01.126	2:00.672
2	7	(United Kingdom) Robert Huff	Chevrolet RML	Chevrolet Cruze LT		2:00.775	2:00.697
3	11	(United Kingdom) Andy Priaulx	BMW Team RBM	BMW 320si		2:00.941	2:00.807
4	8	(Switzerland) Alain Menu	Chevrolet RML	Chevrolet Cruze LT		2:01.091	2:00.899
5	6	(France) Yvan Muller	Chevrolet RML	Chevrolet Cruze LT		2:00.834	2:01.078
6	4	(Spain) Jordi Gené	SR-Sport	SEAT León 2.0 TDI		2:01.629	2:01.400
7	1	(Italy) Gabriele Tarquini	SR-Sport	SEAT León 2.0 TDI		2:00.690	2:01.544
8	5	(Hungary) Norbert Michelisz	Zengő-Dension Team	SEAT León 2.0 TDI		2:01.006	2:01.731
9	18	(Switzerland) Fredy Barth	SEAT Swiss Racing by SUNRED	SEAT León 2.0 TDI		2:01.581	2:01.926
10	3	(Portugal) Tiago Monteiro	SR-Sport	SEAT León 2.0 TDI		2:00.862	2:01.927
11	17	(Denmark) Michel Nykjær	SUNRED Engineering	SEAT León 2.0 TDI		2:01.765	
12	20	(Hong Kong) Darryl O'Young	bamboo-engineering	Chevrolet Lacetti	Y	2:02.186	
13	2	(Netherlands) Tom Coronel	SR-Sport	SEAT León 2.0 TDI		2:02.235	
14	19	(United Kingdom) Harry Vaulkhard	bamboo-engineering	Chevrolet Lacetti	Y	2:02.384	
15	34	(Argentina) Leonel Pernía	Chevrolet Motorsport Sweden	Chevrolet Cruze LT		2:02.441	
16	21	(Morocco) Mehdi Bennani	Wiechers-Sport	BMW 320si	Y	2:02.829	
17	24	(Denmark) Kristian Poulsen	Poulsen Motorsport	BMW 320si	Y	2:02.834	
18	15	(Germany) Franz Engstler	Liqui Moly Team Engstler	BMW 320si	Y	2:02.983	
19	26	(Italy) Stefano D'Aste	Scuderia Proteam Motorsport	BMW 320si	Y	2:03.276	
20	25	(Spain) Sergio Hernández	Scuderia Proteam Motorsport	BMW 320si	Y	2:04.260	
21	16	(Russia) Andrei Romanov	Liqui Moly Team Engstler	BMW 320si	Y	2:04.327	
22	33	(Italy) Fabio Fabiani	Scuderia Proteam Motorsport	BMW 320si	Y	2:08.144	

=== Race 1 ===
Pos.	No.	Name	Team	Car	C	Laps	Time/Retired	Grid	Points
1	11	(United Kingdom) Andy Priaulx	BMW Team RBM	BMW 320si		9	18:32.008	3	25
2	10	(Brazil) Augusto Farfus	BMW Team RBM	BMW 320si		9	+0.248	1	18
3	7	(United Kingdom) Robert Huff	Chevrolet RML	Chevrolet Cruze LT		9	+1.653	2	15
4	6	(France) Yvan Muller	Chevrolet RML	Chevrolet Cruze LT		9	+1.820	5	12
5	2	(Netherlands) Tom Coronel	SR-Sport	SEAT León 2.0 TDI		9	+2.271	12	10
6	18	(Switzerland) Fredy Barth	SEAT Swiss Racing by SUNRED	SEAT León 2.0 TDI		9	+2.308	9	8
7	1	(Italy) **Gabriele Tarquini**	SR-Sport	SEAT León 2.0 TDI		9	+2.375	7	6
8	17	(Denmark) Michel Nykjær	SUNRED Engineering	SEAT León 2.0 TDI		9	+2.726	10	4
9	3	(Portugal) Tiago Monteiro	SR-Sport	SEAT León 2.0 TDI		9	+3.243	15	2
10	19	(United Kingdom) Harry Vaulkhard	bamboo-engineering	Chevrolet Lacetti	Y	9	+9.032	13	1
11	26	(Italy) Stefano D'Aste	Scuderia Proteam Motorsport	BMW 320si	Y	9	+10.000	19	
12	25	(Spain) Sergio Hernández	Scuderia Proteam Motorsport	BMW 320si	Y	9	+11.575	20	
13	16	(Russia) Andrei Romanov	Liqui Moly Team Engstler	BMW 320si	Y	9	+30.320	22	
14	21	(Morocco) Mehdi Bennani	Wiechers-Sport	BMW 320si	Y	9	+33.972	16	
15	33	(Italy) Fabio Fabiani	Scuderia Proteam Motorsport	BMW 320si	Y	9	+59.155	21	
16	4	(Spain) Jordi Gené	SR-Sport	SEAT León 2.0 TDI		8	+1 Lap	6	
17	8	(Switzerland) Alain Menu	Chevrolet RML	Chevrolet Cruze LT		8	+1 Lap	4	
18	34	(Argentina) Leonel Pernía	Chevrolet Motorsport Sweden	Chevrolet Cruze LT		7	+2 Laps	14	
19	5	(Hungary) Norbert Michelisz	Zengő-Dension Team	SEAT León 2.0 TDI		7	+2 Laps	8	
Ret	15	(Germany) Franz Engstler	Liqui Moly Team Engstler	BMW 320si	Y	3	Engine	18	
Ret	20	(Hong Kong) Darryl O'Young	bamboo-engineering	Chevrolet Lacetti	Y	1	Race incident	11	
Ret	24	(Denmark) Kristian Poulsen	Poulsen Motorsport	BMW 320si	Y	1	Race incident	17	

- **Bold** denotes Fastest lap.

=== Race 2 ===
Pos.	No.	Name	Team	Car	C	Laps	Time/Retired	Grid	Points
1	6	(France) Yvan Muller	Chevrolet RML	Chevrolet Cruze LT		9	18:29.805	5	25
2	2	(Netherlands) Tom Coronel	SR-Sport	SEAT León 2.0 TDI		9	+0.512	4	18
3	7	(United Kingdom) Robert Huff	Chevrolet RML	Chevrolet Cruze LT		9	+0.822	6	15
4	10	(Brazil) Augusto Farfus	BMW Team RBM	BMW 320si		9	+1.001	7	12
5	11	(United Kingdom) **Andy Priaulx'**	BMW Team RBM	BMW 320si		9	+1.742	8	10
6	4	(Spain) Jordi Gené	SR-Sport	SEAT León 2.0 TDI		9	+3.495	16	8
7	3	(Portugal) Tiago Monteiro	SR-Sport	SEAT León 2.0 TDI		9	+4.197	9	6
8	5	(Hungary) Norbert Michelisz	Zengő-Dension Team	SEAT León 2.0 TDI		9	+4.580	18	4
9	8	(Switzerland) Alain Menu	Chevrolet RML	Chevrolet Cruze LT		9	+5.099	17	2
10	34	(Argentina) Leonel Pernía	Chevrolet Motorsport Sweden	Chevrolet Cruze LT		9	+9.918	20	1
11	26	(Italy) Stefano D'Aste	Scuderia Proteam Motorsport	BMW 320si	Y	9	+11.856	12	
12	20	(Hong Kong) Darryl O'Young	bamboo-engineering	Chevrolet Lacetti	Y	9	+13.499	19	
13	19	(United Kingdom) Harry Vaulkhard	bamboo-engineering	Chevrolet Lacetti	Y	9	+14.368	11	
14	18	(Switzerland) Fredy Barth	SEAT Swiss Racing by SUNRED	SEAT León 2.0 TDI		9	+14.506	3	
15	24	(Denmark) Kristian Poulsen	Poulsen Motorsport	BMW 320si	Y	9	+14.836	21	
16	25	(Spain) Sergio Hernández	Scuderia Proteam Motorsport	BMW 320si	Y	9	+15.266	13	
17	21	(Morocco) Mehdi Bennani	Wiechers-Sport	BMW 320si	Y	9	+33.557	10	
18	33	(Italy) Fabio Fabiani	Scuderia Proteam Motorsport	BMW 320si	Y	9	+49.454	15	
19	17	(Denmark) Michel Nykjær	SUNRED Engineering	SEAT León 2.0 TDI		8	+1 Lap	1	
20	1	(Italy) Gabriele Tarquini	SR-Sport	SEAT León 2.0 TDI		6	+3 Laps	2	
Ret	16	(Russia) Andrei Romanov	Liqui Moly Team Engstler	BMW 320si	Y	2	Oil pressure	14	
DNS	15	(Germany) Franz Engstler	Liqui Moly Team Engstler	BMW 320si	Y	0	Did not start	22	

- **Bold** denotes Fastest lap.

== Standings after the event ==
Drivers' Championship standings

	Pos	Driver	Points
1	1	(France) Yvan Muller	100
1	2	(Italy) Gabriele Tarquini	76
	3	(United Kingdom) Robert Huff	76
	4	(United Kingdom) Andy Priaulx	74
3	5	(Netherlands) Tom Coronel	57

Yokohama Independents' Trophy standings

	Pos	Driver	Points
1	1	(Spain) Sergio Hernández	41
2	2	(Italy) Stefano D'Aste	36
	3	(Morocco) Mehdi Bennani	35
3	4	(Germany) Franz Engstler	34
1	5	(United Kingdom) Harry Vaulkhard	32

Manufacturers' Championship standings

	Pos	Manufacturer	Points
1	1	(United States) Chevrolet	193
1	2	(Spain) SEAT Customers Technology	177
	3	(Germany) BMW	158

- Note: Only the top five positions are included for both sets of drivers' standings.
