= Miguel Freitas =

Portuguese racing driver

Miguel Freitas (born 2 March 1984 in Lisbon) is a Portuguese auto racing driver.

== Career ==
Freitas competed in the Mégane Trophy Eurocup in 2005 and 2006 for the Racing for Belgium team. In 2006, he competed at the European Touring Car Cup for Zerocinque Motorsport.

Freitas and the Racing for Belgium team stepped up to the World Touring Car Championship in 2007 racing an Alfa Romeo 156 at seven of the eleven rounds of the championship. Freitas took a best finish of 15th place.

In 2008, Freitas competed in the Spanish SEAT León Supercopa with the Oasis Motorsport team, finishing in eighth place. In addition to the Supercopa campaign in 2009 he took part in his home round of the SEAT León Eurocup.

=== Complete World Touring Car Championship results ===
(key) (Races in bold indicate pole position) (Races in italics indicate fastest lap)

Year	Team	Car	1	2	3	4	5	6	7	8	9	10	11	12	13	14	15	16	17	18	19	20	21	22	DC	Points
2007	Racing for Belgium	Alfa Romeo 156	BRA; 1	BRA; 2	NED; 1 Ret	NED; 2; 21	ESP; 1; 16	ESP; 2 Ret	FRA; 1; 16	FRA; 2 Ret	CZE; 1; 21	CZE; 2; 18	POR; 1; 19	POR; 2 Ret	SWE; 1	SWE; 2	GER; 1	GER; 2	GBR; 1	GBR; 2	ITA; 1; 20	ITA; 2; 15	MAC; 1; 23	MAC; 2; 19	NC	0
