= 2010 FIA WTCC Race of the Czech Republic =

Seventh round of the 2010 WTCC season

Race details
- Round 7 of 11 in the 2010 World Touring Car Championship at Masaryk Circuit in Brno, Czech Republic.
- Date: 1 August, 2010
- Location: Brno, Czech Republic
- Course: Masaryk Circuit; 5.403 kilometres (3.357 mi)

Race One
- Laps: 12
Pole position
Driver		(United Kingdom) Robert Huff	Chevrolet RML
Time		2:10.860	
Podium
First		(United Kingdom) Robert Huff	Chevrolet RML
Second		(Italy) Gabriele Tarquini	SR-Sport
Third		(Switzerland) Alain Menu	Chevrolet RML
Fastest Lap
Driver		(Brazil) Augusto Farfus	BMW Team RBM
Time		2:12.167	

Race Two
- Laps: 10
Podium
First		(United Kingdom) Andy Priaulx	BMW Team RBM
Second		(United Kingdom) Colin Turkington	eBay Motors
Third		(Switzerland) Alain Menu	Chevrolet RML
Fastest Lap
Driver		(Italy) Gabriele Tarquini	SR-Sport
Time		2:12.737	

The 2010 FIA WTCC Race of the Czech Republic (formally the 2010 FIA WTCC Monroe Race of the Czech Republic) was the seventh round of the 2010 World Touring Car Championship season and the fifth running of the Race of the Czech Republic. It was held at the Masaryk Circuit near Brno, Czech Republic on 1 August 2010. The two races were won by Robert Huff of Chevrolet RML and Andy Priaulx of BMW Team RBM.

== Background ==
Coming into the round, Yvan Muller was leading the drivers' championship and Sergio Hernández was leading the Yokohama Independents' Trophy.

After missing the previous round at Brands Hatch for personal reason, Andrei Romanov returned to Liqui Moly Team Engstler. Fabio Fabiani returned to Scuderia Proteam Motorsport having last raced for the team at the Race of Italy.

Changes were made to the Independents' Trophy after the Race of UK. As well as the usual independents' points systems, additional points are awarded for each point scored in the main drivers' championship. After Colin Turkington's success at Brands Hatch, the number of additional points was limited to twelve to prevent a repeat of this.

== Report ==
=== Free practice ===
Chevrolet's Alain Menu set the pace in free practice one with SR-Sport's Gabriele Tarquini second and BMW driver Turkington third. Yokohama Trophy leader Hernández was tenth while overall championship leader Muller was sixteenth.

Turkington led free practice two, nearly half a second quicker than Muller. The session was brought to an early close when Tiago Monteiro beached his SEAT León TDI in a gravel trap.

=== Qualifying ===
Huff claimed his first pole position of the season in qualifying, lining up alongside Tarquini on the front row. Huff had been quickest in Q1, the surprise drop–outs from the first segment being the works BMW of Priaulx and SR–Sport driver Monteiro. Their efforts were spoilt by a red flag brought out by Fabiani who had beached his car in a gravel trap, the stoppage meant neither driver was able to set a time fast enough to progress through to the top ten shoot–out.

After Q2, Huff and Tarquini shared the front row with Turkington and Farfus behind. Huff's team mate Menu was fifth alongside Norbert Michelisz and Tom Coronel shared the fourth row with the third factory Chevrolet car of Muller. Jordi Gené and Michel Nykjær completed the top ten.

After lining up third in qualifying, Turkington was stripped of independent status and would now only be eligible for the main championship.

=== Warm-Up ===
Priaulx was quickest in the warm–up prior to the first race on Sunday morning. The fastest independent driver was Darryl O'Young in sixth while pole sitter Huff was eighth.

=== Race One ===
Huff depended from Tarquini at the rolling start and kept his lead into the first corner, escaping a first lap crash which caught out several of their rivals. Gené and Coronel retired while Priaulx, Kristian Poulsen and Fredy Barth continued with minor damage. The safety car was brought out while the wreckage was cleared, and on the restart Turkington and Michelisz clashed with the eBay Motors driver losing control and taking out championship leader Muller. Turkington continued while Michelisz retired and Muller returned to the pits for repairs. By now the front four of Huff, Tarquini, Menu and Augusto Farfus had broken away from the rest of the field led by Turkington although Priaulx eventually passed him on the last lap to finish fifth. Huff took the win with Tarquini second and Menu third. Poulsen was the independent winner by finishing eighth after a 30–second penalty was given to O'Young for causing a collision.

=== Race Two ===
O'Young started on pole position for race two although he was passed at the start by Priaulx from fourth on the grid. Turkington had leapt up from third to first at the start and at the end of the first lap Turkington lead Priaulx. Priaulx passed Turkington on the second lap while Tarquini, Menu and Huff closed in. On lap four Tarquini overshot the corner and dropped to fourth place behind Menu. Tarquini stopped two laps from the end with an injector failure, promoting Huff into fourth place. Priaulx took the win ahead of Turkington with Menu completing the podium for the second race in a row. O'Young was the independent winner while Muller finished twelfth, scoring no points over the course of the weekend.

== Results ==
=== Qualifying ===
Pos.	No.	Name	Team	Car	C	Q1	Q2
1	7	(United Kingdom) Robert Huff	Chevrolet RML	Chevrolet Cruze LT		2:10.611	2:10.860
2	1	(Italy) Gabriele Tarquini	SR-Sport	SEAT León 2.0 TDI		2:10.666	2:11.198
3	29	(United Kingdom) Colin Turkington	eBay Motors	BMW 320si	Y	2:11.179	2:11.205
4	10	(Brazil) Augusto Farfus	BMW Team RBM	BMW 320si		2:11.111	2.11.260
5	8	(Switzerland) Alain Menu	Chevrolet RML	Chevrolet Cruze LT		2:10.678	2:11.360
6	5	(Hungary) Norbert Michelisz	Zengő-Dension Team	SEAT León 2.0 TDI		2:11.601	2:11.436
7	2	(Netherlands) Tom Coronel	SR-Sport	SEAT León 2.0 TDI		2:11.498	2:11.528
8	6	(France) Yvan Muller	Chevrolet RML	Chevrolet Cruze LT		2:10.885	2:11.542
9	4	(Spain) Jordi Gené	SR-Sport	SEAT León 2.0 TDI		2:11.009	2:11.745
10	17	(Denmark) Michel Nykjær	SUNRED Engineering	SEAT León 2.0 TDI		2:11.750	2:11.826
11	11	(United Kingdom) Andy Priaulx	BMW Team RBM	BMW 320si		2:11.761	
12	24	(Denmark) Kristian Poulsen	Poulsen Motorsport	BMW 320si	Y	2:11.798	
13	25	(Spain) Sergio Hernández	Scuderia Proteam Motorsport	BMW 320si	Y	2:11.833	
14	3	(Portugal) Tiago Monteiro	SR-Sport	SEAT León 2.0 TDI		2:11.994	
15	20	(Hong Kong) Darryl O'Young	bamboo-engineering	Chevrolet Lacetti	Y	2:12.093	
16	18	(Switzerland) Fredy Barth	SEAT Swiss Racing by SUNRED	SEAT León 2.0 TDI		2:12.180	
17	21	(Morocco) Mehdi Bennani	Wiechers-Sport	BMW 320si	Y	2:12.496	
18	26	(Italy) Stefano D'Aste	Scuderia Proteam Motorsport	BMW 320si	Y	2:12.617	
19	15	(Germany) Franz Engstler	Liqui Moly Team Engstler	BMW 320si	Y	2:12.658	
20	19	(United Kingdom) Harry Vaulkhard	bamboo-engineering	Chevrolet Lacetti	Y	2:13.007	
21	16	(Russia) Andrei Romanov	Liqui Moly Team Engstler	BMW 320si	Y	2:13.989	
22	33	(Italy) Fabio Fabiani	Scuderia Proteam Motorsport	BMW 320si	Y	2:19.110	

=== Race 1 ===
Pos.	No.	Name	Team	Car	C	Laps	Time/Retired	Grid	Points
1	7	(United Kingdom) Robert Huff	Chevrolet RML	Chevrolet Cruze LT		12	28:46.901	1	25
2	1	(Italy) Gabriele Tarquini	SR-Sport	SEAT León 2.0 TDI		12	+0.796	2	18
3	8	(Switzerland) Alain Menu	Chevrolet RML	Chevrolet Cruze LT		12	+2.036	5	15
4	10	(Brazil) **Augusto Farfus**	BMW Team RBM	BMW 320si		12	+2.345	4	12
5	11	(United Kingdom) Andy Priaulx	BMW Team RBM	BMW 320si		12	+12.874	11	10
6	29	(United Kingdom) Colin Turkington	eBay Motors	BMW 320si		12	+13.202	3	8
7	17	(Denmark) Michel Nykjær	SUNRED Engineering	SEAT León 2.0 TDI		12	+14.256	10	6
8	24	(Denmark) Kristian Poulsen	Poulsen Motorsport	BMW 320si	Y	12	+15.680	12	4
9	3	(Portugal) Tiago Monteiro	SR-Sport	SEAT León 2.0 TDI		12	+16.524	14	2
10	26	(Italy) Stefano D'Aste	Scuderia Proteam Motorsport	BMW 320si	Y	12	+18.780	18	1
11	25	(Spain) Sergio Hernández	Scuderia Proteam Motorsport	BMW 320si	Y	12	+20.905	13	
12	18	(Switzerland) Fredy Barth	SEAT Swiss Racing by SUNRED	SEAT León 2.0 TDI		12	+21.363	16	
13	15	(Germany) Franz Engstler	Liqui Moly Team Engstler	BMW 320si	Y	12	+22.484	19	
14	21	(Morocco) Mehdi Bennani	Wiechers-Sport	BMW 320si	Y	12	+24.250	17	
15	19	(United Kingdom) Harry Vaulkhard	bamboo-engineering	Chevrolet Lacetti	Y	12	+26.554	20	
16	16	(Russia) Andrei Romanov	Liqui Moly Team Engstler	BMW 320si	Y	12	+39.022	21	
17^{1}	20	(Hong Kong) Darryl O'Young	bamboo-engineering	Chevrolet Lacetti	Y	12	+45.467	15	
18	33	(Italy) Fabio Fabiani	Scuderia Proteam Motorsport	BMW 320si	Y	12	+1:24.872	22	
NC	6	(France) Yvan Muller	Chevrolet RML	Chevrolet Cruze LT		6	+6 Laps	8	
Ret	5	(Hungary) Norbert Michelisz	Zengő-Dension Team	SEAT León 2.0 TDI		3	Race incident	6	
Ret	4	(Spain) Jordi Gené	SR-Sport	SEAT León 2.0 TDI		0	Race incident	9	
Ret	2	(Netherlands) Tom Coronel	SR-Sport	SEAT León 2.0 TDI		0	Race incident	7	

- **Bold** denotes Fastest lap.

^1 — O'Young originally finished in eighth position, but was given a 30-second penalty for causing a collision during the race.

=== Race 2 ===
Pos.	No.	Name	Team	Car	C	Laps	Time/Retired	Grid	Points
1	11	(United Kingdom) **Andy Priaulx**	BMW Team RBM	BMW 320si		10	22:22.054	4	25
2	29	(United Kingdom) Colin Turkington	eBay Motors	BMW 320si		10	+2.254	3	18
3	8	(Switzerland) Alain Menu	Chevrolet RML	Chevrolet Cruze LT		10	+3.353	6	15
4	7	(United Kingdom) Robert Huff	Chevrolet RML	Chevrolet Cruze LT		10	+5.347	8	12
5	10	(Brazil) Augusto Farfus	BMW Team RBM	BMW 320si		10	+5.724	5	10
6	3	(Portugal) Tiago Monteiro	SR-Sport	SEAT León 2.0 TDI		10	+7.501	10	8
7	20	(Hong Kong) Darryl O'Young	bamboo-engineering	Chevrolet Lacetti	Y	10	+10.212	1	6
8	18	(Switzerland) Fredy Barth	SEAT Swiss Racing by SUNRED	SEAT León 2.0 TDI		10	+11.698	13	4
9	26	(Italy) Stefano D'Aste	Scuderia Proteam Motorsport	BMW 320si	Y	10	+12.581	11	2
10	2	(Netherlands) Tom Coronel	SR-Sport	SEAT León 2.0 TDI		10	+16.584	21	1
11	25	(Spain) Sergio Hernández	Scuderia Proteam Motorsport	BMW 320si	Y	10	+19.233	12	
12	6	(France) Yvan Muller	Chevrolet RML	Chevrolet Cruze LT		10	+20.016	19	
13	4	(Spain) Jordi Gené	SR-Sport	SEAT León 2.0 TDI		10	+20.555	22	
14	5	(Hungary) Norbert Michelisz	Zengő-Dension Team	SEAT León 2.0 TDI		10	+20.837	20	
15	19	(United Kingdom) Harry Vaulkhard	bamboo-engineering	Chevrolet Lacetti	Y	10	+23.840	16	
16^{1}	21	(Morocco) Mehdi Bennani	Wiechers-Sport	BMW 320si	Y	10	+52.069	15	
17	16	(Russia) Andrei Romanov	Liqui Moly Team Engstler	BMW 320si	Y	10	+52.309	17	
18	1	(Italy) **Gabriele Tarquini**	SR-Sport	SEAT León 2.0 TDI		8	+2 Laps	7	
19	24	(Denmark) Kristian Poulsen	Poulsen Motorsport	BMW 320si	Y	8	+2 Laps	9	
20	33	(Italy) Fabio Fabiani	Scuderia Proteam Motorsport	BMW 320si	Y	8	+2 Laps	18	
Ret	15	(Germany) Franz Engstler	Liqui Moly Team Engstler	BMW 320si	Y	4	Race incident	14	
Ret	17	(Denmark) Michel Nykjær	SUNRED Engineering	SEAT León 2.0 TDI		0	Race incident	2	

- **Bold** denotes Fastest lap.

^1 — Bennani originally finished in 15th position, but was given a 30-second penalty for causing a collision during the race.

== Standings after the event ==
Drivers' Championship standings

	Pos	Driver	Points
	1	(France) Yvan Muller	199
	2	(Italy) Gabriele Tarquini	194
	3	(United Kingdom) Andy Priaulx	183
	4	(United Kingdom) Robert Huff	167
3	5	(Switzerland) Alain Menu	116

Yokohama Independents' Trophy standings

	Pos	Driver	Points
	1	(Spain) Sergio Hernández	96
1	2	(Italy) Stefano D'Aste	80
1	3	(United Kingdom) Colin Turkington	73
	4	(Hong Kong) Darryl O'Young	68
	5	(Germany) Franz Engstler	60

Manufacturers' Championship standings

Pos	Manufacturer	Points
1	(United States) Chevrolet	445
2	(Spain) SEAT Customers Technology	405
3	(Germany) BMW	382

- Note: Only the top five positions are included for both sets of drivers' standings.
