= FIA WTCC Race of Sweden =

Car race championship in Sweden

Race of Sweden
- Scandinavian Raceway (2007)

Race information
- Number of times held: 1
- First held: 2007
- Last held: 2007
- Most wins (drivers): (United Kingdom) Rob Huff (1) (Sweden) Rickard Rydell (1)
- Most wins (constructors): (United States) Chevrolet (2)

Last race (2007)
- Race 1 Winner: (United Kingdom) Rob Huff; (Chevrolet)
- Race 2 Winner: (Sweden) Rickard Rydell; (Chevrolet)

The FIA WTCC Race of Sweden was a round of the World Touring Car Championship, which was held at the Scandinavian Raceway in Anderstorp, Sweden during the 2007 season.

The race was introduced in 2007, replacing the Race of Turkey. Although the Swedish race was on the original 2008 calendar, it was canceled following a request from the Swedish National Sporting Authority after the WTCC failed to reach a commercial agreement with the event's promoters.

== Winners ==
Year	Race	Driver	Manufacturer	Location	Report
2007	Race 1	(United Kingdom) Rob Huff	Chevrolet	Anderstorp	Report
2007	Race 2	(Sweden) Rickard Rydell	Chevrolet	Anderstorp	Report
