= GR Asia =

Auto racing team

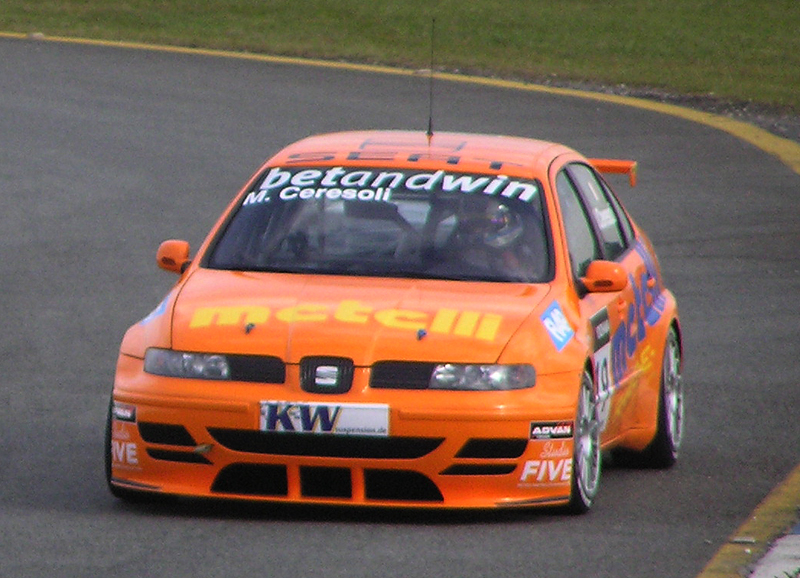
World Touring Car Championship 2006 Curitiba, after Qualify Maurizio Ceresoli (GR Asia – SEAT Toledo Cupra)

GR Asia is an auto racing team based in the United Kingdom and Hong Kong. They have raced in the World Touring Car Championship, the European Touring Car Championship and the British Touring Car Championship.

In 2006 they won the Independents championship in the WTCC with Tom Coronel. Initially entering the BTCC in 2000, GR ran in the class B category, running Ford Focus chassis, and again in 2001. They ran Adam Jones' Team Aircool entry in the BTCC in 2007 and 2008, and ran an additional car shared by Gavin Smith and Rob Collard at the end of the 2007 season. Ryan Sharp and Michel Nykjaer won the European Touring Car Cup for the team in 2006 and 2007 respectively. They ran Gordon Shedden's Club SEAT entry in the BTCC towards the end of the 2009 season.
