= 2008 FIA WTCC Race of France =

Fourth round of the 2008 World Touring Car Championship

Race details
- Round 4 of 12 in the 2008 World Touring Car Championship at Circuit de Pau in Pau, France.
- Date: 1 June, 2008
- Location: Pau, France
- Course: Circuit de Pau; 2.769 kilometres (1.721 mi)

Race One
- Laps: 19
Pole position
Driver		(Brazil) Augusto Farfus	BMW Team Germany
Time		1:21.960	
Podium
First		(Brazil) Augusto Farfus	BMW Team Germany
Second		(France) Yvan Muller	SEAT Sport
Third		(Spain) Jordi Gené	SEAT Sport
Fastest Lap
Driver		(Brazil) Augusto Farfus	BMW Team Germany
Time		1:22.682	

Race Two
- Laps: 21
Podium
First		(United Kingdom) Andy Priaulx	BMW Team UK
Second		(Italy) Nicola Larini	Chevrolet RML
Third		(Sweden) Rickard Rydell	SEAT Sport
Fastest Lap
Driver		(Sweden) Rickard Rydell	SEAT Sport
Time		1:36.268	

The 2008 FIA WTCC Race of France was the fourth round of the 2008 World Touring Car Championship season and the fourth running of the FIA WTCC Race of France. It was held on 1 June 2008 at the temporary Circuit de Pau street circuit in Pau, France. It was the headline event of the 2008 Pau Grand Prix. The first race was won by Augusto Farfus, whilst the second race was won by Andy Priaulx.

== Classification ==
=== Qualifying ===
Pos.	No.	Name	Team	Car	Class	Time
1	3	(Brazil) Augusto Farfus	BMW Team Germany	BMW 320si		1:21.960
2	12	(France) Yvan Muller	SEAT Sport	SEAT León TDI		1:21.980
3	9	(Spain) Jordi Gené	SEAT Sport	SEAT León TDI		1:22.276
4	11	(Italy) Gabriele Tarquini	SEAT Sport	SEAT León TDI		1:22.449
5	10	(Sweden) Rickard Rydell	SEAT Sport	SEAT León TDI		1:22.494
6	7	(United Kingdom) Robert Huff	Chevrolet RML	Chevrolet Lacetti		1:22.511
7	1	(United Kingdom) Andy Priaulx	BMW Team UK	BMW 320si		1:22.679
8	6	(Italy) Nicola Larini	Chevrolet RML	Chevrolet Lacetti		1:22.790
9	18	(Portugal) Tiago Monteiro	SEAT Sport	SEAT León TDI		1:22.826
10	2	(Germany) Jörg Müller	BMW Team Germany	BMW 320si		1:22.848
11	8	(Switzerland) Alain Menu	Chevrolet RML	Chevrolet Lacetti		1:23.046
12	4	(Italy) Alessandro Zanardi	BMW Team Italy-Spain	BMW 320si		1:23.048
13	20	(Netherlands) Tom Coronel	SUNRED Engineering	SEAT León TFSI		1:23.106
14	15	(United Kingdom) James Thompson	N.Technology	Honda Accord Euro R		1:23.209
15	5	(Spain) Félix Porteiro	BMW Team Italy-Spain	BMW 320si		1:23.255
16	32	(Spain) Oscar Nogués	SUNRED Engineering	SEAT León TFSI	Y	1:23.652
17	26	(Italy) Stefano D'Aste	Scuderia Proteam Motorsport	BMW 320si	Y	1:23.817
18	42	(Germany) Franz Engstler	Liqui Moly Team Engstler	BMW 320si	Y	1:24.273
19	23	(Belgium) Pierre-Yves Corthals	Exagon Engineering	SEAT León TFSI	Y	1:24.348
20	33	(France) Laurent Cazenave	Wiechers-Sport	BMW 320si	Y	1:24.410
21	31	(Spain) Sergio Hernández	Scuderia Proteam Motorsport	BMW 320si	Y	1:25.310
22	43	(Russia) Andrey Romanov	Liqui Moly Team Engstler	BMW 320si	Y	1:26.169
23	29	(Netherlands) Jaap van Lagen	Russian Bears Motorsport	Lada 110 2.0	Y	1:26.685
24	28	(Russia) Viktor Shapovalov	Russian Bears Motorsport	Lada 110 2.0	Y	1:28.812
25	8	(Turkey) Ibrahim Okyay	Borusan Otomotiv Motorsport	BMW 320si	Y	1:30.425

=== Race 1 ===
Pos.	No.	Name	Team	Class	Laps	Time / Retired	Grid
1	3	(Brazil) Augusto Farfus	BMW Team Germany		20		1
2	12	(France) Yvan Muller	SEAT Sport		20	+ 17.851 s	2
3	9	(Spain) Jordi Gené	SEAT Sport		20	+ 18.111 s	3
4	7	(United Kingdom) Robert Huff	Chevrolet RML		20	+ 19.139 s	6
5	11	(Italy) Gabriele Tarquini	SEAT Sport		20	+ 20.608 s	4
6	10	(Sweden) Rickard Rydell	SEAT Sport		20	+ 21.265 s	5
7	6	(Italy) Nicola Larini	Chevrolet RML		20	+ 22.110 s	8
8	1	(United Kingdom) Andy Priaulx	BMW Team UK		20	+ 22.478 s	7
9	2	(Germany) Jörg Müller	BMW Team Germany		20	+ 23.126 s	10
10	8	(Switzerland) Alain Menu	Chevrolet RML		20	+ 23.543 s	11
11	15	(United Kingdom) James Thompson	N.Technology		20	+ 24.144 s	14
12	4	(Italy) Alessandro Zanardi	BMW Team Italy-Spain		20	+ 25.012 s	12
13	18	(Portugal) Tiago Monteiro	SEAT Sport		20	+ 25.417 s	9
14	20	(Netherlands) Tom Coronel	SUNRED Engineering		20	+ 26.573 s	13
15	5	(Spain) Félix Porteiro	BMW Team Italy-Spain		20	+ 36.631 s	15
16	33	(France) Laurent Cazenave	Wiechers-Sport	Y	20	+ 37.412 s	20
17	31	(Spain) Sergio Hernández	Scuderia Proteam Motorsport	Y	20	+ 37.783 s	21
18	26	(Italy) Stefano D'Aste	Scuderia Proteam Motorsport	Y	20	+ 38.254 s	17
19	42	(Germany) Franz Engstler	Liqui Moly Team Engstler	Y	20	+ 38.834 s	18
20	43	(Russia) Andrey Romanov	Liqui Moly Team Engstler	Y	20	+ 1:03.206 s	22
21	29	(Netherlands) Jaap van Lagen	Russian Bears Motorsport	Y	20	+ 1:03.847 s	23
Ret	13	(Turkey) Ibrahim Okyay	Borusan Otomotiv Motorsport	Y	13	Retired	25
Ret	23	(Belgium) Pierre-Yves Corthals	Exagon Engineering	Y	0	Retired	19
Ret	32	(Spain) Oscar Nogués	SUNRED Engineering	Y	0	Retired	16
DNQ	28	(Russia) Viktor Shapovalov	Russian Bears Motorsport	Y		Did not qualify	
Fastest Lap: Augusto Farfus (BMW Team Germany) - 1:22.682

=== Race 2 ===
Pos.	No.	Name	Team	Class	Laps	Time / Retired	Grid
1	1	(United Kingdom) Andy Priaulx	BMW Team UK		21	36min 01.406sec	1
2	6	(Italy) Nicola Larini	Chevrolet RML		21	+ 4.528 s	2
3	10	(Sweden) Rickard Rydell	SEAT Sport		21	+ 5.000 s	3
4	11	(Italy) Gabriele Tarquini	SEAT Sport		21	+ 14.424 s	4
5	7	(United Kingdom) Robert Huff	Chevrolet RML		21	+ 18.324 s	5
6	3	(Brazil) Augusto Farfus	BMW Team Germany		21	+ 19.968 s	8
7	12	(France) Yvan Muller	SEAT Sport		21	+ 25.140 s	7
8	15	(United Kingdom) James Thompson	N.Technology		21	+ 28.203 s	11
9	20	(Netherlands) Tom Coronel	SUNRED Engineering		21	+ 39.471 s	14
10	18	(Portugal) Tiago Monteiro	SEAT Sport		21	+ 41.636 s	13
11	4	(Italy) Alessandro Zanardi	BMW Team Italy-Spain		21	+ 44.483 s	12
12	5	(Spain) Félix Porteiro	BMW Team Italy-Spain		21	+ 53.018 s	15
13	2	(Germany) Jörg Müller	BMW Team Germany		21	+ 55.823 s	9
14	26	(Italy) Stefano D'Aste	Scuderia Proteam Motorsport	Y	21	+ 1:07.324 s	18
15	42	(Germany) Franz Engstler	Liqui Moly Team Engstler	Y	21	+ 1:11.915 s	19
16	32	(Spain) Oscar Nogués	SUNRED Engineering	Y	21	+ 1:16.688 s	24
17	31	(Spain) Sergio Hernández	Scuderia Proteam Motorsport	Y	21	+ 1:20.459 s	17
18	29	(Netherlands) Jaap van Lagen	Russian Bears Motorsport	Y	21	+ 1:30.303 s	21
19	9	(Spain) Jordi Gené	SEAT Sport		20	+ 1 lap	6
20	43	(Russia) Andrey Romanov	Liqui Moly Team Engstler	Y	20	+ 1 lap	20
21	23	(Belgium) Pierre-Yves Corthals	Exagon Engineering	Y	19	+ 2 laps	23
Ret	33	(France) Laurent Cazenave	Wiechers-Sport	Y	13	Retired	16
Ret	8	(Switzerland) Alain Menu	Chevrolet RML		12	Retired	10
Ret	13	(Turkey) Ibrahim Okyay	Borusan Otomotiv Motorsport	Y	12	Retired	22
DNQ	28	(Russia) Viktor Shapovalov	Russian Bears Motorsport	Y		Did not qualify	
Fastest Lap: Rickard Rydell (SEAT Sport) - 1:36.268
