= 2009 World Touring Car Championship =

Motorsport season

Champions
- World Drivers' Champion: Gabriele Tarquini
- World Manufacturers' Champion: SEAT

Seasons
- ← 2008 2010 →

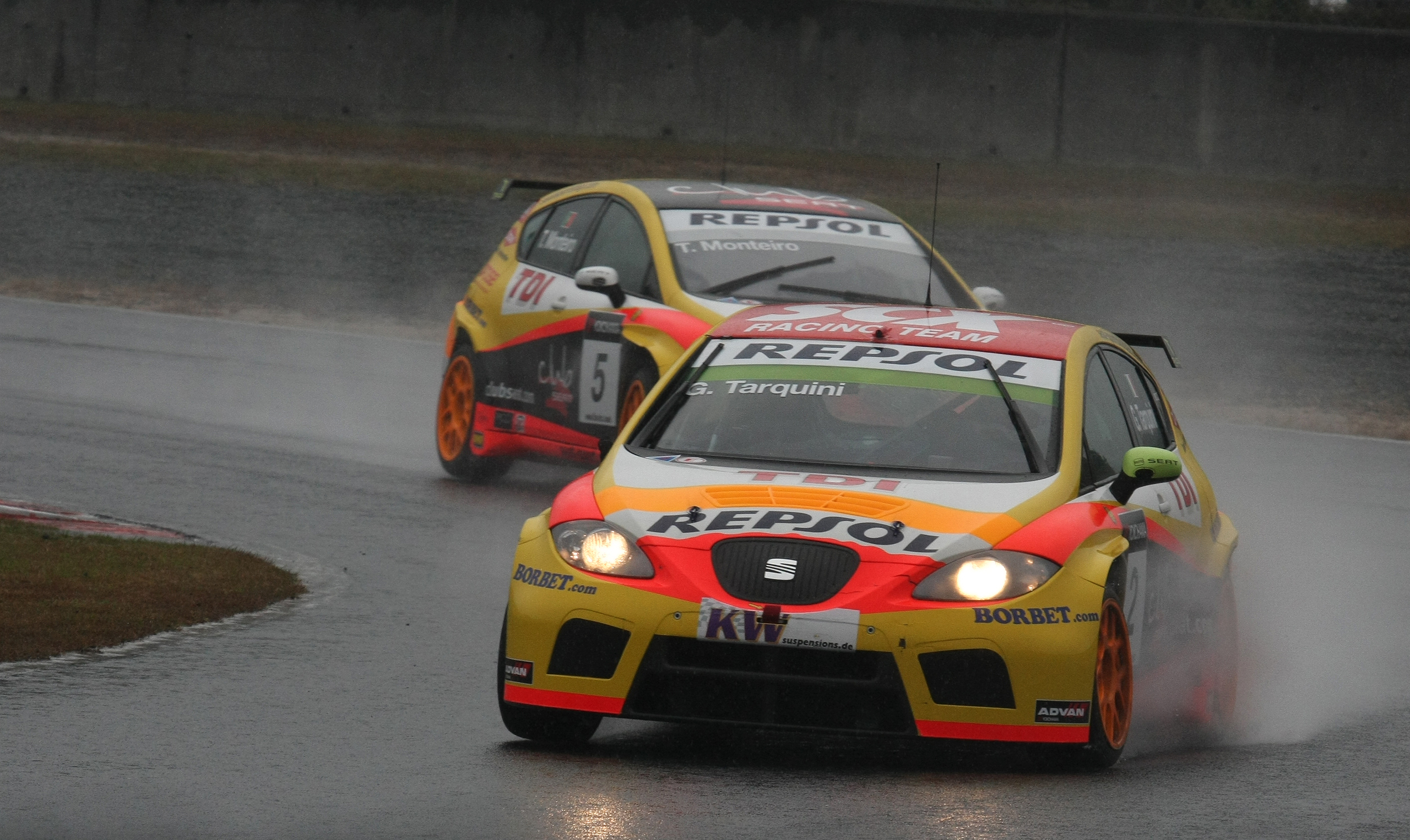
Gabriele Tarquini won the Drivers' Championship and SEAT won the Manufacturers' Championship.

The 2009 World Touring Car Championship season was the sixth FIA World Touring Car Championship season, the fifth since its 2005 return. It began on 8 March, and ended on 22 November, after twenty-four races. The championship, which was reserved for Super 2000 Cars and Diesel 2000 Cars, comprised two titles, the FIA World Touring Car Champion for Drivers and the FIA World Touring Car Champion for Manufacturers.

Italian Gabriele Tarquini won the Drivers' Championship by four points from SEAT Sport team-mate Yvan Muller, with BMW Team Germany's Augusto Farfus finishing third ten points behind Muller. The Manufacturers Championship was retained by SEAT beating BMW by just three points. Tom Coronel took the Independents' Trophy for SUNRED Engineering, which won the Teams' Trophy.

== Teams and drivers ==
The following teams and drivers contested the 2009 FIA World Touring Car Championship:

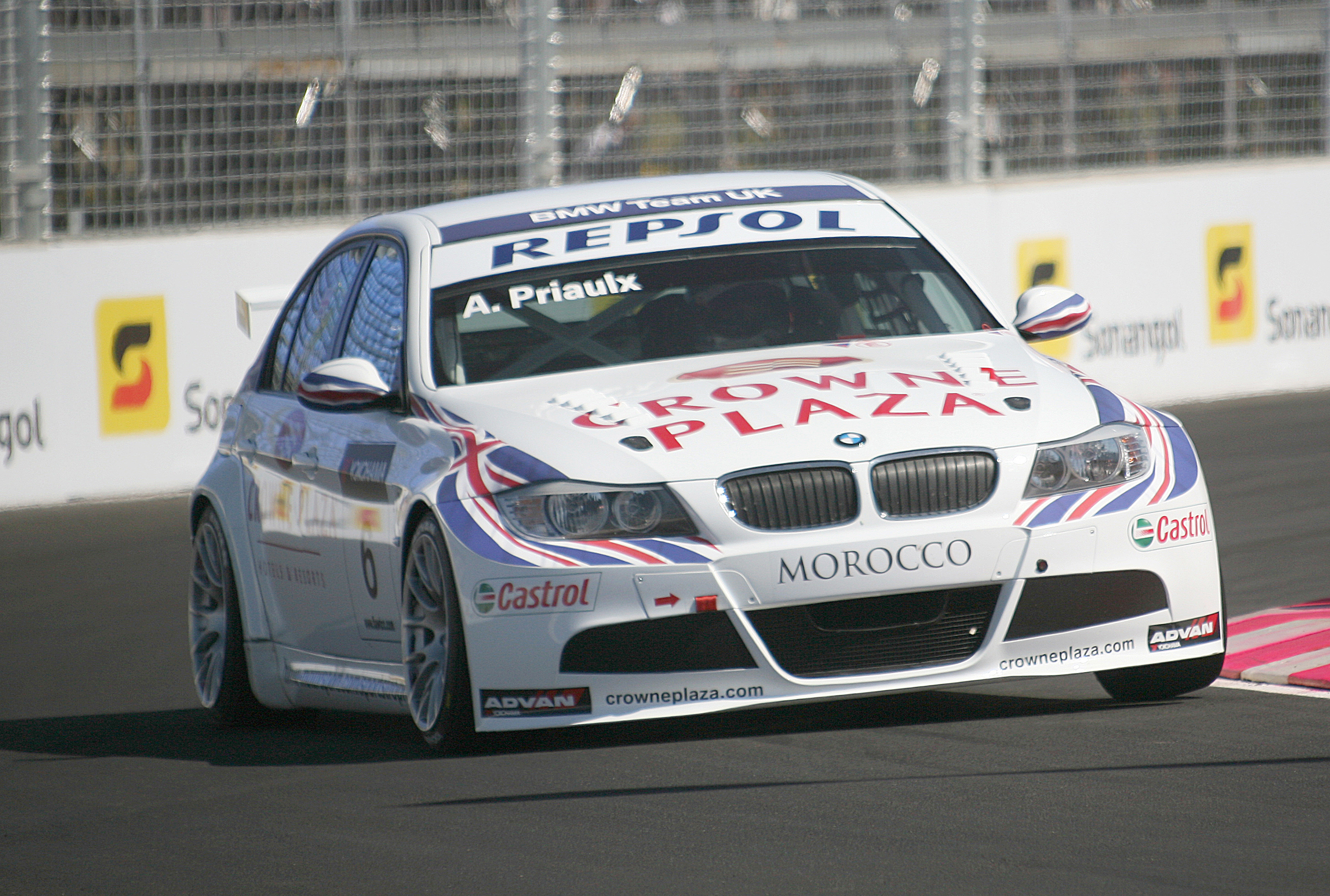
Former World Champion Andy Priaulx again drove for BMW Team UK in 2009.

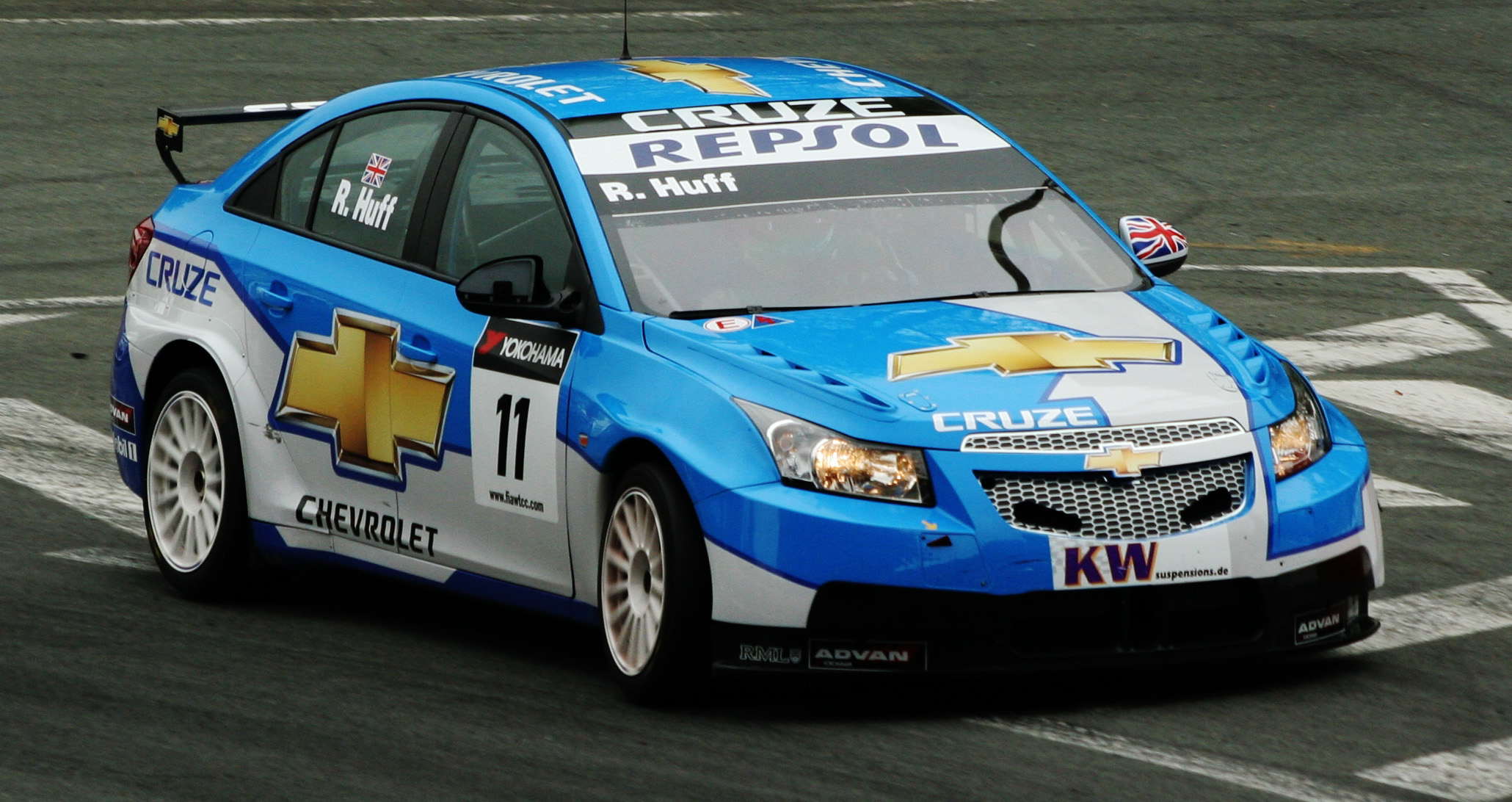
Chevrolet introduced their new Cruze model for the 2009 season.

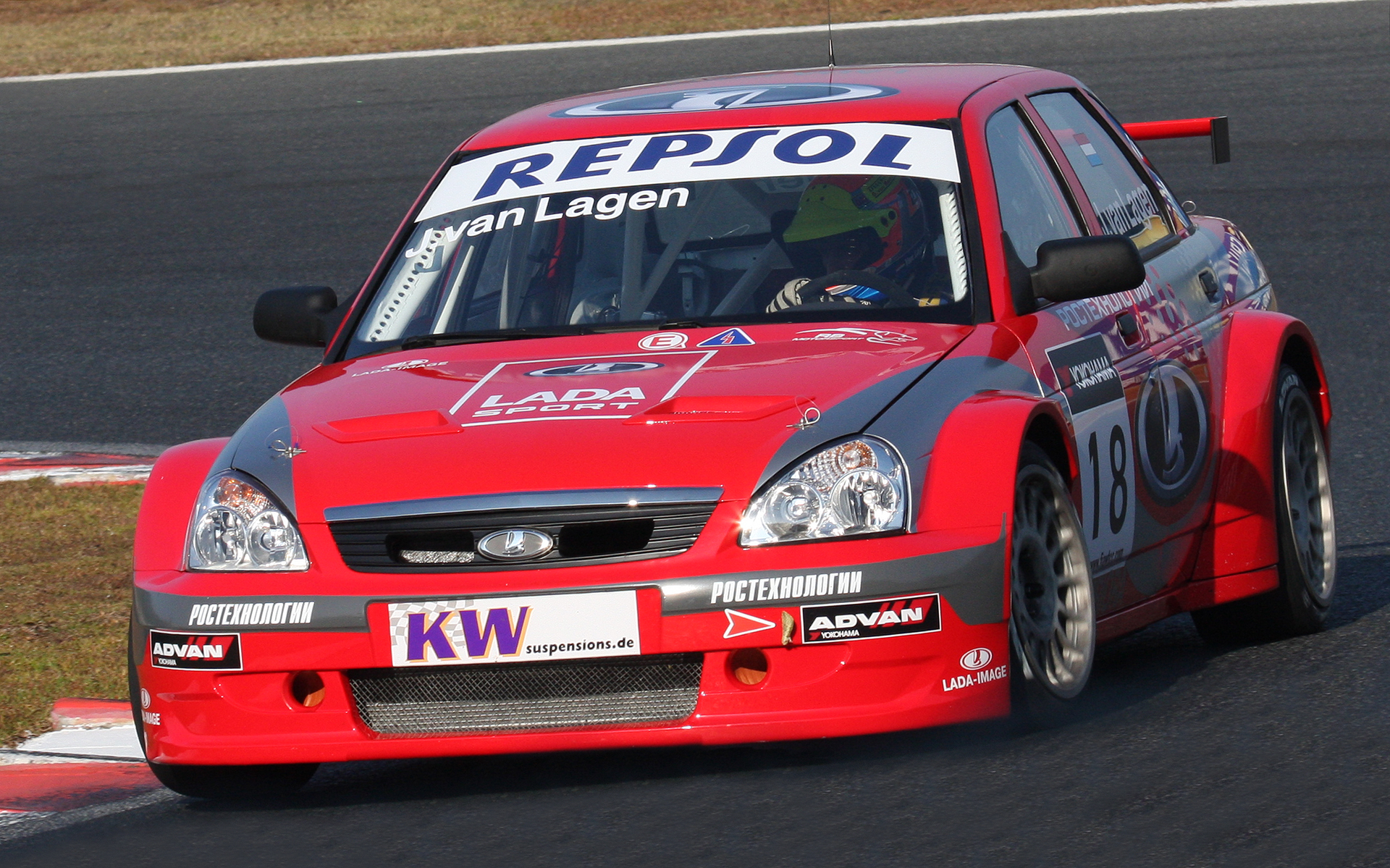
Lada debuted their new Priora during the 2009 season.

Team	Car	No.	Drivers	Events
Manufacturer Teams
(Spain) SEAT Sport	SEAT León 2.0 TDI	1	(France) Yvan Muller	All
(Spain) SEAT Sport	SEAT León 2.0 TDI	2	(Italy) Gabriele Tarquini	All
(Spain) SEAT Sport	SEAT León 2.0 TDI	3	(Sweden) Rickard Rydell	All
(Spain) SEAT Sport	SEAT León 2.0 TDI	4	(Spain) Jordi Gené	All
(Spain) SEAT Sport	SEAT León 2.0 TDI	5	(Portugal) Tiago Monteiro	All
(United Kingdom) BMW Team UK	BMW 320si	6	(United Kingdom) Andy Priaulx	All
BMW Team Germany	BMW 320si	7	(Germany) Jörg Müller	All
BMW Team Germany	BMW 320si	8	(Brazil) Augusto Farfus	All
BMW Team Italy-Spain	BMW 320si	9	(Italy) Alessandro Zanardi	All
BMW Team Italy-Spain	BMW 320si	10	(Spain) Sergio Hernández	All
(United Kingdom) Chevrolet RML	Chevrolet Cruze LT	11	(United Kingdom) Robert Huff	All
(United Kingdom) Chevrolet RML	Chevrolet Cruze LT	12	(Switzerland) Alain Menu	All
(United Kingdom) Chevrolet RML	Chevrolet Cruze LT	14	(Italy) Nicola Larini	All
(Russia) LADA Sport	LADA 110 2.0	18	(Netherlands) Jaap van Lagen	1–8
(Russia) LADA Sport	LADA Priora	18	(Netherlands) Jaap van Lagen	9–12
(Russia) LADA Sport	LADA 110 2.0	19	(Russia) Kirill Ladygin	1–8
(Russia) LADA Sport	LADA Priora	19	(Russia) Kirill Ladygin	9–12
(Russia) LADA Sport	LADA 110 2.0	20	(Russia) Viktor Shapovalov	1–6
(Russia) LADA Sport	LADA Priora	20	(Russia) Viktor Shapovalov	9
(Russia) LADA Sport	LADA Priora	36	(United Kingdom) James Thompson	7–8, 10–12
Yokohama Trophy
(Spain) SUNRED Engineering	SEAT León	21	(Netherlands) Tom Coronel	All
(Spain) SUNRED Engineering	SEAT León	22	(United Kingdom) Tom Boardman	1–2, 4–12
(Spain) SUNRED Engineering	SEAT León	29	(France) Éric Cayrolle	4
(Spain) SUNRED Engineering	SEAT León	32	(Netherlands) Tim Coronel	6
(Spain) SUNRED Engineering	SEAT León	35	(Spain) Diego Puyo	7
(Spain) SUNRED Engineering	SEAT León	37	(Hungary) Norbert Michelisz	8
(Spain) SUNRED Engineering	SEAT León	41	(France) Jean-Marie Clairet	9
(Spain) SUNRED Engineering	SEAT León	45	(Italy) Andrea Larini	10
(Spain) SUNRED Engineering	SEAT León	47	(Brazil) João Paulo Lima de Oliveira	11
(Spain) SUNRED Engineering	SEAT León	66	(Macau) André Couto	12
(Italy) Scuderia Proteam Motorsport	BMW 320si	23	(Spain) Félix Porteiro	All
(Italy) Scuderia Proteam Motorsport	BMW 320si	24	(Bulgaria) Georgi Tanev	1–3
(Italy) Scuderia Proteam Motorsport	BMW 320si	31	(Italy) Vito Postiglione	3, 5–6, 8
(Italy) Scuderia Proteam Motorsport	BMW 320si	46	(Italy) Fabio Fabiani	10
(Germany) Liqui Moly Team Engstler	BMW 320si	25	(Germany) Franz Engstler	All
(Germany) Liqui Moly Team Engstler	BMW 320si	26	(Denmark) Kristian Poulsen	All
(Germany) Liqui Moly Team Engstler	BMW 320si	38	(Germany) Philip Geipel	8–9
(Germany) Wiechers-Sport	BMW 320si	27	(Italy) Stefano D'Aste	All
(Germany) Wiechers-Sport	BMW 320si	33	(France) Laurent Cazenave	4
(Croatia) Čolak Racing Team Ingra	SEAT León	28	(Croatia) Marin Čolak	1–6, 9
(France) Exagon Engineering	SEAT León	30	(Morocco) Mehdi Bennani	3–5, 7, 10
(Denmark) Perfection Racing	Chevrolet Lacetti	42	(Denmark) Michel Nykjær	9
(Denmark) Team Bygma Jason Watt Racing	SEAT León	43	(Denmark) Jason Watt	9
Asian Wild Card Entries
(Germany) Liqui Moly Team Engstler	BMW 320si	48	(Japan) Masaki Kano	11
(Germany) Liqui Moly Team Engstler	BMW 320si	51	(Macau) Henry Ho	11–12
(Germany) Liqui Moly Team Engstler	BMW 320si	53	(Macau) Alex Liu	12
(Germany) Liqui Moly Team Engstler	BMW 320si	55	(Macau) Joseph Rosa Merszei	12
(Italy) Scuderia Proteam Motorsport	BMW 320si	49	(Japan) Nobuteru Taniguchi	11–12
(Germany) Wiechers-Sport	BMW 320si	50	(Japan) Seiji Ara	11
(Germany) Wiechers-Sport	BMW 320si	52	(Japan) Takayuki Aoki	12
China Dragon Racing	BMW 320si	67	(Macau) Lei Kit Meng	12
Guest Entries
(Sweden) Volvo Olsbergs Green Racing	Volvo C30	39	(Sweden) Robert Dahlgren	8
(Sweden) Volvo Olsbergs Green Racing	Volvo C30	40	(Norway) Tommy Rustad	8

=== Driver changes ===
Changed Teams

- Stefano D'Aste: Scuderia Proteam Motorsport → Wiechers-Sport
- Sergio Hernández: Scuderia Proteam Motorsport → BMW Team Italy-Spain
- Félix Porteiro: BMW Team Italy-Spain → Scuderia Proteam Motorsport
- Kristian Poulsen: Wiechers-Sport → Liqui Moly Team Engstler
- James Thompson: N-Technology → LADA Sport

Entering WTCC Including those who entered one-off rounds in 2008

- Mehdi Bennani: No full-time drive → Exagon Engineering
- Tom Boardman: SEAT León Eurocup → SUNRED Engineering
- Marin Čolak: SEAT León Eurocup → Čolak Racing Team Ingra
- Vito Postiglione: Italian GT Championship → Scuderia Proteam Motorsport

Leaving WTCC

- Pierre-Yves Corthals: Exagon Engineering → Belgian Touring Car Series
- Ibrahim Okyay: Borusan Otomotiv Motorsport → Unknown
- Andrey Romanov: Liqui Moly Team Engstler → ADAC Procar Series

== Calendar ==
The first provisional calendar was released in October 2008.

Marrakech hosted a round on a new temporary street circuit in the heart of the city on 3 May. and Porto returned to the championship.

On 5 November 2008, FIA released a new provisional calendar, and announced the date of the Race of Germany in Oschersleben moved from 30 August to 6 September (due to clash with the date of the Belgian Formula One Grand Prix), and the date of the Race of Japan in Okayama moved from 25 October to 1 November. The Race of Italy was originally scheduled to be run in Monza but it was changed to Imola, and the date of the event in Italy was also changed (from 4 October to 20 September).

Round		Race Name	Track	Date
1	R1	HSBC Race of Brazil	(Brazil) Autódromo Internacional de Curitiba	8 March
1	R2	HSBC Race of Brazil	(Brazil) Autódromo Internacional de Curitiba	8 March
2	R3	HSBC Race of Mexico	(Mexico) Autódromo Miguel E. Abed	22 March
2	R4	HSBC Race of Mexico	(Mexico) Autódromo Miguel E. Abed	22 March
3	R5	Race of Morocco	(Morocco) Marrakech Street Circuit	3 May
3	R6	Race of Morocco	(Morocco) Marrakech Street Circuit	3 May
4	R7	Ville de Pau Race of France	(France) Circuit de Pau Ville	17 May
4	R8	Ville de Pau Race of France	(France) Circuit de Pau Ville	17 May
5	R9	Race of Spain	(Spain) Circuit Ricardo Tormo	31 May
5	R10	Race of Spain	(Spain) Circuit Ricardo Tormo	31 May
6	R11	Mariott Race of the Czech Republic	(Czech Republic) Masaryk Circuit	21 June
6	R12	Mariott Race of the Czech Republic	(Czech Republic) Masaryk Circuit	21 June
7	R13	Race of Portugal	(Portugal) Circuito da Boavista	5 July
7	R14	Race of Portugal	(Portugal) Circuito da Boavista	5 July
8	R15	Mariott Race of UK	(United Kingdom) Brands Hatch	19 July
8	R16	Mariott Race of UK	(United Kingdom) Brands Hatch	19 July
9	R17	Atari Race of Germany	(Germany) Motorsport Arena Oschersleben	6 September
9	R18	Atari Race of Germany	(Germany) Motorsport Arena Oschersleben	6 September
10	R19	Stihl Race of Italy	(Italy) Autodromo Enzo e Dino Ferrari	20 September
10	R20	Stihl Race of Italy	(Italy) Autodromo Enzo e Dino Ferrari	20 September
11	R21	Kenwood Race of Japan	(Japan) Okayama International Circuit	1 November
11	R22	Kenwood Race of Japan	(Japan) Okayama International Circuit	1 November
12	R23	Mariott Race of Macau	(Macau) Guia Circuit	22 November
12	R24	Mariott Race of Macau	(Macau) Guia Circuit	22 November

== Results and standings ==
=== Races ===
Race	Race Name	Pole Position	Fastest lap	Winning driver	Winning team	Winning independent	Report
1	Race of Brazil	(France) Yvan Muller	(France) Yvan Muller	(France) Yvan Muller	(Spain) SEAT Sport	(Spain) Félix Porteiro	Report
2	Race of Brazil		(Switzerland) Alain Menu	(Italy) Gabriele Tarquini	(Spain) SEAT Sport	(Spain) Félix Porteiro	Report
3	Race of Mexico	(Brazil) Augusto Farfus	(United Kingdom) Andy Priaulx	(Sweden) Rickard Rydell	(Spain) SEAT Sport	(Spain) Félix Porteiro	Report
4	Race of Mexico		(Germany) Jörg Müller	(France) Yvan Muller	(Spain) SEAT Sport	(Spain) Félix Porteiro	Report
5	Race of Morocco	(United Kingdom) Robert Huff	(United Kingdom) Robert Huff	(United Kingdom) Robert Huff	(United States) Chevrolet	(Morocco) Mehdi Bennani	Report
6	Race of Morocco		(Switzerland) Alain Menu	(Italy) Nicola Larini	(United States) Chevrolet	(Germany) Franz Engstler	Report
7	Race of France	(Brazil) Augusto Farfus	(Spain) Sergio Hernández	(United Kingdom) Robert Huff	(United States) Chevrolet	(Germany) Franz Engstler	Report
8	Race of France		(Germany) Jörg Müller	(Switzerland) Alain Menu	(United States) Chevrolet	(France) Éric Cayrolle	Report
9	Race of Spain	(Italy) Gabriele Tarquini	(France) Yvan Muller	(France) Yvan Muller	(Spain) SEAT Sport	(Netherlands) Tom Coronel	Report
10	Race of Spain		(Brazil) Augusto Farfus	(Brazil) Augusto Farfus	BMW Team Germany	(Italy) Stefano D'Aste	Report
11	Race of the Czech Republic	(Brazil) Augusto Farfus	(United Kingdom) Andy Priaulx	(Italy) Alessandro Zanardi	BMW Team Italy-Spain	(Spain) Félix Porteiro	Report
12	Race of the Czech Republic		(Spain) Sergio Hernández	(Spain) Sergio Hernández	BMW Team Italy-Spain	(Spain) Félix Porteiro	Report
13	Race of Portugal	(Italy) Gabriele Tarquini	(Italy) Gabriele Tarquini	(Italy) Gabriele Tarquini	(Spain) SEAT Sport	(Italy) Stefano D'Aste	Report
14	Race of Portugal		(Brazil) Augusto Farfus	(Brazil) Augusto Farfus	BMW Team Germany	(Italy) Stefano D'Aste	Report
15	(United Kingdom) Race of UK	(Switzerland) Alain Menu	(Switzerland) Alain Menu	(Switzerland) Alain Menu	(United States) Chevrolet	(Italy) Stefano D'Aste	Report
16	(United Kingdom) Race of UK		(Germany) Jörg Müller	(Brazil) Augusto Farfus	BMW Team Germany	(United Kingdom) Tom Boardman	Report
17	Race of Germany	(Italy) Gabriele Tarquini	(United Kingdom) Andy Priaulx	(United Kingdom) Andy Priaulx	(United Kingdom) BMW Team UK	(Netherlands) Tom Coronel	Report
18	Race of Germany		(United Kingdom) Andy Priaulx	(Brazil) Augusto Farfus	BMW Team Germany	(Netherlands) Tom Coronel	Report
19	Race of Italy	(Italy) Gabriele Tarquini	(Italy) Gabriele Tarquini	(Italy) Gabriele Tarquini	(Spain) SEAT Sport	(Netherlands) Tom Coronel	Report
20	Race of Italy		(Sweden) Rickard Rydell	(France) Yvan Muller	(Spain) SEAT Sport	(Italy) Stefano D'Aste	Report
21	Race of Japan	(Italy) Gabriele Tarquini	(Sweden) Rickard Rydell	(United Kingdom) Andy Priaulx	(United Kingdom) BMW Team UK	(Netherlands) Tom Coronel	Report
22	Race of Japan		(United Kingdom) Robert Huff	(Brazil) Augusto Farfus	BMW Team Germany	(Italy) Stefano D'Aste	Report
23	Guia Race of Macau	(United Kingdom) Robert Huff	(Portugal) Tiago Monteiro	(United Kingdom) Robert Huff	(United States) Chevrolet	(Netherlands) Tom Coronel	Report
24	Guia Race of Macau		(Germany) Jörg Müller	(Brazil) Augusto Farfus	BMW Team Germany	(Spain) Félix Porteiro	Report

== Championship standings ==
Points system
**1st**	**2nd**	**3rd**	**4th**	**5th**	**6th**	**7th**	**8th**
10	8	6	5	4	3	2	1

=== Drivers' Championship ===
Pos	Driver	BRA (Brazil)		MEX (Mexico)		MAR (Morocco)		FRA (France)		ESP (Spain)		CZE (Czech Republic)		POR (Portugal)		UK (United Kingdom)		GER (Germany)		ITA (Italy)		JPN (Japan)		MAC (Macau)		Pts
1	(Italy) Gabriele Tarquini	4	1	6	8	2	5	12	6	**3**	3	3	5	**1**	Ret	4	3	**2**	3	**1**	2	**5**	7	2	5	**127**
2	(France) Yvan Muller	**1**	4	4	1	4	2	11	7	1	7	8	**2**	3	2	Ret	7	NC	7	2	1	4	3	5	3	**123**
3	(Brazil) Augusto Farfus	5	6	**2**	4	12	6	**2**	2	4	1	**Ret**	Ret	8	**1**	8	**1**	5	1	NC	8	8	**1**	8	**1**	**113**
4	(United Kingdom) Andy Priaulx	7	9	3	2	10	15†	4	4	5	4	NC	8	9	7	3	5	1	2	15	9	1	2	NC	13	**84**
5	(United Kingdom) Robert Huff	Ret	13	NC	14	**1**	3	1	3	22	22	Ret	12	2	6	2	6	Ret	9	3	17	3	6	**1**	8	**80**
6	(Germany) Jörg Müller	NC	5	5	13	8	**4**	3	18	6	2	2	7	11	8	6	2	Ret	4	NC	15	2	16	7	2	**76**
7	(Sweden) Rickard Rydell	3	2	1	3	Ret	DNS	13	Ret	13	14	4	6	7	3	5	4	3	11	NC	7	25	8	11	10	**64**
8	(Spain) Jordi Gené	2	3	7	7	3	Ret	16	12	Ret	11	Ret	11	6	4	13	16	NC	Ret	NC	5	6	9	3	6	**48**
9	(Portugal) Tiago Monteiro	16	12	11	Ret	5	DSQ	14	11	2	8	6	3	4	5	7	8	19	12	Ret	23†	7	Ret	6	4	**44**
10	(Switzerland) Alain Menu	Ret	11	Ret	12	7	16	7	**1**	15	12	Ret	22	NC	18†	**1**	18	18	10	8	**3**	9	4	4	21	**41**
11	(Spain) Sergio Hernández	6	10	9	5	14	Ret	5	Ret	8	**6**	5	1	Ret	DNS	16	9	8	5	7	11	Ret	12	10	11	**36**
12	(Italy) Alessandro Zanardi	10	14	13	6	Ret	DNS	NC	5	12	5	1	Ret	12	10	12	12	17	Ret	4	4	15	17	9	9	**31**
13	(Italy) Nicola Larini	15	15	8	**10**	6	1	NC	9	11	13	Ret	13	5	Ret	22†	17	15	6	Ret	16	12	5	12	7	**27**
14	(Netherlands) Tom Coronel	9	8	15	15	21	8	8	19†	7	10	9	9	13	12	10	11	4	8	5	14	10	13	13	Ret	**15**
15	(Spain) Félix Porteiro	8	**7**	10	9	13	10	DSQ	17†	10	15	7	4	14	13	14	15	Ret	15	9	12	14	11	14	12	**10**
16	(Germany) Franz Engstler	12	16	14	11	11	7	6	Ret	16	16	11	14	20	11	NC	19	7	**Ret**	11	13	Ret	15	16	14	**7**
17	(United Kingdom) James Thompson													18	15	18	22			6	6	11	Ret	DNS	DNS	**6**
18	(Italy) Stefano D'Aste	Ret	20	12	16	16	13†	Ret	DNS	9	9	17	15	10	9	9	13	6	16	12	10	24†	10	DNS	DNS	**3**
19	(France) Éric Cayrolle							10	8																	**1**
–	(United Kingdom) Tom Boardman	11	19	16	21			9	Ret	17	19	13	19	15	Ret	11	10	9	13	10	18	18	14	15	Ret	**0**
–	(Morocco) Mehdi Bennani					9	9	18	Ret	14	23			DSQ	Ret					13	Ret					**0**
–	(Italy) Vito Postiglione					18	Ret			19	17	10	10			21	23									**0**
–	(Denmark) Kristian Poulsen	20†	18	Ret	Ret	Ret	Ret	15	10	Ret	20	Ret	21	17	16	20	Ret	12	22	16	19	19	Ret	17	Ret	**0**
–	(Netherlands) Jaap van Lagen	17	17	17	17	20	14	Ret	13	21†	Ret	14	18	Ret	DNS	Ret	21	10	20	Ret	DNS	13	Ret	23†	DNS	**0**
–	(Croatia) Marin Čolak	19†	DNS	Ret	22†	15	12	19	16	18	18	Ret	DNS					11	21							**0**
–	(Russia) Kirill Ladygin	14	22	18	20	17	11	Ret	Ret	Ret	24	15	17	19	17†	19	24	16	23†	14	20	16	DNS	DNS	DNS	**0**
–	(Netherlands) Tim Coronel											12	16													**0**
–	(Germany) Philip Geipel															17	20	13	14							**0**
–	(Russia) Viktor Shapovalov	13	23	19†	19	22†	17†	17	15	20	21	16	20					Ret	24							**0**
–	(Spain) Diego Puyo													16	14											**0**
–	(France) Jean-Marie Clairet																	14	17							**0**
–	(France) Laurent Cazenave							Ret	14																	**0**
–	(Japan) Nobuteru Taniguchi																					20	Ret	18	15	**0**
–	(Japan) Takayuki Aoki																							19	16	**0**
–	(Japan) Seiji Ara																					17	18			**0**
–	(Macau) Henry Ho																					22	Ret	20	17	**0**
–	(Italy) Fabio Fabiani																			17	22					**0**
–	(Bulgaria) Georgi Tanev	18	21	Ret	18	19	Ret																			**0**
–	(Macau) André Couto																							25	18	**0**
–	(Denmark) Michel Nykjær																	NC	18							**0**
–	(Macau) Lei Kit Meng																							21	19	**0**
–	(Brazil) João Paulo de Oliveira																					23	19			**0**
–	(Denmark) Jason Watt																	Ret	19							**0**
–	(Japan) Masaki Kano																					21	20			**0**
–	(Macau) Joseph Rosa Merszei																							22	20	**0**
–	(Italy) Andrea Larini																			DSQ	21					**0**
–	(Macau) Alex Liu																							24†	DNS	**0**
–	(Hungary) Norbert Michelisz															Ret	NC									**0**
guest drivers ineligible for points
–	(Sweden) Robert Dahlgren															15	14									*
–	(Norway) Tommy Rustad															Ret	Ret									*
Pos	Driver	BRA (Brazil)		MEX (Mexico)		MAR (Morocco)		FRA (France)		ESP (Spain)		CZE (Czech Republic)		POR (Portugal)		UK (United Kingdom)		GER (Germany)		ITA (Italy)		JPN (Japan)		MAC (Macau)		Pts

Colour	Result
Gold	Winner
Silver	Second place
Bronze	Third place
Green	Points classification
Blue	Non-points classification
Blue	Non-classified finish (NC)
Purple	Retired, not classified (Ret)
Red	Did not qualify (DNQ)
Red	Did not pre-qualify (DNPQ)
Black	Disqualified (DSQ)
White	Did not start (DNS)
White	Withdrew (WD)
White	Race cancelled (C)
Blank	Did not practice (DNP)
Blank	Did not arrive (DNA)
Blank	Excluded (EX)

**Bold** – Pole
Italics – Fastest Lap

† — Drivers did not finish the race, but were classified as they completed over 90% of the race distance.

Drivers' Championship points were awarded on a 10-8-6-5-4-3-2-1 basis to the first eight finishers in each of the twenty four races. All results obtained were taken into account.

=== Manufacturers' Championship ===
Pos	Manufacturer	BRA (Brazil)		MEX (Mexico)		MAR (Morocco)		FRA (France)		ESP (Spain)		CZE (Czech Republic)		POR (Portugal)		UK (United Kingdom)		GER (Germany)		ITA (Italy)		JPN (Japan)		MAC (Macau)		Pts
1	(Spain) SEAT	1	1	1	1	2	2	11	6	1	3	3	2	1	2	4	3	2	3	1	1	4	3	2	3	314
1	(Spain) SEAT	2	2	4	3	3	5	12	7	2	7	4	3	3	3	5	4	3	7	2	2	5	7	3	4	314
2	(Germany) BMW	5	5	2	2	8	4	2	2	4	1	1	1	8	1	3	1	1	1	4	4	1	1	7	1	311
2	(Germany) BMW	6	6	3	4	10	6	3	4	5	2	2	7	9	7	6	2	5	2	7	8	2	2	8	2	311
3	(United States) Chevrolet	15	11	8	10	1	1	1	1	11	12	Ret	12	2	6	1	6	15	5	3	3	3	4	1	7	215
3	(United States) Chevrolet	Ret	13	NC	12	6	3	7	3	15	13	Ret	13	5	18†	2	17	18	9	8	16	9	5	4	8	215
4	(Russia) Lada	13	17	17	17	17	11	16	13	20	21	14	17	18	15	18	21	10	20	6	6	11	Ret	23†	DNS	83
4	(Russia) Lada	14	22	18	19	20	14	Ret	15	21†	24	15	18	19	17†	19	22	16	23†	14	20	13	Ret	DNS	DNS	83
Pos	Manufacturer	BRA (Brazil)		MEX (Mexico)		MAR (Morocco)		FRA (France)		ESP (Spain)		CZE (Czech Republic)		POR (Portugal)		UK (United Kingdom)		GER (Germany)		ITA (Italy)		JPN (Japan)		MAC (Macau)		Pts

Manufacturers' Championship points were awarded on a 10-8-6-5-4-3-2-1 basis to the first eight finishers in each of the twenty four races. All results obtained by the best two classified cars per manufacturer were taken into account. All other cars from the same manufacturer were considered to be invisible in terms of points scoring.

=== Yokohama Independents' Trophy ===
Pos	Driver	BRA (Brazil)		MEX (Mexico)		MAR (Morocco)		FRA (France)		ESP (Spain)		CZE (Czech Republic)		POR (Portugal)		UK (United Kingdom)		GER (Germany)		ITA (Italy)		JPN (Japan)		MAC (Macau)		Pts
1	(Netherlands) Tom Coronel	9	8	15	15	21	8	8	19†	**7**	10	9	9	**13**	12	10	11	4	8	5	**14**	**10**	**13**	**13**	**Ret**	233
2	(Spain) Félix Porteiro	**8**	**7**	**10**	**9**	13	10	DSQ	17†	10	15	**7**	**4**	14	13	14	15	Ret	15	9	12	14	11	14	12	220
3	(Germany) Franz Engstler	12	16	14	11	**11**	7	**6**	**Ret**	16	16	11	14	20	11	NC	19	7	**Ret**	11	13	Ret	15	16	14	156
4	(Italy) Stefano D'Aste	Ret	20	12	16	16	13†	Ret	DNS	9	9	17	15	10	**9**	9	**13**	6	16	**12**	9	24†	10	DNS	DNS	137
5	(United Kingdom) Tom Boardman	11	19	16	21			9	Ret	17	19	13	19	15	Ret	11	10	9	13	10	18	18	14	15	Ret	99
6	(Denmark) Kristian Poulsen	20†	18	Ret	Ret	Ret	Ret	15	10	Ret	20	Ret	21	17	16	20	Ret	12	22	16	19	19	Ret	17	Ret	50
7	(Croatia) Marin Čolak	19†	DNS	Ret	22†	15	12	19	16	18	18	Ret	DNS					**11**	21							31
8	(Morocco) Mehdi Bennani					9	**9**	18	Ret	14	23			NC	Ret					13	Ret					30
9	(Italy) Vito Postiglione					18	Ret			19	17	10	10			21	23									24
10	(Japan) Nobuteru Taniguchi																					20	Ret	18	15	21
11	(France) Éric Cayrolle							10	8																	18
12	(Germany) Philip Geipel															17	20	13	14							15
13	(Japan) Takayuki Aoki																							19	16	14
14	(Bulgaria) Georgi Tanev	18	21	Ret	18	19	Ret																			12
15	(Macau) Henry Ho																					22	Ret	20	19	11
16	(Japan) Seiji Ara																					17	18			9
17	(Spain) Diego Puyo													16	14											8
18	(Netherlands) Tim Coronel											12	16													7
19	(France) Laurent Cazenave							Ret	14																	6
20	(Macau) André Couto																							25	17	6
21	(France) Jean-Marie Clairet																	14	17							4
22	(Brazil) João Paulo de Oliveira																					23	19			4
23	(Macau) Lei Kit Meng																							21	18	4
24	(Japan) Masaki Kano																					21	20			3
25	(Denmark) Michel Nykjær																	NC	18							2
26	(Macau) Joseph Rosa Merszei																							22	20	2
27	(Italy) Andrea Larini																			Ret	21					2
28	(Italy) Fabio Fabiani																			17	22					2
29	(Hungary) Norbert Michelisz															**Ret**	NC									2
30	(Denmark) Jason Watt																	Ret	19							1
–	(Macau) Alex Liu																							24†	DNS	0
Pos	Driver	BRA (Brazil)		MEX (Mexico)		MAR (Morocco)		FRA (France)		ESP (Spain)		CZE (Czech Republic)		POR (Portugal)		UK (United Kingdom)		GER (Germany)		ITA (Italy)		JPN (Japan)		MAC (Macau)		Pts

- The Yokohama Independents' Trophy used a similar points system to that used for the Drivers’ Championship, however bonus points were also awarded at each event for race one pole position and for the fastest race lap, unlike the Drivers' championship. Three bonus points per position were awarded if an independent driver finished in the overall top eight, e.g. if a driver finished sixth overall, he or she received nine bonus points. Double points were awarded at the final event at Macau.

=== Yokohama Teams' Trophy ===
Pos	Team	BRA (Brazil)		MEX (Mexico)		MAR (Morocco)		FRA (France)		ESP (Spain)		CZE (Czech Republic)		POR (Portugal)		UK (United Kingdom)		GER (Germany)		ITA (Italy)		JPN (Japan)		MAC (Macau)		Pts
1	(Spain) SUNRED Engineering	9	8	15	15	21	8	8	8	7	10	9	9	13	12	10	10	4	8	5	14	10	13	13	17	304
1	(Spain) SUNRED Engineering	11	19	16	21			9	19†	17	19	12	16	15	14	11	11	9	13	10	18	18	14	15	Ret	304
2	(Italy) Scuderia Proteam Motorsport	8	7	10	9	13	10	DSQ	17†	10	15	7	4	14	13	14	15	Ret	15	9	12	14	11	14	12	239
2	(Italy) Scuderia Proteam Motorsport	18	21	Ret	18	18	Ret			19	17	10	10			21	23			17	22	20	Ret	18	15	239
3	(Germany) Liqui Moly Team Engstler	12	16	14	11	11	7	6	10	16	16	11	14	17	11	17	19	7	14	11	13	19	15	16	14	212
3	(Germany) Liqui Moly Team Engstler	20†	18	Ret	Ret	Ret	Ret	15	Ret	Ret	20	Ret	21	20	16	20	20	12	22	16	19	21	20	17	19	212
4	(Germany) Wiechers-Sport	Ret	20	12	16	16	13†	Ret	14	9	9	17	15	10	9	9	13	6	16	12	9	17	10	19	16	150
4	(Germany) Wiechers-Sport							Ret	DNS													24†	18	DNS	DNS	150
5	(Croatia) Čolak Racing Team Ingra	19†	DNS	Ret	22†	15	12	19	16	18	18	Ret	DNS					11	21							32
6	(France) Exagon Engineering					9	9	18	Ret	14	23			NC	Ret					13	Ret					28
7	China Dragon Racing																							21	18	6
8	(Denmark) Perfection Racing																	NC	18							3
9	(Denmark) Team Bygma Jason Watt Racing																	Ret	19							2
Pos	Team	BRA (Brazil)		MEX (Mexico)		MAR (Morocco)		FRA (France)		ESP (Spain)		CZE (Czech Republic)		POR (Portugal)		UK (United Kingdom)		GER (Germany)		ITA (Italy)		JPN (Japan)		MAC (Macau)		Pts

All the teams taking part in any of the rounds of the 2009 FIA World Touring Car Championship were eligible to score points for the Yokohama Teams' Trophy. Points were awarded to the two best classified cars of each team, providing they were driven by Independent drivers. All other cars of that same team were considered invisible as far as scoring points was concerned.
