= Takayuki Aoki =

Japanese auto racing driver (born 1972)

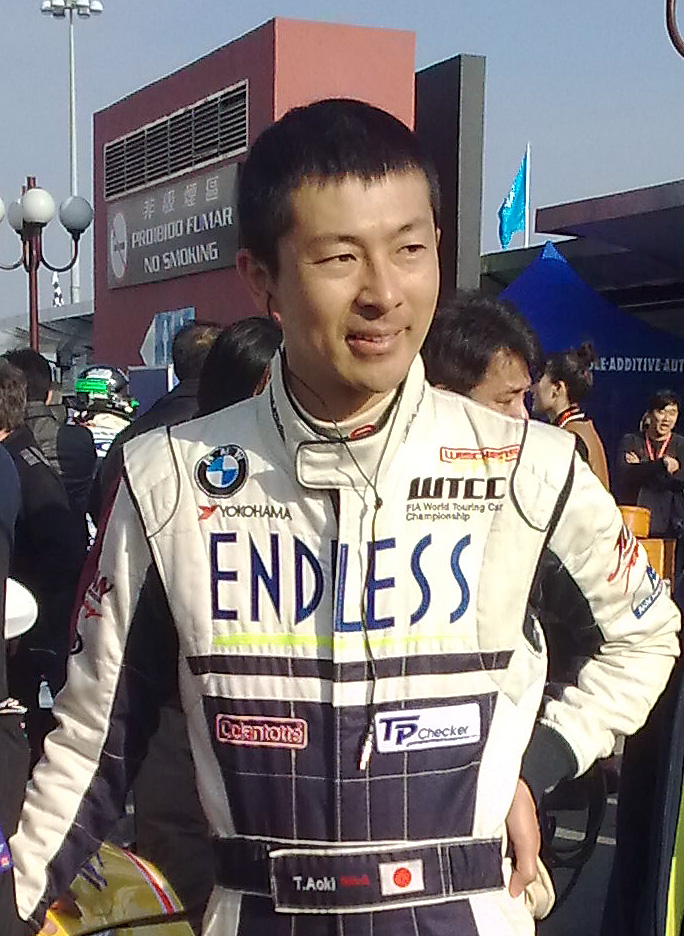
- Aoki in 2009
- Nationality: (Japan) Japanese
- Born: 26 October 1972 (age 54) Yasu, Shiga, Japan

Super GT career
- Debut season: 1998
- Categorisation: FIA Silver
- Starts: 194
- Wins: 12
- Podiums: 25
- Poles: 5
- Best finish: 1st in 2001

Previous series
- ?–2024 2015– 2008–09: Superrace Championship; TGR GR86/BRZ Cup; World Touring Car Championship

Championship titles
- 2014 2002, 2003, 2007 2001: Super Taikyū - ST-X; Super Taikyū - Class 1 All-Japan Grand Touring Car Championship - GT300

Takayuki Aoki (青木孝行, Aoki Takayuki; born 26 October 1972) is a Japanese racing driver who currently competes in the GT World Challenge Asia for Team 5ZIGEN.

Aoki is one of the most experienced competitors in the history of Super GT and its predecessor, the All-Japan Grand Touring Car Championship (JGTC), having competed in the series' GT300 class between 1998 and 2025. Partnering Nobuyuki Ōyagi, Aoki won the GT300 drivers' championship title in 2001.

== Career ==
=== JGTC and Super GT ===
Aoki competed in the GT300 class of the Japanese GT Championship between 1998 and 2004, winning the class in 2001 in a Nissan Silvia. JGTC became Super GT in 2005 and Aoki was continued to compete in the GT300 class in a variety of cars.

=== World Touring Car Championship ===
Aoki joined WTCC team Wiechers-Sport for the final three rounds of the 2008 season, in Italy, Japan, and Macau. He would return to Wiechers for the season-ending 2009 FIA WTCC Race of Macau. He scored four points in race 1 and ten points in race 2 to finish 13th in the Yokohama Independents' Trophy.
