= Diesel 2000 =

FIA circuit racing classification

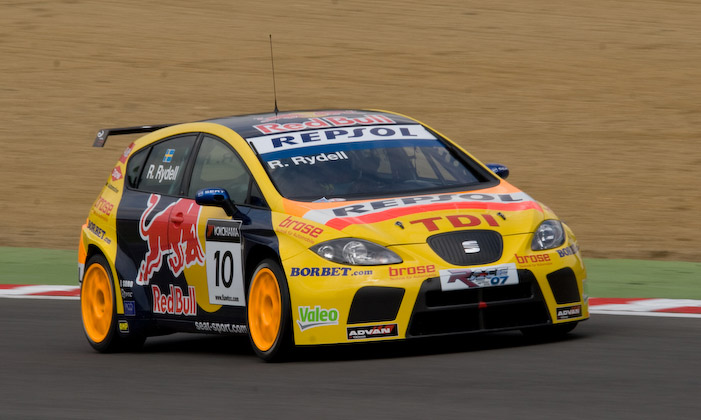
A Diesel 2000 SEAT León TDI competing in the 2008 World Touring Car Championship.

Diesel 2000 is an FIA circuit racing classification for modified production based touring cars using turbodiesel engines.

Like its counterpart, Super 2000, the category is open to large-scale series production touring cars modified by a kit. Cars must have at least four seats and at least 2500 fully identical units must be produced within 12 consecutive months to allow homologation. However, unlike Super 2000, Diesel 2000 allows only 4-cylinder turbocharged diesel engines with a maximum capacity of 2000cc.

The category was introduced to the European Touring Car Championship for 2004 to allow turbodiesel cars to compete alongside the existing petrol engined Super 2000 vehicles. When the European Championship was upgraded to become the World Touring Car Championship in 2005, both Diesel 2000 and Super 2000 cars were eligible to compete for the new title.

Spanish manufacturer SEAT has won the manufacturers award of the World Championship in both 2008 and 2009 with their Diesel 2000 León TDI model. Factory SEAT drivers Yvan Muller and Gabriele Tarquini have won the drivers titles with the same model in these two years respectively.

== See also ==
- Super 2000
