= 2008 World Touring Car Championship =

Motorsport contest

Champions
- World Drivers' Champion: Yvan Muller
- World Manufacturers' Champion: SEAT

Seasons
- ← 2007 2009 →

The 2008 World Touring Car Championship was a motor racing competition for Super 2000 Cars and Diesel 2000 Cars. Organised by the FIA, it comprised the FIA World Touring Car Championship for Drivers and the FIA World Touring Car Championship for Manufacturers. The championship began on 2 March, and ended on 16 November, after twenty-four races. It was the fifth World Touring Car Championship and the fourth since its 2005 return.

Frenchman Yvan Muller won the Drivers title by 26 points from SEAT team-mate Gabriele Tarquini, with Chevrolet's Robert Huff finishing third just a point behind Tarquini. The Manufacturers Championship was awarded to SEAT.

== Teams and drivers ==
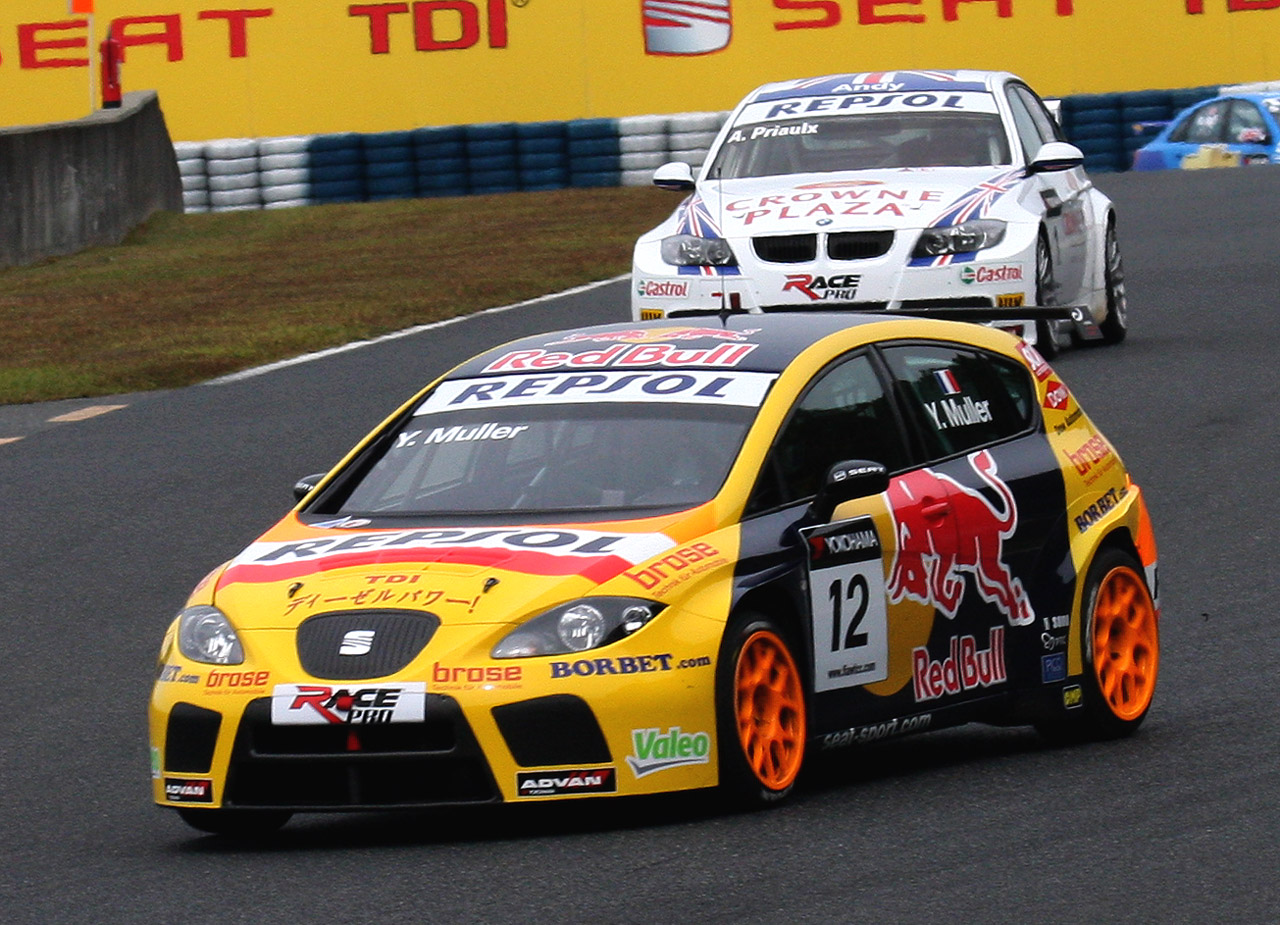
Yvan Muller (front) and SEAT won the 2008 championships, succeeding Andy Priaulx (behind) and BMW.

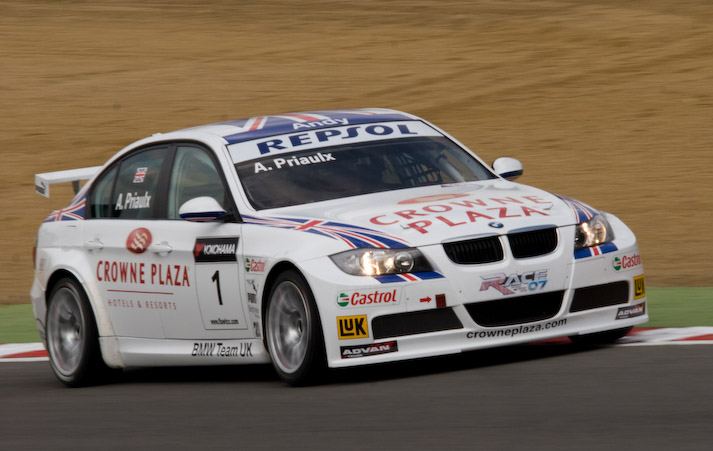
Andy Priaulx, BMW 320si, 2008 WTCC round, Brands Hatch

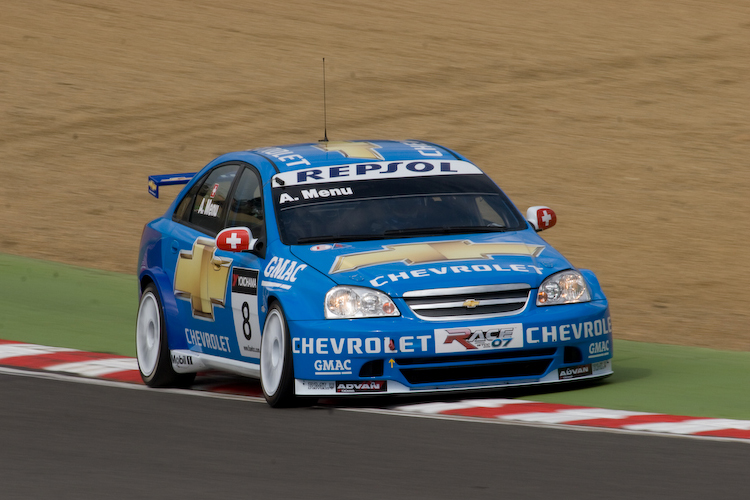
Alain Menu, Chevrolet Lacetti, 2008 WTCC round, Brands Hatch

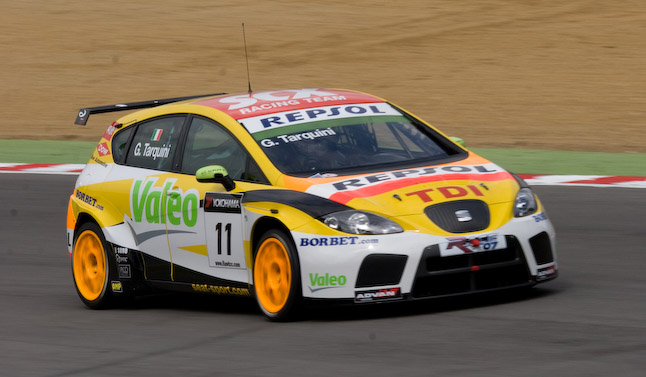
Gabriele Tarquini, SEAT León TDI, 2008 WTCC round, Brands Hatch

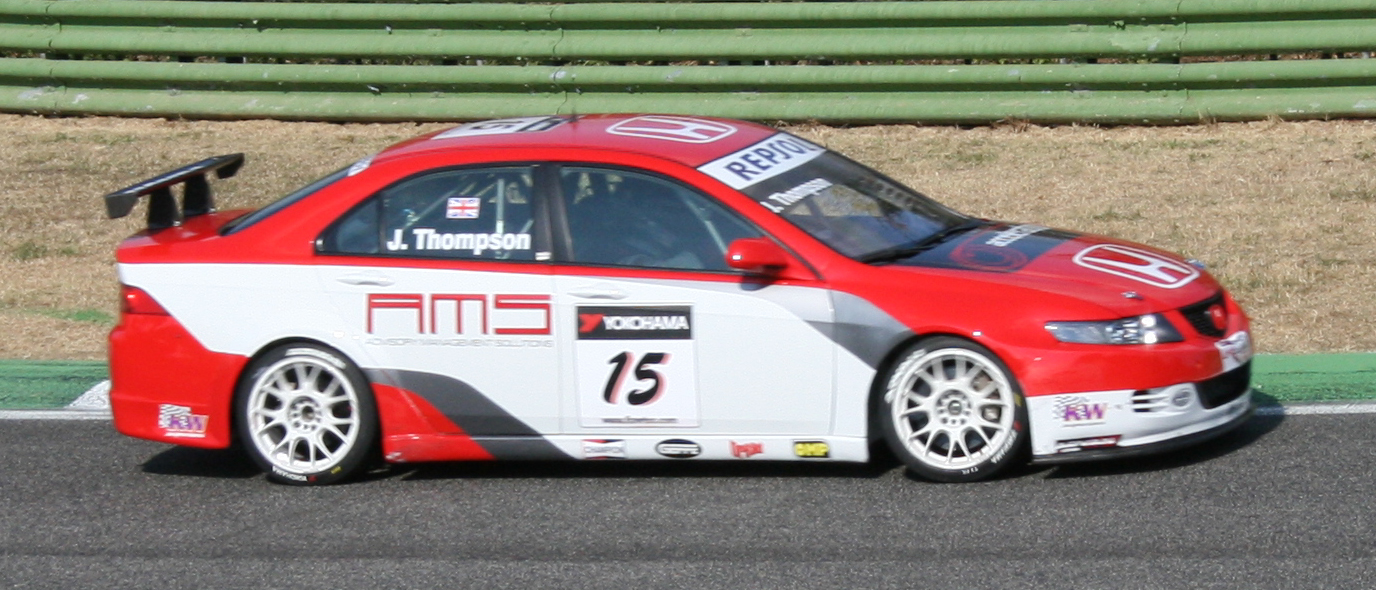
James Thompson, Honda Accord Euro R, 2008 WTCC round, Imola

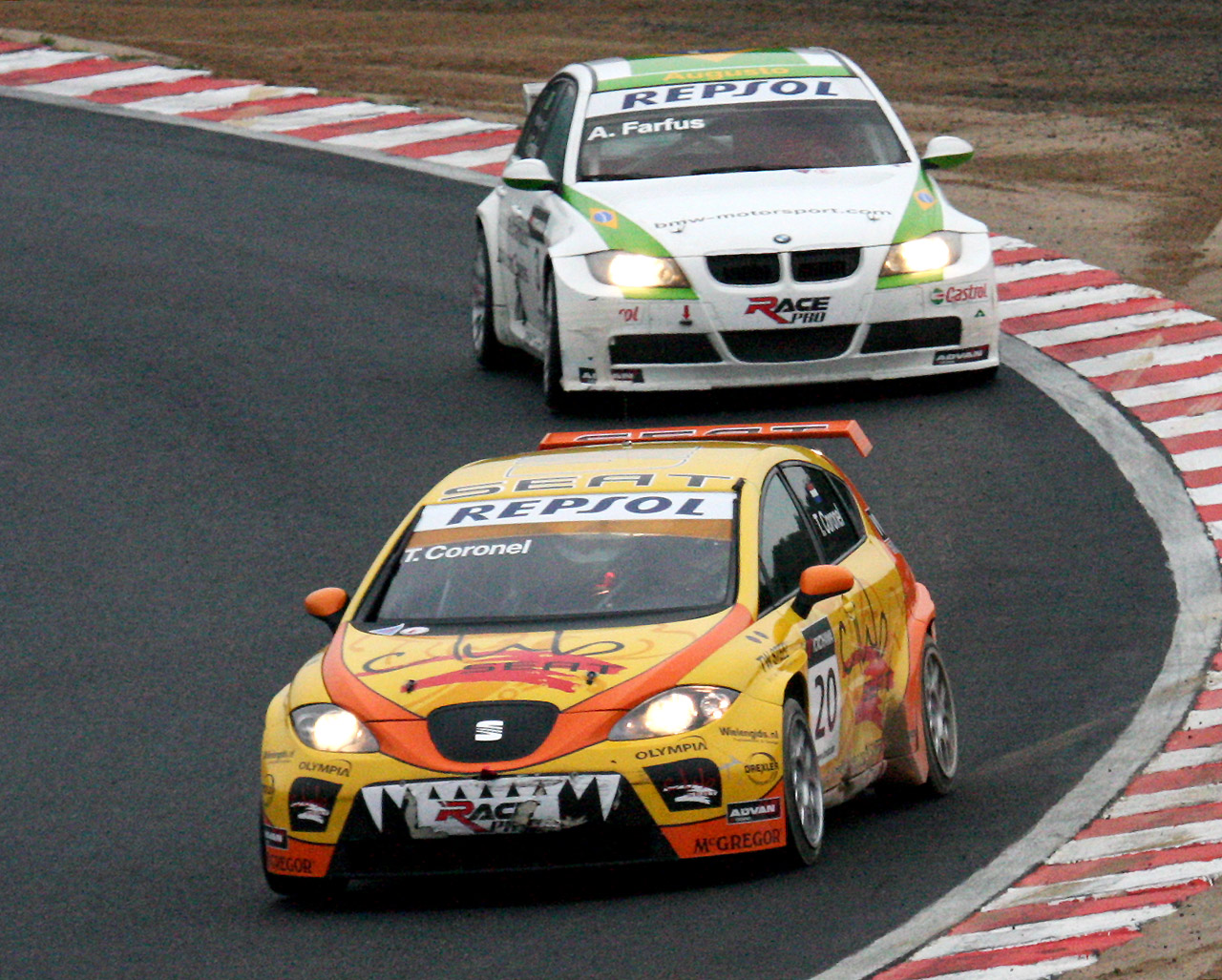
Tom Coronel, SEAT León TFSI, 2008 WTCC round, Okayama

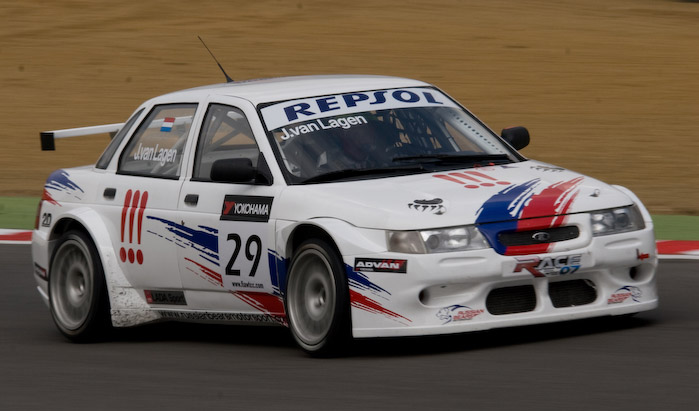
Jaap van Lagen, Lada 110 2.0, 2008 WTCC round, Brands Hatch

The full season entry list.

Team	Car	No.	Drivers	Rounds
Manufacturer Teams
(United Kingdom) BMW Team UK	BMW 320si	1	(United Kingdom) Andy Priaulx	All
BMW Team Germany	BMW 320si	2	(Germany) Jörg Müller	All
BMW Team Germany	BMW 320si	3	(Brazil) Augusto Farfus Jr.	All
BMW Team Italy-Spain	BMW 320si	4	(Italy) Alessandro Zanardi	All
BMW Team Italy-Spain	BMW 320si	5	(Spain) Félix Porteiro	All
(United Kingdom) Chevrolet RML	Chevrolet Lacetti	6	(Italy) Nicola Larini	All
(United Kingdom) Chevrolet RML	Chevrolet Lacetti	7	(United Kingdom) Robert Huff	All
(United Kingdom) Chevrolet RML	Chevrolet Lacetti	8	(Switzerland) Alain Menu	All
(Spain) SEAT Sport	SEAT León TDI	9	(Spain) Jordi Gené	All
(Spain) SEAT Sport	SEAT León TDI	10	(Sweden) Rickard Rydell	All
(Spain) SEAT Sport	SEAT León TDI	11	(Italy) Gabriele Tarquini	All
(Spain) SEAT Sport	SEAT León TDI	12	(France) Yvan Muller	All
(Spain) SEAT Sport	SEAT León TDI	18	(Portugal) Tiago Monteiro	All
(Spain) SEAT Sport	SEAT León	21	(Spain) José Manuel Pérez-Aicart	3
(Italy) N.technology	Honda Accord Euro R	15	(United Kingdom) James Thompson	3–12
(Spain) SUNRED Engineering	SEAT León	20	(Netherlands) Tom Coronel	All
Yokohama Trophy
(Turkey) Borusan Otomotiv Motorsport	BMW 320si	13	(Turkey) Ibrahim Okyay	All
(Turkey) Borusan Otomotiv Motorsport	BMW 320si	62	(Turkey) Aytaç Biter	7–8
(Germany) Wiechers-Sport	BMW 320si	16	(Netherlands) Olivier Tielemans	1–3, 5–6, 8
(Germany) Wiechers-Sport	BMW 320si	33	(France) Laurent Cazenave	4
(Germany) Wiechers-Sport	BMW 320si	49	(Netherlands) Duncan Huisman	8
(Germany) Wiechers-Sport	BMW 320si	60	(Denmark) Kristian Poulsen	10
(Denmark) Poulsen Motorsport	BMW 320si	60	(Denmark) Kristian Poulsen	6–8
(Spain) SUNRED Engineering	SEAT León	22	(Czech Republic) Michal Matejovský	5
(Spain) SUNRED Engineering	SEAT León	32	(Spain) Oscar Nogués	4
(Spain) SUNRED Engineering	SEAT León	75	(Hungary) Norbert Michelisz	11
(Spain) SUNRED Engineering	SEAT León	76	(Portugal) Lourenço Beirão da Veiga	7
(Spain) SUNRED Engineering	SEAT León	77	(United Kingdom) Tom Boardman	6
(Spain) SUNRED Engineering	SEAT León	78	(Croatia) Marin Čolak	8
(Spain) SUNRED Engineering	SEAT León	79	(Portugal) Duarte Félix da Costa	10
(France) Exagon Engineering	SEAT León	23	(Belgium) Pierre-Yves Corthals	1–10
(Italy) Scuderia Proteam Motorsport	BMW 320si	26	(Italy) Stefano D'Aste	1–11
(Italy) Scuderia Proteam Motorsport	BMW 320si	31	(Spain) Sergio Hernández	All
(Italy) Scuderia Proteam Motorsport	BMW 320si	45	(Bulgaria) Georgi Tanev	12
(Bulgaria) Petrol GT Racing Team	BMW 320si	45	(Bulgaria) Georgi Tanev	8–10
(Russia) Russian Bears Motorsport	Lada 110 2.0	27	(Russia) Kirill Ladygin	9–12
(Russia) Russian Bears Motorsport	Lada 110 2.0	28	(Russia) Viktor Shapovalov	3–12
(Russia) Russian Bears Motorsport	Lada 110 2.0	29	(Netherlands) Jaap van Lagen	3–12
(Germany) Liqui Moly Team Engstler	BMW 320si	42	(Germany) Franz Engstler	All
(Germany) Liqui Moly Team Engstler	BMW 320si	43	(Russia) Andrey Romanov	1–6, 8–12
(Russia) Golden Motors	Honda Accord Euro R	54	(Russia) Aleksandr Lvov	3, 5
(Russia) Golden Motors	Honda Accord Euro R	55	(Russia) Andrey Smetsky	3, 5
Asian Wild Card Entries
(Germany) Wiechers-Sport	BMW 320si	17	(Japan) Takayuki Aoki	10–12
(Germany) Wiechers-Sport	BMW 320si	88	(Hong Kong) Matthew Marsh	11–12
(Italy) N.technology	Honda Accord Euro R	66	(Macau) André Couto	12
(Italy) N.technology	Honda Accord Euro R	72	(Japan) Yukinori Taniguchi	10–11
(Singapore) Thunder Asia Racing	BMW 320si	69	(Singapore) Melvin Choo	11–12
(United Kingdom) Chevrolet RML	Chevrolet Lacetti	80	(Japan) Manabu Orido	10–12
(Germany) Liqui Moly Team Engstler	BMW 320i	81	(Japan) Masaki Kano	11–12
Guest Drivers
(Sweden) Volvo Olsbergs Green Racing	Volvo C30	63	(Sweden) Robert Dahlgren	7

Note: Macau-based RPM Racing Team had planned to race one Toyota Altezza and one Honda Civic Type-R for Macanese drivers Lei Kit Meng and Jo Rosa Merszei in the final races in Macau. Although car numbers were allocated to them (#64 for Meng (Toyota Altezza) and #65 for Merszei (Honda Civic)), the FIA Touring Car Bureau rejected the entries because neither of these cars had been homologated by the FIA.

=== Driver changes ===
Driver changes from the 2007 World Touring Car Championship were:

Changed Teams

- Olivier Tielemans: N-Technology → Wiechers-Sport
- Tom Coronel: GR Asia → SUNRED Engineering
- Stefano D'Aste: Wiechers-Sport → Scuderia Proteam Motorsport

Entering WTCC including those who entered one-off rounds in 2007

- Rickard Rydell: No full-time drive → SEAT Sport
- Ibrahim Okyay: Turkish Touring Car Championship → Borusan Otomotiv Motorsport
- Viktor Shapovalov: Dutch Supercar Challenge → Russian Bears Motorsport
- Jaap van Lagen: Porsche Supercup → Russian Bears Motorsport
- Franz Engstler: Asian Touring Car Series → Liqui Moly Team Engstler
- Andrey Romanov: Asian Touring Car Series → Liqui Moly Team Engstler

Leaving WTCC

- Michel Jourdain Jr.: SEAT Sport → No full-time drive
- Roberto Colciago: SEAT Sport Italia → Italian Endurance Touring Championship
- Emmet O'Brien: GR Asia → Danish Touring Car Championship
- Maurizio Ceresoli: GR Asia → No full-time drive
- Luca Rangoni: Scuderia Proteam Motorsport → Porsche Carrera Cup Italy
- Miguel Freitas: Racing for Belgium → SEAT León Supercopa Spain

== Calendar ==
A provisional calendar was released in November, 2007.

Sweden was to be included in the calendar for 21 September but the FIA confirmed on 3 May 2008 that the Swedish round at the Scandinavian Raceway was replaced by an Italy round at the revamped Imola Circuit.

Round		Race Name	Track	Date
1	R1	HSBC Race of Brazil	(Brazil) Autódromo Internacional de Curitiba	2 March
1	R2	HSBC Race of Brazil	(Brazil) Autódromo Internacional de Curitiba	2 March
2	R3	Telmex Race of Mexico	(Mexico) Autódromo Miguel E. Abed	6 April
2	R4	Telmex Race of Mexico	(Mexico) Autódromo Miguel E. Abed	6 April
3	R5	Monroe Race of Spain	(Spain) Circuit Ricardo Tormo	18 May
3	R6	Monroe Race of Spain	(Spain) Circuit Ricardo Tormo	18 May
4	R7	Courtyard Race of France	(France) Circuit de Pau Ville	1 June
4	R8	Courtyard Race of France	(France) Circuit de Pau Ville	1 June
5	R9	Stihl Race of the Czech Republic	(Czech Republic) Masaryk Circuit	15 June
5	R10	Stihl Race of the Czech Republic	(Czech Republic) Masaryk Circuit	15 June
6	R11	Race of Turismo de Portugal	(Portugal) Autódromo do Estoril	13 July
6	R12	Race of Turismo de Portugal	(Portugal) Autódromo do Estoril	13 July
7	R13	Courtyard Race of UK	(United Kingdom) Brands Hatch	27 July
7	R14	Courtyard Race of UK	(United Kingdom) Brands Hatch	27 July
8	R15	Atari Race of Germany	(Germany) Motorsport Arena Oschersleben	31 August
8	R16	Atari Race of Germany	(Germany) Motorsport Arena Oschersleben	31 August
9	R17	Courtyard Race of Europe	(Italy) Autodromo Enzo e Dino Ferrari	21 September
9	R18	Courtyard Race of Europe	(Italy) Autodromo Enzo e Dino Ferrari	21 September
10	R19	Monroe Race of Italy	(Italy) Autodromo Nazionale di Monza	5 October
10	R20	Monroe Race of Italy	(Italy) Autodromo Nazionale di Monza	5 October
11	R21	Race Pro of Japan	(Japan) Okayama International Circuit	26 October
11	R22	Race Pro of Japan	(Japan) Okayama International Circuit	26 October
12	R23	Canon Race of Macau	(Macau) Guia Circuit	16 November
12	R24	Canon Race of Macau	(Macau) Guia Circuit	16 November

== Results and standings ==
=== Races ===
Race	Race Name	Pole Position	Fastest lap	Winning driver	Winning team	Winning independent	Report
1	Race of Brazil	(France) Yvan Muller	(United Kingdom) Andy Priaulx	(France) Yvan Muller	(Spain) SEAT Sport	(Netherlands) Olivier Tielemans	Report
2	Race of Brazil		(Brazil) Augusto Farfus	(Italy) Gabriele Tarquini	(Spain) SEAT Sport	(Netherlands) Olivier Tielemans	Report
3	Race of Mexico	(Spain) Jordi Gené	(Portugal) Tiago Monteiro	(Spain) Jordi Gené	(Spain) SEAT Sport	(Belgium) Pierre-Yves Corthals	Report
4	Race of Mexico		(France) Yvan Muller	(Portugal) Tiago Monteiro	(Spain) SEAT Sport	(Belgium) Pierre-Yves Corthals	Report
5	Race of Spain	(France) Yvan Muller	(Germany) Jörg Müller	(United Kingdom) Robert Huff	(United Kingdom) Chevrolet RML	(Italy) Stefano D'Aste	Report
6	Race of Spain		(Switzerland) Alain Menu	(Switzerland) Alain Menu	(United Kingdom) Chevrolet RML	(Spain) Sergio Hernández	Report
7	Race of France	(Brazil) Augusto Farfus	(Brazil) Augusto Farfus	(Brazil) Augusto Farfus	BMW Team Germany	(France) Laurent Cazenave	Report
8	Race of France		(Sweden) Rickard Rydell	(United Kingdom) Andy Priaulx	(United Kingdom) BMW Team UK	(Italy) Stefano D'Aste	Report
9	Race of the Czech Republic	(Italy) Alessandro Zanardi	(Spain) Félix Porteiro	(Italy) Alessandro Zanardi	BMW Team Italy-Spain	(Spain) Sergio Hernández	Report
10	Race of the Czech Republic		(Italy) Alessandro Zanardi	(Italy) Gabriele Tarquini	(Spain) SEAT Sport	(Spain) Sergio Hernández	Report
11	Race of Portugal	(Italy) Nicola Larini	(Italy) Nicola Larini	(Sweden) Rickard Rydell	(Spain) SEAT Sport	(Belgium) Pierre-Yves Corthals	Report
12	Race of Portugal		(Italy) Nicola Larini	(Portugal) Tiago Monteiro	(Spain) SEAT Sport	(Spain) Sergio Hernández	Report
13	(United Kingdom) Race of UK	(Brazil) Augusto Farfus	(United Kingdom) Robert Huff	(Germany) Jörg Müller	BMW Team Germany	(Italy) Stefano D'Aste	Report
14	(United Kingdom) Race of UK		(Brazil) Augusto Farfus	(Switzerland) Alain Menu	(United Kingdom) Chevrolet RML	(Italy) Stefano D'Aste	Report
15	Race of Germany	(United Kingdom) Robert Huff	(Brazil) Augusto Farfus	(Brazil) Augusto Farfus	BMW Team Germany	(Italy) Stefano D'Aste	Report
16	Race of Germany		(Brazil) Augusto Farfus	(Spain) Félix Porteiro	BMW Team Italy-Spain	(Spain) Sergio Hernández	Report
17	(Italy) Race of Europe	(Sweden) Rickard Rydell	(United Kingdom) James Thompson	(France) Yvan Muller	(Spain) SEAT Sport	(Spain) Sergio Hernández	Report
18	(Italy) Race of Europe		(Portugal) Tiago Monteiro	(United Kingdom) James Thompson	(Italy) N.Technology	(Spain) Sergio Hernández	Report
19	Race of Italy	(France) Yvan Muller	(United Kingdom) Andy Priaulx	(France) Yvan Muller	(Spain) SEAT Sport	(Belgium) Pierre-Yves Corthals	Report
20	Race of Italy		(Switzerland) Alain Menu	(Italy) Gabriele Tarquini	(Spain) SEAT Sport	(Spain) Sergio Hernández	Report
21	Race of Japan	(Brazil) Augusto Farfus	(Germany) Jörg Müller	(Sweden) Rickard Rydell	(Spain) SEAT Sport	(Italy) Stefano D'Aste	Report
22	Race of Japan		(United Kingdom) James Thompson	(Netherlands) Tom Coronel	(Spain) SUNRED Racing	(Spain) Sergio Hernández	Report
23	Guia Race of Macau	(Switzerland) Alain Menu	(United Kingdom) Andy Priaulx	(Switzerland) Alain Menu	(United Kingdom) Chevrolet RML	(Spain) Sergio Hernández	Report
24	Guia Race of Macau		(Brazil) Augusto Farfus	(United Kingdom) Robert Huff	(United Kingdom) Chevrolet RML	(Germany) Franz Engstler	Report

== Championship standings ==
Points system
**1st**	**2nd**	**3rd**	**4th**	**5th**	**6th**	**7th**	**8th**
10	8	6	5	4	3	2	1

=== Drivers' Championship ===
The final standings in the 2008 FIA World Touring Car Championship for Drivers were :

Pos	Driver	BRA (Brazil)		MEX (Mexico)		ESP (Spain)		FRA (France)		CZE (Czech Republic)		POR (Portugal)		UK (United Kingdom)		GER (Germany)		EUR (Italy)		ITA (Italy)		JPN (Japan)		MAC (Macau)		Pts
1	(France) Yvan Muller	**1**	5	6	4	**4**	8	2	7	8	**5**	3	2	2	11	11	8	1	5	**1**	4	7	6	3	2	**114**
2	(Italy) Gabriele Tarquini	5	1	5	3	2	5	5	4	6	1	13	11	7	5	24	16	5	Ret	2	1	10	Ret	7	12†	**88**
3	(United Kingdom) Robert Huff	Ret	Ret	9	9	1	2	4	5	9	DSQ	4	5	21	10	**2**	3	4	3	6	26†	4	5	5	1	**87**
4	(United Kingdom) Andy Priaulx	4	2	10	8	7	3	8	**1**	14	8	6	3	3	Ret	Ret	5	11	7	3	25†	3	22†	2	3	**81**
5	(Sweden) Rickard Rydell	2	7	2	2	10	7	6	3	10	17	1	8	11	9	6	20	**2**	6	16	9	1	9	Ret	4	**77**
6	(Brazil) Augusto Farfus	DSQ	6	11	10	Ret	20	**1**	6	4	3	Ret	10	**Ret**	6	1	6	7	8	Ret	8	**6**	2	4	11†	**63**
7	(Germany) Jörg Müller	3	4	14	12	5	4	9	13	5	7	9	7	1	4	26	9	8	**2**	9	10	2	Ret	10	Ret	**60**
8	(Spain) Jordi Gené	11	8	**1**	5	3	6	3	19	13	14	5	9	9	Ret	5	4	17	17	7	2	11	10	6	Ret	**56**
9	(Switzerland) Alain Menu	Ret	10	8	**7**	8	**1**	10	Ret	3	6	11	14	8	**1**	3	Ret	Ret	12	11	5	Ret	13	**1**	13†	**54**
10	(Spain) Félix Porteiro	6	3	16	20†	22	10	15	12	2	4	8	**4**	6	2	8	**1**	10	Ret	NC	12	Ret	8	14	DNS	**51**
11	(Italy) Nicola Larini	Ret	12	3	Ret	6	9	7	2	11	11	**2**	6	23	12	Ret	11	6	4	5	3	16	12	9	Ret	**48**
12	(Portugal) Tiago Monteiro	17	13	7	1	18	Ret	13	10	12	10	7	1	16	15	4	Ret	13	11	4	6	5	7	11	Ret	**43**
13	(Italy) Alessandro Zanardi	15	11	15	11	12	18	12	11	**1**	2	20	13	4	3	12	19	12	9	8	**7**	13	Ret	23†	5	**36**
14	(Netherlands) Tom Coronel	7	**9**	4	6	9	DNS	14	9	18	12	10	12	5	22	7	2	15	15	10	24†	8	**1**	22†	Ret	**35**
15	(United Kingdom) James Thompson					11	11	11	8	7	9	DNS	DNS	10	14	15	Ret	3	1	Ret	11	17	4	8	**14**†	**25**
16	(Spain) Sergio Hernández	14†	15	17	15	23	12	17	17	15	13	Ret	15	13	8	10	7	9	10	14	13	12	3	12	Ret	**9**
17	(Germany) Franz Engstler	10	17	18	16	17	17	19	15	16	23†	18	18	17	13	Ret	15	16	14	13	16	14	11	15	6	**3**
18	(Italy) Stefano D'Aste	9	16	13	14	14	15	18	14	25†	21	19	16	12	7	9	13	18	16	24	14	9	23†			**2**
19	(Japan) Manabu Orido																			15	17	Ret	18	16	7	**2**
20	(Netherlands) Olivier Tielemans	8	14	19	17	15	Ret			19	Ret	Ret	DNS			22	18									**1**
21	(Hong Kong) Matthew Marsh																					21	14	17	8	**1**
—	(Russia) Andrey Romanov	12	19	20	18	16	Ret	20	20	20	16	16	20			17	Ret	20	20	18	Ret	22	15	20	9	**0**
—	(Turkey) Ibrahim Okyay	16	20	21	19	24	19	Ret	Ret	Ret	19	17	23	18	Ret	19	Ret	Ret	21	19	21	Ret	DNS	18	10	**0**
—	(Netherlands) Duncan Huisman															16	10									**0**
—	(Belgium) Pierre-Yves Corthals	13	18	12	13	Ret	13	Ret	21	17	15	12	19	14	16	25†	12	14	13	12	Ret					**0**
—	(Spain) José Manuel Pérez-Aicart					13	14																			**0**
—	(Croatia) Marin Čolak															13	17									**0**
—	(Macau) André Couto																							13	Ret	**0**
—	(Denmark) Kristian Poulsen											14	22	15	17	18	14			23†	15					**0**
—	(Netherlands) Jaap van Lagen					Ret	Ret	21	18	21	Ret	15	21	DNS	18	14	22	19	18	Ret	19	18	17	21	Ret	**0**
—	(Japan) Takayuki Aoki																			17	Ret	15	Ret	Ret	15†	**0**
—	(Russia) Aleksandr Lvov					19	16			23	20															**0**
—	(France) Laurent Cazenave							16	Ret																	**0**
—	(Hungary) Norbert Michelisz																					Ret	16			**0**
—	(Spain) Oscar Nogués							Ret	16																	**0**
—	(United Kingdom) Tom Boardman											Ret	17													**0**
—	(Bulgaria) Georgi Tanev															21	21	21	19	20	18			19	Ret	**0**
—	(Russia) Viktor Shapovalov					20	Ret	DNQ	DNQ	Ret	18	Ret	24	19	20	20	23	Ret	DNS	Ret	22	DNS	DNS	DNS	DNS	**0**
—	(Japan) Yukinori Taniguchi																			21	Ret	20	19			**0**
—	(Portugal) Lourenço Beirão da Veiga													20	19											**0**
—	(Russia) Kirill Ladygin																	Ret	22	22	23	19	Ret	Ret	Ret	**0**
—	(Singapore) Melvin Choo																					23	20	Ret	Ret	**0**
—	(Portugal) Duarte Félix Da Costa																			Ret	20					**0**
—	(Russia) Andrey Smetsky					21	21			24	22															**0**
—	(Turkey) Aytaç Biter													22	21	23	24									**0**
—	(Japan) Masaki Kano																					24	21	Ret	DNS	**0**
—	(Czech Republic) Michal Matejovský									22	Ret															**0**
guest drivers ineligible for points
—	(Sweden) Robert Dahlgren													24†	DNS											*
Pos	Driver	BRA (Brazil)		MEX (Mexico)		ESP (Spain)		FRA (France)		CZE (Czech Republic)		POR (Portugal)		UK (United Kingdom)		GER (Germany)		EUR (Italy)		ITA (Italy)		JPN (Japan)		MAC (Macau)		Pts

Colour	Result
Gold	Winner
Silver	Second place
Bronze	Third place
Green	Points classification
Blue	Non-points classification
Blue	Non-classified finish (NC)
Purple	Retired, not classified (Ret)
Red	Did not qualify (DNQ)
Red	Did not pre-qualify (DNPQ)
Black	Disqualified (DSQ)
White	Did not start (DNS)
White	Withdrew (WD)
White	Race cancelled (C)
Blank	Did not practice (DNP)
Blank	Did not arrive (DNA)
Blank	Excluded (EX)

**Bold** – Pole
Italics – Fastest Lap

† — Drivers did not finish the race, but were classified as they completed over 90% of the race distance.

Drivers' Championship points were awarded on a 10–8–6–5–4–3–2–1 basis to the first eight finishers in each race.

=== Manufacturers' Championship ===
Pos	Manufacturer	BRA (Brazil)		MEX (Mexico)		ESP (Spain)		FRA (France)		CZE (Czech Republic)		POR (Portugal)		UK (United Kingdom)		GER (Germany)		EUR (Italy)		ITA (Italy)		JPN (Japan)		MAC (Macau)		Pts
1	(Spain) SEAT	1	1	1	1	2	5	2	3	6	1	1	1	2	5	4	2	1	5	1	1	1	1	3	2	326
1	(Spain) SEAT	2	5	2	2	3	6	3	4	8	5	3	2	5	9	5	4	2	6	2	2	5	6	6	4	326
2	(Germany) BMW	3	2	10	8	5	3	1	1	1	2	6	3	1	2	1	1	7	2	3	7	2	2	2	3	274
2	(Germany) BMW	4	3	11	10	7	4	8	6	2	3	8	4	3	3	8	5	8	7	8	8	3	3	4	5	274
3	(United States) Chevrolet	Ret	10	3	7	1	1	4	2	3	6	2	5	8	1	2	3	4	3	5	3	4	5	1	1	238
3	(United States) Chevrolet	Ret	12	8	9	6	2	7	5	9	11	4	6	21	10	3	11	6	4	6	5	16	12	5	13	238
4	(Japan) Honda					11	11	11	8	7	9	DNS	DNS	10	14	15	Ret	3	1	21	11	17	4	8	14	60
4	(Japan) Honda					19	16			23	20									Ret	Ret	20	19	13	Ret	60
Pos	Manufacturer	BRA (Brazil)		MEX (Mexico)		ESP (Spain)		FRA (France)		CZE (Czech Republic)		POR (Portugal)		UK (United Kingdom)		GER (Germany)		EUR (Italy)		ITA (Italy)		JPN (Japan)		MAC (Macau)		Pts

Manufacturers' Championship points were awarded on a 10–8–6–5–4–3–2–1 basis to the first eight finishers in each race. However, only the results of the best two cars for each manufacturer were taken into account.

=== Yokohama Independents' Trophy ===
Championship promoter KSO (Kigema Sport Organisation Ltd) organised the Yokohama Independents’ Trophies within the 2008 FIA World Touring Car Championship.

Eligibility for the Independent Drivers’ Trophy was exclusively decided by KSO, taking into consideration the Team’s CV and records, the Driver’s CV and records and the Car’s technical characteristics.

Pos	Driver	BRA (Brazil)		MEX (Mexico)		ESP (Spain)		FRA (France)		CZE (Czech Republic)		POR (Portugal)		UK (United Kingdom)		GER (Germany)		EUR (Italy)		ITA (Italy)		JPN (Japan)		MAC (Macau)		Pts
1	(Spain) Sergio Hernández	14†	15	17	15	23	12	17	17	**15**	**13**	**Ret**	15	**13**	8	10	7	**9**	**10**	14	13	12	3	**12**	**Ret**	186
2	(Germany) Franz Engstler	10	17	18	16	17	17	19	15	16	23†	18	18	17	13	Ret	15	16	14	13	16	14	11	15	6	149
3	(Italy) Stefano D'Aste	9	16	13	14	**14**	**15**	18	14	25†	21	19	16	12	**7**	9	**13**	18	16	24	14	**9**	**23**†			137
4	(Belgium) Pierre-Yves Corthals	**13**	18	**12**	**13**	Ret	13	Ret	21	17	15	12	**19**	14	16	**25**†	12	14	13	**12**	**Ret**					112
5	(Russia) Andrei Romanov	12	19	20	18	16	Ret	20	20	20	16	16	20			17	Ret	20	20	18	Ret	22	15	20	9	83
6	(Turkey) Ibrahim Okyay	16	20	21	19	24	19	Ret	Ret	Ret	19	17	23	18	Ret	19	Ret	Ret	21	19	21	Ret	DNS	18	10	51
7	(Netherlands) Olivier Tielemans	8	**14**	19	17	15	Ret			19	Ret	Ret	DNS			22	18									43
8	(Netherlands) Jaap van Lagen											15	21	DNS	18	14	22	19	18	Ret	19	18	17	21	Ret	38
9	(Hong Kong) Matthew Marsh																					21	14	17	8	36
10	(Denmark) Kristian Poulsen											14	22	15	17	18	14			23†	15					32
11	(Bulgaria) Georgi Tanev															21	21	21	19	20	18			19	Ret	20
12	(Japan) Takayuki Aoki																			17	Ret	15	Ret	Ret	15†	18
13	(Russia) Aleksandr Lvov					19	16			23	20															15
14	(France) Laurent Cazenave							16	**Ret**																	10
15	(Croatia) Marin Čolak															13	17									9
16	(Russia) Andrey Smetsky					21	21			24	22															8
17	(Spain) Oscar Nogués							**Ret**	16																	6
18	(United Kingdom) Tom Boardman											Ret	17													6
19	(Hungary) Norbert Michelisz																					Ret	16			4
20	(Russia) Kirill Ladygin																	Ret	22	22	23	19	Ret	Ret	Ret	4
21	(Russia) Viktor Shapovalov											Ret	24	19	20	20	23	Ret	DNS	Ret	22	DNS	DNS	DNS	DNS	4
22	(Czech Republic) Michal Matějovský									22	Ret															3
23	(Portugal) Lourenço Beirão da Veiga													20	19											3
24	(Portugal) Duarte Félix da Costa																			Ret	20					2
25	(Singapore) Melvin Choo																					23	20	Ret	Ret	2
26	(Japan) Masaki Kano																					24	21	Ret	DNS	1
—	(Turkey) Aytaç Biter													22	21	23	24									0
Pos	Driver	BRA (Brazil)		MEX (Mexico)		ESP (Spain)		FRA (France)		CZE (Czech Republic)		POR (Portugal)		UK (United Kingdom)		GER (Germany)		EUR (Italy)		ITA (Italy)		JPN (Japan)		MAC (Macau)		Pts

The Yokohama Independents' Trophy used a similar system to the Drivers’ Championship, however double points are awarded at Macau.

=== Yokohama Teams' Trophy ===
Pos	Team	BRA (Brazil)		MEX (Mexico)		ESP (Spain)		FRA (France)		CZE (Czech Republic)		POR (Portugal)		UK (United Kingdom)		GER (Germany)		EUR (Italy)		ITA (Italy)		JPN (Japan)		MAC (Macau)		Pts
1	(Italy) Scuderia Proteam Motorsport	9	15	13	14	14	12	17	14	15	13	19	15	12	7	9	7	9	10	14	13	9	3	12	Ret	334
1	(Italy) Scuderia Proteam Motorsport	14†	16	17	15	23	15	18	17	25†	21	Ret	16	13	8	10	13	18	16	24	14	12	23†	19	Ret	334
2	(Germany) Liqui Moly Team Engstler	10	17	18	16	16	17	19	15	16	16	16	18	17	13	17	15	16	14	13	16	14	11	15	6	228
2	(Germany) Liqui Moly Team Engstler	12	19	20	18	17	Ret	20	20	20	23†	18	20			Ret	Ret	20	20	18	Ret	22	15	20	9	228
3	(France) Exagon Engineering	13	18	12	13	Ret	13	Ret	21	17	15	12	19	14	16	25†	12	14	13	12	Ret					112
4	(Germany) Wiechers-Sport	8	14	19	17	15	Ret	16	Ret	19	Ret	Ret	DNS			22	18			17	15	15	14	17	8	105
4	(Germany) Wiechers-Sport																			23†	Ret	21	Ret	Ret	15†	105
5	(Turkey) Borusan Otomotiv Motorsport	16	20	21	19	24	19	Ret	Ret	Ret	19	17	23	18	21	19	24	Ret	21	19	21	Ret	DNS	18	10	51
5	(Turkey) Borusan Otomotiv Motorsport													22	Ret	23	Ret									51
6	(Russia) Russian Bears Motorsport											15	21	19	18	14	22	19	18	22	19	18	17	21	Ret	46
6	(Russia) Russian Bears Motorsport											Ret	24	DNS	20	20	23	Ret	22	Ret	22	19	Ret	Ret	Ret	46
7	(Spain) SUNRED Engineering							Ret	16	22	Ret	Ret	17	20	19	13	17			Ret	20	Ret	16			33
8	(Denmark) Poulsen Motorsport											14	22	15	17	18	14									26
9	(Russia) Golden Motors					19	16			23	20															23
9	(Russia) Golden Motors					21	21			24	22															23
10	(Bulgaria) Petrol GT Racing Team															21	21	21	19	20	18					12
11	(Singapore) Thunder Asia Racing																					23	20	Ret	Ret	2
Pos	Team	BRA (Brazil)		MEX (Mexico)		ESP (Spain)		FRA (France)		CZE (Czech Republic)		POR (Portugal)		UK (United Kingdom)		GER (Germany)		EUR (Italy)		ITA (Italy)		JPN (Japan)		MAC (Macau)		Pts

All the teams taking part in any of the rounds of the 2008 FIA World Touring Car Championship were eligible to score points for the Yokohama Teams' Trophy. Points were awarded to the two best classified cars of each team, providing they were driven by Independent drivers. All other cars of that same team were considered invisible as far as scoring points was concerned.
