= Viktor Shapovalov =

Russian racing driver (born 1965)

- Nationality: Russian
- Born: Viktor Leonidovich Shapovalov; 4 March 1965 (age 61) Sterlitamak, Bashkir ASSR, Soviet Union

World Touring Car Championship career
- Debut season: 2007
- Current team: Lada Sport
- Car number: 20
- Starts: 31
- Wins: 0
- Poles: 0
- Fastest laps: 0
- Best finish: 29th in 2009

Previous series
- 2007 2006 2005–06, 2006–07 1998: Dutch Supercar Challenge; Russian Touring Car Championship; Dutch Winter Endurance Series; Russian Touring Car Cup

Championship titles
- 1998: Russian Touring Car Cup 1600

Viktor Leonidovich Shapovalov (born 4 March 1965) is a Russian auto racing driver. Most of his career has been in touring cars, competing in the Russian Touring Car Championship as well as the Dutch Supercar Challenge. In 1998 he won the 1600 Class Russian Touring Car Cup with a Lada Samara.

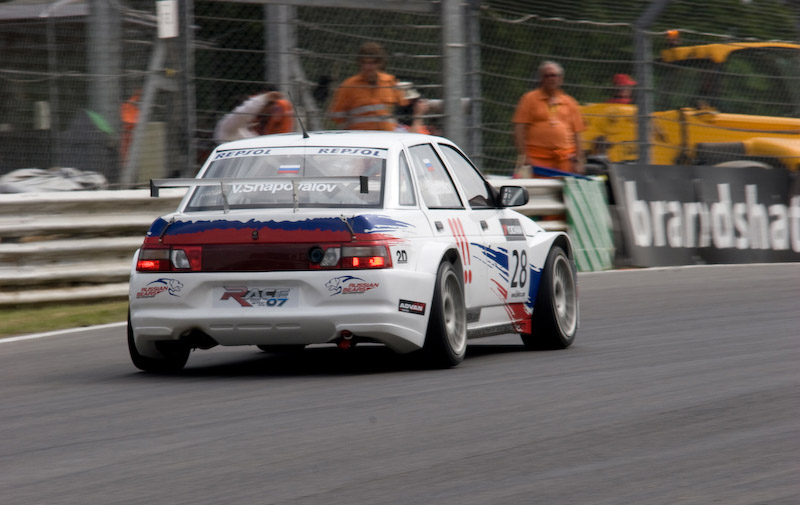
Shapovalov in a Lada 110 at Brands Hatch in the 2008 WTCC

In 2007 he first competed in the World Touring Car Championship for his own Russian Bears Motorsport team in a BMW 320i. The team entered just four rounds at Zandvoort and Valencia, with little success. He returned for the 2008 season with the surprising entry of a Lada 110, competing in fourteen rounds. His best finish this year was an eighteenth place at Brno. For the 2009 season he returned with full manufacturer backing from Lada. Halfway through the 2009 season Shapovalov retired from driving duties to concentrate on running the LADA Sport operation as they run James Thompson in the new Lada Priora model.

== Racing record ==
=== Complete WTCC results ===
(key) (Races in bold indicate pole position) (Races in italics indicate fastest lap)

Year	Team	Car	1		2		3		4		5		6		7		8		9		10		11	12	Position	Points
2007	Russian Bears Motorsport	BMW 320i	CUR (Brazil)		ZAN (Netherlands)		VAL (Spain)		PAU (France)		BRN (Czech Republic)		POR (Portugal)		AND (Sweden)		OSC (Germany)		BRA (United Kingdom)		MON (Italy)		MAC (Macau)		-	0
2007	Russian Bears Motorsport	BMW 320i			19	23	20	21																	-	0
2008	Russian Bears Motorsport	Lada 110 2.0	CUR (Brazil)		PUE (Mexico)		VAL (Spain)		PAU (France)		BRN (Czech Republic)		EST (Portugal)		BRA (United Kingdom)		OSC (Germany)		IMO (Italy)		MON (Italy)		OKA (Japan)	MAC (Macau)	-	0
2008	Russian Bears Motorsport	Lada 110 2.0					20	Ret	DNQ		Ret	18	Ret	24	19	20	20	23	Ret	DNS	Ret	22			-	0
2009	LADA Sport	LADA 110 2.0	CUR (Brazil)		PUE (Mexico)		MAR (Morocco)		PAU (France)		VAL (Spain)		BRN (Czech Republic)		POR (Portugal)		BRA (United Kingdom)		OSC (Germany)		IMO (Italy)		OKA (Japan)	MAC (Macau)	29th	0
2009	LADA Sport	LADA 110 2.0	13	23	19	19	22	17	17	15	20	21	16	20											29th	0
2009	LADA Sport	LADA Priora																	Ret	24					29th	0

- * Season still in progress.
