= Exagon Engineering =

French auto racing team

- Founded: 2004; 22 years ago
- Nation: France
- Base: Magny-Cours
- Team principal(s): Luc Marchetti
- Former series: World Touring Car Championship

Exagon Engineering is a French auto racing team which is based in Magny-Cours. The team was founded by director Luc Marchetti in 2004, and is managed by former racer Cathy Muller who is the older sister of successful touring car driver Yvan Muller. Exagon Engineering are best known for preparing cars to enter in the FIA World Touring Car Championship, although they also run cars in other events such as rallycross, sportscar racing and ice racing.

They first entered the WTCC in 2007, running a SEAT León for Belgian driver Pierre-Yves Corthals in a full campaign, as well as Frenchman Anthony Beltoise in two rounds. Corthals returned in 2008 but did not continue in 2009 due to his main sponsor withdrawing its backing. From round five at Marrakech of the 2009 season, Exagon Engineering ran a León for Moroccan Mehdi Bennani.

== Exagon Motors ==
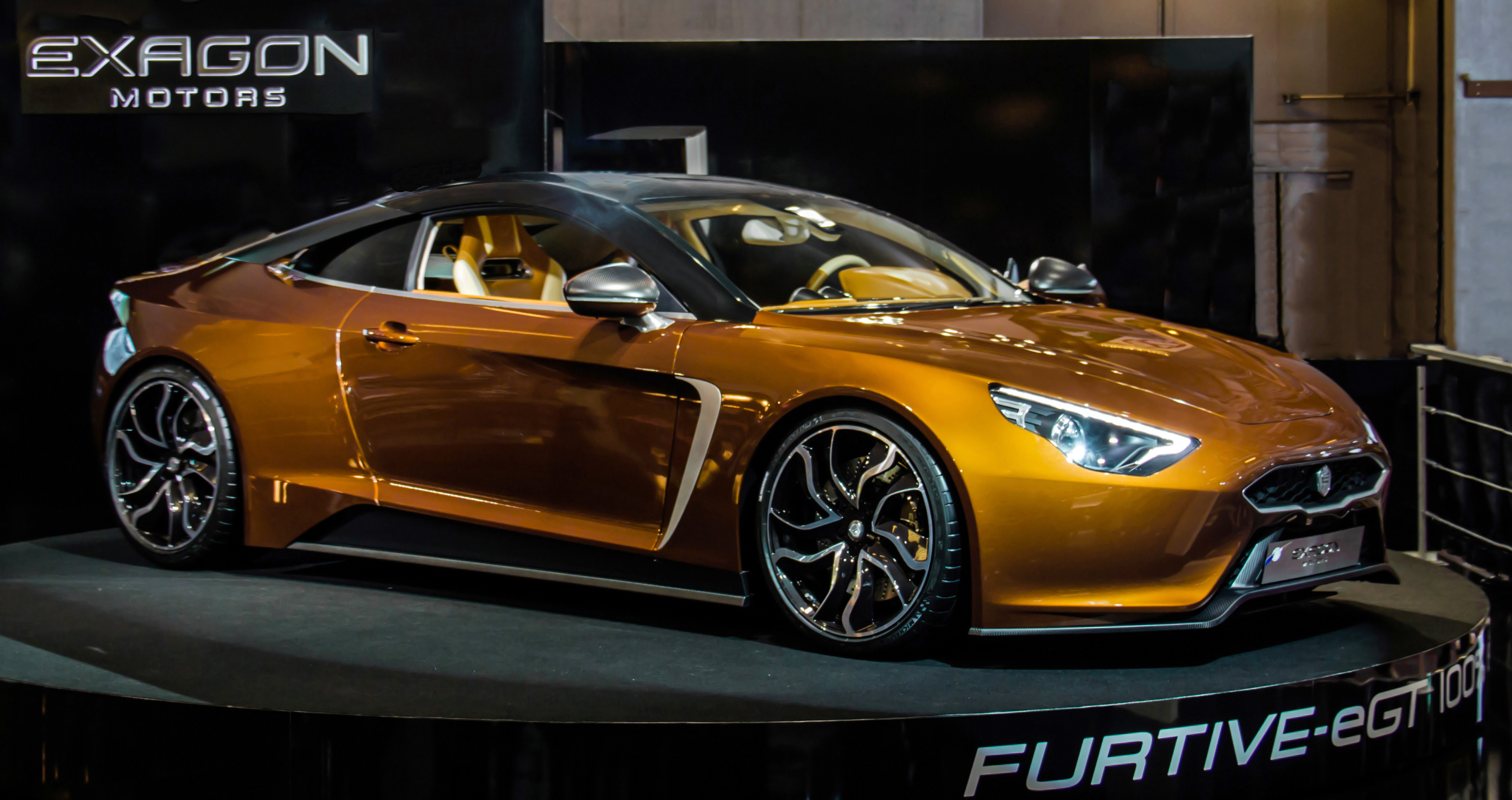
Exagon Furtive-eGT

Exagon Motors was established in 2009 as a division of Exagon Engineering to develop a production road car. It unveiled its first car, the Furtive-eGT at the Paris Motor Show in 2012.
