= Laurent Cazenave =

French auto racing driver

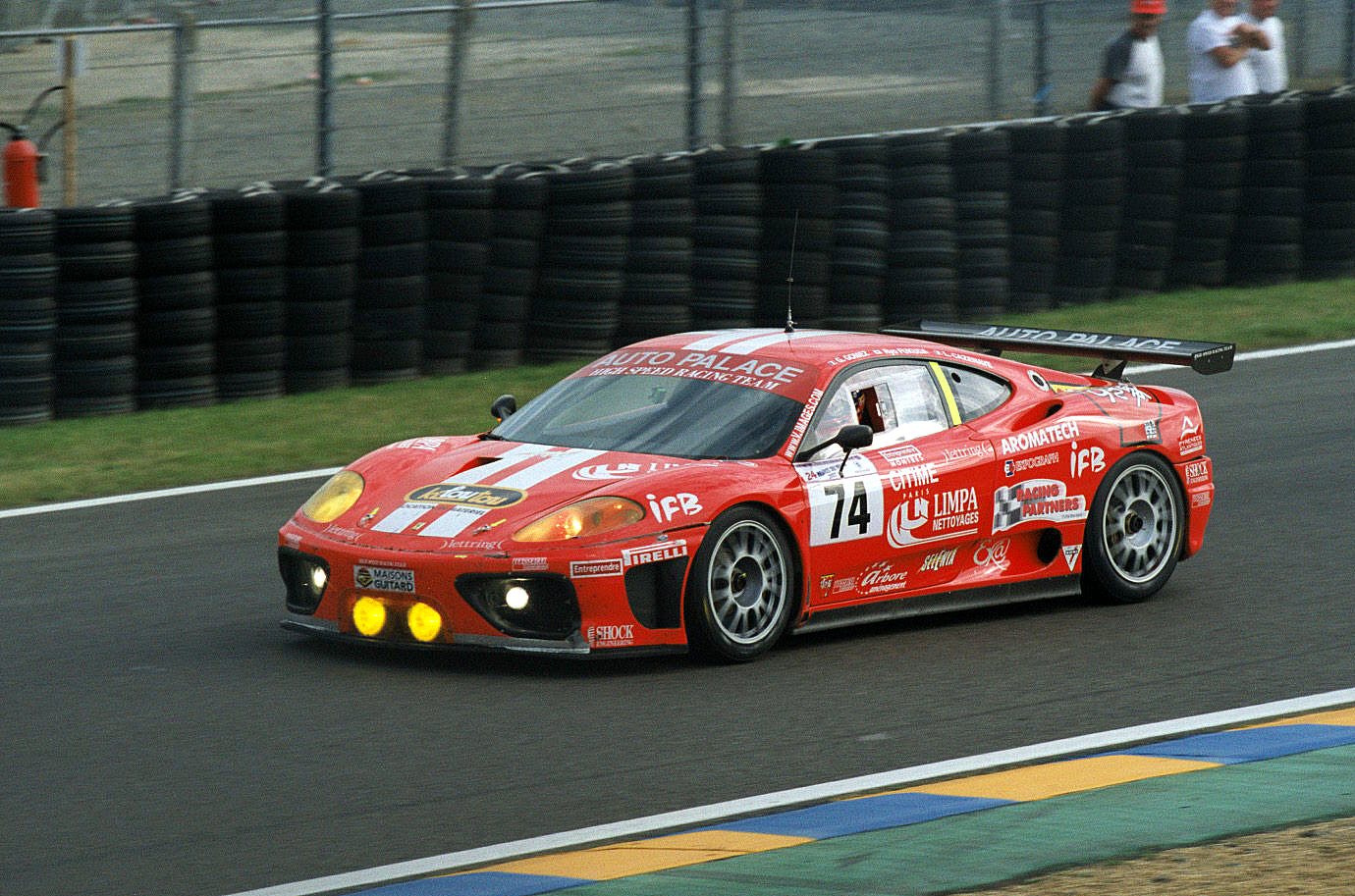
- Cazenave in his Ferrari at the 2002 Le Mans 24 Hours.
- Nationality: (France) French
- Born: Laurent Etienne René Cazenave; 25 April 1978 (age 48) Pau (France)

World Touring Car Championship career
- Debut season: 2008
- Current team: Wiechers-Sport
- Categorisation: FIA Silver (until 2019); FIA Bronze (2020–)
- Car number: 33
- Starts: 4
- Wins: 0
- Poles: 0
- Fastest laps: 0
- Best finish: 33rd in 2008

Previous series
- 2008 2004 2002–08 2001 1999–2000 1997 1995 1994: MitJet Series; French Supertouring; French GT Championship; FIA GT Championship; French Super Production; French Formula Ford Championship; French Formula Campus; Volant Elf Magny-Cours

Laurent Etienne René Cazenave (born 25 April 1978, in Pau) is a French auto racing driver. In 1997, he finished third in Class B of the French Formula Ford Championship. From there, he switched to saloon car racing in 1999, with two years in the French Super Production Championship. He finished third in his second year with two race wins, driving a Peugeot 306. Since then, he has competed regularly in the French GT Championship, driving cars such as a Porsche 996, a Chrysler Viper, and most recently a Corvette C5 in 2008. In 2001, he drove in six rounds of the FIA GT Championship in a Porsche 911 for Haberthur Racing. The team got just three points in the N-GT Class. He made a brief return to touring cars in 2008, entering two rounds of the FIA World Touring Car Championship at his home town of Pau. He drove for the Wiechers-Sport Team finishing sixteenth in race one, and retiring in race two. He did this again at the 2009 round at Pau, with a fourteenth and a retirement, scoring six points towards the independents championship.

== Racing record ==
=== Complete 24 Hours of Le Mans results ===
Year	Team	Co-Drivers	Car	Class	Laps	Pos.	Class Pos.
2002	(France) Auto Palace	(France) Guillaume Gomez (Japan) Ryo Fukuda	Ferrari 360 Modena GT	GT	119	DNF	DNF

=== Complete WTCC results ===
(key) (Races in bold indicate pole position) (Races in italics indicate fastest lap)

Year	Team	Car	1	2	3	4		5	6	7	8	9	10	11	12	Position	Points
2008	Wiechers-Sport	BMW 320si	CUR (Brazil)	PUE (Mexico)	VAL (Spain)	PAU (France)		BRN (Czech Republic)	EST (Portugal)	BRA (United Kingdom)	OSC (Germany)	IMO (Italy)	MON (Italy)	OKA (Japan)	MAC (Macau)	-	0
2008	Wiechers-Sport	BMW 320si				16	Ret									-	0
2009	Wiechers-Sport	BMW 320si	CUR (Brazil)	PUE (Mexico)	MAR (Morocco)	PAU (France)		VAL (Spain)	BRN (Czech Republic)	POR (Portugal)	BRA (United Kingdom)	OSC (Germany)	IMO (Italy)	OKA (Japan)	MAC (Macau)	31st	0
2009	Wiechers-Sport	BMW 320si				Ret	14									31st	0

=== Complete GT1 World Championship results ===
Year	Team	Car	1	2	3	4	5	6	7	8	9	10	11	12	13	14	15	16	17	18	19	20	Pos	Points
2010	Mad-Croc Racing	Corvette	ABU; QR	ABU; CR	SIL; QR	SIL; CR	BRN; QR	BRN; CR	PRI; QR	PRI; CR	SPA; QR	SPA; CR	NÜR; QR	NÜR; CR	ALG; QR; 17	ALG; CR; 16	NAV; QR	NAV; CR	INT; QR	INT; CR	SAN; QR	SAN; CR	56th	0
