= Wiechers-Sport =

Auto racing team in Nienburg, Germany

(Germany) Wiechers-Sport
- Founded: 1999
- Team principal(s): Dieter Wiechers; Thomas Nickel
- Current series: WTCC
- Former series: ETCC
- Noted drivers: 73. Fredy Barth
- Drivers' Championships: 2005 Ind. WTCC (Hennerici); 2007 Ind. WTCC (D'Aste)

Wiechers-Sport is a German auto racing team which is based in Nienburg. The team was first established in 1999, competing in German touring cars. The team currently competes in the World Touring Car Championship.

== World Touring Car Championship ==
=== BMW 320i (E46) (2005–2006) ===
Since its inaugural year in 2005, they have entered cars in the FIA World Touring Car Championship as an independent team with BMWs. In that first year, Marc Hennerici won the Independents Trophy for the team.

European Alfa Challenge driver Emmet O'Brien tested for the team at Oschersleben in December 2005. In February 2006, O'Brien along with Diego Romanini were confirmed as the first two drivers for the 2006 season. The team would hope to switch to the new BMW 3 Series (E90) chassis before the end of the season. O'Brien left the team after the Race of Brazil having endured a difficult start to the year, preferring to search for a drive elsewhere.

=== BMW 320si (E90) (2007–2010) ===
In 2007, Italian driver Stefano D'Aste won the WTCC independents trophy again as a Wiechers-Sport driver.

For the 2008 season, a total of six drivers drove for the team in selected rounds including Olivier Tielemans, Duncan Huisman and Matthew Marsh.

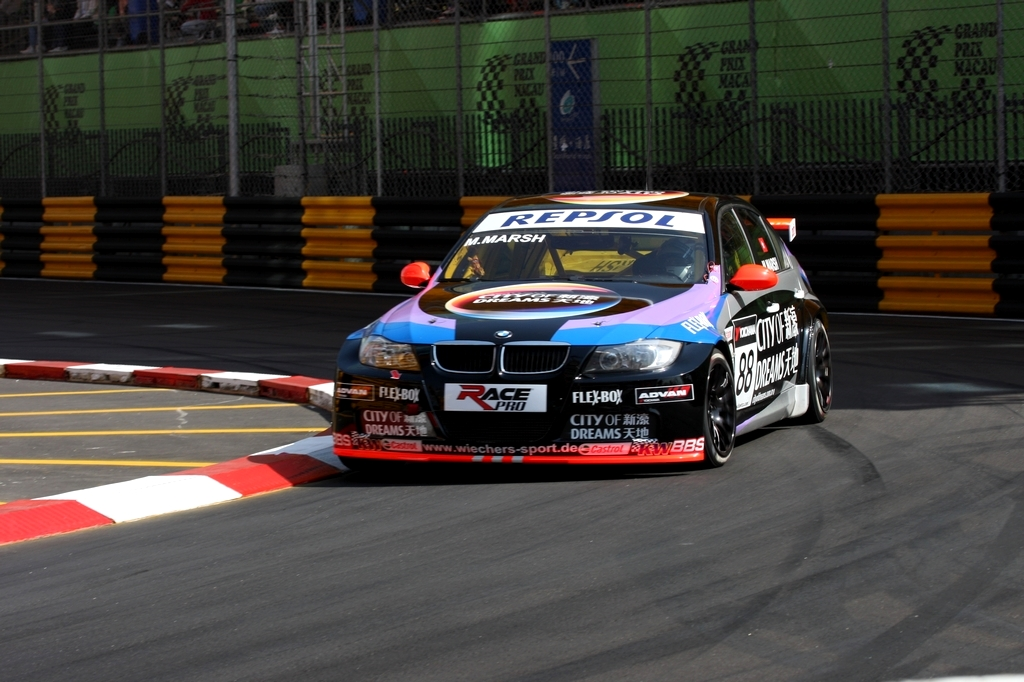
Matthew Marsh driving for Wiechers-Sport at the 2008 Race of Macau.

After a year at Proteam Motorsport, D'Aste returned to Wiechers-Sport for the 2009 season. D'Aste crashed out of the first race of the season at the Race of Brazil and finished 20th in the second race. He broke through into the top five of the Yokohama Drivers' Trophy at the second round. French GT Championship driver Laurent Cazenave joined Wiechers-Sport for the Race of France alongside D'Aste. D'Aste came close to securing the race two pole position at the Race of Spain after a battle with Sergio Hernández. The team did however go on to take the independents' victory in race two. D'Aste recorded two more independent victories at the Race of Portugal. The team scored their first points of the season at the Race of Germany when D'Aste finished seventh, this later became sixth when Nicola Larini was given 30–second penalty. D'Aste collided with Scuderia Proteam Motorsport driver Fabio Fabiani in free practice for the Race of Italy before going on to take the independents' pole position in qualifying and the independent victory in race two. Japanese driver Seiji Ara joined the team for the Race of Japan in a second car. Takayuki Aoki took over the second car for the Race of Macau season finale. D'Aste stopped on track during the first part of qualifying and on the narrow street circuit, Lada Sport driver James Thompson crashed into the stationary BMW. The extensive damage from the collision ruled D'Aste to sit out both races while Thompson was taken to hospital. This left Aoki is the team's only entry for the rest of the weekend, scoring a best result of sixteenth in race two. The team finished the season fourth in the Yokohama Teams' Trophy while D'Aste dropped to fourth in the drivers' trophy having missed the final round.

With D'Aste returning to Proteam, Mehdi Bennani joined the team as their main driver for the 2010 season. Bennani dropped for seventh to ninth on the last lap of race two at the Race of Morocco but still took the team's first independent victory of the season. Bennani originally finished tenth and took the independent victory in race one of the Race of Italy but after the race was given a 30-second penalty for cutting the first chicane on the opening lap, handing tenth place and a first Independents' Trophy victory to Harry Vaulkhard. He was then given a driver–through penalty in race two for jumping the start. The Race of UK saw Bennani black flagged in the second practice session for repeatedly exceeding the track limits before going on to have an eventful race two. He tapped Franz Engstler into a spin before later putting Darryl O'Young into the gravel. Benanni was penalised again after the second race of the Race of the Czech Republic having caused a collision. He was then one of twelve drivers to receive a post race 30–second penalty for breaking the speed limit during the rolling start at the team's home race in Germany. The team added an extra car for the Race of Japan to run local driver Masataka Yanagida. After the Race of Macau, Wiechers-Sport finished fifth in the teams' standings while Bennani also finished fifth in the independents' championship having been as high as third earlier on in the season.

=== BMW 320 TC (2011–) ===
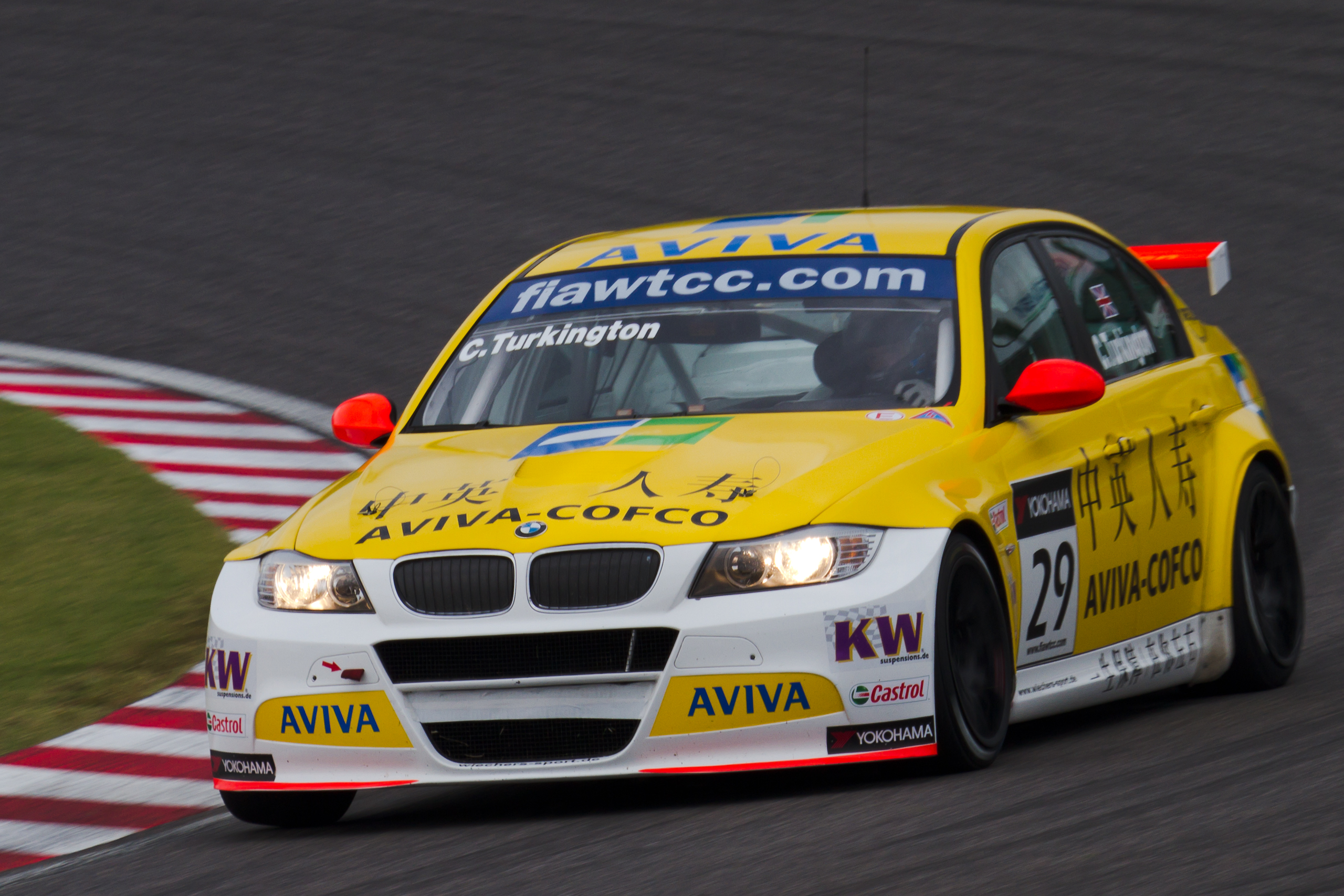
Colin Turkington driving for Wiechers-Sport at the 2011 FIA WTCC Race of Japan.

Wiechers switched to the BMW 320 TC for the 2011 season, using the new 1.6 litre turbocharged engine with former SEAT León Eurocup racer and WTCC debutant Urs Sonderegger at the wheel. The team started their season at the Race of Belgium after they tested the new car. Sonderegger sustained minor injuries in the second practice session for the Race of Hungary and missed the rest of the weekend. The team returned to action in the Czech Republic but Sonderegger left the team after the event having failed to be competitive, his replacement for the Race of Portugal was the team's former driver Stefano D'Aste. D'Aste finished tenth in the first part of qualifying to secure the reversed grid pole position on his return to the championship. D'Aste led three laps of race two before he started to drop down the field, eventually finishing eleventh. D'Aste was unavailable for the Race of UK due to commitments in the GT4 European Cup, his replacement for the round was Scandinavian Touring Car Championship driver Colin Turkington. Turkington was fifth in qualifying and therefore the quickest independent driver. The team then had an eventful first race as Turkington clashed with Tarquini at the Craner Curves and dropped down to tenth, he then managed to get back to ninth place before locking up on lap seven and rejoined the track in sixteenth place. He finished the first race in ninth place and then scored another point in race two to finish tenth. D'Aste returned for the Race of Germany where he took the independent victory in both races. Wiechers-Sport finished the season sixth in the teams' trophy and Turkington was their best placed driver in the overall drivers' championship in 13th place.

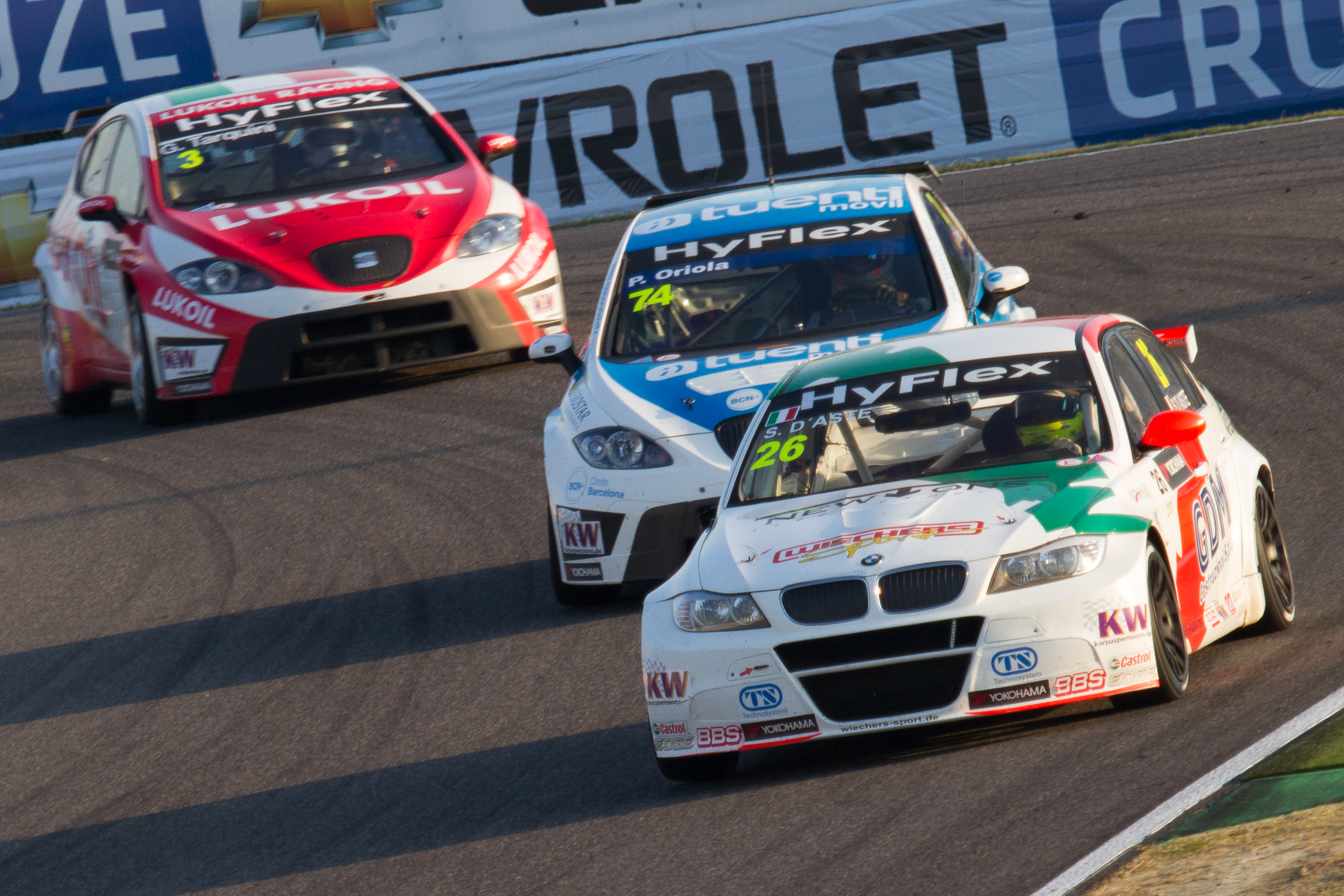
Stefano D'Aste took the team's first two overall victories in 2012.

The team returned for 2012 running a BMW for D'Aste. D'Aste finished fifth in race two of the season opener to take the independents' victory, he left the round at the top of the Yokohama Drivers' Trophy tied on points with Pepe Oriola and Alex MacDowall. D'Aste started from pole position for race two at the Race of Spain and led until lap seven until running wide allowing Alain Menu to take the lead. The leading pair then hit oil and D'Aste dropped down to his eventual finishing position of third. Despite his podium finish, D'Aste lost the lead of the independents' trophy to Tuenti Racing Team's Oriola. D'Aste started on the reversed grid pole again at the Race of Slovakia and maintained his lead at the start before running wide and losing places. During race two of the Race of Hungary, D'Aste spent the second half of the race behind the factory Chevrolet of Yvan Muller. D'Aste finished eighth after Muller ran wide on the final lap. D'Aste took his and the team's first win in race two of the Race of Austria in a race plagued with tyre issues. D'Aste was running fourth on the final lap when race leader Muller went off with the puncture. Robert Huff inherited the lead but then got a puncture at the final corner, second placed Tom Coronel tried to overtake up the inside while D'Aste pulled off a move around the outside to take the win. A last lap coming together with Franz Engstler in the first race at the Race of Brazil landed D'Aste with a 30–second penalty after the race, dropping his to seventeenth. He finished thirteenth in race two in what had been a difficult weekend for the team. The team had mixed fortunes at the Race of the United States, D'Aste was one of a number of drivers to be caught out by a first lap pileup in race one. He then started on pole position for race two before spinning out of the lead halfway around the first lap. D'Aste took his third reversed grid pole of the year at the Race of Japan and led from lights to flag to claim Wiechers–Sports' second win of the season. D'Aste claimed another podium result by finishing third at the Race of China in race one. He ran as high as second in race two and eventually took the independents' victory despite the BMW's drivers' door hanging loose. D'Aste was in with a chance of securing the independent drivers' title going into the final round of the season. He could only manage eleventh in qualifying while all his title rivals made it through to Q2. Race one saw the Yokohama Trophy rivals caught out by an incident at Lisboa on the first lap, D'Aste's car was damaged and he returned to the pits for repairs but his race was ended when he was issued with a black and orange flag. D'Aste ended the season third in the independent drivers' trophy while the team were the highest place single car entry in the teams' championship with sixth.

With the departure of D'Aste to his own team, Fredy Barth joined Wiechers–Sport for the 2013 season.

== Results ==
=== World Touring Car Championship ===
Year	Car	Drivers	Races	Wins	Poles	F.L.	Points	D.C.	T.C.
2005	BMW 320i	(Germany) Marc Hennerici	19	0	0	0	0	NC	3rd
2006	BMW 320i	(Italy) Diego Romanini	20	0	0	0	0	NC	4th
2006	BMW 320i	(Mexico) Oscar Hidalgo	2	0	0	0	0	NC	4th
2006	BMW 320i	(Republic of Ireland) Emmet O'Brien	10	0	0	0	0	NC	4th
2006	BMW 320i	(Czech Republic) Jan Vonka	2	0	0	0	0	NC	4th
2007	BMW 320si	(Italy) Stefano D'Aste	22	0	0	0	0	NC	2nd
2008	BMW 320si	(Netherlands) Olivier Tielemans	12	0	0	0	1	20th	4th
2008	BMW 320si	(Hong Kong) Matthew Marsh	4	0	0	0	1	21st	4th
2008	BMW 320si	(Netherlands) Duncan Huisman	2	0	0	0	0	24th	4th
2008	BMW 320si	(Denmark) Kristian Poulsen	2	0	0	0	0	29th	4th
2008	BMW 320si	(Japan) Takayuki Aoki	6	0	0	0	0	31st	4th
2008	BMW 320si	(France) Laurent Cazenave	2	0	0	0	0	33rd	4th
2009	BMW 320si	(Italy) Stefano D'Aste	21	0	0	0	3	18th	4th
2009	BMW 320si	(France) Laurent Cazenave	2	0	0	0	0	NC	4th
2009	BMW 320si	(Japan) Takayuki Aoki	2	0	0	0	0	NC	4th
2009	BMW 320si	(Japan) Seiji Ara	2	0	0	0	0	NC	4th
2010	BMW 320si	(Morocco) Mehdi Bennani	22	0	0	0	3	20th	5th
2010	BMW 320si	(Japan) Masataka Yanagida	2	0	0	0	0	NC	5th
2011	BMW 320 TC	(United Kingdom) Colin Turkington	2	0	0	0	46	13th	6th
2011	BMW 320 TC	(Italy) Stefano D'Aste	6	0	0	0	12	17th	6th
2011	BMW 320 TC	(Switzerland) Urs Sonderegger	6	0	0	0	0	NC	6th
2011	BMW 320 TC	(Canada) Gary Kwok	2	0	0	0	0	NC	6th
2012	BMW 320 TC	(Italy) Stefano D'Aste	24	2	0	0	144	7th	6th
