= Ibrahim Okyay =

Turkish racing driver

- Nationality: Turkish
- Born: 1 August 1969 (age 57) Istanbul (Turkey)

European Touring Car Cup career
- Debut season: 2010
- Current team: Texaco Team AMS
- Car number: TBA
- Starts: 8
- Wins: 0
- Poles: 0
- Fastest laps: 0
- Best finish: 4th in 2010

Previous series
- 2006, 08, 2011: WTCC

Championship titles
- 2007: Turkish Touring Car Championship

Ibrahim Okyay (born 1 August 1969) is a Turkish auto racing driver. He is best known for competing in the FIA World Touring Car Championship.

== Racing career ==
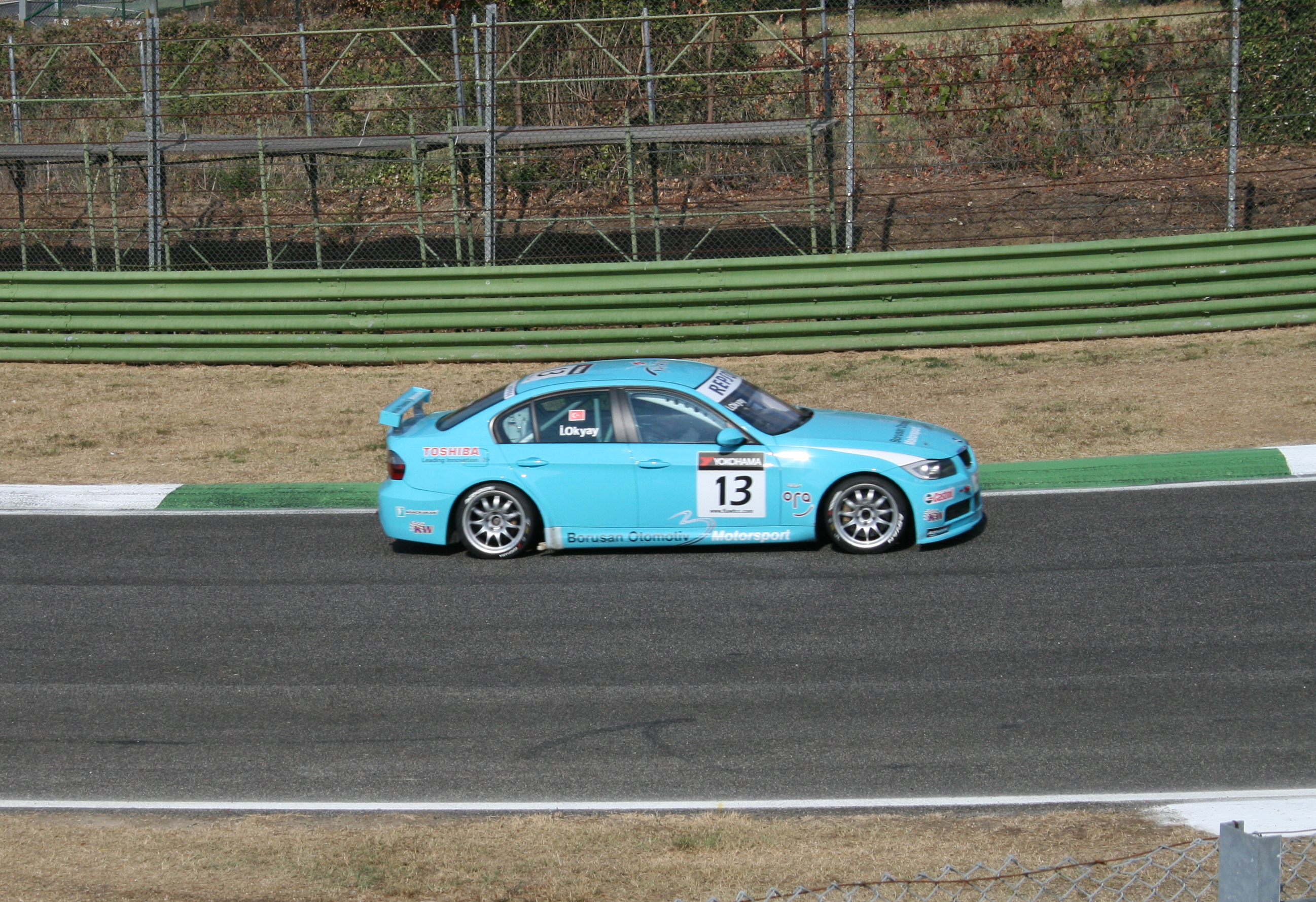
Okyay driving the Borusan Otomotiv Motorsport BMW 320si at Imola during the 2008 World Touring Car Championship season.

Okyay first entered the WTCC in 2006. He competed in just two races at his home circuit of Istanbul Park, driving an independent BMW 320i ran by Kosifler Motorsport. After winning the 2007 Turkish Touring Car Championship, he returned to the WTCC in 2008 for a full season this time driving a BMW 320si for Borusan Otomotiv Motorsport, finishing sixth in the Independents Trophy. He returned in 2011 for a limited season with the Borusan Otomotiv Motorsport team.

Okyay competed in the European Touring Car Cup with Borusan Otomotiv Motorsport in a BMW 320si in 2011.

Okyay competed in the GT4 European Series for Borusan Otomotiv.

Okyay currently competes in the TCR European Endurance for Texaco Team AMS.

== Racing record ==
=== Complete World Touring Car Championship results ===
(key) (Races in bold indicate pole position) (Races in italics indicate fastest lap)

Year	Team	Car	1	2	3	4	5	6	7	8	9	10	11	12	13	14	15	16	17	18	19	20	21	22	23	24	DC	Points
2006	Kosifler Motorsport	BMW 320i	ITA; 1	ITA; 2	FRA; 1	FRA; 2	GBR; 1	GBR; 2	GER; 1	GER; 2	BRA; 1	BRA; 2	MEX; 1	MEX; 2	CZE; 1	CZE; 2	TUR; 1; 19	TUR; 2; 14	ESP; 1	ESP; 2	MAC; 1	MAC; 2					NC	0
2008	Borusan Otomotiv Motorsport	BMW 320si	BRA; 1; 16	BRA; 2; 20	MEX; 1; 21	MEX; 2; 19	ESP; 1; 24	ESP; 2; 19	FRA; 1 Ret	FRA; 2 Ret	CZE; 1 Ret	CZE; 2; 19	POR; 1; 17	POR; 2; 23	GBR; 1; 18	GBR; 2 Ret	GER; 1; 19	GER; 2 Ret	EUR; 1 Ret	EUR; 2; 21	ITA; 1; 19	ITA; 2; 21	JPN; 1 Ret	JPN; 2 DNS	MAC; 1; 18	MAC; 2; 10	23rd	0
2011	Borusan Otomotiv Motorsport	BMW 320si	BRA; 1	BRA; 2	BEL; 1	BEL; 2	ITA; 1; 16	ITA; 2; 16	HUN; 1	HUN; 2	CZE; 1	CZE; 2	POR; 1	POR; 2	GBR; 1	GBR; 2	GER; 1; 18	GER; 2; 13	ESP; 1	ESP; 2	JPN; 1	JPN; 2	CHN; 1	CHN; 2	MAC; 1	MAC; 2	NC	0
