= Lada Sport =

Lada Sport LLC
- Native name: ООО ЛАДА Спорт
- Company type: Subsidiary
- Industry: Automotive
- Predecessor: AvtoVAZ motorsport division
- Founded: 21 March 2011
- Headquarters: Tolyatti, Samara Oblast, Russia
- Key people: Vladislav Mikhailovich Nezvankin (general manager)
- Products: Automobiles
- Revenue: ▼ ₽1,800.50 million (2022)
- Operating income: ▲ ₽3.31 million (2022)
- Net income: ▼ ₽-10.54 million (2022)
- Total assets: ▲ ₽1,179.45 million (2022)
- Total equity: ▼ ₽-111.66 million (2022)
- Parent: AvtoVAZ

(Russia) Lada Sport (team)
- Founded: 2009
- Current series: Russian Circuit Racing Series

Lada Sport is the Tolyatti-based performance and motorsport company for Lada-branded cars and a wholly owned subsidiary of AvtoVAZ.

== History ==
AvtoVAZ had a minor involvement in motorsport from the 1970s, producing racing cars for various series. In the 1990s, a small company called TMS produced sportier versions of street-legal Lada cars. The Lada Sport company was established in 2011, and the first performance-focused, street-legal Lada car it produced was 2011/2013 Granta Sport.

AvtoVAZ entered the World Touring Car Championship in the 2009 season by giving official support to the Russian Bears Motorsport team, branded as Lada Sport, and left at the end of the season. The team had already entered the previous season running a non-factory Lada 110. The Lada Sport company competed from 2013 to 2016 with WTCC-spec Grantas and later Vestas.

== Models produced ==
Since its establishment, Lada Sport produced, among others, the following models:

Car	Market introduction year	Type
Lada Granta Sport/Cup	2011/2013	Racing/street car
Lada Granta 1600T (WTCC)	2013	Racing car
Lada Granta TC1 (WTCC)	2014	Racing car
Lada Kalina Sport	2014	Street car
Lada Kalina NFR	2015	Street car
Lada Vesta TC1 (WTCC)	2015	Racing car
Lada Kalina NFR R1 (rally)	2016	Racing car
Lada Granta Drive Active	2016	Street car
Lada Kalina Drive Active	2016	Street car
Lada Vesta TCR (touring car racing)	2017	Racing car
Lada Granta R1 (rally)	2019	Racing car
Lada Vesta Sport	2019	Street car
Lada Niva Sport T2 I (rally raid)	2022	Racing car
Lada Vesta NG TCR (touring car racing)	2023	Racing car
Lada Vesta NG 1.6T (touring car racing)	2023	Racing car
Lada Niva Sport T2 II (rally raid)	2023	Racing car

== Complete World Touring Car Championship results ==
(key) (Races in bold indicate pole position) (Races in italics indicate fastest lap)

Year	Entrant	Car	No	Driver	1	2	3	4	5	6	7	8	9	10	11	12	13	14	15	16	17	18	19	20	21	22	23	24	DC	Points	TC	Points
2008	Russian Bears Motorsport	Lada 110 2.0	27	(Russia) Kirill Ladygin	BRA; 1	BRA; 2	MEX; 1	MEX; 2	ESP; 1	ESP; 2	FRA; 1	FRA; 2	CZE; 1	CZE; 2	POR; 1	POR; 2	GBR; 1	GBR; 2	GER; 1	GER; 2	EUR; 1 Ret	EUR; 2; 22	ITA; 1; 22	ITA; 2; 23	JPN; 1; 19	JPN; 2 Ret	MAC; 1 Ret	MAC; 2 Ret	–	0	6th*	46*
2008	Russian Bears Motorsport	Lada 110 2.0	28	(Russia) Viktor Shapovalov	BRA; 1	BRA; 2	MEX; 1	MEX; 2	ESP; 1; 20	ESP; 2 Ret	FRA; 1 DNQ	FRA; 2	CZE; 1 Ret	CZE; 2; 18	POR; 1 Ret	POR; 2; 24	GBR; 1; 19	GBR; 2; 20	GER; 1; 20	GER; 2; 23	EUR; 1 Ret	EUR; 2 DNS	ITA; 1 Ret	ITA; 2; 22	JPN; 1	JPN; 2	MAC; 1	MAC; 2	–	0	6th*	46*
2008	Russian Bears Motorsport	Lada 110 2.0	29	(Netherlands) Jaap Van Lagen	BRA; 1	BRA; 2	MEX; 1	MEX; 2	ESP; 1 Ret	ESP; 2 Ret	FRA; 1; 21	FRA; 2; 18	CZE; 1; 21	CZE; 2 Ret	POR; 1; 15	POR; 2; 21	GBR; 1 DNS	GBR; 2; 18	GER; 1; 14	GER; 2; 22	EUR; 1; 19	EUR; 2; 18	ITA; 1 Ret	ITA; 2; 19	JPN; 1; 18	JPN; 2; 17	MAC; 1; 21	MAC; 2 Ret	–	0	6th*	46*
2009	LADA Sport	LADA 110 2.0	18	(Netherlands) Jaap Van Lagen	BRA; 1; 17	BRA; 2; 17	MEX; 1; 17	MEX; 2; 17	MAR; 1; 20	MAR; 2; 14	FRA; 1 Ret	FRA; 2; 13	ESP; 1; 21	ESP; 2 Ret	CZE; 1; 14	CZE; 2; 18	POR; 1 Ret	POR; 2 DNS	GBR; 1 Ret	GBR; 2; 21									–	0	4th	83
2009	LADA Sport	LADA Priora	18	(Netherlands) Jaap Van Lagen																	GER; 1; 10	GER; 2; 20	ITA; 1 Ret	ITA; 2 DNS	JPN; 1; 13	JPN; 2 Ret	MAC; 1; 23	MAC; 2 DNS	–	0	4th	83
2009	LADA Sport	LADA 110 2.0	19	(Russia) Kirill Ladygin	BRA; 1; 14	BRA; 2; 22	MEX; 1; 18	MEX; 2; 20	MAR; 1; 17	MAR; 2; 11	FRA; 1 Ret	FRA; 2 Ret	ESP; 1 Ret	ESP; 2; 24	CZE; 1; 15	CZE; 2; 17	POR; 1; 19	POR; 2; 17	GBR; 1; 19	GBR; 2; 24									–	0	4th	83
2009	LADA Sport	LADA Priora	19	(Russia) Kirill Ladygin																	GER; 1; 16	GER; 2; 23	ITA; 1; 14	ITA; 2; 20	JPN; 1; 16	JPN; 2 DNS	MAC; 1 DNS	MAC; 2 DNS	–	0	4th	83
2009	LADA Sport	LADA 110 2.0	20	(Russia) Viktor Shapovalov	BRA; 1; 13	BRA; 2; 23	MEX; 1; 19	MEX; 2; 19	MAR; 1; 22	MAR; 2; 17	FRA; 1; 17	FRA; 2; 15	ESP; 1; 20	ESP; 2; 21	CZE; 1; 16	CZE; 2; 20	POR; 1	POR; 2	GBR; 1	GBR; 2									–	0	4th	83
2009	LADA Sport	LADA Priora	20	(Russia) Viktor Shapovalov																	GER; 1 Ret	GER; 2; 24	ITA; 1	ITA; 2	JPN; 1	JPN; 2	MAC; 1	MAC; 2	–	0	4th	83
2009	LADA Sport	LADA Priora	36	(United Kingdom) James Thompson	BRA; 1	BRA; 2	MEX; 1	MEX; 2	MAR; 1	MAR; 2	FRA; 1	FRA; 2	ESP; 1	ESP; 2	CZE; 1	CZE; 2	POR; 1; 18	POR; 2; 15	GBR; 1; 18	GBR; 2; 22	GER; 1	GER; 2	ITA; 1; 6	ITA; 2; 6	JPN; 1; 11	JPN; 2 Ret	MAC; 1 DNS	MAC; 2 DNS	17th	6	4th	83
2012	TMS Sport	Lada Granta WTCC	69	(United Kingdom) James Thompson	ITA; 1	ITA; 2	ESP; 1	ESP; 2	MAR; 1	MAR; 2	SVK; 1	SVK; 2	HUN; 1 Ret	HUN; 2 Ret	AUT; 1	AUT; 2	POR; 1; 17†	POR; 2; 11	BRA; 1	BRA; 2	USA; 1	USA; 2	JPN; 1	JPN; 2	CHN; 1	CHN; 2	MAC; 1	MAC; 2	–	0	–	0
2013	Lada Sport Lukoil	Lada Granta WTCC	8	(Russia) Mikhail Kozlovskiy	ITA; 1	ITA; 2	MAR; 1; 16	MAR; 2; 13	SVK; 1; 20	SVK; 2; 20	HUN; 1; 17	HUN; 2; 20	AUT; 1; 16	AUT; 2; 15	RUS; 1; 14	RUS; 2 Ret	POR; 1; 19	POR; 2; 19	ARG; 1 Ret	ARG; 2; 16	USA; 1; 19	USA; 2; 18	JPN; 1; 15	JPN; 2; 19	CHN; 1; 17	CHN; 2; 20	MAC; 1; 15	MAC; 2 Ret	–	0	**2nd**	**601**
2013	Lada Sport Lukoil	Lada Granta WTCC	10	(United Kingdom) James Thompson	ITA; 1 DNS	ITA; 2 DNS	MAR; 1; 10	MAR; 2 Ret	SVK; 1; 13	SVK; 2; 14	HUN; 1 Ret	HUN; 2; 12	AUT; 1; 9	AUT; 2; 12	RUS; 1; 5	RUS; 2 Ret	POR; 1; 6	POR; 2; 6	ARG; 1 Ret	ARG; 2; 20†	USA; 1; 14	USA; 2; 16	JPN; 1; 6	JPN; 2; 11	CHN; 1; 8	CHN; 2; 17	MAC; 1 Ret	MAC; 2 Ret	14th	41	**2nd**	**601**
2013	Lada Sport Lukoil	Lada Granta WTCC	11	(Russia) Aleksey Dudukalo	ITA; 1 DNS	ITA; 2 DNS	MAR; 1	MAR; 2	SVK; 1	SVK; 2	HUN; 1	HUN; 2	AUT; 1	AUT; 2	RUS; 1	RUS; 2	POR; 1	POR; 2	ARG; 1	ARG; 2	USA; 1	USA; 2	JPN; 1	JPN; 2	CHN; 1	CHN; 2	MAC; 1	MAC; 2	–	0	**2nd**	**601**
2014	Lada Sport Lukoil	Lada Granta 1.6T	11	(United Kingdom) James Thompson	MAR; 1; 10	MAR; 2 DNS	FRA; 1; 10	FRA; 2; 13	HUN; 1 DSQ	HUN; 2 DSQ	SVK; 1 DSQ	SVK; 2 C	AUT; 1; 13	AUT; 2 Ret	RUS; 1; 14	RUS; 2; 12	BEL; 1; 17	BEL; 2; 15	ARG; 1; 10	ARG; 2; 9	BEI; 1; 7	BEI; 2; 6	CHN; 1 Ret	CHN; 2; 10	JPN; 1; 13	JPN; 2; 12	MAC; 1; 11	MAC; 2; 9	15th	22	**3rd**	**425**
2014	Lada Sport Lukoil	Lada Granta 1.6T	12	(United Kingdom) Robert Huff	MAR; 1 Ret	MAR; 2 Ret	FRA; 1; 5	FRA; 2; 11	HUN; 1; 11	HUN; 2; 12	SVK; 1; 9	SVK; 2 C	AUT; 1; 12	AUT; 2 Ret	RUS; 1; 10	RUS; 2 Ret	BEL; 1; 16	BEL; 2; 13	ARG; 1; 7	**ARG**; **2**; 2	BEI; 1; 8	**BEI**; **2**; 1	CHN; 1; 15†	CHN; 2 Ret	JPN; 1; 12	JPN; 2; 11	MAC; 1; 9	MAC; 2; 1	10th	93	**3rd**	**425**
2014	Lada Sport Lukoil	Lada Granta 1.6T	14	(Russia) Mikhail Kozlovskiy	MAR; 1; 11	MAR; 2; 5	FRA; 1; 15	FRA; 2; 14	HUN; 1 Ret	HUN; 2 Ret	SVK; 1 Ret	SVK; 2 C	AUT; 1; 14	AUT; 2; 10	RUS; 1; 15	RUS; 2 Ret	BEL; 1; 14	BEL; 2; 12	ARG; 1; 14	ARG; 2; 11	BEI; 1; 11	BEI; 2 DNS	CHN; 1 Ret	CHN; 2; 11	JPN; 1; 14	JPN; 2; 13	MAC; 1; 13	MAC; 2 Ret	16th	11	**3rd**	**425**
2015	Lada Sport Rosneft	Lada Vesta WTCC	10	(Netherlands) Nick Catsburg	ARG; 1	ARG; 2	MAR; 1	MAR; 2	HUN; 1	HUN; 2	GER; 1	GER; 2	RUS; 1; 11	RUS; 2; 4	SVK; 1 Ret	SVK; 2 Ret	FRA; 1 Ret	FRA; 2; 12	POR; 1; 9	POR; 2; 6	JPN; 1 Ret	JPN; 2 Ret	CHN; 1; 4	CHN; 2 Ret	THA; 1 Ret	THA; 2 DNS	QAT; 1; 9	QAT; 2 Ret	12th	41	**3rd**	**360**
2015	Lada Sport Rosneft	Lada Vesta WTCC	12	(United Kingdom) Robert Huff	ARG; 1 Ret	ARG; 2 Ret	MAR; 1; 10	MAR; 2 Ret	HUN; 1; 9	HUN; 2 Ret	GER; 1 Ret	GER; 2; 7	RUS; 1; 4	RUS; 2; 2	SVK; 1; 4	SVK; 2 Ret	FRA; 1 Ret	FRA; 2 DNS	POR; 1; 10	POR; 2; 9	JPN; 1; 8	JPN; 2; 3	CHN; 1 Ret	CHN; 2; 5	THA; 1; 6	THA; 2; 6	QAT; 1; 12	QAT; 2 Ret	10th	103	**3rd**	**360**
2015	Lada Sport Rosneft	Lada Vesta WTCC	14	(Russia) Mikhail Kozlovskiy	ARG; 1	ARG; 2	MAR; 1; 12	MAR; 2 Ret	HUN; 1 Ret	HUN; 2 Ret	GER; 1	GER; 2	RUS; 1	RUS; 2	SVK; 1	SVK; 2	FRA; 1	FRA; 2	POR; 1	POR; 2	JPN; 1	JPN; 2	CHN; 1	CHN; 2	THA; 1	THA; 2	QAT; 1	QAT; 2	NC	0	**3rd**	**360**
2015	Lada Sport Rosneft	Lada Vesta WTCC	15	(United Kingdom) James Thompson	ARG; 1 NC	**ARG**; **2** Ret	MAR; 1; 11	MAR; 2; 7	HUN; 1 DNS	HUN; 2 DNS	GER; 1	GER; 2	RUS; 1	RUS; 2	SVK; 1	SVK; 2	FRA; 1	FRA; 2	POR; 1	POR; 2	JPN; 1	JPN; 2	CHN; 1	CHN; 2	THA; 1	THA; 2	QAT; 1	QAT; 2	17th	6	**3rd**	**360**
2015	Lada Sport Rosneft	Lada Vesta WTCC	46	(Netherlands) Jaap van Lagen	ARG; 1	ARG; 2	MAR; 1	MAR; 2	HUN; 1	HUN; 2	GER; 1; 11	GER; 2; 9	RUS; 1; 10	RUS; 2 Ret	SVK; 1 NC	**SVK**; **2**; 6	FRA; 1; 10	FRA; 2; 11	POR; 1; 8	POR; 2 Ret	JPN; 1	JPN; 2	CHN; 1	CHN; 2	THA; 1	THA; 2	QAT; 1	QAT; 2	15th	16	**3rd**	**360**
2015	Lada Sport Rosneft	Lada Vesta WTCC	47	(France) Nicolas Lapierre	ARG; 1	ARG; 2	MAR; 1	MAR; 2	HUN; 1	HUN; 2	GER; 1	GER; 2	RUS; 1	RUS; 2	SVK; 1	SVK; 2	FRA; 1	FRA; 2	POR; 1	POR; 2	JPN; 1; 11	JPN; 2; 8	CHN; 1 DSQ	CHN; 2; 9	THA; 1 Ret	THA; 2 DNS	QAT; 1; 10	QAT; 2; 10	16th	8	**3rd**	**360**
2016	Lada Sport Rosneft	Lada Vesta WTCC	2	(Italy) Gabriele Tarquini	FRA; 1 Ret	FRA; 2 Ret	SVK; 1; 4	SVK; 2; 13	HUN; 1; 5	HUN; 2 Ret	MAR; 1; 4	MAR; 2; 3	GER; 1; 7	GER; 2; 9	RUS; 1; 1	RUS; 2; 2	POR; 1; 12	POR; 2; 13	ARG; 1; 14	ARG; 2; 13	JPN; 1; 10	JPN; 2; 10	CHN; 1; 16†	CHN; 2; 5	QAT; 1; 1	QAT; 2; 7			9th	147	**3rd**	**536**
2016	Lada Sport Rosneft	Lada Vesta WTCC	7	(France) Hugo Valente	**FRA**; **1**; 5	FRA; 2; 7	**SVK**; **1**; 12	SVK; 2 Ret	HUN; 1; 6	HUN; 2; 9	MAR; 1 Ret	MAR; 2; 4	GER; 1; 6	GER; 2; 10	RUS; 1; 4	RUS; 2; 7	POR; 1 Ret	POR; 2; 9	ARG; 1 Ret	ARG; 2 Ret	JPN; 1 Ret	JPN; 2; 13	CHN; 1; 6	CHN; 2; 12	QAT; 1 Ret	QAT; 2 Ret			12th	78	**3rd**	**536**
2016	Lada Sport Rosneft	Lada Vesta WTCC	10	(Netherlands) Nick Catsburg	FRA; 1; 8	FRA; 2; 5	SVK; 1; 11	SVK; 2; 3	HUN; 1; 3	HUN; 2; 13	MAR; 1 Ret	MAR; 2; 7	GER; 1; 9	GER; 2; 6	RUS; 1; 2	**RUS**; **2**; 1	POR; 1; 3	POR; 2; 7	ARG; 1; 13	ARG; 2; 12	JPN; 1; 7	JPN; 2; 11	CHN; 1; 5	CHN; 2; 4	QAT; 1; 8	QAT; 2; 14			7th	175	**3rd**	**536**

^{*} 2008 in Yokohama Teams' Trophy

^{†} Driver did not finish the race, but was classified as he completed over 90% of the race distance.
