= 2009 FIA WTCC Race of Italy =

Race details
- Round 10 of 12 in the 2009 World Touring Car Championship at Autodromo Enzo e Dino Ferrari in Imola, Italy.
- Date: 20 September, 2009
- Location: Imola, Italy
- Course: Autodromo Enzo e Dino Ferrari; 4.909 kilometres (3.050 mi)

Race One
- Laps: 13
Pole position
Driver		(Italy) Gabriele Tarquini	SEAT Sport
Time		1:55.530	
Podium
First		(Italy) Gabriele Tarquini	SEAT Sport
Second		(France) Yvan Muller	SEAT Sport
Third		(United Kingdom) Rob Huff	Chevrolet
Fastest Lap
Driver		(Italy) Gabriele Tarquini	SEAT Sport
Time		1:57.580	

Race Two
- Laps: 11
Podium
First		(France) Yvan Muller	SEAT Sport
Second		(Italy) Gabriele Tarquini	SEAT Sport
Third		(Switzerland) Alain Menu	Chevrolet
Fastest Lap
Driver		(Sweden) Rickard Rydell	SEAT Sport
Time		1:57.458	

The 2009 FIA WTCC Race of Italy (formally the 2009 FIA WTCC Stihl Race of Italy) was the tenth round of the 2009 World Touring Car Championship season, and the fifth running of the FIA WTCC Race of Italy. It was held on 20 September 2009 at the Autodromo Enzo e Dino Ferrari near Imola, in Italy. It was the first time the Race of Italy was held at the circuit, although it had previously held races in 2005 and 2008, under the Race of San Marino and Race of Europe titles respectively. The races were won by SEAT Sport drivers Gabriele Tarquini and Yvan Muller who both finished second to their teammates in the other races.

== Background ==
Gabriele Tarquini arrived at his home race in Italy as the new championship leader, with a one-point lead over BMW Team Germany's Augusto Farfus. Previous series leader Yvan Muller was a further six points behind for SEAT.

There were 25 cars taking part at the event. Making his World Championship debut for Proteam was Fabio Fabiani, the reigning European Touring Car Cup champion in the Super Production class. Returning to the series after limited races in 2005 was Andrea Larini, younger brother of Chevrolet driver Nicola, in the SUNRED-run SEAT León Eurocup prize car.

James Thompson returned to the Lada Sport team, taking his Priora back off team principal Viktor Shapovalov, who stood in for Thompson in Germany due to commitments in V8 Supercar. Also returning was Mehdi Bennani and the Exagon Engineering team after missing the previous two rounds.

== Report ==
=== Free Practice ===
Championship leader Tarquini was fastest in the first practice session, ahead of BMW Team Italy-Spain's Alessandro Zanardi and Yvan Muller. Independent's Trophy leader Tom Coronel was fourth fastest ahead of Farfus and Sergio Hernández.

Jordi Gené was fastest in the second session for SEAT, ahead of teammate Rickard Rydell and BMW Team UK's Andy Priaulx. The session ended a couple of minutes early as the red flag was brought out after a collision between independent BMW drivers Stefano D'Aste and Fabio Fabiani, which left Fabiani stranded in the gravel.

=== Qualifying ===
The first session decided which ten drivers would make it through to the second session. Tarquini was fastest as all five SEAT drivers made it through to Q2. Only two BMW's made it through, with Farfus and Priaulx joined by all three Chevrolet drivers. D'Aste was the fastest independent in 14th, one place ahead of Thompson's Lada.

The second session determined the starting positions of the top ten. The five SEATs followed each other round to gain a slipstreaming benefit. Tarquini was the fastest of the train, ahead of Yvan Muller and Rydell. Rob Huff was fourth fastest for Chevrolet, ahead of SEAT driver Tiago Monteiro and Farfus. Priaulx, Gené and Chevrolet's Nicola Larini were seventh, eighth and ninth. The third Chevrolet driver Alain Menu did not take part in Q2 after his car returned to the pits at the end of Q1 spewing out oil. He was later given a ten-place grid penalty for an engine change.

=== Race One ===
Tarquini led from the start of the race until the finish, although it was a busy race for those behind him. Several front-runners were taken out of contention on the opening lap at the first Tamburello chicane. Jordi Gené triggered the accident when he hit Rob Huff's Chevrolet under breaking. Huff lost control and made contact with Rickard Rydell, who then hit his SEAT teammate Gené and then Augusto Farfus. Jörg Müller and Tiago Monteiro also suffered damage in the incident. All except Monteiro were able to make it to the pits and return to the action later in the race. Tarquini led from Yvan Muller, Huff, and Alex Zanardi. Tom Coronel and James Thompson were able to make up a host of places after avoiding the carnage by running through the gravel at the chicane, and finished in fifth and sixth. A train formed behind Thompson's Lada, and Stefano D'Aste ran off the track after out-breaking himself trying to pass Thompson. He made contact with Alain Menu's Chevrolet on rejoining the circuit, tipping D'Aste into a spin. Elsewhere, Kristian Poulsen tapped Jaap van Lagen into a spin, which resulted in van Lagen's Lada hitting a tyre wall and then flipping through the gravel trap, which brought out the safety car. Poulsen was then hit by teammate and team owner Franz Engstler. Andy Priaulx lost out in the fight for the eighth place, going off the circuit twice before eventually finishing fifteenth. Guest driver Andrea Larini was black-flagged for not wearing fire-proof underwear.

=== Race Two ===
Yvan Muller ended a run of poor results in race two by winning ahead of SEAT Sport teammate Tarquini. Muller had started seventh but he was able to pass race leader Menu on the third lap and led the rest of the way. Tarquini made contact with the Chevrolet car of Huff but remained on the tail of Muller. Tarquini fought for the lead but bumped into the back of Muller in trying to do so. Down the field, SEAT driver Gené attempted a pass on Hernández but misjudged it and spun the BMW. Fellow SEAT driver Monteiro also clipped another car, this time the SUNRED Engineering car of Tom Boardman. Monteiro went off the track as a consequence, cutting the corner at Rivazza and almost hitting Boardman as he rejoined the track. At the end Yvan Muller was first ahead of Tarquini and Menu while Thompson finished sixth in the Lada. Farfus was the final points scorer while D'Aste was the independents' trophy winner.

== Results ==
=== Qualifying ===
Pos.	No.	Name	Team	Car	C	Q1	Q2
1	2	(Italy) Gabriele Tarquini	SEAT Sport	SEAT León 2.0 TDI		1:56.139	1:55.320
2	1	(France) Yvan Muller	SEAT Sport	SEAT León 2.0 TDI		1:55.840	1:55.726
3	3	(Sweden) Rickard Rydell	SEAT Sport	SEAT León 2.0 TDI		1:55.847	1:55.891
4	11	(United Kingdom) Robert Huff	Chevrolet	Chevrolet Cruze LT		1:56.610	1:56.044
5	5	(Portugal) Tiago Monteiro	SEAT Sport	SEAT León 2.0 TDI		1:56.189	1:56.252
6	8	(Brazil) Augusto Farfus	BMW Team Germany	BMW 320si		1:56.393	1:56.257
7	6	(United Kingdom) Andy Priaulx	BMW Team UK	BMW 320si		1:56.873	1:56.283
8	4	(Spain) Jordi Gené	SEAT Sport	SEAT León 2.0 TDI		1:56.392	1:56.418
9	14	(Italy) Nicola Larini	Chevrolet	Chevrolet Cruze LT		1:56.704	1:56.522
10	12	(Switzerland) Alain Menu	Chevrolet	Chevrolet Cruze LT		1:56.972	no time set
11	10	(Spain) Sergio Hernández	BMW Team Italy-Spain	BMW 320si		1:57.026	
12	7	(Germany) Jörg Müller	BMW Team Germany	BMW 320si		1:57.121	
13	9	(Italy) Alessandro Zanardi	BMW Team Italy-Spain	BMW 320si		1:57.208	
14	27	(Italy) Stefano D'Aste	Wiechers-Sport	BMW 320si	Y	1:57.306	
15	36	(United Kingdom) James Thompson	Lada Sport	Lada Priora		1:57.331	
16	23	(Spain) Félix Porteiro	Scuderia Proteam Motorsport	BMW 320si	Y	1:57.419	
17	21	(Netherlands) Tom Coronel	SUNRED Engineering	SEAT León 2.0 TFSI	Y	1:57.472	
18	30	(Morocco) Mehdi Bennani	Exagon Engineering	SEAT León 2.0 TFSI	Y	1:57.787	
19	26	(Denmark) Kristian Poulsen	Liqui Moly Team Engstler	BMW 320si	Y	1:57.962	
20	25	(Germany) Franz Engstler	Liqui Moly Team Engstler	BMW 320si	Y	1:58.029	
21	22	(United Kingdom) Tom Boardman	SUNRED Engineering	SEAT León 2.0 TFSI	Y	1:58.170	
22	18	(Netherlands) Jaap van Lagen	Lada Sport	Lada Priora		1:58.388	
23	19	(Russia) Kirill Ladygin	Lada Sport	Lada Priora		1:58.990	
24	45	(Italy) Andrea Larini	SUNRED Engineering	SEAT León 2.0 TFSI	Y	1:59.056	
25	46	(Italy) Fabio Fabiani	Scuderia Proteam Motorsport	BMW 320si	Y	2:02.619	

=== Race 1 ===
Pos.	No.	Name	Team	Car	C	Laps	Time/Retired	Grid	Points
1	2	(Italy) **Gabriele Tarquini**	SEAT Sport	SEAT León 2.0 TDI		13	29:31.701	1	10
2	1	(France) Yvan Muller	SEAT Sport	SEAT León 2.0 TDI		13	+0.409	2	8
3	11	(United Kingdom) Robert Huff	Chevrolet	Chevrolet Cruze LT		13	+0.842	4	6
4	9	(Italy) Alessandro Zanardi	BMW Team Italy-Spain	BMW 320si		13	+1.457	12	5
5	21	(Netherlands) Tom Coronel	SUNRED Engineering	SEAT León 2.0 TFSI	Y	13	+3.501	16	4
6	36	(United Kingdom) James Thompson	Lada Sport	Lada Priora		13	+5.620	14	3
7	10	(Spain) Sergio Hernández	BMW Team Italy-Spain	BMW 320si		13	+6.002	10	2
8	12	(Switzerland) Alain Menu	Chevrolet	Chevrolet Cruze LT		13	+6.390	20	1
9	23	(Spain) Félix Porteiro	Scuderia Proteam Motorsport	BMW 320si	Y	13	+10.004	15	
10	22	(United Kingdom) Tom Boardman	SUNRED Engineering	SEAT León 2.0 TFSI	Y	13	+10.346	21	
11	25	(Germany) Franz Engstler	Liqui Moly Team Engstler	BMW 320si	Y	13	+10.819	19	
12	27	(Italy) Stefano D'Aste	Wiechers-Sport	BMW 320si	Y	13	+11.793	13	
13	30	(Morocco) Mehdi Bennani	Exagon Engineering	SEAT León 2.0 TFSI	Y	13	+12.329	17	
14	19	(Russia) Kirill Ladygin	Lada Sport	Lada Priora		13	+13.424	23	
15	6	(United Kingdom) Andy Priaulx	BMW Team UK	BMW 320si		13	+13.766	7	
16	26	(Denmark) Kristian Poulsen	Liqui Moly Team Engstler	BMW 320si	Y	13	+15.321	18	
17	46	(Italy) Fabio Fabiani	Scuderia Proteam Motorsport	BMW 320si	Y	13	+22.432	25	
Ret	18	(Netherlands) Jaap van Lagen	Lada Sport	Lada Priora		8	Race incident	22	
Ret	4	(Spain) Jordi Gené	SEAT Sport	SEAT León 2.0 TDI		7	Race incident	8	
Ret	7	(Germany) Jörg Müller	BMW Team Germany	BMW 320si		5	Race incident	11	
Ret	3	(Sweden) Rickard Rydell	SEAT Sport	SEAT León 2.0 TDI		5	Race incident	3	
Ret	8	(Brazil) Augusto Farfus	BMW Team Germany	BMW 320si		4	Race incident	6	
Ret	14	(Italy) Nicola Larini	Chevrolet	Chevrolet Cruze LT		3	Race incident	9	
Ret	5	(Portugal) Tiago Monteiro	SEAT Sport	SEAT León 2.0 TDI		0	Race incident	5	
DSQ	45	(Italy) Andrea Larini	SUNRED Engineering	SEAT León 2.0 TFSI	Y	7	Disqualified	24	

- **Bold** denotes Fastest lap.

=== Race 2 ===
Pos.	No.	Name	Team	Car	C	Laps	Time/Retired	Grid	Points
1	1	(France) Yvan Muller	SEAT Sport	SEAT León 2.0 TDI		11	21:51.680	7	10
2	2	(Italy) Gabriele Tarquini	SEAT Sport	SEAT León 2.0 TDI		11	+0.312	8	8
3	12	(Switzerland) Alain Menu	Chevrolet	Chevrolet Cruze LT		11	+4.008	1	6
4	9	(Italy) Alessandro Zanardi	BMW Team Italy-Spain	BMW 320si		11	+4.467	5	5
5	4	(Spain) Jordi Gené	SEAT Sport	SEAT León 2.0 TDI		11	+5.632	19	4
6	36	(United Kingdom) James Thompson	Lada Sport	Lada Priora		11	+7.190	3	3
7	3	(Sweden) **Rickard Rydell**	SEAT Sport	SEAT León 2.0 TDI		11	+7.612	21	2
8	8	(Brazil) Augusto Farfus	BMW Team Germany	BMW 320si		11	+8.327	22	1
9	6	(United Kingdom) Andy Priaulx	BMW Team UK	BMW 320si		11	+8.827	15	
10	27	(Italy) Stefano D'Aste	Wiechers-Sport	BMW 320si	Y	11	+9.499	12	
11	10	(Spain) Sergio Hernández	BMW Team Italy-Spain	BMW 320si		11	+12.380	2	
12	23	(Spain) Félix Porteiro	Scuderia Proteam Motorsport	BMW 320si	Y	11	+12.902	9	
13	25	(Germany) Franz Engstler	Liqui Moly Team Engstler	BMW 320si	Y	11	+13.390	11	
14	21	(Netherlands) Tom Coronel	SUNRED Engineering	SEAT León 2.0 TFSI	Y	11	+13.933	4	
15	7	(Germany) Jörg Müller	BMW Team Germany	BMW 320si		11	+14.351	20	
16	14	(Italy) Nicola Larini	Chevrolet	Chevrolet Cruze LT		11	+15.582	25	
17	11	(United Kingdom) Robert Huff	Chevrolet	Chevrolet Cruze LT		11	+19.759	6	
18	22	(United Kingdom) Tom Boardman	SUNRED Engineering	SEAT León 2.0 TFSI	Y	11	+30.537	10	
19	26	(Denmark) Kristian Poulsen	Liqui Moly Team Engstler	BMW 320si	Y	11	+32.926	24	
20	19	(Russia) Kirill Ladygin	Lada Sport	Lada Priora		11	+37.197	14	
21	45	(Italy) Andrea Larini	SUNRED Engineering	SEAT León 2.0 TFSI	Y	11	+37.198	18	
22	46	(Italy) Fabio Fabiani	Scuderia Proteam Motorsport	BMW 320si	Y	11	+1:24.989	16	
23	5	(Portugal) Tiago Monteiro	SEAT Sport	SEAT León 2.0 TDI		8	+3 Laps	23	
Ret	30	(Morocco) Mehdi Bennani	Exagon Engineering	SEAT León 2.0 TFSI	Y	6	Race incident	13	
DNS	18	(Netherlands) Jaap van Lagen	Lada Sport	Lada Priora		0	Did not start	17	

- **Bold** denotes Fastest lap.

== Standings after the race ==
Drivers' Championship standings

	Pos	Driver	Points
	1	(Italy) Gabriele Tarquini	109
1	2	(France) Yvan Muller	102
1	3	(Brazil) Augusto Farfus	91
	4	(United Kingdom) Andy Priaulx	66
	5	(Sweden) Rickard Rydell	63

Yokohama Independents' Trophy standings

Pos	Driver	Points
1	(Netherlands) Tom Coronel	195
2	(Spain) Félix Porteiro	166
3	(Germany) Franz Engstler	128
4	(Italy) Stefano D'Aste	127
5	(United Kingdom) Tom Boardman	77

Manufacturers' Championship standings

Pos	Manufacturer	Points
1	(Spain) SEAT	271
2	(Germany) BMW	250
3	(United States) Chevrolet	169
4	(Russia) Lada	78

- Note: Only the top five positions are included for both sets of drivers' standings.
