= Tom Boardman (racing driver) =

British racing driver (born 1983)

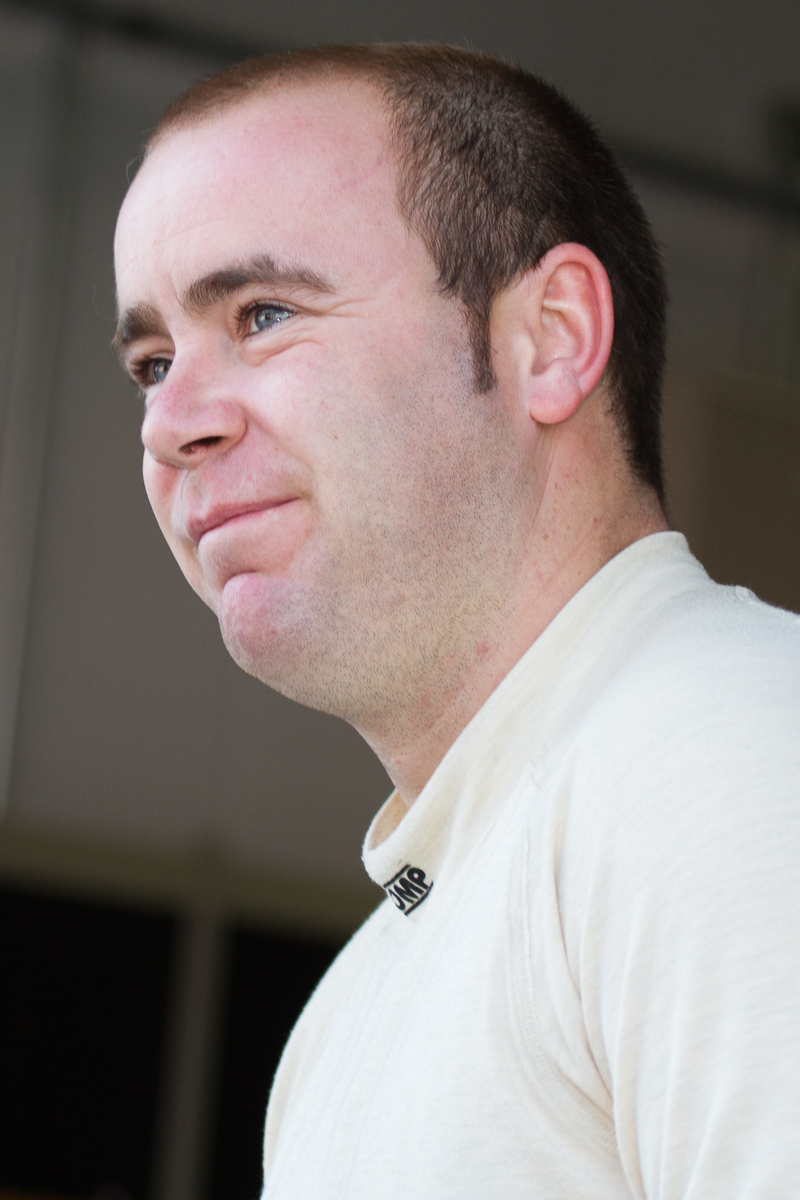
- Boardman at the 2012 FIA WTCC Race of Japan.
- Nationality: (United Kingdom) British
- Born: 15 October 1983 (age 43) Forton, Lancashire, England, UK
- Car number: 22
- Starts: 6
- Wins: 0
- Poles: 2
- Fastest laps: 2

Previous series
- 2008–10, 2012–13 2010–11 2008 2008 2006–08 2004–05, 2007 2001–03 2000 1999: WTCC; BTCC; SEAT León Eurocup; Copa de España Resistencia; SEAT León Supercopa; SEAT Cupra Championship; BTCC – Production; National Saloons; T Cars

Championship titles
- 2008 2005 1999: SEAT León Supercopa; SEAT Cupra Championship; T Cars

Tom Boardman (born 15 October 1983 in Forton, Lancashire) is a British auto racing driver. His greatest achievement to date is winning the 2005 SEAT Cupra Championship for the Triple R team which he runs with father, John, who was previously a rallycross driver in the 1970s. He competed in the World Touring Car Championship on and off between 2008 and 2013.

== Racing career ==
=== Early years ===
Boardman first started driving cars at a very young age on the farmland where his father's recovery business was based. After a chance visit to a local 1/4-mile oval track he and his dad were taken with the idea of entering a car and so Boardman's first experience of competitive motorsport was in 1993, in Ministox. Four seasons and four championships later, he moved on to autograss where he took two further championships in two seasons.

Building upon those early triumphs, Boardman stepped into the newly founded T-Car Series in 1999, where he dominated the competition by winning seven out of eight races and emerged as a rising star in motorsport.

In 2000, Boardman acquired a Peugeot 306 which, having waited patiently for his 16th birthday to comply with the rules, he entered in selected rounds of the National Saloons Championship. This was just one small step away from the British Touring Car Championship and his arrival on the scene at such a young age sparked many people to question whether or not he was too young.

=== British Touring Car Championship (2001–2002) ===
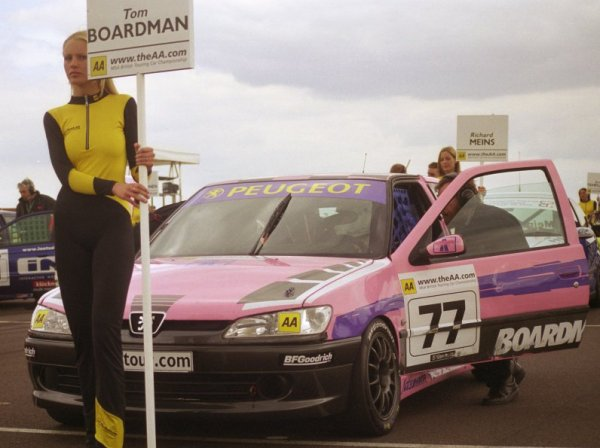
Boardman on the grid in 2001, his debut BTCC season.

Boardman would become the youngest driver in the history of the BTCC (a record he would hold until the following year when Tom Chilton made his debut) when he joined the Production Class of the 2001 Season with his family-run Tom Boardman Racing team.

The following season, Boardman joined Peter Briggs' Edenbridge Racing team, finishing sixth in the production class in a BMW (well behind team-mate Norman Simon), before joining John Batchelor's Team Varta in 2003. Both years were trying with 2002 seeing him struggle with rear wheel drive and his 2003 blighted by his teams mistakes towards the end of the season which meant that, despite winning more races than any other driver, he would finish only fourth in the final class positions.

Boardman has always looked to compete in a large variety of machinery and took to the rally stages towards the end of 2003, with some success, and this led to the formation of Special Tuning (UK) Ltd. He has also competed in the Renault Clio Winter Series with TCR and has tested a number of BTCC cars including the VLR Peugeot 307 and the Seat Leon.

=== SEAT Cupra and Triple R ===
A late deal saw Boardman enter the 2004 SEAT Cupra Challenge with backing from his father's Special Tuning operation. At this time, the series consisted of identical cars prepared by a single team and, despite a total lack of any pre-season testing, Boardman impressed many observers by shrugging off his previous reputation and demonstrating a new-found maturity. He would score a podium result first time out and a win at the second meeting. He was always up against it as many of the drivers were in their second season in the championship but he managed to stay in with a shout of championship victory right up to the final meeting of the year when a 'do or die' gamble on tyre choice saw him drop down to third position in the final standings.

2005 saw a rule change in the championship allowing independent teams to enter cars and the Boardman family, having enjoyed success on the rally stages, took the decision to reform the family team which had entered as Tom Boardman Racing back in 2001 and who had provided the infrastructure for the now defunct Team Varta operation. It was an impressive return to competition with Boardman taking the championship crown and a cheque for £100,000. The team would also run a second car for Jonathon Young for the second half of the season with Boardman taking on a 'mentor' role.

With the champion driver barred from returning to the championship, a strange situation engineered by Seat Sport UK, Boardman decided to concentrate on managing the team for 2006. Triple R would also enter a car in the Spanish series for Boardman himself to keep him 'match fit' and to give them experience of the new model that would not be used in the British championship until 2007. However, Boardman remained in the Spanish series for 2007.

For 2008, Boardman competed in the SEAT León Eurocup, and won the Spanish SEAT León Supercopa.

=== World Touring Car Championship (2008–2013) ===
==== SUNRED Engineering (2008–2010) ====
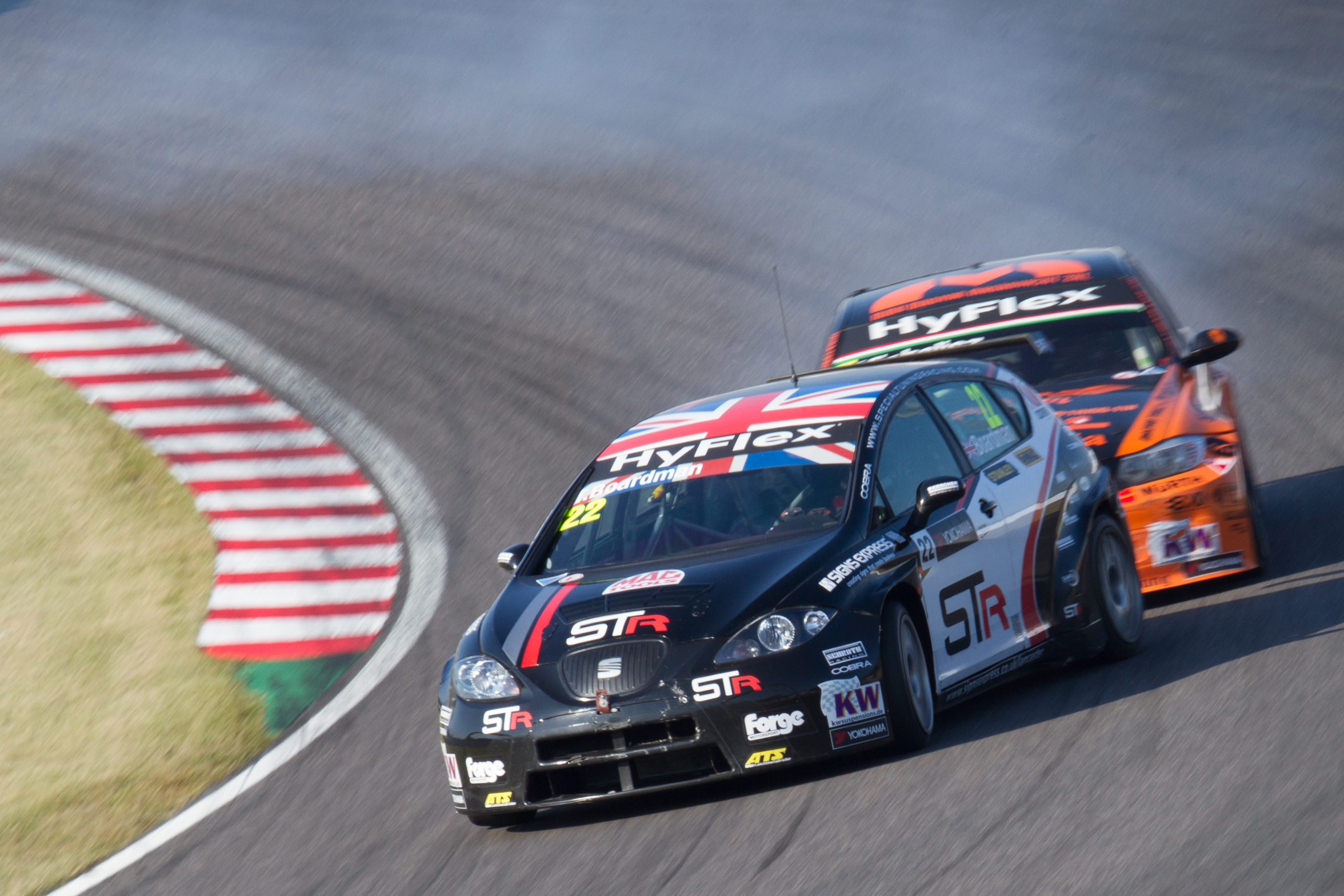
Boardman managed to hold off a charging Norbert Michelisz during Race 1 of the 2012 FIA WTCC Race of Japan.

Boardman made his World Touring Car Championship début in June at the Estoril round of the series as a reward for his performances in the Eurocup.

Boardman contested a full season in the WTCC for the SUNRED Engineering team in 2009. He finished fifth in the Independent's Trophy, taking one Independent win at the Race of UK. He contested his home round in 2010, for SUNRED Engineering.

==== Special Tuning Racing (2012–2013) ====
Boardman returned to the WTCC in 2012, driving for his own Special Tuning Racing team in a 1,600 cc (98 cu in) turbocharged SEAT León Mk2; the team's engines were supplied by SEAT Sport. Due to a shortage of parts, Boardman was forced to miss the first event of the season, the Race of Italy. With a shortage of new SEAT 1.6-litre turbo engines, STR elected to install the 2.0-litre TDI engine in Boardman's car until a new unit was available and he took part in the Race of Spain. Boardman finally switched to the turbo engine at the Race of Portugal. At the Race of China, he finished ninth in the race one provisional classification but along with four other drivers was issued with a 30-second penalty after the race, for missing a chicane to avoid a pileup. A late season improvement in form, including a double points finish at Macau, saw Boardman finish 17th in the drivers' standings.

Boardman stayed in the championship for the 2013 season, driving the sole car entered by STR for the season opening Race of Italy. He clashed with James Nash on the penultimate lap of the Race of Italy, breaking the steering arm on the SEAT and forcing Boardman to stop on the track. The race was completed with yellow flags in the second sector as Boardman's car was stranded on the racing line. Repairs meant he had to start from the pit lane for race two.

=== Back to the BTCC (2010–2011) ===
Boardman racing at the Croft Circuit in 2011

Boardman returned to the BTCC in 2010, racing for the family-run Special Tuning UK team sponsored by Club SEAT. Boardman continued in the BTCC in 2011, with the rebranded Special Tuning Racing team and took his first victory at Knockhill on Sunday 4 September, in the third race of the day. Special Tuning Racing confirmed plans to remain in the BTCC in 2012, with an option to move into the WTCC. The team later confirmed that Boardman would move back to the World Touring Car Championship, while the team left the BTCC.

Boardman made another brief return to the BTCC in 2018 with AMD Racing in an aging MG6 GT.

== Racing record ==
=== Complete British Touring Car Championship results ===
(key) Races in bold indicate pole position (1 point awarded – 2001–2002 all races, 2003–present just for first race, 2001–2003 in class) Races in italics indicate fastest lap (1 point awarded all races, 2001–2003 in class) * signifies that driver lead race for at least one lap (1 point given – 2001 just for feature race, 2003–present all races, 2001 for leading in class)

Year	Team	Car	Class	1	2	3	4	5	6	7	8	9	10	11	12	13	14	15	16	17	18	19	20	21	22	23	24	25	26	27	28	29	30	Pen.	Pos	Pts	Class
2001	Tom Boardman Racing	Peugeot 306 GTi	P	BRH; 1; 8†	BRH; 2 ovr:17 cls:11	THR; 1 Ret	THR; 2 ovr:10 cls:5	OUL; 1 ovr:10 cls:7	OUL; 2 ovr:8 cls:4	SIL; 1 Ret	SIL; 2 ovr:17 cls:10	MON; 1 ovr:12 cls:7	MON; 2 Ret	DON; 1 ovr:18 cls:11	DON; 2 Ret	KNO; 1 ovr:14 cls:9	KNO; 2 Ret	SNE; 1 ovr:15 cls:11	SNE; 2 ovr:13 cls:7	CRO; 1 DNS	CRO; 2 DNS	OUL; 1 ovr:16 cls:8	OUL; 2 ovr:18 cls:12	SIL; 1 ovr:7 cls:3	SIL; 2 Ret*	DON; 1 ovr:16 cls:8	DON; 2 ovr:12 cls:6	BRH; 1 ovr:14 cls:6	BRH; 2 ovr:11 cls:7						N/A	66	11th
2002	Edenbridge Racing	BMW 320i	P	BRH; 1 Ret	BRH; 2 ovr:10 cls:2	OUL; 1 WD	OUL; 2 WD	THR; 1 ovr:16 cls:2	THR; 2 ovr:17 cls:6	SIL; 1 Ret	SIL; 2 ovr:22 cls:8	MON; 1 ovr:12 cls:2	MON; 2 ovr:15 cls:4	CRO; 1 ovr:18 cls:8	CRO; 2 Ret	SNE; 1 ovr:19 cls:5	SNE; 2 ovr:13 cls:3	KNO; 1 ovr:20 cls:8	KNO; 2 ovr:22 cls:9	BRH; 1 ovr:16 cls:4	BRH; 2 Ret	DON; 1 ovr:17 cls:4	DON; 2 ovr:15 cls:6												N/A	98	6th
2003	Team Varta	Peugeot 307	P	MON; 1 Ret	MON; 2 Ret	BRH; 1 Ret	BRH; 2 DNS	**THR**; **1** ovr:12* cls:1	**THR**; **2** ovr:12* cls:1	SIL; 1 Ret	SIL; 2 ovr:15 cls:5	ROC; 1 ovr:13* cls:1	**ROC**; **2** DSQ	CRO; 1 ovr:14* cls:1	**CRO**; **2** Ret	SNE; 1 Ret	SNE; 2 ovr:13* cls:1	BRH; 1 Ret	BRH; 2 ovr:16* cls:1	DON; 1 Ret	DON; 2 DSQ	OUL; 1 Ret	OUL; 2 ovr:13* cls:1											−60	N/A	57	5th
2010	Special Tuning UK	SEAT León		THR; 1; 5	THR; 2; 16	THR; 3; 13	ROC; 1; 4	ROC; 2 Ret	ROC; 3; 10	BRH; 1; 9	BRH; 2; 6	BRH; 3; 8*	OUL; 1 Ret	OUL; 2; 8	OUL; 3 Ret*	CRO; 1; 12	CRO; 2; 6	CRO; 3; 6	SNE; 1; 8	SNE; 2 Ret	SNE; 3; 11	SIL; 1; 12	SIL; 2; 12	SIL; 3 Ret	KNO; 1 Ret	KNO; 2; 14	KNO; 3 Ret	DON; 1; 7	DON; 2; 13	DON; 3 Ret	BRH; 1; 10	BRH; 2; 13	BRH; 3 Ret		13th	48	
2011	Special Tuning UK	SEAT León		BRH; 1 Ret	BRH; 2 Ret	BRH; 3; 10	DON; 1; 7	DON; 2 Ret	DON; 3 Ret	THR; 1; 5	THR; 2; 9	**THR**; **3**; 3	OUL; 1 Ret	OUL; 2 NC	OUL; 3; 5	CRO; 1; 10	CRO; 2 Ret	CRO; 3 Ret	SNE; 1 Ret	SNE; 2 DNS	SNE; 3 DNS	KNO; 1; 8	KNO; 2; 6	KNO; 3; 1*	ROC; 1; 8	ROC; 2 Ret	ROC; 3; 10	BRH; 1 Ret	BRH; 2; 11	BRH; 3; 9	SIL; 1 Ret	SIL; 2; 6	SIL; 3; 3		11th	76	
2018	AmD with AutoAid RCIB Insurance Racing	MG 6 GT		BRH; 1; 18	BRH; 2; 4	BRH; 3; 18	DON; 1; 16	DON; 2; 17	DON; 3 Ret	THR; 1 Ret	THR; 2; 22	THR; 3; 18	OUL; 1; 24	OUL; 2; 25	OUL; 3; 15	CRO; 1; 26	CRO; 2 Ret	CRO; 3; 23	SNE; 1	SNE; 2	SNE; 3	ROC; 1	ROC; 2	ROC; 3	KNO; 1	KNO; 2	KNO; 3	SIL; 1	SIL; 2	SIL; 3	BRH; 1	BRH; 2	BRH; 3		29th	14	

† Event with 2 races staged for the different classes.

=== Complete World Touring Car Championship results ===
(key) (Races in bold indicate pole position) (Races in italics indicate fastest lap)

Year	Team	Car	1	2	3	4	5	6	7	8	9	10	11	12	13	14	15	16	17	18	19	20	21	22	23	24	DC	Pts
2008	SUNRED Racing Development	SEAT León TFSI	BRA; 1	BRA; 2	MEX; 1	MEX; 2	ESP; 1	ESP; 2	FRA; 1	FRA; 2	CZE; 1	CZE; 2	POR; 1 Ret	POR; 2; 17	GBR; 1	GBR; 2	GER; 1	GER; 2	EUR; 1	EUR; 2	ITA; 1	ITA; 2	JPN; 1	JPN; 2	MAC; 1	MAC; 2	NC	0
2009	Sunred Engineering	SEAT León 2.0 TFSI	BRA; 1; 11	BRA; 2; 19	MEX; 1; 16	MEX; 2; 21	MAR; 1	MAR; 2	FRA; 1; 9	FRA; 2 Ret	ESP; 1; 17	ESP; 2; 19	CZE; 1; 13	CZE; 2; 19	POR; 1; 15	POR; 2 Ret	GBR; 1; 11	GBR; 2; 10	GER; 1; 9	GER; 2; 13	ITA; 1; 10	ITA; 2; 18	JPN; 1; 18	JPN; 2; 14	MAC; 1; 15	MAC; 2 Ret	NC	0
2010	Sunred Engineering	SEAT León 2.0 TFSI	BRA; 1	BRA; 2	MAR; 1	MAR; 2	ITA; 1	ITA; 2	BEL; 1	BEL; 2	POR; 1	POR; 2	GBR; 1; 13	GBR; 2 Ret	CZE; 1	CZE; 2	GER; 1	GER; 2	ESP; 1	ESP; 2	JPN; 1	JPN; 2	MAC; 1	MAC; 2			NC	0
2012	Special Tuning Racing	SEAT León TDI	ITA; 1	ITA; 2	ESP; 1; 20	ESP; 2 Ret	MAR; 1; 14	MAR; 2 DNS	SVK; 1; 8	SVK; 2; 11	HUN; 1 Ret	HUN; 2 DNS	AUT; 1; 18†	AUT; 2 DNS													17th	16
2012	Special Tuning Racing	SEAT León WTCC													POR; 1; 14	POR; 2 Ret	BRA; 1; 19†	BRA; 2; 12	USA; 1; 10	USA; 2; 8	JPN; 1; 12	JPN; 2; 12	CHN; 1; 12	CHN; 2; 8	MAC; 1; 10	MAC; 2; 9	17th	16
2013	Special Tuning Racing	SEAT León WTCC	ITA; 1; 18†	ITA; 2; 16	MAR; 1 DNS	MAR; 2 DNS	SVK; 1 Ret	SVK; 2; 18	HUN; 1 Ret	HUN; 2; 15	AUT; 1	AUT; 2	RUS; 1	RUS; 2	POR; 1; 20†	POR; 2 DNS	ARG; 1	ARG; 2	USA; 1; 21	USA; 2; 22†	JPN; 1; 25†	JPN; 2 Ret	CHN; 1; 9	CHN; 2; 11	MAC; 1; 9	MAC; 2 Ret	22nd	4

^{†} Driver did not finish the race, but was classified as he completed over 75% of the race distance.

=== Complete TCR International Series results ===
(key) (Races in bold indicate pole position) (Races in italics indicate fastest lap)

Year	Team	Car	1	2	3	4	5	6	7	8	9	10	11	12	13	14	15	16	17	18	19	20	21	22	DC	Points
2015	Proteam Racing	Ford Focus ST	SEP; 1	SEP; 2	SHA; 1	SHA; 2	VAL; 1	VAL; 2	ALG; 1	ALG; 2	MNZ; 1; 10	MNZ; 2 Ret	SAL; 1	SAL; 2	SOC; 1	SOC; 2	RBR; 1	RBR; 2	MRN; 1	MRN; 2	CHA; 1	CHA; 2	MAC; 1	MAC; 2	42nd	1

Sporting positions
Preceded by James Pickford	SEAT Cupra Championship; 2005	Succeeded by Mat Jackson
