= 2009 FIA WTCC Race of Germany =

Race details
- Round 9 of 12 in the 2009 World Touring Car Championship at Motorsport Arena Oschersleben in Oschersleben, Germany.
- Date: 6 September, 2009
- Location: Oschersleben, Germany
- Course: Motorsport Arena Oschersleben; 3.696 kilometres (2.297 mi)

Race One
- Laps: 14
Pole position
Driver		(Italy) Gabriele Tarquini	SEAT Sport
Time		1:41.478	
Podium
First		(United Kingdom) Andy Priaulx	BMW Team UK
Second		(Italy) Gabriele Tarquini	SEAT Sport
Third		(Sweden) Rickard Rydell	SEAT Sport
Fastest Lap
Driver		(United Kingdom) Andy Priaulx	BMW Team UK
Time		1:36.754	

Race Two
- Laps: 14
Podium
First		(Brazil) Augusto Farfus	BMW Team Germany
Second		(United Kingdom) Andy Priaulx	BMW Team UK
Third		(Italy) Gabriele Tarquini	SEAT Sport
Fastest Lap
Driver		(United Kingdom) Andy Priaulx	BMW Team UK
Time		1:37.350	

The 2009 FIA WTCC Race of Germany was the ninth round of the 2009 World Touring Car Championship season, and the fifth running of the FIA WTCC Race of Germany. It was held on 6 September 2009 at the Motorsport Arena Oschersleben near Oschersleben, near Magdeburg in Germany. The races were won by BMW drivers Andy Priaulx and Augusto Farfus.

== Background ==
SEAT Sport driver Yvan Muller arrived at Oschersleben after a seven-week break with a five-point lead over teammate Gabriele Tarquini, with Augusto Farfus a further point behind.

A field of 27 cars made the trip to Oschersleben. Making their World Touring Car Championship debuts in Germany were reigning European Touring Car Cup champion Michel Nykjær for Perfection Racing in a Chevrolet Lacetti, and fellow Danish Touring Car Championship frontrunner Jason Watt in a privately run SEAT León. Driving the SUNRED Engineering guest car for SEAT León Eurocup drivers was Jean-Marie Clairet. Meanwhile, James Thompson missed the event as he prepared for the Phillip Island 500K V8 Supercar race. This meant that regular Lada Sport drivers Jaap van Lagen and Kirill Ladygin were driving the new Priora model for the first time along with team principal Viktor Shapovalov, who returned to driving duties.

== Report ==
=== Free Practice ===
The first free practice session took place on a damp track between 08:45 and 09:15 local time on Saturday 5, with BMW Team Germany's Augusto Farfus quickest with a time of 1:50.841. Chevrolet's Rob Huff was second ahead of SEAT Sport's Tiago Monteiro.

The second free practice session took place between 11:00 and 11:30 local time on a drying track, with Farfus quickest again with a time of 1:36.760. His teammate Jörg Müller was second, with Yvan Muller third for SEAT.

=== Qualifying ===
Qualifying began at 15:15 local time, and with rain falling after less than five minutes into the opening session. This meant that the top 10 drivers for the second session were effectively decided in the first two flying laps. Gabriele Tarquini was fastest and amongst those who joined him were Lada Sport driver Jaap van Lagen and independents Tom Coronel and Marin Čolak. Andy Priaulx and Yvan Muller were only 15th and 17th fastest.

Qualifying 2 began at 15:40. Augusto Farfus and Jörg Müller were initially quickest on wet tyres, but as the track dried those who gambled on slick tyres went much faster. Tarquini took the pole for SEAT with a time of 1:39.866. Čolak was second fastest, at his first event since the Czech Republic race. Rickard Rydell qualified third, ahead of the Lada of van Lagen, the first time he has driven the new Priora model.

Rob Huff and Kristian Poulsen were both given 10 place grid penalties. Huff was demoted from 6th to 16th after an engine change in his Chevrolet Cruze after Sunday morning warm up. Poulsen started from the back after ignoring yellow flag rules in Saturday's practice sessions.

=== Warm Up ===
Andy Priaulx was fastest in Sunday morning warm up, ahead of BMW teammates Jörg Müller and Augusto Farfus. The top three were separated by just 0.088 seconds. They were followed by the five SEAT Sport drivers.

=== Race One ===
Race one began shortly before 13:00 local time. At the first chicane Jörg Müller was spun round and hit by BMW Team Germany teammate Augusto Farfus, with Rob Huff and Jordi Gené also involved. Andy Priaulx moved from 14th to 4th during the first lap. He then passed Tom Coronel and Rickard Rydell before passing polesitter Gabriele Tarquini for the lead. From there he controlled the race, setting the fastest lap on his way to the win.

Behind Tarquni, Rydell and Independent class winner Coronel who finished second, third and fourth respectively, the main battle was for fifth. Lada Sport driver Jaap van Lagen was due to score the team's first points in fifth, having held off pressure from a convoy of Nicola Larini, Farfus and Stefano D'Aste. However, at the last corner van Lagen was hit from behind by the Chevrolet of Larini, sending the Lada into the gravel. Larini took fifth, narrowly ahead of Farfus at the line, while van Lagen could only rejoin and finish 11th. D'Aste scored his first points of the season in seventh, while fellow independent BMW driver Franz Engstler was set to start race two on pole position after finishing in eighth.

Tarquini took the lead of the championship after SEAT Sport teammate Yvan Muller broke his right front wheel and suspension after clipping the tyre stack on the inside of the first chicane having been passed for tenth by Farfus.

Larini was later given a 30-second penalty for the clash with van Lagen, which demoted him from fifth to fifteenth.

=== Race Two ===
Race two began at 15:08 local time. Front-row starting independents Engstler and D'Aste led Farfus for the first lap, but Farfus passed D'Aste for second at the start of the second lap before passing Engstler three laps later. Farfus remained in the lead until the finish. He was followed home by fellow BMW driver Priaulx, who had made up three places on the opening lap and passed Larini, D'Aste and Engstler to secure second place, scoring the fastest lap once again. A drive-through penalty for D'Aste and a mechanical failure for Engstler allowed Tarquini to score his second podium finish of the day, which means he left Germany leading the standings.

Jörg Müller and Sergio Hernández made their way up from further back on the grid to finish fourth and fifth ahead of Larini in sixth. Yvan Muller made his way up to seventh from a grid position of 21st. Coronel benefitted from the misfortunes of D'Aste and Engstler to take the independent class victory in eighth, with the Chevrolets of Rob Huff and Alain Menu rounding out the top 10.

== Results ==
=== Qualifying ===
Pos.	No.	Name	Team	Car	C	Q1	Q2
1	2	(Italy) Gabriele Tarquini	SEAT Sport	SEAT León 2.0 TDI		1:41.478	1:39.866
2	28	(Croatia) Marin Čolak	Čolak Racing Team Ingra	SEAT León 2.0 TFSI	Y	1:42.321	1:41.692
3	3	(Sweden) Rickard Rydell	SEAT Sport	SEAT León 2.0 TDI		1:42.073	1:42.192
4	18	(Netherlands) Jaap van Lagen	Lada Sport	Lada Priora		1:42.294	1:42.307
5	14	(Italy) Nicola Larini	Chevrolet	Chevrolet Cruze LT		1:41.804	1:43.626
6	11	(United Kingdom) Robert Huff	Chevrolet	Chevrolet Cruze LT		1:41.891	1:45.526
7	21	(Netherlands) Tom Coronel	SUNRED Engineering	SEAT León 2.0 TFSI	Y	1:41.490	1:46.104
8	7	(Germany) Jörg Müller	BMW Team Germany	BMW 320si		1:41.626	1:46.249
9	8	(Brazil) Augusto Farfus	BMW Team Germany	BMW 320si		1:41.629	1:46.481
10	9	(Italy) Alessandro Zanardi	BMW Team Italy-Spain	BMW 320si		1:42.916	1:47.667
11	10	(Spain) Sergio Hernández	BMW Team Italy-Spain	BMW 320si		1:43.034	
12	27	(Italy) Stefano D'Aste	Wiechers-Sport	BMW 320si	Y	1:43.108	
13	23	(Spain) Félix Porteiro	Scuderia Proteam Motorsport	BMW 320si	Y	1:43.140	
14	25	(Germany) Franz Engstler	Liqui Moly Team Engstler	BMW 320si	Y	1:43.183	
15	6	(United Kingdom) Andy Priaulx	BMW Team UK	BMW 320si		1:43.533	
16	22	(United Kingdom) Tom Boardman	SUNRED Engineering	SEAT León 2.0 TFSI	Y	1:43.987	
17	1	(France) Yvan Muller	SEAT Sport	SEAT León 2.0 TDI		1:44.198	
18	42	(Denmark) Michel Nykjær	Perfection Racing	Chevrolet Lacetti	Y	1:44.204	
19	12	(Switzerland) Alain Menu	Chevrolet	Chevrolet Cruze LT		1:44.259	
20	43	(Denmark) Jason Watt	Team Bygma Jason Watt Racing	SEAT León 2.0 TFSI	Y	1:44.273	
21	41	(France) Jean-Marie Clairet	SUNRED Engineering	SEAT León 2.0 TFSI	Y	1:44.407	
22	4	(Spain) Jordi Gené	SEAT Sport	SEAT León 2.0 TDI		1:44.705	
23	26	(Denmark) Kristian Poulsen	Liqui Moly Team Engstler	BMW 320si	Y	1:44.759	
24	38	(Germany) Philip Geipel	Liqui Moly Team Engstler	BMW 320si	Y	1:45.476	
25	20	(Russia) Viktor Shapovalov	Lada Sport	Lada Priora		1:45.521	
26	5	(Portugal) Tiago Monteiro	SEAT Sport	SEAT León 2.0 TDI		1:46.127	
107% time: 1:48.581
–	19	(Russia) Kirill Ladygin	Lada Sport	Lada Priora		1:48.959	

=== Race 1 ===
Pos.	No.	Name	Team	Car	C	Laps	Time/Retired	Grid	Points
1	6	(United Kingdom) **Andy Priaulx**	BMW Team UK	BMW 320si		14	22:52.547	14	10
2	2	(Italy) Gabriele Tarquini	SEAT Sport	SEAT León 2.0 TDI		14	+3.939	1	8
3	3	(Sweden) Rickard Rydell	SEAT Sport	SEAT León 2.0 TDI		14	+6.350	3	6
4	21	(Netherlands) Tom Coronel	SUNRED Engineering	SEAT León 2.0 TFSI	Y	14	+15.398	6	5
5	8	(Brazil) Augusto Farfus	BMW Team Germany	BMW 320si		14	+22.553	8	4
6	27	(Italy) Stefano D'Aste	Wiechers-Sport	BMW 320si	Y	14	+22.749	11	3
7	25	(Germany) Franz Engstler	Liqui Moly Team Engstler	BMW 320si	Y	14	+23.044	13	2
8	10	(Spain) Sergio Hernández	BMW Team Italy-Spain	BMW 320si		14	+23.392	10	1
9	22	(United Kingdom) Tom Boardman	SUNRED Engineering	SEAT León 2.0 TFSI	Y	14	+31.979	15	
10	18	(Netherlands) Jaap van Lagen	Lada Sport	Lada Priora		14	+32.059	4	
11	28	(Croatia) Marin Čolak	Čolak Racing Team Ingra	SEAT León 2.0 TFSI	Y	14	+33.376	2	
12	26	(Denmark) Kristian Poulsen	Liqui Moly Team Engstler	BMW 320si	Y	14	+33.596	27	
13	38	(Germany) Philip Geipel	Liqui Moly Team Engstler	BMW 320si	Y	14	+36.101	23	
14	41	(France) Jean-Marie Clairet	SUNRED Engineering	SEAT León 2.0 TFSI	Y	14	+36.557	21	
15	14	(Italy) Nicola Larini	Chevrolet	Chevrolet Cruze LT		14	+52.502†	5	
16	19	(Russia) Kirill Ladygin	Lada Sport	Lada Priora		14	+1:19.407	26	
17	9	(Italy) Alessandro Zanardi	BMW Team Italy-Spain	BMW 320si		13	+1 Lap	9	
18	12	(Switzerland) Alain Menu	Chevrolet	Chevrolet Cruze LT		12	+2 Laps	19	
19	5	(Portugal) Tiago Monteiro	SEAT Sport	SEAT León 2.0 TDI		11	+3 Laps	25	
Ret	42	(Denmark) Michel Nykjær	Perfection Racing	Chevrolet Lacetti	Y	7	Drive shaft	18	
Ret	1	(France) Yvan Muller	SEAT Sport	SEAT León 2.0 TDI		4	Race incident	17	
Ret	20	(Russia) Viktor Shapovalov	Lada Sport	Lada Priora		2	Gearbox	24	
Ret	4	(Spain) Jordi Gené	SEAT Sport	SEAT León 2.0 TDI		2	Race incident	22	
Ret	43	(Denmark) Jason Watt	Team Bygma Jason Watt Racing	SEAT León 2.0 TFSI	Y	0	Race incident	20	
Ret	23	(Spain) Félix Porteiro	Scuderia Proteam Motorsport	BMW 320si	Y	0	Race incident	12	
Ret	7	(Germany) Jörg Müller	BMW Team Germany	BMW 320si		0	Race incident	7	
Ret	11	(United Kingdom) Robert Huff	Chevrolet	Chevrolet Cruze LT		0	Race incident	16	

- **Bold** denotes Fastest lap.
- † Larini had originally finished 5th but was given a 30-second penalty for causing a collision with van Lagen and dropped to 15th.

=== Race 2 ===
Pos.	No.	Name	Team	Car	C	Laps	Time/Retired	Grid	Points
1	8	(Brazil) Augusto Farfus	BMW Team Germany	BMW 320si		14	22:58.530	3	10
2	6	(United Kingdom) **Andy Priaulx**	BMW Team UK	BMW 320si		14	+0.644	8	8
3	2	(Italy) Gabriele Tarquini	SEAT Sport	SEAT León 2.0 TDI		14	+5.177	7	6
4	7	(Germany) Jörg Müller	BMW Team Germany	BMW 320si		14	+7.976	23	5
5	10	(Spain) Sergio Hernández	BMW Team Italy-Spain	BMW 320si		14	+8.661	9	4
6	14	(Italy) Nicola Larini	Chevrolet	Chevrolet Cruze LT		14	+13.596	4	3
7	1	(France) Yvan Muller	SEAT Sport	SEAT León 2.0 TDI		14	+18.835	20	2
8	21	(Netherlands) Tom Coronel	SUNRED Engineering	SEAT León 2.0 TFSI	Y	14	+19.170	5	1
9	11	(United Kingdom) Robert Huff	Chevrolet	Chevrolet Cruze LT		14	+25.377	22	
10	12	(Switzerland) Alain Menu	Chevrolet	Chevrolet Cruze LT		14	+26.383	17	
11	3	(Sweden) Rickard Rydell	SEAT Sport	SEAT León 2.0 TDI		14	+26.787	6	
12	5	(Portugal) Tiago Monteiro	SEAT Sport	SEAT León 2.0 TDI		14	+29.148	18	
13	22	(United Kingdom) Tom Boardman	SUNRED Engineering	SEAT León 2.0 TFSI	Y	14	+29.413	10	
14	38	(Germany) Philip Geipel	Liqui Moly Team Engstler	BMW 320si	Y	14	+29.957	14	
15	23	(Spain) Félix Porteiro	Scuderia Proteam Motorsport	BMW 320si	Y	14	+33.380	24	
16	27	(Italy) Stefano D'Aste	Wiechers-Sport	BMW 320si	Y	14	+33.518	2	
17	41	(France) Jean-Marie Clairet	SUNRED Engineering	SEAT León 2.0 TFSI	Y	14	+33.609	15	
18	42	(Denmark) Michel Nykjær	Perfection Racing	Chevrolet Lacetti	Y	14	+35.008	19	
19	43	(Denmark) Jason Watt	Team Bygma Jason Watt Racing	SEAT León 2.0 TFSI	Y	14	+35.321	25	
20	18	(Netherlands) Jaap van Lagen	Lada Sport	Lada Priora		14	+36.193	11	
21	28	(Croatia) Marin Čolak	Čolak Racing Team Ingra	SEAT León 2.0 TFSI	Y	14	+40.624	12	
22	26	(Denmark) Kristian Poulsen	Liqui Moly Team Engstler	BMW 320si	Y	14	+55.944	13	
23	19	(Russia) Kirill Ladygin	Lada Sport	Lada Priora		12	+2 Laps	27	
24	20	(Russia) Viktor Shapovalov	Lada Sport	Lada Priora		10	+4 Laps	26	
Ret	25	(Germany) Franz Engstler	Liqui Moly Team Engstler	BMW 320si	Y	8	Drive shaft	1	
Ret	4	(Spain) Jordi Gené	SEAT Sport	SEAT León 2.0 TDI		3	Water leak	21	
Ret	9	(Italy) Alessandro Zanardi	BMW Team Italy-Spain	BMW 320si		3	Race incident	16	

- **Bold** denotes Fastest lap.

== Standings after the race ==
Drivers' Championship standings

	Pos	Driver	Points
1	1	(Italy) Gabriele Tarquini	91
1	2	(Brazil) Augusto Farfus	90
2	3	(France) Yvan Muller	84
1	4	(United Kingdom) Andy Priaulx	66
1	5	(Sweden) Rickard Rydell	61

Yokohama Independents' Trophy standings

	Pos	Driver	Points
1	1	(Netherlands) Tom Coronel	168
1	2	(Spain) Félix Porteiro	150
	3	(Germany) Franz Engstler	116
	4	(Italy) Stefano D'Aste	111
	5	(United Kingdom) Tom Boardman	67

Manufacturers' Championship standings

Pos	Manufacturer	Points
1	(Spain) SEAT	235
2	(Germany) BMW	234
3	(United States) Chevrolet	159
4	(Russia) Lada	68

- Note: Only the top five positions are included for both sets of drivers' standings.
