= 2009 Guia Race of Macau =

Race details
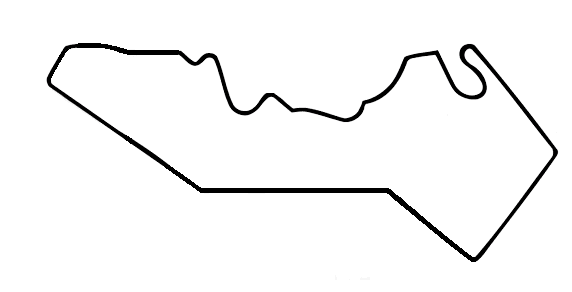
- Round 12 of 12 in the 2009 World Touring Car Championship at Guia Circuit in Macau.
- Date: 22 November, 2009
- Location: Macau
- Course: Guia Circuit; 6.117 kilometres (3.801 mi)

Race One
- Laps: 9
Pole position
Driver		(United Kingdom) Robert Huff	Chevrolet
Time		2:32.141	
Podium
First		(United Kingdom) Robert Huff	Chevrolet
Second		(Italy) Gabriele Tarquini	SEAT Sport
Third		(Spain) Jordi Gené	SEAT Sport
Fastest Lap
Driver		(Portugal) Tiago Monteiro	SEAT Sport
Time		2:32.076	

Race Two
- Laps: 7
Podium
First		(Brazil) Augusto Farfus	BMW Team Germany
Second		(Germany) Jörg Müller	BMW Team Germany
Third		(France) Yvan Muller	SEAT Sport
Fastest Lap
Driver		(Germany) Jörg Müller	BMW Team Germany
Time		2:32.671	

The 2009 Guia Race of Macau (formally the 2009 Marriott Guia Race of Macau) was the twelfth and final round of the 2009 World Touring Car Championship season. It was the fifth running of the Guia Race of Macau as a World Touring Car Championship round. It was held on 22 November 2009 on the temporary Guia Circuit around the streets of Macau. The race was part of the Macau Grand Prix weekend, headlined by the Formula Three event.

Race One was won by Chevrolet's Robert Huff, while BMW Team Germany driver Augusto Farfus won Race Two. SEAT Sport driver Gabriele Tarquini won the 2009 championship after finishing fifth in Race Two. SEAT beat BMW to the Manufacturer's title, and Tom Coronel won the Independent's Trophy.

== Background ==
Gabriele Tarquini went to Macau with a two-point lead over SEAT Sport teammate and reigning champion Yvan Muller. Thirteen points behind Tarquini was BMW Team Germany driver Augusto Farfus. In the Manufacturers' Championship, SEAT had a three-point lead over BMW. In the Independents' Trophy, Tom Coronel had a thirty-point advantage over Félix Porteiro, although double points were available for Independents in Macau in addition to the bonus points for a top-eight overall finish.

Five local drivers raced in Macau. Guia regular André Couto replaced João Paulo de Oliveira in the third SUNRED Engineering car. Liqui Moly Team Engstler ran five cars in Macau, with regulars Franz Engstler and Kristian Poulsen joined by Henry Ho, who raced for the team at the previous round in Japan, and series debutants Alex Liu and Joseph Rosa Merszei. Masaki Kano, who drove for the team in Japan, did not race in Macau. Lei Kit Meng made his debut in a BMW 320si run jointly by China Dragon Racing and RPM Racing Team. Also, Takayuki Aoki replaced fellow Japanese driver Seiji Ara in the second Wiechers-Sport car.

== Report ==
=== Testing and Free Practice ===
Augusto Farfus topped the test session on Thursday ahead of BMW Team Germany teammate Jörg Müller, ahead of Chevrolet's Rob Huff. The same three drivers filled the top three positions in the same order in the first practice session on Friday. Huff set the quickest time in the second session ahead of BMW Team UK driver Andy Priaulx, Müller and Farfus. The session was red-flagged in the final minutes of the session after Gabriele Tarquini crashed his SEAT.

=== Qualifying ===
Huff took pole position, ahead of Priaulx and Farfus. Championship rivals and SEAT Sport teammates Tarquini and Yvan Muller crashed in the second session that determines the starting order for the top ten positions. Muller lost control on cement dust that had been laid on the track following an earlier accident for James Thompson. Unsighted by the dust, Tarquini hit Muller's car, and the pair were then hit by Alain Menu. The three drivers lined up seventh, eighth and ninth, ahead of Rickard Rydell who suffered engine problems at the end of Q1.

Lada Sport teammate Thompson crashed into the abandoned Wiechers-Sport car of Stefano D'Aste during Q1. Thompson was taken to hospital and although he was later released he had suffered bruising to his feet, stopping him from competing in the races. He would not have been able to race anyway as his car was too badly damaged in the crash. D'Aste also missed the races as his car was also badly damaged, as did Thompson's teammate Kirill Ladygin who also crashed during qualifying. Muller and Tarquini were also taken to hospital following their accident, but both were cleared to race after their cars were repaired.

=== Race One ===
Rob Huff took a commanding victory for Chevrolet from pole position in the first race. His fellow front-row starter Andy Priaulx dropped back from the rolling start and ran wide at the first turn, hitting the wall. Tiago Monteiro moved up to second place, while Gabriele Tarquini made his way from seventh to third. On lap eight Monteiro slowed, teammate Tarquini passing him for second place. Jordi Gene finished third, ahead of Alain Menu. Monteiro also allowed title contender Yvan Muller through, before BMW drivers Augusto Farfus and Jörg Müller also dropped back to finish seventh and eighth, giving them a front-row start for Race Two.

Tom Coronel finished 13th overall, beating rival Felix Porteiro to the Independents' class victory.

=== Race Two ===
Farfus led away from pole position to win the final race of the season, while Tarquini took the 2009 title after finishing fifth. BMW Team Germany teammate Jörg Müller held off pressure from SEAT drivers Yvan Muller and Tiago Monteiro, while Tarquini had moved up to fifth position. A crash for Tom Boardman brought out the safety car on the third lap. The race was red-flagged at the end of lap eight after a major accident at the final turn involving Felix Porteiro, Franz Engstler and André Couto. Porteiro ran wide and hit the barriers, before being hit by Engstler. Engstler's car was left stranded in the middle of the track, where he was collected heavily by Couto. Engstler suffered a broken collarbone in the accident. The race was halted, and eventually it was decided that it would not be restarted.

As the results were taken from the end of lap seven, Porteiro was given the Independents' victory.

== Results ==
=== Qualifying ===
Pos.	No.	Name	Team	Car	C	Q1	Q2
1	11	(United Kingdom) Robert Huff	Chevrolet	Chevrolet Cruze LT		2:31.282	2:32.141
2	6	(United Kingdom) Andy Priaulx	BMW Team UK	BMW 320si		2:31.734	2:32.483
3	8	(Brazil) Augusto Farfus	BMW Team Germany	BMW 320si		2:31.505	2:33.033
4	4	(Spain) Jordi Gené	SEAT Sport	SEAT León 2.0 TDI		2:31.171	2:33.136
5	5	(Portugal) Tiago Monteiro	SEAT Sport	SEAT León 2.0 TDI		2:31.357	2:33.322
6	7	(Germany) Jörg Müller	BMW Team Germany	BMW 320si		2:31.724	2:34.091
7	2	(Italy) Gabriele Tarquini	SEAT Sport	SEAT León 2.0 TDI		2:31.150	no time set
8	1	(France) Yvan Muller	SEAT Sport	SEAT León 2.0 TDI		2:31.241	no time set
9	12	(Switzerland) Alain Menu	Chevrolet	Chevrolet Cruze LT		2:31.842	no time set
10	3	(Sweden) Rickard Rydell	SEAT Sport	SEAT León 2.0 TDI		2:31.859	no time set
11	9	(Italy) Alessandro Zanardi	BMW Team Italy-Spain	BMW 320si		2:32.059	
12	14	(Italy) Nicola Larini	Chevrolet	Chevrolet Cruze LT		2:32.181	
13	21	(Netherlands) Tom Coronel	SUNRED Engineering	SEAT León 2.0 TFSI	Y	2:32.330	
14	23	(Spain) Félix Porteiro	Scuderia Proteam Motorsport	BMW 320si	Y	2:33.581	
15	10	(Spain) Sergio Hernández	BMW Team Italy-Spain	BMW 320si		2:33.812	
16	66	(Macau) André Couto	SUNRED Engineering	SEAT León 2.0 TFSI	Y	2:34.047	
17	18	(Netherlands) Jaap van Lagen	Lada Sport	Lada Priora		2:34.214	
18	22	(United Kingdom) Tom Boardman	SUNRED Engineering	SEAT León 2.0 TFSI	Y	2:34.242	
19	25	(Germany) Franz Engstler	Liqui Moly Team Engstler	BMW 320si	Y	2:34.615	
20	36	(United Kingdom) James Thompson	Lada Sport	Lada Priora		2:36.141	
21	49	(Japan) Nobuteru Taniguchi	Scuderia Proteam Motorsport	BMW 320si	Y	2:36.431	
22	26	(Denmark) Kristian Poulsen	Liqui Moly Team Engstler	BMW 320si	Y	2:36.473	
23	52	(Japan) Takayuki Aoki	Wiechers-Sport	BMW 320si	Y	2:37.895	
24	51	(Macau) Henry Ho	Liqui Moly Team Engstler	BMW 320si	Y	2:41.318	
107% time: 2:41.730
–	55	(Macau) Joseph Rosa Merszei	Liqui Moly Team Engstler	BMW 320si	Y	2:42.626	
–	67	(Macau) Lei Kit Meng	China Dragon Racing	BMW 320si	Y	2:44.667	
–	53	(Macau) Alex Liu	Liqui Moly Team Engstler	BMW 320si	Y	2:47.747	
–	27	(Italy) Stefano D'Aste	Wiechers-Sport	BMW 320si	Y	13:18.881	
–	19	(Russia) Kirill Ladygin	Lada Sport	Lada Priora		no time set	

=== Race 1 ===
Pos.	No.	Name	Team	Car	C	Laps	Time/Retired	Grid	Points
1	11	(United Kingdom) Robert Huff	Chevrolet	Chevrolet Cruze LT		9	23:02.627	1	10
2	2	(Italy) Gabriele Tarquini	SEAT Sport	SEAT León 2.0 TDI		9	+7.952	7	8
3	4	(Spain) Jordi Gené	SEAT Sport	SEAT León 2.0 TDI		9	+8.996	4	6
4	12	(Switzerland) Alain Menu	Chevrolet	Chevrolet Cruze LT		9	+10.328	9	5
5	1	(France) Yvan Muller	SEAT Sport	SEAT León 2.0 TDI		9	+13.534	8	4
6	5	(Portugal) **Tiago Monteiro**	SEAT Sport	SEAT León 2.0 TDI		9	+15.517	5	3
7	7	(Germany) Jörg Müller	BMW Team Germany	BMW 320si		9	+15.782	6	2
8	8	(Brazil) Augusto Farfus	BMW Team Germany	BMW 320si		9	+15.967	3	1
9	9	(Italy) Alessandro Zanardi	BMW Team Italy-Spain	BMW 320si		9	+16.301	11	
10	10	(Spain) Sergio Hernández	BMW Team Italy-Spain	BMW 320si		9	+16.527	15	
11	3	(Sweden) Rickard Rydell	SEAT Sport	SEAT León 2.0 TDI		9	+16.618	10	
12	14	(Italy) Nicola Larini	Chevrolet	Chevrolet Cruze LT		9	+18.476	12	
13	21	(Netherlands) Tom Coronel	SUNRED Engineering	SEAT León 2.0 TFSI	Y	9	+21.356	13	
14	23	(Spain) Félix Porteiro	Scuderia Proteam Motorsport	BMW 320si	Y	9	+21.961	14	
15	22	(United Kingdom) Tom Boardman	SUNRED Engineering	SEAT León 2.0 TFSI	Y	9	+29.923	17	
16	25	(Germany) Franz Engstler	Liqui Moly Team Engstler	BMW 320si	Y	9	+30.468	18	
17	26	(Denmark) Kristian Poulsen	Liqui Moly Team Engstler	BMW 320si	Y	9	+44.647	20	
18	49	(Japan) Nobuteru Taniguchi	Scuderia Proteam Motorsport	BMW 320si	Y	9	+46.571	19	
19	52	(Japan) Takayuki Aoki	Wiechers-Sport	BMW 320si	Y	9	+56.298	21	
20	51	(Macau) Henry Ho	Liqui Moly Team Engstler	BMW 320si	Y	9	+1:23.908	22	
21	67	(Macau) Lei Kit Meng	China Dragon Racing	BMW 320si	Y	9	+2:02.061	25	
22	55	(Macau) Joseph Rosa Merszei	Liqui Moly Team Engstler	BMW 320si	Y	9	+2:02.321	24	
23	18	(Netherlands) Jaap van Lagen	Lada Sport	Lada Priora		7	+2 Laps	23	
24	53	(Macau) Alex Liu	Liqui Moly Team Engstler	BMW 320si	Y	7	+2 Laps	26	
25	66	(Macau) André Couto	SUNRED Engineering	SEAT León 2.0 TFSI	Y	7	+2 Laps	16	
NC	6	(United Kingdom) Andy Priaulx	BMW Team UK	BMW 320si		2	+7 Laps	2	
DNS	36	(United Kingdom) James Thompson	Lada Sport	Lada Priora		0	Injured	–	
DNS	27	(Italy) Stefano D'Aste	Wiechers-Sport	BMW 320si	Y	0	Accident damage	–	
DNS	19	(Russia) Kirill Ladygin	Lada Sport	Lada Priora		0	Accident damage	–	

- **Bold** denotes Fastest lap.

=== Race 2 ===
Pos.	No.	Name	Team	Car	C	Laps	Time/Retired	Grid	Points
1	8	(Brazil) Augusto Farfus	BMW Team Germany	BMW 320si		7	22:20.166	1	10
2	7	(Germany) Jörg Müller	BMW Team Germany	BMW 320si		7	+0.801	2	8
3	1	(France) Yvan Muller	SEAT Sport	SEAT León 2.0 TDI		7	+1.201	4	6
4	5	(Portugal) Tiago Monteiro	SEAT Sport	SEAT León 2.0 TDI		7	+1.980	3	5
5	2	(Italy) Gabriele Tarquini	SEAT Sport	SEAT León 2.0 TDI		7	+3.815	7	4
6	4	(Spain) Jordi Gené	SEAT Sport	SEAT León 2.0 TDI		7	+5.018	6	3
7	14	(Italy) Nicola Larini	Chevrolet	Chevrolet Cruze LT		7	+5.359	12	2
8	11	(United Kingdom) Robert Huff	Chevrolet	Chevrolet Cruze LT		7	+5.895	8	1
9	9	(Italy) Alessandro Zanardi	BMW Team Italy-Spain	BMW 320si		7	+6.167	9	
10	3	(Sweden) Rickard Rydell	SEAT Sport	SEAT León 2.0 TDI		7	+6.712	11	
11	10	(Spain) Sergio Hernández	BMW Team Italy-Spain	BMW 320si		7	+7.764	10	
12	23	(Spain) Félix Porteiro	Scuderia Proteam Motorsport	BMW 320si	Y	7	+8.290	14	
13	6	(United Kingdom) Andy Priaulx	BMW Team UK	BMW 320si		7	+8.583	24	
14	25	(Germany) Franz Engstler	Liqui Moly Team Engstler	BMW 320si	Y	7	+9.390	16	
15	49	(Japan) Nobuteru Taniguchi	Scuderia Proteam Motorsport	BMW 320si	Y	7	+10.635	18	
16	52	(Japan) Takayuki Aoki	Wiechers-Sport	BMW 320si	Y	7	+12.819	19	
17	51	(Macau) Henry Ho	Liqui Moly Team Engstler	BMW 320si	Y	7	+27.175	20	
18	66	(Macau) André Couto	SUNRED Engineering	SEAT León 2.0 TFSI	Y	7	+43.531	23	
19	67	(Macau) Lei Kit Meng	China Dragon Racing	BMW 320si	Y	7	+54.275	21	
20	55	(Macau) Joseph Rosa Merszei	Liqui Moly Team Engstler	BMW 320si	Y	7	+57.530	22	
21	12	(Switzerland) Alain Menu	Chevrolet	Chevrolet Cruze LT		5	+2 Laps	5	
Ret	21	(Netherlands) Tom Coronel	SUNRED Engineering	SEAT León 2.0 TFSI	Y	4	Race incident	13	
Ret	22	(United Kingdom) Tom Boardman	SUNRED Engineering	SEAT León 2.0 TFSI	Y	2	Race incident	15	
Ret	26	(Denmark) Kristian Poulsen	Liqui Moly Team Engstler	BMW 320si	Y	2	Race incident	17	
DNS	18	(Netherlands) Jaap van Lagen	Lada Sport	Lada Priora		0	Engine	25	
DNS	53	(Macau) Alex Liu	Liqui Moly Team Engstler	BMW 320si	Y	0	Gearbox	–	
DNS	36	(United Kingdom) James Thompson	Lada Sport	Lada Priora		0	Injured	–	
DNS	27	(Italy) Stefano D'Aste	Wiechers-Sport	BMW 320si	Y	0	Accident damage	–	
DNS	19	(Russia) Kirill Ladygin	Lada Sport	Lada Priora		0	Accident damage	–	

- **Bold** denotes Fastest lap.

== Standings after the event ==
Drivers' Championship standings

Pos	Driver	Points
1	(Italy) Gabriele Tarquini	127
2	(France) Yvan Muller	123
3	(Brazil) Augusto Farfus	113
4	(United Kingdom) Andy Priaulx	84
5	(United Kingdom) Robert Huff	80

Yokohama Independents' Trophy standings

	Pos	Driver	Points
	1	(Netherlands) Tom Coronel	233
	2	(Spain) Félix Porteiro	220
1	3	(Germany) Franz Engstler	158
1	4	(Italy) Stefano D'Aste	137
	5	(United Kingdom) Tom Boardman	99

Manufacturers' Championship standings

Pos	Manufacturer	Points
1	(Spain) SEAT	314
2	(Germany) BMW	311
3	(United States) Chevrolet	215
4	(Russia) Lada	83

- Note: Only the top five positions are included for both sets of drivers' standings.
