= Félix Porteiro =

Spanish racing driver (born 1983)

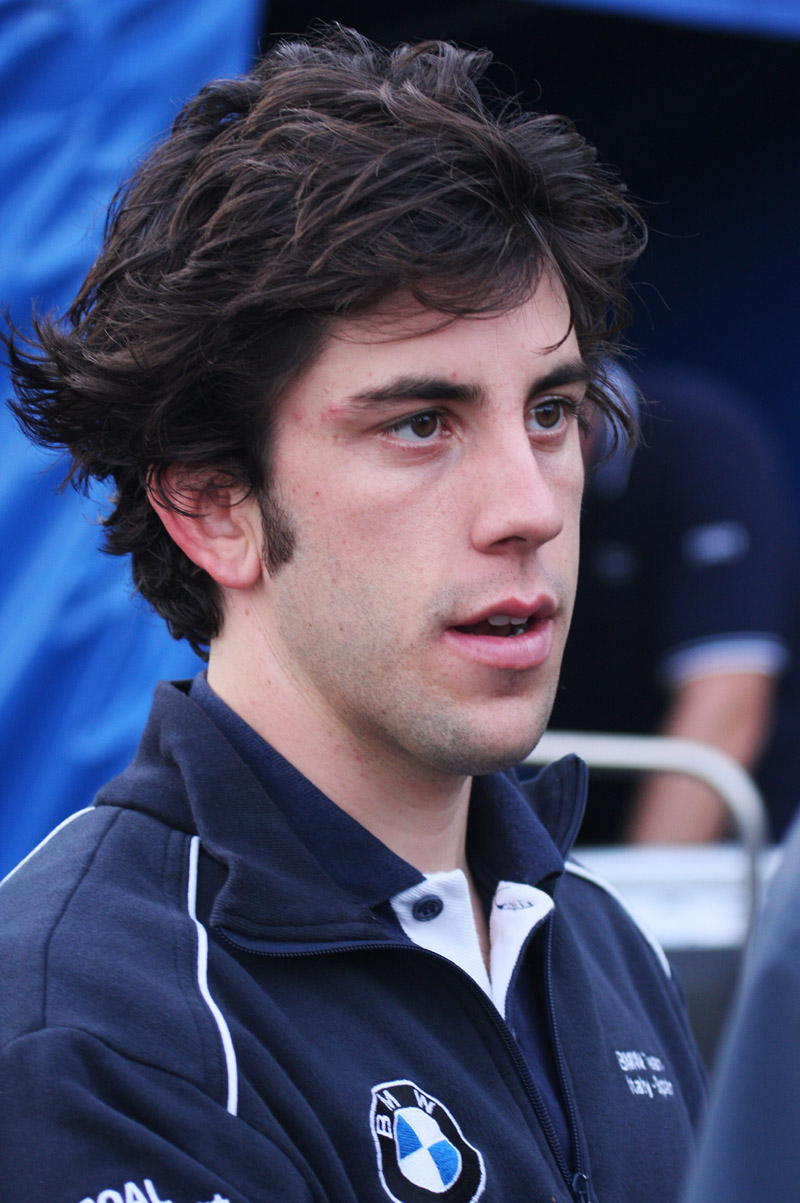
- Porteiro at the 2008 FIA WTCC Race of Japan.
- Nationality: (Spain) Spanish
- Born: 26 August 1983 (age 43) Castellón (Spain)
- Categorisation: FIA Platinum (until 2014); FIA Bronze (2022); FIA Silver (2023–)

Previous series
- 2007–09 2006 2006 2002–05 2001: WTCC; European Touring Car Cup; GP2 Series; WSN / WSR; Spanish Formula Three

Félix Porteiro Pérez (born 26 August 1983 in Castellón, Spain) is a Spanish former racing driver. He competed in GP2 Series in 2006, his best finish was 6th (was second on the road at Silverstone, but a steering rack irregularity caused him to be disqualified).

== Racing career ==
=== Single-seaters ===
In 2001, Porteiro drove in the Spanish Formula Three Championship, finishing fourth in the standings, with one win. In 2002 he began racing in the World Series by Nissan. He finished 18th in the standings in 2002, 14th in 2003 and seventh in 2004. He finished fifth in 2005, when the series became Formula Renault 3.5.

In 2006, Porteiro raced in the GP2 Series with Campos Racing, finishing 22nd in the standings.

=== Touring cars ===
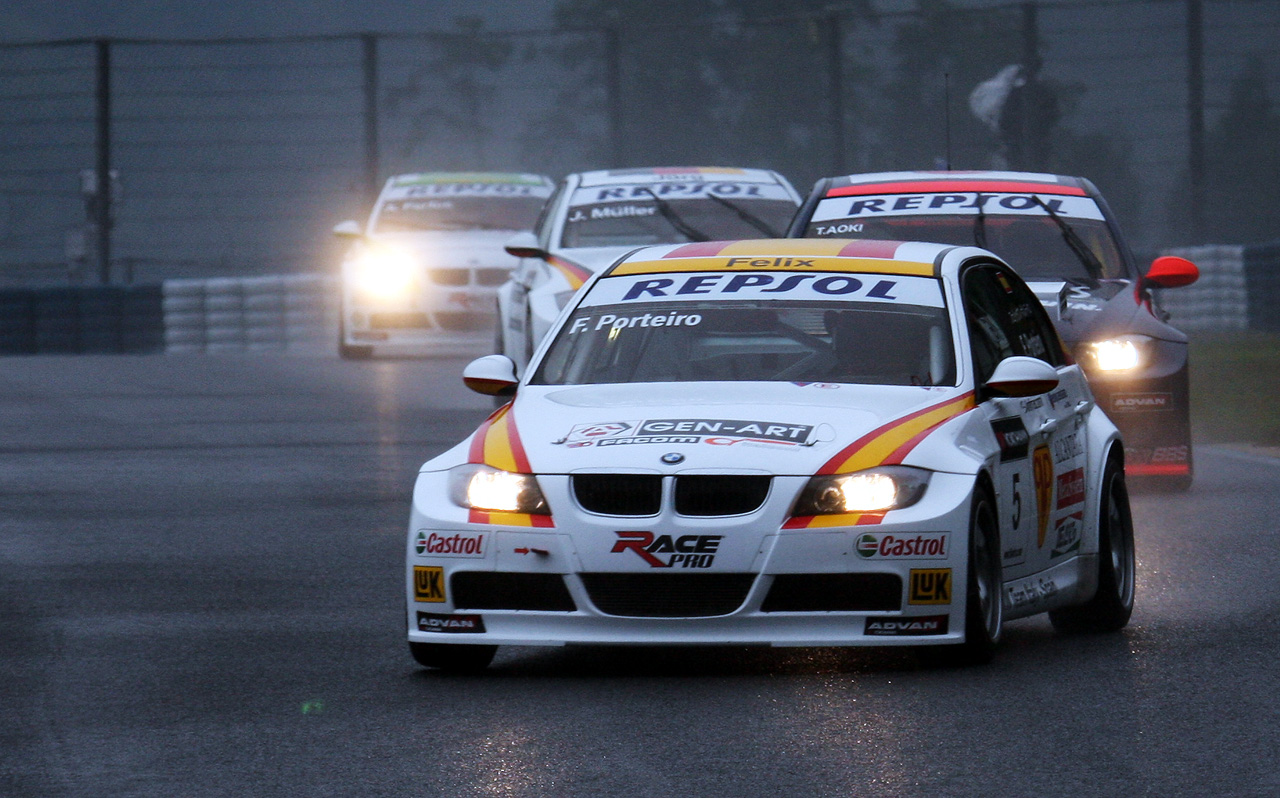
Porteiro driving the BMW 320si WTCC car at the 2008 WTCC Race of Japan in Okayama.

Porteiro made his touring car debut near the end of 2006, driving a BMW 320si for ROAL Motorsport at the European Touring Car Cup, finishing fifth. He impressed the team enough to earn a full-time drive in their World Touring Car Championship team, BMW Team Italy-Spain, in 2007. He scored his first ever win at Brno, and finished twelfth in the final standings. In 2008, he got his second win at Oschersleben, ending the year tenth overall.

For 2009, Porteiro was replaced by fellow Spaniard Sergio Hernández. Porteiro switched teams with him, moving to the independent Proteam Motorsport. He finished second in the Independent's Trophy.

Porteiro was left without a drive for the 2010 season, as Hernández returned to Proteam after ROAL's departure from the WTCC.

== Racing record ==
=== Career summary ===
Season	Series	Team	Races	Wins	Poles	F.Laps	Podiums	Points	Position
2000	Formula Super Toyota Spain	?	?	?	?	?	?	83	7th
2001	Spanish Formula Three Championship	Escuela Lois Circuit	12	1	2	0	5	131	4th
2002	World Series by Nissan	Vergani Racing	14	0	0	0	0	12	19th
2003	World Series by Nissan	KTR	17	0	0	0	1	26	14th
2004	World Series by Nissan	Porfesa Competicion	16	1	1	0	3	69	7th
2005	Formula Renault 3.5 Series	Epsilon Euskadi	17	2	4	2	3	77	5th
2006	GP2 Series	Campos Racing	21	0	0	0	0	5	22nd
2006	European Touring Car Cup	BMW Team Italy-Spain	2	0	0	0	1	6	5th
2007	FIA World Touring Car Championship	BMW Team Italy-Spain	22	1	1	0	3	32	12th
2008	FIA World Touring Car Championship	BMW Team Italy-Spain	23	1	0	1	4	51	10th
2009	FIA World Touring Car Championship	Scuderia Proteam Motorsport	24	0	0	0	0	10	15th
2009	FIA World Touring Car Championship - Independent's Trophy	Scuderia Proteam Motorsport	24	7	3	6	16	220	**2nd**
2012	Spanish GT Championship - GT Light	Porteiro Motorsport	6	0	?	?	3	14	5th

=== Complete Spanish Formula Three Championship results ===
(key) (Races in bold indicate pole position) (Races in italics indicate fastest lap)

Year	Entrant	1	2	3	4	5	6	7	8	9	10	11	12	13	14	DC	Points
2001	Escuela Lois Circuit	VAL; 1; 2	**VAL**; **2** DNS	JAR; 1; 10	JAR; 2; 3	EST; 1; 2	EST; 2; 1	ALB; 1; 5	**ALB**; **2**; 2	JAR; 1; 4	JAR; 2 C	VAL; 1 Ret	VAL; 2; 15	CAT; 1 Ret	CAT; 2; 10	4th	131

=== Complete World Series by Nissan/Formula Renault 3.5 Series results ===
(key) (Races in bold indicate pole position) (Races in italics indicate fastest lap)

Year	Entrant	1	2	3	4	5	6	7	8	9	10	11	12	13	14	15	16	17	18	DC	Points
2002	Vergani Racing	VAL; 1; 9	VAL; 2 Ret	JAR; 1; 6	JAR; 2; 11	ALB; 1 Ret	ALB; 2 Ret	MNZ; 1; 11	MNZ; 2; 10	MAG; 1; 13	MAG; 2 Ret	CAT; 1; 16	CAT; 2; 16	VAL; 1; 8	VAL; 2 Ret	CUR; 1	CUR; 2	INT; 1	INT; 2	19th	12
2003	KTR	JAR; 1 Ret	JAR; 2 DNS	ZOL; 1; 7	ZOL; 2 Ret	MAG; 1; 11	MAG; 2 Ret	MNZ; 1; 12	MNZ; 2; 11	LAU; 1; 13	LAU; 2; 7	A1R; 1; 12	A1R; 2; 11	CAT; 1; 10	CAT; 2 Ret	VAL; 1 Ret	VAL; 2; 2	JAR; 1; 9	JAR; 2; 11	14th	26
2004	Porfesa Competicion	JAR; 1; 13	JAR; 2; 12	ZOL; 1; 6	ZOL; 2; 9	MAG; 1 Ret	MAG; 2 Ret	VAL; 1; 3	VAL; 2; 6	LAU; 1; 6	LAU; 2; 4	EST; 1; 10	EST; 2; 3							8th	76
2004	Epsilon Euskadi													**CAT**; **1**; 1	CAT; 2; 6	VAL; 1; 8	VAL; 2; 3	JER; 1; 9	JER; 2; 6	8th	76
2005	Epsilon Euskadi	ZOL; 1; 5	ZOL; 2; 9	MON; 1 Ret	**VAL**; **1**; 1	VAL; 2 Ret	LMS; 1; 18	LMS; 2; 11	BIL; 1; 20	BIL; 2; 11	OSC; 1 Ret	OSC; 2; 9	DON; 1; 6	DON; 2 Ret	EST; 1; 5	**EST**; **2**; 1	**MNZ**; **1**; 2	**MNZ**; **2**; 4		5th	77

=== Complete GP2 Series results ===
(key) (Races in bold indicate pole position) (Races in italics indicate fastest lap)

Year	Entrant	1	2	3	4	5	6	7	8	9	10	11	12	13	14	15	16	17	18	19	20	21	DC	Points
2006	Campos Racing	VAL; FEA; Ret	VAL; SPR; Ret	IMO; FEA; 10	IMO; SPR; 6	NÜR; FEA; 16	NÜR; SPR; Ret	CAT; FEA; 17	CAT; SPR; Ret	MON; FEA; 6	SIL; FEA; 8	SIL; SPR; DSQ	MAG; FEA; 18	MAG; SPR; 10	HOC; FEA; 12	HOC; SPR; 18	HUN; FEA; Ret	HUN; SPR; 12	IST; FEA; 19^{†}	IST; SPR; Ret	MNZ; FEA; Ret	MNZ; SPR; NC	22nd	5

=== Complete World Touring Car Championship results ===
(key) (Races in bold indicate pole position) (Races in italics indicate fastest lap)

Year	Team	Car	1	2	3	4	5	6	7	8	9	10	11	12	13	14	15	16	17	18	19	20	21	22	23	24	DC	Points
2007	BMW Team Italy-Spain	BMW 320si	BRA; 1 Ret	BRA; 2 Ret	NED; 1; 11	NED; 2; 8	ESP; 1 Ret	ESP; 2; 19	FRA; 1; 5	FRA; 2 Ret	**CZE**; **1**; 1	CZE; 2; 3	POR; 1; 17	POR; 2; 18	SWE; 1; 14	SWE; 2; 16	GER; 1 Ret	GER; 2; 20	GBR; 1; 9	GBR; 2; 2	ITA; 1; 18	ITA; 2 Ret	MAC; 1; 12	MAC; 2; 7			12th	32
2008	BMW Team Italy-Spain	BMW 320si	BRA; 1; 6	BRA; 2; 3	MEX; 1; 16	MEX; 2; 20	ESP; 1; 22	ESP; 2; 10	FRA; 1; 15	FRA; 2; 12	CZE; 1; 2	CZE; 2; 4	POR; 1; 8	POR; 2; 4	GBR; 1; 6	GBR; 2; 2	GER; 1; 8	GER; 2; 1	EUR; 1; 10	EUR; 2 Ret	ITA; 1 Ret	ITA; 2; 12	JPN; 1 Ret	JPN; 2; 8	MAC; 1; 14	MAC; 2 DNS	10th	51
2009	Scuderia Proteam Motorsport	BMW 320si	BRA; 1; 8	**BRA**; **2**; 7	MEX; 1; 10	MEX; 2; 9	MAR; 1; 13	MAR; 2; 10	FRA; 1 DSQ	FRA; 2; 17	ESP; 1; 10	ESP; 2; 15	CZE; 1; 7	CZE; 2; 4	POR; 1; 14	POR; 2; 13	GBR; 1; 14	GBR; 2; 15	GER; 1 Ret	GER; 1; 15	ITA; 1; 9	ITA; 2; 12	JPN; 1; 14	JPN; 2; 11	MAC; 1; 14	MAC; 2; 12	15th	10
