= Sergio Hernández (racing driver) =

Spanish racing driver (born 1983)

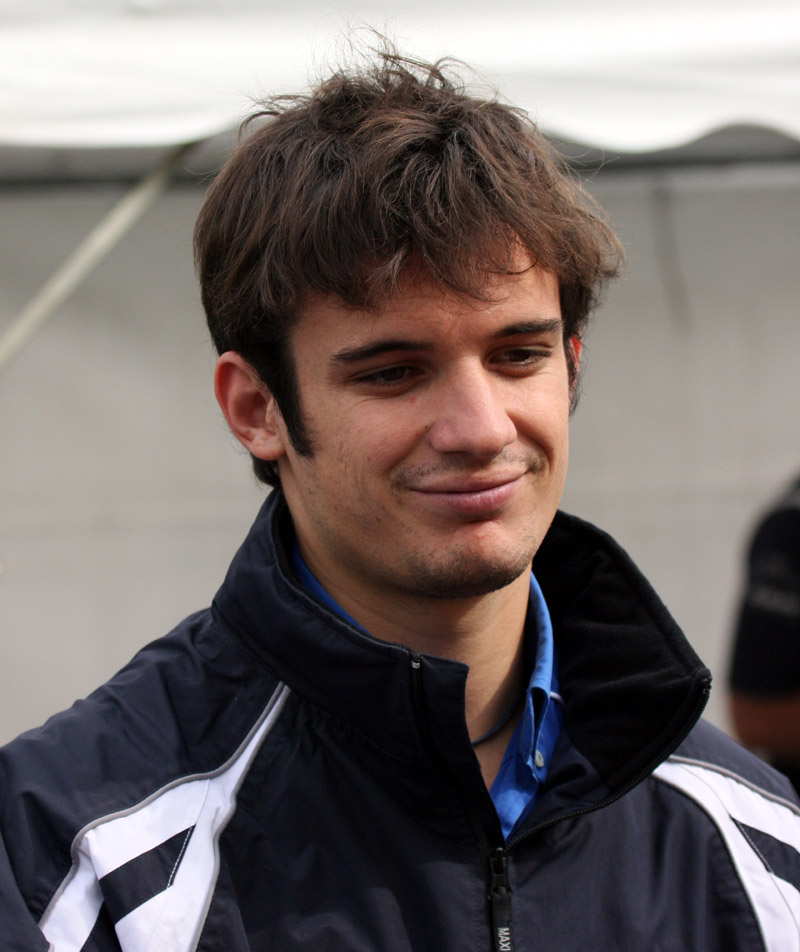
- Hernández at the 2008 FIA WTCC Race of Japan.
- Nationality: Spanish
- Full name: Sergio Hernández von Rekowski
- Born: 6 December 1983 (age 42) Xàbia, Spain

World Touring Car Championship career
- Debut season: 2007
- Starts: 90
- Wins: 1
- Podiums: 2
- Poles: 1
- Fastest laps: 2
- Best finish: 11th in 2009

Previous series
- 2011 2007–2010 2007 2006–08 2005–07 2004 2003 2003 2002–04 2001: Superstars Series; WTCC; Le Mans Series; Spanish GT Championship; GP2 Series; World Series by Nissan; British Formula 3 World Series Light; Spanish Formula Three; Formula BMW Iberia

Championship titles
- 2008 2010: WTCC Independents Trophy; WTCC Independents Trophy

Sergio Hernández von Rekowski (born 6 December 1983, Xàbia) is a Spanish racing driver, best known for having competed in the World Touring Car Championship. He won the WTCC Independents' Trophy in 2008 and 2010.

== Career ==
=== Early years ===
Hernández's career started in karting in 1998, lasting until 2001 when he moved up to formula racing with Portuguese Formula BMW and Spanish Formula Toyota.

In 2002, Hernández debuted in Spanish Formula Three, driving for the Azteca team, where he would stay for 2003. In 2003, he also drove for Azteca in British Formula 3, driving some races. He also drove part of the World Series Light season. He remained in Spanish F3 for 2004, only moving to the Campos team. He got a taste of World Series by Nissan, driving part of the season for the Saulnier team.

=== GP2 Series ===
In 2005, Hernández drove in the GP2 Series, partnered with Juan Cruz Álvarez, although Campos struggled throughout the season. He moved to Durango for 2006, partnering Lucas di Grassi, but results were even more sparse. During the GP2 season finale at Valencia, he drove for the Trident Racing team, replacing Ricardo Risatti who had himself replaced the injured Pastor Maldonado for three race meetings.

=== World Touring Car Championship ===
==== Proteam Motorsport (2007–2008; 2010) ====
Hernández switched to touring cars in 2007, racing a BMW 320si for Proteam Motorsport in the 2007 World Touring Car Championship season. He finished 20th in the drivers' standings that season after participating in nine of the eleven rounds.

Hernández continued to race for Proteam in 2008 alongside Stefano D'Aste. He took his first outright podium finish at the 2008 FIA WTCC Race of Japan, finishing third behind Tom Coronel and Augusto Farfus in the drying conditions of race one. That year, he won the Independents' Trophy for the first time.

Hernández rejoined Proteam in 2010 after BMW reduced their involvement in the series.

==== BMW Team Italy–Spain (2009) ====
In 2009, Hernández joined the works BMW Team Italy-Spain, replacing Félix Porteiro as teammate to Alessandro Zanardi.

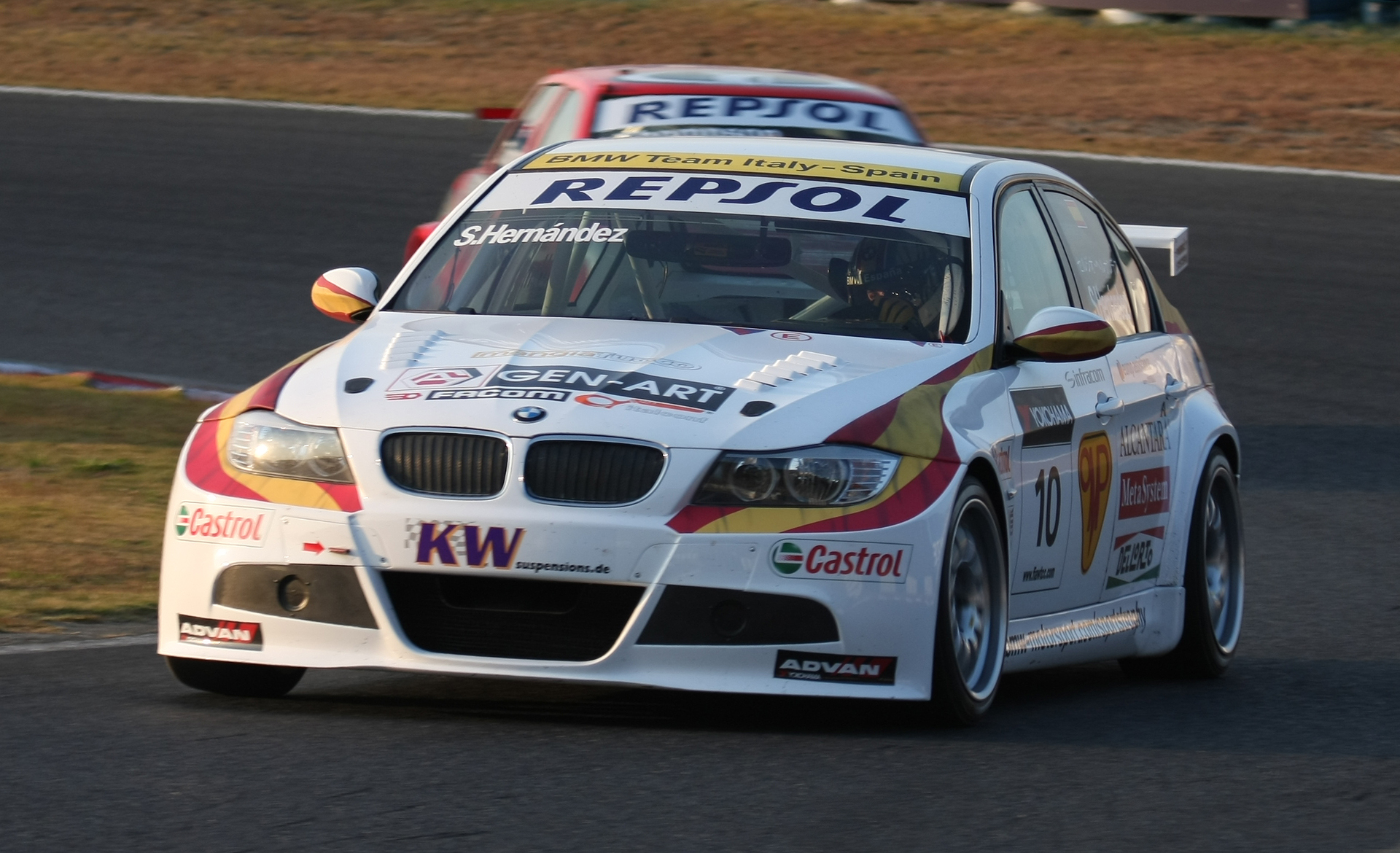
Hernández driving for BMW Team Italy-Spain at the 2009 FIA WTCC Race of Japan.

Hernández failed to get through to Q2 for the Race of Brazil but started ahead of his teammate. He finished in the points in his first race as a works driver. While letting his teammate pass during qualifying for the Race of Morocco, Hernández clashed with fellow BMW driver Andy Priaulx and finished the session nineteenth. Hernández retired from race two on the opening lap and his stranded car brought out the safety car. After qualifying for the Race of France, he was one of seven drivers who had their times from Q2 deleted for exceeding the engine rev limit on theirs cars. He finished fifth in race one but a collision with Porteiro on the first lap put Hernández out of the race and his BMW 320si caught fire, Porteiro was issued with a drive–through penalty for his involvement. He started on pole position for the reversed grid race at the Race of Spain but dropped down to sixth by the end of the race. Hernández took his first overall WTCC victory in race two of the Race of the Czech Republic, having started on the second row and passed pole sitter Yvan Muller on the third lap. Race one of the Race of Portugal saw Hernandez and the Lada of Jaap van Lagen, who started 17th and 18th respectively tangle after the rolling start, pitching Hernández in the concrete barrier. He was subsequently taken to hospital for checks on his ankle and was unable to start race two. Contact from SEAT Sport driver Jordi Gené during race two of the Race of Italy spun Hernández and dropped him down the order and he eventually finished eleventh. He finished the season eleventh in the drivers' championship as the fourth best BMW factory driver and one place ahead of his teammate. In December 2009, BMW announced it was to reduce its involvement in the WTCC from five cars to two. ROAL Motorsport would no longer be involved with the German manufacturer, leaving Hernández to find a seat himself for 2010.

== Racing record ==
=== Complete Spanish Formula Three Championship results ===
(key) (Races in bold indicate pole position) (Races in italics indicate fastest lap)

Year	Entrant	1	2	3	4	5	6	7	8	9	10	11	12	13	14	DC	Points
2002	Azteca Motorsport	ALB; 1; 5	ALB; 2; 7	JER; 1; 4	JER; 2; 2	EST; 1; 7	EST; 2; 4	VAL; 9	JER; 1; 6	JER; 2 Ret	JAR; 1 Ret	JAR; 2; 15	CAT; 1; 10	CAT; 2; 7		9th	109
2003	Azteca Motorsport	ALB; 1; 11	ALB; 2 DNS	JAR; 1; 6	JAR; 2; 5	JER; 1; 7	JER; 2; 5	EST; 1; 6	EST; 2; 9	VAL; 1; 3	VAL; 2; 7	JER; 9	CAT; 1; 10	CAT; 2 Ret		7th	103
2004	Adrián Campos Motorsport	ALB; 1; 19	ALB; 2; 5	JAR; 1; 4	JAR; 2 DNS	JER; 1; 6	JER; 2; 11	EST; 1; 5	EST; 2 Ret	VAL; 1; 8	VAL; 2; 5	JER; 1; 7	JER; 2; 3	CAT; 1 Ret	CAT; 2 Ret	6th	41

=== Complete British Formula Three Championship results ===
(key) (Races in bold indicate pole position) (Races in italics indicate fastest lap)

Year	Entrant	Chassis	Engine	Class	1	2	3	4	5	6	7	8	9	10	11	12	13	14	15	16	17	18	19	20	21	22	23	24	DC	Points
2003	Azteca Motorsport	Dallara F301	Opel Spiess	Scholarship	DON; 1; 22	DON; 2 Ret	SNE; 1; 19	SNE; 2 Ret	CRO; 1	CRO; 2	KNO; 1	KNO; 2	SIL; 1; 24	SIL; 2; 23	CAS; 1	CAS; 2	OUL; 1	OUL; 2	ROC; 1	ROC; 2	THR; 1	THR; 2	SPA; 1	SPA; 2	DON; 1	DON; 2	BRH; 1	BRH; 2	8th	30

=== Complete World Series Lights results ===
(key) (Races in bold indicate pole position) (Races in italics indicate fastest lap)

Year	Entrant	1	2	3	4	5	6	7	8	9	10	11	12	13	14	15	16	DC	Points
2003	RC Motorsport	MNZ; 1	MNZ; 2	LAU; 1	LAU; 2	MAG; 1	MAG; 2	A1R; 1	A1R; 2	CAT; 1	CAT; 2	VAL; 1	VAL; 2	ALB; 1; 6	ALB; 2 Ret	JAR; 1; 8	JAR; 2; 7	13th	13

=== Complete World Series by Nissan results ===
(key) (Races in bold indicate pole position) (Races in italics indicate fastest lap)

Year	Entrant	1	2	3	4	5	6	7	8	9	10	11	12	13	14	15	16	17	18	DC	Points
2004	Saulnier Racing	JAR; 1	JAR; 2	ZOL; 1	ZOL; 2	MAG; 1	MAG; 2	VAL; 1	VAL; 2	LAU; 1; 12	LAU; 2; 10	EST; 1; 5	EST; 2; 6	CAT; 1; 6	CAT; 2; 10	VAL; 1; 12	VAL; 2 Ret	JER; 1 DNS	JER; 2; 7	13th	22

=== Complete GP2 Series results ===
(key) (Races in bold indicate pole position) (Races in italics indicate fastest lap)

Year	Entrant	1	2	3	4	5	6	7	8	9	10	11	12	13	14	15	16	17	18	19	20	21	22	23	DC	Points
2005	Campos Racing	IMO; FEA; 11	IMO; SPR; 8	CAT; FEA; Ret	CAT; SPR; 18	MON; FEA; 8	NÜR; FEA; 15	NÜR; SPR; 5	MAG; FEA; 13	MAG; SPR; 14	SIL; FEA; 16	SIL; SPR; 12	HOC; FEA; Ret	HOC; SPR; 19	HUN; FEA; Ret	HUN; SPR; 18	IST; FEA; Ret	IST; SPR; NC	MNZ; FEA; Ret	MNZ; SPR; 7	SPA; FEA; Ret	SPA; SPR; 20	BHR; FEA; 15	BHR; SPR; 18	20th	3
2006	Durango	VAL; FEA; Ret	VAL; SPR; Ret	IMO; FEA; Ret	IMO; SPR; 13	NÜR; FEA; 12	NÜR; SPR; Ret	CAT; FEA; Ret	CAT; SPR; 13	MON; FEA; 8	SIL; FEA; 10	SIL; SPR; EX	MAG; FEA; 14	MAG; SPR; 11	HOC; FEA; 10	HOC; SPR; Ret	HUN; FEA; Ret	HUN; SPR; Ret	IST; FEA; 11	IST; SPR; 10	MNZ; FEA; 13	MNZ; SPR; Ret			23rd	1
2007	Trident Racing	BHR; FEA	BHR; SPR	CAT; FEA	CAT; SPR	MON; FEA	MAG; FEA	MAG; SPR	SIL; FEA	SIL; SPR	NÜR; FEA	NÜR; SPR	HUN; FEA	HUN; SPR	IST; FEA	IST; SPR	MNZ; FEA	MNZ; SPR	SPA; FEA	SPA; SPR	VAL; FEA; Ret	VAL; SPR; 19			36th	0

=== Complete World Touring Car Championship results ===
(key) (Races in bold indicate pole position) (Races in italics indicate fastest lap)

Year	Team	Car	1	2	3	4	5	6	7	8	9	10	11	12	13	14	15	16	17	18	19	20	21	22	23	24	DC	Points
2007	Proteam Motorsport	BMW 320si	BRA; 1; 14	BRA; 2 Ret	NED; 1	NED; 2	ESP; 1; 10	ESP; 2; 8	FRA; 1; 14	FRA; 2 Ret	CZE; 1	CZE; 2	POR; 1 Ret	POR; 2 DNS	SWE; 1 Ret	SWE; 2; 22	GER; 1; 14	GER; 2; 17	GBR; 1; 18	GBR; 2; 16	ITA; 1; 19	ITA; 2; 17	MAC; 1; 21	MAC; 2; 15			20th	1
2008	Scuderia Proteam Motorsport	BMW 320si	BRA; 1; 14	BRA; 2; 15	MEX; 1; 17	MEX; 2; 15	ESP; 1; 23	ESP; 2; 12	FRA; 1; 17	FRA; 2; 17	CZE; 1; 15	CZE; 2; 13	POR; 1 Ret	POR; 2; 15	GBR; 1; 13	GBR; 2; 8	GER; 1; 10	GER; 2; 7	EUR; 1; 9	EUR; 2; 10	ITA; 1; 14	ITA; 2; 13	JPN; 1; 12	JPN; 2; 3	MAC; 1; 12	MAC; 2 Ret	16th	9
2009	BMW Team Italy-Spain	BMW 320si	BRA; 1; 6	BRA; 2; 10	MEX; 1; 9	MEX; 2; 5	MAR; 1; 14	MAR; 2 Ret	FRA; 1; 5	FRA; 2 Ret	ESP; 1; 8	**ESP**; **2**; 6	CZE; 1; 5	CZE; 2; 1	POR; 1 Ret	POR; 2 DNS	GBR; 1; 16	GBR; 2; 9	GER; 1; 8	GER; 2; 5	ITA; 1; 7	ITA; 2; 11	JPN; 1 Ret	JPN; 2; 12	MAC; 1; 10	MAC; 2; 11	11th	36
2010	Scuderia Proteam Motorsport	BMW 320si	BRA; 1; 13	BRA; 2; 10	MAR; 1; 14	MAR; 2 Ret	ITA; 1; 12	ITA; 2; 16	BEL; 1; 13	BEL; 2; 9	POR; 1; 9	POR; 2; 17	GBR; 1; 16	GBR; 2; 12	CZE; 1; 11	CZE; 2; 11	GER; 1; 10	GER; 2; 13	ESP; 1; 19	ESP; 2; 15	JPN; 1; 11	JPN; 2 Ret	MAC; 1; 11	MAC; 2; 9			16th	9

=== Complete International Superstars Series results ===
(key) (Races in bold indicate pole position) (Races in italics indicate fastest lap)

Year	Team	Car	1	2	3	4	5	6	7	8	9	10	11	12	13	14	15	16	DC	Points
2011	Campos Racing	BMW M3 (E92)	MNZ; R1; Ret	MNZ; R2; Ret	VNC; R1	VNC; R2	ALG; R1; 9	ALG; R2; Ret	DON; R1	DON; R2	MIS; R1	MIS; R2	SPA; R1	SPA; R2	MUG; R1	MUG; R2	VAL; R1	VAL; R2	27th	2

Sporting positions
Preceded by Stefano D'Aste	World Touring Car Championship; Independents' Trophy winner 2008	Succeeded by Tom Coronel
Preceded by Tom Coronel	World Touring Car Championship; Independents' Trophy winner 2010	Succeeded by Kristian Poulsen
