= Kirill Ladygin =

Russian racing driver

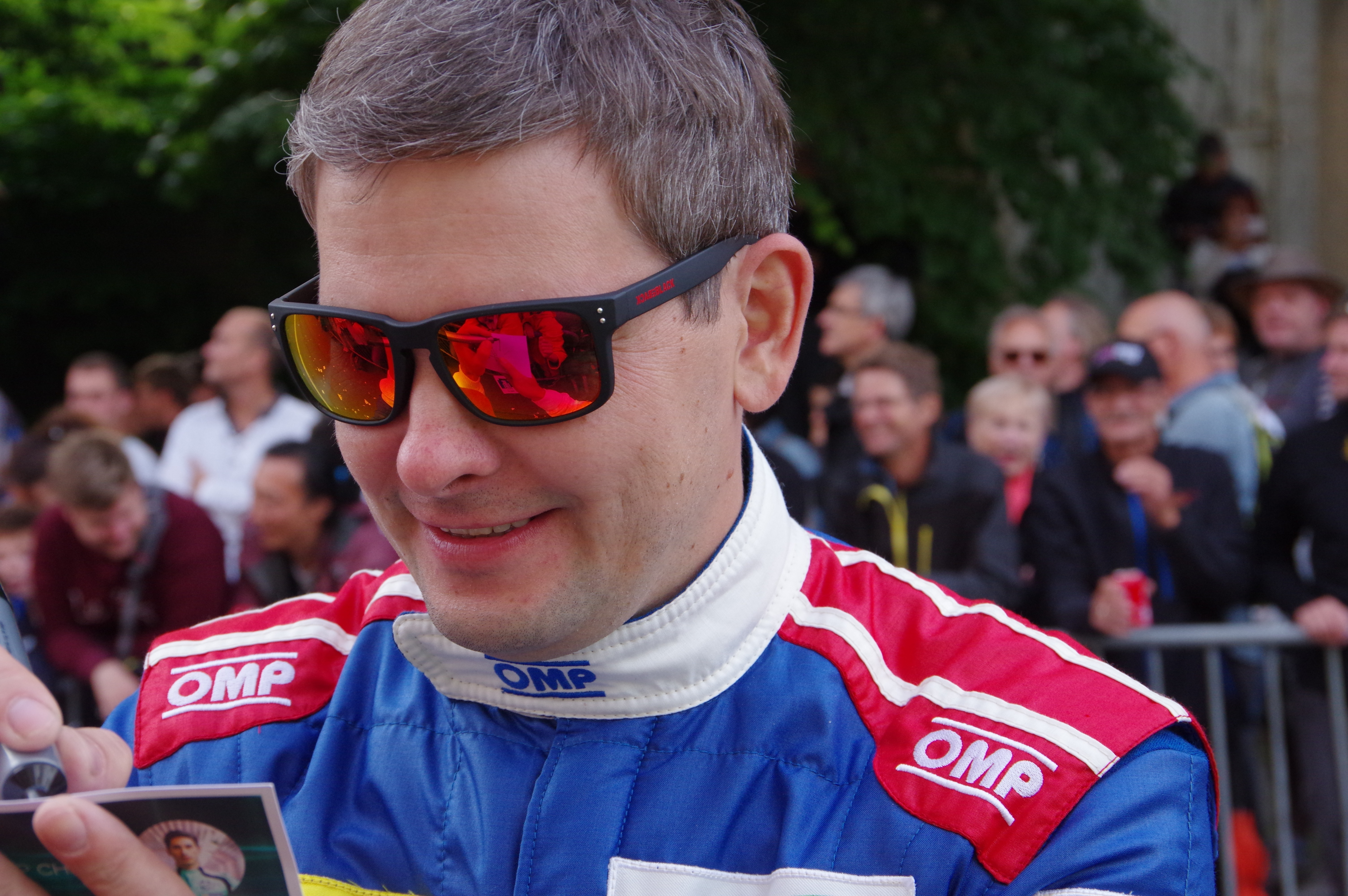
- Nationality: Russian
- Born: Kirill Sergeyevich Ladygin; 17 December 1978 (age 47) Ekaterinburg, Soviet Union
- Relatives: Anton Ladygin (brother)

World Touring Car Championship career
- Debut season: 2008
- Current team: Lada Sport
- Categorisation: FIA Silver (until 2013); FIA Gold (2014–)
- Car number: 19
- Starts: 26
- Wins: 0
- Poles: 0
- Fastest laps: 0
- Best finish: 25th in 2009

Previous series
- 2004, 2007 2004, 2006: Formula 1600 Russia; Lada Revolution Cup

Championship titles
- 2004, 2006: Lada Revolution Cup

Kirill Sergeyevich Ladygin (born 17 December 1978 in Ekaterinburg) is a Russian professional auto racing driver. He is twice champion of the Russian LADA Revolution Cup in 2004 and 2006. In 2008, he competed in the FIA World Touring Car Championship when the Russian Bears Motorsport Team entered a third car, alongside Jaap van Lagen and Viktor Shapovalov. He drove in the final eight rounds of the season in a Lada 110, with a best placed race finish of nineteenth.

For the 2009 season, Ladygin returned with Russian Bears team, this time with full manufacturer backing from Lada.

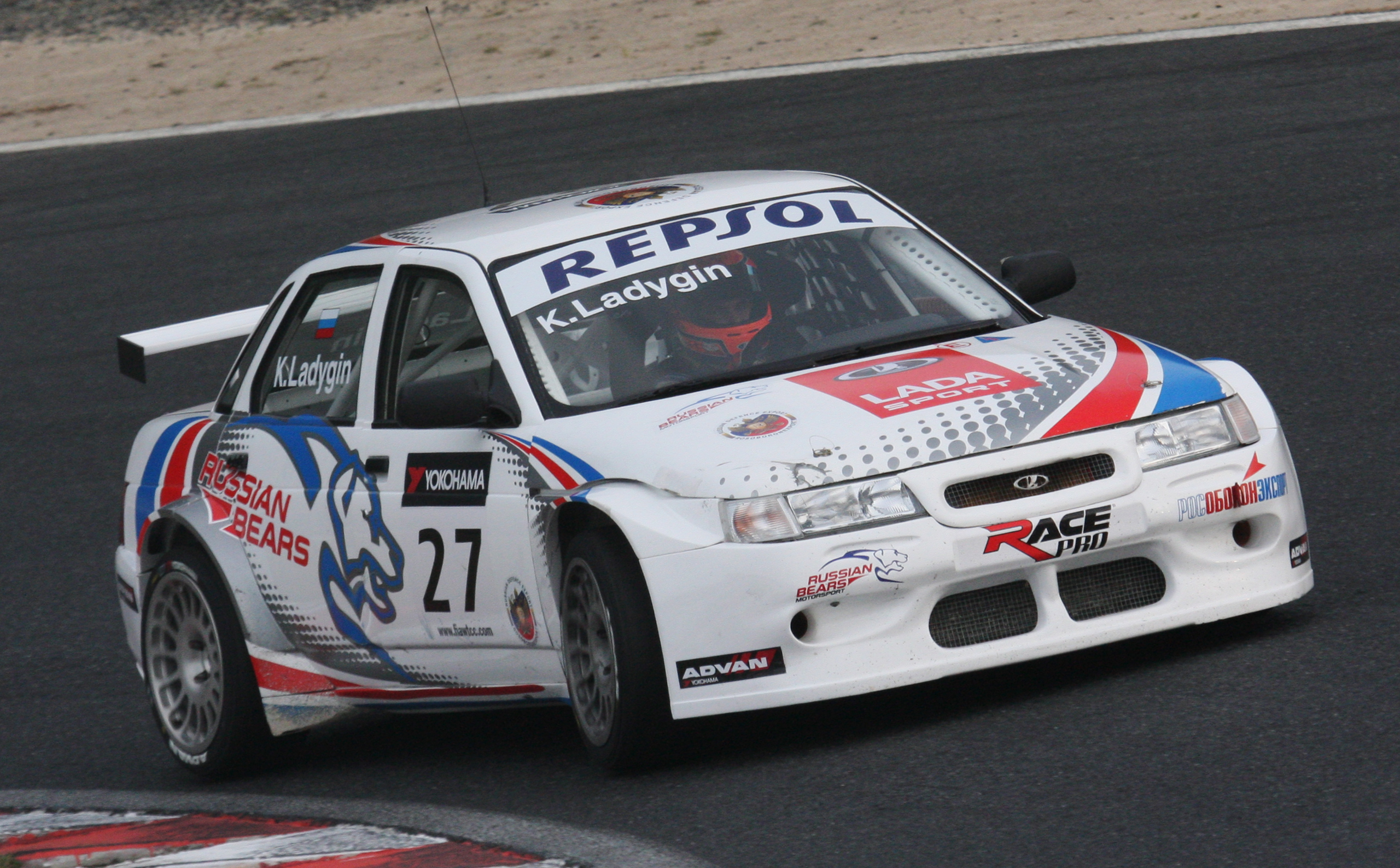
Ladygin driving the Russian Bears Motorsport Lada 110 at Suzuka during the 2008 World Touring Car Championship season.

== Racing record ==
=== Complete World Touring Car Championship results ===
(key) (Races in bold indicate pole position) (Races in italics indicate fastest lap)

Year	Team	Car	1	2	3	4	5	6	7	8	9	10	11	12	13	14	15	16	17	18	19	20	21	22	23	24	DC	Points
2008	Russian Bears Motorsport	Lada 110 2.0	BRA; 1	BRA; 2	MEX; 1	MEX; 2	ESP; 1	ESP; 2	FRA; 1	FRA; 2	CZE; 1	CZE; 2	POR; 1	POR; 2	GBR; 1	GBR; 2	GER; 1	GER; 2	EUR; 1 Ret	EUR; 2; 22	ITA; 1; 22	ITA; 2; 23	JPN; 1; 19	JPN; 2 Ret	MAC; 1 Ret	MAC; 2 Ret	NC	0
2009	LADA Sport	LADA 110 2.0	BRA; 1; 14	BRA; 2; 22	MEX; 1; 18	MEX; 2; 20	MAR; 1; 17	MAR; 2; 11	FRA; 1 Ret	FRA; 2 Ret	ESP; 1 Ret	ESP; 2; 24	CZE; 1; 15	CZE; 2; 17	POR; 1; 19	POR; 2; 17	GBR; 1; 19	GBR; 2; 24									25th	0
2009	LADA Sport	LADA Priora																	GER; 1; 16	GER; 2; 23	ITA; 1; 14	ITA; 2; 20	JPN; 1; 16	JPN; 2 DNS	MAC; 1 DNS	MAC; 2 DNS	25th	0

=== 24 Hours of Le Mans results ===
Year	Team	Co-Drivers	Car	Class	Laps	Pos.	Class Pos.
2014	(Russia) SMP Racing	(France) Nicolas Minassian (Italy) Maurizio Mediani	Oreca 03R-Nissan	LMP2	9	DNF	DNF
2015	(Russia) SMP Racing	(Russia) Mikhail Aleshin (Russia) Anton Ladygin	BR Engineering BR01-Nissan	LMP2	322	33rd	13th
2016	(Russia) SMP Racing	(Russia) Vitaly Petrov (Russia) Viktor Shaytar	BR Engineering BR01-Nissan	LMP2	353	7th	**3rd**

=== Complete WeatherTech SportsCar Championship results ===
(key) (Races in bold indicate pole position) (Races in italics indicate fastest lap)

Year	Team	Class	Make	Engine	1	2	3	4	5	6	7	8	9	10	Pos.	Points
2016	SMP Racing	P	BR Engineering BR01	Nissan VK45DE 4.5 L V8	DAY; 9	SEB	LBH	LAG	DET	WGL	MOS	ROA	COA	PET	33rd	23

=== Complete World Touring Car Cup results ===
(key) (Races in bold indicate pole position) (Races in italics indicate fastest lap)

Year	Team	Car	1	2	3	4	5	6	7	8	9	10	11	12	13	14	15	16	DC	Points
2021	Rosneft Lada Sport	Lada Vesta Sport TCR	GER; 1	GER; 2	POR; 1	POR; 2	ESP; 1	ESP; 2	HUN; 1	HUN; 2	CZE; 1	CZE; 2	FRA; 1	FRA; 2	ITA; 1	ITA; 2	RUS; 1; 18	RUS; 2; 14	NC‡	0‡

^{‡} As Ladygin was a Wildcard entry, he was ineligible to score points.
