= FIA WTCR Race of Germany =

WTCR touring car race in Germany.

- Nürburgring (2015–2022)

Race information
- Number of times held: 14
- First held: 2005
- Last held: 2021
- Most wins (drivers): (United Kingdom) Andy Priaulx (4)
- Most wins (constructors): (Germany) BMW (11)

Last race (2021)
- Race 1 Winner: (Portugal) Tiago Monteiro; (ALL-INKL.DE Münnich Motorsport)
- Race 2 Winner: (France) Jean-Karl Vernay; (Engstler Hyundai N Liqui Moly Racing Team)

The FIA WTCR Race of Germany, previously known as the FIA WTCC Race of Germany, is a round of the World Touring Car Cup, which originally was held at the Motorsport Arena Oschersleben in Germany.

The race ran at Oschersleben every year since the return of World Touring Car Championship from 2005 to 2011. It was left off the 2012 calendar. The event returned to the calendar in 2015, this time hosted at the Nürburgring Nordschleife as part of the 24 Hours Nürburgring weekend. The races are three laps each.

== Winners ==
Year	Race	Driver	Manufacturer	Location	Report
2022	Race 1	Cancelled due to the tyre punctures		Nürburgring Nordschleife	Report
2022	Race 2	Cancelled due to the tyre punctures		Nürburgring Nordschleife	Report
2021	Race 1	(Portugal) Tiago Monteiro	(Japan) Honda	Nürburgring Nordschleife	Report
2021	Race 2	(France) Jean-Karl Vernay	(South Korea) Hyundai	Nürburgring Nordschleife	Report
2020	Race 1	(Argentina) Esteban Guerrieri	(Japan) Honda	Nürburgring Nordschleife	Report
2020	Race 2	(France) Yann Ehrlacher	(China) (Sweden) Lynk & Co	Nürburgring Nordschleife	Report
2019	Race 1	(Hungary) Norbert Michelisz	(South Korea) Hyundai	Nürburgring Nordschleife	Report
2019	Race 2	(Sweden) Johan Kristoffersson	(Germany) Volkswagen	Nürburgring Nordschleife	Report
2019	Race 3	(Germany) Benjamin Leuchter	(Germany) Volkswagen	Nürburgring Nordschleife	Report
2018	Race 1	(France) Yvan Muller	(South Korea) Hyundai	Nürburgring Nordschleife	Report
2018	Race 2	(Argentina) Esteban Guerrieri	(Japan) Honda	Nürburgring Nordschleife	Report
2018	Race 3	(Sweden) Thed Björk	(South Korea) Hyundai	Nürburgring Nordschleife	Report
2017	Opening Race	(Sweden) Thed Björk	(Sweden) Volvo	Nürburgring Nordschleife	Report
2017	Main Race	(Netherlands) Nicky Catsburg	(Sweden) Volvo	Nürburgring Nordschleife	Report
2016	Opening Race	(Argentina) José María López	(France) Citroën	Nürburgring Nordschleife	Report
2016	Main Race	(Argentina) José María López	(France) Citroën	Nürburgring Nordschleife	Report
2015	Race 1	(Argentina) José María López	(France) Citroën	Nürburgring Nordschleife	Report
2015	Race 2	(France) Yvan Muller	(France) Citroën	Nürburgring Nordschleife	Report
2011	Race 1	(France) Yvan Muller	(United States) Chevrolet	Oschersleben	Report
2011	Race 2	(Germany) Franz Engstler	(Germany) BMW	Oschersleben	Report
2010	Race 1	(Switzerland) Alain Menu	(United States) Chevrolet	Oschersleben	Report
2010	Race 2	(United Kingdom) Andy Priaulx	(Germany) BMW	Oschersleben	Report
2009	Race 1	(United Kingdom) Andy Priaulx	(Germany) BMW	Oschersleben	Report
2009	Race 2	(Brazil) Augusto Farfus	(Germany) BMW	Oschersleben	Report
2008	Race 1	(Brazil) Augusto Farfus	(Germany) BMW	Oschersleben	Report
2008	Race 2	(Spain) Félix Porteiro	(Germany) BMW	Oschersleben	Report
2007	Race 1	(France) Yvan Muller	(Spain) SEAT	Oschersleben	Report
2007	Race 2	(Brazil) Augusto Farfus	(Germany) BMW	Oschersleben	Report
2006	Race 1	(United Kingdom) Andy Priaulx	(Germany) BMW	Oschersleben	Report
2006	Race 2	(Germany) Jörg Müller	(Germany) BMW	Oschersleben	Report
2005	Race 1	(United Kingdom) Andy Priaulx	(Germany) BMW	Oschersleben	Report
2005	Race 2	(Italy) Alessandro Zanardi	(Germany) BMW	Oschersleben	Report

== Gallery ==
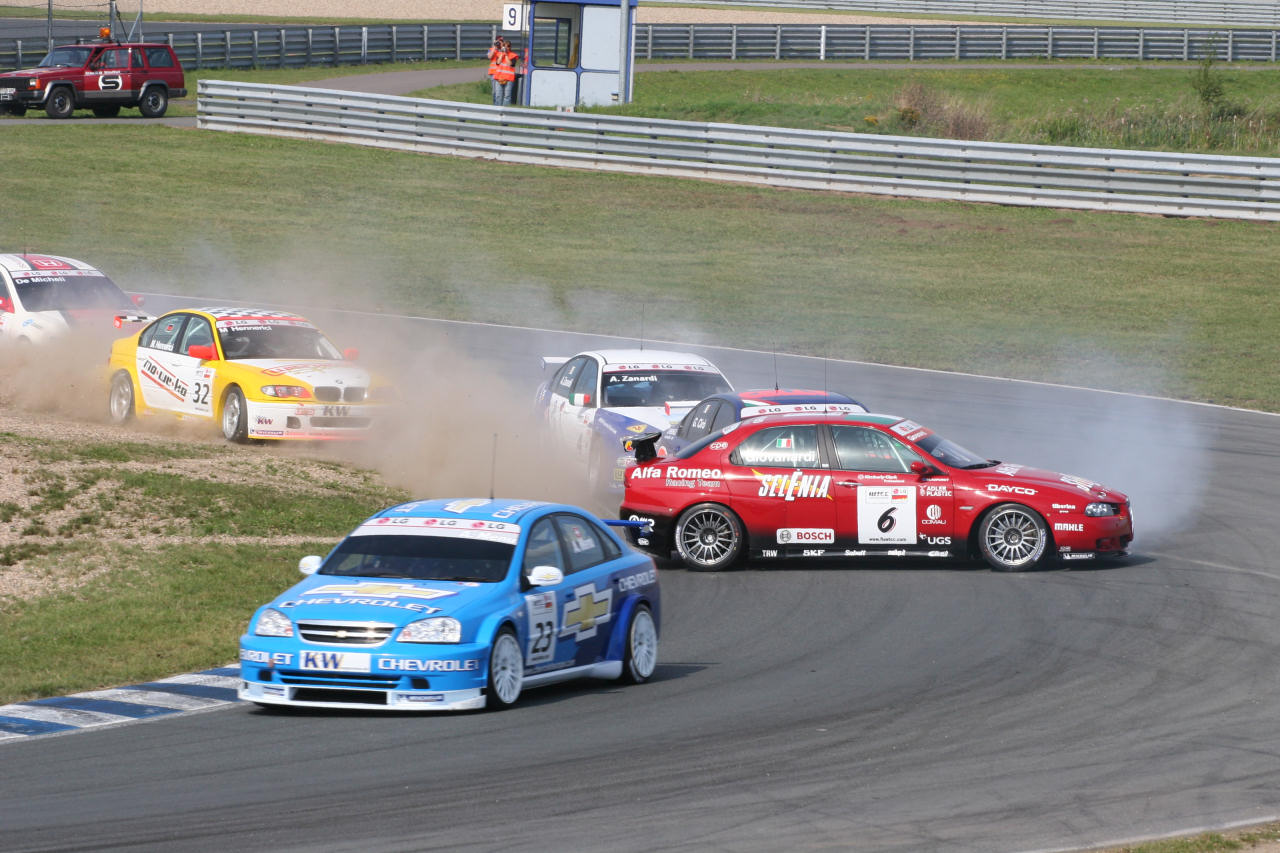
Fabrizio Giovanardi is spun round during the 2005 Race of Germany

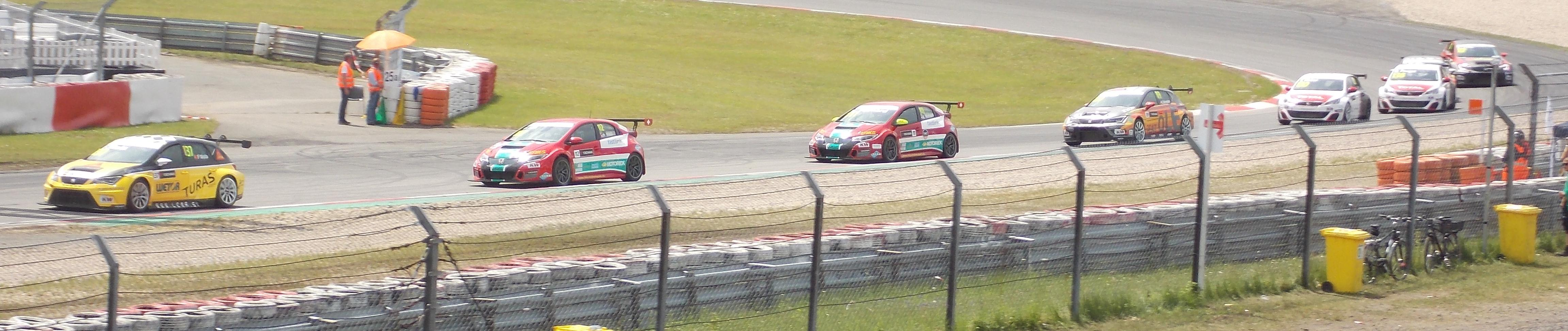
The field of the 2016 ETCC season in Race 1 on the Nürburgring.

Oschersleben, which held races in 2007–2011

Original layout of Oschersleben, which held races in 2005–2006
