= FIA WTCC Race of Europe =

Race of Europe
- Autodromo Enzo e Dino Ferrari (2008)

Race information
- Number of times held: 1
- First held: 2008
- Last held: 2008
- Most wins (drivers): (France) Yvan Muller (1) (United Kingdom) James Thompson (1)
- Most wins (constructors): (Spain) SEAT (1) (Japan) Honda (1)

Last race (2008)
- Race 1 Winner: (France) Yvan Muller; (SEAT Sport)
- Race 2 Winner: (United Kingdom) James Thompson; (N.Technology)

The FIA WTCC Race of Europe was a round of the World Touring Car Championship, which was held at the Autodromo Enzo e Dino Ferrari near Imola in Italy during the 2008 season.

A round at the newly rebuilt Imola circuit was added to the 2008 calendar as replacement for the Race of Sweden which had been cancelled following a request from the Swedish National Sporting Authority after the WTCC failed to reach a commercial agreement with the event's promoters. As there was already a Race of Italy in the 2008 calendar this round was named the Race of Europe. Incidentally, Imola had previously hosted an additional round of the championship in 2005, under the title of Race of San Marino. Monza was dropped from the 2009 calendar, so the Imola round became the Race of Italy.

== Winners ==
Year	Race	Driver	Manufacturer	Location	Report
2008	Race 1	(France) Yvan Muller	SEAT	Imola	Report
2008	Race 2	(United Kingdom) James Thompson	Honda	Imola	Report
