= Henry Ho =

Macanese racing driver

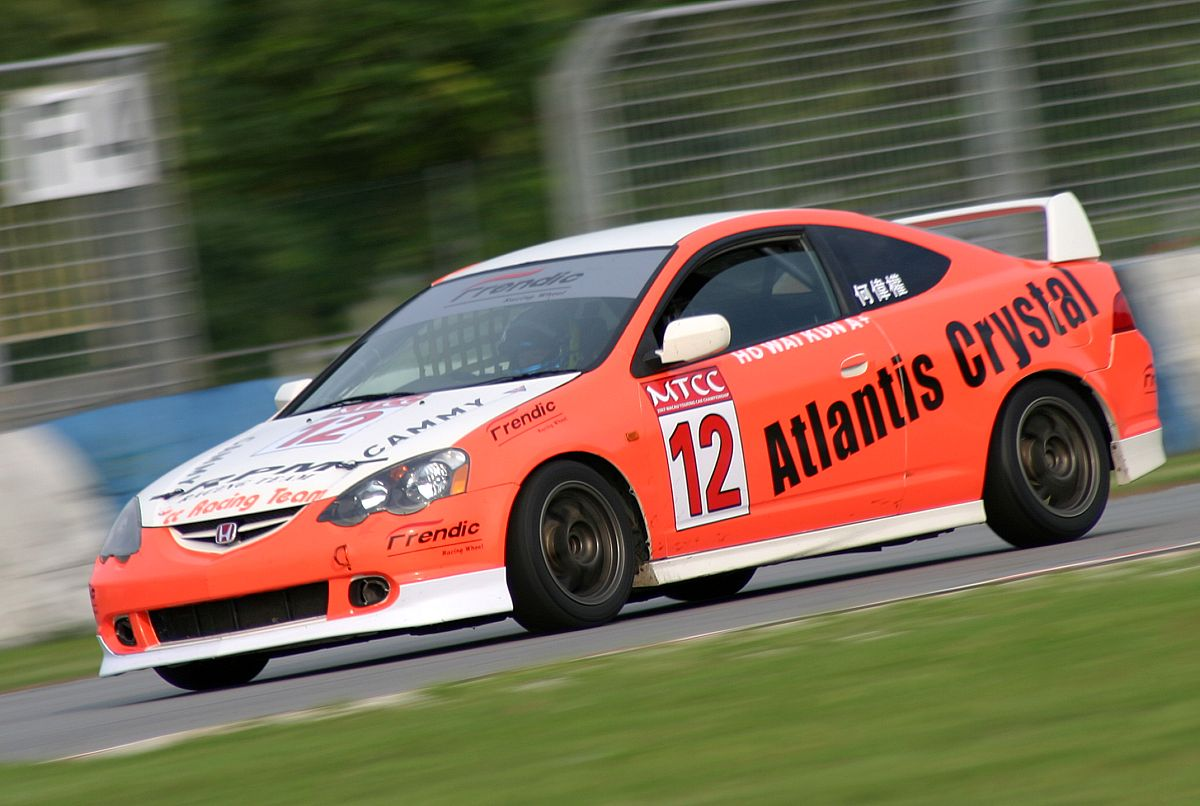
- Henry Ho driving his Honda Integra at Zhuhai International Circuit.
- Nationality: Macanese
- Born: 12 January 1982 (age 44) Macau

Previous series
- 2009–10, 2012–13 2006: WTCC; ATCC

Championship titles
- 2006: ATCC Division 1

"Henry" Ho Wai Kun (Chinese: 何偉權, born January 12, 1982) is a racing driver from Macau.

== Career ==
Ho won the Macau Touring Car Championship in 2005, 2008 and 2009. He also won the ST4 class of the Japanese Super Taikyu series in 2006, and finished third in the main ST1 class in 2007. In 2008, he competed in the Asian Touring Car Championship.

Ho raced in the World Touring Car Championship for Engstler Motorsport at the final two rounds of the 2009 season in Japan and Macau.

Ho lists his hobbies as wakeboarding, shopping and sleeping.

== Career results ==
=== Complete World Touring Car Championship results ===
(key) (Races in bold indicate pole position) (Races in italics indicate fastest lap)

Year	Team	Car	1	2	3	4	5	6	7	8	9	10	11	12	13	14	15	16	17	18	19	20	21	22	23	24	DC	Points
2009	Liqui Moly Team Engstler	BMW 320si	BRA; 1	BRA; 2	MEX; 1	MEX; 2	MAR; 1	MAR; 2	FRA; 1	FRA; 2	ESP; 1	ESP; 2	CZE; 1	CZE; 2	POR; 1	POR; 2	GBR; 1	GBR; 2	GER; 1	GER; 2	ITA; 1	ITA; 2	JPN; 1; 22	JPN; 2 Ret	MAC; 1; 20	MAC; 2; 17	NC	0
2010	Ho Chun Kei / Sports & You Asia	BMW 320si	BRA; 1	BRA; 2	MAR; 1	MAR; 2	ITA; 1	ITA; 2	BEL; 1	BEL; 2	POR; 1	POR; 2	GBR; 1	GBR; 2	CZE; 1	CZE; 2	GER; 1	GER; 2	ESP; 1	ESP; 2	JPN; 1; 18	JPN; 2; 21†	MAC; 1; 21†	MAC; 2 DNS			NC	0
2012	Five Auto Racing Team	BMW 320si	ITA; 1	ITA; 2	ESP; 1	ESP; 2	MAR; 1	MAR; 2	SVK; 1	SVK; 2	HUN; 1	HUN; 2	AUT; 1	AUT; 2	POR; 1	POR; 2	BRA; 1	BRA; 2	USA; 1	USA; 2	JPN; 1	JPN; 2	CHN; 1	CHN; 2	MAC; 1; 16	MAC; 2 Ret	NC	0
2013	Liqui Moly Team Engstler	BMW 320si	ITA; 1	ITA; 2	MAR; 1	MAR; 2	SVK; 1	SVK; 2	HUN; 1	HUN; 2	AUT; 1	AUT; 2	RUS; 1	RUS; 2	POR; 1	POR; 2	ARG; 1	ARG; 2	USA; 1	USA; 2	JPN; 1; 24	JPN; 2; 21	CHN; 1; 23	CHN; 2; 25	MAC; 1; 19	MAC; 2; 9	23rd	2
