= Andrea Larini =

Italian auto racing driver (born 1968)

- Nationality: (Italy) Italian
- Born: 2 December 1968 (age 57) Camaiore, Tuscany, Italy
- Relatives: Nicola Larini (brother)

SEAT León Eurocup career
- Debut season: 2008
- Current team: Zengo Motorsport
- Car number: 4
- Former teams: PRS Group Speed Racing
- Best finish: 15th in 2008

Previous series
- 2006 2005 2005 1990-91: Alfa 147 Cup Italy; WTCC; Italian Superturismo Championship; Italian F3

Championship titles
- 2005: Viva La Topa

Andrea Larini (born 2 December 1968) is an Italian auto racing driver. He is the younger brother of fellow racing driver Nicola Larini.

== Career ==
Larini raced in Italian F3 in the early 1990s. In 2005 he raced in the Italian Superturismo Championship. He also raced in three rounds of the World Touring Car Championship. He raced in the Italian Alfa Romeo 147 Cup in 2006. In 2008, he began competing in the SEAT León Eurocup, finishing the championship in 15th. He continued in the Eurocup in 2009, and was the highest points-scorer at Motorsport Arena Oschersleben. This won him a drive for SUNRED Engineering in the World Touring Car Championship at Imola.

== Racing record ==
=== Complete World Touring Car Championship results ===
(key) (Races in bold indicate pole position) (Races in italics indicate fastest lap)

Year	Team	Car	1	2	3	4	5	6	7	8	9	10	11	12	13	14	15	16	17	18	19	20	21	22	23	24	DC	Points
2005	DB Motorsport	Alfa Romeo 156	ITA; 1; 19	ITA; 2; 20	FRA; 1 Ret	FRA; 2 DNS	GBR; 1	GBR; 2	SMR; 1; 23	SMR; 2; 22	MEX; 1	MEX; 2	BEL; 1	BEL; 2	GER; 1	GER; 2	TUR; 1	TUR; 2	ESP; 1	ESP; 2	MAC; 1	MAC; 2					NC	0
2009	SUNRED Engineering	SEAT León 2.0 TFSI	BRA; 1	BRA; 2	MEX; 1	MEX; 2	MAR; 1	MAR; 2	FRA; 1	FRA; 2	ESP; 1	ESP; 2	CZE; 1	CZE; 2	POR; 1	POR; 2	GBR; 1	GBR; 2	GER; 1	GER; 2	ITA; 1 DSQ	ITA; 2; 21	JPN; 1	JPN; 2	MAC; 1	MAC; 2	NC	0

=== NASCAR ===
(key) (Bold – Pole position awarded by qualifying time. Italics – Pole position earned by points standings or practice time. * – Most laps led.)

==== Whelen Euro Series - Elite 1 ====
NASCAR Whelen Euro Series - Elite 1 results
Year	Team	No.	Make	1	2	3	4	5	6	7	8	9	10	11	12	NWES	Pts
2014	OverDrive	22	Chevy	VAL; 23	VAL; 9	BRH; 25	BRH; 20	TOU	TOU	NÜR; 25	NÜR; 25	UMB	UMB	BUG	BUG	33rd	99
