= 2009 SEAT León Eurocup =

Seasons
- ← 2008 2010 →

The 2009 SEAT León Eurocup was the second season of the SEAT León Eurocup, a one-make racing series supporting the World Touring Car Championship.

Hungarian Norbert Michelisz won the championship at the final round at Imola.

== Teams and drivers ==
Team	No.	Drivers	Rounds
(France) Team Clairet Sport	1	(France) Jean Marie Clairet	All
(Hungary) Zengő Motorsport	2	(Hungary) Róbert Mendre	2
(Hungary) Zengő Motorsport	3	(Hungary) Norbert Michelisz	All
(Hungary) Zengő Motorsport	4	(Italy) Andrea Larini	All
(Hungary) Zengő Motorsport	5	(Hungary) György Kontra	2
(Hungary) Zengő Motorsport	50	(Hungary) Gábor Wéber	6
(Spain) SUNRED	6	(Spain) Javier Ibran	All
(Spain) SUNRED	7	(Italy) Aldo Ponti	1–4, 6
(Spain) SUNRED	19	(Netherlands) Tim Coronel	All
(Spain) SUNRED	21	(Netherlands) Rob Kamphues	All
(Spain) SUNRED	23	(Czech Republic) Michal Matějovský	All
(Spain) SUNRED	28	(Spain) Diego Puyo	1–4
(Spain) SUNRED	30	(Spain) Santiago Navarro	4–6
(Spain) SUNRED	32	(France) Michaël Rossi	1–2, 5–6
(Italy) Rangoni Motorsport	8	(Italy) Massimiliano Pedalà	All
(Italy) Rangoni Motorsport	9	(Italy) Davide Roda	1–3, 6
(Italy) Rangoni Motorsport	14	(France) Martin Morente	1, 3–4
(Italy) Rangoni Motorsport	18	(Russia) Aleksey Dudukalo	1–3, 5–6
(Italy) Rangoni Motorsport	51	(Republic of Ireland) Eoin Murray	6
(Switzerland) SEAT Swiss Racing	10	(Switzerland) Fredy Barth	All
(Switzerland) Ursinho Racing by Carpi	11	(Switzerland) Urs Sonderegger	1–3, 5–6
(France) JR Niogret	12	(France) Jean Robert Niogret	1–5
Team Russia	15	(Russia) Anton Markin	All
Team Russia	16	(Russia) Oleg Petrikov	All
(Spain) Pujolaracing	30	(Spain) Santiago Navarro	1
(Spain) De Diego Motorsport	31	(Spain) Marcos De Diego	1
(Hungary) Zsille Motorsport	33	(Hungary) Bálint Hatvani	2, 5–6
(Hungary) Zsille Motorsport	34	(Hungary) Zoltán Bárkovics	2, 5–6
(Portugal) Oasis Motorsport	38	(Portugal) Miguel Freitas	3
(United Kingdom) Welch Motorsport	39	(United Kingdom) Daniel Welch	4
(United Kingdom) Advent Motorsport	44	(Sweden) Freddy Nordström	4
(Germany) GAG Racing Team	47	(Czech Republic) Petr Fulín	5
(Germany) GAG Racing Team	48	(Poland) Damien Sawicki	5

== Race calendar and results ==
Round		Circuit	Date	Pole position	Fastest lap	Race winner	Winning team	WTCC Prize Drive Winner*
1	R1	(Spain) Circuit Ricardo Tormo, Cheste	30 May	(Hungary) Norbert Michelisz	(Hungary) Norbert Michelisz	(Hungary) Norbert Michelisz	(Hungary) Zengő Motorsport	(Netherlands) Tim Coronel
1	R2	(Spain) Circuit Ricardo Tormo, Cheste	31 May		(Hungary) Norbert Michelisz	(Italy) Andrea Larini	(Hungary) Zengő Motorsport	(Netherlands) Tim Coronel
2	R1	(Czech Republic) Masaryk Circuit, Brno	20 June	(Hungary) Norbert Michelisz	(Hungary) Norbert Michelisz	(France) Michaël Rossi	(Spain) SUNRED	(Spain) Diego Puyo
2	R2	(Czech Republic) Masaryk Circuit, Brno	21 June		(Hungary) Norbert Michelisz	(Spain) Diego Puyo	(Spain) SUNRED	(Spain) Diego Puyo
3	R1	(Portugal) Circuito da Boavista	4 July	(Switzerland) Fredy Barth	(Italy) Massimiliano Pedalà	(Switzerland) Fredy Barth	(Switzerland) SEAT Swiss Racing	(Hungary) Norbert Michelisz
3	R2	(Portugal) Circuito da Boavista	5 July		(Spain) Diego Puyo	(Hungary) Norbert Michelisz	(Hungary) Zengő Motorsport	(Hungary) Norbert Michelisz
4	R1	(United Kingdom) Brands Hatch, Kent	18 July	(Hungary) Norbert Michelisz	(Czech Republic) Michal Matějovský	(Hungary) Norbert Michelisz	(Hungary) Zengő Motorsport	(France) Jean Marie Clairet
4	R2	(United Kingdom) Brands Hatch, Kent	19 July		(France) Jean Marie Clairet	(France) Jean Marie Clairet	(France) Team Clairet Sport	(France) Jean Marie Clairet
5	R1	(Germany) Motorsport Arena Oschersleben	5 September	(Hungary) Norbert Michelisz	(Hungary) Norbert Michelisz	(Hungary) Norbert Michelisz	(Hungary) Zengő Motorsport	(Italy) Andrea Larini
5	R2	(Germany) Motorsport Arena Oschersleben	6 September		(Switzerland) Fredy Barth	(Netherlands) Tim Coronel	(Spain) SUNRED	(Italy) Andrea Larini
6	R1	(Italy) Autodromo Enzo e Dino Ferrari	19 September	(France) Michaël Rossi	(France) Michaël Rossi	(France) Michaël Rossi	(Spain) SUNRED	(France) Michaël Rossi
6	R2	(Italy) Autodromo Enzo e Dino Ferrari	20 September		(Switzerland) Fredy Barth	(Hungary) Norbert Michelisz	(Hungary) Zengő Motorsport	(France) Michaël Rossi

* The highest points scorer from each round won a prize drive in the next round of the WTCC in a SEAT León with SUNRED Engineering. Michaël Rossi will race at the first European round in 2010.

== Championship standings ==
Pos	Driver	VAL (Spain)		BRN (Czech Republic)		POR (Portugal)		BRH (United Kingdom)		OSC (Germany)		IMO (Italy)		Pts
1	(Hungary) Norbert Michelisz	**1**	Ret	**4**	2	7	1	**1**	3	**1**	13	7	1	68
2	(Italy) Massimiliano Pedalà	4	5	2	4	2	Ret	7	2	Ret	4	4	4	55
3	(Switzerland) Fredy Barth	12	3	3	Ret	**1**	9	2	16	4	8	6	2	47
4	(Netherlands) Tim Coronel	3	4	Ret	12	6	3	15	11	8	**1**	3	3	43
5	(Spain) Diego Puyo	2	Ret	5	1	3	2	3	Ret					42
6	(France) Michaël Rossi	7	11	1	14					Ret	2	**1**	5	34
7	(France) Jean Marie Clairet	17	Ret	6	3	9	5	4	1	5	9	9	7	34
8	(Italy) Andrea Larini	8	**1**	8	**Ret**	8	**8**	8	**4**	2	3	10	Ret	34
9	(Czech Republic) Michal Matějovský	6	2	4	5	5	13	Ret	15	Ret	6	11	Ret	27
10	(Russia) Oleg Petrikov	9	6	7	8	11	6	14	8	7	Ret	17	6	15
11	(Portugal) Miguel Freitas					4	4							10
12	(Hungary) Gábor Wéber											2	Ret	8
13	(France) Jean Robert Niogret	Ret	8	Ret	11	14	7	6	7	Ret	11			8
14	(Sweden) Freddy Nordström							5	6					7
15	(Czech Republic) Petr Fulín									3	Ret			6
16	(Spain) Javier Ibran	10	7	DNS	Ret	13	10	10	9	6	15	13	10	5
17	(Hungary) Bálint Hatvani			Ret	6					Ret	7	Ret	9	5
18	(Russia) Aleksey Dudukalo	11	Ret	9	10	10	Ret			13	5	Ret	12	4
19	(Russia) Anton Markin	13	13	Ret	Ret	12	11	16	5	10	Ret	12	15	4
20	(Spain) Marcos De Diego	5	Ret											4
21	(Republic of Ireland) Eoin Murray											5	Ret	4
22	(Hungary) Róbert Mendre			10	7									2
23	(Hungary) Zoltán Bárkovics			Ret	9					Ret	Ret	8	**8**	2
24	(Netherlands) Rob Kamphues	15	Ret	11	DNS	DNS	DNS	12	10	9	10	Ret	11	0
25	(Spain) Santiago Navarro	Ret	9					11	13	11	12	Ret	14	0
26	(United Kingdom) Daniel Welch							9	Ret					0
27	(Italy) Aldo Ponti	14	10	Ret	Ret	Ret	12	Ret	14			16	Ret	0
28	(Switzerland) Urs Sonderegger	16	12	12	15	DNS	DNS			14	14	14	Ret	0
29	(France) Martin Morente	Ret	Ret			Ret	14	13	12					0
30	(Italy) Davide Roda	Ret	Ret	Ret	Ret	Ret	DNS					15	13	0
31	(Hungary) György Kontra			Ret	13									0
	(Poland) Damian Sawicki									Ret	DNS			0
Pos	Driver	VAL (Spain)		BRN (Czech Republic)		POR (Portugal)		BRH (United Kingdom)		OSC (Germany)		IMO (Italy)		Pts

Colour	Result
Gold	Winner
Silver	Second place
Bronze	Third place
Green	Points classification
Blue	Non-points classification
Blue	Non-classified finish (NC)
Purple	Retired, not classified (Ret)
Red	Did not qualify (DNQ)
Red	Did not pre-qualify (DNPQ)
Black	Disqualified (DSQ)
White	Did not start (DNS)
White	Withdrew (WD)
White	Race cancelled (C)
Blank	Did not practice (DNP)
Blank	Did not arrive (DNA)
Blank	Excluded (EX)

**Bold** – Pole
Italics – Fastest Lap
