= Marin Čolak =

Croatian racing driver (born 1984)

- Nationality: Croatian
- Born: 4 March 1984 (age 42) Zagreb, Croatia

Previous series
- 2010 2008–2009 2008–2009 2008 2008 2005–2008 2004 2003 2001–2002 2001 1999: ETCC; WTCC; Dutch Winter Endurance Series; SEAT Leon Supercopa Spain; SEAT León Eurocup; SEAT Leon Supercopa Germany; Volkswagen Polo Cup; German Formula Three; Formula Renault 2000 Eurocup; Formula Renault 2.0 Germany; Formula Opel Cup Croatia

Marin Čolak (born 4 March 1984 in Zagreb) is a Croatian auto racing driver.

== Career ==
=== Early years ===
Čolak started racing in karting with much of his young career was spent in Germany, including Formula Renault 2.0 Germany and the German SEAT Leon Cupra Cup. He also competed in some races of the Formula Renault 2000 Eurocup in 2001 and 2002. In 2008, he competed in the new SEAT León Eurocup, where he ended the year as runner-up.

=== Accident ===
In November 2010, according to Croatian reports, Čolak was involved in a road accident in Croatia. The reports say that a female passenger, Ivana Opak (20), was killed in the crash. Čolak escaped with minor injuries. In 2016, he was sentenced to six years in jail for this deadly crash.

=== World Touring Car Championship ===
As a reward for winning a race at Brands Hatch, Čolak was entered in two rounds of the FIA World Touring Car Championship with the SEAT backed SUNRED Engineering team.

For 2009, Čolak entered the WTCC for a full season with an independent petrol powered SEAT Leon, under the Croatia Čolak Ingra Seat banner.

== Racing record ==
=== Complete World Touring Car Championship results ===
(key) (Races in bold indicate pole position) (Races in italics indicate fastest lap)

Year	Team	Car	1	2	3	4	5	6	7	8	9	10	11	12	13	14	15	16	17	18	19	20	21	22	23	24	DC	Points
2008	SUNRED Engineering	SEAT León TFSI	BRA; 1	BRA; 2	MEX; 1	MEX; 2	ESP; 1	ESP; 2	FRA; 1	FRA; 2	CZE; 1	CZE; 2	POR; 1	POR; 2	GBR; 1	GBR; 2	GER; 1; 13	GER; 2; 17	EUR; 1	EUR; 2	ITA; 1	ITA; 2	JPN; 1	JPN; 2	MAC; 1	MAC; 2	27th	0
2009	Čolak Racing Team Ingra	SEAT León 2.0 TFSI	BRA; 1; 19	BRA; 2 DNS	MEX; 1 Ret	MEX; 2; 22	MAR; 1; 15	MAR; 2; 12	FRA; 1; 19	FRA; 2; 16	ESP; 1; 18	ESP; 2; 18	CZE; 1 Ret	CZE; 2 DNS	POR; 1	POR; 2	GBR; 1	GBR; 2	GER; 1; 11	GER; 2; 21	ITA; 1	ITA; 2	JPN; 1	JPN; 2	MAC; 1	MAC; 2	NC	0
