= 2009 FIA WTCC Race of Spain =

Race details
- Round 5 of 12 in the 2009 World Touring Car Championship at Circuit de la Comunitat Valenciana Ricardo Tormo in Valencia, Spain.
- Date: 31 May, 2009
- Location: Valencia, Spain
- Course: Circuit de la Comunitat Valenciana Ricardo Tormo; 4.051 kilometres (2.517 mi)

Race One
- Laps: 13
Pole position
Driver		(Italy) Gabriele Tarquini	SEAT Sport
Time		1:44.414	
Podium
First		(France) Yvan Muller	SEAT Sport
Second		(Portugal) Tiago Monteiro	SEAT Sport
Third		(Italy) Gabriele Tarquini	SEAT Sport
Fastest Lap
Driver		(France) Yvan Muller	SEAT Sport
Time		1:45.735	

Race Two
- Laps: 13
Podium
First		(Brazil) Augusto Farfus	BMW Team Germany
Second		(Germany) Jörg Müller	BMW Team Germany
Third		(Italy) Gabriele Tarquini	SEAT Sport
Fastest Lap
Driver		(Brazil) Augusto Farfus	BMW Team Germany
Time		1:45.974	

The FIA WTCC Race of Spain 2009 was the fifth round of the 2009 World Touring Car Championship season and the fifth running of the FIA WTCC Race of Spain. It was held on 31 May 2009 at the Circuit Ricardo Tormo in Cheste, near Valencia in Spain. The first race was won by Gabriele Tarquini for SEAT Sport and the second race was won by Augusto Farfus for BMW Team Germany.

== Background ==
SEAT Sport driver Yvan Muller was leading the drivers' championship coming into the event, BMW driver Farfus was six points behind in second and Gabriele Tarquini was a further five points behind. Franz Engstler was leading the Yokohama Independents' Trophy with Félix Porteiro second.

Having missed the previous round at Pau due to damage sustained at the Race of Morocco, Vito Postiglione returned to the championship with Scuderia Proteam Motorsport.

After a disappointing performance at Pau, the SEAT León TDIs were given a 0.2 bar increase in boost pressure for the Race of Spain to return the diesels to competitive form.

== Report ==
=== Free Practice ===
Yvan Muller set the pace in the opening free practice session, the increase in boost pressure for the TDI engine produced a SEAT 1–2–3 result. Tom Coronel was the leading petrol car, Nicola Larini was the leading Chevrolet car and the heavier BMWs were led by Farfus in ninth.

SEAT stayed on top in the second practice session, this time courtesy of Tiago Monteiro. Farfus was second for BMW and Larini was third for Chevrolet. Jaap van Lagen did not participate in the session, as the engine was changed in his LADA Sport Lada 110 2.0. The session was interrupted with a red flag when Jordi Gené went off the circuit and left gravel on the track.

=== Qualifying ===
Tarquini set pole position on his final timed lap, to achieve his first pole since the 2007 Race of Germany. SEAT Sport locked out the first two rows of the grid at their home event with Yvan Muller second, Gené third and Monteiro fourth. SEAT driver Rickard Rydell was fastest in Q1 at the head of a 1–2–3 for the marque, while Farfus was the only BMW to escape Q1. All three Chevrolet drivers progressed to Q2 while both LADAs lined up near the back of the grid. With SEAT claiming the first four positions in Q2, Farfus separated them from the leading Chevrolet of Alain Menu. SUNRED Engineering's Tom Coronel was the only independent driver to make it into Q2, and he lined up tenth for the first race.

=== Warm-Up ===
Rydell was fastest in Sunday morning warm up session with pole sitter Tarquini thirteenth.

=== Race One ===
Yvan Muller made a good start to take the lead from Tarquini straight away, while Monteiro also passed Tarquini to finish second. Having dropped out in Q1, triple champion Andy Priaulx battled through from fourteenth to fifth while the leading BMW of Farfus had a difficult race amongst the SEATs. He recovered after Gené pushed him wide, he then dropped down to seventh when he was involved in a tangle with Rydell, Menu and Gené but he then climbed up the order to claim fourth. This was helped by Jörg Müller dropping two places at the final corner. Coronel was the independent winner having finished seventh while further down the order, BMW Team Italy-Spain driver Sergio Hernández and Wiechers-Sport's Stefano D'Aste battled over the eighth place which would become pole position for race two, with Hernández coming out victorious.

=== Race Two ===
The second race saw a 1–2 finish for BMW Team Germany, with Farfus winning and Jörg Müller second. Jörg Müller had started from third and took the lead of the race which he held until the third lap, when Farfus assumed the race lead. The leading pair distanced themselves from the rest of the field which was being led by Tarquini and Priaulx in the battle for the third and final podium spot. Ultimately, it was Tarquini to finish third, to deny BMW a 1–2–3 finish. Coronel started on the front row but could not match the start of the rear-wheel drive BMW of pole sitter Hernández. Coronel finished tenth and Hernández sixth, while D'Aste took the independent win with ninth place.

== Results ==
=== Qualifying ===
Pos.	No.	Name	Team	Car	C	Q1	Q2
1	2	(Italy) Gabriele Tarquini	SEAT Sport	SEAT León 2.0 TDI		1:45.888	1:44.414
2	1	(France) Yvan Muller	SEAT Sport	SEAT León 2.0 TDI		1:45.516	1:44.646
3	4	(Spain) Jordi Gené	SEAT Sport	SEAT León 2.0 TDI		1:45.790	1:44.826
4	5	(Portugal) Tiago Monteiro	SEAT Sport	SEAT León 2.0 TDI		1:45.542	1:44.896
5	8	(Brazil) Augusto Farfus	BMW Team Germany	BMW 320si		1:45.638	1:45.080
6	12	(Switzerland) Alain Menu	Chevrolet	Chevrolet Cruze LT		1:45.681	1:45.314
7	11	(United Kingdom) Robert Huff	Chevrolet	Chevrolet Cruze LT		1:46.038	1:45.440
8	3	(Sweden) Rickard Rydell	SEAT Sport	SEAT León 2.0 TDI		1:45.424	1:45.538
9	14	(Italy) Nicola Larini	Chevrolet	Chevrolet Cruze LT		1:45.854	1:45.702
10	21	(Netherlands) Tom Coronel	SUNRED Engineering	SEAT León 2.0 TFSI	Y	1:45.949	no time set
11	7	(Germany) Jörg Müller	BMW Team Germany	BMW 320si		1:46.126	
12	9	(Italy) Alessandro Zanardi	BMW Team Italy-Spain	BMW 320si		1:46.221	
13	10	(Spain) Sergio Hernández	BMW Team Italy-Spain	BMW 320si		1:46.250	
14	6	(United Kingdom) Andy Priaulx	BMW Team UK	BMW 320si		1:46.331	
15	23	(Spain) Félix Porteiro	Scuderia Proteam Motorsport	BMW 320si	Y	1:46.426	
16	27	(Italy) Stefano D'Aste	Wiechers-Sport	BMW 320si	Y	1:46.525	
17	30	(Morocco) Mehdi Bennani	Exagon Engineering	SEAT León 2.0 TFSI	Y	1:46.615	
18	28	(Croatia) Marin Čolak	Čolak Racing Team Ingra	SEAT León 2.0 TFSI	Y	1:46.633	
19	22	(United Kingdom) Tom Boardman	SUNRED Engineering	SEAT León 2.0 TFSI	Y	1:47.439	
20	31	(Italy) Vito Postiglione	Scuderia Proteam Motorsport	BMW 320si	Y	1:47.462	
21	25	(Germany) Franz Engstler	Liqui Moly Team Engstler	BMW 320si	Y	1:47.547	
22	20	(Russia) Viktor Shapovalov	LADA Sport	LADA 110 2.0		1:47.901	
23	26	(Denmark) Kristian Poulsen	Liqui Moly Team Engstler	BMW 320si	Y	1:48.492	
24	19	(Russia) Kirill Ladygin	LADA Sport	LADA 110 2.0		1:48.530	
107% time: 1:52.823
—	18	(Netherlands) Jaap van Lagen	LADA Sport	LADA 110 2.0		12:23.222	

=== Race 1 ===
Pos.	No.	Name	Team	Car	C	Laps	Time/Retired	Grid	Points
1	1	(France) **Yvan Muller**	SEAT Sport	SEAT León 2.0 TDI		13	23:13.675	2	10
2	5	(Portugal) Tiago Monteiro	SEAT Sport	SEAT León 2.0 TDI		13	+1.884	4	8
3	2	(Italy) Gabriele Tarquini	SEAT Sport	SEAT León 2.0 TDI		13	+4.157	1	6
4	8	(Brazil) Augusto Farfus	BMW Team Germany	BMW 320si		13	+5.364	5	5
5	6	(United Kingdom) Andy Priaulx	BMW Team UK	BMW 320si		13	+5.855	14	4
6	7	(Germany) Jörg Müller	BMW Team Germany	BMW 320si		13	+5.943	11	3
7	21	(Netherlands) Tom Coronel	SUNRED Engineering	SEAT León 2.0 TFSI	Y	13	+8.096	10	2
8	10	(Spain) Sergio Hernández	BMW Team Italy-Spain	BMW 320si		13	+12.106	13	1
9	27	(Italy) Stefano D'Aste	Wiechers-Sport	BMW 320si	Y	13	+13.301	16	
10	23	(Spain) Félix Porteiro	Scuderia Proteam Motorsport	BMW 320si	Y	13	+15.846	15	
11	14	(Italy) Nicola Larini	Chevrolet	Chevrolet Cruze LT		13	+16.461	9	
12	9	(Italy) Alessandro Zanardi	BMW Team Italy-Spain	BMW 320si		13	+22.528	12	
13	3	(Sweden) Rickard Rydell	SEAT Sport	SEAT León 2.0 TDI		13	+23.038	8	
14	30	(Morocco) Mehdi Bennani	Exagon Engineering	SEAT León 2.0 TFSI	Y	13	+25.385	17	
15	12	(Switzerland) Alain Menu	Chevrolet	Chevrolet Cruze LT		13	+26.381	6	
16	25	(Germany) Franz Engstler	Liqui Moly Team Engstler	BMW 320si	Y	13	+32.002	21	
17	22	(United Kingdom) Tom Boardman	SUNRED Engineering	SEAT León 2.0 TFSI	Y	13	+33.042	19	
18	28	(Croatia) Marin Čolak	Čolak Racing Team Ingra	SEAT León 2.0 TFSI	Y	13	+33.730	18	
19	31	(Italy) Vito Postiglione	Scuderia Proteam Motorsport	BMW 320si	Y	13	+34.781	20	
20	20	(Russia) Viktor Shapovalov	LADA Sport	LADA 110 2.0		13	+38.341	24	
21	18	(Netherlands) Jaap van Lagen	LADA Sport	LADA 110 2.0		12	+1 Lap	25	
22	11	(United Kingdom) Robert Huff	Chevrolet	Chevrolet Cruze LT		12	+1 Lap	7	
Ret	19	(Russia) Kirill Ladygin	LADA Sport	LADA 110 2.0		7	Engine overheating	23	
Ret	26	(Denmark) Kristian Poulsen	Liqui Moly Team Engstler	BMW 320si	Y	1	Race incident	22	
Ret	4	(Spain) Jordi Gené	SEAT Sport	SEAT León 2.0 TDI		0	Race incident	3	

- **Bold** denotes Fastest lap.

=== Race 2 ===
Pos.	No.	Name	Team	Car	C	Laps	Time/Retired	Grid	Points
1	8	(Brazil) **Augusto Farfus**	BMW Team Germany	BMW 320si		13	23:16.075	5	10
2	7	(Germany) Jörg Müller	BMW Team Germany	BMW 320si		13	+0.540	3	8
3	2	(Italy) Gabriele Tarquini	SEAT Sport	SEAT León 2.0 TDI		13	+5.426	6	6
4	6	(United Kingdom) Andy Priaulx	BMW Team UK	BMW 320si		13	+5.884	4	5
5	9	(Italy) Alessandro Zanardi	BMW Team Italy-Spain	BMW 320si		13	+6.676	12	4
6	10	(Spain) Sergio Hernández	BMW Team Italy-Spain	BMW 320si		13	+7.178	1	3
7	1	(France) Yvan Muller	SEAT Sport	SEAT León 2.0 TDI		13	+11.169	8	2
8	5	(Portugal) Tiago Monteiro	SEAT Sport	SEAT León 2.0 TDI		13	+11.569	7	1
9	27	(Italy) Stefano D'Aste	Wiechers-Sport	BMW 320si	Y	13	+13.052	9	
10	21	(Netherlands) Tom Coronel	SUNRED Engineering	SEAT León 2.0 TFSI	Y	13	+16.936	2	
11	4	(Spain) Jordi Gené	SEAT Sport	SEAT León 2.0 TDI		13	+17.978	22	
12	12	(Switzerland) Alain Menu	Chevrolet	Chevrolet Cruze LT		13	+20.965	15	
13	14	(Italy) Nicola Larini	Chevrolet	Chevrolet Cruze LT		13	+23.139	11	
14	3	(Sweden) Rickard Rydell	SEAT Sport	SEAT León 2.0 TDI		13	+23.635	13	
15	23	(Spain) Félix Porteiro	Scuderia Proteam Motorsport	BMW 320si	Y	13	+24.470	10	
16	25	(Germany) Franz Engstler	Liqui Moly Team Engstler	BMW 320si	Y	13	+29.515	16	
17	31	(Italy) Vito Postiglione	Scuderia Proteam Motorsport	BMW 320si	Y	13	+32.556	19	
18	28	(Croatia) Marin Čolak	Čolak Racing Team Ingra	SEAT León 2.0 TFSI	Y	13	+33.721	18	
19	22	(United Kingdom) Tom Boardman	SUNRED Engineering	SEAT León 2.0 TFSI	Y	13	+34.859	17	
20	26	(Denmark) Kristian Poulsen	Liqui Moly Team Engstler	BMW 320si	Y	13	+35.793	23	
21	20	(Russia) Viktor Shapovalov	LADA Sport	LADA 110 2.0		13	+36.289	20	
22	11	(United Kingdom) Robert Huff	Chevrolet	Chevrolet Cruze LT		13	+43.503	21	
23	30	(Morocco) Mehdi Bennani	Exagon Engineering	SEAT León 2.0 TFSI	Y	13	+43.550	14	
24	19	(Russia) Kirill Ladygin	LADA Sport	LADA 110 2.0		13	+46.540	24	
Ret	18	(Netherlands) Jaap van Lagen	LADA Sport	LADA 110 2.0		3	Oil pressure	25	

- **Bold** denotes Fastest lap.

== Championship standings ==
Drivers' Championship standings

	Pos	Driver	Points
	1	(France) Yvan Muller	57
	2	(Brazil) Augusto Farfus	54
	3	(Italy) Gabriele Tarquini	46
2	4	(United Kingdom) Andy Priaulx	35
1	5	(United Kingdom) Robert Huff	32

Yokohama Independents' Trophy standings

	Pos	Driver	Points
2	1	(Netherlands) Tom Coronel	82
1	2	(Germany) Franz Engstler	80
	3	(Spain) Félix Porteiro	80
	4	(Italy) Stefano D'Aste	44
	5	(United Kingdom) Tom Boardman	28

Manufacturers' Championship standings

Pos	Manufacturer	Points
1	(Spain) SEAT	136
2	(Germany) BMW	120
3	(United States) Chevrolet	96
4	(Russia) Lada	35

- Note: Only the top five positions are included for both sets of drivers' standings.
