= 2008 SEAT León Eurocup =

Seasons
- ← none 2009 →

The 2008 SEAT León Eurocup was the first season of the SEAT León Eurocup, a one-make racing series supporting the World Touring Car Championship. The best classified driver at each event was rewarded with a drive in a SUNRED Engineering–run SEAT León TFSI at the next round of the WTCC.

Oscar Nogués won the championship tied on 47 points with Marin Čolak, winning by having three race wins to Čolak's two.

== Teams and drivers ==
Team	No.	Drivers	Rounds
(Spain) SUNRED	1	(Spain) Oscar Nogués	1, 3–6
(Spain) SUNRED	7	(Czech Republic) Michal Matějovský	All
(Spain) SUNRED	17	(Spain) Diego Puyo	All
(Spain) SUNRED	18	(Spain) Adrián Matheu	All
(Spain) SUNRED	27	(United Kingdom) James Nash	All
(Spain) SUNRED	31	(Spain) Javier Ibran	1, 6
(United Kingdom) Special Tuning	2	(United Kingdom) Tom Boardman	1–2, 4–6
(United Kingdom) Special Tuning	29	(United Kingdom) Liam McMillan	1, 4
(Italy) Rangoni Motorsport	3	(Italy) Massimiliano Pedalà	All
(Italy) Rangoni Motorsport	12	(Italy) Davide Roda	1–4, 6
(Italy) Rangoni Motorsport	22	(Italy) Flavio Berto	All
(Italy) Rangoni Motorsport	23	(Italy) Alan Simoni	All
(Italy) Rangoni Motorsport	86	(Netherlands) Tim Coronel	5
(Hungary) Zengő Motorsport	4	(Hungary) Gábor Wéber	All
(Hungary) Zengő Motorsport	5	(Hungary) György Kontra	3, 6
(Hungary) Zengő Motorsport	6	(Hungary) Norbert Michelisz	All
(Italy) PRS Group Speed Racing	8	(Italy) Andrea Larini	All
(Italy) PRS Group Speed Racing	11	(Italy) Manuel Flaminio	All
(Italy) PRS Group Speed Racing	15	(Republic of Ireland) Eoin Murray	All
(France) Team Clairet Sport	9	(France) Jean-Marie Clairet	All
(Switzerland) SEAT Swiss Racing	10	(Switzerland) Fredy Barth	All
(Switzerland) SEAT Swiss Racing	14	(Switzerland) Urs Sonderegger	6
(Spain) Valvoline Ashland Racing	16	(Spain) Antonio Aristi	All
(Spain) Valvoline Ashland Racing	62	(Spain) Luis Recuenco	4–6
(Spain) Team Elias	19	(Spain) Fernando Navarrete	1
(Spain) Team Elias	29	(Spain) Rafael Villanueva	3, 5–6
(Portugal) Bastos Sport	20	(Portugal) Lourenço Beirão da Veiga	1–3
(Portugal) Bastos Sport	21	(Portugal) Duarte Félix da Costa	1–5
(France) Exagon Engineering	24	(France) Jean-Robert Niogret	2
(Croatia) Čolak Racing Team	26	(Croatia) Marin Čolak	1–4, 6
(France) MCTPE	32	(France) Martin Morente	1–2, 5–6
(Spain) ST Racing (Spain) Harriet Arruabarrena	34	(Spain) Harriet Arruabarrena	2, 6
(Portugal) Oasis Motorsport	40	(Portugal) Miguel Freitas	3
(Portugal) Oasis Motorsport	41	(Portugal) Francisco Fino	3
(Portugal) PubliRacing	42	(Portugal) Francisco Carvalho	3
(Portugal) João Pina Cardoso	43	(Portugal) João Pina Cardoso	3
(Italy) Italian Racing Motors	50	(Italy) Aldo Ponti	6
(Spain) DKM Motorsport	50	(Russia) Oleg Petrikov	2–6
(Russia) Oleg Petrikov	61	(Russia) Oleg Petrikov	1
(Russia) Dynamo SEAT Racing Team	85	(Russia) Anton Markin	All
(Spain) Team CMC Motor–Bricofer	93	(Italy) Marsilio Canuti	All
(Spain) SEAT Sport	99	(France) Sébastien Bernard	6

== Race calendar and results ==
Round		Circuit	Date	Pole position	Fastest lap	Winning driver	Winning team
1	R1	(Spain) Circuit Ricardo Tormo, Cheste	17 May	(Croatia) Marin Čolak	(Croatia) Marin Čolak	(Spain) Oscar Nogués	(Spain) SUNRED
1	R2	(Spain) Circuit Ricardo Tormo, Cheste	18 May		(Portugal) Lourenço Beirão da Veiga	(Republic of Ireland) Eoin Murray	(Italy) PRS Group Speed Racing
2	R1	(France) Circuit de Pau-Ville	31 May	(United Kingdom) Tom Boardman	(United Kingdom) Tom Boardman	(United Kingdom) Tom Boardman	(United Kingdom) Special Tuning
2	R2	(France) Circuit de Pau-Ville	1 June		(Hungary) Gábor Wéber	(Hungary) Gábor Wéber	(Hungary) Zengő Motorsport
3	R1	(Portugal) Autódromo do Estoril	12 July	(Hungary) Norbert Michelisz	(Spain) Oscar Nogués	(Croatia) Marin Čolak	(Croatia) Čolak Racing Team
3	R2	(Portugal) Autódromo do Estoril	13 July		(Portugal) Lourenço Beirão da Veiga	(Portugal) Lourenço Beirão da Veiga	(Portugal) Bastos Sport
4	R1	(United Kingdom) Brands Hatch, Kent	26 July	(Hungary) Norbert Michelisz	(United Kingdom) Tom Boardman	(Republic of Ireland) Eoin Murray	(Italy) PRS Group Speed Racing
4	R2	(United Kingdom) Brands Hatch, Kent	27 July		(Spain) Diego Puyo	(Croatia) Marin Čolak	(Croatia) Čolak Racing Team
5	R1	(Germany) Motorsport Arena Oschersleben	30 August	(Hungary) Norbert Michelisz	(Czech Republic) Michal Matějovský	(Spain) Oscar Nogués	(Spain) SUNRED
5	R2	(Germany) Motorsport Arena Oschersleben	31 August		(Italy) Massimiliano Pedalà	(Italy) Massimiliano Pedalà	(Italy) Rangoni Motorsport
6	R1	(Italy) Autodromo Nazionale Monza	4 October	(Hungary) Norbert Michelisz	(Croatia) Marin Čolak	(Hungary) Norbert Michelisz	(Hungary) Zengő Motorsport
6	R2	(Italy) Autodromo Nazionale Monza	5 October		(Croatia) Marin Čolak	(Spain) Oscar Nogués	(Spain) SUNRED

== Championship standings ==
Pos	Driver	VAL (Spain)		PAU (France)		EST (Portugal)		BRH (United Kingdom)		OSC (Germany)		MNZ (Italy)		Pts
1	(Spain) Oscar Nogués	1	2			22	8	18	10	1	8	2	1	47
2	(Croatia) Marin Čolak	**Ret**	4	2	Ret	1	13	5	1			7	2	47
3	(Republic of Ireland) Eoin Murray	8	**1**	Ret	9	13	6	1	7	4	5	Ret	8	37
4	(Italy) Massimiliano Pedalà	3	13	10	Ret	7	2	Ret	9	9	1	5	3	36
5	(United Kingdom) James Nash	14	6	9	5	9	14	2	4	2	Ret	4	6	36
6	(United Kingdom) Tom Boardman	Ret	5	**1**	4			15	6	7	Ret	3	4	35
7	(France) Jean-Marie Clairet	Ret	9	7	2	3	15	3	5	10	6	6	22	32
8	(Spain) Diego Puyo	4	11	3	Ret	2	3	6	16	8	**13**	9	7	31
9	(Portugal) Duarte Félix da Costa	2	8	5	15	6	5	17	Ret	6	2			31
10	(Portugal) Lourenço Beirão da Veiga	12	18	6	6	4	1							21
11	(Hungary) Gábor Wéber	16	3	8	**1**	23	9	Ret	Ret	17	16	Ret	DNS	19
12	(Italy) Alan Simoni	18	7	19	11	8	**7**	4	2			16	14	19
13	(Spain) Rafael Villanueva					5	4			5	3	Ret	DNS	19
14	(Hungary) Norbert Michelisz	11	Ret	12	7	**25**	16	**Ret**	16	**Ret**	7	**1**	5	18
15	(Italy) Andrea Larini	Ret	Ret	4	3	Ret	DNS	8	**3**			Ret	Ret	18
16	(Czech Republic) Michal Matějovský	13	20	13	Ret	10	21	Ret	Ret	3	Ret	19	Ret	6
17	(Switzerland) Fredy Barth	Ret	10	Ret	Ret	21	12	Ret	Ret	16	4	Ret	10	5
18	(Spain) Antonio Aristi	5	17	Ret	13	15	10	11	Ret	Ret	12	Ret	Ret	5
19	(United Kingdom) Liam McMillan	6	Ret					12	8					4
20	(Spain) Javier Ibrán	7	Ret									13	Ret	2
21	(Italy) Manuel Flaminio	15	12	20	Ret	18	18	7	14	Ret	19	17	9	2
22	(Italy) Flavio Berto	17	16	11	8	Ret	DNS	9	Ret	11	11	8	**13**	2
—	(Spain) Harriet Arruabarrena			16	14							14	12	0
—	(France) Sébastien Bernard											21	21	0
—	(Italy) Marsilio Canuti	Ret	14	14	10	11	Ret	13	12	12	9	Ret	11	0
—	(Portugal) João Pina Cardoso					16	19							0
—	(Portugal) Francisco Carvalho					Ret	DNS							0
—	(Netherlands) Tim Coronel									Ret	10			0
—	(Portugal) Francisco Fino					20	11							0
—	(Portugal) Miguel Freitas					14	23							0
—	(Hungary) György Kontra					Ret	20					22	19	0
—	(Russia) Anton Markin	10	21	15	Ret	19	25	16	15	15	17	11	16	0
—	(Spain) Adrián Matheu	9	15	Ret	16	12	22	10	11	Ret	14	Ret	15	0
—	(France) Martin Morente	Ret	Ret	Ret	Ret					Ret	Ret	23	20	0
—	(Spain) Fernando Navarrete	Ret	Ret											0
—	(France) Jean-Robert Niogret			DNS	DNS									0
—	(Russia) Oleg Petrikov	Ret	22	17	12	17	17	Ret	13	14	15	20	17	0
—	(Italy) Aldo Ponti											10	Ret	0
—	(Spain) Luis Recuenco							Ret	Ret	13	18	12	23	0
—	(Italy) Davide Roda	19	19	18	Ret	24	24	14	Ret			15	Ret	0
—	(Switzerland) Urs Sonderegger											18	18	0
Pos	Driver	VAL (Spain)		PAU (France)		EST (Portugal)		BRH (United Kingdom)		OSC (Germany)		MNZ (Italy)		Pts

Colour	Result
Gold	Winner
Silver	Second place
Bronze	Third place
Green	Points classification
Blue	Non-points classification
Blue	Non-classified finish (NC)
Purple	Retired, not classified (Ret)
Red	Did not qualify (DNQ)
Red	Did not pre-qualify (DNPQ)
Black	Disqualified (DSQ)
White	Did not start (DNS)
White	Withdrew (WD)
White	Race cancelled (C)
Blank	Did not practice (DNP)
Blank	Did not arrive (DNA)
Blank	Excluded (EX)

**Bold** – Pole
Italics – Fastest Lap
