= 2009 FIA WTCC Race of the Czech Republic =

Race details
- Round 6 of 12 in the 2009 World Touring Car Championship at Masaryk Circuit in Brno, Czech Republic.
- Date: 21 June, 2009
- Location: Brno, Czech Republic
- Course: Masaryk Circuit; 5.403 kilometres (3.357 mi)

Race One
- Laps: 12
Pole position
Driver		(Brazil) Augusto Farfus	BMW Team Germany
Time		2:09.590	
Podium
First		(Italy) Alex Zanardi	BMW Team Italy-Spain
Second		(Germany) Jörg Müller	BMW Team Germany
Third		(Italy) Gabriele Tarquini	SEAT Sport
Fastest Lap
Driver		(United Kingdom) Andy Priaulx	BMW Team UK
Time		2:10.622	

Race Two
- Laps: 10
Podium
First		(Spain) Sergio Hernández	BMW Team Italy-Spain
Second		(France) Yvan Muller	SEAT Sport
Third		(Portugal) Tiago Monteiro	SEAT Sport
Fastest Lap
Driver		(Spain) Sergio Hernández	BMW Team Italy-Spain
Time		2:12.143	

The 2009 FIA WTCC Marriott Race of the Czech Republic was the sixth round of the 2009 World Touring Car Championship season and the fourth running of the FIA WTCC Race of the Czech Republic. It was held on 21 June 2009 at the Masaryk Circuit near Brno, Czech Republic. BMW Team Italy-Spain won both races with Alex Zanardi winning the first race and Sergio Hernández winning the second race.

== Background ==
Coming into the round, SEAT Sport driver Yvan Muller was leading the drivers' championship by a three-point margin over BMW Team Germany's Augusto Farfus. Tom Coronel was leading the Yokohama Independents' Trophy.

Tom's twin brother Tim Coronel joined SUNRED Engineering for the event to make his WTCC debut. Exagon Engineering and their driver Mehdi Bennani missed the round before returning at the Race of Portugal.

== Report ==
=== Free practice ===
BMW cars dominated first practice taking the top five positions on Saturday morning. In wet conditions, Andy Priaulx was fastest just under 0.15s ahead of Zanardi. Rickard Rydell was the fastest SEAT drive in sixth place and the fastest Chevrolet was that of Nicola Larini in seventh.

BMW filled the top four places in the second free practice session with Farfus setting the fastest time. SEAT cars filled the next five places, led by Gabriele Tarquini while the fastest Chevrolet was Robert Huff in tenth. The track was still damp after the morning but it was drying as the session progressed.

=== Qualifying ===
Farfus took his third pole position of the year with Priaulx alongside him on the front row. Behind them were Zanardi and the fastest Chevrolet of Larini. Only two SEATs made it through to Q2, Rydell lined up fifth and Tarquini sixth. Scuderia Proteam Motorsport driver Félix Porteiro was the fastest independent lining up tenth. Priaulx had been fastest in Q1 but changing weather conditions favoured Farfus later on. Out in Q1 were SEAT Sport drivers Tiago Monteiro, Jordi Gené and points leader Yvan Muller.

=== Warm-Up ===
Farfus was quickest in Sunday mornings warm up session with BMW cars in the top five positions.

=== Race One ===
Farfus moved to the left at the start, collecting Priaulx, Huff, Larini and Gené before beaching himself in the gravel trap. Priaulx limped back to the pits minus his front bumper and with broken front suspension while Farfus, Huff and Larini were stuck at turn one. The incident allowed Tarquini and Zanardi to pass up the inside and continue. Tarquini led away from the restart before Zanardi quickly passed the SEAT and pulled away into the lead. Zanardi took victory at Brno for the second consecutive year while Jörg Müller had climbed up from eleventh to second ahead of Tarquini. Porteiro was the winning Yokohama Independent driver and Yvan Muller finished eighth to secure pole position for race two.

=== Race Two ===
Starting on the front row, Porteiro moved into the lead at the start while Hernández then took second from pole sitter Yvan Muller. The leading pair ran close together and on lap three Hernández made his move to take the lead. Porteiro dropped down to fourth on lap four when he was passed by Muller and Monteiro. Behind them, a battle for fifth place was developing between BMW pair Priaulx and Müller and SEAT pair Tarquini and Rydell. While the BMW duo were contesting fifth place, Tarquini and Rydell overtook the pair of them. At the line Hernández took his first ever WTCC win with Muller second and Monteiro third, fourth place for Porteiro secured him the independents' win.

== Results ==
=== Qualifying ===
Pos.	No.	Name	Team	Car	C	Q1	Q2
1	8	(Brazil) Augusto Farfus	BMW Team Germany	BMW 320si		2:10.663	2:09.590
2	6	(United Kingdom) Andy Priaulx	BMW Team UK	BMW 320si		2:09.644	2:09.630
3	9	(Italy) Alessandro Zanardi	BMW Team Italy-Spain	BMW 320si		2:10.826	2:09.862
4	14	(Italy) Nicola Larini	Chevrolet	Chevrolet Cruze LT		2:10.822	2:10.327
5	3	(Sweden) Rickard Rydell	SEAT Sport	SEAT León 2.0 TDI		2:10.604	2:10.371
6	2	(Italy) Gabriele Tarquini	SEAT Sport	SEAT León 2.0 TDI		2:10.601	2:10.617
7	7	(Germany) Jörg Müller	BMW Team Germany	BMW 320si		2:10.424	2:10.661
8	12	(Switzerland) Alain Menu	Chevrolet	Chevrolet Cruze LT		2:10.730	2:10.714
9	10	(Spain) Sergio Hernández	BMW Team Italy-Spain	BMW 320si		2:10.628	2:10.996
10	23	(Spain) Félix Porteiro	Scuderia Proteam Motorsport	BMW 320si	Y	2:10.981	2:11.011
11	5	(Portugal) Tiago Monteiro	SEAT Sport	SEAT León 2.0 TDI		2:11.020	
12	4	(Spain) Jordi Gené	SEAT Sport	SEAT León 2.0 TDI		2:11.317	
13	1	(France) Yvan Muller	SEAT Sport	SEAT León 2.0 TDI		2:11.320	
14	11	(United Kingdom) Robert Huff	Chevrolet	Chevrolet Cruze LT		2:11.391	
15	27	(Italy) Stefano D'Aste	Wiechers-Sport	BMW 320si	Y	2:11.504	
16	21	(Netherlands) Tom Coronel	SUNRED Engineering	SEAT León 2.0 TFSI	Y	2:11.851	
17	25	(Germany) Franz Engstler	Liqui Moly Team Engstler	BMW 320si	Y	2:11.895	
18	31	(Italy) Vito Postiglione	Scuderia Proteam Motorsport	BMW 320si	Y	2:12.141	
19	28	(Croatia) Marin Čolak	Čolak Racing Team Ingra	SEAT León 2.0 TFSI	Y	2:12.469	
20	32	(Netherlands) Tim Coronel	SUNRED Engineering	SEAT León 2.0 TFSI	Y	2:12.490	
21	22	(United Kingdom) Tom Boardman	SUNRED Engineering	SEAT León 2.0 TFSI	Y	2:13.048	
22	18	(Netherlands) Jaap van Lagen	LADA Sport	LADA 110 2.0		2:13.371	
23	26	(Denmark) Kristian Poulsen	Liqui Moly Team Engstler	BMW 320si	Y	2:13.808	
24	19	(Russia) Kirill Ladygin	LADA Sport	LADA 110 2.0		2:14.033	
25	20	(Russia) Viktor Shapovalov	LADA Sport	LADA 110 2.0		2:14.257	

=== Race 1 ===
Pos.	No.	Name	Team	Car	C	Laps	Time/Retired	Grid	Points
1	9	(Italy) Alessandro Zanardi	BMW Team Italy-Spain	BMW 320si		12	2:26.496	3	10
2	7	(Germany) Jörg Müller	BMW Team Germany	BMW 320si		12	+1.848	7	8
3	2	(Italy) Gabriele Tarquini	SEAT Sport	SEAT León 2.0 TDI		12	+4.831	6	6
4	3	(Sweden) Rickard Rydell	SEAT Sport	SEAT León 2.0 TDI		12	+5.105	5	5
5	10	(Spain) Sergio Hernández	BMW Team Italy-Spain	BMW 320si		12	+5.303	9	4
6	5	(Portugal) Tiago Monteiro	SEAT Sport	SEAT León 2.0 TDI		12	+7.250	11	3
7	23	(Spain) Félix Porteiro	Scuderia Proteam Motorsport	BMW 320si	Y	12	+7.847	10	2
8	1	(France) Yvan Muller	SEAT Sport	SEAT León 2.0 TDI		12	+9.915	13	1
9	21	(Netherlands) Tom Coronel	SUNRED Engineering	SEAT León 2.0 TFSI	Y	12	+10.814	16	
10	31	(Italy) Vito Postiglione	Scuderia Proteam Motorsport	BMW 320si	Y	12	+11.022	18	
11	25	(Germany) Franz Engstler	Liqui Moly Team Engstler	BMW 320si	Y	12	+12.916	17	
12	32	(Netherlands) Tim Coronel	SUNRED Engineering	SEAT León 2.0 TFSI	Y	12	+14.150	20	
13	22	(United Kingdom) Tom Boardman	SUNRED Engineering	SEAT León 2.0 TFSI	Y	12	+17.692	21	
14	18	(Netherlands) Jaap van Lagen	LADA Sport	LADA 110 2.0		12	+20.200	22	
15	19	(Russia) Kirill Ladygin	LADA Sport	LADA 110 2.0		12	+22.342	24	
16	20	(Russia) Viktor Shapovalov	LADA Sport	LADA 110 2.0		12	+24.607	25	
17	27	(Italy) Stefano D'Aste	Wiechers-Sport	BMW 320si	Y	12	+36.106	15	
Ret	28	(Croatia) Marin Čolak	Čolak Racing Team Ingra	SEAT León 2.0 TFSI	Y	7	Pierced radiator	19	
NC	6	(United Kingdom) **Andy Priaulx**	BMW Team UK	BMW 320si		6	Race incident	2	
Ret	4	(Spain) Jordi Gené	SEAT Sport	SEAT León 2.0 TDI		4	Race incident	12	
Ret	26	(Denmark) Kristian Poulsen	Liqui Moly Team Engstler	BMW 320si	Y	2	Engine	23	
Ret	12	(Switzerland) Alain Menu	Chevrolet	Chevrolet Cruze LT		1	Race incident	8	
Ret	8	(Brazil) Augusto Farfus	BMW Team Germany	BMW 320si		0	Race incident	1	
Ret	14	(Italy) Nicola Larini	Chevrolet	Chevrolet Cruze LT		0	Race incident	4	
Ret	11	(United Kingdom) Robert Huff	Chevrolet	Chevrolet Cruze LT		0	Race incident	14	

- **Bold** denotes Fastest lap.

=== Race 2 ===
Pos.	No.	Name	Team	Car	C	Laps	Time/Retired	Grid	Points
1	10	(Spain) **Sergio Hernández**	BMW Team Italy-Spain	BMW 320si		10	22:13.734	4	10
2	1	(France) Yvan Muller	SEAT Sport	SEAT León 2.0 TDI		10	+2.316	1	8
3	5	(Portugal) Tiago Monteiro	SEAT Sport	SEAT León 2.0 TDI		10	+4.114	3	6
4	23	(Spain) Félix Porteiro	Scuderia Proteam Motorsport	BMW 320si	Y	10	+4.280	2	5
5	2	(Italy) Gabriele Tarquini	SEAT Sport	SEAT León 2.0 TDI		10	+7.232	6	4
6	3	(Sweden) Rickard Rydell	SEAT Sport	SEAT León 2.0 TDI		10	+7.857	5	3
7	7	(Germany) Jörg Müller	BMW Team Germany	BMW 320si		10	+8.092	7	2
8	6	(United Kingdom) Andy Priaulx	BMW Team UK	BMW 320si		10	+8.852	17	1
9	21	(Netherlands) Tom Coronel	SUNRED Engineering	SEAT León 2.0 TFSI	Y	10	+10.369	9	
10	31	(Italy) Vito Postiglione	Scuderia Proteam Motorsport	BMW 320si	Y	10	+10.551	10	
11	4	(Spain) Jordi Gené	SEAT Sport	SEAT León 2.0 TDI		10	+12.501	18	
12	11	(United Kingdom) Robert Huff	Chevrolet	Chevrolet Cruze LT		10	+16.026	19	
13	14	(Italy) Nicola Larini	Chevrolet	Chevrolet Cruze LT		10	+17.624	21	
14	25	(Germany) Franz Engstler	Liqui Moly Team Engstler	BMW 320si	Y	10	+18.456	11	
15	27	(Italy) Stefano D'Aste	Wiechers-Sport	BMW 320si	Y	10	+19.352	23	
16	32	(Netherlands) Tim Coronel	SUNRED Engineering	SEAT León 2.0 TFSI	Y	10	+19.916	12	
17	19	(Russia) Kirill Ladygin	LADA Sport	LADA 110 2.0		10	+29.476	15	
18	18	(Netherlands) Jaap van Lagen	LADA Sport	LADA 110 2.0		10	+30.483	14	
19	22	(United Kingdom) Tom Boardman	SUNRED Engineering	SEAT León 2.0 TFSI	Y	10	+30.837	13	
20	20	(Russia) Viktor Shapovalov	LADA Sport	LADA 110 2.0		10	+31.362	16	
21	26	(Denmark) Kristian Poulsen	Liqui Moly Team Engstler	BMW 320si	Y	10	+42.121	25	
22	12	(Switzerland) Alain Menu	Chevrolet	Chevrolet Cruze LT		9	+1 Lap	22	
Ret	9	(Italy) Alessandro Zanardi	BMW Team Italy-Spain	BMW 320si		4	Race incident	8	
Ret	8	(Brazil) Augusto Farfus	BMW Team Germany	BMW 320si		1	Race incident	20	
DNS	28	(Croatia) Marin Čolak	Čolak Racing Team Ingra	SEAT León 2.0 TFSI	Y	0	Pierced radiator	24	

- **Bold** denotes Fastest lap.

== Championship standings ==
Drivers' Championship standings

	Pos	Driver	Points
	1	(France) Yvan Muller	66
1	2	(Italy) Gabriele Tarquini	56
1	3	(Brazil) Augusto Farfus	54
2	4	(Germany) Jörg Müller	41
2	5	(Sweden) Rickard Rydell	38

Yokohama Independents' Trophy standings

	Pos	Driver	Points
2	1	(Spain) Félix Porteiro	124
1	2	(Netherlands) Tom Coronel	98
1	3	(Germany) Franz Engstler	90
	4	(Italy) Stefano D'Aste	50
	5	(United Kingdom) Tom Boardman	32

Manufacturers' Championship standings

Pos	Manufacturer	Points
1	(Spain) SEAT	161
2	(Germany) BMW	153
3	(United States) Chevrolet	103
4	(Russia) Lada	45

- Note: Only the top five positions are included for both sets of drivers' standings.
