= 2009 FIA WTCC Race of France =

Race details
- Round 4 of 12 in the 2009 World Touring Car Championship at Circuit de Pau in Pau, France.
- Date: 17 May, 2009
- Location: Pau, France
- Course: Circuit de Pau; 2.769 kilometres (1.721 mi)

Race One
- Laps: 19
Pole position
Driver		(Brazil) Augusto Farfus	BMW Team Germany
Time		1:22.473	
Podium
First		(United Kingdom) Robert Huff	Chevrolet
Second		(Brazil) Augusto Farfus	BMW Team Germany
Third		(Germany) Jörg Müller	BMW Team Germany
Fastest Lap
Driver		(Spain) Sergio Hernández	BMW Team Italy-Spain
Time		1:24.005	

Race Two
- Laps: 18
Podium
First		(Switzerland) Alain Menu	Chevrolet
Second		(Brazil) Augusto Farfus	BMW Team Germany
Third		(United Kingdom) Robert Huff	Chevrolet
Fastest Lap
Driver		(Germany) Jörg Müller	BMW Team Germany
Time		1:23.448	

The 2009 FIA WTCC Race of France was the fourth round of the 2009 World Touring Car Championship season and the fifth running of the FIA WTCC Race of France. It was held on 17 May 2009 at the temporary Circuit de Pau street circuit in Pau, France. It was the headline event of the 2009 Pau Grand Prix. Both races were won by Chevrolet with Robert Huff winning race one and Alain Menu winning race two. The second race was notable for a collision between race leader Franz Engstler and the safety car at the end of the first lap.

== Background ==
Yvan Muller had established an outright lead in the drivers' championship after the previous round in Morocco, twelve points clear of SEAT Sport teammate Gabriele Tarquini. Félix Porteiro was leading the Yokohama Independents' Trophy.

SUNRED Engineering expanded to three cars for the Pau event, Tom Coronel was joined by Tom Boardman who returned after missing the previous round and former European Touring Car Championship driver Éric Cayrolle. With both George Tanev and Vito Postiglione being forced to miss the round, Scuderia Proteam Motorsport ran just one car for independents' championship leader Porteiro. Local French GT Championship regular Laurent Cazenave joined Wiechers-Sport for the weekend alongside full-time driver Stefano D'Aste.

== Report ==
=== Free practice ===
Jörg Müller was fastest in the first practice session, Augusto Farfus was second and Yvan Muller was third. Alain Menu was the fastest Chevrolet driver in sixth. The petrol SEAT cars were mainly faster than the SEAT Sport run diesel cars. Marin Čolak, Coronel and Boardman finished the session seventh, eighth and ninth ahead of Jordi Gené, Tiago Monteiro and Rickard Rydell.

BMW were quickest once again in free practice two, Andy Priaulx was quickest for BMW Team UK. He was ahead of morning pacesetters Müller and Farfus while Coronel in fourth was the fastest independent. Menu was fifth for Chevrolet and the fastest factory SEAT was Rydell fourteenth, one place behind the Lada of Jaap van Lagen.

=== Qualifying ===
Priaulx claimed his first pole position since the 2006 Guia Race of Macau. The BMW Team UK man was among the front runners during both practice sessions and qualifying and put in a time of 1:22.462 in Q2. He demoted BMW teammate Farfus by just 11 thousandths of a second. Coronel defied odds in taking part in Q2 after the front of his car was severely damaged in Q1. However, attention from his team and he lined up in third place.

While it was a BMW at the top of the timesheet for the majority of the Q1, on the last lap Huff and Chevrolet stormed through with a 1:22.900 stealing the quickest time away from Priaulx by 0.042 of a second. Jörg Müller (1:22.960) and Farfus (1:23.201) went into Q2 as third and fourth best. Coronel was sitting fifth at the end of Q1. However, at this time his team was repairing his car for Q2 after he incurred damage with seven minutes remaining. Leading man Huff's teammates Larini and Menu both made the cut after claiming the sixth and seventh best times. Independent drivers Porteiro and Engstler along with Sergio Hernández made up the top ten, narrowly denying Alessandro Zanardi and D’Aste progression into Q2. All the five SEAT Sport turbodiesel cars remained out of the Q2 for the first time.

In Q2, Coronel was the man to beat for the opening half of the session after he clocked a 1:22.917. However, Farfus knocked the Dutchman off provisional pole by a sturdy four tenths of a second. The Brazilian's time of 1:22.473 seemed good enough to set him up at the front for Race 1 until Priaulx bettered it by just 0.011 seconds. Coronel's time secured third place on the grid alongside Jörg Müller. A trio of Chevrolets followed from fifth to seventh; Huff (1:23.097), Menu (1:23.128) and Larini (1:23.282).

=== Warm-Up ===
Pole sitter Farfus was fastest in the warm–up session on Sunday morning with Jörg Müller second and Priaulx third.

=== Race One ===
Huff took his second win in three races for Chevrolet. The Briton got a great start from third and overtook Farfus who hit some oil and went wide at Pont Oscar on lap 2. Huff led the pack for the remaining 17 laps with Farfus and Jörg Müller having to settle for second and third despite applying constant pressure on the front man. Perseverance paid out for Priaulx who crossed the line fourth, having passed Menu on lap 12.

Spaniard Hernández made good progress in the second half of the race to secure fifth place overall with fellow countryman Porteiro winning the independent category in sixth overall, however he was eventually excluded by the stewards for hitting Coronel. Engstler inherited the independents’ victory and sixth place, while Menu came home eighth to start race two on pole.

=== Race Two ===
Chevrolet achieved their fourth consecutive win and this time it was Menu on the top podium spot. He was joined by teammate Huff who crossed the line third and Farfus from BMW Team Germany took second place just as in race one. The race was suspended when Engstler collided with the safety car. During the first lap Porteiro hit Hernández with the later not being able to rejoin. Porteiro was given a drive-through penalty.

Jörg Müller and Priaulx also made contact with each other in lap one. While Priaulx continued and crossed the line fourth, Müller received a drive-through penalty for pitting during the suspension of the race and finished 18th. Zanardi stormed through the pack to achieve fifth place and SEAT Sport men Gabriele Tarquini and Yvan Muller scored points in sixth and seventh. The race ended under the red flags with one lap remaining after Cayrolle and Larini, who were battling for eighth spot, were involved in a collision.

== Results ==
=== Qualifying ===
Pos.	No.	Name	Team	Car	C	Q1	Q2
1	8	(Brazil) Augusto Farfus	BMW Team Germany	BMW 320si		1:23.201	1:22.473
2	7	(Germany) Jörg Müller	BMW Team Germany	BMW 320si		1:22.960	1:23:051
3	25	(Germany) Franz Engstler	Liqui Moly Team Engstler	BMW 320si	Y	1:23.625	1:24.442
4^{1}	11	(United Kingdom) Robert Huff	Chevrolet	Chevrolet Cruze LT		1:22.900	excluded
5^{1}	6	(United Kingdom) Andy Priaulx	BMW Team UK	BMW 320si		1:22:942	excluded
6^{1}	21	(Netherlands) Tom Coronel	SUNRED Engineering	SEAT León 2.0 TFSI	Y	1:23.375	excluded
7^{1}	14	(Italy) Nicola Larini	Chevrolet	Chevrolet Cruze LT		1:23.425	excluded
8^{1}	12	(Switzerland) Alain Menu	Chevrolet	Chevrolet Cruze LT		1:23.516	excluded
9^{1}	23	(Spain) Félix Porteiro	Scuderia Proteam Motorsport	BMW 320si	Y	1:23.577	excluded
10^{1}	10	(Spain) Sergio Hernández	BMW Team Italy-Spain	BMW 320si		1:23.768	excluded
11	9	(Italy) Alessandro Zanardi	BMW Team Italy-Spain	BMW 320si		1:23.806	
12	28	(Croatia) Marin Čolak	Čolak Racing Team Ingra	SEAT León 2.0 TFSI	Y	1:23.815	
13	30	(Morocco) Mehdi Bennani	Exagon Engineering	SEAT León 2.0 TFSI	Y	1:23.929	
14	3	(Sweden) Rickard Rydell	SEAT Sport	SEAT León 2.0 TDI		1:24.118	
15^{2}	27	(Italy) Stefano D'Aste	Wiechers-Sport	BMW 320si	Y	1:24.196	
16	4	(Spain) Jordi Gené	SEAT Sport	SEAT León 2.0 TDI		1:24.284	
17	2	(Italy) Gabriele Tarquini	SEAT Sport	SEAT León 2.0 TDI		1:24.506	
18	33	(France) Laurent Cazenave	Wiechers-Sport	BMW 320si	Y	1:24.621	
19	29	(France) Éric Cayrolle	SUNRED Engineering	SEAT León 2.0 TFSI	Y	1:24.742	
20	5	(Portugal) Tiago Monteiro	SEAT Sport	SEAT León 2.0 TDI		1:24.874	
21^{3}	1	(France) Yvan Muller	SEAT Sport	SEAT León 2.0 TDI		1:24.894	
22	18	(Netherlands) Jaap van Lagen	LADA Sport	LADA 110 2.0		1:24.925	
23	26	(Denmark) Kristian Poulsen	Liqui Moly Team Engstler	BMW 320si	Y	1:25.280	
24	22	(United Kingdom) Tom Boardman	SUNRED Engineering	SEAT León 2.0 TFSI	Y	1:25.299	
25	19	(Russia) Kirill Ladygin	LADA Sport	LADA 110 2.0		1:25.457	
26	20	(Russia) Viktor Shapovalov	LADA Sport	LADA 110 2.0		1:26.054	

^1 — Robert Huff, Andy Priaulx, Tom Coronel, Nicola Larini, Alain Menu, Félix Porteiro and Sergio Hernández had all their times in Q2 deleted for exceeding the engine rev limit on their cars.

^2 — Stefano D'Aste had his four fastest lap times in Q1 deleted for exceeding the engine rev limit on his car.

^3 — Yvan Muller had his fastest lap time in Q1 deleted for exceeding the engine rev limit and the maximum supercharged air pressure on his car.

=== Race 1 ===
Pos.	No.	Name	Team	Car	C	Laps	Time/Retired	Grid	Points
1	11	(United Kingdom) Robert Huff	Chevrolet	Chevrolet Cruze LT		19	27:10.540	4	10
2	8	(Brazil) Augusto Farfus	BMW Team Germany	BMW 320si		19	+0.261	1	8
3	7	(Germany) Jörg Müller	BMW Team Germany	BMW 320si		19	+0.892	2	6
4	6	(United Kingdom) Andy Priaulx	BMW Team UK	BMW 320si		19	+1.105	5	5
5	10	(Spain) **Sergio Hernández**	BMW Team Italy-Spain	BMW 320si		19	+1.943	10	4
6	25	(Germany) Franz Engstler	Liqui Moly Team Engstler	BMW 320si	Y	19	+9.544	3	3
7	12	(Switzerland) Alain Menu	Chevrolet	Chevrolet Cruze LT		19	+9.550	8	2
8	21	(Netherlands) Tom Coronel	SUNRED Engineering	SEAT León 2.0 TFSI	Y	19	+11.050	6	1
9	22	(United Kingdom) Tom Boardman	SUNRED Engineering	SEAT León 2.0 TFSI	Y	19	+23.983	22	
10	29	(France) Éric Cayrolle	SUNRED Engineering	SEAT León 2.0 TFSI	Y	19	+31.504	17	
11	1	(France) Yvan Muller	SEAT Sport	SEAT León 2.0 TDI		19	+32.037	19	
12	2	(Italy) Gabriele Tarquini	SEAT Sport	SEAT León 2.0 TDI		19	+32.485	15	
13	3	(Sweden) Rickard Rydell	SEAT Sport	SEAT León 2.0 TDI		19	+33.322	14	
14	5	(Portugal) Tiago Monteiro	SEAT Sport	SEAT León 2.0 TDI		19	+34.067	18	
15	26	(Denmark) Kristian Poulsen	Liqui Moly Team Engstler	BMW 320si	Y	19	+34.823	21	
16	4	(Spain) Jordi Gené	SEAT Sport	SEAT León 2.0 TDI		19	+36.815	25	
17	20	(Russia) Viktor Shapovalov	LADA Sport	LADA 110 2.0		19	+54.020	26	
18	30	(Morocco) Mehdi Bennani	Exagon Engineering	SEAT León 2.0 TFSI	Y	19	+54.870	13	
19	28	(Croatia) Marin Čolak	Čolak Racing Team Ingra	SEAT León 2.0 TFSI	Y	18	+1 Lap	12	
Ret	18	(Netherlands) Jaap van Lagen	LADA Sport	LADA 110 2.0		13	Power steering	20	
Ret	27	(Italy) Stefano D'Aste	Wiechers-Sport	BMW 320si	Y	12	Race incident	24	
NC	9	(Italy) Alessandro Zanardi	BMW Team Italy-Spain	BMW 320si		12	+7 Laps	11	
Ret	33	(France) Laurent Cazenave	Wiechers-Sport	BMW 320si	Y	4	Clutch	16	
NC	14	(Italy) Nicola Larini	Chevrolet	Chevrolet Cruze LT		2	+17 Laps	7	
Ret	19	(Russia) Kirill Ladygin	LADA Sport	LADA 110 2.0		0	Race incident	23	
DSQ	23	(Spain) Félix Porteiro	Scuderia Proteam Motorsport	BMW 320si	Y	19	Disqualified	9	

- **Bold** denotes Fastest lap.

=== Race 2 ===
Pos.	No.	Name	Team	Car	C	Laps	Time/Retired	Grid	Points
1	12	(Switzerland) Alain Menu	Chevrolet	Chevrolet Cruze LT		18	52:22.260	1	10
2	8	(Brazil) Augusto Farfus	BMW Team Germany	BMW 320si		18	+0.351	7	8
3	11	(United Kingdom) Robert Huff	Chevrolet	Chevrolet Cruze LT		18	+3.066	8	6
4	6	(United Kingdom) Andy Priaulx	BMW Team UK	BMW 320si		18	+3.325	5	5
5	9	(Italy) Alessandro Zanardi	BMW Team Italy-Spain	BMW 320si		18	+16.153	20	4
6	2	(Italy) Gabriele Tarquini	SEAT Sport	SEAT León 2.0 TDI		18	+17.728	12	3
7	1	(France) Yvan Muller	SEAT Sport	SEAT León 2.0 TDI		18	+19.686	11	2
8	29	(France) Éric Cayrolle	SUNRED Engineering	SEAT León 2.0 TFSI	Y	18	+22.425	10	1
9	14	(Italy) Nicola Larini	Chevrolet	Chevrolet Cruze LT		18	+22.581	21	
10	26	(Denmark) Kristian Poulsen	Liqui Moly Team Engstler	BMW 320si	Y	18	+23.297	15	
11	5	(Portugal) Tiago Monteiro	SEAT Sport	SEAT León 2.0 TDI		18	+28.247	14	
12	4	(Spain) Jordi Gené	SEAT Sport	SEAT León 2.0 TDI		18	+29.778	16	
13	18	(Netherlands) Jaap van Lagen	LADA Sport	LADA 110 2.0		18	+34.095	24	
14	33	(France) Laurent Cazenave	Wiechers-Sport	BMW 320si	Y	18	+38.990	23	
15	20	(Russia) Viktor Shapovalov	LADA Sport	LADA 110 2.0		18	+44.402	17	
16	28	(Croatia) Marin Čolak	Čolak Racing Team Ingra	SEAT León 2.0 TFSI	Y	18	+52.439	19	
17	23	(Spain) Félix Porteiro	Scuderia Proteam Motorsport	BMW 320si	Y	17	+1 Lap	3	
18	7	(Germany) **Jörg Müller**	BMW Team Germany	BMW 320si		17	+1 Lap	6	
19	21	(Netherlands) Tom Coronel	SUNRED Engineering	SEAT León 2.0 TFSI	Y	15	+3 Laps	26	
Ret	30	(Morocco) Mehdi Bennani	Exagon Engineering	SEAT León 2.0 TFSI	Y	11	Race incident	18	
Ret	3	(Sweden) Rickard Rydell	SEAT Sport	SEAT León 2.0 TDI		10	Race incident	13	
Ret	19	(Russia) Kirill Ladygin	LADA Sport	LADA 110 2.0		9	Driveshaft	25	
Ret	25	(Germany) Franz Engstler	Liqui Moly Team Engstler	BMW 320si	Y	1	Race incident	2	
Ret	22	(United Kingdom) Tom Boardman	SUNRED Engineering	SEAT León 2.0 TFSI	Y	1	Race incident	9	
Ret	10	(Spain) Sergio Hernández	BMW Team Italy-Spain	BMW 320si		0	Race incident	4	
DNS	27	(Italy) Stefano D'Aste	Wiechers-Sport	BMW 320si	Y	0	Did not start	22	

- **Bold** denotes Fastest lap.

== Standings after the event ==
Drivers' Championship standings

	Pos	Driver	Points
	1	(France) Yvan Muller	45
3	2	(Brazil) Augusto Farfus	39
1	3	(Italy) Gabriele Tarquini	34
2	4	(United Kingdom) Robert Huff	32
2	5	(Sweden) Rickard Rydell	30

Yokohama Independents' Trophy standings

	Pos	Driver	Points
1	1	(Germany) Franz Engstler	71
1	2	(Spain) Félix Porteiro	68
	3	(Netherlands) Tom Coronel	56
	4	(Italy) Stefano D'Aste	25
1	5	(United Kingdom) Tom Boardman	23

Manufacturers' Championship standings

Pos	Manufacturer	Points
1	(Spain) SEAT	107
2	(Germany) BMW	91
3	(United States) Chevrolet	82
4	(Russia) Lada	29

- Note: Only the top five positions are included for both sets of drivers' standings.
