= 2009 FIA WTCC Race of Morocco =

Race details
- Round 3 of 12 in the 2009 World Touring Car Championship at Marrakech Street Circuit in Marrakesh, Morocco.
- Date: 3 May, 2009
- Location: Marrakesh, Morocco
- Course: Marrakech Street Circuit; 4.540 kilometres (2.821 mi)

Race One
- Laps: 12
Pole position
Driver		(United Kingdom) Robert Huff	Chevrolet
Time		1:49.789	
Podium
First		(United Kingdom) Robert Huff	Chevrolet
Second		(Italy) Gabriele Tarquini	SEAT Sport
Third		(Spain) Jordi Gené	SEAT Sport
Fastest Lap
Driver		(United Kingdom) Robert Huff	Chevrolet
Time		1:50.833	

Race Two
- Laps: 13
Podium
First		(Italy) Nicola Larini	Chevrolet
Second		(France) Yvan Muller	SEAT Sport
Third		(United Kingdom) Robert Huff	Chevrolet
Fastest Lap
Driver		(Switzerland) Alain Menu	Chevrolet
Time		1:51.017	

The 2009 FIA WTCC Race of Morocco (formally the 2009 FIA WTCC HSBC Race of Morocco) was the third round of the 2009 World Touring Car Championship season. It was held on 3 May 2009 at the Marrakech Street Circuit in Marrakesh, Morocco. It was the inaugural running of the FIA WTCC Race of Morocco.

The two races were won by Chevrolet's Robert Huff and Nicola Larini, the former taking the first win for the Chevrolet Cruze in the World Touring Car Championship.

== Background ==
After the previous round in Mexico, Yvan Muller was tied at the top of the drivers' standings with SEAT Sport teammate Rickard Rydell. Félix Porteiro had established a 23 point lead over Tom Coronel in the Yokohama Independents' Trophy.

This was the first FIA World Championship race to be held in Morocco since the 1958 Moroccan Grand Prix. The WTCC saw its first North African driver participate in an event when Mehdi Bennani joined the grid in an Exagon Engineering run SEAT León 2.0 TFSI.

Other changes were made to Scuderia Proteam Motorsport expanded to three cars for Morocco to run a BMW 320si for Vito Postiglione, and Tom Boardman requested a new car which wouldn't have been ready for the Moroccan event so he elected to skip the round and focus on returning for the Race of France.

== Report ==
=== Testing and free practice ===
Yvan Muller topped the times as the WTCC cars took to the Marrakech Street Circuit for the first time in Friday's test session. He was closely followed by Chevrolet's Alain Menu and SEAT Sport team mate Rydell.

SEAT Sport stayed on top in free practice one on Saturday morning, forming a SEAT 1–2–3–4–5 with Menu sixth. Coronel in seventh was the fastest independent driver and Jörg Müller in eighth was the fastest factory BMW car, Nicola Larini and Stefano D'Aste rounded out the top ten.

Yvan Muller topped the afternoon session with SEATs filling the top six places. Menu was sixth ahead of Huff and the fastest BMW was that of independent driver Franz Engstler.

=== Qualifying ===
Chevrolet's Huff beat practice pace setters SEAT in qualifying to claim pole position, the first for the new Cruze car. Gabriele Tarquini started second and Yvan Muller third. Despite setting the second fastest lap, Menu was demoted to 10th because the Stewards disallowed his Q2 qualifying times after his car did not restart following a mandatory visit to the weighing bay.

In Q1, SEAT had company at the top of the qualifying timesheet in the form of Chevrolet. While Tiago Monteiro initially made claim to pole with a 1:51.086, Menu (1:50.271), Larini (1:50.723) and Huff (1:50.817) stole the top spots. The end of the session saw Andy Priaulx miss his braking point at turn 1 and clash with Hernández who had come off his line to let Zanardi through. Due to the fact he received external aid to restart, Priaulx was not permitted to take part in Q2 and therefore qualified ninth following Menu's penalty. All of the LADA drivers remained out of Q2. Despite not making Q2, Moroccan driver Mehdi Bennani put in a strong performance to qualify 14th overall and second of the Independents.

In Q2, the session ended prematurely for Jörg Müller who suffered a rear left puncture after six minutes. He did not post a competitive qualifying time and lined up eighth for Race 1. The pack was tight and at one point during the session just four tenths of a second split the top six. On the last lap Huff charged to the front with a 1:49.789. Tarquini clocked a 1:50.086 on his last lap to secure a front-row place and Muller's best time was 1:50.156. Muller lined up third followed by Jordi Gené, Larini and Monteiro. Engstler qualified as best Independent and BMW driver in seventh, while Menu's qualifying session ended when he hit the wall at turn 2 on his last lap.

=== Warm-Up ===
Yvan Muller topped the warm–up session on Sunday morning with fellow SEAT drivers Gené second, Coronel third, Tarquini fourth and Monteiro fifth. Jörg Müller was the leading BMW while pole sitter Huff was eighth.

=== Race One ===
Robert Huff converted his pole into a win for Chevrolet, the first for the new Cruze car in its fifth race. Huff led the field from the start to finish with Gabriele Tarquini behind him the whole way to take second. Jordi Gené overtook Yvan Muller on the penultimate lap to secure third. Farfus' team-mate Jörg Müller was the fastest BMW and his eighth place finish meant pole in Race 2. Fellow BMW driver Alessandro Zanardi retired from the race on lap four.

The safety car was deployed at the end of the first lap after an incident involving Müller, Alain Menu and Rickard Rydell resulted in Rydell being squeezed into the wall at turn two and incurring race-ending damage to his car.

Moroccan driver Mehdi Bennani was best Independent in ninth overall, while Augusto Farfus was challenged hard by Tom Coronel for 12th position, but in the end, Coronel made a mistake at turn 11 on lap 10 and lost the battle.

=== Race Two ===
The second race saw Nicola Larini celebrate his first ever WTCC win. Yvan Muller took second place ahead of Race 1 winner Robert Huff. Jörg Müller led until lap eight when he went wide at turn 15 allowing Larini, Muller and Huff through. The BMW Team Germany driver eventually finished fourth ahead of Tarquini, Farfus and Monteiro. Franz Engstler took the final point in eighth as well as the Independent win. Andy Priaulx was in contention for points until lap 11 where he missed the braking point at turn 7 – he retired to the pits on the next lap.

Mehdi Bennani also went straight at the same point on lap 11 but continued to finish 10th and third independent. The safety car was deployed for two laps at the start after Hernández's car was stranded in an unsafe place.

== Results ==
=== Qualifying ===
Pos.	No.	Name	Team	Car	C	Q1	Q2
1	11	(United Kingdom) Robert Huff	Chevrolet	Chevrolet Cruze LT		1:50.817	1:49.789
2	2	(Italy) Gabriele Tarquini	SEAT Sport	SEAT León 2.0 TDI		1:51.033	1:50.086
3	1	(France) Yvan Muller	SEAT Sport	SEAT León 2.0 TDI		1:50.924	1:50.156
4	4	(Spain) Jordi Gené	SEAT Sport	SEAT León 2.0 TDI		1:51.294	1:50.266
5	14	(Italy) Nicola Larini	Chevrolet	Chevrolet Cruze LT		1:50.723	1:50.372
6	5	(Portugal) Tiago Monteiro	SEAT Sport	SEAT León 2.0 TDI		1:51.086	1:50.770
7	25	(Germany) Franz Engstler	Liqui Moly Team Engstler	BMW 320si	Y	1:51.750	1:51.643
8	7	(Germany) Jörg Müller	BMW Team Germany	BMW 320si		1:51.593	2:35.400
9	6	(United Kingdom) Andy Priaulx	BMW Team UK	BMW 320si		1:51.508	no time set
10	12	(Switzerland) Alain Menu	Chevrolet	Chevrolet Cruze LT		1:50.271	excluded
11	9	(Italy) Alessandro Zanardi	BMW Team Italy-Spain	BMW 320si		1:51.753	
12	3	(Sweden) Rickard Rydell	SEAT Sport	SEAT León 2.0 TDI		1:51.806	
13	8	(Brazil) Augusto Farfus	BMW Team Germany	BMW 320si		1:51.945	
14	30	(Morocco) Mehdi Bennani	Exagon Engineering	SEAT León 2.0 TFSI	Y	1:52.008	
15	23	(Spain) Félix Porteiro	Scuderia Proteam Motorsport	BMW 320si	Y	1:52.148	
16	21	(Netherlands) Tom Coronel	SUNRED Engineering	SEAT León 2.0 TFSI	Y	1:52.271	
17	26	(Denmark) Kristian Poulsen	Liqui Moly Team Engstler	BMW 320si	Y	1:52.401	
18	28	(Croatia) Marin Čolak	Čolak Racing Team Ingra	SEAT León 2.0 TFSI	Y	1:52.504	
19	10	(Spain) Sergio Hernández	BMW Team Italy-Spain	BMW 320si		1:52.622	
20	27	(Italy) Stefano D'Aste	Wiechers-Sport	BMW 320si	Y	1:52.733	
21	18	(Netherlands) Jaap van Lagen	LADA Sport	LADA 110 2.0		1:53.001	
22	19	(Russia) Kirill Ladygin	LADA Sport	LADA 110 2.0		1:53.510	
23	24	(Bulgaria) George Tanev	Scuderia Proteam Motorsport	BMW 320si	Y	1:53.636	
24	31	(Italy) Vito Postiglione	Scuderia Proteam Motorsport	BMW 320si	Y	1:53.711	
25	20	(Russia) Viktor Shapovalov	LADA Sport	LADA 110 2.0		1:54.046	

=== Race 1 ===
Pos.	No.	Name	Team	Car	C	Laps	Time/Retired	Grid	Points
1	11	(United Kingdom) **Robert Huff**	Chevrolet	Chevrolet Cruze LT		12	24:04.240	1	10
2	2	(Italy) Gabriele Tarquini	SEAT Sport	SEAT León 2.0 TDI		12	+1.729	2	8
3	4	(Spain) Jordi Gené	SEAT Sport	SEAT León 2.0 TDI		12	+5.583	4	6
4	1	(France) Yvan Muller	SEAT Sport	SEAT León 2.0 TDI		12	+7.044	3	5
5	5	(Portugal) Tiago Monteiro	SEAT Sport	SEAT León 2.0 TDI		12	+7.410	6	4
6	14	(Italy) Nicola Larini	Chevrolet	Chevrolet Cruze LT		12	+8.577	5	3
7	12	(Switzerland) Alain Menu	Chevrolet	Chevrolet Cruze LT		12	+9.043	10	2
8	7	(Germany) Jörg Müller	BMW Team Germany	BMW 320si		12	+9.839	8	1
9	30	(Morocco) Mehdi Bennani	Exagon Engineering	SEAT León 2.0 TFSI	Y	12	+10.398	14	
10	6	(United Kingdom) Andy Priaulx	BMW Team UK	BMW 320si		12	+11.011	9	
11	25	(Germany) Franz Engstler	Liqui Moly Team Engstler	BMW 320si	Y	12	+12.857	7	
12	8	(Brazil) Augusto Farfus	BMW Team Germany	BMW 320si		12	+17.033	13	
13	23	(Spain) Félix Porteiro	Scuderia Proteam Motorsport	BMW 320si	Y	12	+27.755	15	
14	10	(Spain) Sergio Hernández	BMW Team Italy-Spain	BMW 320si		12	+28.287	19	
15	28	(Croatia) Marin Čolak	Čolak Racing Team Ingra	SEAT León 2.0 TFSI	Y	12	+31.487	18	
16	27	(Italy) Stefano D'Aste	Wiechers-Sport	BMW 320si	Y	12	+34.793	20	
17	19	(Russia) Kirill Ladygin	LADA Sport	LADA 110 2.0		12	+34.929	22	
18	31	(Italy) Vito Postiglione	Scuderia Proteam Motorsport	BMW 320si	Y	12	+42.413	24	
19	24	(Bulgaria) George Tanev	Scuderia Proteam Motorsport	BMW 320si	Y	12	+43.944	23	
20	18	(Netherlands) Jaap van Lagen	LADA Sport	LADA 110 2.0		12	+55.021	21	
21	21	(Netherlands) Tom Coronel	SUNRED Engineering	SEAT León 2.0 TFSI	Y	12	+1:01.896	16	
22	20	(Russia) Viktor Shapovalov	LADA Sport	LADA 110 2.0		11	+1 Lap	25	
Ret	26	(Denmark) Kristian Poulsen	Liqui Moly Team Engstler	BMW 320si	Y	4	Race incident	17	
Ret	9	(Italy) Alessandro Zanardi	BMW Team Italy-Spain	BMW 320si		3	Radiator	11	
Ret	3	(Sweden) Rickard Rydell	SEAT Sport	SEAT León 2.0 TDI		0	Race incident	12	

- **Bold** denotes Fastest lap.

=== Race 2 ===
Pos.	No.	Name	Team	Car	C	Laps	Time/Retired	Grid	Points
1	14	(Italy) Nicola Larini	Chevrolet	Chevrolet Cruze LT		13	27:29.960	3	10
2	1	(France) Yvan Muller	SEAT Sport	SEAT León 2.0 TDI		13	+1.399	5	8
3	11	(United Kingdom) Robert Huff	Chevrolet	Chevrolet Cruze LT		13	+1.778	8	6
4	7	(Germany) Jörg Müller	BMW Team Germany	BMW 320si		13	+2.728	1	5
5	2	(Italy) Gabriele Tarquini	SEAT Sport	SEAT León 2.0 TDI		13	+3.068	7	4
6	8	(Brazil) Augusto Farfus	BMW Team Germany	BMW 320si		13	+3.991	12	3
7	25	(Germany) Franz Engstler	Liqui Moly Team Engstler	BMW 320si	Y	13	+6.779	11	2
8	21	(Netherlands) Tom Coronel	SUNRED Engineering	SEAT León 2.0 TFSI	Y	13	+11.084	21	1
9	30	(Morocco) Mehdi Bennani	Exagon Engineering	SEAT León 2.0 TFSI	Y	13	+15.644	9	
10	23	(Spain) Félix Porteiro	Scuderia Proteam Motorsport	BMW 320si	Y	13	+31.913	13	
11	19	(Russia) Kirill Ladygin	LADA Sport	LADA 110 2.0		13	+33.688	17	
12	28	(Croatia) Marin Čolak	Čolak Racing Team Ingra	SEAT León 2.0 TFSI	Y	13	+39.038	15	
13	27	(Italy) Stefano D'Aste	Wiechers-Sport	BMW 320si	Y	12	+1 Lap	16	
14	18	(Netherlands) Jaap van Lagen	LADA Sport	LADA 110 2.0		12	+1 Lap	20	
15	6	(United Kingdom) Andy Priaulx	BMW Team UK	BMW 320si		11	+2 Laps	10	
16	12	(Switzerland) **Alain Menu**	Chevrolet	Chevrolet Cruze LT		10	+3 Laps	2	
17	20	(Russia) Viktor Shapovalov	LADA Sport	LADA 110 2.0		9	+4 Laps	22	
Ret	31	(Italy) Vito Postiglione	Scuderia Proteam Motorsport	BMW 320si	Y	5	Race incident	18	
Ret	26	(Denmark) Kristian Poulsen	Liqui Moly Team Engstler	BMW 320si	Y	0	Race incident	24	
Ret	24	(Bulgaria) George Tanev	Scuderia Proteam Motorsport	BMW 320si	Y	0	Race incident	19	
Ret	10	(Spain) Sergio Hernández	BMW Team Italy-Spain	BMW 320si		0	Race incident	14	
Ret	4	(Spain) Jordi Gené	SEAT Sport	SEAT León 2.0 TDI		0	Electrical	6	
DNS	9	(Italy) Alessandro Zanardi	BMW Team Italy-Spain	BMW 320si		0	Did not start	25	
DNS	3	(Sweden) Rickard Rydell	SEAT Sport	SEAT León 2.0 TDI		0	Did not start	23	
DSQ	5	(Portugal) Tiago Monteiro	SEAT Sport	SEAT León 2.0 TDI		13	Disqualified	4	

- **Bold** denotes Fastest lap.

== Standings after the event ==
Drivers' Championship standings

	Pos	Driver	Points
	1	(France) Yvan Muller	43
2	2	(Italy) Gabriele Tarquini	31
1	3	(Sweden) Rickard Rydell	30
1	4	(Spain) Jordi Gené	24
2	5	(Brazil) Augusto Farfus	23

Yokohama Independents' Trophy standings

	Pos	Driver	Points
	1	(Spain) Félix Porteiro	64
1	2	(Germany) Franz Engstler	51
1	3	(Netherlands) Tom Coronel	42
	4	(Italy) Stefano D'Aste	25
	5	(Morocco) Mehdi Bennani	17

Manufacturers' Championship standings

Pos	Manufacturer	Points
1	(Spain) SEAT	93
2	(Germany) BMW	64
3	(United States) Chevrolet	51
4	(Russia) Lada	24

- Note: Only the top five positions are included for both sets of drivers' standings.
