= 2009 FIA WTCC Race of Mexico =

Race details
- Round 2 of 12 in the 2009 World Touring Car Championship at Autódromo Miguel E. Abed in Puebla, Mexico.
- Date: 22 March, 2009
- Location: Puebla, Mexico
- Course: Autódromo Miguel E. Abed; 3.363 kilometres (2.090 mi)

Race One
- Laps: 16
Pole position
Driver		(Brazil) Augusto Farfus	BMW Team Germany
Time		1:37.981	
Podium
First		(Sweden) Rickard Rydell	SEAT Sport
Second		(Brazil) Augusto Farfus	BMW Team Germany
Third		(United Kingdom) Andy Priaulx	BMW Team UK
Fastest Lap
Driver		(United Kingdom) Andy Priaulx	BMW Team UK
Time		1:38.076	

Race Two
- Laps: 16
Podium
First		(France) Yvan Muller	SEAT Sport
Second		(United Kingdom) Andy Priaulx	BMW Team UK
Third		(Sweden) Rickard Rydell	SEAT Sport
Fastest Lap
Driver		(Germany) Jörg Müller	BMW Team Germany
Time		1:38.287	

The 2009 FIA WTCC Race of Mexico (formally the 2009 FIA WTCC HSBC Race of Mexico) was the second round of the 2009 World Touring Car Championship season. It was held on 22 March 2009 at the Autódromo Miguel E. Abed near Puebla, Mexico. It was the fourth running of the FIA WTCC Race of Mexico.

The two races were won by SEAT Sport's Rickard Rydell and Yvan Muller.

== Background ==
After the first round of the year in Brazil, defending champion Yvan Muller was tied on points with SEAT Sport teammate Gabriele Tarquini at the top of the drivers' championship. Scuderia Proteam Motorsport's Félix Porteiro was leading the Yokohama Independents' Trophy.

== Report ==
=== Testing and free practice ===
The test session on Friday saw joint championship leader Yvan Muller go fastest. BMW drivers Augusto Farfus and Andy Priaulx set the pace early on before SEAT drivers Rickard Rydell and Tarquini went quicker. With a minute before the end of the session, Muller set the fastest time. Porteiro was the fastest independent driver in sixth while none of the Chevrolet drivers got into the top ten with Nicola Larini the fastest of the trio in twelfth.

Rydell led the opening free practice session on Saturday morning, the first of a SEAT 1–2–3–4. Farfus was the fastest BMW in fifth and Larini was the fastest Chevrolet down in thirteenth. Robert Huff was unable to set a time due to an oil leak on his Chevrolet Cruze.

The second free practice session saw Rydell go quickest once again. The BMWs of Farfus and Jörg Müller were second and third ahead of the SEAT Sport pair of Yvan Muller and Tarquini. The final two factory SEATs were Tiago Monteiro and Jordi Gené were eighth and thirteenth respectively.

=== Qualifying ===
Augusto Farfus, Andy Priaulx and BMW pushed to the limit and interrupted SEAT’s domination that lasted since the test session in Curitiba. Farfus won pole position, posting the fastest time of the session with a lap of 1:37.981, the first driver to break the 1:38 wall so far. He beat Priaulx by only 0.045 seconds, while Gabriele Tarquini saved SEAT’s honour claiming third position with a one-tenth gap. BMW and SEAT cars equally shared the ten positions giving access to Q2. Although they sat in the pits until halfway through the session, all five SEAT Sport drivers managed to make the top-ten, with Gabriele Tarquini in second with a gap of 0.065 seconds after having clocked a provisional fastest lap at 1:38.047.

Félix Porteiro topped the Independents again and also managed to advance to Q2 setting the 10th fastest lap at 1:38.972. Chevrolet and LADA drivers remained all out of Q2; Nicola Larini missed the top-ten by 18 thousandths of a second, while Jaap van Lagen’s session ended prematurely because of an engine leak. In Q2, Yvan Muller was the first to post a quick lap at 1:37.924, but the reigning world champion was immediately ousted by Farfus with the time of 1:37.682. Jordi Gené, Félix Porteiro, Sergio Hernández and Andy Priaulx were the last to join the session. In the dying seconds Priaulx managed to jump into second with a lap of 1:37.727, a time which resisted to Tarquini’s last attempt that was worth third place (1:37.793). Porteiro completed a lap of 1:38.525 that gave him a brilliant eighth position on the grid for Race 1.

=== Warm-Up ===
Pole sitter Farfus topped the times in Sunday morning's warm–up session, ahead of Priaulx and Rydell.

=== Race One ===
Rickard Rydell forced his way through the BMW front row to claim SEAT’s third consecutive victory in three rounds. Augusto Farfus and Andy Priaulx put a lot of pressure on the Swedish driver and eventually settled in second and third respectively, the first podium results for BMW in the season so far. While SEAT and BMW men were fighting for the top positions, Nicola Larini managed to defend his eighth place, scoring the first point for the new Chevrolet Cruze. Félix Porteiro won the Independents’ class once again, recovering from the 14th position where he had fallen after being involved in a collision at the start.

=== Race Two ===
The second race was another SEAT vs BMW fight. The reigning world champion Yvan Muller claimed his second victory of the season as he managed to keep at bay the former world champion Andy Priaulx. Jordi Gené took the lead at the start, but then, in a breathtaking succession of overtaking manoeuvres, Jörg Müller, Tarquini, Yvan Muller, Priaulx, Rydell and Farfus overturned the order completely. Müller and Tarquini however, had to leave the company after they clashed on lap 6 and slipped down. All the three Chevrolet cars completed the race, with Larini’s in tenth position, and so did the LADA cars, with Jaap van Lagen’s in 17th. Porteiro claimed a fourth consecutive win in the Independents’ trophy.

== Results ==
=== Qualifying ===
Pos.	No.	Name	Team	Car	C	Q1	Q2
1	8	(Brazil) Augusto Farfus	BMW Team Germany	BMW 320si		1:37.981	1:37.682
2	6	(United Kingdom) Andy Priaulx	BMW Team UK	BMW 320si		1:38.230	1:37.727
3	2	(Italy) Gabriele Tarquini	SEAT Sport	SEAT León 2.0 TDI		1:38.047	1:37.793
4	3	(Sweden) Rickard Rydell	SEAT Sport	SEAT León 2.0 TDI		1:38.411	1:37.874
5	1	(France) Yvan Muller	SEAT Sport	SEAT León 2.0 TDI		1:38.386	1:37.924
6	5	(Portugal) Tiago Monteiro	SEAT Sport	SEAT León 2.0 TDI		1:38.698	1:38.213
7	7	(Germany) Jörg Müller	BMW Team Germany	BMW 320si		1:38.375	1:38.287
8	23	(Spain) Félix Porteiro	Scuderia Proteam Motorsport	BMW 320si	Y	1:38.872	1:38.525
9	4	(Spain) Jordi Gené	SEAT Sport	SEAT León 2.0 TDI		1:38.250	1:38.749
10	10	(Spain) Sergio Hernández	BMW Team Italy-Spain	BMW 320si		1:38.434	1:38.952
11	14	(Italy) Nicola Larini	Chevrolet	Chevrolet Cruze LT		1:38.890	
12	9	(Italy) Alessandro Zanardi	BMW Team Italy-Spain	BMW 320si		1:39.174	
13	11	(United Kingdom) Robert Huff	Chevrolet	Chevrolet Cruze LT		1:39.294	
14	12	(Switzerland) Alain Menu	Chevrolet	Chevrolet Cruze LT		1:39.400	
15	21	(Netherlands) Tom Coronel	SUNRED Engineering	SEAT León 2.0 TFSI	Y	1:39.551	
16	27	(Italy) Stefano D'Aste	Wiechers-Sport	BMW 320si	Y	1:39.745	
17	25	(Germany) Franz Engstler	Liqui Moly Team Engstler	BMW 320si	Y	1:40.296	
18	28	(Croatia) Marin Čolak	Čolak Racing Team Ingra	SEAT León 2.0 TFSI	Y	1:40.346	
19	22	(United Kingdom) Tom Boardman	SUNRED Engineering	SEAT León 2.0 TFSI	Y	1:40.436	
20	24	(Bulgaria) George Tanev	Scuderia Proteam Motorsport	BMW 320si	Y	1:40.795	
21	20	(Russia) Viktor Shapovalov	LADA Sport	LADA 110 2.0		1:41.249	
22	19	(Russia) Kirill Ladygin	LADA Sport	LADA 110 2.0		1:41.611	
23	18	(Netherlands) Jaap van Lagen	LADA Sport	LADA 110 2.0		1:42.089	
EX^{1}	26	(Denmark) Kristian Poulsen	Liqui Moly Team Engstler	BMW 320si	Y	Excluded	

^1 — Kristian Poulsen had his qualifying times deleted after failing to stop at the weighing point after the session.

=== Race 1 ===
Pos.	No.	Name	Team	Car	C	Laps	Time/Retired	Grid	Points
1	3	(Sweden) Rickard Rydell	SEAT Sport	SEAT León 2.0 TDI		16	26:40.728	4	10
2	8	(Brazil) Augusto Farfus	BMW Team Germany	BMW 320si		16	+1.508	1	8
3	6	(United Kingdom) **Andy Priaulx**	BMW Team UK	BMW 320si		16	+1.986	2	6
4	1	(France) Yvan Muller	SEAT Sport	SEAT León 2.0 TDI		16	+4.620	5	5
5	7	(Germany) Jörg Müller	BMW Team Germany	BMW 320si		16	+5.717	7	4
6	2	(Italy) Gabriele Tarquini	SEAT Sport	SEAT León 2.0 TDI		16	+9.473	3	3
7	4	(Spain) Jordi Gené	SEAT Sport	SEAT León 2.0 TDI		16	+19.399	9	2
8	14	(Italy) Nicola Larini	Chevrolet	Chevrolet Cruze LT		16	+22.794	11	1
9	10	(Spain) Sergio Hernández	BMW Team Italy-Spain	BMW 320si		16	+24.725	10	
10	23	(Spain) Félix Porteiro	Scuderia Proteam Motorsport	BMW 320si	Y	16	+25.990	8	
11	5	(Portugal) Tiago Monteiro	SEAT Sport	SEAT León 2.0 TDI		16	+28.400	6	
12	27	(Italy) Stefano D'Aste	Wiechers-Sport	BMW 320si	Y	16	+30.289	16	
13	9	(Italy) Alessandro Zanardi	BMW Team Italy-Spain	BMW 320si		16	+33.765	12	
14	25	(Germany) Franz Engstler	Liqui Moly Team Engstler	BMW 320si	Y	16	+33.952	17	
15	21	(Netherlands) Tom Coronel	SUNRED Engineering	SEAT León 2.0 TFSI	Y	16	+34.302	15	
16	22	(United Kingdom) Tom Boardman	SUNRED Engineering	SEAT León 2.0 TFSI	Y	16	+45.954	19	
17	18	(Netherlands) Jaap van Lagen	LADA Sport	LADA 110 2.0		16	+46.557	23	
18	19	(Russia) Kirill Ladygin	LADA Sport	LADA 110 2.0		16	+57.945	22	
19	20	(Russia) Viktor Shapovalov	LADA Sport	LADA 110 2.0		13	+3 Laps	21	
Ret	12	(Switzerland) Alain Menu	Chevrolet	Chevrolet Cruze LT		11	Suspension	14	
NC	11	(United Kingdom) Robert Huff	Chevrolet	Chevrolet Cruze LT		6	+10 Laps	13	
Ret	28	(Croatia) Marin Čolak	Čolak Racing Team Ingra	SEAT León 2.0 TFSI	Y	0	Race incident	18	
Ret	24	(Bulgaria) George Tanev	Scuderia Proteam Motorsport	BMW 320si	Y	0	Mechanical	20	
Ret	26	(Denmark) Kristian Poulsen	Liqui Moly Team Engstler	BMW 320si	Y	0	Race incident	24	

- **Bold** denotes Fastest lap.

=== Race 2 ===
Pos.	No.	Name	Team	Car	C	Laps	Time/Retired	Grid	Points
1	1	(France) Yvan Muller	SEAT Sport	SEAT León 2.0 TDI		16	26:41.014	5	10
2	6	(United Kingdom) Andy Priaulx	BMW Team UK	BMW 320si		16	+0.459	6	8
3	3	(Sweden) Rickard Rydell	SEAT Sport	SEAT León 2.0 TDI		16	+1.240	8	6
4	8	(Brazil) Augusto Farfus	BMW Team Germany	BMW 320si		16	+1.973	7	5
5	10	(Spain) Sergio Hernández	BMW Team Italy-Spain	BMW 320si		16	+5.819	9	4
6	9	(Italy) Alessandro Zanardi	BMW Team Italy-Spain	BMW 320si		16	+6.281	13	3
7	4	(Spain) Jordi Gené	SEAT Sport	SEAT León 2.0 TDI		16	+11.755	2	2
8	2	(Italy) Gabriele Tarquini	SEAT Sport	SEAT León 2.0 TDI		16	+12.189	3	1
9	23	(Spain) Félix Porteiro	Scuderia Proteam Motorsport	BMW 320si	Y	16	+15.513	10	
10	14	(Italy) Nicola Larini	Chevrolet	Chevrolet Cruze LT		16	+16.593	1	
11	25	(Germany) Franz Engstler	Liqui Moly Team Engstler	BMW 320si	Y	16	+21.037	14	
12	12	(Switzerland) Alain Menu	Chevrolet	Chevrolet Cruze LT		16	+22.795	21	
13	7	(Germany) **Jörg Müller**	BMW Team Germany	BMW 320si		16	+22.987	4	
14	11	(United Kingdom) Robert Huff	Chevrolet	Chevrolet Cruze LT		16	+23.644	20	
15	21	(Netherlands) Tom Coronel	SUNRED Engineering	SEAT León 2.0 TFSI	Y	16	+24.218	15	
16	27	(Italy) Stefano D'Aste	Wiechers-Sport	BMW 320si	Y	16	+25.331	12	
17	18	(Netherlands) Jaap van Lagen	LADA Sport	LADA 110 2.0		16	+39.330	17	
18	24	(Bulgaria) George Tanev	Scuderia Proteam Motorsport	BMW 320si	Y	16	+39.790	23	
19	20	(Russia) Viktor Shapovalov	LADA Sport	LADA 110 2.0		16	+44.302	19	
20	19	(Russia) Kirill Ladygin	LADA Sport	LADA 110 2.0		16	+48.976	18	
21	22	(United Kingdom) Tom Boardman	SUNRED Engineering	SEAT León 2.0 TFSI	Y	14	+2 Laps	16	
22	28	(Croatia) Marin Čolak	Čolak Racing Team Ingra	SEAT León 2.0 TFSI	Y	12	+4 Laps	22	
Ret	26	(Denmark) Kristian Poulsen	Liqui Moly Team Engstler	BMW 320si	Y	7	Race incident	24	
Ret	5	(Portugal) Tiago Monteiro	SEAT Sport	SEAT León 2.0 TDI		0	Race incident	11	

- **Bold** denotes Fastest lap.

== Standings after the event ==
Drivers' Championship standings

	Pos	Driver	Points
	1	(France) Yvan Muller	30
2	2	(Sweden) Rickard Rydell	30
2	3	(Brazil) Augusto Farfus	20
2	4	(Italy) Gabriele Tarquini	19
2	5	(Spain) Jordi Gené	18

Yokohama Independents' Trophy standings

	Pos	Driver	Points
	1	(Spain) Félix Porteiro	53
	2	(Netherlands) Tom Coronel	30
	3	(Germany) Franz Engstler	25
3	4	(Italy) Stefano D'Aste	18
1	5	(United Kingdom) Tom Boardman	17

Manufacturers' Championship standings

	Pos	Manufacturer	Points
	1	(Spain) SEAT	67
	2	(Germany) BMW	49
1	3	(United States) Chevrolet	10
1	4	(Russia) Lada	9

- Note: Only the top five positions are included for both sets of drivers' standings.
