= Jean-Marie Clairet =

French racing driver

- Nationality: French
- Born: 28 October 1966 (age 60) Neuilly-sur-Seine (France)

SEAT León Eurocup career
- Debut season: 2008
- Current team: Team Clairet Sport
- Car number: 1
- Best finish: 7th in 2008

Previous series
- 2007 2000-01: Peugeot 206 RCC Cup France; French Super Production Championship

Jean-Marie Clairet (born 28 October 1966 in Neuilly-sur-Seine) is a French auto racing driver.

== Career ==
Clairet spent the 1990s racing in various one-make Citroën championships, for the AX and Saxo in France and in Europe. In 2000 and 2001, he competed in the French Super Production Championship in a Peugeot 306. Between 2003 and 2007, he raced in one-make series for the Peugeot 206. In 2008, he began competing in the SEAT León Eurocup, finishing the championship in seventh. He continued in the Eurocup in 2009, winning a race at Brands Hatch. This won him a drive for SUNRED Engineering in the World Touring Car Championship at Oschersleben.
