= 2009 FIA WTCC Race of UK =

(United Kingdom) 2009 FIA WTCC Race of UK
Race details
- Round 8 of 12 in the 2009 World Touring Car Championship at Brands Hatch in Kent, England.
- Date: 19 July, 2009
- Location: Kent, England
- Course: Brands Hatch; 3.703 kilometres (2.301 mi)

Race One
- Laps: 16
Pole position
Driver		(Switzerland) Alain Menu	Chevrolet
Time		1:33.521	
Podium
First		(Switzerland) Alain Menu	Chevrolet
Second		(United Kingdom) Rob Huff	Chevrolet
Third		(United Kingdom) Andy Priaulx	BMW Team UK
Fastest Lap
Driver		(Switzerland) Alain Menu	Chevrolet
Time		1:34.362	

Race Two
- Laps: 16
Podium
First		(Brazil) Augusto Farfus	BMW Team Germany
Second		(Germany) Jörg Müller	BMW Team Germany
Third		(Italy) Gabriele Tarquini	SEAT Sport
Fastest Lap
Driver		(Germany) Jörg Müller	BMW Team Germany
Time		1:34.448	

The 2009 FIA WTCC Race of UK (formally the 2009 FIA WTCC Marriott Race of UK) was the eighth round of the 2009 World Touring Car Championship season and the fifth FIA WTCC Race of UK. It was held on 19 July 2009 at the Brands Hatch circuit in Kent, England. The first race was won by Alain Menu for Chevrolet and the second race was won by Augusto Farfus for BMW Team Germany. The round was overshadowed by the death of Henry Surtees in the second FIA Formula Two Championship support race.

== Background ==
Yvan Muller arrived at Brands Hatch with a 14 point lead over SEAT Sport teammate Gabriele Tarquini, with BMW's Augusto Farfus a further point behind.

The race saw four new drivers for the 2009 season. ADAC Procar Series champion Philip Geipel joined Liqui Moly Team Engstler in a third BMW 320si. Meanwhile, Swedish team Polestar Racing entered two Volvo C30s for Robert Dahlgren and WTCC newcomer Tommy Rustad, however both Volvos were ineligible to score championship points. Norbert Michelisz drove the SUNRED Engineering-run SEAT Leon Eurocup prize car, as he did at Okayama in 2008.

== Report ==
=== Free Practice ===
Augusto Farfus went quickest in the first free practice session on the Saturday morning. The Brazilian BMW Team Germany driver then went quickest in the second session later in the morning.

=== Qualifying ===
Farfus went quickest in the first qualifying session. Amongst those who failed to make it through into the second session were Yvan Muller and Jordi Gene. Chevrolet's Alain Menu and Rob Huff locked out the front row of the grid after the second session, with the BMWs of Andy Priaulx and Augusto Farfus. Guest independent SEAT driver Norbert Michelisz qualified tenth, the leading independent. Jorg Muller, Robert Dahlgren, Jordi Gene and Kristian Poulsen all received grid penalties ahead of the first race. Muller received a five-place penalty for driving in the fast lane of the pits before the pit lane had been opened at the beginning of the session. Dahlgren had all his times disallowed because his team worked on the car during the parc ferme conditions between Q1 and Q2. The Swede dropped from 13th to the back of the grid. Gene also had his times disallowed because the engine speed sensor of his car's data logging system was disconnected, and he also dropped to the back row of the grid. Poulsen received a 10-place grid drop after having the engine in his BMW changed, although he had only qualified 22nd anyway.

=== Warm Up ===
Andy Priaulx went fastest in the Sunday morning warm-up session. The major story though was James Thompson setting the eighth quickest time in the Lada Priora.

=== Race One ===
The first race started with a multi-car accident at the Druids hairpin as Yvan Muller and Augusto Farfus tangled. Felix Porteiro and Norbert Michelisz were also heavily involved with many others taking to the grass on the inside and outside of the corner in avoidance. The incident brought the safety car out. Huff lead Menu from the restart, although Menu re-passed Huff for the lead on lap five. The two Chevrolet drivers remained out in front until the end of the race, although Priaulx pushed Huff for second in the final laps, having passed Gabriele Tarquini for third.

The safety car made a second appearance later in the race as Sergio Hernández, Vito Postiglione and Tommy Rustad tangled at Surtees. Farfus made his way through the field after his first lap incident to claim eighth place and pole position for Race 2.

Stefano D'Aste won the Independents Trophy from Tom Coronel and Tom Boardman. Menu set the fastest lap.

=== Race Two ===
Race two was won by pole-sitter Augusto Farfus from BMW Team Germany teammate Jörg Müller. SEAT Sport drivers Gabriele Tarquini and Rickard Rydell finished third and fourth ahead of Andy Priaulx. Yvan Muller battled through from the back of the field to take seventh place in an otherwise uneventful race.

Tom Boardman took his first ever Independent's Trophy win in tenth overall. Jörg Müller set the fastest lap of the race.

== Results ==
=== Qualifying ===
Pos.	No.	Name	Team	Car	C	Q1	Q2
1	12	(Switzerland) Alain Menu	Chevrolet	Chevrolet Cruze LT		1:34.088	1:33.521
2	11	(United Kingdom) Robert Huff	Chevrolet	Chevrolet Cruze LT		1:34.184	1:33.618
3	6	(United Kingdom) Andy Priaulx	BMW Team UK	BMW 320si		1:34.216	1:33.670
4	8	(Brazil) Augusto Farfus	BMW Team Germany	BMW 320si		1:33.836	1:33.696
5	3	(Sweden) Rickard Rydell	SEAT Sport	SEAT León 2.0 TDI		1:34.093	1:33.871
6	2	(Italy) Gabriele Tarquini	SEAT Sport	SEAT León 2.0 TDI		1:34.294	1:33.963
7	14	(Italy) Nicola Larini	Chevrolet	Chevrolet Cruze LT		1:34.110	1:33.968
8	7	(Germany) Jörg Müller	BMW Team Germany	BMW 320si		1:34.187	1:34.195
9	5	(Portugal) Tiago Monteiro	SEAT Sport	SEAT León 2.0 TDI		1:34.182	1:34.204
10	37	(Hungary) Norbert Michelisz	SUNRED Engineering	SEAT León 2.0 TFSI	Y	1:34.213	1:34.857
11	1	(France) Yvan Muller	SEAT Sport	SEAT León 2.0 TDI		1:34.366	
12	23	(Spain) Félix Porteiro	Scuderia Proteam Motorsport	BMW 320si	Y	1:34.380	
13	21	(Netherlands) Tom Coronel	SUNRED Engineering	SEAT León 2.0 TFSI	Y	1:34.559	
14	10	(Spain) Sergio Hernández	BMW Team Italy-Spain	BMW 320si		1:34.680	
15	27	(Italy) Stefano D'Aste	Wiechers-Sport	BMW 320si	Y	1:34.921	
16	9	(Italy) Alessandro Zanardi	BMW Team Italy-Spain	BMW 320si		1:35.033	
17	18	(Netherlands) Jaap van Lagen	LADA Sport	LADA 110 2.0		1:35.118	
18	22	(United Kingdom) Tom Boardman	SUNRED Engineering	SEAT León 2.0 TFSI	Y	1:35.227	
19	40	(Norway) Tommy Rustad	Volvo Olsbergs Green Racing	Volvo C30		1:35.363	
20	26	(Denmark) Kristian Poulsen	Liqui Moly Team Engstler	BMW 320si	Y	1:35.517	
21	31	(Italy) Vito Postiglione	Scuderia Proteam Motorsport	BMW 320si	Y	1:35.710	
22	25	(Germany) Franz Engstler	Liqui Moly Team Engstler	BMW 320si	Y	1:35.831	
23	36	(United Kingdom) James Thompson	LADA Sport	Lada Priora		1:35.950	
24	38	(Germany) Philip Geipel	Liqui Moly Team Engstler	BMW 320si	Y	1:36.245	
25	19	(Russia) Kirill Ladygin	LADA Sport	LADA 110 2.0		1:37.102	

=== Race 1 ===
Pos.	No.	Name	Team	Car	C	Laps	Time/Retired	Grid	Points
1	12	(Switzerland) **Alain Menu**	Chevrolet	Chevrolet Cruze LT		16	28:25.945	1	10
2	11	(United Kingdom) Robert Huff	Chevrolet	Chevrolet Cruze LT		16	+1.051	2	8
3	6	(United Kingdom) Andy Priaulx	BMW Team UK	BMW 320si		16	+1.240	3	6
4	2	(Italy) Gabriele Tarquini	SEAT Sport	SEAT León 2.0 TDI		16	+2.024	6	5
5	3	(Sweden) Rickard Rydell	SEAT Sport	SEAT León 2.0 TDI		16	+2.420	5	4
6	7	(Germany) Jörg Müller	BMW Team Germany	BMW 320si		16	+5.815	13	3
7	5	(Portugal) Tiago Monteiro	SEAT Sport	SEAT León 2.0 TDI		16	+6.300	8	2
8	8	(Brazil) Augusto Farfus	BMW Team Germany	BMW 320si		16	+8.307	4	1
9	27	(Italy) Stefano D'Aste	Wiechers-Sport	BMW 320si	Y	16	+9.225	15	
10	21	(Netherlands) Tom Coronel	SUNRED Engineering	SEAT León 2.0 TFSI	Y	16	+10.884	12	
11	22	(United Kingdom) Tom Boardman	SUNRED Engineering	SEAT León 2.0 TFSI	Y	16	+11.737	18	
12	9	(Italy) Alessandro Zanardi	BMW Team Italy-Spain	BMW 320si		16	+12.415	16	
13	4	(Spain) Jordi Gené	SEAT Sport	SEAT León 2.0 TDI		16	+13.331	26	
14	23	(Spain) Félix Porteiro	Scuderia Proteam Motorsport	BMW 320si	Y	16	+13.675	11	
15	39	(Sweden) Robert Dahlgren	Volvo Olsbergs Green Racing	Volvo C30		16	+14.087	25	
16	10	(Spain) Sergio Hernández	BMW Team Italy-Spain	BMW 320si		16	+17.753	14	
17	38	(Germany) Philip Geipel	Liqui Moly Team Engstler	BMW 320si	Y	16	+22.188	23	
18	36	(United Kingdom) James Thompson	LADA Sport	Lada Priora		16	+25.447	22	
19	19	(Russia) Kirill Ladygin	LADA Sport	LADA 110 2.0		16	+37.466	24	
20	26	(Denmark) Kristian Poulsen	Liqui Moly Team Engstler	BMW 320si	Y	16	+41.831	27	
21	31	(Italy) Vito Postiglione	Scuderia Proteam Motorsport	BMW 320si	Y	16	+42.677	20	
22	14	(Italy) Nicola Larini	Chevrolet	Chevrolet Cruze LT		15	+1 Lap	7	
Ret	25	(Germany) Franz Engstler	Liqui Moly Team Engstler	BMW 320si	Y	11	Race incident	21	
Ret	40	(Norway) Tommy Rustad	Volvo Olsbergs Green Racing	Volvo C30		6	Race incident	19	
Ret	18	(Netherlands) Jaap van Lagen	LADA Sport	LADA 110 2.0		5	Engine	17	
Ret	37	(Hungary) Norbert Michelisz	SUNRED Engineering	SEAT León 2.0 TFSI	Y	0	Race incident	9	
Ret	1	(France) Yvan Muller	SEAT Sport	SEAT León 2.0 TDI		0	Race incident	10	

- **Bold** denotes Fastest lap.

=== Race 2 ===
Pos.	No.	Name	Team	Car	C	Laps	Time/Retired	Grid	Points
1	8	(Brazil) Augusto Farfus	BMW Team Germany	BMW 320si		16	28:09.979	1	10
2	7	(Germany) **Jörg Müller**	BMW Team Germany	BMW 320si		16	+2.061	3	8
3	2	(Italy) Gabriele Tarquini	SEAT Sport	SEAT León 2.0 TDI		16	+7.030	5	6
4	3	(Sweden) Rickard Rydell	SEAT Sport	SEAT León 2.0 TDI		16	+7.398	4	5
5	6	(United Kingdom) Andy Priaulx	BMW Team UK	BMW 320si		16	+7.749	6	4
6	11	(United Kingdom) Robert Huff	Chevrolet	Chevrolet Cruze LT		16	+8.427	7	3
7	1	(France) Yvan Muller	SEAT Sport	SEAT León 2.0 TDI		16	+16.651	24	2
8	5	(Portugal) Tiago Monteiro	SEAT Sport	SEAT León 2.0 TDI		16	+17.444	2	1
9	10	(Spain) Sergio Hernández	BMW Team Italy-Spain	BMW 320si		16	+18.191	16	
10	22	(United Kingdom) Tom Boardman	SUNRED Engineering	SEAT León 2.0 TFSI	Y	16	+19.523	11	
11	21	(Netherlands) Tom Coronel	SUNRED Engineering	SEAT León 2.0 TFSI	Y	16	+19.969	10	
12	9	(Italy) Alessandro Zanardi	BMW Team Italy-Spain	BMW 320si		16	+20.183	12	
13	27	(Italy) Stefano D'Aste	Wiechers-Sport	BMW 320si	Y	16	+21.589	9	
14	39	(Sweden) Robert Dahlgren	Volvo Olsbergs Green Racing	Volvo C30		16	+22.255	25	
15	23	(Spain) Félix Porteiro	Scuderia Proteam Motorsport	BMW 320si	Y	16	+22.923	14	
16	4	(Spain) Jordi Gené	SEAT Sport	SEAT León 2.0 TDI		16	+23.053	13	
17	14	(Italy) Nicola Larini	Chevrolet	Chevrolet Cruze LT		16	+23.594	22	
18	12	(Switzerland) Alain Menu	Chevrolet	Chevrolet Cruze LT		16	+24.021	8	
19	25	(Germany) Franz Engstler	Liqui Moly Team Engstler	BMW 320si	Y	16	+28.723	26	
20	38	(Germany) Philip Geipel	Liqui Moly Team Engstler	BMW 320si	Y	16	+29.318	17	
21	18	(Netherlands) Jaap van Lagen	LADA Sport	LADA 110 2.0		16	+35.320	27	
22	36	(United Kingdom) James Thompson	LADA Sport	Lada Priora		16	+36.187	18	
23	31	(Italy) Vito Postiglione	Scuderia Proteam Motorsport	BMW 320si	Y	16	+36.735	21	
24	19	(Russia) Kirill Ladygin	LADA Sport	LADA 110 2.0		12	+4 Laps	19	
NC	37	(Hungary) Norbert Michelisz	SUNRED Engineering	SEAT León 2.0 TFSI	Y	6	+10 Laps	23	
Ret	40	(Norway) Tommy Rustad	Volvo Olsbergs Green Racing	Volvo C30		4	Race incident	25	
Ret	26	(Denmark) Kristian Poulsen	Liqui Moly Team Engstler	BMW 320si	Y	3	Race incident	20	

- **Bold** denotes Fastest lap.

== Standings after the race ==
Drivers' Championship standings

Pos	Driver	Points
1	(France) Yvan Muller	82
2	(Italy) Gabriele Tarquini	77
3	(Brazil) Augusto Farfus	76
4	(Sweden) Rickard Rydell	55
5	(United Kingdom) Robert Huff	54

Yokohama Independents' Trophy standings

Pos	Driver	Points
1	(Spain) Félix Porteiro	145
2	(Netherlands) Tom Coronel	129
3	(Germany) Franz Engstler	104
4	(Italy) Stefano D'Aste	89
5	(United Kingdom) Tom Boardman	54

Manufacturers' Championship standings

Pos	Manufacturer	Points
1	(Spain) SEAT	211
2	(Germany) BMW	201
3	(United States) Chevrolet	147
4	(Russia) Lada	59

- Note: Only the top five positions are included for both sets of drivers' standings.
