= 2009 FIA WTCC Race of Brazil =

Race details
- Round 1 of 12 in the 2009 World Touring Car Championship at Autódromo Internacional de Curitiba in Curitiba, Brazil.
- Date: 8 March, 2009
- Location: Curitiba, Brazil
- Course: Autódromo Internacional de Curitiba; 3.695 kilometres (2.296 mi)

Race One
- Laps: 16
Pole position
Driver		(France) Yvan Muller	SEAT Sport
Time		1:24.196	
Podium
First		(France) Yvan Muller	SEAT Sport
Second		(Spain) Jordi Gené	SEAT Sport
Third		(Sweden) Rickard Rydell	SEAT Sport
Fastest Lap
Driver		(France) Yvan Muller	SEAT Sport
Time		1:25.662	

Race Two
- Laps: 16
Podium
First		(Italy) Gabriele Tarquini	SEAT Sport
Second		(Sweden) Rickard Rydell	SEAT Sport
Third		(Spain) Jordi Gené	SEAT Sport
Fastest Lap
Driver		(Switzerland) Alain Menu	Chevrolet
Time		1:34.837	

The 2009 FIA WTCC Race of Brazil (formally the 2009 FIA WTCC HSBC Race of Brazil) was the first round of the 2009 World Touring Car Championship season. It was held on March 8, 2009 at the Autódromo Internacional de Curitiba near Curitiba, Brazil. It was the fourth running of the FIA WTCC Race of Brazil.

The two races were won by SEAT's Yvan Muller and Gabriele Tarquini, with SEAT filling both podiums.

== Background ==
The race marked the arrival of a fourth manufacturer, with Lada giving full backing to the Russian Bears Motorsport team, forming the Lada Sport team. SEAT, BMW and Chevrolet returned for their fifth seasons in the series, with Chevrolet introducing the new Cruze model.

Reigning Independents Trophy champion Sergio Hernández had joined BMW Team Italy-Spain from Scuderia Proteam Motorsport, swapping seats with fellow Spaniard Félix Porteiro. After a one-off appearance for the team in 2008, Tom Boardman joined SUNRED Engineering full-time, while Marin Čolak joined the series, forming his own team. Stefano D'Aste had returned to Wiechers-Sport, while Kristian Poulsen had joined Liqui Moly Team Engstler.

== Report ==
=== Testing and free practice ===
SEAT Sport driver Tarquini was fastest in the Friday test session. His fastest time was less than a tenth of a second faster than the BMW pair of Augusto Farfus and Jörg Müller. Behind them were five SEATs led by Yvan Muller, while the new Chevrolet Cruze was ninth in the hands of Nicola Larini. Scuderia Proteam Motorsport driver Porteiro was the fastest driver in the Yokohama Independents' Trophy. Jaap van Lagen was the fastest Lada driver. SUNRED driver Tom Coronel stopped early on in the session when his engine failed while Engstler Motorsport driver Poulsen didn't get any running due to a fuel pump failure.

Defending champion Yvan Muller led a SEAT 1–2–3–4–5 in the Saturday morning practice session with Farfus sixth as the best BMW runner. Porteiro was once again the fastest independent driver while Larini was the fastest Chevrolet. BMW Team UK driver Andy Priaulx finished 17th having suffered from brake problems.

Jörg Müller was fastest in the second free practice session ahead of earlier pace setter Yvan Muller. Priaulx was third after his brake problems in the morning session, while Alain Menu put his Chevrolet in seventh. Coronel missed more practice time due to a clutch problem on his Sunred SEAT.

=== Qualifying ===
For the first time qualifying was split into two sessions. The first determined the top ten, who would go through to the second session. The first session was red-flagged after five minutes when Kristian Poulsen crashed heavily into the wall at the final turn. Yvan Muller was fastest in the session, ahead of Gabriele Tarquini. Amongst those that went out in Q1 were Sergio Hernández, Rob Huff and Alex Zanardi.

Muller also set the fastest time in Q2, winning pole position ahead of his teammates, Jordi Gené, Tarquini, Tiago Monteiro and Rickard Rydell.

=== Warm-Up ===
Jörg Müller was the fastest driver in Sunday mornings warm up session, leading a BMW 1–2–3 ahead of Farfus and Priaulx. Pole sitter Yvan Muller was fourth.

=== Race One ===
The first race was dominated by Muller, as he led from the beginning until the end. SEAT teammates Gené, Rydell and Tarquini finished in second, third and fourth respectively. Alain Menu retired following a collision on the opening lap, involving him and the BMWs of Jörg Müller and Andy Priaulx. Müller spent five laps in the pits before rejoining the race, while Priaulx went on to climb from 21st to ninth. The safety car was introduced on lap six, following a crash for Stefano D'Aste. Nicola Larini finished the race in fifth, scoring the first points for the new Chevrolet Cruze. Augusto Farfus finished sixth ahead of Hernández and Monteiro. Félix Porteiro won the Independents’ class, finishing tenth overall.

After the race, Larini and Monteiro were given 30-second penalties after overtaking during the safety car period, dropping them to 15th and 16th respectively. Jaap van Lagen and George Tanev were also given the same penalties. Andy Priaulx and Porteiro inherited seventh and eighth places respectively.

=== Race Two ===
SEAT encored in race two, once again placing four drivers in the top four positions. The race started behind the safety car on a track flooded by a violent thunderstorm, with Félix Porteiro who had inherited pole position after Tiago Monteiro’s penalty. In the early stages the BMW drivers - Félix Porteiro, Andy Priaulx, Sergio Hernández and Augusto Farfus – set the pace, but soon the SEAT tide became unstoppable. Gabriele Tarquini, Rickard Rydell, Jordi Gené and Yvan Muller jumped on top to stay, while Porteiro repeated his success in the Independents’ class.

== Results ==
=== Qualifying ===
Pos.	No.	Name	Team	Car	C	Q1	Q2
1	1	(France) Yvan Muller	SEAT Sport	SEAT León 2.0 TDI		1:24.345	1:24.196
2	4	(Spain) Jordi Gené	SEAT Sport	SEAT León 2.0 TDI		1:24.796	1:24.315
3	2	(Italy) Gabriele Tarquini	SEAT Sport	SEAT León 2.0 TDI		1:24.537	1:24.355
4	5	(Portugal) Tiago Monteiro	SEAT Sport	SEAT León 2.0 TDI		1:24.554	1:24.472
5	3	(Sweden) Rickard Rydell	SEAT Sport	SEAT León 2.0 TDI		1:24.845	1:24.486
6	7	(Germany) Jörg Müller	BMW Team Germany	BMW 320si		1:24.706	1:24.637
7	8	(Brazil) Augusto Farfus	BMW Team Germany	BMW 320si		1:24.772	1:24.749
8	12	(Switzerland) Alain Menu	Chevrolet	Chevrolet Cruze LT		1:24.534	1:24.831
9	14	(Italy) Nicola Larini	Chevrolet	Chevrolet Cruze LT		1:25.010	1:24.831
10	6	(United Kingdom) Andy Priaulx	BMW Team UK	BMW 320si		1:24.772	1:24.933
11	10	(Spain) Sergio Hernández	BMW Team Italy-Spain	BMW 320si		1:25.046	
12	23	(Spain) Félix Porteiro	Scuderia Proteam Motorsport	BMW 320si	Y	1:25.377	
13	11	(United Kingdom) Robert Huff	Chevrolet	Chevrolet Cruze LT		1:25.456	
14	9	(Italy) Alessandro Zanardi	BMW Team Italy-Spain	BMW 320si		1:25.488	
15	25	(Germany) Franz Engstler	Liqui Moly Team Engstler	BMW 320si	Y	1:26.018	
16	22	(United Kingdom) Tom Boardman	SUNRED Engineering	SEAT León 2.0 TFSI	Y	1:26.026	
17	27	(Italy) Stefano D'Aste	Wiechers-Sport	BMW 320si	Y	1:26.076	
18	21	(Netherlands) Tom Coronel	SUNRED Engineering	SEAT León 2.0 TFSI	Y	1:26.220	
19	28	(Croatia) Marin Čolak	Čolak Racing Team Ingra	SEAT León 2.0 TFSI	Y	1:26.281	
20	18	(Netherlands) Jaap van Lagen	Lada Sport	LADA 110 2.0		1:26.753	
21	24	(Bulgaria) George Tanev	Scuderia Proteam Motorsport	BMW 320si	Y	1:26.940	
22	26	(Denmark) Kristian Poulsen	Liqui Moly Team Engstler	BMW 320si	Y	1:27.578	
23	19	(Russia) Kirill Ladygin	Lada Sport	LADA 110 2.0		1:27.585	
24	20	(Russia) Viktor Shapovalov	Lada Sport	LADA 110 2.0		1:28.035	

=== Race 1 ===
Pos.	No.	Name	Team	Car	C	Laps	Time/Retired	Grid	Points
1	1	(France) **Yvan Muller**	SEAT Sport	SEAT León 2.0 TDI		16	26:45.799	1	10
2	4	(Spain) Jordi Gené	SEAT Sport	SEAT León 2.0 TDI		16	+2.098	2	8
3	3	(Sweden) Rickard Rydell	SEAT Sport	SEAT León 2.0 TDI		16	+2.880	5	6
4	2	(Italy) Gabriele Tarquini	SEAT Sport	SEAT León 2.0 TDI		16	+3.501	3	5
5	8	(Brazil) Augusto Farfus	BMW Team Germany	BMW 320si		16	+7.766	7	4
6	10	(Spain) Sergio Hernández	BMW Team Italy-Spain	BMW 320si		16	+8.152	11	3
7	6	(United Kingdom) Andy Priaulx	BMW Team UK	BMW 320si		16	+12.128	10	2
8	23	(Spain) Félix Porteiro	Scuderia Proteam Motorsport	BMW 320si	Y	16	+13.441	12	1
9	21	(Netherlands) Tom Coronel	SUNRED Engineering	SEAT León 2.0 TFSI	Y	16	+15.971	18	
10	9	(Italy) Alessandro Zanardi	BMW Team Italy-Spain	BMW 320si		16	+16.105	14	
11	22	(United Kingdom) Tom Boardman	SUNRED Engineering	SEAT León 2.0 TFSI	Y	16	+16.990	16	
12	25	(Germany) Franz Engstler	Liqui Moly Team Engstler	BMW 320si	Y	16	+20.829	15	
13	20	(Russia) Viktor Shapovalov	Lada Sport	LADA 110 2.0		16	+26.339	24	
14	19	(Russia) Kirill Ladygin	Lada Sport	LADA 110 2.0		16	+27.540	23	
15	14	(Italy) Nicola Larini	Chevrolet	Chevrolet Cruze LT		16	+37.183	9	
16	5	(Portugal) Tiago Monteiro	SEAT Sport	SEAT León 2.0 TDI		16	+38.767	4	
17	18	(Netherlands) Jaap van Lagen	Lada Sport	LADA 110 2.0		16	+54.116	20	
18	24	(Bulgaria) George Tanev	Scuderia Proteam Motorsport	BMW 320si	Y	16	+54.868	21	
19	28	(Croatia) Marin Čolak	Čolak Racing Team Ingra	SEAT León 2.0 TFSI	Y	13	+3 Laps	19	
20	26	(Denmark) Kristian Poulsen	Liqui Moly Team Engstler	BMW 320si	Y	13	+3 Laps	22	
NC	7	(Germany) Jörg Müller	BMW Team Germany	BMW 320si		11	+5 Laps	6	
Ret	11	(United Kingdom) Robert Huff	Chevrolet	Chevrolet Cruze LT		5	Mechanical	13	
Ret	27	(Italy) Stefano D'Aste	Wiechers-Sport	BMW 320si	Y	4	Race incident	17	
Ret	12	(Switzerland) Alain Menu	Chevrolet	Chevrolet Cruze LT		2	Race incident	8	

- **Bold** denotes Fastest lap.

=== Race 2 ===
Pos.	No.	Name	Team	Car	C	Laps	Time/Retired	Grid	Points
1	2	(Italy) Gabriele Tarquini	SEAT Sport	SEAT León 2.0 TDI		16	27:44.649	5	10
2	3	(Sweden) Rickard Rydell	SEAT Sport	SEAT León 2.0 TDI		16	+0.810	6	8
3	4	(Spain) Jordi Gené	SEAT Sport	SEAT León 2.0 TDI		16	+5.869	7	6
4	1	(France) Yvan Muller	SEAT Sport	SEAT León 2.0 TDI		16	+7.157	8	5
5	7	(Germany) Jörg Müller	BMW Team Germany	BMW 320si		16	+9.916	20	4
6	8	(Brazil) Augusto Farfus	BMW Team Germany	BMW 320si		16	+11.759	4	3
7	23	(Spain) Félix Porteiro	Scuderia Proteam Motorsport	BMW 320si	Y	16	+13.721	1	2
8	21	(Netherlands) Tom Coronel	SUNRED Engineering	SEAT León 2.0 TFSI	Y	16	+14.216	9	1
9	6	(United Kingdom) Andy Priaulx	BMW Team UK	BMW 320si		16	+17.682	2	
10	10	(Spain) Sergio Hernández	BMW Team Italy-Spain	BMW 320si		16	+18.144	3	
11	12	(Switzerland) **Alain Menu**	Chevrolet	Chevrolet Cruze LT		16	+19.046	22	
12	5	(Portugal) Tiago Monteiro	SEAT Sport	SEAT León 2.0 TDI		16	+23.097	16	
13	11	(United Kingdom) Robert Huff	Chevrolet	Chevrolet Cruze LT		16	+23.376	21	
14	9	(Italy) Alessandro Zanardi	BMW Team Italy-Spain	BMW 320si		16	+27.315	10	
15	14	(Italy) Nicola Larini	Chevrolet	Chevrolet Cruze LT		16	+27.694	15	
16	25	(Germany) Franz Engstler	Liqui Moly Team Engstler	BMW 320si	Y	16	+29.859	12	
17	18	(Netherlands) Jaap van Lagen	Lada Sport	LADA 110 2.0		16	+34.424	17	
18	26	(Denmark) Kristian Poulsen	Liqui Moly Team Engstler	BMW 320si	Y	16	+35.860	19	
19	22	(United Kingdom) Tom Boardman	SUNRED Engineering	SEAT León 2.0 TFSI	Y	16	+36.601	11	
20	27	(Italy) Stefano D'Aste	Wiechers-Sport	BMW 320si	Y	16	+36.992	23	
21	24	(Bulgaria) George Tanev	Scuderia Proteam Motorsport	BMW 320si	Y	16	+48.908	18	
22	19	(Russia) Kirill Ladygin	Lada Sport	LADA 110 2.0		16	+49.709	14	
23	20	(Russia) Viktor Shapovalov	Lada Sport	LADA 110 2.0		16	+1:13.069	13	
DNS	28	(Croatia) Marin Čolak	Čolak Racing Team Ingra	SEAT León 2.0 TFSI	Y	0	Did not start	24	

- **Bold** denotes Fastest lap.

== Standings after the event ==
Drivers' Championship standings

Pos	Driver	Points
1	(France) Yvan Muller	15
2	(Italy) Gabriele Tarquini	15
3	(Spain) Jordi Gené	14
4	(Sweden) Rickard Rydell	14
5	(Brazil) Augusto Farfus	7

Yokohama Independents' Trophy standings

Pos	Driver	Points
1	(Spain) Félix Porteiro	31
2	(Netherlands) Tom Coronel	19
3	(Germany) Franz Engstler	11
4	(United Kingdom) Tom Boardman	10
5	(Denmark) Kristian Poulsen	7

Manufacturers' Championship standings

Pos	Manufacturer	Points
1	(Spain) SEAT	36
2	(Germany) BMW	22
3	(Russia) Lada	10
4	(United States) Chevrolet	9

- Note: Only the top five positions are included for both sets of drivers' standings.
