= Russian Bears Motorsport =

(Russia) Russian Bears Motorsport
- Founded: 2007
- Team principal(s): Viktor Shapovalov
- Current series: International GT Open
- Former series: FIA GT3 European Championship; Lada Granta Cup; European Production Series; World Touring Car Championship, Dutch Supercar Challenge

Russian Bears Motorsport, also known as SMP Racing, is a Russian auto racing team based in Moscow. They ran the works team for Lada in the World Touring Car Championship (WTCC), under the banner of Lada Sport in the 2009 season.

== Team history ==
Russian Bears Motorsport was formed in March 2007, and started by running BMW 320is in the Dutch Supercar Challenge, with drivers Viktor Shapovalov (who also owns the team), Lev Fridman, Evgeny Zelenov and Oleg Petrikov. Shapovalov, Fridman and Zelenov all made their WTCC debuts in the BMWs at Circuit Park Zandvoort, and Shapovalov and Fridman also competed in the following round at Circuit de Valencia.

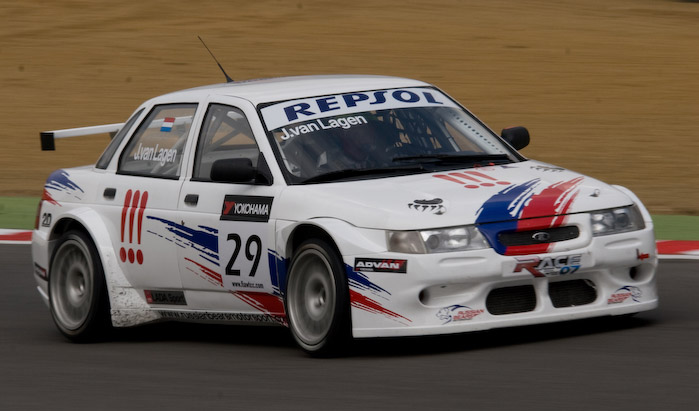
Van Lagen driving the Lada 110 WTCC car at Brands Hatch in 2008.

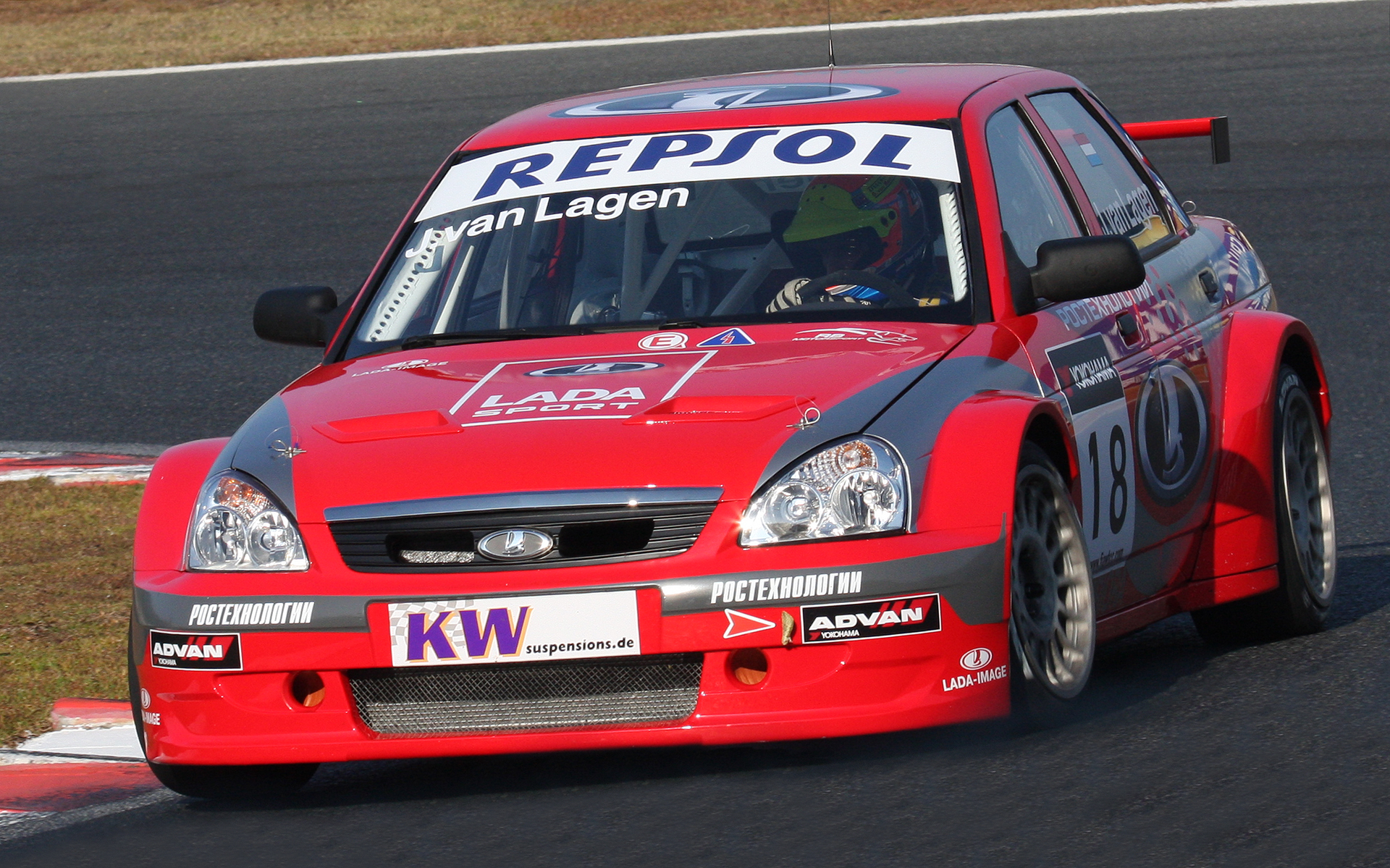
Van Lagen driving the Lada Priora

The team returned to the WTCC to run Lada 110s in 2008, with Dutch driver Jaap van Lagen joining Shapovalov with driving duties. Kirill Ladygin joined the team in a third car for the final four rounds.

For 2009, the team attracted support from Lada, with the Russian company thus becoming the fourth manufacturer in the championship alongside SEAT, BMW and Chevrolet. The introduction of the new Priora at Porto and the addition of former British Touring Car Champion James Thompson to the driver lineup helped the team to increase their competitiveness during the season. Drivers points were achieved by Thompson for a pair of 6th places at the Imola round, which were also the first for either a Russian Bears driver or a Lada driver in the series. In order to make room for Thompson, Shapovalov had stepped down from driving duties to concentrate on team management.

For 2011, the team participated in the new European Production Series (EP Series) with Kirill Ladygin and Vyacheslav Maleev driving two SEAT Leons and in the Lada Granta Cup driving two Lada Grantas Sport. Kirill was the 2011 Granta Cup Champion.

For 2012, Russian Bears Motorsport began a new FIA GT3 European Championship campaign. This time Kirill Ladygin and Vyacheslav Maleev drove a Ferrari 458 GT3 Italia.

In 2013, Russian Bears Motorsport renamed themselves to SMP Racing. The team entered the International GT Open.

For 2014 the team campaigned in the World Endurance Championship, running a Ferrari 458 GT3 Italia in the LMGTE-am class and a pair of Oreca 03Rs in the LMP2 class.
