= List of World Touring Car Championship drivers =

This is a complete list of drivers and teams who have competed in the World Touring Car Championship from the 2005 season to 2017 season.

== Drivers ==
Key

| Symbol | Meaning |
|---|---|
| † | Driver has won the World Drivers' Championship |

| Name | Country | Seasons | Championships | Trophies | Entries | Starts | Poles | Wins | Podiums | Fastest laps | Points |
|---|---|---|---|---|---|---|---|---|---|---|---|
| Nasser Al-Attiyah | Qatar | 2015 | 0 | 0 | 2 | 2 | 0 | 0 | 0 | 0 | 0 |
| Célio Alves Dias | Macau | 2012–2013 | 0 | 0 | 4 | 4 | 0 | 0 | 0 | 0 | 1 |
| Ao Chi Hong | Macau | 2005–2007 | 0 | 0 | 4 | 2 | 0 | 0 | 0 | 0 | 0 |
| Takayuki Aoki | Japan | 2008–2009 | 0 | 0 | 8 | 8 | 0 | 0 | 0 | 0 | 0 |
| Seiji Ara | Japan | 2009 | 0 | 0 | 2 | 2 | 0 | 0 | 0 | 0 | 0 |
| Toshi Arai | Japan | 2011 | 0 | 0 | 2 | 2 | 0 | 0 | 0 | 0 | 0 |
| Soheil Ayari | France | 2005 | 0 | / | 2 | 2 | 0 | 0 | 0 | 0 | 0 |
| Jerónimo Badaraco | Macau | 2013 | 0 | 0 | 6 | 6 | 0 | 0 | 0 | 0 | 0 |
| Alessandro Balzan | Italy | 2005–2006 | 0 | 0 | 10 | 9 | 0 | 0 | 0 | 0 | 5 |
| Andrea Barlesi | Belgium | 2012 | 0 | 0 | 6 | 6 | 0 | 0 | 0 | 0 | 0 |
| Fredy Barth | Switzerland | 2010–2013 | 0 | 0 | 70 | 63 | 0 | 0 | 0 | 0 | 81 |
| Marc Basseng | Germany | 2013 | 0 | 0 | 24 | 24 | 0 | 0 | 0 | 0 | 57 |
| Rainer Bastuck | Germany | 2006 | 0 | 0 | 2 | 2 | 0 | 0 | 0 | 0 | 0 |
| Anthony Beltoise | France | 2007 | 0 | 0 | 2 | 2 | 0 | 0 | 0 | 0 | 0 |
| Mehdi Bennani | Morocco | 2009–2017 | 0 | 1; 2016 | 193 | 191 | 10 | 6 | 19 | 3 | 826 |
| Patrick Bernhardt | Germany | 2005 | 0 | / | 2 | 2 | 0 | 0 | 0 | 0 | 0 |
| Aytaç Biter | Turkey | 2008 | 0 | 0 | 4 | 4 | 0 | 0 | 0 | 0 | 0 |
| Thed Björk† | Sweden | 2013, 2016–2017 | 1; 2017 | 0 | 44 | 43 | 1 | 3 | 9 | 4 | 400.5 |
| Tom Boardman | England | 2008–2010, 2012–2013 | 0 | 0 | 66 | 60 | 0 | 0 | 0 | 0 | 20 |
| Dušan Borković | Serbia | 2014-2015 | 0 | 0 | 25 | 23 | 0 | 0 | 1 | 0 | 41 |
| Carlos "Cacá" Bueno | Brazil | 2010–2011 | 0 | 0 | 4 | 3 | 0 | 0 | 1 | 0 | 25 |
| Konstantīns Calko | Latvia | 2013 | 0 | 0 | 2 | 2 | 0 | 0 | 0 | 0 | 0 |
| César Campaniço | Portugal | 2010 | 0 | 0 | 2 | 2 | 0 | 0 | 0 | 0 | 0 |
| Marc Carol | Spain | 2005, 2010 | 0 | 0 | 4 | 4 | 0 | 0 | 0 | 0 | 1 |
| Nick Catsburg | Netherlands | 2015–2017 | 0 | / | 58 | 57 | 2 | 2 | 10 | 5 | 454.5 |
| Éric Cayrolle | France | 2009 | 0 | 0 | 2 | 2 | 0 | 0 | 0 | 0 | 1 |
| Laurent Cazenave | France | 2008–2009 | 0 | 0 | 4 | 4 | 0 | 0 | 0 | 0 | 0 |
| Maurizio Ceresoli | Italy | 2006–2007 | 0 | 0 | 38 | 37 | 0 | 0 | 0 | 0 | 0 |
| Alberto Cerqui | Italy | 2012 | 0 | 0 | 22 | 22 | 0 | 0 | 0 | 0 | 45 |
| Chan Kin Man | Macau | 2010 | 0 | 0 | 2 | 0 | 0 | 0 | 0 | 0 | 0 |
| Kevin Chen | Taiwan | 2010 | 0 | 0 | 4 | 4 | 0 | 0 | 0 | 0 | 0 |
| Tom Chilton | England | 2012–2017 | 0 | 1; 2017 | 137 | 135 | 3 | 7 | 22 | 7 | 877.5 |
| Melvin Choo | Singapore | 2008 | 0 | 0 | 4 | 4 | 0 | 0 | 0 | 0 | 0 |
| Giuseppe Cirò | Italy | 2005 | 0 | 0 | 20 | 19 | 0 | 0 | 0 | 0 | 1 |
| Jean-Marie Clairet | France | 2009 | 0 | 0 | 2 | 2 | 0 | 0 | 0 | 0 | 0 |
| Marin Čolak | Croatia | 2008–2009 | 0 | 0 | 16 | 14 | 0 | 0 | 0 | 0 | 0 |
| Roberto Colciago | Italy | 2005–2007 | 0 | 0 | 32 | 28 | 0 | 0 | 0 | 0 | 10 |
| Tim Coronel | Netherlands | 2009–2010 | 0 | 0 | 4 | 4 | 0 | 0 | 0 | 0 | 0 |
| Tom Coronel | Netherlands | 2005–2017 | 0 | 2; 2006, 2009 | 293 | 286 | 12 | 6 | 26 | 2 | 1227 |
| Pierre-Yves Corthals | Belgium | 2006–2008, 2010 | 0 | 0 | 56 | 53 | 0 | 0 | 0 | 0 | 3 |
| Marcel Costa | Spain | 2006 | 0 | / | 8 | 8 | 0 | 0 | 0 | 0 | 0 |
| André Couto | Macau | 2005–2012 | 0 | 0 | 16 | 12 | 0 | 0 | 0 | 0 | 2 |
| Kei Cozzolino | Italy | 2012 | 0 | 0 | 2 | 2 | 0 | 0 | 0 | 0 | 0 |
| Stefano d'Aste | Italy | 2005–2013, 2015 | 0 | 1; 2007 | 206 | 200 | 0 | 2 | 5 | 1 | 222 |
| Lourenço da Veiga | Portugal | 2008 | 0 | 0 | 2 | 2 | 0 | 0 | 0 | 0 | 0 |
| Robert Dahlgren | Sweden | 2007–2011, 2016 | 0 | / | 40 | 37 | 0 | 0 | 0 | 1 | 78 |
| Jean-Philippe Dayraut | France | 2013 | 0 | 0 | 2 | 2 | 0 | 0 | 0 | 0 | 0 |
| Eurico de Jesus | Macau | 2012–2013 | 0 | 0 | 4 | 4 | 0 | 0 | 0 | 0 | 0 |
| Gianluca de Lorenzi | Italy | 2005 | 0 | 0 | 6 | 6 | 0 | 0 | 0 | 0 | 0 |
| Adriano de Micheli | Italy | 2005 | 0 | 0 | 16 | 15 | 0 | 0 | 0 | 0 | 0 |
| João Paulo de Oliveira | Brazil | 2009 | 0 | 0 | 2 | 2 | 0 | 0 | 0 | 0 | 0 |
| Filipe de Souza | Macau | 2011–2014, 2017 | 0 | 0 | 24 | 24 | 0 | 0 | 0 | 0 | 8.5 |
| María de Villota | Spain | 2006–2007 | 0 | 0 | 4 | 4 | 0 | 0 | 0 | 0 | 0 |
| Grégoire Demoustier | France | 2015–2016 | 0 | 0 | 46 | 46 | 0 | 0 | 0 | 0 | 16 |
| Pasquale di Sabatino | Italy | 2012, 2014 | 0 | 0 | 27 | 27 | 0 | 0 | 0 | 0 | 2 |
| Frank Diefenbacher | Germany | 2005 | 0 | 0 | 2 | 0 | 0 | 0 | 0 | 0 | 0 |
| Aleksei Dudukalo | Russia | 2011–2013 | 0 | 0 | 50 | 46 | 0 | 0 | 1 | 0 | 37 |
| Camilo Echevarría | Argentina | 2014 | 0 | 0 | 2 | 2 | 0 | 0 | 0 | 0 | 1 |
| Jens Edman | Sweden | 2006 | 0 | 0 | 4 | 3 | 0 | 0 | 0 | 0 | 0 |
| Fredrik Ekblom | Sweden | 2007, 2016 | 0 | / | 20 | 20 | 0 | 0 | 0 | 0 | 48 |
| Yann Ehrlacher | France | 2017 | 0 | 0 | 20 | 20 | 2 | 1 | 3 | 0 | 90 |
| Youssaf El Marnissi | Morocco | 2010 | 0 | 0 | 2 | 0 | 0 | 0 | 0 | 0 | 0 |
| Franz Engstler | Germany | 2007–2014 | 0 | 1; 2014 | 165 | 165 | 4 | 1 | 2 | 0 | 179 |
| Tomas Engström | Sweden | 2005, 2007 | 0 | 0 | 6 | 6 | 0 | 0 | 0 | 0 | 0 |
| Fabio Fabiani | Italy | 2009–2011 | 0 | 1; 2011 | 26 | 24 | 0 | 0 | 0 | 0 | 0 |
| Augusto Farfus | Brazil | 2005–2010 | 0 | / | 132 | 131 | 11 | 15 | 32 | 14 | 543 |
| Duarte Félix da Costa | Portugal | 2008 | 0 | 0 | 2 | 2 | 0 | 0 | 0 | 0 | 0 |
| Ferenc Ficza | Hungary | 2016 | 0 | 0 | 22 | 19 | 0 | 0 | 0 | 1 | 2 |
| John Filippi | France | 2014-2017 | 0 | 0 | 89 | 89 | 3 | 0 | 0 | 0 | 67 |
| Miguel Freitas | Portugal | 2007 | 0 | 0 | 14 | 14 | 0 | 0 | 0 | 0 | 0 |
| Lev Fridman | Russia | 2007 | 0 | 0 | 4 | 4 | 0 | 0 | 0 | 0 | 0 |
| Petr Fulín | Czech Republic | 2014 | 0 | 0 | 3 | 1 | 0 | 0 | 0 | 0 | 0 |
| Michael Funke | Germany | 2005 | 0 | / | 10 | 7 | 0 | 0 | 0 | 0 | 0 |
| Antonio García | Spain | 2005 | 0 | / | 20 | 19 | 0 | 0 | 3 | 0 | 51 |
| Philip Geipel | Germany | 2006–2007, 2009 | 0 | 0 | 8 | 8 | 0 | 0 | 0 | 0 | 0 |
| Jordi Gené | Spain | 2005–2010 | 0 | / | 126 | 126 | 2 | 4 | 15 | 5 | 289 |
| Fabrizio Giovanardi | Italy | 2005–2006 | 0 | / | 24 | 22 | 2 | 4 | 8 | 1 | 89 |
| Néstor Girolami | Argentina | 2015–2017 | 0 | 0 | 24 | 23 | 2 | 1 | 3 | 0 | 129 |
| Kevin Gleason | United States | 2017 | 0 | 0 | 18 | 18 | 2 | 0 | 1 | 0 | 47.5 |
| Florian Gruber | Germany | 2006 | 0 | / | 2 | 2 | 0 | 0 | 0 | 0 | 0 |
| Esteban Guerrieri | Argentina | 2016–2017 | 0 | 0 | 22 | 22 | 1 | 3 | 5 | 4 | 250 |
| Simon Harrison | England | 2005 | 0 | 0 | 2 | 1 | 0 | 0 | 0 | 0 | 0 |
| Éric Hélary | France | 2005 | 0 | / | 2 | 1 | 0 | 0 | 0 | 0 | 0 |
| Jens Hellström | Sweden | 2005 | 0 | 0 | 2 | 2 | 0 | 0 | 0 | 0 | 0 |
| Marc Hennerici | Germany | 2005 | 0 | 1; 2005 | 20 | 19 | 0 | 0 | 0 | 0 | 0 |
| Sergio Hernández | Spain | 2007–2010 | 0 | 2; 2008, 2010 | 88 | 86 | 0 | 1 | 2 | 2 | 55 |
| Oscar Hidalgo | Mexico | 2006 | 0 | 0 | 2 | 2 | 0 | 0 | 0 | 0 | 0 |
| Henry Ho | Macau | 2009–2010, 2012–2013 | 0 | 0 | 16 | 15 | 0 | 0 | 0 | 0 | 2 |
| Robb Holland | United States | 2012 | 0 | 0 | 2 | 2 | 0 | 0 | 0 | 0 | 0 |
| Maťo Homola | Slovakia | 2015 | 0 | 0 | 2 | 2 | 0 | 0 | 0 | 0 | 0 |
| Robert Huff† | England | 2005–2017 | 1; 2012 | / | 293 | 290 | 14 | 29 | 90 | 28 | 2191 |
| Duncan Huisman | Netherlands | 2005–2008 | 0 | 0 | 16 | 16 | 0 | 1 | 3 | 1 | 35 |
| Simone Iacone | Italy | 2006 | 0 | 0 | 4 | 3 | 0 | 0 | 0 | 0 | 0 |
| Yoshihiro Ito | Japan | 2010 | 0 | 0 | 2 | 2 | 0 | 0 | 0 | 0 | 0 |
| Takuya Izawa | Japan | 2013 | 0 | 0 | 2 | 2 | 0 | 0 | 0 | 0 | 0 |
| Thomas Jäger | Germany | 2005 | 0 | / | 8 | 8 | 0 | 0 | 0 | 0 | 0 |
| Jiří Janák | Czech Republic | 2006 | 0 | 0 | 2 | 2 | 0 | 0 | 0 | 0 | 0 |
| Michel Jourdain Jr. | Mexico | 2007 | 0 | / | 20 | 20 | 0 | 0 | 0 | 0 | 3 |
| Masaki Kano | Japan | 2008–2013 | 0 | 0 | 14 | 13 | 0 | 0 | 0 | 0 | 0 |
| Nikolay Karamyshev | Russia | 2013 | 0 | 0 | 4 | 4 | 0 | 0 | 0 | 0 | 0 |
| Kin Veng Ng | Macau | 2012–2013 | 0 | 0 | 8 | 8 | 0 | 0 | 0 | 0 | 0 |
| Erkut Kızılırmak | Turkey | 2005 | 0 | 0 | 2 | 1 | 0 | 0 | 0 | 0 | 0 |
| Thomas Klenke | Germany | 2005 | 0 | / | 16 | 14 | 0 | 0 | 0 | 0 | 0 |
| Mikhail Kozlovskiy | Russia | 2013–2015 | 0 | / | 49 | 48 | 0 | 0 | 0 | 0 | 11 |
| Sergey Krylov | Russia | 2007 | 0 | 0 | 2 | 2 | 0 | 0 | 0 | 0 | 0 |
| Kuok Io Keong | Macau | 2010–2011 | 0 | 0 | 4 | 0 | 0 | 0 | 0 | 0 | 0 |
| Gary Kwok | Canada | 2011 | 0 | 0 | 2 | 2 | 0 | 0 | 0 | 0 | 0 |
| Eric Kwong | Hong Kong | 2012 | 0 | 0 | 2 | 2 | 0 | 0 | 0 | 0 | 0 |
| Henry Kwong | Hong Kong | 2014 | 0 | 0 | 4 | 4 | 0 | 0 | 0 | 0 | 0 |
| Adam Lacko | Czech Republic | 2005 | 0 | 0 | 6 | 5 | 0 | 0 | 0 | 0 | 0 |
| Kirill Ladygin | Russia | 2008–2009 | 0 | 0 | 32 | 29 | 0 | 0 | 0 | 0 | 0 |
| Lam Kam San | Macau | 2013 | 0 | 0 | 2 | 2 | 0 | 0 | 0 | 0 | 0 |
| Nicolas Lapierre | France | 2015 | 0 | / | 8 | 7 | 0 | 0 | 0 | 0 | 8 |
| Andrea Larini | Italy | 2005, 2009 | 0 | 0 | 8 | 7 | 0 | 0 | 0 | 0 | 0 |
| Nicola Larini | Italy | 2005–2009 | 0 | / | 110 | 107 | 1 | 1 | 13 | 2 | 179 |
| Henry Lee Junior | Hong Kong | 2007 | 0 | 0 | 2 | 1 | 0 | 0 | 0 | 0 | 0 |
| Marchy Lee | Hong Kong | 2011 | 0 | 0 | 6 | 5 | 0 | 0 | 0 | 0 | 0 |
| Sébastien Loeb | France | 2014-2015 | 0 | 0 | 47 | 47 | 1 | 6 | 20 | 7 | 651 |
| William Lok | Hong Kong | 2014 | 0 | 0 | 4 | 2 | 0 | 0 | 0 | 0 | 0 |
| Lei Kit Meng | Macau | 2009 | 0 | 0 | 2 | 2 | 0 | 0 | 0 | 0 | 0 |
| Kelvin Leong | Macau | 2012 | 0 | 0 | 2 | 2 | 0 | 0 | 0 | 0 | 0 |
| Liu Lic Ka | Macau | 2009, 2012 | 0 | 0 | 4 | 3 | 0 | 0 | 0 | 0 | 0 |
| Lo Ka Chun | Hong Kong | 2011 | 0 | 0 | 2 | 0 | 0 | 0 | 0 | 0 | 0 |
| Lo Ka Fai | Hong Kong | 2005 | 0 | 0 | 2 | 0 | 0 | 0 | 0 | 0 | 0 |
| José María López† | Argentina | 2013–2016 | 3; 2014–2016 | 0 | 72 | 72 | 18 | 28 | 47 | 28 | 1353 |
| David Louie | Hong Kong | 2007 | 0 | 0 | 2 | 2 | 0 | 0 | 0 | 0 | 0 |
| Alexander Lvov | Russia | 2007–2008 | 0 | 0 | 6 | 6 | 0 | 0 | 0 | 0 | 0 |
| Philip Ma | Hong Kong | 2010–2011 | 0 | 0 | 6 | 6 | 0 | 0 | 0 | 0 | 0 |
| Qing Hua Ma | China | 2014-2015, 2017 | 0 | 0 | 36 | 36 | 1 | 2 | 8 | 2 | 310 |
| Alex MacDowall | England | 2012–2013 | 0 | 0 | 48 | 48 | 0 | 0 | 3 | 2 | 209 |
| Luís Pedro Magalhães | Portugal | 2007 | 0 | 0 | 2 | 2 | 0 | 0 | 0 | 0 | 0 |
| Jan Magnussen | Denmark | 2006 | 0 | / | 2 | 2 | 0 | 0 | 0 | 0 | 0 |
| Ka Lok Mak | Macau | 2011–2014, 2017 | 0 | 0 | 14 | 14 | 0 | 0 | 0 | 0 | 0 |
| Valle Mäkelä | Finland | 2005 | 0 | 0 | 10 | 10 | 0 | 0 | 0 | 0 | 0 |
| Elio Marchetti | Italy | 2006 | 0 | 0 | 4 | 3 | 0 | 0 | 0 | 0 | 0 |
| Matthew Marsh | Hong Kong | 2008 | 0 | 0 | 4 | 4 | 0 | 0 | 0 | 0 | 1 |
| Carlos Mastretta | Mexico | 2005 | 0 | 0 | 4 | 4 | 0 | 0 | 0 | 0 | 0 |
| Michal Matějovský | Czech Republic | 2008 | 0 | 0 | 2 | 2 | 0 | 0 | 0 | 0 | 0 |
| Alain Menu | Switzerland | 2005–2012 | 0 | 0 | 180 | 177 | 13 | 21 | 53 | 18 | 1091 |
| Joseph Rosa Merszei | Macau | 2009–2013 | 0 | 0 | 10 | 10 | 0 | 0 | 0 | 0 | 0 |
| Norbert Michelisz | Hungary | 2008–2017 | 0 | 3; 2010, 2012, 2015 | 185 | 183 | 12 | 8 | 37 | 6 | 1394 |
| Ryo Michigami | Japan | 2016–2017 | 0 | 0 | 22 | 22 | 1 | 0 | 1 | 0 | 20 |
| Nikita Misiulia | Russia | 2014 | 0 | 0 | 2 | 2 | 0 | 0 | 0 | 0 | 0 |
| Luca Molo | Brazil | 2006 | 0 | 0 | 2 | 2 | 0 | 0 | 0 | 0 | 0 |
| Fernando Monje | Spain | 2012–2013 | 0 | 0 | 34 | 34 | 0 | 0 | 0 | 0 | 3 |
| Tiago Monteiro | Portugal | 2007–2017 | 0 | / | 218 | 215 | 11 | 11 | 44 | 8 | 1269 |
| Gianni Morbidelli | Italy | 2006, 2014 | 0 | / | 45 | 42 | 0 | 1 | 1 | 0 | 131 |
| Dirk Müller | Germany | 2005–2006 | 0 | / | 40 | 39 | 1 | 4 | 9 | 4 | 140 |
| Jörg Müller | Germany | 2005–2009 | 0 | / | 110 | 107 | 3 | 10 | 29 | 15 | 333 |
| Yvan Muller† | France | 2006–2017 | 4; 2008, 2010–2011, 2013 | / | 255 | 252 | 33 | 47 | 128 | 39 | 2934 |
| René Münnich | Germany | 2012–2014, 2016 | 0 | 0 | 53 | 52 | 0 | 0 | 0 | 0 | 5 |
| Dániel Nagy | Hungary | 2016–2017 | 0 | 0 | 30 | 30 | 0 | 0 | 0 | 1 | 1 |
| Norbert Nagy | Hungary | 2014 | 0 | 0 | 2 | 2 | 0 | 0 | 0 | 0 | 0 |
| James Nash | England | 2012–2013 | 0 | 1; 2013 | 48 | 47 | 0 | 2 | 5 | 0 | 238 |
| Emanuele Naspetti | Italy | 2006 | 0 | 0 | 4 | 3 | 0 | 0 | 0 | 0 | 0 |
| Charles Ng | Hong Kong | 2011–2013 | 0 | 0 | 54 | 53 | 0 | 0 | 0 | 0 | 9 |
| Oscar Nogués | Spain | 2006–2008 | 0 | 0 | 6 | 5 | 0 | 0 | 0 | 0 | 0 |
| Michel Nykjær | Denmark | 2009–2013 | 0 | 0 | 68 | 68 | 2 | 3 | 7 | 2 | 352 |
| Emmet O'Brien | Ireland | 2007 | 0 | 0 | 12 | 12 | 0 | 0 | 0 | 0 | 0 |
| İbrahim Okyay | Turkey | 2006, 2008, 2011 | 0 | 0 | 30 | 29 | 0 | 0 | 0 | 0 | 0 |
| Manabu Orido | Japan | 2008 | 0 | 0 | 6 | 6 | 0 | 0 | 0 | 0 | 2 |
| Pepe Oriola | Spain | 2011–2014 | 0 | 0 | 74 | 72 | 0 | 1 | 6 | 4 | 306 |
| Stéphane Ortelli | Monaco | 2005 | 0 | 0 | 6 | 6 | 0 | 0 | 0 | 0 | 3 |
| Darryl O'Young | China | 2010–2013 | 0 | 0 | 94 | 90 | 1 | 0 | 0 | 0 | 102 |
| Aurélien Panis | France | 2017 | 0 | 0 | 10 | 9 | 0 | 0 | 0 | 0 | 2 |
| Massimiliano Pedalà | Italy | 2007 | 0 | 0 | 8 | 8 | 0 | 0 | 0 | 0 | 0 |
| José Manuel Pérez-Aicart | Spain | 2008 | 0 | 0 | 2 | 2 | 0 | 0 | 0 | 0 | 0 |
| Leonel Pernía | Argentina | 2010 | 0 | 0 | 2 | 2 | 0 | 0 | 0 | 0 | 1 |
| Jason Plato | England | 2005 | 0 | / | 8 | 8 | 0 | 0 | 1 | 0 | 10 |
| Sascha Plöderl | Austria | 2005 | 0 | 0 | 6 | 5 | 0 | 0 | 0 | 0 | 0 |
| Paul Poon | Hong Kong | 2005 | 0 | 0 | 2 | 0 | 0 | 0 | 0 | 0 | 0 |
| Félix Porteiro | Spain | 2007–2009 | 0 | 0 | 70 | 69 | 1 | 2 | 7 | 1 | 93 |
| Vito Postiglione | Italy | 2009 | 0 | 0 | 8 | 8 | 0 | 0 | 0 | 0 | 0 |
| Kristian Poulsen | Denmark | 2008–2011 | 0 | 1; 2011 | 74 | 74 | 0 | 0 | 1 | 0 | 132 |
| Andy Priaulx† | England | 2005–2010 | 3; 2005–2007 | / | 132 | 132 | 5 | 18 | 47 | 16 | 677 |
| Diego Puyo | Spain | 2009 | 0 | 0 | 2 | 2 | 0 | 0 | 0 | 0 | 0 |
| Vincent Radermecker | Belgium | 2006, 2010 | 0 | 0 | 6 | 6 | 0 | 0 | 0 | 0 | 0 |
| Luca Rangoni | Italy | 2006–2007 | 0 | 0 | 42 | 41 | 0 | 0 | 2 | 1 | 29 |
| Kris Richard | Switzerland | 2017 | 0 | 0 | 4 | 4 | 0 | 0 | 0 | 0 | 10 |
| Davide Roda | Italy | 2006–2007 | 0 | 0 | 6 | 6 | 0 | 0 | 0 | 0 | 0 |
| Riccardo Romagnoli | Italy | 2006 | 0 | 0 | 4 | 4 | 0 | 0 | 0 | 0 | 0 |
| Diego Romanini | Italy | 2006–2007 | 0 | 0 | 20 | 20 | 0 | 0 | 0 | 0 | 0 |
| Andrei Romanov | Russia | 2007–2008, 2010 | 0 | 0 | 44 | 42 | 0 | 0 | 0 | 0 | 0 |
| Carl Rosenblad | Sweden | 2005, 2007 | 0 | 0 | 24 | 22 | 0 | 0 | 0 | 0 | 0 |
| Michaël Rossi | France | 2010 | 0 | 0 | 2 | 2 | 0 | 0 | 0 | 0 | 0 |
| Tommy Rustad | Norway | 2009 | 0 | 0 | 2 | 2 | 0 | 0 | 0 | 0 | 0 |
| Rickard Rydell | Sweden | 2005–2009, 2012–2013, 2015 | 0 | / | 102 | 100 | 3 | 5 | 25 | 5 | 283 |
| Timur Sadredinov | Russia | 2007 | 0 | 0 | 2 | 2 | 0 | 0 | 0 | 0 | 0 |
| Ismaïl Sbaï | Morocco | 2010 | 0 | 0 | 2 | 1 | 0 | 0 | 0 | 0 | 0 |
| Peter Scharmach | New Zealand | 2005 | 0 | 0 | 2 | 2 | 0 | 0 | 0 | 0 | 0 |
| Sabine Schmitz | Germany | 2015–2016 | 0 | 0 | 4 | 4 | 0 | 0 | 0 | 0 | 2 |
| Viktor Shapovalov | Russia | 2007–2009 | 0 | 0 | 34 | 31 | 0 | 0 | 0 | 0 | 0 |
| Ryan Sharp | Scotland | 2006 | 0 | 0 | 14 | 14 | 0 | 0 | 1 | 1 | 6 |
| David Sigachev | Russia | 2011 | 0 | 0 | 2 | 2 | 0 | 0 | 0 | 0 | 0 |
| Andrey Smetsky | Russia | 2007–2008 | 0 | 0 | 6 | 6 | 0 | 0 | 0 | 0 | 0 |
| Urs Sonderegger | Switzerland | 2011 | 0 | 0 | 8 | 6 | 0 | 0 | 0 | 0 | 0 |
| Michael Soong | Hong Kong | 2013–2014 | 0 | 0 | 4 | 2 | 0 | 0 | 0 | 0 | 0 |
| Tin Sritrai | Thailand | 2015 | 0 | 0 | 2 | 2 | 0 | 0 | 0 | 0 | 3 |
| Zsolt Szabó | Hungary | 2017 | 0 | 0 | 10 | 10 | 0 | 0 | 0 | 0 | 1 |
| Hironori Takeuchi | Japan | 2005 | 0 | 0 | 2 | 0 | 0 | 0 | 0 | 0 | 0 |
| George Tanev | Bulgaria | 2008–2009 | 0 | 0 | 12 | 12 | 0 | 0 | 0 | 0 | 0 |
| Nobuteru Taniguchi | Japan | 2010 | 0 | 0 | 4 | 4 | 0 | 0 | 0 | 0 | 0 |
| Yukinori Taniguchi | Japan | 2008, 2010–2011, 2013–2014 | 0 | 0 | 44 | 41 | 0 | 0 | 0 | 0 | 10 |
| Gabriele Tarquini† | Italy | 2005–2017 | 1; 2009 | / | 276 | 272 | 17 | 21 | 68 | 22 | 1707 |
| Salvatore Tavano | Italy | 2005–2006 | 0 | 0 | 26 | 25 | 1 | 1 | 1 | - | 15 |
| Felice Tedeschi | Italy | 2012 | 0 | 0 | 2 | 0 | 0 | 0 | 0 | 0 | 0 |
| Peter Terting | Germany | 2005–2006 | 0 | / | 40 | 40 | 0 | 1 | 5 | 1 | 80 |
| James Thompson | England | 2005–2009, 2012–2016 | 0 | / | 165 | 156 | 4 | 4 | 16 | 7 | 312 |
| Olivier Tielemans | Netherlands | 2007–2008 | 0 | 0 | 32 | 30 | 0 | 0 | 0 | 0 | 1 |
| Colin Turkington | Northern Ireland | 2007, 2010–2012 | 0 | 0 | 22 | 22 | 0 | 1 | 6 | 1 | 158 |
| Isaac Tutumlu | Spain | 2012 | 0 | 0 | 6 | 5 | 0 | 0 | 0 | 0 | 0 |
| Hugo Valente | France | 2012–2016 | 0 | 0 | 85 | 82 | 5 | 0 | 6 | 2 | 287 |
| Stefano Valli | San Marino | 2005–2006 | 0 | 0 | 10 | 8 | 0 | 0 | 0 | 0 | 0 |
| Jaap van Lagen | Netherlands | 2008–2009 | 0 | 0 | 54 | 50 | 0 | 0 | 0 | 0 | 16 |
| Harry Vaulkhard | England | 2010 | 0 | 0 | 14 | 14 | 0 | 0 | 0 | 0 | 1 |
| Javier Villa | Spain | 2011 | 0 | 0 | 24 | 24 | 0 | 0 | 1 | 1 | 59 |
| Polo Villaamil | Spain | 2005 | 0 | 0 | 2 | 2 | 0 | 0 | 0 | 0 | 0 |
| Jan Vonka | Czech Republic | 2006 | 0 | 0 | 2 | 2 | 0 | 0 | 0 | 0 | 0 |
| Jason Watt | Denmark | 2009 | 0 | 0 | 2 | 2 | 0 | 0 | 0 | 0 | 0 |
| Masataka Yanagida | Japan | 2010 | 0 | 0 | 2 | 2 | 0 | 0 | 0 | 0 | 0 |
| Hiroki Yoshimoto | Japan | 2011–2013 | 0 | 0 | 6 | 6 | 0 | 0 | 0 | 0 | 0 |
| Gábor Wéber | Hungary | 2012 | 0 | 0 | 12 | 12 | 0 | 0 | 0 | 0 | 3 |
| Alessandro Zanardi | Italy | 2005–2009 | 0 | / | 110 | 115 | 1 | 4 | 10 | 4 | 143 |
| Evgeny Zelenov | Russia | 2007 | 0 | 0 | 2 | 2 | 0 | 0 | 0 | 0 | 0 |
