= 2010 Guia Race of Macau =

Race details
- Round 11 of 11 in the 2010 World Touring Car Championship at Guia Circuit in Macau.
- Date: 21 November, 2010
- Location: Macau
- Course: Guia Circuit; 6.117 kilometres (3.801 mi)

Race One
- Laps: 11
Pole position
Driver		(United Kingdom) Robert Huff	Chevrolet RML
Time		2:31.321	
Podium
First		(United Kingdom) Robert Huff	Chevrolet RML
Second		(France) Yvan Muller	Chevrolet RML
Third		(Portugal) Tiago Monteiro	SR-Sport
Fastest Lap
Driver		(United Kingdom) Robert Huff	Chevrolet RML
Time		2:33.560	

Race Two
- Laps: 10
Podium
First		(Hungary) Norbert Michelisz	Zengő-Dension Team
Second		(Italy) Gabriele Tarquini	SR-Sport
Third		(United Kingdom) Robert Huff	Chevrolet RML
Fastest Lap
Driver		(United Kingdom) Robert Huff	Chevrolet RML
Time		2:32.766	

The 2010 Guia Race of Macau (formally the 2010 Guia Race of Macau, presented by Sociedade de Jogos de Macau) was the eleventh and final round of the 2010 World Touring Car Championship season and the sixth running of the Guia Race of Macau as a World Touring Car Championship round. It was held at the Guia Circuit on the streets of Macau on 21 November 2010. The race was part of the Macau Grand Prix weekend, headlined by the 2010 Macau Grand Prix Formula Three.

Chevrolet sealed their first manufacturers' championship while Sergio Hernández secured the Yokohama Independents' Trophy for the second time.

Race one was won by polesitter Robert Huff of Chevrolet RML, while Norbert Michelisz took his maiden victory in race two, driving for Zengő-Dension Team.

== Background ==
The drivers' championship was decided after the FIA found the use of sequential gearboxes by BMW Team RBM at the Race of Japan to be illegal and both of their drivers, Andy Priaulx and Augusto Farfus were stripped of all points earned at the event. This meant Yvan Muller of the factory Chevrolet team secured the world drivers' championship title. Outgoing champion Gabriele Tarquini was still defending second in the championship ahead of Priaulx and Huff. Hernández was leading the Yokohama Independents' Trophy which was still to be decided.

Stefano D'Aste opted to miss the final round of the season in order to attend the Monza Rally Show, despite still being in mathematical contention for the Yokohama Trophy title. André Couto joined SR-Sport for the event, driving the car previously raced by Jordi Gené and Michaël Rossi. Local driver Jo Merszei joined Liqui Moly Team Engstler, as did Japanese racer Masaki Kano. Jacob & Co Racing ran a Honda Accord Euro R for Hong Kong driver Philip Ma and Portuguese team Team Novadriver Total ran a BMW 320si for César Campaniço. Another Honda Accord was entered for their driver Kuok Io Keong and Chan Kin Man raced a self–run Honda Civic Type R.

== Report ==
=== Testing and free practice ===
Huff topped an interrupted opening test session on Thursday, with team–mate Alain Menu second. New champion Muller was fifth and Couto was the fastest of the local drivers in tenth. The first stoppage occurred just one lap into the session when Chan Kin Man and Andrei Romanov crashed at the Hospital Bend. Then ten minutes from the end, Kano clipped the barriers at the R–Bend to bring out the red flags again.

Huff topped the times in free practice one on Friday, Priaulx was second and Monteiro was third.

Free practice two saw Huff complete his testing and practice domination, topping the times with Muller second and Monteiro third for the second session in a row. The session had been delayed as barrier repairs were required following the preceding support race session with FP2 starting two hours later than scheduled. The session was not stopped at any point, however Mehdi Bennani spun his Wiechers-Sport BMW at R–Bend and Fredy Barth stopped after hitting the barriers at Faraway in his SEAT.

=== Qualifying ===
Having led all the practice sessions, Huff went on take pole position in a lengthened qualifying which went into a second day. The first session started on Friday afternoon but almost immediately the red flags came out when Tom Coronel hit the barriers at Fishermen's Bend. Once the barriers were repaired, the session resumed but Priaulx hit the barrier at R–Bend. He broke the front left wheel off his BMW and slowly returned to the pits but the session was stopped again as Kano spun his Engstler BMW at the first corner and was stranded in the middle of the track. Qualifying resumed once again but Kristian Poulsen brought the session to a half for a third time when he collided with the barriers at Paiol with his BMW ending up parked across the track. Scuderia Proteam Motorsport driver Hernández then crashed while trying to avoid Poulsen's stranded car. By this time it was getting dark and when the session restarted Muller set the fastest time with Huff second. Coronel stopped on track and Q1 was brought to a close after running for almost two hours. The race director decided to delay Q2 until the following morning as darkness set in.

After Q2 had taken place on Saturday morning, Huff took pole position and Michelisz qualified second. A race one grid penalty for the Hungarian driver would see Muller start alongside his Chevrolet team–mate on the front row and Menu would make it a Chevrolet 1–2–3. Muller had hit the barrier at Lisboa in the opening minutes while trying to get ahead of Couto. Monteiro was the leading SR–Sport driver by ending up fifth and Farfus was the leading BMW in sixth. Tarquini, Priaulx, Darryl O'Young and Couto completed the top ten.

=== Warm-Up ===
Pole sitter Huff was quickest in the Sunday morning warm–up session, O'Young the fastest independent driver.

=== Race One ===
Huff led away from pole position followed by Muller while further back there was contact between Priaulx and Couto with both ending up in the barrier at turn one. Couto and Michel Nykjær, who had also been caught up in the incident, both retired while Priaulx limped back to the pits for repairs. As the pack of cars approached Lisboa, Menu outbraked himself and collided with the wall which dropped him from third to fifteenth. The safety came out on the first lap while the cars of Couto and Nykjær were cleared up. After the race was resumed, O'Young was tapped by the SEAT of Coronel, he lost control of his Chevrolet Lacetti and crashed into the wall at Lisboa having also collected Barth. Coronel was handed a drive–through penalty for causing the collision. Three laps from the end, Huff led Muller and Monteiro while Farfus was defending fourth from Tarquini. The BMW driver was eventually passed by the Italian and then by Michelisz. Ho brought out the final safety car when he crashed and his car came to a rest blocking the track. The race ended under the safety car with Huff claiming the victory, Muller second, Monteiro third, Tarquini fourth, Michelisz fifth and Farfus sixth. Menu had hauled himself back up from fifteenth to seventh to beat Yokohama Trophy winner Poulsen.

=== Race Two ===
Poulsen started from the reversed grid pole but was passed by Michelisz and Tarquini at the Mandarin curve. Front row starter Menu had stalled and Farfus had dropped down to fourth at the start, he was however able to elevate himself to third at the expense of Poulsen approaching Lisboa. The race was stopped on the first lap when Romanov, O'Young and Nobuteru Taniguchi collided and blocked the track at Police with the rest of the field stuck behind them. Damage sustained in the pileup also forced Barth and Yukinori Taniguchi to retire. The race was restarted behind the safety car with Michelisz leading Tarquini and Farfus. Colin Turkington served a drive–through penalty after his mechanics continued to work on his car after the three-minute board was shown on the grid. Muller and Huff passed Poulsen before Muller let his team–mate pass him in order to catch Farfus. In attempting a pass, Huff knocked Farfus' rear bumper off but was eventually able to pass and started to close in on Tarquini. Farfus dropped down the order further when Muller passed him on lap nine. Kano and Campaniço both crashed out the race. Michelisz led until the end to claim his first WTCC win with Tarquini second and race one winner Huff third. Hernández beat Engstler to finish ninth and claim the Yokohama Trophy title for the second time.

== Results ==
=== Qualifying ===
Pos.	No.	Name	Team	Car	C	Q1	Q2
1	7	(United Kingdom) Robert Huff	Chevrolet RML	Chevrolet Cruze LT		2:32.323	2:31.321
2	5	(Hungary) Norbert Michelisz	Zengő-Dension Team	SEAT León 2.0 TDI		2:33.013	2:31.728
3	6	(France) Yvan Muller	Chevrolet RML	Chevrolet Cruze LT		2:31.948	2:31.773
4	8	(Switzerland) Alain Menu	Chevrolet RML	Chevrolet Cruze LT		2:32.809	2:31.862
5	3	(Portugal) Tiago Monteiro	SR-Sport	SEAT León 2.0 TDI		2:32.416	2:31.946
6	10	(Brazil) Augusto Farfus	BMW Team RBM	BMW 320si		2:33.610	2:32.222
7	1	(Italy) Gabriele Tarquini	SR-Sport	SEAT León 2.0 TDI		2:33.274	2:32.222
8	11	(United Kingdom) Andy Priaulx	BMW Team RBM	BMW 320si		2:33.331	2:32.478
9	20	(Hong Kong) Darryl O'Young	bamboo-engineering	Chevrolet Lacetti	Y	2:33.197	2:33.185
10	66	(Macau) André Couto	SR-Sport	SEAT León 2.0 TDI		2:33.869	2:37.073
11	18	(Switzerland) Fredy Barth	SEAT Swiss Racing by SUNRED	SEAT León 2.0 TDI		2:34.045	
12	17	(Denmark) Michel Nykjær	SUNRED Engineering	SEAT León 2.0 TDI		2:34.190	
13	2	(Netherlands) Tom Coronel	SR-Sport	SEAT León 2.0 TDI		2:34.191	
14	25	(Spain) Sergio Hernández	Scuderia Proteam Motorsport	BMW 320si	Y	2:34.869	
15	29	(United Kingdom) Colin Turkington	Team Aviva-COFCO	BMW 320si		2:35.246	
16	15	(Germany) Franz Engstler	Liqui Moly Team Engstler	BMW 320si	Y	2:37.094	
17	21	(Morocco) Mehdi Bennani	Wiechers-Sport	BMW 320si	Y	2:37.984	
18	72	(Japan) Yukinori Taniguchi	bamboo-engineering	Chevrolet Lacetti	Y	2:39.267	
19	63	(Portugal) César Campaniço	Team Novadriver Total	BMW 320si	Y	2:40.315	
20	51	(Macau) Henry Ho	Ho Chun Kei / Sports & You Asia	BMW 320si	Y	2:40.396	
21	45	(Taiwan) Kevin Chen	Scuderia Proteam Motorsport	BMW 320si	Y	2:40.840	
22	43	(Japan) Nobuteru Taniguchi	Scuderia Proteam Motorsport	BMW 320si	Y	2:40.897	
23	24	(Denmark) Kristian Poulsen	Poulsen Motorsport	BMW 320si	Y	2:42.455	
107% time: 2:42.584
–	50	(Macau) Jo Merszei	Liqui Moly Team Engstler	BMW 320si	Y	2:45.002	
–	47	(Japan) Masaki Kano	Liqui Moly Team Engstler	BMW 320si	Y	2:45.574	
–	16	(Russia) Andrei Romanov	Liqui Moly Team Engstler	BMW 320si	Y	no time set	
–	53	(Hong Kong) Philip Ma	Jacob & Co Racing	Honda Accord Euro R	Y	no time set	

=== Race 1 ===
Pos.	No.	Name	Team	Car	C	Laps	Time/Retired	Grid	Points
1	7	(United Kingdom) **Robert Huff**	Chevrolet RML	Chevrolet Cruze LT		11	35:34.840	1	25
2	6	(France) Yvan Muller	Chevrolet RML	Chevrolet Cruze LT		11	+0.366	2	18
3	3	(Portugal) Tiago Monteiro	SR-Sport	SEAT León 2.0 TDI		11	+0.631	4	15
4	1	(Italy) Gabriele Tarquini	SR-Sport	SEAT León 2.0 TDI		11	+0.909	6	12
5	5	(Hungary) Norbert Michelisz	Zengő-Dension Team	SEAT León 2.0 TDI		11	+1.306	7	10
6	10	(Brazil) Augusto Farfus	BMW Team RBM	BMW 320si		11	+1.967	5	8
7	8	(Switzerland) Alain Menu	Chevrolet RML	Chevrolet Cruze LT		11	+2.564	3	6
8	24	(Denmark) Kristian Poulsen	Poulsen Motorsport	BMW 320si	Y	11	+2.823	21	4
9	15	(Germany) Franz Engstler	Liqui Moly Team Engstler	BMW 320si	Y	11	+3.503	16	2
10	21	(Morocco) Mehdi Bennani	Wiechers-Sport	BMW 320si	Y	11	+3.998	22	1
11	25	(Spain) Sergio Hernández	Scuderia Proteam Motorsport	BMW 320si	Y	11	+4.614	14	
12	2	(Netherlands) Tom Coronel	SR-Sport	SEAT León 2.0 TDI		11	+4.770	13	
13	72	(Japan) Yukinori Taniguchi	bamboo-engineering	Chevrolet Lacetti	Y	11	+8.465	17	
14	63	(Portugal) César Campaniço	Team Novadriver Total	BMW 320si	Y	11	+8.961	18	
15	16	(Russia) Andrei Romanov	Liqui Moly Team Engstler	BMW 320si	Y	11	+9.439	25	
16	43	(Japan) Nobuteru Taniguchi	Scuderia Proteam Motorsport	BMW 320si	Y	11	+13.059	20	
17	45	(Taiwan) Kevin Chen	Scuderia Proteam Motorsport	BMW 320si	Y	11	+24.421	23	
18	53	(Hong Kong) Philip Ma	Jacob & Co Racing	Honda Accord Euro R	Y	11	+26.043	26	
19	50	(Macau) Jo Merszei	Liqui Moly Team Engstler	BMW 320si	Y	11	+27.592	24	
20	47	(Japan) Masaki Kano	Liqui Moly Team Engstler	BMW 320si	Y	10	+1 Lap	27	
21	51	(Macau) Henry Ho	Ho Chun Kei / Sports & You Asia	BMW 320si	Y	8	+3 Laps	19	
NC	11	(United Kingdom) Andy Priaulx	BMW Team RBM	BMW 320si		7	+4 Laps	8	
Ret	20	(Hong Kong) Darryl O'Young	bamboo-engineering	Chevrolet Lacetti	Y	4	Race incident	9	
Ret	18	(Switzerland) Fredy Barth	SEAT Swiss Racing by SUNRED	SEAT León 2.0 TDI		4	Race incident	11	
Ret	29	(United Kingdom) Colin Turkington	Team Aviva-COFCO	BMW 320si		4	Transmission	15	
Ret	66	(Macau) André Couto	SR-Sport	SEAT León 2.0 TDI		0	Race incident	10	
Ret	17	(Denmark) Michel Nykjær	SUNRED Engineering	SEAT León 2.0 TDI		0	Race incident	12	

- **Bold** denotes Fastest lap.

=== Race 2 ===
Pos.	No.	Name	Team	Car	C	Laps	Time/Retired	Grid	Points
1	5	(Hungary) Norbert Michelisz	Zengő-Dension Team	SEAT León 2.0 TDI		10	54:37.415	4	25
2	1	(Italy) Gabriele Tarquini	SR-Sport	SEAT León 2.0 TDI		10	+1.193	5	18
3	7	(United Kingdom) **Robert Huff**	Chevrolet RML	Chevrolet Cruze LT		10	+1.543	8	15
4	6	(France) Yvan Muller	Chevrolet RML	Chevrolet Cruze LT		10	+10.886	7	12
5	10	(Brazil) Augusto Farfus	BMW Team RBM	BMW 320si		10	+14.675	3	10
6	2	(Netherlands) Tom Coronel	SR-Sport	SEAT León 2.0 TDI		10	+14.894	12	8
7	11	(United Kingdom) Andy Priaulx	BMW Team RBM	BMW 320si		10	+15.716	22	6
8	3	(Portugal) Tiago Monteiro	SR-Sport	SEAT León 2.0 TDI		10	+16.360	6	4
9	25	(Spain) Sergio Hernández	Scuderia Proteam Motorsport	BMW 320si	Y	10	+20.951	11	2
10	15	(Germany) Franz Engstler	Liqui Moly Team Engstler	BMW 320si	Y	10	+25.099	9	1
11	17	(Denmark) Michel Nykjær	SUNRED Engineering	SEAT León 2.0 TDI		10	+43.156	26	
12	21	(Morocco) Mehdi Bennani	Wiechers-Sport	BMW 320si	Y	10	+47.302	10	
13	29	(United Kingdom) Colin Turkington	Team Aviva-COFCO	BMW 320si		10	+1:01.671	27	
14	45	(Taiwan) Kevin Chen	Scuderia Proteam Motorsport	BMW 320si	Y	10	+1:47.235	17	
15	53	(Hong Kong) Philip Ma	Jacob & Co Racing	Honda Accord Euro R	Y	10	+1:52.404	18	
16	63	(Portugal) César Campaniço	Team Novadriver Total	BMW 320si	Y	8	+2 Laps	14	
Ret	47	(Japan) Masaki Kano	Liqui Moly Team Engstler	BMW 320si	Y	6	Race incident	20	
Ret	24	(Denmark) Kristian Poulsen	Poulsen Motorsport	BMW 320si	Y	4	Race incident	1	
Ret	50	(Macau) Jo Merszei	Liqui Moly Team Engstler	BMW 320si	Y	3	Race incident	19	
Ret	8	(Switzerland) Alain Menu	Chevrolet RML	Chevrolet Cruze LT		2	Clutch	2	
Ret	16	(Russia) Andrei Romanov	Liqui Moly Team Engstler	BMW 320si	Y	0	Race incident	15	
Ret	43	(Japan) Nobuteru Taniguchi	Scuderia Proteam Motorsport	BMW 320si	Y	0	Race incident	16	
Ret	72	(Japan) Yukinori Taniguchi	bamboo-engineering	Chevrolet Lacetti	Y	0	Race incident	13	
Ret	18	(Switzerland) Fredy Barth	SEAT Swiss Racing by SUNRED	SEAT León 2.0 TDI		0	Race incident	25	
Ret	20	(Hong Kong) Darryl O'Young	bamboo-engineering	Chevrolet Lacetti	Y	0	Race incident	23	
DNS	51	(Macau) Henry Ho	Ho Chun Kei / Sports & You Asia	BMW 320si	Y	0	Did not start	21	
DNS	66	(Macau) André Couto	SR-Sport	SEAT León 2.0 TDI		0	Did not start	24	

- **Bold** denotes Fastest lap.

== Standings after the event ==
Drivers' Championship standings

	Pos	Driver	Points
	1	(France) Yvan Muller	331
	2	(Italy) Gabriele Tarquini	276
1	3	(United Kingdom) Robert Huff	276
1	4	(United Kingdom) Andy Priaulx	246
1	5	(Portugal) Tiago Monteiro	177

Yokohama Independents' Trophy standings

	Pos	Driver	Points
	1	(Spain) Sergio Hernández	156
2	2	(Germany) Franz Engstler	127
	3	(Denmark) Kristian Poulsen	117
2	4	(Hong Kong) Darryl O'Young	104
3	5	(Morocco) Mehdi Bennani	91

Manufacturers' Championship standings

Pos	Manufacturer	Points
1	(United States) Chevrolet	715
2	(Spain) SEAT Customers Technology	641
3	(Germany) BMW	580

- Note: Only the top five positions are included for both sets of drivers' standings.
