= Philip Ma =

Hong Kong racing driver (born 1963)

Philip Ma 馬清揚
- Nationality: Hong Kong
- Born: May 1, 1963 (age 63) Hong Kong

Philip Ma Ching Yeung ((in Chinese): 馬清揚) (born 1 May 1963) is a racing driver from Hong Kong, who has raced in the World Touring Car Championship.

== Personal life ==
Philip Ma's family are owners of the Tai Sang Bank. He married his wife Winnie Chin in 1995, who was 1st runner's up in the 1981 Miss Hong Kong Pageant. The jewelry they spent HK$4.5 million on for their wedding banquet was found to be over-valued, and was worth only HK$1.8 million. They sued Emdia Ltd, who operated the jeweler Siba Co. for compensation and was awarded HK$3.21 million on 3 August 2005.

== Career ==
Since 2003, Ma has raced in the Porsche Carrera Cup Asia.

=== Endurance Racing ===
In 2008, Ma invested HK$2million to form Team Hong Kong Racing with two Aston Martin Vantage V8 race cars. The team raced in that year's Merdeka Millennium Endurance Race. Philip Ma's car failed to finish and retired after 139 laps. The team tried again in 2009, Ma this time partnering Christian Jones and Marchy Lee, the trio completed 191 laps and failed to finish again.

Team Hong Kong Racing entered the 2009 1000 km of Okayama, with Ma partnering Jeffrey Lee and Tomáš Enge. Enge set the fastest time in GT2 but was sent to the back of the grid for a wing violation. The team finished race 1 20th overall and 9th in GT2. In race 2, the team finished 18th overall and seventh in GT2.

In October 2010, Mathias Beche teamed up with Ma in the Aston Martin DBRS9 GT3 of Team Hong Kong Racing to race in the 2010 1000 km of Zhuhai race, a round of the Intercontinental Le Mans Cup. The pairing Beche/Ma faced many problems in the race: stop and go penalty, fuel alarm defective, problem at the wheel change, brake pads change, radio interferences... But finally the Aston N91 ended this 1000 km with a second-place finish.

In November 2011, Ma joined AF Corse and partnered Marco Cioci to compete in the 2011 6 Hours of Zhuhai, the final race of the 2011 Intercontinental Le Mans Cup season. Philip Ma qualified the car 26th overall and sixth in GTE Am class. In the race the pair only managed 22 laps and was not classified.

=== World Touring Car Championship ===
Ma raced in the final round of the 2010 World Touring Car Championship season, the 2010 Guia Race of Macau in a Honda Accord Euro R for Jacob & Co. Racing Team. He finished the two races in 18th and 15th.

In 2011, Ma once again took part in the last two rounds of the WTCC with Proteam BMW.

== Racing record ==
=== Complete WTCC results ===
(key) (Races in bold indicate pole position) (Races in italics indicate fastest lap)

Year	Team	Car	1	2	3	4	5	6	7	8	9	10	11	12	13	14	15	16	17	18	19	20	21	22	23	24	DC	Points
2010	Jacob & Co Racing	Honda Accord Euro R	BRA; 1	BRA; 2	MAR; 1	MAR; 2	ITA; 1	ITA; 2	BEL; 1	BEL; 2	POR; 1	POR; 2	GBR; 1	GBR; 2	CZE; 1	CZE; 2	GER; 1	GER; 2	ESP; 1	ESP; 2	JPN; 1	JPN; 2	MAC; 1; 18	MAC; 2; 15			**NC**	**0**
2011	Proteam Racing	BMW 320si	BRA; 1	BRA; 2	BEL; 1	BEL; 2	ITA; 1	ITA; 2	HUN; 1	HUN; 2	CZE; 1	CZE; 2	POR; 1	POR; 2	GBR; 1	GBR; 2	GER; 1	GER; 2	ESP; 1	ESP; 2	JPN; 1	JPN; 2	CHN; 1; 19	CHN; 2; 16	MAC; 1 Ret	MAC; 2; 16	**NC**	**0**

† Season still in progress
