= 2010 World Touring Car Championship =

Motorsport contest

Champions
- World Drivers' Champion: Yvan Muller
- World Manufacturers' Champion: Chevrolet

Seasons
- ← 2009 2011 →

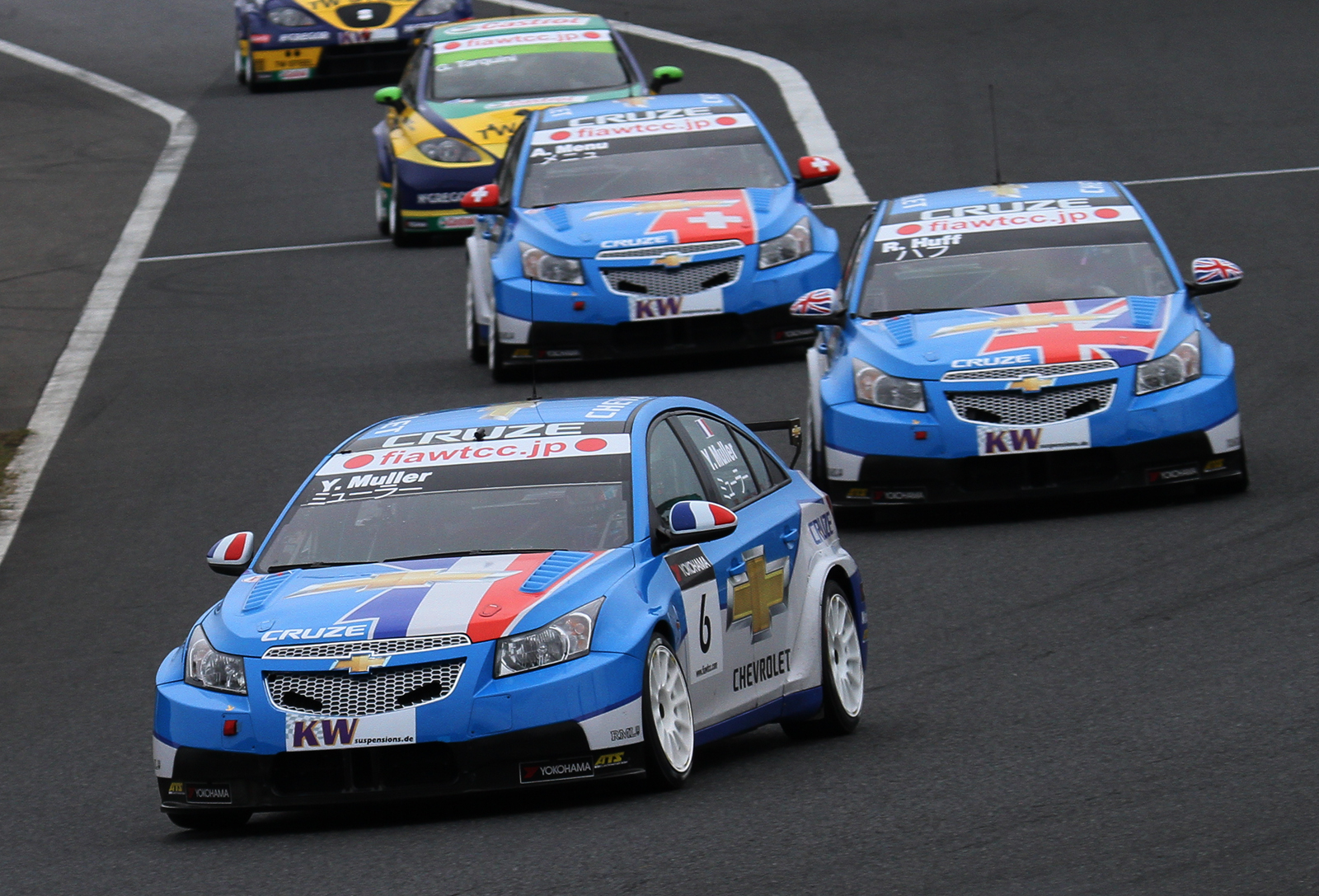
Yvan Muller won his second Drivers' Championship and Chevrolet won the Manufacturers' Championship for the first time.

The 2010 World Touring Car Championship season was the seventh season of the FIA World Touring Car Championship, and the sixth since its 2005 return. It began with the Race of Brazil at Curitiba on 7 March and ended with the Guia Race of Macau at the Guia Circuit on 21 November, after twenty-two races at eleven events. The championship was open to both Super 2000 and Diesel 2000 cars.

A new points system was introduced for the championship in 2010, in alignment with that used for both the Formula One World Championship and the World Rally Championship. The winner of each race received 25 points, continuing with 18, 15, 12, 10, 8, 6, 4, 2 and 1 point for 10th place.

In the week leading up to the final event in Macau, 2008 champion Yvan Muller was confirmed as Drivers' Champion after the BMWs of Augusto Farfus and title rival Andy Priaulx were excluded from the results of the event in Japan, after the FIA overturned a stewards' decision allowing the BMWs to run sequential gearboxes. Chevrolet was awarded the Manufacturers' Championship title.

== Teams and drivers ==
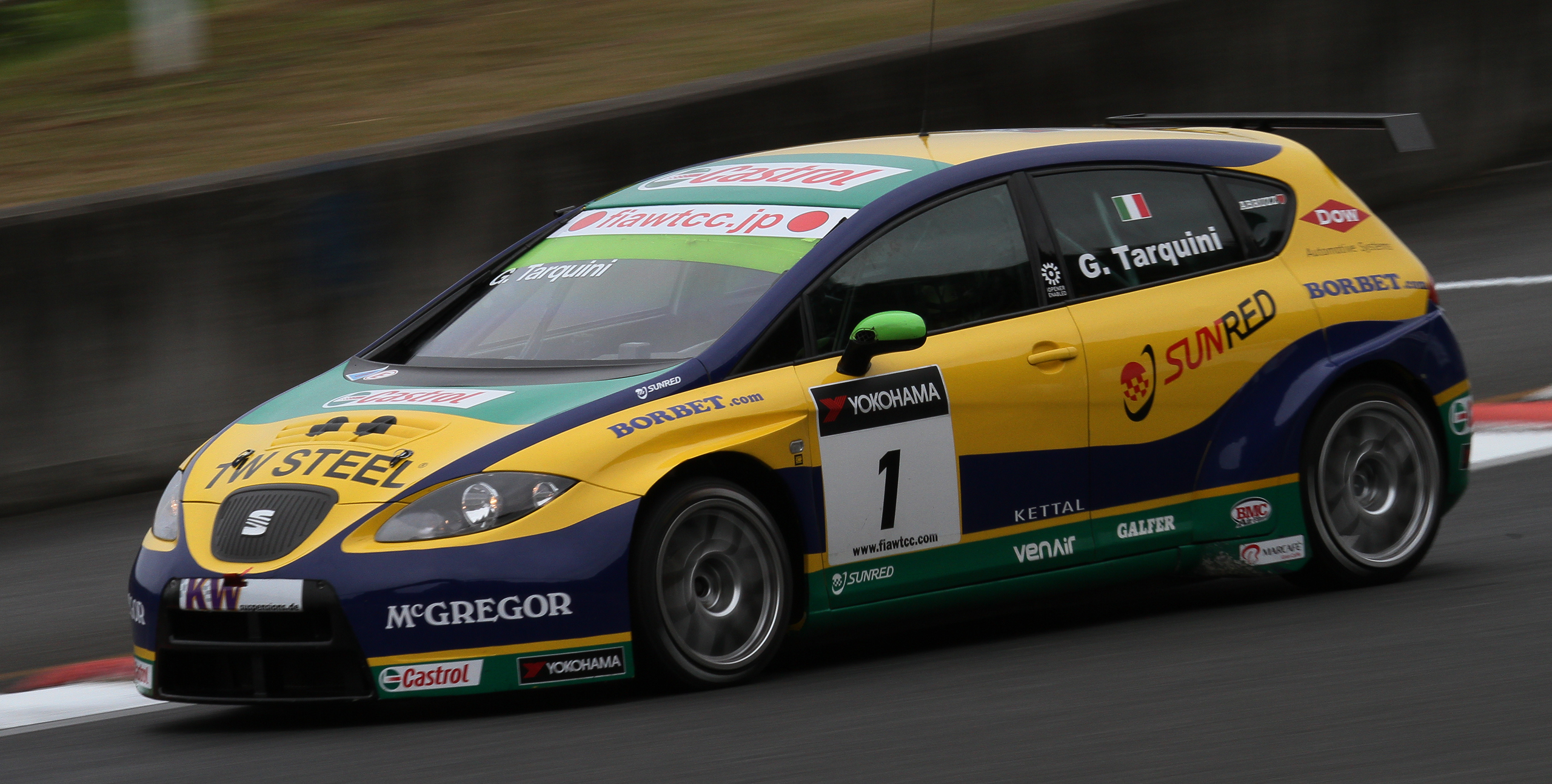
Gabriele Tarquini (SEAT León) placed second in the Drivers Championship

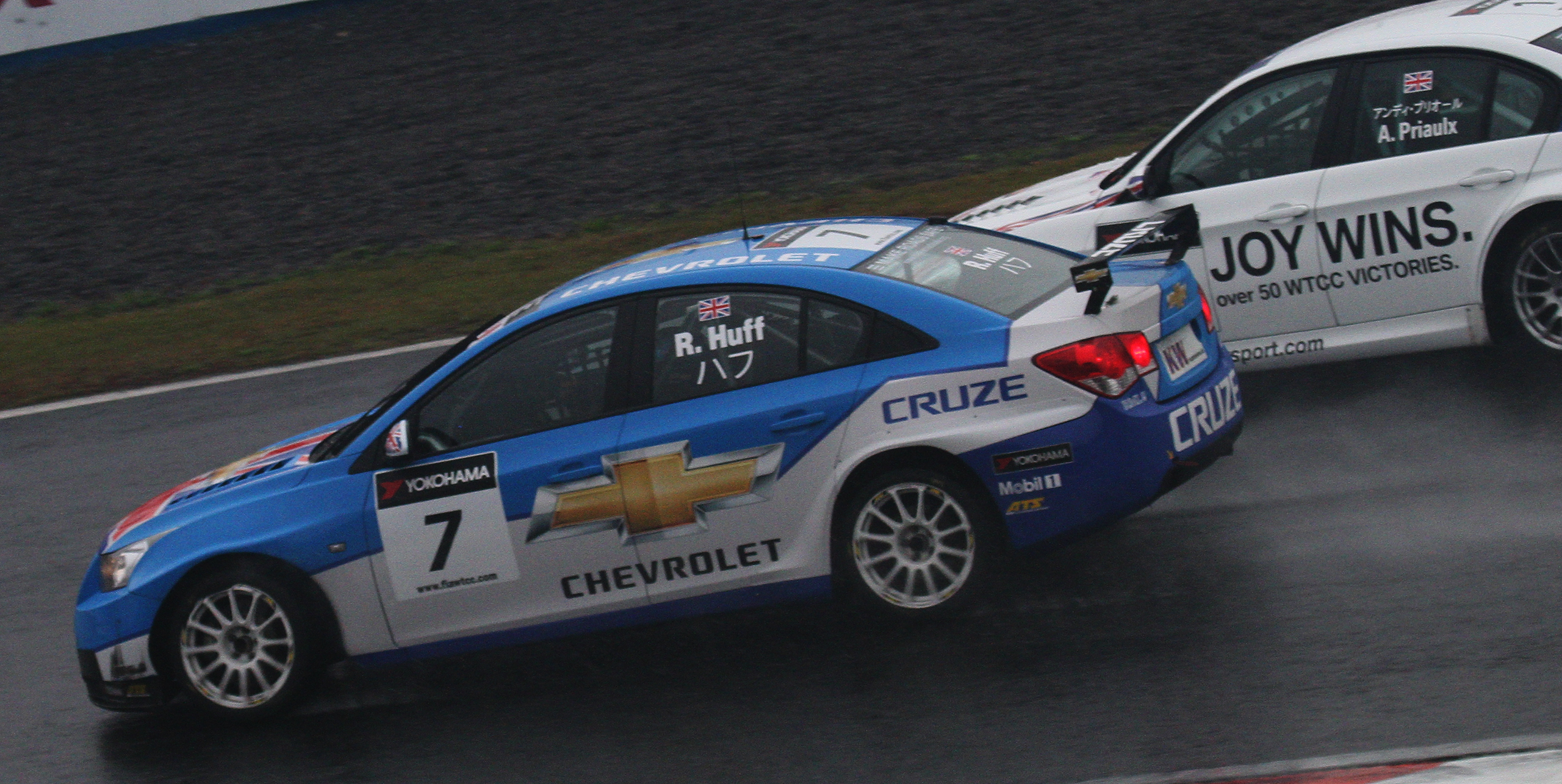
Robert Huff (Chevrolet Cruze) placed third in the Drivers Championship

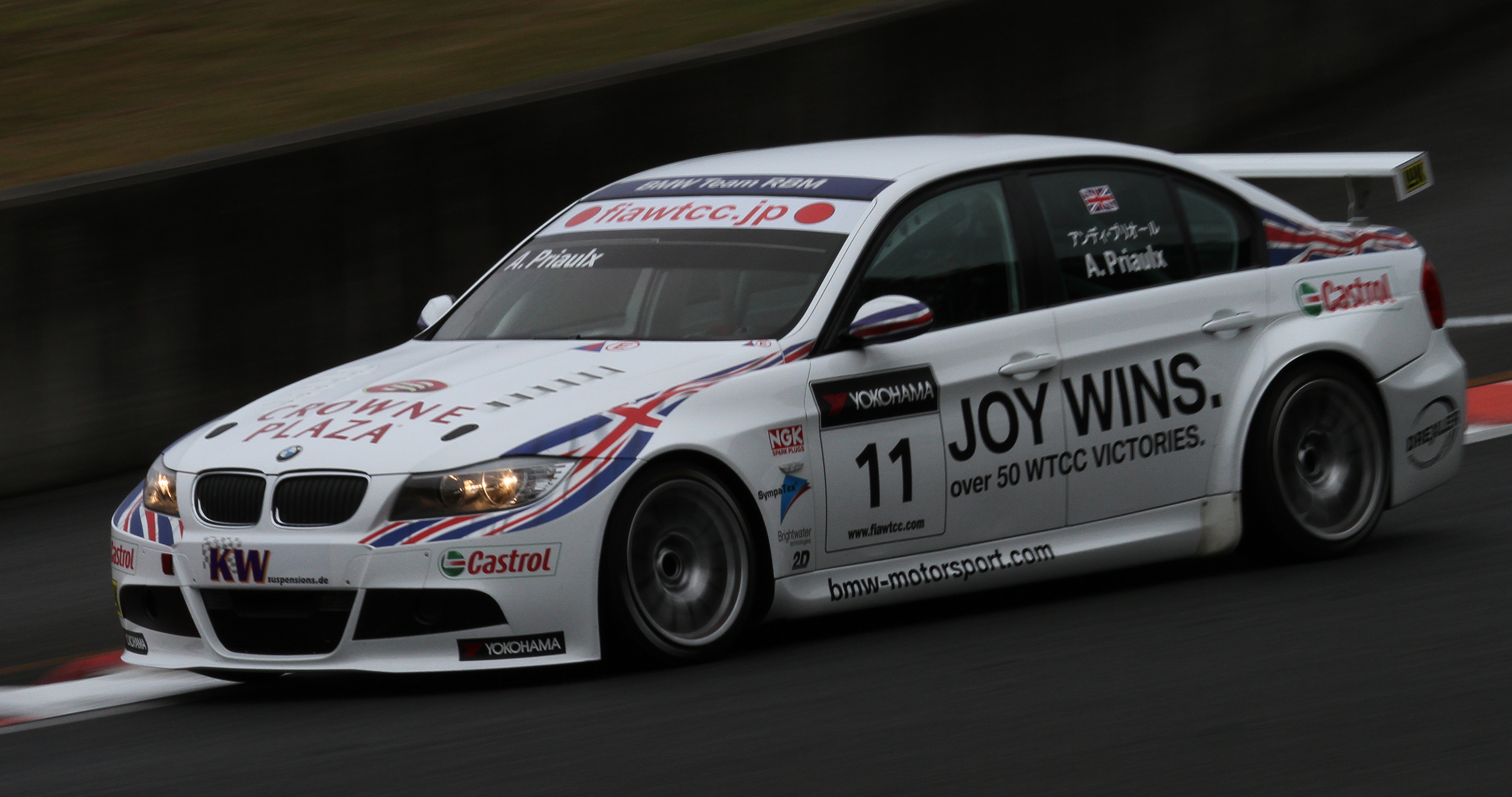
Andy Priaulx (BMW 320si) placed fourth in the Drivers Championship

The full season entry list was released on 19 February 2010.

Team	Car	No.	Drivers	Events
Manufacturer Teams
(Spain) SR-Sport	SEAT León 2.0 TDI	1	(Italy) Gabriele Tarquini	All
(Spain) SR-Sport	SEAT León 2.0 TDI	2	(Netherlands) Tom Coronel	All
(Spain) SR-Sport	SEAT León 2.0 TDI	3	(Portugal) Tiago Monteiro	All
(Spain) SR-Sport	SEAT León 2.0 TDI	4	(Spain) Jordi Gené	1–9
(Spain) SR-Sport	SEAT León 2.0 TDI	66	(Macau) André Couto	11
(Spain) SR-Sport	SEAT León 2.0 TDI	73	(France) Michaël Rossi	10
(Spain) SUNRED Engineering	SEAT León 2.0 TDI	17	(Denmark) Michel Nykjær	All
(Switzerland) SEAT Swiss Racing by SUNRED	SEAT León 2.0 TDI	18	(Switzerland) Fredy Barth	All
(Hungary) Zengő-Dension Team	SEAT León 2.0 TDI	5	(Hungary) Norbert Michelisz	All
(United Kingdom) Chevrolet RML	Chevrolet Cruze LT	6	(France) Yvan Muller	All
(United Kingdom) Chevrolet RML	Chevrolet Cruze LT	7	(United Kingdom) Robert Huff	All
(United Kingdom) Chevrolet RML	Chevrolet Cruze LT	8	(Switzerland) Alain Menu	All
(United Kingdom) Chevrolet RML	Chevrolet Cruze LT	9	(Brazil) Carlos "Cacá" Bueno	6
(United Kingdom) Chevrolet RML	Chevrolet Cruze LT	35	(Belgium) Vincent Radermecker	4
(Belgium) BMW Team RBM	BMW 320si	10	(Brazil) Augusto Farfus	All
(Belgium) BMW Team RBM	BMW 320si	11	(United Kingdom) Andy Priaulx	All
(United Kingdom) eBay Motors	BMW 320si	29	(United Kingdom) Colin Turkington	7
(United Kingdom) Team Aviva-COFCO	BMW 320si	29	(United Kingdom) Colin Turkington	10–11
Chevrolet Motorsport Sweden	Chevrolet Cruze LT	34	(Argentina) Leonel Pernía	3
Yokohama Trophy
(Germany) Liqui Moly Team Engstler	BMW 320si	15	(Germany) Franz Engstler	All
(Germany) Liqui Moly Team Engstler	BMW 320si	16	(Russia) Andrey Romanov	1–5, 7–11
(Germany) Liqui Moly Team Engstler	BMW 320si	42	(Netherlands) Tim Coronel	6
(Hong Kong) bamboo-engineering	Chevrolet Lacetti	19	(United Kingdom) Harry Vaulkhard	1–7
(Hong Kong) bamboo-engineering	Chevrolet Lacetti	20	(Hong Kong) Darryl O'Young	All
(Hong Kong) bamboo-engineering	Chevrolet Lacetti	72	(Japan) Yukinori Taniguchi	8–11
(Germany) Wiechers-Sport	BMW 320si	21	(Morocco) Mehdi Bennani	All
(Denmark) Poulsen Motorsport	BMW 320si	24	(Denmark) Kristian Poulsen	3–11
(Italy) Scuderia Proteam Motorsport	BMW 320si	25	(Spain) Sergio Hernández	All
(Italy) Scuderia Proteam Motorsport	BMW 320si	26	(Italy) Stefano D'Aste	1–10
(Italy) Scuderia Proteam Motorsport	BMW 320si	33	(Italy) Fabio Fabiani	3, 7–8
(France) Exagon Engineering	SEAT León	27	(Belgium) Pierre-Yves Corthals	4
(United Kingdom) eBay Motors	BMW 320si	29	(United Kingdom) Colin Turkington	5–6
(Switzerland) Maurer Motorsport	Chevrolet Lacetti	30	(Morocco) Ismaïl Sbaï	2
(Switzerland) Maurer Motorsport	Chevrolet Lacetti	31	(Morocco) Youssaf El Marnissi	2
(Spain) SUNRED Engineering	SEAT León	38	(United Kingdom) Tom Boardman	6
(Spain) SEAT Customers Technology	SEAT León	39	(Spain) Marc Carol	9
Asian Wild Card Entries
(Italy) Scuderia Proteam Motorsport	BMW 320si	43	(Japan) Nobuteru Taniguchi	10–11
(Italy) Scuderia Proteam Motorsport	BMW 320si	45	(Taiwan) Kevin Chen	10–11
(Germany) Liqui Moly Team Engstler	BMW 320si	44	(Japan) Yoshihiro Ito	10
(Germany) Liqui Moly Team Engstler	BMW 320si	47	(Japan) Masaki Kano	11
(Germany) Liqui Moly Team Engstler	BMW 320si	50	(Macau) Jo Merszei	11
(Germany) Wiechers-Sport	BMW 320si	46	(Japan) Masataka Yanagida	10
(Macau) Ho Chun Kei / Sports & You Asia	BMW 320si	51	(Macau) Henry Ho	10–11
(Hong Kong) Jacob & Co Racing	Honda Accord Euro R	53	(Hong Kong) Philip Ma	11
(Portugal) Team Novadriver Total	BMW 320si	63	(Portugal) César Campaniço	11
(Macau) Andy Racing Team	Honda Accord Euro R	64	(Macau) Kuok Io Keong	11
(Macau) Chan Kin Man	Honda Civic Type R	65	(Macau) Chan Kin Man	11
Guest Entries
(Sweden) Volvo Olsbergs Green Racing	Volvo C30	41	(Sweden) Robert Dahlgren	6, 10

Key
Eligible for the Rookie Challenge.

=== Team and driver changes ===
Chevrolet replaced the retiring Nicola Larini in their three-car line-up with ex-SEAT Sport driver Yvan Muller. A fourth Chevrolet Cruze was entered in Italy for Leonel Pernía, with Nika Racing running the car under the Chevrolet Motorsport Sweden banner. Vincent Radermecker drove the car for the RML-run squad at the next race in Belgium, with Cacá Bueno driving it in the UK.

BMW Motorsport announced they were reducing their participation from a five-car team to a two-car team, with Augusto Farfus moving from BMW Team Germany to Team RBM to join Andy Priaulx. Former BMW Team Italy-Spain driver Alex Zanardi retired from the series, while former BMW Team Germany driver Jörg Müller raced in the Le Mans Series with Schnitzer.

SEAT Sport withdrew from the series for 2010, but helped Sunred to form a new team SR-Sport, for whom Independents champion Tom Coronel and ex-SEAT Sport drivers Jordi Gené, Tiago Monteiro and Gabriele Tarquini drove for.

Stefano D'Aste returned to Scuderia Proteam Motorsport, for whom he raced in 2005, 2006 and 2008, moving from Wiechers-Sport. His seat was taken by Mehdi Bennani, who moved from Exagon Engineering. D'Aste was joined at Proteam by Sergio Hernández, who returned to Proteam from BMW Team Italy-Spain. Fabio Fabiani raced an additional car for the team at his home event in Italy, just as he did in 2009.

Andrey Romanov rejoined the series and the Liqui Moly Team Engstler setup. He replaced Kristian Poulsen, who raced with his own Poulsen Motorsport team. Romanov could not drive at Brands Hatch for personal reasons, so was replaced by Tim Coronel.

Michel Nykjær joined SUNRED Engineering after racing in the WTCC for Perfection Racing at the 2009 Race of Germany. He replaced Tom Boardman, who returned to the BTCC, driving for Special Tuning (UK). Boardman returned to the WTCC with SUNRED for his home event. Fredy Barth joined the team from the SEAT León Eurocup, racing under the SEAT Swiss Team by SUNRED banner. Zengő Dension Motorsport joined the series, along with their driver, León Eurocup champion Norbert Michelisz, who drove the SUNRED prize car on two occasions – in 2008 and 2009.

British Touring Car team Bamboo Engineering joined the WTCC, along with their driver Harry Vaulkhard. Darryl O'Young, who drove in the FIA GT Championship with Prospeed Competition in 2009, was his teammate for most of this season, before Vaulkhard was forced to withdraw owing to a lack of sponsorship, and was replaced by Yukinori Taniguchi.

James Thompson, who drove for Lada Sport in 2009, was set to race at certain European rounds for Hartmann Racing, in addition to campaigns in the Danish Touring Car Championship and European Touring Car Cup, but left the team, whilst Lada did not return for 2010.

SEAT's Rickard Rydell elected to take a sabbatical from racing for the 2010 season. Instead, he became a TV pundit for Viasat Motor's coverage of the Swedish Touring Car Championship.

Jaap van Lagen returned to the Porsche Supercup, a series in which he finished seventh in 2008.

Without drives for 2010 were Lada's Kirill Ladygin, and Félix Porteiro, who drove for Proteam in 2009.

Maurer Motorsport were set to run three Chevrolet Lacettis at Marrakech for Moroccan racers Ismaïl Sbaï, Youssaf El Marnissi and Larbi Tadlaoui. Tadlaoui did not attend for personal reasons, while El Marnissi crashed in the Friday test session.

Pierre-Yves Corthals made a one-off return to the series with his old team, Exagon Engineering, for his home event in Belgium.

Having been without a drive in any series, 2009 British Touring Car Champion Colin Turkington rejoined the series in Portugal with West Surrey Racing, with backing from eBay Motors.

Swedish championship team Polestar Racing and driver Robert Dahlgren raced once again at Brands Hatch, and also raced in Japan, in a nationally homologated Volvo C30.

== Calendar ==
A provisional calendar for the 2010 season was approved by the FIA World Council on 24 June 2009. The final calendar was published on 21 October 2009. The Race of Mexico at Autódromo Miguel E. Abed, Puebla, scheduled for 11 April, was cancelled in March due to security fears in the region. Series organisers looked for a replacement, but negotiations with interested event promoters did not meet with the championship's logistic and promotional requirements, meaning the season was reduced to eleven events.

Event		Race Name	Track	Date
1	R1	HSBC Race of Brazil	(Brazil) Autódromo Internacional de Curitiba	7 March
1	R2	HSBC Race of Brazil	(Brazil) Autódromo Internacional de Curitiba	7 March
2	R3	Race of Morocco	(Morocco) Marrakech Street Circuit	2 May
2	R4	Race of Morocco	(Morocco) Marrakech Street Circuit	2 May
3	R5	Yokohama Race of Italy	(Italy) Autodromo Nazionale di Monza	23 May
3	R6	Yokohama Race of Italy	(Italy) Autodromo Nazionale di Monza	23 May
4	R7	Monroe Race of Belgium	(Belgium) Circuit Zolder	20 June
4	R8	Monroe Race of Belgium	(Belgium) Circuit Zolder	20 June
5	R9	Race of Turismo de Portugal	(Portugal) Autódromo Internacional do Algarve	4 July
5	R10	Race of Turismo de Portugal	(Portugal) Autódromo Internacional do Algarve	4 July
6	R11	Mariott Race of UK	(United Kingdom) Brands Hatch	18 July
6	R12	Mariott Race of UK	(United Kingdom) Brands Hatch	18 July
7	R13	Monroe Race of the Czech Republic	(Czech Republic) Masaryk Circuit	1 August
7	R14	Monroe Race of the Czech Republic	(Czech Republic) Masaryk Circuit	1 August
8	R15	Race of Germany	(Germany) Motorsport Arena Oschersleben	5 September
8	R16	Race of Germany	(Germany) Motorsport Arena Oschersleben	5 September
9	R17	DHL Race of Spain	(Spain) Circuit Ricardo Tormo	19 September
9	R18	DHL Race of Spain	(Spain) Circuit Ricardo Tormo	19 September
10	R19	Kenwood Race of Japan	(Japan) Okayama International Circuit	31 October
10	R20	Kenwood Race of Japan	(Japan) Okayama International Circuit	31 October
11	R21	Race of Macau	(Macau) Guia Circuit	21 November
11	R22	Race of Macau	(Macau) Guia Circuit	21 November

=== Calendar changes ===
- The Race of Belgium, which replaced the Race of France, was on the calendar for the first time since 2005. This time it was held at Zolder rather than Spa-Francorchamps.
- The Race of Portugal was moved to the Autódromo Internacional do Algarve.
- The venue for the Race of Italy was changed from the Autodromo Enzo e Dino Ferrari near Imola back to the Autodromo Nazionale di Monza, which hosted the race from 2005 until 2008.

== Results and standings ==
=== Races ===
Race	Race Name	Pole Position	Fastest lap	Winning driver	Winning team	Winning independent	Report
1	Race of Brazil	(France) Yvan Muller	(United Kingdom) Robert Huff	(France) Yvan Muller	(United States) Chevrolet	(Spain) Sergio Hernández	Report
2	Race of Brazil		(Italy) Gabriele Tarquini	(Italy) Gabriele Tarquini	(Spain) SR-Sport	(Spain) Sergio Hernández	Report
3	Race of Morocco	(Italy) Gabriele Tarquini	(Switzerland) Fredy Barth	(Italy) Gabriele Tarquini	(Spain) SR-Sport	(Germany) Franz Engstler	Report
4	Race of Morocco		(Spain) Jordi Gené	(United Kingdom) Andy Priaulx	(Belgium) BMW Team RBM	(Morocco) Mehdi Bennani	Report
5	Race of Italy	(Brazil) Augusto Farfus	(Italy) Gabriele Tarquini	(United Kingdom) Andy Priaulx	(Belgium) BMW Team RBM	(United Kingdom) Harry Vaulkhard	Report
6	Race of Italy		(United Kingdom) Andy Priaulx	(France) Yvan Muller	(United States) Chevrolet	(Italy) Stefano D'Aste	Report
7	Race of Belgium	(Italy) Gabriele Tarquini	(United Kingdom) Andy Priaulx	(Italy) Gabriele Tarquini	(Spain) SR-Sport	(Denmark) Kristian Poulsen	Report
8	Race of Belgium		(United Kingdom) Andy Priaulx	(United Kingdom) Andy Priaulx	(Belgium) BMW Team RBM	(Spain) Sergio Hernández	Report
9	Race of Portugal	(Portugal) Tiago Monteiro	(Italy) Gabriele Tarquini	(Portugal) Tiago Monteiro	(Spain) SR-Sport	(Spain) Sergio Hernández	Report
10	Race of Portugal		(Spain) Jordi Gené	(Italy) Gabriele Tarquini	(Spain) SR-Sport	(Hong Kong) Darryl O'Young	Report
11	(United Kingdom) Race of UK	(France) Yvan Muller	(United Kingdom) Andy Priaulx	(France) Yvan Muller	(United States) Chevrolet	(United Kingdom) Colin Turkington	Report
12	(United Kingdom) Race of UK		(United Kingdom) Andy Priaulx	(United Kingdom) Andy Priaulx	(Belgium) BMW Team RBM	(United Kingdom) Colin Turkington	Report
13	Race of the Czech Republic	(United Kingdom) Robert Huff	(Brazil) Augusto Farfus	(United Kingdom) Robert Huff	(United States) Chevrolet	(Denmark) Kristian Poulsen	Report
14	Race of the Czech Republic		(Italy) Gabriele Tarquini	(United Kingdom) Andy Priaulx	(Belgium) BMW Team RBM	(Hong Kong) Darryl O'Young	Report
15	Race of Germany	(Brazil) Augusto Farfus	(Switzerland) Alain Menu	(Switzerland) Alain Menu	(United States) Chevrolet	(Denmark) Kristian Poulsen	Report
16	Race of Germany		(Italy) Gabriele Tarquini	(United Kingdom) Andy Priaulx	(Belgium) BMW Team RBM	(Denmark) Kristian Poulsen	Report
17	Race of Spain	(Italy) Gabriele Tarquini	(Italy) Gabriele Tarquini	(Italy) Gabriele Tarquini	(Spain) SR-Sport	(Denmark) Kristian Poulsen	Report
18	Race of Spain		(Portugal) Tiago Monteiro	(Portugal) Tiago Monteiro	(Spain) SR-Sport	(Denmark) Kristian Poulsen	Report
19	Race of Japan	(United Kingdom) Andy Priaulx	(France) Yvan Muller	(United Kingdom) Robert Huff	(United States) Chevrolet	(Japan) Yukinori Taniguchi	Report
20	Race of Japan		(Denmark) Michel Nykjær	(United Kingdom) Colin Turkington	(United Kingdom) Team Aviva-COFCO	(Hong Kong) Darryl O'Young	Report
21	Guia Race of Macau	(United Kingdom) Robert Huff	(United Kingdom) Robert Huff	(United Kingdom) Robert Huff	(United States) Chevrolet	(Denmark) Kristian Poulsen	Report
22	Guia Race of Macau		(United Kingdom) Robert Huff	(Hungary) Norbert Michelisz	(Hungary) Zengő-Dension Team	(Spain) Sergio Hernández	Report

== Championship standings ==
Points system
**1st**	**2nd**	**3rd**	**4th**	**5th**	**6th**	**7th**	**8th**	**9th**	**10th**
25	18	15	12	10	8	6	4	2	1

=== Drivers' Championship ===
Pos	Driver	BRA (Brazil)		MAR (Morocco)		ITA (Italy)		BEL (Belgium)		POR (Portugal)		UK (United Kingdom)		CZE (Czech Republic)		GER (Germany)		ESP (Spain)		JPN (Japan)		MAC (Macau)		Pts
1	(France) Yvan Muller	**1**	4	6	2	4	1	2	5	2	2	**1**	5	NC	12	3	3	2	2	2	2	2	4	**331**
2	(Italy) Gabriele Tarquini	4	1	**1**	6	7	20†	**1**	6	3	1	4	3	2	18†	Ret	9	**1**	3	5	Ret	4	2	**276**
3	(United Kingdom) Robert Huff	2	5	2	Ret	3	3	5	2	18	15	2	6	**1**	4	18†	7	3	6	1	3	**1**	3	**276**
4	(United Kingdom) Andy Priaulx	5	Ret	8	**1**	1	5	7	**1**	Ret	4	7	**1**	5	1	5	1	5	4	**DSQ**	DSQ	NC	7	**246**
5	(Portugal) Tiago Monteiro	11	7	3	4	9	7	4	3	**1**	7	8	Ret	9	6	4	18	6	1	Ret	Ret	3	8	**177**
6	(Switzerland) Alain Menu	3	3	9	Ret	17	9	3	4	5	3	22	NC	3	3	1	8	8	**11**	7	4	7	Ret	**173**
7	(Brazil) Augusto Farfus	6	6	10	Ret	**2**	4	9	8	4	5	6	8	4	5	**2**	2	18	8	DSQ	DSQ	6	5	**167**
8	(Netherlands) Tom Coronel	8	**Ret**	5	3	5	2	8	10	6	6	5	4	Ret	10	6	5	10	9	14	8	12	6	**136**
9	(Hungary) Norbert Michelisz	10	9	7	10	19†	8	6	7	7	Ret	9	7	Ret	14	8	**11**	11	12	3	7	5	1	**104**
10	(United Kingdom) Colin Turkington									12	10	3	2	6	2					4	1	Ret	13	**97**
11	(Denmark) Michel Nykjær	12	8	11	7	8	**19**†	18	Ret	17	Ret	15	9	7	Ret	7	4	9	7	6	6	Ret	11	**66**
12	(Spain) Jordi Gené	7	2	13	8	16	6	DSQ	Ret	Ret	18†	10	10	Ret	13	12	10	4	5					**61**
13	(Switzerland) Fredy Barth	9	14	4	5	6	14	10	18	8	**8**	11	Ret	12	8	11	20	7	Ret	Ret	13	Ret	Ret	**51**
14	(Denmark) Kristian Poulsen					Ret	15	11	11	11	Ret	23	Ret	8	19†	9	6	12	10	15	11	8	**Ret**	**20**
15	(Hong Kong) Darryl O'Young	15	16	17	13	Ret	12	20	12	10	9	21	Ret	17	**7**	NC	12	14	17	10	9	Ret	Ret	**15**
16	(Spain) Sergio Hernández	13	10	14	Ret	12	16	13	9	9	17	16	12	11	11	10	13	19	15	11	Ret	11	9	**9**
17	(Germany) Franz Engstler	14	11	12	12	Ret	DNS	Ret	16	13	14	14	13	13	Ret	13	15	15	14	13	10	9	10	**5**
18	(Japan) Yukinori Taniguchi															17	14	17	18	9	16	13	Ret	**4**
19	(Italy) Stefano D'Aste	17	15	Ret	11	11	11	16	13	14	13	18	11	10	9	15	16	Ret	DNS	Ret	17			**3**
20	(Morocco) Mehdi Bennani	18	12	15	9	14	17	14	19†	Ret	12	19	Ret	14	16	14	Ret	Ret	16	16	19	10	12	**3**
21	(United Kingdom) Harry Vaulkhard	16	13	16	Ret	10	13	15	Ret	15	11	17	14	15	15									**1**
22	(Argentina) Leonel Pernía					18†	10																	**1**
	(Belgium) Pierre-Yves Corthals							12	15															**0**
	(Japan) Nobuteru Taniguchi																			12	18	16	Ret	**0**
	(France) Michaël Rossi																			Ret	12			**0**
	(Spain) Marc Carol																	13	13					**0**
	(Russia) Andrey Romanov	Ret	DNS	Ret	DNS	13	Ret	19	17	16	16			16	17	16	17	16	19	Ret	15	15	Ret	**0**
	(United Kingdom) Tom Boardman											13	Ret											**0**
	(Portugal) César Campaniço																					14	16†	**0**
	(Taiwan) Kevin Chen																			Ret	20	17	14	**0**
	(Belgium) Vincent Radermecker							17	14															**0**
	(Japan) Masataka Yanagida																			17	14			**0**
	(Italy) Fabio Fabiani					15	18							18	20†	NC	19							**0**
	(Hong Kong) Philip Ma																					18	15	**0**
	(Netherlands) Tim Coronel											20	15											**0**
	(Macau) Henry Ho																			18	21†	21†	DNS	**0**
	(Japan) Yoshihiro Ito																			19	Ret			**0**
	(Macau) Jo Merszei																					19	Ret	**0**
	(Japan) Masaki Kano																					20	Ret	**0**
	(Morocco) Ismaïl Sbaï			Ret	DNS																			**0**
	(Brazil) Carlos "Cacá" Bueno											Ret	DNS											**0**
	(Macau) André Couto																					Ret	DNS	**0**
	(Morocco) Youssaf El Marnissi			DNS	DNS																			**0**
	(Macau) Kuok Io Keong																					EX	EX	**0**
	(Macau) Chan Kin Man																					EX	EX	**0**
guest drivers ineligible for points
–	(Sweden) Robert Dahlgren											12	Ret							8	5			*
Pos	Driver	BRA (Brazil)		MAR (Morocco)		ITA (Italy)		BEL (Belgium)		POR (Portugal)		UK (United Kingdom)		CZE (Czech Republic)		GER (Germany)		ESP (Spain)		JPN (Japan)		MAC (Macau)		Pts

Colour	Result
Gold	Winner
Silver	Second place
Bronze	Third place
Green	Points classification
Blue	Non-points classification
Blue	Non-classified finish (NC)
Purple	Retired, not classified (Ret)
Red	Did not qualify (DNQ)
Red	Did not pre-qualify (DNPQ)
Black	Disqualified (DSQ)
White	Did not start (DNS)
White	Withdrew (WD)
White	Race cancelled (C)
Blank	Did not practice (DNP)
Blank	Did not arrive (DNA)
Blank	Excluded (EX)

**Bold** – Pole
Italics – Fastest Lap

† — Drivers did not finish the race, but were classified as they completed over 90% of the race distance.

=== Manufacturers' Championship ===
The Manufacturers’ title was awarded to the highest scoring manufacturer, taking into account the results obtained by the two best placed cars per manufacturer at each race. All other cars of that same manufacturer were considered invisible as far as scoring points was concerned.

Pos	Manufacturer	BRA (Brazil)		MAR (Morocco)		ITA (Italy)		BEL (Belgium)		POR (Portugal)		UK (United Kingdom)		CZE (Czech Republic)		GER (Germany)		ESP (Spain)		JPN (Japan)		MAC (Macau)		Pts
1	(United States) Chevrolet	1	3	2	2	3	1	2	2	2	2	1	5	1	3	1	3	2	2	1	2	1	3	715
1	(United States) Chevrolet	2	4	6	13	4	3	3	4	5	3	2	6	3	4	3	7	3	6	2	3	2	4	715
2	(Spain) SEAT	4	1	1	3	5	2	1	3	1	1	4	3	2	6	4	4	1	1	3	6	3	1	641
2	(Spain) SEAT	7	2	3	4	6	6	4	6	3	6	5	4	7	8	6	5	4	3	5	7	4	2	641
3	(Germany) BMW	5	6	8	1	1	4	7	1	4	4	3	1	4	1	2	1	5	4	4	1	6	5	580
3	(Germany) BMW	6	10	10	9	2	5	9	8	9	5	6	2	5	2	5	2	12	8	10	10	8	7	580
Pos	Manufacturer	BRA (Brazil)		MAR (Morocco)		ITA (Italy)		BEL (Belgium)		POR (Portugal)		UK (United Kingdom)		CZE (Czech Republic)		GER (Germany)		ESP (Spain)		JPN (Japan)		MAC (Macau)		Pts

=== Yokohama Independents' Trophy ===
Eligibility for the award was determined by championship promoter KSO, taking into account the team's record, the driver's record and the car's technical characteristics.

Pos	Driver	BRA (Brazil)		MAR (Morocco)		ITA (Italy)		BEL (Belgium)		POR (Portugal)		UK (United Kingdom)		CZE (Czech Republic)		GER (Germany)		ESP (Spain)		JPN (Japan)		MAC (Macau)		Pts
1	(Spain) Sergio Hernández	13	**10**	14	Ret	12	16	13	9	9	**17**	16	12	11	11	10	13	19	15	11	Ret	11	9	156
2	(Germany) Franz Engstler	14	11	**12**	**12**	Ret	DNS	Ret	16	13	14	14	13	13	Ret	13	15	15	14	**13**	10	9	10	127
3	(Denmark) Kristian Poulsen					Ret	15	11	**11**	11	Ret	23	Ret	8	19	9	**6**	**12**	**10**	15	11	8	**Ret**	117
4	(Hong Kong) Darryl O'Young	15	16	17	13	**Ret**	12	20	12	10	9	21	Ret	17	**7**	NC	12	14	17	10	9	**Ret**	Ret	104
5	(Morocco) Mehdi Bennani	18	12	15	9	14	17	14	19	Ret	12	19	Ret	14	16	14	Ret	Ret	16	16	19	10	12	91
6	(Italy) Stefano D'Aste	**17**	15	Ret	11	11	11	16	13	14	13	18	11	10	9	**15**	16	Ret	DNS	Ret	17			88
7	(United Kingdom) Colin Turkington									**12**	10	**3**	**2**	**P**^{1}										73
8	(United Kingdom) Harry Vaulkhard	16	13	16	Ret	10	**13**	15	Ret	15	11	17	14	15	15									61
9	(Russia) Andrey Romanov	Ret	DNS	Ret	DNS	13	Ret	19	17	16	16			16	17	16	17	16	19	NC	15	15	Ret	35
10	(Japan) Yukinori Taniguchi															17	14	16	18	9	**16**	13	Ret	33
11	(Spain) Marc Carol																	13	13					16
12	(Belgium) Pierre-Yves Corthals							**12**	15															13
13	(Portugal) César Campaniço																					14	16	12
14	(Taiwan) Kevin Chen																			Ret	20	17	14	10
15	(United Kingdom) Tom Boardman											13	Ret											8
16	(Hong Kong) Philip Ma																					18	15	8
17	(Japan) Nobuteru Taniguchi																			12	18	16	Ret	8
18	(Italy) Fabio Fabiani					15	18							18	20	NC	19							7
19	(Japan) Masataka Yanagida																			17	14			6
20	(Netherlands) Tim Coronel											20	15											4
	(Macau) Henry Ho																			18	21	21	DNS	0
	(Japan) Yoshihiro Ito																			19	Ret			0
	(Macau) Jo Merszei																					19	Ret	0
	(Japan) Masaki Kano																					20	Ret	0
	(Morocco) Ismaïl Sbaï			Ret	DNS																			0
	(Morocco) Youssaf El Marnissi			DNS	DNS																			0
	(Macau) Kuok Io Keong																					EX	EX	0
	(Macau) Chan Kin Man																					EX	EX	0
Pos	Driver	BRA (Brazil)		MAR (Morocco)		ITA (Italy)		BEL (Belgium)		POR (Portugal)		UK (United Kingdom)		CZE (Czech Republic)		GER (Germany)		ESP (Spain)		JPN (Japan)		MAC (Macau)		Pts

1. – After taking pole position at Brno, Colin Turkington was stripped of his independent status. Another change made at Brno was the removal of extra points to the championship, if the driver finished in the overall top ten, after Turkington claimed 33 bonus points at Brands Hatch.

=== Yokohama Teams' Trophy ===
All teams were eligible to compete for the award, however points were only awarded to the two best placed cars of each team, providing they were driven by Independent drivers. Any other cars of that same team were considered to be invisible as far as scoring points was concerned.

Pos	Team	BRA (Brazil)		MAR (Morocco)		ITA (Italy)		BEL (Belgium)		POR (Portugal)		UK (United Kingdom)		CZE (Czech Republic)		GER (Germany)		ESP (Spain)		JPN (Japan)		MAC (Macau)		Pts
1	(Italy) Scuderia Proteam Motorsport	13	10	14	11	11	11	13	9	9	13	16	11	10	9	10	13	19	15	11	17	11	9	248
1	(Italy) Scuderia Proteam Motorsport	17	15	Ret	Ret	12	16	16	13	14	17	18	12	11	11	15	16	Ret	DNS	12	18	16	14	248
2	(United Kingdom) bamboo-engineering	15	13	16	13	10	12	15	12	10	9	17	14	15	7	17	12	14	17	9	9	13	Ret	189
2	(United Kingdom) bamboo-engineering	16	16	17	Ret	Ret	13	20	Ret	15	11	21	Ret	17	15	NC	14	17	18	10	16	Ret	Ret	189
3	(Germany) Liqui Moly Team Engstler	14	11	12	12	13	Ret	19	16	13	14	14	13	13	17	13	15	15	14	13	10	9	10	162
3	(Germany) Liqui Moly Team Engstler	Ret	DNS	Ret	DNS	Ret	DNS	Ret	17	16	16	20	15	16	Ret	16	17	16	19	19	15	15	Ret	162
4	(Denmark) Poulsen Motorsport					Ret	15	11	11	11	Ret	23	Ret	8	19	9	6	12	10	15	11	8	Ret	110
5	(Germany) Wiechers-Sport	18	12	15	9	14	17	14	19	Ret	12	19	Ret	14	16	14	Ret	Ret	16	16	14	10	12	94
5	(Germany) Wiechers-Sport																			17	19			94
6	(United Kingdom) eBay Motors									12	10	3	2											33
7	(Spain) SEAT Customers Technology																	13	13					16
8	(France) Exagon Engineering							12	15															12
9	(Portugal) Team Novadriver Total																					14	16	12
10	(Spain) SUNRED Engineering											13	Ret											8
11	(Hong Kong) Jacob & Co Racing																					18	15	8
	(Macau) Ho Chun Kei / Sports & You Asia																			18	21	21	DNS	0
	(Switzerland) Maurer Motorsport			Ret	DNS																			0
	(Switzerland) Maurer Motorsport			DNS	DNS																			0
	(Macau) Andy Racing Team																					EX	EX	0
	(Macau) Chan Kin Man																					EX	EX	0
Pos	Team	BRA (Brazil)		MAR (Morocco)		ITA (Italy)		BEL (Belgium)		POR (Portugal)		UK (United Kingdom)		CZE (Czech Republic)		GER (Germany)		ESP (Spain)		JPN (Japan)		MAC (Macau)		Pts

=== WTCC Rookie Challenge ===
Any driver who had not previously completed a full season in the championship was eligible to score points in the Rookie Challenge. Points were awarded on a 10-8-6-5-4-3-2-1 basis to the first eight finishers in the class in each race.

Pos	Driver	BRA (Brazil)		MAR (Morocco)		ITA (Italy)		BEL (Belgium)		POR (Portugal)		UK (United Kingdom)		CZE (Czech Republic)		GER (Germany)		ESP (Spain)		JPN (Japan)		MAC (Macau)		Pts
1	(Hungary) Norbert Michelisz	10	9	8	10	19	8	6	7	7	Ret	9	7	Ret	14	8	11	11	12	3	7	5	1	167
2	(Denmark) Michel Nykjær	12	8	11	7	8	19	18	Ret	17	Ret	15	9	7	Ret	7	4	9	7	6	6	Ret	11	137
3	(Switzerland) Fredy Barth	9	14	4	5	6	14	10	18	8	8	11	Ret	12	8	11	20	7	Ret	Ret	13	Ret	Ret	130
4	(Hong Kong) Darryl O'Young	15	16	16	13	Ret	12	20	12	10	9	21	Ret	17	7	NC	12	14	17	10	9	Ret	Ret	94
5	(Morocco) Mehdi Bennani	18	12	15	9	14	17	14	19	Ret	12	19	Ret	14	16	14	Ret	Ret	16	16	19	10	12	94
6	(United Kingdom) Harry Vaulkhard	16	13	16	Ret	10	13	15	Ret	15	11	17	14	15	15									61
Pos	Driver	BRA (Brazil)		MAR (Morocco)		ITA (Italy)		BEL (Belgium)		POR (Portugal)		UK (United Kingdom)		CZE (Czech Republic)		GER (Germany)		ESP (Spain)		JPN (Japan)		MAC (Macau)		Pts
