= Youssaf El Marnissi =

Moroccan racing driver

- Nationality: (Morocco) Moroccan
- Born: February 2, 1976 (age 50) Al Hoceima (Morocco)

World Touring Car Championship career
- Debut season: 2010
- Current team: Maurer Motorsport
- Car number: 31
- Starts: 0
- Wins: 0
- Poles: 0
- Fastest laps: 0

Previous series
- 2007–09: Moroccan Circuit Racing

Youssaf El Marnissi (born February 2, 1976, in Al Hoceima) is a Moroccan racing driver.

== Career ==
El Marnissi competed in the Moroccan Circuit Racing Championship between 2007 and 2009.

El Marnissi, along with compatriots Ismaïl Sbaï and Larbi Tadlaoui, was due to compete in the 2010 FIA WTCC Race of Morocco, his home round of the World Touring Car Championship, driving a Chevrolet Lacetti for Maurer Motorsport. However, El Marnissi crashed during the Friday testing session at the track and received damage that was not possible for his team to fix before the races on Sunday. He participated with Ismail Sbail and larbi tadlaoui at the Trofeo Maserati in 2012 and earned a place on the podium at the meeting of 20 May in its first appearance, a 3rd place for the Moroccan.

- 2013: He participated in the Eurocup clio at 2013 and his best result was 14th at the races of Aragon. He finished 33rd in the championship with bad equipment.
- 2014: He finished 3rd at the Moroccan championship M2 division, participating in the half of the races.
