= 2010 FIA WTCC Race of Morocco =

Race details
- Round 2 of 11 in the 2010 World Touring Car Championship at Marrakech Street Circuit in Marrakesh, Morocco.
- Date: 2 May, 2010
- Location: Marrakesh, Morocco
- Course: Marrakech Street Circuit; 4.62 kilometres (2.87 mi)

Race One
- Laps: 13
Pole position
Driver		(Italy) Gabriele Tarquini	SR-Sport
Time		1:45.830	
Podium
First		(Italy) Gabriele Tarquini	SR-Sport
Second		(United Kingdom) Robert Huff	Chevrolet
Third		(Portugal) Tiago Monteiro	SR-Sport
Fastest Lap
Driver		(Switzerland) Fredy Barth	SEAT Swiss Racing by SUNRED
Time		1:46.925	

Race Two
- Laps: 13
Podium
First		(United Kingdom) Andy Priaulx	BMW Team RBM
Second		(France) Yvan Muller	Chevrolet
Third		(Netherlands) Tom Coronel	SR-Sport
Fastest Lap
Driver		(Spain) Jordi Gené	SR-Sport
Time		1:47.894	

The 2010 FIA WTCC Race of Morocco was the second round of the 2010 World Touring Car Championship season and the second running of the FIA WTCC Race of Morocco. It was held at the Marrakech Street Circuit in Marrakesh, Morocco on 2 May 2010. The two races were won by Gabriele Tarquini for SR-Sport and Andy Priaulx for BMW Team RBM, but both races were heavily affected by safety car periods.

== Background ==
After the first round in Brazil, Chevrolet driver Yvan Muller was tied at the top of the drivers' standings with SR-Sport's Tarquini. Scuderia Proteam Motorsport's Sergio Hernández was leading the Yokohama Independents' Trophy.

Swiss team Maurer Motorsport joined the grid for Morocco, running a pair of Chevrolet Lacettis for local drivers Ismaïl Sbaï and Youssaf El Marnissi.

== Report ==
=== Testing and free practice ===
Zengõ-Dension Team driver Norbert Michelisz was fastest in Friday's test session, with SR-Sport driver Tom Coronel second Chevrolet's Robert Huff third. The session was red flagged when Sbaï put his Lacetti into the wall, while Maurer Motorsport teammate El Marnissi stopped with technical problems. Chevrolet factory driver Alain Menu also crashed during the session on the dusty track, hitting a wall and causing considerable damage to his car.

Tarquini topped the first practice session on Saturday morning, ahead of BMW driver Priaulx and SR-Sport teammate Tiago Monteiro. Franz Engstler was the fastest independent driver. Wiechers-Sport's local driver Mehdi Bennani crashed at turn four on his first flying lap.

Tarquini stayed on top in free practice two with Friday pace setter Michelisz second and Chevrolet driver Muller third. Having crashed in the morning session, Bennani was the fastest independent by setting the twelfth fastest time.

=== Qualifying ===
Yvan Muller was the early pacesetter in Q1, before Chevrolet teammate Menu crashed into the wall on the exit of Turn 14, bringing out the red flags. When the session was restarted, SR-Sport driver Tarquini moved to the top of the timesheets, before being demoted by Zengő–Dension Team's Michelisz. However, the Hungarian crashed at Turn 3 after setting his fastest lap, bringing out the red flag again, this time ending the session early. BMW Team RBM drivers Augusto Farfus and Priaulx dropped out of the top ten just before the session was stopped.

Q2 was halted after five minutes due to oil on the track at Turn 2 left by Engstler after the independent BMW driver had hit the wall. After the green flag, Tarquini set a quick time to move into P1. The session was stopped once again when Michel Nykjær crashed at Turn 10. The session did not restart, giving Tarquini pole position ahead of Huff, Jordi Gené, Monteiro, Muller, Nykjær and Coronel. Fredy Barth started eighth, ahead of Engstler and Michelisz. El Marnissi did not participate in qualifying or the races for personal reasons.

=== Warm-Up ===
SR-Sport filled the top three places in Sunday morning warm–up with Coronel setting the fastest time. The highest placed BMW of Farfus was fourth and the quickest Chevrolet of Huff was seventh.

=== Race One ===
It took three attempts at the rolling start for the first race, where all drivers must be lined-up in a two-by-two order before the race director allows the race to start. Once they finally got underway, pole sitter Tarquini led the field through the first chicane. Fellow SEAT driver Nykjær ran wide as he was battling for third position with the SEAT of Gené, resulting in both drivers dropping down the field. The main beneficiary of this was Fredy Barth who moved up from eighth to third in the opening lap. The Swiss driver made a move on second-placed Huff on the second lap, nudging the Chevrolet driver into a slide, which he did well to control and keep his position. Monteiro took advantage to take third from Barth. Further back, Priaulx passed Menu for eighth position and pole position for the second race.

The safety car was deployed halfway through the race after Andrei Romanov crashed his Liqui Moly Team Engstler BMW 320si at Turn 15, and Moroccan local Ismaïl Sbaï appeared to spin his car on his own oil. The marshals struggled to remove the stricken car of Romanov from the circuit and so the safety car remained out for the next ten minutes, until the end of the race, allowing Tarquini to lead Huff and Monteiro to victory. Barth, Tom Coronel, Yvan Muller, Norbert Michelisz, Priaulx, Menu and Augusto Farfus rounded out the top 10.

=== Race Two ===
Pole sitter Priaulx made a good start to Race 2, but drama unfolded behind as fellow front-row starter Michelisz stalled his car. As other cars moved to avoid him, Huff and Barth made contact once again, this time causing Huff to spin into the pit wall. Tarquini also got caught up with the spinning Huff, but got away with minor bodywork damage. Darryl O'Young swerved to avoid Huff's stricken Chevrolet and hit Bamboo Engineering teammate Harry Vaulkhard and then Scuderia Proteam Motorsport driver Hernández. Vaulkhard and Hernández joined Huff in retiring, while O'Young was able to retreat to the pits and rejoin the race after repairing the damage. The safety car was called into action and stayed out until lap seven of 13.

After the restart, Menu attempted to pass Farfus around the outside of Turn 4, but the pair tangled and both veered into the wall on the outside. Farfus limped back to retire in the pits, but the safety car was deployed again to remove the stranded Chevrolet of Menu and clear up the debris from the accident.

The safety car returned to the pits with just one lap of racing to go, with Priaulx fighting hard to keep Muller behind him, resulting in Priaulx brushing the wall at Turn 4. He held on though to win from Muller, Coronel, Monteiro, Barth and Tarquini. Local hero Bennani dropped from seventh to ninth on the final lap, finishing behind Nykjær and Gené. Michelisz recovered from his stall at the start to finish tenth.

== Results ==
=== Qualifying ===
Pos.	No.	Name	Team	Car	C	Q1	Q2
1	1	(Italy) Gabriele Tarquini	SR-Sport	SEAT León 2.0 TDI		1:46.626	1:45.830
2	7	(United Kingdom) Robert Huff	Chevrolet RML	Chevrolet Cruze LT		1:46.662	1:46.364
3	4	(Spain) Jordi Gené	SR-Sport	SEAT León 2.0 TDI		1:46.675	1:46.375
4	3	(Portugal) Tiago Monteiro	SR-Sport	SEAT León 2.0 TDI		1:47.601	1:46.696
5	6	(France) Yvan Muller	Chevrolet RML	Chevrolet Cruze LT		1:46.891	1:46.705
6	17	(Denmark) Michel Nykjær	SUNRED Engineering	SEAT León 2.0 TDI		1:46.942	1:46.751
7	2	(Netherlands) Tom Coronel	SR-Sport	SEAT León 2.0 TDI		1:47.139	1:47.044
8	18	(Switzerland) Fredy Barth	SEAT Swiss Racing by SUNRED	SEAT León 2.0 TDI		1:46.899	1:48.027
9	15	(Germany) Franz Engstler	Liqui Moly Team Engstler	BMW 320si	Y	1:47.541	1:48.994
10	5	(Hungary) Norbert Michelisz	Zengő-Dension Team	SEAT León 2.0 TDI		1:46.437	no time set
11	10	(Brazil) Augusto Farfus	BMW Team RBM	BMW 320si		1:47.616	
12	11	(United Kingdom) Andy Priaulx	BMW Team RBM	BMW 320si		1:47.752	
13	8	(Switzerland) Alain Menu	Chevrolet RML	Chevrolet Cruze LT		1:47.761	
14	26	(Italy) Stefano D'Aste	Scuderia Proteam Motorsport	BMW 320si	Y	1:48.252	
15	25	(Spain) Sergio Hernández	Scuderia Proteam Motorsport	BMW 320si	Y	1:48.556	
16	21	(Morocco) Mehdi Bennani	Wiechers-Sport	BMW 320si	Y	1:48.854	
17	19	(United Kingdom) Harry Vaulkhard	bamboo-engineering	Chevrolet Lacetti	Y	1:49.028	
18	20	(Hong Kong) Darryl O'Young	bamboo-engineering	Chevrolet Lacetti	Y	1:49.313	
19	16	(Russia) Andrei Romanov	Liqui Moly Team Engstler	BMW 320si	Y	1:51.014	
20	30	(Morocco) Ismaïl Sbaï	Maurer Motorsport	Chevrolet Lacetti	Y	1:53.195	
21	31	(Morocco) Youssaf El Marnissi	Maurer Motorsport	Chevrolet Lacetti	Y	no time set	

=== Race 1 ===
Pos.	No.	Name	Team	Car	C	Laps	Time/Retired	Grid	Points
1	1	(Italy) Gabriele Tarquini	SR-Sport	SEAT León 2.0 TDI		13	32:12.815	1	25
2	7	(United Kingdom) Robert Huff	Chevrolet RML	Chevrolet Cruze LT		13	+1.117	2	18
3	3	(Portugal) Tiago Monteiro	SR-Sport	SEAT León 2.0 TDI		13	+1.792	4	15
4	18	(Switzerland) Fredy Barth	SEAT Swiss Racing by SUNRED	SEAT León 2.0 TDI		13	+2.436	8	12
5	2	(Netherlands) Tom Coronel	SR-Sport	SEAT León 2.0 TDI		13	+3.513	7	10
6	6	(France) Yvan Muller	Chevrolet RML	Chevrolet Cruze LT		13	+5.615	5	8
7	5	(Hungary) Norbert Michelisz	Zengő-Dension Team	SEAT León 2.0 TDI		13	+7.900	10	6
8	11	(United Kingdom) Andy Priaulx	BMW Team RBM	BMW 320si		13	+8.892	12	4
9	8	(Switzerland) Alain Menu	Chevrolet RML	Chevrolet Cruze LT		13	+10.113	13	2
10	10	(Brazil) Augusto Farfus	BMW Team RBM	BMW 320si		13	+11.959	11	1
11	17	(Denmark) Michel Nykjær	SUNRED Engineering	SEAT León 2.0 TDI		13	+12.876	6	
12	15	(Germany) Franz Engstler	Liqui Moly Team Engstler	BMW 320si	Y	13	+14.380	9	
13	4	(Spain) Jordi Gené	SR-Sport	SEAT León 2.0 TDI		13	+15.160	3	
14	25	(Spain) Sergio Hernández	Scuderia Proteam Motorsport	BMW 320si	Y	13	+16.347	14	
15	21	(Morocco) Mehdi Bennani	Wiechers-Sport	BMW 320si	Y	13	+16.835	15	
16	19	(United Kingdom) Harry Vaulkhard	bamboo-engineering	Chevrolet Lacetti	Y	13	+18.057	16	
17	20	(Hong Kong) Darryl O'Young	bamboo-engineering	Chevrolet Lacetti	Y	13	+19.737	17	
Ret	30	(Morocco) Ismaïl Sbaï	Maurer Motorsport	Chevrolet Lacetti	Y	8	Race incident	18	
Ret	16	(Russia) Andrei Romanov	Liqui Moly Team Engstler	BMW 320si	Y	6	Race incident	20	
Ret	26	(Italy) Stefano D'Aste	Scuderia Proteam Motorsport	BMW 320si	Y	2	Driveshaft	19	
DNS	31	(Morocco) Youssaf El Marnissi	Maurer Motorsport	Chevrolet Lacetti	Y	0	Did not start	–	

- **Bold** denotes Fastest lap.

=== Race 2 ===
Pos.	No.	Name	Team	Car	C	Laps	Time/Retired	Grid	Points
1	11	(United Kingdom) Andy Priaulx	BMW Team RBM	BMW 320si		13	36:15.763	1	25
2	6	(France) Yvan Muller	Chevrolet RML	Chevrolet Cruze LT		13	+0.837	3	18
3	2	(Netherlands) Tom Coronel	SR-Sport	SEAT León 2.0 TDI		13	+1.228	4	15
4	3	(Portugal) Tiago Monteiro	SR-Sport	SEAT León 2.0 TDI		13	+1.464	6	12
5	18	(Switzerland) Fredy Barth	SEAT Swiss Racing by SUNRED	SEAT León 2.0 TDI		13	+1.949	5	10
6	1	(Italy) Gabriele Tarquini	SR-Sport	SEAT León 2.0 TDI		13	+2.395	8	8
7	17	(Denmark) Michel Nykjær	SUNRED Engineering	SEAT León 2.0 TDI		13	+4.555	11	6
8	4	(Spain) Jordi Gené	SR-Sport	SEAT León 2.0 TDI		13	+5.365	13	4
9	21	(Morocco) Mehdi Bennani	Wiechers-Sport	BMW 320si	Y	13	+5.916	15	2
10	5	(Hungary) Norbert Michelisz	Zengő-Dension Team	SEAT León 2.0 TDI		13	+6.109	2	1
11	26	(Italy) Stefano D'Aste	Scuderia Proteam Motorsport	BMW 320si	Y	13	+8.511	20	
12	15	(Germany) Franz Engstler	Liqui Moly Team Engstler	BMW 320si	Y	13	+8.940	12	
13	20	(Hong Kong) Darryl O'Young	bamboo-engineering	Chevrolet Lacetti	Y	11	+2 Laps	17	
Ret	10	(Brazil) Augusto Farfus	BMW Team RBM	BMW 320si		6	Race incident	10	
Ret	8	(Switzerland) Alain Menu	Chevrolet RML	Chevrolet Cruze LT		6	Race incident	8	
Ret	25	(Spain) Sergio Hernández	Scuderia Proteam Motorsport	BMW 320si	Y	0	Race incident	14	
Ret	19	(United Kingdom) Harry Vaulkhard	bamboo-engineering	Chevrolet Lacetti	Y	0	Race incident	16	
Ret	7	(United Kingdom) Robert Huff	Chevrolet RML	Chevrolet Cruze LT		0	Race incident	7	
DNS	16	(Russia) Andrei Romanov	Liqui Moly Team Engstler	BMW 320si	Y	0	Did not start	19	
DNS	30	(Morocco) Ismaïl Sbaï	Maurer Motorsport	Chevrolet Lacetti	Y	0	Did not start	18	
DNS	31	(Morocco) Youssaf El Marnissi	Maurer Motorsport	Chevrolet Lacetti	Y	0	Did not start	–	

- **Bold** denotes Fastest lap.

== Standings after the event ==
Drivers' Championship standings

	Pos	Driver	Points
1	1	(Italy) Gabriele Tarquini	70
1	2	(France) Yvan Muller	63
1	3	(United Kingdom) Robert Huff	46
3	4	(United Kingdom) Andy Priaulx	39
3	5	(Portugal) Tiago Monteiro	33

Yokohama Independents' Trophy standings

	Pos	Driver	Points
1	1	(Germany) Franz Engstler	34
1	2	(Spain) Sergio Hernández	31
1	3	(Morocco) Mehdi Bennani	27
2	4	(Italy) Stefano D'Aste	18
	5	(Hong Kong) Darryl O'Young	18

Manufacturers' Championship standings

	Pos	Manufacturer	Points
1	1	(Spain) SEAT Customers Technology	133
1	2	(United States) Chevrolet	118
	3	(Germany) BMW	93

- Note: Only the top five positions are included for both sets of drivers' standings.
