= Ismaïl Sbaï =

Moroccan racing driver

Ismail Sbai
- Nationality: (Morocco) Moroccan
- Born: 6 August 1980 (age 46) Tangier (Morocco)

World Touring Car Championship career
- Debut season: 2010
- Current team: Maurer Motorsport
- Car number: 30
- Starts: 1
- Wins: 0
- Poles: 0
- Fastest laps: 0

Previous series
- 2007-09: Moroccan Circuit Racing

Championship titles
- 2008: Moroccan Circuit Racing M1

Ismaïl Sbaï (born 6 August 1980 in Tangier) is a Moroccan racing driver who has competed in the World Touring Car Championship.

== Career ==
Sbaï competed in the Moroccan Circuit Racing Championship between 2007 and 2009, winning the M1 Group in 2008.

Sbaï, along with compatriots Youssaf El Marnissi, competed in the 2010 FIA WTCC Race of Morocco, his home round of the World Touring Car Championship. The duo drove Chevrolet Lacettis for Maurer Motorsport. Sbaï retired from the first race and did not start the second race.
