= Yoshihiro Ito (racing driver) =

Japanese racing driver

Yoshihiro Ito (born 5 June 1977 in Osaka) is a Japanese racing driver.

== Career ==
Ito began his career competing in karting, and since then has competed mainly in single-seater racing in Japan. In 2009, he took part in two races of the Super GT series in a Porsche Boxster. In 2010, he made his World Touring Car Championship debut at the 2010 FIA WTCC Race of Japan at Okayama driving for Liqui Moly Team Engstler.

=== Complete Super GT results ===
Year	Team	Car	Class	1	2	3	4	5	6	7	8	9	DC	Pts
2009	Avanza Rosso	Porsche Boxster	GT300	OKA	SUZ	FUJ	SEP	SUG	SUZ; 14	FUJ	AUT	MOT; Ret	NC	0
