= 2010 FIA WTCC Race of Japan =

Race details
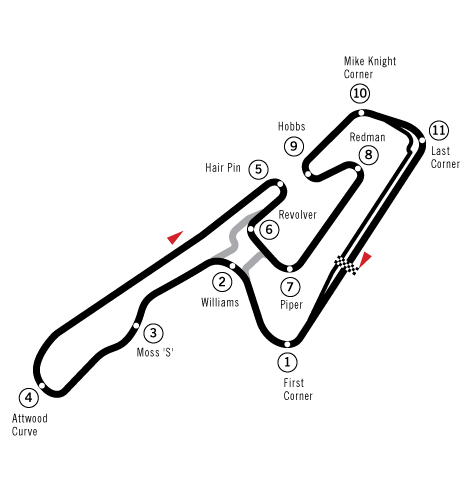
- Round 10 of 11 in the 2010 World Touring Car Championship at Okayama International Circuit in Mimasaka, Japan.
- Date: 31 October, 2010
- Location: Mimasaka, Japan
- Course: Okayama International Circuit; 3.703 kilometres (2.301 mi)

Race One
- Laps: 16
Pole position
Driver		(United Kingdom) Andy Priaulx	BMW Team RBM
Time		1:36.972	
Podium
First		(United Kingdom) Robert Huff	Chevrolet RML
Second		(France) Yvan Muller	Chevrolet RML
Third		(Hungary) Norbert Michelisz	Zengő-Dension Team
Fastest Lap
Driver		(France) Yvan Muller	Chevrolet RML
Time		1:51.813	

Race Two
- Laps: 16
Podium
First		(United Kingdom) Colin Turkington	Team Aviva-COFCO
Second		(France) Yvan Muller	Chevrolet RML
Third		(United Kingdom) Robert Huff	Chevrolet RML
Fastest Lap
Driver		(Denmark) Michel Nykjær	SUNRED Engineering
Time		1:53.478	

The 2010 FIA WTCC Race of Japan (formally the 2010 FIA WTCC Kenwood Race of Japan) was the tenth round of the 2010 World Touring Car Championship season and the third running of the FIA WTCC Race of Japan. It was held at the Okayama International Circuit near Mimasaka, Japan on 31 October 2010. The first race was won by Robert Huff of Chevrolet RML and race two was won by Colin Turkington of Team Aviva-COFCO.

The final results were not released until two weeks later due to an appeal by Chevrolet RML against the use of sequential gearboxes by BMW Team RBM. An FIA investigation found the use of the gearboxes to be illegal and both of the factory BMW drivers were stripped of all points earned at the event, meaning Augusto Farfus was stripped of his race two victory and the win was handed to Turkington. The decision also resulted in Yvan Muller of Chevrolet RML securing his second world drivers' championship, his first with Chevrolet.

== Background ==
After the Race of Spain, Muller was leading the drivers' championship with now only Andy Priaulx, Gabriele Tarquini and Huff able to beat him to the title. Sergio Hernández was leading the Yokohama Independents' Trophy.

SEAT León Eurocup driver Michaël Rossi made his World Touring Car Championship debut with SR-Sport, replacing regular driver Jordi Gené for event. Liqui Moly Team Engstler added a third car for local driver Yoshihiro Ito, joining Franz Engstler and Andrei Romanov. Wiechers-Sport expanded to two cars to run Masataka Yanagida in addition to full-time driver Mehdi Bennani. Scuderia Proteam Motorsport added Japanese racer Nobuteru Taniguchi and Taiwanese driver Kevin Chen. Turkington and West Surrey Racing returned to the championship, now racing under the Team Aviva–COFCO banner for the final two rounds of the season. Volvo Olsbergs Green Racing returned for their second event of the year with Swedish Touring Car Championship runner–up Robert Dahlgren behind the wheel. Macanese driver Henry Ho joined the grid with the Ho Kun Chei / Sports & You Asia team.

== Report ==
=== Testing and free practice ===
Huff and Muller led a Chevrolet 1–2 in the test session on Friday with Alain Menu in fourth separated from his teammates by the BMW of Andy Priaulx. bamboo-engineering's Darryl O'Young in eighth was the fastest independent with returnee Dahlgren in ninth.

Farfus topped the first free practice session on Saturday, half a second ahead of Dahlren's Volvo. Menu was the leading Chevrolet in third with Huff fourth and Norbert Michelisz the fastest SEAT in fifth. Kristian Poulsen was the leading independent runner.

SR–Sport driver Tom Coronel was fastest in free practice two with Huff second and Tiago Monteiro third. Engstler was the top independent driver.

=== Qualifying ===
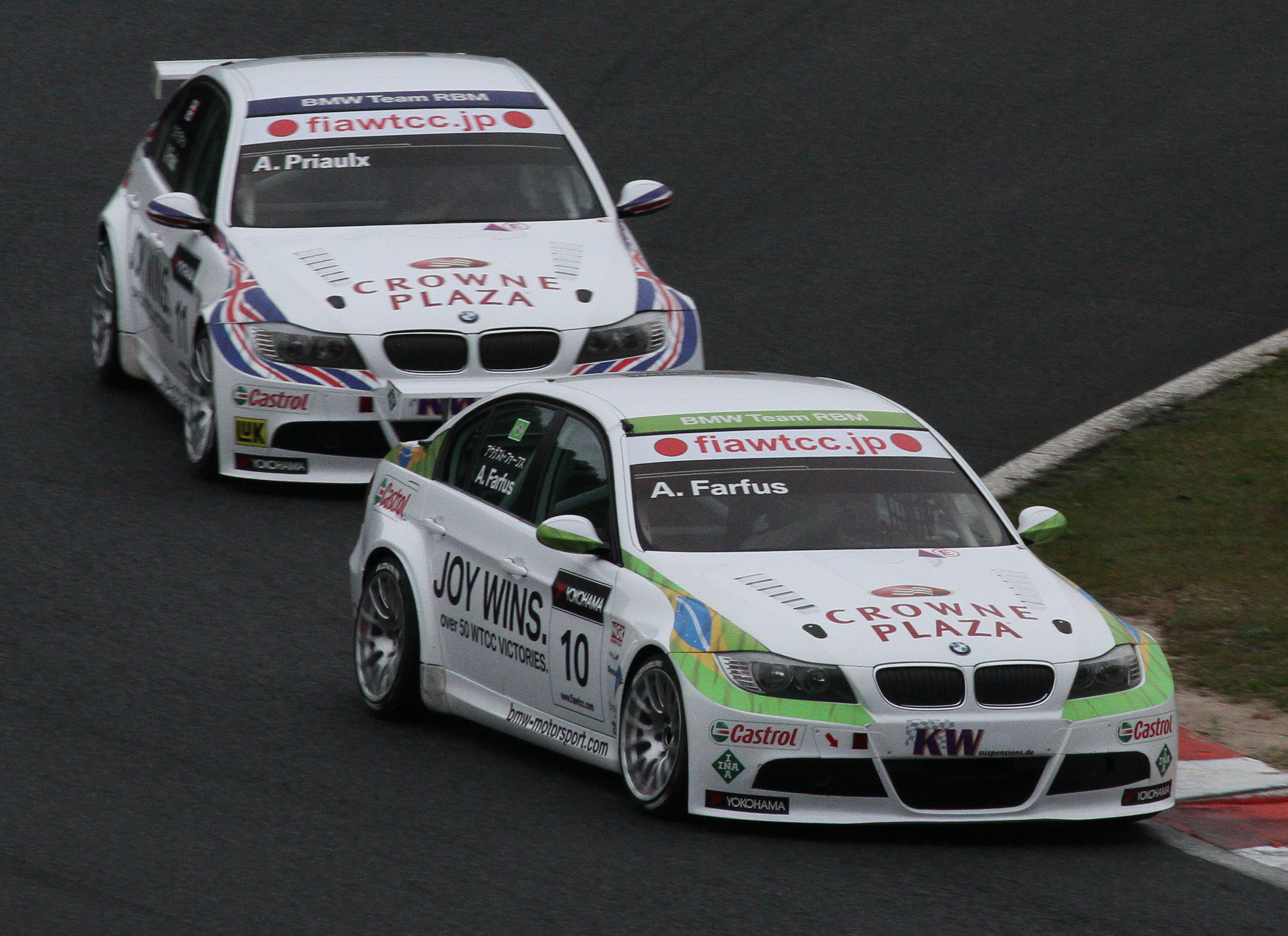
Augusto Farfus and Andy Priaulx during qualifying

Priaulx headed a BMW 1–2 in qualifying with RBM teammate Farfus starting alongside him on the front row. Turkington had set the pace in the first part of qualifying, beating the factory BMW pairing. All the championship contenders made it through to Q2 in addition to Turkington, Farfus, Michelisz, Engstler and debutant Rossi. Dahlgren was among those to drop out in Q1, while the Wiechers–Sport drivers had their times removed for accessing data from their car in parc ferme at the end of the session.

At the end of Q2, Priaulx and Farfus had locked out the front row for BMW Team RBM with Huff the next of the title challengers in third. Turkington ended up fourth on his return to the WTCC ahead of Michelisz and Tarquini. Championship leader Muller was eighth while Rossi and Engstler rounded out the top ten.

=== Warm-Up ===
Menu was the fastest driver in Sunday morning's warm–up session with Monteiro second and Coronel third, pole sitter Priaulx was fourteenth. Dahlgren was unable to take part as he required an engine change, incurring a ten–place grid drop for race one.

=== Race One ===
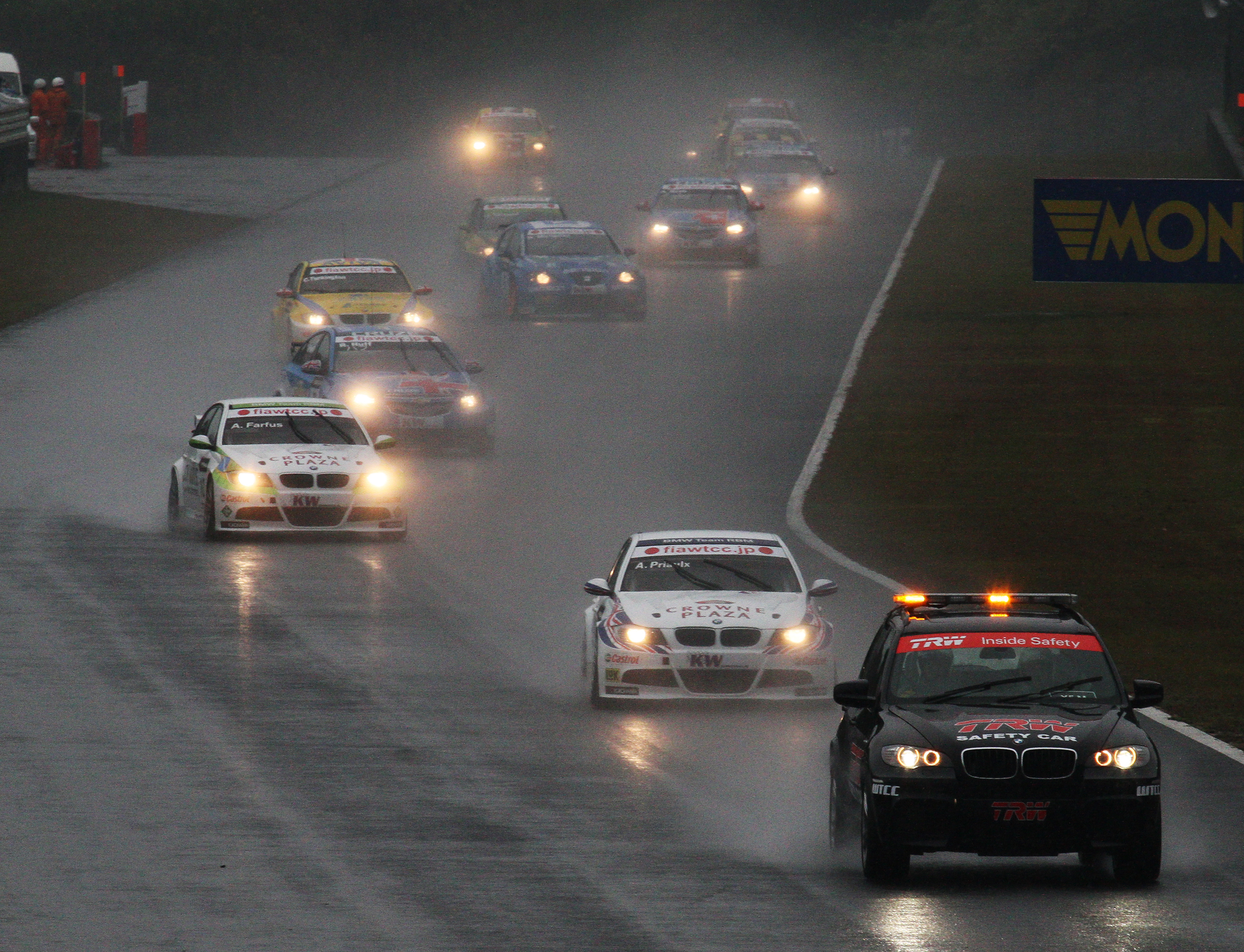
Race One started under Safety Car conditions.

The race started behind the safety car due to the severe wet conditions, Priaulx led away when the race was started on lap three. Huff passed Farfus immediately to take second place. Monteiro and Engstler slipped off the track at the first corner. Fredy Barth and Poulsen clashed further around the lap, Poulsen spun and took Stefano D'Aste with him. Huff and he eventually passed Priaulx on lap five. Muller was climbing up from eight on grid and made his way up to third place by the end of the race. Farfus had dropped down to fourth and was engaged in a close battle with Tarquini, who on lap six slid into the gravel trap at Williams and returned to the track in eighth place with only minor damage. At the end of the race, Huff was first with Priaulx second and Muller third. Yukinori Taniguchi was the Yokohama Trophy winner in eleventh.

The results of the successful appeal by Chevrolet to the FIA over the use of sequential gearboxes by the BMW Team RBM drivers meant Priaulx and Farfus were later disqualified. This promoted the bamboo–engineering drivers into the points with Yukinori Tanaguchi ending up ninth and O'Young tenth. Michelisz was promoted to third to take the first podium finish of his WTCC career.

=== Race Two ===
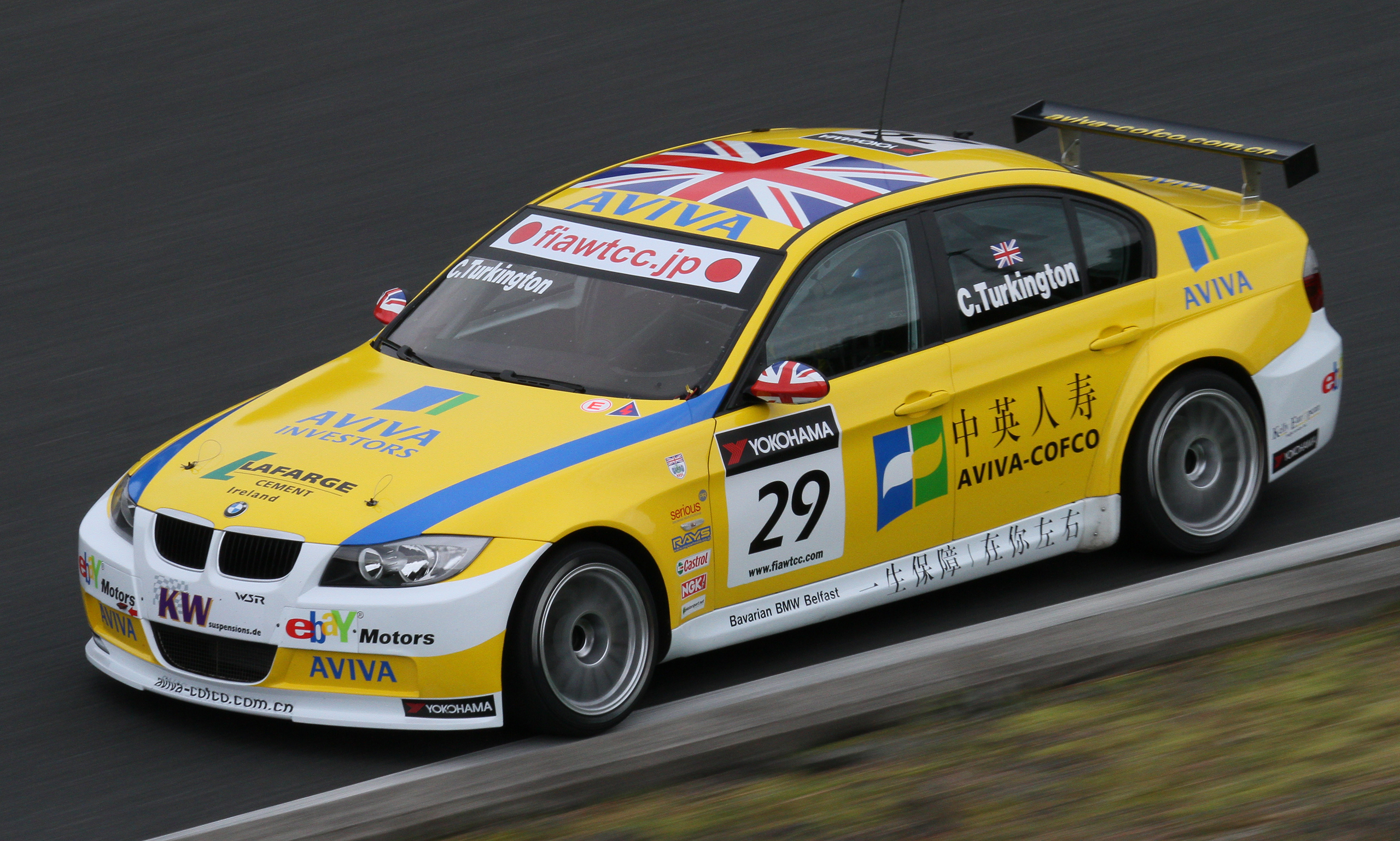
Race Two winner Colin Turkington

Michel Nykjær started on pole position for race two and led until lap nine when he slid off the track. Tarquini took over the lead of the race but went straight on at the Hobbs turn two laps later and retired, putting him out of championship contention. Farfus then assumed the lead of the race. His teammate Priaulx had spun into retirement after three laps, Yokohama Trophy leader Hernández did likewise after eleven laps. At the end of the race, Farfus took the win with Turkington holding off Muller to second. Nykjær ended up seventh while O'Young in tenth was the independents' winner.

After Chevrolet's appeal over the use of sequential gearboxes was taken into account and the BMW Team RBM drivers had been disqualified, Farfus lost the win and the victory was handed to Turkington, his first in the WTCC. Muller moved up to second and secured the drivers' championship title while Huff took the final podium position.

== Results ==
=== Qualifying ===
Pos.	No.	Name	Team	Car	C	Q1	Q2
1	11	(United Kingdom) Andy Priaulx	BMW Team RBM	BMW 320si		1:37.623	1:36.972
2	10	(Brazil) Augusto Farfus	BMW Team RBM	BMW 320si		1:37.455	1:37.408
3	7	(United Kingdom) Robert Huff	Chevrolet RML	Chevrolet Cruze LT		1:37.690	1:37.441
4	29	(United Kingdom) Colin Turkington	Team Aviva-COFCO	BMW 320si		1:37.264	1:37.495
5	5	(Hungary) Norbert Michelisz	Zengő-Dension Team	SEAT León 2.0 TDI		1:37.707	1:37.577
6	1	(Italy) Gabriele Tarquini	SR-Sport	SEAT León 2.0 TDI		1:37.725	1:37.727
7	8	(Switzerland) Alain Menu	Chevrolet RML	Chevrolet Cruze LT		1:37.805	1:37.844
8	6	(France) Yvan Muller	Chevrolet RML	Chevrolet Cruze LT		1:37.767	1:37.913
9	73	(France) Michaël Rossi	SR-Sport	SEAT León 2.0 TDI		1:37.809	1:38.387
10	15	(Germany) Franz Engstler	Liqui Moly Team Engstler	BMW 320si	Y	1:37.786	1:38.605
11	3	(Portugal) Tiago Monteiro	SR-Sport	SEAT León 2.0 TDI		1:37.904	
12	17	(Denmark) Michel Nykjær	SUNRED Engineering	SEAT León 2.0 TDI		1:37.904	
13	20	(Hong Kong) Darryl O'Young	bamboo-engineering	Chevrolet Lacetti	Y	1:38.056	
14	41	(Sweden) Robert Dahlgren	Volvo Olsbergs Green Racing	Volvo C30		1:38.128	
15	24	(Denmark) Kristian Poulsen	Poulsen Motorsport	BMW 320si	Y	1:38.156	
16	18	(Switzerland) Fredy Barth	SEAT Swiss Racing by SUNRED	SEAT León 2.0 TDI		1:38.171	
17	2	(Netherlands) Tom Coronel	SR-Sport	SEAT León 2.0 TDI		1:38.190	
18	26	(Italy) Stefano D'Aste	Scuderia Proteam Motorsport	BMW 320si	Y	1:38.540	
19	25	(Spain) Sergio Hernández	Scuderia Proteam Motorsport	BMW 320si	Y	1:38.728	
20	72	(Japan) Yukinori Taniguchi	bamboo-engineering	Chevrolet Lacetti	Y	1:38.747	
21	16	(Russia) Andrei Romanov	Liqui Moly Team Engstler	BMW 320si	Y	1:39.098	
22	44	(Japan) Yoshihiro Ito	Liqui Moly Team Engstler	BMW 320si	Y	1:39.584	
23	43	(Japan) Nobuteru Taniguchi	Scuderia Proteam Motorsport	BMW 320si	Y	1:39.891	
24	45	(Taiwan) Kevin Chen	Scuderia Proteam Motorsport	BMW 320si	Y	1:39.997	
25	51	(Macau) Henry Ho	Ho Chun Kei / Sports & You Asia	BMW 320si	Y	1:40.681	
EX	21	(Morocco) Mehdi Bennani	Wiechers-Sport	BMW 320si	Y	Excluded	
EX	46	(Japan) Masataka Yanagida	Wiechers-Sport	BMW 320si	Y	Excluded	

=== Race 1 ===
Pos.	No.	Name	Team	Car	C	Laps	Time/Retired	Grid	Points
1	7	(United Kingdom) Robert Huff	Chevrolet RML	Chevrolet Cruze LT		16	31:46.668	3	25
2	6	(France) **Yvan Muller**	Chevrolet RML	Chevrolet Cruze LT		16	+4.931	8	18
3	5	(Hungary) Norbert Michelisz	Zengő-Dension Team	SEAT León 2.0 TDI		16	+9.742	5	15
4	29	(United Kingdom) Colin Turkington	Team Aviva-COFCO	BMW 320si		16	+11.310	4	12
5	1	(Italy) Gabriele Tarquini	SR-Sport	SEAT León 2.0 TDI		16	+13.876	6	10
6	17	(Denmark) Michel Nykjær	SUNRED Engineering	SEAT León 2.0 TDI		16	+14.901	12	8
7	8	(Switzerland) Alain Menu	Chevrolet RML	Chevrolet Cruze LT		16	+30.022	7	6
8	41	(Sweden) Robert Dahlgren	Volvo Olsbergs Green Racing	Volvo C30		16	+31.077	24	
9	72	(Japan) Yukinori Taniguchi	bamboo-engineering	Chevrolet Lacetti	Y	16	+1:13.148	19	4
10	20	(Hong Kong) Darryl O'Young	bamboo-engineering	Chevrolet Lacetti	Y	16	+1:15.995	13	2
11	25	(Spain) Sergio Hernández	Scuderia Proteam Motorsport	BMW 320si	Y	16	+1:17.546	18	1
12	43	(Japan) Nobuteru Taniguchi	Scuderia Proteam Motorsport	BMW 320si	Y	16	+1:17.857	22	
13	15	(Germany) Franz Engstler	Liqui Moly Team Engstler	BMW 320si	Y	16	+1:19.035	10	
14	2	(Netherlands) Tom Coronel	SR-Sport	SEAT León 2.0 TDI		16	+1:22.055	16	
15	24	(Denmark) Kristian Poulsen	Poulsen Motorsport	BMW 320si	Y	16	+1:26.602	14	
16	21	(Morocco) Mehdi Bennani	Wiechers-Sport	BMW 320si	Y	16	+1:30.373	26	
17	46	(Japan) Masataka Yanagida	Wiechers-Sport	BMW 320si	Y	16	+1:30.957	27	
18	51	(Macau) Henry Ho	Ho Chun Kei / Sports & You Asia	BMW 320si	Y	15	+1 Lap	25	
19	44	(Japan) Yoshihiro Ito	Liqui Moly Team Engstler	BMW 320si	Y	15	+1 Lap	21	
Ret	45	(Taiwan) Kevin Chen	Scuderia Proteam Motorsport	BMW 320si	Y	9	Race incident	23	
NC	16	(Russia) Andrei Romanov	Liqui Moly Team Engstler	BMW 320si	Y	9	+7 Laps	20	
Ret	73	(France) Michaël Rossi	SR-Sport	SEAT León 2.0 TDI		6	Race incident	9	
Ret	3	(Portugal) Tiago Monteiro	SR-Sport	SEAT León 2.0 TDI		2	Race incident	11	
Ret	18	(Switzerland) Fredy Barth	SEAT Swiss Racing by SUNRED	SEAT León 2.0 TDI		2	Race incident	15	
Ret	26	(Italy) Stefano D'Aste	Scuderia Proteam Motorsport	BMW 320si	Y	2	Race incident	17	
DSQ	11	(United Kingdom) Andy Priaulx	BMW Team RBM	BMW 320si		16	Disqualified	1	
DSQ	10	(Brazil) Augusto Farfus	BMW Team RBM	BMW 320si		16	Disqualified	2	

- **Bold** denotes Fastest lap.

=== Race 2 ===
Pos.	No.	Name	Team	Car	C	Laps	Time/Retired	Grid	Points
1	29	(United Kingdom) Colin Turkington	Team Aviva-COFCO	BMW 320si		16	33:48.074	3	25
2	6	(France) Yvan Muller	Chevrolet RML	Chevrolet Cruze LT		16	+0.724	6	18
3	7	(United Kingdom) Robert Huff	Chevrolet RML	Chevrolet Cruze LT		16	+1.822	8	15
4	8	(Switzerland) Alain Menu	Chevrolet RML	Chevrolet Cruze LT		16	+2.826	9	12
5	41	(Sweden) Robert Dahlgren	Volvo Olsbergs Green Racing	Volvo C30		16	+3.165	10	
6	17	(Denmark) **Michel Nykjær**	SUNRED Engineering	SEAT León 2.0 TDI		16	+4.174	1	10
7	5	(Hungary) Norbert Michelisz	Zengő-Dension Team	SEAT León 2.0 TDI		16	+5.432	4	8
8	2	(Netherlands) Tom Coronel	SR-Sport	SEAT León 2.0 TDI		16	+5.901	21	6
9	20	(Hong Kong) Darryl O'Young	bamboo-engineering	Chevrolet Lacetti	Y	16	+7.061	12	4
10	15	(Germany) Franz Engstler	Liqui Moly Team Engstler	BMW 320si	Y	16	+7.613	15	2
11	24	(Denmark) Kristian Poulsen	Poulsen Motorsport	BMW 320si	Y	16	+7.806	16	1
12	73	(France) Michaël Rossi	SR-Sport	SEAT León 2.0 TDI		16	+8.271	24	
13	18	(Switzerland) Fredy Barth	SEAT Swiss Racing by SUNRED	SEAT León 2.0 TDI		16	+9.309	26	
14	46	(Japan) Masataka Yanagida	Wiechers-Sport	BMW 320si	Y	16	+10.628	18	
15	16	(Russia) Andrei Romanov	Liqui Moly Team Engstler	BMW 320si	Y	16	+10.698	23	
16	72	(Japan) Yukinori Taniguchi	bamboo-engineering	Chevrolet Lacetti	Y	16	+13.036	11	
17	26	(Italy) Stefano D'Aste	Scuderia Proteam Motorsport	BMW 320si	Y	16	+13.679	27	
18	43	(Japan) Nobuteru Taniguchi	Scuderia Proteam Motorsport	BMW 320si	Y	16	+27.107	14	
19	21	(Morocco) Mehdi Bennani	Wiechers-Sport	BMW 320si	Y	16	+31.104	17	
20	45	(Taiwan) Kevin Chen	Scuderia Proteam Motorsport	BMW 320si	Y	15	+1 Lap	22	
21	51	(Macau) Henry Ho	Ho Chun Kei / Sports & You Asia	BMW 320si	Y	13	+3 Laps	19	
Ret	25	(Spain) Sergio Hernández	Scuderia Proteam Motorsport	BMW 320si	Y	11	Race incident	13	
Ret	1	(Italy) Gabriele Tarquini	SR-Sport	SEAT León 2.0 TDI		10	Race incident	2	
Ret	3	(Portugal) Tiago Monteiro	SR-Sport	SEAT León 2.0 TDI		10	Race incident	25	
Ret	44	(Japan) Yoshihiro Ito	Liqui Moly Team Engstler	BMW 320si	Y	7	Race incident	20	
DSQ	10	(Brazil) Augusto Farfus	BMW Team RBM	BMW 320si		16	Disqualified	5	
DSQ	11	(United Kingdom) Andy Priaulx	BMW Team RBM	BMW 320si		3	Disqualified	7	

- **Bold** denotes Fastest lap.

== Standings after the event ==
Drivers' Championship standings

	Pos	Driver	Points
	1	(France) Yvan Muller	301
1	2	(Italy) Gabriele Tarquini	246
1	3	(United Kingdom) Andy Priaulx	240
	4	(United Kingdom) Robert Huff	236
1	5	(Switzerland) Alain Menu	167

Yokohama Independents' Trophy standings

	Pos	Driver	Points
	1	(Spain) Sergio Hernández	124
2	2	(Hong Kong) Darryl O'Young	103
1	3	(Denmark) Kristian Poulsen	97
1	4	(Germany) Franz Engstler	95
2	5	(Italy) Stefano D'Aste	88

Manufacturers' Championship standings

Pos	Manufacturer	Points
1	(United States) Chevrolet	645
2	(Spain) SEAT Customers Technology	571
3	(Germany) BMW	544

- Note: Only the top five positions are included for both sets of drivers' standings.
