= 2002 Deutsche Tourenwagen Masters =

Sports season

Champions
- Drivers' Champion: Laurent Aïello
- Teams' Champion: HWA Team

Seasons
- ← 2001 2003 →

The 2002 Deutsche Tourenwagen Masters was the sixteenth season of premier German touring car championship and also third season under the moniker of Deutsche Tourenwagen Masters since the series' resumption in 2000. There were ten race weekends with two races; a 30 km qualifying race and a 100 km main race at each event.

Laurent Aïello was the Drivers Champion driving an Audi, and HWA Team were the Teams Champion utilising Mercedes-Benz cars.

== Changes for 2002 ==
Rule Changes

- Standing starts were introduced for the first time.
- Formula One points system was adopted.
- HANS devices were mandatory for all drivers.

Calendar Changes

- Only one race would now take place at the Nürburgring.
- Oschersleben was removed from the calendar.
- Donington Park and Zolder were added to the calendar.

== Teams and drivers ==
The following manufacturers, teams and drivers competed in the 2002 Deutsche Tourenwagen Masters. All teams competed with tyres supplied by Dunlop.

Manufacturer	Car	Team	No.	Drivers	Rounds
Mercedes-Benz	AMG-Mercedes CLK-DTM 2002	HWA Team	1	(Germany) Bernd Schneider	All
Mercedes-Benz	AMG-Mercedes CLK-DTM 2002	HWA Team	2	(France) Jean Alesi	All
Mercedes-Benz	AMG-Mercedes CLK-DTM 2002	HWA Team	5	(Germany) Uwe Alzen	All
Mercedes-Benz	AMG-Mercedes CLK-DTM 2002	HWA Team	6	(Switzerland) Marcel Fässler	All
Mercedes-Benz	AMG-Mercedes CLK-DTM 2001	Persson Motorsport	11	(Germany) Thomas Jäger	All
Mercedes-Benz	AMG-Mercedes CLK-DTM 2001	Persson Motorsport	12	(United Kingdom) Peter Dumbreck	All
Mercedes-Benz	AMG-Mercedes CLK-DTM 2001	Manthey Racing	16	(Germany) Marcel Tiemann	1
Mercedes-Benz	AMG-Mercedes CLK-DTM 2001	Manthey Racing	16	(Germany) Bernd Mayländer	2–10
Mercedes-Benz	AMG-Mercedes CLK-DTM 2001	Manthey Racing	17	(Netherlands) Patrick Huisman	All
Mercedes-Benz	AMG-Mercedes CLK-DTM 2001	Team Rosberg	24	(Germany) Stefan Mücke	All
Mercedes-Benz	AMG-Mercedes CLK-DTM 2001	Team Rosberg	42	(Netherlands) Christijan Albers	All
Audi	Abt-Audi TT-R	Abt Sportsline	3	(France) Laurent Aïello	All
Audi	Abt-Audi TT-R	Abt Sportsline	4	(Austria) Karl Wendlinger	All
Audi	Abt-Audi TT-R	Abt Sportsline	9	(Sweden) Mattias Ekström	All
Audi	Abt-Audi TT-R	Abt Sportsline	10	(Germany) Christian Abt	All
Audi	Abt-Audi TT-R	Abt Sportsline	23	(Germany) Martin Tomczyk	All
Opel	Opel Astra V8 Coupé 2002	OPC Team Phoenix	7	(Germany) Manuel Reuter	All
Opel	Opel Astra V8 Coupé 2002	OPC Team Phoenix	8	(Germany) Joachim Winkelhock	All
Opel	Opel Astra V8 Coupé 2002	OPC Team Holzer	14	(Germany) Timo Scheider	All
Opel	Opel Astra V8 Coupé 2002	OPC Team Holzer	15	(Germany) Michael Bartels	All
Opel	Opel Astra V8 Coupé 2001	OPC Euroteam	18	(Switzerland) Alain Menu	All
Opel	Opel Astra V8 Coupé 2001	OPC Euroteam	19	(Belgium) Yves Olivier	1–7
Opel	Opel Astra V8 Coupé 2001	OPC Euroteam	31	(Venezuela) Johnny Cecotto	10
Opel	Opel Astra V8 Coupé 2001	OPC Euroteam	43	(Finland) JJ Lehto	8
Opel	Opel Astra V8 Coupé 2001	OPC Euroteam	44	(France) Éric Hélary	9

== Race calendar and winners ==
Six rounds would be held in Germany, with the remainder in Belgium, Great Britain, Austria and the Netherlands. Both races at Hockenheim would take place on the new circuit for the first time.

Round		Circuit	Date	Pole position	Fastest lap	Winning driver	Winning team	Winning manufacturer	TV
1	QR	(Germany) Hockenheimring	21 April	(France) Laurent Aïello	(France) Laurent Aïello	(Germany) Martin Tomczyk	Team Abt Sportsline Junior	Audi	ARD
1	CR	(Germany) Hockenheimring	21 April		(Germany) Christian Abt	(France) Laurent Aïello	Team Abt Sportsline	Audi	ARD
2	QR	(Belgium) Zolder	5 May	(Germany) Martin Tomczyk	(Germany) Christian Abt	(France) Laurent Aïello	Team Abt Sportsline	Audi	ZDF
2	CR	(Belgium) Zolder	5 May		(France) Laurent Aïello	(France) Laurent Aïello	Team Abt Sportsline	Audi	ZDF
3	QR	(United Kingdom) Donington Park	19 May	(Germany) Manuel Reuter	(Germany) Timo Scheider	(France) Jean Alesi	Vodafone AMG Mercedes	Mercedes-Benz	ARD
3	CR	(United Kingdom) Donington Park	19 May		(Switzerland) Marcel Fässler	(France) Jean Alesi	Vodafone AMG Mercedes	Mercedes-Benz	ARD
4	QR	(Germany) Sachsenring	2 June	(France) Laurent Aïello	(Austria) Karl Wendlinger	(France) Laurent Aïello	Team Abt Sportsline	Audi	ZDF
4	CR	(Germany) Sachsenring	2 June		(Germany) Michael Bartels	(France) Laurent Aïello	Team Abt Sportsline	Audi	ZDF
5	QR	(Germany) Norisring	30 June	(Sweden) Mattias Ekström	(Sweden) Mattias Ekström	(Sweden) Mattias Ekström	Team Abt	Audi	ZDF
5	CR	(Germany) Norisring	30 June		(France) Laurent Aïello	(France) Laurent Aïello	Team Abt Sportsline	Audi	ZDF
6	QR	(Germany) Lausitzring	14 July	(France) Laurent Aïello	(France) Laurent Aïello	(France) Laurent Aïello	Team Abt Sportsline	Mercedes-Benz	ZDF
6	CR	(Germany) Lausitzring	14 July		(Germany) Bernd Schneider	(Germany) Bernd Schneider	Vodafone AMG Mercedes	Mercedes-Benz	ZDF
7	QR	(Germany) Nürburgring	4 August	(Germany) Uwe Alzen	(France) Jean Alesi	(Germany) Uwe Alzen	Warsteiner AMG Mercedes	Mercedes-Benz	ARD
7	CR	(Germany) Nürburgring	4 August		(Sweden) Mattias Ekström	(Germany) Uwe Alzen	Warsteiner AMG Mercedes	Mercedes-Benz	ARD
8	QR	(Austria) A1-Ring	8 September	(France) Laurent Aïello	(France) Laurent Aïello	(Sweden) Mattias Ekström	Team Abt	Audi	ARD
8	CR	(Austria) A1-Ring	8 September		(Germany) Uwe Alzen	(Switzerland) Marcel Fässler	Warsteiner AMG Mercedes	Mercedes-Benz	ARD
9	QR	(Netherlands) Zandvoort	29 September	(France) Laurent Aïello	(Germany) Christian Abt	(Switzerland) Marcel Fässler	Warsteiner AMG Mercedes	Mercedes-Benz	ARD
9	CR	(Netherlands) Zandvoort	29 September		(Sweden) Mattias Ekström	(Sweden) Mattias Ekström	Team Abt	Audi	ARD
10	QR	(Germany) Hockenheimring	6 October	(Germany) Bernd Schneider	(Germany) Bernd Schneider	(France) Laurent Aïello	Team Abt Sportsline	Audi	ZDF
10	CR	(Germany) Hockenheimring	6 October		(France) Laurent Aïello	(Germany) Bernd Schneider	Vodafone AMG Mercedes	Mercedes	ZDF

== Championship standings ==
Scoring system

Each round featured a "Qualifying Race", and the "Main Race".

- In the "Qualifying Race", the top 3 finishers were awarded points as follows;

Position	**1st**	**2nd**	**3rd**
Points	3	2	1

- In the "Main Race", the top 6 finishers were awarded points as follows;

Position	**1st**	**2nd**	**3rd**	**4th**	**5th**	**6th**
Points	10	6	4	3	2	1

=== Drivers' championship ===
Pos	Driver	HOC (Germany)		ZOL (Belgium)		DON (United Kingdom)		SAC (Germany)		NOR (Germany)		LAU (Germany)		NÜR (Germany)		A1R (Austria)		ZAN (Netherlands)		HOC (Germany)		Pts
Pos	Driver	QR	CR	QR	CR	QR	CR	QR	CR	QR	CR	QR	CR	QR	CR	QR	CR	QR	CR	QR	CR	Pts
1	(France) Laurent Aïello	**2**	1	1	**1**	18	DSQ	**1**	**1**	4	1	**1**	**4**	2	2	**3**	5	**DSQ**	6	1	**6**	70
2	(Germany) Bernd Schneider	11	4	6	3	8	12	3	2	3	2	2	1	3	3	2	2	6	2	**2**	1	64
3	(Sweden) Mattias Ekström	3	2	2	4	9	3	14	7	**1**	**3**	4	2	16	10	1	**11**	3	1	3	2	50
4	(Switzerland) Marcel Fässler	6	Ret	10	9	4	6	9	4	Ret	DNS	6	3	4	4	10	1	1	**3**	Ret	5	30
5	(France) Jean Alesi	8	3	9	10	1	**1**	16	Ret	5	4	14	8	11	Ret	4	3	14	8	Ret	Ret	24
6	(Germany) Uwe Alzen	9	11	8	7	Ret	DNS	11	9	2	5	9	Ret	**1**	**1**	5	4	7	17	8	3	24
7	(Germany) Christian Abt	4	7	5	2	12	2	8	16†	DSQ	DNS	3	7	5	9	12	9	2	7	5	13	15
8	(Germany) Timo Scheider	5	5	4	5	5	Ret	7	6	Ret	DNS	13	10	9	7	11	8	8	5	7	4	10
9	(Switzerland) Alain Menu	17	9	17	14	6	8	2	3	14	Ret	8	11	7	Ret	7	6	4	Ret	18†	Ret	7
10	(Germany) Manuel Reuter	18	17†	11	15	**3**	14†	18	Ret	8	7	11	5	8	6	8	7	5	4	6	Ret	7
11	(Germany) Martin Tomczyk	1	**Ret**	**21**†	Ret	2	Ret	4	Ret	DNS	DNS	5	9	10	5	6	Ret	11	18	Ret	Ret	7
12	(Netherlands) Christijan Albers	Ret	Ret	13	6	11	4	13	8	10	6	20	14	18	17	19	13	Ret	12	11	9	5
13	(Germany) Joachim Winkelhock	16	10	18	17	Ret	DNS	5	5	6	Ret	7	6	13	15	9	19	15	10	9	7	3
14	(Austria) Karl Wendlinger	10	6	12	18	7	5	21†	DNS	Ret	12	10	Ret	6	12	13	16	9	19	4	Ret	3
15	(Germany) Michael Bartels	13	14	3	8	13	Ret	10	11	DSQ	11	19	17	19	11	21	15	10	Ret	16	Ret	1
16	(Netherlands) Patrick Huisman	20	12	7	12	16	7	20	14	Ret	10	15	12	14	18	17	12	13	16	17†	Ret	0
17	(United Kingdom) Peter Dumbreck	7	16†	16	13	17	10	12	10	12	9	16	15	17	8	15	18	18	13	13	12	0
18	(Germany) Thomas Jäger	19	8	14	19†	10	11	15	15	7	Ret	12	13	7	13	14	17	12	9	15	11	0
19	(Germany) Bernd Mayländer			19	16	14	9	19	13	11	8	17	Ret	21†	14	16	Ret	17	11	12	Ret	0
20	(Germany) Stefan Mücke	12	Ret	15	11	15	13	17	Ret	9	Ret	18	16	12	17	20	14	19	15	10	8	0
21	(Finland) JJ Lehto															18	10					0
22	(Venezuela) Johnny Cecotto																			14	10	0
23	(Belgium) Yves Olivier	14	13	20†	DNS	19†	Ret	6	12	13	13	21†	Ret	15	19†							0
24	(France) Éric Hélary																	16	14			0
25	(Germany) Marcel Tiemann	15	15																			0
Pos	Driver	QR	CR	QR	CR	QR	CR	QR	CR	QR	CR	QR	CR	QR	CR	QR	CR	QR	CR	QR	CR	Pts
Pos	Driver	HOC (Germany)		ZOL (Belgium)		DON (United Kingdom)		SAC (Germany)		NOR (Germany)		LAU (Germany)		NÜR (Germany)		A1R (Austria)		ZAN (Netherlands)		HOC (Germany)		Pts

Colour	Result
Gold	Winner
Silver	Second place
Bronze	Third place
Green	Points classification
Blue	Non-points classification
Blue	Non-classified finish (NC)
Purple	Retired, not classified (Ret)
Red	Did not qualify (DNQ)
Red	Did not pre-qualify (DNPQ)
Black	Disqualified (DSQ)
White	Did not start (DNS)
White	Withdrew (WD)
White	Race cancelled (C)
Blank	Did not practice (DNP)
Blank	Did not arrive (DNA)
Blank	Excluded (EX)

**Bold** – Pole
Italics – Fastest Lap

- † – Driver retired, but was classified as they completed 90% of the winner's race distance.

=== Teams' championship ===
Pos	Team	Car No.	HOC (Germany)		ZOL (Belgium)		DON (United Kingdom)		SAC (Germany)		NOR (Germany)		LAU (Germany)		NÜR (Germany)		A1R (Austria)		ZAN (Netherlands)		HOC (Germany)		Pts
Pos	Team	Car No.	QR	CR	QR	CR	QR	CR	QR	CR	QR	CR	QR	CR	QR	CR	QR	CR	QR	CR	QR	CR	Pts
1	Vodafone AMG Mercedes	1	11	4	6	3	8	12	3	2	3	2	2	1	3	3	2	2	6	2	**2**	1	88
1	Vodafone AMG Mercedes	2	8	3	9	10	1	**1**	16	Ret	5	4	14	8	11	Ret	4	3	14	8	Ret	Ret	88
2	Team Abt Sportsline	3	**2**	1	1	**1**	18	DSQ	**1**	**1**	4	1	**1**	**4**	2	2	**3**	5	**DSQ**	6	1	**6**	85
2	Team Abt Sportsline	10	4	7	5	2	12	2	8	16†	DSQ	DNS	3	7	5	9	12	9	2	7	5	13	85
3	Warsteiner AMG Mercedes	5	9	11	8	7	Ret	DNS	11	9	2	5	9	Ret	**1**	**1**	5	4	7	17	8	3	54
3	Warsteiner AMG Mercedes	6	6	Ret	10	9	4	6	9	4	Ret	DNS	6	3	4	4	10	1	1	**3**	Ret	5	54
4	Team Abt	4	10	6	12	18	7	5	21†	DNS	Ret	12	10	Ret	6	12	13	16	9	19	4	Ret	53
4	Team Abt	9	3	2	2	4	9	3	14	7	**1**	**3**	4	2	16	10	1	**11**	3	1	3	2	53
5	OPC Team Holzer	14	5	5	4	5	5	Ret	7	6	Ret	DNS	13	10	9	7	11	8	8	5	7	4	11
5	OPC Team Holzer	15	13	14	3	8	13	Ret	10	11	DSQ	11	19	17	19	11	21	15	10	Ret	16	Ret	11
6	OPC Team Phoenix	7	18	17†	11	15	**3**	14†	18	Ret	8	7	11	5	8	6	8	7	5	4	6	Ret	10
6	OPC Team Phoenix	8	16	10	18	17	Ret	DNS	5	5	6	Ret	7	6	13	15	9	19	15	10	9	7	10
7	OPC Euroteam	18	17	9	17	14	6	8	2	3	14	Ret	8	11	7	Ret	7	6	4	Ret	18†	Ret	10
7	OPC Euroteam	19/31/ 43/44	14	13	20†	DNS	19†	Ret	6	12	13	13	21†	Ret	15	19†	18	10	16	14	14	10	10
8	Team Abt Sportsline Junior	23	1	**Ret**	**21**†	Ret	2	Ret	4	Ret	DNS	DNS	5	9	10	5	6	Ret	11	18	Ret	Ret	7
9	Service 24h AMG Mercedes	24	12	Ret	15	11	15	13	17	Ret	9	Ret	18	16	12	17	20	14	19	15	10	8	5
9	Service 24h AMG Mercedes	42	Ret	Ret	13	6	11	4	13	8	10	6	20	14	18	17	19	13	Ret	12	11	9	5
10	Oase / CEB AMG Mercedes	16	15	15	19	16	14	9	19	13	11	8	17	Ret	21†	14	16	Ret	17	11	12	Ret	0
10	Oase / CEB AMG Mercedes	17	20	12	7	12	16	7	20	14	Ret	10	15	12	14	18	17	12	13	16	17†	Ret	0
11	Original-Teile AMG Mercedes	11	19	8	14	19†	10	11	15	15	7	Ret	12	13	7	13	14	17	12	9	15	11	0
11	Original-Teile AMG Mercedes	12	7	16†	16	13	17	10	12	10	12	9	16	15	17	8	15	18	18	13	13	12	0
Pos	Team	Car No.	QR	CR	QR	CR	QR	CR	QR	CR	QR	CR	QR	CR	QR	CR	QR	CR	QR	CR	QR	CR	Pts
Pos	Team	Car No.	HOC (Germany)		ZOL (Belgium)		DON (United Kingdom)		SAC (Germany)		NOR (Germany)		LAU (Germany)		NÜR (Germany)		A1R (Austria)		ZAN (Netherlands)		HOC (Germany)		Pts

== Bibliography ==
- Voigt, Thomas; Bock, Friedemann; Kasan, Burkhard (2002). Tourenwagen Story 2002: Die Rennen, die Fahrer, die Technik (in German). Königswinter: Heel Verlag. ISBN 978-3-89365-960-9.
