= Opel DTM V8 engine =

Opel DTM V8 racing engine

Overview
- Manufacturer: Opel; Spiess (tuner)
- Production: 2000-2005

Layout
- Configuration: Naturally aspirated 90° V-8
- Displacement: 4.0 L (244 cu in)
- Cylinder bore: 93 mm (3.66 in)
- Piston stroke: 73 mm (2.87 in)
- Valvetrain: 32-valve, DOHC, four-valves per cylinder

Combustion
- Turbocharger: No
- Fuel system: Bosch Electronic indirect multi-point fuel injection
- Management: Bosch
- Fuel type: Shell (later Aral) racing gasoline
- Oil system: Dry sump (Shell Racing oil SR)

Output
- Power output: 444–574 hp (331–428 kW)
- Torque output: 376–466 lb⋅ft (510–632 N⋅m)

The Opel DTM V8 engine family is a series of prototype, four-stroke, 4.0-liter, naturally aspirated DOHC V-8 racing engines, designed, developed and produced by Opel, and specially tuned by German manufacturer Spiess, for the Deutsche Tourenwagen Meisterschaft, between 2000 and 2005. The Opel DTM V8 engine majorly based on GM Northstar L47 engine that same as Oldsmobile Indy Racing League engine unit.

== Applications ==
- Opel Astra DTM
- Opel Vectra GTS V8 DTM
