= 2001 Deutsche Tourenwagen Masters =

German motorsport season

Champions
- Drivers' Champion: Bernd Schneider
- Teams' Champion: HWA Team I

Seasons
- ← 2000 2002 →

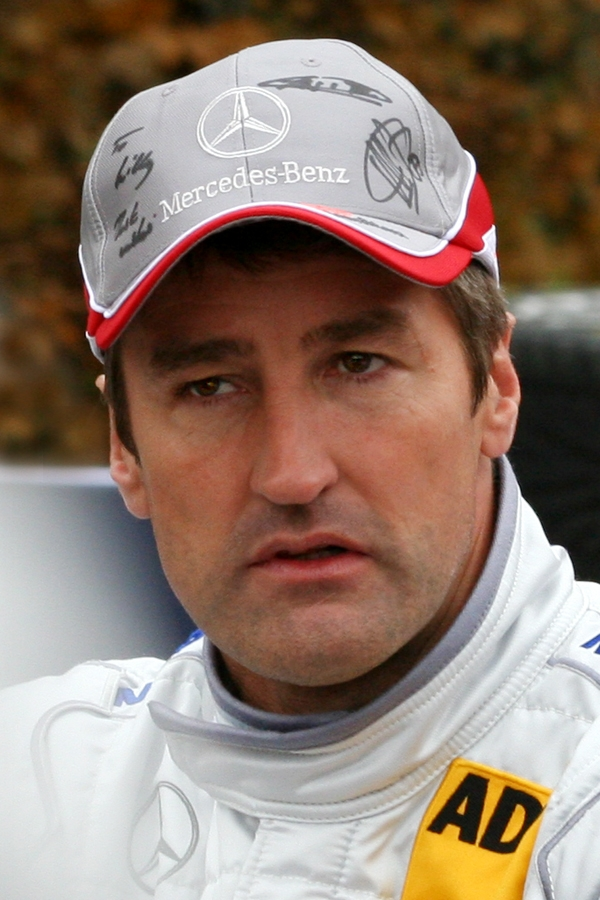
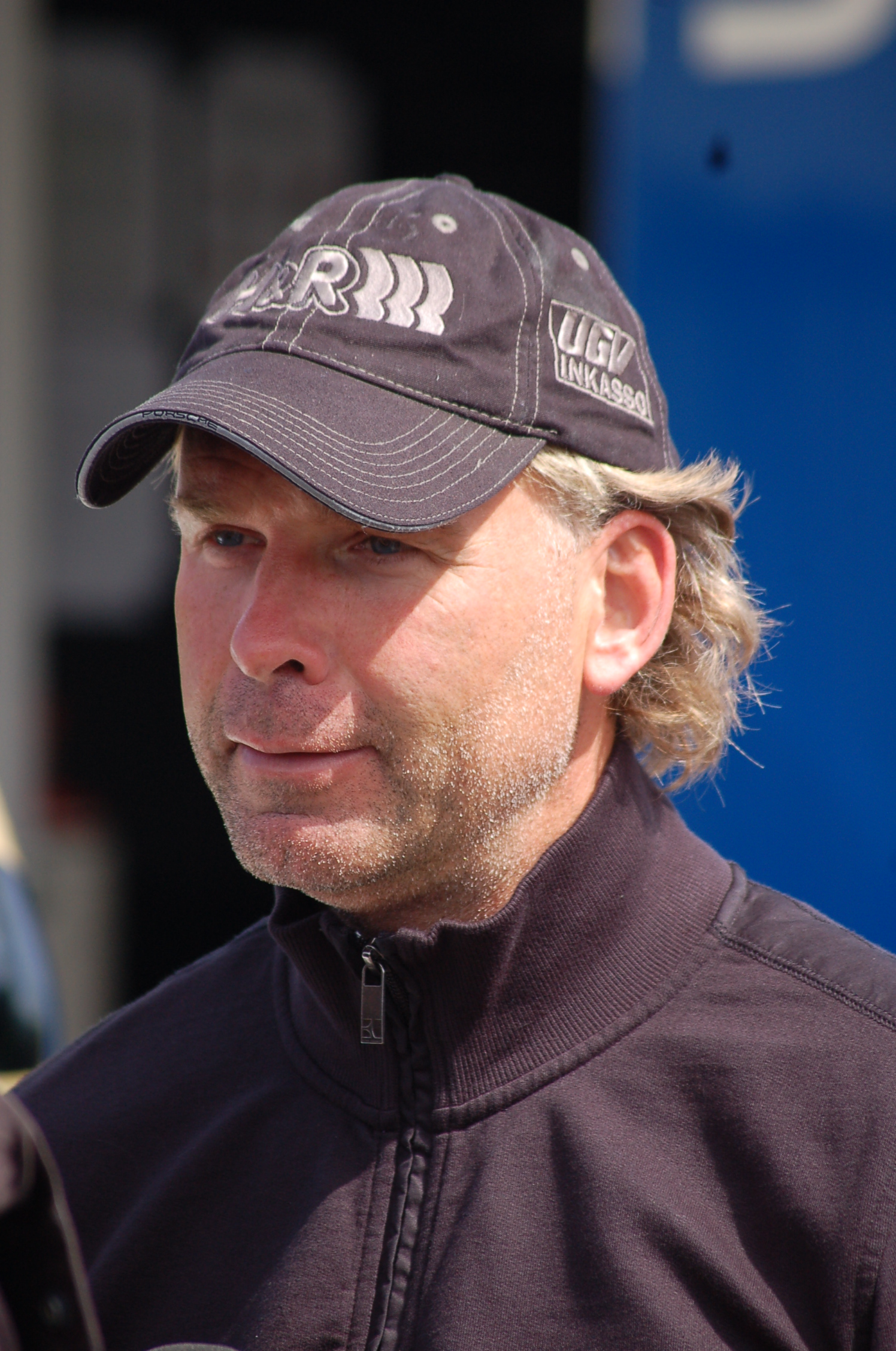
Bernd Schneider (left) defend his second Deutsche Tourenwagen Masters Drivers' Championship while Uwe Alzen (right) finished second in the championship.

The 2001 Deutsche Tourenwagen Masters was the fifteenth season of premier German touring car championship and also second season under the moniker of Deutsche Tourenwagen Masters since the series' resumption in 2000. There were ten race weekends with one race at each event.

== Teams and drivers ==
The following manufacturers, teams and drivers competed in the 2001 Deutsche Tourenwagen Masters. All teams competed with tyres supplied by Dunlop.

Manufacturer	Car	Team	No.	Drivers	Rounds
Mercedes-Benz	AMG-Mercedes CLK-DTM 2001	(Germany) HWA Team	1	(Germany) Bernd Schneider	All
Mercedes-Benz	AMG-Mercedes CLK-DTM 2001	(Germany) HWA Team	2	(United Kingdom) Peter Dumbreck	All
Mercedes-Benz	AMG-Mercedes CLK-DTM 2001	(Germany) HWA Team	5	(Germany) Uwe Alzen	All
Mercedes-Benz	AMG-Mercedes CLK-DTM 2001	(Germany) HWA Team	6	(Switzerland) Marcel Fässler	All
Mercedes-Benz	AMG-Mercedes CLK-DTM 2001	(Germany) Manthey Racing	9	(Germany) Bernd Mayländer	1-2, 6-10
Mercedes-Benz	AMG-Mercedes CLK-DTM 2001	(Germany) Manthey Racing	9	(Germany) Marcel Tiemann	3-5
Mercedes-Benz	AMG-Mercedes CLK-DTM 2001	(Germany) Manthey Racing	10	(Netherlands) Patrick Huisman	All
Mercedes-Benz	AMG-Mercedes CLK-DTM 2000	(Germany) Persson Motorsport	14	(Germany) Thomas Jäger	All
Mercedes-Benz	AMG-Mercedes CLK-DTM 2000	(Germany) Persson Motorsport	15	(Netherlands) Christijan Albers	All
Mercedes-Benz	AMG-Mercedes CLK-DTM 2000	(Germany) Team Rosberg	24	(Portugal) Pedro Lamy	1-2
Mercedes-Benz	AMG-Mercedes CLK-DTM 2000	(Germany) Team Rosberg	24	(Belgium) David Saelens	3-10
Mercedes-Benz	AMG-Mercedes CLK-DTM 2000	(Germany) Team Rosberg	42	(United Kingdom) Darren Turner	All
Opel	Opel Astra V8 Coupé 2001	(Germany) OPC Team Holzer	3	(Germany) Joachim Winkelhock	All
Opel	Opel Astra V8 Coupé 2001	(Germany) OPC Team Holzer	4	(Germany) Timo Scheider	All
Opel	Opel Astra V8 Coupé 2001	(Germany) OPC Team Holzer	11	(Germany) Michael Bartels	All
Opel	Opel Astra V8 Coupé 2001	(Germany) OPC Team Phoenix	7	(Germany) Manuel Reuter	All
Opel	Opel Astra V8 Coupé 2000	(Germany) OPC Team Phoenix	8	(Belgium) Yves Olivier	All
Opel	Opel Astra V8 Coupé 2000	(Italy) OPC Euroteam	16	(Switzerland) Alain Menu	All
Opel	Opel Astra V8 Coupé 2000	(Italy) OPC Euroteam	17	(Germany) Hubert Haupt	All
Opel	Opel Astra V8 Coupé 2000	(Germany) Mamerow Racing Team	20	(Germany) Peter Mamerow	All
Audi	Audi TT-R DTM 2001	(Germany) Team Abt Sportsline	18	(Germany) Christian Abt	All
Audi	Audi TT-R DTM 2001	(Germany) Team Abt Sportsline	19	(France) Laurent Aïello	1-3, 5-10
Audi	Audi TT-R DTM 2001	(Germany) Team Abt Sportsline	19	(Denmark) Kris Nissen	4
Audi	Audi TT-R DTM 2001	(Germany) Team Abt Sportsline Junior	22	(Sweden) Mattias Ekström	All
Audi	Audi TT-R DTM 2001	(Germany) Team Abt Sportsline Junior	23	(Germany) Martin Tomczyk	All

== Race calendar and winners ==
Two international rounds were added: A1-Ring in Austria and Zandvoort in the Netherlands. Each weekend comprised a 30 km qualifying race and a 100 km main race.

Round		Circuit	Date	Pole position	Fastest lap	Winning driver	Winning team	Winning manufacturer
1	QR	(Germany) Hockenheimring	22 April	(Germany) Bernd Schneider	(Germany) Bernd Schneider	(Germany) Bernd Schneider	D2 AMG Mercedes	Mercedes-Benz
1	CR	(Germany) Hockenheimring	22 April		(Germany) Bernd Schneider	(Germany) Bernd Schneider	D2 AMG Mercedes	Mercedes-Benz
2	QR	(Germany) Nürburgring	6 May	(France) Laurent Aïello	(Switzerland) Alain Menu	(France) Laurent Aïello	Team Abt Sportsline	Audi
2	CR	(Germany) Nürburgring	6 May		(Germany) Martin Tomczyk	(France) Laurent Aïello	Team Abt Sportsline	Audi
3	QR	(Germany) Oschersleben	20 May	(Switzerland) Marcel Fässler	(Switzerland) Marcel Fässler	(Switzerland) Marcel Fässler	Warsteiner AMG Mercedes	Mercedes-Benz
3	CR	(Germany) Oschersleben	20 May		(Germany) Bernd Schneider	(Switzerland) Marcel Fässler	Warsteiner AMG Mercedes	Mercedes-Benz
4	QR	(Germany) Sachsenring	17 June	(United Kingdom) Peter Dumbreck	(Germany) Christian Abt	(United Kingdom) Peter Dumbreck	D2 AMG Mercedes	Mercedes-Benz
4	CR	(Germany) Sachsenring	17 June		(Germany) Christian Abt	(Germany) Bernd Schneider	D2 AMG Mercedes	Mercedes-Benz
5	QR	(Germany) Norisring	8 July	(Germany) Bernd Schneider	(Switzerland) Marcel Fässler	(Germany) Bernd Schneider	D2 AMG Mercedes	Mercedes-Benz
5	CR	(Germany) Norisring	8 July		(Germany) Bernd Schneider	(Germany) Uwe Alzen	Warsteiner AMG Mercedes	Mercedes-Benz
6	QR	(Germany) Lausitzring	12 August	(Germany) Uwe Alzen	(Germany) Christian Abt	(Germany) Uwe Alzen	Warsteiner AMG Mercedes	Mercedes-Benz
6	CR	(Germany) Lausitzring	12 August		(France) Laurent Aïello	(United Kingdom) Peter Dumbreck	D2 AMG Mercedes	Mercedes-Benz
7	QR	(Germany) Nürburgring	26 August	(France) Laurent Aïello	(France) Laurent Aïello	(France) Laurent Aïello	Team Abt Sportsline	Audi
7	CR	(Germany) Nürburgring	26 August		(Germany) Bernd Schneider	(France) Laurent Aïello	Team Abt Sportsline	Audi
8	QR	(Austria) A1-Ring	9 September	(Germany) Bernd Schneider	(Germany) Bernd Schneider	(Germany) Bernd Schneider	D2 AMG Mercedes	Mercedes-Benz
8	CR	(Austria) A1-Ring	9 September		(Germany) Bernd Schneider	(Germany) Bernd Schneider	D2 AMG Mercedes	Mercedes-Benz
9	QR	(Netherlands) Zandvoort	23 September	(Germany) Christian Abt	(Germany) Christian Abt	(Germany) Christian Abt	Team Abt Sportsline	Audi
9	CR	(Netherlands) Zandvoort	23 September		(Germany) Christian Abt	(Germany) Uwe Alzen	Warsteiner AMG Mercedes	Mercedes-Benz
10	QR	(Germany) Hockenheimring	7 October	(Germany) Michael Bartels	(Netherlands) Patrick Huisman	(Netherlands) Patrick Huisman	Eschmann AMG Mercedes	Mercedes-Benz
10	CR	(Germany) Hockenheimring	7 October		(Germany) Bernd Mayländer	(Germany) Bernd Mayländer	Eschmann AMG Mercedes	Mercedes-Benz

== Drivers' Championship ==
Scoring system

Each round featured a "Qualifying Race", and the "Main Race".

- In the "Qualifying Race", the top 3 finishers were awarded points as follows;

Position	**1st**	**2nd**	**3rd**
Points	3	2	1

- In the "Main Race", the top 6 finishers were awarded points as follows;

Position	**1st**	**2nd**	**3rd**	**4th**	**5th**	**6th**	**7th**	**8th**	**9th**	**10th**
Points	20	15	12	10	8	6	4	3	2	1

Pos	Driver	HOC1 (Germany)		NÜR1 (Germany)		OSC (Germany)		SAC (Germany)		NOR (Germany)		LAU (Germany)		NÜR2 (Germany)		A1R (Austria)		ZAN (Netherlands)		HOC2 (Germany)		Pts
Pos	Driver	QR	CR	QR	CR	QR	CR	QR	CR	QR	CR	QR	CR	QR	CR	QR	CR	QR	CR	QR	CR	Pts
1	(Germany) Bernd Schneider	**1**	**1**	6	2	3	2	4	1	**1**	**2**	3	2	4	6	**1**	**1**	10	3	Ret	3	161
2	(Germany) Uwe Alzen	5	4	7	19	4	3	11	Ret	2	1	**1**	**Ret**	2	2	3	3	7	1	7	7	101
3	(United Kingdom) Peter Dumbreck	2	3	3	8	5	4	**1**	**6**	7	5	4	1	Ret	DNS	2	Ret	3	7	3	2	88
4	(Switzerland) Marcel Fässler	7	2	8	5	**1**	**1**	6	8	4	Ret	2	8	7	Ret	7	6	6	5	Ret	5	76
5	(France) Laurent Aïello	8	7	**1**	**1**	2	5			10	12	6	12	**1**	**1**	4	2	5	Ret	Ret	DNS	75
6	(Netherlands) Patrick Huisman	16	Ret	12	7	7	9	5	3	Ret	7	Ret	5	10	3	12	5	4	4	1	**18**	63
7	(Germany) Thomas Jäger	3	5	4	3	9	10	14	13	20	DNS	7	4	Ret	4	Ret	DNS	12	12	12	10	43
8	(Sweden) Mattias Ekström	17	DNS	10	9	6	7	2	5	11	9	Ret	3	6	14	Ret	11	2	Ret	6	6	38
9	(Germany) Manuel Reuter	12	12	Ret	DNS	13	15	8	14	15	8	13	7	12	5	13	4	9	13	11	4	35
10	(Germany) Christian Abt	10	10	NC	Ret	8	6	3	9	5	17	5	18	3	DSQ	18	DNS	**1**	**2**	8	11	29
11	(Germany) Bernd Mayländer	9	9	11	20							8	13	5	7	9	Ret	Ret	DNS	2	1	28
12	(Germany) Marcel Tiemann					12	8	7	4	3	3											26
13	(Germany) Martin Tomczyk	20	Ret	2	4	10	Ret	21†	7	16	10	Ret	6	9	Ret	6	Ret	16	Ret	Ret	16	23
14	(Netherlands) Christijan Albers	13	13	13	12	11	11	16	2	13	16	12	16	8	9	11	Ret	8	Ret	14	9	19
15	(United Kingdom) Darren Turner	6	8	9	16	14	DSQ	9	Ret	Ret	11	10	9	Ret	8	14	10	15	8	9	8	15
16	(Germany) Joachim Winkelhock	Ret	DNS	19	13	21	17	15	Ret	6	4	Ret	14	16	13	16	9	Ret	DNS	Ret	DNS	12
17	(Portugal) Pedro Lamy	4	6	5	6																	12
18	(Germany) Michael Bartels	14	Ret	20	14	17	14	17	10	8	6	14	Ret	14	11	8	Ret	18	10	**4**	12	8
19	(Germany) Timo Scheider	15	11	16	10	18	12	13	12	9	Ret	9	11	11	Ret	Ret	DNS	13	6	5	Ret	7
20	(Germany) Hubert Haupt	18	15	15	15	20	18	10	Ret	17	Ret	15	15	17	16	17	7	17	15	Ret	13	4
21	(Belgium) David Saelens					19	19†	12	11	12	13	16	10	13	10	10	Ret	11	9	13	15	4
22	(Belgium) Yves Olivier	19	14	14	11	15	13	18	Ret	14	Ret	17	Ret	15	Ret	15	8	19	14	16	Ret	3
23	(Switzerland) Alain Menu	11	Ret	17	17	16	16	22†	Ret	18	14	11	19	Ret	12	5	Ret	14	11	10	14	0
24	(Germany) Peter Mamerow	21	16	18	18	Ret	Ret	20	Ret	19	15	18	17	18	15	Ret	DNS	20	Ret	15	17	0
25	(Denmark) Kris Nissen							19	Ret													0
Pos	Driver	QR	CR	QR	CR	QR	CR	QR	CR	QR	CR	QR	CR	QR	CR	QR	CR	QR	CR	QR	CR	Pts
Pos	Driver	HOC1 (Germany)		NÜR1 (Germany)		OSC (Germany)		SAC (Germany)		NOR (Germany)		LAU (Germany)		NÜR2 (Germany)		A1R (Austria)		ZAN (Netherlands)		HOC2 (Germany)		Pts

Colour	Result
Gold	Winner
Silver	Second place
Bronze	Third place
Green	Points classification
Blue	Non-points classification
Blue	Non-classified finish (NC)
Purple	Retired, not classified (Ret)
Red	Did not qualify (DNQ)
Red	Did not pre-qualify (DNPQ)
Black	Disqualified (DSQ)
White	Did not start (DNS)
White	Withdrew (WD)
White	Race cancelled (C)
Blank	Did not practice (DNP)
Blank	Did not arrive (DNA)
Blank	Excluded (EX)

**Bold** – Pole
Italics – Fastest Lap

- † — Driver retired, but was classified as they completed 90% of the winner's race distance.

=== Teams' championship ===
Pos	Team	Car No.	HOC1 (Germany)		NÜR1 (Germany)		OSC (Germany)		SAC (Germany)		NOR (Germany)		LAU (Germany)		NÜR2 (Germany)		A1R (Austria)		ZAN (Netherlands)		HOC2 (Germany)		Pts
Pos	Team	Car No.	QR	CR	QR	CR	QR	CR	QR	CR	QR	CR	QR	CR	QR	CR	QR	CR	QR	CR	QR	CR	Pts
1	D2 AMG Mercedes	1	**1**	**1**	6	2	3	2	4	1	**1**	**2**	3	2	4	6	**1**	**1**	10	3	Ret	3	249
1	D2 AMG Mercedes	2	2	3	3	8	5	4	**1**	**6**	7	5	4	1	Ret	DNS	2	Ret	3	7	3	2	249
2	Warsteiner AMG Mercedes	5	5	4	7	19	4	3	11	Ret	2	1	**1**	**Ret**	2	2	3	3	7	1	7	7	177
2	Warsteiner AMG Mercedes	6	7	2	8	5	**1**	**1**	6	8	4	Ret	2	8	7	Ret	7	6	6	5	Ret	5	177
3	Eschmann AMG Mercedes	9	9	9	11	20	12	8	7	4	3	3	8	13	5	7	9	Ret	Ret	DNS	2	1	117
3	Eschmann AMG Mercedes	10	16	Ret	12	7	7	9	5	3	Ret	7	Ret	5	10	3	12	5	4	4	1	**18**	117
4	Team Abt Sportsline	18	10	10	NC	Ret	8	6	3	9	5	17	5	18	3	DSQ	18	DNS	**1**	**2**	8	11	104
4	Team Abt Sportsline	19	8	7	**1**	**1**	2	5	19	Ret	10	12	6	12	**1**	**1**	4	2	5	Ret	Ret	DNS	104
5	Original-Teile AMG Mercedes	14	3	5	4	3	9	10	14	13	20	DNS	7	4	Ret	4	Ret	DNS	12	12	12	10	62
5	Original-Teile AMG Mercedes	15	13	13	13	12	11	11	16	2	13	16	12	16	8	9	11	Ret	8	Ret	14	9	62
6	Abt Sportsline Junior	22	17	DNS	10	9	6	7	2	5	11	9	Ret	3	6	14	Ret	11	2	Ret	6	6	61
6	Abt Sportsline Junior	23	20	Ret	2	4	10	Ret	21†	7	16	10	Ret	6	9	Ret	6	Ret	16	Ret	Ret	16	61
7	OPC Team Phoenix	7	12	12	Ret	DNS	13	15	8	14	15	8	13	7	12	5	13	4	9	13	11	4	38
7	OPC Team Phoenix	8	19	14	14	11	15	13	18	Ret	14	Ret	17	Ret	15	Ret	15	8	19	14	16	Ret	38
8	Service 24h AMG Mercedes	24	4	6	5	6	19	19†	12	11	12	13	16	10	13	10	10	Ret	11	9	13	15	31
8	Service 24h AMG Mercedes	42	6	8	9	16	14	DSQ	9	Ret	Ret	11	10	9	Ret	8	14	10	15	8	9	8	31
9	OPC Team Holzer 1	3	Ret	DNS	19	13	21	17	15	Ret	6	4	Ret	14	16	13	16	9	Ret	DNS	Ret	DNS	19
9	OPC Team Holzer 1	4	15	11	16	10	18	12	13	12	9	Ret	9	11	11	Ret	Ret	DNS	13	6	5	Ret	19
10	OPC Team Holzer 2	11	14	Ret	20	14	17	14	17	10	8	6	14	Ret	14	11	8	Ret	18	10	**4**	12	8
11	OPC Euroteam	16	11	Ret	17	17	16	16	22†	Ret	18	14	11	19	Ret	12	5	Ret	14	11	10	14	4
11	OPC Euroteam	17	18	15	15	15	20	18	10	Ret	17	Ret	15	15	17	16	17	7	17	15	Ret	13	4
12	Mamerow Racing Team	20	21	16	18	18	Ret	Ret	20	Ret	19	15	18	17	18	15	Ret	DNS	20	Ret	15	17	0
Pos	Team	Car No.	QR	CR	QR	CR	QR	CR	QR	CR	QR	CR	QR	CR	QR	CR	QR	CR	QR	CR	QR	CR	Pts
Pos	Team	Car No.	HOC1 (Germany)		NÜR1 (Germany)		OSC (Germany)		SAC (Germany)		NOR (Germany)		LAU (Germany)		NÜR2 (Germany)		A1R (Austria)		ZAN (Netherlands)		HOC2 (Germany)		Pts

== Bibliography ==
- Voigt, Thomas (2001). Tourenwagen Story 2001: Die Rennen, die Fahrer, die Technik (in German). Berlin: Sportverlag Berlin. ISBN 978-3-328-00922-1.
