= Alain Menu =

Swiss racing driver (born 1963)

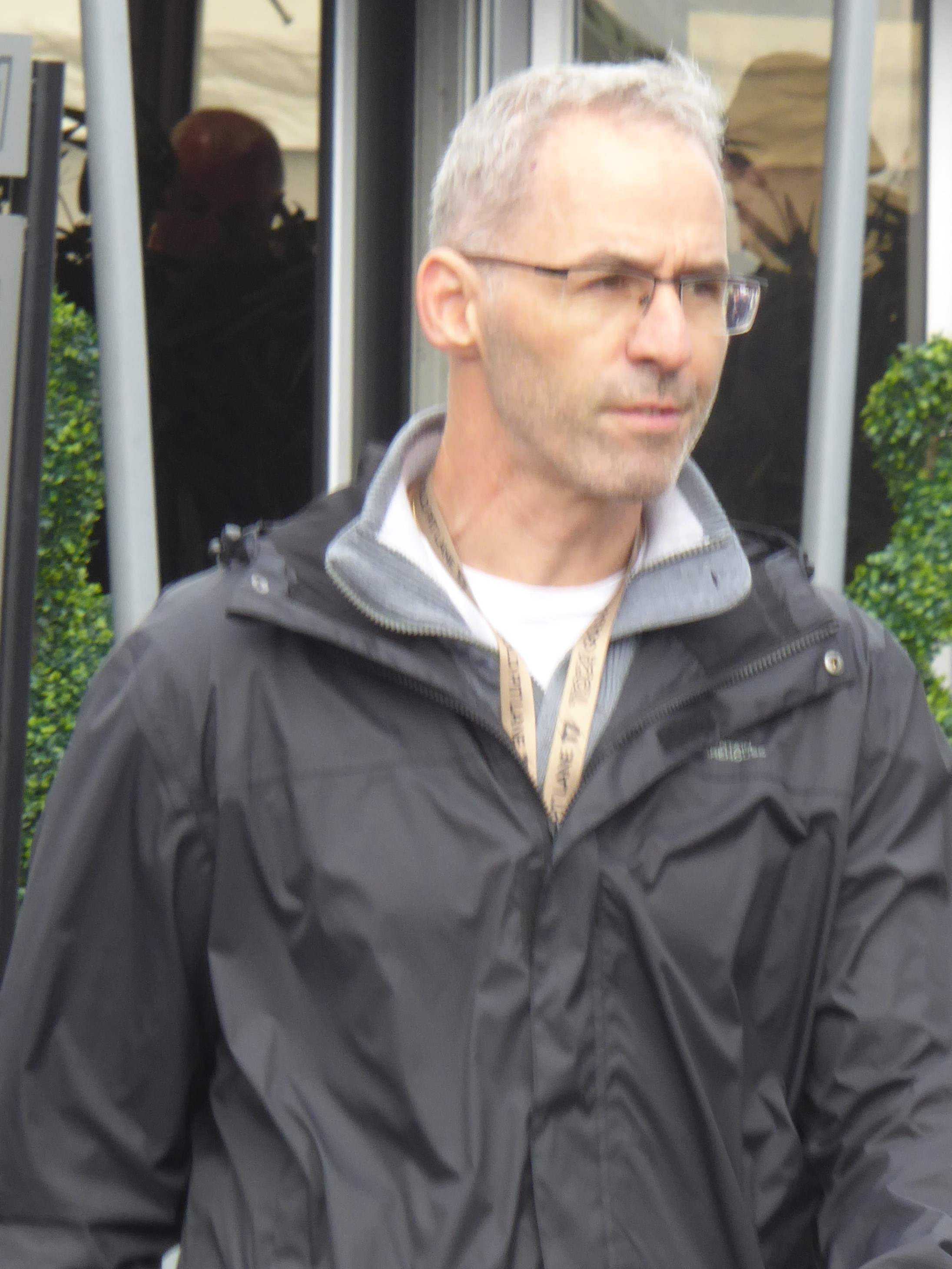
- Menu at the Knockhill round of the 2017 British Touring Car Championship.
- Nationality: (Switzerland) Swiss
- Born: 9 August 1963 (age 63) Geneva, Switzerland

British Touring Car Championship career
- Debut season: 1992
- Former teams: Team BMR RCIB Insurance; VX Racing; Ford Team Mondeo; Blend 37 Williams Renault; Renault Dealer Racing
- Starts: 229
- Wins: 36
- Poles: 28
- Fastest laps: 20
- Best finish: 1st in 1997, 2000

Previous series
- 2013 2008–11 2005–12 2004–06 2005 2004 2004 2004 2003 2002 2001 2000 2000 1999 1998 1997 1996 1995 1995 1994 1993 1992 1991 1991 1990 1990 1987–90: Porsche Supercup; TC2000; WTCC; TC2000; V8 Supercars; V8 Supercars; Porsche Carrera Cup GB; American Le Mans Series; DTM; DTM; DTM; V8 Supercars; BTCC; BTCC; BTCC; BTCC; BTCC; BTCC; Italian Superturismo; BTCC; BTCC; BTCC; DTM; International Formula 3000; International Formula 3000; British Formula 3000; British Formula 3 Championship

Championship titles
- 1997 2000: British Touring Car Championship; British Touring Car Championship

24 Hours of Le Mans career
- Years: 2002, 2004
- Teams: Prodrive Racing
- Best finish: 11th (2004)
- Class wins: 0

Alain Menu (born 9 August 1963) is a Swiss racing driver who is currently working for Team BMR as a driving coach. He was one of the most successful touring car drivers of the 1990s, winning the prestigious British Touring Car Championship twice (the only driver during the series' 1991–2000 Super Touring era to do so). He drove for Chevrolet in the World Touring Car Championship between 2005 and 2012 with a best finish of second in 2012.

== Biography ==
=== British Touring Car Championship ===
==== Team M Mobile (1992) ====
The son of a farmer, Menu was born in Geneva. Like many drivers who eventually build a career in touring cars, Menu began his career in single-seater racing, reaching the International Formula 3000 championship in 1991 after two years in the British Formula 3 Championship and one year in the British Formula 3000 Championship, in which he finished runner-up in 1990. However, for the next year he returned to Great Britain to race a BMW 3 Series in the British Touring Car Championship (BTCC), showing promise before being injured mid-season in a quadbike accident at Knockhill; despite only participating in half of the season, he still managed to finish ninth in the final championship standings. As a result of this accident, he was unable to jog for exercise again – he instead took up cycling as his main exercise.

==== Renault (1993–1998) ====
In 1993, Menu began a six-year association with Renault in the BTCC, who had just entered the series with the GB Motorsport run Renault 19. He finished second in a very wet round two at Donington Park behind teammate Tim Harvey. At the next round at Oulton Park, he crashed out of fifth place late on in the race. Menu collided with Nissan Primera of Tiff Needell on the final lap of round eight at Silverstone, dropping Menu for seventh to eighth and forcing Needell into the pits. The Renault team missed the double header at Knockhill and returned to the grid for round ten at Oulton Park. The car had been revised and Menu was sixth after the first few corners having started eighth; he went on to finish fourth behind John Cleland. The first year of their partnership was not particularly successful, with the 19 little better than a midfield runner in the hands of Menu and reigning champion Tim Harvey. However, Menu did manage to win one race at a rain-soaked Donington Park late in the season.

Menu driving for Renault in the 1994 British Touring Car Championship.

For 1994, the 19 was replaced by the Renault Laguna, which proved to be a much better package all-round. Alfa Romeo had dominated the first four races and Menu did not finish on the podium until Silverstone. At Oulton Park, Alfa Romeo were told to run their cars without their disputed aerodynamic aids and they left the circuit in protest. This allowed Menu to win the race from pole position and set fastest lap. He collided with Julian Bailey at the first corner of the British Grand Prix support race at Silverstone, triggering a pileup that red flagged the race. He took pole position for round fifteen at Oulton Park by nearly a second over BMW driver Joachim Winkelhock but made a poor start and finished third. Menu scored four further podiums in the last four races to finish second in the championship behind Gabriele Tarquini.

Menu driving for Renault in the 1995 British Touring Car Championship.

The running of the Renault team was taken over by Williams F1 for the 1995 season, and Menu was joined by former Toyota driver Will Hoy. Despite relatively little testing, Menu qualified third for the season opener at Donington Park and went on to finish second in the race. He took pole position for the first race at Thruxton and held on to take a narrow victory over Cleland. Menu was running third in round seven at Silverstone when he was forced to retire with mechanical issues but he was able to take part in the second race of the day and he finished fourth. Third place in round nine at Oulton Park was the start of five successive mid-season podiums that kept him second in the championship behind Rickard Rydell and then Cleland. Menu was third in the championship after round 21 at Snetterton but three consecutive wins finished the year and elevated him back up to second in the standings.

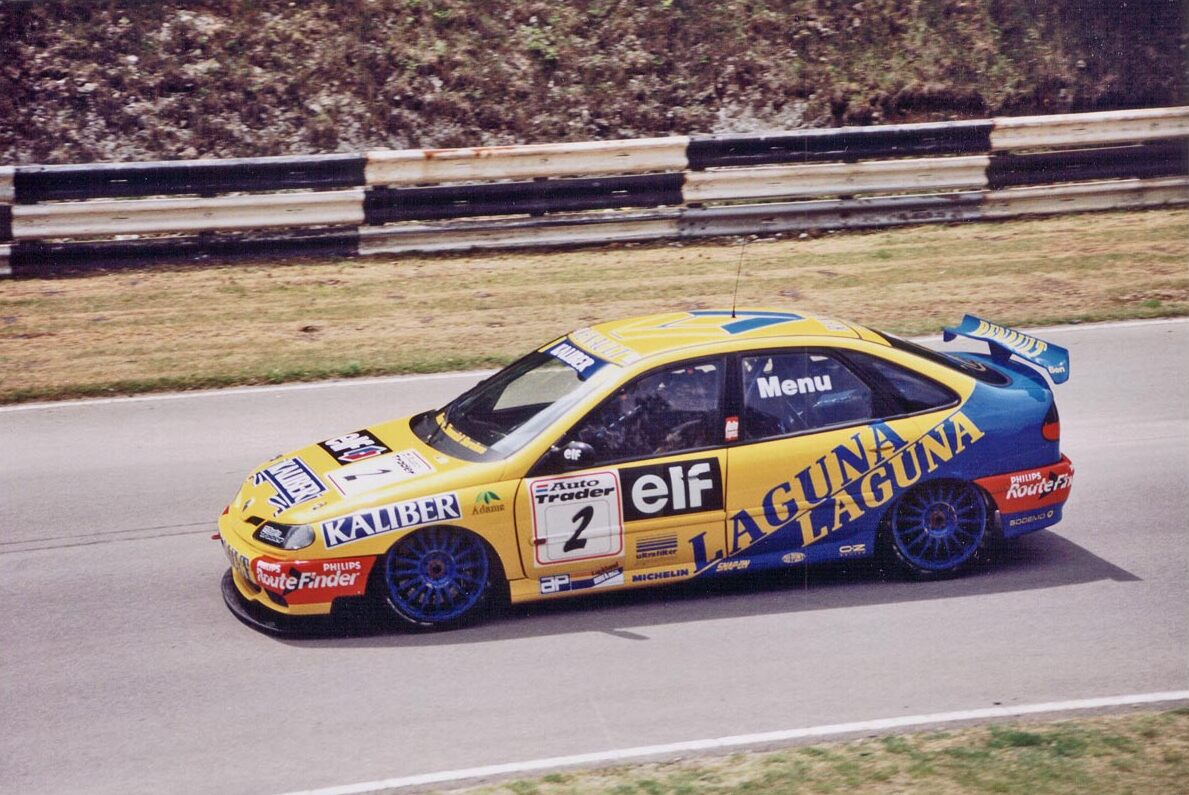
Menu driving for Renault in the 1996 British Touring Car Championship season.

Menu was partnered with Hoy once again in 1996. The main rival for the Renault team was Audi Sport UK and their 4-wheel drive car, driven by Frank Biela. The season opener at Donington Park saw Menu finish third behind teammate Hoy and Biela. Menu had to start the second race of the day from the back of the grid having failed the ride height check after race one. He recovered to seventh before having to retire with mechanical problems. Menu took pole position for the next event at Brands Hatch, but was demoted to second at the start by Biela and those positions stuck until the finish line. The next event at Thruxton saw Menu spin at Church corner in race one and ditch his car into the nearby woodland, he was unhurt but the damage left him on the sidelines for race two. Menu worked his way up into the lead of race one at Snetterton but almost immediately slowed down with car problems and retired. He took the first win of the year for Renault in the next meeting at Brands Hatch, winning both races. After this, Menu won twice more on his way to second in the championship, 92 points shy of champion Frank Biela.

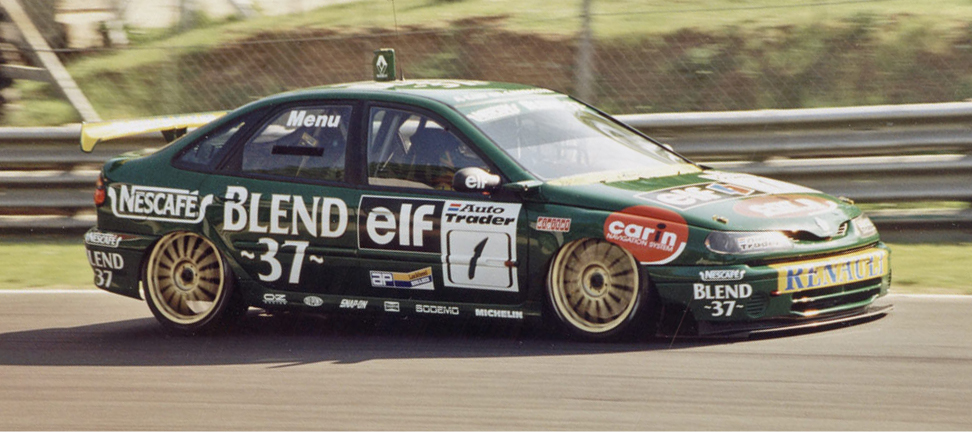
Menu driving for Renault in the 1998 British Touring Car Championship season.

Menu continued with Renault in 1997 and was joined by Renault Spider champion Jason Plato. The car was much more competitive for that year and Menu won the first four races of the season. Rounds five and six at Thruxton took place in wet conditions and the Renaults front row lock-out translated into two third-placed finishes for Menu. He was nudged into a spin in round eight at Brands Hatch by Anthony Reid's Nissan, but was able to rejoin the race and finish fourth while Reid finished fourteenth. Menu started on pole for a wet round eleven at Donington Park, although the two Audis got a better start and led into the first corner. Menu was able to cleanly retake second from John Bintcliffe, despite a misted up windscreen. Contact with James Thompson at Knockhill meant Menu retired for the first and only time that season. Just before round 19 at Thruxton, Menu pulled into the pits to fix a broken rear wheel, which meant he missed the start and he finished in a non–points classified finish for the first time that year. After the second race at Thruxton, Menu had secured the championship crown and so on the final lap of round 21 at Brands Hatch, Menu let teammate Plato through into second place to allow him to close in on Biela in the championship. Menu had taken twelve wins in a dominant car in 1997, a record that was later equalled by Ashley Sutton 26 years later.

1998 would see the Renault team have a large amount of sponsorship from Nescafe, and Menu was once again partnered by Plato. The Renault Laguna was not as dominant as the previous season and Menu won only three races, the first which came at Thruxton in the second race of the year.

==== Ford (1999–2000) ====
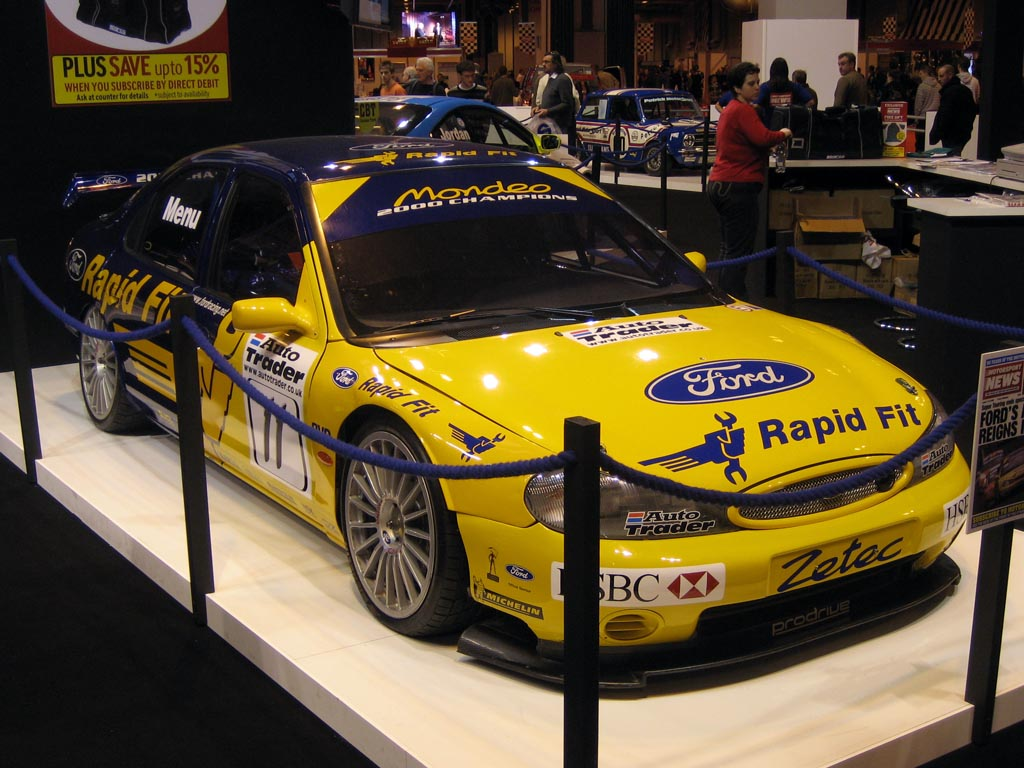
Menu's title winning Mondeo from 2000

Menu switched to Ford in 1999 with 1998 championship runner-up Anthony Reid leaving Nissan. The Ford Mondeo was not successful in 1999 and Menu finished 11th in the championship with one win at Knockhill. Menu would win his second title in 2000 against team-mates Anthony Reid and Rickard Rydell. He would be the last driver to win the BTCC title in a Ford until Ash Sutton 23 years later.

2000 was to be the last year of the BTCC in that form; the championship had been gradually in decline and losing entrants since 1998, with 2000 only featuring three works teams and 12 championship contenders, as opposed to the nine teams and 20+ championship contenders in 1995. The championship was reformed for 2001 with new regulations, but only two manufacturers committed to the series, and Menu, like most of the star drivers, chose to leave the series.

==== VX Racing (2007) ====
On 4 October 2007, it was announced that Menu would make a one-off return to the BTCC with which he is most closely associated. He drove a Vauxhall Vectra for VX Racing at the final round of the 2007 BTCC season at Thruxton to assist Fabrizio Giovanardi in his successful title bid.

==== Team BMR (2014–2015) ====
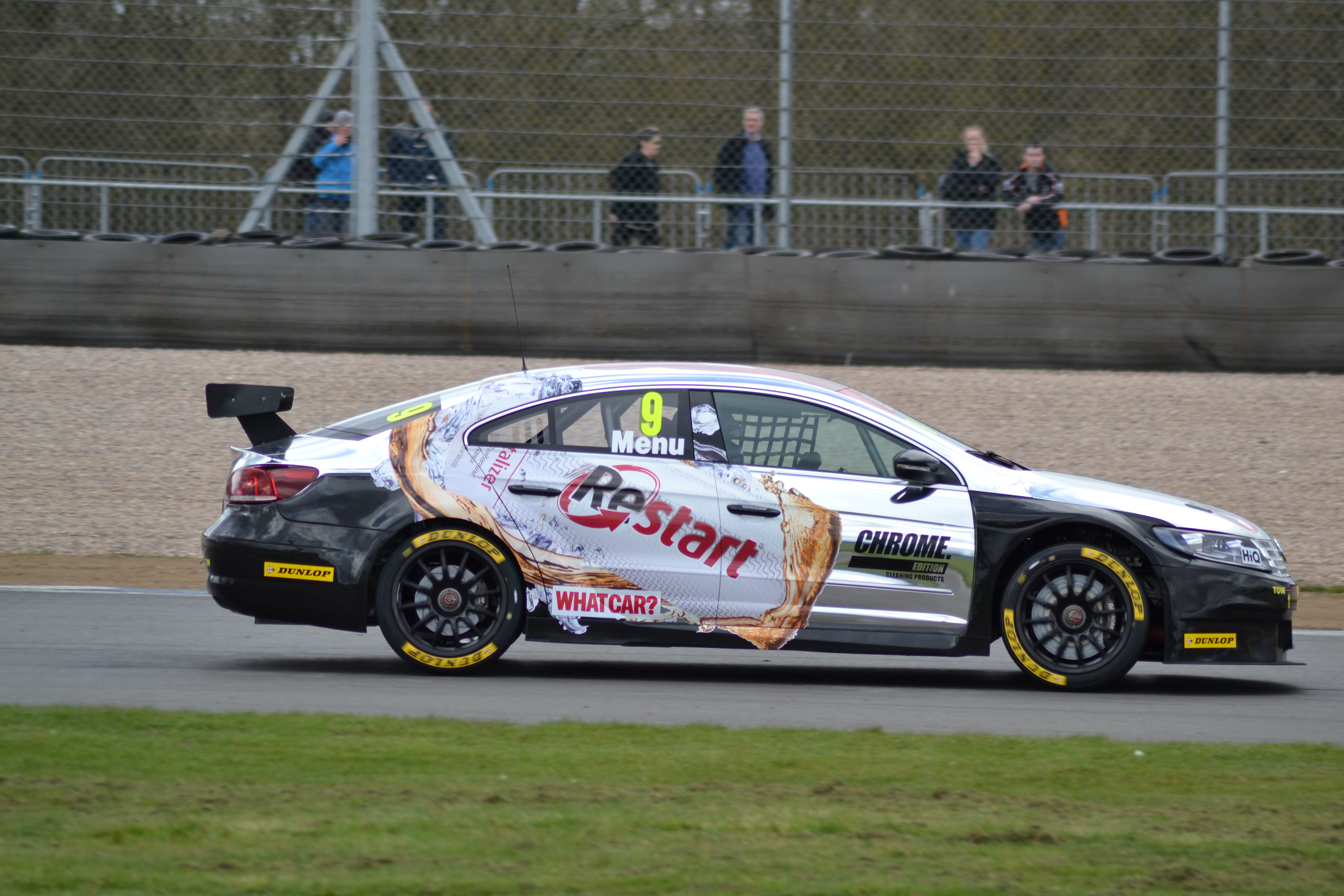
Menu driving the Team BMR Volkswagen CC at Donington Park during the 2014 British Touring Car Championship season.

On 27 January 2014, it was announced that Menu would return to the BTCC, driving a Volkswagen CC for Team BMR. Menu struggled to find the ideal set up in the new breed NGTC Touring Car. He finished tenth in the standings with a pair of podium finishes, second at Rockingham and third at Silverstone.

As of 2015, Menu is no longer a driver for Team BMR, however he remained on the team's roster as a driver coach, helping to train those involved in the British Touring Car Championship, Renault Clio Cup and Ginetta Junior Championship, but he refused to rule out driving for the team again later in the year.

=== DTM ===
From 2001 to 2003, Menu raced for Opel in the Deutsche Tourenwagen Masters, a high-tech touring car series based in Germany. However, he achieved little success (Menu would describe his DTM years as "not very good" in a 2004 interview). While competing in the DTM, he ventured into sports car racing with Prodrive, competing in both the Le Mans 24 Hours and the Sebring 12 Hours as well as winning one race each in both the FIA GT Championship and the American Le Mans Series.

=== World Touring Car Championship ===
==== Chevrolet (2005–2012) ====
In 2004, Menu announced his return to production-based touring car racing, with the fledgling Chevrolet team, RML in the 2005 World Touring Car Championship season. Menu, and his equally highly regarded team-mate Nicola Larini, did not expect to win races in their first year but the team's performance was still seen as a big disappointment, Menu only achieving three points finishes, his best result being a 6th at Spa-Francorchamps.

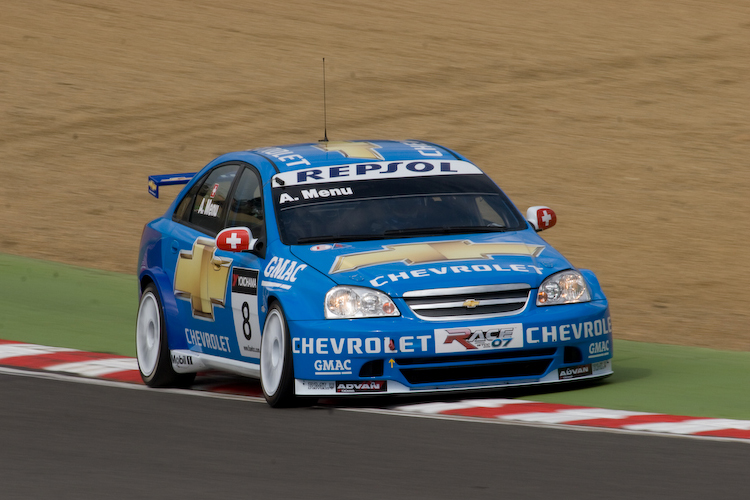
Menu driving the Chevrolet Lacetti WTCC car at Brands Hatch in 2008.

The team had expected to make progress up the grid in 2006, and their faith was fulfilled at a very wet Brands Hatch on 21 May when Menu won the second race of the day, scoring Chevrolet's first-ever outright win in a FIA-accredited world championship event.

Chevrolet introduced the new Cruze model to the championship for 2009. Menu crashed out of the first race of the season at the Race of Brazil after the collision with BMW pair Andy Priaulx and Jörg Müller. At the Race of Morocco, he had originally qualified second but was demoted to tenth by the stewards after his car did not restart following a mandatory visit to the weighing bay after the second phase of qualifying. He was caught up in a race one incident with Jorg Müller and Rickard Rydell which put Rydell out of the race with damage. The Race of France saw Menu take his first win in the Chevrolet Cruze having started on the reversed grid pole for race two and winning the race from there. Menu collided with Augusto Farfus in race one of the Race of Portugal with Menu being spun into the wall. Menu's teammate Larini tagged Tiago Monteiro while the pair tried to avoid the wreckage but Mehdi Bennani collided with the stationary Chevrolet, the track was then blocked and the race red flagged. Menu took pole position at the following event, the Race of UK at Brands Hatch. Having swapped places throughout the race with teammate Huff, Menu won the race to take his second win of the year. During the final qualifying session of the year for the Race of Macau, Yvan Muller lost control on cement dust that had been laid on the track following an earlier accident for James Thompson. Tarquini hit Muller's car, and the SEAT Sport pair were then hit by Menu. He finished the season tenth in the drivers' championship behind fifth placed Huff.

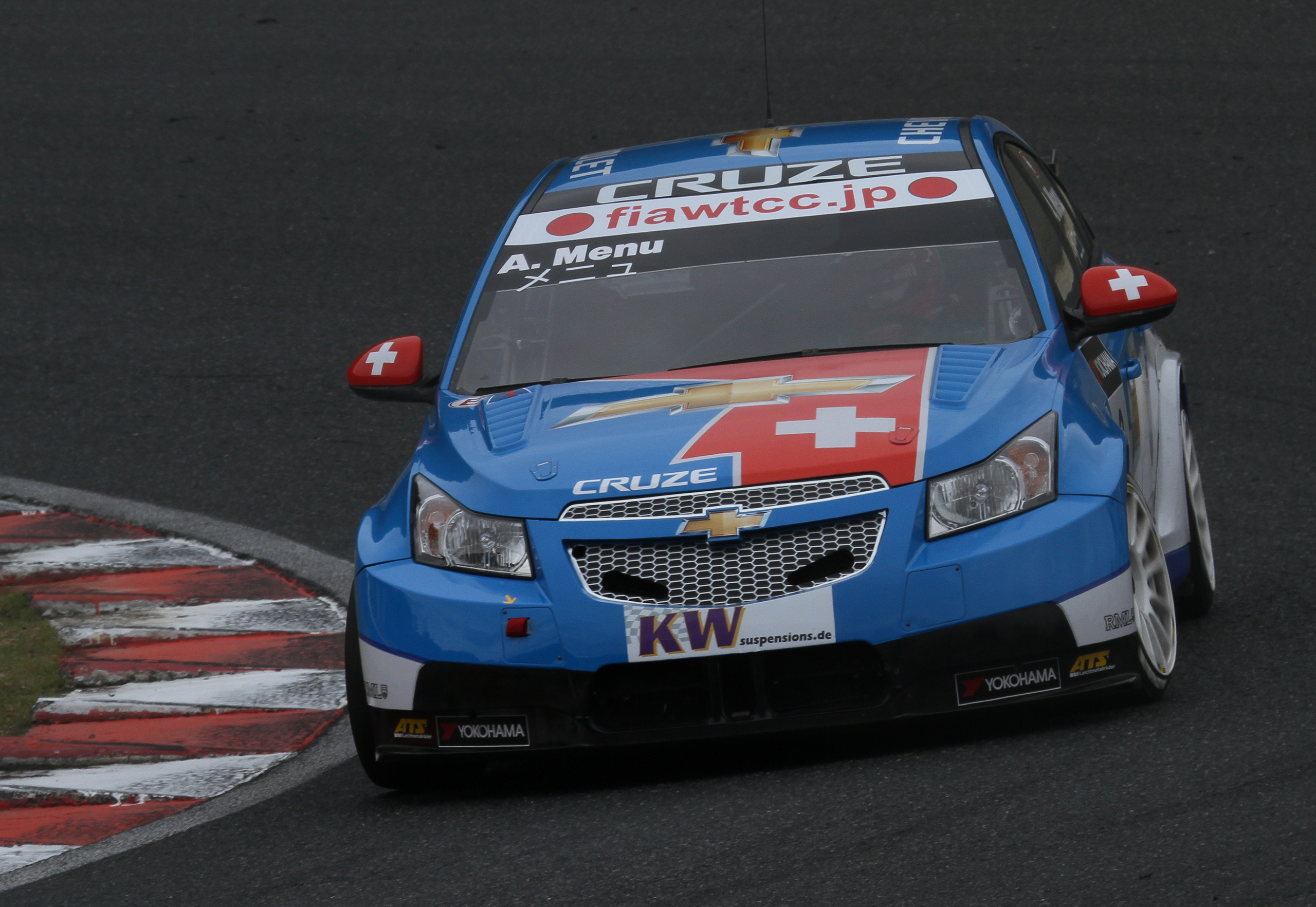
Menu driving for Chevrolet at the 2010 FIA WTCC Race of Japan.

Menu stayed with Chevrolet for the 2010 season, joined by Huff and new teammate Yvan Muller. Menu brought out the red flags during qualifying for the Race of Morocco when he crashed into the wall during Q1. He came into contact with the wall again during race two when he tangled with BMW Team RBM driver Augusto Farfus. Having been passed by eBay Motors driver Colin Turkington near the end of the race one of the Race of UK, Menu dropped down the order to benefit from the reversed grid for race two. He started on the front row but damaged his steering trying to pass Farfus which put an end to his race. He won only one race in 2010, the first race of the Race of Germany and he finished the year sixth in the standings, three places and 103 points down on teammate Huff while Muller was champion.

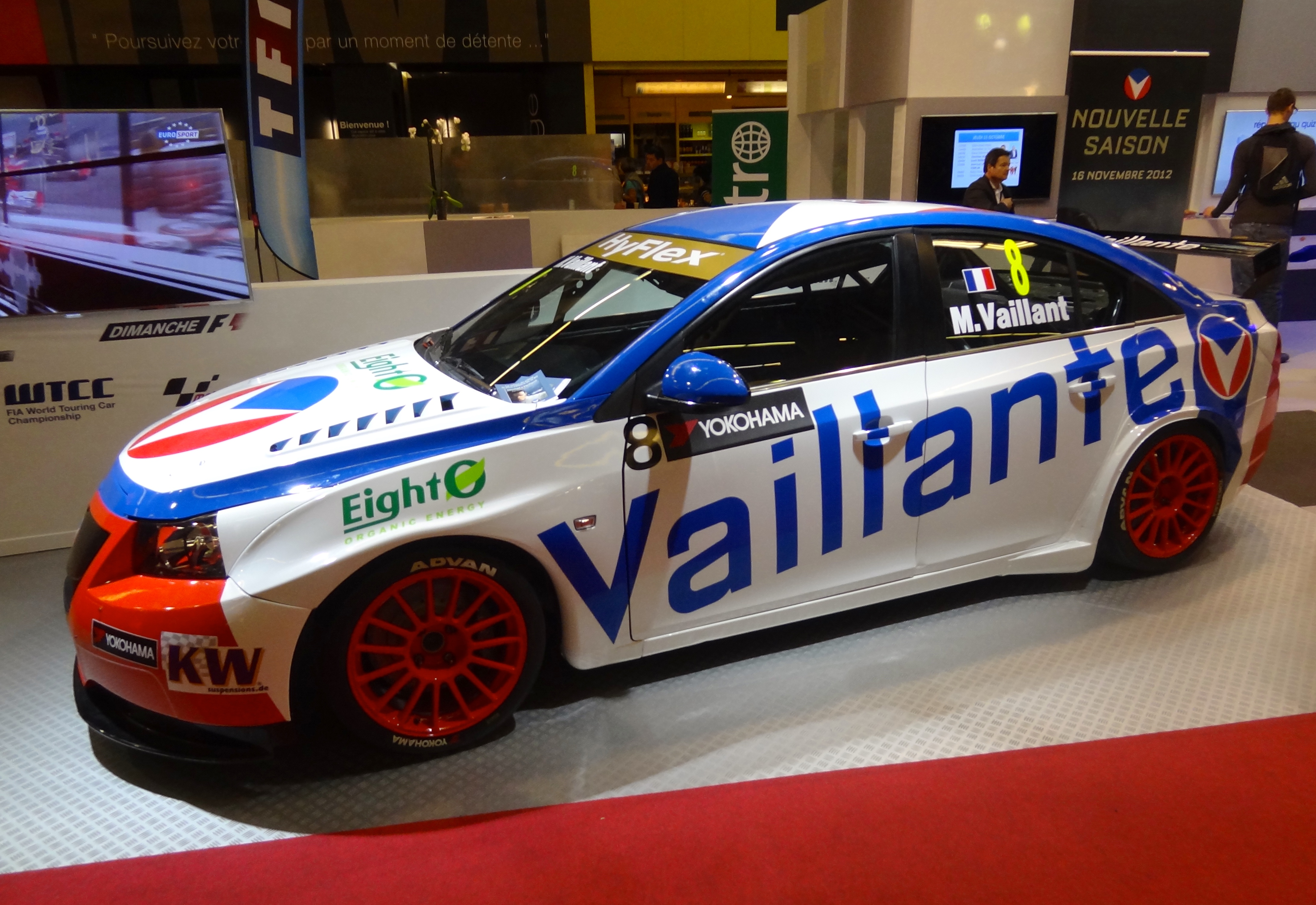
Menu's Michel Vaillant color Cruze 1.6T for the 2012 Race of Portugal where Menu won race two of the event as Vaillant.

Menu continued with Chevrolet for 2012. Muller had won the first three races of the season but Menu broke this streak by winning the second race of the Race of Spain, despite going through a gravel trap after encountering oil on the circuit. He took his first pole position of the season at the Race of Morocco and won the first race of the day. Menu was running third in the second race of the Race of Slovakia until he dropped down the order and retired with a broken rim. The second race of the Race of Hungary saw Menu pull away from his teammates to chase down race leader and eventual winner Norbert Michelisz to close in on his teammates in the championship. While running third in race two of the Race of Austria, he suffered a puncture and a high speed collision with the barriers ensued in the final sector of the lap. A similar specification Chevrolet Cruze of bamboo-engineering's Alex MacDowall also had a left front puncture and came to rest in the gravel trap in close proximity to Menu's stranded car. He took up the role of comic book character Michel Vaillant for the Race of Portugal. His Chevrolet Cruze raced in special Vaillante colours and he wore a special race suit and dyed his hair to look like the French comic book racer.

Menu began a run of three successive pole positions at the Race of United States, but he retired from the first race with power steering issues. He led a Chevrolet 1–2–3 from pole in the opening race of the Race of Japan and led from start to finish in race one of the Race of China. Menu was pushed into a half spin by teammate Muller in the second race while leading, allowing Huff to go through and win. Muller finished second and Menu finished third but a post race thirty-second penalty saw Muller drop to thirteenth in the classification and Menu was elevated to second in the championship. Menu won the final race of the year at Macau and secured his best overall result in the WTCC with second in the drivers' championship, twelve points shy of Huff.

Prior to the Race of Brazil, Chevrolet announced they were ending their WTCC programme, leaving their drivers without seats for 2013.

=== Porsche Supercup ===
Having been unable to find a seat in the WTCC, Menu moved to the Porsche Supercup for the 2013 season, driving for team FACH Auto Tech. Some sources stated that FACH Auto Tech is Menu's own team, but he declared that it is not true. With the main sponsor of the team not supplying funds, Menu only completed one race of the season.

=== Other activities ===
At the end of the 1995 season, Renault entered Menu and Hoy into the final round of the 1995 Italian Superturismo Championship. Alain qualified third, the best of the non-Audi entrants, but the engine stalled at the start for both Laguna drivers, blamed on a new Magneti Marelli system for that round. Despite fighting back up to fifth, the engine failed, resulting in retirement from Race 1 and a DNS for Race 2.

A few days later came the 1995 FIA Touring Car World Cup at Paul Ricard. Menu qualified seventh for Race 1, the only non-Audi or BMW in the top-nine. He ran third in the race before retiring with a mechanical issue and finished fifth in Race 2..

In 2006, Menu won the 200 km de Buenos Aires, a round of Argentina's TC2000 championship, with Matias Rossi driving a Chevrolet Astra.

In a 2005 poll by readers of Motorsport Magazine, Menu was voted the fourth greatest touring car driver of all time.

== Career ==
- 2012: 2nd in World Touring Car Championship, 6 wins (Chevrolet Cruze)
- 2011: 3rd in World Touring Car Championship, 5 wins (Chevrolet Cruze)
- 2010: 6th in World Touring Car Championship, 1 win (Chevrolet Cruze)
- 2009: 10th in World Touring Car Championship, 2 wins (Chevrolet Cruze)
- 2008: 9th in World Touring Car Championship, 3 wins (Chevrolet Lacetti), 3rd "200 km de Buenos Aires" (TC2000)
- 2007: 6th in World Touring Car Championship, 5 wins (Chevrolet Lacetti)
- 2006: 15th in World Touring Car Championship, 1 win (Chevrolet Lacetti), won the "200 km de Buenos Aires" (TC2000)
- 2005: 16th in World Touring Car Championship (Chevrolet Lacetti)
- 2004: 4th in class, 11th overall at Le Mans 24 Hours (Ferrari 550 Maranello), 2nd, BTCC Masters Race, Donington Park
- 2003: 9th in Deutsche Tourenwagen Masters (Opel Astra), 1st in class at Petit Le Mans (Ferrari 550 Maranello)
- 2002: 9th in Deutsche Tourenwagen Masters (Opel Astra), DNF (engine) at Le Mans 24 Hours (Ferrari 550 Maranello)
- 2001: 21st in Deutsche Tourenwagen Masters (Opel Astra), 1 win in FIA GT Championship (Ferrari 550 Maranello)
- 2000: 1st in British Touring Car Championship, 6 wins (Ford Mondeo)
- 1999: 11th in British Touring Car Championship, 1 win (Ford Mondeo)
- 1998: 4th in British Touring Car Championship, 3 wins (Renault Laguna)
- 1997: 1st in British Touring Car Championship, 12 wins (Renault Laguna)
- 1996: 2nd in British Touring Car Championship, 4 wins (Renault Laguna)
- 1995: 2nd in British Touring Car Championship, 7 wins (Renault Laguna)
- 1994: 2nd in British Touring Car Championship, 2 wins (Renault Laguna)
- 1993: 10th in British Touring Car Championship, 1 win (Renault 19)
- 1992: 9th in British Touring Car Championship (BMW 3 Series) (only completed half-season)
- 1991: International Formula 3000 Championship
- 1990: 2nd in British Formula 3000 Championship
- 1989: British Formula 3 Championship
- 1988: British Formula 3 Championship
- 1987: 2nd in British Formula Ford 1600 Championship, 2nd in FF1600 Festival.
- 1985: French FF1600 Championship
- 1984: Enrolled at the Elf Winfield racing school in France.

== Racing record ==
=== Complete International Formula 3000 results ===
(key) (Races in bold indicate pole position) (Races in italics indicate fastest lap)

Year	Entrant	Chassis	Engine	1	2	3	4	5	6	7	8	9	10	11	Pos.	Pts
1990	CoBRa Motorsport	Reynard 90D	Mugen Honda	DON	SIL	PAU	JER	MNZ	PER	HOC	BRH	BIR	BUG	NOG; 12	NC	0
1991	CoBRa Motorsport	Reynard 91D	Ford Cosworth	VAL; 6	PAU; 6	JER; 18	MUG; 12	PER; Ret	HOC; DNS	BRH	SPA	BUG	NOG		16th	2

=== Complete Deutsche Tourenwagen Meisterschaft/Masters results ===
(key) (Races in bold indicate pole position) (Races in italics indicate fastest lap)

Year	Team	Car	1	2	3	4	5	6	7	8	9	10	11	12	13	14	15	16	17	18	19	20	21	22	23	24	Pos.	Pts
1991	Linder M Team	BMW M3 Sport Evo	ZOL; 1	ZOL; 2	HOC; 1	HOC; 2	NÜR; 1	NÜR; 2	AVU; 1	AVU; 2	WUN; 1	WUN; 2	NOR; 1	NOR; 2	DIE; 1	DIE; 2	NÜR; 1	NÜR; 2	ALE; 1; 19	ALE; 2; 14	HOC; 1; 15	HOC; 2; 16	BRN; 1	BRN; 2	DON; 1	DON; 2	NC	0
2001	OPC Euroteam	Opel Astra Coupé 2000	HOC; QR; 11	HOC; CR; Ret	NÜR; QR; 17	NÜR; CR; 17	OSC; QR; 16	OSC; CR; 16	SAC; QR; 22†	SAC; CR; Ret	NOR; QR; 18	NOR; CR; 14	LAU; QR; 11	LAU; CR; 19	NÜR; QR; Ret	NÜR; CR; 12	A1R; QR; 5	A1R; CR; Ret	ZAN; QR; 14	ZAN; CR; 11	HOC; QR; 10	HOC; CR; 14					23rd	0
2002	OPC Euroteam	Opel Astra Coupé 2001	HOC; QR; 17	HOC; CR; 9	ZOL; QR; 17	ZOL; CR; 14	DON; QR; 6	DON; CR; 8	SAC; QR; 2	SAC; CR; 3	NOR; QR; 14	NOR; CR; Ret	LAU; QR; 10	LAU; CR; 11	NÜR; QR; 7	NÜR; CR; Ret	A1R; QR; 7	A1R; CR; 6	ZAN; QR; 4	ZAN; CR; Ret	HOC; QR; 18†	HOC; CR; Ret					9th	7
2003	OPC Team Holzer	Opel Astra V8 Coupé 2003	HOC; 18	ADR; 8	NÜR; 6	LAU; 6	NOR; 10	DON; Ret	NÜR; 9	A1R; 7	ZAN; Ret	HOC; 10															9th	9

- † – Retired, but was classified as he completed 90% of the winner's race distance.

=== Complete British Touring Car Championship results ===
(key) Races in bold indicate pole position (1 point awarded – 1996–2000 all races, 2007 just for first race) Races in italics indicate fastest lap (1 point awarded – 2007 only) * signifies that driver lead race for at least one lap (1 point awarded – 1998–2000 just in feature race, 2007 all races)

Year	Team	Car	Class	1	2	3	4	5	6	7	8	9	10	11	12	13	14	15	16	17	18	19	20	21	22	23	24	25	26	27	28	29	30	DC	Pts
1992	Team M Mobil	BMW 318is		SIL; 1; 10	THR; 1; 6	OUL; 1; 6	SNE; 1; 3	BRH; 1 Ret	DON; 1 Ret	DON; 2 Ret	SIL; 1; 9	KNO; 1 DNS	KNO; 2 DNS	PEM; 1	BRH; 1	BRH; 2	DON; 1	SIL; 1																9th	27
1993	Renault Dealer Racing	Renault 19		SIL; 1; 10	DON; 1; 2	SNE; 1 Ret	DON; 1; 13	OUL; 1 Ret	BRH; 1; 15	BRH; 2 Ret	PEM; 1 Ret	SIL; 1; 8	KNO; 1	KNO; 2	OUL; 1; 4	BRH; 1; 9	THR; 1; 9	DON; 1; 2	DON; 2; 1	SIL; 1 Ret														10th	57
1994	Renault Dealer Racing	Renault Laguna		THR; 1; 6	BRH; 1; 18	BRH; 2 Ret	SNE; 1 Ret	**SIL**; **1**; 3	SIL; 2; 2	**OUL**; **1**; 1	DON; 1; 5	DON; 2; 4	BRH; 1; 9	BRH; 2; 6	SIL; 1; 5	KNO; 1; 1	**KNO**; **2**; 3	**OUL**; **1**; 2	BRH; 1; 7	BRH; 2; 7	SIL; 1; 3	SIL; 2; 2	DON; 1; 2	DON; 2; 2										**2nd**	**222**
1995	Williams Renault Dealer Racing	Renault Laguna		DON; 1; 2	DON; 2; 4	BRH; 1; 7	BRH; 2; 9	**THR**; **1**; 1	THR; 2; 2	SIL; 1 Ret	SIL; 2; 4	OUL; 1; 3	OUL; 2; 1	**BRH**; **1**; 1	**BRH**; **2**; 3	DON; 1; 3	DON; 2; 4	SIL; 1; 16	KNO; 1 Ret	KNO; 2; 1	BRH; 1; 4	BRH; 2; 18	SNE; 1 Ret	SNE; 2; 10	**OUL**; **1**; 1	**OUL**; **2**; 1	SIL; 1; 1	**SIL**; **2**; 2						**2nd**	**305**
1996	Williams Renault Dealer Racing	Renault Laguna		DON; 1; 3	DON; 2 Ret	**BRH**; **1**; 2	BRH; 2; 2	THR; 1 Ret	THR; 2 DNS	SIL; 1; 5	SIL; 2; 4	OUL; 1; 5	OUL; 2; 4	SNE; 1 Ret	SNE; 2; 3	**BRH**; **1**; 1	**BRH**; **2**; 1	SIL; 1; 6	SIL; 2; 5	KNO; 1; 9	KNO; 2 Ret	OUL; 1; 1	OUL; 2; 3	**THR**; **1** Ret	THR; 2; 4	DON; 1; 3	DON; 2; 2	BRH; 1; 1	BRH; 2; 4					**2nd**	**197**
1997	Williams Renault Dealer Racing	Renault Laguna		DON; 1; 1	DON; 2; 1	SIL; 1; 1	**SIL**; **2**; 1	**THR**; **1**; 3	**THR**; **2**; 3	**BRH**; **1**; 1	BRH; 2; 4	**OUL**; **1**; 1	**OUL**; **2**; 1	**DON**; **1**; 2	**DON**; **2**; 1	**CRO**; **1**; 1	**CRO**; **2**; 1	KNO; 1; 3	KNO; 2 Ret	**SNE**; **1**; 1	**SNE**; **2**; 2	THR; 1; 17	THR; 2; 2	BRH; 1; 3	BRH; 2; 3	SIL; 1; 1	**SIL**; **2**; 2							**1st**	**281**
1998	Blend 37 Williams Renault	Renault Laguna		THR; 1; 5	THR; 2; 1*	SIL; 1 Ret	SIL; 2 Ret	DON; 1; 4	DON; 2; 2	BRH; 1; 3	BRH; 2; 4	**OUL**; **1**; 1	OUL; 2; 4*	DON; 1 Ret	DON; 2 Ret	CRO; 1; 3	CRO; 2; 4	SNE; 1; 3	SNE; 2 Ret	THR; 1; 2	THR; 2; 1*	KNO; 1; 3	KNO; 2; 4	BRH; 1; 5	BRH; 2; 3	OUL; 1; 3	OUL; 2 Ret	SIL; 1; 9	SIL; 2 Ret					4th	187
1999	Ford Team Mondeo	Ford Mondeo		DON; 1; 2	DON; 2 Ret	SIL; 1; 13	SIL; 2 Ret	THR; 1 Ret	THR; 2; 6	**BRH**; **1**; 12	BRH; 2 Ret	OUL; 1; 3	OUL; 2 Ret	DON; 1; 5	DON; 2; 6	CRO; 1 Ret	CRO; 2 Ret	SNE; 1; 8	SNE; 2; 9*	THR; 1; 11	THR; 2; 3	KNO; 1; 3	**KNO**; **2**; 1*	BRH; 1 Ret	BRH; 2 Ret	OUL; 1 Ret	OUL; 2; 9	SIL; 1; 12	SIL; 2 Ret					11th	84
2000	Ford Team Mondeo	Ford Mondeo	S	**BRH**; **1** ovr:1 cls:1	**BRH**; **2** ovr:7* cls:7	DON; 1 ovr:1 cls:1	DON; 2 ovr:1* cls:1	THR; 1 ovr:8 cls:8	THR; 2 ovr:3 cls:3	**KNO**; **1** ovr:2 cls:2	KNO; 2 Ret	**OUL**; **1** ovr:1 cls:1	OUL; 2 ovr:6 cls:6	SIL; 1 Ret	SIL; 2 ovr:3 cls:3	CRO; 1 ovr:5 cls:5	CRO; 2 ovr:2 cls:2	SNE; 1 Ret	SNE; 2 ovr:1* cls:1	DON; 1 ovr:8 cls:8	DON; 2 ovr:9 cls:9	BRH; 1 ovr:4 cls:4	BRH; 2 ovr:1* cls:1	OUL; 1 ovr:5 cls:5	OUL; 2 ovr:6 cls:6	SIL; 1 Ret	SIL; 2 ovr:3* cls:3							**1st**	**195**
2007	VX Racing	Vauxhall Vectra		BRH; 1	BRH; 2	BRH; 3	ROC; 1	ROC; 2	ROC; 3	THR; 1	THR; 2	THR; 3	CRO; 1	CRO; 2	CRO; 3	OUL; 1	OUL; 2	OUL; 3	DON; 1	DON; 2	DON; 3	SNE; 1	SNE; 2	SNE; 3	BRH; 1	BRH; 2	BRH; 3	KNO; 1	KNO; 2	KNO; 3	THR; 1; 4	THR; 2; 6	THR; 3; 12	15th	13
2014	CHROME Edition Restart Racing	Volkswagen CC		BRH; 1; 27	BRH; 2; 17	BRH; 3; 5	DON; 1; 13	DON; 2 Ret	DON; 3; 9	THR; 1; 7	THR; 2; 18	THR; 3; 11	OUL; 1; 14	OUL; 2; 10	OUL; 3; 7	CRO; 1; 7	CRO; 2 Ret	CRO; 3; 8	SNE; 1; 5	SNE; 2 Ret	SNE; 3; 14	KNO; 1; 11	KNO; 2; 15	KNO; 3; 8	ROC; 1; 4	ROC; 2; 6	**ROC**; **3**; 2	SIL; 1; 5	SIL; 2; 3	SIL; 3; 5	BRH; 1; 13	BRH; 2 Ret	BRH; 3 DNS	11th	176
2015	Team BMR RCIB Insurance	Volkswagen CC		BRH; 1	BRH; 2	BRH; 3	DON; 1	DON; 2	DON; 3	THR; 1	THR; 2	THR; 3	OUL; 1	OUL; 2	OUL; 3	CRO; 1	CRO; 2	CRO; 3	SNE; 1	SNE; 2	SNE; 3	KNO; 1	KNO; 2	KNO; 3	ROC; 1	ROC; 2	ROC; 3	SIL; 1	SIL; 2	SIL; 3	BRH; 1 Ret	BRH; 2; 15	BRH; 3; 21	27th	1

=== Complete Italian Touring Car Championship results ===
(key) (Races in bold indicate pole position) (Races in italics indicate fastest lap)

Year	Team	Car	1	2	3	4	5	6	7	8	9	10	11	12	13	14	15	16	17	18	19	20	DC	Pts
1995	Williams Renault Dealer Racing	Renault Laguna	MIS; 1	MIS; 2	BIN; 1	BIN; 2	MNZ; 1	MNZ; 2	IMO; 1	IMO; 2	MAG; 1	MAG; 2	MUG; 1	MUG; 2	MIS; 1	MIS; 2	PER; 1	PER; 2	VAR; 1	VAR; 2	VAL; 1 Ret‡	VAL; 2 DNS	NC‡	0‡

‡ Guest driver – not eligible for points

=== Complete V8 Supercar Championship results ===
(key) (Races in bold indicate pole position) (Races in italics indicate fastest lap)

Year	Team	Car	1	2	3	4	5	6	7	8	9	10	11	12	13	14	15	16	17	18	19	20	21	22	23	24	25	26	27	28	29	30	31	32	33	Pos.	Pts
2000	Larkham Motor Sport	Ford Falcon AU	PHI; R1	PHI; R2	BAR; R3	BAR; R4	BAR; R5	ADE; R6	ADE; R7	EAS; R8	EAS; R9	EAS; R10	HDV; R11	HDV; R12	HDV; R13	CAN; R14	CAN; R15	CAN; R16	QLD; R17	QLD; R18	QLD; R19	WIN; R20	WIN; R21	WIN; R22	ORA; R23	ORA; R24	ORA; R25	CAL; R26	CAL; R27	CAL; R28	QLD; R29	SAN; R30	SAN; R31	SAN; R32	BAT; R33; 18	NC	0
2004	Ford Performance Racing	Ford Falcon BA	ADE; R1	ADE; R2	EAS; R3	PUK; R4	PUK; R5	PUK; R6	HDV; R7	HDV; R8	HDV; R9	BAR; R10	BAR; R11	BAR; R12	QLD; R13	WIN; R14	ORA; R15	ORA; R16	SAN; R17; 19	BAT; R18; Ret	SUR; R19	SUR; R20	SYM; R21	SYM; R22	SYM; R23	EAS; R24	EAS; R25	EAS; R26								63rd	120
2005	Larkham Motor Sport	Ford Falcon BA	ADE; R1	ADE; R2	PUK; R3	PUK; R4	PUK; R5	BAR; R6	BAR; R7	BAR; R8	EAS; R9	EAS; R10	SHA; R11	SHA; R12	SHA; R13	HDV; R14	HDV; R15	HDV; R16	QLD; R17	ORA; R18	ORA; R19	SAN; R20; Ret	BAT; R21; 12	SUR; R22	SUR; R23	SUR; R24	SYM; R25	SYM; R26	SYM; R27	PHI; R28	PHI; R29	PHI; R30				51st	148
2010	Brad Jones Racing	Holden Commodore VE	YMC; R1	YMC; R2	BHR; R3	BHR; R4	ADE; R5	ADE; R6	HAM; R7	HAM; R8	QLD; R9	QLD; R10	WIN; R11	WIN; R12	HDV; R13	HDV; R14	TOW; R15	TOW; R16	PHI; Q	PHI; R17	BAT; R18	SUR; R19; 7	SUR; R20; Ret	SYM; R21	SYM; R22	SAN; R23	SAN; R24	SYD; R25	SYD; R26							NC	0

=== Complete World Touring Car Championship results ===
(key) (Races in bold indicate pole position) (Races in italics indicate fastest lap)

Year	Team	Car	1	2	3	4	5	6	7	8	9	10	11	12	13	14	15	16	17	18	19	20	21	22	23	24	DC	Points
2005	Chevrolet	Chevrolet Lacetti	ITA; 1; 22	ITA; 2; 24†	FRA; 1 Ret	FRA; 2 DNS	GBR; 1 Ret	GBR; 2; 13	SMR; 1; 14	SMR; 2; 14	MEX; 1 NC	MEX; 2; 13	BEL; 1; 14	BEL; 2; 6	GER; 1; 11	GER; 2; 8	TUR; 1; 10	TUR; 2; 8	ESP; 1 Ret	ESP; 2 DNS	MAC; 1; 5	MAC; 2 DSQ					17th	9
2006	Chevrolet	Chevrolet Lacetti	ITA; 1; 10	ITA; 2; 3	FRA; 1; 19	FRA; 2; 13	GBR; 1; 7	GBR; 2; 1	GER; 1; 13	GER; 2 Ret	BRA; 1; 19	BRA; 2; 10	MEX; 1; 12	MEX; 2 Ret	CZE; 1; 7	CZE; 2 Ret	TUR; 1; 20†	TUR; 2 Ret	ESP; 1; 8	**ESP**; **2**; 9	MAC; 1; 21†	MAC; 2; 10					15th	21
2007	Chevrolet	Chevrolet Lacetti	BRA; 1 Ret	BRA; 2 Ret	**NED**; **1**; 1	NED; 2 Ret	ESP; 1; 9	ESP; 2; 14	**FRA**; **1**; 1	FRA; 2; 8	CZE; 1; 8	**CZE**; **2** Ret	**POR**; **1**; 1	POR; 2; 3	SWE; 1; 8	**SWE**; **2**; 3	GER; 1 NC	GER; 2; 10	**GBR**; **1**; 1	GBR; 2 Ret	ITA; 1; 5	ITA; 2 Ret	**MAC**; **1**; 1	MAC; 2; 21†			6th	69
2008	Chevrolet	Chevrolet Lacetti	BRA; 1 Ret	BRA; 2; 10	MEX; 1; 8	**MEX**; **2**; 7	ESP; 1; 8	**ESP**; **2**; 1	FRA; 1; 10	FRA; 2 Ret	CZE; 1; 3	CZE; 2; 6	POR; 1; 11	POR; 2; 14	GBR; 1; 8	**GBR**; **2**; 1	GER; 1; 3	GER; 2 Ret	EUR; 1 Ret	EUR; 2; 12	ITA; 1; 11	ITA; 2; 5	JPN; 1 Ret	JPN; 2; 13	**MAC**; **1**; 1	MAC; 2; 13†	9th	54
2009	Chevrolet	Chevrolet Cruze LT	BRA; 1 Ret	BRA; 2; 11	MEX; 1 Ret	MEX; 2; 12	MAR; 1; 7	MAR; 2; 16	FRA; 1; 7	**FRA**; **2**; 1	ESP; 1; 15	ESP; 2; 12	CZE; 1 Ret	CZE; 2; 22	POR; 1 NC	POR; 2; 18†	**GBR**; **1**; 1	GBR; 2; 18	GER; 1; 18	GER; 2; 10	ITA; 1; 8	**ITA**; **2**; 3	JPN; 1; 9	JPN; 2; 4	MAC; 1; 4	MAC; 2; 21	10th	41
2010	Chevrolet	Chevrolet Cruze LT	BRA; 1; 3	BRA; 2; 3	MAR; 1; 9	MAR; 2 Ret	ITA; 1; 17	ITA; 2; 9	BEL; 1; 3	BEL; 2; 4	POR; 1; 5	POR; 2; 3	GBR; 1; 22	GBR; 2 NC	CZE; 1; 3	CZE; 2; 3	GER; 1; 1	GER; 2; 8	ESP; 1; 8	**ESP**; **2**; 11	JPN; 1; 7	JPN; 2; 4	MAC; 1; 7	MAC; 2 Ret			6th	173
2011	Chevrolet	Chevrolet Cruze 1.6T	BRA; 1; 6	**BRA**; **2**; 1	BEL; 1; 2	BEL; 2; 2	ITA; 1; 19†	ITA; 2; 5	**HUN**; **1**; 1	HUN; 2 Ret	CZE; 1; 3	CZE; 2; 3	**POR**; **1**; 1	POR; 2; 6	GBR; 1; 3	GBR; 2; 5	GER; 1; 5	GER; 2; 2	ESP; 1; 2	ESP; 2; 3	**JPN**; **1**; 1	JPN; 2; 4	**CHN**; **1**; 1	CHN; 2; 6	MAC; 1 Ret	MAC; 2 DNS	**3rd**	**323**
2012	Chevrolet	Chevrolet Cruze 1.6T	ITA; 1; 7	ITA; 2; 2	ESP; 1; 5	ESP; 2; 1	**MAR**; **1**; 1	MAR; 2; 3	SVK; 1; 3	SVK; 2 Ret	HUN; 1; 3	HUN; 2; 2	AUT; 1; 3	AUT; 2 Ret	POR; 1; 5	POR; 2; 1	BRA; 1; 2	BRA; 2; 2	**USA**; **1**; 18	USA; 2; 4	**JPN**; **1**; 1	JPN; 2; 5	**CHN**; **1**; 1	CHN; 2; 2	MAC; 1; 2	MAC; 2; 1	**2nd**	**401**

† – Driver did not finish the race, but was classified as he completed over 90% of the race distance.

=== Complete Porsche Supercup results ===
(key) (Races in bold indicate pole position) (Races in italics indicate fastest lap)

Year	Team	1	2	3	4	5	6	7	8	9	DC	Pts
2013	FACH Auto Tech	ESP; Ret	MON; 21	GBR	GER	HUN	BEL	ITA	UAE	UAE	25th	0

=== Complete TCR International Series results ===
(key) (Races in bold indicate pole position) (Races in italics indicate fastest lap)

Year	Team	Car	1	2	3	4	5	6	7	8	9	10	11	12	13	14	15	16	17	18	19	20	21	22	DC	Points
2015	Top Run Motorsport	Subaru Impreza STi TCR	SEP; 1	SEP; 2	SHA; 1	SHA; 2	VAL; 1	VAL; 2	ALG; 1	ALG; 2	MNZ; 1	MNZ; 2	SAL; 1	SAL; 2	SOC; 1	SOC; 2	RBR; 1	RBR; 2	MRN; 1	MRN; 2	CHA; 1; 20†	CHA; 2 DNS	MAC; 1 WD	MAC; 2 WD	NC	0
2016	WestCoast Racing	Honda Civic TCR	BHR; 1	BHR; 2	EST; 1	EST; 2	SPA; 1	SPA; 2	IMO; 1 Ret	IMO; 2; 10	SAL; 1	SAL; 2	OSC; 1	OSC; 2	SOC; 1	SOC; 2	CHA; 1	CHA; 2	MRN; 1	MRN; 2	SEP; 1	SEP; 2	MAC; 1	MAC; 2	37th	1
2017	BRC Racing Team	Hyundai i30 N TCR	RIM; 1	RIM; 2	BHR; 1	BHR; 2	SPA; 1	SPA; 2	MNZ; 1	MNZ; 2	SAL; 1	SAL; 2	HUN; 1	HUN; 2	OSC; 1	OSC; 2	CHA; 1	CHA; 2	ZHE; 1; 12	ZHE; 2; 4	DUB; 1 Ret	DUB; 2; 5			NC‡	0‡

^{†} Driver did not finish the race, but was classified as he completed over 75% of the race distance.
^{‡} As Menu was a guest driver, he was ineligible to score points.

=== Complete Bathurst 1000 results ===
Year	Team	Co-driver	Car	Laps	Pos.
1997*	(United Kingdom) Williams Renault Dealer Racing	(United Kingdom) Jason Plato	Renault Laguna	114	DNF
1998	(Australia) Tomas Mezera Motorsport	(Australia) Tomas Mezera	Holden Commodore VT	0	DNF
2000	(Australia) Larkham Motor Sport	(Australia) Mark Larkham	Ford Falcon AU	154	18th
2004	(Australia) Ford Performance Racing	(Australia) Adam Macrow	Ford Falcon BA	43	DNF
2005	(Australia) Larkham Motor Sport	(New Zealand) Matt Halliday	Ford Falcon BA	157	12th

* Super Touring race

=== Complete 24 Hours of Le Mans results ===
Year	Team	Co-drivers	Car	Class	Laps	Pos.	Class pos.
2002	(United Kingdom) Prodrive	(Sweden) Rickard Rydell (Czech Republic) Tomáš Enge	Ferrari 550-GTS Maranello	GTS	174	DNF	DNF
2004	(United Kingdom) Prodrive Racing	(Netherlands) Peter Kox (Czech Republic) Tomáš Enge	Ferrari 550-GTS Maranello	GTS	325	11th	4th

Sporting positions
Preceded by Frank Biela	British Touring Car Champion; 1997	Succeeded by Rickard Rydell
Preceded by Laurent Aïello	British Touring Car Champion; 2000	Succeeded by Jason Plato
Preceded by Diego Aventín; Luciano Burti	Winner of the 200 km de Buenos Aires; 2006 (with Matías Rossi)	Succeeded by Juan Manuel Silva; Ezequiel Bosio
Awards and achievements
Preceded by Frank Biela	Autosport; National Racing Driver of the Year; 1997	Succeeded by Rickard Rydell
