= Bernd Mayländer =

German racing driver (born 1971)

- Mayländer at the 2026 F1 Academy
- Nationality: (Germany) German
- Born: Bernd Michael Mayländer; 29 May 1971 (age 55) Waiblingen, West Germany

Previous series
- 1995–1996 1997–1998 2001–2004: DTM (ITC); FIA GT; DTM

24 Hours of Le Mans career
- Years: 1999
- Teams: Champion Racing
- Best finish: 19th
- Class wins: 0

Bernd Michael Mayländer (born 29 May 1971) is a German racing driver and current Formula One safety car driver.

== Racing career ==
Mayländer started his career in karting at the end of the 1980s. In the following years, he made his way to the Formula Ford, the Porsche Carrera Cup and the original DTM. When the Deutsche Tourenwagen Masters (DTM) series was resumed in 2000, he drove for Mercedes-Benz. He raced for Mercedes in DTM from 2001 to 2004, having won one race at Hockenheimring in 2001.

== Safety car driver in Formula One ==
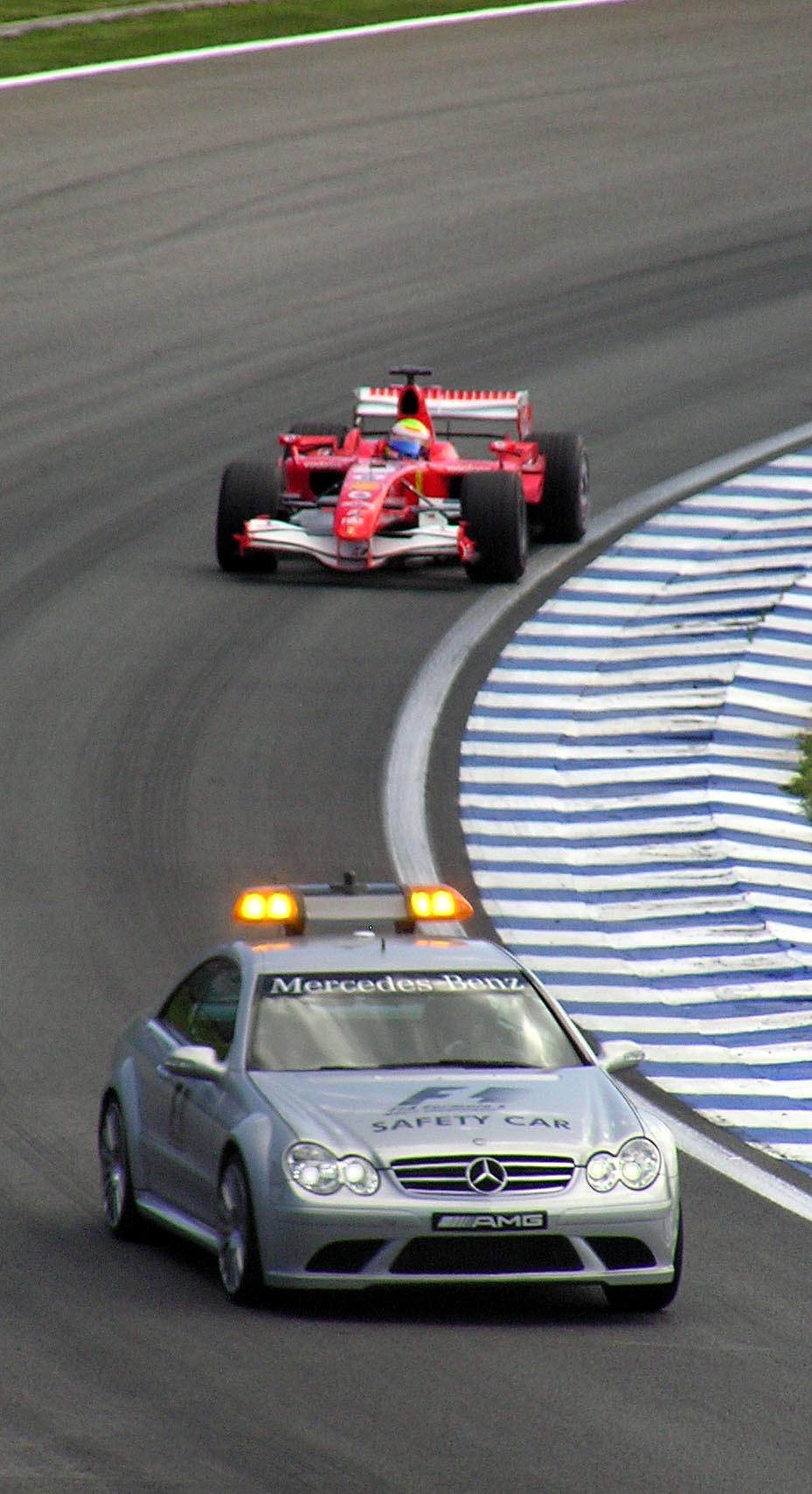
Mayländer ahead of race leader Felipe Massa at the 2006 Brazilian GP

Mayländer is the safety car driver for all Formula One races. He has driven the Formula One safety car since 2000 with very few exceptions, such as the 2001 Monaco Grand Prix and 2001 Canadian Grand Prix, when he was injured and was replaced by Marcel Fässler and the 2002 United States Grand Prix when he was replaced by Irish racing driver Damien Faulkner.

As of 2018, Mayländer had led over 700 laps in Formula One during his career. Peter Tibbetts serves as his map reader.

During a test prior to the 2024 Italian Grand Prix, after brake failure, Mayländer spun the safety car crashing into a barrier to reduce impact speed at the Parabolica. He and passenger Richard Darker were not injured in the incident.

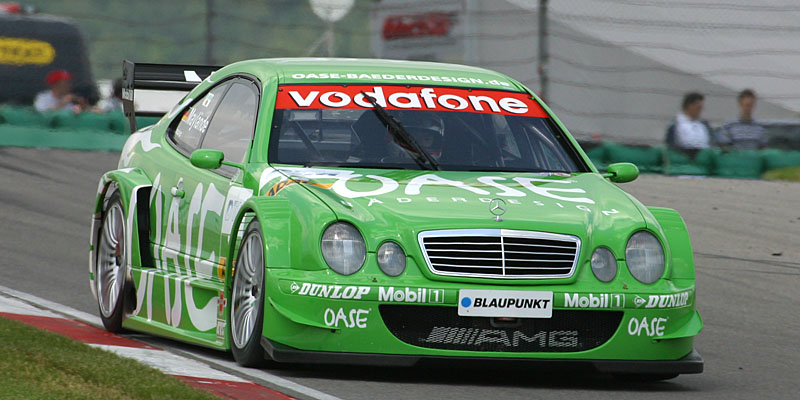
Mayländer competing in the 2002 DTM season

== Other ==
In May 2005, Mayländer was one of six Mercedes-Benz drivers taking part in a record drive. Three stock E320 CDI cars drove 100,000 miles (160,000 km) in 30 days around the clock, which resulted in an average speed of 139.7 mph (224.8 km/h).

== Racing record ==
=== Complete Deutsche Tourenwagen Meisterschaft/Masters results ===
Year	Team	Car	1	2	3	4	5	6	7	8	9	10	11	12	13	14	15	16	17	18	19	20	Pos.	Pts
1995	Persson Motorsport	Mercedes C-Class V6	HOC; 1; 13	HOC; 2 NC	AVU; 1 Ret	AVU; 2; 18	NOR; 1; 16	NOR; 2; 7	DIE; 1; 9	DIE; 2; 10	NÜR; 1; 11	NÜR; 2; 11	ALE; 1; 13	ALE; 2 Ret	HOC; 1; 9	HOC; 1; 8							20th	12
2001	Manthey Racing	AMG-Mercedes CLK-DTM 2001	HOC; QR; 9	HOC; CR; 9	NÜR; QR; 11	NÜR; CR; 20	OSC; QR	OSC; CR	SAC; QR	SAC; CR	NOR; QR	NOR; CR	LAU; QR; 8	LAU; CR; 13	NÜR; QR; 5	NÜR; CR; 7	A1R; QR; 9	A1R; CR; Ret	ZAN; QR; Ret	ZAN; CR; DNS	HOC; QR; 2	HOC; CR; 1	11th	28
2002	Manthey Racing	AMG-Mercedes CLK-DTM 2001	HOC; QR	HOC; CR	ZOL; QR; 19	ZOL; CR; 16	DON; QR; 14	DON; CR; 9	SAC; QR; 19	SAC; CR; 13	NOR; QR; 11	NOR; CR; 8	LAU; QR; 17	LAU; CR; Ret	NÜR; QR; 21†	NÜR; CR; 14	A1R; QR; 16	A1R; CR; Ret	ZAN; QR; 17	ZAN; CR; 11	HOC; QR; 12	HOC; CR; Ret	19th	0
2003	Persson Motorsport	AMG-Mercedes CLK 2002	HOC; 11	ADR; 10	NÜR; 17	LAU; 16	NOR; Ret	DON; 12	NÜR; 14	A1R; 15	ZAN; 16	HOC; 20†											19th	0
2004	Team Rosberg	AMG-Mercedes C-Klasse 2003	HOC; 14	EST; 18	ADR; Ret	LAU; Ret	NOR; 13	SHA^{1} DNS	NÜR; 15	OSC; 19	ZAN; 15	BRN; 16	HOC; 14										20th	0

† Driver did not finish, but was classified as he completed 90% of the winner's race distance. ^{1} - Shanghai was a non-championship round.

=== Complete International Touring Car Championship ===
Year	Team	Car	1	2	3	4	5	6	7	8	9	10	11	12	13	14	15	16	17	18	19	20	21	22	23	24	25	26	Pos.	Pts
1995	Persson Motorsport	Mercedes C-Class V6	MUG; 1; 12	MUG; 2; 10	HEL; 1; 9	HEL; 2; 9	DON; 1; 11	DON; 2; 8	EST; 1; 12	EST; 2; 13	MAG; 1 Ret	MAG; 2; 12																	19th	8
1996	Persson Motorsport	Mercedes C-Class	HOC; 1 Ret	HOC; 2 Ret	NÜR; 1; 16	NÜR; 2 Ret	EST; 1; 14	EST; 2 Ret	HEL; 1; 11	HEL; 2; 7	NOR; 1; 16†	NOR; 2; 11	DIE; 1; 19	DIE; 2; 14															24th	15
1996	Warsteiner Mercedes-AMG	Mercedes C-Class													SIL; 1; 14	SIL; 2 Ret	NÜR; 1; 11	NÜR; 2; 9	MAG; 1 Ret	MAG; 2 DNS	MUG; 1 Ret	MUG; 2 Ret	HOC; 1; 9	HOC; 2 Ret	INT; 1; 16	INT; 2; 7	SUZ; 1; 8	SUZ; 2 Ret	24th	15

† Driver did not finish the race, but was classified as he completed over 90% of the race distance.

=== 24 Hours of Le Mans results ===
Year	Team	Co-Drivers	Car	Class	Laps	Pos.	Class Pos.
1999	(United States) Champion Racing	(Germany) Dirk Müller (France) Bob Wollek	Porsche 911 GT3-R	GT	292	19th	2nd

Sporting positions
Preceded by Wolfgang Land	Porsche Carrera Cup Germany champion 1994	Succeeded by Harald Grohs
Preceded by Oliver Gavin	F1 Safety Car Driver; 2000–2001	Succeeded by Marcel Fässler
Preceded by Marcel Fässler	F1 Safety Car Driver; 2001–	Succeeded by Incumbent
