= 2009 FIA WTCC Race of Portugal =

Race details
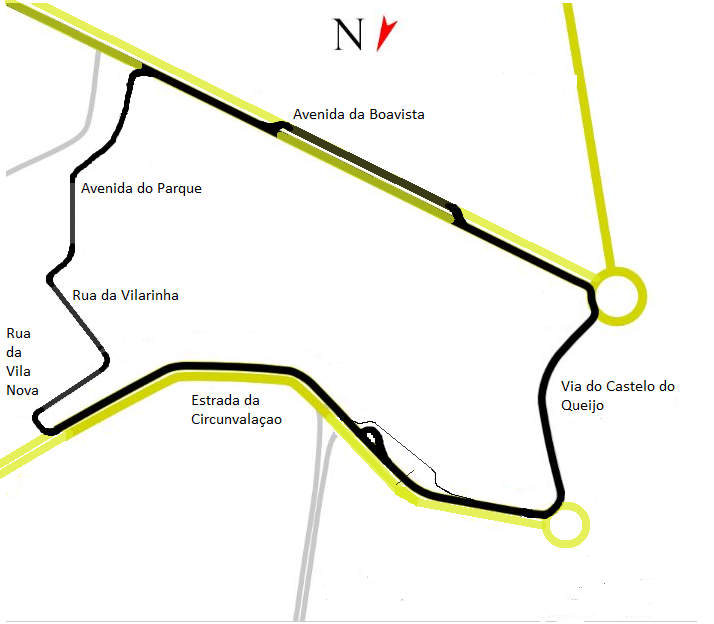
- Round 7 of 12 in the 2009 World Touring Car Championship at Circuito da Boavista in Porto, Portugal.
- Date: 5 July, 2009
- Location: Porto, Portugal
- Course: Circuito da Boavista; 4.770 kilometres (2.964 mi)

Race One
- Laps: 12
Pole position
Driver		(Italy) Gabriele Tarquini	SEAT Sport
Time		2:09.308	
Podium
First		(Italy) Gabriele Tarquini	SEAT Sport
Second		(United Kingdom) Robert Huff	Chevrolet
Third		(France) Yvan Muller	SEAT Sport
Fastest Lap
Driver		(Italy) Gabriele Tarquini	SEAT Sport
Time		2:11.154	

Race Two
- Laps: 13
Podium
First		(Brazil) Augusto Farfus	BMW Team Germany
Second		(France) Yvan Muller	SEAT Sport
Third		(Sweden) Rickard Rydell	SEAT Sport
Fastest Lap
Driver		(Brazil) Augusto Farfus	BMW Team Germany
Time		2:11.045	

The 2009 FIA WTCC Race of Portugal was the seventh round of the 2009 World Touring Car Championship season and the third FIA WTCC Race of Portugal. It was held on 5 July 2009 at the temporary Circuito da Boavista street course in Porto, Portugal. The first race was won by Gabriele Tarquini for SEAT Sport and the second race was won by Augusto Farfus for BMW Team Germany.

== Background ==
The second race of the day was the 100th World Touring Car Championship race since its reintroduction at Monza in 2005. It also saw the debut of the new Lada Priora, with former race-winner James Thompson behind the wheel for LADA Sport. Diego Puyo made his series debut for SUNRED Engineering, after scoring more points than any other driver in the SEAT Leon Eurocup round at Brno.

== Report ==
=== Testing and Free Practice ===
Testing took place on Friday afternoon, with Augusto Farfus quickest in the half-hour session for BMW Team Germany. The first free practice session took place on the Saturday morning, with Farfus quickest again. Chevrolet's Rob Huff was quickest in the second practice session shortly after midday.

=== Qualifying ===
Qualifying took place on the Saturday afternoon. SEAT Sport's Yvan Muller was quickest in Qualifying 1, after which the fastest ten drivers go through to Qualifying 2. Gabriele Tarquini took pole position for SEAT Sport, with Huff second and Yvan Muller third. Tom Coronel was the fastest independent in Qualifying, starting from 12th.

=== Warm Up ===
The fifteen-minute Sunday morning warm-up session took part on a wet track, with Rob Huff fastest.

=== Race One ===
Race 1 started on a drying track at 11:34 local time. The red flag was brought out and the race was suspended at the end of the first lap for two separate incidents on the opening lap. As the leaders made their way away from the grid, the BMW of Sergio Hernández and the Lada of Jaap van Lagen, who started 17th and 18th respectively tangled after the rolling start, pitching Hernandez in the concrete barrier. Hernandez was subsequently taken to hospital for checks on his ankle. Later on in the lap, Farfus collided with Alain Menu, spinning Menu into the wall. Nicola Larini tagged Tiago Monteiro as they tried to avoid the incident. The track became blocked as Mehdi Bennani ran into Menu's stationary Chevrolet Cruze.

After the restart Tarquini led Huff and Yvan Muller to victory. On the last lap, Andy Priaulx, running in fourth, and Jorg Muller, running seventh, slowed to allow BWW teammate Farfus (who had served a drive-through-penalty for the first lap incident with Menu) past them to allow him to finish eighth, securing one championship point and pole position for the second race.

Stefano D'Aste was the leading independent, finishing in tenth place. Tarquini recorded the fastest lap of the race.

=== Race Two ===
Race 2 started at 16:50 local time. The unusually large gap in time between the two races was to allow for TV broadcaster Eurosport to cover the Tour de France. On the third lap Rob Huff passed teammate Nicola Larini for sixth. Gabriele Tarquini tried to make a late move down the inside of Larini to follow Huff past but the two Italian veterans collided and both ended up in the tyre wall on the exit of the turn. As the field went on by, Mehdi Bennani ran wide and as he picked his way through the middle of the two stranded cars he rejoined the racing line in the path of fellow SEAT driver Tom Boardman. The safety car was deployed.

Farfus was still leading when the race was red-flagged following a crash involving Alain Menu and Franz Engstler on lap 10, which left Menu's car stranded in the middle of the narrow track. Farfus completed the two laps after the stoppage to win the 100th WTCC race ahead of four SEATs.

Stefano D'Aste was once again the independents’ winner and Farfus took the fastest lap.

== Results ==
=== Qualifying ===
Pos.	No.	Name	Team	Car	C	Q1	Q2
1	2	(Italy) Gabriele Tarquini	SEAT Sport	SEAT León 2.0 TDI		2:09.471	2:09.308
2	11	(United Kingdom) Robert Huff	Chevrolet	Chevrolet Cruze LT		2:09.601	2:09.395
3	1	(France) Yvan Muller	SEAT Sport	SEAT León 2.0 TDI		2:09.361	2:09.493
4	6	(United Kingdom) Andy Priaulx	BMW Team UK	BMW 320si		2:09.676	2:09.563
5	12	(Switzerland) Alain Menu	Chevrolet	Chevrolet Cruze LT		2:09.856	2:09.670
6	5	(Portugal) Tiago Monteiro	SEAT Sport	SEAT León 2.0 TDI		2:09.892	2:09.679
7	8	(Brazil) Augusto Farfus	BMW Team Germany	BMW 320si		2:09.928	2:09.786
8	14	(Italy) Nicola Larini	Chevrolet	Chevrolet Cruze LT		2:09.797	2:09.859
9	3	(Sweden) Rickard Rydell	SEAT Sport	SEAT León 2.0 TDI		2:09.967	2:10.089
10	4	(Spain) Jordi Gené	SEAT Sport	SEAT León 2.0 TDI		2:09.910	2:10.448
11	9	(Italy) Alessandro Zanardi	BMW Team Italy-Spain	BMW 320si		2:10.430	
12	7	(Germany) Jörg Müller	BMW Team Germany	BMW 320si		2:10.576	
13	21	(Netherlands) Tom Coronel	SUNRED Engineering	SEAT León 2.0 TFSI	Y	2:11.330	
14	27	(Italy) Stefano D'Aste	Wiechers-Sport	BMW 320si	Y	2:11.505	
15	23	(Spain) Félix Porteiro	Scuderia Proteam Motorsport	BMW 320si	Y	2:11.887	
16	30	(Morocco) Mehdi Bennani	Exagon Engineering	SEAT León 2.0 TFSI	Y	2:11.964	
17	10	(Spain) Sergio Hernández	BMW Team Italy-Spain	BMW 320si		2:12.007	
18	18	(Netherlands) Jaap van Lagen	LADA Sport	LADA 110 2.0		2:12.058	
19	25	(Germany) Franz Engstler	Liqui Moly Team Engstler	BMW 320si	Y	2:12.146	
20	26	(Denmark) Kristian Poulsen	Liqui Moly Team Engstler	BMW 320si	Y	2:13.271	
21	22	(United Kingdom) Tom Boardman	SUNRED Engineering	SEAT León 2.0 TFSI	Y	2:13.696	
22	19	(Russia) Kirill Ladygin	LADA Sport	LADA 110 2.0		2:13.831	
23	35	(Spain) Diego Puyo	SUNRED Engineering	SEAT León 2.0 TFSI	Y	2:13.976	

=== Race 1 ===
Pos.	No.	Name	Team	Car	C	Laps	Time/Retired	Grid	Points
1	2	(Italy) **Gabriele Tarquini**	SEAT Sport	SEAT León 2.0 TDI		12	1:04:11.274	1	10
2	11	(United Kingdom) Robert Huff	Chevrolet	Chevrolet Cruze LT		12	+2.934	2	8
3	1	(France) Yvan Muller	SEAT Sport	SEAT León 2.0 TDI		12	+7.848	3	6
4	5	(Portugal) Tiago Monteiro	SEAT Sport	SEAT León 2.0 TDI		12	+8.472	6	5
5	14	(Italy) Nicola Larini	Chevrolet	Chevrolet Cruze LT		12	+15.790	8	4
6	4	(Spain) Jordi Gené	SEAT Sport	SEAT León 2.0 TDI		12	+16.192	10	3
7	3	(Sweden) Rickard Rydell	SEAT Sport	SEAT León 2.0 TDI		12	+16.640	9	2
8	8	(Brazil) Augusto Farfus	BMW Team Germany	BMW 320si		12	+16.975	7	1
9	6	(United Kingdom) Andy Priaulx	BMW Team UK	BMW 320si		12	+17.791	4	
10	27	(Italy) Stefano D'Aste	Wiechers-Sport	BMW 320si	Y	12	+18.216	14	
11	7	(Germany) Jörg Müller	BMW Team Germany	BMW 320si		12	+19.149	12	
12	9	(Italy) Alessandro Zanardi	BMW Team Italy-Spain	BMW 320si		12	+19.442	11	
13	21	(Netherlands) Tom Coronel	SUNRED Engineering	SEAT León 2.0 TFSI	Y	12	+33.010	13	
14	23	(Spain) Félix Porteiro	Scuderia Proteam Motorsport	BMW 320si	Y	12	+42.995	15	
15	22	(United Kingdom) Tom Boardman	SUNRED Engineering	SEAT León 2.0 TFSI	Y	12	+54.702	21	
16	35	(Spain) Diego Puyo	SUNRED Engineering	SEAT León 2.0 TFSI	Y	12	+54.931	23	
17	26	(Denmark) Kristian Poulsen	Liqui Moly Team Engstler	BMW 320si	Y	12	+55.277	20	
18	36	(United Kingdom) James Thompson	LADA Sport	Lada Priora		12	+55.742	24	
19	19	(Russia) Kirill Ladygin	LADA Sport	LADA 110 2.0		12	+1:11.955	22	
20	25	(Germany) Franz Engstler	Liqui Moly Team Engstler	BMW 320si	Y	11	+1 Lap	19	
Ret	12	(Switzerland) Alain Menu	Chevrolet	Chevrolet Cruze LT		4	Race incident	5	
Ret	18	(Netherlands) Jaap van Lagen	LADA Sport	LADA 110 2.0		2	Race incident	18	
Ret	10	(Spain) Sergio Hernández	BMW Team Italy-Spain	BMW 320si		0	Race incident	17	
DSQ	30	(Morocco) Mehdi Bennani	Exagon Engineering	SEAT León 2.0 TFSI	Y	0	Disqualified	16	

- **Bold** denotes Fastest lap.

=== Race 2 ===
Pos.	No.	Name	Team	Car	C	Laps	Time/Retired	Grid	Points
1	8	(Brazil) **Augusto Farfus**	BMW Team Germany	BMW 320si		13	47:48.304	1	10
2	1	(France) Yvan Muller	SEAT Sport	SEAT León 2.0 TDI		13	+2.295	6	8
3	3	(Sweden) Rickard Rydell	SEAT Sport	SEAT León 2.0 TDI		13	+2.810	2	6
4	4	(Spain) Jordi Gené	SEAT Sport	SEAT León 2.0 TDI		13	+3.385	3	5
5	5	(Portugal) Tiago Monteiro	SEAT Sport	SEAT León 2.0 TDI		13	+3.970	5	4
6	11	(United Kingdom) Robert Huff	Chevrolet	Chevrolet Cruze LT		13	+4.219	7	3
7	6	(United Kingdom) Andy Priaulx	BMW Team UK	BMW 320si		13	+4.583	9	2
8	7	(Germany) Jörg Müller	BMW Team Germany	BMW 320si		13	+5.064	11	1
9	27	(Italy) Stefano D'Aste	Wiechers-Sport	BMW 320si	Y	13	+6.428	10	
10	9	(Italy) Alessandro Zanardi	BMW Team Italy-Spain	BMW 320si		13	+7.584	12	
11	25	(Germany) Franz Engstler	Liqui Moly Team Engstler	BMW 320si	Y	13	+9.201	18	
12	21	(Netherlands) Tom Coronel	SUNRED Engineering	SEAT León 2.0 TFSI	Y	13	+13.290	13	
13	23	(Spain) Félix Porteiro	Scuderia Proteam Motorsport	BMW 320si	Y	13	+15.272	14	
14	35	(Spain) Diego Puyo	SUNRED Engineering	SEAT León 2.0 TFSI	Y	13	+17.706	15	
15	36	(United Kingdom) James Thompson	LADA Sport	Lada Priora		13	+22.964	17	
16	26	(Denmark) Kristian Poulsen	Liqui Moly Team Engstler	BMW 320si	Y	13	+53.730	16	
17	19	(Russia) Kirill Ladygin	LADA Sport	LADA 110 2.0		12	+1 Lap	23	
18	12	(Switzerland) Alain Menu	Chevrolet	Chevrolet Cruze LT		9	+4 Laps	20	
Ret	14	(Italy) Nicola Larini	Chevrolet	Chevrolet Cruze LT		5	+23.139	4	
Ret	2	(Italy) Gabriele Tarquini	SEAT Sport	SEAT León 2.0 TDI		2	+5.426	8	
Ret	30	(Morocco) Mehdi Bennani	Exagon Engineering	SEAT León 2.0 TFSI	Y	2	+43.550	21	
Ret	22	(United Kingdom) Tom Boardman	SUNRED Engineering	SEAT León 2.0 TFSI	Y	2	+34.859	22	
DNS	18	(Netherlands) Jaap van Lagen	LADA Sport	LADA 110 2.0		0	Did not start	–	
DNS	10	(Spain) Sergio Hernández	BMW Team Italy-Spain	BMW 320si		0	Did not start	19	

- **Bold** denotes Fastest lap.

== Standings after the race ==
Drivers' Championship standings

	Pos	Driver	Points
	1	(France) Yvan Muller	80
	2	(Italy) Gabriele Tarquini	66
	3	(Brazil) Augusto Farfus	65
1	4	(Sweden) Rickard Rydell	46
2	5	(United Kingdom) Robert Huff	43

Independents' Trophy standings

Pos	Driver	Points
1	(Spain) Félix Porteiro	135
2	(Netherlands) Tom Coronel	113
3	(Germany) Franz Engstler	100
4	(Italy) Stefano D'Aste	72
5	(United Kingdom) Tom Boardman	38

Manufacturers' Championship standings

Pos	Manufacturer	Points
1	(Spain) SEAT	191
2	(Germany) BMW	174
3	(United States) Chevrolet	121
4	(Russia) Lada	53

- Note: Only the top five positions are included for both sets of drivers' standings.
