= Christian Abt =

German racing driver (born 1967)

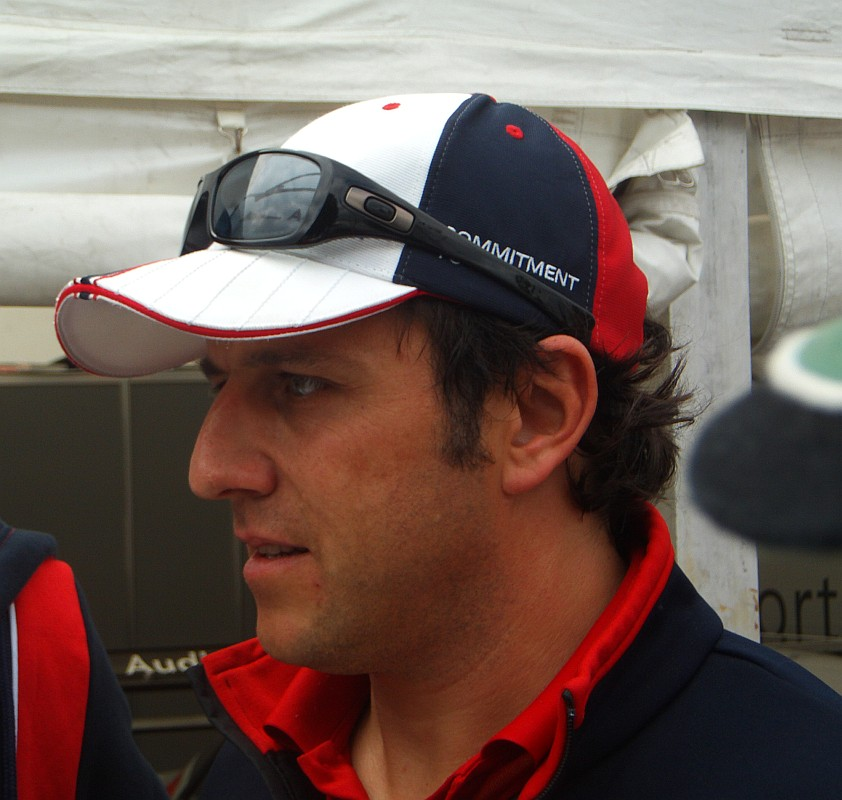
- Christian Abt in 2008
- Nationality: (Germany) German
- Born: 8 May 1967 (age 59) Kempten, West Germany
- Relatives: Hans-Jürgen Abt (brother); Daniel Abt (nephew)

Deutsche Tourenwagen Masters
- Categorisation: FIA Gold (until 2014); FIA Silver (2018–)
- Years active: 2000–2007
- Former teams: Abt Sportsline; Joest Racing; Phoenix Racing
- Starts: 102
- Wins: 1
- Podiums: 9
- Poles: 2
- Fastest laps: 8
- Best finish: 7th in 2002

24 Hours of Le Mans career
- Years: 1999–2000
- Teams: Audi Sport UK; Audi Sport Team Joest
- Best finish: 3rd (2000)
- Class wins: 0

Christian Abt (born 8 May 1967) is a former race car driver and entrepreneur born in Kempten, Germany.

His elder brother Hans-Jürgen Abt runs the Abt Sportsline Audi racing teams as well as their tuning company for Audi and Volkswagen.

== Career history ==
Abt started his career in motocross. In 1983, Abt became the German Motocross Champion. From 1986 to 1988, he won the German OMK Motocross Cup of the Southern Group in the 125 cc class three times. In 1990, Abt switched to four wheels with the ADAC Formula School and won the title.

In 1991, Abt won the Formula BMW Junior with a 29-point lead over the later rally driver Lars Mysliwietz. A year later, Abt finished 13th in the German Formula 3 Championship and was the overall winner of the B rating. Abt remained in formula racing until 1995 but was unable to achieve notable success compared to his first years. In 1996, he switched to touring cars and finished fourth in the family-owned racing team in the Super Tourenwagen Cup. In the following two years, Abt was placed in the midfield of the Super Tourenwagen Cup.

In 1999, Abt became the last champion of the Super Tourenwagen Cup in a controversial finale. Before the race at the Nürburgring, both Abt and Opel driver Uwe Alzen had chances for the title. At the end of the last lap, the order on the track was as follows: Kris Nissen (Abt Audi), Uwe Alzen, Christian Abt, and behind them Roland Asch (Opel). Nissen had already been lapped and was clearly holding up the following drivers. Asch had been disqualified earlier due to an incident but had not left the track. Alzen and Abt were in second and third place, behind Tom Kristensen (Honda). With this order, Abt would have been champion with an eight-point lead. In the NGK chicane, Nissen and Alzen first collided after the latter missed his braking point. In the last corner, Asch and Abt touched, causing Abt to retire. Alzen, who could continue with a broken suspension, would have been the champion. However, 24 days later, the DMSB Sports Court decided not to count the last lap of the race, awarding the championship to Abt.

In 2000, Abt-Sportsline entered the DTM as a private team. However, the performance of the Audi TT-R was significantly disadvantaged compared to the factory-built AMG Mercedes CLK-DTM and Opel Astra V8 Coupé. The same year, Abt finished third with Team Joest at the 24 Hours of Le Mans.

Abt's best overall placement in the DTM was seventh place in 2002. In 2005, Abt switched teams and got a year-old car from Audi Sport Team Joest Racing. After a mixed season in 2007, Abt ended his career in the DTM. In 2008, Abt started for Tolimit Motorsport in the Porsche Carrera Cup Germany and finished 14th overall.

In 2009, Abt won the ADAC GT Masters and was runner-up at the 2009 24 Hours of Nürburgring. With Team Prosperia UHC Speed, Abt was 33rd overall in the GT Masters. The following year, Abt took over the team and served as team manager until 2016.

In 2017, after a five-year hiatus as a driver, Abt finished third in the SP-X category at the 2017 24 Hours of Nürburgring.

== Personal life ==
Abt has been married and has two children - Nina and Emely.

In June 2017, Abt ended his three-year career as a city councillor for the Free Voters in Kempten.

Christian Abt is not the only race driver in his family. His father Johann Abt started racing in 1952 with a DKW motorcycle.

His brother, Hans-Jürgen Abt, competed in the Ford Fiesta Mixed Cup and the ADAC GT Cup, among others. Hans-Jürgen's wife, Margit Abt, was active in the Ford Fiesta Mixed Cup and the Seat Leon Supercopa. Their son Daniel Abt drove in the FIA Formula E Championship from 2014 to 2020.

== Racing record ==
=== Complete 24 Hours of Le Mans results ===
Year	Team	Co-Drivers	Car	Class	Laps	Pos.	Class Pos.
1999	(United Kingdom) Audi Sport UK Ltd.	(Sweden) Stefan Johansson (Monaco) Stéphane Ortelli	Audi R8C	LMGTP	55	DNF	DNF
2000	(Germany) Audi Sport Team Joest	(Italy) Michele Alboreto (Italy) Rinaldo Capello	Audi R8	LMP900	365	**3rd**	**3rd**

=== Complete Deutsche Tourenwagen Masters results ===
(key) (Races in bold indicate pole position) (Races in italics indicate fastest lap)

Year	Team	Car	1	2	3	4	5	6	7	8	9	10	11	12	13	14	15	16	17	18	19	20	DC	Points
2000	Abt Sportsline 1	Abt-Audi TT-R 2000	HOC; 1 Ret	HOC; 2 Ret	OSC; 1	OSC; 2	NOR; 1 Ret	NOR; 2 DNS	SAC; 1 Ret	SAC; 2 DNS	NÜR; 1; 18	NÜR; 2; 18	LAU; 1 C	LAU; 2 C	OSC; 1; 10	OSC; 2 Ret	NÜR; 1; 19	NÜR; 2; 14	HOC; 1 Ret	HOC; 2 Ret			19th	1
2001	Team Abt Sportsline	Audi TT-R DTM 2001	HOC; QR; 10	HOC; CR; 10	NÜR; QR; NC	NÜR; CR; Ret	OSC; QR; 8	OSC; CR; 6	SAC; QR; 3	SAC; CR; 9	NOR; QR; 5	NOR; CR; 17	LAU; QR; 5	LAU; CR; 18	NÜR; QR; 3	NÜR; CR; DSQ	A1R; QR; 18	A1R; CR; DNS	**ZAN**; **QR**; 1	**ZAN**; **CR**; 2	HOC; QR; 8	HOC; CR; 11	10th	29
2002	Abt Sportsline	Abt-Audi TT-R	HOC; QR; 4	HOC; CR; 7	ZOL; QR; 5	ZOL; CR; 2	DON; QR; 12	DON; CR; 2	SAC; QR; 8	SAC; CR; 16†	NOR; QR; DSQ	NOR; CR; DNS	LAU; QR; 3	LAU; CR; 7	NÜR; QR; 5	NÜR; CR; 9	A1R; QR; 12	A1R; CR; 9	ZAN; QR; 2	ZAN; CR; 7	HOC; QR; 5	HOC; CR; 13	7th	15
2003	Abt Sportsline	Abt-Audi TT-R 2003	HOC; 20†	ADR; DSQ	NÜR; 8	LAU; 9	NOR; 7	DON; Ret	NÜR; Ret	A1R; Ret	ZAN; 11	HOC; 9											12th	3
2004	Audi Sport Team Abt Sportsline	Audi A4 DTM 2004	HOC; Ret	EST; 10	ADR; Ret	LAU; 9	NOR; 14†	SHA^{1} Ret	NÜR; 13	OSC; 9	ZAN; Ret	BRN; 12	HOC; 8										16th	1
2005	Audi Sport Team Joest	Audi A4 DTM 2004	HOC; 4	LAU; 9	SPA; 10	BRN; 6	OSC; 12	NOR; 2	NÜR; 10	ZAN; 10	LAU; Ret	IST; Ret	HOC; 14										9th	16
2006	Audi Sport Team Phoenix	Audi A4 DTM 2005	HOC; Ret	LAU; Ret	OSC; 17	BRH; 5	NOR; 10	NÜR; 10	ZAN; Ret	CAT; 10	BUG; 9	HOC; 7											13th	6
2007	Audi Sport Team Phoenix	Audi A4 DTM 2006	HOC; Ret	OSC; 10	LAU; 17†	BRH; 8	NOR; 10	MUG; Ret	ZAN; 6	NÜR; 15	CAT; 11†	HOC; 15											16th	4

^{1} - Shanghai was a non-championship round.

- † — Retired, but was classified as he completed 90% of the winner's race distance.

Sporting positions
Preceded by Johnny Cecotto	Super Tourenwagen Cup Champion; 1999	Succeeded by Bernd Schneider; 2000 New DTM
Preceded by Tim Bergmeister	ADAC GT Masters Champion; 2009	Succeeded by Peter Kox; Albert von Thurn und Taxis
