= Opel Astra DTM =

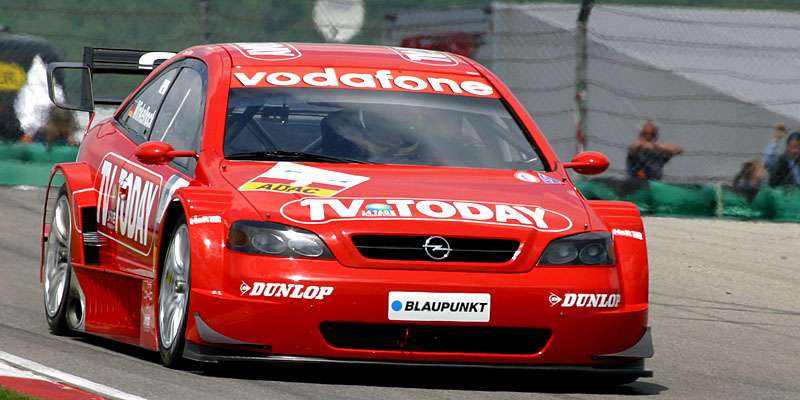
- Category: DTM (touring car)
- Constructor: Opel
- Successor: Opel Vectra GTS V8 DTM

Technical specifications
- Chassis: Steel tubular spaceframe
- Suspension: Double wishbone, adjustable coil-over shock absorbers, anti-roll bar
- Length: 4,470 mm (176 in)
- Width: 1,850 mm (73 in)
- Height: 1,250 mm (49 in)
- Axle track: 1,600 mm (63 in) on front; 1,550 mm (61 in) on rear
- Wheelbase: 2,670 mm (105 in)
- Engine: Spiess-built Cadillac-derived Opel 4.0 L (244 cu in) V8 90° naturally aspirated, front engined, longitudinally mounted
- Transmission: Xtrac 6-speed sequential manual transmission
- Power: 462 hp (345 kW) @ 6,750 rpm
- Weight: 1,080–1,110 kg (2,381–2,447 lb)
- Fuel: Shell V-Power Racing unleaded (2004); Aral Ultimate 100 RON unleaded (2005)
- Lubricants: Valvoline Racing Synthetic VR1 Motor Oil 10W-30
- Brakes: AP Racing carbon brake discs with 6-piston calipers and pads
- Tyres: Dunlop SP Sport Maxx; BBS wheels

Competition history
- Notable entrants: OPC Team Phoenix; OPC Team Holzer
- Debut: 2000 DTM Hockenheimring 1 round

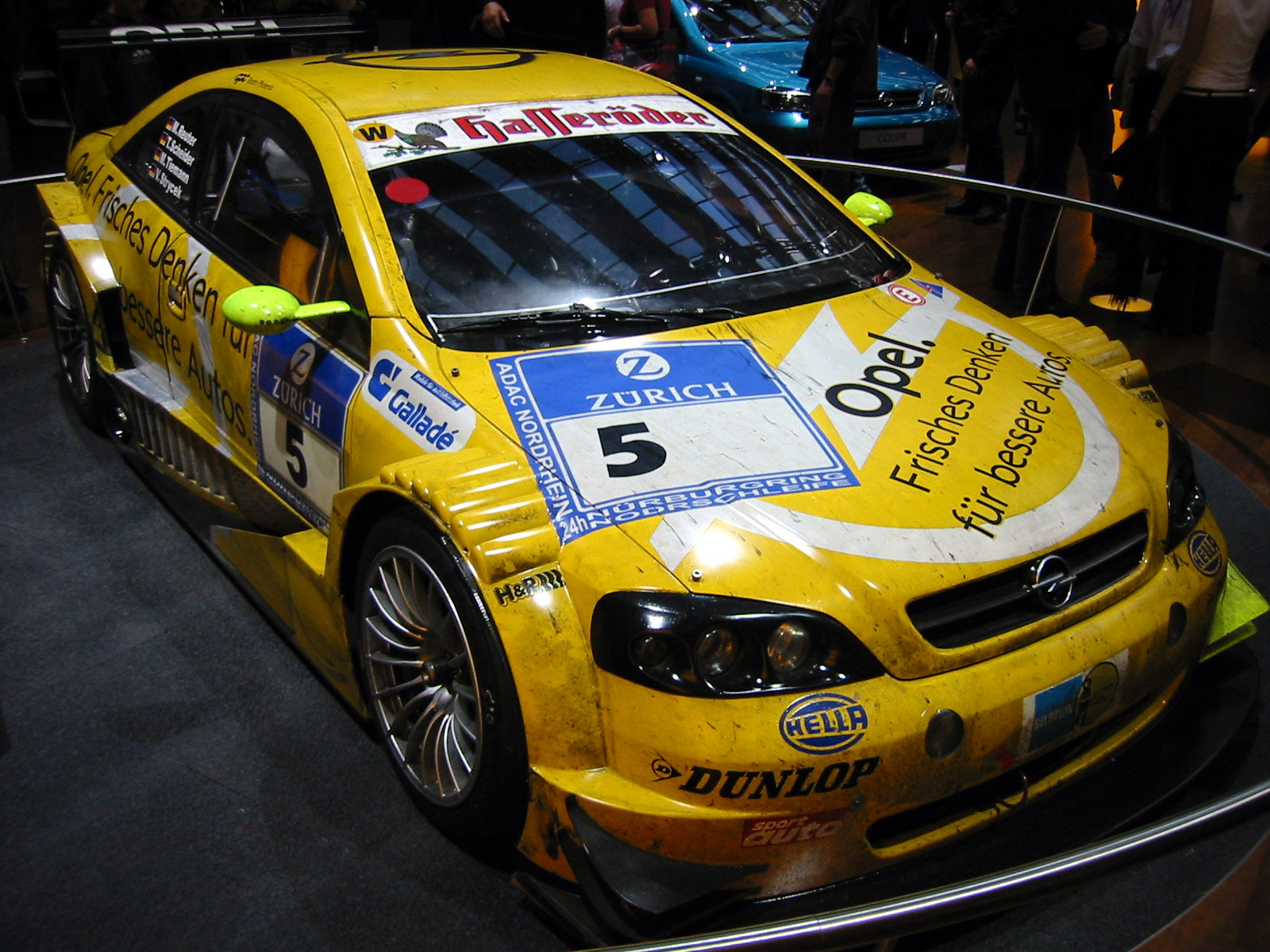
Opel Astra V8 Coupe DTM-car at the IAA 2003

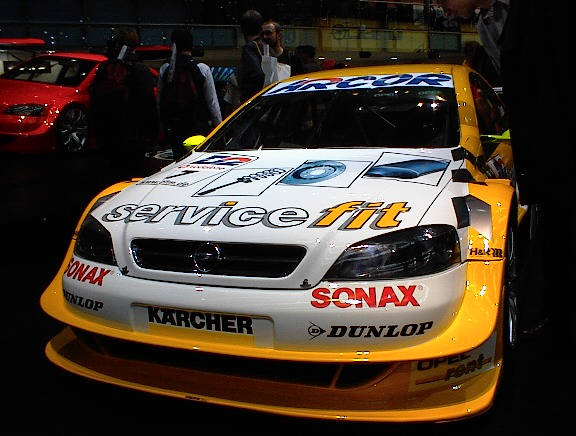
Opel Astra V8 DTM Coupe on display in 2001

The Opel Astra DTM was a specially-made and purpose-built touring car constructed by German car manufacturer Opel, for the DTM series, between 2000 and 2003.
