= Diego Romanini =

Italian auto racing driver (born 1978)

- Nationality: Italian
- Born: 30 December 1978 (age 47) Pietrasanta (Italy)

European Touring Car Cup career
- Debut season: 2012
- Current team: Proteam Racing
- Car number: TBA
- Former teams: Maurer Motorsport
- Starts: 1
- Wins: 0
- Poles: 0
- Fastest laps: 0
- Best finish: 12th (S1600 class) in 2012

Previous series
- 2011 2011 2010–11 2010–11 2009 2008 2008 2007 2006 2004 2003, 2005 2002 2002 2000–01, 2003: Italian GT Championship; Ferrari Challenge Italy; Rolex Sports Car Series; Superstars Series; FIA GT Championship; Euroseries 3000; International GT Open; Eurocup Mégane Trophy; WTCC; Produktionswagen Meisterschaft; Recaro Formel 3 Cup; British F3 Championship; French F3 Championship; Austria Formula 3 Cup

Championship titles
- 2001, 2003: Austria Formula 3 Cup

Diego Romanini (born 30 December 1978 in Pietrasanta) is an Italian auto racing driver. He has competed in the World Touring Car Championship and was the Austria Formula 3 Cup champion in 2001 and 2003.

== Career ==
After starting his career in karting, Romanini first started circuit racing in 1998 with Italian Formula Renault, before racing in the Italian Formula Campus Series. In 2000, he competed in Austrian Formula Three, becoming champion in 2001. He spent one year in the British Formula 3 Championship, then returned to the Austrian series in 2003, where he regained his title. Also that year, he won the Centraleurop Formula Three Championship, and drove in the German Formula Three Championship. 2004 saw him first drive in Touring cars, with a season in the German Touring Car Challenge, finishing sixth on points. He competed in selected races in German Formula Three and the FIA GT Championship in 2005.

For 2006, Romanini got a drive in the FIA World Touring Car Championship for the independent Wiechers-Sport Team, in a BMW 320i. He finished sixth in the Yokohama Independent Trophy, with a best placed race finish of thirteenth in round twelve at Puebla.

In 2008, Romanini raced in the International GT Open and selected rounds of the Euroseries 3000.

In 2011, Romanini raced 5 VLN races and the 24h race at the Nürburgring Nordschleife with the BMW 325i E92 from Motorsport Team Sorg Rennsport. He took 3 VLN and the 24h victory in class.

Romamini would drive for Proteam Racing from the second round of the 2013 European Touring Car Cup season in Slovakia in a BMW 320si with the option of joining the team for future WTCC events.

== Racing record ==
=== Complete World Touring Car Championship results ===
(key) (Races in bold indicate pole position) (Races in italics indicate fastest lap)

Year	Team	Car	1	2	3	4	5	6	7	8	9	10	11	12	13	14	15	16	17	18	19	20	DC	Points
2006	Wiechers-Sport	BMW 320i	ITA; 1; 20	ITA; 2; 24†	FRA; 1; 27	FRA; 2; 22	GBR; 1; 15	GBR; 2 Ret	GER; 1; 22	GER; 2; 25†	BRA; 1; 22	BRA; 2; 17	MEX; 1; 20	MEX; 2; 13	CZE; 1; 23	CZE; 2; 19	TUR; 1; 18	TUR; 2; 18	ESP; 1; 22	ESP; 2; 23	MAC; 1; 18	MAC; 2; 15	NC	0

^{†} Driver did not finish the race, but was classified as he completed over 90% of the race distance.

=== Complete International Superstars Series/EuroV8 Series results ===
(key) (Races in bold indicate pole position) (Races in italics indicate fastest lap)

Year	Team	Car	1	2	3	4	5	6	7	8	9	10	11	12	13	14	15	16	DC	Points
2010	FR Competition	BMW 550i (E60)	MNZ; 1 Ret	MNZ; 2 Ret	IMO; 1; 14	IMO; 2; 12	ALG; 1; 9	ALG; 2; 11	HOC; 1; 16	HOC; 2; 15									22nd	10
2010	CAAL Racing	Mercedes C63 AMG									CPR; 1; 5	CPR; 2; 12	VAL; 1 Ret	VAL; 2 Ret	KYA; 1; 11	KYA; 2 Ret			22nd	10
2011	MN Motorsport	Lexus IS-F	MNZ; 1	MNZ; 2	VNC; 1	VNC; 2	ALG; 1	ALG; 2	DON; 1	DON; 1	MIS; 1 DNS	MIS; 2 DNS	SPA; 1	SPA; 2	MUG; 1	MUG; 2	VAL; 1	VAL; 2	NC	0
2013	MRT by Nocentini	Lexus IS-F 500	MNZ; R1	MNZ; R2	BRN; R1	BRN; R2	SVK; R1	SVK; R2	ZOL; R1	ZOL; R2	ALG; R1	ALG; R2	DON; R1; 9	DON; R2; DNS	IMO; R1	IMO; R2	VAL; R1	VAL; R2	31st	3
2014	CAAL Racing	Mercedes C63 AMG	MNZ; R1; 13†	MNZ; R2; 9	VAL; R1; 6	VAL; R2; Ret	MUG; R1; 4	MUG; R2; Ret	BRN; R1; 8	BRN; R2; 6	SAC; 1	HOC; 1; 3							8th	82

^{†} Driver did not finish the race, but was classified as he completed over 90% of the race distance.

=== Complete TCR International Series results ===
(key) (Races in bold indicate pole position) (Races in italics indicate fastest lap)

Year	Team	Car	1	2	3	4	5	6	7	8	9	10	11	12	13	14	15	16	17	18	19	20	21	22	DC	Points
2015	Proteam Racing	Ford Focus ST	MYS; 1 DNS	MYS; 2 DNS	CHN; 1	CHN; 2	ESP; 1	ESP; 2	POR; 1	POR; 2	ITA; 1	ITA; 2	AUT; 1	AUT; 2	RUS; 1	RUS; 2	RBR; 1 Ret	RBR; 2 Ret	SIN; 1	SIN; 2	THA; 1	THA; 2	MAC; 1	MAC; 2	NC	0

Sporting positions
Preceded by Marco Schärf	Austria Formula 3 Cup champion 2001	Succeeded by Hannes Neuhauser
Preceded by Hannes Neuhauser	Austria Formula 3 Cup champion 2003	Succeeded by Jan Seyffarth
