= Maurizio Ceresoli =

Italian auto racing driver

Maurizio Ceresoli (born 25 May 1983, in Modena) is an Italian auto racing driver.

Ceresoli's first serious racing came in 2002, with the Italian Formula Ford Series. In his first season, he finished as runner-up. One more year was spent in the championship, where he finished fifth on points, before moving on to the Italian Formula Three Championship in 2004. Two seasons were spent here, finishing ninth in his first year, and fifth in 2005, both times for the Passoli Team.

== WTCC ==
In 2006, Ceresoli competed in the FIA World Touring Car Championship, driving a full season for the independent GR Asia Team in a SEAT Toledo. From round thirteen, he switched car to a newly built SEAT Leon. His best placed finish was a fourteenth in race one at Brands Hatch. He ended the year fifth in the Yokohama Independents Trophy. For 2007 he remained with GR Asia in the Leon, but did not drive until round five at Valencia. He has also driven in the European Touring Car Cup.

== Racing record ==
=== Complete World Touring Car Championship results ===
(key) (Races in bold indicate pole position) (Races in italics indicate fastest lap)

Year	Team	Car	1	2	3	4	5	6	7	8	9	10	11	12	13	14	15	16	17	18	19	20	21	22	DC	Points
2006	GR Asia	SEAT Toledo Cupra	ITA; 1; 25	ITA; 2; 19	FRA; 1 NC	FRA; 2; 19	GBR; 1; 14	GBR; 2; 19	GER; 1; 21	GER; 2; 22	BRA; 1 Ret	BRA; 2 DNS	MEX; 1; 16	MEX; 2; 16†											NC	0
2006	GR Asia	SEAT León													CZE; 1; 20	CZE; 2 NC	TUR; 1; 16	TUR; 2; 17	ESP; 1; 17	ESP; 2; 18	MAC; 1; 17	MAC; 2 Ret			NC	0
2007	GR Asia	SEAT León	BRA; 1	BRA; 2	NED; 1	NED; 2	ESP; 1; 15	ESP; 2; 23	FRA; 1 Ret	FRA; 2; 15	CZE; 1; 17	CZE; 2; 14	POR; 1; 18	POR; 2; 16	SWE; 1; 23	SWE; 2; 25	GER; 1; 15	GER; 2; 16	GBR; 1 Ret	GBR; 2; 19	ITA; 1; 17	ITA; 2 Ret	MAC; 1; 22	MAC; 2; 18	NC	0

^{†} Driver did not finish the race, but was classified as he completed over 90% of the race distance.
