= Simone Iacone =

Italian racing driver

Simone Iacone (born February 8, 1984, in Pescara) is an Italian auto racing driver. After winning the Italian Alfa Challenge (under 25) in 2003 and the European Alfa Romeo 147 Challenge in 2004, he made his Italian Supertutismo Championship debut in 2006.

== Career ==
Simone had a successful career in karts, finishing second in the Italian Kart Championship in 1996 and 1997 (60mini kart, 100junior). In 2003, he began competing in the Italian Alfa Challenge where he took in ten races seven podiums, three pole positions, five lap records and winning the Under 25 title.

In 2004, Iaccone won the European Alfa Romeo 147 Challenge after three wins (Monza, Valencia, Spa) and seven podiums.

Iacone joined Zerocinque Motorsport in 2006 for its Italian Superturismo Championship campaign, where he finished in sixth place. The championship ran in two rounds of the 2006 World Touring Car Championship season.

In 2010, Iaccone won the Italian Seat Leon Supercopa driving for Team Prs Group, winning four races, one pole position and eight podiums.

=== Complete World Touring Car Championship results ===
(key) (Races in bold indicate pole position) (Races in italics indicate fastest lap)

Year	Team	Car	1	2	3	4	5	6	7	8	9	10	11	12	13	14	15	16	17	18	19	20	DC	Pts
2006	Zerocinque Motorsport	BMW 320i	ITA; 1; 16	ITA; 2; 11	FRA; 1; 25	FRA; 2 DNS	GBR; 1	GBR; 2	GER; 1	GER; 2	BRA; 1	BRA; 2	MEX; 1	MEX; 2	CZE; 1	CZE; 2	TUR; 1	TUR; 2	ESP; 1	ESP; 2	MAC; 1	MAC; 2	NC	0
