= Stefano Valli =

Sammarinese auto racing driver (born 1969)

Stefano Valli (born 21 March 1969 in San Marino) is a Sammarinese racing driver.

== Career ==
Valli competed in two rounds of the 2001 European Super Touring Championship for GDL Racing. He finished third in the 2002 Italian Super Production Championship.

In 2005, Valli raced at three rounds of the World Touring Car Championship (WTCC) for Zerocinque Motorsport, which also doubled up as rounds of the Italian Superturismo Championship. He also competed in the 2005 European Touring Car Cup at ACI Vallelunga Circuit for Zerocinque. In 2006, Valli and Zerocinque competed in two rounds of the WTCC. He also attended the ETC Cup, this time at Autódromo do Estoril, finishing sixth in the Super Production class.

== Racing record ==
=== Complete World Touring Car Championship results ===
(key) (Races in bold indicate pole position) (Races in italics indicate fastest lap)

Year	Team	Car	1	2	3	4	5	6	7	8	9	10	11	12	13	14	15	16	17	18	19	20	DC	Points
2005	Zerocinque Motorsport	BMW 320i	ITA; 1; 27	ITA; 2; 19	FRA; 1; 25	FRA; 2; 23	GBR; 1	GBR; 2	SMR; 1; 24	SMR; 2 Ret	MEX; 1	MEX; 2	BEL; 1	BEL; 2	GER; 1	GER; 2	TUR; 1	TUR; 2	ESP; 1	ESP; 2	MAC; 1	MAC; 2	NC	0
2006	Zerocinque Motorsport	BMW 320i	ITA; 1; 24	ITA; 2; 17	FRA; 1 Ret	FRA; 2 DNS	GBR; 1	GBR; 2	GER; 1	GER; 2	BRA; 1	BRA; 2	MEX; 1	MEX; 2	CZE; 1	CZE; 2	TUR; 1	TUR; 2	ESP; 1	ESP; 2	MAC; 1	MAC; 2	NC	0
