= Vincent Radermecker =

Belgian racing driver (born 1967)

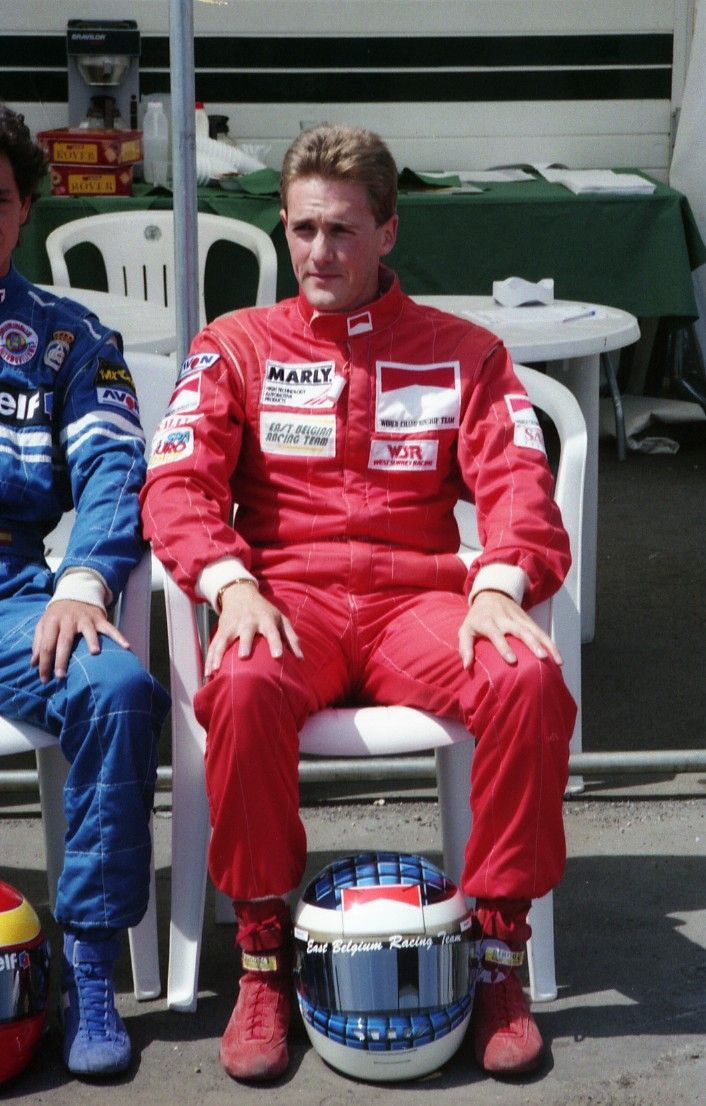
- Radermecker in 1994.
- Nationality: (Belgium) Belgian
- Born: 5 July 1967 (age 59) Liège, Belgium
- Categorisation: FIA Gold (until 2017); FIA Silver (2018–2022); FIA Bronze (2023–)

Vincent Radermecker (born 5 July 1967) is a Belgian racing driver.

== Racing career ==
=== Early years ===
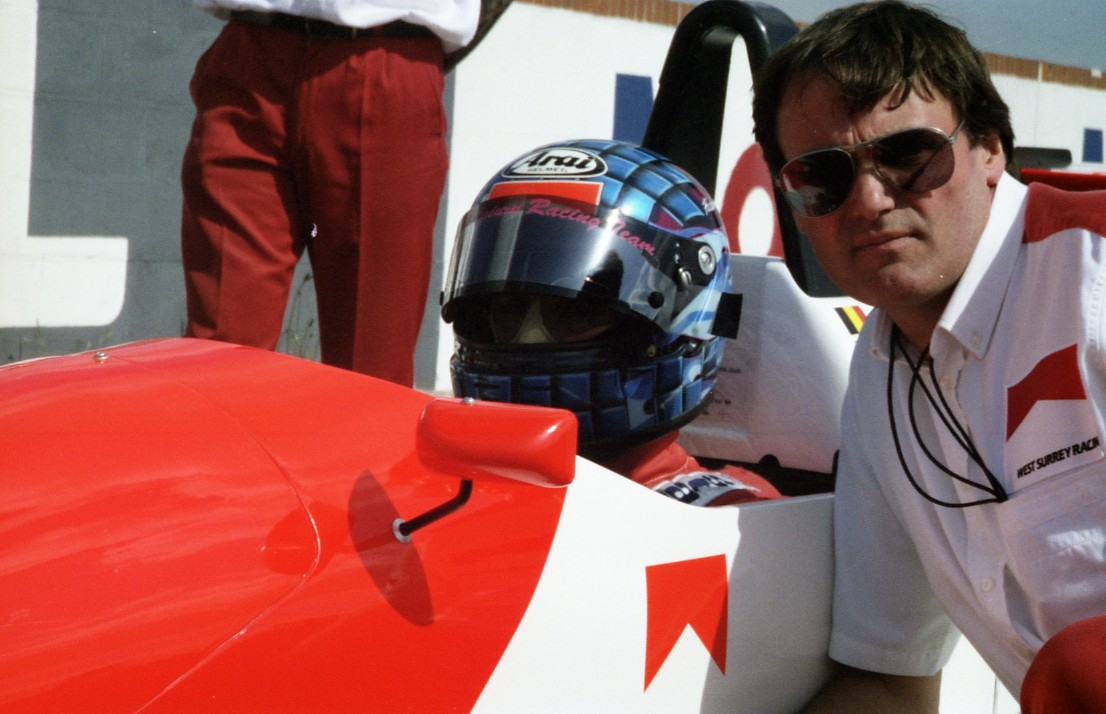
Vincent Radermecker, Thruxton, British F3, 1994

After starting in racing through karting in his home land of Belgium in 1986, Radermecker drove in the Benelux Formula Ford Championship. He was champion in his second year in the series in 1991. In 1992, he raced in Great Britain, with a drive in the British Formula Ford Championship, finishing fourth on points. He finished as runner-up in the 1993 Formula Opel Euroseries, before returning to Britain with Formula 3. He finished as runner-up again, moving to race a part season in the 1995 German Formula 3 Championship a year later. In 1997, he switched to saloon cars, racing in the Belgian ProCar Championship. He finished third on points driving a Peugeot 406. In 1998, he changed his car to a Peugeot 306, ending the season in fifth place.

=== BTCC ===
In 1999, Radermecker got a drive in the British Touring Car Championship with the successful Volvo works team in a Volvo S40. He replaced Gianni Morbidelli in the team, who had a poor year in 1998, alongside defending champion Rickard Rydell. In a year of mixed fortunes including five podiums, he finished the championship in eighth place. With half the manufacturers leaving the BTCC in 2000, including Volvo, Radermecker found himself with a seat in the Vauxhall Team. It was not a good year for him, as the third driver in the team behind Yvan Muller and Jason Plato. He finished in tenth place, the lowest placed works driver.

Radermecker was set to return to the BTCC during the 2001 Season in a Lexus IS200 but this never happened.

=== Return to Belgium ===
With the end of the Super Touring era in the BTCC, Radermecker returned to the 2001 ProCar Championship in Belgium. He won the series driving an Opel Astra. He finished second in the French Super Touring Championship in 2002. On return to Belgium in 2005, he won the Belgian Touring Car Championship.

=== Recent years ===
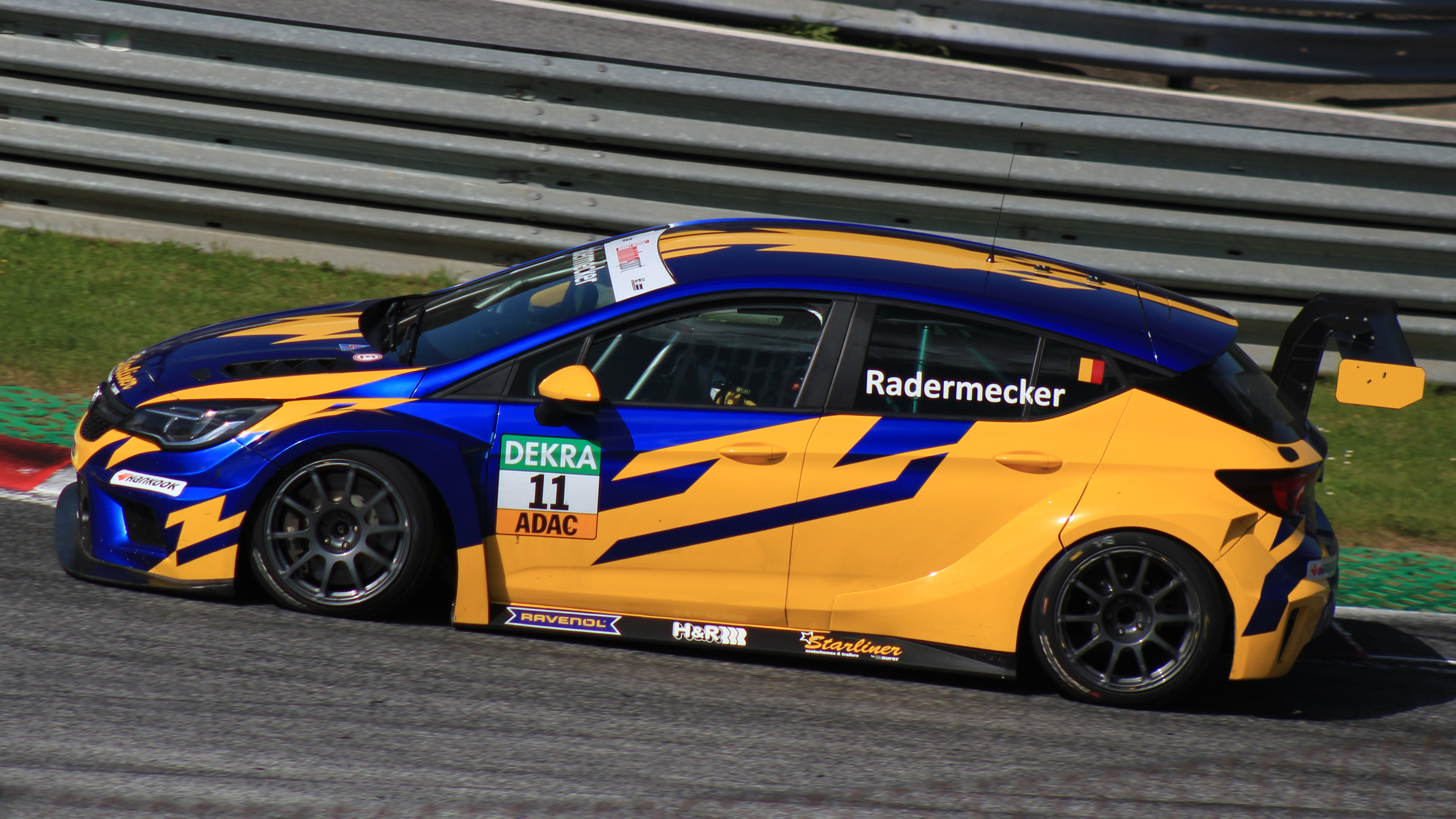
Radermecker driving the Maurer Motorsport Opel Astra TCR at the Red Bull Ring during the 2022 TCR Germany Touring Car Championship season.

Since 2004, Radermecker has driven in selected races in the FIA GT Championship, in various cars including a Nissan 350 Z, a Corvette C5R and a Mosler MT 900. In 2008 he drove a Ferrari 430 GT3 for Exagon Engineering, as well as a full season in the Belgian GT Championship. He has also done some Touring Car racing, winning the 2006 ADAC Procar Series in Germany, combined with selected rounds of the 2006 World Touring Car Championship with Maurer Motorsport. He returned to the WTCC at the Zolder round in 2010.

== Racing record ==
=== Complete British Touring Car Championship results ===
(key) (Races in bold indicate pole position – 1 point awarded all races) (Races in italics indicate fastest lap) (* signifies that driver lead feature race for at least one lap – 1 point awarded)

Year	Team	Car	Class	1	2	3	4	5	6	7	8	9	10	11	12	13	14	15	16	17	18	19	20	21	22	23	24	25	26	DC	Pts
1999	Volvo S40 Racing	Volvo S40		DON; 1; 10	DON; 2; 5	SIL; 1; 11	SIL; 2 Ret	THR; 1; 4	THR; 2; 3	BRH; 1 Ret	BRH; 2 Ret	OUL; 1; 5	OUL; 2; 4*	DON; 1; 9	DON; 2; 12	CRO; 1; 7	CRO; 2; 7	SNE; 1; 3	SNE; 2; 5	THR; 1; 3	THR; 2; 2	KNO; 1; 11	KNO; 2; 8	BRH; 1; 10	BRH; 2; 7	OUL; 1; 4	OUL; 2; 13	SIL; 1 Ret	SIL; 2; 4	8th	113
2000	Vauxhall Motorsport	Vauxhall Vectra	S	BRH; 1 ovr:8 cls:8	BRH; 2 ovr:5 cls:5	DON; 1 ovr:7 cls:7	DON; 2 Ret	THR; 1 ovr:5 cls:5	THR; 2 Ret*	KNO; 1 ovr:9 cls:9	KNO; 2 ovr:6 cls:6	OUL; 1 ovr:2 cls:2	OUL; 2 ovr:7 cls:7	SIL; 1 ovr:6 cls:6	SIL; 2 Ret	CRO; 1 ovr:9 cls:9	CRO; 2 Ret‡	SNE; 1 Ret	SNE; 2 DNS	DON; 1 ovr:9 cls:9	DON; 2 ovr:8 cls:8	BRH; 1 ovr:10 cls:10	BRH; 2 ovr:7 cls:7	OUL; 1 ovr:6 cls:6	OUL; 2 Ret	SIL; 1 ovr:4 cls:4	SIL; 2 ovr:4 cls:4			10th	81

‡ Retired before second start of race

=== Complete World Touring Car Championship results ===
(key) (Races in bold indicate pole position) (Races in italics indicate fastest lap)

Year	Team	Car	1	2	3	4	5	6	7	8	9	10	11	12	13	14	15	16	17	18	19	20	21	22	DC	Points
2006	Maurer Motorsport	Chevrolet Lacetti	ITA; 1	ITA; 2	FRA; 1	FRA; 2	GBR; 1	GBR; 2	GER; 1	GER; 2	BRA; 1	BRA; 2	MEX; 1	MEX; 2	CZE; 1; 19	CZE; 2; 13	TUR; 1	TUR; 2	ESP; 1; 18	ESP; 2; 14	MAC; 1	MAC; 2			NC	0
2010	Chevrolet	Chevrolet Cruze	BRA; 1	BRA; 2	MAR; 1	MAR; 2	ITA; 1	ITA; 2	BEL; 1; 17	BEL; 2; 14	POR; 1	POR; 2	GBR; 1	GBR; 2	CZE; 1	CZE; 2	GER; 1	GER; 2	ESP; 1	ESP; 2	JPN; 1	JPN; 2	MAC; 1	MAC; 2	NC	0

=== Complete 24 Hours of Spa results ===
Year	Team	Co-Drivers	Car	Class	Laps	Pos.	Class Pos.
1995	(Belgium) Honda Team ZVM	(Belgium) Damien van de Poele (Belgium) Hervé Maillien	Honda Civic	Procar	?/Cardan joint	DNF	DNF
1996	(Belgium) Renault Belga Team	(Belgium) Thierry Bouillon (Belgium) Eric Quadedpeerds	Renault Clio 16V	Spa 1.6	?/Fixing	DNF	DNF
1998	(Belgium) Peugeot Belgique	(Belgium) Thierry van Dalen (Belgium) Frédéric Bouvy	Peugeot 306 GTi	SP	?/Non-regulatory entry	DNF	DNF
2000	(Belgium) Peugeot Team Belgique Luxembourg	(Belgium) Jeffrey van Hooydonk (Belgium) Eric van de Poele	Peugeot 306 GTi	SP	?/Gear selector	DNF	DNF
2004	(United Kingdom) RJN Motorsport	(New Zealand) Neil Cunningham (United Kingdom) Chris Buncombe (Sweden) Carl Rosenblad	Nissan 350Z	N-GT	49/Brakes	DNF	DNF
2006	(Belgium) PSI Experience	(Finland) Pertti Kuismanen (Finland) Markus Palttala (Belgium) Bernard Delhez	Chevrolet Corvette C5-R	GT1	530	11th	7th
2007	(Belgium) Gravity Racing International	(Belgium) David Dermont (Belgium) Olivier Muytjens (Belgium) Loris de Sordi	Mosler MT900R	G2	448	22nd	2nd
2008	(France) Exagon Engineering	(France) Eric Hélary (France) Daniel Desbruères (France) Catherine Desbruères	Ferrari F430 GT3	G3	31/DNF	DNF	DNF
2009	(Belgium) Gravity Racing International	(China) Ho-Pin Tung (Belgium) Loris de Sordi (Canada) Jacques Villeneuve	Mosler MT900R	G2	65/DNF	DNF	DNF
2010	(Belgium) Gravity Racing International	(France) Romain Grosjean (Italy) Diego Alessi (Netherlands) Ron Marchal	Mosler MT900R	GTN	466	16th	3rd
2014	(Belgium) Belgian Audi Club Team WRT	(France) Jean-Luc Blanchemain (Belgium) Christian Kelders (Belgium) Frédéric Bouvy	Audi R8 LMS ultra	Pro-Am	506	20th	9th

=== TCR Spa 500 results ===
Year	Team	Co-Drivers	Car	Class	Laps	Pos.	Class Pos.
2019	(Belgium) AC Motorsport	(Belgium) Mathieu Detry (United Kingdom) Stewart Lines (France) Stéphane Perrin	Audi RS 3 LMS TCR	**PA**	439	5th	**2nd**

Sporting positions
Preceded by Mathias Schläppi	ADAC Procar Series Champion; 2006	Succeeded by Franz Engstler
