= Luca Rangoni =

Italian auto racing driver (born 1968)

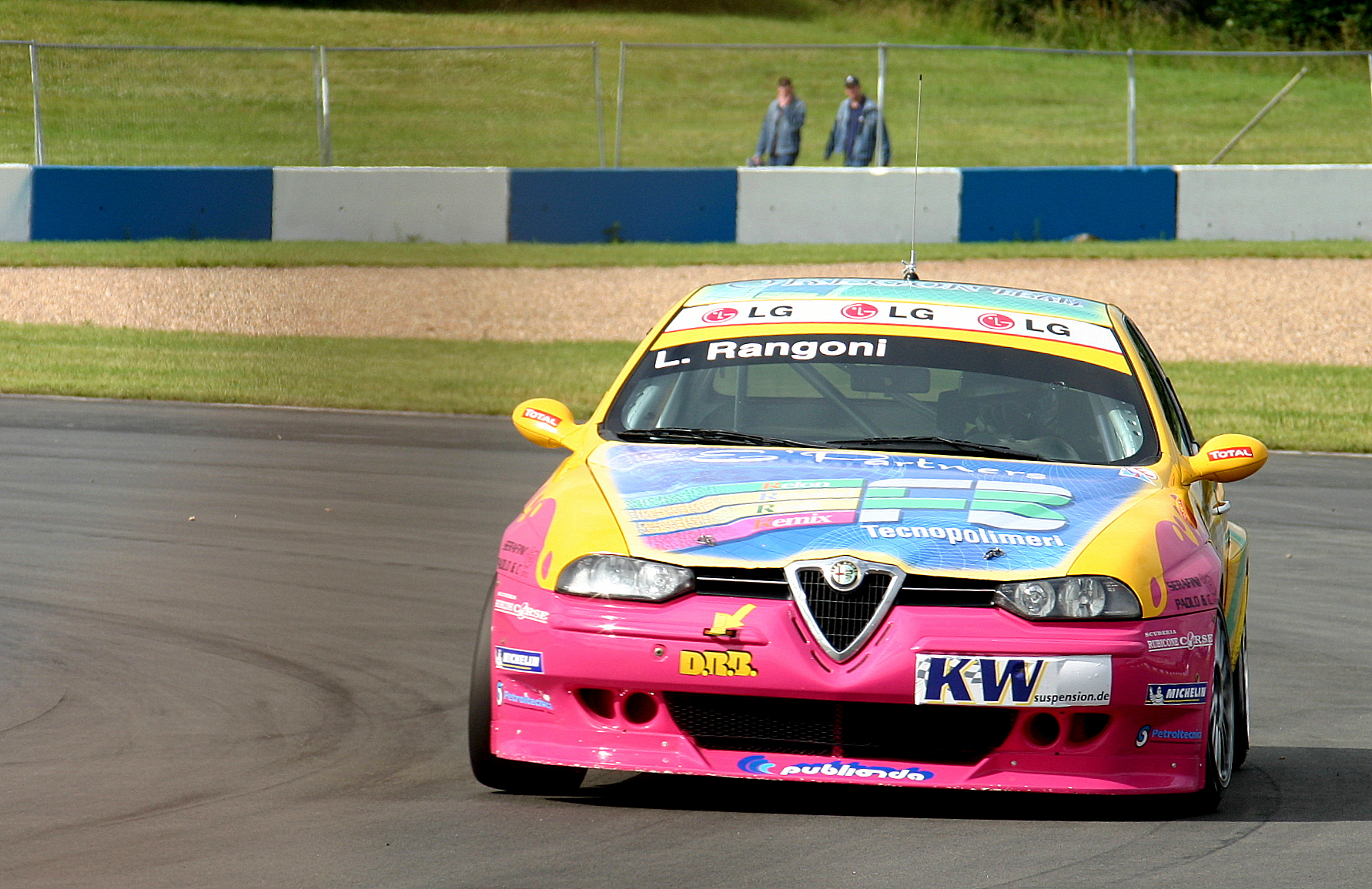
- Rangoni in an Alfa Romeo 156 during the 2004 European Touring Car Championship season
- Nationality: (Italy) Italian
- Born: 23 September 1968 (age 58) Bologna, Italy

World Touring Car Championship career
- Debut season: 2006
- Categorisation: FIA Gold (until 2015); FIA Silver (2016–2024); FIA Bronze (2025–)
- Former teams: Proteam Motorsport
- Starts: 41
- Wins: 0
- Poles: 0
- Fastest laps: 0
- Best finish: 14th in 2007

Previous series
- 1995 1996 2004: Italian F3 Championship; International F3000 Championship; European Touring Car Championship

Championship titles
- 1995 2000-2003: Italian F3 Championship; Renault Sport Clio International Trophy

Luca Rangoni (born 23 September 1968 in Bologna) is an Italian former auto racing driver. He is a married man with one son and one daughter.

== Early career ==
Like many racing drivers, Rangoni's first taste of racing was in karts, where he spent four years. He made his debut in circuit racing in the 1989 Italian Formula Alfa Boxer Championship, where he finished sixth on points. This was followed by two years in the Italian F2000 Trophy, which he won in his second year in 1991.

In 1993, Rangoni competed in the Italian Formula Three Championship, winning the title in 1995 in a Dallara-Fiat. His success the previous year led to a drive in the 1996 FIA International F3000 Championship. Despite only entering one round in Pau, he ended the year in seventeenth after coming sixth in the race. After his time in Formula 3000 he took a break from racing due to a family tragedy.

== Touring cars ==
Rangoni returned to racing in 1999, switching to touring cars with the Renault Sport Clio International Trophy. He dominated the championship, winning four back to back titles between 2000 and 2003.

In 2004, Rangoni found a drive in the FIA European Touring Car Championship. Entereing an Alfa Romeo 156, he finished the series in 16th position overall. He returned to the newly named FIA World Touring Car Championship in 2006 for Proteam Motorsport in a BMW 320i. He ended the season in 19th overall, including a podium finish in Valencia, and was runner-up the Yokohama Independents Trophy, behind Tom Coronel, with two wins.

For 2007, Rangoni stayed with Proteam, finishing the year in 14th after another overall podium, one place ahead of works BMW driver and fellow Italian Alessandro Zanardi, and lost the title to the Yokohama Independents Trophy to Stefano D'Aste by two points, in spite of scoring nine wins (including the double points rounds at Macau) to D'Aste's three. For 2008, he raced in the Italian Porsche Carrera Cup, finishing as runner-up, and also raced in the Superstars Series.

== Racing record ==
=== Complete International Formula 3000 results ===
(key) (Races in bold indicate pole position) (Races in italics indicate fastest lap)

Year	Entrant	1	2	3	4	5	6	7	8	9	10	DC	Points
1996	Shannon Racing	NÜR	PAU; 6	PER	HOC	SIL	SPA	MAG	EST	MUG	HOC	18th	1

=== Complete European Touring Car Championship results ===
(key) (Races in bold indicate pole position) (Races in italics indicate fastest lap)

Year	Team	Car	1	2	3	4	5	6	7	8	9	10	11	12	13	14	15	16	17	18	19	20	DC	Pts
2004	Oregon Team	Alfa Romeo 156 GTA	MNZ; 1 NC	MNZ; 2; 17	VAL; 1; 19	VAL; 2; 8	MAG; 1; 18	MAG; 2 Ret	HOC; 1; 7	HOC; 2; 7	BRN; 1; 10	BRN; 2 Ret	DON; 1; 14	DON; 2 Ret	SPA; 1; 13	SPA; 2; 14	IMO; 1 Ret	IMO; 2; 9	OSC; 1; 24	OSC; 2; 9	DUB; 1; 8	DUB; 2; 10	**16th**	**6**

=== Complete World Touring Car Championship results ===
(key) (Races in bold indicate pole position) (Races in italics indicate fastest lap)

Year	Team	Car	1	2	3	4	5	6	7	8	9	10	11	12	13	14	15	16	17	18	19	20	21	22	DC	Points
2006	Proteam Motorsport	BMW 320si	ITA; 1; 15	ITA; 2 Ret	FRA; 1; 12	FRA; 2; 21	GBR; 1; 20	GBR; 2; 15	GER; 1; 17	GER; 2; 23	BRA; 1; 17	BRA; 2 Ret	MEX; 1; 23	MEX; 2; 12	CZE; 1 Ret	CZE; 2; 12	TUR; 1; 21	TUR; 2; 21	ESP; 1; 2	ESP; 2; 3	MAC; 1; 20	MAC; 2; 12			19th	14
2007	Scuderia Proteam Motorsport	BMW 320si	BRA; 1 Ret	BRA; 2; 7	NED; 1; 3	NED; 2; 6	ESP; 1; 7	ESP; 2; 7	FRA; 1 Ret	FRA; 2; 17	CZE; 1; 18	CZE; 2 Ret	POR; 1; 20	POR; 2; 12	SWE; 1; 17	SWE; 2; 20	GER; 1; 16	GER; 2; 18	GBR; 1; 16	GBR; 2; 21	ITA; 1; 10	ITA; 2 DNS	MAC; 1; 17	MAC; 2; 10	14th	15

=== Complete TCR International Series results ===
(key) (Races in bold indicate pole position) (Races in italics indicate fastest lap)

Year	Team	Car	1	2	3	4	5	6	7	8	9	10	11	12	13	14	15	16	17	18	19	20	21	22	DC	Points
2015	Top Run Motorsport	Subaru Impreza STi TCR	MYS; 1	MYS; 2	CHN; 1	CHN; 2	ESP; 1	ESP; 2	POR; 1	POR; 2	ITA; 1	ITA; 2	AUT; 1	AUT; 2	RUS; 1	RUS; 2	RBR; 1	RBR; 2	SIN; 1; 15	SIN; 2 Ret	THA; 1	THA; 2	MAC; 1	MAC; 2	NC	0
2016	Top Run Motorsport	Subaru Impreza STi TCR	BHR; 1	BHR; 2	POR; 1 Ret	POR; 2; 15†	BEL; 1	BEL; 2	ITA; 1	ITA; 2	AUT; 1	AUT; 2	GER; 1	GER; 2	RUS; 1	RUS; 2	THA; 1	THA; 2	SIN; 1	SIN; 2	MYS; 1	MYS; 2	MAC; 1	MAC; 2	NC	0

^{†} Driver did not finish the race, but was classified as he completed over 90% of the race distance.

Sporting positions
Preceded by Giancarlo Fisichella	Italian Formula Three Champion; 1995	Succeeded by Andrea Boldrini
Preceded by Jérôme Policand	Renault Sport Clio Trophy Champion; 2000-2003	Succeeded by Jan Heylen (Eurocup Mégane Trophy)
