= Ryan Sharp =

Scottish racing driver

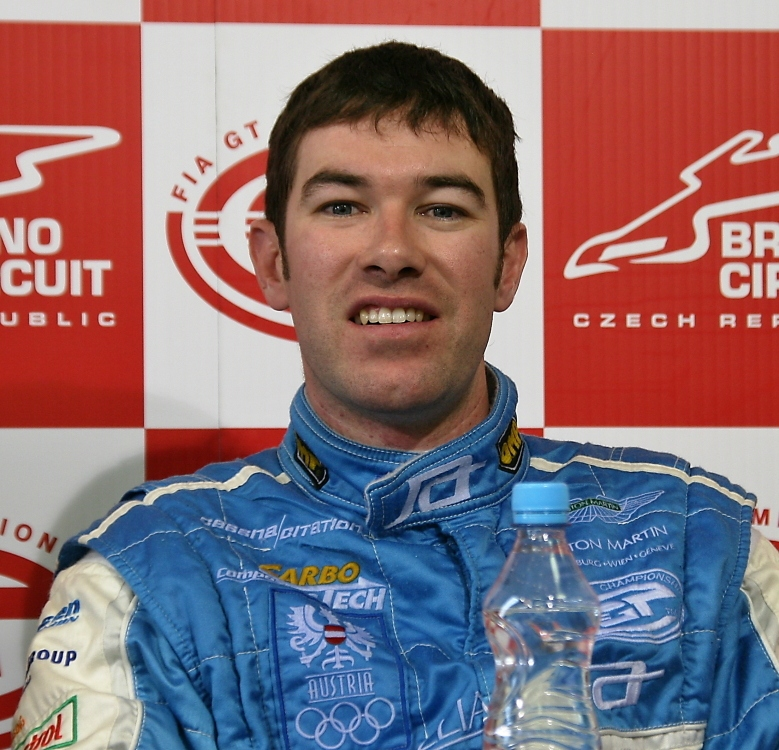
- Nationality: (United Kingdom) British
- Born: 29 April 1979 (age 47) Newtonhill, Scotland

FIA GT Championship career
- Debut season: 2007
- Current team: Jetalliance Racing
- Categorisation: FIA Gold (until 2015); FIA Silver (2016–)
- Starts: 12
- Wins: 5
- Poles: 0
- Best finish: 1st in 2007

Previous series
- 2006 2005 2005 2003–2004 2003 2003 2002–2003 2001–2002 2000–2001: World Touring Car Championship; GP2 Series; World Series by Renault; Formula Renault V6 Eurocup; Formula Renault 2.0 Germany; Formula Renault 2.0 Italia; Eurocup Formula Renault 2.0; Formula Renault 2.0 UK; British Formula Ford

Championship titles
- 2003: Formula Renault 2.0 Germany

Ryan Sharp (born 29 April 1979 in Newtonhill, Scotland) is a Scottish former racing driver and team manager. He raced in the FIA GT Championship in 2007 with JetAlliance Racing in their lead No. 33 Aston Martin DBR9 – with ex-F1 Driver Karl Wendlinger as his teammate. Sharp was also the 2003 German Formula Renault champion. He is currently the director of Hitech Racing.

== Career history ==
Sharp's career began in Karting. After winning a number of local and national Karting events his talent was spotted by Dutch businessman Klass Zwart. Zwart funded Ryan's first season of car racing in Junior Formula Ford. Ryan progressed well despite limited funding to compete, and in 2002 moved from Formula Ford to the Formula Renault Championship, a 'slicks and wings' series, as compared to Formula Ford which does not allow aerodynamic wings.

=== Formula Renault ===
Sharp's first season in Formula Renault was in the UK, with the John Village Automotive team. He finished sixth in the championship. Ironically, his consistency in finishing every race in the points dropped him to 6th due to the Formula Renault system of dropping your lowest score through the season – meaning Ryan had to drop points while those around him dropped a '0' they had scored during the season.

For 2003, Sharp moved out of the United Kingdom to race in Formula Renault in Germany with the Jenzer Motorsport team. The move paid off handsomely, and with a lot of work and input by Jenzer Motorsport, Ryan won the championship by 40 points, and performed well in the Formula Renault Masters event at Donington in October 2003 by winning the first of the two races, and finishing third in the second. He was leading the second race, but a backmarker caused a red flag and on countback Sharp was classified third. Accomplished British racer Lewis Hamilton came over to Germany during the season to race with the German Formula Renault grid. Sharp won both of the races and Hamilton finished ninth and eighth respectively.

Sharp also took part in a round of the Italian Formula Renault championship at Spa, in Belgium. Running in another competitive field (considered by some to be the most competitive Renault championship in the world) at a circuit new to him in the pouring rain, Sharp went on to win race 1 by 12 seconds and was on course to win the second until he made an error and damaged his car, failing to finish that race but performing well under the wet weather conditions.

=== Formula Renault v6 ===
2004 saw Sharp continue his relationship with the highly rated Jenzer Motorsport team, but moving up to the Formula Renault V6 Eurocup. The season started quite well, when he finished third and first at the first weekend (third in Race 1 after spinning at Turn 1 and dropping right to the back of the field), and then achieving two-second places at the following races in Valencia. In the course of one of the two races, Sharp appeared to have an invincible lead of four seconds in the race with one lap to go. However, the four-second lead was lost in the last lap allowing Sharp to finish second. Losing places during the last section of the races was common for Ryan during this season and it was thought to be related to a general lack of fitness and mounting driver nerves towards the end of the race. Sharp had a lot to focus on and learn and an amount of inexperience at this level meant his tyres were being worked too hard and he lost pace at the end of both races. As a result, he was passed by Damien Pasini and Robbie Kerr who won these races. Nevertheless, these first 4 rounds left him with a commanding lead at the head of the championship. The season moved to Magny Cours where Sharp consolidated his championship lead. At the F1 support race at Monaco a car failure caused him a loss of valuable points in the championship. A disappointing performance due to a loss in the family at Brno followed reducing Sharp's lead as a contender. Eventually, Sharp lost the championship to Swiss/French driver Giorgio Mondini by 22 points.

=== GP2 Series ===
Sharp moved up to the new GP2 Series in 2005 with David Price Racing, a team he had raced against in 2004 and who were very impressed with his performance. The season began in Imola where the cars had teething trouble with clutches. In the second round at Barcelona, Sharp was on course for a third-place finish when his car failed forcing him to start at the back of the grid for the second race. In this race, he set the fastest lap and gained one point. A series of disappointing performances followed which could be attributed to the team being poorly engineered and set up. With his hopes diminished, he returned to the team he knew and trusted. Leaving the GP2 series, he returned to Jenzer Motorsport to compete in the last few rounds of the Formula Renault 3.5 championship, and almost immediately his performances improved. This demonstrated that the David Price Racing car used in the GP2 series was not a competitive car, and that Jenzer Motorsprt was a top team. Sharp was replaced at DPR by 2004 FRenault v6 Champion Giorgio Mondini, who also struggled to get anything out of the car.

=== World Touring Car Championship (WTCC) ===
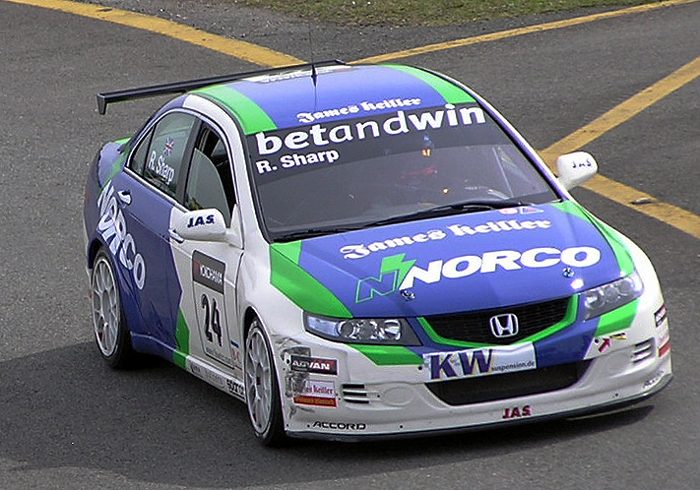
Sharp driving the Honda Accord Euro R at the WTCC Race in Curitiba.

Sharp's career took a new direction in 2006 – signing for the Italian JAS Motorsport team to contest the World Touring Car Championship, running as an Independent in the Yokohama Independent Trophy. He impressed many people in this season, becoming the first Independent driver to score an overall podium position in the season, finishing 3rd overall in Race 1 at Puebla, Mexico. Sharp won a number of races during the season (class victories), the most memorable being one of the races at Brands Hatch, UK – where he won in the pouring rain, underlining his wet weather driving skills. He was on course to finish 2nd in the championship behind Dutchman Tom Coronel, but had to miss the last three rounds of the Championship due to budget issues (the last round had double points, so it was effectively 4 rounds/a maximum of 80 points missed out on). At the end of the year he won the European Touring Car Cup in a SEAT Leon for GR Asia.

=== FIA GT Championship ===
Sharp moved again in 2007, to the FIA GT Championship with Austrian team JetAlliance Racing, who were only in their second season of competition. The season began in Zhuhai in China, where the car finished ninth – this was followed by two fourth-place finishes at Silverstone and Bucharest. The improvement in form continued to the next race in Monza where the duo won a dramatic race. Oschersleben held no such luck as the car was hit at the start of the race, dropping him to the back, where he eventually retired. The last race they took part in was the Total 24 Hours of Spa, in which his car qualified second on the grid and ran very well. He was leading at the six-hour mark, and so was awarded half points for a race win which amounted to five points. However, the car retired around 40 minutes after this and the duo lost more points in the championship race. A strong finish to the season, including two further wins in Adria, in the night race, and by teammate Zolder in the tenth and final round. This resulted in Sharp and teammate Wendlinger shoot up the standings to finish second in the championship, four points behind eventual champion, Tomas Biagi.

=== Later career ===
After finishing car racing, Sharp returned to local kart racing in Britain, winning several Scottish and British championships during this time. He retired fully at the end of 2017 to focus on his seven-year-old son Aston, who started karting professionally.

== Racing record ==
=== Complete Formula Renault 2.0 UK results ===
(key) (Races in bold indicate pole position) (Races in italics indicate fastest lap)

Year	Entrant	1	2	3	4	5	6	7	8	9	10	11	12	13	DC	Points
2001	Fortec Motorsports	BHI	THR	OUL	SIL	DON	KNO	SNE	CRO	OUL	SIL	SIL	DON; 6	BGP	31st	18
2002	John Village Automotive	BRH; 13	OUL; 2	THR; 7	SIL; 5	THR; 5	BRH; 4	CRO; 7	SNE; 11	SNE; 12	KNO; 8	BRH; 5	DON; 16	DON; 2	6th	211

=== Complete Formula Renault 2.0 Germany results ===
(key) (Races in bold indicate pole position) (Races in italics indicate fastest lap)

Year	Entrant	1	2	3	4	5	6	7	8	9	10	11	12	13	14	DC	Points
2003	Jenzer Motorsport	OSC; 1; 3	OSC; 2; 4	**HOC**; **1**; 1	**HOC**; **2**; 1	NÜR; 1; 1	NÜR; 2; 2	**SAL**; **1**; 1	SAL; 2; 3	**A1R**; **1**; 2	**A1R**; **2**; 4	OSC; 1; 10	OSC; 2; 28	**LAU**; **1**; 1	LAU; 2; 4	1st	300

=== Complete Formula Renault 2.0 Italia results ===
(key) (Races in bold indicate pole position) (Races in italics indicate fastest lap)

Year	Entrant	1	2	3	4	5	6	7	8	9	10	11	12	DC	Points
2003	Jenzer Motorsport	VLL	VLL	MAG	SPA; 1	SPA; Ret	A1R	A1R	MIS	MIS	VAR	ADR	MNZ	11th	31

=== Complete Formula Renault 2.0 Eurocup results ===
(key) (Races in bold indicate pole position) (Races in italics indicate fastest lap)

Year	Entrant	1	2	3	4	5	6	7	8	DC	Points
2003	Jenzer Motorsport	BRN; 1; 6	BRN; 2; 25	**ASS**; **1**; 2	ASS; 2; 6	OSC; 1 Ret	OSC; 2; 7	DON; 1; 1	DON; 2; 3	5th	78

=== Complete Formula Renault V6 Eurocup results ===
(key) (Races in bold indicate pole position) (Races in italics indicate fastest lap)

Year	Entrant	1	2	3	4	5	6	7	8	9	10	11	12	13	14	15	16	17	18	19	DC	Points
2003	SRTS	CAT; 1	CAT; 2	MAG; 1	MAG; 2	MON	DON; 1	DON; 2	SPA1	SPA2; 1	SPA2; 2	SCA; 1	SCA; 2	OSC; 1	OSC; 2	EST; 1	EST; 2	MNZ; 1; 9	MNZ; 2; 14		23rd	4
2004	Jenzer Motorsport	MNZ; 1; 3	MNZ; 2; 1	**VAL**; **1**; 2	VAL; 2; 2	MAG; 1; 3	MAG; 2; 8	MON; Ret	BRN; 1; 7	BRN; 2; 9	DON; 1; 3	DON; 2; 11	SPA; 1; 5	SPA; 2; 1	IMO; 1; 6	IMO; 2; 3	OSC; 1; 4	OSC; 2; 2	DUB; 1; 5	DUB; 2; 10	2nd	271

=== Complete GP2 series results ===
(key) (Races in bold indicate pole position) (Races in italics indicate fastest lap)

Year	Entrant	1	2	3	4	5	6	7	8	9	10	11	12	13	14	15	16	17	18	19	20	21	22	23	DC	Points
2005	DPR	IMO; FEA; Ret	IMO; SPR; 14	CAT; FEA; Ret	CAT; SPR; 16	MON; FEA; Ret	NÜR; FEA; 9	NÜR; SPR; 9	MAG; FEA; 19	MAG; SPR; Ret	SIL; FEA; Ret	SIL; SPR; NC	HOC; FEA; 11	HOC; SPR; 13	HUN; FEA	HUN; SPR	IST; FEA	IST; SPR	MNZ; FEA	MNZ; SPR	SPA; FEA	SPA; SPR	BHR; FEA	BHR; SPR	23rd	2

=== Complete Formula Renault 3.5 Series results ===
(key) (Races in bold indicate pole position) (Races in italics indicate fastest lap)

Year	Entrant	1	2	3	4	5	6	7	8	9	10	11	12	13	14	15	16	17	DC	Points
2005	Jenzer Motorsport	ZOL; 1	ZOL; 2	MON; 1	VAL; 1	VAL; 2	LMS; 1	LMS; 2	BIL; 1; 14	BIL; 2; 9	OSC; 1; 9	OSC; 2; 18†	DON; 1; 16	DON; 2 Ret	EST; 1; 24	EST; 2 Ret	MNZ; 1 Ret	MNZ; 2; 7	21st	8

^{†} Driver did not finish the race, but was classified as he completed more than 90% of the race distance.

=== Complete World Touring Car Championship results ===
(key) (Races in bold indicate pole position) (Races in italics indicate fastest lap)

Year	Team	Car	1	2	3	4	5	6	7	8	9	10	11	12	13	14	15	16	17	18	19	20	DC	Points
2006	JAS Motorsport	Honda Accord Euro R	ITA; 1; 18	ITA; 2; 14	FRA; 1; 22	FRA; 2 Ret	GBR; 1; 16	GBR; 2; 13	GER; 1; 25	GER; 2; 18	BRA; 1; 12	BRA; 2; 12	MEX; 1; 3	MEX; 2 Ret	CZE; 1; 12	CZE; 2; 17	TUR; 1	TUR; 2	ESP; 1	ESP; 2	MAC; 1	MAC; 2	21st	6

== See also ==
- 2007 FIA GT Championship season
- JetAlliance Racing
- Karl Wendlinger

Sporting positions
Preceded by Christian Klien	German Formula Renault champion 2003	Succeeded by Scott Speed
Preceded by Richard Göransson	European Touring Car Cup Champion; 2006	Succeeded by Michel Nykjaer
