= Peter Terting =

German racing driver (born 1984)

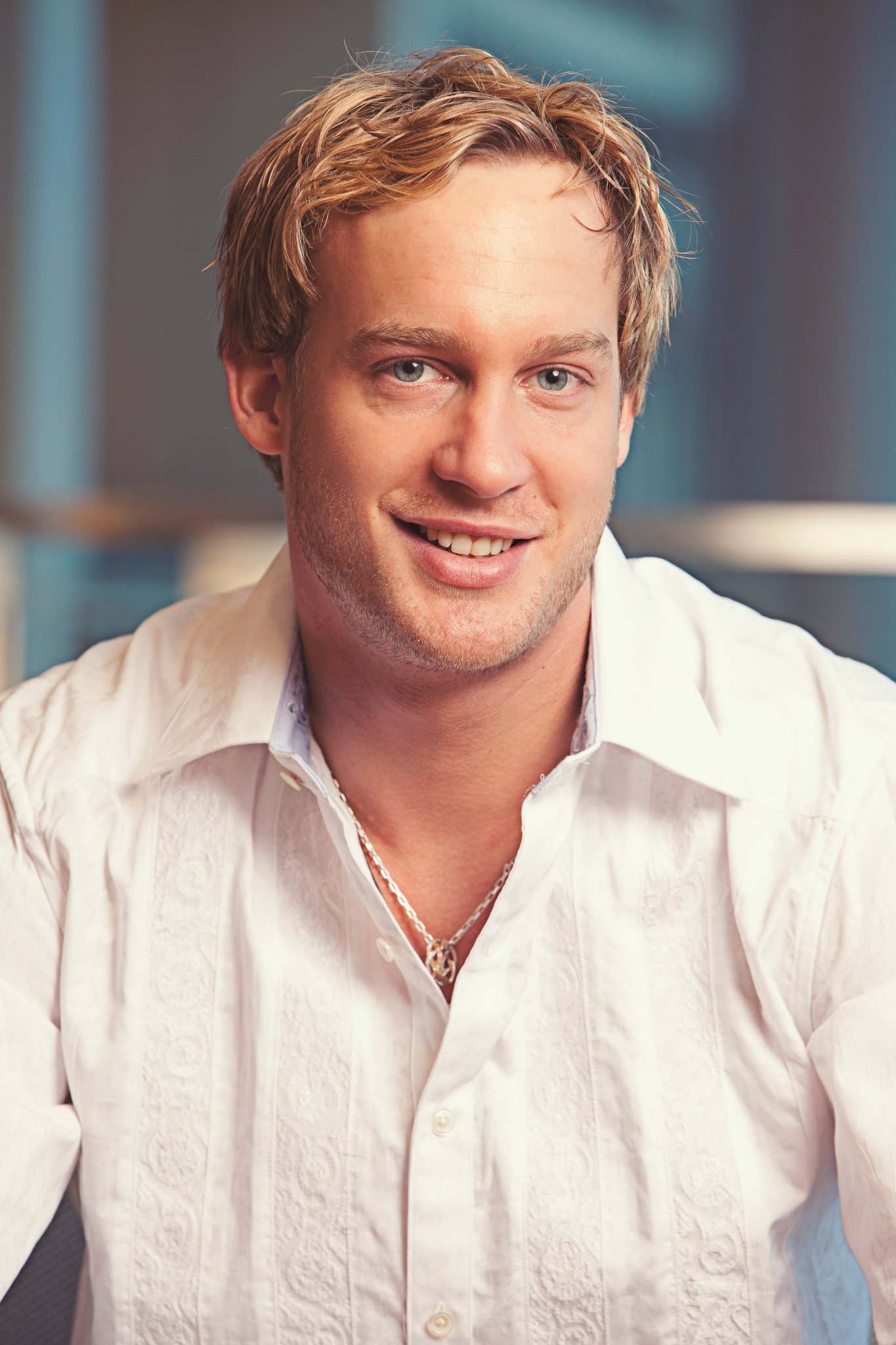
- Nationality: German
- Born: 19 February 1984 (age 42) Kempten im Allgäu, Bavaria, Germany

Deutsche Tourenwagen Masters
- Categorisation: FIA Platinum (until 2011); FIA Gold (2012–)
- Years active: 2003
- Teams: Abt Sportsline
- Starts: 10
- Wins: 0
- Poles: 0
- Fastest laps: 0
- Best finish: 17th in 2003

Peter Terting (born on 19 February 1984 in Kempten) is a German auto racing driver.

== Biography ==
Terting won the Volkswagen Lupo Cup in 2002, earning him a DTM drive for Abt Sportsline in 2003, although this proved to be too big a step up, and the teenager struggled to be competitive.

After winning the 2004 German SEAT León Championship, Terting earned a full-time drive in the World Touring Car Championship (WTCC) for SEAT, joining Rickard Rydell and Jordi Gené. He finished 12th overall, which included taking his first win in Mexico City, having finished seventh in race 1 and thus started second in race 2 (the top-eight positions on the grid are reversed for the second race of the meeting) . For 2006, he raced for SEAT's Team Deutschland in the WTCC, improving to finish ninth overall. In both seasons, he finished 18 of the 20 races.

Terting lost his SEAT drive for the 2007 season. He instead made two starts in International GT Open and two in the Spanish GT Championship in a Sunred Engineering Sunred SR21. He returned to SEAT in WTCC for the final two races of the season. In 2008, Terting again did not have a full-time drive. He made two starts in ADAC GT Masters driving a Kessel Racing Ferrari 430 and drove in the 24 Hours Nürburgring in a R-Line Volkswagen GTI, finishing tenth in class. He also drove a VW in the race in 2010.

=== Personal life ===
Terting was engaged to British racing driver Katherine Legge before entering a relationship with German driver Carrie Schreiner, some 14 years younger than him.

== Racing record ==
=== Complete Deutsche Tourenwagen Masters results ===
(key)

Year	Team	Car	1	2	3	4	5	6	7	8	9	10	Pos	Points
2003	Abt Sportsline Junior	Abt-Audi TT-R 2002	HOC; Ret	ADR; 13	NÜR; 14	LAU; DNS	NOR; 12	DON; 14	NÜR; Ret	A1R; 13	ZAN; 14	HOC; 8	17th	1

=== Complete World Touring Car Championship results ===
(key) (Races in bold indicate pole position) (Races in italics indicate fastest lap)

Year	Team	Car	1	2	3	4	5	6	7	8	9	10	11	12	13	14	15	16	17	18	19	20	21	22	DC	Points
2005	SEAT Sport	SEAT Toledo Cupra	ITA; 1; 11	ITA; 2; 17	FRA; 1; 9	FRA; 2; 10	GBR; 1; 6	GBR; 2; 16	SMR; 1; 10	SMR; 2; 7	MEX; 1; 7	MEX; 2; 1	BEL; 1; 10	BEL; 2; 10	GER; 1; 5	GER; 2 Ret	TUR; 1 NC	TUR; 2; 10							12th	31
2005	SEAT Sport	SEAT León																	ESP; 1; 3	ESP; 2; 12	MAC; 1; 8	**MAC**; **2**; 6			12th	31
2006	SEAT Sport	SEAT León	ITA; 1; 13	ITA; 2; 8	FRA; 1; 6	FRA; 2; 6	GBR; 1; 2	GBR; 2; 18	GER; 1; 8	**GER**; **2**; 4	BRA; 1; 2	BRA; 2; 6	MEX; 1; 9	MEX; 2 Ret	CZE; 1; 10	CZE; 2; 8	TUR; 1; 6	TUR; 2; 2	ESP; 1; 5	ESP; 2; 21	MAC; 1; 8	**MAC**; **2** Ret			9th	49
2007	SEAT Sport	SEAT León	BRA; 1	BRA; 2	NED; 1	NED; 2	ESP; 1	ESP; 2	FRA; 1	FRA; 2	CZE; 1	CZE; 2	POR; 1	POR; 2	SWE; 1	SWE; 2	GER; 1 Ret	GER; 2; 22	GBR; 1	GBR; 2	ITA; 1	ITA; 2	MAC; 1	MAC; 2	NC	0

=== Complete TCR Europe Series results ===
(key) (Races in bold indicate pole position) (Races in italics indicate fastest lap)

Year	Team	Car	1	2	3	4	5	6	7	8	9	10	11	12	13	14	DC	Points
2018	Target Competition	Hyundai i30 N TCR	LEC; 1	LEC; 2	ZAN; 1	ZAN; 2	SPA; 1	SPA; 2	HUN; 1	HUN; 2	ASS; 1; 21†	ASS; 2; 12	MNZ; 1; 8	MNZ; 2; 6	CAT; 1; 10	CAT; 2; 5	20th	23

^{†} Driver did not finish, but was classified as he completed over 75% of the race distance.
