= Salvatore Tavano =

Italian auto racing driver (born 1980)

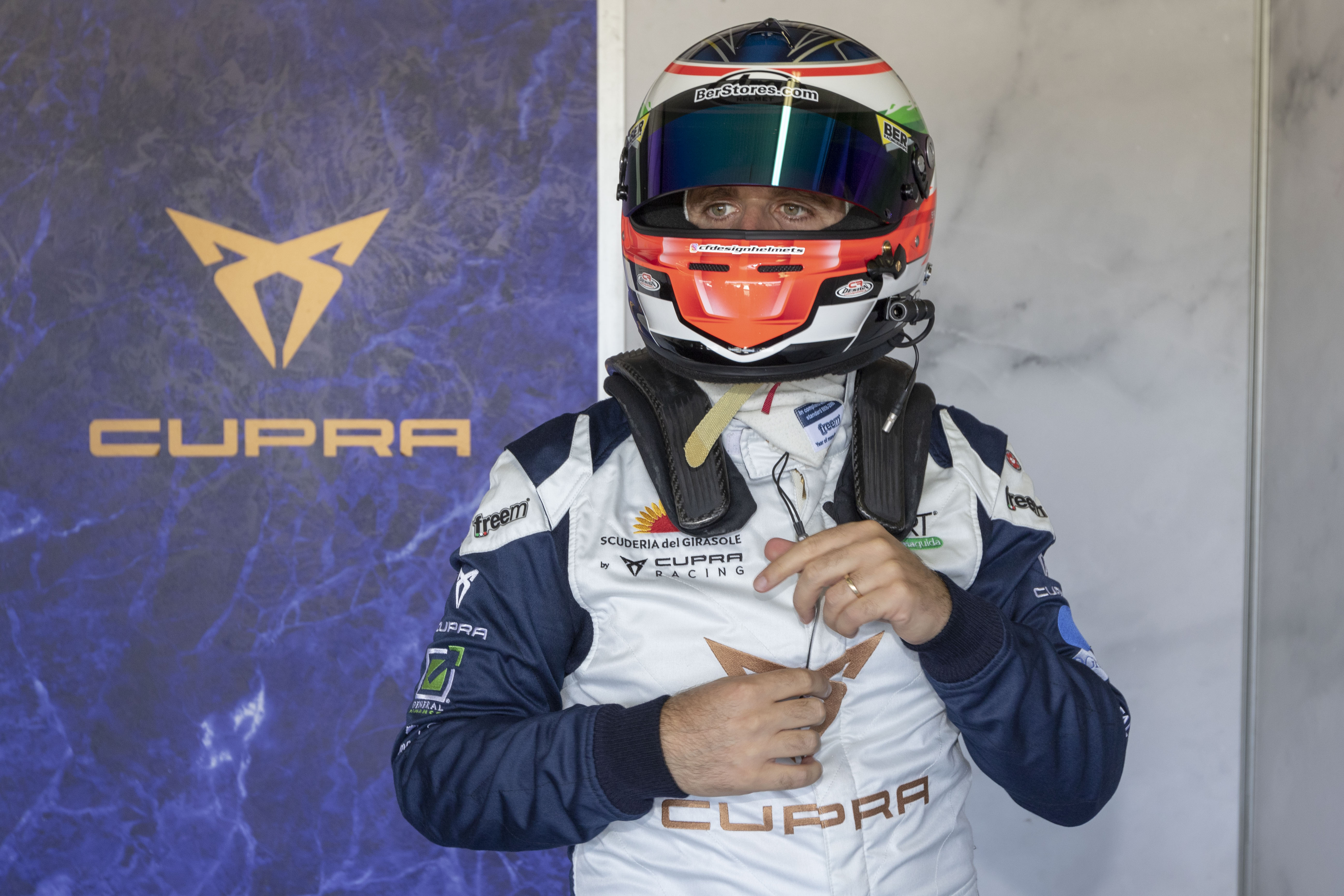
- Tavano in his racing gear in 2021
- Nationality: (Italy) Italian
- Born: 13 March 1980 (age 46) Syracuse, Sicily, Italy
- Categorisation: FIA Gold

Salvatore Tavano (born 13 March 1980 in Siracusa) is an Italian racing driver. He has won the TCR Italy Touring Car Championship in 2018, 2019 and 2020, and has taken part in several seasons in the European Touring Car Championship and World Touring Car Championship.

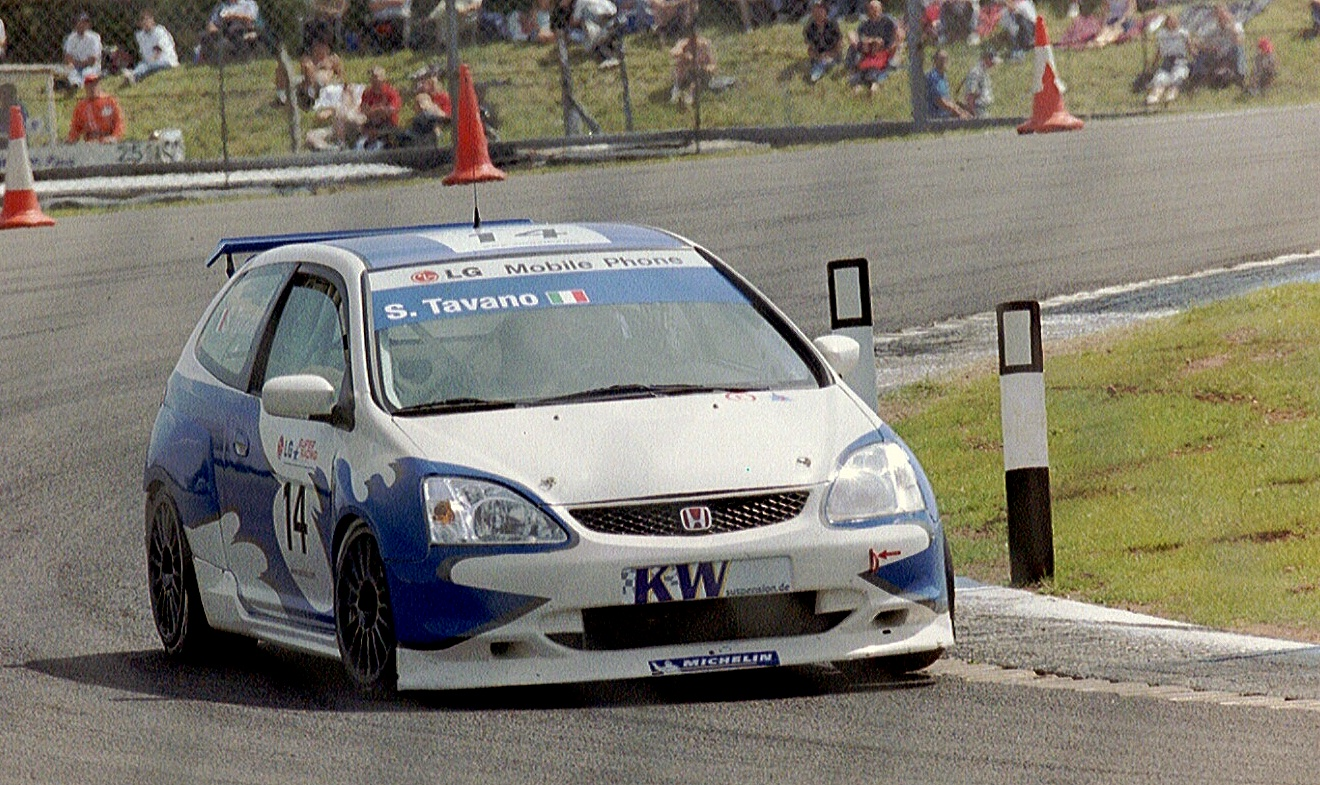
Tavano during the 2003 European Touring Car Championship

== Career ==
After starting his competitive career in karting, Tavano spent two years in the Italian Formula 3 championship. He finished fourth in 1998 and third in 1999. In 2001. he participated in the European Formula 3000 championship, winning the Zolder race and closing the season. with fourth place in the overall standings. In 2005, he finished third in the Italian super-tourism championship. Since 2002, he has spent three years driving in the European Touring Car Championship.

Tavano participated in some rounds of the 2005 World Touring Championship for the DB Motorsport team. In 2006, he competed again in the WTCC for N. Technology on an Alfa Romeo 156, obtaining a victory and finishing the season in eighteenth position.

In 2007, Tavano competed in the Le Mans Series in the GT1 class with a Saleen S7R.

In 2008, Tavano took part in the Italian GT Championship at the wheel of a Ferrari F430 GT2 from the Advanced Eng team. He finished fourth overall with three wins. In the same year, he participated in two races of the GT OPEN championship, always with a Ferrari F430 GT2 of the Advanced Eng team, obtaining a victory.

In 2009, Tavano took part in the 500 Abarth Trophy Championship, becoming Italian Champion with eleven seasonal victories. He won the opportunity to participate in the 500 Abarth trophy European final, winning the victory.

In 2010, Tavano took part in the SEAT Leon Supercopa Italia championship, finishing third with three seasonal victories.

In 2011, Tavano participated in 5 races of the Italian GT Championship at the wheel of a Porsche GT3, obtaining three victories.

From 2009 to 2011, Tavano also participated in some stages of the Mountain Speed Trophy obtaining excellent placings.

In 2012, Tavano participated in some races of the Renault Cup Italy with a Clio Cup, obtaining two victories out of six seasonal participations.

In 2013, Tavano became Vice Champion of the Mini Italia Trophy, obtaining four seasonal victories with his Mini Cooper S.

From 2013 to 2017, Tavano was a pilot-tester for the L.R.M Motors team where he is responsible for Development and Testing. From 2016 to 2017, he was also a coach driver for the L.R.M. Motors for a driver participating in the SEAT Leon Cup Italia Trophy. In the same year, he began his collaboration with SEAT Motorsport Italia as Coordinator in charge of safe and sporty driving instructors and as a test driver.

In 2018, with the birth of the CUPRA brand, the collaboration with Scuderia del Girasole by CUPRA Racing (formerly SEAT Motorsport Italia) begins as Coordinator in charge of safe and sporty driving instructors and as a test driver. It was in this year that he obtained the first TCR Italy Italian Champion Title.

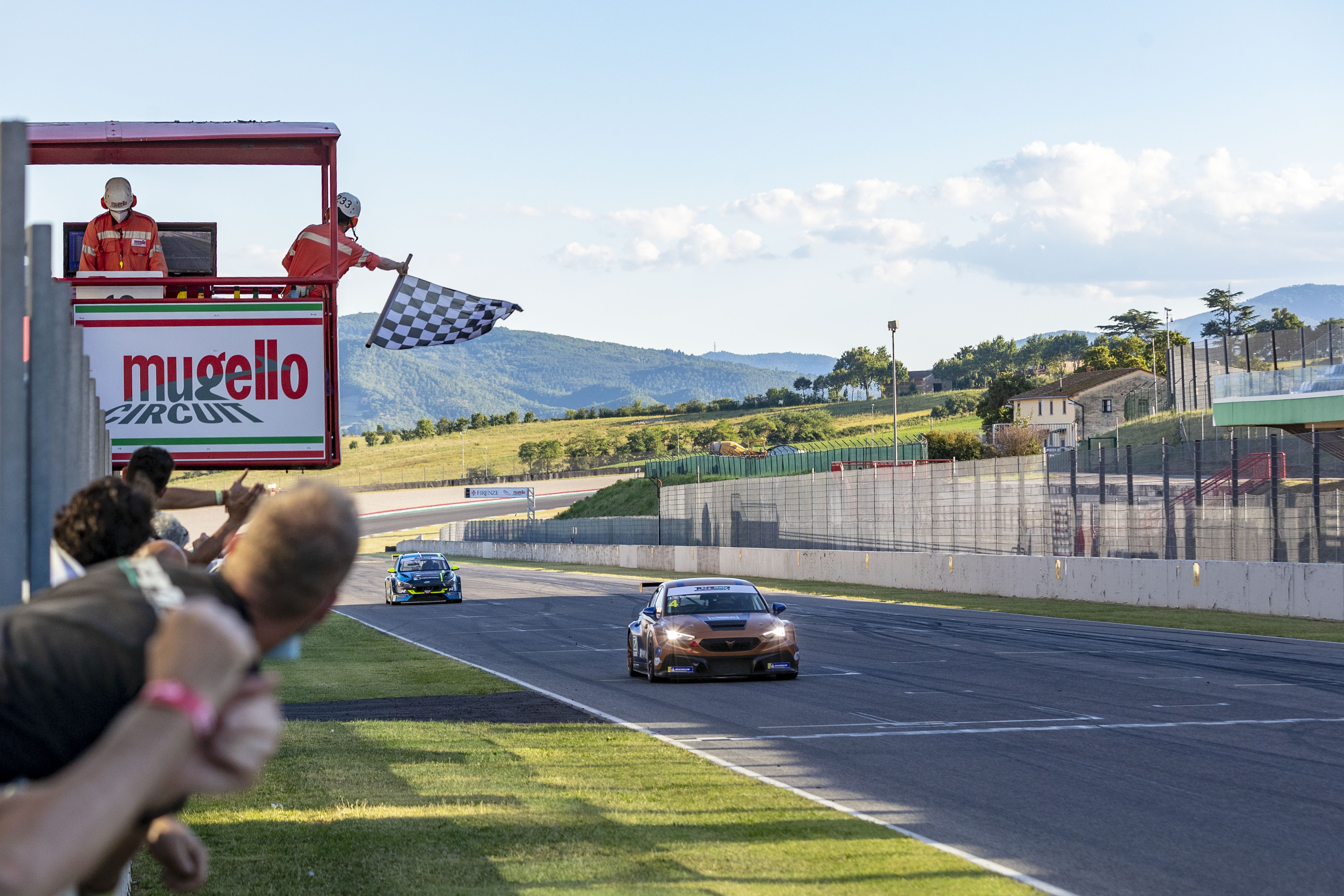
Tavano crossing the finish line in first position during a 2020 TCR Italy Touring Car Championship race at Mugello

In 2019, to the activity of coordinator and driver he added that of Tester Development Manager SEAT Cupra ST Cup Italia, Team Manager for Scuderia del Girasole cars in the Italian TCR DSG Endurance Championship. He was chosen as a coach for the Youtester blog and CONI awarded him the Medal for athletic value CONI Italy. He won the title of TCR Italy Italian Champion with one race in advance.

In 2020, Tavano continued his commitment as instructor coordinator and as tester for the new CUPRA Leon Competicion. For the third consecutive year, he comes first overall.

2021 marked Tavano's fourth participation in the Italian TCR, once again with CUPRA. He came in third overall place, winning three seasonal victories. Tavano once again served as the coordinator of the instructors for safe and sports driving.

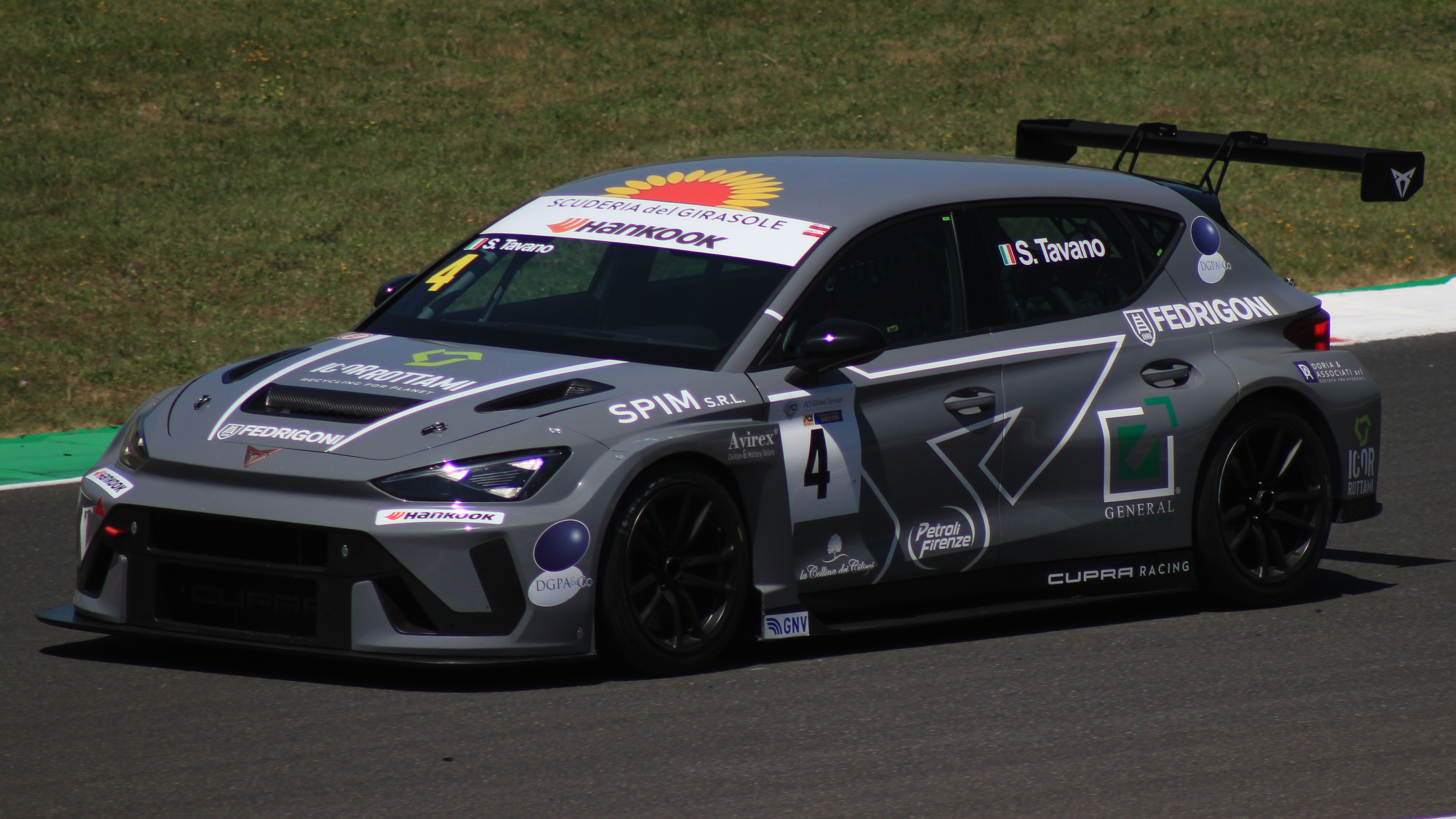
Tavano during the 2024 TCR Italy Touring Car Championship.

== Racing record ==
=== Complete Italian/Euro Formula 3000 results ===
(key) (Races in bold indicate pole position; races in italics indicate fastest lap)

Year	Entrant	1	2	3	4	5	6	7	8	DC	Points
2000	B & C Competition	VLL; 13	MUG; 20	IMO; Ret						-	0
2000	ADM Competizione				MNZ; 14	VLL; 13	DON; 15	PER; 7	MIS	-	0
2001	Sighinolfi Autoracing	VLL; 5	PER; 5	MNZ; 7	DON; 2	ZOL; 1	IMO; DNS	NÜR; Ret	VAL; Ret	4th	20

=== Complete World Touring Car Championship results ===
(key) (Races in bold indicate pole position) (Races in italics indicate fastest lap)

Year	Team	Car	1	2	3	4	5	6	7	8	9	10	11	12	13	14	15	16	17	18	19	20	DC	Points
2005	DB Motorsport	Alfa Romeo 156	ITA; 1; 17	ITA; 2; 16	FRA; 1; 18	FRA; 2; 18	GBR; 1	GBR; 2	SMR; 1; 19	SMR; 2; 20	MEX; 1	MEX; 2	BEL; 1	BEL; 2	GER; 1	GER; 2	TUR; 1	TUR; 2	ESP; 1	ESP; 2	MAC; 1	MAC; 2	NC	0
2006	N. Technology	Alfa Romeo 156	ITA; 1 Ret	ITA; 2 DNS	FRA; 1 NC	FRA; 2; 15	GBR; 1; 21	GBR; 2; 16	GER; 1; 23	GER; 2; 17	BRA; 1; 15	BRA; 2; 9	**MEX**; **1**; 1	MEX; 2 Ret	CZE; 1; 15	CZE; 2; 18	TUR; 1 NC	TUR; 2; 15	ESP; 1; 4	ESP; 2; 10	MAC; 1; 15	MAC; 2 Ret	18th	15
