= Oscar Hidalgo =

Mexican racing driver

Oscar Alberto Hidalgo Forcelledo (born 9 October 1982 in Puebla) is a Mexican auto racing driver. His father, also named Oscar, was a racing driver as well, and competed in the 1989 480km of Mexico, the final round of the 1989 World Sportscar Championship season.

== Career ==
Hidalgo finished third in the 2004 Formula Renault 2000 de America series. He then finished runner-up in 2005. He finished 11th in the 2006 season. He competed at two rounds of the 2007 season. The series was cancelled during the 2008 season.

Hidalgo raced for the Wiechers-Sport team at his local round of the 2006 World Touring Car Championship season, the Race of Mexico. He finished the two races in 24th and 14th place.
