= 2006 World Touring Car Championship =

Motorsport contest

Champions
- World Drivers' Champion: Andy Priaulx
- World Manufacturers' Champion: BMW

Seasons
- ← 2005 2007 →

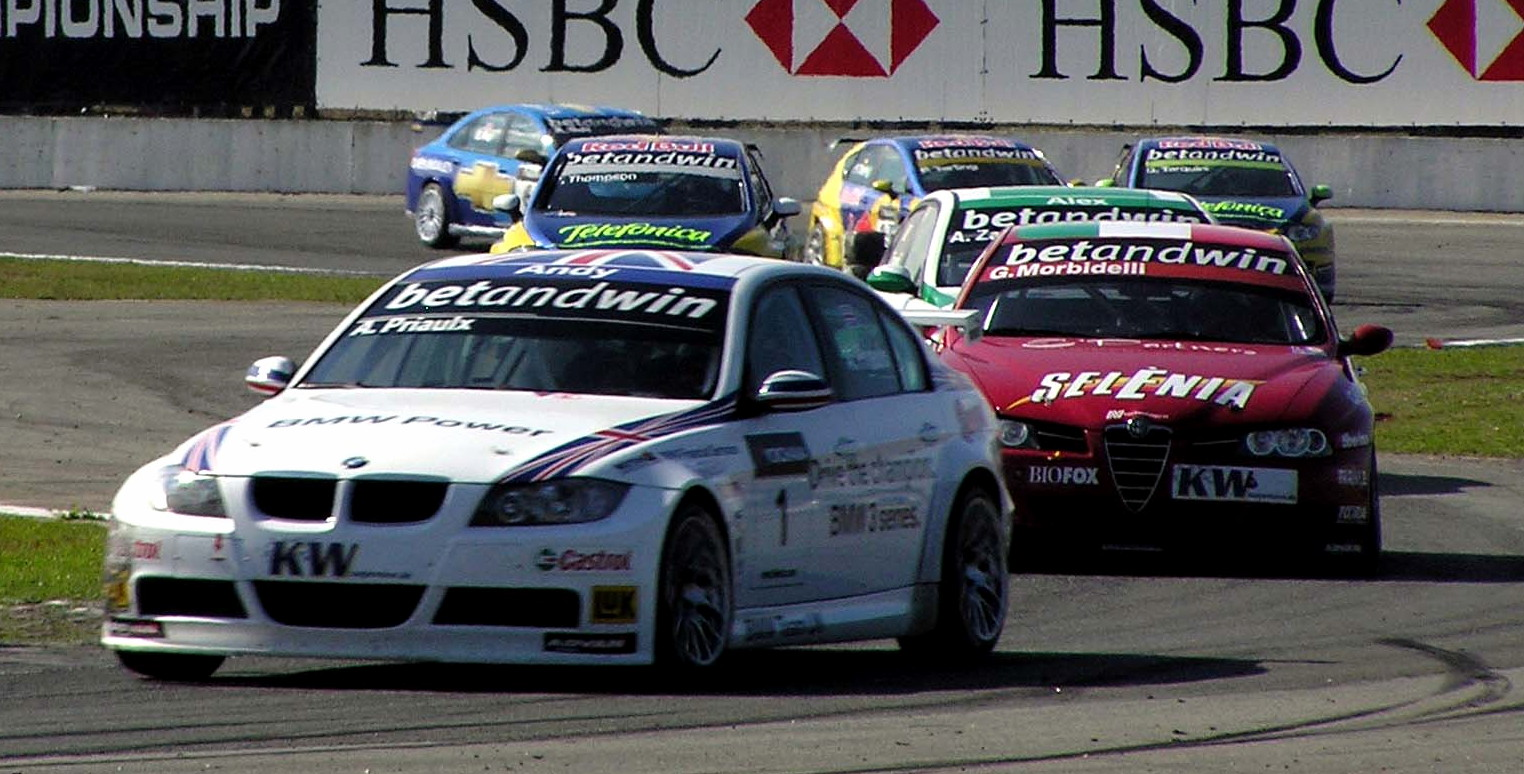
The BMW 320si of Andy Priaulx leads the WTCC field during race 10 at Curitiba

The 2006 World Touring Car Championship season was the third season of FIA World Touring Car Championship motor racing. It featured a ten event, twenty race series which commenced on 2 April 2006 and ended on 19 November. The series was open to Super 2000, Diesel 2000 and Super Production Cars, with two titles awarded, the FIA World Touring Car Champion for Drivers and the FIA World Touring Car Champion for Manufacturers. Andy Priaulx won the Drivers title and BMW won the Manufacturers award.

== Teams and drivers ==
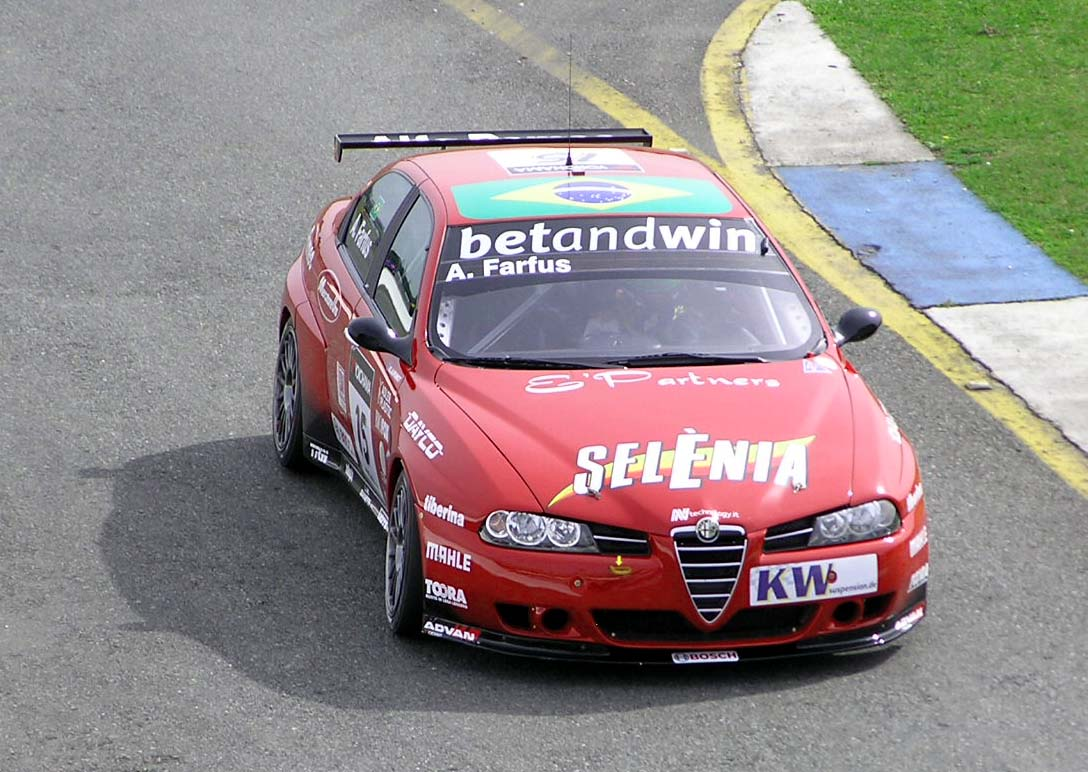
The Alfa Romeo 156 of Augusto Farfus at the Curitiba event

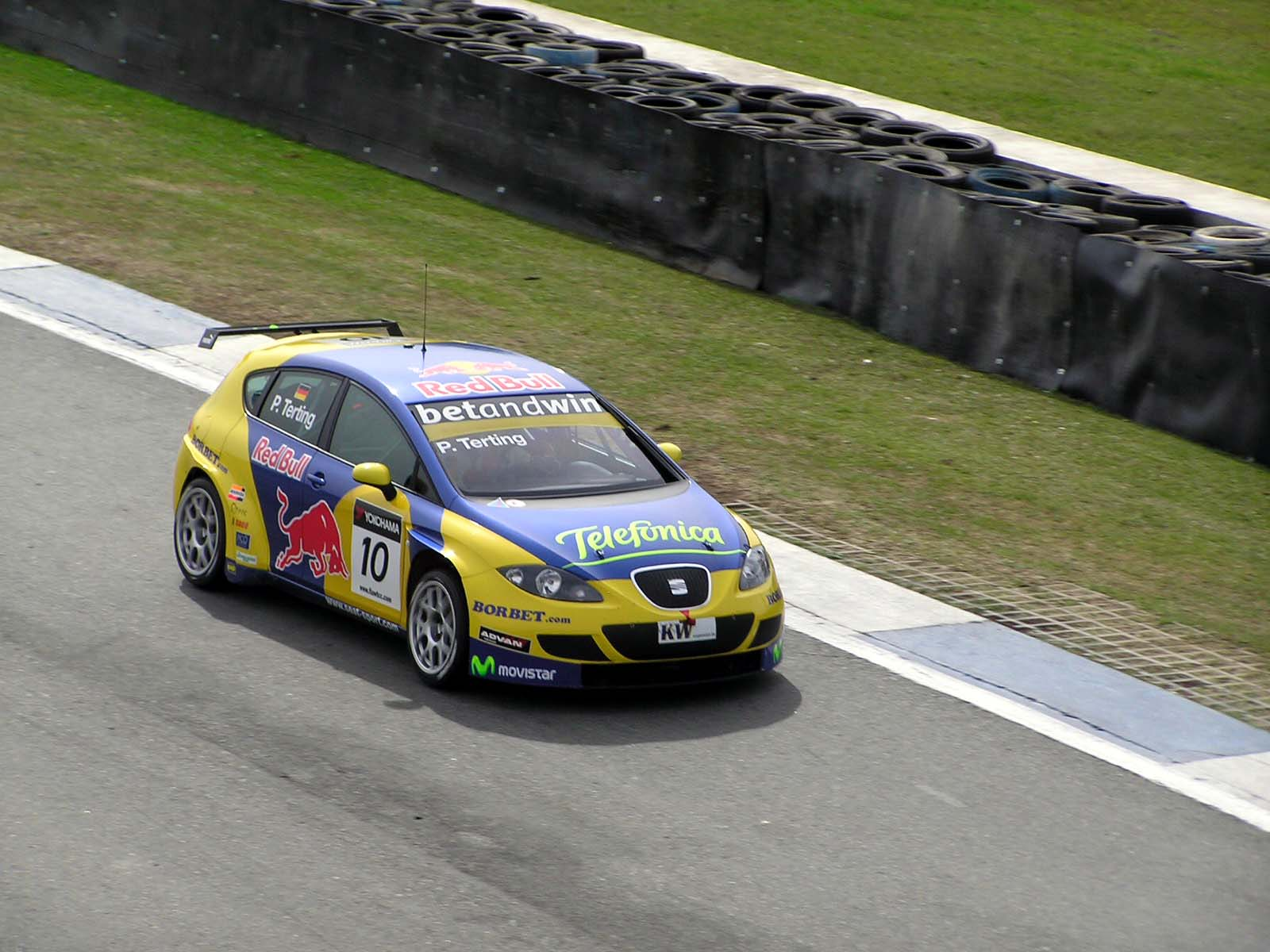
The SEAT Leon of Peter Terting at the Curitiba event

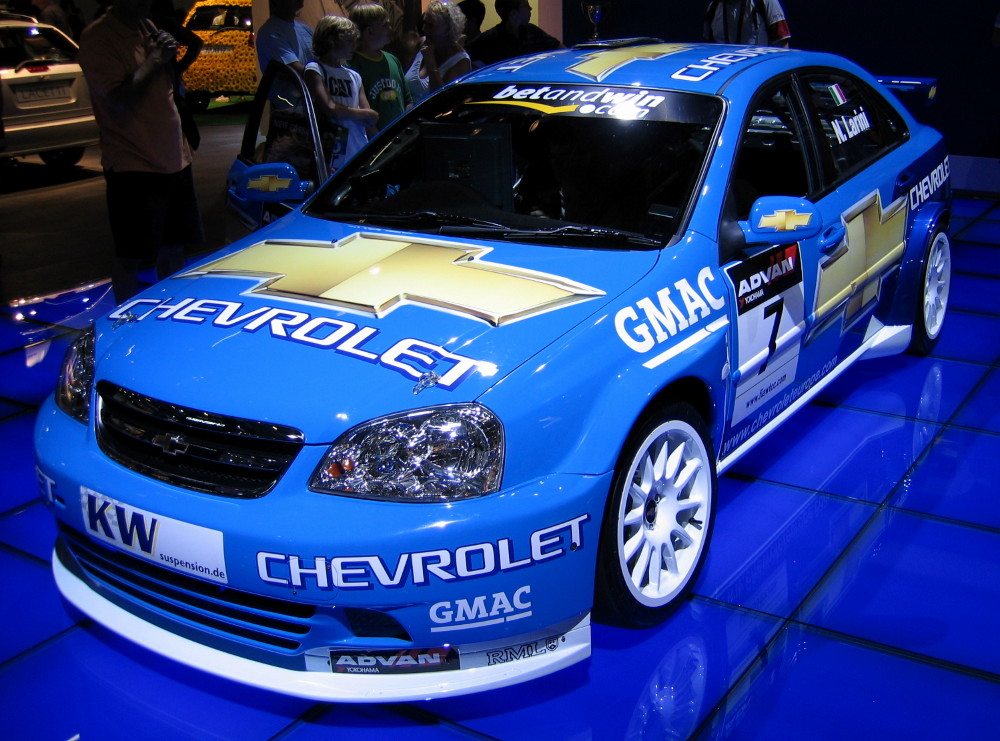
The Chevrolet Lacetti of Nicola Larini

The following drivers and teams contested the 2006 World Touring Car Championship.

Team	Car	No.	Drivers	Events
Manufacturer Teams
(United Kingdom) BMW Team UK	BMW 320si	1	(United Kingdom) Andy Priaulx	All
(United Kingdom) BMW Team UK	BMW 320si	40	(Denmark) Jan Magnussen	10
BMW Team Italy-Spain	BMW 320si	4	(Italy) Alessandro Zanardi	All
BMW Team Italy-Spain	BMW 320si	5	(Spain) Marcel Costa	1–4
BMW Team Italy-Spain	BMW 320si	41	(Netherlands) Duncan Huisman	5–10
(Germany) BMW Team Deutschland	BMW 320si	42	(Germany) Jörg Müller	All
(Germany) BMW Team Deutschland	BMW 320si	43	(Germany) Dirk Müller	All
(Spain) SEAT Sport	SEAT León	2	(Italy) Gabriele Tarquini	All
(Spain) SEAT Sport	SEAT León	3	(Sweden) Rickard Rydell	All
(Spain) SEAT Sport	SEAT León	9	(Spain) Jordi Gené	All
(Spain) SEAT Sport	SEAT León	10	(Germany) Peter Terting	All
(Spain) SEAT Sport	SEAT León	11	(United Kingdom) James Thompson	All
(Spain) SEAT Sport	SEAT León	12	(France) Yvan Muller	All
(Spain) SEAT Sport	SEAT León	14	(Germany) Florian Gruber	4
(Spain) SEAT Sport	SEAT León	21	(Spain) Oscar Nogués	9
(Spain) SEAT Sport	SEAT León	66	(Macau) André Couto	10
(United Kingdom) Chevrolet RML	Chevrolet Lacetti	6	(United Kingdom) Robert Huff	All
(United Kingdom) Chevrolet RML	Chevrolet Lacetti	7	(Italy) Nicola Larini	All
(United Kingdom) Chevrolet RML	Chevrolet Lacetti	8	(Switzerland) Alain Menu	All
(Italy) N.technology	Alfa Romeo 156	15	(Brazil) Augusto Farfus	All
(Italy) N.technology	Alfa Romeo 156	16	(Italy) Gianni Morbidelli	All
(Italy) N.technology	Alfa Romeo 156	18	(Italy) Salvatore Tavano	All
(Italy) JAS Motorsport	Honda Accord Euro R	25	(Italy) Fabrizio Giovanardi	5, 10
Independents' Trophy
(Hong Kong) GR Asia	SEAT Toledo Cupra	19	(Italy) Maurizio Ceresoli	1–6
(Hong Kong) GR Asia	SEAT Toledo Cupra	20	(Netherlands) Tom Coronel	1–2
(Hong Kong) GR Asia	Seat León	19	(Italy) Maurizio Ceresoli	7–10
(Hong Kong) GR Asia	Seat León	20	(Netherlands) Tom Coronel	3–10
(Italy) JAS Motorsport	Honda Accord Euro R	23	(Belgium) Pierre-Yves Corthals	1–4, 6–9
(Italy) JAS Motorsport	Honda Accord Euro R	24	(United Kingdom) Ryan Sharp	1–7
(Italy) Proteam Motorsport	BMW 320si	30	(Italy) Luca Rangoni	All
(Italy) Proteam Motorsport	BMW 320i	31	(Italy) Stefano D'Aste	All
(Germany) Wiechers-Sport	BMW 320i	32	(Mexico) Oscar Alberto Hidalgo	6
(Germany) Wiechers-Sport	BMW 320i	33	(Republic of Ireland) Emmet O'Brien	1–5
(Germany) Wiechers-Sport	BMW 320i	34	(Italy) Diego Romanini	All
(Germany) Wiechers-Sport	BMW 320i	35	(Czech Republic) Jan Vonka	7
(Brazil) Time TekProm	Alfa Romeo 156	36	(Brazil) Lucas Molo	5
(Switzerland) Maurer Motorsport	Chevrolet Lacetti	37	(Germany) Rainer Bastuck	7
(Switzerland) Maurer Motorsport	Chevrolet Lacetti	38	(Belgium) Vincent Radermecker	7, 9
(Switzerland) Maurer Motorsport	Chevrolet Lacetti	48	(Spain) María de Villota	9
(Germany) TFS-Yaco Racing	Toyota Corolla T-Sport	39	(Germany) Philip Geipel	7
(Czech Republic) Československý Motorsport	Alfa Romeo 156 Gta	44	(Czech Republic) Jiří Janák	1
Peugeot Sport Denmark	Peugeot 407	46	(Sweden) Jens Edman	1, 4
(Turkey) Kosifler Motorsport	BMW 320i	47	(Turkey) Ibrahim Okyay	8
(Italy) DB Motorsport	Alfa Romeo 156	51	(Italy) Alessandro Balzan	1–2
(Italy) DB Motorsport	Alfa Romeo 156	52	(Italy) Elio Marchetti	1–2
(Italy) Scuderia La Torre	Alfa Romeo 156 Gta	53	(Italy) Riccardo Romagnoli	1–2
(Italy) GDL Racing	BMW 320i	54	(Italy) Emanuele Naspetti	1–2
(San Marino) Zerocinque Motorsport	BMW 320i	55	(San Marino) Stefano Valli	1–2
(San Marino) Zerocinque Motorsport	BMW 320i	56	(Italy) Simone Iacone	1–2
(Italy) Scuderia del Girasole	Seat León	57	(Italy) Davide Roda	1–2
(Italy) Scuderia del Girasole	Seat León	58	(Italy) Roberto Colciago	2
(Italy) Scuderia del Girasole	Seat Toledo Cupra	58	(Italy) Roberto Colciago	1
(Macau) Ao's Racing Team	BMW 320i	62	(Macau) Ao Chi Hong	10

=== Drivers changes ===
Changed Teams

- Gabriele Tarquini: Alfa Romeo Racing Team → SEAT Sport
- James Thompson: Alfa Romeo Racing Team → SEAT Sport

Entering WTCC including those who entered one-off rounds in 2005

- Yvan Muller: British Touring Car Championship → SEAT Sport
- Marcel Costa: No full-time drive → BMW Team Italy-Spain
- Gianni Morbidelli: FIA GT Championship → N-Technology
- Salvatore Tavano: Italian Superturismo Championship → N-Technology
- Maurizio Ceresoli: Italian Formula Three Championship → GR Asia
- Pierre-Yves Corthals: No full-time drive → Jas Motorsport
- Ryan Sharp: Formula Renault 3.5 Series → Jas Motorsport
- Luca Rangoni: No full-time drive → Proteam Motorsport
- Emmet O'Brien: European Alfa Romeo 147 Challenge → Wiechers-Sport
- Diego Romanini: FIA GT Championship → Wiechers-Sport

Leaving WTCC

- Fabrizio Giovanardi: Alfa Romeo Racing Team → British Touring Car Championship
- Antonio García: BMW Team Italy-Spain → No full-time drive
- Thomas Klenke: Ford Hotfiel Sport → No full-time drive
- Michael Funke: Ford Hotfiel Sport → ADAC GT Masters
- Roberto Colciago: Jas Motorsport → Italian Superturismo Championship
- Adriano de Micheli: Jas Motorsport → No full-time drive
- Giuseppe Cirò: Proteam Motorsport → Ferrari Challenge
- Marc Hennerici: Wiechers-Sport → Veranstaltergemeinschaft Langstreckenpokal Nürburgring

== Calendar ==
Each event comprised two races of 50 kilometres distance. The starting grid for the first race was determined by the results of the qualifying session and the grid for the second race by the provisional results of the first race, with the top eight positions reversed.

Event		Race Name	Track	Date
1	R1	Race of Italy	(Italy) Autodromo Nazionale di Monza	2 April
1	R2	Race of Italy	(Italy) Autodromo Nazionale di Monza	2 April
2	R3	Race of France	(France) Circuit de Nevers Magny-Cours	30 April
2	R4	Race of France	(France) Circuit de Nevers Magny-Cours	30 April
3	R5	Race of UK	(United Kingdom) Brands Hatch	21 May
3	R6	Race of UK	(United Kingdom) Brands Hatch	21 May
4	R7	Race of Germany	(Germany) Motorsport Arena Oschersleben	4 June
4	R8	Race of Germany	(Germany) Motorsport Arena Oschersleben	4 June
5	R9	Race of Brazil	(Brazil) Autódromo Internacional de Curitiba	2 July
5	R10	Race of Brazil	(Brazil) Autódromo Internacional de Curitiba	2 July
6	R11	Race of Mexico	(Mexico) Autódromo Miguel E. Abed	30 July
6	R12	Race of Mexico	(Mexico) Autódromo Miguel E. Abed	30 July
7	R13	Race of the Czech Republic	(Czech Republic) Masaryk Circuit	3 September
7	R14	Race of the Czech Republic	(Czech Republic) Masaryk Circuit	3 September
8	R15	Race of Turkey	(Turkey) Istanbul Park	24 September
8	R16	Race of Turkey	(Turkey) Istanbul Park	24 September
9	R17	Race of Spain	(Spain) Circuit Ricardo Tormo	8 October
9	R18	Race of Spain	(Spain) Circuit Ricardo Tormo	8 October
10	R19	Guia Race of Macau	(Macau) Guia Circuit	19 November
10	R20	Guia Race of Macau	(Macau) Guia Circuit	19 November

== Results and standings ==
=== Races ===
Race	Race Name	Pole Position	Fastest lap	Winning driver	Winning team	Winning independent	Report
1	Race of Italy	(United Kingdom) Andy Priaulx	(Italy) Gabriele Tarquini	(United Kingdom) Andy Priaulx	(United Kingdom) BMW Team UK	(Italy) Alessandro Balzan	Report
2	Race of Italy		(United Kingdom) James Thompson	(Brazil) Augusto Farfus	(Italy) N.Technology	(Italy) Alessandro Balzan	Report
3	Race of France	(Italy) Gabriele Tarquini	(Germany) Dirk Müller	(Germany) Dirk Müller	BMW Team Germany	(Netherlands) Tom Coronel	Report
4	Race of France		(United Kingdom) Andy Priaulx	(United Kingdom) Andy Priaulx	(United Kingdom) BMW Team UK	(Italy) Stefano D'Aste	Report
5	(United Kingdom) Race of UK	(Sweden) Rickard Rydell	(Germany) Peter Terting	(France) Yvan Muller	(Spain) SEAT Sport	(Netherlands) Tom Coronel	Report
6	(United Kingdom) Race of UK		(Switzerland) Alain Menu	(Switzerland) Alain Menu	(United States) Chevrolet	(United Kingdom) Ryan Sharp	Report
7	Race of Germany	(United Kingdom) Andy Priaulx	(Sweden) Rickard Rydell	(United Kingdom) Andy Priaulx	(United Kingdom) BMW Team UK	(Netherlands) Tom Coronel	Report
8	Race of Germany		(Brazil) Augusto Farfus	(Germany) Jörg Müller	BMW Team Germany	(Netherlands) Tom Coronel	Report
9	Race of Brazil	(Brazil) Augusto Farfus	(Spain) Jordi Gené	(Spain) Jordi Gené	(Spain) SEAT Sport	(United Kingdom) Ryan Sharp	Report
10	Race of Brazil		(Italy) Alessandro Zanardi	(United Kingdom) Andy Priaulx	(United Kingdom) BMW Team UK	(Netherlands) Tom Coronel	Report
11	Race of Mexico	(Italy) Salvatore Tavano	(United Kingdom) Ryan Sharp	(Italy) Salvatore Tavano	(Italy) N.Technology	(United Kingdom) Ryan Sharp	Report
12	Race of Mexico		(Brazil) Augusto Farfus	(Brazil) Augusto Farfus	(Italy) N.Technology	(Netherlands) Tom Coronel	Report
13	Race of the Czech Republic	(Italy) Gabriele Tarquini	(France) Yvan Muller	(Germany) Jörg Müller	BMW Team Germany	(Netherlands) Tom Coronel	Report
14	Race of the Czech Republic		(United Kingdom) Robert Huff	(United Kingdom) Robert Huff	(United States) Chevrolet	(Italy) Stefano D'Aste	Report
15	Race of Turkey	(Sweden) Rickard Rydell	(Netherlands) Duncan Huisman	(Italy) Alessandro Zanardi	BMW Team Italy/Spain	(Netherlands) Tom Coronel	Report
16	Race of Turkey		(Italy) Gabriele Tarquini	(Italy) Gabriele Tarquini	(Spain) SEAT Sport	(Italy) Stefano D'Aste	Report
17	Race of Spain	(Brazil) Augusto Farfus	(Spain) Jordi Gené	(Brazil) Augusto Farfus	(Italy) N.Technology	(Italy) Luca Rangoni	Report
18	Race of Spain		(Germany) Jörg Müller	(Germany) Jörg Müller	BMW Team Germany	(Italy) Luca Rangoni	Report
19	Guia Race of Macau	(United Kingdom) Andy Priaulx	(Switzerland) Alain Menu	(United Kingdom) Andy Priaulx	(United Kingdom) BMW Team UK	(Netherlands) Tom Coronel	Report
20	Guia Race of Macau		(France) Yvan Muller	(Germany) Jörg Müller	BMW Team Germany	(Netherlands) Tom Coronel	Report

== Championship standings ==
Points system
**1st**	**2nd**	**3rd**	**4th**	**5th**	**6th**	**7th**	**8th**
10	8	6	5	4	3	2	1

=== Drivers' Championship ===
Pos	Driver	ITA (Italy)		FRA (France)		UK (United Kingdom)		GER (Germany)		BRA (Brazil)		MEX (Mexico)		CZE (Czech Republic)		TUR (Turkey)		ESP (Spain)		MAC (Macau)		Pts
1	(United Kingdom) Andy Priaulx	**1**	Ret	8	**1**	8	**8**	**1**	10	8	**1**	18	7	5	2	14	Ret	Ret	8	**1**	5	73
2	(Germany) Jörg Müller	28	25†	2	2	Ret	Ret	7	1	9	7	19	15	1	4	Ret	8	6	1	6	1	72
3	(Brazil) Augusto Farfus	8	**1**	21	12	22	11	6	2	**3**	Ret	2	1	Ret	15	9	20†	**1**	5	5	Ret	64
4	(France) Yvan Muller	2	2	13	7	1	5	11	8	13	13	14	Ret	3	3	13	Ret	10	6	3	2	62
5	(Italy) Gabriele Tarquini	5	6	**4**	5	6	4	4	7	4	5	10	8	**Ret**	10	3	1	24†	DNS	11	Ret	57
6	(Germany) Dirk Müller	4	Ret	1	DNS	9	6	2	3	20	15	6	4	9	5	4	7	11	7	14	8	54
7	(Sweden) Rickard Rydell	6	22†	3	Ret	**5**	2	3	5	6	Ret	8	**3**	Ret	DNS	**2**	4	23†	20	16	14†	54
8	(United Kingdom) James Thompson	3	9	7	4	3	3	5	6	5	4	5	5	14	24†	17	13	9	12	10	4	54
9	(Germany) Peter Terting	13	8	6	6	2	18	8	**4**	2	6	9	Ret	10	8	6	2	5	21	8	**Ret**	49
10	(Spain) Jordi Gené	12	5	5	3	18	10	16	14	1	14	11	9	4	6	Ret	5	16	Ret	12	Ret	36
11	(Italy) Alessandro Zanardi	7	23†	14	Ret	10	9	24	13	10	3	17	Ret	2	22†	1	9	15	17	23	9	26
12	(Italy) Nicola Larini	27	7	11	8	NC	12	14	21	Ret	DNS	15	Ret	11	7	7	3	3	4	22†	DNS	24
13	(Netherlands) Duncan Huisman									11	16	21	11	18	9	5	10	7	2	2	13	22
14	(Italy) Gianni Morbidelli	29†	10	20	14	12	7	9	11	7	2	7	2	17	14	10	16	13	11	Ret	DNS	22
15	(Switzerland) Alain Menu	10	3	19	13	7	1	13	Ret	19†	10	12	Ret	7	Ret	20†	Ret	8	**9**	21†	10	21
16	(United Kingdom) Robert Huff	19	12	9	9	4	Ret	12	9	18	8	Ret	DNS	8	**1**	15	6	Ret	15	9	Ret	20
17	(Netherlands) Tom Coronel	Ret	13	10	16	13	14	10	12	14	11	4	6	6	23†	8	**12**	14	13	7	3	20
18	(Italy) Salvatore Tavano	Ret	DNS	NC	15	21	16	23	17	15	9	**1**	Ret	15	18	NC	15	4	10	15	Ret	15
19	(Italy) Luca Rangoni	15	Ret	12	21	20	15	17	23	17	Ret	23	12	Ret	12	21†	21†	2	3	20	12	14
20	(Italy) Fabrizio Giovanardi									16	DNS									4	6	8
21	(United Kingdom) Ryan Sharp	18	14	22	Ret	16	13	25	18	12	12	3	Ret	12	17							6
22	(Italy) Alessandro Balzan	9	4	Ret	17																	5
23	(Macau) André Couto																			13	7	2
NC	(Italy) Stefano D'Aste	14	21	18	10	19	Ret	19	19	Ret	Ret	22	Ret	13	11	12	11	20	19	Ret	11	0
NC	(Belgium) Pierre-Yves Corthals	22	DNS	16	Ret	17	Ret	Ret	DNS			13	10	16	16	11	19	12	16			0
NC	(Spain) Marcel Costa	11	Ret	Ret	Ret	11	Ret	18	16													0
NC	(Italy) Roberto Colciago	Ret	DNS	15	11																	0
NC	(Italy) Simone Iacone	16	11	25	DNS																	0
NC	(Belgium) Vincent Radermecker													19	13			18	14			0
NC	(Italy) Diego Romanini	20	24†	27	22	15	Ret	22	25†	22	17	20	13	23	19	18	18	22	23	18	15	0
NC	(Italy) Maurizio Ceresoli	25	19	NC	19	14	19	21	22	Ret	DNS	16	16†	20	NC	16	17	17	18	17	Ret	0
NC	(Turkey) Ibrahim Okyay															19	14					0
NC	(Mexico) Oscar Hidalgo											24	14									0
NC	(Germany) Florian Gruber							15	15													0
NC	(Republic of Ireland) Emmet O'Brien	26†	15	23	23	Ret	17	Ret	24	21	Ret											0
NC	(Italy) Riccardo Romagnoli	17	16	26	18																	0
NC	(San Marino) Stefano Valli	24	17	Ret	DNS																	0
NC	(Italy) Emanuele Naspetti	30†	DNS	17	Ret																	0
NC	(Czech Republic) Jiří Janák	21	18																			0
NC	(Brazil) Lucas Molo									Ret	18†											0
NC	(Spain) Oscar Nogués																	19	22			0
NC	(Macau) Ao Chi Hong																			19	Ret	0
NC	(Italy) Davide Roda	23	20	28	20																	0
NC	(Sweden) Jens Edman	Ret	DNS					20	20													0
NC	(Germany) Rainer Bastuck													22	20							0
NC	(Germany) Phillip Geipel													21	Ret							0
NC	(Spain) María de Villota																	21	Ret			0
NC	(Czech Republic) Jan Vonka													Ret	21							0
NC	(Italy) Elio Marchetti	Ret	DNS	24	Ret																	0
NC	(Denmark) Jan Magnussen																			Ret	Ret	0
Pos	Driver	ITA (Italy)		FRA (France)		UK (United Kingdom)		GER (Germany)		BRA (Brazil)		MEX (Mexico)		CZE (Czech Republic)		TUR (Turkey)		ESP (Spain)		MAC (Macau)		Pts

Colour	Result
Gold	Winner
Silver	Second place
Bronze	Third place
Green	Points classification
Blue	Non-points classification
Blue	Non-classified finish (NC)
Purple	Retired, not classified (Ret)
Red	Did not qualify (DNQ)
Red	Did not pre-qualify (DNPQ)
Black	Disqualified (DSQ)
White	Did not start (DNS)
White	Withdrew (WD)
White	Race cancelled (C)
Blank	Did not practice (DNP)
Blank	Did not arrive (DNA)
Blank	Excluded (EX)

**Bold** – Pole
Italics – Fastest Lap

† — Drivers did not finish the race, but were classified as they completed over 90% of the race distance.

=== Manufacturers' Championship ===
Championship points were awarded on a 10–8–6–5–4–3–2–1 basis for the first eight positions in each race. However, only the two best placed cars per manufacturer were eligible to score points and all other cars from that manufacturer were considered invisible as far as point scoring was concerned.

Pos	Manufacturer	ITA (Italy)		FRA (France)		UK (United Kingdom)		GER (Germany)		BRA (Brazil)		MEX (Mexico)		CZE (Czech Republic)		TUR (Turkey)		ESP (Spain)		MAC (Macau)		Pts
1	(Germany) BMW	1	15	1	1	8	6	1	1	8	1	6	4	1	2	1	7	2	1	1	1	254
1	(Germany) BMW	4	17	2	2	9	8	2	3	9	3	17	7	2	4	4	8	6	2	2	5	254
2	(Spain) SEAT	2	2	3	3	1	2	3	4	1	4	4	3	3	3	2	1	5	6	3	2	235
2	(Spain) SEAT	3	5	4	4	2	3	4	5	2	5	5	5	4	6	3	2	9	12	7	3	235
3	(Italy) Alfa Romeo	8	1	20	12	12	7	6	2	3	2	1	1	15	14	9	15	1	5	5	Ret	154
3	(Italy) Alfa Romeo	9	4	21	14	21	11	9	11	7	9	2	2	17	15	10	16	4	10	15	Ret	154
4	(United States) Chevrolet	10	3	9	8	4	1	12	9	18	8	12	Ret	7	1	7	3	3	4	9	10	128
4	(United States) Chevrolet	19	7	11	9	7	12	13	21	19†	10	15	Ret	8	7	15	6	8	9	21†	Ret	128
Pos	Manufacturer	ITA (Italy)		FRA (France)		UK (United Kingdom)		GER (Germany)		BRA (Brazil)		MEX (Mexico)		CZE (Czech Republic)		TUR (Turkey)		ESP (Spain)		MAC (Macau)		Pts

=== Yokohama Independents' Trophy ===
Points were awarded on a 10–8–6–5–4–3–2–1 basis for the first eight finishers of those entries which were classified as Independents.

Pos	Driver	ITA (Italy)		FRA (France)		UK (United Kingdom)		GER (Germany)		BRA (Brazil)		MEX (Mexico)		CZE (Czech Republic)		TUR (Turkey)		ESP (Spain)		MAC (Macau)		Pts
1	(Netherlands) Tom Coronel	Ret	13	**10**	**16**	**13**	**14**	**10**	**12**	**14**	11	4	**6**	**6**	**23**†	8	**12**	**14**	13	**7**	**3**	178
2	(Italy) Luca Rangoni	15	Ret	12	21	20	15	17	23	17	Ret	23	12	Ret	12	**21**†	21†	2	**3**	20	12	100
3	(Italy) Stefano D'Aste	14	21	18	10	19	Ret	19	19	Ret	Ret	22	Ret	13	11	12	11	20	19	Ret	11	93
4	(United Kingdom) Ryan Sharp	18	14	22	Ret	16	13	25	18	12	**12**	**3**	Ret	12	17							75
5	(Italy) Maurizio Ceresoli	25	19	NC	19	14	19	21	22	Ret	DNS	16	16†	20	NC	16	17	17	18	17	Ret	69
6	(Italy) Diego Romanini	20	24†	27	22	15	Ret	22	25†	22	17	20	13	23	19	18	18	22	23	18	15	67
7	(Belgium) Pierre-Yves Corthals	22	DNS	16	Ret	17	Ret	Ret	DNS			13	10	16	16	11	19	12	16			57
8	(Italy) Alessandro Balzan	9	**4**	Ret	17																	25
9	(Belgium) Vincent Radermecker													19	13			18	14			20
10	(Republic of Ireland) Emmet O'Brien	26†	15	23	23	Ret	17	Ret	24	21	Ret											17
11	(Italy) Roberto Colciago	Ret	DNS	15	11																	14
12	(Italy) Simone Iacone	16	11	25	DNS																	13
13	(Italy) Riccardo Romagnoli	17	16	26	18																	11
14	(Sweden) Jens Edman	Ret	DNS					20	20													10
15	(Macau) Ao Chi Hong																			19	Ret	10
16	(Turkey) Ibrahim Okyay															19	14					9
17	(Brazil) Lucas Molo									Ret	18†											5
18	(Mexico) Oscar Hidalgo											24	14									5
19	(Italy) Emanuele Naspetti	**30**†	DNS	17	Ret																	4
20	(Germany) Rainer Bastuck													22	20							3
21	(Spain) María de Villota																	21	Ret			2
22	(Germany) Phillip Geipel													21	Ret							2
23	(Italy) Davide Roda	23	20	28	20																	2
24	(San Marino) Stefano Valli	24	17	Ret	DNS																	2
25	(Czech Republic) Jiří Janák	21	18																			2
26	(Czech Republic) Jan Vonka													Ret	21							1
NC	(Italy) Elio Marchetti	Ret	DNS	24	Ret																	0
Pos	Driver	ITA (Italy)		FRA (France)		UK (United Kingdom)		GER (Germany)		BRA (Brazil)		MEX (Mexico)		CZE (Czech Republic)		TUR (Turkey)		ESP (Spain)		MAC (Macau)		Pts

Dead-heat

- 10p: 14th Edman (4th x 2), 15th A. Chi Hong (4th x 1)
- 5p: 17th L. Molo (4th x 1), 18th O. Hidalgo (5th x 1)
- 2p: 21st M. De Villota (7th x 1), 22nd P. Geipel (7th x 1), 23rd D. Roda (7th x 1), 24th S. Valli (8th x 2)

=== Yokohama Teams' Trophy ===
Points were awarded on a 10–8–6–5–4–3–2–1 basis for the first eight finishers of those entries which were classified as Independents.

Pos	Team	ITA (Italy)		FRA (France)		UK (United Kingdom)		GER (Germany)		BRA (Brazil)		MEX (Mexico)		CZE (Czech Republic)		TUR (Turkey)		ESP (Spain)		MAC (Macau)		Pts
1	(Hong Kong) GR Asia	25	13	10	16	13	14	10	12	14	11	4	6	6	23†	8	12	14	13	7	3	247
1	(Hong Kong) GR Asia	Ret	19	NC	19	14	19	21	22	Ret	DNS	16	16†	20	NC	16	17	17	18	17	Ret	247
2	(Italy) Proteam Motorsport	14	21	12	10	19	15	17	19	17	Ret	23	12	13	11	12	11	2	3	20	11	193
2	(Italy) Proteam Motorsport	15	Ret	18	21	20	Ret	19	23	Ret	Ret	24	Ret	Ret	12	21†	21†	20	19	Ret	12	193
3	(Italy) JAS Motorsport	18	14	16	Ret	16	13	25	18	12	12	3	10	12	16	11	19	12	16			132
3	(Italy) JAS Motorsport	22	DNS	22	Ret	17	Ret	Ret	DNS			13	Ret	16	17							132
4	(Germany) Wiechers-Sport	20	15	23	22	15	17	22	24	21	17	20	13	23	19	18	18	22	23	18	15	90
4	(Germany) Wiechers-Sport	26†	24†	27	23	Ret	Ret	Ret	25	22	Ret	24	14	Ret	21							90
5	(Italy) DB Motorsport	9	4	24	17																	25
5	(Italy) DB Motorsport	Ret	DNS	Ret	Ret																	25
6	(Switzerland) Maurer Motorsport													19	13			18	14			25
6	(Switzerland) Maurer Motorsport													22	20			21	Ret			25
7	(Italy) Scuderia del Girasole	23	20	15	11																	16
7	(Italy) Scuderia del Girasole	Ret	DNS	28	20																	16
8	(San Marino) Zerocinque Motorsport	16	11	25	DNS																	15
8	(San Marino) Zerocinque Motorsport	24	17	Ret	DNS																	15
9	(Italy) Scuderia la Torre	17	16	26	18																	11
10	Peugeot Sport Denmark	Ret	DNS					20	20													10
11	(Macau) Ao's Racing Team																			19	Ret	10
12	(Turkey) Kosifler Motorsport															19	14					9
13	(Brazil) Equipe TekProm									Ret	18†											5
14	(Italy) GDL Racing	30†	DNS	17	Ret																	4
15	(Germany) TFS-Yaco Racing													21	Ret							2
16	(Czech Republic) Československý Motorsport	21	18																			2
Pos	Team	ITA (Italy)		FRA (France)		UK (United Kingdom)		GER (Germany)		BRA (Brazil)		MEX (Mexico)		CZE (Czech Republic)		TUR (Turkey)		ESP (Spain)		MAC (Macau)		Pts
