= Florian Gruber =

German racing driver

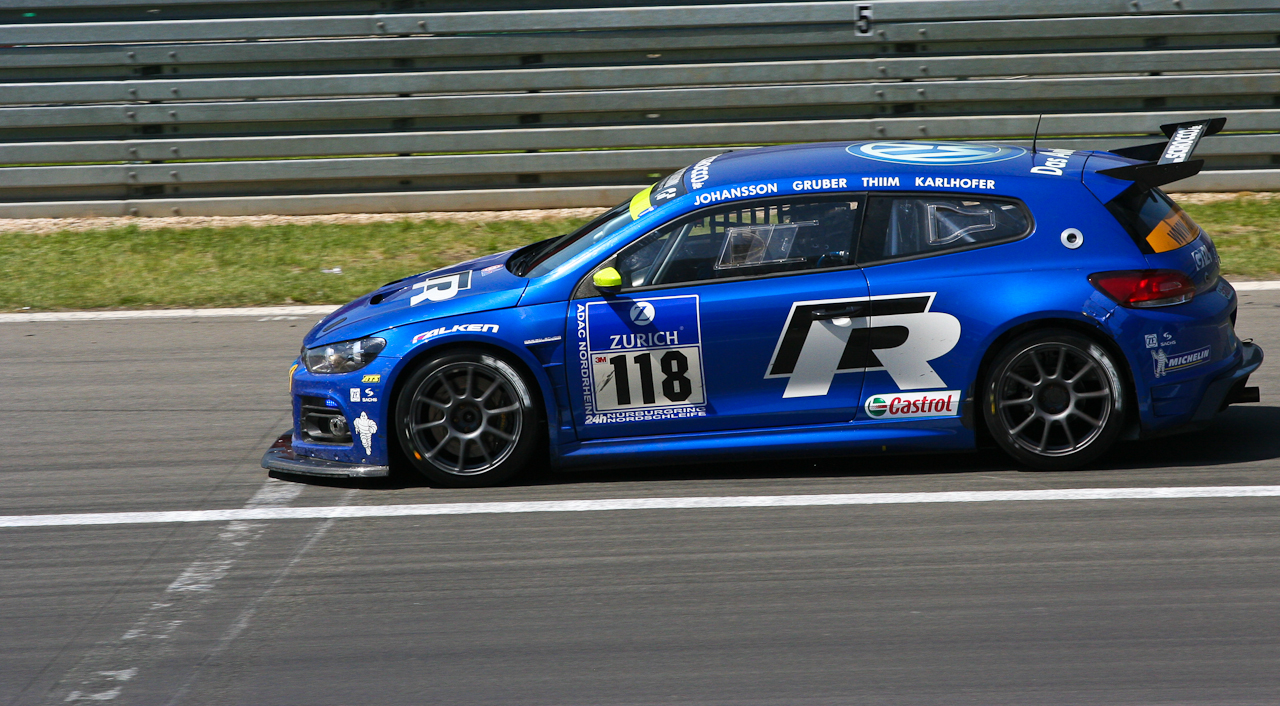
Volkswagen Scirocco of Volkswagen Motorsport Jimmy Johansson (S)/Nicki Thiim (DK)/Florian Gruber (D)/Martin Karlhofer

Florian Gruber (born 26 January 1983 in Vilsbiburg, Lower Bavaria) is a German auto racing driver.

== Career ==
Gruber won Division 2 of the German Touring Car Challenge in 2003, in a Volkswagen Lupo. He moved to the German SEAT Leon Supercopa for 2004, finishing in eighth place. He improved to fourth in 2005, before winning the series in 2006.

Gruber was rewarded for his efforts with a one-off appearance for SEAT Sport during the 2006 World Touring Car Championship season at his home event. He finished in 15th place in both races.

Gruber moved on to the Porsche Carrera Cup Germany in 2007. In 2009, Gruber competed in the FIA GT3 European Championship and ADAC GT Masters.
