= Lucas Molo =

Brazilian racing driver (born 1983)

Lucas Molo (born June 8, 1983 in Rio de Janeiro) is a Brazilian racing driver.

== Career ==
Molo won the Brazilian Endurance Championship in 2004 and 2005 for Equipe TekProm. He finished seventh in the 2006 Mil Milhas Brasil for TekProm, before making a World Touring Car Championship appearance for the team at the Race of Brazil for the team in an Alfa Romeo 156.

In 2007, Molo began competing in the Light class of Stock Car Brasil. Alongside his stock car campaign in 2008, he competed in one race of the Italian Renault Clio Cup. At the start of 2009, he made a one-off appearance for LG Motorsports in the 2009 12 Hours of Sebring, the opening round of the American Le Mans Series.
