= Elio Marchetti =

Italian auto racing driver from Viterbo (born 1974)

Elio Marchetti (born 17 August 1974) is an Italian auto racing driver from Viterbo.

== Career ==
Marchetti competed in the 2006 FIA World Touring Car Championship rounds at Monza and Magny-Cours for DB Motorsport in an Alfa Romeo 156. He also competed in the Italian Touring Car Championship for the same team.

From 1988 to 1992, Marchetti was a Motocross and Supercross rider, a hobby he still enjoys.

=== Complete WTCC results ===
(key) (Races in bold indicate pole position) (Races in italics indicate fastest lap)

Year	Team	Car	1		2		3	4	5	6	7	8	9	10	Position	Points
2006	DB Motorsport	Alfa Romeo 156	MON (Italy)		MGN (France)		BRA (United Kingdom)	OSC (Germany)	CUR (Brazil)	PUE (Mexico)	BRN (Czech Republic)	IST (Turkey)	VAL (Spain)	MAC (Macau)	NC	0
2006	DB Motorsport	Alfa Romeo 156	Ret	DNS	24	Ret									NC	0
