= FIA WTCC Race of Mexico =

Race of Mexico
- Autódromo Miguel E. Abed (2005–2006, 2008–2009)

Race information
- Number of times held: 4
- First held: 2005
- Last held: 2009
- Most wins (drivers): 8 drivers with 1 win each
- Most wins (constructors): (Spain) SEAT (5)

Last race (2009)
- Race 1 Winner: (Sweden) Rickard Rydell; (SEAT Sport)
- Race 2 Winner: (France) Yvan Muller; (SEAT Sport)

The FIA WTCC Race of Mexico was a round of the World Touring Car Championship, held at the Autódromo Miguel E. Abed near the city of Puebla in Mexico.

The race was first run in the 2005 season, the first season of the revived series. It was run every year between 2005 and 2009 except in the 2007 season, when the planned event was cancelled due to problems with the Puebla circuit, although these problems were addressed for 2008. The event was run in June in 2005, in July in 2006, in April in 2008 and in March in 2009. The 2010 running was cancelled due to security fears in the region.

== Winners ==
Year	Race	Driver	Manufacturer	Location	Report
2009	Race 1	(Sweden) Rickard Rydell	SEAT	Puebla	Report
2009	Race 2	(France) Yvan Muller	SEAT	Puebla	Report
2008	Race 1	(Spain) Jordi Gené	SEAT	Puebla	Report
2008	Race 2	(Portugal) Tiago Monteiro	SEAT	Puebla	Report
2006	Race 1	(Italy) Salvatore Tavano	Alfa Romeo	Puebla	Report
2006	Race 2	(Brazil) Augusto Farfus	Alfa Romeo	Puebla	Report
2005	Race 1	(Italy) Fabrizio Giovanardi	Alfa Romeo	Puebla	Report
2005	Race 2	(Germany) Peter Terting	SEAT	Puebla	Report
