= FIA WTCR Race of the Czech Republic =

- Autodrom Most (2021)

Race information
- Number of times held: 7
- First held: 2006
- Last held: 2021
- Most wins (drivers): (United Kingdom) Rob Huff (3)
- Most wins (constructors): (Germany) BMW (7)

Last race (2021)
- Race 1 Winner: (Argentina) Néstor Girolami; (ALL-INKL.COM Münnich Motorsport)
- Race 2 Winner: (Hungary) Norbert Michelisz; (BRC Hyundai N Lukoil Squadra Corse)

The FIA WTCR Race of the Czech Republic is a round of the World Touring Car Cup, which is held at the Autodrom Most in the Czech Republic.

The race took place between 2006 season and 2011 season at the Masaryk Circuit in Brno. After an absence of 10 years, the championship returned to the Czech Republic in 2021 in Most.

== Winners ==
Masaryk Circuit, which held races in 2006–2011

Year	Race	Driver	Manufacturer	Location	Report
2021	Race 1	(Argentina) Néstor Girolami	Honda	Most	Report
2021	Race 2	(Hungary) Norbert Michelisz	Hyundai	Most	Report
2011	Race 1	(United Kingdom) Rob Huff	Chevrolet	Brno	Report
2011	Race 2	(France) Yvan Muller	Chevrolet	Brno	Report
2010	Race 1	(United Kingdom) Rob Huff	Chevrolet	Brno	Report
2010	Race 2	(United Kingdom) Andy Priaulx	BMW	Brno	Report
2009	Race 1	(Italy) Alessandro Zanardi	BMW	Brno	Report
2009	Race 2	(Spain) Sergio Hernández	BMW	Brno	Report
2008	Race 1	(Italy) Alessandro Zanardi	BMW	Brno	Report
2008	Race 2	(Italy) Gabriele Tarquini	SEAT	Brno	Report
2007	Race 1	(Spain) Félix Porteiro	BMW	Brno	Report
2007	Race 2	(Germany) Jörg Müller	BMW	Brno	Report
2006	Race 1	(Germany) Jörg Müller	BMW	Brno	Report
2006	Race 2	(United Kingdom) Rob Huff	Chevrolet	Brno	Report
