= FIA WTCC Race of Turkey =

Touring car race track in Turkey

Race of Turkey
- Istanbul Park (2005–2006)

Race information
- Number of times held: 2
- First held: 2005
- Last held: 2006
- Most wins (drivers): (Italy) Gabriele Tarquini (2)
- Most wins (constructors): (Italy) Alfa Romeo (2)

Last race (2006)
- Race 1 Winner: (Italy) Alessandro Zanardi; (BMW Team Italy-Spain)
- Race 2 Winner: (Italy) Gabriele Tarquini; (SEAT Sport)

The FIA WTCC Race of Turkey was a round of the World Touring Car Championship, which was held at the Istanbul Park circuit near Istanbul in Turkey.

The race was run in the first season of the WTCC after its return in 2005. It remained on the calendar for 2006, but was dropped in 2007 in favour of the Race of Sweden. The race was won by three different Italian drivers during its two years.

== Winners ==
Year	Race	Driver	Manufacturer	Location	Report
2006	Race 1	(Italy) Alessandro Zanardi	BMW	Istanbul Park	Report
2006	Race 2	(Italy) Gabriele Tarquini	SEAT	Istanbul Park	Report
2005	Race 1	(Italy) Fabrizio Giovanardi	Alfa Romeo	Istanbul Park	Report
2005	Race 2	(Italy) Gabriele Tarquini	Alfa Romeo	Istanbul Park	Report
