= FIA WTCC Race of UK =

- Donington Park (2011)

Race information
- Number of times held: 7
- First held: 2005
- Last held: 2011
- Most wins (drivers): (Switzerland) Alain Menu (4) (France) Yvan Muller (4)
- Most wins (constructors): (United States) Chevrolet (7)

Last race (2011)
- Race 1 Winner: (France) Yvan Muller; (Chevrolet)
- Race 2 Winner: (France) Yvan Muller; (Chevrolet)

The FIA WTCC Race of UK event was a round of the World Touring Car Championship that took place in the United Kingdom. It was last held at Donington Park near Castle Donington in Leicestershire.

The race had previously been held at Donington Park from 2002, when the series was known as the European Touring Car Championship but with promotion to world championship status, the event switched to Silverstone in Northamptonshire for 2005. The race was moved to Brands Hatch in Kent for 2006, where it used the full Grand Prix layout. In 2011, the race moved back to Donington Park. The race was left out of the 2012 schedule. In 2012, World Touring Car Championship promoter Marcello Lotti said the Race of UK was unlikely to return to the calendar in 2013 as the series looked to expand to events outside Europe.

During the running of the event, Andy Priaulx was the only British driver to win his home event. He won twice at Brands Hatch, firstly in race two of the 2007 event and then in race two at the 2010 meeting.

== Winners ==
Brands Hatch, which held races in 2006–2010

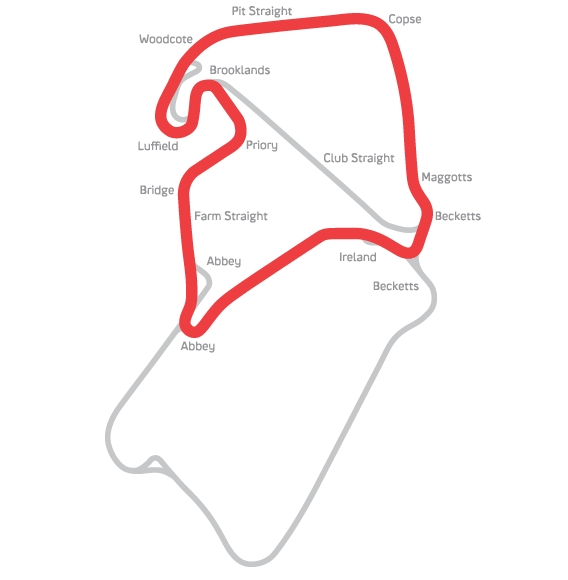
Silverstone Circuit, which held race in 2005

Year	Race	Driver	Manufacturer	Location	Report
2011	Race 1	(France) Yvan Muller	(United States) Chevrolet	Donington Park	Report
2011	Race 2	(France) Yvan Muller	(United States) Chevrolet	Donington Park	Report
2010	Race 1	(France) Yvan Muller	(United States) Chevrolet	Brands Hatch	Report
2010	Race 2	(United Kingdom) Andy Priaulx	(Germany) BMW	Brands Hatch	Report
2009	Race 1	(Switzerland) Alain Menu	(United States) Chevrolet	Brands Hatch	Report
2009	Race 2	(Brazil) Augusto Farfus	(Germany) BMW	Brands Hatch	Report
2008	Race 1	(Germany) Jörg Müller	(Germany) BMW	Brands Hatch	Report
2008	Race 2	(Switzerland) Alain Menu	(United States) Chevrolet	Brands Hatch	Report
2007	Race 1	(Switzerland) Alain Menu	(United States) Chevrolet	Brands Hatch	Report
2007	Race 2	(United Kingdom) Andy Priaulx	(Germany) BMW	Brands Hatch	Report
2006	Race 1	(France) Yvan Muller	(Spain) SEAT	Brands Hatch	Report
2006	Race 2	(Switzerland) Alain Menu	(United States) Chevrolet	Brands Hatch	Report
2005	Race 1	(Italy) Gabriele Tarquini	(Italy) Alfa Romeo	Silverstone	Report
2005	Race 2	(Sweden) Rickard Rydell	(Spain) SEAT	Silverstone	Report
