= FIA WTCC Race of Brazil =

- Autódromo Internacional de Curitiba (2006–2012)

Race information
- Number of times held: 7
- First held: 2006
- Last held: 2012
- Most wins (drivers): (France) Yvan Muller (4)
- Most wins (constructors): (Spain) SEAT (6)

Last race (2012)
- Race 1 Winner: (France) Yvan Muller; (Chevrolet)
- Race 2 Winner: (United Kingdom) Robert Huff; (Chevrolet)

The FIA WTCC Race of Brazil was a round of the World Touring Car Championship, it was held at the Autódromo Internacional de Curitiba near the city of Curitiba in the Brazilian state of Paraná.

The race was run every year between 2006 and 2012. It was the fifth round of the 2006 season, running in July, although it was then run in March as the opening round of the season every year since 2007. The race was sponsored by HSBC from 2006 until 2010. The 2011 Race of Brazil had originally been scheduled to be held at the Autódromo José Carlos Pace in São Paulo but reverted to Curitiba a month before the event owing to renovation works being carried out at the Interlagos circuit. A Brazilian round was published on the schedule for the 2013 season published in December 2012, however in March 2013 a revised calendar was released with the Brazil round replaced by two TBA events. A slot on the 2013 calendar was kept open for a Brazilian round in the event a round could not be held in Argentina with the hope that both events would be run in 2014. In June 2013 it was confirmed that the Brazilian event would be replaced on the 2013 schedule by the 2013 FIA WTCC Race of Argentina.

Augusto Farfus is the only Brazilian driver to have won their home race, crossing the line first in race two of the 2007 Race of Brazil.

== Winners ==
Year	Race	Driver	Manufacturer	Location	Report
2012	Race 1	(France) Yvan Muller	(United States) Chevrolet	Curitiba	Report
2012	Race 2	(United Kingdom) Robert Huff	(United States) Chevrolet	Curitiba	Report
2011	Race 1	(United Kingdom) Robert Huff	(United States) Chevrolet	Curitiba	Report
2011	Race 2	(Switzerland) Alain Menu	(United States) Chevrolet	Curitiba	Report
2010	Race 1	(France) Yvan Muller	(United States) Chevrolet	Curitiba	Report
2010	Race 2	(Italy) Gabriele Tarquini	(Spain) SEAT	Curitiba	Report
2009	Race 1	(France) Yvan Muller	(Spain) SEAT	Curitiba	Report
2009	Race 2	(Italy) Gabriele Tarquini	(Spain) SEAT	Curitiba	Report
2008	Race 1	(France) Yvan Muller	(Spain) SEAT	Curitiba	Report
2008	Race 2	(Italy) Gabriele Tarquini	(Spain) SEAT	Curitiba	Report
2007	Race 1	(Germany) Jörg Müller	(Germany) BMW	Curitiba	Report
2007	Race 2	(Brazil) Augusto Farfus	(Germany) BMW	Curitiba	Report
2006	Race 1	(Spain) Jordi Gené	(Spain) SEAT	Curitiba	Report
2006	Race 2	(United Kingdom) Andy Priaulx	(Germany) BMW	Curitiba	Report

== Gallery ==
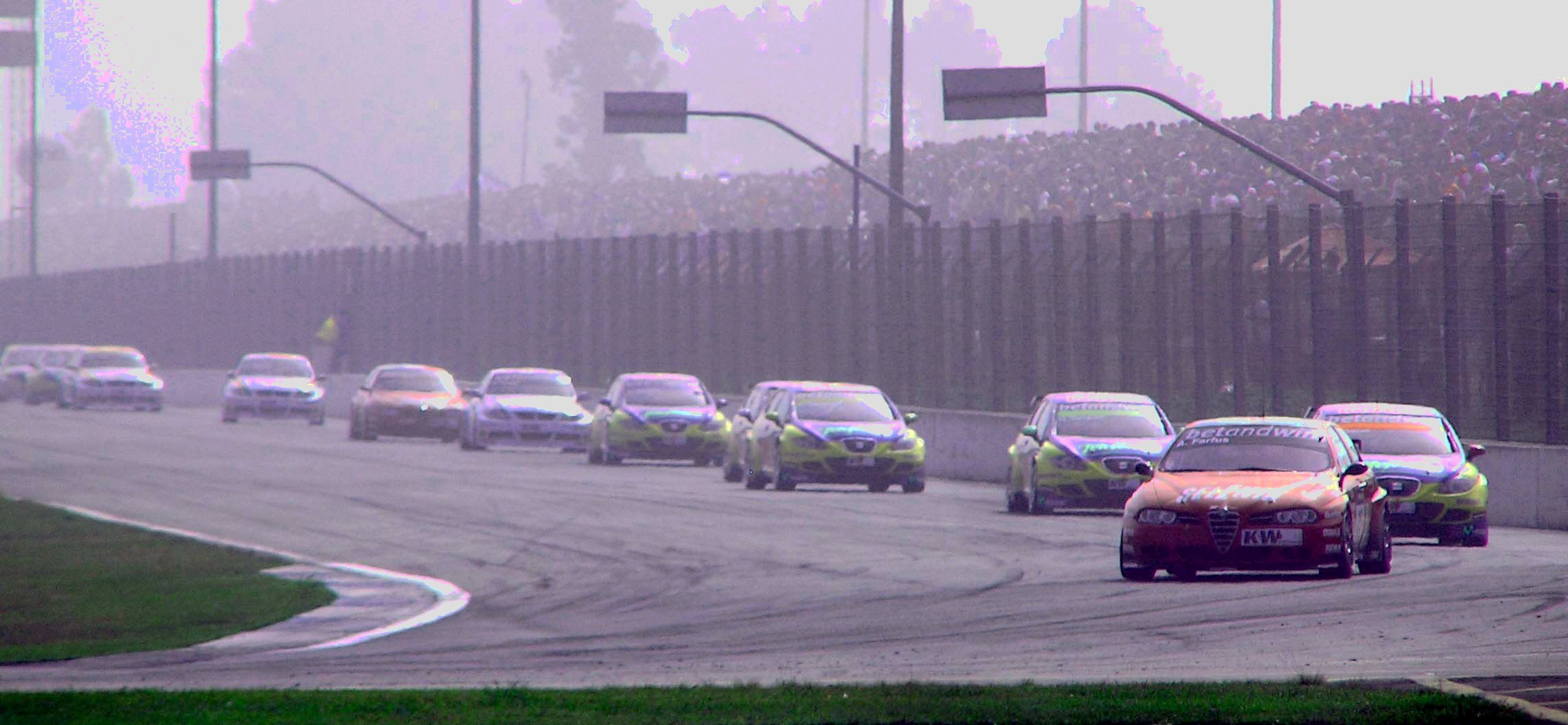
The first FIA WTCC Race of Brazil in 2006

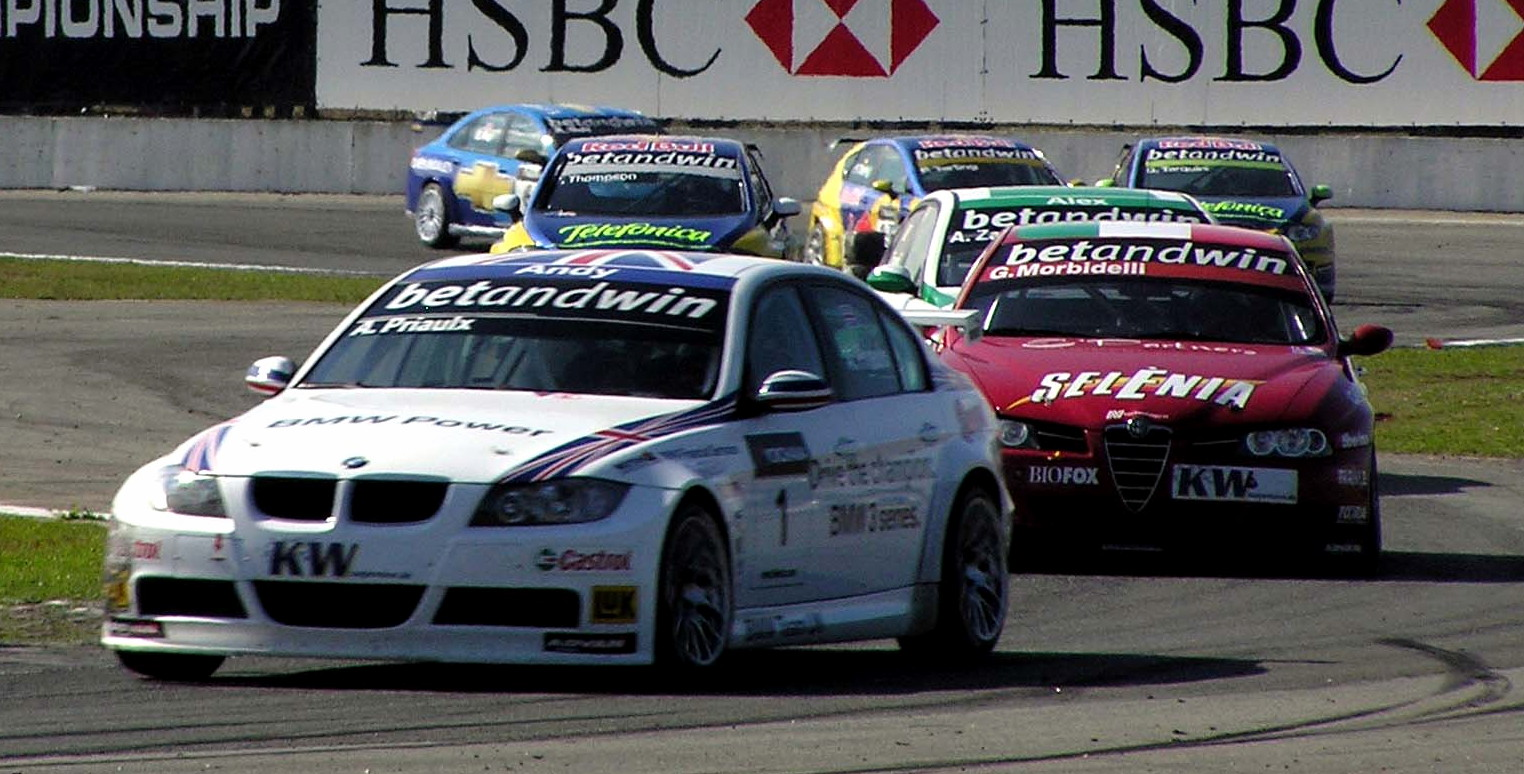
Andy Priaulx on his way to victory in 2006
