= Tim Coronel =

Dutch racing driver

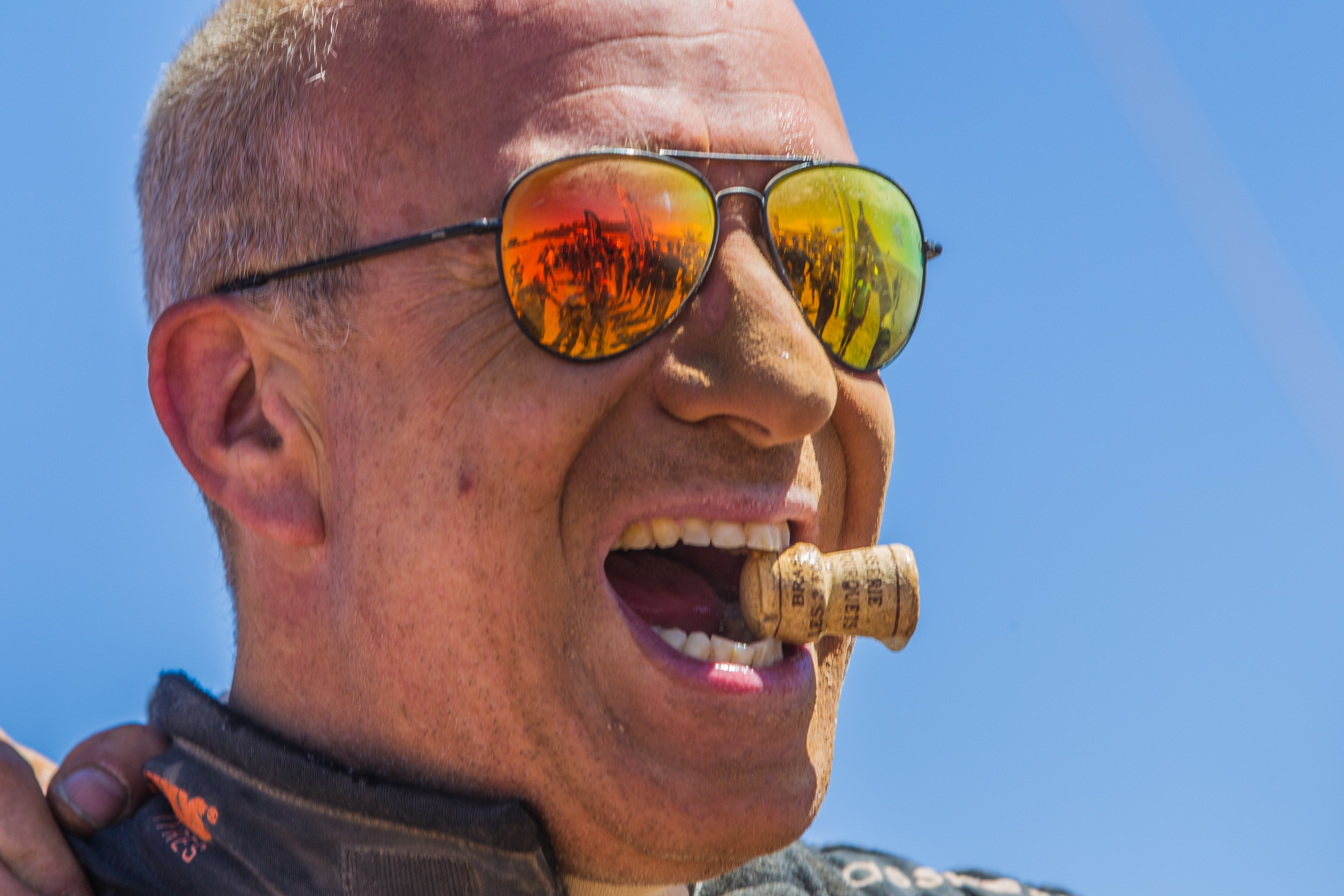
- Coronel in 2015
- Nationality: (Netherlands) Dutch
- Born: Tim Alfa Coronel; 5 April 1972 (age 54) Naarden, Netherlands
- Relatives: Tom Coronel (twin brother); Rocco Coronel (nephew)

SEAT León Eurocup career
- Debut season: 2008
- Current team: SUNRED Engineering
- Car number: 19

Previous series
- 2009 2006-08 2005 2003-04 1998–2002 1997 1995-96 1994: WTCC; Dutch BMW 130i Cup; Dutch Porsche GT3 Cup; Dutch Alfa 147 Challenge; Dutch Touring Car Championship; German F3; Formula Opel Eurocup; Dutch Citroën AX Cup

Championship titles
- 1994 2003 2005: Dutch Citroën AX Cup; Dutch Alfa 147 Challenge; Dutch Porsche GT3 Cup

Tim Alfa Coronel (born 5 April 1972, in Naarden) is a Dutch racing driver. He is the twin brother of World Touring Car Championship driver Tom Coronel.

== Racing career ==
Coronel made his first steps in racing by winning the Dutch Citroën AX Cup in 1994 as a 22-year-old. He followed this with a move into single-seaters finishing seventh and then fifth in two years in the Formula Opel Eurocup. In 1997, he raced in German F3. He moved to Touring Cars in 1998, racing a Mitsubishi Carisma in the Dutch Championship, in which he finished eleventh, then sixth and then third over three years. He raced a Lexus IS200 in 2001, finishing fifth, and finished fourth in a Renault Clio in 2002. He won the Dutch Alfa Romeo 147 Challenge in 2003 and the Dutch Porsche GT3 Cup in 2005. Between 2006 and 2008, he raced in the Dutch BMW 130i Cup, before moving onto the SEAT León Eurocup for 2009. At the opening round at Valencia, he finished third and fourth in the two races, making him the top scorer of the weekend, meaning he won a one-off drive in a SEAT León TFSI for SUNRED Engineering at the next round of the World Touring Car Championship (which the SEAT León Eurocup supports) at Brno. SUNRED Engineering is also the team that his twin brother Tom drives for in the WTCC.

In January 2009, Tim and Tom Coronel competed in the Dakar Rally in a Bowler Nemesis. He competed again in the 2010 and 2011 Dakar rally in a McRae Buggy and won the solo-class both times. In 2012, Coronel made his fifth appearance in the Dakar Rally, again with the McRae Buggy, after plans for a full electrical version of Buggy turned out to be too ambitious.

== Racing record ==
=== Complete World Touring Car Championship results ===
(key) (Races in bold indicate pole position) (Races in italics indicate fastest lap)

Year	Team	Car	1	2	3	4	5	6	7	8	9	10	11	12	13	14	15	16	17	18	19	20	21	22	23	24	DC	Pts
2009	SUNRED Engineering	SEAT León 2.0 TFSI	BRA; 1	BRA; 2	MEX; 1	MEX; 2	MAR; 1	MAR; 2	FRA; 1	FRA; 2	ESP; 1	ESP; 2	CZE; 1; 12	CZE; 2; 16	POR; 1	POR; 2	GBR; 1	GBR; 2	GER; 1	GER; 2	ITA; 1	ITA; 2	JPN; 1	JPN; 2	MAC; 1	MAC; 2	NC	0
2010	Liqui Moly Team Engstler	BMW 320si	BRA; 1	BRA; 2	MAR; 1	MAR; 2	ITA; 1	ITA; 2	BEL; 1	BEL; 2	POR; 1	POR; 2	GBR; 1; 20	GBR; 2; 15	CZE; 1	CZE; 2	GER; 1	GER; 2	ESP; 1	ESP; 2	JPN; 1	JPN; 2	MAC; 1	MAC; 2			NC	0

=== Dakar Rally results ===
Year	Class	Vehicle	Position	Stages won
2007	Cars	(United Kingdom) Bowler	46th	0
2008	Event cancelled – replaced by the 2008 Central Europe Rally			
2009	Cars	(United Kingdom) Bowler	71st	0
2010	Cars	(United Kingdom) McRae	50th	0
2011	Cars	(United Kingdom) McRae	36th	0
2012	Cars	(United Kingdom) McRae	44th	0
2013	Cars	(Japan) Suzuki	56th	0
2014	Cars	(Japan) Suzuki	DNF	0
2015	Cars	(Netherlands) GoKoBra	DNF	0
2016	Cars	(Japan) Suzuki	35th	0
2017	Cars	(United States) Jefferies	45th	0
2018	Cars	(United States) Jefferies	35th	0
2019	Cars	(United States) Jefferies	43rd	0
2020	Cars	(United States) Jefferies	28th	0
2021	Cars	(United States) Jefferies	26th	0
2022	Cars	(South Africa) Century	DNF	0
