= 2010 FIA WTCC Race of UK =

Sixth round of the 2010 World Touring Car Championship

(United Kingdom) 2010 FIA WTCC Race of UK
Race details
- Round 6 of 11 in the 2010 World Touring Car Championship at Brands Hatch in Kent, England.
- Date: 18 July, 2010
- Location: Kent, England
- Course: Brands Hatch; 3.908 kilometres (2.428 mi)

Race One
- Laps: 16
Pole position
Driver		(France) Yvan Muller	Chevrolet RML
Time		1:32.658	
Podium
First		(France) Yvan Muller	Chevrolet RML
Second		(United Kingdom) Robert Huff	Chevrolet RML
Third		(United Kingdom) Colin Turkington	eBay Motors
Fastest Lap
Driver		(United Kingdom) Andy Priaulx	BMW Team RBM
Time		1:34.078	

Race Two
- Laps: 16
Podium
First		(United Kingdom) Andy Priaulx	BMW Team RBM
Second		(United Kingdom) Colin Turkington	eBay Motors
Third		(Italy) Gabriele Tarquini	SR-Sport
Fastest Lap
Driver		(United Kingdom) Andy Priaulx	BMW Team RBM
Time		1:34.791	

The 2010 FIA WTCC Race of UK (formally the 2010 FIA WTCC Marriott Race of UK) was the sixth round of the 2010 World Touring Car Championship season and the sixth running of the FIA WTCC Race of UK. It was held at Brands Hatch in Kent, England on 18 July 2010. The two races were won by Yvan Muller of Chevrolet RML and Andy Priaulx of BMW Team RBM.

== Background ==
After the Race of Portugal, Chevrolet driver Muller was leading the drivers' championship while Sergio Hernández was leading the Yokohama Independents' Trophy.

Chevrolet RML ran an additional Chevrolet Cruze for triple Stock Car Brasil champion Cacá Bueno. Liqui Moly Team Engstler replaced regular driver Andrei Romanov with SEAT León Eurocup driver Tim Coronel. British Touring Car Championship regular Tom Boardman returned to the WTCC in a SUNRED Engineering run SEAT León TFSI. Volvo Olsbergs Green Racing joined the grid for the first of two events with their Scandinavian Touring Car Cup driver Robert Dahlgren.

== Report ==
=== Free practice ===
Robert Huff topped the opening practice session of his home event on Saturday morning, the Chevrolet driver beating the BMW pairing of Andy Priaulx and Augusto Farfus. Gabriele Tarquini was the fastest SEAT driver in fourth. Colin Turkington was seventh in his eBay Motors run BMW, Boardman was thirteenth in his SUNRED SEAT and Harry Vaulkhard was the slowest of the local drivers, 22nd in his bamboo-engineering Chevrolet Lacetti. The session was interrupted when Michel Nykjær beached his car in the gravel trap at Paddock Hill bend.

Turkington led the final practice session, running three–tenths quicker than Alain Menu's Chevrolet. Wiechers-Sport driver Mehdi Bennani was black flagged for repeatedly exceeding the track limits.

=== Qualifying ===
With guest driver Dahlgren running inside the top ten during the practice sessions and Q1 in his nationally-homologated Volvo C30, the stewards decided to allow the fastest 11 drivers through into Q2, rather than the usual ten. In the end, Dahlgren could only managed 12th in Q1, allowing 11th-placed Tom Coronel through to Q2. Muller was quickest in Q1, ahead of Chevrolet teammates Huff and Menu.

Muller took pole position in Q2, with Huff and Menu second and third once again. Independent racer Turkington was fourth quickest, ahead of Tarquini and Priaulx.

=== Warm-Up ===
Turkington was quickest in the Sunday morning warm–up session, with Priaulx and Farfus behind completing a BMW 1–2–3. Pole sitter Muller was seventh behind the independent BMW of Kristian Poulsen.

=== Race One ===
Muller lead his Chevrolet teammates Huff and Menu away from the start of the first race. Tarquini moved ahead of Turkington for fourth, while Priaulx, who had to start 16th after an engine change, moved up to 12th. On lap four, Turkington regained fourth from Tarquini at the Druids hairpin. At the same time, Priaulx and teammate Farfus moved up to ninth and tenth past Fredy Barth, before passing eighth placed Norbert Michelisz. Farfus passed Tiago Monteiro for seventh, but Priaulx could not find a way through. Nearer the front, Menu was defending hard from Turkington, allowing Muller and Huff to escape ahead. Bueno pulled off in the fourth Chevrolet with an engine fire, bringing out the safety car. After the restart, Priaulx made a robust move on Monteiro for eighth and pole position for Race Two. On the penultimate lap Turkington got past Menu, who then dropped back on the final lap to seventh to get himself a front row start for Race Two.

Muller took the chequered flag ahead of Huff and Turkington. Tarquni and Tom Coronel finished fourth and fifth, ahead of Farfus, Menu and Priaulx.

=== Race Two ===
Farfus made a good start to Race Two from third on the grid to take the lead ahead of Priaulx and Menu. Further down, Barth and Poulsen made contact off the grid, putting Poulsen into the wall on the outside and giving Barth a slow puncture. At the end of the first lap, Boardman made contact with Monteiro, putting Monteiro out of the race. On lap three, Priaulx passed Farfus for the lead at Druids, with Menu attempting to follow him past the Brazilian. However, they made contact, putting Farfus into a spin and damaging Menu's steering. Turkington took advantage to move up to second behind Priaulx, with Tarquini, Coronel, Huff and Muller following.

Later on, Bennani hit Franz Engstler into a spin as the pair were fighting over tenth place. Muller passed Chevrolet teammate Huff for fifth. Farfus passed Boardman for ninth, before Boardman ran wide and retired from the race. Meanwhile, Bennani pushed Darryl O'Young into the gravel at Druids, bringing out the safety car. Farfus took eighth from Nykjær in the closing laps.

Priaulx crossed the line to take the victory ahead of Turkington and Tarquini. Coronel finished fourth ahead of Muller, Huff, Michelisz and Farfus.

== Results ==
=== Qualifying ===
Pos.	No.	Name	Team	Car	C	Q1	Q2
1	6	(France) Yvan Muller	Chevrolet RML	Chevrolet Cruze LT		1:32.658	1:32.481
2	7	(United Kingdom) Robert Huff	Chevrolet RML	Chevrolet Cruze LT		1:32.922	1:32.678
3	8	(Switzerland) Alain Menu	Chevrolet RML	Chevrolet Cruze LT		1:33.128	1:32.828
4	29	(United Kingdom) Colin Turkington	eBay Motors	BMW 320si	Y	1:33.306	1:32.842
5	1	(Italy) Gabriele Tarquini	SR-Sport	SEAT León 2.0 TDI		1:33.157	1:32.873
6	11	(United Kingdom) Andy Priaulx	BMW Team RBM	BMW 320si		1:33.239	1:32.973
7	2	(Netherlands) Tom Coronel	SR-Sport	SEAT León 2.0 TDI		1:33.549	1:33.176
8	3	(Portugal) Tiago Monteiro	SR-Sport	SEAT León 2.0 TDI		1:33.272	1:33.257
9	5	(Hungary) Norbert Michelisz	Zengő-Dension Team	SEAT León 2.0 TDI		1:33.441	1:33.261
10	10	(Brazil) Augusto Farfus	BMW Team RBM	BMW 320si		1:33.448	1:33.337
11	15	(Germany) Franz Engstler	Liqui Moly Team Engstler	BMW 320si	Y	1:33.454	1:35.164
12	41	(Sweden) Robert Dahlgren	Volvo Olsbergs Green Racing	Volvo C30		1:33.579	
13	4	(Spain) Jordi Gené	SR-Sport	SEAT León 2.0 TDI		1:33.588	
14	18	(Switzerland) Fredy Barth	SEAT Swiss Racing by SUNRED	SEAT León 2.0 TDI		1:33.803	
15	20	(Hong Kong) Darryl O'Young	bamboo-engineering	Chevrolet Lacetti	Y	1:33.911	
16	9	(Brazil) Cacá Bueno	Chevrolet RML	Chevrolet Cruze LT		1:34.122	
17	38	(United Kingdom) Tom Boardman	SUNRED Engineering	SEAT León 2.0 TFSI	Y	1:34.409	
18	17	(Denmark) Michel Nykjær	SUNRED Engineering	SEAT León 2.0 TDI		1:34.419	
19	26	(Italy) Stefano D'Aste	Scuderia Proteam Motorsport	BMW 320si	Y	1:34.437	
20	25	(Spain) Sergio Hernández	Scuderia Proteam Motorsport	BMW 320si	Y	1:34.594	
21	21	(Morocco) Mehdi Bennani	Wiechers-Sport	BMW 320si	Y	1:34.722	
22	19	(United Kingdom) Harry Vaulkhard	bamboo-engineering	Chevrolet Lacetti	Y	1:34.736	
EX^{1}	24	(Denmark) Kristian Poulsen	Poulsen Motorsport	BMW 320si	Y	Excluded	
107% time: 1:39.144
–	42	(Netherlands) Tim Coronel	Liqui Moly Team Engstler	BMW 320si	Y	12:42.010	

^1 — Poulsen was originally classified fifteenth in Q1 but had all his times deleted for breaching parc ferme regulations.

=== Race 1 ===
Pos.	No.	Name	Team	Car	C	Laps	Time/Retired	Grid	Points
1	6	(France) Yvan Muller	Chevrolet RML	Chevrolet Cruze LT		16	28:05.204	1	25
2	7	(United Kingdom) Robert Huff	Chevrolet RML	Chevrolet Cruze LT		16	+0.296	2	18
3	29	(United Kingdom) Colin Turkington	eBay Motors	BMW 320si	Y	16	+0.848	4	15
4	1	(Italy) Gabriele Tarquini	SR-Sport	SEAT León 2.0 TDI		16	+2.615	5	12
5	2	(Netherlands) Tom Coronel	SR-Sport	SEAT León 2.0 TDI		16	+3.158	6	10
6	10	(Brazil) Augusto Farfus	BMW Team RBM	BMW 320si		16	+4.357	9	8
7	11	(United Kingdom) **Andy Priaulx**	BMW Team RBM	BMW 320si		16	+5.170	16	6
8	3	(Portugal) Tiago Monteiro	SR-Sport	SEAT León 2.0 TDI		16	+5.295	7	4
9	5	(Hungary) Norbert Michelisz	Zengő-Dension Team	SEAT León 2.0 TDI		16	+5.505	8	2
10	4	(Spain) Jordi Gené	SR-Sport	SEAT León 2.0 TDI		16	+6.103	12	1
11	18	(Switzerland) Fredy Barth	SEAT Swiss Racing by SUNRED	SEAT León 2.0 TDI		16	+6.460	13	
12	41	(Sweden) Robert Dahlgren	Volvo Olsbergs Green Racing	Volvo C30		16	+6.988	11	
13	38	(United Kingdom) Tom Boardman	SUNRED Engineering	SEAT León 2.0 TFSI	Y	16	+9.405	17	
14	15	(Germany) Franz Engstler	Liqui Moly Team Engstler	BMW 320si	Y	16	+9.602	10	
15	17	(Denmark) Michel Nykjær	SUNRED Engineering	SEAT León 2.0 TDI		16	+10.661	18	
16	25	(Spain) Sergio Hernández	Scuderia Proteam Motorsport	BMW 320si	Y	16	+12.540	20	
17	19	(United Kingdom) Harry Vaulkhard	bamboo-engineering	Chevrolet Lacetti	Y	16	+12.979	22	
18	26	(Italy) Stefano D'Aste	Scuderia Proteam Motorsport	BMW 320si	Y	16	+14.108	19	
19	21	(Morocco) Mehdi Bennani	Wiechers-Sport	BMW 320si	Y	16	+14.497	21	
20	42	(Netherlands) Tim Coronel	Liqui Moly Team Engstler	BMW 320si	Y	16	+15.220	23	
21	20	(Hong Kong) Darryl O'Young	bamboo-engineering	Chevrolet Lacetti	Y	16	+19.150	14	
22	8	(Switzerland) Alain Menu	Chevrolet RML	Chevrolet Cruze LT		16	+35.041	3	
23	24	(Denmark) Kristian Poulsen	Poulsen Motorsport	BMW 320si	Y	16	+40.148	24	
Ret	9	(Brazil) Cacá Bueno	Chevrolet RML	Chevrolet Cruze LT		7	Engine fire	15	

- **Bold** denotes Fastest lap.

=== Race 2 ===
Pos.	No.	Name	Team	Car	C	Laps	Time/Retired	Grid	Points
1	11	(United Kingdom) **Andy Priaulx**	BMW Team RBM	BMW 320si		16	27:05.324	1	25
2	29	(United Kingdom) Colin Turkington	eBay Motors	BMW 320si	Y	16	+0.399	6	18
3	1	(Italy) Gabriele Tarquini	SR-Sport	SEAT León 2.0 TDI		16	+1.394	5	15
4	2	(Netherlands) Tom Coronel	SR-Sport	SEAT León 2.0 TDI		16	+1.854	4	12
5	6	(France) Yvan Muller	Chevrolet RML	Chevrolet Cruze LT		16	+3.037	8	10
6	7	(United Kingdom) Robert Huff	Chevrolet RML	Chevrolet Cruze LT		16	+3.418	7	8
7	5	(Hungary) Norbert Michelisz	Zengő-Dension Team	SEAT León 2.0 TDI		16	+4.901	10	6
8	10	(Brazil) Augusto Farfus	BMW Team RBM	BMW 320si		16	+5.529	3	4
9	17	(Denmark) Michel Nykjær	SUNRED Engineering	SEAT León 2.0 TDI		16	+6.035	17	2
10	4	(Spain) Jordi Gené	SR-Sport	SEAT León 2.0 TDI		16	+6.481	11	1
11	26	(Italy) Stefano D'Aste	Scuderia Proteam Motorsport	BMW 320si	Y	16	+7.293	20	
12	25	(Spain) Sergio Hernández	Scuderia Proteam Motorsport	BMW 320si	Y	16	+7.604	18	
13	15	(Germany) Franz Engstler	Liqui Moly Team Engstler	BMW 320si	Y	16	+9.561	15	
14	19	(United Kingdom) Harry Vaulkhard	bamboo-engineering	Chevrolet Lacetti	Y	16	+11.172	19	
15	42	(Netherlands) Tim Coronel	Liqui Moly Team Engstler	BMW 320si	Y	16	+13.151	22	
NC	8	(Switzerland) Alain Menu	Chevrolet RML	Chevrolet Cruze LT		11	+5 Laps	2	
Ret	38	(United Kingdom) Tom Boardman	SUNRED Engineering	SEAT León 2.0 TFSI	Y	10	Race incident	14	
Ret	20	(Hong Kong) Darryl O'Young	bamboo-engineering	Chevrolet Lacetti	Y	10	Race incident	23	
Ret	21	(Morocco) Mehdi Bennani	Wiechers-Sport	BMW 320si	Y	10	Race incident	21	
Ret	3	(Portugal) Tiago Monteiro	SR-Sport	SEAT León 2.0 TDI		1	Race incident	9	
Ret	18	(Switzerland) Fredy Barth	SEAT Swiss Racing by SUNRED	SEAT León 2.0 TDI		0	Race incident	12	
Ret	24	(Denmark) Kristian Poulsen	Poulsen Motorsport	BMW 320si	Y	0	Race incident	16	
Ret	41	(Sweden) Robert Dahlgren	Volvo Olsbergs Green Racing	Volvo C30		0	Water pipe	13	
DNS	9	(Brazil) Cacá Bueno	Chevrolet RML	Chevrolet Cruze LT		0	Did not start	24	

- **Bold** denotes Fastest lap.

== Standings after the event ==
Drivers' Championship standings

Pos	Driver	Points
1	(France) Yvan Muller	199
2	(Italy) Gabriele Tarquini	176
3	(United Kingdom) Andy Priaulx	148
4	(United Kingdom) Robert Huff	130
5	(Portugal) Tiago Monteiro	103

Yokohama Independents' Trophy standings

	Pos	Driver	Points
	1	(Spain) Sergio Hernández	84
6	2	(United Kingdom) Colin Turkington	72
	3	(Italy) Stefano D'Aste	62
2	4	(Hong Kong) Darryl O'Young	56
1	5	(Germany) Franz Engstler	55

Manufacturers' Championship standings

Pos	Manufacturer	Points
1	(United States) Chevrolet	378
2	(Spain) SEAT Customers Technology	361
3	(Germany) BMW	317

- Note: Only the top five positions are included for both sets of drivers' standings.
