= Kristian Poulsen =

Danish racing driver

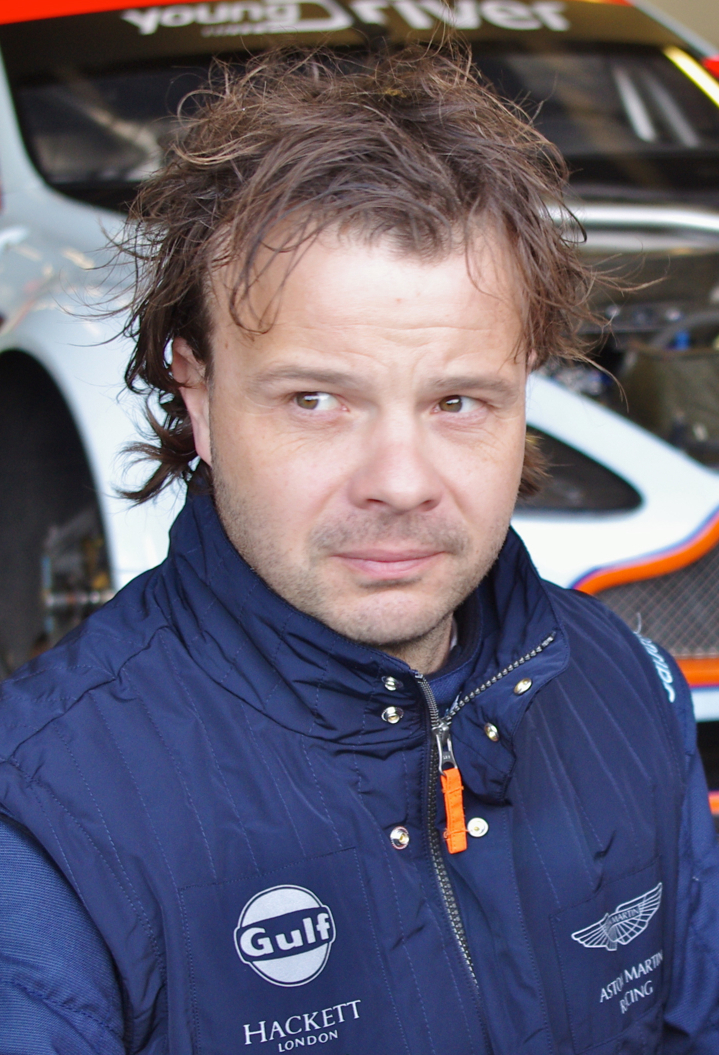
- Poulsen at the 2013 6 Hours of Silverstone
- Nationality: Danish
- Born: 18 November 1975 (age 50) Flensburg, West Germany

World Touring Car Championship career
- Debut season: 2008
- Current team: Poulsen Motorsport
- Categorisation: FIA Silver (until 2013, 2015–); FIA Bronze (2014)
- Car number: 24
- Former teams: Liqui Moly Team Engstler
- Starts: 34
- Wins: 0
- Poles: 0
- Fastest laps: 0
- Best finish: 14th in 2010

Previous series
- 2008 2007–08 2007–08: Danish Historic Racing Championship; European Touring Car Cup; Danish Touringcar Championship

24 Hours of Le Mans career
- Years: 2009, 2012–2015
- Teams: Team Essex
- Best finish: 10th
- Class wins: 2

Kristian Poulsen (born 18 November 1975) is a Danish auto racing driver, who currently competes in touring car racing.

== Career ==
Poulsen made his debut in the FIA World Touring Car Championship in 2008 with a part season. For 2009, he would compete a full season in the WTCC with Liqui Moly Team Engstler in a BMW 320si alongside team owner, Franz Engstler. He has previously raced in karting and rallying in the World Rally Championship from 1995. He switched to touring cars in 2007, when he competed in his native Danish Touringcar Championship. He won the LMP2 class at the 2009 24 Hours of Le Mans in the Team Essex Porsche RS Spyder alongside Emmanuel Collard and Casper Elgaard. Poulsen currently drives the BMW 320si for Liqui Moly Team Engstler alongside Franz Engstler in the World Touring Car Championship.

== Racing record ==
=== Complete World Touring Car Championship results ===
(key) (Races in bold indicate pole position) (Races in italics indicate fastest lap)

Year	Team	Car	1	2	3	4	5	6	7	8	9	10	11	12	13	14	15	16	17	18	19	20	21	22	23	24	DC	Points
2008	Poulsen Motorsport	BMW 320si	BRA; 1	BRA; 2	MEX; 1	MEX; 2	ESP; 1	ESP; 2	FRA; 1	FRA; 2	CZE; 1	CZE; 2	POR; 1; 14	POR; 2; 22	GBR; 1; 15	GBR; 2; 17	GER; 1; 18	GER; 2; 14	EUR; 1	EUR; 2							NC	0
2008	Wiechers-Sport	BMW 320si																			ITA; 1; 23	ITA; 2; 15	JPN; 1	JPN; 2	MAC; 1	MAC; 2	NC	0
2009	Liqui Moly Team Engstler	BMW 320si	BRA; 1; 20	BRA; 2; 18	MEX; 1 Ret	MEX; 2 Ret	MAR; 1 Ret	MAR; 2 Ret	FRA; 1; 15	FRA; 2; 10	ESP; 1 Ret	ESP; 2; 20	CZE; 1 Ret	CZE; 2; 21	POR; 1; 17	POR; 2; 16	GBR; 1; 20	GBR; 2 Ret	GER; 1; 12	GER; 2; 22	ITA; 1; 16	ITA; 2; 19	JPN; 1; 19	JPN; 2 Ret	MAC; 1; 17	MAC; 2 Ret	NC	0
2010	Poulsen Motorsport	BMW 320si	BRA; 1	BRA; 2	MAR; 1	MAR; 2	ITA; 1 Ret	ITA; 2; 15	BEL; 1; 11	BEL; 2; 11	POR; 1; 11	POR; 2 Ret	GBR; 1; 23	GBR; 2 Ret	CZE; 1; 8	CZE; 2; 19	GER; 1; 9	GER; 2; 6	ESP; 1; 12	ESP; 2; 10	JPN; 1; 15	JPN; 2; 11	MAC; 1; 8	MAC; 2 Ret			14th	20
2011	Liqui Moly Team Engstler	BMW 320 TC	BRA; 1; 5	BRA; 2; 14	BEL; 1; 6	BEL; 2 Ret	ITA; 1; 6	ITA; 2; 3	HUN; 1; 9	HUN; 2; 13	CZE; 1; 5	CZE; 2; 8	POR; 1; 14	POR; 2; 19	GBR; 1; 9	GBR; 2; 17	GER; 1; 13	GER; 2 Ret	ESP; 1; 4	ESP; 2; 5	JPN; 1; 5	JPN; 2; 10	CHN; 1; 6	CHN; 2; 7	MAC; 1; 7	MAC; 2; 13	7th	112

=== 24 Hours of Le Mans results ===
Year	Team	Co-Drivers	Car	Class	Laps	Pos.	Class Pos.
2009	(Denmark) Team Essex	(Denmark) Casper Elgaard (France) Emmanuel Collard	Porsche RS Spyder Evo	LMP2	357	10th	**1st**
2012	(United Kingdom) Aston Martin Racing	(Denmark) Christoffer Nygaard (Denmark) Allan Simonsen	Aston Martin Vantage GTE	GTE; Am	31	DNF	DNF
2013	(United Kingdom) Aston Martin Racing	(Denmark) Christoffer Nygaard (Denmark) Allan Simonsen ^{1}	Aston Martin Vantage GTE	GTE; Am	2	DNF^{1}	DNF^{1}
2014	(United Kingdom) Aston Martin Racing	(Denmark) David Heinemeier Hansson (Denmark) Nicki Thiim	Aston Martin Vantage GTE	GTE; Am	334	17th	**1st**
2015	(France) Larbre Compétition	(Italy) Gianluca Roda (Italy) Paolo Ruberti	Chevrolet Corvette C7.R	GTE; Am	94	DNF	DNF

^{1} Simonsen was killed in a Lap 3 crash. Neither Nygaard nor Poulsen had driven at the time.

Sporting positions
Preceded by Sergio Hernández	World Touring Car Championship; Independents' Trophy winner 2011	Succeeded by Norbert Michelisz
Preceded by Jamie Campbell-Walter; Stuart Hall	FIA Endurance Trophy for LMGTE Am Drivers; 2014 with: David Heinemeier Hansson	Succeeded by Aleksey Basov; Andrea Bertolini; Viktor Shaitar
