= 2010 FIA WTCC Race of Belgium =

Race details
- Round 4 of 11 in the 2010 World Touring Car Championship at Zolder in Heusden-Zolder, Belgium.
- Date: 20 June, 2010
- Location: Heusden-Zolder, Belgium
- Course: Zolder; 4.006 kilometres (2.489 mi)

Race One
- Laps: 13
Pole position
Driver		(Italy) Gabriele Tarquini	SR-Sport
Time		1:38.265	
Podium
First		(Italy) Gabriele Tarquini	SR-Sport
Second		(France) Yvan Muller	Chevrolet RML
Third		(Switzerland) Alain Menu	Chevrolet RML
Fastest Lap
Driver		(United Kingdom) Andy Priaulx	BMW Team RBM
Time		1:40.138	

Race Two
- Laps: 13
Podium
First		(United Kingdom) Andy Priaulx	BMW Team RBM
Second		(United Kingdom) Robert Huff	Chevrolet RML
Third		(Portugal) Tiago Monteiro	SR-Sport
Fastest Lap
Driver		(United Kingdom) Andy Priaulx	BMW Team RBM
Time		1:40.181	

The 2010 FIA WTCC Race of Belgium (formally the 2010 FIA WTCC Monroe Race of Belgium) was the fourth round of the 2010 World Touring Car Championship season and the second running of the FIA WTCC Race of Belgium. It was held at Circuit Zolder, near Heusden-Zolder, Belgium on 20 June 2010. It saw the return of the Race of Belgium to the championship, after it was last held at the Circuit de Spa-Francorchamps in 2005. The first race was won by Gabriele Tarquini for SR-Sport and the second race was won by Andy Priaulx for BMW Team RBM.

== Background ==
After round three, Yvan Muller was leading the championship on 100 points, 24 ahead of Tarquini and Chevrolet RML teammate Robert Huff. Sergio Hernández was leading the Yokohama Independents' Trophy.

Two Belgian drivers joined the field for the event, with Vincent Radermecker joining the factory Chevrolet RML team, while Pierre-Yves Corthals returned to the WTCC in an Exagon Engineering run SEAT León 2.0 TFSI.

== Report ==
=== Testing and free practice ===
Augusto Farfus set the fastest time in Friday testing, with his team–mate Priaulx finishing third. Between them was the Chevrolet Cruze of championship leader Muller. Darryl O'Young in the bamboo-engineering Chevrolet Lacetti was fourth fastest and the lead independent driver. Alain Menu and Huff saw reduced running thanks to technical problems. Radermecker was the fastest of the two Belgian drivers in tenth. Corthals was 21st in the sole petrol SEAT entry.

Tiago Monteiro was quickest in the drying conditions of free practice one on Saturday morning, with team–mates Tom Coronel and Jordi Gené second and third. Farfus was the top BMW in fourth and seventh placed Menu was the leading Chevrolet.

Gené led the final practice session with Monteiro second, Muller third and Menu in fourth. Harry Vaulkhard was the fastest independent driver in fifth. The session was brought to a close four minutes early when the engine in Tarquini's SEAT blew, bringing out the red flags.

=== Qualifying ===
Alain Menu was fastest in Q1 for Chevrolet, ahead of SR-Sport's Tiago Monteiro and Gabriele Tarquini. The most notable casualty from the session was Tom Coronel, who was 11th fastest.

In the ten-minute Q2 session, eight of the ten competing cars set their first flying laptimes before rain began to fall over the circuit. Tarquini was fastest ahead of teammate Jordi Gené, Chevrolet teammates Menu and Yvan Muller and the SEATs of Norbert Michelisz, Fredy Barth and Monteiro. The BMW Team RBM pairing of Andy Priaulx and Augusto Farfus did not set times until after the rain arrived, meaning they could only set the ninth and tenth fastest times.

=== Warm-Up ===
BMW Team RBM pair Priaulx and Farfus led Sunday morning warm–up.

=== Race One ===
At the start of the race, pole sitter Tarquini was passed by SR-Sport teammate Gené. However, the Spaniard's start was put under investigation, as tt appeared that Gené was ahead of Tarquini as the pair crossed the line for the rolling start. Further behind, contact behind O'Young and Michel Nykjær put O'Young in the gravel, but he managed to rejoin the back of the pack. As the leaders remained in order, Kristian Poulsen passed Corthals for the independents lead and 12th place overall. Having dropped back to tenth place early on, Priaulx passed Coronel for eighth place and pole position for the reverse grid second race. Gené meanwhile took the victory ahead of Tarquini, Muller, Menu and Monteiro.

After the second race of the day, Gené was disqualified for a technical infringement, handing the victory to Tarquini.

=== Race Two ===
Polesitter Priaulx made a good start to Race Two. Fellow front-row starter Norbert Michelisz made a slow getaway, dropping him to eighth. Coronel also made a slow start from ninth place. Priaulx, Huff, Monteiro, Menu and Muller followed each other around until the end of the race. Farfus attempted to pass Tarquini for sixth around the outside of turn one, but ran wide and dropped back to eighth behind Michelisz. Hernández took the independents victory in ninth position ahead of Coronel.

== Results ==
=== Qualifying ===
Pos.	No.	Name	Team	Car	C	Q1	Q2
1	1	(Italy) Gabriele Tarquini	SR-Sport	SEAT León 2.0 TDI		1:38.999	1:38.265
2	4	(Spain) Jordi Gené	SR-Sport	SEAT León 2.0 TDI		1:39.061	1:38.430
3	8	(Switzerland) Alain Menu	Chevrolet RML	Chevrolet Cruze LT		1:38.840	1:38.494
4	6	(France) Yvan Muller	Chevrolet RML	Chevrolet Cruze LT		1:39.037	1:38.584
5	7	(United Kingdom) Robert Huff	Chevrolet RML	Chevrolet Cruze LT		1:39.187	1:38.779
6	5	(Hungary) Norbert Michelisz	Zengő-Dension Team	SEAT León 2.0 TDI		1:39.072	1:39.072
7	18	(Switzerland) Fredy Barth	SEAT Swiss Racing by SUNRED	SEAT León 2.0 TDI		1:39.151	1:39.173
8	3	(Portugal) Tiago Monteiro	SR-Sport	SEAT León 2.0 TDI		1:38.875	1:39.255
9	11	(United Kingdom) Andy Priaulx	BMW Team RBM	BMW 320si		1:39.030	1:42.856
10	10	(Brazil) Augusto Farfus	BMW Team RBM	BMW 320si		1:39.112	1:52.493
11	2	(Netherlands) Tom Coronel	SR-Sport	SEAT León 2.0 TDI		1:39.456	
12	17	(Denmark) Michel Nykjær	SUNRED Engineering	SEAT León 2.0 TDI		1:39.472	
13	27	(Belgium) Pierre-Yves Corthals	Exagon Engineering	SEAT León 2.0 TFSI	Y	1:39.610	
14	20	(Hong Kong) Darryl O'Young	bamboo-engineering	Chevrolet Lacetti	Y	1:39.824	
15	24	(Denmark) Kristian Poulsen	Poulsen Motorsport	BMW 320si	Y	1:39.863	
16	35	(Belgium) Vincent Radermecker	Chevrolet RML	Chevrolet Cruze LT		1:40.003	
17	15	(Germany) Franz Engstler	Liqui Moly Team Engstler	BMW 320si	Y	1:40.058	
18	25	(Spain) Sergio Hernández	Scuderia Proteam Motorsport	BMW 320si	Y	1:40.278	
19	26	(Italy) Stefano D'Aste	Scuderia Proteam Motorsport	BMW 320si	Y	1:40.287	
20	19	(United Kingdom) Harry Vaulkhard	bamboo-engineering	Chevrolet Lacetti	Y	1:40.395	
21	21	(Morocco) Mehdi Bennani	Wiechers-Sport	BMW 320si	Y	1:40.738	
22	16	(Russia) Andrei Romanov	Liqui Moly Team Engstler	BMW 320si	Y	1:42.934	

=== Race 1 ===
Pos.	No.	Name	Team	Car	C	Laps	Time/Retired	Grid	Points
1	1	(Italy) Gabriele Tarquini	SR-Sport	SEAT León 2.0 TDI		13	21:54.209	1	25
2	6	(France) Yvan Muller	Chevrolet RML	Chevrolet Cruze LT		13	+2.629	4	18
3	8	(Switzerland) Alain Menu	Chevrolet RML	Chevrolet Cruze LT		13	+3.056	3	15
4	3	(Portugal) Tiago Monteiro	SR-Sport	SEAT León 2.0 TDI		13	+3.559	8	12
5	7	(United Kingdom) Robert Huff	Chevrolet RML	Chevrolet Cruze LT		13	+3.866	5	10
6	5	(Hungary) Norbert Michelisz	Zengő-Dension Team	SEAT León 2.0 TDI		13	+4.192	6	8
7	11	(United Kingdom) **Andy Priaulx**	BMW Team RBM	BMW 320si		13	+4.827	9	6
8	2	(Netherlands) Tom Coronel	SR-Sport	SEAT León 2.0 TDI		13	+9.295	11	4
9	10	(Brazil) Augusto Farfus	BMW Team RBM	BMW 320si		13	+9.453	10	2
10	18	(Switzerland) Fredy Barth	SEAT Swiss Racing by SUNRED	SEAT León 2.0 TDI		13	+9.655	7	1
11	24	(Denmark) Kristian Poulsen	Poulsen Motorsport	BMW 320si	Y	13	+13.373	15	
12	27	(Belgium) Pierre-Yves Corthals	SUNRED Engineering	SEAT León 2.0 TSFI	Y	13	+15.400	13	
13	25	(Spain) Sergio Hernández	Scuderia Proteam Motorsport	BMW 320si	Y	13	+17.611	18	
14	21	(Morocco) Mehdi Bennani	Wiechers-Sport	BMW 320si	Y	13	+18.240	21	
15	19	(United Kingdom) Harry Vaulkhard	bamboo-engineering	Chevrolet Lacetti	Y	13	+19.423	20	
16	26	(Italy) Stefano D'Aste	Scuderia Proteam Motorsport	BMW 320si	Y	13	+20.491	19	
17	35	(Belgium) Vincent Radermecker	Chevrolet RML	Chevrolet Cruze LT		13	+20.877	16	
18	17	(Denmark) Michel Nykjær	SUNRED Engineering	SEAT León 2.0 TDI		13	+26.489	12	
19	16	(Russia) Andrei Romanov	Liqui Moly Team Engstler	BMW 320si	Y	13	+54.042	22	
20	20	(Hong Kong) Darryl O'Young	bamboo-engineering	Chevrolet Lacetti	Y	12	+1 Lap	14	
Ret	15	(Germany) Franz Engstler	Liqui Moly Team Engstler	BMW 320si	Y	8	Gearbox	17	
DSQ	4	(Spain) Jordi Gené	SR-Sport	SEAT León 2.0 TDI		13	Disqualified	2	

- **Bold** denotes Fastest lap.

=== Race 2 ===
Pos.	No.	Name	Team	Car	C	Laps	Time/Retired	Grid	Points
1	11	(United Kingdom) **Andy Priaulx**	BMW Team RBM	BMW 320si		13	21:52.091	1	25
2	7	(United Kingdom) Robert Huff	Chevrolet RML	Chevrolet Cruze LT		13	+1.049	3	18
3	3	(Portugal) Tiago Monteiro	SR-Sport	SEAT León 2.0 TDI		13	+1.754	4	15
4	8	(Switzerland) Alain Menu	Chevrolet RML	Chevrolet Cruze LT		13	+2.298	5	12
5	6	(France) Yvan Muller	Chevrolet RML	Chevrolet Cruze LT		13	+4.784	6	10
6	1	(Italy) Gabriele Tarquini	SR-Sport	SEAT León 2.0 TDI		13	+5.788	7	8
7	5	(Hungary) Norbert Michelisz	Zengő-Dension Team	SEAT León 2.0 TDI		13	+6.283	2	6
8	10	(Brazil) Augusto Farfus	BMW Team RBM	BMW 320si		13	+6.663	10	4
9	25	(Spain) Sergio Hernández	Scuderia Proteam Motorsport	BMW 320si	Y	13	+13.491	14	2
10	2	(Netherlands) Tom Coronel	SR-Sport	SEAT León 2.0 TDI		13	+14.810	9	1
11	24	(Denmark) Kristian Poulsen	Poulsen Motorsport	BMW 320si	Y	13	+15.063	12	
12	20	(Hong Kong) Darryl O'Young	bamboo-engineering	Chevrolet Lacetti	Y	13	+18.227	21	
13	26	(Italy) Stefano D'Aste	Scuderia Proteam Motorsport	BMW 320si	Y	13	+18.876	17	
14	35	(Belgium) Vincent Radermecker	Chevrolet RML	Chevrolet Cruze LT		13	+20.678	18	
15	27	(Belgium) Pierre-Yves Corthals	SUNRED Engineering	SEAT León 2.0 TSFI	Y	13	+23.936	13	
16	15	(Germany) Franz Engstler	Liqui Moly Team Engstler	BMW 320si	Y	13	+24.353	22	
17	16	(Russia) Andrei Romanov	Liqui Moly Team Engstler	BMW 320si	Y	13	+55.610	20	
18	18	(Switzerland) Fredy Barth	SEAT Swiss Racing by SUNRED	SEAT León 2.0 TDI		13	+57.511	11	
19	21	(Morocco) Mehdi Bennani	Wiechers-Sport	BMW 320si	Y	12	+1 Lap	15	
Ret	17	(Denmark) Michel Nykjær	SUNRED Engineering	SEAT León 2.0 TDI		7	Race incident	19	
Ret	19	(United Kingdom) Harry Vaulkhard	bamboo-engineering	Chevrolet Lacetti	Y	2	Race incident	16	
Ret	4	(Spain) Jordi Gené	SR-Sport	SEAT León 2.0 TDI		0	Turbo	8	

- **Bold** denotes Fastest lap.

== Standings after the event ==
Drivers' Championship standings

	Pos	Driver	Points
	1	(France) Yvan Muller	128
	2	(Italy) Gabriele Tarquini	109
1	3	(United Kingdom) Andy Priaulx	105
1	4	(United Kingdom) Robert Huff	104
2	5	(Portugal) Tiago Monteiro	68

Yokohama Independents' Trophy standings

Pos	Driver	Points
1	(Spain) Sergio Hernández	60
2	(Italy) Stefano D'Aste	44
3	(Morocco) Mehdi Bennani	41
4	(Germany) Franz Engstler	37
5	(United Kingdom) Harry Vaulkhard	36

Manufacturers' Championship standings

Pos	Manufacturer	Points
1	(United States) Chevrolet	256
2	(Spain) SEAT Customers Technology	239
3	(Germany) BMW	209

- Note: Only the top five positions are included for both sets of drivers' standings.
