= Harry Vaulkhard =

British racing driver (born 1985)

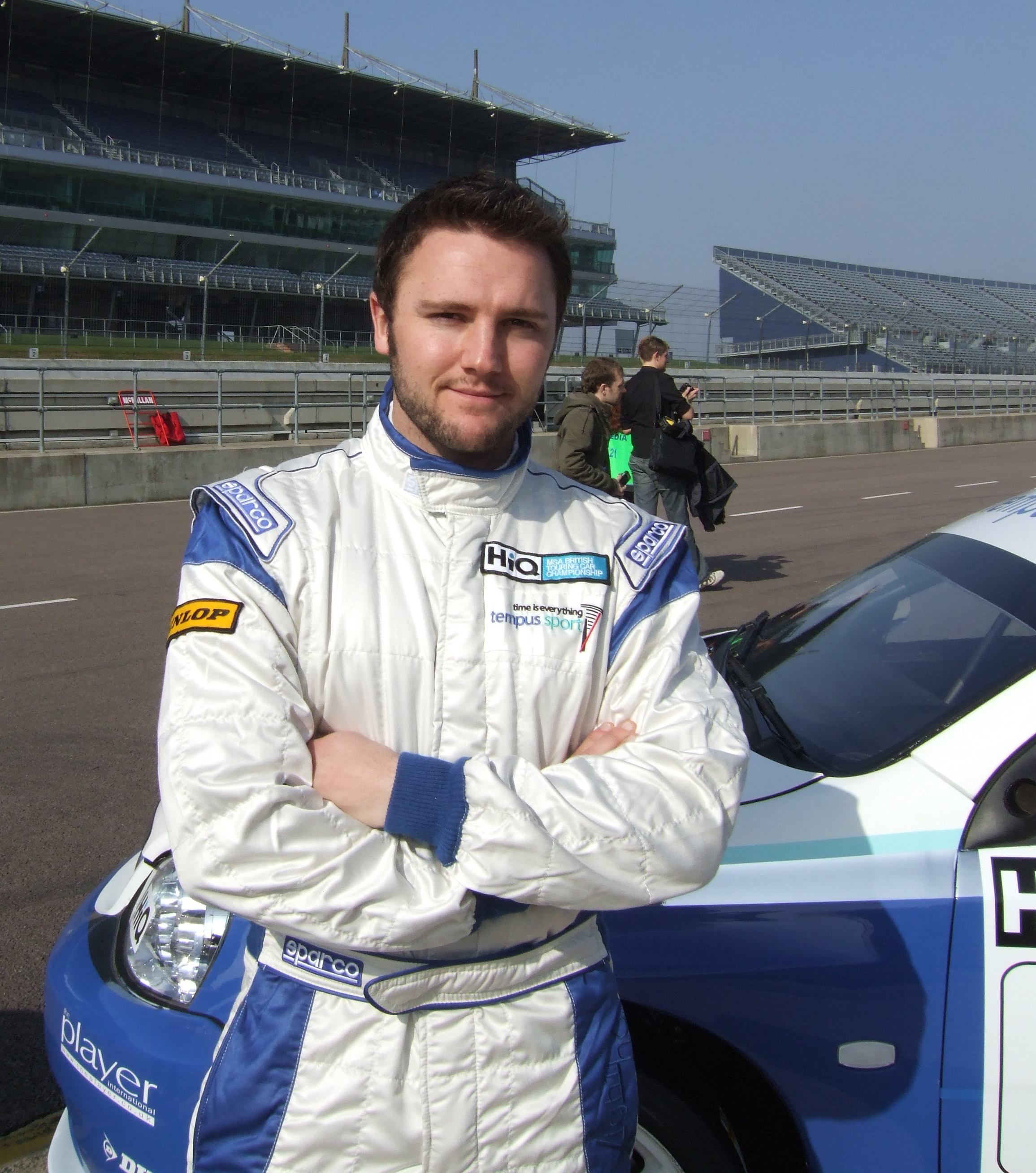
- Vaulkhard at Rockingham Motor Speedway in 2009
- Nationality: (United Kingdom) British
- Born: 14 October 1985 (age 41) Newcastle-upon-Tyne, England

Previous series
- 2010 2008–2009 2007 2005–07: WTCC; BTCC; Renault Clio Cup Great Britain Winter Series; SEAT Cupra Championship

Championship titles
- 2007 2013 2014 2021: SEAT Cupra R Class; Golf GTi Championship; Volkswagen Cup; BTRDA British Rallycross Production Class

Harry Vaulkhard (born 14 October 1985) is a British racing driver who most notably competed in the British Touring Car Championship in 2008 and 2009, racing with Robertshaw Racing, Tempus Sport and Bamboo Engineering.

== Career ==
=== Early career ===
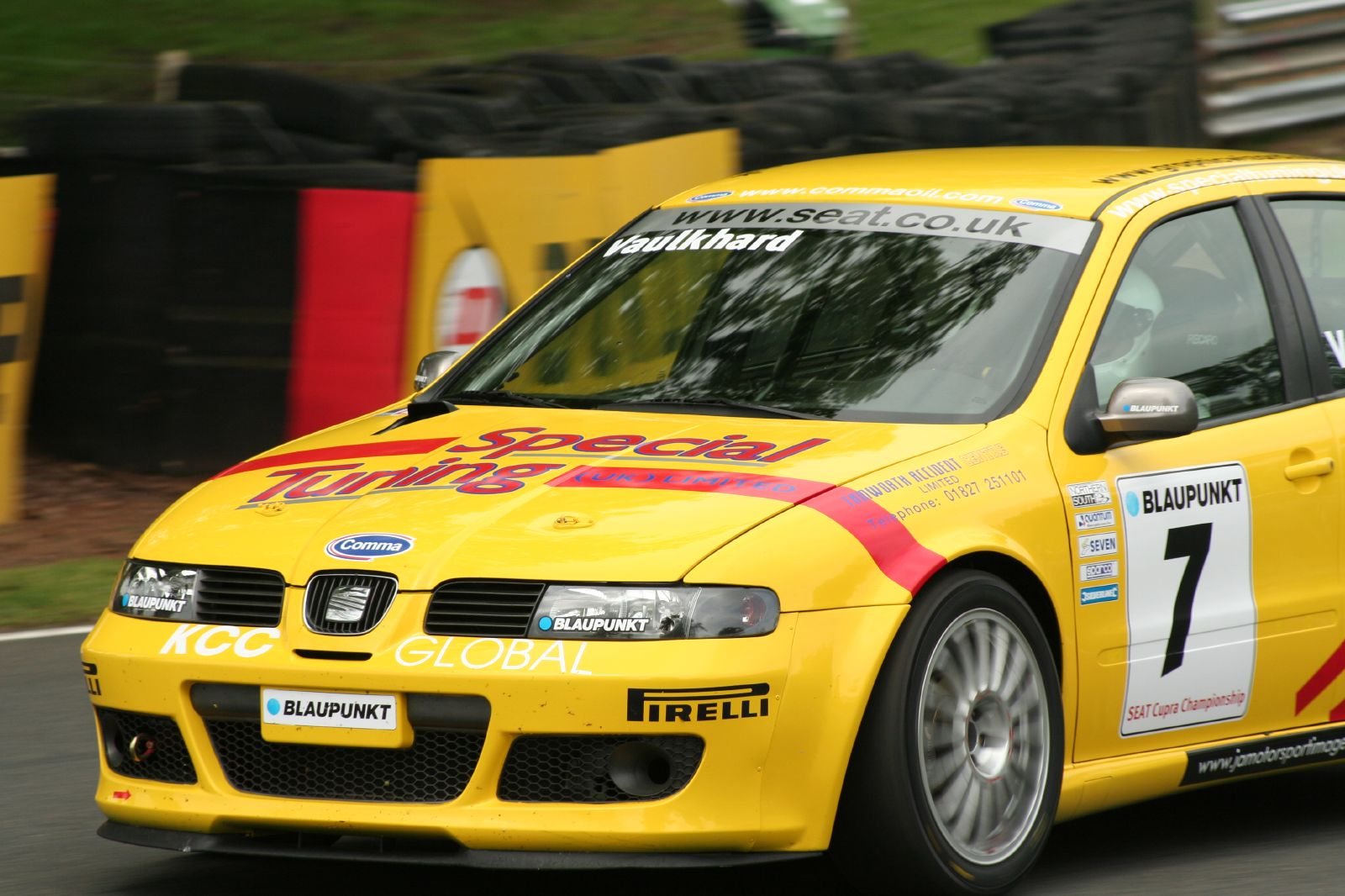
Vaulkhard driving at the Oulton Park round of the 2006 SEAT Cupra Championship.

Vaulkhard's father, Nigel Vaulkhard, was a successful businessman in the Tyneside area, owning and operating a number of bars, and was also a keen classic touring car racer. Vaulkhard is a former motocross competitor, who began circuit racing in cars in 2004, by racing in the Northern Sports & Saloon Championship. For 2005, he switched to the SEAT Cupra Championship, with JS Motorsport. In 2006, he finished ninth overall, for the 2005 series winners Triple-R.

Vaulkhard went on to win the British SEAT Cupra R Championship in 2007 winning a test drive with the works SEAT BTCC squad and £100,000 prize fund, to this date the largest prize money in British Motorsport.

=== British Touring Car Championship ===
Vaulkhard's graduation to the British Touring Car Championship for 2008 with Robertshaw Racing was confirmed in December 2007. His team-mates in the expanded team were the more experienced Matt Allison in another Lacetti, and Alan Taylor in a Honda Integra. Vaulkhard qualified tenth at Donington Park but scored no points.

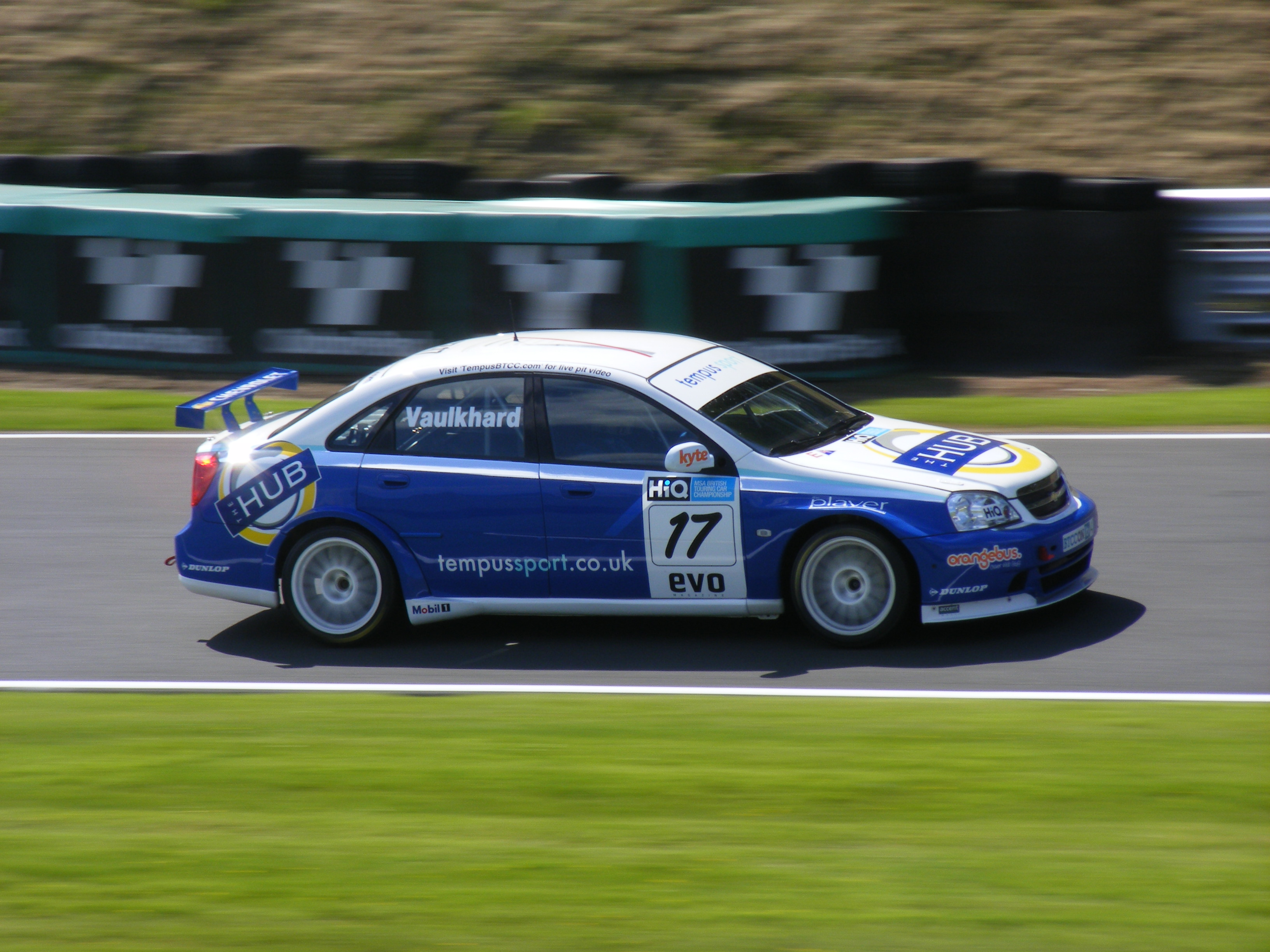
Vaulkhard driving the Tempus Sport Chevrolet Lacetti at Oulton Park during the 2009 British Touring Car Championship season.

The Robertshaw team did not run them in 2009.

Vaulkhard qualified ahead of the works Chevrolet drivers at many rounds, but fifth was his best overall finish despite a few front row starts.

Vaulkhard went on to compete in the European Touring Car Championship in 2009, where he was leading the series until three laps from the end of the last race in Braga, Portugal, when he left the circuit, resulting in a final finishing position of fourth in the series.

=== World Touring Car Championship ===
Bamboo and Vaulkhard moved to the World Touring Car Championship in 2010, with Darryl O'Young as teammate. At the third round in Monza he scored his and the team's first victory in the Independents' Trophy, as well as a main championship point for tenth overall. After the seventh round of the season while leading the Independents championship, he was forced to call time on his 2010 campaign due to a lack of funding. He would continue to attend WTCC events with the squad and was hopeful of finding the backing to return to racing for the final two rounds at Okayama and Macau.

=== Other series ===
In 2012, Vaulkhard competed in four races in the 2012 Racecar Euro Series, driving a Chevrolet Impala for Team FJ. He also competed in four races in the Golf GTi Championship that year, scoring three podium finishes. In 2013, he went on to become the Touch of Mojo Golf GTi Champion. In 2014, he signed with Team HARD to race in the VW Cup under the PPCGB.com Racing banner. However this never came to fruition, he went on to win a third British title in the Volkswagen cup driving for Team Slide Sports. He also raced in the Suzuki Swift Sport Championship at the 2014 British Rallycross Championship final meeting at Croft.

Since 2011, Vaulkhard has commentated on the World Touring Car Championship for Eurosport.

Since 2020, Vaulkhard has competed within the British rallycross championships. He went on to win the Production 16V Championship in 2021 after a season of competing in the north east autocross championship which is run by Cramlington and District Motor Club.

== Racing record ==
=== Career summary ===
Season	Series	Team name	Races	Poles	Wins	Points	Final Placing
2005	SEAT Cupra Championship Great Britain	J.S. Motorsport	17	0	0	42	11th
2006	SEAT Cupra Championship Great Britain	42nd Street Realty/Triple R	18	0	0	69	9th
2007	SEAT Cupra Championship Great Britain	Triple R (R-Class)	20	1	4	267	**1st**
2007	Renault Clio Cup Great Britain Winter Series	Robertshaw Racing	4	3	0	41	11th
2008	British Touring Car Championship	Robertshaw Racing	30	0	0	2	19th
2009	British Touring Car Championship	Tempus Sport/Bamboo Engineering	30	0	0	22	16th
2010	World Touring Car Championship	Bamboo Engineering	14	0	0	1	21st

=== Complete British Touring Car Championship results ===
(key) (Races in bold indicate pole position – 1 point awarded in first race) (Races in italics indicate fastest lap – 1 point awarded all races) (* signifies that driver lead race for at least one lap – 1 point awarded all races)

Year	Team	Car	1	2	3	4	5	6	7	8	9	10	11	12	13	14	15	16	17	18	19	20	21	22	23	24	25	26	27	28	29	30	DC	Pts
2008	Robertshaw Racing	Chevrolet Lacetti	BRH; 1; 18	BRH; 2; 15	BRH; 3; 14	ROC; 1 Ret	ROC; 2; 13	ROC; 3; 14	DON; 1; 12	DON; 2; 14	DON; 3; 11	THR; 1 Ret	THR; 2; 16	THR; 3; 10	CRO; 1; 13	CRO; 2; 13	CRO; 3; 11	SNE; 1; 14	SNE; 2; 17	SNE; 3; 15	OUL; 1; 14	OUL; 2; 12	OUL; 3; 12	KNO; 1 Ret	KNO; 2; 16	KNO; 3; 14	SIL; 1; 10	SIL; 2; 12	SIL; 3; 13	BRH; 1; 16	BRH; 2; 13	BRH; 3; 14	19th	2
2009	Tempus Sport	Chevrolet Lacetti	BRH; 1; 8	BRH; 2; 11	BRH; 3; 9	THR; 1; 9	THR; 2; 12	THR; 3; 11	DON; 1; 5	DON; 2; 10	**DON**; **3**; 7	OUL; 1 Ret	OUL; 2; 15	OUL; 3; 12	CRO; 1 Ret	CRO; 2 DNS	CRO; 3 DNS																16th	22
2009	Bamboo Engineering	Chevrolet Lacetti																SNE; 1; 10	SNE; 2; 9	**SNE**; **3** Ret	KNO; 1; 10	KNO; 2 Ret	KNO; 3; 11	SIL; 1; 14	SIL; 2; 11	SIL; 3; 11	ROC; 1; 13	ROC; 2; 11	ROC; 3 Ret	BRH; 1; 11	BRH; 2; 13	BRH; 3 Ret	16th	22

=== Complete World Touring Car Championship results ===
(key) (Races in bold indicate pole position) (Races in italics indicate fastest lap)

Year	Team	Car	1	2	3	4	5	6	7	8	9	10	11	12	13	14	15	16	17	18	19	20	21	22	DC	Pts
2010	Bamboo Engineering	Chevrolet Lacetti	BRA; 1; 16	BRA; 2; 13	MAR; 1; 16	MAR; 2 Ret	ITA; 1; 10	ITA; 2; 13	BEL; 1; 15	BEL; 2 Ret	POR; 1; 15	POR; 2; 11	GBR; 1; 17	GBR; 2; 14	CZE; 1; 15	CZE; 2; 15	GER; 1	GER; 2	ESP; 1	ESP; 2	JPN; 1	JPN; 2	MAC; 1	MAC; 2	21st	1
