= Tempus Sport =

(United Kingdom) Tempus Sport
- Founded: 2008
- Folded: 2009
- Former series: British Formula Renault Championship

Tempus Sport are a former British motor sport team based in Milton Keynes. The team was set up in 2008, with a view to first start racing in 2009. Some of the personnel are former employees of experienced team RML, including team director Richard Coleman.

== Racing series ==
=== BTCC ===
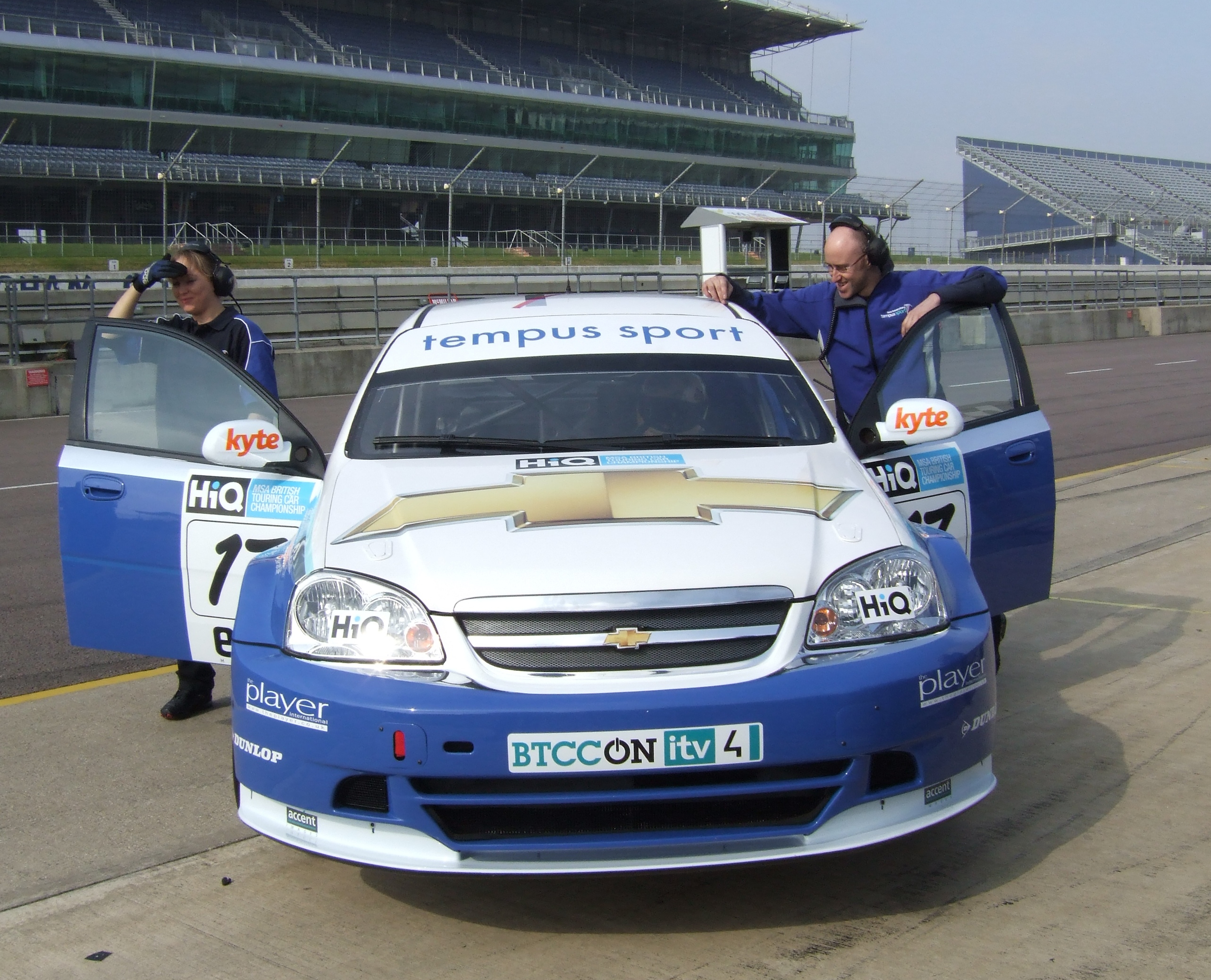
2009 livery for Harry Vaulkhard's Lacetti, ready for testing at Rockingham.

In 2009, the team planned to enter two 2008 specification Chevrolet Lacettis in the British Touring Car Championship. They had support throughout the season from RML who ran the works Chevrolet team in the World Touring Car Championship. Harry Vaulkhard, who drove a Lacetti in the BTCC in 2008 for Robertshaw Racing, drove one of the cars. They could not secure a funded driver for the second car, and it was used as a spare shell when Vaulkhard had an accident at Croft, rendering his original car unrepairable.

=== Formula Renault ===
In 2009 Tempus Sport entered cars in the British Formula Renault Championship, which is part of the TOCA tour. This side of operations were overseen by former champion Neil Riddiford. Two cars were entered for Ukrainian Max Dmytrenko and Croatian Sasha Radola.

== Team split ==
In July 2009, the team split. Coleman formed Bamboo Engineering, and Vaulkhard drove the same 2008-specification Lacetti as he had done throughout the season up to the split. Everyone who had worked on his car to that point moved across to Bamboo.
