= 2010 FIA WTCC Race of Brazil =

Touring car race in Curitiba

Race details
- Round 1 of 11 in the 2010 World Touring Car Championship at Autódromo Internacional de Curitiba in Curitiba, Brazil.
- Date: 7 March, 2010
- Location: Curitiba, Brazil
- Course: Autódromo Internacional de Curitiba; 3.695 kilometres (2.296 mi)

Race One
- Laps: 16
Pole position
Driver		(France) Yvan Muller	Chevrolet RML
Time		1:23.725	
Podium
First		(France) Yvan Muller	Chevrolet RML
Second		(United Kingdom) Robert Huff	Chevrolet RML
Third		(Switzerland) Alain Menu	Chevrolet RML
Fastest Lap
Driver		(United Kingdom) Robert Huff	Chevrolet RML
Time		1:33.904	

Race Two
- Laps: 14
Podium
First		(Italy) Gabriele Tarquini	SR-Sport
Second		(Spain) Jordi Gené	SR-Sport
Third		(Switzerland) Alain Menu	Chevrolet RML
Fastest Lap
Driver		(Italy) Gabriele Tarquini	SR-Sport
Time		1:25.803	

The 2010 FIA WTCC Race of Brazil (formally the 2010 FIA WTCC HSBC Race of Brazil) was a World Touring Car Championship round held at Autódromo Internacional de Curitiba near Curitiba, Brazil on 7 March 2010. It was the opening round of the 2010 World Touring Car Championship season and the fifth running of the FIA WTCC Race of Brazil. The two races were won by Yvan Muller of Chevrolet and Gabriele Tarquini of SR-Sport

== Background ==
Reigning manufacturer's champion SEAT withdrew from the series for the 2010 season. Former SEAT Sport drivers Gabriele Tarquini, Tiago Monteiro and Jordi Gené transferred to new team SR-Sport, run by SUNRED Engineering. BMW reduced their team from five cars to two, with Augusto Farfus joining Andy Priaulx at BMW Team RBM. Chevrolet continue to run three cars, with Yvan Muller replacing Nicola Larini in their line-up. Lada were absent from the opening round of the season. Fredy Barth made his WTCC debut for SUNRED, while Harry Vaulkhard and Darryl O'Young made their first appearances with new team bamboo-engineering.

This was also the first round for the new points system introduced in Formula One. The winning driver would score 25 points, with points going down to tenth place. Points would therefore be awarded 25–18–15–12–10–8–6–4–2–1.

== Report ==
=== Testing and free practice ===
BMW Team RBM driver Farfus was fastest in Friday's test session with Chevrolet driver Alain Menu second and Farfus' teammate Priaulx third. Tarquini was the fastest SR–Sport driver in sixth, his teammate Jordi Gené stopped early on with steering problems.

BMW stayed on top in free practice one on Saturday morning, with 1–2 with Farfus first and Priaulx second. Huff was the fastest Chevrolet while newcomer and privateer Norbert Michelisz was the lead SEAT. The session was stopped early when Vaulkhard brought out the red flags with three minutes remaining.

SR–Sport and Tarquini was quickest in free practice two, less than five hundredths of a second ahead of Farfus. Priaulx was third and Muller was fourth in the fastest of the Chevrolets. The leading independent was Franz Engstler while Vaulkhard took to the track near the end of the session after repairs to his car following his practice one crash.

=== Qualifying ===
Chevrolet dominated the first qualifying session of the season. Rob Huff was fastest in Q1 ahead of teammates Alain Menu and Yvan Muller.

Muller set the fastest time in Q2, clinching pole position, while Menu and Huff were third and fourth. SR-Sport's Jordi Gené separated the Chevrolet's by setting the second fastest time. Gabriele Tarquini was fifth, ahead of the BMW's of Andy Priaulx and Augusto Farfus, which had set the pace in the testing and practice sessions earlier in the weekend.

=== Warm-Up ===
After rain fell overnight, the Sunday morning warm–up session took place on a drying track. Priaulx was fastest while pole sitter Muller was fourth. The session was cut short when Tom Coronel went off the track with two minutes remaining.

=== Race One ===
A torrential downpour shortly before the start of the race led to the first two laps of the race being run behind the safety car. As Muller led the field through the opening corners after they were released, Gené ran wide and lost places to Huff and Menu, before running wide again and dropping to tenth.

Muller led his teammates home for a Chevrolet 1-2-3 on his debut for the team. Reigning champion Tarquini finished fourth, ahead of Andy Priaulx. Augusto Farfus finished sixth after a battle with Tom Coronel that saw the Dutchman drop to eighth behind a recovering Gené. Fredy Barth finished ninth on his world championship debut, after passing Norbert Michelisz on the penultimate lap. Sergio Hernández was top Independent in 13th overall, after starting at the back of the field. He took advantage of contact between class leaders Stefano D'Aste and Darryl O'Young to win.

=== Race Two ===
Tarquini led an SR–Sport 1–2 ahead of Gené. Tarquini had fought off an attack from Priaulx at the first corner, causing the BMW driver to head to the pits for repairs. Gené led the race until lap three until he was passed by Tarquini and the two distanced from the Chevrolet trio of Huff, Menu and Muller. Huff then ran wide and got back on track ahead of Farfus, Huff defended to stay ahead until the finish. Hernández was the winning independent while Priaulx and Coronel were the only two retirements, pole sitter Coronel having retired after contact with Huff on the first lap.

== Results ==
=== Qualifying ===
Pos.	No.	Name	Team	Car	C	Q1	Q2
1	6	(France) Yvan Muller	Chevrolet RML	Chevrolet Cruze LT		1:23.923	1:23.725
2	4	(Spain) Jordi Gené	SR-Sport	SEAT León 2.0 TDI		1:24.157	1:23.757
3	8	(Switzerland) Alain Menu	Chevrolet RML	Chevrolet Cruze LT		1:23.730	1:23.829
4	7	(United Kingdom) Robert Huff	Chevrolet RML	Chevrolet Cruze LT		1:23.630	1:23.833
5	1	(Italy) Gabriele Tarquini	SR-Sport	SEAT León 2.0 TDI		1:24.125	1:23.834
6	11	(United Kingdom) Andy Priaulx	BMW Team RBM	BMW 320si		1:24.034	1:23.955
7	10	(Brazil) Augusto Farfus	BMW Team RBM	BMW 320si		1:24.006	1:23.981
8	17	(Denmark) Michel Nykjær	SUNRED Engineering	SEAT León 2.0 TDI		1:24.516	1:24.161
9	2	(Netherlands) Tom Coronel	SR-Sport	SEAT León 2.0 TDI		1:24.558	1:24.325
10	5	(Hungary) Norbert Michelisz	Zengő-Dension Team	SEAT León 2.0 TDI		1:24.019	1:24.926
11	3	(Portugal) Tiago Monteiro	SR-Sport	SEAT León 2.0 TDI		1:24.562	
12	18	(Switzerland) Fredy Barth	SEAT Swiss Racing by SUNRED	SEAT León 2.0 TDI		1:24.983	
13	26	(Italy) Stefano D'Aste	Scuderia Proteam Motorsport	BMW 320si	Y	1:25.153	
14	20	(Hong Kong) Darryl O'Young	bamboo-engineering	Chevrolet Lacetti	Y	1:25.328	
15	21	(Morocco) Mehdi Bennani	Wiechers-Sport	BMW 320si	Y	1:25.486	
16	15	(Germany) Franz Engstler	Liqui Moly Team Engstler	BMW 320si	Y	1:25.547	
17	25	(Spain) Sergio Hernández	Scuderia Proteam Motorsport	BMW 320si	Y	1:25.826	
18	19	(United Kingdom) Harry Vaulkhard	bamboo-engineering	Chevrolet Lacetti	Y	1:25.841	
19	16	(Russia) Andrei Romanov	Liqui Moly Team Engstler	BMW 320si	Y	1:27.567	

=== Race 1 ===
Pos.	No.	Name	Team	Car	C	Laps	Time/Retired	Grid	Points
1	6	(France) Yvan Muller	Chevrolet RML	Chevrolet Cruze LT		16	26:57.181	1	25
2	7	(United Kingdom) **Robert Huff**	Chevrolet RML	Chevrolet Cruze LT		16	+1.053	4	18
3	8	(Switzerland) Alain Menu	Chevrolet RML	Chevrolet Cruze LT		16	+5.582	3	15
4	1	(Italy) Gabriele Tarquini	SR-Sport	SEAT León 2.0 TDI		16	+7.136	5	12
5	11	(United Kingdom) Andy Priaulx	BMW Team RBM	BMW 320si		16	+11.625	6	10
6	10	(Brazil) Augusto Farfus	BMW Team RBM	BMW 320si		16	+12.098	7	8
7	4	(Spain) Jordi Gené	SR-Sport	SEAT León 2.0 TDI		16	+14.379	2	6
8	2	(Netherlands) Tom Coronel	SR-Sport	SEAT León 2.0 TDI		16	+14.647	9	4
9	18	(Switzerland) Fredy Barth	SEAT Swiss Racing by SUNRED	SEAT León 2.0 TDI		16	+18.773	12	2
10	5	(Hungary) Norbert Michelisz	Zengő-Dension Team	SEAT León 2.0 TDI		16	+20.359	10	1
11	3	(Portugal) Tiago Monteiro	SR-Sport	SEAT León 2.0 TDI		16	+21.691	11	
12	17	(Denmark) Michel Nykjær	SUNRED Engineering	SEAT León 2.0 TDI		16	+22.645	8	
13	25	(Spain) Sergio Hernández	Scuderia Proteam Motorsport	BMW 320si	Y	16	+34.973	19	
14	15	(Germany) Franz Engstler	Liqui Moly Team Engstler	BMW 320si	Y	16	+38.092	16	
15	20	(Hong Kong) Darryl O'Young	bamboo-engineering	Chevrolet Lacetti	Y	16	+44.692	14	
16	19	(United Kingdom) Harry Vaulkhard	bamboo-engineering	Chevrolet Lacetti	Y	16	+50.005	17	
17	26	(Italy) Stefano D'Aste	Scuderia Proteam Motorsport	BMW 320si	Y	16	+50.742	13	
18	21	(Morocco) Mehdi Bennani	Wiechers-Sport	BMW 320si	Y	16	+1:20.825	15	
Ret	16	(Russia) Andrei Romanov	Liqui Moly Team Engstler	BMW 320si	Y	5	Race incident	18	

- **Bold** denotes Fastest lap.

=== Race 2 ===
Pos.	No.	Name	Team	Car	C	Laps	Time/Retired	Grid	Points
1	1	(Italy) **Gabriele Tarquini**	SR-Sport	SEAT León 2.0 TDI		14	20:13.311	5	25
2	4	(Spain) Jordi Gené	SR-Sport	SEAT León 2.0 TDI		14	+1.276	2	18
3	8	(Switzerland) Alain Menu	Chevrolet RML	Chevrolet Cruze LT		14	+5.407	6	15
4	6	(France) Yvan Muller	Chevrolet RML	Chevrolet Cruze LT		14	+5.985	8	12
5	7	(United Kingdom) Robert Huff	Chevrolet RML	Chevrolet Cruze LT		14	+8.295	7	10
6	10	(Brazil) Augusto Farfus	BMW Team RBM	BMW 320si		14	+8.596	3	8
7	3	(Portugal) Tiago Monteiro	SR-Sport	SEAT León 2.0 TDI		14	+10.419	11	6
8	17	(Denmark) Michel Nykjær	SUNRED Engineering	SEAT León 2.0 TDI		14	+11.808	12	4
9	5	(Hungary) Norbert Michelisz	Zengő-Dension Team	SEAT León 2.0 TDI		14	+17.576	10	2
10	25	(Spain) Sergio Hernández	Scuderia Proteam Motorsport	BMW 320si	Y	14	+24.244	13	1
11	15	(Germany) Franz Engstler	Liqui Moly Team Engstler	BMW 320si	Y	14	+24.643	14	
12	21	(Morocco) Mehdi Bennani	Wiechers-Sport	BMW 320si	Y	14	+30.072	18	
13	19	(United Kingdom) Harry Vaulkhard	bamboo-engineering	Chevrolet Lacetti	Y	14	+30.923	16	
14	26	(Italy) Stefano D'Aste	Scuderia Proteam Motorsport	BMW 320si	Y	14	+40.328	17	
15	20	(Hong Kong) Darryl O'Young	bamboo-engineering	Chevrolet Lacetti	Y	14	+40.481	15	
16	18	(Switzerland) Fredy Barth	SEAT Swiss Racing by SUNRED	SEAT León 2.0 TDI		14	+1:09.780	9	
Ret	2	(Netherlands) Tom Coronel	SR-Sport	SEAT León 2.0 TDI		1	Race incident	1	
Ret	11	(United Kingdom) Andy Priaulx	BMW Team RBM	BMW 320si		0	Race incident	4	
DNS	16	(Russia) Andrei Romanov	Liqui Moly Team Engstler	BMW 320si	Y	0	Did not start	19	

- **Bold** denotes Fastest lap.

== Standings after the event ==
Drivers' Championship standings

Pos	Driver	Points
1	(France) Yvan Muller	37
2	(Italy) Gabriele Tarquini	37
3	(Switzerland) Alain Menu	30
4	(United Kingdom) Robert Huff	28
5	(Spain) Jordi Gené	24

Yokohama Independents' Trophy standings

Pos	Driver	Points
1	(Spain) Sergio Hernández	23
2	(Germany) Franz Engstler	16
3	(United Kingdom) Harry Vaulkhard	10
4	(Morocco) Mehdi Bennani	9
5	(Hong Kong) Darryl O'Young	9

Manufacturers' Championship standings

Pos	Manufacturer	Points
1	(United States) Chevrolet	70
2	(Spain) SEAT Customers Technology	66
3	(Germany) BMW	40

- Note: Only the top five positions are included for both sets of drivers' standings.
