= 2010 FIA WTCC Race of Portugal =

Sports race

Race details
- Round 5 of 11 in the 2010 World Touring Car Championship at Autódromo Internacional do Algarve in Portimão, Portugal.
- Date: 4 July, 2010
- Location: Portimão, Portugal
- Course: Autódromo Internacional do Algarve; 4.654 kilometres (2.892 mi)

Race One
- Laps: 11
Pole position
Driver		(Portugal) Tiago Monteiro	SR-Sport
Time		1:55.372	
Podium
First		(Portugal) Tiago Monteiro	SR-Sport
Second		(France) Yvan Muller	Chevrolet RML
Third		(Italy) Gabriele Tarquini	SR-Sport
Fastest Lap
Driver		(Italy) Gabriele Tarquini	SR-Sport
Time		1:56.984	

Race Two
- Laps: 11
Podium
First		(Italy) Gabriele Tarquini	SR-Sport
Second		(France) Yvan Muller	Chevrolet RML
Third		(Switzerland) Alain Menu	Chevrolet RML
Fastest Lap
Driver		(Spain) Jordi Gené	SR-Sport
Time		1:57.902	

The 2010 FIA WTCC Race of Portugal was the fifth round of the 2010 World Touring Car Championship season. It was the fourth running of the Race of Portugal, and the first time the series had visited the circuit. The race was held at the Autódromo Internacional do Algarve near Portimão in Portugal on 4 July 2010. The two races were won by Tiago Monteiro and Gabriele Tarquini of SR-Sport.

== Background ==
Coming into the round, Chevrolet RML driver Yvan Muller was the leading the drivers' championship by 19 points. Sergio Hernández was leading the Yokohama Independents' Trophy by 16 points over Stefano D'Aste.

eBay Motors joined the grid with driver Colin Turkington for the first of three races, it marked Turkington's first race since he claimed the 2009 British Touring Car Championship drivers' title.

== Report ==
=== Testing and free practice ===
Andy Priaulx set the fastest time in Friday's test session, with Chevrolet driver Robert Huff less than a tenth behind. Augusto Farfus was third, in the second BMW Team RBM car.

SEAT driver Jordi Gené was fastest in the first practice session on Saturday morning, Muller was the fastest Chevrolet driver in fifth and Priaulx was the fastest BMW in seventh. Turkington was the top Yokohama Trophy driver in ninth.

Farfus was quickest in the final practice session ahead of the leading SR-Sport car of Tom Coronel. Fourth placed Huff was the fastest Chevrolet driver while Turkington in tenth was once again the fastest independent driver.

=== Qualifying ===
At the start of Q1, Tiago Monteiro and Priaulx collided at Turn 12, both cars having to return to the pits to repair the damage. Upon returning to the track, Monteiro set the fastest time in the session. Reigning British Touring Car Champion Colin Turkington made it through to Q2 as the quickest Independent runner on his season debut. SEAT drivers Michel Nykjær, Fredy Barth and Tom Coronel were the biggest names not to make it through to Q2, in 11th, 14th and 15th places.

In Q2, all ten of the drivers waited until there were four minutes remaining of the ten-minute session before setting their first flying lap times. Monteiro was fastest again, 0.053 seconds ahead of Muller, Farfus, Tarquini and Huff.

=== Warm-Up ===
Priaulx was fastest in the Sunday morning warm–up session while pole sitter Monteiro was sixth.

=== Race One ===
Monteiro led comfortably away from pole position in the opening laps, as Muller and Tarquini fought for second place behind him. Further back, Priaulx slid off the road at the final turn as he battled with Barth. Having suffered a puncture and damaged bodywork, Priaulx spent much of the race in the pits repairing the damage. As Nykjær and Norbert Michelisz were fighting over seventh place, they forced each other wide, allowing Alain Menu and Coronel to pass them. Huff had been running fourth early on having passed Farfus, but went off the road, running over the gravel trap and into the wall. He was able to rejoin, but finished the race a lap down in 18th place. Gené stopped out on track while running in sixth position. Having dropped back early on from his tenth-place starting position, Turkington was fighting with Barth behind, when the two made contact, putting Turkington into a spin, this gave Hernández the Independents' lead. As the race reached its conclusion, Monteiro came under pressure for the lead from Muller, Tarquini and Farfus. However he managed to keep them at bay to record a popular and emotional home victory. Having fended off Coronel, Menu finished fifth, with Michelisz and Barth finishing seventh and eighth. Hernández took the Independent victory ahead of Darryl O'Young in ninth overall.

=== Race Two ===
Barth made a slow start away from pole position at the start of race two, dropping to eighth by the end of the first lap. Fellow front-row-starter Michelisz took the lead from Barth. Behind, Menu passed Coronel for second place, while Tarquini moved into fourth before passing Coronel for third. Further back, Turkington fell to the back of the pack after a spin, while fellow Independent BMW driver Kristian Poulsen retired having had a spin of his own.

On the second lap, Barth lost five more places, while up front Menu began pushing Michelisz for the lead. Menu made his move at the beginning of lap four, with Tarquini also following him through before taking the lead from Menu. Michelisz meanwhile dropped out with a water pressure problem. Muller passed Coronel for third before passing his Chevrolet teammate Menu for second place.

On lap eight, Huff passed Monteiro and Coronel, before the BMW pair of Priaulx and Farfus also passed the two SEAT drivers. Two laps before the finish, Gené stopped once again due to a puncture. On the final lap, Huff passed Chevrolet teammate Menu for third position. Tarquini held on to take the victory ahead of Muller, Huff, Menu, Priaulx and Farfus. Coronel was seventh, ahead of Monteiro and Barth. O'Young took the final point in tenth and his first win in the Independents' Trophy. He had to hold off Turkington, who had recovered well from his early spin to pass Vaulkhard for 11th on the final lap.

After the race, Huff was given a 30-second penalty for an incident with Farfus, dropping him from third place to 15th. He was also given a reprimand for another incident with Farfus in the first race.

== Results ==
=== Qualifying ===
Pos.	No.	Name	Team	Car	C	Q1	Q2
1	3	(Portugal) Tiago Monteiro	SR-Sport	SEAT León 2.0 TDI		1:55.931	1:55.372
2	6	(France) Yvan Muller	Chevrolet RML	Chevrolet Cruze LT		1:56.112	1:55.425
3	10	(Brazil) Augusto Farfus	BMW Team RBM	BMW 320si		1:56.200	1:55.675
4	1	(Italy) Gabriele Tarquini	SR-Sport	SEAT León 2.0 TDI		1:56.097	1:55.709
5	7	(United Kingdom) Robert Huff	Chevrolet RML	Chevrolet Cruze LT		1:56.183	1:55.934
6	5	(Hungary) Norbert Michelisz	Zengő-Dension Team	SEAT León 2.0 TDI		1:56.479	1:55.991
7	4	(Spain) Jordi Gené	SR-Sport	SEAT León 2.0 TDI		1:56.302	1:56.104
8	11	(United Kingdom) Andy Priaulx	BMW Team RBM	BMW 320si		1:56.258	1:56.141
9	8	(Switzerland) Alain Menu	Chevrolet RML	Chevrolet Cruze LT		1:56.261	1:56.246
10	29	(United Kingdom) Colin Turkington	eBay Motors	BMW 320si	Y	1:56.513	1:56.696
11	17	(Denmark) Michel Nykjær	SUNRED Engineering	SEAT León 2.0 TDI		1:56.517	
12	20	(Hong Kong) Darryl O'Young	bamboo-engineering	Chevrolet Lacetti	Y	1:56.766	
13	18	(Switzerland) Fredy Barth	SEAT Swiss Racing by SUNRED	SEAT León 2.0 TDI		1:56.905	
14	2	(Netherlands) Tom Coronel	SR-Sport	SEAT León 2.0 TDI		1:56.946	
15	25	(Spain) Sergio Hernández	Scuderia Proteam Motorsport	BMW 320si	Y	1:57.502	
16	24	(Denmark) Kristian Poulsen	Poulsen Motorsport	BMW 320si	Y	1:57.578	
17	19	(United Kingdom) Harry Vaulkhard	bamboo-engineering	Chevrolet Lacetti	Y	1:57.628	
18	15	(Germany) Franz Engstler	Liqui Moly Team Engstler	BMW 320si	Y	1:57.803	
19	21	(Morocco) Mehdi Bennani	Wiechers-Sport	BMW 320si	Y	1:57.887	
20	26	(Italy) Stefano D'Aste	Scuderia Proteam Motorsport	BMW 320si	Y	1:58.008	
21	16	(Russia) Andrei Romanov	Liqui Moly Team Engstler	BMW 320si	Y	2:00.413	

=== Race 1 ===
Pos.	No.	Name	Team	Car	C	Laps	Time/Retired	Grid	Points
1	3	(Portugal) Tiago Monteiro	SR-Sport	SEAT León 2.0 TDI		11	21:38.194	1	25
2	6	(France) Yvan Muller	Chevrolet RML	Chevrolet Cruze LT		11	+1.032	2	18
3	1	(Italy) **Gabriele Tarquini**	SR-Sport	SEAT León 2.0 TDI		11	+1.587	4	15
4	10	(Brazil) Augusto Farfus	BMW Team RBM	BMW 320si		11	+1.826	3	12
5	8	(Switzerland) Alain Menu	Chevrolet RML	Chevrolet Cruze LT		11	+8.807	9	10
6	2	(Netherlands) Tom Coronel	SR-Sport	SEAT León 2.0 TDI		11	+11.723	14	8
7	5	(Hungary) Norbert Michelisz	Zengő-Dension Team	SEAT León 2.0 TDI		11	+12.562	6	6
8	18	(Switzerland) Fredy Barth	SEAT Swiss Racing by SUNRED	SEAT León 2.0 TDI		11	+20.173	13	4
9	25	(Spain) Sergio Hernández	Scuderia Proteam Motorsport	BMW 320si	Y	11	+23.113	15	2
10	20	(Hong Kong) Darryl O'Young	bamboo-engineering	Chevrolet Lacetti	Y	11	+23.245	12	1
11	24	(Denmark) Kristian Poulsen	Poulsen Motorsport	BMW 320si	Y	11	+23.642	16	
12	29	(United Kingdom) Colin Turkington	eBay Motors	BMW 320si	Y	11	+25.738	10	
13	15	(Germany) Franz Engstler	Liqui Moly Team Engstler	BMW 320si	Y	11	+26.845	18	
14	26	(Italy) Stefano D'Aste	Scuderia Proteam Motorsport	BMW 320si	Y	11	+27.248	20	
15	19	(United Kingdom) Harry Vaulkhard	bamboo-engineering	Chevrolet Lacetti	Y	11	+29.295	17	
16	16	(Russia) Andrei Romanov	Liqui Moly Team Engstler	BMW 320si	Y	11	+44.117	21	
17	17	(Denmark) Michel Nykjær	SUNRED Engineering	SEAT León 2.0 TDI		11	+49.343	11	
18	7	(United Kingdom) Robert Huff	Chevrolet RML	Chevrolet Cruze LT		10	+1 Lap	5	
Ret	4	(Spain) Jordi Gené	SR-Sport	SEAT León 2.0 TDI		7	Puncture	7	
Ret	21	(Morocco) Mehdi Bennani	Wiechers-Sport	BMW 320si	Y	4	Differential	19	
Ret	11	(United Kingdom) Andy Priaulx	BMW Team RBM	BMW 320si		3	Race incident	8	

- **Bold** denotes Fastest lap.

=== Race 2 ===
Pos.	No.	Name	Team	Car	C	Laps	Time/Retired	Grid	Points
1	1	(Italy) Gabriele Tarquini	SR-Sport	SEAT León 2.0 TDI		11	21:49.935	6	25
2	6	(France) Yvan Muller	Chevrolet RML	Chevrolet Cruze LT		11	+1.736	7	18
3	8	(Switzerland) Alain Menu	Chevrolet RML	Chevrolet Cruze LT		11	+3.244	4	15
4	11	(United Kingdom) Andy Priaulx	BMW Team RBM	BMW 320si		11	+3.570	19	12
5	10	(Brazil) Augusto Farfus	BMW Team RBM	BMW 320si		11	+4.094	5	10
6	2	(Netherlands) Tom Coronel	SR-Sport	SEAT León 2.0 TDI		11	+6.201	3	8
7	3	(Portugal) Tiago Monteiro	SR-Sport	SEAT León 2.0 TDI		11	+6.513	8	6
8	18	(Switzerland) Fredy Barth	SEAT Swiss Racing by SUNRED	SEAT León 2.0 TDI		11	+10.207	1	4
9	20	(Hong Kong) Darryl O'Young	bamboo-engineering	Chevrolet Lacetti	Y	11	+12.751	10	2
10	29	(United Kingdom) Colin Turkington	eBay Motors	BMW 320si	Y	11	+13.609	12	1
11	19	(United Kingdom) Harry Vaulkhard	bamboo-engineering	Chevrolet Lacetti	Y	11	+14.857	20	
12	21	(Morocco) Mehdi Bennani	Wiechers-Sport	BMW 320si	Y	11	+18.100	21	
13	26	(Italy) Stefano D'Aste	Scuderia Proteam Motorsport	BMW 320si	Y	11	+19.125	14	
14	15	(Germany) Franz Engstler	Liqui Moly Team Engstler	BMW 320si	Y	11	+21.271	13	
15^{1}	7	(United Kingdom) Robert Huff	Chevrolet RML	Chevrolet Cruze LT		11	+32.587	18	
16	16	(Russia) Andrei Romanov	Liqui Moly Team Engstler	BMW 320si	Y	11	+35.977	15	
17	25	(Spain) Sergio Hernández	Scuderia Proteam Motorsport	BMW 320si	Y	10	+1 Lap	9	
18	4	(Spain) **Jordi Gené**	SR-Sport	SEAT León 2.0 TDI		9	+2 Laps	17	
Ret	5	(Hungary) Norbert Michelisz	Zengő-Dension Team	SEAT León 2.0 TDI		5	Water pressure	2	
Ret	17	(Denmark) Michel Nykjær	SUNRED Engineering	SEAT León 2.0 TDI		3	Pierced radiator	16	
Ret	24	(Denmark) Kristian Poulsen	Poulsen Motorsport	BMW 320si	Y	1	Race incident	11	

- **Bold** denotes Fastest lap.

^1 — Huff originally finished third, but was given a 30-second penalty after the race for causing a collision.

== Standings after the event ==
Drivers' Championship standings

Pos	Driver	Points
1	(France) Yvan Muller	164
2	(Italy) Gabriele Tarquini	149
3	(United Kingdom) Andy Priaulx	117
4	(United Kingdom) Robert Huff	104
5	(Portugal) Tiago Monteiro	99

Yokohama Independents' Trophy standings

	Pos	Driver	Points
	1	(Spain) Sergio Hernández	73
4	2	(Hong Kong) Darryl O'Young	56
1	3	(Italy) Stefano D'Aste	51
1	4	(Morocco) Mehdi Bennani	46
	5	(United Kingdom) Harry Vaulkhard	45

Manufacturers' Championship standings

Pos	Manufacturer	Points
1	(United States) Chevrolet	317
2	(Spain) SEAT Customers Technology	312
3	(Germany) BMW	251

- Note: Only the top five positions are included for both sets of drivers' standings.
