= Craft-Bamboo Racing =

British auto racing team

(Hong Kong) Craft-Bamboo Racing
- Founded: 2009; 17 years ago
- Team principal(s): Frank Yu (Chairman); Darryl O'Young (Director)
- Current series: Intercontinental GT Challenge
- Former series: WTCC; TCR International Series; BTCC; GP3 Series; FIA World Endurance Championship; Asian Le Mans Series; GT World Challenge Asia
- Current drivers: (Germany) Maro Engel (Spain) Daniel Juncadella (Macau) Kevin Tse
- Teams' Championships: Asian Le Mans Series CN: 2014: 2016 TCR International Series: 2017 FRD LMP3 Series
- Drivers' Championships: Ind. WTCC: 2013: James Nash; Asian Le Mans Series CN: 2014: Kevin Tse; GT Asia Series: 2015: Darryl O'Young; 2017 Blancpain GT Series Asia GT4: 2017 Blancpain GT Series Asia: Frank Yu, Jean-Marc Merlin; 2017 FRD LMP3 Series: James Winslow
- Website: Official website

Craft-Bamboo Racing is an auto racing team. It was founded in 2014 after the merger of Craft Racing from Hong Kong and Bamboo Engineering from the United Kingdom.

Craft Racing was established by Frank Yu in 2009 and was a front running team in Asian Championships for five years.

Bamboo Engineering was formed in July 2009 in Silverstone following the departure of team director Richard Coleman from Tempus Sport. It finished third in the WTCC drivers championship in 2013, and also ran in the GP3 Series.

Richard Coleman was removed from the team in 2017, and was sued in 2020.

== British Touring Car Championship ==
Bamboo ran former Tempus driver Harry Vaulkhard in the 2009 British Touring Car Championship season, scoring several top 10 finishes to finish 16th overall in the championship.

== European Touring Car Cup ==
Bamboo entered a pair of Chevrolet Lacettis in the one off 2009 European Touring Car Cup as a prelude to the 2010 entry in Braga, Portugal. Vaulkhard entered alongside Duarte Fèlix da Costa.
In qualifying the pair locked out the second row of the grid with Costa 3rd and Vaulkhard 4th, eventually finishing race 1 8th & 5th respectively. In race 2 Vaulkhard led the race in what would have been a championship winning position before spinning out of contention and ending up crossing the line in 6th place. Da Costa inherited the lead which would have also sealed the title for him and also spun out, ultimately finishing 7th.

== World Touring Car Championship ==
=== Chevrolet Lacetti (2010–2011) ===
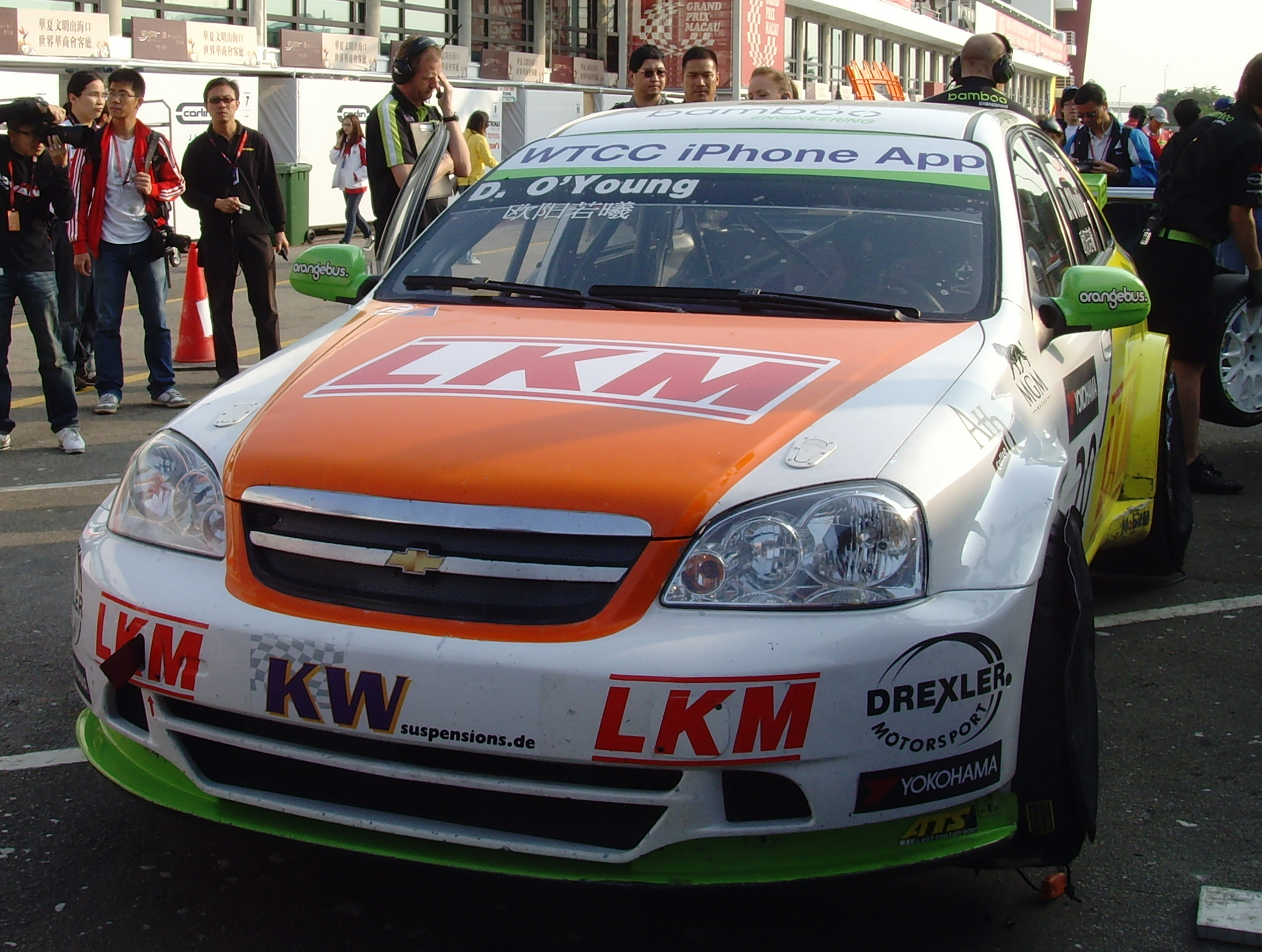
Title showdown. O'Young on the grid in Macau 2010.

In 2010 the team entered the World Touring Car Championship, initially with Vaulkhard and Darryl O'Young as drivers. Vaulkhard took the team's maiden WTCC Independents victory at the 2010 FIA WTCC Race of Italy. O'Young followed that up with the first ever victory for a Chinese driver in an FIA event at the 2010 FIA WTCC Race of Portugal; which he followed up with victories in Rounds 13 & 14 in Brno, earning the team's first pole position after finishing 8th in race 1 to secure reverse grid role for race 2. O'Young was later given a 30-second time penalty in race one, demoting him down the field and stripping him of his victory. Funding issues saw Vaulkard's season cut short and Yukinori Taniguchi stepped in to replace him for the latter part of the season. He claimed a class victory in the first race at his home event in Japan, and that success was quickly followed up with a victory for O'Young in the second. O'Young entered the final races in Macau as the only man with an outside chance of taking the title from Sergio Hernandez; after a crash with Tom Coronel in race 1 putting him both out of the race, Hernandez took the title and O'Young dropped to 4th in the standings. At the end of their debut season the team claimed second place in the Yokohama Teams' Trophy standings.

Bamboo retained O'Young and Taniguchi for the 2011 season, continuing with the Chevrolet Lacetti for the 2011 FIA WTCC Race of Brazil.

=== Chevrolet Cruze (2011–2013) ===
The team switched to the Chevrolet Cruze 1.6T for 2011 FIA WTCC Race of Belgium, replacing the Chevrolet Lacettis they ran in the opening round. O'Young took the Yokohama Drivers' Trophy victory in race two. That was to be the only independent victory for the team in 2011, the team ended the year fifth in the Yokohama Teams' Trophy standings.

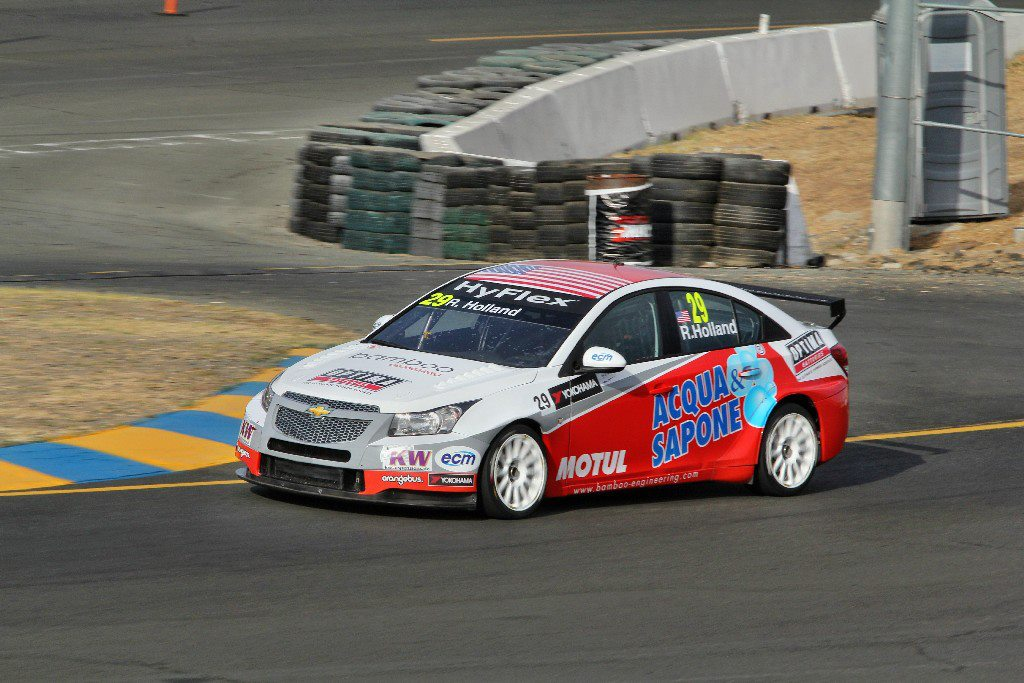
Holland on home turf in the 2012 WTCC Race of Sonoma

For 2012 the team had agreed a deal with RML Group which would see them run the same specification of car as the factory Chevrolet team. They signed former BTCC driver Alex MacDowall and Formula Renault 3.5 race winner Pasquale di Sabatino in an all–rookie lineup. The team left the opening round of the season at Monza with MacDowall tied at the top of the Independent Drivers' Trophy with Stefano D'Aste and Pepe Oriola. MacDowall was the fastest independent driver in qualifying for the Race of Austria and took his first WTCC independent victory in race one, the first of the season for Bamboo. For the Race of Brazil, di Sabatino was recovering from bronchitis and pneumonia was ruled out of competing by doctors with Michel Nykjær substituting for the Italian driver for the weekend. Nykjær took the independents' pole position and then the independents' win in race one by finishing in fifth place. The team signed Robb Holland to race their second car at the Race of the United States. O'Young returned to the team for the Race of Japan for the remainder of the season. MacDowall finished fifth in race one having started on the second row of the grid to take the independent drivers' victory. Both drivers were involved in a first lap pileup at the Race of China in race one with both drivers eventually retiring due to race incidents. The team went to the season finale in Macau with a slim chance for MacDowall to take the independent drivers' title. The weekend got off to a bad start when O'Young collided head on the barriers at the Mandarin Oriental corner in Thursday testing. O'Young took the independents' pole position in qualifying and then the independents' victory in race one after being the last car to escape the pileup at the Lisboa corner. MacDowall starting from pole position in race two was quickly passed by Norbert Michelisz at the start. He retook the leader later on but then the pair of them were passed by the works Chevrolet of Alain Menu. MacDowall's race ended when he was tapped from behind by Yvan Muller and collided head–on with the barriers on the exit of the high speed Mandarin bend. O'Young took his second independents' victory of the weekend.

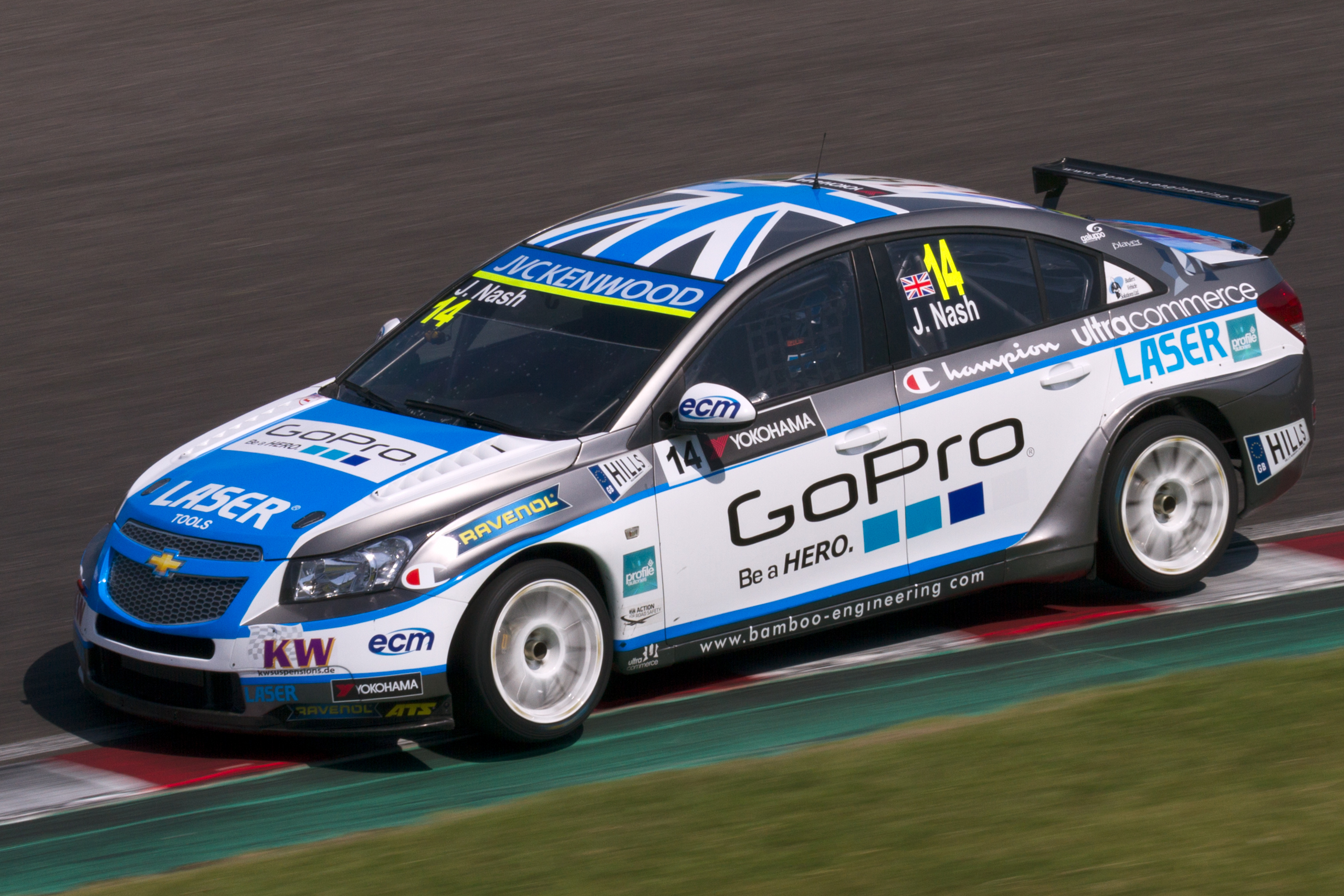
Nash during the 2013 Race of Japan

Bamboo engineering stayed in the WTCC for the 2013 season with James Nash joining from Team Aon. The team retained MacDowall in their second car. The team left the Race of Italy with MacDowall having claimed his first overall podium result and Nash leading the independent drivers' trophy, the team were second in the teams' trophy behind RML. Nash secured his first podium finish at the Race of Morocco in race one when he finished third. Nash took the independent driver's victory in race two, the two Bamboo drivers then shared the independent victories at the Race of Slovakia. Bamboo took their first overall victory in the WTCC at the Race of Austria when Nash held off the advances of Yvan Muller in the final laps of race two to finish on the top step of the podium having started from pole position. Nash followed this up with a second victory of the season in Race 2 in Portugal with a lights to flag victory from pole position 5 seconds ahead of reigning World Champion Rob Huff. MacDowall and Nash continued to trade independent class victories throughout the remainder of the season, with MacDowall victorious in the United States & Japan, where he also took an overall an podium for second, and Nash took both wins and an overall podium for 3rd in China. The pair went into the finale at Macau both with a chance of taking the independent crown. Nash sealed this in race one by following MacDowall home and then sealed 3rd in the World Championship with a 4th place whilst main rival Tom Chilton crashed out of both races. Nash & MacDowall shared 12 independent race wins between them in a dominant year for bamboo.

=== Chevrolet Cruze TC1 (2015) ===
After the sabbatical in 2014 whilst the squad competed in the World Endurance Championship, Bamboo returned to the World Touring Car Championship in 2015 continuing their relationship with RML and Chevrolet by competing with the Chevrolet Cruze in its new TC1 format. The team signed successful GT driver Gregoire Demoustier for the season which begun in promising fashion with the Frenchman scoring on his debut in Race 2 in Argentina with a 10th place. Another good result for Demoustier and a 10th place was secured in Race 2 at the Hungaroring. Following a major upgrade for the Slovakia round, Demoustier narrowly missed out on a reverse grid pole position at his home race in Paul Ricard, France by 0.015 seconds, after running in the top 6 in both free practice sessions. The Frenchman put on a similar competitive display in China running high up in the practice sessions and again just missing out on Q2.

== GP3 Series ==
In 2013, Bamboo joined the GP3 Series as the replacement for Atech CRS Grand Prix. After testing with the team at the Autódromo do Estoril, Venezuelan Roberto La Rocca became the first driver to join the team. Following the death of Venezuelan president Hugo Chávez and the changing political situation in the country, La Rocca was forced to exit the team and he was replaced by Carmen Jordá. The team signed British drivers Melville McKee and Lewis Williamson to drive their other two cars. McKee took his and the team's first victory in race 2 at the Nurburgring.
At the end of the season the team was sold to Russian Time.

== FIA World Endurance Championship ==
For 2014 Craft-Bamboo secured a technical partnership with Prodrive run Aston Martin Racing to run an Aston Martin Vantage V8 GTE car in the FIA WEC in the GTE Pro category. Alex MacDowall made the jump from the WTCC with the team as one of the drivers along with long term driver Darryl O'Young. The third seat was filled by Brazilian Fernando Rees, a previous champion in the series. Steady progress was made through the season with the #99 car battling for the class lead during the early hours for the 6 hours of Spa and the Lone Star Le Mans at Austin Texas. A crash in the first night session of the Le Mans 24 Hours with Rees behind the wheel left the Aston unrepairable, which unfortunately meant the team failed to take the start and compete in the flagship event for the series. The breakthrough came at the 6 hours of Fuji, with MacDowall and Rees qualifying the Vantage in pole position. After a tense 6 hour long battle during the race, the #99 ultimately missed out on the race win to the two Ferraris by 30 seconds — about the amount of time lost in the re-fuelling during the race. Competitive showings at the Chinese and Brazilian rounds showed the #99 had made progress and finished the season with a strong 4th place in the 6 Hours of São Paulo.

== TCR International Series ==
=== Seat Leon (2015-2017) ===
In 2015 Craft-Bamboo signed up for the brand new TCR International series, running TC3 specification Seat Leons in partnership with Lukoil. Former World Touring Car race winners Pepe Oriola and Jordi Gene were signed to compete for the season alongside Russian former F2 and GT racer Sergey Afanasyev. A fourth car was added for selected events for Hong Kong driver Frank Yu, who previously raced for Craft Bamboo in the GT Asia series. At the opening round supporting the Malaysian GP and the inaugural race of the championship, Oriola and Afanasyev fought up from qualifying 7th and 8th to finish 2nd and 3rd to secure a double podium. This was followed by a lights to flag victory for Gene in race 2, and Oriola marking another battling performance by finishing 2nd again. The first European round in Spain gave Gene & Oriola a chance to shine at their home race, Oriola delivered a stunning pole position lap and translated that into a light to flag victory in Race 1, followed home by Afanasyev and Gene to complete a Craft Bamboo 1-2-3. Gene secured another two podiums in Portugal for a 2nd place in race and snatched a 3rd place at the last corner of race 2 after a charge that saw him 8th with 4 laps remaining. Gene and Oriola took a 1-2 finish at Lukoils home race in Sochi to close the fight for the championship right up. Oriola further closed the gap following a double podium at the Red Bull Ring and a win and a third in Thailand, including the team's second 1-2-3 of the season, to just 2 points going into the Finale in Macau. Gene also remains in the title hunt at the last round after his third victory of the season in Singapore.

== GT Asia ==
=== Aston Martin Vantage GT3 (2014-2015) ===
As part of the link up with Craft Racing at the start of 2014, Craft Bamboo took over the entry of two GT3 Aston Martin Vantages in the GT Asia Championship, a highly regarded continental series where the team received technical back from Aston Martin Racing. The #97 car was driven all year by longtime Craft driver Frank Yu and was partnered by Australian V8 Supercar driver Warren Luff, Aston Martin Racing works driver Stefan Mucke and experienced GT racer Richard Lyons. The #99 car was shared through the season by several drivers with Jonathan Venter spending 3 weekends in the car.
After taking solid points in the opening round in Korea, the #97 driven by Lyons & Yu took pole position at the second race in Autopolis, Japan. They failed to take the win but still finished strongly in second place. The breakthrough win did come at round 7 in the team's home race in Malaysia with Mucke this time partnering Yu. The only win of the season. Solid results meant Yu was still in title contention heading into the final race at Macau but couldn't do enough to secure the title and ended up 7th in the standings. A DQ at round 4 in Autopolis and a DNF's at the following face at Fuji and another at round 9 in Malaysia ultimately costing him and the team. The team however did enough to finish second in the teams championship.
For 2015 Craft Bamboo announced the two Aston Martin Vantages would return for the season, both staffed with full-time drivers. Frank Yu would continue and partnered full-time with Richard Lyons, and in the #99 car Jonathon Venter secured a full-time drive with backing from Aston Martin and will partner former Manufacturer driver Darryl O'Young. The first round in Korea saw the #88 car of Lyons secure pole position and go on to take a third place. The spoils were shared out in the second race at O'Young and Venter in the #99 Aston Martin took an impressive race victory. During the summer Venter broke his leg in a cycling accident at home in Australia, and Brit Daniel Lloyd was drafted in to replace him in the #99 Aston. Lloyd took a podium on his opening weekend with O'Young in the 12 hours of Sepang race, and followed up with a double victory in Shanghai to allow the #99 car to take the championship lead with one event remaining. Lloyd took a stunning last gasp victory in Shanghai, after being 5th at the end of a safety car period with 3 laps remaining completed an overtaking move round the outside of turn 1 to take the lead on the final lap. Qualifying issues in Thailand saw O'Young & Lloyd in the #99 start well down the grid while their main competitors scored a solid result meaning #99 would go into the final race level on points with their Bentley rivals of Song/Sawa, but starting behind them in second on the grid. O'Young sealed the drivers title for craft bamboo racing however with a fine victory.

=== Porsche 991 GT3 R (2016) ===
Craft-Bamboo Racing announced on Early 2016 that they would partner with Porsche Motorsport. As Craft-Bamboo Racing has been appointed the Official Technical Partner for Porsche Motorsport in the Asia-Pacific region. With the vast global reach of the Porsche platform, it will provide a solid foundation for the team to continue expanding its sports car programs, which includes a two-car championship title defense with the all-new Porsche 911 GT3 R in the 2016 GT Asia Series. Apart from the GT Asia Series, the Hong Kong-based team will also compete with the 911 GT3 Rs in the FIA GT World Cup at the Macau Grand Prix, as well as the Sepang 12 Hour in December. 2017 will see the team return to the Mount Panorama in Australia, to tackle the Bathurst 12 Hours, where they will be looking to take the top step of the podium after scoring third place in 2015.

== GT World Challenge Asia ==
=== Porsche 991 GT3 R (2017-2018) ===
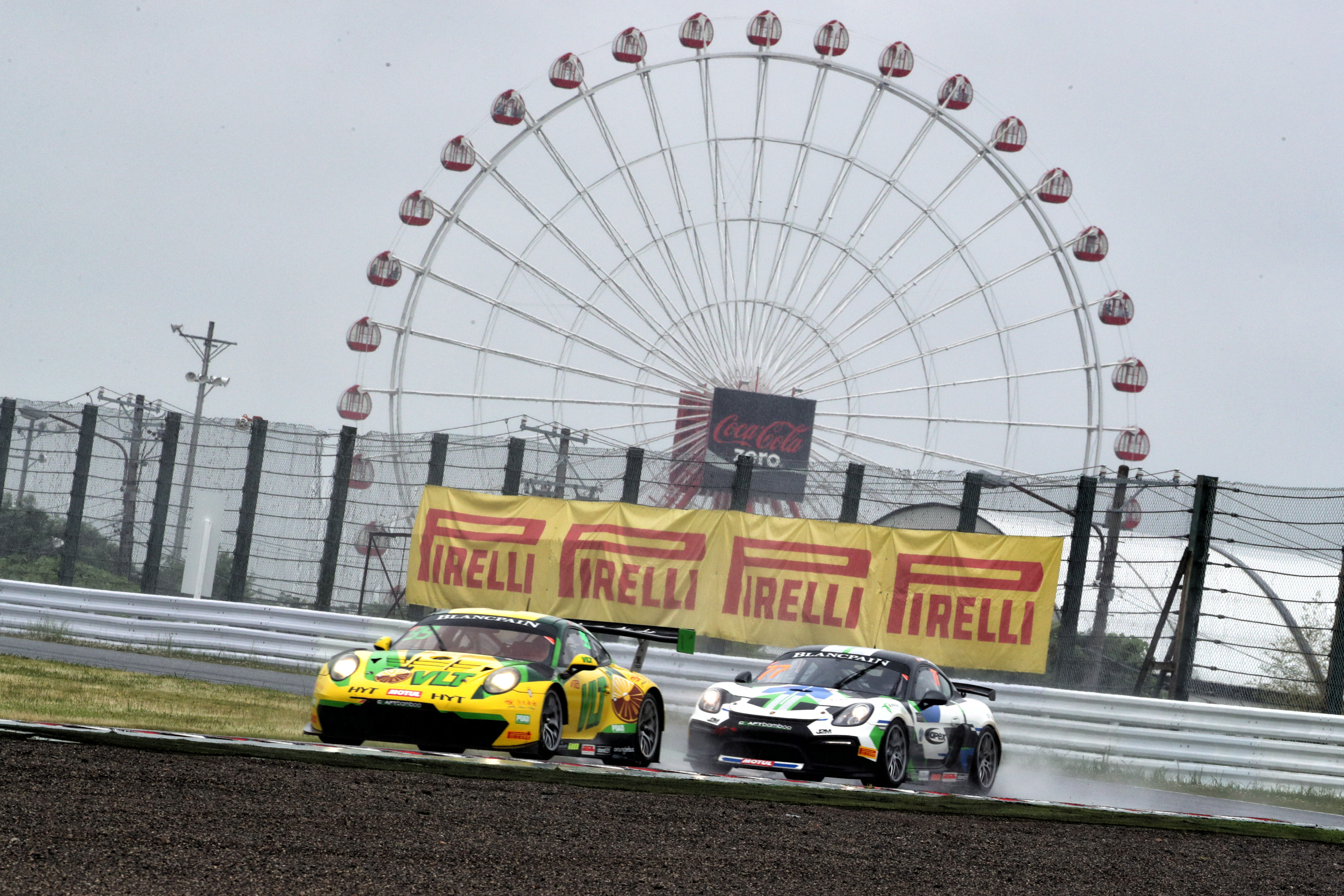
#99 & #77 at Suzuka in the Blancpain GT Asia

In its inaugural season of the Blancpain GT Series Asia, Craft-Bamboo entered a pair of Porsche 911 GT3 Rs and sole Cayman GT4 Clubsport MR; With Frank Yu and Jean Marc-Merlin driving the GT4, and Darryl O'Young and Peter Li Zhi Cong driving a VLT sponsored 911 GT3 R. The Team won the GT4 Class Championship, and fourth in the GT3 Championship. In the 2018 season, Craft-Bamboo entered pair of Porsche 911 GT3 Rs and a Cayman GT4 Clubsport MR.

=== Mercedes-AMG GT3 (2019-) ===
At the end of 2018, Craft-bamboo Racing announced that they will be switching to Mercedes-AMG as part of a new long-term partnership that will also see it compete in selected Intercontinental GT Challenge Powered by Pirelli rounds and the Macau FIA GT World Cup. Craft-Bamboo has confirmed that at least two Mercedes-AMG GT3 and a Mercedes-AMG GT4 will contest GT World Challenge Asia and GT4. With Craft-Bamboo Racing director Darryl O’Young believes the partnership will lift the team to new heights. For the 2019 season, Craft-Bamboo got fifth in the GT3 Team championship, and third in the GT3 Team championship.

== FIA GT World Cup ==
=== 2015 ===
It was announced at the end of 2015 that craft-bamboo would compete in the inaugural FIA GT World Cup with 3 Aston Martin Vantage GT3 cars as Aston Martins representative on the world stage. 2015 regulars Darryl O'Young and Richard Lyons were announced for the event in Macau, along with long time Aston Martin manufacturer driver Stefan Mucke. Mucke topped free practice two and qualifying to start the qualifying race in role position with O'Young 6th and Lyons, despite problems in free practice, starting 7th. Stefan Mucke won the qualifying race on the road but was handed a retrospective 10 second penalty for an infringement under the safety car which was triggered by Adderly Fong. In the main feature race Mucke had a race long battle with the Audis of multiple Macau Grand Prix winner Eduardo Mortara and teammate Rene Rast as well as the manufacturer Mercedes of Renger van der Zande. He eventually finished in 3rd place. O'Young finished in 5th place whilst Lyons crashed out on the opening lap.

=== 2016 ===
Darryl O'Young started from the back of the grid after missing out on yesterday's qualifying session due to an incident in FP2 that forced the crew to rebuild the car. The #99 driver capitalized on a good rolling start, passing several cars on the first lap before a safety car period from lap two to five. The #99 VLT Porsche driven by Darryl O’Young was carelessly struck by Edoardo Mortara on the final lap of the FIA GT World Cup qualification race after the Hong Kong driver had driven a flawless 12 lap stint. The unnecessary maneuver forced O’Young out of the race and cost Craft-Bamboo Racing a P13 start position for Sunday's main event. After the crew assessed the damage, which originally only looked superficial, the rear part of the chassis was found to be bent and unable to be repaired.

=== 2017 ===
Laurens Vanthoor was off to a start, moving up three places from his P9 starting position before Raffaele Marciello as they wove through the city streets. Marciello soon hit the brakes hard and dove to the right, narrowly avoiding a parked Daniel Juncadella. He is create one of the biggest GT pileups in recent history. The race was instantly red flagged and the cars were cleared away, but with the level of damage sustained to the #911 EVISU Porsche. Darryl O'Young #991 VLT Porsche a damaged radiator. The team did an exemplary job by repairing the VLT Porsche in time for the race restart under the safety car and O’Young got underway again from P5.

O’Young began the final race of the weekend from P6 under the safety car due to the wet conditions but was soon racing under a green flag from lap three. O’Young did well to defend his position from those behind, setting a good pace in the #991 VLT Porsche and using every inch of the circuit to keep his competitors at bay. The Hong Kong driver resisted the pressure and the many overtaking challenges that came with it over the coming laps, showing excellent defensive capabilities in the process before a safety car period began on lap six. When the race restarted on lap ten, O’Young instantly came under attack from Daniel Juncadella but the Macau expert firmly held his line into Lisboa and kept the Mercedes at bay. Unfortunately, the aggressive moves from behind continued as the Audi of Nico Muller charged up the rear of O’Young, hitting him from behind and spinning the #991 VLT Porsche into the barriers. Another safety car was called out in response and O’Young was able to get the Porsche back to the pits but the damage sustained was far too great to be repaired and he was forced to retire.

=== 2018 ===
Craft-Bamboo Racing entered the 2018 FIA GT World Cup with Mathieu Jaminet and Darryl O'Young.

=== 2019 ===
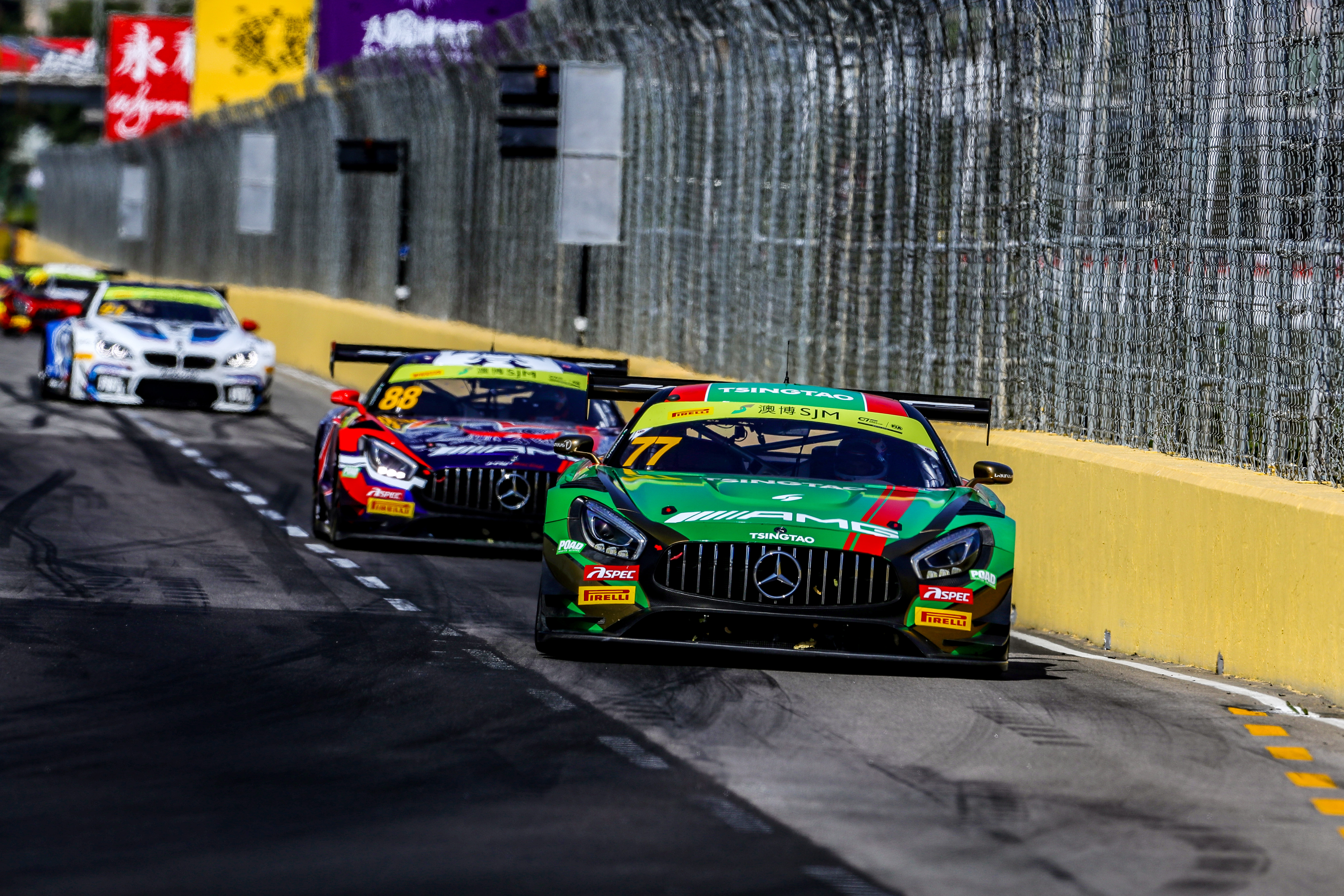
#77 & #88 at 2019 FIA GT World Cup.

Mercedes-AMG Team Craft-Bamboo Racing completed the weekend with Mercedes-AMG factory driver Edoardo Mortara in the #77 entry sponsored by Tsingtao move from 14th on the grid to finish 6th. Surprising considering that the car was hit from behind and damaged heavily in the Qualification Race on Saturday. In the sister Evisu-sponsored #88 Mercedes-AMG GT3, Macau debutant and Belgian Alessio Picariello demonstrated his abilities on this demanding street circuit, improving with every session and ran as high as P6 in the main race. However whilst defending against a BMW behind, he outbraked himself and had contact with the wall, forcing him to retire.

== Intercontinental GT Challenge ==
=== Porsche 991 GT3 R (2018) ===
EuroMechanica joins Craft-Bamboo Racing as title sponsor for the #991 Porsche 911 GT3 R for the 2018 Liqui Moly Bathurst 12 Hour with an all Porsche factory driver line-up. Running a full factory driver line-up consisting of, Kevin Estre, Laurens Vanthoor and Earl Bamber, the trio will pilot the EuroMechanica backed #991 Porsche 911 GT3 R came fifth in the race. The team also entered in the 2018 Suzuka 10 Hours, with Kévin Estre Mathieu Jaminet and Laurens Vanthoor driving the #991 car.

=== Mercedes-AMG GT3 (2019-) ===
From 2019 to 2020, Craft-Bamboo partnered up with Black Falcon Racing for the Bathurst 12 Hour. With the best results of fifth in 2020 after tyre puncture 20 minutes from the end destroyed any chances of a top-three finish. Craft-Bamboo also entered in the 2019 Suzuka 10 Hours, with Yelmer Buurman, Maximilian Götz, and Luca Stolz driving the #77 car.

== Asian Le Mans Series ==
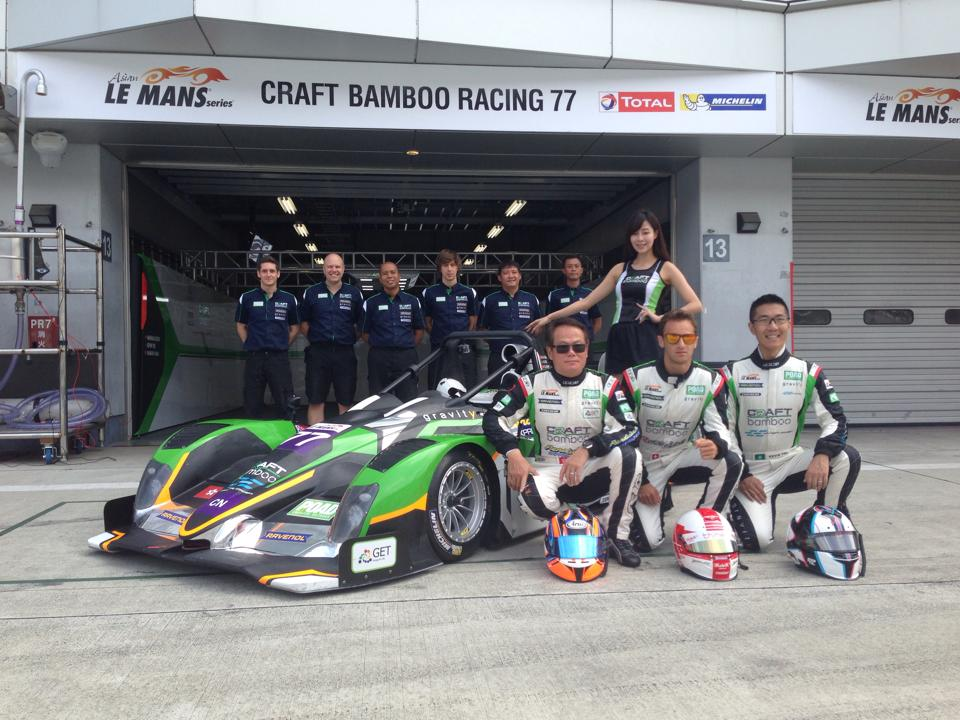
Chan, Beche & Tse at 3 Hours of Fuji 2014

2014 also saw Craft Bamboo enter the Asian Le Mans series in the CN category with a solitary Ligier Morgan-Judd after initially confirming two CN cars alongside an LMP2 entry. A perfect season was completed with the squad taking class pole, victory and fastest lap at each of the four rounds as they were crowned Champions. Full season driver Kevin Tse also took the drivers title. Mathias Beche, Jonathan Venter, Samson Chan, Frank Yu and Naoki Yokomizo all drove for part of the season. Craft Bamboo would not return in 2015 to defend their title, choosing to focus on other series.

== TCR Asia ==
In June 2015 Craft Bamboo announced their entry in to the inaugural 2015 TCR Asia Series, a six event series.

== Results ==
=== World Touring Car Championship ===
Year	Car	Drivers	Races	Wins	Y.T. Wins	Poles	F.L.	Points	Y.T. Pos.	D.C.	T.C.
2010	Chevrolet Lacetti	(Hong Kong) Darryl O'Young	22	0	3	0	0	15	4th	15th	**2nd**
2010	Chevrolet Lacetti	(Japan) Yukinori Taniguchi	8	0	1	0	0	4	10th	18th	**2nd**
2010	Chevrolet Lacetti	(United Kingdom) Harry Vaulkhard	14	0	1	0	0	1	8th	21st	**2nd**
2011	Chevrolet Lacetti; Chevrolet Cruze 1.6T	(Hong Kong) Darryl O'Young	24	0	1	0	0	43	6th	14th	5th
2011	Chevrolet Lacetti; Chevrolet Cruze 1.6T	(Japan) Yukinori Taniguchi	21	0	0	0	0	6	13th	20th	5th
2012	Chevrolet Cruze 1.6T	(United Kingdom) Alex MacDowall	24	0	2	0	0	68	5th	11th	4th
2012	Chevrolet Cruze 1.6T	(Hong Kong) Darryl O'Young	8	0	2	0	0	37	6th	14th	4th
2012	Chevrolet Cruze 1.6T	(Denmark) Michel Nykjær	2	0	1	0	0	20	12th	16th	4th
2012	Chevrolet Cruze 1.6T	(Italy) Pasquale di Sabatino	16	0	0	0	0	0	16th	NC	4th
2012	Chevrolet Cruze 1.6T	(United States) Robb Holland	2	0	0	0	0	0	20th	NC	4th
2013	Chevrolet Cruze 1.6T	(United Kingdom) Alex MacDowall	24	0	5	0	2	141	**2nd**	11th	**2nd**
2013	Chevrolet Cruze 1.6T	(United Kingdom) James Nash	24	2	7	0	0	223	**1st**	**3rd**	**2nd**
2015	Chevrolet RML Cruze TC1	(France) Gregoire Demoustier	24	0	0	0	0	5	7th	20th	6th

Y.T. signifies Yokohama Trophy for which independent teams and drivers are eligible

=== GP3 Series ===
Year	Car	Drivers	Races	Wins	Poles	F.L.	Points	D.C.	T.C.
2013	Dallara GP3/13-Renault	(United Kingdom) Lewis Williamson	14	0	0	0	44	11th	6th
2013	Dallara GP3/13-Renault	(United Kingdom) Melville McKee	14	1	0	0	31	14th	6th
2013	Dallara GP3/13-Renault	(Spain) Carmen Jordá	16	0	0	0	0	30th	6th
2013	Dallara GP3/13-Renault	(United Kingdom) Alice Powell	2	0	0	0	0	31st	6th

=== In detail ===
(key) (Races in bold indicate pole position) (Races in italics indicate fastest lap)

Year	Chassis Engine Tyres	Drivers	1	2	3	4	5	6	7	8	9	10	11	12	13	14	15	16	T.C.	Points
2013	GP3/13; AER; **P**		CAT; FEA	CAT; SPR	VAL; FEA	VAL; SPR	SIL; FEA	SIL; SPR	NÜR; FEA	NÜR; SPR	HUN; FEA	HUN; SPR	SPA; FEA	SPA; SPR	MNZ; FEA	MNZ; SPR	YMC; FEA	YMC; SPR	6th	75
2013	GP3/13; AER; **P**	(United Kingdom) Lewis Williamson	11	7	19	17	25^{†}	14	4	4	24	Ret	14	10	4	3			6th	75
2013	GP3/13; AER; **P**	(United Kingdom) Melville McKee	14	Ret	11	Ret	24	15	7	1	17	Ret	7	Ret	12	7			6th	75
2013	GP3/13; AER; **P**	(United Kingdom) Alice Powell															19	20	6th	75
2013	GP3/13; AER; **P**	(Spain) Carmen Jordá	22	18	Ret	21	23	19	DSQ	24	22	21	19	19	18	17	Ret	23	6th	75

=== World Endurance Championship ===
Year	Car	Number	Drivers	Races	Wins	Poles	F.L.	Points	D.C.	T.C.
2014	Aston Martin Vantage GTE	**#99**	(Hong Kong) Darryl O'Young (United Kingdom) Alex MacDowall (Brazil) Fernando Rees	7	0	1	0	55.5	12th	6th

=== FIA GT World Cup ===
Year	Car	Drivers	Number	Races	Poles	F.L.	Points	D.C.	M.C.
2015	Aston Martin Vantage GT3	(Hong Kong) Darryl O'Young	55	2	0	0	10	5th	3rd
2015	Aston Martin Vantage GT3	(United Kingdom) Richard Lyons	99	2	0	0	0	7th	3rd
2015	Aston Martin Vantage GT3	(Germany) Stefan Mucke	97	2	1	2	15	**3rd**	3rd
2016	Porsche 991 GT3 R	(Hong Kong) Darryl O'Young	55	1	0	0	0	Ret	2nd
2016	Porsche 991 GT3 R	(United Kingdom) Richard Lyons	88	1	0	0	0	Ret	2nd
2017	Porsche 991 GT3 R	(Hong Kong) Darryl O'Young	991	2	0	0	0	Ret	4th
2017	Porsche 991 GT3 R	(Belgium) Laurens Vanthoor	911	1	0	0	0	Ret	4th
2018	Porsche 991 GT3 R	(Hong Kong) Darryl O'Young	55	2	0	0	0	13th	4th
2018	Porsche 991 GT3 R	(France) Mathieu Jaminet	991	2	0	0	2	9th	4th
2019	Mercedes-AMG GT3	(Switzerland) Edoardo Mortara	55	2	0	0	8	6th	3rd
2019	Mercedes-AMG GT3	(Belgium) Alessio Picariello	991	2	0	0	0	13th	3rd

=== TCR International Series ===
Year	Car	Drivers	Races	Wins	Poles	F.L.	Points	D.C.	T.C.
2015	SEAT León Cup Racer	(Spain) Pepe Oriola	22	2	1	4	312	**2nd**	**2nd**
2015	SEAT León Cup Racer	(Russia) Sergey Afanasyev	21	0	0	1	134	7th	**2nd**
2015	SEAT León Cup Racer	(Spain) Jordi Gene	22	3	1	1	285	**3rd**	**2nd**
2015	SEAT León Cup Racer	(Hong Kong) Frank Yu	6	0	0	0	2	37th	**2nd**

=== GT Asia Series ===
Year	Car	Number	Drivers	Races	Wins	Poles	F.L.	Points	D.C.	T.C.
2014	Aston Martin Vantage GT3	#97	(Hong Kong) Frank Yu	13	1	1	3	122	7th	2nd
2014	Aston Martin Vantage GT3	#97	(Australia) Warren Luff	2	0	0	0	23	25th	2nd
2014	Aston Martin Vantage GT3	#97	(United Kingdom) Richard Lyons	4	0	1	0	40	17th	2nd
2014	Aston Martin Vantage GT3	#97	(Germany) Stefan Mucke	6	1	0	3	43	15th	2nd
2014	Aston Martin Vantage GT3	#99	(Malaysia) Natasha Seatter	2	0	0	0	11	46th	2nd
2014	Aston Martin Vantage GT3	#99	(South Korea) Tacksung Kim	2	0	0	0	11	46th	2nd
2014	Aston Martin Vantage GT3	#99	(Australia) Daniel Bilski	4	0	0	0	20	30th	2nd
2014	Aston Martin Vantage GT3	#99	(Australia) Jonathan Venter	6	0	0	0	34	20th	2nd
2014	Aston Martin Vantage GT3	#99	(Netherlands) Carlo van Dam	2	0	0	0	18	31st	2nd
2014	Aston Martin Vantage GT3	#99	(Thailand) Tanart Sathienthirakul	2	0	0	0	18	31st	2nd
2014	Aston Martin Vantage GT3	#99	(United States) Kevin Gleason	2	0	0	0	14	45th	2nd
2015	Aston Martin Vantage GT3	#88	(Hong Kong) Frank Yu	11	0	0	0	58	11th	2nd
2015	Aston Martin Vantage GT3	#88	(United Kingdom) Richard Lyons	11	0	3	0	58	11th	2nd
2015	Aston Martin Vantage GT3	#99	(Hong Kong) Darryl O'Young	11	4	0	0	127	**1st**	2nd
2015	Aston Martin Vantage GT3	#99	(Australia) Jonathan Venter	6	1	2	0	63	9th	2nd
2015	Aston Martin Vantage GT3	#99	(United Kingdom) Daniel Lloyd	5	3	2	0	64	8th	2nd
