= Audi A5 =

Compact executive car

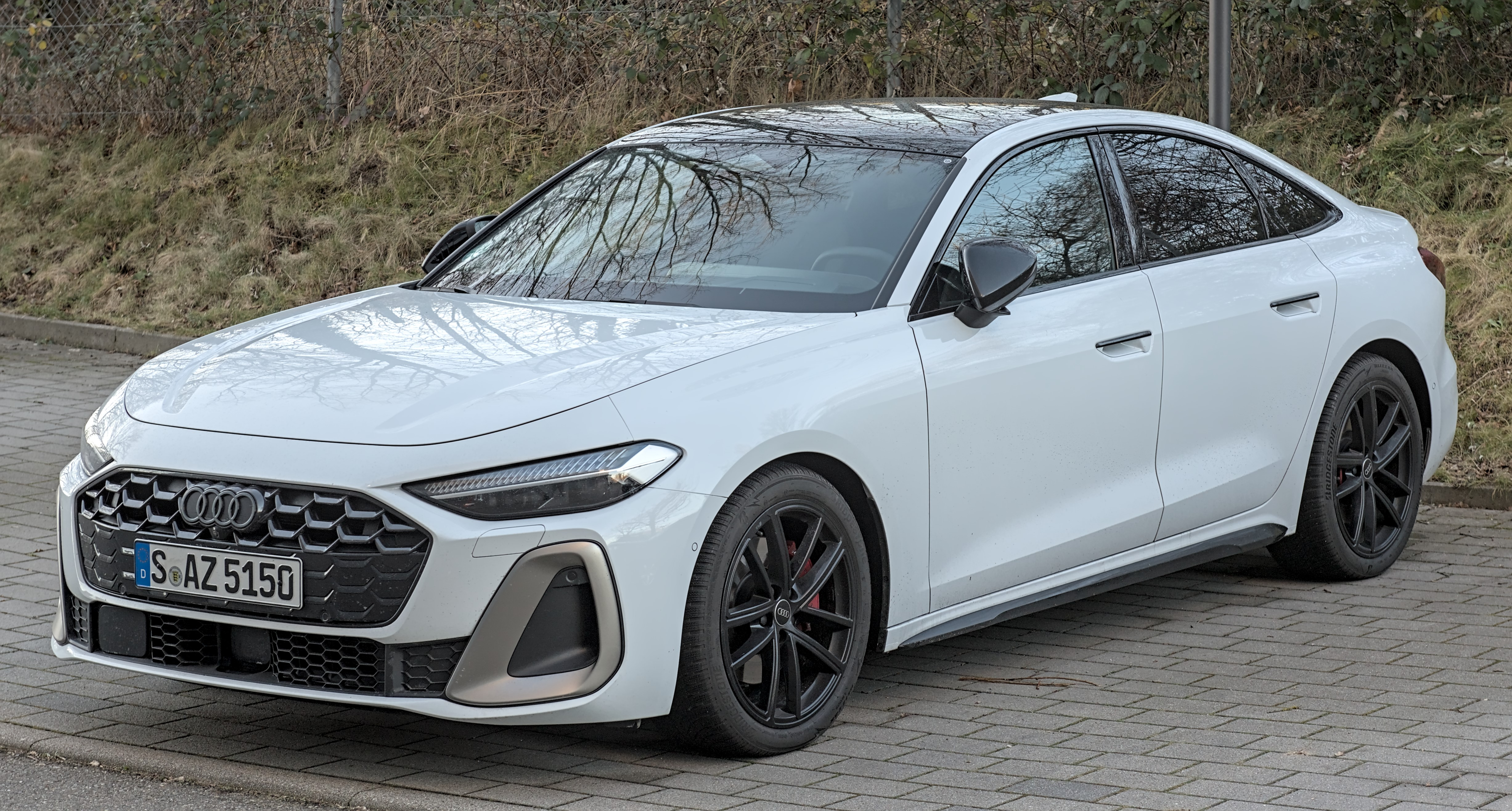
- Audi A5 B10, 2024

Overview
- Manufacturer: Audi AG
- Production: 2007–present

Body and chassis
- Class: Compact executive car (D); Grand tourer (S) (2007–2024)
- Layout: Front-engine, front-wheel-drive / all-wheel-drive (quattro)
- Related: Audi A4

The Audi A5 is a series of compact executive and grand touring coupé cars produced by the German automobile manufacturer Audi since June 2007. The A5 range also includes the coupe, cabriolet, and "Sportback"—a five-door liftback with a fastback roofline—derived from the Audi A4 saloon and estate models.

Under Audi's internal platform numbering convention, the A5 is a member of the B-platform series of vehicles, sharing its platform designation with the A4 saloon and Avant. The first generation A5 (Type 8T) belongs to the B8 family, while the second-generation model (Type 8W6) is based on the B9. Both generations are derived from the Volkswagen MLB (Modular Longitudinal Matrix) architecture.

== First generation (2007) ==
First generation
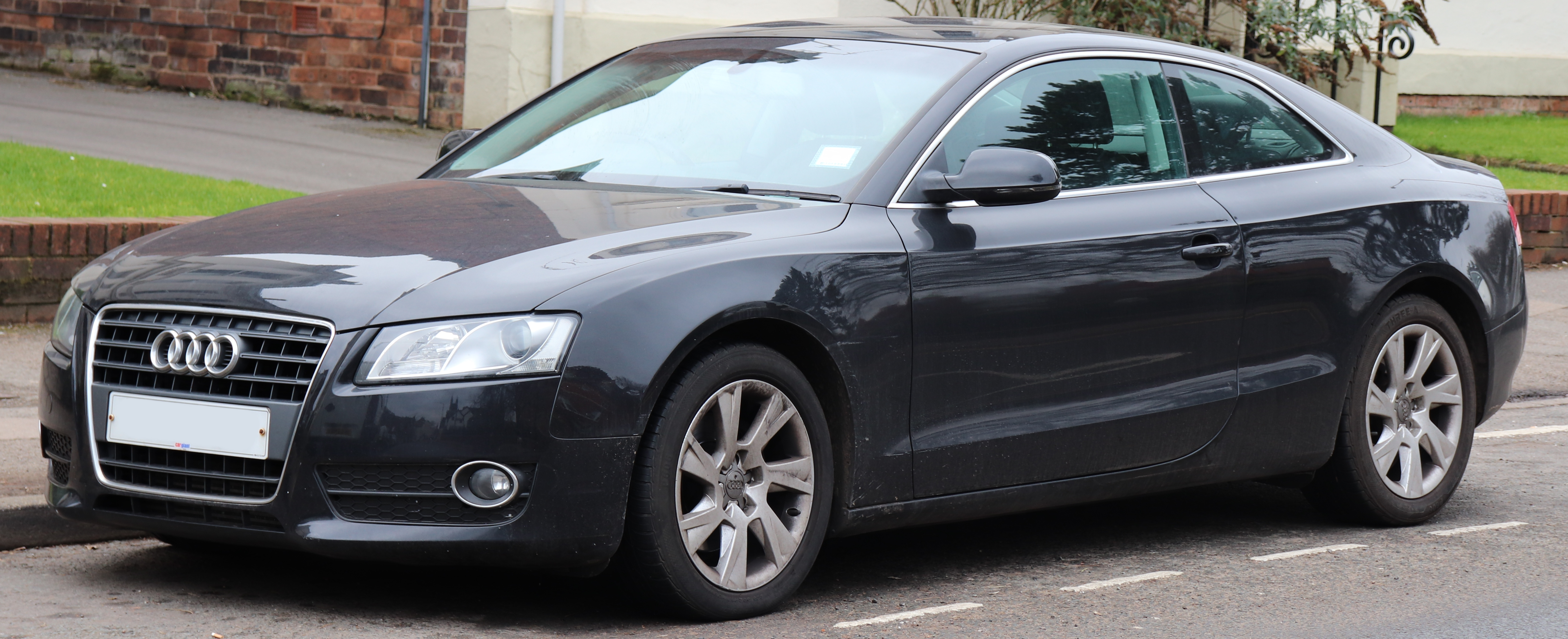
- Pre-facelift Audi A5 Coupé 2.0 TDi SE

Overview
- Model code: 8T/8F
- Production: November 2007 – November 2016
- Model years: 2008–2016
- Assembly: Germany: Ingolstadt (Coupe & Sportback); Germany: Neckarsulm (Cabriolet)
- Designer: Walter de Silva; Satoshi Wada (2003); Achim Badstübner (facelift); Markus Gleitz (Sportback)

Body and chassis
- Body style: 2-door coupé; 2-door convertible; 4-door liftback sedan
- Platform: Volkswagen Group MLB platform

Powertrain
- Engine: Petrol: 1.8 L TFSI I4; 2.0 L TFSI I4; 3.2 L FSI V6; 3.0 L TFSI V6; 4.2 L FSI V8; Diesel: 2.0 L TDI CR I4; 2.7 L TDI CR V6; 3.0 L TDI CR V6
- Transmission: 6-speed manual, 6-speed Tiptronic automatic 7-speed S tronic dual-clutch automatic 8-speed Tiptronic automatic Multitronic CVT

Dimensions
- Wheelbase: Coupé & Cabriolet: 2,751 mm (108.3 in); Sportback: 2,811 mm (110.7 in)
- Length: Coupé & Cabriolet: 4,626 mm (182.1 in); Sportback: 4,712 mm (185.5 in)
- Width: 1,854 mm (73.0 in)
- Height: Coupé: 1,372 mm (54.0 in); Cabriolet: 1,383 mm (54.4 in); Sportback: 1,391 mm (54.8 in)
- Kerb weight: Coupé: 1,500 kg (3,307 lb); Cabriolet: 1,695 kg (3,737 lb); Sportback: 1,565 kg (3,450 lb)

Chronology
- Predecessor: Audi Coupé (B3) (A5 Coupe); Audi A4 Cabriolet (8H) (A5 Cabriolet)

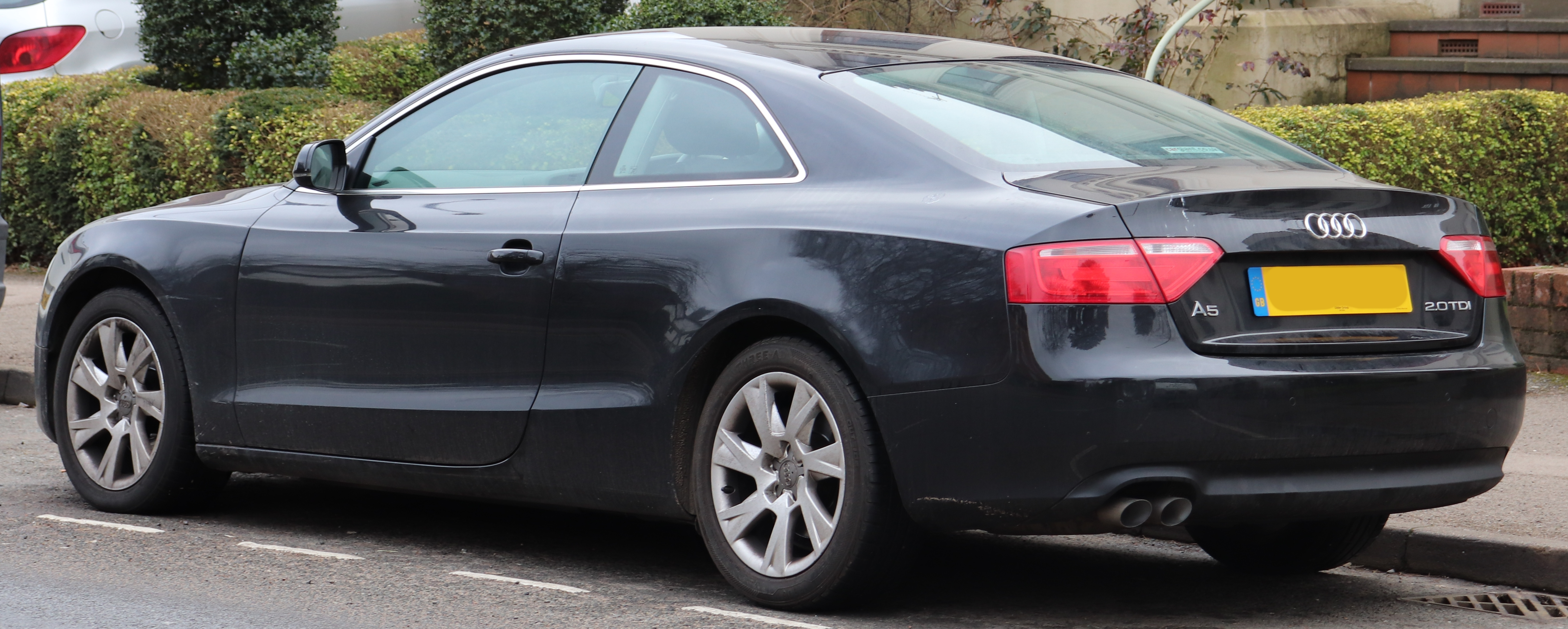
Coupe (pre-facelift)

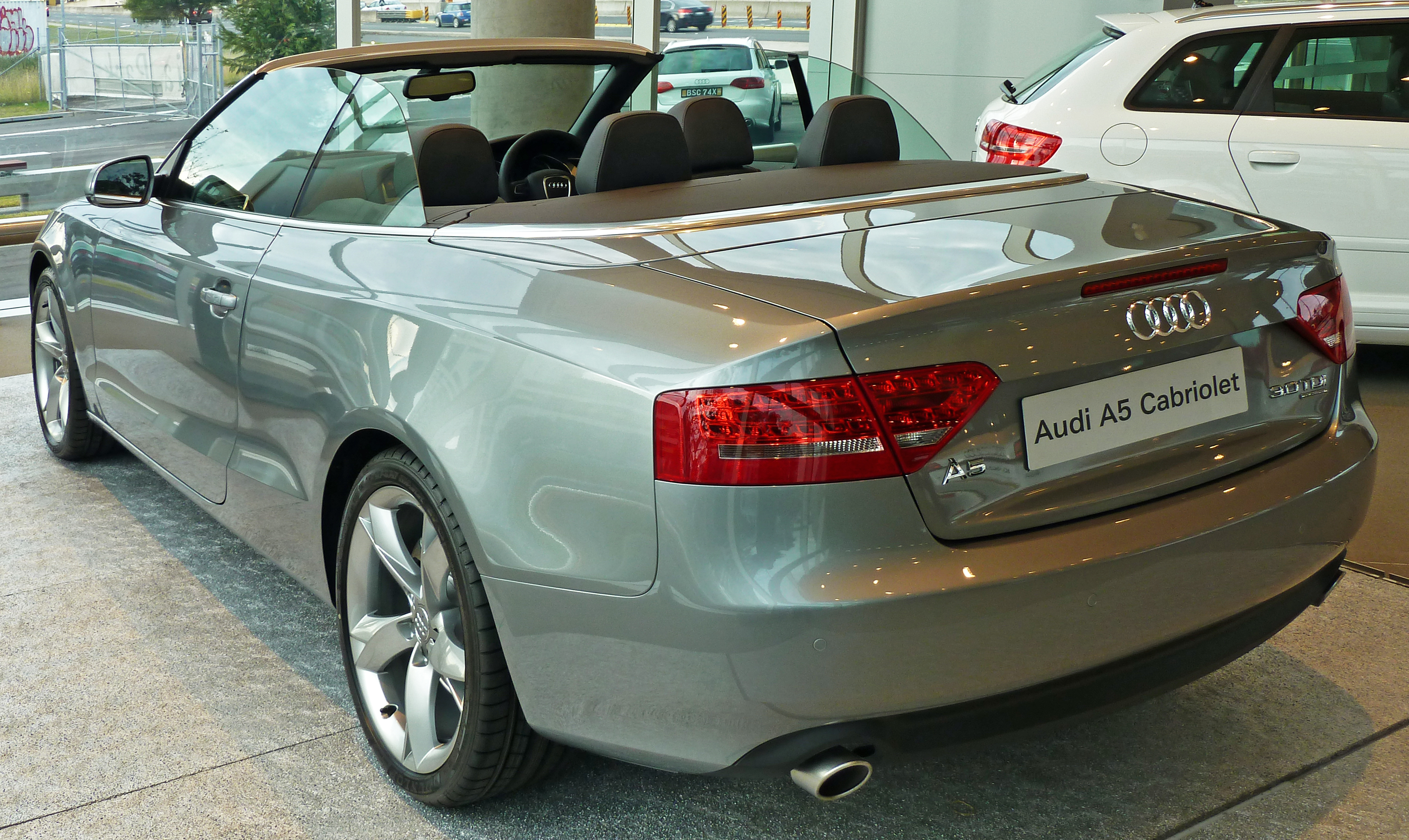
Cabriolet (pre-facelift)

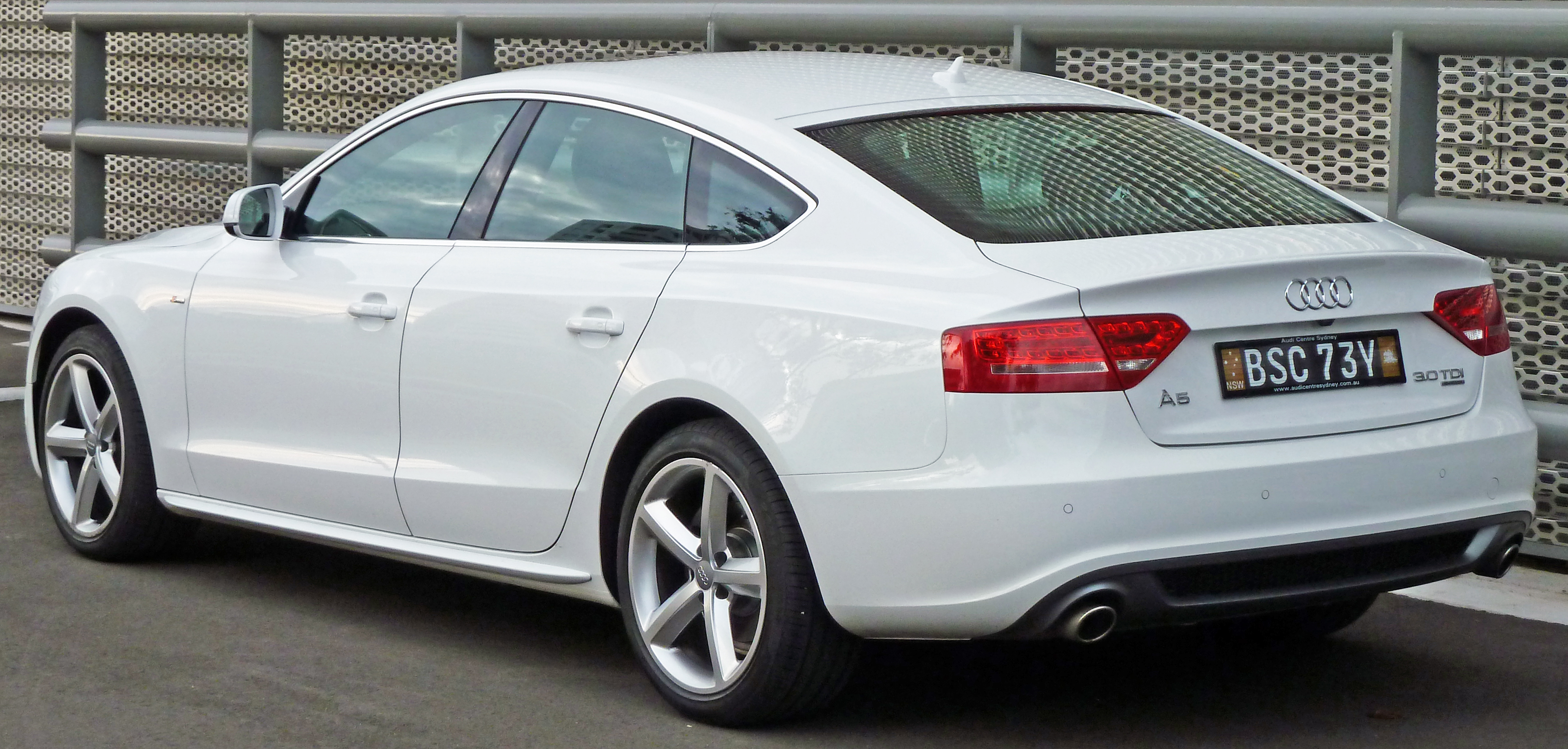
Sportback (pre-facelift)

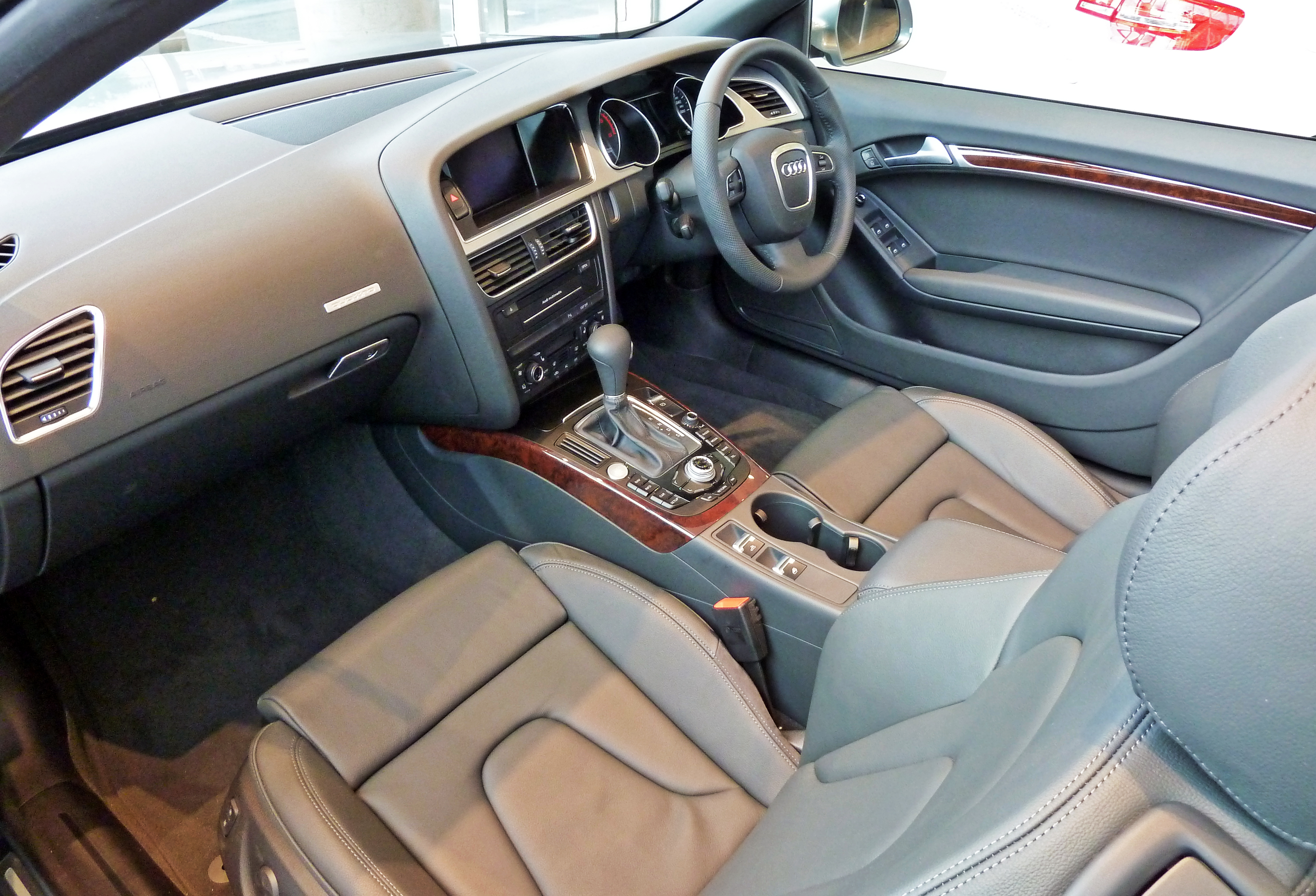
Interior

=== Initial release ===
When unveiled at the March 2007 Geneva Motor Show, the A5 marked Audi's return to the compact executive coupé market after the (B3/B4) Audi 80-based coupé ended production in 1996. On May 10, 2006, Audi confirmed that the A5 would go into production. The B6/B7 A4 included a convertible variant but no coupé. For the fourth-generation A4 (B8), Audi decided to spin off the cabriolet, along with a new coupé and four-door fastback sedan, into a distinct nameplate as the A5.

The A5 was the first vehicle in the B8 family to be released (the others being the A4 and the Q5 crossover SUV), all of which were based on the Audi MLP (Modular Longitudinal Platform). This platform underpins the next-generation A6 and A8.

The A5 is the third coupé in Audi's lineup, following the second-generation TT and the R8. It adopted design elements from the Nuvolari quattro concept car and debuted with a 3.2-litre FSI V6 engine, delivering 195 kW (265 PS; 261 hp).

==== Coupé (8T3) ====
The A5 and S5 design was based on the Nuvolari quattro concept car. The A5 and the S5 Coupé were unveiled simultaneously at the Salon International de l'Auto (Geneva) and the Melbourne International Motor Shows on 6 March 2007.

Orders for the A5 and S5 began the same day as their unveiling, 6 March 2007; the first deliveries were made in June 2007. Launch models included the 3.2-litre FSI V6 engine multitronic and the 3.0-litre TDI quattro 6-speed, with the 1.8-litre TFSI available in late 2007.

Early U.S. models included the A5 3.2-litre FSI quattro and the S5 coupé 4.2-litre FSI quattro. Both included either a six-speed manual or a six-speed Tiptronic automatic transmission. The S5 model went on sale in November 2007, initially equipped only with a manual transmission, while the A5 with Tiptronic became available in early 2008.

The A5 went on sale in Canada in 2008, featuring the A5 3.2-litre FSI with a choice of a six-speed manual or six-speed Tiptronic transmission. Since 2011, only the 2.0-litre turbo engines have been available for the A5 in Canada. In 2013, Audi introduced the A5 Black Edition.

==== Cabriolet (8F) ====
Production of both the Audi A5 and the S5 Cabriolet (convertible) began in early 2009. The A5 Cabriolet included a fabric roof as opposed to the retractable hardtop used on the Volkswagen Eos. The engine range was the same as contemporary A5 coupé models, but the S5 Cabriolet featured a 3.0 TFSI V6 supercharged engine.

The A5 Cabriolet replaced the A4 Cabriolet. Deliveries of the A5 Cabriolet began in the second quarter of 2009. The vehicle was unveiled at the 2009 New York Auto Show.

The U.S. versions of the A5 and S5 Cabriolet went on sale in September 2009 as 2010 models. Early models included the A5 2.0-litre I4 TFSI Multitronic, A5 2.0-litre quattro Tiptronic, and S5 quattro S-Tronic.

==== Sportback (8T8) ====
The A5 Sportback has four frameless doors and a long, tapering fastback-like roofline, giving it a 'four-door coupé-like' appearance. While it shares many exterior design cues with the A5 coupé, the Sportback's interior is similar to that of the A4 saloon. Although all A5 models share the same platform as the A4, the Sportback is closer in design to the A4 than to the rest of the A5 family.

The Sportback has been described as 'a saloon with the front end (including an identical S-line look) and taillights of the A5 coupé but the wheelbase of the A4,' with the Sportback positioned more as a 'designer's car' compared to the more conventional A4 saloon.

The Sportback model is available in Europe, Japan, South Korea, China, Australia, New Zealand, the Middle East, Mexico, Argentina, and South Africa. Although not originally sold in the United States and Canada, the A5 Sportback entered the North American market as a 2018 model at the beginning of 2017.

Early production models included the 2.0-litre TFSI quattro 155 kW (211 PS; 208 hp), 3.2-litre FSI quattro, 2.0-litre TDI 125 kW (170 PS; 168 hp) with a six-speed manual gearbox and start/stop system, 2.7-litre TDI, and the 3.0-litre TDI quattro. Production versions went on sale in September 2009.

The A5 Sportback is available with two petrol engines and three diesel engines.

==== S5 (2007) ====
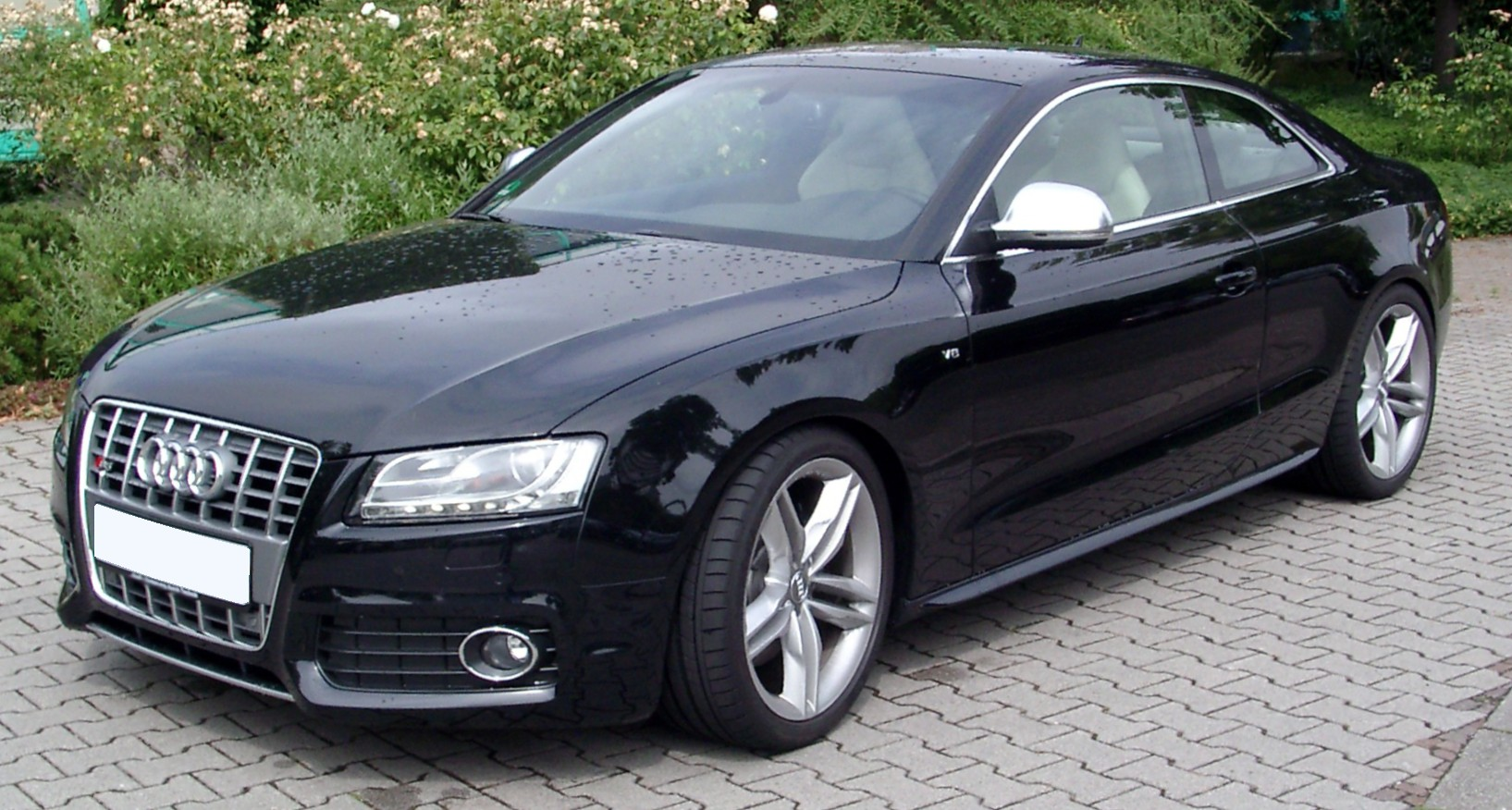
Audi S5 Coupé (8T3, Germany)

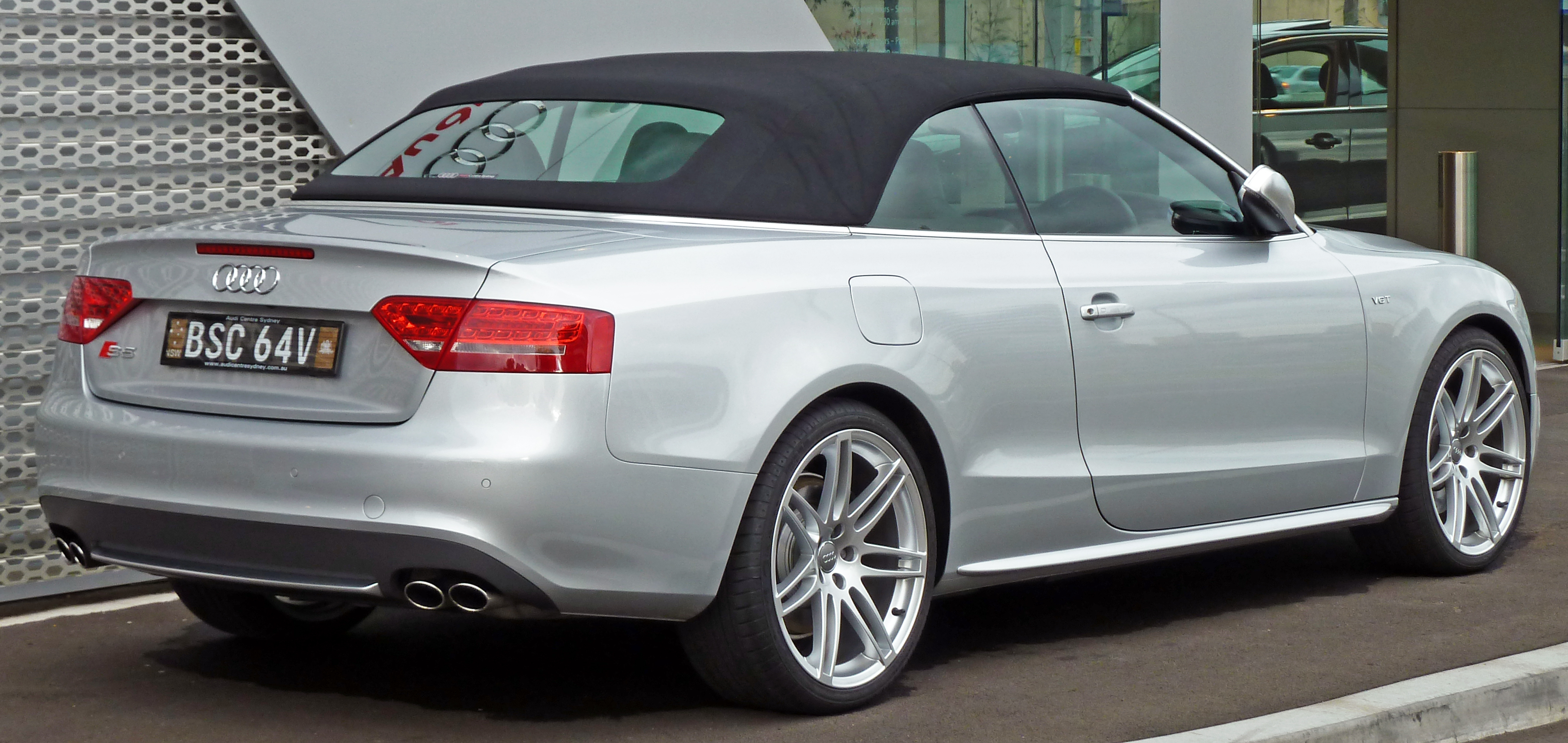
Audi S5 Cabriolet (8F7, Australia)

The Audi S5 was released in coupé form to the public at the same time as the A5. The Audi S5, in comparison to the A5, features a different fascia (as do most Audi S and RS models), including a string of LED daytime running lights around the bi-Xenon headlamps and a vertically striped chrome grille.

In many markets, the S5 includes as standard, 19-inch alloy wheels with a five parallel spoke design, bigger brakes, heated leather sport seats, and other convenience features, some of which are available only as an option on the A5. Changes for the 2010 model year include LED tail lamps, the introduction of Premium Plus and Prestige trim levels, and new optional equipment such as Leather/Alcantara seats.

Despite sharing the same nameplate, the powertrains were different between the coupé and the Cabriolet/Sportback for the 2010–12 model years. The 2010–12 Audi S5 coupé had a 4.2 litre fuel stratified injection (FSI) V8 engine that produces 260 kW (349 hp), while the S5 Cabriolet and Sportback have a supercharged 3.0 litre TFSI V6 engine producing 245 kW (329 hp) which is shared with the 2010 Audi S4 3.0 TFSI quattro sedan and avant.

The coupé had a choice of either a six speed manual or six speed Tiptronic automatic, while the Cabriolet/Sportback has the seven speed S-tronic dual-clutch automatic transmission.

==== Aluminium A5 Coupé ====
The Aluminium A5 Coupé is a prototype vehicle demonstrating the aluminium Audi Space Frame (ASF) concept. It is based on Audi A5 Coupé 2.0 TFSI with 155 kW (211 PS; 208 hp) engine, but it uses the aluminium Audi Space Frame, aluminium and carbon fibre-reinforced plastics body. Punch riveting, bonding or laser-MIG hybrid welding replaced spot welding. The vehicle is 110 kg (243 lb) lighter than the equivalent steel-bodied production model.

The vehicle was built by Audi's Aluminium and Lightweight Design Centre in Neckarsulm.

==== RS5 (2010) ====
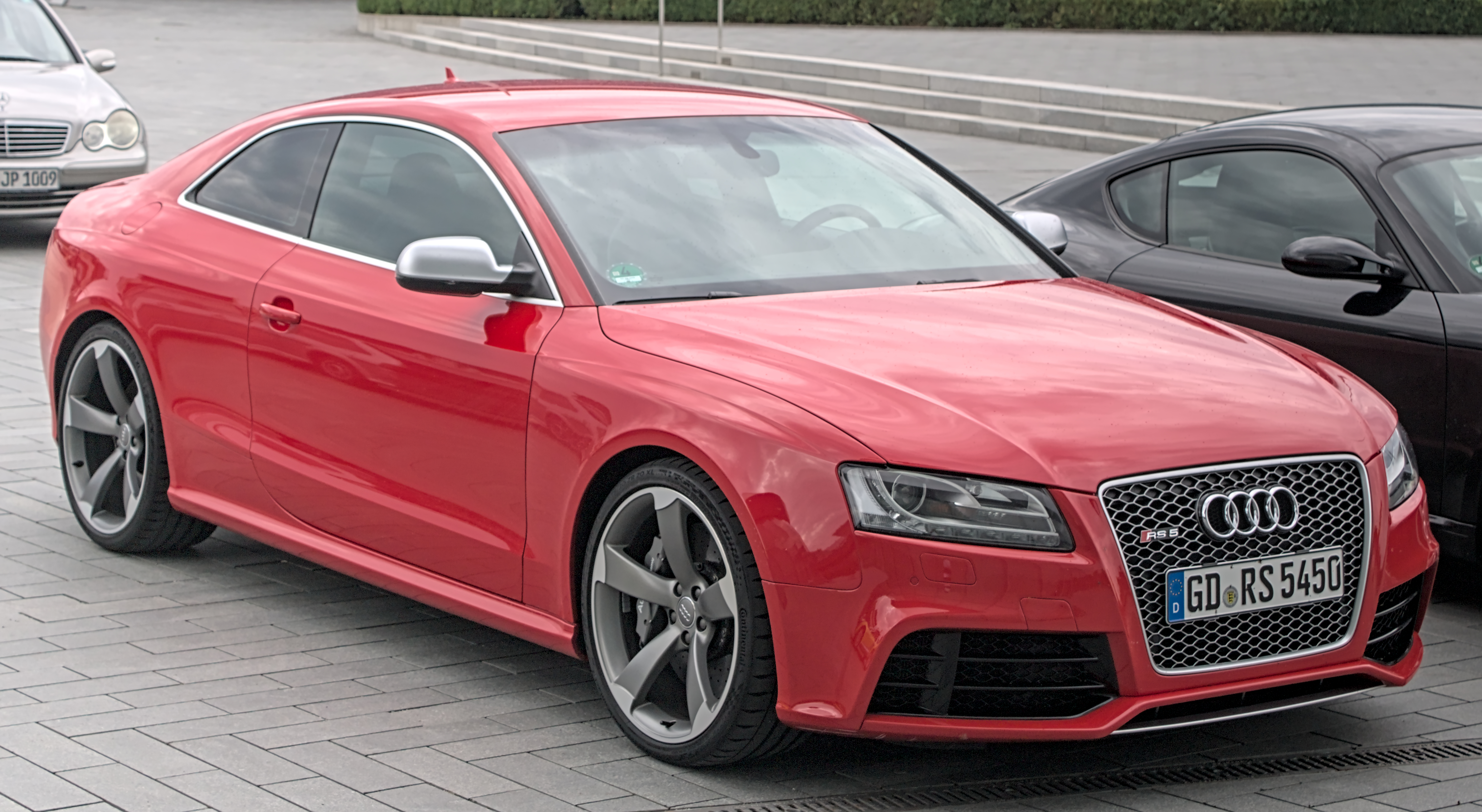
Audi RS5 coupe

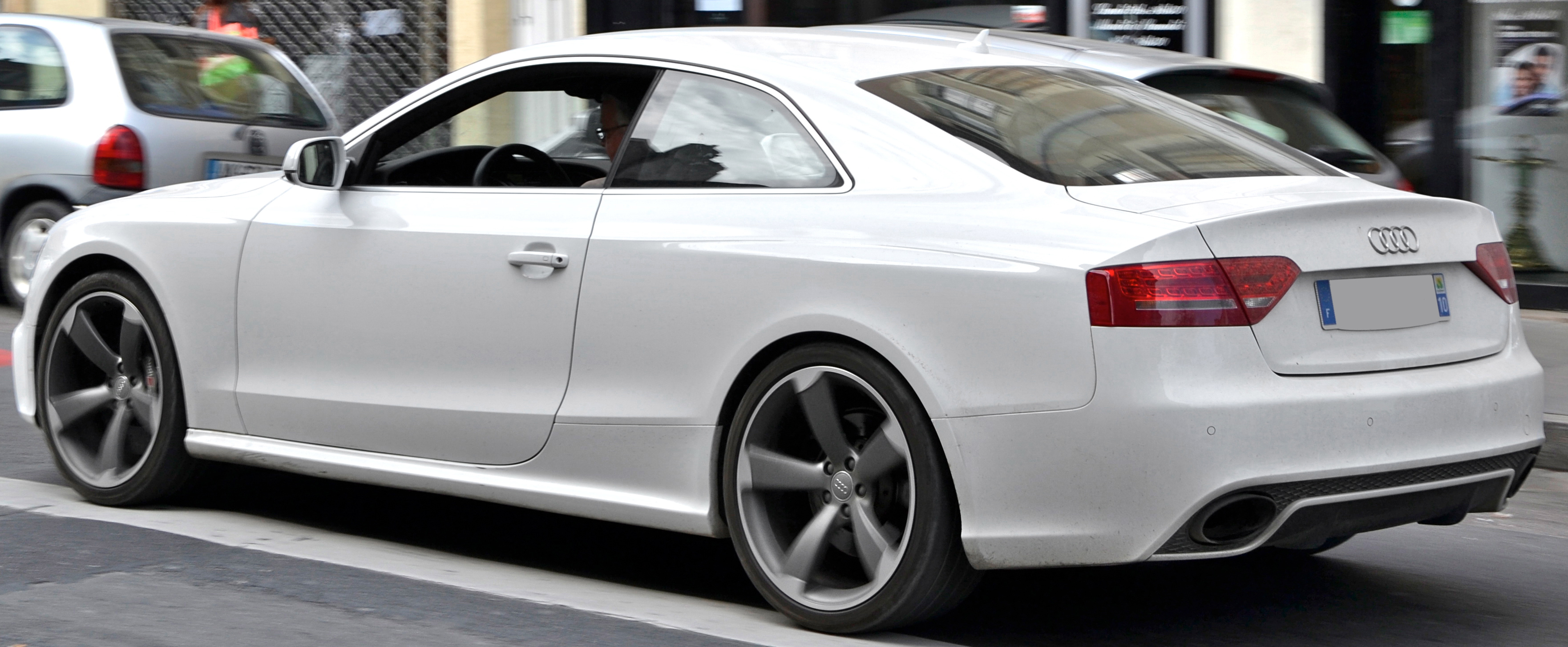
Audi RS5 coupe

Available in the coupé bodystyle, the RS5 features a 4.2 FSI engine rated at 450 PS (331 kW; 444 hp) at 8250 rpm and 430 N⋅m (317.15 lb⋅ft) at 4000-6000 rpm, coupled with a seven-speed S-Tronic transmission and quattro permanent all-wheel-drive with crown-gear centre differential and electronic torque vectoring. It has 19 inch alloy wheels in an exclusive five arm structure design with 275/35 tires (optional 19 inch winter wheels), 365 mm (14.37 in) diameter ventilated aluminium front brake discs (optional 380 mm (14.96 in) diameter carbon ceramic front brake discs), aluminium 8 piston brake calipers from the Audi R8, painted RS logos in high-gloss black, electronic stabilization program with integrated sport mode, speed dependent Servotronic steering, Audi Drive Select with three (4 with MMI navigation system) modes of operation (comfort, auto, and dynamic, optional custom), and optional dynamic steering.

On the exterior, the RS5 features a single-frame grille with a shiny charcoal grey rhombus pattern grid, Xenon plus headlights with a sweeping strip of LED daytime running lights, redesigned bumper tapers downward into a splitter, flared fenders inspired by Audi Quattro, side sills with angular caps, trim strips with aluminium look on the single-frame grille and near the side windows and the outside mirrors; a choice of eight body colours, two oval exhaust pipes integrated within the bumper, a spoiler in the tailgate which automatically extends at 120 km/h (75 mph) and retracts at 80 km/h (50 mph), and an extensively clad underbody integrating air vents for the seven-speed S-Tronic and the front brakes.

In the interior, the model has electrically adjustable sports seats in leather/Alcantara combination upholstery with side sections and integrated head restraints (optional bucket seats with more prominent contours and folding backrests, ventilated and luxuriously upholstered climate-controlled comfort seats; optional seat upholstery featuring special leathers and colours as well as silver headlining), steering wheel upholstered in perforated leather, black gauges with white lettering and distinctive scaling, driver information system with integrated lap timer and an oil temperature gauge, black interior with decorative inlays made of carbon fibre (optional dark stainless-steel mesh, black piano finish or brushed aluminium inlay), instrument panel fascia in piano finish, pedals, footrests, optional MMI navigation systems' control buttons in aluminium; door handles with two slim strips, aluminium inserts at door sill trims and RS 5 logos, optional suede-covered controls and floor mats bearing RS 5 logos, sport exhaust system with a sound flap and black tailpipe trims.

A Carbon design package is available for the engine compartment and for the vehicle body. Styling packages include a black or matte aluminium look.

The RS5 weighs 1,800 kg (3,968 lb), with a weight distribution of 56.3 percent at the front and 43.7 percent in the rear. Audi has added two electro-mechanical systems which ensure the care is neutral in corners. The stability-control system attempts to stop front-end plow before it happens by squeezing the brakes on the inside wheels which effectively drag those tires enough to pull the car into the corner.

The RS5 also has an active rear differential that can apportion power between the rear wheels to create a similar effect or even oversteer; in normal conditions, Quattro all-wheel-drive delivers 60% of the engine's torque rearward and rising to as much as 85 percent depending on conditions. Road & Track's Randy Pobst stated it handled better than the R8. Stephen Reil has noted that it was tested over 10k miles on the Nurburgring with input on suspension from the companies Le Mans winning race drivers.

According to Quattro GmbH chief Stephan Reil, the 4.2 FSI engine is closest related to Audi's 5.2 FSI V10 engine found in the second generation Audi R8 and Lamborghini Huracán. It features the same quasi-dry sump high G lubrication system found in the Audi R8 GT3 LMS and represents the best, most reliable, and most efficient naturally aspirated V8 engine that Audi engineers could create as the company knew it would be all turbo powered moving forward.

The vehicle was unveiled at the 2010 Geneva Motor Show. Sales of the RS5 began in early 2010.

==== Ethanol E100 Coupé ====
The Ethanol E100 Coupé is a prototype designed for the Michelin Challenge Bibendum 2010 series. It includes a 2.0 TFSI engine rated at 132 kW (179 PS; 177 hp) and 320 N⋅m (236 lbf⋅ft) of torque, six-gear manual quattro drivetrain. It can accelerate from 0–100 km/h (0–62 mph) in 6.9 seconds, with a top speed of 236 km/h (147 mph), and weighs 1,310 kg (2,888 lb). The car officially consumes 9.9 litres per 100 kilometres (29 mpg_{‑imp}; 24 mpg_{‑US}) when running on ethanol, but drivers managed 9.5 L/100 km (30 mpg_{‑imp}; 25 mpg_{‑US}) on ethanol during the Michelin Challenge Bibendum Rallye.

==== S5 Special Edition ====
The S5 Special Edition is a limited (125 units) version of the 2012 S5 4.2 FSI Quattro Coupé for the U.S. market, commemorating the end of Audi S5 4.2 FSI Quattro production. It included the Prestige Package, Daytona Grey body colour, 19-inch 5-spoke Rotor design wheels, a two-tone Polar Silver and Black S5 sport seats, silver contrast stitching on the seats, armrests, shifter and steering wheel; floor mats with a silver leather border, aluminium 'Audi exclusive' badges on door panels, carbon fibre beltline and a piano black instrument cluster.

The vehicle was unveiled at the 2012 Audi Club North America meeting at Infineon Raceway.

==== Specifications ====
===== Body styles =====
Body types	Coupé	Cabriolet	Sportback
Model	Years		
A5 1.8 TFSI (118 kW)	2009–2016	2009–2016	2009–2016
A5 1.8 TFSI (125 kW)	2007–2008	–	–
A5 1.8 TFSI (130 kW)	2012–2016	–	2016
A5 2.0 TFSI (132 kW)	2008–2011	2009–2011	2009–2011
A5 2.0 TFSI (155 kW) quattro	2008–2016	2009–2016	2009–2016
A5 3.0 TFSI quattro	2012–2016	2009–2016	2009–2016
A5 3.2 FSI	2007–2011	2009–2011	2009–2011
S5 4.2 FSI quattro	2007–2012	–	–
RS5 4.2 FSI quattro	2010–2016	2012–2016	–
A5 2.0 TDI (105 kW)	–	2010–2016	2010–2016
A5 2.0 TDI (125 kW)	2008–2011	2009–2011	2009–2011
A5 2.7 TDI	2007–2011	2009–2011	2009–2011
A5 3.0 TDI (177 kW)	2007–2011	2009–2011	2009–2011

===== Engines =====
Model	Years	Type/code	Power, torque at rpm
Petrol engines
A5 1.8 TFSI Coupé	2007–2008	1,798 cc (109.7 cu in) I4 turbo (CABD)	125 kW (170 PS; 168 hp) at 6200, 250 N⋅m (184 lbf⋅ft) at 1500-4800
A5 1.8 TFSI	2009–2016	1,798 cc (109.7 cu in) I4 turbo (EA888) (CDHB)	118 kW (160 PS; 158 hp) at 6200, 250 N⋅m (184 lbf⋅ft) at 1500-4500
A5 1.8 TFSI	2016	1,798 cc (109.7 cu in) I4 turbo (CJEE) (CDHB)	130 kW (177 PS; 174 hp) at 6200, 320 N⋅m (236 lbf⋅ft) at 1400-4500
A5 2.0 TFSI	2008–2011	1,984 cc (121.1 cu in) I4 turbo (CDNB)	132 kW (179 PS; 177 hp) at 6000, 320 N⋅m (236 lbf⋅ft) at 1500-3900
A5 2.0 TFSI	2008–2016	1,984 cc (121.1 cu in) I4 turbo (EA888) (CDNC)	155 kW (211 PS; 208 hp) at 6000, 350 N⋅m (258 lbf⋅ft) at 1500-4200
A5 2.0 TFSI quattro	2008–2016	1,984 cc (121.1 cu in) I4 turbo (EA888) (CDNC, CPMA, CPMB)	155 kW (211 PS; 208 hp) at 6000, 350 N⋅m (258 lbf⋅ft) at 1500-4200
A5 3.0 TFSI, 3.0 TFSI quattro	2011–2016	2,995 cc (182.8 cu in) V6 supercharged	200 kW (272 PS; 268 hp) at 4780-6500, 400 N⋅m (295 lbf⋅ft) at 2150-4780
A5 3.2 FSI, 3.2 FSI quattro	2007–2011	3,197 cc (195.1 cu in) V6 (CALA)	195 kW (265 PS; 261 hp) at 6500, 330 N⋅m (243 lbf⋅ft) at 3000-5000
S5 3.0 TFSI quattro Cabriolet, Sportback	2009–2016	2,995 cc (182.8 cu in) V6 supercharged (CAKA, CCBA)	245 kW (333 PS; 329 hp) at 5500-7000, 440 N⋅m (325 lbf⋅ft) at 2900-5300
S5 4.2 FSI quattro Coupé	2007–2012	4,163 cc (254.0 cu in) V8 (CAUA)	260 kW (354 PS; 349 hp) at 7000, 440 N⋅m (325 lbf⋅ft) at 3500
RS5 4.2 FSI quattro Coupé	2010–2017	4,163 cc (254.0 cu in) V8 (CFSA)	331 kW (450 PS; 444 hp) at 8250, 430 N⋅m (317 lbf⋅ft) at 4000-6000
Diesel engines
A5 2.0 TDIe Sportback	2011–2016	1,968 cc (120.1 cu in) I4 turbo	100 kW (136 PS; 134 hp) at 4200, 320 N⋅m (236 lbf⋅ft) at 1750-2500
A5 2.0 TDI Sportback	2009–2016	1,968 cc (120.1 cu in) I4 turbo (CAGA)	105 kW (143 PS; 141 hp) at 4200, 320 N⋅m (236 lbf⋅ft) at 1750-2500
A5 2.0 TDI, 2.0 TDI quattro	2008–2011	1,968 cc (120.1 cu in) I4 turbo (CAHA)	125 kW (170 PS; 168 hp) at 4200, 350 N⋅m (258 lbf⋅ft) at 1750-2500
A5 2.0 TDI, 2.0 TDI multitronic	2011–2016	1,968 cc (120.1 cu in) I4 VTG turbo (CGLC)	130 kW (177 PS; 174 hp) at 4200, 380 N⋅m (280 lbf⋅ft) at 1750-2500
A5 2.7 TDI	2007-2011	2,698 cc (164.6 cu in) V6 turbo (CAMA, CGKA)	140 kW (190 PS; 188 hp) at 3500-4400, 400 N⋅m (295 lbf⋅ft) at 1400-3250
A5 3.0 TDI quattro	2011–2015	2,967 cc (181.1 cu in) V6 turbo (CLA, CLAA)	150 kW (204 PS; 201 hp) at 3500-4000, 400 N⋅m (295 lbf⋅ft) at 1250-3500
A5 3.0 TDI quattro	2007–2011	2,967 cc (181.1 cu in) V6 turbo (CAPA, CCWA)	176 kW (239 PS; 236 hp) at 4000-4400, 500 N⋅m (369 lbf⋅ft) at 1500-3000
A5 3.0 TDI quattro	2011–2015	2,967 cc (181.1 cu in) V6 turbo (CDU, CDUC)	180 kW (245 PS; 241 hp) at 4000-4500, 500 N⋅m (369 lbf⋅ft) at 1400-3250

===== Transmissions =====
Model	Year	Types
Petrol engines
A5 1.8 TFSI Coupé (125 kW)	2007–2008	6-speed manual
A5 1.8 TFSI (118 kW)	2009–2016	6-speed manual, multitronic
A5 2.0 TFSI (132 kW)	2008–2016	6-speed manual, multitronic Cabriolet: multitronic
A5 2.0 TFSI (155 kW)	2008–2016	6-speed manual, multitronic
A5 2.0 TFSI quattro (155 kW)	2008–2016	Coupé: 6-speed manual, 7-speed S tronic, 6-speed Tiptronic, 8-speed Tiptronic; Sportback: 6-speed manual, 7-speed S-Tronic; Cabriolet: 7-speed S-Tronic, 8-speed Tiptronic
S5 3.0 TFSI quattro Cabriolet, Sportback	2009–2016	7-Speed S-Tronic, 6-speed manual
A5 3.2 FSI	2007–2016	multitronic
A5 3.2 FSI quattro	2007–2016	Coupé: 6-speed manual, 6-speed Tiptronic; Sportback: 7-speed S-Tronic; Cabriolet: 7-speed S-Tronic
S5 4.2 FSI quattro Coupé	2007–2016	6-speed manual, 6-speed Tiptronic
RS5 4.2 FSI quattro Coupé	2010–2015	7-speed S-Tronic,
Diesel engines
A5 2.0 TDI Sportback (143PS)	2009–2016	multitronic
A5 2.0 TDIe (100 kW)	2011–2016	6-speed manual
A5 2.0 TDI (105 kW)	2008–2016	6-speed manual
A5 2.0 TDI quattro (125 kW)	2008–2016	6-speed manual
A5 2.0 TDI (130 kW)	2011–2016	6-speed manual and multitronic
A5 2.0 TDI Quattro S Line (130 kW)	2011–2016	6-speed manual and 7-speed S-Tronic
A5 2.7 TDI Coupé and Cabriolet	2007–2016	multitronic
A5 3.0 TDI quattro	2007–2016	Coupé: 6-speed manual, 6-speed Tiptronic, 7-speed S-Tronic (after May 2010); Sportback: 6-speed manual, 7-speed S-Tronic; Cabriolet: 7-speed S-Tronic

In 2009, Audi introduced the seven speed S-Tronic transmission option for A5 with 2.0 TFSI quattro (155 kW) for the UK market, which replaced the six speed Tiptronic in the United Kingdom and Germany.

Beginning with the 2011 model year, the A5 2.0 TFSI Quattro coupé and cabriolet includes 8 speed Tiptronic transmission option, replacing the 6-speed Tiptronic in the U.S. and Canada markets.

For the S5 3.0 TFSI quattro (245 kW), the manual transmission was discontinued for the European market.

===== Equipment =====
The Titanium Package was introduced in the 2011 model year of A5 Coupe, S5 Coupe sold in the U.S.

==== Reception ====
The car was praised for its design, build quality, performance, and all-wheel drive system, and is favorably viewed by the majority of the motoring press. Appraised for a rarely seen example of an excellent all-round niche car. Walter de Silva has said that the Audi A5 coupe is "his most beautiful design ever".

==== Motorsports ====
The Audi A5 3.0 TDI won the Michelin Challenge Bibendum under the Prototypes category.

The Ethanol E100 Coupé clinched overall victory in the Michelin Challenge Bibendum 2010 eco rally over a distance of 350 kilometers.

==== Marketing ====
The television adverts for the A5 Sportback used sound from Audi Sound Studio.

=== 2011 facelift ===
The facelift vehicles, covering A5 Coupé, Convertible, Sportback, S, and RS models, include updated front and rear lights, as well as a new front bumper design. The new front end includes pronounced air inlets, revamped grilles, and flat fog lights. The vehicle is 10 millimetres (0.39 in) longer overall than the predecessor.

Changes to S5 (available as Sportback, Coupé and Cabriolet) include the 3.0 TFSI (333PS) engines on all models, new lights, modified body details, new crystal effect paint finishes, Quattro drive with the crown-gear centre differential, electromechanical power steering, special S sport suspension, standard 18-inch wheels.

The updated vehicles were unveiled at the 2011 Frankfurt Motor Show.

Sales began in Europe in 2011 as 2012 model year vehicles. Early models include A5 1.8 TFSI, A5 2.0 TFSI, A5 3.0 TFSI, S5 3.0 TFSI, 2.0 TDI and 3.0 TDI. The base model is the Audi A5 Sportback 1.8 TFSI.

United States models of A5, S5 went on sale as 2013 model year vehicles.

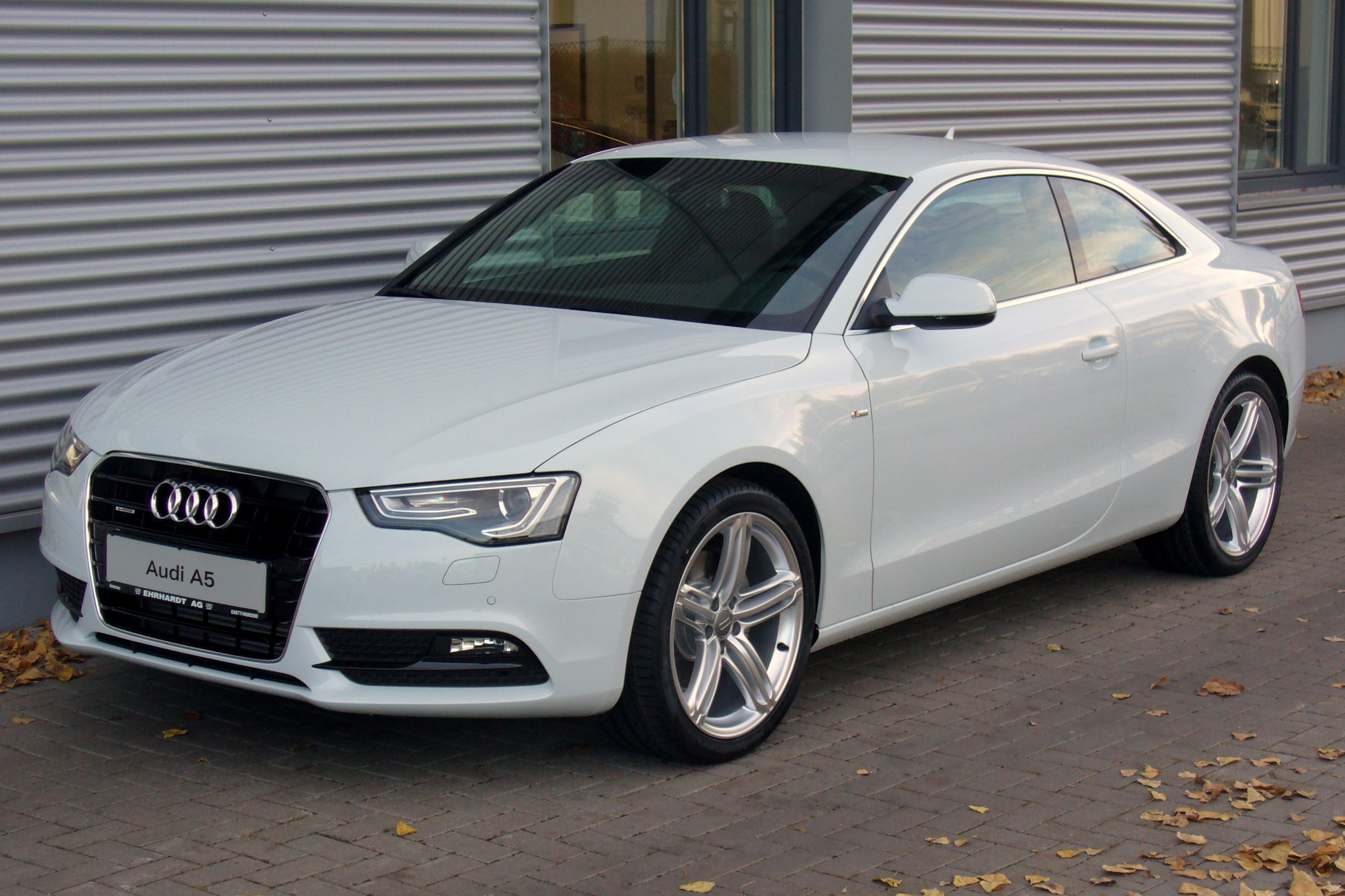
Coupe (facelift)

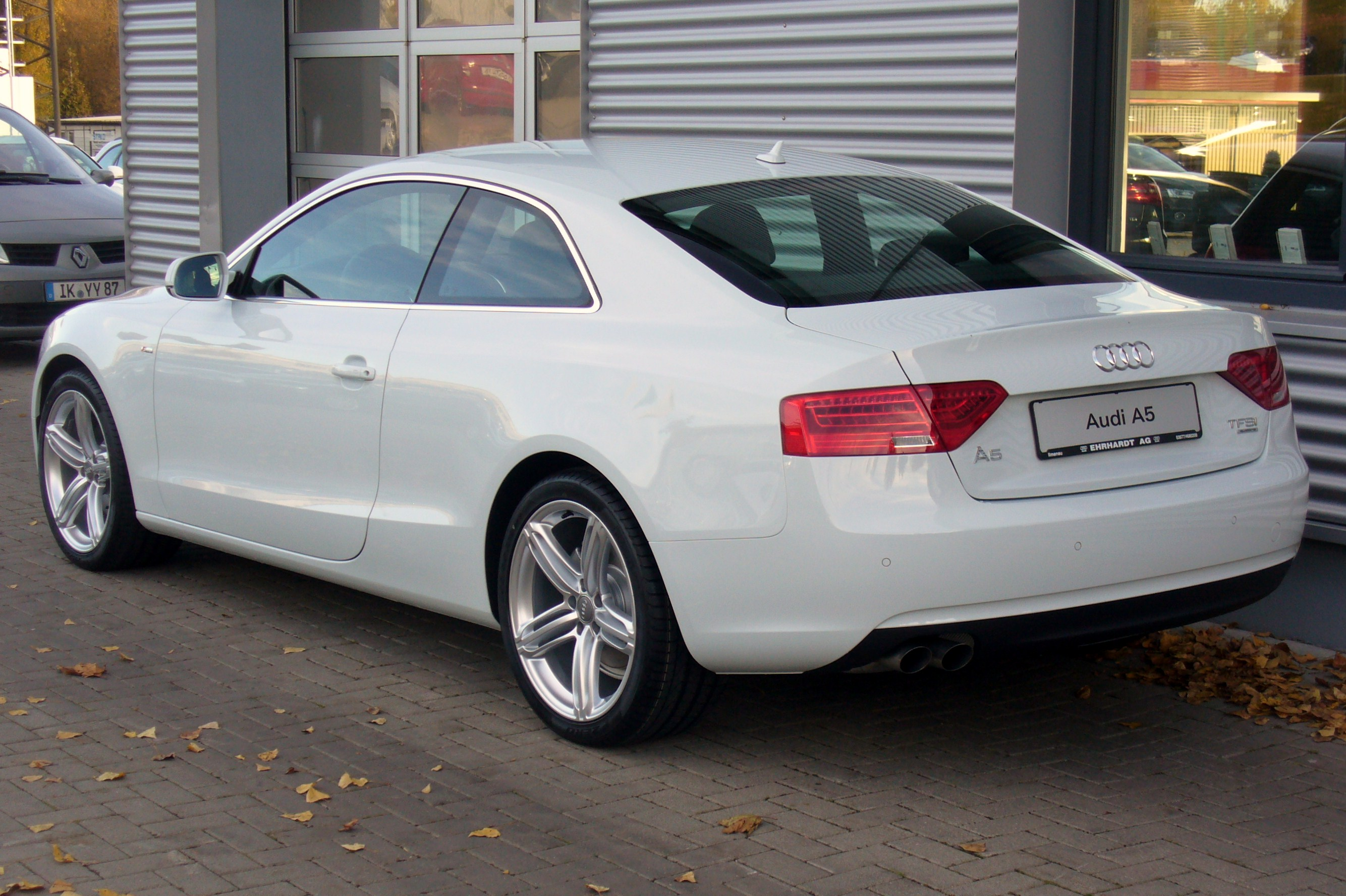
Coupe (facelift)

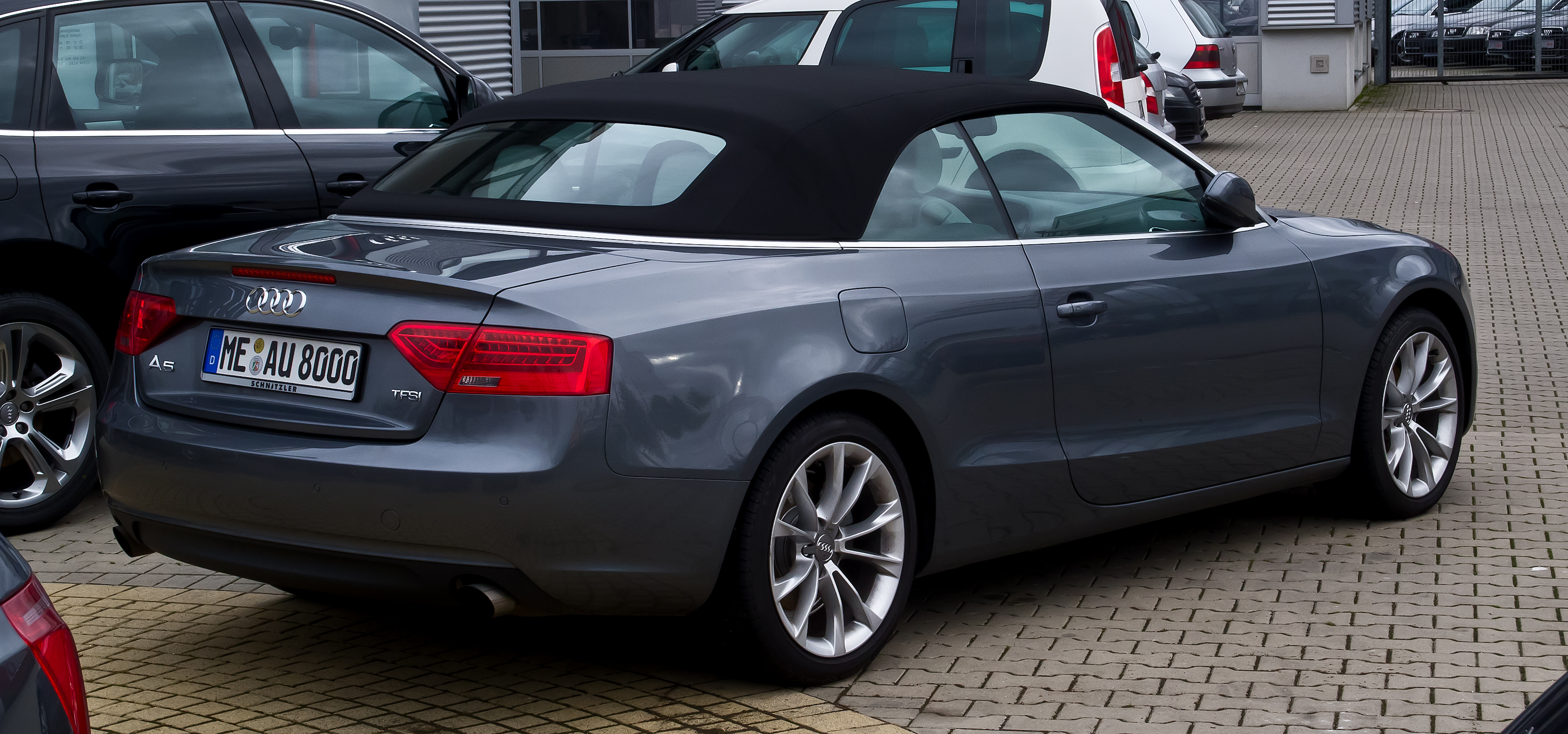
Cabriolet (facelift)

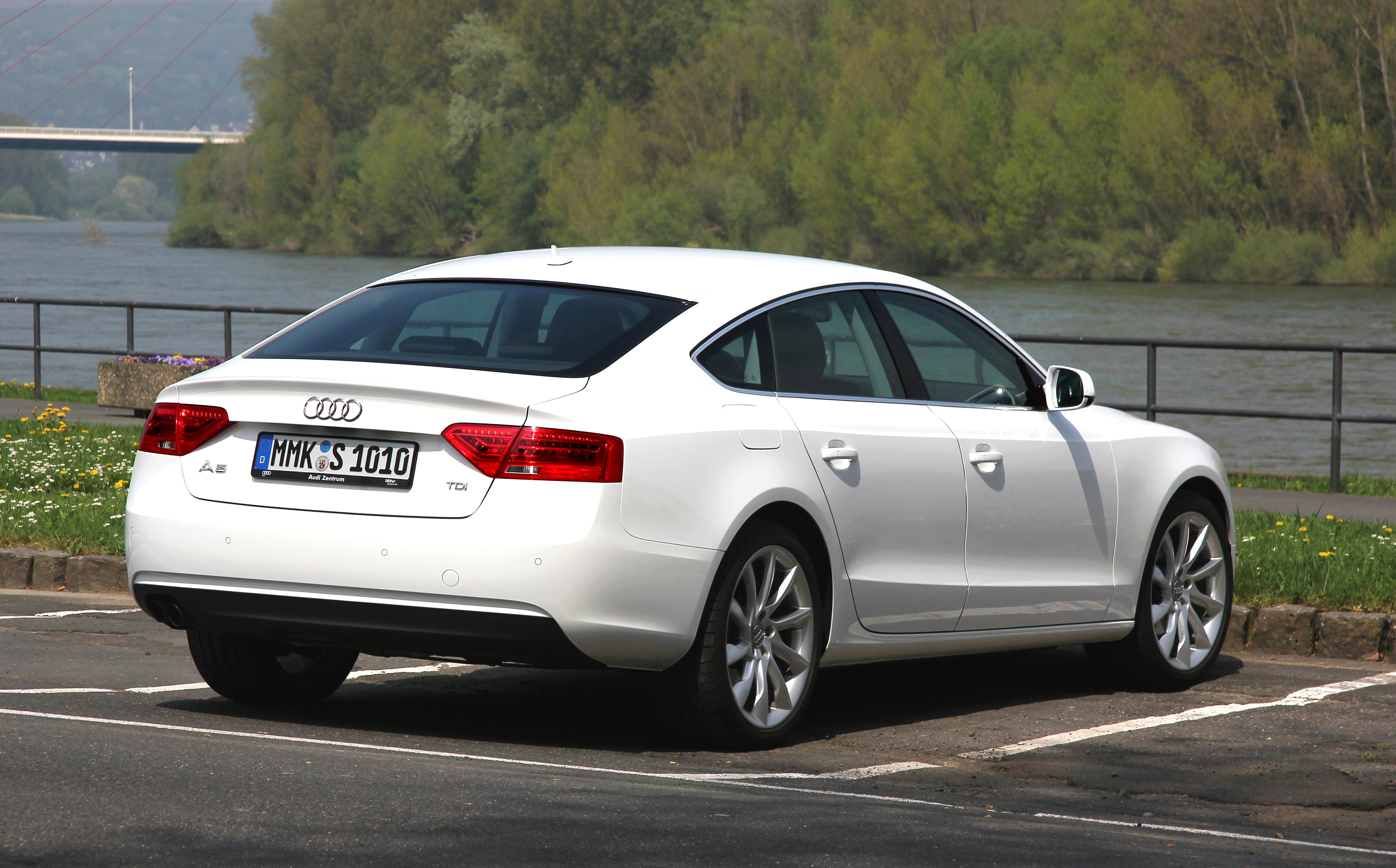
Sportback (facelift)

==== RS5 Coupé (2012) ====
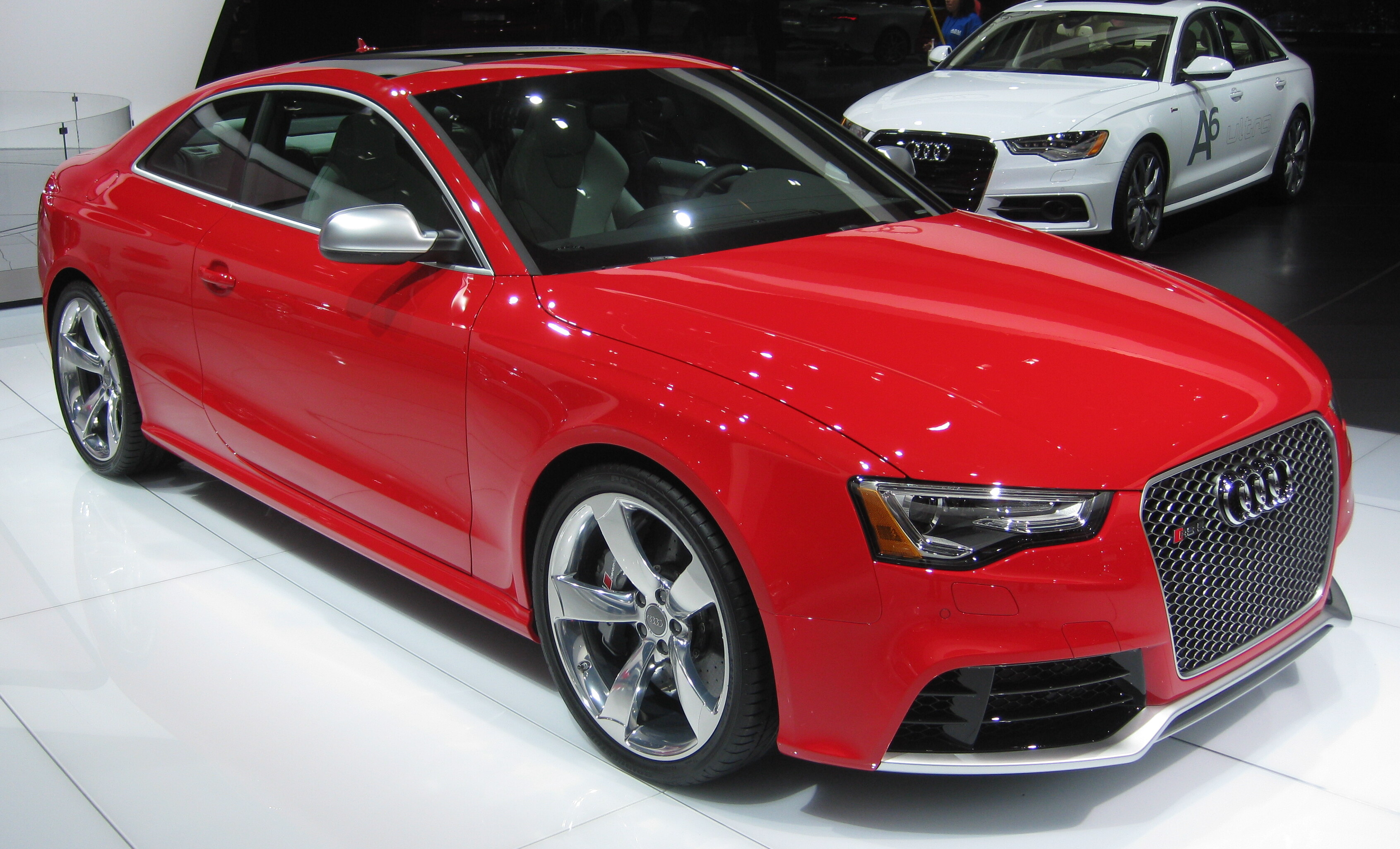
2012 Audi RS5 Coupé

The updated RS5 Coupé was unveiled at the 2011 Frankfurt Motor Show, followed by the 2012 Geneva Motor Show.

Changes to the RS5 Coupé for 2012 included a revised front fascia design featuring new headlights with LED running lights, as well as upgraded dampers and springs on the suspension front, new electric power steering replacing engine-driven hydraulic power steering, exclusive retractable rear spoiler, red cam covers, and a carbon fibre intake manifold, optional piano black trim, twenty-inch graphite-coloured wheels, and a sport exhaust system with black finishers.

==== RS5 Cabriolet (2013) ====
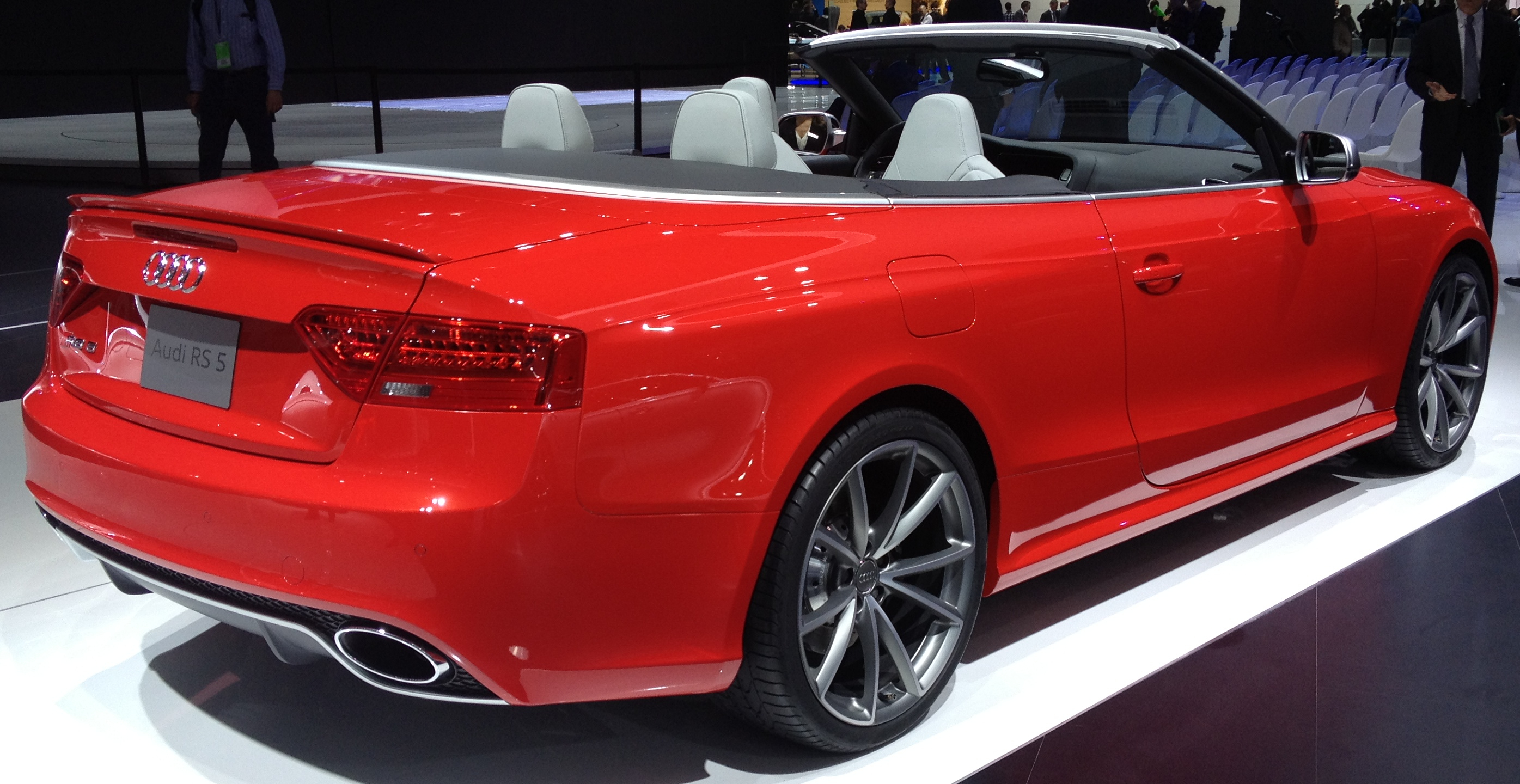
Audi RS5 Cabriolet

The RS5 Cabriolet was unveiled at the 2012 Paris Motor Show. Production of the RS5 ended permanently in June 2015. The RS5 has a naturally aspirated 4.2 V8 that produces 444 hp (331 kW), as well as a valved exhaust, whose note can be tuned to suit driving conditions and personal preference.

Deliveries of the RS5 Cabriolet began in early 2013, and went on sale in the US in April 2013.

==== A5 DTM ====
Codenamed R17, the Audi A5 DTM is a race car designed for the DTM beginning in year 2012, replacing the Audi A4 DTM. It includes a V8 engine rated at 340 kW (462 PS; 456 hp) with a new 6-speed sequential semi-automatic transmission, pneumatically operated suspension using paddle-shifters on the steering wheel, engine electronics (Bosch MS 5.1) and the central display from Audi R8 LMS, larger and wider tires from Hankook, 120-litre (26 imp gal; 32 US gal) safety fuel tank inside a carbon fibre cell, and a larger rear wing. The prototype was built by Audi Sport in Ingolstadt.

The vehicle was unveiled at the 2011 International Motor Show (IAA) in Frankfurt. The homologation of the A5 DTM was scheduled for 1 March 2012.

==== Marketing ====
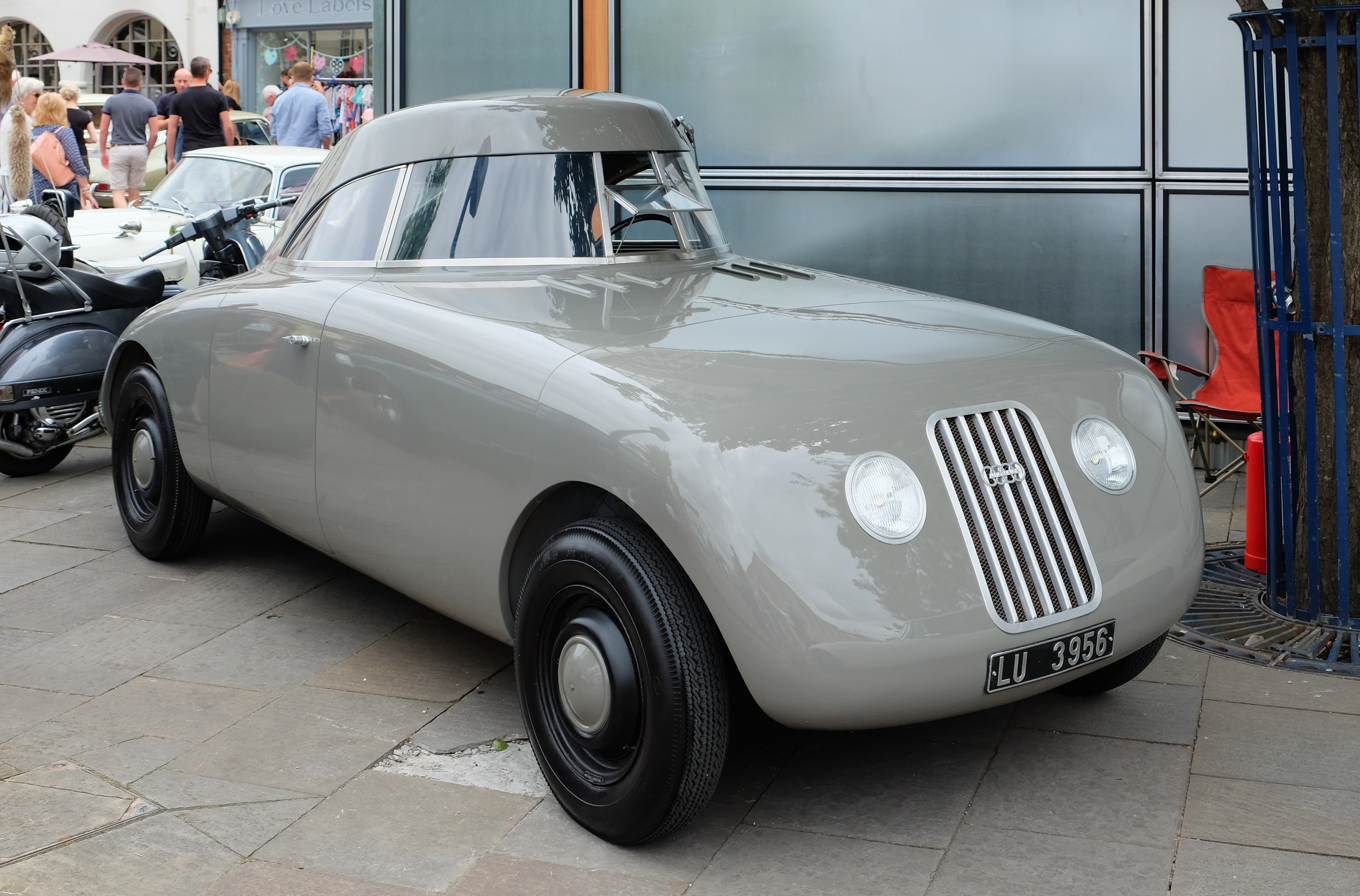
The 'ugly duckling' used in The Swan television advert

As part of the 2012 A5 launch in the United Kingdom, BBH London, Park Pictures, The Whitehouse and The Mill produced a television advert titled 'The Swan' (directed by Joachim Back), inspired by Hans Christian Andersen's tale of 'The Ugly Duckling'. The commercial featured black and white shots of the rebodied 1920 Audi concept car designed by Audi engineer Paul Jaray, trawling the streets of a sleepy Bavarian village, the streamlined model gets shunned by disapproving locals not taking too well to the new aerodynamic design. After retiring in a nearby forest, the 'ugly' car transforms into the new Audi A5, metaphorically becoming the 'beautiful' white swan. The soundtrack features Danny Kaye singing the children's classic Ugly Duckling.

=== 2013 update ===
==== A5 (2013) ====
Changes to the Audi A5 Sportback include forced induction and direct injection on all engine models, standard start-stop-system; optional sport differential on the 3.0 TDI Quattro, and 3.0 TFSI Quattro, optional MMI navigation plus.

Changes to A5 Cabriolet include optional neck-level heating, special coating for optional leather seats.

==== S5 (2013) ====
Available in Sportback, Coupé, Cabriolet bodies, it includes 3.0 TFSI engine rated 333 PS (245 kW; 328 hp) and 440 N⋅m (325 ft⋅lbf), seven-speed S-Tronic transmission, S sport suspension, electronically controlled shock absorbers, dynamic steering, optional Audi drive select, 18-inch aluminium wheels.

==== RS 5 Coupé, RS 5 Cabriolet ====
Available in Coupé and Cabriolet bodies, it is a version of A5 with 4.2 FSI engine rated at 450 PS (331 kW; 444 hp) and 430 N⋅m (317 ft⋅lbf), seven-speed S-Tronic transmission, quattro permanent all-wheel drive system with crown-gear centre differential and torque vectoring (optional quattro with sport differential rear axle), 20 mm (0.79 in) lower body, electromechanical power steering, exclusive 19-inch forged alloy wheels, optional carbon fibre-ceramic brake discs, Audi drive select dynamics system, optional RS sport suspension with Dynamic Ride Control (DRC).

=== Litigation ===
Audi had problems with the oil consumption in the engines of the models between 2009 and 2011. More than 200 car owners in Switzerland were affected as well. In Switzerland, cars with less than 100,000 kilometres (62,000 mi) and below five years old can have the hardware replaced and paid for by Audi. If the car is between 100,000 and 200,000 kilometres (62,000 and 124,000 mi) and below five years, Audi fully pays the hardware but only half of the work.

== Second generation (2016) ==
Second generation
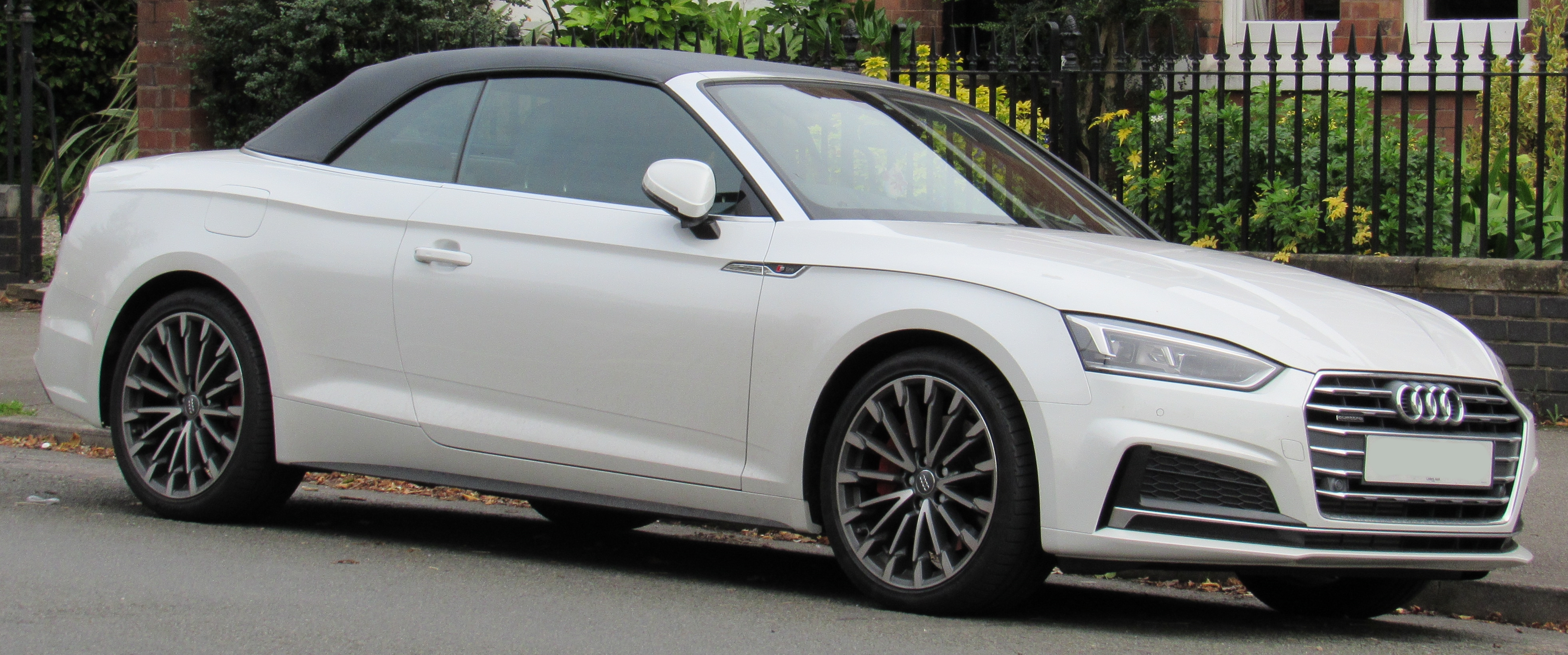

Overview
- Model code: F5
- Production: June 2016 – 2024
- Model years: 2018–2024 (coupe and cabriolet); 2018–2025 (sportback)
- Assembly: Germany: Ingolstadt (Coupe & Sportback); Germany: Neckarsulm (Cabriolet)
- Designer: Jakob Hirzel

Body and chassis
- Body style: 2-door coupé; 2-door convertible; 4-door liftback sedan
- Platform: Volkswagen Group MLBevo platform
- Related: Audi A4 (B9)

Powertrain
- Engine: Petrol: 1.4 L EA211 TFSI I4 16V 152 (35 TFSI); 2.0 L EA888 TFSI I4 + Mild Hybrid 48V 190 (40 TFSI / 40 TFSI S-Line); 2.0L TFSI + CNG I4 170 (g-Tron); 2.0 L EA888 CDLA TFSI I4 + Mild Hybrid 48V 252 (45 TFSI/45 TFSI Quattro); 2.9 L BiTurbo TFSI V6 450 (RS5); 3.0 L TFSI V6 355 (S5); Diesel: 2.0 L TDI I4 190; 3.0 L V6 TDI 220; 3.0 L V6 TDI 290
- Transmission: 6-speed manual 7-speed S-Tronic dual-clutch automatic 8-speed tiptronic automatic (A5 3.0 TDI & S5 & RS5)
- Hybrid drivetrain: MHEV

Dimensions
- Wheelbase: A5 Coupé & Cabriolet: 2,764 mm (108.8 in); S5 Coupé: 2,765 mm (108.9 in); A5 Sportback: 2,824 mm (111.2 in); S5 Sportback: 2,825 mm (111.2 in)
- Length: A5 Coupé & Cabriolet: 4,673–4,697 mm (184.0–184.9 in); S5 Coupé: 4,673–4,697 mm (184.0–184.9 in); A5 Sportback: 4,733 mm (186.3 in); S5 Sportback: 4,752 mm (187.1 in)
- Width: A5 & S5 Coupé: 1,846 mm (72.7 in); A5 & S5 Sportback: 1,843 mm (72.6 in)
- Height: A5 Coupé: 1,371 mm (54.0 in); S5 Coupé: 1,368 mm (53.9 in); A5 Sportback: 1,386 mm (54.6 in); S5 Sportback: 1,384 mm (54.5 in)

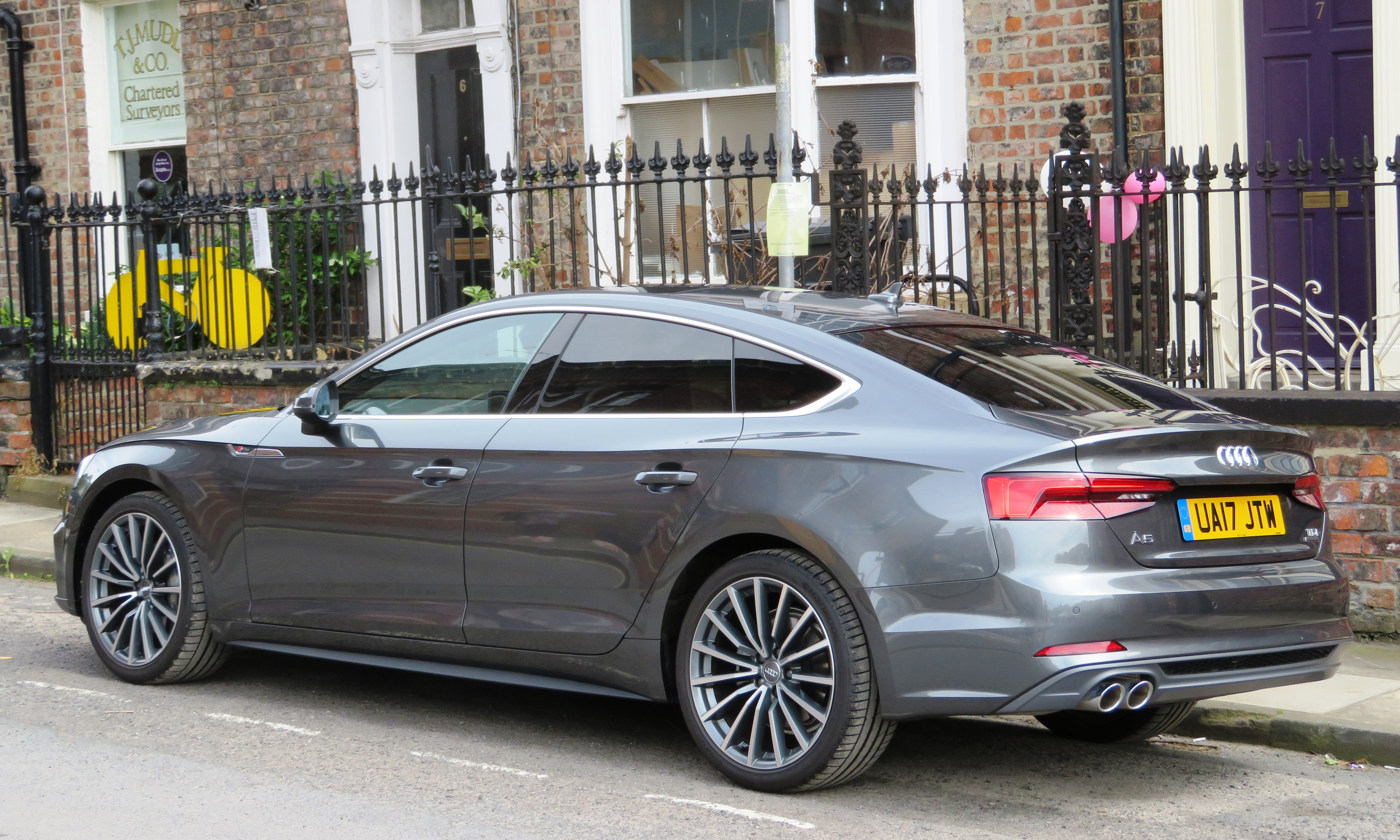
Audi A5 Sportback 3.0 TDI quattro (UK)

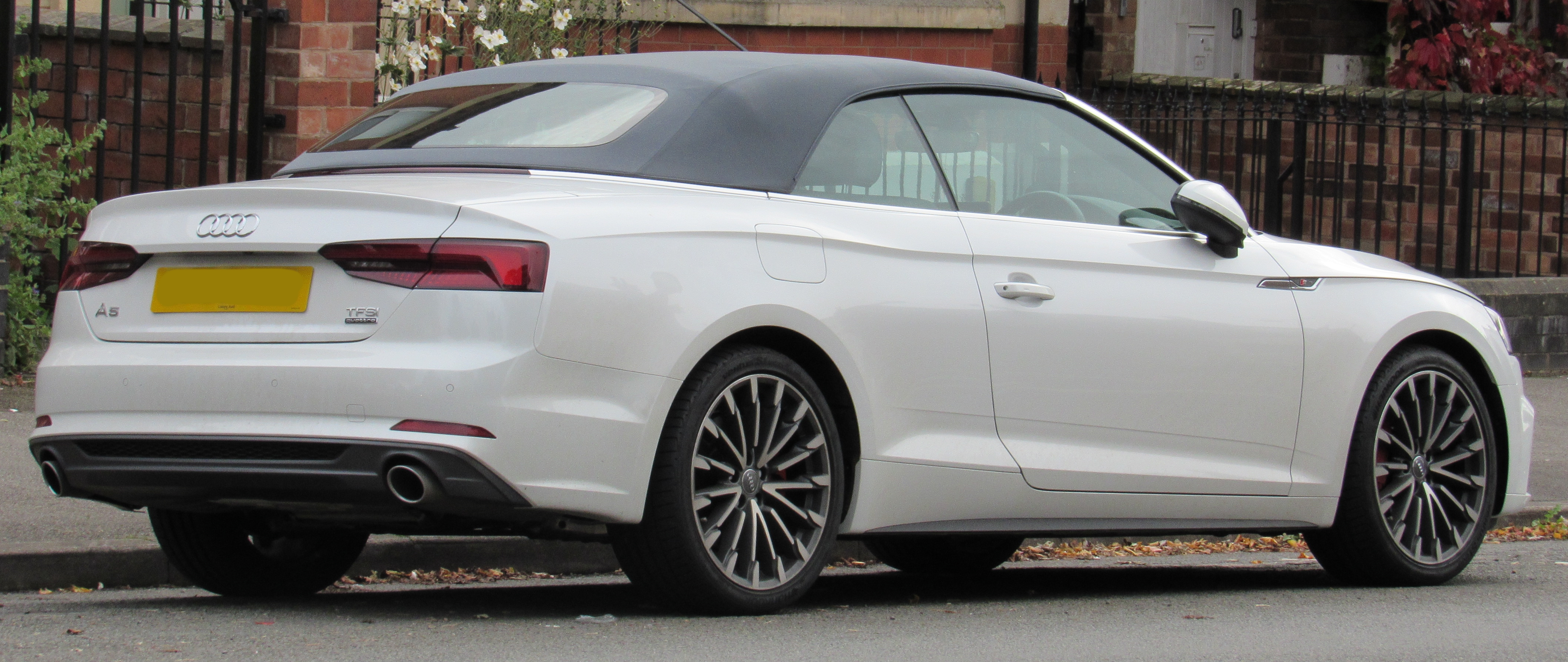
Audi A5 Cabriolet 2.0 S Line quattro (UK)

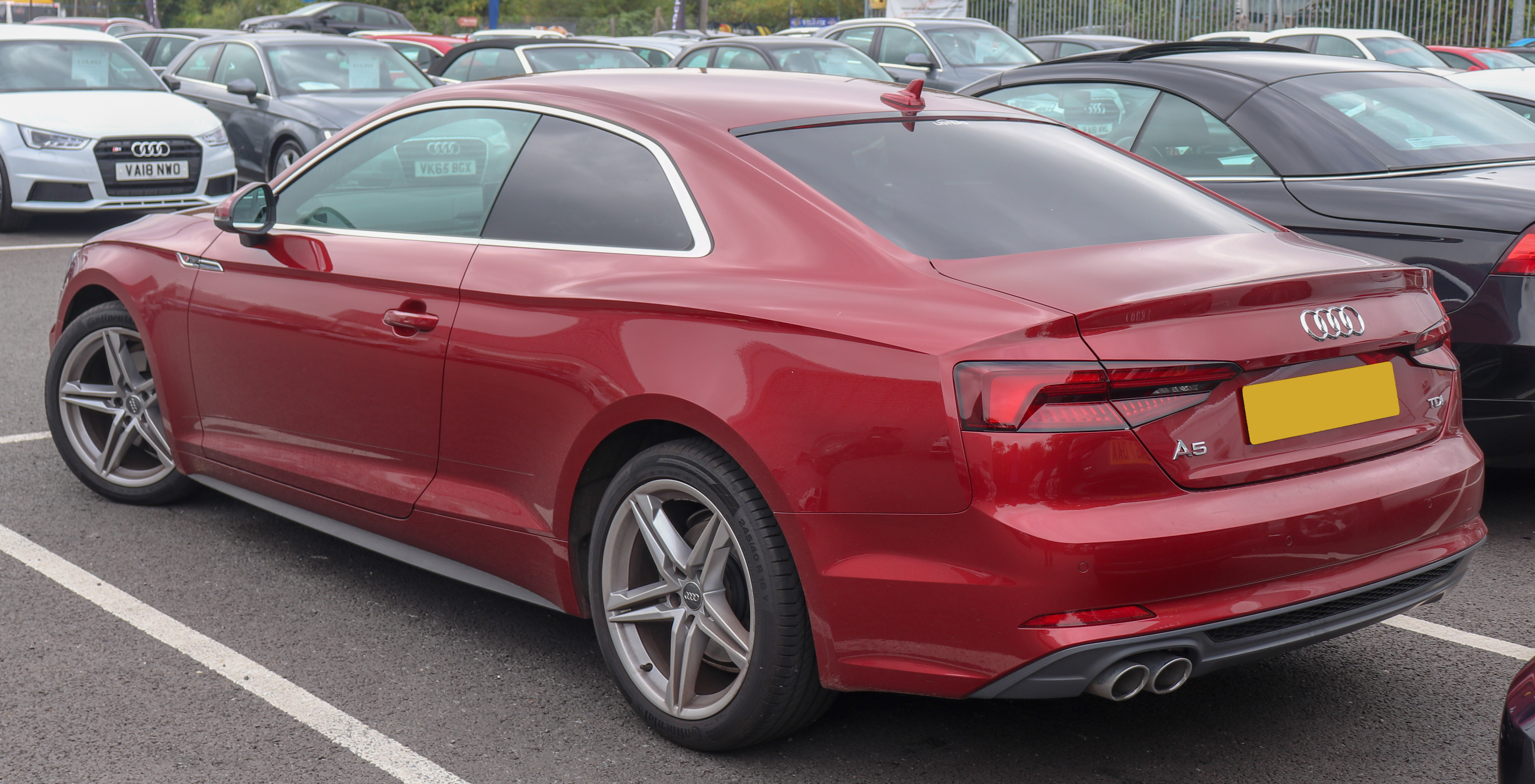
Audi A5 Coupé S-Line TDi (UK)

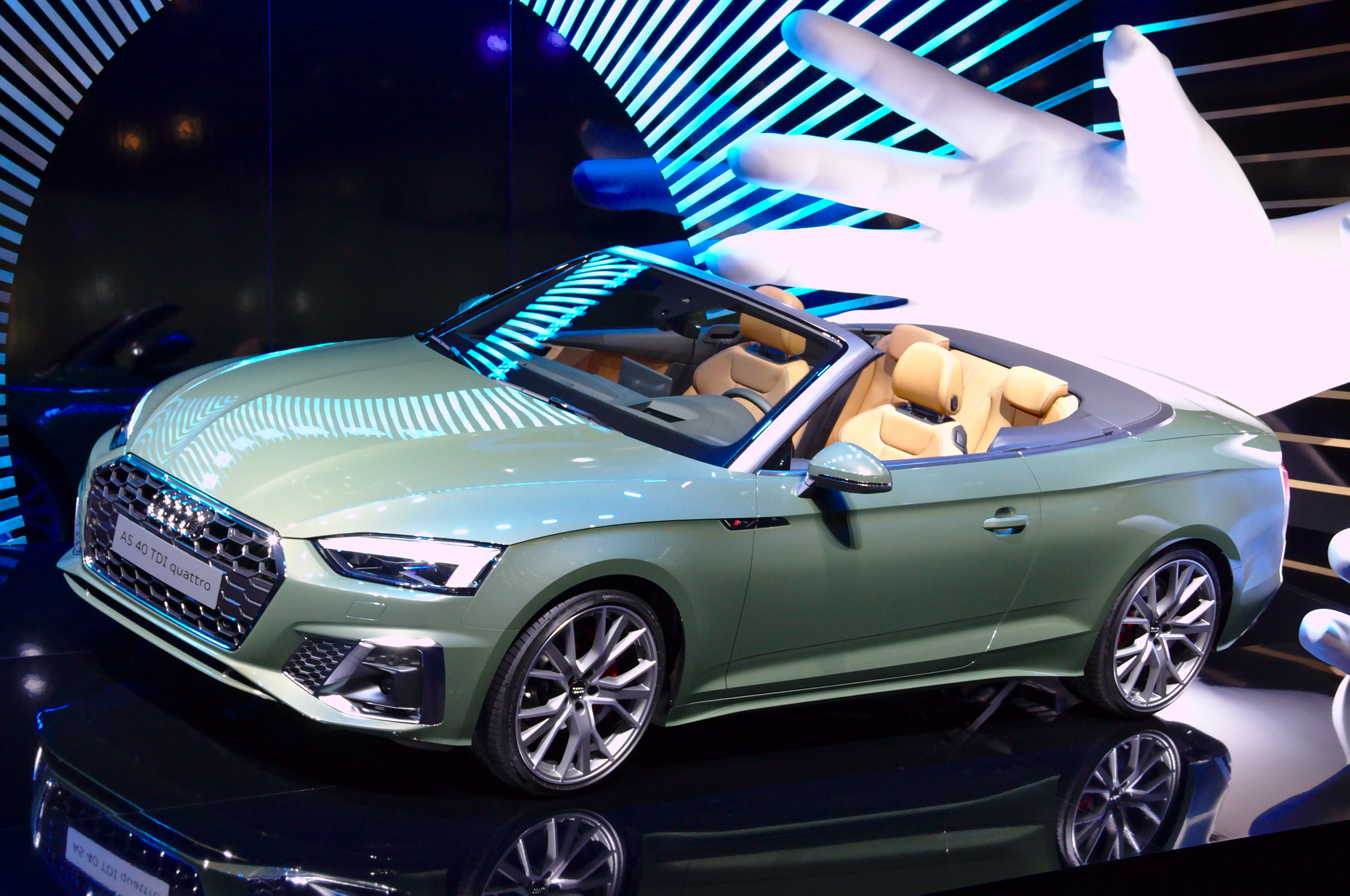
Audi A5 Cabriolet Facelift (Germany)

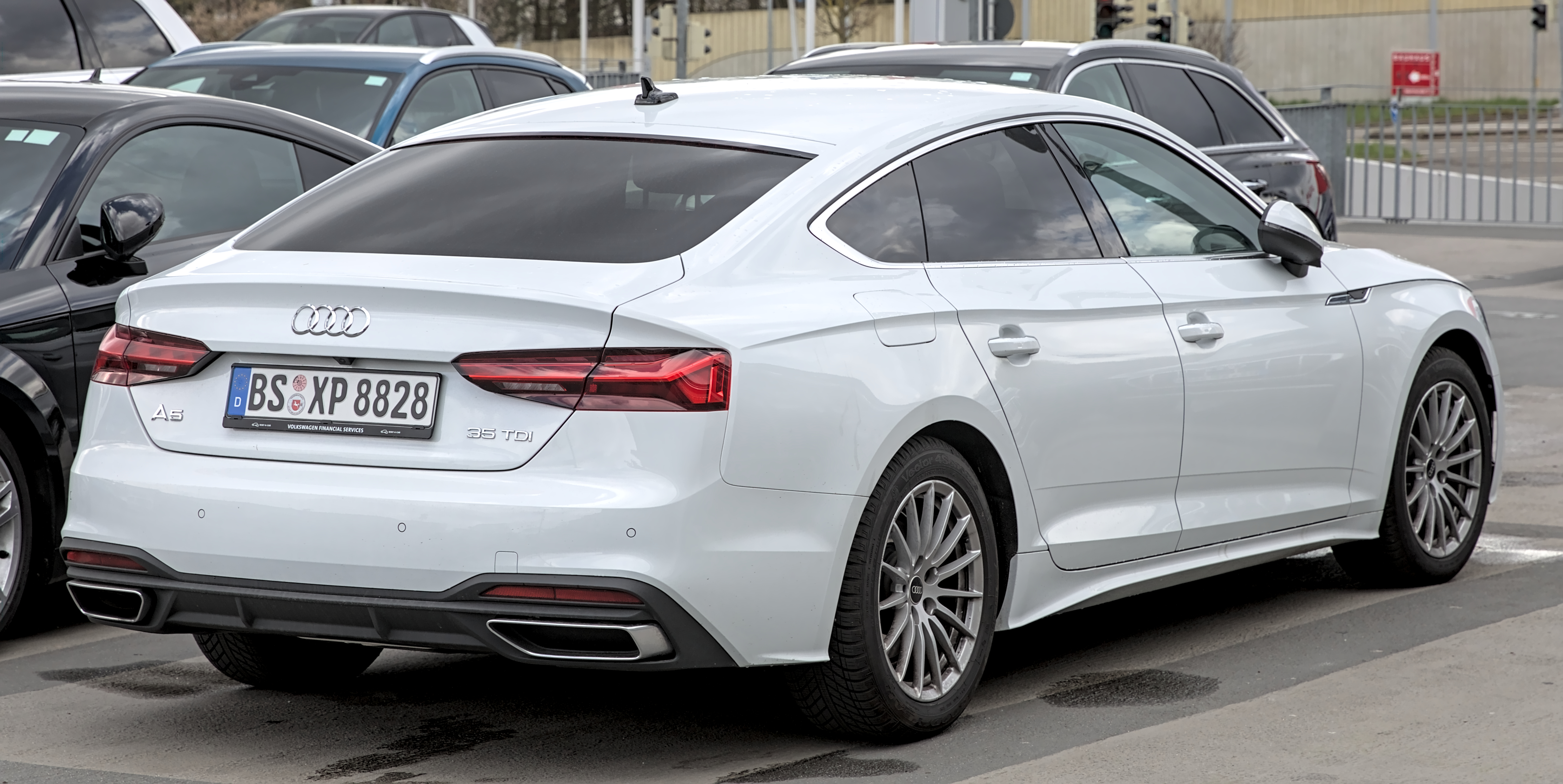
Audi A5 Sportback Facelift (Germany)

The second-generation A5 and S5 Coupé, based on the ninth generation of the Volkswagen Group MLB Platform, were unveiled on 2 June 2016. Two petrol and two diesel engines are offered for the A5. The petrol engines are 2.0 litre TFSI with either 140 kW (190 PS; 188 hp) or 185 kW (252 PS; 248 hp), and the diesel motors are 2.0 TDI and 3.0 TDI, with 140 kW (190 PS; 188 hp) or 210 kW (286 PS; 282 hp). All the 2.0-litre powerplants can be paired with a 6-speed manual gearbox (in certain countries only), or a 7/8-speed S Tronic/Tiptronic, which is standard on the 3.0 TDI. The A5 features the Virtual Cockpit instrument panel, an edge-to-edge display behind the steering wheel inspired by the airplane cockpit. The factory option for the A5 is the S line package which consists of a sportier front bumper with an aluminium line, diffuser on the rear bumper, and S line badges on the front fenders and side panel.

The A5 and S5 Sportback were unveiled on 8 September 2016. They are powered by the same engines as the A5 and S5 Coupé respectively.

The A5 and S5 Cabriolet were unveiled on 3 November 2016.

=== S5 ===
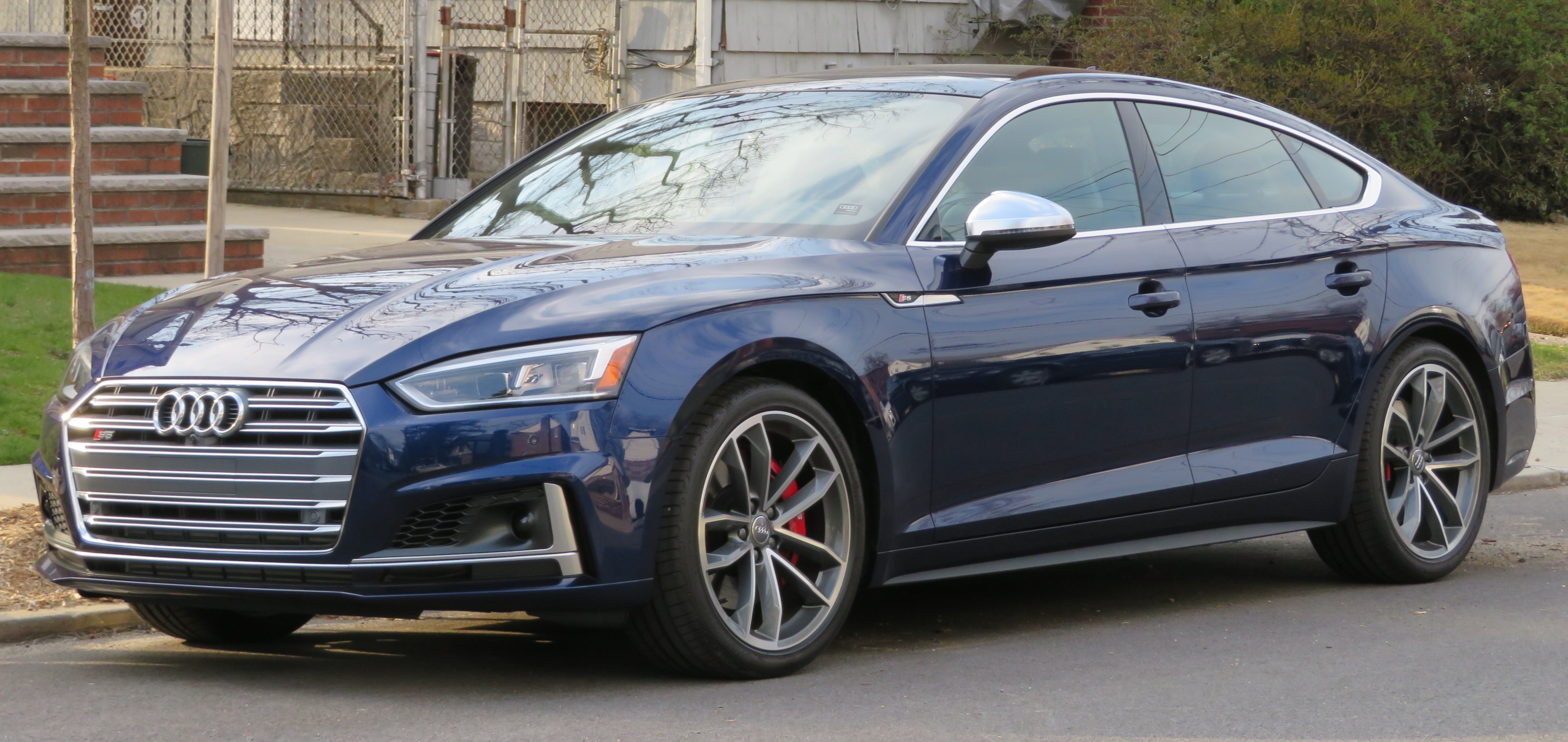
Audi S5 Sportback quattro (USA)

The S5 is powered by a turbocharged 260 kW (354 PS; 349 hp) 3.0-litre TFSI engine that worked with an 8-speed automatic transmission. Inside, the S5 has standard front bucket seats with diamond-shaped stitching, and a flat-bottom steering wheel with S badging.

=== RS5 ===
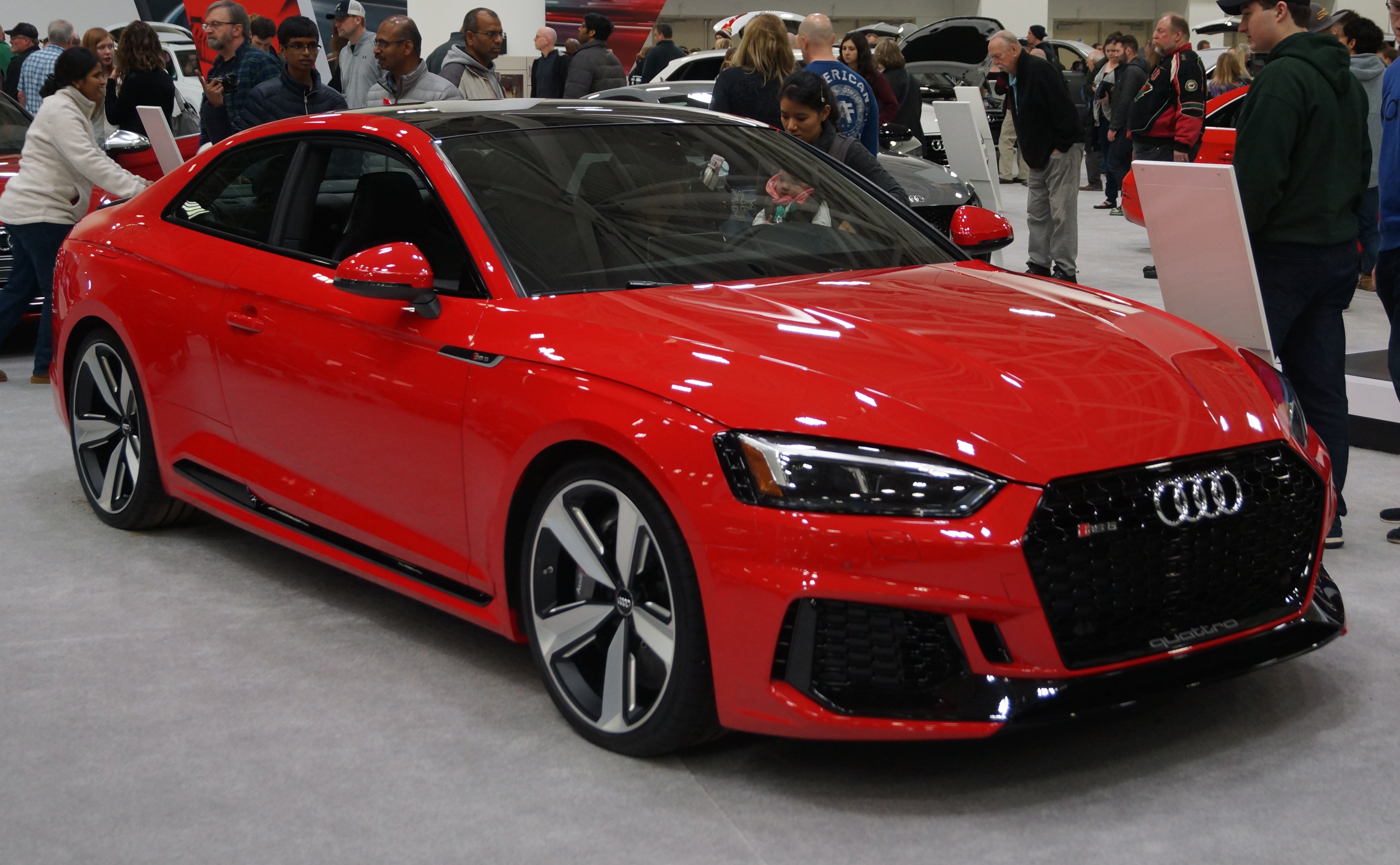
2018 Audi RS5 Coupé finished in Misano Red (pre-facelift)

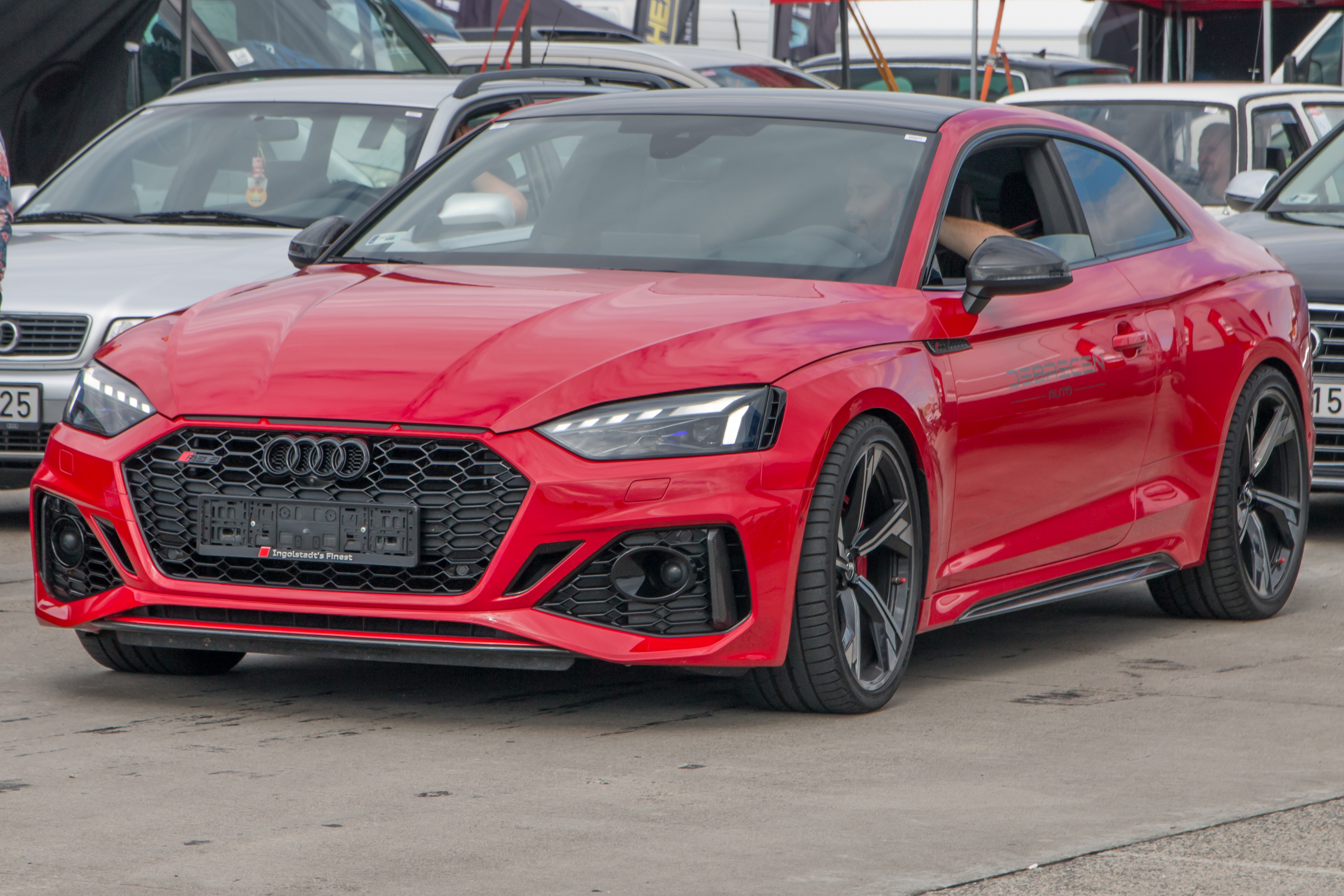
Audi RS5 Coupé (facelift)

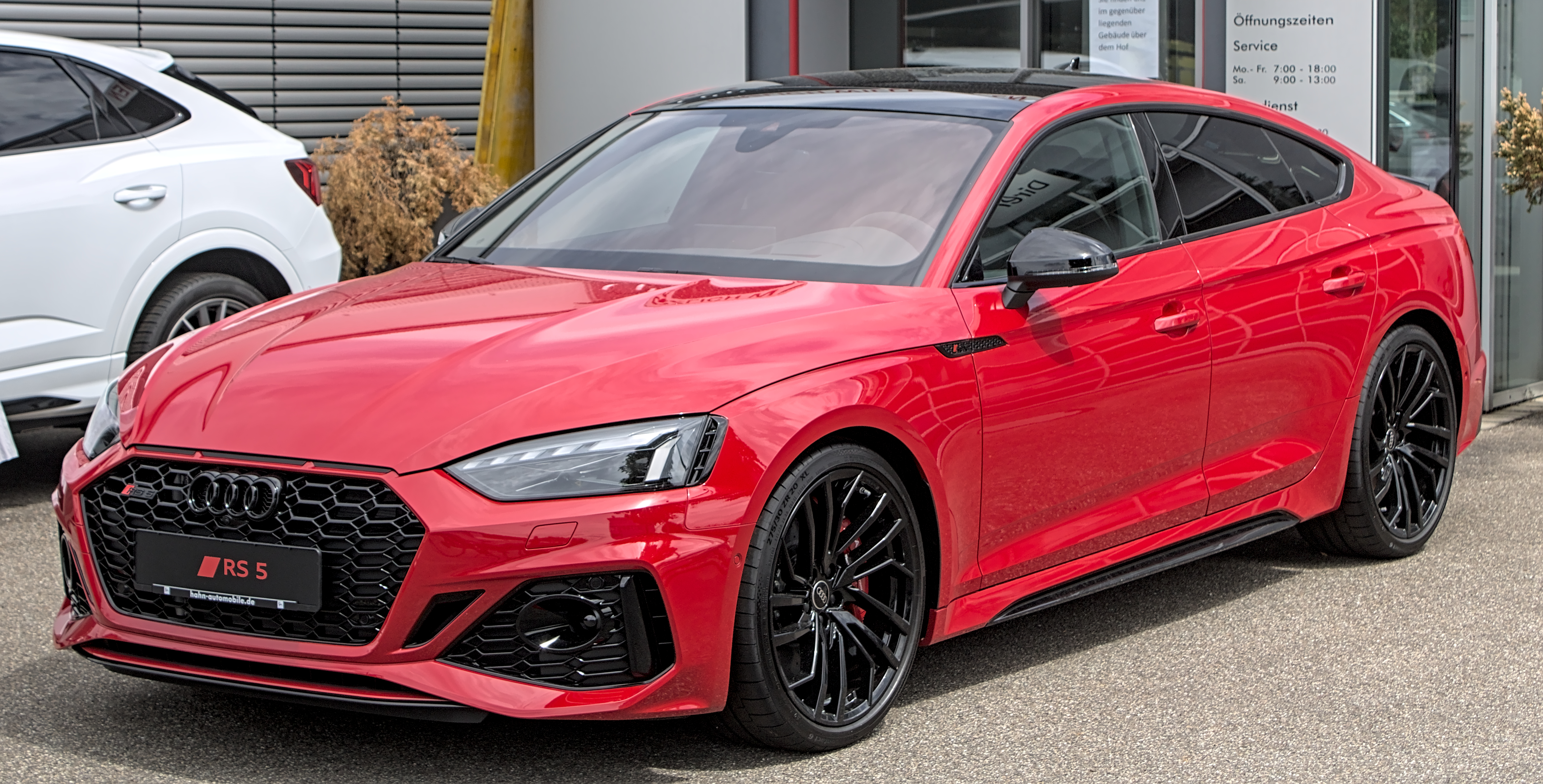
Audi RS5 Sportback (facelift)

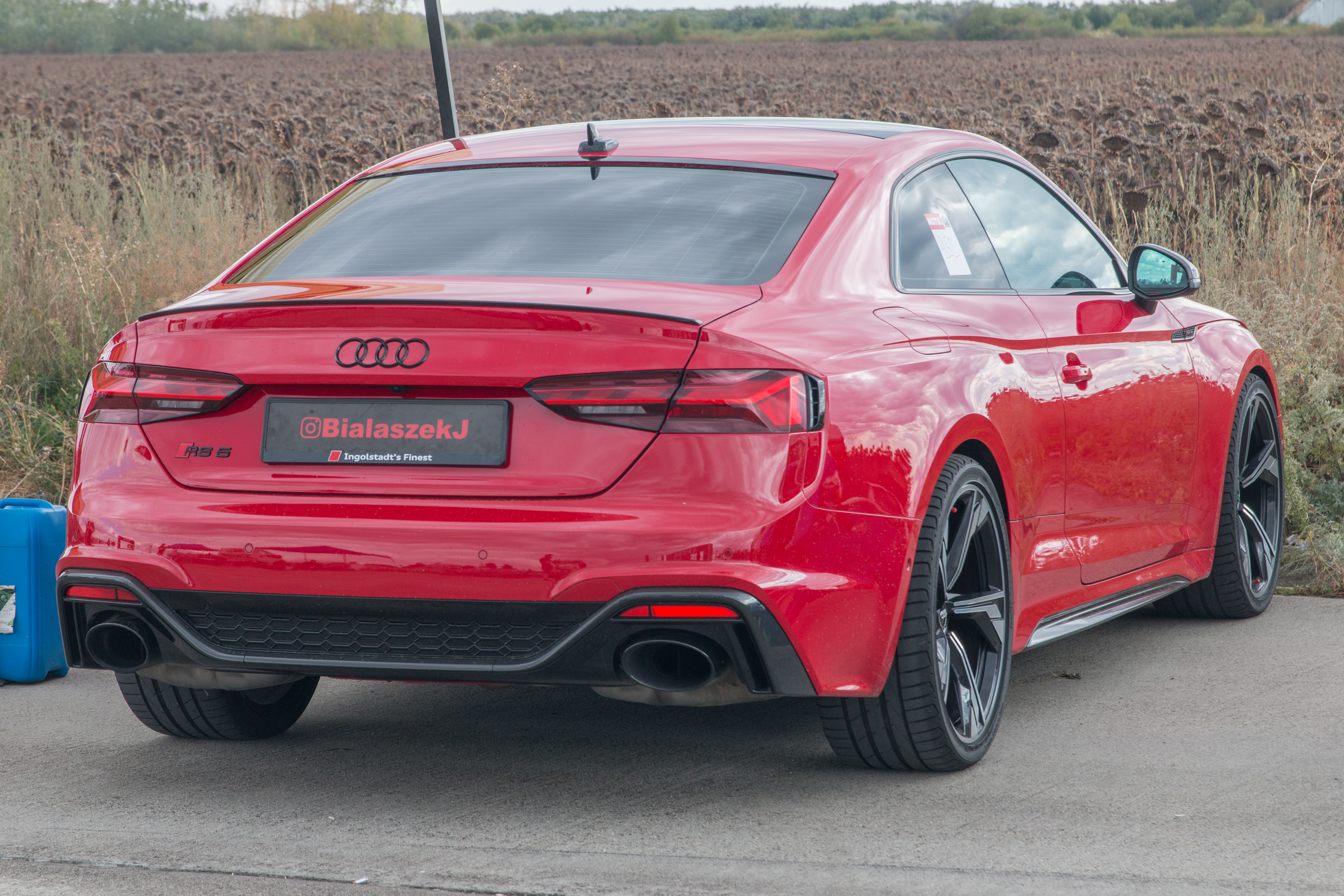
Audi RS5 Coupé (facelift)

The RS 5 Coupé is powered by a 2.9-litre TFSI V6 twin turbo engine producing 331 kW (450 PS; 444 hp) and 600 N⋅m (443 lb⋅ft) of torque, that is also used in the Panamera 4S. It is 60 kg (132 lb) lighter than its predecessor. Power is delivered to the quattro system through an 8-speed automatic transmission. The RS 5 accelerates from 0–100 km/h (0–62 mph) in 3.9 seconds, with a top speed of 280 km/h (174 mph). It also comes with a honeycomb grille, wider fenders, and aggressively styled front bumper with bigger openings than the A5 and S5.

Further developments include a new chassis featuring a five-link front and rear suspension coupled to Audi Sport's Dynamic Ride Control system offering variable damping control. Other options included a carbon-fibre engine cover and ceramic front brakes.

The RS 5 Sportback was unveiled at the 2018 New York Auto Show.

The RS 5 facelift was unveiled on 10 December 2019.

Special editions

Panther edition

Audi released a limited run of 100 "Panther Edition" RS5s (75 Sportback and 25 Coupe) in late 2019, designed by Audi of America Product Planner, Anthony Garbis. The Panther edition package retailed for $13,800 and included several exclusive options, most notably: Panther Black crystal effect paint, an Alcantara flat-bottom steering wheel, 20-inch 5-twin-spoke edge design wheels and Crescendo Red stitching on the seats, steering wheel and seat belts.

=== Safety ===
ANCAP test results* Audi A5 coupe & Sportback variants (2015, aligned with Euro NCAP)
Test	Points	%
Overall:	5 /5 stars	
Adult occupant:	34	89%
Child occupant:	43	87%
Pedestrian:	27.3	75%
Safety assist:	9.9	75%

== Third generation (2024) ==
Third generation
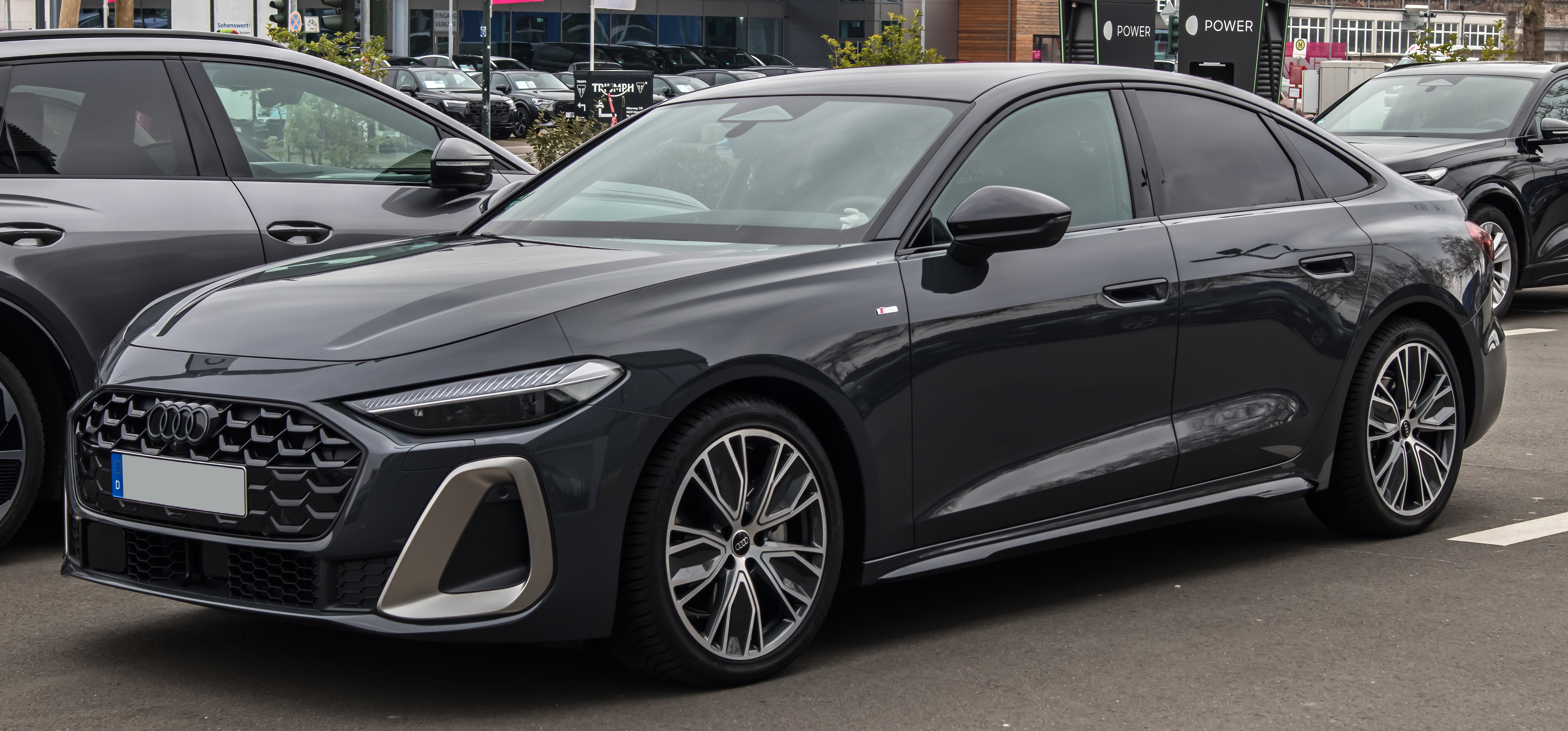
- A5 B10 S-line

Overview
- Model code: B10
- Production: August 2024 – present
- Model years: 2025–present
- Assembly: Germany: Neckarsulm; China: Changchun (FAW-VW, A5L Sedan) Shanghai (SAIC-VW, A5L Sportback)
- Designer: Jakob Hirzel; Ramon Bäurle (interior designer)

Body and chassis
- Body style: 5-door liftback (A5, A5L sportback); 4-door sedan (A5L sedan); 5-door station wagon (Avant)
- Platform: Premium Platform Combustion (PPC)

Powertrain
- Engine: Petrol: 2.0 L EA888 I4 turbo (MHEV); 3.0 L EA839 V6 turbo (MHEV); Petrol-PHEV: 2.0 L EA888 I4 turbo (CDL) (e-hybrid); 2.9 L EA839TT twin-turbocharged V6 (RS5); Diesel: 2.0 L EA288 evo I4 turbo (MHEV)
- Electric motor: 48-volt main electrical system (MHEV); Permanent-magnet electric motor (e-hybrid)
- Transmission: 7-speed dual-clutch; 7-speed S tronic dual-clutch automatic (e-hybrid)
- Hybrid drivetrain: Mild hybrid 48V; PHEV (e-hybrid)
- Battery: 25.9 kWh Li-ion (e-hybrid)
- Electric range: 72 km (45 mi) (e-hybrid)

Dimensions
- Wheelbase: 2,900 mm (114.2 in); 2,969 mm (116.9 in) (A5L sedan); 2,922 mm (115.0 in) (A5L sportback)
- Length: 4,829 mm (190.1 in); 4,908 mm (193.2 in) (A5L sedan); 4,903 mm (193.0 in) (A5L sportback)
- Width: 1,860 mm (73.2 in); 1,883 mm (74.1 in) (A5L sportback)
- Height: 1,440 mm (56.7 in); 1,442 mm (56.8 in) (A5L sedan); 1,427 mm (56.2 in) (A5L sportback)
- Kerb weight: 1,770–2,040 kg (3,902–4,497 lb)

Chronology
- Predecessor: Audi A4 (B9); Audi A5 Sportback (F5)

On 16 July 2024, Audi replaced the A4/S4 Saloon and Avant with the third-generation A5/S5 as part of Audi's new strategy of allocating even numbers to electric vehicles and odd numbers to combustion cars.

Coupé and convertible models are no longer offered for the third generation line-up. The saloon is equipped with a liftback and thus replaces both the A4 saloon and the A5 Sportback of the previous generation. The 'Avant' estate is still available. The A5 became available to order in July 2024, with deliveries beginning in European countries in November 2024.

The A5 B10 is the first model based on the Premium Platform Combustion (PPC). Like all other vehicles based on the PPC and PPE, it uses the E^{3} 1.2 software platform developed by Volkswagen subsidiary Cariad.

The liftback model has styling cues of a coupé with a sloped roofline and the tailgate design evokes the brand's Sportback models. The Avant model has a roofline which merges into the integrated roof spoiler that extends into the rear window and the raked D-pillars. The front has a wide single-frame grille with a 3D honeycomb structure, derived from Audi Sport. On the side, there are marked wheel arches which evoke the Quattro all-wheel drive system and are inspired by the Audi Ur-four. The rear features a light bar that seamlessly connects the light clusters and the bottom part has rectangular exhaust pipes

For exterior lighting, the headlights features LED daytime running lights, and the rear lights feature Audi's second generation of OLED technology. The OLED rear light clusters are also used as communication lighting by enabling Car-to-X interaction and alert road users behind. The front and rear lights have dynamic lighting effects when unlocking and leaving the vehicle and optional digital lighting signatures.

According to Audi, the interior design of the A5 is based on four key characteristics: a 'human-centric' design, a 'Digital Stage', 'Material Driven Design', and 'Visual Clarity'. The Audi MMI panoramic display has a curved design and uses OLED technology. It consists of the 11.9-inch Audi virtual cockpit digital gauge cluster, the 14.5-inch MMI touchscreen infotainment system, and the optional 10.9-inch MMI front passenger display. The A5 is available with a configurable head-up display; and, for the first time, drivers have the option to control the infotainment and other vehicle functions via the heads-up display.

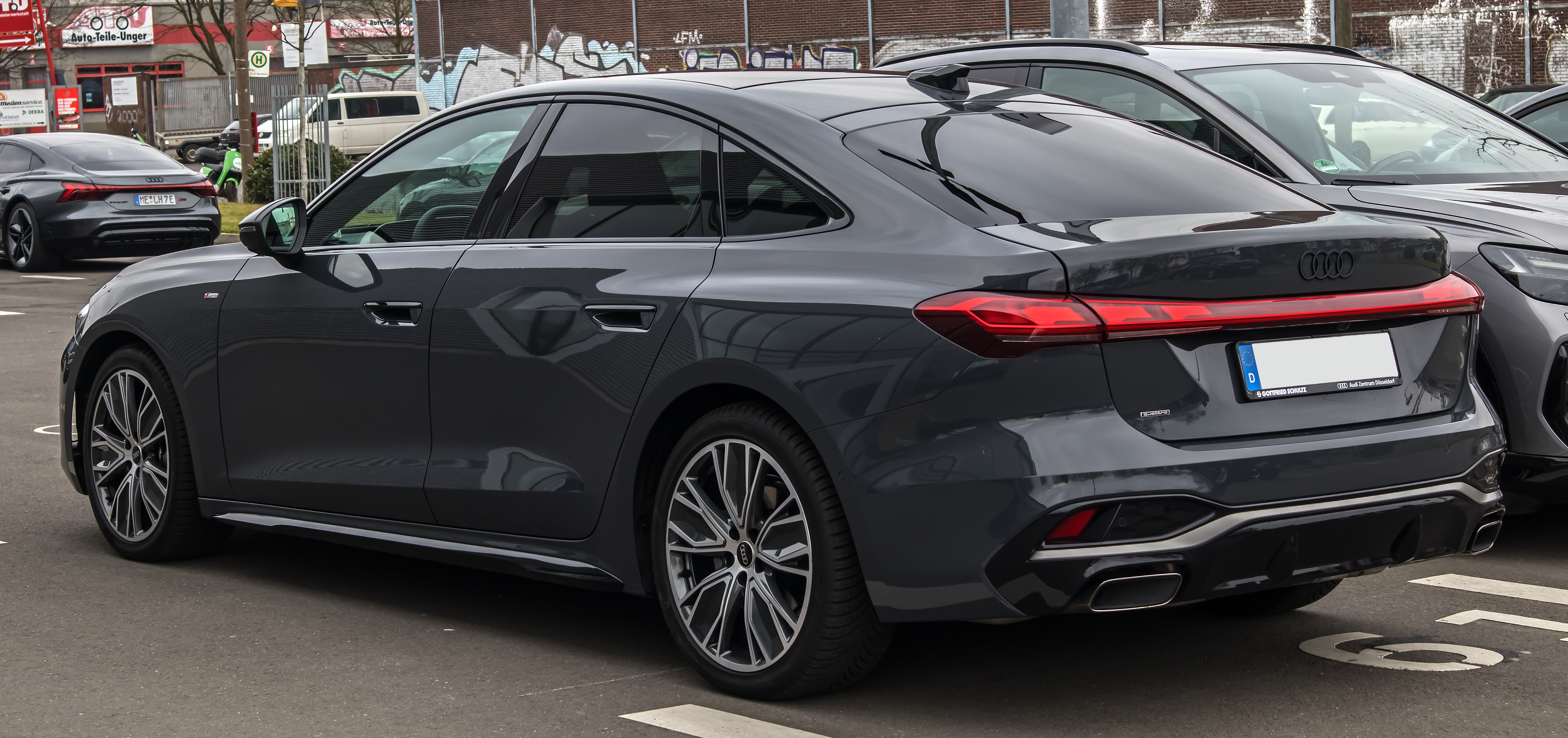
Rear view

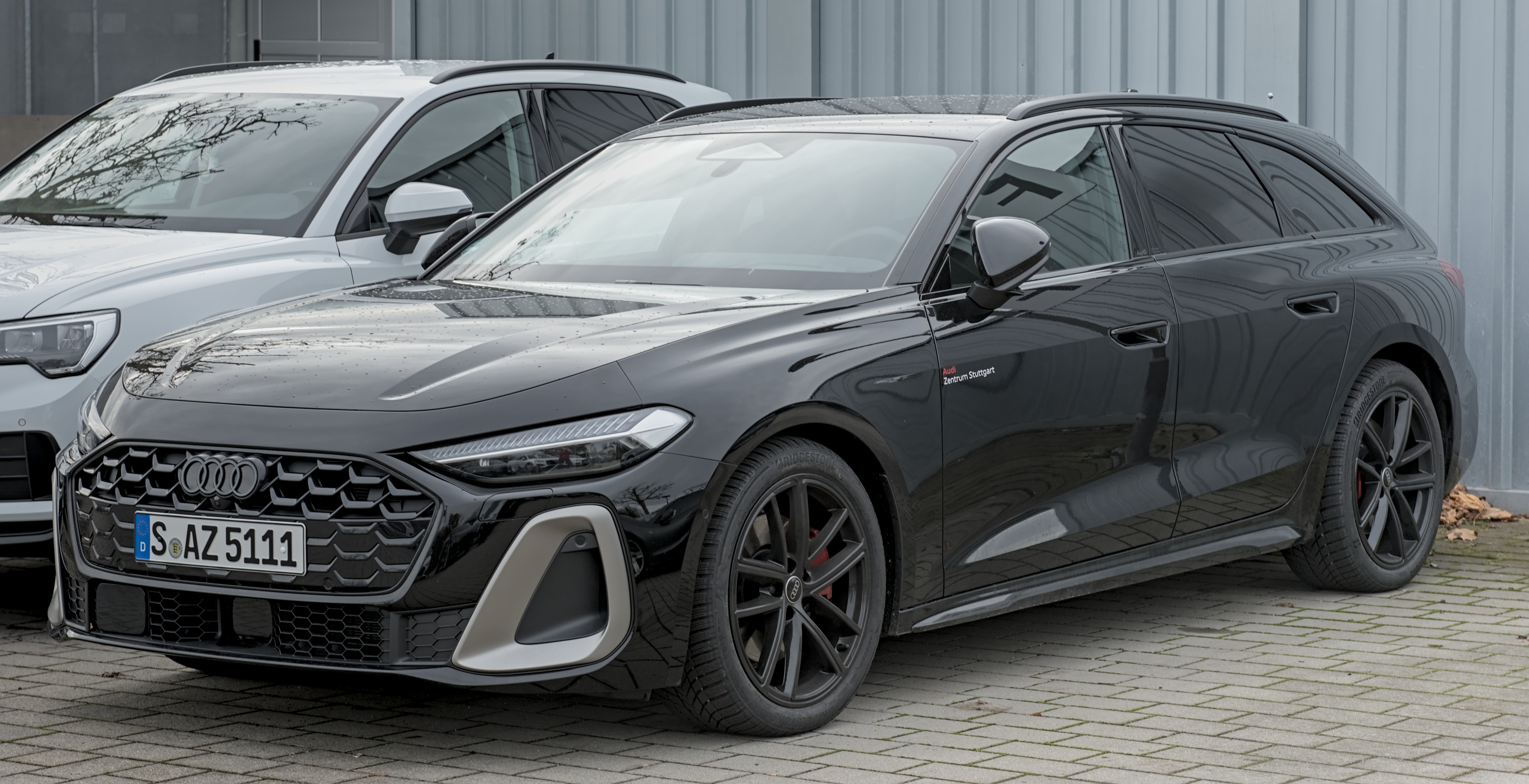
Audi A5 Avant

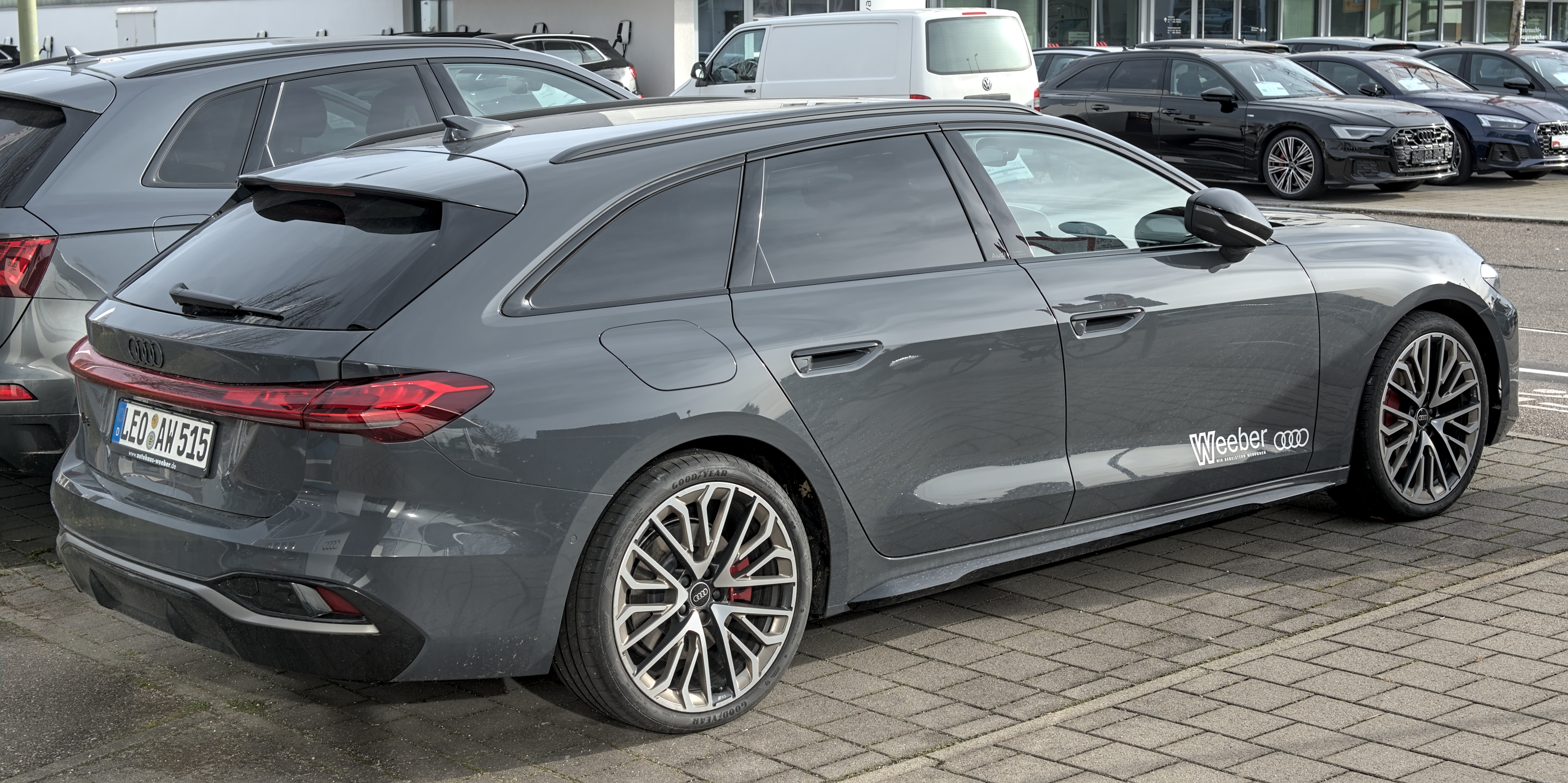
Audi A5 Avant rear view

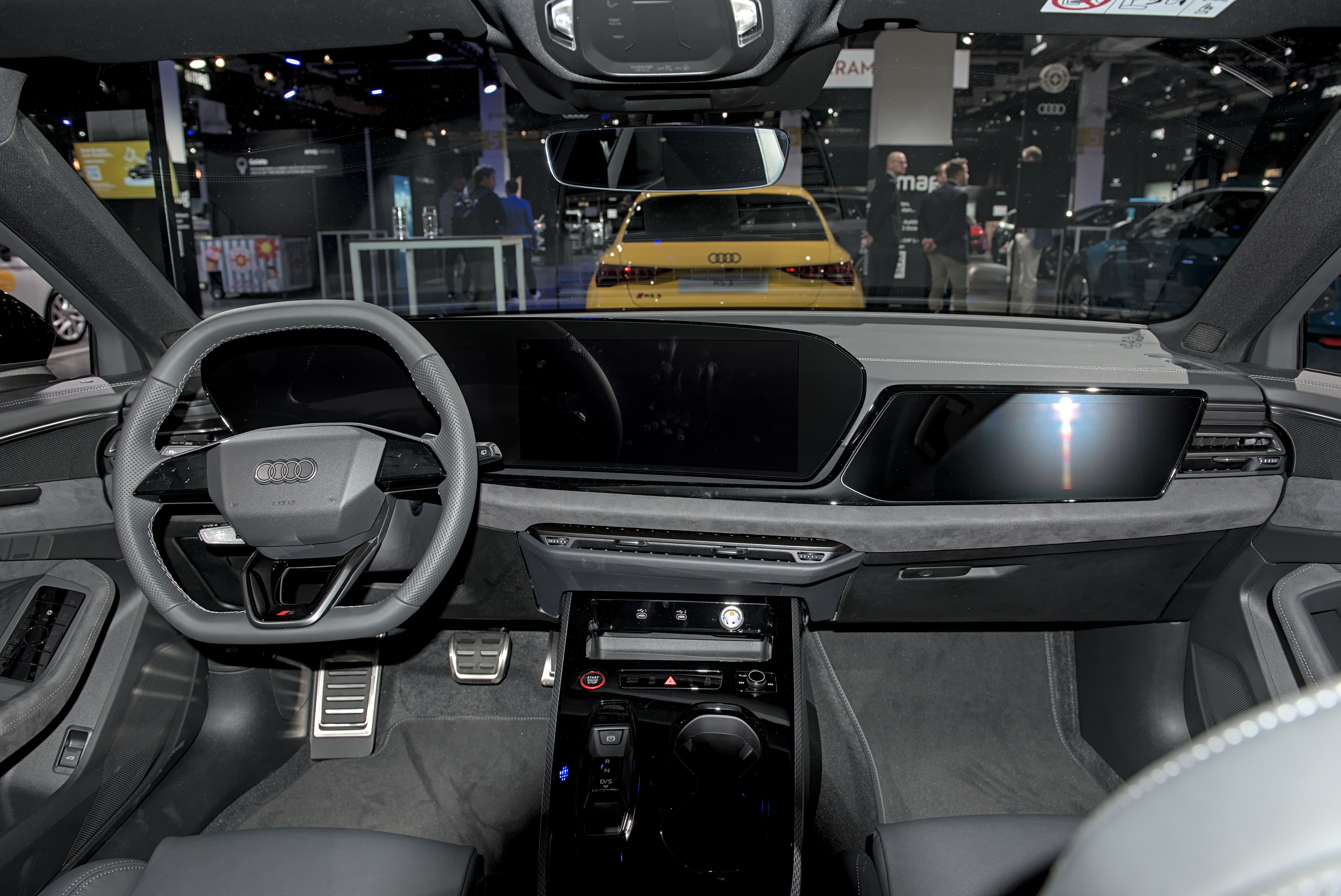
Interior

=== A5L and A5L Sportback ===
The A5L is a China-exclusive long wheelbase sedan model, which was revealed at Auto Guangzhou 2024 by FAW-Audi on 15 November 2024. It has a notchback style rear-end, and has a length of 4,902 mm (193.0 in) and a wheelbase of 2,965 mm (116.7 in), increases of 73 mm (2.9 in) and 65 mm (2.6 in) over the standard model, respectively.

The A5L Sportback was released on 23 April 2025 by SAIC-Audi at Auto Shanghai 2025, with preorders opening on 3 July and deliveries beginning on 1 August 2025. It maintains the standard version's coupe shape, and has a width of 1,883 mm (74.1 in), height of 1,427 mm (56.2 in), length of 4,903 mm (193.0 in), and wheelbase of 2,922 mm (115.0 in), with the latter increasing by 74 mm (2.9 in) and 22 mm (0.87 in) respectively, making for a reduced stretch compared to the previous generation. Styling remains similar outside of a more aggressively sporty grille and side ducts, done by original designer Jakob Hirzel. It also features suspension tuning done by Audi's German engineers to achieve a result closer to the European market tune.

Both models feature a Huawei's Qiankun ADS system, with a 31-sensor ADAS suite consisting of 2 LiDARs, 6 mmWave radars, 11 cameras, and 12 ultrasonic sensors, and will be capable of semiautonomous assisted driving in highway and urban conditions. Both are available with the same 2.0-litre 150 kW (201 hp; 204 PS) EA888 engine with twin-motor 48V system as other markets, and the FAW‑Audi version is also available in front-wheel drive with the 110 kW (148 hp; 150 PS) engine tune.

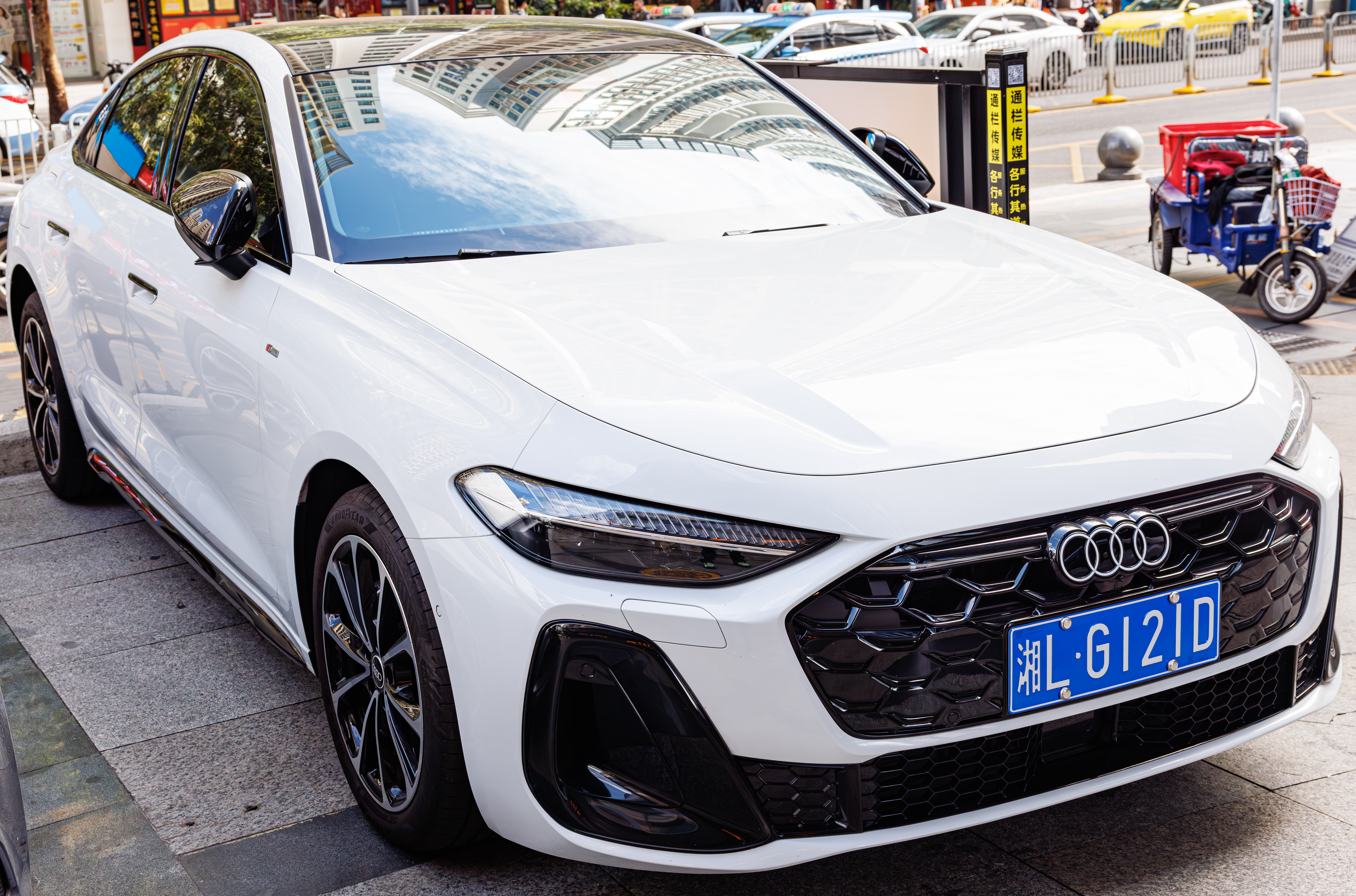
Audi A5L (sedan)

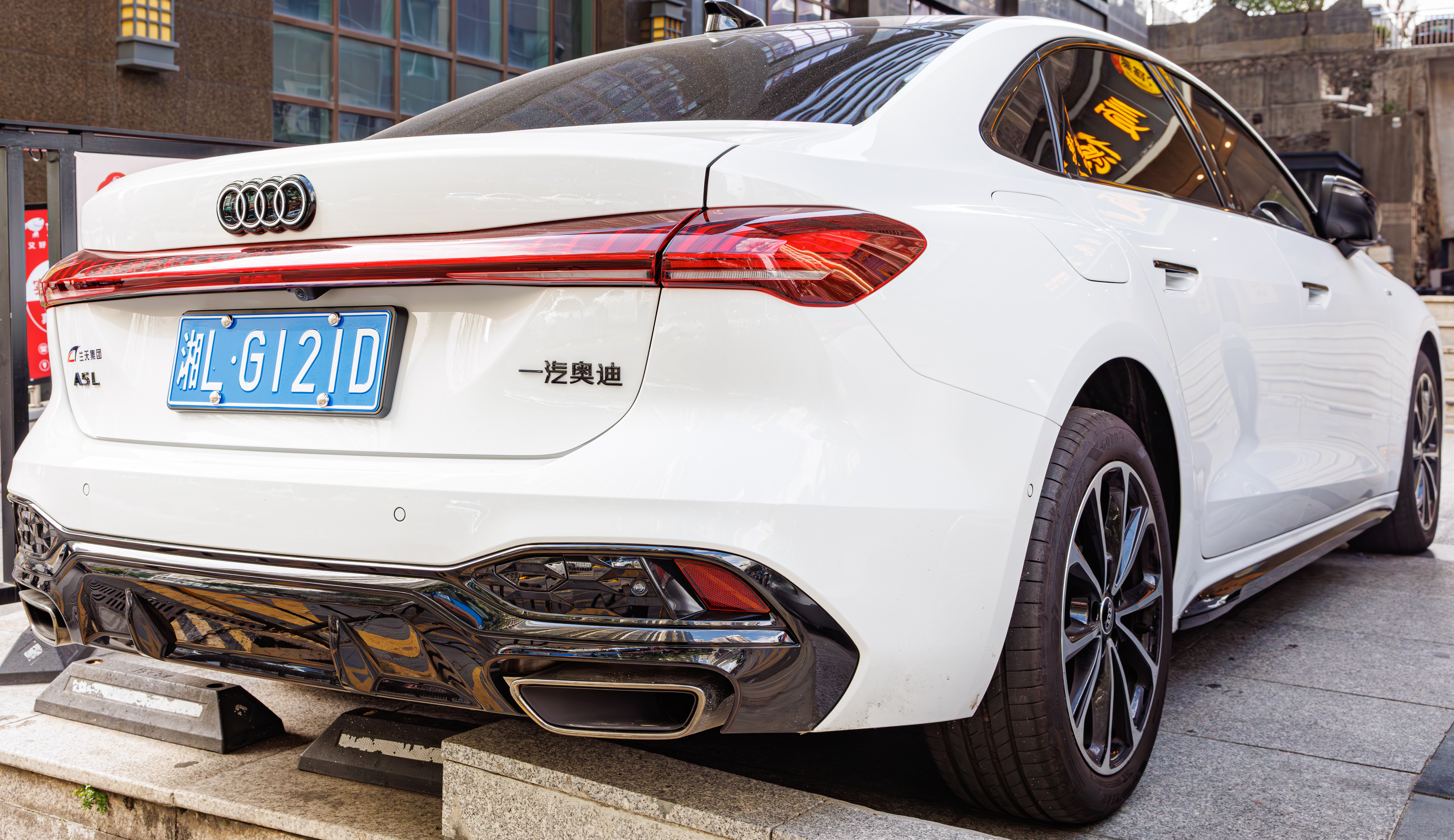
Audi A5L (sedan) rear view

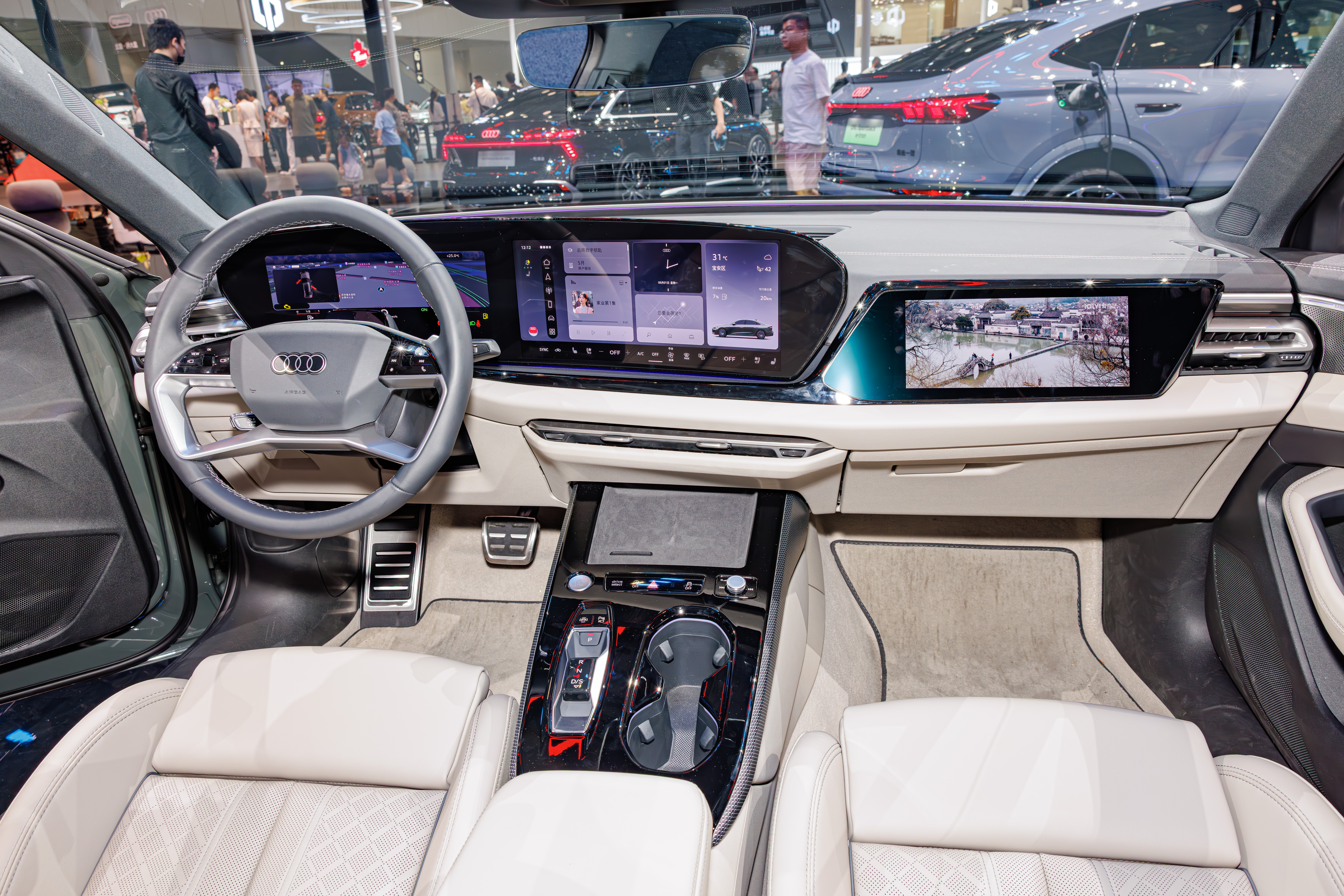
Interior (A5L (sedan))
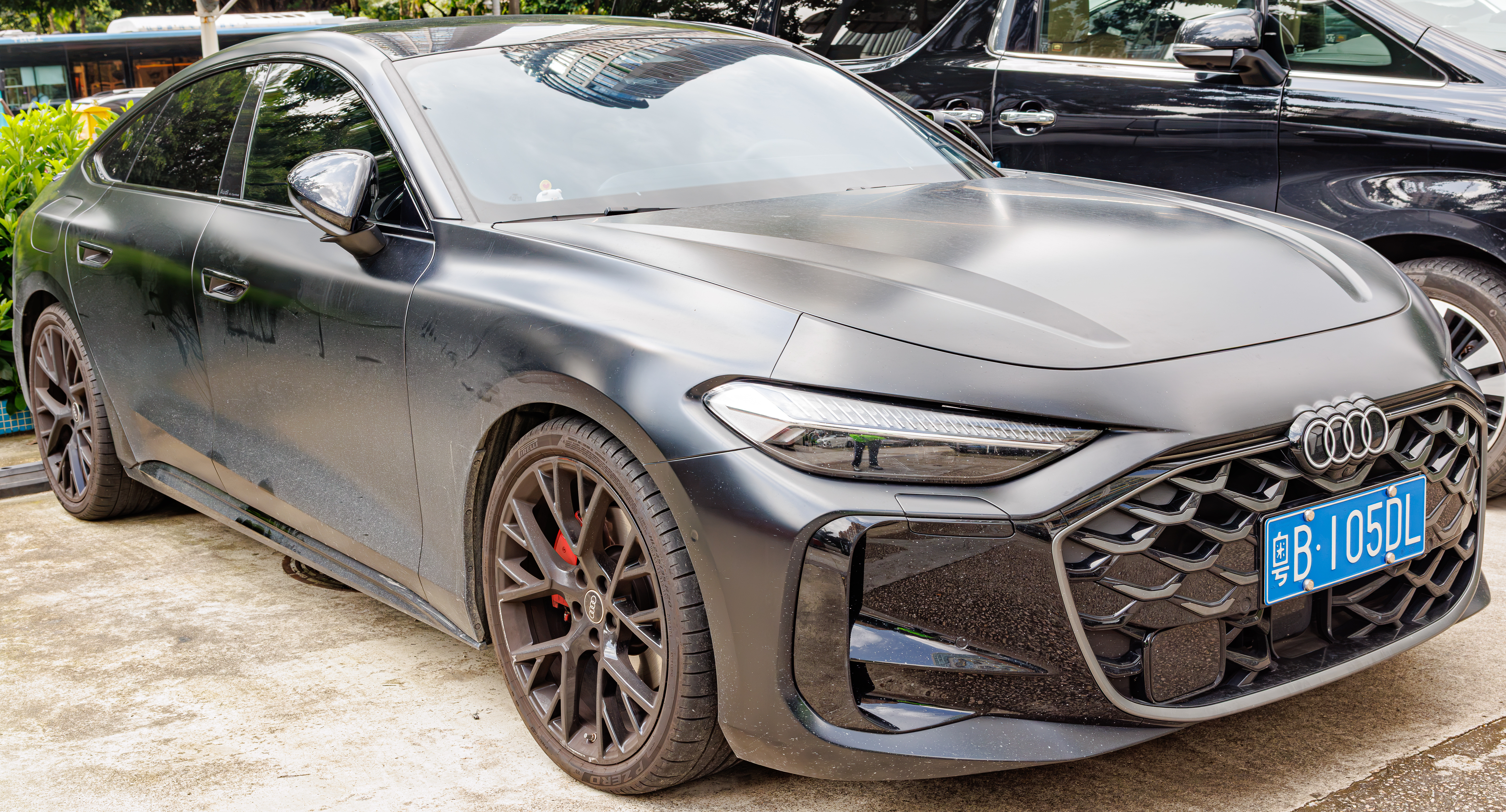
Audi A5L Sportback

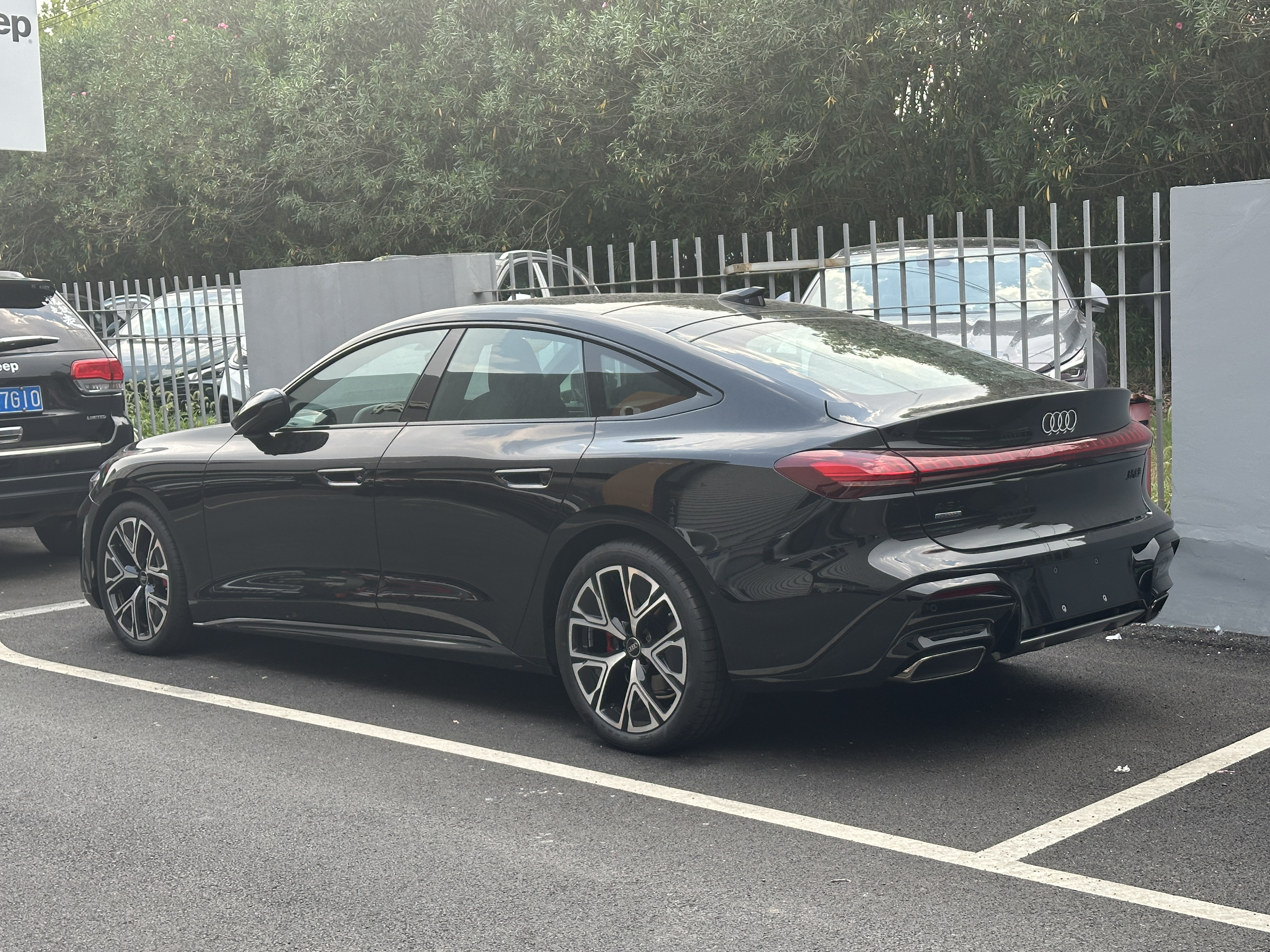
Audi A5L Sportback rear view

=== RS5 ===
The RS 5 is powered by a 2.9-litre TFSI V6 twin-turbo engine paired with an electric motor, forming a plug-in hybrid system that produces a combined output of approximately 630 hp and 609 lb⋅ft (≈825 N⋅m) of torque. The combustion engine alone produces about 503 hp, with the electric motor contributing an additional 174 hp.

Power is delivered to the quattro all-wheel drive system through an 8-speed ZF Friedrichshafen automatic transmission, now enhanced with Dynamic Torque Control for electromechanical torque vectoring on the rear axle. The RS 5 accelerates from 0–100 km/h (0–62 mph) in approximately 3.6 seconds.

The model introduces a significantly more aggressive design, with a wider stance, enlarged air intakes, flared fenders, and a redesigned front fascia, along with a more modern lighting signature and aerodynamic refinements.

Further developments include a heavily revised chassis with increased structural rigidity, updated suspension tuning, and improved adaptive damping. Enhancements such as brake-by-wire technology, optional carbon-ceramic brakes, and performance-focused tires contribute to sharper handling.

A high-capacity battery (around 22 kWh) enables limited all-electric driving capability, adding efficiency and instant torque delivery while also increasing overall vehicle weight due to hybrid integration.

The RS 5 continues to balance high performance with advanced technology, introducing a more digital, multi-screen interior layout and new driver-focused performance analytics features.

The RS5 Sedan and Avant was officially unveiled on 19 February 2026.

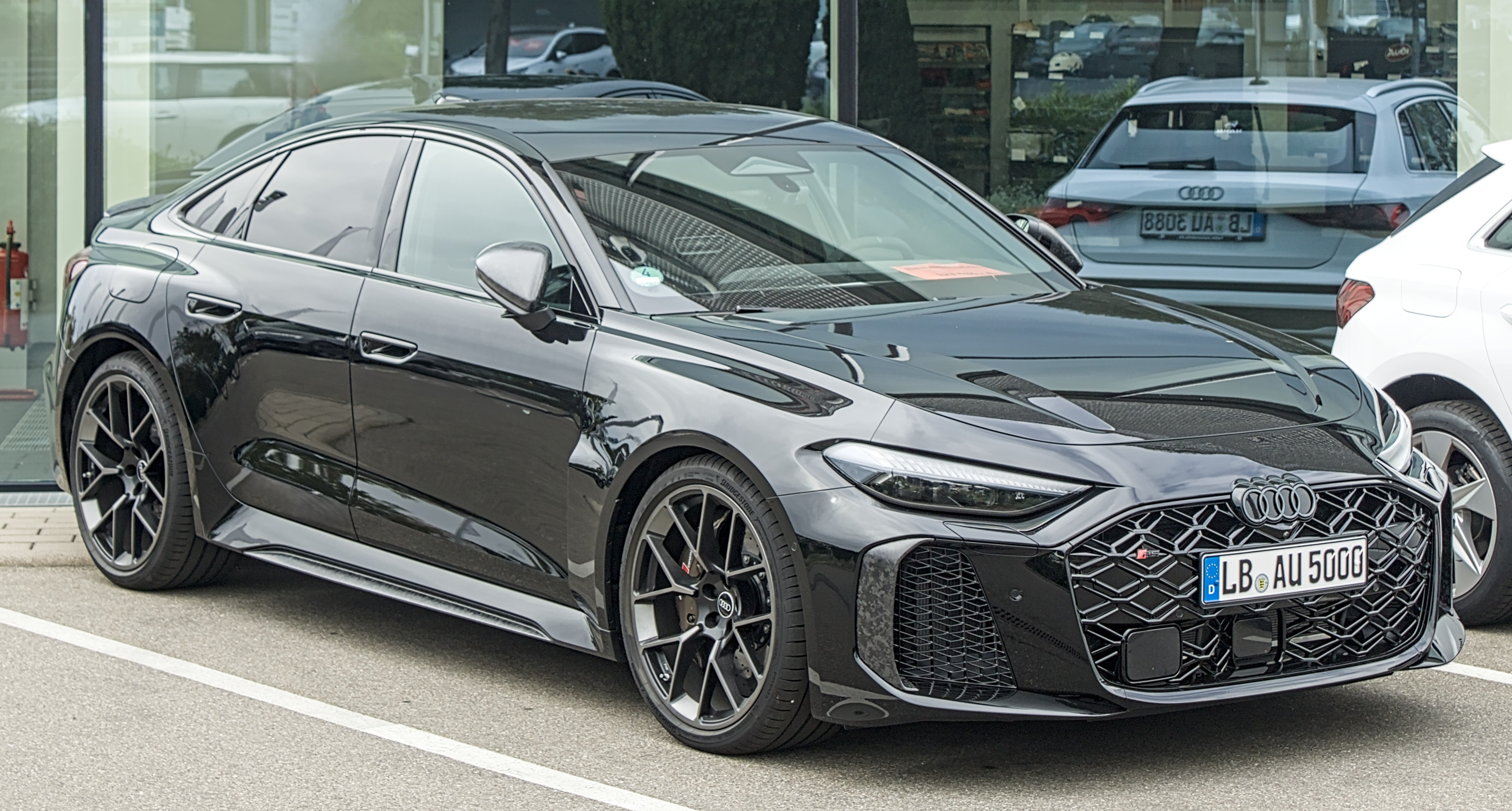
Sedan Front

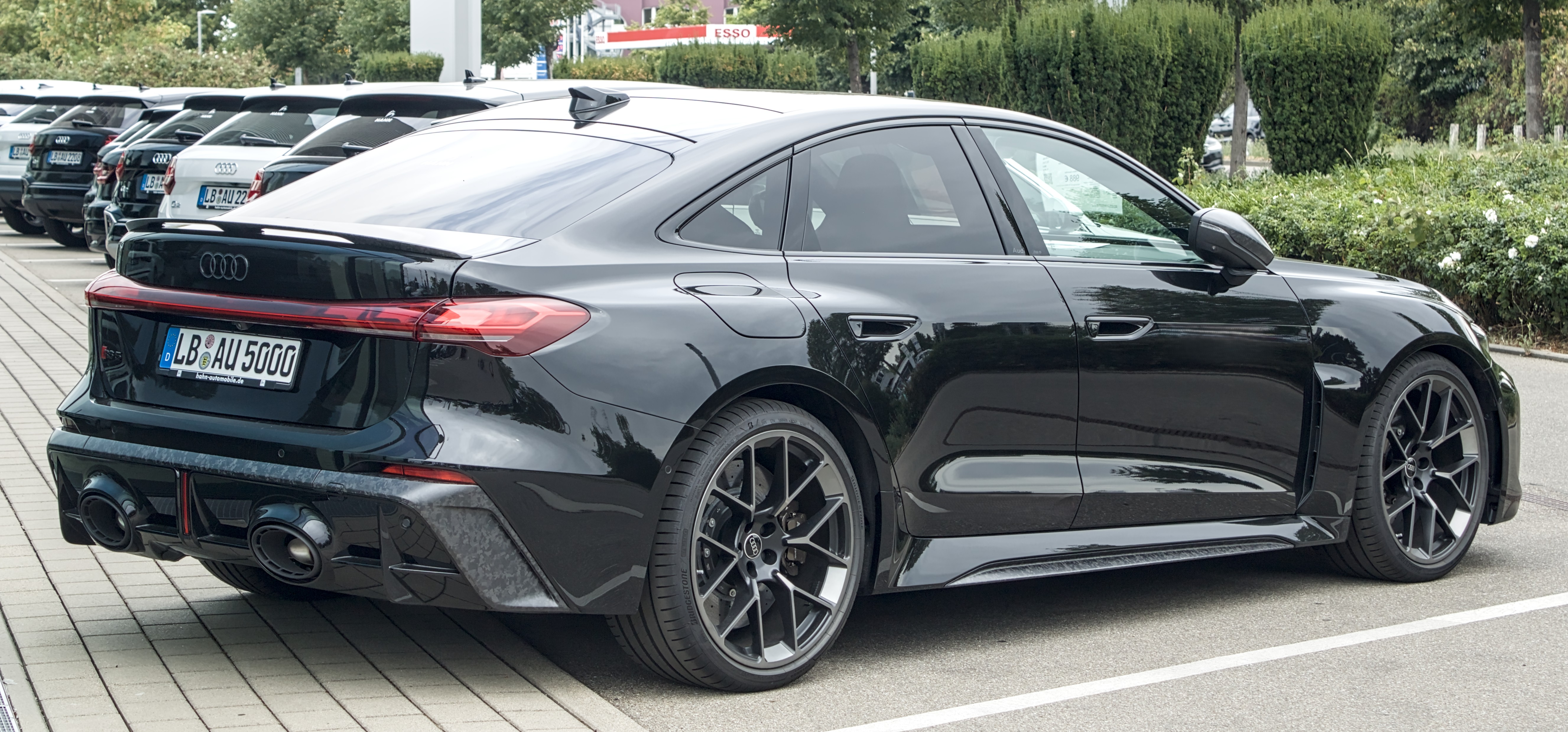
Sedan Rear

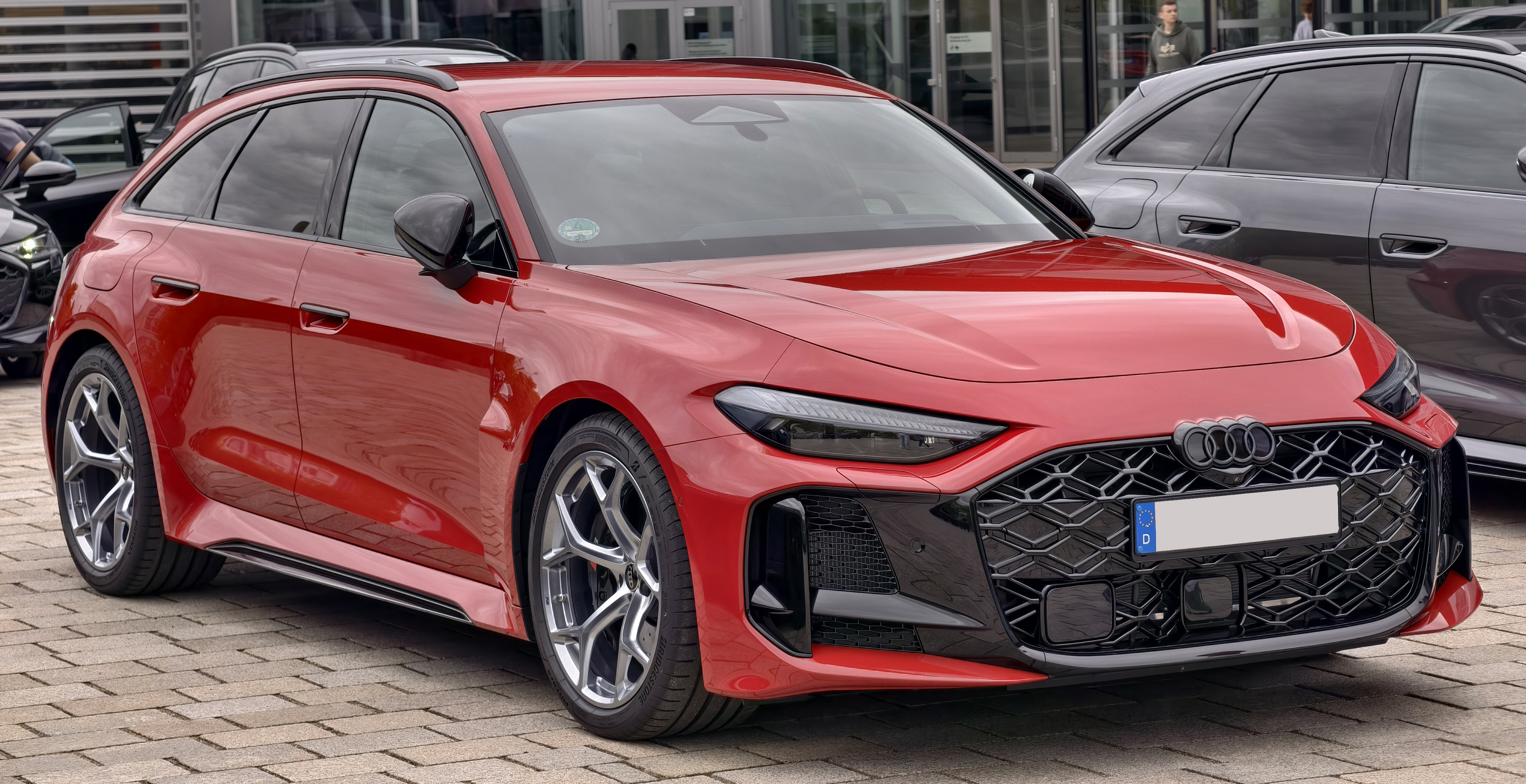
Avant Front

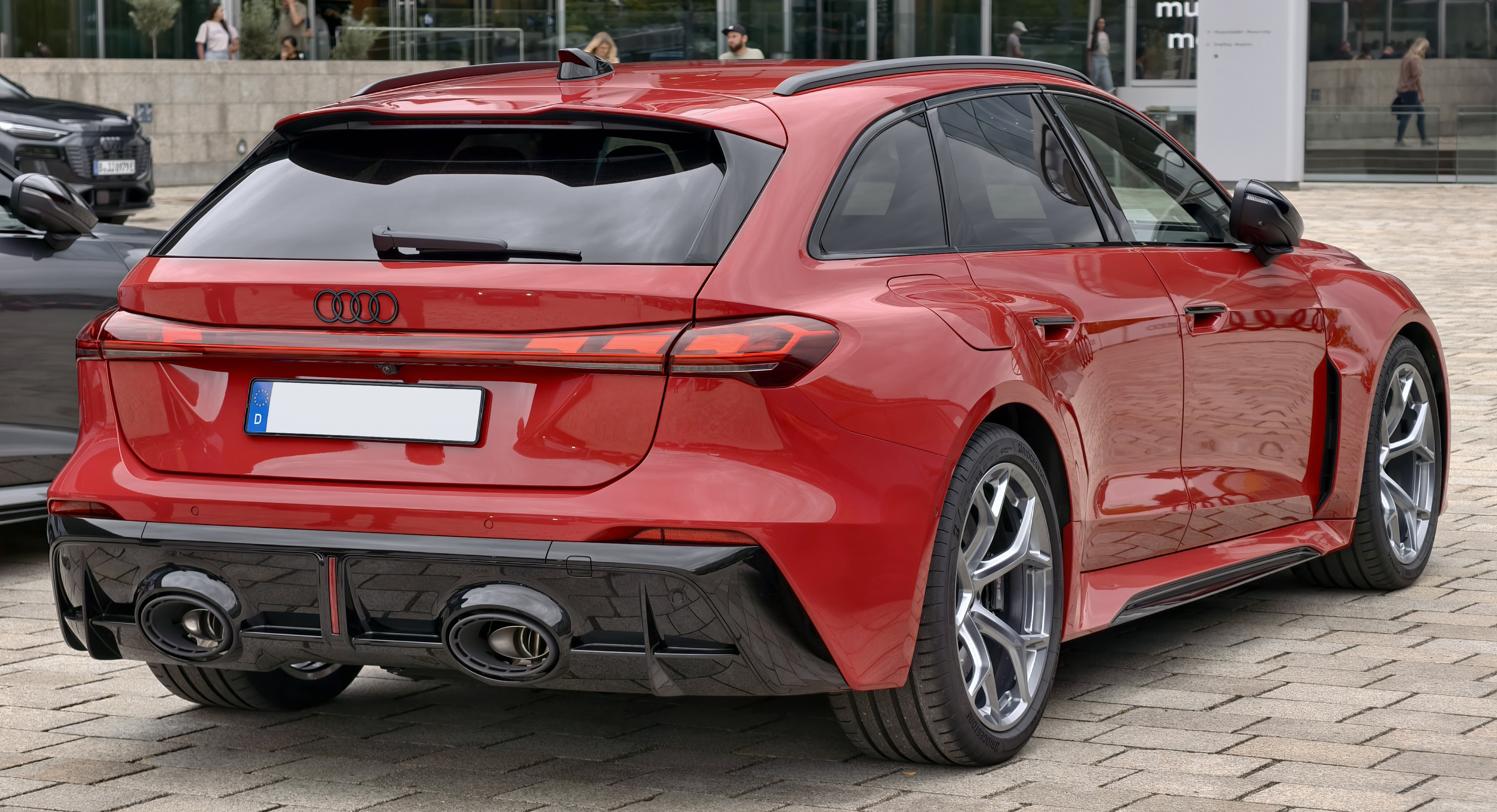
Avant Rear

=== Engines ===
The engines used are 2.0-litre in-line four-cylinder petrol engines from the EA888 series, 3.0-litre V6 petrol engines from the EA839 series and 2-litre in-line four-cylinder diesel engines from the EA288 evo series. Unlike its predecessor, the manual gearboxes are no longer available. Instead of fake tailpipe covers as in the previous generation, only real tailpipes are fitted in response to customer feedback. The A5 B10 is the first model series to use Audi's advanced second-generation mild hybrid called 'MHEV plus technology'. In addition to the familiar belt starter generator, a new powertrain generator with integrated power electronics is placed on the transmission output shaft. In combination with the 48-volt battery, this enables partial electric driving with an output of 24 PS (18 kW; 24 hp) and 230 N⋅m (170 lb⋅ft) of torque. The powertrain generator recuperates energy back into the battery at up to 25 kW. The battery is positioned above the rear axle and has a separate cooling circuit. Overall, the system is designed to increase the fuel efficiency.

In March 2025, the plug-in hybrid electric vehicle (PHEV) powertrain marketed as the e-hybrid was introduced and it is available two power outputs. The plug-in hybrid powertrain uses the 2.0 TFSI engine from the EA888 series producing 252 PS (185 kW; 249 hp), combined with an electric motor that produces an output of 143 PS (105 kW; 141 hp). The 25.9 kWh lithium-ion battery is positioned above the rear axle with a maximum AC charging power of 11 kW and the charging time from 0 to 100 percent to just 2.5 hours. The e-hybrid model has two driving modes are available: EV and Hybrid. In addition to the two driving modes, the desired charge level can be individually selected for the first time using a digital slider. The e-hybrid model runs on electric power during regenerative braking to utilise the available battery charge to the driver's destination. When this function is activated, the vehicle recovers energy automatically based on route data stored in the navigation system and can also recover energy automatically without an active route guidance.

Petrol engines
Model	Codename	Engine	Power	Torque	Top speed		0–100 km/h (0–62 mph)	
Model	Codename	Engine	Power	Torque	Sedan	Avant	Sedan	Avant
2.0 TFSI	VW EA888	2.0 L (1,984 cc)	150 PS (110 kW; 148 hp)	280 N⋅m (207 lb⋅ft)	216 km/h (134 mph)	214 km/h (133 mph)	9.8 s	
2.0 TFSI	VW EA888	2.0 L (1,984 cc)	204 PS (150 kW; 201 hp)	340 N⋅m (251 lb⋅ft)	248 km/h (154 mph)	245 km/h (152 mph)	7.8 s	
2.0 TFSI quattro	VW EA888	2.0 L (1,984 cc)	204 PS (150 kW; 201 hp)	340 N⋅m (251 lb⋅ft)	245 km/h (152 mph)	242 km/h (150 mph)	7.6 s	
2.0 TFSI quattro	VW EA888	2.0 L (1,984 cc)	272 PS (200 kW; 268 hp)	400 N⋅m (295 lb⋅ft)	250 km/h (155 mph)		5.9 s	
S5 3.0 V6 TFSI	VW EA839	3.0 L (2,995 cc)	367 PS (270 kW; 362 hp)	550 N⋅m (406 lb⋅ft)	250 km/h (155 mph)		4.5 s	
Petrol plug-in hybrid engines
2.0 e-hybrid quattro	VW EA888	2.0 L (1,984 cc)	299 PS (220 kW; 295 hp)	450 N⋅m (332 lb⋅ft)	250 km/h (155 mph)		5.9 s	
2.0 e-hybrid quattro competition	VW EA888	2.0 L (1,984 cc)	367 PS (270 kW; 362 hp)	500 N⋅m (369 lb⋅ft)	250 km/h (155 mph)		5.1 s	
RS5 2.9 V6 TFSI	VW EA839TT	2.9 L (2,894 cc)	639 PS (470 kW; 630 hp)	825 N⋅m (608 lb⋅ft)	285 km/h (177 mph)		3.6 s	
Diesel engines
2.0 TDI	VW EA288	2.0 L (1,968 cc)	204 PS (150 kW; 201 hp)	400 N⋅m (295 lb⋅ft)	242 km/h (150 mph)	240 km/h (149 mph)	7.7 s	
2.0 TDI quattro	VW EA288	2.0 L (1,968 cc)	204 PS (150 kW; 201 hp)	400 N⋅m (295 lb⋅ft)	241 km/h (150 mph)	236 km/h (147 mph)	6.9 s	

=== Safety ===
ANCAP test results Audi A5 all variants (2024, aligned with Euro NCAP)
Test	Points	%
Overall:	5 /5 stars	
Adult occupant:	34.82	87%
Child occupant:	42.97	87%
Pedestrian:	49.62	78%
Safety assist:	14.37	79%

Euro NCAP test results Audi A5 Avant 2.0 TDI 'Basis' (LHD) (2024)
Test	Points	%
Overall:	5 /5 stars	
Adult occupant:	34.8	87%
Child occupant:	43.2	88%
Pedestrian:	49.6	78%
Safety assist:	14	77%

== Production and sales ==
Production
Year	Total
2006	487
2007	25,554
2008	57,650
2009	69,495
2010	90,346
2011	111,758
2012	103,357
2013	98,207
2014	88,545
2015	79,133
2016	65,117
2017	119,595
2018	111,544
2019	93,077
2020	56,786
2021	64,012
2022	66,124
2023	75,584

Sales
Year	China						US
Year	A5	S5	RS5	A5L	Sportback	Total	US
2023	15,031	428	367	—	—	15,826	23,777
2024	12,523	231	320	—	—	13,074	24,636
2025	4,864	128	220	21,086	12,087	38,385	16,886
