= 2012 Superstars Series =

Seasons
- ← 2011 2013 →

The 2012 Superstars Series season was the ninth year of the Superstars Series, an Italian-based touring car racing series, featuring the ninth edition of the Campionato Italiano Superstars (Italian Superstars Championship) and the sixth year of the International Superstars Series. The season began at Monza on April 1 and finished at Pergusa on October 28, after eighth round. A ninth round was planned at Sentul but it was cancelled.

All eight rounds counted towards the International title, with five rounds counting towards the Italian title. Both championship were won by Johan Kristoffersson driving for Audi.

== Teams and drivers ==
- All teams use Hankook tyres.

| Team | Car | No. | Drivers | Rounds |
|---|---|---|---|---|
| (Switzerland) Swiss Team | Maserati Quattroporte | 1 | (Finland) Mika Salo | 1, 6 |
| (Switzerland) Swiss Team | Maserati Quattroporte | 1 | (Brazil) Christian Fittipaldi | 2, 8 |
| (Switzerland) Swiss Team | Maserati Quattroporte | 1 | (United Kingdom) Johnny Herbert | 3–4 |
| (Switzerland) Swiss Team | Maserati Quattroporte | 1 | (Austria) Christian Klien | 5 |
| (Switzerland) Swiss Team | Maserati Quattroporte | 1 | (Italy) Giancarlo Fisichella | 7 |
| (Switzerland) Swiss Team | Maserati Quattroporte | 2 | (Italy) Mauro Cesari | All |
| (Italy) Dinamic Motorsport | BMW M3 (E92) | 3 | (Italy) Thomas Biagi | All |
| (Italy) Dinamic Motorsport | BMW M3 (E92) | 4 | (Italy) Sandro Bettini | 1–4 |
| (Italy) Dinamic Motorsport | BMW M3 (E92) | 4 | (Italy) Franco Fumi | 5 |
| (Italy) Dinamic Motorsport | BMW M3 (E92) | 4 | (United Kingdom) Jeff Smith | 6 |
| (Italy) Dinamic Motorsport | BMW M3 (E92) | 4 | (Italy) Max Mugelli | 7–8 |
| (Italy) Dinamic Motorsport | BMW M3 (E92) | 6 | (Italy) Stefano Gabellini | 1–6 |
| (Italy) Dinamic Motorsport | BMW M3 (E92) | 6 | (Italy) Giovanni Berton | 7–8 |
| (Italy) Todi Corse | BMW M3 (E90) | 8 | (Italy) Francesco Ascani | 1–2, 4, 7 |
| (Italy) Todi Corse | BMW 550i (E60) | 56 | (Italy) Leonardo Baccarelli | 1–2, 4, 7 |
| (Italy) Todi Corse | BMW 550i (E60) | 56 | (Italy) Marco Pollara | 8 |
| (San Marino) W&D Racing Team | BMW M3 (E90) | 9 | (San Marino) Paolo Meloni | 1–7 |
| (San Marino) W&D Racing Team | BMW M3 (E90) | 10 | (San Marino) Walter Meloni | 1–7 |
| (Italy) Solaris Motorsport | Chevrolet Lumina CR8 | 11 | (Italy) Simone Iacone | 8 |
| (Italy) Solaris Motorsport | Chevrolet Lumina CR8 | 12 | (Italy) Francesco Sini | All |
| (Italy) Ferlito Motors | Jaguar XFR | 18 | (Italy) Max Pigoli | All |
| (Italy) Ferlito Motors | Jaguar XFR | 19 | (Italy) Gian Maria Gabbiani | 1 |
| (Italy) Ferlito Motors | Jaguar XFR | 19 | (Indonesia) Ananda Mikola | 2 |
| (Italy) Ferlito Motors | Jaguar XFR | 19 | (United Kingdom) Tom Onslow-Cole | 3 |
| (Italy) Ferlito Motors | Jaguar XFR | 19 | (Italy) Andrea Boffo | 4 |
| (Italy) Ferlito Motors | Jaguar XFR | 19 | (Italy) Domenico Ferlito | 5–7 |
| (Italy) Ferlito Motors | Jaguar XFR | 19 | (Italy) Ezio Muccio | 8 |
| (Italy) MRT by Nocentini | Chrysler 300C SRT-8 | 22 | (Italy) Niccolò Mercatali | 1 |
| (Italy) MRT by Nocentini | Chrysler 300C SRT-8 | 22 | (Italy) Alessandro Battaglin | 7 |
| (Italy) MRT by Nocentini | Lexus IS-F | 23 | (Italy) Simone Monforte | 1 |
| (Italy) MRT by Nocentini | Lexus IS-F | 23 | (Italy) Michele Faccin | 7 |
| (Italy) Roma Racing Team | Mercedes C63 AMG | 27 | (Italy) Nico Caldarola | 1–4, 6 |
| (Italy) Roma Racing Team | Mercedes C63 AMG Coupé | 27 | (Italy) Nico Caldarola | 7–8 |
| (Italy) Roma Racing Team | Mercedes C63 AMG | 28 | (Italy) Andrea Boffo | 1–3 |
| (Italy) Roma Racing Team | Mercedes C63 AMG | 28 | (Indonesia) Ananda Mikola | 4 |
| (Italy) Roma Racing Team | Mercedes C63 AMG | 28 | (Italy) Alessandro Garofano | 6 |
| (Italy) Roma Racing Team | Mercedes C63 AMG | 28 | (Italy) Luca Rangoni | 6 |
| (Italy) Roma Racing Team | Mercedes C63 AMG | 28 | (Italy) Luigi Ferrara | 8 |
| (Italy) Romeo Ferraris | Mercedes C63 AMG | 30 | (Colombia) Camilo Zurcher | 4–7 |
| (Italy) Romeo Ferraris | Mercedes C63 AMG | 30 | (Italy) Raffaele Giammaria | 8 |
| (Italy) Romeo Ferraris | Mercedes C63 AMG | 99 | (Italy) Andrea Larini | All |
| (Italy) Scuderia Giudici | BMW M3 (E92) | 33 | (Italy) Riccardo Bossi | 1 |
| (Italy) Scuderia Giudici | BMW M3 (E92) | 33 | (Italy) Gianni Giudici | 2, 4–5, 7 |
| (Italy) Scuderia Giudici | BMW M3 (E92) | 43 | (Italy) Marco Fumagalli | 2, 4 |
| (Italy) Scuderia Giudici | BMW M3 (E92) | 43 | (Italy) Andrea Perlini | 2, 4 |
| (Italy) Scuderia Giudici | BMW M3 (E92) | 43 | (Hungary) Norbert Michelisz | 5 |
| (Italy) Scuderia Giudici | BMW 550i (E60) | 43 | (Italy) Marco Fumagalli | 1 |
| (Italy) Scuderia Giudici | BMW 550i (E60) | 43 | (Italy) Andrea Perlini | 1 |
| (Italy) Audi Sport Italia | Audi RS5 | 45 | (Italy) Gianni Morbidelli | All |
| (Sweden) Audi Sport KMS | Audi RS5 | 46 | (Sweden) Johan Kristoffersson | All |
| (Germany) MTM Motorsport | Audi RS4 | 47 | (Germany) Thomas Schöffler | 1 |
| (Germany) MTM Motorsport | Audi RS5 | 47 | (Germany) Thomas Schöffler | 2–8 |
| (Italy) CAAL Racing | Mercedes C63 AMG | 54 | (Italy) Vitantonio Liuzzi | All |
| (Italy) CAAL Racing | Mercedes C63 AMG | 58 | (Italy) Max Mugelli | 1–5 |
| (Italy) CAAL Racing | Mercedes C63 AMG | 58 | (Italy) Luigi Ferrara | 6 |
| (Italy) CAAL Racing | Mercedes C63 AMG | 58 | (Italy) Andrea Bacci | 7–8 |

=== Changes ===
- ROAL Motorsport (Team BMW Italia) retired from the series at the end of 2011; for 2012 it provided technical support to the new team Dinamic.
- Swiss-based Solaris Motorsport took over the Chevrolet Lumina program left by Motorzone Race Car.
- Audi Sport Italia developed the new Audi RS5 racer, fielding one car and providing support for two private teams: Swedish team Kristoffersson Motorsport (racing as Audi Sport KMS) and German team MTM Motorsport.
- San Marino based W&D Racing Team joined the series with two BMW M3 (E90).
- Starting mid-season, Roma Racing Team fielded a brand-new Superstars racing car, the Mercedes C63 AMG Coupé developed by Top Run Engineering.
- Spain-based Campos Racing retired from the series.

== Calendar ==
| Round | Circuit/Location | Date |
|---|---|---|
| 1 | (Italy) Autodromo Nazionale Monza | 1 April |
| 2 | (Italy) Autodromo Enzo e Dino Ferrari, Imola | 22 April |
| 3 | (United Kingdom) Donington Park, Leicestershire | 20 May |
| 4 | (Italy) Autodromo Internazionale del Mugello | 3 June |
| 5 | (Hungary) Hungaroring, Budapest | 1 July |
| 6 | (Belgium) Circuit de Spa-Francorchamps | 15 July |
| 7 | (Italy) Autodromo Vallelunga "Piero Taruffi", Campagnano | 7 October |
| 8 | (Italy) Autodromo di Pergusa, Pergusa | 28 October |
| | (Indonesia) Sentul International Circuit, Bogor | cancelled |

International Superstars Series only
Both championships

== Results ==
| Round | | Circuit | Pole position | Fastest lap | Winning driver | Winning team | Report |
|---|---|---|---|---|---|---|---|
| 1 | R1 | Monza | (Italy) Max Pigoli | (Italy) Andrea Larini | (Italy) Max Pigoli | (Italy) Ferlito Motors | Report |
| 1 | R2 | Monza | | (Italy) Francesco Sini | (Italy) Vitantonio Liuzzi | (Italy) CAAL Racing | Report |
| 2 | R1 | Imola | (Sweden) Johan Kristoffersson | (Italy) Gianni Morbidelli | (Sweden) Johan Kristoffersson | (Sweden) Audi Sport KMS | Report |
| 2 | R2 | Imola | | (Italy) Gianni Morbidelli | (Sweden) Johan Kristoffersson | (Sweden) Audi Sport KMS | Report |
| 3 | R1 | Donington Park | (Italy) Gianni Morbidelli | (Italy) Gianni Morbidelli | (Italy) Gianni Morbidelli | (Italy) Audi Sport Italia | Report |
| 3 | R2 | Donington Park | | (Italy) Gianni Morbidelli | (Italy) Gianni Morbidelli | (Italy) Audi Sport Italia | Report |
| 4 | R1 | Mugello | (Italy) Thomas Biagi | (United Kingdom) Johnny Herbert | (Italy) Andrea Larini | (Italy) Romeo Ferraris | Report |
| 4 | R2 | Mugello | | (Italy) Stefano Gabellini | (Italy) Francesco Sini | (Italy) Solaris Motorsport | Report |
| 5 | R1 | Hungaroring | (Italy) Vitantonio Liuzzi | (Sweden) Johan Kristoffersson | (Italy) Vitantonio Liuzzi | (Italy) CAAL Racing | Report |
| 5 | R2 | Hungaroring | | (Italy) Thomas Biagi | (Austria) Christian Klien | (Switzerland) Swiss Team | Report |
| 6 | R1 | Spa | (Italy) Gianni Morbidelli | (Sweden) Johan Kristoffersson | (Italy) Gianni Morbidelli | (Italy) Audi Sport Italia | Report |
| 6 | R2 | Spa | | (Italy) Gianni Morbidelli | (Italy) Gianni Morbidelli | (Italy) Audi Sport Italia | Report |
| 7 | R1 | Vallelunga | (Sweden) Johan Kristoffersson | (Germany) Thomas Schöffler | (Sweden) Johan Kristoffersson | (Sweden) Audi Sport KMS | Report |
| 7 | R2 | Vallelunga | | (Sweden) Johan Kristoffersson | (Sweden) Johan Kristoffersson | (Sweden) Audi Sport KMS | Report |
| 8 | R1 | Pergusa | (Italy) Raffaele Giammaria | (Italy) Raffaele Giammaria | (Italy) Raffaele Giammaria | (Italy) Romeo Ferraris | Report |
| 8 | R2 | Pergusa | | (Italy) Raffaele Giammaria | (Italy) Raffaele Giammaria | (Italy) Romeo Ferraris | Report |
| 9 | R1 | Sentul | Round cancelled | | | | |
| 9 | R2 | Sentul | Round cancelled | | | | |

== Championship standings ==
Scoring system

| Position | 1st | 2nd | 3rd | 4th | 5th | 6th | 7th | 8th | 9th | 10th | Pole | Fastest Lap | Start |
| Points | 20 | 15 | 12 | 10 | 8 | 6 | 4 | 3 | 2 | 1 | 1 | 1 | 1 |

=== Campionato Italiano Superstars ===
| Pos | Driver | MNZ (Italy) | | IMO (Italy) | | MUG (Italy) | | VAL (Italy) | | PER (Italy) | | Pts |
|---|---|---|---|---|---|---|---|---|---|---|---|---|
| 1 | (Sweden) Johan Kristoffersson | 5 | Ret | **1** | 1 | 4 | 7 | **1** | 1 | 5 | Ret | 124 |
| 2 | (Italy) Thomas Biagi | 4 | 4 | 3 | 2 | **Ret** | 3 | 3 | 6 | Ret | 3 | 100 |
| 3 | (Italy) Vitantonio Liuzzi | 3 | 1 | 6 | Ret | 5 | 5 | 4 | 7 | 3 | 9 | 92 |
| 4 | (Italy) Francesco Sini | Ret | 3 | 4 | Ret | 7 | 1 | 17 | 17 | 2 | Ret | 72 |
| 5 | (Italy) Andrea Larini | 2 | 7 | 2 | 7 | 1 | Ret | 14 | 9 | Ret | DSQ | 71 |
| 6 | (Italy) Max Pigoli | **1** | 2 | 10 | 16 | 6 | Ret | Ret | DNS | 11 | DNS | 51 |
| 7 | (Italy) Stefano Gabellini | 17 | 8 | 7 | 6 | 3 | 2 | | | | | 47 |
| | (Germany) Thomas Schöffler | 12 | Ret | 9 | 5 | 11 | 15 | 2 | 4 | 9 | Ret | 47 |
| 9 | (Italy) Raffaele Giammaria | | | | | | | | | **1** | 1 | 45 |
| 10 | (Italy) Gianni Morbidelli | 7 | 5 | 17 | 14 | Ret | DNS | 18 | 5 | 6 | Ret | 37 |
| 11 | (Italy) Max Mugelli | 9 | 14 | 11 | 15 | 16 | 9 | 6 | 3 | 13 | 7 | 36 |
| 12 | (Brazil) Christian Fittipaldi | | | 5 | 4 | | | | | Ret | 5 | 30 |
| | (Italy) Mauro Cesari | 16 | 10 | 12 | 9 | 10 | 6 | 10 | 12 | 8 | 6 | 30 |
| 14 | (Italy) Nico Caldarola | 8 | 6 | 19 | 8 | 14 | 10 | Ret | 18 | 10 | Ret | 24 |
| 15 | (Italy) Giovanni Berton | | | | | | | 7 | 2 | 12 | Ret | 23 |
| | (Italy) Andrea Boffo | 19 | 9 | 8 | 3 | Ret | 16 | | | | | 23 |
| 17 | (Italy) Luigi Ferrara | | | | | | | | | 7 | 2 | 21 |
| 18 | (United Kingdom) Johnny Herbert | | | | | 2 | Ret | | | | | 18 |
| 19 | (Italy) Andrea Bacci | | | | | | | 11 | 8 | 4 | Ret | 17 |
| | (Indonesia) Ananda Mikola | | | Ret | Ret | 8 | 4 | | | | | 17 |
| 21 | (San Marino) Paolo Meloni | 10 | 15 | 13 | 11 | 9 | 8 | 9 | 14 | | | 16 |
| 22 | (Italy) Simone Iacone | | | | | | | | | Ret | 4 | 12 |
| | (Colombia) Camilo Zurcher | | | | | Ret | 14 | 5 | Ret | | | 12 |
| 24 | (Finland) Mika Salo | 6 | 16 | | | | | | | | | 8 |
| | (San Marino) Walter Meloni | 13 | 11 | 16 | 12 | 13 | 12 | 15 | 15 | | | 8 |
| 26 | (Italy) Sandro Bettini | 11 | Ret | 14 | 10 | Ret | DNS | | | | | 6 |
| | (Italy) Francesco Ascani | DNS | DNS | 18 | Ret | 12 | 11 | 13 | 13 | | | 6 |
| | (Italy) Leonardo Baccarelli | 14 | 12 | DNS | DNS | Ret | 13 | Ret | 16 | | | 6 |
| 29 | (Italy) Giancarlo Fisichella | | | | | | | 8 | 11 | | | 5 |
| | (Italy) Ezio Muccio | | | | | | | | | Ret | 8 | 5 |
| 31 | (Italy) Domenico Ferlito | | | | | | | 12 | 10 | | | 3 |
| | (Italy) Marco Fumagalli | 15 | | | 13 | 15 | | | | | | 3 |
| | (Italy) Gianni Giudici | | | Ret | DNS | Ret | DNS | 16 | DNS | | | 3 |
| 34 | (Italy) Andrea Perlini | | 13 | 15 | | | DNS | | | | | 2 |
| | (Italy) Marco Pollara | | | | | | | | | 14 | Ret | 2 |
| | (Italy) Niccolò Mercatali | 18 | Ret | | | | | | | | | 2 |
| | (Italy) Gian Maria Gabbiani | Ret | Ret | | | | | | | | | 2 |
| | (Italy) Michele Faccin | | | | | | | Ret | Ret | | | 2 |
| 39 | (Italy) Riccardo Bossi | Ret | DNS | | | | | | | | | 1 |
| 40 | (Italy) Simone Monforte | DNS | DNS | | | | | | | | | 0 |
| | (Italy) Alessandro Battaglin | | | | | | | DNS | DNS | | | 0 |
| Pos | Driver | MNZ (Italy) | | IMO (Italy) | | MUG (Italy) | | VAL (Italy) | | PER (Italy) | | Pts |

| Colour | Result |
|---|---|
| Gold | Winner |
| Silver | Second place |
| Bronze | Third place |
| Green | Points classification |
| Blue | Non-points classification |
| Blue | Non-classified finish (NC) |
| Purple | Retired, not classified (Ret) |
| Red | Did not qualify (DNQ) |
| Red | Did not pre-qualify (DNPQ) |
| Black | Disqualified (DSQ) |
| White | Did not start (DNS) |
| White | Withdrew (WD) |
| White | Race cancelled (C) |
| Blank | Did not practice (DNP) |
| Blank | Did not arrive (DNA) |
| Blank | Excluded (EX) |

**Bold** – Pole
Italics – Fastest Lap

=== International Superstars Series – Drivers ===
| Pos | Driver | MNZ (Italy) | | IMO (Italy) | | DON (United Kingdom) | | MUG (Italy) | | HUN (Hungary) | | SPA (Belgium) | | VAL (Italy) | | PER (Italy) | | Pts |
|---|---|---|---|---|---|---|---|---|---|---|---|---|---|---|---|---|---|---|
| 1 | (Sweden) Johan Kristoffersson | 5 | Ret | **1** | 1 | 2 | 2 | 4 | 7 | 5 | Ret | 2 | Ret | **1** | 1 | 5 | Ret | 185 |
| 2 | (Italy) Vitantonio Liuzzi | 3 | 1 | 6 | Ret | 5 | 3 | 5 | 5 | **1** | 2 | 3 | 2 | 4 | 7 | 3 | 9 | 181 |
| 3 | (Italy) Thomas Biagi | 4 | 4 | 3 | 2 | 4 | 6 | **Ret** | 3 | 2 | 3 | 10 | 4 | 3 | 6 | Ret | 3 | 161 |
| 4 | (Italy) Gianni Morbidelli | 7 | 5 | 17 | 14 | **1** | 1 | Ret | DNS | 13 | Ret | **1** | 1 | 18 | 5 | 6 | Ret | 128 |
| 5 | (Italy) Francesco Sini | Ret | 3 | 4 | Ret | 10 | 4 | 7 | 1 | 14 | 8 | 11 | Ret | 17 | 17 | 2 | Ret | 92 |
| 6 | (Italy) Andrea Larini | 2 | 7 | 2 | 7 | 8 | 11 | 1 | Ret | 7 | 9 | 8 | 14 | 14 | 9 | Ret | DSQ | 89 |
| 7 | (Italy) Stefano Gabellini | 17 | 8 | 7 | 6 | 7 | Ret | 3 | 2 | Ret | 5 | 9 | 5 | | | | | 75 |
| 8 | (Germany) Thomas Schöffler | 12 | Ret | 9 | 5 | 6 | Ret | 11 | 15 | 10 | 10 | 7 | 6 | 2 | 4 | 9 | Ret | 71 |
| 9 | (Italy) Max Pigoli | **1** | 2 | 10 | 16 | 9 | Ret | 6 | Ret | Ret | DNS | 19 | 9 | Ret | DNS | 11 | DNS | 60 |
| 10 | (Italy) Raffaele Giammaria | | | | | | | | | | | | | | | **1** | 1 | 45 |
| 11 | (Italy) Max Mugelli | 9 | 14 | 11 | 15 | 11 | Ret | 16 | 9 | DNS | DNS | | | 6 | 3 | 13 | 7 | 38 |
| 12 | (United Kingdom) Johnny Herbert | | | | | 3 | 7 | 2 | Ret | | | | | | | | | 36 |
| | (Italy) Mauro Cesari | 16 | 10 | 12 | 9 | 13 | 9 | 10 | 6 | DNS | DNS | 17 | Ret | 10 | 12 | 8 | 6 | 36 |
| 14 | (Colombia) Camilo Zurcher | | | | | | | Ret | 14 | 6 | 6 | 6 | Ret | 5 | Ret | | | 34 |
| | (San Marino) Paolo Meloni | 10 | 15 | 13 | 11 | 12 | 5 | 9 | 8 | 15 | 7 | 16 | 15 | 9 | 14 | | | 34 |
| 16 | (Italy) Luigi Ferrara | | | | | | | | | | | 4 | 11 | | | 7 | 2 | 33 |
| 17 | (Austria) Christian Klien | | | | | | | | | 4 | 1 | | | | | | | 32 |
| | (Italy) Nico Caldarola | 8 | 6 | 19 | 8 | 15 | 10 | 14 | 10 | | | 14 | 8 | Ret | 18 | 10 | Ret | 32 |
| 19 | (Finland) Mika Salo | 6 | 16 | | | | | | | | | 5 | 3 | | | | | 30 |
| | (Brazil) Christian Fittipaldi | | | 5 | 4 | | | | | | | | | | | Ret | 5 | 30 |
| 21 | (Italy) Andrea Boffo | 19 | 9 | 8 | 3 | 17 | 8 | Ret | 16 | | | | | | | | | 28 |
| 22 | (Italy) Giovanni Berton | | | | | | | | | | | | | 7 | 2 | 12 | Ret | 23 |
| 23 | (Italy) Andrea Bacci | | | | | | | | | | | | | 11 | 8 | 4 | Ret | 17 |
| | (Indonesia) Ananda Mikola | | | Ret | Ret | | | 8 | 4 | | | | | | | | | 17 |
| 25 | (Hungary) Norbert Michelisz | | | | | | | | | 3 | Ret | | | | | | | 14 |
| | (Italy) Franco Fumi | | | | | | | | | 9 | 4 | | | | | | | 14 |
| | (San Marino) Walter Meloni | 13 | 11 | 16 | 12 | 16 | 13 | 13 | 12 | 12 | Ret | 18 | 13 | 15 | 15 | | | 14 |
| 28 | (Italy) Simone Iacone | | | | | | | | | | | | | | | Ret | 4 | 12 |
| 29 | (Italy) Domenico Ferlito | | | | | | | | | 8 | 11 | 15 | 10 | 12 | 10 | | | 11 |
| 30 | (Italy) Sandro Bettini | 11 | Ret | 14 | 10 | 14 | 12 | Ret | DNS | | | | | | | | | 8 |
| 31 | (United Kingdom) Jeff Smith | | | | | | | | | | | 13 | 7 | | | | | 6 |
| | (Italy) Francesco Ascani | DNS | DNS | 18 | Ret | | | 12 | 11 | | | | | 13 | 13 | | | 6 |
| | (Italy) Leonardo Baccarelli | 14 | 12 | DNS | DNS | | | Ret | 13 | | | | | Ret | 16 | | | 6 |
| 34 | (Italy) Giancarlo Fisichella | | | | | | | | | | | | | 8 | 11 | | | 5 |
| | (Italy) Ezio Muccio | | | | | | | | | | | | | | | Ret | 8 | 5 |
| | (Italy) Gianni Giudici | | | Ret | DNS | | | Ret | DNS | 11 | Ret | | | 16 | DNS | | | 5 |
| 37 | (Italy) Marco Fumagalli | 15 | | | 13 | | | 15 | | | | | | | | | | 3 |
| 38 | (Italy) Andrea Perlini | | 13 | 15 | | | | | DNS | | | | | | | | | 2 |
| | (Italy) Marco Pollara | | | | | | | | | | | | | | | 14 | Ret | 2 |
| | (Italy) Niccolò Mercatali | 18 | Ret | | | | | | | | | | | | | | | 2 |
| | (United Kingdom) Tom Onslow-Cole | | | | | 18 | Ret | | | | | | | | | | | 2 |
| | (Italy) Gian Maria Gabbiani | Ret | Ret | | | | | | | | | | | | | | | 2 |
| | (Italy) Michele Faccin | | | | | | | | | | | | | Ret | Ret | | | 2 |
| 44 | (Italy) Luca Rangoni | | | | | | | | | | | 12 | | | | | | 1 |
| | (Italy) Alessandro Garofano | | | | | | | | | | | | 12 | | | | | 1 |
| | (Italy) Riccardo Bossi | Ret | DNS | | | | | | | | | | | | | | | 1 |
| 47 | (Italy) Simone Monforte | DNS | DNS | | | | | | | | | | | | | | | 0 |
| | (Italy) Alessandro Battaglin | | | | | | | | | | | | | DNS | DNS | | | 0 |
| Pos | Driver | MNZ (Italy) | | IMO (Italy) | | DON (United Kingdom) | | MUG (Italy) | | HUN (Hungary) | | SPA (Belgium) | | VAL (Italy) | | PER (Italy) | | Pts |

| Colour | Result |
|---|---|
| Gold | Winner |
| Silver | Second place |
| Bronze | Third place |
| Green | Points classification |
| Blue | Non-points classification |
| Blue | Non-classified finish (NC) |
| Purple | Retired, not classified (Ret) |
| Red | Did not qualify (DNQ) |
| Red | Did not pre-qualify (DNPQ) |
| Black | Disqualified (DSQ) |
| White | Did not start (DNS) |
| White | Withdrew (WD) |
| White | Race cancelled (C) |
| Blank | Did not practice (DNP) |
| Blank | Did not arrive (DNA) |
| Blank | Excluded (EX) |

**Bold** – Pole
Italics – Fastest Lap

=== International Superstars Series – Teams ===
| Pos | Team | Manufacturer | Points |
|---|---|---|---|
| 1 | (Italy) Dinamic | BMW | 276 |
| 2 | (Italy) CAAL Racing | Mercedes-Benz | 222 |
| 3 | (Sweden) Audi Sport KMS | Audi | 185 |
| 4 | (Switzerland) Swiss Team | Maserati | 169 |
| 5 | (Italy) Romeo Ferraris | Mercedes-Benz | 167 |
| 6 | (Italy) Audi Sport Italia | Audi | 128 |
| 7 | (Switzerland) Solaris Motorsport | Chevrolet | 104 |
| 8 | (Italy) Roma Racing Team | Mercedes-Benz | 96 |
| 9 | (Italy) Ferlito Motors | Jaguar | 84 |
| 10 | (Germany) Audi MTM Motorsport | Audi | 71 |
| 11 | (San Marino) W&D Racing Team | BMW | 48 |
| 12 | (Italy) Scuderia Giudici | BMW | 25 |
| 13 | (Italy) Todi Corse | BMW | 14 |
| 14 | (Italy) MRT by Nocentini | Chrysler, Lexus | 4 |
