= 2012 Superstars Series Hungaroring round =

(Hungary) 2012 Superstars Series Hungaroring round
Round details
- Round 5 of 8 rounds in the 2012 Superstars Series
- Layout of the Hungaroring
- Location: Hungaroring, Mogyoród, Hungary
- Course: Permanent racing facility 4.381 km (2.722 mi)

Superstars Series

Race 1
- Date: 1 July 2012
- Laps: 14

Pole position
Driver	(Italy) Vitantonio Liuzzi	CAAL Racing
- Time: 1:52.513

Podium
First	(Italy) Vitantonio Liuzzi	CAAL Racing
Second	(Italy) Thomas Biagi	Dinamic Motorsport
Third	(Hungary) Norbert Michelisz	Scuderia Giudici

Fastest lap
Driver	(Sweden) Johan Kristoffersson	Audi Sport KMS
- Time: 1:54.976 (on lap 11)

Race 2
- Date: 1 July 2012
- Laps: 14

Podium
First	(Austria) Christian Klien	Swiss Team
Second	(Italy) Vitantonio Liuzzi	CAAL Racing
Third	(Italy) Thomas Biagi	Dinamic Motorsport

Fastest lap
Driver	(Italy) Thomas Biagi	Dinamic Motorsport
- Time: 1:55.559 (on lap 7)

The 2012 Superstars Series Hungaroring round was the fifth round of the 2012 Superstars Series season. It took place on 1 July at the Hungaroring.

Vitantonio Liuzzi won the first race, starting from pole position, driving a Mercedes C63 AMG, and Christian Klien gained the second one, driving a Maserati Quattroporte.

== Classification ==
=== Qualifying ===
Pos.	No.	Driver	Car	Team	Time	Grid
1	54	(Italy) Vitantonio Liuzzi	Mercedes C63 AMG	(Italy) CAAL Racing	1:52.513	1
2	43	(Hungary) Norbert Michelisz	BMW M3 E92	(Italy) Scuderia Giudici	1:52.941	2
3	45	(Italy) Gianni Morbidelli	Audi RS5	(Italy) Audi Sport Italia	1:53.174	3
4	47	(Germany) Thomas Schöffler	Audi RS5	(Germany) MTM Motorsport	1:53.285	4
5	3	(Italy) Thomas Biagi	BMW M3 E92	(Italy) Dinamic Motorsport	1:53.301	5
6	1	(Austria) Christian Klien	Maserati Quattroporte	(Switzerland) Swiss Team	1:53.413	6
7	46	(Sweden) Johan Kristoffersson	Audi RS5	(Sweden) Audi Sport KMS	1:53.528	7
8	6	(Italy) Stefano Gabellini	BMW M3 E92	(Italy) Dinamic Motorsport	1:53.933	8
9	30	(Colombia) Camilo Zurcher	Mercedes C63 AMG	(Italy) Romeo Ferraris	1:54.227	9
10	18	(Italy) Massimo Pigoli	Jaguar XFR	(Italy) Ferlito Motors	1:54.498	12^{1}
11	12	(Italy) Francesco Sini	Chevrolet Lumina CR8	(Italy) Solaris Motorsport	1:54.500	10
12	99	(Italy) Andrea Larini	Mercedes C63 AMG	(Italy) Romeo Ferraris	1:54.747	14^{1}
13	9	(San Marino) Paolo Meloni	BMW M3 E90	(San Marino) W&D Racing Team	1:54.890	11
14	4	(Italy) Franco Fumi	BMW M3 E92	(Italy) Dinamic Motorsport	1:55.268	13
15	19	(Italy) Domenico Ferlito	Jaguar XFR	(Italy) Ferlito Motors	1:55.272	15
16	2	(Italy) Mauro Cesari	Maserati Quattroporte	(Switzerland) Swiss Team	no time	16
17	33	(Italy) Gianni Giudici	BMW M3 E92	(Italy) Scuderia Giudici	no time	17
18	10	(San Marino) Walter Meloni	BMW M3 E90	(San Marino) W&D Racing Team	no time	18
19	58	(Italy) Massimiliano Mugelli	Mercedes C63 AMG	(Italy) CAAL Racing	no time	19

Notes:

- ^1 – Massimo Pigoli and Andrea Larini were given a two-place grid penalty for causing a collision with Johnny Herbert in the Mugello round.

=== Race 1 ===
Pos.	No.	Driver	Car	Team	Laps	Time/Retired	Grid	Points
1	54	(Italy) Vitantonio Liuzzi	Mercedes C63 AMG	(Italy) CAAL Racing	14	27:05.669	1	21+1
2	3	(Italy) Thomas Biagi	BMW M3 E92	(Italy) Dinamic Motorsport	14	+0.539	5	16
3	43	(Hungary) Norbert Michelisz	BMW M3 E92	(Italy) Scuderia Giudici	14	+3.544	2	13
4	1	(Austria) Christian Klien	Maserati Quattroporte	(Switzerland) Swiss Team	14	+5.935	6	11
5	46	(Sweden) Johan Kristoffersson	Audi RS5	(Sweden) Audi Sport KMS	14	+10.664	7	9+1
6	30	(Colombia) Camilo Zurcher	Mercedes C63 AMG	(Italy) Romeo Ferraris	14	+24.533	9	7
7	99	(Italy) Andrea Larini	Mercedes C63 AMG	(Italy) Romeo Ferraris	14	+48.891	14	5
8	19	(Italy) Domenico Ferlito	Jaguar XFR	(Italy) Ferlito Motors	14	+49.144	15	4
9	4	(Italy) Franco Fumi	BMW M3 E92	(Italy) Dinamic Motorsport	14	+49.173	13	3
10	47	(Germany) Thomas Schöffler	Audi RS5	(Germany) MTM Motorsport	14	+57.591	4	2
11	33	(Italy) Gianni Giudici	BMW M3 E92	(Italy) Scuderia Giudici	14	+1:14.776	17	1
12	10	(San Marino) Walter Meloni	BMW M3 E90	(San Marino) W&D Racing Team	14	+1:52.213	18	1
13	45	(Italy) Gianni Morbidelli	Audi RS5	(Italy) Audi Sport Italia	11	Retired	3	1
14	12	(Italy) Francesco Sini	Chevrolet Lumina CR8	(Italy) Solaris Motorsport	10	Retired	10	1
15	9	(San Marino) Paolo Meloni	BMW M3 E90	(San Marino) W&D Racing Team	9	Retired	11	1
Ret	6	(Italy) Stefano Gabellini	BMW M3 E92	(Italy) Dinamic Motorsport	3	Retired	8	1
Ret	18	(Italy) Massimo Pigoli	Jaguar XFR	(Italy) Ferlito Motors	3	Retired	12	1
DNS	2	(Italy) Mauro Cesari	Maserati Quattroporte	(Switzerland) Swiss Team		Did not start	16	
DNS	58	(Italy) Massimiliano Mugelli	Mercedes C63 AMG	(Italy) CAAL Racing		Did not start	19	

=== Race 2 ===
Pos.	No.	Driver	Car	Team	Laps	Time/Retired	Grid	Points
1	1	(Austria) Christian Klien	Maserati Quattroporte	(Switzerland) Swiss Team	14	27:20.926	5	21
2	54	(Italy) Vitantonio Liuzzi	Mercedes C63 AMG	(Italy) CAAL Racing	14	+9.777	8	16
3	3	(Italy) Thomas Biagi	BMW M3 E92	(Italy) Dinamic Motorsport	14	+12.098^{2}	7	13+1
4	4	(Italy) Franco Fumi	BMW M3 E92	(Italy) Dinamic Motorsport	14	+14.547	9	11
5	6	(Italy) Stefano Gabellini	BMW M3 E92	(Italy) Dinamic Motorsport	14	+16.574	16	9
6	30	(Colombia) Camilo Zurcher	Mercedes C63 AMG	(Italy) Romeo Ferraris	14	+20.142^{3}	3	7
7	9	(San Marino) Paolo Meloni	BMW M3 E90	(San Marino) W&D Racing Team	14	+21.332	15	5
8	12	(Italy) Francesco Sini	Chevrolet Lumina CR8	(Italy) Solaris Motorsport	14	+23.473	14	4
9	99	(Italy) Andrea Larini	Mercedes C63 AMG	(Italy) Romeo Ferraris	14	+41.396	2	3
10	47	(Germany) Thomas Schöffler	Audi RS5	(Germany) MTM Motorsport	10	Retired	10	2
11	19	(Italy) Domenico Ferlito	Jaguar XFR	(Italy) Ferlito Motors	8	Retired	1	1
Ret	10	(San Marino) Walter Meloni	BMW M3 E90	(San Marino) W&D Racing Team	6	Retired	12	1
Ret	43	(Hungary) Norbert Michelisz	BMW M3 E92	(Italy) Scuderia Giudici	5	Retired	6	1
Ret	33	(Italy) Gianni Giudici	BMW M3 E92	(Italy) Scuderia Giudici	5	Retired	11	1
Ret	45	(Italy) Gianni Morbidelli	Audi RS5	(Italy) Audi Sport Italia	4	Retired	13	1
Ret	46	(Sweden) Johan Kristoffersson	Audi RS5	(Sweden) Audi Sport KMS	0	Retired	4	1
DNS	18	(Italy) Massimo Pigoli	Jaguar XFR	(Italy) Ferlito Motors		Did not start	17	
DNS	2	(Italy) Mauro Cesari	Maserati Quattroporte	(Switzerland) Swiss Team		Did not start	18	
DNS	58	(Italy) Massimiliano Mugelli	Mercedes C63 AMG	(Italy) CAAL Racing		Did not start	19	

Notes:

- ^2 – Thomas Biagi was given an 8-second penalty for causing a collision with Vitantonio Liuzzi.
- ^3 – Camilo Zurcher was given a 30-second penalty for causing a collision with Domenico Ferlito.

== Standings after the event ==
International Series standings

	Pos	Driver	Points
2	1	(Italy) Vitantonio Liuzzi	120
	2	(Italy) Thomas Biagi	114
2	3	(Sweden) Johan Kristoffersson	112
	4	(Italy) Andrea Larini	78
	5	(Italy) Francesco Sini	71

Teams' Championship standings

	Pos	Driver	Points
	1	(Italy) Dinamic Motorsport	181
1	2	(Italy) CAAL Racing	132
1	3	(Switzerland) Swiss Team	116
2	4	(Sweden) Audi Sport KMS	112
	5	(Italy) Romeo Ferraris	94

- Note: Only the top five positions are included for both sets of drivers' standings.
