= 2012 Superstars Series Monza round =

(Italy) 2012 Superstars Series Monza round
Round details
- Round 1 of 8 rounds in the 2012 Superstars Series
- Layout of the Autodromo Nazionale Monza
- Location: Autodromo Nazionale Monza, Monza, Italy
- Course: Permanent racing facility 5.793 km (3.600 mi)

Superstars Series

Race 1
- Date: 1 April 2012
- Laps: 13

Pole position
Driver	(Italy) Massimo Pigoli	Ferlito Motors
- Time: 1:55.962

Podium
First	(Italy) Massimo Pigoli	Ferlito Motors
Second	(Italy) Andrea Larini	Romeo Ferraris
Third	(Italy) Vitantonio Liuzzi	CAAL Racing

Fastest lap
Driver	(Italy) Andrea Larini	Romeo Ferraris
- Time: 1:56.733^{1} (on lap 3)

Race 2
- Date: 1 April 2012
- Laps: 13

Podium
First	(Italy) Vitantonio Liuzzi	CAAL Racing
Second	(Italy) Massimo Pigoli	Ferlito Motors
Third	(Italy) Francesco Sini	Solaris Motorsport

Fastest lap
Driver	(Italy) Francesco Sini	Solaris Motorsport
- Time: 1:56.198 (on lap 12)

The 2012 Superstars Series Monza round was the first round of the 2012 Superstars Series season. It took place on 1 April at the Autodromo Nazionale Monza.

Massimo Pigoli won the first race, starting from pole position, driving a Jaguar XFR, and Vitantonio Liuzzi gained the second one, driving a Mercedes C63 AMG.

== Classification ==
=== Qualifying ===
Pos.	No.	Driver	Car	Team	Time	Grid
1	18	(Italy) Massimo Pigoli	Jaguar XFR	(Italy) Ferlito Motors	1:55.962	1
2	99	(Italy) Andrea Larini	Mercedes C63 AMG	(Italy) Romeo Ferraris	1:56.183	2
3	3	(Italy) Thomas Biagi	BMW M3 E92	(Italy) Dinamic Motorsport	1:56.509	3
4	1	(Finland) Mika Salo	Maserati Quattroporte	(Switzerland) Swiss Team	1:56.516	4
5	6	(Italy) Stefano Gabellini	BMW M3 E92	(Italy) Dinamic Motorsport	1:56.669	5
6	28	(Italy) Andrea Boffo	Mercedes C63 AMG	(Italy) Roma Racing Team	1:56.676	6
7	27	(Italy) Domenico Caldarola	Mercedes C63 AMG	(Italy) Roma Racing Team	1:56.864	7
8	19	(Italy) Gian Maria Gabbiani	Jaguar XFR	(Italy) Ferlito Motors	1:56.935	8
9	12	(Italy) Francesco Sini	Chevrolet Lumina CR8	(Italy) Solaris Motorsport	1:57.515	9
10	58	(Italy) Massimiliano Mugelli	Mercedes C63 AMG	(Italy) CAAL Racing	1:57.768	10
11	47	(Germany) Thomas Schöffler	Audi RS4	(Germany) MTM Motorsport	1:58.271	11
12	2	(Italy) Mauro Cesari	Maserati Quattroporte	(Switzerland) Swiss Team	1:58.294	12
13	9	(San Marino) Paolo Meloni	BMW M3 E90	(San Marino) W&D Racing Team	1:58.333	13
14	46	(Sweden) Johan Kristoffersson	Audi RS5	(Sweden) Audi Sport KMS	1:59.456	14
15	22	(Italy) Niccolò Mercatali	Chrysler 300C SRT8	(Italy) MRT by Nocentini	1:59.663	15
16	10	(San Marino) Walter Meloni	BMW M3 E90	(San Marino) W&D Racing Team	2:00.528	16
17	4	(Italy) Sandro Bettini	BMW M3 E92	(Italy) Dinamic Motorsport	2:01.827	17
18	33	(Italy) Riccardo Bossi	BMW M3 E92	(Italy) Scuderia Giudici	2:02.618	18
19	56	(Italy) Leonardo Baccarelli	BMW 550i E60	(Italy) Todi Corse	2:02.907	19
20	43	(Italy) Marco Fumagalli (Italy) Andrea Perlini	BMW 550i E60	(Italy) Scuderia Giudici	2:05.773	20
21	23	(Italy) Simone Monforte	Lexus ISF	(Italy) MRT by Nocentini	2:07.914	21
22	54	(Italy) Vitantonio Liuzzi	Mercedes C63 AMG	(Italy) CAAL Racing	3:26.143	22
23	45	(Italy) Gianni Morbidelli	Audi RS5	(Italy) Audi Sport Italia	no time	23
24	8	(Italy) Francesco Ascani	BMW M3 E90	(Italy) Todi Corse	no time	24

=== Race 1 ===
Pos.	No.	Driver	Car	Team	Laps	Time/Retired	Grid	Points
1	18	(Italy) Massimo Pigoli	Jaguar XFR	(Italy) Ferlito Motors	13	28:35.422	1	21+1
2	99	(Italy) Andrea Larini	Mercedes C63 AMG	(Italy) Romeo Ferraris	13	+0.414	2	16+1
3	54	(Italy) Vitantonio Liuzzi	Mercedes C63 AMG	(Italy) CAAL Racing	13	+1.243	22	13
4	3	(Italy) Thomas Biagi	BMW M3 E92	(Italy) Dinamic Motorsport	13	+3.671	3	11
5	46	(Sweden) Johan Kristoffersson	Audi RS5	(Sweden) Audi Sport KMS	13	+3.699	14	9
6	1	(Finland) Mika Salo	Maserati Quattroporte	(Switzerland) Swiss Team	13	+3.969	4	7
7	45	(Italy) Gianni Morbidelli	Audi RS5	(Italy) Audi Sport Italia	13	+7.010	23	5
8	27	(Italy) Domenico Caldarola	Mercedes C63 AMG	(Italy) Roma Racing Team	13	+8.823	7	4
9	58	(Italy) Massimiliano Mugelli	Mercedes C63 AMG	(Italy) CAAL Racing	13	+26.918	10	3
10	9	(San Marino) Paolo Meloni	BMW M3 E90	(San Marino) W&D Racing Team	13	+27.276^{2}	13	2
11	4	(Italy) Sandro Bettini	BMW M3 E92	(Italy) Dinamic Motorsport	13	+31.037	17	1
12	47	(Germany) Thomas Schöffler	Audi RS4	(Germany) MTM Motorsport	13	+34.137	11	1
13	10	(San Marino) Walter Meloni	BMW M3 E90	(San Marino) W&D Racing Team	13	+43.780	16	1
14	56	(Italy) Leonardo Baccarelli	BMW 550i E60	(Italy) Todi Corse	13	+46.135	19	1
15	43	(Italy) Marco Fumagalli	BMW 550i E60	(Italy) Scuderia Giudici	13	+1:58.564	20	1
16	2	(Italy) Mauro Cesari	Maserati Quattroporte	(Switzerland) Swiss Team	9	Retired	12	1
17	6	(Italy) Stefano Gabellini	BMW M3 E92	(Italy) Dinamic Motorsport	8	Retired	5	1
18	22	(Italy) Niccolò Mercatali	Chrysler 300C SRT8	(Italy) MRT by Nocentini	8	Retired	15	1
19	28	(Italy) Andrea Boffo	Mercedes C63 AMG	(Italy) Roma Racing Team	7	Retired	6	1
Ret	33	(Italy) Riccardo Bossi	BMW M3 E92	(Italy) Scuderia Giudici	3	Retired	18	1
Ret	12	(Italy) Francesco Sini	Chevrolet Lumina CR8	(Italy) Solaris Motorsport	2	Retired	9	1
Ret	19	(Italy) Gian Maria Gabbiani	Jaguar XFR	(Italy) Ferlito Motors	0	Retired	8	1
DNS	23	(Italy) Simone Monforte	Lexus ISF	(Italy) MRT by Nocentini		Did not start	21	
DNS	8	(Italy) Francesco Ascani	BMW M3 E90	(Italy) Todi Corse		Did not start	24	

Notes:

- ^1 – Massimo Pigoli's fastest lap was deleted due to a track cutting.
- ^2 – Paolo Meloni was given a 3-second penalty for causing a collision with Massimiliano Mugelli.

=== Race 2 ===
Pos.	No.	Driver	Car	Team	Laps	Time/Retired	Grid	Points
1	54	(Italy) Vitantonio Liuzzi	Mercedes C63 AMG	(Italy) CAAL Racing	13	26:58.452	6	21
2	18	(Italy) Massimo Pigoli	Jaguar XFR	(Italy) Ferlito Motors	13	+1.153	8	16
3	12	(Italy) Francesco Sini	Chevrolet Lumina CR8	(Italy) Solaris Motorsport	13	+1.602	21	13+1
4	3	(Italy) Thomas Biagi	BMW M3 E92	(Italy) Dinamic Motorsport	13	+3.190	5	11
5	45	(Italy) Gianni Morbidelli	Audi RS5	(Italy) Audi Sport Italia	13	+3.219	2	9
6	27	(Italy) Domenico Caldarola	Mercedes C63 AMG	(Italy) Roma Racing Team	13	+4.816	1	7
7	99	(Italy) Andrea Larini	Mercedes C63 AMG	(Italy) Romeo Ferraris	13	+5.468	7	5
8	6	(Italy) Stefano Gabellini	BMW M3 E92	(Italy) Dinamic Motorsport	13	+8.996	17	4
9	28	(Italy) Andrea Boffo	Mercedes C63 AMG	(Italy) Roma Racing Team	13	+9.391	19	3
10	2	(Italy) Mauro Cesari	Maserati Quattroporte	(Switzerland) Swiss Team	13	+14.505	16	2
11	10	(San Marino) Walter Meloni	BMW M3 E90	(San Marino) W&D Racing Team	13	+21.687	13	1
12	58	(Italy) Leonardo Baccarelli	BMW 550i E60	(Italy) Todi Corse	13	+22.243	14	1
13	43	(Italy) Andrea Perlini	BMW 550i E60	(Italy) Scuderia Giudici	13	+45.792	15	1
14	58	(Italy) Massimiliano Mugelli	Mercedes C63 AMG	(Italy) CAAL Racing	11	Retired	9	1
15	9	(San Marino) Paolo Meloni	BMW M3 E90	(San Marino) W&D Racing Team	10	Retired	10	1
16	1	(Finland) Mika Salo	Maserati Quattroporte	(Switzerland) Swiss Team	8	Retired	3	1
Ret	47	(Germany) Thomas Schöffler	Audi RS4	(Germany) MTM Motorsport	5	Retired	12	1
Ret	46	(Sweden) Johan Kristoffersson	Audi RS5	(Sweden) Audi Sport KMS	1	Retired	4	1
Ret	19	(Italy) Gian Maria Gabbiani	Jaguar XFR	(Italy) Ferlito Motors	1	Retired	22	1
Ret	4	(Italy) Sandro Bettini	BMW M3 E92	(Italy) Dinamic Motorsport	0	Retired	11	1
Ret	22	(Italy) Niccolò Mercatali	Chrysler 300C SRT8	(Italy) MRT by Nocentini	0	Retired	18	1
DNS	33	(Italy) Riccardo Bossi	BMW M3 E92	(Italy) Scuderia Giudici		Did not start	20	
DNS	23	(Italy) Simone Monforte	Lexus ISF	(Italy) MRT by Nocentini		Did not start	23	
DNS	8	(Italy) Francesco Ascani	BMW M3 E90	(Italy) Todi Corse		Did not start	24	

== Standings after the event ==
International Series and Italian Championship standings

Pos	Driver	Points
1	(Italy) Massimo Pigoli	38
2	(Italy) Vitantonio Liuzzi	34
3	(Italy) Andrea Larini	22
4	(Italy) Thomas Biagi	22
5	(Italy) Francesco Sini	15

Teams' Championship standings

Pos	Driver	Points
1	(Italy) Ferlito Motors	40
2	(Italy) CAAL Racing	38
3	(Italy) Dinamic Motorsport	27
4	(Italy) Romeo Ferraris	22
5	(Italy) Solaris Motorsport	15

- Note: Only the top five positions are included for both sets of drivers' standings.
