= 2012 Superstars Series Vallelunga round =

(Italy) 2012 Superstars Series Vallelunga round
Round details
- Round 7 of 8 rounds in the 2012 Superstars Series
- Layout of the ACI Vallelunga Circuit
- Location: ACI Vallelunga Circuit, Campagnano di Roma, Italy
- Course: Permanent racing facility 4.085 km (2.538 mi)

Superstars Series

Race 1
- Date: 7 October 2012
- Laps: 16

Pole position
| Driver | (Sweden) Johan Kristoffersson | Audi Sport KMS |
- Time: 1:40.039

Podium
| First | (Sweden) Johan Kristoffersson | Audi Sport KMS |
| Second | (Germany) Thomas Schöffler | MTM Motorsport |
| Third | (Italy) Thomas Biagi | Dinamic Motorsport |

Fastest lap
| Driver | (Germany) Thomas Schöffler | MTM Motorsport |
- Time: 1:40.565 (on lap 2)

Race 2
- Date: 7 October 2012
- Laps: 16

Podium
| First | (Sweden) Johan Kristoffersson | Audi Sport KMS |
| Second | (Italy) Giovanni Berton | Dinamic Motorsport |
| Third | (Italy) Massimiliano Mugelli | Dinamic Motorsport |

Fastest lap
| Driver | (Sweden) Johan Kristoffersson | Audi Sport KMS |
- Time: 1:41.043

The 2012 Superstars Series Vallelunga round was the seventh round of the 2012 Superstars Series season. It took place on 7 October at the ACI Vallelunga Circuit.

Johan Kristoffersson won both races, driving an Audi RS5.

== Classification ==
=== Qualifying ===
| Pos. | No. | Driver | Car | Team | Time | Grid |
|---|---|---|---|---|---|---|
| 1 | 46 | (Sweden) Johan Kristoffersson | Audi RS5 | (Sweden) Audi Sport KMS | 1:40.039 | 1 |
| 2 | 45 | (Italy) Gianni Morbidelli | Audi RS5 | (Italy) Audi Sport Italia | 1:40.363 | 2 |
| 3 | 47 | (Germany) Thomas Schöffler | Audi RS5 | (Germany) MTM Motorsport | 1:40.645 | 3 |
| 4 | 54 | (Italy) Vitantonio Liuzzi | Mercedes C63 AMG | (Italy) CAAL Racing | 1:40.670 | 4 |
| 5 | 3 | (Italy) Thomas Biagi | BMW M3 E92 | (Italy) Dinamic Motorsport | 1:40.870 | 5 |
| 6 | 12 | (Italy) Francesco Sini | Chevrolet Lumina CR8 | (Italy) Solaris Motorsport | 1:40.977 | 6 |
| 7 | 4 | (Italy) Massimiliano Mugelli | BMW M3 E92 | (Italy) Dinamic Motorsport | 1:40.687 | 7 |
| 8 | 6 | (Italy) Giovanni Berton | BMW M3 E92 | (Italy) Dinamic Motorsport | 1:41.275 | 8 |
| 9 | 30 | (Colombia) Camilo Zurcher | Mercedes C63 AMG | (Italy) Romeo Ferraris | 1:41.398 | 9 |
| 10 | 1 | (Italy) Giancarlo Fisichella | Maserati Quattroporte | (Switzerland) Swiss Team | 1:41.415 | 10 |
| 11 | 27 | (Italy) Domenico Caldarola | Mercedes C63 AMG Coupé | (Italy) Roma Racing Team | 1:41.638 | 11 |
| 12 | 9 | (San Marino) Paolo Meloni | BMW M3 E90 | (San Marino) W&D Racing Team | 1:41.699 | 12 |
| 13 | 2 | (Italy) Mauro Cesari | Maserati Quattroporte | (Switzerland) Swiss Team | 1:41.708 | 13 |
| 14 | 99 | (Italy) Andrea Larini | Mercedes C63 AMG | (Italy) Romeo Ferraris | 1:41.943 | 14 |
| 15 | 19 | (Italy) Domenico Ferlito | Jaguar XFR | (Italy) Ferlito Motors | 1:41.964 | 15 |
| 16 | 18 | (Italy) Massimo Pigoli | Jaguar XFR | (Italy) Ferlito Motors | 1:42.021 | 16 |
| 17 | 58 | (Italy) Andrea Bacci | Mercedes C63 AMG | (Italy) CAAL Racing | 1:42.305 | 17 |
| 18 | 23 | (Italy) Michele Faccin | Lexus ISF | (Italy) MRT by Nocentini | 1:43.544 | 18 |
| 19 | 10 | (San Marino) Walter Meloni | BMW M3 E90 | (San Marino) W&D Racing Team | 1:43.600 | 19 |
| 20 | 8 | (Italy) Francesco Ascani | BMW M3 E90 | (Italy) Todi Corse | 1:43.947 | 20 |
| 21 | 33 | (Italy) Gianni Giudici | BMW M3 E92 | (Italy) Scuderia Giudici | 1:44.729 | 21 |
| 22 | 58 | (Italy) Leonardo Baccarelli | BMW 550i E60 | (Italy) Todi Corse | no time | 22 |
| 23 | 22 | (Italy) Alessandro Battaglin | Chrysler 300C SRT8 | (Italy) MRT by Nocentini | no time | 23 |

=== Race 1 ===
| Pos. | No. | Driver | Car | Team | Laps | Time/Retired | Grid | Points |
|---|---|---|---|---|---|---|---|---|
| 1 | 46 | (Sweden) Johan Kristoffersson | Audi RS5 | (Sweden) Audi Sport KMS | 16 | 27:35.276 | 1 | 21+1 |
| 2 | 47 | (Germany) Thomas Schöffler | Audi RS5 | (Germany) MTM Motorsport | 16 | +0.514 | 3 | 16+1 |
| 3 | 3 | (Italy) Thomas Biagi | BMW M3 E92 | (Italy) Dinamic Motorsport | 16 | +5.811 | 5 | 13 |
| 4 | 54 | (Italy) Vitantonio Liuzzi | Mercedes C63 AMG | (Italy) CAAL Racing | 16 | +9.313 | 4 | 11 |
| 5 | 30 | (Colombia) Camilo Zurcher | Mercedes C63 AMG | (Italy) Romeo Ferraris | 16 | +12.498 | 9 | 9 |
| 6 | 4 | (Italy) Massimiliano Mugelli | BMW M3 E92 | (Italy) Dinamic Motorsport | 16 | +13.169 | 7 | 7 |
| 7 | 6 | (Italy) Giovanni Berton | BMW M3 E92 | (Italy) Dinamic Motorsport | 16 | +13.789 | 8 | 5 |
| 8 | 1 | (Italy) Giancarlo Fisichella | Maserati Quattroporte | (Switzerland) Swiss Team | 16 | +14.580 | 10 | 4 |
| 9 | 9 | (San Marino) Paolo Meloni | BMW M3 E90 | (San Marino) W&D Racing Team | 16 | +18.733 | 12 | 3 |
| 10 | 2 | (Italy) Mauro Cesari | Maserati Quattroporte | (Switzerland) Swiss Team | 16 | +23.380 | 13 | 2 |
| 11 | 58 | (Italy) Andrea Bacci | Mercedes C63 AMG | (Italy) CAAL Racing | 16 | +40.813 | 17 | 1 |
| 12 | 19 | (Italy) Domenico Ferlito | Jaguar XFR | (Italy) Ferlito Motors | 16 | +40.899 | 15 | 1 |
| 13 | 8 | (Italy) Francesco Ascani | BMW M3 E90 | (Italy) Todi Corse | 16 | +41.611 | 20 | 1 |
| 14 | 99 | (Italy) Andrea Larini | Mercedes C63 AMG | (Italy) Romeo Ferraris | 16 | +42.292 | 14 | 1 |
| 15 | 10 | (San Marino) Walter Meloni | BMW M3 E90 | (San Marino) W&D Racing Team | 16 | +57.665 | 19 | 1 |
| 16 | 33 | (Italy) Gianni Giudici | BMW M3 E92 | (Italy) Scuderia Giudici | 16 | +1:31.083 | 21 | 1 |
| 17 | 12 | (Italy) Francesco Sini | Chevrolet Lumina CR8 | (Italy) Solaris Motorsport | 15 | +1 lap | 6 | 1 |
| 18 | 45 | (Italy) Gianni Morbidelli | Audi RS5 | (Italy) Audi Sport Italia | 14 | Retired | 2 | 1 |
| Ret | 27 | (Italy) Domenico Caldarola | Mercedes C63 AMG Coupé | (Italy) Roma Racing Team | 7 | Retired | 11 | 1 |
| Ret | 18 | (Italy) Massimo Pigoli | Jaguar XFR | (Italy) Ferlito Motors | 6 | Retired | 16 | 1 |
| Ret | 23 | (Italy) Michele Faccin | Lexus ISF | (Italy) MRT by Nocentini | 4 | Retired | 18 | 1 |
| Ret | 56 | (Italy) Leonardo Baccarelli | BMW 550i E60 | (Italy) Todi Corse | 4 | Retired | 22 | 1 |
| DNS | 22 | (Italy) Alessandro Battaglin | Chrysler 300C SRT8 | (Italy) MRT by Nocentini | | Did not start | 23 | |

=== Race 2 ===
| Pos. | No. | Driver | Car | Team | Laps | Time/Retired | Grid | Points |
|---|---|---|---|---|---|---|---|---|
| 1 | 46 | (Sweden) Johan Kristoffersson | Audi RS5 | (Sweden) Audi Sport KMS | 16 | 27:40.277 | 8 | 21+1 |
| 2 | 6 | (Italy) Giovanni Berton | BMW M3 E92 | (Italy) Dinamic Motorsport | 16 | +3.655 | 2 | 16 |
| 3 | 4 | (Italy) Massimiliano Mugelli | BMW M3 E92 | (Italy) Dinamic Motorsport | 16 | +7.034 | 3 | 13 |
| 4 | 47 | (Germany) Thomas Schöffler | Audi RS5 | (Germany) MTM Motorsport | 16 | +7.918 | 7 | 11 |
| 5 | 45 | (Italy) Gianni Morbidelli | Audi RS5 | (Italy) Audi Sport Italia | 16 | +8.252 | 18 | 9 |
| 6 | 3 | (Italy) Thomas Biagi | BMW M3 E92 | (Italy) Dinamic Motorsport | 16 | +8.660 | 6 | 7 |
| 7 | 54 | (Italy) Vitantonio Liuzzi | Mercedes C63 AMG | (Italy) CAAL Racing | 16 | +12.362 | 5 | 5 |
| 8 | 58 | (Italy) Andrea Bacci | Mercedes C63 AMG | (Italy) CAAL Racing | 16 | +29.142 | 11 | 4 |
| 9 | 99 | (Italy) Andrea Larini | Mercedes C63 AMG | (Italy) Romeo Ferraris | 16 | +34.687 | 14 | 3 |
| 10 | 19 | (Italy) Domenico Ferlito | Jaguar XFR | (Italy) Ferlito Motors | 16 | +36.632 | 12 | 2 |
| 11 | 1 | (Italy) Giancarlo Fisichella | Maserati Quattroporte | (Switzerland) Swiss Team | 16 | +37.800^{1} | 1 | 1 |
| 12 | 2 | (Italy) Mauro Cesari | Maserati Quattroporte | (Switzerland) Swiss Team | 16 | +40.350 | 10 | 1 |
| 13 | 8 | (Italy) Francesco Ascani | BMW M3 E90 | (Italy) Todi Corse | 16 | +41.758 | 13 | 1 |
| 14 | 9 | (San Marino) Paolo Meloni | BMW M3 E90 | (San Marino) W&D Racing Team | 16 | +55.131^{2} | 9 | 1 |
| 15 | 10 | (San Marino) Walter Meloni | BMW M3 E90 | (San Marino) W&D Racing Team | 16 | +1:00.219 | 15 | 1 |
| 16 | 56 | (Italy) Leonardo Baccarelli | BMW 550i E60 | (Italy) Todi Corse | 16 | +1:20.803 | 22 | 1 |
| 17 | 12 | (Italy) Francesco Sini | Chevrolet Lumina CR8 | (Italy) Solaris Motorsport | 11 | Retired | 17 | 1 |
| 18 | 27 | (Italy) Domenico Caldarola | Mercedes C63 AMG Coupé | (Italy) Roma Racing Team | 8 | Retired | 19 | 1 |
| Ret | 23 | (Italy) Michele Faccin | Lexus ISF | (Italy) MRT by Nocentini | 7 | Retired | 21 | 1 |
| Ret | 30 | (Colombia) Camilo Zurcher | Mercedes C63 AMG | (Italy) Romeo Ferraris | 0 | Retired | 4 | 1 |
| DNS | 33 | (Italy) Gianni Giudici | BMW M3 E92 | (Italy) Scuderia Giudici | | Did not start | 16 | |
| DNS | 18 | (Italy) Massimo Pigoli | Jaguar XFR | (Italy) Ferlito Motors | | Did not start | 20 | |
| DNS | 22 | (Italy) Alessandro Battaglin | Chrysler 300C SRT8 | (Italy) MRT by Nocentini | | Did not start | 23 | |

Notes:

- ^1 – Giancarlo Fisichella was given a 25-second penalty for causing a collision with Camilo Zurcher.
- ^2 – Paolo Meloni was given a 25-second penalty for causing a collision with Francesco Sini.

== Standings after the event ==
International Series standings

| | Pos | Driver | Points |
|---|---|---|---|
| 1 | 1 | (Sweden) Johan Kristoffersson | 175 |
| 1 | 2 | (Italy) Vitantonio Liuzzi | 165 |
| | 3 | (Italy) Thomas Biagi | 147 |
| | 4 | (Italy) Gianni Morbidelli | 120 |
| | 5 | (Italy) Andrea Larini | 87 |

Italian Championship standings

| | Pos | Driver | Points |
|---|---|---|---|
| | 1 | (Sweden) Johan Kristoffersson | 114 |
| | 2 | (Italy) Thomas Biagi | 86 |
| 1 | 3 | (Italy) Vitantonio Liuzzi | 76 |
| 1 | 4 | (Italy) Andrea Larini | 69 |
| | 5 | (Italy) Francesco Sini | 55 |

Teams' Championship standings

| | Pos | Driver | Points |
|---|---|---|---|
| | 1 | (Italy) Dinamic Motorsport | 255 |
| | 2 | (Italy) CAAL Racing | 194 |
| 1 | 3 | (Sweden) Audi Sport KMS | 175 |
| 1 | 4 | (Switzerland) Swiss Team | 148 |
| 1 | 5 | (Italy) Romeo Ferraris | 121 |

- Note: Only the top five positions are included for both sets of drivers' standings.
