= 2012 Superstars Series Imola round =

(Italy) 2012 Superstars Series Imola round
Round details
- Round 2 of 8 rounds in the 2012 Superstars Series
- Layout of the Autodromo Enzo e Dino Ferrari
- Location: Autodromo Enzo e Dino Ferrari, Imola, Italy
- Course: Permanent racing facility 4.909 km (3.050 mi)

Superstars Series

Race 1
- Date: 22 April 2012
- Laps: 15

Pole position
Driver	(Sweden) Johan Kristoffersson	Audi Sport KMS
- Time: 1:49.548

Podium
First	(Sweden) Johan Kristoffersson	Audi Sport KMS
Second	(Italy) Andrea Larini	Romeo Ferraris
Third	(Italy) Thomas Biagi	Dinamic Motorsport

Fastest lap
Driver	(Italy) Gianni Morbidelli	Audi Sport Italia
- Time: 1:49.461 (on lap 6)

Race 2
- Date: 22 April 2012
- Laps: 15

Podium
First	(Sweden) Johan Kristoffersson	Audi Sport KMS
Second	(Italy) Thomas Biagi	Dinamic Motorsport
Third	(Italy) Andrea Boffo	Roma Racing Team

Fastest lap
Driver	(Italy) Gianni Morbidelli	Audi Sport Italia
- Time: 1:49.781 (on lap 9)

The 2012 Superstars Series Imola round was the second round of the 2012 Superstars Series season. It took place on 22 April at the Autodromo Enzo e Dino Ferrari.

Johan Kristoffersson won both races, driving an Audi RS5.

== Classification ==
=== Qualifying ===
Pos.	No.	Driver	Car	Team	Time	Grid
1	46	(Sweden) Johan Kristoffersson	Audi RS5	(Sweden) Audi Sport KMS	1:49.548	1
2	99	(Italy) Andrea Larini	Mercedes C63 AMG	(Italy) Romeo Ferraris	1:49.677	2
3	3	(Italy) Thomas Biagi	BMW M3 E92	(Italy) Dinamic Motorsport	1:49.759	3
4	45	(Italy) Gianni Morbidelli	Audi RS5	(Italy) Audi Sport Italia	1:49.825	4
5	54	(Italy) Vitantonio Liuzzi	Mercedes C63 AMG	(Italy) CAAL Racing	1:50.128	5
6	12	(Italy) Francesco Sini	Chevrolet Lumina CR8	(Italy) Solaris Motorsport	1:50.230	6
7	47	(Germany) Thomas Schöffler	Audi RS5	(Germany) MTM Motorsport	1:50.467	7
8	18	(Italy) Massimo Pigoli	Jaguar XFR	(Italy) Ferlito Motors	1:50.638	8
9	1	(Brazil) Christian Fittipaldi	Maserati Quattroporte	(Switzerland) Swiss Team	1:51.387	9
10	6	(Italy) Stefano Gabellini	BMW M3 E92	(Italy) Dinamic Motorsport	1:51.423	10
11	28	(Italy) Andrea Boffo	Mercedes C63 AMG	(Italy) Roma Racing Team	1:51.605	11
12	9	(San Marino) Paolo Meloni	BMW M3 E90	(San Marino) W&D Racing Team	1:51.815	12
13	19	(Indonesia) Ananda Mikola	Jaguar XFR	(Italy) Ferlito Motors	1:52.046	13
14	2	(Italy) Mauro Cesari	Maserati Quattroporte	(Switzerland) Swiss Team	1:52.544	14
15	58	(Italy) Massimiliano Mugelli	Mercedes C63 AMG	(Italy) CAAL Racing	1:52.619	15
16	4	(Italy) Sandro Bettini	BMW M3 E92	(Italy) Dinamic Motorsport	1:52.990	16
17	8	(Italy) Francesco Ascani	BMW M3 E90	(Italy) Todi Corse	1:53.924	17
18	33	(Italy) Gianni Giudici	BMW M3 E92	(Italy) Scuderia Giudici	1:55.453	18
19	10	(San Marino) Walter Meloni	BMW M3 E90	(San Marino) W&D Racing Team	1:55.468	19
20	43	(Italy) Marco Fumagalli (Italy) Andrea Perlini	BMW M3 E92	(Italy) Scuderia Giudici	1:55.564	20
21	27	(Italy) Domenico Caldarola	Mercedes C63 AMG	(Italy) Roma Racing Team	1:57.191	21
22	56	(Italy) Leonardo Baccarelli	BMW 550i E60	(Italy) Todi Corse	no time	22

=== Race 1 ===
Pos.	No.	Driver	Car	Team	Laps	Time/Retired	Grid	Points
1	46	(Sweden) Johan Kristoffersson	Audi RS5	(Sweden) Audi Sport KMS	15	27:39.500	1	21+1
2	99	(Italy) Andrea Larini	Mercedes C63 AMG	(Italy) Romeo Ferraris	15	+8.039	2	16
3	3	(Italy) Thomas Biagi	BMW M3 E92	(Italy) Dinamic Motorsport	15	+13.888	3	13
4	12	(Italy) Francesco Sini	Chevrolet Lumina CR8	(Italy) Solaris Motorsport	15	+20.293	6	11
5	1	(Brazil) Christian Fittipaldi	Maserati Quattroporte	(Switzerland) Swiss Team	15	+26.685	9	9
6	54	(Italy) Vitantonio Liuzzi	Mercedes C63 AMG	(Italy) CAAL Racing	15	+27.750	5	7
7	6	(Italy) Stefano Gabellini	BMW M3 E92	(Italy) Dinamic Motorsport	15	+28.478	10	5
8	28	(Italy) Andrea Boffo	Mercedes C63 AMG	(Italy) Roma Racing Team	15	+35.225	11	4
9	47	(Germany) Thomas Schöffler	Audi RS5	(Germany) MTM Motorsport	15	+35.706	7	3
10	18	(Italy) Massimo Pigoli	Jaguar XFR	(Italy) Ferlito Motors	15	+46.936	8	2
11	58	(Italy) Massimiliano Mugelli	Mercedes C63 AMG	(Italy) CAAL Racing	15	+49.622	15	1
12	2	(Italy) Mauro Cesari	Maserati Quattroporte	(Italy) Swiss Team	15	+49.889	14	1
13	9	(San Marino) Paolo Meloni	BMW M3 E90	(San Marino) W&D Racing Team	15	+51.226	12	1
14	4	(Italy) Sandro Bettini	BMW M3 E92	(Italy) Dinamic Motorsport	15	+51.346	16	1
15	43	(Italy) Andrea Perlini	BMW M3 E92	(Italy) Scuderia Giudici	15	+1:38.992	20	1
16	10	(San Marino) Walter Meloni	BMW M3 E90	(San Marino) W&D Racing Team	15	+1:39.799	19	1
17	45	(Italy) Gianni Morbidelli	Audi RS5	(Italy) Audi Sport Italia	14	Retired	4	1+1
18	8	(Italy) Francesco Ascani	BMW M3 E90	(Italy) Todi Corse	14	+1 lap	17	1
19	27	(Italy) Domenico Caldarola	Mercedes C63 AMG	(Italy) Roma Racing Team	10	Retired	21	1
20	33	(Italy) Gianni Giudici	BMW M3 E92	(Italy) Scuderia Giudici	10	Retired	18	1
Ret	19	(Indonesia) Ananda Mikola	Jaguar XFR	(Italy) Ferlito Motors	6	Retired	13	1
DNS	56	(Italy) Leonardo Baccarelli	BMW 550i E60	(Italy) Todi Corse		Did not start	22	

=== Race 2 ===
Pos.	No.	Driver	Car	Team	Laps	Time/Retired	Grid	Points
1	46	(Sweden) Johan Kristoffersson	Audi RS5	(Sweden) Audi Sport KMS	15	28:01.915	8	21
2	3	(Italy) Thomas Biagi	BMW M3 E92	(Italy) Dinamic Motorsport	15	+3.317	6	16
3	28	(Italy) Andrea Boffo	Mercedes C63 AMG	(Italy) Roma Racing Team	15	+11.956	1	13
4	1	(Brazil) Christian Fittipaldi	Maserati Quattroporte	(Switzerland) Swiss Team	15	+16.212	4	11
5	47	(Germany) Thomas Schöffler	Audi RS5	(Germany) MTM Motorsport	15	+16.479	9	9
6	6	(Italy) Stefano Gabellini	BMW M3 E92	(Italy) Dinamic Motorsport	15	+16.843	2	7
7	99	(Italy) Andrea Larini	Mercedes C63 AMG	(Italy) Romeo Ferraris	15	+20.931	7	5
8	27	(Italy) Domenico Caldarola	Mercedes C63 AMG	(Italy) Roma Racing Team	15	+27.620	19	4
9	2	(Italy) Mauro Cesari	Maserati Quattroporte	(Switzerland) Swiss Team	15	+31.994	12	3
10	4	(Italy) Sandro Bettini	BMW M3 E92	(Italy) Dinamic Motorsport	15	+32.324	14	2
11	9	(San Marino) Paolo Meloni	BMW M3 E90	(San Marino) W&D Racing Team	15	+33.483	13	1
12	10	(San Marino) Walter Meloni	BMW M3 E90	(San Marino) W&D Racing Team	15	+1:27.459	16	1
13	43	(Italy) Marco Fumagalli	BMW M3 E92	(Italy) Scuderia Giudici	15	+1:37.605	15	1
14	45	(Italy) Gianni Morbidelli	Audi RS5	(Italy) Audi Sport Italia	12	Retired	17	1+1
15	58	(Italy) Massimiliano Mugelli	Mercedes C63 AMG	(Italy) CAAL Racing	9	Retired	11	1
16	18	(Italy) Massimo Pigoli	Jaguar XFR	(Italy) Ferlito Motors	8	Retired	10	1
Ret	12	(Italy) Francesco Sini	Chevrolet Lumina CR8	(Italy) Solaris Motorsport	4	Retired	5	1
Ret	8	(Italy) Francesco Ascani	BMW M3 E90	(Italy) Todi Corse	4	Retired	18	1
Ret	54	(Italy) Vitantonio Liuzzi	Mercedes C63 AMG	(Italy) CAAL Racing	2	Retired	3	1
Ret	19	(Indonesia) Ananda Mikola	Jaguar XFR	(Italy) Ferlito Motors	0	Retired	21	1
DNS	33	(Italy) Gianni Giudici	BMW M3 E92	(Italy) Scuderia Giudici		Did not start	20	
DNS	56	(Italy) Leonardo Baccarelli	BMW 550i E60	(Italy) Todi Corse		Did not start	22	

== Standings after the event ==
International Series and Italian Championship standings

	Pos	Driver	Points
6	1	(Sweden) Johan Kristoffersson	53
2	2	(Italy) Thomas Biagi	51
	3	(Italy) Andrea Larini	43
2	4	(Italy) Vitantonio Liuzzi	42
4	5	(Italy) Massimo Pigoli	41

Teams' Championship standings

	Pos	Driver	Points
2	1	(Italy) Dinamic Motorsport	68
7	2	(Sweden) Audi Sport KMS	53
1	3	(Italy) CAAL Racing	48
3	4	(Italy) Ferlito Motors	45
1	5	(Italy) Romeo Ferraris	43

- Note: Only the top five positions are included for both sets of drivers' standings.
