= 2012 Superstars Series Donington round =

(United Kingdom) 2012 Superstars Series Donington round
Round details
- Round 3 of 8 rounds in the 2012 Superstars Series
- Layout of Donington Park
- Location: Donington Park, Castle Donington, United Kingdom
- Course: Permanent racing facility 4.023 km (2.498 mi)

Superstars Series

Race 1
- Date: 20 May 2012
- Laps: 17

Pole position
Driver	(Italy) Gianni Morbidelli	Audi Sport Italia
- Time: 1:33.264

Podium
First	(Italy) Gianni Morbidelli	Audi Sport Italia
Second	(Sweden) Johan Kristoffersson	Audi Sport KMS
Third	(United Kingdom) Johnny Herbert	Swiss Team

Fastest lap
Driver	(Italy) Gianni Morbidelli	Audi Sport Italia
- Time: 1:34.002 (on lap 10)

Race 2
- Date: 20 May 2012
- Laps: 15

Podium
First	(Italy) Gianni Morbidelli	Audi Sport Italia
Second	(Sweden) Johan Kristoffersson	Audi Sport KMS
Third	(Italy) Vitantonio Liuzzi	CAAL Racing

Fastest lap
Driver	(Italy) Gianni Morbidelli	Audi Sport Italia
- Time: 1:33.446 (on lap 9)

The 2012 Superstars Series Donington round was the third round of the 2012 Superstars Series season. It took place on 20 May at Donington Park.

Gianni Morbidelli won both races, driving an Audi RS5.

== Classification ==
=== Qualifying ===
Pos.	No.	Driver	Car	Team	Time	Grid
1	45	(Italy) Gianni Morbidelli	Audi RS5	(Italy) Audi Sport Italia	1:33.264	1
2	47	(Germany) Thomas Schöffler	Audi RS5	(Germany) MTM Motorsport	1:34.004	2
3	19	(United Kingdom) Tom Onslow-Cole	Jaguar XFR	(Italy) Ferlito Motors	1:34.833	3
4	1	(United Kingdom) Johnny Herbert	Maserati Quattroporte	(Switzerland) Swiss Team	1:34.924	4
5	18	(Italy) Massimo Pigoli	Jaguar XFR	(Italy) Ferlito Motors	1:35.058	5
6	54	(Italy) Vitantonio Liuzzi	Mercedes C63 AMG	(Italy) CAAL Racing	1:35.067	6
7	3	(Italy) Thomas Biagi	BMW M3 E92	(Italy) Dinamic Motorsport	1:35.194	7
8	6	(Italy) Stefano Gabellini	BMW M3 E92	(Italy) Dinamic Motorsport	1:35.293	8
9	12	(Italy) Francesco Sini	Chevrolet Lumina CR8	(Italy) Solaris Motorsport	1:35.454	9
10	28	(Italy) Andrea Boffo	Mercedes C63 AMG	(Italy) Roma Racing Team	1:35.873	10
11	99	(Italy) Andrea Larini	Mercedes C63 AMG	(Italy) Romeo Ferraris	1:35.932	11
12	58	(Italy) Massimiliano Mugelli	Mercedes C63 AMG	(Italy) CAAL Racing	1:36.140	12
13	27	(Italy) Domenico Caldarola	Mercedes C63 AMG	(Italy) Roma Racing Team	1:36.225	13
14	9	(San Marino) Paolo Meloni	BMW M3 E90	(San Marino) W&D Racing Team	1:36.436	14
15	2	(Italy) Mauro Cesari	Maserati Quattroporte	(Switzerland) Swiss Team	1:36.729	15
16	4	(Italy) Sandro Bettini	BMW M3 E92	(Italy) Dinamic Motorsport	1:36.931	16
17	10	(San Marino) Walter Meloni	BMW M3 E90	(San Marino) W&D Racing Team	1:39.413	17
18	45	(Sweden) Johan Kristoffersson	Audi RS5	(Sweden) Audi Sport KMS	no time	18

=== Race 1 ===
Pos.	No.	Driver	Car	Team	Laps	Time/Retired	Grid	Points
1	45	(Italy) Gianni Morbidelli	Audi RS5	(Italy) Audi Sport Italia	17	27:18.823	1	21+2
2	45	(Sweden) Johan Kristoffersson	Audi RS5	(Sweden) Audi Sport KMS	17	+6.971	18	16
3	1	(United Kingdom) Johnny Herbert	Maserati Quattroporte	(Switzerland) Swiss Team	17	+8.976	4	13
4	3	(Italy) Thomas Biagi	BMW M3 E92	(Italy) Dinamic Motorsport	17	+9.977	7	11
5	54	(Italy) Vitantonio Liuzzi	Mercedes C63 AMG	(Italy) CAAL Racing	17	+13.980	6	9
6	47	(Germany) Thomas Schöffler	Audi RS5	(Germany) MTM Motorsport	17	+14.195	2	7
7	6	(Italy) Stefano Gabellini	BMW M3 E92	(Italy) Dinamic Motorsport	17	+18.012	8	5
8	99	(Italy) Andrea Larini	Mercedes C63 AMG	(Italy) Romeo Ferraris	17	+18.759	11	4
9	18	(Italy) Massimo Pigoli	Jaguar XFR	(Italy) Ferlito Motors	17	+19.618	5	3
10	12	(Italy) Francesco Sini	Chevrolet Lumina CR8	(Italy) Solaris Motorsport	17	+20.886	9	2
11	58	(Italy) Massimiliano Mugelli	Mercedes C63 AMG	(Italy) CAAL Racing	17	+21.783	12	1
12	9	(San Marino) Paolo Meloni	BMW M3 E90	(San Marino) W&D Racing Team	17	+35.574	14	1
13	2	(Italy) Mauro Cesari	Maserati Quattroporte	(Switzerland) Swiss Team	17	+39.470	15	1
14	4	(Italy) Sandro Bettini	BMW M3 E92	(Italy) Dinamic Motorsport	17	+48.455	16	1
15	27	(Italy) Domenico Caldarola	Mercedes C63 AMG	(Italy) Roma Racing Team	17	+50.612	13	1
16	10	(San Marino) Walter Meloni	BMW M3 E90	(San Marino) W&D Racing Team	17	+1:24.504	17	1
17	28	(Italy) Andrea Boffo	Mercedes C63 AMG	(Italy) Roma Racing Team	15	+2 laps	10	1
18	19	(United Kingdom) Tom Onslow-Cole	Jaguar XFR	(Italy) Ferlito Motors	14	Retired	3	1

=== Race 2 ===
Pos.	No.	Driver	Car	Team	Laps	Time/Retired	Grid	Points
1	45	(Italy) Gianni Morbidelli	Audi RS5	(Italy) Audi Sport Italia	15	27:18.200	8	21+1
2	46	(Sweden) Johan Kristoffersson	Audi RS5	(Sweden) Audi Sport KMS	15	+3.469	7	16
3	54	(Italy) Vitantonio Liuzzi	Mercedes C63 AMG	(Italy) CAAL Racing	15	+13.893	4	13
4	12	(Italy) Francesco Sini	Chevrolet Lumina CR8	(Italy) Solaris Motorsport	15	+15.341	10	11
5	9	(San Marino) Paolo Meloni	BMW M3 E90	(San Marino) W&D Racing Team	15	+29.493	12	9
6	3	(Italy) Thomas Biagi	BMW M3 E92	(Italy) Dinamic Motorsport	15	+30.688	5	7
7	1	(United Kingdom) Johnny Herbert	Maserati Quattroporte	(Switzerland) Swiss Team	15	+32.472	6	5
8	28	(Italy) Andrea Boffo	Mercedes C63 AMG	(Italy) Roma Racing Team	15	+37.380	17	4
9	2	(Italy) Mauro Cesari	Maserati Quattroporte	(Switzerland) Swiss Team	15	+39.372	13	3
10	27	(Italy) Domenico Caldarola	Mercedes C63 AMG	(Italy) Roma Racing Team	15	+47.653	15	2
11	99	(Italy) Andrea Larini	Mercedes C63 AMG	(Italy) Romeo Ferraris	15	+1:01.501^{1}	1	1
12	4	(Italy) Sandro Bettini	BMW M3 E92	(Italy) Dinamic Motorsport	15	+1:06.434^{2}	14	1
13	10	(San Marino) Walter Meloni	BMW M3 E90	(San Marino) W&D Racing Team	15	+1:10.653	16	1
Ret	19	(United Kingdom) Tom Onslow-Cole	Jaguar XFR	(Italy) Ferlito Motors	6	Retired	18	1
Ret	58	(Italy) Massimiliano Mugelli	Mercedes C63 AMG	(Italy) CAAL Racing	1	Retired	11	1
Ret	6	(Italy) Stefano Gabellini	BMW M3 E92	(Italy) Dinamic Motorsport	0	Retired	2	1
Ret	47	(Germany) Thomas Schöffler	Audi RS5	(Germany) MTM Motorsport	0	Retired	3	1
Ret	18	(Italy) Massimo Pigoli	Jaguar XFR	(Italy) Ferlito Motors	0	Retired	9	1

Notes:

- ^1 – Andrea Larini was given a 25-second penalty for having a pit stop under the Safety Car.
- ^2 – Sandro Bettini was given a 25-second penalty for causing a collision with Mauro Cesari.

== Standings after the event ==
International Series standings

	Pos	Driver	Points
	1	(Sweden) Johan Kristoffersson	85
	2	(Italy) Thomas Biagi	69
1	3	(Italy) Vitantonio Liuzzi	64
5	4	(Italy) Gianni Morbidelli	63
2	5	(Italy) Andrea Larini	48

Teams' Championship standings

	Pos	Driver	Points
	1	(Italy) Dinamic Motorsport	92
	2	(Sweden) Audi Sport KMS	85
	3	(Italy) CAAL Racing	72
5	4	(Italy) Audi Sport Italia	63
2	5	(Switzerland) Swiss Team	57

- Note: Only the top five positions are included for both sets of drivers' standings.
