= 2013 Superstars Series =

Seasons
- ← 2012 2014 (EuroV8 Series) →

The 2013 Superstars Series was the tenth year and final season of the Superstars Series, an Italian-based touring car racing series, featuring the tenth edition of the Campionato Italiano Superstars (Italian Superstars Championship) and the seventh and final season year of the International Superstars Series. The season began at Monza on 7 April and finished at the ACI Vallelunga Circuit on 13 October, after eight rounds. Audi Sport Italia driver Gianni Morbidelli won both the Italian and International championships, with Mercedes-AMG Romeo Ferraris driver Vitantonio Liuzzi resulting runner-up.

== Teams and drivers ==
- All teams were Italian-registered and used Hankook tyres.

Team	Car	No.	Drivers	Rounds
Petri Corse	Porsche Panamera S	01	(Sweden) Johan Kristoffersson	1
Petri Corse	Porsche Panamera S	02	(Italy) Massimiliano Fantini	1–3
Petri Corse	Porsche Panamera S	02	(Italy) Nicola Larini	4–5
Petri Corse	Porsche Panamera S	07	(Italy) Fabrizio Giovanardi	2–5
Mercedes-AMG Romeo Ferraris	Mercedes C63 AMG	03	(Italy) Thomas Biagi	All
Mercedes-AMG Romeo Ferraris	Mercedes C63 AMG	15	(Italy) Vitantonio Liuzzi	All
Team BMW Dinamic	BMW M3 (E92)	04	(Italy) Giovanni Berton	1–8
Team BMW Dinamic	BMW M3 (E92)	05	(Italy) Max Mugelli	1–8
Team BMW Dinamic	BMW M3 (E92)	5	(Italy) Nicola Baldan	9
Team BMW Dinamic	BMW M3 (E92)	06	(Italy) Mauro Trentin	1–8
Team BMW Dinamic	BMW M3 (E92)	6	(Italy) Francesca Linossi	9
Todi Corse	BMW M3 (E90)	08	(Italy) Francesco Ascani	1, 3, 6, 8
Todi Corse	BMW 550i (E60)	56	(Colombia) Camilo Zurcher	7
Todi Corse	BMW 550i (E60)	56	(Italy) Mario Buscemi	8
Solaris Motorsport	Chevrolet Lumina CR8	10	(United Kingdom) John Quartermaine	6
Solaris Motorsport	Chevrolet Lumina CR8	11	(Italy) Domenico Schiattarella	4, 6, 8
Solaris Motorsport	Chevrolet Lumina CR8	12	(Italy) Francesco Sini	3
Solaris Motorsport	Chevrolet Camaro SS	12	(Italy) Francesco Sini	1–2, 4–8
RC Motorsport	Cadillac CTS-V	14	(Italy) Roberto Benedetti	1–4
RC Motorsport	Cadillac CTS-V	14	(Italy) Roberto Del Castello	6
RGA Sportmanship	BMW M3 (E92)	16	(Italy) Edoardo Piscopo	2
MRT by Nocentini	Lexus IS-F 500	22	(Italy) Diego Romanini	6
MRT by Nocentini	Lexus IS-F 500	22	(Italy) Alessandro Battaglin	1
Batt Promotion	Chrysler 300C SRT-8	23	(Italy) Alessandro Battaglin	2, 7
Roma Racing Team	Mercedes C63 AMG Coupé	27	(Italy) Luigi Ferrara	1–7
Roma Racing Team	Mercedes C63 AMG Coupé	27	(Italy) Giuseppe Cipriani	8
Roma Racing Team	Mercedes C63 AMG	28	(Italy) Marco Cassarà	4
Roma Racing Team	Mercedes C63 AMG	28	(Italy) Luca Rangoni	7
Scuderia Giudici	BMW M3 (E92)	33	(Italy) Gianni Giudici	1–2, 4–8
Scuderia Giudici	BMW M3 (E92)	43	(Austria) Christian Klien	2
Scuderia Giudici	BMW M3 (E92)	43	(Belgium) Renaud Kuppens	4
Scuderia Giudici	BMW M3 (E92)	43	(Italy) Marco Fumagalli	5
Scuderia Giudici	BMW M3 (E92)	43	(Italy) Andrea Perlini	5
Scuderia Giudici	BMW M3 (E92)	43	(United Kingdom) Colin Turkington	6
Adria Racing System	Audi RS4	35	(Italy) Alessandro Battaglin	5
Adria Racing System	Audi RS4	36	(Italy) Jonathan Giacon	5
Adria Racing System	Jaguar XFR	77	(Italy) "Diabolik"	3, 5
Adria Racing System	Jaguar XFR	99	(Italy) Andrea Larini	3
Adria Racing System	Jaguar XFR	99	(San Marino) Christian Montanari	5
Audi Sport Italia	Audi RS5	45	(Italy) Gianni Morbidelli	All
Audi Sport Italia	Audi RS5	46	(Italy) Ferdinando Geri	1–3
Audi Sport Italia	Audi RS5	46	(Belgium) Laurens Vanthoor	4
Audi Sport Italia	Audi RS5	46	(Italy) Davide di Benedetto	7
Audi Sport Italia	Audi RS5	46	(Italy) Andrea Larini	8
Audi Sport Italia	Audi RS5	46	(Italy) Ermanno Dionisio	9
Audi Sport Italia	Audi RS5	47	(Italy) Giuseppe Cipriani	7
CAAL Racing	Mercedes C63 AMG	54	(Italy) Andrea Bacci	1–8
CAAL Racing	Mercedes C63 AMG	58	(Italy) Leonardo Baccarelli	1, 3, 7–8
CAAL Racing	Mercedes C63 AMG	58	(Italy) Raffaele Giammaria	4
CAAL Racing	Mercedes C63 AMG	58	(Italy) Roberto Papini	6
Ferlito Motors	Jaguar XFR	77	(Italy) "Diabolik"	1–2
Ferlito Motors	Jaguar XFR	99	(Italy) Andrea Larini	1–2

== Calendar ==
Round	Circuit/Location	Date
1	(Italy) Autodromo Nazionale Monza	7 April
2	(Czech Republic) Brno Circuit	19 May
3	Automotodróm Slovakia Ring, Orechová Potôň	9 June
4	(Belgium) Circuit Zolder	23 June
5	(Portugal) Autódromo Internacional do Algarve, Portimão	21 July
6	(United Kingdom) Donington Park, Leicestershire	1 September
7	(Italy) Autodromo Enzo e Dino Ferrari, Imola	29 September
8	(Italy) Autodromo Vallelunga "Piero Taruffi", Campagnano	13 October
9	(Italy) Autodromo di Franciacorta, Castrezzato	27 October

International Superstars Series only
Campionato Italiano Superstars only
Both championships

== Results ==
Round		Circuit	Pole position	Fastest lap	Winning driver	Winning team
1	R1	Monza	(Italy) Vitantonio Liuzzi	(Italy) Vitantonio Liuzzi	(Italy) Vitantonio Liuzzi	Mercedes-AMG Romeo Ferraris
1	R2	Monza		(Italy) Vitantonio Liuzzi	(Italy) Thomas Biagi	Mercedes-AMG Romeo Ferraris
2	R1	Brno	(Italy) Thomas Biagi	(Italy) Thomas Biagi	(Italy) Thomas Biagi	Mercedes-AMG Romeo Ferraris
2	R2	Brno		(Italy) Giovanni Berton	(Italy) Giovanni Berton	Team BMW Dinamic
3	R1	Slovakia Ring	(Italy) Vitantonio Liuzzi	(Italy) Vitantonio Liuzzi	(Italy) Vitantonio Liuzzi	Mercedes-AMG Romeo Ferraris
3	R2	Slovakia Ring		(Italy) Luigi Ferrara	(Italy) Giovanni Berton	Team BMW Dinamic
4	R1	Zolder	(Italy) Gianni Morbidelli	(Belgium) Laurens Vanthoor	(Italy) Gianni Morbidelli	Audi Sport Italia
4	R2	Zolder		(Belgium) Laurens Vanthoor	(Italy) Gianni Morbidelli	Audi Sport Italia
5	R1	Algarve	(Italy) Luigi Ferrara	(Italy) Gianni Morbidelli	(Italy) Gianni Morbidelli	Audi Sport Italia
5	R2	Algarve		(Italy) Gianni Morbidelli	(Italy) Gianni Morbidelli	Audi Sport Italia
6	R1	Donington Park	(Italy) Luigi Ferrara	(Italy) Gianni Morbidelli	(Italy) Luigi Ferrara	Roma Racing Team
6	R2	Donington Park		(Italy) Gianni Morbidelli (Note: Thomas Biagi was the fastest of the original. However, Gianni Morbidelli was moved up in the vehicle violation of Romeo Ferraris.)	(Italy) Gianni Morbidelli	Audi Sport Italia
7	R1	Imola	(Italy) Luigi Ferrara	(Italy) Gianni Morbidelli	(Italy) Vitantonio Liuzzi	Mercedes-AMG Romeo Ferraris
7	R2	Imola		(Italy) Gianni Morbidelli	(Italy) Gianni Morbidelli	Audi Sport Italia
8	R1	Vallelunga	(Italy) Giovanni Berton	(Italy) Gianni Morbidelli	(Italy) Giovanni Berton	Team BMW Dinamic
8	R2	Vallelunga		(Italy) Gianni Morbidelli	(Italy) Andrea Larini	Larini (Audi Sport Italia)
9	R1	Franciacorta	(Italy) Gianni Morbidelli	(Italy) Gianni Morbidelli	(Italy) Gianni Morbidelli	Audi Sport Italia
9	R2	Franciacorta		(Italy) Gianni Morbidelli	(Italy) Gianni Morbidelli	Audi Sport Italia

== Championship standings ==
Scoring system

Position	1st	2nd	3rd	4th	5th	6th	7th	8th	9th	10th	Pole	Fastest Lap	Start
Points	20	15	12	10	8	6	4	3	2	1	1	1	1

=== Campionato Italiano Superstars ===
Pos	Driver	MNZ (Italy)		ALG (Portugal)		IMO (Italy)		VAL (Italy)		FRA (Italy)		Pts
1	(Italy) Gianni Morbidelli	4	4	1	1	2	1	3	7	**1**	1	170
2	(Italy) Vitantonio Liuzzi	**1**	2	2	2	1	2	5	4	3	2	158
3	(Italy) Giovanni Berton	6	8	5	5	5	6	**1**	2			83
4	(Italy) Thomas Biagi	2	1	3	4	13	7	10	6	DNS	DNS	76
5	(Italy) Luigi Ferrara	3	3	**7**	3	**3**	DNS					59
6	(Italy) Francesco Sini	5	6	6	13	8	3	7	3			59
7	(Italy) Max Mugelli	14	DNS	4	6	7	9	2	5			52
8	(Italy) Andrea Larini	8	Ret					4	1			37
9	(Italy) Andrea Bacci	7	5	11	8	6	8	14	11			32
10	(Italy) Ermanno Dionisio									3	2	29
11	(Italy) Mauro Trentin	9	12	8	7	Ret	12	8	8			23
12	(Italy) Nicola Baldan									4	4	22
13	(Italy) Davide di Benedetto					4	4					22
14	(Italy) Francesca Linossi									5	5	18
15	(Italy) Giuseppe Cipriani					9	5	DNS	DNS			12
16	(Italy) Francesco Ascani	12	9					9	9			10
17	(Italy) Domenico Schiattarella							6	Ret			8
18	(Italy) "Diabolik"	16	7	Ret	12							8
19	(Italy) Alessandro Battaglin	DNS	DNS	10	9	11	14					7
20	(Italy) Gianni Giudici	13	DNS	12	10	12	11	13	DNS			7
21	(Italy) Leonardo Baccarelli	10	11			14	13	12	DNS			6
22	(Italy) Jonathan Giacon			9	Ret							4
23	(Colombia) Camilo Zurcher					10	10					4
24	(Italy) Mario Buscemi							11	10			3
25	(Italy) Roberto Benedetti	11	10									3
26	(Italy) Ferdinando Geri	15	13									2
27	(Italy) Fabrizio Giovanardi			Ret	Ret							2
28	(Italy) Marco Fumagalli				11							1
29	(Italy) Andrea Perlini			13								1
30	(Italy) Massimiliano Fantini	DNS	Ret									1
31	(San Marino) Christian Montanari			Ret	DNS							1
	(Italy) Luca Rangoni					DNS	DNS					0
	(Italy) Nicola Larini			DNS	DNS							0
	(Sweden) Johan Kristoffersson	DNS	DNS									0
Pos	Driver	MNZ (Italy)		ALG (Portugal)		IMO (Italy)		VAL (Italy)		FRA (Italy)		Pts

Colour	Result
Gold	Winner
Silver	Second place
Bronze	Third place
Green	Points classification
Blue	Non-points classification
Blue	Non-classified finish (NC)
Purple	Retired, not classified (Ret)
Red	Did not qualify (DNQ)
Red	Did not pre-qualify (DNPQ)
Black	Disqualified (DSQ)
White	Did not start (DNS)
White	Withdrew (WD)
White	Race cancelled (C)
Blank	Did not practice (DNP)
Blank	Did not arrive (DNA)
Blank	Excluded (EX)

**Bold** – Pole
Italics – Fastest Lap

† – Drivers did not finish the race, but were classified as they completed over 50% of the race distance.

=== International Superstars Series – Drivers ===
Pos	Driver	MNZ (Italy)		BRN (Czech Republic)		SVK (Slovakia)		ZOL (Belgium)		ALG (Portugal)		DON (United Kingdom)		IMO (Italy)		VAL (Italy)		Pts
1	(Italy) Gianni Morbidelli	4	4	11	2	Ret	3	**1**	1	1	1	3	1	2	1	3	7	**235**
2	(Italy) Giovanni Berton	6	8	3	1	3	1	8	6	5	5	2	3	5	6	**1**	2	**192**
3	(Italy) Vitantonio Liuzzi	**1**	2	4	Ret	**1**	Ret	5	7	2	2	DSQ	DSQ	1	2	5	4	**159**^{†}
4	(Italy) Thomas Biagi	2	1	**1**	3	2	2	9	4	3	4	DSQ	DSQ	13	7	10	6	**138**^{†}
5	(Italy) Luigi Ferrara	3	3	2	10	11	4	3	Ret	**7**	3	**1**	Ret	**3**	DNS			**127**
6	(Italy) Max Mugelli	14	DNS	7	Ret	5	5	12	12	4	6	4	2	7	9	2	5	**105**
7	(Italy) Francesco Sini	5	6	6	11	10	7	Ret	DNS	6	13	Ret	DNS	8	3	7	3	**76**
8	(Italy) Andrea Bacci	7	5	9	4	7	6	13	11	11	8	5	10	6	8	14	11	**71**
9	(Italy) Mauro Trentin	9	12	Ret	7	6	8	14	9	8	7	6	4	Ret	12	8	8	**62**
10	(Italy) Andrea Larini	8	Ret	Ret	9	9	DNS									4	1	**44**
11	(Belgium) Laurens Vanthoor							2	2									**34**
12	(Italy) Fabrizio Giovanardi			5	Ret	4	14	7	8	Ret	Ret							**33**
13	(Italy) Davide di Benedetto													4	4			**22**
14	(Italy) Raffaele Giammaria							6	3									**20**
15	(Belgium) Renaud Kuppens							4	5									**20**
16	(Italy) Francesco Ascani	12	9			Ret	11					10	8			9	9	**18**
17	(Italy) Domenico Schiattarella							11	10			Ret	7			6	Ret	**17**
18	(Italy) "Diabolik"	16	7	8	Ret	Ret	9			Ret	12							**17**
19	(Italy) Gianni Giudici	13	DNS	DNS	DNS			Ret	DNS	12	10	7	9	12	11	13	DNS	**16**
20	(Italy) Roberto Benedetti	11	10	Ret	8	8	10	15	Ret									**16**
21	(United Kingdom) Colin Turkington											8	5					**13**
22	(Italy) Giuseppe Cipriani													9	5	DNS	DNS	**12**
23	(Italy) Edoardo Piscopo			Ret	5													**10**
24	(Austria) Christian Klien			Ret	6													**8**
	(Italy) Roberto Papini											Ret	6					**8**
26	(Italy) Alessandro Battaglin	DNS	DNS	Ret	DNS					10	9			11	14			**8**
27	(Italy) Leonardo Baccarelli	10	11			Ret	12							14	13	12	DNS	**8**
28	(Italy) Ferdinando Geri	15	13	10	Ret	Ret	13											**7**
29	(Italy) Jonathan Giacon									9	Ret							**4**
30	(Colombia) Camilo Zurcher													10	10			**4**
31	(Italy) Diego Romanini											9	DNS					**3**
32	(Italy) Mario Buscemi															11	10	**3**
33	(Italy) Nicola Larini							10	Ret	DNS	DNS							**3**
34	(Italy) Massimiliano Fantini	DNS	Ret	Ret	DNS	DNS	DNS											**2**
35	(Italy) Marco Fumagalli										11							**1**
36	(Italy) Andrea Perlini									13								**1**
37	(San Marino) Christian Montanari									Ret	DNS							**1**
38	(Italy) Luca Rangoni													DNS	DNS			**0**
	(United Kingdom) John Quartermaine											DNS	DNS					**0**
	(Italy) Roberto Del Castello											DNS	DNS					**0**
	(Italy) Marco Cassarà							DNS	DNS									**0**
	(Sweden) Johan Kristoffersson	DNS	DNS															**0**
Pos	Driver	MNZ (Italy)		BRN (Czech Republic)		SVK (Slovakia)		ZOL (Belgium)		ALG (Portugal)		DON (United Kingdom)		IMO (Italy)		VAL (Italy)		Pts

Colour	Result
Gold	Winner
Silver	Second place
Bronze	Third place
Green	Points classification
Blue	Non-points classification
Blue	Non-classified finish (NC)
Purple	Retired, not classified (Ret)
Red	Did not qualify (DNQ)
Red	Did not pre-qualify (DNPQ)
Black	Disqualified (DSQ)
White	Did not start (DNS)
White	Withdrew (WD)
White	Race cancelled (C)
Blank	Did not practice (DNP)
Blank	Did not arrive (DNA)
Blank	Excluded (EX)

**Bold** – Pole
Italics – Fastest Lap

† – Drivers did not finish the race, but were classified as they completed over 50% of the race distance.

=== Teams' championship ===
Pos	Team	Manufacturer	Points
1	(Italy) Audi Sport Italia	Audi	330
2	(Italy) Mercedes-AMG Romeo Ferraris	Mercedes-Benz	317
3	(Italy) Team BMW Dinamic	BMW	306
4	(Italy) Roma Racing Team	Mercedes-Benz	127
5	(Italy) CAAL Racing	Mercedes-Benz	107
6	(Switzerland) Solaris Motorsport	Chevrolet	93
7	(Italy) Scuderia Giudici	BMW	59
8	(Italy) Petri Corse	Porsche	38
9	(Italy) Adria Racing System	Jaguar, Audi	36
10	(Italy) Todi Corse	BMW	25
11	(Italy) RC Motorsport	Cadillac	16
12	(Italy) RGA Sportmanship	BMW	10
13	(Italy) MRT by Nocentini	Lexus	3
	(Italy) Batt Promotion	Chrysler	3
