= 2012 Superstars Series Spa-Francorchamps round =

(Belgium) 2012 Superstars Series Spa-Francorchamps round
Round details
- Round 6 of 8 rounds in the 2012 Superstars Series
- Layout of the Circuit de Spa-Francorchamps
- Location: Circuit de Spa-Francorchamps, Francorchamps, Belgium
- Course: Permanent racing facility 7.004 km (4.352 mi)

Superstars Series

Race 1
- Date: 15 July 2012
- Laps: 9

Pole position
Driver	(Italy) Gianni Morbidelli	Audi Sport Italia
- Time: 2:32.340

Podium
First	(Italy) Gianni Morbidelli	Audi Sport Italia
Second	(Sweden) Johan Kristoffersson	Audi Sport KMS
Third	(Italy) Vitantonio Liuzzi	CAAL Racing

Fastest lap
Driver	(Sweden) Johan Kristoffersson	Audi Sport KMS
- Time: 2:50.844 (on lap 9)

Race 2
- Date: 15 July 2012
- Laps: 10

Podium
First	(Italy) Gianni Morbidelli	Audi Sport Italia
Second	(Italy) Vitantonio Liuzzi	CAAL Racing
Third	(Finland) Mika Salo	Swiss Team

Fastest lap
Driver	(Italy) Gianni Morbidelli	Audi Sport Italia
- Time: 2:50.106 (on lap 3)

The 2012 Superstars Series Spa-Francorchamps round was the sixth round of the 2012 Superstars Series season. It took place on 15 July at the Circuit de Spa-Francorchamps.

Gianni Morbidelli won both races, driving an Audi RS5.

== Classification ==
=== Qualifying ===
Pos.	No.	Driver	Car	Team	Time	Grid
1	45	(Italy) Gianni Morbidelli	Audi RS5	(Italy) Audi Sport Italia	2:32.340	1
2	46	(Sweden) Johan Kristoffersson	Audi RS5	(Sweden) Audi Sport KMS	2:32.943	2
3	54	(Italy) Vitantonio Liuzzi	Mercedes C63 AMG	(Italy) CAAL Racing	2:34.016	3
4	58	(Italy) Luigi Ferrara	Mercedes C63 AMG	(Italy) CAAL Racing	2:34.305	4
5	1	(Finland) Mika Salo	Maserati Quattroporte	(Switzerland) Swiss Team	2:35.007	5
6	30	(Colombia) Camilo Zurcher	Mercedes C63 AMG	(Italy) Romeo Ferraris	2:35.065	6
7	3	(Italy) Thomas Biagi	BMW M3 E92	(Italy) Dinamic Motorsport	2:35.112	7
8	6	(Italy) Stefano Gabellini	BMW M3 E92	(Italy) Dinamic Motorsport	2:35.324	8
9	99	(Italy) Andrea Larini	Mercedes C63 AMG	(Italy) Romeo Ferraris	2:35.440	9
10	47	(Germany) Thomas Schöffler	Audi RS5	(Germany) MTM Motorsport	2:35.531	10
11	9	(San Marino) Paolo Meloni	BMW M3 E90	(San Marino) W&D Racing Team	2:35.673	11
12	12	(Italy) Francesco Sini	Chevrolet Lumina CR8	(Italy) Solaris Motorsport	2:35.952	12
13	19	(Italy) Domenico Ferlito	Jaguar XFR	(Italy) Ferlito Motors	2:36.158	13
14	4	(United Kingdom) Jeff Smith	BMW M3 E92	(Italy) Dinamic Motorsport	2:39.714	14
15	2	(Italy) Mauro Cesari	Maserati Quattroporte	(Switzerland) Swiss Team	2:41.050	15
16	27	(Italy) Domenico Caldarola	Mercedes C63 AMG	(Italy) Roma Racing Team	2:42.992	16
17	28	(Italy) Alessandro Garofano (Italy) Luca Rangoni	Mercedes C63 AMG	(Italy) Roma Racing Team	2:44.349	19^{1}
18	10	(San Marino) Walter Meloni	BMW M3 E90	(San Marino) W&D Racing Team	2:51.945	17
19	18	(Italy) Massimo Pigoli	Jaguar XFR	(Italy) Ferlito Motors	2:53.302	18

Notes:

- ^1 – Alessandro Garofano and Luca Rangoni were moved to the back of the grid because only Rangoni drove in the session, whereas both drivers would have to drive in.

=== Race 1 ===
Pos.	No.	Driver	Car	Team	Laps	Time/Retired	Grid	Points
1	45	(Italy) Gianni Morbidelli	Audi RS5	(Italy) Audi Sport Italia	9	28:12.795	1	21+1
2	46	(Sweden) Johan Kristoffersson	Audi RS5	(Sweden) Audi Sport KMS	9	+1.269	2	16+1
3	54	(Italy) Vitantonio Liuzzi	Mercedes C63 AMG	(Italy) CAAL Racing	9	+13.938	3	13
4	58	(Italy) Luigi Ferrara	Mercedes C63 AMG	(Italy) CAAL Racing	9	+15.725	4	11
5	1	(Finland) Mika Salo	Maserati Quattroporte	(Switzerland) Swiss Team	9	+17.248	5	9
6	30	(Colombia) Camilo Zurcher	Mercedes C63 AMG	(Italy) Romeo Ferraris	9	+23.843	6	7
7	47	(Germany) Thomas Schöffler	Audi RS5	(Germany) MTM Motorsport	9	+26.241	10	5
8	99	(Italy) Andrea Larini	Mercedes C63 AMG	(Italy) Romeo Ferraris	9	+36.874	9	4
9	6	(Italy) Stefano Gabellini	BMW M3 E92	(Italy) Dinamic Motorsport	9	+39.064	8	3
10	3	(Italy) Thomas Biagi	BMW M3 E92	(Italy) Dinamic Motorsport	9	+44.571	7	2
11	12	(Italy) Francesco Sini	Chevrolet Lumina CR8	(Italy) Solaris Motorsport	9	+59.828	12	1
12	28	(Italy) Luca Rangoni	Mercedes C63 AMG	(Italy) Roma Racing Team	9	+1:00.525	19	1
13	4	(United Kingdom) Jeff Smith	BMW M3 E92	(Italy) Dinamic Motorsport	9	+1:14.378	14	1
14	27	(Italy) Domenico Caldarola	Mercedes C63 AMG	(Italy) Roma Racing Team	9	+1:17.121	16	1
15	19	(Italy) Domenico Ferlito	Jaguar XFR	(Italy) Ferlito Motors	9	+1:34.314	13	1
16	9	(San Marino) Paolo Meloni	BMW M3 E90	(San Marino) W&D Racing Team	9	+1:42.575	11	1
17	2	(Italy) Mauro Cesari	Maserati Quattroporte	(Switzerland) Swiss Team	9	+2:03.695	15	1
18	10	(San Marino) Walter Meloni	BMW M3 E90	(San Marino) W&D Racing Team	9	+2:31.548	17	1
19	18	(Italy) Massimo Pigoli	Jaguar XFR	(Italy) Ferlito Motors	5	Retired	18	1

=== Race 2 ===
Pos.	No.	Driver	Car	Team	Laps	Time/Retired	Grid	Points
1	45	(Italy) Gianni Morbidelli	Audi RS5	(Italy) Audi Sport Italia	10	28:42.438	8	21+1
2	54	(Italy) Vitantonio Liuzzi	Mercedes C63 AMG	(Italy) CAAL Racing	10	+11.991	6	16
3	1	(Finland) Mika Salo	Maserati Quattroporte	(Switzerland) Swiss Team	10	+13.537	4	13
4	3	(Italy) Thomas Biagi	BMW M3 E92	(Italy) Dinamic Motorsport	10	+25.917	10	11
5	6	(Italy) Stefano Gabellini	BMW M3 E92	(Italy) Dinamic Motorsport	10	+29.255	9	9
6	47	(Germany) Thomas Schöffler	Audi RS5	(Germany) MTM Motorsport	10	+31.638	2	7
7	4	(United Kingdom) Jeff Smith	BMW M3 E92	(Italy) Dinamic Motorsport	10	+42.490	13	5
8	27	(Italy) Domenico Caldarola	Mercedes C63 AMG	(Italy) Roma Racing Team	10	+46.787	14	4
9	18	(Italy) Massimo Pigoli	Jaguar XFR	(Italy) Ferlito Motors	10	+49.007	19	3
10	19	(Italy) Domenico Ferlito	Jaguar XFR	(Italy) Ferlito Motors	10	+51.412	15	2
11	58	(Italy) Luigi Ferrara	Mercedes C63 AMG	(Italy) CAAL Racing	10	+53.470^{2}	5	1
12	28	(Italy) Alessandro Garofano	Mercedes C63 AMG	(San Marino) Roma Racing Team	10	+1:02.380	12	1
13	10	(San Marino) Walter Meloni	BMW M3 E90	(San Marino) W&D Racing Team	10	+1:54.190	18	1
14	99	(Italy) Andrea Larini	Mercedes C63 AMG	(Italy) Romeo Ferraris	8	Retired	1	1
15	9	(San Marino) Paolo Meloni	BMW M3 E90	(San Marino) W&D Racing Team	8	Retired	16	1
Ret	2	(Italy) Mauro Cesari	Maserati Quattroporte	(Switzerland) Swiss Team	4	Retired	17	1
Ret	46	(Sweden) Johan Kristoffersson	Audi RS5	(Sweden) Audi Sport KMS	2	Retired	7	1
Ret	30	(Colombia) Camilo Zurcher	Mercedes C63 AMG	(Italy) Romeo Ferraris	0	Retired	3	1
Ret	12	(Italy) Francesco Sini	Chevrolet Lumina CR8	(Italy) Solaris Motorsport	0	Retired	11	1

Notes:

- ^2 – Luigi Ferrara was given a 25-second penalty for exceeding track limits and gaining an advantage on Stefano Gabellini.

== Standings after the event ==
International Series standings

	Pos	Driver	Points
	1	(Italy) Vitantonio Liuzzi	149
1	2	(Sweden) Johan Kristoffersson	130
1	3	(Italy) Thomas Biagi	127
2	4	(Italy) Gianni Morbidelli	110
1	5	(Italy) Andrea Larini	83

Teams' Championship standings

	Pos	Driver	Points
	1	(Italy) Dinamic Motorsport	206
	2	(Italy) CAAL Racing	173
	3	(Switzerland) Swiss Team	140
	4	(Sweden) Audi Sport KMS	130
3	5	(Italy) Audi Sport Italia	110

- Note: Only the top five positions are included for both sets of drivers' standings.
