= 2012 Superstars Series Pergusa round =

(Italy) 2012 Superstars Series Pergusa round
Round details
- Round 8 of 8 rounds in the 2012 Superstars Series
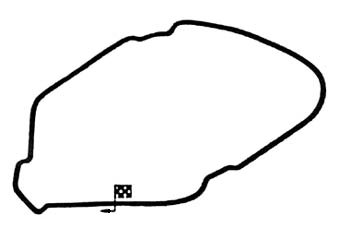
- Layout of the Autodromo di Pergusa
- Location: Autodromo di Pergusa, Pergusa, Italy
- Course: Permanent racing facility 4.950 km (3.076 mi)

Superstars Series

Race 1
- Date: 28 October 2012
- Laps: 14

Pole position
Driver	(Italy) Raffaele Giammaria	Romeo Ferraris
- Time: 1:42.589

Podium
First	(Italy) Raffaele Giammaria	Romeo Ferraris
Second	(Italy) Francesco Sini	Solaris Motorsport
Third	(Italy) Vitantonio Liuzzi	CAAL Racing

Fastest lap
Driver	(Italy) Raffaele Giammaria	Romeo Ferraris
- Time: 1:44.974 (on lap 12)

Race 2
- Date: 28 October 2012
- Laps: 13

Podium
First	(Italy) Raffaele Giammaria	Romeo Ferraris
Second	(Italy) Luigi Ferrara	Roma Racing Team
Third	(Italy) Thomas Biagi	Dinamic Motorsport

Fastest lap
Driver	(Italy) Raffaele Giammaria	Romeo Ferraris
- Time: 1:45.076 (on lap 10)

The 2012 Superstars Series Pergusa round was the eighth and final round of the 2012 Superstars Series season. It took place on 28 October at the Autodromo di Pergusa.

Raffaele Giammaria won both races, driving a Mercedes C63 AMG.

== Classification ==
=== Qualifying ===
Pos.	No.	Driver	Car	Team	Time	Grid
1	30	(Italy) Raffaele Giammaria	Mercedes C63 AMG	(Italy) Romeo Ferraris	1:42.589	1
2	18	(Italy) Massimo Pigoli	Jaguar XFR	(Italy) Ferlito Motors	1:43.158	2
3	11	(Italy) Simone Iacone	Chevrolet Lumina CR8	(Italy) Solaris Motorsport	1:43.562	3
4	99	(Italy) Andrea Larini	Mercedes C63 AMG	(Italy) Romeo Ferraris	1:43.649^{1}	4
5	3	(Italy) Thomas Biagi	BMW M3 E92	(Italy) Dinamic Motorsport	1:43.915	5
6	12	(Italy) Francesco Sini	Chevrolet Lumina CR8	(Italy) Solaris Motorsport	1:43.925	6
7	54	(Italy) Vitantonio Liuzzi	Mercedes C63 AMG	(Italy) CAAL Racing	1:44.356	7
8	4	(Italy) Massimiliano Mugelli	BMW M3 E92	(Italy) Dinamic Motorsport	1:44.564	8
9	58	(Italy) Andrea Bacci	Mercedes C63 AMG	(Italy) CAAL Racing	1:45.498	9
10	19	(Italy) Ezio Muccio	Jaguar XFR	(Italy) Ferlito Motors	1:45.770	10
11	6	(Italy) Giovanni Berton	BMW M3 E92	(Italy) Dinamic Motorsport	1:45.842	11
12	27	(Italy) Domenico Caldarola	Mercedes C63 AMG Coupé	(Italy) Roma Racing Team	1:45.845	12
13	1	(Brazil) Christian Fittipaldi	Maserati Quattroporte	(Switzerland) Swiss Team	1:46.921^{1}	13
14	46	(Sweden) Johan Kristoffersson	Audi RS5	(Sweden) Audi Sport KMS	1:47.118	14
15	2	(Italy) Mauro Cesari	Maserati Quattroporte	(Switzerland) Swiss Team	1:47.921	15
16	28	(Italy) Luigi Ferrara	Mercedes C63 AMG	(Italy) Roma Racing Team	no time	16
17	45	(Italy) Gianni Morbidelli	Audi RS5	(Italy) Audi Sport Italia	no time	17
18	47	(Germany) Thomas Schöffler	Audi RS5	(Germany) MTM Motorsport	no time	18
19	56	(Italy) Marco Pollara	BMW 550i E60	(Italy) Todi Corse	no time	19

Notes:

- ^1 – Andrea Larini and Christian Fittipaldi's best times were deleted for exceeding track limits.

=== Race 1 ===
Pos.	No.	Driver	Car	Team	Laps	Time/Retired	Grid	Points
1	30	(Italy) Raffaele Giammaria	Mercedes C63 AMG	(Italy) Romeo Ferraris	14	27:38.005	1	21+2
2	12	(Italy) Francesco Sini	Chevrolet Lumina CR8	(Italy) Solaris Motorsport	14	+5.988	6	16
3	54	(Italy) Vitantonio Liuzzi	Mercedes C63 AMG	(Italy) CAAL Racing	14	+46.581	7	13
4	58	(Italy) Andrea Bacci	Mercedes C63 AMG	(Italy) CAAL Racing	14	+48.814	9	11
5	46	(Sweden) Johan Kristoffersson	Audi RS5	(Sweden) Audi Sport KMS	14	+1:18.093	14	9
6	45	(Italy) Gianni Morbidelli	Audi RS5	(Italy) Audi Sport Italia	14	+1:18.762	17	7
7	28	(Italy) Luigi Ferrara	Mercedes C63 AMG	(Italy) Roma Racing Team	14	+1:19.442	16	5
8	2	(Italy) Mauro Cesari	Maserati Quattroporte	(Switzerland) Swiss Team	14	+1:24.827	15	4
9	47	(Germany) Thomas Schöffler	Audi RS5	(Germany) MTM Motorsport	14	+1:28.840	18	3
10	27	(Italy) Domenico Caldarola	Mercedes C63 AMG Coupé	(Italy) Roma Racing Team	12	Retired	12	2
11	18	(Italy) Massimo Pigoli	Jaguar XFR	(Italy) Ferlito Motors	9	Retired	2	1
12	6	(Italy) Giovanni Berton	BMW M3 E92	(Italy) Dinamic Motorsport	7	Retired	11	1
13	4	(Italy) Massimiliano Mugelli	BMW M3 E92	(Italy) Dinamic Motorsport	7	Retired	8	1
14	56	(Italy) Marco Pollara	BMW 550i E60	(Italy) Todi Corse	7	Retired	19	1
Ret	3	(Italy) Thomas Biagi	BMW M3 E92	(Italy) Dinamic Motorsport	6	Retired	5	1
Ret	1	(Brazil) Christian Fittipaldi	Maserati Quattroporte	(Switzerland) Swiss Team	5	Retired	13	1
Ret	19	(Italy) Ezio Muccio	Jaguar XFR	(Italy) Ferlito Motors	1	Retired	10	1
Ret	11	(Italy) Simone Iacone	Chevrolet Lumina CR8	(Italy) Solaris Motorsport	0	Retired	3	1
Ret	99	(Italy) Andrea Larini	Mercedes C63 AMG	(Italy) Romeo Ferraris	0	Retired	4	1

=== Race 2 ===
Pos.	No.	Driver	Car	Team	Laps	Time/Retired	Grid	Points
1	30	(Italy) Raffaele Giammaria	Mercedes C63 AMG	(Italy) Romeo Ferraris	13	27:33.024	8	21+1
2	28	(Italy) Luigi Ferrara	Mercedes C63 AMG	(Italy) Roma Racing Team	13	+11.213	2	16
3	3	(Italy) Thomas Biagi	BMW M3 E92	(Italy) Dinamic Motorsport	13	+14.430	15	13
4	11	(Italy) Simone Iacone	Chevrolet Lumina CR8	(Italy) Solaris Motorsport	13	+15.079^{2}	18	11
5	1	(Brazil) Christian Fittipaldi	Maserati Quattroporte	(Switzerland) Swiss Team	13	+35.806	16	9
6	2	(Italy) Mauro Cesari	Maserati Quattroporte	(Switzerland) Swiss Team	13	+38.312	1	7
7	4	(Italy) Massimiliano Mugelli	BMW M3 E92	(Italy) Dinamic Motorsport	13	+40.970^{3}	13	5
8	19	(Italy) Ezio Muccio	Jaguar XFR	(Italy) Ferlito Motors	12	+1 lap	17	4
9	54	(Italy) Vitantonio Liuzzi	Mercedes C63 AMG	(Italy) CAAL Racing	10	Retired	6	3
Ret	45	(Italy) Gianni Morbidelli	Audi RS5	(Italy) Audi Sport Italia	4	Retired	3	1
Ret	58	(Italy) Andrea Bacci	Mercedes C63 AMG	(Italy) CAAL Racing	3	Retired	5	1
Ret	47	(Germany) Thomas Schöffler	Audi RS5	(Germany) MTM Motorsport	3	Retired	9	1
Ret	12	(Italy) Francesco Sini	Chevrolet Lumina CR8	(Italy) Solaris Motorsport	3	Retired	7	1
Ret	46	(Sweden) Johan Kristoffersson	Audi RS5	(Sweden) Audi Sport KMS	0	Retired	4	1
Ret	27	(Italy) Domenico Caldarola	Mercedes C63 AMG Coupé	(Italy) Roma Racing Team	0	Retired	10	1
Ret	6	(Italy) Giovanni Berton	BMW M3 E92	(Italy) Dinamic Motorsport	0	Retired	12	1
Ret	56	(Italy) Marco Pollara	BMW 550i E60	(Italy) Todi Corse	0	Retired	14	1
DSQ	99	(Italy) Andrea Larini	Mercedes C63 AMG	(Italy) Romeo Ferraris	9	Retired^{4}	19	1
DNS	18	(Italy) Massimo Pigoli	Jaguar XFR	(Italy) Ferlito Motors		Did not start	11	

Notes:

- ^2 – Simone Iacone was given a 3-second penalty for causing a collision with Thomas Biagi.
- ^3 – Massimiliano Mugelli was given a 3-second penalty for causing a collision with Mauro Cesari.
- ^4 – Andrea Larini was disqualified for causing a collision with Vitantonio Liuzzi.

== Standings after the event ==
International Series standings

	Pos	Driver	Points
	1	(Sweden) Johan Kristoffersson	185
	2	(Italy) Vitantonio Liuzzi	181
	3	(Italy) Thomas Biagi	161
	4	(Italy) Gianni Morbidelli	128
1	5	(Italy) Francesco Sini	92

Italian Championship standings

	Pos	Driver	Points
	1	(Sweden) Johan Kristoffersson	124
	2	(Italy) Thomas Biagi	100
	3	(Italy) Vitantonio Liuzzi	92
1	4	(Italy) Francesco Sini	72
1	5	(Italy) Andrea Larini	71

Teams' Championship standings

Pos	Driver	Points
1	(Italy) Dinamic Motorsport	275
2	(Italy) CAAL Racing	222
3	(Sweden) Audi Sport KMS	185
4	(Switzerland) Swiss Team	169
5	(Italy) Romeo Ferraris	168

- Note: Only the top five positions are included for both sets of drivers' standings.
