= 2012 Superstars Series Mugello round =

(Italy) 2012 Superstars Series Mugello round
Round details
- Round 4 of 8 rounds in the 2012 Superstars Series
- Layout of the Mugello Circuit
- Location: Mugello Circuit, Scarperia, Italy
- Course: Permanent racing facility 5.245 km (3.259 mi)

Superstars Series

Race 1
- Date: 3 June 2012
- Laps: 11

Pole position
Driver	(Italy) Thomas Biagi	Dinamic Motorsport
- Time: 1:57.450

Podium
First	(Italy) Andrea Larini	Romeo Ferraris
Second	(United Kingdom) Johnny Herbert	Swiss Team
Third	(Italy) Stefano Gabellini	Dinamic Motorsport

Fastest lap
Driver	(United Kingdom) Johnny Herbert	Swiss Team
- Time: 1:58.290

Race 2
- Date: 3 June 2012
- Laps: 14

Podium
First	(Italy) Francesco Sini	Solaris Motorsport
Second	(Italy) Stefano Gabellini	Dinamic Motorsport
Third	(Italy) Thomas Biagi	Dinamic Motorsport

Fastest lap
Driver	(Italy) Stefano Gabellini	Dinamic Motorsport
- Time: 1:58.644 (on lap 9)

The 2012 Superstars Series Mugello round was the fourth round of the 2012 Superstars Series season. It took place on 3 June at the Mugello Circuit.

Andrea Larini won the first race, starting from sixth position, driving a Mercedes C63 AMG, and Francesco Sini gained the second one, driving a Chevrolet Lumina CR8.

== Classification ==
=== Qualifying ===
Pos.	No.	Driver	Car	Team	Time	Grid
1	3	(Italy) Thomas Biagi	BMW M3 E92	(Italy) Dinamic Motorsport	1:57.490	1
2	4	(Italy) Sandro Bettini	BMW M3 E92	(Italy) Dinamic Motorsport	1:57.492	2
3	30	(Colombia) Camilo Zurcher	Mercedes C63 AMG	(Italy) Romeo Ferraris	1:57.609	3
4	1	(United Kingdom) Johnny Herbert	Maserati Quattroporte	(Switzerland) Swiss Team	1:57.678	4
5	45	(Italy) Gianni Morbidelli	Audi RS5	(Italy) Audi Sport Italia	1:57.735	5
6	99	(Italy) Andrea Larini	Mercedes C63 AMG	(Italy) Romeo Ferraris	1:57.788	6
7	46	(Sweden) Johan Kristoffersson	Audi RS5	(Sweden) Audi Sport KMS	1:57.881	7
8	6	(Italy) Stefano Gabellini	BMW M3 E92	(Italy) Dinamic Motorsport	1:57.971	8
9	9	(San Marino) Paolo Meloni	BMW M3 E90	(San Marino) W&D Racing Team	1:58.082	9
10	54	(Italy) Vitantonio Liuzzi	Mercedes C63 AMG	(Italy) CAAL Racing	1:58.403	10
11	18	(Italy) Massimo Pigoli	Jaguar XFR	(Italy) Ferlito Motors	1:58.403	11
12	58	(Italy) Massimiliano Mugelli	Mercedes C63 AMG	(Italy) CAAL Racing	1:58.822	12
13	28	(Indonesia) Ananda Mikola	Mercedes C63 AMG	(Italy) Roma Racing Team	1:58.951	13
14	12	(Italy) Francesco Sini	Chevrolet Lumina CR8	(Italy) Solaris Motorsport	1:58.969	14
15	47	(Germany) Thomas Schöffler	Audi RS5	(Germany) MTM Motorsport	1:59.377	15
16	27	(Italy) Domenico Caldarola	Mercedes C63 AMG	(Italy) Roma Racing Team	1:59.433	16
17	2	(Italy) Mauro Cesari	Maserati Quattroporte	(Switzerland) Swiss Team	1:59.595	17
18	19	(Italy) Andrea Boffo	Jaguar XFR	(Italy) Ferlito Motors	1:59.926	18
19	10	(San Marino) Walter Meloni	BMW M3 E90	(San Marino) W&D Racing Team	2:00.073	19
20	33	(Italy) Gianni Giudici	BMW M3 E92	(Italy) Scuderia Giudici	2:00.494	20
21	8	(Italy) Francesco Ascani	BMW M3 E90	(Italy) Todi Corse	2:00.767	21
22	56	(Italy) Leonardo Baccarelli	BMW 550i E60	(Italy) Todi Corse	2:02.145	22
23	43	(Italy) Marco Fumagalli (Italy) Andrea Perlini	BMW M3 E92	(Italy) Scuderia Giudici	2:02.713	23

=== Race 1 ===
Pos.	No.	Driver	Car	Team	Laps	Time/Retired	Grid	Points
1	99	(Italy) Andrea Larini	Mercedes C63 AMG	(Italy) Romeo Ferraris	11	28:40.453	6	21
2	1	(United Kingdom) Johnny Herbert	Maserati Quattroporte	(Switzerland) Swiss Team	11	+0.421	4	16+1
3	6	(Italy) Stefano Gabellini	BMW M3 E92	(Italy) Dinamic Motorsport	11	+7.138	8	13
4	46	(Sweden) Johan Kristoffersson	Audi RS5	(Sweden) Audi Sport KMS	11	+7.932	7	11
5	54	(Italy) Vitantonio Liuzzi	Mercedes C63 AMG	(Italy) CAAL Racing	11	+12.268	10	9
6	18	(Italy) Massimo Pigoli	Jaguar XFR	(Italy) Ferlito Motors	11	+14.227	11	7
7	12	(Italy) Francesco Sini	Chevrolet Lumina CR8	(Italy) Solaris Motorsport	11	+14.588	14	5
8	28	(Indonesia) Ananda Mikola	Mercedes C63 AMG	(Italy) Roma Racing Team	11	+15.893	13	4
9	9	(San Marino) Paolo Meloni	BMW M3 E90	(San Marino) W&D Racing Team	11	+16.484	9	3
10	2	(Italy) Mauro Cesari	Maserati Quattroporte	(Switzerland) Swiss Team	11	+16.927	17	2
11	47	(Germany) Thomas Schöffler	Audi RS5	(Germany) MTM Motorsport	11	+17.651	15	1
12	8	(Italy) Francesco Ascani	BMW M3 E90	(Italy) Todi Corse	11	+26.750	21	1
13	10	(San Marino) Walter Meloni	BMW M3 E90	(San Marino) W&D Racing Team	11	+28.469	19	1
14	27	(Italy) Domenico Caldarola	Mercedes C63 AMG	(Italy) Roma Racing Team	11	+42.660	16	1
15	43	(Italy) Marco Fumagalli	BMW M3 E92	(Italy) Scuderia Giudici	11	+49.996	23	1
16	58	(Italy) Massimiliano Mugelli	Mercedes C63 AMG	(Italy) CAAL Racing	9	Retired	12	1
Ret	33	(Italy) Gianni Giudici	BMW M3 E92	(Italy) Scuderia Giudici	5	Retired	20	1
Ret	56	(Italy) Leonardo Baccarelli	BMW 550i E60	(Italy) Todi Corse	1	Retired	22	1
Ret	3	(Italy) Thomas Biagi	BMW M3 E92	(Italy) Dinamic Motorsport	0	Retired	1	1+1
Ret	4	(Italy) Sandro Bettini	BMW M3 E92	(Italy) Dinamic Motorsport	0	Retired	2	1
Ret	30	(Colombia) Camilo Zurcher	Mercedes C63 AMG	(Italy) Romeo Ferraris	0	Retired	3	1
Ret	45	(Italy) Gianni Morbidelli	Audi RS5	(Italy) Audi Sport Italia	0	Retired	5	1
Ret	19	(Italy) Andrea Boffo	Jaguar XFR	(Italy) Ferlito Motors	0	Retired	18	1

=== Race 2 ===
Pos.	No.	Driver	Car	Team	Laps	Time/Retired	Grid	Points
1	12	(Italy) Francesco Sini	Chevrolet Lumina CR8	(Italy) Solaris Motorsport	14	28:04.029	2	21
2	6	(Italy) Stefano Gabellini	BMW M3 E92	(Italy) Dinamic Motorsport	14	+0.731	6	16+1
3	3	(Italy) Thomas Biagi	BMW M3 E92	(Italy) Dinamic Motorsport	14	+4.753	19	13
4	28	(Indonesia) Ananda Mikola	Mercedes C63 AMG	(Italy) Roma Racing Team	14	+9.587	1	11
5	54	(Italy) Vitantonio Liuzzi	Mercedes C63 AMG	(Italy) CAAL Racing	14	+10.273	4	9
6	2	(Italy) Mauro Cesari	Maserati Quattroporte	(Switzerland) Swiss Team	14	+10.717	10	7
7	46	(Sweden) Johan Kristoffersson	Audi RS5	(Sweden) Audi Sport KMS	14	+11.427	5	5
8	9	(San Marino) Paolo Meloni	BMW M3 E90	(San Marino) W&D Racing Team	14	+11.599	9	4
9	58	(Italy) Massimiliano Mugelli	Mercedes C63 AMG	(Italy) CAAL Racing	14	+15.069	16	3
10	27	(Italy) Domenico Caldarola	Mercedes C63 AMG	(Italy) Roma Racing Team	14	+35.040	14	2
11	8	(Italy) Francesco Ascani	BMW M3 E90	(Italy) Todi Corse	14	+40.598	12	1
12	10	(San Marino) Walter Meloni	BMW M3 E90	(San Marino) W&D Racing Team	14	+1:07.122	13	1
13	56	(Italy) Leonardo Baccarelli	BMW 550i E60	(Italy) Todi Corse	14	+1:49.194	18	1
14	30	(Colombia) Camilo Zurcher	Mercedes C63 AMG	(Italy) Romeo Ferraris	13	+1 lap	21	1
15	47	(Germany) Thomas Schöffler	Audi RS5	(Germany) MTM Motorsport	11	Retired	11	1
16	19	(Italy) Andrea Boffo	Jaguar XFR	(Italy) Ferlito Motors	11	Retired	23	1
Ret	18	(Italy) Massimo Pigoli	Jaguar XFR	(Italy) Ferlito Motors	5	Retired	3	1
Ret	99	(Italy) Andrea Larini	Mercedes C63 AMG	(Italy) Romeo Ferraris	5	Retired	8	1
Ret	1	(United Kingdom) Johnny Herbert	Maserati Quattroporte	(Switzerland) Swiss Team	5	Retired	7	1
DNS	43	(Italy) Andrea Perlini	BMW M3 E92	(Italy) Scuderia Giudici		Did not start	15	
DNS	33	(Italy) Gianni Giudici	BMW M3 E92	(Italy) Scuderia Giudici		Did not start	17	
DNS	4	(Italy) Sandro Bettini	BMW M3 E92	(Italy) Dinamic Motorsport		Did not start	20	
DNS	45	(Italy) Gianni Morbidelli	Audi RS5	(Italy) Audi Sport Italia		Did not start	22	

== Standings after the event ==
International Series standings

	Pos	Driver	Points
	1	(Sweden) Johan Kristoffersson	101
	2	(Italy) Thomas Biagi	84
	3	(Italy) Vitantonio Liuzzi	82
1	4	(Italy) Andrea Larini	70
2	5	(Italy) Francesco Sini	66

Italian Championship standings

	Pos	Driver	Points
	1	(Sweden) Johan Kristoffersson	69
	2	(Italy) Thomas Biagi	66
	3	(Italy) Andrea Larini	65
	4	(Italy) Vitantonio Liuzzi	60
1	5	(Italy) Francesco Sini	53

Teams' Championship standings

	Pos	Driver	Points
	1	(Italy) Dinamic Motorsport	137
	2	(Sweden) Audi Sport KMS	101
	3	(Italy) CAAL Racing	94
1	4	(Switzerland) Swiss Team	84
2	5	(Italy) Romeo Ferraris	72

- Note: Only the top five positions are included for both sets of drivers' standings.
