= Andrea Bacci =

Italian racing driver (born 1972)

Andrea Bacci is a race car driver born in Florence, Italy on 14 April 1972.

- Not to be confused with Andrea Bacci the Italian actor of From the Clouds to the Resistance.

== Professional career ==
Bacci was in 1993 the Italian Championship Hill Climbing and second in 1994 Italian Championship Touring Car. Championship winner and the 1995 and 1999 Italian CIVT Series champion. He was the 2000 Italian Superproduction Championship, in 2001 and 2004, second in Italian Championship Superproduction. He was in 2005 and 2010 the Italian Champhionship Touring Car. In 2006 and 2007, he was the second Italian Championship Touring Car.

In 2012, Bacci was the Italian Championship Touring Car Endurance and in 2016 the Italian Championship Touring Car He also raced in the 1997 Renault Mégane Cup and in one race of the 2001 European Touring Car Championship.
