= Francesco Ascani =

Italian auto racing driver (born 1952)

Francesco Ascani (born 16 April 1952, in Perugia) is an Italian auto racing driver. He was champion in the inaugural season of the Italian Superstars Series in 2004, driving a BMW M5.

Sporting positions
Preceded by none	Superstars Series Champion; 2004	Succeeded by Tobia Masini
