= Stefano Gabellini =

Italian racing driver (born 1965)

- Nationality: (Italy) Italian
- Born: 18 April 1965 (age 61) Pesaro (Italy)

Superstars Series career
- Current team: Team BMW Italia
- Car number: 2

Championship titles
- 2008: International Superstars Series

Stefano Gabellini (born 18 April 1965 in Pesaro) is an Italian racing driver. He has raced in such series as Superstars Series, where he has been a two-time runner-up, and was International Superstars Series champion in 2008.

Sporting positions
Preceded by Giuliano Alessi	International Superstars Series champion 2008	Succeeded by Gianni Morbidelli
