= Max Pigoli =

Italian auto racing driver (born 1958)

Massimo "Max" Pigoli (born 23 February 1958 in Menaggio) is an Italian auto racing driver. He competed in the Italian Superstars Series.

== Career ==
Most of his career was spent in touring car racing. Pigoli was an independent champion in the Italian Superturismo Championship in 1997. Between 2003 and 2005, he competed in the Italian GT Championship with a Porsche GT-3 RS. In 2006, he first competed in the Superstars Series, winning the drivers' title in his debut year in a Jaguar S-Type. His best year since came in 2009, when he finished third in the championship and runner-up in the International Superstars Series. For 2010, Pigoli drove for the Romeo Ferraris team with a Mercedes C63 AMG.

=== Complete Italian Superturismo Championship results ===
Year	Team	Car	1	2	3	4	5	6	7	8	9	10	11	12	13	14	15	16	17	18	19	20	DC	Pts
1993	Greyhound Motorsport	BMW 318i	MNZ; 1; 14	MNZ; 2; 7	VAL; 1	VAL; 2	MIS; 1; 13	MIS; 2; 12	MAG; 1; 10	MAG; 2; 9	BIN; 1; 15	BIN; 2; 10	IMO; 1; 13	IMO; 2 Ret	VAR; 1 Ret	VAR; 2; 19	MIS; 1; 13	MIS; 2; 12	PER; 1	PER; 2	MUG; 1; 8	MUG; 2 Ret	18th	11
1994	Fire Wake Competition	Peugeot 405 Mi 16	MNZ; 1; 11	MNZ; 2; 16	VAL; 1; 13	VAL; 2; 5	MAG; 1; 14	MAG; 2; 14	BIN; 1; 13	BIN; 2; 9	MIS; 1; 19	MIS; 2; 10	VAL; 1; 12	VAL; 2; 13	MUG; 1; 14	MUG; 2 Ret	PER; 1	PER; 2	VAR; 1 Ret	VAR; 2; 8	MUG; 1; 13	MUG; 2; 12	17th	14
1995	Vicenza Motori	Peugeot 405 Mi 16	MIS; 1; 9	MIS; 2; 8	BIN; 1; 14	BIN; 2; 13	MNZ; 1; 13	MNZ; 2 DSQ	IMO; 1; 10	IMO; 2; 11	MAG; 1 DNS	MAG; 2 Ret	MUG; 1; 13	**MUG**; **2**; 12	MIS; 1	MIS; 2	PER; 1	PER; 2	VAR; 1; 6	VAR; 2 Ret	VAL; 1	VAL; 2	16th	12
1996	Tecnica Racing Team Soli Racing Team	Alfa Romeo 155 TS	MUG; 1; 7	MUG; 2 Ret	MAG; 1; 8	MAG; 2; 7	MNZ; 1; 9	MNZ; 2 Ret	BIN; 1; 7	BIN; 2; 8	MIS; 1; 7	MIS; 2 Ret	IMO; 1; 7	IMO; 2	PER; 1	PER; 2	PER; 1; 7	PER; 2	VAR; 1; 7	VAR; 2	VAL; 1; 21	VAL; 2 DNS	9th	36
1997	Christy's Team	BMW 320i	MNZ; 1; 5	MNZ; 2; 5	MUG; 1 Ret	MUG; 2; 13	MAG; 1; 6	MAG; 2; 6	IMO; 1; 7	IMO; 2; 7	IMO; 1; 5	IMO; 2; 8	BIN; 1; 5	BIN; 2; 6	PER; 1; 6	PER; 2; 7	VAR; 1; 9	VAR; 2; 7	MIS; 1 Ret	MIS; 2; 7	VAL; 1; 15	VAL; 2 Ret	8th	81
1998	Christy's Team	Honda Accord	BIN; 1; 12	BIN; 2 Ret	IMO; 1; 11	IMO; 2 DNS	MNZ; 1; 6	MNZ; 2 Ret	VAR; 1; 14	VAR; 2 Ret	VAL; 1	VAL; 2	MAG; 1	MAG; 2	PER; 1	PER; 2	MIS; 1 Ret	MIS; 2 Ret	MNZ; 1; 12	MNZ; 2 Ret	VAL; 1; 10	VAL; 2; 9	17th	11
1999	Christy's Team	BMW 320i	MIS; 1; 9	MIS; 2; 6	BIN; 1; 8	BIN; 2; 6	IMO; 1; 9	IMO; 2 DNS	PER; 1	PER; 2	MAG; 1	MAG; 2	MUG; 1	MUG; 2	MIS; 1	MIS; 2	VAR; 1; 3	VAR; 2; 5	MNZ; 1 Ret	MNZ; 2; 4	VAL; 1; 7	VAL; 2; 6	8th	95

=== Complete European Touring Car Championship results ===
(key) (Races in bold indicate pole position) (Races in italics indicate fastest lap)

Year	Team	Car	1	2	3	4	5	6	7	8	9	10	11	12	13	14	15	16	17	18	19	20	DC	Pts
2000	Christy's Team	BMW 320i	MUG; 1; 6	MUG; 2; 8	PER; 1 Ret	PER; 2; 7	A1R; 1; 8	A1R; 2 Ret	MNZ; 1; 11	MNZ; 2; 4	HUN; 1; 9	HUN; 2; 9	IMO; 1; 9	IMO; 2; 6	MIS; 1; 9	MIS; 2; 9	BRN; 1; 8	BRN; 2; 5	VAL; 1; 8	VAL; 2; 9	MOB; 1; 5	MOB; 2; 4	8th	76
2001	AGS Motorsport	Audi A4 Quattro	MNZ; 1; 7	MNZ; 2; 8	BRN; 1; 3	BRN; 2; 8	MAG; 1; 5	MAG; 2; 5	SIL; 1; 10	SIL; 2; 12	ZOL; 1 Ret	ZOL; 2 DNS	HUN; 1 Ret	HUN; 2 Ret	A1R; 1; 11	A1R; 2 Ret	NÜR; 1; 8	NÜR; 2; 11	JAR; 1; 16	JAR; 2 Ret	EST; 1	EST; 2	13th	276

Sporting positions
Preceded by Tobia Masini	Superstars Series; Champion; 2006	Succeeded by Gianni Morbidelli
