= Team Ferlito =

(Italy) Team Ferlito
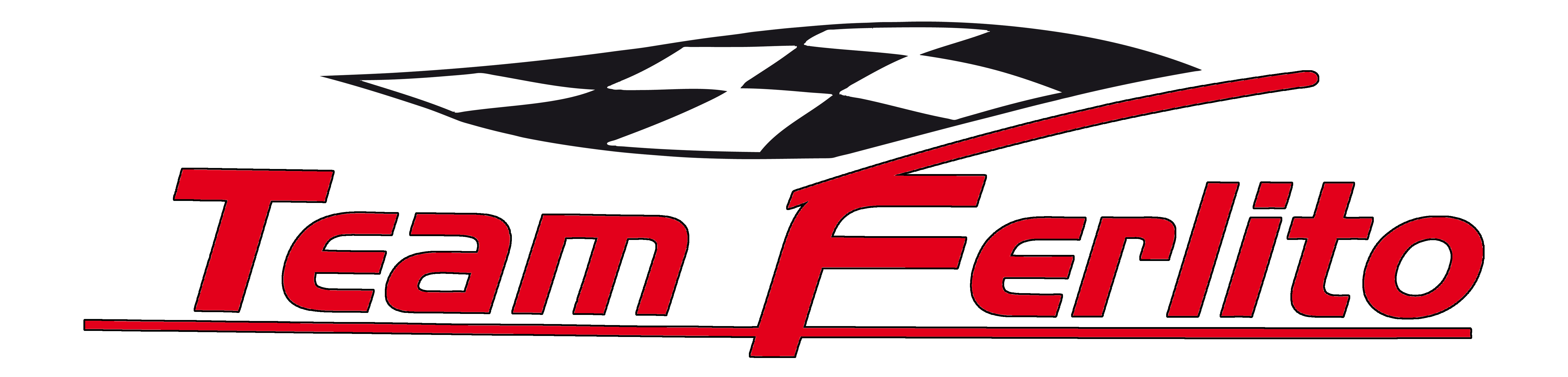
- Founded: 1984
- Team principal(s): Salvatore Ferlito
- Former series: Italian Superturismo Championship; Superstars Series
- Noted drivers: 18. (Italy) Massimo Pigoli; 19. (Italy) Gian Maria Gabbiani; 19. (Indonesia) Ananda Mikola

Team Ferlito is a team founded in 1984 in Verona. It is also known with the name Ferlito Motors, a moniker used until 2010 on the team's racing cars.

The team has participated in numerous editions of European and Italian touring cars championships, and by 2005 is a regular with its Jaguar, in the Superstars Series, a category in which they won the Italian title in 2006.

== Beginning ==
In 1984 Team Ferlito started racing competition in some races in the f. 2000 Championship with a Ralt RT-1 Toyota. The experience was positive, to the extent that the team confirmed their commitment to the series for the next two seasons, where they deployed a more competitive Dallara 384 , which allows them to conquer the third place in the 1985 season.

In parallel with the participation in the f. 2000, in 1987 and 1988 the team also participated in the sportscar Championship, its best result being a victory in the Misano 2 Hours.

== Italian Superturismo Championship ==
In 1989 the team participated for the first time at the Italian Superturismo Championship, where they competed for more than a decade.

Team Ferlito raced in the CIVT with an Alfa Romeo 75. After a string of positive results, in 1991 the team was rewarded as the best private team Alfa Romeo, winning the title in the N3 class with Vincent Faraji and finishing fourth with an Alfa Romeo 164 entrusted directly by the cars manufacturer, with the driver the President of Commissione Sportiva Automobilistica Italiana Fabrizio Serena di Lapigio.

In the same year, former Formula 1 driver Arturo Merzario raced with the team, finishing second in Vallelunga 6 Hours.

The team was also active in the Spanish Touring Car Championship, winning the series in their Alfa Romeo 75 driven by Luis Villamil and Luis Perez-Sala in 1989 and 1991.

In 1993 the competitive and reliable Alfa Romeo 75 was flanked by an Alfa Romeo 164 V6 Turbo and three Alfa Romeo SZ to compete in the CIVT, where they finished second and third overall.

The collaboration with Alfa Romeo continued in 1995 with the new Alfa Romeo 155 2000 16v with Sandro Montani at the wheel. The team finished second in 1995 and won the Championship in 1996.

Over the next few years the team would hire different drivers, including Giuliano Alessi, Fabio Piscopo, Marco Baroncini, Cora De Adamich and Francesco Iorio, who in 2001 won the Challenge Alfa Romeo in an Alfa Romeo 156 TS 16v N3 group.

In 2002 and 2003, in addition to the CIVT, the team also competed in the CSAI Campionato Italiano Superproduzione with two Alfa Romeo 147 SP.

== Superstars Series ==
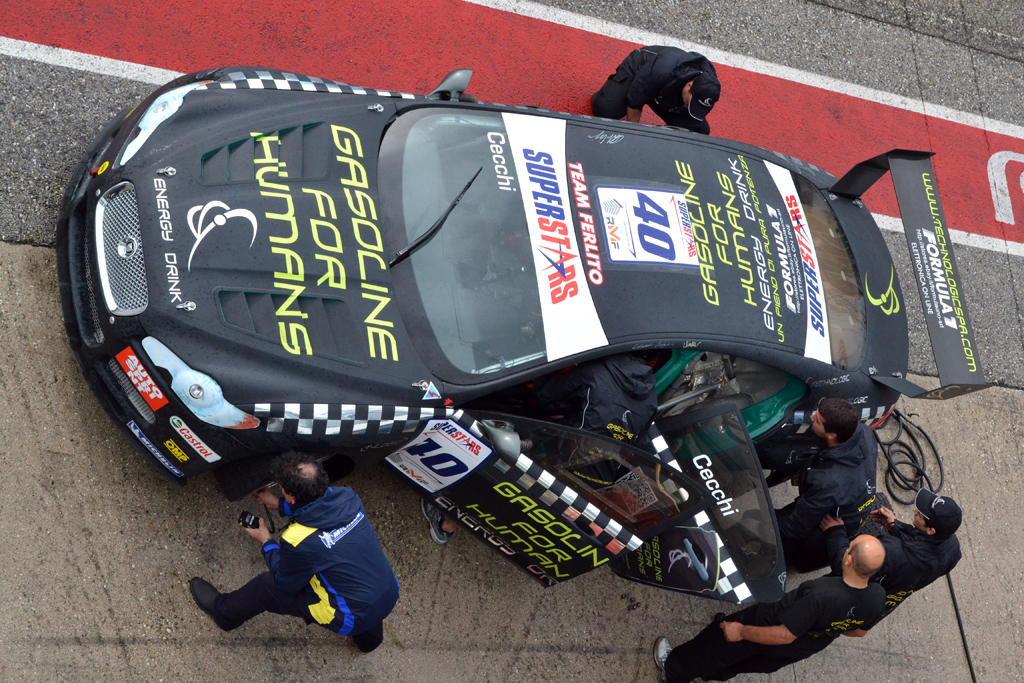
The Jaguar XFR 2011 season

Halfway through the 2005 season, Jaguar gave Team Ferlito two handling Jaguar S-Type R to compete in the Championship Superstars Series, a category reserved for V8-powered sedans. Despite the short time available for the preparation of the cars, the team managed a second place in Varano and a third at Mugello.

In 2006 Max Pigoli won the Italian Superstars Championship in Verona in a S-Type R.

In 2007 the team fielded a second car for Alessandro Balzan.

In 2008 and 2009 the team continued its commitment in the Championship with two Jaguar S-Type R raced by Ermanno Dionysius and different drivers from race to race, including the actor Walter Nudo; at the same time they began the development of the new Jaguar XFR, which made its debut at the last race of the 2009 season in Kyalami.

In 2010 the team fielded two XFR cars for Matteo Cressoni and Marcello Puglisi.

In 2011 the Team decided to drop the usual green livery associated with Jaguar in the Superstars Series to adopt the colours of a new sponsor, the energy drink Gasoline For Humans. The two XFR driven by Luigi Cecchi and Francesco Sini finished sixth at the end of the season.
