= 2011 Superstars Series Monza round =

(Italy) 2011 Superstars Series Monza round
Round details
- Round 1 of 9 rounds in the 2011 Superstars Series
- Layout of the Autodromo Nazionale Monza
- Location: Autodromo Nazionale Monza, Monza, Italy
- Course: Permanent racing facility 5.793 km (3.600 mi)

Superstars Series

Race 1
- Date: 10 April 2011
- Laps: 14

Pole position
Driver	(Italy) Massimo Pigoli	Romeo Ferraris
- Time: 1:55.654

Podium
First	(Italy) Massimo Pigoli	Romeo Ferraris
Second	(Italy) Michela Cerruti	Romeo Ferraris
Third	(Italy) Luigi Ferrara	CAAL Racing

Fastest lap
Driver	(Italy) Luigi Ferrara	CAAL Racing
- Time: 1:55.797 (on lap 4)

Race 2
- Date: 10 April 2011
- Laps: 14

Podium
First	(Italy) Michela Cerruti	Romeo Ferraris
Second	(Italy) Francesco Sini	Ferlito Motors
Third	(Switzerland) Andrea Chiesa	Swiss Team

Fastest lap
Driver	(Italy) Luigi Ferrara	CAAL Racing
- Time: 1:55.170 (on lap 14)

The 2012 Superstars Series Monza round was the first round of the 2011 Superstars Series season. It took place on 10 April at the Autodromo Nazionale Monza.

Massimo Pigoli won the first race, starting from pole position, and Michela Cerruti gained the second one, both driving a Mercedes C63 AMG.

== Classification ==
=== Qualifying ===
Pos.	No.	Driver	Car	Team	Time	Grid
1	18	(Italy) Massimo Pigoli	Mercedes C63 AMG	(Italy) Romeo Ferraris	1:55.654	1
2	46	(Italy) Andrea Bertolini (Switzerland) Andrea Chiesa	Maserati Quattroporte	(Switzerland) Swiss Team	1:55.705	2
3	88	(Italy) Michela Cerruti	Mercedes C63 AMG	(Italy) Romeo Ferraris	1:56.106	3
4	1	(Italy) Thomas Biagi	BMW M3 E92	(Italy) Team BMW Italia	1:57.011	4
5	41	(Italy) Francesco Sini	Jaguar XF SV8	(Italy) Ferlito Motors	1:57.293	5
6	48	(United Kingdom) Johnny Herbert	Mercedes C63 AMG	(Italy) Romeo Ferraris	1:57.379	6
7	2	(Italy) Stefano Gabellini	BMW M3 E92	(Italy) Team BMW Italia	1:57.667	7
8	3	(Italy) Alberto Cerqui	BMW M3 E92	(Italy) Team BMW Italia	1:57.719	8
9	11	(Italy) Andrea Dromedari	Mercedes C63 AMG	(Italy) Romeo Ferraris	1:57.761	9
10	5	(Italy) Fabrizio Armetta	Chevrolet Lumina CR8	(Italy) Motorzone Race Car	1:57.922	10
11	23	(Spain) Sergio Hernández	BMW M3 E92	(Spain) Campos Racing	1:58.182	11
12	27	(Italy) Domenico Caldarola	Mercedes C63 AMG	(Italy) Roma Racing Team	1:58.474	12
13	58	(Italy) Riccardo Romagnoli	Mercedes C63 AMG	(Italy) CAAL Racing	1:58.782	13
14	21	(San Marino) Christian Montanari	BMW M3 E92	(Italy) RGA Sportmanship	1:58.793	14
15	35	(Italy) Roberto Papini	Audi RS4	(Italy) Hop Mobile Audi Sport Italia	1:59.460	15
16	54	(Italy) Luigi Ferrara	Mercedes C63 AMG	(Italy) CAAL Racing	2:00.001	16
17	32	(Spain) Isaac Tutumlu	BMW M3 E92	(Spain) Campos Racing	2:00.318	17
18	99	(Italy) Alex de Giacomi	BMW M3 E90	(Italy) Movisport	2:00.659	18
19	73	(Italy) Sandro Bettini	BMW M3 E90	(Italy) Movisport	2:00.723	19
20	24	(Italy) Roberto Benedetti	Cadillac CTS-V	(Italy) RC Motorsport	2:01.060	20
21	37	(Italy) Riccardo Bossi	Audi RS4	(Italy) Hop Mobile Audi Sport Italia	2:01.580	21
22	40	(Italy) Luigi Cecchi	Jaguar XF SV8	(Italy) Ferlito Motors	2:01.718	22
23	34	(Italy) Ermanno Dionisio	Audi RS4	(Italy) Hop Mobile Audi Sport Italia	2:02.057	23
24	12	(Italy) Francesca Linossi	BMW M3 E92	(Italy) Movisport	2:06.775	24
25	10	(Italy) Alessandro Kouzkin	Chevrolet Lumina CR8	(Italy) Motorzone Race Car	no time	25
26	69	(Italy) Kristian Ghedina	BMW M3 E92	(Italy) RGA Sportmanship	no time	26
27	8	(Italy) Francesco Ascani	BMW M3 E90	(Italy) Movisport	no time	27

=== Race 1 ===
Pos.	No.	Driver	Car	Team	Laps	Time/Retired	Grid	Points
1	18	(Italy) Massimo Pigoli	Mercedes C63 AMG	(Italy) Romeo Ferraris	14	27:18.891	1	20+1
2	88	(Italy) Michela Cerruti	Mercedes C63 AMG	(Italy) Romeo Ferraris	14	+0.064	3	15
3	54	(Italy) Luigi Ferrara	Mercedes C63 AMG	(Italy) CAAL Racing	14	+1.096	16	12+1
4	1	(Italy) Thomas Biagi	BMW M3 E92	(Italy) Team BMW Italia	14	+18.611	4	10
5	3	(Italy) Alberto Cerqui	BMW M3 E92	(Italy) Team BMW Italia	14	+27.505	8	8
6	2	(Italy) Stefano Gabellini	BMW M3 E92	(Italy) Team BMW Italia	14	+31.021	7	6
7	5	(Italy) Fabrizio Armetta	Chevrolet Lumina CR8	(Italy) Motorzone Race Car	14	+32.939	10	4
8	58	(Italy) Riccardo Romagnoli	Mercedes C63 AMG	(Italy) CAAL Racing	14	+38.980	13	3
9	24	(Italy) Roberto Benedetti	Cadillac CTS-V	(Italy) RC Motorsport	14	+54.083	20	2
10	48	(United Kingdom) Johnny Herbert	Mercedes C63 AMG	(Italy) Romeo Ferraris	14	+1:11.649	6	1
11	40	(Italy) Luigi Cecchi	Jaguar XF SV8	(Italy) Ferlito Motors	14	+1:57.102	22	
12	35	(Italy) Roberto Papini	Audi RS4	(Italy) Hop Mobile Audi Sport Italia	13	+1 lap	15	
13	41	(Italy) Francesco Sini	Jaguar XF SV8	(Italy) Ferlito Motors	10	Retired	5	
14	46	(Italy) Andrea Bertolini	Maserati Quattroporte	(Switzerland) Swiss Team	9	Retired	2	
15	10	(Italy) Alessandro Kouzkin	Chevrolet Lumina CR8	(Italy) Motorzone Race Car	9	Retired	25	
16	11	(Italy) Andrea Dromedari	Mercedes C63 AMG	(Italy) Romeo Ferraris	7	Retired	9	
17	99	(Italy) Alex de Giacomi	BMW M3 E90	(Italy) Movisport	7	Retired	18	
Ret	34	(Italy) Ermanno Dionisio	Audi RS4	(Italy) Hop Mobile Audi Sport Italia	6	Retired	23	
Ret	12	(Italy) Francesca Linossi	BMW M3 E92	(Italy) Movisport	5	Retired	24	
Ret	32	(Spain) Isaac Tutumlu	BMW M3 E92	(Spain) Campos Racing	1	Retired	17	
Ret	27	(Italy) Domenico Caldarola	Mercedes C63 AMG	(Italy) Roma Racing Team	1	Retired	12	
Ret	23	(Spain) Sergio Hernández	BMW M3 E92	(Spain) Campos Racing	0	Retired	11	
Ret	73	(Italy) Sandro Bettini	BMW M3 E90	(Italy) Movisport	0	Retired	19	
Ret	37	(Italy) Riccardo Bossi	Audi RS4	(Italy) Hop Mobile Audi Sport Italia	0	Retired	21	
DNS	21	(San Marino) Christian Montanari	BMW M3 E92	(Italy) RGA Sportmanship		Did not start	14	
DNS	69	(Italy) Kristian Ghedina	BMW M3 E92	(Italy) RGA Sportmanship		Did not start	26	
DNS	8	(Italy) Francesco Ascani	BMW M3 E90	(Italy) Movisport		Did not start	27	

=== Race 2 ===
Pos.	No.	Driver	Car	Team	Laps	Time/Retired	Grid	Points
1	88	(Italy) Michela Cerruti	Mercedes C63 AMG	(Italy) Romeo Ferraris	14	27:49.021	3	20
2	41	(Italy) Francesco Sini	Jaguar XF SV8	(Italy) Ferlito Motors	14	+6.902	5	15
3	46	(Switzerland) Andrea Chiesa	Maserati Quattroporte	(Switzerland) Swiss Team	14	+7.132	2	12
4	58	(Italy) Riccardo Romagnoli	Mercedes C63 AMG	(Italy) CAAL Racing	14	+8.053	13	10
5	3	(Italy) Alberto Cerqui	BMW M3 E92	(Italy) Team BMW Italia	14	+12.625	8	8
6	2	(Italy) Stefano Gabellini	BMW M3 E92	(Italy) Team BMW Italia	14	+13.156	7	6
7	73	(Italy) Sandro Bettini	BMW M3 E90	(Italy) Movisport	14	+35.406	19	4
8	1	(Italy) Thomas Biagi	BMW M3 E92	(Italy) Team BMW Italia	14	+38.359	4	3
9	24	(Italy) Roberto Benedetti	Cadillac CTS-V	(Italy) RC Motorsport	14	+1:18.033	20	2
10	54	(Italy) Luigi Ferrara	Mercedes C63 AMG	(Italy) CAAL Racing	14	+1:21.099	16	1+1
11	18	(Italy) Massimo Pigoli	Mercedes C63 AMG	(Italy) Romeo Ferraris	14	+1:53.580	1	
12	5	(Italy) Fabrizio Armetta	Chevrolet Lumina CR8	(Italy) Motorzone Race Car	8	Retired	10	
13	11	(Italy) Andrea Dromedari	Mercedes C63 AMG	(Italy) Romeo Ferraris	8	Retired	9	
14	27	(Italy) Domenico Caldarola	Mercedes C63 AMG	(Italy) Roma Racing Team	7	Retired	12	
Ret	10	(Italy) Alessandro Kouzkin	Chevrolet Lumina CR8	(Italy) Motorzone Race Car	5	Retired	25	
Ret	35	(Italy) Roberto Papini	Audi RS4	(Italy) Hop Mobile Audi Sport Italia	3	Retired	15	
Ret	32	(Spain) Isaac Tutumlu	BMW M3 E92	(Spain) Campos Racing	3	Retired	17	
Ret	12	(Italy) Francesca Linossi	BMW M3 E92	(Italy) Movisport	3	Retired	24	
Ret	99	(Italy) Alex de Giacomi	BMW M3 E90	(Italy) Movisport	2	Retired	18	
Ret	37	(Italy) Riccardo Bossi	Audi RS4	(Italy) Hop Mobile Audi Sport Italia	1	Retired	21	
Ret	48	(United Kingdom) Johnny Herbert	Mercedes C63 AMG	(Italy) Romeo Ferraris	0	Retired	6	
Ret	23	(Spain) Sergio Hernández	BMW M3 E92	(Spain) Campos Racing	0	Retired	11	
Ret	40	(Italy) Luigi Cecchi	Jaguar XF SV8	(Italy) Ferlito Motors	0	Retired	22	
Ret	34	(Italy) Ermanno Dionisio	Audi RS4	(Italy) Hop Mobile Audi Sport Italia	0	Retired	23	
DNS	21	(San Marino) Christian Montanari	BMW M3 E92	(Italy) RGA Sportmanship		Did not start	14	
DNS	69	(Italy) Kristian Ghedina	BMW M3 E92	(Italy) RGA Sportmanship		Did not start	26	
DNS	8	(Italy) Francesco Ascani	BMW M3 E90	(Italy) Movisport		Did not start	27	

== Standings after the event ==
International Series and Italian Championship standings

Pos	Driver	Points
1	(Italy) Michela Cerruti	35
2	(Italy) Massimo Pigoli	21
3	(Italy) Alberto Cerqui	16
4	(Italy) Francesco Sini	15
5	(Italy) Luigi Ferrara	15

Teams' Championship standings

Pos	Driver	Points
1	(Italy) Romeo Ferraris	56
2	(Italy) Team BMW Italia	32
3	(Italy) CAAL Racing	27
4	(Italy) Ferlito Motors	15
5	(Switzerland) Swiss Team	12

- Note: Only the top five positions are included for both sets of drivers' standings.
