= 2011 Superstars Series Valencia round =

(Spain) 2011 Superstars Series Valencia round
Round details
- Round 2 of 9 rounds in the 2011 Superstars Series
- Layout of the Circuit Ricardo Tormo
- Location: Circuit Ricardo Tormo, Cheste, Spain
- Course: Permanent racing facility 4.005 km (2.517 mi)

Superstars Series

Race 1
- Date: 8 May 2011
- Laps: 16

Pole position
Driver	(Italy) Andrea Bertolini	Swiss Team
- Time: 1:56.022

Podium
First	(Italy) Andrea Bertolini	Swiss Team
Second	(Italy) Luigi Ferrara	CAAL Racing
Third	(Italy) Thomas Biagi	Team BMW Italia

Fastest lap
Driver	(Italy) Andrea Bertolini	Swiss Team
- Time: 1:41.164

Race 2
- Date: 8 May 2011
- Laps: 16

Podium
First	(Italy) Luigi Ferrara	CAAL Racing
Second	(Italy) Andrea Bertolini	Swiss Team
Third	(Italy) Massimo Pigoli	Romeo Ferraris

Fastest lap
Driver	(Italy) Luigi Ferrara	CAAL Racing
- Time: 1:41.460

The 2012 Superstars Series Valencia round was the second round of the 2011 Superstars Series season. It took place on 8 May at the Circuit Ricardo Tormo.

Andrea Bertolini won the first race, starting from pole position, driving a Maserati Quattroporte and Luigi Ferrara gained the second one, driving a Mercedes C63 AMG.

== Classification ==
=== Qualifying ===
Pos.	No.	Driver	Car	Team	Time	Grid
1	33	(Italy) Andrea Bertolini	Maserati Quattroporte	(Switzerland) Swiss Team	1:56.022	1
2	54	(Italy) Luigi Ferrara	Mercedes C63 AMG	(Italy) CAAL Racing	1:56.963	2
3	5	(Italy) Fabrizio Armetta	Chevrolet Lumina CR8	(Italy) Motorzone Race Car	1:57.048	3
4	18	(Italy) Massimo Pigoli	Mercedes C63 AMG	(Italy) Romeo Ferraris	1:57.707	4
5	2	(Italy) Stefano Gabellini	BMW M3 E92	(Italy) Team BMW Italia	1:57.720	5
6	23	(Spain) Sergio Hernández	BMW M3 E92	(Spain) Campos Racing	1:57.960	8^{1}
7	34	(Italy) Ermanno Dionisio	Audi RS4	(Italy) Hop Mobile Audi Sport Italia	1:57.992	6
8	32	(Spain) Isaac Tutumlu	BMW M3 E92	(Spain) Campos Racing	1:58.501	7
9	1	(Italy) Thomas Biagi	BMW M3 E92	(Italy) Team BMW Italia	1:58.563	9
10	37	(Italy) Riccardo Bossi	Audi RS4	(Italy) Hop Mobile Audi Sport Italia	1:59.063	10
11	48	(United Kingdom) Johnny Herbert	Mercedes C63 AMG	(Italy) Romeo Ferraris	2:00.153	11
12	41	(Italy) Francesco Sini	Jaguar XF SV8	(Italy) Ferlito Motors	2:00.433	12
13	88	(Italy) Michela Cerruti	Mercedes C63 AMG	(Italy) Romeo Ferraris	2:00.466	13
14	3	(Italy) Alberto Cerqui	BMW M3 E92	(Italy) Team BMW Italia	2:00.624	14
15	58	(Italy) Riccardo Romagnoli	Mercedes C63 AMG	(Italy) CAAL Racing	2:00.777	15
16	99	(Italy) Alex de Giacomi	BMW M3 E90	(Italy) Movisport	2:00.942	16
17	73	(Italy) Sandro Bettini	BMW M3 E90	(Italy) Movisport	2:01.126	17
18	12	(Italy) Francesca Linossi	BMW M3 E92	(Italy) Movisport	2:02.039	18
19	11	(Italy) Andrea Dromedari	Mercedes C63 AMG	(Italy) Romeo Ferraris	2:02.790	19
20	27	(Italy) Domenico Caldarola	Mercedes C63 AMG	(Italy) Roma Racing Team	2:04.194	20
21	24	(Italy) Roberto Benedetti	Cadillac CTS-V	(Italy) RC Motorsport	2:04.201	21
22	40	(Italy) Luigi Cecchi	Jaguar XF SV8	(Italy) Ferlito Motors	2:04.733	22
23	22	(Italy) Mauro Cesari	Chrysler 300C SRT8	(Italy) MRT by Nocentini	no time	23

Notes:

- ^1 – Sergio Hernández was given a two-place grid penalty for an irregular rear wing.

=== Race 1 ===
Pos.	No.	Driver	Car	Team	Laps	Time/Retired	Grid	Points
1	33	(Italy) Andrea Bertolini	Maserati Quattroporte	(Switzerland) Swiss Team	16	27:31.225	1	20+2
2	54	(Italy) Luigi Ferrara	Mercedes C63 AMG	(Italy) CAAL Racing	16	+1.559	2	15
3	1	(Italy) Thomas Biagi	BMW M3 E92	(Italy) Team BMW Italia	16	+11.791	9	12
4	18	(Italy) Massimo Pigoli	Mercedes C63 AMG	(Italy) Romeo Ferraris	16	+14.396	4	10
5	2	(Italy) Stefano Gabellini	BMW M3 E92	(Italy) Team BMW Italia	16	+17.155	5	8
6	48	(United Kingdom) Johnny Herbert	Mercedes C63 AMG	(Italy) Romeo Ferraris	16	+19.610	11	6
7	5	(Italy) Fabrizio Armetta	Chevrolet Lumina CR8	(Italy) Motorzone Race Car	16	+35.885	3	4
8	23	(Spain) Sergio Hernández	BMW M3 E92	(Spain) Campos Racing	16	+37.064	8	3
9	34	(Italy) Ermanno Dionisio	Audi RS4	(Italy) Hop Mobile Audi Sport Italia	16	+48.509	6	2
10	99	(Italy) Alex de Giacomi	BMW M3 E90	(Italy) Movisport	16	+55.464	16	1
11	11	(Italy) Andrea Dromedari	Mercedes C63 AMG	(Italy) Romeo Ferraris	16	+59.647	19	
12	3	(Italy) Alberto Cerqui	BMW M3 E92	(Italy) Team BMW Italia	16	+1:07.263	14	
13	12	(Italy) Francesca Linossi	BMW M3 E92	(Italy) Movisport	16	+1:31.703	18	
14	27	(Italy) Domenico Caldarola	Mercedes C63 AMG	(Italy) Roma Racing Team	16	+1:39.090	20	
15	41	(Italy) Francesco Sini	Jaguar XF SV8	(Italy) Ferlito Motors	16	+1:41.031^{2}	12	
16	73	(Italy) Sandro Bettini	BMW M3 E90	(Italy) Movisport	15	+1 lap	17	
17	40	(Italy) Luigi Cecchi	Jaguar XF SV8	(Italy) Ferlito Motors	15	+1 lap	22	
18	32	(Spain) Isaac Tutumlu	BMW M3 E92	(Spain) Campos Racing	14	Retired	7	
19	22	(Italy) Mauro Cesari	Chrysler 300C SRT8	(Italy) MRT by Nocentini	8	Retired	23	
Ret	37	(Italy) Riccardo Bossi	Audi RS4	(Italy) Hop Mobile Audi Sport Italia	5	Retired	10	
Ret	58	(Italy) Riccardo Romagnoli	Mercedes C63 AMG	(Italy) CAAL Racing	4	Retired	15	
Ret	88	(Italy) Michela Cerruti	Mercedes C63 AMG	(Italy) Romeo Ferraris	3	Retired	13	
Ret	24	(Italy) Roberto Benedetti	Cadillac CTS-V	(Italy) RC Motorsport	1	Retired	21	

Notes:

- ^2 – Francesco Sini was given a 25-second penalty for causing a collision with Riccardo Romagnoli.

=== Race 2 ===
Pos.	No.	Driver	Car	Team	Laps	Time/Retired	Grid	Points
1	54	(Italy) Luigi Ferrara	Mercedes C63 AMG	(Italy) CAAL Racing	16	27:34.945	2	20+1
2	33	(Italy) Andrea Bertolini	Maserati Quattroporte	(Switzerland) Swiss Team	16	+0.761	1	15
3	18	(Italy) Massimo Pigoli	Mercedes C63 AMG	(Italy) Romeo Ferraris	16	+1.479	4	12
4	1	(Italy) Thomas Biagi	BMW M3 E92	(Italy) Team BMW Italia	16	+5.038	9	10
5	2	(Italy) Stefano Gabellini	BMW M3 E92	(Italy) Team BMW Italia	16	+9.992	5	8
6	34	(Italy) Ermanno Dionisio	Audi RS4	(Italy) Hop Mobile Audi Sport Italia	16	+27.336	6	6
7	41	(Italy) Francesco Sini	Jaguar XF SV8	(Italy) Ferlito Motors	16	+29.079	12	4
8	58	(Italy) Riccardo Romagnoli	Mercedes C63 AMG	(Italy) CAAL Racing	16	+32.426	15	3
9	88	(Italy) Michela Cerruti	Mercedes C63 AMG	(Italy) Romeo Ferraris	16	+34.246	13	2
10	3	(Italy) Alberto Cerqui	BMW M3 E92	(Italy) Team BMW Italia	16	+37.745	14	1
11	11	(Italy) Andrea Dromedari	Mercedes C63 AMG	(Italy) Romeo Ferraris	16	+45.592	19	
12	99	(Italy) Alex de Giacomi	BMW M3 E90	(Italy) Movisport	16	+49.031	16	
13	24	(Italy) Roberto Benedetti	Cadillac CTS-V	(Italy) RC Motorsport	16	+1:10.999	21	
14	73	(Italy) Sandro Bettini	BMW M3 E90	(Italy) Movisport	16	+1:12.933	17	
15	27	(Italy) Domenico Caldarola	Mercedes C63 AMG	(Italy) Roma Racing Team	16	+1:31.034	20	
16	22	(Italy) Mauro Cesari	Chrysler 300C SRT8	(Italy) MRT by Nocentini	16	+1:31.350	23	
17	40	(Italy) Luigi Cecchi	Jaguar XF SV8	(Italy) Ferlito Motors	15	+1 lap	22	
18	48	(United Kingdom) Johnny Herbert	Mercedes C63 AMG	(Italy) Romeo Ferraris	13	Retired	11	
19	12	(Italy) Francesca Linossi	BMW M3 E92	(Italy) Movisport	11	Retired	18	
20	5	(Italy) Fabrizio Armetta	Chevrolet Lumina CR8	(Italy) Motorzone Race Car	8	Retired	3	
Ret	37	(Italy) Riccardo Bossi	Audi RS4	(Italy) Hop Mobile Audi Sport Italia	4	Retired	10	
Ret	23	(Spain) Sergio Hernández	BMW M3 E92	(Spain) Campos Racing	3	Retired	8	
Ret	32	(Spain) Isaac Tutumlu	BMW M3 E92	(Spain) Campos Racing	1	Retired	7	

== Standings after the event ==
International Series standings

	Pos	Driver	Points
4	1	(Italy) Luigi Ferrara	51
	2	(Italy) Massimo Pigoli	43
2	3	(Italy) Michela Cerruti	37
	4	(Italy) Andrea Bertolini	37
2	5	(Italy) Thomas Biagi	35

Teams' Championship standings

	Pos	Driver	Points
	1	(Italy) Romeo Ferraris	86
	2	(Italy) Team BMW Italia	70
	3	(Italy) CAAL Racing	66
1	4	(Switzerland) Swiss Team	49
1	5	(Italy) Ferlito Motors	19

- Note: Only the top five positions are included for both sets of drivers' standings.
