= 2011 Superstars Series Misano-1 round =

(Italy) 2011 Superstars Series Misano-1 round
Round details
- Round 4 of 9 rounds in the 2011 Superstars Series
- Layout of the Misano World Circuit
- Location: Misano World Circuit, Misano Adriatico, Italy
- Course: Permanent racing facility 4.064 km (2.525 mi)

Superstars Series

Race 1
- Date: 5 June 2011
- Laps: 16

Pole position
| Driver | (Italy) Massimo Pigoli | Romeo Ferraris |
- Time: 1:42.015

Podium
| First | (Italy) Luigi Ferrara | CAAL Racing |
| Second | (Italy) Massimo Pigoli | Romeo Ferraris |
| Third | (Italy) Alberto Cerqui | Team BMW Italia |

Fastest lap
| Driver | (Italy) Thomas Biagi | Team BMW Italia |
- Time: 1:42.965 (on lap 9)

Race 2
- Date: 5 June 2011
- Laps: 13

Podium
| First | (Italy) Massimo Pigoli | Romeo Ferraris |
| Second | (Italy) Thomas Biagi | Team BMW Italia |
| Third | (San Marino) Christian Montanari | RGA Sportmanship |

Fastest lap
| Driver | (Italy) Ermanno Dionisio | Hop Mobile Audi Sport Italia |
- Time: 2:03.158 (on lap 11)

The 2011 Superstars Series Misano-1 round was the fourth round of the 2011 Superstars Series season. It took place on 5 June at the Misano World Circuit.

Luigi Ferrara won the first race, starting from third position, and Massimo Pigoli won the second one, both driving a Mercedes C63 AMG.

== Classification ==
=== Qualifying ===
| Pos. | No. | Driver | Car | Team | Time | Grid |
|---|---|---|---|---|---|---|
| 1 | 18 | (Italy) Massimo Pigoli | Mercedes C63 AMG | (Italy) Romeo Ferraris | 1:42.015 | 1 |
| 2 | 1 | (Italy) Thomas Biagi | BMW M3 E92 | (Italy) Team BMW Italia | 1:42.111 | 2 |
| 3 | 54 | (Italy) Luigi Ferrara | Mercedes C63 AMG | (Italy) CAAL Racing | 1:42.168 | 3 |
| 4 | 2 | (Italy) Stefano Gabellini | BMW M3 E92 | (Italy) Team BMW Italia | 1:42.483 | 4 |
| 5 | 21 | (San Marino) Christian Montanari | BMW M3 E92 | (Italy) RGA Sportmanship | 1:42.648 | 5 |
| 6 | 3 | (Italy) Alberto Cerqui | BMW M3 E92 | (Italy) Team BMW Italia | 1:42.739 | 6 |
| 7 | 73 | (Italy) Ivan Tramontozzi | BMW M3 E90 | (Italy) Movisport | 1:43.058 | 7 |
| 8 | 41 | (Italy) Francesco Sini | Jaguar XFR | (Italy) Ferlito Motors | 1:43.206 | 8 |
| 9 | 69 | (Italy) Kristian Ghedina | BMW M3 E92 | (Italy) RGA Sportmanship | 1:43.307 | 9 |
| 10 | 58 | (Italy) Riccardo Romagnoli | Mercedes C63 AMG | (Italy) CAAL Racing | 1:43.319 | 10 |
| 11 | 11 | (Italy) Andrea Dromedari | Mercedes C63 AMG | (Italy) Romeo Ferraris | 1:43.383 | 11 |
| 12 | 99 | (Italy) Alex de Giacomi | BMW M3 E90 | (Italy) Movisport | 1:43.414 | 12 |
| 13 | 88 | (Italy) Michela Cerruti | Mercedes C63 AMG | (Italy) Romeo Ferraris | 1:43.527 | 13 |
| 14 | 22 | (Italy) Mauro Cesari | Chrysler 300C SRT8 | (Italy) MRT by Nocentini | 1:43.965 | 14 |
| 15 | 27 | (Italy) Domenico Caldarola | Mercedes C63 AMG | (Italy) Roma Racing Team | 1:44.987 | 15 |
| 16 | 12 | (Italy) Francesca Linossi | BMW M3 E92 | (Italy) Movisport | 1:45.133 | 16 |
| 17 | 37 | (Italy) Riccardo Bossi | Audi RS4 | (Italy) Hop Mobile Audi Sport Italia | 1:45.338 | 17 |
| 18 | 34 | (Italy) Ermanno Dionisio | Audi RS4 | (Italy) Hop Mobile Audi Sport Italia | 1:45.444 | 18 |
| 19 | 56 | (Italy) Leonardo Baccarelli | BMW 550i E60 | (Italy) CAAL Racing | 1:46.915 | 19 |
| 20 | 40 | (Italy) Luigi Cecchi | Jaguar XFR | (Italy) Ferlito Motors | 1:46.998 | 20 |
| 21 | 8 | (Italy) Francesco Ascani | BMW M3 E90 | (Italy) Movisport | 1:47.001 | 21 |
| 22 | 24 | (Italy) Roberto Benedetti | Cadillac CTS-V | (Italy) RC Motorsport | 1:47.628 | 22 |

=== Race 1 ===
| Pos. | No. | Driver | Car | Team | Laps | Time/Retired | Grid | Points |
|---|---|---|---|---|---|---|---|---|
| 1 | 54 | (Italy) Luigi Ferrara | Mercedes C63 AMG | (Italy) CAAL Racing | 16 | 27:48.599 | 3 | 20 |
| 2 | 18 | (Italy) Massimo Pigoli | Mercedes C63 AMG | (Italy) Romeo Ferraris | 16 | +0.934 | 1 | 15+1 |
| 3 | 3 | (Italy) Alberto Cerqui | BMW M3 E92 | (Italy) Team BMW Italia | 16 | +1.314 | 6 | 12 |
| 4 | 1 | (Italy) Thomas Biagi | BMW M3 E92 | (Italy) Team BMW Italia | 16 | +1.917 | 2 | 10+1 |
| 5 | 58 | (Italy) Riccardo Romagnoli | Mercedes C63 AMG | (Italy) CAAL Racing | 16 | +25.204 | 10 | 8 |
| 6 | 21 | (San Marino) Christian Montanari | BMW M3 E92 | (Italy) RGA Sportmanship | 16 | +27.809 | 5 | 6 |
| 7 | 69 | (Italy) Kristian Ghedina | BMW M3 E92 | (Italy) RGA Sportmanship | 16 | +28.447 | 9 | 4 |
| 8 | 41 | (Italy) Francesco Sini | Jaguar XFR | (Italy) Ferlito Motors | 16 | +32.384 | 8 | 3 |
| 9 | 2 | (Italy) Stefano Gabellini | BMW M3 E92 | (Italy) Team BMW Italia | 16 | +34.021 | 4 | 2 |
| 10 | 99 | (Italy) Alex de Giacomi | BMW M3 E90 | (Italy) Movisport | 16 | +37.590 | 12 | 1 |
| 11 | 34 | (Italy) Ermanno Dionisio | Audi RS4 | (Italy) Hop Mobile Audi Sport Italia | 16 | +44.217 | 18 | |
| 12 | 88 | (Italy) Michela Cerruti | Mercedes C63 AMG | (Italy) Romeo Ferraris | 16 | +1:01.956 | 13 | |
| 13 | 12 | (Italy) Francesca Linossi | BMW M3 E92 | (Italy) Movisport | 16 | +1:21.456 | 16 | |
| 14 | 8 | (Italy) Francesco Ascani | BMW M3 E90 | (Italy) Movisport | 16 | +1:30.610 | 21 | |
| 15 | 56 | (Italy) Leonardo Baccarelli | BMW 550i E60 | (Italy) CAAL Racing | 16 | +1:51.057 | 19 | |
| 16 | 37 | (Italy) Riccardo Bossi | Audi RS4 | (Italy) Hop Mobile Audi Sport Italia | 16 | +2:00.972 | 17 | |
| Ret | 24 | (Italy) Roberto Benedetti | Cadillac CTS-V | (Italy) RC Motorsport | 7 | Retired | 22 | |
| Ret | 73 | (Italy) Ivan Tramontozzi | BMW M3 E90 | (Italy) Movisport | 6 | Retired | 7 | |
| Ret | 40 | (Italy) Luigi Cecchi | Jaguar XFR | (Italy) Ferlito Motors | 6 | Retired | 20 | |
| Ret | 11 | (Italy) Andrea Dromedari | Mercedes C63 AMG | (Italy) Romeo Ferraris | 6 | Retired | 11 | |
| Ret | 22 | (Italy) Mauro Cesari | Chrysler 300C SRT8 | (Italy) MRT by Nocentini | 0 | Retired | 14 | |
| Ret | 27 | (Italy) Domenico Caldarola | Mercedes C63 AMG | (Italy) Roma Racing Team | 0 | Retired | 15 | |

=== Race 2 ===
| Pos. | No. | Driver | Car | Team | Laps | Time/Retired | Grid | Points |
|---|---|---|---|---|---|---|---|---|
| 1 | 18 | (Italy) Massimo Pigoli | Mercedes C63 AMG | (Italy) Romeo Ferraris | 13 | 28:26.629 | 1 | 20 |
| 2 | 1 | (Italy) Thomas Biagi | BMW M3 E92 | (Italy) Team BMW Italia | 13 | +6.273 | 2 | 15 |
| 3 | 21 | (San Marino) Christian Montanari | BMW M3 E92 | (Italy) RGA Sportmanship | 13 | +6.295 | 5 | 12 |
| 4 | 37 | (Italy) Riccardo Bossi | Audi RS4 | (Italy) Hop Mobile Audi Sport Italia | 13 | +10.936 | 17 | 10 |
| 5 | 73 | (Italy) Ivan Tramontozzi | BMW M3 E90 | (Italy) Movisport | 13 | +14.239 | 7 | 8 |
| 6 | 2 | (Italy) Stefano Gabellini | BMW M3 E92 | (Italy) Team BMW Italia | 13 | +15.555 | 4 | 6 |
| 7 | 54 | (Italy) Luigi Ferrara | Mercedes C63 AMG | (Italy) CAAL Racing | 13 | +17.310 | 3 | 4 |
| 8 | 99 | (Italy) Alex de Giacomi | BMW M3 E90 | (Italy) Movisport | 13 | +22.229 | 12 | 3 |
| 9 | 41 | (Italy) Francesco Sini | Jaguar XFR | (Italy) Ferlito Motors | 13 | +24.665 | 8 | 2 |
| 10 | 24 | (Italy) Roberto Benedetti | Cadillac CTS-V | (Italy) RC Motorsport | 13 | +25.001 | 22 | 1 |
| 11 | 58 | (Italy) Riccardo Romagnoli | Mercedes C63 AMG | (Italy) CAAL Racing | 13 | +34.688 | 10 | |
| 12 | 11 | (Italy) Andrea Dromedari | Mercedes C63 AMG | (Italy) Romeo Ferraris | 13 | +46.226 | 11 | |
| 13 | 12 | (Italy) Francesca Linossi | BMW M3 E92 | (Italy) Movisport | 13 | +46.840 | 16 | |
| 14 | 88 | (Italy) Michela Cerruti | Mercedes C63 AMG | (Italy) Romeo Ferraris | 13 | +48.642 | 13 | |
| 15 | 8 | (Italy) Francesco Ascani | BMW M3 E90 | (Italy) Movisport | 13 | +50.699 | 21 | |
| 16 | 27 | (Italy) Domenico Caldarola | Mercedes C63 AMG | (Italy) Roma Racing Team | 13 | +1:01.873 | 15 | |
| 17 | 34 | (Italy) Ermanno Dionisio | Audi RS4 | (Italy) Hop Mobile Audi Sport Italia | 12 | Retired | 18 | 1 |
| 18 | 56 | (Italy) Leonardo Baccarelli | BMW 550i E60 | (Italy) CAAL Racing | 12 | +1 lap | 19 | |
| 19 | 3 | (Italy) Alberto Cerqui | BMW M3 E92 | (Italy) Team BMW Italia | 11 | Retired | 6 | 1 |
| Ret | 69 | (Italy) Kristian Ghedina | BMW M3 E92 | (Italy) RGA Sportmanship | 5 | Retired | 9 | |
| Ret | 40 | (Italy) Luigi Cecchi | Jaguar XFR | (Italy) Ferlito Motors | 4 | Retired | 20 | |
| Ret | 22 | (Italy) Mauro Cesari | Chrysler 300C SRT8 | (Italy) MRT by Nocentini | 0 | Retired | 14 | |

== Standings after the event ==
Italian Championship standings

| | Pos | Driver | Points |
|---|---|---|---|
| 1 | 1 | (Italy) Massimo Pigoli | 57 |
| 3 | 2 | (Italy) Luigi Ferrara | 39 |
| 4 | 3 | (Italy) Thomas Biagi | 39 |
| 3 | 4 | (Italy) Michela Cerruti | 35 |
| 2 | 5 | (Italy) Alberto Cerqui | 28 |

- Note: Only the top five positions are included for both sets of drivers' standings.
