= 2011 Superstars Series Portimão round =

(Portugal) 2011 Superstars Series Portimão round
Round details
- Round 3 of 9 rounds in the 2011 Superstars Series
- Layout of the Algarve International Circuit
- Location: Algarve International Circuit, Portimão, Portugal
- Course: Permanent racing facility 4.658 km (2.894 mi)

Superstars Series

Race 1
- Date: 22 May 2011
- Laps: 15

Pole position
Driver	(Italy) Alberto Cerqui	Team BMW Italia
- Time: 1:51.174

Podium
First	(Italy) Thomas Biagi	Team BMW Italia
Second	(Italy) Alberto Cerqui	Team BMW Italia
Third	(Italy) Stefano Gabellini	Team BMW Italia

Fastest lap
Driver	(Italy) Thomas Biagi	Team BMW Italia
- Time: 1:52.103

Race 2
- Date: 22 May 2011
- Laps: 15

Podium
First	(Italy) Thomas Biagi	Team BMW Italia
Second	(Italy) Alberto Cerqui	Team BMW Italia
Third	(Italy) Stefano Gabellini	Team BMW Italia

Fastest lap
Driver	(Italy) Andrea Bertolini	Swiss Team
- Time: 1:52.233

The 2011 Superstars Series Portimão round was the third round of the 2011 Superstars Series. It took place on 22 May at the Algarve International Circuit.

Thomas Biagi won both races, driving a BMW M3 E92.

== Classification ==
=== Qualifying ===
Pos.	No.	Driver	Car	Team	Time	Grid
1	3	(Italy) Alberto Cerqui	BMW M3 E92	(Italy) Team BMW Italia	1:51.174	1
2	33	(Italy) Andrea Bertolini	Maserati Quattroporte	(Switzerland) Swiss Team	1:51.330	2
3	1	(Italy) Thomas Biagi	BMW M3 E92	(Italy) Team BMW Italia	1:51.519	3
4	2	(Italy) Stefano Gabellini	BMW M3 E92	(Italy) Team BMW Italia	1:51.536	4
5	48	(United Kingdom) Johnny Herbert	Mercedes C63 AMG	(Italy) Romeo Ferraris	1:51.755	5
6	54	(Italy) Luigi Ferrara	Mercedes C63 AMG	(Italy) CAAL Racing	1:52.183	6
7	18	(Italy) Massimo Pigoli	Mercedes C63 AMG	(Italy) Romeo Ferraris	1:52.430	7
8	88	(Italy) Michela Cerruti	Mercedes C63 AMG	(Italy) Romeo Ferraris	1:52.513	8
9	41	(Italy) Francesco Sini	Jaguar XF SV8	(Italy) Ferlito Motors	1:52.810	9
10	5	(Italy) Fabrizio Armetta	Chevrolet Lumina CR8	(Italy) Motorzone Race Car	1:53.543	10
11	58	(Italy) Riccardo Romagnoli	Mercedes C63 AMG	(Italy) CAAL Racing	1:53.727	11
12	12	(Italy) Francesca Linossi	BMW M3 E92	(Italy) Movisport	1:53.883	12
13	46	(Switzerland) Andrea Chiesa	Maserati Quattroporte	(Switzerland) Swiss Team	1:53.920	13
14	11	(Italy) Andrea Dromedari	Mercedes C63 AMG	(Italy) Romeo Ferraris	1:54.042	14
15	23	(Spain) Sergio Hernández	BMW M3 E92	(Spain) Campos Racing	1:54.009	15
16	32	(Spain) Isaac Tutumlu	BMW M3 E92	(Spain) Campos Racing	1:54.185	16
17	99	(Italy) Alex de Giacomi	BMW M3 E90	(Italy) Movisport	1:54.536	17
18	73	(Italy) Sandro Bettini	BMW M3 E90	(Italy) Movisport	1:54.700	18
19	22	(Italy) Mauro Cesari	Chrysler 300C SRT8	(Italy) MRT by Nocentini	1:54.784	19
20	40	(Italy) Luigi Cecchi	Jaguar XF SV8	(Italy) Ferlito Motors	1:58.363	20
21	16	(Italy) Alessandro Tambussi	BMW 550i E60	(Italy) Movisport	2:05.896	21

=== Race 1 ===
Pos.	No.	Driver	Car	Team	Laps	Time/Retired	Grid	Points
1	1	(Italy) Thomas Biagi	BMW M3 E92	(Italy) Team BMW Italia	15	28:15.249	3	20+1
2	3	(Italy) Alberto Cerqui	BMW M3 E92	(Italy) Team BMW Italia	15	+2.529	1	15+1
3	2	(Italy) Stefano Gabellini	BMW M3 E92	(Italy) Team BMW Italia	15	+8.844	4	12
4	33	(Italy) Andrea Bertolini	Maserati Quattroporte	(Switzerland) Swiss Team	15	+23.643	2	10
5	54	(Italy) Luigi Ferrara	Mercedes C63 AMG	(Italy) CAAL Racing	15	+29.253	6	8
6	5	(Italy) Fabrizio Armetta	Chevrolet Lumina CR8	(Italy) Motorzone Race Car	15	+34.435	10	6
7	18	(Italy) Massimo Pigoli	Mercedes C63 AMG	(Italy) Romeo Ferraris	15	+35.805	7	4
8	88	(Italy) Michela Cerruti	Mercedes C63 AMG	(Italy) Romeo Ferraris	15	+39.596	8	3
9	46	(Switzerland) Andrea Chiesa	Maserati Quattroporte	(Switzerland) Swiss Team	15	+47.632	13	2
10	58	(Italy) Riccardo Romagnoli	Mercedes C63 AMG	(Italy) CAAL Racing	15	+51.449	11	1
11	32	(Spain) Isaac Tutumlu	BMW M3 E92	(Spain) Campos Racing	15	+1:03.870	16	
12	73	(Italy) Sandro Bettini	BMW M3 E90	(Italy) Movisport	15	+1:04.009	18	
13	11	(Italy) Andrea Dromedari	Mercedes C63 AMG	(Italy) Romeo Ferraris	15	+1:04.045	14	
14	22	(Italy) Mauro Cesari	Chrysler 300C SRT8	(Italy) MRT by Nocentini	15	+1:29.077	19	
15	48	(United Kingdom) Johnny Herbert	Mercedes C63 AMG	(Italy) Romeo Ferraris	14	+1 lap	5	
16	16	(Italy) Alessandro Tambussi	BMW 550i E60	(Italy) Movisport	14	+1 lap	21	
17	99	(Italy) Alex de Giacomi	BMW M3 E90	(Italy) Movisport	11	Retired	17	
18	12	(Italy) Francesca Linossi	BMW M3 E92	(Italy) Movisport	10	Retired	12	
19	23	(Spain) Sergio Hernández	BMW M3 E92	(Spain) Campos Racing	10	Retired	15	
Ret	41	(Italy) Francesco Sini	Jaguar XF SV8	(Italy) Ferlito Motors	4	Retired	9	
Ret	40	(Italy) Luigi Cecchi	Jaguar XF SV8	(Italy) Ferlito Motors	1	Retired	20	

=== Race 2 ===
Pos.	No.	Driver	Car	Team	Laps	Time/Retired	Grid	Points
1	1	(Italy) Thomas Biagi	BMW M3 E92	(Italy) Team BMW Italia	15	28:23.229	3	20
2	3	(Italy) Alberto Cerqui	BMW M3 E92	(Italy) Team BMW Italia	15	+1.649	1	15
3	2	(Italy) Stefano Gabellini	BMW M3 E92	(Italy) Team BMW Italia	15	+18.692	4	12
4	18	(Italy) Massimo Pigoli	Mercedes C63 AMG	(Italy) Romeo Ferraris	15	+24.339	7	10
5	54	(Italy) Luigi Ferrara	Mercedes C63 AMG	(Italy) CAAL Racing	15	+33.670	6	8
6	46	(Switzerland) Andrea Chiesa	Maserati Quattroporte	(Switzerland) Swiss Team	15	+38.935	13	6
7	58	(Italy) Riccardo Romagnoli	Mercedes C63 AMG	(Italy) CAAL Racing	15	+46.486	11	4
8	11	(Italy) Andrea Dromedari	Mercedes C63 AMG	(Italy) Romeo Ferraris	15	+59.585	14	3
9	22	(Italy) Mauro Cesari	Chrysler 300C SRT8	(Italy) MRT by Nocentini	15	+1:01.091	19	2
10	73	(Italy) Sandro Bettini	BMW M3 E90	(Italy) Movisport	15	+1:01.500	18	1
11	12	(Italy) Francesca Linossi	BMW M3 E92	(Italy) Movisport	15	+1:11.998	12	
12	40	(Italy) Luigi Cecchi	Jaguar XF SV8	(Italy) Ferlito Motors	15	+2:07.334	20	
13	5	(Italy) Fabrizio Armetta	Chevrolet Lumina CR8	(Italy) Motorzone Race Car	14	Retired	10	
14	16	(Italy) Alessandro Tambussi	BMW 550i E60	(Italy) Movisport	14	+1 lap	21	
15	32	(Spain) Isaac Tutumlu	BMW M3 E92	(Spain) Campos Racing	12	Retired	16	
16	23	(Spain) Sergio Hernández	BMW M3 E92	(Spain) Campos Racing	10	Retired	15	
17	99	(Italy) Alex de Giacomi	BMW M3 E90	(Italy) Movisport	9	Retired	17	
18	48	(United Kingdom) Johnny Herbert	Mercedes C63 AMG	(Italy) Romeo Ferraris	8	Retired	5	
Ret	33	(Italy) Andrea Bertolini	Maserati Quattroporte	(Switzerland) Swiss Team	7	Retired	2	1
Ret	41	(Italy) Francesco Sini	Jaguar XF SV8	(Italy) Ferlito Motors	6	Retired	9	
Ret	88	(Italy) Michela Cerruti	Mercedes C63 AMG	(Italy) Romeo Ferraris	0	Retired	8	

== Standings after the event ==
International Series standings

	Pos	Driver	Points
4	1	(Italy) Thomas Biagi	76
1	2	(Italy) Luigi Ferrara	67
1	3	(Italy) Massimo Pigoli	57
2	4	(Italy) Stefano Gabellini	52
1	5	(Italy) Andrea Bertolini	48

Teams' Championship standings

	Pos	Driver	Points
1	1	(Italy) Team BMW Italia	142
1	2	(Italy) Romeo Ferraris	106
	3	(Italy) CAAL Racing	87
	4	(Switzerland) Swiss Team	68
	5	(Italy) Ferlito Motors	19

- Note: Only the top five positions are included for both sets of drivers' standings.
