= 2011 Superstars Series =

Seasons
- ← 2010 2012 →

The 2011 Superstars Series season was the eighth year of the Superstars Series, an Italian-based touring car racing series, featuring the eighth edition of the Campionato Italiano Superstars (Italian Superstars Championship) and the fifth year of the International Superstars Series. The season began at Monza on April 10, and finished at Vallelunga on October 10, after nine rounds. Eight of the nine rounds counted towards the International title, won by Andrea Bertolini driving for Maserati, with six rounds counting towards the Italian title, won by Alberto Cerqui driving for BMW.

== Teams and drivers ==
- All teams used Michelin tyres.

| Team | Car | No. | Drivers | Rounds |
|---|---|---|---|---|
| (Italy) Team BMW Italia | BMW M3 (E92) | 1 | (Italy) Thomas Biagi | All |
| (Italy) Team BMW Italia | BMW M3 (E92) | 2 | (Italy) Stefano Gabellini | All |
| (Italy) Team BMW Italia | BMW M3 (E92) | 3 | (Italy) Alberto Cerqui | All |
| (Italy) Motorzone Race Car | Chevrolet Lumina CR8 | 5 | (Italy) Fabrizio Armetta | 1–3, 5–6, 9 |
| (Italy) Motorzone Race Car | Chevrolet Lumina CR8 | 10 | (Russia) Alessandro Vita Kouzkin | 1 |
| (Italy) MN Motorsport | Lexus IS-F | 6 | (Italy) Diego Romanini | 6 |
| (Italy) Movisport | BMW M3 (E90) | 8 | (Italy) Francesco Ascani | 1, 4–6 |
| (Italy) Movisport | BMW M3 (E92) | 12 | (Italy) Francesca Linossi | 1–4, 6 |
| (Italy) Movisport | BMW M3 (E92) | 12 | (Italy) Gianluca de Lorenzi | 9 |
| (Italy) Movisport | BMW 550i (E60) | 16 | (Italy) Alessandro Tambussi | 3, 7 |
| (Italy) Movisport | BMW 550i (E60) | 16 | (Italy) Giampiero Pindari | 5, 7 |
| (Italy) Movisport | BMW 550i (E60) | 16 | (Italy) Luciano Linossi | 5 |
| (Italy) Movisport | BMW 550i (E60) | 16 | (Italy) Niccolò Mercatali | 6 |
| (Italy) Movisport | BMW M3 (E90) | 73 | (Italy) Niccolò Mercatali | 9 |
| (Italy) Movisport | BMW M3 (E90) | 73 | (Italy) Sandro Bettini | 1–3, 6–9 |
| (Italy) Movisport | BMW M3 (E90) | 73 | (Italy) Ivan Tramontozzi | 4–5 |
| (Italy) Movisport | BMW M3 (E90) | 99 | (Italy) Alex De Giacomi | 1–6 |
| (Italy) Movisport | BMW M3 (E90) | 99 | (Italy) Alessandro Garofano | 7 |
| (Italy) Movisport | BMW M3 (E90) | 99 | (Italy) Gianluca de Lorenzi | 8 |
| (Italy) Movisport | BMW M3 (E90) | 99 | (Italy) Roberto Papini | 9 |
| (Italy) Todi Corse | BMW M3 (E90) | 8 | (Italy) Francesco Ascani | 7–9 |
| (Italy) Todi Corse | BMW 550i (E60) | 56 | (Italy) Leonardo Baccarelli | 7–9 |
| (Italy) Romeo Ferraris | Mercedes C63 AMG | 11 | (Italy) Andrea Dromedari | All |
| (Italy) Romeo Ferraris | Mercedes C63 AMG | 18 | (Italy) Max Pigoli | All |
| (Italy) Romeo Ferraris | Mercedes C63 AMG | 48 | (United Kingdom) Johnny Herbert | 1–3, 5–9 |
| (Italy) Romeo Ferraris | Mercedes C63 AMG | 88 | (Italy) Michela Cerruti | All |
| (Italy) RGA Sportsmanship | BMW M3 (E92) | 21 | (San Marino) Christian Montanari | 1, 4–6 |
| (Italy) RGA Sportsmanship | BMW M3 (E92) | 69 | (Italy) Kristian Ghedina | 1, 4 |
| (Italy) RGA Sportsmanship | BMW M3 (E92) | 69 | (Italy) Alessandro Garofano | 6 |
| (Italy) RGA Sportsmanship | BMW M3 (E92) | 69 | (Italy) Mauro Cesari | 5 |
| (Italy) MRT by Nocentini | Chrysler 300C SRT-8 | 22 | (Italy) Mauro Cesari | 2–4, 6–8 |
| (Spain) Campos Racing | BMW M3 (E92) | 23 | (Spain) Sergio Hernández | 1–3, 6 |
| (Spain) Campos Racing | BMW M3 (E92) | 32 | (Spain) Isaac Tutumlu | 1–3 |
| (Italy) RC Motorsport | Cadillac CTS-V | 24 | (Italy) Roberto Benedetti | 1–2, 4, 6–9 |
| (Italy) Roma Racing Team | Mercedes C63 AMG | 27 | (San Marino) Nico Caldarola | 1–2, 4, 6 |
| (Italy) Roma Racing Team | Mercedes C63 AMG | 27 | (San Marino) Christian Montanari | 9 |
| (Italy) Roma Racing Team | Mercedes C63 AMG | 27 | (Italy) Marco Cassarà | 9 |
| (Italy) Roma Racing Team | Mercedes C63 AMG | 27 | (Italy) Luca Rangoni | 8 |
| (Italy) Roma Racing Team | Mercedes C63 AMG | 28 | (Italy) Luca Rangoni | 6 |
| (Italy) Roma Racing Team | Mercedes C63 AMG | 28 | (Italy) Felice Tedeschi | 8 |
| (Italy) Roma Racing Team | Mercedes C63 AMG | 28 | (Italy) Francesco Sini | 9 |
| (Switzerland) Swiss Team | Maserati Quattroporte | 33 | (Italy) Andrea Bertolini | 2–3, 5–9 |
| (Switzerland) Swiss Team | Maserati Quattroporte | 46 | (Italy) Andrea Bertolini | 1 |
| (Switzerland) Swiss Team | Maserati Quattroporte | 46 | (Switzerland) Andrea Chiesa | 1, 3 |
| (Switzerland) Swiss Team | Maserati Quattroporte | 46 | (Italy) Alessandro Pier Guidi | 5–9 |
| (Italy) Hopmobile Audi Sport Italia | Audi RS4 | 34 | (Italy) Ermanno Dionisio | 1–2, 4, 6 |
| (Italy) Hopmobile Audi Sport Italia | Audi RS4 | 34 | (Italy) Alberto Cola | 8–9 |
| (Italy) Hopmobile Audi Sport Italia | Audi RS4 | 35 | (Italy) Roberto Papini | 1 |
| (Italy) Hopmobile Audi Sport Italia | Audi RS4 | 35 | (Germany) Thomas Schöffler | 6 |
| (Italy) Hopmobile Audi Sport Italia | Audi RS4 | 37 | (Italy) Riccardo Bossi | 1–2, 4, 6, 8–9 |
| (Italy) Hopmobile Audi Sport Italia | Audi RS4 | 45 | (Italy) Gianni Morbidelli | 6–9 |
| (Italy) Ferlito Motors | Jaguar XFR | 40 | (Italy) Luigi Cecchi | All |
| (Italy) Ferlito Motors | Jaguar XFR | 41 | (Italy) Francesco Sini | 1–8 |
| (Italy) Ferlito Motors | Jaguar XFR | 41 | (Italy) Mauro Cesari | 9 |
| (Italy) CAAL Racing | Mercedes C63 AMG | 54 | (Italy) Luigi Ferrara | All |
| (Italy) CAAL Racing | Mercedes C63 AMG | 58 | (Italy) Riccardo Romagnoli | 1–5, 7–9 |
| (Italy) CAAL Racing | BMW 550i (E60) | 56 | (Italy) Leonardo Baccarelli | 4, 6 |

== Calendar ==
| Round | Circuit/Location | Date |
|---|---|---|
| 1 | (Italy) Autodromo Nazionale Monza | April 10 |
| 2 | (Spain) Circuit Ricardo Tormo, Valencia | May 8 |
| 3 | (Portugal) Autódromo Internacional do Algarve, Portimão | May 22 |
| 4 | (Italy) Misano World Circuit | June 5 |
| 5 | (United Kingdom) Donington Park, Leicestershire | June 19 |
| 6 | (Italy) Misano World Circuit | July 10 |
| 7 | (Belgium) Circuit de Spa-Francorchamps | August 7 |
| 8 | (Italy) Autodromo Internazionale del Mugello | September 25 |
| 9 | (Italy) Autodromo Vallelunga "Piero Taruffi", Campagnano | October 9 |

International Superstars Series only
Campionato Italiano Superstars only
Both championships

== Results ==
| Round | | Circuit | Pole position | Fastest lap | Winning driver | Winning team | Report |
|---|---|---|---|---|---|---|---|
| 1 | R1 | Monza | (Italy) Max Pigoli | (Italy) Luigi Ferrara | (Italy) Max Pigoli | (Italy) Romeo Ferraris | Report |
| 1 | R2 | Monza | | (Italy) Luigi Ferrara | (Italy) Michela Cerruti | (Italy) Romeo Ferraris | Report |
| 2 | R1 | Valencia | (Italy) Andrea Bertolini | (Italy) Andrea Bertolini | (Italy) Andrea Bertolini | (Switzerland) Swiss Team | Report |
| 2 | R2 | Valencia | | (Italy) Luigi Ferrara | (Italy) Luigi Ferrara | (Italy) CAAL Racing | Report |
| 3 | R1 | Portimão | (Italy) Alberto Cerqui | (Italy) Thomas Biagi | (Italy) Thomas Biagi | (Italy) Team BMW Italia | Report |
| 3 | R2 | Portimão | | (Italy) Andrea Bertolini | (Italy) Thomas Biagi | (Italy) Team BMW Italia | Report |
| 4 | R1 | Misano | (Italy) Max Pigoli | (Italy) Thomas Biagi | (Italy) Luigi Ferrara | (Italy) CAAL Racing | Report |
| 4 | R2 | Misano | | (Italy) Ermanno Dionisio | (Italy) Max Pigoli | (Italy) Romeo Ferraris | Report |
| 5 | R1 | Donington Park | (Italy) Alberto Cerqui | (Italy) Luigi Ferrara | (Italy) Andrea Bertolini | (Switzerland) Swiss Team | Report |
| 5 | R2 | Donington Park | | (Italy) Andrea Bertolini | (Italy) Andrea Bertolini | (Switzerland) Swiss Team | Report |
| 6 | R1 | Misano | (Italy) Alberto Cerqui | (Italy) Alberto Cerqui | (Italy) Alberto Cerqui | (Italy) Team BMW Italia | Report |
| 6 | R2 | Misano | | (Italy) Alessandro Pier Guidi | (Italy) Luca Rangoni | (Italy) Roma Racing Team | Report |
| 7 | R1 | Spa-Francorchamps | (Italy) Andrea Bertolini | (United Kingdom) Johnny Herbert | (Italy) Andrea Bertolini | (Switzerland) Swiss Team | Report |
| 7 | R2 | Spa-Francorchamps | | (Italy) Luigi Ferrara | (Italy) Andrea Bertolini | (Switzerland) Swiss Team | Report |
| 8 | R1 | Mugello | (Italy) Alberto Cerqui | (Italy) Alberto Cerqui | (Italy) Alberto Cerqui | (Italy) Team BMW Italia | Report |
| 8 | R2 | Mugello | | (Italy) Thomas Biagi | (Italy) Alberto Cerqui | (Italy) Team BMW Italia | Report |
| 9 | R1 | Vallelunga | (Italy) Andrea Bertolini | (Italy) Andrea Bertolini | (Italy) Andrea Bertolini | (Switzerland) Swiss Team | Report |
| 9 | R2 | Vallelunga | | (Italy) Gianni Morbidelli | (Italy) Andrea Bertolini | (Switzerland) Swiss Team | Report |

== Championship standings ==
Scoring system

| Position | 1st | 2nd | 3rd | 4th | 5th | 6th | 7th | 8th | 9th | 10th | Pole | Fastest Lap |
| Points | 20 | 15 | 12 | 10 | 8 | 6 | 4 | 3 | 2 | 1 | 1 | 1 |

=== Campionato Italiano Superstars ===
| Pos | Driver | MNZ (Italy) | | MIS (Italy) | | MIS (Italy) | | SPA (Belgium) | | MUG (Italy) | | VAL (Italy) | | Pts |
|---|---|---|---|---|---|---|---|---|---|---|---|---|---|---|
| 1 | (Italy) Alberto Cerqui | 5 | 5 | 3 | 19 | **1** | 3 | 7 | Ret | **1** | 1 | 3 | 6 | 126 |
| 2 | (Italy) Max Pigoli | **1** | 11 | **2** | 1 | Ret | Ret | 5 | 2 | 3 | 5 | 7 | 4 | 114 |
| 3 | (Italy) Luigi Ferrara | 3 | 10 | 1 | 7 | 2 | 4 | 2 | 3 | 6 | 7 | 6 | 8 | 111 |
| 4 | (Italy) Thomas Biagi | 4 | 8 | 4 | 2 | 3 | 18 | 6 | 4 | 4 | 2 | 4 | 10 | 104 |
| 5 | (Italy) Andrea Bertolini | 14 | | | | 6 | 13 | **1** | 1 | 12 | Ret | **1** | 1 | 89 |
| 6 | (United Kingdom) Johnny Herbert | 10 | Ret | | | 4 | 2 | 3 | 9 | 5 | 3 | Ret | 5 | 69 |
| 7 | (Italy) Stefano Gabellini | 6 | 6 | 9 | 6 | Ret | 5 | 17 | 5 | Ret | 4 | 5 | 7 | 58 |
| 8 | (Italy) Michela Cerruti | 2 | 1 | 12 | 14 | 11 | Ret | 4 | 7 | 11 | Ret | 8 | 9 | 54 |
| 9 | (Italy) Alessandro Pier Guidi | | | | | Ret | 6 | 16 | 15 | 2 | 13 | 2 | 3 | 49 |
| 10 | (Italy) Francesco Sini | 13 | 2 | 8 | 9 | 14 | 19 | 11 | 6 | 7 | 6 | 9 | 11 | 38 |
| 11 | (Italy) Riccardo Romagnoli | 8 | 4 | 5 | 11 | 7 | 7 | 9 | 10 | 8 | 8 | Ret | Ret | 38 |
| 12 | (Italy) Luca Rangoni | | | | | 5 | 1 | | | Ret | 15 | | | 28 |
| 13 | (Italy) Gianni Morbidelli | | | | | DNS | DNS | 15 | Ret | Ret | 9 | Ret | 2 | 18 |
| 14 | (San Marino) Christian Montanari | DNS | DNS | 6 | 3 | Ret | Ret | | | | | 19 | | 18 |
| 15 | (Switzerland) Andrea Chiesa | | 3 | | | | | | | | | | | 12 |
| 16 | (Italy) Riccardo Bossi | Ret | Ret | 16 | 4 | Ret | Ret | | | 15 | Ret | 12 | Ret | 10 |
| 17 | (Italy) Andrea Dromedari | 16 | 13 | Ret | 12 | 8 | 8 | 13 | 8 | 13 | Ret | 10 | Ret | 10 |
| 18 | (Italy) Ivan Tramontozzi | | | Ret | 5 | | | | | | | | | 8 |
| 19 | (Italy) Roberto Benedetti | 9 | 9 | Ret | 10 | Ret | 14 | 18 | 12 | 14 | 10 | 17 | 20 | 6 |
| 20 | (Italy) Fabrizio Armetta | 7 | 12 | | | 10 | Ret | | | | | 18 | 12 | 5 |
| 21 | (Italy) Alex De Giacomi | 17 | Ret | 10 | 8 | Ret | 10 | | | | | | | 5 |
| 22 | (Italy) Sandro Bettini | Ret | 7 | | | 18 | 15 | 12 | 14 | Ret | 14 | | 16 | 4 |
| 23 | (Italy) Kristian Ghedina | DNS | DNS | 7 | Ret | | | | | | | | | 4 |
| 24 | (Italy) Alessandro Garofano | | | | | Ret | Ret | 8 | Ret | | | | | 3 |
| 25 | (Italy) Mauro Cesari | | | Ret | Ret | 12 | 9 | DNS | DNS | Ret | DNS | 11 | 14 | 2 |
| 26 | (Italy) Felice Tedeschi | | | | | | | | | 9 | 16 | | | 2 |
| 27 | (Spain) Sergio Hernández | Ret | Ret | | | 9 | Ret | | | | | | | 2 |
| 28 | (Italy) Luigi Cecchi | 11 | Ret | Ret | Ret | 15 | Ret | 10 | Ret | Ret | DNS | 14 | 15 | 1 |
| 29 | (Italy) Leonardo Baccarelli | | | 15 | 18 | 19 | 16 | Ret | DNS | 10 | 11 | 16 | 17 | 1 |
| 30 | (Italy) Ermanno Dionisio | Ret | Ret | 11 | 17 | 20 | 12 | | | | | | | 1 |
| 31 | (Italy) Francesca Linossi | Ret | Ret | 13 | 13 | 13 | 11 | | | | | | | 0 |
| 32 | (Italy) Francesco Ascani | DNS | DNS | 14 | 15 | 16 | Ret | 14 | 11 | Ret | Ret | 15 | 18 | 0 |
| 33 | (Italy) Roberto Papini | 12 | Ret | | | | | | | | | 13 | 13 | 0 |
| 34 | (Italy) Alberto Cola | | | | | | | | | Ret | 12 | DNS | DNS | 0 |
| 35 | (Italy) Alessandro Tambussi | | | | | | | | 13 | | | | | 0 |
| 36 | (San Marino) Nico Caldarola | Ret | 14 | Ret | 16 | DNS | DNS | | | | | | | 0 |
| 37 | (Russia) Alessandro Vita Kouzkin | 15 | Ret | | | | | | | | | | | 0 |
| 38 | (Italy) Niccolò Mercatali | | | | | 17 | 17 | | | | | Ret | | 0 |
| 39 | (Italy) Marco Cassarà | | | | | | | | | | | | 19 | 0 |
| 40 | (Italy) Gianluca de Lorenzi | | | | | | | | | Ret | Ret | 20 | DNS | 0 |
| | (Spain) Isaac Tutumlu | Ret | Ret | | | | | | | | | | | 0 |
| | (Italy) Gianpiero Pindari | | | | | | | Ret | | | | | | 0 |
| | (Italy) Diego Romanini | | | | | DNS | DNS | | | | | | | 0 |
| | (Germany) Thomas Schöffler | | | | | DNS | DNS | | | | | | | 0 |
| Pos | Driver | MNZ (Italy) | | MIS (Italy) | | MIS (Italy) | | SPA (Belgium) | | MUG (Italy) | | VAL (Italy) | | Pts |

| Colour | Result |
|---|---|
| Gold | Winner |
| Silver | Second place |
| Bronze | Third place |
| Green | Points classification |
| Blue | Non-points classification |
| Blue | Non-classified finish (NC) |
| Purple | Retired, not classified (Ret) |
| Red | Did not qualify (DNQ) |
| Red | Did not pre-qualify (DNPQ) |
| Black | Disqualified (DSQ) |
| White | Did not start (DNS) |
| White | Withdrew (WD) |
| White | Race cancelled (C) |
| Blank | Did not practice (DNP) |
| Blank | Did not arrive (DNA) |
| Blank | Excluded (EX) |

**Bold** – Pole
Italics – Fastest Lap

=== International Superstars Series – Drivers ===
| Pos | Driver | MNZ (Italy) | | VNC (Spain) | | ALG (Portugal) | | DON (United Kingdom) | | MIS (Italy) | | SPA (Belgium) | | MUG (Italy) | | VAL (Italy) | | Pts |
|---|---|---|---|---|---|---|---|---|---|---|---|---|---|---|---|---|---|---|
| 1 | (Italy) Andrea Bertolini | 14 | | **1** | 2 | 4 | Ret | 1 | 1 | 6 | 13 | **1** | 1 | 12 | Ret | **1** | 1 | 178 |
| 2 | (Italy) Luigi Ferrara | 3 | 10 | 2 | 1 | 5 | 5 | 4 | 2 | 2 | 4 | 2 | 3 | 6 | 7 | 6 | 8 | 165 |
| 3 | (Italy) Alberto Cerqui | 5 | 5 | 12 | 10 | **2** | 2 | **3** | 7 | **1** | 3 | 7 | Ret | **1** | 1 | 3 | 6 | 163 |
| 4 | (Italy) Thomas Biagi | 4 | 8 | 3 | 4 | 1 | 1 | 7 | 9 | 3 | 18 | 6 | 4 | 4 | 2 | 4 | 10 | 147 |
| 5 | (Italy) Max Pigoli | **1** | 11 | 4 | 3 | 7 | 4 | 10 | 4 | Ret | Ret | 5 | 2 | 3 | 5 | 7 | 4 | 125 |
| 6 | (United Kingdom) Johnny Herbert | 10 | Ret | 6 | 18 | 15 | 18 | 2 | 6 | 4 | 2 | 3 | 9 | 5 | 3 | Ret | 5 | 96 |
| 7 | (Italy) Stefano Gabellini | 6 | 6 | 5 | 5 | 3 | 3 | 11 | 10 | Ret | 5 | 17 | 5 | Ret | 4 | 5 | 7 | 91 |
| 8 | (Italy) Alessandro Pier Guidi | | | | | | | 6 | 3 | Ret | 6 | 16 | 15 | 2 | 13 | 2 | 3 | 67 |
| 9 | (Italy) Michela Cerruti | 2 | 1 | Ret | 9 | 8 | Ret | 12 | 13 | 11 | Ret | 4 | 7 | 11 | Ret | 8 | 9 | 59 |
| 10 | (Italy) Francesco Sini | 13 | 2 | 15 | 7 | Ret | Ret | 8 | 17 | 14 | 19 | 11 | 6 | 7 | 6 | 9 | 11 | 40 |
| 11 | (Italy) Riccardo Romagnoli | 8 | 4 | Ret | 8 | 10 | 7 | Ret | 11 | 7 | 7 | 9 | 10 | 8 | 8 | Ret | Ret | 38 |
| 12 | (Italy) Luca Rangoni | | | | | | | | | 5 | 1 | | | Ret | 15 | | | 28 |
| 13 | (Switzerland) Andrea Chiesa | | 3 | | | 9 | 6 | | | | | | | | | | | 20 |
| 14 | (Italy) Fabrizio Armetta | 7 | 12 | 7 | 20 | 6 | 13 | 9 | 8 | 10 | Ret | | | | | 18 | 12 | 20 |
| 15 | (Italy) Gianni Morbidelli | | | | | | | | | DNS | DNS | 15 | Ret | Ret | 9 | Ret | 2 | 18 |
| 16 | (San Marino) Christian Montanari | DNS | DNS | | | | | 5 | 5 | Ret | Ret | | | | | 19 | | 16 |
| 17 | (Italy) Andrea Dromedari | 16 | 13 | 11 | 11 | 13 | 8 | 14 | 15 | 8 | 8 | 13 | 8 | 13 | Ret | 10 | Ret | 13 |
| 18 | (Italy) Ermanno Dionisio | Ret | Ret | 9 | 6 | | | | | 20 | 12 | | | | | | | 8 |
| 19 | (Italy) Sandro Bettini | Ret | 7 | 16 | 14 | 12 | 10 | | | 18 | 15 | 12 | 14 | Ret | 14 | | 16 | 5 |
| 20 | (Spain) Sergio Hernández | Ret | Ret | 8 | Ret | 19 | 16 | | | 9 | Ret | | | | | | | 5 |
| 21 | (Italy) Roberto Benedetti | 9 | 9 | Ret | 13 | | | | | Ret | 14 | 18 | 12 | 14 | 10 | 17 | 20 | 5 |
| 22 | (Italy) Mauro Cesari | | | 19 | 16 | 14 | 9 | 13 | 14 | 12 | 9 | DNS | DNS | Ret | DNS | 11 | 14 | 4 |
| 23 | (Italy) Alessandro Garofano | | | | | | | | | Ret | Ret | 8 | Ret | | | | | 3 |
| 24 | (Italy) Felice Tedeschi | | | | | | | | | | | | | 9 | 16 | | | 2 |
| 25 | (Italy) Alex De Giacomi | 17 | Ret | 10 | 12 | 17 | 17 | 15 | 12 | Ret | 10 | | | | | | | 2 |
| 26 | (Italy) Luigi Cecchi | 11 | Ret | 17 | 17 | Ret | 12 | 18 | 18 | 15 | Ret | 10 | Ret | Ret | DNS | 14 | 15 | 1 |
| 27 | (Italy) Leonardo Baccarelli | | | | | | | | | 19 | 16 | Ret | DNS | 10 | 11 | 16 | 17 | 1 |
| 28 | (Italy) Francesca Linossi | Ret | Ret | 13 | 19 | 18 | 11 | | | 13 | 11 | | | | | | | 0 |
| 29 | (Italy) Francesco Ascani | DNS | DNS | | | | | 17 | 16 | 16 | Ret | 14 | 11 | Ret | Ret | 15 | 18 | 0 |
| 30 | (Spain) Isaac Tutumlu | Ret | Ret | 18 | Ret | 11 | 15 | | | | | | | | | | | 0 |
| 31 | (Italy) Roberto Papini | 12 | Ret | | | | | | | | | | | | | 13 | 13 | 0 |
| 32 | (Italy) Riccardo Bossi | Ret | Ret | Ret | Ret | | | | | Ret | Ret | | | 15 | Ret | 12 | Ret | 0 |
| 33 | (Italy) Alberto Cola | | | | | | | | | | | | | Ret | 12 | DNS | DNS | 0 |
| 34 | (Italy) Alessandro Tambussi | | | | | 16 | 14 | | | | | | 13 | | | | | 0 |
| 35 | (San Marino) Nico Caldarola | Ret | 14 | 14 | 15 | | | | | DNS | DNS | | | | | | | 0 |
| 36 | (Russia) Alessandro Vita Kouzkin | 15 | Ret | | | | | | | | | | | | | | | 0 |
| 37 | (Italy) Ivan Tramontozzi | | | | | | | 16 | DNS | | | | | | | | | 0 |
| 38 | (Italy) Niccolò Mercatali | | | | | | | | | 17 | 17 | | | | | Ret | | 0 |
| 39 | (Italy) Marco Cassarà | | | | | | | | | | | | | | | | 19 | 0 |
| 40 | (Italy) Gianluca de Lorenzi | | | | | | | | | | | | | Ret | Ret | 20 | DNS | 0 |
| | (Italy) Giampiero Pindari | | | | | | | Ret | | | | Ret | | | | | | 0 |
| | (Italy) Kristian Ghedina | DNS | DNS | | | | | | | | | | | | | | | 0 |
| | (Italy) Diego Romanini | | | | | | | | | DNS | DNS | | | | | | | 0 |
| | (Germany) Thomas Schöffler | | | | | | | | | DNS | DNS | | | | | | | 0 |
| | (Italy) Luciano Linossi | | | | | | | | DNS | | | | | | | | | 0 |
| Pos | Driver | MNZ (Italy) | | VNC (Spain) | | ALG (Portugal) | | DON (United Kingdom) | | MIS (Italy) | | SPA (Belgium) | | MUG (Italy) | | VAL (Italy) | | Pts |

| Colour | Result |
|---|---|
| Gold | Winner |
| Silver | Second place |
| Bronze | Third place |
| Green | Points classification |
| Blue | Non-points classification |
| Blue | Non-classified finish (NC) |
| Purple | Retired, not classified (Ret) |
| Red | Did not qualify (DNQ) |
| Red | Did not pre-qualify (DNPQ) |
| Black | Disqualified (DSQ) |
| White | Did not start (DNS) |
| White | Withdrew (WD) |
| White | Race cancelled (C) |
| Blank | Did not practice (DNP) |
| Blank | Did not arrive (DNA) |
| Blank | Excluded (EX) |

**Bold** – Pole
Italics – Fastest Lap

=== International Superstars Series – Teams ===
| Pos | Team | Manufacturer | Points |
|---|---|---|---|
| 1 | (Italy) Team BMW Italia | BMW | 357 |
| 2 | (Switzerland) Swiss Team | Maserati | 297 |
| 3 | (Italy) Romeo Ferraris | Mercedes-Benz | 294 |
| 4 | (Italy) CAAL Racing | Mercedes-Benz, BMW | 206 |
| 5 | (Italy) Audi Sport Italia | Audi | 42 |
| 6 | (Italy) Ferlito Motors | Jaguar | 39 |
| 7 | (Italy) Roma Racing Team | Mercedes-Benz | 32 |
| 8 | (Italy) Motorzone Race Car | Chevrolet | 20 |
| 9 | (Italy) RGA Sportmanship | BMW | 16 |
| 10 | (Italy) Movisport | BMW | 10 |
| 11 | (Spain) Campos Racing | BMW | 5 |
| 12 | (Italy) RC Motorsport | Cadillac | 5 |
| 13 | (Italy) MRT by Nocentini | Chrysler | 4 |
| 14 | (Italy) Todi Corse | BMW | 1 |
| 15 | (Italy) MN Motorsport | Lexus | 0 |
