= 2010 Superstars Series =

Touring car racing series season

Seasons
- ← 2009 2011 →

The 2010 Superstars Series season was the seventh year of the Superstars Series, an Italian-based touring car racing series, and the fourth year of the International Superstars Series. The season began at Monza on March 28, and finished at Kyalami on November 28, after 10 rounds. The season was made up of two different drivers championships, the International Superstars Series and the Campionato Italiano Superstars, both achieved by Thomas Biagi driving for BMW.

== Teams and drivers ==
Team	Car	No.	Drivers	Rounds
(Italy) Team BMW Italia	BMW M3 (E92)	1	(Italy) Gianni Morbidelli	1–9
(Italy) Team BMW Italia	BMW M3 (E92)	2	(Italy) Stefano Gabellini	1–9
(Italy) Team BMW Italia	BMW M3 (E92)	2	(Italy) Ivan Tramontozzi	10
(Italy) Team BMW Italia	BMW M3 (E92)	3	(Italy) Thomas Biagi	All
(Italy) Team BMW Italia	BMW M3 (E92)	4	(Monaco) Luca Cappellari	All
(Italy) Motorzone Race Car	Chevrolet Lumina CR8	5	(United Kingdom) Johnny Herbert	1–2, 4–5, 8–10
(Italy) Motorzone Race Car	Chevrolet Lumina CR8	5	(Italy) Matteo Malucelli	3, 6
(Italy) Motorzone Race Car	Chevrolet Lumina CR8	10	(Italy) Nico Caldarola	1–5, 8–9
(Italy) Motorzone Race Car	Chevrolet Lumina CR8	10	(Italy) Albert Colajanni	3
(Italy) Motorzone Race Car	Chevrolet Lumina CR8	10	(South Africa) Brandon Auby	10
(Italy) Motorzone Race Car	Chevrolet Lumina CR8	15	(Italy) Filippo Zadotti	1–2, 4–6, 9
(Italy) Motorzone Race Car	Chevrolet Lumina CR8	15	(Italy) Giovanni Faraonio	3
(Italy) Motorzone Race Car	Chevrolet Lumina CR8	15	(Italy) Fabrizio Armetta	8
(Italy) Motorzone Race Car	Chevrolet Lumina CR8	15	(Italy) Federico Bonamico	10
(Italy) N.Technology	Porsche Panamera S	7	(Italy) Fabrizio Giovanardi	6, 8–9
(Italy) Movisport	BMW M3 (E90)	8	(Italy) Francesco Ascani	1–3, 5–7, 9
(Italy) Movisport	BMW M3 (E90)	69	(Italy) Kristian Ghedina	1–3, 5–7, 9
(Italy) Movisport	BMW M3 (E90)	69	(Italy) Ivan Tramontozzi	8
(Italy) Movisport	BMW 550i (E60)	99	(Italy) Mauro Cesari	1–6
(Italy) Movisport	BMW 550i (E60)	99	(Italy) Alex De Giacomi	7–9
(Italy) Romeo Ferraris	Mercedes C63 AMG	18	(Italy) Max Pigoli	All
(Italy) Romeo Ferraris	Mercedes C63 AMG	48	(Italy) Francesco Sini	6, 8–10
(Italy) Romeo Ferraris	Mercedes C63 AMG	88	(Italy) Michela Cerruti	1–3, 5–10
(Italy) RGA Sportsmanship	BMW M3 (E92)	19	(Italy) Domenico Schiattarella	1
(Italy) RGA Sportsmanship	BMW M3 (E92)	19	(San Marino) Christian Montanari	2–4, 6, 8–9
(Italy) RGA Sportsmanship	BMW M3 (E92)	70	(Italy) Giovanni Faraonio	4
(Italy) RGA Sportsmanship	BMW M3 (E92)	70	(Italy) Gianluca Calì	8
(Italy) RGA Sportsmanship	BMW M3 (E92)	70	(Italy) Roberto Papini	9
(Italy) Rangoni Motorsport	Mercedes C63 AMG	20	(Italy) Luca Rangoni	9
(Italy) Rangoni Motorsport	Mercedes C63 AMG	30	(Italy) Nicola Larini	9
(Italy) Top Run Racing	BMW M3 (E92)	21	(Italy) Roberto Russo	1–3, 6–7, 9
(Italy) MRT by Nocentini	Chrysler 300C SRT-8	22	(Italy) Mauro Cesari	7–9
(Italy) MRT by Nocentini	Chrysler 300C SRT-8	23	(Monaco) Giovanni Lavaggi	1
(Italy) MRT by Nocentini	Chrysler 300C SRT-8	23	(Italy) Matteo Cressoni	4–6
(Italy) Santucci MotorSport	Cadillac CTS-V	24	(Italy) Roberto Del Castello	1–3, 5–6, 8–9
(Italy) FR Competition	BMW 550i (E60)	28	(Italy) Diego Romanini	1–5
(Italy) FR Competition	BMW 550i (E60)	29	(Italy) Riccardo Romagnoli	1–4
(Italy) Hopmobile Audi Sport Italia	Audi RS4 (B7)	33	(Italy) Ermanno Dionisio	1
(Italy) Hopmobile Audi Sport Italia	Audi RS4 (B7)	36	(Italy) Ermanno Dionisio	2–10
(Italy) Hopmobile Audi Sport Italia	Audi RS4 (B7)	34	(Italy) Alberto Cola	1–2, 4–5, 7–10
(Italy) Hopmobile Audi Sport Italia	Audi RS4 (B7)	35	(Italy) Roberto Papini	1–2, 4
(Italy) Hopmobile Audi Sport Italia	Audi RS4 (B7)	35	(Italy) Alessandro Gabrielli	6–7, 9
(Italy) Hopmobile Audi Sport Italia	Audi RS4 (B7)	35	(Italy) Simone Campedelli	10
(Italy) Hopmobile Audi Sport Italia	Audi RS4 (B7)	37	(Portugal) Filipe Albuquerque	4
(Italy) Hopmobile Audi Sport Italia	Audi RS4 (B7)	37	(Italy) Gianluca Giraudi	9
(Italy) Hopmobile Audi Sport Italia	Audi RS4 (B7)	37	(Italy) Riccardo Bossi	10
(Italy) Vaccari Motori	BMW M3 (E92)	38	(Italy) Federico Bellini	6
(Italy) Vaccari Motori	BMW M3 (E92)	38	(Italy) Marco Bonamico	6
(Italy) Ferlito Motors	Jaguar XF SV8	40	(Italy) Matteo Cressoni	1–2
(Italy) Ferlito Motors	Jaguar XF SV8	40	(Italy) Ivan Tramontozzi	3
(Italy) Ferlito Motors	Jaguar XF SV8	40	(Italy) Luciano Linossi	7–8
(Italy) Ferlito Motors	Jaguar XF SV8	40	(Italy) Riccardo Romagnoli	9–10
(Italy) Ferlito Motors	Jaguar XF SV8	41	(Italy) Marcello Puglisi	2–3
(Italy) Ferlito Motors	Jaguar XF SV8	41	(Italy) Matteo Meneghello	5
(Italy) Ferlito Motors	Jaguar XF SV8	41	(Italy) Riccardo Romagnoli	8
(Italy) Ferlito Motors	Jaguar XF SV8	41	(Italy) Matteo Cressoni	9
(Switzerland) Swiss Team	Maserati Quattroporte	45	(Italy) Sandro Bettini	5–6, 8–9
(Switzerland) Swiss Team	Maserati Quattroporte	46	(Italy) Sandro Bettini	4
(Switzerland) Swiss Team	Maserati Quattroporte	46	(Switzerland) Andrea Chiesa	4–6, 9
(Italy) CAAL Racing	Mercedes C63 AMG	52	(Italy) Francesco Sini	1–4
(Italy) CAAL Racing	Mercedes C63 AMG	52	(Italy) David Baldi	5–7
(Italy) CAAL Racing	Mercedes C63 AMG	52	(Italy) Diego Romanini	8–10
(Italy) CAAL Racing	Mercedes C63 AMG	54	(Italy) Luigi Ferrara	All
(Italy) Todi Corse	BMW M5 (E39)	56	(Italy) Leonardo Baccarelli	1–3, 8–9
(Italy) Todi Corse	BMW M5 (E39)	56	(Italy) Guido Formilli Fendi	4
(Italy) Todi Corse	BMW M5 (E39)	58	(Italy) Marco Gregori	1–3
(Italy) Todi Corse	BMW M5 (E39)	58	(Italy) Ferdinando Geri	4
(Italy) Scuderia Giudici	BMW M5 (E39)	74	(Italy) Gianni Giudici	9

== Calendar ==
Round	Circuit/Location	Date
1	(Italy) Autodromo Nazionale Monza	March 28
2	(Italy) Autodromo Internazionale "Enzo e Dino Ferrari", Imola	April 18
3	(Italy) Autodromo Vallelunga "Piero Taruffi", Campagnano	May 9
4	(Portugal) Autódromo Internacional do Algarve, Portimão	May 23
5	(Germany) Hockenheimring	June 13
6	(Italy) Autodromo Internazionale del Mugello, Scarperia	July 25
7	(Italy) Autodromo "Riccardo Paletti", Varano de' Melegari	August 29
8	(France) Circuit "Paul Ricard" HTTT, Le Castellet	September 19
9	(Italy) Autodromo Vallelunga "Piero Taruffi", Campagnano	October 10
10	(South Africa) Kyalami Grand Prix Circuit, Midrand	November 28

International Superstars Series only
Campionato Italiano Superstars only
Both championships

== Scoring system ==
Position	1st	2nd	3rd	4th	5th	6th	7th	8th	9th	10th	Pole	Fastest Lap
Points	20	15	12	10	8	6	4	3	2	1	1	1

== Results ==
Round		Circuit	Pole position	Fastest lap	Winning driver	Winning team
1	R1	Monza	(Italy) Luigi Ferrara	(Italy) Luigi Ferrara	(Italy) Luigi Ferrara	(Italy) CAAL Racing
1	R2	Monza		(Italy) Luigi Ferrara	(Italy) Luigi Ferrara	(Italy) CAAL Racing
2	R1	Imola	(Italy) Alberto Cola	(Italy) Thomas Biagi	(Italy) Thomas Biagi	(Italy) Team BMW Italia
2	R2	Imola		(Italy) Thomas Biagi	(Italy) Max Pigoli	(Italy) Romeo Ferraris
3	R1	Vallelunga	(Italy) Gianni Morbidelli	(Italy) Gianni Morbidelli	(Italy) Gianni Morbidelli	(Italy) Team BMW Italia
3	R2	Vallelunga		(Italy) Gianni Morbidelli	(Italy) Matteo Malucelli	(Italy) Motorzone Race Car
4	R1	Algarve	(Italy) Thomas Biagi	(Italy) Alberto Cola	(Portugal) Filipe Albuquerque	(Italy) Hopmobile Audi Sport Italia
4	R2	Algarve		(Italy) Alberto Cola	(Italy) Stefano Gabellini	(Italy) Team BMW Italia
5	R1	Hockenheimring	(Italy) Max Pigoli	(Italy) Alberto Cola	(Italy) Luigi Ferrara	(Italy) CAAL Racing
5	R2	Hockenheimring		(Italy) Luigi Ferrara	(Italy) Luigi Ferrara	(Italy) CAAL Racing
6	R1	Mugello	(Italy) Fabrizio Giovanardi	(Italy) Thomas Biagi	(Italy) Fabrizio Giovanardi	(Italy) N.Technology
6	R2	Mugello		(Italy) Matteo Malucelli	(Italy) Max Pigoli	(Italy) Romeo Ferraris
7	R1	Varano	(Italy) Stefano Gabellini	(Italy) Thomas Biagi	(Italy) Thomas Biagi	(Italy) Team BMW Italia
7	R2	Varano		(Monaco) Luca Cappellari	(Monaco) Luca Cappellari	(Italy) Team BMW Italia
8	R1	Paul Ricard	(Italy) Fabrizio Giovanardi	(Italy) Fabrizio Giovanardi	(Italy) Fabrizio Giovanardi	(Italy) N.Technology
8	R2	Paul Ricard		(Italy) Fabrizio Giovanardi	(Italy) Fabrizio Giovanardi	(Italy) N.Technology
9	R1	Vallelunga	(Italy) Fabrizio Giovanardi	(Italy) Fabrizio Giovanardi	(Italy) Fabrizio Giovanardi	(Italy) N.Technology
9	R2	Vallelunga		(Italy) Luca Rangoni	(Italy) Alberto Cola	(Italy) Hopmobile Audi Sport Italia
10	R1	Kyalami	(Italy) Luigi Ferrara	(United Kingdom) Johnny Herbert	(United Kingdom) Johnny Herbert	(Italy) Motorzone Race Car
10	R2	Kyalami		(Italy) Alberto Cola	(Italy) Thomas Biagi	(Italy) Team BMW Italia

== Championship standings ==
=== Campionato Italiano Superstars ===
Pos	Driver	MNZ (Italy)		IMO (Italy)		VAL (Italy)		ALG (Portugal)		MUG (Italy)		VAR (Italy)		CPR (France)		VAL (Italy)		Pts
1	(Italy) Thomas Biagi	4	4	1	2	4	4	**2**	5	4	7	1	Ret	6	2	3	5	178
2	(Italy) Max Pigoli	2	2	4	1	5	2	16	12	5	1	3	2	14	10	5	11	147
3	(Italy) Luigi Ferrara	**1**	1	Ret	8	3	3	5	4	3	2	6	3	16	Ret	Ret	10	134
4	(Italy) Gianni Morbidelli	3	Ret	5	17	**1**	Ret	6	2	2	3	4	4	2	Ret	12	18	126
5	(Italy) Stefano Gabellini	10	Ret	20	Ret	7	5	4	1	6	4	**2**	Ret	8	**5**	4	4	106
6	(Italy) Fabrizio Giovanardi									**1**	9			**1**	1	**1**	3	100
7	(Italy) Alberto Cola	Ret	DNS	**3**	3			12	3			DNS	DNS	4	18	8	**1**	72
8	(Monaco) Luca Cappellari	7	7	10	7	6	8	Ret	7	8	**6**	5	1	11	9	10	9	69
9	(Italy) Francesco Sini	Ret	10	11	5	13	9	8	**9**	16	13			DSQ	3	6	2	49
10	(Italy) Matteo Malucelli					2	1			13	8							39
11	(United Kingdom) Johnny Herbert	Ret	6	2	DNS			DNS	Ret					3	15	Ret	Ret	33
12	(Italy) Kristian Ghedina	Ret	11	17	10	10	7			7	5	7	Ret			7	6	32
13	(Italy) Roberto Del Castello	6	3	6	15	12	Ret			9	Ret			10	7	15	Ret	31
14	(Italy) Roberto Papini	8	**5**	7	Ret			17	6							18	12	21
15	(Portugal) Filipe Albuquerque							1	Ret									20
16	(San Marino) Christian Montanari			Ret	11	Ret	6	3	13	Ret	Ret			17	16	Ret	19	18
17	(Italy) Nico Caldarola	13	Ret	12	6	14		7	Ret					9	6	17	Ret	18
18	(Italy) Luca Rangoni															2	Ret	16
19	(Italy) Filippo Zadotti	16	8	8	**Ret**			15	8	DNS	DNS					9	7	15
20	(Italy) Ivan Tramontozzi					19	DNS							7	4			14
21	(Italy) Ermanno Dionisio	15	Ret	Ret	Ret	8	**Ret**	Ret	Ret	11	Ret	8	**5**	Ret	11	14	Ret	14
22	(Italy) Matteo Cressoni	18	Ret	9	4			Ret	14	Ret	Ret					13	17	12
23	(Italy) Roberto Russo	5	9	Ret	DNS	9	Ret			DNS	DNS	Ret	DNS			16	DNS	12
24	(Italy) Diego Romanini	Ret	Ret	14	12	Ret	11	9	11					5	12	Ret	Ret	10
25	(Italy) Riccardo Romagnoli	14	Ret	13	9	11	10	10	16					Ret	8	Ret	Ret	7
26	(Italy) Luciano Linossi											11	6	19	17			6
27	(Italy) Michela Cerruti	12	12	16	13	15	15			10	Ret	Ret	7	Ret	DNS	22	13	5
28	(Italy) Alessandro Gabrielli									Ret	DNS	9	8			20	14	5
29	(Italy) Gianluca Giraudi															11	8	3
30	(Italy) Mauro Cesari	17	Ret	15	Ret	Ret	DNS	11	10	15	Ret	Ret	9	Ret	DNS	Ret	DNS	3
31	(Italy) Domenico Schiattarella	9	Ret															2
32	(Italy) Sandro Bettini								15	12	10			Ret	DNS	21	Ret	1
33	(Italy) Alex De Giacomi											10	Ret	12	DNS	Ret	15	1
34	(Monaco) Giovanni Lavaggi	11	Ret															0
35	(Italy) Marco Bonamico										11							0
36	(Italy) Francesco Ascani	Ret	13	Ret	Ret	16	12			17	12	Ret	Ret			23	Ret	0
37	(Italy) Leonardo Baccarelli	Ret	DNS	18	14	18	16							13	13	24	16	0
38	(Italy) Marcello Puglisi			Ret	Ret	Ret	13											0
39	(Italy) Guido Formilli Fendi							13	DNS									0
40	(Italy) Gianluca Calì													15	14			0
41	(Italy) Marco Gregori	Ret	Ret	19	16	17	14											0
42	(Switzerland) Andrea Chiesa							Ret		14	Ret					19	20	0
43	(Italy) Ferdinando Geri							14	Ret									0
44	(Italy) Fabrizio Armetta													18	DNS			0
45	(Italy) Federico Bellini									18								0
	(Italy) David Baldi									Ret	Ret	Ret	DNS					0
	(Italy) Giovanni Faraonio					Ret	DNS	Ret	DNS									0
	(Italy) Nicola Larini															Ret	DNS	0
	(Italy) Albert Colajanni						Ret											0
	(Italy) Gianni Giudici															DNS	DNS	0
Pos	Driver	MNZ (Italy)		IMO (Italy)		VAL (Italy)		ALG (Portugal)		MUG (Italy)		VAR (Italy)		CPR (France)		VAL (Italy)		Pts

Colour	Result
Gold	Winner
Silver	Second place
Bronze	Third place
Green	Points classification
Blue	Non-points classification
Blue	Non-classified finish (NC)
Purple	Retired, not classified (Ret)
Red	Did not qualify (DNQ)
Red	Did not pre-qualify (DNPQ)
Black	Disqualified (DSQ)
White	Did not start (DNS)
White	Withdrew (WD)
White	Race cancelled (C)
Blank	Did not practice (DNP)
Blank	Did not arrive (DNA)
Blank	Excluded (EX)

**Bold** – Pole
Italics – Fastest Lap

=== International Superstars Series ===
Pos	Driver	MNZ (Italy)		IMO (Italy)		ALG (Portugal)		HOC (Germany)		CPR (France)		VAL (Italy)		KYA (South Africa)		Pts
1	(Italy) Thomas Biagi	4	4	1	2	**2**	5	2	4	6	2	3	5	8	**1**	170
2	(Italy) Luigi Ferrara	**1**	1	Ret	8	5	4	1	1	16	Ret	Ret	10	**2**	4	132
3	(Italy) Max Pigoli	2	2	4	1	16	12	**3**	2	14	10	5	11	6	3	115
4	(Italy) Alberto Cola	Ret	DNS	**3**	3	12	3	5	7	4	18	8	**1**	5	2	109
5	(Italy) Fabrizio Giovanardi									**1**	1	**1**	3			77
6	(Italy) Gianni Morbidelli	3	Ret	5	17	6	2	4	5	2	Ret	12	18			74
7	(United Kingdom) Johnny Herbert	Ret	6	2	DNS	DNS	Ret	14	3	3	15	Ret	Ret	1	Ret	66
8	(Italy) Francesco Sini	Ret	10	11	5	8	**9**			DSQ	3	6	2	4	6	63
9	(Italy) Stefano Gabellini	10	Ret	20	Ret	4	1	Ret	Ret	8	**5**	4	4			62
10	(Monaco) Luca Cappellari	7	7	10	7	Ret	7	6	6	11	9	10	9	Ret	5	42
11	(Italy) Roberto Del Castello	6	3	6	15			7	Ret	10	7	15	Ret			33
12	(Italy) Roberto Papini	8	**5**	7	Ret	17	6					18	12			21
13	(Portugal) Filipe Albuquerque					1	Ret									20
14	(Italy) Nico Caldarola	13	Ret	12	6	7	Ret	11	Ret	9	6	17	Ret			18
15	(Italy) Filippo Zadotti	16	8	8	**Ret**	15	8	Ret	8			9	7			18
16	(Italy) Luca Rangoni											2	Ret			16
17	(Italy) Matteo Cressoni	18	Ret	9	4	Ret	14	8	**14**			13	17			15
18	(Italy) Ivan Tramontozzi									7	4			13	Ret	14
19	(Italy) Kristian Ghedina	Ret	11	17	10			10	9			7	6			14
20	(San Marino) Christian Montanari			Ret	11	3	13			17	16	Ret	19			12
21	(Italy) Ermanno Dionisio	15	Ret	Ret	Ret	Ret	Ret	Ret	Ret	Ret	11	14	Ret	3	Ret	12
22	(Italy) Diego Romanini	Ret	Ret	14	12	9	11	16	15	5	12	Ret	Ret	11	Ret	10
23	(Italy) Roberto Russo	5	9	Ret	DNS							16	DNS			10
24	(Italy) Riccardo Romagnoli	14	Ret	13	9	10	16			Ret	8	Ret	Ret	7	Ret	10
25	(Italy) Federico Bonamico													12	7	4
26	(Italy) Gianluca Giraudi											11	8			3
27	(Italy) Mauro Cesari	17	Ret	15	Ret	11	10	9	Ret	Ret	DNS	Ret	DNS			3
28	(Italy) Domenico Schiattarella	9	Ret													2
29	(Italy) Riccardo Bossi													9	Ret	2
30	(Italy) Michela Cerruti	12	12	16	13			Ret	Ret	Ret	DNS	22	13	10	Ret	1
31	(Italy) David Baldi							Ret	10							1
32	(Italy) Francesco Ascani	Ret	13	Ret	Ret			12	11			23	Ret			0
33	(Monaco) Giovanni Lavaggi	11	Ret													0
34	(Switzerland) Andrea Chiesa					Ret		13	12			19	20			0
35	(Italy) Alex De Giacomi									12	DNS	Ret	15			0
36	(Italy) Leonardo Baccarelli	Ret	DNS	18	14					13	13	24	16			0
37	(Italy) Sandro Bettini						15	15	13	Ret	DNS	21	Ret			0
38	(Italy) Guido Formilli Fendi					13	DNS									0
39	(Italy) Gianluca Calì									15	14					0
40	(Italy) Alessandro Gabrielli											20	14			0
41	(Italy) Ferdinando Geri					14	Ret									0
42	(Italy) Marco Gregori	Ret	Ret	19	16											0
43	(Italy) Luciano Linossi									19	17					0
44	(Italy) Fabrizio Armetta									18	DNS					0
	(Italy) Marcello Puglisi			Ret	Ret											0
	(Italy) Matteo Meneghello							Ret	Ret							0
	(South Africa) Brandon Auby													Ret	Ret	0
	(Italy) Simone Campedelli													Ret	Ret	0
	(Italy) Giovanni Faraonio					Ret	DNS									0
	(Italy) Nicola Larini											Ret	DNS			0
	(Italy) Gianni Giudici											DNS	DNS			0
Pos	Driver	MNZ (Italy)		IMO (Italy)		ALG (Portugal)		HOC (Germany)		CPR (France)		VAL (Italy)		KYA (South Africa)		Pts

Colour	Result
Gold	Winner
Silver	Second place
Bronze	Third place
Green	Points classification
Blue	Non-points classification
Blue	Non-classified finish (NC)
Purple	Retired, not classified (Ret)
Red	Did not qualify (DNQ)
Red	Did not pre-qualify (DNPQ)
Black	Disqualified (DSQ)
White	Did not start (DNS)
White	Withdrew (WD)
White	Race cancelled (C)
Blank	Did not practice (DNP)
Blank	Did not arrive (DNA)
Blank	Excluded (EX)

**Bold** – Pole
Italics – Fastest Lap
