= 2012 FIA WTCC Race of Brazil =

Race details
- Round 8 of 12 in the 2012 World Touring Car Championship at Autódromo Internacional de Curitiba in Pinhais, Brazil.
- Date: 22 July, 2012
- Location: Pinhais, Brazil
- Course: Autódromo Internacional de Curitiba; 3.695 kilometres (2.296 mi)

Race One
- Laps: 15
Pole position
Driver		(France) Yvan Muller	Chevrolet
Time		1:22.289	
Podium
First		(France) Yvan Muller	Chevrolet
Second		(Switzerland) Alain Menu	Chevrolet
Third		(United Kingdom) Robert Huff	Chevrolet
Fastest Lap
Driver		(France) Yvan Muller	Chevrolet
Time		1:23.920	

Race Two
- Laps: 16
Podium
First		(United Kingdom) Robert Huff	Chevrolet
Second		(Switzerland) Alain Menu	Chevrolet
Third		(Italy) Gabriele Tarquini	Lukoil Racing Team
Fastest Lap
Driver		(United Kingdom) Robert Huff	Chevrolet
Time		1:24.244	

The 2012 FIA WTCC Race of Brazil was the eighth round of the 2012 World Touring Car Championship season and the seventh running of the FIA WTCC Race of Brazil. It was held on 22 July 2012 at the Autódromo Internacional de Curitiba in Pinhais, Brazil. Both races were won by Chevrolet with Yvan Muller winning race one and Robert Huff winning race two.

== Background ==
In the break prior to the event, Chevrolet announced they were pulling out of the World Touring Car Championship at the end of the season. This would leave Muller, Huff and Alain Menu without drives for the 2013 season. It was Yvan Muller who was leading the championship coming into Brazil on 245 points ahead of Huff and Menu. Pepe Oriola was leading the Yokohama Independents' Trophy.

In the weeks prior to Brazil, Honda also announced their 2013 driver lineup. Gabriele Tarquini and Tiago Monteiro would join the works team for the following season, with Monteiro also driving for them in the final three events of the 2012 season.

Pasquale di Sabatino, recovering from bronchitis and pneumonia was ruled out of competing by doctors. Michel Nykjær substituted for the Italian driver at bamboo-engineering for the weekend.

== Report ==
=== Free Practice ===
Muller led a Chevrolet 1–2–3 in free practice one with Tarquini in fourth ahead of the bamboo-engineering Chevrolet duo of Michel Nykjær and Alex MacDowall.

Muller topped the times once again in the second free practice session ahead of both his Chevrolet teammates. Behind them it was the future Honda duo of Tarquini and Monteiro in front of the bamboo-engineering drivers.

=== Qualifying ===
After leading both free practice sessions, Muller took his third pole position of the season with Menu second and Huff third. Nykjær lined up fourth on his return to the WTCC with Tarquini the leading non-Chevrolet driver in fifth. Norbert Michelisz finished 10th in Q2 to take the reversed grid pole position for race two.

=== Warm-Up ===
Muller led a Chevrolet 1–2–3–4 in Sunday morning's warm-up session with Tarquini the fastest non-Chevrolet car.

=== Race One ===
The three Chevrolet cars led from the start and had an easy race with the exception of third placed Huff who had to defend from the SEAT of Tarquini. A coming together on the second lap forced both Monteiro and Alberto Cerqui into retirement. Tarquini finished fourth behind the works Chevrolet cars, led by Muller and ahead of the bamboo-engineering pair of Nykjær and MacDowall. Nykjær celebrated his return to the WTCC as the winning independent driver. Michelisz finished ahead of Oriola in the independents' race which would see him close in the Yokohama Trophy title lead. A last lap coming together between Stefano D'Aste and Franz Engstler for fifteenth landed D'Aste with a 30-second penalty after the race, dropping him to seventeenth.

=== Race Two ===
Michelisz started on pole position for the second race and he held the lead until half distance when he got passed by Tarquini, Huff, Menu and Muller on the same lap. Huff and Menu were then able to overtake the Italian driver and use him as a buffer between themselves and championship leader Muller. A coming together between ROAL Motorsport's Cerqui and Lukoil Racing Team's Aleksei Dudukalo forced the BMW to crash into the pit wall and retirement. At the flag Huff and Menu formed a Chevrolet 1–2 with Tarquini third and Muller missing out on a podium in fourth. Michelisz finished fifth as the winning independent as Oriola watched on from the pits having retired from the race, his Yokohama Trophy lead lost to the Zengő Motorsport driver.

== Results ==
=== Qualifying ===
Pos.	No.	Name	Team	Car	C	Q1	Q2	Points
1	1	(France) Yvan Muller	Chevrolet	Chevrolet Cruze 1.6T		1:22.824	1:22.289	**5**
2	8	(Switzerland) Alain Menu	Chevrolet	Chevrolet Cruze 1.6T		1:22.877	1:22.444	**4**
3	2	(United Kingdom) Robert Huff	Chevrolet	Chevrolet Cruze 1.6T		1:23.473	1:22.592	**3**
4	17	(Denmark) Michel Nykjær	bamboo-engineering	Chevrolet Cruze 1.6T	Y	1:23.567	1:22.765	**2**
5	3	(Italy) Gabriele Tarquini	Lukoil Racing	SEAT León WTCC		1:23.764	1:22.947	**1**
6	11	(United Kingdom) Alex MacDowall	bamboo-engineering	Chevrolet Cruze 1.6T	Y	1:22.726	1:23.086	
7	20	(China) Darryl O'Young	Special Tuning Racing	SEAT León WTCC	Y	1:23.994	1:23.366	
8	18	(Portugal) Tiago Monteiro	Tuenti Racing	SR León 1.6T		1:24.212	1:23.500	
9	15	(Netherlands) Tom Coronel	ROAL Motorsport	BMW 320 TC		1:23.736	1:23.516	
10	5	(Hungary) **Norbert Michelisz**	Zengő Motorsport	BMW 320 TC	Y	1:23.984	1:23.622	
11	4	(Russia) Aleksei Dudukalo	Lukoil Racing	SEAT León WTCC	Y	1:24.065	1:23.630	
12	25	(Morocco) Mehdi Bennani	Proteam Racing	BMW 320 TC	Y	1:24.271	1:23.927	
13	16	(Italy) Alberto Cerqui	ROAL Motorsport	BMW 320 TC	Y	1:24.293		
14	74	(Spain) Pepe Oriola	Tuenti Racing	SEAT León WTCC	Y	1:24.360		
15	7	(Hong Kong) Charles Ng	Liqui Moly Team Engstler	BMW 320 TC	Y	1:24.528		
16	22	(United Kingdom) Tom Boardman	Special Tuning Racing	SEAT León WTCC	Y	1:24.601		
17	6	(Germany) Franz Engstler	Liqui Moly Team Engstler	BMW 320 TC	Y	1:24.652		
18	88	(Spain) Fernando Monje	Tuenti Racing	SEAT León WTCC	Y	1:24.700		
19	14	(United Kingdom) James Nash	Team Aon	Ford Focus S2000 TC		1:24.902		
20	23	(United Kingdom) Tom Chilton	Team Aon	Ford Focus S2000 TC		1:24.986		
21	26	(Italy) Stefano D'Aste	Wiechers-Sport	BMW 320 TC	Y	1:25.121		

- **Bold** denotes Pole position for second race.

=== Race 1 ===
Pos.	No.	Name	Team	Car	C	Laps	Time/Retired	Grid	Points
1	1	(France) **Yvan Muller**	Chevrolet	Chevrolet Cruze 1.6T		15	22:05.549	1	25
2	8	(Switzerland) Alain Menu	Chevrolet	Chevrolet Cruze 1.6T		15	+0.398	2	18
3	2	(United Kingdom) Robert Huff	Chevrolet	Chevrolet Cruze 1.6T		15	+0.933	3	15
4	3	(Italy) Gabriele Tarquini	Lukoil Racing	SEAT León WTCC		15	+2.767	5	12
5	17	(Denmark) Michel Nykjær	bamboo-engineering	Chevrolet Cruze 1.6T	Y	15	+5.656	4	10
6	11	(United Kingdom) Alex MacDowall	bamboo-engineering	Chevrolet Cruze 1.6T	Y	15	+6.639	6	8
7	20	(China) Darryl O'Young	Special Tuning Racing	SEAT León WTCC	Y	15	+13.850	7	6
8	15	(Netherlands) Tom Coronel	ROAL Motorsport	BMW 320 TC		15	+15.552	9	4
9	5	(Hungary) Norbert Michelisz	Zengő Motorsport	BMW 320 TC	Y	15	+15.721	10	2
10	88	(Spain) Fernando Monje	Tuenti Racing	SEAT León WTCC	Y	15	+19.896	18	1
11	4	(Russia) Aleksei Dudukalo	Lukoil Racing	SEAT León WTCC	Y	15	+20.552	11	
12	25	(Morocco) Mehdi Bennani	Proteam Racing	BMW 320 TC	Y	15	+29.405	12	
13	7	(Hong Kong) Charles Ng	Liqui Moly Team Engstler	BMW 320 TC	Y	15	+31.621	15	
14	14	(United Kingdom) James Nash	Team Aon	Ford Focus S2000 TC		15	+35.093	19	
15	6	(Germany) Franz Engstler	Liqui Moly Team Engstler	BMW 320 TC	Y	15	+38.976	17	
16	74	(Spain) Pepe Oriola	Tuenti Racing	SEAT León WTCC	Y	15	+46.613	14	
17	26	(Italy) Stefano D'Aste	Wiechers-Sport	BMW 320 TC	Y	15	+1:01.675	21	
18	23	(United Kingdom) Tom Chilton	Team Aon	Ford Focus S2000 TC		15	+1:05.411	20	
19	22	(United Kingdom) Tom Boardman	Special Tuning Racing	SEAT León WTCC	Y	13	+2 Laps	16	
NC	16	(Italy) Alberto Cerqui	ROAL Motorsport	BMW 320 TC	Y	9	+6 Laps	13	
Ret	18	(Portugal) Tiago Monteiro	Tuenti Racing	SR León 1.6T		1	Collision	8	

- **Bold** denotes Fastest lap.

=== Race 2 ===
Pos.	No.	Name	Team	Car	C	Laps	Time/Retired	Grid	Points
1	2	(United Kingdom) **Robert Huff**	Chevrolet	Chevrolet Cruze 1.6T		16	23:49.750	8	25
2	8	(Switzerland) Alain Menu	Chevrolet	Chevrolet Cruze 1.6T		16	+1.099	9	18
3	3	(Italy) Gabriele Tarquini	Lukoil Racing	SEAT León WTCC		16	+1.496	6	15
4	1	(France) Yvan Muller	Chevrolet	Chevrolet Cruze 1.6T		16	+1.758	10	12
5	5	(Hungary) Norbert Michelisz	Zengő Motorsport	BMW 320 TC	Y	16	+4.958	1	10
6	17	(Denmark) Michel Nykjær	bamboo-engineering	Chevrolet Cruze 1.6T	Y	16	+12.849	7	8
7	15	(Netherlands) Tom Coronel	ROAL Motorsport	BMW 320 TC		16	+14.072	2	6
8	25	(Morocco) Mehdi Bennani	Proteam Racing	BMW 320 TC	Y	16	+14.477	12	4
9	18	(Portugal) Tiago Monteiro	Tuenti Racing	SR León 1.6T		16	+15.506	3	2
10	4	(Russia) Aleksei Dudukalo	Lukoil Racing	SEAT León WTCC	Y	16	+16.263	11	1
11	11	(United Kingdom) Alex MacDowall	bamboo-engineering	Chevrolet Cruze 1.6T	Y	16	+16.552	5	
12	22	(United Kingdom) Tom Boardman	Special Tuning Racing	SEAT León WTCC	Y	16	+19.243	16	
13	26	(Italy) Stefano D'Aste	Wiechers-Sport	BMW 320 TC	Y	16	+19.785	21	
14	88	(Spain) Fernando Monje	Tuenti Racing	SEAT León WTCC	Y	16	+26.411	18	
15	14	(United Kingdom) James Nash	Team Aon	Ford Focus S2000 TC		16	+30.662	19	
16	23	(United Kingdom) Tom Chilton	Team Aon	Ford Focus S2000 TC		15	+1 Lap	20	
17	74	(Spain) Pepe Oriola	Tuenti Racing	SEAT León WTCC	Y	13	+3 Laps	14	
Ret	16	(Italy) Alberto Cerqui	ROAL Motorsport	BMW 320 TC	Y	8	Collision	13	
Ret	20	(China) Darryl O'Young	Special Tuning Racing	SEAT León WTCC	Y	4	Gearbox	4	
Ret	7	(Hong Kong) Charles Ng	Liqui Moly Team Engstler	BMW 320 TC	Y	2	Collision	15	
Ret	6	(Germany) Franz Engstler	Liqui Moly Team Engstler	BMW 320 TC	Y	1	Mechanical	17	

- **Bold** denotes Fastest lap.

== Standings after the round ==
Drivers' Championship standings

	Pos	Driver	Points
	1	(France) Yvan Muller	287
	2	(United Kingdom) Robert Huff	270
	3	(Switzerland) Alain Menu	250
1	4	(Italy) Gabriele Tarquini	162
1	5	(Netherlands) Tom Coronel	150

Yokohama Independents' Trophy standings

	Pos	Driver	Points
1	1	(Hungary) Norbert Michelisz	111
1	2	(Spain) Pepe Oriola	106
	3	(Italy) Stefano D'Aste	75
1	4	(United Kingdom) Alex MacDowall	63
1	5	(Germany) Franz Engstler	58

Manufacturers' Championship standings

Pos	Manufacturer	Points
1	(United States) Chevrolet	673
2	(Germany) BMW Customer Racing Teams	430
3	(Spain) SEAT Racing Technology	425

- Note: Only the top five positions are included for both sets of drivers' standings.
