= Christian Montanari =

Sammarinese racing driver

- Nationality: Sammarinese
- Born: 21 June 1981 (age 45) San Marino

Previous series
- 2012 2009–2011, 2013 2007–2008 2005–2006 2004 2003 2002: Italian GT Championship; Superstars Series; FIA GT Championship; Formula Renault 3.5 Series; Formula Renault V6 Eurocup; Italian F3 Championship; Formula Renault 2.0 Italy

Christian Montanari (born 21 June 1981) is a Sammarinese former racing car driver.

== Results summary ==
=== Career summary ===
Season	Series	Team	Races	Wins	Poles	F.Laps	Podiums	Points	Position
2002	Euro Formula 3000	GP Racing	1	0	0	0	0	1	13th
2002	Formula Renault 2000 Eurocup	Drumel Motorsport	5	0	0	0	0	10	22nd
2002	Formula Renault 2.0 Italia	Drumel Motorsport	10	0	0	0	2	82	6th
2003	FIA International Formula 3000	Coloni Motorsport	1	0	0	0	0	0	NC
2003	Italian Formula Three Championship	Coloni Motorsport	9	3	2	2	5	98	**2nd**
2004	Formula 3 Euro Series	Coloni Motorsport	4	0	0	0	0	0	NC
2004	Formula Renault V6 Eurocup	Victory Engineering	12	2	1	0	4	122	10th
2005	Formula Renault 3.5 Series	Draco Multiracing USA	16	1	1	0	2	54	8th
2006	Formula Renault 3.5 Series	Prema Powerteam	17	1	2	1	2	58	7th
2007	FIA GT Championship - GT1	Vitaphone Racing	10	1	0	1	4	54	4th
2007	Rolex Sports Car Series - DP	SAMAX	1	0	0	0	0	25	60th
2008	FIA GT Championship - GT2	AF Corse	10	0	0	0	4	45	4th
2008	24 Hours of Le Mans - GT2	AF Corse	1	0	0	0	0	0	NC
2008	Rolex Sports Car Series - GT	Mastercar	1	0	0	0	0	0	NC
2009	Le Mans Series - GT2	Team Farnbacher	2	0	0	0	1	10	13th
2009	24 Hours of Le Mans - GT2	Team Farnbacher	1	0	0	0	0	0	NC
2009	Rolex Sports Car Series - GT	Mastercar	1	0	0	0	0	6	78th
2009	Superstars Series	Habitat Racing	2	0	0	0	2	27	12th
2010	Superstars Series	Habitat Racing	10	0	0	0	1	12	20th
2010	Italian Touring Endurance Championship	W&D Racing Team	2	1	0	1	1	19	12th
2011	Superstars Series	RGA Sportsmanship	5	0	0	0	1	18	13th
2011	Superstars International Series	RGA Sportsmanship	5	0	0	0	0	16	16th
2012	Italian GT Championship	Audi Sport Italia	4	1	0	0	2	38	16th
2013	Superstars Series	CAAL Racing	1	0	0	0	0	1	34th

=== Complete Formula Renault 3.5 Series results ===
(key) (Races in bold indicate pole position) (Races in italics indicate fastest lap)

Year	Entrant	1	2	3	4	5	6	7	8	9	10	11	12	13	14	15	16	17	DC	Points
2005	Draco Multiracing USA	ZOL; 1; 7	ZOL; 2 DNS	**MON**; **1**; 1	VAL; 1; 12	VAL; 2; 15†	LMS; 1; 12	LMS; 2; 6	BIL; 1; 6	BIL; 2; 10	OSC; 1; 11	OSC; 2; 17†	DON; 1; 2	DON; 2; 15	EST; 1; 8	EST; 2; 5	MNZ; 1; 12	MNZ; 2; 9	8th	54
2006	Prema Powerteam	**ZOL**; **1**; 2	ZOL; 2; 16	**MON**; **1** Ret	IST; 1; 9	IST; 2 Ret	MIS; 1 Ret	MIS; 2 Ret	SPA; 1; 7	SPA; 2; 21	NÜR; 1; 11	NÜR; 2; 1	DON; 1; 11	DON; 2 Ret	LMS; 1; 3	LMS; 2; 14	CAT; 1; 7	CAT; 2; 4	7th	58

=== 24 Hours of Le Mans results ===
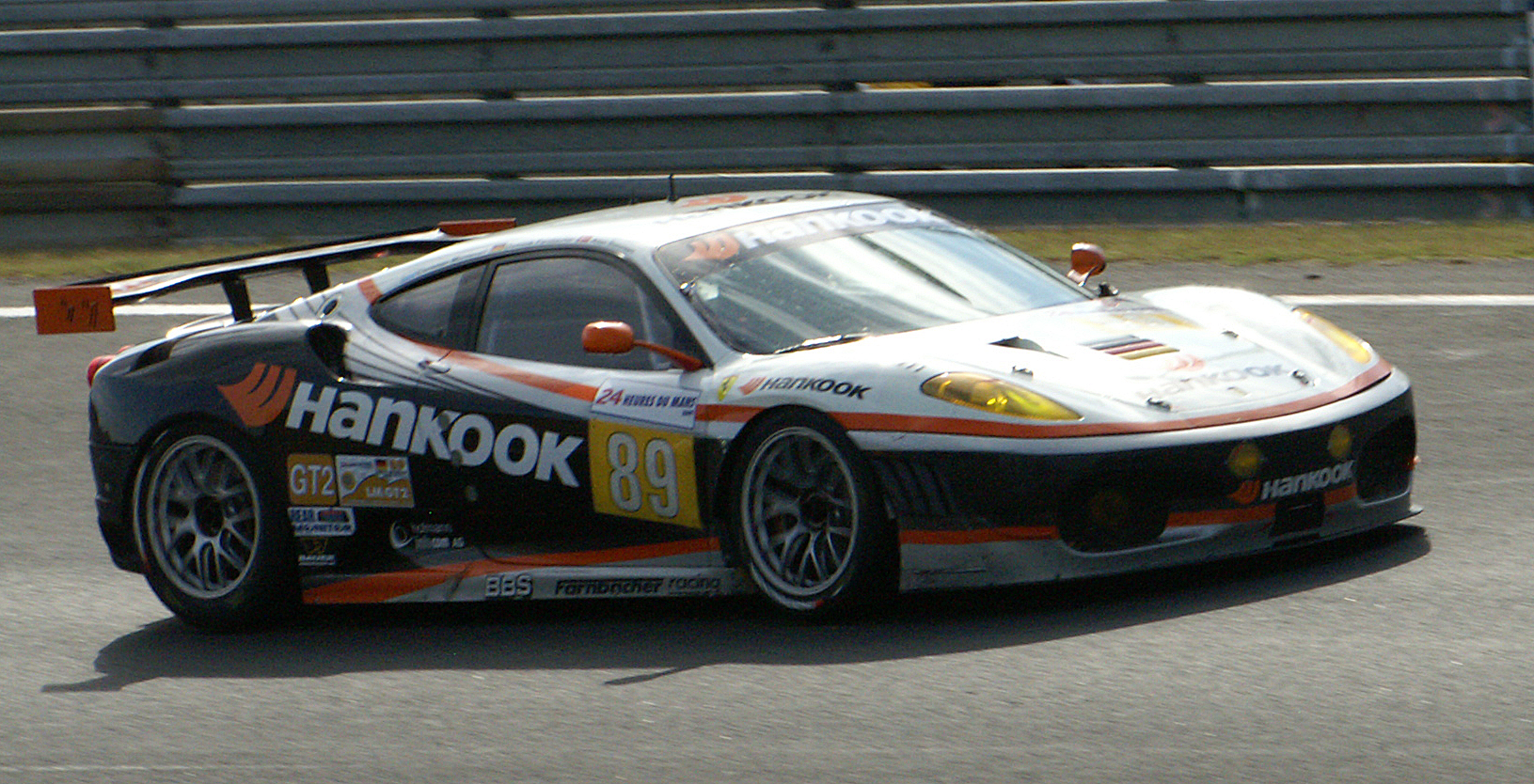
Montanari competing in the 2009 24 Hours of Le Mans.

Year	Team	Co-Drivers	Car	Class	Laps	Pos.	Class Pos.
2008	(Italy) AF Corse	(Italy) Thomas Biagi (Finland) Toni Vilander	Ferrari F430 GT2	GT2	111	DNF	DNF
2009	(Germany) Team Farnbacher	(Germany) Dominik Farnbacher (Denmark) Allan Simonsen	Ferrari F430 GT2	GT2	183	DNF	DNF
