= Alberto Cerqui =

Italian racing driver

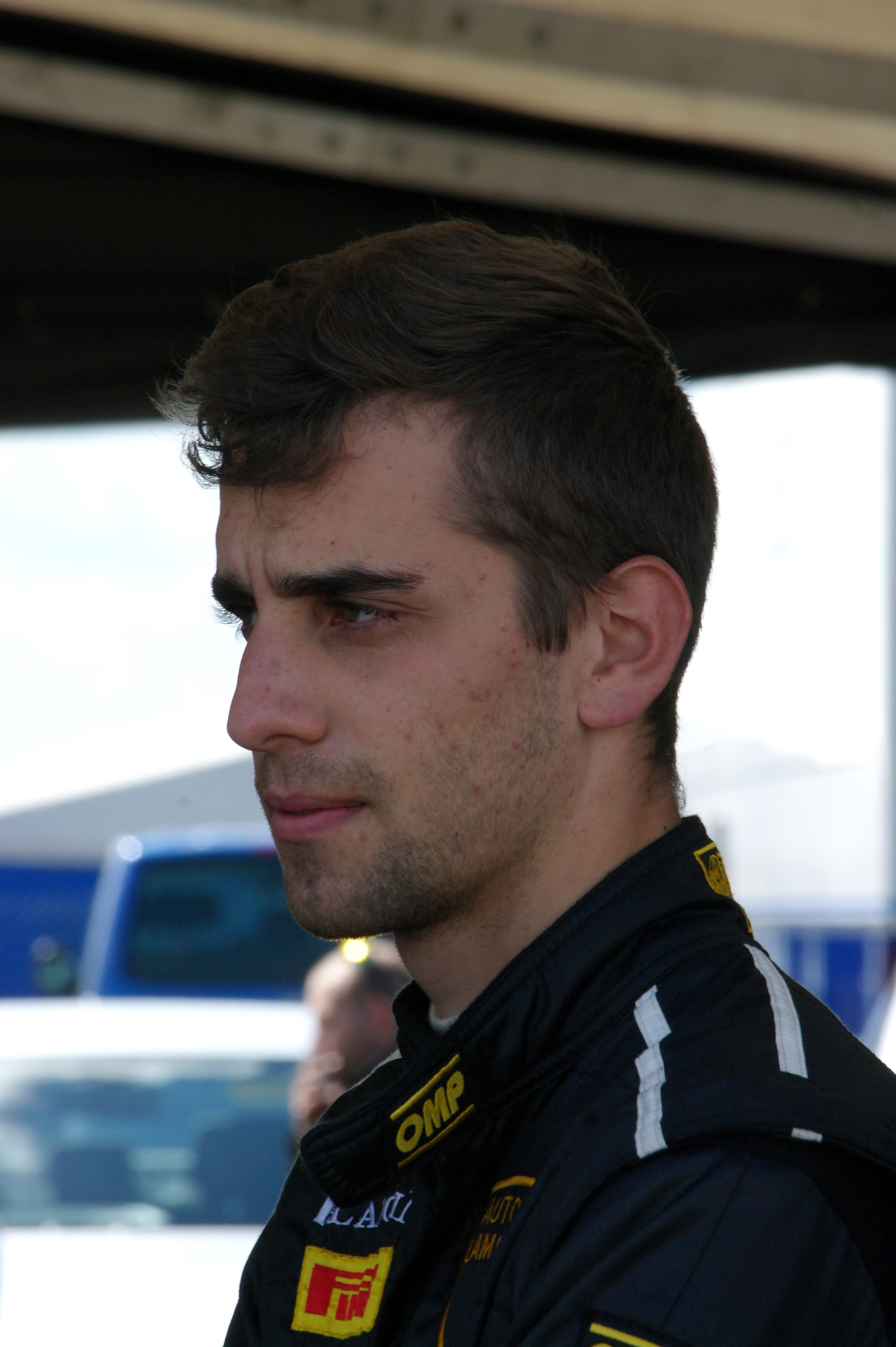
- Cerqui at the Silverstone round of the 2014 Lamborghini Super Trofeo season.
- Nationality: Italian
- Born: 20 June 1992 (age 34) Brescia, Italy

Previous series
- 2013 2012 2011 2010 2009: Porsche Carrera Cup Italy; WTCC; Superstars Series; Italian F3; Formula Azzurra

Championship titles
- 2011 2009: Campionato Italiano Superstars; Formula Azzurra

Alberto Cerqui (born 20 June 1992, in Brescia) is an Italian racing driver. He has competed in the World Touring Car Championship.

== Career ==
=== Single seaters ===
After winning titles in karting, Cerqui graduated to single-seater racing in 2009, racing in Formula Azzurra. He scored four victories, two pole positions and six podiums from 16 races on his way to the title. He graduated to the Italian Formula Three Championship in 2010, driving for Ombra Racing. He finished 19th in the final classification, scoring three points.

=== Superstars Series ===
At the end of 2010, Cerqui tested for the Team BMW Italia Superstars Series team at Adria. In January 2011 Cerqui was announced as a driver for the team. Cerqui scored three successive pole positions at Portimão, Donington Park and Misano, and took his maiden win at Misano.

=== World Touring Car Championship ===
==== ROAL Motorsport (2012) ====
Cerqui stayed with ROAL Motorsport for 2012 to race in the World Touring Car Championship as teammate to Tom Coronel. He finished in the points in both races at his home event, the season opening Race of Italy. The first race of the Race of Slovakia saw Cerqui climb from twelfth on the grid to fourth in the results. He qualified 13th for the Race of Hungary but a parc fermé infringement by his team saw both cars sent to the back of the grid with Cerqui lining up 20th and 19th for race one and race two respectively. During race two of the Race of Portugal, Yvan Muller spun and Cerqui was able to take his fifth place until Muller took it back later in the race. The Race of Brazil saw Cerqui retire twice; contact in race one with Tiago Monteiro forced him to retire on lap two, then a collision in race two with Aleksei Dudukalo saw Cerqui crash into the pit wall. Race one of the Race of United States saw him involved in a first lap pileup involving six cars, forcing Cerqui, Dudukalo and Fernando Monje to retire. In race one at the Race of Japan, Cerqui had passed the Team Aon car of James Nash but soon after spun and ended his race in the gravel trap at the first corner. After the race he was also handed a 30-second time penalty for a start infringement although having retired this did not affect his overall result. Cerqui ended his non-scoring streak at the Race of China with a pair of top-ten finishes. Cerqui sat out the final round in Macau and was replaced by Kei Cozzolino. Cerqui stated that before the season started, he agreed with his team that he would only participate in the Macau races if he were still in contention for the Yokohama Drivers' Trophy.

== Racing record ==
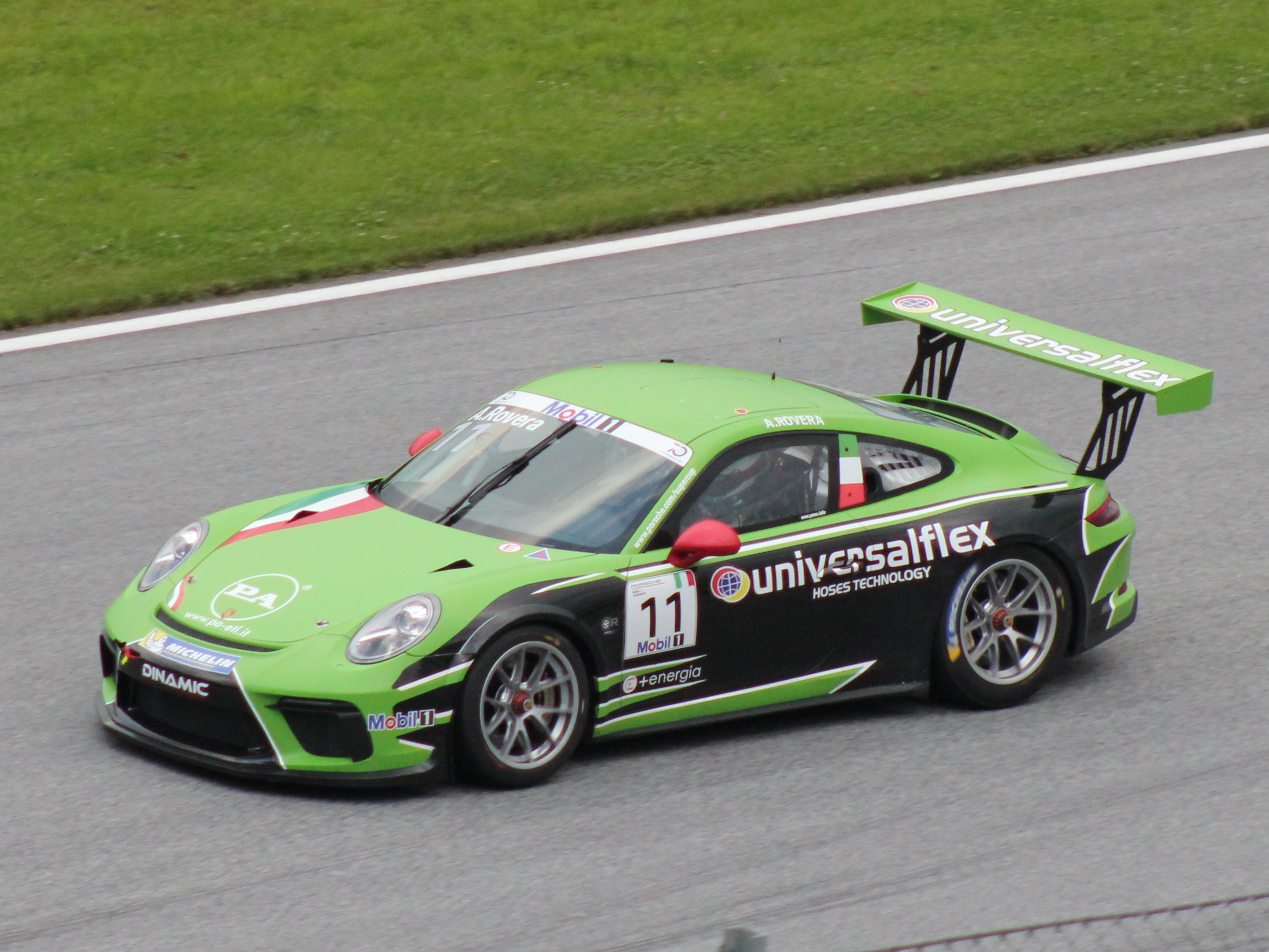
Alberto Cerqui at the Red Bull Ring in 2018

=== Complete International Superstars Series results ===
(key) (Races in bold indicate pole position) (Races in italics indicate fastest lap)

Year	Team	Car	1	2	3	4	5	6	7	8	9	10	11	12	13	14	15	16	DC	Points
2011	Team BMW Italia	BMW M3 (E92)	MNZ; R1; 5	MNZ; R2; 5	VNC; R1; 12	VNC; R2; 10	**ALG**; **R1**; 2	ALG; R2; 2	DON; R1; 3	DON; R2; 7	**MIS**; **R1**; 1	MIS; R2; 3	SPA; R1; 7	SPA; R2; Ret	**MUG**; **R1**; 1	MUG; R2; 1	VAL; R1; 3	VAL; R2; 6	**3rd**	**163**

=== Complete World Touring Car Championship results ===
(key) (Races in bold indicate pole position) (Races in italics indicate fastest lap)

Year	Team	Car	1	2	3	4	5	6	7	8	9	10	11	12	13	14	15	16	17	18	19	20	21	22	23	24	DC	Pts
2012	ROAL Motorsport	BMW 320 TC	ITA; 1; 10	ITA; 2; 9	ESP; 1; 13	ESP; 2 Ret	MAR; 1; 15	MAR; 2 Ret	SVK; 1; 4	SVK; 2; 8	HUN; 1; 13	HUN; 2; 18	AUT; 1; 13	AUT; 2; 7	POR; 1; 8	POR; 2; 6	BRA; 1 NC	BRA; 2 Ret	USA; 1 Ret	USA; 2; 13	JPN; 1 Ret	JPN; 2; 14	CHN; 1; 7	CHN; 2; 9	MAC; 1	MAC; 2	13th	45

Sporting positions
Preceded by Edoardo Liberati	Formula Azzurra champion 2009	Succeeded by Brandon Maïsano; Formula Abarth
Preceded by Thomas Biagi	Superstars Series; Italian Champion; 2011	Succeeded by Johan Kristoffersson
