= HSV ClubSport =

Australian performance car

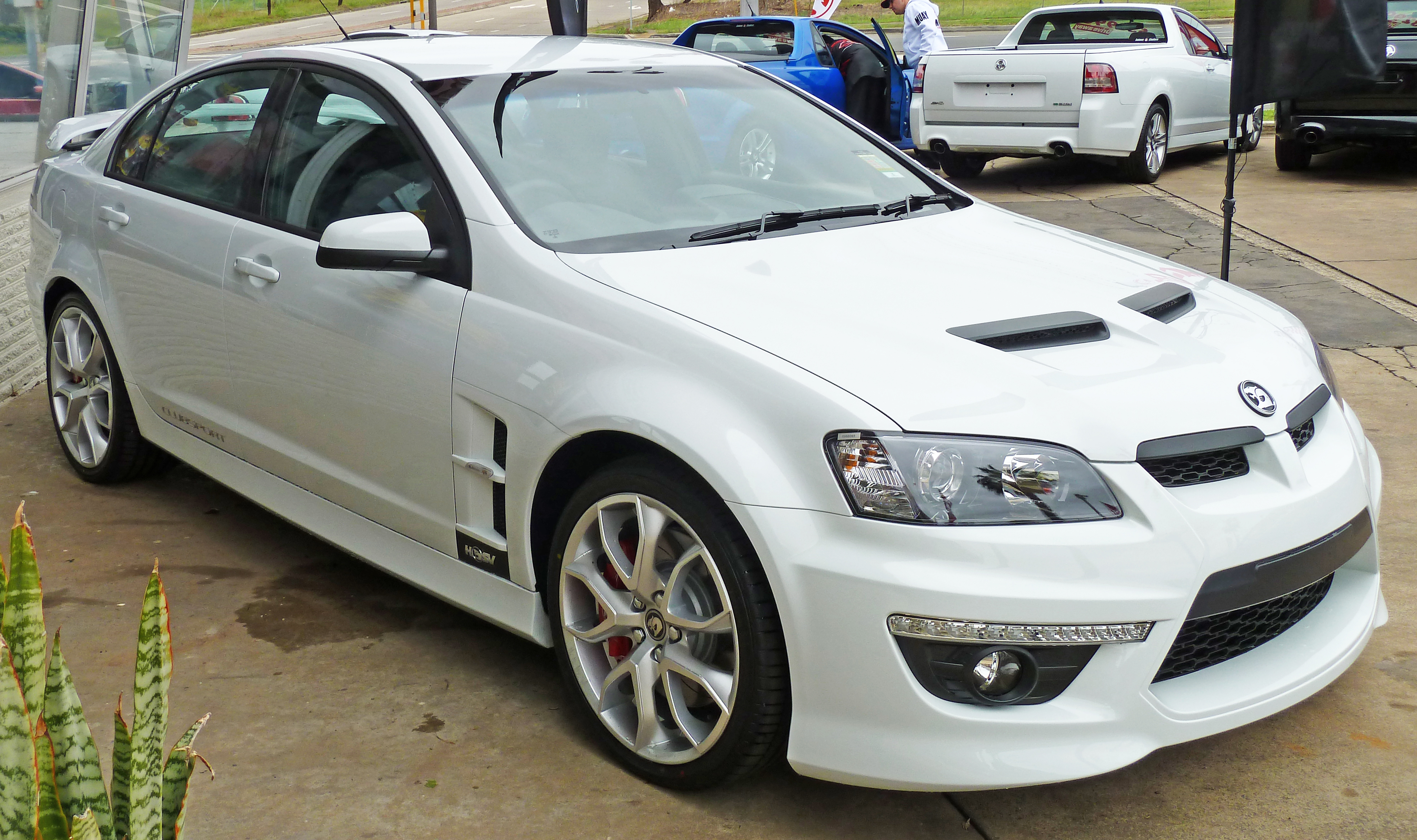
- 2011 HSV ClubSport (VE Series 3)

Overview
- Manufacturer: Holden Special Vehicles
- Also called: CSV CR8; Vauxhall VXR8
- Production: 1990–2017
- Assembly: Australia: Notting Hill, Victoria; Clayton, Victoria

Body and chassis
- Class: Full-size
- Body style: 4-door sedan; 5-door station wagon
- Platform: GM V platform (1990–2006); GM Zeta Platform (2006–2017)
- Related: Holden Commodore

Powertrain
- Engine: 5.0L '5000i' Holden V8 engine; 5.7L 'LS1' V8; 6.0L 'LS2' V8; 6.2L 'LS3' V8; 6.2L 'LSA' Supercharged V8
- Transmission: 5 Speed Manual; 6 Speed Manual; 4 Speed Automatic; 6 Speed Automatic

Chronology
- Predecessor: Holden Commodore SS Group A SV

The HSV ClubSport is a performance full-size sedan built by Holden's designated performance vehicle division Holden Special Vehicles from 1990 to 2017. A wagon variant was offered in the VR series, and later in the E-Series.

== History ==
The Clubsport was introduced in the VN series, launched in June 1990, with a Holden V8 engine at 180 kW (241 hp). The VP series Clubsport, launched October 1991 had the same power, the VP Clubsport 5000i, launched in May 1993 being at 200 kW (268 hp). VR Series and VS series Clubsport with a Holden V8 at 185 kW (248 hp), with the VR series including a Clubsport wagon.

The VT Series ClubSport, launched September 1997 was offered with a 5.0-litre Holden V8 at 195 kW (261 hp) in Series I, being replaced with a 5.7-litre LS1 at 250 kW (335 hp) with the release Series II in 1999. The HSV ClubSport R8 was introduced in VT Series II ClubSport. The Hacket special edition was produced from August to September 2000.

The VX Series ClubSport, launched in 2000 was offered with LS1 at 255 kW (342 hp). The Y Series, launched in October 2002, offering with a LS1 at 260 kW (349 hp), the Y II series increased the power to 285 kW (382 hp), and a limited run ClubSport SE. The Z-Series ClubSport, launched October 2004, was offered with a LS2 at 297 kW (398 hp). In July 2005, The Clubsport and Clubsport R8 "Dealer Team Spec" (DTS) were introduced, comprising Stage 1 and optional Stage 2 packages, in manual only.

The E-Series ClubSport, launched in September 2006 was introduced with a LS2 at 307 kW (412 hp), transitioning to LS3 at 317 kW (425 hp) in April 2008. In September 2008 the HSV ClubSport R8 Tourer launched, based on the VE Sportwagon. The E Series 3 released in 2011, adding a bi-fuel option running on LPG and petrol, the option was not made available for the wagon.

The Gen-F ClubSport, launched in 2013 was powered by a LS3 at 317 kW (425 hp), with the ClubSport R8 at 325 kW (436 hp). The MY15 update increased the power to 325 kW (436 hp) for the base ClubSport and 340 kW (460 hp) for the R8. In 2016 ClubSport R8 LSA model was introduced, with supercharged LSA at 400 kW (540 hp). The ClubSport was discontinued in 2017.

== Exports ==
The ClubSport was exported to New Zealand without any rebranding.

=== Vauxhall VXR8 ===
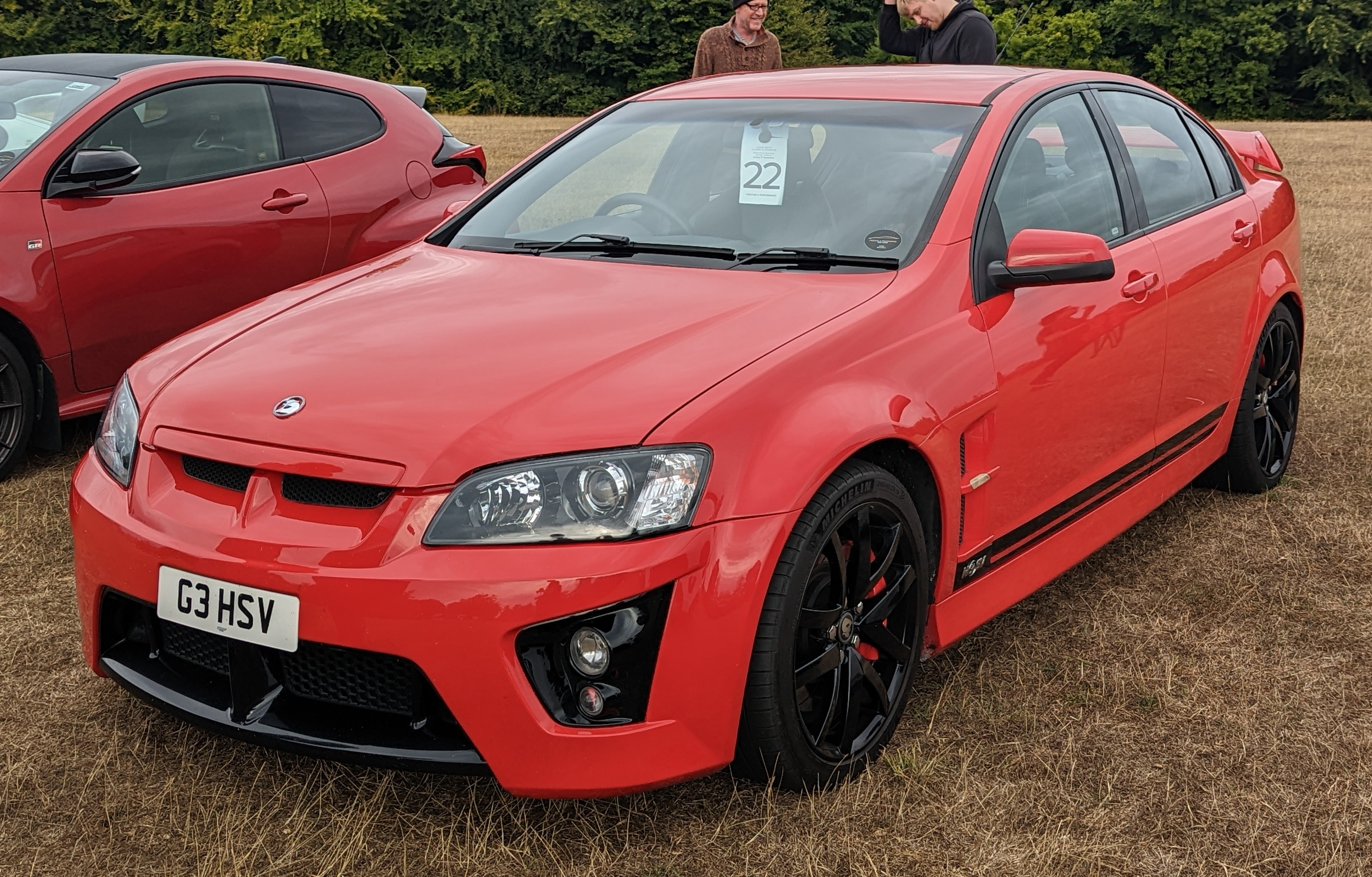
2008 Vauxhall VXR8

The Vauxhall VXR8 was launched in 2007, based on the E Series ClubSport R8, and was exported to the United Kingdom. It was marketed under Vauxhall's performance division VXR. The VXR8 Bathurst S, launched in 2009 was powered by a LS2 at 421 kW (565 bhp). In 2010 the VXR8 switched to being based on the HSV GTS.

=== CSV CR8 ===
External image
- 2008 CSV CR8

The CSV CR8 (CSV for Chevrolet Special Vehicles) was launched in 2008, based on the E Series ClubSport R8, and was exported to the Middle East. Unlike previous exports by HSV it was manufactured in left-hand drive.

Holden Special Vehicles previously shipped 20 Z series ClubSports to the Middle East to compete in the Chevrolet Supercars Middle East Championship.
