= Luigi Ferrara =

Italian racing driver from Bari

- Nationality: (Italy) Italian
- Born: 12 May 1982 (age 44) Bari, Italy

TCR International Series career
- Debut season: 2016
- Current team: Top Run Motorsport
- Car number: 32
- Starts: 3
- Wins: 0
- Poles: 0
- Fastest laps: 0
- Best finish: 26th in 2016

Luigi Ferrara (born 12 May 1982) is an Italian racing driver from Bari.

== Career ==
Ferrara began his career in feeder formula series such as the Formula Renault 2.0 Italia, Eurocup Formula Renault 2.0, Italian Formula Three and International Formula Master. He was the champion of the 2005 Italian Formula Three Championship with team Corbetta Competizioni.

Ferrara switched to sports car in 2008, and won the Porsche Carrera Cup Italy. In 2009, he raced part-time at the Porsche Supercup.

In 2010, Ferrara joined the Superstars Series with the CAAL team. Driving a Mercedes-Benz C 63 AMG, he collected four wins and ten podiums in 20 races, placing second in the International Series and third in the Italian Championship.

At the 2011 Superstars Series, Ferrara had one win and eight podiums in 18 races. He again placed second in the International Series and third in the Italian Championship.

Ferrara only competed in two rounds of the 2012 season: Spa-Francorchamps with CAAL and Pergusa with Roma, in both cases with a Mercedes-Benz. He finished second and fourth out of four races, and placed 16th in the International Series.

Ferrara returned full-time to the Superstars Series for the 2013, remaining in Roma.

== Racing record ==
=== Complete TCR International Series results ===
(key) (Races in bold indicate pole position) (Races in italics indicate fastest lap)

Year	Team	Car	1	2	3	4	5	6	7	8	9	10	11	12	13	14	15	16	17	18	19	20	21	22	DC	Points
2016	Top Run Motorsport	Subaru Impreza STi TCR	BHR; 1; 12	BHR; 2; 8	EST; 1	EST; 2	SPA; 1	SPA; 2	IMO; 1	IMO; 2	SAL; 1	SAL; 2	OSC; 1	OSC; 2	SOC; 1	SOC; 2	CHA; 1 Ret	CHA; 2 DNS	MRN; 1	MRN; 2	SEP; 1	SEP; 2	MAC; 1	MAC; 2	26th	4
2017	Top Run Motorsport	Subaru Impreza STi TCR	RIM; 1	RIM; 2	BHR; 1	BHR; 2	SPA; 1	SPA; 2	MNZ; 1	MNZ; 2	SAL; 1 DNS	SAL; 2 DNS	HUN; 1	HUN; 2	OSC; 1	OSC; 2	CHA; 1	CHA; 2	ZHE; 1	ZHE; 2	DUB; 1	DUB; 2			NC	0

=== Complete World Touring Car Cup results ===
(key) (Races in bold indicate pole position) (Races in italics indicate fastest lap)

Year	Team	Car	1	2	3	4	5	6	7	8	9	10	11	12	13	14	15	16	17	18	19	20	21	22	23	24	25	26	27	28	29	30	DC	Points
2018	Team Mulsanne	Alfa Romeo Giulietta TCR	MAR; 1	MAR; 2	MAR; 3	HUN; 1	HUN; 2	HUN; 3	GER; 1	GER; 2	GER; 3	NED; 1	NED; 2	NED; 3	POR; 1	POR; 2	POR; 3	SVK; 1	SVK; 2	SVK; 3	CHN; 1	CHN; 2	CHN; 3	WUH; 1	WUH; 2	WUH; 3	JPN; 1; 14	JPN; 2; 23†	JPN; 3 NC	MAC; 1; 9	MAC; 2; 8	MAC; 3 Ret	29th	8

^{†} Driver did not finish the race, but was classified as he completed over 90% of the race distance.

=== NASCAR ===
==== Whelen Euro Series – EuroNASCAR PRO ====
(key) (Bold – Pole position. Italics – Fastest lap. * – Most laps led. ^ – Most positions gained)

NASCAR Whelen Euro Series – EuroNASCAR PRO results
Year	Team	No.	Make	1	2	3	4	5	6	7	8	9	10	11	12	13	NWES	Pts
2019	42 Racing by FS Motorsport	42	Ford	VAL	VAL	FRA; 5	FRA; 23	BRH	BRH	MOS	MOS	VEN	HOC	HOC	ZOL	ZOL	38th	46
2020	Shadow Racing Cars by 42 Racing	42	Ford	ITA; 9	ITA; 15	ZOL; 10	ZOL; 17	MOS	MOS	VAL	VAL	ESP	ESP				23rd	97
2021	42 Racing	42	Shadow DNM8	ESP; 10	ESP; 20	GBR	GBR	CZE	CZE	CRO	CRO	BEL	BEL	ITA	ITA		35th	44

Sporting positions
Preceded by Matteo Cressoni	Italian Formula 3 Championship; Champion; 2005	Succeeded by Mauro Massironi
Preceded by Andrea Boldrini	Porsche Carrera Cup Italy; Champion; 2008	Succeeded by Alessandro Balzan
