= Riccardo Romagnoli =

Italian racing driver

Riccardo Romagnoli (born 11 July 1963 in Rome) is an Italian auto racing driver who currently competes in the NASCAR Whelen Euro Series

== Career ==
In 2008, Romagnoli competed in the FIA GT3 European Championship for La Torre Motorsport in a Dodge Viper.

Romagnoli's early racing career included a fifth-place finish in the 1994 Italian Formula Three season. Since then he has raced in the Italian Renault Megane Cup, finishing as runner-up in 2001 and 2002. after that he spent three years in the Italian Renault Clio Cup, before moving on to the Italian Superturismo Championship in 2006. He ended the season in fourth place overall. This season also combined with the opening two rounds of the FIA World Touring Car Championship for the independent La Torre Team in an Alfa Romeo 156.

=== Complete WTCC results ===
(key) (Races in bold indicate pole position) (Races in italics indicate fastest lap)

Year	Team	Car	1		2		3	4	5	6	7	8	9	10	Position	Points
2006	Scuderia La Torre	Alfa Romeo 156	MON (Italy)		MGN (France)		BRA (United Kingdom)	OSC (Germany)	CUR (Brazil)	PUE (Mexico)	BRN (Czech Republic)	IST (Turkey)	VAL (Spain)	MAC (Macau)	NC	0
2006	Scuderia La Torre	Alfa Romeo 156	17	16	26	18									NC	0
