= Gianni Morbidelli =

Italian racing driver (born 1968)

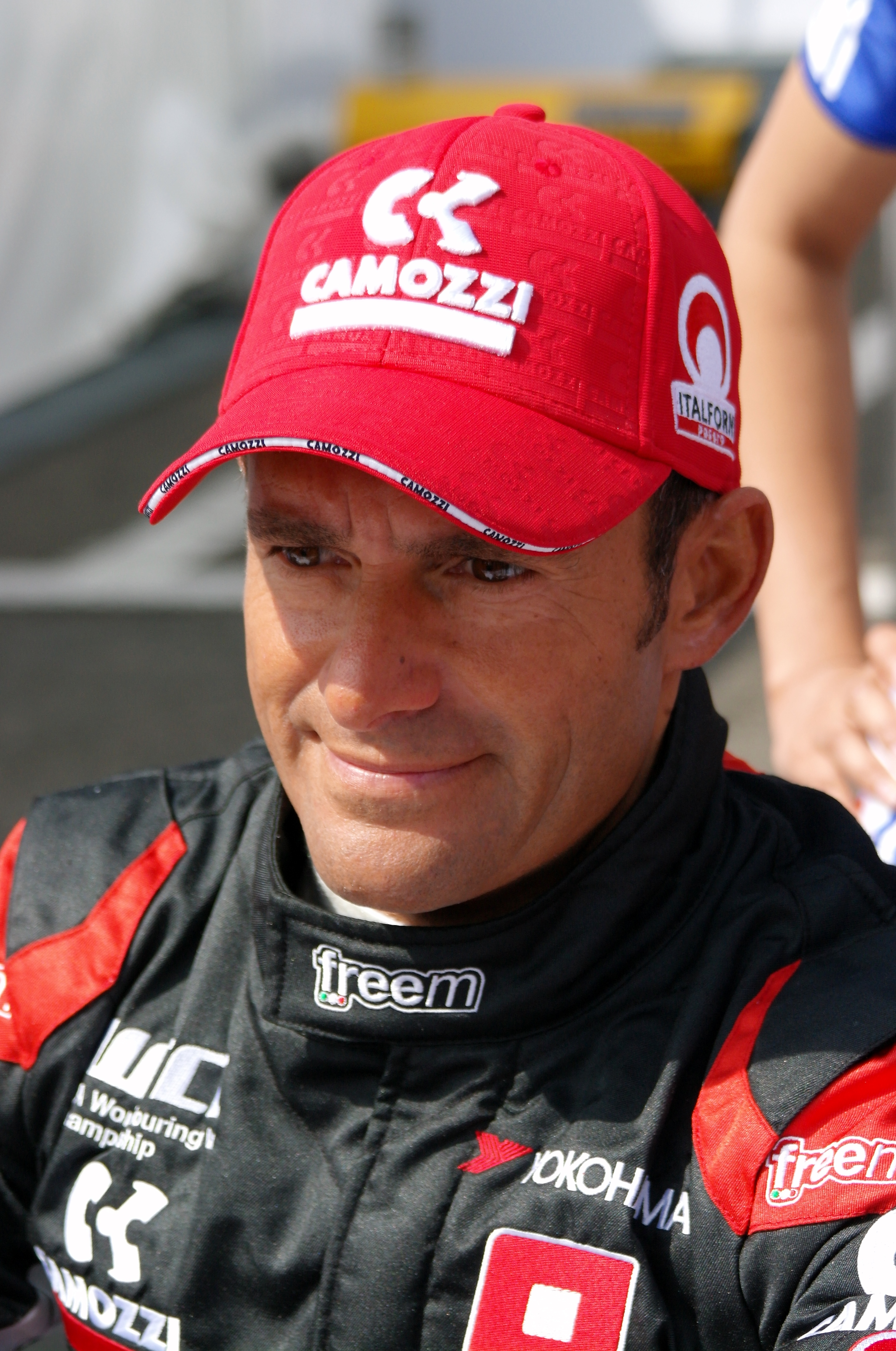
- Morbidelli at the 2014 FIA WTCC Race of Belgium
- Nationality: (Italy) Italian
- Born: 13 January 1968 (age 58) Pesaro, Italy

World Touring Car Championship career
- Debut season: 2006
- Current team: ALL-INKL.COM Münnich Motorsport
- Car number: 10
- Former teams: N. Technology
- Starts: 42
- Wins: 1
- Poles: 1
- Fastest laps: 0
- Best finish: 9th in 2014

Previous series
- 2017 2016 2015 2014 2010–2012 2009–2013 2006 2002 2001 2000 1998 1996 1995 1993 1990–1997: TCR; TCR; TCR; WTCC; V8 Supercars; Superstars Series; WTCC; ETCC; Euro STC; Euro STC; BTCC; Italian Superturismo; Italian Superturismo; Italian Superturismo; Formula One

Formula One World Championship career
- Active years: 1990–1992, 1994–1995, 1997
- Team(s): Scuderia Italia, Minardi, Ferrari, Footwork, Sauber
- Entries: 70 (67 starts)
- Championships: 0
- Wins: 0
- Podiums: 1
- Career points: 8.5
- Pole positions: 0
- Fastest laps: 0
- First entry: 1990 United States Grand Prix
- Last entry: 1997 Japanese Grand Prix

Gianni Morbidelli (born 13 January 1968) is an Italian racing driver. He participated in 70 Formula One Grands Prix, debuting on 11 March 1990. He achieved one podium and scored a total of 8.5 championship points. He most recently competed in the TCR International Series.

== Racing career ==
=== Early career ===
Morbidelli was born in Pesaro. His father, Giancarlo Morbidelli, was the founder of the Morbidelli motorcycle company, which had some success in Grand Prix motorcycle racing. Morbidelli started karting in 1980. He won the EUR-AM championship in 1986, before moving to Italian Formula Three. He became Italian Formula 3 and Formula 3 European Cup champion in 1989, as well as winning two races in Italian Touring Cars. He then moved to the Scuderia Italia Formula One team, doing the first two races of the 1990 F1 season as stand-in for Emanuele Pirro, before concentrating on Formula 3000. He won one race and finished fifth in the 1990 championship, as well as undertaking test driver duties for Scuderia Ferrari for that year.

=== Formula One ===
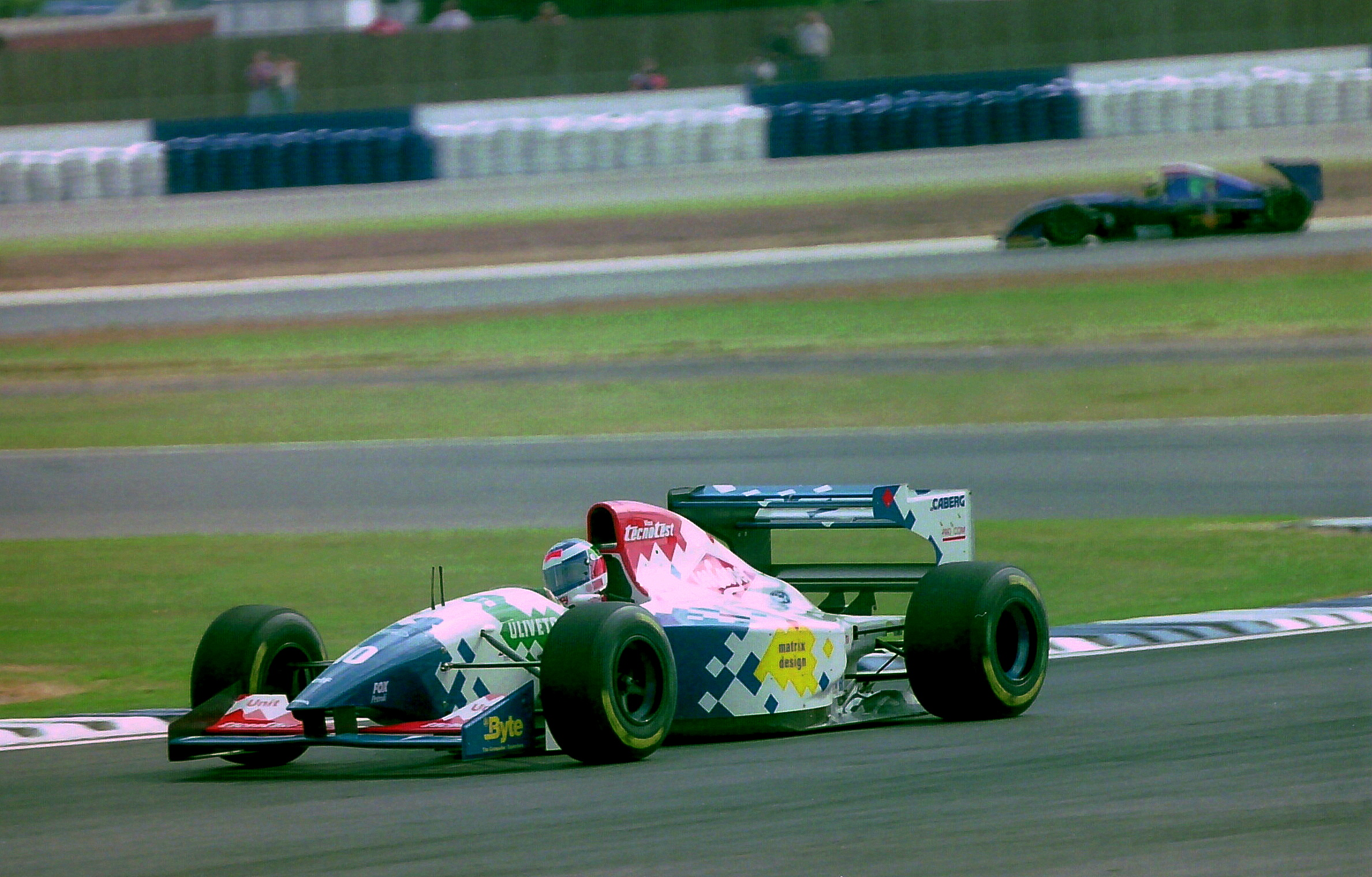
Morbidelli driving his Footwork FA15 during the 1994 British Grand Prix

Resuming his F1 career at the end of the 1990 season, Morbidelli competed in the final two races of the season with Minardi, where he remained until the end of 1992. He briefly joined Ferrari for the 1991 Australian Grand Prix, drafted in after Alain Prost was fired by the team, where Morbidelli earned his first Formula One points, earning half a point for 6th after a rain-shortened race. A lack of sponsorship led to him leaving Minardi to rejoin Italian Touring Cars for 1993, where he drove an Alfa Romeo 155 to two wins for Alfa Corse, before being hired by Footwork Arrows for 1994. He managed four-point-scoring positions in two years with the team, including his only podium place finish in the 1995 Australian Grand Prix, earning third place in a race of high attrition. Morbidelli became Footwork Arrows' most successful driver, with a total of eight points for the team.

Morbidelli also competed in the Italian Superturismo Championship for 1995, scoring two race wins, and, after spending a year out in 1996 testing for Jordan, gained another podium that year. Back in Formula One for 1997, he raced in several mid-season events for Sauber as a replacement for Nicola Larini. He scored no points and was not classified in the championship for that year. His unsuccessful season and two injuries from separate testing accidents led to Morbidelli retiring from Formula One racing.

=== Post-Formula One ===
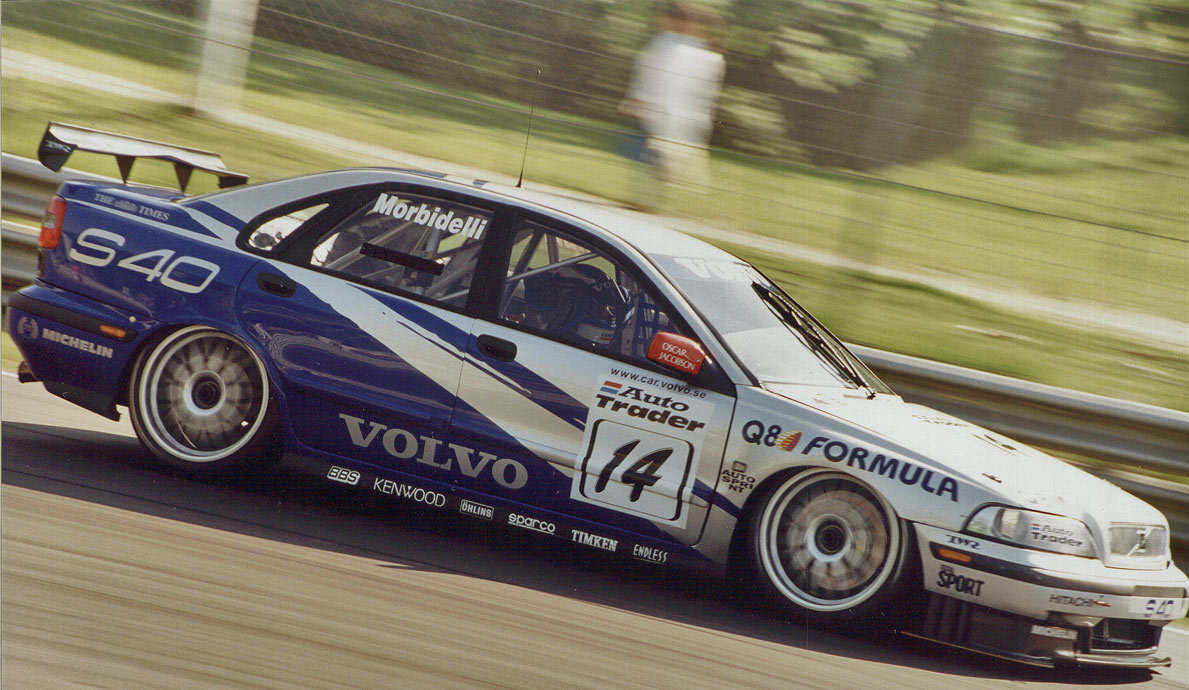
Morbidelli driving for Volvo in the 1998 British Touring Car Championship

In 1998, Morbidelli drove for Volvo in the British Touring Car Championship, but was not as competitive as his teammate Rickard Rydell, who won that year's title. His only competitive showing was in the summer meeting at Thruxton, where he charged from near the back of the pack to finish fourth, passing many cars in the process. Morbidelli then spent several years in various European touring car series', with a high point in the 2001 European Touring Car Championship, where he raced the BMW 320i to fifth place in the championship, winning the last race at Estoril. Morbidelli raced in the Italian round of the 2004 season in a SEAT Toledo, but scored no points and did not contest in further meetings.

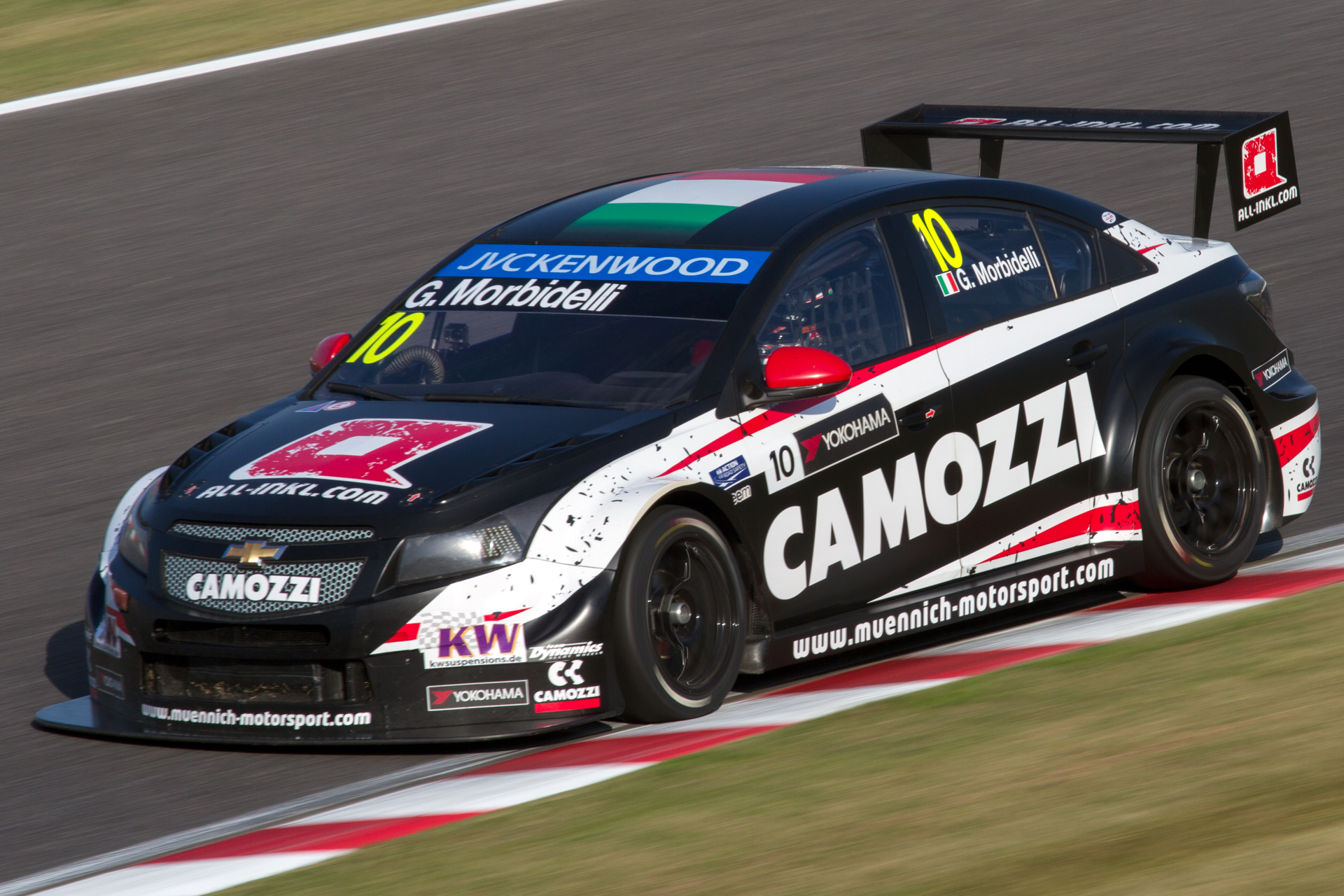
Morbidelli competing in the 2014 World Touring Car Championship

Morbidelli drove a Lamborghini in several grand tourer races in 2005, and moved back to touring cars for 2006. Competing in the World Touring Car Championship for N-Technology, he managed two second places in an Alfa Romeo 156. Not as competitive as when he was driving the BMW, he moved back to GT racing for 2007, winning two races in the ADAC GT Masters series. He has had considerable success in the Italian Superstars Championship, where Morbidelli won the title with both Audi RS4 and BMW M3 three years in a row from 2007. The short-lived Speedcar Series gave him another championship title, where he won the 2008–09 championship. The season featured a close fight with defending champion Johnny Herbert, with Morbidelli finishing one place ahead in the final round to win the title.

Morbidelli made his WTCC return in 2014, driving a Chevrolet Cruze for Münnich Motorsport. He made his debut in the FIA World Rallycross Championship with the same team at his home round in 2015.

== Racing record ==
=== Career summary ===
Season	Series	Team	Races	Wins	Poles	F/laps	Podiums	Points	Position
1987	Italian Formula Three	Euroracing Junior Team	12	0	0	0	1	7	11th
1988	Italian Formula Three	Forti Corse	12	1	2	2	4	25	5th
1988	Macau Grand Prix	Forti Corse	1	0	0	0	0	N/A	7th
1989	Italian Formula Three	Forti Corse	11	6	4	3	6	59	**1st**
1989	Macau Grand Prix	Forti Corse	1	0	0	0	0	N/A	DNF
1989	FIA European Formula 3 Cup	Forti Corse	1	1	0	1	1	N/A	**1st**
1989	Italian Superturismo Championship	?	?	2	?	?	?	?	4th
1990	International Formula 3000	Forti Corse	11	1	1	0	3	20	5th
1990	Italian Superturismo Championship	CiBiEmme Engineering	4	1	1	2	1	30	18th
1990	Formula One	SCM Minardi	2	0	0	0	0	0	NC
1990	Formula One	BMS Scuderia Italia	1	0	0	0	0	0	NC
1991	Formula One	Minardi Team	15	0	0	0	0	0.5	24th
1991	Formula One	Scuderia Ferrari	1	0	0	0	0	0.5	24th
1992	Formula One	Minardi Team	15	0	0	0	0	0	NC
1993	Italian Superturismo Championship	Alfa Corse	12	2	0	0	3	38	12th
1994	Formula One	Footwork	16	0	0	0	0	3	22nd
1995	Italian Superturismo Championship	CiBiEmme Engineering	20	2	2	2	3	149	5th
1995	Formula One	Footwork	10	0	0	0	1	5	14th
1996	Italian Superturismo Championship	CiBiEmme Engineering	8	0	0	0	2	50	8th
1997	Formula One	Red Bull Sauber Petronas	7	0	0	0	0	0	NC
1998	British Touring Car Championship	Volvo S40 Racing	25	0	0	0	0	56	11th
2000	European Touring Car Championship	CiBiEmme Engineering	20	5	0	3	10	202	**3rd**
2001	European Super Production Championship	CiBiEmme Engineering	10	1	1	0	3	75	5th
2002	European Touring Car Championship	Carly Motors Team Isert	6	0	0	0	0	0	NC
2002	American Le Mans Series	American Viperacing	1	0	0	0	0	15	40th
2004	FIA GT Championship	GPC Giesse Squadra Corse	8	0	0	0	0	14	16th
2004	European Touring Car Championship	SEAT Sport Italia	2	0	0	0	0	0	NC
2005	Italian GT Championship	Reiter Engineering	4	0	0	1	0	8	25th
2005	FIA GT Championship	GPC Sport	1	0	0	0	0	0	NC
2006	World Touring Car Championship	N.Technology	19	0	0	0	2	22	14th
2007	ADAC GT Masters	Reiter Engineering	8	2	0	0	5	49	5th
2007	Campionato Italiano Superstars	Audi Sport Italia	7	6	6	7	6	137	**1st**
2008	Speedcar Series	Speedcar Team	10	3	1	1	5	33	5th
2008	Campionato Italiano Superstars	Audi Sport Italia	8	3	4	4	8	143	**1st**
2008	ADAC GT Masters	Reiter Engineering	2	0	0	0	0	0	NC
2008–09	Speedcar Series	Palm Beach / Palm Racing	9	1	0	0	5	55	**1st**
2009	Campionato Italiano Superstars	ROAL Motorsport	18	6	4	8	9	197	**1st**
2009	International Superstars Series	ROAL Motorsport	10	3	2	3	5	123	**1st**
2010	Campionato Italiano Superstars	Team BMW Italia	16	1	1	2	6	126	4th
2010	International Superstars Series	Team BMW Italia	12	0	0	0	3	74	6th
2010	V8 Supercars Championship	Triple F Racing	2	0	0	0	0	0	NC†
2011	Campionato Italiano Superstars	Hopmobile Audi Sport Italia	6	0	0	1	1	18	13th
2011	International Superstars Series	Hopmobile Audi Sport Italia	6	0	0	1	1	18	15th
2011	V8 Supercars Championship	Triple F Racing	2	0	0	0	0	45	79th
2012	International Superstars Series	Audi Sport Italia	15	4	2	5	4	128	4th
2012	Campionato Italiano Superstars	Audi Sport Italia	9	0	0	2	0	37	10th
2012	V8 Supercars Championship	Triple F Racing	2	0	0	0	0	0	NC†
2013	International Superstars Series	Audi Sport Italia	16	6	1	7	10	233	**1st**
2013	Campionato Italiano Superstars	Audi Sport Italia	10	5	1	8	7	170	**1st**
2014	World Touring Car Championship	All-Inkl.com Münnich Motorsport	23	1	0	0	1	109	9th
2015	TCR International Series	WestCoast Racing	21	3	4	5	8	243	4th
2015	FIA World Rallycross Championship	All-Inkl.com Münnich Motorsport	2	0	0	0	0	0	40th
2016	TCR International Series	WestCoast Racing	20	1	1	3	6	174	6th
2017	TCR International Series	WestCoast Racing	20	2	1	3	4	132	6th
2018	World Touring Car Cup	Team Mulsanne	13	0	0	0	0	0	35th
2019	TCR Europe Touring Car Series	WestCoast Racing	14	0	0	0	0	135	13th
2025	Thailand Super Series - GTC	Tecpro Barriers Racing							

^{†} Not eligible for points.

=== Complete International Formula 3000 results ===
(key) (Races in bold indicate pole position; races in italics indicate fastest lap.)

Year	Entrant	1	2	3	4	5	6	7	8	9	10	11	DC	Points
1990	Forti Corse	DON; 8	SIL; Ret	PAU; 3	JER; Ret	MNZ; 4	PER; 1	HOC; Ret	BRH; Ret	BIR; Ret	BUG; 7	**NOG**; 3	5th	20

=== Complete Formula One results ===
Year	Entrant	Chassis	Engine	1	2	3	4	5	6	7	8	9	10	11	12	13	14	15	16	17	WDC	Points
1990	BMS Scuderia Italia	Dallara F190	Ford Cosworth DFR 3.5 V8	USA; DNQ	BRA; 14	SMR	MON	CAN	MEX	FRA	GBR	GER	HUN	BEL	ITA	POR	ESP				NC	0
1990	SCM Minardi	Minardi M190	Ford Cosworth DFR 3.5 V8															JPN; Ret	AUS; Ret		NC	0
1991	Minardi Team	Minardi M191	Ferrari 037 3.5 V12	USA; Ret	BRA; 8	SMR; Ret	MON; Ret	CAN; Ret	MEX; 7	FRA; Ret	GBR; 11	GER; Ret	HUN; 13	BEL; Ret	ITA; 9	POR; 9	ESP; 14	JPN; Ret			24th	0.5
1991	Scuderia Ferrari	Ferrari 643	Ferrari 037 3.5 V12																AUS; 6		24th	0.5
1992	Minardi Team	Minardi M191B	Lamborghini 3512 3.5 V12	RSA; Ret	MEX; Ret	BRA; 7	ESP; Ret														NC	0
1992	Minardi Team	Minardi M192	Lamborghini 3512 3.5 V12					SMR; Ret	MON; Ret	CAN; 11	FRA; 8	GBR; 17	GER; 12	HUN; DNQ	BEL; 16	ITA; Ret	POR; 14	JPN; 14	AUS; 10		NC	0
1994	Footwork	Footwork FA15	Ford HBE7/8 3.5 V8	BRA; Ret	PAC; Ret	SMR; Ret	MON; Ret	ESP; Ret	CAN; Ret	FRA; Ret	GBR; Ret	GER; 5	HUN; Ret	BEL; 6	ITA; Ret	POR; 9	EUR; 11	JPN; Ret	AUS; Ret		22nd	3
1995	Footwork	Footwork FA16	Hart 830 3.0 V8	BRA; Ret	ARG; Ret	SMR; 13	ESP; 11	MON; 9	CAN; 6	FRA; 14	GBR	GER	HUN	BEL	ITA	POR	EUR	PAC; Ret	JPN; Ret	AUS; 3	14th	5
1997	Red Bull Sauber Petronas	Sauber C16	Petronas SPE-01 3.0 V10	AUS	BRA	ARG	SMR	MON	ESP; 14	CAN; 10	FRA	GBR	GER	HUN; Ret	BEL; 9	ITA; 12	AUT; 9	LUX; 9	JPN; DNS	EUR	NC	0

=== Complete Italian Superturismo Championship results ===
(key) (Races in bold indicate pole position) (Races in italics indicate fastest lap)

Year	Team	Car	1	2	3	4	5	6	7	8	9	10	11	12	13	14	15	16	17	18	19	20	DC	Pts
1993	Alfa Corse	Alfa Romeo 155 TS	MNZ; 1	MNZ; 2	VAL; 1	VAL; 2	MIS; 1 Ret	MIS; 2; 9	MAG; 1; 1	MAG; 2; 1	BIN; 1; 14	BIN; 2 Ret	IMO; 1 Ret	IMO; 2; 7	VAR; 1; 16	VAR; 2; 3	MIS; 1; 16	MIS; 2 Ret	PER; 1	PER; 2	MUG; 1	MUG; 2	9th	58
1995	CiBiEmme Engineering	BMW 318i	MIS; 1 Ret	MIS; 2; 6	BIN; 1; 6	BIN; 2; 7	MNZ; 1; 5	MNZ; 2; 4	IMO; 1; 7	IMO; 2 Ret	MAG; 1; 5	MAG; 2; 4	MUG; 1; 5	MUG; 2; 7	MIS; 1; 3	MIS; 2; 11	PER; 1; 1	PER; 2; 1	VAR; 1; 10	VAR; 2; 4	VAL; 1; 6	VAL; 2; 5	5th	149
1996	CiBiEmme Engineering	BMW 320i	MUG; 1	MUG; 2	MAG; 1	MAG; 2	MNZ; 1	MNZ; 2	BIN; 1	BIN; 2	MIS; 1	MIS; 2	IMO; 1	IMO; 2	PER; 1; 4	PER; 2 Ret	PER; 1; 3	PER; 2; 3	VAR; 1 DSQ	VAR; 2; 5	VAL; 1; 17	VAL; 2; 5	8th	50

=== Complete British Touring Car Championship results ===
(key) (Races in bold indicate pole position – 1 point awarded all races) (Races in italics indicate fastest lap) (* signifies that driver lead feature race for at least one lap – 1 point awarded)

Year	Team	Car	1	2	3	4	5	6	7	8	9	10	11	12	13	14	15	16	17	18	19	20	21	22	23	24	25	26	Pos	Pts
1998	Volvo S40 Racing	Volvo S40	THR; 1; 6	THR; 2; 11	SIL; 1; 8	SIL; 2; 5	DON; 1; 12	DON; 2 Ret	BRH; 1; 13	BRH; 2; 10	OUL; 1; 6	OUL; 2; 9*	DON; 1; 6	DON; 2; 7	CRO; 1; 10	CRO; 2; 7*	SNE; 1; 7	SNE; 2; 11	THR; 1; 8	THR; 2; 4*	KNO; 1; 11	KNO; 2 Ret	BRH; 1 Ret	BRH; 2 Ret	OUL; 1 Ret	OUL; 2; 9	SIL; 1; 17	SIL; 2 Ret	11th	56

=== Complete European Touring Car Championship results ===
(key) (Races in bold indicate pole position) (Races in italics indicate fastest lap)

Year	Team	Car	1	2	3	4	5	6	7	8	9	10	11	12	13	14	15	16	17	18	19	20	DC	Pts
2000	CiBiEmme Engineering	BMW 320i	MUG; 1; 3	MUG; 2; 4	PER; 1; 7	PER; 2 Ret	A1R; 1; 3	A1R; 2; 2	MNZ; 1; 9	MNZ; 2; 3	HUN; 1; 1	**HUN**; **2**; 1	IMO; 1; 7	IMO; 2; 5	MIS; 1; 1	**MIS**; **2**; 1	BRN; 1 Ret	BRN; 2; 3	VAL; 1; 5	VAL; 2; 11	MOB; 1; 8	MOB; 2; 1	3rd	202
2002	Carly Motors Team Isert	BMW 320i	MAG; 1; 10	MAG; 2; 7	SIL; 1; 15†	SIL; 2 DNS	BRN; 1 Ret	BRN; 2 DNS	JAR; 1; 16	JAR; 2 Ret	AND; 1	AND; 2	OSC; 1	OSC; 2	SPA; 1	SPA; 2	PER; 1	PER; 2	DON; 1	DON; 2	EST; 1	EST; 2	NC	0
2004	SEAT Sport Italia	SEAT Toledo Cupra	MNZ; 1; 11	MNZ; 2 Ret	VAL; 1	VAL; 2	MAG; 1	MAG; 2	HOC; 1	HOC; 2	BRN; 1	BRN; 2	DON; 1	DON; 2	SPA; 1	SPA; 2	IMO; 1	IMO; 2	OSC; 1	OSC; 2	DUB; 1	DUB; 2	NC	0

=== Complete European Super Production Championship results ===
(key) (Races in bold indicate pole position) (Races in italics indicate fastest lap)

Year	Team	Car	1	2	3	4	5	6	7	8	9	10	DC	Pts
2001	CiBiEmme Engineering	BMW 320i	**MNZ**; 3	BRN; Ret	MAG; 4	SIL; 4	ZOL; 11	HUN; 13	A1R; 2	NÜR; 5	JAR; Ret	EST; 1	5th	75

=== Complete World Touring Car Championship results ===
(key) (Races in bold indicate pole position) (Races in italics indicate fastest lap)

Year	Team	Car	1	2	3	4	5	6	7	8	9	10	11	12	13	14	15	16	17	18	19	20	21	22	23	24	DC	Points
2006	N. Technology	Alfa Romeo 156	ITA; 1; 29†	ITA; 2; 10	FRA; 1; 20	FRA; 2; 14	GBR; 1; 12	GBR; 2; 7	GER; 1; 9	GER; 2; 11	BRA; 1; 7	BRA; 2; 2	MEX; 1; 7	MEX; 2; 2	CZE; 1; 17	CZE; 2; 14	TUR; 1; 10	TUR; 2; 16	ESP; 1; 13	ESP; 2; 11	MAC; 1 Ret	MAC; 2 DNS					14th	22
2014	All-Inkl.com Münnich Motorsport	Chevrolet RML Cruze TC1	MAR; 1; 15	MAR; 2; 6	FRA; 1; 11	FRA; 2; 9	HUN; 1; 9	HUN; 2; 1	SVK; 1; 6	SVK; 2 C	AUT; 1; 10	AUT; 2; 6	RUS; 1; 12	RUS; 2; 8	BEL; 1; 4	**BEL**; **2**; 6	ARG; 1; 12	ARG; 2; 14	BEI; 1; 4	BEI; 2; 7	CHN; 1; 11	CHN; 2; 13	JPN; 1; 10	JPN; 2; 8	MAC; 1; 10	MAC; 2 Ret	9th	109

^{†} Driver did not finish the race, but was classified as he completed over 90% of the race distance.

=== Complete Campionato Italiano Superstars results ===
(key) (Races in bold indicate pole position) (Races in italics indicate fastest lap)

Year	Team	Car	1	2	3	4	5	6	7	8	9	10	11	12	13	14	15	16	DC	Points
2007	Audi Sport Italia	Audi RS4 (B7)	ADR; DNS	MNZ; Ret	**MAG**; 1^{1}	**MIS**; 1^{1}	**NÜR**; 1^{1}	**ADR**; 1^{2}	**VAL**; 1^{1}	**MNZ**; 1^{1}									**1st**	**137**
2008	Audi Sport Italia	Audi RS4 (B7)	**VAL**; 1^{1}	MUG; 2^{3}	**MNZ**; 2^{1}	MAG; 1^{2}	**VNC**; 1^{1}	VAR; 3^{3}	MIS; 3^{3}	**ADR**; 3^{1}									**1st**	**143**
2009	ROAL Motorsport	BMW M3 (E90)	IMO; R1; 2	IMO; R2; Ret	ADR; R1; Ret	ADR; R2; 4	MAG; R1; 1	MAG; R2; 2	**MUG**; **R1**; 11	MUG; R2; 12	**ALG**; **R1**; 1	ALG; R2; 1	**VAL**; **R1**; 1	VAL; R2; 1	**MUG**; **R1**; 2	MUG; R2; 5	MNZ; R1; 9	MNZ; R2; 1	**1st**	**197**
2010	Team BMW Italia	BMW M3 (E92)	MNZ; R1; 3	MNZ; R2; Ret	IMO; R1; 5	IMO; R2; 17	**VAL**; **R1**; 1	VAL; R2; Ret	ALG; R1; 6	ALG; R2; 2	MUG; R1; 2	MUG; R2; 3	VAR; R1; 4	VAR; R2; 4	CPR; R1; 2	CPR; R2; Ret	VAL; R1; 12	VAL; R2; 18	4th	126
2011	Hopmobile Audi Sport Italia	Audi RS4	MNZ; R1	MNZ; R2	MIS; R1	MIS; R2	MIS; R1; DNS	MIS; R2; DNS	SPA; R1; 15	SPA; R2; Ret	MUG; R1; Ret	MUG; R2; 9	VAL; R1; Ret	VAL; R2; 2					13th	18
2012	Audi Sport Italia	Audi RS5	MNZ; R1; 7	MNZ; R2; 5	IMO; R1; 17	IMO; R2; 14	MUG; R1; Ret	MUG; R2; DNS	VAL; R1; 18	VAL; R2; 5	PER; R1; 6	PER; R2; Ret							10th	37
2013	Audi Sport Italia	Audi RS5	MNZ; R1; 4	MNZ; R2; 4	ALG; R1; 1	ALG; R2; 1	IMO; R1; 2	IMO; R2; 1	VAL; R1; 3	VAL; R2; 7	**FRA**; **R1**; 1	FRA; R2; 1							**1st**	**170**

=== Complete International Superstars Series results ===
(key) (Races in bold indicate pole position) (Races in italics indicate fastest lap)

Year	Team	Car	1	2	3	4	5	6	7	8	9	10	11	12	13	14	15	16	DC	Points
2009	ROAL Motorsport	BMW M3 (E90)	IMO; R1; 2	IMO; R2; Ret	**ALG**; **R1**; 1	ALG; R2; 1	**MUG**; **R1**; 2	MUG; R2; 5	MNZ; R1; 9	MNZ; R2; 1	KYA; R1; 5	KYA; R2; 4							**1st**	**123**
2010	Team BMW Italia	BMW M3 (E92)	MNZ; R1; 3	MNZ; R2; Ret	IMO; R1; 5	IMO; R2; 17	ALG; R1; 6	ALG; R2; 2	HOC; R1; 4	HOC; R2; 5	CPR; R1; 2	CPR; R2; Ret	VAL; R1; 12	VAL; R2; 18	KYA; R1	KYA; R2			6th	74
2011	Hopmobile Audi Sport Italia	Audi RS4	MNZ; R1	MNZ; R2	VNC; R1	VNC; R2	ALG; R1	ALG; R2	DON; R1	DON; R2	MIS; R1; DNS	MIS; R2; DNS	SPA; R1; 15	SPA; R2; Ret	MUG; R1; Ret	MUG; R2; 9	VAL; R1; Ret	VAL; R2; 2	15th	18
2012	Audi Sport Italia	Audi RS5	MNZ; R1; 7	MNZ; R2; 5	IMO; R1; 17	IMO; R2; 14	**DON**; **R1**; 1	DON; R2; 1	MUG; R1; Ret	MUG; R2; DNS	HUN; R1; 13	HUN; R2; Ret	**SPA**; **R1**; 1	SPA; R2; 1	VAL; R1; 18	VAL; R2; 5	PER; R1; 6	PER; R2; Ret	4th	128
2013	Audi Sport Italia	Audi RS5	MNZ; R1; 4	MNZ; R2; 4	BRN; R1; 11	BRN; R2; 2	SVK; R1; Ret	SVK; R2; 3	**ZOL**; **R1**; 1	ZOL; R2; 1	ALG; R1; 1	ALG; R2; 1	DON; R1; 4	DON; R2; 1	IMO; R1; 2	IMO; R2; 1	VAL; R1; 3	VAL; R2; 7	**1st**	**233**

=== Complete V8 Supercar results ===
Year	Team	1	2	3	4	5	6	7	8	9	10	11	12	13	14	15	16	17	18	19	20	21	22	23	24	25	26	27	28	29	30	31	Final pos	Points
2010	Triple F Racing	YMC; R1	YMC; R2	BHR; R3	BHR; R4	ADE; R5	ADE; R6	HAM; R7	HAM; R8	QLD; R9	QLD; R10	WIN; R11	WIN; R12	HDV; R13	HDV; R14	TOW; R15	TOW; R16	PHI; Q	PHI; R17	BAT; R18	SUR; R19; 9	SUR; R20; Ret	SYM; R21	SYM; R22	SAN; R23	SAN; R24	SYD; R25	SYD; R26					NC	0 †
2011	Triple F Racing	YMC; R1	YMC; R2	ADE; R3	ADE; R4	HAM; R5	HAM; R6	PER; R7	PER; R8	PER; R9	WIN; R10	WIN; R11	HDV; R12	HDV; R13	TOW; R14	TOW; R15	QLD; R16	QLD; R17	QLD; R18	PHI; Q	PHI; R19	BAT; R20	SUR; R21; Ret	SUR; R22; 22	SYM; R23	SYM; R24	SAN; R25	SAN; R26	SYD; R27	SYD; R28			79th	45
2012	Triple F Racing	ADE; R1	ADE; R2	SYM; R3	SYM; R4	HAM; R5	HAM; R6	PER; R7	PER; R8	PER; R9	PHI; R10	PHI; R11	HDV; R12	HDV; R13	TOW; R14	TOW; R15	QLD; R16	QLD; R17	SMP; R18	SMP; R19	SAN; Q	SAN; R20	BAT; R21	SUR; R22; 17	SUR; R23; 19	YMC; R24	YMC; R25	YMC; R26	WIN; R27	WIN; R28	SYD; R29	SYD; R30	NC	0 †

† Not eligible for points.

=== Complete TCR International Series results ===
(key) (Races in bold indicate pole position) (Races in italics indicate fastest lap)

Year	Team	Car	1	2	3	4	5	6	7	8	9	10	11	12	13	14	15	16	17	18	19	20	21	22	DC	Points
2015	WestCoast Racing	Honda Civic TCR	SEP; 1; 4	SEP; 2; 3	**SHA**; **1**; 1	SHA; 2; 3	VAL; 1; 8	**VAL**; **2**; 3	ALG; 1 Ret	ALG; 2 Ret	**MNZ**; **1**; 1	MNZ; 2; 1	SAL; 1; 5	SAL; 2; 3	SOC; 1; 7	SOC; 2 DNS	**RBR**; **1**; 11	RBR; 2 Ret	MRN; 1; 3	MRN; 2; 4	**CHA**; **1**; 10	CHA; 2 Ret	MAC; 1; 6	MAC; 2; 4	4th	243
2016	WestCoast Racing	Honda Civic TCR	BHR; 1; 2	BHR; 2; 7	EST; 1; 1	EST; 2; 3	SPA; 1; 5	SPA; 2 Ret	**IMO**; **1** Ret	IMO; 2 Ret	SAL; 1; 4	SAL; 2; 6	OSC; 1; 7	OSC; 2; 10	SOC; 1; 3	SOC; 2; 12†	CHA; 1; 3	CHA; 2 Ret	MRN; 1; 10	MRN; 2; 7	SEP; 1 DNS	SEP; 2; 3	MAC; 1 Ret	MAC; 2 DNS	6th	174
2017	WestCoast Racing	Volkswagen Golf GTI TCR	RIM; 1; 10	RIM; 2; 7	BHR; 1; 9	BHR; 2; 10	SPA; 1; 12	SPA; 2; 15	MNZ; 1; 11	MNZ; 2; 16	SAL; 1; 13	SAL; 2; 5	HUN; 1; 9	HUN; 2 Ret	**OSC**; **1**; 1	OSC; 2; 1	CHA; 1; 10	CHA; 2; 13	ZHE; 1; 4	ZHE; 2; 2	DUB; 1; 16	DUB; 2; 2			6th	132

^{†} Driver did not finish the race, but was classified as he completed over 75% of the race distance.

=== Complete FIA World Rallycross Championship results ===
==== Supercar ====
Year	Entrant	Car	1	2	3	4	5	6	7	8	9	10	11	12	13	Pos.	Points
2015	All-Inkl.com Münnich Motorsport	Audi S3	POR	HOC	BEL	GBR	GER	SWE	CAN	NOR	FRA	ESP	TUR	ITA; 19	ARG; 19	40th	0

=== Complete World Touring Car Cup results ===
(key) (Races in bold indicate pole position) (Races in italics indicate fastest lap)

Year	Team	Car	1	2	3	4	5	6	7	8	9	10	11	12	13	14	15	16	17	18	19	20	21	22	23	24	25	26	27	28	29	30	DC	Points
2018	Team Mulsanne	Alfa Romeo Giulietta TCR	MAR; 1; 20†	MAR; 2 Ret	MAR; 3 Ret	HUN; 1 Ret	HUN; 2; 22	HUN; 3; 14	GER; 1 Ret	GER; 2; 15	GER; 3 Ret	NED; 1; 13	NED; 2; 13	NED; 3; 21	POR; 1 Ret	POR; 2 DNS	POR; 3 DNS	SVK; 1	SVK; 2	SVK; 3	CHN; 1	CHN; 2	CHN; 3	WUH; 1	WUH; 2	WUH; 3	JPN; 1	JPN; 2	JPN; 3	MAC; 1	MAC; 2	MAC; 3	35th	0

^{†} Driver did not finish the race, but was classified as he completed over 90% of the race distance.

=== Complete TCR Europe Touring Car Series results ===
(key) (Races in bold indicate pole position) (Races in italics indicate fastest lap)

Year	Team	Car	1	2	3	4	5	6	7	8	9	10	11	12	13	14	DC	Points
2019	WestCoast Racing	Volkswagen Golf GTI TCR	HUN; 1; 8	HUN; 2 Ret	HOC; 1 Ret	HOC; 2; 11	SPA; 1; 14	SPA; 2; 10	RBR; 1; 11	RBR; 2; 5	OSC; 1; 5	OSC; 2 Ret	CAT; 1; 10	CAT; 2; 13	MNZ; 1 Ret	MNZ; 2; 5	13th	135

Sporting positions
Preceded by Joachim Winkelhock	FIA European Formula Three Cup; Winner; 1989	Succeeded by Alessandro Zanardi
Preceded by Emanuele Naspetti	Italian Formula Three Championship; Champion; 1989	Succeeded by Roberto Colciago
Preceded by Luis Pérez-Sala	Formula One Indoor Trophy; Winner; 1990	Succeeded by Gabriele Tarquini
Preceded by Max Pigoli	Superstars Series; Italian Champion; 2007, 2008, 2009	Succeeded by Thomas Biagi
Preceded by Johnny Herbert	Speedcar Series; Champion; 2008–09	Succeeded by None (Series ended)
Preceded by Stefano Gabellini	Superstars Series; International Champion; 2009	Succeeded by Thomas Biagi
Preceded by Johan Kristoffersson	Superstars Series; International & Italian Champion; 2013	Succeeded by Francesco Sini (EuroV8 Series)
