= 2008 Superstars Series =

Seasons
- ← 2007 2009 →

The 2008 Superstars Series season was the fifth season of the Campionato Italiano Superstars (Italian Superstars Championship) and the second season of the International Superstars Series. The Italian championship was won by Gianni Morbidelli driving for Audi, while the international series was won by Stefano Gabellini driving for BMW.

== Teams and drivers ==
Team	Car	No.	Drivers	Rounds
(Italy) Audi Sport Italia	Audi RS4 (B7)	1	(Italy) Gianni Morbidelli	All
(Italy) Audi Sport Italia	Audi RS4 (B7)	4	(Colombia) Steven Goldstein	1–6
(Italy) Audi Sport Italia	Audi RS4 (B7)	4	(Italy) Simone Campedelli	7
(Italy) Audi Sport Italia	Audi RS4 (B7)	4	(Italy) Agostino Penna	8
(Italy) Audi Sport Italia	Audi RS4 (B7)	44	(Italy) Giorgio Sanna	All
(Italy) Audi Sport Italia	Audi RS4 (B7)	45	(Italy) Marco Baroncini	6
(Italy) Ferlito Motors	Jaguar S-Type R	2	(Italy) Davide Rigon	2
(Italy) Ferlito Motors	Jaguar S-Type R	2	(Italy) Francesco Iorio	4
(Italy) Ferlito Motors	Jaguar S-Type R	2	(Italy) Ermanno Dionisio	6
(Italy) Ferlito Motors	Jaguar S-Type R	3	(Italy) Ermanno Dionisio	7
(Italy) Ferlito Motors	Jaguar S-Type R	3	(Italy) Alessandro Cicognani	2
(Italy) Ferlito Motors	Jaguar S-Type R	3	(Italy) Claudio Melotto	6
(Italy) Lanza Motorsport	BMW M5 (E39)	6	(Italy) Maurizio Strada	2–3
(Italy) Lanza Motorsport	BMW M5 (E39)	52	(Italy) Mauro Simoncini	3
(Italy) GASS Racing	BMW M5 (E39)	7	(Italy) Alessandro Battaglin	1–3
(Italy) Millenium Team	BMW 550i (E60)	9	(Italy) Maurizio Lusuardi	7
(Italy) Millenium Team	BMW 550i (E60)	69	(Italy) Kristian Ghedina	1–4, 6
(Italy) ROAL Motorsport	BMW M3 (E90)	9	(Italy) Luca Rangoni	6
(Italy) ROAL Motorsport	BMW M3 (E90)	69	(Italy) Kristian Ghedina	7–8
(Italy) Speedstar Team	Mercedes-Benz C63 AMG	18	(Italy) Max Pigoli	2–3, 6–8
(Italy) Speedstar Team	Mercedes-Benz C63 AMG	18	(Italy) Claudio Melotto	4
(San Marino) Habitat Racing	BMW 550i (E60)	21	(Italy) Francesco Ascani	All
(Germany) Racing4You	Chrysler 300C SRT-8	17	(Germany) Sascha Bert	1
(Germany) Racing4You	Chrysler 300C SRT-8	17	(Italy) Davide Rigon	4–5
(Italy) Santucci Motorsport	Cadillac CTS-V	33	(Italy) Roberto Benedetti	1, 7–8
(Italy) Santucci Motorsport	BMW M5 (E39)	34	(Italy) Fabrizio Fede	1
(Switzerland) Maurer Motorsport	Chevrolet Lumina CR8	46	(Spain) María de Villota	5
(Italy) CAAL Racing	BMW M5 (E39)	52	(Italy) Andrea Pagliai	1
(Italy) CAAL Racing	BMW M5 (E39)	52	(Italy) Moreno Petrini	2
(Italy) CAAL Racing	BMW M5 (E39)	52	(Italy) Mauro Cesari	4–6
(Italy) CAAL Racing	BMW M5 (E39)	52	(Italy) Alessio Alcidi	8
(Italy) CAAL Racing	BMW 550i (E60)	54	(Italy) Stefano Gabellini	All
(Italy) CAAL Racing	BMW M5 (E39)	56	(Italy) Leonardo Baccarelli	1–5, 7–8
(Italy) CAAL Racing	BMW M5 (E39)	58	(Italy) Roberto Papini	All

- Audi Sport Italia and its drivers entered only the Italian Championship; nevertheless Steven Goldstein entered also the International Series from the third round.

== Calendar ==
Round	Circuit/Location	Date
1	(Italy) Autodromo Vallelunga "Piero Taruffi", Campagnano	April 20
2	(Italy) Autodromo Internazionale del Mugello, Scarperia	May 4
3	(Italy) Autodromo Nazionale di Monza, Monza	May 18
4	(Italy) Autodromo dell'Umbria, Magione	June 8
5	(Spain) Circuit de la Comunitat Valenciana "Ricardo Tormo", Valencia	June 29
6	(Italy) Autodromo "Riccardo Paletti", Varano de' Melegari	August 31
7	(Italy) Misano World Circuit, Misano Adriatico	September 14
8	(Italy) Adria International Raceway, Adria	September 28
9	(Germany) Motorsport Arena Oschersleben, Oschersleben	October 12

International Superstars Series only
Campionato Italiano Superstars only
Both championships

== Scoring system ==
Point system for qualifying
Position	Pole	2nd	3rd
Points	3	2	1

Points system for race
1st	2nd	3rd	4th	5th	6th	7th	8th	9th	10th
20	15	12	10	8	6	4	3	2	1

== Results ==
Round	Circuit	Series	Pole position	Fastest lap	Winning driver	Winning team
1	Vallelunga	Italian	(Italy) Gianni Morbidelli	(Italy) Gianni Morbidelli	(Italy) Gianni Morbidelli	(Italy) Audi Sport Italia
1	Vallelunga	International	(Italy) Stefano Gabellini	(Italy) Stefano Gabellini	(Italy) Stefano Gabellini	(Italy) CAAL Racing
2	Mugello	Italian	(Italy) Stefano Gabellini	(Italy) Giorgio Sanna	(Italy) Stefano Gabellini	(Italy) CAAL Racing
2	Mugello	International	(Italy) Stefano Gabellini	(Italy) Stefano Gabellini	(Italy) Stefano Gabellini	(Italy) CAAL Racing
3	Monza	Italian	(Italy) Gianni Morbidelli	(Italy) Gianni Morbidelli	(Italy) Giorgio Sanna	(Italy) Audi Sport Italia
3	Monza	International	(Italy) Roberto Papini	(Italy) Kristian Ghedina	(Italy) Kristian Ghedina	(Italy) Millenium Team
4	Magione	Italian	(Italy) Giorgio Sanna	(Italy) Giorgio Sanna	(Italy) Gianni Morbidelli	(Italy) Audi Sport Italia
5	Valencia	Italian	(Italy) Gianni Morbidelli	(Italy) Gianni Morbidelli	(Italy) Gianni Morbidelli	(Italy) Audi Sport Italia
5	Valencia	International	(Italy) Stefano Gabellini	(Italy) Stefano Gabellini	(Italy) Roberto Papini	(Italy) CAAL Racing
6	Varano	Italian	(Italy) Luca Rangoni	(Italy) Luca Rangoni	(Italy) Luca Rangoni	(Italy) ROAL Motorsport
7	Misano Adriatico	Italian	(Italy) Giorgio Sanna	(Italy) Stefano Gabellini	(Italy) Stefano Gabellini	(Italy) CAAL Racing
8	Adria	Italian	(Italy) Gianni Morbidelli	(Italy) Gianni Morbidelli	(Italy) Roberto Papini	(Italy) CAAL Racing
9	Oschersleben	International	Round cancelled			

== Championship standings ==
=== Campionato Italiano Superstars ===
Pos	Driver	VAL (Italy)	MUG (Italy)	MNZ (Italy)	MAG (Italy)	VNC (Spain)	VAR (Italy)	MIS (Italy)	ADR (Italy)	Pts
1	(Italy) Gianni Morbidelli	**1**^{1}	2^{3}	**2**^{1}	1^{2}	**1**^{1}	3^{3}	3^{3}	**3**^{1}	143
2	(Italy) Stefano Gabellini	2^{2}	**1**^{1}	5	4	8^{2}	2^{2}	1^{2}	5	110
3	(Italy) Giorgio Sanna	10^{3}	5	1^{2}	**2**^{1}	2	Ret	**2**^{1}	2^{2}	100
4	(Italy) Roberto Papini	4	9	DSQ^{3}	3^{3}	3^{3}	8	4	1^{3}	73
5	(Italy) Kristian Ghedina	3	4	3	DNS		5	5	6	56
6	(Italy) Davide Rigon		3^{2}		5	4				32
7	(Italy) Francesco Ascani	7	6	7	6	9	Ret	7	Ret	26
8	(Italy) Luca Rangoni						**1**^{1}			23
9	(Italy) Max Pigoli		Ret	4			4	9	DNS	22
10	(Italy) Leonardo Baccarelli	9	Ret	6	8	7		8	8	21
11	(Italy) Mauro Cesari				9	5	6			16
12	(Colombia) Steven Goldstein	11	Ret	10	7	6	Ret			11
13	(Italy) Agostino Penna								4	10
14	(Italy) Alessandro Battaglin	6	8	11						9
15	(Italy) Andrea Pagliai	5								8
16	(Italy) Simone Campedelli							6		6
17	(Italy) Maurizio Strada		7	9						6
18	(Italy) Marco Baroncini						7			4
19	(Italy) Alessio Alcidi								7	4
20	(Italy) Fabrizio Fede	8								3
21	(Italy) Mauro Simoncini			8						3
22	(Italy) Moreno Petrini		10							1
23	(Italy) Ermanno Dionisio						Ret	10		1
24	(Italy) Alessandro Cicognani		11							0
	(Italy) Maurizio Lusuardi							11		0
	(Italy) Roberto Benedetti	DNS						12	Ret	0
	(Germany) Sascha Bert	Ret								0
	(Italy) Francesco Iorio				Ret					0
	(Italy) Claudio Melotto				DNS		Ret			0
	(Spain) María de Villota					DNS				0
Pos	Driver	VAL (Italy)	MUG (Italy)	MNZ (Italy)	MAG (Italy)	VNC (Spain)	VAR (Italy)	MIS (Italy)	ADR (Italy)	Pts

Colour	Result
Gold	Winner
Silver	Second place
Bronze	Third place
Green	Points classification
Blue	Non-points classification
Blue	Non-classified finish (NC)
Purple	Retired, not classified (Ret)
Red	Did not qualify (DNQ)
Red	Did not pre-qualify (DNPQ)
Black	Disqualified (DSQ)
White	Did not start (DNS)
White	Withdrew (WD)
White	Race cancelled (C)
Blank	Did not practice (DNP)
Blank	Did not arrive (DNA)
Blank	Excluded (EX)

**Bold** – Pole
Italics – Fastest Lap

=== International Superstars Series – Drivers ===
Pos	Driver	VAL (Italy)	MUG (Italy)	MNZ (Italy)	VNC (Spain)	Pts
1	(Italy) Stefano Gabellini	**1**^{1}	**1**^{1}	3^{2}	**6**^{1}	69
2	(Italy) Kristian Ghedina	2^{2}	3	1		49
3	(Italy) Roberto Papini	3	7	**DSQ**^{1}	1^{2}	41
4	(Italy) Davide Rigon		2^{2}		2^{3}	33
5	(Italy) Francesco Ascani	6	4	5	7	28
6	(Italy) Leonardo Baccarelli	8	Ret	4	5	21
7	(Italy) Massimo Pigoli		Ret	2		15
8	(Italy) Alessandro Battaglin	5	6^{3}	9		15
9	(Colombia) Steven Goldstein			8	4	13
10	(Italy) Mauro Cesari				3	12
11	(Italy) Maurizio Strada		5	7		12
12	(Italy) Andrea Pagliai	4^{3}				11
13	(Italy) Mauro Simoncini			6^{3}		7
14	(Italy) Fabrizio Fede	7				4
15	(Italy) Moreno Petrini		8			3
16	(Italy) Alessandro Cicognani		9			2
17	(Italy) Roberto Benedetti	DNS				0
	(Germany) Sascha Bert	Ret				0
	(Spain) María de Villota				DNS	0
Pos	Driver	VAL (Italy)	MUG (Italy)	MNZ (Italy)	VNC (Spain)	Pts

Colour	Result
Gold	Winner
Silver	Second place
Bronze	Third place
Green	Points classification
Blue	Non-points classification
Blue	Non-classified finish (NC)
Purple	Retired, not classified (Ret)
Red	Did not qualify (DNQ)
Red	Did not pre-qualify (DNPQ)
Black	Disqualified (DSQ)
White	Did not start (DNS)
White	Withdrew (WD)
White	Race cancelled (C)
Blank	Did not practice (DNP)
Blank	Did not arrive (DNA)
Blank	Excluded (EX)

**Bold** – Pole
Italics – Fastest Lap

=== International Superstars Series – Teams ===
Position	Team	Points
1	CAAL Racing	157
2	Millenium Team	49
3	Habitat Racing	28
4	Ferlito Motors	19
5	Lanza Motorsport	19
6	Racing4You	16
7	Speedstar Team	15
8	GASS Racing	15
9	Santucci Motorsport	4
10	Maurer Motorsport	0
