= Steven Goldstein (racing driver) =

Colombian racing driver (born 1981)

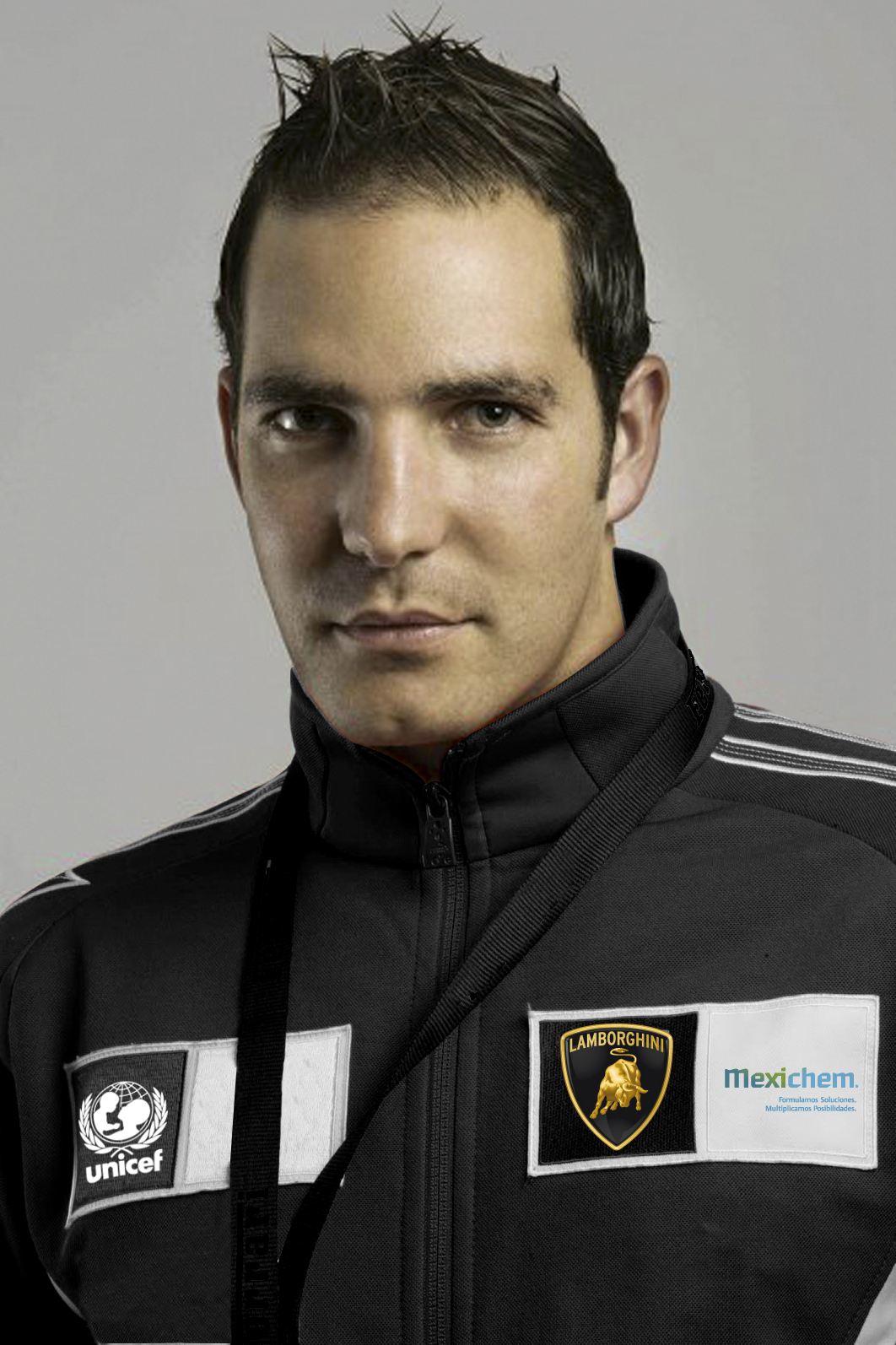
- Nationality: (Colombia) Colombian
- Born: 23 February 1981 (age 45) Bogotá, Colombia
- Categorisation: FIA Silver

Awards
- 2004 2011, 2012, 2013: Formula Dodge Eastern Race Series - Sportsman Division; GTS Cup Trophy

Steven Goldstein (born 23 February 1981) is a Colombian racing driver.

== Racing career ==
In 2004, Goldstein won the Sportsman Division of the Formula Dodge Eastern Race Series in the United States. In 2005, he won a Panoz GT Summer Series race.

In 2006, Goldstein made his debut in the Italian Superstars Championship with an Audi RS4 entered by Audi Sport Italia, finishing eleventh overall after taking part in the last four races; in the following two seasons he raced with the same team, finishing eighth in 2007 and twelfth in 2008, when he missed the final two races.

In 2009, Goldstein took part in the Italian CSAI GT Cup on board a Ferrari 430 entered by the Kessel Racing team. In the same year, he won the 6 Hours of Bogotá on board a Ferrari 430 and a Radical. Driving two separate cars, he won the race in two different categories and finished first and second in the overall ranking.

In 2010, Goldstein raced in the European championship Trofeo Maserati and finished second overall alongside Peter Sundberg.

In 2011, Goldstein competed in the International GT Sprint Series on board a Ferrari 430 with Spanish teammate Antonio de la Reina; they won the GTS Cup Trophy. In 2012, he raced both a Lamborghini Gallardo and a Porsche 997; Goldstein claimed again the trophy, this time by a margin of four points. In 2013, for the third year in a row, he was first in the standings again paired with de la Reina.

In 2014, Goldstein competed in the Italian GT Championship first division on board a Lamborghini Gallardo, finishing second in the Pirelli Tyres Cup standings.

In 2015, there was news that Goldstein was joining the Formula One as test driver for the Force India team.
