= 2006 Superstars Series =

Seasons
- ← 2005 2007 →

The 2006 Superstars Series season was the third season of the Campionato Italiano Superstars (Italian Superstars Championship). The championship was won by Max Pigoli driving for Jaguar.

== Teams and drivers ==
Team	Car	No.	Drivers	Rounds
(Italy) CAAL Racing	BMW M5 (E39)	2	(Italy) Francesco	1, 2
(Italy) CAAL Racing	BMW M5 (E39)	2	(Italy) Giuliano Alessi	3–7
(Italy) CAAL Racing	BMW M5 (E39)	2	(Italy) Marco Gregori	8
(Italy) CAAL Racing	BMW M5 (E39)	3	(Italy) Marco Gregori	1–6
(Italy) CAAL Racing	BMW M5 (E39)	3	(Italy) Fabrizio Armetta	7–8
(Italy) CAAL Racing	BMW 550i (E60)	4	(Italy) Francesco Ascani	3–8
(Italy) Lanza Motorsport	BMW M5 (E39)	5	(Italy) Mauro Simoncini	1–2, 4–5, 8
(Italy) GASS Racing	BMW M5 (E39)	7	(Italy) Alessandro Battaglin	1–5, 7–8
(Italy) GASS Racing	BMW M5 (E39)	7	(Italy) Stanislao Smurra	6
(Italy) Jaguar Dealers Team	Jaguar S-Type R	9	(Italy) Stefano Bonello	1–6, 8
(Italy) Jaguar Dealers Team	Jaguar S-Type R	9	(Italy) Maurizio Flammini	7
(Italy) Jaguar Dealers Team	Jaguar S-Type R	10	(Italy) Max Pigoli	All
(Italy) Giraldi Tecno Sport	BMW M5 (E39)	11	(Italy) Simone Galluzzo	1–5
(Italy) Audi Sport Italia	Audi RS4 (B7)	14	(Colombia) Steven Goldstein	5–8
(Italy) Audi Sport Italia	Audi RS4 (B7)	40	(Italy) Rinaldo Capello	1, 3
(Italy) Audi Sport Italia	Audi RS4 (B7)	40	(Italy) Tamara Vidali	2, 4–8
(Italy) Audi Sport Italia	Audi RS4 (B7)	44	(Italy) Giorgio Sanna	All
(Italy) I motori di Carlotta	BMW M5 (E39)	18	(Italy) Simone Stanguellini	1
(Italy) Santucci Motorsport	BMW M5 (E39)	33	(Italy) Roberto Benedetti	All
(Italy) Santucci Motorsport	BMW M5 (E39)	34	(Italy) Fabrizio Fede	7

== Calendar ==
Round	Circuit/Location	Date
1	(Italy) Adria International Raceway, Adria	April 9
2	(Italy) Autodromo Enzo e Dino Ferrari, Imola	May 7
3	(Italy) Autodromo Vallelunga "Piero Taruffi", Campagnano	June 25
4	(Italy) Autodromo Internazionale del Mugello, Scarperia	July 23
5	(Italy) Autodromo Riccardo Paletti, Varano de' Melegari	September 3
6	(Italy) Autodromo dell'Umbria, Magione	September 17
7	(Italy) Autodromo Vallelunga "Piero Taruffi", Campagnano	October 1
8	(Italy) Circuito Internazionale Santamonica, Misano Adriatico	October 22
