= Minardi M192 =

Formula One racing car

- Category: Formula One
- Constructor: Minardi
- Designer: Aldo Costa
- Predecessor: M191B
- Successor: M193

Technical specifications
- Chassis: Carbon fibre monocoque
- Suspension (front): Double wishbones, pushrod, twin spring/dampers
- Suspension (rear): Double wishbones, pushrod, twin spring/dampers
- Axle track: Front: 1,800 mm (70.9 in); Rear: 1,680 mm (66.1 in)
- Wheelbase: 2,940 mm (115.7 in)
- Engine: Lamborghini LE3512 3,493 cc (213.2 cu in), V12, NA, mid-engine, longitudinally mounted
- Transmission: Lamborghini 6-speed Transverse
- Weight: 505 kg (1,113.3 lb)
- Fuel: Agip
- Lubricants: Agip
- Tyres: Goodyear

Competition history
- Notable entrants: Minardi Team
- Notable drivers: 23. (Brazil) Christian Fittipaldi; 23. (Italy) Alessandro Zanardi; 24. (Italy) Gianni Morbidelli
- Debut: 1992 San Marino Grand Prix
Races	Wins	Poles	F/Laps
11	0	0	0
- Constructors' Championships: 0
- Drivers' Championships: 0

The Minardi M192 was a Formula One car designed by Aldo Costa and built by the Minardi team for the 1992 Formula One season. The car was powered by the Lamborghini V12 engine and ran on Goodyear tyres.

First raced in the San Marino Grand Prix, the M192's best finish was when Christian Fittipaldi drove it to 6th place at the Japanese Grand Prix. This earned Minardi its first and only point of the season.

== Design and development ==
Following the 1991 season, in which Minardi scored six points for seventh place in the Constructor's Championship, a number of changes were implemented. In particular, the expensive Ferrari V12s it had used had been replaced with a supply of Lamborghini 3512 V12 engines for 1992. This change saved the team around 20% in its expenditure on engines, but the V12 weighed in at a heavy 145 kilograms (320 lb). It had a capacity of 3,493 cubic centimetres (213.2 cu in) and was rated as having 730 brake horsepower. From the Italian Grand Prix, the team received uprated 'B' specification engines. In addition to securing the use of the Lamborghini V12, Minardi was also provided with the manufacturer's 6-speed transverse gearbox.

Designed by Aldo Costa, with aerodynamic input from Rene Hilhorst, the M192 was intended to have a stiffer chassis than the M191. The monocoque chassis was of carbon fibre and configured with double wishbone pushrod suspension having twin Koni springs, front and rear. The front dampers were externally mounted, which allowed them to be more easily adjusted as the need arose. Brakes were by Brembo. The steering was of a Minardi design and the car ran on Goodyear tyres. Its wheelbase was 2,940 millimetres (115.7 in), the front track was 1,800 millimetres (70.9 in) while the rear track was 1,680 millimetres (66.1 in). The capacity of the fuel tank was 220 litres (48.4 imp gal) and fuel and oil was supplied by Agip. The overall weight of the car was 505 kilograms (1,113.3 lb).

Sponsorship was provided by a variety of companies, and included SCM, Sabiem, Resta, AST, IBF, Calcestruzzi and CIFA. The car was presented in a largely black colour scheme, with bands of white and yellow.

Some aerodynamic components from the previous year's car, the M191, were carried over to the M192. However, partway through the year, Minardi identified errors in its wind tunnel data which had to be rectified. For financial reasons, there was limited development through the course of the year. The M192 was noted for suffering understeer. When Gustav Brunner joined the team towards the end of the season, he introduced detail changes which improved the car's handling.

== Race history ==
The drivers for 1992 were Gianni Morbidelli, continuing on from the previous year, and Christian Fittipaldi, who had won the Formula 3000 Championship in 1991. The team started the year with an interim car, the M191B, which had been modified to take the Lamborghini engines. Its best finish was Morbidelli's seventh place at the Brazilian Grand Prix.

The M192 was first used at the Spanish Grand Prix but only in practice, by Morbidelli who drove the M191B in qualifying and the race. The new car was first used competitively at the fifth race of the year, the San Marino Grand Prix, the team bringing two chassis for its drivers. A M191B was also present as the spare car. Both drivers retired in the race with transmission issues, having qualified 21st (Morbidelli) and 25th (Fittipaldi).

At the next race, in Monaco, Fittipaldi finished in 8th, having qualified in 17th. Morbidelli retired after lap 1; he had qualified in 12th but had to start the race from the pit lane. He finished the next race, in Canada, in 11th having been involved in a collision with Michele Alboreto's Footwork FA13. Fittipaldi retired from 13th late in the race with gearbox issues. At the French Grand Prix Fittipaldi suffered major back injuries following a crash in practice, leaving the team to run a single entry for Morbidelli in the race. He qualified in 16th and went on to finish 8th in the race, a lap down on the winner.

Fittipaldi had injured his spine sufficiently to put him out for the next three races. He was replaced by Alessandro Zanardi, who failed to qualify for the British Grand Prix. Morbidelli qualified 25th and finished 17th in the race although he was not running at the end. At the German Grand Prix, Zanardi qualified in 24th ahead of Mordidelli who was in the 26th and last spot on the grid. The drivers complained about the relative lack of speed on the low drag circuit and had to run low downforce settings in an attempt to make up straightline speed. In the race, Zanardi retired on lap 2 with gearbox problems while Morbidelli finished in 12th, one lap down. At the following race in Hungary, neither driver qualified. It was Zanardi's final appearance for the team.

Fittipaldi returned for the Belgian Grand Prix but failed to qualify. Morbidelli did make the starting grid, in 16th, but after a heavy accident in qualifying. He used the spare car for the race, in which he finished in 16th place. The team implemented aerodynamic changes for the Italian Grand Prix, but this did not help Fittipaldi who failed to qualify again. Morbidelli fared better, placing 12th on the grid. He was running in this position in the early stages of the race when he retired with a crankshaft failure. Fittipaldi later conceded that his return to racing was premature and affected his performance.

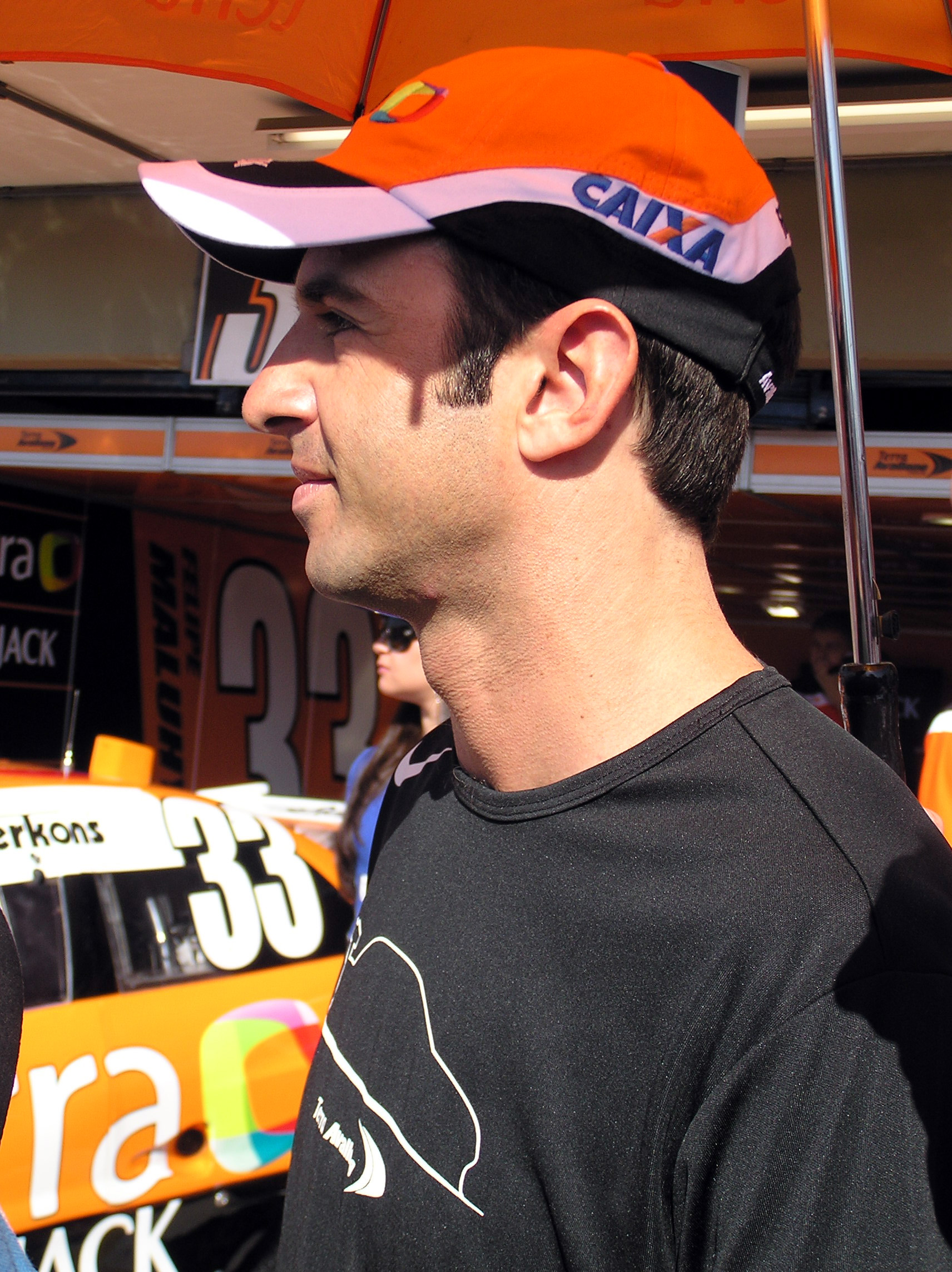
Minardi driver Christian Fittipaldi, who secured the best finish with the M192; photograph taken in 2006

At the last race in Europe, in Portugal, Minardi was able to qualify both cars, with Fittipaldi in last place and Morbidelli in 18th. Both drivers finished as well, although three laps down; Fittipaldi in 12th place and Morbidelli in 14th. In the Japanese Grand Prix, Fittipaldi finished 6th from 12th on the grid, gaining Minardi its first and only point of the season. For much of the race he had battled with Ferrari driver Jean Alesi. Morbidelli started and finished the race in 14th position. The final race of the 1992 season was in Australia, where the M192 was qualified in 16th and 17th on the grid, Morbidelli ahead of Fittipaldi. Both cars finished, Fittipaldi in 9th and closely hounding Aguri Suzuki in the Footwork by the end of the race, while Morbidelli, having run as high as 8th at one stage, was placed 10th.

Fittpaldi placed equal 17th in the 1992 Driver's Championship while the team's single point saw it finish joint 11th in the Constructor's Championship, alongside Jordan and Venturi Larrousse, the latter also using the Lamborghini engine.

== Complete Formula One results ==
(key) (results in bold indicate pole position; results in italics indicate fastest lap)

Year	Chassis	Engine(s)	Tyres	Drivers	1	2	3	4	5	6	7	8	9	10	11	12	13	14	15	16	Points	WCC
1992	Minardi M192	Lamborghini V12	**G**		RSA	MEX	BRA	ESP	SMR	MON	CAN	FRA	GBR	GER	HUN	BEL	ITA	POR	JPN	AUS	**1**	**11th=**
1992	Minardi M192	Lamborghini V12	**G**	Christian Fittipaldi					Ret	8	13	DNQ				DNQ	DNQ	12	6	9	**1**	**11th=**
1992	Minardi M192	Lamborghini V12	**G**	Alessandro Zanardi									DNQ	Ret	DNQ						**1**	**11th=**
1992	Minardi M192	Lamborghini V12	**G**	Gianni Morbidelli					Ret	Ret	11	8	Ret	12	DNQ	16	Ret	14	14	10	**1**	**11th=**
