= 2007 Superstars Series =

Seasons
- ← 2006 2008 →

The 2007 Superstars Series season was the fourth season of the Campionato Italiano Superstars (Italian Superstars Championship) and the inaugural season of the International Superstars Series. The Italian championship was won by Gianni Morbidelli driving for Audi, while the international series was won by Giuliano Alessi driving for BMW.

== Teams and drivers ==
Team	Car	No.	Drivers	Rounds
(Italy) Jaguar Dealers Team	Jaguar S-Type R	1	(Italy) Max Pigoli	All
(Italy) Jaguar Dealers Team	Jaguar S-Type R	2	(Italy) Alessandro Balzan	All
(Italy) Audi Sport Italia	Audi RS4 (B7)	4	(Colombia) Steven Goldstein	All
(Italy) Audi Sport Italia	Audi RS4 (B7)	44	(Italy) Giorgio Sanna	All
(Italy) Audi Sport Italia	Audi RS4 (B7)	45	(Italy) Gianni Morbidelli	All
(Italy) Audi Sport Italia	Audi RS4 (B7)	46	(Italy) Massimiliano Venturi	4
(Italy) Audi Sport Italia	Audi RS4 (B7)	46	(Italy) Rinaldo Capello	6
(Italy) Lanza Motorsport	BMW M5 (E39)	5	(Italy) Maurizio Strada	2, 8
(Italy) Lanza Motorsport	BMW M5 (E39)	5	(Italy) Mauro Simoncini	5–6
(Italy) Lanza Motorsport	BMW M5 (E39)	6	(Italy) Mauro Simoncini	8
(Italy) Lanza Motorsport	BMW M5 (E39)	6	(Italy) Arturo Merzario	2
(Italy) GASS Racing	BMW M5 (E39)	7	(Italy) Alessandro Battaglin	1–4, 6–8
(Italy) GDL Racing	BMW 550i (E60)	11	(Italy) Francesco Ascani	All
(Italy) GDL Racing	BMW 550i (E60)	69	(Italy) Kristian Ghedina	All
(Italy) CAAL Racing	BMW M5 (E39)	19	(Italy) Marco Gregori	4, 7
(Italy) CAAL Racing	BMW M5 (E39)	19	(Italy) Romano Fortunati	5
(Italy) CAAL Racing	BMW M5 (E39)	19	(Italy) Corrado Canneori	6
(Italy) CAAL Racing	BMW M5 (E39)	19	(Italy) Stefano Bonello	6
(Italy) CAAL Racing	BMW M5 (E39)	19	(Italy) Sergio Fiorelli	8
(Italy) CAAL Racing	BMW 550i (E60)	54	(Italy) Giuliano Alessi	All
(Italy) CAAL Racing	BMW M5 (E39)	56	(Italy) Moreno Petrini	1–6, 8
(Italy) CAAL Racing	BMW M5 (E39)	56	(Italy) Gianni Martellucci	7
(Italy) CAAL Racing	BMW M5 (E39)	58	(Italy) Romano Fortunati	1, 3
(Italy) CAAL Racing	BMW M5 (E39)	58	(Italy) Marco Gregori	2
(Italy) CAAL Racing	BMW M5 (E39)	58	(Italy) Leonardo Baccarelli	4, 7–8
(Italy) CAAL Racing	BMW M5 (E39)	58	(Italy) Ivan Tramontozzi	6
(Italy) Santucci Motorsport	BMW M5 (E39)	33	(Italy) Roberto Benedetti	1, 3–4, 6–8

- Audi Sport Italia and its drivers entered only the Italian Championship.

== Calendar ==
Round	Circuit/Location	Date
1	(Italy) Adria International Raceway, Adria	April 1
2	(Italy) Autodromo Nazionale di Monza, Monza	April 15
3	(Italy) Autodromo dell'Umbria, Magione	May 20
4	(Italy) Misano World Circuit, Misano Adriatico	July 15
5	(Germany) Nürburgring, Nürburg	August 26
6	(Italy) Adria International Raceway, Adria	September 9
7	(Italy) Autodromo Vallelunga "Piero Taruffi", Campagnano	September 16
8	(Italy) Autodromo Nazionale di Monza, Monza	October 21

Campionato Italiano Superstars only
Both championships

== Scoring system ==
Point system for qualifying
Position	1st	2nd	3rd
Points	3	2	1

Points system for raace
1st	2nd	3rd	4th	5th	6th	7th	8th	9th	10th
20	15	12	10	8	6	4	3	2	1

== Results ==
Round	Circuit	Series	Pole position	Fastest lap	Winning driver	Winning team
1	Adria	Italian	(Italy) Alessandro Balzan	(Italy) Alessandro Balzan	(Italy) Alessandro Balzan	(Italy) Jaguar Dealers Team
2	Monza	Italian	(Italy) Alessandro Balzan	(Italy) Gianni Morbidelli	(Italy) Max Pigoli	(Italy) Jaguar Dealers Team
2	Monza	International	(Italy) Alessandro Balzan		(Italy) Max Pigoli	(Italy) Jaguar Dealers Team
3	Magione	Italian	(Italy) Gianni Morbidelli	(Italy) Gianni Morbidelli	(Italy) Gianni Morbidelli	(Italy) Audi Sport Italia
4	Misano Adriatico	Italian	(Italy) Gianni Morbidelli	(Italy) Gianni Morbidelli	(Italy) Gianni Morbidelli	(Italy) Audi Sport Italia
5	Nürburgring	Italian	(Italy) Gianni Morbidelli	(Italy) Gianni Morbidelli	(Italy) Gianni Morbidelli	(Italy) Audi Sport Italia
5	Nürburgring	International	(Italy) Giuliano Alessi	(Italy) Kristian Ghedina	(Italy) Alessandro Balzan	(Italy) Jaguar Dealers Team
6	Adria	Italian	(Italy) Dindo Capello	(Italy) Dindo Capello	(Italy) Gianni Morbidelli	(Italy) Audi Sport Italia
6	Adria	International	(Italy) Giuliano Alessi	(Italy) Giuliano Alessi	(Italy) Giuliano Alessi	(Italy) CAAL Racing
7	Vallelunga	Italian	(Italy) Gianni Morbidelli	(Italy) Giorgio Sanna	(Italy) Gianni Morbidelli	(Italy) Audi Sport Italia
7	Vallelunga	International	(Italy) Kristian Ghedina	(Italy) Kristian Ghedina	(Italy) Giuliano Alessi	(Italy) CAAL Racing
8	Monza	Italian	(Italy) Gianni Morbidelli	(Italy) Gianni Morbidelli	(Italy) Gianni Morbidelli	(Italy) Audi Sport Italia

== Championship standings ==
=== Campionato Italiano Superstars – Drivers ===
Pos	Driver	ADR (Italy)	MNZ (Italy)	MAG (Italy)	MIS (Italy)	NUR (Germany)	ADR (Italy)	VAL (Italy)	MNZ (Italy)	Pts
1	(Italy) Gianni Morbidelli	DNS	Ret	**1**^{1}	**1**^{1}	**1**^{1}	1^{2}	**1**^{1}	**1**^{1}	137
2	(Italy) Alessandro Balzan	**1**^{1}	**Ret**^{1}	4^{3}	11^{3}	3	5	4	2^{2}	85
3	(Italy) Giorgio Sanna	DNS^{3}	6^{2}	2^{2}	3	2^{2}	DNS	12^{2}	4	67
4	(Italy) Giuliano Alessi	Ret	3	3	Ret^{2}	4^{3}	3^{3}	2	Ret^{3}	66
5	(Italy) Max Pigoli	2^{2}	1^{3}	5	6	5	Ret	13	Ret	60
6	(Italy) Alessandro Battaglin	4	2	8	DNS		4	5	3	58
7	(Italy) Kristian Ghedina	3	7	7	2	10	9	3^{3}	Ret	51
8	(Colombia) Steven Goldstein	DNS	4	6	7	11	6	11	DSQ	26
9	(Italy) Roberto Benedetti	Ret		Ret	5		10	9	5	19
10	(Italy) Francesco Ascani	DNS	8	Ret	8	7	Ret	8	6	19
11	(Italy) Rinaldo Capello						**2**^{1}			18
12	(Italy) Moreno Petrini	6	Ret	9	9	6	Ret		Ret	16
13	(Italy) Marco Gregori		5		10			6		15
14	(Italy) Romano Fortunati	5		DNS		8				11
15	(Italy) Massimiliano Venturi				4					10
16	(Italy) Mauro Simoncini					9	7		7	10
17	(Italy) Leonardo Baccarelli				DNS			7	Ret	4
18	(Italy) Maurizio Strada		Ret						8	3
19	(Italy) Corrado Canneori						8			3
20	(Italy) Gianni Martellucci							10		1
21	(Italy) Ivan Tramontozzi						Ret			0
	(Italy) Arturo Merzario		Ret							0
	(Italy) Sergio Fiorelli								DNS	0
	(Italy) Stefano Bonello						DNS			0
Pos	Driver	ADR (Italy)	MNZ (Italy)	MAG (Italy)	MIS (Italy)	NUR (Germany)	ADR (Italy)	VAL (Italy)	MNZ (Italy)	Pts

Colour	Result
Gold	Winner
Silver	Second place
Bronze	Third place
Green	Points classification
Blue	Non-points classification
Blue	Non-classified finish (NC)
Purple	Retired, not classified (Ret)
Red	Did not qualify (DNQ)
Red	Did not pre-qualify (DNPQ)
Black	Disqualified (DSQ)
White	Did not start (DNS)
White	Withdrew (WD)
White	Race cancelled (C)
Blank	Did not practice (DNP)
Blank	Did not arrive (DNA)
Blank	Excluded (EX)

**Bold** – Pole
Italics – Fastest Lap

=== International Superstars Series – Drivers ===
Pos	Driver	MNZ (Italy)	NUR (Germany)	ADR (Italy)	VAL (Italy)	Pts
1	(Italy) Giuliano Alessi	3	**2**^{1}	**1**^{1}	1^{2}	75
2	(Italy) Alessandro Balzan	**Ret**^{1}	1^{3}	3	3^{3}	49
3	(Italy) Alessandro Battaglin	2^{3}		2	4	41
4	(Italy) Kristian Ghedina	5	8^{2}	6^{2}	**2**^{1}	39
5	(Italy) Max Pigoli	1^{2}	3	Ret	10	35
6	(Italy) Marco Gregori	4			5	18
7	(Italy) Francesco Ascani	6	5	Ret	7	18
8	(Italy) Mauro Simoncini		7	4		14
9	(Italy) Moreno Petrini	Ret	4	Ret		10
10	(Italy) Corrado Canneori			5		8
11	(Italy) Roberto Benedetti			7	8	7
12	(Italy) Romano Fortunati		6			6
13	(Italy) Leonardo Baccarelli				6	6
14	(Italy) Gianni Martellucci				9	2
15	(Italy) Ivan Tramontozzi			Ret^{3}		1
16	(Italy) Maurizio Strada	Ret				0
	(Italy) Arturo Merzario	Ret				0
	(Italy) Stefano Bonello			DNS		0
Pos	Driver	MNZ (Italy)	NUR (Germany)	ADR (Italy)	VAL (Italy)	Pts

Colour	Result
Gold	Winner
Silver	Second place
Bronze	Third place
Green	Points classification
Blue	Non-points classification
Blue	Non-classified finish (NC)
Purple	Retired, not classified (Ret)
Red	Did not qualify (DNQ)
Red	Did not pre-qualify (DNPQ)
Black	Disqualified (DSQ)
White	Did not start (DNS)
White	Withdrew (WD)
White	Race cancelled (C)
Blank	Did not practice (DNP)
Blank	Did not arrive (DNA)
Blank	Excluded (EX)

**Bold** – Pole

=== International Superstars Series – Teams ===
Position	Team	Points
1	CAAL Racing	126
2	Jaguar Dealers Team	84
3	GDL Racing	57
4	GASS Racing	41
5	Lanza Motorsport	14
6	Santucci Motorsport	7
