= Minardi M191 =

Formula One racing car

Minardi M191 Minardi M191B
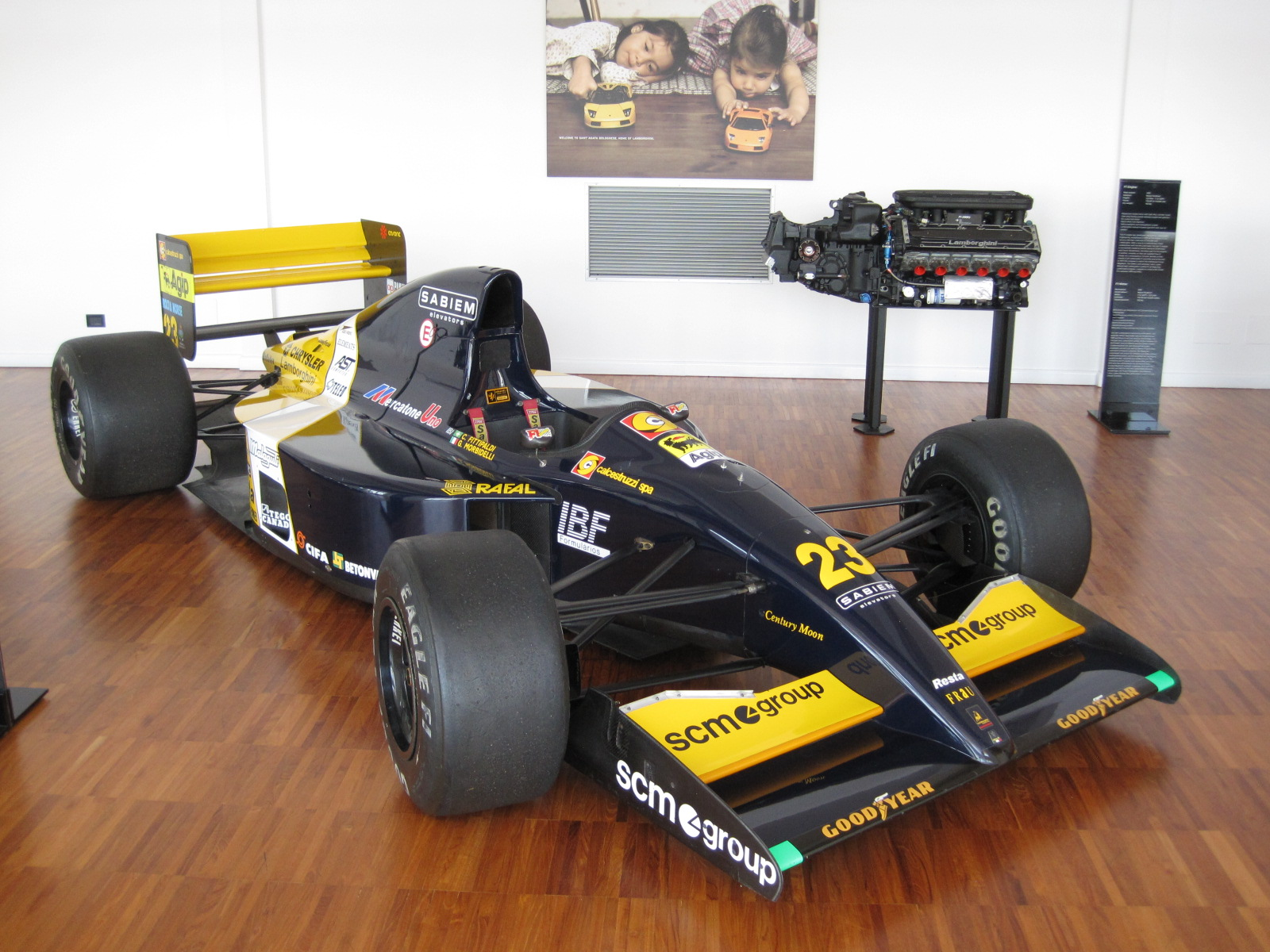
- Category: Formula One
- Constructor: Minardi
- Designers: Aldo Costa (Technical Director); Rene Hilhorst (Head of Aerodynamics)
- Predecessor: M190
- Successor: M192

Technical specifications
- Chassis: Carbon fibre monocoque
- Axle track: Front: 1,800 mm (70.9 in); Rear: 1,640 mm (64.6 in)
- Wheelbase: 2,990 mm (117.7 in)
- Engine: 1991: Ferrari Tipo 037, 65° V12, 3,493 cc (213.2 cu in), NA, mid-engine, longitudinally mounted. 1992: Lamborghini LE3512, 80° V12, 3,493 cc (213.2 cu in), NA, mid-engine, longitudinally mounted.
- Transmission: Minardi 6-speed
- Weight: 505 kg (1,113.3 lb)
- Fuel: Agip
- Tyres: Goodyear

Competition history
- Notable entrants: Minardi Team
- Notable drivers: 23. (Italy) Pierluigi Martini; 23. (Brazil) Christian Fittipaldi; 24. (Italy) Gianni Morbidelli; 24. (Brazil) Roberto Moreno
- Debut: 1991 United States Grand Prix
Races	Wins	Poles	F/Laps
20	0	0	0
- Constructors' Championships: 0
- Drivers' Championships: 0

The Minardi M191 was a Formula One car designed by Aldo Costa and Rene Hilhorst for the Minardi team.

The original M191 was powered by a Ferrari V12 engine, and was used in the 1991 Formula One World Championship. It was driven by Italians Pierluigi Martini and Gianni Morbidelli, with Brazilian Roberto Moreno replacing Morbidelli at the final race of the year in Australia. Its best finishes were two fourth places for Martini in San Marino and Portugal.

An updated version of the car, the M191B, was powered by a Lamborghini V12 engine and used in the first four races of the 1992 Championship, driven by Morbidelli and Brazilian debutant Christian Fittipaldi.

== Development ==
For the 1991 season, team owner Giancarlo Minardi arranged a supply of Ferrari V12 engines to replace the Cosworth V8s that it had used since 1988. However, the new engines, designated 036, were actually those used by Ferrari during the 1989 season and had not received any further development. Later in the season, Minardi received 037 specification engines, which were those from Ferrari's 1990 car.

The chassis was designed by Aldo Costa with Rene Hilhorst providing aerodynamic input.

== Race history ==
=== 1991 ===
The M191 debuted in the 1991 United States Grand Prix, driven by Italians Pierluigi Martini and Gianni Morbidelli. Martini, a longtime stalwart of Minardi, scored all the points scoring finishes for the team in 1991, finishing fourth at the San Marino Grand Prix and repeating the feat in Portugal. This meant a finish of 7th place in the Constructors' Championship, the best placing Minardi achieved in the course of its history.

Despite qualifying well on occasion (with a best of 8th place on the grid in San Marino and Japan), Morbidelli failed to score any points. His best finish was 7th at the Mexican race. He was promoted to the Ferrari race team following the sacking of Alain Prost after the Japanese Grand Prix and was replaced by Brazilian Roberto Moreno for the last race of the year in Australia. Moreno placed 16th in that race.

=== 1992 ===
The team used an updated M191, designated the M191B, for the first four races of the 1992 season before it was replaced by the Minardi M192. With it, Morbidelli, back in the team after his one-off drive for Ferrari at the tail end of the previous season, finished 7th at the Brazilian Grand Prix. It was his only finish with the M191B. New recruit Christian Fittipaldi likewise only had one finish with the M191B, 11th at the Spanish race.

== Livery ==
The M191 featured a mostly blue livery, with stripes in yellow and white and sponsorship from SCM Group, among other companies.

== Complete Formula One results ==
(key)

Year	Entrant	Chassis	Engine	Tyres	Drivers	1	2	3	4	5	6	7	8	9	10	11	12	13	14	15	16	Pts.	WCC
1991	Minardi Team	M191	Ferrari 037 V12	G		USA	BRA	SMR	MON	CAN	MEX	FRA	GBR	GER	HUN	BEL	ITA	POR	ESP	JPN	AUS	6	7th
1991	Minardi Team	M191	Ferrari 037 V12	G	(Italy) Pierluigi Martini	9	Ret	4	12	7	Ret	9	9	Ret	Ret	12	Ret	4	12	Ret	Ret	6	7th
1991	Minardi Team	M191	Ferrari 037 V12	G	(Italy) Gianni Morbidelli	Ret	8	Ret	Ret	Ret	7	Ret	11	Ret	13	Ret	9	9	Ret	Ret		6	7th
1991	Minardi Team	M191	Ferrari 037 V12	G	(Brazil) Roberto Moreno																16	6	7th
1992	Minardi Team	M191B	Lamborghini 3512 V12	G		RSA	MEX	BRA	ESP	SMR	MON	CAN	FRA	GBR	GER	HUN	BEL	ITA	POR	JPN	AUS	1*	12th*
1992	Minardi Team	M191B	Lamborghini 3512 V12	G	(Brazil) Christian Fittipaldi	Ret	Ret	Ret	11													1*	12th*
1992	Minardi Team	M191B	Lamborghini 3512 V12	G	(Italy) Gianni Morbidelli	Ret	Ret	7	Ret													1*	12th*

* Point scored using the M192.
