= Jens Hellström =

Swedish racing driver (born 1977)

Jan Jens Hellström (born 9 August 1977 in Järfalla, Uppland) is a Swedish auto racing driver.

== Career ==
He has raced mainly in touring cars, including the Swedish Touring Car Championship and the Swedish Volvo S40 Challenge. His last campaign in the STCC was in 2005, driving a Honda Civic Type R for Engström Motorsport. Also that year, he competed in the first two rounds of the inaugural FIA World Touring Car Championship season at Monza. He finished twenty-sixth in race one, and twenty-first in the second race.

== Racing record ==
=== Complete World Touring Car Championship results ===
(key) (Races in bold indicate pole position) (Races in italics indicate fastest lap)

Year	Team	Car	1	2	3	4	5	6	7	8	9	10	11	12	13	14	15	16	17	18	19	20	21	22	DC	Points
2005	Honda Dealer Team Sweden	Honda Civic Type-R	ITA; 1; 26	ITA; 2; 21	FRA; 1	FRA; 2	GBR; 1	GBR; 2	SMR; 1	SMR; 2	MEX; 1	MEX; 2	BEL; 1	BEL; 2	GER; 1	GER; 2	TUR; 1	TUR; 2	ESP; 1	ESP; 2	MAC; 1	MAC; 2			NC	0
