= Tomas Engström =

Swedish racing driver

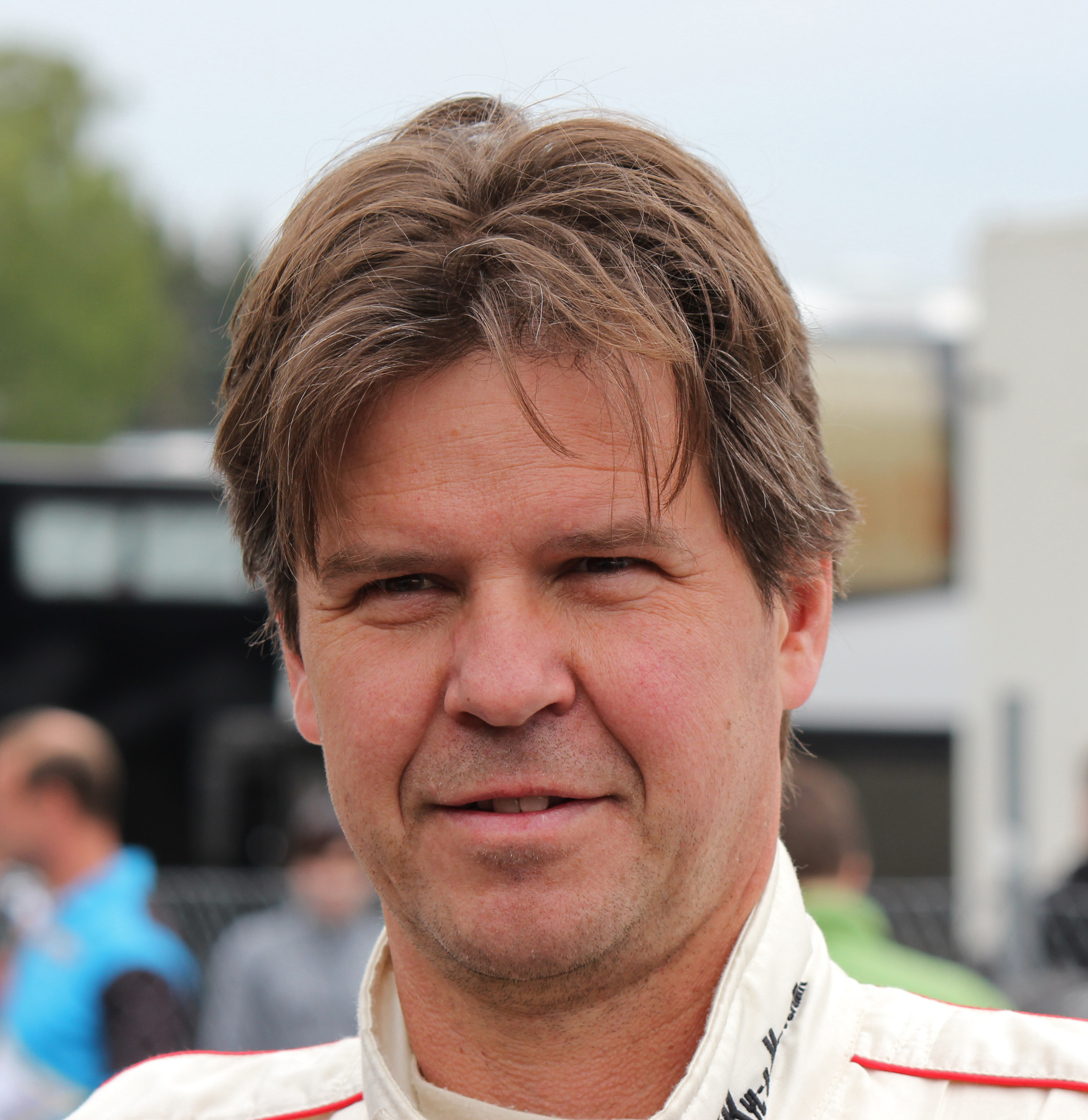
Tomas Engström in 2012

Leif Tomas Engström (born 18 January 1964) is a Swedish auto racing driver. He is married with four children. In the 1990s, he dominated the Swedish Camaro Cup, winning five back-to-back titles between 1994 and 1998. Since then, he has mainly competed in touring cars, driving in the Swedish Touring Car Championship since 1999, when he entered an independent Chrysler Stratus. After this, he managed and drove for the Honda Racing Team in a Honda Accord, with his best season for the team coming in 2003, when he finished third overall. Also in 2003, he competed in four rounds of the European Touring Car Championship. In 2007, he was runner-up in the S2000 Class of the European Touring Car Cup.

In 2007, Engström entered two rounds of the FIA World Touring Car Championship at Monza, finishing as top independent in race one.

In 2008, Engström finished eighth in the STCC, driving alongside third place Thed Björk. He will continue to drive for Engström Motorsport Honda, in the 2009 STCC season.

== Racing record ==
=== Complete World Touring Car Championship results ===
(key) (Races in bold indicate pole position) (Races in italics indicate the fastest lap)

Year	Team	Car	1	2	3	4	5	6	7	8	9	10	11	12	13	14	15	16	17	18	19	20	21	22	DC	Points
2005	Honda Dealer Team Sweden	Honda Accord Euro R	ITA; 1; 14	ITA; 2; 23	FRA; 1	FRA; 2	GBR; 1	GBR; 2	SMR; 1	SMR; 2	MEX; 1	MEX; 2	BEL; 1	BEL; 2	GER; 1	GER; 2	TUR; 1	TUR; 2	ESP; 1; 13	ESP; 2; 9	MAC; 1	MAC; 2			NC	0
2007	Honda Dealer Team Sweden	Honda Accord Euro R	BRA; 1	BRA; 2	NED; 1	NED; 2	ESP; 1	ESP; 2	FRA; 1	FRA; 2	CZE; 1	CZE; 2	POR; 1	POR; 2	SWE; 1	SWE; 2	GER; 1	GER; 2	GBR; 1	GBR; 2	ITA; 1; 15	ITA; 2; 16	MAC; 1	MAC; 2	NC	0

=== Complete TCR International Series results ===
(key) (Races in bold indicate pole position) (Races in italics indicate fastest lap)

Year	Team	Car	1	2	3	4	5	6	7	8	9	10	11	12	13	14	15	16	17	18	19	20	21	22	DC	Points
2015	Liqui Moly Team Engstler	SEAT León Cup Racer	MYS; 1	MYS; 2	CHN; 1	CHN; 2	ESP; 1	ESP; 2	POR; 1	POR; 2	ITA; 1	ITA; 2	AUT; 1	AUT; 2	RUS; 1; 10	RUS; 2; 8	RBR; 1	RBR; 2							17th	21
2015	Liqui Moly Team Engstler	Volkswagen Golf TCR																	SIN; 1; 12	**SIN**; **2**; 9	THA; 1; 8	THA; 2; 6	MAC; 1	MAC; 2	17th	21
