= Carlos Mastretta Aguilera =

Mexican racing driver

Carlos Mastretta Aguilera (born 26 January 1984) is a Mexican auto racing driver. His early racing career saw him compete in Formula Renault in Mexico and the United Kingdom. In 2005 he entered two rounds of the FIA World Touring Car Championship for GR Asia in a SEAT Toledo, with a best placed finish of fifteenth in his home race at Puebla. Mastretta went on to race in the 2006 Champ Car Atlantic Series, for five races, with a best result of sixth in Cleveland, OH.

== Racing record ==
=== Complete World Touring Car Championship results ===
(key) (Races in bold indicate pole position) (Races in italics indicate fastest lap)

Year	Team	Car	1	2	3	4	5	6	7	8	9	10	11	12	13	14	15	16	17	18	19	20	DC	Points
2005	GR Asia	SEAT Toledo Cupra	ITA; 1	ITA; 2	FRA; 1	FRA; 2	GBR; 1	GBR; 2	SMR; 1; 25	SMR; 2; 18	MEX; 1; 15	MEX; 2; 17	BEL; 1	BEL; 2	GER; 1	GER; 2	TUR; 1	TUR; 2	ESP; 1	ESP; 2	MAC; 1	MAC; 2	NC	0
