= Sascha Plöderl =

Austrian auto racing driver (born 1973)

Sascha Plöderl (born 1 January 1973) is an Austrian auto racing driver, best known for competing in five rounds of the 2005 FIA World Touring Car Championship. He drove a Ford Focus ST170 for the independent RS-Line IPZ Racing Team. His best finish was a twenty-second place at Oschersleben.

Previous racing included drives in the 1999 Austrian Formula Ford Season, the Austrian Touring Car Championship between 2001 and 2003, and he also raced in the German Renault Clio Cup in 2004. After the WTCC he has competed in rally events for IPZ in a Mitsubishi Lancer Evolution. Plöderl has also raced in the ADAC Procar Series.

== Racing record ==
=== Complete World Touring Car Championship results ===
(key) (Races in bold indicate pole position) (Races in italics indicate fastest lap)

Year	Team	Car	1	2	3	4	5	6	7	8	9	10	11	12	13	14	15	16	17	18	19	20	DC	Points
2005	RS-Line IPZ Racing	Ford Focus ST170	ITA; 1	ITA; 2	FRA; 1 NC	FRA; 2; 25	GBR; 1	GBR; 2	SMR; 1 Ret	SMR; 2 DNS	MEX; 1	MEX; 2	BEL; 1	BEL; 2	GER; 1; 25	GER; 2; 22	TUR; 1	TUR; 2	ESP; 1	ESP; 2	MAC; 1	MAC; 2	NC	0
