= 2005 World Touring Car Championship =

Motorsport contest

Champions
- World Drivers' Champion: Andy Priaulx
- World Manufacturers' Champion: BMW

Seasons
- ← 1987 (WTCC); 2004 (ETCC) 2006 →

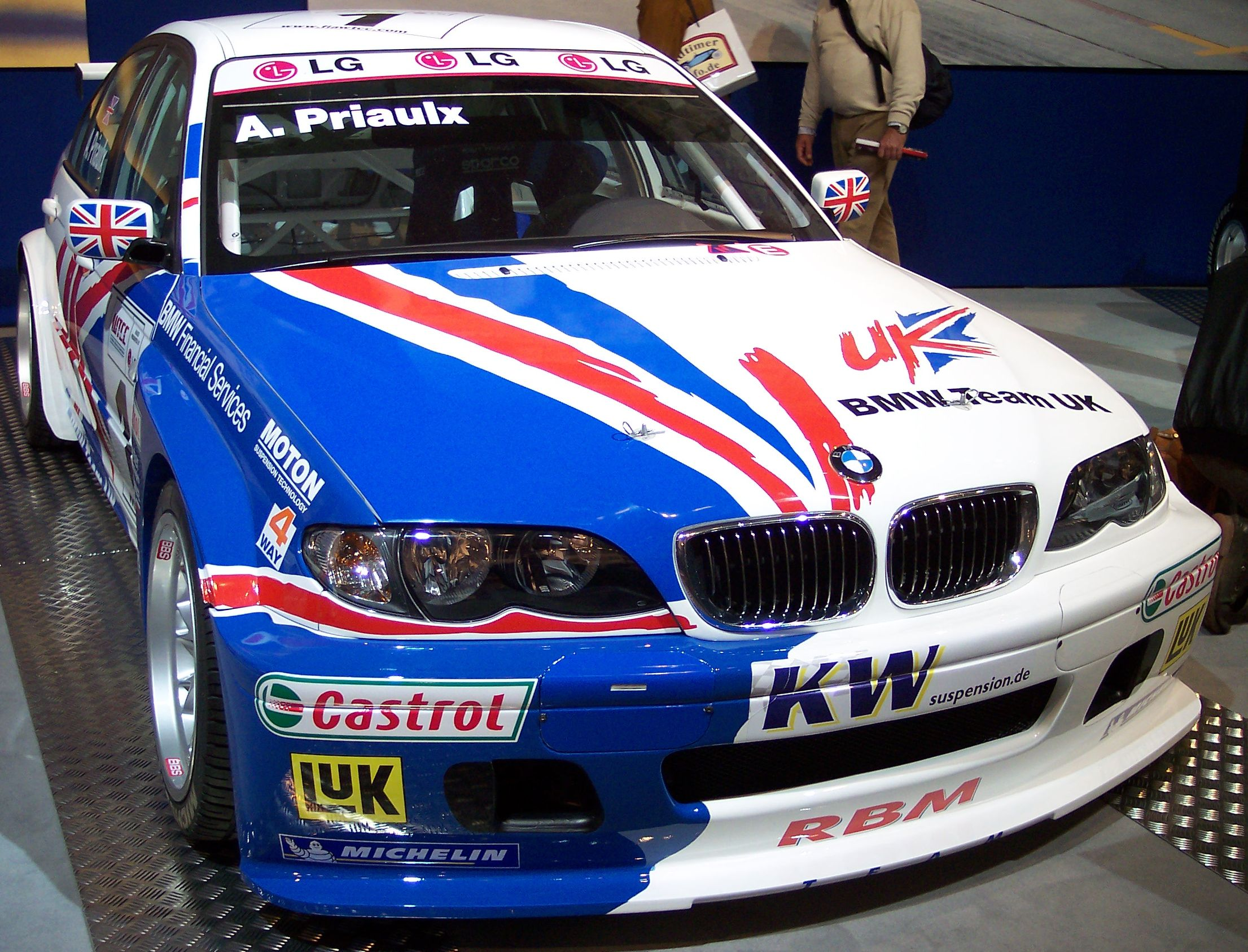
Andy Priaulx won the Drivers' Championship at the wheel of a BMW 320i

The 2005 World Touring Car Championship was the second season of World Touring Car Championship motor racing, and the first since 1987. It featured the 2005 FIA World Touring Car Championship which was contested over a ten event, twenty race series which commenced on 10 April and ended on 20 November. The championship was open to Super 2000 cars, Diesel 2000 cars and Super Production cars as defined by the FIA. Andy Priaulx won the Drivers' Championship and BMW won the Manufacturers' title.

Organised by KSO, a subsidiary of Eurosport, the championship was an evolution of the former European Touring Car Championship, elevated to World Championship status by the FIA for 2005 with the introduction of races outside Europe. The European title was given to the new European Touring Car Cup, a one-off event.

== Teams and drivers ==
According to 2005 Entry List.

Team	Car	No.	Drivers	Rounds
Manufacturer Teams
(United Kingdom) BMW Team UK	BMW 320i	1	(United Kingdom) Andy Priaulx	All
BMW Team Italy-Spain	BMW 320i	4	(Italy) Alessandro Zanardi	All
BMW Team Italy-Spain	BMW 320i	5	(Spain) Antonio García	All
(Netherlands) BMW Team Holland	BMW 320i	41	(Netherlands) Duncan Huisman	10
(Germany) BMW Team Deutschland	BMW 320i	42	(Germany) Jörg Müller	All
(Germany) BMW Team Deutschland	BMW 320i	43	(Germany) Dirk Müller	All
(Italy) Alfa Romeo Racing Team	Alfa Romeo 156	2	(Italy) Gabriele Tarquini	All
(Italy) Alfa Romeo Racing Team	Alfa Romeo 156	3	(United Kingdom) James Thompson	All
(Italy) Alfa Romeo Racing Team	Alfa Romeo 156	6	(Italy) Fabrizio Giovanardi	All
(Italy) Alfa Romeo Racing Team	Alfa Romeo 156	7	(Brazil) Augusto Farfus	All
(Italy) Alfa Romeo Racing Team	Alfa Romeo 156	56	(Macau) André Couto	10
(Spain) SEAT Sport	SEAT Toledo Cupra	8	(Sweden) Rickard Rydell	1–8
(Spain) SEAT Sport	SEAT León	8	(Sweden) Rickard Rydell	9–10
(Spain) SEAT Sport	SEAT Toledo Cupra	9	(Spain) Jordi Gené	1–6
(Spain) SEAT Sport	SEAT León	9	(Spain) Jordi Gené	7–10
(Spain) SEAT Sport	SEAT Toledo Cupra	10	(Germany) Peter Terting	1–8
(Spain) SEAT Sport	SEAT León	10	(Germany) Peter Terting	9–10
(Spain) SEAT Sport	SEAT Toledo Cupra	11	(United Kingdom) Jason Plato	3–6
(Spain) SEAT Sport	SEAT Toledo Cupra	12	(Spain) Marc Carol	9
(Germany) Ford Hotfiel Sport	Ford Focus	14	(Germany) Thomas Klenke	1–4, 6–9
(Germany) Ford Hotfiel Sport	Ford Focus	15	(Germany) Thomas Jäger	1–4
(Germany) Ford Hotfiel Sport	Ford Focus	16	(Germany) Michael Funke	6–10
(Germany) Ford Hotfiel Sport	Ford Focus	17	(Germany) Patrick Bernhardt	10
(United Kingdom) Chevrolet RML	Chevrolet Lacetti	21	(United Kingdom) Robert Huff	All
(United Kingdom) Chevrolet RML	Chevrolet Lacetti	22	(Italy) Nicola Larini	All
(United Kingdom) Chevrolet RML	Chevrolet Lacetti	23	(Switzerland) Alain Menu	All
Peugeot Sport Denmark	Peugeot 407	24	(France) Soheil Ayari	6
Peugeot Sport Denmark	Peugeot 407	25	(France) Éric Hélary	7
(Italy) JAS Motorsport	Honda Accord Euro R	26	(Italy) Roberto Colciago	1–6
(France) Team Oreca PlayStation	SEAT Toledo Cupra	29	(Monaco) Stéphane Ortelli	7–9
Michelin Independents Trophy
(Hong Kong) GR Asia	SEAT Toledo Cupra	18	(Mexico) Carlos Mastretta Aguilera	4–5
(Hong Kong) GR Asia	SEAT Toledo Cupra	19	(Finland) Valle Mäkelä	1–3, 6–7
(Hong Kong) GR Asia	SEAT Toledo Cupra	20	(Netherlands) Tom Coronel	All
(Hong Kong) GR Asia	SEAT Toledo Cupra	38	(Turkey) Erkut Kizilirmak	8
(Hong Kong) GR Asia	SEAT Toledo Cupra	40	(Spain) Polo Villaamil	9
(Hong Kong) GR Asia	SEAT Toledo Cupra	99	(Hong Kong) Lo Ka Fai	10
(Italy) JAS Motorsport	Honda Accord Euro R	27	(Italy) Adriano De Micheli	1–5, 7–10
(Italy) JAS Motorsport	Honda Accord Euro R	39	(United Kingdom) Simon Harrison	10
(Italy) JAS Motorsport	Honda Accord Euro R	34	(Sweden) Tomas Engström	9
Honda Dealer Team Sweden	Honda Accord Euro R	34	(Sweden) Tomas Engström	1
Honda Dealer Team Sweden	Honda Civic Type-R	35	(Sweden) Jens Hellström	1
(Sweden) Crawford Racing	BMW 320i	28	(Sweden) Carl Rosenblad	All
(Italy) Proteam Motorsport	BMW 320i	30	(Italy) Stefano D'Aste	All
(Italy) Proteam Motorsport	BMW 320i	31	(Italy) Giuseppe Cirò	All
(Germany) Wiechers-Sport	BMW 320i	32	(Germany) Marc Hennerici	All
(Czech Republic) IEP Team	Alfa Romeo 156 Gta	33	(Czech Republic) Adam Lacko	1
(Czech Republic) IEP Team	BMW 320i	33	(Czech Republic) Adam Lacko	2, 6
(Austria) RS-Line IPZ Racing	Ford Focus ST170	36	(Austria) Sascha Plöderl	2, 4, 7
(Austria) RS-Line IPZ Racing	Ford Focus ST170	37	(Germany) Frank Diefenbacher	2
(Italy) DB Motorsport	Alfa Romeo 156	51	(Italy) Salvatore Tavano	1–2, 4
(Italy) DB Motorsport	Alfa Romeo 156	52	(Italy) Andrea Larini	1–2, 4
(Italy) GDL Racing	BMW 320i	53	(Italy) Gianluca De Lorenzi	1–2, 4
(San Marino) Zerocinque Motorsport	BMW 320i	54	(San Marino) Stefano Valli	1–2, 4
(Italy) Scuderia del Girasole	SEAT Toledo Cupra	55	(Italy) Alessandro Balzan	1–2, 4
(Macau) Ao's Racing Team	BMW 320i	62	(Macau) Ao Chi Hong	10
(Macau) Ao's Racing Team	Toyota Altezza	65	(Japan) Hironori Takeuchi	10
(Germany) Engstler Motorsport	BMW 320i	63	(Hong Kong) Paul Poon	10
(Germany) Engstler Motorsport	BMW 320i	64	(New Zealand) Peter Scharmach	10

== Calendar ==
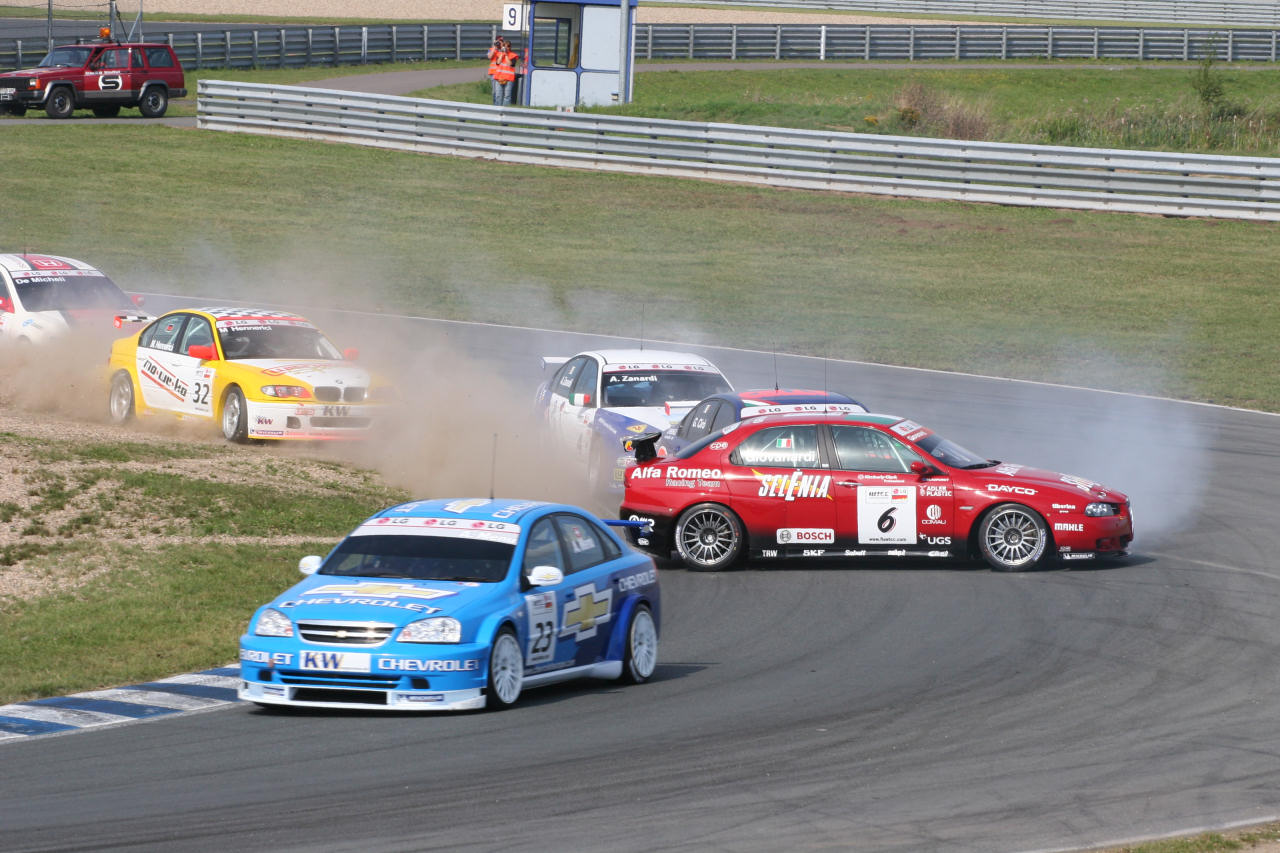
Alain Menu (Chevrolet Lacetti) leads a spinning Fabrizio Giovanardi (Alfa Romeo 156) at Oschersleben on 28.08.2005

The championship was contested over ten events, of which seven were held together with the 2005 FIA GT Championship. Each event featured two races with a distance of 50 kilometres. The starting grid order for the first race at each event was determined by the results of qualifying, and that of the second race by the results of the first race, but with the top eight cars in reverse order.

Event		Race Name	Track	Date
1	R1	Race of Italy	(Italy) Autodromo Nazionale di Monza	10 April
1	R2	Race of Italy	(Italy) Autodromo Nazionale di Monza	10 April
2	R3	Race of France	(France) Circuit de Nevers Magny-Cours	1 May
2	R4	Race of France	(France) Circuit de Nevers Magny-Cours	1 May
3	R5	Race of UK	(United Kingdom) Silverstone Circuit	15 May
3	R6	Race of UK	(United Kingdom) Silverstone Circuit	15 May
4	R7	Race of San Marino	(Italy) Autodromo Enzo e Dino Ferrari	29 May
4	R8	Race of San Marino	(Italy) Autodromo Enzo e Dino Ferrari	29 May
5	R9	Race of Mexico	(Mexico) Autódromo Miguel E. Abed	26 June
5	R10	Race of Mexico	(Mexico) Autódromo Miguel E. Abed	26 June
6	R11	Race of Belgium	(Belgium) Circuit de Spa-Francorchamps	30 July
6	R12	Race of Belgium	(Belgium) Circuit de Spa-Francorchamps	30 July
7	R13	Race of Germany	(Germany) Motorsport Arena Oschersleben	28 August
7	R14	Race of Germany	(Germany) Motorsport Arena Oschersleben	28 August
8	R15	Race of Turkey	(Turkey) Istanbul Park	18 September
8	R16	Race of Turkey	(Turkey) Istanbul Park	18 September
9	R17	Race of Spain	(Spain) Circuit Ricardo Tormo	2 October
9	R18	Race of Spain	(Spain) Circuit Ricardo Tormo	2 October
10	R19	Guia Race of Macau	(Macau) Guia Circuit	20 November
10	R20	Guia Race of Macau	(Macau) Guia Circuit	20 November

== Results and standings ==
=== Races ===
Race	Race Name	Pole Position	Fastest lap	Winning driver	Winning team	Winning independent	Report
1	Race of Italy	(Germany) Dirk Müller	(Germany) Dirk Müller	(Germany) Dirk Müller	(Germany) BMW Team Deutschland	(Germany) Marc Hennerici	Report
2	Race of Italy		(Germany) Jörg Müller	(United Kingdom) James Thompson	(Italy) Alfa Romeo Racing Team	(Germany) Marc Hennerici	Report
3	Race of France	(Germany) Jörg Müller	(Germany) Jörg Müller	(Germany) Jörg Müller	(Germany) BMW Team Deutschland	(Germany) Marc Hennerici	Report
4	Race of France		(Germany) Jörg Müller	(Germany) Jörg Müller	(Germany) BMW Team Deutschland	(Sweden) Carl Rosenblad	Report
5	(United Kingdom) Race of UK	(Italy) Gabriele Tarquini	(Italy) Fabrizio Giovanardi	(Italy) Gabriele Tarquini	(Italy) Alfa Romeo Racing Team	(Netherlands) Tom Coronel	Report
6	(United Kingdom) Race of UK		(United Kingdom) Andy Priaulx	(Sweden) Rickard Rydell	(Spain) SEAT Sport	(Germany) Marc Hennerici	Report
7	(Italy) Race of San Marino	(Italy) Fabrizio Giovanardi	(Italy) Fabrizio Giovanardi	(Italy) Fabrizio Giovanardi	(Italy) Alfa Romeo Racing Team	(Italy) Alessandro Balzan	Report
8	(Italy) Race of San Marino		(Italy) Fabrizio Giovanardi	(Germany) Dirk Müller	(Germany) BMW Team Deutschland	(Italy) Stefano D'Aste	Report
9	Race of Mexico	(Italy) Fabrizio Giovanardi	(Italy) Gabriele Tarquini	(Italy) Fabrizio Giovanardi	(Italy) Alfa Romeo Racing Team	(Netherlands) Tom Coronel	Report
10	Race of Mexico		(Italy) Fabrizio Giovanardi	(Germany) Peter Terting	(Spain) SEAT Sport	(Netherlands) Tom Coronel	Report
11	Race of Belgium	(Brazil) Augusto Farfus	(Germany) Dirk Müller	(Germany) Dirk Müller	(Germany) BMW Team Deutschland	(Netherlands) Tom Coronel	Report
12	Race of Belgium		(Brazil) Augusto Farfus	(Italy) Fabrizio Giovanardi	(Italy) Alfa Romeo Racing Team	(Italy) Stefano D'Aste	Report
13	Race of Germany	(United Kingdom) James Thompson	(Germany) Jörg Müller	(United Kingdom) Andy Priaulx	(United Kingdom) BMW Team UK	(Italy) Adriano de Micheli	Report
14	Race of Germany		(Italy) Gabriele Tarquini	(Italy) Alessandro Zanardi	BMW Team Italy-Spain	(Netherlands) Tom Coronel	Report
15	Race of Turkey	(Italy) Gabriele Tarquini	(United Kingdom) James Thompson	(Italy) Fabrizio Giovanardi	(Italy) Alfa Romeo Racing Team	(Sweden) Carl Rosenblad	Report
16	Race of Turkey		(Italy) Gabriele Tarquini	(Italy) Gabriele Tarquini	(Italy) Alfa Romeo Racing Team	(Germany) Marc Hennerici	Report
17	Race of Spain	(Spain) Jordi Gené	(Germany) Dirk Müller	(Spain) Jordi Gené	(Spain) SEAT Sport	(Italy) Adriano de Micheli	Report
18	Race of Spain		(Germany) Jörg Müller	(Germany) Jörg Müller	(Germany) BMW Team Deutschland	(Sweden) Tomas Engström	Report
19	Guia Race of Macau	(United Kingdom) Andy Priaulx	(United Kingdom) Andy Priaulx	(Brazil) Augusto Farfus	(Italy) Alfa Romeo Racing Team	(Italy) Stefano D'Aste	Report
20	Guia Race of Macau		(United Kingdom) Andy Priaulx	(Netherlands) Duncan Huisman	(Netherlands) BMW Team Holland	(Italy) Giuseppe Cirò	Report

== Championship standings ==
Points system
**1st**	**2nd**	**3rd**	**4th**	**5th**	**6th**	**7th**	**8th**
10	8	6	5	4	3	2	1

=== Drivers' Championship ===
Pos	Driver	ITA (Italy)		FRA (France)		UK (United Kingdom)		SMR (Italy)		MEX (Mexico)		BEL (Belgium)		GER (Germany)		TUR (Turkey)		ESP (Spain)		MAC (Macau)		Pts
1	(United Kingdom) Andy Priaulx	4	5	2	3	5	20†	3	2	NC	8	2	Ret	1	2	3	9	4	3	**2**	2	**101**
2	(Germany) Dirk Müller	**1**	2	6	2	10	6	4	1	18†	16	1	5	4	6	9	5	2	4	10	Ret	**86**
3	(Italy) Fabrizio Giovanardi	6	8	10	7	3	8	**1**	3	**1**	3	7	**1**	26†	Ret	1	6	6	2	19†	DNS	**81**
4	(Brazil) Augusto Farfus	3	9	8	**5**	4	4	5	5	9	10	**DSQ**	4	9	5	8	**2**	NC	7	1	3	**65**
5	(Germany) Jörg Müller	29	4	**1**	1	9	7	27	12	DNS	DNS	3	16	3	3	Ret	12	5	1	Ret	DNS	**59**
6	(Sweden) Rickard Rydell	8	**Ret**	3	11	7	1	9	4	3	6	11	Ret	2	7	5	7	Ret	11	3	7	**57**
7	(Italy) Gabriele Tarquini	2	Ret	4	8	**1**	3	15	10	2	Ret	4	17†	13	14	**7**	1	16	23†	DNS	DNS	**55**
8	(United Kingdom) James Thompson	7	1	11	9	2	Ret	7	21†	4	4	5	7	**19**	Ret	2	4	Ret	15	7	Ret	**53**
9	(Spain) Antonio García	5	3	5	4	15	Ret	2	9	5	2	6	8	14	9	4	Ret	14	6	9	DNS	**51**
10	(Italy) Alessandro Zanardi	10	7	15	24	23†	DNS	8	**6**	13	Ret	WD	WD	8	**1**	6	3	8	**5**	13	4	**36**
11	(Spain) Jordi Gené	9	6	7	6	11	5	Ret	13	Ret	19†	12	Ret	7	4	17	Ret	**1**	14	18	5	**33**
12	(Germany) Peter Terting	11	17	9	10	6	16	10	7	7	1	10	10	5	Ret	NC	10	3	12	8	**6**	**31**
13	(Netherlands) Duncan Huisman																			6	1	**13**
14	(Netherlands) Tom Coronel	15	Ret	23	DSQ	14	14	18	Ret	8	**5**	13	3	21	13	Ret	DNS	NC	13	Ret	DNS	**11**
15	(United Kingdom) Jason Plato					8	**2**	11	8	11	12	9	14									**10**
16	(Italy) Nicola Larini	24	15	17	13	Ret	DNS	13	11	10	7	17	18†	17	11	NC	Ret	7	Ret	4	10†	**9**
17	(Switzerland) Alain Menu	22	24†	Ret	DNS	Ret	13	14	14	NC	13	14	6	11	8	10	8	Ret	DNS	5	DSQ	**9**
18	(Italy) Stefano D'Aste	16	22†	Ret	DNS	Ret	Ret	22	15	12	11	16	2	20	19	14	15	17	17	11	Ret	**8**
19	(Italy) Roberto Colciago	12	Ret	12	12	12	19	6	Ret	Ret	18	8	Ret									**4**
20	(Monaco) Stéphane Ortelli													6	15	Ret	Ret	9	22†			**3**
=	(United Kingdom) Robert Huff	20	Ret	19	15	13	Ret	20	Ret	6	Ret	NC	11	23	12	16	13	Ret	DNS	Ret	Ret	**3**
22	(Italy) Giuseppe Cirò	Ret	18	21	17	22	11	Ret	DNS	14	9	15	15	24	16	12	14	12	10	Ret	8	**1**
=	(Spain) Marc Carol																	10	8			**1**
–	(Germany) Marc Hennerici	13	10	13	16	17	9	Ret	Ret	17	14	18	9	16	21	13	11	Ret	20	14	Ret	**0**
–	(Sweden) Tomas Engström	14	23															13	9			**0**
–	(Germany) Patrick Bernhardt																			21	9	**0**
–	(Germany) Michael Funke											Ret	DNS	12	10	Ret	DNS	Ret	18	17†	DNS	**0**
–	(Finland) Valle Mäkelä	Ret	13	16	Ret	16	10					19	Ret	18	Ret							**0**
–	(Germany) Thomas Klenke	Ret	DNS	Ret	22	19	18	17	16			21	Ret	10	20	Ret	17	Ret	DNS			**0**
–	(Sweden) Carl Rosenblad	DNS	DNS	14	14	21	12	16	Ret	16	15	22	12	22	17	11	18	Ret	16	12	Ret	**0**
–	(Italy) Alessandro Balzan	18	11	Ret	DNS			12	DSQ													**0**
–	(Italy) Adriano de Micheli	21	14	22	20	20	15	Ret	DNS	DNS	DNS			15	18	15	16	11	19	15	Ret	**0**
–	(Czech Republic) Adam Lacko	25	12	Ret	DNS							20	13									**0**
–	(Mexico) Carlos Mastretta Aguilera							25	18	15	17											**0**
–	(Spain) Polo Villaamil																	15	21			**0**
–	(Italy) Salvatore Tavano	17	16	18	18			19	20													**0**
–	(New Zealand) Peter Scharmach																			16	Ret	**0**
–	(Germany) Thomas Jäger	28	Ret	24	21	18	17	26	19													**0**
–	(Italy) Gianluca de Lorenzi	23	Ret	20	19			21	17													**0**
–	(Italy) Andrea Larini	19	20	Ret	DNS			23	22†													**0**
–	(San Marino) Stefano Valli	27	19	25	23			24	Ret													**0**
–	(United Kingdom) Simon Harrison																			20†	DNS	**0**
–	(Sweden) Jens Hellström	26	21																			**0**
–	(Austria) Sascha Plöderl			NC	25†			Ret	DNS					25	22†							**0**
–	(France) Soheil Ayari											23	Ret									**0**
–	(France) Éric Hélary													Ret	DNS							**0**
–	(Turkey) Erkut Kizilirmak															Ret	DNS					**0**
–	(Macau) André Couto																			Ret	DNS	**0**
–	(Germany) Frank Diefenbacher			DNS	DNS																	–
–	(Macau) Ao Chi Hong																			DNS	DNS	–
–	(Hong Kong) Lo Ka Fai																			DNQ	DNQ	–
–	(Hong Kong) Paul Poon																			DNQ	DNQ	–
–	(Japan) Hironori Takeuchi																			DNQ	DNQ	–
Pos	Driver	ITA (Italy)		FRA (France)		UK (United Kingdom)		SMR (Italy)		MEX (Mexico)		BEL (Belgium)		GER (Germany)		TUR (Turkey)		ESP (Spain)		MAC (Macau)		Pts

Colour	Result
Gold	Winner
Silver	Second place
Bronze	Third place
Green	Points classification
Blue	Non-points classification
Blue	Non-classified finish (NC)
Purple	Retired, not classified (Ret)
Red	Did not qualify (DNQ)
Red	Did not pre-qualify (DNPQ)
Black	Disqualified (DSQ)
White	Did not start (DNS)
White	Withdrew (WD)
White	Race cancelled (C)
Blank	Did not practice (DNP)
Blank	Did not arrive (DNA)
Blank	Excluded (EX)

**Bold** – Pole
Italics – Fastest Lap

† — Drivers did not finish the race, but were classified as they completed over 90% of the race distance.

Drivers' Championship points were awarded on a 10–8–6–5–4–3–2–1 basis to first eight finishers at each race.

Note: Drivers who did not score points during the season were not classified into Drivers' Championship positions.

=== Manufacturers' Championship ===
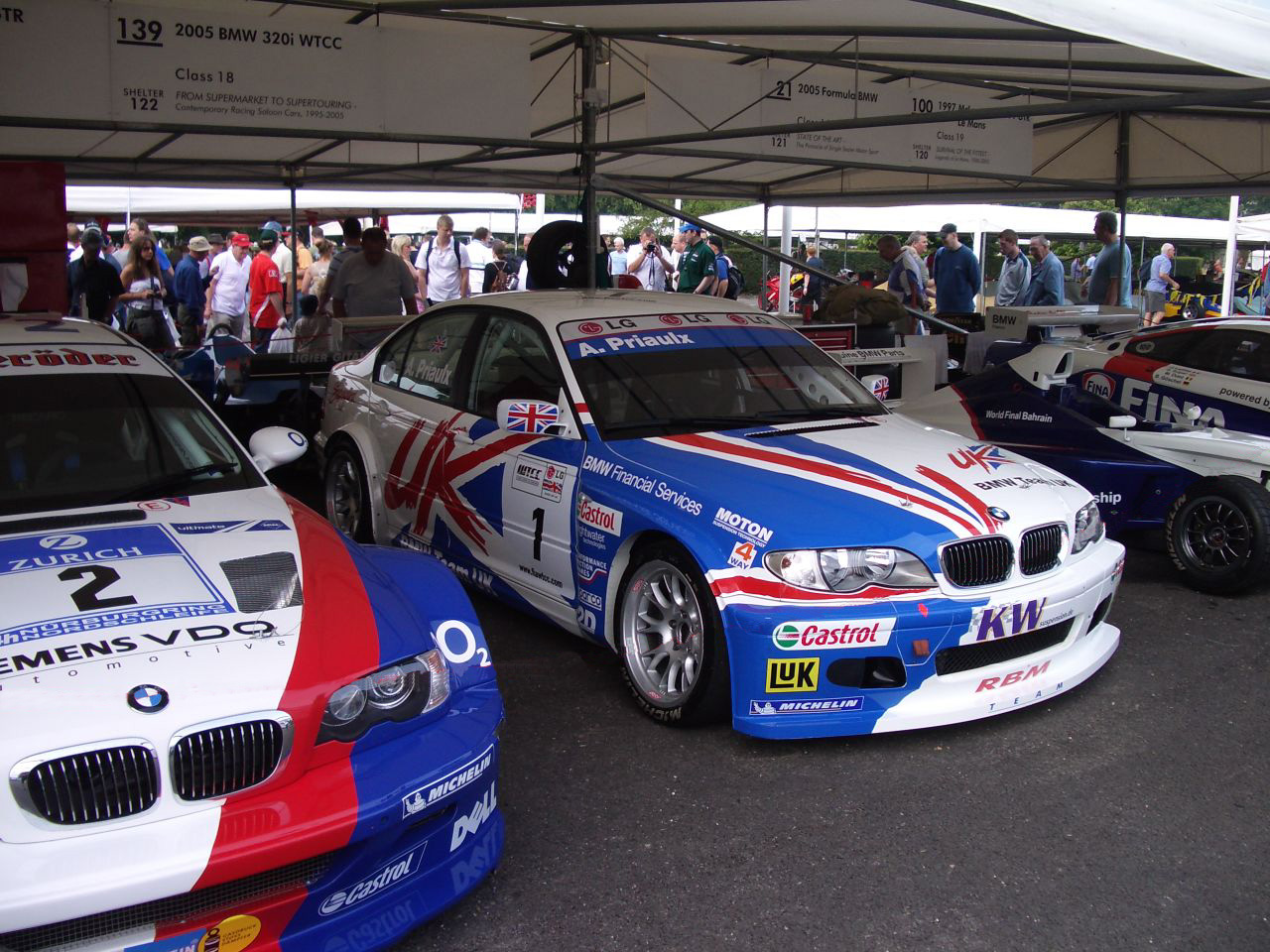
BMW won the Manufacturers' Championship with the 320i

Pos	Manufacturer	ITA (Italy)		FRA (France)		UK (United Kingdom)		SMR (Italy)		MEX (Mexico)		BEL (Belgium)		GER (Germany)		TUR (Turkey)		ESP (Spain)		MAC (Macau)		Pts
1	(Germany) BMW	1	2	1	1	5	6	2	1	5	2	1	2	1	1	3	3	2	1	2	1	273
1	(Germany) BMW	4	3	2	2	9	7	3	2	12	8	2	5	3	2	4	5	4	3	6	2	273
2	(Italy) Alfa Romeo	2	1	4	5	1	3	1	3	1	3	4	1	9	5	1	1	6	2	1	3	237
2	(Italy) Alfa Romeo	3	8	8	7	2	4	5	5	2	4	5	4	13	14	2	2	16	7	7	Ret	237
3	(Spain) SEAT	8	6	3	6	6	1	9	4	3	1	9	3	2	4	5	7	1	8	3	5	186
3	(Spain) SEAT	9	17	7	10	7	2	10	7	7	5	10	10	5	7	17	10	3	11	8	6	186
4	(United States) Chevrolet	20	15	17	13	13	13	13	11	6	7	14	6	11	8	10	8	7	Ret	4	10†	68
4	(United States) Chevrolet	22	24†	19	16	Ret	Ret	14	14	10	13	17	11	17	11	16	13	Ret	DNS	5	Ret	68
5	(United States) Ford	28	Ret	24	22	18	17	17	16			21	Ret	10	10	Ret	17	Ret	18	17†	9	13
5	(United States) Ford	Ret	DNS	Ret	23	19	18	26	19			Ret	DNS	12	20	Ret	DNS	Ret	DNS	21	DNS	13
Pos	Manufacturer	ITA (Italy)		FRA (France)		UK (United Kingdom)		SMR (Italy)		MEX (Mexico)		BEL (Belgium)		GER (Germany)		TUR (Turkey)		ESP (Spain)		MAC (Macau)		Pts

The Manufacturers' title was awarded to the manufacturer which had scored the highest number of points, taking into account all the results obtained by the best two cars classified per manufacturer in each race. All the other cars of that same manufacturer were considered invisible as far as scoring points was concerned. Points were awarded on a 10–8–6–5–4–3–2–1 basis for each race.

=== Michelin Independents' Trophy ===
Pos	Driver	ITA (Italy)		FRA (France)		UK (United Kingdom)		SMR (Italy)		MEX (Mexico)		BEL (Belgium)		GER (Germany)		TUR (Turkey)		ESP (Spain)		MAC (Macau)		Pts
1	(Germany) Marc Hennerici	**13**	**10**	13	**16**	17	9	Ret	Ret	17	14	18	9	16	21	13	11	Ret	20	14	Ret	**114**
2	(Italy) Giuseppe Cirò	Ret	18	21	17	22	11	Ret	DNS	14	9	15	15	**24**	16	12	14	12	10	Ret	8	**107**
3	(Italy) Stefano D'Aste	16	22†	Ret	DNS	Ret	Ret	22	15	12	11	16	2	20	19	14	15	17	17	11	**Ret**	**96**
4	(Sweden) Carl Rosenblad	DNS	DNS	14	14	21	12	16	Ret	16	15	22	12	22	17	11	**18**	Ret	16	12	Ret	**94**
5	(Netherlands) Tom Coronel	15	Ret	23	DSQ	**14**	**14**	18	Ret	**8**	**5**	**13**	**3**	21	13	Ret	DNS	NC	13	**Ret**	DNS	**85**
6	(Italy) Adriano de Micheli	21	14	22	20	20	15	**Ret**	DNS	DNS	DNS			15	**18**	**15**	16	**11**	**19**	15	Ret	**65**
7	(Finland) Valle Mäkelä	Ret	13	**16**	Ret	16	10					19	Ret	18	Ret							**37**
8	(Italy) Salvatore Tavano	17	16	18	18			19	20													**27**
9	(Sweden) Tomas Engström	14	23															13	9			**24**
10	(Italy) Alessandro Balzan	18	11	Ret	DNS			12	**DSQ**													**21**
11	(Italy) Gianluca de Lorenzi	23	Ret	20	19			21	17													**20**
12	(Mexico) Carlos Mastretta Aguilera							25	18	15	17											**14**
13	(Czech Republic) Adam Lacko	25	12	Ret	DNS							20	13									**13**
14	(United Kingdom) Simon Harrison																			20†	DNS	**8**
15	(Italy) Andrea Larini	19	20	Ret	DNS			23	22†													**8**
16	(Spain) Polo Villaamil																	15	21			**6**
17	(San Marino) Stefano Valli	27	19	25	23			24	Ret													**4**
18	(Austria) Sascha Plöderl			NC	25†			Ret	DNS					25	22†							**4**
-	(Sweden) Jens Hellström	26	21																			**0**
–	(Turkey) Erkut Kizilirmak															Ret	DNS					**0**
–	(Germany) Frank Diefenbacher			DNS	DNS																	–
–	(Hong Kong) Lo Ka Fai																			DNQ	DNQ	–
Pos	Driver	ITA (Italy)		FRA (France)		UK (United Kingdom)		SMR (Italy)		MEX (Mexico)		BEL (Belgium)		GER (Germany)		TUR (Turkey)		ESP (Spain)		MAC (Macau)		Pts

Championship promoter KSO organised the Michelin Independent Drivers' Trophy within the 2005 FIA World Touring Car Championship. A driver's eligibility to compete for the Trophy was determined exclusively by KSO, taking into consideration various criteria relating to the team, driver and car. Points were awarded to eligible drivers on a 10–8–6–5–4–3–2–1 basis for races 1 to 18 and on a 20–16–12–10–8–6–4–2 basis for races 19 & 20.

=== Michelin Teams' Trophy ===
Pos	Team	ITA (Italy)		FRA (France)		UK (United Kingdom)		SMR (Italy)		MEX (Mexico)		BEL (Belgium)		GER (Germany)		TUR (Turkey)		ESP (Spain)		MAC (Macau)		Pts
1	(Italy) Proteam Motorsport	16	18	21	18	22	11	22	15	12	9	15	2	20	16	12	14	12	10	11	8	183
1	(Italy) Proteam Motorsport	Ret	22†	Ret	DNS	Ret	Ret	Ret	DNS	14	11	16	15	24	19	14	15	17	17	Ret	Ret	183
2	(Hong Kong) GR Asia	15	13	16	Ret	14	10	18	18	8	5	13	3	18	13	Ret	DNS	15	13	Ret	DNS	142
2	(Hong Kong) GR Asia	Ret	Ret	23	DSQ	16	14	25	Ret	15	17	19	Ret	21	Ret	Ret	DNS	NC	21	DNQ	DNQ	142
3	(Germany) Wiechers-Sport	13	10	13	16	17	9	Ret	Ret	17	14	18	9	16	21	13	11	Ret	20	14	Ret	108
4	(Sweden) Crawford Racing	DNS	DNS	14	14	21	12	16	Ret	16	15	22	12	22	17	11	18	Ret	16	12	Ret	86
5	(Italy) JAS Motorsport	21	14	22	20	20	15	Ret	DNS	DNS	DNS			15	18	15	16	11	9	15	Ret	80
5	(Italy) JAS Motorsport																	13	19	20†	DNS	80
6	(Italy) DB Motorsport	17	16	18	18			19	20													35
6	(Italy) DB Motorsport	19	20	Ret	DNS			23	22†													35
7	(Italy) Scuderia del Girasole	18	11	Ret	DNS			12	DSQ													21
8	(Italy) GDL Racing	23	Ret	20	19			21	17													20
9	(Czech Republic) IEP Team	25	12	Ret	DNS							20	13									13
10	Honda Dealer Team Sweden	14	21																			8
10	Honda Dealer Team Sweden	26	23																			8
11	(San Marino) Zerocinque Motorsport	27	19	25	23			24	Ret													4
12	(Austria) RS-Line IPZ Racing			NC	25†			Ret	DNS					25	22†							4
12	(Austria) RS-Line IPZ Racing			DNS	DNS																	4
Pos	Team	ITA (Italy)		FRA (France)		UK (United Kingdom)		SMR (Italy)		MEX (Mexico)		BEL (Belgium)		GER (Germany)		TUR (Turkey)		ESP (Spain)		MAC (Macau)		Pts

Championship promoter KSO organised the Michelin Teams' Trophy within the 2005 FIA World Touring Car Championship. All teams participating in the Championship were eligible to score points towards the Trophy, however points were only awarded for the two best classified cars of each team, providing they are driven by drivers classified by KSO as Independent Drivers. Any other cars of that same team were invisible as far as point scoring was concerned. Points towards the Michelin Teams' Trophy were awarded on a 10–8–6–5–4–3–2–1 basis at all races.
