= 2005 FIA WTCC Race of San Marino =

(Italy) 2005 Race of San Marino
Race details
- Round 4 of 10 in the 2005 World Touring Car Championship at Autodromo Enzo e Dino Ferrari in Imola, Italy.
- Date: May 29, 2005
- Location: Imola, Italy
- Course: Autodromo Enzo e Dino Ferrari; 4.933 kilometres (3.065 mi)

Race One
- Laps: 11
Pole position
Driver		(Italy) Fabrizio Giovanardi	Alfa Romeo Racing Team
Time		1:58.573	
Podium
First		(Italy) Fabrizio Giovanardi	Alfa Romeo Racing Team
Second		(Spain) Antonio García	BMW Team Italy-Spain
Third		(United Kingdom) Andy Priaulx	BMW Team UK
Fastest Lap
Driver		(Italy) Fabrizio Giovanardi	Alfa Romeo Racing Team
Time		2:00.208	

Race Two
- Laps: 11
Podium
First		(Germany) Dirk Müller	BMW Team Deutschland
Second		(United Kingdom) Andy Priaulx	BMW Team UK
Third		(Italy) Fabrizio Giovanardi	Alfa Romeo Racing Team
Fastest Lap
Driver		(Italy) Fabrizio Giovanardi	Alfa Romeo Racing Team
Time		2:00.625	

The 2005 FIA WTCC Race Of San Marino was the fourth round of the 2005 World Touring Car Championship season. It was held at the Autodromo Enzo e Dino Ferrari. The two races were won by Fabrizio Giovanardi and Dirk Müller.

== Report ==
=== Qualifying ===
After a disappointing start to the season with only 13 points from the first three weekends, Fabrizio Giovanardi bounced back in Imola with a dominant pole position for Alfa Romeo after dominating qualifying with a time of 1:58.573. Antonio García was second for BMW nearly six-tenths of a second behind, and SEAT also did a good job with Jordi Gené qualifying third. Two more Alfas driven by Augusto Farfus and Gabriele Tarquini followed ahead of Roberto Colciago who was driving for Honda.

=== Race 1 ===
Gabriele Tarquini and Peter Terting, who qualified fifth and seventh were both given ten-lace grid penalties for an incident in the previous race and an engine change respectively. García started well and overtook polesitter Fabrizio Giovanardi at the line, with reigning champion Andy Priaulx jumping up to second in his BMW. Championship leader Dirk Müller got the better of second row starters Jordi Gené and Augusto Farfus, with Roberto Colciago and James Thompson, in another Alfa following. Tarquini and Jörg Müller, second and third in the championship, collided which sent the former to the back of the field, and the BMW man had to pit for repairs. At the front, Giovanardi dealt with Priaulx on the first lap, and García on the second, and was never caught again. Colciago overtook Farfus on the same lap, and then tried to do the same on Gené, however there was contact and the Spaniard crashed. Colciago continued, but was passed by Farfus on the next lap. The rest of the race was quiet, with Giovanardi easily winning from García in a lonely second. Priaulx was third ahead of Dirk Müller, Farfus, Colciago, Thompson and Alex Zanardi's BMW. A 12th-place finish was enough for Alessandro Balzan to win the Independent's Trophy.

=== Race 2 ===
Alex Zanardi started on pole on the reversed grid, and he had no problem converting it into a lead early on. The other BMWs were all very strong off the line, with Dirk Müller, Priaulx and García jumping into 2nd, 3rd and 5th from 5th, 6th and 7th respectively. James Thompson's Alfa, who started 2nd was 4th splitting the BMWs, and his teammates Farfus and Giovanardi were 6th and 8th, with Rickard Rydell's SEAT splitting them. Giovanardi started to move up the order, passing both Rydell and Farfus on the second lap. Zanardi was unable to hold his lead for long, with his teammates Dirk Müller and Priaulx passing him and then pulling away. Behind, there was contact between García and Giovanardi while fighting for fifth, which pushed the Spaniard down the order, whereas Farfus took advantage and passed a rattled Giovanardi two laps later. Dirk Müller and Priaulx ran comfortably at the front, with the Englishman despite staying with a second, not able to make an impression on his teammate. Thompson in fourth had just started to put pressure on Zanardi when he made a mistake and was passed by his two teammates, Rydell and Jason Plato in another SEAT. There was contact with the latter, which sent Thompson packing down the order. Dirk Müller took his second win of the season, with Priaulx in second. The battle for third between Zanardi and Farfus reached a head on the final lap, when an overtaking attempt from Farfus resulted in a collision, sending both off the track. Giovanardi thus took third, with Rydell fourth, whereas Farfus rejoined fifth and Zanardi had to settle for sixth, with the SEATS of Peter Terting and Plato completing the points. Neither Gabriele Tarquini nor Jörg Müller was able to get into the points, despite fighting drives. Balzan won the Independent's Trophy after finishing 13th, however he was disqualified for an underweight car, handing it to countryman Stefano D'Aste.

== Classification ==
=== Race 1 ===
Pos	No		Driver	Team	Car	Laps	Time/Retired	Grid	Points
1	6		(Italy) Fabrizio Giovanardi	Alfa Romeo Racing Team	Alfa Romeo 156	11	22:12.202	1	10
2	5		(Spain) Antonio García	BMW Team Italy-Spain	BMW 320i	11	+3.146	2	8
3	1		(United Kingdom) Andy Priaulx	BMW Team UK	BMW 320i	11	+8.131	5	6
4	43		(Germany) Dirk Müller	BMW Team Deutschland	BMW 320i	11	+9.126	7	5
5	7		(Brazil) Augusto Farfus	Alfa Romeo Racing Team	Alfa Romeo 156	11	+12.299	4	4
6	26		(Italy) Roberto Colciago	JAS Motorsport	Honda Accord Euro R	11	+15.175	6	3
7	3		(United Kingdom) James Thompson	Alfa Romeo Racing Team	Alfa Romeo 156	11	+16.995	8	2
8	4		(Italy) Alex Zanardi	BMW Team Italy-Spain	BMW 320i	11	+17.476	13	1
9	8		(Sweden) Rickard Rydell	SEAT Sport	SEAT Toledo Cupra	11	+17.974	9	
10	10		(Germany) Peter Terting	SEAT Sport	SEAT Toledo Cupra	11	+18.341	17	
11	11		(United Kingdom) Jason Plato	SEAT Sport	SEAT Toledo Cupra	11	+23.788	11	
12	55	IT	(Italy) Alessandro Balzan	Scuderia del Girasole	SEAT Toledo Cupra	11	+25.680	15	
13	22		(Italy) Nicola Larini	Chevrolet	Chevrolet Lacetti	11	+34.619	20	
14	23		(Switzerland) Alain Menu	Chevrolet	Chevrolet Lacetti	11	+35.495	18	
15	2		(Italy) Gabriele Tarquini	Alfa Romeo Racing Team	Alfa Romeo 156	11	+41.034	14	
16	28	IT	(Sweden) Carl Rosenblad	Crawford Racing	BMW 320i	11	+41.816	16	
17	14		(Germany) Thomas Klenke	Ford Hotfiel Sport	Ford Focus	11	+43.746	25	
18	20	IT	(Netherlands) Tom Coronel	GR Asia	SEAT Toledo Cupra	11	+47.156	21	
19	51	IT	(Italy) Salvatore Tavano	DB Motorsport	Alfa Romeo 156	11	+51.960	24	
20	21		(United Kingdom) Robert Huff	Chevrolet	Chevrolet Lacetti	11	+52.569	22	
21	53	IT	(Italy) Gianluca de Lorenzi	GDL Racing	BMW 320i	11	+55.599	28	
22	30	IT	(Italy) Stefano D'Aste	Proteam Motorsport	BMW 320i	11	+57.302	19	
23	52	IT	(Italy) Andrea Larini	DB Motorsport	Alfa Romeo 156	11	+1:07.319	27	
24	54	IT	(San Marino) Stefano Valli	Zerocinque Motorsport	BMW 320i	11	+1:07.922	29	
25	18	IT	(Mexico) Carlos Mastretta	GR Asia	SEAT Toledo Cupra	11	+1:08.253	30	
26	15		(Germany) Thomas Jäger	Ford Hotfiel Sport	Ford Focus	11	+2:13.774	31	
27	42		(Germany) Jörg Müller	BMW Team Deutschland	BMW 320i	10	+1 Lap	12	
Ret	36	IT	(Austria) Sascha Plöderl	RS-Line IPZ Racing	Ford Focus ST170	5	Accident	32	
Ret	31	IT	(Italy) Giuseppe Cirò	Proteam Motorsport	BMW 320i	5	Retirement	23	
Ret	27	IT	(Italy) Adriano de Micheli	JAS Motorsport	Honda Accord Euro R	2	Accident	10	
Ret	32	IT	(Germany) Marc Hennerici	Wiechers-Sport	BMW 320i	2	Accident	26	
Ret	9		(Spain) Jordi Gené	SEAT Sport	SEAT Toledo Cupra	1	Collision	3	

=== Race 2 ===
Pos	No		Driver	Team	Car	Laps	Time/Retired	Grid	Points
1	43		(Germany) Dirk Müller	BMW Team Deutschland	BMW 320i	11	22:17.549	5	10
2	1		(United Kingdom) Andy Priaulx	BMW Team UK	BMW 320i	11	+2.027	6	8
3	6		(Italy) Fabrizio Giovanardi	Alfa Romeo Racing Team	Alfa Romeo 156	11	+5.822	8	6
4	8		(Sweden) Rickard Rydell	SEAT Sport	SEAT Toledo Cupra	11	+6.786	9	5
5	7		(Brazil) Augusto Farfus	Alfa Romeo Racing Team	Alfa Romeo 156	11	+8.795	4	4
6	4		(Italy) Alex Zanardi	BMW Team Italy-Spain	BMW 320i	11	+10.447	1	3
7	10		(Germany) Peter Terting	SEAT Sport	SEAT Toledo Cupra	11	+10.713	10	2
8	11		(United Kingdom) Jason Plato	SEAT Sport	SEAT Toledo Cupra	11	+11.135	11	1
9	5		(Spain) Antonio García	BMW Team Italy-Spain	BMW 320i	11	+12.115	7	
10	2		(Italy) Gabriele Tarquini	Alfa Romeo Racing Team	Alfa Romeo 156	11	+12.446	15	
11	22		(Italy) Nicola Larini	Chevrolet	Chevrolet Lacetti	11	+15.644	13	
12	42		(Germany) Jörg Müller	BMW Team Deutschland	BMW 320i	11	+15.805	27	
13	9		(Spain) Jordi Gené	SEAT Sport	SEAT Toledo Cupra	11	+20.370	32	
14	23		(Switzerland) Alain Menu	Chevrolet	Chevrolet Lacetti	11	+23.138	14	
15	30	IT	(Italy) Stefano D'Aste	Proteam Motorsport	BMW 320i	11	+34.187	22	
16	14		(Germany) Thomas Klenke	Ford Hotfiel Sport	Ford Focus	11	+35.640	17	
17	53	IT	(Italy) Gianluca de Lorenzi	GDL Racing	BMW 320i	11	+39.018	21	
18	18	IT	(Mexico) Carlos Mastretta	GR Asia	SEAT Toledo Cupra	11	+40.000	25	
19	15		(Germany) Thomas Jäger	Ford Hotfiel Sport	Ford Focus	11	+44.651	26	
20	51	IT	(Italy) Salvatore Tavano	DB Motorsport	Alfa Romeo 156	11	+2:13.246	19	
21	3		(United Kingdom) James Thompson	Alfa Romeo Racing Team	Alfa Romeo 156	10	+1 Lap	2	
22	52	IT	(Italy) Andrea Larini	DB Motorsport	Alfa Romeo 156	8	+3 Laps	23	
Ret	26		(Italy) Roberto Colciago	JAS Motorsport	Honda Accord Euro R	4	Accident	3	
Ret	28	IT	(Sweden) Carl Rosenblad	Crawford Racing	BMW 320i	4	Retirement	16	
Ret	20	IT	(Netherlands) Tom Coronel	GR Asia	SEAT Toledo Cupra	4	Accident	18	
Ret	21		(United Kingdom) Robert Huff	Chevrolet	Chevrolet Lacetti	0	Retirement	20	
DNS	54	IT	(San Marino) Stefano Valli	Zerocinque Motorsport	BMW 320i	0		24	
DNS	36	IT	(Austria) Sascha Plöderl	RS-Line IPZ Racing	Ford Focus ST170	0		28	
DNS	31	IT	(Italy) Giuseppe Cirò	Proteam Motorsport	BMW 320i	0		29	
DNS	27	IT	(Italy) Adriano de Micheli	JAS Motorsport	Honda Accord Euro R	0		30	
DNS	32	IT	(Germany) Marc Hennerici	Wiechers-Sport	BMW 320i	0		31	
DSQ	55	IT	(Italy) Alessandro Balzan	Scuderia del Girasole	SEAT Toledo Cupra	11	Disqualified	12	

== Standings after the races ==
Drivers' Championship standings

Pos	Driver	Points
1	(Germany) Dirk Müller	47
2	(United Kingdom) Andy Priaulx	41
3	(Italy) Gabriele Tarquini	30
4	(Italy) Fabrizio Giovanardi	29
5	(Brazil) Augusto Farfus	29

Manufacturers' Championship standings

Pos	Constructor	Points
1	(Germany) BMW	113
2	(Italy) Alfa Romeo	100
3	(Spain) SEAT	75
4	(United States) Chevrolet	22
5	(United States) Ford	2
