= 2005 FIA WTCC Race of Italy =

2005 Race of Italy
Race details
- Round 1 of 10 in the 2005 World Touring Car Championship at Autodromo Nazionale di Monza in Monza, Italy.
- Date: April 10, 2005
- Location: Monza, Italy
- Course: Autodromo Nazionale di Monza; 5.793 kilometres (3.600 mi)

Race One
- Laps: 9
Pole position
Driver		(Germany) Dirk Müller	BMW Team Deutschland
Time		1:59.009	
Podium
First		(Germany) Dirk Müller	BMW Team Deutschland
Second		(Italy) Gabriele Tarquini	Alfa Romeo Racing Team
Third		(Brazil) Augusto Farfus	Alfa Romeo Racing Team
Fastest Lap
Driver		(Germany) Dirk Müller	BMW Team Deutschland
Time		1:59.552	

Race Two
- Laps: 9
Podium
First		(United Kingdom) James Thompson	Alfa Romeo Racing Team
Second		(Germany) Dirk Müller	BMW Team Deutschland
Third		(Spain) Antonio García	BMW Team Italy-Spain
Fastest Lap
Driver		(Germany) Jörg Müller	BMW Team Deutschland
Time		1:59.058	

The 2005 FIA WTCC Race of Italy was the opening round of the 2005 World Touring Car Championship season, the first season of the revived World Touring Car Championship, after a previous season in 1987. It was held at the Autodromo Nazionale di Monza at Monza in Italy on April 10, 2005. BMW and Alfa Romeo took one victory each, Dirk Müller winning Race 1 for the former, and James Thompson winning Race 2.

== Report ==
=== Qualifying ===
Dirk Müller took pole position for the first World Touring Car Championship race by topping the timesheets in the qualifying session with a time of 1:59.009. Two other BMWs had finished behind him, fellow BMW Team Deutschland driver Jörg Müller, and the BMW Team Italy-Spain car of Antonio García. However, Jörg had his best time disallowed by the stewards after he failed to stop at the weighing scales, dropping him to 18th. Alfa Romeo Racing Team drivers Gabriele Tarquini and Augusto Farfus qualified in third and fourth place, with reigning European Touring Car Champion Andy Priaulx fifth for BMW Team UK. The session was brought to a premature end after Alain Menu crashed his Chevrolet Lacetti, bringing out the red flags.

=== Race 1 ===
Dirk Müller led the first race of the new FIA World Touring Car Championship from pole position to take the victory. Behind him, Gabriele Tarquini finished second, with his Alfa Romeo teammate Augusto Farfus finishing third after managing to keep Andy Priaulx at bay. Antonio García slipped back from his front row starting position to finish fifth after he had been nudged off the track by Farfus during an overtaking manoeuvre. The remaining Alfa Romeo drivers, Fabrizio Giovanardi and James Thompson, finished in sixth and seventh position, with SEAT Sport's Rickard Rydell taking the last point in eighth as well as pole position for Race 2, for which the top eight finishers from the first race are reversed on the race two grid. Marc Hennerici finished 13th overall to take the victory in the Independent's Trophy.

=== Race 2 ===
Polesitter Rydell was passed by Thompson for the lead at the start of the second race. Meanwhile, Giovanardi stalled on the second row of the grid. García and Dirk Müller were able to pass Rydell for second and third and began chasing Thompson for the lead, but García made a mistake and lost three positions to Müller, Farfus and Tarquini. On the sixth lap, Farfus ran wide at the first chicane, while Müller and Tarquini clashed, putting the Italian out of the race. This allowed García to regain third behind Dirk Müller. Thompson crossed the line to win the race ahead of Dirk Müller and García. Jörg Müller recovered from 29th on the grid to finish in fourth, with Jordi Gené, Alessandro Zanardi and Giovanardi rounding out the points. Hennerici won the Independent's Trophy after finishing tenth.

== Classification ==
=== Race 1 ===
Pos	No		Driver	Team	Car	Laps	Time/Retired	Grid	Points
1	43		(Germany) Dirk Müller	BMW Team Deutschland	BMW 320i	9	18:03.203	1	10
2	2		(Italy) Gabriele Tarquini	Alfa Romeo Racing Team	Alfa Romeo 156	9	+2.465	3	8
3	7		(Brazil) Augusto Farfus	Alfa Romeo Racing Team	Alfa Romeo 156	9	+3.854	4	6
4	1		(United Kingdom) Andy Priaulx	BMW Team UK	BMW 320i	9	+3.977	5	5
5	5		(Spain) Antonio García	BMW Team Italy-Spain	BMW 320i	9	+8.088	2	4
6	6		(Italy) Fabrizio Giovanardi	Alfa Romeo Racing Team	Alfa Romeo 156	9	+8.248	8	3
7	3		(United Kingdom) James Thompson	Alfa Romeo Racing Team	Alfa Romeo 156	9	+8.910	9	2
8	8		(Sweden) Rickard Rydell	SEAT Sport	SEAT Toledo Cupra	9	+9.192	7	1
9	9		(Spain) Jordi Gené	SEAT Sport	SEAT Toledo Cupra	9	+9.414	6	
10	4		(Italy) Alex Zanardi	BMW Team Italy-Spain	BMW 320i	9	+14.843	11	
11	10		(Germany) Peter Terting	SEAT Sport	SEAT Toledo Cupra	9	+16.042	10	
12	26		(Italy) Roberto Colciago	JAS Motorsport	Honda Accord Euro R	9	+20.441	13	
13	32	IT	(Germany) Marc Hennerici	Wiechers-Sport	BMW 320i	9	+21.819	12	
14	34	IT	(Sweden) Tomas Engström	Honda Dealer Team Sweden	Honda Accord Euro R	9	+26.396	17	
15	20	IT	(Netherlands) Tom Coronel	GR Asia	SEAT Toledo Cupra	9	+26.571	20	
16	30	IT	(Italy) Stefano D'Aste	Proteam Motorsport	BMW 320i	9	+26.837	16	
17	51	IT	(Italy) Salvatore Tavano	DB Motorsport	Alfa Romeo 156	9	+31.827	19	
18	55	IT	(Italy) Alessandro Balzan	Scuderia del Girasole	SEAT Toledo Cupra	9	+33.477	25	
19	52	IT	(Italy) Andrea Larini	DB Motorsport	Alfa Romeo 156	9	+37.711	15	
20	21		(United Kingdom) Robert Huff	Chevrolet	Chevrolet Lacetti	9	+37.720	21	
21	27	IT	(Italy) Adriano de Micheli	JAS Motorsport	Honda Accord Euro R	9	+43.914	30	
22	23		(Switzerland) Alain Menu	Chevrolet	Chevrolet Lacetti	9	+44.271	23	
23	53	IT	(Italy) Gianluca de Lorenzi	GDL Racing	BMW 320i	9	+44.827	31	
24	22		(Italy) Nicola Larini	Chevrolet	Chevrolet Lacetti	9	+45.767	24	
25	33	IT	(Czech Republic) Adam Lacko	IEP Team	Alfa Romeo 156 Gta	9	+49.641	22	
26	35	IT	(Sweden) Jens Hellström	Honda Dealer Team Sweden	Honda Civic Type-R	9	+57.996	33	
27	54	IT	(San Marino) Stefano Valli	Zerocinque Motorsport	BMW 320i	9	+58.363	32	
28	15		(Germany) Thomas Jäger	Ford Hotfiel Sport	Ford Focus	9	+1:05.240	25	
29	42		(Germany) Jörg Müller	BMW Team Deutschland	BMW 320i	8	+1 Lap	18	
Ret	14		(Germany) Thomas Klenke	Ford Hotfiel Sport	Ford Focus	4	Accident	28	
Ret	19	IT	(Finland) Valle Mäkelä	GR Asia	SEAT Toledo Cupra	4	Accident	26	
Ret	31	IT	(Italy) Giuseppe Cirò	Proteam Motorsport	BMW 320i	0	Mechanical	29	
DNS	28	IT	(Sweden) Carl Rosenblad	Crawford Racing	BMW 320i	0		14	

=== Race 2 ===
Pos	No		Driver	Team	Car	Laps	Time/Retired	Grid	Points
1	3		(United Kingdom) James Thompson	Alfa Romeo Racing Team	Alfa Romeo 156	9	18:13.906	2	10
2	43		(Germany) Dirk Müller	BMW Team Deutschland	BMW 320i	9	+0.530	8	8
3	5		(Spain) Antonio García	BMW Team Italy-Spain	BMW 320i	9	+0.765	4	6
4	42		(Germany) Jörg Müller	BMW Team Deutschland	BMW 320i	9	+1.248	29	5
5	1		(United Kingdom) Andy Priaulx	BMW Team UK	BMW 320i	9	+1.467	5	4
6	9		(Spain) Jordi Gené	SEAT Sport	SEAT Toledo Cupra	9	+2.470	9	3
7	4		(Italy) Alex Zanardi	BMW Team Italy-Spain	BMW 320i	9	+5.976	10	2
8	6		(Italy) Fabrizio Giovanardi	Alfa Romeo Racing Team	Alfa Romeo 156	9	+6.767	3	1
9	7		(Brazil) Augusto Farfus	Alfa Romeo Racing Team	Alfa Romeo 156	9	+8.904	6	
10	32	IT	(Germany) Marc Hennerici	Wiechers-Sport	BMW 320i	9	+18.231	13	
11	55	IT	(Italy) Alessandro Balzan	Scuderia del Girasole	SEAT Toledo Cupra	9	+24.527	18	
12	33	IT	(Czech Republic) Adam Lacko	IEP Team	Alfa Romeo 156 Gta	9	+31.611	25	
13	19	IT	(Finland) Valle Mäkelä	GR Asia	SEAT Toledo Cupra	9	+31.991	32	
14	27	IT	(Italy) Adriano de Micheli	JAS Motorsport	Honda Accord Euro R	9	+32.555	21	
15	22		(Italy) Nicola Larini	Chevrolet	Chevrolet Lacetti	9	+33.545	22	
16	51	IT	(Italy) Salvatore Tavano	DB Motorsport	Alfa Romeo 156	9	+34.121	17	
17	10		(Germany) Peter Terting	SEAT Sport	SEAT Toledo Cupra	9	+37.443	11	
18	31	IT	(Italy) Giuseppe Cirò	Proteam Motorsport	BMW 320i	9	+37.480	31	
19	54	IT	(San Marino) Stefano Valli	Zerocinque Motorsport	BMW 320i	9	+42.228	27	
20	52	IT	(Italy) Andrea Larini	DB Motorsport	Alfa Romeo 156	9	+44.679	19	
21	35	IT	(Sweden) Jens Hellström	Honda Dealer Team Sweden	Honda Civic Type-R	9	+1:12.036	26	
22	30	IT	(Italy) Stefano D'Aste	Proteam Motorsport	BMW 320i	8	+1 Lap	16	
23	34	IT	(Sweden) Tomas Engström	Honda Dealer Team Sweden	Honda Accord Euro R	8	+1 Lap	14	
RET	23		(Switzerland) Alain Menu	Chevrolet	Chevrolet Lacetti	6	Engine	22	
Ret	2		(Italy) Gabriele Tarquini	Alfa Romeo Racing Team	Alfa Romeo 156	5	Spun off	7	
Ret	21		(United Kingdom) Robert Huff	Chevrolet	Chevrolet Lacetti	5	Collision	20	
Ret	53	IT	(Italy) Gianluca de Lorenzi	GDL Racing	BMW 320i	5	Collision	23	
Ret	20	IT	(Netherlands) Tom Coronel	GR Asia	SEAT Toledo Cupra	4	Mechanical	15	
Ret	26		(Italy) Roberto Colciago	JAS Motorsport	Honda Accord Euro R	4	Accident	12	
Ret	8		(Sweden) Rickard Rydell	SEAT Sport	SEAT Toledo Cupra	1	Accident	1	
Ret	15		(Germany) Thomas Jäger	Ford Hotfiel Sport	Ford Focus	0	Mechanical	28	
DNS	14		(Germany) Thomas Klenke	Ford Hotfiel Sport	Ford Focus	0		30	
DNS	28	IT	(Sweden) Carl Rosenblad	Crawford Racing	BMW 320i	0		33	

== Standings after the races ==
Drivers' Championship standings

Pos	Driver	Points
1	(Germany) Dirk Müller	18
2	(United Kingdom) James Thompson	12
3	(Spain) Antonio García	10
4	(United Kingdom) Andy Priaulx	9
5	(Italy) Gabriele Tarquini	8

Manufacturers' Championship standings

Pos	Constructor	Points
1	(Germany) BMW	29
2	(Italy) Alfa Romeo	28
3	(Spain) SEAT	15
4	(United States) Chevrolet	6
5	(United States) Ford	0

- Note: Only the top five positions are included for the drivers standings.
