= 2005 FIA WTCC Race of Germany =

2005 motorsports race

2005 Race of Germany
Race details
- Round 7 of 10 in the 2005 World Touring Car Championship at Motorsport Arena Oschersleben in Oschersleben, Germany.
- Date: August 28, 2005
- Location: Oschersleben, Germany
- Course: Motorsport Arena Oschersleben; 3.667 kilometres (2.279 mi)

Race One
- Laps: 14
Pole position
| Driver | | (United Kingdom) James Thompson | Alfa Romeo Racing Team |
| Time | | 1:31.926 | |
Podium
| First | | (United Kingdom) Andy Priaulx | BMW Team UK |
| Second | | (Sweden) Rickard Rydell | SEAT Sport |
| Third | | (Germany) Jörg Müller | BMW Team Deutschland |
Fastest Lap
| Driver | | (Germany) Jörg Müller | BMW Team Deutschland |
| Time | | 1:34.063 | |

Race Two
- Laps: 14
Podium
| First | | (Italy) Alex Zanardi | BMW Team Italy-Spain |
| Second | | (United Kingdom) Andy Priaulx | BMW Team UK |
| Third | | (Germany) Jörg Müller | BMW Team Deutschland |
Fastest Lap
| Driver | | (Italy) Gabriele Tarquini | Alfa Romeo Racing Team |
| Time | | 1:33.250 | |

The 2005 FIA WTCC Race Of Germany was the seventh round of the 2005 World Touring Car Championship season. It was held at the Motorsport Arena Oschersleben. Andy Priaulx took his first win of the season in the first race for BMW, and the second race was won by Alex Zanardi, also for BMW, at a track close to the one where he lost his legs in a crash in 2001.

== Race 1 ==
| Pos | No | | Driver | Team | Car | Laps | Time/Retired | Grid | Points |
|---|---|---|---|---|---|---|---|---|---|
| 1 | 1 | | (United Kingdom) Andy Priaulx | BMW Team UK | BMW 320i | 14 | 22:05.714 | 3 | 10 |
| 2 | 8 | | (Sweden) Rickard Rydell | SEAT Sport | SEAT Toledo Cupra | 14 | +3.238 | 5 | 8 |
| 3 | 42 | | (Germany) Jörg Müller | BMW Team Deutschland | BMW 320i | 14 | +3.355 | 11 | 6 |
| 4 | 43 | | (Germany) Dirk Müller | BMW Team Deutschland | BMW 320i | 14 | +3.640 | 8 | 5 |
| 5 | 10 | | (Germany) Peter Terting | SEAT Sport | SEAT Toledo Cupra | 14 | +4.808 | 7 | 4 |
| 6 | 29 | | (Monaco) Stéphane Ortelli | Team Oreca PlayStation | SEAT Toledo Cupra | 14 | +7.484 | 6 | 3 |
| 7 | 9 | | (Spain) Jordi Gené | SEAT Sport | SEAT León | 14 | +9.779 | 9 | 2 |
| 8 | 4 | | (Italy) Alex Zanardi | BMW Team Italy-Spain | BMW 320i | 14 | +11.367 | 15 | 1 |
| 9 | 7 | | (Brazil) Augusto Farfus | Alfa Romeo Racing Team | Alfa Romeo 156 | 14 | +11.911 | 2 | |
| 10 | 14 | | (Germany) Thomas Klenke | Ford Hotfiel Sport | Ford Focus | 14 | +12.265 | 10 | |
| 11 | 23 | | (Switzerland) Alain Menu | Chevrolet | Chevrolet Lacetti | 14 | +12.813 | 13 | |
| 12 | 16 | | (Germany) Michael Funke | Ford Hotfiel Sport | Ford Focus | 14 | +13.709 | 16 | |
| 13 | 2 | | (Italy) Gabriele Tarquini | Alfa Romeo Racing Team | Alfa Romeo 156 | 14 | +15.434 | 4 | |
| 14 | 5 | | (Spain) Antonio García | BMW Team Italy-Spain | BMW 320i | 14 | +17.343 | 14 | |
| 15 | 27 | IT | (Italy) Adriano de Micheli | JAS Motorsport | Honda Accord Euro R | 14 | +18.140 | 23 | |
| 16 | 32 | IT | (Germany) Marc Hennerici | Wiechers-Sport | BMW 320i | 14 | +20.625 | 19 | |
| 17 | 22 | | (Italy) Nicola Larini | Chevrolet | Chevrolet Lacetti | 14 | +22.955 | 20 | |
| 18 | 18 | IT | (Finland) Valle Mäkelä | GR Asia | SEAT Toledo Cupra | 14 | +23.354 | 23 | |
| 19 | 3 | | (United Kingdom) James Thompson | Alfa Romeo Racing Team | Alfa Romeo 156 | 14 | +24.434 | 1 | |
| 20 | 30 | IT | (Italy) Stefano D'Aste | Proteam Motorsport | BMW 320i | 14 | +25.346 | 22 | |
| 21 | 20 | IT | (Netherlands) Tom Coronel | GR Asia | SEAT Toledo Cupra | 14 | +27.842 | 21 | |
| 22 | 28 | IT | (Sweden) Carl Rosenblad | Crawford Racing | BMW 320i | 14 | +29.236 | 24 | |
| 23 | 21 | | (United Kingdom) Robert Huff | Chevrolet | Chevrolet Lacetti | 14 | +29.878 | 21 | |
| 24 | 31 | IT | (Italy) Giuseppe Cirò | Proteam Motorsport | BMW 320i | 14 | +42.998 | 16 | |
| 25 | 36 | IT | (Austria) Sascha Plöderl | RS-Line IPZ Racing | Ford Focus ST170 | 14 | +58.353 | 27 | |
| 26 | 6 | | (Italy) Fabrizio Giovanardi | Alfa Romeo Racing Team | Alfa Romeo 156 | 11 | +3 Laps | 12 | |
| Ret | 25 | IT | (France) Éric Hélary | Peugeot Sport Denmark | Peugeot 407 | 9 | Retirement | 26 | |

== Race 2 ==
| Pos | No | | Driver | Team | Car | Laps | Time/Retired | Grid | Points |
|---|---|---|---|---|---|---|---|---|---|
| 1 | 4 | | (Italy) Alex Zanardi | BMW Team Italy-Spain | BMW 320i | 14 | 21:59.901 | 1 | 10 |
| 2 | 1 | | (United Kingdom) Andy Priaulx | BMW Team UK | BMW 320i | 14 | +0.232 | 8 | 8 |
| 3 | 42 | | (Germany) Jörg Müller | BMW Team Deutschland | BMW 320i | 14 | +0.524 | 6 | 6 |
| 4 | 9 | | (Spain) Jordi Gené | SEAT Sport | SEAT León | 14 | +1.527 | 2 | 5 |
| 5 | 7 | | (Brazil) Augusto Farfus | Alfa Romeo Racing Team | Alfa Romeo 156 | 14 | +2.290 | 9 | 4 |
| 6 | 43 | | (Germany) Dirk Müller | BMW Team Deutschland | BMW 320i | 14 | +8.472 | 5 | 3 |
| 7 | 8 | | (Sweden) Rickard Rydell | SEAT Sport | SEAT Toledo Cupra | 14 | +10.898 | 7 | 2 |
| 8 | 23 | | (Switzerland) Alain Menu | Chevrolet | Chevrolet Lacetti | 14 | +11.022 | 11 | 1 |
| 9 | 5 | | (Spain) Antonio García | BMW Team Italy-Spain | BMW 320i | 14 | +11.397 | 14 | |
| 10 | 16 | | (Germany) Michael Funke | Ford Hotfiel Sport | Ford Focus | 14 | +11.788 | 12 | |
| 11 | 22 | | (Italy) Nicola Larini | Chevrolet | Chevrolet Lacetti | 14 | +12.978 | 17 | |
| 12 | 21 | | (United Kingdom) Robert Huff | Chevrolet | Chevrolet Lacetti | 14 | +17.015 | 23 | |
| 13 | 20 | IT | (Netherlands) Tom Coronel | GR Asia | SEAT Toledo Cupra | 14 | +18.034 | 21 | |
| 14 | 2 | | (Italy) Gabriele Tarquini | Alfa Romeo Racing Team | Alfa Romeo 156 | 14 | +18.676 | 13 | |
| 15 | 29 | | (Monaco) Stéphane Ortelli | Team Oreca PlayStation | SEAT Toledo Cupra | 14 | +21.590 | 3 | |
| 16 | 31 | IT | (Italy) Giuseppe Cirò | Proteam Motorsport | BMW 320i | 14 | +23.322 | 27 | |
| 17 | 28 | IT | (Sweden) Carl Rosenblad | Crawford Racing | BMW 320i | 14 | +28.077 | 22 | |
| 18 | 27 | IT | (Italy) Adriano de Micheli | JAS Motorsport | Honda Accord Euro R | 14 | +52.495 | 15 | |
| 19 | 30 | IT | (Italy) Stefano D'Aste | Proteam Motorsport | BMW 320i | 14 | +53.681 | 20 | |
| 20 | 14 | | (Germany) Thomas Klenke | Ford Hotfiel Sport | Ford Focus | 13 | +1 Lap | 10 | |
| 21 | 32 | IT | (Germany) Marc Hennerici | Wiechers-Sport | BMW 320i | 13 | +1 Lap | 16 | |
| 22 | 36 | IT | (Austria) Sascha Plöderl | RS-Line IPZ Racing | Ford Focus ST170 | 12 | +2 Laps | 24 | |
| Ret | 3 | | (United Kingdom) James Thompson | Alfa Romeo Racing Team | Alfa Romeo 156 | 3 | Retirement | 19 | |
| Ret | 18 | IT | (Finland) Valle Mäkelä | GR Asia | SEAT Toledo Cupra | 2 | Accident | 18 | |
| Ret | 6 | | (Italy) Fabrizio Giovanardi | Alfa Romeo Racing Team | Alfa Romeo 156 | 1 | Collision | 25 | |
| Ret | 10 | | (Germany) Peter Terting | SEAT Sport | SEAT Toledo Cupra | 1 | Damage | 4 | |
| DNS | 25 | IT | (France) Éric Hélary | Peugeot Sport Denmark | Peugeot 407 | 0 | | 26 | |

== Standings after the races ==
Drivers' Championship standings

| Pos | Driver | Points |
|---|---|---|
| 1 | (Germany) Dirk Müller | 69 |
| 2 | (United Kingdom) Andy Priaulx | 68 |
| 3 | (Italy) Fabrizio Giovanardi | 57 |
| 4 | (Germany) Jörg Müller | 45 |
| 5 | (Italy) Gabriele Tarquini | 43 |

Manufacturers' Championship standings

| Pos | Constructor | Points |
|---|---|---|
| 1 | (Germany) BMW | 193 |
| 2 | (Italy) Alfa Romeo | 164 |
| 3 | (Spain) SEAT | 136 |
| 4 | (United States) Chevrolet | 45 |
| 5 | (United States) Ford | 8 |
