= 2005 FIA WTCC Race of France =

2005 World Tour Car Championship race

2005 Race of France
Race details
- Round 2 of 10 in the 2005 World Touring Car Championship at Circuit de Nevers Magny-Cours in Magny-Cours, France.
- Date: May 1, 2005
- Location: Magny-Cours, France
- Course: Circuit de Nevers Magny-Cours; 4.411 kilometres (2.741 mi)

Race One
- Laps: 12
Pole position
Driver		(Germany) Jörg Müller	BMW Team Deutschland
Time		1:49.486	
Podium
First		(Germany) Jörg Müller	BMW Team Deutschland
Second		(United Kingdom) Andy Priaulx	BMW Team UK
Third		(Sweden) Rickard Rydell	SEAT Sport
Fastest Lap
Driver		(Germany) Jörg Müller	BMW Team Deutschland
Time		1:50.826	

Race Two
- Laps: 12
Podium
First		(Germany) Jörg Müller	BMW Team Deutschland
Second		(Germany) Dirk Müller	BMW Team Deutschland
Third		(United Kingdom) Andy Priaulx	BMW Team UK
Fastest Lap
Driver		(Germany) Jörg Müller	BMW Team Deutschland
Time		1:50.447	

The Race of France was the second round of the 2005 World Touring Car Championship season. It was held at the Circuit de Nevers Magny-Cours at Magny-Cours in France on May 1, 2005. Jörg Müller won both races, the first from pole, and the second from eighth on the reversed grid.

== Report ==
=== Qualifying ===
Jörg Müller took his first pole position of the season by topping the timesheets in the qualifying session with a time of 1:49.846 in his BMW. Rickard Rydell's SEAT qualified second with a time 0.3 seconds slower than Jörg. Young Brazilian Augusto Farfus was third on the grid in the first Alfa Romeo ahead of reigning world champion Andy Priaulx in his BMW and Gabriele Tarquini in another Alfa Romeo.

=== Race 1 ===
Jörg Müller raced into the lead from pole, and Andy Priaulx was able to jump into second demoting front-row starter Rickard Rydell down to third. Augusto Farfus, who started third had a poor start and dropped down to sixth. Jörg Müller took a god lead from Priaulx, who also had a good gap to third-placed Rydell, who had to worry about Gabriele Tarquini who was only a second behind. Antonio García battled for fifth with Augusto Farfus until Jordi Gené's SEAT overtook the Brazilian. Farfus lost momentum, allowing Dirk Müller also through, and the latter also proceeded to pass Gené, and this battle allowed García to get a comfortable gap. Jörg Müller won very comfortably, nearly three seconds ahead of Priaulx. Rydell completed the podium ahead of Tarquini, who despite staying close was unable to attack the SEAT car. García, Dirk Müller, Gené and Farfus completed the points, with the Brazilian starting on pole in the next race. Marc Hennerici won the Independent's Trophy with a 13th-place finish.

=== Race 2 ===
The reverse grid saw Farfus on pole, and he converted it into an early race lead, but however Gené who had started second was swamped by the BMW's and Tarquini's Alfa. At the end on lap 1, Farfus led from Dirk Müller, García, Tarquini, Jörg Müller, Gené, Priaulx who had not gained any spots from 7th, and James Thompson in another factory Alfa. Farfus continued to lead but Jörg Müller was starting to fight his way up, passing Tarquini on lap 2 and García a lap later. The pressure from Dirk Müller to Farfus increased lap after lap, and Farfus made a mistake dropping him from the lead to fifth. Jörg Müller then passed teammate Dirk to take the lead and then pulled away at a rate of knots. Dirk ran second, with García close behind, but Tarquini dropped away. Soon Farfus and Priaulx were past, and the reigning champion then passed Farfus as well to make it a BMW 1-2-3-4. He was not finished yet, and after closing up on Dirk Müller and García, took third from the Spaniard and then attacked Dirk. Well ahead of them now, Jörg Müller won again to make it a double with Dirk holding off Priaulx and García to finish second, as BMW finished 1-2-3-4. Farfus had to settle to fifth, and Gené took sixth from a fading Tarquini, who was also passed by countryman and Alfa teammate Fabrizio Giovanardi near the end. Tom Coronel won the Independent's Trophy after finishing 14th, but he was disqualified for his car not complying with ride height regulations, and the Independent's Trophy went to Carl Rosenblad.

== Classification ==
=== Race 1 ===
Pos	No		Driver	Team	Car	Laps	Time/Retired	Grid	Points
1	42		(Germany) Jörg Müller	BMW Team Deutschland	BMW 320i	12	22:19.545	1	10
2	1		(United Kingdom) Andy Priaulx	BMW Team UK	BMW 320i	12	+2.882	4	8
3	8		(Sweden) Rickard Rydell	SEAT Sport	SEAT Toledo Cupra	12	+7.253	2	6
4	2		(Italy) Gabriele Tarquini	Alfa Romeo Racing Team	Alfa Romeo 156	12	+8.334	5	5
5	5		(Spain) Antonio García	BMW Team Italy-Spain	BMW 320i	12	+9.899	6	4
6	43		(Germany) Dirk Müller	BMW Team Deutschland	BMW 320i	12	+12.912	9	3
7	9		(Spain) Jordi Gené	SEAT Sport	SEAT Toledo Cupra	12	+14.115	8	2
8	7		(Brazil) Augusto Farfus	Alfa Romeo Racing Team	Alfa Romeo 156	12	+15.667	3	1
9	10		(Germany) Peter Terting	SEAT Sport	SEAT Toledo Cupra	12	+19.453	7	
10	6		(Italy) Fabrizio Giovanardi	Alfa Romeo Racing Team	Alfa Romeo 156	12	+19.587	11	
11	3		(United Kingdom) James Thompson	Alfa Romeo Racing Team	Alfa Romeo 156	12	+23.991	10	
12	26		(Italy) Roberto Colciago	JAS Motorsport	Honda Accord Euro R	12	+24.812	13	
13	32	IT	(Germany) Marc Hennerici	Wiechers-Sport	BMW 320i	12	+26.543	20	
14	28	IT	(Sweden) Carl Rosenblad	Crawford Racing	BMW 320i	12	+28.060	16	
15	4		(Italy) Alessandro Zanardi	BMW Team Italy-Spain	BMW 320i	12	+35.192	14	
16	19	IT	(Finland) Valle Mäkelä	GR Asia	SEAT Toledo Cupra	12	+35.755	12	
17	22		(Italy) Nicola Larini	Chevrolet	Chevrolet Lacetti	12	+38.495	18	
18	51	IT	(Italy) Salvatore Tavano	DB Motorsport	Alfa Romeo 156	12	+41.644	19	
19	21		(United Kingdom) Robert Huff	Chevrolet	Chevrolet Lacetti	12	+44.208	27	
20	53	IT	(Italy) Gianluca de Lorenzi	GDL Racing	BMW 320i	12	+47.620	32	
21	31	IT	(Italy) Giuseppe Cirò	Proteam Motorsport	BMW 320i	12	+47.792	24	
22	27	IT	(Italy) Adriano de Micheli	JAS Motorsport	Honda Accord Euro R	12	+48.627	26	
23	20	IT	(Netherlands) Tom Coronel	GR Asia	SEAT Toledo Cupra	12	+52.701	23	
24	15		(Germany) Thomas Jäger	Ford Hotfiel Sport	Ford Focus	12	+59.186	33	
25	54	IT	(San Marino) Stefano Valli	Zerocinque Motorsport	BMW 320i	12	+1:08.383	29	
Ret	14		(Germany) Thomas Klenke	Ford Hotfiel Sport	Ford Focus	8	Accident	31	
Ret	55	IT	(Italy) Alessandro Balzan	Scuderia del Girasole	SEAT Toledo Cupra	4	Collision	17	
Ret	52	IT	(Italy) Andrea Larini	DB Motorsport	Alfa Romeo 156	4	Collision	21	
NC	36	IT	(Austria) Sascha Plöderl	RS-Line IPZ Racing	Ford Focus ST170	3	Driveshaft	30	
Ret	23		(Switzerland) Alain Menu	Chevrolet	Chevrolet Lacetti	0	Collision	15	
Ret	33	IT	(Czech Republic) Adam Lacko	IEP Team	BMW 320i	0	Spun off	22	
Ret	30	IT	(Italy) Stefano D'Aste	Proteam Motorsport	BMW 320i	0	Collision	25	
DNS	37	IT	(Germany) Frank Diefenbacher	RS-Line IPZ Racing	Ford Focus ST170			28	

=== Race 2 ===
Pos	No		Driver	Team	Car	Laps	Time/Retired	Grid	Points
1	42		(Germany) Jörg Müller	BMW Team Deutschland	BMW 320i	12	22:23.707	8	10
2	43		(Germany) Dirk Müller	BMW Team Deutschland	BMW 320i	12	+5.003	3	8
3	1		(United Kingdom) Andy Priaulx	BMW Team UK	BMW 320i	12	+5.171	7	6
4	5		(Spain) Antonio García	BMW Team Italy-Spain	BMW 320i	12	+5.480	4	5
5	7		(Brazil) Augusto Farfus	Alfa Romeo Racing Team	Alfa Romeo 156	12	+6.034	1	4
6	9		(Spain) Jordi Gené	SEAT Sport	SEAT Toledo Cupra	12	+8.879	2	3
7	6		(Italy) Fabrizio Giovanardi	Alfa Romeo Racing Team	Alfa Romeo 156	12	+10.538	10	2
8	2		(Italy) Gabriele Tarquini	Alfa Romeo Racing Team	Alfa Romeo 156	12	+10.828	5	1
9	3		(United Kingdom) James Thompson	Alfa Romeo Racing Team	Alfa Romeo 156	12	+17.135	11	
10	10		(Germany) Peter Terting	SEAT Sport	SEAT Toledo Cupra	12	+19.057	9	
11	8		(Sweden) Rickard Rydell	SEAT Sport	SEAT Toledo Cupra	12	+21.256	6	
12	26		(Italy) Roberto Colciago	JAS Motorsport	Honda Accord Euro R	12	+22.527	12	
13	22		(Italy) Nicola Larini	Chevrolet	Chevrolet Lacetti	12	+23.794	17	
15	28	IT	(Sweden) Carl Rosenblad	Crawford Racing	BMW 320i	12	+26.152	14	
16	21		(United Kingdom) Robert Huff	Chevrolet	Chevrolet Lacetti	12	+27.392	19	
17	32	IT	(Germany) Marc Hennerici	Wiechers-Sport	BMW 320i	12	+28.849	13	
18	31	IT	(Italy) Giuseppe Cirò	Proteam Motorsport	BMW 320i	12	+29.162	21	
19	51	IT	(Italy) Salvatore Tavano	DB Motorsport	Alfa Romeo 156	12	+31.718	18	
20	53	IT	(Italy) Gianluca de Lorenzi	GDL Racing	BMW 320i	12	+32.314	20	
21	27	IT	(Italy) Adriano de Micheli	JAS Motorsport	Honda Accord Euro R	12	+32.902	22	
22	15		(Germany) Thomas Jäger	Ford Hotfiel Sport	Ford Focus	12	+38.381	24	
23	14		(Germany) Thomas Klenke	Ford Hotfiel Sport	Ford Focus	12	+39.227	30	
24	54	IT	(San Marino) Stefano Valli	Zerocinque Motorsport	BMW 320i	12	+52.259	25	
25	4		(Italy) Alessandro Zanardi	BMW Team Italy-Spain	BMW 320i	12	+53.862	15	
26	36	IT	(Austria) Sascha Plöderl	RS-Line IPZ Racing	Ford Focus ST170	10	Retired	27	
Ret	19	IT	(Finland) Valle Mäkelä	GR Asia	SEAT Toledo Cupra	4	Collision	16	
DNS	55	IT	(Italy) Alessandro Balzan	Scuderia del Girasole	SEAT Toledo Cupra			26	
DNS	23		(Switzerland) Alain Menu	Chevrolet	Chevrolet Lacetti			28	
DNS	30	IT	(Italy) Stefano D'Aste	Proteam Motorsport	BMW 320i			29	
DNS	33	IT	(Czech Republic) Adam Lacko	IEP Team	BMW 320i			32	
DNS	37	IT	(Germany) Frank Diefenbacher	RS-Line IPZ Racing	Ford Focus ST170			33	
DSQ	20	IT	(Netherlands) Tom Coronel	GR Asia	SEAT Toledo Cupra	12	Disqualified	23	

- Note: Tom Coronel was disqualified from 14th as his car failed to comply with the ride height. No driver was given 14th.

== Standings after the races ==
Drivers' Championship standings

Pos	Driver	Points
1	(Germany) Dirk Müller	29
2	(Germany) Jörg Müller	25
3	(United Kingdom) Andy Priaulx	23
4	(Spain) Antonio García	19
5	(Italy) Gabriele Tarquini	14

Manufacturers' Championship standings

Pos	Constructor	Points
1	(Germany) BMW	65
2	(Italy) Alfa Romeo	46
3	(Spain) SEAT	33
4	(United States) Chevrolet	12
5	(United States) Ford	0

- Note: Only the top five positions are included for the drivers standings.
