= 2005 FIA WTCC Race of Mexico =

2005 Race of Mexico
Race details
- Round 5 of 10 in the 2005 World Touring Car Championship at Autódromo Miguel E. Abed in Puebla, Mexico.
- Date: June 26, 2005
- Location: Puebla, Mexico
- Course: Autódromo Miguel E. Abed; 3.130 kilometres (1.945 mi)

Race One
- Laps: 17
Pole position
Driver		(Italy) Fabrizio Giovanardi	Alfa Romeo Racing Team
Time		1:29.993	
Podium
First		(Italy) Fabrizio Giovanardi	Alfa Romeo Racing Team
Second		(Italy) Gabriele Tarquini	Alfa Romeo Racing Team
Third		(Sweden) Rickard Rydell	SEAT Sport
Fastest Lap
Driver		(Italy) Gabriele Tarquini	Alfa Romeo Racing Team
Time		1:30.587	

Race Two
- Laps: 17
Podium
First		(Germany) Peter Terting	SEAT Sport
Second		(Spain) Antonio García	BMW Team Italy-Spain
Third		(Italy) Fabrizio Giovanardi	Alfa Romeo Racing Team
Fastest Lap
Driver		(Italy) Fabrizio Giovanardi	Alfa Romeo Racing Team
Time		1:30.867	

The 2005 FIA WTCC Race Of Mexico was the fifth round of the 2005 World Touring Car Championship season. It was held at the Autódromo Miguel E. Abed. Fabrizio Giovanardi won the first race from pole position for Alfa Romeo, and Peter Terting took his first and only WTCC win in the second race, which also turned out to be SEAT's second win.

== Report ==
=== Qualifying ===
Roberto Colciago took a shock pole position driving for Honda with a time of 1:29.830, with Peter Terting's SEAT very close behind. Fabrizio Giovanardi qualified third for Alfa Romeo, leading an Alfa quartet of Augusto Farfus, James Thompson and Gabriele Tarquini. However, Colciago, Terting and Farfus all had ten-place grid penalties for incidents in Imola and an engine change. The biggest shock in qualifying was that none of the factory BMWs qualified in the top ten. The first BMW was Antonio García in 11th, with reigning champion Andy Priaulx only 15th but still a spot ahead of championship leader Dirk Müller. Jörg Müller crashed heavily in practice and did not take part after that in the weekend due to a heavily damaged car.

=== Race 1 ===
Roberto Colciago, Peter Terting and Augusto Farfus, who qualified on pole, 2nd and 4th respectively all suffered ten-place grid penalties, Terting for an engine change and the other two for dangerous driving in the previous race at Imola. Alfa Romeo, despite Farfus's penalty gratefully accepted that as their drivers Fabrizio Giovanardi, James Thompson and Gabriele Tarquini to start at the front. They maintained their positions early on, with Giovanardi leading Thompson and Tarquini, with Jordi Gené and Rickard Rydell following them in two SEATS, and Antonio García keeping BMW in the points. Gené crashed out on the second lap, leaving the three Alfas with a large 4.5 second gap after just 2 laps. Thompson stayed with Giovanardi in the early stages, however he lost pace as the race progressed, and was passed by Tarquini on lap 5. Thompson then had the rest of the pack close up on him, whereas Giovanardi and Tarquini continued to drive away at a rate of knots. Meanwhile, Roberto Colciago was on a charge after his penalty, jumping up from 11th to 5th after 3 laps. He then passed Rydell for fourth and was attacking third-placed Thompson when his gearbox broke and he had to retire. Robert Huff was in the points for Chevrolet, and a late race pass on Peter Terting put him up to a sensational 6th, and on the last lap Rydell passed Thompson to take third. Giovanardi took his second win in two weekends, with teammate Tarquini close behind. Rydell completed the podium, a massive 11 seconds behind, with Thompson, García, Huff, Terting and Tom Coronel, the latter of whom won the Independent's Trophy. Dirk Müller and Andy Priaulx, first and second in the championship finished well out of the points in their BMWs.

=== Race 2 ===
Independent driver Tom Coronel started on pole after finishing eighth in Race 1, however it was Peter Terting who took the lead at the start followed by García. Coronel, Thompson, Huff, Rydell, Giovanardi and Jason Plato in a factory SEAT completed the top 8, whereas Tarquini and Alex Zanardi's BMW collided, taking both out of the race. The front two started to pull away but Thompson soon got up to third and joined in, and his teammate Giovanardi passed Rydell and Huff on lap 2 before passing Coronel a lap later to get 4th; however he was 4 seconds behind the top three. Terting led with García and Thompson close behind, until an overtaking attempt by Thompson on García saw them bang wheels and go off the track, with García still rejoining second, but having lost time to Terting, while Thompson lost a place to Giovanardi.

== Classification ==
=== Race 1 ===
Pos	No		Driver	Team	Car	Laps	Time/Retired	Grid	Points
1	6		(Italy) Fabrizio Giovanardi	Alfa Romeo Racing Team	Alfa Romeo 156	17	26:06.219	1	10
2	2		(Italy) Gabriele Tarquini	Alfa Romeo Racing Team	Alfa Romeo 156	17	+2.172	3	8
3	8		(Sweden) Rickard Rydell	SEAT Sport	SEAT Toledo Cupra	17	+11.525	5	6
4	3		(United Kingdom) James Thompson	Alfa Romeo Racing Team	Alfa Romeo 156	17	+13.298	2	5
5	5		(Spain) Antonio García	BMW Team Italy-Spain	BMW 320i	17	+13.772	7	4
6	21		(United Kingdom) Robert Huff	Chevrolet	Chevrolet Lacetti	17	+15.658	6	3
7	10		(Germany) Peter Terting	SEAT Sport	SEAT Toledo Cupra	17	+18.554	12	2
8	20	IT	(Netherlands) Tom Coronel	GR Asia	SEAT Toledo Cupra	17	+21.880	9	1
9	7		(Brazil) Augusto Farfus	Alfa Romeo Racing Team	Alfa Romeo 156	17	+24.487	14	
10	22		(Italy) Nicola Larini	Chevrolet	Chevrolet Lacetti	17	+25.072	10	
11	11		(United Kingdom) Jason Plato	SEAT Sport	SEAT Toledo Cupra	17	+25.390	20	
12	30	IT	(Italy) Stefano D'Aste	Proteam Motorsport	BMW 320i	17	+26.260	16	
13	4		(Italy) Alex Zanardi	BMW Team Italy-Spain	BMW 320i	17	+27.351	19	
14	31	IT	(Italy) Giuseppe Cirò	Proteam Motorsport	BMW 320i	17	+27.891	17	
15	18	IT	(Mexico) Carlos Mastretta	GR Asia	SEAT Toledo Cupra	17	+32.664	18	
16	28	IT	(Sweden) Carl Rosenblad	Crawford Racing	BMW 320i	17	+35.650	22	
17	32	IT	(Germany) Marc Hennerici	Wiechers-Sport	BMW 320i	17	+39.301	21	
18	43		(Germany) Dirk Müller	BMW Team Deutschland	BMW 320i	12	+5 Laps	15	
NC	1		(United Kingdom) Andy Priaulx	BMW Team UK	BMW 320i	11	+6 Laps	13	
Ret	26		(Italy) Roberto Colciago	JAS Motorsport	Honda Accord Euro R	10	Gearbox	11	
NC	23		(Switzerland) Alain Menu	Chevrolet	Chevrolet Lacetti	7	+10 Laps	8	
Ret	9		(Spain) Jordi Gené	SEAT Sport	SEAT Toledo Cupra	1	Accident	4	
DNS	27	IT	(Italy) Adriano de Micheli	JAS Motorsport	Honda Accord Euro R	0		23	
DNS	42		(Germany) Jörg Müller	BMW Team Deutschland	BMW 320i	0		24	

=== Race 2 ===
Pos	No		Driver	Team	Car	Laps	Time/Retired	Grid	Points
1	10		(Germany) Peter Terting	SEAT Sport	SEAT Toledo Cupra	17	26:10.825	2	10
2	5		(Spain) Antonio García	BMW Team Italy-Spain	BMW 320i	17	+0.693	4	8
3	6		(Italy) Fabrizio Giovanardi	Alfa Romeo Racing Team	Alfa Romeo 156	17	+7.578	8	6
4	3		(United Kingdom) James Thompson	Alfa Romeo Racing Team	Alfa Romeo 156	17	+11.621	5	5
5	20	IT	(Netherlands) Tom Coronel	GR Asia	SEAT Toledo Cupra	17	+13.038	1	4
6	8		(Sweden) Rickard Rydell	SEAT Sport	SEAT Toledo Cupra	17	+13.630	6	3
7	22		(Italy) Nicola Larini	Chevrolet	Chevrolet Lacetti	17	+17.091	10	2
8	1		(United Kingdom) Andy Priaulx	BMW Team UK	BMW 320i	17	+17.543	18	1
9	31	IT	(Italy) Giuseppe Cirò	Proteam Motorsport	BMW 320i	17	+21.098	14	
10	7		(Brazil) Augusto Farfus	Alfa Romeo Racing Team	Alfa Romeo 156	17	+21.704	9	
11	30	IT	(Italy) Stefano D'Aste	Proteam Motorsport	BMW 320i	17	+23.079	12	
12	11		(United Kingdom) Jason Plato	SEAT Sport	SEAT Toledo Cupra	17	+23.822	11	
13	23		(Switzerland) Alain Menu	Chevrolet	Chevrolet Lacetti	17	+25.176	19	
14	32	IT	(Germany) Marc Hennerici	Wiechers-Sport	BMW 320i	17	+28.942	17	
15	28	IT	(Sweden) Carl Rosenblad	Crawford Racing	BMW 320i	17	+29.373	16	
16	43		(Germany) Dirk Müller	BMW Team Deutschland	BMW 320i	17	+30.788	22	
17	18	IT	(Mexico) Carlos Mastretta	GR Asia	SEAT Toledo Cupra	17	+34.149	15	
18	26		(Italy) Roberto Colciago	JAS Motorsport	Honda Accord Euro R	17	+37.461	21	
19	9		(Spain) Jordi Gené	SEAT Sport	SEAT Toledo Cupra	12	+5 Laps	20	
Ret	21		(United Kingdom) Robert Huff	Chevrolet	Chevrolet Lacetti	7	Accident	3	
Ret	4		(Italy) Alex Zanardi	BMW Team Italy-Spain	BMW 320i	1	Damage	13	
Ret	2		(Italy) Gabriele Tarquini	Alfa Romeo Racing Team	Alfa Romeo 156	0	Collision	7	
DNS	27	IT	(Italy) Adriano de Micheli	JAS Motorsport	Honda Accord Euro R	0		23	
DNS	42		(Germany) Jörg Müller	BMW Team Deutschland	BMW 320i	0		24	

== Standings after the races ==
Drivers' Championship standings

Pos	Driver	Points
1	(Germany) Dirk Müller	47
2	(Italy) Fabrizio Giovanardi	45
3	(United Kingdom) Andy Priaulx	42
4	(Spain) Antonio García	39
5	(Italy) Gabriele Tarquini	38

Manufacturers' Championship standings

Pos	Constructor	Points
1	(Germany) BMW	129
2	(Italy) Alfa Romeo	129
3	(Spain) SEAT	98
4	(United States) Chevrolet	32
5	(United States) Ford	2
