= Adriano de Micheli =

Italian racing driver

Adriano De Micheli
- Born: 20 June 1975 (age 51); Genova, Italy

Formula One World Championship career
- Nationality: (Italy) Italian

Adriano de Micheli (born 20 June 1975) is an Italian auto racing driver.

== Personal life ==
Adriano de Micheli was born 20 June 1975. After receiving his high school diploma he went on to study Economics at the University of Genova before dedicating himself full-time to the automobile world. In over 10 years he participated in more than 100 races, taking 27 pole positions, 44 podiums and 26 victories.

== Career ==
De Micheli competed in the Italian Super Touring Championship in 1999 with a Peugeot, winning the championship. He also participated in the Italian Super Production Championship between 2000 and 2004, winning the championship in 2004 in an Alfa Romeo 147.

De Micheli was class winner in the 24 hour race in Spa and Nurburgring and in 2005 he raced a Honda Accord for JAS Motorsport in the World Touring Car Championship., where he had two wins amongst the “Independents”.

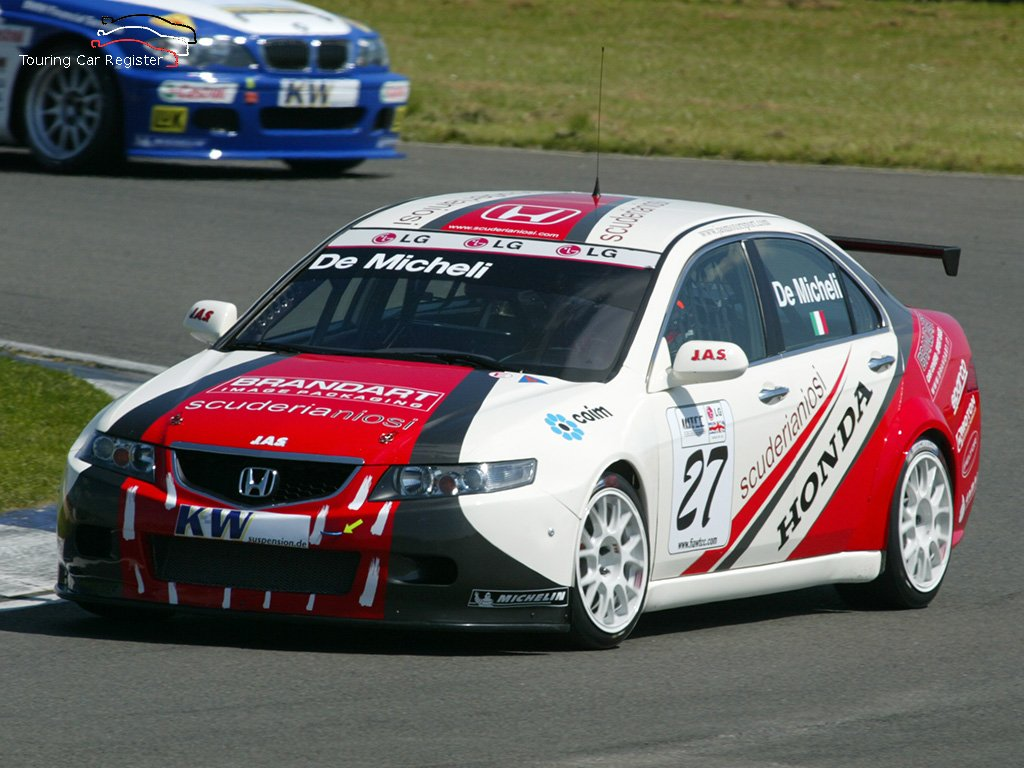
Adriano De Micheli driving the Honda Accord in the World Touring Car Championship 2005

In parallel to his racing career, in 1999, de Micheli began working as an instructor at the official Ferrari, Maserati and Alfa Romeo schools. He then continued to evolve in his teaching career representing the Ferrari and Maserati schools in various worldwide locations and directing various courses and receiving the “Best Instructor” award in 2006.

In 2012, De Micheli opened an Exotic car driving experience based within the Las Vegas Motor Speedway.

== Racing record ==
=== Complete World Touring Car Championship results ===
(key) (Races in bold indicate pole position) (Races in italics indicate fastest lap)

| Year | Team | Car | 1 | 2 | 3 | 4 | 5 | 6 | 7 | 8 | 9 | 10 | 11 | 12 | 13 | 14 | 15 | 16 | 17 | 18 | 19 | 20 | DC | Points |
|---|---|---|---|---|---|---|---|---|---|---|---|---|---|---|---|---|---|---|---|---|---|---|---|---|
| 2005 | JAS Motorsport | Honda Accord Euro R | ITA; 1; 21 | ITA; 2; 14 | FRA; 1; 22 | FRA; 2; 21 | GBR; 1; 20 | GBR; 2; 15 | SMR; 1 Ret | SMR; 2 DNS | MEX; 1 DNS | MEX; 2 DNS | BEL; 1 | BEL; 2 | GER; 1; 15 | GER; 2; 18 | TUR; 1; 15 | TUR; 2; 16 | ESP; 1; 11 | ESP; 2; 19 | MAC; 1; 15 | MAC; 2 Ret | NC | 0 |

Sporting positions
| Preceded by Salvatore Tavano | Italian Touring Car Champion; 2004 | Succeeded by Alessandro Zanardi |
