= 2005 FIA WTCC Race of UK =

Motorsport event

(United Kingdom) 2005 Race of UK
Race details
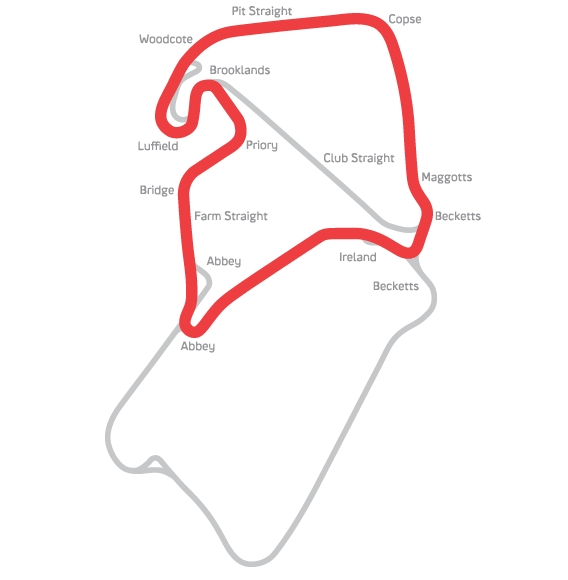
- Round 3 of 10 in the 2005 World Touring Car Championship at Silverstone Circuit in Silverstone, United Kingdom.
- Date: May 15, 2005
- Location: Silverstone, United Kingdom
- Course: Silverstone Circuit; 3.619 kilometres (2.249 mi)

Race One
- Laps: 14
Pole position
Driver		(Italy) Gabriele Tarquini	Alfa Romeo Racing Team
Time		1:25.639	
Podium
First		(Italy) Gabriele Tarquini	Alfa Romeo Racing Team
Second		(United Kingdom) James Thompson	Alfa Romeo Racing Team
Third		(Italy) Fabrizio Giovanardi	Alfa Romeo Racing Team
Fastest Lap
Driver		(Italy) Fabrizio Giovanardi	Alfa Romeo Racing Team
Time		1:26.969	

Race Two
- Laps: 14
Podium
First		(Sweden) Rickard Rydell	SEAT Sport
Second		(United Kingdom) Jason Plato	SEAT Sport
Third		(Italy) Gabriele Tarquini	Alfa Romeo Racing Team
Fastest Lap
Driver		(United Kingdom) Andy Priaulx	BMW Team UK
Time		1:26.730	

The Race of UK was the third round of the 2005 World Touring Car Championship season. It was held at the Silverstone Circuit at Silverstone in Britain on May 15, 2005. Gabriele Tarquini won the first race from pole in an Alfa Romeo 1-2-3-4, and Rickard Rydell took a historic first win for SEAT after Andy Priaulx's tyre burst with three laps to go while leading.

== Report ==
=== Qualifying ===
After BMW's domination in Magny-Cours, Alfa Romeo fought back here by taking the first three places in qualifying. Gabriele Tarquini took pole for them, with teammates James Thompson and Fabrizio Giovanardi close behind him. Andy Priaulx was the first of the BMWs in fourth, and Peter Terting got his best qualifying for SEAT in fifth.

=== Race 1 ===
Pole position man Gabriele Tarquini took off at the start in his Alfa Romeo, with Andy Priaulx jumping up to second from fourth in his home race. Fabrizio Giovanardi, James Thompson and Augusto Farfus followed in three more Alfas. The Alfas set about their task, with Giovanardi getting second from Priaulx before the first lap was complete, with Thompson and Farfus following him soon after, but this allowed Tarquini to quickly get a 1.5 second lead. Behind the top 5, Antonio García was running sixth ahead of the SEATS of Peter Terting and Jason Plato. Giovanardi was unable to close in on Tarquini, despite not allowing his countryman to pull further away. The former was passed by Thompson on lap 4, and the Brit began to close in on Tarquini, with Giovanardi in tow. Priaulx stayed with the Alfas in the early stages, but then got dropped. García now suffered from problems, and was passed by the SEATS of Terting, Plato and Rickard Rydell. At the front, Thompson was unable to pass Tarquini despite putting him under pressure. Tarquini thus took the win with Thompson, Giovanardi and Farfus completing the Alfa 1-2-3-4 ahead of Priaulx's BMW and the three SEATS driven by Terting, Rydell and Plato. The Independent's Trophy was won by Tom Coronel who finished 14th.

=== Race 2 ===
SEAT cars of Plato, Rydell and Terting started 1-2-3 on the reverse grid, but however it was Priaulx who overtook all three of them at the start to take the lead, with Dirk Müller sensationally jumping from 10th to 4th in his BMW as Fabrizio Giovanardi stalled and resumed in last. A collision between García and Robert Huff's Chevrolet brought out the safety car. The race restarted after 3 laps with Priaulx leading Rydell, Plato, Dirk Müller, Terting, Farfus, Tarquini and Thompson. Priaulx kept his lead but Rydell stayed right with him, whereas Plato was unable to and had to defend from Dirk Müller. Farfus quickly dealt with Terting, and as Tarquini tried to do these same, Thompson sneaked up on both of them. There was contact, and Thompson was sent spinning into the gravel and retired. Priaulx continued to lead with Rydell putting him under pressure; but with 3 laps left, Priaulx suffered a puncture and retired. Rydell gratefully took the lead, with Plato and Dirk Müller following, but soon Tarquini and Farfus passed Dirk. Jordi Gené also did the same in his SEAT, and behind him Jörg Müller took 7th from Terting, clipping the latter into a spin. Rydell took his first career win, with Plato completing a SEAT 1-2 by holding off Tarquini and Farfus. Gene, Dirk and Jörg Müller followed, with Giovanardi recovering to take the final point. Marc Hennerici took his fourth Independents Trophy by finishing 9th.

== Classification ==
=== Race 1 ===
Pos	No		Driver	Team	Car	Laps	Time/Retired	Grid	Points
1	2		(Italy) Gabriele Tarquini	Alfa Romeo Racing Team	Alfa Romeo 156	14	20:35.654	1	10
2	3		(United Kingdom) James Thompson	Alfa Romeo Racing Team	Alfa Romeo 156	14	+1.287	2	8
3	6		(Italy) Fabrizio Giovanardi	Alfa Romeo Racing Team	Alfa Romeo 156	14	+1.626	3	6
4	7		(Brazil) Augusto Farfus	Alfa Romeo Racing Team	Alfa Romeo 156	14	+1.924	6	5
5	1		(United Kingdom) Andy Priaulx	BMW Team UK	BMW 320i	14	+4.386	4	4
6	10		(Germany) Peter Terting	SEAT Sport	SEAT Toledo Cupra	14	+5.595	5	3
7	8		(Sweden) Rickard Rydell	SEAT Sport	SEAT Toledo Cupra	14	+6.095	8	2
8	11		(United Kingdom) Jason Plato	SEAT Sport	SEAT Toledo Cupra	14	+10.187	7	1
9	42		(Germany) Jörg Müller	BMW Team Deutschland	BMW 320i	14	+11.611	11	
10	43		(Germany) Dirk Müller	BMW Team Deutschland	BMW 320i	14	+12.170	25	
11	9		(Spain) Jordi Gené	SEAT Sport	SEAT Toledo Cupra	14	+13.542	10	
12	26		(Italy) Roberto Colciago	JAS Motorsport	Honda Accord Euro R	14	+17.103	12	
13	21		(United Kingdom) Robert Huff	Chevrolet	Chevrolet Lacetti	14	+21.842	18	
14	20	IT	(Netherlands) Tom Coronel	GR Asia	SEAT Toledo Cupra	14	+22.195	13	
15	5		(Spain) Antonio García	BMW Team Italy-Spain	BMW 320i	14	+26.590	9	
16	19	IT	(Finland) Valle Mäkelä	GR Asia	SEAT Toledo Cupra	14	+27.621	20	
17	32	IT	(Germany) Marc Hennerici	Wiechers-Sport	BMW 320i	14	+34.754	23	
18	15		(Germany) Thomas Jäger	Ford Hotfiel Sport	Ford Focus	14	+38.982	26	
19	14		(Germany) Thomas Klenke	Ford Hotfiel Sport	Ford Focus	14	+39.293	24	
20	27	IT	(Italy) Adriano de Micheli	JAS Motorsport	Honda Accord Euro R	14	+39.547	21	
21	28	IT	(Sweden) Carl Rosenblad	Crawford Racing	BMW 320i	14	+40.512	19	
22	31	IT	(Italy) Giuseppe Cirò	Proteam Motorsport	BMW 320i	14	+40.708	22	
23	4		(Italy) Alex Zanardi	BMW Team Italy-Spain	BMW 320i	13	Collision	14	
Ret	30	IT	(Italy) Stefano D'Aste	Proteam Motorsport	BMW 320i	4	Retirement	17	
Ret	23		(Switzerland) Alain Menu	Chevrolet	Chevrolet Lacetti	0	Collision	15	
Ret	22		(Italy) Nicola Larini	Chevrolet	Chevrolet Lacetti	0	Collision	16	

=== Race 2 ===
Pos	No		Driver	Team	Car	Laps	Time/Retired	Grid	Points
1	8		(Sweden) Rickard Rydell	SEAT Sport	SEAT Toledo Cupra	14	21:43.465	2	10
2	11		(United Kingdom) Jason Plato	SEAT Sport	SEAT Toledo Cupra	14	+4.709	1	8
3	2		(Italy) Gabriele Tarquini	Alfa Romeo Racing Team	Alfa Romeo 156	14	+5.049	8	6
4	7		(Brazil) Augusto Farfus	Alfa Romeo Racing Team	Alfa Romeo 156	14	+5.557	5	5
5	9		(Spain) Jordi Gené	SEAT Sport	SEAT Toledo Cupra	14	+6.712	11	4
6	43		(Germany) Dirk Müller	BMW Team Deutschland	BMW 320i	14	+7.239	10	3
7	42		(Germany) Jörg Müller	BMW Team Deutschland	BMW 320i	14	+14.616	9	2
8	6		(Italy) Fabrizio Giovanardi	Alfa Romeo Racing Team	Alfa Romeo 156	14	+19.599	6	1
9	32	IT	(Germany) Marc Hennerici	Wiechers-Sport	BMW 320i	14	+23.685	17	
10	19	IT	(Finland) Valle Mäkelä	GR Asia	SEAT Toledo Cupra	14	+23.973	16	
11	31	IT	(Italy) Giuseppe Cirò	Proteam Motorsport	BMW 320i	14	+24.464	22	
12	28	IT	(Sweden) Carl Rosenblad	Crawford Racing	BMW 320i	14	+25.124	21	
13	23		(Switzerland) Alain Menu	Chevrolet	Chevrolet Lacetti	14	+25.422	26	
14	20	IT	(Netherlands) Tom Coronel	GR Asia	SEAT Toledo Cupra	14	+27.095	14	
15	27	IT	(Italy) Adriano de Micheli	JAS Motorsport	Honda Accord Euro R	14	+27.140	20	
16	10		(Germany) Peter Terting	SEAT Sport	SEAT Toledo Cupra	14	+27.627	3	
17	15		(Germany) Thomas Jäger	Ford Hotfiel Sport	Ford Focus	14	+31.330	18	
18	14		(Germany) Thomas Klenke	Ford Hotfiel Sport	Ford Focus	14	+32.167	19	
19	26		(Italy) Roberto Colciago	JAS Motorsport	Honda Accord Euro R	14	+49.941	12	
20	1		(United Kingdom) Andy Priaulx	BMW Team UK	BMW 320i	11	Puncture	4	
Ret	30	IT	(Italy) Stefano D'Aste	Proteam Motorsport	BMW 320i	5	Retirement	24	
Ret	3		(United Kingdom) James Thompson	Alfa Romeo Racing Team	Alfa Romeo 156	3	Collision	7	
Ret	21		(United Kingdom) Robert Huff	Chevrolet	Chevrolet Lacetti	0	Collision	13	
Ret	5		(Spain) Antonio García	BMW Team Italy-Spain	BMW 320i	0	Collision	15	
DNS	4		(Italy) Alex Zanardi	BMW Team Italy-Spain	BMW 320i	0		23	
DNS	22		(Italy) Nicola Larini	Chevrolet	Chevrolet Lacetti	0		25	

== Standings after the races ==
Drivers' Championship standings

Pos	Driver	Points
1	(Germany) Dirk Müller	32
2	(Italy) Gabriele Tarquini	30
3	(Germany) Jörg Müller	27
4	(United Kingdom) Andy Priaulx	27
5	(Brazil) Augusto Farfus	21

Manufacturers' Championship standings

Pos	Constructor	Points
1	(Germany) BMW	81
2	(Italy) Alfa Romeo	75
3	(Spain) SEAT	60
4	(United States) Chevrolet	16
5	(United States) Ford	2
