= 2005 Guia Race of Macau =

2005 Race of Macau
Race details
- Round 10 of 10 in the 2005 World Touring Car Championship at Circuito da Guia in Macau, China.
- Date: November 20, 2005
- Location: Macau, China
- Course: Circuito da Guia; 6.217 kilometres (3.863 mi)

Race One
- Laps: 10
Pole position
Driver		(United Kingdom) Andy Priaulx	BMW Team UK
Time		2:31.712	
Podium
First		(Brazil) Augusto Farfus	Alfa Romeo Racing Team
Second		(United Kingdom) Andy Priaulx	BMW Team UK
Third		(Sweden) Rickard Rydell	SEAT Sport
Fastest Lap
Driver		(United Kingdom) Andy Priaulx	BMW Team UK
Time		2:33.903	

Race Two
- Laps: 11
Podium
First		(Netherlands) Duncan Huisman	BMW Team Holland
Second		(United Kingdom) Andy Priaulx	BMW Team UK
Third		(Brazil) Augusto Farfus	Alfa Romeo Racing Team
Fastest Lap
Driver		(United Kingdom) Andy Priaulx	BMW Team UK
Time		2:33.757	

The 2005 Guia Race Of Macau was the final of the 2005 World Touring Car Championship season. It was held at the Circuito da Guia. Augusto Farfus won the first race for Alfa Romeo, the race being Farfus's first win in the series. The second race was a crash-strewn affair, won in the end by Duncan Huisman. Andy Priaulx won the inaugural FIA WTCC world championship after finishing 2nd in both races.

== Race 1 ==
Pos	No		Driver	Team	Car	Laps	Time/Retired	Grid	Points
1	7		(Brazil) Augusto Farfus	Alfa Romeo Racing Team	Alfa Romeo 156	10	42:11.373	3	10
2	1		(United Kingdom) Andy Priaulx	BMW Team UK	BMW 320i	10	+0.496	1	8
3	8		(Sweden) Rickard Rydell	SEAT Sport	SEAT León	10	+1.698	7	6
4	22		(Italy) Nicola Larini	Chevrolet	Chevrolet Lacetti	10	+4.427	5	5
5	23		(Switzerland) Alain Menu	Chevrolet	Chevrolet Lacetti	10	+13.706	8	4
6	41		(Netherlands) Duncan Huisman	BMW Team Holland	BMW 320i	10	+14.287	16	3
7	3		(United Kingdom) James Thompson	Alfa Romeo Racing Team	Alfa Romeo 156	10	+14.440	17	2
8	10		(Germany) Peter Terting	SEAT Sport	SEAT León	10	+15.172	20	1
9	5		(Spain) Antonio García	BMW Team Italy-Spain	BMW 320i	10	+16.756	12	
10	43		(Germany) Dirk Müller	BMW Team Deutschland	BMW 320i	10	+20.882	6	
11	30	IT	(Italy) Stefano D'Aste	Proteam Motorsport	BMW 320i	10	+25.039	21	
12	28	IT	(Sweden) Carl Rosenblad	Crawford Racing	BMW 320i	10	+31.965	18	
13	4		(Italy) Alex Zanardi	BMW Team Italy-Spain	BMW 320i	10	+32.574	25	
14	32	IT	(Germany) Marc Hennerici	Wiechers-Sport	BMW 320i	10	+39.276	24	
15	27	IT	(Italy) Adriano de Micheli	JAS Motorsport	Honda Accord Euro R	10	+43.148	23	
16	64		(New Zealand) Peter Scharmach	Engstler Motorsport	BMW 320i	10	+43.995	27	
17	16		(Germany) Michael Funke	Ford Hotfiel Sport	Ford Focus	9	+1 Lap	26	
18	9		(Spain) Jordi Gené	SEAT Sport	SEAT León	9	+1 Lap	15	
19	6		(Italy) Fabrizio Giovanardi	Alfa Romeo Racing Team	Alfa Romeo 156	8	+2 Laps	9	
20	39	IT	(United Kingdom) Simon Harrison	JAS Motorsport	Honda Accord Euro R	8	+2 Laps	22	
21	17		(Germany) Patrick Bernhardt	Ford Hotfiel Sport	Ford Focus	7	+3 Laps	19	
Ret	56		(Macau) André Couto	Alfa Romeo Racing Team	Alfa Romeo 156	2	Accident	2	
Ret	21		(United Kingdom) Robert Huff	Chevrolet	Chevrolet Lacetti	0	Collision	10	
Ret	42		(Germany) Jörg Müller	BMW Team Deutschland	BMW 320i	0	Collision	11	
Ret	20	IT	(Netherlands) Tom Coronel	GR Asia	SEAT Toledo Cupra	0	Collision	13	
Ret	31	IT	(Italy) Giuseppe Cirò	Proteam Motorsport	BMW 320i	0	Collision	14	
DNS	2		(Italy) Gabriele Tarquini	Alfa Romeo Racing Team	Alfa Romeo 156	0		4	
DNS	62		(Macau) Ao Chi Hong	Ao's Racing Team	BMW 320i	0		28	
DNQ	63		(Hong Kong) Paul Poon	Engstler Motorsport	BMW 320i				
DNQ	65		(Japan) Hironori Takeuchi	Ao's Racing Team	Toyota Altezza				
DNQ	40	IT	(Hong Kong) Lo Ka Fai	GR Asia	SEAT Toledo Cupra				

== Race 2 ==
Pos	No		Driver	Team	Car	Laps	Time/Retired	Grid	Points
1	41		(Netherlands) Duncan Huisman	BMW Team Holland	BMW 320i	11	37:51.579	3	10
2	1		(United Kingdom) Andy Priaulx	BMW Team UK	BMW 320i	11	+0.257	7	8
3	7		(Brazil) Augusto Farfus	Alfa Romeo Racing Team	Alfa Romeo 156	11	+2.428	8	6
4	4		(Italy) Alex Zanardi	BMW Team Italy-Spain	BMW 320i	11	+3.179	13	5
5	9		(Spain) Jordi Gené	SEAT Sport	SEAT León	11	+3.575	18	4
6	10		(Germany) Peter Terting	SEAT Sport	SEAT León	11	+4.193	1	3
7	8		(Sweden) Rickard Rydell	SEAT Sport	SEAT León	11	+4.969	6	2
8	31	IT	(Italy) Giuseppe Cirò	Proteam Motorsport	BMW 320i	11	+36.582	25	1
9	17		(Germany) Patrick Bernhardt	Ford Hotfiel Sport	Ford Focus	11	+1:21.482	21	
10	22		(Italy) Nicola Larini	Chevrolet	Chevrolet Lacetti	9	+2 Laps	5	
Ret	27	IT	(Italy) Adriano de Micheli	JAS Motorsport	Honda Accord Euro R	4	Collision	15	
Ret	21		(United Kingdom) Robert Huff	Chevrolet	Chevrolet Lacetti	4	Collision	26	
Ret	64		(New Zealand) Peter Scharmach	Engstler Motorsport	BMW 320i	4	Collision	16	
Ret	32	IT	(Germany) Marc Hennerici	Wiechers-Sport	BMW 320i	4	Collision	14	
Ret	28	IT	(Sweden) Carl Rosenblad	Crawford Racing	BMW 320i	3	Accident	12	
Ret	43		(Germany) Dirk Müller	BMW Team Deutschland	BMW 320i	2	Accident	10	
Ret	3		(United Kingdom) James Thompson	Alfa Romeo Racing Team	Alfa Romeo 156	2	Retirement	2	
Ret	30	IT	(Italy) Stefano D'Aste	Proteam Motorsport	BMW 320i	1	Accident	11	
DNS	5		(Spain) Antonio García	BMW Team Italy-Spain	BMW 320i	0		9	
DNS	16		(Germany) Michael Funke	Ford Hotfiel Sport	Ford Focus	0		17	
DNS	6		(Italy) Fabrizio Giovanardi	Alfa Romeo Racing Team	Alfa Romeo 156	0		19	
DNS	39	IT	(United Kingdom) Simon Harrison	JAS Motorsport	Honda Accord Euro R	0		20	
DNS	56		(Macau) André Couto	Alfa Romeo Racing Team	Alfa Romeo 156	0		22	
DNS	42		(Germany) Jörg Müller	BMW Team Deutschland	BMW 320i	0		23	
DNS	20	IT	(Netherlands) Tom Coronel	GR Asia	SEAT Toledo Cupra	0		24	
DNS	2		(Italy) Gabriele Tarquini	Alfa Romeo Racing Team	Alfa Romeo 156	0		27	
DNS	62		(Macau) Ao Chi Hong	Ao's Racing Team	BMW 320i	0		28	
DSQ	23		(Switzerland) Alain Menu	Chevrolet	Chevrolet Lacetti	11	Disqualified	4	
DNQ	63		(Hong Kong) Paul Poon	Engstler Motorsport	BMW 320i				
DNQ	65		(Japan) Hironori Takeuchi	Ao's Racing Team	Toyota Altezza				
DNQ	40	IT	(Hong Kong) Lo Ka Fai	GR Asia	SEAT Toledo Cupra				

== Standings after the races ==
Drivers' Championship standings

Pos	Driver	Points
1	(United Kingdom) Andy Priaulx	101
2	(Germany) Dirk Müller	86
3	(Italy) Fabrizio Giovanardi	81
4	(Brazil) Augusto Farfus	65
5	(Germany) Jörg Müller	59

Manufacturers' Championship standings

Pos	Constructor	Points
1	(Germany) BMW	273
2	(Italy) Alfa Romeo	237
3	(Spain) SEAT	186
4	(United States) Chevrolet	68
5	(United States) Ford	13
