= Hotfiel Sport =

German auto racing team

(Germany) Hotfiel Sport
- Team principal(s): Hans Hotfiel
- Former series: World Touring Car Championship; ADAC Procar
- Drivers' Championships: 2002 ADAC Procar (Klenke)

Hotfiel Sport was an auto racing team based in Kirchlengern, Germany. In 2005 they ran two Ford Focus cars in the inaugural 2005 FIA World Touring Car Championship under the Ford Hotfiel Sport banner. The cars were built by Ford Team RS and competed as a manufacturer entry due to support from Ford.

The team started its WTCC campaign with two home-grown drivers, Thomas Klenke and Thomas Jäger. After missing out on round five at Puebla in Mexico, Jäger was replaced in the team by fellow German driver Michael Funke. For the final round in Macau, Klenke was replaced by test driver Patrick Bernhardt who had previous experience of the circuit. The cars were uncompetitive, despite an improvement later in the season, no championship points were scored. Hotfiel Sport did not return in 2006.

Hotfiel Sport had previously competed in the Deutsche Tourenwagen Challenge, winning the drivers title in 2002 with Klenke.
