= ROAL Motorsport =

Italian auto racing team

(Italy) ROAL Motorsport
- Founded: 2001
- Team principal(s): Roberto Ravaglia
- Current series: Blancpain Endurance Series; Italian GT Championship
- Former series: European Touring Car Championship; Superstars Series; World Touring Car Championship

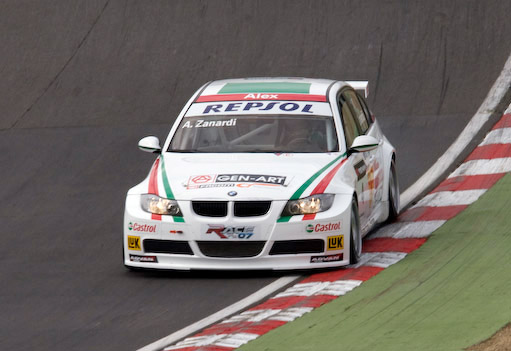
Alex Zanardi driving a ROAL Motorsport BMW 320si WTCC car at Brands Hatch in 2008

ROAL Motorsport (previously known as Ravaglia Motorsport) is an Italian auto racing team, which operated the BMW Team Italy-Spain team in the World Touring Car Championship, and currently competes as BMW Team Italia in the Italian GT Championship. It was founded in 2001 by 1987 World Touring Car champion Roberto Ravaglia and Aldo Preo (Roberto + Aldo = ROAL).

== History ==
Ravaglia Motorsport began competing in the Superproduction class of the European Super Touring Championship in 2001 as BMW Team Germany with Peter Kox and Norman Simon as drivers, with Kox winning the class.

In 2002, they competed in the European Touring Car Championship (ETCC) as BMW Team Spain with Jordi Gené and Fabrizio de Simone as drivers. In 2003, they became BMW Team Italy-Spain and had Antonio García and Fabrizio Giovanardi as drivers, with Alex Zanardi driving a third car at the season finale in Monza, using special controls following his serious accident in 2001 in which he lost both his legs. Zanardi replaced Giovanardi full-time in 2004.

In 2005, the ETCC became the World Touring Car Championship (WTCC) and Ravaglia Motorsport changed their name to ROAL Motorsport. Zanardi also won the Italian Superturismo Championship in 2005 for the team, and finished third in the first edition of the European Touring Car Cup.

Garcia left the team at the end of 2005 to pursue a career in sports car racing, and was replaced by fellow Spaniard Marcel Costa. Costa was disappointing though and was replaced by Duncan Huisman during the season. The team gave GP2 Series racer Félix Porteiro a drive in the ETC Cup and he impressed enough to get a drive in the WTCC for 2007.

In 2008, ROAL Motorsport began development of a competition M3 E90 for the Superstars Series, with Luca Rangoni as driver. For 2009, Porteiro was replaced by 2008 Independent's champion Sergio Hernández in the team, while in the Superstars Series, Rangoni was replaced by reigning Champion Gianni Morbidelli.

ROAL continued in the WTCC in 2011 with Dutch driver Tom Coronel, who had previously raced BMW machinery in the European Touring Car Championship. ROAL changed to the Chevrolet Cruze during the TC1 era, continuing until the 2017 season, when the WTCC folded.

Since 2015, ROAL Motorsport has regularly competed in the Italian GT Championship, initially with the BMW Z4 GT3 until switching to the BMW M6 GT3 in 2016. 2016 also saw ROAL compete under the BMW Team Italia name.

In 2019, the running of the team was taken over by Ceccato Motorsport.
