= N.Technology =

Car racing team

N.Technology is an Italian motor racing team, founded by Mauro Sipsz and Monica Bregoli.

== Team history ==
N.Technology (originally named Nordauto Squadra Corse or Team Nordauto) were set up to manage the worldwide sporting activities of the Fiat Group. In 1994 the name was changed to Nordauto Engineering and in 2001 to N.Technology.

=== Touring cars ===
This included designing, building and running the Alfa Romeo 156 for use in touring cars. N.Technology won seven European and five Italian Championships with Alfa Romeo, winning three consecutive European Touring Car Championship drivers' titles, with Fabrizio Giovanardi in 2001 and 2002 and with Gabriele Tarquini in 2003. The team continued to run in the World Touring Car Championship, with Fabrizio Giovanardi finishing third in 2005. In 2006 they went it alone without support from Alfa Romeo, running Augusto Farfus to third in the standings. James Thompson also finished third for the team in 2007. The team ran a Honda Accord Euro R for Thompson in 2008, but with less success.

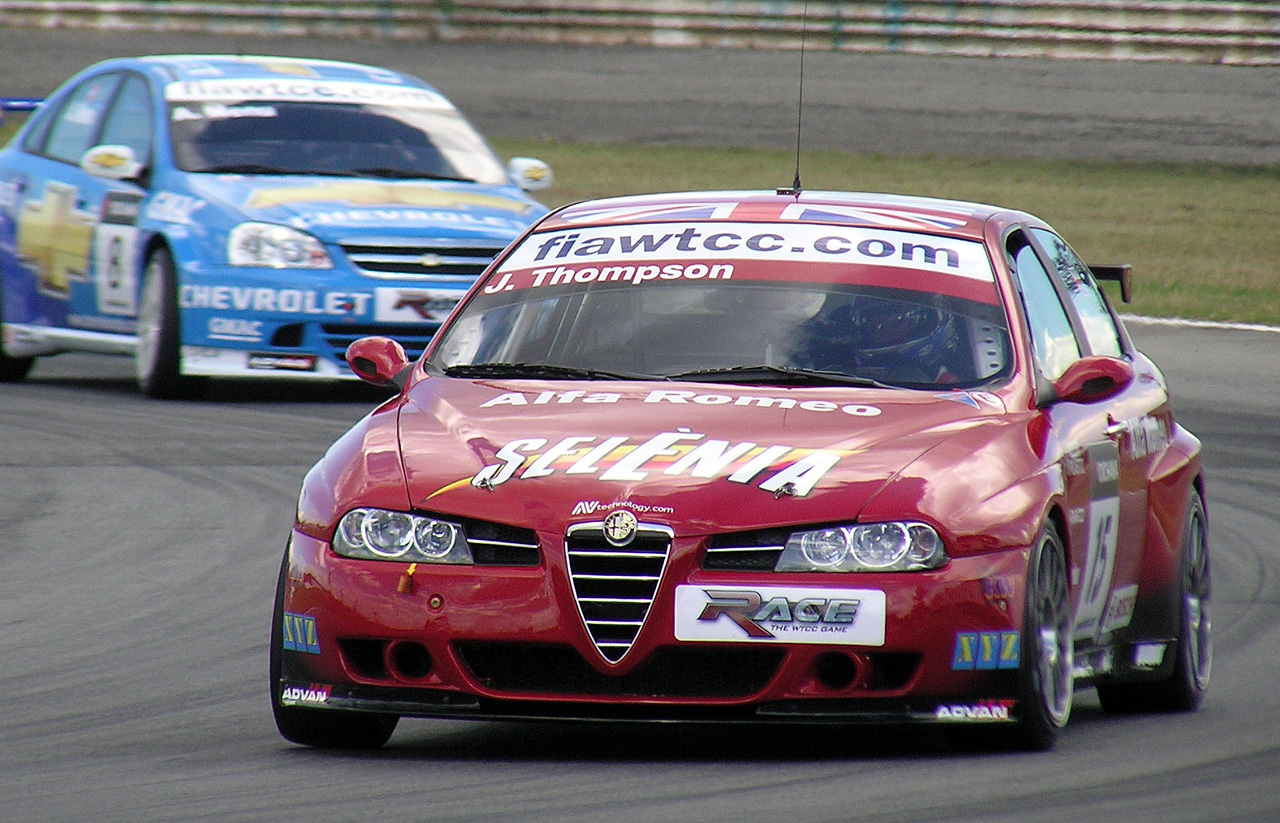
James Thompson driving an N.Technology Alfa Romeo 156 in the WTCC at Curitiba in 2007.

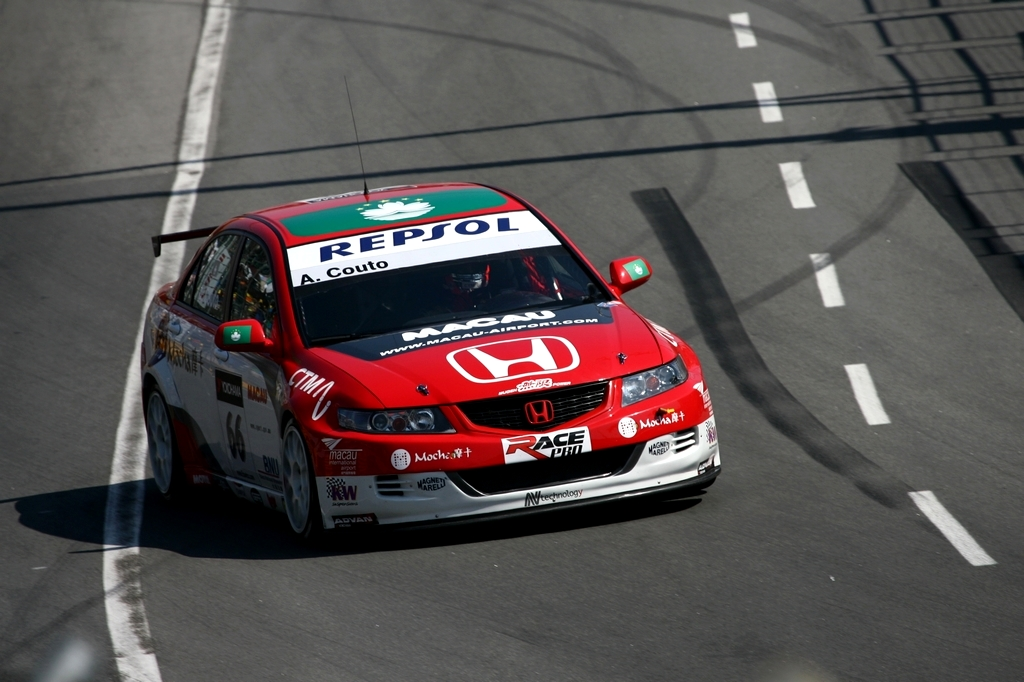
André Couto driving a Honda Accord Euro R for N.Technology at the 2008 Guia Race, the last WTCC race for the team.

=== Rallying ===
N.Technology ran Fiat's entry in the inaugural season of the Intercontinental Rally Challenge, with driver Giandomenico Basso winning the championship with a Fiat Punto Abarth S2000 in 2006.

=== Formula Master ===
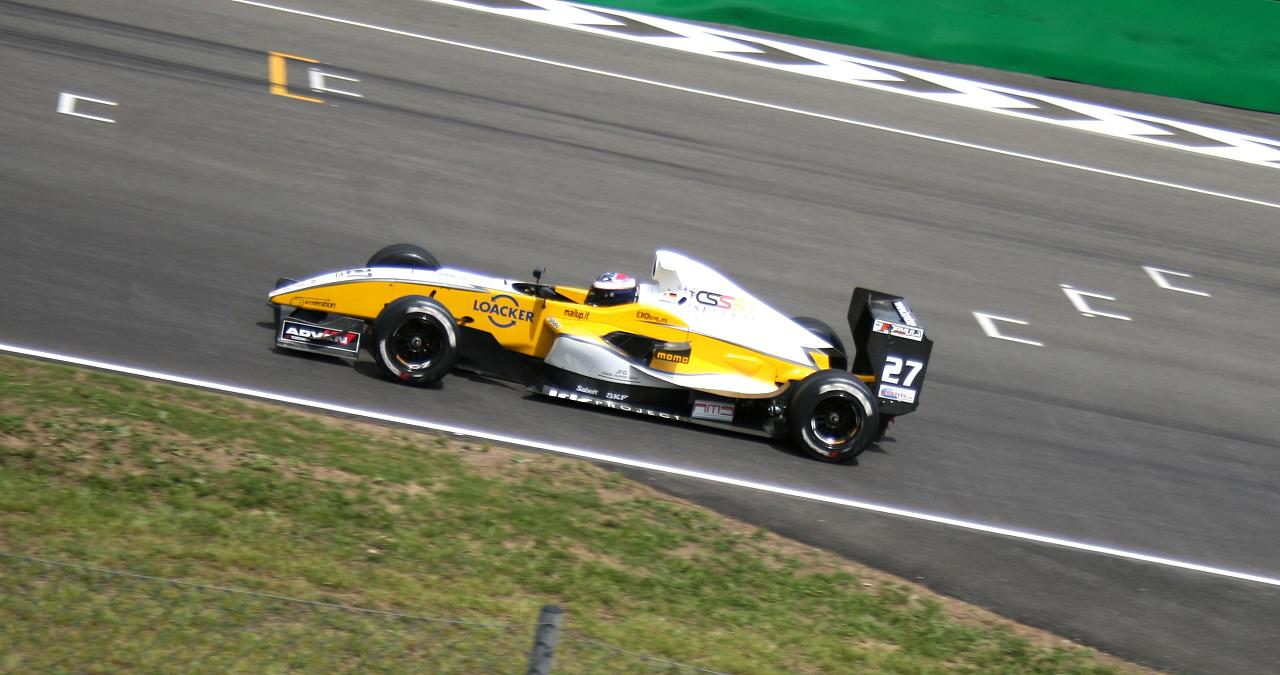
An International Formula Master car.

N.Technology created the International Formula Master series, which began in 2007.

=== Superstars ===
In 2010, N. Technology built and ran a Porsche Panamera for touring car specialist, Fabrizio Giovanardi.

=== Formula One application ===
In 2009, N.Technology's parent company, MSC Organization Ltd, submitted an application under the N.Technology banner to join the 2010 Formula One World Championship. The team stated that it had deals in place with potential partners should its application be successful.

The list of entrants for the 2010 Formula One World Championship season did not include N.Technology when it was posted on 12 June. On 19 June it was revealed that N.Technology had withdrawn its application to enter F1 because it did not want to be involved without major manufacturers, following FOTA's proposals to form a breakaway series.
