= 1995 Campeonato de España de Turismos =

Seasons
- ← 1994 1996 →

The 1995 Campeonato de España de Turismos was won by Luis Villamil with Alfa Romeo 155 TS.

== Teams and drivers ==
Team	Car	No.	Drivers	Rounds	Class
(Italy) Alfa Corse	Alfa Romeo 155 TS	1	(Spain) Adrian Campos	All	
(Spain) Teo Martin Motorsport	BMW 318iS	2	(Spain) Antonio Albacete	1-3, 5-10	P
(Italy) Alfa Corse	Alfa Romeo 155 TS	3	(Spain) Luis Villamil	All	
(Italy) Alfa Corse	Alfa Romeo 155 TS	4	(Italy) Giorgio Francia	All	
(Spain) Opel Team Espaňa	Opel Vectra GT	5	(Spain) Jordi Gene	All	
(Spain) Opel Team Espaňa	Opel Vectra GT	6	(Italy) Alex Caffi	All	
(Spain) Ford Espaňa	Ford Mondeo Ghia	7	(Spain) Jesús Pareja	1-5	
(Spain) Ford Espaňa	Ford Mondeo Ghia	8	(Spain) Carlos Palau	1, 3-5	
(Spain) Ford Espaňa	Ford Mondeo Ghia 4x4	8	(Spain) Carlos Palau	2	
(Spain) Pedro Paz	BMW 318iS	9	(Spain) Alex Villanueva	1, 10	P
(Spain) Pedro Paz	BMW 318iS	9	(Italy) Luigi Mazzali	2-5	P
(Spain) Meycom	SEAT Toledo GT	10	(Spain) Rafael Barrios	1-3	P
(Spain) Meycom	SEAT Toledo GT	11	(Spain) Ricardo Garcia Galiano	1-3	P
(Spain) Jesus Diez Villarroel	BMW 318iS	12	(Spain) Jesus Diez Villarroel	1-5	P
(Spain) Equip Vinyes Dabad	Nissan Primera eGT	13	(Andorra) Joan Vinyes	All	P
(Spain) José Ruiz Thiery	Alfa Romeo 155 TS	14	(Spain) Iñaki Goiburu	2-3, 5-10	P
(Spain) Elide Racing	Alfa Romeo 155 TS	15	(Spain) Miguel Angel de Castro	3-6	P
(Spain) Team Repsol Nissan	Nissan Primera eGT	23	(Spain) Luis Pérez-Sala	1-2, 4-10	
(Spain) Team Repsol Nissan	Nissan Primera eGT 4x4	23	(Spain) Luis Pérez-Sala	3	
(Spain) Team Repsol Nissan	Nissan Primera eGT	33	(Belgium) Eric van de Poele	1-9	
Guest drivers ineligible to score points
(Spain) David Bosch	Opel Vectra GT	100	(Spain) David Bosch	1	
(Italy) Alfa Corse	Alfa Romeo 155 TS	101	(Italy) Gianni Giudici	7	
(Italy) Alfa Corse	Alfa Romeo 155 TS	101	(Italy) Giampiero Simoni	8-9	
(Spain) Opel Team Espaňa	Opel Vectra GT	102	(Scotland) Anthony Reid	8-9	
(Italy) Tecnica Racing Team	Alfa Romeo 155 TS	102	(Italy) Felice Tedeschi	10	
(Spain) Escuderia Costa Brava	BMW 318iS	103	(Spain) Xavier Riera	9-10	
(Spain) Team Repsol Nissan	Nissan Primera eGT	123	(Italy) Ivan Capelli	9-10	

Icon	Class
P	Private Drivers

== Race calendar and results ==
Round		Circuit	Date	Pole position	Fastest lap	Winning driver	Winning team
1	R1	(Spain) Circuito de Jerez	2 April	(Belgium) Eric van de Poele	(Italy) Giorgio Francia	(Spain) Antonio Albacete	(Spain) Teo Martin Motorsport
1	R2	(Spain) Circuito de Jerez	2 April		(Spain) Antonio Albacete	(Spain) Antonio Albacete	(Spain) Teo Martin Motorsport
2	R1	(Spain) Circuito del Jarama	23 April	(Belgium) Eric van de Poele	(Italy) Giorgio Francia	(Italy) Giorgio Francia	(Italy) Alfa Corse
2	R2	(Spain) Circuito del Jarama	23 April		(Spain) Antonio Albacete	(Spain) Luis Villamil	(Italy) Alfa Corse
3	R1	(Spain) Circuit de Barcelona-Catalunya	28 May	(Italy) Alex Caffi	(Belgium) Eric van de Poele	(Italy) Alex Caffi	(Spain) Opel Team Espaňa
3	R2	(Spain) Circuit de Barcelona-Catalunya	28 May		(Spain) Jordi Gene	(Belgium) Eric van de Poele	(Spain) Team Repsol Nissan
4	R1	(Portugal) Circuito do Estoril	25 June	(Italy) Giorgio Francia	(Belgium) Eric van de Poele	(Italy) Giorgio Francia	(Italy) Alfa Corse
4	R2	(Portugal) Circuito do Estoril	25 June		(Spain) Luis Villamil	(Spain) Luis Villamil	(Italy) Alfa Corse
5	R1	(Spain) Circuito de Albacete	2 July	(Spain) Jordi Gene	(Spain) Antonio Albacete	(Spain) Luis Pérez-Sala	(Spain) Team Repsol Nissan
5	R2	(Spain) Circuito de Albacete	2 July		(Spain) Jordi Gene	(Spain) Jordi Gene	(Spain) Opel Team Espaňa
6	R1	(Spain) Circuit de Calafat	10 September	(Spain) Luis Pérez-Sala	(Andorra) Joan Vinyes	(Belgium) Eric van de Poele	(Spain) Team Repsol Nissan
6	R2	(Spain) Circuit de Calafat	10 September		(Spain) Antonio Albacete	(Spain) Luis Pérez-Sala	(Spain) Team Repsol Nissan
7	R1	(Spain) Circuito de Albacete	1 October	(Spain) Jordi Gene	(Spain) Adrian Campos	(Spain) Adrian Campos	(Italy) Alfa Corse
7	R2	(Spain) Circuito de Albacete	1 October		(Belgium) Eric van de Poele	(Spain) Adrian Campos	(Italy) Alfa Corse
8	R1	(Spain) Circuito de Jerez	29 October	(Spain) Luis Pérez-Sala	(Italy) Alex Caffi	(Spain) Luis Villamil	(Italy) Alfa Corse
8	R2	(Spain) Circuito de Jerez	29 October		(Italy) Alex Caffi	(Spain) Antonio Albacete	(Spain) Teo Martin Motorsport
9	R1	(Spain) Circuit de Barcelona-Catalunya	12 November	(Belgium) Eric van de Poele	(Belgium) Eric van de Poele	(Belgium) Eric van de Poele	(Spain) Team Repsol Nissan
9	R2	(Spain) Circuit de Barcelona-Catalunya	12 November		(Spain) Jordi Gene	(Belgium) Eric van de Poele	(Spain) Team Repsol Nissan
10	R1	(Spain) Circuito del Jarama	26 November	(Spain) Antonio Albacete	(Spain) Antonio Albacete	(Spain) Antonio Albacete	(Spain) Teo Martin Motorsport
10	R2	(Spain) Circuito del Jarama	26 November		(Spain) Antonio Albacete	(Spain) Antonio Albacete	(Spain) Teo Martin Motorsport

== Round 1 (Spain) Circuito de Jerez ==
Qualifying

Pos	No	Driver	Car	Lap Time	Super Pole
1	33	(Belgium) Eric van de Poele	Nissan Primera eGT	1.49.91	SP
2	5	(Spain) Jordi Gene	Opel Vectra GT	1.50.17	SP
3	6	(Italy) Alex Caffi	Opel Vectra GT	1.50.40	SP
4	4	(Italy) Giorgio Francia	Alfa Romeo 155	1.50.69	SP
5	23	(Spain) Luis Pérez-Sala	Nissan Primera eGT	1.50.76	SP
6	2	(Spain) Antonio Albacete	BMW 318iS	1.51.42	SP
7	1	(Spain) Adrian Campos	Alfa Romeo 155	1.50.77	
8	3	(Spain) Luis Villamil	Alfa Romeo 155	1.50.80	
9	12	(Spain) Jesus Diez Villarroel	BMW 318iS	1.52.00	
10	8	(Spain) Carlos Palau	Ford Mondeo Ghia	1.52.14	
11	13	(Andorra) Joan Vinyes	Nissan Primera eGT	1.52.96	
12	100	(Spain) David Bosch	Opel Vectra GT	1.53.50	
13	11	(Spain) Ricardo Garcia Galiano	SEAT Toledo GT	1.55.15	
14	9	(Spain) Alex Villanueva	BMW 318iS	1.55.27	
15	7	(Spain) Jesús Pareja	Ford Mondeo Ghia	no time	
16	10	(Spain) Rafael Barrios	SEAT Toledo GT	no time	

Race 1

Pos	No	Driver	Constructor	Time/Retired	Points
1	2	(Spain) Antonio Albacete	BMW 318iS	10 laps in 18:39.12	20
2	5	(Spain) Jordi Gene	Opel Vectra GT	+5.31s	15
3	33	(Belgium) Eric van de Poele	Nissan Primera eGT	+0.74s	12
4	3	(Spain) Luis Villamil	Alfa Romeo 155	+11.66s	10
5	6	(Italy) Alex Caffi	Opel Vectra GT	+11.94s	8
6	1	(Spain) Adrian Campos	Alfa Romeo 155	+14.31s	6
7	23	(Spain) Luis Pérez-Sala	Nissan Primera eGT	+16.65s	4
8	8	(Spain) Carlos Palau	Ford Mondeo Ghia	+17.27s	3
9	7	(Spain) Jesús Pareja	Ford Mondeo Ghia	+19.53s	2
10	11	(Spain) Ricardo Garcia Galiano	SEAT Toledo GT	+37.75s	1
11	12	(Spain) Jesus Diez Villarroel	BMW 318iS	+39.08s	
12	4	(Italy) Giorgio Francia	Alfa Romeo 155	+39.89s	
13	9	(Spain) Alex Villanueva	BMW 318iS	+52.66s	
DNF	100	(Spain) David Bosch	Opel Vectra GT	+6 laps	
DNF	10	(Spain) Rafael Barrios	SEAT Toledo GT	+10 laps	
DNS	13	(Andorra) Joan Vinyes	Nissan Primera eGT		

Race 2

Pos	No	Driver	Constructor	Time/Retired	Points
1	2	(Spain) Antonio Albacete	BMW 318iS	10 laps in 18:47.88	20
2	3	(Spain) Luis Villamil	Alfa Romeo 155	+0.52s	15
3	1	(Spain) Adrian Campos	Alfa Romeo 155	+4.21s	12
4	4	(Italy) Giorgio Francia	Alfa Romeo 155	+4.60s	10
5	23	(Spain) Luis Pérez-Sala	Nissan Primera eGT	+8.28s	8
6	5	(Spain) Jordi Gene	Opel Vectra GT	+9.24s	6
7	12	(Spain) Jesus Diez Villarroel	BMW 318iS	+14.77s	4
8	7	(Spain) Jesús Pareja	Ford Mondeo Ghia	+16.13s	3
9	8	(Spain) Carlos Palau	Ford Mondeo Ghia	+17.96s	2
10	9	(Spain) Alex Villanueva	BMW 318iS	+39.28s	1
DNF	33	(Belgium) Eric van de Poele	Nissan Primera eGT	+3 laps	
DNF	6	(Italy) Alex Caffi	Opel Vectra GT	+6 laps	
DNS	11	(Spain) Ricardo Garcia Galiano	SEAT Toledo GT		
DNS	100	(Spain) David Bosch	Opel Vectra GT		
DNS	10	(Spain) Rafael Barrios	SEAT Toledo GT		
DNS	13	(Andorra) Joan Vinyes	Nissan Primera eGT		

=== Championship standings after Round 1 ===
Drivers' Championship standings

Pos	Driver	Points
1	(Spain) Antonio Albacete	40
2	(Spain) Luis Villamil	25
3	(Spain) Jordi Gene	21
4	(Spain) Adrian Campos	18
5	(Belgium) Eric van de Poele	12

Constructors' Championship standings

Pos	Constructor	Points
1	(Italy) Alfa Romeo	34
2	(Germany) Opel	24
3	(Japan) Nissan	22
4	(United States) Ford	11

== Round 2 (Spain) Circuito del Jarama ==
Qualifying

Pos	No	Driver	Car	Lap Time	Super Pole
1	33	(Belgium) Eric van de Poele	Nissan Primera eGT	1.39.688	SP
2	4	(Italy) Giorgio Francia	Alfa Romeo 155	1.39.736	SP
3	6	(Italy) Alex Caffi	Opel Vectra GT	1.39.859	SP
4	5	(Spain) Jordi Gene	Opel Vectra GT	1.40.465	SP
5	23	(Spain) Luis Pérez-Sala	Nissan Primera eGT	1.40.904	SP
6	2	(Spain) Antonio Albacete	BMW 318iS	1.41.017	SP
7	7	(Spain) Jesús Pareja	Ford Mondeo Ghia	1.40.994	
8	3	(Spain) Luis Villamil	Alfa Romeo 155	1.41.330	
9	1	(Spain) Adrian Campos	Alfa Romeo 155	1.41.554	
10	8	(Spain) Carlos Palau	Ford Mondeo Ghia	1.41.631	
11	13	(Andorra) Joan Vinyes	Nissan Primera eGT	1.41.699	
12	14	(Spain) Iñaki Goiburu	Alfa Romeo 155	1.42.080	
13	9	(Italy) Luigi Mazzali	BMW 318iS	1.42.841	
14	11	(Spain) Ricardo Garcia Galiano	SEAT Toledo GT	1.42.860	
15	12	(Spain) Jesus Diez Villarroel	BMW 318iS	1.42.987	
16	10	(Spain) Rafael Barrios	SEAT Toledo GT	1.44.045	

Race 1

Pos	No	Driver	Constructor	Time/Retired	Points
1	4	(Italy) Giorgio Francia	Alfa Romeo 155	11 laps in 18:39.065	20
2	33	(Belgium) Eric van de Poele	Nissan Primera eGT	+4.371s	15
3	3	(Spain) Luis Villamil	Alfa Romeo 155	+9.158s	12
4	23	(Spain) Luis Pérez-Sala	Nissan Primera eGT	+10.387s	10
5	1	(Spain) Adrian Campos	Alfa Romeo 155	+11.386s	8
6	14	(Spain) Iñaki Goiburu	Alfa Romeo 155	+11.726s	6
DSQ	2	(Spain) Antonio Albacete*	BMW 318iS	+15.046	
7	6	(Italy) Alex Caffi	Opel Vectra GT	+18.864s	4
8	12	(Spain) Jesus Diez Villarroel	BMW 318iS	+20.554s	3
9	8	(Spain) Carlos Palau	Ford Mondeo Ghia	+21.701s	2
10	11	(Spain) Ricardo Garcia Galiano	SEAT Toledo GT	+30.585s	1
11	9	(Italy) Luigi Mazzali	BMW 318iS	+34.938s	
12	5	(Spain) Jordi Gene**	Opel Vectra GT	+38.585s	
DNF	7	(Spain) Jesús Pareja	Ford Mondeo Ghia	+5 laps	
DNF	10	(Spain) Rafael Barrios	SEAT Toledo GT	+8 laps	
DNF	13	(Andorra) Joan Vinyes	Nissan Primera eGT	+8 laps	

- Albacete excluded for incident with Gene
  - Gene penalized 30 seconds for incident with Albacete

Race 2

Pos	No	Driver	Constructor	Time/Retired	Points
1	3	(Spain) Luis Villamil	Alfa Romeo 155	11 laps in 18:43.279s	20
2	4	(Italy) Giorgio Francia	Alfa Romeo 155	+0.442s	15
3	2	(Spain) Antonio Albacete	BMW 318iS	+0.563s	12
4	1	(Spain) Adrian Campos	Alfa Romeo 155	+3.057s	10
5	6	(Italy) Alex Caffi	Opel Vectra GT	+8.087s	8
6	14	(Spain) Iñaki Goiburu	Alfa Romeo 155	+9.224s	6
7	5	(Spain) Jordi Gene	Opel Vectra GT	+9.475s	4
8	33	(Belgium) Eric van de Poele	Nissan Primera eGT	+11.210s	3
9	23	(Spain) Luis Pérez-Sala	Nissan Primera eGT	+12.483s	2
10	7	(Spain) Jesús Pareja	Ford Mondeo Ghia	+15.504s	1
11	12	(Spain) Jesus Diez Villarroel	BMW 318iS	+22.775s	
12	11	(Spain) Ricardo Garcia Galiano	SEAT Toledo GT	+27.554s	
13	9	(Italy) Luigi Mazzali	BMW 318iS	+36.724s	
14	10	(Spain) Rafael Barrios	SEAT Toledo GT	+40.011s	
DNF	8	(Spain) Carlos Palau	Ford Mondeo Ghia	+8 laps	
DNS	13	(Andorra) Joan Vinyes	Nissan Primera eGT		

=== Championship standings after Round 2 ===
Drivers' Championship standings

Pos	Driver	Points
1	(Spain) Luis Villamil	57
2	(Spain) Antonio Albacete	52
3	(Italy) Giorgio Francia	45
4	(Spain) Adrian Campos	36
5	(Belgium) Eric van de Poele	30

Constructors' Championship standings

Pos	Constructor	Points
1	(Italy) Alfa Romeo	76
2	(Japan) Nissan	47
3	(Germany) Opel	45
4	(United States) Ford	15

== Round 3 (Spain) Circuit de Barcelona-Catalunya ==
Qualifying

Pos	No	Driver	Car	Lap Time	Super Pole
1	6	(Italy) Alex Caffi	Opel Vectra GT	1.14.327	SP
2	5	(Spain) Jordi Gene	Opel Vectra GT	1.14.455	SP
3	33	(Belgium) Eric van de Poele	Nissan Primera eGT	time disallowed	SP
4	4	(Italy) Giorgio Francia	Alfa Romeo 155	time disallowed	SP
5	1	(Spain) Adrian Campos	Alfa Romeo 155	time disallowed	SP
6	3	(Spain) Luis Villamil	Alfa Romeo 155	time disallowed	SP
7	2	(Spain) Antonio Albacete	BMW 318iS	1.14.785	
8	7	(Spain) Jesús Pareja	Ford Mondeo Ghia	1.14.844	
9	15	(Spain) Miguel Angel de Castro	Alfa Romeo 155	1.14.848	
10	13	(Andorra) Joan Vinyes	Nissan Primera eGT	1.15.189	
11	11	(Spain) Ricardo Garcia Galiano	SEAT Toledo GT	1.15.317	
12	12	(Spain) Jesus Diez Villarroel	BMW 318iS	1.15.503	
13	8	(Spain) Carlos Palau	Ford Mondeo Ghia	1.16.149	
14	14	(Spain) Iñaki Goiburu	Alfa Romeo 155	1.16.807	
15	10	(Spain) Rafael Barrios	SEAT Toledo GT	1.16.897	
16	9	(Italy) Luigi Mazzali	BMW 318iS	1.17.376	
17	23	(Spain) Luis Pérez-Sala	Nissan Primera 4x4	1.34.273	

Race 1

Pos	No	Driver	Constructor	Time/Retired	Points
1	6	(Italy) Alex Caffi	Opel Vectra GT	14 laps in 17:35.589	20
2	33	(Belgium) Eric van de Poele	Nissan Primera eGT	+0.711s	15
3	5	(Spain) Jordi Gene	Opel Vectra GT	+1.243s	12
4	1	(Spain) Adrian Campos	Alfa Romeo 155	+5.842s	10
5	2	(Spain) Antonio Albacete	BMW 318iS	+8.357s	8
6	4	(Italy) Giorgio Francia	Alfa Romeo 155	+10.898s	6
7	13	(Andorra) Joan Vinyes	Nissan Primera eGT	+19.692s	4
8	12	(Spain) Jesus Diez Villarroel	BMW 318iS	+22.633s	3
9	15	(Spain) Miguel Angel de Castro	Alfa Romeo 155	+36.191s	2
10	11	(Spain) Ricardo Garcia Galiano	SEAT Toledo GT	+36.339s	1
11	10	(Spain) Rafael Barrios	SEAT Toledo GT	+45.500s	
12	3	(Spain) Luis Villamil	Alfa Romeo 155	+1 lap	
DNF	9	(Italy) Luigi Mazzali	BMW 318iS	+1 lap	
DNF	8	(Spain) Carlos Palau	Ford Mondeo Ghia	+1 lap	
DNF	7	(Spain) Jesús Pareja	Ford Mondeo Ghia	+14 laps	
DNF	14	(Spain) Iñaki Goiburu	Alfa Romeo 155	+14 laps	
DNS	23	(Spain) Luis Pérez-Sala	Nissan Primera 4x4		

Race 2

Pos	No	Driver	Constructor	Time/Retired	Points
1	33	(Belgium) Eric van de Poele	Nissan Primera eGT	14 laps in 17:36.492	20
2	5	(Spain) Jordi Gene	Opel Vectra GT	+1.777s	15
3	6	(Italy) Alex Caffi	Opel Vectra GT	+3.424s	12
4	2	(Spain) Antonio Albacete	BMW 318iS	+11.215s	10
5	12	(Spain) Jesus Diez Villarroel	BMW 318iS	+18.919s	8
6	13	(Andorra) Joan Vinyes	Nissan Primera eGT	+25.673s	6
7	3	(Spain) Luis Villamil	Alfa Romeo 155	+27.309s	4
8	1	(Spain) Adrian Campos	Alfa Romeo 155	+27.791s	3
9	11	(Spain) Ricardo Garcia Galiano	SEAT Toledo GT	+47.921s	2
10	10	(Spain) Rafael Barrios	SEAT Toledo GT	+1 lap	1
DNF	4	(Italy) Giorgio Francia	Alfa Romeo 155	+14 laps	
DNF	15	(Spain) Miguel Angel de Castro	Alfa Romeo 155	+14 laps	
DNS	14	(Spain) Iñaki Goiburu	Alfa Romeo 155		
DNS	7	(Spain) Jesús Pareja	Ford Mondeo Ghia		
DNS	9	(Italy) Luigi Mazzali	BMW 318iS		
DNS	8	(Spain) Carlos Palau	Ford Mondeo Ghia		
DNS	23	(Spain) Luis Pérez-Sala	Nissan Primera 4x4		

=== Championship standings after Round 3 ===
Drivers' Championship standings

Pos	Driver	Points
1	(Spain) Antonio Albacete	70
2	(Belgium) Eric van de Poele	65
3	(Italy) Alex Caffi	62
4	(Spain) Luis Villamil	61
5	(Spain) Jordi Gene	52

Constructors' Championship standings

Pos	Constructor	Points
1	(Italy) Alfa Romeo	101
2	(Germany) Opel	83
3	(Japan) Nissan	69
4	(United States) Ford	15

== Round 4 (Portugal) Circuito do Estoril ==
Qualifying

Pos	No	Driver	Car	Lap Time	Super Pole
1	4	(Italy) Giorgio Francia	Alfa Romeo 155	1.51.261	SP
2	6	(Italy) Alex Caffi	Opel Vectra GT	1.51.571	SP
3	23	(Spain) Luis Pérez-Sala	Nissan Primera eGT	1.52.190	SP
4	1	(Spain) Adrian Campos	Alfa Romeo 155	1.52.266	SP
5	33	(Belgium) Eric van de Poele	Nissan Primera eGT	1.52.331	SP
6	5	(Spain) Jordi Gene	Opel Vectra GT	no time	SP
7	13	(Andorra) Joan Vinyes	Nissan Primera eGT	1.52.000	
8	15	(Spain) Miguel Angel de Castro	Alfa Romeo 155	1.52.003	
9	12	(Spain) Jesus Diez Villarroel	BMW 318iS	1.52.254	
10	7	(Spain) Jesús Pareja	Ford Mondeo Ghia	1.53.396	
11	8	(Spain) Carlos Palau	Ford Mondeo Ghia	1.53.404	
12	9	(Italy) Luigi Mazzali	BMW 318iS	2.00.510	
13	3	(Spain) Luis Villamil	Alfa Romeo 155	no time	

Race 1

Pos	No	Driver	Constructor	Time/Retired	Points
1	4	(Italy) Giorgio Francia	Alfa Romeo 155	10 laps in 18:56.906	20
2	3	(Spain) Luis Villamil	Alfa Romeo 155	+1.684s	15
3	5	(Spain) Jordi Gene	Opel Vectra GT	+3.176s	12
4	33	(Belgium) Eric van de Poele	Nissan Primera eGT	+3.304s	10
5	13	(Andorra) Joan Vinyes	Nissan Primera eGT	+15.590s	8
6	12	(Spain) Jesus Diez Villarroel	BMW 318iS	+17.058s	6
7	8	(Spain) Carlos Palau	Ford Mondeo Ghia	+26.844s	4
8	23	(Spain) Luis Pérez-Sala	Nissan Primera eGT	+29.595s	3
9	15	(Spain) Miguel Angel de Castro	Alfa Romeo 155	+31.032s	2
10	6	(Italy) Alex Caffi	Opel Vectra GT	+39.016s	1
11	1	(Spain) Adrian Campos	Alfa Romeo 155	+45.569s	
12	9	(Italy) Luigi Mazzali	BMW 318iS	+1.33.565s	
DNF	7	(Spain) Jesús Pareja	Ford Mondeo Ghia	+10 laps	

Race 2

Pos	No	Driver	Constructor	Time/Retired	Points
1	3	(Spain) Luis Villamil	Alfa Romeo 155	10 laps in 18:56.363	20
2	33	(Belgium) Eric van de Poele	Nissan Primera eGT	+1.213s	15
3	5	(Spain) Jordi Gene	Opel Vectra GT	+1.721s	12
4	1	(Spain) Adrian Campos	Alfa Romeo 155	+9.245s	10
5	13	(Andorra) Joan Vinyes	Nissan Primera eGT	+18.246s	8
6	23	(Spain) Luis Pérez-Sala	Nissan Primera eGT	+19.169s	6
7	8	(Spain) Carlos Palau	Ford Mondeo Ghia	+27.378s	4
8	7	(Spain) Jesús Pareja	Ford Mondeo Ghia	+34.904s	3
DNF	9	(Italy) Luigi Mazzali	BMW 318iS	+5 laps	
DNF	4	(Italy) Giorgio Francia	Alfa Romeo 155	+6 laps	
DNF	6	(Italy) Alex Caffi	Opel Vectra GT	+10 laps	
DNF	12	(Spain) Jesus Diez Villarroel	BMW 318iS	+10 laps	
DNS	15	(Spain) Miguel Angel de Castro	Alfa Romeo 155		

=== Championship standings after Round 4 ===
Drivers' Championship standings

Pos	Driver	Points
1	(Spain) Luis Villamil	96
2	(Belgium) Eric van de Poele	90
3	(Spain) Jordi Gene	76
4	(Italy) Giorgio Francia	71
5	(Spain) Antonio Albacete	70

Constructors' Championship standings

Pos	Constructor	Points
1	(Italy) Alfa Romeo	142
2	(Germany) Opel	102
3	(Japan) Nissan	98
4	(United States) Ford	28

== Round 5 (Spain) Circuito de Albacete ==
Qualifying

Pos	No	Driver	Car	Lap Time	Super Pole
1	5	(Spain) Jordi Gene	Opel Vectra GT	1.38.063	SP
2	23	(Spain) Luis Pérez-Sala	Nissan Primera eGT	1.38.383	SP
3	3	(Spain) Luis Villamil	Alfa Romeo 155	1.38.791	SP
4	4	(Italy) Giorgio Francia	Alfa Romeo 155	1.38.845	SP
5	1	(Spain) Adrian Campos	Alfa Romeo 155	1.38.873	SP
6	2	(Spain) Antonio Albacete	BMW 318iS	1.40.006	SP
7	33	(Belgium) Eric van de Poele	Nissan Primera eGT	1.37.991	
8	13	(Andorra) Joan Vinyes	Nissan Primera eGT	1.38.224	
9	6	(Italy) Alex Caffi	Opel Vectra GT	1.38.605	
10	14	(Spain) Iñaki Goiboru	Alfa Romeo 155	1.39.062	
11	7	(Spain) Jesús Pareja	Ford Mondeo Ghia	1.39.157	
12	15	(Spain) Miguel Angel de Castro	Alfa Romeo 155	1.39.561	
13	8	(Spain) Carlos Palau	Ford Mondeo Ghia	1.40.052	
14	12	(Spain) Jesus Diez Villarroel	BMW 318iS	1.40.176	
15	9	(Italy) Luigi Mazzali	BMW 318iS	1.44.236	

Race 1

Pos	No	Driver	Constructor	Time/Retired	Points
1	23	(Spain) Luis Pérez-Sala	Nissan Primera eGT	12 laps in 20:02.371	20
2	5	(Spain) Jordi Gene	Opel Vectra GT	+0.430s	15
3	6	(Italy) Alex Caffi	Opel Vectra GT	+5.431s	12
4	4	(Italy) Giorgio Francia	Alfa Romeo 155	+6.308s	10
5	1	(Spain) Adrian Campos	Alfa Romeo 155	+8.148s	8
6	13	(Andorra) Joan Vinyes	Nissan Primera eGT	+14.280s	6
7	14	(Spain) Iñaki Goiboru	Alfa Romeo 155	+17.339s	4
8	3	(Spain) Luis Villamil	Alfa Romeo 155	+19.887s	3
9	15	(Spain) Miguel Angel de Castro	Alfa Romeo 155	+25.727s	2
10	12	(Spain) Jesus Diez Villarroel	BMW 318iS	+26.238s	1
11	7	(Spain) Jesús Pareja	Ford Mondeo Ghia	+26.885s	
12	8	(Spain) Carlos Palau	Ford Mondeo Ghia	+27.125s	
DNF	2	(Spain) Antonio Albacete	BMW 318iS	+3 laps	
DNF	33	(Belgium) Eric van de Poele	Nissan Primera eGT	+11 laps	
DNF	9	(Italy) Luigi Mazzali	BMW 318iS	+11 laps	

Race 2

Pos	No	Driver	Constructor	Time/Retired	Points
1	5	(Spain) Jordi Gene	Opel Vectra GT	12 laps in 20:10.589	20
2	3	(Spain) Luis Villamil	Alfa Romeo 155	+4.733s	15
3	4	(Italy) Giorgio Francia	Alfa Romeo 155	+7.094s	12
4	1	(Spain) Adrian Campos	Alfa Romeo 155	+8.117s	10
5	33	(Belgium) Eric van de Poele	Nissan Primera eGT	+8.288s	8
6	13	(Andorra) Joan Vinyes	Nissan Primera eGT	+24.338s	6
7	12	(Spain) Jesus Diez Villarroel	BMW 318iS	+30.531s	4
8	7	(Spain) Jesús Pareja	Ford Mondeo Ghia	+30.743s	3
9	15	(Spain) Miguel Angel de Castro	Alfa Romeo 155	+32.180s	2
10	9	(Italy) Luigi Mazzali	BMW 318iS	+41.250s	1
DNF	6	(Italy) Alex Caffi	Opel Vectra GT	+4 laps	
DNF	14	(Spain) Iñaki Goiboru	Alfa Romeo 155	+8 laps	
DNF	23	(Spain) Luis Pérez-Sala	Nissan Primera eGT	+9 laps	
DNF	2	(Spain) Antonio Albacete	BMW 318iS	+9 laps	
DNF	8	(Spain) Carlos Palau	Ford Mondeo Ghia	+9 laps	

=== Championship standings after Round 5 ===
Drivers' Championship standings

Pos	Driver	Points
1	(Spain) Luis Villamil	114
2	(Spain) Jordi Gene	111
3	(Belgium) Eric van de Poele	98
4	(Italy) Giorgio Francia	93
5	(Spain) Adrian Campos	77

Constructors' Championship standings

Pos	Constructor	Points
1	(Italy) Alfa Romeo	173
2	(Germany) Opel	132
3	(Japan) Nissan	126
4	(United States) Ford	38

== Round 6 (Spain) Circuit de Calafat ==
Qualifying

Pos	No	Driver	Car	Lap Time	Super Pole
1	23	(Spain) Luis Pérez-Sala	Nissan Primera eGT	1.31.94	SP
2	5	(Spain) Jordi Gene	Opel Vectra GT	1.32.20	SP
3	33	(Belgium) Eric van de Poele	Nissan Primera eGT	1.32.59	SP
4	6	(Italy) Alex Caffi	Opel Vectra GT	1.32.60	SP
5	13	(Andorra) Joan Vinyes	Nissan Primera eGT	1.33.09	SP
6	6	(Spain) Antonio Albacete	BMW 318iS	1.34.44	SP
7	1	(Spain) Adrian Campos	Alfa Romeo 155	time disallowed	
8	3	(Spain) Luis Villamil	Alfa Romeo 155	time disallowed	
9	4	(Italy) Giorgio Francia	Alfa Romeo 155	time disallowed	
10	14	(Spain) Iñaki Goiboru	Alfa Romeo 155	time disallowed	
11	15	(Spain) Miguel Angel de Castro	Alfa Romeo 155	time disallowed	

Race 1

Pos	No	Driver	Constructor	Time/Retired	Points
1	33	(Belgium) Eric van de Poele	Nissan Primera eGT	13 laps in 20:23.38	20
2	23	(Spain) Luis Pérez-Sala	Nissan Primera eGT	+0.78s	15
3	5	(Spain) Jordi Gene	Opel Vectra GT	+1.47s	12
4	6	(Spain) Antonio Albacete	BMW 318iS	+4.39s	10
5	13	(Andorra) Joan Vinyes	Nissan Primera eGT	+7.75s	8
6	3	(Spain) Luis Villamil	Alfa Romeo 155	+10.99s	6
7	1	(Spain) Adrian Campos	Alfa Romeo 155	+12.71s	4
8	4	(Italy) Giorgio Francia	Alfa Romeo 155	+18.86s	3
9	15	(Spain) Miguel Angel de Castro	Alfa Romeo 155	+21.83s	2
10	14	(Spain) Iñaki Goiboru	Alfa Romeo 155	+43.10s	1
DNF	6	(Italy) Alex Caffi	Opel Vectra GT	6 laps	

Race 2

Pos	No	Driver	Constructor	Time/Retired	Points
1	23	(Spain) Luis Pérez-Sala	Nissan Primera eGT	13 laps in 20:36.23	20
2	6	(Spain) Antonio Albacete	BMW 318iS	+0.39s	15
3	5	(Spain) Jordi Gene	Opel Vectra GT	+3.98s	12
4	33	(Belgium) Eric van de Poele	Nissan Primera eGT	+7.12s	10
5	3	(Spain) Luis Villamil	Alfa Romeo 155	+7.79s	8
6	13	(Andorra) Joan Vinyes	Nissan Primera eGT	+12.00s	6
7	4	(Italy) Giorgio Francia	Alfa Romeo 155	+13.24s	4
8	1	(Spain) Adrian Campos	Alfa Romeo 155	+14.38s	3
9	15	(Spain) Miguel Angel de Castro	Alfa Romeo 155	+30.30s	2
DNF	6	(Italy) Alex Caffi	Opel Vectra GT	+2 laps	
DNF	14	(Spain) Iñaki Goiboru	Alfa Romeo 155	+3 laps	

=== Championship standings after Round 6 ===
Drivers' Championship standings

Pos	Driver	Points
1	(Spain) Jordi Gene	135
2	(Spain) Luis Villamil	128
3	(Belgium) Eric van de Poele	128
4	(Italy) Giorgio Francia	100
5	(Spain) Antonio Albacete	95

Constructors' Championship standings

Pos	Constructor	Points
1	(Italy) Alfa Romeo	196
2	(Japan) Nissan	167
3	(Germany) Opel	150
4	(United States) Ford	38

== Round 7 (Spain) Circuito de Albacete ==
Qualifying

Pos	No	Driver	Car	Lap Time	Super Pole
1	5	(Spain) Jordi Gene	Opel Vectra GT	1.36.549	SP
2	1	(Spain) Adrian Campos	Alfa Romeo 155	1.37.019	SP
3	33	(Belgium) Eric van de Poele	Nissan Primera eGT	1.37.210	SP
4	23	(Spain) Luis Pérez-Sala	Nissan Primera eGT	1.37.593	SP
5	6	(Italy) Alex Caffi	Opel Vectra GT	1.37.831	SP
6	3	(Spain) Luis Villamil	Alfa Romeo 155	1.37.975	SP
7	13	(Andorra) Joan Vinyes	Nissan Primera eGT	1.37.072	
8	4	(Italy) Giorgio Francia	Alfa Romeo 155	1.37.111	
9	2	(Spain) Antonio Albacete	BMW 318iS	1.37.593	
10	14	(Spain) Iñaki Goiboru	Alfa Romeo 155	1.38.613	
11	101	(Italy) Gianni Giudici	Alfa Romeo 155	1.40.075	

Race 1

Pos	No	Driver	Constructor	Time/Retired	Points
1	1	(Spain) Adrian Campos	Alfa Romeo 155	12 laps in 19:50.13	20
2	5	(Spain) Jordi Gene	Opel Vectra GT	+0.620s	15
3	33	(Belgium) Eric van de Poele	Nissan Primera eGT	+2.683s	12
4	6	(Italy) Alex Caffi	Opel Vectra GT	+8.758s	10
5	23	(Spain) Luis Pérez-Sala	Nissan Primera eGT	+10.573s	8
6	3	(Spain) Luis Villamil	Alfa Romeo 155	+11.393s	6
7	4	(Italy) Giorgio Francia	Alfa Romeo 155	+15.764s	4
8	2	(Spain) Antonio Albacete	BMW 318iS	+18.081s	3
9	13	(Andorra) Joan Vinyes	Nissan Primera eGT	+21.263s	2
10	14	(Spain) Iñaki Goiboru	Alfa Romeo 155	+26.659s	1
11	101	(Italy) Gianni Giudici	Alfa Romeo 155	+38.295s	

Race 2

Pos	No	Driver	Constructor	Time/Retired	Points
1	1	(Spain) Adrian Campos	Alfa Romeo 155	12 laps in 19:49.082	20
2	2	(Spain) Antonio Albacete	BMW 318iS	+0.930s	15
3	5	(Spain) Jordi Gene	Opel Vectra GT	+2.716s	12
4	6	(Italy) Alex Caffi	Opel Vectra GT	+10.241s	10
5	4	(Italy) Giorgio Francia	Alfa Romeo 155	+10.867s	8
6	3	(Spain) Luis Villamil	Alfa Romeo 155	+11.522s	6
7	23	(Spain) Luis Pérez-Sala	Nissan Primera eGT	+12.835s	4
8	13	(Andorra) Joan Vinyes	Nissan Primera eGT	+18.322s	3
9	101	(Italy) Gianni Giudici	Alfa Romeo 155	+28.085s	
10	33	(Belgium) Eric van de Poele	Nissan Primera eGT	+28.714s	2
11	14	(Spain) Iñaki Goiboru	Alfa Romeo 155	+45.961s	1

=== Championship standings after Round 7 ===
Drivers' Championship standings

Pos	Driver	Points
1	(Spain) Jordi Gene	162
2	(Spain) Luis Villamil	137
3	(Spain) Adrian Campos	124
4	(Spain) Antonio Albacete	113
5	(Belgium) Eric van de Poele	112

Constructors' Championship standings

Pos	Constructor	Points
1	(Italy) Alfa Romeo	231
2	(Japan) Nissan	195
3	(Germany) Opel	183
4	(United States) Ford	38

== Round 8 (Spain) Circuito de Jerez ==
Qualifying

Pos	No	Driver	Car	Lap Time	Super Pole
1	23	(Spain) Luis Pérez-Sala	Nissan Primera eGT	1.49.01	SP
2	3	(Spain) Luis Villamil	Alfa Romeo 155	1.49.20	SP
3	6	(Italy) Alex Caffi	Opel Vectra GT	1.49.29	SP
4	102	(Scotland) Anthony Reid	Opel Vectra GT	1.49.35	SP
5	5	(Spain) Jordi Gene	Opel Vectra GT	1.51.84	SP
6	101	(Italy) Giampiero Simoni	Alfa Romeo 155	no time	SP
7	2	(Spain) Antonio Albacete	BMW 318iS	1.48.92	
8	4	(Italy) Giorgio Francia	Alfa Romeo 155	1.49.23	
9	33	(Belgium) Eric van de Poele	Nissan Primera eGT	1.49.45	
10	1	(Spain) Adrian Campos	Alfa Romeo 155	1.49.48	
11	13	(Andorra) Joan Vinyes	Nissan Primera eGT	1.50.22	
12	14	(Spain) Iñaki Goiburu	Alfa Romeo 155	1.51.74	

Race 1

Pos	No	Driver	Constructor	Time/Retired	Points
1	3	(Spain) Luis Villamil	Alfa Romeo 155	10 laps in 19:33.87	20
2	6	(Italy) Alex Caffi	Opel Vectra GT	+1.47s	15
3	2	(Spain) Antonio Albacete	BMW 318iS	+3.97s	12
4	33	(Belgium) Eric van de Poele	Nissan Primera eGT	+4.93s	10
5	101	(Italy) Giampiero Simoni	Alfa Romeo 155	+8.27s	
6	5	(Spain) Jordi Gene	Opel Vectra GT	+8.94s	8
7	23	(Spain) Luis Pérez-Sala	Nissan Primera eGT	+16.65s	6
8	102	(Scotland) Anthony Reid	Opel Vectra GT	+10.01s	
9	4	(Italy) Giorgio Francia	Alfa Romeo 155	+10.61s	4
10	1	(Spain) Adrian Campos	Alfa Romeo 155	+17.89s	3
11	13	(Andorra) Joan Vinyes	Nissan Primera eGT	+18.68s	2
12	14	(Spain) Iñaki Goiboru	Alfa Romeo 155	+30.11s	1

Race 2

Pos	No	Driver	Constructor	Time/Retired	Points
1	2	(Spain) Antonio Albacete	BMW 318iS	10 laps in 18:36.59	20
2	3	(Spain) Luis Villamil	Alfa Romeo 155	+0.57s	15
3	101	(Italy) Giampiero Simoni	Alfa Romeo 155	+1.42s	
4	33	(Belgium) Eric van de Poele	Nissan Primera eGT	+1.95s	12
5	5	(Spain) Jordi Gene	Opel Vectra GT	+2.55s	10
6	23	(Spain) Luis Pérez-Sala	Nissan Primera eGT	+3.44s	8
7	102	(Scotland) Anthony Reid	Opel Vectra GT	+4.34s	
8	1	(Spain) Adrian Campos	Alfa Romeo 155	+7.45s	6
9	13	(Andorra) Joan Vinyes	Nissan Primera eGT	+13.40s	4
10	4	(Italy) Giorgio Francia	Alfa Romeo 155	+18.53s	3
DSQ	6	(Italy) Alex Caffi	Opel Vectra GT	+35.97s	
11	14	(Spain) Iñaki Goiboru	Alfa Romeo 155	+51.58s	2

=== Championship standings after Round 8 ===
Drivers' Championship standings

Pos	Driver	Points
1	(Spain) Jordi Gene	180
2	(Spain) Luis Villamil	172
3	(Spain) Antonio Albacete	145
4	(Belgium) Eric van de Poele	134
5	(Spain) Adrian Campos	133

Constructors' Championship standings

Pos	Constructor	Points
1	(Italy) Alfa Romeo	266
2	(Japan) Nissan	226
3	(Germany) Opel	207
4	(United States) Ford	38

== Round 9 (Spain) Circuit de Barcelona-Catalunya ==
Qualifying

Pos	No	Driver	Car	Lap Time	Super Pole
1	33	(Belgium) Eric van de Poele	Nissan Primera eGT	1.13.256	SP
2	1	(Spain) Adrian Campos	Alfa Romeo 155	1.13.410	SP
3	102	(Scotland) Anthony Reid	Opel Vectra GT	1.13.410	SP
4	5	(Spain) Jordi Gene	Opel Vectra GT	1.13.472	SP
5	6	(Italy) Alex Caffi	Opel Vectra GT	1.14.003	SP
6	123	(Italy) Ivan Capelli	Nissan Primera eGT	1.15.250	SP
7	3	(Spain) Luis Villamil	Alfa Romeo 155	1.13.862	
8	101	(Italy) Giampiero Simoni	Alfa Romeo 155	1.14.872	
9	4	(Italy) Giorgio Francia	Alfa Romeo 155	1.13.946	
10	13	(Andorra) Joan Vinyes	Nissan Primera eGT	1.14.198	
11	2	(Spain) Antonio Albacete	BMW 318iS	1.14.198	
12	14	(Spain) Iñaki Goiburu	Alfa Romeo 155	1.16.481	
13	103	(Spain) Xavier Riera	BMW 318iS	1.18.246	
14	23	(Spain) Luis Pérez-Sala	Nissan Primera eGT	no time	

Race 1

Pos	No	Driver	Constructor	Time/Retired	Points
1	33	(Belgium) Eric van de Poele	Nissan Primera eGT	14 laps in 17:31.379	20
2	5	(Spain) Jordi Gene	Opel Vectra GT	+3.026s	15
3	6	(Italy) Alex Caffi	Opel Vectra GT	+9.473s	12
4	3	(Spain) Luis Villamil	Alfa Romeo 155	+9.845s	10
5	102	(Scotland) Anthony Reid	Opel Vectra GT	+10.425s	
6	101	(Italy) Giampiero Simoni	Alfa Romeo 155	+16.425s	
7	123	(Italy) Ivan Capelli	Nissan Primera eGT	+18.119s	
8	2	(Spain) Antonio Albacete	BMW 318iS	+18.404s	8
9	4	(Italy) Giorgio Francia	Alfa Romeo 155	+18.766s	6
10	14	(Spain) Iñaki Goiburu	Alfa Romeo 155	+56.528s	4
11	103	(Spain) Xavier Riera	BMW 318iS	+1 lap	
DNF	13	(Andorra) Joan Vinyes	Nissan Primera eGT	+9 laps	
DNF	1	(Spain) Adrian Campos	Alfa Romeo 155	+12 laps	
DNS	23	(Spain) Luis Pérez-Sala	Nissan Primera eGT		

Race 2

Pos	No	Driver	Constructor	Time/Retired	Points
1	33	(Belgium) Eric van de Poele	Nissan Primera eGT	14 laps in 17:26.376	20
2	5	(Spain) Jordi Gene	Opel Vectra GT	+3.255s	15
3	102	(Scotland) Anthony Reid	Opel Vectra GT	+3.743s	
4	3	(Spain) Luis Villamil	Alfa Romeo 155	+7.043s	12
5	6	(Italy) Alex Caffi	Opel Vectra GT	+7.983s	10
6	101	(Italy) Giampiero Simoni	Alfa Romeo 155	+9.128s	
7	4	(Italy) Giorgio Francia	Alfa Romeo 155	+12.113s	8
8	123	(Italy) Ivan Capelli	Nissan Primera eGT	+13.462s	
9	14	(Spain) Iñaki Goiburu	Alfa Romeo 155	+50.939s	6
10	103	(Spain) Xavier Riera	BMW 318iS	+1 lap	
DNF	1	(Spain) Adrian Campos	Alfa Romeo 155	+7 laps	
DNF	2	(Spain) Antonio Albacete	BMW 318iS	+14 laps	
DNS	13	(Andorra) Joan Vinyes	Nissan Primera eGT		
DNS	23	(Spain) Luis Pérez-Sala	Nissan Primera eGT		

=== Championship standings after Round 9 ===
Drivers' Championship standings

Pos	Driver	Points
1	(Spain) Jordi Gene	210
2	(Spain) Luis Villamil	194
3	(Belgium) Eric van de Poele	174
4	(Spain) Antonio Albacete	153
5	(Spain) Adrian Campos	62

Constructors' Championship standings

Pos	Constructor	Points
1	(Italy) Alfa Romeo	293
2	(Japan) Nissan	250
3	(Germany) Opel	242
4	(United States) Ford	38

== Round 10 (Spain) Circuito del Jarama ==
Qualifying

Pos	No	Driver	Car	Lap Time	Super Pole
1	2	(Spain) Antonio Albacete	BMW 318iS	1.49.740	SP
2	4	(Italy) Giorgio Francia	Alfa Romeo 155	1.50.147	SP
3	123	(Italy) Ivan Capelli	Nissan Primera eGT	1.51.200	SP
4	3	(Spain) Luis Villamil	Alfa Romeo 155	1.51.328	SP
5	23	(Spain) Luis Pérez-Sala	Nissan Primera eGT	1.52.577	SP
6	5	(Spain) Jordi Gene	Opel Vectra GT	1.52.595	SP
7	6	(Italy) Alex Caffi	Opel Vectra GT	1.48.058	
8	14	(Spain) Iñaki Goiburu	Alfa Romeo 155	1.48.107	
9	13	(Andorra) Joan Vinyes	Nissan Primera eGT	1.48.509	
10	1	(Spain) Adrian Campos	Alfa Romeo 155	1.49.965	
11	102	(Italy) Felice Tedeschi	Alfa Romeo 155	1.51.749	
12	9	(Spain) Alex Villanueva	BMW 318iS	2.24.545	
13	103	(Spain) Xavier Riera	BMW 318iS	no time	

Race 1

Pos	No	Driver	Constructor	Time/Retired	Points
1	2	(Spain) Antonio Albacete	BMW 318iS	11 laps in 18:36.979	20
2	23	(Spain) Luis Pérez-Sala	Nissan Primera eGT	+3.772s	15
3	123	(Italy) Ivan Capelli	Nissan Primera eGT	+6.200s	
4	3	(Spain) Luis Villamil	Alfa Romeo 155	+20.347s	12
5	4	(Italy) Giorgio Francia	Alfa Romeo 155	+21.934s	10
6	13	(Andorra) Joan Vinyes	Nissan Primera eGT	+24.185s	8
7	1	(Spain) Adrian Campos	Alfa Romeo 155	+25.275s	6
8	14	(Spain) Iñaki Goiburu	Alfa Romeo 155	+25.482s	4
9	102	(Italy) Felice Tedeschi	Alfa Romeo 155	+31.122s	
DNF	5	(Spain) Jordi Gene	Opel Vectra GT	+6 laps	
DNF	6	(Italy) Alex Caffi	Opel Vectra GT	+8 laps	
DNF	9	(Spain) Alex Villanueva	BMW 318iS	+10 laps	
DNF	103	(Spain) Xavier Riera	BMW 318iS	+10 laps	

Race 2

Pos	No	Driver	Constructor	Time/Retired	Points
1	2	(Spain) Antonio Albacete	BMW 318iS	11 laps in 18:32.437	20
2	23	(Spain) Luis Pérez-Sala	Nissan Primera eGT	+3.348s	15
3	123	(Italy) Ivan Capelli	Nissan Primera eGT	+7.210s	
4	3	(Spain) Luis Villamil	Alfa Romeo 155	+10.336s	12
5	14	(Spain) Iñaki Goiburu	Alfa Romeo 155	+13.316s	10
6	13	(Andorra) Joan Vinyes	Nissan Primera eGT	+14.678s	8
7	4	(Italy) Giorgio Francia	Alfa Romeo 155	+15.207s	6
8	5	(Spain) Jordi Gene	Opel Vectra GT	+15.710s	4
9	1	(Spain) Adrian Campos	Alfa Romeo 155	+17.668s	3
DNF	6	(Italy) Alex Caffi	Opel Vectra GT	+6 laps	
DNF	102	(Italy) Felice Tedeschi	Alfa Romeo 155	+9 laps	
DNS	9	(Spain) Alex Villanueva	BMW 318iS		
DNS	103	(Spain) Xavier Riera	BMW 318iS		

=== Championship standings after Round 10 ===
Drivers' Championship standings

Pos	Driver	Points
1	(Spain) Luis Villamil	(221) 214 after 3 worse results
2	(Spain) Jordi Gene	(214) 210 after 3 worse results
3	(Belgium) Eric van de Poele	204 after 3 worse results
4	(Spain) Antonio Albacete	193 after 3 worse results
5	(Italy) Giorgio Francia	149 after 3 worse results

Constructors' Championship standings

Pos	Constructor	Points
1	(Italy) Alfa Romeo	328
2	(Japan) Nissan	288
3	(Germany) Opel	248
4	(United States) Ford	38

== Championship results ==
Points system
**1st**	**2nd**	**3rd**	**4th**	**5th**	**6th**	**7th**	**8th**	**9th**	**10th**
20	15	12	10	8	6	4	3	2	1

- 17 results from 20 are valid for the championship

=== Drivers' Championship ===
Pos	Driver	Car	JER (Spain)		JAR (Spain)		BAR (Spain)		EST (Portugal)		ALB (Spain)		CAL (Spain)		ALB (Spain)		JER (Spain)		BAR (Spain)		JAR (Spain)		Pts
1	(Spain) Luis Villamil	Alfa Romeo	4	2	3	1	12	(7)	2	1	(8)	2	6	5	6	6	1	2	4	4	4	4	**214** (221)
2	(Spain) Jordi Gene	Opel	2	6	12	7	3	2	3	3	2	1	3	3	2	3	6	5	2	2	Ret	(8)	**210** (214)
3	(Belgium) Eric van de Poele	Nissan	3	Ret	2	8	2	1	4	2	Ret	5	1	4	3	10	4	4	1	1	EX	EX	**205**
4	(Spain) Antonio Albacete	BMW	1	1	DSQ	3	5	4	EX	EX	Ret	Ret	4	2	8	2	3	1	8	Ret	1	1	**193**
5	(Italy) Giorgio Francia	Alfa Romeo	12	4	1	2	6	Ret	1	Ret	4	5	8	7	7	5	9	10	9	7	5	7	**149**
6	(Spain) Luis Pérez-Sala	Nissan	7	5	4	9	DNS	DNS	8	6	1	Ret	2	1	5	4	7	6	DNS	DNS	2	2	**144**
7	(Spain) Adrian Campos	Alfa Romeo	6	3	5	4	4	8	Ret	4	5	4	7	8	1	1	10	8	Ret	Ret	7	9	**142**
8	(Italy) Alex Caffi	Opel	5	Ret	7	5	1	3	10	Ret	3	Ret	Ret	10	4	4	2	DSQ	3	5	Ret	Ret	**123**
9	(Andorra) Joan Vinyes	Nissan	DNS	DNS	Ret	DNS	7	6	5	5	6	6	5	6	9	8	11	9	Ret	DNS	6	6	**79**
10	(Spain) Iñaki Goiburu	Alfa Romeo			6	6	Ret	DNS			7	Ret	10	Ret	10	11	12	11	10	9	8	5	**46**
11	(Spain) Jesus Diez Villarroel	BMW	11	7	8	11	8	5	6	Ret	10	7											**29**
12	(Spain) Carlos Palau	Ford	8	9	9	Ret	Ret	DNS	7	7	12	Ret											**15**
13	(Spain) Jesús Pareja	Ford	9	8	Ret	10	Ret	DNS	Ret	8	11	8											**12**
14	(Spain) Miguel Angel de Castro	Alfa Romeo					9	Ret	9	DNS	9	9	9	9									**12**
15	(Spain) Ricardo Garcia Galiano	Seat	10	DNS	10	12	10	9															**5**
16	(Spain) Rafael Barrios	Seat	Ret	DNS	Ret	DNS	11	10															**1**
16	(Spain) Alex Villanueva	BMW	13	10																	Ret	DNS	**1**
16	(Italy) Luigi Mazzali	BMW			11	13	Ret	DNS	12	Ret	Ret	10											**1**
Guest drivers ineligible for points
	(Spain) David Bosch	Opel	Ret	DNS																			**0**
	(Italy) Gianni Giudici	Alfa Romeo													11	9							**0**
	(Italy) Giampiero Simoni	Alfa Romeo															5	3	6	6			**0**
	(Scotland) Anthony Read	Alfa Romeo															8	7	5	3			**0**
	(Spain) Xavier Riera	BMW																	11	10	Ret	DNS	**0**
	(Italy) Ivan Capelli	Nissan																	7	8	3	3	**0**
	(Italy) Felice Tedeschi	Alfa Romeo																			9	Ret	**0**
Pos	Driver	Car	JER (Spain)		JAR (Spain)		BAR (Spain)		EST (Portugal)		ALB (Spain)		CAL (Spain)		ALB (Spain)		JER (Spain)		BAR (Spain)		JAR (Spain)		

Colour	Result
Gold	Winner
Silver	Second place
Bronze	Third place
Green	Points classification
Blue	Non-points classification
Blue	Non-classified finish (NC)
Purple	Retired, not classified (Ret)
Red	Did not qualify (DNQ)
Red	Did not pre-qualify (DNPQ)
Black	Disqualified (DSQ)
White	Did not start (DNS)
White	Withdrew (WD)
White	Race cancelled (C)
Blank	Did not practice (DNP)
Blank	Did not arrive (DNA)
Blank	Excluded (EX)

**Bold** – Pole
Italics – Fastest Lap

=== Manufacturers' Trophy ===
Manufactures' Points system
**1st**	**2nd**	**3rd**	**4th**	**5th**	**6th**	**7th**	**8th**	**9th**	**10th**
12	10	8	7	6	5	4	3	2	1

Pos	Manufacturer	JER (Spain)		JAR (Spain)		BAR (Spain)		EST (Portugal)		ALB (Spain)		CAL (Spain)		ALB (Spain)		JER (Spain)		BAR (Spain)		JAR (Spain)		Pts
1	(Italy) Alfa Romeo	4	2	1	1	4	7	1	1	4	2	6	5	1	1	1	2	4	4	4	4	328
1	(Italy) Alfa Romeo	6	3	3	2	6	8	2	4	5	3	7	7	6	5	5	3	6	6	5	5	328
2	(Japan) Nissan	3	5	2	8	2	1	4	2	1	5	1	1	3	7	4	4	1	1	2	2	288
2	(Japan) Nissan	7	Ret	4	9	7	6	5	5	6	6	2	4	5	8	7	6	7	8	3	3	288
3	(Germany) Opel	2	6	7	5	1	2	3	3	2	1	3	3	2	3	2	5	2	2	Ret	8	248
3	(Germany) Opel	5	Ret	12	7	3	3	10	Ret	3	Ret	Ret	Ret	4	4	6	7	3	3	Ret	Ret	248
4	(United States) Ford	8	8	9	10	Ret	Ret	7	7	11	8											38
4	(United States) Ford	9	9	Ret	Ret	Ret	Ret	Ret	8	12	Ret											38
Manufacture ineligible to score points
	(Germany) BMW	1	1	8	3	5	4	6	Ret	10	7	4	2	8	2	3	1	8	10	1	1	
	(Germany) BMW	11	7	11	11	8	5	12	Ret	Ret	10							11	Ret			

Colour	Result
Gold	Winner
Silver	Second place
Bronze	Third place
Green	Points classification
Blue	Non-points classification
Blue	Non-classified finish (NC)
Purple	Retired, not classified (Ret)
Red	Did not qualify (DNQ)
Red	Did not pre-qualify (DNPQ)
Black	Disqualified (DSQ)
White	Did not start (DNS)
White	Withdrew (WD)
White	Race cancelled (C)
Blank	Did not practice (DNP)
Blank	Did not arrive (DNA)
Blank	Excluded (EX)
