= 1996 Campeonato de España de Turismos =

Seasons
- ← 1995 1997 →

The 1996 Campeonato de España de Turismos was won by Jordi Gene with Audi A4 Quattro; the German manufacturer won the constructors' championship.

== Teams and drivers ==
Team	Car	No.	Drivers	Rounds	Class
(Spain) Opel Team Ibérico	Opel Vectra 16V	1	(Spain) Luis Villamil	All	
(Spain) Opel Team Ibérico	Opel Vectra 16V	2	(Portugal) Ni Amorim	1-5	
(Spain) Opel Team Ibérico	Opel Vectra 16V	2	(Italy) Roberto Colciago	6-8	
(Spain) Teo Martin Motorsport	BMW 318iS	3	(Portugal) Pedro Chaves	1-6	
(Spain) Teo Martin Motorsport	BMW 320i	3	(Portugal) Pedro Chaves	7-8	
(Spain) Audi Racing Team Espaňa	Audi A4 Quattro	4	(Spain) Jordi Gené	All	
(Spain) Team Gauloises Blondes	Opel Vectra GT	5	(Spain) Miguel Ángel de Castro	1	P
(Spain) Team Gauloises Blondes	Opel Vectra GT	6	(Spain) Pablo de Villota	1	P
(Spain) Meycom	Alfa Romeo 155 TS	7	(Spain) Antonio Albacete	1-3, 6, 8	P
(Spain) Meycom	Alfa Romeo 155 TS	7	(Spain) Ricardo García Galiano	7	P
(Spain) José Ruiz Thiery	Alfa Romeo 155 TS	8	(Spain) Iñaki Goiburu	1-3, 5-6, 8	P
(Spain) José Ruiz Thiery	Alfa Romeo 155 TS	8	(Spain) Alberto Ruíz Thiery	7	P
(Spain) Xavier Riera	BMW 318iS	9	(Spain) Xavier Riera	All	P
(Spain) Procar Explotaciones	BMW 318iS	10	(Spain) Jon Andreescu	3-8	P
(Belgium) Ecurie Bruxelloise	Volkswagen Golf GTi	11	(Belgium) Bernard Winderickx	1-2	P
(Spain) Pedro Paz	SEAT Toledo GT	12	(Spain) David Bosch	1-7	P
(Spain) Pedro Paz	BMW 318iS	12	(Spain) David Bosch	8	P
(Italy) Ciemme Corse	Opel Vectra GT	14	(Italy) Danilo Mozzi	2	P
(Italy) Danilo Mozzi	Opel Vectra GT	14	(Italy) Danilo Mozzi	5	P
(Italy) Danilo Mozzi	Opel Vectra GT	14	(Spain) Balba González-Camino	7	P
(Belgium) Ecurie Bruxelloise	BMW 318iS	22	(Belgium) Robert Dierick	1	P
(Spain) Team Repsol Nissan	Nissan Primera eGT	23	(Spain) Luis Pérez-Sala	All	
(Spain) Team Repsol Nissan	Nissan Primera eGT	33	(Belgium) Eric van de Poele	All	
(Spain) Audi Racing Team Espaňa	Audi A4 Quattro	44	(Andorra) Joan Vinyes	All	
Not eligible to score championship points
(Spain) Team Repsol Nissan	Nissan Primera eGT	100	(Italy) Ivan Capelli	7-8	
(France) SDA Sport	BMW 318iS	100	(France) Eric Cayrolle	5	
(France) SDA Sport	Opel Vectra GT	101	(France) Maurice Pérus	5	
(Spain) Escuderia Baix Empordà	BMW 318iS	101	(Spain) Francesc Gutiérrez	7-8	
(Italy) EC Motorsport	Alfa Romeo 155 TS	102	(Italy) Luca Riccitelli	8	
(Spain) Gamace MC Competición	Nissan Primera eGT	103	(Spain) Joan Armadans	8	
(Spain) Audi Racing Team Espaňa	Audi A4 Quattro	104	(Italy) Tamara Vidali	7-8	
(Belgium) Willy Maljean	BMW 318iS	105	(Belgium) Willy Maljean	7	
(France) Gemo Sport	Peugeot 405 Mi16	105	(France) Eric Cayrolle	8	
(Spain) Escuderia Baix Empordà	Opel Vectra GT	106	(Spain) Josep Bassas	8	
(France) Patrick Herbert	BMW 318iS	106	(France) Patrick Herbert	7	
(Italy) Giambattista Busi	Opel Vectra GT	107	(Italy) Giambattista Busi	8	
(Spain) Audi Racing Team Espaňa	Audi A4	114	(France) Yvan Muller	6	
(Spain) Audi Racing Team Espaňa	Audi A4	144	(Austria) Ralf Kalaschek	6	
Not eligible to score Manufacturers points
(Italy) Nordauto Engineering	Alfa Romeo 155 TS	155	(Italy) Fabrizio Giovanardi	3, 5-8	
(Italy) Nordauto Engineering	Alfa Romeo 155 TS	156	(Italy) Paolo Delle Piane	3, 5-8	

Icon	Class
P	Private Drivers

== Race calendar and results ==
Round		Circuit	Date	Pole position	Fastest lap	Winning driver	Winning team
1	R1	(Spain) Jarama	19 May	(Portugal) Pedro Chaves	(Spain) Jordi Gené	(Spain) Jordi Gené	(Spain) Audi Racing Team Espaňa
1	R2	(Spain) Jarama	19 May		(Andorra) Joan Vinyes	(Belgium) Eric van de Poele	(Spain) Team Repsol Nissan
2	R1	(Spain) Albacete	9 Jun	(Spain) Jordi Gené	(Spain) Jordi Gené	(Spain) Jordi Gené	(Spain) Audi Racing Team Espaňa
2	R2	(Spain) Albacete	9 Jun		(Spain) Jordi Gené	(Spain) Jordi Gené	(Spain) Audi Racing Team Espaňa
3	R1	(Spain) Barcelona	30 Jun	(Italy) Fabrizio Giovanardi	(Andorra) Joan Vinyes	(Spain) Jordi Gené	(Spain) Audi Racing Team Espaňa
3	R2	(Spain) Barcelona	30 Jun		(Andorra) Joan Vinyes	(Italy) Fabrizio Giovanardi	(Italy) Nordauto Engineering
4	R1	(Portugal) Estoril	8 Sep	(Spain) Jordi Gené	(Spain) Jordi Gené	(Spain) Jordi Gené	(Spain) Audi Racing Team Espaňa
4	R2	(Portugal) Estoril	8 Sep		(Spain) Luis Villamil	(Portugal) Pedro Chaves	(Spain) Teo Martin Motorsport
5	R1	(Spain) Calafat	22 Sep	(Spain) Luis Pérez-Sala	(Spain) Luis Pérez-Sala	(Spain) Luis Pérez-Sala	(Spain) Team Repsol Nissan
5	R2	(Spain) Calafat	22 Sep		(Spain) Jordi Gené	(Spain) Luis Pérez-Sala	(Spain) Team Repsol Nissan
6	R1	(Spain) Jerez	27 Oct	(Italy) Fabrizio Giovanardi	(Portugal) Pedro Chaves	(Portugal) Pedro Chaves	(Spain) Teo Martin Motorsport
6	R2	(Spain) Jerez	27 Oct		(Belgium) Eric van de Poele	(Italy) Fabrizio Giovanardi	(Italy) Nordauto Engineering
7	R1	(Spain) Jarama	10 Nov	(Spain) Luis Pérez-Sala	(Italy) Roberto Colciago	(Portugal) Pedro Chaves	(Spain) Teo Martin Motorsport
7	R2	(Spain) Jarama	10 Nov		(Spain) Luis Pérez-Sala	(Portugal) Pedro Chaves	(Spain) Teo Martin Motorsport
8	R1	(Spain) Barcelona	24 Nov	(Italy) Fabrizio Giovanardi	(Italy) Fabrizio Giovanardi	(Italy) Fabrizio Giovanardi	(Italy) Nordauto Engineering
8	R2	(Spain) Barcelona	24 Nov		(Belgium) Eric van de Poele	(Belgium) Eric van de Poele	(Spain) Team Repsol Nissan

== Round 1 (Spain) Circuito del Jarama ==
Qualifying

Pos	No	Driver	Car	Lap Time	Super Pole
1	3	(Portugal) Pedro Matos Chaves	BMW 318iS	1.49.127	
2	4	(Spain) Jordi Gene	Audi A4 Quattro	1.49.567	
3	1	(Spain) Luis Villamil	Opel Vectra 16V	1.50.016	
4	2	(Portugal) Ni Amorim	Opel Vectra 16V	1.50.906	
5	44	(Andorra) Joan Vinyes	Audi A4 Quattro	1.50.913	
6	23	(Spain) Luis Pérez-Sala	Nissan Primera eGT	1.51.121	
7	5	(Spain) Miguel Ángel de Castro	Opel Vectra GT	1.51.204	
8	6	(Spain) Pablo de Villota	Opel Vectra GT	1.54.678	
9	7	(Spain) Antonio Albacete	Alfa Romeo 155 TS	1.56.257	
10	8	(Spain) Iñaki Goiburu	Alfa Romeo 155 TS	1.57.579	
11	11	(Belgium) Bernard Winderickx	Volkswagen Golf GTi	2.00.630	
12	22	(Belgium) Robert Dierick	BMW 318iS	2.00.712	
13	9	(Spain) Xavier Riera	BMW 318iS	2.05.671	
14	33	(Belgium) Eric van de Poele	Nissan Primera eGT	no time	
15	12	(Spain) David Bosch	SEAT Toledo GT	no time	

- Super pole session cancelled due to a thunderstorm

Race 1

Pos	No	Driver	Constructor	Time/Retired	Points
1	4	(Spain) Jordi Gene	Audi A4 Quattro	12 laps 20:17.420	20
2	44	(Andorra) Joan Vinyes	Audi A4 Quattro	+1.450s	15
3	3	(Portugal) Pedro Matos Chaves	BMW 318iS	+10.973s	12
4	1	(Spain) Luis Villamil	Opel Vectra 16V	+14.494s	10
5	33	(Belgium) Eric van de Poele	Nissan Primera eGT	+14.764s	8
6	2	(Portugal) Ni Amorim	Opel Vectra 16V	+19.182s	6
7	5	(Spain) Miguel Ángel de Castro	Opel Vectra GT	+31.298s	4
8	23	(Spain) Luis Pérez-Sala	Nissan Primera eGT	+37.578s	3
9	7	(Spain) Antonio Albacete	Alfa Romeo 155 TS	+39.850s	2
10	8	(Spain) Iñaki Goiburu	Alfa Romeo 155 TS	+46.577s	1
11	9	(Spain) Xavier Riera	BMW 318iS	+1.13.477s	
12	11	(Belgium) Bernard Winderickx	Volkswagen Golf GTi	+1.21.464s	
13	22	(Belgium) Robert Dierick	BMW 318iS	+1.21.532s	
DNF	6	(Spain) Pablo de Villota	Opel Vectra GT	+5 laps	
DNS	12	(Spain) David Bosch	SEAT Toledo GT		

Race 2

Pos	No	Driver	Constructor	Time/Retired	Points
1	33	(Belgium) Eric van de Poele	Nissan Primera eGT	12 laps 20:27.049	20
2	4	(Spain) Jordi Gene	Audi A4 Quattro	+0.369s	15
3	44	(Andorra) Joan Vinyes	Audi A4 Quattro	+0.651s	12
4	3	(Portugal) Pedro Matos Chaves	BMW 318iS	+2.300s	10
5	2	(Portugal) Ni Amorim	Opel Vectra 16V	+2.750s	8
6	1	(Spain) Luis Villamil	Opel Vectra 16V	+3.038s	6
7	5	(Spain) Miguel Ángel de Castro	Opel Vectra GT	+14.109s	4
8	8	(Spain) Iñaki Goiburu	Alfa Romeo 155 TS	+19.431s	3
9	7	(Spain) Antonio Albacete	Alfa Romeo 155 TS	+24.011s	2
10	9	(Spain) Xavier Riera	BMW 318iS	+55.432s	1
11	22	(Belgium) Robert Dierick	BMW 318iS	+1.05.151s	
12	11	(Belgium) Bernard Winderickx	Volkswagen Golf GTi	+1.15.362s	
DNF	6	(Spain) Pablo de Villota	Opel Vectra GT	+8 laps	
DNS	23	(Spain) Luis Pérez-Sala	Nissan Primera eGT		
DNS	12	(Spain) David Bosch	SEAT Toledo GT		

=== Championship standings after Round 1 ===
Drivers' Championship standings

Pos	Driver	Points
1	(Spain) Jordi Gene	35
2	(Belgium) Eric van de Poele	28
3	(Andorra) Joan Vinyes	27
4	(Portugal) Pedro Matos Chaves	22
5	(Spain) Luis Villamil	16

Constructors' Championship standings

Pos	Constructor	Points
1	(Germany) Audi	40
2	(Germany) Opel	23
3	(Japan) Nissan	21
4	(Germany) BMW	16

== Round 2 (Spain) Circuito de Albacete ==
Qualifying

Pos	No	Driver	Car	Lap Time	Super Pole
1	4	(Spain) Jordi Gene	Audi A4 Quattro	1.36.131	SP
2	44	(Andorra) Joan Vinyes	Audi A4 Quattro	1.36.246	SP
3	23	(Spain) Luis Pérez-Sala	Nissan Primera eGT	1.37.210	SP
4	1	(Spain) Luis Villamil	Opel Vectra 16V	1.37.721	SP
5	3	(Portugal) Pedro Matos Chaves	BMW 318iS	1.37.991	SP
6	33	(Belgium) Eric van de Poele	Nissan Primera eGT	1.38.258	SP
7	2	(Portugal) Ni Amorim	Opel Vectra 16V	1.38.730	
8	14	(Italy) Danilo Mozzi	Opel Vectra GT	1.39.510	
9	8	(Spain) Iñaki Goiburu	Alfa Romeo 155 TS	1.39.543	
10	9	(Spain) Xavier Riera	BMW 318iS	1.42.475	
11	11	(Belgium) Bernard Winderickx	Volkswagen Golf GTi	1.43.234	
12	12	(Spain) David Bosch	SEAT Toledo GT	1.44.034	
13	7	(Spain) Antonio Albacete	Alfa Romeo 155 TS	1.44.064	

- Super pole session cancelled due to a thunderstorm

Race 1

Pos	No	Driver	Constructor	Time/Retired	Points
1	4	(Spain) Jordi Gene	Audi A4 Quattro	14 laps 23:17.023	20
2	23	(Spain) Luis Pérez-Sala	Nissan Primera eGT	+2.615s	15
3	1	(Spain) Luis Villamil	Opel Vectra 16V	+6.321s	12
4	33	(Belgium) Eric van de Poele	Nissan Primera eGT	+7.550s	10
5	3	(Portugal) Pedro Matos Chaves	BMW 318iS	+15.639s	8
6	8	(Spain) Iñaki Goiburu	Alfa Romeo 155 TS	+32.533s	6
7	7	(Spain) Antonio Albacete	Alfa Romeo 155 TS	+38.766s	4
8	14	(Italy) Danilo Mozzi	Opel Vectra GT	+53.186s	3
9	44	(Andorra) Joan Vinyes*	Audi A4 Quattro	+1.01.120s	2
10	11	(Belgium) Bernard Winderickx	Volkswagen Golf GTi	+1.23.919s	1
DNF	9	(Spain) Xavier Riera	BMW 318iS	+4 laps	
DNF	2	(Portugal) Ni Amorim	Opel Vectra 16V	+12 laps	
DNS	12	(Spain) David Bosch	SEAT Toledo GT		

- Vinyes: 1 minute penalty for excessive noise

Race 2

Pos	No	Driver	Constructor	Time/Retired	Points
1	4	(Spain) Jordi Gene	Audi A4 Quattro	14 laps in 23:33.008	20
2	33	(Belgium) Eric van de Poele	Nissan Primera eGT	+2.218s	15
3	2	(Portugal) Ni Amorin	Opel Vectra 16V	+3.596s	12
4	23	(Spain) Luis Pérez-Sala	Nissan Primera eGT	+20.477s	10
5	8	(Spain) Iñaki Goiburu	Alfa Romeo 155 TS	+30.043s	8
6	14	(Italy) Danilo Mozzi	Opel Vectra GT	+30.360s	6
7	7	(Spain) Antonio Albacete	Alfa Romeo 155 TS	+38.562s	4
8	1	(Spain) Luis Villamil	Opel Vectra 16V	+49.667s	3
9	44	(Andorra) Joan Vinyes*	Audi A4 Quattro	+58.574s	2
10	3	(Portugal) Pedro Matos Chaves	BMW 318iS	+1.05.170s	1
11	9	(Spain) Xavier Riera	BMW 318iS	+1.06.200s	
12	11	(Belgium) Bernard Winderickx	Volkswagen Golf GTi	+1.06.726s	
DNF	12	(Spain) David Bosch	SEAT Toledo GT	+13 laps	

- Vinyes: 1 minute penalty for excessive noise

=== Championship standings after Round 2 ===
Drivers' Championship standings

Pos	Driver	Points
1	(Spain) Jordi Gene	75
2	(Belgium) Eric van de Poele	53
3	(Andorra) Joan Vinyes	31
4	(Portugal) Pedro Matos Chaves	31
5	(Spain) Luis Villamil	31

Constructors' Championship standings

Pos	Constructor	Points
1	(Germany) Audi	68
2	(Japan) Nissan	53
3	(Germany) Opel	42
4	(Germany) BMW	23

== Championship standings ==
Points system
**1st**	**2nd**	**3rd**	**4th**	**5th**	**6th**	**7th**	**8th**	**9th**	**10th**
20	15	12	10	8	6	4	3	2	1

- 14 results from 16 are valid for the championship

=== Drivers' Championship ===
Pos	Driver	JAR (Spain)		ALB (Spain)		BAR (Spain)		EST (Portugal)		CAL (Spain)		JER (Spain)		JAR (Spain)		BAR (Spain)		Pts
1	(Spain) Jordi Gené	1	2	1	1	1	4	1	4	2	2	(6)	5	2	Ret	4	2	**213** (219)
2	(Portugal) Pedro Chaves	3	4	5	10	Ret	Ret	2	1	Ret	4	1	Ret	1	1	3	3	**160**
3	(Spain) Luis Pérez-Sala	(8)	DNS	2	4	3	6	5	5	1	1	5	3	6	7	6	4	**153** (156)
4	(Andorra) Joan Vinyes	2	3	(9)	(9)	5	2	3	3	8	3	7	6	7	5	2	5	**142** (146)
5	(Belgium) Eric van de Poele	5	1	4	2	4	Ret	9	7	4	8	3	2	Ret	8	7	1	**139**
6	(Italy) Fabrizio Giovanardi					2	1			3	6	2	1	9	6	1	Ret	**122**
7	(Spain) Luis Villamil	4	6	3	8	9	3	4	2	5	DSQ	4	4	8	9	5	Ret	**116**
8	(Portugal) Ni Amorim	6	5	Ret	3	7	5	10	6	6	5							**59**
9	(Spain) Iñaki Goiburu	10	8	6	5	8	7			9	7	9	7			10	10	**42**
10	(Italy) Roberto Colciago											Ret	DNS	4	3	Ret	Ret	**27**
11	(Italy) Paolo Delle Piane					6	Ret			7	Ref	8	Ret	10	10	14	8	**25**
12	(Spain) Antonio Albacete	9	9	7	7	Ret	8					10	8			Ret	Ret	**19**
13	(Spain) Xavier Riera	11	10	Ret	11	10	9	7	8	13	11	11	Ret	11	12	11	Ret	**17**
14	(Spain) Jon Andreescu					12	10	6	10	14	Ret	12	9	13	13	Ret	11	**13**
15	(Spain) David Bosch	DNS	DNS	DNS	Ret	11	Ret	8	9	Ret	12	Ret	10	Ret	Ret	8	9	**13**
16	(Italy) Danilo Mozzi			8	6					11	10							**12**
17	(Spain) Miguel Ángel de Castro	7	7															**8**
18	(Belgium) Bernard Winderickx	12	12	10	12													**1**
	(Spain) Pablo de Villota	Ret	Ret															**0**
Guest drivers ineligible for points
	(Italy) Ivan Capelli													(3)	(2)	Ret	(6)	**0**
	(Italy) Tamara Vidali													(5)	(4)	DSQ	(7)	**0**
	(France) Eric Cayrolle									(10)	(9)					15	Ret	**0**
	(Italy) Luca Riccitelli															9	12	**0**
	(Belgium) Robert Dierick	13	11															**0**
	(France) Maurice Pérus									12	Ret							**0**
	(Austria) Ralf Kalaschek											Ret	DNS					**0**
	(France) Yvan Muller											Ret	DNS					**0**
	(Spain) Francesc Gutiérrez													16	14	13	13	**0**
	(Spain) Ricardo GarcÍa Galiano													12	16			**0**
	(France) Patrick Herbert													Ret	11			**0**
	(Spain) Balba González-Camino													14	Ret			**0**
	(Belgium) Willy Maljean													15	15			**0**
	(Spain) Alberto Ruíz Thiery													Ret	Ret			**0**
	(Spain) Josep Bassas															12	14	**0**
	(Italy) Giambattista Busi															16	Ret	**0**
	(Spain) Joan Armadans															Ret	DNS	**0**
Pos	Driver	JAR (Spain)		ALB (Spain)		BAR (Spain)		EST (Portugal)		CAL (Spain)		JER (Spain)		JAR (Spain)		BAR (Spain)		

Colour	Result
Gold	Winner
Silver	Second place
Bronze	Third place
Green	Points classification
Blue	Non-points classification
Blue	Non-classified finish (NC)
Purple	Retired, not classified (Ret)
Red	Did not qualify (DNQ)
Red	Did not pre-qualify (DNPQ)
Black	Disqualified (DSQ)
White	Did not start (DNS)
White	Withdrew (WD)
White	Race cancelled (C)
Blank	Did not practice (DNP)
Blank	Did not arrive (DNA)
Blank	Excluded (EX)

**Bold** – Pole
Italics – Fastest Lap

=== Manufacturers' Trophy ===
Manufactures' Points system
**1st**	**2nd**	**3rd**	**4th**	**5th**	**6th**	**7th**	**8th**	**9th**	**10th**
12	10	8	7	6	5	4	3	2	1

Pos	Manufacturer	JAR (Spain)		ALB (Spain)		BAR (Spain)		EST (Portugal)		CAL (Spain)		JER (Spain)		JAR (Spain)		BAR (Spain)		Points
1	(Germany) Audi	1	2	1	1	1	2	1	3	2	2	6	5	2	5	2	2	260
1	(Germany) Audi	2	3	9	9	5	4	3	4	8	3	7	6	7	Ret	4	5	260
2	(Japan) Nissan	5	1	2	2	3	6	5	5	1	1	3	2	6	7	6	1	222
2	(Japan) Nissan	8	DNS	4	4	4	Ret	9	7	4	8	5	3	Ret	8	7	4	222
3	(Germany) Opel	4	5	3	3	7	3	4	2	5	5	4	4	4	3	5	Ret	177
3	(Germany) Opel	6	6	Ret	8	9	5	10	6	6	DSQ	DNS	Ret	8	9	Ret	Ret	177
4	(Germany) BMW	3	4	5	10	10	9	2	1	13	4	1	9	1	1	3	3	163
4	(Germany) BMW	11	10	Ret	11	12	10	5	8	Ret	11	11	Ret	11	12	11	11	163
Manufacture ineligible to score points
	(Italy) Alfa Romeo					2	1			3	6	2	1	9	6	1	Ret	
	(Italy) Alfa Romeo					6	Ret			7	Ref	8	Ret	10	10	14	8	

Colour	Result
Gold	Winner
Silver	Second place
Bronze	Third place
Green	Points classification
Blue	Non-points classification
Blue	Non-classified finish (NC)
Purple	Retired, not classified (Ret)
Red	Did not qualify (DNQ)
Red	Did not pre-qualify (DNPQ)
Black	Disqualified (DSQ)
White	Did not start (DNS)
White	Withdrew (WD)
White	Race cancelled (C)
Blank	Did not practice (DNP)
Blank	Did not arrive (DNA)
Blank	Excluded (EX)
