= Giampiero Simoni =

Italian racing driver (born 1969)

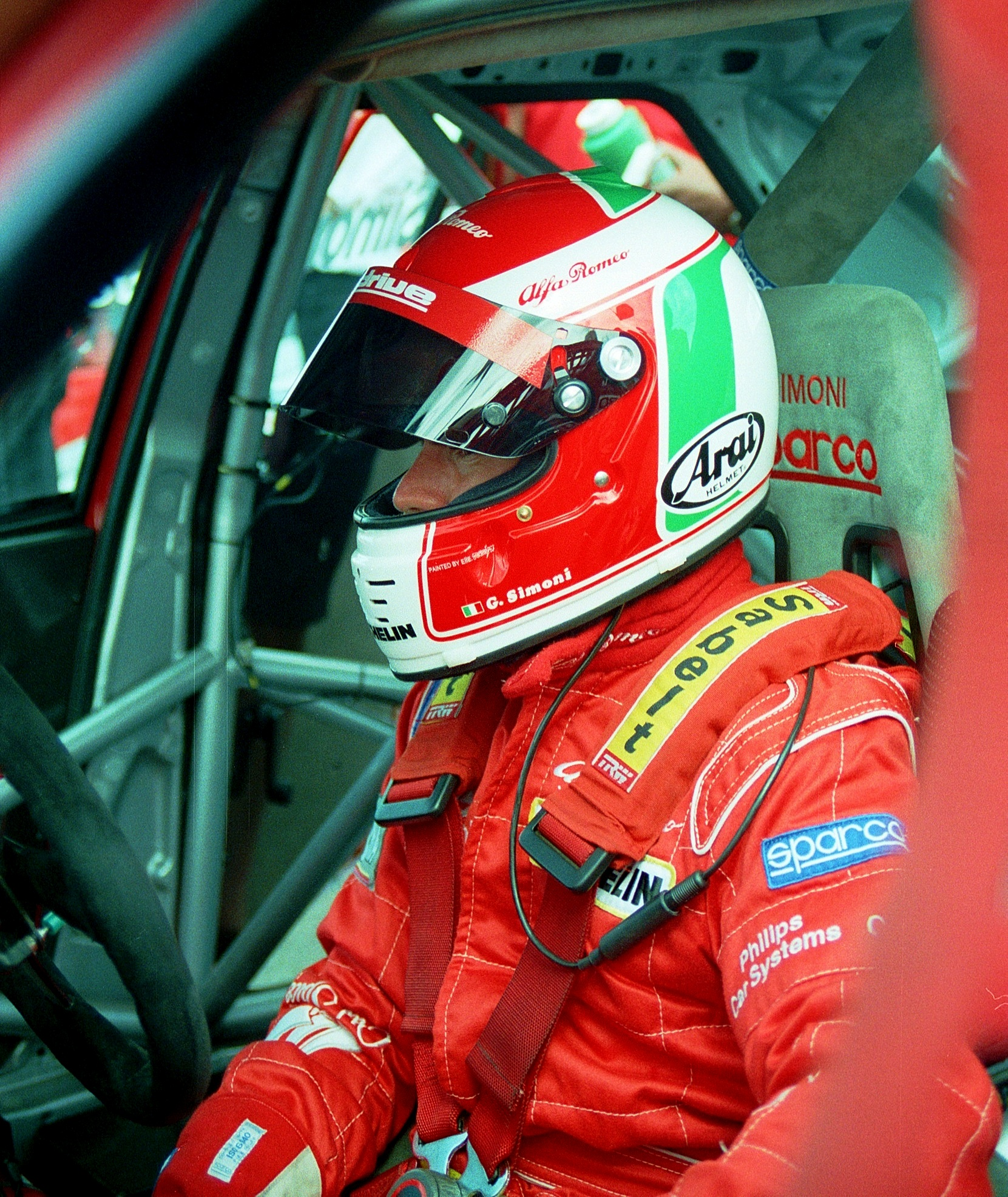
- Simoni in 1995
- Nationality: (Italy) Italian
- Born: 12 September 1969 (age 57) Porto San Giorgio, Italy

British Touring Car Championship
- Years active: 1994–1995
- Teams: Alfa Corse; Alfa Romeo Old Spice Racing
- Starts: 33
- Wins: 1
- Poles: 2
- Fastest laps: 1
- Best finish: 5th in 1994

Giampiero Simoni (born 12 September 1969 in Porto San Giorgio) is an Italian former racing driver who made his name in Touring Car racing.

== Racing career ==
Simoni's racing career started in karting, becoming world kart champion in 1987. In 1990, he entered the Italian Formula Three Championship. After driving for two years in Formula 3000 (1992–93), he spent two years in the British Touring Car Championship (1994–95), driving for the Alfa Romeo works team in an Alfa Romeo 155. In his first year, he finished fifth in the championship in a dominant team alongside eventual champion Gabriele Tarquini, winning one race in the season. In 1995, the car no longer had the aerodynamic advantage over other teams and he finished a lowly 17th after only driving a part season. 1995 was also spent driving selected races in the DTM. Afterwards, 1996 saw him race in the All Japan GT Championship in a GT500 Toyota Supra. Thereafter his racing activities were sporadic, including a couple of appearances in the 1997 Belgian Procar Championship.

== Racing record ==
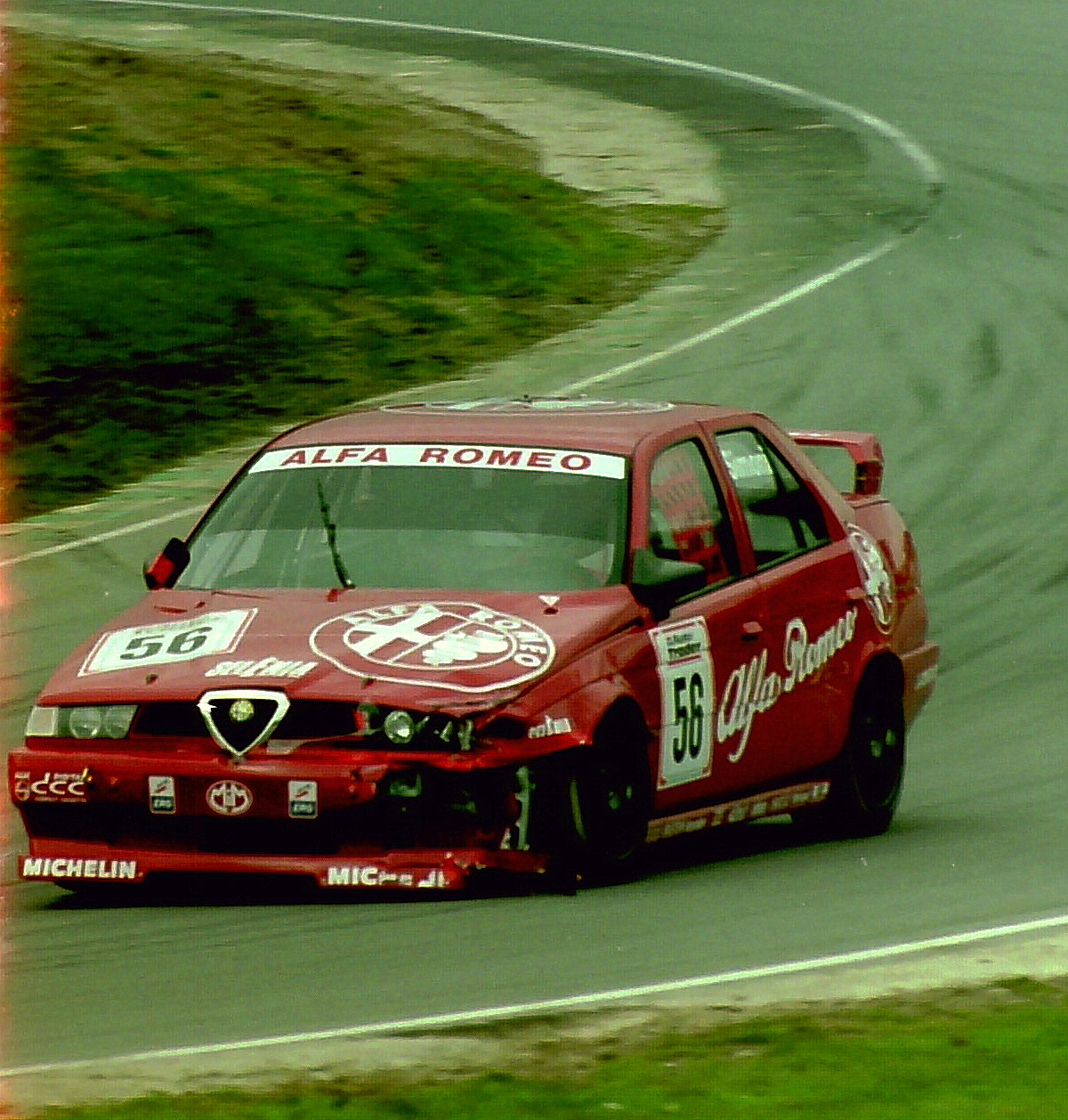
Simoni driving for Alfa Romeo at Brands Hatch during the 1994 British Touring Car Championship season.

=== Complete British Touring Car Championship results ===
(key) (Races in bold indicate pole position) (Races in italics indicate fastest lap)

Year	Team	Car	1	2	3	4	5	6	7	8	9	10	11	12	13	14	15	16	17	18	19	20	21	22	23	24	25	Pos	Pts
1994	Alfa Corse	Alfa Romeo 155 TS	THR; 11	BRH; 1; 2	BRH; 2 DSQ	**SNE**; 3	SIL; 1 Ret	SIL; 2 DNS	OUL; WD	DON; 1 Ret	DON; 2 DNS	**BRH**; **1**; 2	BRH; 2; 2	SIL; Ret	KNO; 1 Ret	KNO; 2; 9	OUL; 4	BRH; 1; 3	BRH; 2; 3	SIL; 1; 6	SIL; 2; 3	DON; 1; 3	DON; 2; 1					**5th**	**156**
1995	Alfa Romeo Old Spice Racing	Alfa Romeo 155 TS	DON; 1; 10	DON; 2; 9	BRH; 1; 10	BRH; 2; 12	THR; 1; 6	THR; 2; 10	SIL; 1 Ret	SIL; 2; 9	OUL; 1; 5	OUL; 2; 7	BRH; 1; 9	BRH; 2; 12	DON; 1 Ret	DON; 2 Ret	SIL; 11	KNO; 1	KNO; 2	BRH; 1	BRH; 2	SNE; 1	SNE; 2	OUL; 1	OUL; 2	SIL; 1	SIL; 2	**17th**	**27**

=== Complete Deutsche Tourenwagen Meisterschaft Results ===
(key) (Races in bold indicate pole position) (Races in italics indicate fastest lap)

Year	Team	Car	1	2	3	4	5	6	7	8	9	10	11	12	13	14	Pos.	Pts
1995	Alfa Corse 2	Alfa Romeo 155 V6 Ti	HOC; 1	HOC; 2	AVU; 1	AVU; 2	NOR; 1	NOR; 2	DIE; 1 Ret	DIE; 2 DNS	NÜR; 1	NÜR; 2	ALE; 1	ALE; 2	HOC; 1	HOC; 2	NC	0

=== Complete Spanish Touring Car Championship results ===
(key) (Races in bold indicate pole position; races in italics indicate fastest lap.)

Year	Team	Car	1	2	3	4	5	6	7	8	9	10	11	12	13	14	15	16	17	18	19	20	DC	Pts
1995	Alfa Corse	Alfa Romeo 155 TS	JER; 1	JER; 2	JAR; 1	JAR; 2	BAR; 1	BAR; 2	EST; 1	EST; 2	ALB; 1	ALB; 2	CAL; 1	CAL; 2	ALB; 1	ALB; 2	JER; 1; 5†	JER; 2; 3†	BAR; 1; 6†	BAR; 2; 6†	JAR; 1	JAR; 2	NC	0

† Not eligible for points.
