= Jordi Gené =

Spanish racing driver (born 1970)

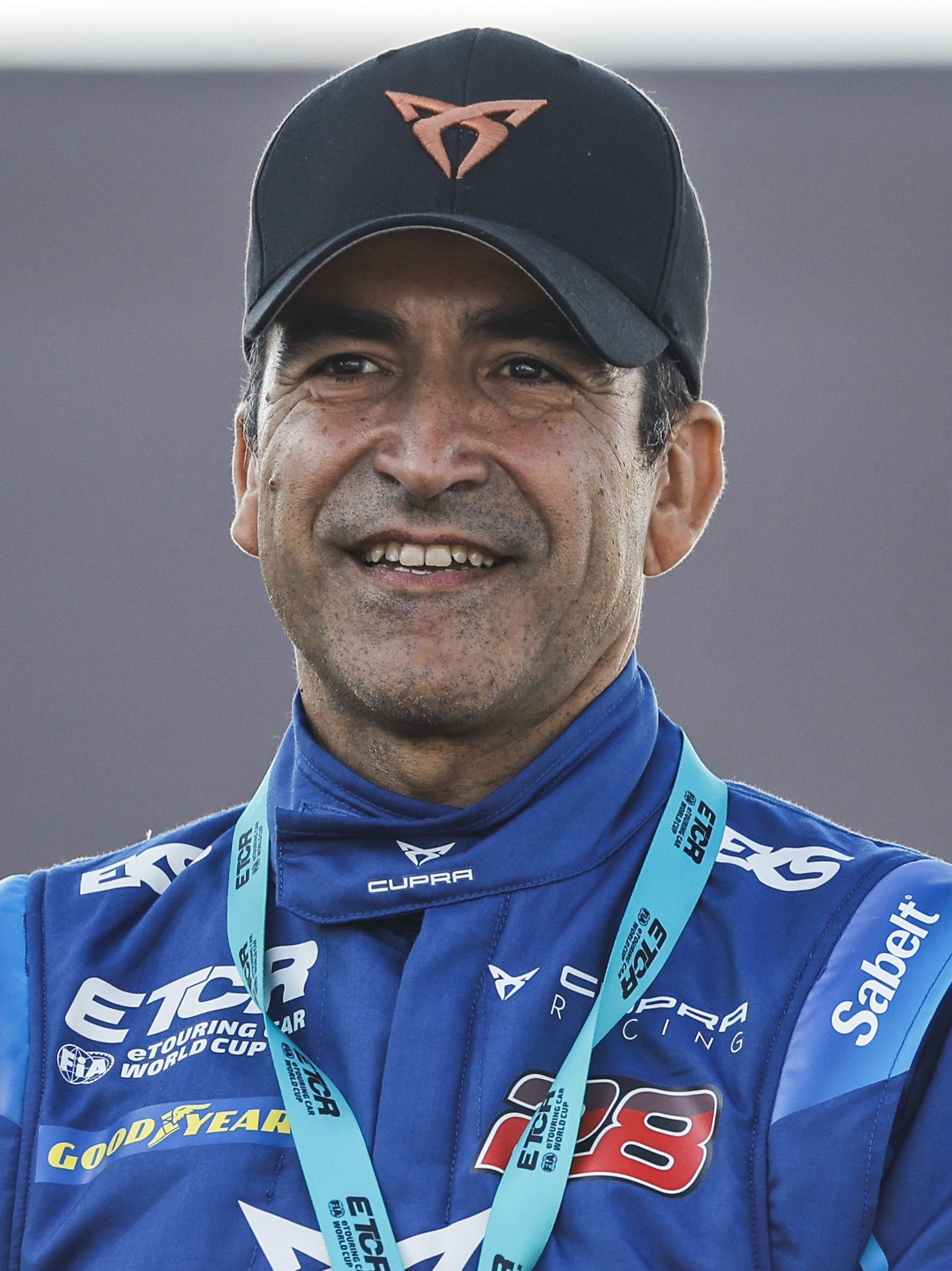
- Gené in 2022
- Nationality: (Spain) Spanish
- Born: 5 December 1970 (age 55) Sabadell, Spain
- Relatives: Marc Gené (brother); Eric Gené (son)

Previous series
- 2021-2022 2021 2015 2015 2012 2011 2011 2010 2010 2009 2008 2007 2007 2006 2005 2004 2004 2003 2002 2001 2001 2000 1996 1995 1994 1993 1992 1991 1990 1989 1988 1987: Pure ETCR; World Touring Car Cup; Audi Sport TT Cup; TCR International Series; STCC; Lada Granta Cup; International GT Open; International GT Open; WTCC; WTCC; WTCC; Spanish GT Championship; WTCC; WTCC; WTCC; TC2000; ETCC; ETCC; ETCC; European Le Mans Series; 24 Hours of Le Mans; 24 Hours of Le Mans; CET; CET; International Formula 3000; International Formula 3000; International Formula 3000; British F3; British F3; British Formula Ford Championship; Spanish Formula Ford; Fiat Uno Championship

Championship titles
- 2003 1996 1988 1987: Spanish GT Championship; CET; Spanish Formula Ford Championship; Fiat Uno Championship

24 Hours of Le Mans career
- Years: 2000–2002
- Teams: Racing Organisation Course (ROC)
- Best finish: 5th (2001)
- Class wins: 1 (2001)

Jordi Gené Guerrero (born 5 December 1970) is a racing driver who competed in the World Touring Car Championship between 2005 and 2010. His younger brother, Marc is also an ex-racing driver and is currently a brand ambassador for the Scuderia Ferrari Formula One team.

== Early career ==
After winning the Spanish Karting Championship in 1986, Sabadell-born Gené moved up to automobiles, where he became instantly competitive, winning the Fiat Uno Championship in 1987 and the Spanish Formula Ford Championship the following year.

In 1989, Gené emigrated to England, where he drove in the British Formula Ford Championship, also taking part in the Formula Ford Festival, where he took fourth place. Moving up to British Formula 3 Championship, Gené spent two years in the series, taking fourth place in 1991 with West Surrey Racing, driving a Ralt-Honda. Gené also attended the Marlboro Masters in Zandvoort, where he lost the international F3 meeting to David Coulthard, and took part in the traditional season-ender races in Asia, the Macau Grand Prix and Fuji Superprix, winning the latter.

== Formula 3000 and Formula One attempts ==
Thanks to a Marlboro sponsorship, Gené found a seat in Formula 3000 in 1992, partnering Laurent Aïello for Pacific Racing. Gené won the opening round at Silverstone and finished fifth in the Championship in his Reynard-Mugen.

The following year, Gené was involved in the Bravo F1 project, an attempt by former Spanish F1 driver Adrián Campos to create a Formula One team. However, the project was aborted upon the sudden death of team owner Jean Mosnier and the failure of the car to pass the mandatory crash tests, the Team did however turn up at 1993 South African Grand Prix. Gené repeated F3000, this time with TWR Jr., but failed to score a single point. However, the Walkinshaw connection led him to a test driver contract with the Benetton team in 1994, alongside his third year in F3000, now with Nordic Racing and a Lola chassis.

== Touring cars ==
=== Spanish Touring Car Championship ===
Failing to move up to Formula One, Gené returned to his native Spain and joined the Campeonato de España de Turismos. In 1995, he became an Opel works driver and drove an Opel Vectra to second place in the championship, but a switch to Audi the following year gave him the title after five wins.

=== European Touring Car Championship ===
This led to him joining Roberto Ravaglia's BMW Team Italy-Spain in 2002, driving a BMW 320i in the European Touring Car Championship and finishing eighth overall, but although the BMW was one of the two most competitive cars in the field, Gené left the team at the end of year to join SEAT's new attack on the ETCC, starting in 2003.

After a disappointing first season (17th place overall), Gené Spanish driver's (and the team's) fortunes improved in 2004, where Gené finished on the podium twice, taking the Toledo to eighth place overall in the series.

=== World Touring Car Championship ===
==== SEAT Sport (2005–2009) ====
In 2005, Gené raced for SEAT in the World Touring Car Championship, initially with the SEAT Toledo, and took a win towards the end of the season with the brand new SEAT León. He finished 11th in the championship.

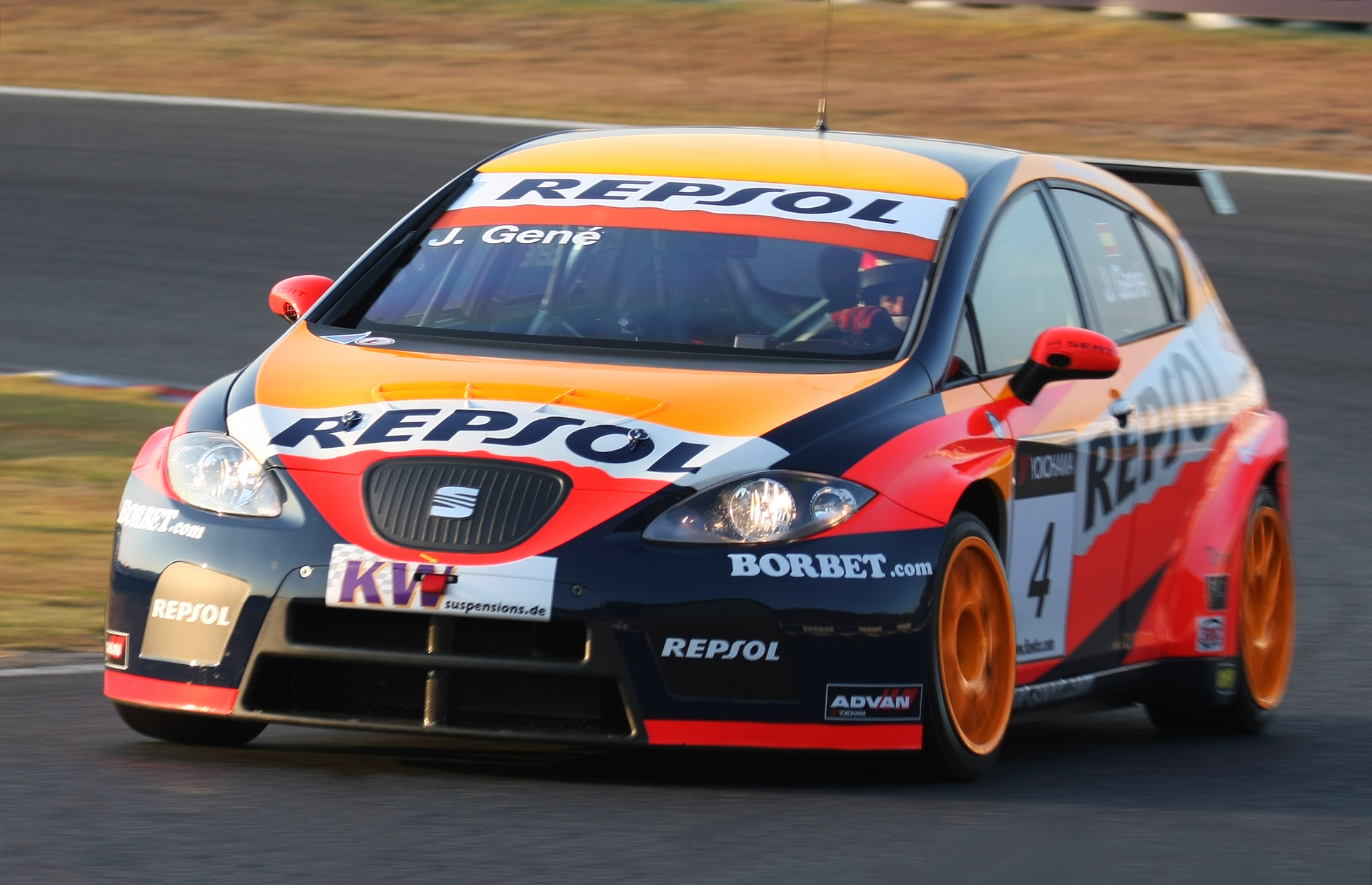
Gené driving a SEAT León TDI for SEAT Sport at the 2009 FIA WTCC Race of Japan.

Gené stayed at SEAT Sport in 2009 as part of an unchanged lineup at the team. He took two podium results from the season opening Race of Brazil in an event where SEAT filled both podiums. He briefly led race two of the Race of Mexico before being passed by multiple drivers and finishing seventh. Gené finished on the podium for race one of the inaugural Race of Morocco after passing teammate Yvan Muller on the last lap, he retired from the second race with electrical problems. The start line incident in race one of the Race of the Czech Republic saw Gené along with Andy Priaulx, Robert Huff and Nicola Larini taken out of the race by Augusto Farfus who had veered to the left approaching the first corner.

Gené along with teammate Muller failed to get through to the second part of qualifying for the Race of UK, he then had all his times disallowed because the engine speed sensor of his car's data logging system was disconnected and he dropped to the back of the grid as a result. He was involved in an incident at the first chicane in race one of the Race of Germany and he retired on the second lap. Gené dropped out of contention in race one of the Race of Italy on the opening lap. He triggered an accident when he hit Huff's Chevrolet Cruze under braking, Huff lost control and made contact with Rickard Rydell who then hit Gené and Farfus. He had to sacrifice his position in race two of the Race of Japan in order to benefit championship contender Tarquini. He finished off the season at the Race of Macau with a podium in race one and was eighth in the drivers' championship.

==== SR–Sport (2010) ====
Following the withdrawal of the works SEAT outfit at the end of 2009, in January 2010 it was confirmed that he would partner Gabriele Tarquini, Tiago Monteiro and Tom Coronel in the SEAT supported SR–Sport team, run by SUNRED Engineering. He was the best SEAT driver in qualifying by lining up second, he finished seventh in the first race and second in the second race. At the Race of Belgium, he passed teammate Gabriele Tarquini at the start of the first race but he was under investigation after it appeared he had been ahead of Tarquini at the rolling start. Gené went on to take the victory but was later disqualified for a technical infringement, handing Tarquini the win. He did not finish either of the races at the Race of Portugal due to punctures. He was caught out by a first lap crash in race one of the Race of the Czech Republic which also forced teammate Tom Coronel to retire while a number of other drivers continued with minor damage. He was replaced at the Race of Japan by SEAT León Eurocup racer Michaël Rossi. He did not return after that and he finished the season twelfth in the drivers' standings.

=== Scandinavian Touring Car Championship ===
Gené moved to the Scandinavian Touring Car Championship in 2012, driving a Volkswagen Scirocco for Volkswagen Team Biogas. His best result was a second place at Åre Östersund Airport, he finished seventh in the drivers' championship while teammate Johan Kristoffersson won the championship.

== Truck racing ==
Gené's career took a completely different path in 1998, when he accepted Manuel Santos Marcos' invitation to drive the Cepsa MAN in the European Truck Racing Cup. However, in spite of spending two years in truck racing, he achieved no notable results and went back to cars full-time in 2000.

== Sportscars ==
Gené entered the 24 Hours of Le Mans, racing in the LMP675 category in a Volkswagen-powered Reynard for Noel Del Bello's ROC team, and also took part in the Spanish GT Championship in a Porsche. In 2001, Gené remained with ROC and took the Reynard-VW to a class win at Le Mans, also climbing to fifth place overall. The team's Reynard-VW also took part in the European Le Mans Series, winning the 500km Most in the LMP675 class. At the end of the year, Gené returned to touring cars by taking part in the 24 Hours of Barcelona, where he drove the winning Volkswagen Golf.

Gené also co-drove the SEAT Toledo GT car in the Spanish GT, winning the title in 2003 with Gines Vivancos, but in 2004, the new SEAT Cupra GT was not so competitive.

== Racing record ==
=== Complete International Formula 3000 results ===
(key) (Races in bold indicate pole position) (Races in italics indicate fastest lap)

Year	Entrant	Chassis	Engine	1	2	3	4	5	6	7	8	9	10	DC	Points
1992	Pacific Racing	Reynard 92D	Mugen Honda	**SIL**; 1	PAU; Ret	CAT; 3	PER; Ret	HOC; 5	NÜR; 8	SPA; 2	ALB; Ret	NOG; 8	MAG; 10	5th	21
1993	Tom Walkinshaw Racing	Reynard 93D	Ford Cosworth	DON	SIL	PAU	PER; Ret	HOC; 8†	NÜR; 10	SPA; 12	MAG; Ret	NOG; Ret		NC	0
1994	Nordic Racing	Lola T94/50	Ford Cosworth	SIL; 9	PAU; 9	CAT; 4	PER	HOC	SPA	EST	MAG			12th	3

=== Complete Campeonato de España de Turismos ===
(key) (Races in bold indicate pole position) (Races in italics indicate fastest lap)

Year	Team	Car	1	2	3	4	5	6	7	8	9	10	11	12	13	14	15	16	17	18	19	20	Pos.	Pts
1995	Opel Team Espaňa	Opel Vectra GT	JER; 1; 2	JER; 2; 6	JAR; 1; 12	JAR; 2; 7	BAR; 1; 3	BAR; 2; 2	EST; 1; 3	EST; 2; 3	ALB; 1; 2	ALB; 2; 1	CAL; 1; 3	CAL; 2; 3	ALB; 1; 2	ALB; 2; 3	JER; 1; 5	JER; 2; 4	BAR; 1; 2	BAR; 2; 2	JAR; 1 Ret	JAR; 2; 7	2nd	210
1996	Audi Racing Team Espaňa	Audi A4 Quattro	JAR; 1; 1	JAR; 2; 2	ALB; 1; 1	ALB; 2; 1	BAR; 1; 1	BAR; 2; 4	EST; 1; 1	EST; 2; 4	CAL; 1; 2	CAL; 2; 2	JER; 1; 6	JER; 2; 5	JAR; 1; 2	JAR; 2 Ret	BAR; 1; 4	BAR; 2; 2					1st	213

=== 24 Hours of Le Mans results ===
Year	Team	Co-Drivers	Car	Class	Laps	Pos.	Class Pos.
2000	(France) Racing Organisation Course (ROC)	(France) Jean-Christophe Boullion (France) Jérôme Policand	Reynard 2KQ-LM	LMP675	72	DNF	DNF
2001	(France) ROC Auto	(Switzerland) Jean-Denis Délétraz (France) Pascal Fabre	Reynard 2KQ-LM	LMP675	284	5th	**1st**
2002	(France) ROC Auto	(United Kingdom) Mark Smithson (United Kingdom) Peter Owen	Reynard 2KQ-LM	LMP675	126	DNF	DNF

=== Complete European Touring Car Championship results ===
(key) (Races in bold indicate pole position) (Races in italics indicate fastest lap)

Year	Team	Car	1	2	3	4	5	6	7	8	9	10	11	12	13	14	15	16	17	18	19	20	DC	Pts
2002	Ravaglia Motorsport	BMW 320i	MAG; 1; 11	MAG; 2; 8	SIL; 1 Ret	SIL; 2 DNS	BRN; 1; 16	BRN; 2; 10	JAR; 1; 9	JAR; 2; 8	AND; 1; 5	AND; 2; 9	OSC; 1; 7	OSC; 2; 4	SPA; 1 Ret	SPA; 2; 4	PER; 1; 8	PER; 2; 10	DON; 1; 13	DON; 2; 3	EST; 1 Ret	EST; 2; 14†	8th	12
2003	SEAT Sport	SEAT Toledo Cupra	VAL; 1; 13	VAL; 2; 16†	MAG; 1; 9	MAG; 2; 6	PER; 1 Ret	PER; 2; 12†	BRN; 1; 9	BRN; 2; 8	DON; 1; 10	DON; 2; 12	SPA; 1; 13	SPA; 2; 11	AND; 1; 21	AND; 2; 13	OSC; 1; 10	OSC; 2; 14	EST; 1; 14	EST; 2; 14	MNZ; 1 NC	MNZ; 2; 10	17th	4
2004	SEAT Sport	SEAT Toledo Cupra	MNZ; 1; 9	MNZ; 2; 7	VAL; 1 Ret	VAL; 2; 11	MAG; 1; 7	MAG; 2 Ret	**HOC**; **1**; 3	HOC; 2; 4	BRN; 1; 22†	BRN; 2 Ret	DON; 1; 7	DON; 2 Ret	SPA; 1; 3	SPA; 2; 13	IMO; 1; 4	IMO; 2; 4	OSC; 1; 6	OSC; 2; 6	DUB; 1 Ret	DUB; 2 DNS	8th	39

=== Complete World Touring Car Championship results ===
(key) (Races in bold indicate pole position) (Races in italics indicate fastest lap)

Year	Team	Car	1	2	3	4	5	6	7	8	9	10	11	12	13	14	15	16	17	18	19	20	21	22	23	24	DC	Points
2005	SEAT Sport	SEAT Toledo Cupra	ITA; 1; 9	ITA; 2; 6	FRA; 1; 7	FRA; 2; 6	GBR; 1; 11	GBR; 2; 5	SMR; 1 Ret	SMR; 2; 13	MEX; 1 Ret	MEX; 2; 19†	BEL; 1; 12	BEL; 2 Ret													11th	33
2005	SEAT Sport	SEAT León													GER; 1; 7	GER; 2; 4	TUR; 1; 17	TUR; 2 Ret	**ESP**; **1**; 1	ESP; 2; 14	MAC; 1; 18	MAC; 2; 5					11th	33
2006	SEAT Sport	SEAT León	ITA; 1; 12	ITA; 2; 5	FRA; 1; 5	FRA; 2; 3	GBR; 1; 18	GBR; 2; 10	GER; 1; 16	GER; 2; 14	BRA; 1; 1	BRA; 2; 14	MEX; 1; 11	MEX; 2; 9	CZE; 1; 4	CZE; 2; 6	TUR; 1 Ret	TUR; 2; 5	ESP; 1; 16	ESP; 2 Ret	MAC; 1; 12	MAC; 2 Ret					10th	36
2007	SEAT Sport	SEAT León	BRA; 1; 9	BRA; 2; 12	NED; 1; 9	NED; 2; 10	ESP; 1; 4	ESP; 2; 6	FRA; 1; 8	**FRA**; **2**; 5	CZE; 1; 15	CZE; 2; 8	POR; 1; 14	POR; 2; 21†													10th	55
2007	SEAT Sport	SEAT León TDI													SWE; 1; 18	SWE; 2; 24	GER; 1; 6	GER; 2; 3	GBR; 1; 5	GBR; 2; 6	ITA; 1; 2	ITA; 2; 1	MAC; 1; 4	MAC; 2; 22†			10th	55
2008	SEAT Sport	SEAT León TDI	BRA; 1; 11	BRA; 2; 8	**MEX**; **1**; 1	MEX; 2; 5	ESP; 1; 3	ESP; 2; 6	FRA; 1; 3	FRA; 2; 19	CZE; 1; 13	CZE; 2; 14	POR; 1; 5	POR; 2; 9	GBR; 1; 9	GBR; 2 Ret	GER; 1; 5	GER; 2; 4	EUR; 1; 17	EUR; 2; 17	ITA; 1; 7	ITA; 2; 2	JPN; 1; 11	JPN; 2; 10	MAC; 1; 6	MAC; 2 Ret	8th	56
2009	SEAT Sport	SEAT León TDI	BRA; 1; 2	BRA; 2; 3	MEX; 1; 7	MEX; 2; 7	MAR; 1; 3	MAR; 2 Ret	FRA; 1; 16	FRA; 2; 12	ESP; 1 Ret	ESP; 2; 11	CZE; 1 Ret	CZE; 2; 11	POR; 1; 6	POR; 2; 4	GBR; 1; 13	GBR; 2; 16	GER; 1 NC	GER; 2 Ret	ITA; 1 NC	ITA; 2; 5	JPN; 1; 6	JPN; 2; 9	MAC; 1; 3	MAC; 2; 6	8th	48
2010	SR-Sport	SEAT León TDI	BRA; 1; 7	BRA; 2; 2	MAR; 1; 13	MAR; 2; 8	ITA; 1; 16	ITA; 2; 6	BEL; 1 DSQ	BEL; 2 Ret	POR; 1 Ret	POR; 2; 18†	GBR; 1; 10	GBR; 2; 10	CZE; 1 Ret	CZE; 2; 13	GER; 1; 12	GER; 2; 10	ESP; 1; 4	ESP; 2; 5	JPN; 1	JPN; 2	MAC; 1	MAC; 2			12th	61

† — Did not finish the race, but was classified as he completed over 90% of the race distance.

=== Complete Scandinavian Touring Car Championship results ===
(key) (Races in bold indicate pole position) (Races in italics indicate fastest lap)

Year	Team	Car	1	2	3	4	5	6	7	8	9	10	11	12	13	14	15	16	DC	Points
2012	Volkswagen Team Biogas	Volkswagen Scirocco	MAN; 1; 4	MAN; 2; 6	KNU; 1; 6	KNU; 2; 7	STU; 1; 7	STU; 2; 6	MAN; 1; 7	MAN; 2; 7	ÖST; 1; 4	ÖST; 2; 2	JYL; 1; 6	**JYL**; **2**; 5	KNU; 1; 6	KNU; 2; 3	SOL; 1; 6	SOL; 2; 6	7th	147

=== Complete TCR International Series results ===
(key) (Races in bold indicate pole position) (Races in italics indicate fastest lap)

Year	Team	Car	1	2	3	4	5	6	7	8	9	10	11	12	13	14	15	16	17	18	19	20	21	22	DC	Points
2015	Team Craft-Bamboo Lukoil	SEAT León Cup Racer	SEP; 1; 7	**SEP**; **2**; 1	SHA; 1; 7	SHA; 2; 10	VAL; 1; 3	VAL; 2 Ret	ALG; 1; 2	ALG; 2; 3	MNZ; 1; 4	MNZ; 2; 2	SAL; 1; 4	SAL; 2; 10	**SOC**; **1**; 1	SOC; 2; 5	RBR; 1; 4	RBR; 2; 3	MRN; 1; 6	MRN; 2; 1	CHA; 1; 2	CHA; 2; 4	MAC; 1; 2	MAC; 2 Ret	3rd	285
2016	Liqui Moly Team Engstler	Volkswagen Golf GTI TCR	BHR; 1	BHR; 2	EST; 1	EST; 2	SPA; 1	SPA; 2	IMO; 1; 6	**IMO**; **2**; 6	SAL; 1	SAL; 2	OSC; 1	OSC; 2	SOC; 1	SOC; 2	CHA; 1	CHA; 2	MRN; 1	MRN; 2	SEP; 1	SEP; 2	MAC; 1	MAC; 2	18th	16

=== Complete World Touring Car Cup results ===
(key) (Races in bold indicate pole position) (Races in italics indicate fastest lap)

Year	Team	Car	1	2	3	4	5	6	7	8	9	10	11	12	13	14	15	16	DC	Points
2021	Zengő Motorsport Drivers' Academy	CUPRA León Competición TCR	GER; 1; 18	GER; 2 Ret	POR; 1; 14	POR; 2; 15	ESP; 1; 14	ESP; 2 Ret	HUN; 1; 16	HUN; 2; 17	CZE; 1 WD	CZE; 2 WD	FRA; 1 Ret	FRA; 2; 18	ITA; 1; 20	ITA; 2; 17	RUS; 1; 15	RUS; 2; 12	19th	10
