= Bravo F1 =

Proposed Formula One team from Spain

- Base: Barcelona, Spain
- Founder(s): Jean-François Mosnier
- Noted staff: Adrián Campos; Nick Wirth

Formula One World Championship career
- Races entered: 0
- Engines: Judd
- Constructors' Championships: 0
- Drivers' Championships: 0
- Race victories: 0
- Podiums: 0
- Points: 0
- Pole positions: 0
- Fastest laps: 0

Bravo F1 was a Spanish motor racing team that registered for the 1993 Formula One season, but ultimately did not compete. It was the second Spanish project that hoped to join the F1 grid after Pegaso España, which intended to compete in the 1954 Spanish Grand Prix, but was unsuccessful as the car was never built.

Based in Barcelona, the team was directed by Jean-François Mosnier with Jaume Magrans i Perelló as chairman. The car, designated Bravo S931, was to be a model designed by Nick Wirth as an improved version of the Andrea Moda S921 and powered by Judd engines. Adrián Campos was also involved with developing the car. Candidates to drive were Nicola Larini, Ivan Árias, Jordi Gené and Damon Hill.

After the sudden death of Mosnier and having failed the crash test, Bravo canceled the entry before the first race of the season. In 2010, Campos returned to F1 with Hispania Racing.
