= Campeonato de España de Turismos =

Spanish motorsport series for touring cars

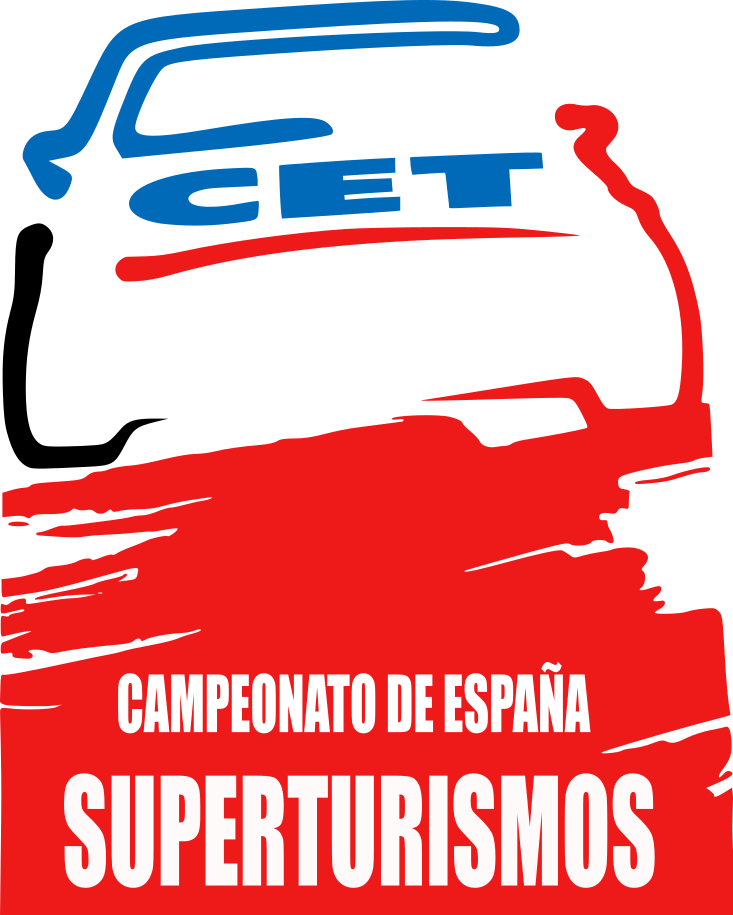
- Category: Touring cars
- Country: Spain
- Inaugural season: 1966
- Engine suppliers: Aston Martin; Mercedes-Benz; Porsche
- Tyre suppliers: Michelin

The Spanish Supertouring Championship (Campeonato de España de Turismos) is Spain's national motorsport series for touring cars. It was established in 1966 and its drivers' title has been held by such notable drivers as Double ETCC and champion Fabrizio Giovanardi, local idols Luis Villamil, Jordi Gene and formers F1 driver Luis Pérez-Sala and Adrian Campos.

== Champions ==
Series Name	Season	Champion	Team	Manufacturer Champion
Campeonato de España de Turismos	1991	(Spain) Luis Pérez-Sala (Alfa Romeo 75 America)	(Italy) Alfa by Nini Russo	Citroën
Campeonato de España de Turismos	1992	(Spain) Juan Ignacio Villacieros (BMW M3)	(Spain) Teo Martín Motorsport	BMW
Campeonato de España de Turismos	1993	(Spain) Luis Pérez-Sala (Nissan Skyline Gtr)	(Spain) Team Repsol Nissan	BMW
Campeonato de España de Superturismos	1994	(Spain) Adrián Campos (Alfa Romeo 155 Ts)	(Italy) Alfa by Nini Russo	BMW
Campeonato de España de Superturismos	1995	(Spain) Luis Villamil (Alfa Romeo 155 Ts)	(Italy) Alfa Corse	Alfa Romeo
Campeonato de España de Superturismos	1996	(Spain) Jordi Gené (Audi A4 quattro)	(Spain) Audi Racing Team España	Audi
Campeonato de España de Superturismos	1997	(Italy) Fabrizio Giovanardi (Alfa Romeo 155 Ts)	(Italy) Alfa Romeo Nordauto	Alfa Romeo
Campeonato de España de Turismos Series	1998	(Spain) Alfredo Mostajo (Citroën ZX 16V)	(Spain) Almosport Competición	none
Campeonato de España de Turismos	2019	(Spain) Borja García (Honda Civic Type R)	(Spain) Teo Martín Motorsport	Honda
Campeonato de España de Turismos	2021	(Spain) Félix Aparicio (Honda Civic Type R)	(Spain) Teo Martín Motorsport	none

== See also ==
- Spanish Touring Car Championship :: Overview
- Super Touring Register - Campeonato de España de Turismos (Results 1994-1997)
