= Adrián Campos =

Spanish racing driver (1960–2021)

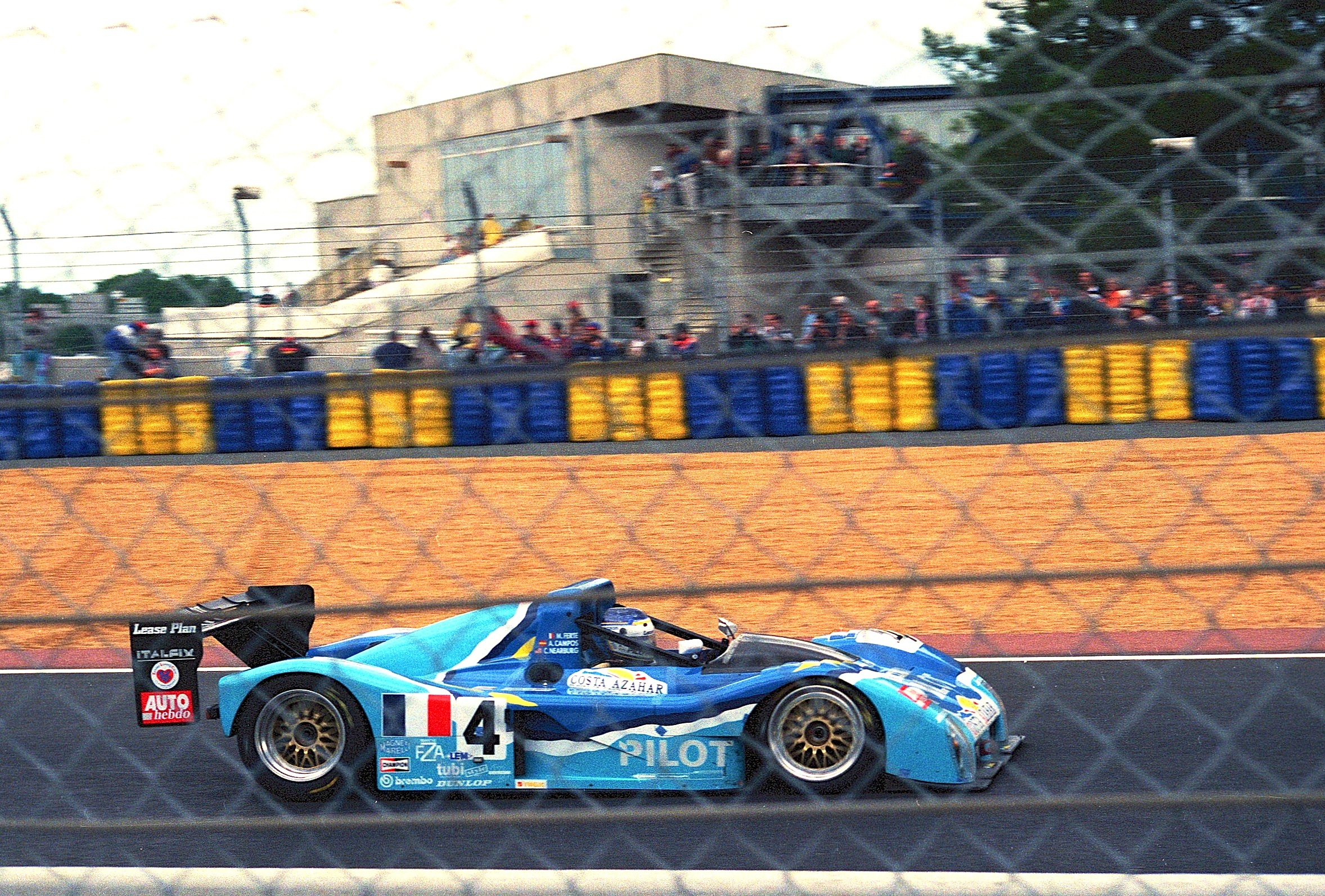
- Campos in 1997
- Born: Adrián Campos Suñer; 17 June 1960; Alzira, Valencia, Spain
- Died: 27 January 2021 (aged 60); Valencia, Spain
- Children: 3, including Adrián Jr.

Formula One World Championship career
- Nationality: (Spain) Spanish
- Active years: 1987 – 1988
- Team: Minardi
- Entries: 21 (17 starts)
- Championships: 0
- Wins: 0
- Podiums: 0
- Career points: 0
- Pole positions: 0
- Fastest laps: 0
- First entry: 1987 Brazilian Grand Prix
- Last entry: 1988 Canadian Grand Prix

24 Hours of Le Mans career
- Years: 1997
- Teams: Pilot Racing
- Best finish: DNF
- Class wins: 0

Adrián Campos Suñer (17 June 1960 – 27 January 2021) was a Spanish Formula One driver. He participated in 21 Grands Prix for Minardi between 1987 and 1988, without scoring a championship point. He later moved into team management, with more success. He was the founder of the Campos Meta Formula One team (later known as HRT), which competed in Formula One from 2010 to 2012. He founded Campos Racing in 1998.

== Racing career ==
=== Early years ===
Campos' first success was in radio-controlled car racing, winning the Spanish Championship in 1980. He switched to car racing a year later, and competed in Formula Three from 1983 to 1985, finishing 3rd in the 1985 German Championship. He raced in Formula 3000 in the 1986 season, with modest success.

=== Formula One ===
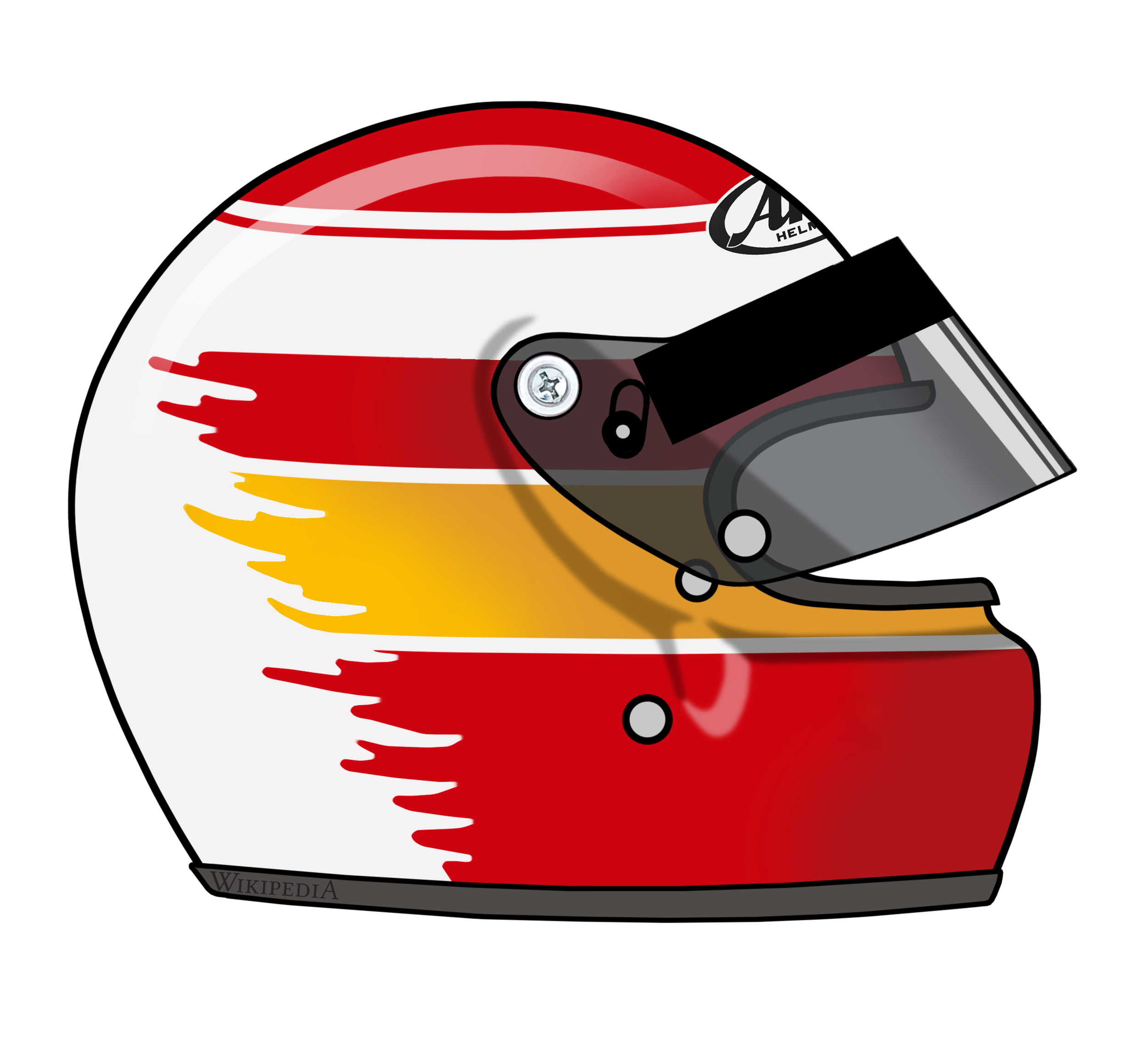
Campos' helmet, as raced by him at Minardi in 1987.

Having done some testing for Tyrrell in 1986, Campos raced in the 1987 and 1988 F1 seasons for the Minardi team, alongside first Alessandro Nannini and then compatriot Luis Pérez-Sala. He only completed two of the 21 races he entered, although more of these were due to mechanical failures than driver errors. However, these retirements caused him to lose his motivation and in 1988, he was replaced by Pierluigi Martini after failing to qualify in three consecutive races.

=== Touring cars and prototypes ===
Four years after his retirement from F1, Campos competed in Spanish Touring Cars, from 1992 until 1995 winning the championship in 1994.

1997 would be the last year Campos would spend as a professional driver. After some races in sports prototypes such as the Ferrari 333 SP, he would go on to form his own team as an owner.

== Team management ==
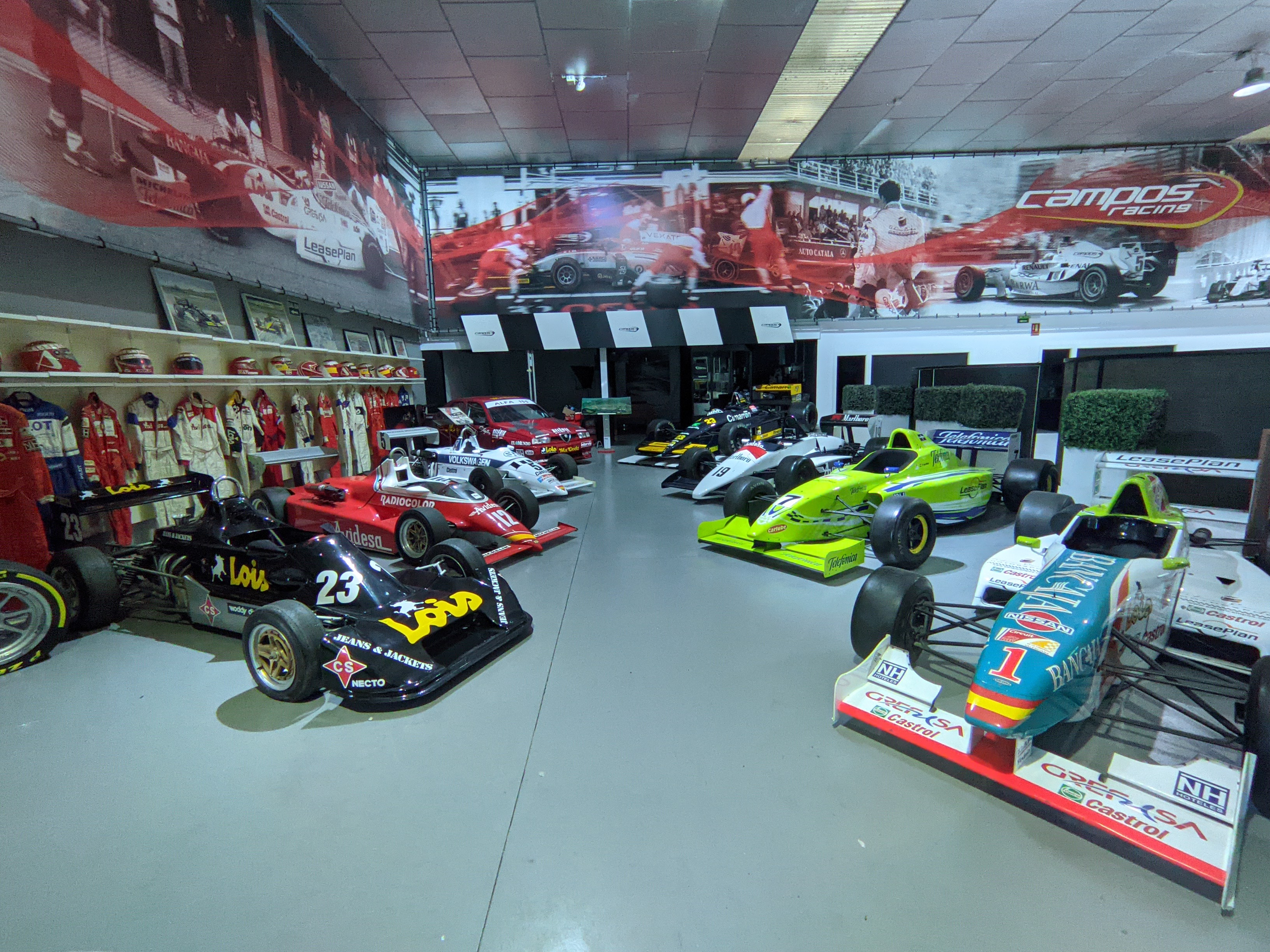
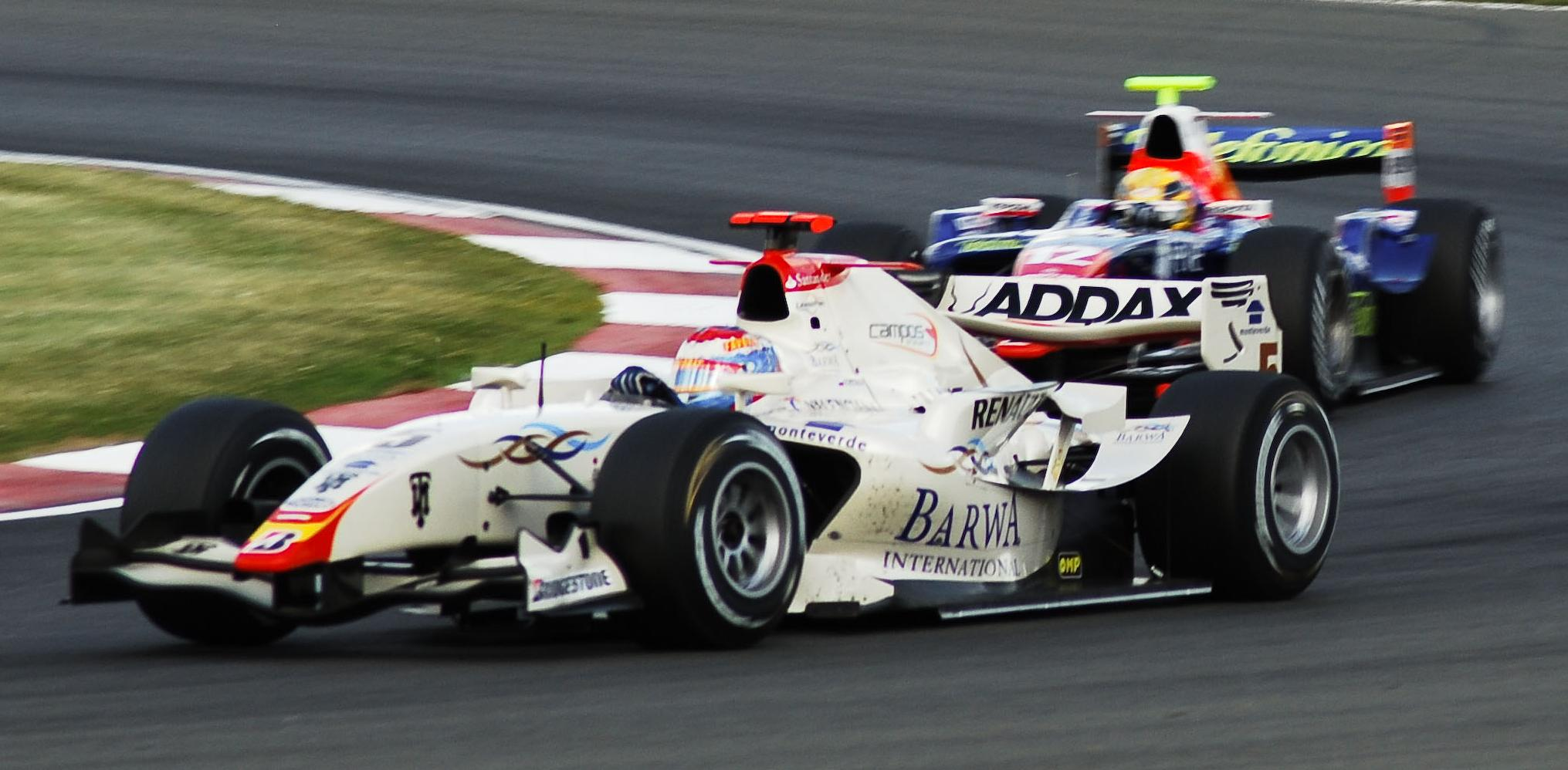
Campos founded Campos Racing in 1998. In 2008, the team won the GP2 Series.

After leaving Formula One, Campos became involved in team management. He founded Adrian Campos Motorsport (later renamed Campos Racing) in 1998, with Marc Gené winning the 1998 Euro Open by Nissan championship in the championship's first year before immediately reaching Formula One. He also managed Fernando Alonso in his early years.

Campos Racing entered the GP2 Series when it was launched for 2005. Two fifth places were the best results that year. The team opened 2006 with a podium at Valencia for Adrian Valles, but neither he nor fellow Spaniard Félix Porteiro scored another podium all year (Portiero was second on the road at Silverstone, but a steering rack irregularity caused him to be disqualified).

The signing of veteran Giorgio Pantano for 2007 led the team forward, with Pantano scoring two victories and 3rd overall, and teammate Vitaly Petrov winning at the season finale at Valencia. For 2008 Petrov remained, with Ben Hanley replaced in the second car by Lucas di Grassi after three rounds. Di Grassi immediately recaptured his 2007 form, with three second places in his first four starts, and subsequent wins at the Hungaroring and the new Valencia Street Circuit – which represented a double for the team, as Petrov won race one, having scored just one other podium all year. The Campos team won the 2008 Teams' Championship. In October 2008, Campos announced that he planned to step down from running the GP2 team and to sell his stake in it, but would still remain involved in F3 and a new project that was unspecified. The GP2 team was taken over by Alejandro Agag and renamed Barwa Addax.

=== Formula One ===
Campos had been linked to a move into Formula One. In 1992, he assisted Nick Wirth in developing a car for Bravo F1 but the team ultimately did not make the grid for the 1993 season. He also considered buying the assets of the defunct Super Aguri team. In May 2009, Campos Grand Prix lodged an entry for the 2010 Formula One season, which was one of four to be accepted. The entry was successful along with Lotus F1, Manor GP and US F1. The team, which was soon renamed to Campos Meta, confirmed on 30 October 2009 that Bruno Senna, who is Ayrton Senna's nephew, would be one of their drivers on the grid in 2010.

In February 2010, with the Campos team struggling financially, a rescue deal was completed whereby shareholder José Ramón Carabante took over full control of the team. As part of the restructuring, Campos was replaced as team principal by Colin Kolles. The team was renamed Hispania Racing (or HRT F1), with Campos taking the role of executive vice-president.

== Personal life ==
Campos' maternal grandfather Luis Suñer was a noted industrialist in Spain. His father founded the Avidesa frozen food company. He has a son whose name is also Adrián Campos Jr.

Campos died on 27 January 2021, aged 60, due to an aortic dissection.

Campos' home circuit of Circuit Ricardo Tormo named its final turn after Campos.

== Racing record ==
=== Complete International Formula 3000 results ===
(key) (Races in bold indicate pole position; races in italics indicate fastest lap.)

Year	Entrant	Chassis	Engine	1	2	3	4	5	6	7	8	9	10	11	12	Pos.	Pts
1985	Barron Racing	Tyrrell 012	Cosworth	SIL	THR	EST	NÜR; C	VLL	PAU	SPA	DIJ	PER	ÖST	ZAN	DON	NC	0
1986	Peter Gethin Racing	March 86B	Cosworth	SIL; 16	VLL; DNQ	PAU; Ret	SPA; DNQ	IMO; Ret	MUG; DNS	PER; DNQ	ÖST	BIR				NC	0
1986	Lola Motorsport	Lola T86/50	Cosworth										BUG; Ret	JAR; 7		NC	0

=== Complete Formula One results ===
(key)

Year	Entrant	Chassis	Engine	1	2	3	4	5	6	7	8	9	10	11	12	13	14	15	16	WDC	Points
1987	Minardi Team	Minardi M187	MM V6 (t/c)	BRA; DSQ	SMR; Ret	BEL; Ret	MON; DNS	DET; Ret	FRA; Ret	GBR; Ret	GER; Ret	HUN; Ret	AUT; Ret	ITA; Ret	POR; Ret	ESP; 14	MEX; Ret	JPN; Ret	AUS; Ret	NC	0
1988	Lois Minardi Team	Minardi M188	Cosworth V8	BRA; Ret	SMR; 16	MON; DNQ	MEX; DNQ	CAN; DNQ	DET	FRA	GBR	GER	HUN	BEL	ITA	POR	ESP	JPN	AUS	NC	0

=== Complete Spanish Touring Car Championship results ===
(key) (Races in bold indicate pole position; races in italics indicate fastest lap.)

Year	Team	Car	1	2	3	4	5	6	7	8	9	10	11	12	13	14	15	16	17	18	19	20	DC	pts
1993	Alfa Corse	Alfa Romeo 155 Q4	ALB; DNS	BAR; Ret	JER; 9	JAR; 10	BAR; 18	BAR; Ret	ALC; 5	ALB; 5	BAR; 3	JAR; 4	JER; 8										7th	47
1994	Alfa Corse	Alfa Romeo 155 TS	JAR; 2	ALB; 1	CAL; 4	ALB; Ret	BAR; 1	JER; Ret	BAR; 1	ALC; 2	JAR; 4	JER; 5											1st	132
1995	Alfa Corse	Alfa Romeo 155 TS	JER; 1; 6	JER; 2; 3	JAR; 1; 5	JAR; 2; 4	BAR; 1; 4	BAR; 2; 8	EST; 1 Ret	EST; 2; 4	ALB; 1; 5	ALB; 2; 4	CAL; 1; 7	CAL; 2; 8	ALB; 1; 1	ALB; 2; 1	JER; 1; 10	JER; 2; 8	BAR; 1 Ret	BAR; 2 Ret	JAR; 1; 7	JAR; 2; 9	7th	142

=== 24 Hours of Le Mans results ===
Year	Team	Co-Drivers	Car	Class	Laps	Pos.	Class Pos.
1997	(France) Pilot Racing	(France) Michel Ferté (United States) Charlie Nearburg	Ferrari 333 SP	LMP	18	DNF	DNF
