= Pedro Paz =

Portuguese footballer

Personal information
- Full name: Pedro Luís Carmo Neto de Paz
- Date of birth: 20 December 1994 (age 31)
- Place of birth: Moncarapacho, Portugal
- Position: Forward

Youth career
- 2003–2006: Moncarapachense
- 2006–2008: Ginásio Tavira
- 2008–2013: Olhanense

Senior career*
Years	Team	Apps	(Gls)
2013	Olhanense	3	(0)
2014–2015	Futsal		
2015–2016	Moncarapachense		
2016–2019	Futsal		
- * Club domestic league appearances and goals

Pedro Luís Carmo Neto de Paz (born 20 December 1994) is a Portuguese former footballer who played as a forward.

== Club career ==
Born in Moncarapacho, Olhão, Algarve, Paz joined local S.C. Olhanense's youth system in summer 2008, aged 13. He made his professional debut with the club on 9 January 2013, appearing against Moreirense F.C. in the group stage of the Taça da Liga. Four days later, again as a substitute, he first played in the Primeira Liga, featuring ten minutes in a 0–2 home loss to Sporting CP.
