= Circuit de Calafat =

- Full Circuit (1990–present)
- Location: L'Ametlla de Mar, Catalonia, Spain
- Coordinates: 40°56′2″N 0°50′30″E
- Opened: 29 September 1974; 51 years ago
- Architect: Jordi Xiol
- Website: https://circuitcalafat.com/

Full Circuit (1990–present)
- Length: 3.250 km (2.019 mi)
- Turns: 19

Original Circuit (1974–1989)
- Length: 2.496 km (1.551 mi)
- Turns: 14

The Circuit Calafat was built in 1974 outside the town of the same name in the L'Ametlla de Mar in Catalonia. Private finance paid by the company Calafat, S.A., which cost a total of 30 million pesetas (US$210,716.05). Fans made their own contribution, purchasing shares in the facility worth a total of 25,000 pesetas.

The track closed temporarily during 1982 and 1985 because of legal problems but soon recovered. In 1990 an extension to the circuit was constructed, bringing it up to its current 3.250 km (2.019 mi) length. On 2008 an investment plan to update the installations and security of the track started, thus in 2012 the circuit received the homologation from the Catalan Motorcycle federation.

In 2015 the circuit has been the destination for first tests of NextEV by TCR for the 2015/2016 Formula E Championship. Spanish driver Antonio García participated in the test.

In 2023 the circuit was used by David Beckmann to test Porsche Formula E Team's Porsche 99X Electric.

Original layout of Circuit de Calafat (1974–1989)
