= 2008 24 Hours of Nürburgring =

Endurance motor race in Germany

2008 ADAC 24 Hours of Nürburgring

Seasons
- ← 2007 2009 →

Nürburgring 24h track (Nordschleife+GP Circuit without Mercedes-Arena)

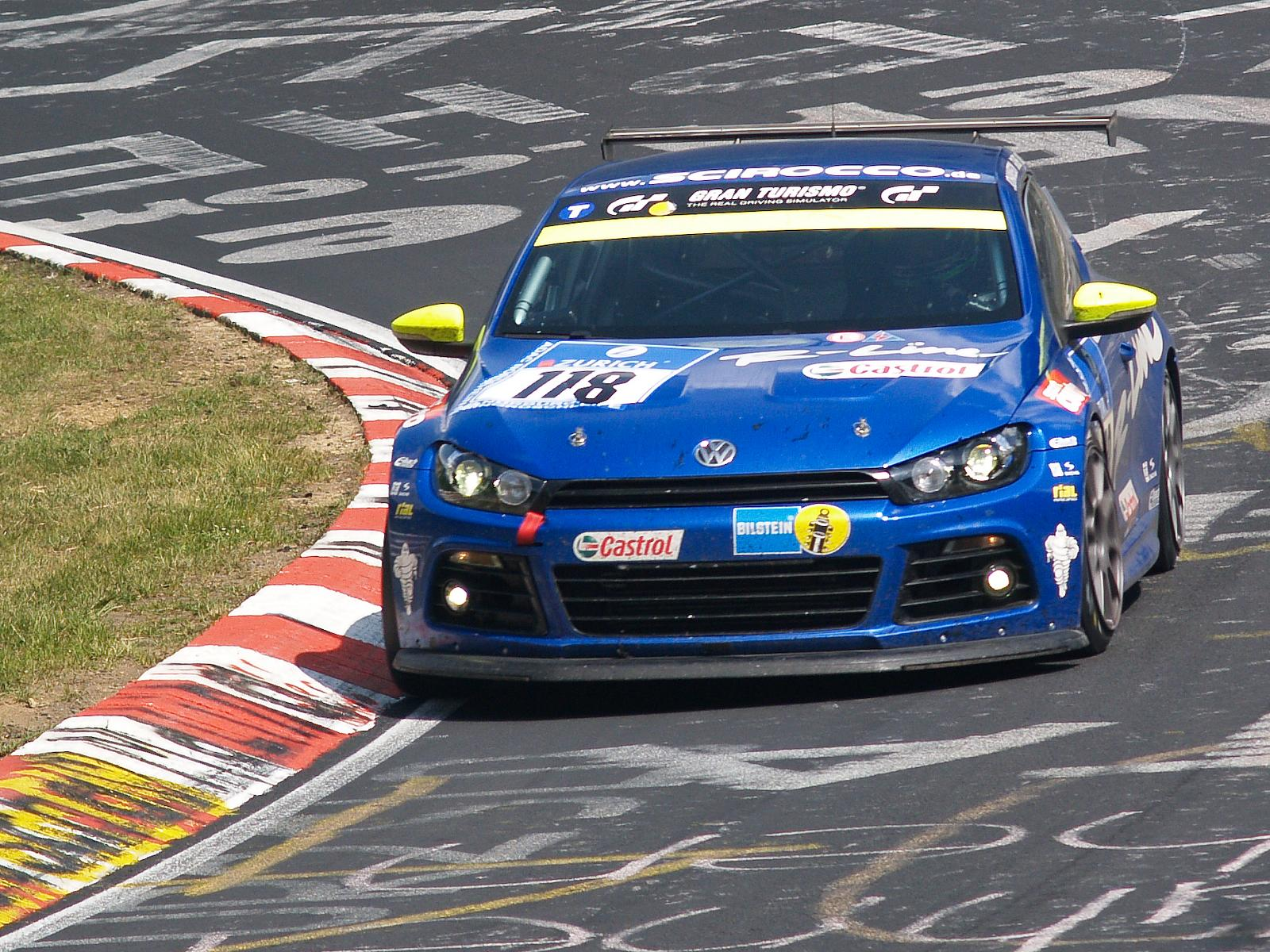
Volkswagen Scirocco at the 2008 24 Hours of Nürburgring

The 2008 ADAC-Zurich 24h-Rennen Nürburgring was the 36th running of the 24 Hours of Nürburgring. It took place on 25 May 2008.

The #1 Manthey Racing team won the race in a Porsche 911 GT3 R.

== Race results ==
Class winners in bold.

Pos	Class	No.	Team	Drivers	Vehicle	Laps
1	**SP7**	**1**	**(Germany) Manthey Racing**	**(Germany) Timo Bernhard (Germany) Marc Lieb (France) Romain Dumas (Germany) Marcel Tiemann**	**Porsche 911 GT3 RSR**	**148**
2	SP7	23	(Germany) Manthey Racing	(Germany) Pierre Kaffer (Germany) Armin Hahne (Germany) Christian Haarmann (Germany) Jochen Krumbach	Porsche 911 GT3-MR	147
3	SP7	121	(Germany) Sabine Schmitz	(Germany) Sabine Schmitz (Germany) Klaus Abbelen (Germany) Edgar Viersen (Germany) Kenneth Heyer	Porsche 997	145
4	**SP6**	**64**	(Germany) **ORMS Racing**	(Germany) **Marko Hartung** (Germany) **Stefan Neuberger** (Germany) **Franz Engstler**	**BMW Z4 M Coupe**	**144**
5	SP7	26	(Germany) Manthey Racing	(Germany) Frank Kräling (Germany) Marc Gindorf (Germany) Peter Scharmach (Austria) Martin Ragginger	Porsche 911 GT3 Cup	144
6	SP7	10	(Germany) Scuderia Augustusburg Brühl e.V. im ADAC	(Germany) Johannes Scheid (Germany) Oliver Kainz (Germany) Andreas Teichmann (Germany) Arno Klasen	BMW M3 E46 GTS	143
7	SP7	45	(Germany) AGON Motorsport	(Germany) Stefan Müller (Germany) Kai Riemer (Germany) Florian Scholze (Germany) Jörn Schmidt-Staade	Porsche 997 GT3 Cup	141
8	SP7	25	(Germany) Manthey Racing	(Germany) Lance David Arnold (Belgium) Jean-François Hemroulle (Belgium) Bert Lambrecht	Porsche 911 GT3	141
9	SP7	46	(Germany) AGON Motorsport	(Germany) Stefan Peters (Sweden) Ulf Karlsson (Germany) Hannes Plesse (Germany) Wolfgang Kohler	Porsche 997 GT3 Cup	140
10	SP7	33	(Germany) Land-Motorsport PZ Aschaffenburg	(Russia) Sergey Matveev (Ukraine) Valeriy Gorban (Russia) Stanislav Gryazin (Russia) Ergeny Tsarev	Porsche 997 GT3 Cup	139
11	**SP3T**	**118**	(Germany) **Volkswagen Motorsport**	(Sweden) **Jimmy Johansson** (Germany) **Florian Gruber** (Germany) **Thomas Mutsch** (Germany) **Hans-Joachim Stuck**	**Volkswagen Scirocco**	**138**
12	SP7	27	(Germany) Manthey Racing	(Germany) Gary Williams (United Kingdom) Daniel Cooke (United Kingdom) Julian Perry (United Kingdom) Trevor Reeves	Porsche 911 GT3 Cup	137
13	**S1**	**261**	(Germany) **Motorsport Arena Oschersleben**	(Germany) **Jörg Müller** (Brazil) **Augusto Farfus** (Sweden) **Fredrik Ekblom** (Norway) **Stian Sörlie**	**BMW 320d**	**137**
14	SP6	69		(Germany) Rudi Adams (Germany) Michael Funke (Germany) Arnd Meier (Germany) Markus Großmann	BMW Z4 M Coupe	137
15	SP3T	117	(Germany) Volkswagen Motorsport	(Spain) Carlos Sainz (South Africa) Giniel de Villiers (Germany) Dieter Depping (Germany) Hans-Joachim Stuck	Volkswagen Scirocco	136
16	SP3T	112	(Germany) SEAT Deutschland GmbH	(Germany) Thomas Marschall (Germany) Sebastian Stahl (Germany) Florian Gruber (Switzerland) Harald Jacksties	SEAT León Supercopa	135
17	SP7	47	(Germany) Ron Grüter	(Germany) Ron Grüter (Germany) Michael Budde (Germany) Klaus Werner (Germany) Frank Borkowsky	Porsche GT3	135
18	**SP8**	**8**		(Germany) **Oliver Mathai** (United Kingdom) **Matthew Marsh** (Japan) **Shinichi Katsura**	**Aston Martin V8 Vantage N24**	**135**
19	**SP3**	**143**		(Germany) **Andreas Mäder** (Germany) **Reinhold Renger** (Germany) **Reiner Schönauer** (Germany) **Roland Rehfeld**	**Honda S2000**	**135**
20	SP7	30		(Germany) Stefan Kohlstrung (Germany) Nicolai Wahl (Germany) Winfried Bär (Germany) Klaus Elm	Porsche 997 GT3 Cup	135
21	SP6	54		(Germany) Andre Krumbach (Germany) Holger Fuchs (Switzerland) Matteo Cassina (Switzerland) Ivan Jacoma	Porsche 996 GT3 Cup	135
22	S1	262	(Germany) Motorsport Arena Oschersleben	(Norway) Nils Tronrud (Norway) Anders Burchardt (United States) Michael Auriemma (United States) John Mayes	BMW 320d	134
23	SP7	85	(Japan) Falken Motorsports	(United Kingdom) Peter Dumbreck (Belgium) Dirk Schoysman (Japan) Tetsuya Tanaka (Japan) Kazuki Hoshino	Nissan 350Z Z33	134
24	**V6**	**224**	(Germany) **Sartorius Team Black Falcon**	(Germany) **Bona Ventura** (Germany) **Dieter Lehner** (Germany) **Jürgen Stumpf** (Germany) **Christer Jöns**	**BMW M3 E46**	**134**
25	V6	220		(Germany) Michael Luther (Germany) Franz Brenauer (Germany) Joachim Kiesch (Germany) Daniel Zils	BMW M3	134
26	SP8	19		(Germany) Frank Döring (Germany) Mario Ketterer (Germany) Horst Philipp (Germany) Joachim Seeber	Aston Martin V8 Vantage	133
27	SP8	7		(Germany) Ulrich Bez (United Kingdom) Chris Porritt (United Kingdom) Richard Meaden (Germany) Wolfgang Schuhbauer	Aston Martin V8 Vantage N24	132
28	SP3T	146		(Germany) Mike Jäger (Germany) Heiko Hammel (Germany) Gerd-Michael Schumacher (Germany) Bernd Schneider	SEAT León Supercopa	132
29	SP3	127		(Germany) Markus Fugel (Germany) Steve Kirsch (Germany) Ruben Zeltner (Germany) Uwe Wächtler	Honda S2000	131
30	SP6	53	(Germany) MSC Rhön e.V. im AvD	(France) Pierre de Thoisy (France) Eric van de Vyver (France) Thierry Depoix	BMW M3	131
31	SP8	44		(Australia) Mal Rose (Australia) Tony Alford (Australia) Peter Leemhuis	Holden Commodore	131
32	SP3T	116	(Germany) Volkswagen Motorsport	(Germany) Ulrich Hackenberg (Germany) Bernd Ostmann (Germany) Altfrid Heger (Germany) Matthias Malmedie	Volkswagen Scirocco	130
33	**V5**	**207**		(Germany) **Timo Schupp** (Germany) **Werner Gusenbauer** (Germany) **Andreas Herwerth** (Germany) **Ralf Schall**	**BMW M3 E46**	**130**
34	SP7	38	(Germany) Sartorius Team Black Falcon	(Netherlands) Dillon Koster (United Kingdom) Sean Paul Breslin (Italy) Diego Romanini (Germany) Jan Sloten	BMW M3 E92	129
35	**SP4**	**142**		(Germany) **Andreas Mäder** (Germany) **Eugen Sing** (Germany) **Friedhelm Mihm** (Germany) **Jürgen Bäumler**	**Honda S2000**	**129**
36	S1	272	(Germany) GRC Racing	(United Kingdom) Jacob Thomsen (Denmark) Jan Kalmar (Norway) Stewart Lauersen (Germany) Matthias Hoffsümmer	BMW 120d	128
37	**SP Cup**	**230**	(Germany) **Fuchs Personal Team Nett**	(Germany) **Christoph Dupré** (Germany) **Claus Dupré** (Germany) **Jürgen Nett** (Germany) **Rolf Schütz**	**Honda Civic Type R**	**128**
38	V5	210	(Germany) Schirra Motoring	(Germany) Peter Enders (Germany) Henry Walkenhorst (Germany) Markus Oestreich (Germany) Rolf Enders	BMW Z4	128
39	V5	214	(Germany) Sartorius Team Black Falcon	(Germany) Heiko Heinemann (Germany) Martin Elzer (United Kingdom) Ralf Willems	BMW 392 C	128
40	SP3T	102		(United Kingdom) Mike Rimmer (United Kingdom) Chris Rimmer (United Kingdom) Nick Barrow	Subaru Impreza	128
41	SP Cup	232	(Germany) Fleper Motorsport	(Germany) Peter Venn (Germany) Marcel Hoppe (Germany) Harald Thönnes (Germany) Herbert von Danwitz	Honda Civic Type R	127
42	SP5	75		(Germany) Rudi Speich (Germany) Roland Waschkau (Germany) Klaus Hormes	Audi A3	127
43	SP3	125		(Germany) Cyril Kalbassi (Germany) Olaf Bendixen (Germany) Fabian Ottmann	Honda Civic Type R	127
44	SP7	49	(Sweden) Porsche Center Boras	(Sweden) Christer Pernvall (Sweden) Claés Lund (Sweden) Göran Strandberg (Sweden) Hans Andreasson	Porsche 996 GT3 Cup	127
45	SP Cup	225	(Germany) Pink Power Taunus Racing	(Germany) Heinrich Ludger (Germany) Jürgen Schulten (Germany) Helmut Engelbracht (Germany) Dominic Scheib	Honda Civic Type R	126
46	SP3T	100	(Germany) AC Mayen e.V.	(Germany) Ralf Krause (Germany) Sebastian Stahl (Germany) Thomas Kroll (Germany) Timo Frings	SEAT León	126
47	SP3	114	(Germany) Kissling Motorsport	(Germany) Olaf Beckmann (Germany) Volker Strycek (Germany) Peter Hass	Opel Manta	126
48	**V3-V4**	**204**	(Germany) **Sartorius Team Black Falcon**	(Germany) **Alexander Böhm** (Germany) **Matthias Unger** (Germany) **Marian Winz** (Germany) **Michael Rebhan**	**BMW 325i E 90**	**126**
49	SP7	28	(Germany) Scuderia Offenbach	(Germany) Harald Weiland (Germany) Steffen Roth (Germany) Michael Klein (Luxembourg) Antoine Feidt	Porsche 997 GT3 Cup	126
50	**SP1-SP2**	**159**		(Germany) **Ralf Martin** (Germany) **Manuel Lauck** (Germany) **Matthias Luger** (Germany) **Elmar Jurek**	**Ford Fiesta**	**125**
51	V5	264	(Germany) Motorsport Arena Oschersleben	(Turkey) Emin Akata (Germany) Jürgen Dinstühler (Germany) Niclas Königsbauer (United States) Jimmy Locke	BMW 130i	125
52	SP7	87		(Germany) Rüdiger Klos (Germany) Michael Irmgratz (Germany) Ralf Wiesner (Slovakia) Miro Konôpka	Porsche 996 GT3 Cup	125
53	SP5	78		(Germany) Dieter Weidenbrück (Germany) Michael Holz (Germany) Uwe Erdtmann (Germany) Thomas Schumacher	BMW Z4	125
54	SP Cup	131	(Germany) Mathol Racing	(Germany) Oliver Lembeck (Germany) Christian Kosbu (Switzerland) Mario Meier (Germany) Norbert Bermes	Honda Civic Type R	124
55	SP7	39	(New Zealand) GT3 Endurance/Motorsport Services	(New Zealand) Scott O'Donnell (New Zealand) Allan Dippie (New Zealand) Lindsay O'Donnell (New Zealand) Bruce Stewart	Porsche 996 GT3 Cup	124
56	SP7	42		(Germany) Georges Kuhn (Germany) Dietmar Schmid (Germany) Thomas Wasel (Germany) Dirk Gerhardy	Porsche 964 RS	124
57	V2	180		(Germany) Michael Jestädt (Germany) Herbert Stenger (Germany) Alexander Schula	BMW 318i	124
58	SP6	86	(Japan) Subaru NBR Challenge	(Japan) Toshihiro Yoshida (Japan) Hideshi Matsuda (Japan) Naoki Hattori (Japan) Kouji Matsuda	Subaru Impreza	124
59	S1	256	(Germany) Oettinger Sport RSR	(Germany) Eberhard Rattunde (New Zealand) Wayne Moore (New Zealand) Maurice O'Reilly (Germany) Klaus Weigner	Volkswagen Golf 5 R-TDi	123
60	S2	268	(Germany) Renngemeinschaft Bergisch Gladbach	(Germany) Thomas Haider (Germany) Rainer Kutsch (Germany) Marc Hiltscher (Germany) Jutta Kleinschmidt	BMW 330d	123
61	SP3T	119	(Germany) Raeder Motorsport	(Germany) Elmar Deegener (Germany) Jürgen Wohlfahrt (Germany) Christoph Breuer (Germany) Martin Gass	Audi A3	123
62	V5	216		(Germany) Stefan Widensohler (Germany) Nils Reimer (Germany) Anette Stringos (Germany) Reinhold Renger	BMW M3	123
63	V5	213		(Germany) Dominik Thiemann (Sweden) Allan Runnegard (Germany) Cemal Osman (United Kingdom) Jody Halse	BMW M3 E36	122
64	SP5	84		(Germany) Hans-Rolf Salzer (Germany) Sascha Salzer (Germany) Tjark Schäfer	BMW M3 E36	122
65	SP1-SP2	152	(Germany) König Komfort u. Rennsitze GmbH	(Germany) Günter Kühlewein (Germany) Jörg Dörre (Germany) Horst Lars Müller	Honda Civic	122
66	SP1-SP2	161		(Ukraine) Andrii Kruglyk (Ukraine) Alexgi Mochanov (Ukraine) Oleksander Salik (Ukraine) Volodymyr Kondratenko	Ford Fiesta	121
67	V2	178		(Germany) Guido Wegner (Germany) Winfried Bernartz (Germany) Markus Schmickler (Germany) Guido Strohe	BMW 318ti	121
68	SP3T	104		(Australia) Ric Shaw (Australia) Stephen Borness (Australia) Phil Alexander	Mazda RX-7	121
69	S1	270	(United Kingdom) Marcos Racing International	(United Kingdom) Ian James (United Kingdom) Daniel Dror (United States) John Macaluso (El Salvador) Toto Lassally	BMW 120d	120
70	V2	181		(Germany) Günter Memminger (Germany) Stefan Memminger (Germany) Christoph Unterhuber	BMW 318i S	120
71	SP6	48	(United Kingdom) Geoff Steel Racing	(United Kingdom) Tim Christmas (Australia) Denis Cribbin (United States) Paul Jenkins (United Kingdom) Chris Wilson	BMW M3	120
72	V5	212		(Germany) Uwe Krumscheid (Germany) Stefan Manheller (Germany) Jürgen Lenarz (United Kingdom) Terry Sayles	BMW M3	120
73	SP5	76		(Germany) Frank Nöhring (Germany) Ingo Tepel (United Kingdom) Colin White	BMW M3 E46	119
74	SP5	67		(Germany) Simon Englerth (United Kingdom) Tom Robson (Germany) Kristian Vetter (Germany) Rolf Scheibner	BMW 130i	119
75	S1	267		(Germany) Armin Holz (Germany) Herwarth Wartenberg Jr. (Germany) Joachim Müller (Germany) Siegfried Steinacker	Volkswagen Golf IV TDI	118
76	V2	175	(Germany) MSC Wahlscheid e.V.	(Germany) Rolf Derscheid (Germany) Michael Flehmer (Germany) Werner Schlehecker (Germany) "Ilias de la Vina"	BMW 318i S E36	118
77	**SP4T**	**118**		(Germany) **Stephan Wölflick** (Germany) **Michael Klein** (Germany) **Urs Bressan** (Germany) **Jens Ludmann**	**Ford Mondeo**	**118**
78	**N1-N2**	**241**		(New Zealand) **Stu Owers** (New Zealand) **Michael Eden** (New Zealand) **Lewis Scott** (South Africa) **Mark Corbett**	**Honda Civic Type R**	**118**
79	SP1-SP2	160		(Germany) Benjamin Leuchter (Germany) Steffen Ramer (Germany) Harald Hennes (Germany) Swen Landgraf	Ford Fiesta	117
80	V3-V4	193		(Germany) Heinz-Willi Delzepich (Germany) Uwe Karp (Germany) Jörg Kosmalla (Germany) Dirk Heldmann	BMW E46	117
81	V2	182	(Germany) MSC Ruhr-Blitz Bochum	(Germany) Bernhard Christ (Germany) Michael Eichhorn (Belgium) Jan Heylen (Germany) Karsten Schreyer	BMW 318ti	117
82	SP4	93	(Germany) Fleper Motorsport	(Japan) Hisanao Kurata (Germany) Rhodri Hughes (Germany) Werner Uetrecht (Germany) Florian Fricke	Honda Civic	117
83	SP8	17		(Germany) Christian Kohlhaas (Germany) Dirk Riebensahm (United States) Vic Rice (Spain) Pedro Passyutu	Audi RS 4	117
84	SP3T	120	(Germany) MS Racing PZ Lörrach	(Germany) Hans Stukenbrock (Germany) Harald Böttner (Germany) Andreas Böttner (Germany) Manfred Siek	SEAT León Supercopa	117
85	SP3	113	(Germany) Kissling Motorsport	(Germany) Marco Wolf (Germany) Rainer Bastuck (Germany) Tom Nack (Germany) Wolfgang Haugg	Opel Astra GTC	117
86	SP3T	145		(Germany) Thomas Kroher (Germany) Philipp Leisen (Germany) Andreas Leufe (Germany) Stefan Küster	Audi TT	117
87	SP4T	88		(Germany) Björn Herrmann (Germany) Mike Martin (United Kingdom) Christian Bock (Germany) Christian Steffens	Ford Focus	117
88	SP Cup	229		(Germany) Michael Ecker (Germany) Kim Berwanger (Germany) Uwe Unteroberdörster (Germany) Patrick Lumma	Honda Civic Type R	116
89	S1	252	(Germany) H&R Spezialfedern	(Germany) Kai Jordan (Germany) Ralph Bohnhorst (Germany) Martin Zondler (Germany) Thomas Schiemann	Volkswagen Golf V Kit-Car	116
90	N1-N2	240		(New Zealand) Gregory Taylor (New Zealand) Brian McGovern (New Zealand) Alistair Taylor (United States) Timothy Martin	Honda Civic Type R	116
91	V3-V4	201	(Germany) Dolate Motorsport	(Germany) Nikolaus Wegeler (Germany) Frank Haack (Germany) Jürgen Meyer (Germany) Hans Holzer	BMW 325i E46	116
92	S1	254		(Germany) Bernd Kleeschulte (Germany) Paul-Martin Dose (Germany) Gustav Edelhoff (Germany) Roland Botor	BMW 320 E46	116
93	SP3	128	(Germany) Rheydter Club für Motorsport e.V.	(Germany) Marc Beckord (Germany) Alexander Roth (Germany) Christian Mass	Renault Clio	115
94	V2	177		(Germany) Peter Hoffmann (Germany) Reiner Bardenheuer (Germany) Markus Etz (Germany) Bernhard Christ	BMW 318is	115
95	SP3T	110	(Germany) Schirra Motoring	(Germany) Friedrich von Bohlen (Germany) Stephanie Halm (Austria) Harald Proczyk	BMW Mini Cooper S	115
96	S1	280	(Germany) pro handicap e.V.	(Germany) Wolfgang Müller (France) Oliver Rudolph	Opel Astra Caravan	115
97	SP3	140	(Germany) Partyschnaps.com	(Germany) Torsten Platz (Germany) Karl Pflanz (Luxembourg) Charles Kauffmann (Germany) Daniel Schwerfeld	Honda S2000	115
98	V5	215	(Germany) R-Line	(Germany) Martin Wagenstetter (Germany) Heinz-Werner Lenz (Germany) Mirco Schultis (Germany) Paul Hulverscheid	BMW M3	114
99	S1	122	(Germany) R-Line	(Germany) Thomas Klenke (Germany) Kai Jordan (Germany) Mario Merten (Germany) Peter Terting	Volkswagen Golf GTI	113
100	V5	196		(Germany) Marco Keller (Switzerland) Kurt Thiel (Germany) Uwe Seuser	BMW M3	113
101	V3-V4	191		(Brazil) Renato Milicki (Germany) Jochen Vollmer (Germany) Maic Hagenloch (Germany) Jörg Kirsten	Opel Astra GSI	112
102	SP1-SP2	150		(Germany) Daniel Sorg (Germany) Benjamin Sorg (Germany) Udo Schütt (Germany) Manfred Heuer	Ford Fiesta	112
103	V6	221		(Austria) Michael Prym (Germany) Victor Smolinski (Germany) Ralf Schnitzler (Germany) Helmut Walkolbinger	BMW M3 E46	111
104	**VD**	**174**		(Italy) **Gianni Bellandi** (Italy) **Alberto Bergamaschi** (Italy) **Paolo Cecchellero** (Italy) **Edo Varini**	**Kia Ceed**	**111**
105	SP4	94		(Germany) Ernst Sinowzik (Germany) Thorsten Stadler (Germany) Andre Krumbach (Germany) Sebastian Sauerbrei	Mercedes-Benz 190 Evo II	111
106	SP8	90	(Germany) Raeder Motorsport	(Germany) Hermann Tilke (Germany) Dirk Adorf (Germany) Marc Hennerici (Germany) Ralf Schall	Lamborghini Gallardo	111
107	V3-V4	194		(Germany) Stefan Hardtke (Germany) Roland Hardtke (Netherlands) Gerd Flentje	BMW 325i E36	111
108	V2	176		(Germany) Jörg Diekriede (United States) Matthew McFadden (Germany) Jochen Senft (Germany) Dietmar Henke	BMW 318is E30	111
109	SP3T	108		(Germany) Werner Gloyna (Germany) Sebastian Kamps (Germany) Eric Schomäcker (Germany) Sebastian Schneider	Opel Astra	110
110	SP6	80	(Germany) Live-Strip.com Racing	(Germany) Frank Jelinski (Germany) Rudi Seher (Germany) Karlheinz Grüner (Germany) Thomas Kappeler	BMW M3	110
111	SP5	81	(Germany) Live-Strip.com Racing	(Germany) Ulrich Neuser (Austria) Ronny Mai (Germany) Mola Adebisi (Germany) Kristian Nägele	BMW Compact	110
112	V5	209		(United Kingdom) Christer Hallgren (United Kingdom) Meyrick Cox (Denmark) Lasse Osterild (Germany) Eric Freichels	BMW M3	109
113	SP4	96		(Germany) Heinz Schmersal (Germany) Mike Stursberg (Germany) Christoph Koslowski (Germany) Stefan Schlesack	Honda S2000	109
114	SP5	79		(Sweden) Richard Sjösten (Sweden) Gunnar Dackevall (Germany) Michael Zehe (Germany) Gerhard Ludwig	Audi A3 Turbo	109
115	SP1-SP2	163		(Germany) Walter Kaufmann (Switzerland) Gregor Nick (Sweden) Hans Söderholm	Rover Mini Cooper	109
116	V3-V4	183		(Germany) Frank Hempel (Germany) Gunther Stecher (Germany) Hannes Pfledderer (Germany) Werner Gusenbauer	Mercedes-Benz 190E 2.5 16V	109
117	SP6	55	(Italy) Lanza Motorsport	(Italy) Giovanni Carotenuto (Italy) Ettore Bassi (Italy) Sergio Negroni (Italy) Daniele Bianchi	Nissan 350Z	108
118	SP1-SP2	158		(Germany) Hans-Georg Ströter (Germany) Manfred Anspann (Germany) Christoph Knour (Germany) Joachim Steidel	Ford Fiesta Cup	108
119	V2	195		(Germany) Sebastian Krell (Germany) Jörg Krell (Germany) Jörg Kurowski (Germany) Johann-Georg Riecker	BMW 318i S Coupé	107
120	V3-V4	202	(Germany) Team DMV e.V.	(United States) Bruce Trenery (United States) Scott Morton (Germany) Manfred Duske (Germany) Hans Keutmann	Honda Accord Type R	107
121	SP8	14	(Japan) Team LF-A	(Japan) Kazuo Shimizu (Japan) Akihiko Nakaya (Japan) Takayuki Kinoshita (Japan) Akira Iida	Lexus LFA	106
122	SP5	68		(Germany) Willi Friedrichs (Germany) Olaf Hoppelshäuser (Germany) Thomas Frank (Germany) Markus Giese	BMW 130i	106
123	SP1-SP2	149	(Germany) Scuderia Augustusburg Brühl	(Germany) Michael Nolte (Germany) Stefan Hübenthal (Germany) Peter Mölders	Ford Fiesta	105
124	N1-N2	237		(Norway) Ola Setsaas (Norway) Jörgen Pettersen (Norway) Mikjel Svae	Honda Civic R	105
125	SP1-SP2	156		(Australia) Layton Crambrook (Australia) Anthony Robson (Australia) Barrie Nesbitt (Australia) Mal Rose	Mitsubishi Mirage RS	104
126	V2	111		(Germany) Jürgen Glath (Germany) Bojan Ferk (Germany) Jürgen Fritzsche (Germany) Heinz-Otto Fritzsche	Opel Corsa C	104
127	SP3	126		(Germany) Stefan Schmelter (Germany) Andreas Telker (Germany) Peter Wichmann	Opel Astra G Caravan	103
128	SP Cup	227		(Germany) Frank Kuhlmann (Germany) Dino Drössiger (United States) Spencer Trenery (Germany) Bernd Erdmann	Honda Civic Type R	103
129	SP8	20	(Germany) Derichs Rennwagen e.V.	(United Kingdom) Keith Ahlers (Germany) Manfred Kubik (Germany) Helmut Undorf (Switzerland) Jörg Hügli	Audi V8 D11	103
130	SP3	130	(Germany) Mathol Racing	(Germany) Sven Kurtenbach (Germany) Mike Juul (Germany) Carsten Dreses (Germany) Achim Dürr	Honda Civic Type R	103
131	SP6	65		(Germany) Holger Eckhardt (Germany) Frank Eickholt (Denmark) Kurt Thiim (Germany) Nicole Lüttecke	Nissan 350Z	103
132	SP6	59		(United Kingdom) Guy Povey (United Kingdom) Jeff Wyatt (United Kingdom) Adrian Watt (United Kingdom) Alistair Davidson	BMW M3 E46	102
133	SP3	139	(Germany) Partyschnaps.com	(Germany) Martin Hörter (Germany) Patrick Wilwert (Germany) Walter Nawotka (Germany) Jörg Winterhagen	Honda S2000	102
134		255	(Germany) Deutscher Sportfahrerkreis e.V.	(Germany) Ralf Zansen (Germany) Lothar Wilms (United States) Christopher Peters	SEAT Ibiza	101
135	SP6	62		(France) Patrick Prieur (France) Fabrice Reicher (France) Pascal Engel	BMW Z3 M	101
136	S1	259	(Germany) DSK e.V. "Ja zum Motorsport"	(Germany) Michael Gerz (Germany) Patrick Rückert (Germany) Johannes Trimborn	SEAT Ibiza GT-TDI	100
137	SP1-SP2	154	(Luxembourg) GDMH-Motorsport	(Luxembourg) Christian Franck (Switzerland) Bob Kellen (Germany) Gerry Schanen (Luxembourg) Yann Munhowen	Ford Fiesta	100
138	SP7	99		(Australia) Andrew Taplin (Australia) Dean Grant (Australia) Peter Fitzgerald (New Zealand) Paul Kelly	Porsche 996	100
139	SP7	37	(Germany) Team RDM-Cargraphic-Racing	(Germany) Hans Graf (Germany) Peter König (Germany) Steffen Schlichenmeier (Germany) Fred Scheunemann	Porsche 911 GT3 Cup	99
140	N1-N2	234	(Germany) Team DMV e.V.	(Germany) Roman Schiemenz (Germany) Sebastian Minnich (Germany) Jürgen Heinrich	SEAT Ibiza	98
141	SP5	82		(France) Daniel Dupont (France) Alain Giavedoni (France) Jean Louis Juchault	Porsche 968 GPE	98
142	S2	277		(Germany) Heribert Steiner (Greece) Athanasios Karageorgos (Germany) Markus Seldmaier (Norway) Einar Thorsen	BMW 335d	95
143	S2	253	(Germany) TES Racing for Charity	(Germany) Geert Gabriels (Spain) Bruno Miguel (Belgium) Vic Herman (Belgium) Herwig Daenens	Toyota Auris	93
144	SP6	52		(Germany) Michael Tischner (Germany) Ulrich Becker (Germany) Klaus Völker (Germany) Klaus Koch	BMW M3 E46	92
145	SP1-SP2	167		(Germany) Christian Tschornia (Germany) Thomas Henkel (Germany) Guido Janzen (Germany) Michael Brüggenkamp	Suzuki Swift GTR	89
146	N1-N2	233	(Germany) Team DMV e.V.	(Germany) Hans-Christoph Schäfer (Germany) Marcus Bulgrin (Germany) Martin Mechtersheimer	SEAT Ibiza	86
147	SP Cup	231		(Germany) Arndt Hallmanns (Germany) Dino Moll (Germany) Michael Klotz (Germany) Stefan Michels	Honda Civic Type R	84
148	SP1-SP2	168	(Germany) LIQUI MOLY Team Engstler	(United Kingdom) Jethro Bovington (Germany) Guido Naumann (Czech Republic) Remo Friberg (United Kingdom) Nathan Freke	Fiat 500	84
149	V2	179		(Germany) Lutz Kögel (Germany) Axel Burghardt (Germany) Frank Löchte (United Kingdom) Ian Mitchell	BMW 318i S	83
150	SP8	6		(Czech Republic) Tomáš Enge (Germany) Stefan Mücke (Austria) Robert Lechner (Austria) Karl Wendlinger	Aston Martin DBRS9	81

== Started, result unknown ==
Pos	Class	No.	Team	Drivers	Vehicle	Laps
151	SP7	51		(Sweden) Anders Levin (Sweden) Martin Morin (Sweden) Carl Rydquist (Sweden) Peter Thelin	Porsche GT3 RS	127
152	SP1-SP2	155		(Australia) Malcolm Niall (Australia) Brett Niall (Australia) Clint Harvey (Australia) Mark Pilatti	Mitsubishi Mirage RS	115
153	SP5	83	(Germany) MSC Rhön e.V. im AvD	(France) Jean Baptiste Chretien (France) Arnaud Peyroles (Germany) René Wolff	BMW M3	114
154	SP7	22	(Germany) HISAQ Competition	(Germany) Frank Stippler (France) Emmanuel Collard (United Kingdom) Marino Franchitti (United Kingdom) Richard Westbrook	Porsche 997 GT3 RSR	109
155	SP3	137		(Germany) Matthias Behr (Germany) Theo Winkler (Germany) Harald Schlotter	BMW 320i	106
156	V5	206		(Australia) Richard Gartner (Australia) Ray Stubber (Australia) Paul Stubber	BMW M3 E46	104
157	SP7	24	(Germany) Wochenspiegel Team Manthey	(Germany) Georg Weiss (Germany) Peter-Paul Pietsch (United States) Michael Jacobs (Germany) Dieter Schornstein	Porsche 911 GT3	103
158	SP3	13		(Australia) Colin Osborne (United Kingdom) Stuart Jones (Australia) Simon Evans	Toyota Corolla	103
159	SP7	43		(Germany) Wolfgang Destree (Germany) Kersten Jodexnis (Germany) Marco Seefried (Germany) Marcel Leipert	Porsche 997 GT3	101
160	V3-V4	198		(United States) Mike Meyer (Germany) Roland Mühlbauer (Germany) Dieter Dick (United States) Jim Briody	BMW 325i E36	101
161	SP4	129		(Germany) Hans-Hatto Karl (Germany) Uwe Förster (Germany) Werner Bauer (United Kingdom) Ian Donaldson	BMW M3 E30	93
162	SP3T	144		(Germany) Dierk Möller Sonntag (Germany) Henning Klipp (Germany) Christian Gebhardt (Germany) Thorsten Unger	Audi TT	92
163	SP7	3	(Germany) Land-Motorsport PZ Aschaffenburg	(Germany) Marc Basseng (Austria) Johannes Stuck (Germany) Patrick Simon	Porsche GT3 RSR	91
164	SP7	9	(Germany) steam-racing GmbH	(Germany) Michael Schratz (Germany) Johannes Siegler (Germany) Jochen Herbst (Germany) Gregor Vogler	Porsche 997 GT3 RS	91
165	SP5	73	(Germany) Sartorius Team Black Falcon	(Switzerland) Laurentius Michielse (Netherlands) Erik Weijers (Netherlands) Ron Swart (Germany) Holger Zulauf	BMW 130i	90
166	SP3	124		(Norway) Hakon Schjaerin (Norway) Roger Sandberg (Germany) Peter Oberndorfer	Audi A4	89
167	SP7	31	(Germany) paragon AG	(Germany) Klaus Dieter Frers (Germany) Pierre Kaffer (Germany) Patrick Bernhardt (Germany) Jörg Hardt	Porsche 997 RSR	85
168	SP3T	105	(Germany) OPEL OPC RACE CAMP	(Germany) Christian Bach (Austria) Martin Karlhofer (Austria) Stefan Leitner (Switzerland) Kurt Wenger	Opel Astra GTC	76
169	V5	205	(Germany) MSC Rhön e.V. im AvD	(Germany) Christian Leitheuser (Switzerland) Benedikt Frei (Germany) Wolfgang Kudrass (Germany) Daniel Keilwitz	BMW M3	76
170	SP6	61		(Germany) Rainer Brückner (Germany) Roland Asch (Russia) Vitaly Dudin (Russia) Vadim Kharlov	Mercedes-Benz SLK Carlsson CK35 RS	75
171	V5	208	(Germany) Dürener Motorsport Club im ADAC e.V.	(Netherlands) Jaap Bartels (Germany) Christian Seewaldt (Germany) David Ackermann (Germany) Bernd Küpper	BMW M3	73
172	SP8	4	(Germany) Hankook / H&R Spezialfedern	(Germany) Jürgen Alzen (Germany) Markus Gedlich (Germany) Christian Abt (Germany) Christian Menzel	Porsche 911	71
173	SP Cup	132		(Switzerland) Sebastian Schäfer (Germany) Christian Eichner (Germany) Michael Imholz (Germany) Lothar Diederich	Honda Civic Type R	70
174	V5	203	(Germany) MSC Rhön e.V. im AvD	(Italy) Arturo Merzario (Italy) Luigi Scalini (Italy) Mauro Simoncini (Austria) Richard Purtscher	BMW M3	65
175	S2	276		(Germany) Henning Meyersrenken (Germany) Heribert Steiner (Germany) Reinhard Schall (Germany) Bernd Albrecht	BMW 335d	63
176	S1	265	S1	(Germany) Jörg Chmiela (Germany) Dietrich Hueck (Belgium) Olivier Muytjens (Germany) Zoran Radulovicz	Alfa Romeo GT	61
177	SP7	50	(Australia) Juniper Racing	(Australia) Shaun Juniper (Australia) Max Twigg (United States) Boris Said (Australia) Warren Luff	Porsche 997 RSR	59
178	S1	263	(Germany) Motorsport Arena Oschersleben	(Germany) Peter Posavac (Germany) Marc Bronzel (Germany) Alfred Backer (Germany) Andreas Winkler	BMW 120d	58
179	S1	257		(Netherlands) Iro Brenners (Netherlands) Ton Verkoelen (Netherlands) Henk Thijssen (Netherlands) Frank van Irsel	SEAT Leon Cupra R-TDI	56
180	S1	269		(Germany) Heiko Hahn (Germany) Tom Moran (Germany) Werner Riess (Germany) Frank Weischar	BMW 120d	56
181	SP7	35		(Germany) Martin Tschornia (Croatia) Franjo Kovac (Germany) Roland Asch (Germany) Sebastian Asch	Porsche 997 GT3 Cup	55
182	SP8	2		(Germany) Sascha Bert (France) Christophe Bouchut (Netherlands) Tom Coronel (Netherlands) Duncan Huisman	Dodge Viper GTSR	53
183	SP6	5	(Germany) Motorsport Arena Oschersleben	(Germany) Claudia Hürtgen (Norway) Stian Sörlie (Germany) Jörg Viebahn (Sweden) Richard Göransson	BMW Z4 M-Coupe	53
184	E1-XP	11		(Germany) Heinz-Harald Frentzen (Germany) Dominik Schwager (Germany) Dirk Müller (Germany) Marcel Engels	Gumpert Apollo	53
185	SP3T	107	(Germany) Team Rowe Motorsport	(Germany) Michael Zehe (Germany) Franz Rohr (Germany) Jürgen Gerspacher (Germany) Jürgen Hohenester	Audi TT	52
186	S1	258		(Germany) Alexander Trojan (Germany) Dieter Lindenbaum (Germany) Edgar Berners-Schönleben	SEAT Ibiza Cupra TDI	52
187	V6	222		(Germany) Jörg Wiskirchen (Germany) Carsten Welschar (Germany) Dirk Baur (Germany) Meik Utsch	BMW M3 E46	51
188	SP7	98		(United Kingdom) Tony Quinn (Australia) Klark Quinn (New Zealand) Craig Baird (Australia) Jonathon Webb	Porsche 911 GT3 RS	49
189	SP Cup	226		(Austria) Daniela Schmid (Germany) Anja Wassertheurer (Germany) Klaus Niedzwiedz (Germany) Stefan Schlesack	Honda Civic Type R	48
190	V5	211		(Germany) David Rinössl (Denmark) Holger Knudsen (Germany) Peter Tschirley (Germany) Deniz Islek	BMW M3	46
191	SP5	74	(Germany) MSC Ruhr-Blitz Bochum e.V. im ADAC	(Germany) Willi Obermann (Germany) Sven Kehl (Germany) Ulrich Gallade (Germany) "Jens Strack"	BMW M3	39
192	S2	266		(Germany) Christian Vogler (Germany) Hubert Nacken (Germany) Martin Richter (Germany) Ellen Lohr	Alfa Romeo 147	34
193	SP7	29	(Germany) Scuderia Offenbach	(Germany) Mathias Weiland (Germany) Oliver Mayer (Switzerland) Guido Wirtz (Germany) Franz Groß	Porsche 997 GT3 Cup	32
194	SP4	95	(Germany) Team DMV e.V.	(Germany) Jürgen Schumann (Germany) Peter Schumann (Germany) Christian Hohenadel (United Kingdom) Peter Cate	Hyundai Coupe V6	31
195	SP Cup	228	(Germany) Automobilclub von Deutschland e.V.	(Germany) Frank Totz (Germany) Jörg Totz (Germany) Andreas Weiland (Germany) Ralph-Peter Rink	Honda Civic Type R	30
196	SP5	77		(Germany) Michael Bonk (Germany) Peter Bonk (United Kingdom) Willie Moore (Germany) Wolf Silvester	BMW M3	29
197	SP3	123		(Germany) Christian Benz (Germany) Stefan Benz	Renault Clio	29
198	SP7	32		(Germany) Peter Schmidt (Germany) David Horn (Germany) Josef Klüber (France) Philippe Haezebrouck	Porsche 996 GT3 Cup	28
199	SP3T	101		(Germany) Helmut Dutz (Germany) Bruno Fechner (Germany) Sebastian Erkes (Germany) Wolfgang Kaufmann	Mitsubishi Lancer Evo 8	28
200	SP1-SP2	151		(Austria) Karl-Heinz Teichmann (Germany) Michael Schneider (Germany) Niki Schelle	Suzuki Swift	28
201	V6	218	(Germany) MSC Odenkirchen	(Germany) Christian Wack (Germany) Axel Duffner (Germany) Michael Überall	BMW M3	27
202	SP5	71		(Germany) Peter Seher (United States) Michael David (Germany) Kornelius Hoffmann (Germany) Hans Schütt	BMW M3	25
203	SP6	63		(Japan) Hiroyuki Kishimoto (Japan) Izumi Yoshida (Japan) Akihiko Fujioka (Germany) Jürgen Bussmann	BMW M3	22
204	V3-V4	188		(Germany) Ralph Caba (Germany) Volker Lange (Germany) Thomas Wolf	Ford Fiesta ST	16
205	SP1-SP2	157		(Germany) Jana Meiswinkel (Germany) Dennis Busch (Germany) Marc Busch (Germany) Jutta Beisiegel	Ford Fiesta	14
206	SP6	66	(United Kingdom) RJN Motorsport	(Belgium) Vincent Vosse (Denmark) Nicki Thiim (United Kingdom) Alex Buncombe (Germany) Harald Müller	Nissan 350Z	12
207	SP6	56	(Germany) Bonnfinanz Motorsport	(Germany) Oliver Rövenich (Germany) Thomas Brügmann (Germany) Mario Merten (Germany) Wolf Silvester	Porsche 996 GT3 Cup	12
208	V5	217		(Germany) Sven Rau (Germany) Martin Heidrich (Germany) Christoph Eicker (Germany) Nils Bartels	BMW M3 E36	10
209	SP4	60		(Germany) Ulrich Andree (Germany) Andy Middendorf	Volvo S60	8
210	SP3	141		(United Kingdom) David Smith (United Kingdom) "Duke" (United Kingdom) Malcolm Edeson (United Kingdom) Angus Kirkwood	Alfa Romeo 156	7
211	SP3	134		(Germany) Matthias Holle (Germany) Wolfgang Weber (Germany) Uwe Nittel (Germany) Norbert Bermes	Honda S2000 GT	4
212	SP3T	109		(Russia) Mikhail Zasadych (Russia) Ilya Burenko (Russia) Oleg Kvitka	SEAT León Supercopa	4
213	SP3	135		(Germany) Uwe Reich (Germany) Alexander Starke (Germany) Robert Lommel (Germany) Markus Leger	Renault Clio RS	4
214	V3-V4	192		(Germany) Ralf Völkel (Germany) Karsten Schmitt (Germany) Norbert Werner (Germany) Marc Kippschull	Opel Astra GSI	4
215	SP6	58		(Germany) Martina Bossert (Germany) Dominiek an der Heiden (Germany) Matthias Wasel (Germany) Marco Schelp	BMW M3 E46	3
216	S1	260		(Germany) "Smudo" (Germany) Thomas von Löwis of Menar (Germany) Lutz Wolsenburg (Germany) Erik Schwarz	Ford Mustang GT RTD	1
217	SP7	41		(Germany) Michael Düchting (Germany) Horst von Saurma (Germany) Dennis Rostek (Germany) Altfrid Heger	Audi R8	0
218	SP3T	106	(Germany) OPEL OPC RACE CAMP	(Germany) Christian Bollrath (Germany) Peter Pangert (Germany) Alex Plenagl (Germany) Benjamin Scharf	Opel Astra GTC	0
219	SP5	72		(Hungary) Walter Csaba (Hungary) Palik Laszlo (Hungary) Gabor Grigalek (Hungary) Janos Vida	BMW M3 E36	0
220	SP8	18	(Germany) AC Radevormwald e.V. im ADAC	(Germany) Martin Wagenstetter (Germany) Heinz-Werner Lenz (Germany) Mirco Schultis (Germany) Paul Hulverscheid	BMW 840 CI	0
221	SP3T	103	(Germany) Kissling Motorsport	(Germany) Alexander Hofmann (Germany) Marcus Schurig (Germany) Jochen Übler (Germany) Mayk Wienkötter	Opel Astra GTC	0
222	SP6	57		(Germany) Patrick Kentenich (United Kingdom) Adam Sharpe (United Kingdom) George Haynes (Germany) Norman Starke	BMW M3 E46 CSL	0
223	S2	275	(Germany) Team DMV e.V.	(Germany) Thomas Hanisch (Germany) Stefan Gies (Germany) Klaus Leinfelder (Germany) Michael Hess	Audi A4	0

== Bibliography ==
- Jörg-Richard Ufer & Tim Upietz. 24 Stunden Nürburgring Nordschleife 2008 (in German). Gruppe C Motorsport Verlag. ISBN 978-3-928540-55-1.
