= Gianluca De Lorenzi =

Italian auto racing driver and team owner

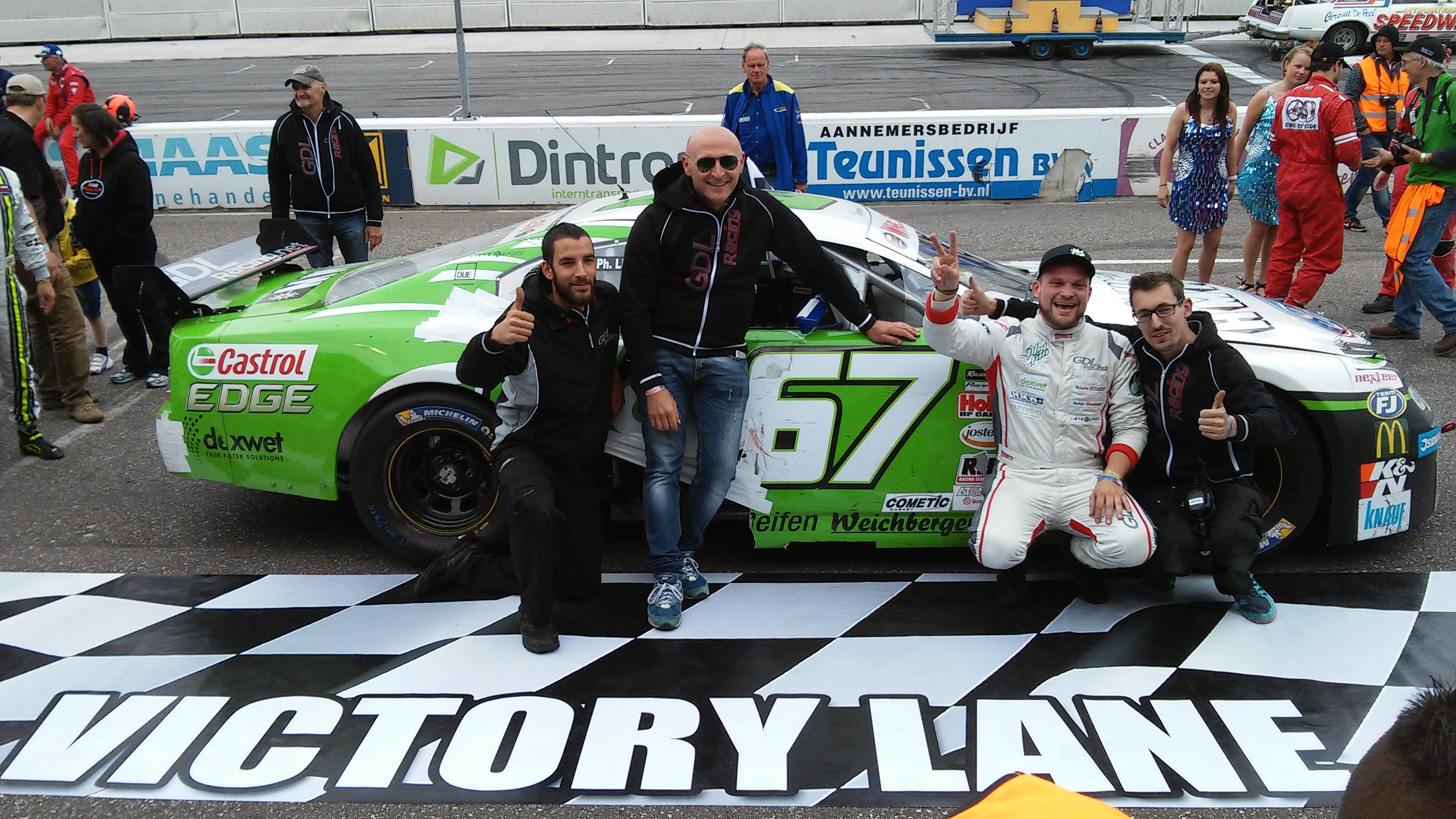
- De Lorenzi (middle) celebrating his team's win at Raceway Venray in 2015.
- Nationality: (Italy) Italian
- Born: 21 February 1972 (age 54) Ravenna, Italy
- Categorisation: FIA Bronze

Gianluca De Lorenzi (born February 21, 1972, in Ravenna) is an Italian auto racing driver and team owner.

== Career ==
After previously competing in karting, De Lorenzi began competing in the Italian Formula Three Championship in 1991. He moved to touring cars in 1996, competing in the Italian Super Touring Championship.

De Lorenzi raced for the works Alfa Romeo team, Alfa Team Nordauto in the European Super Touring Championship in 2000, finishing the season in seventh place. In 2001, he formed his own team, GDL Racing to compete in the championship, finishing seventh again as a driver for the team.

De Lorenzi finished runner-up to Salvatore Tavano in the Italian Super Touring Championship in 2003 with GDL Racing, and finished third in 2004. In 2005, the Italian championship was part of the new World Touring Car Championship for three rounds, as De Lorenzi finished runner-up once again in the Italian series, this time beaten by Alex Zanardi.

After concentrating on team management in 2006, De Lorenzi returned to the cockpit in 2007, finishing as runner-up in the Porsche Carrera Cup Italy.

== Racing record ==
=== Complete World Touring Car Championship results ===
(key) (Races in bold indicate pole position) (Races in italics indicate fastest lap)

Year	Team	Car	1	2	3	4	5	6	7	8	9	10	11	12	13	14	15	16	17	18	19	20	DC	Points
2005	GDL Racing	BMW 320i	ITA; 1; 23	ITA; 2 Ret	FRA; 1; 20	FRA; 2; 19	GBR; 1	GBR; 2	SMR; 1; 21	SMR; 2; 17	MEX; 1	MEX; 2	BEL; 1	BEL; 2	GER; 1	GER; 2	TUR; 1	TUR; 2	ESP; 1	ESP; 2	MAC; 1	MAC; 2	NC	0

=== NASCAR ===
(key) (Bold – Pole position awarded by qualifying time. Italics – Pole position earned by points standings or practice time. * – Most laps led.)

==== Whelen Euro Series - Elite 1 ====
NASCAR Whelen Euro Series - Elite 1 results
Year	Team	No.	Make	1	2	3	4	5	6	7	8	9	10	11	12	NWES	Points
2014	GDL Racing	67	Ford	VAL	VAL	BRH	BRH	TOU	TOU	NÜR	NÜR	UMB; 6	UMB; 19	LEM; 22	LEM; 25	23rd	170
2015	GDL Racing	87	Ford	VAL	VAL	VEN	VEN	BRH	BRH	TOU	TOU	UMB	UMB	ZOL; 19	ZOL; 21	31st	68
