= Thomas Jäger =

German racing driver (born 1976)

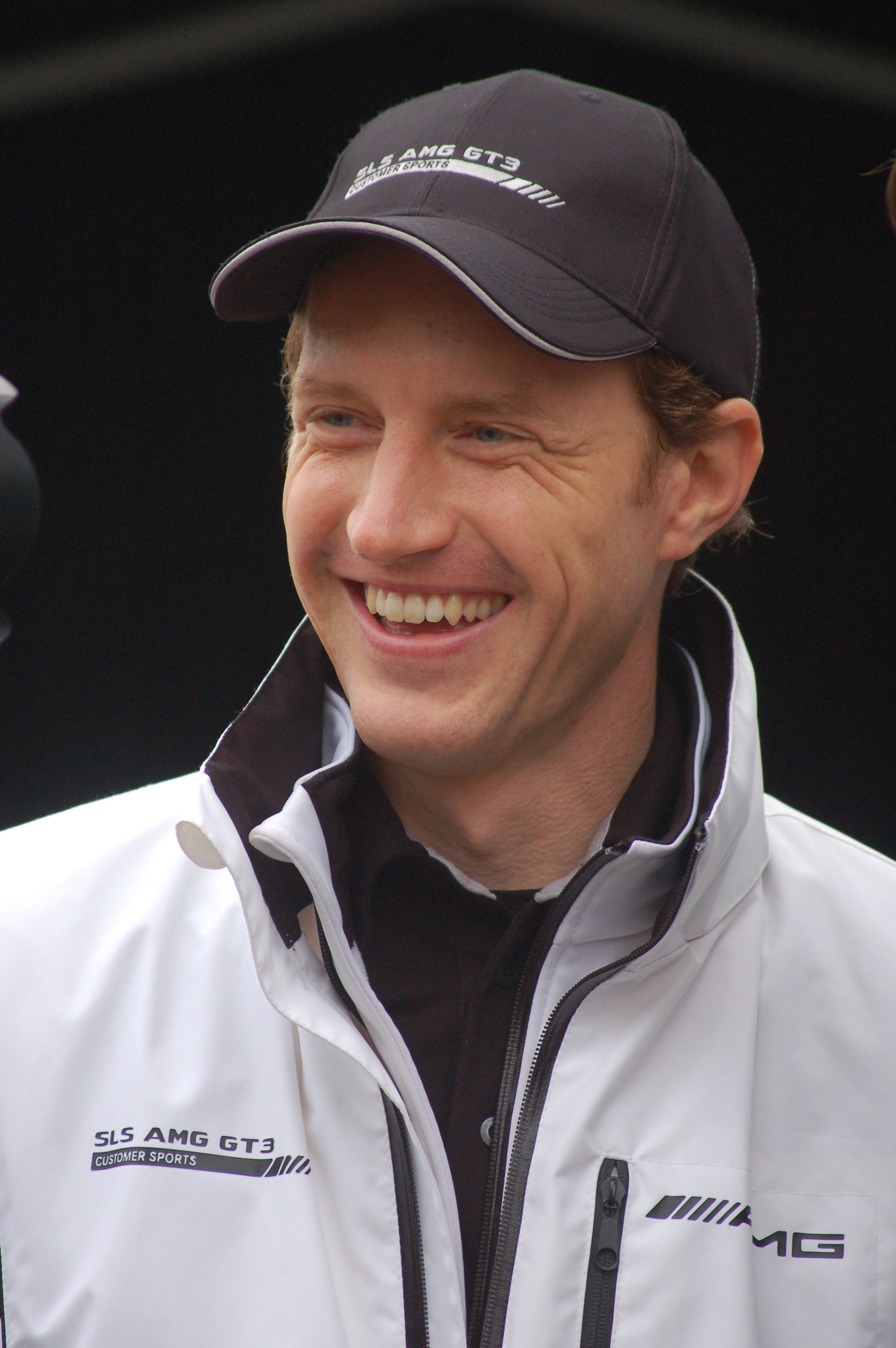
- Jäger in 2011.
- Nationality: German
- Born: 27 October 1976 (age 50) Chemnitz, East Germany

ADAC GT Masters
- Categorisation: FIA Gold (until 2013, 2017–); FIA Platinum (2014–2016)
- Years active: 2008–13
- Teams: Polarweiss Racing; MS Racing; Callaway Competition; Schnabl Engineering
- Starts: 32
- Wins: 1
- Poles: 2
- Fastest laps: 3
- Best finish: 15th in 2010

Previous series
- 2010, 12 2007–09 2005 2000–03 1998–99: FIA GT1 World Championship; Porsche Carrera Cup Germany; World Touring Car Championship; Deutsche Tourenwagen Masters; German Formula Three

Championship titles
- 2015 2009: 24H Series; Porsche Carrera Cup Germany

Thomas Jäger (born 27 October 1976) is a German professional racing driver for Mercedes-AMG.

== Career ==
Born in Chemnitz, Jäger competed in the Renault Spider Trophy in 1997. He began competing in the German Formula Three Championship in 1998, where he finished third behind Christijan Albers and Marcel Fässler in 1999.

Jäger then raced in the DTM for Mercedes-Benz between 2000 and 2003. He took two podiums and a best championship finish of seventh, in 2001. Jäger was signed by Hotfiel Sport for their World Touring Car Championship campaign in 2005, although Jäger left after four rounds.

Jäger won the German Mini Challenge in 2006, and moved to the Porsche Carrera Cup Germany in 2007, which he won in 2009.

In 2010, Jäger began working as coordinator for AMG Customer Sports.

Jäger won the 2013 Liqui Moly Bathurst 12 Hour at the Mount Panorama Circuit in Australia driving a Mercedes-Benz SLS AMG GT3 for Australian team Erebus Motorsport alongside fellow Germans Alexander Roloff and Bernd Schneider. He returned to "The Mountain" for the 2014 race where he finished second in a SLS AMG GT3 alongside Maximilian Buhk and Harold Primat. After missing the 2015 race, he returned in 2016 to again link with Erebus and again in a Mercedes SLS AMG finished in fifth place driving with Nico Bastian and Australian driver David Reynolds.

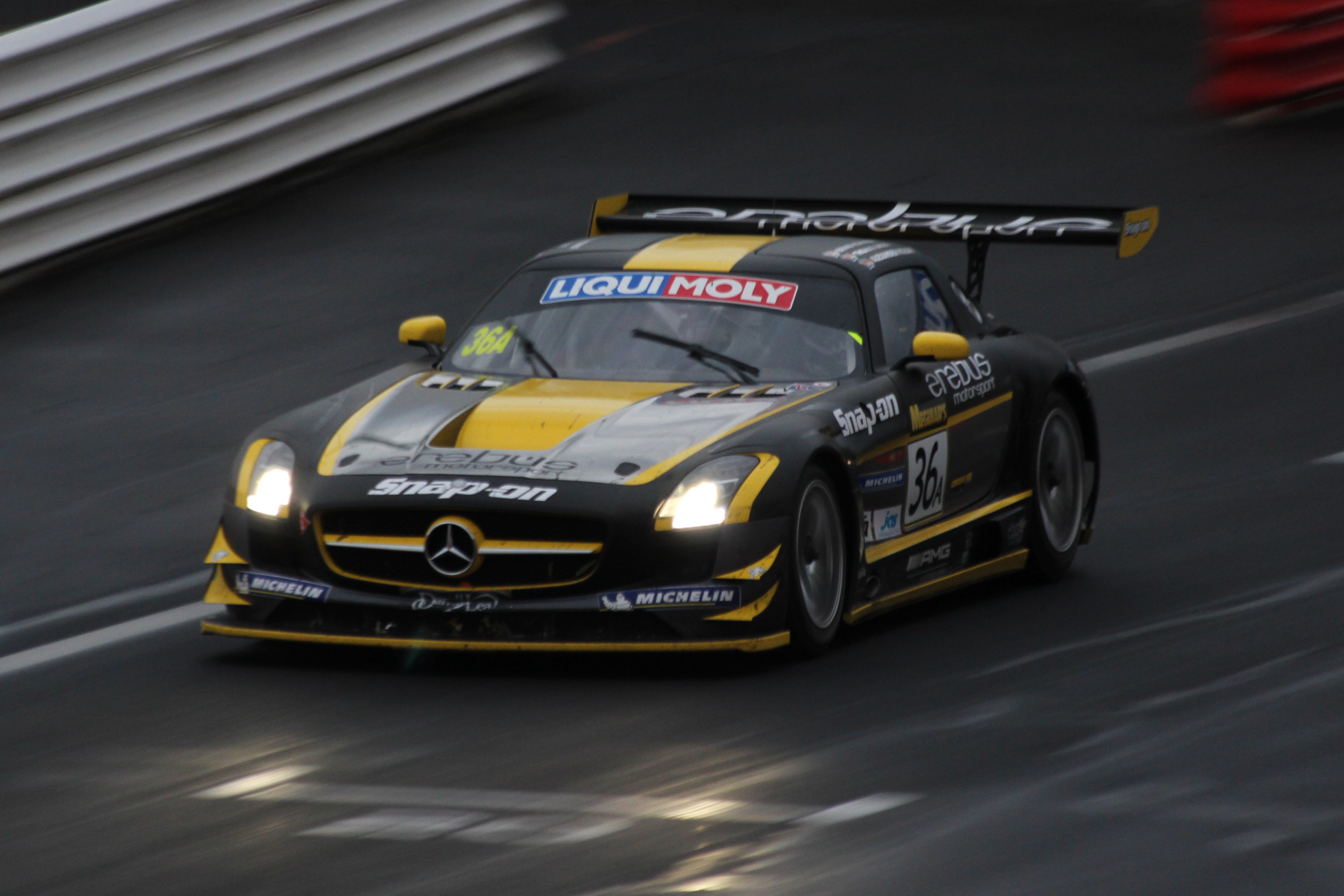
The 2013 Bathurst 12 Hour race winning Mercedes-Benz SLS AMG of Thomas Jäger, Alexander Roloff and Bernd Schneider.

== Racing record ==
=== Complete Deutsche Tourenwagen Masters results ===
(key) (Races in bold indicate pole position) (Races in italics indicate fastest lap)

Year	Team	Car	1	2	3	4	5	6	7	8	9	10	11	12	13	14	15	16	17	18	19	20	Pos.	Pts
2000	Team D2 AMG	AMG Mercedes CLK-DTM	HOC; 1; 7	HOC; 2; 14	OSC; 1; 6	OSC; 2; 4	NOR; 1; 7	NOR; 2; 13	SAC; 1 NC	SAC; 2; 9	NÜR; 1; 7	NÜR; 2; 17	LAU; 1 C	LAU; 2 C	OSC; 1 DNS	OSC; 2; 8	NÜR; 1; 7	NÜR; 2; 3	HOC; 1; 12	HOC; 2; 8			11th	52
2001	Team D2 AMG	AMG Mercedes CLK-DTM	HOC; QR; 3	HOC; CR; 5	NÜR; QR; 4	NÜR; CR; 3	OSC; QR; 9	OSC; CR; 10	SAC; QR; 14	SAC; CR; 13	NOR; QR; 20	NOR; CR; DNS	LAU; QR; 7	LAU; CR; 4	NÜR; QR; Ret	NÜR; CR; 4	A1R; QR; Ret	A1R; CR; DNS	ZAN; QR; 12	ZAN; CR; 12	HOC; QR; 12	HOC; CR; 10	7th	43
2002	Persson Motorsport	AMG Mercedes CLK-DTM 2001	HOC; QR; 19	HOC; CR; 8	ZOL; QR; 14	ZOL; CR; 19†	DON; QR; 10	DON; CR; 11	SAC; QR; 14	SAC; CR; 15	NOR; QR; 7	NOR; CR; Ret	LAU; QR; 12	LAU; CR; 13	NÜR; QR; 7	NÜR; CR; 13	A1R; QR; 14	A1R; CR; 17	ZAN; QR; 12	ZAN; CR; 9	HOC; QR; 15	HOC; CR; 11	18th	0
2003	Persson Motorsport	AMG Mercedes CLK-DTM 2002	HOC; 10	ADR; Ret	NÜR; 12	LAU; 14	NOR; 9	DON; 7	NÜR; Ret	A1R; 9	ZAN; 13	HOC; 11											13th	2

- † — Retired, but was classified as he completed 90% of the winner's race distance.

=== Complete World Touring Car Championship results ===
(key) (Races in bold indicate pole position) (Races in italics indicate fastest lap)

Year	Team	Car	1	2	3	4	5	6	7	8	9	10	11	12	13	14	15	16	17	18	19	20	DC	Pts
2005	Ford Hotfiel Sport	Ford Focus	ITA; 1; 28	ITA; 2 Ret	FRA; 1; 24	FRA; 2; 22	GBR; 1; 18	GBR; 2; 17	SMR; 1; 26	SMR; 2; 19	MEX; 1	MEX; 2	BEL; 1	BEL; 2	GER; 1	GER; 2	TUR; 1	TUR; 2	ESP; 1	ESP; 2	MAC; 1	MAC; 2	NC	0

=== Complete GT1 World Championship results ===
Year	Team	Car	1	2	3	4	5	6	7	8	9	10	11	12	13	14	15	16	17	18	19	20	Pos.	Pts
2010	All-Inkl.com Münnich Motorsport	Lamborghini	ABU; QR; Ret	ABU; CR; 17	SIL; QR	SIL; CR	BRN; QR; 14	BRN; CR; 13	PRI; QR	PRI; CR	SPA; QR	SPA; CR	NÜR; QR; DNS	NÜR; CR; 19	ALG; QR	ALG; CR	NAV; QR	NAV; CR	INT; QR	INT; CR	SAN; QR	SAN; CR	54th	0
2012	All-Inkl.com Münnich Motorsport	Mercedes-Benz	NOG; QR; 7	NOG; CR; 4	ZOL; QR; 2	ZOL; CR; 4	NAV; QR; 6	NAV; QR; 3	SVK; QR; 8	SVK; CR; 10	ALG; QR; 6	ALG; CR; 1	SVK; QR; 4	SVK; CR; 8	MOS; QR; 5	MOS; CR; 8	NÜR; QR; 6	NÜR; CR; 8	DON; QR; 6	DON; CR; 6			6th	100

=== Complete Bathurst 12 Hour results ===
Year	Team	Co-Drivers	Car	Class	Laps	Pos.	Class Pos.
2013	(Australia) Erebus Motorsport	(Germany) Alexander Roloff (Germany) Bernd Schneider	Mercedes-Benz SLS AMG	A	268	**1st**	**1st**
2014	(Germany) HTP Motorsport	(Germany) Maximilian Buhk (Switzerland) Harold Primat	Mercedes-Benz SLS AMG	A	296	**2nd**	**2nd**
2016	(Australia) Erebus Motorsport	(Germany) Nico Bastian (Australia) David Reynolds	Mercedes-Benz SLS AMG	AP	296	5th	5th

Sporting positions
Preceded by René Rast	Porsche Carrera Cup Germany champion 2009	Succeeded by Nicolas Armindo
Preceded by Christopher Mies; Darryl O'Young; Christer Jöns	Winner of the Bathurst 12 Hour; 2013 (with Bernd Schneider & Alexander Roloff)	Succeeded by John Bowe; Peter Edwards; Craig Lowndes; Mika Salo
