= Giuseppe Cirò =

Italian racing driver

- Nationality: Italian
- Born: 28 November 1975 (age 50) Rossano (Italy)

Previous series
- 2005: World Touring Car Championship

Championship titles
- 1996, 2003, 2004: Italian Renault Clio Cup

Giuseppe Cirò (born 28 November 1975, in Rossano) is an Italian auto racing driver.

== Career ==
Cirò started his racing career in 1990 through karting. He started circuit racing in 1995 with Italian Renault Clio Cup, winning the championship three times in 1996, 2003 and 2004. Between those titles, he also competed in the Italian Renault Megane Cup and the Renault Clio Eurocup.

In 2005, the team Cirò was driving for, Proteam Motorsport, entered the inaugural FIA World Touring Car Championship. He drove a BMW 320i alongside fellow Italian Stefano D'Aste for the Independent Trophy. A reasonable season saw him finish with one championship point achieved in the final round at Macau. For the 2006 season, he was replaced in the team by Luca Rangoni. He competed in the Ferrari Challenge in 2006, ending the season third on points. After a drive in the 2007 Europe Mégane Trophy, he returned to the Ferrari Challenge for 2008. Cirò also entered one round of the FIA GT3 European Championship that year, in an Aston Martin DBRS9.

== Racing record ==
=== Complete World Touring Car Championship results ===
(key) (Races in bold indicate pole position) (Races in italics indicate fastest lap)

| Year | Team | Car | 1 | 2 | 3 | 4 | 5 | 6 | 7 | 8 | 9 | 10 | 11 | 12 | 13 | 14 | 15 | 16 | 17 | 18 | 19 | 20 | DC | Points |
|---|---|---|---|---|---|---|---|---|---|---|---|---|---|---|---|---|---|---|---|---|---|---|---|---|
| 2005 | Proteam Motorsport | BMW 320i | ITA; 1 Ret | ITA; 2; 18 | FRA; 1; 21 | FRA; 2; 18 | GBR; 1; 22 | GBR; 2; 11 | SMR; 1 Ret | SMR; 2 DNS | MEX; 1; 14 | MEX; 2; 9 | BEL; 1; 15 | BEL; 2; 15 | GER; 1; 24 | GER; 2; 16 | TUR; 1; 12 | TUR; 2; 14 | ESP; 1; 12 | ESP; 2; 10 | MAC; 1 Ret | MAC; 2; 8 | 22nd | 1 |
