= Michael Funke =

German racing driver

Michael Funke (born 26 September 1969 in Meerbusch) is a German auto racing driver.

== Career ==
Funke finished third in the German Touring Car Challenge in 1999 and 2000, and was runner-up in 2001. The championship became the DMSB Produktionswagen Meisterschaft in 2004, and Funke finished third for Hotfiel Sport.

Hotfiel moved to the new World Touring Car Championship in 2005, and Funke was test and reserve driver. He replaced Thomas Jäger for the final five rounds of the season, scoring a best finish of tenth position.

Funke has since competed in ADAC GT Masters.

== Racing record ==
=== Complete World Touring Car Championship results ===
(key) (Races in bold indicate pole position) (Races in italics indicate fastest lap)

Year	Team	Car	1	2	3	4	5	6	7	8	9	10	11	12	13	14	15	16	17	18	19	20	DC	Points
2005	Ford Hotfiel Sport	Ford Focus	ITA; 1	ITA; 2	FRA; 1	FRA; 2	GBR; 1	GBR; 2	SMR; 1	SMR; 2	MEX; 1	MEX; 2	BEL; 1 DNS	BEL; 2 DNS	GER; 1; 12	GER; 2; 10	TUR; 1 Ret	TUR; 2 DNS	ESP; 1 Ret	ESP; 2; 18	MAC; 1; 17	MAC; 2 DNS	NC	0
