= Carl Rosenblad (racing driver) =

Swedish auto racing driver (born 1969)

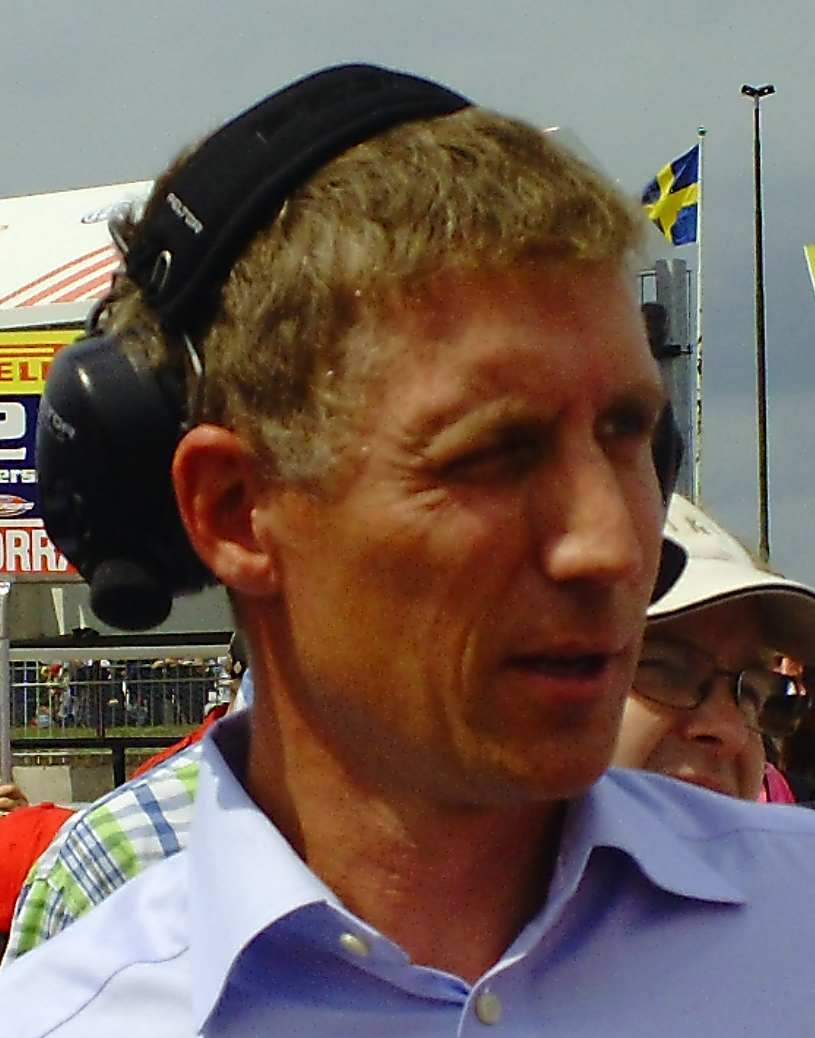
Carl Rosenblad, 2011.

Carl Gustav Julius "Calle" Rosenblad (born 28 April 1969, in Västervik) is a Swedish auto racing driver. He is married with two children.

== Racing career ==
Rosenblad's first racing was in Swedish Formula Opel in 1990, where he drove for four seasons. He also drove in the Swedish Porsche Challenge and the European Interseries from 1991. In 1996, he got a drive in the International Formula 3000, with the British Alpha Plus Team. The season was not a successful one, ending with no championship points. In 1997, he switched to the FIA GT Championship, with a GT1 Class Porsche 911 for the Kremer Racing Team, again with little success.

Rosenblad moved to touring cars in 1998, driving a Nissan Primera in the Swedish Touring Car Championship. In 1998, he also raced the Rolex 24h at Daytona for Larbre Compétition, ending in a strong third place (total).

In 2002, Rosenblad returned for another season in the FIA GT Championship in a Chrysler Viper GTS-R for Larbre Compétition.

Rosenblad has competed regularly in the STCC since (some race wins), as well as selected rounds in both European Touring Car Championship and World Touring Car Championship during the years 2001 - 2007. In 2005, he first competed in the FIA World Touring Car Championship for Crawford Racing in an independent BMW 320i. He competed in four rounds of the WTCC in 2007 for Elgh Motorsport. Also in 2007, he competed in the 24 Hours of Le Mans, in a GT2 Ferrari F430 for G.P.C. Sport.

In 2009, Rosenblad only participated in one race, the Spa 24 Hours driving a Maserati MC12 GT1 for Vitaphone Racing finishing in second place.

== Racing record ==
=== Complete 24 Hours of Le Mans results ===
Year	Team	Co-Drivers	Car	Class	Laps	Pos.	Class Pos.
1996	(Italy) Ennea SRL Igol	(Italy) Luciano della Noce (Sweden) Anders Olofsson	Ferrari F40 GTE	GT1	98	DNF	DNF
1997	(Germany) Kremer Racing	(Spain) Tomás Saldaña (Germany) Jürgen Lässig	Kremer K8 Spyder	LMP	103	DNF	DNF
1998	(France) Chereau Sports (France) Larbre Compétition	(France) Jean-Pierre Jarier (United Kingdom) Robin Donovan	Porsche 911 GT2	GT2	164	DNF	DNF
1999	(France) Riley & Scott Europe (France) Solution F	(Italy) Marco Apicella (United States) Shane Lewis	Riley & Scott Mk III/2-Ford	LMP	67	DNF	DNF
2001	(France) Paul Belmondo Racing	(Belgium) Vincent Vosse (Belgium) Vanina Ickx	Chrysler Viper GTS-R	GTS	61	DNF	DNF
2002	(France) Larbre Compétition	(France) Jean-Luc Chéreau (France) Jean-Claude Lagniez	Chrysler Viper GTS-R	GTS	278	25th	6th
2003	(France) Courage Compétition	(France) David Hallyday (France) Philippe Alliot	Courage C65-JPX	LMP675	41	DNF	DNF
2007	(Italy) GPC Sport	(Hong Kong) Matthew Marsh (Spain) Jesús Diez Villaroel	Ferrari F430 GT2	GT2	252	DNF	DNF

=== Complete World Touring Car Championship results ===
(key) (Races in bold indicate pole position) (Races in italics indicate fastest lap)

Year	Team	Car	1	2	3	4	5	6	7	8	9	10	11	12	13	14	15	16	17	18	19	20	21	22	DC	Points
2005	Crawford Racing	BMW 320i	ITA; 1 DNS	ITA; 2 DNS	FRA; 1; 14	FRA; 2; 15	GBR; 1; 21	GBR; 2; 12	SMR; 1; 16	SMR; 2 Ret	MEX; 1; 16	MEX; 2; 15	BEL; 1; 22	BEL; 2; 12	GER; 1; 22	GER; 2; 17	TUR; 1; 11	TUR; 2; 18	ESP; 1 Ret	ESP; 2; 16	MAC; 1; 12	MAC; 2 Ret			NC	0
2007	Elgh Motorsport	BMW 320si	BRA; 1	BRA; 2	NED; 1	NED; 2	ESP; 1	ESP; 2	FRA; 1	FRA; 2	CZE; 1	CZE; 2	POR; 1	POR; 2	SWE; 1; 25	SWE; 2; 17	GER; 1	GER; 2	GBR; 1	GBR; 2	ITA; 1; 20	ITA; 2; 17	MAC; 1	MAC; 2	NC	0
