= Marc Hennerici =

German auto racing driver (born 1982)

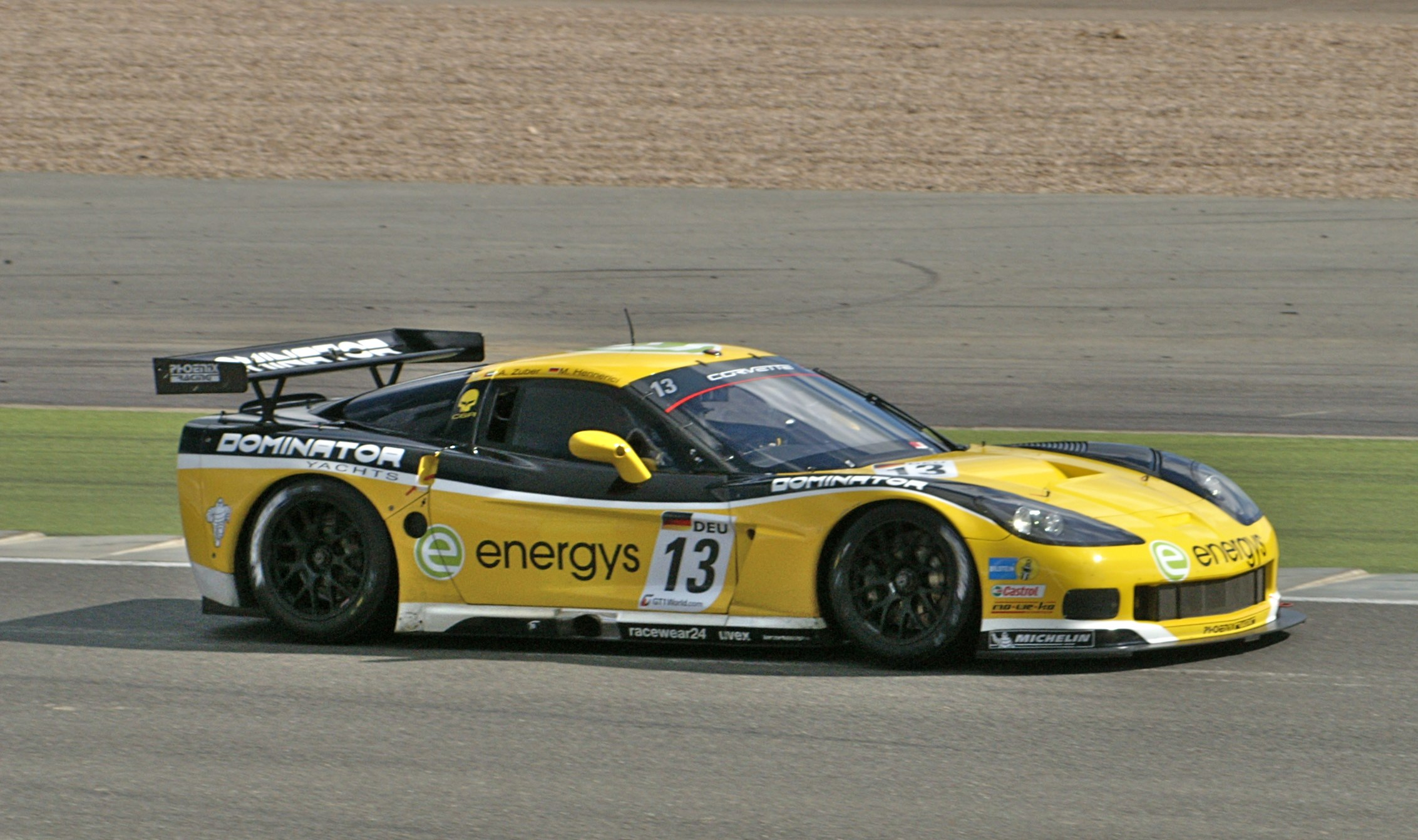
- Hennerici in 2010
- Nationality: (Germany) German
- Born: Marc Wolfgang Hennerici; 10 May 1982 (age 44) Mayen, West Germany
- Categorisation: FIA Gold (until 2019); FIA Silver (2023–)

Marc Wolfgang Hennerici (born 10 May 1982 in Mayen) is a German auto racing driver. He is best known for being the first champion of the World Touring Car Championship's Independent Trophy in 2005, besides a short but prolific GT1 and GT3 career.

He is the grandson of amputee racing driver Heinz Hennerici, himself the twin brother of Eifelland founder Günther Hennerici.

In 2026, Hennerici was named managing director of NLS team PROsport Racing.

== Racing career ==
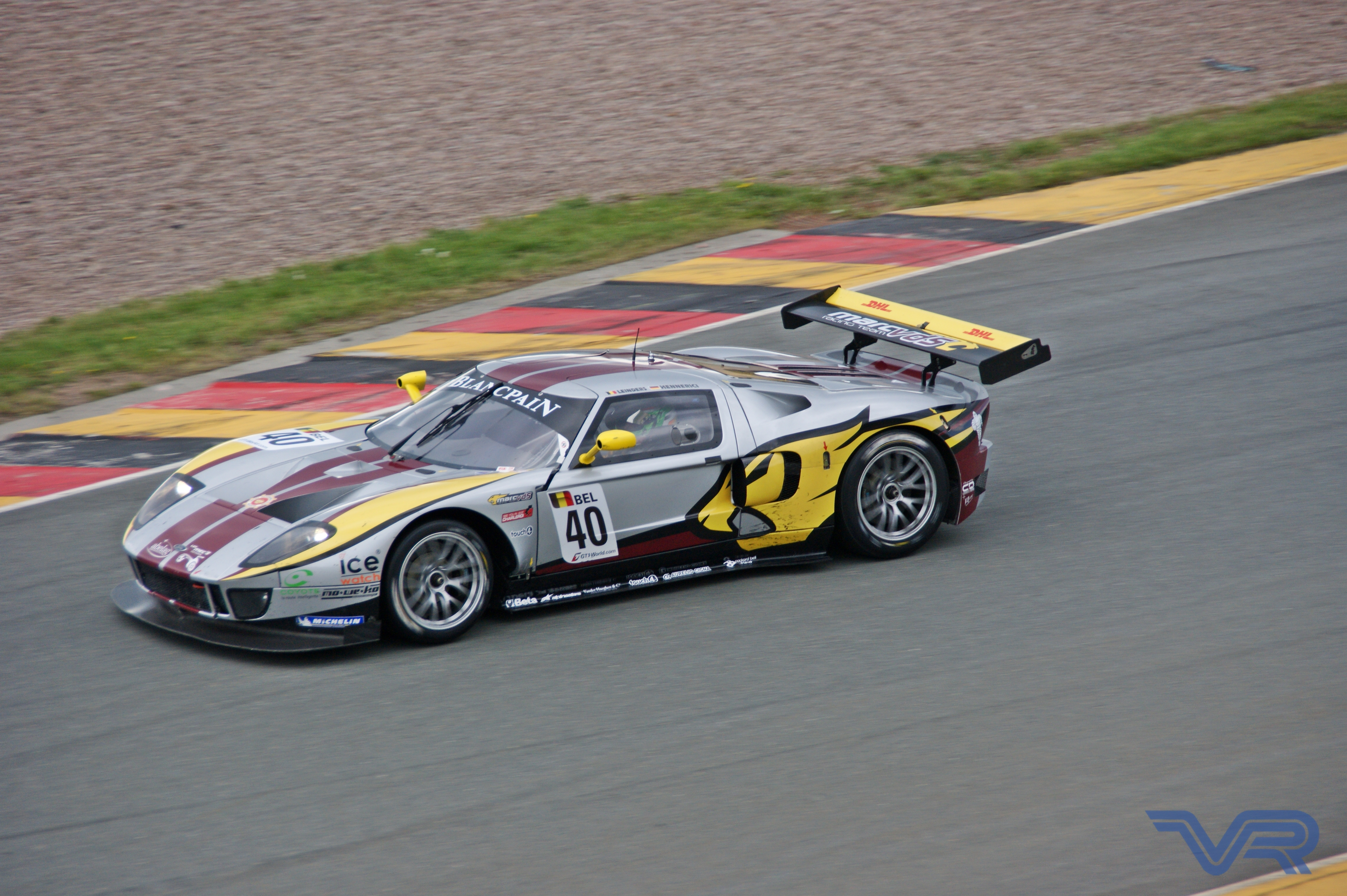
Hennerici racing for Marc VDS in 2011.

Hennerici competed in Formula BMW from 1999 and 2001. In 2003, he won the Alfa Romeo 147 Cup in Germany. In 2004, he competed in the DMSB Produktionswagen Meisterschaft driving a BMW 320i for Wiechers-Sport, finishing fourth. He and Wiechers-Sport moved to the new World Touring Car Championship in 2005. Despite not scoring any points in the main championship when rival independent Tom Coronel scored 11, he still was able to win the Independent Trophy. In 2006, he finished fifth in the VLN series. He often competes in the 24 Hours of Nürburgring. He currently competes in ADAC GT Masters.

== Racing record ==
=== Complete World Touring Car Championship results ===
(key) (Races in bold indicate pole position) (Races in italics indicate fastest lap)

Year	Team	Car	1	2	3	4	5	6	7	8	9	10	11	12	13	14	15	16	17	18	19	20	DC	Points
2005	Wiechers-Sport	BMW 320i	ITA; 1; 13	ITA; 2; 10	FRA; 1; 13	FRA; 2; 17	GBR; 1; 17	GBR; 2; 9	SMR; 1 Ret	SMR; 2 DNS	MEX; 1; 17	MEX; 2; 14	BEL; 1; 18	BEL; 2; 19	GER; 1; 16	GER; 2; 21	TUR; 1; 13	TUR; 2; 11	ESP; 1 Ret	ESP; 2; 20	MAC; 1; 14	MAC; 2 Ret	NC	0

=== Complete FIA GT1 World Championship results ===
Year	Team	Car	1	2	3	4	5	6	7	8	9	10	11	12	13	14	15	16	17	18	19	20	Pos	Points
2010	Phoenix Racing / Carsport	Corvette	ABU; QR; 1	ABU; CR; 2	SIL; QR; 11	SIL; CR; Ret	BRN; QR; 17	BRN; CR; 8	PRI; QR; 6	PRI; CR; 5	SPA; QR; EX	SPA; CR; 13	NÜR; QR; 2	NÜR; CR; 3	ALG; QR; 3	ALG; CR; 3	NAV; QR; 11	NAV; CR; 8	INT; QR; 6	INT; CR; 3	SAN; QR; 18	SAN; CR; 12	5th	99
2011	Marc VDS Racing Team	Ford	ABU; QR; 11	ABU; CR; DNS	ZOL; QR; Ret	ZOL; CR; 10	ALG; QR; Ret	ALG; CR; 10	SAC; QR; Ret	SAC; CR; 8	SIL; QR; 11	SIL; CR; 6	NAV; QR; 12	NAV; CR; 10	PRI; QR; Ret	PRI; CR; 12	ORD; QR; 10	ORD; CR; 10	BEI; QR; Ret	BEI; CR; Ret	SAN; QR	SAN; CR	24th	16

Sporting positions
Preceded by Tom Coronel (ETCC)	World Touring Car Championship; Independents' Trophy winner 2005	Succeeded by Tom Coronel
