= Thomas Klenke =

German racing driver

Thomas Klenke (born 31 October 1966 in Bad Pyrmont, Lower Saxony) is a German auto racing driver. In 2005, he competed in the FIA World Touring Car Championship for Ford Hotfiel Sport in a Ford Focus. The car was uncompetitive and Klenke scored no championship points with a best placed finish of tenth in Oschersleben. The team did not return to the WTCC in 2006.

In 2009 Klenke won the 24 Hours of Nürburgring AT class in an alternative fuelled Volkswagen Scirocco GT24-CNG alongside Vanina Ickx, Peter Terting and Klaus Niedzwiedz.

Klenke's previous racing included Formula Renault in 1991. Most of his career has been spent in touring cars, competing in the German Touring Car Challenge, winning the championship in 2002 with Hotfiel Sport. Klenke also competed as an independent driver in the European Touring Car Championship.

== Results ==
=== Complete World Touring Car Championship results ===
(key) (Races in bold indicate pole position) (Races in italics indicate fastest lap)

Year	Team	Car	1	2	3	4	5	6	7	8	9	10	11	12	13	14	15	16	17	18	19	20	DC	Points
2005	Ford Hotfiel Sport	Ford Focus	ITA; 1 Ret	ITA; 2 DNS	FRA; 1 Ret	FRA; 2; 23	GBR; 1; 19	GBR; 2; 18	SMR; 1; 17	SMR; 2; 16	MEX; 1	MEX; 2	BEL; 1; 21	BEL; 2 Ret	GER; 1; 10	GER; 2; 20	TUR; 1 Ret	TUR; 2; 17	ESP; 1 Ret	ESP; 2 DNS	MAC; 1	MAC; 2	NC	0

Sporting positions
Preceded by Markus Gedlich	ADAC Procar Series Champion; 2002	Succeeded by Claudia Hürtgen
