= Stefano D'Aste =

Italian racing driver (born 1974)

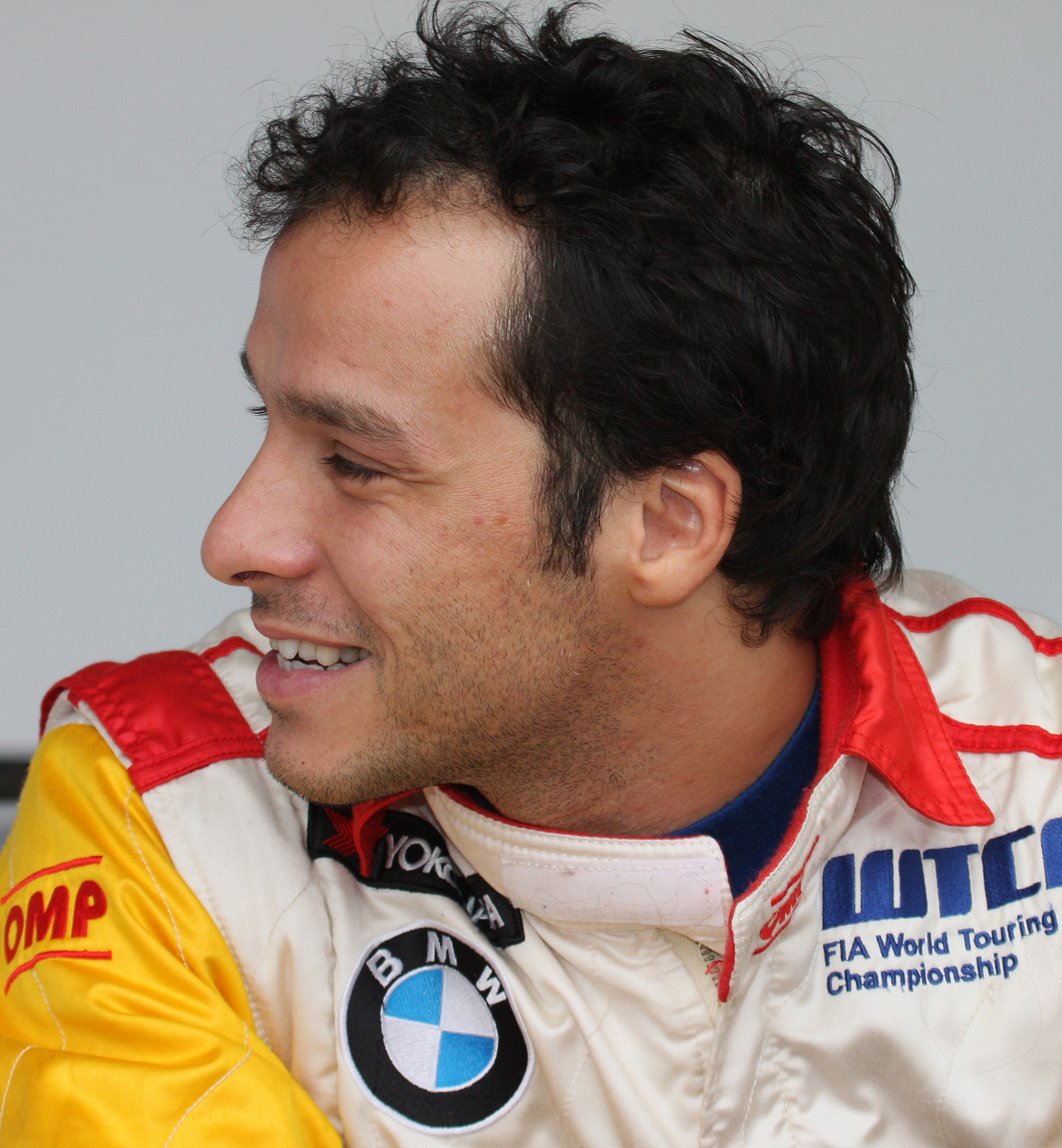
- D'Aste at the 2009 FIA WTCC Race of Japan.
- Nationality: Italian
- Born: 26 February 1974 (age 52) Genoa, Italy

World Touring Car Championship career
- Debut season: 2005
- Current team: Münnich Motorsport
- Categorisation: FIA Silver
- Car number: 26
- Former teams: Proteam Motorsport, Wiechers-Sport, PB Racing
- Starts: 200
- Wins: 2
- Poles: 0
- Fastest laps: 1
- Best finish: 7th in 2012

Previous series
- 2008, 2011 2005 2004 2001–2002 2000: GT4 European Cup; Italian Superturismo Championship; European Touring Car Championship; Renault Sport Clio Trophy; Italian Formula Renault

Championship titles
- 2007: WTCC Independents' Trophy

Stefano D'Aste (born 26 February 1974 in Genoa) is an Italian auto racing driver.

His early racing career included competing on motorcycles and the Monza International Rally. He has competed in the World Touring Car Championship between 2004 (when it was known as the European Touring Car Championship) and 2013.

== Racing career ==
=== World Touring Car Championship ===
==== Proteam Motorsport (2005–06) ====
In 2005 D'Aste competed for Proteam Motorsport in a BMW 320i, finishing third in the Independents' Trophy, with second overall in the second race at Spa-Francorchamps as his best result. He continued with Proteam in 2006, again finishing third in the Independents' Trophy, with a best overall finish of tenth.

==== Wiechers-Sport (2007) World Independent Trophy Champion ====
For 2007, D'Aste moved to the Wiechers-Sport team, where he won the Yokohama World Independents Trophy in a BMW 320si. His best overall finish was again tenth. He won the gold helmet, one of the most important awards during a racing car drivers career.

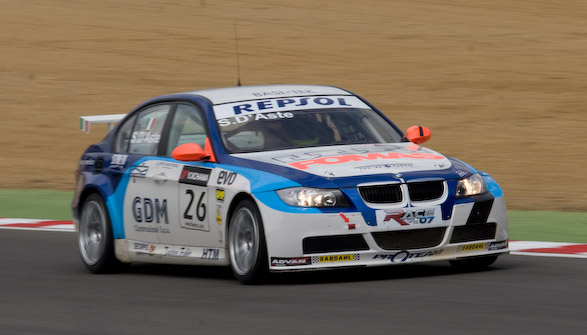
D'Aste driving for Scuderia Proteam Motorsport during the 2008 World Touring Car Championship season, at Brands Hatch.

==== Scuderia Proteam Motorsport (2008) ====
In 2008 he stayed in the WTCC, returning to Proteam Motorsport for his third season at the team. He failed to retain his Independents' crown, finishing third in the final standings. He decided not to attend the final rounds in Macau as a protest at being given a five-place grid penalty after an incident at the previous round in Japan. This was despite being in contention to keep his teammate Sergio Hernández from taking his title.

==== Wiechers-Sport (2009) ====
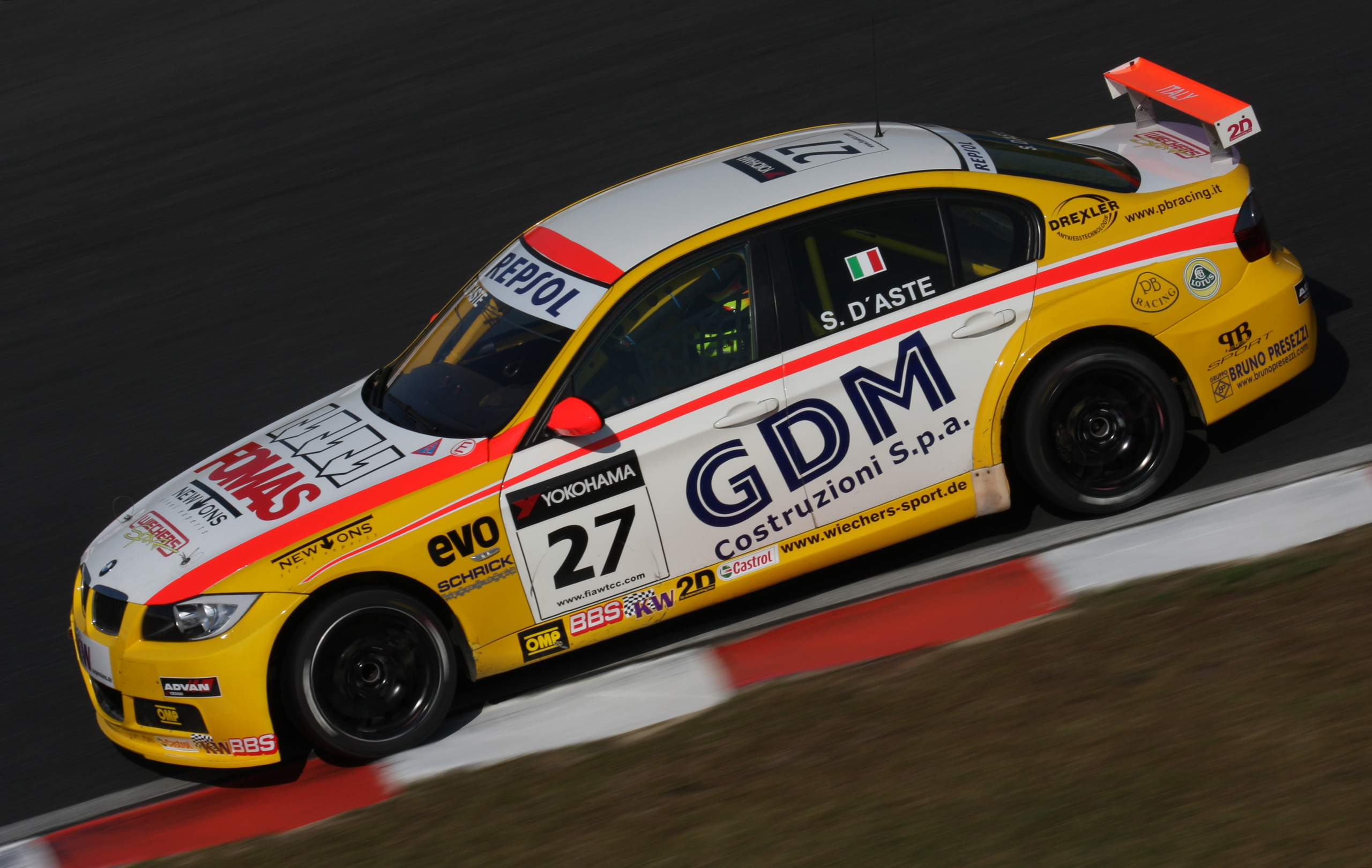
D'Aste competing in the 2009 World Touring Car Championship.

For 2009 D'Aste was due to continue in the WTCC for Proteam, but the deal collapsed and returned instead to Wiechers-Sport. He finished the season nineteenth in the drivers' standings with a best result of sixth at the Race of Germany.

==== Scuderia Proteam Motorsport (2010) ====
In 2010, D'Aste returned for a third stint at Proteam. He elected to again miss the season finale at Macau in order to attend the Monza Rally Show, this despite still being in contention for the Independents' Trophy and leaving teammate Hernandez as Proteam's only title challenger. D'Aste ended the season sixth in the Independents' Trophy and nineteenth in the overall standings with a best finish of ninth at the 2010 FIA WTCC Race of the Czech Republic. At the Rally of Monza, he finished in fourth place overall and first of GT Cars at the wheel of the Lotus Exige GT Rally of PB Racing Team.

==== Wiechers-Sport and Official Lotus Evora GT4 Driver (2011–2012) ====
D'Aste returned to the WTCC midseason in 2011, replacing Urs Sonderegger at Wiechers-Sport from the sixth round in Portugal. He qualified tenth and took the benefit of the race two reversed grid pole position on his first outing under the new qualifying rules. He took the first point of the season for the team in race one but finished out of the points in the second race. D'Aste missed the next round of the WTCC to race in the GT4 European Cup – driving the Official Lotus Evora for Gianni Giudici's eponymous team – but he returned for the rounds at Oschersleben and Valencia. He finished the season 17th in the overall standings, by this time his best finish in the WTCC despite having only competed in three events. He arrived third in the European GT4 serie.

After selected outings in 2011, D'Aste returned to Wiechers-Sport for a full season in 2012. D'Aste took his first overall WTCC win at the Salzburgring, where a series of punctures for the front wheel drive cars allowed him to pass race leader Robert Huff at the last corner. For the fourth time in 2012, he started from the reversed grid pole at Suzuka; he led from start to finish to claim his second win of the season ahead of independent rival Pepe Oriola and Gabriele Tarquini. D'Aste finished on the podium once again at the Race of China, finishing third behind Chevrolet drivers Huff and Menu in race one. He ran as high as second in race two but the drivers' door on his car was stuck open and he dropped down the order. He went to the Race of Macau in contention for the Yokohama Trophy, 15 points behind trophy leader Norbert Michelisz. He qualified behind both his rivals and was then caught up in a pileup at Lisboa corner on the first lap, which caused considerable damage to D'Aste's car and he retired on lap two. Another accident in race two meant he scored no points from the meeting and remained third in the Yokohama Trophy; although 2012 did mark his best placing in the overall championship so far, with seventh place. In 2012 he took part to the first edition of Rally of Sebino at the wheel of Lotus Exige GT Rally and he was the first Driver to win a race overall with a Lotus Exige 2WD competing with S2000 4wd and WRC cars. It was a great result.

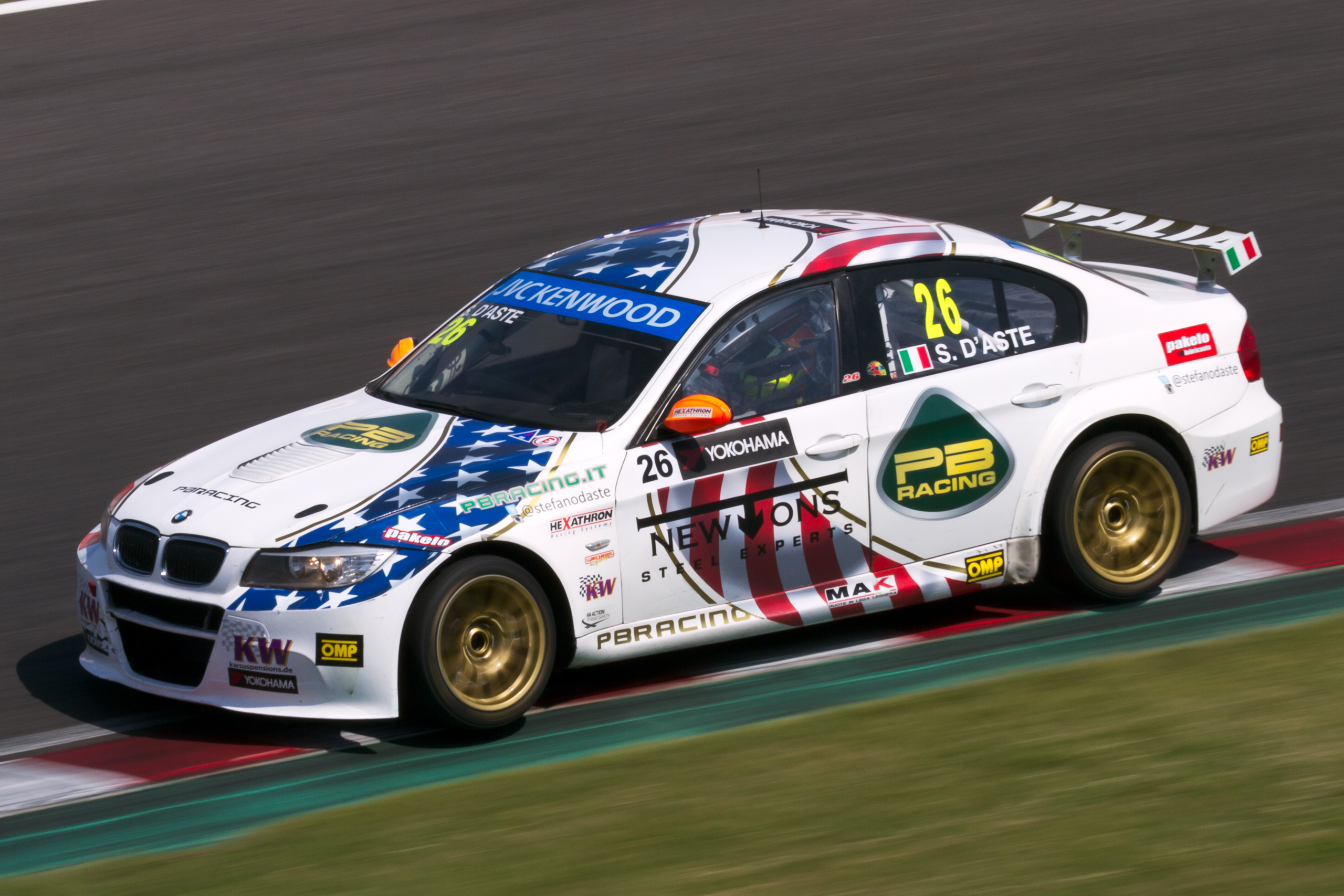
D'Aste competing in the 2013 World Touring Car Championship.

==== PB Racing (2013) ====
D'Aste established his own team called PB Racing for the 2013 season which he would drive a BMW 320 TC for. He crashed out of the first race of the Race of Italy when he spun on the exit of Ascari on lap four and hit the barriers, skating over the track and then hitting the barriers on the other side before coming to a halt. He started race 2 from the back of the grid, but finished in ninth.

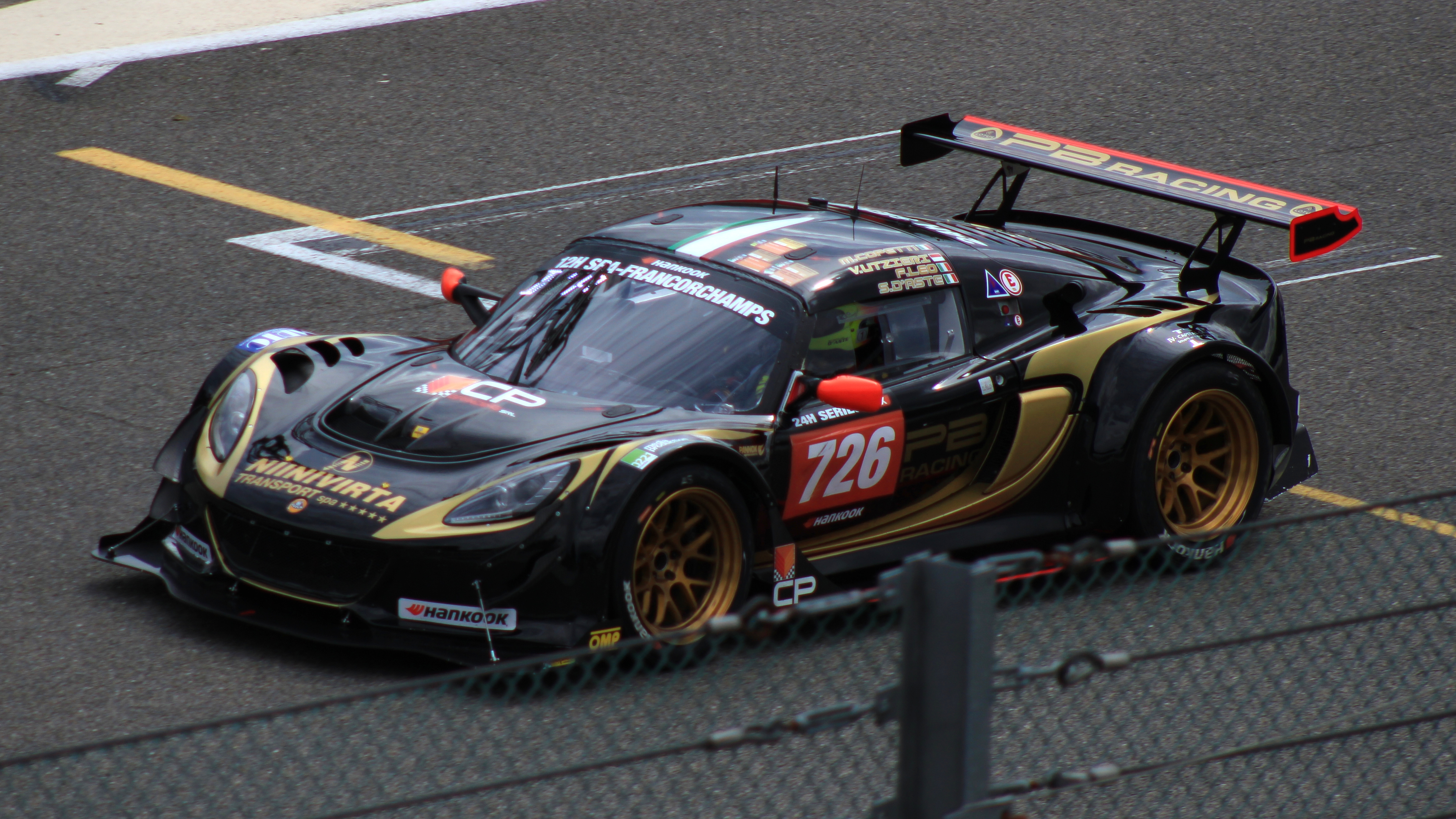
D'Aste's PB Racing Lotus Exige V6 Cup R competing in the 24H Series.

== Racing record ==
=== Complete European Touring Car Championship results ===
(key) (Races in bold indicate pole position) (Races in italics indicate fastest lap)

Year	Team	Car	1	2	3	4	5	6	7	8	9	10	11	12	13	14	15	16	17	18	19	20	DC	Points
2004	Proteam Motorsport	BMW 320i	MNZ; 1; 13	MNZ; 2; 8	VAL; 1; 14	VAL; 2; 12	MAG; 1; 10	MAG; 2; 9	HOC; 1; 16	HOC; 2 DNS	BRN; 1; 16	BRN; 2; 14	DON; 1; 16	DON; 2 Ret	SPA; 1 Ret	SPA; 2 DNS	IMO; 1; 15	IMO; 2 Ret	OSC; 1	OSC; 2	DUB; 1	DUB; 2	20th	1

=== Complete World Touring Car Championship results ===
(key) (Races in bold indicate pole position) (Races in italics indicate fastest lap)

Year	Team	Car	1	2	3	4	5	6	7	8	9	10	11	12	13	14	15	16	17	18	19	20	21	22	23	24	DC	Points
2005	Proteam Motorsport	BMW 320i	ITA; 1; 16	ITA; 2; 22	FRA; 1 Ret	FRA; 2 DNS	GBR; 1 Ret	GBR; 2 Ret	SMR; 1; 22	SMR; 2; 15	MEX; 1; 12	MEX; 2; 11	BEL; 1; 16	BEL; 2; 2	GER; 1; 20	GER; 2; 19	TUR; 1; 14	TUR; 2; 15	ESP; 1; 17	ESP; 2; 17	MAC; 1; 11	MAC; 2 Ret					18th	8
2006	Proteam Motorsport	BMW 320i	ITA; 1; 14	ITA; 2; 21	FRA; 1; 18	FRA; 2; 10	GBR; 1; 19	GBR; 2 Ret	GER; 1; 19	GER; 2; 19	BRA; 1 Ret	BRA; 2 Ret	MEX; 1; 22	MEX; 2 Ret	CZE; 1; 13	CZE; 2; 11	TUR; 1; 12	TUR; 2; 11	ESP; 1; 20	ESP; 2; 19	MAC; 1 Ret	MAC; 2; 11					NC	0
2007	Wiechers-Sport	BMW 320si	BRA; 1; 11	BRA; 2; 13	NED; 1; 17	NED; 2; 18	ESP; 1; 12	ESP; 2; 18	FRA; 1; 13	FRA; 2 Ret	CZE; 1; 14	CZE; 2; 10	POR; 1; 11	POR; 2; 14	SWE; 1; 21	SWE; 2; 19	GER; 1; 17	GER; 2; 13	GBR; 1; 17	GBR; 2; 17	ITA; 1; 21	ITA; 2; 10	MAC; 1; 18	MAC; 2; 12			NC	0
2008	Scuderia Proteam Motorsport	BMW 320si	BRA; 1; 9	BRA; 2; 16	MEX; 1; 13	MEX; 2; 14	ESP; 1; 14	ESP; 2; 15	FRA; 1; 18	FRA; 2; 14	CZE; 1; 25	CZE; 2; 21	POR; 1; 19	POR; 2; 16	GBR; 1; 12	GBR; 2; 7	GER; 1; 9	GER; 2; 13	EUR; 1; 18	EUR; 2; 16	ITA; 1; 24	ITA; 2; 14	JPN; 1; 9	JPN; 2; 23	MAC; 1	MAC; 2	18th	2
2009	Wiechers-Sport	BMW 320si	BRA; 1 Ret	BRA; 2; 20	MEX; 1; 12	MEX; 2; 16	MAR; 1; 16	MAR; 2; 13	FRA; 1 Ret	FRA; 2 DNS	ESP; 1; 9	ESP; 2; 9	CZE; 1; 17	CZE; 2; 15	POR; 1; 10	POR; 2; 9	GBR; 1; 9	GBR; 2; 13	GER; 1; 6	GER; 1; 16	ITA; 1; 12	ITA; 2; 10	JPN; 1; 24	JPN; 2; 10	MAC; 1 DNS	MAC; 2 DNS	18th	3
2010	Scuderia Proteam Motorsport	BMW 320si	BRA; 1; 17	BRA; 1; 15	MAR; 1 Ret	MAR; 2; 11	ITA; 1; 11	ITA; 2; 11	BEL; 1; 16	BEL; 2; 13	POR; 1; 14	POR; 1; 13	GBR; 1; 18	GBR; 2; 11	CZE; 1; 10	CZE; 2; 9	GER; 1; 15	GER; 2; 16	ESP; 1 Ret	ESP; 2 DNS	JPN; 1 Ret	JPN; 2; 17	MAC; 1	MAC; 2			19th	3
2011	Wiechers-Sport	BMW 320 TC	BRA; 1	BRA; 2	BEL; 1	BEL; 2	ITA; 1	ITA; 2	HUN; 1	HUN; 2	CZE; 1	CZE; 2	POR; 1; 10	**POR**; **2**; 11	GBR; 1	GBR; 2	GER; 1; 6	GER; 2; 9	ESP; 2; 10	ESP; 2; 11	JPN; 1	JPN; 2	CHN; 1	CHN; 2	MAC; 1	MAC; 2	17th	12
2012	Wiechers-Sport	BMW 320 TC	ITA; 1; 11	ITA; 2; 5	ESP; 1; 11	**ESP**; **2**; 3	MAR; 1; 5	MAR; 2; 5	SVK; 1; 5	**SVK**; **2**; 14	HUN; 1; 17	HUN; 2; 8	AUT; 1 Ret	AUT; 2; 1	POR; 1; 11	POR; 2; 18	BRA; 1; 17	BRA; 2; 13	USA; 1; 9	**USA**; **2**; 9	JPN; 1; 8	**JPN**; **2**; 1	CHN; 1; 3	CHN; 2; 4	MAC; 1 Ret	MAC; 2; 23	7th	144
2013	PB Racing	BMW 320 TC	ITA; 1 Ret	ITA; 2; 9	MAR; 1 Ret	MAR; 2; 14	SVK; 1; 12	SVK; 2; 11	HUN; 1; 14	HUN; 2; 11	AUT; 1; 15	AUT; 2 DNS	RUS; 1; 10	RUS; 2; 8	POR; 1; 8	POR; 2; 12	ARG; 1; 14	ARG; 2; 10	USA; 1; 10	USA; 2; 10	JPN; 1; 29	JPN; 2; 9	CHN; 1; 28	CHN; 2; 9	MAC; 1; 9	MAC; 2 Ret	16th	22
2015	ALL–INKL.COM Münnich Motorsport	Chevrolet RML Cruze TC1	ARG; 1; 9	ARG; 2 Ret	MAR; 1; 9	MAR; 2; 6	HUN; 1; 14	HUN; 2; 12	GER; 1; 8	GER; 2 Ret	RUS; 1; 16	RUS; 2; 14	SVK; 1; 11	SVK; 2; 12	FRA; 1; 14	FRA; 2; 15†	POR; 1; 13	POR; 2 Ret	JPN; 1; 14	JPN; 2; 9	CHN; 1; 9	CHN; 2; 13†	THA; 1; 8	THA; 2; 8	QAT; 1; 17	QAT; 2 Ret	14th	28

^{†} Driver did not finish the race, but was classified as he completed over 75% of the race distance.

Sporting positions
Preceded by Tom Coronel	World Touring Car Championship; Independents' Trophy winner 2007	Succeeded by Sergio Hernández
