= 2005 FIA WTCC Race of Spain =

2005 Race of Spain
Race details
- Round 9 of 10 in the 2005 World Touring Car Championship at Circuit Ricardo Tormo in Valencia, Spain.
- Date: October 2, 2005
- Location: Valencia, Spain
- Course: Circuit Ricardo Tormo; 4.005 kilometres (2.489 mi)

Race One
- Laps: 13
Pole position
Driver		(Spain) Jordi Gené	SEAT Sport
Time		1:42.778	
Podium
First		(Spain) Jordi Gené	SEAT Sport
Second		(Germany) Dirk Müller	BMW Team Deutschland
Third		(Germany) Peter Terting	SEAT Sport
Fastest Lap
Driver		(Germany) Dirk Müller	BMW Team Deutschland
Time		1:43.795	

Race Two
- Laps: 13
Podium
First		(Germany) Jörg Müller	BMW Team Deutschland
Second		(Italy) Fabrizio Giovanardi	Alfa Romeo Racing Team
Third		(United Kingdom) Andy Priaulx	BMW Team UK
Fastest Lap
Driver		(Germany) Jörg Müller	BMW Team Deutschland
Time		1:43.948	

The 2005 FIA WTCC Race Of Spain was the ninth and penultimate round of the 2005 World Touring Car Championship season. It was held at the Circuit Ricardo Tormo. Jordi Gené won the first race for SEAT, this being SEAT's third win and the first for the new SEAT León in WTCC. The second race was dominated by Jörg Müller, whose win for BMW helped them to close in on the Manufacturers Championship.

== Race 1 ==
Pos	No		Driver	Team	Car	Laps	Time/Retired	Grid	Points
1	9		(Spain) Jordi Gené	SEAT Sport	SEAT León	13	22:48.757	1	10
2	43		(Germany) Dirk Müller	BMW Team Deutschland	BMW 320i	13	+3.288	3	8
3	10		(Germany) Peter Terting	SEAT Sport	SEAT León	13	+7.099	2	6
4	1		(United Kingdom) Andy Priaulx	BMW Team UK	BMW 320i	13	+8.417	14	5
5	42		(Germany) Jörg Müller	BMW Team Deutschland	BMW 320i	13	+10.908	7	4
6	6		(Italy) Fabrizio Giovanardi	Alfa Romeo Racing Team	Alfa Romeo 156	13	+15.506	12	3
7	22		(Italy) Nicola Larini	Chevrolet	Chevrolet Lacetti	13	+19.414	10	2
8	4		(Italy) Alex Zanardi	BMW Team Italy-Spain	BMW 320i	13	+19.937	20	1
9	29		(Monaco) Stéphane Ortelli	Team Oreca PlayStation	SEAT Toledo Cupra	13	+25.285	13	
10	12		(Spain) Marc Carol	SEAT Sport	SEAT Toledo Cupra	13	+26.214	18	
11	27	IT	(Italy) Adriano de Micheli	JAS Motorsport	Honda Accord Euro R	13	+28.953	15	
12	31	IT	(Italy) Giuseppe Cirò	Proteam Motorsport	BMW 320i	13	+31.876	26	
13	34	IT	(Sweden) Tomas Engström	Honda Dealer Team Sweden	Honda Accord Euro R	13	+32.654	22	
14	5		(Spain) Antonio García	BMW Team Italy-Spain	BMW 320i	13	+42.753	9	
15	40	IT	(Spain) Polo Villaamil	GR Asia	SEAT Toledo Cupra	13	+45.121	27	
16	2		(Italy) Gabriele Tarquini	Alfa Romeo Racing Team	Alfa Romeo 156	13	+53.181	8	
17	30	IT	(Italy) Stefano D'Aste	Proteam Motorsport	BMW 320i	12	+1 Lap	24	
NC	7		(Brazil) Augusto Farfus	Alfa Romeo Racing Team	Alfa Romeo 156	8	+5 Laps	6	
NC	20	IT	(Netherlands) Tom Coronel	GR Asia	SEAT Toledo Cupra	8	+5 Laps	21	
Ret	8		(Sweden) Rickard Rydell	SEAT Sport	SEAT León	5	Retirement	5	
Ret	28	IT	(Sweden) Carl Rosenblad	Crawford Racing	BMW 320i	3	Accident	16	
Ret	23		(Switzerland) Alain Menu	Chevrolet	Chevrolet Lacetti	3	Retirement	11	
Ret	3		(United Kingdom) James Thompson	Alfa Romeo Racing Team	Alfa Romeo 156	1	Collision	23	
Ret	14		(Germany) Thomas Klenke	Ford Hotfiel Sport	Ford Focus	1	Collision	17	
Ret	16		(Germany) Michael Funke	Ford Hotfiel Sport	Ford Focus	1	Collision	19	
Ret	32	IT	(Germany) Marc Hennerici	Wiechers-Sport	BMW 320i	1	Collision	25	
Ret	21		(United Kingdom) Robert Huff	Chevrolet	Chevrolet Lacetti	0	Collision	4	

== Race 2 ==
Pos	No		Driver	Team	Car	Laps	Time/Retired	Grid	Points
1	42		(Germany) Jörg Müller	BMW Team Deutschland	BMW 320i	13	23:00.510	4	10
2	6		(Italy) Fabrizio Giovanardi	Alfa Romeo Racing Team	Alfa Romeo 156	13	+7.760	3	8
3	1		(United Kingdom) Andy Priaulx	BMW Team UK	BMW 320i	13	+8.245	5	6
4	43		(Germany) Dirk Müller	BMW Team Deutschland	BMW 320i	13	+8.480	7	5
5	4		(Italy) Alex Zanardi	BMW Team Italy-Spain	BMW 320i	13	+9.166	1	4
6	5		(Spain) Antonio García	BMW Team Italy-Spain	BMW 320i	13	+9.304	14	3
7	7		(Brazil) Augusto Farfus	Alfa Romeo Racing Team	Alfa Romeo 156	13	+9.806	18	2
8	12		(Spain) Marc Carol	SEAT Sport	SEAT Toledo Cupra	13	+11.123	10	1
9	34	IT	(Sweden) Tomas Engström	Honda Dealer Team Sweden	Honda Accord Euro R	13	+14.798	13	
10	31	IT	(Italy) Giuseppe Cirò	Proteam Motorsport	BMW 320i	13	+15.023	12	
11	8		(Sweden) Rickard Rydell	SEAT Sport	SEAT León	13	+15.653	24	
12	10		(Germany) Peter Terting	SEAT Sport	SEAT León	13	+17.125	6	
13	20	IT	(Netherlands) Tom Coronel	GR Asia	SEAT Toledo Cupra	13	+17.227	19	
14	9		(Spain) Jordi Gené	SEAT Sport	SEAT León	13	+18.059	8	
15	3		(United Kingdom) James Thompson	Alfa Romeo Racing Team	Alfa Romeo 156	13	+21.765	20	
16	28	IT	(Sweden) Carl Rosenblad	Crawford Racing	BMW 320i	13	+24.145	26	
17	30	IT	(Italy) Stefano D'Aste	Proteam Motorsport	BMW 320i	13	+26.045	17	
18	16		(Germany) Michael Funke	Ford Hotfiel Sport	Ford Focus	13	+30.084	22	
19	27	IT	(Italy) Adriano de Micheli	JAS Motorsport	Honda Accord Euro R	13	+43.253	11	
20	32	IT	(Germany) Marc Hennerici	Wiechers-Sport	BMW 320i	13	+44.657	27	
21	40	IT	(Spain) Polo Villaamil	GR Asia	SEAT Toledo Cupra	13	+1:07.495	15	
22	29		(Monaco) Stéphane Ortelli	Team Oreca PlayStation	SEAT Toledo Cupra	12	+1 Lap	9	
23	2		(Italy) Gabriele Tarquini	Alfa Romeo Racing Team	Alfa Romeo 156	9	+4 Laps	16	
Ret	22		(Italy) Nicola Larini	Chevrolet	Chevrolet Lacetti	2	Retirement	2	
DNS	14		(Germany) Thomas Klenke	Ford Hotfiel Sport	Ford Focus	0		21	
DNS	21		(United Kingdom) Robert Huff	Chevrolet	Chevrolet Lacetti	0		23	
DNS	23		(Switzerland) Alain Menu	Chevrolet	Chevrolet Lacetti	0		25	

== Standings after the races ==
Drivers' Championship standings

Pos	Driver	Points
1	(Germany) Dirk Müller	86
2	(United Kingdom) Andy Priaulx	85
3	(Italy) Fabrizio Giovanardi	81
4	(Germany) Jörg Müller	59
5	(Italy) Gabriele Tarquini	55

Manufacturers' Championship standings

Pos	Constructor	Points
1	(Germany) BMW	244
2	(Italy) Alfa Romeo	219
3	(Spain) SEAT	170
4	(United States) Chevrolet	57
5	(United States) Ford	10
