= 2005 FIA WTCC Race of Belgium =

2005 Race of Belgium
Race details
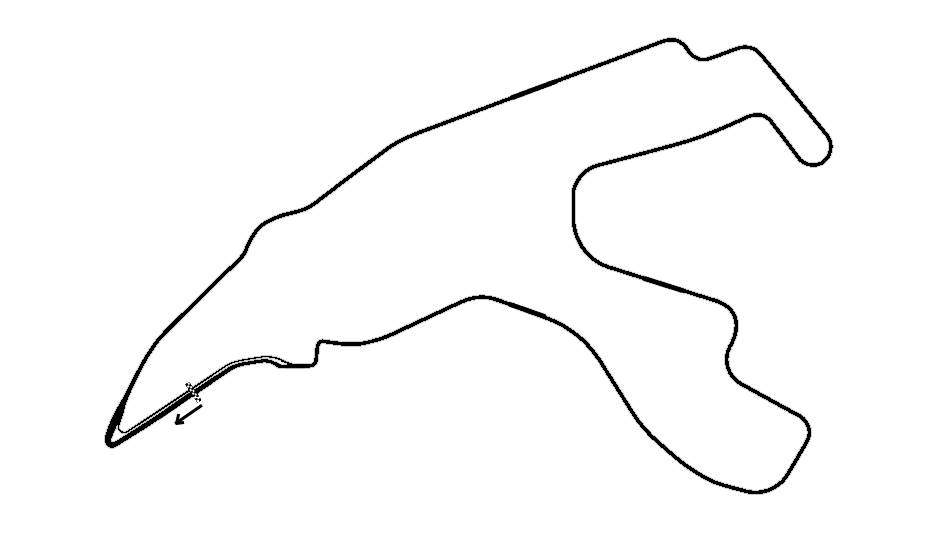
- Round 6 of 10 in the 2005 World Touring Car Championship at Circuit de Spa-Francorchamps in Spa, Belgium.
- Date: July 30, 2005
- Location: Spa, Belgium
- Course: Circuit de Spa-Francorchamps; 7.004 kilometres (4.352 mi)

Race One
- Laps: 8
Pole position
Driver		(Brazil) Augusto Farfus	Alfa Romeo Racing Team
Time		2:33.158	
Podium
First		(Germany) Dirk Müller	BMW Team Deutschland
Second		(United Kingdom) Andy Priaulx	BMW Team UK
Third		(Germany) Jörg Müller	BMW Team Deutschland
Fastest Lap
Driver		(Germany) Dirk Müller	BMW Team Deutschland
Time		2:33.955	

Race Two
- Laps: 8
Podium
First		(Italy) Fabrizio Giovanardi	Alfa Romeo Racing Team
Second		(Italy) Stefano D'Aste	Proteam Motorsport
Third		(Netherlands) Tom Coronel	GR Asia
Fastest Lap
Driver		(Brazil) Augusto Farfus	Alfa Romeo Racing Team
Time		2:42.690	

The 2005 FIA WTCC Race Of Belgium was the sixth round of the 2005 World Touring Car Championship season. It was held at the Circuit de Spa-Francorchamps. Dirk Müller won the first race in a BMW 1-2-3 podium sweep, and also extended his points lead, whereas Fabrizio Giovanardi won a wet and crash-strewn second race from pole on the reversed grid for Alfa Romeo.

== Race 1 ==
Pos	No		Driver	Team	Car	Laps	Time/Retired	Grid	Points
1	43		(Germany) Dirk Müller	BMW Team Deutschland	BMW 320i	8	22:58.706	4	10
2	1		(United Kingdom) Andy Priaulx	BMW Team UK	BMW 320i	8	+0.270	2	8
3	42		(Germany) Jörg Müller	BMW Team Deutschland	BMW 320i	8	+5.448	3	6
4	2		(Italy) Gabriele Tarquini	Alfa Romeo Racing Team	Alfa Romeo 156	8	+5.712	6	5
5	3		(United Kingdom) James Thompson	Alfa Romeo Racing Team	Alfa Romeo 156	8	+5.859	8	4
6	5		(Spain) Antonio García	BMW Team Italy-Spain	BMW 320i	8	+10.694	13	3
7	6		(Italy) Fabrizio Giovanardi	Alfa Romeo Racing Team	Alfa Romeo 156	8	+11.297	10	2
8	26		(Italy) Roberto Colciago	JAS Motorsport	Honda Accord Euro R	8	+11.495	7	1
9	11		(United Kingdom) Jason Plato	SEAT Sport	SEAT Toledo Cupra	8	+11.566	11	
10	10		(Germany) Peter Terting	SEAT Sport	SEAT Toledo Cupra	8	+11.965	12	
11	8		(Sweden) Rickard Rydell	SEAT Sport	SEAT Toledo Cupra	8	+14.273	9	
12	9		(Spain) Jordi Gené	SEAT Sport	SEAT Toledo Cupra	8	+15.697	5	
13	20	IT	(Netherlands) Tom Coronel	GR Asia	SEAT Toledo Cupra	8	+16.329	14	
14	23		(Switzerland) Alain Menu	Chevrolet	Chevrolet Lacetti	8	+18.058	17	
15	31	IT	(Italy) Giuseppe Cirò	Proteam Motorsport	BMW 320i	8	+23.145	23	
16	30	IT	(Italy) Stefano D'Aste	Proteam Motorsport	BMW 320i	8	+23.655	15	
17	22		(Italy) Nicola Larini	Chevrolet	Chevrolet Lacetti	8	+24.208	20	
18	32	IT	(Germany) Marc Hennerici	Wiechers-Sport	BMW 320i	8	+26.567	22	
19	18	IT	(Finland) Valle Mäkelä	GR Asia	SEAT Toledo Cupra	8	+27.660	18	
20	33	IT	(Czech Republic) Adam Lacko	IEP Team	BMW 320i	8	+29.982	21	
21	14		(Germany) Thomas Klenke	Ford Hotfiel Sport	Ford Focus	8	+30.119	25	
22	28	IT	(Sweden) Carl Rosenblad	Crawford Racing	BMW 320i	8	+30.841	16	
23	24	IT	(France) Soheil Ayari	Peugeot Sport Denmark	Peugeot 407	8	+1:06.782	26	
Ret	21		(United Kingdom) Robert Huff	Chevrolet	Chevrolet Lacetti	4	Retirement	19	
Ret	16		(Germany) Michael Funke	Ford Hotfiel Sport	Ford Focus	0	Collision	24	
DSQ	7		(Brazil) Augusto Farfus	Alfa Romeo Racing Team	Alfa Romeo 156	8	Disqualified	1	
WD	4		(Italy) Alex Zanardi	BMW Team Italy-Spain	BMW 320i	0	Withdrew		

== Race 2 ==
Pos	No		Driver	Team	Car	Laps	Time/Retired	Grid	Points
1	6		(Italy) Fabrizio Giovanardi	Alfa Romeo Racing Team	Alfa Romeo 156	8	27:49.757	1	10
2	30	IT	(Italy) Stefano D'Aste	Proteam Motorsport	BMW 320i	8	+0.003	17	8
3	20	IT	(Netherlands) Tom Coronel	GR Asia	SEAT Toledo Cupra	8	+1.371	14	6
4	7		(Brazil) Augusto Farfus	Alfa Romeo Racing Team	Alfa Romeo 156	8	+1.923	5	5
5	43		(Germany) Dirk Müller	BMW Team Deutschland	BMW 320i	8	+4.050	8	4
6	23		(Switzerland) Alain Menu	Chevrolet	Chevrolet Lacetti	8	+7.619	15	3
7	3		(United Kingdom) James Thompson	Alfa Romeo Racing Team	Alfa Romeo 156	8	+9.807	3	2
8	5		(Spain) Antonio García	BMW Team Italy-Spain	BMW 320i	8	+10.069	2	1
9	32	IT	(Germany) Marc Hennerici	Wiechers-Sport	BMW 320i	8	+10.578	19	
10	10		(Germany) Peter Terting	SEAT Sport	SEAT Toledo Cupra	8	+14.206	13	
11	21		(United Kingdom) Robert Huff	Chevrolet	Chevrolet Lacetti	8	+14.609	24	
12	28	IT	(Sweden) Carl Rosenblad	Crawford Racing	BMW 320i	8	+15.208	26	
13	33	IT	(Czech Republic) Adam Lacko	IEP Team	BMW 320i	8	+15.634	21	
14	11		(United Kingdom) Jason Plato	SEAT Sport	SEAT Toledo Cupra	8	+17.597	10	
15	31	IT	(Italy) Giuseppe Cirò	Proteam Motorsport	BMW 320i	8	+18.705	16	
16	42		(Germany) Jörg Müller	BMW Team Deutschland	BMW 320i	8	+43.977	6	
17	2		(Italy) Gabriele Tarquini	Alfa Romeo Racing Team	Alfa Romeo 156	7	+1 Lap	4	
18	22		(Italy) Nicola Larini	Chevrolet	Chevrolet Lacetti	7	+1 Lap	18	
Ret	26		(Italy) Roberto Colciago	JAS Motorsport	Honda Accord Euro R	4	Accident	9	
Ret	9		(Spain) Jordi Gené	SEAT Sport	SEAT Toledo Cupra	3	Collision	13	
Ret	14		(Germany) Thomas Klenke	Ford Hotfiel Sport	Ford Focus	3	Collision	22	
Ret	18	IT	(Finland) Valle Mäkelä	GR Asia	SEAT Toledo Cupra	1	Retirement	20	
Ret	1		(United Kingdom) Andy Priaulx	BMW Team UK	BMW 320i	0	Collision	7	
Ret	8		(Sweden) Rickard Rydell	SEAT Sport	SEAT Toledo Cupra	0	Collision	12	
Ret	24	IT	(France) Soheil Ayari	Peugeot Sport Denmark	Peugeot 407	0	Retirement	23	
DNS	16		(Germany) Michael Funke	Ford Hotfiel Sport	Ford Focus	0		25	
WD	4		(Italy) Alex Zanardi	BMW Team Italy-Spain	BMW 320i	0	Withdrew		

== Standings after the races ==
Drivers' Championship standings

Pos	Driver	Points
1	(Germany) Dirk Müller	61
2	(Italy) Fabrizio Giovanardi	57
3	(United Kingdom) Andy Priaulx	50
4	(Italy) Gabriele Tarquini	43
5	(Spain) Antonio García	43

Manufacturers' Championship standings

Pos	Constructor	Points
1	(Germany) BMW	159
2	(Italy) Alfa Romeo	155
3	(Spain) SEAT	113
4	(United States) Chevrolet	39
5	(United States) Ford	2
