= 2005 FIA WTCC Race of Turkey =

2005 Race of Turkey
Race details
- Round 8 of 10 in the 2005 World Touring Car Championship at Istanbul Park in Istanbul, Turkey.
- Date: September 18, 2005
- Location: Istanbul, Turkey
- Course: Istanbul Park; 5.338 kilometres (3.317 mi)

Race One
- Laps: 10
Pole position
| Driver | | (Italy) Gabriele Tarquini | Alfa Romeo Racing Team |
| Time | | 2:04.525 | |
Podium
| First | | (Italy) Fabrizio Giovanardi | Alfa Romeo Racing Team |
| Second | | (United Kingdom) James Thompson | Alfa Romeo Racing Team |
| Third | | (United Kingdom) Andy Priaulx | BMW Team UK |
Fastest Lap
| Driver | | (United Kingdom) James Thompson | Alfa Romeo Racing Team |
| Time | | 2:05.942 | |

Race Two
- Laps: 10
Podium
| First | | (Italy) Gabriele Tarquini | Alfa Romeo Racing Team |
| Second | | (Brazil) Augusto Farfus | Alfa Romeo Racing Team |
| Third | | (Italy) Alex Zanardi | BMW Team Italy-Spain |
Fastest Lap
| Driver | | (Italy) Gabriele Tarquini | Alfa Romeo Racing Team |
| Time | | 2:05.771 | |

The 2005 FIA WTCC Race Of Turkey was the eighth round of the 2005 World Touring Car Championship season. It was held at Istanbul Park. The first race was won by Fabrizio Giovanardi in an Alfa Romeo 1-2. Alfa Romeo finished 1-2 in the second race also, with Gabriele Tarquini emerging the victor.

== Race 1 ==
| Pos | No | | Driver | Team | Car | Laps | Time/Retired | Grid | Points |
|---|---|---|---|---|---|---|---|---|---|
| 1 | 6 | | (Italy) Fabrizio Giovanardi | Alfa Romeo Racing Team | Alfa Romeo 156 | 10 | 21:12.294 | 4 | 10 |
| 2 | 3 | | (United Kingdom) James Thompson | Alfa Romeo Racing Team | Alfa Romeo 156 | 10 | +2.794 | 2 | 8 |
| 3 | 1 | | (United Kingdom) Andy Priaulx | BMW Team UK | BMW 320i | 10 | +6.134 | 7 | 6 |
| 4 | 5 | | (Spain) Antonio García | BMW Team Italy-Spain | BMW 320i | 10 | +6.893 | 13 | 5 |
| 5 | 8 | | (Sweden) Rickard Rydell | SEAT Sport | SEAT Toledo Cupra | 10 | +8.018 | 9 | 4 |
| 6 | 4 | | (Italy) Alex Zanardi | BMW Team Italy-Spain | BMW 320i | 10 | +9.593 | 15 | 3 |
| 7 | 2 | | (Italy) Gabriele Tarquini | Alfa Romeo Racing Team | Alfa Romeo 156 | 10 | +14.495 | 1 | 2 |
| 8 | 7 | | (Brazil) Augusto Farfus | Alfa Romeo Racing Team | Alfa Romeo 156 | 10 | +19.711 | 3 | 1 |
| 9 | 43 | | (Germany) Dirk Müller | BMW Team Deutschland | BMW 320i | 10 | +20.198 | 10 | |
| 10 | 23 | | (Switzerland) Alain Menu | Chevrolet | Chevrolet Lacetti | 10 | +22.805 | 14 | |
| 11 | 28 | IT | (Sweden) Carl Rosenblad | Crawford Racing | BMW 320i | 10 | +24.626 | 16 | |
| 12 | 31 | IT | (Italy) Giuseppe Cirò | Proteam Motorsport | BMW 320i | 10 | +28.694 | 21 | |
| 13 | 32 | IT | (Germany) Marc Hennerici | Wiechers-Sport | BMW 320i | 10 | +32.866 | 16 | |
| 14 | 30 | IT | (Italy) Stefano D'Aste | Proteam Motorsport | BMW 320i | 10 | +33.848 | 20 | |
| 15 | 27 | IT | (Italy) Adriano de Micheli | JAS Motorsport | Honda Accord Euro R | 10 | +34.112 | 11 | |
| 16 | 21 | | (United Kingdom) Robert Huff | Chevrolet | Chevrolet Lacetti | 10 | +34.470 | 24 | |
| 17 | 9 | | (Spain) Jordi Gené | SEAT Sport | SEAT León | 10 | +34.584 | 8 | |
| Ret | 38 | IT | (Turkey) Erkut Kizilirmak | GR Asia | SEAT Toledo Cupra | 6 | Engine | 22 | |
| NC | 22 | | (Italy) Nicola Larini | Chevrolet | Chevrolet Lacetti | 6 | +4 Laps | 12 | |
| Ret | 20 | IT | (Netherlands) Tom Coronel | GR Asia | SEAT Toledo Cupra | 5 | Engine | 25 | |
| Ret | 29 | | (Monaco) Stéphane Ortelli | Team Oreca PlayStation | SEAT Toledo Cupra | 5 | Damage | 5 | |
| NC | 10 | | (Germany) Peter Terting | SEAT Sport | SEAT Toledo Cupra | 5 | +5 Laps | 6 | |
| Ret | 42 | | (Germany) Jörg Müller | BMW Team Deutschland | BMW 320i | 4 | Collision | 23 | |
| Ret | 16 | | (Germany) Michael Funke | Ford Hotfiel Sport | Ford Focus | 2 | Retirement | 18 | |
| Ret | 14 | | (Germany) Thomas Klenke | Ford Hotfiel Sport | Ford Focus | 1 | Accident | 19 | |

== Race 2 ==
| Pos | No | | Driver | Team | Car | Laps | Time/Retired | Grid | Points |
|---|---|---|---|---|---|---|---|---|---|
| 1 | 2 | | (Italy) Gabriele Tarquini | Alfa Romeo Racing Team | Alfa Romeo 156 | 10 | 21:07.765 | 2 | 10 |
| 2 | 7 | | (Brazil) Augusto Farfus | Alfa Romeo Racing Team | Alfa Romeo 156 | 10 | +0.263 | 1 | 8 |
| 3 | 4 | | (Italy) Alex Zanardi | BMW Team Italy-Spain | BMW 320i | 10 | +1.103 | 3 | 3 |
| 4 | 3 | | (United Kingdom) James Thompson | Alfa Romeo Racing Team | Alfa Romeo 156 | 10 | +4.538 | 7 | 5 |
| 5 | 43 | | (Germany) Dirk Müller | BMW Team Deutschland | BMW 320i | 10 | +5.423 | 9 | 4 |
| 6 | 6 | | (Italy) Fabrizio Giovanardi | Alfa Romeo Racing Team | Alfa Romeo 156 | 10 | +9.364 | 8 | 3 |
| 7 | 8 | | (Sweden) Rickard Rydell | SEAT Sport | SEAT Toledo Cupra | 10 | +11.408 | 4 | 2 |
| 8 | 23 | | (Switzerland) Alain Menu | Chevrolet | Chevrolet Lacetti | 10 | +11.537 | 10 | 1 |
| 9 | 1 | | (United Kingdom) Andy Priaulx | BMW Team UK | BMW 320i | 10 | +13.907 | 6 | |
| 10 | 10 | | (Germany) Peter Terting | SEAT Sport | SEAT Toledo Cupra | 10 | +15.089 | 21 | |
| 11 | 32 | IT | (Germany) Marc Hennerici | Wiechers-Sport | BMW 320i | 10 | +15.480 | 13 | |
| 12 | 42 | | (Germany) Jörg Müller | BMW Team Deutschland | BMW 320i | 10 | +15.846 | 25 | |
| 13 | 21 | | (United Kingdom) Robert Huff | Chevrolet | Chevrolet Lacetti | 10 | +17.852 | 16 | |
| 14 | 31 | IT | (Italy) Giuseppe Cirò | Proteam Motorsport | BMW 320i | 10 | +21.852 | 12 | |
| 15 | 30 | IT | (Italy) Stefano D'Aste | Proteam Motorsport | BMW 320i | 10 | +24.183 | 14 | |
| 16 | 27 | IT | (Italy) Adriano de Micheli | JAS Motorsport | Honda Accord Euro R | 10 | +25.278 | 15 | |
| 17 | 14 | | (Germany) Thomas Klenke | Ford Hotfiel Sport | Ford Focus | 10 | +31.152 | 23 | |
| 18 | 28 | IT | (Sweden) Carl Rosenblad | Crawford Racing | BMW 320i | 10 | +38.780 | 11 | |
| Ret | 9 | | (Spain) Jordi Gené | SEAT Sport | SEAT León | 4 | Retirement | 17 | |
| Ret | 22 | | (Italy) Nicola Larini | Chevrolet | Chevrolet Lacetti | 4 | Accident | 19 | |
| Ret | 29 | | (Monaco) Stéphane Ortelli | Team Oreca PlayStation | SEAT Toledo Cupra | 3 | Retirement | 24 | |
| Ret | 5 | | (Spain) Antonio García | BMW Team Italy-Spain | BMW 320i | 2 | Collision | 5 | |
| DNS | 38 | IT | (Turkey) Erkut Kizilirmak | GR Asia | SEAT Toledo Cupra | 0 | | 18 | |
| DNS | 20 | IT | (Netherlands) Tom Coronel | GR Asia | SEAT Toledo Cupra | 0 | | 20 | |
| DNS | 16 | | (Germany) Michael Funke | Ford Hotfiel Sport | Ford Focus | 0 | | 22 | |

== Standings after the races ==
Drivers' Championship standings

| Pos | Driver | Points |
|---|---|---|
| 1 | (United Kingdom) Andy Priaulx | 74 |
| 2 | (Germany) Dirk Müller | 73 |
| 3 | (Italy) Fabrizio Giovanardi | 70 |
| 4 | (Italy) Gabriele Tarquini | 55 |
| 5 | (United Kingdom) James Thompson | 51 |

Manufacturers' Championship standings

| Pos | Constructor | Points |
|---|---|---|
| 1 | (Germany) BMW | 215 |
| 2 | (Italy) Alfa Romeo | 200 |
| 3 | (Spain) SEAT | 147 |
| 4 | (United States) Chevrolet | 54 |
| 5 | (United States) Ford | 8 |
