= M56 =

M56 or M-56 may refer to:

== Roads ==
- M56 motorway, north-west England
- M56 Lena highway (Russia), Russia
- M56 Kolyma Highway, Russia
- M56 (Cape Town), South Africa
- M56 (Johannesburg), South Africa
- M-56 (1919–1957 Michigan highway), a defunct American road around Monroe
- M-56 (1971–1987 Michigan highway), another defunct road around Flint

== Guns ==
- M56 Howitzer, a Yugoslav copy of the M101A1 howitzer
- M56 Scorpion, an unarmoured American self-propelled anti-tank gun
- M56 Smart Gun, a fictional weapon used in Aliens (film) and related media
- Zastava M56 submachine gun, a Yugoslavian submachine gun

== Other ==
- Messier 56, a globular cluster in the constellation Lyra
- M56 Coyote, Humvee smoke generator
- BMW M56, a straight-6 automobile engine
- The core of the ATI Radeon Mobility X1600 graphics processing unit
- M-56 steel helmet, designed in East Germany in 1956
- Infiniti M56, a Japanese luxury car
- A shortened designation for American M-1956 load-carrying equipment
