= BMW 3 Series (E46) =

Fourth generation of BMW 3 Series

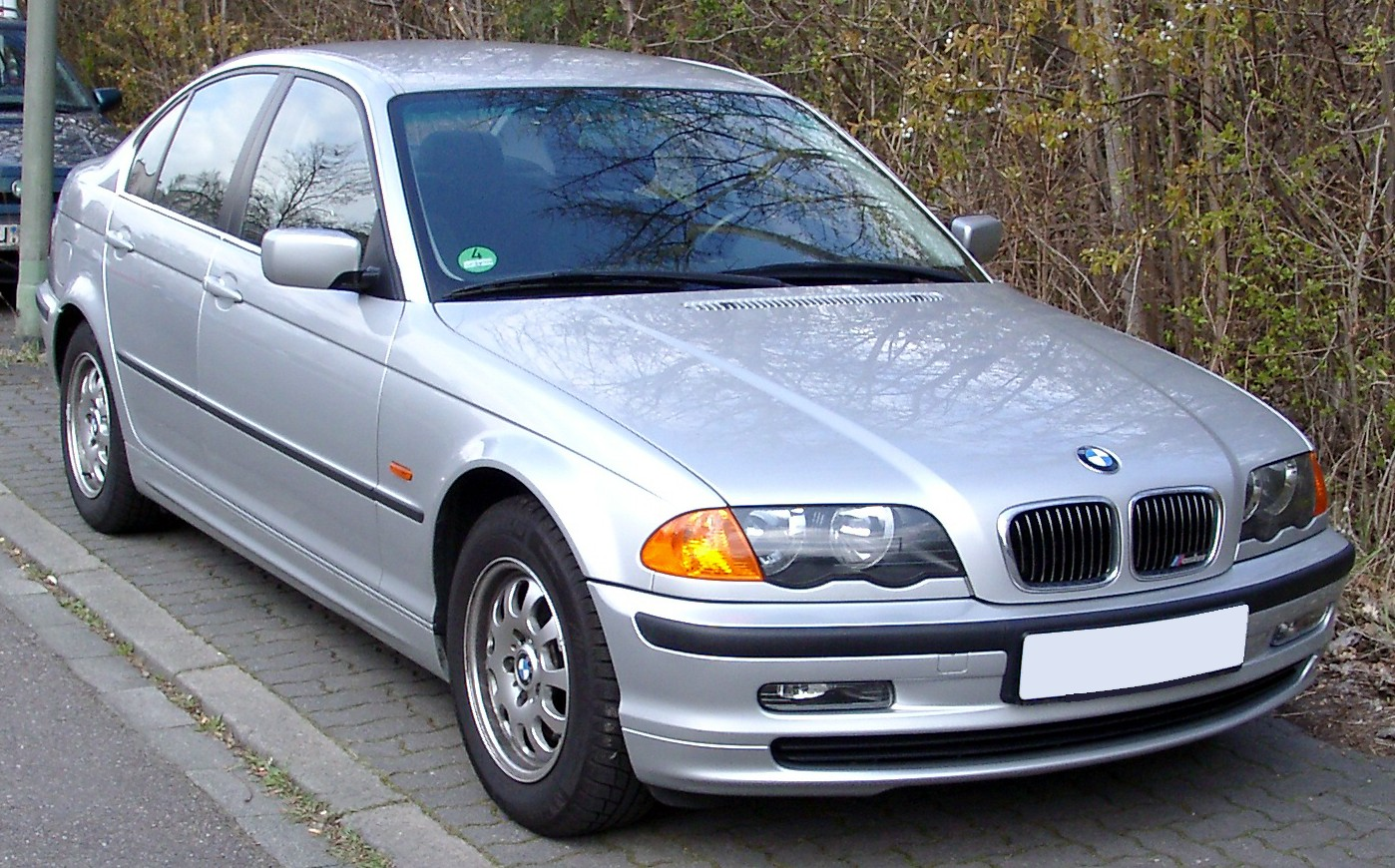

Overview
- Manufacturer: BMW
- Model code: E46
- Production: December 1997 – November 2006
- Model years: 1998–2006
- Assembly: Germany: Leipzig; Munich; Regensburg; South Africa: Rosslyn (BMW SA); China: Shenyang (BBA); Mexico: Toluca (BMW Mexico); Russia: Kaliningrad (Avtotor); Indonesia: Jakarta (Gaya Motor); Malaysia: Shah Alam (AMIM); Egypt: 6th of October City (BAG)
- Designer: Chris Bangle, Wolfgang Reitzle (sedan); Erik Goplen (coupe, convertible, station wagon)

Body and chassis
- Class: Compact executive car (D)
- Body style: 2-door coupé; 2-door convertible; 3-door hatchback; 4-door sedan; 5-door wagon
- Layout: Front-engine, rear-wheel-drive; Front-engine, all-wheel-drive ("xi/xd" sedan/wagon models only)
- Related: BMW M3 (E46); BMW 3 Series Compact (E46/5); BMW Z4 (E85); BMW X3 (E83); Alpina B3 E46

Powertrain
- Engine: Petrol: 1.6–2.0 L M43/N42/N46 I4; 2.0–3.2 L M52TÜ/M54/M56/S54 I6; Diesel: 2.0 L M47 I4; 2.9–3.0 L M57 I6
- Transmission: 5-speed manual; 6-speed manual; 4-speed automatic; 5-speed automatic; 6 speed SMG-II

Dimensions
- Wheelbase: 2,725 mm (107.3 in)
- Length: 4,470 mm (176.0 in) (sedan); 4,480 mm (176.4 in) (wagon); 4,490 mm (176.8 in) (coupe/convertible)
- Width: 1,740 mm (68.5 in) (sedan/wagon); 1,760–1,780 mm (69.3–70.1 in) (coupe/convertible)
- Height: 1,410–1,430 mm (55.5–56.3 in) (sedan/wagon); 1,360–1,370 mm (53.5–53.9 in) (coupe/convertible)
- Curb weight: 1,285–1,655 kg (2,833–3,649 lb) (sedan); 1,365–1,785 kg (3,009–3,935 lb) (wagon); 1,285–1,555 kg (2,833–3,428 lb) (coupe); 1,465–1,635 kg (3,230–3,605 lb) (convertible)

Chronology
- Predecessor: BMW 3 Series (E36)
- Successor: BMW 3 Series (E90)

The BMW 3 Series (E46) is the fourth generation of the BMW 3 Series range of compact executive cars manufactured by German automaker BMW. Produced from 1997 to 2006, it was the successor to the E36 3 Series, which ceased production in 2000. It was introduced in November 1997, and available in sedan, coupé, convertible, station wagon and hatchback body styles. The latter has been marketed as the 3 Series Compact.

The M3 performance model was introduced in June 2000 with a 2-door coupé body style, followed by the convertible counterpart in April 2001. The M3 is powered by the BMW S54 straight-six engine with either a 6-speed manual or a 6-speed SMG-II automated manual transmission.

The E46 line-up was phased out starting from late 2004, following the introduction of the E90 3 Series sedans. However, the E46 coupé and convertible body styles remained in production until August 2006.

== Overview ==
=== Development ===
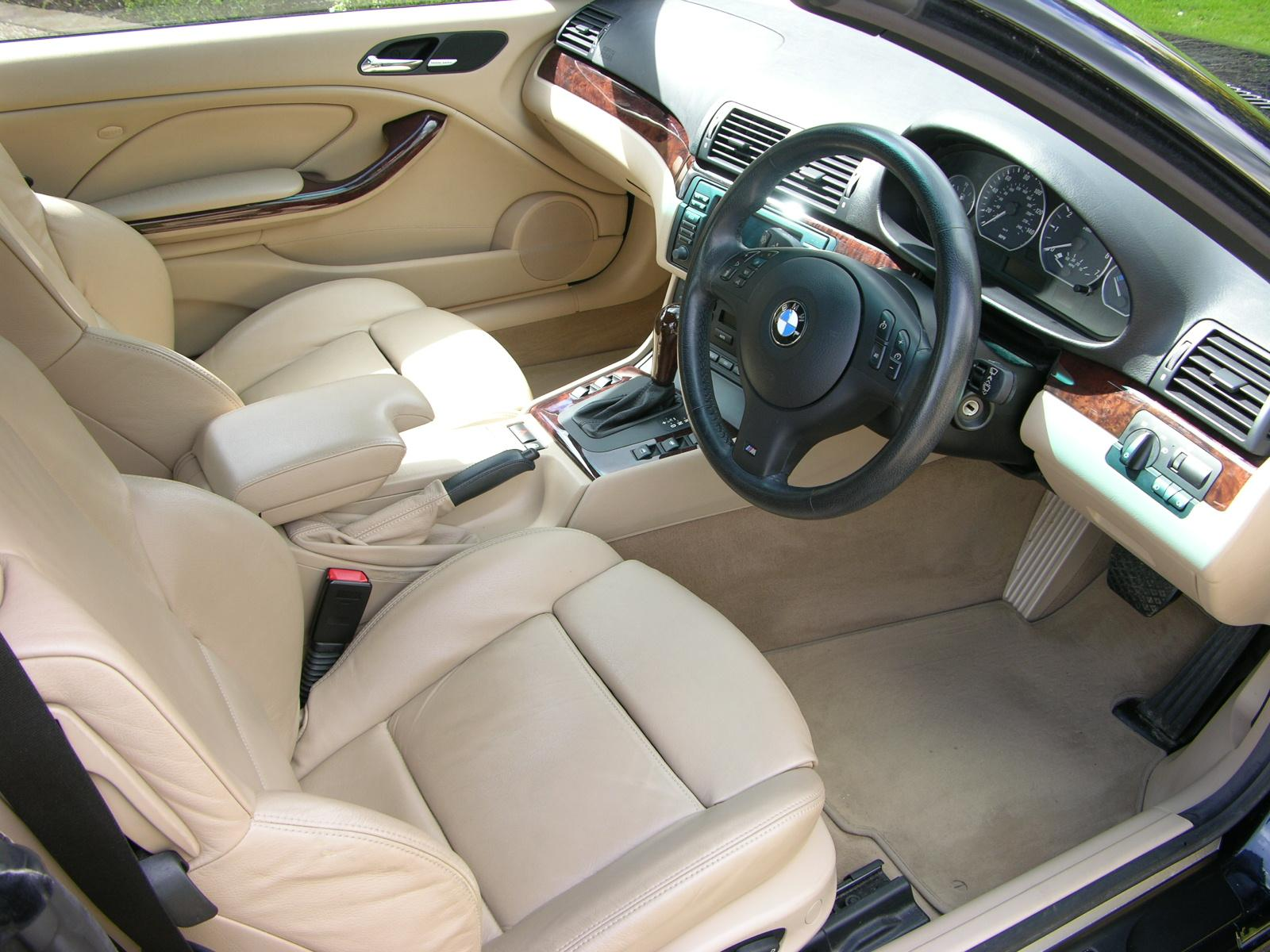
Interior

In 1993, the development programme for the E46 began under the lead of chief engineer Wolfgang Ziebart and head of R&D Wolfgang Reitzle. In late 1993, design work began under the lead of chief designer Chris Bangle and continued into 1995. In May 1995, the general exterior design of the E46 by Erik Goplen of DesignworksUSA was approved and as a result DesignworksUSA was contracted by BMW to work alongside BMW Group's in-house design team to create the exterior bodywork for the 3 Series range in February 1996. The design team put an emphasis on improving aerodynamics and increasing the car's aggressive stance. Design patents were filed in Germany on 16 July 1997 and in the US on 16 January 1998.

Chris Bangle and Wolfgang Reitzle were responsible through 1995 for the production sedan's exterior, as evident in the 1997 design patent. Production development of the sedan took 24 months following design freeze and was 31 months from executive board styling approval in 1995 to its start of series production in December 1997. Erik Goplen designed the production coupé, convertible and station wagon during between 1996 and 1997. The E46 sedan was unveiled via press release on 11 November 1997 and was launched on the market at the end of April 1998 with customer deliveries.

=== Chassis ===
The body shell of the E46 was claimed by BMW to be 70% more rigid than its E36 predecessor. Aluminium was used for an increased quantity of suspension components, in order to decrease unsprung mass. However, with a curb weight of 1,450 kg (3,197 lb), the E46 328ci is 55 kg (121 lb) heavier than the E36 equivalent.

In tune with BMW's core values regarding handling dynamics, the E46 was initially available with a rear-wheel drive layout and a 50/50 weight distribution. All-wheel drive, which was last available in the 3 Series in 1991, was reintroduced for the E46 on the 325xi, 330xi and 330xd models.

=== Electronics ===
The electronic components in the E46 are more integrated than previous generations of 3 Series, including the use of a CAN bus system. Drivetrain information (such as engine, transmission and stability control) is communicated using the CAN bus. Vehicle electronics (such as the radio, navigation, television and telecommunications) can communicate to each other via the K-bus.

The E46 was the first 3 Series to be available with an engine using Valvetronic (variable valve lift). Various electronic features were also introduced to the 3 Series in the E46 generation, including satellite navigation, electronic brake-force distribution, rain-sensing wipers and LED tail-lights.

=== Production and sales ===
The E46 was produced in Germany (Leipzig, Munich and Regensburg) and in South Africa (Rosslyn). Local assembly of complete knock-down (CKD) kits was used for cars sold in China, Egypt, Indonesia, Malaysia, Mexico, Thailand and Russia.

The highest-selling year for the E46 chassis was 2002, when 561,249 vehicles were sold worldwide.

== Body styles ==
=== Sedan ===
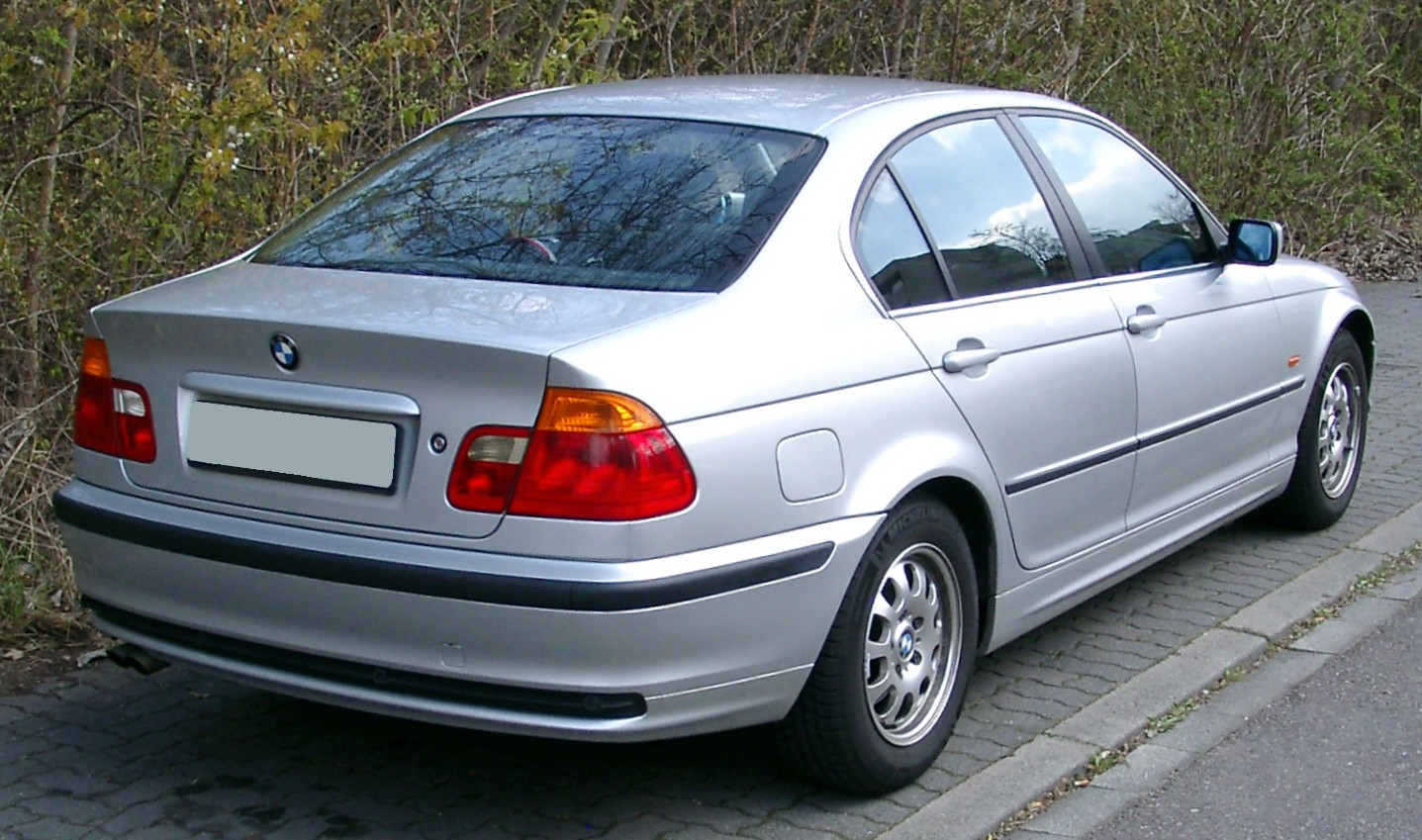
Sedan

4-door sedan/saloon (E46 Sedan), produced from December 1997 to May 2005 (CKD production continued until December 2005). 1,918,984 examples built (includes 54,528 CKD).

Production years: 1997–2005

Facelift: September 2001 (2002 model year)

Variants: 316i, 318d, 318i, 320d, 320i, 323i, 325i, 325xi, 328i, 330d, 330i and 330xi

=== Touring ===
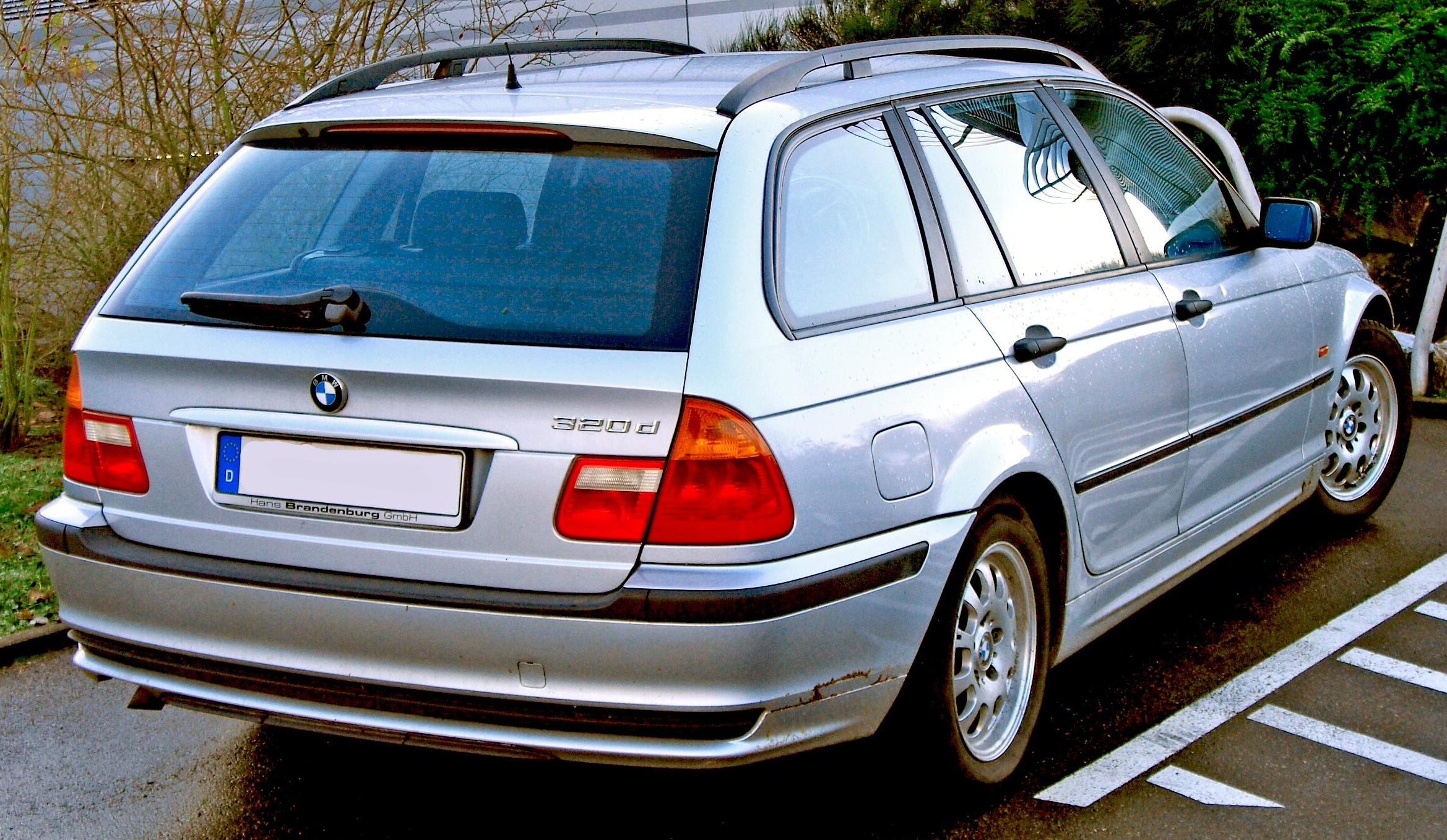
Wagon/Estate

Touring – 5-door wagon/estate (E46 Touring), produced from January 1999 to May 2005. 428,061 examples built.

Production Years: 1999–2005

Facelift: September 2001 (2002 model year)

Variants: 316i, 318d, 318i, 320d, 320i, 323i, 325i, 325xi, 328i, 330d, 330i, 330xd and 330xi

=== Coupé ===
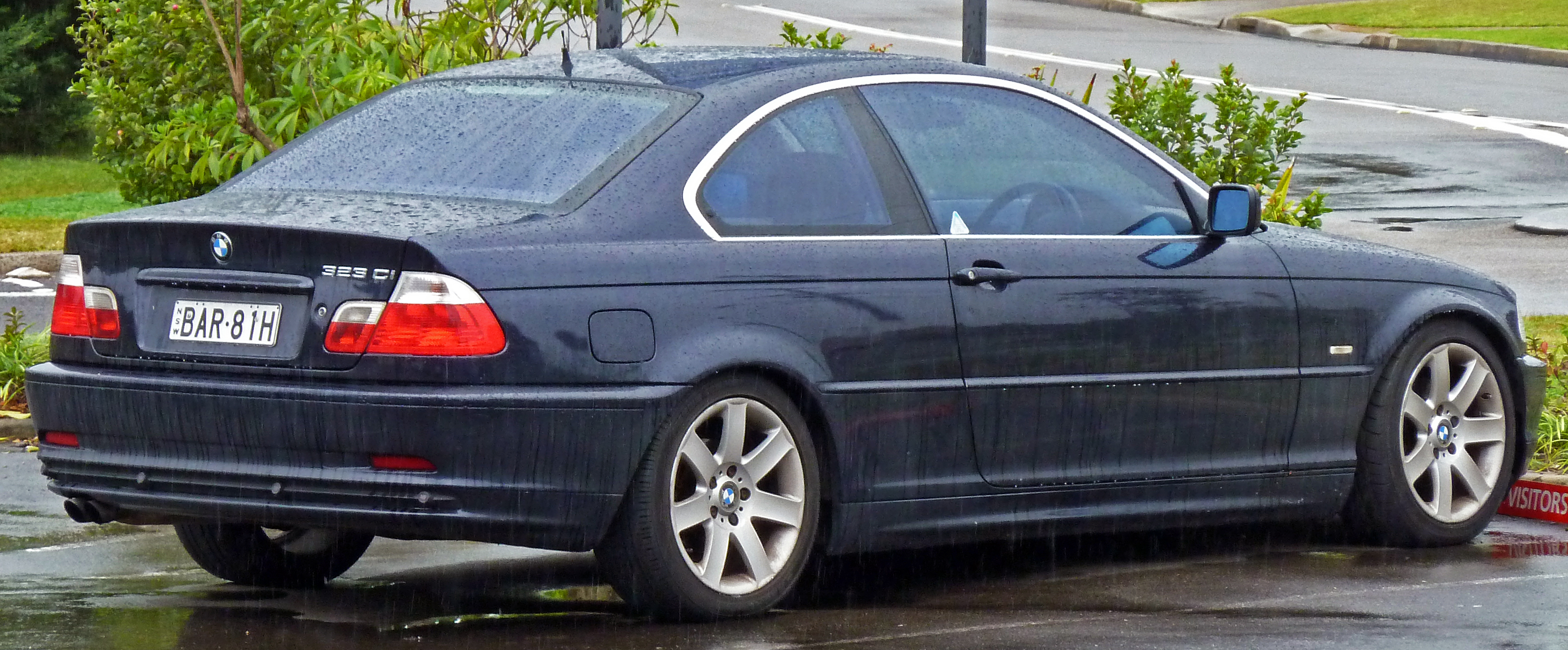
Coupé

2-door coupé (E46 Coupé), produced from December 1998 to May 2006. 443,264 examples built.

Production years: 1998–2006

Facelift: March 2003 (2004 model year)

Variants: 316Ci, 318Ci, 320Cd, 320Ci, 323Ci, 325Ci, 328Ci, 330Cd, 330Ci, M3 and M3 CSL

=== Convertible ===
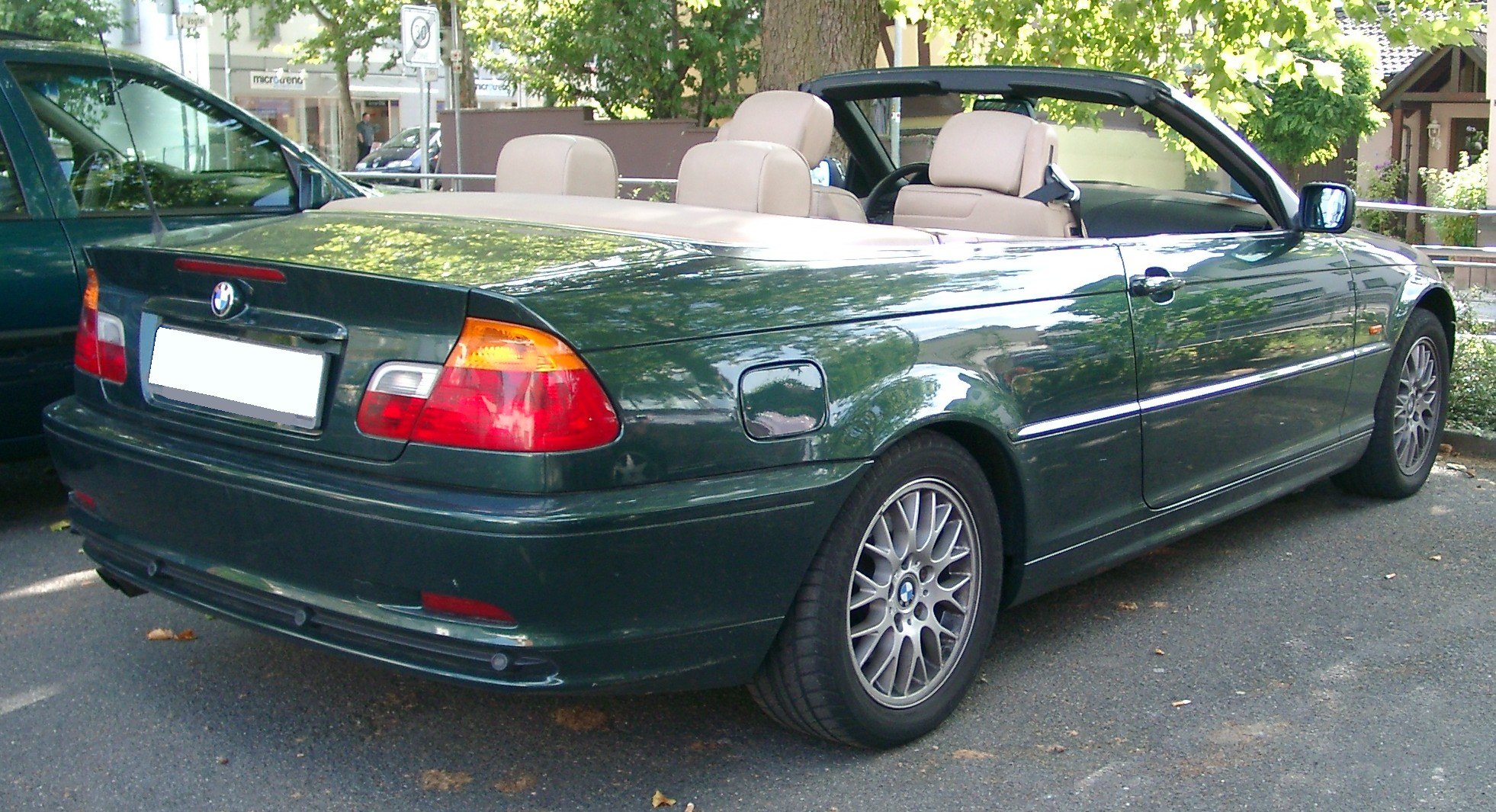
Convertible

Cabriolet – 2-door convertible (E46 Convertible), produced from December 1999 to November 2006. BMW made 277,146 total.

Production years: 1999–2006

Facelift: March 2003 (2004 model year)

Variants: 318Ci, 320Cd, 320Ci, 323Ci, 325Ci, 330Cd, 330Ci and M3

=== Compact ===
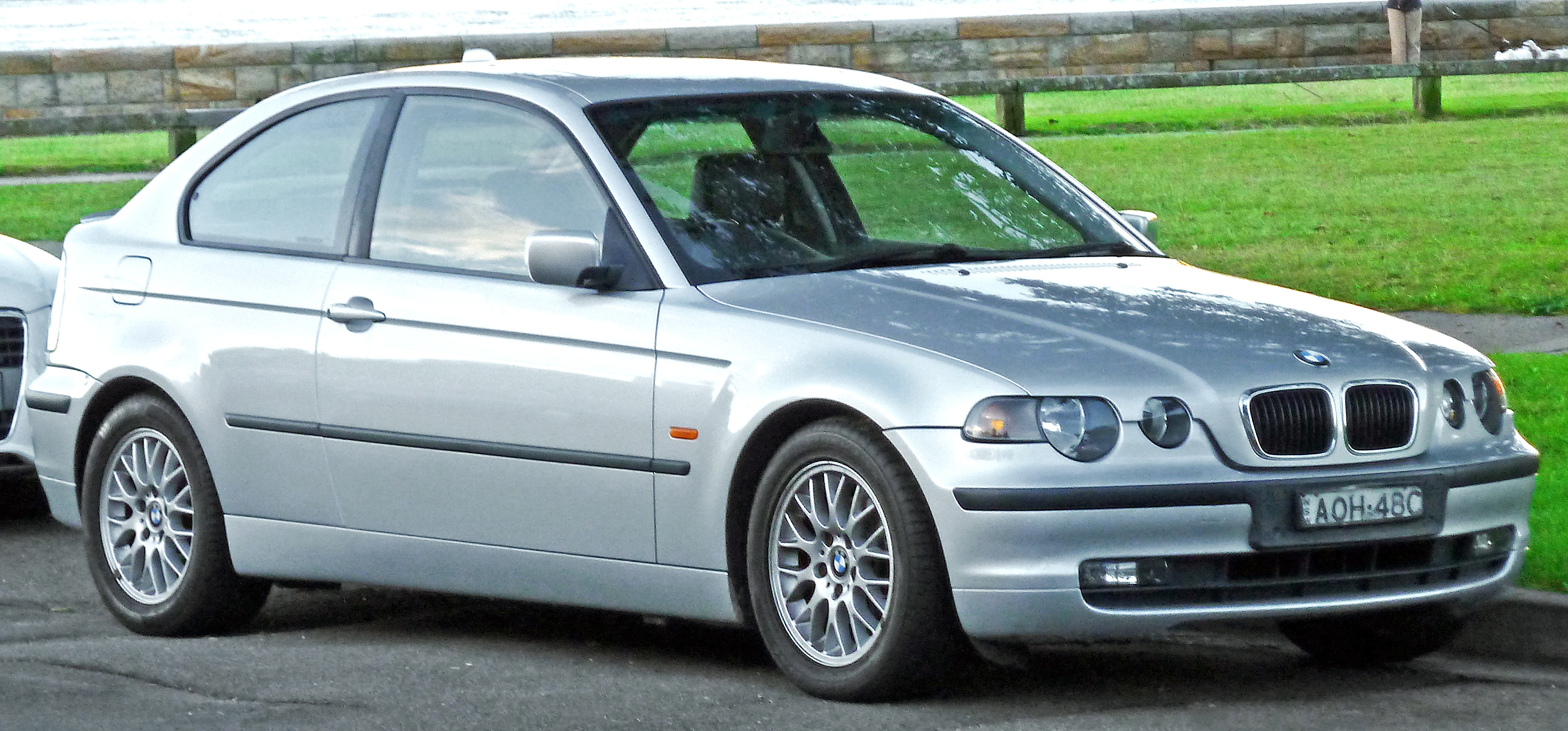
3 Series Compact (E46/5)

Compact – 3-door hatchback (E46 Compact), produced from April 2000 to December 2004. 199,430 examples built.

The shorter three-door hatchback version of the E46 was marketed as the BMW 3 Series Compact. The exterior styling has several differences to the rest of the E46 3 Series range, notably the distinctive headlights and tail-lights. Mechanically, the Compact shares many elements with the rest of the E46 range, however the steering rack has a faster ratio.

Production years: 2000–2004

Facelift: September 2001 (2002 model year)

Variants: 316ti, 318td, 318ti, 320td and 325ti

== Engines ==
Factory specifications are listed below. Coupé and convertible models were badged as "Ci (petrol) or Cd (diesel)", and all-wheel drive models were badged as "Xi (petrol) or Xd (diesel)".

=== Petrol ===
| Model | Years | Engine | Power | Torque |
|---|---|---|---|---|
| 316i | 1999–2001 | 1.9 L M43B19 inline-4 | 77 kW (105 PS; 103 hp) | 165 N⋅m (122 lb⋅ft) |
| 316i | 2001–2004 | 1.6 L N40B16 inline-4 | 85 kW (116 PS; 114 hp) | 150 N⋅m (111 lb⋅ft) |
| 316i | 2001–2004 | 1.8 L N42B18 inline-4 | 85 kW (116 PS; 114 hp) | 175 N⋅m (129 lb⋅ft) |
| 316i | 2004–2005 | 1.8 L N46B18 inline-4 | 85 kW (116 PS; 114 hp) | 175 N⋅m (129 lb⋅ft) |
| 318i | 1998–2001 | 1.9 L M43B19 inline-4 | 87 kW (118 PS; 117 hp) | 180 N⋅m (133 lb⋅ft) |
| 318i | 2001–2005 | 2.0 L N42B20 inline-4 | 105 kW (143 PS; 141 hp) | 200 N⋅m (148 lb⋅ft) |
| 318i | 2003–2007 | 2.0 L N46B20A inline-4 | 105 kW (143 PS; 141 hp) | 200 N⋅m (148 lb⋅ft) |
| 318Ci | 2005–2007 | 2.0 L N46B20A inline-4 | 110 kW (150 PS; 148 hp) | 200 N⋅m (148 lb⋅ft) |
| 320i | 1998–2000 | 2.0 L M52TÜB20 inline-6 | 110 kW (150 PS; 148 hp) | 190 N⋅m (140 lb⋅ft) |
| 320i | 2000–2006 | 2.2 L M54B22 inline-6 | 125 kW (170 PS; 168 hp) | 210 N⋅m (155 lb⋅ft) |
| 323i | 1998–2000 | 2.5 L M52TÜB25 inline-6 | 125 kW (170 PS; 168 hp) | 245 N⋅m (181 lb⋅ft) |
| 325i (EU) | 2001–2006 | 2.5 L M54B25 inline-6 | 141 kW (192 PS; 189 hp) | 245 N⋅m (181 lb⋅ft) |
| 325i (US) | 2001–2006 | 2.5 L M54B25 inline-6 | 137 kW (186 PS; 184 hp) | 237 N⋅m (175 lb⋅ft) |
| 325i SULEV | 2003-2006 | 2.5 L M56B25 Inline-6 | 135 kW (184 PS; 181 hp) | 234 N⋅m (173 lb⋅ft) |
| 328i | 1998–2000 | 2.8 L M52TÜB28 inline-6 | 142 kW (193 PS; 190 hp) | 280 N⋅m (207 lb⋅ft) |
| 330i (EU) | 2000–2006 | 3.0 L M54B30 inline-6 | 170 kW (231 PS; 228 hp) | 300 N⋅m (221 lb⋅ft) |
| 330i (US) | 2000–2006 | 3.0 L M54B30 inline-6 | 168 kW (228 PS; 225 hp) | 290 N⋅m (214 lb⋅ft) |
| 330i ZHP | 2003–2006 | 3.0 L M54B30 inline-6 | 175 kW (238 PS; 235 hp) | 301 N⋅m (222 lb⋅ft) |
| M3 (EU) | 2000–2006 | 3.2 L S54B32 inline-6 | 252 kW (343 PS; 338 hp) | 365 N⋅m (269 lb⋅ft) |
| M3 (US) | 2000–2006 | 3.2 L S54B32 inline-6 | 248 kW (337 PS; 333 hp) | 355 N⋅m (262 lb⋅ft) |
| M3 CSL | 2003–2004 | 3.2 L S54B32HP inline-6 | 265 kW (360 PS; 355 hp) | 370 N⋅m (273 lb⋅ft) |

=== Diesel ===
| Model | Years | Engine | Power | Torque |
|---|---|---|---|---|
| 318d | 2001–2003 | 2.0 L M47D20 inline-4 | 85 kW (116 PS; 114 hp) | 265 N⋅m (195 lb⋅ft) |
| 318d | 2003–2005 | 2.0 L M47TÜD20 inline-4 | 85 kW (116 PS; 114 hp) | 280 N⋅m (207 lb⋅ft) |
| 320d | 1998–2001 | 2.0 L M47D20 inline-4 | 100 kW (136 PS; 134 hp) | 280 N⋅m (207 lb⋅ft) |
| 320d | 2001–2006 | 2.0 L M47TÜD20 inline-4 | 110 kW (150 PS; 148 hp) | 330 N⋅m (243 lb⋅ft) |
| 330d | 1999–2003 | 3.0 L M57D30 inline-6 | 135 kW (184 PS; 181 hp) | 390 N⋅m (288 lb⋅ft) |
| 330d | 2003–2005 | 3.0 L M57TÜD30 inline-6 | 150 kW (204 PS; 201 hp) | 410 N⋅m (302 lb⋅ft) |

== Drivetrain ==
=== Manual transmissions ===
- 5-speed ZF S5-39 (325xi, 330xi)
- 5-speed Getrag 250G (316i, 318i, 320i, 323i, 325i)
- 5 speed ZF S5-31 (320d, 328Ci, 330i, 330Ci, 325xi)
- 6-speed ZF S6-37 (325ti, 330i, 330Ci, 330xi, 320d, 320Cd)
- 6-speed ZF S6-53 (330d, 330xd, 330 Cd)
- 6-speed Getrag 420G (M3)

=== Automatic transmissions ===
- 4-speed GM 4L30-E (A4S270R)
- 5-speed GM 5L40-E (A5S360R)
- 5-speed GM 5L40-E (A5S390R)
- 5-speed ZF 5HP19 (A5S325Z) (330i has a more reinforced 5HP19 compared to 320/325i)
- 5-speed GM 5L50-E (A5S390R)
- 6-speed SMG-II
- 6-speed Non-M SMG-I

== M3 ==
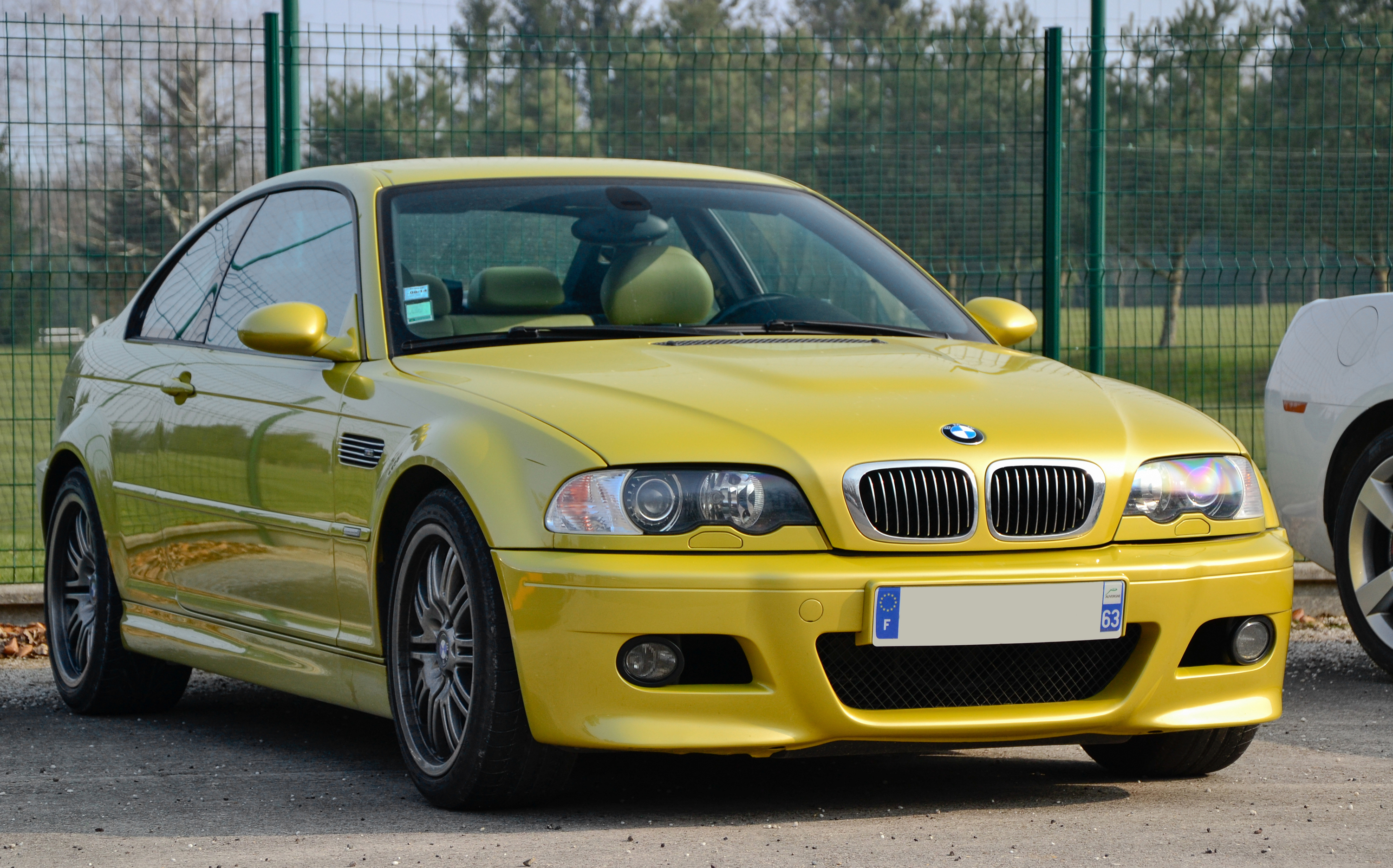
E46 M3

The E46 M3 was introduced in October 2000, available with the 3.2-litre S54 M-tuned engine. It was offered in coupé and convertible body styles.

The M3's S54 engine has a redline of 8,000 rpm. As with most M engines, the S54 has 6 individual throttle bodies, in this case electronically operated (drive-by-wire throttle). The transmission options for the M3 were a 6-speed manual or the 6-speed "SMG-II" automated manual transmission.

There was also a lighter and faster M3 CSL model; CSL stands for Coupé Sport Leichtbau ("Coupé Sport Lightweight). Weight was reduced by removing equipment and replacing the roof, door panel, and centre console with carbon fibre pieces.

=== M3 GTR road car ===
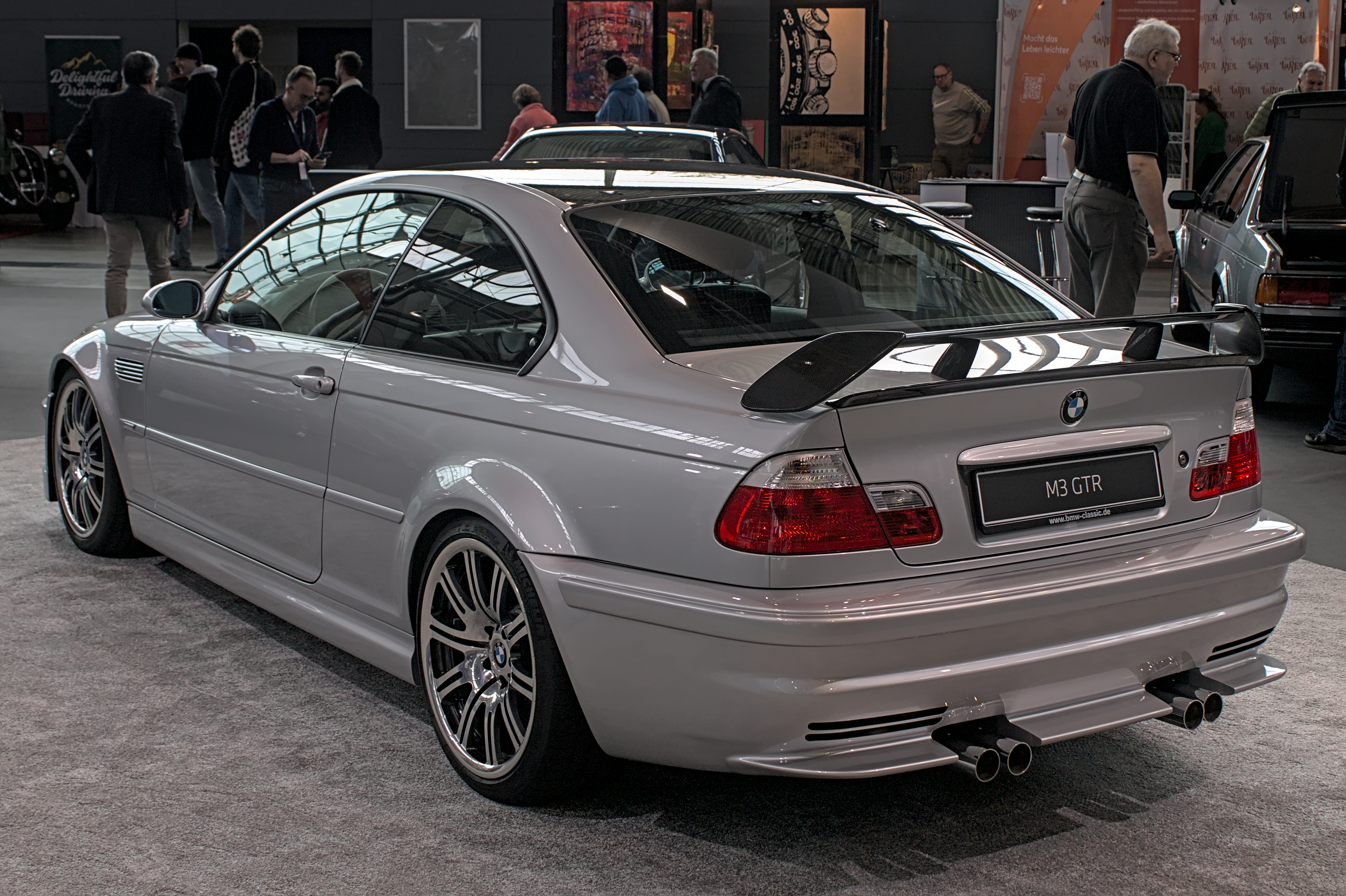
E46 M3 GTR Straßen Version

In order for the M3 GTR race car to compete in the American Le Mans Series, BMW produced 10 examples of the "M3 GTR Straßen Version" (street version) in 2001. As per the race M3 GTR, the roadgoing Version was powered by the BMW P60B40 4.0 L V8 engine which was slightly detuned and generated a maximum power output of 283 kW (380 hp) at 7,000 rpm. Power was delivered to the rear wheels via a race type 6-speed dual clutch sequential transmission with M locking differential. The engine featured dry sump lubrication as its racing counterpart and bigger radiators.

The stiffer chassis and suspension system were a carryover from the race version. The car was lowered further than a standard M3 and featured additional strut braces between the firewall and strut towers as well as between the right shock towers. The redesigned front and rear fascias and the rear wing optimised aerodynamics.

The roof, the hood, the rear wing and front and rear fascias were made from carbon-fibre in order to reduce weight. Notable changes made to the interior included leather Recaro bucket seats, removal of rear seats and special M3 GTR sill plates.

== Alpina models ==
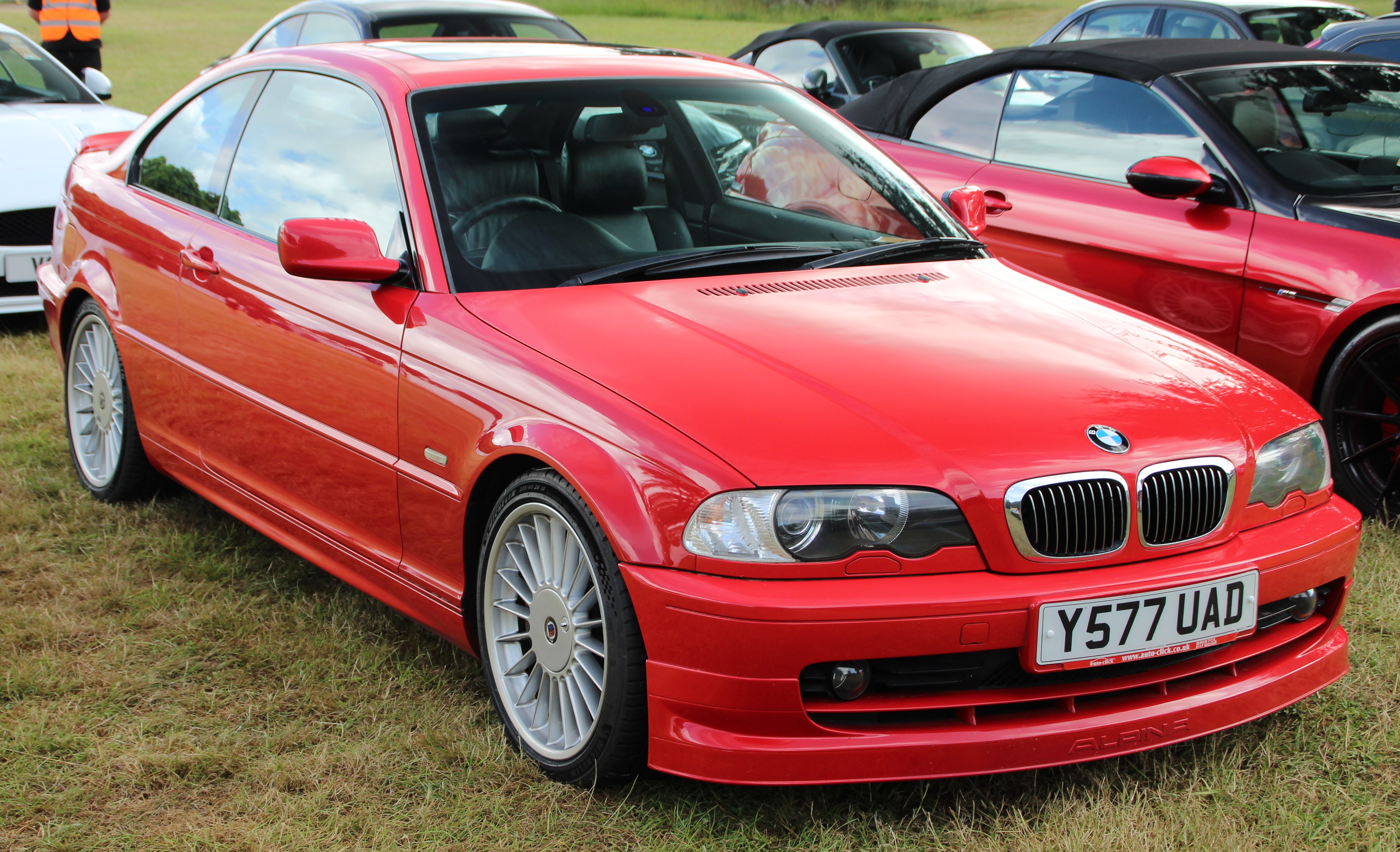
Alpina B3

The Alpina "B3 3.3" and "B3 S" were based on the E46 and were powered by inline-six petrol engines.

== Special models ==
=== Performance package (ZHP) ===
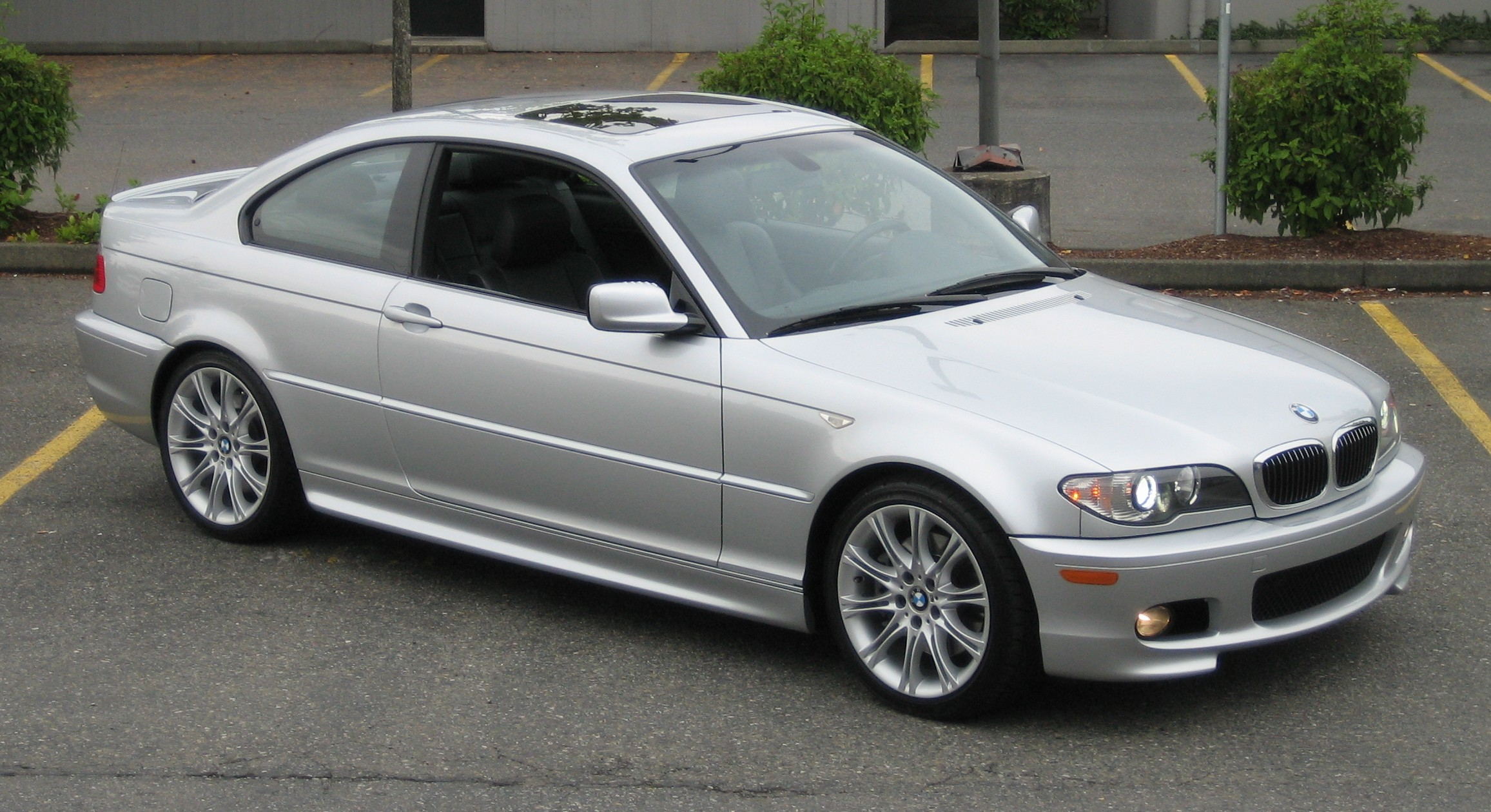
330ci ZHP

The Performance Package was an option sold in North America, which is commonly referred to by its order code in the United States, ZHP (the order code in Canada was ZAM). It was available for 330i sedans from model years 2003 to 2005, and available for 330ci coupés and convertibles from 2004 to 2006. It included various aesthetic changes over the regular 3 series, as well as functional and mechanical enhancements.

The ZHP was equipped with sportier camshafts and revised engine tuning to increase power output from 225 to 235 hp (168 to 175 kW) as well as a shorter final drive gear ratio, and a corresponding increase in redline from 6,500 rpm to 6,800 rpm. Suspension was modified over the standard suspension with firmer springs and dampers, larger anti-roll bars, stronger front control arm ball joints, a lower ride height, heavy duty steering rack, and slightly more negative camber. Car and Driver magazine track-tested the car, which recorded a 0–60 mph (97 km/h) acceleration time of 5.6 seconds and a 1/4 mile time of 14.3 seconds.

=== 325i SULEV ===
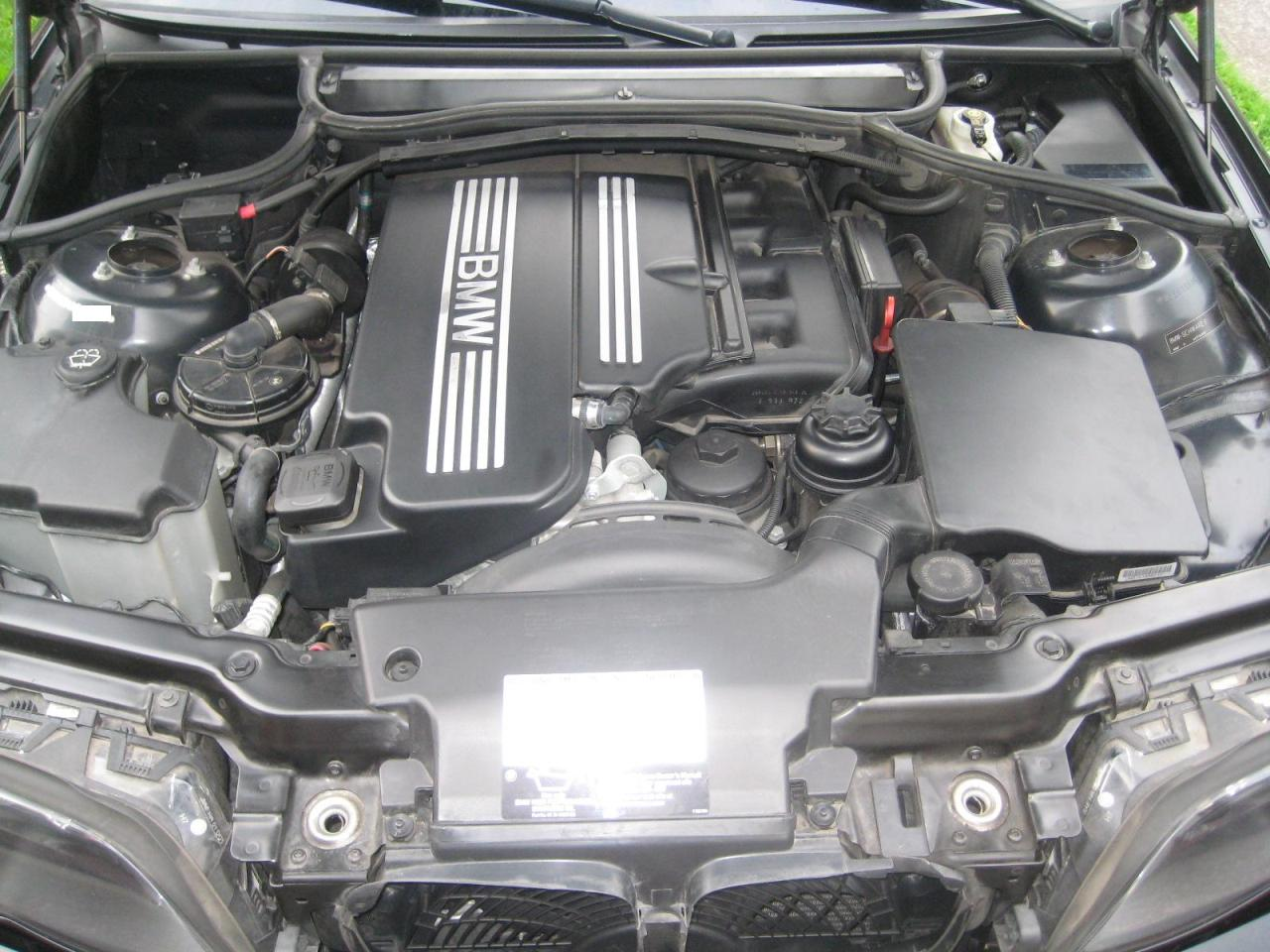
BMW M56 SULEV inline-six engine

In some parts of the United States, BMW sold a version of the 325i which met the super ultra low emission vehicle (SULEV) emissions standards. California, New York, and Massachusetts received the SULEV E46's in 2003, and Vermont in 2004. They utilised a variant of the M54 engine named the BMW M56. The M56 meets SULEV standards, as well as partial zero emission vehicle (PZEV) and zero evaporative emissions requirements. The M56 is claimed to have identical power output as its M54 counterpart.

=== 320Ci/325Ci/330Ci Clubsport ===
330Ci Clubsport

The Clubsport package was available only for the 320Ci/325Ci/330Ci M-Sport models in 2002 and came in these colours: Estoril Blue, Velvet Blue, Titanium Silver and Carbon Black. The package removed 20 kg insulation materials, added an optional rear M spoiler and two spoiler lips on the front bumper, and chromed exhaust tailpipes. Style 71 M-Double Spoke Split rim wheels were standard (BMW's photos show Style 72 wheels). Interior equipment included M short gear shift, aluminum or black "Alu-Tech" trims, silver rings on cluster, door sills with "M Clubsport" letters, and an interior finished in half-leather and half-fabric "M Texture" cloth. The Clubsport was offered with the 5/6-Speed manual, 6-Speed SMG, or 5-Speed Steptronic transmissions.

== Model year changes ==
=== 2000 ===
- Electronic Stability Control ("Dynamic Stability Control") introduced, replacing the previous ASC+T traction control system.
- Manual shift mode ("Steptronic") added to automatic transmissions.

=== 2001 facelift ===
In September 2001, the facelift versions of the sedan and Touring were released for the 2002 model year.

- 320i switched to M54 engine (from M52TÜ engine).
- 325i (M54 engine) replaced 323i (M52TÜ engine).
- 330i (M54 engine) replaced 328i (M52TÜ engine).
- 320d switched to M47TÜ engine (from M47 engine).
- Display for navigation system upgraded to widescreen.
- Sedan and Touring received revised headlights, tail-lights (sedan only), grille, hood, front fenders and front bumpers.
- Single Xenon headlights for 2001 and in 2002 Xenon were installed for high-beam lamps; Bi-Xenon headlights for 2002.
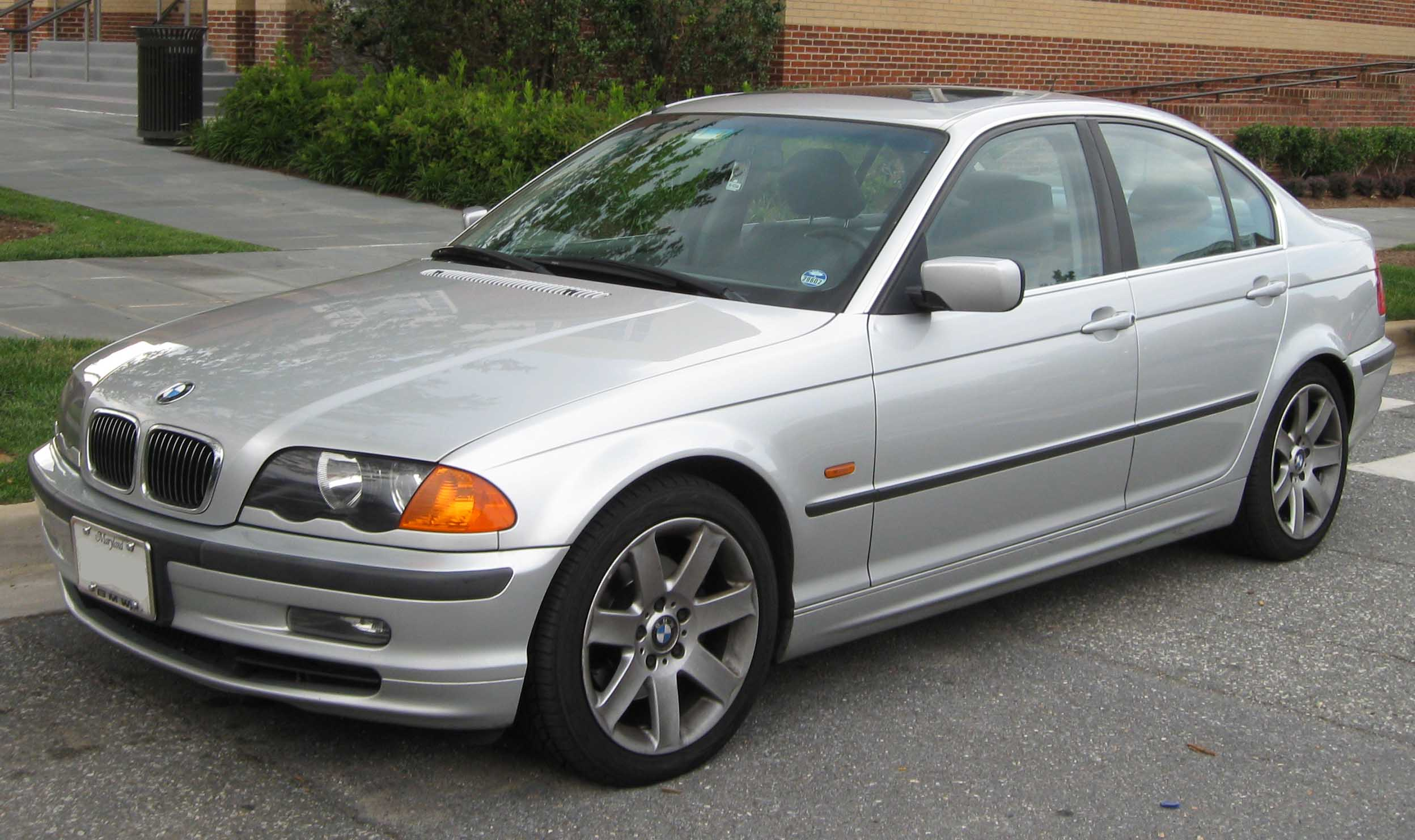
pre-facelift sedan

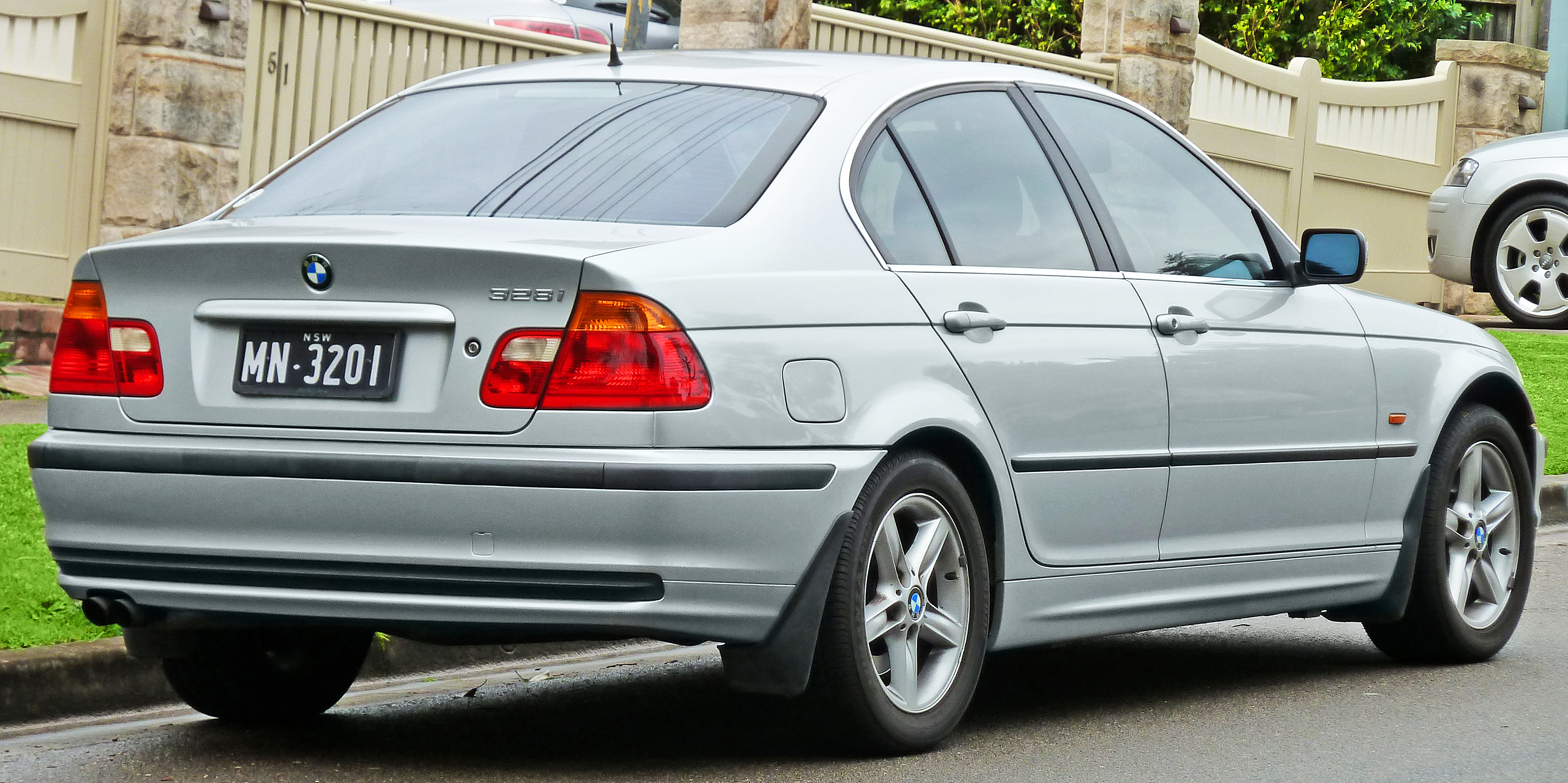
pre-facelift sedan

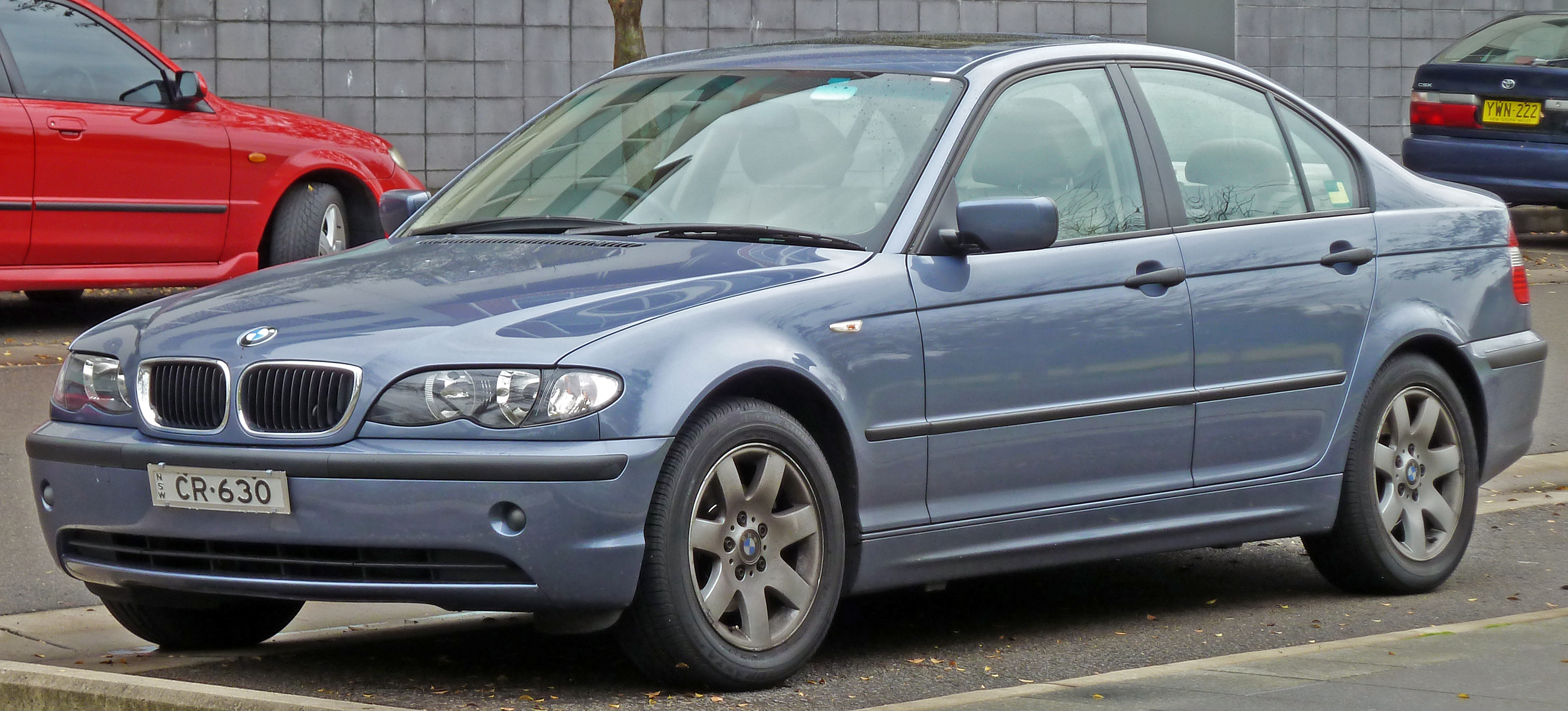
facelift sedan

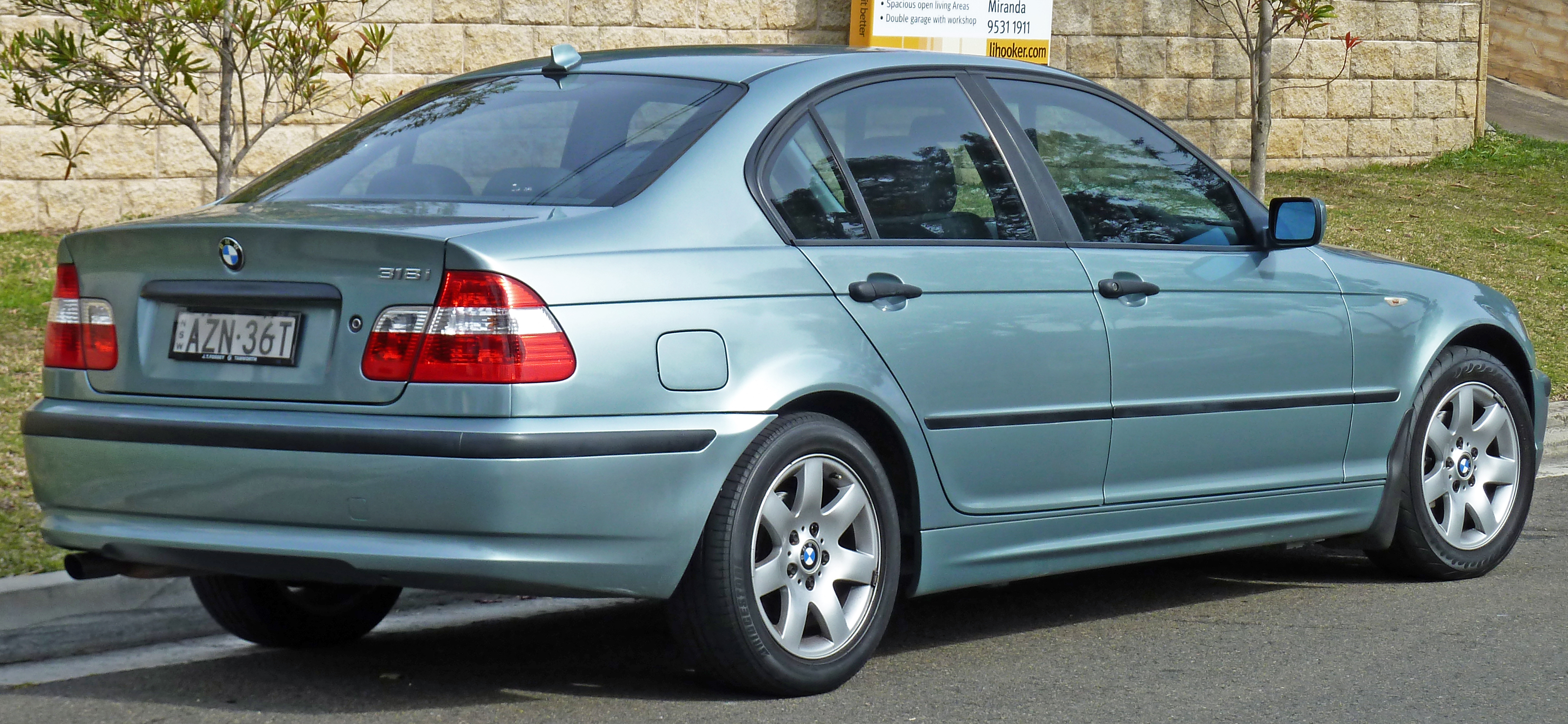
facelift sedan

=== 2003 ===
In March 2003, the facelift versions of the coupe and convertible models (except M3) were released for the 2004 model year.

- 330d switched to M57TÜ engine (from M57 engine).
- Navigation system upgraded to Mark IV version, which is DVD-based.
- Auxiliary input for sound system became available.
- SULEV engine option (M56) became available for 325i models with automatic transmission (only in select parts of the United States).
- Manual transmission for 330 models upgraded from 5-speed to 6-speed.
- Coupes and convertibles received revised headlights, tail-lights (LED), grille, hood and front bumper.
- Adaptive headlights available for coupé and convertible models
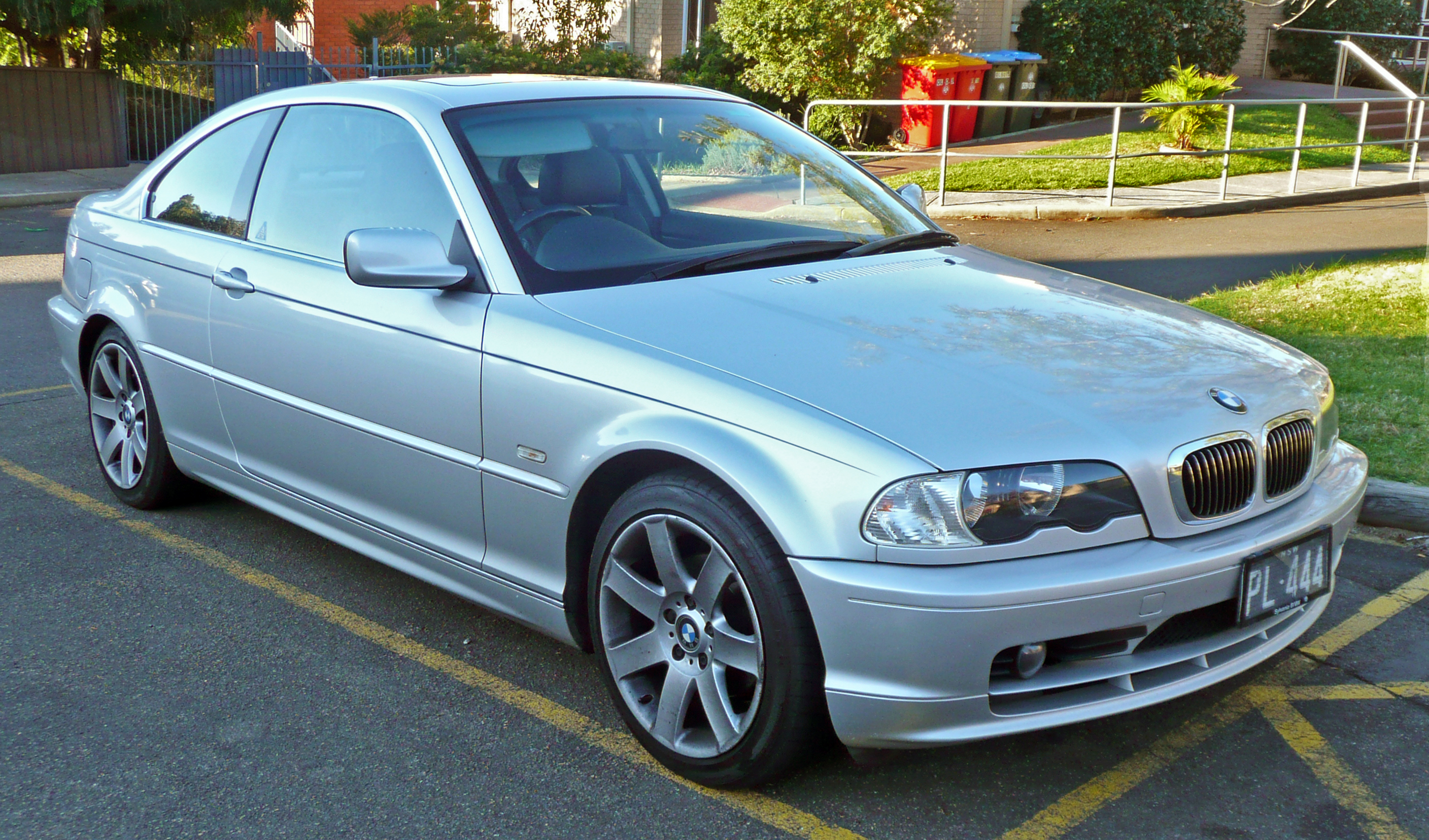
pre-facelift coupé (front)

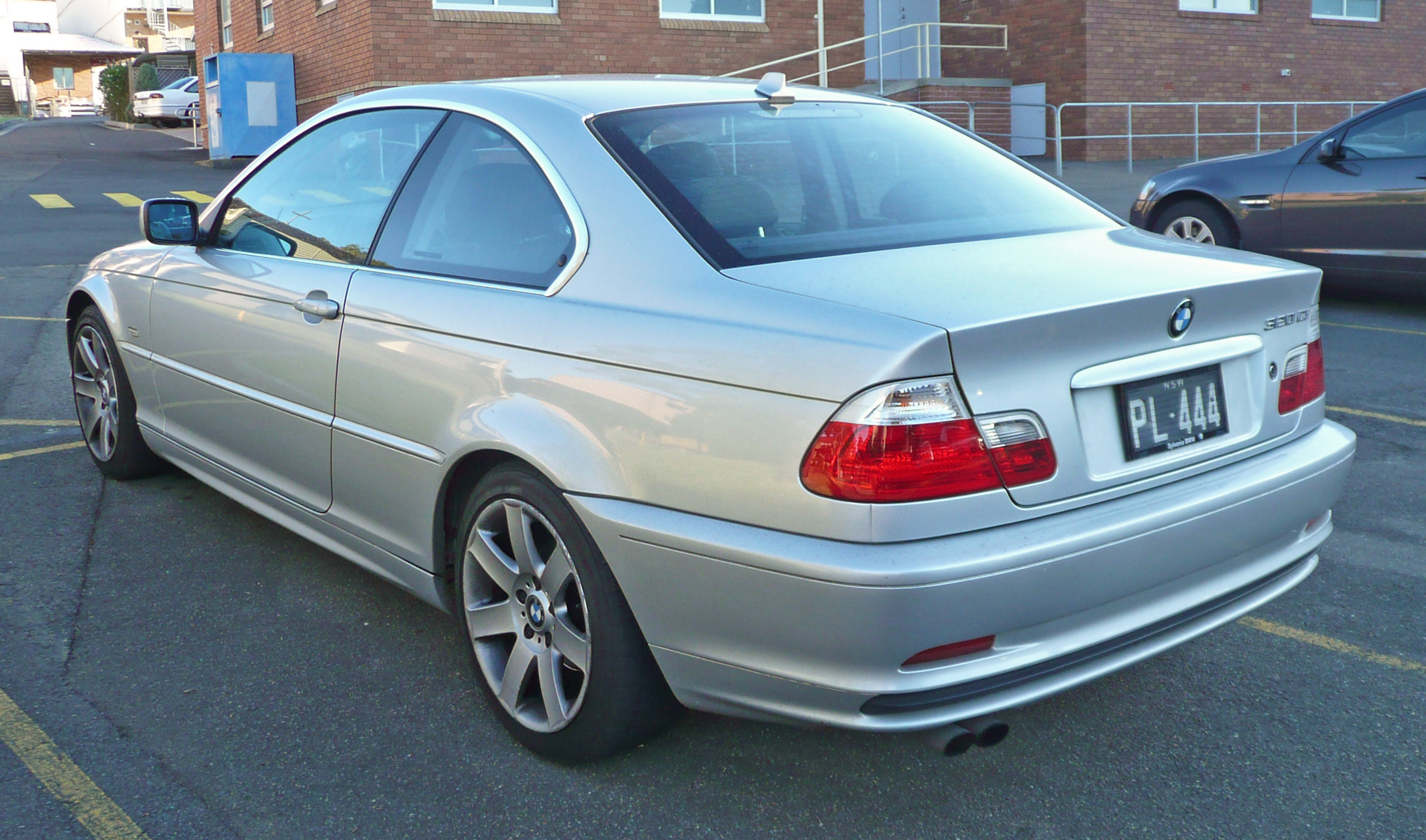
pre-facelift coupé (rear)

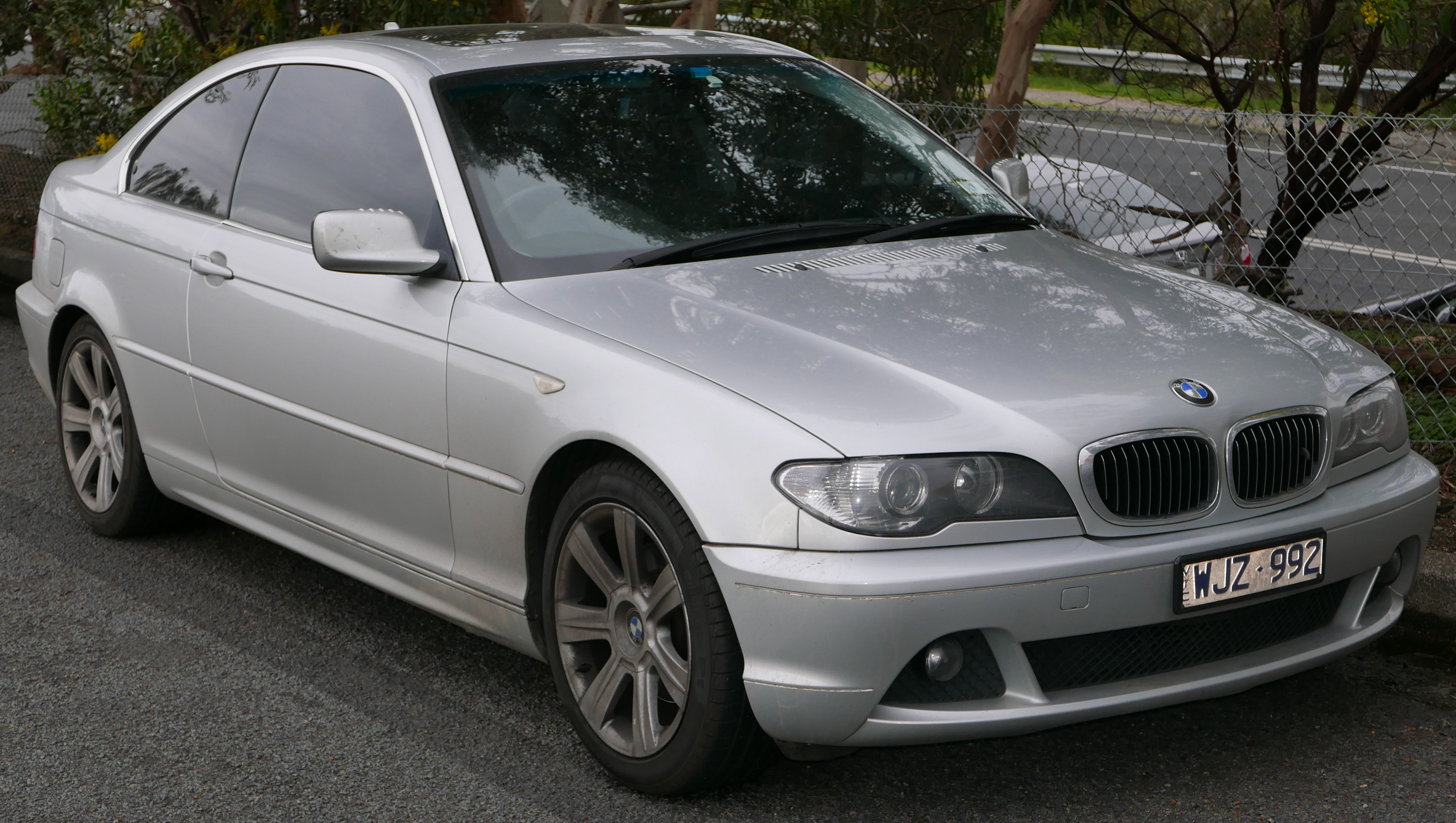
facelift coupé (front)

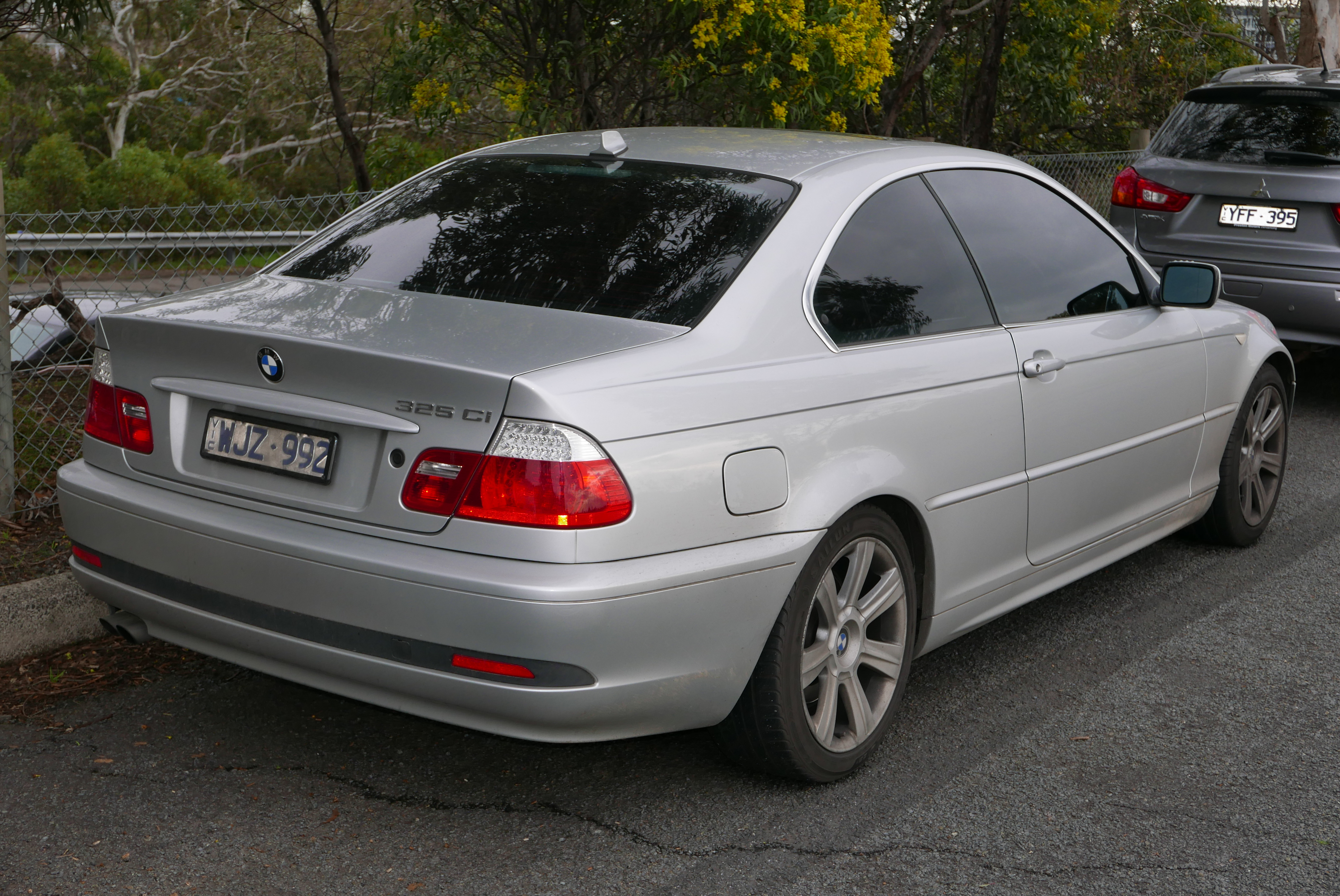
facelift coupé (rear)

== Motorsport ==
Andy Priaulx won the 2004 European Touring Car Championship season and 2005 World Touring Car Championship season championships driving a 320i. Franz Engstler won the 2006 Asian Touring Car Championship season in a 320i.

The E46 has also competed in the British, European and Russian touring car championships.

| Year | Championship | Result |
|---|---|---|
| 2003 | European Touring Car Championship | 3 |
| 2004 | Danish Touringcar Championship | 1 |
| 2004 | European Touring Car Championship | 1 |
| 2005 | Danish Touringcar Championship | 1 |
| 2005 | Italian Superturismo Championship | 1 |
| 2005 | World Touring Car Championship | 1 |
| 2006 | Asian Touring Car Championship | 1 |
| 2006 | British Touring Car Championship | 11 |
| 2008 | European Touring Car Cup | 1 |

In the United States, the National Auto Sport Association and BMW Car Club of America (BMW CCA) organized a "Spec E46" amateur racing series. The Spec E46 cars were built to a standard with limited modifications, to create a level playing field and increased competition between drivers. By mid-2020, Spec E46 had become one of BMW CCA's three largest racing classes.
