= 2006 Asian Touring Car Championship =

Second season of ATCC under Super 2000/BTC rules

The 2006 Asian Touring Car Championship season was the second season of the ATCC under Super 2000/BTC rules. It consisted of twelve rounds run over five weekends (the first three weekends having two rounds and the last two having three) in four countries in southeast Asia.

== Teams and drivers ==
Division 1 (S2000/BTC)
| Team | Car | No. | Driver | Notes |
|---|---|---|---|---|
| (Germany) Engstler Motorsport | BMW 320i | 1 | (Germany) Franz Engstler | |
| (Germany) Engstler Motorsport | BMW 320i | 23 | (Macau) Ao Chi Hong | Rounds 5-12 |
| (Malaysia) Team Petronas | Proton Impian | 10 | (South Africa) Michael Briggs | |
| (Malaysia) Team Petronas | Proton Impian | 15 | (Malaysia) Fariqe Hairuman | |
| (Malaysia) Team Petronas | Proton Impian | 20 | (Malaysia) Mashlino Buang | |
| (Taiwan) CPC AAI | Honda Integra DC5 | 91 | (Taiwan) Chen Jun San | Rounds 10-12 |
Division 2 (Super Production)
| (Hong Kong) DTM Bel’Air Racing | Honda Integra DC5 | 8 | (Hong Kong) Cheung Chi Sing | |
| (Hong Kong) DTM Bel’Air Racing | Honda Integra DC5 | 9 | (Hong Kong) Danny Stacy Chau | |
| (Hong Kong) DTM Bel’Air Racing | Honda Integra DC5 | 28 | (Hong Kong) Man Ting Yu | |
| (Hong Kong) DTM Bel’Air Racing | Honda Integra DC5 | 33 | (Singapore) George Ong | |
| (Germany) Engstler Motorsport | BMW 320i | 21 | (Germany) Andreas Klinge | Rounds 1-4, 7-12 |
| (Germany) Engstler Motorsport | BMW 320i | 21 | (Germany) Markus Lungstrass | Rounds 5-6 |
| (Taiwan) CPC AAI | Toyota Altezza | 91 | (Taiwan) Chen Jun San | Rounds 6-9 |
| (Macau) Privateer | Honda Integra DC5 | 3 | (Macau) Liu Lic Ka | Rounds 7-12 |
| (Macau) Privateer | Honda Integra DC5 | 12 | (Macau) Henry Ho | Rounds 1-6, 10-12 |
| (Macau) Privateer | Honda Integra DC5 | 37 | (Macau) Sun Tit Fan | Rounds 10-12 |
| (Hong Kong) Privateer | Honda Integra DC5 | 38 | (Hong Kong) Siu Yuk Lung | Rounds 10-12 |
| (Macau) Privateer | Honda Integra DC5 | 99 | (Macau) Ng Kin Veng | Rounds 10-12 |
| (Malaysia) Privateer | Honda Civic | 19 | (Malaysia) Eric Yeo | Rounds 1-2 |
| (Macau) Privateer | Honda Civic | 11 | (Macau) Belmiro Jesus Aguiar | Rounds 10-12 |
| (Hong Kong) Privateer | Honda Civic | 16 | (Hong Kong) Gary Sham | Rounds 10-12 |
| (Hong Kong) Privateer | Honda Civic | 39 | (Hong Kong) Siu Tit Lung | Rounds 10-12 |
| (Taiwan) Privateer | Honda Accord | 39 | (Taiwan) Fisher Ger | Rounds 10-12 |
Division 3
| (Hong Kong) DTM Bel’Air Racing | Honda Civic | 29 | (China) Poon Tak Ming | Rounds 1-2, 5-12 |
| (Hong Kong) DTM Bel’Air Racing | Honda Civic | 29 | (Hong Kong) Chan Kai Yip | Rounds 3-4 |
| (Hong Kong) DTM Bel’Air Racing | Honda Civic | 30 | (Hong Kong) Cheng Kin Man | Rounds 1-2, 5-12 |
| (Hong Kong) DTM Bel’Air Racing | Honda Civic | 30 | (Hong Kong) Fong Sai Wai | Rounds 3-4 |
| (Hong Kong) DTM Bel’Air Racing | Honda Civic | 45 | (Hong Kong) Ben Tse | Rounds 1-2 |
| (Hong Kong) DTM Bel’Air Racing | Honda Civic | 45 | (Hong Kong) Caesar Wong | Rounds 3-4 |
| (Hong Kong) DTM Bel’Air Racing | Honda Civic | 45 | (Hong Kong) Lau Haw Yann | Rounds 5-12 |

== Race Calendar and Winners ==
| Round | Circuit | Date | Div 1 winner | Div 2 winner | Div 3 winner |
|---|---|---|---|---|---|
| 1 2 | (Malaysia) Sepang | 14 May | Franz Engstler; Franz Engstler | Eric Yeo; Eric Yeo | Ben Tse; Ben Tse |
| 3 4 | (China) Goldenport | 11 June | Franz Engstler; Michael Briggs | Henry Ho; Henry Ho | Chan Kai Yip; Chan Kai Yip |
| 5 6 | (Indonesia) Sentul | 23 July | Franz Engstler; Franz Engstler | Markus Lungstrass; Markus Lungstrass | Lau Haw Yann; Lau Haw Yann |
| 7 8 9 | (Thailand) Bira | 3 September | Franz Engstler; Franz Engstler; Franz Engstler | Cheung Chi Sing; Cheung Chi Sing; Cheung Chi Sing | Poon Tak Ming; Cheng Kin Ma; Cheng Kin Ma |
| 10 11 12 | (China) Zhuhai | 22 October | Franz Engstler; Franz Engstler; Franz Engstler | Henry Ho; Cheung Chi Sing; Henry Ho | Poon Tak Ming; Poon Tak Ming; Poon Tak Ming |

== Championship Results ==
Driver's championship-Division 1
| Position | Driver | Points |
|---|---|---|
| 1 | Franz Engstler | 165 |
| 2 | Fariqe Hairuman | 118 |
| 3 | Michael Briggs | 113 |
| 4 | Mashlino Buang | 113 |

Driver's championship-Division 2
| Position | Driver | Points |
|---|---|---|
| 1 | Henry Ho | 129 |
| 2 | Cheung Chi Sing | 114 |
| 3 | Andreas Klinge | 99 |
| 4 | Danny Stacy Chau | 91 |
| 5 | Man Ting Yu | 86 |
| 6 | George Ong | 80 |
| 7 | Poon Tak Ming | 44 |
| 8 | Cheng Kin Man | 22 |

Team's championship-Division 1
| Position | Driver | Points |
|---|---|---|
| 1 | Team Petronas | 249 |
| 2 | Engstler Motorsport | 165 |

Team's championship-Division 2
| Position | Driver | Points |
|---|---|---|
| 1 | DTM Bel'Air Racing | 293 |
| 2 | Engstler Motorsport | 143 |
