= BMW P60B40 =

BMW P60B40 engine
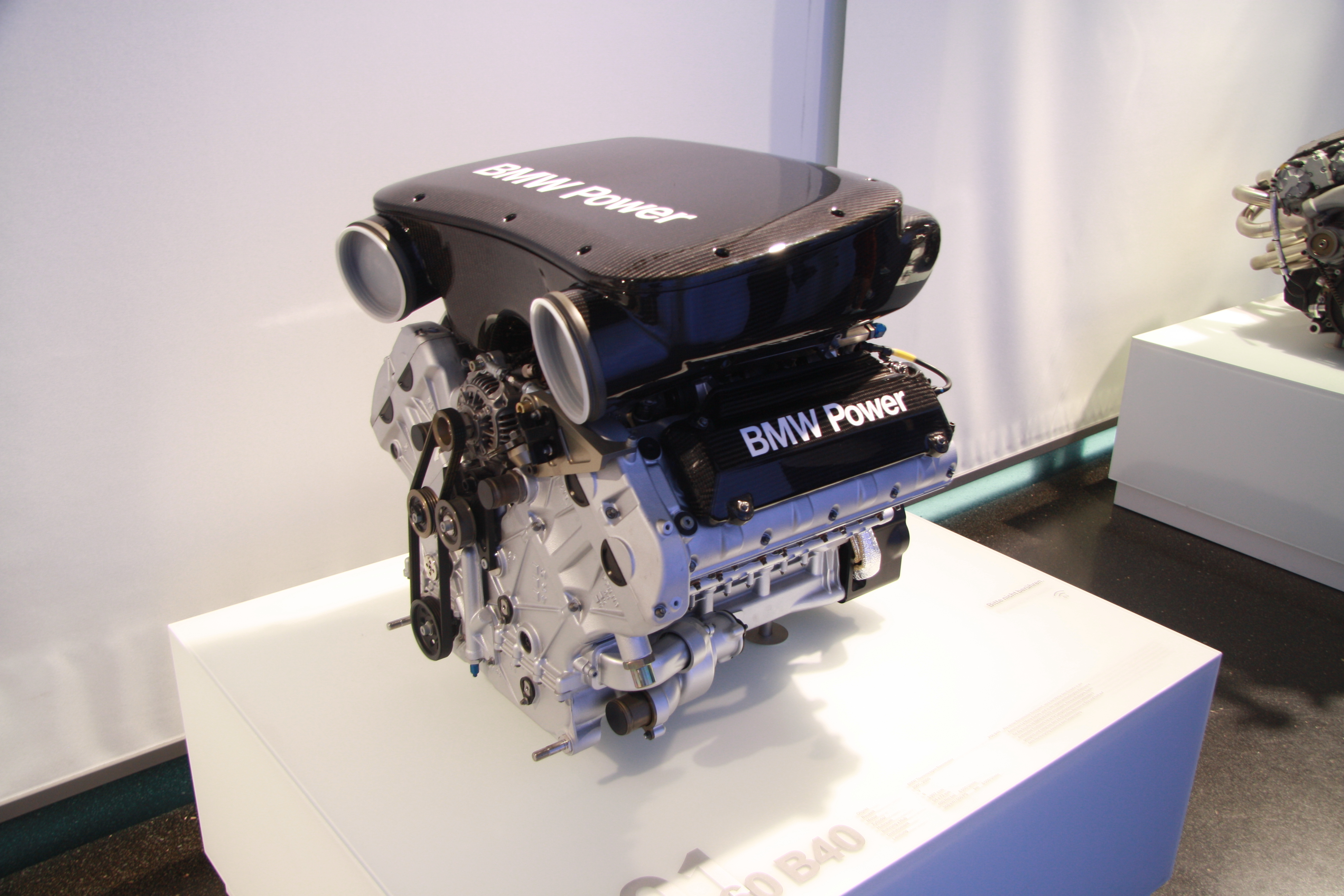

Overview
- Manufacturer: BMW M GmbH
- Production: 2001–2005

Layout
- Configuration: Naturally aspirated 90° V8
- Displacement: 4.0 L; 243.9 cu in (3,997 cc)
- Cylinder bore: 94 mm (3.70 in)
- Piston stroke: 72 mm (2.83 in)
- Cylinder block material: Aluminium
- Cylinder head material: Aluminium
- Valvetrain: DOHC 4 valves x cyl.
- Compression ratio: 12.0:1

Combustion
- Fuel system: Multi-port fuel injection
- Management: BMW Motorsport
- Fuel type: Gasoline
- Oil system: Dry sump
- Cooling system: Water-cooled

Output
- Power output: 650–700 bhp (485–522 kW; 659–710 PS) (M3 GTR race car; unrestricted); 444–500 bhp (331–373 kW; 450–507 PS) (M3 GTR race car; using 2x 30.4 mm (1.2 in) air intake restrictors); 380 bhp (283 kW; 385 PS) (M3 GTR Straßen Version)
- Specific power: 111.1 bhp (82.8 kW; 112.6 PS)
- Torque output: 380–670 N⋅m (280–494 lb⋅ft)

The P60B40 is a naturally aspirated DOHC V8 engine, designed, developed and produced by BMW, for sports car racing, between 2001 and 2005.

== Usage ==
=== M3 GTR ===
The P60B40 was the powertrain for the BMW E46 M3 GTR from 2001 to 2005. The BMW M3 GTR competed in the GT Class of the American Le Mans Series in 2001. There was opposition to the car being allowed to race, rivals stated that the car was a prototype as a road going version was not available to buy. As a result of the complaints, the regulations were modified for the 2001 Le Mans 24-hour race (and the American Le Mans Series), stating that a car had to be for sale on two continents within twelve months of the rules being issued. BMW complied (leading to the M3 GTR Road Version), however, the ALMS rules were modified again in 2002 to state that there must be a minimum of 100 cars and 1,000 engines built in order for a car to compete without penalties. BMW made the decision to pull the car rather than meet the requirements or race with the penalties, ending production of the E46 M3 GTR and the P60B40 along with it.

=== M3 GTR road version ===
In order for the M3 GTR race car to compete in the American Le Mans Series, BMW produced 10 examples of the "M3 GTR Straßen Version" road car in 2001. As per the race M3 GTR, the roadgoing Version was powered by the BMW P60B40 4.0 L V8 engine. The P60B40 was detuned for the road version from 444 bhp (331 kW; 450 PS) to 380 bhp (283 kW; 385 PS).

== Specifications ==
4-stroke, longitudinally-mounted FR layout

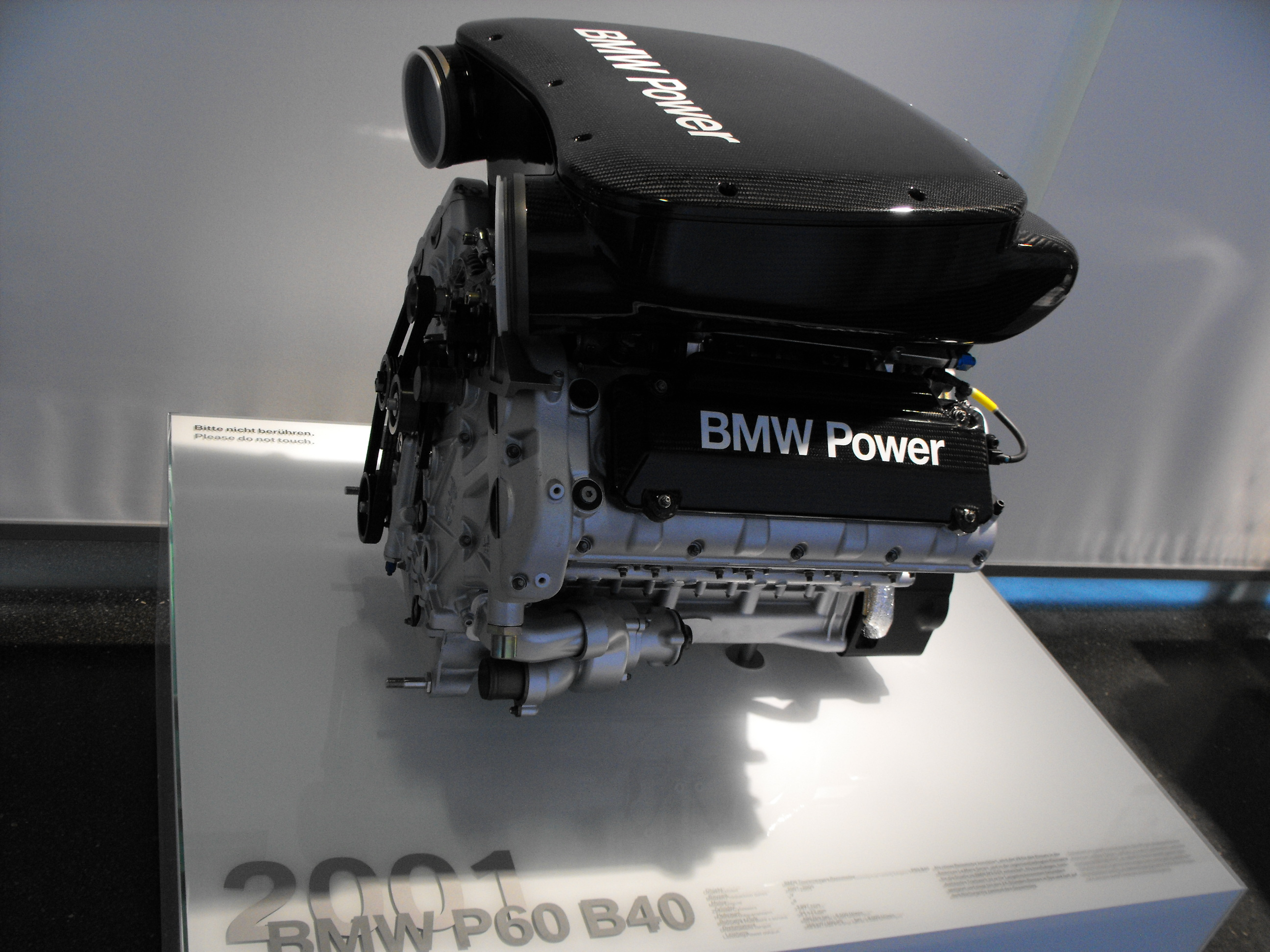
P60B40 on display at the BMW Museum

Power: 444 bhp (331 kW; 450 PS) at 7,500 rpm (M3 GTR race car), 380 bhp (283 kW; 385 PS) (M3 GTR Straßen Version)

Torque: 480 N⋅m (354 lb⋅ft) at 5,500 rpm

5 main bearings, flat-plane crankshaft

Firing order: 1-8-3-6-4-5-2-7
