= BMW M56 =

Internal combustion engine

The BMW M56 is a 2.5-liter 184-PS (135 kW; 181 bhp) straight-six engine. It is a re-engineered version of the BMW M54B25 engine, manufactured in order to meet SULEV regulations in US states until 2006. The M56 was replaced by the BMW N54, which was BMW's first mass-produced turbocharged petrol engine.

== Background ==
The updated 2.5-liter engine, designated M56B25, was produced between 2002 and 2006. It was the first BMW Super Ultra Low Emission Vehicles (SULEV).

The M56B25 power output and vehicle performance were the same as the comparable model equipped with the M54B25 engine (US only). M56 SULEV models listed above were sold in California, New York, and Massachusetts as 2003 models and in Vermont starting in the 2004 model year.

In addition, these vehicles were certified as partial zero-emissions vehicles (PZEV): The vehicles meet the SULEV tailpipe emission standard, which is approximately 1/5 of the ULEV standard. The vehicles conform to the Zero Evaporative Emissions requirements.

== Models ==
From 2003 to 2006—325iA (E46) sedan, coupe and sport wagon with automatic or a manual transmission.

== Market ==
Sales of this model started in 2003. The E46 SULEV has only been sold in 4 states in the US: California, New York, Massachusetts, and later in 2004 in Vermont.

== Specifications ==
- HC block in the air intake system:
  - Hydrocarbon escape via the intake system is prevented due to the use of an additional carbon filter incorporated in the air filter housing and a "closed" throttle valve actuator.
- Fuel system components:
  - All metal fuel system components (fuel rail, injectors, tank ventilation valve, etc.) are made of stainless steel and are fastened together using coupling-type connectors.
- Fuel tank and tank ventilation system:
  - The fuel tank, tank filler neck, and evaporative canister are made of stainless steel. Both the fuel pump and fuel filter are completely sealed inside the gas tank and require a complete replacement of the gas tank if either the fuel pump or filter fail.
- Crankcase ventilation system:
  - The crankcase ventilation valve is incorporated in the aluminum cylinder head cover.
- System components used to achieve SULEV tailpipe emission requirements:
1. Dual downstream catalytic converters
2. "Warm up" catalytic converters—high-cell-density technology
3. Upstream oxygen sensors—wide band technology
4. Pistons—only 3mm fire land
5. VANOS—set to fixed position during start up for improved engine start
6. New-style fuel injectors—4-hole design (5-bar fuel pressure)
- Secondary air system with secondary air mass flow sensor used for improved monitoring of secondary air flow.

In addition, SULEV models also incorporate a "Direct Ozone Reduction System". The external heat exchange surfaces of the radiator are coated with a catalyst that reduces the ozone in the ambient air drawn through the radiator.

=== BMW M56 SULEV Gallery ===
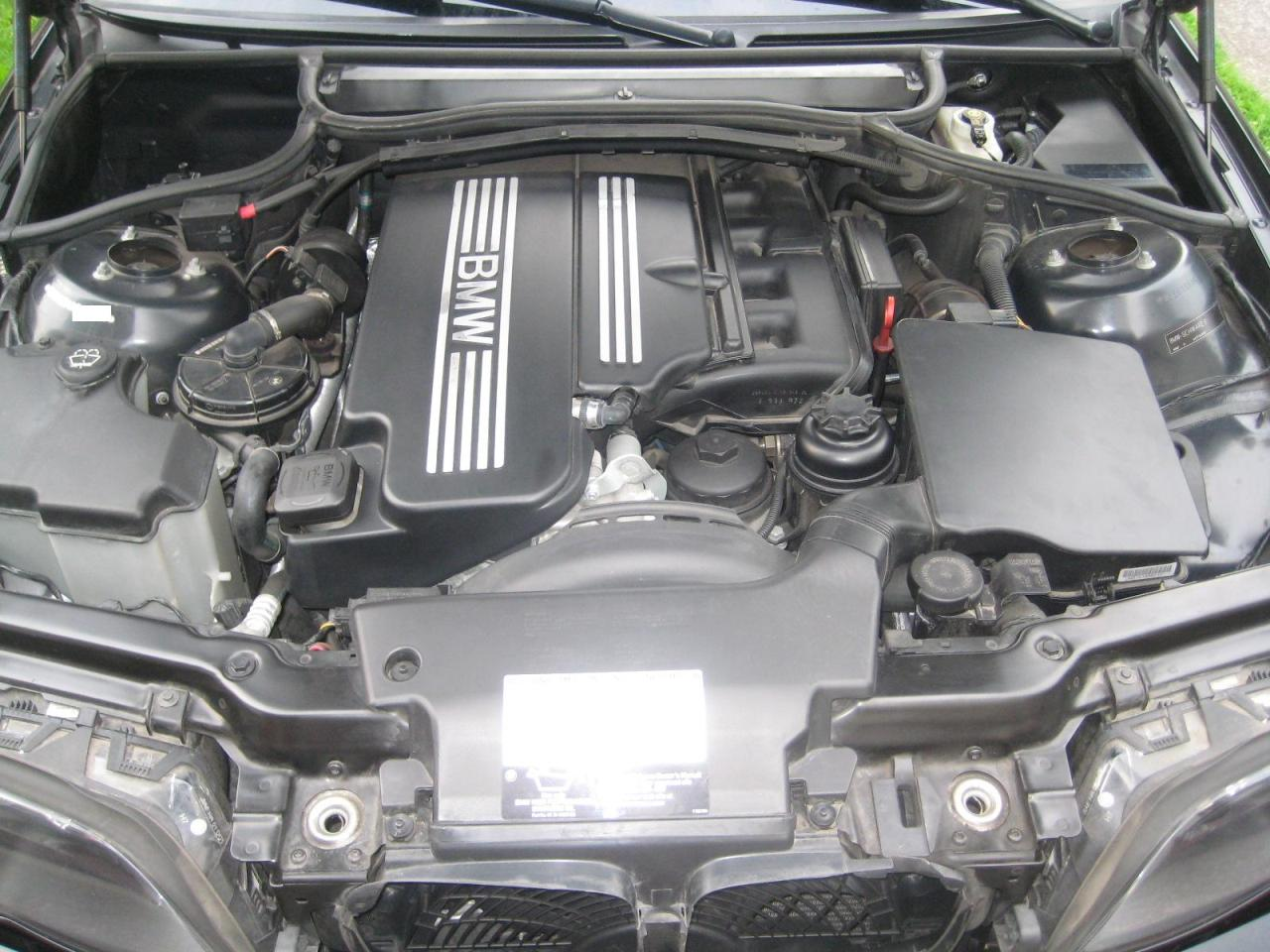
Engine bay of a 2004 325i SULEV

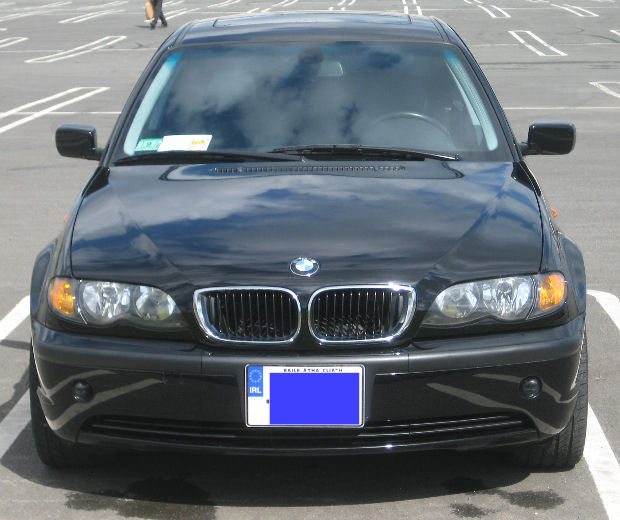
A rare 325i SULEV with M56 engine imported in Ireland by an individual

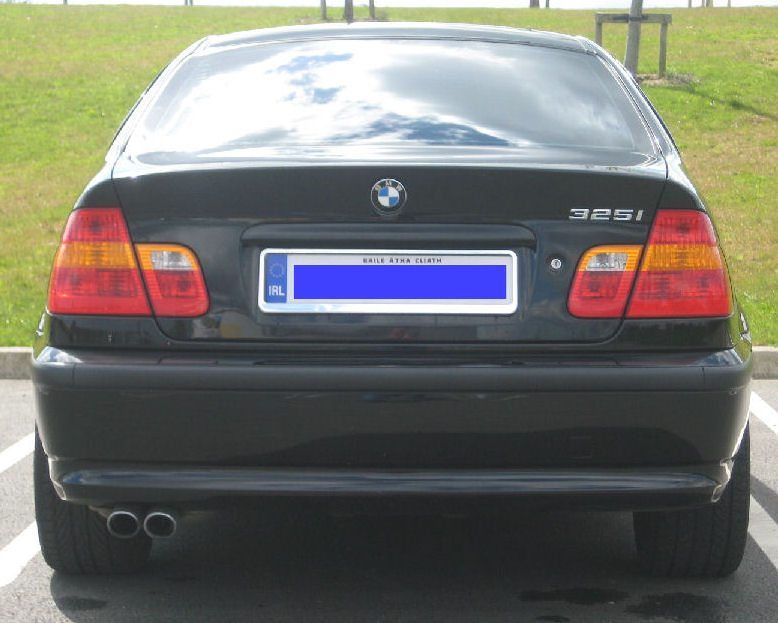
A rare 325i SULEV with M56 engine imported in Ireland by an individual

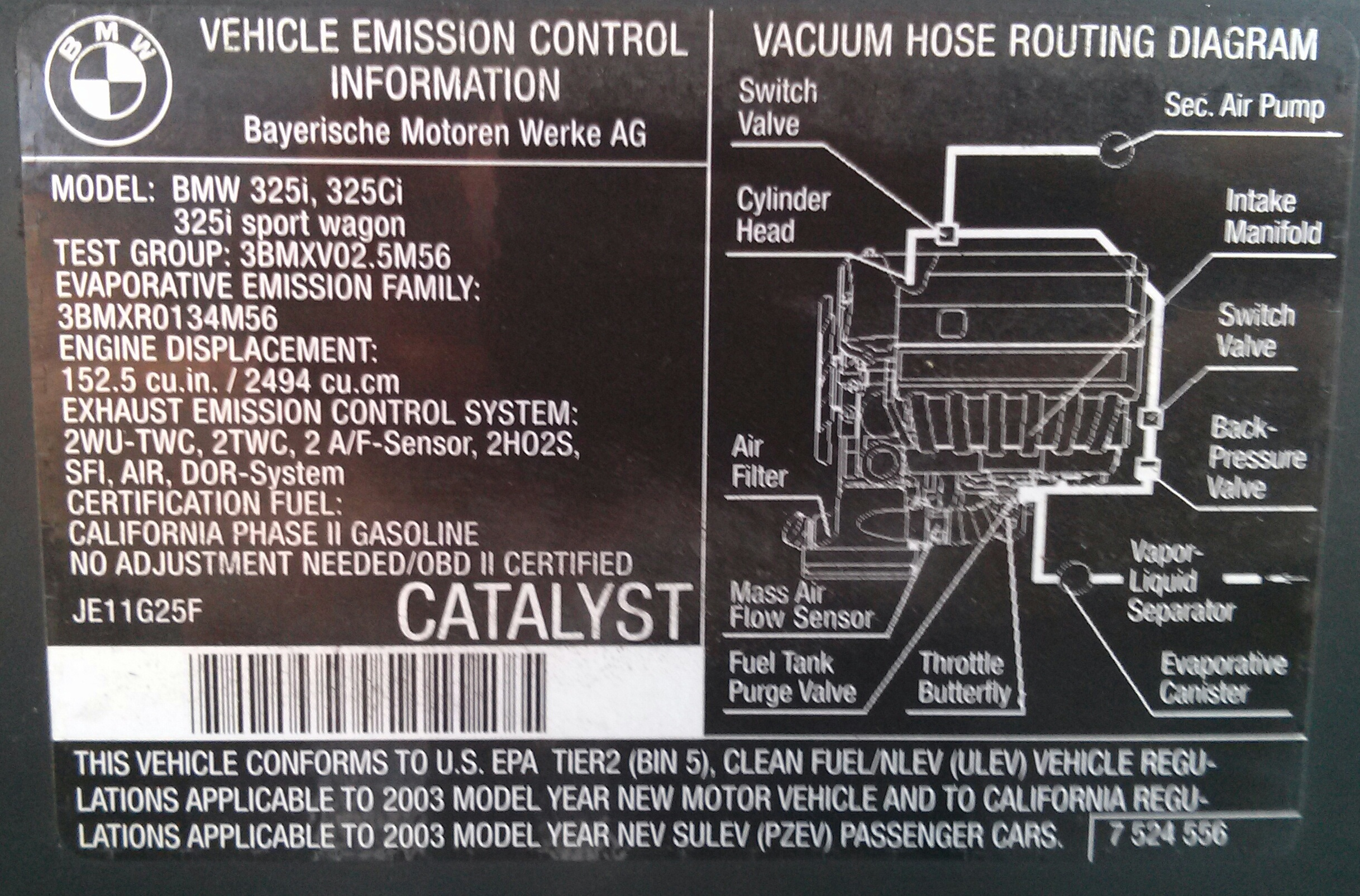
Information label on the underside of the hood of an E46 SULEV

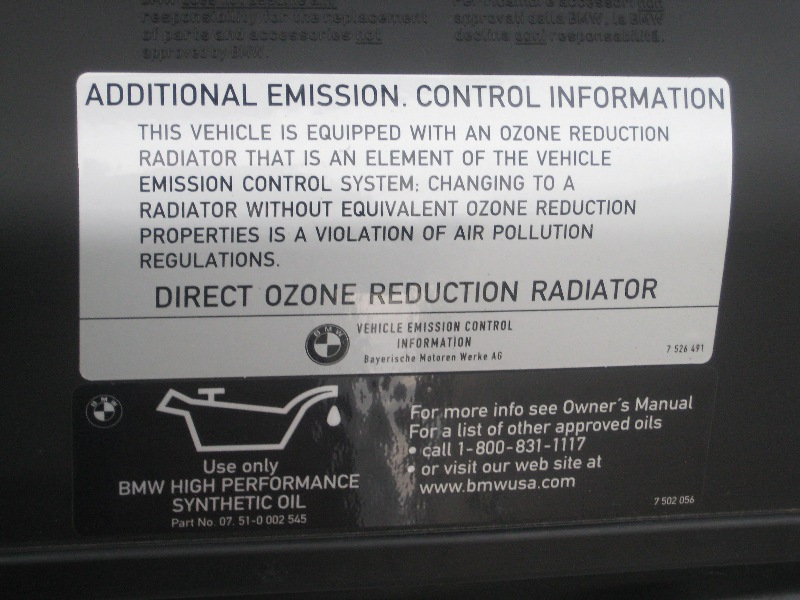
Information label about the SULEV radiator, located on the frontmost part of the air intake.
