= 2012 FIA WTCC Race of Morocco =

2012 Race of Morocco
Race details
- Round 3 of 12 in the 2012 World Touring Car Championship at Marrakech Street Circuit in Marrakesh, Morocco.
- Date: 15 April, 2012
- Location: Marrakesh, Morocco
- Course: Marrakech Street Circuit; 4.545 kilometres (2.824 mi)

Race One
- Laps: 11
Pole position
Driver		(Switzerland) Alain Menu	Chevrolet
Time		1:43.901	
Podium
First		(Switzerland) Alain Menu	Chevrolet
Second		(United Kingdom) Robert Huff	Chevrolet
Third		(France) Yvan Muller	Chevrolet
Fastest Lap
Driver		(Spain) Pepe Oriola	Tuenti Racing
Time		1:44.617	

Race Two
- Laps: 11
Podium
First		(France) Yvan Muller	Chevrolet
Second		(United Kingdom) Robert Huff	Chevrolet
Third		(Switzerland) Alain Menu	Chevrolet
Fastest Lap
Driver		(Switzerland) Alain Menu	Chevrolet
Time		1:45.161	

The 2012 FIA WTCC Race of Morocco was the third round of the 2012 World Touring Car Championship season and the third running of the FIA WTCC Race of Morocco. It was held on 15 April 2012 at Marrakech Street Circuit in Marrakesh, Morocco. Both races were won by Chevrolet with Alain Menu winning race one and Yvan Muller winning race two.

== Background ==
After Valencia it was Chevrolet driver Yvan Muller who was leading the championship, 27 points clear of his nearest rival Menu who was three points clear of ROAL Motorsport driver Tom Coronel. Pepe Oriola was leading the Yokohama Independents' Trophy.

Having made his WTCC debut at Valencia, Fernando Monje would not return to race at Marrakesh in preparation for his return to the European Touring Car Cup at the Slovakiaring. Gábor Wéber would also miss the event due to financial concerns, leaving Norbert Michelisz as the sole driver for Zengő Motorsport.

== Report ==
=== Free Practice ===
Lukoil Racing Team's Gabriele Tarquini was fastest in the first free practice session ahead of the Chevrolets of Yvan Muller and Robert Huff. Team AON's Tom Chilton was a surprise fourth fastest, backing up his performance from Fridays test session. Franz Engstler was the fastest of the BMWs.

In the second session it was Menu was topped the times, his teammates Muller and Huff were second and third once again. Tarquini was the fastest SEAT in fourth ahead of Oriola and the Ford Focus of Chilton in sixth.

=== Qualifying ===
Menu continued his pace from the second free practice session to take pole position by 0.028s ahead of Huff. Muller and Coronel set benchmark times early on in Q2 but they had to settle for fourth and third respectively. Tiago Monteiro was tenth and looked to take pole position for race two. After Tarquini was removed from qualifying for running an underweight car, James Nash moved up to take pole position for race two.

=== Warm-Up ===
Yvan Muller was fastest in the Sunday morning warm up session with pole sitter Menu in fourth.

=== Race One ===
The Chevrolet trio of Menu, Huff and Muller led away from the start while behind them, Oriola made a great getaway and got ahead of Coronel for fourth. Local driver Mehdi Bennani and James Nash collided at the first turn, forcing both to retire. There was a brief scare for Alex MacDowall when he missed the braking point at turn 5 in his bamboo-engineering Chevrolet Cruze and collected the BMW of Coronel, both escaped any series damage and continued. The safety car was deployed while the stricken Ford of Nash was recovered with the race resuming on lap three. Isaac Tutumlu crashed his Proteam Racing into the wall at turn 4 and retired. On lap 5, Monteiro retired with gearbox problems in his SUNRED León. Menu led a Chevrolet 1-2-3 with Oriola the Yokohama Trophy winner in fourth. Chilton scored Ford's maiden points in the WTCC with a seventh-place finish.

=== Race Two ===
Nash led away from pole position while Coronel jumped up from eighth on the grid to third behind Engstler at the first corner. Chilton collected the rear bumper of Monteiro and dropped back down the field. Nash had to defend well from the BMW of Engstler until the German was overtaken by the Chevrolets of Muller and Huff on lap 4. On the following lap the two leading Chevrolets demoted Nash to third, one lap further on Menu also overtook the 2011 British Touring Car Championship Independents' Champion to secure third. Nash succumbed to attacks from Coronel and Stefano D'Aste on lap 9, while his teammate Chilton retired with turbo problems. At the finish, Muller led another Chevrolet 1-2-3 in reverse of the order they finished race one, D'Aste was the winning independent in fourth place and pole sitter Nash eventually finished sixth. After the race, the stewards issued bamboo-engineering driver Pasquale di Sabatino with a 30-second penalty for repeatedly cutting the chicanes, this dropped him from 12th to 15th in the classification.

== Results ==
=== Qualifying ===
Pos.	No.	Name	Team	Car	C	Q1	Q2	Points
1	8	(Switzerland) Alain Menu	Chevrolet	Chevrolet Cruze 1.6T		1:43.753	1:43.901	**5**
2	2	(United Kingdom) Robert Huff	Chevrolet	Chevrolet Cruze 1.6T		1:44.973	1:43.929	**4**
3	15	(Netherlands) Tom Coronel	ROAL Motorsport	BMW 320 TC		1:45.000	1:43.968	**3**
4	1	(France) Yvan Muller	Chevrolet	Chevrolet Cruze 1.6T		1:44.482	1:44.201	**2**
5	74	(Spain) Pepe Oriola	Tuenti Racing	SEAT León WTCC	Y	1:44.919	1:44.498	**1**
6	11	(United Kingdom) Alex MacDowall	bamboo-engineering	Chevrolet Cruze 1.6T	Y	1:45.281	1:44.544	
7	23	(United Kingdom) Tom Chilton	Team Aon	Ford Focus S2000 TC		1:44.638	1:44.681	
8	6	(Germany) Franz Engstler	Liqui Moly Team Engstler	BMW 320 TC	Y	1:45.125	1:44.822	
9	18	(Portugal) Tiago Monteiro	Tuenti Racing	SR León 1.6T		1:44.966	1:44.870	
10	14	(United Kingdom) **James Nash**	Team Aon	Ford Focus S2000 TC		1:45.137	1:44.982	
11	26	(Italy) Stefano D'Aste	Wiechers-Sport	BMW 320 TC	Y	1:45.178	1:51.464	
12	3	(Italy) Gabriele Tarquini	Lukoil Racing	SEAT León WTCC		1:45.378	DSQ	
13	5	(Hungary) Norbert Michelisz	Zengő Motorsport	BMW 320 TC	Y	1:45.495	DNQ	
14	12	(Italy) Pasquale di Sabatino	bamboo-engineering	Chevrolet Cruze 1.6T	Y	1:45.692	DNQ	
15	25	(Morocco) Mehdi Bennani	Proteam Racing	BMW 320 TC	Y	1:45.707	DNQ	
16	20	(China) Darryl O'Young	Special Tuning Racing	SEAT León WTCC	Y	1:45.834	DNQ	
17	7	(Hong Kong) Charles Ng	Liqui Moly Team Engstler	BMW 320 TC	Y	1:45.965	DNQ	
18	16	(Italy) Alberto Cerqui	ROAL Motorsport	BMW 320 TC	Y	1:46.041	DNQ	
19	22	(United Kingdom) Tom Boardman	Special Tuning Racing	SEAT León TDi	Y	1:46.562	DNQ	
20	24	(Spain) Isaac Tutumlu	Proteam Racing	BMW 320 TC	Y	1:47.294	DNQ	
21	40	(Belgium) Andrea Barlesi	SUNRED Engineering	SR León 1.6T	Y	1:47.872	DNQ	
	4	(Russia) Aleksei Dudukalo	Lukoil Racing	SEAT León WTCC	Y	2:49.620	DNQ	

- **Bold** denotes Pole position for second race.

=== Race 1 ===
Pos.	No.	Name	Team	Car	C	Laps	Time/Retired	Grid	Points
1	8	(Switzerland) Alain Menu	Chevrolet	Chevrolet Cruze 1.6T		12	22.28.931	1	25
2	2	(United Kingdom) Robert Huff	Chevrolet	Chevrolet Cruze 1.6T		12	+1.074	2	18
3	1	(France) Yvan Muller	Chevrolet	Chevrolet Cruze 1.6T		12	+1.554	4	15
4	74	(Spain) **Pepe Oriola**	Tuenti Racing	SEAT León WTCC	Y	12	+2.268	5	12
5	26	(Italy) Stefano D'Aste	Wiechers-Sport	BMW 320 TC	Y	12	+5.713	11	10
6	6	(Germany) Franz Engstler	Liqui Moly Team Engstler	BMW 320 TC	Y	12	+8.075	8	8
7	23	(United Kingdom) Tom Chilton	Team Aon	Ford Focus S2000 TC		12	+9.290	7	6
8	15	(Netherlands) Tom Coronel	ROAL Motorsport	BMW 320 TC		12	+16.069	3	4
9	5	(Hungary) Norbert Michelisz	Zengő Motorsport	BMW 320 TC	Y	12	+17.696	13	2
10	20	(China) Darryl O'Young	Special Tuning Racing	SEAT León WTCC	Y	12	+19.284	16	1
11	3	(Italy) Gabriele Tarquini	Lukoil Racing	SEAT León WTCC		12	+26.413	12	
12	11	(United Kingdom) Alex MacDowall	bamboo-engineering	Chevrolet Cruze 1.6T	Y	12	+38.647	6	
13	40	(Belgium) Andrea Barlesi	SUNRED Engineering	SR León 1.6T	Y	12	+44.139	20	
14	22	(United Kingdom) Tom Boardman	Special Tuning Racing	SEAT León TDi	Y	12	+48.598	18	
15	16	(Italy) Alberto Cerqui	ROAL Motorsport	BMW 320 TC	Y	12	+50.097	21	
16	4	(Russia) Aleksei Dudukalo	Lukoil Racing	SEAT León WTCC	Y	12	+50.377	22	
17	12	(Italy) Pasquale di Sabatino	bamboo-engineering	Chevrolet Cruze 1.6T	Y	11	+1 Lap	14	
NC	18	(Portugal) Tiago Monteiro	Tuenti Racing	SR León 1.6T		7	+5 Laps	9	
Ret	7	(Hong Kong) Charles Ng	Liqui Moly Team Engstler	BMW 320 TC	Y	6	Engine	17	
Ret	24	(Spain) Isaac Tutumlu	Proteam Racing	BMW 320 TC	Y	2	Collision	19	
Ret	25	(Morocco) Mehdi Bennani	Proteam Racing	BMW 320 TC	Y	2	Collision	15	
Ret	14	(United Kingdom) James Nash	Team Aon	Ford Focus S2000 TC		0	Collision	10	

- **Bold** denotes Fastest lap.

=== Race 2 ===
Pos.	No.	Name	Team	Car	C	Laps	Time/Retired	Grid	Points
1	1	(France) Yvan Muller	Chevrolet	Chevrolet Cruze 1.6T		11	19:36.836	7	25
2	2	(United Kingdom) Robert Huff	Chevrolet	Chevrolet Cruze 1.6T		11	+0.381	9	18
3	8	(Switzerland) **Alain Menu**	Chevrolet	Chevrolet Cruze 1.6T		11	+0.970	10	15
4	15	(Netherlands) Tom Coronel	ROAL Motorsport	BMW 320 TC		11	+2.153	8	12
5	26	(Italy) Stefano D'Aste	Wiechers-Sport	BMW 320 TC	Y	11	+2.641	11	10
6	14	(United Kingdom) James Nash	Team Aon	Ford Focus S2000 TC		11	+5.052	1	8
7	74	(Spain) Pepe Oriola	Tuenti Racing	SEAT León WTCC	Y	11	+5.589	6	6
8	6	(Germany) Franz Engstler	Liqui Moly Team Engstler	BMW 320 TC	Y	11	+5.610	3	4
9	18	(Portugal) Tiago Monteiro	Tuenti Racing	SR León 1.6T		11	+7.374	2	2
10	20	(China) Darryl O'Young	Special Tuning Racing	SEAT León WTCC	Y	11	+12.861	15	1
11	4	(Russia) Aleksei Dudukalo	Lukoil Racing	SEAT León WTCC	Y	11	+13.587	21	
12	25	(Morocco) Mehdi Bennani	Proteam Racing	BMW 320 TC	Y	11	+18.629	20	
13	7	(Hong Kong) Charles Ng	Liqui Moly Team Engstler	BMW 320 TC	Y	11	+29.173	16	
14	40	(Belgium) Andrea Barlesi	SUNRED Engineering	SR León 1.6T	Y	11	+31.619	19	
15	12	(Italy) Pasquale di Sabatino	bamboo-engineering	Chevrolet Cruze 1.6T	Y	11	+44.273	14	
16	23	(United Kingdom) Tom Chilton	Team Aon	Ford Focus S2000 TC		8	+3 Laps	4	
Ret	5	(Hungary) Norbert Michelisz	Zengő Motorsport	BMW 320 TC	Y	5	Suspension	13	
Ret	16	(Italy) Alberto Cerqui	ROAL Motorsport	BMW 320 TC	Y	2	Driveshaft	17	
Ret	11	(United Kingdom) Alex MacDowall	bamboo-engineering	Chevrolet Cruze 1.6T	Y	0	Driveshaft	5	
Ret	3	(Italy) Gabriele Tarquini	Lukoil Racing	SEAT León WTCC		0	Suspension	12	
DNS	22	(United Kingdom) Tom Boardman	Special Tuning Racing	SEAT León TDi	Y	0	Withdrew		
DNS	24	(Spain) Isaac Tutumlu	Proteam Racing	BMW 320 TC	Y	0	Collision damage	18	

- **Bold** denotes Fastest lap.

== Standings after the race ==
Drivers' Championship standings

	Pos	Driver	Points
	1	(France) Yvan Muller	130
	2	(Switzerland) Alain Menu	106
1	3	(United Kingdom) Robert Huff	97
1	4	(Netherlands) Tom Coronel	77
1	5	(Italy) Stefano D'Aste	45

Yokohama Independents' Trophy standings

	Pos	Driver	Points
	1	(Spain) Pepe Oriola	51
	2	(Italy) Stefano D'Aste	47
1	3	(Germany) Franz Engstler	37
1	4	(Hungary) Norbert Michelisz	32
	5	(United Kingdom) Alex MacDowall	19

Manufacturers' Championship standings

Pos	Manufacturer	Points
1	(United States) Chevrolet	268
2	(Germany) BMW Customer Racing Teams	161
3	(Spain) SEAT Racing Technology	144

- Note: Only the top five positions are included for both sets of drivers' standings.
