= 2012 FIA WTCC Race of Italy =

2012 Race of Italy
Race details
- Round 1 of 12 in the 2012 World Touring Car Championship at Autodromo Nazionale di Monza in Monza, Italy.
- Date: 11 March, 2012
- Location: Monza, Italy
- Course: Autodromo Nazionale di Monza; 5.793 kilometres (3.600 mi)

Race One
- Laps: 9
Pole position
Driver		(Italy) Gabriele Tarquini	Lukoil Racing Team
Time		1:57.917	
Podium
First		(France) Yvan Muller	Chevrolet
Second		(United Kingdom) Robert Huff	Chevrolet
Third		(Italy) Gabriele Tarquini	Lukoil Racing Team
Fastest Lap
Driver		(Sweden) Rickard Rydell	Chevrolet Motorsport Sweden
Time		1:59.116	

Race Two
- Laps: 9
Podium
First		(France) Yvan Muller	Chevrolet
Second		(Switzerland) Alain Menu	Chevrolet
Third		(United Kingdom) Robert Huff	Chevrolet
Fastest Lap
Driver		(United Kingdom) Robert Huff	Chevrolet
Time		1:59.000	

The 2012 FIA WTCC Race of Italy was the opening round of the 2012 World Touring Car Championship season and the eighth running of the FIA WTCC Race of Italy. It was held on 11 March 2012 at the Autodromo Nazionale di Monza in Monza, Italy. Lukoil Racing driver Gabriele Tarquini took pole position for the first race, with Zengő Motorsport's Norbert Michelisz on pole for the second race after the top ten qualifiers were reversed. Both races were won by Yvan Muller for Chevrolet.

== Background ==
Chevrolet and BMW would once again be represented on the grid while SEAT returned with an official customer programme. Ford would also be on the grid courtesy of the independently run Team Aon Ford Focus driven by Tom Chilton and James Nash.

Chevrolet retained their lineup of defending drivers' champion Yvan Muller, Robert Huff and Alain Menu. Darryl O'Young switched from bamboo-engineering to Special Tuning Racing. He was to be joined by Tom Boardman but due to a shortage of the new Oreca built SEAT 1.6T engine his return to the championship was delayed until the Race of Spain. 2011 STCC champion Rickard Rydell returned to the championship for the first round of the season driving a Chevrolet Motorsport Sweden Chevrolet Cruze 1.6T. Gábor Wéber joined Norbert Michelisz at Zengő Motorsport, Alex MacDowall and Pasquale di Sabatino lined up at bamboo-engineering and former Superstars Series driver Alberto Cerqui joined Tom Coronel at ROAL Motorsport. Charles Ng returned to Liqui Moly Team Engstler for a full season having raced for the team at the end of 2011. Andrea Barlesi joined SUNRED Engineering in an old specification SEAT León TDI and Isaac Tutumlu joined Mehdi Bennani at Proteam Racing.

The qualifying format was changed prior to the event, with 12 cars progressing through to Q2 where the top 5 cars would score points. The top ten cars in Q2 would then be reversed to form the race two grid.

== Report ==
=== Free Practice ===
Chevrolet cars dominated the free testing session on Thursday; Muller led Huff, Menu, series rookie MacDowall and Rydell at the top of the times while Michelisz was best of the rest in his BMW 320 TC.

Track action resumed on Saturday morning when Huff set the fastest time in the works Chevrolet in Free Practice 1, 0.241 seconds ahead of the Lukoil Racing Team SEAT of Gabriele Tarquini. The session was briefly stopped to clear oil from the track which had caught out Pepe Oriola and Tom Chilton.

It was the turn of Menu to set the fastest time in the second free practice session, setting his fastest time at the beginning of the session and remaining there until the end. Tarquini was second once again with the SEAT producing consistent straight line speed. Although the session was not stopped, yellow flags went out as the SEAT of Barlesi was removed from the gravel trap at the Parabolica.

=== Qualifying ===
Tarquini took pole position, the first non-Chevrolet pole since the 2010 Race of Spain, where pole was also taken by Tarquini in a SEAT. Muller would start on the front row but he only made it into Q2 thanks to a tow from his team mates, who lined up behind him on the second row. Q1 had been red flagged with under two minutes remaining as the ROAL Motorsport car of Cerqui ended up in the gravel trap at the Parabolica. The session was restarted but without enough time to complete a timed lap so most of the cars remained in the pits. Twelve cars progressed to Q2 with Oriola taking the independents' trophy pole and Michelisz claiming the reversed grid pole for race two.

=== Warm-Up ===
Muller was fastest in the Sunday morning warm up session, that was stopped due to a fire for Special Tuning Racing driver O'Young. He stopped the car and evacuated; the damage was enough to rule him out of participating in the rest of the weekend.

=== Race One ===
Tarquini started from pole but was soon passed by Muller. A mistake by Muller at the end of the lap allowed Tarquini to regain the lead but the positions switched back on lap two. Huff later passed Tarquini for second to seal a Chevrolet 1–2. A first lap collision forced Tiago Monteiro to retire and delayed Stefano D'Aste and Franz Engstler. Rydell ran as high as third during the race but had to settle for fourth at the end, ahead of Coronel and independents' trophy winner Oriola. Menu finished a distant seventh from his team mates and MacDowall was the top rookie with eighth.

=== Race Two ===
Michelisz started on the reversed grid pole position and escaped many of the tangles that caught out some of the more experienced drivers behind him. A second lap nudge from Huff approaching the first chicane sent Muller into a spin and caught out Tarquini behind. Muller went through the chicane and across the grass backwards but he recovered without losing much time while Tarquini punctured a tyre and retired. From there, Muller picked off the cars ahead one at a time to catch up with race leader Michelisz. Passing Michelisz proved difficult and at one point, third placed Coronel was able to take second from Muller before losing it again shortly after. Michelisz struck a pigeon on lap seven and Muller passed him later on that lap. Michelisz lost some pace after this and dropped down the order, to fifth by the end of the lap, eventually finishing eighth. Rydell had a bad start and recovered to tenth place to score another point in his one off outing. Muller led a Chevrolet 1–2–3 with Menu second and Huff third; D'Aste was the Yokohama Trophy winner after finishing fifth.

== Results ==
=== Qualifying ===
Pos.	No.	Name	Team	Car	C	Q1	Q2	Points
1	3	(Italy) Gabriele Tarquini	Lukoil Racing	SEAT León WTCC		1:58.004	1:57.915	**5**
2	1	(France) Yvan Muller	Chevrolet	Chevrolet Cruze 1.6T		1:58.191	1:57.974	**4**
3	2	(United Kingdom) Robert Huff	Chevrolet	Chevrolet Cruze 1.6T		1:58.243	1:58.106	**3**
4	8	(Switzerland) Alain Menu	Chevrolet	Chevrolet Cruze 1.6T		1:58.527	1:58.200	**2**
5	9	(Sweden) Rickard Rydell	Chevrolet Motorsport Sweden	Chevrolet Cruze 1.6T		1:59.144	1:58.319	**1**
6	15	(Netherlands) Tom Coronel	ROAL Motorsport	BMW 320 TC		1:59.120	1:58.389	
7	74	(Spain) Pepe Oriola	Tuenti Racing	SEAT León WTCC	Y	1:58.532	1:58.412	
8	11	(United Kingdom) Alex MacDowall	bamboo-engineering	Chevrolet Cruze 1.6T	Y	1:59.262	1:58.507	
9	4	(Russia) Aleksei Dudukalo	Lukoil Racing	SEAT León WTCC	Y	1:58.942	1:58.649	
10	5	(Hungary) **Norbert Michelisz**	Zengő Motorsport	BMW 320 TC	Y	1:58.524	1:58.652	
11	26	(Italy) Stefano D'Aste	Wiechers-Sport	BMW 320 TC	Y	1:59.187	1:58.931	
12	27	(Hungary) Gábor Wéber	Zengő Motorsport	BMW 320 TC	Y	1:59.350	1:59.348	
13	6	(Germany) Franz Engstler	Liqui Moly Team Engstler	BMW 320 TC	Y	1:59.435		
14	14	(United Kingdom) James Nash	Team Aon	Ford Focus S2000 TC		1:59.563		
15	23	(United Kingdom) Tom Chilton	Team Aon	Ford Focus S2000 TC		1:59.723		
16	18	(Portugal) Tiago Monteiro	Tuenti Racing	SEAT León TDi		1:59.743		
17	16	(Italy) Alberto Cerqui	ROAL Motorsport	BMW 320 TC	Y	1:59.841		
18	12	(Italy) Pasquale Di Sabatino	bamboo-engineering	Chevrolet Cruze 1.6T	Y	1:59.891		
19	7	(Hong Kong) Charles Ng	Liqui Moly Team Engstler	BMW 320 TC	Y	1:59.949		
20	25	(Morocco) Mehdi Bennani	Proteam Racing	BMW 320 TC	Y	2:00.300		
21	40	(Belgium) Andrea Barlesi	SUNRED Engineering	SEAT León TDI	Y	2:00.394		
22	24	(Spain) Isaac Tutumlu	Proteam Racing	BMW 320 TC	Y	2:01.333		
23	20	(Hong Kong) Darryl O'Young	Special Tuning Racing	SEAT León WTCC	Y	No time		

- **Bold** denotes Pole position for second race.

=== Race 1 ===
Pos.	No.	Name	Team	Car	C	Laps	Time/Retired	Grid	Points
1	1	(France) Yvan Muller	Chevrolet	Chevrolet Cruze 1.6T		12	26:01.705	2	25
2	2	(United Kingdom) Robert Huff	Chevrolet	Chevrolet Cruze 1.6T		12	+0.446	3	18
3	3	(Italy) Gabriele Tarquini	Lukoil Racing	SEAT León WTCC		12	+2.305	1	15
4	9	(Sweden) **Rickard Rydell**	Chevrolet Motorsport Sweden	Chevrolet Cruze 1.6T		12	+2.745	5	12
5	15	(Netherlands) Tom Coronel	ROAL Motorsport	BMW 320 TC		12	+3.796	6	10
6	74	(Spain) Pepe Oriola	Tuenti Racing	SEAT León WTCC	Y	12	+6.111	7	8
7	8	(Switzerland) Alain Menu	Chevrolet	Chevrolet Cruze 1.6T		12	+6.326	4	6
8	11	(United Kingdom) Alex MacDowall	bamboo-engineering	Chevrolet Cruze 1.6T	Y	12	+8.287	8	4
9	5	(Hungary) Norbert Michelisz	Zengő Motorsport	BMW 320 TC	Y	12	+8.431	10	2
10	16	(Italy) Alberto Cerqui	ROAL Motorsport	BMW 320 TC	Y	12	+9.257	16	1
11	26	(Italy) Stefano D'Aste	Wiechers-Sport	BMW 320 TC	Y	12	+9.465	11	
12	6	(Germany) Franz Engstler	Liqui Moly Team Engstler	BMW 320 TC	Y	12	+12.082	12	
13	23	(United Kingdom) Tom Chilton	Team Aon	Ford Focus S2000 TC		12	+12.668	14	
14	12	(Italy) Pasquale Di Sabatino	bamboo-engineering	Chevrolet Cruze 1.6T	Y	12	+15.886	17	
15	7	(Hong Kong) Charles Ng	Liqui Moly Team Engstler	BMW 320 TC	Y	12	+48.135	18	
16	14	(United Kingdom) James Nash	Team Aon	Ford Focus S2000 TC		12	+56.503	13	
17	27	(Hungary) Gábor Wéber	Zengő Motorsport	BMW 320 TC	Y	11	Damage	22	
18	4	(Russia) Aleksei Dudukalo	Lukoil Racing	SEAT León WTCC	Y	10	Mechanical	9	
Ret	24	(Spain) Isaac Tutumlu	Proteam Racing	BMW 320 TC	Y	2	Engine	21	
Ret	40	(Belgium) Andrea Barlesi	SUNRED Engineering	SEAT León TDI	Y	1	Collision	20	
Ret	25	(Morocco) Mehdi Bennani	Proteam Racing	BMW 320 TC	Y	1	Collision	19	
Ret	18	(Portugal) Tiago Monteiro	Tuenti Racing	SEAT León TDi		0	Collision	15	
DNS	20	(Hong Kong) Darryl O'Young	Special Tuning Racing	SEAT León WTCC	Y		Fire at warm-up		

- **Bold** denotes Fastest lap.

=== Race 2 ===
Pos.	No.	Name	Team	Car	C	Laps	Time/Retired	Grid	Points
1	1	(France) Yvan Muller	Chevrolet	Chevrolet Cruze 1.6T		10	20:07.643	9	25
2	8	(Switzerland) Alain Menu	Chevrolet	Chevrolet Cruze 1.6T		10	+0.307	7	18
3	2	(United Kingdom) **Robert Huff**	Chevrolet	Chevrolet Cruze 1.6T		10	+0.613	8	15
4	15	(Netherlands) Tom Coronel	ROAL Motorsport	BMW 320 TC		10	+0.993	5	12
5	26	(Italy) Stefano D'Aste	Wiechers-Sport	BMW 320 TC	Y	10	+6.125	11	10
6	6	(Germany) Franz Engstler	Liqui Moly Team Engstler	BMW 320 TC	Y	10	+6.705	12	8
7	11	(United Kingdom) Alex MacDowall	bamboo-engineering	Chevrolet Cruze 1.6T	Y	10	+7.247	3	6
8	5	(Hungary) Norbert Michelisz	Zengő Motorsport	BMW 320 TC	Y	10	+10.238	1	4
9	16	(Italy) Alberto Cerqui	ROAL Motorsport	BMW 320 TC	Y	10	+12.663	16	2
10	9	(Sweden) Rickard Rydell	Chevrolet Motorsport Sweden	Chevrolet Cruze 1.6T		10	+14.066	6	1
11	27	(Hungary) Gábor Wéber	Zengő Motorsport	BMW 320 TC	Y	10	+14.202	22	
12	74	(Spain) Pepe Oriola	Tuenti Racing	SEAT León WTCC	Y	10	+14.575	4	
13	14	(United Kingdom) James Nash	Team Aon	Ford Focus S2000 TC		10	+18.279	13	
14	25	(Morocco) Mehdi Bennani	Proteam Racing	BMW 320 TC	Y	10	+18.775	19	
15	40	(Belgium) Andrea Barlesi	SUNRED Engineering	SEAT León TDI	Y	10	+24.880	20	
16	23	(United Kingdom) Tom Chilton	Team Aon	Ford Focus S2000 TC		10	+25.586	14	
17	24	(Spain) Isaac Tutumlu	Proteam Racing	BMW 320 TC	Y	10	+35.129	21	
18	18	(Portugal) Tiago Monteiro	Tuenti Racing	SEAT León TDi		9	Mechanical	15	
19	12	(Italy) Pasquale Di Sabatino	bamboo-engineering	Chevrolet Cruze 1.6T	Y	8	Mechanical	17	
Ret	3	(Italy) Gabriele Tarquini	Lukoil Racing	SEAT León WTCC		1	Accident	10	
Ret	7	(Hong Kong) Charles Ng	Liqui Moly Team Engstler	BMW 320 TC	Y	1	Mechanical	18	
DNS	4	(Russia) Aleksei Dudukalo	Lukoil Racing	SEAT León WTCC	Y	0	Electrical	2	
DNS	20	(Hong Kong) Darryl O'Young	Special Tuning Racing	SEAT León WTCC	Y		Fire at warm-up		

- **Bold** denotes Fastest lap.
- Pepe Oriola started from the pitlane.

== Standings after the round ==
Drivers' Championship standings

Pos	Driver	Points
1	(France) Yvan Muller	54
2	(United Kingdom) Robert Huff	36
3	(Switzerland) Alain Menu	26
4	(Netherlands) Tom Coronel	22
5	(Italy) Gabriele Tarquini	20

Yokohama Independents' Trophy standings

Pos	Driver	Points
1	(Italy) Stefano D'Aste	14
2	(Spain) Pepe Oriola	14
3	(United Kingdom) Alex MacDowall	14
4	(Germany) Franz Engstler	12
5	(Hungary) Norbert Michelisz	11

Manufacturers' Championship standings

Pos	Manufacturer	Points
1	(United States) Chevrolet	93
2	(Spain) SEAT Racing Technology	49
3	(Germany) BMW Customer Racing Teams	49

- Note: Only the top five positions are included for both sets of drivers' standings.
