= James Nash (racing driver) =

British racing driver (born 1985)

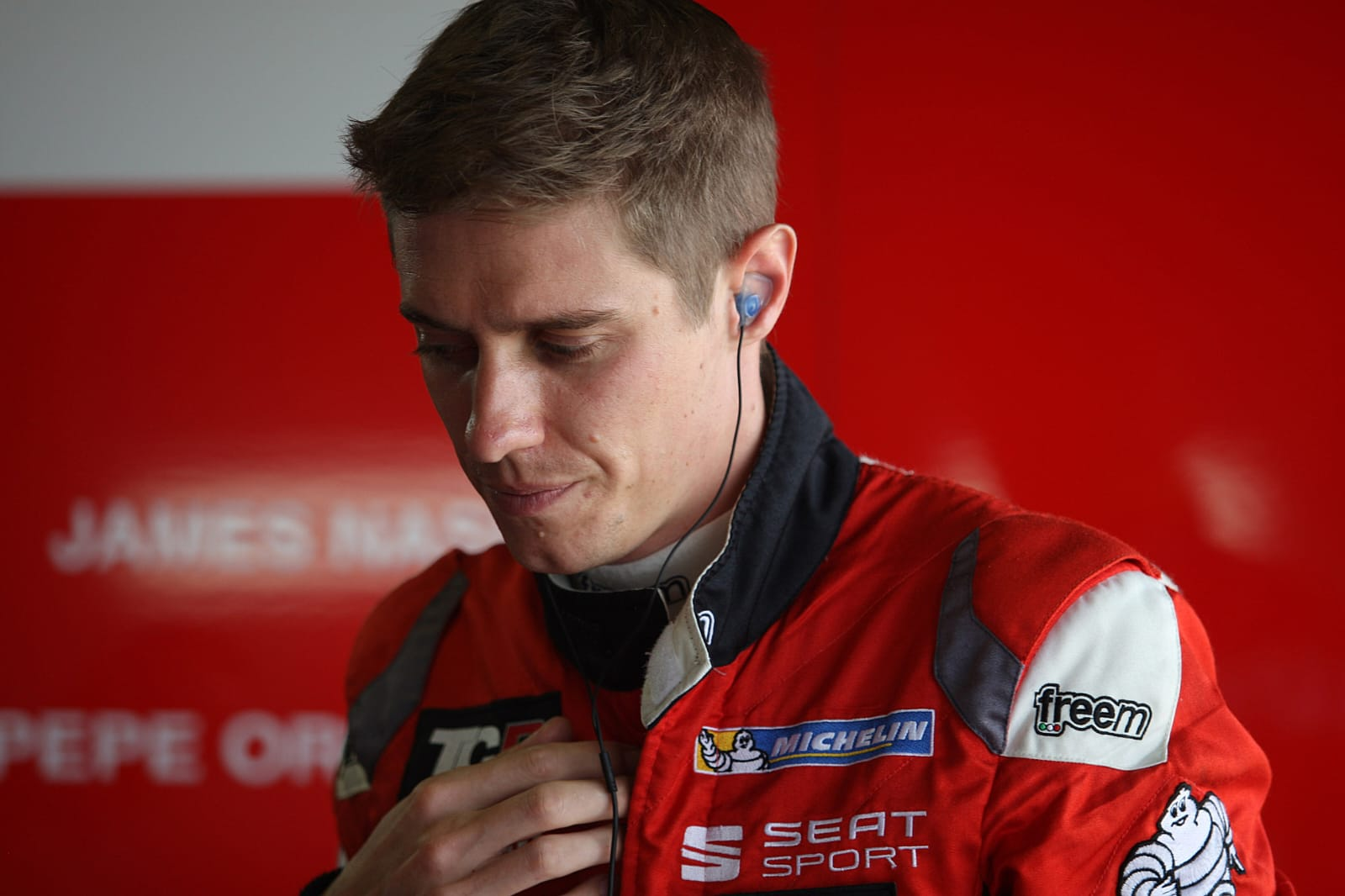
- Nash in 2017
- Nationality: (United Kingdom) British
- Born: James Elliott Martyn Nash; 16 December 1985 (age 40) Milton Keynes, Buckinghamshire, England, UK

Blancpain Endurance Series career
- Debut season: 2014
- Current team: Belgian Audi Club Team WRT
- Categorisation: FIA Gold
- Car number: 2
- Starts: 0
- Wins: 0
- Poles: 0
- Fastest laps: 0

Previous series
- 2012–2013 2009–2011 2011 2008 2006–2007: World Touring Car Championship; British Touring Car Championship; British GT Championship; SEAT León Eurocup; British Formula Ford

Championship titles
- 2013 2011: WTCC Independents' Trophy; BTCC Independents' Trophy

Awards
- 2006: BRDC Rising Star

James Elliott Martyn Nash (born 16 December 1985, in Milton Keynes, Buckinghamshire) is a British auto racing driver. On 16 October 2011, at the final round of the 2011 BTCC season, he clinched the independents' championship. In 2014, he is competing in the Blancpain Endurance Series for the Belgian Audi Club Team WRT.

== Racing career ==
=== Early years ===
Nash raced in karting until 2005 when he started racing in Formula Ford cars. He took one win, two poles, two fastest laps, one second and one third out of the six races in his first season. He was nominated for the McLaren Autosport BRDC Award in 2006. In 2007, he finished runner-up in the British Formula Ford Championship, his second year in the national series. Nash tested with British Formula 3 team Fluid Motorsport and then tested a Spanish Formula 3 Championship car at Silverstone with Team West-Tec.

Nash decided to turn his back on single seater racing and moved into touring cars, racing in the SEAT León Eurocup in 2008, a support series for the World Touring Car Championship with WTCC team SUNRED Engineering. He finished joint fourth in the championship, tied on 36 points with Massimiliano Pedalà.

=== British Touring Car Championship ===
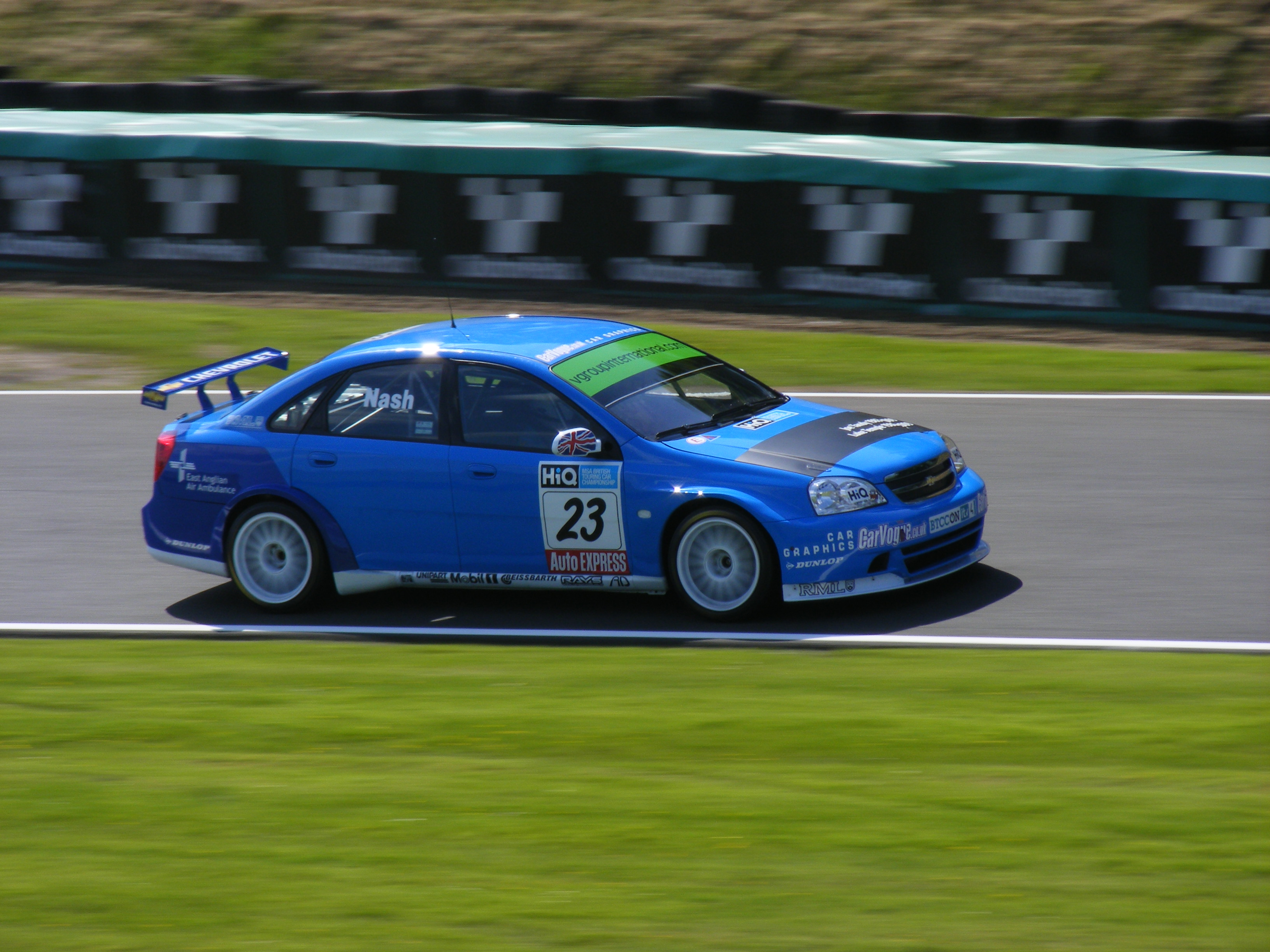
Nash competing in the 2009 British Touring Car Championship.

==== RML (2009) ====
Nash made the step up to the British Touring Car Championship in 2009 after being linked with Tempus Sport he completed a deal to race a third Chevrolet Lacetti for RML, making his debut in the fourth meeting of the season at Oulton Park.

Nash was running in second place in his ninth BTCC race at Snetterton when he made contact with Airwaves BMW driver Rob Collard, who went spinning off the track before rejoining in a heavy collision with the BMW of Stephen Jelley. Nash went on to win the race but was excluded for his part in the incident.

==== Triple 8 Race Engineering (2010–2011) ====
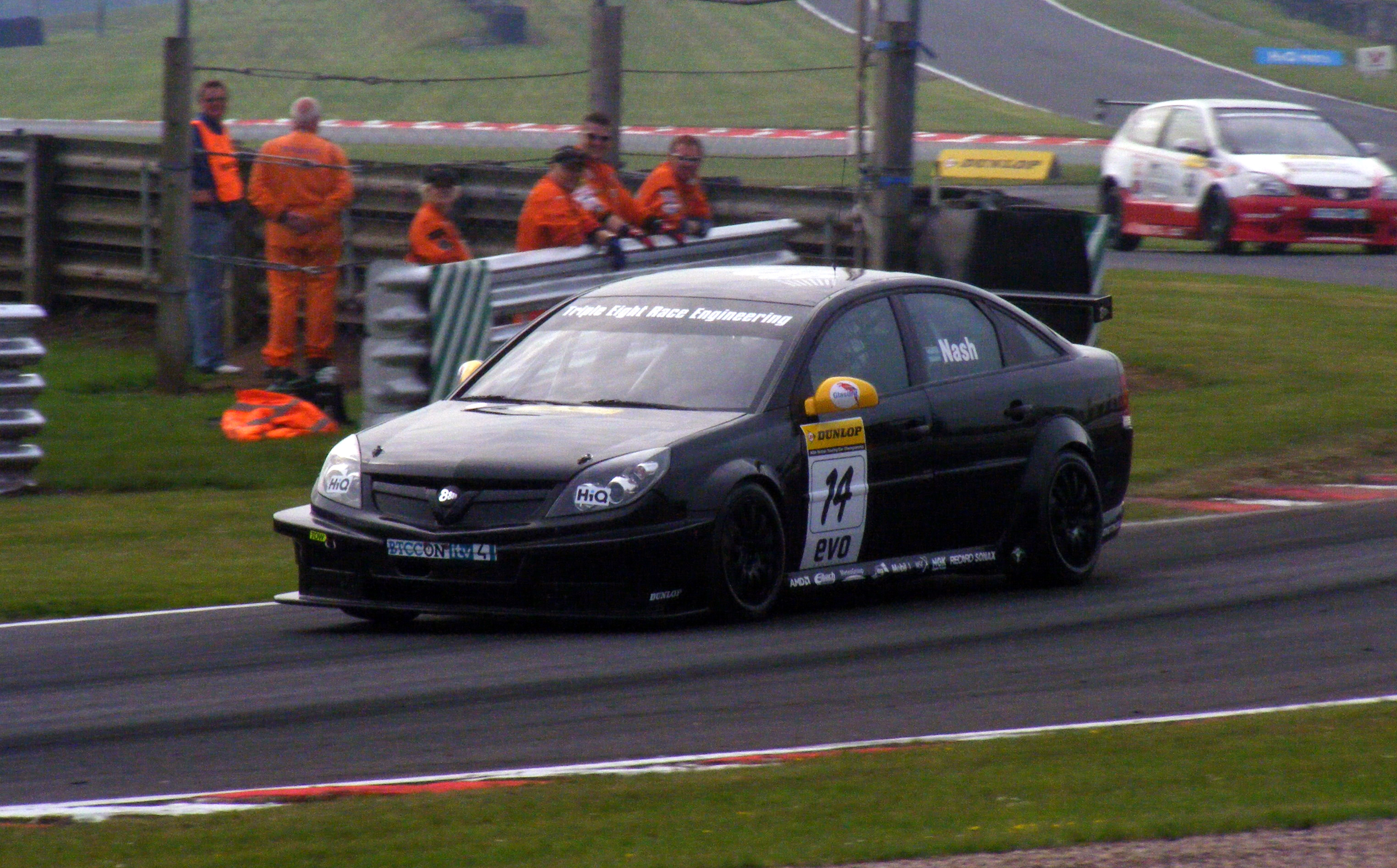
Nash competing in the 2010 British Touring Car Championship.

Nash was without a team for the first meeting of the 2010 season, but was signed by Triple 8 Race Engineering to replace Fabrizio Giovanardi from round two onwards. At Snetterton, he finished tenth in the second race, before the reverse-grid system handed him pole for the final race of the day, but he spun out of the lead on lap two and Gordon Shedden went on to take the win.

Nash returned to Triple 8 for a full campaign in 2011, with new teammate Tony Gilham in a second Vauxhall Vectra. He took his first career win in the reversed grid race at Rockingham, he started from fifth but led front row starters Rob Austin and Rob Collard home to the finish line.

Nash went to the final round at Silverstone in mathematical contention to win both the overall drivers' championship and the independent drivers' championship, a podium finish and two non-scores could not get him the overall championship but the independent victory in race one secured him the independents' trophy with a 32-point advantage over rival Mat Jackson. He also helped Triple 8 to secure the Independent Teams' Trophy.

=== World Touring Car Championship ===
==== Team Aon (2012) ====
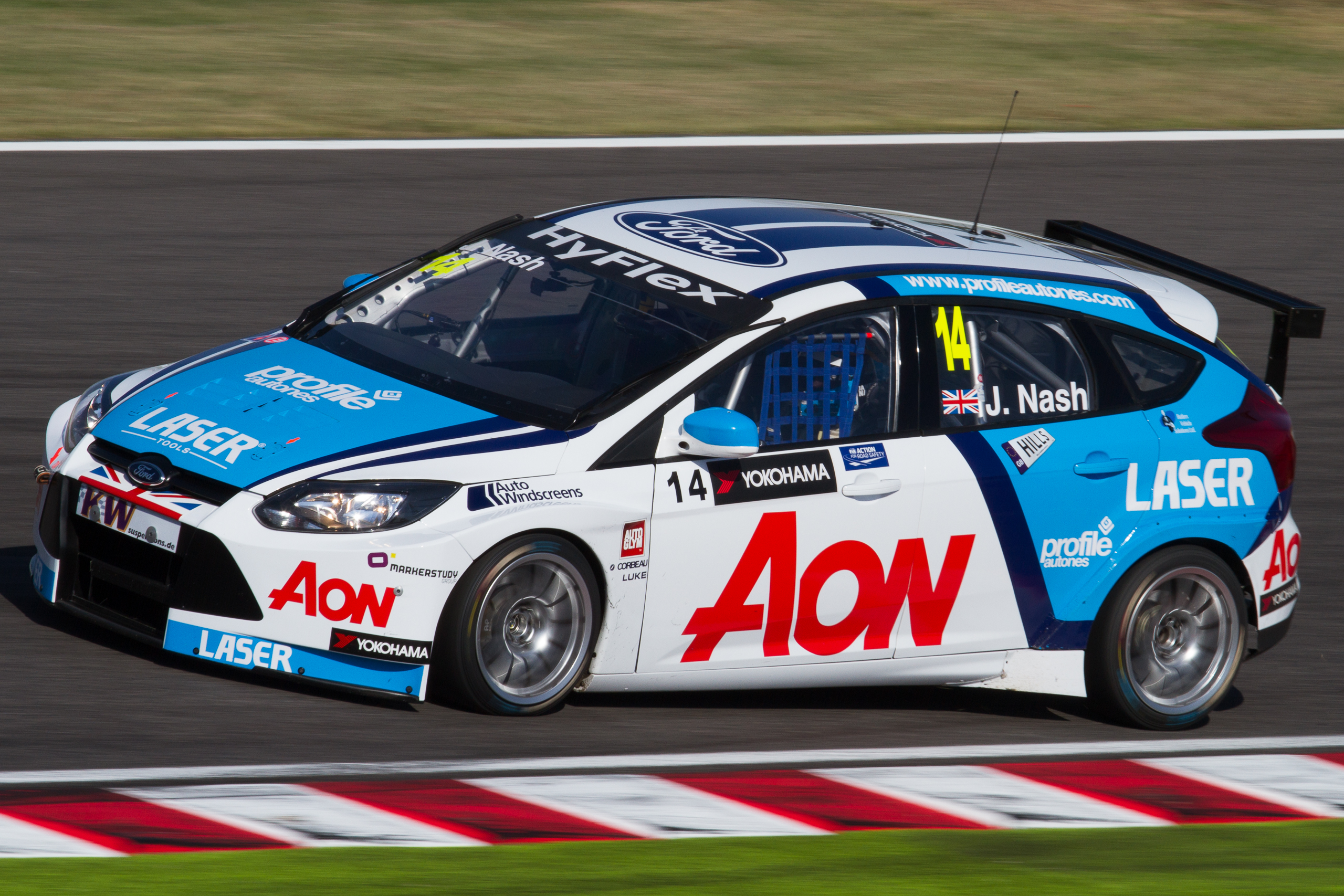
Nash driving for Team Aon at the 2012 FIA WTCC Race of Japan.

After claiming the BTCC Independents Drivers Championship in 2011, it was announced in February 2012 that Nash would move to the World Touring Car Championship to partner Tom Chilton at Team Aon.

Nash started on pole position for the reversed grid second race at Marrakech and held off Franz Engstler in the early laps before eventually being overcome by Yvan Muller. He finished the race in sixth place, scoring his first WTCC points. He qualified fourth for the next round at the Slovakiaring but was given a ten-place grid drop for failing the ride height check.

Near the end of the Race of Hungary race two, he pulled off the track two laps from the end with a car problem but was classified 19th and last. He scored a point once again in race one at the Race of Austria and then repeated the feat in race two, coming through the field when many other cars were suffering punctures as a result of aggressive cambers. Nash retired from both races in Portugal due to a collision in the first race and a set up error in race two. An engine change for both Fords at the Race of Japan sent Nash to the back of the grid for the first race. Engine problems in China meant he failed to finish either race, with his retirement in the second race being at the end of the warm up lap. Nash finished the championship in 20th place, two places above his teammate despite having not scored points since Austria.

==== Bamboo Engineering (2013) ====
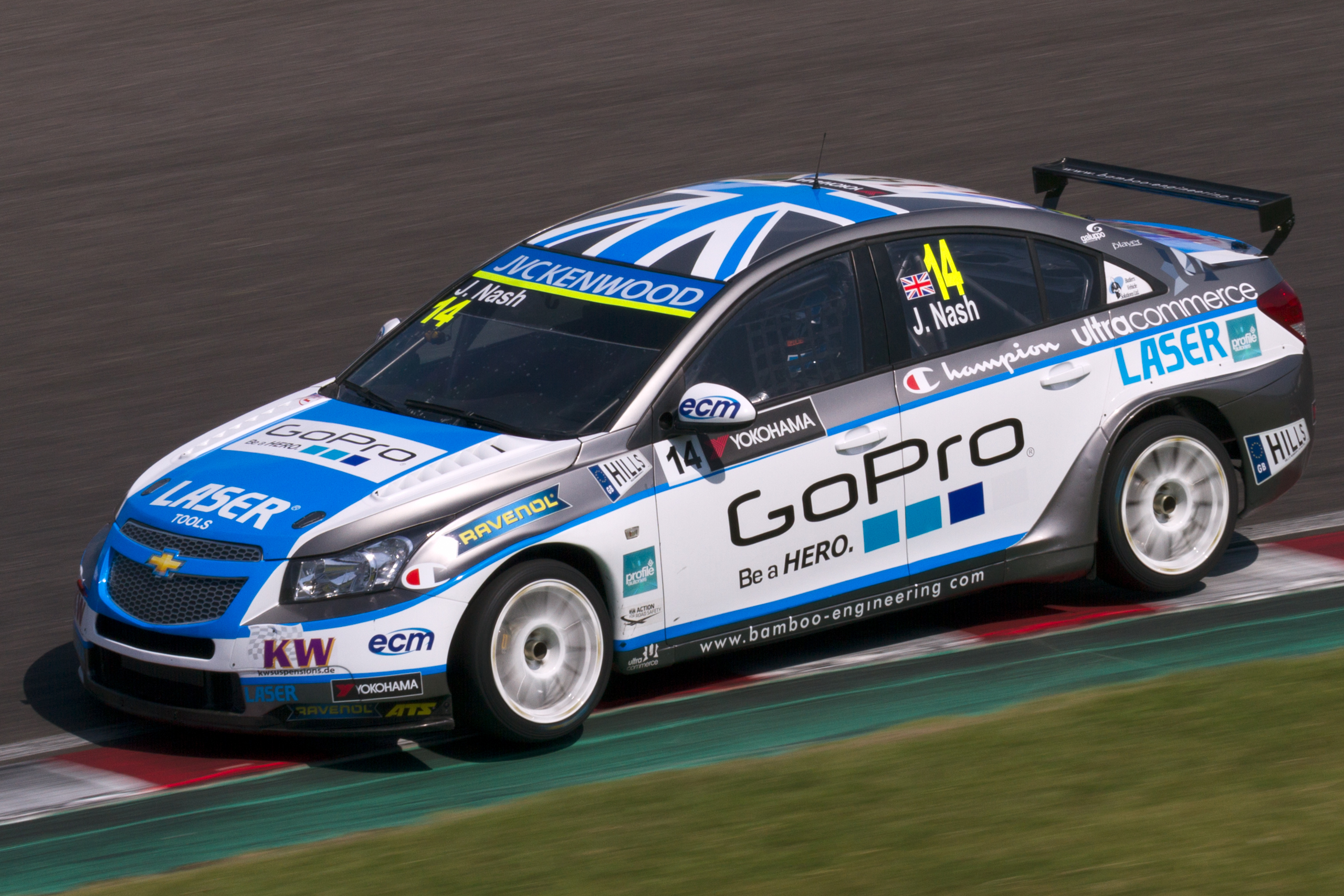
Nash competing in the 2013 World Touring Car Championship.

In December 2012, Bamboo Engineering announced that Nash would drive for them in 2013, competing in a latest specification Chevrolet Cruze 1.6T. He qualified fifth for the first race of the season and finished seventh in both races. He was second in the independents' class in both races which put him at the top of the Yokohama Independents' Trophy going to Morocco. He finished on the overall podium in the WTCC for the first time at the Race of Morocco, coming home third in race one. He then finished fourth in race two having started ninth. He finished outside the points for the first time in 2013 in race two of the Race of Slovakia having run off the road and through the gravel traps on the first lap. He recovered to finish seventeenth. At the Race of Austria after qualifying, Nash was investigated along with thirteen other drivers but no further action was taken. Twelve drivers were issued with grid penalties for the first race, moving Nash up from tenth on second on the race one grid while he would start from pole position for race two. Having finished second in the first race, he claimed his first overall WTCC victory in race two.

=== Blancpain Endurance Series ===
==== Belgian Audi Club Team WRT (2014–) ====
In 2014, Nash will compete in the Blancpain Endurance Series for the Belgian Audi Club Team WRT, in car number 2, alongside teammates Christopher Mies and Frank Stippler.

=== Other activities ===
Nash raced in the Dubai 24 Hour race in 2011, starting on pole position and setting fastest lap. That year, he also co-drove a Lotus Evora in the British GT Championship for a single race at Donington Park alongside Phil Glew. They finished as winners in the GT4 class.

== Media career ==
In 2011, Nash furthered his amateur media career by working with various amateur production companies in a Stunt Driving and Driver Consultancy role appearing in Charlie Simpson's hit single 'Cemetery' and working alongside Dot Rotten in his 2011 release 'Keep it on a low'.

== Racing record ==
=== Complete British Touring Car Championship results ===
(key) (Races in bold indicate pole position – 1 point awarded in first race) (Races in italics indicate fastest lap – 1 point awarded all races) (* signifies that driver lead race for at least one lap – 1 point given all races)

Year	Team	Car	1	2	3	4	5	6	7	8	9	10	11	12	13	14	15	16	17	18	19	20	21	22	23	24	25	26	27	28	29	30	Pos	Pts
2009	RML	Chevrolet Lacetti	BRH; 1	BRH; 2	BRH; 3	THR; 1	THR; 2	THR; 3	DON; 1	DON; 2	DON; 3	OUL; 1; 11	OUL; 2 Ret	OUL; 3; 17	CRO; 1; 13	CRO; 2; 15	CRO; 3 Ret	SNE; 1 NC	SNE; 2; 8	SNE; 3 DSQ	KNO; 1	KNO; 2	KNO; 3	SIL; 1; 3	SIL; 2 Ret	SIL; 3; 8	ROC; 1; 8	ROC; 2; 7	ROC; 3 Ret	BRH; 1	BRH; 2	BRH; 3	15th	24
2010	Uniq Racing with Triple Eight	Vauxhall Vectra	THR; 1	THR; 2	THR; 3	ROC; 1 Ret	ROC; 2; 10	ROC; 3; 8	BRH; 1 Ret	BRH; 2; 10	BRH; 3; 7	OUL; 1; 9	OUL; 2; 7	OUL; 3; 3	CRO; 1; 6	CRO; 2; 13	CRO; 3; 11	SNE; 1; 5	SNE; 2; 10	**SNE**; **3** Ret*	SIL; 1; 11	SIL; 2; 11	SIL; 3; 8	KNO; 1 Ret	KNO; 2; 11	KNO; 3; 11	DON; 1; 17	DON; 2; 10	DON; 3; 10	BRH; 1; 8	BRH; 2; 9	BRH; 3; 7	12th	52
2011	888 Racing with Collins Contractors	Vauxhall Vectra	BRH; 1; 2	BRH; 2; 4	BRH; 3; 6	DON; 1; 3*	DON; 2; 2	DON; 3; 3	THR; 1; 8	THR; 2; 6	THR; 3; 4	OUL; 1; 4	OUL; 2; 2	OUL; 3; 13	CRO; 1; 8	CRO; 2; 11	CRO; 3; 5	SNE; 1; 5	SNE; 2; 2	SNE; 3; 6	KNO; 1; 6	KNO; 2; 8	KNO; 3; 15	ROC; 1; 9	ROC; 2; 6	ROC; 3; 1*	BRH; 1; 4	BRH; 2; 6	BRH; 3; 3	SIL; 1; 3	SIL; 2; 15	SIL; 3; 17	5th	191
2018	BTC Norlin Racing	Honda Civic Type R	BRH; 1; 17	BRH; 2; 14	BRH; 3 Ret	DON; 1; 18	DON; 2 Ret	DON; 3; 12	THR; 1; 23	THR; 2; 21	THR; 3; 23	OUL; 1	OUL; 2	OUL; 3	CRO; 1	CRO; 2	CRO; 3	SNE; 1	SNE; 2	SNE; 3	ROC; 1	ROC; 2	ROC; 3	KNO; 1	KNO; 2	KNO; 3	SIL; 1	SIL; 2	SIL; 3	BRH; 1	BRH; 2	BRH; 3	31st	6

=== Complete British GT Championship results ===
(key) (Races in bold indicate pole position in class) (Races in italics indicate fastest lap in class)

Year	Team	Car	Class	1	2	3	4	5	6	7	8	9	10	Pos	Pts
2011	Lotus Sport UK	Lotus Evora	GT4	OUL; 1	OUL; 2	SNE; 1	BRH; 1	SPA; 1	SPA; 2	ROC; 1	ROC; 2	DON; 1; 13	SIL; 1	10th	37.5
2015	UltraTek Racing	Lotus Evora GT4	GT4	OUL; 1	OUL; 2	ROC; 1; 23	SIL; 1; 21	SPA; 1; 29	BRH; 1; 19	SNE; 1 Ret	SNE; 2; 26	DON; 1; 16		19th	27

=== Complete World Touring Car Championship results ===
(key) (Races in bold indicate pole position) (Races in italics indicate fastest lap)

Year	Team	Car	1	2	3	4	5	6	7	8	9	10	11	12	13	14	15	16	17	18	19	20	21	22	23	24	Pos	Pts
2012	Team Aon	Ford Focus 1.6T	ITA; 1; 16	ITA; 2; 13	ESP; 1; 12	ESP; 2 Ret	MAR; 1 Ret	**MAR**; **2**; 6	SVK; 1 Ret	SVK; 2 DNS	HUN; 1; 11	HUN; 2; 19†	AUT; 1; 10	AUT; 2; 10	POR; 1 Ret	POR; 2 Ret	BRA; 1; 15	BRA; 2; 15	USA; 1; 17†	USA; 2; 17	JPN; 1; 19	JPN; 2; 16	CHN; 1 Ret	CHN; 2 Ret	MAC; 1; 12	MAC; 2; 12	20th	12
2013	bamboo-engineering	Chevrolet Cruze 1.6T	ITA; 1; 7	ITA; 2; 7	MAR; 1; 3	MAR; 2; 4	SVK; 1; 6	SVK; 2; 17	HUN; 1; 9	HUN; 2; 4	AUT; 1; 2	**AUT**; **2**; 1	RUS; 1; 8	RUS; 2; 10	POR; 1; 11	**POR**; **2**; 1	ARG; 1; 9	ARG; 2; 7	USA; 1; 5	USA; 2; 8	JPN; 1; 5	JPN; 2; 5	CHN; 1; 3	CHN; 2; 6	MAC; 1; 6	MAC; 2; 4	**3rd**	**226**

† Did not finish the race, but was classified as he completed over 90% of the race distance.

=== Complete Blancpain Sprint Series results ===
Year	Team	Car	Class	1	2	3	4	5	6	7	8	9	10	11	12	13	14	Pos.	Points
2015	Belgian Audi Club Team WRT	Audi R8 LMS ultra	Pro	NOG; QR; 11	NOG; CR; 6	BRH; QR; 8	BRH; CR; 9	ZOL; QR; Ret	ZOL; CR; DNS	MOS; QR; 11	MOS; CR; 8	ALG; QR; 6	ALG; CR; 12	MIS; QR; 8	MIS; CR; 13	ZAN; QR; Ret	ZAN; CR; Ret	21st	17

=== Complete TCR International Series results ===
(key) (Races in bold indicate pole position) (Races in italics indicate fastest lap)

Year	Team	Car	1	2	3	4	5	6	7	8	9	10	11	12	13	14	15	16	17	18	19	20	21	22	DC	Points
2015	Proteam Racing	Ford Focus ST	SEP; 1	SEP; 2	SHA; 1	SHA; 2	VAL; 1	VAL; 2	ALG; 1	ALG; 2	MNZ; 1	MNZ; 2	SAL; 1	SAL; 2	SOC; 1	SOC; 2	RBR; 1	RBR; 2	MRN; 1	MRN; 2	CHA; 1	CHA; 2	MAC; 1 Ret	MAC; 2 DNS	NC	0
2016	Team Craft-Bamboo Lukoil	SEAT León TCR	BHR; 1; 3	BHR; 2; 2	EST; 1; 6	EST; 2; 1	SPA; 1; 8	SPA; 2; 6	IMO; 1 Ret	IMO; 2 DNS	SAL; 1; 2	SAL; 2; 4	OSC; 1; 3	OSC; 2; 3	SOC; 1; 8	SOC; 2; 4	CHA; 1; 2	CHA; 2; 1	MRN; 1; 5	MRN; 2; 3	SEP; 1; 3	SEP; 2; 2	MAC; 1; 18†	MAC; 2; 8	2nd	264
2017	Lukoil Craft-Bamboo Racing	SEAT León TCR	RIM; 1; 13	RIM; 2; 5	BHR; 1; 7	BHR; 2; 2	SPA; 1; 11	SPA; 2; 8	MNZ; 1; 12	MNZ; 2; 4	SAL; 1; 6	SAL; 2; 6	HUN; 1; 7	HUN; 2; 9	OSC; 1; 4	OSC; 2 Ret	CHA; 1 Ret	CHA; 2; 7	ZHE; 1; 9	ZHE; 2; 3	DUB; 1; 4	DUB; 2; 11			7th	129

^{†} Driver did not finish the race, but was classified as he completed over 75% of the race distance.

Sporting positions
Preceded by Norbert Michelisz	World Touring Car Championship; Independents' Trophy winner 2013	Succeeded by Franz Engstler
