= 2012 FIA WTCC Race of Spain =

2012 Race of Spain
Race details
- Round 2 of 12 in the 2012 World Touring Car Championship at Circuit Ricardo Tormo in Valencia, Spain.
- Date: 1 April, 2012
- Location: Valencia, Spain
- Course: Circuit Ricardo Tormo; 4.005 kilometres (2.489 mi)

Race One
- Laps: 13
Pole position
Driver		(France) Yvan Muller	Chevrolet
Time		1:42.228	
Podium
First		(France) Yvan Muller	Chevrolet
Second		(Italy) Gabriele Tarquini	Lukoil Racing
Third		(Netherlands) Tom Coronel	ROAL Motorsport
Fastest Lap
Driver		(France) Yvan Muller	Chevrolet
Time		1:44.194	

Race Two
- Laps: 13
Podium
First		(Switzerland) Alain Menu	Chevrolet
Second		(Netherlands) Tom Coronel	ROAL Motorsport
Third		(Italy) Stefano D'Aste	Wiechers-Sport
Fastest Lap
Driver		(Switzerland) Alain Menu	Chevrolet
Time		1:44.278	

The 2012 FIA WTCC Race of Spain was the second round of the 2012 World Touring Car Championship season and the eighth running of the FIA WTCC Race of Spain . It was held on 1 April 2012 at the Circuit Ricardo Tormo in Valencia, Spain. Chevrolet driver Yvan Muller took pole position for the first race, with Wiechers-Sport's Stefano D'Aste on pole for the second race after the top ten qualifiers were reversed. Both races were won by Chevrolet with Muller winning race one and Alain Menu winning race two.

== Background ==
After the opening round in Italy, Muller was leading the drivers' championship. D'Aste was leading the Yokohama Independents' Trophy.

A continued shortage of the new for 2012 SEAT 1.6T engine meant the cars run by SUNRED Engineering switched to the SUNRED 1.6T engine prior to the Race of Spain. Tiago Monteiro and Andrea Barlesi would switch to the engine and they were joined by series debutant Fernando Monje. Monje joined the championship, having competed in the supporting European Touring Car Cup at Monza. Tom Boardman returned to the championship having been forced to sit out the opening round. With no SEAT 1.6T engine available for him, he took part in the event using the TDI engine.

== Report ==
=== Free practice ===
Muller led the opening practice session on Saturday morning with Robert Huff second and Menu third. Pepe Oriola was the fastest SEAT León WTCC while Monteiro was the fastest of the three SUNRED engined cars.

Gabriele Tarquini went quickest in the second free practice session in his Lukoil Racing Team SEAT. ROAL Motorsport driver Tom Coronel had set the pace for much of the session until his time was beaten by Huff and then Tarquini in the final five minutes of the session. Charles Ng was given a black flag after getting stuck in a gravel trap on his first flying lap and then continuing in the session after receiving outside help. Six drivers were warned for cutting the apex at the first corner.

=== Qualifying ===
Muller secured his first pole position of the year in qualifying ahead of Tarquini and Coronel. Oriola took the independents' pole with fourth place. Tarquini had been fastest in the first part of qualifying but Muller had been close to going out in the first element of qualifying. Muller had his best time removed for running too wide but he ended the session eighth after a last minute flying lap. By finishing tenth in second qualifying, D'Aste secured the pole position on the reversed grid in race two. The session was not stopped at any time but after the session, the Lukoil Racing car of Aleksei Dudukalo caught fire in Parc Ferme.

=== Warm-Up ===
Huff led the warm up session on Sunday morning with pole sitter Muller second fastest.

=== Race One ===
Muller led from start to finish to secure his third straight victory of the year. Tarquini had got a better launch from the rolling start but Muller was able to defend and from then on Tarquini's main threat was from Coronel behind. Coronel had received a black and white driving standards flag for making contact with Tarquini but continued on to the final podium spot. Huff and Menu climbed up to fourth and fifth respectively at the expense of Oriola, but sixth place was still enough to secure the independents' victory for Oriola. Monteiro was able to finish in the top ten in his SUNRED-powered car while the only car that failed to finish was Dudukalo.

=== Race Two ===
Menu ended Muller's winning streak in race two by coming home ahead of Coronel and D'Aste. Wiechers-Sport driver D'Aste had led until lap seven when he ran wide and handed the lead to Menu. Both Menu and D'Aste then hit oil two laps later sending them across the gravel at turn ten and promoting Coronel to second. Coronel battled with Menu for the lead in the final laps but held on to take the win by less than a second. Menu's Chevrolet was followed home by four BMW 320 TCs as Norbert Michelisz and Franz Engstler followed Coronel and D'Aste.

== Results ==
=== Qualifying ===
Pos.	No.	Name	Team	Car	C	Q1	Q2	Points
1	1	(France) Yvan Muller	Chevrolet	Chevrolet Cruze 1.6T		1:43.458	1:42.228	**5**
2	3	(Italy) Gabriele Tarquini	Lukoil Racing	SEAT León WTCC		1:42.933	1:42.591	**4**
3	15	(Netherlands) Tom Coronel	ROAL Motorsport	BMW 320 TC		1:43.323	1:42.643	**3**
4	74	(Spain) Pepe Oriola	Tuenti Racing	SEAT León WTCC	Y	1:43.340	1:42.829	**2**
5	2	(United Kingdom) Robert Huff	Chevrolet	Chevrolet Cruze 1.6T		1:43.427	1:42.862	**1**
6	5	(Hungary) Norbert Michelisz	Zengő Motorsport	BMW 320 TC	Y	1:43.483	1:42.994	
7	6	(Germany) Franz Engstler	Liqui Moly Team Engstler	BMW 320 TC	Y	1:43.683	1:43.108	
8	4	(Russia) Aleksei Dudukalo	Lukoil Racing	SEAT León WTCC	Y	1:43.230	1:43.410	
9	8	(Switzerland) Alain Menu	Chevrolet	Chevrolet Cruze 1.6T		1:42.975	1:43.472	
10	26	(Italy) **Stefano D'Aste**	Wiechers-Sport	BMW 320 TC	Y	1:43.850	1:43.544	
11	18	(Portugal) Tiago Monteiro	Tuenti Racing	SR León 1.6T		1:43.801	1:43.640	
12	20	(China) Darryl O'Young	Special Tuning Racing	SEAT León WTCC	Y	1:43.391	1:43.832	
13	16	(Italy) Alberto Cerqui	ROAL Motorsport	BMW 320 TC	Y	1:43.889		
14	11	(United Kingdom) Alex MacDowall	bamboo-engineering	Chevrolet Cruze 1.6T	Y	1:43.951		
15	25	(Morocco) Mehdi Bennani	Proteam Racing	BMW 320 TC	Y	1:44.060		
16	14	(United Kingdom) James Nash	Team Aon	Ford Focus S2000 TC		1:44.126		
17	27	(Hungary) Gábor Wéber	Zengő Motorsport	BMW 320 TC	Y	1:44.316		
18	12	(Italy) Pasquale Di Sabatino	bamboo-engineering	Chevrolet Cruze 1.6T	Y	1:44.342		
19	24	(Spain) Isaac Tutumlu	Proteam Racing	BMW 320 TC	Y	1:44.435		
20	88	(Spain) Fernando Monje	SUNRED Engineering	SR León 1.6T	Y	1:44.509		
21	23	(United Kingdom) Tom Chilton	Team Aon	Ford Focus S2000 TC		1:44.702		
22	22	(United Kingdom) Tom Boardman	Special Tuning Racing	SEAT León TDi	Y	1:44.703		
23	40	(Belgium) Andrea Barlesi	SUNRED Engineering	SR León 1.6T	Y	1:45.124		
24	7	(Hong Kong) Charles Ng	Liqui Moly Team Engstler	BMW 320 TC	Y	1:45.716		

- **Bold** denotes Pole position for second race.

=== Race 1 ===
Pos.	No.	Name	Team	Car	C	Laps	Time/Retired	Grid	Points
1	1	(France) **Yvan Muller**	Chevrolet	Chevrolet Cruze 1.6T		13	22:53.924	1	25
2	3	(Italy) Gabriele Tarquini	Lukoil Racing	SEAT León WTCC		13	+6.988	2	18
3	15	(Netherlands) Tom Coronel	ROAL Motorsport	BMW 320 TC		13	+7.232	3	15
4	2	(United Kingdom) Robert Huff	Chevrolet	Chevrolet Cruze 1.6T		13	+8.982	5	12
5	8	(Switzerland) Alain Menu	Chevrolet	Chevrolet Cruze 1.6T		13	+9.250	9	10
6	74	(Spain) Pepe Oriola	Tuenti Racing	SEAT León WTCC	Y	13	+10.614	4	8
7	5	(Hungary) Norbert Michelisz	Zengő Motorsport	BMW 320 TC	Y	13	+11.854	6	6
8	6	(Germany) Franz Engstler	Liqui Moly Team Engstler	BMW 320 TC	Y	13	+12.202	7	4
9	18	(Portugal) Tiago Monteiro	Tuenti Racing	SR León 1.6T		13	+21.185	11	2
10	20	(China) Darryl O'Young	Special Tuning Racing	SEAT León WTCC	Y	13	+24.010	12	1
11	26	(Italy) Stefano D'Aste	Wiechers-Sport	BMW 320 TC	Y	13	+25.349	10	
12	14	(United Kingdom) James Nash	Team Aon	Ford Focus S2000 TC		13	+30.104	16	
13	16	(Italy) Alberto Cerqui	ROAL Motorsport	BMW 320 TC	Y	13	+30.282	13	
14	25	(Morocco) Mehdi Bennani	Proteam Racing	BMW 320 TC	Y	13	+30.685	15	
15	11	(United Kingdom) Alex MacDowall	bamboo-engineering	Chevrolet Cruze 1.6T	Y	13	+31.373	14	
16	24	(Spain) Isaac Tutumlu	Proteam Racing	BMW 320 TC	Y	13	+32.187	19	
17	27	(Hungary) Gábor Wéber	Zengő Motorsport	BMW 320 TC	Y	13	+33.507	17	
18	7	(Hong Kong) Charles Ng	Liqui Moly Team Engstler	BMW 320 TC	Y	13	+34.050	24	
19	23	(United Kingdom) Tom Chilton	Team Aon	Ford Focus S2000 TC		13	+34.372	21	
20	22	(United Kingdom) Tom Boardman	Special Tuning Racing	SEAT León TDi	Y	13	+36.599	22	
21	88	(Spain) Fernando Monje	SUNRED Engineering	SR León 1.6T	Y	13	+37.377	20	
22	12	(Italy) Pasquale Di Sabatino	bamboo-engineering	Chevrolet Cruze 1.6T	Y	13	+37.926	18	
23	40	(Belgium) Andrea Barlesi	SUNRED Engineering	SR León 1.6T	Y	13	+51.999	23	
NC	4	(Russia) Aleksei Dudukalo	Lukoil Racing	SEAT León WTCC	Y	6	+7 Laps	8	

- **Bold** denotes Fastest lap.

=== Race 2 ===
Pos.	No.	Name	Team	Car	C	Laps	Time/Retired	Grid	Points
1	8	(Switzerland) **Alain Menu**	Chevrolet	Chevrolet Cruze 1.6T		13	23:03.207	2	25
2	15	(Netherlands) Tom Coronel	ROAL Motorsport	BMW 320 TC		13	+0.861	8	18
3	26	(Italy) Stefano D'Aste	Wiechers-Sport	BMW 320 TC	Y	13	+1.306	1	15
4	5	(Hungary) Norbert Michelisz	Zengő Motorsport	BMW 320 TC	Y	13	+1.629	5	12
5	6	(Germany) Franz Engstler	Liqui Moly Team Engstler	BMW 320 TC	Y	13	+1.901	4	10
6	2	(United Kingdom) Robert Huff	Chevrolet	Chevrolet Cruze 1.6T		13	+3.007	6	8
7	74	(Spain) Pepe Oriola	Tuenti Racing	SEAT León WTCC	Y	13	+5.704	7	6
8	1	(France) Yvan Muller	Chevrolet	Chevrolet Cruze 1.6T		13	+6.368	10	4
9	3	(Italy) Gabriele Tarquini	Lukoil Racing	SEAT León WTCC		13	+15.044	9	2
10	25	(Morocco) Mehdi Bennani	Proteam Racing	BMW 320 TC	Y	13	+15.306	15	1
11	24	(Spain) Isaac Tutumlu	Proteam Racing	BMW 320 TC	Y	13	+19.838	19	
12	4	(Russia) Aleksei Dudukalo	Lukoil Racing	SEAT León WTCC	Y	13	+21.166	3	
13	18	(Portugal) Tiago Monteiro	Tuenti Racing	SR León 1.6T		13	+21.865	11	
14	11	(United Kingdom) Alex MacDowall	bamboo-engineering	Chevrolet Cruze 1.6T	Y	13	+23.167	14	
15	23	(United Kingdom) Tom Chilton	Team Aon	Ford Focus S2000 TC		13	+25.024	21	
16	12	(Italy) Pasquale Di Sabatino	bamboo-engineering	Chevrolet Cruze 1.6T	Y	13	+27.071	18	
17	40	(Belgium) Andrea Barlesi	SUNRED Engineering	SR León 1.6T	Y	13	+50.229	23	
18	88	(Spain) Fernando Monje	SUNRED Engineering	SR León 1.6T	Y	13	+1:04.377	20	
19	7	(Hong Kong) Charles Ng	Liqui Moly Team Engstler	BMW 320 TC	Y	10	+3 Laps	24	
Ret	14	(United Kingdom) James Nash	Team Aon	Ford Focus S2000 TC		8	Suspension	16	
Ret	20	(China) Darryl O'Young	Special Tuning Racing	SEAT León WTCC	Y	4	Overheating	12	
Ret	16	(Italy) Alberto Cerqui	ROAL Motorsport	BMW 320 TC	Y	1	Suspension	13	
Ret	22	(United Kingdom) Tom Boardman	Special Tuning Racing	SEAT León TDi	Y	0	Accident	22	
DNS	27	(Hungary) Gábor Wéber	Zengő Motorsport	BMW 320 TC	Y	0	Clutch	17	

- **Bold** denotes Fastest lap.

== Standings after the round ==
Drivers' Championship standings

	Pos	Driver	Points
	1	(France) Yvan Muller	88
1	2	(Switzerland) Alain Menu	61
1	3	(Netherlands) Tom Coronel	58
2	4	(United Kingdom) Robert Huff	57
	5	(Italy) Gabriele Tarquini	44

Yokohama Independents' Trophy standings

	Pos	Driver	Points
1	1	(Spain) Pepe Oriola	31
1	2	(Italy) Stefano D'Aste	28
2	3	(Hungary) Norbert Michelisz	27
	4	(Germany) Franz Engstler	25
2	5	(United Kingdom) Alex MacDowall	16

Manufacturers' Championship standings

	Pos	Manufacturer	Points
	1	(United States) Chevrolet	173
1	2	(Germany) BMW Customer Racing Teams	108
1	3	(Spain) SEAT Racing Technology	101

- Note: Only the top five positions are included for both sets of drivers' standings.
