= Andrea Barlesi =

Belgian-Italian racing driver

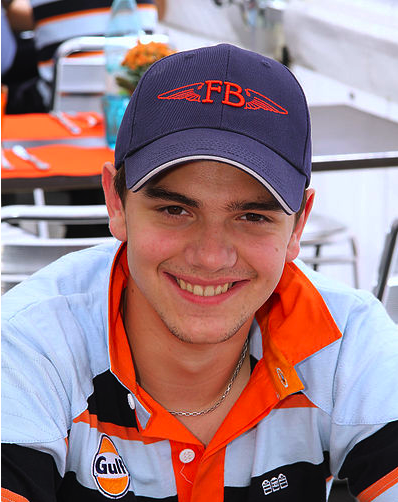
- Barlesi in 2011
- Nationality: (Belgium) Belgian
- Born: Andrea Guillaume Clement Barlesi; 15 June 1991 (age 35) Bruges, Belgium

World Touring Car Championship career
- Debut season: 2012
- Current team: SUNRED Engineering
- Categorisation: FIA Silver
- Car number: 40

Championship titles
- 2010: Le Mans Series - FLM

Andrea Guillaume Clement Barlesi (born 15 June 1991, in Bruges) is a Belgian-Italian racing driver who runs under a Belgian racing licence. A Formula Le Mans champion in ELMS, he has finished on the LMP2 podium at Sebring and raced in the World Touring Car Championship.

He is now an airline pilot.

== Early career ==
Barlesi has won the French Karting Championship a Europe Kart Championship twice (2007 and 2008). He won Belgium Karting Championship once (2007). In 2009, he was third on the Clio Junior Cup Championship with five podiums.

== Professional career ==
=== Formula Le Mans ===
In 2010, Barlesi joined the Le Mans Series' FLM field with DAMS, winning one race at the Hungaroring. He won the championship with teammate Gary Chalandon, by two points over Steve Zacchia.

=== Intercontinental Le Mans Cup ===
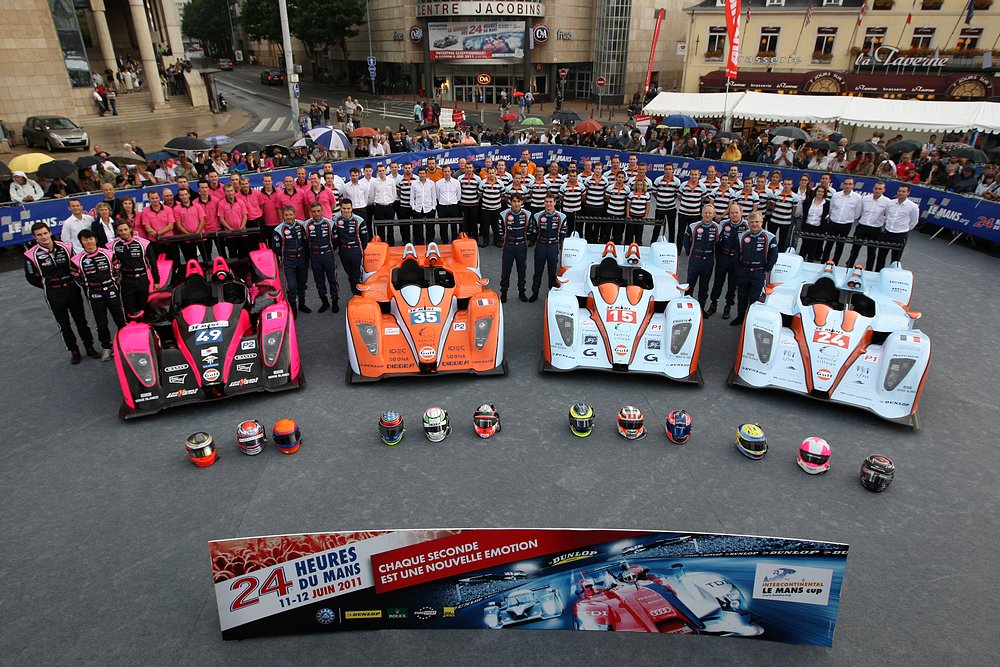
OAK Racing group photograph for the 2011 24 Hours of Le Mans.

In 2011, Barlesi entered 4 rounds of the Intercontinental Le Mans Cup with OAK Racing. Headlining the Pescarolo 01 crew together with bronze-rated drivers Patrice Lafargue and Frédéric Da Rocha, he secured a podium on his LMP2 debut at the 12 Hours of Sebring, and finished seventh in class at the 24 Hours of Le Mans.

=== Blancpain Endurance Series ===
In 2011, Barlesi did four rounds of the Blancpain Endurance Series with Gulf Racing running with a Lamborghini Gallardo GT3 for GT3 Pro-Am category. He scored six points on the season finale at Silverstone alongside Fabien Giroix and Frédéric Fatien.

In 2012, alongside his WTCC commitments, Barlesi joined GT racing powerhouse Vita4One Racing for a one-off Blancpain start, aboard a Ferrari 458 Italia GT3 at Circuit Paul Ricard.

=== WTCC ===
In 2012, Barlesi joined the World Touring Car Championship with SUNRED Engineering. Barlesi ran the No. 40 SEAT León as teammate to former Formula One driver Tiago Monteiro and Spanish pair Fernando Monje and Pepe Oriola. He scored a best finish of 13th at the Race of Morocco in Marrakech.

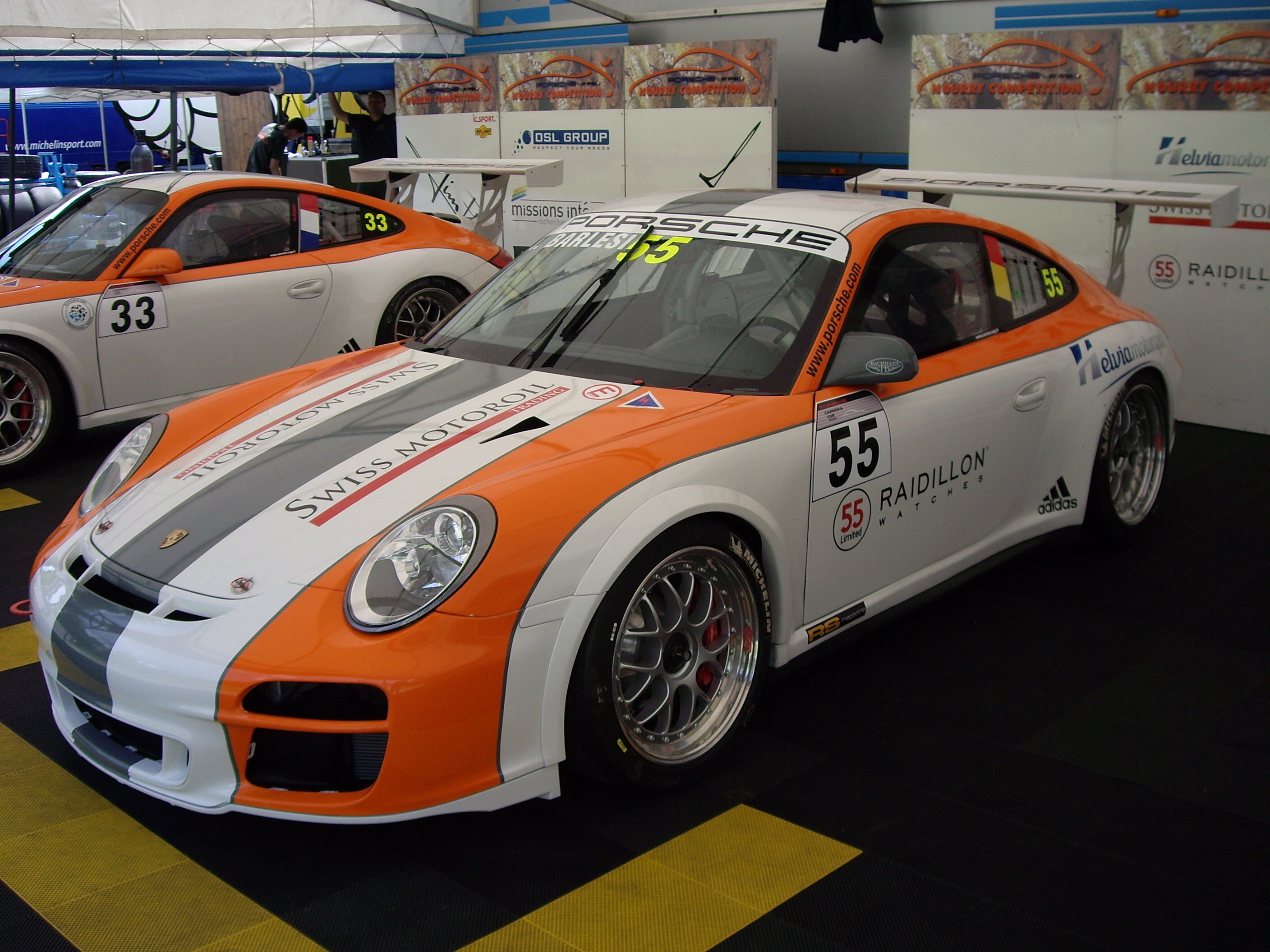
Porsche 997 GT3 Cup, raced by Barlesi at the Pau Grand Prix in 2013.

=== Hiatus and retirement ===
After a sabbatical year, Barlesi returned to motorsport at the 2014 VLN Series and 24 Hours of Nürburgring with Ferrari customer GT Corse by Rinaldi. His last known race appearance is the 2015 24 Hours of Nürburgring, where he drove a BMW M235i Racing for Pixum Team Adrenalin Motorsport.

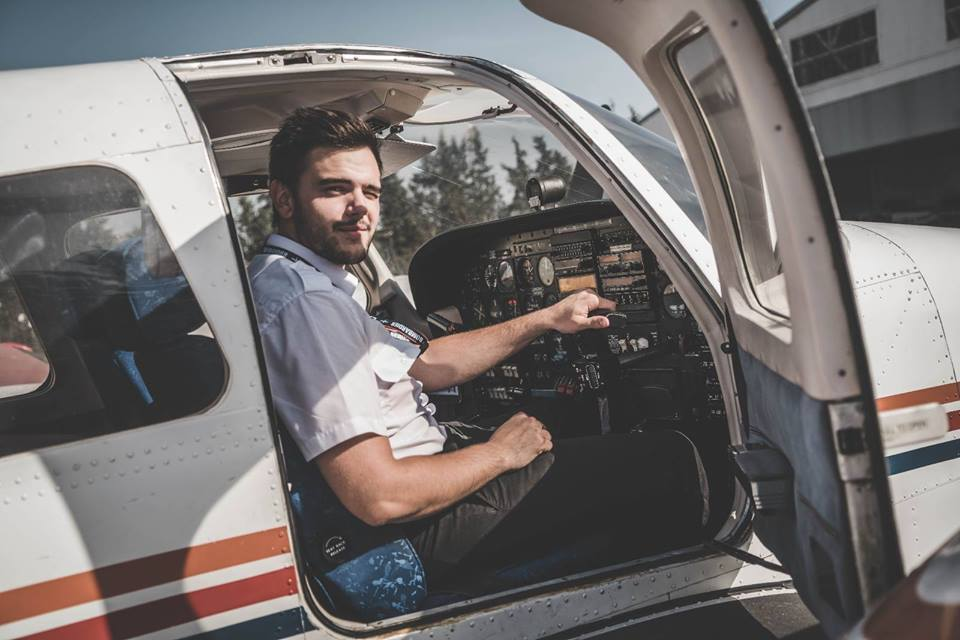
Barlesi at the controls of a Piper Aircraft during his flight training.

As of 2019, Barlesi worked as a professional Airbus A320 pilot for EasyJet. In 2023 he joined Air France.

== Racing record ==
=== Complete Le Mans Series results ===
(key) (Races in bold indicate pole position; results in italics indicate fastest lap)

Year	Entrant	Class	Chassis	Engine	1	2	3	4	5	Rank	Points
2010	DAMS	FLM	Oreca FLM09	Chevrolet LS3 6.2 L V8	LEC; 3	SPA; Ret	ALG; 2	HUN; 1	SIL; 4	1st	59

=== Complete Intercontinental Le Mans Cup results ===
(key) (Races in bold indicate pole position; races in italics indicate fastest lap)

Year	Entrant	Class	Chassis	Engine	1	2	3	4	5	6	7	Rank	Points
2011	OAK Racing	LMP2	OAK Pescarolo 01	Judd-BMW HK 3.6 L V8	SEB; 3	SPA; 6	LMS; 7	IMO; 9	SIL	PET	ZHU		

=== 24 Hours of Le Mans results ===
Year	Team	Co-Drivers	Car	Class	Laps	Pos.	Class Pos.
2011	(France) OAK Racing	(France) Frédéric Da Rocha (France) Patrice Lafargue	OAK Pescarolo 01-Judd-BMW	LMP2	288	25th	7th

=== Complete World Touring Car Championship results ===
(key) (Races in bold indicate pole position) (Races in italics indicate fastest lap)

Year	Team	Car	1	2	3	4	5	6	7	8	9	10	11	12	13	14	15	16	17	18	19	20	21	22	23	24	DC	Points
2012	SUNRED Engineering	SEAT León 2.0 TDI	ITA; 1 Ret	ITA; 2; 15																							30th	0
2012	SUNRED Engineering	SUNRED SR León 1.6T			ESP; 1; 23	ESP; 2; 17	MAR; 1; 13	MAR; 2; 14	SVK; 1	SVK; 2	HUN; 1	HUN; 2	AUT; 1	AUT; 2	POR; 1	POR; 2	BRA; 1	BRA; 2	USA; 1	USA; 2	JPN; 1	JPN; 2	CHN; 1	CHN; 2	MAC; 1	MAC; 2	30th	0
