= Sun Red SR21 =

- Category: International GT Open GTA (2007-2008); International GT Open Super GT (2009)
- Constructor: Sunred Engineering
- Predecessor: none
- Successor: Sun Red SRX

Technical specifications
- Chassis: Steel tube chassis Closed carbon fiber bodywork
- Suspension (front): Double wishbone
- Suspension (rear): Double wishbone
- Length: 4920mm
- Width: 2000mm
- Axle track: Front: 1230mm Rear: 990mm
- Wheelbase: 2720mm
- Engine: Judd GV4 4.000cc V10 N/A Mid-engined
- Transmission: Hewland 6-speed sequential
- Weight: 1,140 kilograms (2,510 lb)
- Tyres: Dunlop

Competition history
- Notable entrants: (Spain) SUNRED
- Notable drivers: (Germany) Peter Terting (2007) (Spain) Juan Ramon Zapata (2007) (Spain) Víctor Fernández (2007-2009) (Spain) Jordi Gené (2007) (Spain) Lluis Llobet(2007-2009) (Venezuela) E. J. Viso (2007) (Spain) Óscar Fernández (2008-2009) (Spain) José-Manuel Perez-Aicart (2008) (Italy) Matteo Cressoni (2009) (France) Éric Cayrolle (2009) (Spain) Ferran Monje (2009) (Spain) Isaac Tutumlu (2009) (Andorra) Sintu Vives (2009)

The Sun Red SR21 is a Spanish-made sportscar which competed in the International GT Open between 2007 and 2009.

== Racing history ==
=== 2007 ===
The design for the Sun Red SR21 was based on the Hispano-Suiza HS21 concept car. The SR21 was built under FIA GT2 specifications, although it was never an homologated as such due to it not being a production GT car.

Manufacturer Sunred Engineering entered the car in the 2007 International GT Open season. The car was driven the full season by Juan Ramon Zapata and was joined by different guest drivers each race weekend. Zapata achieved 2 podium finishes in 12 races. Zapata was placed 14th in the final standings.

=== 2008 ===
Óscar Fernández and José-Manuel Perez-Aicart drove the full-time entry in the 2008 International GT Open season. Their best result was a third place during the final raceweekend at Circuit de Catalunya. The duo was placed 15th in the final standings.

=== 2009 ===
For the 2009 International GT Open season Sunred Engineering entered 2 SR21's. The number 14 car was driven by Víctor Fernández and Lluis Llobet, the number 15 car was driven by Óscar Fernández and Matteo Cressoni. The GTA class was renamed Super GT. The season was no success with only the number 15 car scoring points and ending 13th in the championship. At the end of the season the SR21 was retired.
