= Isaac Tutumlu =

Spanish racing driver (born 1985)

- Nationality: (Spain) Spanish
- Born: Isaac Tutumlu López; 5 July 1985 (age 41) Barcelona, Spain

Lamborghini Super Trofeo Europe career
- Debut season: 2015
- Current team: Leipert Motorsport
- Categorisation: FIA Silver (until 2022); FIA Bronze (2023–)
- Car number: 4
- Starts: 2
- Wins: 0
- Poles: 0
- Fastest laps: 0
- Best finish: 5th in 2014

Previous series
- 2012 2011 2011 2009, 11 2009 2009 2009 2007: WTCC; Superstars Series; European Production Series; Porsche Supercup; International GT Open; Spanish GT Championship; Porsche Carrera Cup Germany; Mitjet Series Spain

Isaac Tutumlu López (born 5 July 1985) is a Kurdish-Spanish racing driver. He currently races in the ADAC GT Masters, having formerly raced in the World Touring Car Championship, International GT Open, Porsche Supercup, 24 Hours of Daytona and others.

== Racing career ==
Tutumlu began his career racing in the karting championships in Catalonia (Spain). He moved into cars by competing in the Mitjet Series in 2007. In 2008, he won the Catalunya Touring Car Championship. In 2009, he began racing in GTs, competing in five rounds of the Porsche Supercup as well as starting International GT Open and Spanish GT Championship races.

At the start of 2011, Tutumlu entered the Superstars Series in a BMW M3 for the Spanish team Campos Racing. However, he would only participate in the first three rounds of the season. Later in the year he returned to the Porsche Supercup.

=== Porsche Supercup ===
Tutumlu first entered the Porsche Supercup when he entered five rounds at the championship with SANITEC Racing, starting with the Nürburgring. He raced in the championship until the penultimate round at Monza, as a guest driver he was ineligible to score points.

Tutumlu returned to the championship in 2011, beginning with a single race for MRS Team PZ Aschaffenburg at Monaco, however he was disqualified from the results. He reappeared at the Hungaroring with SANITEC Aquiles MRS Team and did two further races at Spa-Francorchamps and Abu Dhabi for Attempto Racing.

Tutumlu returned to the Porsche Supercup in 2012 with Attempto Racing, starting with the second round of the championship at Barcelona.

=== World Touring Car Championship ===
In 2012, Tutumlu signed to race in the World Touring Car Championship with Proteam Racing, again in a BMW. He was forced to miss the fourth round of the championship at the Slovakiaring due to damage sustained on his car in Marrakech. After the Race of Slovakia, he announced he would leave Proteam and the WTCC to return to the Porsche Supercup.

=== Blancpain Lamborghini Super Trofeo Europe ===
In 2015, Tutumlu was confirmed as a driver in the Lamborghini Super Trofeo Europe. He did not race in the first weekend of the year at Monza and started his season in Silverstone driving for Leipert Motorsport. His team-mate was the Austrian Gerhard Tweraser.

== Personal life ==
Isaac Tutumlu López is of Kurdish descent from his father side and is from Spanish descent from his mothers' side. He is a Kurdish nationalist and sported the flag of Kurdistan on his BMW during his World Touring Car Championship stint. Tutumlu is the son of football agent Bayram Tutumlu who is from Turkey.

== Racing record ==
=== Complete Porsche Supercup results ===
(key) (Races in bold indicate pole position) (Races in italics indicate fastest lap)

Year	Team	1	2	3	4	5	6	7	8	9	10	11	12	13	Pos.	Pts
2009	SANITEC Racing	BHR	BHR	ESP	MON	TUR	GBR	GER; 16	HUN; 13	ESP; Ret	BEL; 13	ITA; 13	UAE	UAE	NC	0‡
2011	MRS Team PZ Aschaffenburg	TUR	ESP	MON; DSQ	GER	GBR	GER								NC	0‡
2011	SANITEC Aquiles MRS Team							HUN; 12							NC	0‡
2011	Attempto Racing								BEL; 22	ITA	UAE; DSQ	UAE; 15			NC	0‡
2012	Förch Racing by Lukas MS	BHR	BHR	MON; 21	ESP; 9	GBR; 18	GER; 13	HUN; Ret	HUN; Ret	BEL; 17	ITA; 15				17th	21

‡ Not eligible for points

=== Complete World Touring Car Championship results ===
(key) (Races in bold indicate pole position) (Races in italics indicate fastest lap)

Year	Team	Car	1	2	3	4	5	6	7	8	9	10	11	12	13	14	15	16	17	18	19	20	21	22	23	24	Pos.	Pts
2012	Proteam Racing	BMW 320 TC	ITA; 1 Ret	ITA; 2; 17	ESP; 1; 16	ESP; 2; 11	MAR; 1 Ret	MAR; 2 DNS	SVK; 1	SVK; 2	HUN; 1	HUN; 2	AUT; 1	AUT; 2	POR; 1	POR; 2	BRA; 1	BRA; 2	USA; 1	USA; 2	JPN; 1	JPN; 2	CHN; 1	CHN; 2	MAC; 1	MAC; 2	NC	0
