= Pasquale Di Sabatino =

Italian racing driver

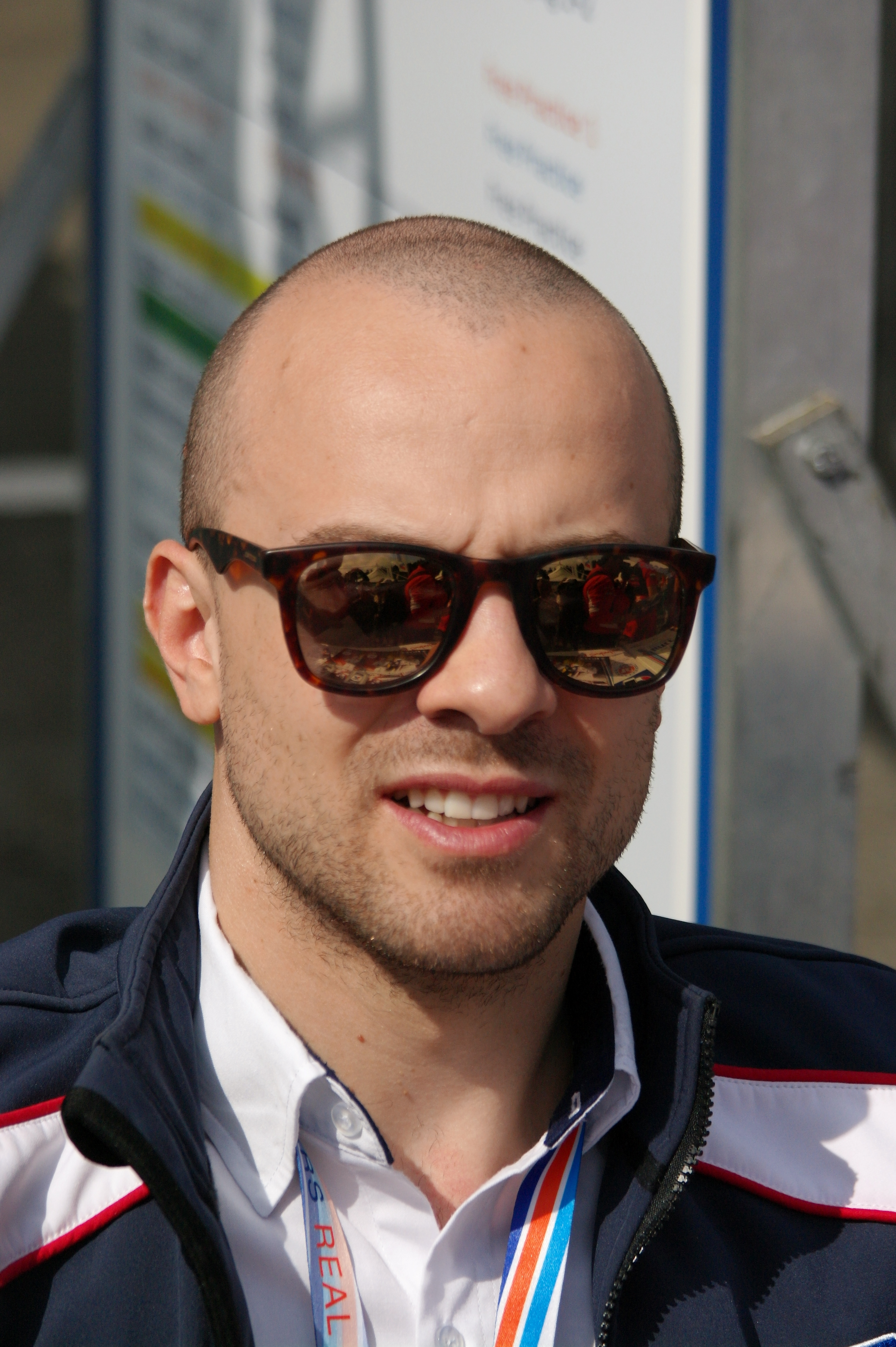
- Di Sabatino at the 2014 FIA WTCC Race of Belgium.
- Nationality: (Italy) Italian
- Born: 20 January 1988 (age 38) Atri (Italy)

World Touring Car Championship career
- Debut season: 2012
- Current team: Liqui Moly Team Engstler
- Car number: 8
- Former teams: bamboo-engineering
- Starts: 27
- Wins: 0
- Poles: 0
- Fastest laps: 0
- Best finish: 20th in 2014

Previous series
- 2011 2010 2006–09 2005–06 2005: Auto GP; Italian Formula Three; Formula Renault 3.5 Series; Italian Formula Renault 2.0; Italian Formula Junior 1600

Championship titles
- 2005: Italian Formula Junior 1600

Pasquale Di Sabatino (born 20 January 1988, in Atri) is an Italian former professional racing driver. He has previously competed in the Formula Renault 3.5 Series where he was a race winner. He drove in the World Touring Car Championship for bamboo-engineering in 2012.

== Career ==
=== Formula Junior ===
After an early career in karting, Di Sabatino stepped up to single–seaters in 2005, racing in the Italian Formula Junior 1600 series. Driving for the Tomcat Racing team, he secured ten podium places in twelve races, including five victories, to comfortably win the title ahead of Mihai Marinescu and former Scuderia Toro Rosso Formula One driver Jaime Alguersuari.

=== Formula Renault 2.0 ===
In November 2005, Di Sabatino graduated to Formula Renault, taking part in the Italian Formula Renault 2.0 Winter Series held at Adria International Raceway. In the four races he contested he took one podium place to finish tenth in the standings.

The following year, he raced in the full Italian Formula Renault 2.0 championship, but failed to score a point in the twelve races he entered.

=== Formula Renault 3.5 Series ===
In July 2006, Di Sabatino made his debut in the Formula Renault 3.5 Series, replacing Miloš Pavlović at Italian team Cram Competition. He failed to score a point in the ten races he contested, with his best result being a pair of 16th-place finishes.

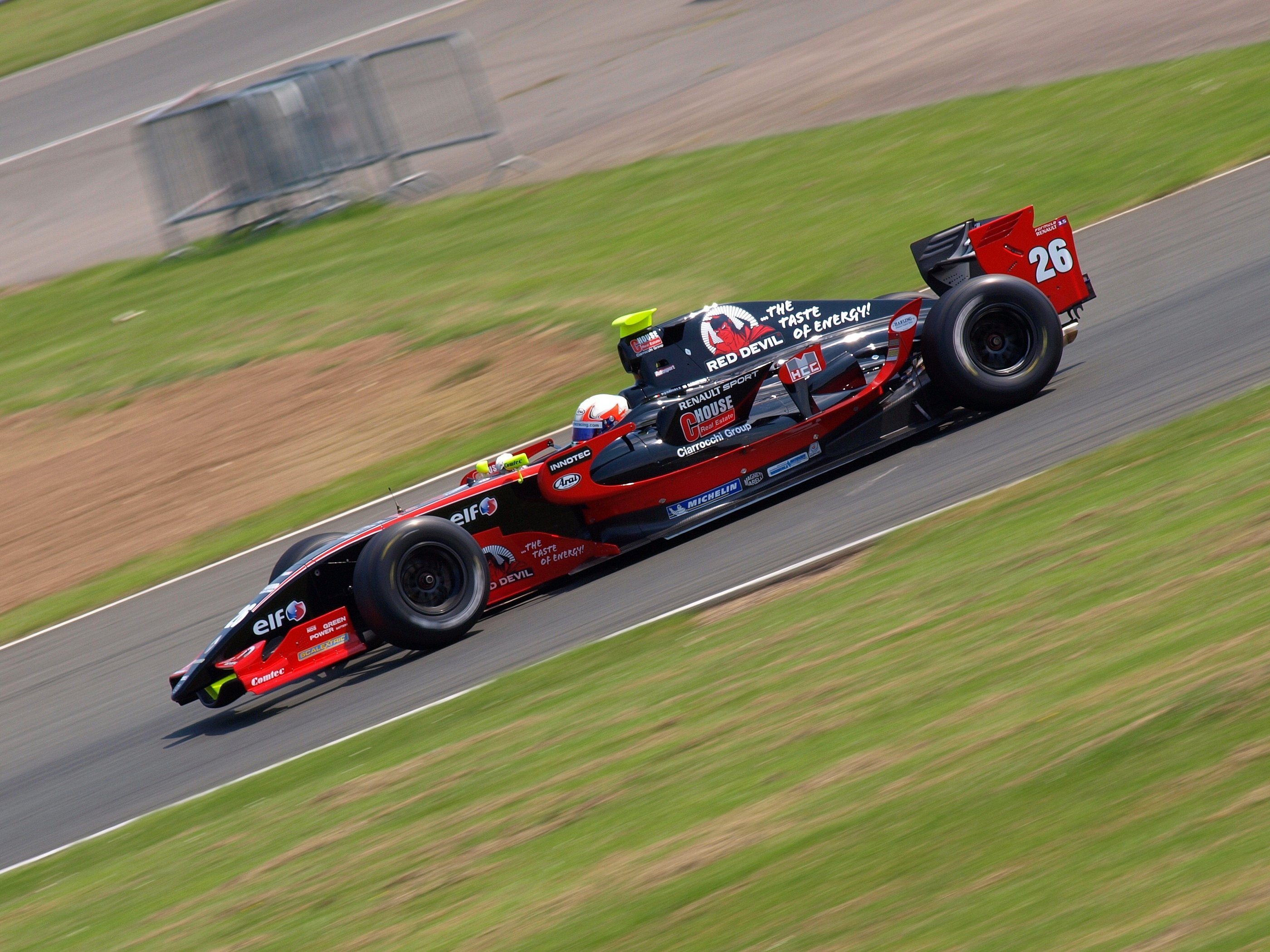
Di Sabatino driving for Comtec at the Silverstone round of the 2008 Formula Renault 3.5 Series season.

For 2007, Di Sabatino took part in a full season with another Italian team, GD Racing. He took one points finish during the season, a ninth place at Spa–Francorchamps, to finish 26th in the championship. During the off–season, he tested for both RC Motorsport and Comtec Racing before signing for the latter in January 2008.

At the first race of the 2008 season in Monza, Di Sabatino finished second to Dutchman Giedo van der Garde, scoring his best Formula Renault 3.5 Series finish at the time. He followed that up with a tenth-place finish in the second race and then an eighth place at Spa–Francorchamps a week later. However, Di Sabatino was forced to vacate his seat after the Le Mans round after encountering sponsorship issues.

In March 2009, Di Sabatino tested again for RC Motorsport at the Circuit de Catalunya in Spain before signing for the team early the following month. After scoring points in three of the first four races, Di Sabatino finally claimed his maiden series victory in the second race of the Hungaroring event in mid–June. Before the end of the season, Di Sabatino ran out of funding and had to give up his seat at RC. Despite this, he finished twelfth in the championship.

=== Formula Three ===
For the 2010 season, Di Sabatino returned to his native Italy to compete in the Italian Formula Three Championship for Alan Racing. After failing to score a point in any of the opening four races, he left the team after the second round of the year at Hockenheim. He missed the following round of the series at Imola before being signed by RC Motorsport to replace Francesco Castellacci at Mugello, who missed the event due to illness.

However, Di Sabatino, along with his teammate Frédéric Vervisch, failed to start either race of the meeting after encountering engine problems during practice.

=== Auto GP ===
Di Sabatino competed in the Auto GP series in 2011, replacing Samuele Buttarelli at Ombra Racing, with Buttarelli moving to fellow Italian team TP Formula. Di Sabatino followed him after the first round, he completed the season with TP Formula and finished 12th in the championship.

=== World Touring Car Championship ===
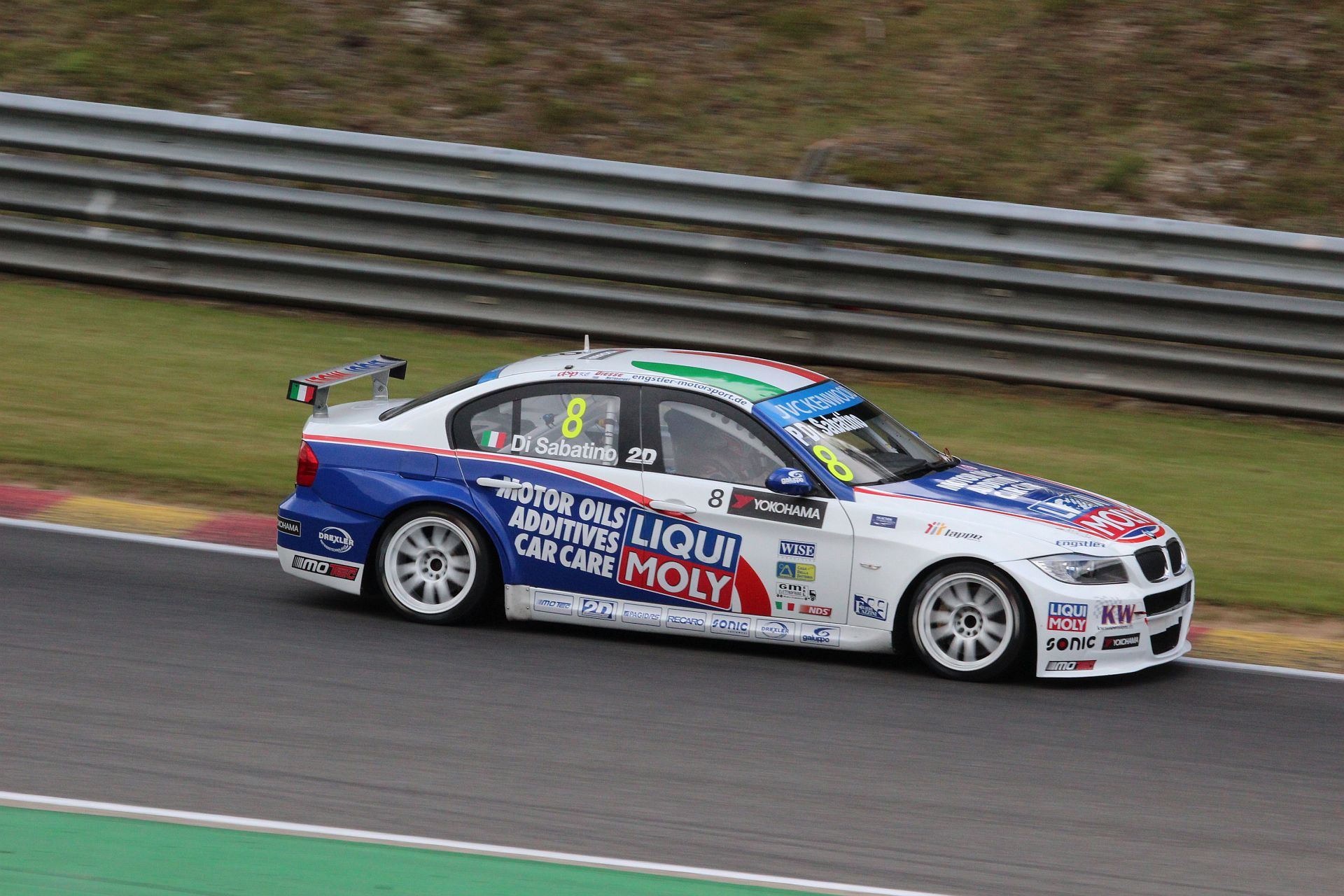
Di Sabatino driving the Engstler Motorsport BMW 320TC at Spa-Francorchamps during the 2014 World Touring Car Championship season.

In February 2012, it was confirmed that Di Sabatino would switch to touring cars, racing in the World Touring Car Championship for Bamboo Engineering. He raced a Chevrolet Cruze 1.6T alongside fellow newcomer Alex MacDowall. He was replaced by Michel Nykjær for the Race of Brazil having suffered from bronchitis and pneumonia and not being able to fly. Di Sabatino did not return to the championship in 2012 and was not classified in the drivers' championship having scored no points.

== Racing record ==
=== Career summary ===
Season	Series	Team	Races	Wins	Poles	F/Laps	Podiums	Points	Position
2005	Italian Formula Junior 1600	Tomcat Racing	12	5	3	?	10	268	**1st**
2005	Italian Formula Renault 2.0 - Winter Series	Tomcat Racing	4	0	0	0	1	12	10th
2006	Italian Formula Renault 2.0	Tomcat Racing	12	0	0	?	0	0	36th
2006	Formula Renault 3.5 Series	Cram Competition	10	0	0	0	0	0	39th
2007	Formula Renault 3.5 Series	GD Racing	17	0	0	0	0	2	26th
2008	Formula Renault 3.5 Series	Comtec Racing	13	0	0	0	1	16	20th
2009	Formula Renault 3.5 Series	RC Motorsport	15	1	0	0	2	39	12th
2010	Italian Formula Three Championship	Alan Racing	4	0	0	0	0	0	30th
2010	Italian Formula Three Championship	RC Motorsport	4	0	0	0	0	0	30th
2011	Auto GP	Ombra Racing	14	0	0	0	0	38	12th
2012	World Touring Car Championship	bamboo-engineering	14	0	0	0	0	0	NC

=== Complete Formula Renault 3.5 Series results ===
(key) (Races in bold indicate pole position) (Races in italics indicate fastest lap)

Year	Team	1	2	3	4	5	6	7	8	9	10	11	12	13	14	15	16	17	Pos	Pts
2006	Cram Competition	ZOL; 1	ZOL; 2	MON; 1	IST; 1	IST; 2	MIS; 1	MIS; 2	SPA; 1; 16	SPA; 2; 19	NÜR; 1; 20	NÜR; 2; 18	DON; 1; 24	DON; 2; 20	LMS; 1; 25	LMS; 2; 16	CAT; 1; 24	CAT; 2 Ret	39th	0
2007	GD Racing	MNZ; 1 Ret	MNZ; 2 Ret	NÜR; 1; 20	NÜR; 2; 14	MON; 1; 18	HUN; 1; 13	HUN; 2; 11	SPA; 1 Ret	SPA; 2; 9	DON; 1; 19	DON; 2; 15	MAG; 1; 11	MAG; 2; 12	EST; 1; 15	EST; 2; 21	CAT; 1; 16	CAT; 2 Ret	26th	2
2008	Red Devil Comtec Racing	MNZ; 1; 2	MNZ; 2; 10	SPA; 1; 13	SPA; 2; 8	MON; 1 Ret	SIL; 1; 11	SIL; 2; 14	HUN; 1; 11	HUN; 2; 11	NÜR; 1 Ret	NÜR; 2; 15	LMS; 1; 12	LMS; 2; 14	EST; 1	EST; 2	CAT; 1	CAT; 2	20th	16
2009	RC Motorsport	CAT; 1; 11	CAT; 2; 8	SPA; 1; 8	SPA; 2; 8	MON; 1 Ret	HUN; 1; 14	HUN; 2; 1	SIL; 1 Ret	SIL; 2 Ret	LMS; 1; 2	LMS; 2; 8	ALG; 1; 14	ALG; 2; 18	NÜR; 1; 10	NÜR; 2 Ret	ALC; 1	ALC; 2	12th	39

=== Complete Auto GP results ===
(key) (Races in bold indicate pole position) (Races in italics indicate fastest lap)

Year	Team	1	2	3	4	5	6	7	8	9	10	11	12	13	14	Pos	Pts
2011	Ombra Racing	MNZ; 1; 7	MNZ; 2; 12													12th	38
2011	TP Formula			HUN; 1; 8	HUN; 2; 8	BRN; 1; 5	BRN; 2; 13	DON; 1; 10	DON; 2 Ret	OSC; 1; 7	OSC; 2; 4	VAL; 1; 11	VAL; 2; 10	MUG; 1; 9	MUG; 2; 10	12th	38

=== Complete World Touring Car Championship results ===
(key) (Races in bold indicate pole position) (Races in italics indicate fastest lap)

Year	Team	Car	1	2	3	4	5	6	7	8	9	10	11	12	13	14	15	16	17	18	19	20	21	22	23	24	Pos	Pts
2012	bamboo-engineering	Chevrolet Cruze 1.6T	ITA; 1; 14	ITA; 2; 19	ESP; 1; 22	ESP; 2; 16	MAR; 1; 17	MAR; 2; 15	SVK; 1; 13	SVK; 2; 12	HUN; 1; 12	HUN; 2; 15	AUT; 1; 12	AUT; 2; 15	POR; 1; 15	POR; 2; 17	BRA; 1	BRA; 2	USA; 1	USA; 2	JPN; 1	JPN; 2	CHN; 1	CHN; 2	MAC; 1	MAC; 2	NC	0
2014	Liqui Moly Team Engstler	BMW 320 TC	MAR; 1; 13	MAR; 2; 9	FRA; 1; 17	FRA; 2; 17	HUN; 1; 15	HUN; 2; 16	SVK; 1; 18	SVK; 2 C	AUT; 1; 17	AUT; 2; 12	RUS; 1; 17	RUS; 2; 14	BEL; 1; 21	BEL; 2; 17	ARG; 1	ARG; 2	BEI; 1	BEI; 2	CHN; 1	CHN; 2	JPN; 1	JPN; 2	MAC; 1	MAC; 2	20th	2

Sporting positions
Preceded by Unknown	Italian Formula Junior 1600; Champion; 2005	Succeeded by Augusto Scalbi
