= Proteam Motorsport =

(Italy) Proteam Motorsport
- Founded: 1997
- Team principal(s): (Italy) Valmiro Presenzini
- Current series: World Touring Car Championship
- Teams' Championships: 2005 Independent WTCC; 2007 Independent WTCC; 2008 Independent WTCC
- Drivers' Championships: 2008 Independent WTCC(Sergio Hernández); 2010 Independent WTCC(Sergio Hernández); 2011 Jay-Ten Trophy WTCC(Fabio Fabiani)

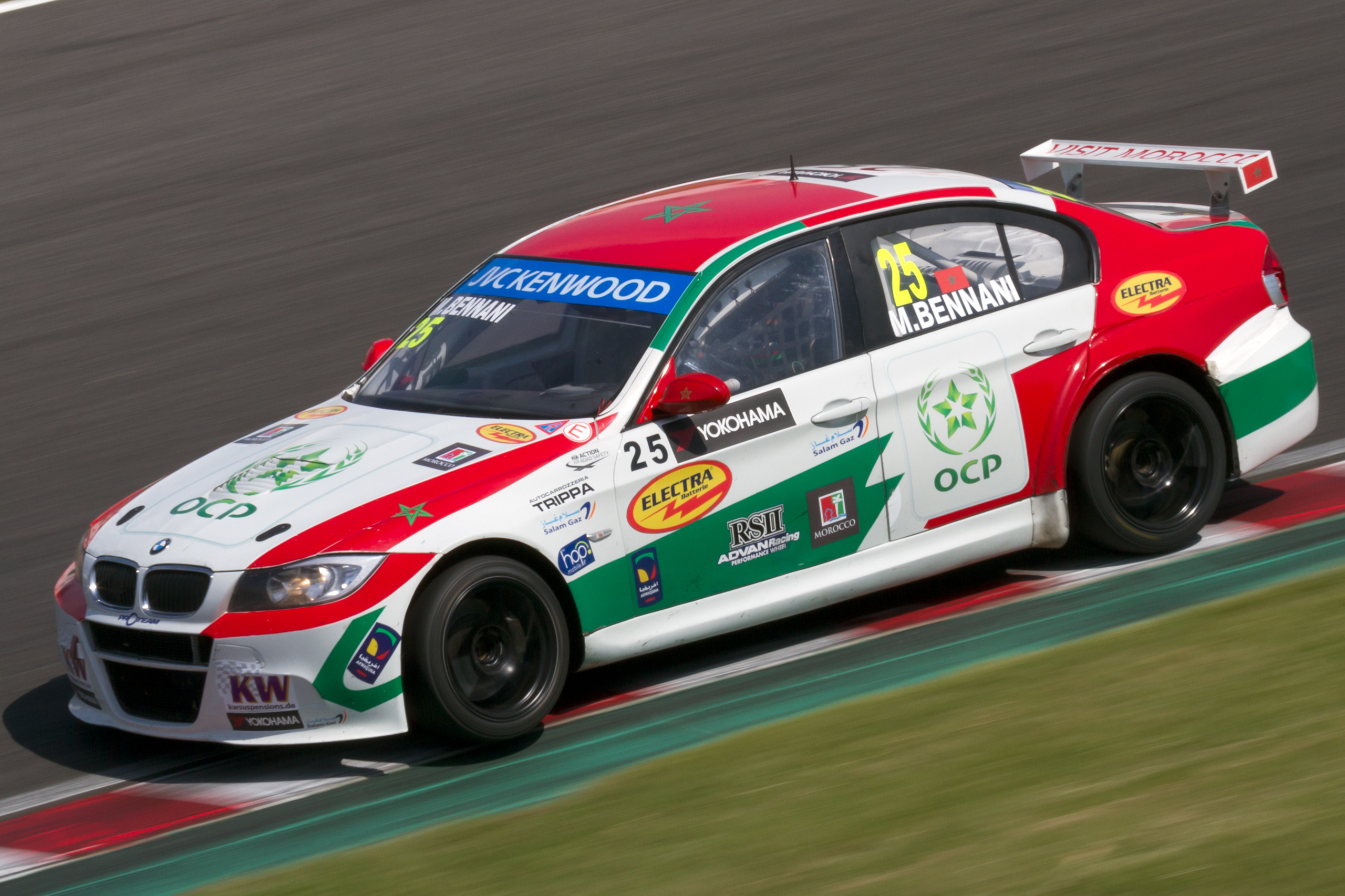

Proteam Motorsport is an Italian auto racing team based in Arezzo that was set up by former driver Valmiro Presenzini in 1997. They are best known for their efforts in the FIA World Touring Car Championship. Their time in the WTCC has seen them become the most successful independent team in the championship, winning three Independent Team titles in 1996, 2007 and 2008. Initially the team would enter Renault related events across Europe. Presenzini himself competed in The Renault Clio Cup, Renault 5 Turbo Cup and the Megane cup. After success in these series, they started a programme for the European Touring Car Championship, which they entered in 2003. They have entered cars in the Italian Clio Cup, the Ferrari Challenge, and as of 2006, the Italian Superturismo Championship with driver Cristian Ricciarini.

== WTCC ==
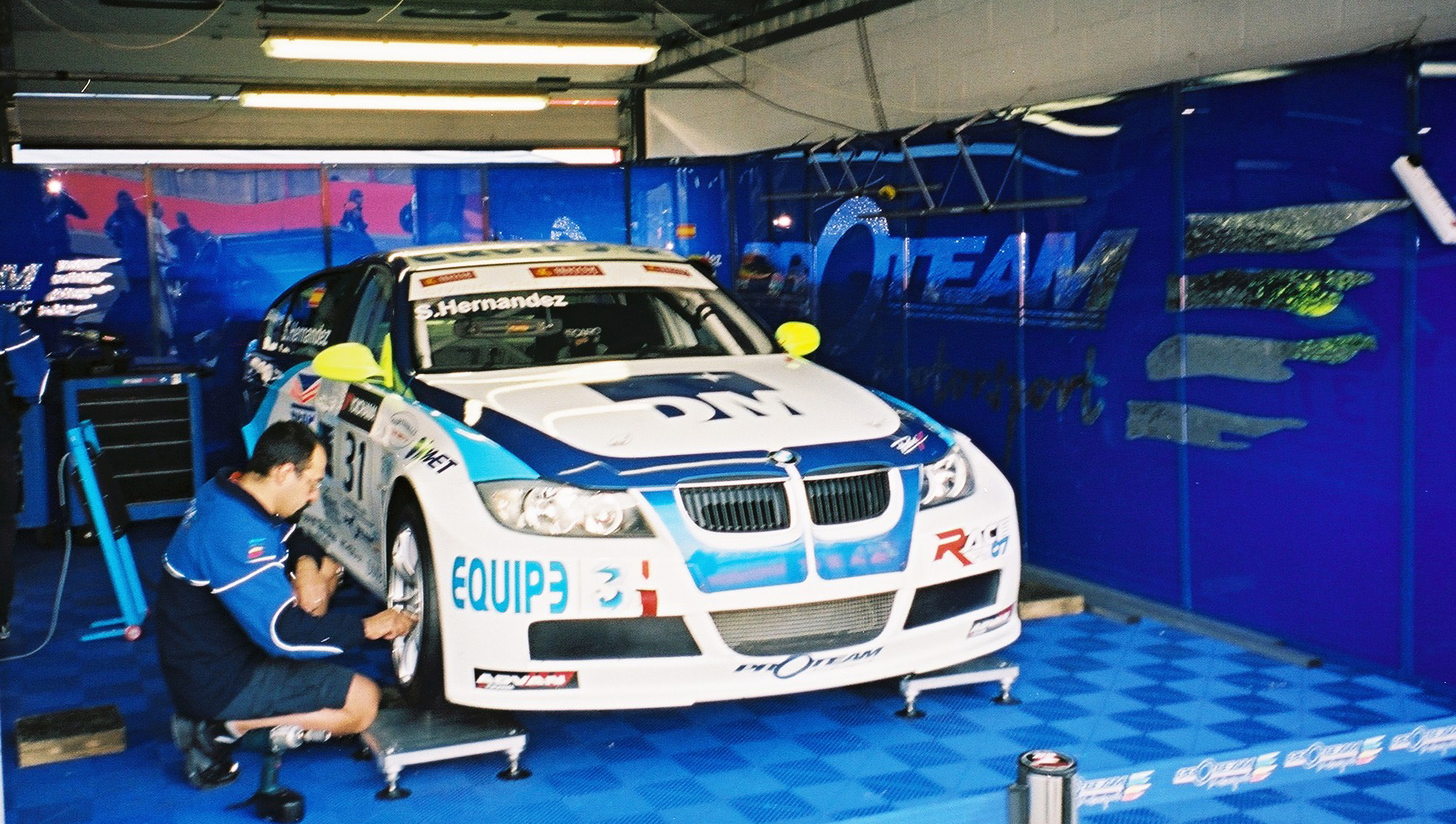
The Proteam Motorsport pit garage in the 2007 WTCC at Brands Hatch

.

=== 2005 season ===
Proteam entered the inaugural WTCC season with two BMW 320i's. Two Italian drivers competed a full season, Stefano D'Aste and Giuseppe Cirò. They won the independent teams title, with Cirò finishing as runner-up in the independents trophy, with D'Aste finishing third. They managed a highly impressive result in round twelve at spa, D'Aste managed a podium finish, coming second overall.

=== 2006 season ===
Cirò was replaced in the team by Luca Rangoni, who managed two podium finishes at Valencia. despite this, he was runner up at the end of the season in the independents trophy. Again D'Aste was third. Proteam lost out on the teams title to GR Asia, who had trophy winner Tom Coronel driving for them.

=== 2007 season ===
For 2007, D'Aste left the team for rival independent team Wiechers Sport and was replaced by Spaniard Sergio Hernández. Italian Davide Roda competed for the team in just two rounds at Brno. The cars were replaced by new BMW 320si's. Another podium saw Rangoni as high as fourteenth in the overall points. Hernández also finished in the points with an eighth at Valenci. This helped Proteam regain the independents team title. Former proteam driver D'Aste won the independents trophy.

=== 2008 season ===
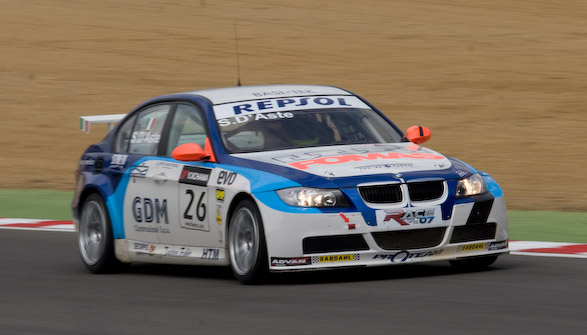
Proteam Motorsport in the 2008 WTCC at Brands Hatch driven by Stefano D'Aste

Rangoni left the WTCC after 2007, and this led to a return to Proteam for D'Aste, the defending independent champion. It was Hernández who was the star of the season, often racing up amongst the works drivers. He managed to finish in the points three times, including a podium at Okayama, D'Aste also managed two points, with a seventh place at Brands Hatch. When D'Aste failed to attend the final rounds at Macau, due to a protest for a grid penalty, he was replaced by Bulgarian George Tanev. Hernández won the independents trophy, and Proteam successfully defended the teams title.

=== 2009 season ===
With Hernández gone to the works BMW Team Italy-Spain and D'Aste gone to Wiechers-Sport, Proteam needed two new drivers for 2009. Tanev first signed for a full season. He was followed by Félix Porteiro, who switched teams with Hernández from BMW Team Italy-Spain. A third car was entered in selected rounds for Italian driver Vito Postiglione. Tanev left the championship after the third round and guest appearances were made late in the season by Fabio Fabiani and Nobuteru Taniguchi. Despite a strong start to the year, Porteiro finished as runner-up in the Yokohama Independents' Trophy.

=== 2010 season ===
Sergio Hernández came back to the team after BMW reduced their works entry to just two cars. Stefano d'Aste also made another return to Proteam from Wiechers-Sport. The pair were joined on some occasions by Fabio Fabiani, Nobuteru Taniguchi and Kevin Chen. Hernández won the Yokohama Independents' Trophy and Proteam won the Yokohama Teams' Trophy.
