= Sunred Engineering =

Auto racing team

(Spain) Sunred Engineering
- Founded: 2004
- Team principal(s): Joán Orus; Guillaume Bastone
- Current series: World Touring Car Championship; FIA GT1 World Championship; European Touring Car Cup; SEAT León Eurocup
- Teams' Championships: 2009 WTCC Teams' Trophy
- Drivers' Championships: 2009 WTCC Independents' Trophy (Coronel)

Sunred (short for Sun Race Engineering Development S.L.) is a Spanish-based auto racing team and constructor. They are best known for competing in the World Touring Car Championship.

== Racing History ==
While in the past Sunred had participated in GT races with the SEAT Cupra GT, in the WTCC they made their debut with another SEAT car at the start of the 2008 season, running Tom Coronel in a SEAT León TFSI for the full season. They also ran an additional car for the highest points-scorer in the WTCC-supporting SEAT León Eurocup at the previous weekend. One of these drivers in 2008 was Tom Boardman, who in 2009 Sunred signed to drive full-time alongside Coronel in their WTCC team.

In 2010, they ran the SEAT factory supported SR-Sport team, with ex-SEAT drivers Gabriele Tarquini, Tiago Monteiro and Jordi Gené driving León TDIs alongside Coronel. They also ran two TDIs under the Sunred banner for rookies Michel Nykjær and Fredy Barth.

In 2012, Sunred was announced to field Ford GTs in the FIA GT1 World Championship.

They also run cars in the SEAT León Eurocup and Spanish equivalent, the León Supercopa.

Sunred also build and run the SunRed SR21 in the International GT Open and Spanish GT Championship.

== Gallery ==
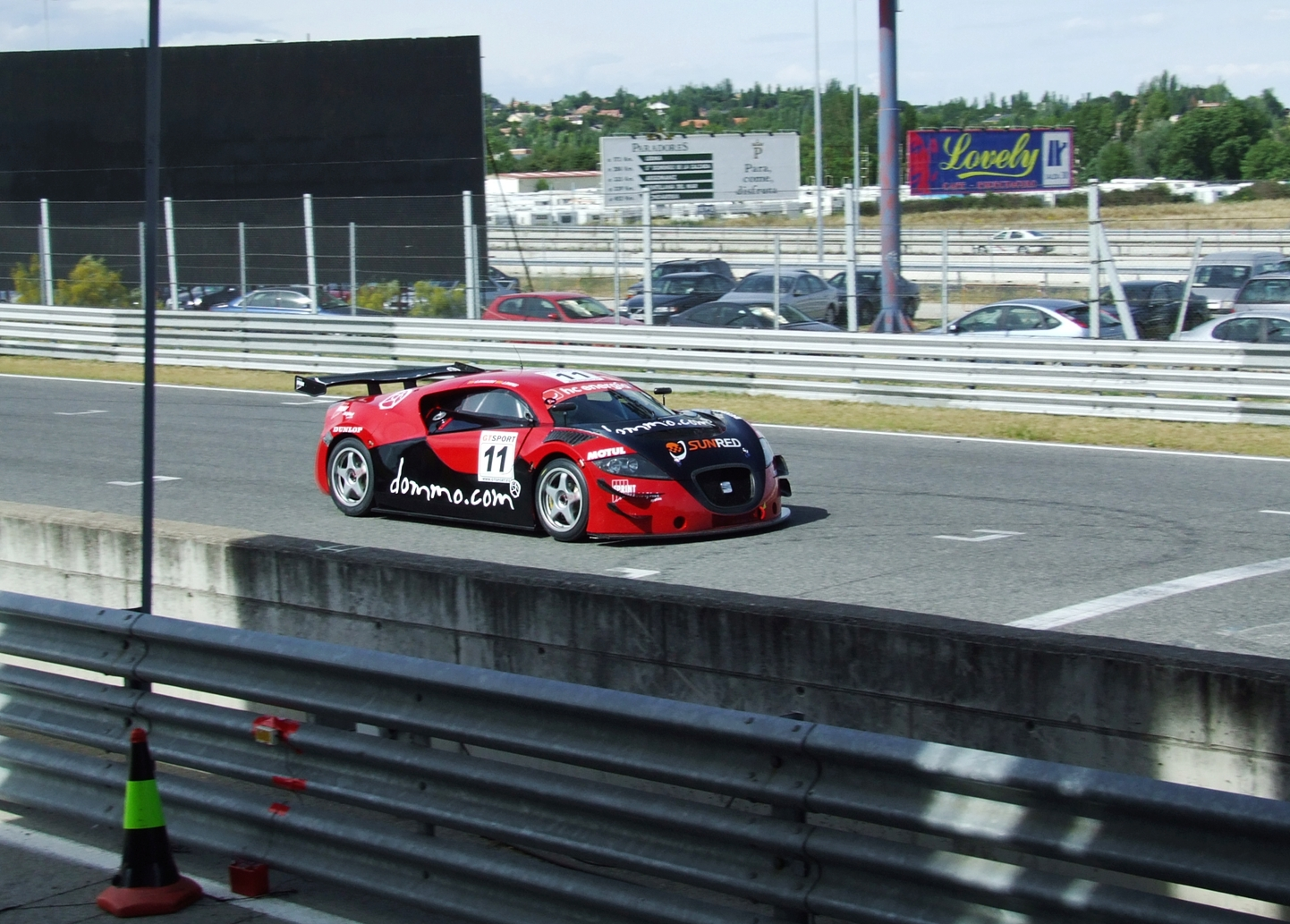
G. Vivancos and J. Vinyes in a SEAT Cupra GT in the Spanish GT Championship 2006.

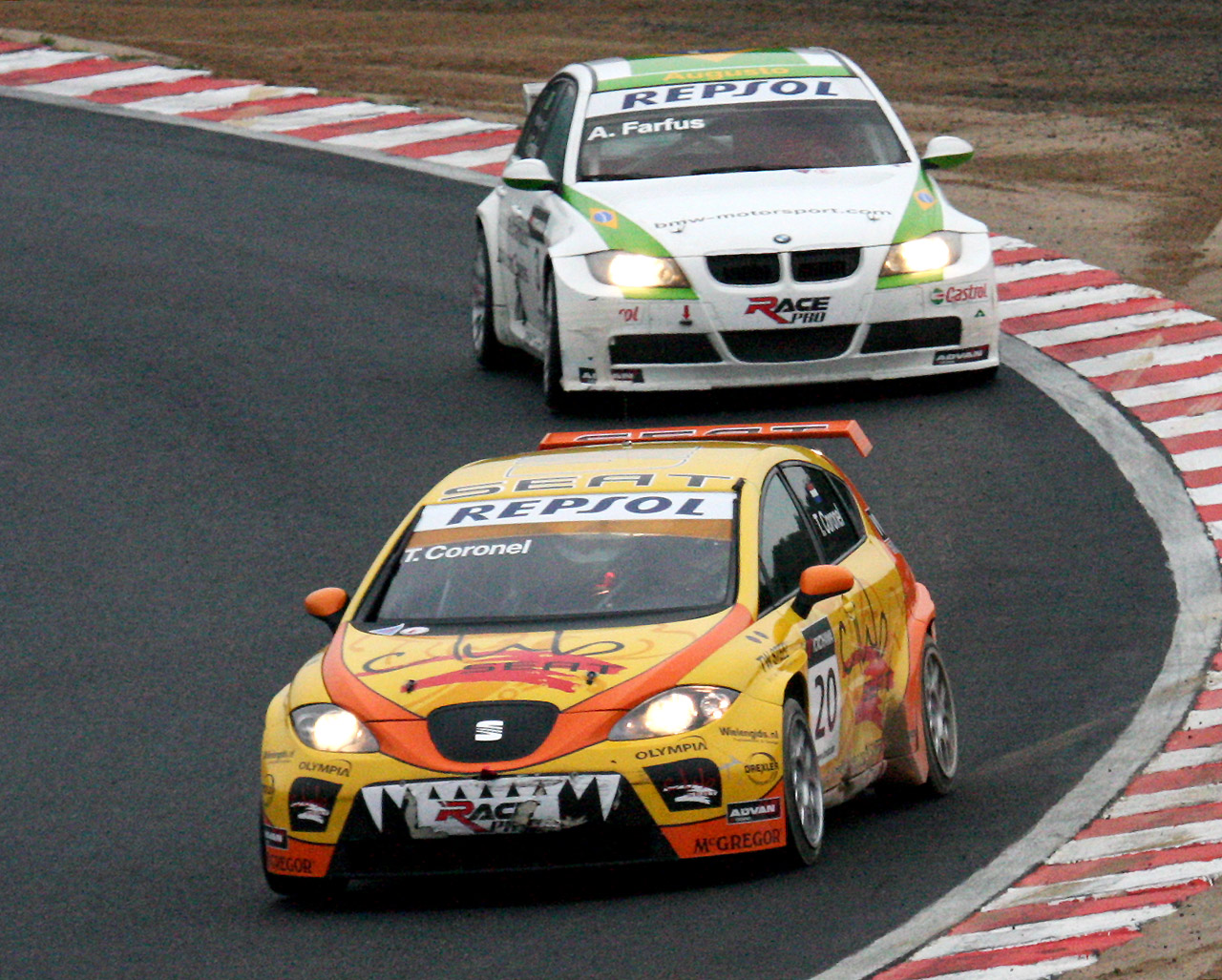
Tom Coronel and Augusto Farfus at the 2008 WTCC Race of Japan.

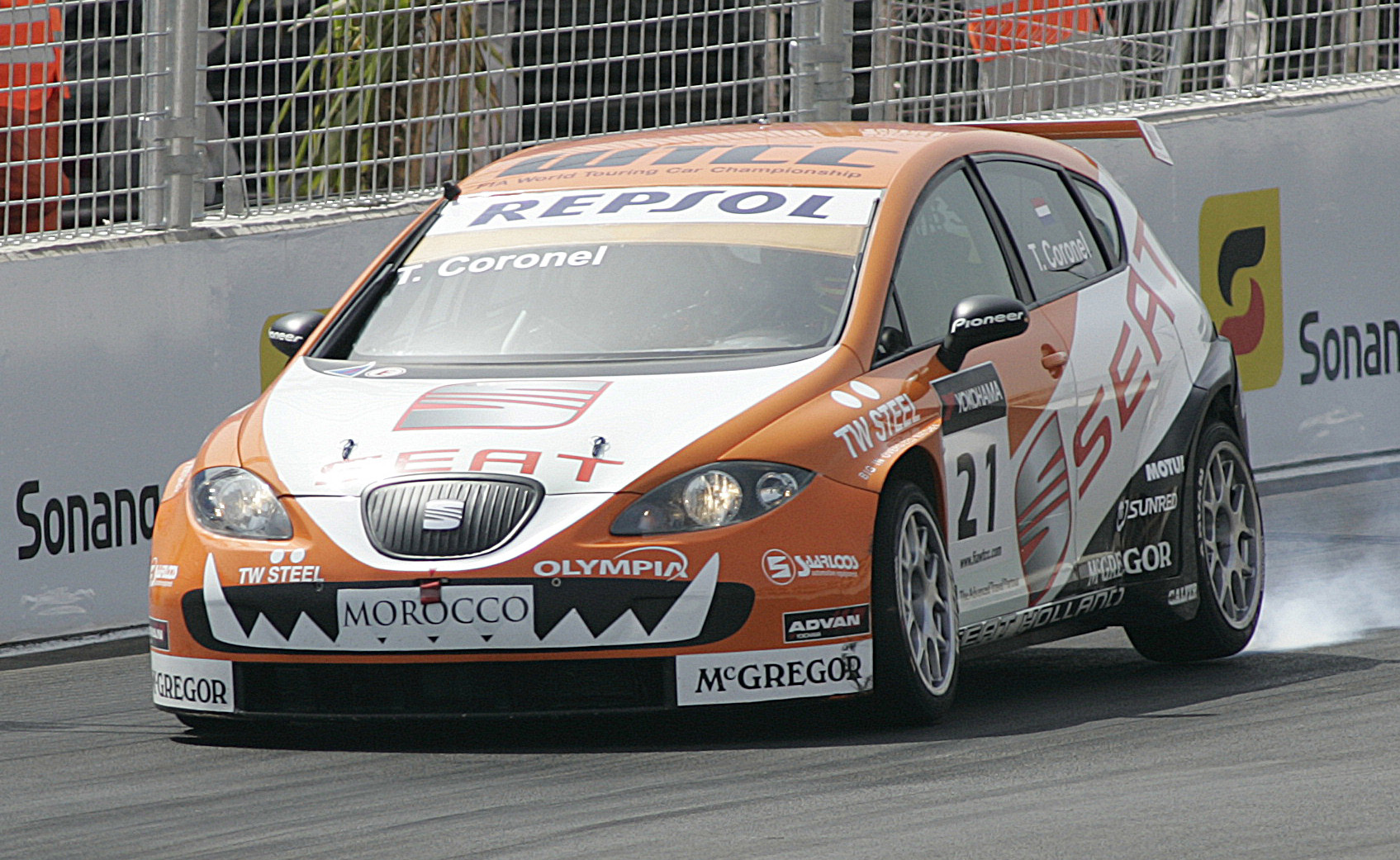
Tom Coronel driving for Sunred at the 2009 WTCC Race of Morocco.

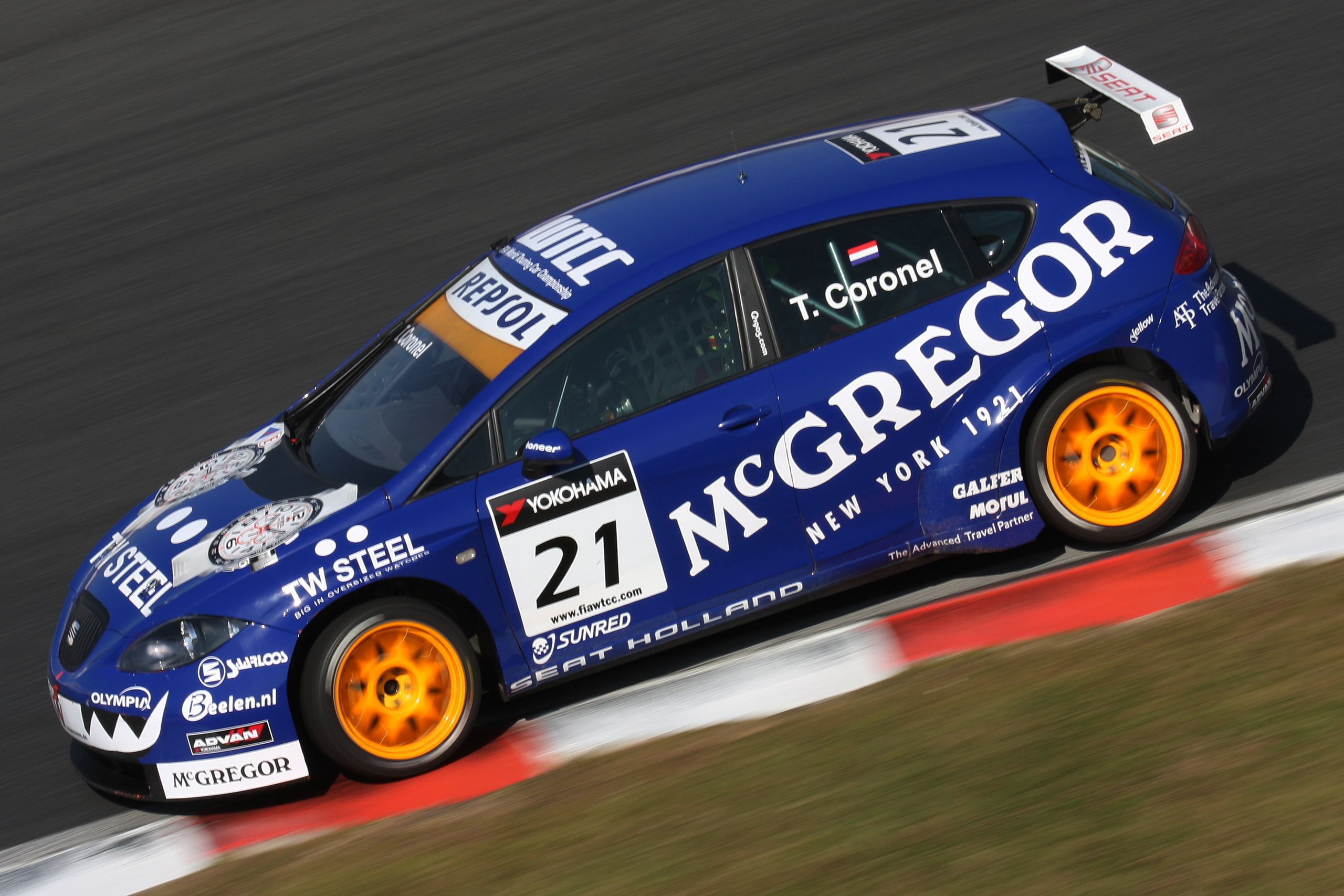
Tom Coronel at the 2009 WTCC Race of Japan.

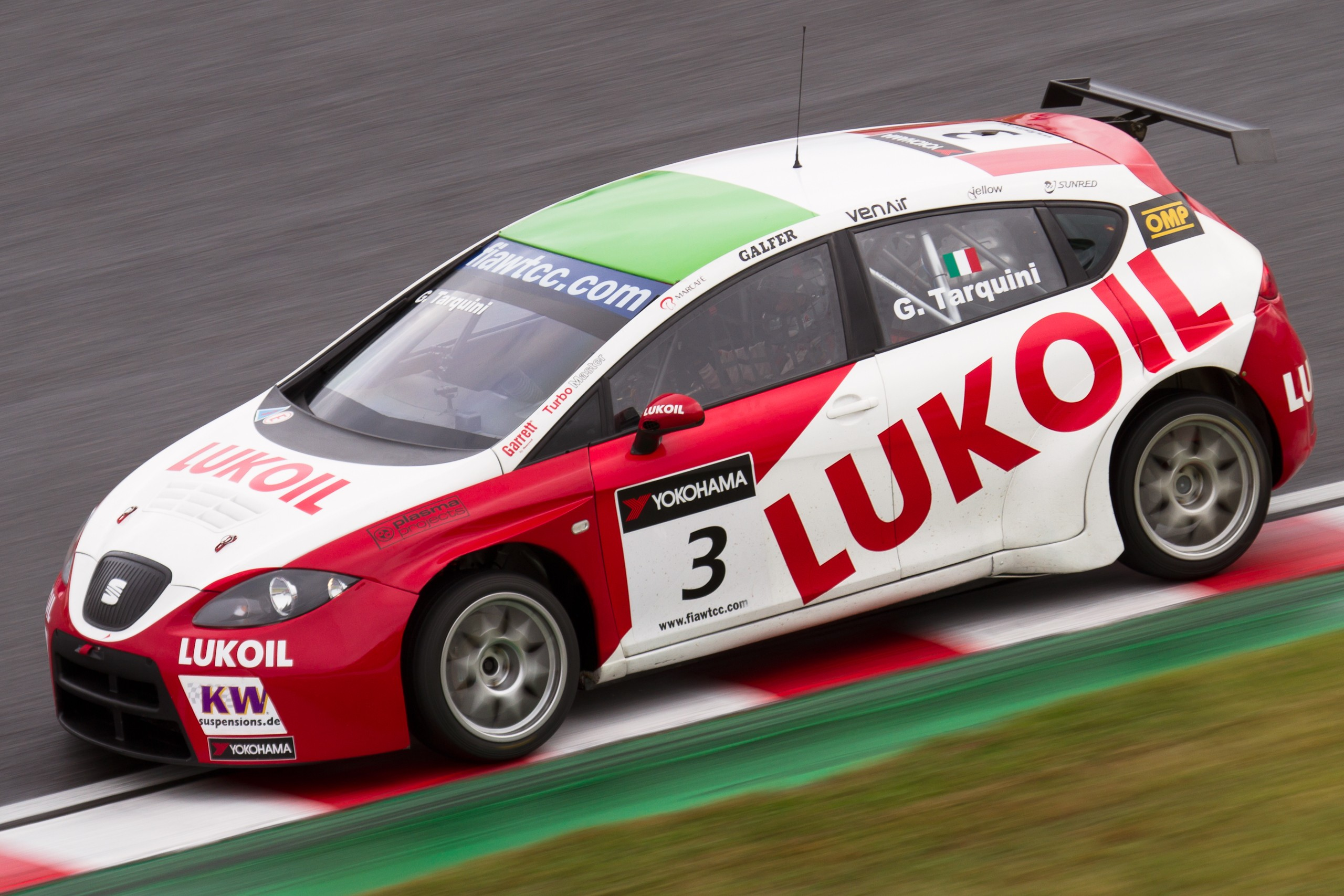
Gabriele Tarquini at the 2011 WTCC Race of Japan.
