= Sam Tordoff =

British racing driver (born 1989)

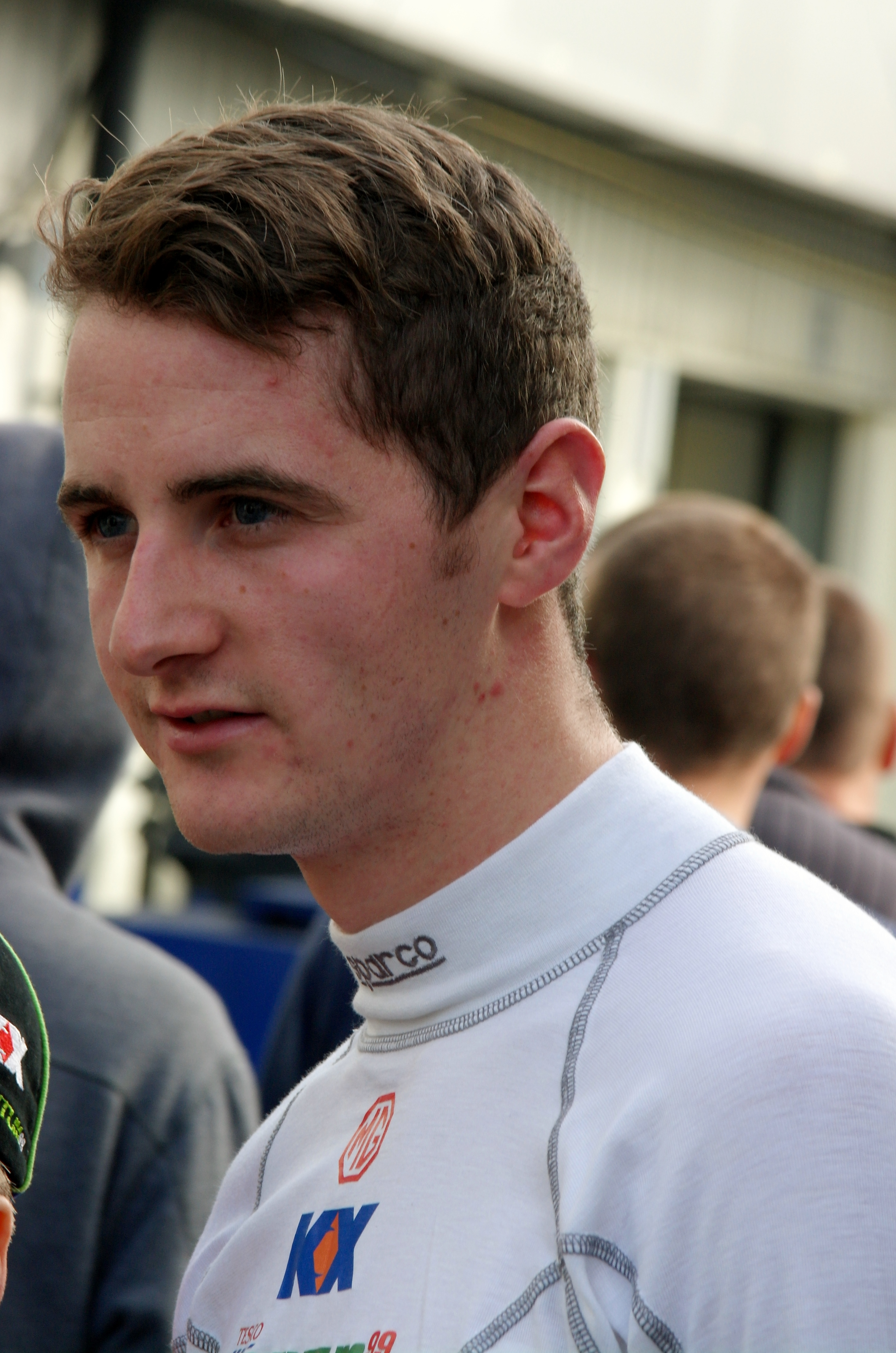
- Tordoff at the Silverstone round of the 2013 British Touring Car Championship season.
- Nationality: (United Kingdom) British
- Born: Samuel Lewis Tordoff; 19 April 1989 (age 37) Bradford (England)

British Touring Car Championship career
- Debut season: 2010
- Current team: Cobra Sport AmD AutoAid/RCIB Insurance
- Categorisation: FIA Silver (until 2016); FIA Gold (2017–)
- Car number: 600
- Former teams: Team GardX Racing with Motorbase; West Surrey Racing; Triple 8 Race Engineering
- Starts: 172
- Wins: 8
- Poles: 7
- Fastest laps: 13
- Best finish: 2nd in 2016

Previous series
- 2017 2011–12 2011–12 2009–10: British GT Championship; Porsche Supercup; Porsche Carrera Cup GB; Renault Clio Cup

Awards
- 2010–11: BRDC Rising Star

Samuel Lewis Tordoff (born 19 April 1989) is a British racing driver best known for his appearances in the British Touring Car Championship. He is the grandson of rally driver and car dealer Jack Tordoff. Tordoff finished second overall in the 2016 British Touring Car Championship, two points behind Gordon Shedden. Tordoff supports his racing career with his day-to-day job as an accountant.

== Racing career ==
=== Renault Clio Cup UK ===
In February 2009, Bradford-born Tordoff joined the Renault Clio Cup UK grid with Total Control Racing. He took his first podium finish in the Saturday race at Snetterton with second place behind Alex MacDowall, then followed this up by taking his maiden win with a lights to flag victory ahead of championship leader Phil Glew. Tordoff finished eighth in his first season of car racing.

Tordoff continued in the Clio Cup in 2010, where he finished on the podium at 12 out of the 18 races he competed in. Tordoff took his first win of the year in race two at Snetterton in almost the same circumstances as his first, the previous season. He finished third in the championship having missed the final round at Brands Hatch to race in the British Touring Car Championship, becoming the fifth Clio Cup graduate to compete in the BTCC, in 2010.

=== British Touring Car Championship ===
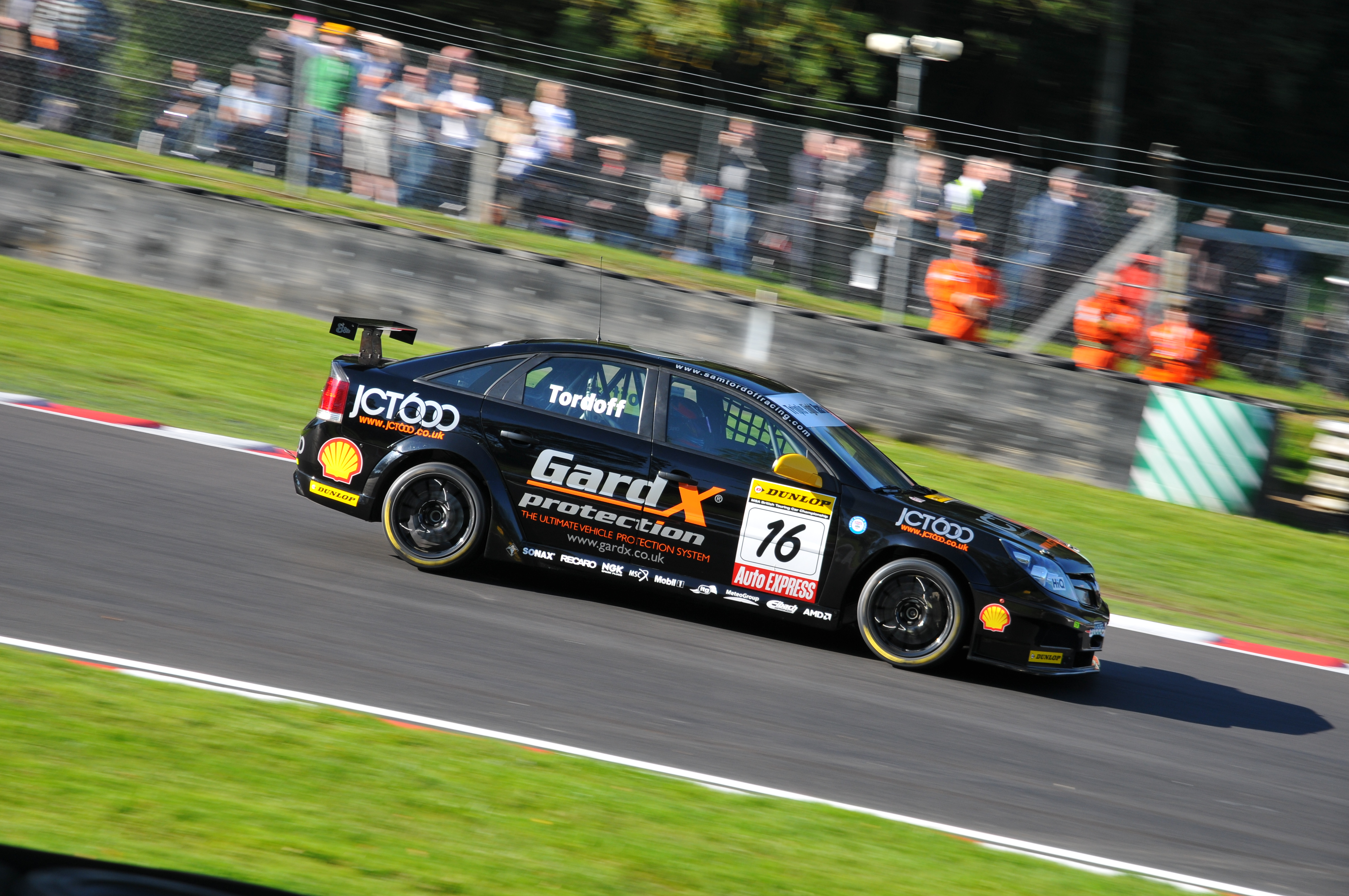
Tordoff driving the Triple Eight Racing Vauxhall Vectra at Brands Hatch during the 2010 British Touring Car Championship season.

==== Triple 8 Race Engineering (2010; 2013–2014) ====
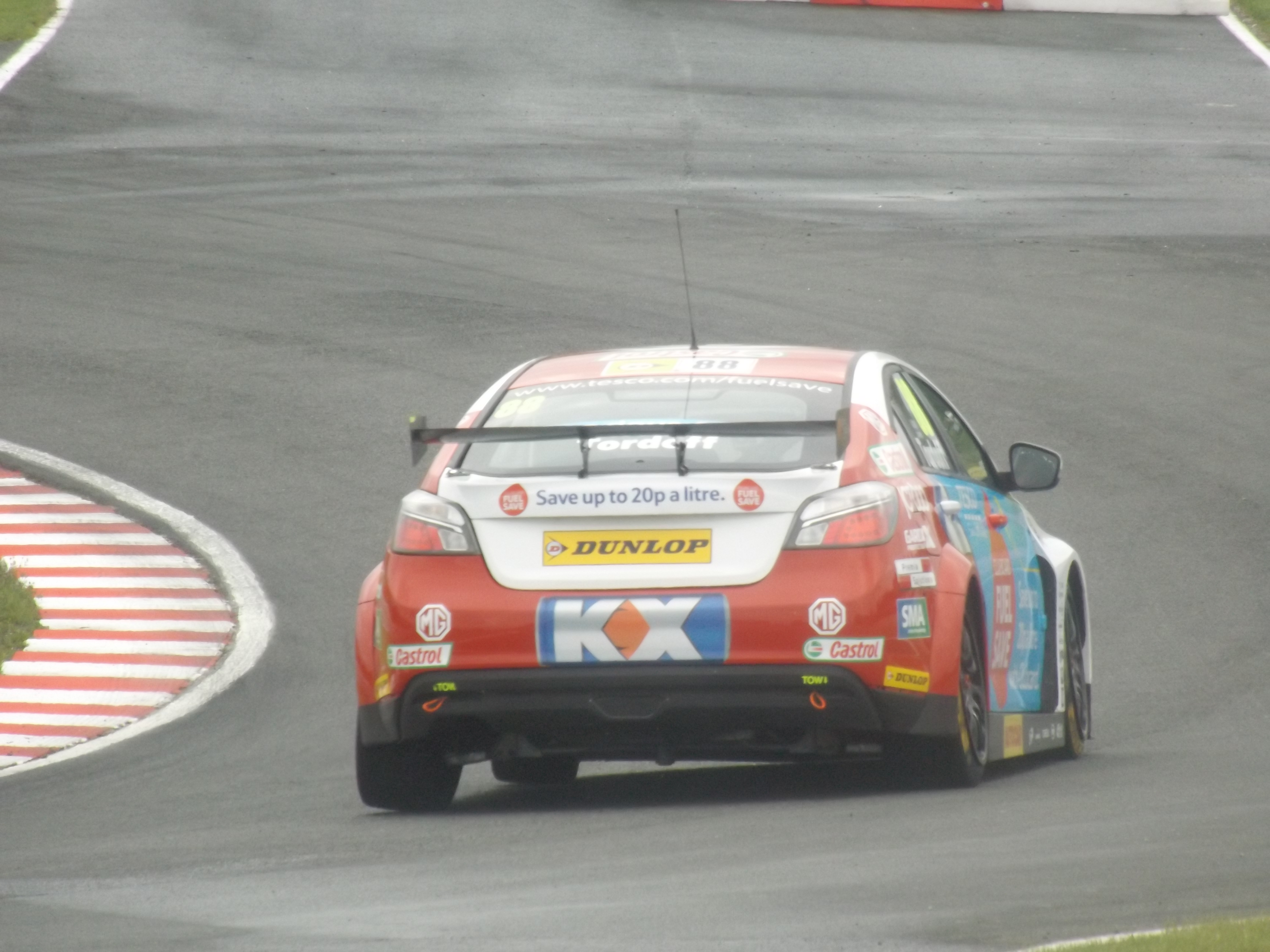
Tordoff competing at Oulton Park in 2014.

Tordoff made his British Touring Car Championship debut competing in the final meeting of the 2010 season at Brands Hatch, driving a Vauxhall Vectra for Uniq Racing with Triple Eight. In the final round he placed 10th, scoring one championship point.

Tordoff returned to the BTCC in 2013 driving for Triple 8 Race Engineering, now branded as MG KX Momentum Racing where he raced alongside Jason Plato. He claimed his first podium finish in the BTCC in the third race of the season at Brands Hatch, finishing third behind the Team Dynamics Hondas. He secured his first BTCC pole position at Snetterton, leading an MG 1–2 ahead of Plato. He finished the year in sixth place in the drivers' championship. Tordoff remained with Triple 8 for 2014, scoring another win at Donington Park, en route to seventh place in the final drivers' championship standings.

==== West Surrey Racing (2015–2016) ====
It was announced on 10 December 2014 that Tordoff had signed for the West Surrey Racing team for the 2015. He took his first win for the team at the Oulton Park round.

Tordoff continued with the team in 2016 and went on to take two race wins and a further seven podiums. After leading the championship for most of the second half of the year, he was pipped at the last race of the season by Gordon Shedden who took the crown by just two points.

Tordoff announced he was quitting the series on 23 November 2016, but stated he was open to a return in the future.

==== Motorbase Performance (2018–) ====
Tordoff announced he would return to the BTCC in 2018 on the 12 February, piloting an all new Ford Focus RS run by Motorbase Performance.

=== Porsche Carrera Cup Great Britain ===
In 2011, it was announced that he would be driving for Team Parker Racing in the Porsche Carrera Cup GB. He had a best result of third in the Porsche Carrera World Cup race at the Nürburgring and he won a set of tyres at Rockingham, courtesy of series sponsor Michelin. Tordoff finished the championship seventh in his first season.

Tordoff stayed at Team Parker Racing for 2012 where he would race alongside fellow Yorkshire racers Richard Plant and Daniel Lloyd. He took his first win in the series at Oulton Park having started from pole position and resisted race long pressure from championship leader Michael Meadows. He went on to win both races at Snetterton and won the season finale at Brands Hatch; he finished third in the championship, 46 points behind champion Meadows and 8 points behind second placed Ben Barker.

=== Porsche Supercup ===
Tordoff was one of seven drivers from the Porsche Carrera Cup GB to compete in the Silverstone round of the Porsche Supercup in 2011. He competed in the race once again in 2012, finishing 12th as best of the Great Britain championship entrants.

=== GT racing ===
Tordoff announced that he would be joining the British GT Championship in 2017, driving for Barwell Motorsport alongside fellow former BTCC driver Liam Griffin. In addition, in March 2017, Strakka Racing announced that Tordoff would race for them in the 2017 Blancpain GT Series Endurance Cup, sharing a McLaren 650 GT3 with David Fumanelli and Jonny Kane.

== Personal life ==
In September 2019, Tordoff's son died a few days after birth due to a kidney deformity. He subsequently pulled out of the BTCC round at Knockhill.

== Racing record ==
=== Complete British Touring Car Championship results ===
(key) (Races in bold indicate pole position – 1 point awarded in first race; races in italics indicate fastest lap – 1 point awarded all races; * signifies that driver lead race for at least one lap – 1 point awarded all races)

Year	Team	Car	1	2	3	4	5	6	7	8	9	10	11	12	13	14	15	16	17	18	19	20	21	22	23	24	25	26	27	28	29	30	DC	Pts
2010	Uniq Racing with Triple Eight	Vauxhall Vectra	THR; 1	THR; 2	THR; 3	ROC; 1	ROC; 2	ROC; 3	BRH; 1	BRH; 2	BRH; 3	OUL; 1	OUL; 2	OUL; 3	CRO; 1	CRO; 2	CRO; 3	SNE; 1	SNE; 2	SNE; 3	SIL; 1	SIL; 2	SIL; 3	KNO; 1	KNO; 2	KNO; 3	DON; 1	DON; 2	DON; 3	BRH; 1; 17	BRH; 2; 11	BRH; 3; 10	23rd	1
2013	MG KX Momentum Racing	MG 6 GT	BRH; 1; 4	BRH; 2; 5	BRH; 3; 3	DON; 1; 6	DON; 2; 6	DON; 3; 4	THR; 1; 4	THR; 2; 7	THR; 3; 8	OUL; 1; 2	OUL; 2; 21	OUL; 3; 7	CRO; 1; 7	CRO; 2; 21	CRO; 3; 7	**SNE**; **1**; 1*	**SNE**; **2**; 18	SNE; 3; 5	KNO; 1; 9	KNO; 2; 8	KNO; 3 Ret	ROC; 1; 16	ROC; 2; 5	ROC; 3; 6	SIL; 1; 2	SIL; 2; 4	SIL; 3; 14	BRH; 1; 3	BRH; 2; 2	BRH; 3; 12	6th	286
2014	MG KX Clubcard Fuel Save	MG 6 GT	BRH; 1; 10	BRH; 2; 10	BRH; 3; 12	DON; 1; 2	DON; 2; 1*	DON; 3; 14	THR; 1; 10	THR; 2; 11	THR; 3; 9	OUL; 1; 6	OUL; 2; 9	OUL; 3; 6	CRO; 1; 9	CRO; 2; 7	CRO; 3; 12	SNE; 1 NC	SNE; 2; 9	SNE; 3; 7	**KNO**; **1**; 24*	KNO; 2; 18	KNO; 3; 13	**ROC**; **1**; 2	ROC; 2; 3	ROC; 3; 8	SIL; 1; 4	SIL; 2; 6	SIL; 3 Ret	BRH; 1; 2	BRH; 2; 2	BRH; 3; 4	7th	255
2015	Team JCT600 with GardX	BMW 125i M Sport	BRH; 1; 15	BRH; 2; 7	BRH; 3; 4	DON; 1; 5	DON; 2; 9	DON; 3 Ret	THR; 1; 11	THR; 2; 6	THR; 3; 3	OUL; 1; 9	OUL; 2; 5	OUL; 3; 1*	**CRO**; **1**; 2*	**CRO**; **2**; 1*	CRO; 3; 6	SNE; 1; 11	SNE; 2; 5	SNE; 3; 4	KNO; 1; 4	KNO; 2 NC	KNO; 3 Ret	ROC; 1; 10	ROC; 2; 14	ROC; 3; 5	SIL; 1; 10	SIL; 2; 6	SIL; 3; 3	BRH; 1; 11	BRH; 2; 13	BRH; 3; 11	6th	270
2016	Team JCT600 with GardX	BMW 125i M Sport	BRH; 1; 16	BRH; 2; 9	**BRH**; **3**; 2*	DON; 1; 9	DON; 2; 8	**DON**; **3**; 3*	THR; 1; 7	THR; 2; 6	THR; 3; 8	OUL; 1; 2	OUL; 2; 1*	OUL; 3; 2	CRO; 1; 13	CRO; 2; 8	**CRO**; **3**; 2*	SNE; 1; 7	SNE; 2; 8	**SNE**; **3** DNS	KNO; 1; 5	KNO; 2; 2*	KNO; 3; 2	ROC; 1; 10	ROC; 2; 1*	ROC; 3; 16	SIL; 1; 11	SIL; 2; 11	SIL; 3; 6	BRH; 1; 10	BRH; 2; 5	BRH; 3; 5	2nd	306
2018	Team GardX Racing with Motorbase	Ford Focus RS	BRH; 1; 26	BRH; 2; 18	BRH; 3; 13	DON; 1 Ret	DON; 2; 11	DON; 3 Ret	THR; 1; 4	THR; 2; 4	THR; 3; 4	OUL; 1; 4	OUL; 2 Ret	OUL; 3 DNS	CRO; 1; 4	CRO; 2; 4	CRO; 3; 8	SNE; 1; 5	SNE; 2; 6	SNE; 3 Ret	ROC; 1 Ret	ROC; 2; 18	ROC; 3; 4	KNO; 1; 17	KNO; 2; 11	KNO; 3; 5	**SIL**; **1**; 1*	**SIL**; **2**; 3*	SIL; 3; 14	BRH; 1; 11	BRH; 2; 14	BRH; 3; 6	11th	202
2019	Cobra Sport AmD AutoAid RCIB Insurance	Honda Civic Type R (FK2)	BRH; 1 Ret	BRH; 2; 19	BRH; 3; 16	DON; 1; 13	DON; 2; 14	DON; 3; 15	**THR**; **1**; 2*	THR; 2; 6	THR; 3 Ret	CRO; 1; 23	CRO; 2; 15	CRO; 3; 13	OUL; 1; 5	OUL; 2; 5	OUL; 3; 3	SNE; 1; 3	SNE; 2; 5	SNE; 3; 6	**THR**; **1**; 1*	**THR**; **2**; 10*	THR; 3; 11	KNO; 1	KNO; 2	KNO; 3	SIL; 1	SIL; 2	SIL; 3	BRH; 1	BRH; 2	BRH; 3	13th	147

=== Complete European Le Mans Series results ===
Year	Entrant	Class	Chassis	Engine	1	2	3	4	5	Rank	Points
2015	JMW Motorsport	LMGTE	Ferrari 458 Italia GT2	Ferrari 4.5 L V8	SIL; 2	IMO; 6	RBR; 6	LEC	EST	10th	34

=== Complete British GT Championship results ===
(key) (Races in bold indicate pole position) (Races in italics indicate fastest lap)

Year	Team	Car	Class	1	2	3	4	5	6	7	8	9	10	DC	Points
2017	Barwell Motorsport with GardX	Lamborghini Huracán GT3	GT3	OUL; 1; 2	OUL; 2 Ret	ROC; 1; 5	SNE; 1; 2	SNE; 2; 2	SIL; 1; 6	SPA; 1; 8	SPA; 2 Ret	BRH; 1; 2	DON; 1; 4	5th	134
