= 2009 Renault Clio Cup United Kingdom =

The 2009 Elf Renault Clio Cup United Kingdom with Michelin season began at Brands Hatch on 4 April and finished after 20 races over 10 events at the same circuit on 4 October. The Championship was won by Phil Glew driving for Team Pyro.

== Changes for 2009 ==
- The Clio Cup 200 was introduced mid-way through the season.

== Teams & Drivers ==
All competitors raced in Renault Clio Cup 197s for the first half of the season and Renault Clio Cup 200s for the second half.

Team	No.	Drivers	Rounds
Team Pyro	1	(United Kingdom) Jeff Smith	All
Team Pyro	4	(United Kingdom) Phil Glew	All
Team Pyro	10	(Republic of Ireland) Árón Smith	All
Team Pyro	23	(United Kingdom) Daniel Lloyd	1–3
Team Pyro	24	(United Kingdom) Alex Dew	1–9
Team Pyro	24	(United Kingdom) Chris Rice	10
Team Pyro	40	(United Kingdom) Ben Winrow	6
JHR Developments	2	(United Kingdom) Tom Carnaby	All
JHR Developments	3	(United Kingdom) Andrew Herron	All
JHR Developments	5	(United Kingdom) Mark Hazell	1–4, 10
JHR Developments	5	(United Kingdom) Stefan Hodgetts	5
JHR Developments	11	(United Kingdom) Steven Hunter	2
Mardi Gras Motorsport	6	(United Kingdom) Stefan Hodgetts	6
Mardi Gras Motorsport	88	(Republic of Ireland) David Dickenson	All
PH Motorsport/Amery Motorsport	7	(United Kingdom) Phil House	5
Total Control Racing	8	(United Kingdom) Alex MacDowall	All
Total Control Racing	9	(United Kingdom) Jamie Ackers	1–2
Total Control Racing	22	(United Kingdom) Mike Robinson	All
Total Control Racing	23	(United Kingdom) Daniel Lloyd	4–10
Total Control Racing	44	(United Kingdom) Sam Tordoff	All
Coastal Racing	12	(United Kingdom) Carl Bradley	1–9
Coastal Racing	19	(United Kingdom) Ant Scragg	1–8
Coastal Racing	46	(United Kingdom) Robert Gaffney	1–4
Range Storage Ltd.	14	(United Kingdom) Lee Pattison	All
Stancombe Vehicle Engineering	15	(United Kingdom) Patrick Collins	All
Westbourne Motorsport/SVE	16	(United Kingdom) James Colburn	All
DTR	20	(United Kingdom) Stephen Tyldsley	1–8
Amery Motorsport	21	(United Kingdom) Darren Wilson	All
Amery Motorsport	32	(United Kingdom) David Shepherd	1–5
Amery Motorsport	38	(United Kingdom) Danny Buxton	9
Amery Motorsport	46	(United Kingdom) Robert Gaffney	5–8, 10
Amery Motorsport	50	(United Kingdom) Dave Newsham	All
APO Sport	29	(United Kingdom) Alex Osborne	1–4, 6–7
Elite Motorsport	47	(United Kingdom) Jake Packun	All

== Race calendar and results ==
The series supported the British Touring Car Championship at nine of the ten rounds. The series skipped the round at Knockhill and instead raced at the World Series by Renault meeting at Silverstone on 4–5 July.

Round		Venue	Date	Pole position	Fastest lap	Winning driver	Winning team
1	R1	Brands Hatch (Indy), Kent	4 April	(United Kingdom) Alex MacDowall	(United Kingdom) Alex MacDowall	(United Kingdom) Phil Glew	Team Pyro
1	R2	Brands Hatch (Indy), Kent	5 April	(United Kingdom) Alex MacDowall	(United Kingdom) Phil Glew	(United Kingdom) Phil Glew	Team Pyro
2	R3	Thruxton Circuit, Hampshire	25 April	(United Kingdom) Phil Glew	(United Kingdom) Phil Glew	(United Kingdom) Phil Glew	Team Pyro
2	R4	Thruxton Circuit, Hampshire	26 April	(United Kingdom) Phil Glew	(Republic of Ireland) Árón Smith	(United Kingdom) Phil Glew	Team Pyro
3	R5	Donington Park (National), Leicestershire	16 May	(United Kingdom) Phil Glew	(United Kingdom) Andrew Herron	(United Kingdom) Phil Glew	Team Pyro
3	R6	Donington Park (National), Leicestershire	17 May	(United Kingdom) Phil Glew	(United Kingdom) Andrew Herron	(Republic of Ireland) Árón Smith	Team Pyro
4	R7	Oulton Park (Island), Cheshire	30 May	(United Kingdom) Alex MacDowall	(United Kingdom) Phil Glew	(United Kingdom) Alex MacDowall	Total Control Racing
4	R8	Oulton Park (Island), Cheshire	31 May	(United Kingdom) Phil Glew	(United Kingdom) Phil Glew	(United Kingdom) Phil Glew	Team Pyro
5	R9	Croft Circuit, North Yorkshire	13 June	(United Kingdom) Alex MacDowall	(United Kingdom) Alex MacDowall	(United Kingdom) Alex MacDowall	Total Control Racing
5	R10	Croft Circuit, North Yorkshire	14 June	(United Kingdom) Alex MacDowall	(United Kingdom) Phil Glew	(United Kingdom) Phil Glew	Team Pyro
6	R11	Silverstone Circuit (GP), Northamptonshire	5 July	(United Kingdom) Phil Glew	(United Kingdom) Phil Glew	(United Kingdom) Stefan Hodgetts	Mardi Gras Motorsport
6	R12	Silverstone Circuit (GP), Northamptonshire	5 July	(United Kingdom) Alex MacDowall	(United Kingdom) Sam Tordoff	(United Kingdom) Stefan Hodgetts	Mardi Gras Motorsport
7	R13	Snetterton Motor Racing Circuit, Norfolk	1 August	(United Kingdom) Alex MacDowall	(United Kingdom) Sam Tordoff	(United Kingdom) Alex MacDowall	Total Control Racing
7	R14	Snetterton Motor Racing Circuit, Norfolk	2 August	(United Kingdom) Sam Tordoff	(United Kingdom) Alex MacDowall	(United Kingdom) Sam Tordoff	Total Control Racing
8	R15	Silverstone Circuit (National), Northamptonshire	29 August	(United Kingdom) Phil Glew	(United Kingdom) Mike Robinson	(United Kingdom) Dave Newsham	Amery Motorsport
8	R16	Silverstone Circuit (National), Northamptonshire	30 August	(United Kingdom) Tom Carnaby	(United Kingdom) Mike Robinson	(United Kingdom) Phil Glew	Team Pyro
9	R17	Rockingham Motor Speedway, Northamptonshire	20 September	(United Kingdom) Phil Glew	(United Kingdom) Danny Buxton	(United Kingdom) Phil Glew	Team Pyro
9	R18	Rockingham Motor Speedway, Northamptonshire	20 September	(United Kingdom) Phil Glew	(United Kingdom) Phil Glew	(United Kingdom) Phil Glew	Team Pyro
10	R19	Brands Hatch (GP), Kent	3 October	(United Kingdom) Phil Glew	(United Kingdom) Phil Glew	(United Kingdom) Alex MacDowall	Total Control Racing
10	R20	Brands Hatch (GP), Kent	4 October	(United Kingdom) Phil Glew	(United Kingdom) Phil Glew	(United Kingdom) Phil Glew	Team Pyro

== Standings ==
Points were awarded on a 32, 28, 25, 22, 20, 18, 16, 14, 12, 11, 10, 9, 8, 7, 6, 5, 4, 3, 2, 1 basis to the top 20 finishers in each race, with 2 bonus points for the fastest lap in each race. A driver's best 18 scores counted towards the championship.

=== Drivers' Championship ===
Pos	Driver	BHI		THR		DON		OUL		CRO		SIL		SNE		SIL		ROC		BHGP		Total	Drop	Pen	Pts
1	(United Kingdom) Phil Glew	1	1	1	1	1	10	2	1	2	1	2	6	3	2	2	1	1	1	2	1	592	29	2^{1}	561
2	(United Kingdom) Alex MacDowall	2	3	2	9	4	2	1	2	1	2	Ret	18	1	4	3	Ret	5	8	1	2	445			445
3	(United Kingdom) Andrew Herron	3	9	3	3	2	4	4	9	Ret	7	4	2	6	3	10	8	3	4	13	Ret	364		2^{2}	362
4	(Republic of Ireland) Árón Smith	5	2	5	2	6	1	Ret	5	18	9	7	12	5	9	Ret	4	4	Ret	5	4	326		2^{3}	324
5	(United Kingdom) Dave Newsham	9	5	4	4	Ret	Ret	3	4	7	5	Ret	3	14	6	1	2	Ret	Ret	DSQ	3	294			294
6	(United Kingdom) Mike Robinson	7	Ret	8	5	8	6	5	3	4	4	Ret	9	8	5	12	10	7	10	9	10	291		2^{4}	289
7	(United Kingdom) Lee Pattison	4	6	7	8	5	3	Ret	8	Ret	6	5	14	4	7	5	Ret	DSQ	7	7	5	284		10^{5}	274
8	(United Kingdom) Sam Tordoff	15	11	13	6	10	11	7	Ret	13	11	8	10	2	1	Ret	6	8	3	6	Ret	261			261
9	(United Kingdom) James Colburn	6	4	Ret	7	15	12	Ret	10	10	Ret	13	5	9	8	7	Ret	9	6	4	11	225		6^{6}	219
10	(United Kingdom) Carl Bradley	12	Ret	6	11	3	7	6	6	5	DSQ	9	11	7	Ret	Ret	5	6	9			222		4^{7}	218
11	(United Kingdom) Daniel Lloyd	14	7	9	10	13	17	8	7	6	14	6	7	Ret	11	6	9	Ret	5	Ret	7	223		8^{8}	215
12	(United Kingdom) Robert Gaffney	21	15	19	17	9	5	13	14	17	Ret	10	20	10	13	11	7			3	6	163		2^{9}	161
13	(United Kingdom) Stephen Tyldsley	16	Ret	14	22	16	8	10	16	8	8	3	4	17	12	Ret	14					142			142
14	(Republic of Ireland) David Dickenson	11	13	17	15	12	15	9	Ret	14	Ret	11	15	11	16	9	11	Ret	Ret	8	Ret	129			129
15	(United Kingdom) Tom Carnaby	Ret	Ret	15	16	Ret	Ret	14	Ret	19	16	12	21	12	10	4	3	10	Ret	12	9	133		6^{10}	127
16	(United Kingdom) Stefan Hodgetts									3	3	1	1									114			114
17	(United Kingdom) Alex Dew	10	12	Ret	14	7	9	11	11	11	10	15	13	Ret	Ret	Ret	12	Ret	Ret			119		6^{11}	113
18	(United Kingdom) Jeff Smith	18	10	11	Ret	Ret	Ret	12	13	16	Ret	Ret	Ret	13	15	Ret	16	Ret	Ret	11	8	89			89
19	(United Kingdom) Jake Packun	17	14	Ret	DNS	Ret	21	17	15	15	13	16	17	Ret	Ret	8	Ret	11	Ret	10	Ret	79			79
20	(United Kingdom) Ant Scragg	20	17	12	19	11	13	15	17	12	15	14	22	Ret	14	13	Ret					81		3^{12}	78
21	(United Kingdom) Darren Wilson	22	18	18	21	17	19	19	19	20	17	18	23	18	17	14	13	12	12	16	Ret	69			69
22	(United Kingdom) Danny Buxton																	2	2			58			58
23	(United Kingdom) Patrick Collins	Ret	19	Ret	20	Ret	14	18	18	21	Ret	19	19	15	Ret	15	15	Ret	11	14	Ret	55			55
24	(United Kingdom) Alex Osborne	13	8	Ret	12	14	20	Ret	DNS			17	16	16	DNS							53		2^{13}	51
25	(United Kingdom) David Shepherd	8	Ret	Ret	18	Ret	16	16	12	Ret	Ret											36		2^{14}	34
26	(United Kingdom) Phil House									9	12											21			21
27	(United Kingdom) Jamie Ackers	19	16	16	13																	20			20
28	(United Kingdom) Ben Winrow											Ret	8									14			14
29	(United Kingdom) Mark Hazell	Ret	20	Ret	DNS	Ret	18	Ret	DNS											Ret	12	13			13
30	(United Kingdom) Steven Hunter			10	Ret																	11			11
31	(United Kingdom) Chris Rice																			15	Ret	6			6
Pos	Driver	BRA		THR		DON		OUL		CRO		SIL		SNE		SIL		ROC		BRA		Total	Drop	Pen	Pts

Colour	Result
Gold	Winner
Silver	Second place
Bronze	Third place
Green	Points classification
Blue	Non-points classification
Blue	Non-classified finish (NC)
Purple	Retired, not classified (Ret)
Red	Did not qualify (DNQ)
Red	Did not pre-qualify (DNPQ)
Black	Disqualified (DSQ)
White	Did not start (DNS)
White	Withdrew (WD)
White	Race cancelled (C)
Blank	Did not practice (DNP)
Blank	Did not arrive (DNA)
Blank	Excluded (EX)

Notes:

1. – Phil Glew was docked two points at the second Brands Hatch meeting.
2. – Andrew Herron was docked two points at Croft.
3. – Árón Smith was docked two points at the second Brands Hatch meeting.
4. – Mike Robinson was docked two points at the first Brands Hatch meeting.
5. – Lee Pattison was docked two points at Croft and eight points at Rockingham.
6. – James Colburn was docked two points at Thruxton and four points at the first Silverstone meeting.
7. – Carl Bradley was docked four points at Croft.
8. – Daniel Lloyd was docked two points at Donington Park and six points at the second Silverstone meeting.
9. – Robert Gaffney was docked two points at Snetterton.
10. – Tom Carnaby was docked two points at the first Brands Hatch meeting and four points at the second Brands Hatch meeting.
11. – Alex Dew was docked two points at Thruxton and four points at Donington Park.
12. – Ant Scragg was docked three points at Croft.
13. – Alex Osborne was docked two points at the first Silverstone meeting.
14. – David Shepherd was docked two points at Donington Park.

=== Entrants' Championship ===
Points were awarded on the same scale as the drivers' championship but without the fastest lap bonus. An entrant's two highest placed cars in each race scored points and all scores counted towards the championship.

Pos	Entrant	BHI		THR		DON		OUL		CRO		SIL		SNE		SIL		ROC		BHGP		Pts
1	Team Pyro	1	1	1	1	1	1	2	1	2	1	2	6	3	2	2	1	1	1	2	1	921
1	Team Pyro	5	2	5	2	6	9	11	5	11	9	7	8	5	9	Ret	4	4	Ret	5	4	921
2	Total Control Racing	2	3	2	5	4	2	1	2	1	2	6	7	1	1	3	6	5	3	1	2	872
2	Total Control Racing	7	11	8	6	8	6	5	3	4	4	8	9	2	4	6	9	7	5	6	7	872
3	JHR Developments	3	9	3	3	2	4	4	9	3	3	4	2	6	3	4	3	3	4	12	9	556
3	JHR Developments	Ret	20	10	16	Ret	18	14	Ret	19	7	12	21	12	10	10	8	10	Ret	13	12	556
4	Amery Motorsport	8	5	4	4	17	16	3	4	7	5	10	3	10	6	1	2	2	2	3	3	530
4	Amery Motorsport	9	18	18	18	Ret	19	16	12	17	17	18	20	14	13	11	7	12	12	16	6	530
5	Coastal Racing	12	15	6	11	3	5	6	6	5	15	9	11	7	14	13	5	6	9			330
5	Coastal Racing	20	17	12	17	9	7	13	14	12	DSQ	14	22	Ret	Ret	Ret	Ret					330
6	Range Storage Ltd.	4	6	7	8	5	3	Ret	8	Ret	6	5	14	4	7	5	Ret	DSQ	7	7	5	284
7	Westbourne Motorsport/SVE	6	4	Ret	7	15	12	Ret	10	10	Ret	13	5	9	8	7	Ret	9	6	4	11	225
8	Mardi Gras Motorsport	11	13	17	15	12	15	9	Ret	14	Ret	1	1	11	16	9	11	Ret	Ret	8	Ret	193
8	Mardi Gras Motorsport											11	15									193
9	DTR	16	Ret	14	22	16	8	10	16	8	8	3	4	17	12	Ret	14					142
10	Elite Motorsport	17	14	Ret	DNS	Ret	21	17	15	15	13	16	17	Ret	Ret	8	Ret	11	Ret	10	Ret	79
11	Stancombe Vehicle Engineering	Ret	19	Ret	20	Ret	14	18	18	21	Ret	19	19	15	Ret	15	15	Ret	11	14	Ret	55
12	APO Sport	13	8	Ret	12	14	20	Ret	DNS			17	16	16	DNS							53
13	PH Motorsport/Amery Motorsport									9	12											21
Pos	Entrant	BHI		THR		DON		OUL		CRO		SIL		SNE		SIL		ROC		BHGP		Pts

== Winter Cup ==
The Winter Cup was held at Rockingham on 7 November. It was won by Daniel Lloyd driving for Total Control Racing.

=== Teams & Drivers ===
Team	No.	Drivers
Stancombe Vehicle Engineering	1	(United Kingdom) Matthew Munson
Stancombe Vehicle Engineering	22	(United Kingdom) Paul Plant
Team Pyro	2	(United Kingdom) Luke Caudle
Westbourne Motorsport	16	(United Kingdom) James Colburn
20Ten Racing Limited	21	(United Kingdom) Darren Wilson
Total Control Racing	23	(United Kingdom) Daniel Lloyd
Total Control Racing	44	(United Kingdom) Sam Tordoff

=== Calendar & Winners ===
Round		Venue	Date	Pole position	Fastest lap	Winning driver	Winning team
1	R1	Rockingham Motor Speedway, Northamptonshire	7 November	(United Kingdom) Sam Tordoff	(United Kingdom) James Colburn	(United Kingdom) James Colburn	Westbourne Motorsport
1	R2	Rockingham Motor Speedway, Northamptonshire	7 November	(United Kingdom) Sam Tordoff	(United Kingdom) Daniel Lloyd	(United Kingdom) Sam Tordoff	Total Control Racing

=== Drivers' Championship ===
Points were awarded on the same scale as the main championship.

Pos	Driver	ROC		Total	Pen	Pts
1	(United Kingdom) Daniel Lloyd	2	2	58		58
2	(United Kingdom) Sam Tordoff	3	1	57		57
3	(United Kingdom) James Colburn	1	3	59	2^{1}	57
4	(United Kingdom) Darren Wilson	4	5	42		42
5	(United Kingdom) Matthew Munson	5	7	36		36
6	(United Kingdom) Luke Caudle	6	6	36		36
7	(United Kingdom) Paul Plant	Ret	4	22		22
Pos	Driver	ROC		Total	Pen	Pts

Notes:

1. – James Colburn was docked two points in the first race.
