= 2012 FIA WTCC Race of Japan =

2012 Race of Japan
Race details
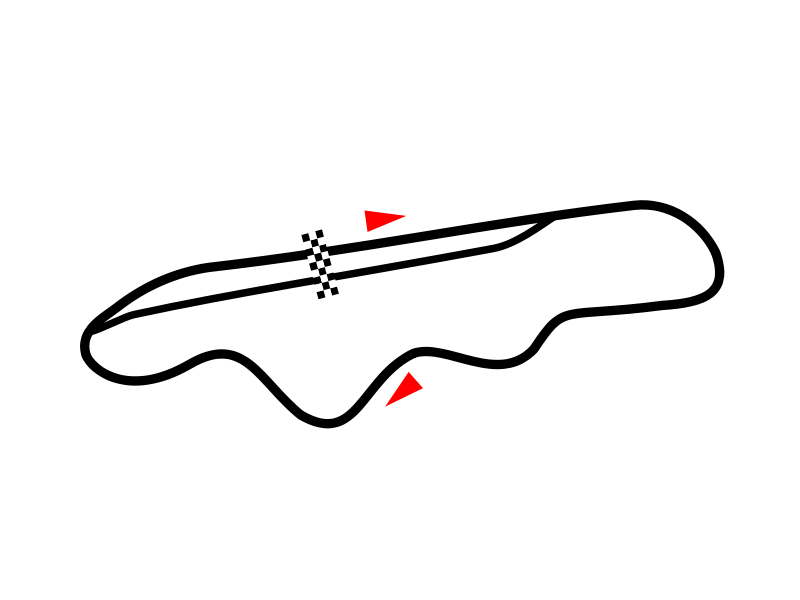
- Round 10 of 12 in the 2012 World Touring Car Championship at Suzuka Circuit (East Circuit) in Suzuka City, Japan.
- Date: 21 October, 2012
- Location: Suzuka City, Japan
- Course: Suzuka Circuit (East Circuit); 2.243 kilometres (1.394 mi)

Race One
- Laps: 26
Pole position
Driver		(Switzerland) Alain Menu	Chevrolet
Time		52.885	
Podium
First		(Switzerland) Alain Menu	Chevrolet
Second		(France) Yvan Muller	Chevrolet
Third		(United Kingdom) Robert Huff	Chevrolet
Fastest Lap
Driver		(Switzerland) Alain Menu	Chevrolet
Time		53.885	

Race Two
- Laps: 26
Podium
First		(Italy) Stefano D'Aste	Wiechers-Sport
Second		(Spain) Pepe Oriola	Tuenti Racing
Third		(Italy) Gabriele Tarquini	Lukoil Racing Team
Fastest Lap
Driver		(Spain) Pepe Oriola	Tuenti Racing
Time		54.239	

The 2012 FIA WTCC Race of Japan was the tenth round of the 2012 World Touring Car Championship season and the fifth running of the FIA WTCC Race of Japan. It was held on 21 October 2012 at the Suzuka Circuit in Suzuka City, Japan. The first race was won by Alain Menu for Chevrolet and the second race was won by Stefano D'Aste for Wiechers-Sport.

== Background ==
After the previous round in the United States at Sonoma Raceway, the championship was being led jointly by Yvan Muller and Robert Huff on 315 points. Norbert Michelisz was leading the Yokohama Independents' Trophy. Chevrolet had the opportunity to secure the manufacturers championship.

There were a number of driver changes prior to the event, Darryl O'Young left Special Tuning Racing and later returned to bamboo-engineering. His replacement at STR was German racing driver and former FIA GT1 World Championship team owner René Münnich. Masaki Kano joined Liqui Moly Team Engstler for his home event, driving a naturally aspirated BMW 320si. Fellow Japanese racer Hiroki Yoshimoto joined Tuenti Racing Team for the event, driving the SUNRED SR León 1.6T raced up until the last event by Tiago Monteiro.

Monteiro switched to Honda Racing Team JAS for the final three rounds of the championship to debut the works Honda Civic S2000 TC in order to develop the car in preparation for a full programme in 2013.

== Report ==
=== Free Practice ===
Muller set the pace in the Friday test session which was interrupted by a trio of red flags, leading a Chevrolet 1–2–3 with Pepe Oriola the leading SEAT in fourth.

Chevrolet continued to set the pace on Saturday in FP1, this time courtesy of Alain Menu at the head of another Chevrolet 1–2–3. Monteiro set the fourth fastest time in his new Honda Civic and Oriola was the quickest independent driver. Local driver Yoshimoto was seventh.

Menu topped the times once again in FP2, although surprisingly the Chevrolet 1–2–3 from earlier on was not repeated as Fernando Monje set the third fastest time in his Tuenti Racing Team SEAT León.

=== Qualifying ===
After setting the pace throughout free practice, Menu went on to take pole position ahead of Muller and Huff while Chevrolet wrapped up the manufacturers title. Much of the attention was on the Honda of Monteiro, who at one point looked likely to drop out in Q1 until a last minute quick lap got him through to the second session. He finished Q2 eleventh behind Stefano D'Aste who would take his third reversed grid pole position of the year in race two. Independents' Trophy leader Michelisz could only manage fourteenth, five places behind trophy rival Oriola. The Team Aon duo of James Nash and Tom Chilton qualified in 19th and 21st respectively but would both start the first race at the back of the grid due to them both requiring a new engine for the event.

=== Warm-Up ===
Race two pole sitter D'Aste was the quickest driver in Sunday mornings warm up session, Michelisz was a close second. An engine change for Masaki Kano overnight would send him to the back of the race one grid.

=== Race One ===
Menu led from start to finish leading a comfortable Chevrolet 1–2–3 in the opening Suzuka race. The lack of action near the front was representative of much of field, although Gabriele Tarquini jumped up from sixth to fourth at the start to lead home independent race winner Alex MacDowall. Having overtaken James Nash, Alberto Cerqui then quickly ended his race in the gravel at turn one. Mehdi Bennani collided with Aleksei Dudukalo while attempting a pass, Dudukalo held the car and continued while Bennani was forced to pit. Monteiro finished tenth to score a point in the debut race for the Honda Civic. After the race, Dudukalo received a 30-second penalty for colliding with Bennani and he dropped to 18th in the classification, while Nash and Cerqui both received 30-second penalties for start infringements dropping Nash to 19th.

=== Race Two ===
D'Aste started on pole position for the reverse grid race, he established a comfortable lead over second placed Oriola to take his second win of the season. Tarquini had jumped up to third place to complete the podium. Behind them, the Chevrolet trio found passing difficult and the Proteam Racing BMW of Bennani held them back for much of the race. Huff and Menu passed on the penultimate lap, while Muller passed Bennani on the final lap. Independent trophy contender Michelisz spun out of the race on the first lap, allowing trophy rival Oriola to close the points gap to 12. The overall championship was once again a tie between Huff and Muller.

== Results ==
=== Qualifying ===
Pos.	No.	Name	Team	Car	C	Q1	Q2	Points
1	8	(Switzerland) Alain Menu	Chevrolet	Chevrolet Cruze 1.6T		52.984	52.885	**5**
2	1	(France) Yvan Muller	Chevrolet	Chevrolet Cruze 1.6T		52.940	52.950	**4**
3	2	(United Kingdom) Robert Huff	Chevrolet	Chevrolet Cruze 1.6T		53.077	53.054	**3**
4	11	(United Kingdom) Alex MacDowall	bamboo-engineering	Chevrolet Cruze 1.6T	Y	53.357	53.206	**2**
5	25	(Morocco) Mehdi Bennani	Proteam Racing	BMW 320 TC	Y	53.652	53.224	**1**
6	3	(Italy) Gabriele Tarquini	Lukoil Racing	SEAT León WTCC		53.488	53.259	
7	15	(Netherlands) Tom Coronel	ROAL Motorsport	BMW 320 TC		53.420	53.400	
8	4	(Russia) Aleksei Dudukalo	Lukoil Racing	SEAT León WTCC	Y	53.431	53.513	
9	74	(Spain) Pepe Oriola	Tuenti Racing	SEAT León WTCC	Y	53.740	53.516	
10	26	(Italy) **Stefano D'Aste**	Wiechers-Sport	BMW 320 TC	Y	53.696	53.729	
11	18	(Portugal) Tiago Monteiro	Honda Racing Team JAS	Honda Civic S2000 TC		53.443	53.886	
12	20	(China) Darryl O'Young	bamboo-engineering	Chevrolet Cruze 1.6T	Y	53.608	54.491	
13	6	(Germany) Franz Engstler	Liqui Moly Team Engstler	BMW 320 TC	Y	53.742		
14	5	(Hungary) Norbert Michelisz	Zengő Motorsport	BMW 320 TC	Y	53.746		
15	22	(United Kingdom) Tom Boardman	Special Tuning Racing	SEAT León WTCC	Y	53.847		
16	88	(Spain) Fernando Monje	Tuenti Racing	SEAT León WTCC	Y	53.978		
17	80	(Japan) Hiroki Yoshimoto	Tuenti Racing	SR León 1.6T	Y	54.002		
18	7	(Hong Kong) Charles Ng	Liqui Moly Team Engstler	BMW 320 TC	Y	54.030		
19	14	(United Kingdom) James Nash	Team Aon	Ford Focus S2000 TC		54.082		
20	16	(Italy) Alberto Cerqui	ROAL Motorsport	BMW 320 TC	Y	54.100		
21	23	(United Kingdom) Tom Chilton	Team Aon	Ford Focus S2000 TC		54.330		
22	38	(Germany) René Münnich	Special Tuning Racing	SEAT León WTCC	Y	54.690		
23	75	(Japan) Masaki Kano	Liqui Moly Team Engstler	BMW 320si	Y	55.013		

- **Bold** denotes Pole position for second race.

=== Race 1 ===
Pos.	No.	Name	Team	Car	C	Laps	Time/Retired	Grid	Points
1	8	(Switzerland) **Alain Menu**	Chevrolet	Chevrolet Cruze 1.6T		26	23:44.880	1	25
2	1	(France) Yvan Muller	Chevrolet	Chevrolet Cruze 1.6T		26	+0.812	2	18
3	2	(United Kingdom) Robert Huff	Chevrolet	Chevrolet Cruze 1.6T		26	+1.419	3	15
4	3	(Italy) Gabriele Tarquini	Lukoil Racing	SEAT León WTCC		26	+13.828	6	12
5	11	(United Kingdom) Alex MacDowall	bamboo-engineering	Chevrolet Cruze 1.6T	Y	26	+14.273	4	10
6	15	(Netherlands) Tom Coronel	ROAL Motorsport	BMW 320 TC		26	+19.870	7	8
7	74	(Spain) Pepe Oriola	Tuenti Racing	SEAT León WTCC	Y	26	+20.415	9	6
8	26	(Italy) Stefano D'Aste	Wiechers-Sport	BMW 320 TC	Y	26	+20.677	10	4
9	18	(Portugal) Tiago Monteiro	Honda Racing Team JAS	Honda Civic S2000 TC		26	+21.284	11	2
10	6	(Germany) Franz Engstler	Liqui Moly Team Engstler	BMW 320 TC	Y	26	+21.490	13	1
11	20	(China) Darryl O'Young	bamboo-engineering	Chevrolet Cruze 1.6T	Y	26	+23.724	12	
12	22	(United Kingdom) Tom Boardman	Special Tuning Racing	SEAT León WTCC	Y	26	+32.605	15	
13	5	(Hungary) Norbert Michelisz	Zengő Motorsport	BMW 320 TC	Y	26	+32.767	14	
14	88	(Spain) Fernando Monje	Tuenti Racing	SEAT León WTCC	Y	26	+34.151	16	
15	23	(United Kingdom) Tom Chilton	Team Aon	Ford Focus S2000 TC		26	+34.615	22	
16	80	(Japan) Hiroki Yoshimoto	Tuenti Racing	SR León 1.6T	Y	26	+40.965	17	
17	38	(Germany) René Münnich	Special Tuning Racing	SEAT León WTCC	Y	26	+48.733	20	
18	4	(Russia) Aleksei Dudukalo	Lukoil Racing	SEAT León WTCC	Y	26	+49.644	8	
19	14	(United Kingdom) James Nash	Team Aon	Ford Focus S2000 TC		26	+1:03.894	21	
20	75	(Japan) Masaki Kano	Liqui Moly Team Engstler	BMW 320si	Y	25	+1 Lap	23	
21	25	(Morocco) Mehdi Bennani	Proteam Racing	BMW 320 TC	Y	25	+1 Lap	5	
22	7	(Hong Kong) Charles Ng	Liqui Moly Team Engstler	BMW 320 TC	Y	23	+3 Laps	18	
Ret	16	(Italy) Alberto Cerqui	ROAL Motorsport	BMW 320 TC	Y	14	Race incident	19	

- **Bold** denotes Fastest lap.

=== Race 2 ===
Pos.	No.	Name	Team	Car	C	Laps	Time/Retired	Grid	Points
1	26	(Italy) Stefano D'Aste	Wiechers-Sport	BMW 320 TC	Y	26	23:54.717	1	25
2	74	(Spain) **Pepe Oriola**	Tuenti Racing	SEAT León WTCC	Y	26	+2.562	2	18
3	3	(Italy) Gabriele Tarquini	Lukoil Racing	SEAT León WTCC		26	+2.845	5	15
4	2	(United Kingdom) Robert Huff	Chevrolet	Chevrolet Cruze 1.6T		26	+3.774	8	12
5	8	(Switzerland) Alain Menu	Chevrolet	Chevrolet Cruze 1.6T		26	+4.220	10	10
6	1	(France) Yvan Muller	Chevrolet	Chevrolet Cruze 1.6T		26	+4.568	9	8
7	25	(Morocco) Mehdi Bennani	Proteam Racing	BMW 320 TC	Y	26	+4.879	6	6
8	4	(Russia) Aleksei Dudukalo	Lukoil Racing	SEAT León WTCC	Y	26	+7.174	3	4
9	11	(United Kingdom) Alex MacDowall	bamboo-engineering	Chevrolet Cruze 1.6T	Y	26	+7.707	7	2
10	18	(Portugal) Tiago Monteiro	Honda Racing Team JAS	Honda Civic S2000 TC		26	+10.583	11	1
11	6	(Germany) Franz Engstler	Liqui Moly Team Engstler	BMW 320 TC	Y	26	+11.997	13	
12	22	(United Kingdom) Tom Boardman	Special Tuning Racing	SEAT León WTCC	Y	26	+18.156	15	
13	20	(China) Darryl O'Young	bamboo-engineering	Chevrolet Cruze 1.6T	Y	26	+18.945	12	
14	16	(Italy) Alberto Cerqui	ROAL Motorsport	BMW 320 TC	Y	26	+19.154	20	
15	15	(Netherlands) Tom Coronel	ROAL Motorsport	BMW 320 TC		26	+19.492	4	
16	14	(United Kingdom) James Nash	Team Aon	Ford Focus S2000 TC		26	+25.856	19	
17	7	(Hong Kong) Charles Ng	Liqui Moly Team Engstler	BMW 320 TC	Y	26	+25.857	18	
18	23	(United Kingdom) Tom Chilton	Team Aon	Ford Focus S2000 TC		26	+26.142	21	
19	80	(Japan) Hiroki Yoshimoto	Tuenti Racing	SR León 1.6T	Y	26	+34.762	17	
20	38	(Germany) René Münnich	Special Tuning Racing	SEAT León WTCC	Y	26	+35.074	22	
21	75	(Japan) Masaki Kano	Liqui Moly Team Engstler	BMW 320si	Y	26	+40.576	23	
Ret	88	(Spain) Fernando Monje	Tuenti Racing	SEAT León WTCC	Y	18	Mechanical	16	
Ret	5	(Hungary) Norbert Michelisz	Zengő Motorsport	BMW 320 TC	Y	0	Race incident	14	

- **Bold** denotes Fastest lap.

== Standings after the race ==
Drivers' Championship standings

Pos	Driver	Points
1	(France) Yvan Muller	345
2	(United Kingdom) Robert Huff	345
3	(Switzerland) Alain Menu	307
4	(Italy) Gabriele Tarquini	220
5	(Netherlands) Tom Coronel	172

Yokohama Independents' Trophy standings

Pos	Driver	Points
1	(Hungary) Norbert Michelisz	136
2	(Spain) Pepe Oriola	126
3	(Italy) Stefano D'Aste	101
4	(United Kingdom) Alex MacDowall	95
5	(Germany) Franz Engstler	76

Manufacturers' Championship standings

Pos	Manufacturer	Points
1	(United States) Chevrolet	835
2	(Germany) BMW Customer Racing Teams	543
3	(Spain) SEAT Racing Technology	532

- Note: Only the top five positions are included for both sets of drivers' standings.
