= Alex MacDowall =

British racing driver (born 1991)

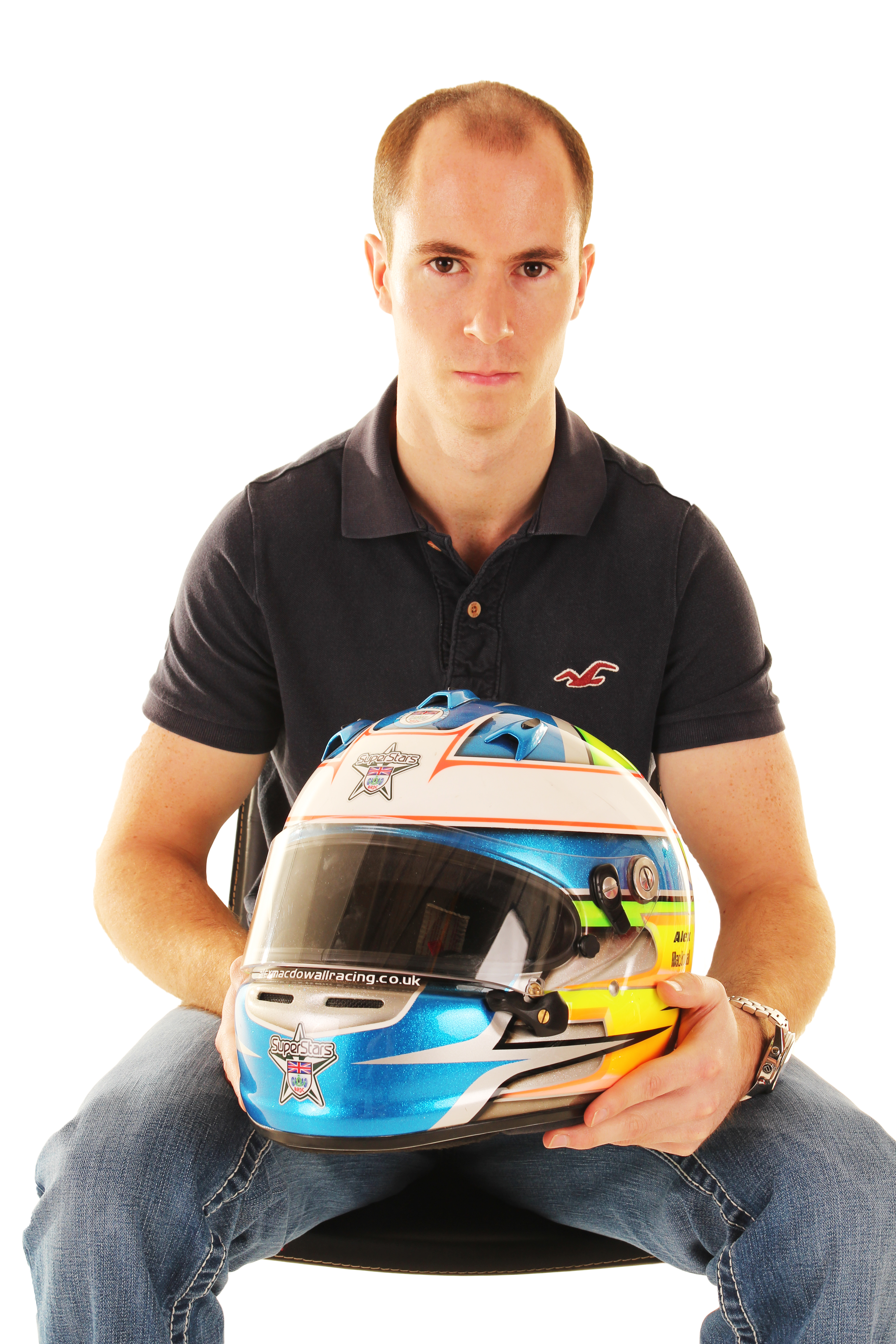
- Alex MacDowall Racing Driver in 2014
- Nationality: (United Kingdom) British
- Born: 22 January 1991 (age 35) Carlisle, England

FIA World Endurance Championship career
- Debut season: 2014
- Current team: Aston Martin Racing
- Categorisation: FIA Silver (until 2016, 2018–); FIA Gold (2017)
- Car number: 99
- Starts: 15
- Wins: 1
- Poles: 4
- Fastest laps: 1
- Best finish: 7th in 2015

Previous series
- 2013 2010–2011 2009 2007–2009 2007 2005–2006: World Touring Car Championship; Ginetta GT Supercup; British Touring Car Championship; Spanish SEAT Supercopa; Renault Clio Cup UK; SEAT Cupra Championship; T Cars

Alexander Hay MacDowall (born 22 January 1991) is a British racing driver. He competed in the 2014 FIA World Endurance Championship season for Aston Martin Racing.

== Racing career ==
=== Early career ===
MacDowall was born in Carlisle. He began his racing career in T Cars in 2005, and remained there for 2006. In 2007, he stepped up to the Renault Clio Cup with Total Control Racing, finishing 32nd overall. He then finished third in the end of year Winter series. In 2008, he improved in the main series to finish seventh overall, and finished third once again in the Winter series. In 2009, he took four victories and finished as runner-up to Phil Glew.

=== British Touring Car Championship ===
==== Silverline Chevrolet (2010–2011) ====
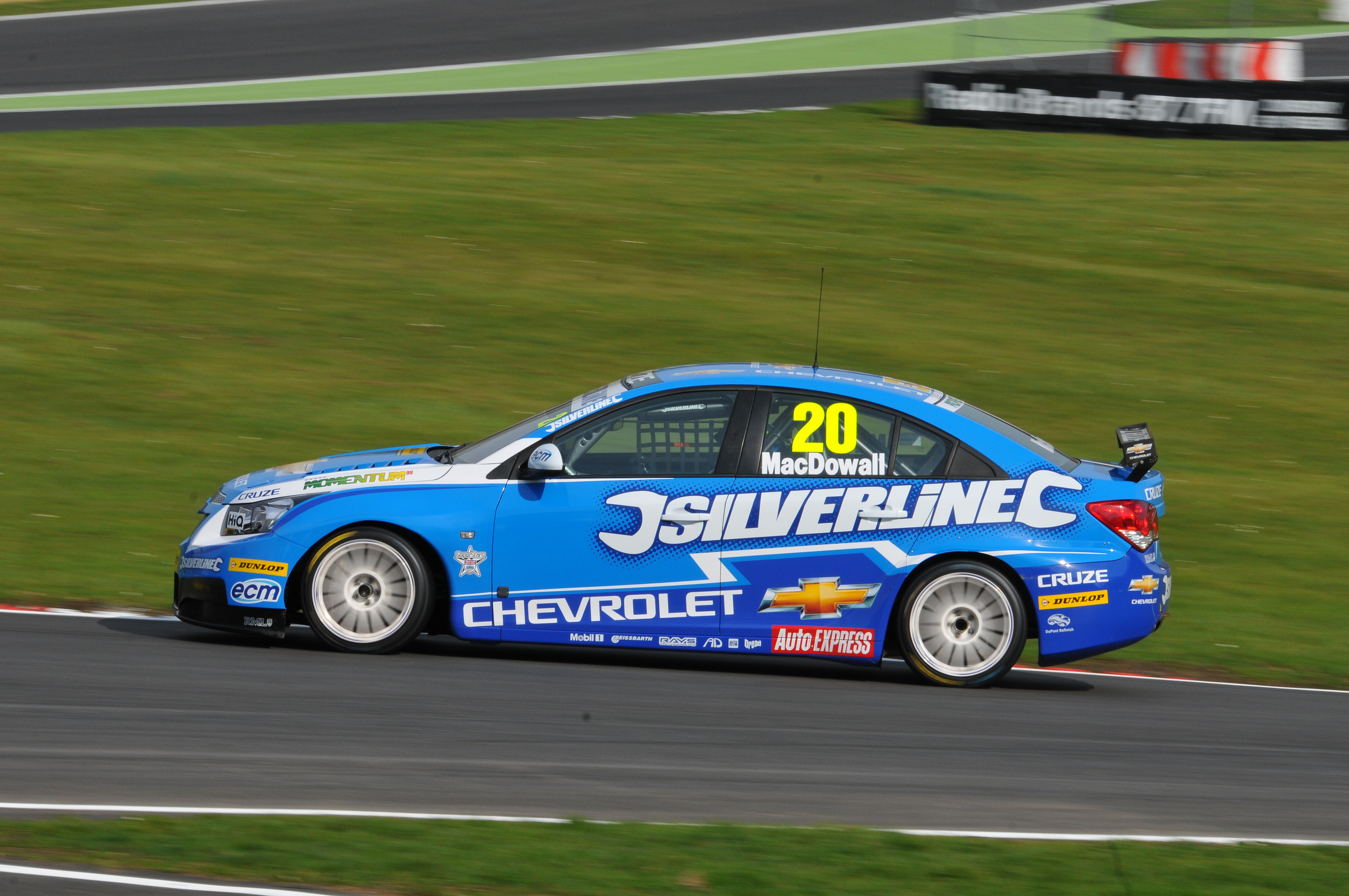
MacDowall competing at Brands Hatch during the 2011 British Touring Car Championship season.

MacDowall's 2009 Clio Cup performances impressed top British Touring Car Championship (BTCC) teams Motorbase Performance, RML and West Surrey Racing, who gave him tests over the winter break ahead of the 2010 season. In March 2010, it was announced that MacDowall would race a Chevrolet Cruze for the RML-run Silverline Chevrolet factory-supported team, as teammate to Jason Plato. In a wet qualifying session at Snetterton he became the youngest polesitter in the championship's history but the car's gear lever broke as he changed up into second gear at the start of the first race. He failed to finish in the points in either of the other two races. His rookie year was a success though, with two podiums, two pole positions and a fastest lap en route to 11th overall in the championship. Macdowall continued with Chevrolet in the British Touring Car Championship for 2011, ending the season ninth in the standings with 100 points and three podium finishes.

=== World Touring Car Championship ===
==== bamboo-engineering (2012–2013) ====
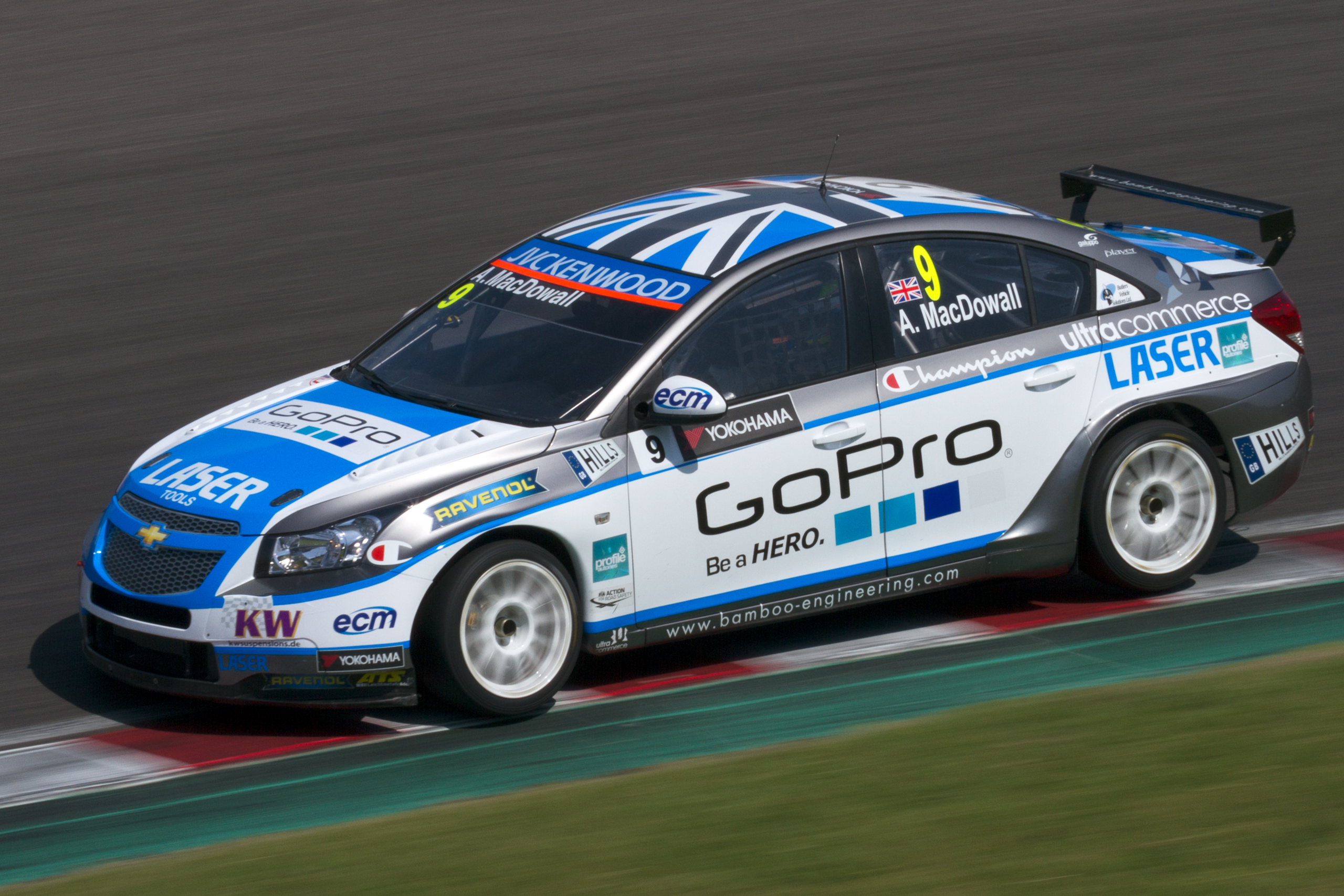
MacDowall competing in the 2013 World Touring Car Championship.

In February 2012, it was announced that MacDowall would race for bamboo-engineering in the WTCC for the 2012 season where his teammate would be Pasquale Di Sabatino. He scored points in his first race at Monza and again in the second race of the day. He left Italy in a three-way tie for the Yokohama Drivers' Trophy championship lead. He took his first win in the Yokohama Independents' Trophy at the Race of Austria. Di Sabatino was replaced by Michel Nykjær for the Race of Brazil and MacDowall missed out on an independent win to Nykjær in race one. His result in race one combined with two non-scores for Yokohama Trophy rival Franz Engstler elevated him to fourth in the standings, 12 points behind Stefano D'Aste. He took his second independent win of the season in race one of the Race of Japan. He went into the final race weekend in Macau with a slim chance of taking the Yokohama Trophy title. In qualifying, he secured the reversed grid pole position for race two; at the start of the race he lost the lead to Norbert Michelisz but passed him again to take the lead. Both drivers were then overtaken by Alain Menu and MacDowall dropped to fourth when a tap from Yvan Muller spun MacDowall into the barriers after exiting the high speed Mandarin corner. Muller later apologised for the incident but no penalties were issued to either driver. MacDowall dropped back down to fifth in the Yokohama Trophy standings and was classified in tenth in the drivers' championship, tied on points with Mehdi Bennani but behind on countback due to Bennani's podium at the Race of Hungary.

MacDowall stayed with Bamboo Engineering for the 2013 season, partnering new teammate James Nash. He finished on the overall podium for the first time in the WTCC when he came third in race one of the Race of Italy, also taking the independents' victory.

=== World Endurance Championship ===
==== Aston Martin Racing (2014–2015) ====
In February 2014, MacDowall announced that he would compete for Aston Martin Racing, the factory Aston Martin racing team, in the FIA World Endurance Championship. This marked MacDowall's first competitive start in GT racing and saw him race at some of the world's most famous circuits including Le Mans, Spa, Silverstone and Interlagos. MacDowall competed in the GTE Pro category alongside former Bamboo teammate Darryl O'Young and experienced GT racer Fernando Rees.

== Racing record ==
=== Complete British Touring Car Championship results ===
(key) (Races in bold indicate pole position – 1 point awarded in first race) (Races in italics indicate fastest lap – 1 point awarded all races) (* signifies that driver lead race for at least one lap – 1 point given)

Year	Team	Car	1	2	3	4	5	6	7	8	9	10	11	12	13	14	15	16	17	18	19	20	21	22	23	24	25	26	27	28	29	30	DC	Pts
2010	Silverline Chevrolet	Chevrolet Cruze	THR; 1; 7	THR; 2; 6	THR; 3; 9	ROC; 1; 12	ROC; 2; 12	ROC; 3 Ret	BRH; 1; 7	BRH; 2; 3	BRH; 3 Ret	OUL; 1; 7	OUL; 2; 9	**OUL**; **3** Ret*	CRO; 1; 13	CRO; 2; 9	CRO; 3; 10	**SNE**; **1** NC	SNE; 2 Ret	SNE; 3; 13	SIL; 1; 4	SIL; 2; 9	SIL; 3; 10	**KNO**; **1**; 2	KNO; 2; 9	KNO; 3; 7	DON; 1; 4	DON; 2; 11	DON; 3 Ret	BRH; 1; 4	BRH; 2 Ret	BRH; 3; 11	11th	83
2011	Silverline Chevrolet	Chevrolet Cruze LT	BRH; 1; 5	BRH; 2; 13	BRH; 3; 16	DON; 1; 9	DON; 2; 9	**DON**; **3**; 4*	THR; 1; 10	THR; 2; 7	THR; 3; 8	OUL; 1; 3	OUL; 2; 5	OUL; 3; 18	CRO; 1; 14	CRO; 2 Ret	CRO; 3; 8	SNE; 1; 2	SNE; 2; 4	SNE; 3; 5	KNO; 1; 12	KNO; 2 Ret	KNO; 3; 10	ROC; 1; 12	ROC; 2; 15	ROC; 3; 11	BRH; 1; 3	BRH; 2 Ret	BRH; 3 Ret	SIL; 1; 5	SIL; 2; 9	**SIL**; **3**; 4	9th	100

=== Complete World Touring Car Championship results ===
(key) (Races in bold indicate pole position) (Races in italics indicate fastest lap)

Year	Team	Car	1	2	3	4	5	6	7	8	9	10	11	12	13	14	15	16	17	18	19	20	21	22	23	24	Pos	Pts
2012	bamboo-engineering	Chevrolet Cruze 1.6T	ITA; 1; 8	ITA; 2; 7	ESP; 1; 15	ESP; 2; 14	MAR; 1; 12	MAR; 2 Ret	SVK; 1; 12	SVK; 2 Ret	HUN; 1; 9	HUN; 2; 11	AUT; 1; 6	AUT; 2 Ret	POR; 1; 10	POR; 2; 7	BRA; 1; 6	BRA; 2; 11	USA; 1; 5	USA; 2; 7	JPN; 1; 5	JPN; 2; 9	CHN; 1 NC	CHN; 2; 17	MAC; 1; 9	**MAC**; **2** Ret	11th	68
2013	bamboo-engineering	Chevrolet Cruze 1.6T	ITA; 1; 3	ITA; 2; 20†	MAR; 1; 6	MAR; 2 Ret	SVK; 1; 8	SVK; 2; 8	HUN; 1; 8	**HUN**; **2**; 3	AUT; 1; 5	AUT; 2; 6	RUS; 1; 13	RUS; 2; 11	POR; 1; 13	POR; 2; 17	ARG; 1; 11	ARG; 2; 11	USA; 1; 4	USA; 2; 13	JPN; 1; 2	JPN; 2; 12	CHN; 1; 4	CHN; 2; 13	MAC; 1; 5	MAC; 2; 5	11th	141

† – Did not finish the race, but was classified as he completed over 90% of the race distance.

=== Complete FIA World Endurance Championship results ===
(key) (Races in bold indicate pole position; races in italics indicate fastest lap)

Year	Entrant	Class	Car	Engine	1	2	3	4	5	6	7	8	Rank	Points
2014	Aston Martin Racing	LMGTE Pro	Aston Martin Vantage GTE	Aston Martin 4.5 L V8	SIL; 7	SPA; 5	LMS; WD	COA; 10	**FUJ**; 3	SHA; 4	BHR; 12	SÃO; 5	12th	55.5
2015	Aston Martin Racing V8	LMGTE Pro	Aston Martin Vantage GTE	Aston Martin 4.5 L V8	SIL; 6	**SPA**; 1	**LMS**; 9	NÜR; 5	**COA**; 4	FUJ; 7	SHA; 5	BHR; 7	7th	84

=== Complete British GT Championship results ===
(key) (Races in bold indicate pole position) (Races in italics indicate fastest lap)

Year	Team	Car	Class	1	2	3	4	5	6	7	8	9	10	DC	Points
2014	PGF Kinfaun-AMR	Aston Martin V12 Vantage GT3	GT3	OUL; 1	OUL; 2	ROC; 1	SIL; 1	SNE; 1	SNE; 2	SPA; 1	SPA; 2	BRH; 1; 6	DON; 1; 6	25th	24
2015	Oman Racing Team	Aston Martin V12 Vantage GT3	GT3	OUL; 1	OUL; 2	ROC; 1	SIL; 1	SPA; 1	BRH; 1	SNE; 1; 9	SNE; 2; 7	DON; 1; 9		21st	11

=== 24 Hours of Le Mans results ===
Year	Team	Co-Drivers	Car	Class	Laps	Pos.	Class Pos.
2015	(United Kingdom) Aston Martin Racing V8	(Brazil) Fernando Rees (New Zealand) Richie Stanaway	Aston Martin Vantage GTE	GTE; Pro	320	34th	6th

=== Complete European Le Mans Series results ===
Year	Entrant	Class	Chassis	Engine	1	2	3	4	5	6	Rank	Points
2015	Aston Martin Racing	LMGTE	Aston Martin Vantage GTE	Aston Martin 4.5 L V8	SIL	IMO	RBR	LEC	EST; 2		13th	18
2016	Aston Martin Racing	LMGTE	Aston Martin Vantage GTE	Aston Martin 4.5 L V8	SIL; 1	IMO; 5	RBR; 4	**LEC**; 3	SPA; 5	EST; 1	1st	98
2018	JMW Motorsport	LMGTE	Ferrari 488 GTE	Ferrari F154CB 3.9 L Turbo V8	LEC; 1	MNZ; 4	**RBR**; Ret	SIL; 1	SPA; 4‡	**ALG**; 2	2nd	88

^{‡} Half points awarded as less than 75% of race distance was completed.

Sporting positions
Preceded by Mikkel Mac; Johnny Laursen; Andrea Rizzoli	European Le Mans Series; LMGTE Champion; 2016; With: Darren Turner & Andrew Howard	Succeeded by Jody Fannin; Robert Smith
Preceded by Nico Bastian; Timur Boguslavskiy; Felipe Fraga (Blancpain GT Series Endurance Cup)	GT World Challenge Europe Endurance Cup; Silver Cup Champion; 2020; With: Patrick Kujala & Frederik Schandorff	Succeeded by Alex Fontana; Ricardo Feller; Rolf Ineichen
