= 2016 British Touring Car Championship =

59th season of the British Touring Car Championship

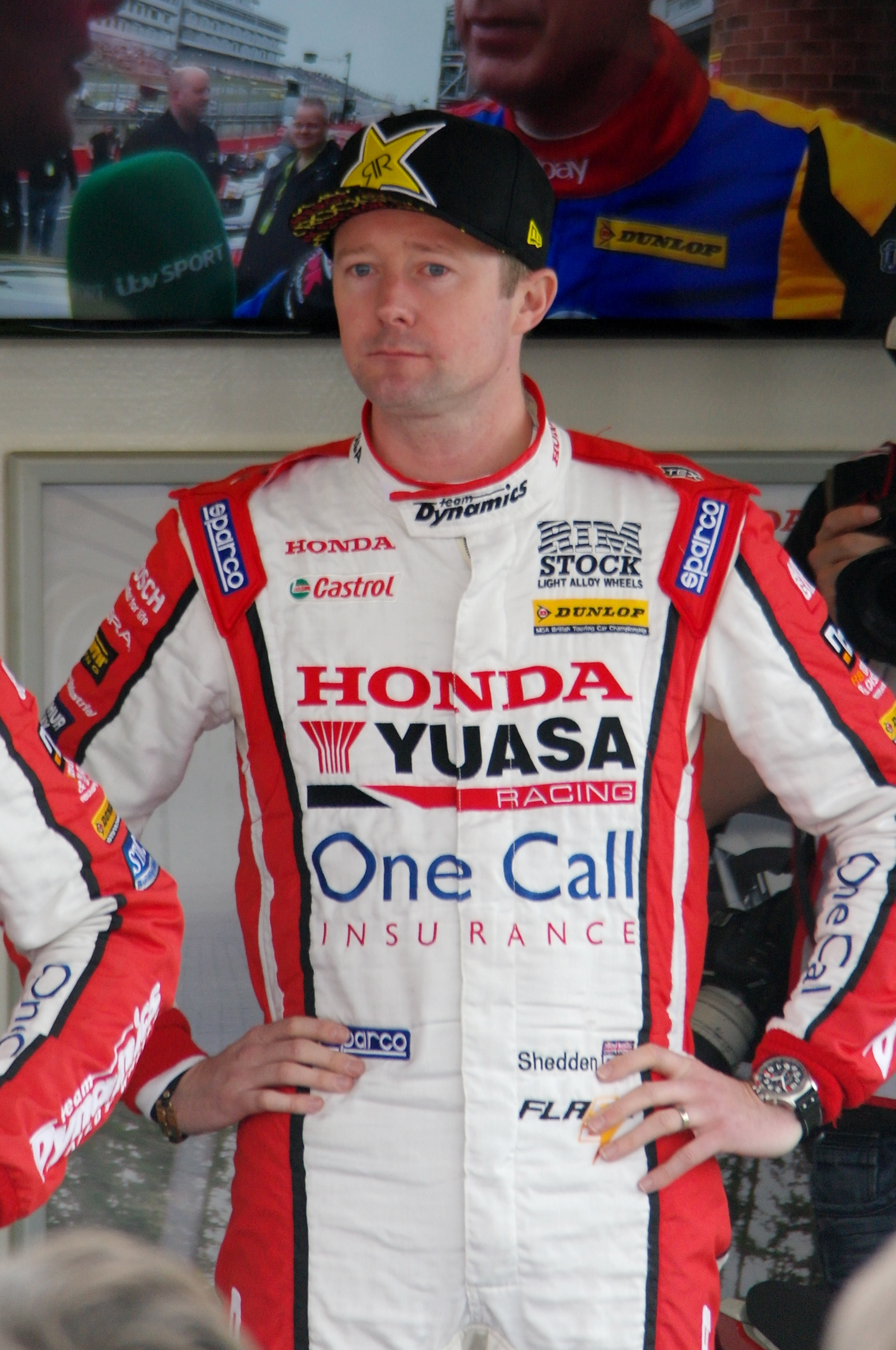
Gordon Shedden, the 2016 Drivers' Champion (pictured in 2014). Shedden won the championship by 2 points.

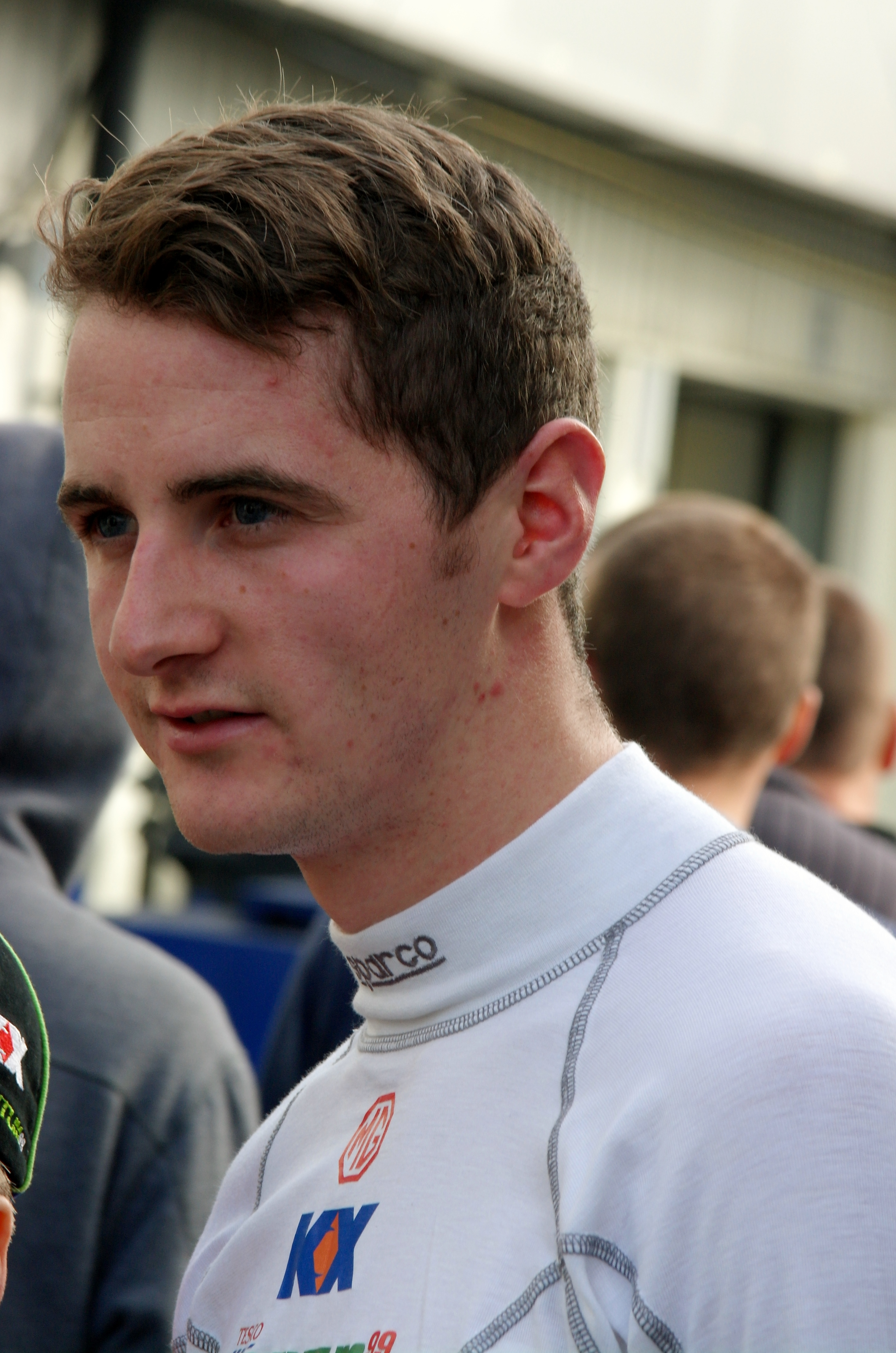
Sam Tordoff finished second in the Drivers' Championship.

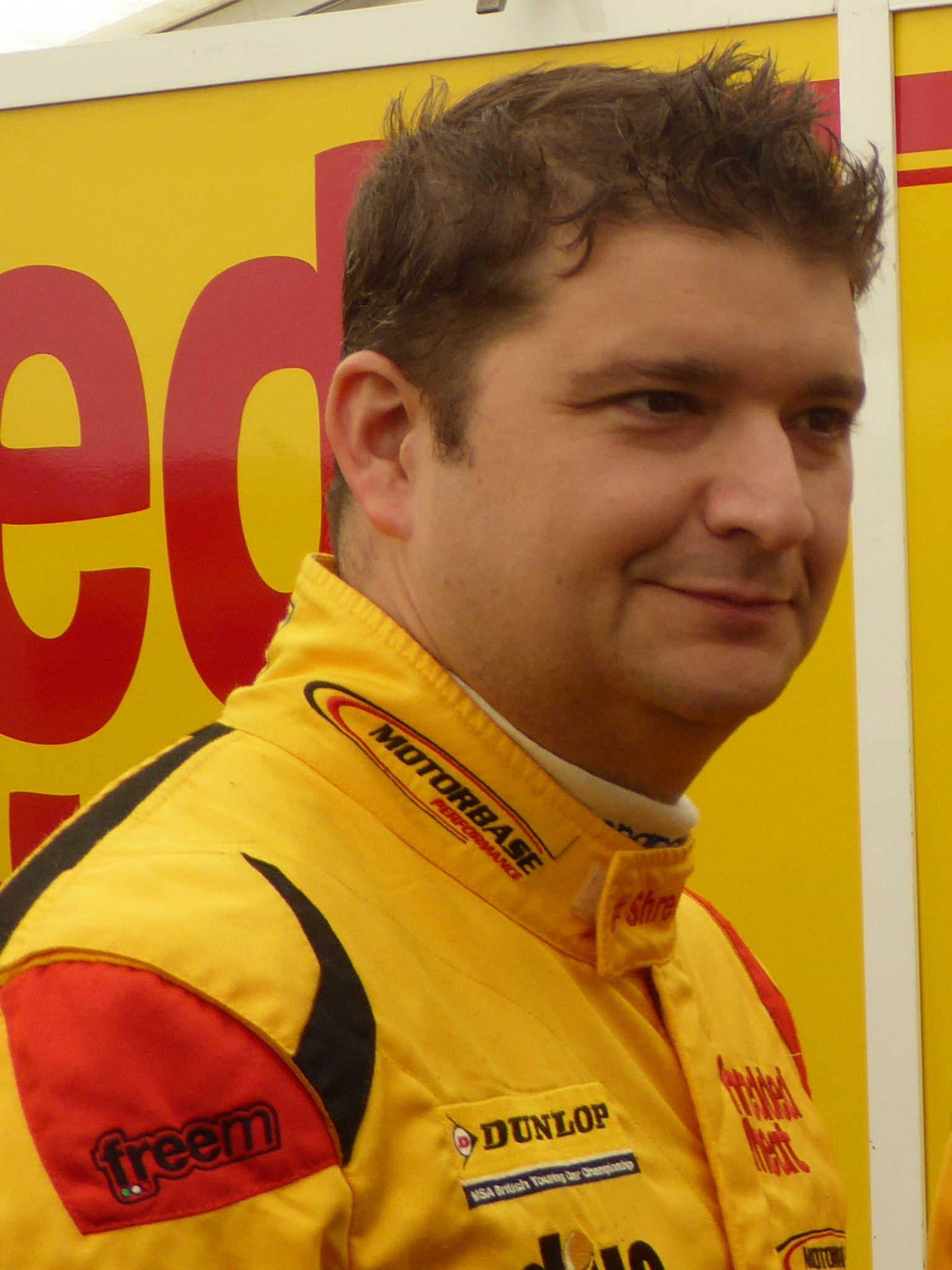
Mat Jackson finished third in the Drivers' Championship.

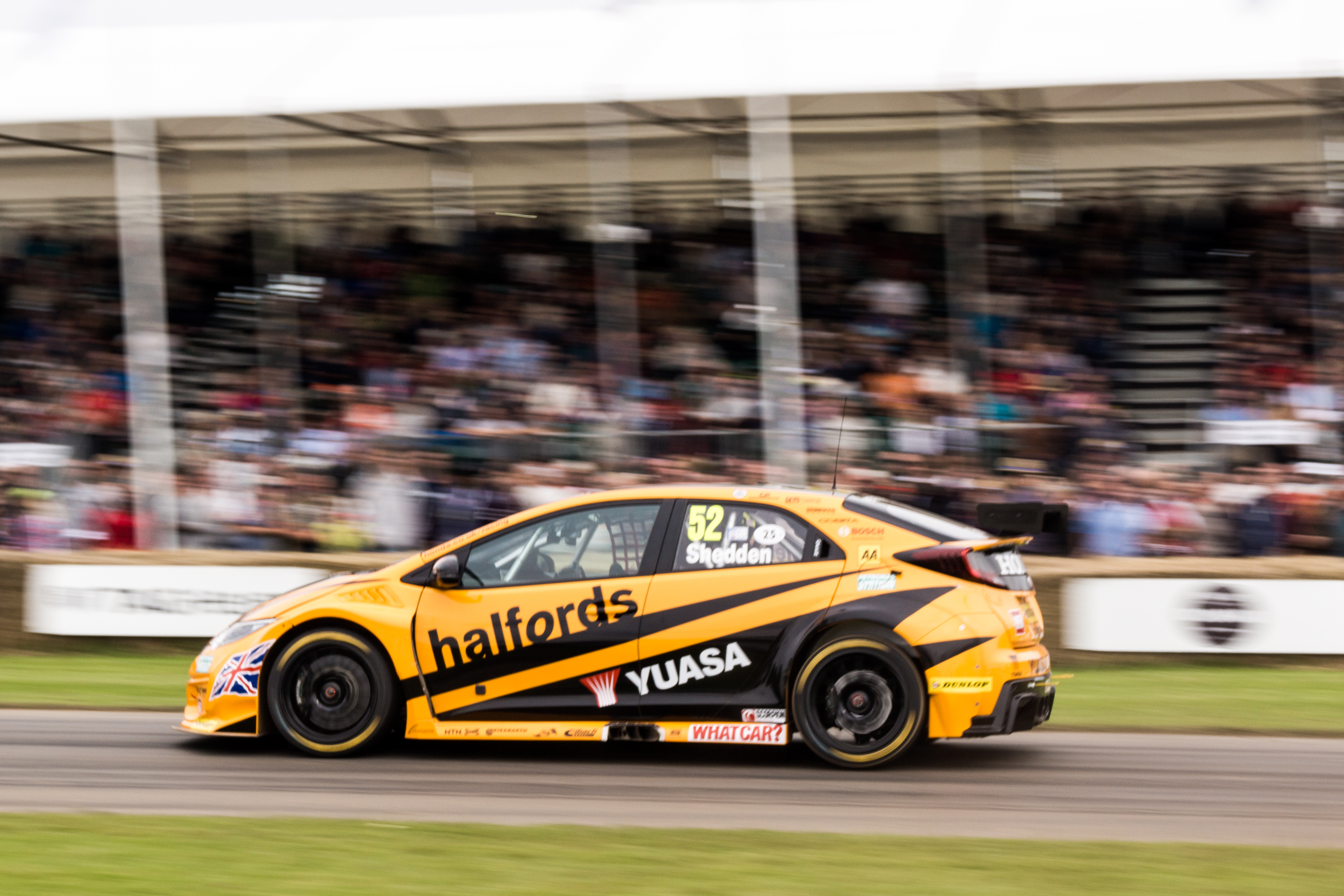
Gordon Shedden's 2016 Championship Winning BTCC Honda Civic Type R

The 2016 Dunlop MSA British Touring Car Championship (commonly abbreviated as BTCC) was a motor racing championship for production-based touring cars held across England and Scotland. The championship featured a mix of professional motor racing teams and privately funded amateur drivers competing in highly modified versions of family cars which are sold to the general public and conform to the technical regulations for the championship. The 2016 season was the 59th British Touring Car Championship season and the sixth season for cars conforming to the Next Generation Touring Car (NGTC) technical specification. Gordon Shedden successfully defended his title and equaled long-time team mate Matt Neal as a three time Champion.

== Teams and drivers ==
Key
Eligible for the Jack Sears Trophy for best rookie of the season

Team	Car	Engine	No.	Drivers	Rounds
Constructor Entries
Silverline Subaru BMR Racing	Subaru Levorg GT	Subaru/Mountune	4	(United Kingdom) Colin Turkington	All
Silverline Subaru BMR Racing	Subaru Levorg GT	Subaru/Mountune	20	(United Kingdom) James Cole	All
Silverline Subaru BMR Racing	Subaru Levorg GT	Subaru/Mountune	39	(United Kingdom) Warren Scott	All
Silverline Subaru BMR Racing	Subaru Levorg GT	Subaru/Mountune	99	(United Kingdom) Jason Plato	All
Halfords Yuasa Racing	Honda Civic Type R	Honda/Neil Brown	25	(United Kingdom) Matt Neal	All
Halfords Yuasa Racing	Honda Civic Type R	Honda/Neil Brown	52	(United Kingdom) Gordon Shedden	All
Halfords Yuasa Racing	Honda Civic Type R	Honda/Neil Brown	57	(United Kingdom) Andy Neate	1
Team IHG Rewards Club	BMW 125i M Sport	BMW/Neil Brown	31	(United Kingdom) Jack Goff	All
Team JCT600 with GardX	BMW 125i M Sport	BMW/Neil Brown	100	(United Kingdom) Rob Collard	All
Team JCT600 with GardX	BMW 125i M Sport	BMW/Neil Brown	600	(United Kingdom) Sam Tordoff	All
MG Racing RCIB Insurance	MG6 GT	TOCA/Swindon	66	(United Kingdom) Josh Cook	All
MG Racing RCIB Insurance	MG6 GT	TOCA/Swindon	116	(United Kingdom) Ashley Sutton	All
Independent Entries
Motorbase Performance	Ford Focus ST	Ford/Mountune	7	(United Kingdom) Mat Jackson	All
Motorbase Performance	Ford Focus ST	Ford/Mountune	77	(United Kingdom) Andrew Jordan	All
Handy Motorsport	Toyota Avensis	TOCA/Swindon	11	(United Kingdom) Rob Austin	All
Speedworks Motorsport	Toyota Avensis	TOCA/Swindon	80	(United Kingdom) Tom Ingram	All
Speedworks Motorsport	Honda Civic Type R	TOCA/Swindon	303	(United Kingdom) Matt Simpson	All
RCIB Insurance Racing	Toyota Avensis	TOCA/Swindon	12	(United Kingdom) Michael Epps	All
RCIB Insurance Racing	Toyota Avensis	TOCA/Swindon	24	(United Kingdom) Jake Hill	All
TLC Racing	Toyota Avensis	TOCA/Swindon	22	(United Kingdom) Chris Smiley	1–5
TLC Racing	Toyota Avensis	TOCA/Swindon	34	(United Kingdom) Tony Gilham	8–10
TLC Racing	Toyota Avensis	TOCA/Swindon	88	(United Kingdom) Michael Caine	6–7
Dextra Racing with Team Parker	Ford Focus ST	Ford/Mountune	14	(United Kingdom) Alex Martin	All
Laser Tools Racing	Mercedes-Benz A-Class	TOCA/Swindon	16	(United Kingdom) Aiden Moffat	All
WIX Racing	Mercedes-Benz A-Class	TOCA/Swindon	33	(United Kingdom) Adam Morgan	All
Goodestone Racing	Proton Persona	TOCA/Swindon	17	(United Kingdom) Daniel Welch	All
Eurotech Racing	Honda Civic Type R	TOCA/Swindon	23	(United Kingdom) Daniel Lloyd	3–5
Eurotech Racing	Honda Civic Type R	TOCA/Swindon	30	(United Kingdom) Martin Depper	All
Eurotech Racing	Honda Civic Type R	TOCA/Swindon	55	(United Kingdom) Jeff Smith	All
Team BKR	Volkswagen CC	TOCA/Swindon	38	(United Kingdom) Mark Howard	All
Team BKR	Volkswagen CC	TOCA/Swindon	40	(Republic of Ireland) Árón Smith	All
AmD Tuning	Audi S3 Saloon	TOCA/Swindon	48	(United Kingdom) Ollie Jackson	All
Power Maxed Racing	Chevrolet Cruze	TOCA/Swindon	54	(United Kingdom) Hunter Abbott	All
Power Maxed Racing	Chevrolet Cruze	TOCA/Swindon	71	(United Kingdom) Dave Newsham	7–8
Power Maxed Racing	Chevrolet Cruze	TOCA/Swindon	84	(United Kingdom) Kelvin Fletcher	1–6, 9–10
Maximum Motorsport	Ford Focus ST	Ford/Mountune	95	(United Kingdom) Stewart Lines	All

=== Driver changes ===
Changed teams

- Andrew Jordan moved from MG Triple Eight Racing to Motorbase Performance.
- Stewart Lines moved from Houseman Racing to Maximum Motorsport.
- Jack Goff moved from MG Triple Eight Racing to Team IHG Rewards Club.
- Rob Austin moved from Exocet AlcoSense Racing to Handy Motosport.
- James Cole moved from Motorbase Performance to Team BMR.
- Hunter Abbott moved from Exocet AlcoSense Racing to Power Maxed Racing.
- Jake Hill moved from AmD Tuning to RCIB Insurance Racing.
- Josh Cook moved from Power Maxed Racing to MG Triple Eight Racing.
- Árón Smith moved from Team BMR to Team BKR.

Entering/re-entering BTCC

- Maximum Motorsport entered the series, having bought AmD Tuning's Ford Focus ST and the team's second TOCA BTCC Licence (TBL).
- Double European Hot Rod champion and twice Quaife Intermarque champion, Matt Simpson, made his debut in the BTCC with Speedworks Motorsport in a Team Dynamics-built Honda Civic Type R.
- 2013 MINI Challenge champion Chris Smiley, made his debut in the BTCC with RCIB Insurance Racing.
- Andy Neate returned to the series with Halfords Yuasa Racing, having last raced in 2013.
- 2015 Renault UK Clio Cup champion Ashley Sutton, made his debut in the BTCC with MG Triple Eight Racing.
- Ollie Jackson returned to the series with AmD Tuning, after a single season away, having last raced with the team in 2012.
- Former VW Racing Cup driver Michael Epps, made his debut in the BTCC with RCIB Insurance Racing.
- Renault UK Clio Cup Masters champion Mark Howard, made his debut with the also debuting Team BKR.
- Actor Kelvin Fletcher, made his debut in the BTCC with Power Maxed Racing.
- Former Porsche Carrera Cup Great Britain driver Daniel Lloyd, made his return in the BTCC with Eurotech Racing after a one-off appearance at Croft in 2010, following the withdrawal of Andy Neate at Halfords Yuasa Racing.

Leaving BTCC

- Houseman Racing left the series, having sold their TBL, car and race equipment to Eurotech Racing.
- Mike Bushell left the series having been unable to secure a top drive, instead he opted to return to the Renault Clio Cup UK.
- Simon Belcher took a sabbatical year from the series, to focus on his team Handy Motorsport.
- Kieran Gallagher left the series, having intended to switch to the new-for-2016 B-TEC Development Series. However, in March 2016, the series was postponed until 2017.
- Dave Newsham left the series, having switched to the British Rallycross Championship.
- Support Our Paras Racing and Derek Palmer Jr. left the series after a single season in the championship.
- Alain Menu left the series, after replacing Warren Scott at Team BMR in the 2015 season finale.
- Nicolas Hamilton left the series, after joining Channel 4's Formula One presentation team.
- Andy Priaulx left the series, having joined Ford's FIA World Endurance Championship LMGTE-Pro program.

=== Team changes ===
- Eurotech Racing switched from a Honda Civic to a Honda Civic Type R. The team was set to expand to a three-car outfit, having bought Houseman Racing's TBL, car and race equipment. However, in March 2016, the team confirmed that they had postponed the expansion to 2017. However, after the withdrawal off Andy Neate at Halfords Yuasa Racing, the team received a third TBL on loan.
- Halfords Yuasa Racing and Speedworks Motorsport were both granted an additional TBL each on 4 November 2015 for the 2016 season.
- Team BMR switched from a Volkswagen CC to a Subaru Levorg Sports Tourer, having gained manufacturer support from Subaru.
- Handy Motorsport was set to expand to a two-car outfit, having gained an additional TBL from Exocet AlcoSense Racing. However, in February 2016, the team confirmed that the expansion had been put on hold for 2017 and instead the team will run a single car during the season.
- Team HARD expanded to a three-car outfit, having gained two additional TBL's following the withdrawal of Exocet AlcoSense Racing and Support Our Paras Racing from the championship.

== Race calendar ==
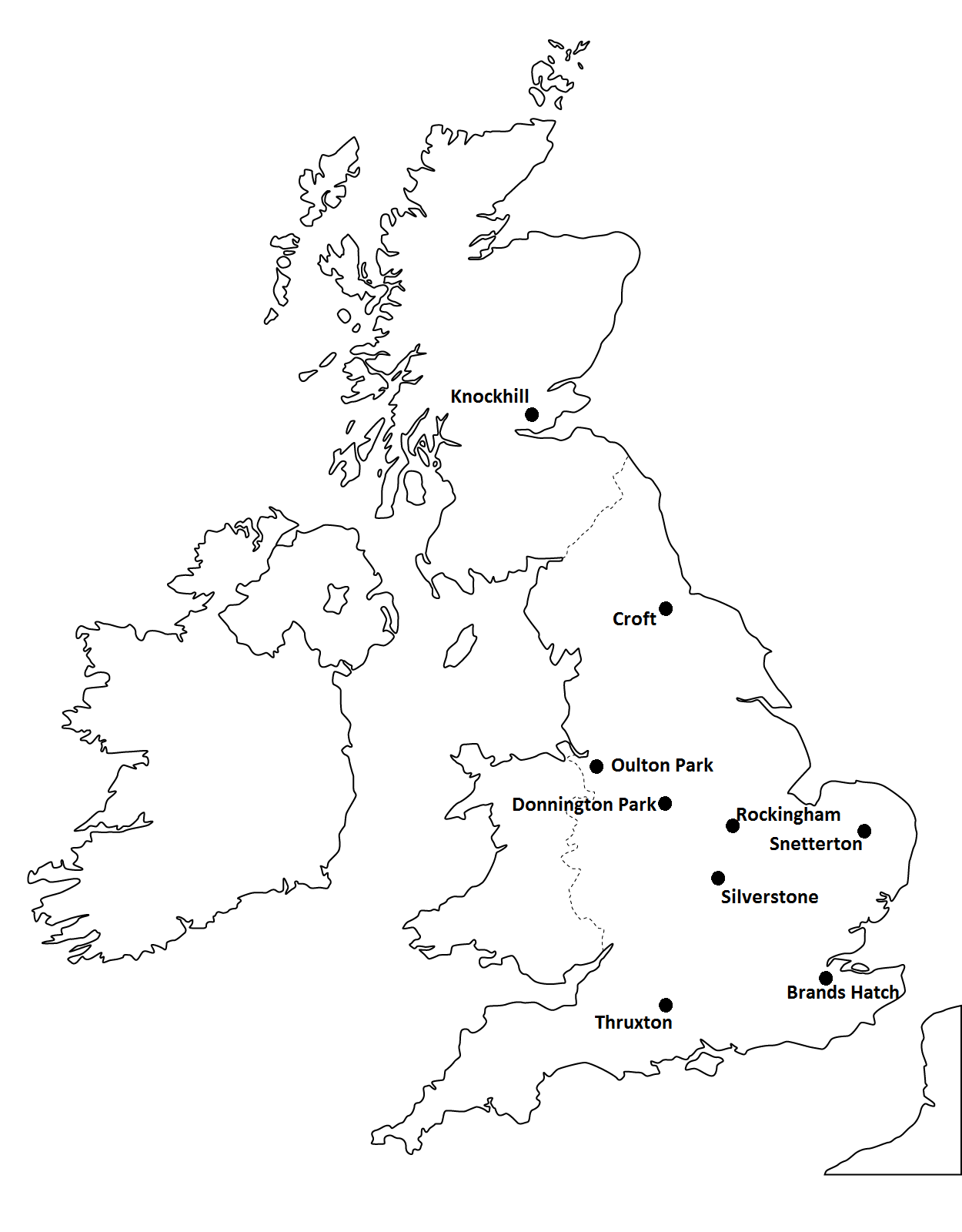
Circuit locations for the 2016 season

The provisional calendar was announced by the championship organisers on 27 July 2015, with no major changes from previous seasons.

Round		Circuit	Date
1	R1	Brands Hatch (Indy Circuit, Kent)	3 April
1	R2	Brands Hatch (Indy Circuit, Kent)	3 April
1	R3	Brands Hatch (Indy Circuit, Kent)	3 April
2	R4	Donington Park (National Circuit, Leicestershire)	17 April
2	R5	Donington Park (National Circuit, Leicestershire)	17 April
2	R6	Donington Park (National Circuit, Leicestershire)	17 April
3	R7	Thruxton Circuit (Hampshire)	8 May
3	R8	Thruxton Circuit (Hampshire)	8 May
3	R9	Thruxton Circuit (Hampshire)	8 May
4	R10	Oulton Park (Island Circuit, Cheshire)	5 June
4	R11	Oulton Park (Island Circuit, Cheshire)	5 June
4	R12	Oulton Park (Island Circuit, Cheshire)	5 June
5	R13	Croft Circuit (North Yorkshire)	19 June
5	R14	Croft Circuit (North Yorkshire)	19 June
5	R15	Croft Circuit (North Yorkshire)	19 June
6	R16	Snetterton Motor Racing Circuit (300 Circuit, Norfolk)	31 July
6	R17	Snetterton Motor Racing Circuit (300 Circuit, Norfolk)	31 July
6	R18	Snetterton Motor Racing Circuit (300 Circuit, Norfolk)	31 July
7	R19	Knockhill Racing Circuit (Fife)	14 August
7	R20	Knockhill Racing Circuit (Fife)	14 August
7	R21	Knockhill Racing Circuit (Fife)	14 August
8	R22	Rockingham Motor Speedway (International Super Sports Car Circuit, Northamptonshire)	28 August
8	R23	Rockingham Motor Speedway (International Super Sports Car Circuit, Northamptonshire)	28 August
8	R24	Rockingham Motor Speedway (International Super Sports Car Circuit, Northamptonshire)	28 August
9	R25	Silverstone Circuit (National Circuit, Northamptonshire)	18 September
9	R26	Silverstone Circuit (National Circuit, Northamptonshire)	18 September
9	R27	Silverstone Circuit (National Circuit, Northamptonshire)	18 September
10	R28	Brands Hatch (Grand Prix Circuit, Kent)	2 October
10	R29	Brands Hatch (Grand Prix Circuit, Kent)	2 October
10	R30	Brands Hatch (Grand Prix Circuit, Kent)	2 October

== Results ==
Round		Circuit	Pole position	Fastest lap	Winning driver	Winning team	Winning independent	Winning JST
1	R1	Brands Hatch Indy	(United Kingdom) Tom Ingram	(United Kingdom) Jack Goff	(United Kingdom) Tom Ingram	Speedworks Motorsport	(United Kingdom) Tom Ingram	(United Kingdom) Ashley Sutton
1	R2	Brands Hatch Indy		(United Kingdom) Andrew Jordan	(United Kingdom) Gordon Shedden	Halfords Yuasa Racing	(Republic of Ireland) Árón Smith	(United Kingdom) Ashley Sutton
1	R3	Brands Hatch Indy		(United Kingdom) Adam Morgan	(United Kingdom) Adam Morgan	WIX Racing	(United Kingdom) Adam Morgan	(United Kingdom) Ashley Sutton
2	R4	Donington Park	(United Kingdom) Ashley Sutton	(United Kingdom) Mat Jackson	(United Kingdom) Mat Jackson	Motorbase Performance	(United Kingdom) Mat Jackson	(United Kingdom) Ashley Sutton
2	R5	Donington Park		(United Kingdom) Sam Tordoff	(United Kingdom) Rob Collard	Team JCT600 with GardX	(United Kingdom) Mat Jackson	(United Kingdom) Ashley Sutton
2	R6	Donington Park		(United Kingdom) Jack Goff	(United Kingdom) Matt Neal	Halfords Yuasa Racing	(United Kingdom) Aiden Moffat	(United Kingdom) Ashley Sutton
3	R7	Thruxton Circuit	(United Kingdom) Tom Ingram	(United Kingdom) Adam Morgan	(United Kingdom) Adam Morgan	WIX Racing	(United Kingdom) Adam Morgan	(United Kingdom) Michael Epps
3	R8	Thruxton Circuit		(United Kingdom) Sam Tordoff	(United Kingdom) Andrew Jordan	Motorbase Performance	(United Kingdom) Andrew Jordan	(United Kingdom) Daniel Lloyd
3	R9	Thruxton Circuit		(United Kingdom) Aiden Moffat	(United Kingdom) Mat Jackson	Motorbase Performance	(United Kingdom) Mat Jackson	(United Kingdom) Ashley Sutton
4	R10	Oulton Park	(United Kingdom) Colin Turkington	(United Kingdom) Jason Plato	(United Kingdom) Colin Turkington	Silverline Subaru BMR Racing	(United Kingdom) Tom Ingram	(United Kingdom) Daniel Lloyd
4	R11	Oulton Park		(United Kingdom) Rob Collard	(United Kingdom) Sam Tordoff	Team JCT600 with GardX	(United Kingdom) Tom Ingram	(United Kingdom) Daniel Lloyd
4	R12	Oulton Park		(United Kingdom) Rob Collard	(United Kingdom) Matt Neal	Halfords Yuasa Racing	(United Kingdom) Tom Ingram	(United Kingdom) Ashley Sutton
5	R13	Croft Circuit	(United Kingdom) Colin Turkington	(United Kingdom) Colin Turkington	(United Kingdom) Colin Turkington	Silverline Subaru BMR Racing	(United Kingdom) Andrew Jordan	(United Kingdom) Ashley Sutton
5	R14	Croft Circuit		(United Kingdom) Jack Goff	(United Kingdom) Rob Collard	Team JCT600 with GardX	(United Kingdom) Mat Jackson	(United Kingdom) Ashley Sutton
5	R15	Croft Circuit		(United Kingdom) Ashley Sutton	(United Kingdom) Ashley Sutton	MG Racing RCIB Insurance	(United Kingdom) Tom Ingram	(United Kingdom) Ashley Sutton
6	R16	Snetterton Motor Racing Circuit	(United Kingdom) Gordon Shedden	(United Kingdom) Hunter Abbott	(United Kingdom) Colin Turkington	Silverline Subaru BMR Racing	(United Kingdom) Mat Jackson	(United Kingdom) Michael Epps
6	R17	Snetterton Motor Racing Circuit		(United Kingdom) Rob Collard	(United Kingdom) Mat Jackson	Motorbase Performance	(United Kingdom) Mat Jackson	(United Kingdom) Matt Simpson
6	R18	Snetterton Motor Racing Circuit		(United Kingdom) Gordon Shedden	(United Kingdom) Gordon Shedden	Halfords Yuasa Racing	(United Kingdom) Rob Austin	(United Kingdom) Ashley Sutton
7	R19	Knockhill Racing Circuit	(United Kingdom) Jason Plato	(United Kingdom) Colin Turkington	(United Kingdom) Jason Plato	Silverline Subaru BMR Racing	(United Kingdom) Tom Ingram	(United Kingdom) Ashley Sutton
7	R20	Knockhill Racing Circuit		(United Kingdom) Adam Morgan	(United Kingdom) Matt Neal	Halfords Yuasa Racing	(United Kingdom) Mat Jackson	(United Kingdom) Matt Simpson
7	R21	Knockhill Racing Circuit		(United Kingdom) Gordon Shedden	(United Kingdom) Mat Jackson	Motorbase Performance	(United Kingdom) Mat Jackson	(United Kingdom) Matt Simpson
8	R22	Rockingham Motor Speedway	(United Kingdom) Gordon Shedden	(United Kingdom) Gordon Shedden	(United Kingdom) Gordon Shedden	Halfords Yuasa Racing	(United Kingdom) Mat Jackson	(United Kingdom) Ashley Sutton
8	R23	Rockingham Motor Speedway		(United Kingdom) Rob Collard	(United Kingdom) Sam Tordoff	Team JCT600 with GardX	(United Kingdom) Andrew Jordan	(United Kingdom) Ashley Sutton
8	R24	Rockingham Motor Speedway		(Republic of Ireland) Árón Smith	(Republic of Ireland) Árón Smith	Team BKR	(Republic of Ireland) Árón Smith	(United Kingdom) Ashley Sutton
9	R25	Silverstone Circuit	(United Kingdom) Ashley Sutton	(United Kingdom) Tom Ingram (United Kingdom) Adam Morgan	(United Kingdom) Tom Ingram	Speedworks Motorsport	(United Kingdom) Tom Ingram	(United Kingdom) Mark Howard
9	R26	Silverstone Circuit		(United Kingdom) James Cole	(United Kingdom) Andrew Jordan	Motorbase Performance	(United Kingdom) Andrew Jordan	(United Kingdom) Michael Epps
9	R27	Silverstone Circuit		(United Kingdom) Ashley Sutton	(United Kingdom) Gordon Shedden	Halfords Yuasa Racing	(United Kingdom) Mat Jackson	(United Kingdom) Ashley Sutton
10	R28	Brands Hatch GP	(United Kingdom) Colin Turkington	(United Kingdom) Colin Turkington	(United Kingdom) Colin Turkington	Silverline Subaru BMR Racing	(United Kingdom) Rob Austin	(United Kingdom) Ashley Sutton
10	R29	Brands Hatch GP		(United Kingdom) Matt Neal	(United Kingdom) Colin Turkington	Silverline Subaru BMR Racing	(United Kingdom) Aiden Moffat	(United Kingdom) Michael Epps
10	R30	Brands Hatch GP		(United Kingdom) Jack Goff	(United Kingdom) Mat Jackson	Motorbase Performance	(United Kingdom) Mat Jackson	(United Kingdom) Matt Simpson

== Championship standings ==
Points system
1st	2nd	3rd	4th	5th	6th	7th	8th	9th	10th	11th	12th	13th	14th	15th	R1 PP	Fastest lap	Lead a lap
20	17	15	13	11	10	9	8	7	6	5	4	3	2	1	1	1	1

Notes

- No driver may collect more than one point for leading a lap per race regardless of how many laps they lead.

=== Drivers' Championship ===
(key)

Pos	Driver	BHI			DON			THR			OUL			CRO			SNE			KNO			ROC			SIL			BHGP			Pts
1	(United Kingdom) Gordon Shedden	2	1*	Ret	11	4	2	Ret	4	Ret	4	4	23	15	13	22	2*	10	1*	9	9	4	1*	10*	2	23	8	1*	5	3	3	308
2	(United Kingdom) Sam Tordoff	16	9	2	9	8	3*	7	6	8	2	1*	2	13	8	2*	7	8	Ret	5	2*	2	10	1*	16	11	11	6	10	5	5	306
3	(United Kingdom) Mat Jackson	8	5	25	1*	2*	14	21	8	1*	16	10	13	8	6	Ret	3	1*	Ret	12	6	1*	2	4*	5	17	6	2	11	7	1*	292
4	(United Kingdom) Colin Turkington	Ret	20	12	10	Ret	18	WD	WD	WD	1*	2	7	1*	3*	7	1*	2	6	3	4	24	5	15	3	8	4	4	1*	1*	12	289
5	(United Kingdom) Rob Collard	6	16	6	6	1*	4	6	2	6	23	25	6	7	1*	4	16	4	2*	17	5	Ret	14	3	6	7	7	3*	12	10	9	278
6	(United Kingdom) Matt Neal	3	2	5	12	6	1*	Ret*	11	2	9	7	1*	12	10	11	8	3	10	8	1*	5	8	6	4	Ret	15	5	7	Ret	DNS	275
7	(United Kingdom) Jason Plato	21	13	16	17	20	16	WD	WD	WD	3	3	3	2	2*	10	5	6	4*	1*	3*	3	3	Ret	10	10	5	12	4	2	10	256
8	(United Kingdom) Andrew Jordan	11	4	4	14	12	10	3	1*	21	10	8	8	5	9	5	14	14	5	6	8	9	7	2	12	2	1*	8	Ret	13	11	255
9	(United Kingdom) Adam Morgan	9	8	1*	13	11	Ret	1*	3*	3	24	12	10	Ret	Ret	14	4	5	7	22	11	6	13	8	7	4	2	23	6	8	4	241
10	(United Kingdom) Tom Ingram	1*	Ret*	17	3	15	19	2	20	Ret	5	5	4	9	7	3	6	7	12	4	Ret	12	16	Ret	Ret	1*	3*	Ret	14	9	6	220
11	(United Kingdom) Jack Goff	10	7	3	4	5	6	8	5	18	12	9	Ret	4	4	9	11	Ret	13	2	7	10	12	Ret	Ret	12	13	11	13	20	13	193
12	(United Kingdom) Josh Cook	5	Ret	14	2	7	9	Ret	12	4	7	6	5	17	14	6	26	13	9	18	16	Ret	4	Ret	15	DSQ	17	7	3	4	7	175
13	(United Kingdom) Ashley Sutton	4	6	10	5	13	5	Ret	15	5	19	27	12	3	5	1*	25	Ret	14	11	Ret	Ret	6	5	19	DSQ	26	10	9	Ret	24	162
14	(United Kingdom) Aiden Moffat	12	11	9	16	9	7	22	16	22	32	Ret	20	Ret	17	Ret	23	11	8	13	10	8	11	9	9	9	9	9	8	6	2	138
15	(Republic of Ireland) Árón Smith	7	3	8	8	3	15	20	18	Ret	8	17	11	10	11	8	Ret	Ret	17	NC	Ret	18	15	7	1*	6	24	Ret	Ret	14	20	132
16	(United Kingdom) Rob Austin	Ret	14	11	18	10	8	14	10	7	15	Ret	16	11	12	12	13	9	3	10	12	7	20	14	Ret	3	Ret	Ret	2	Ret	14	129
17	(United Kingdom) Jake Hill	13	Ret	23	26	Ret	Ret	10	17	13	13	26	9	6	20	20	12	12	11	16	13	15	Ret	16	8	5	27	14	15	12	8	83
18	(United Kingdom) Jeff Smith	14	10	7	7	18	Ret	4	25	11	21	15	Ret	20	18	18	Ret	15	15	Ret	15	Ret	25	17	13	15	25	15	19	11	17	55
19	(United Kingdom) Hunter Abbott	Ret	15	13	15	14	12	15	Ret	Ret	11	11	19	Ret	19	Ret	15	Ret	Ret	20	22	Ret	26	NC	14	13	10	13	Ret	17	Ret	38
20	(United Kingdom) Daniel Lloyd							12	7	9	6	13	Ret	Ret	23	13																36
21	(United Kingdom) Martin Depper	19	22	24	Ret	17	11	5	Ret	12	14	14	15	18	28	16	Ret	Ret	16	14	Ret	16	Ret	Ret	21	Ret	18	Ret	17	18	15	28
22	(United Kingdom) Dave Newsham																			7	14	11	9	11	Ret							28
23	(United Kingdom) Dan Welch	15	12	20	Ret	Ret	24	9	9	Ret	20	24	17	Ret	Ret	17	17	Ret	DNS	21	20	14	Ret	Ret	Ret	21	14	25	22	27	Ret	23
24	(United Kingdom) Michael Epps	20	17	21	19	24	13	11	14	10	25	16	Ret	14	Ret	15	20	19	20	19	Ret	20	18	Ret	23	18	12	16	16	16	25	23
25	(United Kingdom) James Cole	25	19	18	Ret	DNS	DNS	WD	WD	WD	18	Ret	Ret	Ret	Ret	21	10	Ret	19	15	21	13	22	12	18	Ret	23	21	23	21	16	15
26	(United Kingdom) Ollie Jackson	Ret	23	22	21	Ret	Ret	17	21	14	26	20	25	19	15	26	19	Ret	Ret	23	Ret	19	17	13	11	14	16	17	18	15	Ret	14
27	(United Kingdom) Warren Scott	DNS	21	19	25	19	Ret	WD	WD	WD	17	18	24	16	26	Ret	9	16	Ret	Ret	Ret	25	19	NC	Ret	Ret	29	DNS	Ret	23	Ret	7
28	(United Kingdom) Alex Martin	Ret	24	27	20	16	22	16	19	15	30	19	14	21	25	25	Ret	20	Ret	27	18	21	23	19	17	NC	20	18	21	22	19	3
29	(United Kingdom) Matt Simpson	17	18	15	Ret	22	23	13	13	Ret	22	Ret	18	22	16	Ret	22	17	Ret	Ret	19	17	Ret	DNS	20	20	Ret	24	20	19	18	1
30	(United Kingdom) Chris Smiley	24	28	Ret	22	21	17	18	22	16	28	22	21	24	24	23																0
31	(United Kingdom) Stewart Lines	22	Ret	28	Ret	25	21	19	24	20	27	21	Ret	23	21	19	21	18	21	25	17	22	21	18	22	19	19	22	25	25	22	0
32	(United Kingdom) Kelvin Fletcher	Ret	25	Ret	24	Ret	20	Ret	23	17	29	23	22	Ret	22	Ret	Ret	Ret	18							22	22	26	24	24	21	0
33	(United Kingdom) Michael Caine																18	Ret	DNS	24	DNS	DNS										0
34	(United Kingdom) Andy Neate	18	26	26																												0
35	(United Kingdom) Tony Gilham																						24	Ret	Ret	NC	21	20	Ret	28	Ret	0
36	(United Kingdom) Mark Howard	23	27	Ret	23	23	Ret	Ret	26	19	31	Ret	Ret	Ret	27	24	24	21	Ret	26	23	23	Ret	20	Ret	16	28	19	Ret	26	23	-3
Pos	Driver	BHI			DON			THR			OUL			CRO			SNE			KNO			ROC			SIL			BHGP			Pts

=== Manufacturers'/Constructors' Championship ===
Pos	Manufacturer/Constructor	BHI			DON			THR			OUL			CRO			SNE			KNO			ROC			SIL			BHGP			Pts
1	BMW / West Surrey Racing	6	7	2	4	5	4	6	5	6	2	1	2	7	1	2	7	4	2	2	2	2	10	1	6	11	11	6	10	5	5	790
1	BMW / West Surrey Racing	10	9	3	6	8	6	7	6	8	12	9	Ret	13	8	4	16	8	DNS	5	7	10	14	3	16	12	13	11	12	10	9	790
2	Honda / Team Dynamics	2	1	5	11	4	1	Ret	4	2	4	4	1	12	10	11	2	3	1	8	1	4	1	6	2	23	8	1	5	3	3	737
2	Honda / Team Dynamics	3	2	Ret	12	6	2	Ret	11	Ret	9	7	23	15	13	22	8	10	10	9	9	5	8	10	4	Ret	15	5	7	Ret	DNS	737
3	Subaru / Team BMR	21	13	12	10	19	16	WD	WD	WD	1	2	3	1	2	7	1	2	4	1	3	3	3	15	3	8	4	4	1	1	10	722
3	Subaru / Team BMR	Ret	19	16	17	Ret	18	WD	WD	WD	3	3	7	2	3	10	5	6	6	3	4	24	5	Ret	10	10	5	12	4	2	12	722
4	MG / Triple Eight Racing	4	6	10	2	7	5	Ret	12	4	7	6	5	3	5	1	25	13	9	11	16	Ret	4	5	15	EX	17	7	3	4	7	571
4	MG / Triple Eight Racing	5	Ret	14	5	13	9	Ret	15	5	19	27	12	17	14	6	26	Ret	14	18	Ret	Ret	6	Ret	19	EX	26	10	9	Ret	24	571
Pos	Manufacturer/Constructor	BHI			DON			THR			OUL			CRO			SNE			KNO			ROC			SIL			BHGP			Pts

=== Teams' Championship ===
Pos	Team	BHI			DON			THR			OUL			CRO			SNE			KNO			ROC			SIL			BHGP			Pts
1	Team JCT600 with GardX	6	9	2	6	1	3	6	2	6	2	1	2	7	1	2	7	4	2	5	2	2	10	1	6	7	7	3	10	5	5	574
1	Team JCT600 with GardX	16	16	6	9	8	4	7	6	8	23	25	6	13	8	4	16	8	DNS	17	5	Ret	14	3	16	11	11	6	12	10	9	574
2	Halfords Yuasa Racing	2	1	5	11	4	1	Ret	4	2	4	4	1	12	10	11	2	3	1	8	1	4	1	6	2	Ret	8	1	5	3	3	557
2	Halfords Yuasa Racing	3	2	26	12	6	2	Ret	11	Ret	9	7	23	15	13	22	8	10	10	9	9	5	8	10	4	Ret	15	5	7	Ret	DNS	557
3	Motorbase Performance	8	4	4	1	2	10	3	1	1	10	8	8	5	6	5	3	1	5	6	6	1	2	2	5	2	1	2	11	7	1	538
3	Motorbase Performance	11	5	25	14	12	14	21	8	21	16	10	13	8	9	Ret	14	14	Ret	12	8	9	7	4	12	17	6	8	Ret	13	11	538
4	Silverline Subaru BMR Racing	21	13	12	10	19	16	WD	WD	WD	1	2	3	1	2	7	1	2	4	1	3	3	3	15	3	8	4	4	1	1	10	531
4	Silverline Subaru BMR Racing	25	19	16	17	20	18	WD	WD	WD	3	3	7	2	3	10	5	6	6	3	4	24	5	Ret	10	10	5	12	4	2	12	531
5	MG Racing RCIB Insurance	4	6	10	2	7	5	Ret	12	4	7	6	5	3	5	1	25	13	9	11	16	Ret	4	5	15	EX	17	7	3	4	7	332
5	MG Racing RCIB Insurance	5	Ret	14	5	13	9	Ret	15	5	19	27	12	17	14	6	26	Ret	14	18	Ret	Ret	6	Ret	19	EX	26	10	9	Ret	24	332
6	WIX Racing	9	8	1	13	11	Ret	1	3	3	24	12	10	Ret	Ret	14	4	5	7	22	11	6	13	8	7	4	2	23	6	8	4	234
7	Speedworks Motorsport	1	18	15	3	15	19	2	13	23	5	5	4	9	7	3	6	7	12	4	19	12	16	DNS	20	1	3	24	14	9	6	202
7	Speedworks Motorsport	17	Ret	17	Ret	22	23	13	20	Ret	22	Ret	18	22	16	Ret	22	17	Ret	Ret	Ret	17	Ret	DNS	Ret	20	Ret	Ret	20	19	18	202
8	Team IHG Rewards Club	10	7	3	4	5	6	8	5	18	12	9	Ret	4	4	9	11	Ret	13	2	7	10	12	Ret	Ret	12	13	11	13	20	13	192
9	Laser Tools Racing	12	11	9	16	9	7	22	16	22	32	Ret	20	Ret	17	Ret	23	11	8	13	10	8	11	9	9	9	9	9	8	6	2	137
10	Handy Motorsport	Ret	14	11	18	10	8	14	10	7	15	Ret	16	11	12	12	13	9	3	10	12	7	20	14	Ret	3	Ret	Ret	2	Ret	14	136
11	RCIB Insurance Racing	13	17	21	19	24	13	10	14	10	13	16	9	6	20	15	12	12	11	16	13	15	18	16	8	5	12	14	15	12	8	116
11	RCIB Insurance Racing	20	Ret	23	26	Ret	Ret	11	17	13	25	26	Ret	14	Ret	20	20	19	20	19	Ret	20	Ret	Ret	23	18	27	16	Ret	24	Ret	116
12	Team BKR	7	3	8	8	3	15	20	18	19	8	17	11	10	11	8	24	21	17	26	23	18	15	7	1	6	24	19	Ret	14	20	110
12	Team BKR	23	27	Ret	23	23	Ret	Ret	26	Ret	31	Ret	NC	Ret	27	24	Ret	NC	Ret	NC	Ret	23	Ret	20	Ret	16	28	Ret	Ret	26	23	110
13	Eurotech Racing	14	10	7	7	17	11	4	7	9	6	13	15	18	18	13	Ret	15	15	Ret	15	Ret	25	17	13	15	18	15	17	11	15	105
13	Eurotech Racing	19	22	24	Ret	18	Ret	12	25	11	14	14	Ret	20	23	16	Ret	Ret	16				Ret	Ret	21	Ret	25	Ret	19	18	17	105
14	Power Maxed Racing	Ret	15	13	15	14	12	15	23	17	11	11	19	Ret	19	Ret	15	Ret	18	7	14	11	9	11	14	13	10	13	16	16	21	68
14	Power Maxed Racing	Ret	25	Ret	24	Ret	20	Ret	Ret	Ret	29	23	22	Ret	22	Ret	Ret	Ret	Ret	20	22	Ret	26	NC	Ret	22	22	26	24	17	25	68
15	Goodestone Racing	15	12	20	Ret	Ret	24	9	9	Ret	20	24	17	Ret	Ret	17	17	Ret	DNS	21	20	14	Ret	DNS	Ret	21	14	25	22	27	Ret	26
16	AmD Tuning	Ret	23	22	21	Ret	Ret	17	21	14	26	20	25	19	15	26	19	Ret	Ret	23	Ret	19	17	13	11	14	16	17	18	15	Ret	16
17	Dextra Racing with Team Parker	Ret	24	27	20	16	22	16	19	15	30	19	14	21	25	25	Ret	20	Ret	27	18	21	23	19	17	NC	20	18	21	22	19	5
18	TLC Racing	24	28	Ret	22	21	17	18	22	16	28	22	21	24	24	23	18	Ret	DNS	24	DNS	DNS	24	Ret	Ret	NC	21	20	Ret	28	Ret	1
19	Maximum Motorsport	22	Ret	28	NC	25	21	19	24	20	27	21	Ret	23	21	19	21	18	21	25	17	22	21	18	22	19	19	22	25	25	22	0
Pos	Team	BHI			DON			THR			OUL			CRO			SNE			KNO			ROC			SIL			BHGP			Pts

=== Independents' Trophy ===
Pos	Driver	BHI			DON			THR			OUL			CRO			SNE			KNO			ROC			SIL			BHGP			Pts
1	(United Kingdom) Andrew Jordan	11	4	4	14	12	10	3	1	21	10	8	8	5	9	5	14	10	5	6	8	9	7	2	12	2	1	8	Ret	13	11	415
2	(United Kingdom) Mat Jackson	8	5	25	1	2	14	21	8	1	16	10	13	8	6	Ret	3	1	Ret	12	6	1	2	4	5	17	6	2	11	7	1	412
3	(United Kingdom) Adam Morgan	9	8	1	13	11	Ret	1	3	3	24	12	10	Ret	Ret	14	4	5	7	22	11	6	13	8	7	4	2	23	6	8	4	361
4	(United Kingdom) Tom Ingram	1	Ret	17	3	15	19	2	20	Ret	5	5	4	9	7	3	6	7	12	4	Ret	12	16	DNS	Ret	1	3	Ret	14	9	6	338
5	(United Kingdom) Aiden Moffat	12	11	9	16	9	7	22	16	22	32	Ret	20	Ret	17	Ret	23	11	8	13	10	8	11	9	9	9	9	9	8	6	2	278
6	(United Kingdom) Rob Austin	Ret	14	11	18	10	8	14	10	7	15	Ret	16	11	11	12	13	9	3	10	12	7	20	14	Ret	3	Ret	Ret	2	Ret	14	272
7	(Republic of Ireland) Árón Smith	7	3	8	8	3	15	20	18	Ret	8	17	11	10	11	8	Ret	NC	17	NC	Ret	18	15	7	1	6	24	Ret	Ret	14	20	243
8	(United Kingdom) Jake Hill	13	Ret	23	26	Ret	Ret	10	17	13	13	26	9	6	20	20	12	12	11	16	13	15	Ret	16	8	5	27	14	15	12	8	218
9	(United Kingdom) Jeff Smith	14	10	7	7	18	Ret	4	25	11	21	15	Ret	20	18	18	Ret	15	15	Ret	15	Ret	25	17	13	15	25	15	19	11	17	187
10	(United Kingdom) Michael Epps	20	17	21	19	24	13	11	14	10	25	16	Ret	14	Ret	15	20	19	20	19	Ret	20	18	Ret	23	18	12	16	16	16	25	155
11	(United Kingdom) Hunter Abbott	Ret	15	13	15	14	12	15	Ret	Ret	11	11	19	Ret	19	Ret	15	Ret	Ret	20	22	Ret	26	NC	14	13	10	13	Ret	17	Ret	145
12	(United Kingdom) Martin Depper	19	22	24	Ret	17	11	5	Ret	12	14	14	15	18	28	16	Ret	Ret	16	14	Ret	16	Ret	Ret	21	Ret	18	Ret	17	18	15	145
13	(United Kingdom) Ollie Jackson	Ret	23	22	21	Ret	Ret	17	21	14	26	20	25	19	15	26	19	Ret	Ret	23	Ret	19	17	13	11	14	16	17	18	15	Ret	119
14	(United Kingdom) Dan Welch	15	12	20	Ret	Ret	24	9	9	Ret	20	24	17	Ret	Ret	17	17	Ret	DNS	21	20	14	Ret	DNS	Ret	21	14	25	22	27	Ret	100
15	(United Kingdom) Matt Simpson	17	18	15	Ret	22	23	13	13	Ret	22	Ret	18	22	16	Ret	22	17	Ret	Ret	19	17	Ret	DNS	20	20	Ret	24	20	19	18	97
16	(United Kingdom) Alex Martin	Ret	24	27	20	16	22	16	19	15	27	19	14	21	25	25	Ret	20	Ret	27	18	21	23	19	17	NC	20	18	21	22	19	97
17	(United Kingdom) Daniel Lloyd							12	7	9	6	13	Ret	Ret	23	13																75
18	(United Kingdom) Stewart Lines	22	Ret	28	NC	25	21	19	24	20	27	21	Ret	23	21	19	21	18	21	25	17	22	21	18	22	19	19	22	25	25	22	73
19	(United Kingdom) Dave Newsham																			7	14	11	9	11	Ret							59
20	(United Kingdom) Chris Smiley	24	28	Ret	22	21	17	18	22	16	28	22	21	24	24	23																32
21	(United Kingdom) Kelvin Fletcher	Ret	25	Ret	24	Ret	20	Ret	23	17	29	23	22	Ret	22	Ret	Ret	Ret	18							22	22	26	24	24	21	30
22	(United Kingdom) Mark Howard	23	27	Ret	23	23	Ret	Ret	26	19	31	Ret	Ret	Ret	27	24	24	21	Ret	26	23	23	Ret	20	Ret	16	28	19	Ret	26	23	29
23	(United Kingdom) Tony Gilham																						24	Ret	Ret	NC	21	20	Ret	28	Ret	11
24	(United Kingdom) Michael Caine																18	Ret	DNS	24	DNS	DNS										9
Pos	Driver	BHI			DON			THR			OUL			CRO			SNE			KNO			ROC			SIL			BHGP			Pts

=== Independent Teams' Trophy ===
Pos	Team	BHI			DON			THR			OUL			CRO			SNE			KNO			ROC			SIL			BHGP			Pts
1	Motorbase Performance	8	4	4	1	2	10	3	1	1	10	8	8	5	6	5	3	1	5	6	6	1	2	2	5	2	1	2	11	7	1	541
2	WIX Racing	9	8	1	13	11	Ret	1	3	3	24	12	10	Ret	Ret	14	4	5	7	22	11	6	13	8	7	4	2	23	6	8	4	380
3	Speedworks Motorsport	1	18	15	3	15	19	2	13	Ret	5	5	4	9	7	3	6	7	12	4	19	12	16	DNS	20	1	3	24	14	9	6	354
4	Laser Tools Racing	12	11	9	16	9	7	22	16	22	32	Ret	20	Ret	17	Ret	23	11	8	13	10	8	11	9	9	9	9	9	8	6	2	308
5	RCIB Insurance Racing	13	17	21	19	24	13	10	14	10	13	16	9	6	20	15	12	12	11	16	13	15	18	16	8	5	12	14	15	12	8	299
6	Eurotech Racing	14	10	7	7	17	11	4	7	9	6	13	15	18	18	13	Ret	15	15	14	15	16	25	17	13	15	18	15	17	11	15	296
7	Handy Motorsport	Ret	14	11	18	10	8	14	10	7	15	Ret	16	11	12	12	13	9	3	10	12	7	20	14	Ret	3	Ret	Ret	2	Ret	14	292
8	Team BKR	7	3	8	8	3	15	20	18	19	8	17	11	10	11	8	24	21	17	26	23	18	15	7	1	6	24	19	Ret	14	20	279
9	Power Maxed Racing	Ret	15	13	15	14	12	15	23	17	11	11	19	Ret	19	Ret	15	Ret	18	7	14	11	9	11	14	13	10	13	24	17	21	247
10	AmD Tuning	Ret	23	22	21	Ret	Ret	17	21	14	26	20	25	19	15	26	19	Ret	Ret	23	Ret	19	17	13	11	14	16	17	18	15	Ret	164
11	Dextra Racing with Team Parker	Ret	24	27	20	16	22	16	19	15	30	19	14	21	25	25	Ret	20	Ret	27	18	21	23	19	17	NC	20	18	21	22	19	159
12	Maximum Motorsport	22	Ret	28	NC	25	21	19	24	20	27	21	Ret	23	21	19	21	18	21	25	17	22	21	18	22	19	19	22	25	25	22	145
13	Goodestone Racing	15	12	20	Ret	Ret	24	9	9	Ret	20	24	17	Ret	Ret	17	17	Ret	DNS	21	20	14	Ret	DNS	Ret	21	14	25	22	27	Ret	137
14	TLC Racing	24	22	Ret	22	21	17	18	22	16	28	22	21	24	24	23	18	Ret	DNS	24	DNS	DNS	24	Ret	Ret	NC	21	20	Ret	28	Ret	105
Pos	Team	BHI			DON			THR			OUL			CRO			SNE			KNO			ROC			SIL			BHGP			Pts

=== Jack Sears Trophy ===
Pos	Driver	BHI			DON			THR			OUL			CRO			SNE			KNO			ROC			SIL			BHGP			Pts
1	(United Kingdom) Ashley Sutton	4	6	10	5	13	5	Ret	15	5	19	27	12	3	5	1	25	Ret	14	11	Ret	Ret	6	5	19	EX	26	10	9	Ret	24	442
2	(United Kingdom) Michael Epps	20	17	21	19	24	13	11	14	10	25	16	Ret	14	Ret	15	20	19	20	19	Ret	20	18	Ret	23	18	12	16	16	16	25	424
3	(United Kingdom) Matt Simpson	17	18	15	Ret	22	23	13	13	Ret	22	Ret	18	22	16	Ret	22	17	Ret	Ret	19	17	Ret	DNS	20	20	Ret	24	20	19	18	345
4	(United Kingdom) Mark Howard	23	27	Ret	23	23	Ret	Ret	26	19	31	Ret	Ret	Ret	27	24	24	21	Ret	26	23	23	Ret	20	Ret	16	28	19	Ret	26	23	269
5	(United Kingdom) Kelvin Fletcher	Ret	25	Ret	24	Ret	20	Ret	23	17	29	23	22	Ret	22	Ret	Ret	Ret	18							22	22	26	24	24	21	212
6	(United Kingdom) Chris Smiley	24	22	Ret	22	21	17	18	22	16	28	22	21	24	24	23																183
7	(United Kingdom) Daniel Lloyd							12	7	9	6	13	Ret	Ret	23	13																124
Pos	Driver	BHI			DON			THR			OUL			CRO			SNE			KNO			ROC			SIL			BHGP			Pts
