= Phil Glew =

British racing driver and commentator (born 1983)

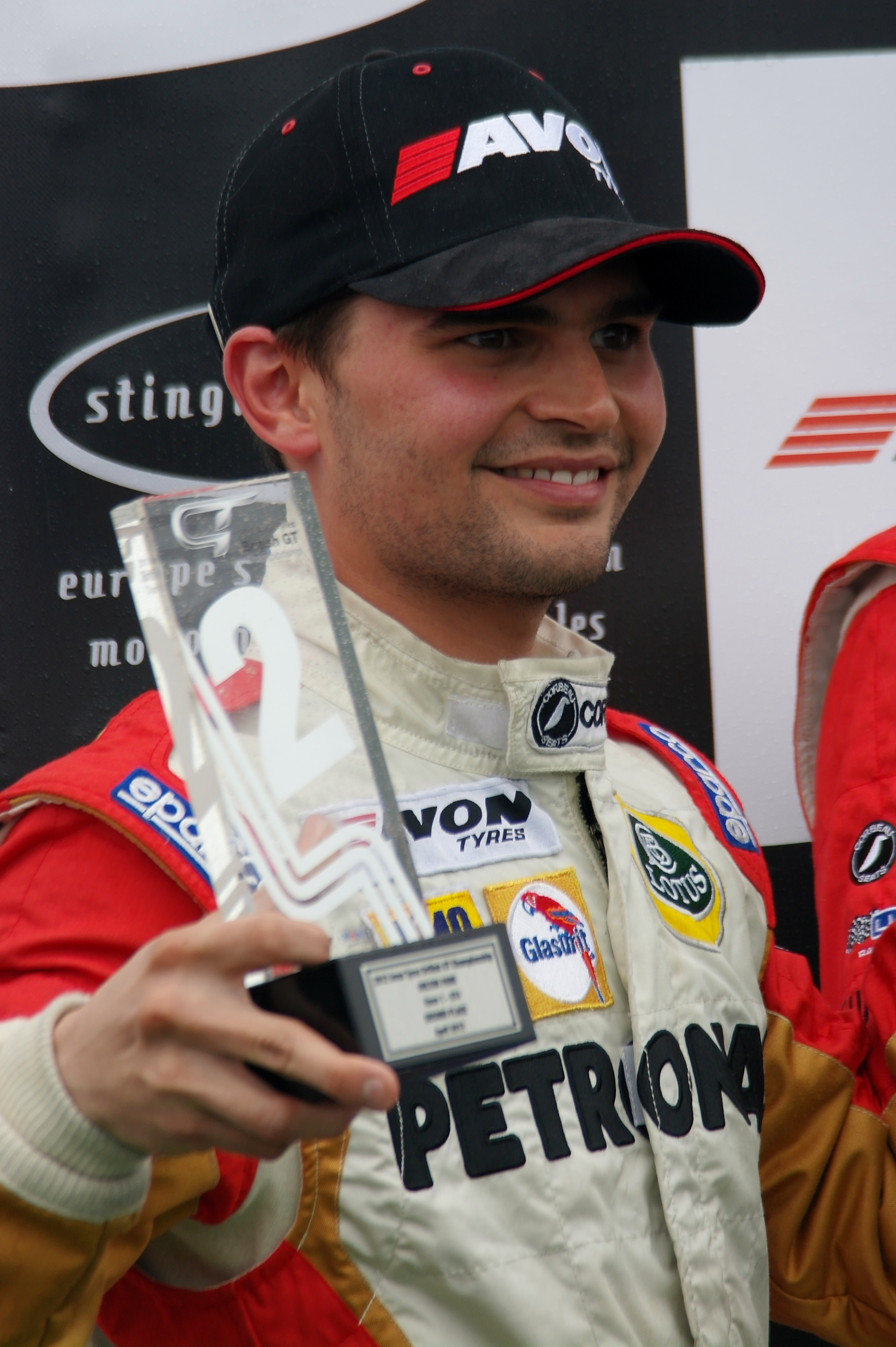
- Glew at the Oulton Park round of the 2012 British GT season
- Nationality: (United Kingdom) British
- Born: 28 June 1983 (age 43) Grimsby, England

Previous series
- 2016 2010 2008–09 2007 2007 2005 2004–05 2003 2001–03: Britcar; BTCC; Renault Clio Cup UK; Time Attack UK; Caterham CSR Masters; French Formula Renault; Formula BMW UK; British Formula Renault; Formula Ford

Championship titles
- 2009 2007: Renault Clio Cup UK; Time Attack UK

Philip James Glew (born 28 June 1983 in Grimsby) is a British racing driver. He has previously competed in the British Touring Car Championship and British GT Championship. He is currently a commentator for ITV Sport's coverage support races on the TOCA Tour.

== Racing career ==
=== Junior formulae ===
After competing in karting, Glew competed in various Formula Ford series between 2001 and 2003. In 2003 he competed in the British Formula Renault Championship, but withdrew after four rounds due to budget constraints. He competed in Formula BMW UK in 2004 and 2005, finishing as runner-up to Tim Bridgman in 2004. He competed in the British GT Championship in 2006, taking a win at Brands Hatch. In 2008, Glew began competing in the British Renault Clio Cup, taking a podium on his series debut and finishing third in the final standings. In 2009, he dominated the series, winning the first four races and ultimately taking 11 wins from 20 races.

=== British Touring Car Championship ===
Glew signed up to compete in the 2010 British Touring Car Championship for Triple 8 Race Engineering, however the decision of main sponsor Uniq not to extend their one-round deal left Glew on the sidelines after Thruxton. He returned for the Silverstone meeting in a Special Tuning UK-run SEAT León using a New Generation Touring Car (NGTC) engine.

=== British GT Championship ===
Glew returned to the British GT Championship at the Brands Hatch round of the 2011 season with Lotus Sport UK, driving their Lotus Evora GT4 car. He finished the year fifth in the GT4 category with three class victories including one at Spa-Francorchamps. He stayed with the team for 2012 season.

== Television ==
Glew joined ITV Sport in 2014 as a commentator for their coverage of the British Formula Ford Championship and the Renault Clio Cup United Kingdom.

== Racing Record ==
=== Complete British Touring Car Championship results ===
(key) (Races in bold indicate pole position – 1 point awarded in first race) (Races in italics indicate fastest lap – 1 point awarded all races) (* signifies that driver lead race for at least one lap – 1 point given)

Year	Team	Car	1	2	3	4	5	6	7	8	9	10	11	12	13	14	15	16	17	18	19	20	21	22	23	24	25	26	27	28	29	30	DC	Points
2010	Triple 8 Race Engineering	Vauxhall Vectra	THR; 1; 6	THR; 2; 7	THR; 3 Ret	ROC; 1	ROC; 2	ROC; 3	BRH; 1	BRH; 2	BRH; 3	OUL; 1	OUL; 2	OUL; 3	CRO; 1	CRO; 2	CRO; 3	SNE; 1	SNE; 2	SNE; 3													16th	9
2010	Special Tuning UK	SEAT León																			SIL; 1; 14	SIL; 2; 13	SIL; 3; 13	KNO; 1	KNO; 2	KNO; 3	DON; 1	DON; 2	DON; 3	BRH; 1	BRH; 2	BRH; 3	16th	9

=== Complete British GT Championship results ===
(key) (Races in bold indicate pole position in class) (Races in italics indicate fastest lap in class)

Year	Team	Car	Class	1	2	3	4	5	6	7	8	9	10	11	12	13	14	15	16	DC	Points
2006	RPM	Porsche 911 GT3	GTC	OUL; 1; 12	OUL; 2 Ret	DON; 15	PAU; 1; 7	PAU; 2; 7	MON; 1 Ret	MON; 2 Ret	SNE; 1	SNE; 2	ROC; 1	ROC; 2	BRH; 1; 11	BRH; 2; 5				9th	29
2006	RPM	Porsche 911 GT3-RSR	GT3														SIL; 12	MAG; 1	MAG; 2	15th	4
2011	Lotus Sport UK	Lotus Evora	GT4	OUL; 1	OUL; 2	SNE	BRH; 21	SPA; 1; 16	SPA; 2; 10	ROC; 1; 17	ROC; 2 Ret	**DON**; 13	**SIL**; 16							5th	139
2012	Lotus Sport UK	Lotus Evora	GT4	OUL; 1; 19	**OUL**; **2**; 20	NUR; 1; 21	NUR; 2; 20	ROC; Ret	BRH; Ret	SNE; 1	SNE; 2	SIL	DON							5th	71
