= Felice Tedeschi =

Italian racing driver

- Nationality: Italian
- Born: Monteleone di Spoleto, Italy

Italian GT Championship career
- Debut season: 2015
- Current team: Ombra Srl
- Car number: 46
- Starts: 2

Previous series
- 2012 2011 2003 1999-00 1998 1995 1994-97 1991 1982, 85-90: WTCC; Superstars Series; Porsche Supercup; Sports Racing World Cup; International Sports Racing Series; Spanish Touring Car Championship; Italian Superturismo Championship; International Formula 3000; Formula 3 Italy

Felice Tedeschi is an Italian racing driver currently competing in the Italian GT Championship. He is a former World Touring Car Championship driver, who made his debut in 2012.

== Racing career ==
Tedeschi began his career in 1982 in Formula Fiat Abarth. In 1984, he won the Italian Under 23 Championship in Formula Fiat Abarth. He also raced in the Italian Formula 3 for several seasons, finishing seventh in the standings in 1988, winning one race at Mugello. He raced in the Italian Superturismo Championship from 1994 to 1997, winning five races before switching to the International Sports Racing Series. In 1998, he participated in the European Prototype Championship, winning two races and becoming European team champion alongside Gianluca Giraudi. He continued to race in the series until 2000. He didn't race much after this, but did make one-off appearances in the Porsche Supercup in 2003 and in the Superstars Series in 2011. In September 2012, it was announced that Tedeschi would make his World Touring Car Championship debut with Proteam Racing driving a BMW 320 TC in the Race of the United States round held at Sonoma Raceway. However he had an accident in the first practice session, leaving his car to badly damaged, to be repaired in time for the races. In 2015, he went back to rack in GT Italian Tourismo Championship, driving a Ferrari 458. He participated in six races, earning the podium distinction in his category.

== Racing record ==
=== Complete World Touring Car Championship results ===
(key) (Races in bold indicate pole position – 1 point awarded just in first race; races in italics indicate fastest lap – 1 point awarded all races; * signifies that driver led race for at least one lap – 1 point given all races)

Year	Team	Car	1	2	3	4	5	6	7	8	9	10	11	12	13	14	15	16	17	18	19	20	21	22	23	24	DC	Pts
2012	Proteam Racing	BMW 320 TC	ITA; 1	ITA; 2	ESP; 1	ESP; 2	MAR; 1	MAR; 2	SVK; 1	SVK; 2	HUN; 1	HUN; 2	AUT; 1	AUT; 2	POR; 1	POR; 2	BRA; 1	BRA; 2	USA; 1 DNS	USA; 2 DNS	JPN; 1	JPN; 2	CHN; 1	CHN; 2	MAC; 1	MAC; 2	NC	0
