= 2012 FIA WTCC Race of the United States =

Race details
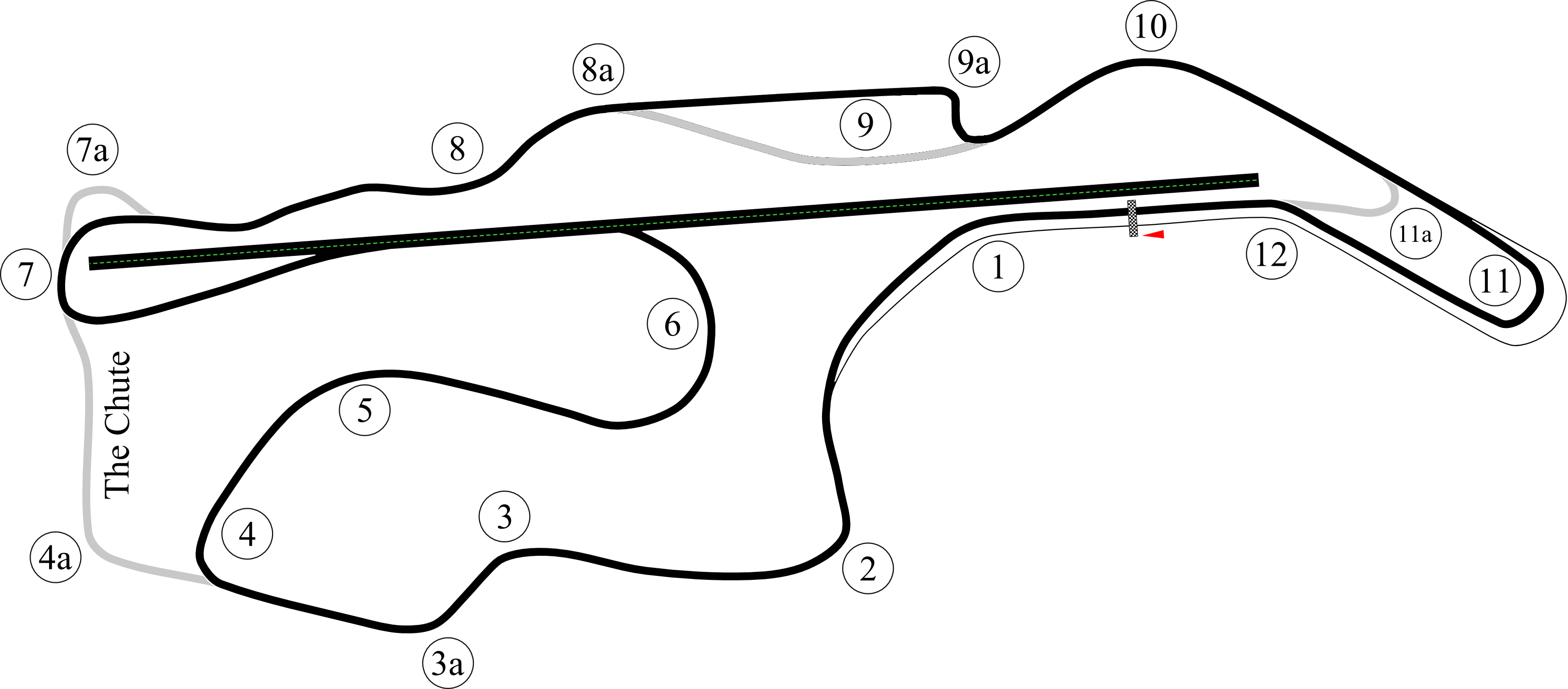
- Round 9 of 12 in the 2012 World Touring Car Championship at Sonoma Raceway in Sonoma, United States.
- Date: 23 September, 2012
- Location: Sonoma, United States
- Course: Sonoma Raceway; 4.032 kilometres (2.505 mi)

Race One
- Laps: 13
Pole position
Driver		(Switzerland) Alain Menu	Chevrolet
Time		1:45.232	
Podium
First		(France) Yvan Muller	Chevrolet
Second		(United Kingdom) Robert Huff	Chevrolet
Third		(Hungary) Norbert Michelisz	Zengő Motorsport
Fastest Lap
Driver		(France) Yvan Muller	Chevrolet
Time		1:48.088	

Race Two
- Laps: 13
Podium
First		(United Kingdom) Robert Huff	Chevrolet
Second		(Hungary) Norbert Michelisz	Zengő Motorsport
Third		(Italy) Gabriele Tarquini	Lukoil Racing Team
Fastest Lap
Driver		(France) Yvan Muller	Chevrolet
Time		1:47.732	

The 2012 FIA WTCC Race of the United States was the ninth round of the 2012 World Touring Car Championship season and the maiden running of the FIA WTCC Race of the United States. It was held on 23 September 2012 at the Sonoma Raceway in Sonoma, California, United States.

== Background ==
Coming into the event after the two-month break after Brazil, it was Yvan Muller was leading the championship 17 points ahead of his nearest rival and teammate Robert Huff. Norbert Michelisz was leading the Yokohama Independents' Trophy.

In the days leading up to the event, two new drivers were entered. Italian driver Felice Tedeschi was entered by Proteam Racing to drive the BMW 320 TC which had last been raced at Morocco in the hands of Isaac Tutumlu.

Robb Holland became the first American driver to compete in the WTCC when he filled in for the financially troubled Pasquale di Sabatino at bamboo-engineering.

== Report ==
=== Free Practice ===
Alex MacDowall set the fastest time in Friday's shortened free practice session which saw Proteam debutant Tedeschi roll his car. The accident ruled him out of the rest of the event.

Chevrolet's Yvan Muller set the fastest time in Free Practice 1 with the Ford of Tom Chilton second. Wiechers-Sport driver Stefano D'Aste had an off-track excursion late in the session, covering the track with dust which resulted caught out both Darryl O'Young and MacDowall and brought out the red flag to allow the track to be cleaned. Holland made his way out onto the track in the Chevrolet Cruze for the last five minutes having awaited the arrival of a new FIA approved helmet to arrive.

Lukoil Racing Team's Gabriele Tarquini was the fastest driver in Free Practice 2 ahead of the works Chevrolet of Muller and Tiago Monteiro's SUNRED León. Having been second fastest in the morning session, Chilton was tenth behind teammate James Nash. The fastest BMW was the Zengő Motorsport car of Michelisz in twelfth.

=== Qualifying ===
Alain Menu secured pole position for Chevrolet's home race with Tarquini second ahead of Muller and Huff. Muller was fastest at the end of the interrupted Q1 session having spent much of the session trading fastest times with SEAT driver Tarquini. Tarquini's teammate, Aleksei Dudukalo brought out the red flag when he beached his car having gone off at turn one. ROAL Motorsport's Tom Coronel missed out on Q2 having spun on his final attempt, both Team AON drivers missed out on Q2 despite having been quick in practice. It had looked like Tarquini would set the fastest time in Q2 with Muller and Huff having failed to beat his time, but Menu took pole position on his final lap at the end of the session.

=== Warm-Up ===
Muller led a Chevrolet 1-2-3 in the morning warm-up session with Tarquini the fastest non-Chevrolet runner.

=== Race One ===
The action started on the first lap with Menu defending from Tarquini and forcing the Lukoil Racing driver off the track at the second corner. Further down the field moments later there was a pileup Stefano D'Aste, Darryl O'Young, Tom Chilton, Aleksei Dudukalo, Fernando Monje and Alberto Cerqui which forced the latter three into retirement. At the front, Muller and Huff were able to pass their teammate Menu who was then forced back into the pitlane after slowing with a power steering issue. Tom Coronel and Mehdi Bennani had an eventful couple of laps when the pair collided not once but twice, the second contact forcing the Moroccan into a spin and down the order. Just two laps from the end, Pepe Oriola stalled on the pit straight where his car was protected by waved yellows until the end of the race. Muller took the win ahead of Huff and Michelisz in third.

=== Race Two ===
The reversed grid race saw D'Aste start from the pole position and he led away from the start. Bennani inherited the lead half way round the first lap when D'Aste spun off leaving three BMWs leading. Muller and Huff overtook Michelisz to take third and fourth while on the following lap, Monje crashed at turn five where his car was left for the rest of the race. The order at the front didn't change until lap four when Bennani spun on his own, handing the lead to Franz Engstler. The stranded Proteam BMW brought out the safety car two laps later, by which time Muller spun Engstler out of the lead for whiche he later earned himself a drive through penalty. The race restarted on lap eight when Coronel, continuing his charge through the field from the back of the grid, took eight place from Tom Boardman. Muller served his penalty on lap nine and Huff inherited the lead, the British driver now had to defend well from the BMW of Michelisz. On the final lap, Charles Ng was black flagged for ignoring an earlier black and orange flag for loose bodywork on his car. Huff took the win with Michelisz second and Tarquini third.

== Results ==
=== Qualifying ===
Pos.	No.	Name	Team	Car	C	Q1	Q2	Points
1	8	(Switzerland) Alain Menu	Chevrolet	Chevrolet Cruze 1.6T		1:46.182	1:45.232	**5**
2	3	(Italy) Gabriele Tarquini	Lukoil Racing	SEAT León WTCC		1:45.947	1:45.468	**4**
3	1	(France) Yvan Muller	Chevrolet	Chevrolet Cruze 1.6T		1:45.556	1:45.539	**3**
4	2	(United Kingdom) Robert Huff	Chevrolet	Chevrolet Cruze 1.6T		1:45.710	1:45.572	**2**
5	5	(Hungary) Norbert Michelisz	Zengő Motorsport	BMW 320 TC	Y	1:46.828	1:46.558	**1**
6	11	(United Kingdom) Alex MacDowall	bamboo-engineering	Chevrolet Cruze 1.6T	Y	1:46.939	1:46.578	
7	18	(Portugal) Tiago Monteiro	Tuenti Racing	SR León 1.6T		1:46.643	1:46.594	
8	6	(Germany) Franz Engstler	Liqui Moly Team Engstler	BMW 320 TC	Y	1:46.842	1:46.761	
9	25	(Morocco) Mehdi Bennani	Proteam Racing	BMW 320 TC	Y	1:46.889	1:47.004	
10	26	(Italy) **Stefano D'Aste**	Wiechers-Sport	BMW 320 TC	Y	1:46.717	1:47.263	
11	16	(Italy) Alberto Cerqui	ROAL Motorsport	BMW 320 TC	Y	1:46.976	1:47.851	
12	4	(Russia) Aleksei Dudukalo	Lukoil Racing	SEAT León WTCC	Y	1:46.976	no time	
13	14	(United Kingdom) James Nash	Team Aon	Ford Focus S2000 TC		1:47.000		
14	7	(Hong Kong) Charles Ng	Liqui Moly Team Engstler	BMW 320 TC	Y	1:47.050		
15	88	(Spain) Fernando Monje	Tuenti Racing	SEAT León WTCC	Y	1:47.149		
16	20	(China) Darryl O'Young	Special Tuning Racing	SEAT León WTCC	Y	1:47.167		
17	23	(United Kingdom) Tom Chilton	Team Aon	Ford Focus S2000 TC		1:47.380		
18	74	(Spain) Pepe Oriola	Tuenti Racing	SEAT León WTCC	Y	1:47.434		
19	22	(United Kingdom) Tom Boardman	Special Tuning Racing	SEAT León WTCC	Y	1:47.436		
20	15	(Netherlands) Tom Coronel	ROAL Motorsport	BMW 320 TC		1:47.546		
21	29	(United States) Robb Holland	bamboo-engineering	Chevrolet Cruze 1.6T	Y	1:48.179		

- **Bold** denotes Pole position for second race.

=== Race 1 ===
Pos.	No.	Name	Team	Car	C	Laps	Time/Retired	Grid	Points
1	1	(France) **Yvan Muller**	Chevrolet	Chevrolet Cruze 1.6T		13	23:34.369	3	25
2	2	(United Kingdom) Robert Huff	Chevrolet	Chevrolet Cruze 1.6T		13	+0.564	4	18
3	5	(Hungary) Norbert Michelisz	Zengő Motorsport	BMW 320 TC	Y	13	+5.444	5	15
4	3	(Italy) Gabriele Tarquini	Lukoil Racing	SEAT León WTCC		13	+8.847	2	12
5	11	(United Kingdom) Alex MacDowall	bamboo-engineering	Chevrolet Cruze 1.6T	Y	13	+11.803	6	10
6	18	(Portugal) Tiago Monteiro	Tuenti Racing	SR León 1.6T		13	+12.422	7	8
7	6	(Germany) Franz Engstler	Liqui Moly Team Engstler	BMW 320 TC	Y	13	+15.707	8	6
8	15	(Netherlands) Tom Coronel	ROAL Motorsport	BMW 320 TC		13	+16.341	20	4
9	26	(Italy) Stefano D'Aste	Wiechers-Sport	BMW 320 TC	Y	13	+17.304	10	2
10	22	(United Kingdom) Tom Boardman	Special Tuning Racing	SEAT León WTCC	Y	13	+25.823	19	1
11	25	(Morocco) Mehdi Bennani	Proteam Racing	BMW 320 TC	Y	13	+30.314	9	
12	23	(United Kingdom) Tom Chilton	Team Aon	Ford Focus S2000 TC		13	+34.388	17	
13	29	(United States) Robb Holland	bamboo-engineering	Chevrolet Cruze 1.6T	Y	13	+40.092	21	
14	20	(China) Darryl O'Young	Special Tuning Racing	SEAT León WTCC	Y	13	+46.184	16	
15	7	(Hong Kong) Charles Ng	Liqui Moly Team Engstler	BMW 320 TC	Y	13	+47.864	14	
16	74	(Spain) Pepe Oriola	Tuenti Racing	SEAT León WTCC	Y	10	+3 Laps	18	
17	14	(United Kingdom) James Nash	Team Aon	Ford Focus S2000 TC		9	+4 Laps	13	
18	8	(Switzerland) Alain Menu	Chevrolet	Chevrolet Cruze 1.6T		9	+4 Laps	1	
NC	88	(Spain) Fernando Monje	Tuenti Racing	SEAT León WTCC	Y	8	+5 Laps	15	
Ret	16	(Italy) Alberto Cerqui	ROAL Motorsport	BMW 320 TC	Y	1	Collision	11	
Ret	4	(Russia) Aleksei Dudukalo	Lukoil Racing	SEAT León WTCC	Y	0	Collision	12	

- **Bold** denotes Fastest lap.

=== Race 2 ===
Pos.	No.	Name	Team	Car	C	Laps	Time/Retired	Grid	Points
1	2	(United Kingdom) Robert Huff	Chevrolet	Chevrolet Cruze 1.6T		15	29:19.176	7	25
2	5	(Hungary) Norbert Michelisz	Zengő Motorsport	BMW 320 TC	Y	15	+0.320	6	18
3	3	(Italy) Gabriele Tarquini	Lukoil Racing	SEAT León WTCC		15	+1.199	9	15
4	8	(Switzerland) Alain Menu	Chevrolet	Chevrolet Cruze 1.6T		15	+3.718	10	12
5	15	(Netherlands) Tom Coronel	ROAL Motorsport	BMW 320 TC		15	+7.571	18	10
6	18	(Portugal) Tiago Monteiro	Tuenti Racing	SR León 1.6T		15	+8.207	4	8
7	11	(United Kingdom) Alex MacDowall	bamboo-engineering	Chevrolet Cruze 1.6T	Y	15	+12.682	5	6
8	22	(United Kingdom) Tom Boardman	Special Tuning Racing	SEAT León WTCC	Y	15	+13.847	17	4
9	26	(Italy) Stefano D'Aste	Wiechers-Sport	BMW 320 TC	Y	15	+14.220	1	2
10	6	(Germany) Franz Engstler	Liqui Moly Team Engstler	BMW 320 TC	Y	15	+15.643	3	1
11	74	(Spain) Pepe Oriola	Tuenti Racing	SEAT León WTCC	Y	15	+18.811	21	
12	20	(China) Darryl O'Young	Special Tuning Racing	SEAT León WTCC	Y	15	+21.656	15	
13	16	(Italy) Alberto Cerqui	ROAL Motorsport	BMW 320 TC	Y	15	+21.997	11	
14	1	(France) **Yvan Muller**	Chevrolet	Chevrolet Cruze 1.6T		15	+23.467	8	
15	23	(United Kingdom) Tom Chilton	Team Aon	Ford Focus S2000 TC		15	+24.319	16	
16	29	(United States) Robb Holland	bamboo-engineering	Chevrolet Cruze 1.6T	Y	15	+25.184	19	
17	14	(United Kingdom) James Nash	Team Aon	Ford Focus S2000 TC		15	+30.630	20	
18	4	(Russia) Aleksei Dudukalo	Lukoil Racing	SEAT León WTCC	Y	15	+41.557	12	
Ret	25	(Morocco) Mehdi Bennani	Proteam Racing	BMW 320 TC	Y	3	Collision	2	
Ret	88	(Spain) Fernando Monje	Tuenti Racing	SEAT León WTCC	Y	1	Collision	14	
DSQ	7	(Hong Kong) Charles Ng	Liqui Moly Team Engstler	BMW 320 TC	Y	15	Disqualified	13	

- **Bold** denotes Fastest lap.

== Standings after the race ==
Drivers' Championship standings

Pos	Driver	Points
1	(France) Yvan Muller	315
2	(United Kingdom) Robert Huff	315
3	(Switzerland) Alain Menu	267
4	(Italy) Gabriele Tarquini	193
5	(Netherlands) Tom Coronel	164

Yokohama Independents' Trophy standings

Pos	Driver	Points
1	(Hungary) Norbert Michelisz	134
2	(Spain) Pepe Oriola	109
3	(Italy) Stefano D'Aste	85
4	(United Kingdom) Alex MacDowall	79
5	(Germany) Franz Engstler	68

Manufacturers' Championship standings

Pos	Manufacturer	Points
1	(United States) Chevrolet	761
2	(Germany) BMW Customer Racing Teams	486
3	(Spain) SEAT Racing Technology	472

- Note: Only the top five positions are included for both sets of drivers' standings.
