= Charles Ng (racing driver) =

Hong Kong racing driver

- 伍家麒 (Ng Ka-Ki)
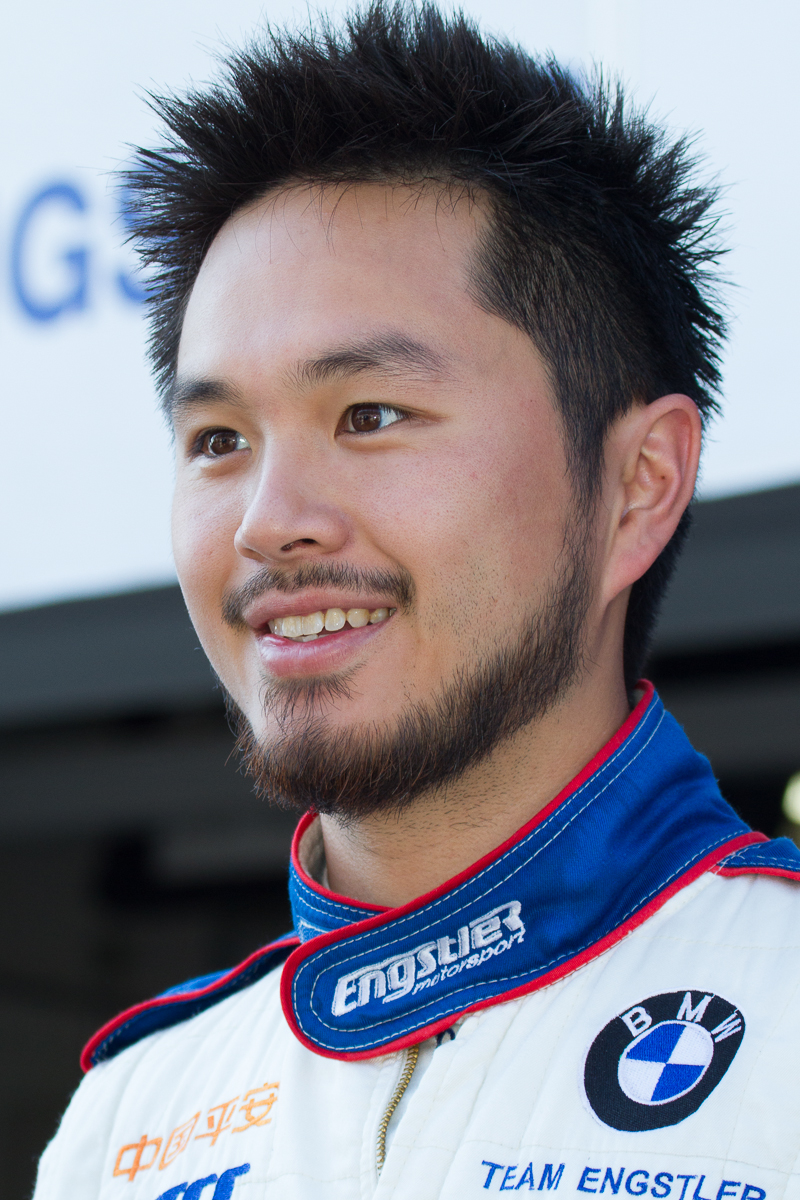
- Ng at the 2012 FIA WTCC Race of Japan.
- Born: August 1, 1984 (age 42); British Hong Kong
- Occupations: Race car driver
- Car number: 7
- Starts: 0
- Wins: 0
- Poles: 0
- Fastest laps: 0

Previous series
- 2011–13 2010–11 2010 2008–09: WTCC; Formula D Asian Touring Car Championship; Skip Barber Mazdaspeed West

Championship titles
- 2010 2009: Asian Touring Car Championship; Skip Barber Mazdaspeed West

Charles Ka-Ki Ng (Chinese: 伍家麒, born August 1, 1984) is a professional racing driver from Hong Kong.

== Racing career ==
=== Early racing ===
Started racing at the late age of 24, Ng won the Asian Touring Car Championship in 2010 in his rookie season. Prior to that he won the 2008/09 Skip Barber MAZDASPEED Challenge West Championship, as well as being Rookie of the Year in the series and track record holder of the MX-5 Cup car.

=== Formula Drift ===
Ng competed professionally in the Formula D Pro Championship drifting series in the United States, and took second place for Rookie of the Year in 2010 with best finishes of top-eight. In 2011, Ng drove for Evasive Motorsports and his best finish was a top-16.

=== Endurance Racing ===
In 2012, aside from World Touring Car Championship, Ng also competed in the VLN endurance championship at Nürburgring Nordschleife and he won the class at the 24 Hours of Zolder for Yokohama Belgium and Skylimitevents in a Porsche 996 GT3 Cup.

=== World Touring Car Championship ===
==== Engstler Motorsport (2011–2013) ====
Ng made his debut in the World Touring Car Championship at the 2011 FIA WTCC Race of Japan, driving a naturally aspirated BMW 320si for Liqui Moly Team Engstler. Ng then drove a turbocharged BMW 320 TC for the remaining rounds of the season and scored his first championship point on his first outing in race two of the Race of China. He finished the year 22nd in the drivers' standings.

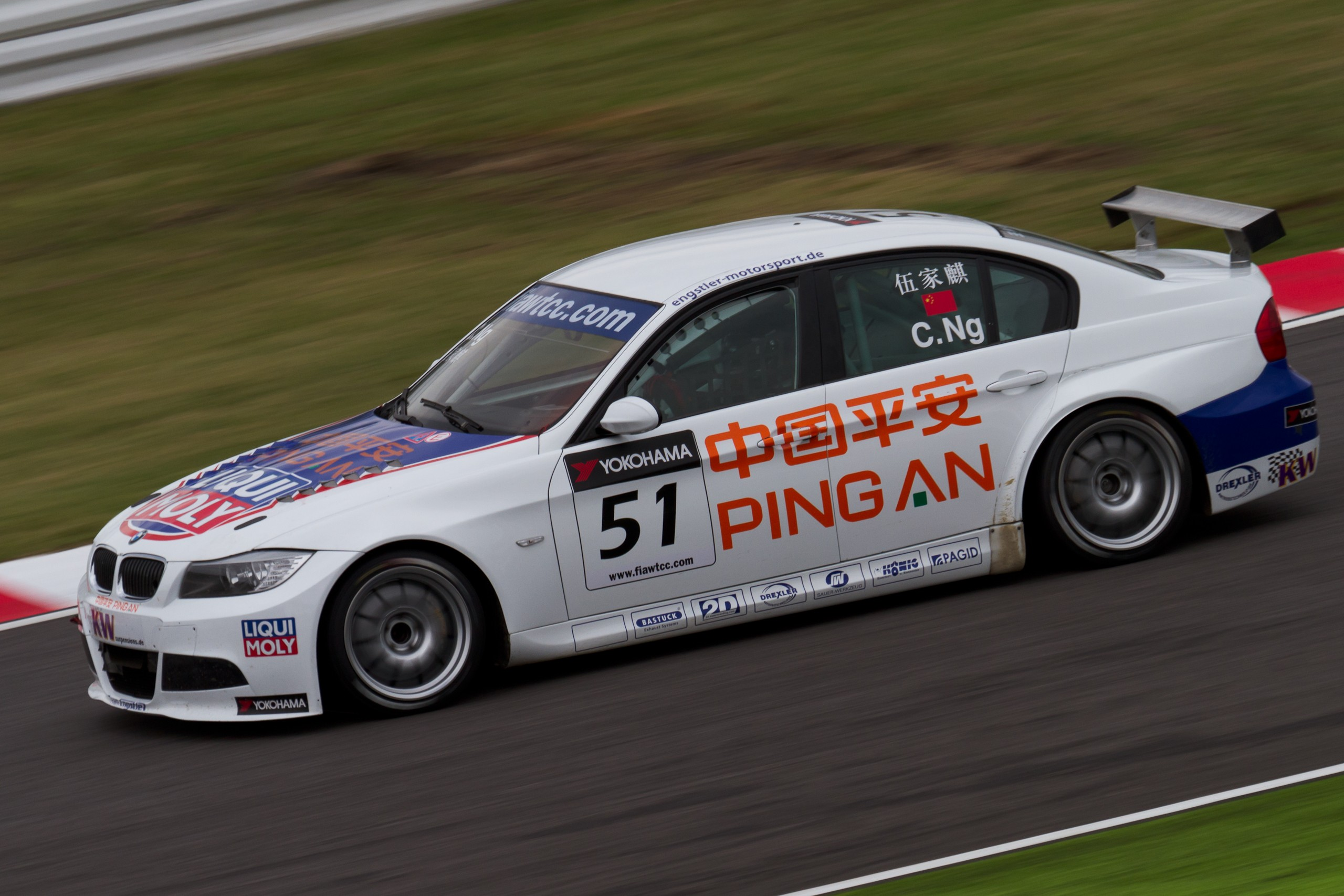
Ng driving the Team Engstler BMW 320si at Suzuka during the 2011 World Touring Car Championship season.

In 2012, Ng drove full-time alongside Franz Engstler at the latter's BMW team. He had to be black flagged during the second free practice session for the Race of Spain after getting stuck in a gravel trap and then continuing after receiving assistance from the marshals. At the Race of Morocco, he was forced to retire due to a broken water pump belt when he was fighting for 11th place in race one. During race two of the Race of the United States, the rear bumper on Ng's car came loose when he was fighting for 11th place and he was issued with a black and orange flag ordering him to return to the pits for repairs. He ignored this and a black flag was put out, disqualifying him from the race. He picked up his first point of the season at the Race of China, finishing tenth in race one. Ng was classified 25th in the drivers' championship in his first full season.

Team Engstler continued to run Ng alongside team owner Franz Engstler in the 2013 season. At the end of the season he was classified 18th in the driver's championship, his best finish in the series.

== Racing record ==
=== Complete World Touring Car Championship results ===
(key) (Races in bold indicate pole position) (Races in italics indicate fastest lap)

Year	Team	Car	1	2	3	4	5	6	7	8	9	10	11	12	13	14	15	16	17	18	19	20	21	22	23	24	DC	Points
2011	Liqui Moly Team Engstler	BMW 320si	BRA; 1	BRA; 2	BEL; 1	BEL; 2	ITA; 1	ITA; 2	HUN; 1	HUN; 2	CZE; 1	CZE; 2	POR; 1	POR; 2	GBR; 1	GBR; 2	GER; 1	GER; 2	ESP; 1	ESP; 2	JPN; 1; 14	JPN; 2; 19					22nd	1
2011	DeTeam KK Motorsport	BMW 320 TC																					CHN; 1; 16	CHN; 2; 10	MAC; 1; 13	MAC; 2; 14	22nd	1
2012	Liqui Moly Team Engstler	BMW 320 TC	ITA; 1; 15	ITA; 2 Ret	ESP; 1; 18	ESP; 2; 19	MAR; 1 Ret	MAR; 2; 13	SVK; 1; 15	SVK; 2 DNS	HUN; 1; 16	HUN; 2 Ret	AUT; 1; 14	AUT; 2; 13	POR; 1; 18	POR; 2; 14	BRA; 1; 13	BRA; 2 Ret	USA; 1; 15	USA; 2 DSQ	JPN; 1; 22	JPN; 2; 17	CHN; 1; 10	CHN; 2; 23	MAC; 1 Ret	MAC; 2 Ret	25th	1
2013	Liqui Moly Team Engstler	BMW 320 TC	ITA; 1; 15	ITA; 2; 17	MAR; 1; 14	MAR; 2; 10	SVK; 1; 18	SVK; 2 Ret	HUN; 1; 15	HUN; 2; 14	AUT; 1; 18	AUT; 2; 19	RUS; 1 Ret	RUS; 2 Ret	POR; 1; 14	POR; 2; 15	ARG; 1; 17	ARG; 2; 19	USA; 1; 16	USA; 2 Ret	JPN; 1; 14	JPN; 2; 7	CHN; 1; 27	CHN; 2; 16	MAC; 1; 28†	MAC; 2 Ret	18th	7
