= 2012 World Touring Car Championship =

Motorsport contest

Champions
- World Drivers' Champion: Robert Huff
- World Manufacturers' Champion: Chevrolet

Seasons
- ← 2011 2013 →

The 2012 World Touring Car Championship season was the ninth season of the FIA World Touring Car Championship, and the eighth since its 2005 return. The championship, which was open to Super 2000 cars, began with the Race of Italy at Monza on 11 March and ended with the Guia Race of Macau at the Guia Circuit on 18 November, after twenty-four races. Robert Huff won the Drivers' Championship and Chevrolet won the Manufacturers' Championship.

== Teams and drivers ==
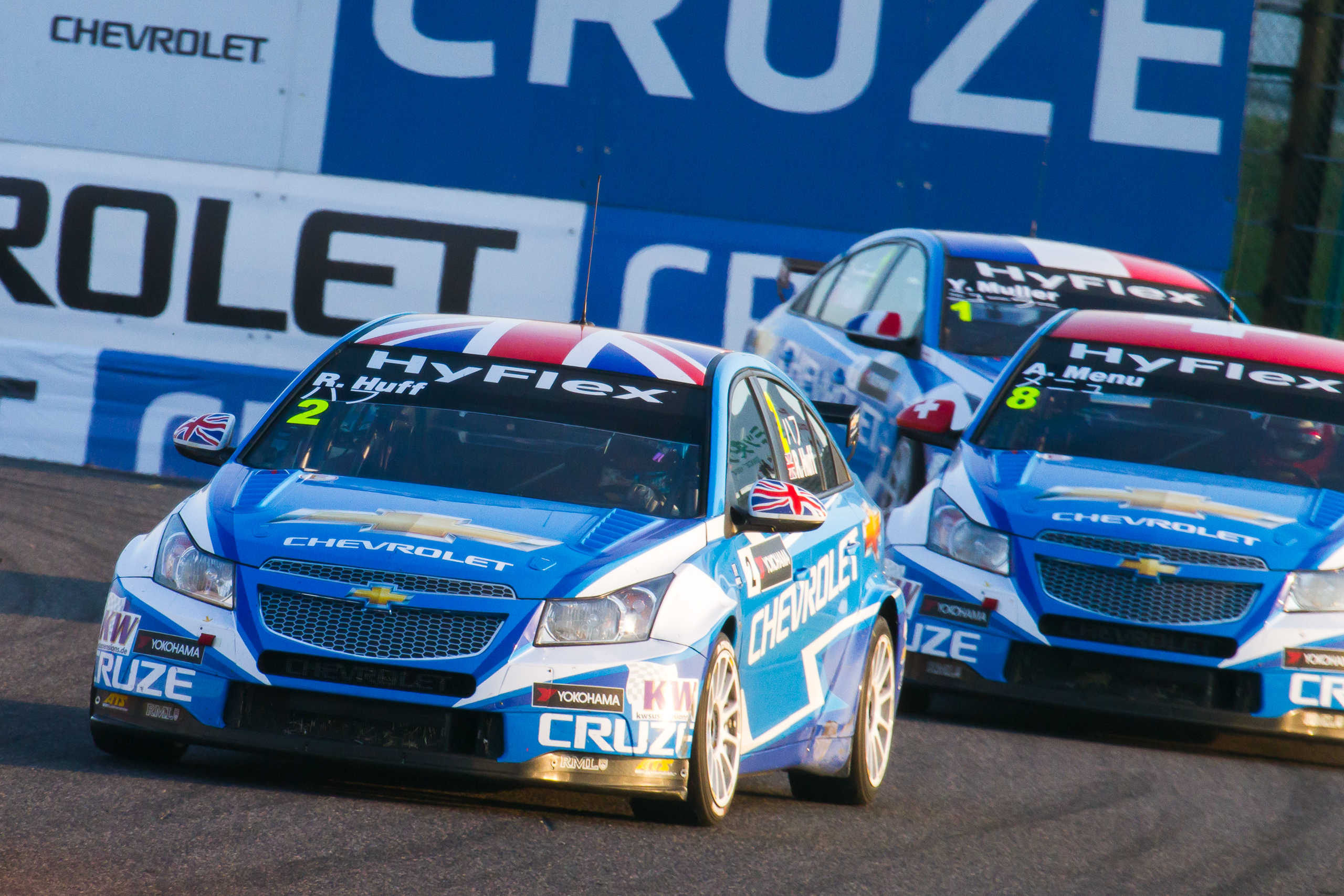
Robert Huff won the Drivers' Championship

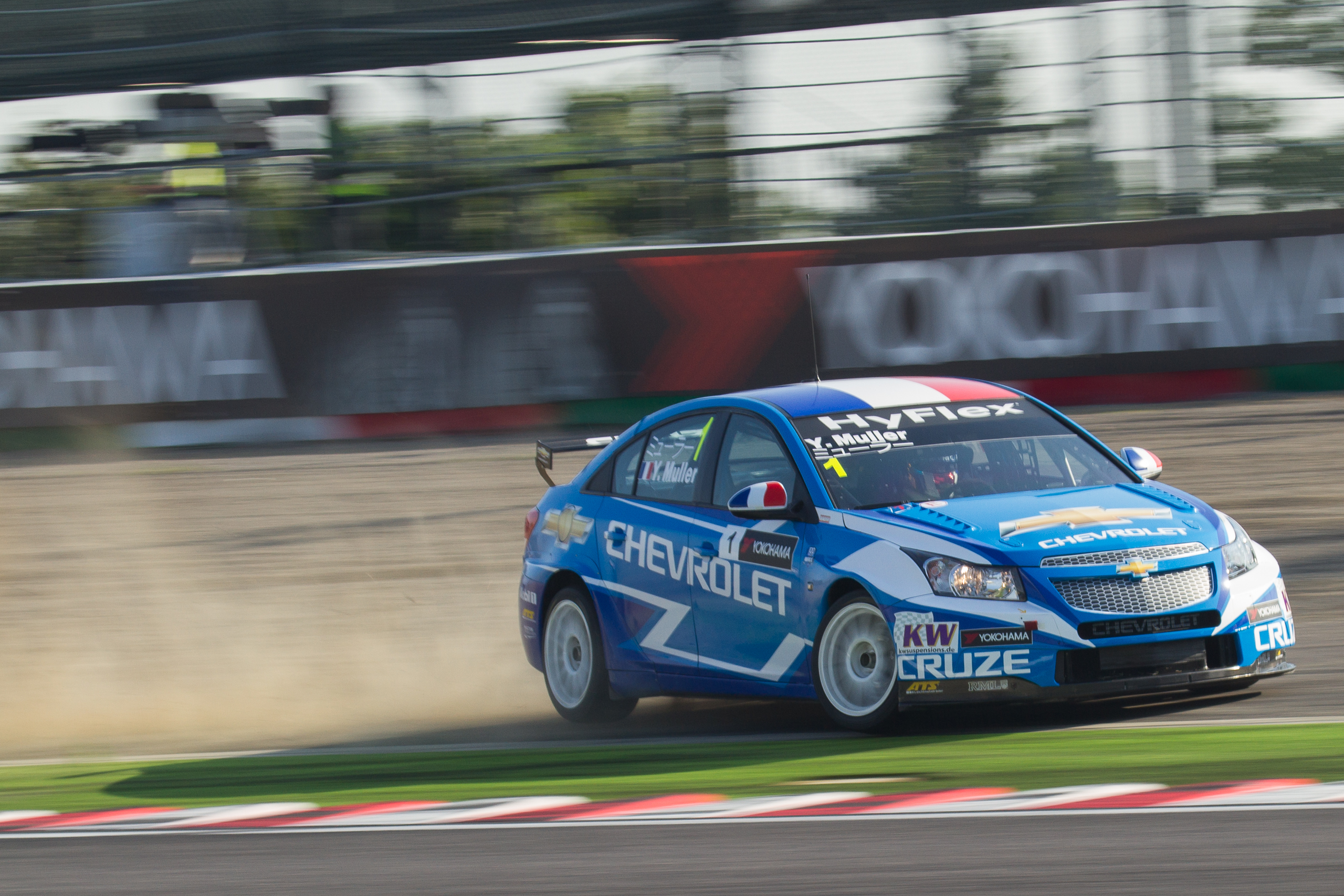
Yvan Muller placed third in the Drivers' Championship

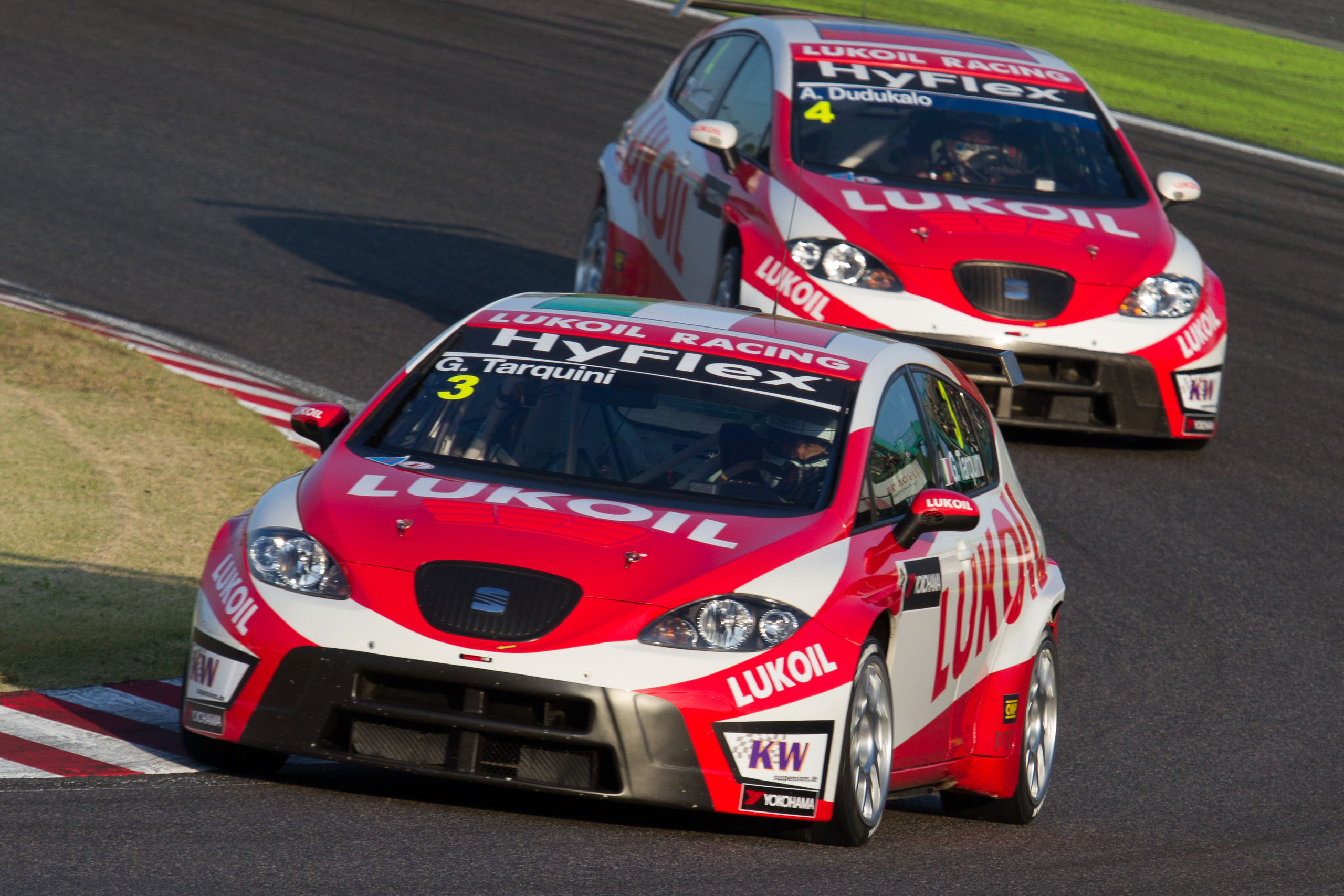
Gabriele Tarquini placed fourth in the Drivers' Championship

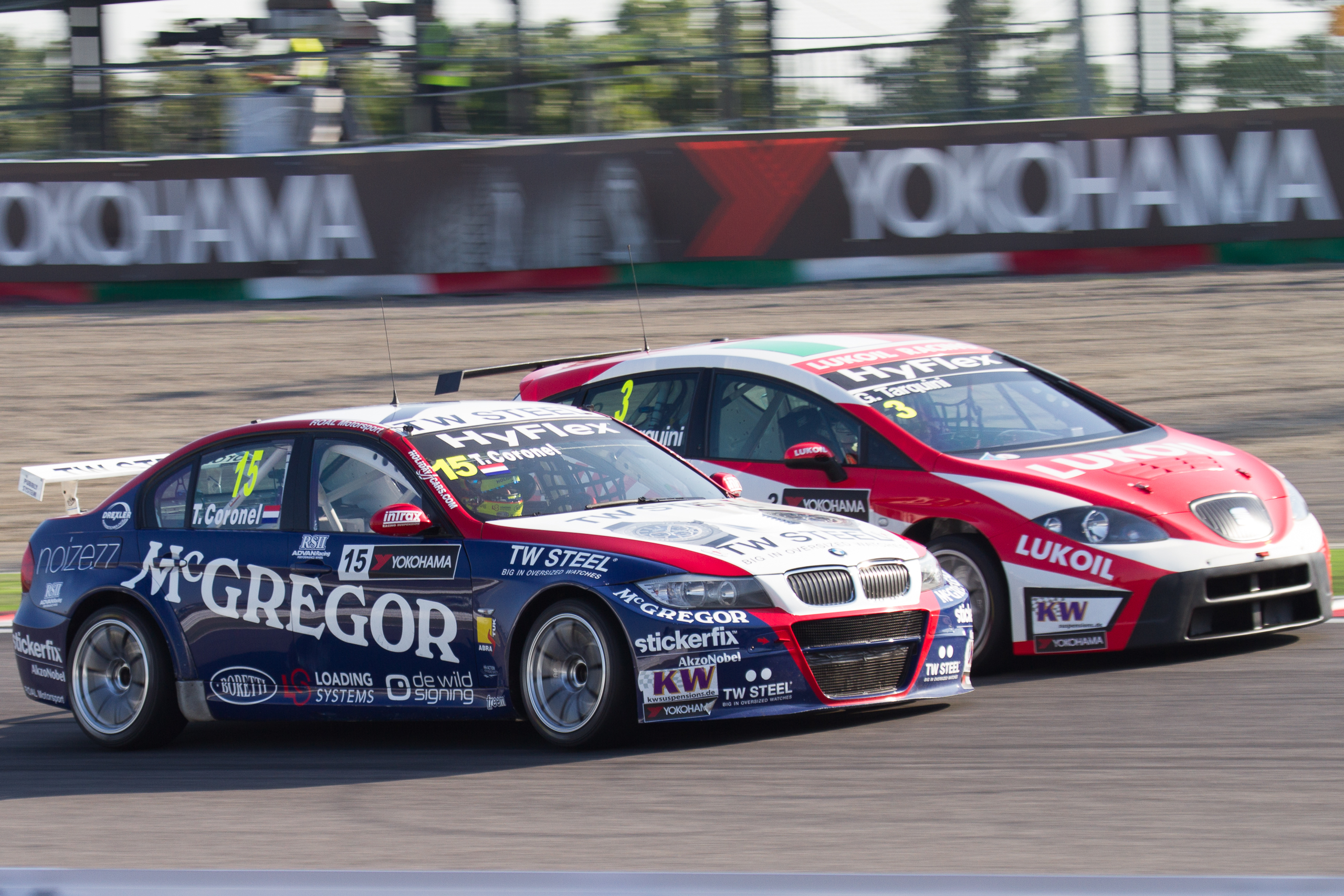
Tom Coronel placed fifth in the Drivers' Championship

The following teams and drivers contested the 2012 FIA World Touring Car Championship.

Team	Car	No.	Drivers	Rounds
Manufacturer Teams
(United Kingdom) Chevrolet	Chevrolet Cruze 1.6T	1	(France) Yvan Muller	All
(United Kingdom) Chevrolet	Chevrolet Cruze 1.6T	2	(United Kingdom) Robert Huff	All
(United Kingdom) Chevrolet	Chevrolet Cruze 1.6T	8	(Switzerland) Alain Menu	All
Chevrolet Motorsport Sweden	Chevrolet Cruze 1.6T	9	(Sweden) Rickard Rydell	1
(United Kingdom) Team Aviva-COFCO	Chevrolet Cruze 1.6T	32	(United Kingdom) Colin Turkington	11
(Russia) Lukoil Racing Team	SEAT León 1.6 TSI WTCC	3	(Italy) Gabriele Tarquini	All
(United Kingdom) Team Aon	Ford Focus S2000 TC	14	(United Kingdom) James Nash	All
(United Kingdom) Team Aon	Ford Focus S2000 TC	23	(United Kingdom) Tom Chilton	All
(Italy) ROAL Motorsport	BMW 320 TC	15	(Netherlands) Tom Coronel	All
(Spain) Tuenti Racing Team	SEAT León 2.0 TDI	18	(Portugal) Tiago Monteiro	1
(Spain) Tuenti Racing Team	SUNRED SR León 1.6T	18	(Portugal) Tiago Monteiro	2–9
(Japan) Honda Racing Team JAS	Honda Civic S2000 TC	18	(Portugal) Tiago Monteiro	10–12
Yokohama Trophy
(Russia) Lukoil Racing Team	SEAT León WTCC	4	(Russia) Aleksei Dudukalo	All
(Hungary) Zengő Motorsport	BMW 320 TC	5	(Hungary) Norbert Michelisz	All
(Hungary) Zengő Motorsport	BMW 320 TC	27	(Hungary) Gábor Wéber	1–2, 4–7
(Germany) Liqui Moly Team Engstler	BMW 320 TC	6	(Germany) Franz Engstler	All
(Germany) Liqui Moly Team Engstler	BMW 320 TC	7	(Hong Kong) Charles Ng	All
(Hong Kong) bamboo-engineering	Chevrolet Cruze 1.6T	11	(United Kingdom) Alex MacDowall	All
(Hong Kong) bamboo-engineering	Chevrolet Cruze 1.6T	12	(Italy) Pasquale Di Sabatino	1–7
(Hong Kong) bamboo-engineering	Chevrolet Cruze 1.6T	17	(Denmark) Michel Nykjær	8
(Hong Kong) bamboo-engineering	Chevrolet Cruze 1.6T	20	(Hong Kong) Darryl O'Young	10–12
(Hong Kong) bamboo-engineering	Chevrolet Cruze 1.6T	29	(United States) Robb Holland	9
(Italy) ROAL Motorsport	BMW 320 TC	16	(Italy) Alberto Cerqui	1–11
(Italy) ROAL Motorsport	BMW 320 TC	46	(Japan) Kei Cozzolino	12
(United Kingdom) Special Tuning Racing	SEAT León 1.6 TSI WTCC	20	(Hong Kong) Darryl O'Young	1–9
(United Kingdom) Special Tuning Racing	SEAT León 1.6 TSI WTCC	38	(Germany) René Münnich	10
(United Kingdom) Special Tuning Racing	SEAT León 1.6 TSI WTCC	22	(United Kingdom) Tom Boardman	7–12
(United Kingdom) Special Tuning Racing	SEAT León 2.0 TDI	22	(United Kingdom) Tom Boardman	2–6
(Italy) Proteam Racing	BMW 320 TC	24	(Spain) Isaac Tutumlu	1–3
(Italy) Proteam Racing	BMW 320 TC	25	(Morocco) Mehdi Bennani	All
(Italy) Proteam Racing	BMW 320 TC	48	(Italy) Felice Tedeschi	9
(Germany) Wiechers-Sport	BMW 320 TC	26	(Italy) Stefano D'Aste	All
(Spain) SUNRED Engineering	SEAT León 2.0 TDI	40	(Belgium) Andrea Barlesi	1
(Spain) SUNRED Engineering	SUNRED SR León 1.6T	40	(Belgium) Andrea Barlesi	2–3
(Spain) SUNRED Engineering	SUNRED SR León 1.6T	60	(France) Hugo Valente	11
(Spain) SUNRED Engineering	SUNRED SR León 1.6T	88	(Spain) Fernando Monje	2
(Spain) Tuenti Racing Team	SEAT León 1.6 TSI WTCC	88	(Spain) Fernando Monje	8–12
(Spain) Tuenti Racing Team	SEAT León 1.6 TSI WTCC	74	(Spain) Pepe Oriola	All
(Switzerland) SEAT Swiss Racing by SUNRED	SEAT León 1.6 TSI WTCC	73	(Switzerland) Fredy Barth	11–12
Asian Wild Cards
China Dragon Racing	Chevrolet Lacetti	50	(Macau) Felipe De Souza	11–12
China Dragon Racing	Chevrolet Lacetti	55	(Macau) Célio Alves Dias	12
China Dragon Racing	Chevrolet Cruze LT	51	(Macau) Kin Veng Ng	11–12
(Macau) Son Veng Racing Team	Honda Accord Euro R	53	(Macau) Kelvin Leong	11
(Hong Kong) Look Fong Racing Team	Chevrolet Cruze LT	54	(Hong Kong) Eric Kwong	11
(Spain) Tuenti Racing Team	SUNRED SR León 1.6T	66	(Macau) Andre Couto	12
(Spain) Tuenti Racing Team	SUNRED SR León 1.6T	80	(Japan) Hiroki Yoshimoto	10
(Germany) Liqui Moly Team Engstler	BMW 320si	75	(Japan) Masaki Kano	10
(Germany) Liqui Moly Team Engstler	BMW 320si	76	(Macau) Alex Liu	11
(Germany) Liqui Moly Team Engstler	BMW 320si	77	(Macau) Jo Merszei	12
(Macau) RPM Racing Team	BMW 320si	78	(Macau) Mak Ka Lok	12
(Macau) Five Auto Racing Team	Honda Accord Euro R	81	(Macau) Eurico de Jesus	12
(Macau) Five Auto Racing Team	BMW 320si	82	(Macau) Henry Ho	12
Guest Drivers
(Russia) TMS Sport	Lada Granta 1.6T WTCC	69	(United Kingdom) James Thompson	5, 7

=== Driver changes ===
Changed Teams

- Darryl O'Young moved from Bamboo Engineering to join Special Tuning Racing. However, in the tenth round of the championship, he re-joined Bamboo Engineering for the remainder of the season, taking over Pasquale Di Sabatino's car, after Di Sabbitino had been replaced by Michel Nykjær and Robb Holland for the previous two rounds in the championship.
- Michel Nykjær left the series to join Rickard Rydell in the Scandinavian Touring Car Championship with Chevrolet Motorsport Sweden. However at Curitiba he replaced Pasquale Di Sabatino at Bamboo Engineering.

Entering/Re-Entering WTCC

- Former Formula Le Mans champion Andrea Barlesi will join the series with Sunred Engineering. He will be joined by former European F3 Open driver Fernando Monje.
- Tom Boardman will enter the series for his first full season campaign since 2009.
- Italian Superstars Series champion Alberto Cerqui will enter the series with ROAL Motorsport.
- Tom Chilton and James Nash will enter the series with Arena Motorsport.
- Pasquale Di Sabatino and Alex MacDowall will join the series with Bamboo Engineering, from Auto GP and the British Touring Car Championship respectively.
- James Thompson will return at selected races with TMS Sport.
- Gábor Wéber will enter the series with the Zengő Motorsport team, partnering countryman Norbert Michelisz.
- 2011 STCC champion Rickard Rydell returned to the series with Chevrolet Motorsport Sweden for one-off at Monza.
- After competing in one-off events, Charles Ng will participate full-time with Engstler Motorsport.
- Robb Holland joined Bamboo Engineering for the Sonoma round of the championship.

Leaving WTCC, excluding single-entry drivers

- Robert Dahlgren left the series to join Polestar Racing in the TTA Racing Elite League.
- 2011 Yokohama trophy winner Kristian Poulsen announced that he was to retire from motor racing.
- Fredy Barth left the series due to financial reasons.
- Fabio Fabiani and Urs Sonderegger are competing in the European Touring Car Cup.
- Yukinori Taniguchi was left with no drive for the 2012 season.
- Javier Villa was expected to be driving the second Proteam BMW car, but due to sponsorship issues he was left without a drive, and switched to the Racecar Euro Series.

== Calendar ==
Each meeting consists of two races of approx 50 km each.

Round		Race Name	Track	Date
1	R1	HyFlex Race of Italy	(Italy) Autodromo Nazionale di Monza	11 March
1	R2	HyFlex Race of Italy	(Italy) Autodromo Nazionale di Monza	11 March
2	R3	interwetten.com Race of Spain	(Spain) Circuit Ricardo Tormo	1 April
2	R4	interwetten.com Race of Spain	(Spain) Circuit Ricardo Tormo	1 April
3	R5	Race of Morocco	(Morocco) Marrakech Street Circuit	15 April
3	R6	Race of Morocco	(Morocco) Marrakech Street Circuit	15 April
4	R7	Race of Slovakia	Automotodróm Slovakia Ring	29 April
4	R8	Race of Slovakia	Automotodróm Slovakia Ring	29 April
5	R9	Race of Hungary	(Hungary) Hungaroring	6 May
5	R10	Race of Hungary	(Hungary) Hungaroring	6 May
6	R11	bet-at-home.com Race of Austria	(Austria) Salzburgring	20 May
6	R12	bet-at-home.com Race of Austria	(Austria) Salzburgring	20 May
7	R13	Euronics Race of Portugal	(Portugal) Autódromo Internacional do Algarve	3 June
7	R14	Euronics Race of Portugal	(Portugal) Autódromo Internacional do Algarve	3 June
8	R15	PDVSA Race of Brazil	(Brazil) Autódromo Internacional de Curitiba	22 July
8	R16	PDVSA Race of Brazil	(Brazil) Autódromo Internacional de Curitiba	22 July
9	R17	Race of USA	(United States) Sonoma Raceway	23 September
9	R18	Race of USA	(United States) Sonoma Raceway	23 September
10	R19	JVC Kenwood Race of Japan	(Japan) Suzuka Circuit	21 October
10	R20	JVC Kenwood Race of Japan	(Japan) Suzuka Circuit	21 October
11	R21	Race of China	(China) Shanghai International Circuit	4 November
11	R22	Race of China	(China) Shanghai International Circuit	4 November
12	R23	Race of Macau	(Macau) Guia Circuit	18 November
12	R24	Race of Macau	(Macau) Guia Circuit	18 November

=== Calendar changes ===
Numerous changes have been made to the 2012 calendar:

- The Race of Austria will make its debut in 2012 at the Salzburgring.
- The Race of Belgium, Race of UK, Race of Germany and the Race of the Czech Republic have all been discontinued.
- The Race of Brazil will not be the opening round of the season for the first time since its debut in 2006.
- The Race of China will move from the Shanghai Tianma Circuit to the Shanghai International Circuit.
- The Race of Italy will become the season opening event, with the Race of Spain being brought forward to an April date.
- The Race of Morocco returns to the calendar after a one-year absence.
- The Race of Slovakia will make its debut in 2012 at the Slovakiaring, replacing the proposed Race of Argentina.
- The Race of Portugal will return at Portimão, switching from Porto the previous season and Estoril as it was initially planned.
- The Race of the United States will make its debut in 2012 at Sonoma Raceway in the aforementioned California city. The circuit was the full layout except for the motorcycle chicane in Turn 10.

== Season report ==
=== Round One – Italy ===
Having dominated the previous season, and still being the only factory-supported team in 2012, the factory Chevrolets were expected to dominate qualifying, but instead it was Gabriele Tarquini in his Lukoil SEAT who took a surprising pole position. The leading Chevrolet of defending champion Yvan Muller was second, only six-hundredths behind Tarquini, with his teammates Robert Huff and Alain Menu on the second row. Rickard Rydell, in a one-off outing, took fifth in a fourth Chevrolet supplied by Chevrolet Motorsport Sweden. Pepe Oriola took pole in the Yokohama class by qualifying seventh.

The standing start for Race 1 saw no incidents in the first chicane, but that was not the case later in the lap as Huff and Menu touched while battling for third, and went into the gravel. Both drivers lost out, Huff dropping to sixth and Menu well outside the top ten. Tarquini and Muller soon began a battle for the lead, which eventually ended up in Muller's favour after Tarquini made a mistake on lap 4. Rydell ran third briefly, but was passed by a recovering Huff mid-race, and the Brit then passed Tarquini as the latter struggled with fading tyres. Muller started off his title defence with a win ahead of Huff, Tarquini and Rydell. Sixth place was enough for Pepe Oriola to win the Yokohama trophy.

Aleksei Dudukalo and Oriola, who were supposed to start second and fourth in the reverse-grid Race 2, both suffered problems before the race began, the former did not even start whereas the latter started from the pitlane. Norbert Michelisz led away at the start, ahead of Tom Coronel and Stefano D'Aste. The Chevrolet trio were battling for fifth at the start of lap 2 when Huff tagged Muller at the first chicane, sending him into a spin. Muller went backwards through the chicane but was able to correct it and not lose any places; Tarquini came out the big loser in this having to retire after hitting Huff. After this incident, the Chevrolets then closed in on the lead BMWs and picked them off one by one. Leader Norbert Michelisz made a better fight for his position and kept Muller at bay repeatedly until he hit a pigeon with three laps left. Michelisz lost straight-line speed as a result and was passed by Muller later that lap, Menu and Huff soon followed. The Chevrolets held station after that, with Muller making it a double, whereas Michelisz had lost so much pace that he was also passed by Stefano D'Aste who took the Yokohama trophy.

=== Round Two – Spain ===
Fresh from his double victory at Monza, defending champion Yvan Muller continued his form by taking pole by a comfortable margin. Gabriele Tarquini qualified second in his SEAT, with Tom Coronel making it three manufacturers in the top three by qualifying third. Pepe Oriola was fourth and the first of the Yokohama Trophy drivers, while Muller's Chevrolet teammates Robert Huff and Alain Menu could manage only fifth and ninth respectively.

Tarquini got a better jump than Muller initially, but Muller made full use of the inside line to keep his lead at the start. Once ahead, he rapidly drove away from the field and cruised to victory, with his lead peaking at 8 seconds at one stage before he backed off at the end. Tarquini had a much harder time in second, with Coronel attacking him throughout the race, but was unable to get past and had to settle for third despite seeming to have a quicker car. Huff and Menu finished fourth and fifth, with sixth enough for Pepe Oriola to win in the Yokohama category.

In the second race, Stefano D'Aste led early on from pole. Menu, who started second briefly lost out to Franz Engstler before regaining it and then closed down D'Aste, eventually passing him just after mid-distance. Later, oil on the track at turn 10 caused chaos as the top three of Menu, D'Aste and Engstler all went off; Tom Coronel was the beneficiary and moved into second place right behind Menu. On the last lap, there was a minor collision as Coronel attempted to pass, which sent Menu into a slide but he was able to hold it and take the win. Coronel was less than a second behind in second, and D'Aste was third as well as being the Yokohama winner. Yvan Muller could manage only eighth as he also was caught out by the oil and went off track.

=== Round Three – Morocco ===
At the start of Q2, Tom Coronel set the pace in his ROAL Motorsport BMW and looked set to take pole position until the final minutes when the factory Chevrolets of Alain Menu and Robert Huff went quicker. Championship leader Yvan Muller had to settle for fourth, with the Independents category pole being taken again by Pepe Oriola. On the morning of the race, Gabriele Tarquini, who qualified fifth, had his Q2 times disallowed after his car was deemed underweight, and so would have to start 12th.

The three Chevrolet drivers led away at the start, Menu followed by Huff and Muller, and in the middle of the field, a collision between local driver Mehdi Bennani and James Nash sent the latter into the wall and brought out the safety car. Later around the lap, Coronel was tagged by Alex MacDowall and sent spinning out of the top ten, MacDowall also lost out after having to go down an escape road as a result. After the race resumed, the Chevrolets had an incident free run and took a 1–2–3 finish, Menu winning from Huff and Muller, with Pepe Oriola finishing fourth and taking his third Yokohama category win. Team Aon scored their first points as Tom Chilton finished seventh.

A quick repair job from Team Aon meant that James Nash was sent out in time to take his pole position in Race 2. The Brit led from the start, but he soon came under pressure from Franz Engstler. The Chevrolet trio of Muller, Huff and Menu were sixth, seventh and eighth at the end of the first lap, but with the long straights suiting their superior top-end speed, they were able to pick the others off one by one. By the end of lap 5, Muller was in second place behind Nash. One lap later, he had taken the lead with Huff following him through, Menu wasn't left out and took third soon after. Chevrolet took another 1–2–3 finish, in reverse order of Race One, with Muller the winner, Huff second and Menu third. Stefano D'Aste took another Yokohama trophy win by finishing fifth despite starting outside the top ten.

=== Round Four – Slovakia ===
Qualifying was full of surprises as Norbert Michelisz took pole position for Zengő Motorsport and BMW's first pole after withdrawing its full factory effort. Aleksei Dudukalo took a career-best second ahead Lukoil Racing Team teammate Gabriele Tarquini. The Chevrolet team surprisingly struggled, with Yvan Muller sixth, Robert Huff seventh and Alain Menu ninth.

Michelisz held off his pursuers at the start but was quickly under attack from the Lukoil cars of Tarquini and Dudukalo. On the third lap, Tarquini overshot his braking and bumped into the back of Michelisz, sending him wide and this allowed both Tarquini and Dudukalo to go through. Michelisz dropped down to third and suffered even more a lap later when Muller spun him round; the Frenchman was given a drive-through penalty as a result. Tarquini was able to build a gap to the rest of the field and took the first non-Chevrolet win of the season, with Dudukalo completing a Lukoil Racing 1–2 and taking the Yokohama class victory. The Russian had briefly lost second to Pepe Oriola after going off track, but regained it and the Yokohama trophy lead after the latter suffered a puncture with two laps to go. Alain Menu finished third to close the gap to Muller to nine points, while Michelisz had to make do with sixth.

The reversed top 10 grid for Race 2 saw the Chevrolets closer to the front, and Robert Huff wasted no time moving up from fourth on the grid to the lead by turn 3. He built a gap early on, before Muller moved into second and closed his teammate down. Menu moved into third before being passed by Tarquini on the third lap, and then retired with a wheel rim failure a lap later. Once clear of Menu, Tarquini then closed the gap to the leading two Chevrolets but was unable to pass Muller. Huff benefited from the presence of Tarquini as Muller was forced to defend from him, and built a gap and took his first win of the season. Tarquini hit Muller on the last lap sending him into a slide, but Muller was able to control it and stay ahead of Tarquini to the flag. Pepe Oriola made up for his Race 1 disappointment by winning the Independents class with a fifth-place finish.

=== Round Five – Hungary ===
Unlike in Slovakia, Chevrolet had absolutely no problems in qualifying as they took a 1–2–3, with Yvan Muller taking pole three-tenths ahead of Robert Huff, and Alain Menu a further two-tenths back in third. The Independents category pole was taken by Mehdi Bennani who qualified fifth in the Proteam Racing BMW.

In the rolling start for Race 1, Gabriele Tarquini immediately got alongside the two Chevrolets on the front row, only to hit Huff at the first corner and damage his rear suspension, forcing him to retire and causing a chain reaction in which local driver Norbert Michelisz was pushed off. Mehdi Bennani briefly moved into second before being pushed back to fourth at turn 3 by the Chevrolets who now led 1–2–3. They quickly left the rest of the field behind and Yvan Muller took an unchallenged victory ahead of Rob Huff. Huff had to fend off a mid-race attack from Alain Menu who despite staying within a second of Huff throughout the race had to settle for third. Bennani finished fourth, over 10 seconds behind the Chevrolets, but as a comfortable winner in the Yokohama class.

It was Norbert Michelisz who got the best start from fifth on the grid in Race 2 as he quickly got alongside and then past poleman Franz Engstler to lead into turn 1. As Engstler got shuffled back into the back, Michelisz pulled out a gap on the second place battle between Pepe Oriola and Bennani, which was joined later on by Alain Menu. On lap 9, Bennani made a move on Oriola into turn 1 but this left the door open for Menu who got past both of them to move into second. Menu then began to close in on Michelisz but ran out of laps and Michelisz took the overall (and Independents) win in front of his home fans. Bennani finished third, which was his first outright podium. Rob Huff spent the whole race in traffic and finished seventh, but still gained points on Yvan Muller who ended up tenth after losing places by going off track on the last lap.

=== Round Six – Austria ===
On a circuit full of long straights, it was no surprise at all that the Chevrolet team dominated proceedings in qualifying with a 1–2–3, Robert Huff taking his first pole of the season ahead of Yvan Muller, with Alain Menu again having to make do with third. The Yokohoma category pole went to Alex MacDowall in the bamboo-engineering Chevrolet, the Brit qualifying an impressive fifth overall.

Huff led into the first corner from the rolling start but on a track where slipstreaming is paramount, had no chance of getting away from Muller and Menu. Muller especially put Huff under intense pressure for long periods of the race, using the tow to get alongside him on multiple occasions. Huff was able to hold Muller off and take his second win of the season, with Menu finishing a close third. Alex MacDowall won the Independents class, his first of the season after finishing in sixth place.

Aleksei Dudukalo had pole for Race 2, but it was Tom Coronel who led the early stages of the race. At the end of the first lap, Muller and Huff were seventh and eighth, but using the slipstream effect and their superior top speed, picked off the cars in front rapidly. On lap 4, Muller passed Coronel to take the lead, Huff took second a lap later and Menu who had lost out to his teammates at the start moved into third at half-distance. The second half of the race was strewn with punctures for the front-wheel drive Chevrolets and SEATs. Tiago Monteiro, Alex MacDowall and Menu all crashed out as a result of punctures, whereas Dudukalo, teammate Gabriele Tarquini and Pasquale Di Sabatino were forced to pit for new rubber. Muller and Huff had broken clear of the rest of the pack, but were then told by the team to back off and hold station. However, Muller's left front tyre punctured on the last lap with four corners left, Huff took the lead only to suffer the same fate at the last corner. Coronel in second got held up behind the slowing Chevrolet, and Stefano D'Aste swept around the outside of both Huff and Coronel to take the overall win along with the Yokohama win. Huff held off Coronel on the line to take second, and with Muller limping home in eighth place, was able to cut Muller's championship lead down to eight points.

=== Round Seven – Portugal ===
Gabriele Tarquini, in his Lukoil Racing SEAT took his second pole position of the season, three-tenths ahead of championship leader Yvan Muller. Norbert Michelisz qualified in third place ahead of Robert Huff and took pole in the Independents class. Alain Menu, racing in special Vaillante colours after French comic book racer Michel Vaillant, struggled and could only manage ninth.

At the start, Muller drove around the outside of Tarquini into turn 1 and took the lead, Huff did the same to Michelisz and moved into third. Tarquini was under pressure from Huff in the early stages but held him off and valiantly stuck with Muller throughout the race. Muller won his sixth race of the year, with Tarquini and Huff both under a second behind him as they completed the podium. Michelisz finished a lonely fourth and took the Independents class win by 14 seconds. Menu fought back to fifth but as a result of Muller's win, dropped 50 points behind in the championship.

It was Pepe Oriola who had pole for Race 2, but he was jumped off the line by Menu and Tom Coronel. Menu, in Vaillante colours promptly distanced himself from the rest of the field by building up a 6-second lead within 4 laps, and took a comfortable win. Oriola passed Coronel on the third lap to claim second and stayed there for the remainder of the race, taking the Yokohama win as well as his first outright podium. Behind third-placed Coronel, a heated battle for fourth took place between Tarquini, Muller and Huff, culminating in an incident with three laps left when Tarquini tagged Huff and spun into the back of Muller, sending him off track. Huff came through to take fourth whereas Tarquini retired as a result of damage and Muller dropped to sixth before passing Alberto Cerqui to finish fifth.

=== Round Eight – Brazil ===
The Chevrolets qualified 1–2–3 just like they did in the previous year's race, with championship leader Yvan Muller taking his third pole of the season ahead of Alain Menu and Robert Huff. Michel Nykjær, driving in a one-off outing in the bamboo-engineering Chevrolet qualified in fourth, only behind the factory trio and was on pole in the Independents category.

The start of Race 1 was incident free, Muller moving into the lead ahead of Menu while Huff came under attack from a fast-starting Gabriele Tarquini but held off the Italian. The three Chevrolets then left the rest of the field behind and took their sixth 1–2–3 finish of the season, with Muller taking yet another win leaving Menu to settle for second and Huff third. Nykjær, driving his first race of the season, finished fifth behind Tarquini and took the win in the Yokohama category.

For Race 2, Darryl O'Young, supposed to start fourth, had to start from the back after mechanical issues forced extended repairs on his car. Norbert Michelisz led the early stages before the safety car was called after a crash for Charles Ng. At the restart, Michelisz was passed by Gabriele Tarquini and the three Chevrolets, led by Huff. New race leader Tarquini came under attack from Huff, who got past at two-thirds distance. With Tarquini holding up his teammates, Huff was able to pull away and take his third win of the season. Menu finished second after passing Tarquini with three laps left, but the Italian was able to hold off Muller and take third. Michelisz had to make do with fifth but took the Independents class win.

=== Round Nine – USA ===
At Chevrolet's home race, Alain Menu took pole position, his first since Morocco with a late qualifying lap. Gabriele Tarquini qualified second for Lukoil SEAT, two-tenths behind Menu. The other two Chevrolets of Yvan Muller and Robert Huff had to settle for third and fourth. Pole in the Yokohama category was taken by Norbert Michelisz, who qualified fifth overall.

There was minor contact between Menu and Tarquini at the second corner on the first lap in Race 1, as a result of which the latter was pushed wide and dropped down to fifth. Menu kept the lead of the race, but was quickly under pressure from Yvan Muller. The Frenchman passed Menu on lap 4 to take the lead, with Huff following him though into second. Things became worse for Menu a lap later, when he had to pit for repairs after a power steering issue and was knocked out of contention. Muller and Huff left the rest of the field behind, and Muller took his eighth win of the season ahead of Huff. Norbert Michelisz finished third behind the Chevrolets and took the Independents win.

Poleman Stefano D'Aste went off on the first lap of Race 2, and so Mehdi Bennani lead the early stages. Franz Engstler was second but he soon came under attack from Muller. On lap 4, Bennani spun off into the barriers and Engstler, having kept Muller behind him, took the lead. The battle between Engstler and Muller reached a head a lap later when Muller spun Engstler around at turn 6. Engstler rejoined at the tail of the top ten, whereas Muller led but was given a drive-through penalty. The penalty dropped Muller to the tail of the field, and Huff inherited the lead and held it for the rest of the race to win. Michelisz pressured Huff throughout the second half of the race but settled for second place and another Yokohama class win, with Gabriele Tarquini completing the podium. Muller finished out of the points, and as a result, Huff's win took him level on points with Muller with 3 rounds left. Alain Menu recovered to fourth after a poor start, which left him 48 points behind his teammates in the championship.

=== Round Ten – Japan ===
Unsurprisingly, the Chevrolets set the pace in qualifying, as it swept the top three spots on the grid. Alain Menu took his second consecutive pole position, with Yvan Muller alongside on the front row and Robert Huff in third. The Yokohama category pole went to Alex MacDowall in his bamboo-engineering Chevrolet, MacDowall having qualified fourth only behind the three factory cars.

Menu led from pole at the start, and there was minor contact between Muller and Huff as they battled for second behind him. Muller came away with his second place intact. Gabriele Tarquini moved into fourth and was able to keep up with the pace of the Chevrolets early in the race, but dropped off as the race progressed. Chevrolet took another unchallenged 1–2–3, and on a track where overtaking is difficult, kept their formation at the end of the first lap as Menu won with Muller second and Huff third. MacDowall's fifth place was enough for him to take the Yokohama class win.

Once again, Stefano D'Aste had pole in the reverse grid race, and unlike at Sonoma, he kept the lead at the start. D'Aste soon came under pressure from Pepe Oriola who seemed to be faster but was unable to pass due to the nature of the track. Later in the race, D'Aste was able to pull away and take his second overall (and fifth Independents) win of the year, with Oriola second after holding off Gabriele Tarquini. The difficulty in passing also stymied the Chevrolets as they could only finish fourth, fifth and sixth. Rob Huff was the lead Chevrolet in fourth and this combined with Muller's sixth place meant that the duo left Japan tied on points.

=== Round Eleven – China ===
After a close qualifying session, Alain Menu took another pole position ahead of Chevrolet teammate Yvan Muller, the duo being separated by two just hundredths of a second. Norbert Michelisz, in the Zengő Motorsport BMW qualified in third and took the Independents class pole to increase his class lead. The third Chevrolet of Robert Huff had to make do with fourth on the grid.

From pole, Menu led into the first corner and Huff moved from fourth to second, whereas there was contact between Muller and Michelisz. That resulted in a domino effect and there were more incidents in the mid-pack during the third and fourth corners, which resulted in a spread out field, cars being spun to the back, and others having to pit and retire with damage. One of those was Muller, who had to retire with a broken rear suspension. Since no safety car was called, Menu and Huff were left well clear of the rest of the field and took a comfortable 1–2 for Chevrolet, Menu taking his fifth win of the season. Stefano D'Aste was another beneficiary of the first lap chaos as he moved into third and stayed there unchallenged for the duration of the race, also taking the Independents win along with it.

Tom Coronel had a clean start from pole in Race 2 and led into the first corner. There was contact behind him between Alex MacDowall and Norbert Michelisz, with both drivers going off track. Menu benefited from that to move into fourth place, ahead of his teammates, by jumping both of them on the line despite starting behind them. As the race progressed, he was able to use the straight line speed of the Chevrolet to pass the cars in front one by one, and took the lead on lap 4. Muller and Huff were not far behind and passed Coronel on the next lap to move into second and third. Muller then chased after Menu and attacked him a few laps later, but misjudged his move and hit the back of the Swiss driver sending him off the track and into a half spin. Muller himself went wide as a result, and Huff once again inherited the lead, with Menu rejoining third behind Muller. Huff went on to win, whereas Muller and Menu continued to battle for what was now second, switching places two more times with Muller ultimately taking the place. Stefano D'Aste finished fifth and took a double win the Independents class, and moved into contention for the Independents title as both Michelisz and Pepe Oriola struggled. After the race, Muller was given a thirty-second time penalty for the contact with Menu and it dropped him to thirteenth and out of the points, with Menu promoted to second and Coronel to third. As a result, Rob Huff led the championship by 35 points over Menu, and Muller in third was 41 points behind.

=== Round Twelve – Macau ===
Robert Huff, arriving with the championship lead, took the 5 points for pole position and to further extend his lead. His two title rivals and Chevrolet teammates, Yvan Muller and Alain Menu qualified second and third, but Muller was seven-tenths and Menu a second slower than Huff's qualifying time. The Independents class pole was taken by bamboo-engineering's Darryl O'Young, in his home race.

In Race 1, Muller got a better start than Huff and grabbed the lead. Further down the field, there was a collision between Stefano D'Aste and Mehdi Bennani at Lisboa corner which blocked the track briefly. No safety car or red flag was called as the cars were running again quickly, but this left the top six of Muller, Huff, Menu, Gabriele Tarquini, Tiago Monteiro and Darryl O'Young half a minute clear of the rest of the field. The crash forced many cars into the pits to retire, including Norbert Michelisz, Pepe Oriola and D'Aste, the three drivers in the Independents championship battle. Despite needing only second place to seal the championship, Huff attacked Muller and passed him on lap 4. Later on the same lap however, he crashed into a barrier and damaged his suspension, forcing him into the pits for repairs. Muller reclaimed the lead but came under attack from Menu, who attempted to pass on the penultimate lap but could not. Muller held on to win and reduce the gap to Huff to 17 points, with Menu's second place leaving him 19 points behind Huff and keeping him in contention as well. Tiago Monteiro took third place, his first podium of the season and Honda's first in the championship. O'Young was the only Independent car to not lose half a minute in the track blockage on the first lap and so he cruised to his first Independent category win of the season.

The reversed grid had Alex MacDowall on pole in the second race, but he was jumped off the line by Norbert Michelisz. Behind him, Menu had a much better start than his teammates and was up to fourth, whereas Muller and Huff were seventh and eighth. MacDowall passed Michelisz for the lead at the start of the second, and the Hungarian was passed by Menu later in the same lap. MacDowall made a mistake on lap 3 and dropped to fourth behind Menu, Michelisz and Pepe Oriola, Michelisz's main rival in the Independents class. At the start of lap 4, MacDowall came under attack from Muller and made contact with the latter, spinning him into the barrier and bringing out the safety car. Huff moved into fourth ahead of Muller who had to slow to avoid the spinning MacDowall. When the race restarted, Oriola attacked Michelisz for second but outbraked himself and crashed into the back of Michelisz at Lisboa, ending with both in the barriers and out of the race, and promoting Huff to second and Muller to third. The safety car was brought out for the second and final time as there was not enough time to clear the two cars. The race finished in safety car conditions, and Chevrolet took a 1–2–3 in its final WTCC race as a manufacturer, Menu the winner ahead of Huff and Muller. Huff's second place was enough for him to secure his first drivers championship, 12 points ahead of Menu and 20 ahead of Muller. In the Independents category, with Michelisz, Oriola and MacDowall all ending up in the barriers, Darryl O'Young was left to make it a double win. Norbert Michelisz took the Independents class title despite not scoring any points in Macau, as his two main rivals Oriola and Stefano D'Aste also scored no points.

== Results and standings ==
=== Races ===
Race	Race Name	Pole Position	Fastest lap	Winning driver	Winning team	Yokohama winner	Report
1	Race of Italy	(Italy) Gabriele Tarquini	(Sweden) Rickard Rydell	(France) Yvan Muller	(United Kingdom) Chevrolet	(Spain) Pepe Oriola	Report
2	Race of Italy		(United Kingdom) Robert Huff	(France) Yvan Muller	(United Kingdom) Chevrolet	(Italy) Stefano D'Aste	Report
3	Race of Spain	(France) Yvan Muller	(France) Yvan Muller	(France) Yvan Muller	(United Kingdom) Chevrolet	(Spain) Pepe Oriola	Report
4	Race of Spain		(Switzerland) Alain Menu	(Switzerland) Alain Menu	(United Kingdom) Chevrolet	(Italy) Stefano D'Aste	Report
5	Race of Morocco	(Switzerland) Alain Menu	(Spain) Pepe Oriola	(Switzerland) Alain Menu	(United Kingdom) Chevrolet	(Spain) Pepe Oriola	Report
6	Race of Morocco		(Switzerland) Alain Menu	(France) Yvan Muller	(United Kingdom) Chevrolet	(Italy) Stefano D'Aste	Report
7	Race of Slovakia	(Hungary) Norbert Michelisz	(Hungary) Norbert Michelisz	(Italy) Gabriele Tarquini	(Russia) Lukoil Racing Team	(Russia) Aleksei Dudukalo	Report
8	Race of Slovakia		(France) Yvan Muller	(United Kingdom) Robert Huff	(United Kingdom) Chevrolet	(Spain) Pepe Oriola	Report
9	Race of Hungary	(France) Yvan Muller	(France) Yvan Muller	(France) Yvan Muller	(United Kingdom) Chevrolet	(Morocco) Mehdi Bennani	Report
10	Race of Hungary		(Hungary) Norbert Michelisz	(Hungary) Norbert Michelisz	(Hungary) Zengő Motorsport	(Hungary) Norbert Michelisz	Report
11	Race of Austria	(United Kingdom) Robert Huff	(France) Yvan Muller	(United Kingdom) Robert Huff	(United Kingdom) Chevrolet	(United Kingdom) Alex MacDowall	Report
12	Race of Austria		(Switzerland) Alain Menu	(Italy) Stefano D'Aste	(Germany) Wiechers-Sport	(Italy) Stefano D'Aste	Report
13	Race of Portugal	(Italy) Gabriele Tarquini	(France) Yvan Muller	(France) Yvan Muller	(United Kingdom) Chevrolet	(Hungary) Norbert Michelisz	Report
14	Race of Portugal		(Switzerland) Alain Menu	(Switzerland) Alain Menu	(United Kingdom) Chevrolet	(Spain) Pepe Oriola	Report
15	Race of Brazil	(France) Yvan Muller	(France) Yvan Muller	(France) Yvan Muller	(United Kingdom) Chevrolet	(Denmark) Michel Nykjær	Report
16	Race of Brazil		(United Kingdom) Robert Huff	(United Kingdom) Robert Huff	(United Kingdom) Chevrolet	(Hungary) Norbert Michelisz	Report
17	Race of the United States	(Switzerland) Alain Menu	(France) Yvan Muller	(France) Yvan Muller	(United Kingdom) Chevrolet	(Hungary) Norbert Michelisz	Report
18	Race of the United States		(France) Yvan Muller	(United Kingdom) Robert Huff	(United Kingdom) Chevrolet	(Hungary) Norbert Michelisz	Report
19	Race of Japan	(Switzerland) Alain Menu	(Switzerland) Alain Menu	(Switzerland) Alain Menu	(United Kingdom) Chevrolet	(United Kingdom) Alex MacDowall	Report
20	Race of Japan		(Spain) Pepe Oriola	(Italy) Stefano D'Aste	(Germany) Wiechers-Sport	(Italy) Stefano D'Aste	Report
21	Race of China	(Switzerland) Alain Menu	(Switzerland) Alain Menu	(Switzerland) Alain Menu	(United Kingdom) Chevrolet	(Italy) Stefano D'Aste	Report
22	Race of China		(United Kingdom) Robert Huff	(United Kingdom) Robert Huff	(United Kingdom) Chevrolet	(Italy) Stefano D'Aste	Report
23	Guia Race of Macau	(United Kingdom) Robert Huff	(Switzerland) Alain Menu	(France) Yvan Muller	(United Kingdom) Chevrolet	(Hong Kong) Darryl O'Young	Report
24	Guia Race of Macau		(United Kingdom) Robert Huff	(Switzerland) Alain Menu	(United Kingdom) Chevrolet	(Hong Kong) Darryl O'Young	Report

=== Standings ===
==== Drivers' Championship ====
Pos.	Driver	ITA (Italy)		ESP (Spain)		MAR (Morocco)		SVK (Slovakia)		HUN (Hungary)		AUT (Austria)		POR (Portugal)		BRA (Brazil)		USA (United States)		JPN (Japan)		CHN (China)		MAC (Macau)		Pts
1	(United Kingdom) Robert Huff	2^{3}	3	4^{5}	6	2^{2}	2	17†	1	2^{2}	7	**1**^{1}	2	3^{4}	4	3^{3}	1	2^{4}	1	3^{3}	4	2^{4}	1	**Ret**^{1}	2	413
2	(Switzerland) Alain Menu	7^{4}	2	5	1	**1**^{1}	3	3	Ret	3^{3}	2	3^{3}	Ret	5	1	2^{2}	2	**18**^{1}	4	**1**^{1}	5	**1**^{1}	2	2^{3}	1	401
3	(France) Yvan Muller	1^{2}	1	**1**^{1}	8	3^{4}	1	10	2	**1**^{1}	10	2^{2}	8	1^{2}	5	**1**^{1}	4	1^{3}	14	2^{2}	6	Ret^{2}	13	1^{2}	3	393
4	(Italy) Gabriele Tarquini	**3**^{1}	Ret	2^{2}	9	11	Ret	1^{3}	3	Ret^{4}	6	4^{4}	16	**2**^{1}	19†	4^{5}	3	4^{2}	3	4	3	5	6	4^{4}	20†	252
5	(Netherlands) Tom Coronel	5	4	3^{3}	2	8^{3}	4	14	4	6	12	8	3	6^{5}	3	8	7	8	5	6	15	4	**3**	6	Ret	207
6	(Hungary) Norbert Michelisz	9	**8**	7	4	9	Ret	**6**^{1}	6	7	1	9	5	4^{3}	10	9	**5**	3^{5}	2	13	Ret	15^{3}	24	NC	21†	155
7	(Italy) Stefano D'Aste	11	5	11	**3**	5	5	5	**14**	17	8	Ret	1	11	18	17	13	9	**9**	8	**1**	3	4	Ret	23†	144
8	(Spain) Pepe Oriola	6	12	6^{4}	7	4^{5}	7	16†	5	8	4	7	4	9	**2**	16	17†	16†	11	7	2	22	Ret	Ret	22†	131
9	(Portugal) Tiago Monteiro	Ret	18†	9	13	NC	9	Ret^{5}	Ret	5	5	5	Ret	7	8	Ret	9	6	6	9	10	13	10	3^{5}	4	95
10	(United Kingdom) Alex MacDowall	8	7	15	14	12	Ret	12	Ret	9	11	6^{5}	Ret	10	7	6	11	5	7	5^{4}	9	NC	17	9	**Ret**	68
11	(Morocco) Mehdi Bennani	Ret	14	14	10	Ret	12	11	7	4^{5}	3	17	6	Ret	Ret	12	8	11	Ret	21^{5}	7	8	5	Ret	Ret	68
12	(Germany) Franz Engstler	12	6	8	5	6	8	Ret	13	NC	**9**	11	9	12	9	15	Ret	7	10	10	11	9	15	7	6	64
13	(Italy) Alberto Cerqui	10	9	13	Ret	15	Ret	4	8	13	18	13	7	8	6	NC	Ret	Ret	13	Ret	14	7	9			45
14	(Hong Kong) Darryl O'Young	DNS	DNS	10	Ret	10	10	7	9	NC	13	Ret	DNS	13	13	7	Ret	14	12	11	13	Ret	12	5	5	37
15	(Russia) Aleksei Dudukalo	18†	Ret	NC	12	16	11	2^{2}	15	14	16	19†	**14**	Ret	16	11	10	Ret	18	18	8	NC	11	11	7	33
16	(Denmark) Michel Nykjær															5^{4}	6									20
17	(United Kingdom) Tom Boardman			20	Ret	14	DNS	8	11	Ret	DNS	18†	DNS	14	Ret	19†	12	10	8	12	12	12	8	10	9	16
18	(United Kingdom) Colin Turkington																					6^{5}	7			15
19	(Sweden) Rickard Rydell	4^{5}	10																							14
20	(United Kingdom) James Nash	16	13	12	Ret	Ret	**6**	Ret^{4}	DNS	11	19†	10	10	Ret	Ret	14	15	17†	17	19	16	Ret	Ret	12	12	12
21	(Switzerland) Fredy Barth																					14	14	8	8	8
22	(United Kingdom) Tom Chilton	13	16	19	15	7	16†	Ret	10	15	14	16	11	16	15	18	16†	12	15	15	18	11	19	13	Ret	7
23	(Hungary) Gábor Wéber	17†	11	17	Ret			9	Ret	10	17	15	12	Ret	12											3
24	(Spain) Fernando Monje			21	18											10	14	NC	Ret	14	Ret	Ret	16	14	10	2
25	(Hong Kong) Charles Ng	15	Ret	18	19†	Ret	13	15	DNS	16	Ret	14	13	18†	14	13	Ret	15	DSQ	22	17	10	23	Ret	Ret	1
26	(Macau) Andre Couto																							15	11	0
27	(Spain) Isaac Tutumlu	Ret	17	16	11	Ret	DNS																			0
28	(United Kingdom) James Thompson									Ret	Ret			17†	11											0
29	(Italy) Pasquale Di Sabatino	14	19†	22	16	17	15	13	12	12	15	12	15	15	17											0
30	(Belgium) Andrea Barlesi	Ret	15	23	17	13	14																			0
31	(United States) Robb Holland																	13	16							0
32	(Macau) Jo Merszei																							17	13	0
33	(Macau) Felipe De Souza																					19	21	18†	14	0
34	(Macau) Célio Alves Dias																							19†	15	0
35	(France) Hugo Valente																					16	18			0
36	(Japan) Hiroki Yoshimoto																			16	19					0
37	(Macau) Mak Ka Lok																							21†	16	0
38	(Macau) Henry Ho																							16	Ret	0
39	(Macau) Kin Veng Ng																					20	22	Ret	17	0
40	(Germany) René Münnich																			17	20					0
41	(Macau) Kelvin Leong																					17	Ret			0
42	(Hong Kong) Eric Kwong																					18	20			0
43	(Macau) Eurico de Jesus																							Ret	18	0
44	(Italy) Kei Cozzolino																							20†	19†	0
45	(Japan) Masaki Kano																			20	21					0
46	(Macau) Alex Liu																					21	25†			0
	(Italy) Felice Tedeschi																	DNS	DNS							0
Pos	Driver	ITA (Italy)		ESP (Spain)		MAR (Morocco)		SVK (Slovakia)		HUN (Hungary)		AUT (Austria)		POR (Portugal)		BRA (Brazil)		USA (United States)		JPN (Japan)		CHN (China)		MAC (Macau)		Pts

Colour	Result
Gold	Winner
Silver	Second place
Bronze	Third place
Green	Points classification
Blue	Non-points classification
Blue	Non-classified finish (NC)
Purple	Retired, not classified (Ret)
Red	Did not qualify (DNQ)
Red	Did not pre-qualify (DNPQ)
Black	Disqualified (DSQ)
White	Did not start (DNS)
White	Withdrew (WD)
White	Race cancelled (C)
Blank	Did not practice (DNP)
Blank	Did not arrive (DNA)
Blank	Excluded (EX)

**Bold** – Pole
Italics – Fastest Lap

Championship points were awarded on the results after the second qualifying session at each event as follows:

Position	**1st**	**2nd**	**3rd**	**4th**	**5th**
Points	5	4	3	2	1

Championship points were awarded on the results of each race at each event as follows:

Position	**1st**	**2nd**	**3rd**	**4th**	**5th**	**6th**	**7th**	**8th**	**9th**	**10th**
Points	25	18	15	12	10	8	6	4	2	1

Notes

- ^{1} ^{2} ^{3} ^{4} ^{5} refers to the classification of the drivers after the second element of qualifying, where bonus points are awarded 5–4–3–2–1 for the fastest five drivers.

† — Drivers did not finish the race, but were classified as they completed over 90% of the race distance.

==== Manufacturers' Championship ====
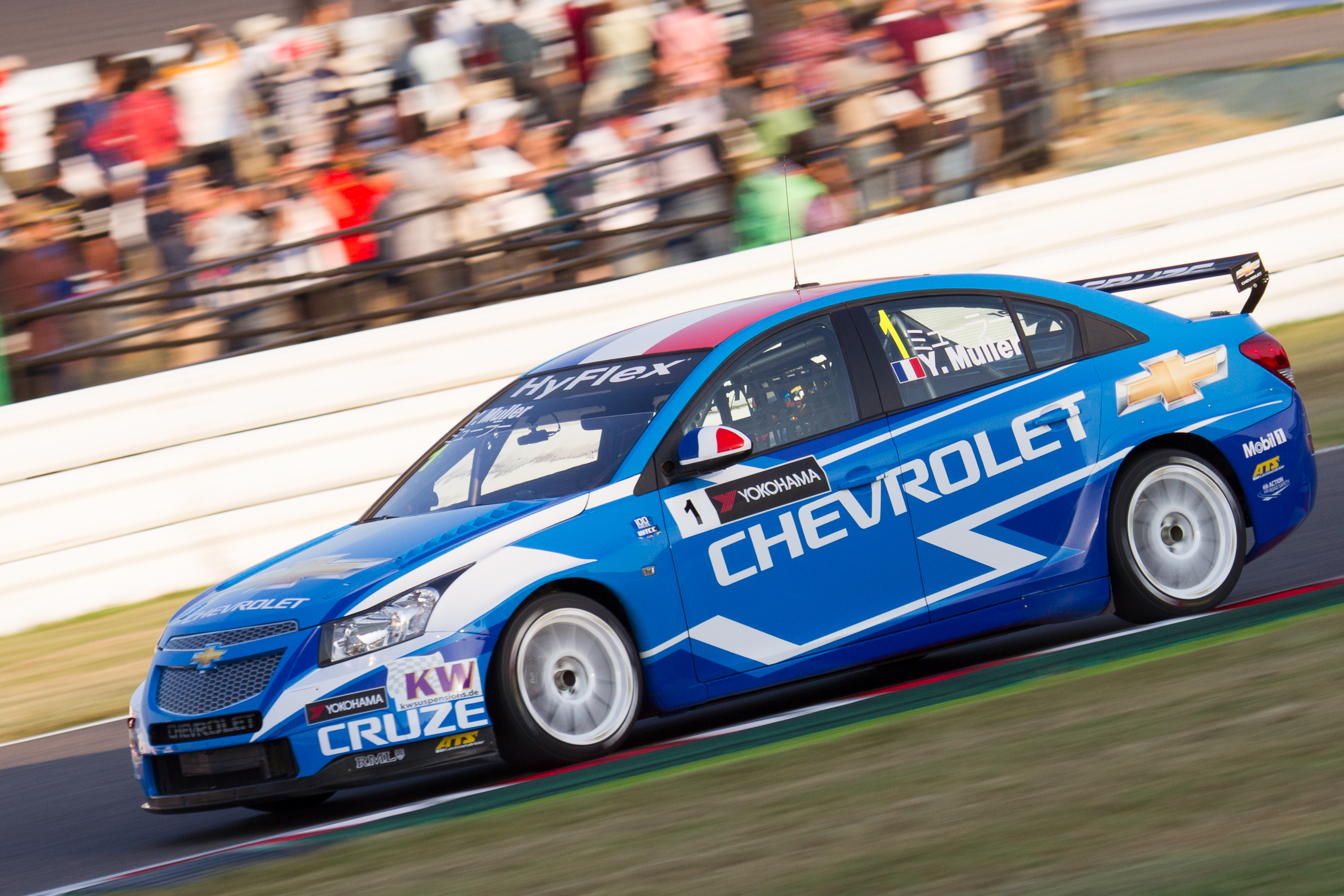
Chevrolet won the Manufacturers' Championship

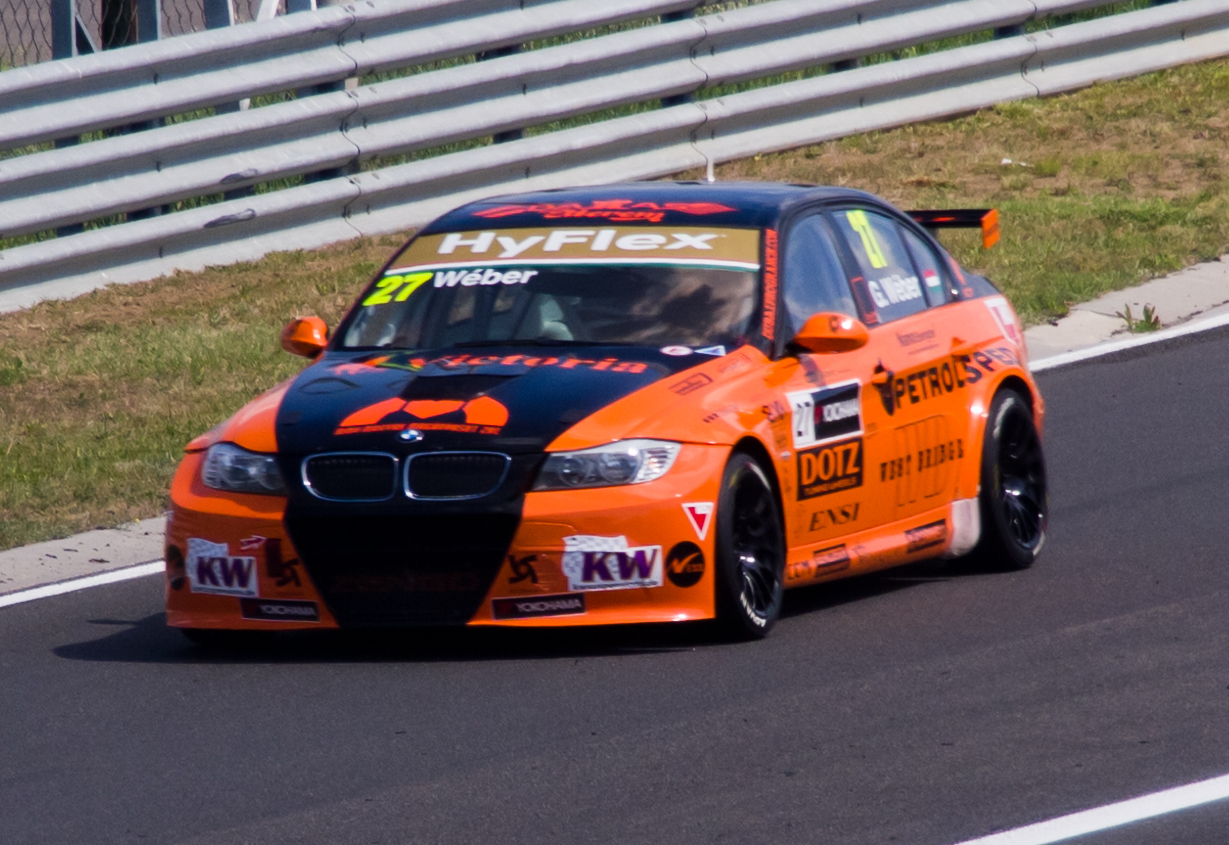
BMW Customer Racing Teams placed second in the Manufacturers' Championship

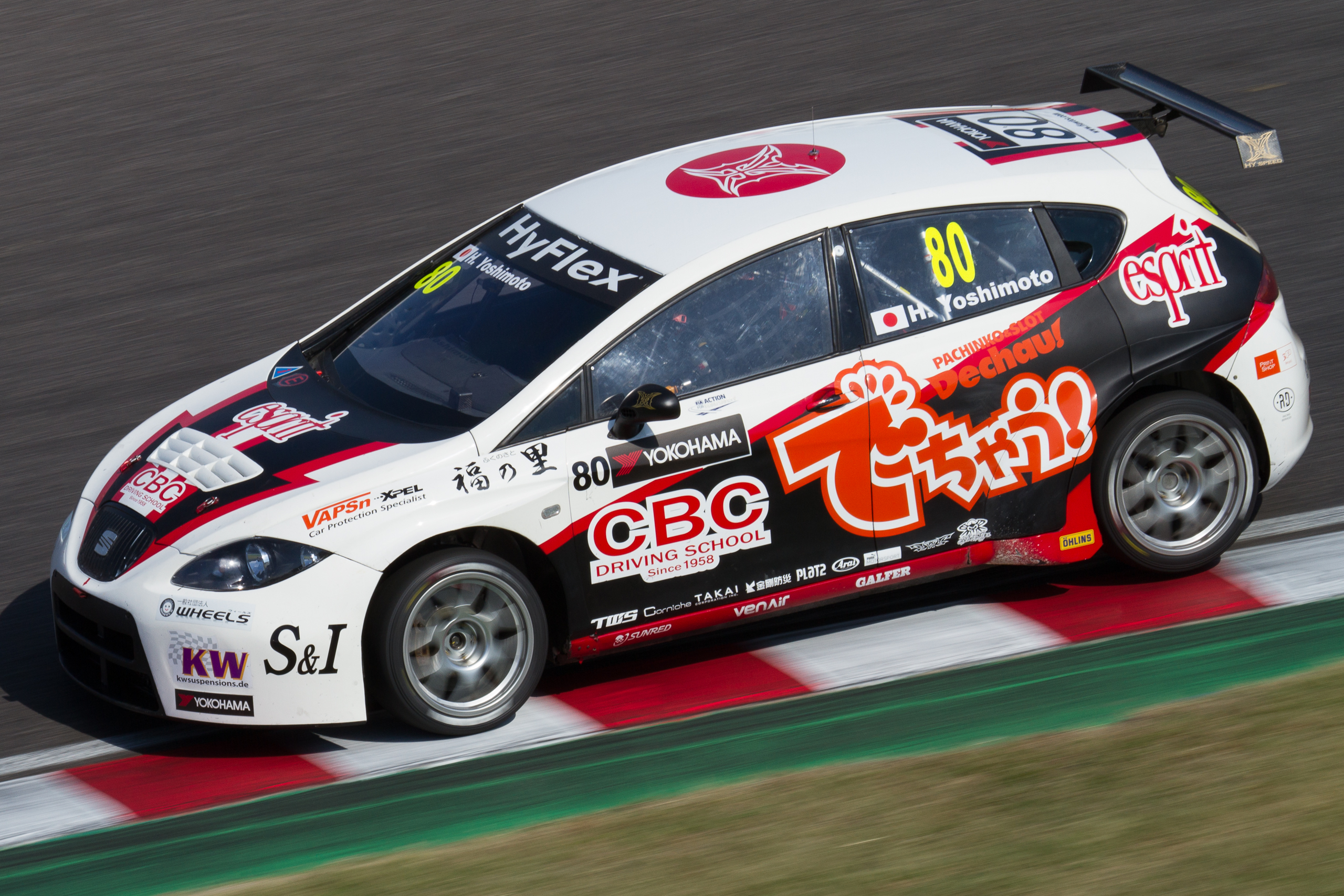
SEAT Racing Technology placed third in the Manufacturers' Championship

Pos.	Manufacturer	ITA (Italy)		ESP (Spain)		MAR (Morocco)		SVK (Slovakia)		HUN (Hungary)		AUT (Austria)		POR (Portugal)		BRA (Brazil)		USA (United States)		JPN (Japan)		CHN (China)		MAC (Macau)		Pts
1	(United States) Chevrolet	1^{2}	1	1^{1}	1	1^{1}	1	3^{4}	1	1^{1}	2	1^{1}	2	1^{2}	1	1^{1}	1	1^{1}	1	1^{1}	4	1^{1}	1	1^{1}	1	1025
1	(United States) Chevrolet	2^{3}	2	4^{5}	6	2^{2}	2	10^{5}	2	2^{2}	8	2^{2}	8	3^{4}	4	2^{2}	2	2^{3}	4	2^{2}	5	2^{2}	2	2^{2}	2	1025
2	(Germany) BMW	5^{4}	4	3^{3}	2	5^{3}	4	4^{1}	4	4^{4}	1	8^{4}	1	4^{3}	3	8^{5}	5	3^{4}	2	6^{3}	1	3^{3}	3	6^{4}	6	650
2	(Germany) BMW	9	5	7	3	6^{5}	5	5	6	6^{5}	3	9	3	6^{5}	6	9	7	7	5	8^{5}	7	4^{4}	4	7^{5}	13	650
3	(Spain) SEAT	3^{1}	12	2^{2}	7	4^{4}	7	1^{2}	3	5^{3}	4	4^{3}	4	2^{1}	2	4^{3}	3	4^{2}	3	4^{4}	2	5^{5}	6	4^{3}	7	617
3	(Spain) SEAT	6^{5}	15	6^{4}	9	10	9	2^{3}	5	8	5	5^{5}	14	9	8	7^{4}	9	6^{5}	6	7	3	12	8	8	8	617
Pos	Manufacturer	ITA (Italy)		ESP (Spain)		MAR (Morocco)		SVK (Slovakia)		HUN (Hungary)		AUT (Austria)		POR (Portugal)		BRA (Brazil)		USA (United States)		JPN (Japan)		CHN (China)		MAC (Macau)		Pts

Championship points were awarded on the results after the second qualifying session at each event as follows:

Position	**1st**	**2nd**	**3rd**	**4th**	**5th**
Points	5	4	3	2	1

Championship points were awarded on the results of each race at each event as follows:

Position	**1st**	**2nd**	**3rd**	**4th**	**5th**	**6th**	**7th**	**8th**	**9th**	**10th**
Points	25	18	15	12	10	8	6	4	2	1

Notes

Only the two best placed cars of each manufacturer earned points.

- ^{1} ^{2} ^{3} ^{4} ^{5} refers to the classification of the drivers after the second element of qualifying, where bonus points are awarded 5–4–3–2–1. Points were only awarded to the fastest two cars from each manufacturer.

==== Yokohama Trophies ====
World Touring Car Championship promoter Eurosport Events organised the Yokohama Drivers' Trophy and the Yokohama Teams' Trophy within the 2012 FIA World Touring Car Championship.

===== Yokohama Drivers' Trophy =====
Pos	Driver	ITA (Italy)		ESP (Spain)		MAR (Morocco)		SVK (Slovakia)		HUN (Hungary)		AUT (Austria)		POR (Portugal)		BRA (Brazil)		USA (United States)		JPN (Japan)		CHN (China)		MAC (Macau)		Pts
1	(Hungary) Norbert Michelisz	9	**8**	7	4	9	Ret	**6**	6	7	1	9	5	**4**	10	9	**5**	**3**	2	13	Ret	**15**	24	NC	21†	139
2	(Spain) Pepe Oriola	**6**	12	**6**	7	**4**	7	16†	5	8	4	7	4	9	**2**	16	17†	16†	11	7	2	22	Ret	Ret	22†	126
3	(Italy) Stefano D'Aste	11	5	11	**3**	5	5	5	**14**	17	8	Ret	1	11	18	18	13	9	**9**	8	**1**	3	4	Ret	23†	122
4	(Germany) Franz Engstler	12	6	8	5	6	**8**	Ret	13	NC	**9**	11	9	12	9	17	Ret	7	10	10	11	9	15	7	6	114
5	(United Kingdom) Alex MacDowall	8	7	15	14	12	Ret	12	Ret	9	11	**6**	Ret	10	7	6	11	5	7	**5**	9	NC	**17**	9	**Ret**	105
6	(Hong Kong) Darryl O'Young	DNS	DNS	10	Ret	10	10	7	9	NC	13	Ret	DNS	13	13	7	Ret	14	12	11	13	Ret	12	**5**	5	87
7	(Morocco) Mehdi Bennani	Ret	14	14	10	Ret	12	11	7	**4**	3	17	6	Ret	Ret	12	8	11	Ret	21	7	8	5	Ret	Ret	73
8	(Italy) Alberto Cerqui	10	9	13	Ret	15	Ret	4	8	13	18	13	7	8	6	NC	Ret	Ret	13	Ret	14	7	9			64
9	(Russia) Aleksei Dudukalo	18†	Ret	NC	12	16	11	2	15	14	16	19†	**14**	Ret	16	11	10	Ret	18	18	8	NC	12	11	7	52
10	(United Kingdom) Tom Boardman			20	Ret	14	DNS	8	11	Ret	DNS	18†	DNS	14	Ret	19†	12	10	8	12	12	12	8	10	9	51
11	(Switzerland) Fredy Barth																					14	14	8	8	26
12	(Denmark) Michel Nykjær															**5**	6									20
13	(Spain) Fernando Monje			21	18											10	14	NC	Ret	14	Ret	Ret	16	14	10	16
14	(Hungary) Gábor Wéber	17†	11	17	Ret			9	Ret	10	17	15	12	Ret	12											15
15	(Hong Kong) Charles Ng	15	Ret	18	19†	Ret	13	15	DNS	16	Ret	14	13	18†	14	13	Ret	15	DSQ	22	17	10	23	Ret	Ret	12
16	(Italy) Pasquale Di Sabatino	14	19†	22	16	17	15	13	12	12	15	12	15	15	17											12
17	(Macau) Jo Merszei																							17	13	4
18	(Spain) Isaac Tutumlu	Ret	17	16	11	Ret	DNS																			3
19	(Belgium) Andrea Barlesi	Ret	15	23	17	13	14																			3
20	(United States) Robb Holland																	13	16							2
21	(Macau) Felipe De Souza																					19	21	18†	14	2
22	(Macau) Henry Ho																							16	Ret	2
	(Macau) Célio Alves Dias																							19†	15	0
	(France) Hugo Valente																					16	18			0
	(Japan) Hiroki Yoshimoto																			16	19					0
	(Macau) Mak Ka Lok																							21†	16	0
	(Macau) Kin Veng Ng																					20	22	Ret	17	0
	(Germany) René Münnich																			17	20					0
	(Macau) Kelvin Leong																					17	Ret			0
	(Hong Kong) Eric Kwong																					18	20			0
	(Macau) Eurico de Jesus																							Ret	18	0
	(Italy) Kei Cozzolino																							20†	19†	0
	(Japan) Masaki Kano																			20	21					0
	(Macau) Alex Liu																					21	25†			0
	(Italy) Felice Tedeschi																	DNS	DNS							0
Pos	Driver	ITA (Italy)		ESP (Spain)		MAR (Morocco)		SVK (Slovakia)		HUN (Hungary)		AUT (Austria)		POR (Portugal)		BRA (Brazil)		USA (United States)		JPN (Japan)		CHN (China)		MAC (Macau)		Pts

Colour	Result
Gold	Winner
Silver	Second place
Bronze	Third place
Green	Points classification
Blue	Non-points classification
Blue	Non-classified finish (NC)
Purple	Retired, not classified (Ret)
Red	Did not qualify (DNQ)
Red	Did not pre-qualify (DNPQ)
Black	Disqualified (DSQ)
White	Did not start (DNS)
White	Withdrew (WD)
White	Race cancelled (C)
Blank	Did not practice (DNP)
Blank	Did not arrive (DNA)
Blank	Excluded (EX)

**Bold** – Pole
Italics – Fastest Lap

Eligibility for the Yokohama Drivers' Trophy was decided by Eurosport Events, taking into consideration the Team's CV and records, the Driver's CV and records and the car's technical characteristics.

===== Yokohama Teams' Trophy =====
Pos	Team	ITA (Italy)		ESP (Spain)		MAR (Morocco)		SVK (Slovakia)		HUN (Hungary)		AUT (Austria)		POR (Portugal)		BRA (Brazil)		USA (United States)		JPN (Japan)		CHN (China)		MAC (Macau)		Pts
1	(Russia) Lukoil Racing Team	3	Ret	2	9	11	11	1	3	14	6	4	14	2	16	4	3	4	3	4	3	5	6	4	7	182
1	(Russia) Lukoil Racing Team	18†	Ret	NC	12	16	Ret	2	15	Ret	16	19†	16	Ret	19†	11	10	Ret	18	18	8	NC	12	11	20†	182
2	(Italy) ROAL Motorsport	5	4	3	2	8	4	4	4	6	12	8	3	6	3	8	7	8	5	6	14	4	3	6	19†	178
2	(Italy) ROAL Motorsport	10	9	13	Ret	15	Ret	14	8	13	18	13	7	8	6	NC	Ret	Ret	13	Ret	15	7	9	20†	Ret	178
3	(Spain) Tuenti Racing Team	6	12	6	7	4	7	16†	5	5	4	5	4	7	2	10	9	6	6	7	2	22	16	14	10	146
3	(Spain) Tuenti Racing Team	Ret	18†	9	13	NC	9	Ret	Ret	8	5	7	Ret	9	8	16	14	16†	11	14	19	Ret	Ret	15	11	146
4	(United Kingdom) bamboo-engineering	8	7	15	14	12	15	12	12	9	11	6	15	10	7	5	6	5	7	5	9	NC	12	5	5	113
4	(United Kingdom) bamboo-engineering	14	19†	22	16	17	Ret	13	Ret	12	15	12	Ret	15	17	6	11	13	16	11	13	Ret	17	9	Ret	113
5	(Hungary) Zengő Motorsport	9	8	7	4	9	Ret	6	6	7	1	9	5	4	10	9	5	3	2	13	Ret	15	24	NC	21†	101
5	(Hungary) Zengő Motorsport	17†	11	17	Ret			9	Ret	10	17	15	12	Ret	12											101
6	(Germany) Wiechers-Sport	11	5	11	3	5	5	5	14	17	8	Ret	1	11	18	17	13	9	9	8	1	3	4	Ret	23†	90
7	(Germany) Liqui Moly Team Engstler	12	6	8	5	6	8	15	13	16	9	11	9	12	9	13	Ret	7	10	10	11	9	15	7	6	73
7	(Germany) Liqui Moly Team Engstler	15	Ret	18	19†	Ret	13	Ret	Ret	NC	Ret	14	13	18†	14	15	Ret	15	DSQ	20	17	10	23	17	13	73
8	(Italy) Proteam Racing	Ret	14	14	10	Ret	12	11	7	4	3	17	6	Ret	Ret	12	8	11	Ret	21	7	8	5	Ret	Ret	47
8	(Italy) Proteam Racing	Ret	17	16	11	Ret	DNS											DNS	DNS							47
9	(United Kingdom) Special Tuning Racing	DNS	DNS	10	Ret	10	10	7	9	NC	13	18†	DNS	13	13	7	12	10	8	12	12	12	8	10	9	39
9	(United Kingdom) Special Tuning Racing			20	Ret	14	DNS	8	11	Ret	DNS	Ret	DNS	14	Ret	19†	Ret	14	12	17	20					39
10	(Switzerland) SEAT Swiss Racing by SUNRED																					14	14	8	8	18
11	(United Kingdom) Team Aon	13	13	12	15	7	6	Ret	10	11	14	10	10	16	15	14	15	12	15	15	16	11	19	12	12	18
11	(United Kingdom) Team Aon	16	16	19	Ret	Ret	16†	Ret	DNS	15	19†	16	11	Ret	Ret	18	16†	17†	17	19	18	Ret	Ret	13	Ret	18
12	(United Kingdom) Team Aviva-Cofco																					6	7			9
	(Spain) Sunred Engineering	Ret	15	21	17	13	14															16	18			0
	(Spain) Sunred Engineering			23	18																					0
	China Dragon Racing																					19	21	18†	14	0
	China Dragon Racing																					20	22	19†	15	0
	(Macau) Five Auto Racing Team																							16	18	0
	(Macau) Five Auto Racing Team																							Ret	Ret	0
	(Macau) RPM Racing Team																							21†	16	0
	(Macau) Son Veng Racing Team																					17	Ret			0
	(Hong Kong) Look Fong Racing Team																					18	20			0
Pos	Team	ITA (Italy)		ESP (Spain)		MAR (Morocco)		SVK (Slovakia)		HUN (Hungary)		AUT (Austria)		POR (Portugal)		BRA (Brazil)		USA (United States)		JPN (Japan)		CHN (China)		MAC (Macau)		Pts

All the teams taking part in the championship were eligible to score points towards the Yokohama Teams' Trophy, with the exception of teams which incorporated a car manufacturer's name in the team's name.
