= FIA WTCC Race of Austria =

- Salzburgring (2012–2014)

Race information
- Number of times held: 3
- First held: 2012
- Last held: 2014
- Most wins (drivers): (France) Y. Muller (1) (Argentina) J.M. López (1) (Denmark) M. Nykjær (1) (United Kingdom) J. Nash (1) (United Kingdom) R. Huff (1) (Italy) S. D'Aste (1)
- Most wins (constructors): (United States) Chevrolet (3)

Last race (2014)
- Race 1 Winner: (France) Yvan Muller; (Citroën Total WTCC)
- Race 2 Winner: (Argentina) José María López; (Citroën Total WTCC)

The FIA WTCC Race of Austria was a round of the World Touring Car Championship that took place in Austria. It was first included on the calendar in 2012, when it was held at the Salzburgring. It was held at the venue three times.

Austria was left off the calendar for the 2015 World Touring Car Championship season as the series returns to neighbouring Germany.

== Winners ==
Year	Race	Driver	Manufacturer	Location	Report
2014	Race 1	(France) Yvan Muller	(France) Citroën	Salzburgring	Report
2014	Race 2	(Argentina) José María López	(France) Citroën	Salzburgring	Report
2013	Race 1	(Denmark) Michel Nykjær	(United States) Chevrolet	Salzburgring	Report
2013	Race 2	(United Kingdom) James Nash	(United States) Chevrolet	Salzburgring	Report
2012	Race 1	(United Kingdom) Robert Huff	(United States) Chevrolet	Salzburgring	Report
2012	Race 2	(Italy) Stefano D'Aste	(Germany) BMW	Salzburgring	Report
