= FIA WTCC Race of the United States =

- Sonoma Raceway (2012–2013)
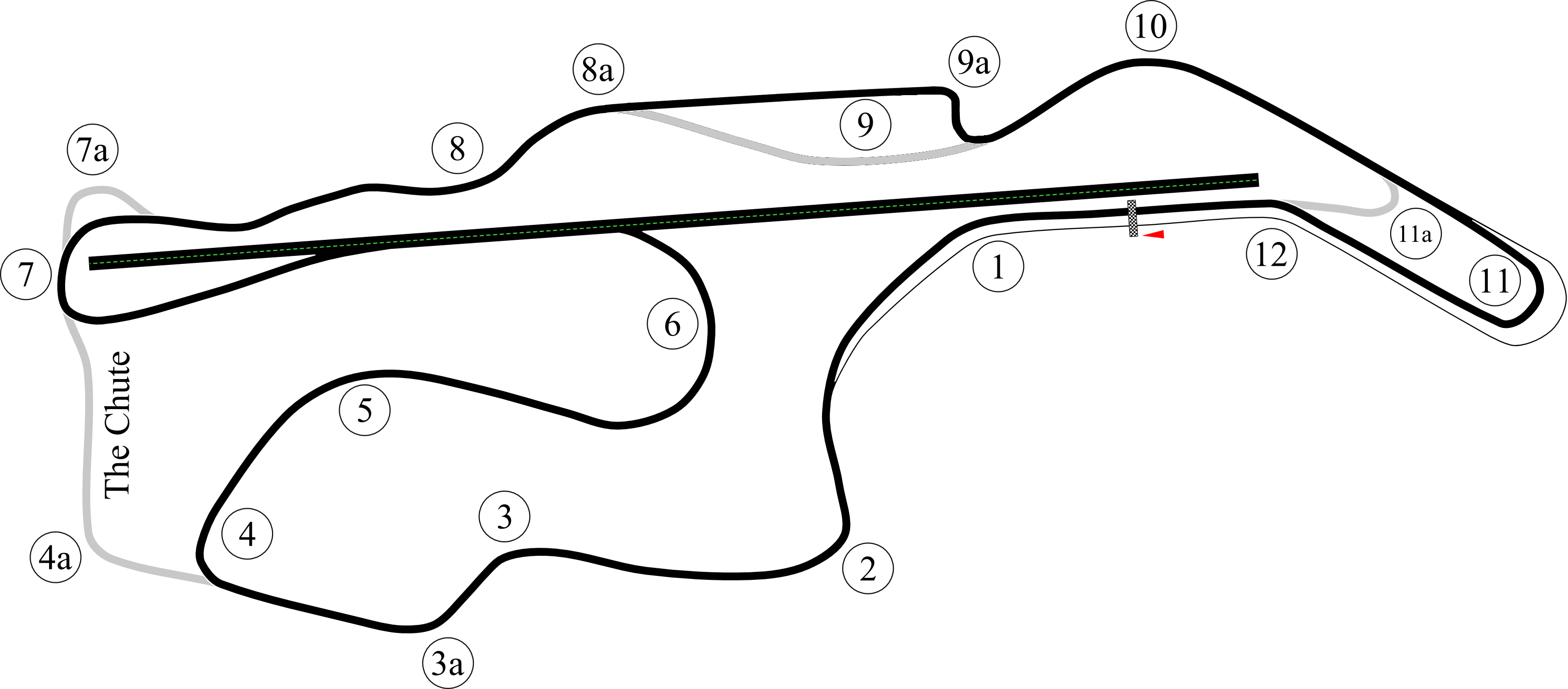

Race information
- Number of times held: 2
- First held: 2012
- Last held: 2013
- Most wins (drivers): (France) Y. Muller (1) (United Kingdom) R. Huff (1) (United Kingdom) T. Chilton (1) (Italy) G. Tarquini (1)
- Most wins (constructors): (United States) Chevrolet (3)

Last race (2013)
- Race 1 Winner: (United Kingdom) Tom Chilton; (RML)
- Race 2 Winner: (Italy) Gabriele Tarquini; (Castrol Honda Team)

The FIA WTCC Race of the United States was a round of the World Touring Car Championship, held at Sonoma Raceway in Sonoma, California. It was first held in the 2012 World Touring Car Championship season. Each race consists of 13 laps of the 4.025-kilometre (2.501 mi) circuit.

It was originally included in the schedule for the 2014 season but was dropped from the calendar in June 2014 due to logistical issues, to be replaced by an additional round in China.

For the event, the circuit was modified. It used the full circuit, but with the bus stop chicane replacing the esses.

== Winners ==
Year	Race	Driver	Manufacturer	Location	Report
2013	Race 1	(United Kingdom) Tom Chilton	(United States) Chevrolet	Sonoma	Report
2013	Race 2	(Italy) Gabriele Tarquini	(Japan) Honda	Sonoma	Report
2012	Race 1	(France) Yvan Muller	(United States) Chevrolet	Sonoma	Report
2012	Race 2	(United Kingdom) Robert Huff	(United States) Chevrolet	Sonoma	Report
