= 2012 FIA WTCC Race of Slovakia =

2012 Race of Slovakia
Race details
- Round 4 of 12 in the 2012 World Touring Car Championship at Automotodróm Slovakia Ring in Orechová Potôň, Slovakia.
- Date: 29 April, 2012
- Location: Orechová Potôň, Slovakia
- Course: Automotodróm Slovakia Ring; 5.922 kilometres (3.680 mi)

Race One
- Laps: 10
Pole position
Driver		(Hungary) Norbert Michelisz	Zengő Motorsport
Time		2:12.990	
Podium
First		(Italy) Gabriele Tarquini	Lukoil Racing Team
Second		(Russia) Aleksei Dudukalo	Lukoil Racing Team
Third		(Switzerland) Alain Menu	Chevrolet
Fastest Lap
Driver		(Hungary) Norbert Michelisz	Zengő Motorsport
Time		2:14.606	

Race Two
- Laps: 10
Podium
First		(United Kingdom) Robert Huff	Chevrolet
Second		(France) Yvan Muller	Chevrolet
Third		(Italy) Gabriele Tarquini	Lukoil Racing Team
Fastest Lap
Driver		(France) Yvan Muller	Chevrolet
Time		2:14.508	

The 2012 FIA WTCC Race of Slovakia was the fourth round of the 2012 World Touring Car Championship season and the maiden running of the FIA WTCC Race of Slovakia. It was held on 29 April 2012 at the Automotodróm Slovakia Ring in Orechová Potôň, Slovakia. The first race was won by Gabriele Tarquini for Lukoil Racing Team and the second race was won by Robert Huff for Chevrolet.

== Background ==
Chevrolet came to Slovakia on the back of winning the first six races of the season, with Yvan Muller leading the championship 24 points ahead of Alain Menu. Pepe Oriola was leading the Yokohama Independents' Trophy.

Gábor Wéber returned with Zengő Motorsport after missing the previous round in Morocco due to cost concerns. Isaac Tutumlu sat out the Race of Slovakia after his Proteam Racing team failed to repair his car in time after damage was sustained in Marrakech. SUNRED Engineering's Andrea Barlesi was unable to continue in the World Touring Car Championship after Marrakech with his budget having run out.

== Report ==
=== Free practice ===
Oriola was the quickest driver in the opening practice session on Friday, ahead of the Lukoil SEAT León of Tarquini and the Team Aon Ford Focus of James Nash. The session was briefly red flagged when the engine in Tiago Monteiro's León cut out.

It was Chevrolet's turn to top the times in the second free practice sessions, with Menu topping the times ahead of Yvan Muller. After the session had ended, Tarquini beached his car in the gravel having finished the session tenth fastest.

=== Qualifying ===
Norbert Michelisz took his first WTCC pole position to beat the Lukoil Racing Team drivers of Aleksei Dudukalo in second and Tarquini in third. A red flag towards the end of Q1 for Franz Engstler's stranded BMW 320 TC prevented Tom Coronel from progressing into the second session. Nash, who had qualified a career best fourth, failed a ride-height check in post-qualifying scrutineering and was dropped ten places on the grid for both races.

=== Warm-up ===
Muller led the Sunday morning warm-up session with Nash second, Huff third and Oriola fourth.

=== Race one ===
Michelisz led into the first corner but contact with second placed Tarquini would drop him down the order, and further contact with Muller dropped him down to sixth and earned the Chevrolet driver a drive-through penalty. Oriola had briefly climbed into second place before a puncture and the subsequent trip into the gravel ended his challenge. Tarquini led a Lukoil Racing Team 1-2 finish the chequered flag with Menu third for Chevrolet. Dudukalo was the winning driver in the Yokohama Independents' Trophy.

=== Race two ===
Stefano D'Aste started on the reversed grid pole and led down into turn one. The Chevrolet trio and Tarquini took the lead when the Wiechers-Sport driver ran wide. Dudukalo was issued with a drive through penalty for failing to have all four wheels on his car on the ground when the five-minute board was shown before the race. Huff led Muller and Menu until Tarquini took his third place. ROAL Motorsport's Tom Coronel also overtook Menu before the Swiss retired with a broken rim. Huff took his first win of the year ahead of Muller and Tarquini, with Oriola the winner in the Yokohama Independents' Trophy.

== Results ==
=== Qualifying ===
Pos.	No.	Name	Team	Car	C	Q1	Q2	Points
1	5	(Hungary) Norbert Michelisz	Zengő Motorsport	BMW 320 TC	Y	2:14.148	2:12.990	**5**
2	4	(Russia) Aleksei Dudukalo	Lukoil Racing	SEAT León WTCC	Y	2:13.975	2:13.076	**4**
3	3	(Italy) Gabriele Tarquini	Lukoil Racing	SEAT León WTCC		2:14.414	2:13.137	**3**
4^{1}	14	(United Kingdom) James Nash	Team Aon	Ford Focus S2000 TC		2:13.540	2:13.317	**2**
5	18	(Portugal) Tiago Monteiro	Tuenti Racing	SR León 1.6T		2:14.030	2:13.322	**1**
6	1	(France) Yvan Muller	Chevrolet	Chevrolet Cruze 1.6T		2:13.621	2:13.366	
7	2	(United Kingdom) Robert Huff	Chevrolet	Chevrolet Cruze 1.6T		2:13.725	2:13.575	
8	74	(Spain) Pepe Oriola	Tuenti Racing	SEAT León WTCC	Y	2:13.301	2:13.684	
9	8	(Switzerland) Alain Menu	Chevrolet	Chevrolet Cruze 1.6T		2:13.790	2:13.721	
10	26	(Italy) **Stefano D'Aste**	Wiechers-Sport	BMW 320 TC	Y	2:14.166	2:14.668	
11	23	(United Kingdom) Tom Chilton	Team Aon	Ford Focus S2000 TC		2:14.447	2:14.766	
12	16	(Italy) Alberto Cerqui	ROAL Motorsport	BMW 320 TC	Y	2:14.331	2:15.288	
13	15	(Netherlands) Tom Coronel	ROAL Motorsport	BMW 320 TC		2:14.490		
14	6	(Germany) Franz Engstler	Liqui Moly Team Engstler	BMW 320 TC	Y	2:14.676		
15	25	(Morocco) Mehdi Bennani	Proteam Racing	BMW 320 TC	Y	2:14.823		
16	20	(China) Darryl O'Young	Special Tuning Racing	SEAT León WTCC	Y	2:14.856		
17	11	(United Kingdom) Alex MacDowall	bamboo-engineering	Chevrolet Cruze 1.6T	Y	2:15.039		
18	12	(Italy) Pasquale Di Sabatino	bamboo-engineering	Chevrolet Cruze 1.6T	Y	2:15.756		
19	7	(Hong Kong) Charles Ng	Liqui Moly Team Engstler	BMW 320 TC	Y	2:16.129		
20	27	(Hungary) Gábor Wéber	Zengő Motorsport	BMW 320 TC	Y	2:16.536		
NC^{2}	22	(United Kingdom) Tom Boardman	Special Tuning Racing	SEAT León TDi	Y	13:11.823		

- **Bold** denotes Pole position for second race.

^1 — James Nash received a ten place grid penalty for failing a post-qualifying ride height check.
^2 — Despite not having classified in qualifying, Tom Boardman was allowed to start at the back of the grid for both races.

=== Race 1 ===
Pos.	No.	Name	Team	Car	C	Laps	Time/Retired	Grid	Points
1	3	(Italy) Gabriele Tarquini	Lukoil Racing	SEAT León WTCC		10	22:42.275	3	25
2	4	(Russia) Aleksei Dudukalo	Lukoil Racing	SEAT León WTCC	Y	10	+2.484	2	18
3	8	(Switzerland) Alain Menu	Chevrolet	Chevrolet Cruze 1.6T		10	+4.194	8	15
4	16	(Italy) Alberto Cerqui	ROAL Motorsport	BMW 320 TC	Y	10	+6.992	11	12
5	26	(Italy) Stefano D'Aste	Wiechers-Sport	BMW 320 TC	Y	10	+7.978	9	10
6	5	(Hungary) **Norbert Michelisz**	Zengő Motorsport	BMW 320 TC	Y	10	+9.943	1	8
7	20	(China) Darryl O'Young	Special Tuning Racing	SEAT León WTCC	Y	10	+11.164	15	6
8	22	(United Kingdom) Tom Boardman	Special Tuning Racing	SEAT León TDi	Y	10	+20.643	21	4
9	27	(Hungary) Gábor Wéber	Zengő Motorsport	BMW 320 TC	Y	10	+20.961	19	2
10	1	(France) Yvan Muller	Chevrolet	Chevrolet Cruze 1.6T		10	+21.174	5	1
11	25	(Morocco) Mehdi Bennani	Proteam Racing	BMW 320 TC	Y	10	+21.787	20	
12	11	(United Kingdom) Alex MacDowall	bamboo-engineering	Chevrolet Cruze 1.6T	Y	10	+22.676	16	
13	12	(Italy) Pasquale Di Sabatino	bamboo-engineering	Chevrolet Cruze 1.6T	Y	10	+31.153	17	
14	15	(Netherlands) Tom Coronel	ROAL Motorsport	BMW 320 TC		10	+41.395	12	
15	7	(Hong Kong) Charles Ng	Liqui Moly Team Engstler	BMW 320 TC	Y	10	+1:42.494	18	
16	74	(Spain) Pepe Oriola	Tuenti Racing	SEAT León WTCC	Y	7	+3 Laps	7	
17	2	(United Kingdom) Robert Huff	Chevrolet	Chevrolet Cruze 1.6T		7	+3 Laps	6	
Ret	6	(Germany) Franz Engstler	Liqui Moly Team Engstler	BMW 320 TC	Y	5	Race incident	13	
Ret	18	(Portugal) Tiago Monteiro	Tuenti Racing	SR León 1.6T		1	Race incident	4	
Ret	23	(United Kingdom) Tom Chilton	Team Aon	Ford Focus S2000 TC		0	Race incident	10	
Ret	14	(United Kingdom) James Nash	Team Aon	Ford Focus S2000 TC		0	Race incident	14	

- **Bold** denotes Fastest lap.

=== Race 2 ===
Pos.	No.	Name	Team	Car	C	Laps	Time/Retired	Grid	Points
1	2	(United Kingdom) Robert Huff	Chevrolet	Chevrolet Cruze 1.6T		10	22:38.101	4	25
2	1	(France) **Yvan Muller**	Chevrolet	Chevrolet Cruze 1.6T		10	+2.029	5	18
3	3	(Italy) Gabriele Tarquini	Lukoil Racing	SEAT León WTCC		10	+2.555	7	15
4	15	(Netherlands) Tom Coronel	ROAL Motorsport	BMW 320 TC		10	+8.859	12	12
5	74	(Spain) Pepe Oriola	Tuenti Racing	SEAT León WTCC	Y	10	+9.352	3	10
6	5	(Hungary) Norbert Michelisz	Zengő Motorsport	BMW 320 TC	Y	10	+9.553	9	8
7	25	(Morocco) Mehdi Bennani	Proteam Racing	BMW 320 TC	Y	10	+11.675	13	6
8	16	(Italy) Alberto Cerqui	ROAL Motorsport	BMW 320 TC	Y	10	+12.773	11	4
9	20	(China) Darryl O'Young	Special Tuning Racing	SEAT León WTCC	Y	10	+14.161	14	2
10	23	(United Kingdom) Tom Chilton	Team Aon	Ford Focus S2000 TC		10	+20.847	10	1
11	22	(United Kingdom) Tom Boardman	Special Tuning Racing	SEAT León TDi	Y	10	+30.073	17	
12	12	(Italy) Pasquale Di Sabatino	bamboo-engineering	Chevrolet Cruze 1.6T	Y	10	+30.617	16	
13	6	(Germany) Franz Engstler	Liqui Moly Team Engstler	BMW 320 TC	Y	10	+30.964	18	
14	26	(Italy) Stefano D'Aste	Wiechers-Sport	BMW 320 TC	Y	10	+32.757	1	
15	4	(Russia) Aleksei Dudukalo	Lukoil Racing	SEAT León WTCC	Y	10	+41.317	8	
Ret	18	(Portugal) Tiago Monteiro	Tuenti Racing	SR León 1.6T		6	Engine	6	
Ret	8	(Switzerland) Alain Menu	Chevrolet	Chevrolet Cruze 1.6T		3	Race incident	2	
Ret	11	(United Kingdom) Alex MacDowall	bamboo-engineering	Chevrolet Cruze 1.6T	Y	2	Race incident	15	
Ret	27	(Hungary) Gábor Wéber	Zengő Motorsport	BMW 320 TC	Y	1	Race incident	20	
DNS	7	(Hong Kong) Charles Ng	Liqui Moly Team Engstler	BMW 320 TC	Y	0	Collision damage	19	
DNS	14	(United Kingdom) James Nash	Team Aon	Ford Focus S2000 TC		0	Collision damage	WD	

- **Bold** denotes Fastest lap.

== Standings after the round ==
Drivers' Championship standings

	Pos	Driver	Points
	1	(France) Yvan Muller	149
	2	(United Kingdom) Robert Huff	122
	3	(Switzerland) Alain Menu	121
	4	(Netherlands) Tom Coronel	89
1	5	(Italy) Gabriele Tarquini	87

Yokohama Independents' Trophy standings

	Pos	Driver	Points
	1	(Spain) Pepe Oriola	62
	2	(Italy) Stefano D'Aste	53
1	3	(Hungary) Norbert Michelisz	47
1	4	(Germany) Franz Engstler	38
2	5	(Italy) Alberto Cerqui	25

Manufacturers' Championship standings

	Pos	Manufacturer	Points
	1	(United States) Chevrolet	337
1	2	(Spain) SEAT Racing Technology	219
1	3	(Germany) BMW Customer Racing Teams	208

- Note: Only the top five positions are included for both sets of drivers' standings.
