= 2012 FIA WTCC Race of Austria =

2012 Race of Austria
Race details
- Round 6 of 12 in the 2012 World Touring Car Championship at Salzburgring in Salzburg, Austria.
- Date: May 20, 2012
- Location: Salzburg, Austria
- Course: Salzburgring; 4.225 kilometres (2.625 mi)

Race One
- Laps: 12
Pole position
Driver		(United Kingdom) Robert Huff	Chevrolet
Time		1:26.791	
Podium
First		(United Kingdom) Robert Huff	Chevrolet
Second		(France) Yvan Muller	Chevrolet
Third		(Switzerland) Alain Menu	Chevrolet
Fastest Lap
Driver		(France) Yvan Muller	Chevrolet
Time		1:28.340	

Race Two
- Laps: 12
Podium
First		(Italy) Stefano D'Aste	Wiechers-Sport
Second		(United Kingdom) Robert Huff	Chevrolet
Third		(Netherlands) Tom Coronel	ROAL Motorsport
Fastest Lap
Driver		(Switzerland) Alain Menu	Chevrolet
Time		1:27.820	

The 2012 FIA WTCC Race of Austria was the sixth round of the 2012 World Touring Car Championship season and the inaugural running of the FIA WTCC Race of Austria. It was held on May 20, 2012 at the Salzburgring, east of Salzburg in Austria. The first race was won by Robert Huff for Chevrolet and the second race was won by Stefano D'Aste for Wiechers-Sport.

== Background ==
Yvan Muller came into the event leading the championship 23 points clear of Alain Menu, who was in turn seven points ahead of Robert Huff. Gabriele Tarquini was the leading non-Chevrolet driver, 53 points behind Huff in the standings. Pepe Oriola was leading the Yokohama Independents' Trophy.

== Report ==
=== Free Practice ===
Alain Menu led a Chevrolet 1-2-3 in the opening practice session, with Tom Coronel for ROAL Motorsport fourth quickest.

Menu set the pace once again in the second practice session, with Muller and Huff once again making it a 1-2-3 for Chevrolet. Pasquale di Sabatino surprised by finishing fourth fastest for bamboo-engineering.

=== Qualifying ===
Huff took pole position ahead of his Chevrolet teammates. Tom Chilton and Franz Engstler made contact in Q1, with BMW of Engstler spinning into the gravel and bringing the red flag out. Tarquini was the fastest non-Chevrolet driver and Alex MacDowall was the fastest independent. Aleksei Dudukalo would take pole position for the reversed grid race. Chilton received a five-place grid penalty for his collision with Engstler.

=== Warm-Up ===
Four Chevrolets finished morning warm-up at the top of the times, with Muller setting a time faster than Huff's pole position time. Muller finished the session on top ahead of Menu, Huff and MacDowall.

=== Race One ===
At a circuit where slipstreaming is important, Muller trailed Huff for the whole race to benefit from the tow. Further back, Special Tuning Racing's Darryl O'Young and Engstler Motorsport's Charles Ng tangled, with O'Young requiring attention at the circuit medical centre which would render him unable to start the second race. Huff took his 20th WTCC win ahead of Muller and Menu, Tarquini finished as best of the rest in fourth. MacDowall was the winning independent.

=== Race Two ===
Dudukalo started on pole position for a race which would be known for its multiple tyre issues. Both Dudukalo and his Lukoil Racing Team teammate Tarquini had to pit for fresh rubber due to punctures and Tiago Monteiro retired following a left-front puncture. After this, the three Chevrolets led until Menu went into the gravel on lap eight with a puncture. Shortly after, race one independent winner MacDowall also had a puncture and stopped in the gravel next to Menu's stranded car. The remaining Chevrolets of Muller and Huff comfortably led the BMW pair of Coronel and D'Aste until the final lap when Muller went off at turn 10 with a puncture and Huff suffered a puncture at the final corner. Coronel tried to go up the inside of Huff without success, allowing D'Aste to overtake the pair of them and take the win. Huff held off Coronel despite his puncture to take second.

== Results ==
=== Qualifying ===
Pos.	No.	Name	Team	Car	C	Q1	Q2	Points
1	2	(United Kingdom) Robert Huff	Chevrolet	Chevrolet Cruze 1.6T		1:27.683	1:26.791	**5**
2	1	(France) Yvan Muller	Chevrolet	Chevrolet Cruze 1.6T		1:27.346	1:26.933	**4**
3	8	(Switzerland) Alain Menu	Chevrolet	Chevrolet Cruze 1.6T		1:27.501	1:26.961	**3**
4	3	(Italy) Gabriele Tarquini	Lukoil Racing	SEAT León WTCC		1:28.162	1:27.490	**2**
5	11	(United Kingdom) Alex MacDowall	bamboo-engineering	Chevrolet Cruze 1.6T	Y	1:27.813	1:27.573	**1**
6	18	(Portugal) Tiago Monteiro	Tuenti Racing	SR León 1.6T		1:28.406	1:27.808	
7	26	(Italy) Stefano D'Aste	Wiechers-Sport	BMW 320 TC	Y	1:28.392	1:27.927	
8	74	(Spain) Pepe Oriola	Tuenti Racing	SEAT León WTCC	Y	1:28.100	1:28.122	
9	15	(Netherlands) Tom Coronel	ROAL Motorsport	BMW 320 TC		1:28.149	1:28.124	
10	4	(Russia) **Aleksei Dudukalo**	Lukoil Racing	SEAT León WTCC	Y	1:28.298	1:28.317	
11	20	(China) Darryl O'Young	Special Tuning Racing	SEAT León WTCC	Y	1:28.364	1:28.342	
12	25	(Morocco) Mehdi Bennani	Proteam Racing	BMW 320 TC	Y	1:28.293	1:28.373	
13	14	(United Kingdom) James Nash	Team Aon	Ford Focus S2000 TC		1:28.421		
14	16	(Italy) Alberto Cerqui	ROAL Motorsport	BMW 320 TC	Y	1:28.424		
15	5	(Hungary) Norbert Michelisz	Zengő Motorsport	BMW 320 TC	Y	1:28.582		
16	12	(Italy) Pasquale Di Sabatino	bamboo-engineering	Chevrolet Cruze 1.6T	Y	1:28.858		
17	6	(Germany) Franz Engstler	Liqui Moly Team Engstler	BMW 320 TC	Y	1:28.913		
18	7	(Hong Kong) Charles Ng	Liqui Moly Team Engstler	BMW 320 TC	Y	1:29.137		
19	23	(United Kingdom) Tom Chilton	Team Aon	Ford Focus S2000 TC		1:29.271		
20	22	(United Kingdom) Tom Boardman	Special Tuning Racing	SEAT León TDi	Y	1:30.057		
21	27	(Hungary) Gábor Wéber	Zengő Motorsport	BMW 320 TC	Y	1:30.116		

- **Bold** denotes Pole position for second race.

=== Race 1 ===
Pos.	No.	Name	Team	Car	C	Laps	Time/Retired	Grid	Points
1	2	(United Kingdom) Robert Huff	Chevrolet	Chevrolet Cruze 1.6T		14	23:26.809	1	25
2	1	(France) **Yvan Muller**	Chevrolet	Chevrolet Cruze 1.6T		14	+0.312	2	18
3	8	(Switzerland) Alain Menu	Chevrolet	Chevrolet Cruze 1.6T		14	+0.739	3	15
4	3	(Italy) Gabriele Tarquini	Lukoil Racing	SEAT León WTCC		14	+2.919	4	12
5	18	(Portugal) Tiago Monteiro	Tuenti Racing	SR León 1.6T		14	+3.483	6	10
6	11	(United Kingdom) Alex MacDowall	bamboo-engineering	Chevrolet Cruze 1.6T	Y	14	+3.774	5	8
7	74	(Spain) Pepe Oriola	Tuenti Racing	SEAT León WTCC	Y	14	+4.741	8	6
8	15	(Netherlands) Tom Coronel	ROAL Motorsport	BMW 320 TC		14	+6.923	9	4
9	5	(Hungary) Norbert Michelisz	Zengő Motorsport	BMW 320 TC	Y	14	+8.419	15	2
10	14	(United Kingdom) James Nash	Team Aon	Ford Focus S2000 TC		14	+8.914	13	1
11	6	(Germany) Franz Engstler	Liqui Moly Team Engstler	BMW 320 TC	Y	14	+9.796	17	
12	12	(Italy) Pasquale Di Sabatino	bamboo-engineering	Chevrolet Cruze 1.6T	Y	14	+10.429	16	
13	16	(Italy) Alberto Cerqui	ROAL Motorsport	BMW 320 TC	Y	14	+12.813	14	
14	7	(Hong Kong) Charles Ng	Liqui Moly Team Engstler	BMW 320 TC	Y	14	+13.178	18	
15	27	(Hungary) Gábor Wéber	Zengő Motorsport	BMW 320 TC	Y	14	+13.983	20	
16	23	(United Kingdom) Tom Chilton	Team Aon	Ford Focus S2000 TC		14	+16.756	21	
17	25	(Morocco) Mehdi Bennani	Proteam Racing	BMW 320 TC	Y	14	+18.390	12	
18	22	(United Kingdom) Tom Boardman	Special Tuning Racing	SEAT León TDi	Y	14	+1 Lap	19	
19	4	(Russia) Aleksei Dudukalo	Lukoil Racing	SEAT León WTCC	Y	14	+3 Laps	10	
Ret	26	(Italy) Stefano D'Aste	Wiechers-Sport	BMW 320 TC	Y	5	Collision	7	
Ret	20	(China) Darryl O'Young	Special Tuning Racing	SEAT León WTCC	Y	4	Collision	11	

- **Bold** denotes Fastest lap.

=== Race 2 ===
Pos.	No.	Name	Team	Car	C	Laps	Time/Retired	Grid	Points
1	26	(Italy) Stefano D'Aste	Wiechers-Sport	BMW 320 TC	Y	12	17:58.529	4	25
2	2	(United Kingdom) Robert Huff	Chevrolet	Chevrolet Cruze 1.6T		12	+0.377	10	18
3	15	(Netherlands) Tom Coronel	ROAL Motorsport	BMW 320 TC		12	+0.494	2	15
4	74	(Spain) Pepe Oriola	Tuenti Racing	SEAT León WTCC	Y	12	+4.103	3	12
5	5	(Hungary) Norbert Michelisz	Zengő Motorsport	BMW 320 TC	Y	12	+4.929	14	10
6	25	(Morocco) Mehdi Bennani	Proteam Racing	BMW 320 TC	Y	12	+5.432	11	8
7	16	(Italy) Alberto Cerqui	ROAL Motorsport	BMW 320 TC	Y	12	+5.786	13	6
8	1	(France) Yvan Muller	Chevrolet	Chevrolet Cruze 1.6T		12	+6.464	9	4
9	6	(Germany) Franz Engstler	Liqui Moly Team Engstler	BMW 320 TC	Y	12	+6.474	16	2
10	14	(United Kingdom) James Nash	Team Aon	Ford Focus S2000 TC		12	+9.056	12	1
11	23	(United Kingdom) Tom Chilton	Team Aon	Ford Focus S2000 TC		12	+12.980	18	
12	27	(Hungary) Gábor Wéber	Zengő Motorsport	BMW 320 TC	Y	12	+15.659	19	
13	7	(Hong Kong) Charles Ng	Liqui Moly Team Engstler	BMW 320 TC	Y	12	+37.399	17	
14	4	(Russia) Aleksei Dudukalo	Lukoil Racing	SEAT León WTCC	Y	11	+1 Lap	1	
15	12	(Italy) Pasquale Di Sabatino	bamboo-engineering	Chevrolet Cruze 1.6T	Y	11	+1 Lap	15	
16	3	(Italy) Gabriele Tarquini	Lukoil Racing	SEAT León WTCC		11	+1 Lap	7	
Ret	8	(Switzerland) **Alain Menu**	Chevrolet	Chevrolet Cruze 1.6T		7	Puncture	8	
Ret	11	(United Kingdom) Alex MacDowall	bamboo-engineering	Chevrolet Cruze 1.6T	Y	7	Puncture	6	
Ret	18	(Portugal) Tiago Monteiro	Tuenti Racing	SR León 1.6T		7	Puncture	5	
DNS	20	(Hong Kong) Darryl O'Young	Special Tuning Racing	SEAT León WTCC	Y	0	Injury		
DNS	22	(United Kingdom) Tom Boardman	Special Tuning Racing	SEAT León TDi	Y	0	Transmission		

- **Bold** denotes Fastest lap.

== Standings after the round ==
Drivers' Championship standings

	Pos	Driver	Points
	1	(France) Yvan Muller	206
1	2	(United Kingdom) Robert Huff	198
1	3	(Switzerland) Alain Menu	175
1	4	(Netherlands) Tom Coronel	116
1	5	(Italy) Gabriele Tarquini	111

Yokohama Independents' Trophy standings

Pos	Driver	Points
1	(Spain) Pepe Oriola	90
2	(Hungary) Norbert Michelisz	80
3	(Italy) Stefano D'Aste	69
4	(Germany) Franz Engstler	50
5	(Morocco) Mehdi Bennani	41

Manufacturers' Championship standings

Pos	Manufacturer	Points
1	(United States) Chevrolet	495
2	(Germany) BMW Customer Racing Teams	335
3	(Spain) SEAT Racing Technology	316

- Note: Only the top five positions are included for both sets of drivers' standings.
