= Ford Focus (third generation) =

Third generation of Ford Focus

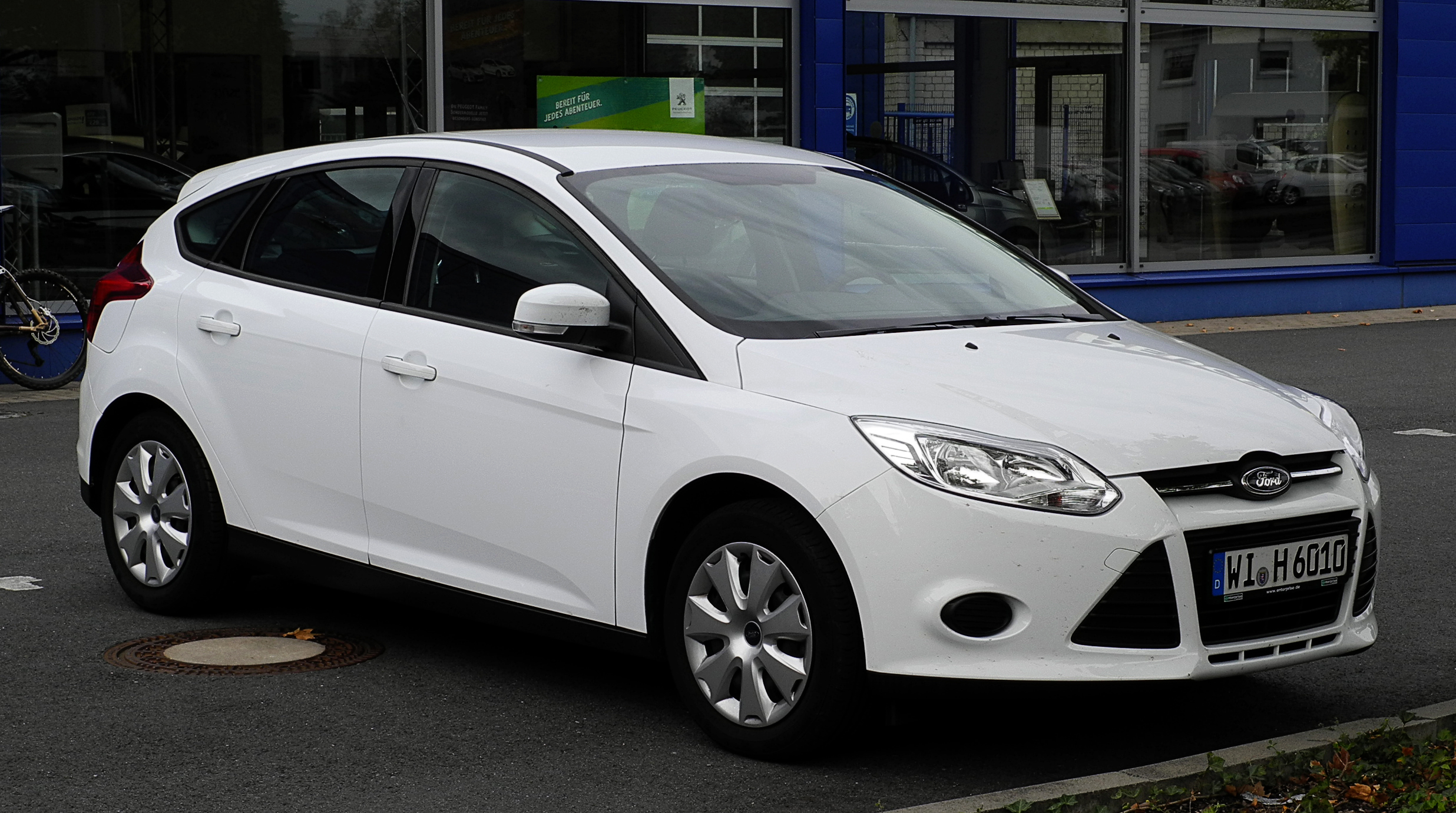

Overview
- Manufacturer: Ford
- Model code: C346; LW (2011–2015, Australia); LZ (2015–2018, Australia)
- Production: December 2010 – 2019
- Model years: 2011–2018 (Europe); 2012–2019 (North/South America)
- Assembly: Germany: Saarlouis (SB&A); United States: Wayne, Michigan (Michigan Assembly Plant); Thailand: Rayong (FTM); China: Chongqing and Harbin (Changan Ford); Taiwan: Taoyuan (Ford Lio Ho); Argentina: General Pacheco (FMA); Russia: Vsevolozhsk (Ford Sollers)
- Designer: Martin Smith, Stefan Lamm, Murat Güler (2008) Kemal Curić (wagon/5 door: 2008); Todd Willing (sedan: 2009) Tiago Dias, Ernst Reim (interior: 2008)

Body and chassis
- Class: Compact car / small family car (C)
- Body style: 5-door hatchback 4-door sedan 5-door station wagon
- Layout: Front-engine, front-wheel-drive or four-wheel-drive (Focus RS only)
- Platform: Ford global C-car platform
- Related: Ford C-Max (Second generation); Ford Kuga (Second generation); Ford Escape (Third generation); Lincoln MKC

Powertrain
- Engine: Petrol: 1.0 L EcoBoost I3; 1.5 L EcoBoost I4; 1.6 L Duratec Ti-VCT I4; 1.6 L EcoBoost I4; 2.0 L Duratec Ti-VCT I4 GDI; 2.0 L EcoBoost I4 (ST); 2.3 L EcoBoost I4 (RS); Diesel: 1.6 L Duratorq TDCi I4; 1.5 L Duratorq TDCi I4; 2.0 L Duratorq TDCi I4
- Transmission: 5-speed iB5 manual; 5-speed MTX-75 manual; 6-speed MMT6 B6 manual (ST, standard in LZ); 6-speed 6F15 automatic (1.0 L EcoBoost & 1.5 L EcoBoost); 6-speed PowerShift DCT

Dimensions
- Wheelbase: 2,648 mm (104.3 in)
- Length: 4,358 mm (171.6 in) (hatchback); 4,534 mm (178.5 in) (sedan); 4,556 mm (179.4 in) (wagon/estate)
- Width: 1,823 mm (71.8 in)
- Height: 1,484 mm (58.4 in) (sedan, hatchback); 1,505 mm (59.3 in) (wagon)
- Curb weight: 1,270–1,471 kg (2,800–3,243 lb); RS: 1,569 kg (3,459 lb)

Chronology
- Predecessor: Ford Focus (second generation, North America); Ford Focus (second generation, Europe)
- Successor: Ford Focus (fourth generation)

The Ford Focus (third generation), also known as the Focus Mk III, (Code name: C346) debuted at the 2010 North American International Auto Show as a 2012 model. The cars shown were a 4-door sedan and 5-door hatchback, also debuting a new 2.0-litre direct injection I4 engine. A 5-door estate (wagon) was previewed at the Geneva Motor Show a month later.

This generation of Focus would be the first Ford vehicle designed under the tenure of CEO Alan Mulally and his "One Ford" plan, which aimed to leverage Ford's global resources into creating more competitive vehicles that could be sold globally in each segment with minimal changes.

The "One Ford" plan would reunite the North American and global Focus line. The previous North American version was thus discontinued, and the new model was launched simultaneously in North America and Europe on March 2, 2011, both having started production near the end of 2010. Production in Asia, Africa, and South America followed later.

Ford debuted the all-electric Ford Focus Electric at the Consumer Electronics Show in 2011 to compete with the Nissan Leaf and the Chevrolet Volt and announced the hot hatch ST model at the Paris Motor Show in September 2010.

The Ford Focus was the best-selling car in the world for 2012.

The third generation Focus originally was intended to spawn a compact sedan that was to be sold by the Mercury division, following Ford confirming its 2012 lineups with its dealers. While not officially confirmed by Ford, two Mercury dealers stated that the car would be sold as the Mercury Tracer. It would've given Mercury two sedans again following the discontinuation of the Grand Marquis after the 2011 model year, and would've slotted below the larger Milan. It was to go on sale in 2011 for the 2012 model year. The plans for the new Tracer, however, were scrapped after Ford announced the closure of the Mercury division in the summer of 2010.

== Design ==
The design was built on Ford's Kinetic Design. The lights at the front have a different shape. The trapezoidal grille has triangular features. At the rear, the hatchback tail lights are positioned lower, similar to the Ford Fiesta. The interior has been changed from the second generation in the NA and International versions. Ford wanted to make the Focus more upmarket so it offers two types of central consoles: the basic is associated with smaller engines and the premium is available to more powerful engines.

This generation of Focus incorporated a redesigned cabin, changed materials, and a new "infotainment" system. Following the industry trend towards contending, and in keeping with the sedan's downmarket "economy car" image vs. the "premium" hatchback, the earlier sedan's space-saving gas strut trunk hinges are replaced with cheaper, intrusive gooseneck hinges. The Focus also has Ford's patented capless fuel tank, which doesn't require a cap to prevent siphoning.

In designing the Ford Focus, a group of young designers used what's called the Third Age Suit in order to simulate the physical limitations of an elderly person. The suit, which restricts the wearer's movements, allowed for insights that were implemented into the car's design.

== Production ==
The Focus was promoted as a global car, built in several different factories around the world, with changes to engine line-ups and trim levels to suit regional markets and regulations. Production locations include:

- Saarlouis, Germany, production commenced December 2010 for the European market.
- Wayne, Michigan, United States, production started in February 2011 for North America and Chile.
- Vsevolozhsk (St Petersburg), Russia, production commences in July 2011, with the estate (wagon) model starting in January 2012.
- Rayong, Thailand, commenced May 2012 for the Asian and Australasia markets, and replaces the previous Philippines plant used for the last generation Focus.
- Chongqing, China started production of the Focus for the Chinese market in May 2012.
- Taoyuan, Taiwan started production of the Focus for the Taiwanese market in November 2012.
- General Pacheco, Argentina started production of the Focus for most of the South American market in 2013.

== Transmission reliability issues ==
Along with the Ford Fiesta, the Focus equipped with the Ford DPS6 PowerShift transmission has received much criticism due to transmission shuddering, including several lemon law claims. The issue is due to the dry type clutches associated with petrol models. Ford's current response is to replace the clutch pack assembly (with updated parts) when shuddering exceeds 250 rpm (upon customer complaint).

There have been at least 6 revisions of clutch packs and transmission control modules since inception. Newer clutch packs and transmissions are more resistant to wear and fluid contamination, as the source of many shudder issues involved an improperly installed seal which was leaking transmission fluid onto the dry clutches. Ford also claims there are "Changes to the clutch material for better performance across temperature ranges (new for 2016)." Some consumer complaints are due to the normal operating characteristics of the transmission, because the DPS6 does not contain a torque converter fluid coupling and does not behave similarly to traditional torque converter transmissions, instead sharing some characteristics found in traditional manual transmissions.

== North American market ==
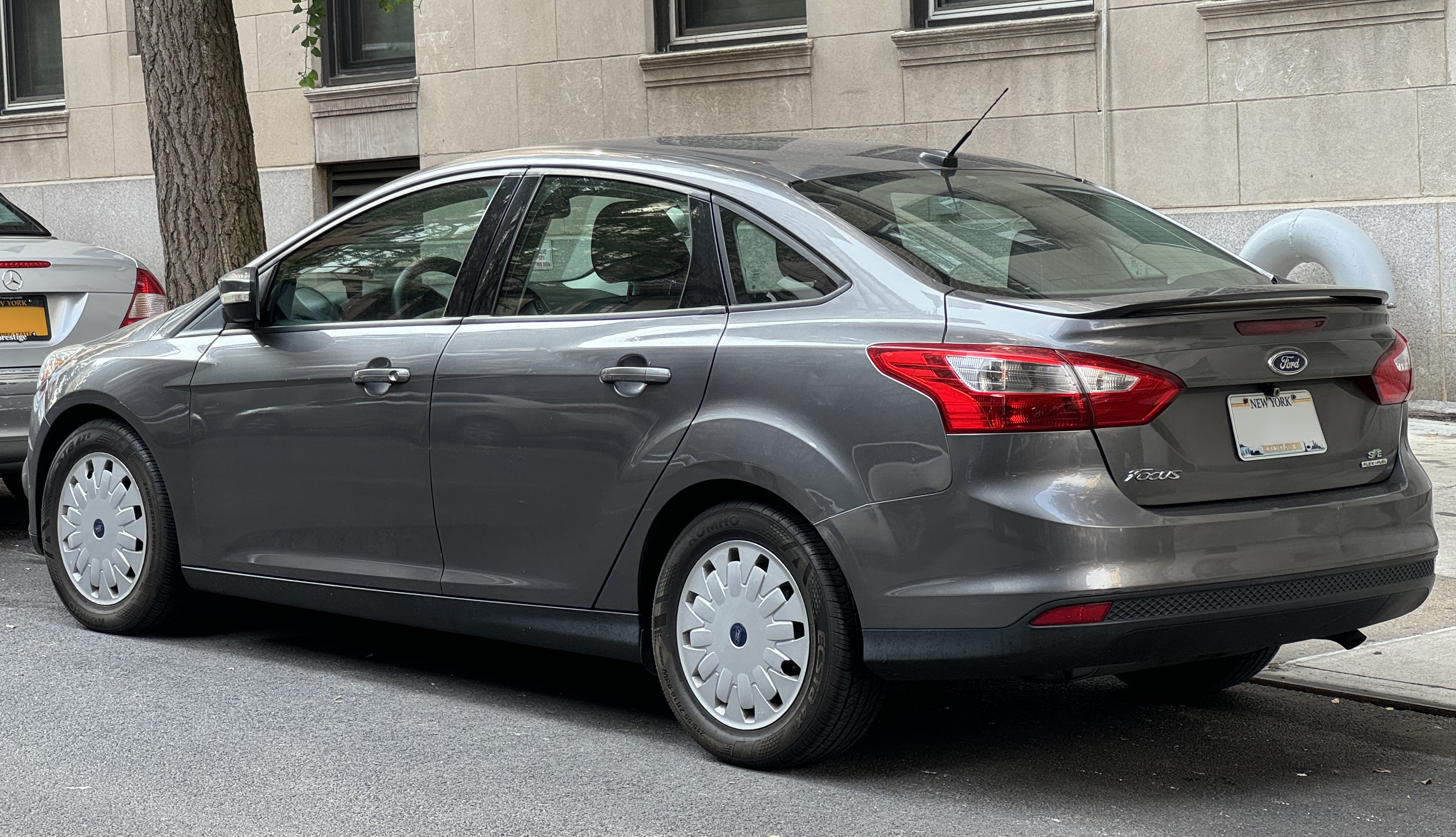
The Ford Focus SFE, note hubcaps and rear spoiler (2013)

Like in most other non-European markets, only the 4-door sedan and 5-door hatchback are offered in the United States and Canada. The EPA rated fuel economy at 28 city/38 hwy MPG for the 6-speed automatic, and 26 city/ 36 hwy MPG for the 5-speed manual. The SFE package ("Super Fuel Economy"), which was only available as an add-on to the SE sedan with PowerShift automatic dual-clutch transmission, improves highway fuel economy to 40 MPG. The SFE used various fuel-saving aerodynamic items developed for the Focus ECOnetic such as a rear spoiler, low rolling-resistance tyres on 16-inch steel wheels with aerodynamic hubcaps and active grille shutters. The platform that the new Focus is based on is 25% stronger than the previous North American version.

=== Engine lineup in North America ===
The Focus was launched with only one engine option, a 2.0-litre Duratec 20 direct injected, Ti-VCT 4-cylinder, producing 160 hp (119 kW). Mid-2012, Flex Fuel capability was added, except for states in the United States that adhere to partial zero-emissions vehicle regulations. The engine is a derivative of the port fuel-injected 2.0-litre engine in the previous generation Focus. In late 2012, the range was joined by the Focus ST, with a turbocharged 2.0-litre producing 252 hp (188 kW) and 270 lb⋅ft (366 N⋅m) of torque (available only with a 6-speed manual transmission).

For the 2015 refresh, the EcoBoost 1.0-litre three-cylinder began to be offered in North America as an extra-cost option for SE trim level. The 2016 model added 2.3-litre EcoBoost for the new RS trim level.

=== Specifications ===
Engine	Gearbox	Power	Torque	City (mpg)	Highway (mpg)	Combined (mpg)	Top speed (mph)	0–60 mph (0–97 km/h) (seconds)
1.0 L Turbocharged GDI I3 engine	6M	123 hp (92 kW) at 6350 rpm	148 lb⋅ft (201 N⋅m) at 5000 rpm	29	40	33	129 mph (208 km/h) (drag limited)	9.4
1.0 L Turbocharged GDI I3 engine	6A	123 hp (92 kW) at 6350 rpm	148 lb⋅ft (201 N⋅m) at 5000 rpm	28	40	33	120 mph (193 km/h) (drag limited)	10.2
2.0 L Ti-VCT GDI I4	5M	160 hp (119 kW) at 6500 rpm	146 lb⋅ft (198 N⋅m) at 4450 rpm	26	36	30	122 mph (196 km/h) (drag limited)	7.4
2.0 L Ti-VCT GDI I4	6A	160 hp (119 kW) at 6500 rpm	146 lb⋅ft (198 N⋅m) at 4450 rpm	27; SFE: 28	38; SFE: 40	31; SFE: 33	122 mph (196 km/h) (drag limited)	7.6
2.0 L Ti-VCT GDI I4 PZEV engine (PZEV states)	5M	159 hp (119 kW) at 6500 rpm	146 lb⋅ft (198 N⋅m) at 4450 rpm	26	36	30	NA	NA
2.0 L Ti-VCT GDI I4 PZEV engine (PZEV states)	6A	159 hp (119 kW) at 6500 rpm	146 lb⋅ft (198 N⋅m) at 4450 rpm	27	38	31	NA	NA
2.0 L Turbocharged GDI I4 engine (Focus ST)	6M	252 hp (188 kW) at 5500 rpm	270 lb⋅ft (366 N⋅m) at 2500 rpm	23	32	26	155 mph (249 km/h)	6.0
2.3 L Turbocharged GDI I4 engine (Focus RS)	6M	350 hp (261 kW) at 6000 rpm	350 lb⋅ft (475 N⋅m) at 3200 rpm	19	25	22	165 mph (266 km/h)	4.6

=== Running changes ===
Colour choices were restricted during summer 2011, due to supply issues caused by the 2011 Japanese earthquake/tsunami. When black and dark blue returned they were replaced by different shades, although the phaseout of Kona Blue in favor of Sonic Blue had been planned.

In 2012, the formerly automatic-only Titanium model was offered with a manual transmission. In March 2012, Ford revised the ordering guide for the Titanium models to also have a MyFord Touch delete option, replacing it with the non-touch version of MyFord. Although MyFord Touch is a $995 option on SEL models and the PowerShift automatic a $1095 option on S and SE, no discount is applied to either manual or non-Touch Titanium models.

2013 model year changes for non-STs are; SE models gain standard SYNC and alloy wheels, the SEL trim is discontinued in favor of an "SE Appearance package" that includes most of the SEL features but with standard trim choices limited to black leather, while Titanium models also pick up standard leather upholstery and lost the auto-dimming rearview mirror and rain-sensing windshield wipers. All now come standard with the 5-speed manual leaving the SFE pack as the last remaining automatic-only Focus (apart from the direct-drive electric), and colour choices are rearranged.

=== Reliability issues ===
Along with the Ford Fiesta, the Focus equipped with the Ford PowerShift transmission has received much criticism due to transmission shuddering, including several lemon law claims. The issue is due to the dry type clutches associated with petrol models. Ford's current response is to replace the clutch pack assembly (with updated parts) when shuddering exceeds 250 rpm (upon customer complaint).

Ford claims that the transmission, a dual-clutch automatic transmission, is designed to improve fuel economy and has issued several software upgrades for the transmission. To date, the National Highway Traffic Safety Administration has not required Ford to issue a recall, nor has Ford done so voluntarily. Focus models equipped with the conventional manual transmission have not been affected by the reliability issues.

A significant amount of the new models of the first year experiences problems with rust underneath the front bonnet, partly due to issues with the seam sealer used between the structural part of the bonnet and the skin, which allowed water to seep in and create corrosion (similarly to other Ford models of the period). Other issues included rust developing on the trunk lid of the hatchback model due to vibrations of a plastic insert creating friction and wearing out the paint on the metal skin of the lid. Later models included a relocated park brake lever, redesigned adjustable front head rest and a redesigned accessory 12v plug that is more ergonomic.

== European market ==
The UK range is available in hatchback and estate (wagon) in a large number of trim variants. Most other European countries, including the Republic of Ireland, also include the four-door saloon, unlike Britain, as previous generation sales did not sell as well in comparison with the hatchback and estate.

=== Engine lineup in Europe ===
- 1.0 litre EcoBoost: this three-cylinder turbocharged engine is produced in two variants, producing 100 and 125 hp (75 and 93 kW). It replaced the 1.6-litre Ti-VCT Duratec in 2012.
- 1.6-litre Duratec Ti-VCT: this engine is an updated version of the same engine from the previous model, with improved intake and exhaust manifolds. The improvements also mean that the engine has been updated to Euro 5 and Euro 6 emissions standards. The 1.6-litre Ti-VCT is available in three versions, 85 hp (63 kW), 105 hp (78 kW) and 125 hp (93 kW). Torque figures are 141 N⋅m (104 lb⋅ft), 150 N⋅m (110 lb⋅ft), and 159 N⋅m (117 lb⋅ft), respectively.
- 1.6-litre EcoBoost: this engine came with the Durashift B6 manual transmission. It was available with 150 or 182 hp (112 or 136 kW), both versions produced 240 N⋅m (180 lb⋅ft) of torque along with 270 N⋅m (200 lb⋅ft) with the overboost function. The 150 hp (110 kW) engine is rated for 0 to 60 mph (0 to 97 km/h) in 7.6 seconds while the 182 hp (136 kW) completed it in 7.1 seconds. The 1.6-litre engine was replaced by the 1.5-litre engine in 2015.
- 1.6-litre Duratorq: just like the petrol Duratec, the diesel is upgraded for emissions and economy. This engine has eight valves instead of 16 on the previous model. The basic version produces 95 hp (71 kW) and 230 N⋅m (170 lb⋅ft), while the top-of-the-range version generates 115 hp (86 kW) and 270 N⋅m (200 lb⋅ft) with 285 N⋅m (210 lb⋅ft) in the overboost function. For the Focus Econetic model, the engine produces 105 hp (78 kW).
- 2.0-litre Duratorq: top of the range diesel engine is highly updated and available with PowerShift, it comes in two versions, 150 and 185 hp (112 and 138 kW), which produce 370 and 400 N⋅m (270 and 300 lb⋅ft) of torque, respectively.

=== Safety and recall ===
In 2017, Ford recalled Ford Focus with 1.6 EcoBoost engines because of a risk of engine fires caused by a “lack of coolant circulation”. There were 29 fires related to the engine in the U.S. and Canada reported to Ford. The recall partly contributed to a charge of US$300 million by Ford.

== Australia ==
Announced in 2010, the Australian Focus was set for arrival in August 2011. Going on sale would be a hatch and a sedan, in 4 trim levels and 3 powertrains. The Focus range starts with the base Ambiente, Trend, mid-range Sport, and top-of-the-line Titanium. Powering the Ford Focus are 2 petrol, a 1.6 petrol with 92 kW and 159 Nm, a 2.0 petrol with 118 kW and 198 Nm, and one diesel, a 2.0 turbo-diesel with 120 kW and 340 Nm. Ambiente coming with the 1.6, and the Trend, Sport and Titanium standard with the 2.0 petrol, with the 2.0 diesel available as an option. Power was sent through a 5-speed manual on all models except the Titanium, and a 6-speed dual-clutch PowerShift automatic transmission is standard on the Titanium and optional on all others (standard with diesel).

== Other markets ==
=== Asia ===
In March 2012, the Focus was launched to the ASEAN markets at the Bangkok International Motor Show. The Thailand range included: 1.6 Ambiente, 1.6 Trend, 2.0 Sport 5-door, 2.0 Titanium sedan, 2.0 Sport+ 5-door and 2.0 Titanium+ sedan trim levels, while in Malaysia, it is offered in both sedan and hatchback body-styles. Two trim levels are available for both body-style, the sedan got Titanium and Titanium+ trim while the hatchback got Sport and Sport+ trim.

In Taiwan, Assembly started by the end of 2012. 2 petrol engines (1.6L Ti-VCT 125 PS and 2.0L GDI 170 PS) and 1 diesel engine (2.0L TDCi 163 PS) available, all come with PowerShift transmission as the manual transmission model was unavailable. 8 trim levels:

In the Korean market, 2.0L TDCi Duratorq Diesel is the only available engine (available in 140 hp and 163 hp configuration), and all come with the PowerShift transmission as the manual transmission model was unavailable. Three trim Levels: Trend (140 hp), Sport (163 hp), Titanium (163 hp), all available in both hatchback and sedan body style.

In Japan, the 2.0L Ti-VCT GDI Sport five door hatchback with either the five speed dual clutch manual transmission, or the six speed "Power Shift" automatic transmission was the only model currently offered. The assembly changed from the Saarlouis Body & Assembly to the AutoAlliance Thailand facility. Its width dimensions at 1,810 mm (71.3 in) are not within the favorable Japanese compact car tax classification.

== Specifications ==
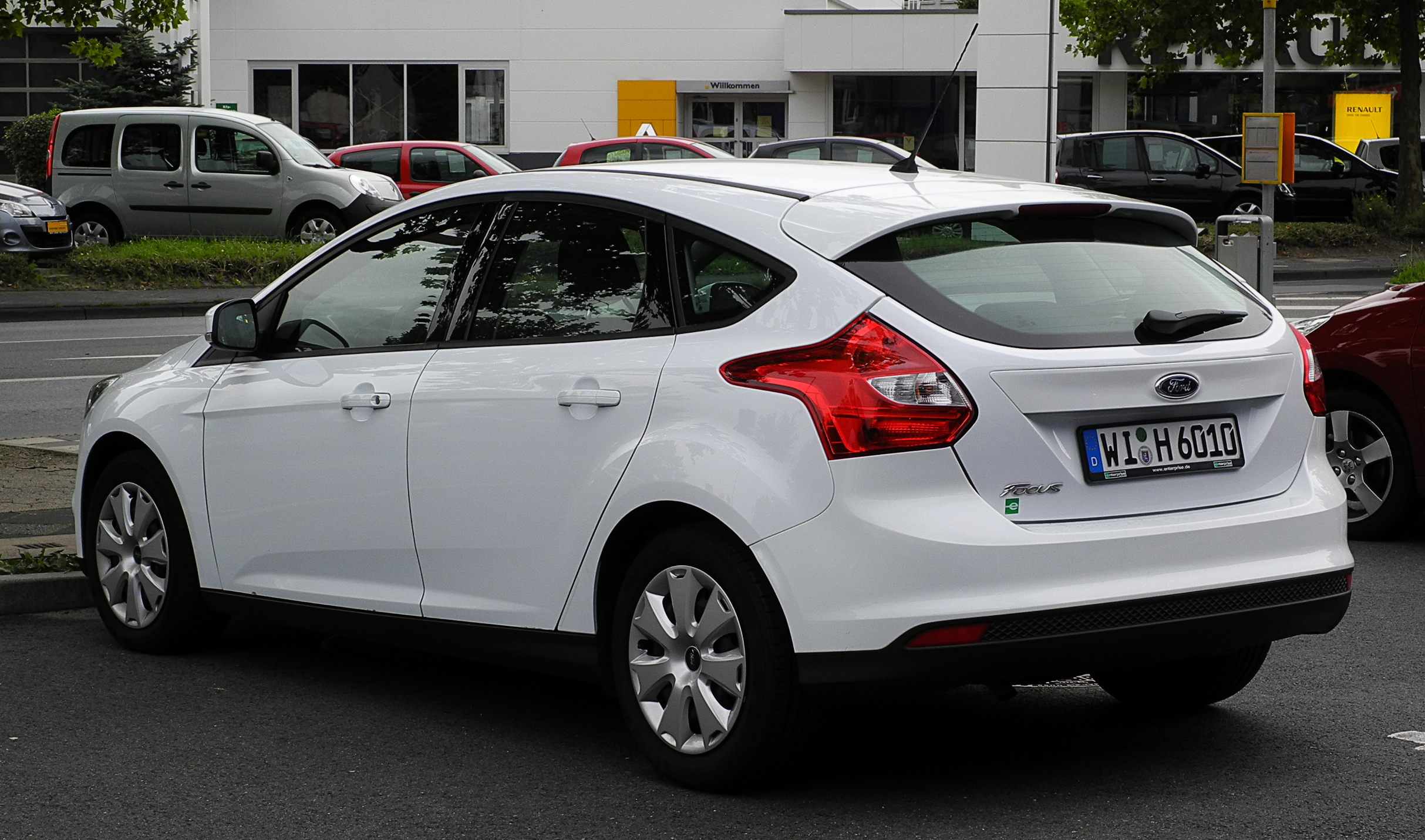
Hatchback (pre-facelift)

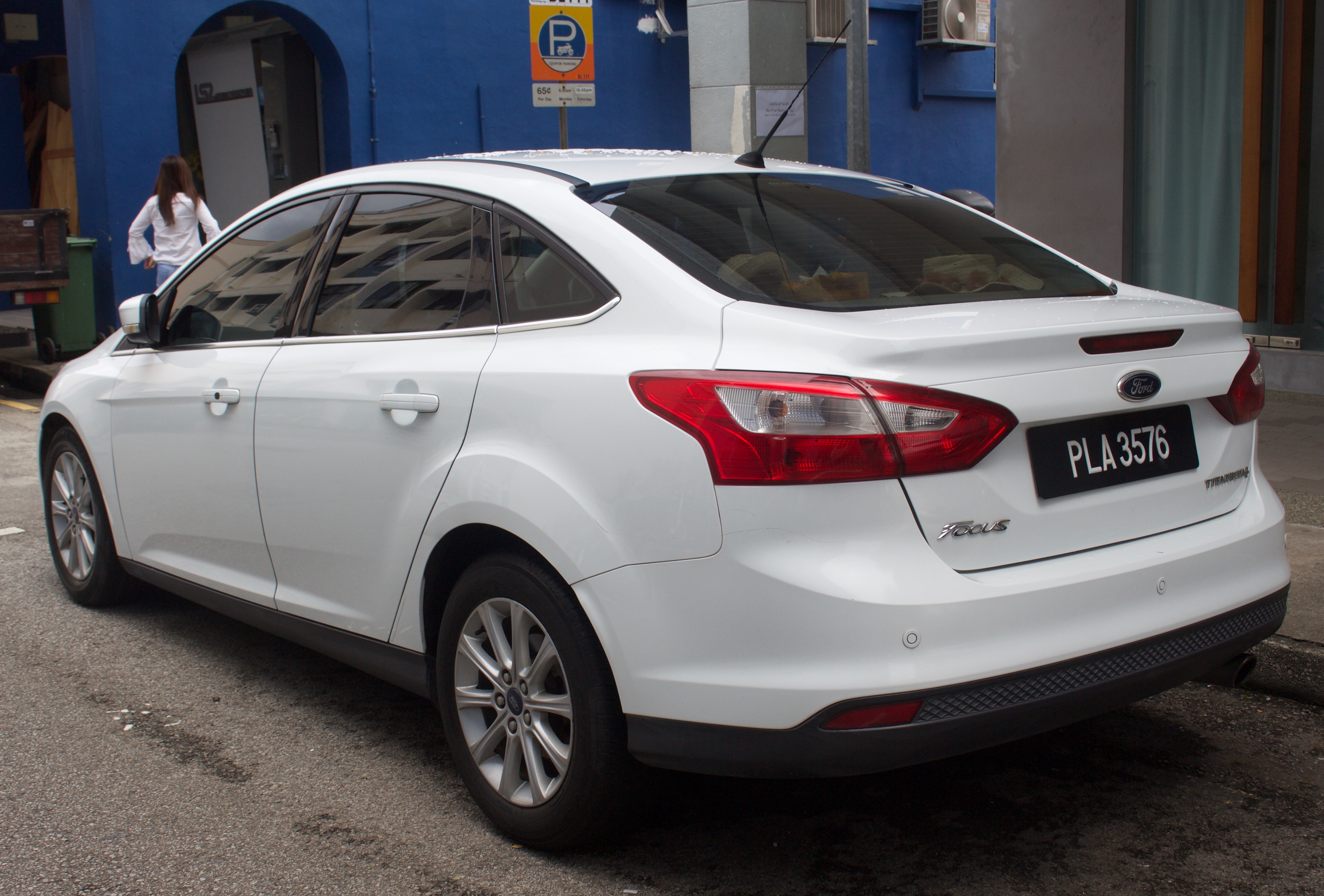
Sedan (pre-facelift)

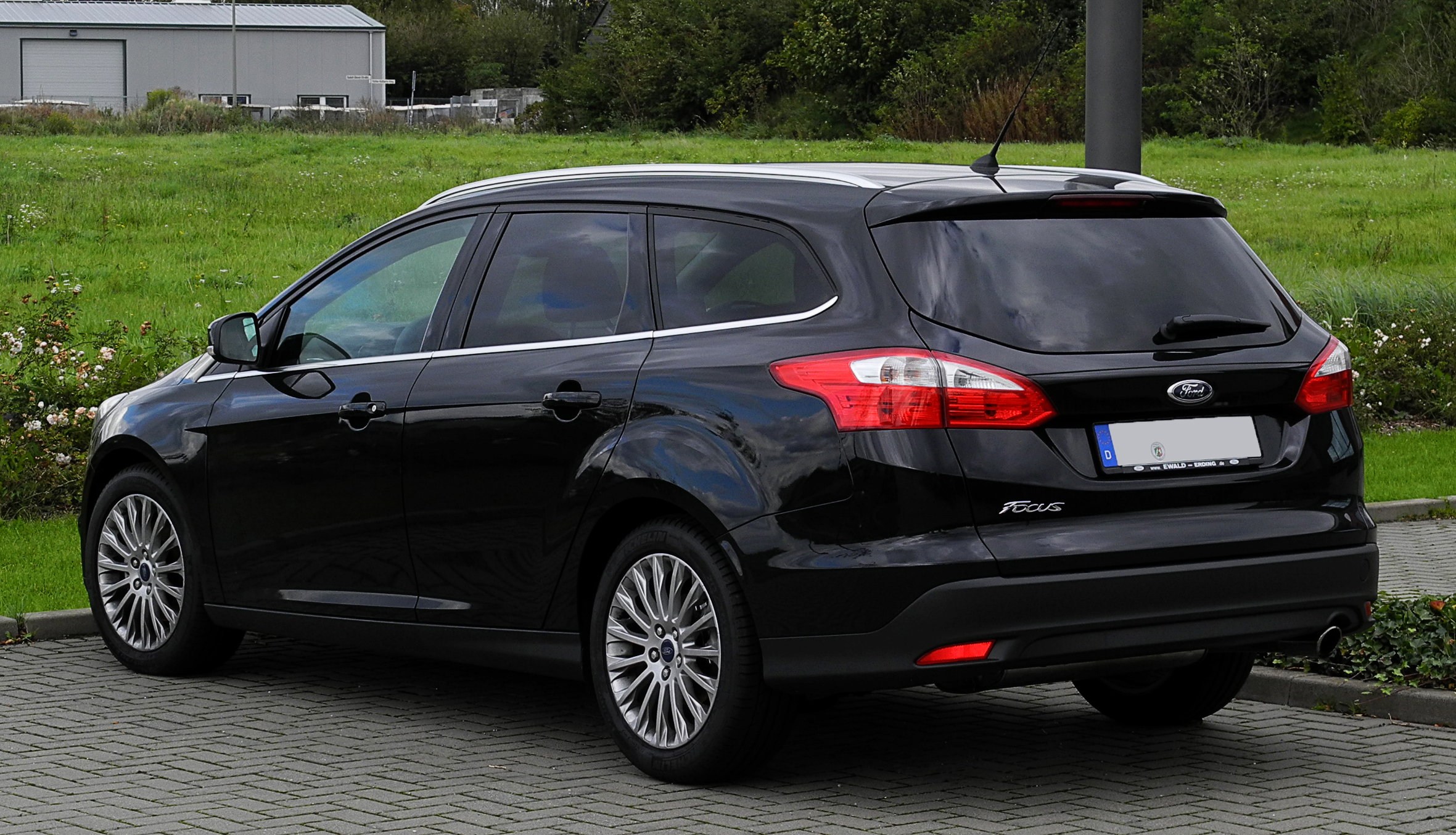
Wagon (pre-facelift)

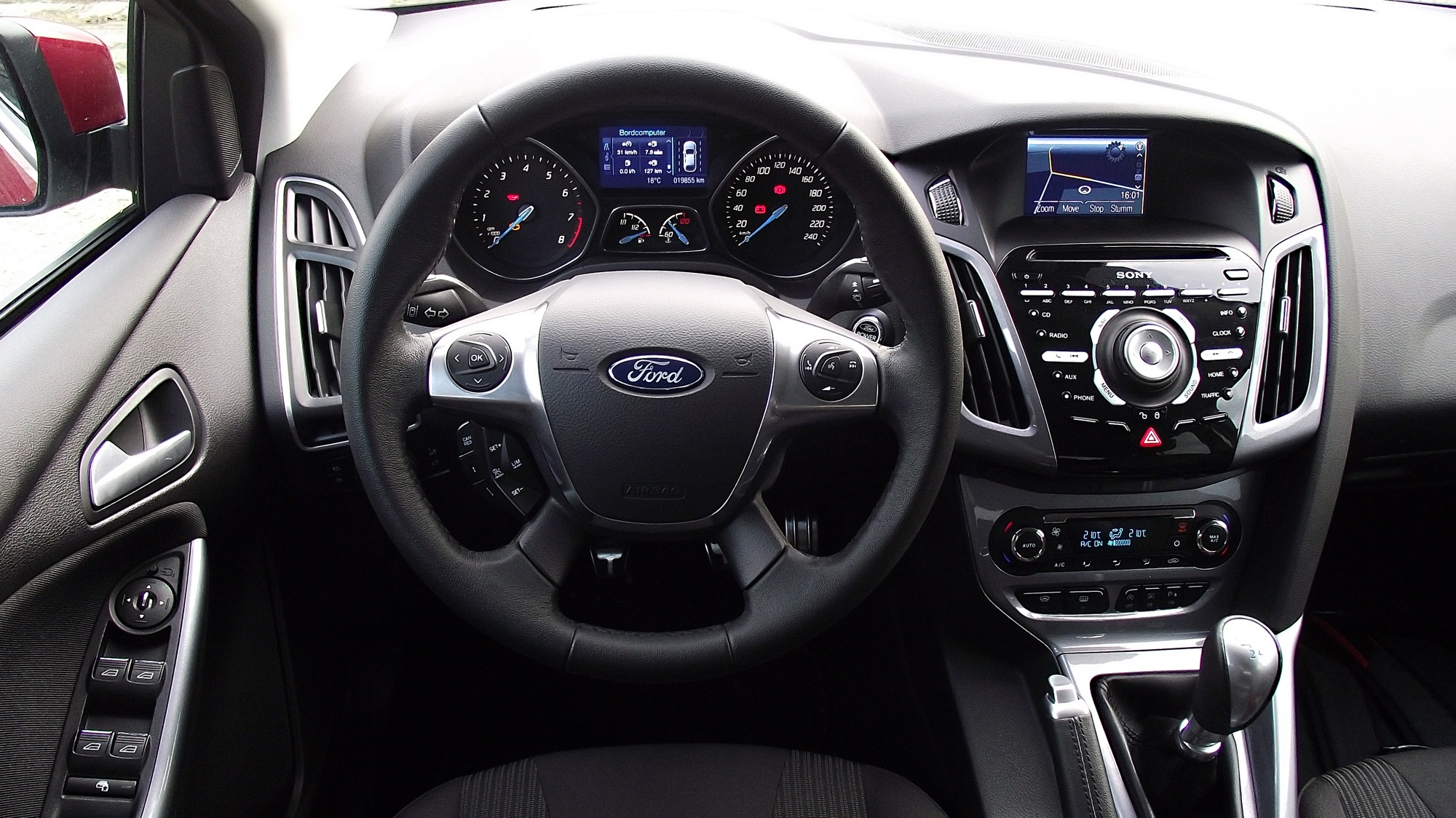
Interior (pre-facelift)

5-door hatchback model, availability varies between markets.

Engine	Transmission	Power Torque	Urban l/100 km	Extra-urban l/100 km	Combined l/100 km	Top speed	0–100 km/h (0–62 mph) (seconds)	CO_{2} Emissions
Petrol engines
1.0 L EcoBoost (2012–2019)	5M	100 PS (74 kW; 99 bhp); 170 N⋅m (125 lbf⋅ft)	5.9	4.1	4.8	187 km/h (116 mph)	12.5	109g/km
1.0 L EcoBoost (2012–2019)	6M	125 PS (92 kW; 123 bhp); 170 N⋅m (125 lbf⋅ft)	6.3	4.2	5.0	195 km/h (121 mph)	11.3	114g/km
1.6 L Ti-VCT Duratec	5M	85 PS (63 kW; 84 bhp); 141 N⋅m (104 lb⋅ft)	8.0	4.7	5.9	170 km/h (106 mph)	14.9	
1.6 L Ti-VCT Duratec	5M	105 PS (77 kW; 104 bhp); 150 N⋅m (111 lbf⋅ft)	8.0	4.7	5.9	187 km/h (116 mph)	12.3	136g/km
1.6 L Ti-VCT Duratec	5M	125 PS (92 kW; 123 bhp); 159 N⋅m (117 lb⋅ft)	8.0	4.7	5.9	195 km/h (121 mph)	10.9	149g/km
1.6 L Ti-VCT Duratec	6A	125 PS (92 kW; 123 bhp); 159 N⋅m (117 lb⋅ft)	9.3	4.8	6.4	193 km/h (120 mph)	11.7	
1.6 L EcoBoost	6M	150 PS (110 kW; 148 bhp); 240 N⋅m (177 lbf⋅ft)	7.6	4.9	5.9	210 km/h (130 mph)	8.6	137g/km
1.6 L EcoBoost	6M / 6A	182 PS (134 kW; 180 bhp); 240 N⋅m (177 lbf⋅ft)	7.6	4.9	5.9	222 km/h (138 mph)	7.9	137g/km
2.0 L EcoBoost	6M	250 PS (184 kW; 247 bhp); 360 N⋅m (266 lbf⋅ft)	9.9	5.6	7.2	248 km/h (154 mph)	6.5	169g/km
Diesel engines
1.6 L Duratorq	6M	95 PS (70 kW; 94 bhp); 230 N⋅m (170 lbf⋅ft)	5.1	3.7	4.2	180 km/h (112 mph)	12.5	109g/km
1.6 L Duratorq	6M	115 PS (85 kW; 113 bhp); 270 N⋅m (199 lbf⋅ft)	5.1	3.7	4.2	193 km/h (120 mph)	10.9	109g/km
1.6 L Duratorq Econetic	6M	105 PS (77 kW; 104 bhp); 270 N⋅m (199 lbf⋅ft)	3.9	3.1	3.4	187 km/h (116 mph)	11.8	88g/km
2.0 L Duratorq	6A	115 PS (85 kW; 113 bhp); 300 N⋅m (221 lbf⋅ft)	6.6	4.3	5.2	196 km/h (122 mph)	10.9	
2.0 L Duratorq	6M	140 PS (103 kW; 138 bhp); 320 N⋅m (236 lbf⋅ft)	6.1	4.1	4.9	207 km/h (129 mph)	8.9	124g/km
2.0 L Duratorq	6A	140 PS (103 kW; 138 bhp); 320 N⋅m (236 lbf⋅ft)	6.6	4.3	5.2	205 km/h (127 mph)	9.5	134g/km
2.0 L Duratorq	6M	163 PS (120 kW; 161 bhp); 340 N⋅m (251 lbf⋅ft)	6.1	4.1	4.9	218 km/h (135 mph)	8.6	124g/km
2.0 L Duratorq	6A	163 PS (120 kW; 161 bhp); 340 N⋅m (251 lbf⋅ft)	6.6	4.3	5.2	215 km/h (134 mph)	8.9	134g/km

=== Safety ===
The Focus in its most basic Latin American market configuration received 5 stars for adult occupants and 4 stars for toddlers from Latin NCAP 1.0 in 2013.

Latin NCAP 1.5 test results Ford Focus III + 2 Airbags (2013, similar to Euro NCAP 2002)
Test	Points	Stars
Adult occupant:	16.52/17.0	5 /5 stars
Child occupant:	38.06/49.00	4 /5 stars

ANCAP test results* Ford Focus all variants (2011)
Test	Score
Overall	5 /5 stars
Frontal offset	15.04/16
Side impact	15.13/16
Pole	2/2
Seat belt reminders	2/3
Whiplash protection	Good
Pedestrian protection	Adequate
Electronic stability control	Standard

ANCAP test results* Ford Focus all variants except the Focus RS (2014)
Test	Score
Overall	5 /5 stars
Frontal offset	15.04/16
Side impact	15.13/16
Pole	2/2
Seat belt reminders	2/3
Whiplash protection	Good
Pedestrian protection	Adequate
Electronic stability control	Standard

Euro NCAP test results* Ford Focus (2012)
Test	Points	%
Overall:	5 /5 stars	
Adult occupant:	33	92%
Child occupant:	40	82%
Pedestrian:	26	72%
Safety assist:	5	71%

== Facelift (2014–2019) ==
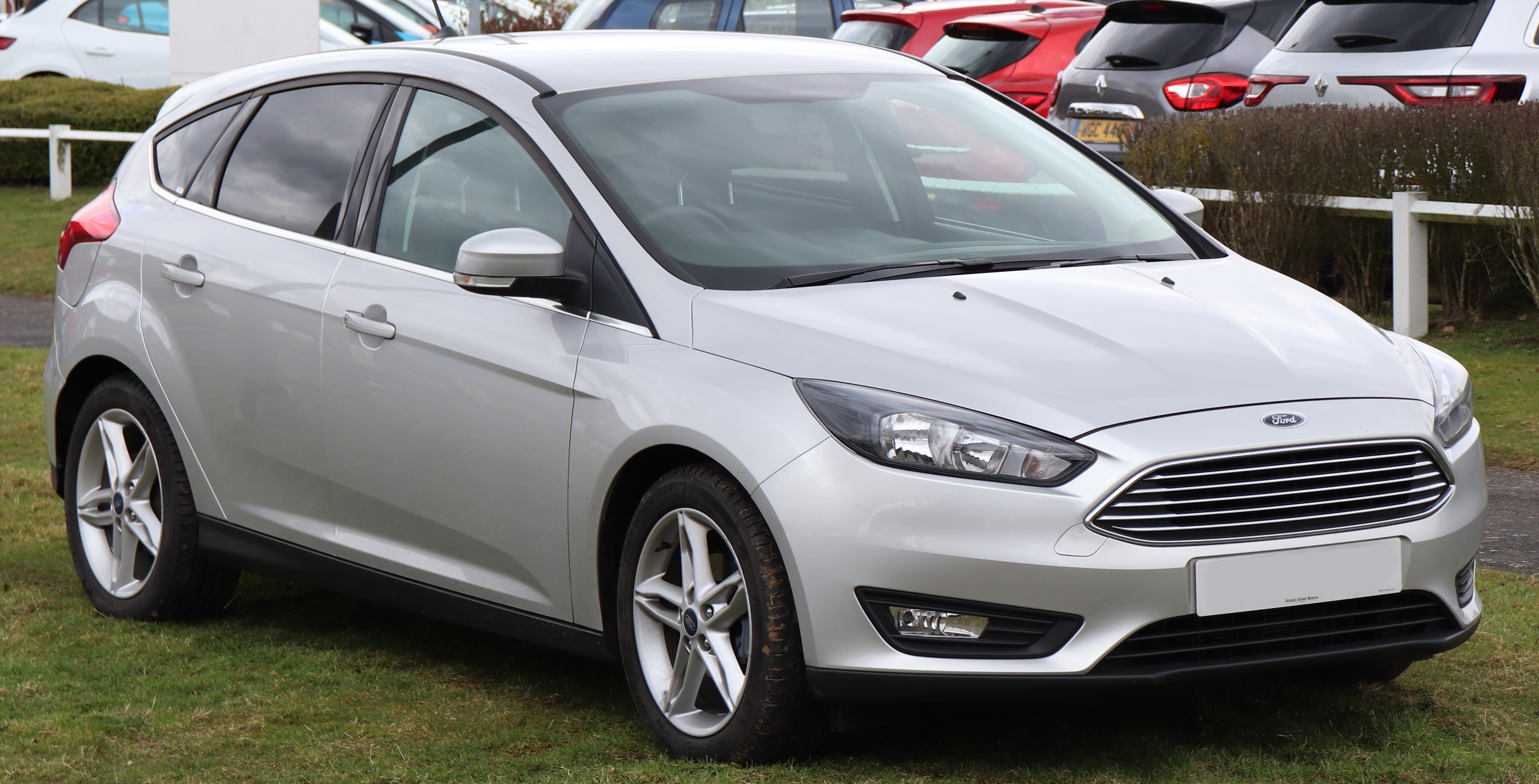
Ford Focus front facelift

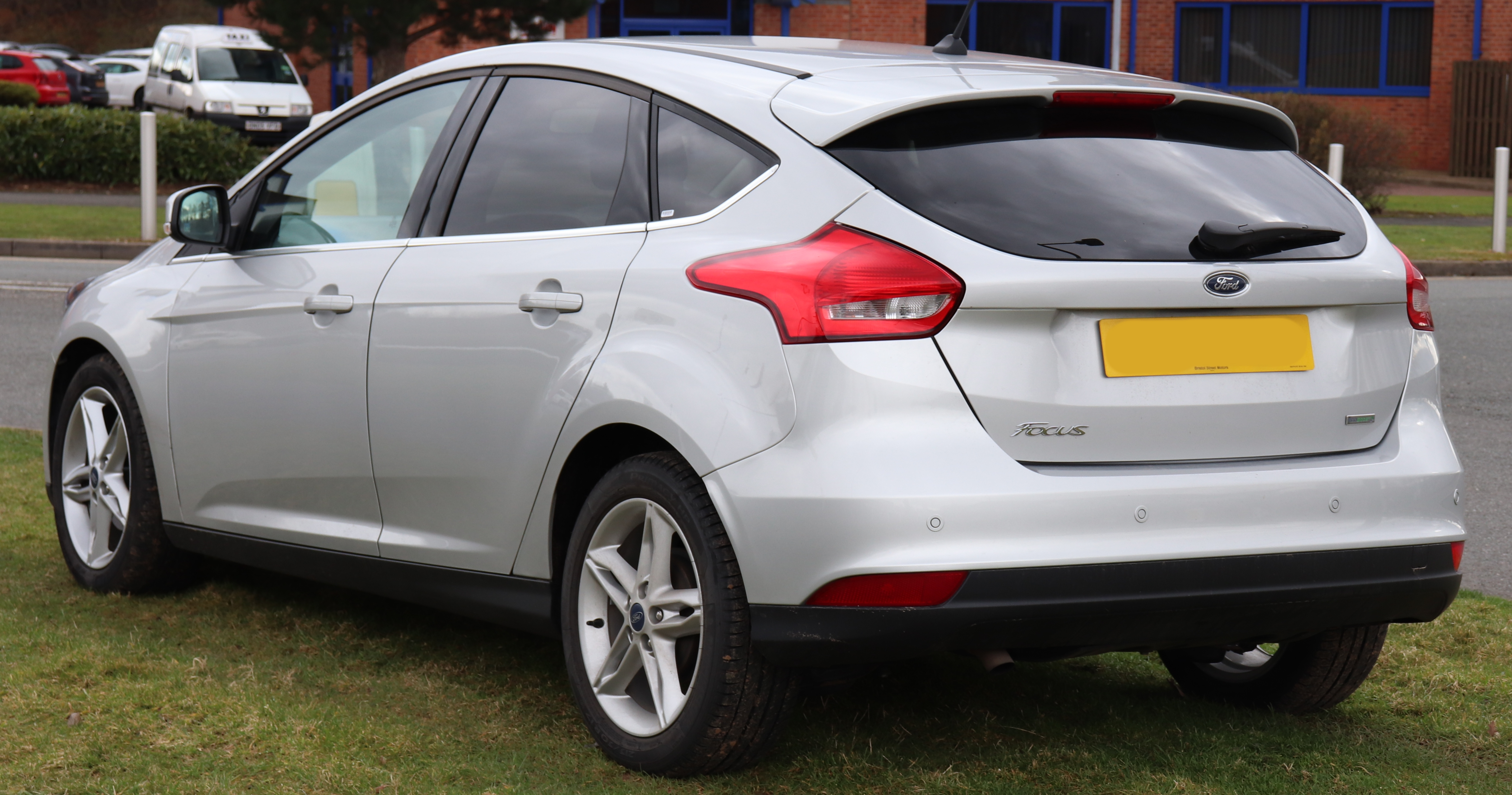
Facelift Ford Focus hatchback

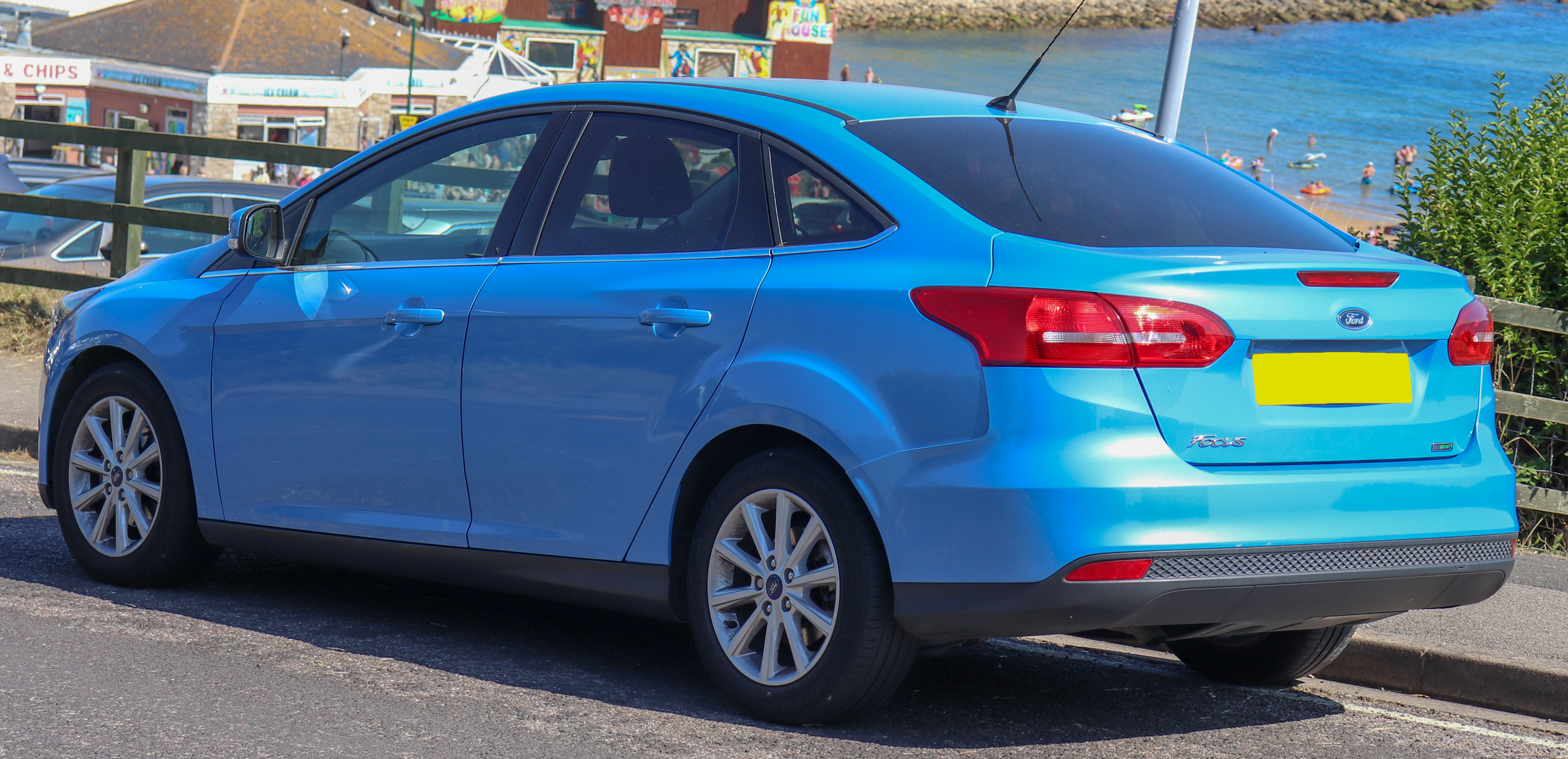
Facelift Ford Focus sedan

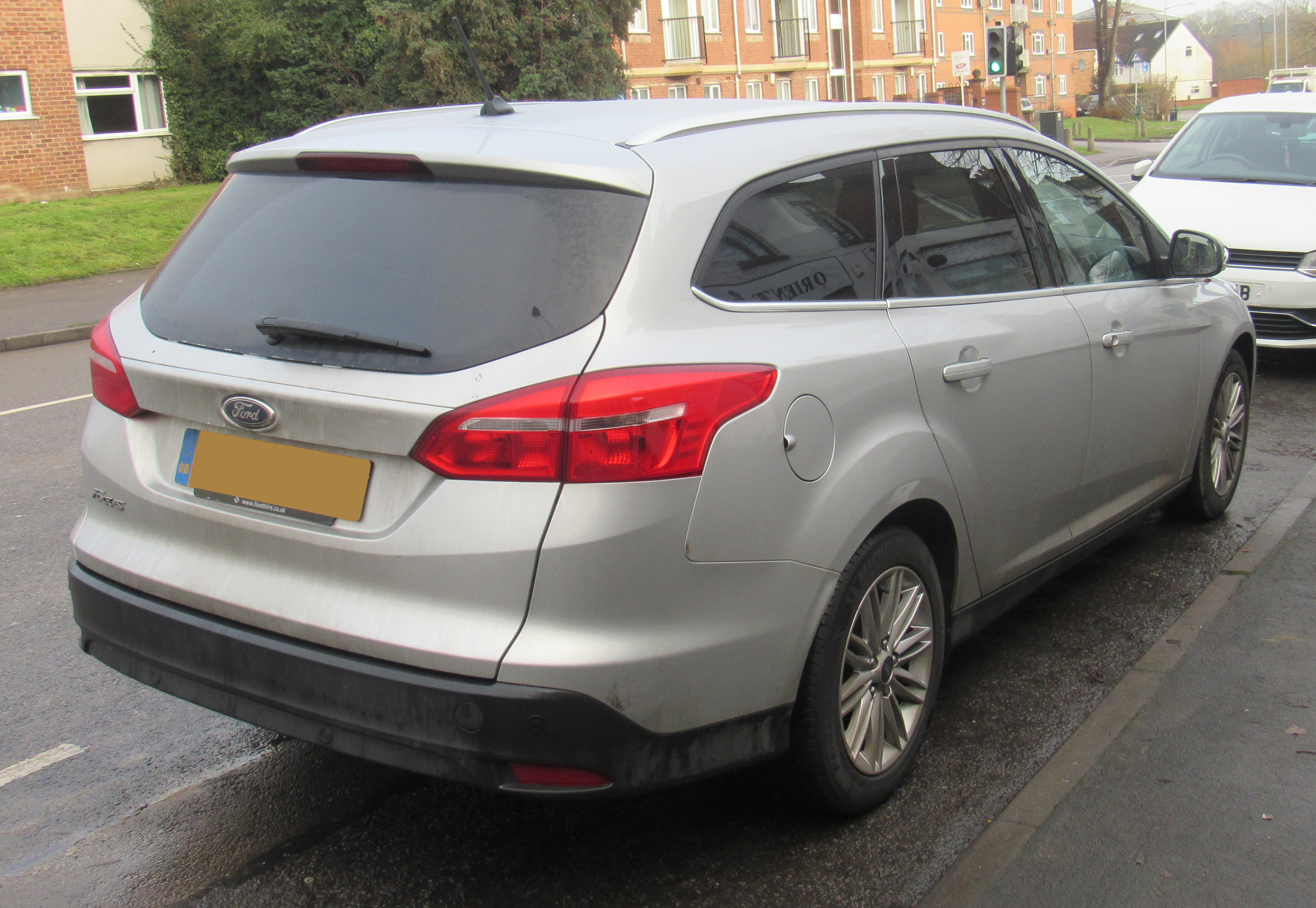
Facelift Ford Focus wagon

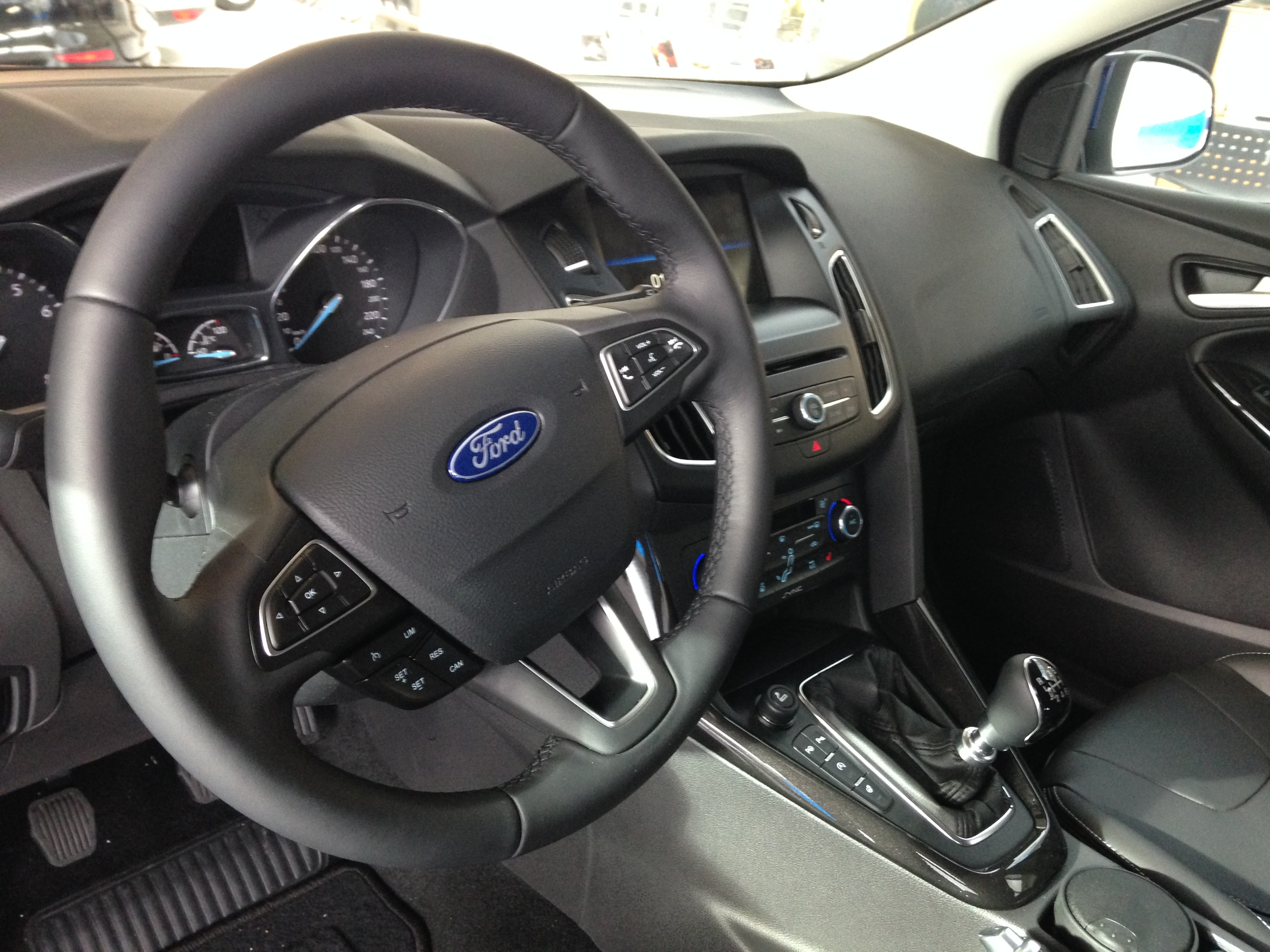
Interior (facelift)

The Ford Focus mid-cycle facelift (Mk 3.5) was shown at the 2014 Geneva Motor Show, and features a raft of changes made to the exterior, interior, and engine line up.

Revisions made to the body were thinner and sharper headlights, a new trapezoidal grille, giving the front more sporting intent than the previous model. The new front end is similar to that of the 2014 Mondeo as well as the facelifted 2012 Fiesta, while also inspired by the 2011 Ford Evos concept as well as various Aston Martin vehicles (Ford owns an 8% interest in Aston Martin). The 2015 facelifted Ford C-Max and Grand C-Max, and the 2015 S-Max and Galaxy, have also incorporated the new family face. On Titanium and Titanium X trim levels, the grille is chrome, while other trim levels receive a black mesh grille instead. The ST features a unique Black honeycomb grille. The front fog-lights were also changed. At the rear on the hatchback, the rear lights were changed, so that they appear sharper, and less clumsy. The estate and saloon, (saloon is not available in Britain), also had subtle revisions to their rears.

For the 2015 model year the Focus range was offered with a 1.5-litre turbocharged four-cylinder "EcoBoost" powerplant available in 110 and 132 kW (148 and 177 hp) outputs in place of the current older 1.6-litre and 2.0-litre offerings. Another new feature is the 2016 Ford Focus RS's "Drift Mode", which allows the driver to more easily and safely drift the car.

Inside, the multitude of buttons on the dashboard was removed and replaced by an all-new eight-inch touchscreen. The quality of plastics improved, and the steering wheel was changed to a three-spoke. Trim levels in the UK consist of Studio, Style (instead of Edge due to the Ford Mondeo based SUV), Zetec, Zetec S (including special Red and Black editions) - later replaced in 2016 by Zetec Edition, ST-Line (and later ST-Line X), Titanium, Titanium X and ST. Trim levels in Europe are similar to the pre-facelift model including Ambiente, Trend, Trend +, Titanium, and ST. The new 1.5 TDCi Duratorq diesel (95 and 120 hp) and 1.5 EcoBoost (150 and 180 hp) has been added to the line-up. The 2.0 TDCi Duratorq diesel has been updated to produce 150 and 185 hp.

The new third-generation RS model went on sale in 2016, with pricing from around £31,000 and the new 2.3 EcoBoost from the Ford Mustang, but updated to produce 350 hp. It was revealed in the production variant at the 2015 Geneva Motor Show and featured at the 2015 Goodwood Festival of Speed.

Mechanical improvements to the facelifted Ford Focus are chassis revisions to all versions, to make the car more planted on the road, and the steering is also sharper than the pre-facelift model, while also offering greater feedback for greater driving pleasure and fun, which has been the trademark of the Focus since it launched back in 1998.

=== Engine lineup in Europe ===
==== 1.0-litre EcoBoost ====
Award-winning three-cylinder engine is produced in three variants, with 100 and 125 hp (75–93 kW) and 138 bhp (103 kW; 140 PS).

==== 1.6-litre Duratec Ti-VCT ====
This engine - an updated version of the same engine from the previous model, allowing it to breathe better with improved intake and exhaust manifolds. The improvements also mean that the engine has been updated to EU5 norms (from 2015 - EU6 norms). From 2014, the 1.6 Ti-VCT was available in three versions: 85 hp (63 kW), 105 and 125 hp (78–93 kW), but in some European markets also as 86 kW (117 PS; 115 hp) with factory LPG (i.e.: German market - as 1.6 LPG Bivalenten Autogasmotor/ English: BiFuel LPG Engine). It was discontinued in 2018.

==== 1.5-litre EcoBoost ====
This all-new engine replaces the 1.6-litre EcoBoost with the same power, but with an improved economy. The engine comes equipped with either Ford-Getrag's Durashift B6 manual gearbox or with a new Torque Converter automatic (6F35) available on the Focus for the first time. In the Focus it is available with 177 hp (132 kW) and 240 N⋅m (177 lb⋅ft) of torque, the only engine on offer in the Australian Trend, Sport and Titanium models.

==== 2.0-litre EcoBoost ====
Exclusive to the ST range, this engine continues to produce 252 hp (188 kW), and is available only with the 6-speed manual, producing 360 newton-metres (270 lbf⋅ft) of torque. However, after the facelift it no longer contains oil sump baffles designed to prevent oil starvation issues during hard cornering.

==== 2.3-litre EcoBoost ====
This all-new engine is already used in the new-generation Ford Mustang and used by the third-generation Focus RS since 2016 with an output of 350 hp (261 kW).

==== 1.6-litre DuraTORQ TDCi ====
Just like the petrol Duratec, this diesel engine was upgraded for emissions and economy for the third-generation Focus. It produced 95 hp (71 kW) and 230 newton-metres (170 lbf⋅ft) in the basic version and 115 hp (86 kW) and 270 newton-metres (200 lbf⋅ft) of torque in the more potent version. For the Focus Econetic model, the engine produced 105 hp (78 kW). The engine as of 2016 has been replaced by the 1.5-litre TDCi engine.

==== 1.5-litre DuraTORQ TDCi ====
An all-new engine as of 2014, replaces the older 1.6-litre Duratorq diesel (despite running side-by-side for a few years) from 2016, and comes in three variants: 95 hp (71 kW) with 250 newton-metres (180 lbf⋅ft) of torque, and 120 hp (89 kW) with 270 newton-metres (200 lbf⋅ft) of torque. An Econetic option is also available, with 105 hp (78 kW), but tuned for economy rather than performance.

==== 2.0-litre DuraTORQ TDCi ====
The top of the range diesel engine is highly revised and updated and available with Ford PowerShift transmission, and the 6-speed manual. It now comes in two new versions, 163 PS (120 kW; 161 hp) with 370 N⋅m (273 lb⋅ft) of torque and 185 PS (136 kW; 182 hp) with 400 N⋅m (295 lb⋅ft) of torque, the latter also available in the ST.

== ECOnetic ==
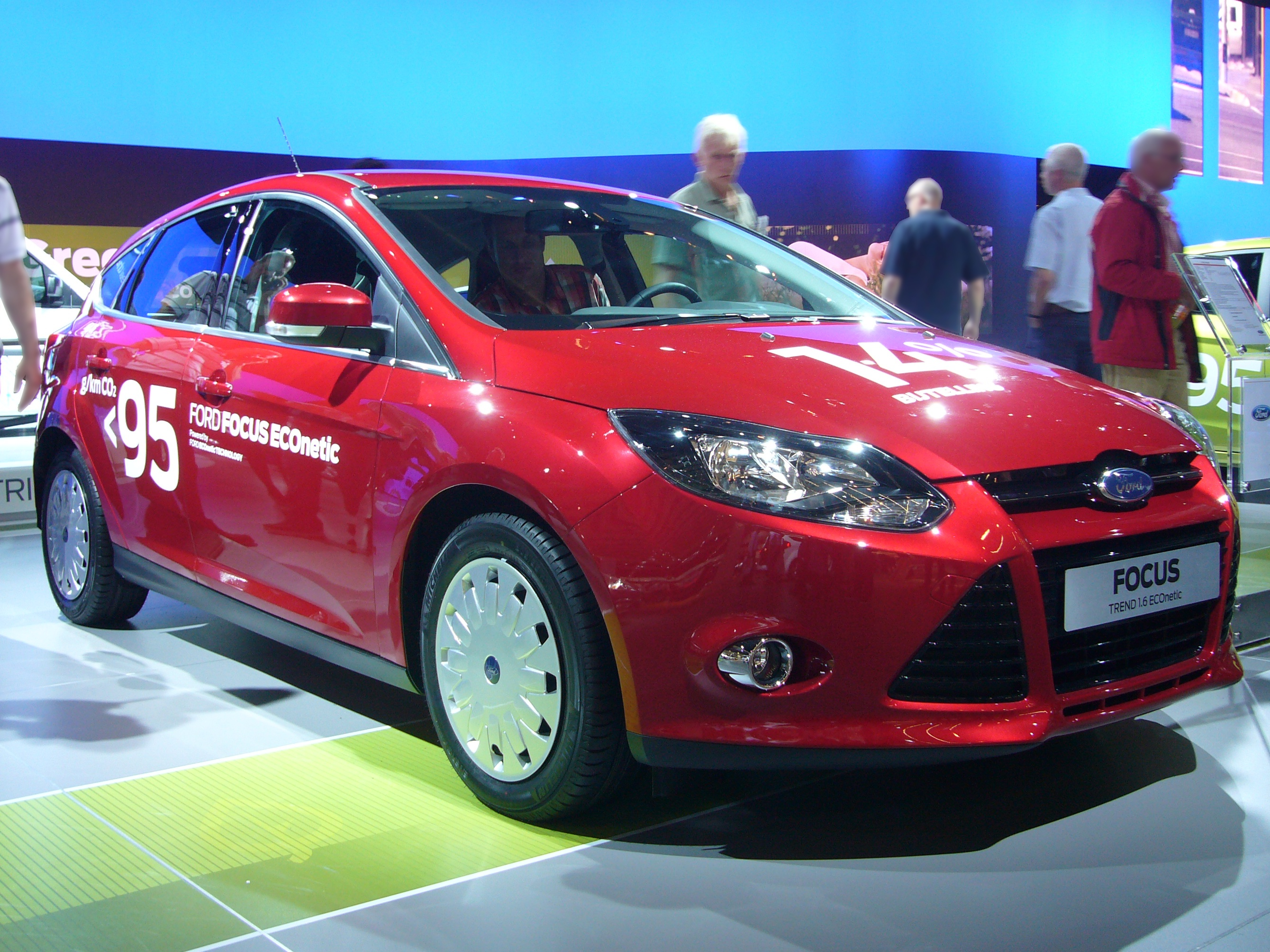
Front of prototype Series3 Ford Focus ECOnetic, showing closed lower grille and aerodynamic hubcaps on thinner, low-resistance Michelin tyres

The second generation Focus ECOnetic for 2011 includes new technologies as Auto-Start-Stop system, Smart Regenerative Charging, Eco mode, Active Grille Shutter, ultra-low rolling resistance tyres, Shift Indicator Light and revised final drive ratio targeting 95g/km average CO_{2} emissions and 80mpg. Third generation Focus ECOnetic will have improved Ford's Duratorq 1.6-litre 105 hp engine with standard coated Diesel particulate filter (cDPF). Many of these features found their way onto the North American SFE (Super Fuel Economy) model.

== Focus Electric ==
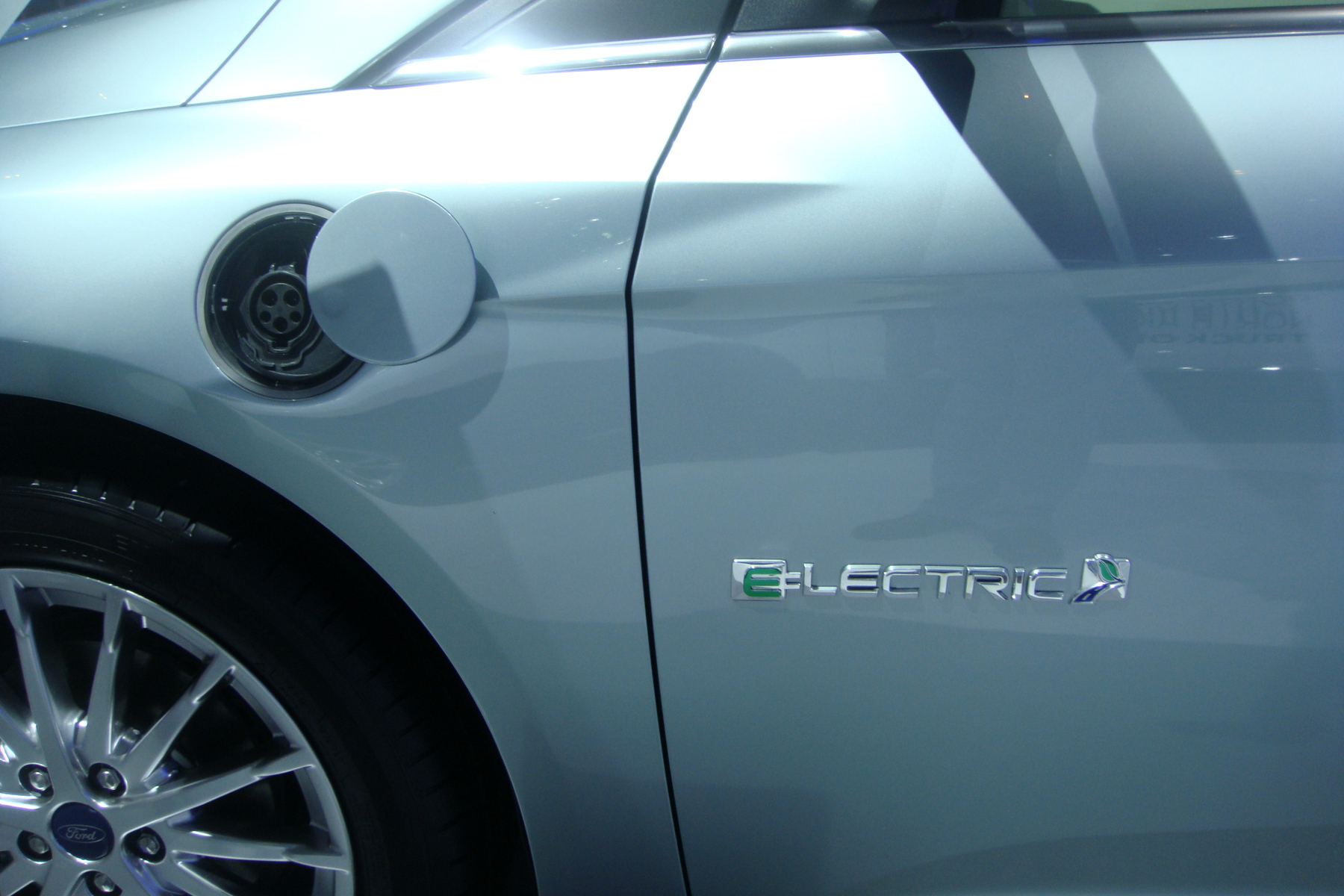
The charging port in the production version is located on the left front fender

In January 2011 Ford launched its pre-production version based on the Focus Mark III under the new name of Ford Focus Electric at the Consumer Electronics Show, rather than the traditional North American Auto Show. with sales scheduled in the U.S. market by late 2011 and in Europe by 2013. The concept electric car was unveiled at the 2009 Frankfurt Motor Show as the Ford Focus BEV. The Focus BEV was based on the European second generation Focus.

For the Focus Electric, Ford used a complete electric drive train developed and supplied by Magna Steyr, and uses a 23 kWh, liquid-cooled lithium-ion battery pack, has a range of 76 mi (122 km) on a charge, and a top speed of 84 mph (135 km/h).

The Focus Electric was built at the Michigan Assembly Plant in Wayne, Michigan on the same line as the petrol-powered version of the Focus, the C-Max Energi plug-in hybrid and the C-Max Hybrid. Initial production will be limited, with production to be ramped up in 2012.

Sales of the Ford Focus Electric were slated for late 2011, and it was available initially only in 19 metropolitan areas including Atlanta, Houston and Austin, Texas, Boston, Chicago, Denver, Detroit, Los Angeles, San Francisco, San Diego, New York City, Orlando, Florida, Phoenix and Tucson, Arizona, Portland, Oregon, Raleigh-Durham, Richmond, Virginia, Seattle, and Washington, D.C.

The Ford Focus Electric was awarded the 2011 Green Car Vision Award at the 2011 Washington Auto Show.

For 2017 and 2018 the Ford Focus Electric came standard in North America and Europe with DC fast charging utilizing a CCS instead of a standard J plug. As well as a larger 33.5KWh battery

Ford ended European series production of the full-electric version of its Focus by April 2017. North American Ford Focus production ended in May 2018 effectively ending full-electric production with it.

As of 2021, Ford has confirmed plans for an all new Focus EV as it moves toward full electrification.

== Focus ST ==
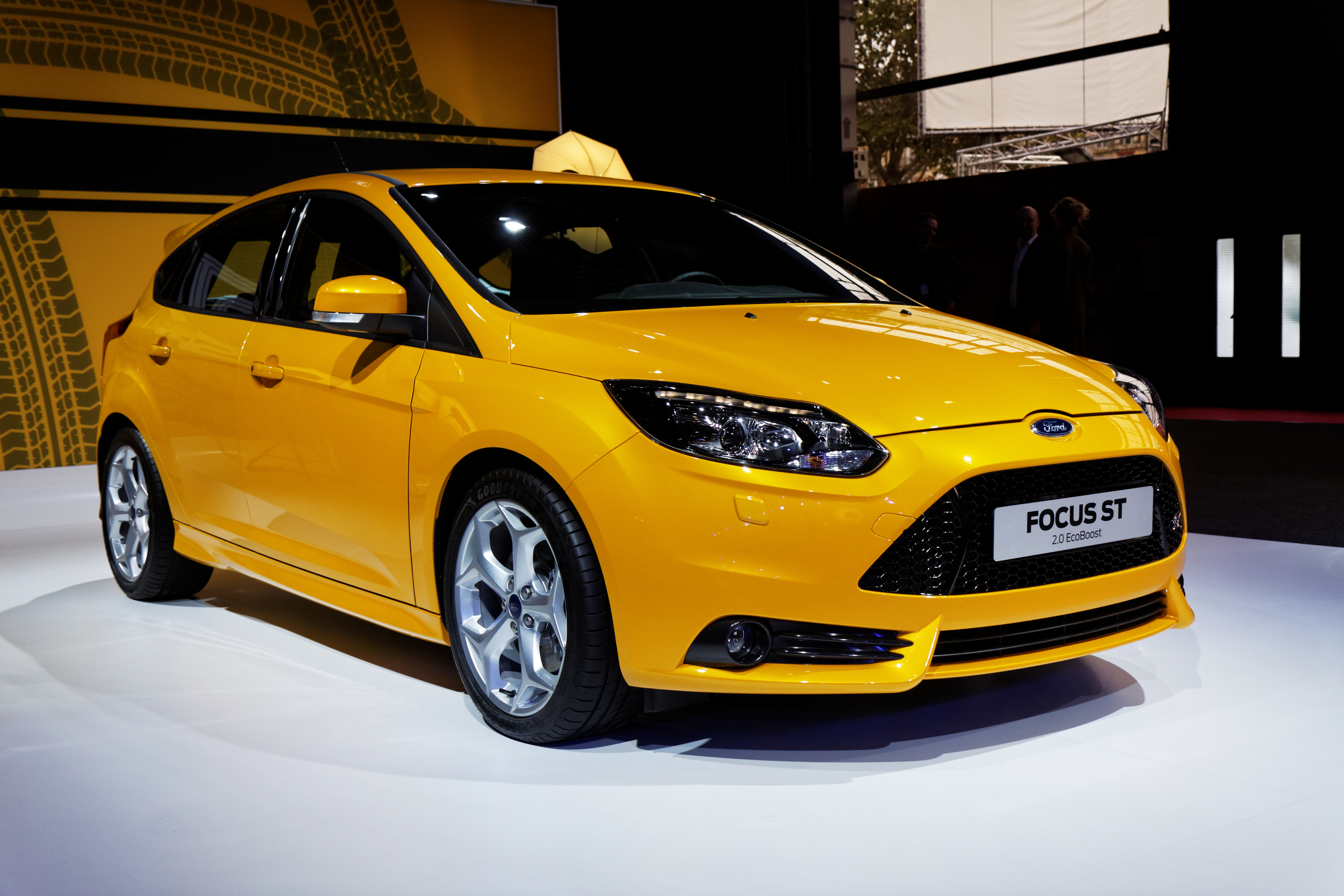

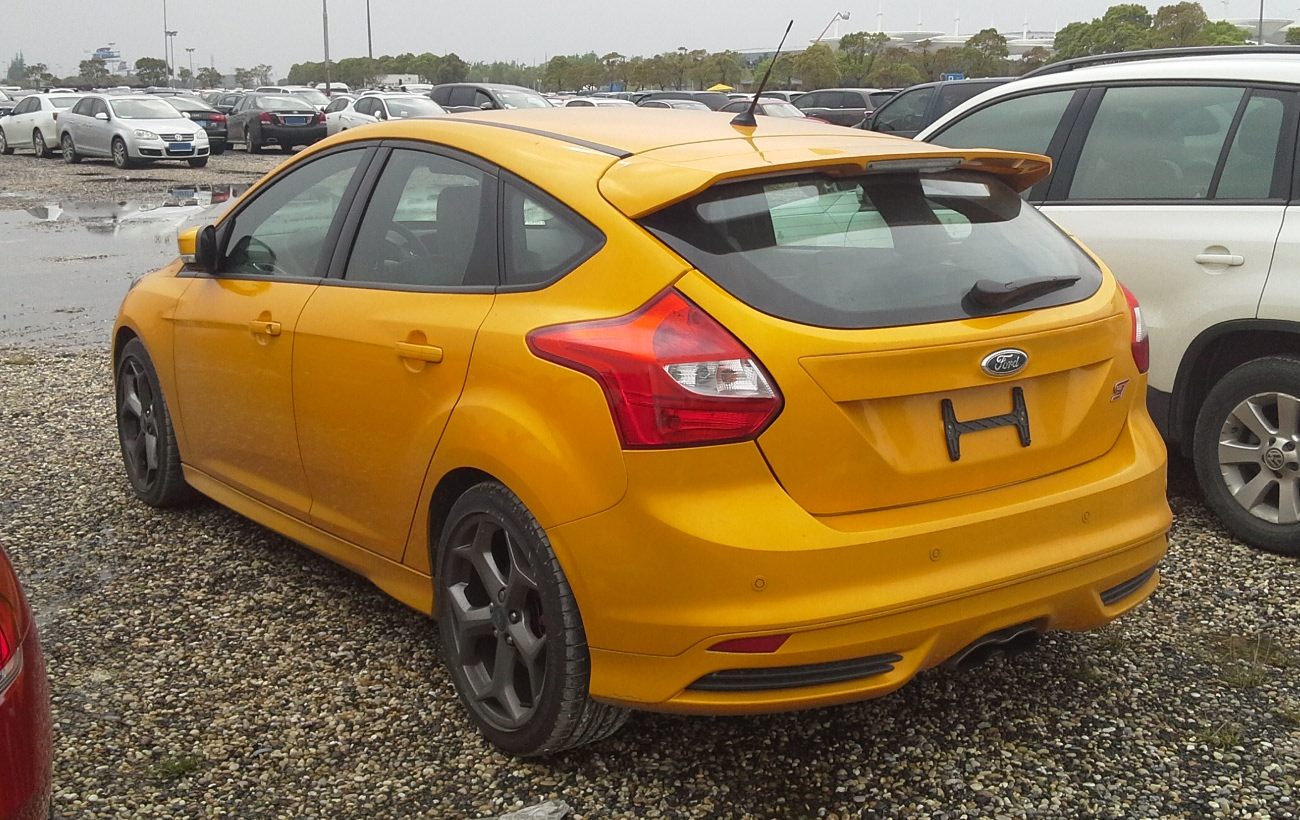
Ford Focus ST hatchback

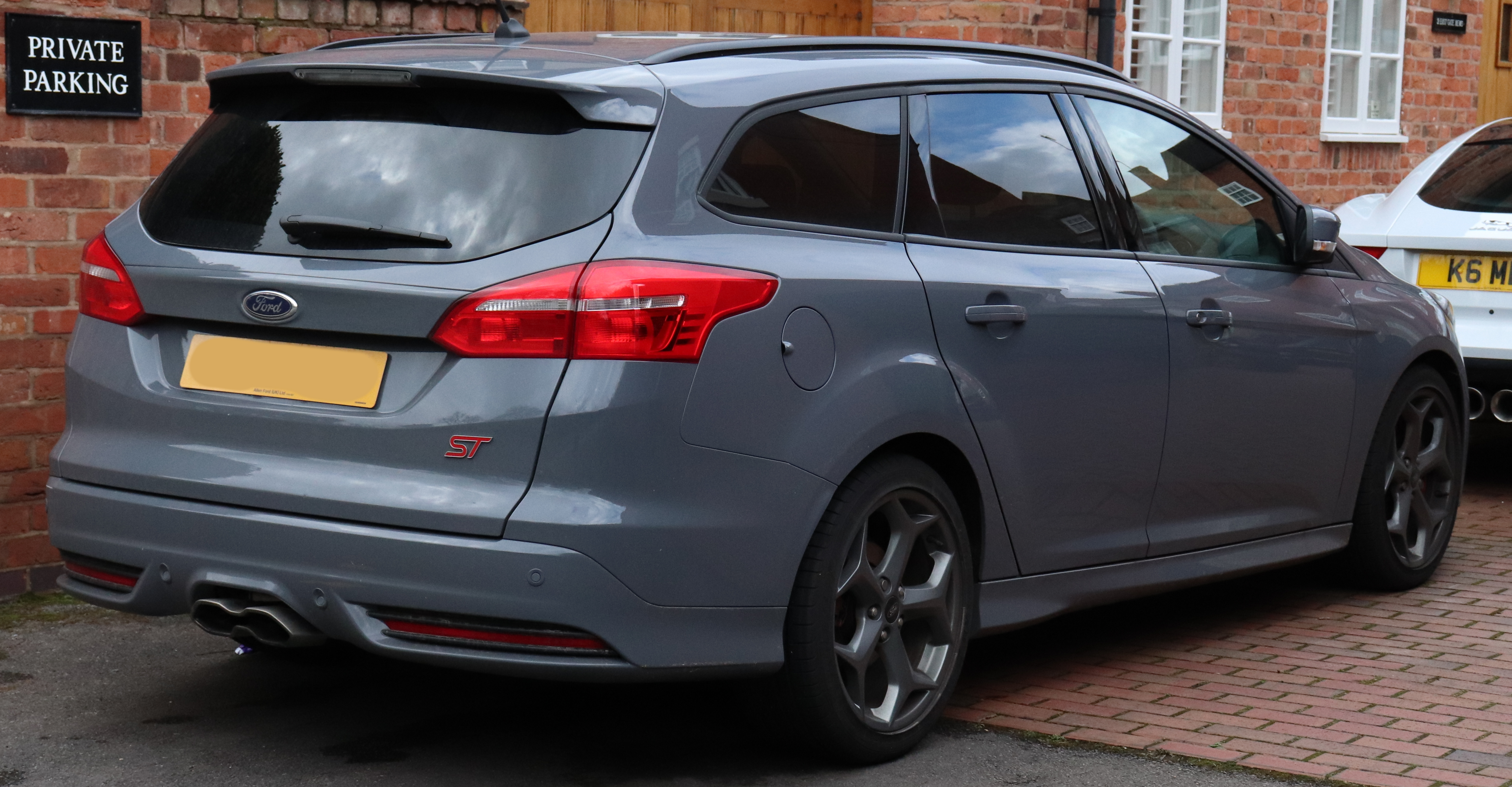
Ford Focus ST wagon

Beginning Summer 2012 (UK)/late 2012 in the US, Ford offered a new performance-oriented hot hatch Focus ST, as first revealed at the 2010 Paris Motor Show and then at the 2011 Frankfurt Motor Show when more details were announced, including the availability of an estate(wagon) version for European markets, and the possibility of a sports sedan version for North American markets.

The ST features a new, more aggressive exterior design, including a redesigned front bumper with larger air intakes and grille, larger rear wing, wider side sills, centre-exit exhaust, and alloy wheels. Inside, the car receives a trio of additional gauges mounted in the dashboard, faux-carbon fiber trim, and sport seats with body-coloured inserts and stitching. The car will be offered three trim options: ST1, ST2, and ST3; the same three options that were available with the MkII ST.

The ST used a 252 hp (188 kW) and 366 N⋅m (270 lb⋅ft) version of the 4-cylinder 2.0L EcoBoost engine, a gain of 25 hp above the previous Focus ST which used a larger 2.5L 5-cylinder engine. The ST will reach 100 kilometres per hour (62 mph) in 6.1 seconds, while its top speed was 248 kilometres per hour (154 mph). Compared to the previous ST, the new model had the same 0 to 100 km/h time and had a 2 mph higher top speed. Another significant improvement is weight; the new car was 30 kilograms (66 lb) lighter than its 5-cylinder powered predecessor.

The ST was featured in the 2012 film The Sweeney, a remake of the 1970s TV series of the same name. Ford gave six ST-badged Focuses to the production team.

=== Facelift (2015–2018) ===
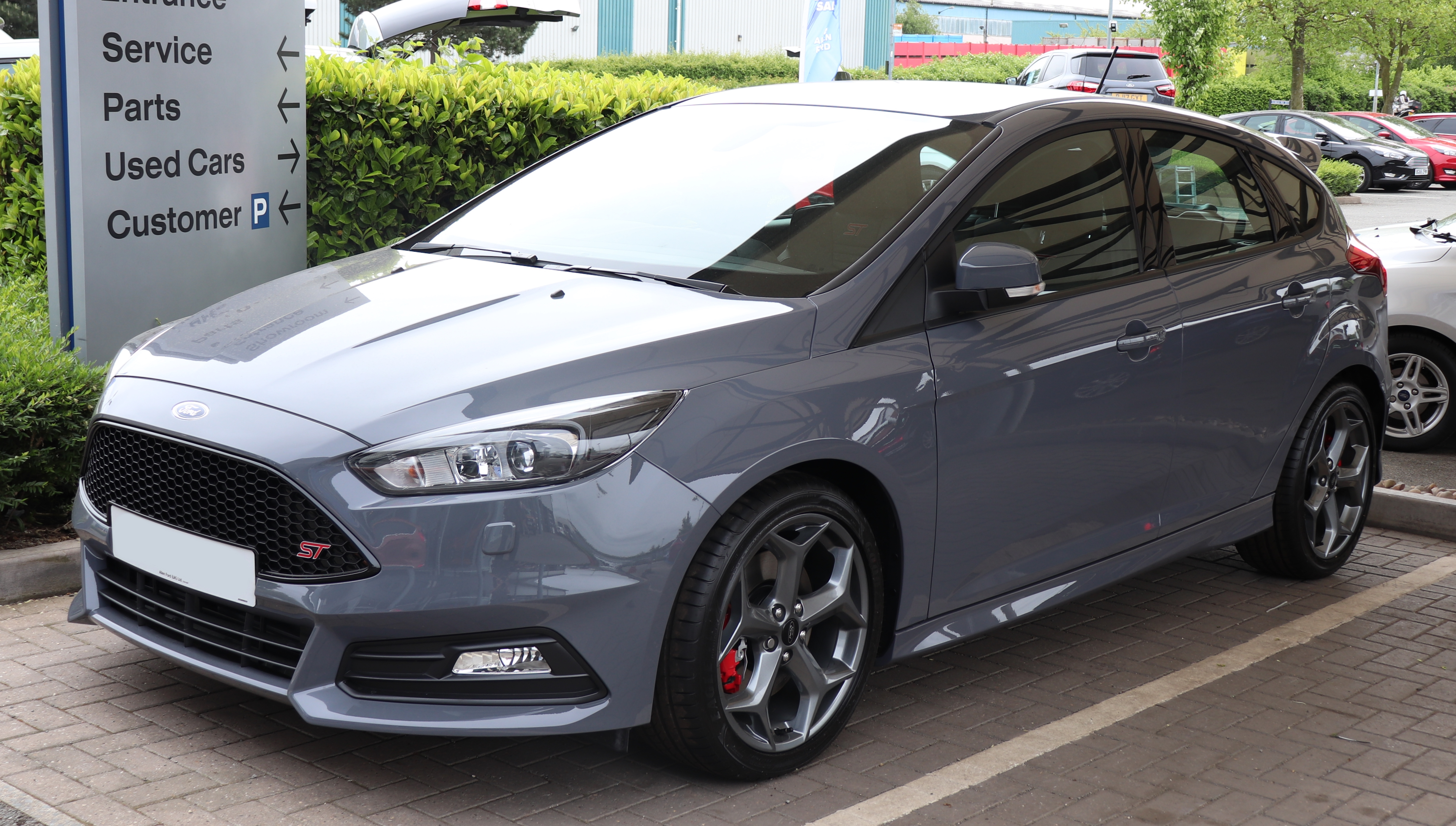
2018 Ford Focus ST-3 TDCi Automatic 2.0

For the 2015 model year, the ST continued to use the 252 hp (188 kW; 255 PS) 2.0L EcoBoost with a 6-speed manual gearbox in ST1, ST2 and ST3 trims for the European and US markets, and the single ST trim in the Australian market. Updates were made to the front and rear fascias to coincide with the changes implemented in the standard Focus, including the lights, grille, and rear diffuser. The availability of 5-door hatchback and estate (wagon) body styles remained unchanged. For the European markets, a 2.0L TDCi Duratorq Diesel engine was available for the ST with a 6-speed PowerShift automatic gearbox to rival the likes of the Volkswagen Golf GTD and the SEAT León FR. The 2.0L Duratorq's rated output is 182 hp (136 kW; 185 PS), and 300 lb⋅ft (407 N⋅m) of torque in the ST. Pricing and badging is the same for petrol and diesel models. The facelifted model has a slower steering ratio and lacks oil sump baffles.

== Focus RS ==
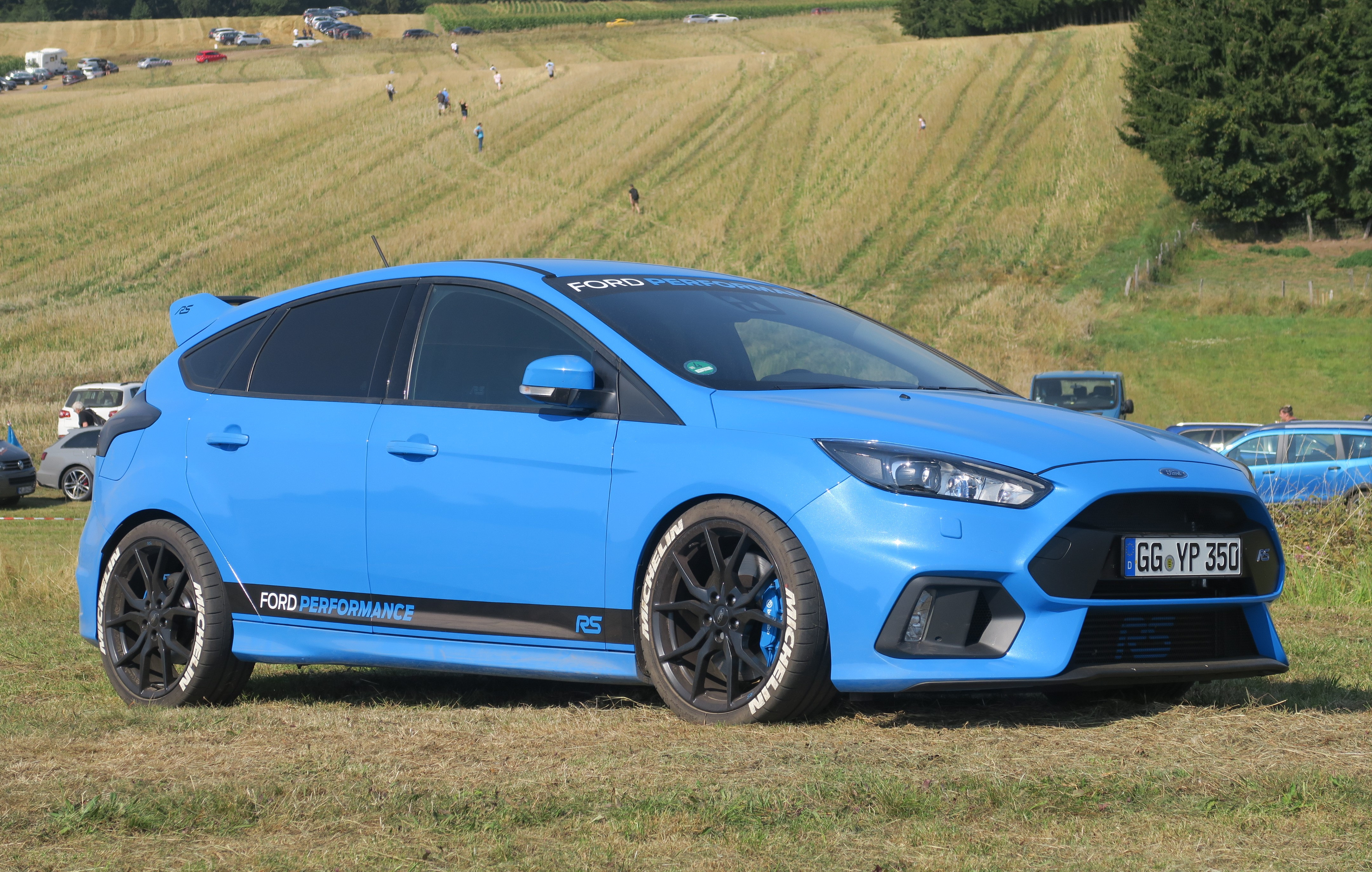
Ford Focus RS

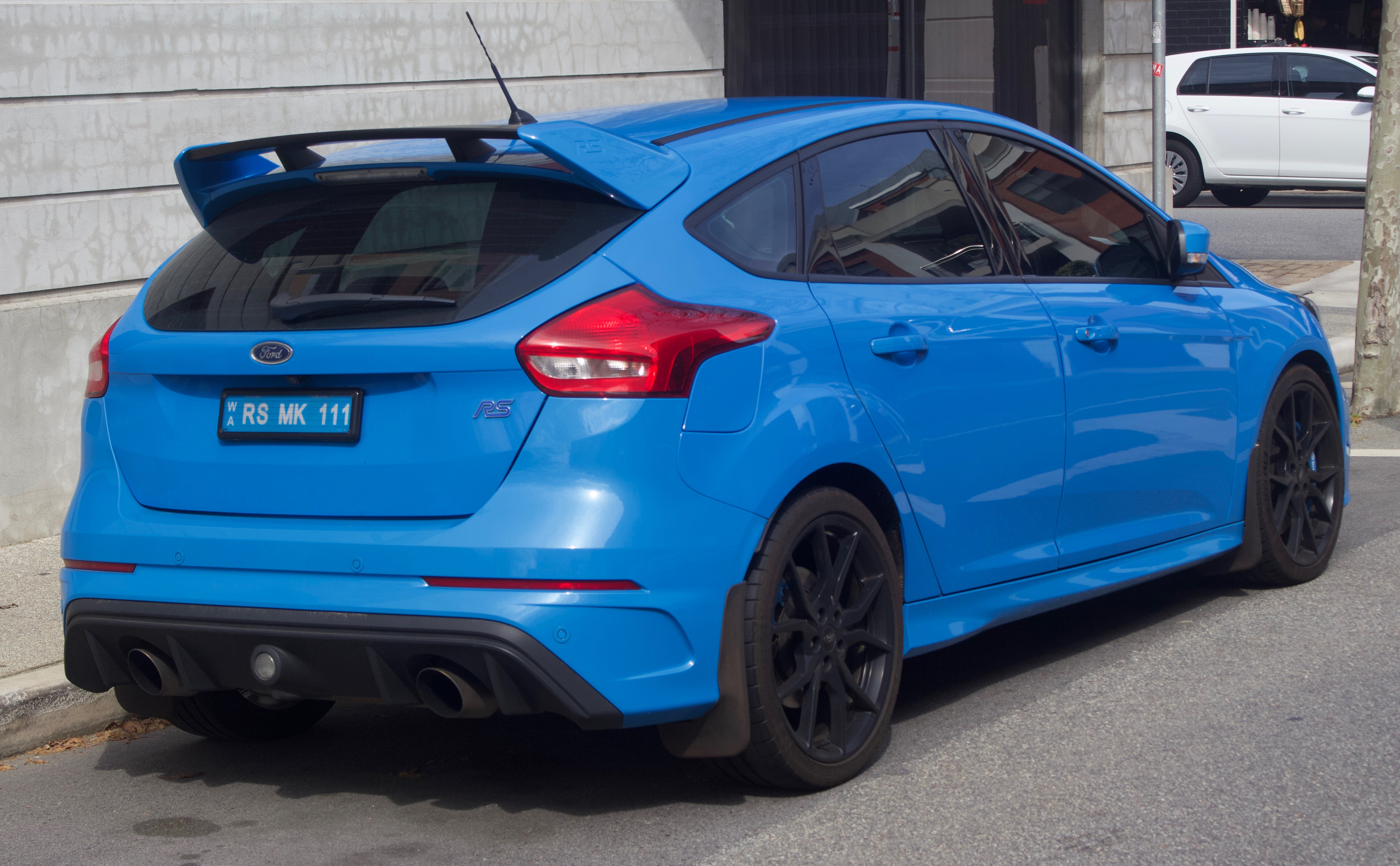
Ford Focus RS

Following the merger of Ford's North American Special Vehicle Team (SVT), the European TeamRS and the Australian FPV divisions to the development of Ford's global performance vehicles, Ford's Advanced Product Creation and Performance Vehicles director Hermann Salenbauch said that the decision to sell Ford Focus RS/SVT to North America depended on feedback from the media and customers. However, the product would only appear 2 years after the release of the third generation Focus models. On August 4, 2011, Ford's global boss for small cars, Gunnar Herrmann, revealed to magazine Drive that the third iteration of the hot-hatch was in the works. The new RS was expected to arrive towards the end of 2015 in Europe and the rest of the world; in North America it will arrive after 2015. On January 21, 2015, Ford released a teaser video previewing the 2015 Ford Focus RS and on February 3, hosted a web-streaming reveal event from Cologne, Germany.

At the 2015 Geneva Motor Show the production-ready MKIII Ford Focus RS was unveiled packing the turbocharged 2.3 L; 138.0 cu in (2,261 cc) EcoBoost engine found in the Mustang with over 320 hp (240 kW). In the Focus RS, the engine itself produces 350 bhp (355 PS; 261 kW) at 6000 rpm and 350 lb⋅ft (475 N⋅m) at 3200 rpm of torque. Power is sent to all four wheels via Ford's all-new Torque-Vectoring All-Wheel-Drive system with a rear-drive unit designed by GKN, as well as upgraded suspension and brakes. As well as that, the new Focus RS will be fitted with Drive Modes – including an industry-first Drift Mode that allows controlled oversteer drifts – and Launch Control. The RS will boast a model-specific aerodynamic package that helps to differentiate it from other Focus models. The RS is capable of accelerating to 100 km/h (62 mph) in 4.7 seconds. 2018 marked the final model year for the Ford Focus RS. Ford Performance released Final Edition vehicles with a new Quaife mechanical limited-slip differential. However, there were no upgrades to the power and torque figures from previous model years. The 2018 Focus RS was only available in 2 colours, Race Red and Nitrous Blue. Gloss black roof, spoiler, and mirror caps were added to differentiate the Final Edition. Only 1,000 2018 Ford Focus RS were available for U.S. drivers and 500 for Canada. As a final tribute to the RS, the UK only Heritage Edition was revealed to celebrate the strong bond between the UK market and Ford's performance vehicles. Finished in a unique Deep Orange colour, and fitted from the factory with the Mountune FPM 375 package boosting power from 345 bhp (257 kW; 350 PS) to 375 bhp (280 kW; 380 PS) and fitted with the Quaife LSD, only 50 were made and cost £7k more than the standard UK Focus RS.

== Marketing ==
The Ford Focus was promoted in The Amazing Race, a reality show featuring 11 teams racing around the world. The Focus was used in a few seasons as the mode of transportation for the racers. In the 18th installment, the 2012 Ford Focus was also used as a prize for the first team to complete a leg of the race.

== Motorsports ==
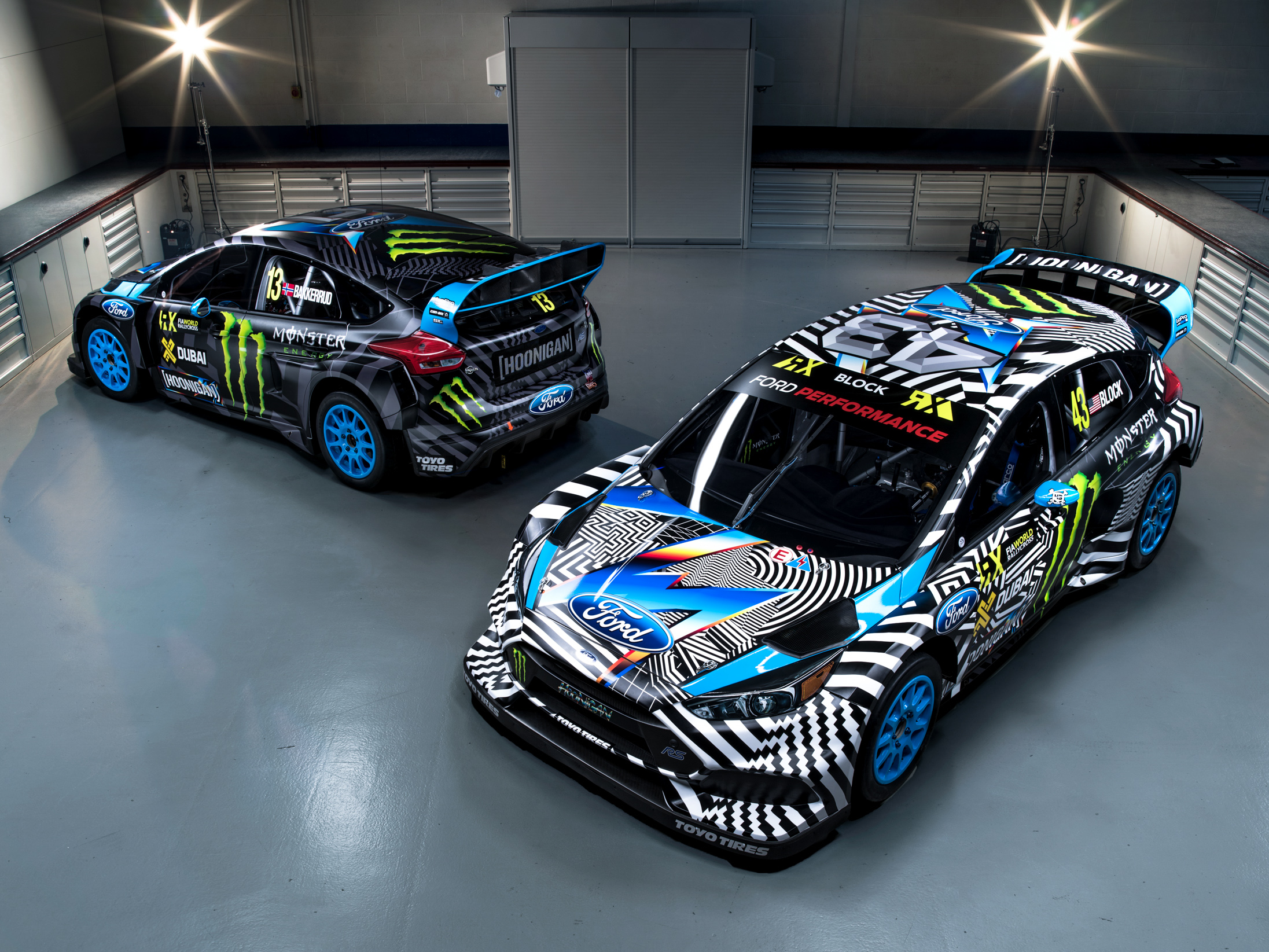
The rallycross cars of Andreas Bakkerud and Ken Block

Chip Ganassi Racing with Felix Sabates entered a Ford Focus in the IMSA Continental Tire SportsCar Challenge Street Tuner class in 2014.

Hoonigan Racing Division fielded two Ford Focus RS rallycross cars in the 2016 and 2017 FIA World Rallycross Championship with drivers Andreas Bakkerud and Ken Block. On September 4, 2017, Ford Performance and Hoonigan Racing Division announced their withdrawal from the World Rallycross Championship after the 2017 season.

== Appearance in media ==
A 2017 Focus RS appeared in Season 4, Episode 2 ("A Massive Hunt") of the Amazon Prime Video original show The Grand Tour. It was driven by Richard Hammond, who modified the car by removing the wheels and putting on caterpillar tracks. He also repainted the car from blue to black.

== Discontinuation ==
On May 4, 2018, the final 2018 Ford Focus was assembled at Ford Motor Company's Michigan Assembly Plant in Wayne, Michigan. The Michigan Assembly Plant will continue to produce the all-new 2019 Ford Ranger for North America. A crossover named the Ford Focus Active was planned to be imported from China. It was planned to be sold in North America for the 2020 model year. In August 2018, Ford canceled its plans to import the Chinese-built Focus Active to North America, citing tariff concerns.
