= ECOnetic =

Green vehicle produced by Ford of Europe

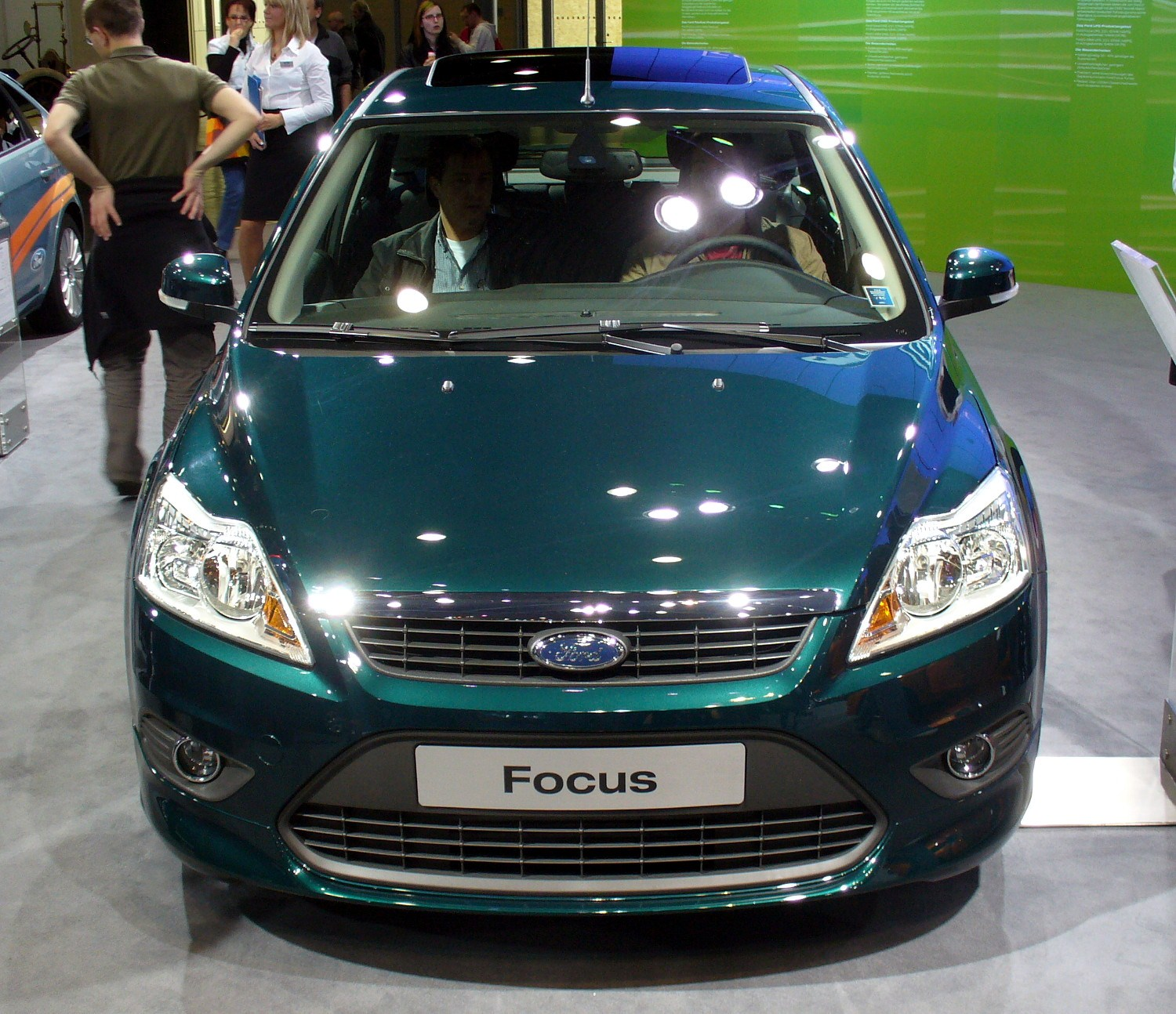
Front of a Series2 Ford Focus ECOnetic, showing smaller lower grill

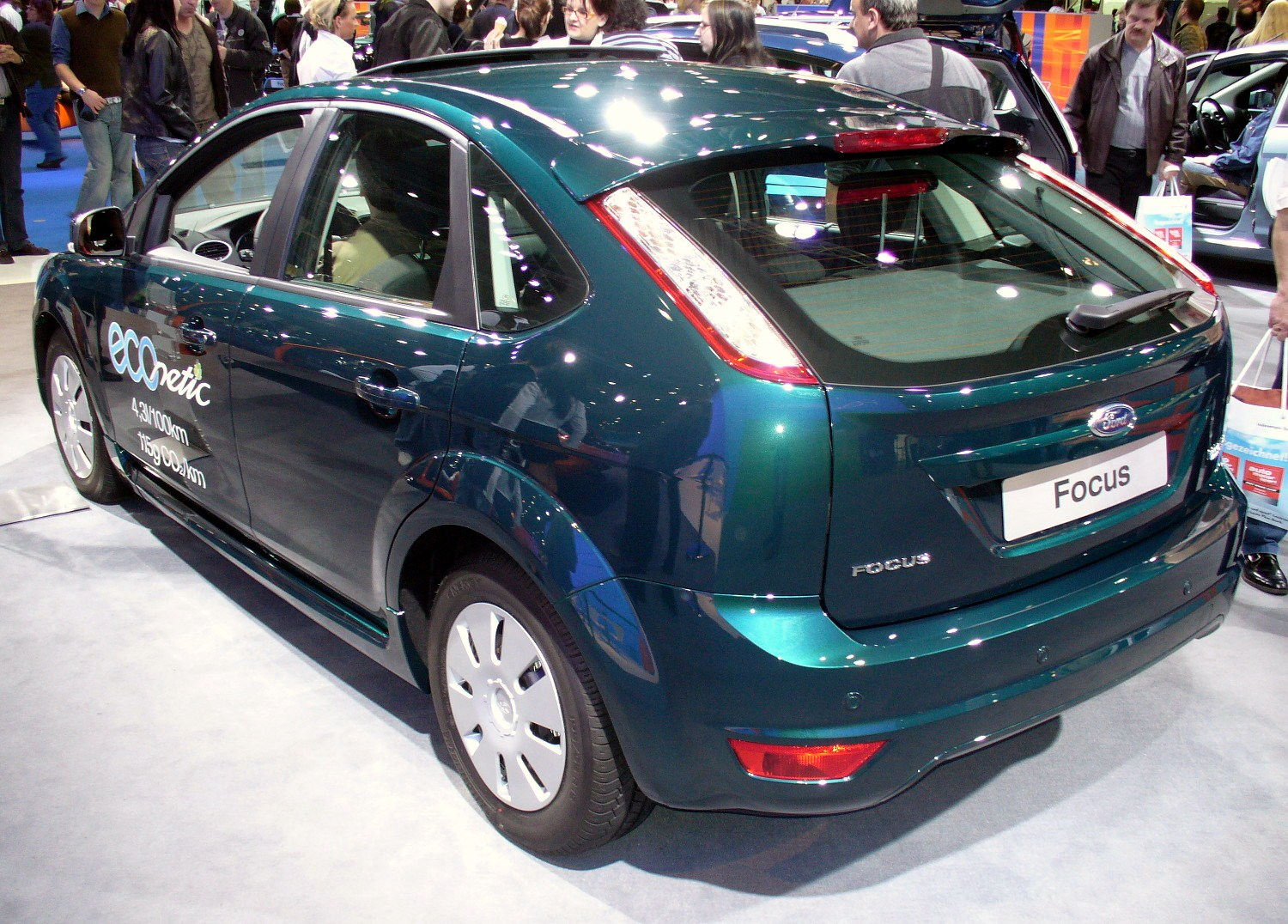
Side view of a Series2 Ford Focus ECOnetic, showing aerodynamic hubcaps on thinner low-resistance Michelin tyres

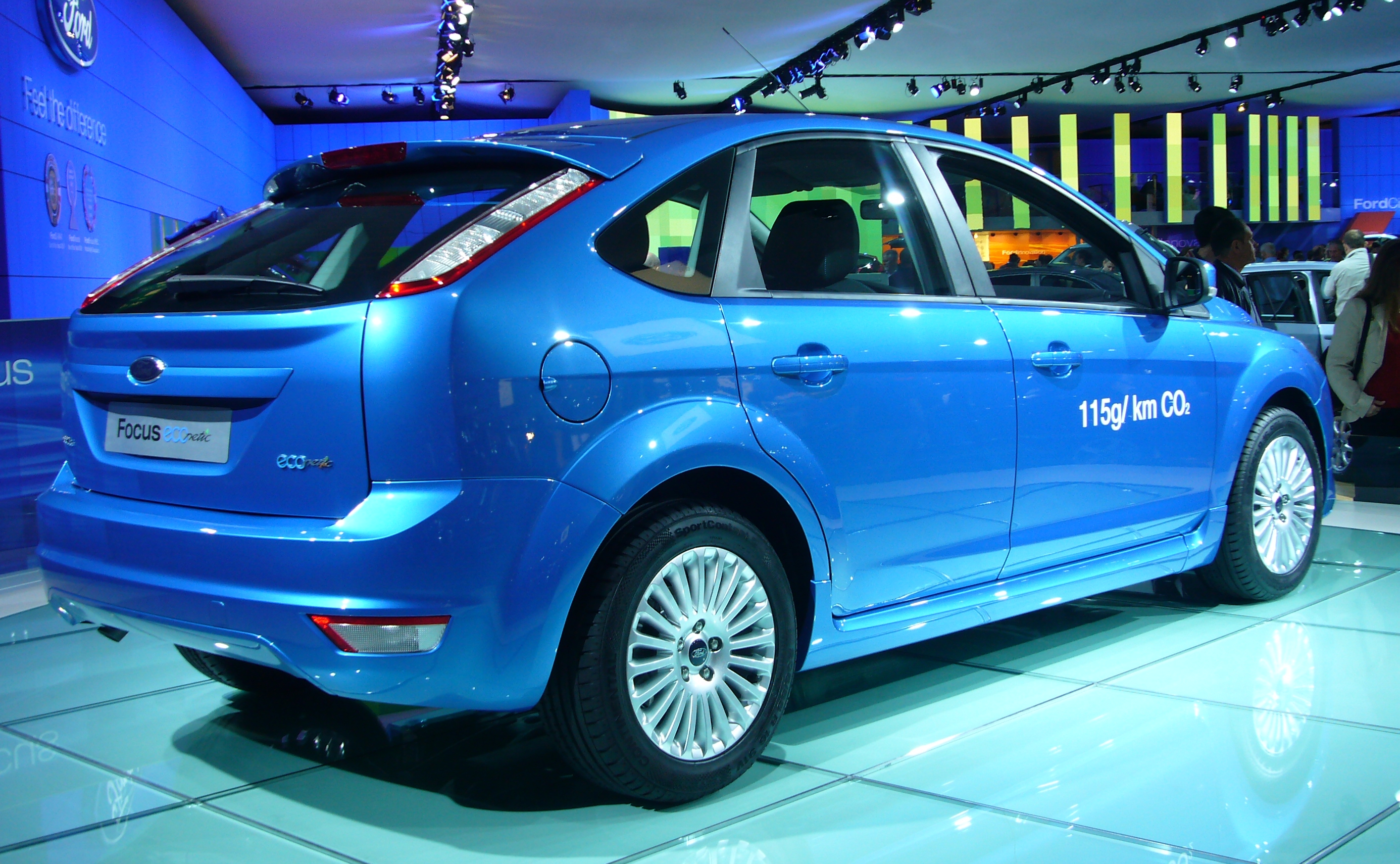
Rear quarter of Series2 revised Ford Focus ECOnetic

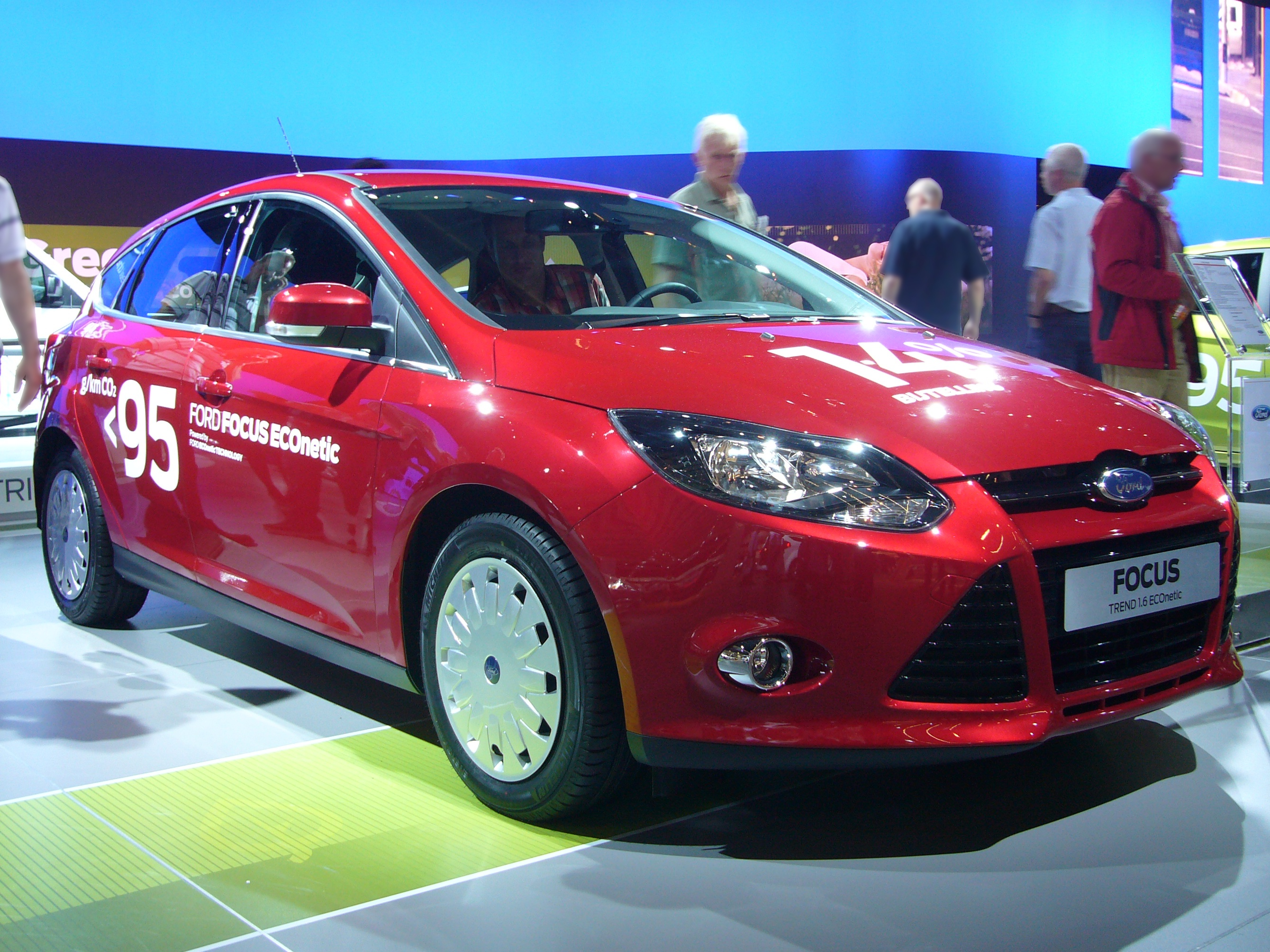
Front of prototype Series3 Ford Focus ECOnetic, showing closed lower grill and aerodynamic hubcaps on thinner low-resistance Michelin tyres

ECOnetic was a tradename for certain car models produced by Ford of Europe, introduced in 2008, consisting of one model in each of the Fiesta, the Focus and the Mondeo range, with an emphasis on higher fuel efficiency and low-CO_{2} emissions.

== Design philosophy ==
As opposed to developing hybrid vehicles like Prius, Ford of Europe took a different design philosophy: to create vehicles that are as fuel efficient as possible, without compromising driving experience. The resultant ECOnetic range focuses on improved design and refinement of existing technology, focusing on three main streams of improvement:

- Aerodynamics: models have a redesigned front bumper skirt, which are more aerodynamic, and reduces drag further through use of a smaller lower grill. The car is then lowered on its suspension to improve angle of address to the air, in the case of the Focus by 10 millimetres (0.39 in) on the front, and 8 millimetres (0.31 in) on the rear. To the side, skirts are introduced together with hubcaps designed to improve airflow. A new and extended rear spoiler reduces rear drag
- Resistance: Ford worked with Michelin to create a thinner tyre with lower rolling resistance. The engine's bearings are replaced with lower-resistance versions
- Efficiency: engineers re-mapped the 1.6-litre Duratorq TDCi engine, equipped with a coated Diesel Particulate Filter (cDPF), and recalibrated the power steering system. The ECOnetic was the first Ford car to use low-friction transmission oil, which is now uniform on all 1.6-litre diesel European-produced Fords. The 2012 Focus version has a six-speed gearbox, with sixth gear an overdrive.

== Models ==
First announced in late-2007, Ford proposed ECOnetic models in the Fiesta, Focus and Mondeo ranges. The first cars were available to order from dealers in early 2008, priced at £250 above the "Style" models. Delivered to United Kingdom from April 2008, the models was in the lowest bracket of vehicle excise duty and exempt from the London congestion charge.

The second generation Fiesta ECOnetic was launched at the 2008 British International Motor Show. To encourage drivers to be efficient, a green upwards arrow-shaped indicator light within the dashboard's rev counter signals to the driver when to change up to a higher gear for optimum fuel efficiency and thus economy, later also introduced to the Focus model.

The 2012 Focus ECOnetic model includes: Smart Regenerative Charging to reduce alternator resistance; Auto-Start-Stop; electrically operated front grille shutter, to improve high speed aerodynamics.

Current ECOnetic vehicles
Model	Engine Capacity CC	MPG Combined Cycle	CO_{2} g/km	UK VED
Fiesta	1600	76.3	98	£0
Focus	1600	74.2	99	£0

== North America ==
It is not presently planned to introduce ECOnetic models to the North American market, because, as Business Week noted, the company "doesn't believe it could charge enough to make money on an imported ECOnetic" and doesn't think it would sell enough of the model (350,000/year) to justify the $350 million in upgrades required at their Mexico plant to manufacture it.
