= Ford Focus (second generation, North America) =

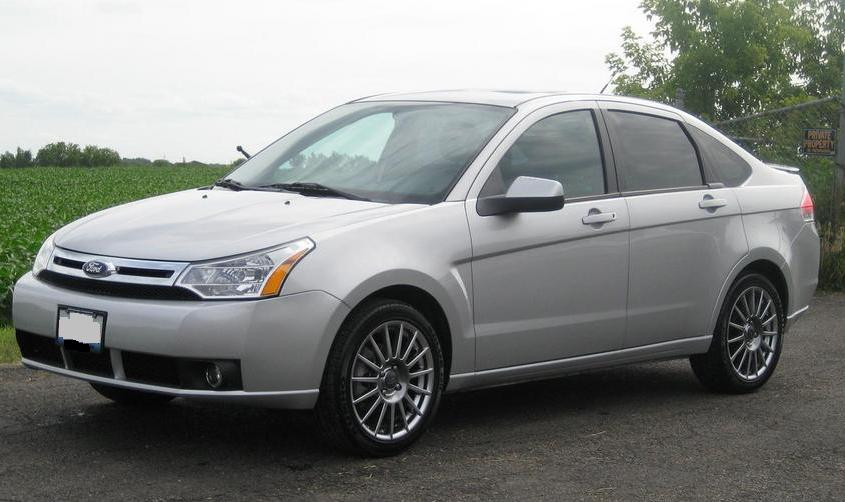

Overview
- Manufacturer: Ford
- Production: September 2007–December 2010
- Model years: 2008–2011
- Assembly: Wayne, Michigan, United States (Wayne Stamping & Assembly)
- Designer: Lon Zaback (2005)

Body and chassis
- Class: Compact car / Small family car (C)
- Body style: 4-door sedan 2-door coupe

Powertrain
- Engine: 2.0 L Duratec I4 (gasoline)
- Transmission: 4-speed automatic 5-speed manual

Dimensions
- Wheelbase: 102.9 in (2,614 mm)
- Length: 175 in (4,445 mm)
- Width: Coupe: 67.9 in (1,725 mm); Sedan: 67.8 in (1,722 mm)
- Height: 58.6 in (1,488 mm)
- Curb weight: 2,588–2,642 lb (1,174–1,198 kg)

Chronology
- Predecessor: Ford Focus (first generation)
- Successor: Ford Focus (third generation)

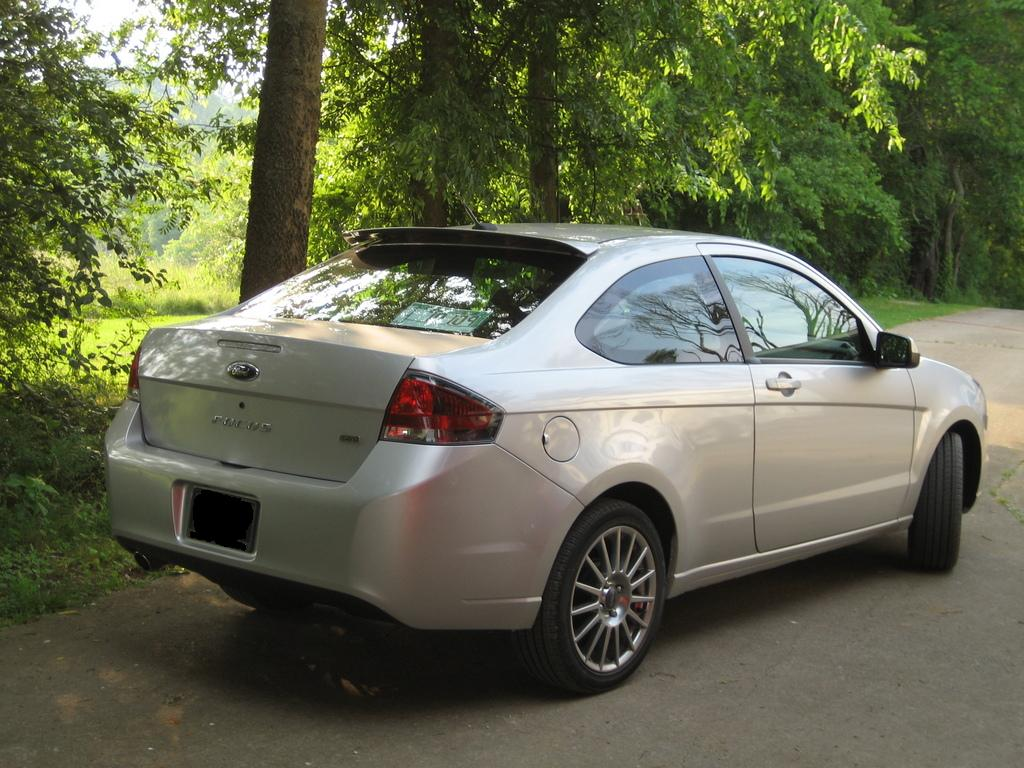
2009 Ford Focus SES coupe (note the rear roof spoiler found only on SES coupes)

The restyled North American second generation Ford Focus was sold by Ford as either a two-door coupe and 4-door sedan — the hatchbacks and wagon were discontinued.

The 2.3-liter Duratec engine was discontinued for the redesign, leaving only the 2.0-liter Duratec 20 engine. Power was increased in the 2.0-liter engine, up to 140 hp (104 kW) from 136 hp (101 kW), along with other changes to increase fuel efficiency. The chassis was lightened and stiffened and overall weight was decreased by 30 lb (14 kg) from the previous model. Highway mileage was rated at 35 mpg_{‑US} (6.7 L/100 km; 42 mpg_{‑imp}) using the new 2008 United States Environmental Protection Agency standards.

The interior was redesigned, including new seats, a new dashboard design with message center atop of the dashboard, ambient lighting, dashboard panels that simulate brushed aluminum, and Ford's voice-controlled Sync audio/Bluetooth system. Optional ambient lighting in the Focus uses LEDs placed in the front and rear footwells and the cup holders. Standard equipment includes a tire pressure monitoring system as mandated by the TREAD Act. Also included in the redesign was a support beam behind the dashboard for extra structural rigidity.

The second generation Focus debuted at the 2007 North American International Auto Show. Production stopped in late 2010, with the switchover to that of the third generation Focus taking until early spring 2011 due to the total refitting of the Michigan Assembly Plant, and to give dealers time for stock depletion. Despite this, some dealers ran a 50% sale on 2011 Focuses as of mid-2011, as they were forced to simultaneously offer both it and the 2012 model.

== Safety ==
The Insurance Institute for Highway Safety (IIHS) has given the Focus a "Good" overall rating in the frontal offset crash test and an "Acceptable" rating in the side impact test. Front and rear side curtain airbags and front seat-mounted torso airbags are standard.

2009 National Highway Traffic Safety Administration (NHTSA) Crash Test Ratings (coupe):

- Frontal Driver:
- Frontal Passenger:
- Side Driver:
- Side Rear Passenger:
- Rollover:

2009 National Highway Traffic Safety Administration (NHTSA) Crash Test Ratings (sedan):

- Frontal Driver:
- Frontal Passenger:
- Side Driver:
- Side Rear Passenger:
- Rollover:

== Sales and reception ==
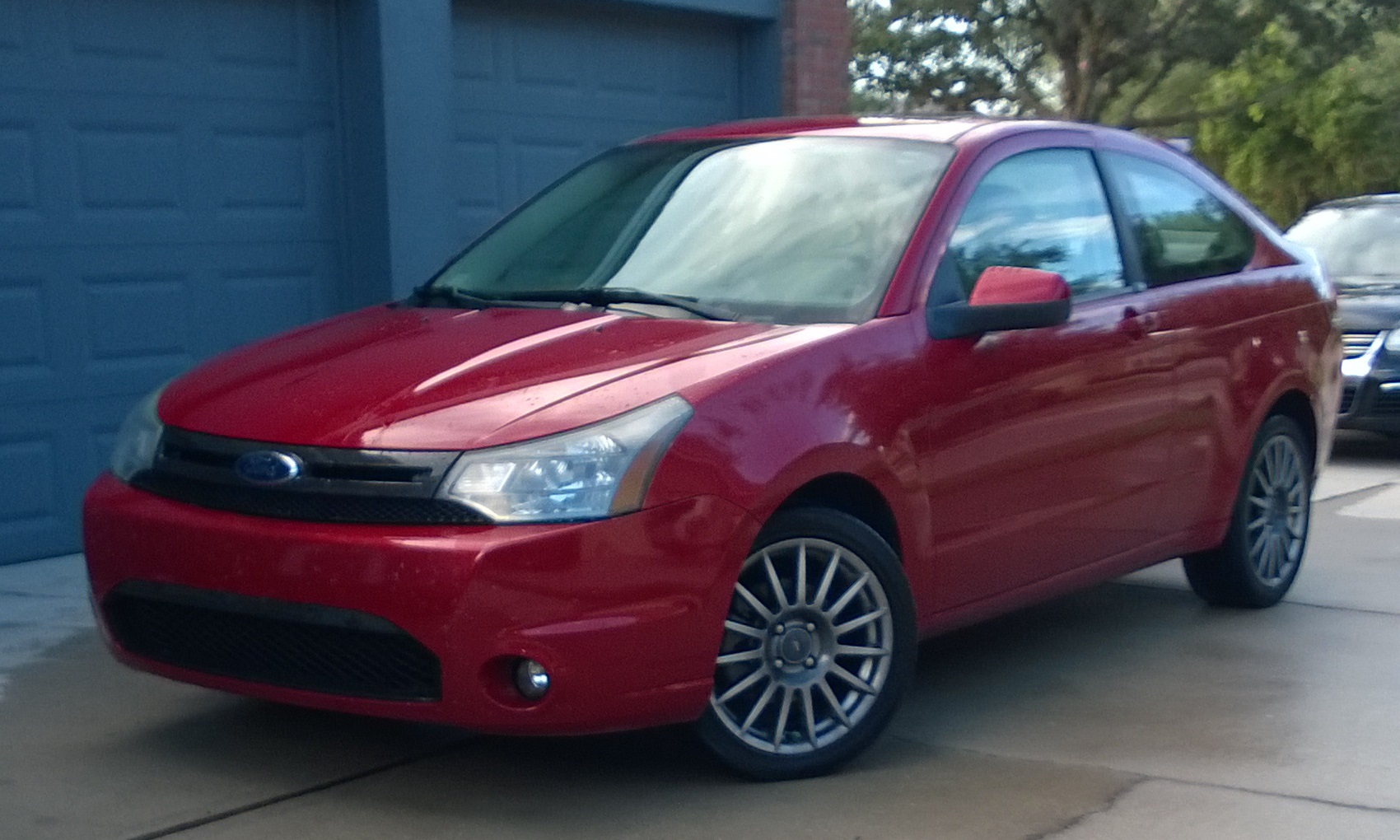
A dark grille and altered front-fascia distinguished later SES models. Those equipped with a manual transmission also received three extra horsepower over the basic trims.

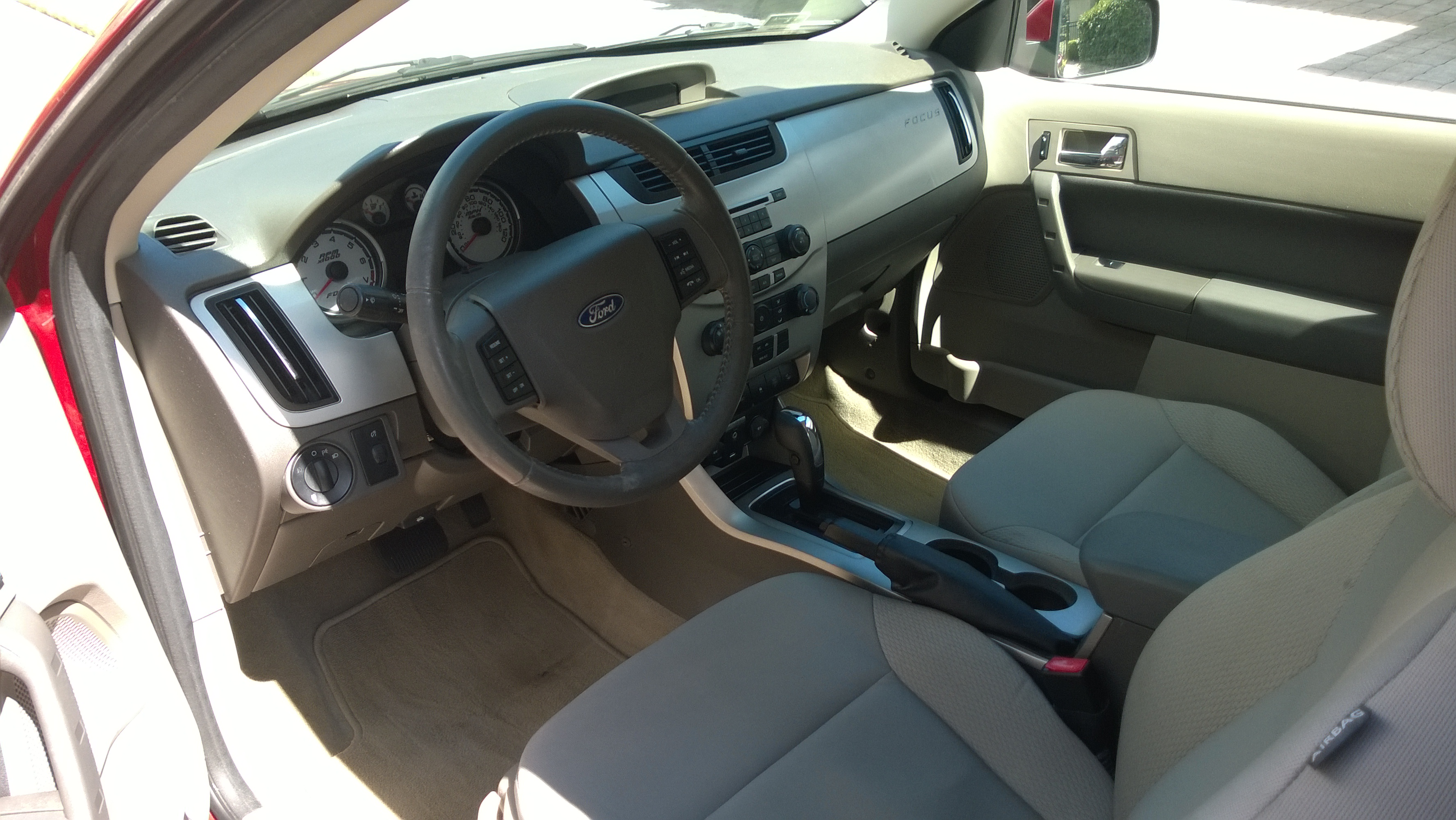
Dashboard

Like many compact cars, demand for the Focus increased because of high gasoline prices in 2008. At that time, the Focus took 7.6 percent of the U.S. small car market. To meet this increasing demand, Ford increased output for 2008 by 30%.

Where second generation North American Focus models continue with the C170 platform beginning with the 2008 model year in sedan and coupe configurations — the international Focus introduced in 2005 employed the newer C1 platform for sedan, hatchback (3 and 5-door) and wagon configurations. The North American Focus was succeeded by the Focus Mk III that was the same as the international version except for some minor differences in engines and some features.

== Running changes ==
Being an interim facelift of an old model, changes were few and minor. For 2009, the SEL trim for sedans was added and the chrome-plastic fake grilles on the front fenders were deleted from all models. Also, Coupes equipped with a 5-speed manual transmission, but not a Duratec 20E PZEV engine, received a horsepower increase to 143 hp (107 kW; 145 PS), compared to the 140 hp (104 kW; 142 PS) found in the sedan. A standard rear seat dome light was added for the 2010 model year.

Changes for the short 2011 model run were limited. The coupe was discontinued in preparation for the new (2012 MY) 4-door hatchback or sedan, set to arrive in the spring of 2011. Production of the sedan ended in the beginning of December 2010.

== Body styles and trims ==
Year	Model	Trim levels
2008	2-door Coupe	S, SE, SES
2008	4-door Sedan	S, SE, SES
2009	2-door Coupe	SE, SES
2009	4-door Sedan	S, SE, SES, SEL
2010	2-door Coupe	SE, SES
2010	4-door Sedan	S, SE, SES, SEL
2011	4-door Sedan	S, SE, SES, SEL

== Focus FCV ==
The "Focus FCV" was a hydrogen powered version of the second generation North American model. Just before Bill Ford (the great grandson of Henry Ford) stepped down as the CEO of Ford on September 5, 2006, he devoted much of his time and energy to researching this new technology of hydrogen cars. He was eager to make a Hydrogen powered car for Ford, which had already been successful with its hybrid cars, such as the Ford Escape Hybrid. However, Bill felt it was time to make something newer, more fuel efficient, and more advanced.

The car was powered by a Ballard 902 fuel cell. The fuel cell compresses hydrogen in its 5,000 PSI tank and creates electricity when the hydrogen was separated into protons and electrons. The car itself was powered by two sources: one source was from the fuel cell itself and the second was from the car's battery pack. It was considered a hybrid because it was powered by two different sources. The car's only byproduct is water which, is made when the hydrogen from the fuel cell contacts the oxygen from outside. It has a top speed of 80 MPH and a driving range of 150 to 200 miles. Ford delivered 18 cars to various cities within the United States with one car later relocated to Iceland. It was a zero emissions vehicle.
