= 2020 Macau Guia Race =

Race details
| Date | 19–22 November |
| Official name | Macau Guia Race |
| Location | Circuito da Guia, Macau Peninsula, Macau |
| Course | Temporary street circuit 6.12 km (3.80 mi) |
- Supporting
| Distance | Race 1; 8 laps, 40.216 km (24.989 mi); Race 2; 12 laps, 40.216 km (24.989 mi) |
- Qualification Race

Pole
| Driver | (United Kingdom) Robert Huff | Team MG XPower |
- Time 2:31.745

Fastest lap
| Driver | (United Kingdom) Robert Huff | Team MG XPower |
| Time | 2:34.888 |

Podium
| First | (United Kingdom) Robert Huff | Team MG XPower |
| Second | (China) Ma Qing Hua | Shell Teamwork Lynk & Co Motorsport |
| Third | (Macau) Filipe de Souza | T. A. Motorsport |
- Main Race

Fastest lap
| Driver | (United Kingdom) Robert Huff | Team MG XPower |
| Time | 2:35.090 |

Podium
| First | (China) Jason Zhang | Shell Teamwork Lynk & Co Motorsport |
| Second | (Hong Kong) Sunny Wong | Shell Teamwork Lynk & Co Motorsport |
| Third | (Hong Kong) Lo Sze Ho | Maximum Racing |

The 2020 Macau Guia Race was the fifth edition of the Macau Guia Race under the TCR Regulations held at Guia Circuit in Macau on 19–22 November 2020. The race was contested with TCR touring cars and run in support of the 2020 edition of the Macau Grand Prix. The race also served as the final round of the 2020 TCR China Touring Car Championship.

Due to the impact of the COVID-19 pandemic, this race was not held as planned, as part of the 2020 World Touring Car Cup, instead only serving as part of the local China championship.

== Teams and drivers ==
The following teams and drivers are entered into the event:

| Entrant | Car | No. | Driver |
|---|---|---|---|
| (Macau) MacPro Racing Team | Honda Civic Type R TCR (FK8) | 1 | (Macau) Eurico de Jesus |
| (China) TPR | Audi RS 3 LMS TCR | 2 | (China) Wo Wen Fa |
| (China) Champ Motorsport | Audi RS 3 LMS TCR | 3 | (China) Yang Xi |
| (China) Xinjun 326 Racing Team | Audi RS 3 LMS TCR | 5 | (China) Wu Yifan |
| (China) Team NewFaster | Audi RS 3 LMS TCR | 6 | (China) Zou Baolong |
| (China) Fancy Aspect | Volkswagen Golf GTI TCR | 7 | (China) Yan Chuang |
| (Macau) Elegant Racing Team | CUPRA León TCR | 8 | (Macau) Wong Kiang Kuan |
| (China) Team MG XPower | MG 6 X-Power TCR | 9 | (Macau) Rodolfo Ávila |
| (China) Team MG XPower | MG 6 X-Power TCR | 10 | (United Kingdom) Robert Huff |
| (Hong Kong) TRC | Honda Civic Type R TCR (FK2) | 12 | (Hong Kong) Wong Chin Hung |
| (Macau) Elegant Racing Team | CUPRA León TCR | 16 | (Hong Kong) Kenneth Look |
| (China) Team MG XPower | MG 6 X-Power TCR | 18 | (China) Zhendong Zhang |
| (China) Shaanxi Tianshi Racing Team | Audi RS 3 LMS TCR | 19 | (China) Hu Heng |
| (Hong Kong) Maximum Racing | Honda Civic Type R TCR (FK2) | 21 | (Hong Kong) Ivan Szeto |
| (China) Team MG XPower | MG 6 X-Power TCR | 22 | (Hong Kong) Andy Yan |
| (China) Zhang Han Biao | Audi RS 3 LMS TCR | 23 | (China) Zhang Han Biao |
| (China) T. A. Motorsport | Audi RS 3 LMS TCR | 26 | (Macau) Filipe de Souza |
| (Hong Kong) Maximum Racing | Honda Civic Type R TCR (FK2) | 28 | (Hong Kong) Lo Sze Ho |
| (China) Shell Teamwork Lynk & Co Motorsport | Lynk & Co 03 TCR | 29 | (Hong Kong) Sunny Wong |
| (Taiwan) Z.Speed Racing | Audi RS 3 LMS TCR | 33 | (Hong Kong) Wong Lok Fu Michael |
| (China) T. A. Motorsport | Volkswagen Golf GTI TCR | 35 | (Macau) Kevin Lam Ka Chun |
| (China) Shell Teamwork Lynk & Co Motorsport | Lynk & Co 03 TCR | 36 | (China) Jason Zhang |
| (Japan) Endless Sports | Alfa Romeo Giulietta TCR | 45 | (Hong Kong) Lung Yiu |
| (China) Team NewFaster | Audi RS 3 LMS TCR | 51 | (Hong Kong) Henry Lee Jr. |
| (China) Giti Tire Motorsport By Champ Motorsport | Volkswagen Golf GTI TCR | 53 | (Hong Kong) Ng Chi Leung |
| (China) Shell Teamwork Lynk & Co Motorsport | Lynk & Co 03 TCR | 55 | (China) Ma Qing Hua |
| (China) AHRT Autohome Racing Team | Lynk & Co 03 TCR | 61 | (China) Qi Lin |
| (China) Sony Kinetic Energy Team | Audi RS 3 LMS TCR | 66 | (Macau) Kin Veng Ng |
| (Hong Kong) TRC | Honda Civic Type R TCR (FK8) | 68 | (Hong Kong) James Tang |
| (China) Team NewFaster | Audi RS 3 LMS TCR | 77 | (China) Sun Jun Long |
| (China) Team NewFaster | Audi RS 3 LMS TCR | 81 | (China) Huang Chu Han |
| (Macau) MacPro Racing Team | Honda Civic Type R TCR (FK8) | 93 | (Macau) Ryan Wong |
| (China) Falcon Racing Team | Volkswagen Golf GTI TCR | 99 | (China) Wei Hang He |

== Results ==
=== Qualifying ===
| Pos. | No. | Name | Team | Car | Time |
|---|---|---|---|---|---|
| 1 | 10 | (United Kingdom) Robert Huff | Team MG XPower | MG 6 X-Power TCR | 2:31.745 |
| 2 | 55 | (China) Ma Qing Hua | Shell Teamwork Lynk & Co Motorsport | Lynk & Co 03 TCR | 2:33.631 |
| 3 | 26 | (Macau) Filipe de Souza | T. A. Motorsport | Audi RS 3 LMS TCR | 2:33.770 |
| 4 | 36 | (China) Jason Zhang | Shell Teamwork Lynk & Co Motorsport | Lynk & Co 03 TCR | 2:34.830 |
| 5 | 9 | (Macau) Rodolfo Ávila | Team MG XPower | MG 6 X-Power TCR | 2:35.460 |
| 6 | 51 | (Hong Kong) Henry Lee Jr. | Team Newfaster | Audi RS 3 LMS TCR | 2:35.936 |
| 7 | 29 | (Hong Kong) Sunny Wong | Shell Teamwork Lynk & Co Motorsport | Lynk & Co 03 TCR | 2:36.082 |
| 8 | 22 | (Hong Kong) Andy Yan | Team MG XPower | MG 6 X-Power TCR | 2:36.095 |
| 9 | 28 | (Hong Kong) Lo Sze Ho | Maximum Racing | Honda Civic Type R TCR (FK2) | 2:36.361 |
| 10 | 1 | (Macau) Eurico de Jesus | MacPro Racing Team | Honda Civic Type R TCR (FK8) | 2:38.094 |
| 11 | 68 | (Hong Kong) James Tang | TRC | Honda Civic Type R TCR (FK8) | 2:38.584 |
| 12 | 3 | (China) Yang Xi | Champ Motorsport | Audi RS 3 LMS TCR | 2:40.650 |
| 13 | 23 | (China) Zhang Han Biao | Zhang Han Biao | Audi RS 3 LMS TCR | 2:41.278 |
| 14 | 93 | (Macau) Ryan Wong | MacPro Racing Team | Honda Civic Type R TCR (FK8) | 2:41.805 |
| 15 | 45 | (Hong Kong) Lung Yiu | Endless Sports | Alfa Romeo Giulietta TCR | 2:42.227 |
| 16 | 18 | (China) Zhendong Zhang | Team MG XPower | MG 6 X-Power TCR | 2:42.360 |
| 17 | 7 | (China) Yan Chuang | Fancy Aspect | Volkswagen Golf GTI TCR | 2:42.397 |
| 18 | 6 | (China) Zou Baolong | Team NewFaster | Audi RS 3 LMS TCR | 2:42.826 |
| 19 | 61 | (China) Qi Lin | AHRT Autohome Racing Team | Lynk & Co 03 TCR | 2:42.899 |
| 20 | 5 | (China) Yifan Wu | Xinjun 326 Racing Team | Audi RS 3 LMS TCR | 2:42.903 |
| 21 | 21 | (Hong Kong) Ivan Szeto | Maximum Racing | Honda Civic Type R TCR (FK2) | 2:43.015 |
| 22 | 19 | (China) Heng Hu | Shaanxi Tianshi Racing Team | Audi RS 3 LMS TCR | 2:43.439 |
| 23 | 8 | (Macau) Wong Kiang Kuan | Elegant Racing Team | CUPRA León TCR | 2:43.921 |
| 24 | 16 | (Hong Kong) Kenneth Look | Elegant Racing Team | CUPRA León TCR | 2:44.706 |
| 25 | 2 | (China) Wo Wen Fa | TPR | Audi RS 3 LMS TCR | 2:45.996 |
| 26 | 33 | (Hong Kong) Michael Wong | Z.Speed Racing | Audi RS 3 LMS TCR | 2:46.244 |
| 27 | 35 | (Macau) Kevin Lam Ka Chun | T. A. Motorsport | Volkswagen Golf GTI TCR | 2:46.505 |
| 28 | 12 | (Hong Kong) Wong Chin Hung | TRC | Honda Civic Type R TCR (FK2) | 2:48.942 |
| 29 | 77 | (China) Sun Jun Long | Team NewFaster | Audi RS 3 LMS TCR | 2:51.021 |
| 30 | 53 | (Hong Kong) Ng Chi Leung | Giti Tire Motorsport By Champ Motorsport | Volkswagen Golf GTI TCR | 2:51.752 |
| 31 | 66 | (Macau) Kin Veng Ng | Sony Kinetic Energy Team | Audi RS 3 LMS TCR | 2:53.422 |
115% time: 2:54.506
| — | 99 | (China) Wei Hang He | Falcon Racing Team | Volkswagen Golf GTI TCR | 2:56.613 |
| — | 81 | (China) Huang Chu Han | Team NewFaster | Audi RS 3 LMS TCR | – |

=== Qualification Race ===
| Pos. | No. | Name | Team | Car | Laps | Time/Retired | Grid | Points |
|---|---|---|---|---|---|---|---|---|
| 1 | **10** | **(United Kingdom) Robert Huff** | **Team MG XPower** | **MG 6 X-Power TCR** | **7** | **00:58:40.405** | **1** | **18** |
| 2 | 55 | (China) Ma Qing Hua | Shell Teamwork Lynk & Co Motorsport | Lynk & Co 03 TCR | 7 | +3.110 | 2 | 15 |
| 3 | 26 | (Macau) Filipe de Souza | T. A. Motorsport | Audi RS 3 LMS TCR | 7 | +3.292 | 3 | |
| 4 | 36 | (China) Jason Zhang | Shell Teamwork Lynk & Co Motorsport | Lynk & Co 03 TCR | 7 | +3.781 | 4 | 13 |
| 5 | 29 | (Hong Kong) Sunny Wong | Shell Teamwork Lynk & Co Motorsport | Lynk & Co 03 TCR | 7 | +7.021 | 7 | 11 |
| 6 | 28 | (Hong Kong) Lo Sze Ho | Maximum Racing | Honda Civic Type R TCR (FK2) | 7 | +7.165 | 9 | |
| 7 | 22 | (Hong Kong) Andy Yan | Team MG XPower | MG 6 X-Power TCR | 7 | +7.165 | 9 | 9 |
| 8 | 18 | (China) Zhendong Zhang | Team MG XPower | MG 6 X-Power TCR | 7 | +8.754 | 16 | 7 |
| 9 | 1 | (Macau) Eurico de Jesus | MacPro Racing Team | Honda Civic Type R TCR (FK8) | 7 | +12.086 | 10 | |
| 10 | 93 | (Macau) Ryan Wong | MacPro Racing Team | Honda Civic Type R TCR (FK8) | 7 | +16.877 | 14 | |
| 11 | 3 | (China) Yang Xi | Champ Motorsport | Audi RS 3 LMS TCR | 7 | +18.859 | 12 | 6 |
| 12 | 23 | (China) Zhang Han Biao | Zhang Han Biao | Audi RS 3 LMS TCR | 7 | +19.645 | 13 | |
| 13 | 5 | (China) Yifan Wu | Xinjun 326 Racing Team | Audi RS 3 LMS TCR | 7 | +20.685 | 20 | 5 |
| 14 | 16 | (Hong Kong) Kenneth Look | Elegant Racing Team | CUPRA León TCR | 7 | +22.537 | 24 | 4 |
| 15 | 45 | (Hong Kong) Lung Yiu | Endless Sports | Alfa Romeo Giulietta TCR | 7 | +24.848 | 15 | |
| 16 | 61 | (China) Qi Lin | AHRT Autohome Racing Team | Lynk & Co 03 TCR | 7 | +25.265 | 19 | 3 |
| 17 | 21 | (Hong Kong) Ivan Szeto | Maximum Racing | Honda Civic Type R TCR (FK2) | 7 | +25.535 | 21 | |
| 18 | 7 | (China) Yan Chuang | Fancy Aspect | Volkswagen Golf GTI TCR | 7 | +30.026 | 17 | 2 |
| 19 | 81 | (China) Huang Chu Han | Team NewFaster | Audi RS 3 LMS TCR | 7 | +41.008 | 33 | 1 |
| 20 | 8 | (Macau) Wong Kiang Kuan | Elegant Racing Team | CUPRA León TCR | 7 | +48.266^{1} | 23 | |
| 21 | 2 | (China) Wo Wen Fa | TPR | Audi RS 3 LMS TCR | 7 | +48.705 | 25 | |
| 22 | 99 | (China) Wei Hang He | Falcon Racing Team | Volkswagen Golf GTI TCR | 7 | +49.443 | 32 | |
| 23 | 33 | (Hong Kong) Michael Wong | Z.Speed Racing | Audi RS 3 LMS TCR | 7 | +51.656 | 26 | |
| 24 | 77 | (China) Sun Jun Long | Team NewFaster | Audi RS 3 LMS TCR | 7 | +52.344 | 29 | |
| 25 | 66 | (Macau) Kin Veng Ng | Sony Kinetic Energy Team | Audi RS 3 LMS TCR | 7 | +1:24.684 | 31 | |
| 26 | 6 | (China) Zou Baolong | Team NewFaster | Audi RS 3 LMS TCR | 7 | +2:49.297 | 18 | |
| 27 | 35 | (Macau) Kevin Lam Ka Chun | T. A. Motorsport | Volkswagen Golf GTI TCR | 6 | +1 Lap | 27 | |
| Ret | 51 | (Hong Kong) Henry Lee Jr. | Team Newfaster | Audi RS 3 LMS TCR | 4 | Accident | 6 | |
| Ret | 9 | (Macau) Rodolfo Ávila | Team MG XPower | MG 6 X-Power TCR | 4 | Accident | 5 | |
| Ret | 68 | (Hong Kong) James Tang | TRC | Honda Civic Type R TCR (FK8) | 4 | Accident | 11 | |
| Ret | 19 | (China) Heng Hu | Shaanxi Tianshi Racing Team | Audi RS 3 LMS TCR | 0 | Accident | 22 | |
| Ret | 12 | (Hong Kong) Wong Chin Hung | TRC | Honda Civic Type R TCR (FK2) | 0 | Accident | 28 | |
| Ret | 53 | (Hong Kong) Ng Chi Leung | Giti Tire Motorsport By Champ Motorsport | Volkswagen Golf GTI TCR | 0 | Accident | 30 | |

- **Bold** denotes fastest lap.
- Only TCR China-entered cars are eligible for points.
- **^1** Wong Kiang Kuan finished eleventh but was given a 30-second time penalty.

=== Main Race ===
| Pos. | No. | Name | Team | Car | Laps | Time/Retired | Grid | Points |
|---|---|---|---|---|---|---|---|---|
| 1 | 36 | (China) Jason Zhang | Shell Teamwork Lynk & Co Motorsport | Lynk & Co 03 TCR | 6 | 01:05:17.624 | 4 | 9 |
| 2 | 29 | (Hong Kong) Sunny Wong | Shell Teamwork Lynk & Co Motorsport | Lynk & Co 03 TCR | 6 | +3.044 | 5 | 7.5 |
| 3 | 28 | (Hong Kong) Lo Sze Ho | Maximum Racing | Honda Civic Type R TCR (FK2) | 6 | +3.517 | 6 | |
| 4 | 26 | (Macau) Filipe de Souza | T. A. Motorsport | Audi RS 3 LMS TCR | 6 | +4.529 | 3 | |
| 5 | 18 | (China) Zhendong Zhang | Team MG XPower | MG 6 X-Power TCR | 6 | +8.754 | 8 | 6.5 |
| 6 | 1 | (Macau) Eurico de Jesus | MacPro Racing Team | Honda Civic Type R TCR (FK8) | 7 | +6.100 | 9 | |
| 7 | 9 | (Macau) Rodolfo Ávila | Team MG XPower | MG 6 X-Power TCR | 6 | +7.190 | 29 | 5.5 |
| 8 | 81 | (China) Huang Chu Han | Team NewFaster | Audi RS 3 LMS TCR | 7 | +8.272 | 19 | 4.5 |
| 9 | 45 | (Hong Kong) Lung Yiu | Endless Sports | Alfa Romeo Giulietta TCR | 7 | +8.925 | 15 | |
| 10 | 68 | (Hong Kong) James Tang | TRC | Honda Civic Type R TCR (FK8) | 6 | +9.423 | 30 | |
| 11 | 8 | (Macau) Wong Kiang Kuan | Elegant Racing Team | CUPRA León TCR | 6 | +10.866 | 20 | |
| 12 | 6 | (China) Zou Baolong | Team NewFaster | Audi RS 3 LMS TCR | 6 | +12.054 | 26 | 3.5 |
| 13 | 33 | (Hong Kong) Michael Wong | Z.Speed Racing | Audi RS 3 LMS TCR | 6 | +13.917 | 23 | |
| 14 | 51 | (Hong Kong) Henry Lee Jr. | Team Newfaster | Audi RS 3 LMS TCR | 6 | +15.837 | 28 | |
| 15 | 2 | (China) Wo Wen Fa | TPR | Audi RS 3 LMS TCR | 6 | +19.331 | 21 | |
| 16 | 66 | (Macau) Kin Veng Ng | Sony Kinetic Energy Team | Audi RS 3 LMS TCR | 6 | +20.571 | 25 | |
| 17 | 23 | (China) Zhang Han Biao | Zhang Han Biao | Audi RS 3 LMS TCR | 6 | +21.316 | 12 | |
| 18 | 21 | (Hong Kong) Ivan Szeto | Maximum Racing | Honda Civic Type R TCR (FK2) | 6 | +22.068 | 17 | |
| 19 | 61 | (China) Qi Lin | AHRT Autohome Racing Team | Lynk & Co 03 TCR | 6 | +23.852 | 16 | 3 |
| 20 | 7 | (China) Yan Chuang | Fancy Aspect | Volkswagen Golf GTI TCR | 6 | +25.169 | 18 | 2.5 |
| 21 | 99 | (China) Wei Hang He | Falcon Racing Team | Volkswagen Golf GTI TCR | 6 | +26.134 | 22 | |
| 22 | 19 | (China) Heng Hu | Shaanxi Tianshi Racing Team | Audi RS 3 LMS TCR | 6 | +27.703 | 31 | |
| 23 | **10** | **(United Kingdom) Robert Huff** | **Team MG XPower** | **MG 6 X-Power TCR** | **6** | **+29.154**^{2} | **1** | **2** |
| 24 | 16 | (Hong Kong) Kenneth Look | Elegant Racing Team | CUPRA León TCR | 6 | +29.260 | 14 | 1.5 |
| 25 | 22 | (Hong Kong) Andy Yan | Team MG XPower | MG 6 X-Power TCR | 6 | +31.166^{3} | 7 | 1 |
| 26 | 77 | (China) Sun Jun Long | Team NewFaster | Audi RS 3 LMS TCR | 6 | +47.806^{4} | 24 | |
| Ret | 3 | (China) Yang Xi | Champ Motorsport | Audi RS 3 LMS TCR | 4 | Accident | 11 | |
| Ret | 5 | (China) Yifan Wu | Xinjun 326 Racing Team | Audi RS 3 LMS TCR | 4 | Accident | 13 | |
| Ret | 93 | (Macau) Ryan Wong | MacPro Racing Team | Honda Civic Type R TCR (FK8) | 3 | Accident | 10 | |
| Ret | 55 | (China) Ma Qing Hua | Shell Teamwork Lynk & Co Motorsport | Lynk & Co 03 TCR | 1 | Accident | 2 | |
| Ret | 35 | (Macau) Kevin Lam Ka Chun | T. A. Motorsport | Volkswagen Golf GTI TCR | 0 | Accident | 27 | |
| DNS | 12 | (Hong Kong) Wong Chin Hung | TRC | Honda Civic Type R TCR (FK2) | 0 | Did Not Start | — | |
| DNS | 53 | (Hong Kong) Ng Chi Leung | Giti Tire Motorsport By Champ Motorsport | Volkswagen Golf GTI TCR | 0 | Did Not Start | — | |

- **Bold** denotes fastest lap.
- Only TCR China-entered cars are eligible for points.
- **^2** Robert Huff finished 1st but was given a 30-second penalty for contact with Ma Qing Hua.
- **^3** Andy Yan finished 3rd but was given a 30-second penalty for overtaking Sunny Wong under yellow flag conditions.
- **^4** Sun Jun Long finished 15th but was given a 30-second penalty.
