= 2021 Macau Guia Race =

Race details
Date	19–21 November 2021
Official name	Macau Guia Race
Location	Circuito da Guia, Macau Peninsula, Macau
Course	Temporary street circuit 6.12 km (3.80 mi)
- Supporting
Distance	Race 1; 8 laps, 40.216 km (24.989 mi); Race 2; 12 laps, 40.216 km (24.989 mi)
- Race 1

Pole
Driver	(China) Ma Qing Hua	(China) Shell Teamwork Lynk & Co Motorsport
Time	2:31.545

Fastest lap
Driver	TBA	TBA
Time	TBA

Podium
First	(China) Ma Qing Hua	(China) Shell Teamwork Lynk & Co Motorsport
Second	(China) Jason Zhang	(China) Shell Teamwork Lynk & Co Motorsport
Third	(Hong Kong) Lo Sze Ho	(China) Z-Challenger Racing
- Race 2

Fastest lap
Driver	TBA	TBA
Time	TBA

Podium
First	(China) Jason Zhang	(China) Shell Teamwork Lynk & Co Motorsport
Second	(China) Ma Qing Hua	(China) Shell Teamwork Lynk & Co Motorsport
Third	(China) Yang Xiao Wei	Seat León TCR

The 2021 Galaxy Entertainment Macau Guia Race was the Sixth edition of the Macau Guia Race under the TCR Regulations held at Guia Circuit in Macau on 19–21 November 2021. The race was contested with TCR touring cars and run in support of the 2021 edition of the Macau Grand Prix. The race also served as the final round of the 2021 TCR Asia Series.

== Teams and drivers ==
The following teams and drivers are entered into the event:

Entrant	Car	No.	Driver
(Hong Kong) Team TRC	Honda Civic Type R TCR (FK8)	2	(Hong Kong) Andy Yan
(Macau) MacPro Racing Team	Honda Civic Type R TCR (FK8)	5	(Hong Kong) Wu Wai Hung
(Chinese Taipei) Z.Speed Racing	Volkswagen Golf GTI TCR	6	(Hong Kong) Tan Tzer Szen
(Macau) Elegant Racing Team	CUPRA León TCR	8	(Macau) Wong Kiang Kuan
(China) TPR Racing	Audi RS 3 LMS TCR	9	(China) Ye Guang Wen
(United Kingdom) HuffSport TM	Audi RS 3 LMS TCR	10	(China) Kai Tian
(China) Xinjun 326 Racing Team	Audi RS 3 LMS TCR	11	(China) Liu Zi Chen
(China) Shell Teamwork Lynk & Co Motorsport	Lynk & Co 03 TCR	12	(Hong Kong) Sunny Wong
(China) Z-Challenger Racing	Honda Civic Type R TCR (FK2)	13	(Hong Kong) Mok Tsz Wang
(Chinese Taipei) Z.Speed Racing	Seat León TCR	17	(China) Yang Xiao Wei
(China) Leo 109 Racing	Audi RS 3 LMS TCR	19	(China) Deng Bao Wei
(China) TPR Racing	Audi RS 3 LMS TCR	22	(China) Wo Wen Fa
(Macau) Sonic Racing Team	Audi RS 3 LMS TCR	26	(Macau) Filipe de Souza
(China) Z-Challenger Racing	Honda Civic Type R TCR (FK2)	27	(Hong Kong) Jactin Chung Ho Hin
(China) Z-Challenger Racing	Hyundai i30 N TCR	28	(Hong Kong) Lo Sze Ho
(China) Shell Teamwork Lynk & Co Motorsport	Lynk & Co 03 TCR	33	(China) Ma Qing Hua
(China) Shell Teamwork Lynk & Co Motorsport	Lynk & Co 03 TCR	36	(China) Jason Zhang
(Macau) Son Veng Racing Team	Volkswagen Golf GTI TCR	42	(Macau) Weng Tong Chan
(Japan) Endless Sports	Alfa Romeo Giulietta TCR	45	(Hong Kong) Lung Yiu
(China) Xinjun 326 Racing Team	Audi RS 3 LMS TCR	51	(China) Yifan Wu
(China) TPR Racing	Audi RS 3 LMS TCR	63	(Hong Kong) Henry Lee Jr.
(China) Audi Sport Team NewFaster	Audi RS 3 LMS TCR	66	(China) Zou Baolong
(China) Fancy Team	Volkswagen Golf GTI TCR	67	(China) Yan Chuang
(Hong Kong) Team TRC	Honda Civic Type R TCR (FK8)	68	(Hong Kong) James Tang
(Chinese Taipei) Z.Speed Racing	Audi RS 3 LMS TCR	76	(China) LIU Qi
(China) Audi Sport Team NewFaster	Audi RS 3 LMS TCR	81	(China) Huang Chu Han
