= 2020 TCR China Touring Car Championship =

The 2020 TCR China season was the fourth season of the TCR's Chinese Touring Car Championship.

== Teams and drivers ==
Team	Car	No.	Drivers	Class	Rounds	Ref.
(China) Xinjun 326 Racing Team	Audi RS 3 LMS TCR	5	(China) Yifan Wu	Am	6	
(China) Xinjun 326 Racing Team	Audi RS 3 LMS TCR	51	(China) Yifan Wu	Am	1−5	
(China) Team MG XPower	MG 6 X-Power TCR	6	(China) Yue Cui		1−2	
(China) Team MG XPower	MG 6 X-Power TCR	8	(China) Sun Chao		3−5	
(China) Team MG XPower	MG 6 X-Power TCR	9	(Macau) Rodolfo Ávila		6	
(China) Team MG XPower	MG 6 X-Power TCR	20	(Macau) Rodolfo Ávila		1−5	
(China) Team MG XPower	MG 6 X-Power TCR	10	(United Kingdom) Rob Huff		6	
(China) Team MG XPower	MG 6 X-Power TCR	18	(China) Zhendong Zhang		All	
(China) Team MG XPower	MG 6 X-Power TCR	22	(China) Xiaole He		1−5	
(China) Team MG XPower	MG 6 X-Power TCR	22	(Hong Kong) Andy Yan		6	
(China) Team NewFaster	Audi RS 3 LMS TCR	6	(China) Zou Baolong	Am	6	
(China) Team NewFaster	Audi RS 3 LMS TCR	81	(China) Huang Chu Han	Am	6	
(China) Fancy Aspect	Volkswagen Golf GTI TCR	7	(China) Yan Chuang	Am	6	
(China) Fancy Aspect	Volkswagen Golf GTI TCR	77	(China) Yan Chuang	Am	1−5	
(Macau) Elegant Racing Team	CUPRA León TCR	16	(Hong Kong) Kenneth Look	Am	3, 6	
(China) T. A. Motorsport	Audi RS 3 LMS TCR	26	(Macau) Filipe de Souza	Am	3−6	
(China) Champ Motorsport	Audi RS 3 LMS TCR	3	(China) Yang Xi	Am	6	
(China) Champ Motorsport	Audi RS 3 LMS TCR	333	(China) Yang Xi	Am	1−2	
(Hong Kong) Shell Teamwork Lynk & Co Motorsport	Lynk & Co 03 TCR	333	(China) Yang Xi	Am	3−5	
(Hong Kong) Shell Teamwork Lynk & Co Motorsport	Lynk & Co 03 TCR	29	(Hong Kong) Sunny Wong		6	
(Hong Kong) Shell Teamwork Lynk & Co Motorsport	Lynk & Co 03 TCR	36	(China) Jason Zhang		6	
(Hong Kong) Shell Teamwork Lynk & Co Motorsport	Lynk & Co 03 TCR	55	(China) Ma Qing Hua		All	
(Hong Kong) Shell Teamwork Lynk & Co Motorsport	Lynk & Co 03 TCR	312	(China) Lu Wei		1−2	
(China) AHRT Autohome Racing Team	Lynk & Co 03 TCR	61	(China) Qi Lin	Am	6	
(China) AHRT Autohome Racing Team	Lynk & Co 03 TCR	818	(China) Qi Lin	Am	1−2	
(China) AHRT Autohome Racing Team	Lynk & Co 03 TCR	601	(China) Wang Tao	Am	3, 5	
(China) AHRT Autohome Racing Team	Lynk & Co 03 TCR	818	(China) Ziyi Zhang	Am	1−2, 4	
(China) PCT Racing	Alfa Romeo Giulietta TCR	66	(China) Zhang Hanbiao	Am	3	
Macau Guia Race entries that were ineligible to score points
(Macau) MacPro Racing Team	Honda Civic Type R TCR (FK8)	1	(Macau) Eurico de Jesus		6	
(Macau) MacPro Racing Team	Honda Civic Type R TCR (FK8)	93	(Macau) Ryan Wong		6	
(China) TPR	Audi RS 3 LMS TCR	2	(China) Wo Wen Fa		6	
(China) Team NewFaster	Audi RS 3 LMS TCR	51	(Hong Kong) Henry Lee Jr.		6	
(China) Team NewFaster	Audi RS 3 LMS TCR	77	(China) Sun Jun Long		6	
(Macau) Elegant Racing Team	CUPRA León TCR	8	(Macau) Wong Kiang Kuan		6	
(Hong Kong) TRC	Honda Civic Type R TCR (FK2)	12	(Hong Kong) Wong Chin Hung		6	
(Hong Kong) TRC	Honda Civic Type R TCR (FK8)	68	(Hong Kong) James Tang		6	
(China) Shaanxi Tianshi Racing Team	Audi RS 3 LMS TCR	19	(China) Heng Hu		6	
(Hong Kong) Maximum Racing	Honda Civic Type R TCR (FK2)	21	(Hong Kong) Ivan Szeto		6	
(Hong Kong) Maximum Racing	Honda Civic Type R TCR (FK2)	28	(Hong Kong) Lo Sze Ho		6	
(China) Zhang Han Biao	Audi RS 3 LMS TCR	23	(China) Zhang Han Biao		6	
(Taiwan) Z.Speed Racing	Audi RS 3 LMS TCR	33	(Hong Kong) Michael Wong		6	
(China) T. A. Motorsport	Volkswagen Golf GTI TCR	35	(Macau) Kevin Lam Ka Chun		6	
(China) Giti Tire Motorsport By Champ Motorsport	Volkswagen Golf GTI TCR	53	(Macau) Chi Leung Ng		6	
(Japan) Endless Sports	Alfa Romeo Giulietta TCR	45	(Hong Kong) Lung Yiu		6	
(China) Sony Kinetic Energy Team	Audi RS 3 LMS TCR	66	(Macau) Kin Veng Ng		6	
(China) Falcon Racing Team	Volkswagen Golf GTI TCR	99	(China) Wei Hang He		6	

== Calendar and results ==
The revised calendar was announced on 21 July 2020. Another revised calendar for the following rounds was announced on 20 October 2020.

Rnd.		Circuit	Date	Pole position	Fastest lap	Winning driver	Winning team	Am Cup winner	Supporting
1	1	Zhuzhou International Circuit	8 August	(China) Ma Qing Hua	(China) Ma Qing Hua	(China) Ma Qing Hua	(Hong Kong) Shell Teamwork Lynk & Co Motorsport	(China) Yang Xi	TCR Asia North Series; China Touring Car Championship
1	2	Zhuzhou International Circuit	8 August		(China) Ma Qing Hua	(China) Ma Qing Hua	(Hong Kong) Shell Teamwork Lynk & Co Motorsport	(China) Yifan Wu	TCR Asia North Series; China Touring Car Championship
2	3	Zhuzhou International Circuit	9 August	(China) Yang Xi	(China) Ma Qing Hua	(China) Ma Qing Hua	(Hong Kong) Shell Teamwork Lynk & Co Motorsport	(China) Yang Xi	TCR Asia North Series; China Touring Car Championship
2	4	Zhuzhou International Circuit	9 August		(China) Ma Qing Hua	(China) Lu Wei	(Hong Kong) Shell Teamwork Lynk & Co Motorsport	(China) Yifan Wu	TCR Asia North Series; China Touring Car Championship
3	5	Shanghai Tianma Circuit	24−25 October	(Macau) Rodolfo Ávila	(China) Ma Qing Hua	(China) Ma Qing Hua	(Hong Kong) Shell Teamwork Lynk & Co Motorsport	(China) Wang Tao	
3	6	Shanghai Tianma Circuit	24−25 October		(Macau) Rodolfo Ávila	(Macau) Rodolfo Ávila	(China) Team MG XPower	(China) Wang Tao	
4	7	Jiangsu Wantrack International Circuit	30−31 October	(China) Xiaole He	(China) Xiaole He	(China) Xiaole He	(China) Team MG XPower	(China) Yang Xi	
4	8	Jiangsu Wantrack International Circuit	30−31 October		(Macau) Rodolfo Ávila	(Macau) Rodolfo Ávila	(China) Team MG XPower	(Macau) Filipe de Souza	
5	9	Jiangsu Wantrack International Circuit	1 November	(China) Xiaole He	(Macau) Rodolfo Ávila	(China) Zhendong Zhang	(China) Team MG XPower	(China) Wang Tao	
5	10	Jiangsu Wantrack International Circuit	1 November		(China) Ma Qing Hua	(China) Sun Chao	(China) Team MG XPower	(China) Wang Tao	
6	11	Guia Circuit	19−22 November	(United Kingdom) Robert Huff	(United Kingdom) Robert Huff	(United Kingdom) Robert Huff	(China) Team MG XPower	(China) Yang Xi	Macau Guia Race
6	12	Guia Circuit	19−22 November		(United Kingdom) Robert Huff	(China) Jason Zhang	(Hong Kong) Shell Teamwork Lynk & Co Motorsport	(China) Huang Chu Han	Macau Guia Race

== Championship standings ==
=== Drivers' championship ===
Scoring systems

1st	2nd	3rd	4th	5th	6th	7th	8th	9th	10th	11th	12th	PP	FL
18	15	13	11	9	7	6	5	4	3	2	1	**0**	0

Pos.	Driver	ZHZ1 (China)		ZHZ2 (China)		TIA (China)		JIA1 (China)		JIA2 (China)		MAC (Macau)		Pts.
Pos.	Driver	RD1	RD2	RD1	RD2	RD1	RD2	RD1	RD2	RD1	RD2	RD1	RD2	Pts.
1	(China) Ma Qing Hua	**1**	1	1	2	1	2	2	4	Ret	5	2	Ret	154
2	(Macau) Rodolfo Ávila	3	2	3	3	**Ret**	1	3	1	3	2	Ret	7	131
3	(China) Zhendong Zhang	DNS	DNS	DNS	DNS	2	4	4	2	1	6	8	5	90.5
4	(China) Xiaole He	6	6	Ret	DNS	4	3	**1**	5	**4**	4			89
5	(China) Yifan Wu	8	4	6	4	5	8	8	8	8	8	13	Ret	73
6	(China) Sun Chao					6	7	5	3	6	1			54
7	(China) Wang Tao					3	5			2	3			50
8	(China) Yue Cui	5	3	5	5									40
9	(China) Lu Wei	2	Ret	7	1									39
10	(China) Qi Lin		7	4								16	19	23
11	(China) Jason Zhang											4	1	22
12	(China) Yan Chuang	DNS	DNS	DNS	DNS	Ret	9	7	Ret	7	DNS	18	20	20.5
13	(United Kingdom) Robert Huff											**1**	23	20
14	(Hong Kong) Sunny Wong											5	2	18.5
15	(China) Ziyi Zhang	7			6			Ret	9					17
16	(Hong Kong) Kenneth Look					7	10					14	24	14.5
17	(Macau) Filipe de Souza					Ret	Ret	9	6	DNS	DNS	3	4	13
18	(Hong Kong) Andy Yan											7	25	10
19	(China) Zhang Hanbiao					8	11					12	17	7
20	(China) Yang Xi	4	5	**2**	7	Ret	6	6	7	5	7	11	Ret	6
21	(China) Huang Chu Han											19	8	5.5
22	(China) Zou Baolong											26	12	3.5
Pos.	Driver	ZHZ1 (China)		ZHZ2 (China)		TIA (China)		JIA1 (China)		JIA2 (China)		MAC (Macau)		Pts.

Colour	Result
Gold	Winner
Silver	Second place
Bronze	Third place
Green	Points classification
Blue	Non-points classification
Blue	Non-classified finish (NC)
Purple	Retired, not classified (Ret)
Red	Did not qualify (DNQ)
Red	Did not pre-qualify (DNPQ)
Black	Disqualified (DSQ)
White	Did not start (DNS)
White	Withdrew (WD)
White	Race cancelled (C)
Blank	Did not practice (DNP)
Blank	Did not arrive (DNA)
Blank	Excluded (EX)

**Bold** – Pole
Italics – Fastest Lap

=== Teams' championship ===
Pos.	Team	ZHZ1 (China)		ZHZ2 (China)		TIA (China)		JIA1 (China)		JIA2 (China)		MAC (Macau)		Pts.
Pos.	Team	RD1	RD2	RD1	RD2	RD1	RD2	RD1	RD2	RD1	RD2	RD1	RD2	Pts.
1	(China) Team MG XPower	3	2	3	3	2	1	**1**	1	1	1	**1**	5	279
1	(China) Team MG XPower	5	3	5	5	4	3	3	2	3	2	7	7	279
2	(Hong Kong) Shell Teamwork Lynk & Co Motorsport	**1**	1	1	1	1	2	2	4	5	5	2	1	213
2	(Hong Kong) Shell Teamwork Lynk & Co Motorsport	2	Ret	7	2	Ret	6	6	7	Ret	7	4	2	213
3	(China) Carhouse Autohome Racing Team	7	7	4	6	3	5	Ret	9	2	3			84
4	(China) Xinjun 326 Racing Team	8	4	6	4	5	6	8	8	8	8	13	Ret	68
5	(China) Champ Motorsport	4	5	**2**	7							11	Ret	41
6	(China) Fancy Aspect	DNS	DNS	DNS	DNS	Ret	9	7	Ret	7	DNS	18	20	16
7	(China) T. A. Motorsport					Ret	Ret	9	6	DNS	DNS	3	4	13
8	(Macau) Elegant Racing Team					7	10					14	24	9
9	(China) PCT Racing					8	11							7
	(China) AHRT Autohome Racing Team											16	19	
	(China) Zhang Hanbiao Racing											12	17	
	(China) Team NewFaster											19	8	
	(China) Team NewFaster											26	12	
Pos.	Team	ZHZ1 (China)		ZHZ2 (China)		SHA (China)		JIA1 (China)		JIA2 (China)		MAC (Macau)		Pts.

=== Am Cup ===
Pos.	Team	ZHZ1 (China)		ZHZ2 (China)		SHA (China)		JIA1 (China)		JIA2 (China)		MAC (Macau)		Pts.
Pos.	Team	RD1	RD2	RD1	RD2	RD1	RD2	RD1	RD2	RD1	RD2	RD1	RD2	Pts.
1	(China) Yang Xi	4	5	2	7	Ret	6	6	7	5	7	11	Ret	76
2	(China) Yifan Wu	8	4	6	4	5	8	8	8	8	8	13	Ret	68
3	(China) Wang Tao					3	5			2	3			50
4	(China) Qi Lin		7	4								16	19	17
5	(China) Ziyi Zhang	7			6			Ret	9					17
6	(China) Yan Chuang	DNS	DNS	DNS	DNS	Ret	9	7	Ret	7	DNS	18	20	16
7	(Macau) Filipe de Souza					Ret	Ret	9	6	DNS	DNS	3	4	13
8	(Hong Kong) Kenneth Look					7	10					14	24	9
9	(China) Zhang Hanbiao					8	11					12	17	7
Pos.	Driver	ZHZ1 (China)		ZHZ2 (China)		TIA (China)		JIA1 (China)		JIA2 (China)		MAC (Macau)		Pts.
