= 2012 Guia Race of Macau =

Race details
- Round 12 of 12 in the 2012 World Touring Car Championship at Guia Circuit in Macau.
- Date: 18 November, 2012
- Location: Macau
- Course: Guia Circuit; 6.120 kilometres (3.803 mi)

Race One
- Laps: 9
Pole position
Driver		(United Kingdom) Robert Huff	Chevrolet
Time		2:29.422	
Podium
First		(France) Yvan Muller	Chevrolet
Second		(Switzerland) Alain Menu	Chevrolet
Third		(Portugal) Tiago Monteiro	Honda Racing Team JAS
Fastest Lap
Driver		(Switzerland) Alain Menu	Chevrolet
Time		2:32.063	

Race Two
- Laps: 9
Podium
First		(Switzerland) Alain Menu	Chevrolet
Second		(United Kingdom) Robert Huff	Chevrolet
Third		(France) Yvan Muller	Chevrolet
Fastest Lap
Driver		(United Kingdom) Robert Huff	Chevrolet
Time		2:32.422	

The 2012 Guia Race of Macau was the twelfth and final round of the 2012 World Touring Car Championship season and the eighth running of the Guia Race of Macau. It was held on 18 November 2012 at the Guia Circuit in the Chinese special administrative region of Macau. The race was part of the Macau Grand Prix weekend, headlined by the Formula Three event. Both races were won by Chevrolet in their final event as a works team; Yvan Muller won the first race and Alain Menu won the second race, while the team's third driver Robert Huff became series champion with second to Menu in the second race.

== Background ==
At the previous round in the Race of China, Robert Huff had established himself as the solo championship leader. Norbert Michelisz was leading the Yokohama Independents' Trophy.

A number of local drivers joined the field for the race, Jo Merszei joined Liqui Moly Team Engstler in a naturally aspirated BMW 320si previously run in 2012 by Masaki Kano and Alex Liu. Andre Couto joined Tuenti Racing Team for his annual appearance at Macau. China Dragon Racing added a second Chevrolet Lacetti for Celio Alves Dias. RPM Racing Team ran a BMW 320si for Mak Ka Lok while Five Auto Racing Team ran a BMW 320si for Henry Ho and a Honda Accord Euro R for Eurico de Jesus. Italian former All-Japan Formula Three driver Kei Cozzolino made his maiden touring car appearance, replacing Alberto Cerqui at ROAL Motorsport.

This was to be the last race for Chevrolet as a works team in the WTCC having announced their departure from the series in July.

== Report ==
=== Free Practice ===
Tiago Monteiro set the pace in the shortened Thursday test session, with Mehdi Bennani and Stefano D'Aste have initially set the pace. Cozzolino, Mak Ka Lok and Franz Engstler recovered from spins with relatively little damage, the session was however red flagged three minutes from the end when bamboo-engineering driver Darryl O'Young crashed head on into the barrier at the Mandarin Oriental corner.

Huff went quickest in Free Practice 1 on Friday, having spent much of the session trading times with teammates Muller and Menu and Honda Racing Team JAS driver Monteiro. O'Young was able to participate after his car was repaired overnight, Cozzolino damaged his car colliding with a barrier and Henry Ho was once again unable to run, this time due to a gearbox failure.

Huff led the Chevrolet trio in the second free practice session which distanced itself from the next nearest challenger, the Lukoil Racing SEAT León of Gabriele Tarquini, by 1.3 seconds. Damage sustained in the first free practice session meant Cozzolino did not get any running in for ROAL Motorsport, while Bennani and D'Aste had two separate near misses with the barriers.

=== Qualifying ===
Having led free practice, Huff dominated qualifying to claim his fourth pole position at Macau and extend his championship lead. He set a new lap record for the circuit in doing so, beating the record previously held by teammate Menu. Muller was second and Menu was third, with Tarquini fourth and Monteiro fifth in the new Honda Civic. O'Young took the independents' pole position with sixth place just ahead of Yokohama Trophy challengers Michelisz and Pepe Oriola. Fellow trophy challenger D'Aste could only manage 11th, setting a slightly slower time in Q2 than in Q1. Fredy Barth brought out the red flags when he crashed at Police bend, the stoppage hampering Tom Coronel's effort to progress to Q2. Six drivers set times slower than the 107% time in Q1, three of which had their times removed as a penalty for not reporting to the weighing bay. They were given permission to start the races from the back of the grid.

=== Warm-Up ===
Pole sitter Huff led the Sunday morning warm up session with Monteiro continuing to show potential in second and championship outsider Muller third. An off at the Melco hairpin for Barth brought out the yellow flags late in the otherwise undisturbed session.

=== Race One ===
Huff started on pole position but it was Muller who grabbed the lead for the first three laps while Monteiro grabbed fourth from Tarquini. A crash at Lisboa further down the field on the opening lap involving the Yokohama Trophy contenders block the track briefly, the leading six cars built a gap to the rest of the field after this. D'Aste was able to resume but was later issued with a black and orange flag due to the damage sustained in the accident. A move by Huff at Lisboa to take the lead demoted Muller to second on lap three for a short time before the race leader collided with a barrier and broke his suspension, promoting Muller back into the lead. Muller led the rest of the race to claim his ninth victory of the season ahead of Menu and Monteiro on his first podium appearance for Honda. O'Young finished as the independent winner having started from the class pole.

=== Race Two ===
Bamboo driver Alex MacDowall started from pole position on the reversed grid but a quick start by Michelisz soon put the Zengő Motorsport driver into the lead of the race. Menu made good progress from eighth and was soon up to fourth place behind Oriola, he got by the Tuenti Racing driver on the second lap. MacDowall reclaimed the lead from Michelisz but both drivers were easy targets for Menu who assumed the lead. MacDowall dropped to fourth where he remained until contact from Muller spun him into the barrier on the exit of the high speed Mandarin bend, Huff then took fourth off Muller. A long safety car period followed as work started to clear the debris from the collision, the race distance was extended and the action resumed on lap 8. Oriola out-braked himself going into Lisboa in a bid to pass Michelisz, putting them both in the barrier and bringing out the safety car for the second and final time. The race ended under the safety car with Chevrolet claiming a dominant 1–2–3 finish with Menu leading Huff and Muller. Huff secured his first World Touring Car Championship crown and Michelisz won the Yokohama Independents' Trophy despite not finishing the race.

== Results ==
=== Qualifying ===
Pos.	No.	Name	Team	Car	C	Q1	Q2	Points
1	2	(United Kingdom) Robert Huff	Chevrolet	Chevrolet Cruze 1.6T		2:30.903	2:29.422	**5**
2	1	(France) Yvan Muller	Chevrolet	Chevrolet Cruze 1.6T		2:30.950	2:30.144	**4**
3	8	(Switzerland) Alain Menu	Chevrolet	Chevrolet Cruze 1.6T		2:31.490	2:30.488	**3**
4	3	(Italy) Gabriele Tarquini	Lukoil Racing	SEAT León WTCC		2:31.868	2:30.936	**2**
5	18	(Portugal) Tiago Monteiro	Honda Racing Team JAS	Honda Civic S2000 TC		2:31.366	2:31.539	**1**
6	20	(China) Darryl O'Young	bamboo-engineering	Chevrolet Cruze 1.6T	Y	2:32.066	2:31.643	
7	5	(Hungary) Norbert Michelisz	Zengő Motorsport	BMW 320 TC	Y	2:32.458	2:31.670	
8	25	(Morocco) Mehdi Bennani	Proteam Racing	BMW 320 TC	Y	2:32.989	2:32.157	
9	74	(Spain) Pepe Oriola	Tuenti Racing	SEAT León WTCC	Y	2:32.907	2:32.475	
10	11	(United Kingdom) **Alex MacDowall**	bamboo-engineering	Chevrolet Cruze 1.6T	Y	2:32.762	2:32.521	
11	26	(Italy) Stefano D'Aste	Wiechers-Sport	BMW 320 TC	Y	2:32.945	2:33.025	
12	6	(Germany) Franz Engstler	Liqui Moly Team Engstler	BMW 320 TC	Y	2:33.091	2:33.107	
13	15	(Netherlands) Tom Coronel	ROAL Motorsport	BMW 320 TC		2:33.181		
14	22	(United Kingdom) Tom Boardman	Special Tuning Racing	SEAT León WTCC	Y	2:33.270		
15	73	(Switzerland) Fredy Barth	SEAT Swiss Racing by SUNRED	SEAT León WTCC	Y	2:33.358		
16	14	(United Kingdom) James Nash	Team Aon	Ford Focus S2000 TC		2:34.792		
17	23	(United Kingdom) Tom Chilton	Team Aon	Ford Focus S2000 TC		2:34.969		
18	4	(Russia) Aleksei Dudukalo	Lukoil Racing	SEAT León WTCC	Y	2:35.025		
19	7	(Hong Kong) Charles Ng	Liqui Moly Team Engstler	BMW 320 TC	Y	2:35.180		
20	66	(Macau) Andre Couto	Tuenti Racing	SR León 1.6T		2:35.218		
21	88	(Spain) Fernando Monje	Tuenti Racing	SEAT León WTCC	Y	2:35.307		
22	46	(Italy) Kei Cozzolino	ROAL Motorsport	BMW 320 TC	Y	2:39.020		
23	77	(Macau) Jo Merszei	Liqui Moly Team Engstler	BMW 320si	Y	2:40.785		
107% time: 2:41.466
—	82	(Macau) Henry Ho	Five Auto Racing Team	BMW 320si	Y	2:42.170		
—	55	(Macau) Celio Alves Dias	China Dragon Racing	Chevrolet Lacetti	Y	2:43.630		
—	81	(Macau) Eurico de Jesus	Five Auto Racing Team	Honda Accord Euro R	Y	2:43.816		
—	50	(Macau) Felipe De Souza	China Dragon Racing	Chevrolet Lacetti	Y	no time set		
—	51	(Macau) Kin Veng Ng	China Dragon Racing	Chevrolet Cruze LT	Y	no time set		
—	78	(Macau) Mak Ka Lok	RPM Racing Team	BMW 320si	Y	no time set		

- **Bold** denotes Pole position for second race.

=== Race 1 ===
Pos.	No.	Name	Team	Car	C	Laps	Time/Retired	Grid	Points
1	1	(France) Yvan Muller	Chevrolet	Chevrolet Cruze 1.6T		9	23:08.977	2	25
2	8	(Switzerland) **Alain Menu**	Chevrolet	Chevrolet Cruze 1.6T		9	+0.915	3	18
3	18	(Portugal) Tiago Monteiro	Honda Racing Team JAS	Honda Civic S2000 TC		9	+1.297	5	15
4	3	(Italy) Gabriele Tarquini	Lukoil Racing	SEAT León WTCC		9	+1.967	4	12
5	20	(China) Darryl O'Young	bamboo-engineering	Chevrolet Cruze 1.6T	Y	9	+11.519	6	10
6	15	(Netherlands) Tom Coronel	ROAL Motorsport	BMW 320 TC		9	+55.136	13	8
7	6	(Germany) Franz Engstler	Liqui Moly Team Engstler	BMW 320 TC	Y	9	+1:04.037	12	6
8	73	(Switzerland) Fredy Barth	SEAT Swiss Racing by SUNRED	SEAT León WTCC	Y	9	+1:09.730	15	4
9	11	(United Kingdom) Alex MacDowall	bamboo-engineering	Chevrolet Cruze 1.6T	Y	9	+1:16.524	10	2
10	22	(United Kingdom) Tom Boardman	Special Tuning Racing	SEAT León WTCC	Y	9	+1:22.194	14	1
11	4	(Russia) Aleksei Dudukalo	Lukoil Racing	SEAT León WTCC	Y	9	+1:22.372	18	
12	14	(United Kingdom) James Nash	Team Aon	Ford Focus S2000 TC		9	+1:23.053	16	
13	23	(United Kingdom) Tom Chilton	Team Aon	Ford Focus S2000 TC		9	+1:25.822	17	
14	88	(Spain) Fernando Monje	Tuenti Racing	SEAT León WTCC	Y	9	+1:29.347	21	
15	66	(Macau) Andre Couto	Tuenti Racing	SR León 1.6T		9	+2:12.605	20	
16	82	(Macau) Henry Ho	Five Auto Racing Team	BMW 320si	Y	9	+2:19.429	24	
17	77	(Macau) Jo Merszei	Liqui Moly Team Engstler	BMW 320si	Y	9	+3:23.533	23	
18	50	(Macau) Felipe De Souza	China Dragon Racing	Chevrolet Lacetti	Y	7	+2 Laps	27	
19	55	(Macau) Celio Alves Dias	China Dragon Racing	Chevrolet Lacetti	Y	7	+2 Laps	25	
20	46	(Italy) Kei Cozzolino	ROAL Motorsport	BMW 320 TC	Y	7	Accident	22	
21	78	(Macau) Mak Ka Lok	RPM Racing Team	BMW 320si	Y	6	+3 Laps	29	
Ret	51	(Macau) Kin Veng Ng	China Dragon Racing	Chevrolet Cruze LT	Y	5	Suspension	28	
Ret	2	(United Kingdom) Robert Huff	Chevrolet	Chevrolet Cruze 1.6T		4	Accident damage	1	
Ret	7	(Hong Kong) Charles Ng	Liqui Moly Team Engstler	BMW 320 TC	Y	4	Accident	19	
NC	5	(Hungary) Norbert Michelisz	Zengő Motorsport	BMW 320 TC	Y	3	+6 Laps	7	
Ret	26	(Italy) Stefano D'Aste	Wiechers-Sport	BMW 320 TC	Y	2	Accident damage	11	
Ret	81	(Macau) Eurico de Jesus	Five Auto Racing Team	Honda Accord Euro R	Y	1	Accident damage	26	
Ret	74	(Spain) Pepe Oriola	Tuenti Racing	SEAT León WTCC	Y	0	Collision	9	
Ret	25	(Morocco) Mehdi Bennani	Proteam Racing	BMW 320 TC	Y	0	Collision	8	

- **Bold** denotes Fastest lap.

=== Race 2 ===
Pos.	No.	Name	Team	Car	C	Laps	Time/Retired	Grid	Points
1	8	(Switzerland) Alain Menu	Chevrolet	Chevrolet Cruze 1.6T		11	35:36.096	7	25
2	2	(United Kingdom) **Robert Huff**	Chevrolet	Chevrolet Cruze 1.6T		11	+0.320	9	18
3	1	(France) Yvan Muller	Chevrolet	Chevrolet Cruze 1.6T		11	+0.889	8	15
4	18	(Portugal) Tiago Monteiro	Honda Racing Team JAS	Honda Civic S2000 TC		11	+9.015	5	12
5	20	(China) Darryl O'Young	bamboo-engineering	Chevrolet Cruze 1.6T	Y	11	+9.786	4	10
6	6	(Germany) Franz Engstler	Liqui Moly Team Engstler	BMW 320 TC	Y	11	+10.127	11	8
7	4	(Russia) Aleksei Dudukalo	Lukoil Racing	SEAT León WTCC	Y	11	+11.024	18	6
8	73	(Switzerland) Fredy Barth	SEAT Swiss Racing by SUNRED	SEAT León WTCC	Y	11	+11.399	14	4
9	22	(United Kingdom) Tom Boardman	Special Tuning Racing	SEAT León WTCC	Y	11	+11.582	13	2
10	88	(Spain) Fernando Monje	Tuenti Racing	SEAT León WTCC	Y	11	+11.900	19	1
11	66	(Macau) Andre Couto	Tuenti Racing	SR León 1.6T		11	+12.412	18	
12	14	(United Kingdom) James Nash	Team Aon	Ford Focus S2000 TC		11	+20.496	15	
13	77	(Macau) Jo Merszei	Liqui Moly Team Engstler	BMW 320si	Y	11	+20.883	20	
14	50	(Macau) Felipe De Souza	China Dragon Racing	Chevrolet Lacetti	Y	11	+21.920	24	
15	55	(Macau) Celio Alves Dias	China Dragon Racing	Chevrolet Lacetti	Y	11	+22.760	22	
16	78	(Macau) Mak Ka Lok	RPM Racing Team	BMW 320si	Y	11	+24.741	26	
17	51	(Macau) Kin Veng Ng	China Dragon Racing	Chevrolet Cruze LT	Y	11	+25.589	25	
18	81	(Macau) Eurico de Jesus	Five Auto Racing Team	Honda Accord Euro R	Y	11	+26.243	23	
19	46	(Italy) Kei Cozzolino	ROAL Motorsport	BMW 320 TC	Y	9	+2 Laps	29	
20	3	(Italy) Gabriele Tarquini	Lukoil Racing	SEAT León WTCC		9	Floor	6	
21	5	(Hungary) Norbert Michelisz	Zengő Motorsport	BMW 320 TC	Y	8	Collision	3	
22	74	(Spain) Pepe Oriola	Tuenti Racing	SEAT León WTCC	Y	8	Collision	2	
23	26	(Italy) Stefano D'Aste	Wiechers-Sport	BMW 320 TC	Y	8	Accident	10	
Ret	15	(Netherlands) Tom Coronel	ROAL Motorsport	BMW 320 TC		4	Radiator	12	
Ret	11	(United Kingdom) Alex MacDowall	bamboo-engineering	Chevrolet Cruze 1.6T	Y	3	Collision	1	
Ret	23	(United Kingdom) Tom Chilton	Team Aon	Ford Focus S2000 TC		3	Collision	16	
Ret	25	(Morocco) Mehdi Bennani	Proteam Racing	BMW 320 TC	Y	3	Collision	27	
Ret	82	(Macau) Henry Ho	Five Auto Racing Team	BMW 320si	Y	1	Clutch	21	
DNS	7	(Hong Kong) Charles Ng	Liqui Moly Team Engstler	BMW 320 TC	Y	0	Accident damage	28	

- **Bold** denotes Fastest lap.

== Final championship standings ==
Drivers' Championship standings

Pos	Driver	Points
1	(United Kingdom) Robert Huff	413
2	(Switzerland) Alain Menu	401
3	(France) Yvan Muller	393
4	(Italy) Gabriele Tarquini	252
5	(Netherlands) Tom Coronel	207

Yokohama Independents' Trophy standings

	Pos	Driver	Points
	1	(Hungary) Norbert Michelisz	139
	2	(Spain) Pepe Oriola	126
	3	(Italy) Stefano D'Aste	122
1	4	(Germany) Franz Engstler	114
1	5	(United Kingdom) Alex MacDowall	105

Manufacturers' Championship standings

Pos	Manufacturer	Points
1	(United States) Chevrolet	1025
2	(Germany) BMW Customer Racing Teams	650
3	(Spain) SEAT Racing Technology	617

- Note: Only the top five positions are included for both sets of drivers' standings.
