= Célio Alves Dias =

Macanese racing driver

- Nationality: (Macau) Macanese
- Born: 8 December 1971 (age 54) Portuguese Macau

Macau Touring Car Championship career
- Debut season: 2009
- Current team: Fulilai Racing Team
- Car number: 11
- Best finish: 10th in 2014

Previous series
- 2012–2013: WTCC

Célio Alves Dias (born 8 December 1971) is a Macanese racing driver currently competing in the Macau Touring Car Championship. He is a former World Touring Car Championship driver, who made his debut in 2012.

== Racing career ==
Dias began his career in 2009 in the Macau Touring Car Championship, he raced in the championship for several seasons and still does. In 2012, Dias made his World Touring Car Championship debut with China Dragon Racing driving a Chevrolet Lacetti in the Guia Race of Macau. In October 2013, it was announced that he would race at Macau again.

== Racing record ==
=== Complete World Touring Car Championship results ===
(key) (Races in bold indicate pole position – 1 point awarded just in first race; races in italics indicate fastest lap – 1 point awarded all races; * signifies that driver led race for at least one lap – 1 point given all races)

Year	Team	Car	1	2	3	4	5	6	7	8	9	10	11	12	13	14	15	16	17	18	19	20	21	22	23	24	DC	Pts
2012	China Dragon Racing	Chevrolet Lacetti	ITA; 1	ITA; 2	ESP; 1	ESP; 2	MAR; 1	MAR; 2	SVK; 1	SVK; 2	HUN; 1	HUN; 2	AUT; 1	AUT; 2	POR; 1	POR; 2	BRA; 1	BRA; 2	USA; 1	USA; 2	JPN; 1	JPN; 2	CHN; 1	CHN; 2	MAC; 1; 19†	MAC; 2; 15	NC	0
2013	China Dragon Racing	Chevrolet Lacetti	ITA; 1	ITA; 2	MAR; 1	MAR; 2	SVK; 1	SVK; 2	HUN; 1	HUN; 2	AUT; 1	AUT; 2	RUS; 1	RUS; 2	POR; 1	POR; 2	ARG; 1	ARG; 2	USA; 1	USA; 2	JPN; 1	JPN; 2	CHN; 1	CHN; 2	MAC; 1; 23	MAC; 2; 10	25th	1

† — Driver did not finish the race, but was classified as he completed over 90% of the race distance.
