= X-racing ETCR =

Chinese electric touring car series

X-Racing ETCR
- Category: Electric touring cars
- Country: China
- Inaugural season: 2025
- Engine suppliers: Dongfeng eπ 007
- Tyre suppliers: Michelin
- Official website: ctcc.com.cn

ETCR China (officially: X-Racing ETCR Cup or original CTCC电动赛车杯) is a Chinese electric touring car racing series launched in 2025. It is organised by Lisheng Sports under licence from the WSC Group and supported by Michelin China. The series is integrated into selected rounds of the China Touring Car Championship (CTCC).

== History ==
In October 2024, the WSC Group announced the revival of the ETCR concept in China in collaboration with Lisheng Sports and Michelin China. The first season is scheduled for 2025 with Chinese-built electric touring cars such as the Dongfeng eπ 007.

== See also ==
- FIA ETCR – eTouring Car World Cup
- China Touring Car Championship
- TCR China Touring Car Championship
- TCR China Challenge
