= 2020 TCR Asia Series =

Car racing competition

The 2020 TCR Asia Series season was set to be the sixth season of the TCR Asia Series.

== Race calendar ==
The provisional 2020 schedule was announced on 26 November 2019, with five events scheduled. Due to the COVID-19 pandemic in Asia, the TCR Asia Series was to be split into two seasons, TCR Asia North and Asia South which was also cancelled.

== Teams and drivers ==
Team	Car	No.	Drivers	Rounds	Ref.
(South Korea) Solite Indigo Racing	Hyundai i30 N TCR	97	(South Korea) Kim Jin Soo	TBA	
(South Korea) Solite Indigo Racing	Hyundai Veloster N TCR	99	(United Kingdom) Josh Files	TBA	
(United Kingdom) Team MG XPower	MG 6 X-Power TCR	TBA	TBA	TBA	
(United Kingdom) Team MG XPower	MG 6 X-Power TCR	TBA	TBA	TBA	
(Hong Kong) Teamwork Motorsport	Lynk & Co 03 TCR	TBA	TBA	TBA	
(Hong Kong) Teamwork Motorsport	Lynk & Co 03 TCR	TBA	TBA	TBA	
(Hong Kong) Teamwork Motorsport	Lynk & Co 03 TCR	TBA	TBA	TBA	
