= Ma Qinghua =

Chinese racing driver (born 1987)

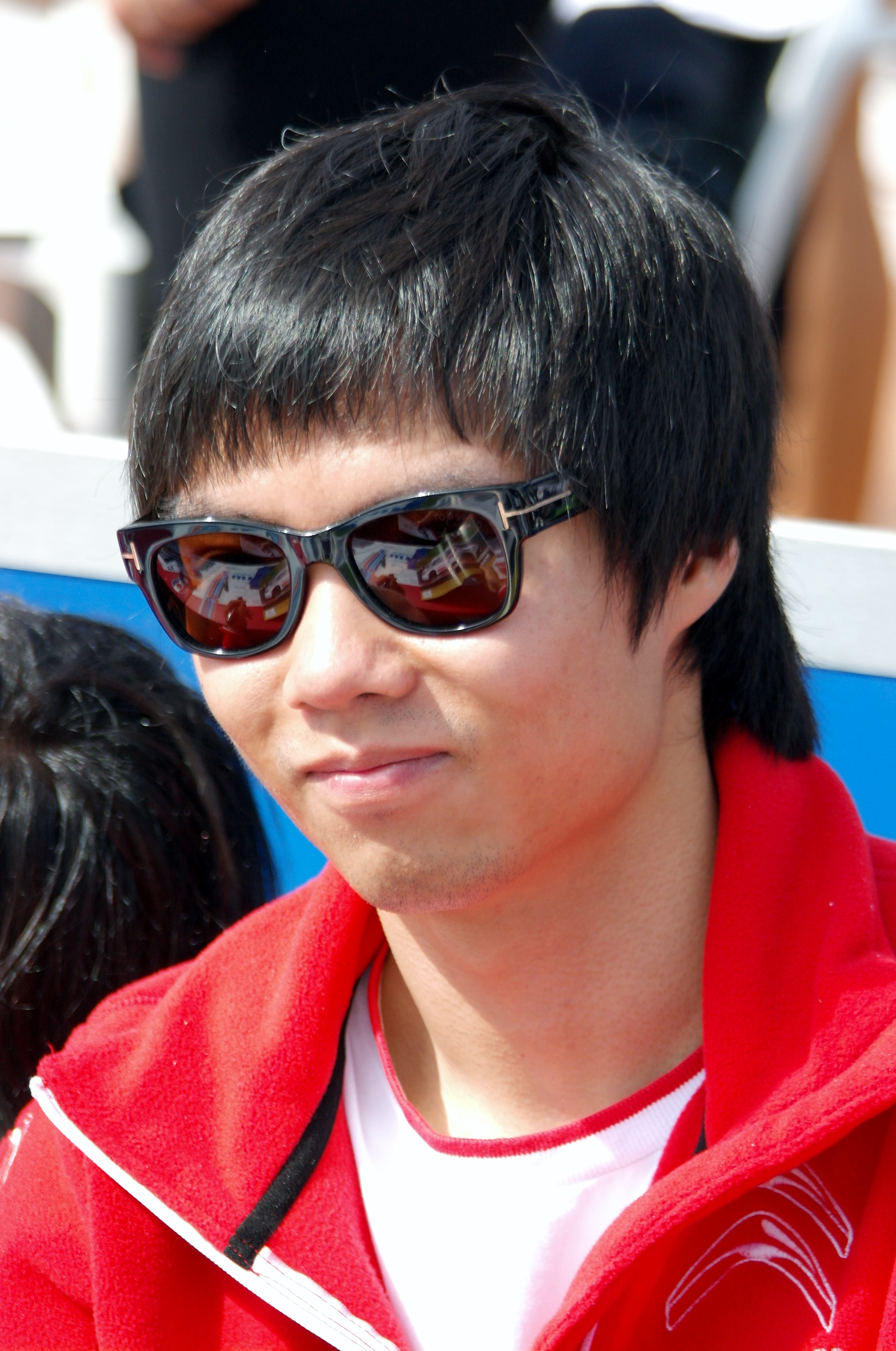
- Ma at the 2014 FIA WTCC Race of Belgium.
- Nationality: (China) Chinese
- Born: 25 December 1987 (age 38) Shanghai, China

World Touring Car Championship career
- Debut season: 2014
- Current team: Sébastien Loeb Racing
- Categorisation: FIA Gold
- Car number: 30
- Former teams: Citroën Total WTCC
- Starts: 36
- Wins: 2
- Poles: 0
- Fastest laps: 2
- Best finish: 4th in 2015

Formula E career
- Debut season: 2015–16
- Car number: 33
- Former teams: Techeetah, Team Aguri, Nio 333 FE Team
- Starts: 14
- Championships: 0
- Wins: 0
- Poles: 0
- Fastest laps: 0
- Best finish: 19th in 2015–16
- Finished last season: 23rd

Previous series
- 2013 2011–12 2010 2009 2008 2006 2006 2005–06 2005: GP2 Series; CTCC; Superleague Formula; British F3 Championship; Spanish F3 Championship; Formula Renault 2.0 NEC; Eurocup Formula Renault 2.0; A1 Grand Prix; Italian Formula 3000

Championship titles
- 2011 2020: CTCC 1600cc TCR China Touring Car Championship

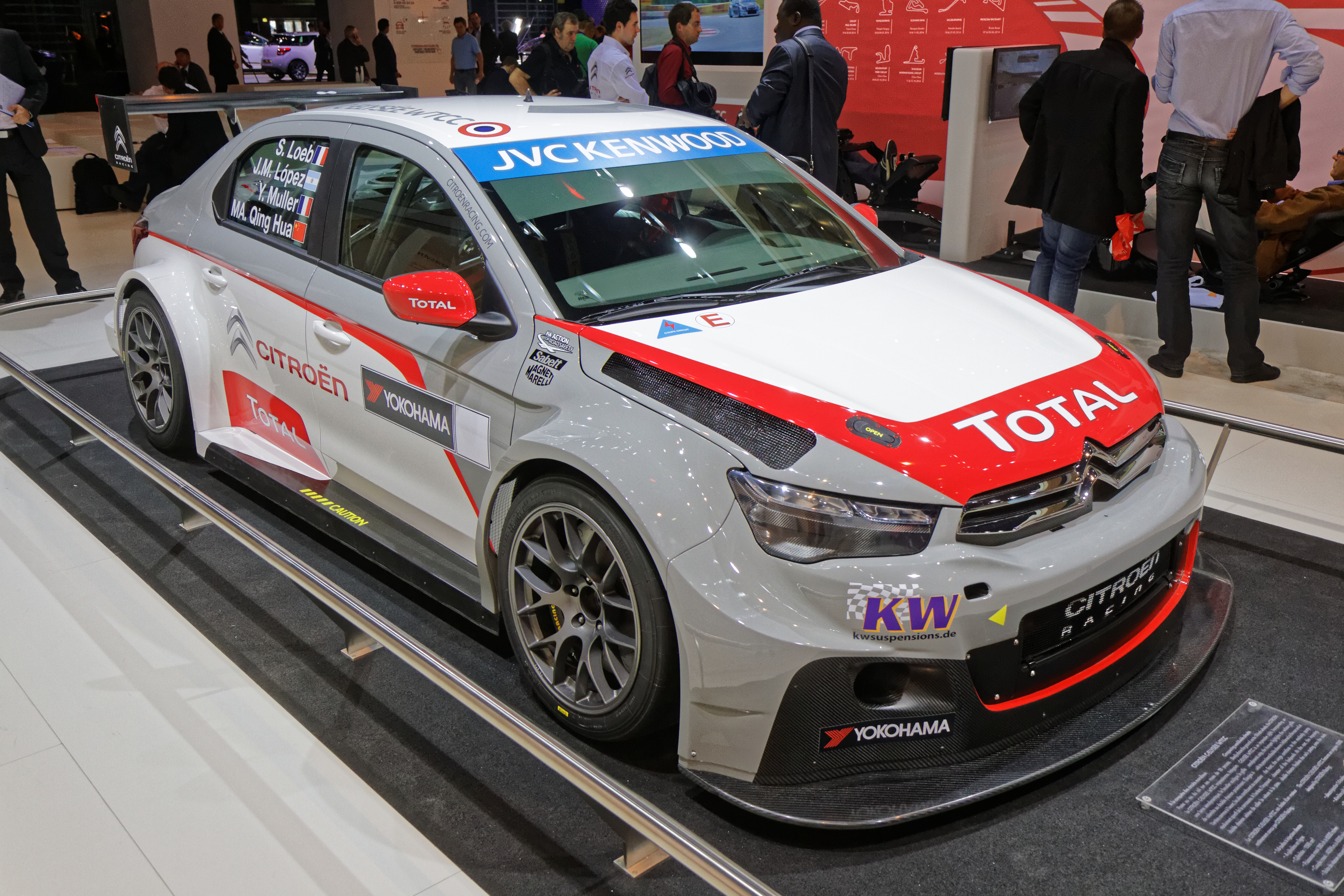
Citroën-Total C-Elysée WTCC 2014

Ma Qinghua (simplified Chinese: 马青骅; traditional Chinese: 馬青驊) (born 25 December 1987) is a Chinese racing driver currently competing in the TCR World Tour with Geely Cyan Racing.

Ma became the first Chinese driver to win an FIA World Championship race when he won race two of the 2014 FIA WTCC Race of Russia. He has also previously competed in the World Touring Car Championship, GP2, a few practice sessions in Formula 1, and Formula E.

== Early life ==
Ma was born on 25 December 1987 in Shanghai. His father, Ma Qiangyun, was the owner of a car repair shop. Ma began karting at the age of eight and his family decided to focus all financial investments towards Ma's testing on more advanced racing tracks. Eventually, in order to make Ma's progress easier, the family invested in a karting track located in Quyang. Ma won the national karting junior championship at the age of twelve.

== Career ==
Ma started his professional racing career in the 2005 Asian Formula Renault challenge with Asia Racing Team for six races, coming 16th with the highest finish of fifth. He also competed in one race in the 2005 Italian Formula 3000 championship for team Astromega and raced in the 2006 Formula Renault 2.0 NEC championship for the same team. He also raced in the inaugural A1 Grand Prix season for Team China at the A1 Grand Prix of Nations, China at the Shanghai International Circuit, coming 17th. For the next few years, he raced in European Formula 3 championships like the 2008 Spanish Formula 3 Championship and 2009 British Formula 3 championship. He then competed in the 2010 Superleague Formula in the 2010 Ordos Superleague Formula round for Team China, and a year later, won the China Touring Car Championship's 1600c class driver's title.

== Formula One ==
=== 2012 ===
Ma was added to the HRT F1 driver development programme on 5 April 2012, and made history as the first China-born driver to drive a Formula One car at an FIA-sanctioned event, a milestone described as "heralding an important step for Chinese motorsport". Ma also became the first driver of Chinese nationality to take part in a Grand Prix weekend when he replaced Narain Karthikeyan in the first Friday practice session of the Italian Grand Prix. He was given three more chances to drive the car in Friday sessions later that year.

=== 2013 ===
Ma had a contract to become a full time HRT driver in 2013, meaning he would become the first ever Chinese Formula 1 driver, however after HRT collapsed at the end of the 2012 season, this would never be and Ma instead moved to Caterham, continuing the role of Friday test driver whilst racing for their GP2 Series team for the season. In 2013 Chinese Grand Prix, he replaced Charles Pic to participate in FP1 and became the first Chinese driver to drive at his home Grand Prix session, but he was about 1.5 seconds off the pace to his teammate Giedo van der Garde and out of the 107% reference time to the quickest driver in Free Practice 1. Soon after the 2013 Chinese Grand Prix, Caterham team claimed that he would be replaced by Alexander Rossi for the rest of the 2013 season. In the 2013 Bahrain GP2 Series round, Alexander Rossi made his debut GP2 Series race and took a podium finish.

== GP2 ==
Ma made his debut GP2 Series race in 2013 Sepang GP2 Series round. Later in the final stint, his lap time dropped to more than two minutes in every lap and finished only 21st in featured race, which is the last place in classified drivers. Later, he was diagnosed with gastroenteritis leading to extreme dehydration by the medical team on track at Sepang and would not start the sprint race.

== World Touring Car Championship ==
Ma raced in the 2014 World Touring Car Championship for Citroën Total WTCC driving at selected rounds in the fourth car. He won the second round of the Race of Russia, becoming the first Chinese driver to win an FIA World Championship race, and scored the fastest lap at the first round of the Race of China, Shanghai, ultimately coming 13th in the championship. He was given a full time seat for 2015 and won the second round of the Race of Portugal and finish fourth in the drivers championship. Despite this, he was not retained for 2016.

== Formula E ==
In 2016, Ma replaced Salvador Duran in the 2015-16 Formula E season for Team Aguri. He retired from his first ePrix but finished the last three races, albeit out of the points. In the next season, Ma was signed by TeCheetah but was replaced by former Haas F1 driver Esteban Gutiérrez following a disappointing series of performances in the first three races of the season.

Ma returned to Formula E in 2017 with the Nio Formula E Team for the Paris ePrix replacing Luca Filippi in a one off appearance and again in the New York ePrix replacing Oliver Turvey who was injured. He returned in 2019 to race for the Nio 333 FE Team alongside Turvey. He was replaced by Daniel Abt for the Berlin rounds as travel restrictions disallowed him from traveling outside China. He was not renewed for the 2020-21 Formula E World Championship by NIO 333.

== TCR China ==
Ma competed in the 2020 TCR China series in a Geely Group Motorsport-built Lynk & Co 03 TCR. He has signed for Shell Teamwork Lynk & Co Motorsport and would partner Lu Wei in the six-event series. On 21 November 2020, at the Guia Race of Macau, Ma finished second in the qualifying race of the 2020 TCR China Touring Car Championship season finale, securing the drivers’ title.

== FIA WTCR ==
On 22 February 2022, it was announced that Ma would join reigning world champions Lynk & Co Cyan Racing to race a Lynk & Co 03 TCR in the 2022 FIA World Touring Car Cup.

== Racing record ==
=== Career summary ===
Season	Series	Team	Races	Wins	Poles	F/Laps	Podiums	Points	Position
2005	Asian Formula Renault Challenge	Shangsai FRD Team	4	0	0	0	0	35	16th
2005	Asian Formula Renault Challenge	Asia Racing Team	2	0	0	0	0	35	16th
2005	Italian Formula 3000	Team Astromega	1	0	0	0	0	0	NC^{†}
2005–06	A1 Grand Prix	A1 Team China	2	0	0	0	0	6	22nd^{‡}
2006	Formula Renault 2.0 NEC	Team Astromega	6	0	0	0	0	33	26th
2008	Spanish Formula 3 Championship	Team West-Tec	11	0	0	0	0	0	18th
2008	Formula 3 Spain Copa de España	Team West-Tec	11	0	0	0	2	24	7th
2009	British Formula 3 International Series - National	Team West-Tec	2	0	0	0	0	10	10th
2010	Superleague Formula	Team China	2	0	0	0	0	19	26th^{‡}
2011	China Touring Car Championship - 1600cc	Beijing Hyundai	8	3	4	?	?	116	**1st**
2012	Formula One	HRT Formula 1 Team	Test driver						
2013	GP2 Series	Caterham Racing	1	0	0	0	0	0	35th
2013	Formula One	Caterham F1 Team	Test driver						
2014	World Touring Car Championship	Citroën Total WTCC	10	1	0	1	2	69	13th
2015	World Touring Car Championship	Citroën Total WTCC	24	1	0	1	6	241	4th
2015–16	Formula E	Team Aguri	4	0	0	0	0	0	19th
2016–17	Formula E	Techeetah	3	0	0	0	0	0	25th
2017	World Touring Car Championship	Sébastien Loeb Racing	2	0	0	1	0	0	21st
2017	TCR China Touring Car Championship	TeamWork Motorsport	1	0	0	1	1	36	15th
2017	TCR Asia Series	TeamWork Motorsport	2	0	0	0	0	0	NC†
2017	FRD LMP3 Series	S&D Motorsports	6	0	0	0	0	31	13th
2017–18	Formula E	Nio Formula E Team	2	0	0	0	0	0	23rd
2018	World Touring Car Cup	Boutsen Ginion Racing	8	0	0	0	0	7	30th
2018	World Rallycross Championship	STARD	1	0	0	0	0	0	37th
2018–19	Formula E	Nio Formula E Team	Reserve driver						
2019	World Touring Car Cup	Team Mulsanne	30	1	0	1	4	133	16th
2019–20	Formula E	Nio 333 FE Team	5	0	0	0	0	0	28th
2020	TCR China Touring Car Championship	Shell Teamwork Lynk & Co Motorsport	12	4	1	6	8	154	**1st**
2021	TCR Asia Series	Shell Teamwork Lynk & Co Motorsport	12	4	3	1	9	239	**2nd**
2021	TCR China Touring Car Championship	Shell Teamwork Lynk & Co Motorsport	2	0	0	0	0	0	NC†
2022	World Touring Car Cup	Cyan Performance Lynk & Co	8	0	0	0	1	97	12th
2023	TCR World Tour	Cyan Racing Lynk & Co	20	1	0	1	3	265	9th
2023	TCR Europe Touring Car Series	Cyan Racing Lynk & Co	6	0	0	0	0	0	NC†
2023	TCR Italy Touring Car Championship	Cyan Racing Lynk & Co	2	0	0	0	0	0	NC†
2023	TCR South America Touring Car Championship	Cyan Racing Lynk & Co	4	1	0	0	2	0	NC†
2023	TCR Australia Touring Car Series	Cyan Racing Lynk & Co	6	0	0	1	1	0	NC†
2023	TCR China Touring Car Championship	Shell Teamwork Lynk & Co Racing	2	1	0	1	2	40	12th
2024	TCR World Tour	Cyan Racing Lynk & Co	14	2	0	2	4	214	8th
2024	TCR Italy Touring Car Championship	Cyan Racing Lynk & Co	2	0	0	0	0	0	NC†
2024	TCR South America Touring Car Championship	Cyan Racing Lynk & Co	4	0	0	0	1	63	21st
2025	TCR World Tour	Lynk & Co Cyan Racing	20	0	0	2	3	304	5th
2025	TCR Australia Touring Car Series	Lynk & Co Cyan Racing	4	0	0	0	1	0	NC†
2025	Nürburgring Langstrecken-Serie - AT3	Fancy Motorsport							
2026	TCR World Tour	Geely Cyan Racing	18	1	0	1	3	286	7th*

^{†} As Ma was a guest driver, he was ineligible for points.
^{‡} Team point score.
^{*} Season still in progress.

=== Complete Asian Formula Renault Challenge results ===
(key) (Races in bold indicate pole position) (Races in italics indicate fastest lap)

Year	Entrant	1	2	3	4	5	6	7	8	9	10	11	12	13	DC	Points
2005	Shangsai FRD Team	SHA1; 1; 24	SHA1; 2; 23	ZHU1; 1; 5	ZHU1; 2 Ret	SEP; 1	SEP; 2								16th	35
2005	Asia Racing Team							ZHU2; 1; 9	ZHU2; 2; 8	SHA2; 1	SHA2; 2	CHE; 1	CHE; 2	MAC	16th	35

=== Complete Italian Formula 3000 Championship results ===
(key) (Races in bold indicate pole position) (Races in italics indicate fastest lap)

Year	Entrant	1	2	3	4	5	6	7	8	DC	Points
2005	Team Astromega	ADR	VLL	BRN	IMO	MUG	MAG	MNZ	MIS; 11	27th	0

=== Complete A1 Grand Prix results ===
(key) (Races in bold indicate pole position) (Races in italics indicate fastest lap)

Year	Team	1	2	3	4	5	6	7	8	9	10	11	12	13	14	15	16	17	18	19	20	21	22	DC	Points
2005-06	China	GBR; SPR; QO	GBR; FEA; QO	GER; SPR	GER; FEA	POR; SPR	POR; FEA	AUS; SPR	AUS; FEA	MYS; SPR	MYS; FEA	UAE; SPR	UAE; FEA	RSA; SPR	RSA; FEA	IDN; SPR	IDN; FEA	MEX; SPR; QO	MEX; FEA; QO	USA; SPR	USA; FEA	CHN; SPR; 14	CHN; FEA; 16	22nd	6

=== Complete Formula Renault 2.0 Northern European Cup results ===
(key) (Races in bold indicate pole position) (Races in italics indicate fastest lap)

Year	Team	1	2	3	4	5	6	7	8	9	10	11	12	13	14	15	16	DC	Points
2006	Team Astromega	OSC1; 1	OSC1; 2	SPA; 1	SPA; 2	NÜR; 1; 11	NÜR; 2 EX	ZAN; 1; 17	ZAN; 2; 13	OSC2; 1; 16	OSC2; 2; 15	ASS; 1	ASS; 2	AND; 1	AND; 2	SAL; 1	SAL; 2	26th	33

=== Complete Eurocup Formula Renault 2.0 results ===
(key) (Races in bold indicate pole position; races in italics indicate fastest lap)

Year	Entrant	1	2	3	4	5	6	7	8	9	10	11	12	13	14	DC	Points
2006	Team Astromega	ZOL; 1	ZOL; 2	IST; 1	IST; 2	MIS; 1; 21	MIS; 2; 22	NÜR; 1	NÜR; 2	DON; 1	DON; 2	LMS; 1	LMS; 2	CAT; 1	CAT; 2	NC†	0

† As Ma was a guest driver, he was ineligible for points

=== Complete Spanish Formula Three Championship results ===
(key) (Races in bold indicate pole position) (Races in italics indicate fastest lap)

Year	Team	1	2	3	4	5	6	7	8	9	10	11	12	13	14	15	16	17	DC	Points
2008	Team West-Tec	JAR; 1	JAR; 2	SPA; 1	SPA; 2	ALB; 1	ALB; 2	VSC; 1; 15	VSC; 2; 12	VF1; 12	MAG; 1; 15	MAG; 2; 8	VAL; 1; 22	VAL; 2; 14	JER; 1; 8	JER; 2; 7	CAT; 1 Ret	CAT; 2; 14	18th	7

=== Complete British Formula Three Championship results ===
(key) (Races in bold indicate pole position) (Races in italics indicate fastest lap)

Year	Class	Team	Chassis	Engine	1	2	3	4	5	6	7	8	9	10	11	12	13	14	15	16	17	18	19	20	DC	Points
2009	National	Team West-Tec	Dallara F307	Mugen-Honda	OUL; 1	OUL; 2	SIL1; 1	SIL1; 2	ROC; 1	ROC; 2	HOC; 1	HOC; 2	SNE; 1	SNE; 2	DON; 1	DON; 2	SPA; 1	SPA; 2	SIL2; 1	SIL2; 2	ALG; 1	ALG; 2	BRH; 1; 16	BRH; 2 Ret	10th	10

=== Complete Formula One participations ===
(key) (Races in bold indicate pole position) (Races in italics indicates fastest lap)

Year	Entrant	Chassis	Engine	1	2	3	4	5	6	7	8	9	10	11	12	13	14	15	16	17	18	19	20	WDC	Points
2012	HRT Formula 1 Team	HRT F112	Cosworth CA2012 2.4 V8	AUS	MAL	CHN	BHR	ESP	MON	CAN	EUR	GBR	GER	HUN	BEL	ITA; TD	SIN; TD	JPN	KOR	IND	ABU; TD	USA; TD	BRA	-	-
2013	Caterham F1 Team	Caterham CT03	Renault RS27-2013 2.4 V8	AUS	MAL	CHN; TD	BHR	ESP	MON	CAN	GBR	GER	HUN	BEL	ITA	SIN	KOR	JPN	IND	ABU	USA	BRA		-	-

=== Complete GP2 Series results ===
(key) (Races in bold indicate pole position) (Races in italics indicate fastest lap)

Year	Entrant	1	2	3	4	5	6	7	8	9	10	11	12	13	14	15	16	17	18	19	20	21	22	DC	Points
2013	Caterham Racing	SEP; FEA; 21	SEP; SPR; DNS	BHR; FEA	BHR; SPR	CAT; FEA	CAT; SPR	MON; FEA	MON; SPR	SIL; FEA	SIL; SPR	NÜR; FEA	NÜR; SPR	HUN; FEA	HUN; SPR	SPA; FEA	SPA; SPR	MNZ; FEA	MNZ; SPR	MRN; FEA	MRN; SPR	YMC; FEA	YMC; SPR	35th	0

=== Complete World Touring Car Championship results ===
(key) (Races in bold indicate pole position) (Races in italics indicate fastest lap)

Year	Team	Car	1	2	3	4	5	6	7	8	9	10	11	12	13	14	15	16	17	18	19	20	21	22	23	24	DC	Points
2014	Citroën Total WTCC	Citroën C-Elysée WTCC	MAR; 1	MAR; 2	FRA; 1	FRA; 2	HUN; 1	HUN; 2	SVK; 1	SVK; 2	AUT; 1	AUT; 2	RUS; 1; 6	RUS; 2; 1	BEL; 1; 11	BEL; 2 Ret	ARG; 1	ARG; 2	BEI; 1; 15†	BEI; 2; 12	CHN; 1; 2	CHN; 2; 5	JPN; 1	JPN; 2	MAC; 1; 8	MAC; 2 Ret	13th	69
2015	Citroën Total WTCC	Citroën C-Elysée WTCC	ARG; 1; 7	ARG; 2; 6	MAR; 1; 2	MAR; 2; 10	HUN; 1; 4	HUN; 2; 9	GER; 1; 5	GER; 2 Ret	RUS; 1; 5	RUS; 2; 5	SVK; 1 Ret	SVK; 2 Ret	FRA; 1; 4	FRA; 2; 3	POR; 1; 6	**POR**; **2**; 1	JPN; 1; 4	JPN; 2; 5	CHN; 1; 10†	CHN; 2; 8	THA; 1; 3	THA; 2; 2	QAT; 1; 5	QAT; 2; 2	4th	241
2017	Sébastien Loeb Racing	Citroën C-Elysée WTCC	MAR; 1	MAR; 2	ITA; 1	ITA; 2	HUN; 1	HUN; 2	GER; 1	GER; 2	POR; 1	POR; 2	ARG; 1	ARG; 2	CHN; 1	CHN; 2	JPN; 1	JPN; 2	MAC; 1; 14	MAC; 2; 12	QAT; 1	QAT; 2					21st	0

^{†} Driver did not finish the race, but was classified as he completed over 90% of the race distance.

=== Complete Formula E results ===
(key) (Races in bold indicate pole position; races in italics indicate fastest lap)

Year	Team	Chassis	Powertrain	1	2	3	4	5	6	7	8	9	10	11	12	Pos	Points
2015–16	Team Aguri	Spark SRT01-e	SRT01-e	BEI	PUT	PDE	BUE	MEX	LBH	PAR; Ret	BER; 14	LDN; 11	LDN; 12			19th	0
2016–17	Techeetah	Spark SRT01-e	Renault Z.E. 16	HKG; Ret	MRK; 15	BUE; 16	MEX	MCO	PAR	BER	BER	NYC	NYC	MTL	MTL	25th	0
2017–18	Nio Formula E Team	Spark SRT01-e	NextEV Nio Sport 003	HKG	HKG	MRK	SCL	MEX	PDE	RME	PAR; 17	BER	ZUR	NYC	NYC; 13	23rd	0
2019–20	Nio 333 FE Team	Spark SRT05e	Nio FE-005	DIR; 20	DIR; 19	SCL; 16	MEX; Ret	MRK; 23	BER	BER	BER	BER	BER	BER		28th	0

=== Complete TCR China Touring Car Championship results ===
(key) (Races in bold indicate pole position) (Races in italics indicate fastest lap)

Year	Team	Car	1	2	3	4	5	6	7	8	9	10	11	12	13	14	15	DC	Points
2017	Teamwork Motorsport	Volkswagen Golf GTI TCR	SHA1; 1	SHA1; 2	SHA1; 3	SHA2; 1	SHA2; 2	SHA2; 3; 2	ZHE; 1	ZHE; 2	ZHE; 3	NIN; 1	NIN; 2	NIN; 3	GUA; 1	GUA; 2	GUA; 3	15th	36
2020	Shell Teamwork Lynk & Co Motorsport	Lynk & Co 03 TCR	**ZHU1**; **1**; 1	ZHU1; 2; 1	ZHU2; 1; 1	ZHU2; 2; 2	SHA; 1; 1	SHA; 2; 2	JIA1; 1; 2	JIA1; 2; 4	JIA2; 1 Ret	JIA2; 2; 5	MAC; 1; 2	MAC; 2 Ret				1st	154

=== Complete World Touring Car Cup results ===
(key) (Races in bold indicate pole position) (Races in italics indicate fastest lap)

Year	Team	Car	1	2	3	4	5	6	7	8	9	10	11	12	13	14	15	16	17	18	19	20	21	22	23	24	25	26	27	28	29	30	DC	Points
2018	Boutsen Ginion Racing	Honda Civic Type R TCR	MAR; 1	MAR; 2	MAR; 3	HUN; 1	HUN; 2	HUN; 3	GER; 1	GER; 2	GER; 3	NED; 1	NED; 2	NED; 3	POR; 1	POR; 2	POR; 3	SVK; 1	SVK; 2	SVK; 3	CHN; 1; 19	CHN; 2; 17	CHN; 3 DNS	WUH; 1; 11	WUH; 2; 12	WUH; 3; 7	JPN; 1	JPN; 2	JPN; 3	MAC; 1 Ret	MAC; 2; 13	MAC; 3; 11	30th	7
2019	Team Mulsanne	Alfa Romeo Giulietta Veloce TCR	MAR; 1 Ret	MAR; 2 Ret	MAR; 3; 9	HUN; 1; 25	HUN; 2; 11	HUN; 3; 19	SVK; 1; 2	SVK; 2; 9	SVK; 3; 1	NED; 1; 21	NED; 2; 25	NED; 3; 21	GER; 1; 21	GER; 2; 22	GER; 3; 15	POR; 1; 14	POR; 2; 2	POR; 3; 8	CHN; 1; 2	CHN; 2 Ret	CHN; 3; 16†	JPN; 1; 9	JPN; 2; 23	JPN; 3 Ret	MAC; 1 Ret	MAC; 2; 17	MAC; 3; 22	MAL; 1; 18	MAL; 2; 17	MAL; 3; 23	16th	133
2022	Cyan Performance Lynk & Co	Lynk & Co 03 TCR	FRA; 1; 5	FRA; 2; 3	GER; 1 C	GER; 2 C	HUN; 1; 5	HUN; 2; 5	ESP; 1; 13	ESP; 2; 6	POR; 1; 5	POR; 2; 6	ITA; 1 DNS	ITA; 2 DNS	ALS; 1 WD	ALS; 2 WD	BHR; 1	BHR; 2	SAU; 1	SAU; 2													12th	97

^{†} Driver did not finish the race, but was classified as he completed over 90% of the race distance.

=== Complete FIA World Rallycross Championship results ===
==== Supercar ====
Year	Entrant	Car	1	2	3	4	5	6	7	8	9	10	11	12	WRX	Points
2018	Team STARD	Ford Fiesta	BAR	POR	BEL	GBR; 23	NOR	SWE	CAN	FRA	LAT	USA	GER	RSA	36th	0

=== Complete TCR World Tour results ===
(key) (Races in bold indicate pole position) (Races in italics indicate fastest lap)

Year	Team	Car	1	2	3	4	5	6	7	8	9	10	11	12	13	14	15	16	17	18	19	20	21	DC	Points
2023	Cyan Racing Lynk & Co	Lynk & Co 03 FL TCR	ALG; 1; 6	ALG; 2; 10	SPA; 1; 14	SPA; 2; 13	VAL; 1; 9	VAL; 2; 13	HUN; 1; 4	HUN; 2; 8	ELP; 1; 9	ELP; 2; 1	VIL; 1; 4	VIL; 2; 2	SYD; 1; 2	SYD; 2 Ret	SYD; 3; 9	BAT; 1; 16	BAT; 2; 13	BAT; 3; 9	MAC; 1; 7	MAC; 2; 5		9th	265
2024	Cyan Racing Lynk & Co	Lynk & Co 03 FL TCR	VAL; 1; 8	VAL; 2; 9	MRK; 1; 7	MRK; 2; 1	MOH; 1; 7	MOH; 2; 2	SAP; 1; 7	SAP; 2; 3	ELP; 1; 16	ELP; 2; 7	ZHZ; 1; 13	ZHZ; 2; 1	MAC; 1 Ret	MAC; 2; 4								8th	214
2025	Lynk & Co Cyan Racing	Lynk & Co 03 FL TCR	AHR; 1; 6	AHR; 2; 6	AHR; 3; 6	CRT; 1; 3	CRT; 2; 10	CRT; 3; 7	MNZ; 1 Ret	MNZ; 2; 10	CVR; 1; 6	CVR; 2; 2	BEN; 1 C	BEN; 2; 6	BEN; 3; 8	INJ; 1; 9	INJ; 2; 7	INJ; 3; 8	ZHZ; 1; 6	ZHZ; 2; 7	ZHZ; 3; 9	MAC; 1; 6	MAC; 2; 2	5th	304
2026	Geely Cyan Racing	Geely Preface TCR	MIS; 1; 8	MIS; 2; 1	CRT; 1 Ret	CRT; 2; 4	CRT; 3 Ret	LEC; 1; 7	LEC; 2; 2	CVR; 1; 4	CVR; 2; 6	INJ; 1; 10	INJ; 2; 2	INJ; 3; 8	CHE; 1; 8	CHE; 2; 6	CHE; 3; 6	ZHZ; 1; 5	ZHZ; 2; 11	ZHZ; 3; 5	MAC; 1	MAC; 2		7th*	286*

^{*} Season still in progress.

=== Complete TCR Europe Touring Car Series results ===
(key) (Races in bold indicate pole position) (Races in italics indicate fastest lap)

Year	Team	Car	1	2	3	4	5	6	7	8	9	10	11	12	13	14	DC	Points
2023	Cyan Racing Lynk & Co	Lynk & Co 03 FL TCR	ALG; 1; 6	ALG; 2; 10	PAU; 1	PAU; 2	SPA; 1; 14	SPA; 2; 13	HUN; 1; 4	HUN; 2; 8	LEC; 1	LEC; 2	MNZ; 1	MNZ; 2	CAT; 1	CAT; 2	NC‡	0‡

^{‡} Driver was a World Tour full-time entry and was ineligible for points.
