= Jiangsu Wantrack International Circuit =

Motorsport circuit in Nanjing, China

- Location: Nanjing, Jiangsu, China
- Coordinates: 31°40′17.27″N 119°01′58.97″E
- FIA Grade: 4
- Opened: 2014
- Major events: Former: CTCC (2016, 2020); TCR China (2020)

Full Circuit (2014–present)
- Surface: Asphalt
- Length: 2.014 km (1.251 mi)
- Turns: 12
- Race lap record: 1:08.205 ( (China) Wang Tao, Lynk & Co 03 TCR, 2020, TCR)

The Jiangsu Wantrack International Circuit is a 2.014 km (1.251 mi) FIA Grade 4 motorsport circuit in Nanjing, China. The circuit was opened in 2014.

== Lap records ==
As of November 2020, the fastest official race lap records at the Jiangsu Wantrack International Circuit are listed as:

Category	Time	Driver	Vehicle	Event
Full Circuit (2014–present): 2.014 km (1.251 mi)
TCR Touring Car	1:08.205	Wang Tao	Lynk & Co 03 TCR	2020 2nd Nanjing TCR China round
