= TCR China Touring Car Championship =

Touring car racing series

- Category: Touring cars
- Country: China
- Inaugural season: 2017
- Drivers' champion: (China) Martin Cao
- Teams' champion: (China) Shell Teamwork Lynk & Co Racing
- Official website: http://www.tcrchina.com

The TCR China Touring Car Championship is a touring car racing series based in China. The series was officially launched in December 2016, ahead of a five-round 2017 championship season, with the slight name change from Chinese to China. In 2024, the TCR China Challenge was established to split the field due to an excessive number of cars in the main championship.

== Champions ==
Drivers' Champions				Teams' Champions	
Year	Driver	Team	Car	Team	Car
2017	(Hong Kong) Andy Yan	(China) NewFaster Team	Audi RS3 LMS TCR	None	
2018	(Hong Kong) Alex Hui (Hong Kong) Sunny Wong	(Hong Kong) Teamwork Motorsport	Volkswagen Golf GTI TCR	None	
2019	(China) Huang Chu Han	(China) Liqui Moly Team NewFaster	Audi RS3 LMS TCR	(China) Liqui Moly Team NewFaster	Audi RS3 LMS TCR
2020	(China) Ma Qing Hua	(China) Shell Teamwork Lynk & Co Motorsport	Lynk & Co 03 TCR	(China) Team MG XPower	MG 6 X-Power TCR
2021	(Macau) Rodolfo Ávila	(China) Team MG XPower	MG 6 X-Power TCR	(China) Team MG XPower	MG 6 X-Power TCR
2022	Not held				
2023	(China) Martin Cao	(South Korea) Hyundai N Team	Hyundai Elantra N TCR	(China) Shell Teamwork Lynk & Co Racing	Lynk & Co 03 TCR
2024	(China) Martin Cao	(South Korea) Hyundai N	Hyundai Elantra N TCR	(China) Lynk & Co Teamwork Motorsport	Lynk & Co 03 TCR
2025	(China) David Zhu	(Hong Kong) Lynk & Co Teamwork	Lynk & Co 03 TCR		
2026					

== Circuits ==
- (China) Shanghai International Circuit (2017–2021, 2023–present)
- (China) Zhejiang International Circuit (2017, 2019, 2023–present)
- (China) Ningbo International Circuit (2017–2019, 2024–present)
- (China) Guangdong International Circuit (2017–2018)
- (Macau) Guia Circuit (2017, 2020, 2023)
- (China) Zhuhai International Circuit (2018–2019)
- (China) Hunan International Circuit (2019, 2021, 2023–2025)
- (China) Shanghai Tianma Circuit (2020–2021)
- (China) Jiangsu Wantrack International Circuit (2020)
- (China) Ordos International Circuit (2025–present)
- (China) Chengdu Tianfu International Circuit (2026)

== TCR China Challenge ==
The TCR China Challenge (also known as the TCR China Challenge Series or originally TCR中国挑战赛) forms part of the TCR China Touring Car Championship. The series was established shortly before the start of the 2024 TCR China Touring Car Championship season, after the main championship reached a high number of entries. To accommodate the growing grid, the field was divided into two categories: the TCR China Championship and the TCR China Challenge. The Challenge was intended primarily for privateer drivers, smaller teams, and gentleman drivers.

In its inaugural 2024 season, Li Guang Hua (李光华) won the drivers' title by a margin of just 1 point. From the 2025 season onwards, the Challenge is expected to share most of its race weekends with the main TCR China championship. While competing in the same races, Challenge drivers are classified separately, meaning they score full points based on their position within the Challenge class, regardless of their overall race position. From the 2026 season onwards, the TCR China Challenge is discontinued, as the series returns to a single championship format under the TCR China Touring Car Championship.
