= Geely Preface TCR =

- Category: TCR Touring Car
- Constructor: Cyan Racing
- Designers: Alexander Murdzevski Schedvin (Head, Geely Group Motorsport)
- Predecessor: Lynk & Co 03 TCR

Technical specifications
- Chassis: Geely Preface
- Suspension (front): MacPherson adjustable shock absorbers
- Suspension (rear): Multi-link adjustable shock absorbers Interior
- Length: 4,740 mm (186.6 in)
- Width: 1,950 mm (76.8 in)
- Wheelbase: 2,760 mm (108.7 in)
- Engine: Volvo JLH-4G20TD 1,969 cc (120 cu in) 350 hp (261 kW; 355 PS) I4 turbocharged front-mounted, FWD
- Torque: 420 N⋅m (310 lb⋅ft)
- Transmission: Xtrac 6-speed Sequential
- Weight: 1,265 kg (2,789 lb)
- Brakes: Front: Six-piston calipers 380mm ventilated disc Rear: Two-piston calipers 278mm ventilated disc

Competition history
- Notable entrants: (China) Geely Cyan Racing
- Notable drivers: (Sweden) Thed Björk (France) Yann Ehrlacher (China) Ma Qinghua (Uruguay) Santiago Urrutia
- Debut: 2026 TCR World Tour Misano Round

The Geely Preface TCR is a racing car developed by Cyan Racing. The race car is based on the Geely Xingrui (Preface).

== Development ==
The Preface TCR was unveiled by Cyan Racing and Geely in November 2025 at the Guangzhou Auto Show. Ahead of the 2026 TCR World Tour season, the Preface TCR underwent testing at Misano World Circuit.

== Racing history ==
The Preface TCR made its racing debut at Misano, winning Race 2 with driver Ma Qinghua. At the second round in Valencia, Santiago Urrutia won all three races to take the points lead.
