= 2012 FIA WTCC Race of China =

World touring car championship

2012 Race of China
Race details
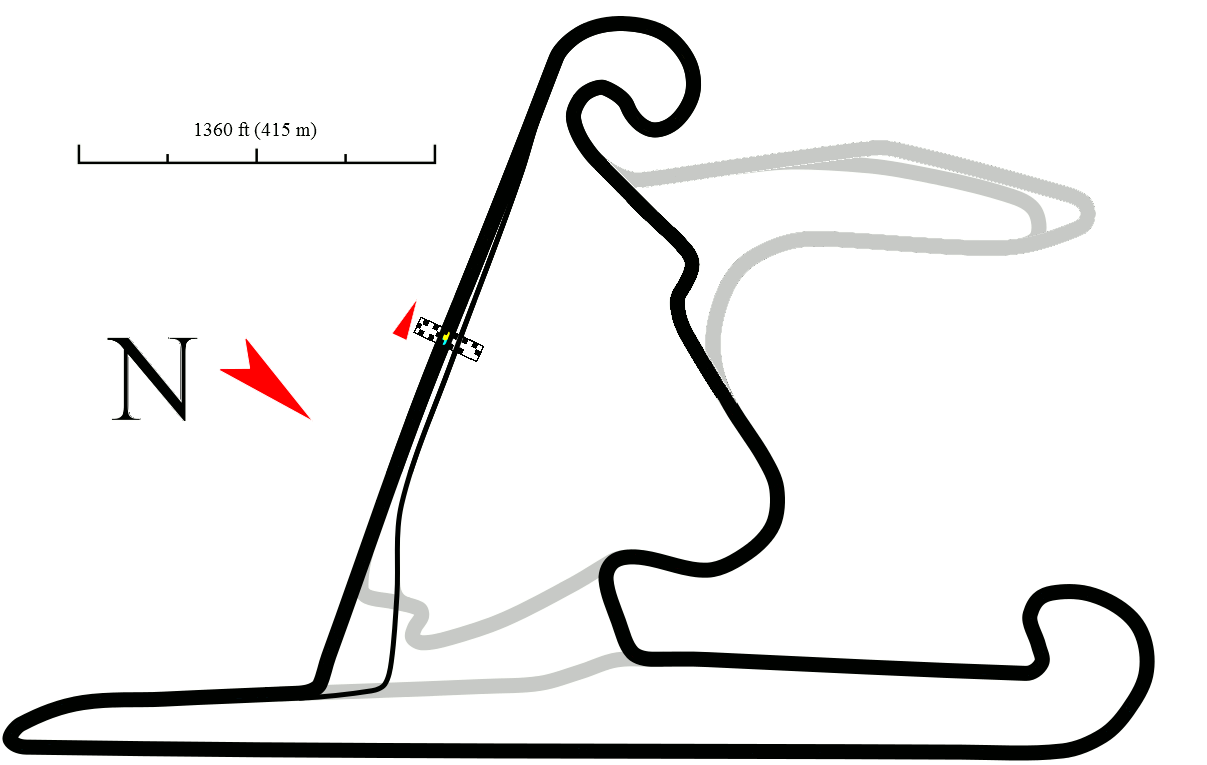
- Round 11 of 12 in the 2012 World Touring Car Championship at Shanghai International Circuit in Shanghai, China.
- Date: 4 November, 2012
- Location: Shanghai, China
- Course: Shanghai International Circuit; 4.603 kilometres (2.860 mi)

Race One
- Laps: 13
Pole position
Driver		(Switzerland) Alain Menu	Chevrolet
Time		1:54.383	
Podium
First		(Switzerland) Alain Menu	Chevrolet
Second		(United Kingdom) Robert Huff	Chevrolet
Third		(Italy) Stefano D'Aste	Wiechers-Sport
Fastest Lap
Driver		(Switzerland) Alain Menu	Chevrolet
Time		1:54.947	

Race Two
- Laps: 13
Podium
First		(United Kingdom) Robert Huff	Chevrolet
Second		(Switzerland) Alain Menu	Chevrolet
Third		(Netherlands) Tom Coronel	ROAL Motorsport
Fastest Lap
Driver		(United Kingdom) Robert Huff	Chevrolet
Time		1:55.546	

The 2012 FIA WTCC Race of China was the penultimate round of the 2012 World Touring Car Championship season and the second running of the FIA WTCC Race of China. It was held on 4 November 2012 at the Shanghai International Circuit in Shanghai, China for the first time, as the previous year's race was held at the nearby Shanghai Tianma Circuit. Both races were won by Chevrolet with Alain Menu winning race one and Robert Huff winning race two.

== Background ==
Following the previous round in Japan, Yvan Muller and Robert Huff were tied at the top of the drivers' championship on 345 points. Norbert Michelisz was leading the Yokohama Independents' Trophy.

Macanese driver Alex Liu joined Liqui Moly Team Engstler to drive their naturally aspirated BMW 320si. Tom Boardman was the only entry for Special Tuning Racing after the team were unable to find a driver for their second car. 2009 British Touring Car Championship champion Colin Turkington returned to the WTCC with Team Aviva-Cofco who were running a Chevrolet Cruze 1.6T. French SEAT León Supercopa driver Hugo Valente would drive for SUNRED Engineering in a SUNRED SR León 1.6T while Fredy Barth returned to the championship to drive a latest specification SEAT León WTCC for SUNRED under the SEAT Swiss Racing by SUNRED banner. Son Veng Racing Team entered a Honda Accord Euro R for Kelvin Leong and Look Fong Racing Team ran a naturally aspirated Chevrolet Cruze LT for Eric Kwong. China Dragon Racing entered a Chevrolet Lacetti for Felipe De Souza and a Chevrolet Cruze LT for Kin Veng Ng.

== Report ==
=== Free Practice ===
Alex MacDowall set the fastest time in Friday testing ahead of the works Chevrolet drivers. Turkington set the fifth fastest time on his return to racing, his first time in a front wheel drive car since 2006. Alain Menu could only manage a time that could only get him up to eleventh.

It was Turkington who was quickest in Saturday's first free practice session in the Team Aviva-Cofco Chevrolet Cruze 1.6T, he set the time early and it went unbeaten for the rest of the 30-minute session. Pepe Oriola brought out the red flag two minutes before the end of the session when he stopped his car on the start-finish straight; fellow SEAT driver Fredy Barth was unable to run in the session.

Menu was on top in free practice two in his Chevrolet, the works trio having spent the session swapping fastest times. Independents' leader Michelisz was fifth fastest, Turkington was eighth after topping the first session and Tiago Monteiro was fifteenth in the Honda Racing Team JAS Honda Civic.

=== Qualifying ===
Menu claimed his third consecutive pole position of the year, with title rivals Muller second and Huff fourth. Michelisz was the leading independent driver in third. Turkington was fifth on his return to the WTCC, putting ahead of the works Chevrolet trio for race two. A set up change for Gabriele Tarquini in Q2 put him only ninth fastest but with the benefit of a front row start in race two. Barth was 12th on his return, while Monteiro could only manage 17th in the second event for the Honda Civic. James Nash was the quickest of the Team Aon pair in 15th, with teammate Tom Chilton down in 22nd ahead of series debutant Hugo Valente. Liu failed to set a time within the 107% time in his naturally aspirated BMW 320si but was later allowed to race by the stewards.

=== Warm-Up ===
Huff led a Chevrolet 1–2–3 in the Sunday morning warm up ahead of Muller and Turkington. Independents' points leader Michelisz was fourth and pole sitter Menu was fifth. Liu beached his BMW 320si in the gravel with five minutes to go.

=== Race One ===
Menu completed a lights to flag victory ahead of Huff but teammate and championship leader Muller retired on the first lap with broken rear suspension. The breakage came in a second corner incident which also saw MacDowall, Turkington, Oriola, Darryl O'Young and Tom Coronel involved in a pile up. Michelisz was issued with a drive through penalty on lap five at a time when there was plenty of action in the midfield. Turkington had dropped to the back of the field on the opening lap but by the end of the race had climbed back up to eighth. Second place for Huff and a non-finish for Muller handed Huff the championship lead. After the race, Valente, Nash, Boardman, Monteiro and Barth were issued with 30-second time penalties for missing the chicane to avoid a pileup, dropping the latter three out of the points. Charles Ng picked up his first point of the season as a result.

=== Race Two ===
Coronel led away from the start with D'Aste jumping up to second after a slow start for Tarquini. The drivers' door on the Wiechers-Sport car of D'Aste was hanging loose and on the third lap he was an easy target for the Chevrolet trio led by Menu, Coronel was passed a lap later. Turkington was once again fighting back from near the back and he was back up to tenth by lap 6 at the expense of Alberto Cerqui. Menu was leading until the start of lap 8 when Muller out-braked himself and the pair tangled, half-spinning Menu and allowing Huff to pass both of them to take the lead. Muller was second until he was passed by Menu a lap later, the pair swapped places again on lap 11 at the final hairpin. Huff won the race ahead of Muller and Menu with D'Aste the independent winner in sixth. Turkington had climbed up to eighth by the finish. Muller was given a retrospective drive through penalty after the race, dropping him to 13th in the classification.

== Results ==
=== Qualifying ===
Pos.	No.	Name	Team	Car	C	Q1	Q2	Points
1	8	(Switzerland) Alain Menu	Chevrolet	Chevrolet Cruze 1.6T		1:54.775	1:54.383	**5**
2	1	(France) Yvan Muller	Chevrolet	Chevrolet Cruze 1.6T		1:55.032	1:54.409	**4**
3	5	(Hungary) Norbert Michelisz	Zengő Motorsport	BMW 320 TC	Y	1:55.243	1:54.523	**3**
4	2	(United Kingdom) Robert Huff	Chevrolet	Chevrolet Cruze 1.6T		1:54.491	1:54.582	**2**
5	32	(United Kingdom) Colin Turkington	Team Aviva-Cofco	Chevrolet Cruze 1.6T		1:55.018	1:54.777	**1**
6	26	(Italy) Stefano D'Aste	Wiechers-Sport	BMW 320 TC	Y	1:55.586	1:55.142	
7	74	(Spain) Pepe Oriola	Tuenti Racing	SEAT León WTCC	Y	1:55.475	1:55.325	
8	11	(United Kingdom) Alex MacDowall	bamboo-engineering	Chevrolet Cruze 1.6T	Y	1:55.467	1:55.378	
9	3	(Italy) Gabriele Tarquini	Lukoil Racing	SEAT León WTCC		1:55.266	1:55.451	
10	15	(Netherlands) **Tom Coronel**	ROAL Motorsport	BMW 320 TC		1:55.246	1:55.720	
11	4	(Russia) Aleksei Dudukalo	Lukoil Racing	SEAT León WTCC	Y	1:55.486	1:55.840	
12	73	(Switzerland) Fredy Barth	SEAT Swiss Racing by SUNRED	SEAT León WTCC	Y	1:55.525	1:56.296	
13	25	(Morocco) Mehdi Bennani	Proteam Racing	BMW 320 TC	Y	1:55.616		
14	20	(China) Darryl O'Young	bamboo-engineering	Chevrolet Cruze 1.6T	Y	1:55.637		
15	14	(United Kingdom) James Nash	Team Aon	Ford Focus S2000 TC		1:55.658		
16	88	(Spain) Fernando Monje	Tuenti Racing	SEAT León WTCC	Y	1:55.734		
17	18	(Portugal) Tiago Monteiro	Honda Racing Team JAS	Honda Civic S2000 TC		1:55.742		
18	7	(Hong Kong) Charles Ng	Liqui Moly Team Engstler	BMW 320 TC	Y	1:55.851		
19	16	(Italy) Alberto Cerqui	ROAL Motorsport	BMW 320 TC	Y	1:55.973		
20	22	(United Kingdom) Tom Boardman	Special Tuning Racing	SEAT León WTCC	Y	1:56.012		
21	6	(Germany) Franz Engstler	Liqui Moly Team Engstler	BMW 320 TC	Y	1:56.577		
22	23	(United Kingdom) Tom Chilton	Team Aon	Ford Focus S2000 TC		1:56.904		
23	60	(France) Hugo Valente	SUNRED Engineering	SR León 1.6T	Y	1:57.947		
24	54	(Hong Kong) Eric Kwong	Look Fong Racing Team	Chevrolet Cruze LT	Y	1:59.352		
25	53	(Macau) Kelvin Leong	Son Veng Racing Team	Honda Accord Euro R	Y	2:00.864		
26	51	(Macau) Kin Veng Ng	China Dragon Racing	Chevrolet Cruze LT	Y	2:00.969		
27	50	(Macau) Felipe De Souza	China Dragon Racing	Chevrolet Lacetti	Y	2:01.059		
107% time: 2:02.505
—	76	(Macau) Alex Liu	Liqui Moly Team Engstler	BMW 320si	Y	2:04.374		

- **Bold** denotes Pole position for second race.

=== Race 1 ===
Pos.	No.	Name	Team	Car	C	Laps	Time/Retired	Grid	Points
1	8	(Switzerland) **Alain Menu**	Chevrolet	Chevrolet Cruze 1.6T		13	25:12.369	1	25
2	2	(United Kingdom) Robert Huff	Chevrolet	Chevrolet Cruze 1.6T		13	+1.500	4	18
3	26	(Italy) Stefano D'Aste	Wiechers-Sport	BMW 320 TC	Y	13	+11.192	6	15
4	15	(Netherlands) Tom Coronel	ROAL Motorsport	BMW 320 TC		13	+13.327	10	12
5	3	(Italy) Gabriele Tarquini	Lukoil Racing	SEAT León WTCC		13	+15.653	9	10
6	32	(United Kingdom) Colin Turkington	Team Aviva-Cofco	Chevrolet Cruze 1.6T		13	+30.125	5	8
7	16	(Italy) Alberto Cerqui	ROAL Motorsport	BMW 320 TC	Y	13	+31.463	19	6
8	25	(Morocco) Mehdi Bennani	Proteam Racing	BMW 320 TC	Y	13	+40.183	13	4
9	6	(Germany) Franz Engstler	Liqui Moly Team Engstler	BMW 320 TC	Y	13	+40.320	21	2
10	7	(Hong Kong) Charles Ng	Liqui Moly Team Engstler	BMW 320 TC	Y	13	+44.499	18	1
11	23	(United Kingdom) Tom Chilton	Team Aon	Ford Focus S2000 TC		13	+46.076	22	
12	22	(United Kingdom) Tom Boardman	Special Tuning Racing	SEAT León WTCC	Y	13	+56.382	20	
13	18	(Portugal) Tiago Monteiro	Honda Racing Team JAS	Honda Civic S2000 TC		13	+1:00.032	17	
14	73	(Switzerland) Fredy Barth	SEAT Swiss Racing by SUNRED	SEAT León WTCC	Y	13	+1:06.426	12	
15	5	(Hungary) Norbert Michelisz	Zengő Motorsport	BMW 320 TC	Y	13	+1:07.550	3	
16	60	(France) Hugo Valente	SUNRED Engineering	SR León 1.6T	Y	13	+1:17.406	23	
17	53	(Macau) Kelvin Leong	Son Veng Racing Team	Honda Accord Euro R	Y	13	+1:21.551	25	
18	54	(Hong Kong) Eric Kwong	Look Fong Racing Team	Chevrolet Cruze LT	Y	13	+1:25.129	24	
19	50	(Macau) Felipe De Souza	China Dragon Racing	Chevrolet Lacetti	Y	13	+1:27.186	27	
20	51	(Macau) Kin Veng Ng	China Dragon Racing	Chevrolet Cruze LT	Y	13	+1:37.603	26	
21	76	(Macau) Alex Liu	Liqui Moly Team Engstler	BMW 320si	Y	12	+1 Lap	28	
22	74	(Spain) Pepe Oriola	Tuenti Racing	SEAT León WTCC	Y	9	+4 Laps	7	
Ret	88	(Spain) Fernando Monje	Tuenti Racing	SEAT León WTCC	Y	8	Race incident	16	
Ret	14	(United Kingdom) James Nash	Team Aon	Ford Focus S2000 TC		7	Engine	15	
Ret	20	(China) Darryl O'Young	bamboo-engineering	Chevrolet Cruze 1.6T	Y	6	Race Incident	14	
NC	4	(Russia) Aleksei Dudukalo	Lukoil Racing	SEAT León WTCC	Y	6	+7 Laps	11	
NC	11	(United Kingdom) Alex MacDowall	bamboo-engineering	Chevrolet Cruze 1.6T	Y	4	+9 Laps	8	
Ret	1	(France) Yvan Muller	Chevrolet	Chevrolet Cruze 1.6T		1	Race incident	2	

- **Bold** denotes Fastest lap.

=== Race 2 ===
Pos.	No.	Name	Team	Car	C	Laps	Time/Retired	Grid	Points
1	2	(United Kingdom) **Robert Huff**	Chevrolet	Chevrolet Cruze 1.6T		13	25:17.714	7	25
2	8	(Switzerland) Alain Menu	Chevrolet	Chevrolet Cruze 1.6T		13	+2.698	10	18
3	15	(Netherlands) Tom Coronel	ROAL Motorsport	BMW 320 TC		13	+4.378	1	15
4	26	(Italy) Stefano D'Aste	Wiechers-Sport	BMW 320 TC	Y	13	+4.866	5	12
5	25	(Morocco) Mehdi Bennani	Proteam Racing	BMW 320 TC	Y	13	+5.574	13	10
6	3	(Italy) Gabriele Tarquini	Lukoil Racing	SEAT León WTCC		13	+20.406	2	8
7	32	(United Kingdom) Colin Turkington	Team Aviva-Cofco	Chevrolet Cruze 1.6T		13	+25.189	6	6
8	22	(United Kingdom) Tom Boardman	Special Tuning Racing	SEAT León WTCC	Y	13	+26.741	20	4
9	16	(Italy) Alberto Cerqui	ROAL Motorsport	BMW 320 TC	Y	13	+27.167	19	2
10	18	(Portugal) Tiago Monteiro	Honda Racing Team JAS	Honda Civic S2000 TC		13	+27.342	17	1
11	4	(Russia) Aleksei Dudukalo	Lukoil Racing	SEAT León WTCC	Y	13	+28.113	11	
12	20	(China) Darryl O'Young	bamboo-engineering	Chevrolet Cruze 1.6T	Y	13	+30.937	14	
13	1	(France) Yvan Muller	Chevrolet	Chevrolet Cruze 1.6T		13	+31.195	9	
14	73	(Switzerland) Fredy Barth	SEAT Swiss Racing by SUNRED	SEAT León WTCC	Y	13	+32.626	12	
15	6	(Germany) Franz Engstler	Liqui Moly Team Engstler	BMW 320 TC	Y	13	+35.170	21	
16	88	(Spain) Fernando Monje	Tuenti Racing	SEAT León WTCC	Y	13	+35.249	16	
17	11	(United Kingdom) Alex MacDowall	bamboo-engineering	Chevrolet Cruze 1.6T	Y	13	+35.368	3	
18	60	(France) Hugo Valente	SUNRED Engineering	SR León 1.6T	Y	13	+41.675	23	
19	23	(United Kingdom) Tom Chilton	Team Aon	Ford Focus S2000 TC		13	+42.220	22	
20	54	(Hong Kong) Eric Kwong	Look Fong Racing Team	Chevrolet Cruze LT	Y	13	+1:15.910	24	
21	50	(Macau) Felipe De Souza	China Dragon Racing	Chevrolet Lacetti	Y	13	+1:21.126	27	
22	51	(Macau) Kin Veng Ng	China Dragon Racing	Chevrolet Cruze LT	Y	13	+1:34.329	26	
23	7	(Hong Kong) Charles Ng	Liqui Moly Team Engstler	BMW 320 TC	Y	12	+1 Lap	18	
24	5	(Hungary) Norbert Michelisz	Zengő Motorsport	BMW 320 TC	Y	12	+1 Lap	8	
25	76	(Macau) Alex Liu	Liqui Moly Team Engstler	BMW 320si	Y	11	+2 Laps	28	
Ret	53	(Macau) Kelvin Leong	Son Veng Racing Team	Honda Accord Euro R	Y	7	Technical	25	
Ret	74	(Spain) Pepe Oriola	Tuenti Racing	SEAT León WTCC	Y	6	Technical	4	
Ret	14	(United Kingdom) James Nash	Team Aon	Ford Focus S2000 TC		0	Engine	15	

- **Bold** denotes Fastest lap.

== Standings after the round ==
Drivers' Championship standings

	Pos	Driver	Points
1	1	(United Kingdom) Robert Huff	390
1	2	(Switzerland) Alain Menu	355
2	3	(France) Yvan Muller	349
	4	(Italy) Gabriele Tarquini	236
	5	(Netherlands) Tom Coronel	196

Yokohama Independents' Trophy standings

Pos	Driver	Points
1	(Hungary) Norbert Michelisz	138
2	(Spain) Pepe Oriola	126
3	(Italy) Stefano D'Aste	122
4	(United Kingdom) Alex MacDowall	95
5	(Germany) Franz Engstler	82

Manufacturers' Championship standings

Pos	Manufacturer	Points
1	(United States) Chevrolet	930
2	(Germany) BMW Customer Racing Teams	602
3	(Spain) SEAT Racing Technology	569

- Note: Only the top five positions are included for both sets of drivers' standings.
