= Kin Veng Ng =

Macanese racing driver

- Nationality: Macanese
- Born: 12 September 1968 (age 58) Portuguese Macau

Macau Touring Car Championship career
- Debut season: 2009
- Current team: Sony Kinetic Energy Team
- Car number: 9
- Best finish: 2nd in 2013

Previous series
- 2012–13 2002, 06, 08: WTCC; ATCC

Kin Veng Ng (born 12 September 1968) is a Macanese racing driver currently competing in the Macau Touring Car Championship. He is a former World Touring Car Championship driver, who made his debut in 2012.

== Racing career ==
Ng began his career in 2002 in the Asian Touring Car Championship, he raced in the championship for several seasons. In 2012, Ng made his World Touring Car Championship debut with China Dragon Racing driving a Chevrolet Cruze LT in the last two rounds in China and Macau. In October 2013, it was announced that he would race in the last three rounds in Japan, China and Macau.

== Racing record ==
=== Complete World Touring Car Championship results ===
(key) (Races in bold indicate pole position – 1 point awarded just in first race; races in italics indicate fastest lap – 1 point awarded all races; * signifies that driver led race for at least one lap – 1 point given all races)

Year	Team	Car	1	2	3	4	5	6	7	8	9	10	11	12	13	14	15	16	17	18	19	20	21	22	23	24	DC	Pts
2012	China Dragon Racing	Chevrolet Cruze LT	ITA; 1	ITA; 2	ESP; 1	ESP; 2	MAR; 1	MAR; 2	SVK; 1	SVK; 2	HUN; 1	HUN; 2	AUT; 1	AUT; 2	POR; 1	POR; 2	BRA; 1	BRA; 2	USA; 1	USA; 2	JPN; 1	JPN; 2	CHN; 1; 20	CHN; 2; 22	MAC; 1 Ret	MAC; 2; 17	NC	0
2013	China Dragon Racing	Chevrolet Cruze LT	ITA; 1	ITA; 2	MAR; 1	MAR; 2	SVK; 1	SVK; 2	HUN; 1	HUN; 2	AUT; 1	AUT; 2	RUS; 1	RUS; 2	POR; 1	POR; 2	ARG; 1	ARG; 2	USA; 1	USA; 2	JPN; 1; 22	JPN; 2; 20	CHN; 1; 26	CHN; 2; 26	MAC; 1; 22	MAC; 2; 11	NC	0
