= Rodolfo Ávila =

Macanese racing driver (born 1987)

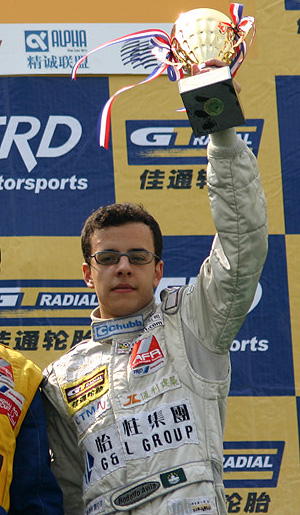
- Nationality: (Macau) Macanese
- Born: 19 February 1987 (age 39) Lisbon, Portugal

TCR China Touring Car Championship career
- Debut season: 2019
- Current team: Team MG X Power
- Categorisation: FIA Gold (until 2015); FIA Silver (2016–)
- Car number: 20
- Former teams: Team Jebsen; Asia Racing Team; Performance Racing

Previous series
- 2003-2004 2008 2009-2011: Asian Formula Renault Challenge; Porsche Carrera Cup Asia; GT3 Asia

Championship titles
- 2003 2008 2021: Asian Formula Renault Challenge; GT3 Asia; TCR China Touring Car Championship

Rodolfo Ávila (born 19 February 1987 in Lisbon, Portugal) is a Macanese racing driver. He is the 2021 TCR China champion, having won it with Team MG Xpower.

== Career ==
- 2002: Champion - Intercontinental A (Gr. B) Macau Karting
- 2003: Champion - Asian Formula Renault Challenge, Champion – China Formula Renault Challenge, 2nd Intercontinental A (Gr. A) Macau Karting
- 2004: Debut in Formula 3 (Macau Grand Prix), 2nd Asian Formula Renault Challenge
- 2005: 5th Asian Formula 3 Championship (1st Rookie), 16th Macau Grand Prix F3 Race, Fastest lap among Macau drivers in the Formula 3 Macau Grand Prix, finishing in 16th overall
- 2006: 4th British Formula Three Championship – National Class
- 2007: International Formula Master – Team's Champion, 1st of Macau Drivers in Macau Grand Prix F3 Race
- 2008: Champion - Asia SuperCar Challenge (ASCC)
- 2009: 4th Porsche Carrera Cup Asia
- 2010: 4th Porsche Carrera Cup Asia
- 2011: 2nd Porsche Carrera Cup Asia
- 2019: TCR China Championship
- 2020: TCR China Championship - Runner's Up
- 2021: TCR China Championship - Champion
