= Filipe de Souza =

Macanese racing driver

Filipe Clemente de Souza
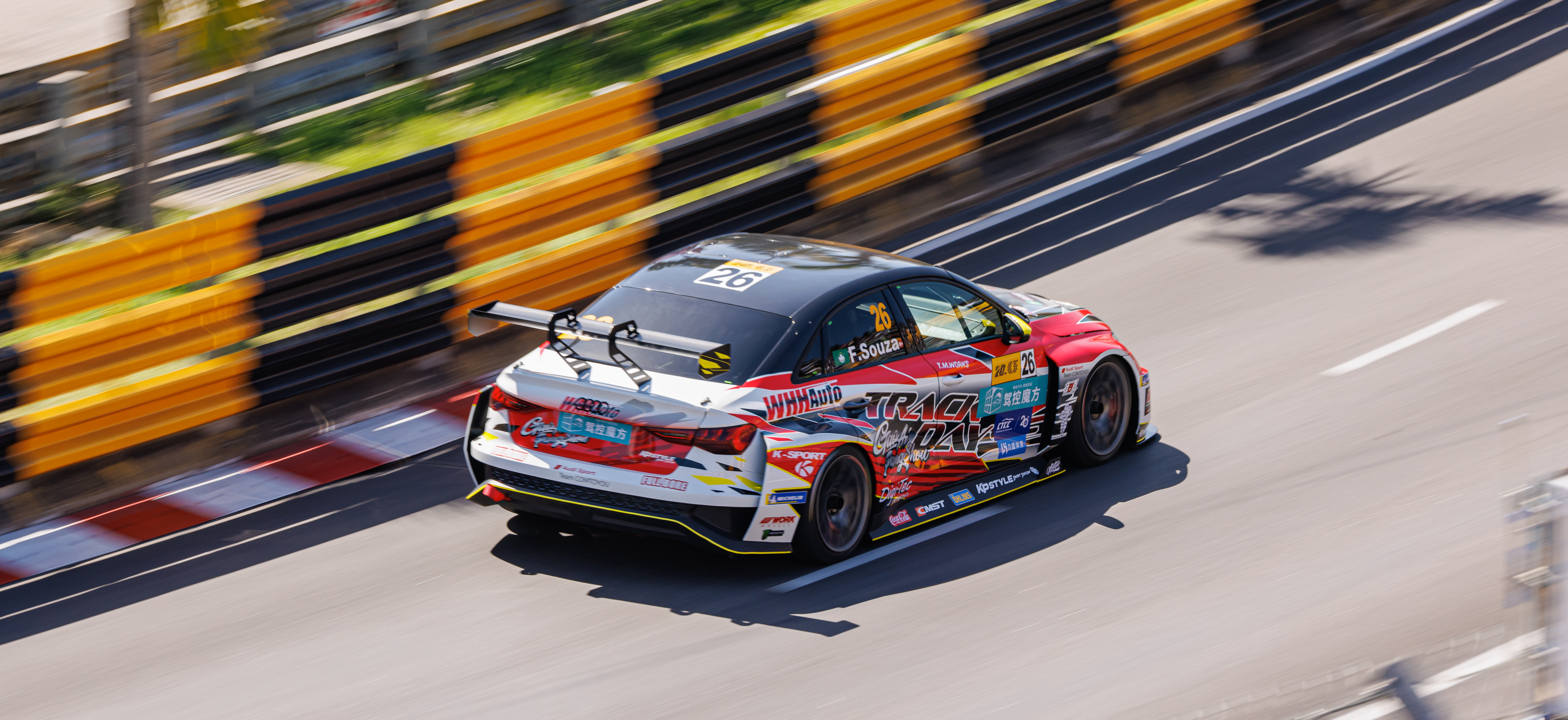
- De Souza in 2023
- Nationality: Macanese
- Born: 26 October 1976 (age 50) Macau

World Touring Car Championship career
- Debut season: 2011
- Current team: RC Motorsport
- Car number: 26
- Former teams: Liqui Moly Team Engstler, Corsa Motorsport, China Dragon Racing
- Starts: 24
- Wins: 0
- Poles: 0
- Fastest laps: 0
- Best finish: 17th in 2017

Filipe Clemente de Souza (born 26 October 1976) is a Macanese race driver.

De Souza has competed in the Macau Hotel Fortuna Trophy from 2000 to 2003 with a best finish of fourth in 2003. Since 2003, he has been competing in the Macau Touring Car Championship with a best placing of third in 2009. In 2011, he competed in the World Touring Car Championship driving for Corsa Motorsport.

== Career results ==
=== Complete World Touring Car Championship results ===
(key) (Races in bold indicate pole position) (Races in italics indicate fastest lap)

Year	Team	Car	1	2	3	4	5	6	7	8	9	10	11	12	13	14	15	16	17	18	19	20	21	22	23	24	DC	Points
2011	Corsa Motorsport	Chevrolet Lacetti	BRA; 1	BRA; 2	BEL; 1	BEL; 2	ITA; 1	ITA; 2	HUN; 1	HUN; 2	CZE; 1	CZE; 2	POR; 1	POR; 2	GBR; 1	GBR; 2	GER; 1	GER; 2	ESP; 1	ESP; 2	JPN; 1	JPN; 2	CHN; 1	CHN; 2	MAC; 1; 15	MAC; 2 Ret	NC	0
2012	China Dragon Racing	Chevrolet Lacetti	ITA; 1	ITA; 2	ESP; 1	ESP; 2	MAR; 1	MAR; 2	SVK; 1	SVK; 2	HUN; 1	HUN; 2	AUT; 1	AUT; 2	POR; 1	POR; 2	BRA; 1	BRA; 2	USA; 1	USA; 2	JPN; 1	JPN; 2	CHN; 1; 19	CHN; 2; 21	MAC; 1; 18†	MAC; 2; 14	NC	0
2013	China Dragon Racing	Chevrolet Cruze LT	ITA; 1	ITA; 2	MAR; 1	MAR; 2	SVK; 1	SVK; 2	HUN; 1	HUN; 2	AUT; 1	AUT; 2	RUS; 1	RUS; 2	POR; 1	POR; 2	ARG; 1	ARG; 2	USA; 1	USA; 2	JPN; 1; 21	JPN; 2 Ret	CHN; 1; 22	CHN; 2; 24	MAC; 1; 20	MAC; 2; 15	NC	0
2014	Liqui Moly Team Engstler	BMW 320 TC	MAR; 1	MAR; 2	FRA; 1	FRA; 2	HUN; 1	HUN; 2	SVK; 1	SVK; 2	AUT; 1	AUT; 2	RUS; 1	RUS; 2	BEL; 1	BEL; 2	ARG; 1	ARG; 2	BEI; 1; 14	BEI; 2 Ret	CHN; 1; 16	CHN; 2; 16	JPN; 1 Ret	JPN; 2; 15	MAC; 1; 17	MAC; 2; 13	NC	0
2017	RC Motorsport	Lada Vesta WTCC	MAR; 1	MAR; 2	ITA; 1	ITA; 2	HUN; 1	HUN; 2	GER; 1	GER; 2	POR; 1	POR; 2	ARG; 1	ARG; 2	CHN; 1; 6	CHN; 2; 10‡	JPN; 1; 16	JPN; 2; 15	MAC; 1	MAC; 2	QAT; 1	QAT; 2					17th	8.5

^{‡} Half points awarded as less than 75% of race distance was completed.

=== Complete TCR Asia Series results ===
(key) (Races in bold indicate pole position) (Races in italics indicate fastest lap)

Year	Team	Car	1	2	3	4	5	6	7	8	9	DC	Points
2015	Roadstar Racing	SEAT León Cup Racer	MYS; 1; 8†	MYS; 2; 4	MYS; 3 Ret	SIN; 1 Ret	SIN; 2; 5	THA; 1	THA; 2	MAC; 1	MAC; 2	10th*	26*

=== Complete TCR International Series results ===
(key) (Races in bold indicate pole position) (Races in italics indicate fastest lap)

Year	Team	Car	1	2	3	4	5	6	7	8	9	10	11	12	13	14	15	16	17	18	19	20	21	22	DC	Points
2015	Roadstar Racing	SEAT León Cup Racer	SEP; 1	SEP; 2	SHA; 1	SHA; 2	VAL; 1	VAL; 2	ALG; 1	ALG; 2	MNZ; 1	MNZ; 2	SAL; 1	SAL; 2	SOC; 1	SOC; 2	RBR; 1	RBR; 2	MRN; 1 Ret	MRN; 2; 16	CHA; 1; 14	CHA; 2; 12	MAC; 1	MAC; 2	NC	0
2016	Liqui Moly Team Engstler	Volkswagen Golf GTI TCR	BHR; 1	BHR; 2	EST; 1	EST; 2	SPA; 1	SPA; 2	IMO; 1	IMO; 2	SAL; 1	SAL; 2	OSC; 1	OSC; 2	SOC; 1	SOC; 2	CHA; 1	CHA; 2	MRN; 1 Ret	MRN; 2; 13	SEP; 1; 14	SEP; 2; 15	MAC; 1	MAC; 2	NC	0

=== Complete World Touring Car Cup results ===
(key) (Races in bold indicate pole position) (Races in italics indicate fastest lap)

Year	Team	Car	1	2	3	4	5	6	7	8	9	10	11	12	13	14	15	16	17	18	19	20	21	22	23	24	25	26	27	28	29	30	DC	Points
2018	Champ Motorsport	Audi RS 3 LMS TCR	MAR; 1	MAR; 2	MAR; 3	HUN; 1	HUN; 2	HUN; 3	GER; 1	GER; 2	GER; 3	NED; 1	NED; 2	NED; 3	POR; 1	POR; 2	POR; 3	SVK; 1	SVK; 2	SVK; 3	CHN; 1	CHN; 2	CHN; 3	WUH; 1	WUH; 2	WUH; 3	JPN; 1	JPN; 2	JPN; 3	MAC; 1; 17	MAC; 2; 19	MAC; 3; 19	39th	0

=== TCR Spa 500 results ===
Year	Team	Co-Drivers	Car	Class	Laps	Pos.	Class Pos.
2019	Macau PS Racing	(Macau) Louis Ng (Macau) Kelvin Wong (Macau) Ryan Wong (Macau) Lam Kam San	Audi RS 3 LMS TCR	**Am**	85	DNF/Crash damage	DNF/Crash damage
