= James Tang =

Hong Kong racing driver

- Nationality: Hong Kong SAR, People's Republic of China
- Born: 15 July 1975 (age 51) Hong Kong

TCR International Series career
- Debut season: 2016
- Current team: Team TRC
- Car number: 68
- Starts: 1

Previous series
- 2016–17 2015-16 2005-07 2003-04, 07-08: Asian Le Mans Series; Red Bull Drift Battle; ZIC Drifting; Hong Kong Touring Car Championship

"James" Tang Chi Lun (born 15 July 1975) is a Hong Kong racing driver currently competing in the TCR International Series. He competed in the Asian Le Mans Series and Hong Kong Touring Car Championship.

== Racing career ==
Tang began his career in 2003 in the Hong Kong Touring Car Championship, he raced there for two seasons, before starting his career in drifting. After drifting for a few years, he returned to the Hong Kong Touring Car Championship for two seasons. He took part in the REd Bull Drift Battle in 2015 and 2016, finishing within the top-ten in both years. He switched to the Asian Le Mans Series for the 2016–17 season.

In November 2016, it was announced that Tang would race in the TCR International Series, driving a Honda Civic TCR for Team TRC.

== Racing record ==
=== Complete TCR International Series results ===
(key) (Races in bold indicate pole position) (Races in italics indicate fastest lap)

| Year | Team | Car | 1 | 2 | 3 | 4 | 5 | 6 | 7 | 8 | 9 | 10 | 11 | 12 | 13 | 14 | 15 | 16 | 17 | 18 | 19 | 20 | 21 | 22 | DC | Points |
|---|---|---|---|---|---|---|---|---|---|---|---|---|---|---|---|---|---|---|---|---|---|---|---|---|---|---|
| 2016 | Team TRC | Honda Civic TCR | BHR; 1 | BHR; 2 | POR; 1 | POR; 2 | BEL; 1 | BEL; 2 | ITA; 1 | ITA; 2 | AUT; 1 | AUT; 2 | GER; 1 | GER; 2 | RUS; 1 | RUS; 2 | THA; 1 | THA; 2 | SIN; 1 | SIN; 2 | MYS; 1 | MYS; 2 | MAC; 1 Ret | MAC; 2 DNS | NC | 0 |

^{†} Driver did not finish the race, but was classified as he completed over 90% of the race distance.
