= Liu Lic Ka =

Macau racing driver

Liu Lic Ka 廖力嘉
- Nationality: Macanese
- Born: 18 March 1971 (age 55) Hong Kong

Previous series
- 2021–2022 2021: GT Super Sprint Challenge; China Endurance Championship

Championship titles
- 2023: Macau GT Challenge

"Alex" Liu Lic Ka (Chinese: 廖力嘉, born March 18, 1971, in Hong Kong) is an auto racing driver from Macau. Liu is the champion of the 2023 Macau GT Challenge.

== Racing career ==
Liu has competed mainly in touring car racing in Asia, regularly competing in the support races at the Macau Grand Prix. He made his World Touring Car Championship debut at the 2009 FIA WTCC Race of Macau, driving for Liqui Moly Team Engstler alongside compatriots Henry Ho and Joe Rosa Merszei. He returned to the WTCC again in 2012, driving a BMW 320si for Liqui Moly Team Engstler at the Race of China.

Liu competed in the Macau GT Challenge of the 2023 Macau Touring Car Series and claimed the championship title.

== Racing record ==
=== Complete World Touring Car Championship results ===
(key) (Races in bold indicate pole position) (Races in italics indicate fastest lap)

Year	Team	Car	1	2	3	4	5	6	7	8	9	10	11	12	13	14	15	16	17	18	19	20	21	22	23	24	DC	Points
2009	Liqui Moly Team Engstler	BMW 320si	BRA; 1	BRA; 2	MEX; 1	MEX; 2	MAR; 1	MAR; 2	FRA; 1	FRA; 2	ESP; 1	ESP; 2	CZE; 1	CZE; 2	POR; 1	POR; 2	GBR; 1	GBR; 2	GER; 1	GER; 1	ITA; 1	ITA; 2	JPN; 1	JPN; 2	MAC; 1; 24	MAC; 2 DNS	NC	0
2012	Liqui Moly Team Engstler	BMW 320si	ITA; 1	ITA; 2	ESP; 1	ESP; 2	MAR; 1	MAR; 2	SVK; 1	SVK; 2	HUN; 1	HUN; 2	AUT; 1	AUT; 2	POR; 1	POR; 2	BRA; 1	BRA; 2	USA; 1	USA; 2	JPN; 1	JPN; 2	CHN; 1; 21	CHN; 2; 25	MAC; 1	MAC; 2	NC	0

=== Complete GT4 European Series results ===
(key) (Races in bold indicate pole position) (Races in italics indicate fastest lap)

Year	Team	Car	Class	1	2	3	4	5	6	7	8	9	10	11	12	Pos	Points
2023	Newbridge Motorsport	Aston Martin Vantage AMR GT4	Pro-Am	MNZ; 1	MNZ; 2	LEC; 1	LEC; 2	SPA; 1; 50	SPA; 2; 41	MIS; 1	MIS; 2	HOC; 1	HOC; 2	CAT; 1	CAT; 2	NC	0

=== Complete Macau Touring Car Series results ===
==== Macau GT Challenge ====
(key) (Races in bold indicate pole position) (Races in italics indicate fastest lap)

Year	Team	1	2	3	4	Pos	Points
2023	Elegant Racing Team	GIC1; 1; 1	GIC1; 2; 1	GIC2; 1	GIC2; 2	1st	40

=== Complete GT World Challenge Asia results ===
(key) (Races in bold indicate pole position) (Races in italics indicate fastest lap)

Year	Team	Car	1	2	3	4	5	6	7	8	9	10	11	12	DC	Points
2024	Elegant Racing Team	Mercedes-AMG GT3 Evo	SEP; 1; 20	SEP; 2 Ret	BUR; 1	BUR; 2	FUJ; 1; 29	FUJ; 2; 27	SUZ; 1	SUZ; 2	OKA; 1	OKA; 2	SHA; 1; 24	SHA; 2 Ret	NC	0
