= Lynk & Co 03 TCR =

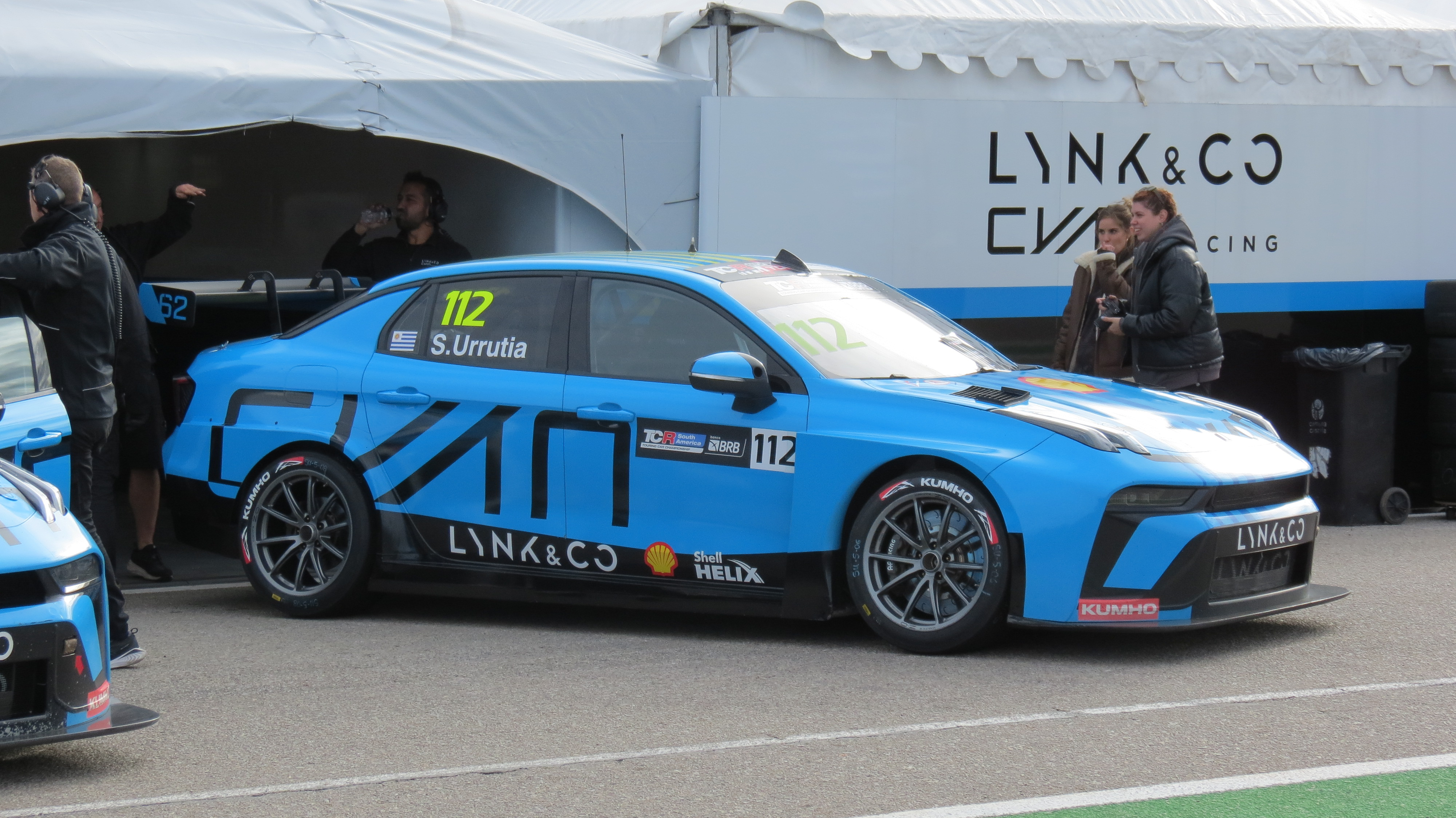
- The Lynk & Co 03 FL TCR of Santiago Urrutia at the 2023 El Pinar TCR World Tour round.
- Category: TCR Touring Car
- Constructor: Cyan Racing
- Designers: Alexander Murdzevski Schedvin (Head, Geely Group Motorsport)
- Predecessor: Volvo S60 Polestar TC1
- Successor: Geely Preface TCR

Technical specifications
- Chassis: Lynk & Co 03
- Engine: Volvo JLH-4G20TD 1,969 cc (120 cu in) 350 hp (261 kW; 355 PS) I4 turbocharged front-mounted, FWD
- Transmission: Xtrac 6-speed Sequential

Competition history
- Debut: 2019 FIA WTCR Race of Morocco

The Lynk & Co 03 TCR is a racing car developed by Cyan Racing, which has also developed Volvo, having won the WTCC in 2017 which, like Lynk & Co, is part of the Geely group. The race car is based on the eponymous Lynk & Co 03.

== History ==
The development was carried out in Changzhou, In October 2018, it was confirmed that the car was to be launched at the World Touring Car Cup (WTCR) in 2019, making it the first Chinese brand to be featured in an FIA championship.

The car was first tested in November 2018 by Thed Björk in Sweden and Portugal. By 2019, Cyan focused exclusively on the WTCR and only used these cars there. In September 2019, however, it was announced that customers would also be able to order the cars. By 2020, the Shell Teamwork team had purchased the 03 TCRs for the TCR China Touring Car Championship, and by 2021, MA:GP had also purchased the vehicles for the Scandinavian Touring Car Championship, and it had also made its debut in the newly formed TCR South America Touring Car Championship. Also in Summer 2021, a special street version, called the Lynk & Co 03+ Cyan Edition, was released in honor of the car's success in racing.

Cyan Racing withdrew all five cars from the 2022 FIA WTCR Race of Italy, citing tire safety concerns regarding the series's Goodyear tires. The teams would ultimately pull out of the WTCR in August 2022 for the same reason.
