= Teamwork Motorsport =

Chinese auto racing team

Teamwork Motorsport 捷凱車隊 is a racing team which was founded in Hong Kong in 1999. The team works with engineers and engineers from all around the world, with drivers such as 2012 WTCC champion Rob Huff and double-BTCC champion Colin Turkington having been part of the team’s success.

Teamwork Motorsport races both under its own name, as well as provides consultancy and technical expertise to other racing programmes. In recent years, Teamwork has had a major presence in high-profile championships such as the CTCC (China Touring Car Championship), the HTCC (Hong Kong Touring Car Championship), the TCR China Touring Car Championship, the TCR Asia Series, the China GT Championship and the world-famous Macau Grand Prix.

Teamwork Motorsport has won multiple team's & driver's titles and race wins in these series. It is the only Asia race team to win seven CTM Cup Wins in Macau GP in the past twelve years.

On 21 November 2020, at the Guia Race of Macau, Ma Qing Hua, driving for Shell Teamwork Lynk & Co Motorsport, finished second in the qualifying race of the 2020 TCR China Touring Car Championship season finale, thus securing the drivers’ title.
