= Lam Kam San =

- Nationality: (Macau) Macanese
- Born: 10 May 1971 (age 55) Portuguese Macau

Previous series
- 2013 2004-08, 11 2002: WTCC; Asian Formula Renault Series; Asian Touring Car Series

Lam Kam San (Chinese: 林錦新, born 10 May 1971) is a Macanese racing driver previously competing in the World Touring Car Championship driver, where he made his debut in 2013.

== Racing career ==
Lam began his career in 2002 in the Asian Touring Car Series. In 2004, he switched to the Asian Formula Renault Series. In 2013, Lam made his World Touring Car Championship debut with China Dragon Racing driving a Chevrolet Lacetti in the last round in Macau. Lam participated in the season finale of the 2018 World Touring Car Cup at the Guia Circuit in Macau for Champ Motorsport but failed to qualify for all three races.

== Racing record ==
=== Complete World Touring Car Championship results ===
(key) (Races in bold indicate pole position – 1 point awarded just in first race; races in italics indicate fastest lap – 1 point awarded all races; * signifies that driver led race for at least one lap – 1 point given all races)

Year	Team	Car	1	2	3	4	5	6	7	8	9	10	11	12	13	14	15	16	17	18	19	20	21	22	23	24	DC	Pts
2013	China Dragon Racing	Chevrolet Lacetti	ITA; 1	ITA; 2	MAR; 1	MAR; 2	SVK; 1	SVK; 2	HUN; 1	HUN; 2	AUT; 1	AUT; 2	RUS; 1	RUS; 2	POR; 1	POR; 2	ARG; 1	ARG; 2	USA; 1	USA; 2	JPN; 1	JPN; 2	CHN; 1	CHN; 2	MAC; 1; 26	MAC; 2; 12	NC	0

=== Complete World Touring Car Cup results ===
(key) (Races in bold indicate pole position) (Races in italics indicate fastest lap)

Year	Team	Car	1	2	3	4	5	6	7	8	9	10	11	12	13	14	15	16	17	18	19	20	21	22	23	24	25	26	27	28	29	30	DC	Points
2018	Champ Motorsport	Audi RS 3 LMS TCR	MAR; 1	MAR; 2	MAR; 3	HUN; 1	HUN; 2	HUN; 3	GER; 1	GER; 2	GER; 3	NED; 1	NED; 2	NED; 3	POR; 1	POR; 2	POR; 3	SVK; 1	SVK; 2	SVK; 3	CHN; 1	CHN; 2	CHN; 3	WUH; 1	WUH; 2	WUH; 3	JPN; 1	JPN; 2	JPN; 3	MAC; 1 DNQ	MAC; 2 DNQ	MAC; 3 DNQ	NC	0

=== TCR Spa 500 results ===
Year	Team	Co-Drivers	Car	Class	Laps	Pos.	Class Pos.
2019	Macau PS Racing	(Macau) Filipe de Souza (Macau) Louis Ng (Macau) Kelvin Wong (Macau) Ryan Wong	Audi RS 3 LMS TCR	**Am**	85	DNF/Crash damage	DNF/Crash damage
