= Masaki Kano =

Japanese racing driver

- Nationality: (Japan) Japanese
- Born: 4 February 1976 (age 50) Osaka, Japan

Super GT career
- Debut season: 2012
- Current team: R'Qs Motor Sports
- Car number: 22
- Former teams: JLOC, Arnage Racing
- Starts: 69
- Wins: 0
- Podiums: 1
- Poles: 0
- Fastest laps: 0
- Best finish: 15th in 2013

Previous series
- 2007–08 2008–13: ATCS; WTCC

GT World Challenge Asia career
- Debut season: 2023
- Current team: YZ Racing with BMW Team Studie
- Car number: 50
- Championships: 1 (GT4) (2023)
- Wins: 6 (GT4)

Masaki Kano (加納 政樹, Kanō Masaki; born 4 February 1976 in Osaka) is a Japanese auto racing driver who currently races in the Super GT racing series. He is best known for having competed in the World Touring Car Championship.

Kano won the GT World Challenge Asia GT4 class championship in 2023 racing for YZ Racing with BMW Team Studie.

== Career ==
Kano competed in karting between 1991 and 1994. He then attended the Winfield Racing School in France in 1995.

Kano finished ninth in the Japanese Super Taikyu Series in 2006, and later third in 2007.

=== Asian Touring Car Series ===
From 2007 to 2008, Kano competed in the Asian Touring Car Series. He was runner-up to Fariqe Hairuman in the 2007 Asian Touring Car Championship, driving a BMW 320i for Engstler Motorsport, winning the Division 2 category. The following year, he finished third in the 2008 Asian Touring Car Championship.

=== World Touring Car Championship ===
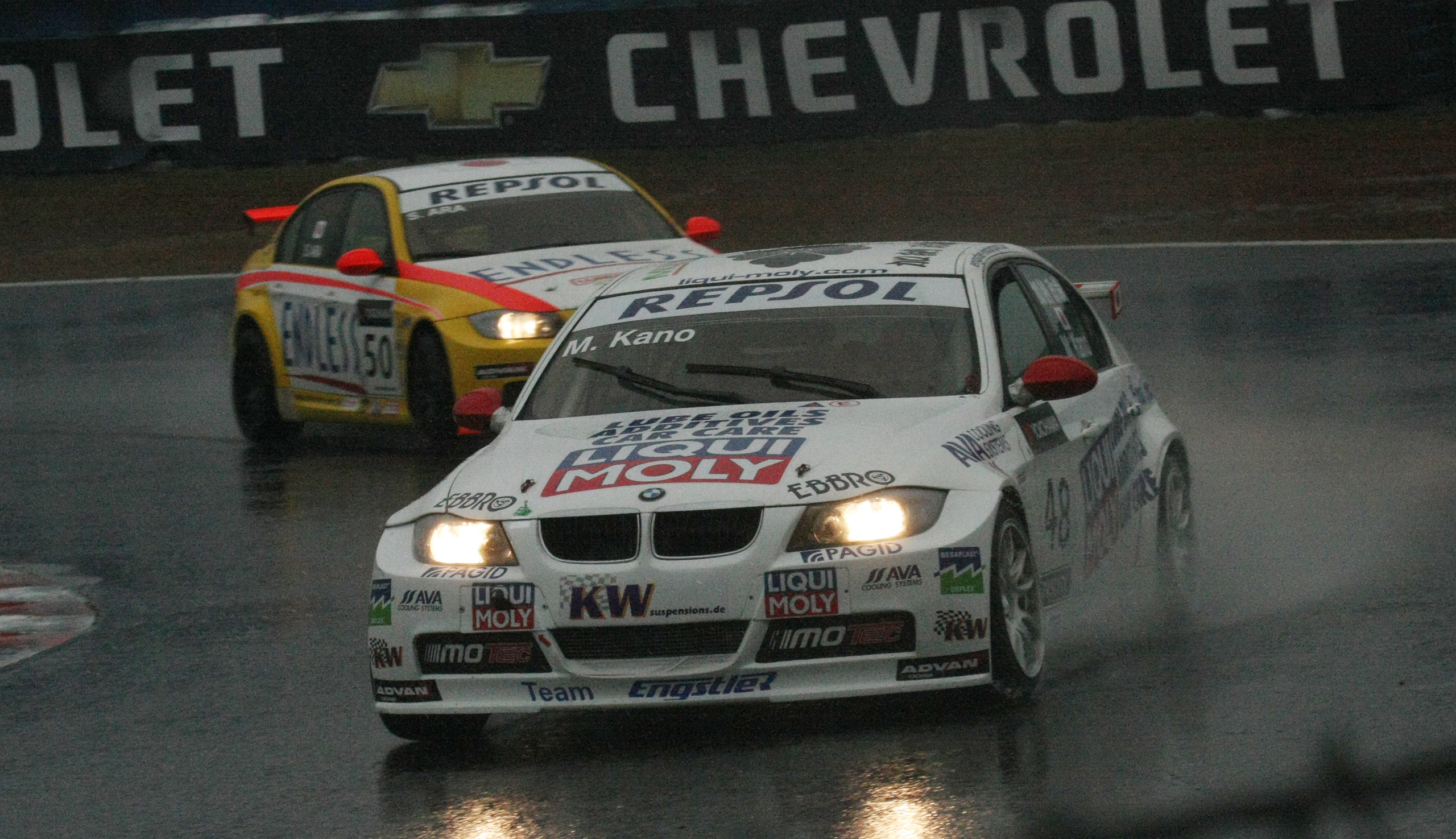
Kano driving for Liqui Moly Team Engstler at the 2009 FIA WTCC Race of Japan.

Kano made his World Touring Car Championship debut for Engstler at the 2008 FIA WTCC Race of Japan; he also raced at the subsequent Race of Macau. He returned to the WTCC for Engstler in the Asian rounds of the 2009, 2010 and 2011 seasons. He joined Engstler Motorsport once again for the 2012 FIA WTCC Race of Japan. For the 2013 FIA WTCC Race of Japan he replaced team boss Franz Engstler, who was unable to race due to illness.

=== Super GT ===
Kano made his debut in the Super GT racing series in the GT300 class in 2012, racing for JLOC. From 2013 to 2022, Kano raced for Arnage Racing. He scored 19 points in 2013 with one podium finish. In 2023, Kano joined R'Qs Motor Sports.

=== GT World Challenge Asia ===
In 2023, Kano participated in the GT World Challenge Asia championship series, driving a BMW M4 GT4 for the YZ Racing with Studie Team alongside Manabu Orido. Kano and the team scored six race wins in the 2023 championship in the GT4 class.

Kano and the YZ Racing with Studie team went on to win the 2023 GT4 class championship, as well as the Japan Cup title for the 2023 season.

== Racing record ==
=== Complete World Touring Car Championship results ===
(key) (Races in bold indicate pole position) (Races in italics indicate fastest lap)

Year	Team	Car	1	2	3	4	5	6	7	8	9	10	11	12	13	14	15	16	17	18	19	20	21	22	23	24	DC	Points
2008	Liqui Moly Team Engstler	BMW 320i	BRA; 1	BRA; 2	MEX; 1	MEX; 2	ESP; 1	ESP; 2	FRA; 1	FRA; 2	CZE; 1	CZE; 2	POR; 1	POR; 2	GBR; 1	GBR; 2	GER; 1	GER; 2	EUR; 1	EUR; 2	ITA; 1	ITA; 2	JPN; 1; 24	JPN; 2; 21	MAC; 1 Ret	MAC; 2 DNS	NC	0
2009	Liqui Moly Team Engstler	BMW 320si	BRA; 1	BRA; 2	MEX; 1	MEX; 2	MAR; 1	MAR; 2	FRA; 1	FRA; 2	ESP; 1	ESP; 2	CZE; 1	CZE; 2	POR; 1	POR; 2	GBR; 1	GBR; 2	GER; 1	GER; 2	ITA; 1	ITA; 2	JPN; 1; 21	JPN; 2; 20	MAC; 1	MAC; 2	NC	0
2010	Liqui Moly Team Engstler	BMW 320si	BRA; 1	BRA; 2	MAR; 1	MAR; 2	ITA; 1	ITA; 2	BEL; 1	BEL; 2	POR; 1	POR; 2	GBR; 1	GBR; 2	CZE; 1	CZE; 2	GER; 1	GER; 2	ESP; 1	ESP; 2	JPN; 1	JPN; 2	MAC; 1; 20	MAC; 2 Ret			NC	0
2011	DeTeam KK Motorsport	BMW 320 TC	BRA; 1	BRA; 2	BEL; 1	BEL; 2	ITA; 1	ITA; 2	HUN; 1	HUN; 2	CZE; 1	CZE; 2	POR; 1	POR; 2	GBR; 1	GBR; 2	GER; 1	GER; 2	ESP; 1	ESP; 2	JPN; 1; 12	JPN; 2; 16	CHN; 1	CHN; 2	MAC; 1	MAC; 2	NC	0
2012	Liqui Moly Team Engstler	BMW 320si	ITA; 1	ITA; 2	ESP; 1	ESP; 2	MAR; 1	MAR; 2	SVK; 1	SVK; 2	HUN; 1	HUN; 2	AUT; 1	AUT; 2	POR; 1	POR; 2	BRA; 1	BRA; 2	USA; 1	USA; 2	JPN; 1; 20	JPN; 2; 21	CHN; 1	CHN; 2	MAC; 1	MAC; 2	NC	0
2013	Liqui Moly Team Engstler	BMW 320 TC	ITA; 1	ITA; 2	MAR; 1	MAR; 2	SVK; 1	SVK; 2	HUN; 1	HUN; 2	AUT; 1	AUT; 2	RUS; 1	RUS; 2	POR; 1	POR; 2	ARG; 1	ARG; 2	USA; 1	USA; 2	JPN; 1; 19	JPN; 2; 15	CHN; 1	CHN; 2	MAC; 1	MAC; 2	NC	0

=== Complete Super GT results ===
Year	Team	Car	Class	1	2	3	4	5	6	7	8	9	DC	Pts
2012	JLOC	Lamborghini Gallardo RG-3	GT300	OKA; 14	FUJ; Ret	SEP	SUG	SUZ	FUJ; 18	AUT	MOT		NC	0
2013	Arnage Racing	Aston Martin V12 Vantage GT3	GT300	OKA; 20	FUJ; Ret	SEP; 20	SUG; 14	SUZ; 8	FUJ; 18	FUJ	AUT; 2	MOT; Ret	15th	19
2014	Arnage Racing	Aston Martin V12 Vantage GT3	GT300	OKA; 13	FUJ; 15	AUT; 8	SUG; 4	FUJ; 16	SUZ; Ret	BUR; 6	MOT; 10		19th	17
2015	Arnage Racing	Mercedes-Benz SLS AMG GT3	GT300	OKA; 18	FUJ; 11	CHA; 14	FUJ; Ret	SUZ; Ret	SUG; 20	AUT; 16	MOT; 22		NC	0
2018	Arnage Racing	Mercedes-AMG GT3	GT300	OKA; 10	FUJ; 20	SUZ; 19	CHA; 13	FUJ; 11	SUG; 17	AUT; 16	MOT; 20		24th	1
2019	Arnage Racing	Mercedes-AMG GT3	GT300	OKA; 22	FUJ; 17	SUZ; 24	CHA; 20	FUJ; 21	AUT; 12	SUG; 16	MOT; 28		NC	0
2020	Arnage Racing	Mercedes-AMG GT3	GT300	FUJ (1); 20	FUJ (2); 24	SUZ (1); 18	MOT (1); 22	FUJ (3); 23	SUZ (2); 23	MOT (2); 21	FUJ (4); 11		NC	0
2021	Arnage Racing	Mercedes-AMG GT3	GT300	OKA; 18	FSW; 21	SUZ; 22	TRM; 19	SUG; 24	AUT; 14	TRM; 21	FSW; DNS		NC	0
2022	Arnage Racing	Toyota 86 MC GT300	GT300	OKA; 16	FUJ; 25	SUZ	FUJ; 7	SUZ; 23	SUG; 22	AUT; 21	MOT		29th	4
2023	R'Qs Motor Sports	Mercedes-AMG GT3 EVO 2020	GT300	OKA	FUJ; 21	SUZ; 26	FUJ; 24	SUZ; 20	SUG	AUT; 21	MOT		NC	0
2024	R'Qs Motor Sports	Mercedes-AMG GT3 EVO 2020	GT300	OKA; 25	FUJ; 25	SUZ	FUJ	SUG	AUT; 23	MOT	SUZ; 23		NC	0
2025	R'Qs Motor Sports	Mercedes-AMG GT3 EVO 2020	GT300	OKA; 25	FUJ; 20	SEP	FS1; 23	FS2 (25)	SUZ; 23	SUG; 17	AUT; 19	MOT; Ret	NC	0
2026	R'Qs Motor Sports	Mercedes-AMG GT3 EVO 2020	GT300	OKA; 25	FUJ; 20	FUJ; 27	SUZ; 25	SUG; DNS	AUT; 22	MOT; 21	MOT; 21		NC	0

* Season still in progress.
