= Aleksey Dudukalo =

Russian auto racing driver

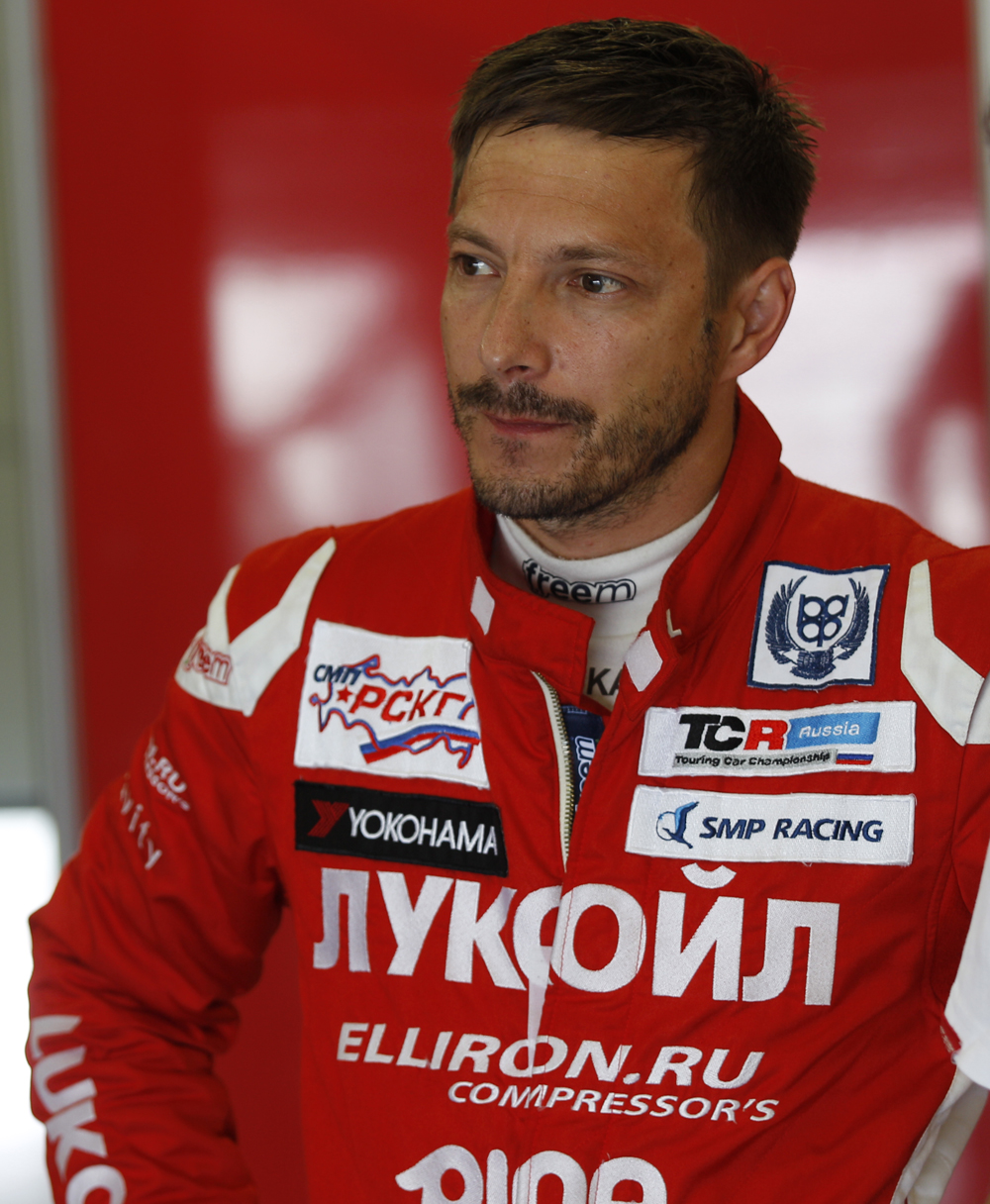
- Nationality: (Russia) Russian
- Born: Aleksey Nikolayevich Dudukalo; 6 October 1976 (age 50) Moscow, Russian SFSR, Soviet Union
- Car number: 11
- Starts: 55
- Wins: 0
- Poles: 1
- Fastest laps: 0

Previous series
- 2011–13 2012 2009–10 2007–09 2004–06 2000, 2004 1999, 2001–03 2002 2000 2000 1995–1998: WTCC; Russian Ice Racing Championship; SEAT León Eurocup; RTCC; Russian Honda Civic Cup; Russian Formula 1600; Supertourism; Formula RUS; Russian Formula 3 Formula Renault 2.0 Italia; Russian Autocross

Championship titles
- 2012 2008–09 2004–06 2003: Russian Ice Racing Championship; RTCC – Touring-Light; Russian Honda Civic Cup; Supertourism

Aleksey Nikolayevich Dudukalo (Russian: Алексе́й Никола́евич Дудука́ло, IPA: [ɐlʲɪkˈsʲej nʲɪkɐˈlajɪvʲɪdʑ dʊdʊˈkalə]; born 6 October 1976) is a Russian auto racing driver. He raced in the World Touring Car Championship between 2011 and 2013.

== Career ==
=== Early years ===
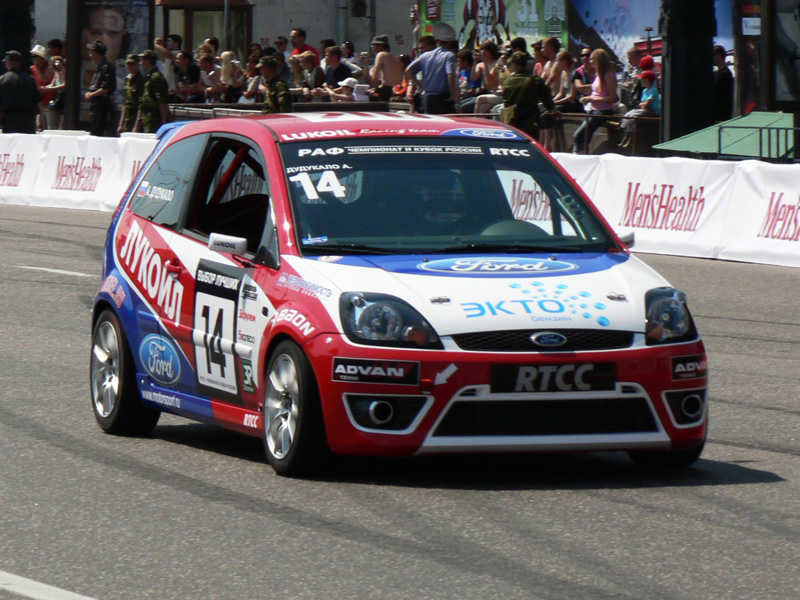
Dudukalo driving Touring-Light Ford Fiesta at Moscow City Racing 2008 show

Dudukalo started his racing career in 1995 in autocross racing. Five years later he switched to single–seaters. Dudukalo competed in Russian Formula 1600, where he was third in 2004 (his best result in open wheel series). He has very successful in the Supertourism/Tourism 1600 (champion in 2003) and the Russian Honda Civic Cup/Super Light Cup (champion in 2004–06), as well as the Touring-Light class of the Russian Touring Car Championship (champion in 2008 and 2009). In 2009, he finished 20th in the SEAT León Eurocup for Rangoni Motorsport. He also competed in the SEAT León Supercopa with the same team. For 2010 Dudukalo switched to Sunred Engineering. He improved to seventh position in standings with a win at Brno.

=== World Touring Car Championship ===
==== Lukoil-SUNRED (2011) ====
In 2011, Dudukalo moved up to the World Touring Car Championship, continuing his collaboration with SUNRED where he was joined by Gabriele Tarquini. He only scored points twice and finished the season 21st in the drivers' standings.

==== Lukoil Racing Team (2012) ====
Dudukalo was retained alongside Tarquini for 2012 with the team now run by Lukoil Racing. He had qualified eighth for the Race of Spain when his SEAT León WTCC caught fire in parc ferme. He qualified a career best second for the Race of Slovakia and finished in that position in race one behind his teammate to complete a Lukoil Racing Team 1–2, Dudukalo was also the Yokohama Independents' Trophy winner. However, race two saw Dudukalo issued with a drive through penalty as all four of his wheels were not on the ground when the five-minute board was shown on the grid. He started on pole position for race two of the Race of Austria but was overtaken at the start by the BMWs of Tom Coronel and Stefano D'Aste. Dudukalo was one of a few drivers who had to pit during the race for fresh tyres due to punctures. He clashed with former SEAT León Eurocup rival Gábor Wéber at the Race of Portugal and went into a gravel trap but both drivers were able to return to the pits. He then clashed with ROAL Motorsport's Alberto Cerqui in race two of the Race of Brazil which caused Cerqui to crash into the pit wall. At the Race of the United States, having made it through to Q2, he beached his car near the end of the first session and brought the red flags out. He was then caught in a pileup at the start of race one which forced him to retire. A clash with Mehdi Bennani in the first race of the Race of Japan earned Dudukalo a 30–second post race penalty. He was classified fifteenth in the drivers' championship although still some way off his teammate.

==== Lukoil Lada Sport (2013) ====
Dudukalo was signed to race alongside James Thompson at Lukoil Lada Sport for 2013. During qualifying for the Race of Italy, Dudukalo missed the braking point for the first chicane and collided with his teammate. Dudukalo was given a five–place grid drop for race one following the collision with Thompson. Lada later withdrew both of their cars prior to the races as neither could be repaired in time to participate. The incident put Dudukalo's seat in doubt with the team considering bringing in a replacement driver. Prior to the Race of Morocco, he was replaced at the team by Mikhail Kozlovskiy.

== Racing record ==
=== Complete World Touring Car Championship results ===
(key) (Races in bold indicate pole position) (Races in italics indicate fastest lap)

Year	Team	Car	1	2	3	4	5	6	7	8	9	10	11	12	13	14	15	16	17	18	19	20	21	22	23	24	DC	Points
2011	Lukoil-SUNRED	SEAT León 2.0 TDI	BRA; 1; 17	BRA; 2; 12	BEL; 1; 12	BEL; 2; 9	ITA; 1 Ret	ITA; 2 Ret	HUN; 1; 16	HUN; 2; 12	CZE; 1; 14	CZE; 2; 13	POR; 1 Ret	POR; 2; 13													21st	4
2011	Lukoil-SUNRED	SUNRED SR León 1.6T													GBR; 1; 15	GBR; 2; 14	GER; 1; 9	GER; 2; 15	ESP; 1; 13	ESP; 2 Ret	JPN; 1; 17	JPN; 2; 12	CHN; 1; 15	CHN; 2; 17	MAC; 1 Ret	MAC; 2 DNS	21st	4
2012	Lukoil Racing Team	SEAT León WTCC	ITA; 1; 18	ITA; 2 DNS	ESP; 1 NC	ESP; 2; 12	MAR; 1; 16	MAR; 2; 11	SVK; 1; 2	SVK; 2; 15	HUN; 1; 14	HUN; 2; 16	AUT; 1; 19	**AUT**; **2**; 14	POR; 1 Ret	POR; 2; 16	BRA; 1; 11	BRA; 2; 10	USA; 1 Ret	USA; 2; 18	JPN; 1; 18	JPN; 2; 8	CHN; 1 NC	CHN; 2; 11	MAC; 1; 11	MAC; 2; 7	15th	33
2013	Lukoil Lada Sport	Lada Granta	ITA; 1 DNS	ITA; 2 DNS	MAR; 1	MAR; 2	SVK; 1	SVK; 2	HUN; 1	HUN; 2	AUT; 1	AUT; 2	RUS; 1	RUS; 2	POR; 1	POR; 2	ARG; 1	ARG; 2	USA; 1	USA; 2	JPN; 1	JPN; 2	CHN; 1	CHN; 2	MAC; 1	MAC; 2	NC	0

=== Complete TCR International Series results ===
(key) (Races in bold indicate pole position) (Races in italics indicate fastest lap)

Year	Team	Car	1	2	3	4	5	6	7	8	9	10	11	12	13	14	15	16	17	18	19	20	21	22	DC	Points
2015	Lukoil Racing Team	SEAT León Cup Racer	MYS; 1	MYS; 2	CHN; 1	CHN; 2	ESP; 1	ESP; 2	POR; 1	POR; 2	ITA; 1	ITA; 2	AUT; 1	AUT; 2	RUS; 1; 11	RUS; 2; 9	RBR; 1	RBR; 2	SIN; 1	SIN; 2	THA; 1	THA; 2	MAC; 1	MAC; 2	39th	2
