= Fernando Monje =

Spanish racing driver (born 1993)

- Nationality: Spanish
- Full name: Fernando Monje Vicario
- Born: 7 March 1993 (age 33) Barcelona, Spain

World Touring Car Championship career
- Debut season: 2012
- Current team: Campos Racing
- Car number: 19
- Former teams: Tuenti Racing Team
- Starts: 34
- Wins: 0
- Poles: 0
- Fastest laps: 0
- Best finish: 24th in 2012-13

Previous series
- 2012 2010–11 2009 2009: European Touring Car Cup; European F3 Open Championship; Formul'Academy Euro Series; SEAT León Supercopa Spain

Championship titles
- 2012: European Touring Car Cup

Fernando Monje Vicario (born 7 March 1993) is a former Spanish racing driver who competed in the World Touring Car Championship.

== Career ==
=== Early career ===
Monje was born in Barcelona. He began his career in karting in 2005 at the age of twelve and competed in karting until 2009.

Monje switched to single-seaters in 2009 at the age of 16 when he debuted in the Formul'Academy Euro Series, finishing tenth in the drivers' championship. He also contested the last round of the Spanish SEAT León Supercopa with SUNRED Engineering. For 2010, he graduated to the European F3 Open Championship with De Villota Motorsport and finished the season in sixth position. He remained in the series in 2011, but switched to the Drivex team. He ultimately finished the season in fifteenth position.

=== World Touring Car Championship ===
==== SUNRED and Tuenti Racing (2012) ====
In 2012, Monje revived his SUNRED cooperation to compete in the World Touring Car Championship. He also competed in the European Touring Car Cup, finishing the season as overall champion. Having finished the European Touring Car Cup, he returned to the WTCC, for the remainder of 2012, to drive a SEAT León WTCC for the Tuenti Racing Team. In the first race of his return at the Race of Brazil, Monje secured his first point by finishing tenth in race one. He was involved in a pileup at the start of race one at the Race of the United States, and along with Aleksei Dudukalo and Alberto Cerqui was forced to retire. Early on in the second race, he crashed and his car was left near the apex of turn five for the rest of the race. He got his second point of the season in the season finale at Macau, finishing tenth once again. His two points meant he finished 24th in the championship having participated in half the races.

==== Campos Racing (2013–) ====
Monje joined new team Campos Racing for the 2013 season, racing alongside Hugo Valente. He started on pole position for race two of the Race of Morocco but dropped out of the race on the second lap after a collision with James Thompson. After the race he was given a five–place grid penalty for the Race of Slovakia having been deemed responsible for the collision.

== Racing record ==
=== Career summary ===
Season	Series	Team	Races	Wins	Poles	F/Laps	Podiums	Points	Position
2009	Formul'Academy Euro Series	Auto Sport Academy	14	0	0	1	0	35	10th
2009	SEAT León Supercopa Spain	SUNRED Engineering	2	0	0	0	0	0	NC
2009	Catalan Single Seater Championship	EmiliodeVillota.com Motorsport	2	2	2	2	2	?	?
2010	European F3 Open	De Villota Motorsport	16	0	1	1	2	46	6th
2010	SEAT León Eurocup	SUNRED	2	0	0	0	0	0	38th
2011	European F3 Open	Drivex	16	0	0	1	0	26	15th
2012	European Touring Car Cup - Super 2000	SUNRED Engineering	8	6	3	7	6	73	**1st**
2012	World Touring Car Championship	SUNRED Engineering	2	0	0	0	0	2	24th
2012	World Touring Car Championship	Tuenti Racing Team	10	0	0	0	0	2	24th
2013	World Touring Car Championship	Campos Racing	22	0	0	0	0	1	24th
2014	International GT Open - Super GT	Drivex School	2	0	0	0	0	0	NC
2014	International GT Open - GTS	Team Novadriver	2	0	0	0	0	0	NC
2015	International GT Open - GT3 Pro-Am	Teo Martín Motorsport	2	1	0	0	1	0	NC
2015	TCR International Series	Campos Racing	4	0	0	0	1	26	16th
2016	International GT Open - GT3 Pro-Am	BMW Team Teo Martín	13	1	1	0	5	49	**3rd**
2018	Trofeo de España TCR	PCR Sport	8	0	1	5	3	150	6th
2019	Trofeo de España TCR	PCR Sport	1	0	0	0	0	0	NC†
2023	Porsche Carrera Cup France	Martinet by Alméras	2	0	0	0	0	0	NC
2024	Porsche Supercup	Martinet / Forestier Racing	2	0	0	0	0	0	23rd
2024	Porsche Sprint Challenge Southern Europe - Pro	Martinet by Alméras	8	0	0	0	0	16	21st
2024	Porsche Carrera Cup France	Martinet by Alméras	4	0	0	0	0	17	18th

=== Complete World Touring Car Championship results ===
(key) (Races in bold indicate pole position) (Races in italics indicate fastest lap)

Year	Team	Car	1	2	3	4	5	6	7	8	9	10	11	12	13	14	15	16	17	18	19	20	21	22	23	24	DC	Points
2012	SUNRED Engineering	SUNRED SR León 1.6T	ITA; 1	ITA; 2	ESP; 1; 21	ESP; 2; 18	MAR; 1	MAR; 2	SVK; 1	SVK; 2	HUN; 1	HUN; 2	AUT; 1	AUT; 2	POR; 1	POR; 2											24th	2
2012	Tuenti Racing Team	SEAT León WTCC															BRA; 1; 10	BRA; 2; 14	USA; 1 Ret	USA; 2 Ret	JPN; 1; 14	JPN; 2 Ret	CHN; 1 Ret	CHN; 2; 16	MAC; 1; 14	MAC; 2; 10	24th	2
2013	Campos Racing	SEAT León WTCC	ITA; 1; 12	ITA; 2; 15	MAR; 1; 11	**MAR**; **2** Ret	SVK; 1; 15	SVK; 2; 16	HUN; 1; 16	HUN; 2; 18	AUT; 1 Ret	AUT; 2; 17	RUS; 1; 15	RUS; 2; 18	POR; 1; 15	POR; 2 Ret	ARG; 1; 16	ARG; 2; 14	USA; 1; 23	USA; 2; 15	JPN; 1; 10	JPN; 2; 13	CHN; 1; 29	CHN; 2; 19	MAC; 1	MAC; 2	24th	1

=== Complete TCR International Series results ===
(key) (Races in bold indicate pole position) (Races in italics indicate fastest lap)

Year	Team	Car	1	2	3	4	5	6	7	8	9	10	11	12	13	14	15	16	17	18	19	20	21	22	DC	Points
2015	Campos Racing	Opel Astra OPC	MYS; 1	MYS; 2	CHN; 1	CHN; 2	ESP; 1	ESP; 2	POR; 1	POR; 2	ITA; 1; 5	ITA; 2; 3	AUT; 1 DNS	AUT; 2 DNS	RUS; 1	RUS; 2	RBR; 1	RBR; 2	SIN; 1; 10	SIN; 2; 19†	THA; 1	THA; 2	MAC; 1	MAC; 2	16th	26

^{†} Driver did not finish the race, but was classified as he completed over 90% of the race distance.

=== Complete Porsche Supercup results ===
(key) (Races in bold indicate pole position; races in italics indicate fastest lap)

Year	Team	1	2	3	4	5	6	7	8	Pos.	Points
2024	Martinet / Forestier Racing	IMO; 20	MON; 21	RBR	SIL	HUN	SPA	ZND	MNZ	23rd	0
