= Mikhail Kozlovskiy =

Russian racing driver

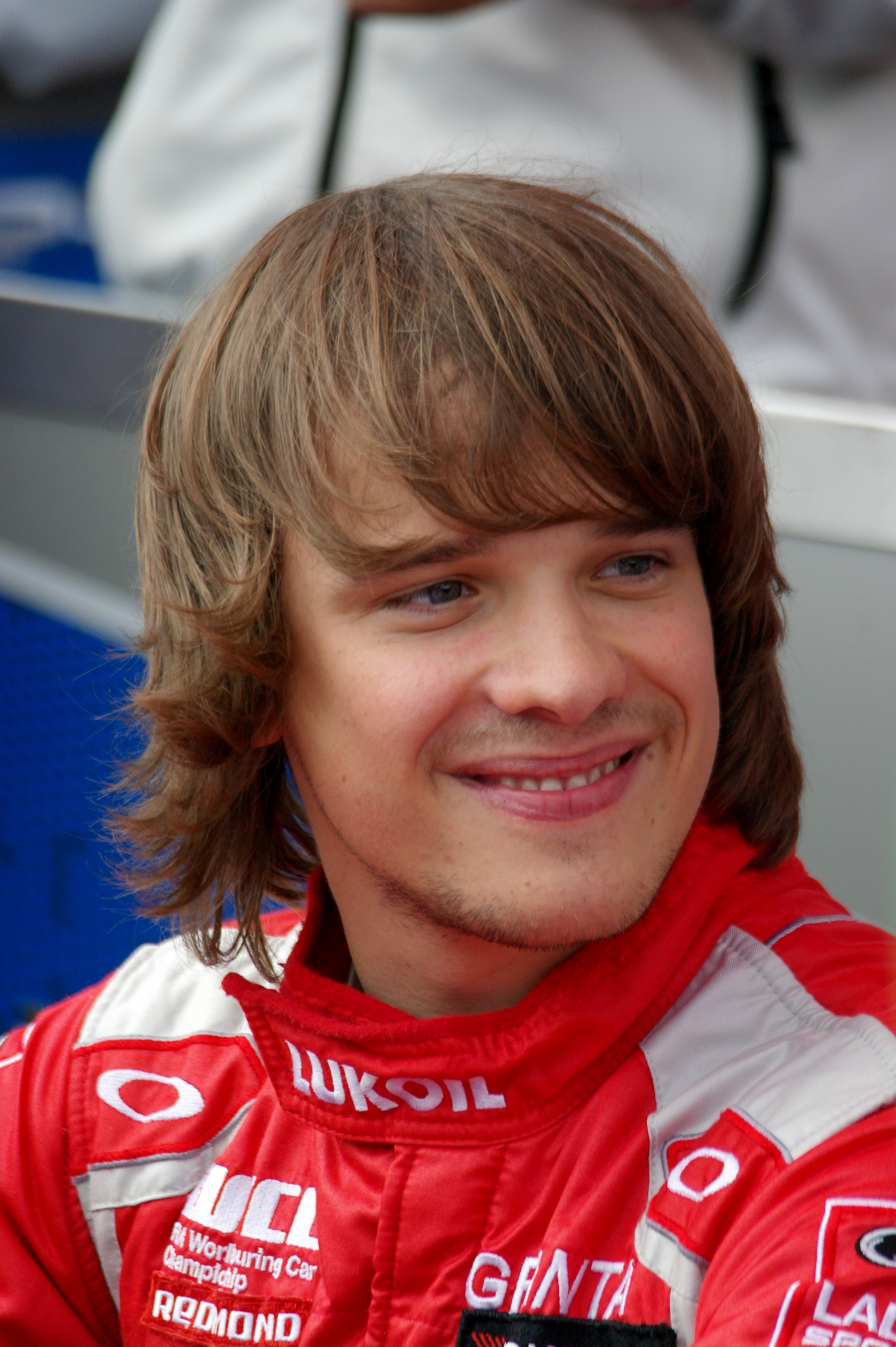
- Kozlovskiy at the 2014 FIA WTCC Race of Belgium.
- Nationality: Russian
- Born: Mikhail Sergeyevich Kozlovskiy; 17 October 1989 (age 37) Leningrad (Soviet Union)

World Touring Car Championship career
- Debut season: 2013
- Current team: Lada Sport Rosneft
- Car number: 14
- Starts: 48
- Wins: 0
- Poles: 0
- Fastest laps: 0
- Best finish: 5th in 2014

Previous series
- 2012 2011 2009–10 2008 2006 2005: RTCC; European Production Series; RTCC Light Championship; Russian SEAT León Cup; Formula 1600 Russia; Formula RUS

Championship titles
- 2010 2008: RTCC Light Championship; Russian SEAT León Cup

Mikhail Sergeyevich Kozlovskiy (Russian: Михаил Сергеевич Козловский, born 17 October 1989 in Leningrad) is a Russian auto racing driver. He won the Russian Touring Car Championship in 2010 (RTCC – Touring-Light). He currently races in the World Touring Car Championship with Lada Sport Lukoil.

== Racing career ==
=== World Touring Car Championship ===
==== Lada Sport Lukoil (2013–2014) / Lada Sport Rosneft (2015) ====
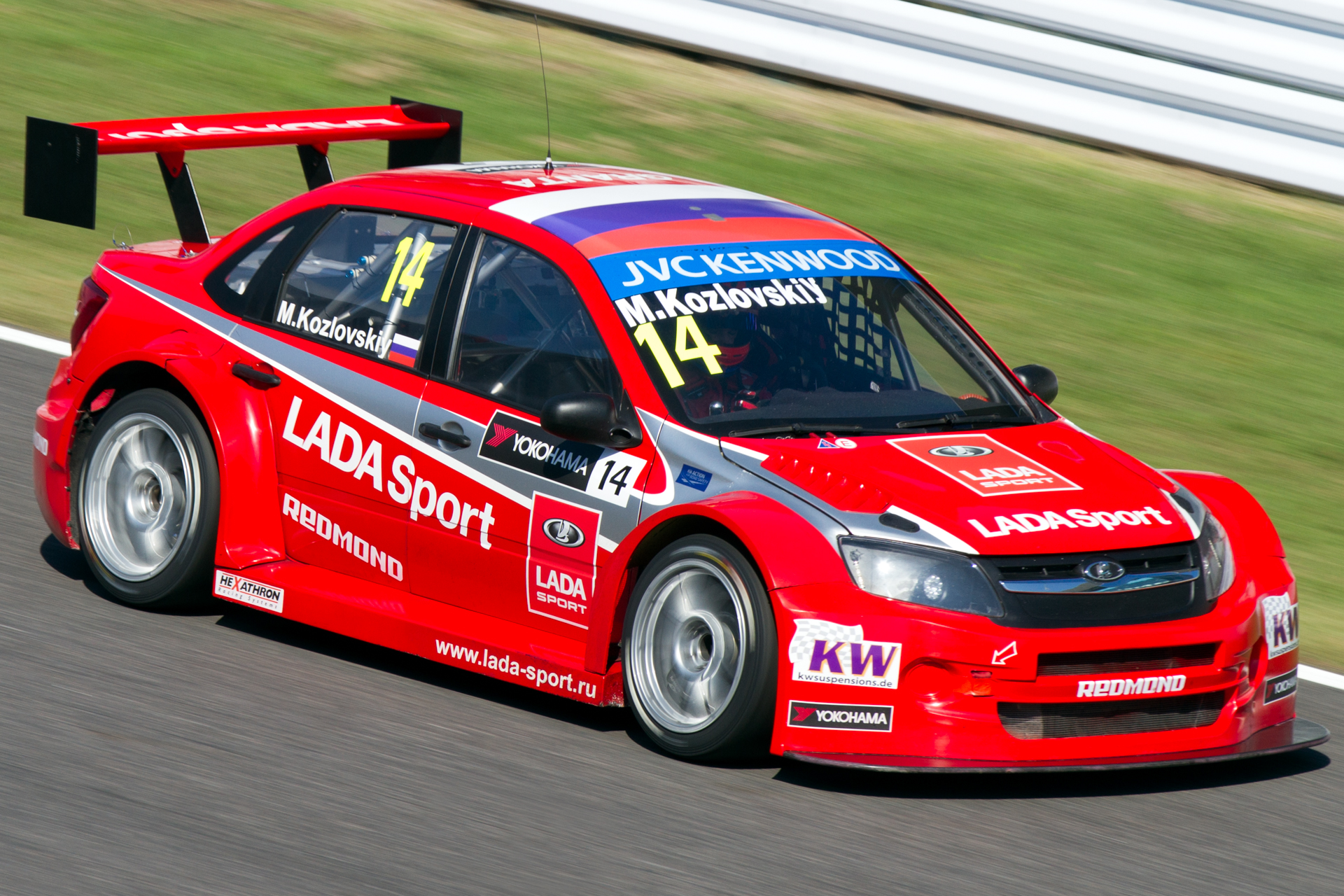
Kozlovskiy competing in the 2014 World Touring Car Championship

Kozlovskiy was brought in to the Lada Sport Lukoil team prior to the second round of the 2013 World Touring Car Championship season in Morocco to replace Aleksey Dudukalo in their second Lada Granta WTCC alongside experienced touring car driver James Thompson.

"Mikhail is a young, talented driver. I am sure he will be able to adapt to the car, the team and WTCC the format," team manager Viktor Shapovalov said. I am confident that our partnership in WTCC will be successful."

"Each touring car driver dreams of [racing in the] WTCC and I am no exception", Kozlovskiy said.

He scored his best finish at the opening event of the 2014 season in Morocco, finishing fifth in race two.

Kozlovskiy was the team's top finisher at Spa-Francorchamps in 2014.

Kozlovskiy represented the WTCC at the official launch of the Moscow Raceway.

=== European Production Series ===
==== Lukoil-Sunred (2011) ====
2011 was the first international Touring Car season for Kozlovskiy, where he proved himself winning 4 races out of 6, alongside Marcos De Diego.

=== RTCC ===
==== Lukoil Racing Team (2009 - 2010) - Touring Light ====
In 2009, Kozlovskiy joined Lukoil Racing Team and became a Russian Vice-Champion in the first year with the team.

Kozlovskiy claimed his first title becoming the Russian Champion in 2010.

==== Manuscript Sport / Sport Garage (2008) ====
Seat Leon Cup Russia - Winner

RTCC, Touring - 3rd place

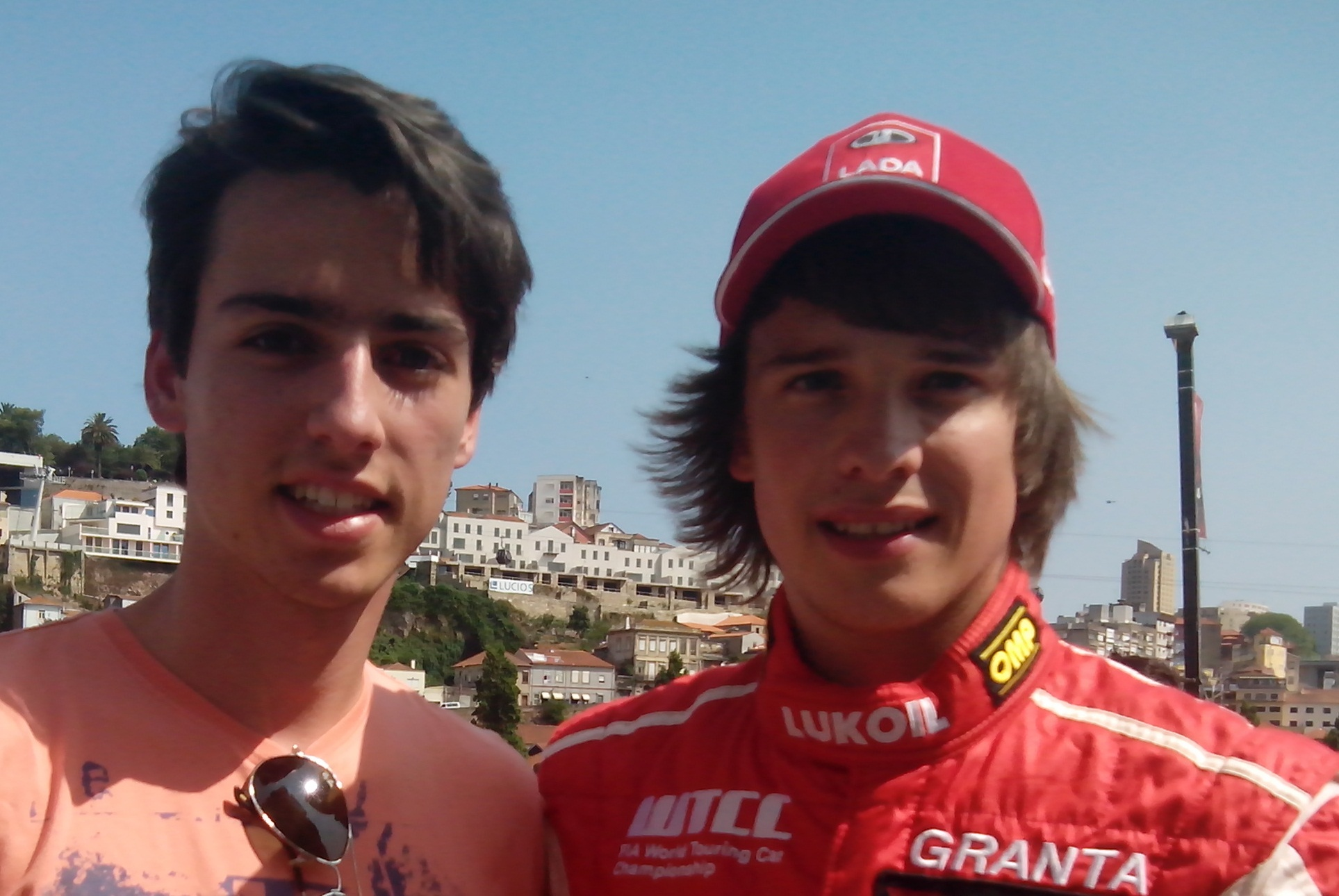
Mikhail Kozlovskiy with Diogo Cardia

== Racing record ==
=== Complete World Touring Car Championship results ===
(key) (Races in bold indicate pole position) (Races in italics indicate fastest lap)

Year	Team	Car	1	2	3	4	5	6	7	8	9	10	11	12	13	14	15	16	17	18	19	20	21	22	23	24	DC	Points
2013	Lada Sport Lukoil	Lada Granta WTCC	ITA; 1	ITA; 2	MAR; 1; 16	MAR; 2; 13	SVK; 1; 20	SVK; 2; 20	HUN; 1; 17	HUN; 2; 20	AUT; 1; 16	AUT; 2; 15	RUS; 1; 14	RUS; 2 Ret	POR; 1; 19	POR; 2; 19	ARG; 1 Ret	ARG; 2; 16	USA; 1; 19	USA; 2; 18	JPN; 1; 15	JPN; 2; 19	CHN; 1; 17	CHN; 2; 20	MAC; 1; 15	MAC; 2 Ret	NC	0
2014	Lada Sport Lukoil	Lada Granta 1.6T	MAR; 1; 11	MAR; 2; 5	FRA; 1; 15	FRA; 2; 14	HUN; 1 Ret	HUN; 2 Ret	SVK; 1 Ret	SVK; 2 C	AUT; 1; 14	AUT; 2; 10	RUS; 1; 15	RUS; 2 Ret	BEL; 1; 14	BEL; 2; 12	ARG; 1; 14	ARG; 2; 11	BEI; 1; 11	BEI; 2 DNS	CHN; 1 Ret	CHN; 2; 11	JPN; 1; 14	JPN; 2; 13	MAC; 1; 13	MAC; 2 Ret	16th	11
2015	Lada Sport Rosneft	Lada Vesta WTCC	ARG; 1	ARG; 2	MAR; 1; 12	MAR; 2 Ret	HUN; 1 Ret	HUN; 2 Ret	GER; 1	GER; 2	RUS; 1	RUS; 2	SVK; 1	SVK; 2	FRA; 1	FRA; 2	POR; 1	POR; 2	JPN; 1	JPN; 2	CHN; 1	CHN; 2	THA; 1	THA; 2	QAT; 1	QAT; 2	NC	0
