= Fredy Barth =

Swiss racing driver (born 1979)

- Nationality: Swiss
- Born: Frédéric Nicolas Barth; 5 December 1979 (age 46) Lucerne, Switzerland

World Touring Car Championship career
- Debut season: 2010
- Current team: Wiechers-Sport
- Categorisation: FIA Silver
- Car number: 77
- Former teams: SEAT Swiss Racing by SUNRED
- Starts: 63
- Wins: 0
- Poles: 0
- Fastest laps: 1
- Best finish: 13th in 2010

Previous series
- 2012 2008–09 2007, 09 2007 2004–09 2005 2003 2002 2001: Blancpain Endurance Series; SEAT León Eurocup; VLN; SEAT León Supercopa Spain; SEAT León Supercopa Germany; Ford Fiesta Cup Germany; Formula Volkswagen Germany; Formula Renault 2.0 Eurocup; Formula Renault Campus

Frédéric Nicolas "Fredy" Barth (born 5 December 1979 in Lucerne) is an auto racing driver from Switzerland. He currently drives in the World Touring Car Championship.

== Racing career ==
=== Early years ===
Barth started out in karting before stepping up to French Formula Renault Campus in 2001, where he finished fifth. In 2002, he moved to the Formula Renault 2.0 Eurocup, although he scored no points in nine starts. In 2003, he competed in Formula Volkswagen Germany, where he finished tenth.

=== SEAT León Supercopa ===
In 2004, Barth moved to touring cars, when he raced in the German SEAT Leon Supercopa, finishing fifth in the standings. He finished third in the standings in 2006, behind champion Florian Gruber and René Rast. He raced in the Spanish SEAT Leon Supercopa in 2007, finishing fifth in the standings. He moved to the new SEAT León Eurocup in 2008, finishing 17th in the championship. In 2009, he improved to finish third in the standings behind champion Norbert Michelisz and Massimiliano Pedalà.

=== World Touring Car Championship ===
==== SEAT Swiss Racing by SUNRED (2010–2012) ====
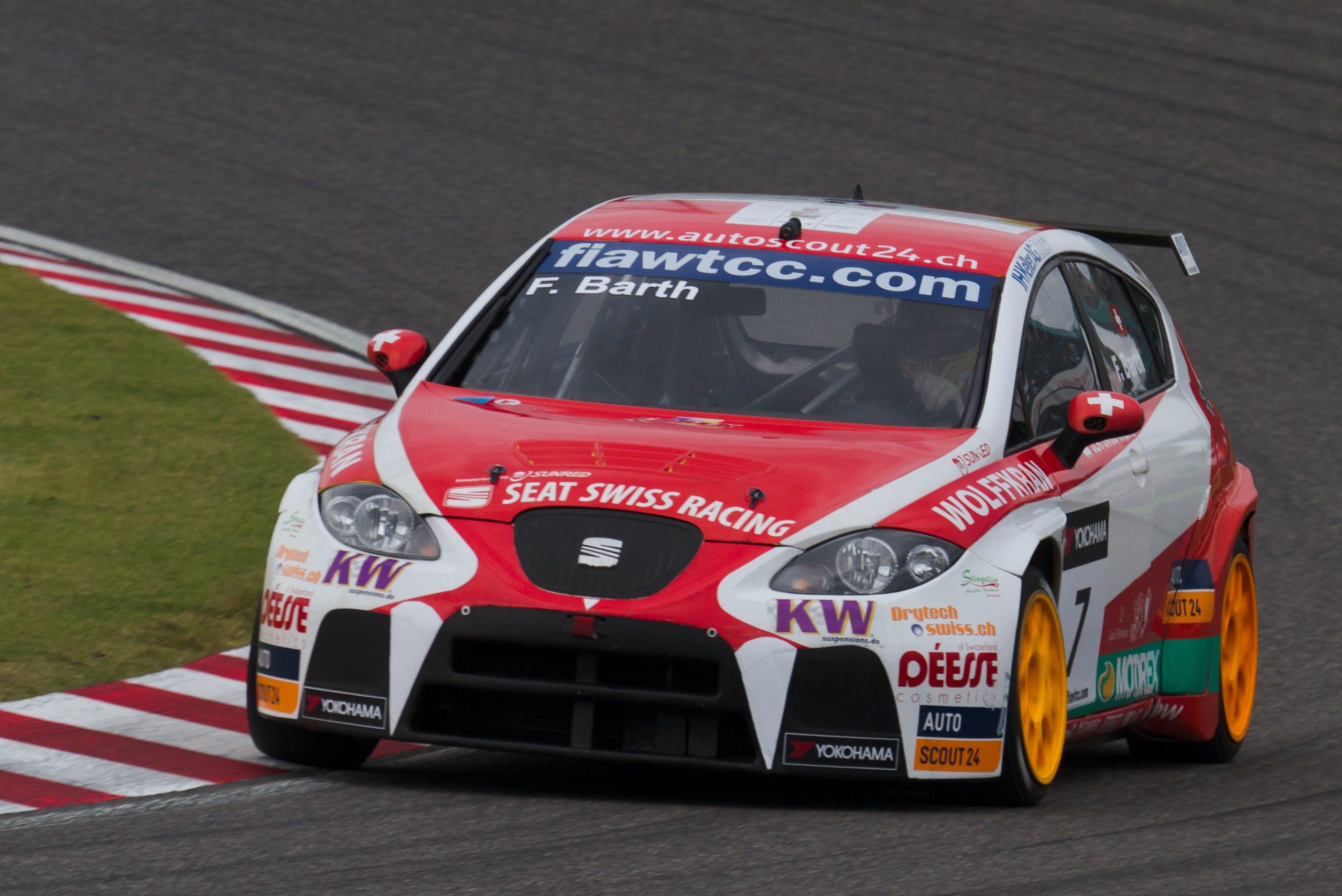
Barth driving for SEAT Swiss Racing at the 2011 FIA WTCC Race of Japan.

Barth made his World Touring Car Championship debut for Sunred Engineering at the 2010 FIA WTCC Race of Brazil. At the start of race one of the Race of Morocco, he moved up from eighth to third but was demoted to fourth by Tiago Monteiro, a position which he finished in. He started on the reversed grid pole position in Portugal but a slow start dropped him down to eighth at the end of the first lap. Barth finished the season thirteenth in the overall standings and third in the Rookie Challenge having led early on.

Barth returned for another season in 2011, racing under the SEAT Swiss Racing by SUNRED banner. He was due to start on the reversed grid pole for the Race of Belgium but due to damage sustained in race one he was unable to take up his position on the grid. At the season finale in Macau, a major accident on the Friday ruled him out of the rest of the weekend. Barth was knocked unconscious by the impact before the car caught fire, he was extracted from the car and taken to hospital to treat smoke inhalation, back contusion and concussion. He was discharged from hospital the following morning.

Barth was unable to secure a budget to continue in the WTCC for a full season in 2012, electing instead to race in the Blancpain Endurance Series. He returned to the WTCC for the final two rounds of the season. In his first race back at the Race of China he finished tenth in the provisional classification before a 30-second penalty dropped him out of the points, to fourteenth.

==== Wiechers-Sport (2013) ====
Barth joined Wiechers-Sport for the 2013 season, driving their BMW 320 TC which took Stefano D'Aste to two wins the previous season. He collided with Robert Huff during qualifying for the Race of Italy, breaking the suspension on Huff's SEAT although neither driver were penalised. Barth went on to qualifying in 20th place. He had originally planned to miss the Race of Portugal and the Race of Brazil due to clashes with his 24 Hours of Spa programme. He raced in Portugal. For the Race of Argentina, he was replaced at Wiechers-Sport by local driver José María López, Barth would return to the seat for the rest of the season except the Race of Japan.

== Racing record ==
=== Complete World Touring Car Championship results ===
(key) (Races in bold indicate pole position) (Races in italics indicate fastest lap)

Year	Team	Car	1	2	3	4	5	6	7	8	9	10	11	12	13	14	15	16	17	18	19	20	21	22	23	24	DC	Points
2010	SEAT Swiss Racing by SUNRED	SEAT León TDI	BRA; 1; 9	BRA; 2; 14	MAR; 1; 4	MAR; 2; 5	ITA; 1; 6	ITA; 2; 14	BEL; 1; 10	BEL; 2; 18	POR; 1; 8	**POR**; **2**; 8	GBR; 1; 11	GBR; 2 Ret	CZE; 1; 12	CZE; 2; 8	GER; 1; 11	GER; 2; 20	ESP; 1; 7	ESP; 2 Ret	JPN; 1 Ret	JPN; 2; 13	MAC; 1 Ret	MAC; 2 Ret			13th	51
2011	SEAT Swiss Racing by SUNRED	SEAT León 2.0 TDI	BRA; 1; 15	BRA; 2 Ret	BEL; 1 Ret	**BEL**; **2** DNS	ITA; 1; 10	ITA; 2; 19																			19th	7
2011	SEAT Swiss Racing by SUNRED	SUNRED SR León 1.6T							HUN; 1; 8	HUN; 2; 10	CZE; 1 Ret	CZE; 2; 16	POR; 1 NC	POR; 2; 10	GBR; 1; 13	GBR; 2; 11	GER; 1 NC	GER; 2 Ret	ESP; 1; 19	ESP; 2; 18	JPN; 1 Ret	JPN; 2 DNS	CHN; 1; 21	CHN; 2; 12	MAC; 1 DNS	MAC; 2 DNS	19th	7
2012	SEAT Swiss Racing by SUNRED	SEAT León WTCC	ITA; 1	ITA; 2	ESP; 1	ESP; 2	MAR; 1	MAR; 2	SVK; 1	SVK; 2	HUN; 1	HUN; 2	AUT; 1	AUT; 2	POR; 1	POR; 2	BRA; 1	BRA; 2	USA; 1	USA; 2	JPN; 1	JPN; 2	CHN; 1; 14	CHN; 2; 14	MAC; 1; 8	MAC; 2; 8	21st	8
2013	Wiechers-Sport	BMW 320 TC	ITA; 1; 10	ITA; 2; 14	MAR; 1; 13	MAR; 2; 12	SVK; 1; 11	SVK; 2; 13	HUN; 1 Ret	HUN; 2; 22†	AUT; 1; 6	AUT; 2; 13	RUS; 1 Ret	RUS; 2 DNS	POR; 1; 17	POR; 2; 21†	ARG; 1	ARG; 2	USA; 1; 17	USA; 2; 7	JPN; 1	JPN; 2	CHN; 1; 19	CHN; 2; 21	MAC; 1 DNS	MAC; 2 DNS	17th	15

^{*} Season still in progress.
