= European Production Series =

- Category: Touring car racing
- Country: Europe
- Inaugural season: 2011
- Tyre suppliers: Yokohama
- Official website: ep-series.com

The European Production Series was a touring car racing series which ran for a single season in 2011. Intended to be a support series to the World Touring Car Championship, the European Production Series ran over the six European rounds of the WTCC. The series did not put together a grid for 2012, and was not re-established.

== Background ==
The European Production Series was created as a support series for the European rounds of the World Touring Car Championship (WTCC). It was launched in December 2010 by WTCC driver Jordi Gené, V-Line Org (organisers of the Spanish Endurance Cup) and Sunred team manager Ian Planas. It was approved by the Fédération Internationale de l'Automobile (FIA) as an International Series. Planas was the president of the organising committee, with Gené and V-Line's Francesc Gutiérrez as stewards. The series supported six rounds of the 2011 WTCC season.

== Eligible cars and classes ==
Admitted vehicles fit into five categories:

- D1: Vehicles with a maximum power of 400 hp. Also included all vehicles of higher power as long as their weight/power ratio is not lower than 2.6 kg/hp
- D2: Vehicles with a maximum power of 320 hp. Also included all vehicles of higher power as long as their weight/power ratio is not lower than 3.6 kg/hp.
- D3: Vehicles with a maximum power of 220 hp. Also included all vehicles of higher power as long as their weight/power ratio is not lower than 4.5 kg/hp
- D4: Vehicles with a maximum power of 160 hp. There are also included all vehicles of higher power as long as their weight/power ratio is not lower than 5.8 kg/hp.
- D5: SEAT León Supercopa

All cars used Yokohama Tyres.

== Race format ==
There were six race meetings each year. Each meeting consisted of either two 50 minute races or a single "endurance" race of up to 3 hours of duration. Each car could have one or two drivers.
