= 2013 FIA WTCC Race of Austria =

Race details
- Round 5 of 12 in the 2013 World Touring Car Championship at Salzburgring in Salzburg, Austria.
- Date: 19 May, 2013
- Location: Salzburg, Austria
- Course: Salzburgring; 4.241 kilometres (2.635 mi)

Race One
- Laps: 12
Pole position
Driver		(France) Yvan Muller	RML
Time		1:25.756	
Podium
First		(Denmark) Michel Nykjær	NIKA Racing
Second		(United Kingdom) James Nash	bamboo-engineering
Third		(France) Yvan Muller	RML
Fastest Lap
Driver		(United Kingdom) Alex MacDowall	bamboo-engineering
Time		1:26.925	

Race Two
- Laps: 12
Podium
First		(United Kingdom) James Nash	bamboo-engineering
Second		(France) Yvan Muller	RML
Third		(Hungary) Norbert Michelisz	Zengő Motorsport
Fastest Lap
Driver		(France) Yvan Muller	RML
Time		1:26.875	

The 2013 FIA WTCC Race of Austria was the fifth round of the 2013 World Touring Car Championship season and the second running of the FIA WTCC Race of Austria. It was held on 19 May 2013 at the Salzburgring in Salzburg, Austria.

Both races were won from pole position with Michel Nykjær taking victory in the first race for NIKA Racing and James Nash won race two, the first victory in the World Touring Car Championship for both himself and the bamboo-engineering team. This was the first time in WTCC history that both races in a weekend were won by drivers eligible for the Yokohama Independents' Trophy.

The round is best remembered for a qualifying incident where all twelve cars in the second part of qualifying drove slowly around the lap before what was supposed to be their final flying lap. The cars drove slowly around the lap in order to ensure themselves a slipstream for the next lap but all of them missed the checkered flag. A total of fourteen drivers were penalised after the session which drastically reshuffled the grid.

== Background ==
Coming into the Austrian round Yvan Muller was leading the world drivers' championship and Nash was leading the Yokohama Independents' Trophy.

The Honda Civic WTCCs gained 10 kg of ballast when the compensation weights were revised, pulling them on the maximum ballast of 1,190 kg equal to the Chevrolet Cruze 1.6Ts. The SEAT León WTCCs gained 10 kg to take their weight up to 1,160 kg and the BMW 320 TCs returned to their base weight of 1,150 kg.

Special Tuning Racing elected to miss the Austrian and Russian rounds in order to fix their car which had been plagued with issues since the Race of Morocco.

Following his crash in Hungary, Gabriele Tarquini was allowed by the FIA to run a new engine in his Honda Civic without a penalty.

== Report ==
=== Free practice ===
Muller topped the opening practice session leading a Chevrolet 1–2–3 ahead of Tom Chilton and Alex MacDowall. Robert Huff was the fastest SEAT in fourth and Norbert Michelisz was fifth in his Zengő Motorsport Honda while the works drivers were both outside the top ten. Darryl O'Young did not set a time during the session due to a turbo problem on his ROAL Motorsport BMW 320 TC.

Muller led Huff in the second free practice session, Nash in third was the fastest independent driver. James Thompson didn't set any times and spent the entire session in the pit lane while Hugo Valente stopped on track with five minutes to go.

=== Qualifying ===
Chilton led the first session which had seen a number of incidents. Tom Coronel locked up and avoided hitting Pepe Oriola. Oriola then had a collision with the rear of Charles Ng with both sustaining minor bodywork damage. Many of the drivers were trying to get into the slipstream of other cars and towards the end of the session, a group of cars led by Tarquini were slowed as they came round to start a flying lap with Coronel being caught out by the slow moving cars ahead and being launched over the Campos Racing SEAT of Valente. Thompson had parked his car on the exit of the first corner due to steering problems. At the end of the session, Marc Basseng went wide at the final corner and clipped the barriers on the outside before spinning to a halt in front of the pit entry.

All twelve cars formed up for a final flying lap in Q2 with Chilton at the front. Chilton had been going around the lap slowly and with the cars behind looking for a slipstream, nobody overtook. None of the cars made it around to the start line before the checkered flag came out, some of cars dived straight into the pits while others carried on. Coronel had continued and lost the rear of his BMW on one of the fast corners and went backwards into the tyre wall. At the end of the session with an RML 1–2 with Muller ahead of Chilton. Huff was third and MacDowall in fourth was the leading independent. Nash was tenth and claimed the pole position for race two.

After the session, fourteen drivers were called the stewards. All the drivers who took part in Q2 bar Nykjær plus O'Young, Valente and Mikhail Kozlovskiy were summoned. Twelve drivers were deemed to be guilty of unsporting behaviour. Tarquini lost twelve places, Oriola lost eight places and Coronel dropped fifteen places. Muller, Chilton, Michelisz and Tiago Monteiro lost twelve places, Huff received a ten place penalty, MacDowall moved down eight places while Stefano D'Aste, O'Young and Valente all lost five places on the grid. WTCC General Manager Marcello Lotti commented on the incident during the warm–up session the following morning and confirmed the penalties would be applied to race one only.

After qualifying the Honda cars were found to be running illegal rear wings, Tarquini, Monteiro and Michelisz were sent to the back of the grid for race one.

=== Warm-Up ===
Thompson was quickest in the warm–up session on Sunday morning. D'Aste ended his session in the gravel early on. Nash suffered a puncture and Kozlovskiy spun but neither sustained damage to their cars and continued in the session.

=== Race One ===
Nykjær led away from pole position at the rolling start with Nash challenging him for the lead. Nykjær, Nash and Bennani broke away from the rest of the field while Kozlovskiy who had started fourth was dropping back and was soon behind teammate Thompson. Fredy Barth held fifth place after a number of attempts by MacDowall to get past. Barth was passed and then regained the position twice, first on the back straight and then at the first chicane. Another attempted pass by MacDowall on the back straight allowed Muller to take the pair of them. Muller set off after the leaders and eventually caught Bennani who was demoted to fourth place. Muller's teammate Chilton was battling over the final four points positions with Huff, Thompson and Coronel and he came out ahead in seventh place. There was a coming together between the Liqui Moly Team Engstler cars in the final laps when Ng tried to go up the inside of Engstler in the final sector, they made contact which spun Engstler around who then collided with O'Young. The third sector was covered by yellow flags for the final few laps, reducing passing opportunities for the leaders who were running close together. By the final lap Muller had caught the leading pair and they were bumper to bumper but he couldn't make a move, Nykjær won ahead of Nash and Muller. Thompson finished ninth behind Chilton and Huff to secure his second points finish of the year with Coronel coming from nineteenth to tenth.

=== Race Two ===
Nash was on pole position but he was overtaken my Michelisz before the first corner but retook the lead before the end of the lap. Chilton retired in the pit lane after a collision at the first chicane. MacDowall and Thompson were also caught out and ran through the escape road to return to the circuit. Nash was leading Michelisz and Monteiro but Muller who had started tenth was closing in on the Hondas. His first attempt at passing Monteiro was unsuccessful but with the Chevrolet's superior speed on the back straight the RML driver was able to make the pass stick the following lap. Tarquini had dropped back down the field and was defending eighth place from Huff who was unable to pass the Honda driver. Monteiro in fourth was defending his position from Nykjær in the final laps while on the penultimate lap Muller passed Michelisz; he couldn't catch Nash who claimed his first overall WTCC victory and the first for bamboo–engineering.

== Results ==
=== Qualifying ===
Pos.	No.	Name	Team	Car	C	Q1	Q2	Points
1	12	(France) Yvan Muller	RML	Chevrolet Cruze 1.6T		1:26.981	1:25.756	**5**
2	23	(United Kingdom) Tom Chilton	RML	Chevrolet Cruze 1.6T		1:26.570	1:25.961	**4**
3	1	(United Kingdom) Robert Huff	ALL-INKL.COM Münnich Motorsport	SEAT León WTCC		1:27.128	1:26.554	**3**
4	9	(United Kingdom) Alex MacDowall	bamboo-engineering	Chevrolet Cruze 1.6T	Y	1:26.950	1:26.560	**2**
5	17	(Denmark) Michel Nykjær	NIKA Racing	Chevrolet Cruze 1.6T	Y	1:27.018	1:26.654	**1**
6	3	(Italy) Gabriele Tarquini	Castrol Honda World Touring Car Team	Honda Civic WTCC		1:27.308	1:26.701	
7	18	(Portugal) Tiago Monteiro	Castrol Honda World Touring Car Team	Honda Civic WTCC		1:27.068	1:26.746	
8	74	(Spain) Pepe Oriola	Tuenti Racing Team	SEAT León WTCC		1:27.203	1:26.887	
9	5	(Hungary) Norbert Michelisz	Zengő Motorsport	Honda Civic WTCC		1:27.084	1:26.902	
10	14	(United Kingdom) **James Nash**	bamboo-engineering	Chevrolet Cruze 1.6T	Y	1:27.093	1:26.938	
11	26	(Italy) Stefano D'Aste	PB Racing	BMW 320 TC	Y	1:27.319	1:27.432	
12	15	(Netherlands) Tom Coronel	ROAL Motorsport	BMW 320 TC		1:27.148	10:04.657	
13	25	(Morocco) Mehdi Bennani	Proteam Racing	BMW 320 TC	Y	1:27.323		
14	8	(Russia) Mikhail Kozlovskiy	Lukoil Lada Sport	Lada Granta		1:27.415		
15	73	(Switzerland) Fredy Barth	Wiechers-Sport	BMW 320 TC	Y	1:27.564		
16	6	(Germany) Franz Engstler	Liqui Moly Team Engstler	BMW 320 TC	Y	1:27.647		
17	38	(Germany) Marc Basseng	ALL-INKL.COM Münnich Motorsport	SEAT León WTCC		1:27.860		
18	55	(Hong Kong) Darryl O'Young	ROAL Motorsport	BMW 320 TC	Y	1:28.017		
19	10	(United Kingdom) James Thompson	Lukoil Lada Sport	Lada Granta		1:28.021		
20	7	(Hong Kong) Charles Ng	Liqui Moly Team Engstler	BMW 320 TC	Y	1:28.575		
21	37	(Germany) René Münnich	ALL-INKL.COM Münnich Motorsport	SEAT León WTCC	Y	1:28.932		
22	19	(Spain) Fernando Monje	Campos Racing	SEAT León WTCC	Y	1:29.454		
107% time: 1:32.629
–	20	(France) Hugo Valente	Campos Racing	SEAT León WTCC	Y	no time set		

- **Bold** denotes Pole position for second race.

=== Race 1 ===
Pos.	No.	Name	Team	Car	C	Laps	Time/Retired	Grid	Points
1	17	(Denmark) Michel Nykjær	NIKA Racing	Chevrolet Cruze 1.6T	Y	12	17:41.335	1	25
2	14	(United Kingdom) James Nash	bamboo-engineering	Chevrolet Cruze 1.6T	Y	12	+0.298	2	18
3	12	(France) Yvan Muller	RML	Chevrolet Cruze 1.6T		12	+0.645	13	15
4	25	(Morocco) Mehdi Bennani	Proteam Racing	BMW 320 TC	Y	12	+1.586	3	12
5	9	(United Kingdom) **Alex MacDowall**	bamboo-engineering	Chevrolet Cruze 1.6T	Y	12	+4.374	12	10
6	73	(Switzerland) Fredy Barth	Wiechers-Sport	BMW 320 TC	Y	12	+5.121	5	8
7	23	(United Kingdom) Tom Chilton	RML	Chevrolet Cruze 1.6T		12	+7.114	15	6
8	1	(United Kingdom) Robert Huff	ALL-INKL.COM Münnich Motorsport	SEAT León WTCC		12	+11.711	14	4
9	10	(United Kingdom) James Thompson	Lukoil Lada Sport	Lada Granta		12	+15.758	8	2
10	15	(Netherlands) Tom Coronel	ROAL Motorsport	BMW 320 TC		12	+15.812	19	1
11	74	(Spain) Pepe Oriola	Tuenti Racing Team	SEAT León WTCC		12	+16.000	18	
12	3	(Italy) Gabriele Tarquini	Castrol Honda World Touring Car Team	Honda Civic WTCC		12	+18.388	21	
13	18	(Portugal) Tiago Monteiro	Castrol Honda World Touring Car Team	Honda Civic WTCC		12	+19.097	22	
14	5	(Hungary) Norbert Michelisz	Zengő Motorsport	Honda Civic WTCC		12	+19.604	23	
15	26	(Italy) Stefano D'Aste	PB Racing	BMW 320 TC	Y	12	+20.117	16	
16	8	(Russia) Mikhail Kozlovskiy	Lukoil Lada Sport	Lada Granta		12	+23.511	4	
17	37	(Germany) René Münnich	ALL-INKL.COM Münnich Motorsport	SEAT León WTCC	Y	12	+27.793	10	
18	7	(Hong Kong) Charles Ng	Liqui Moly Team Engstler	BMW 320 TC	Y	12	+32.141	9	
19	6	(Germany) Franz Engstler	Liqui Moly Team Engstler	BMW 320 TC	Y	9	+3 Laps	6	
20	55	(Hong Kong) Darryl O'Young	ROAL Motorsport	BMW 320 TC	Y	9	+3 Laps	17	
Ret	20	(France) Hugo Valente	Campos Racing	SEAT León WTCC	Y	8	Race incident	20	
Ret	38	(Germany) Marc Basseng	ALL-INKL.COM Münnich Motorsport	SEAT León WTCC		8	Race incident	7	
Ret	19	(Spain) Fernando Monje	Campos Racing	SEAT León WTCC	Y	3	Radiator	11	

- **Bold** denotes Fastest lap.

=== Race 2 ===
Pos.	No.	Name	Team	Car	C	Laps	Time/Retired	Grid	Points
1	14	(United Kingdom) James Nash	bamboo-engineering	Chevrolet Cruze 1.6T	Y	12	17:36.853	1	25
2	12	(France) **Yvan Muller**	RML	Chevrolet Cruze 1.6T		12	+1.438	10	18
3	5	(Hungary) Norbert Michelisz	Zengő Motorsport	Honda Civic WTCC		12	+1.818	2	15
4	18	(Portugal) Tiago Monteiro	Castrol Honda World Touring Car Team	Honda Civic WTCC		12	+3.483	4	12
5	17	(Denmark) Michel Nykjær	NIKA Racing	Chevrolet Cruze 1.6T	Y	12	+4.064	6	10
6	9	(United Kingdom) Alex MacDowall	bamboo-engineering	Chevrolet Cruze 1.6T	Y	12	+4.574	7	8
7	74	(Spain) Pepe Oriola	Tuenti Racing Team	SEAT León WTCC		12	+7.898	3	6
8	3	(Italy) Gabriele Tarquini	Castrol Honda World Touring Car Team	Honda Civic WTCC		12	+9.025	5	4
9	1	(United Kingdom) Robert Huff	ALL-INKL.COM Münnich Motorsport	SEAT León WTCC		12	+9.483	8	2
10	15	(Netherlands) Tom Coronel	ROAL Motorsport	BMW 320 TC		12	+9.859	12	1
11	38	(Germany) Marc Basseng	ALL-INKL.COM Münnich Motorsport	SEAT León WTCC		12	+13.627	16	
12	10	(United Kingdom) James Thompson	Lukoil Lada Sport	Lada Granta		12	+14.145	17	
13	73	(Switzerland) Fredy Barth	Wiechers-Sport	BMW 320 TC	Y	12	+14.556	15	
14	6	(Germany) Franz Engstler	Liqui Moly Team Engstler	BMW 320 TC	Y	12	+14.857	19	
15	8	(Russia) Mikhail Kozlovskiy	Lukoil Lada Sport	Lada Granta		12	+15.155	14	
16	25	(Morocco) Mehdi Bennani	Proteam Racing	BMW 320 TC	Y	12	+16.223	13	
17	19	(Spain) Fernando Monje	Campos Racing	SEAT León WTCC	Y	12	+27.497	22	
18	37	(Germany) René Münnich	ALL-INKL.COM Münnich Motorsport	SEAT León WTCC	Y	12	+41.749	18	
19	7	(Hong Kong) Charles Ng	Liqui Moly Team Engstler	BMW 320 TC	Y	12	+46.282	21	
NC	23	(United Kingdom) Tom Chilton	RML	Chevrolet Cruze 1.6T		6	+6 Laps	9	
DNS	26	(Italy) Stefano D'Aste	PB Racing	BMW 320 TC	Y	0	Did not start	11	
DNS	55	(Hong Kong) Darryl O'Young	ROAL Motorsport	BMW 320 TC	Y	0	Did not start	20	
DNS	20	(France) Hugo Valente	Campos Racing	SEAT León WTCC	Y	0	Did not start	23	

- **Bold** denotes Fastest lap.

== Standings after the event ==
Drivers' Championship standings

	Pos	Driver	Points
	1	(France) Yvan Muller	198
	2	(Italy) Gabriele Tarquini	118
2	3	(United Kingdom) James Nash	108
3	4	(Denmark) Michel Nykjær	96
2	5	(United Kingdom) Robert Huff	77

Yokohama Independents' Trophy standings

	Pos	Driver	Points
	1	(United Kingdom) James Nash	78
1	2	(Denmark) Michel Nykjær	70
1	3	(United Kingdom) Alex MacDowall	66
	4	(Morocco) Mehdi Bennani	47
2	5	(Switzerland) Fredy Barth	30

Manufacturers' Championship standings

Pos	Manufacturer	Points
1	(Japan) Honda	417
2	(Russia) Lada	248

- Note: Only the top five positions are included for both sets of drivers' standings.
