= 2013 FIA WTCC Race of Slovakia =

Race details
- Round 3 of 12 in the 2013 World Touring Car Championship at Automotodróm Slovakia Ring in Orechová Potôň, Slovakia.
- Date: 28 April, 2013
- Location: Orechová Potôň, Slovakia
- Course: Automotodróm Slovakia Ring; 5.922 kilometres (3.680 mi)

Race One
- Laps: 10
Pole position
Driver		(Italy) Gabriele Tarquini	Castrol Honda Team
Time		2:10.773	
Podium
First		(Italy) Gabriele Tarquini	Castrol Honda Team
Second		(Portugal) Tiago Monteiro	Castrol Honda Team
Third		(Hungary) Norbert Michelisz	Zengő Motorsport
Fastest Lap
Driver		(Italy) Gabriele Tarquini	Castrol Honda Team
Time		2:12.918	

Race Two
- Laps: 10
Podium
First		(Netherlands) Tom Coronel	ROAL Motorsport
Second		(France) Yvan Muller	RML
Third		(Italy) Gabriele Tarquini	Castrol Honda Team
Fastest Lap
Driver		(Netherlands) Tom Coronel	ROAL Motorsport
Time		2:13.758	

The 2013 FIA WTCC Race of Slovakia was the third round of the 2013 World Touring Car Championship season and the second running of the FIA WTCC Race of Slovakia. It was held on 28 April 2013 at the Automotodróm Slovakia Ring in Orechová Potôň, Slovakia.

The first race was won by Gabriele Tarquini who took the first win for the Castrol Honda World Touring Car Team and the Honda Civic WTCC. Tom Coronel won race two for ROAL Motorsport.

== Background ==
Yvan Muller was leading the world drivers' championship while James Nash was leading the Yokohama Independents' Trophy.

The compensation weight system came into force after the first two rounds, the Chevrolet Cruze 1.6Ts continued with the 40 kg maximum ballast to maintain their weight of 1,190 kg. The BMW 320 TCs and Lada Grantas lost 20 kg to drop to 1,130 kg while the Honda Civic WTCCs and SEAT León WTCCs remained at their base weights of 1,150 kg. The BMWs were allowed to run with three carbon fibre doors to reduce their weight with the original drivers' door remaining the same.

Fernando Monje came into the round with a five–place grid penalty for the first race after his collision with James Thompson at the Race of Morocco.

== Report ==
=== Free practice ===
Tarquini led a Honda 1–2 in the first free practice session with Tiago Monteiro second. Coronel was the fastest BMW driver in third ahead of the RML pair of Muller and Tom Chilton. Fredy Barth ended his session early when he got his Wiechers-Sport BMW stuck in the gravel at turn three while an exhaust fire hindered Zengő Motorsport's Norbert Michelisz.

Tarquini was quickest once again the second practice session, leading Muller and Chilton. Robert Huff was the quickest SEAT driver in fourth and Michelisz was seventh after his problems in the morning session.

=== Qualifying ===
Having led both practice sessions, Tarquini took his second consecutive pole position of the season, leading a Honda 1–2–3 with Monteiro and Michelisz behind. Tom Boardman stopped just after leaving the pit lane for the first time when his engine misfired, he had already had a new engine fitted after his crash in Marrakesh and then required another new engine after free practice two. Five minutes into the first part of qualifying, Darryl O'Young ran wide, crashed his ROAL Motorsport BMW into the barriers at turn nine and brought out the red flags. The session resumed half an hour later once the barriers had been repaired and after Huff topped the times before the stoppage, Tarquini went to the top of the times by the end of Q1. Thompson, Fernando Monje and Marc Basseng failed to get through to the second session for the first time in 2013.

Tarquini was quickest in Q2 with teammate Monteiro ensuring a Castrol Honda World Touring Car Team front row lockout. Michelisz in third shared the second row with championship leader Muller. Coronel ended up tenth to secure the race two pole position on the reversed grid.

Huff failed the ride height check after qualifying and received a ten–place grid penalty for race one as a result.

=== Warm-Up ===
Michelisz was fastest in Sunday morning's warm–up session, the yellow flags were out briefly when Chilton crashed his RML Chevrolet at turn two.

=== Race One ===
Tarquini started on pole position and built up an early lead with Monteiro and Michelisz behind being pursued by Muller. Chilton made contact with Fredy Barth and then went off at turn six on the second lap and got stuck in the gravel trap. Nash held off Coronel for the first eight laps until the bamboo-engineering ran wide at turn eight and allowed Coronel through. Towards the end of the race Michelisz attempted to take second place off Monteiro but did not succeed and the two factory Hondas finished first and second. Four cars were fighting for the final points position with Mehdi Bennani securing tenth spot and Barth beating Stefano D'Aste to eleventh by five thousandths of a second at the line.

=== Race Two ===
Coronel started at the front of the grid and got away from the rest of the field at the start, Pepe Oriola retained his second place and Huff was third. Michel Nykjær didn't get away at the start but the rest of the field avoided him, Nash went out of the race on the opening lap when he ran into one of the gravel traps. On lap two Muller tapped Monteiro out of fourth place and went through. At half distance Huff was able to pass Oriola and Muller also went through into the podium position with Tarquini going down the other side of the SEAT. Muller, Oriola and Tarquini ran three abreast into the next corner where Oriola and Tarquini touched with Oriola dropping down to sixth. Huff and Muller resumed their battle for position until Huff ran wide at turn one allowing both Muller and Tarquini through, Huff was now fourth ahead of Monteiro. Oriola was sixth and battling with Chilton, Michelisz was also involved until he dropped to the back of the field in the final laps. Coronel claimed the win, his first since the 2011 Race of Japan, Muller was second with race one winner Tarquini third.

== Results ==
=== Qualifying ===
Pos.	No.	Name	Team	Car	C	Q1	Q2	Points
1	3	(Italy) Gabriele Tarquini	Castrol Honda World Touring Car Team	Honda Civic WTCC		2:10.308	2:10.773	**5**
2	18	(Portugal) Tiago Monteiro	Castrol Honda World Touring Car Team	Honda Civic WTCC		2:10.907	2:10.877	**4**
3	5	(Hungary) Norbert Michelisz	Zengő Motorsport	Honda Civic WTCC		2:11.288	2:10.889	**3**
4	12	(France) Yvan Muller	RML	Chevrolet Cruze 1.6T		2:10.972	2:10.941	**2**
5	23	(United Kingdom) Tom Chilton	RML	Chevrolet Cruze 1.6T		2:11.335	2:11.162	**1**
6	9	(United Kingdom) Alex MacDowall	bamboo-engineering	Chevrolet Cruze 1.6T	Y	2:11.538	2:11.422	
7	1	(United Kingdom) Robert Huff	ALL-INKL.COM Münnich Motorsport	SEAT León WTCC		2:11.599	2:11.624	
8	14	(United Kingdom) James Nash	bamboo-engineering	Chevrolet Cruze 1.6T	Y	2:11.988	2:11.714	
9	74	(Spain) Pepe Oriola	Tuenti Racing Team	SEAT León WTCC		2:11.936	2:11.882	
10	15	(Netherlands) **Tom Coronel**	ROAL Motorsport	BMW 320 TC		2:12.300	2:12.048	
11	25	(Morocco) Mehdi Bennani	Proteam Racing	BMW 320 TC	Y	2:12.363	2:12.857	
12	17	(Denmark) Michel Nykjær	NIKA Racing	Chevrolet Cruze 1.6T	Y	2:11.738	2:17.614	
13	38	(Germany) Marc Basseng	ALL-INKL.COM Münnich Motorsport	SEAT León WTCC		2:12.603		
14	73	(Switzerland) Fredy Barth	Wiechers-Sport	BMW 320 TC	Y	2:12.610		
15	10	(United Kingdom) James Thompson	Lukoil Lada Sport	Lada Granta		2:12.641		
16	26	(Italy) Stefano D'Aste	PB Racing	BMW 320 TC	Y	2:12.665		
17	7	(Hong Kong) Charles Ng	Liqui Moly Team Engstler	BMW 320 TC	Y	2:12.891		
18	19	(Spain) Fernando Monje	Campos Racing	SEAT León WTCC	Y	2:12.921		
19	37	(Germany) René Münnich	ALL-INKL.COM Münnich Motorsport	SEAT León WTCC	Y	2:13.223		
20	6	(Germany) Franz Engstler	Liqui Moly Team Engstler	BMW 320 TC	Y	2:13.582		
21	8	(Russia) Mikhail Kozlovskiy	Lukoil Lada Sport	Lada Granta		2:14.900		
107% time: 2:19.429
–	55	(Hong Kong) Darryl O'Young	ROAL Motorsport	BMW 320 TC	Y	13:16.907		
–	22	(United Kingdom) Tom Boardman	Special Tuning Racing	SEAT León WTCC	Y	no time set		

- **Bold** denotes Pole position for second race.

=== Race 1 ===
Pos.	No.	Name	Team	Car	C	Laps	Time/Retired	Grid	Points
1	3	(Italy) **Gabriele Tarquini**	Castrol Honda World Touring Car Team	Honda Civic WTCC		10	22:18.761	1	25
2	18	(Portugal) Tiago Monteiro	Castrol Honda World Touring Car Team	Honda Civic WTCC		10	+1.202	2	18
3	5	(Hungary) Norbert Michelisz	Zengő Motorsport	Honda Civic WTCC		10	+1.616	3	15
4	12	(France) Yvan Muller	RML	Chevrolet Cruze 1.6T		10	+5.091	4	12
5	15	(Netherlands) Tom Coronel	ROAL Motorsport	BMW 320 TC		10	+5.975	9	10
6	14	(United Kingdom) James Nash	bamboo-engineering	Chevrolet Cruze 1.6T	Y	10	+7.748	7	8
7	17	(Denmark) Michel Nykjær	NIKA Racing	Chevrolet Cruze 1.6T	Y	10	+9.760	11	6
8	9	(United Kingdom) Alex MacDowall	bamboo-engineering	Chevrolet Cruze 1.6T	Y	10	+10.078	6	4
9	74	(Spain) Pepe Oriola	Tuenti Racing Team	SEAT León WTCC		10	+14.055	8	2
10	25	(Morocco) Mehdi Bennani	Proteam Racing	BMW 320 TC	Y	10	+19.374	10	1
11	73	(Switzerland) Fredy Barth	Wiechers-Sport	BMW 320 TC	Y	10	+21.474	13	
12	26	(Italy) Stefano D'Aste	PB Racing	BMW 320 TC	Y	10	+21.479	15	
13	10	(United Kingdom) James Thompson	Lukoil Lada Sport	Lada Granta		10	+21.837	14	
14	55	(Hong Kong) Darryl O'Young	ROAL Motorsport	BMW 320 TC	Y	10	+24.891	22	
15	19	(Spain) Fernando Monje	Campos Racing	SEAT León WTCC	Y	10	+25.937	21	
16	38	(Germany) Marc Basseng	ALL-INKL.COM Münnich Motorsport	SEAT León WTCC		10	+27.197	12	
17	1	(United Kingdom) Robert Huff	ALL-INKL.COM Münnich Motorsport	SEAT León WTCC		10	+27.507	17	
18	7	(Hong Kong) Charles Ng	Liqui Moly Team Engstler	BMW 320 TC	Y	10	+36.500	16	
19	6	(Germany) Franz Engstler	Liqui Moly Team Engstler	BMW 320 TC	Y	10	+41.278	19	
20	8	(Russia) Mikhail Kozlovskiy	Lukoil Lada Sport	Lada Granta		9	+1 Lap	20	
21	37	(Germany) René Münnich	ALL-INKL.COM Münnich Motorsport	SEAT León WTCC	Y	8	+2 Laps	18	
Ret	22	(United Kingdom) Tom Boardman	Special Tuning Racing	SEAT León WTCC	Y	6	Engine	23	
Ret	23	(United Kingdom) Tom Chilton	RML	Chevrolet Cruze 1.6T		1	Race incident	5	

- **Bold** denotes Fastest lap.

=== Race 2 ===
Pos.	No.	Name	Team	Car	C	Laps	Time/Retired	Grid	Points
1	15	(Netherlands) **Tom Coronel**	ROAL Motorsport	BMW 320 TC		10	22:26.224	1	25
2	12	(France) Yvan Muller	RML	Chevrolet Cruze 1.6T		10	+2.990	7	18
3	3	(Italy) Gabriele Tarquini	Castrol Honda World Touring Car Team	Honda Civic WTCC		10	+3.345	10	15
4	1	(United Kingdom) Robert Huff	ALL-INKL.COM Münnich Motorsport	SEAT León WTCC		10	+4.954	4	12
5	18	(Portugal) Tiago Monteiro	Castrol Honda World Touring Car Team	Honda Civic WTCC		10	+5.222	9	10
6	74	(Spain) Pepe Oriola	Tuenti Racing Team	SEAT León WTCC		10	+11.365	2	8
7	23	(United Kingdom) Tom Chilton	RML	Chevrolet Cruze 1.6T		10	+11.625	6	6
8	9	(United Kingdom) Alex MacDowall	bamboo-engineering	Chevrolet Cruze 1.6T	Y	10	+11.816	5	4
9	25	(Morocco) Mehdi Bennani	Proteam Racing	BMW 320 TC	Y	10	+12.265	11	2
10	55	(Hong Kong) Darryl O'Young	ROAL Motorsport	BMW 320 TC	Y	10	+12.498	21	1
11	26	(Italy) Stefano D'Aste	PB Racing	BMW 320 TC	Y	10	+12.827	16	
12	17	(Denmark) Michel Nykjær	NIKA Racing	Chevrolet Cruze 1.6T	Y	10	+13.768	12	
13	73	(Switzerland) Fredy Barth	Wiechers-Sport	BMW 320 TC	Y	10	+14.651	14	
14	10	(United Kingdom) James Thompson	Lukoil Lada Sport	Lada Granta		10	+18.518	15	
15	38	(Germany) Marc Basseng	ALL-INKL.COM Münnich Motorsport	SEAT León WTCC		10	+19.887	13	
16	19	(Spain) Fernando Monje	Campos Racing	SEAT León WTCC	Y	10	+20.246	18	
17	14	(United Kingdom) James Nash	bamboo-engineering	Chevrolet Cruze 1.6T	Y	10	+22.418	3	
18	22	(United Kingdom) Tom Boardman	Special Tuning Racing	SEAT León WTCC	Y	10	+31.643	23	
19	37	(Germany) René Münnich	ALL-INKL.COM Münnich Motorsport	SEAT León WTCC	Y	10	+32.076	19	
20	8	(Russia) Mikhail Kozlovskiy	Lukoil Lada Sport	Lada Granta		10	+35.472	20	
21	5	(Hungary) Norbert Michelisz	Zengő Motorsport	Honda Civic WTCC		10	+54.663	8	
Ret	7	(Hong Kong) Charles Ng	Liqui Moly Team Engstler	BMW 320 TC	Y	4		17	
Ret	6	(Germany) Franz Engstler	Liqui Moly Team Engstler	BMW 320 TC	Y	2		22	

- **Bold** denotes Fastest lap.

== Standings after the event ==
Drivers' Championship standings

	Pos	Driver	Points
	1	(France) Yvan Muller	120
1	2	(Italy) Gabriele Tarquini	96
1	3	(Denmark) Michel Nykjær	57
	4	(United Kingdom) Tom Chilton	55
	5	(United Kingdom) James Nash	51

Yokohama Independents' Trophy standings

Pos	Driver	Points
1	(United Kingdom) James Nash	46
2	(Denmark) Michel Nykjær	42
3	(United Kingdom) Alex MacDowall	37
4	(Hong Kong) Darryl O'Young	25
5	(Switzerland) Fredy Barth	22

Manufacturers' Championship standings

Pos	Manufacturer	Points
1	(Japan) Honda	240
2	(Russia) Lada	129

- Note: Only the top five positions are included for both sets of drivers' standings.
