= 2013 FIA WTCC Race of Portugal =

Race details
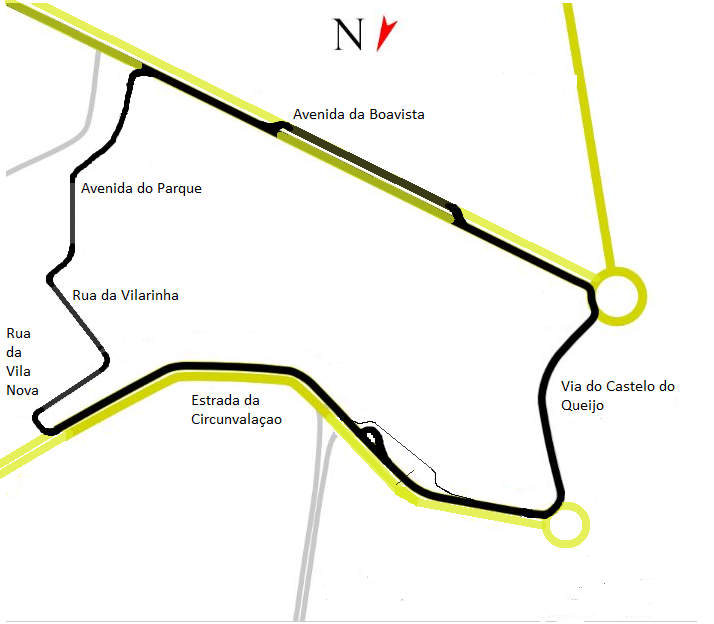
- Round 7 of 12 in the 2013 World Touring Car Championship at Circuito da Boavista in Porto, Portugal.
- Date: 30 June, 2013
- Location: Porto, Portugal
- Course: Circuito da Boavista; 4.800 kilometres (2.983 mi)

Race One
- Laps: 12
Pole position
| Driver | | (France) Yvan Muller | RML |
| Time | | 2:05.347 | |
Podium
| First | | (France) Yvan Muller | RML |
| Second | | (United Kingdom) Tom Chilton | RML |
| Third | | (Denmark) Michel Nykjær | NIKA Racing |
Fastest Lap
| Driver | | (Spain) Pepe Oriola | Tuenti Racing Team |
| Time | | 2:07.228 | |

Race Two
- Laps: 11
Podium
| First | | (United Kingdom) James Nash | bamboo-engineering |
| Second | | (United Kingdom) Robert Huff | Münnich Motorsport |
| Third | | (Denmark) Michel Nykjær | NIKA Racing |
Fastest Lap
| Driver | | (France) Yvan Muller | RML |
| Time | | 2:07.452 | |

The 2013 FIA WTCC Race of Portugal was the seventh round of the 2013 World Touring Car Championship season, the seventh running of the FIA WTCC Race of Portugal and the final European round of the season. It was held on 30 June 2013 at the Circuito da Boavista street circuit in Porto, Portugal.

Race one was won from pole position by Yvan Muller for RML. The second race was won by James Nash driving for bamboo-engineering.

== Background ==
At the halfway point of the season, Yvan Muller was leading the drivers' championship and Michel Nykjær was leading the Yokohama Independents' Trophy.

The Honda Civic WTCCs dropped 30 kg when the compensation weights were revised after the previous round. The BMW 320 TCs received an extra 20 kg of ballast, making them the second heaviest cars on the grid behind the Chevrolets.

Pepe Oriola switched from his SEAT León WTCC to a Chevrolet Cruze 1.6T leased from RML and run by Tuenti Racing Team. Hugo Valente was originally scheduled to miss the Portuguese round but rejoined Campos Racing when a third car was made spare by Oriola's switch to Chevrolet. Tom Boardman also rejoined the field having missed the Austrian and Russian rounds.

== Report ==
=== Free practice ===
ROAL Motorsport's Tom Coronel was fastest in free practice one, leading the Chevrolet pair of Muller and Oriola. The Honda trio led by Gabriele Tarquini were fourth, fifth and sixth while Robert Huff was the leading SEAT driver in seventh. Mikhail Kozlovskiy and Tom Chilton had brushes with the walls during the session while Hugo Valente crashed head–on into the barriers at turn four after missing his braking point.

Muller was the quickest driver in free practice two, over five–tenths quicker than Tarquini in the Honda. The session interrupted early on when Tiago Monteiro suffered an engine problem on his Honda Civic and came to a stop at turn thirteen. Several drivers held the fastest time before Muller put in his best time a few minutes from the end of the session. Kozlovskiy spent much of the session in the pits when he damaged his rear–left wheel while Nikolay Karamyshev crashed at turn twenty at the end of the session.

=== Qualifying ===
With the Circuito da Boavista being a street circuit, Q1 was extended from 20 minutes to 30 minutes and Q2 was extended from 10 minutes to 15 minutes. Alex MacDowall lost control of his Bamboo Engineering Chevrolet during Q1 and spun into one of barriers, he damaged both ends of his car but was able to drive back to the pits. Monteiro was still suffering from turbo problems which had brought his running in free practice two to an early end, he got out in Q1 but ended the session 17th. Fernando Monje had a small collision with a tyre wall which cause some minor damage to the side of his Campos Racing SEAT, Mehdi Bennani had a slow-speed head-on collision in the same place at the end of the session. Kozlovskiy didn't set a time with his car being stuck in the garage for the duration of qualifying due to a damaged subframe.

Q2 was interrupted by a red flag early on when Oriola crashed at turn three. James Thompson had got through to Q2 and on his only run during the session put himself fifth on the grid. Norbert Michelisz was the last driver to set a quick lap but cut a chicane meaning the lap wouldn't count, he ended up fourth on the grid as the quickest Honda. At the end of the session, Muller led a Chevrolet 1–2–3 with Chilton second and Nykjær third. Coronel was tenth in Q2 which would secure him pole position for race two.

The results of qualifying were later amended after a transponder error recorded the wrong times for Tarquini and Oriola in Q2. Tarquini moved up one place to 5th while Oriola moved up from 12th to 6th. Thompson dropped two places to seventh while Huff, Marc Basseng, James Nash and Coronel each dropped one place. This put Nash on pole position for race two. An engine change for Monje sent the Campos Racing driver to the back of the grid for race one.

=== Warm-Up ===
Following the alterations to the qualifying results on Saturday evening, Coronel elected to miss Sunday morning's warm–up session in protest. The ROAL Motorsport team were informed of the change outside of the one-hour window in which they would have been allowed to protest the result.

Zengő Motorsport driver Michelisz led a Honda 1–2 in the fifteen-minute session, factory driver Monteiro was second. Fredy Barth was seventh, he had to pull over early on when the bonnet of his BMW blew open when he left the pit lane.

=== Race One ===
Muller led away from pole position ahead of teammate Chilton, Tarquini and Oriola were soon past Michelisz while Huff got ahead of Thompson. Further around the lap, Boardman tried to pass Bennani at the turn 6 chicane but lost control under braking, cutting across the chicane and collecting Bennani who later retired. Huff was now after Michelisz's sixth place although, on lap two Michelisz ran wide and crashed into the barriers with Huff close behind avoiding the accident. Michelisz attempted to return to the pits to get the car repaired but he struggled with broken suspension on the right side of his car and pulled off further around the lap. Tarquini who had been running fourth dropped out of the race late on with turbo problems, after trying to return to the pits he stopped at turn 13. A recovery truck was out on circuit to recover the stranded car of Tarquini, Barth spun when trying to avoid it while Franz Engstler didn't see the vehicle around the corner at turn 12 and ran into the back of it. The safety car was deployed on lap The race resumed on the last lap, Monteiro passed Nash to take the final points position while Boardman and O'Young collided with Boardman going into the barriers. Up ahead of them, Basseng lost out to Coronel and D'Aste. At the end of the race Muller led a Chevrolet 1–2–3–4 ahead of Chilton, Nykjær and Oriola; Nykjær in third took the independents' victory.

After the race, Valente was given a 30–second time penalty and 10–place grid penalty for the first race in Argentina for ignoring yellow flags and causing a collision. Kozlovskiy and René Münnich were penalised for breaking the speed limit at the rolling start and given a 30–second penalty and a suspended 10–place grid penalty respectively. Boardman was issued with a 30–second penalty and a suspended 10–place grid penalty for his first lap collision with Bennani.

=== Race Two ===
Nash was under attack from Huff and Basseng from the start but maintained the lead while Chilton jumped ahead of Oriola. Oriola re–passed Chilton at the hairpin allowing Muller, Coronel and Bennani also to get through. Nash and Huff broke away from a train of cars led by Basseng, on lap three Nykjær passed Thompson to take fourth place at the final chicane. On lap four Oriola was attempting a pass on Thompson but made a mistake and cut the second chicane, he was required to give the place back on the exit of turn 7, Muller tried to follow Thompson but Oriola shut the door on the RML driver when the pair arrived side–by–side at turn 9. At the end of lap 4 Nykjær took third place from Basseng while lap 5 saw Monje retire with broken suspension along the Avenida Da Boavista. By lap 6 Nykjær was trailing Huff who was staying ahead despite cutting chicanes on a number of occasions, something for which he was later investigated for. On lap eight Oriola passed Thompson just before the final chicane to take fifth place, Thompson then cut the chicane when he was tapped from behind by Muller. Oriola then moved up to fourth on lap 10 when Basseng ran wide across the grass at turn two. Also on that lap, Barth collided head on with one of the barriers at turn eight; his car was left there covered by yellow flags for the remainder of the race. At the end of the race one lap later, Nash took the overall and independents' wins with Huff second and Nykjær third.

== Results ==
=== Qualifying ===
| Pos. | No. | Name | Team | Car | C | Q1 | Q2 | Points |
|---|---|---|---|---|---|---|---|---|
| 1 | 12 | (France) Yvan Muller | RML | Chevrolet Cruze 1.6T | | 2:05.979 | 2:05.347 | **5** |
| 2 | 23 | (United Kingdom) Tom Chilton | RML | Chevrolet Cruze 1.6T | | 2:06.993 | 2:05.545 | **4** |
| 3 | 17 | (Denmark) Michel Nykjær | NIKA Racing | Chevrolet Cruze 1.6T | Y | 2:06.461 | 2:05.977 | **3** |
| 4 | 5 | (Hungary) Norbert Michelisz | Zengő Motorsport | Honda Civic WTCC | | 2:06.876 | 2:06.033 | **2** |
| 5 | 3 | (Italy) Gabriele Tarquini | Castrol Honda World Touring Car Team | Honda Civic WTCC | | 2:06.522 | 2:06.172 | **1** |
| 6 | 74 | (Spain) Pepe Oriola | Tuenti Racing Team | Chevrolet Cruze 1.6T | | 2:07.539 | 2:06.414 | |
| 7 | 10 | (United Kingdom) James Thompson | Lukoil Lada Sport | Lada Granta | | 2:07.449 | 2:06.552 | |
| 8 | 1 | (United Kingdom) Robert Huff | ALL-INKL.COM Münnich Motorsport | SEAT León WTCC | | 2:07.060 | 2:06.660 | |
| 9 | 38 | (Germany) Marc Basseng | ALL-INKL.COM Münnich Motorsport | SEAT León WTCC | | 2:07.442 | 2:06.663 | |
| 10 | 14 | (United Kingdom) **James Nash** | bamboo-engineering | Chevrolet Cruze 1.6T | Y | 2:07.319 | 2:06.902 | |
| 11 | 15 | (Netherlands) Tom Coronel | ROAL Motorsport | BMW 320 TC | | 2:07.299 | 2:06.903 | |
| 12 | 6 | (Germany) Franz Engstler | Liqui Moly Team Engstler | BMW 320 TC | Y | 2:07.386 | 2:07.065 | |
| 13 | 25 | (Morocco) Mehdi Bennani | Proteam Racing | BMW 320 TC | Y | 2:07.560 | | |
| 14 | 26 | (Italy) Stefano D'Aste | PB Racing | BMW 320 TC | Y | 2:08.045 | | |
| 15 | 55 | (Hong Kong) Darryl O'Young | ROAL Motorsport | BMW 320 TC | Y | 2:08.146 | | |
| 16 | 73 | (Switzerland) Fredy Barth | Wiechers-Sport | BMW 320 TC | Y | 2:08.160 | | |
| 17 | 18 | (Portugal) Tiago Monteiro | Castrol Honda World Touring Car Team | Honda Civic WTCC | | 2:08.209 | | |
| 18 | 22 | (United Kingdom) Tom Boardman | Special Tuning Racing | SEAT León WTCC | Y | 2:08.678 | | |
| 19 | 7 | (Hong Kong) Charles Ng | Liqui Moly Team Engstler | BMW 320 TC | Y | 2:08.716 | | |
| 20 | 19 | (Spain) Fernando Monje | Campos Racing | SEAT León WTCC | Y | 2:08.778 | | |
| 21 | 20 | (France) Hugo Valente | Campos Racing | SEAT León WTCC | Y | 2:09.122 | | |
| 22 | 9 | (United Kingdom) Alex MacDowall | bamboo-engineering | Chevrolet Cruze 1.6T | Y | 2:09.361 | | |
| 23 | 21 | (Russia) Nikolay Karamyshev | Campos Racing | SEAT León WTCC | Y | 2:09.551 | | |
| 24 | 37 | (Germany) René Münnich | ALL-INKL.COM Münnich Motorsport | SEAT León WTCC | Y | 2:10.350 | | |
107% time: 2:14.797
| – | 8 | (Russia) Mikhail Kozlovskiy | Lukoil Lada Sport | Lada Granta | | no time set | | |

- **Bold** denotes Pole position for second race.

=== Race 1 ===
| Pos. | No. | Name | Team | Car | C | Laps | Time/Retired | Grid | Points |
|---|---|---|---|---|---|---|---|---|---|
| 1 | 12 | (France) Yvan Muller | RML | Chevrolet Cruze 1.6T | | 12 | 27:38.637 | 1 | 25 |
| 2 | 23 | (United Kingdom) Tom Chilton | RML | Chevrolet Cruze 1.6T | | 12 | +0.343 | 2 | 18 |
| 3 | 17 | (Denmark) Michel Nykjær | NIKA Racing | Chevrolet Cruze 1.6T | Y | 12 | +0.665 | 3 | 15 |
| 4 | 74 | (Spain) **Pepe Oriola** | Tuenti Racing Team | Chevrolet Cruze 1.6T | | 12 | +1.138 | 6 | 12 |
| 5 | 1 | (United Kingdom) Robert Huff | ALL-INKL.COM Münnich Motorsport | SEAT León WTCC | | 12 | +2.493 | 8 | 10 |
| 6 | 10 | (United Kingdom) James Thompson | Lukoil Lada Sport | Lada Granta | | 12 | +3.662 | 7 | 8 |
| 7 | 15 | (Netherlands) Tom Coronel | ROAL Motorsport | BMW 320 TC | | 12 | +6.333 | 11 | 6 |
| 8 | 26 | (Italy) Stefano D'Aste | PB Racing | BMW 320 TC | Y | 12 | +6.416 | 14 | 4 |
| 9 | 18 | (Portugal) Tiago Monteiro | Castrol Honda World Touring Car Team | Honda Civic WTCC | | 12 | +6.977 | 17 | 2 |
| 10 | 38 | (Germany) Marc Basseng | ALL-INKL.COM Münnich Motorsport | SEAT León WTCC | | 12 | +7.576 | 9 | 1 |
| 11 | 14 | (United Kingdom) James Nash | bamboo-engineering | Chevrolet Cruze 1.6T | Y | 12 | +10.632 | 10 | |
| 12 | 55 | (Hong Kong) Darryl O'Young | ROAL Motorsport | BMW 320 TC | Y | 12 | +11.014 | 15 | |
| 13 | 9 | (United Kingdom) Alex MacDowall | bamboo-engineering | Chevrolet Cruze 1.6T | Y | 12 | +11.953 | 21 | |
| 14 | 7 | (Hong Kong) Charles Ng | Liqui Moly Team Engstler | BMW 320 TC | Y | 12 | +12.291 | 19 | |
| 15 | 19 | (Spain) Fernando Monje | Campos Racing | SEAT León WTCC | Y | 12 | +12.842 | 24 | |
| 16 | 21 | (Russia) Nikolay Karamyshev | Campos Racing | SEAT León WTCC | Y | 12 | +13.234 | 22 | |
| 17 | 73 | (Switzerland) Fredy Barth | Wiechers-Sport | BMW 320 TC | Y | 12 | +13.736 | 16 | |
| 18 | 20 | (France) Hugo Valente | Campos Racing | SEAT León WTCC | Y | 12 | +41.485 | 20 | |
| 19 | 8 | (Russia) Mikhail Kozlovskiy | Lukoil Lada Sport | Lada Granta | | 12 | +1:03.630 | 25 | |
| 20 | 22 | (United Kingdom) Tom Boardman | Special Tuning Racing | SEAT León WTCC | Y | 11 | +1 Lap | 18 | |
| 21 | 6 | (Germany) Franz Engstler | Liqui Moly Team Engstler | BMW 320 TC | Y | 9 | +3 Laps | 12 | |
| Ret | 37 | (Germany) René Münnich | ALL-INKL.COM Münnich Motorsport | SEAT León WTCC | Y | 8 | | 23 | |
| Ret | 3 | (Italy) Gabriele Tarquini | Castrol Honda World Touring Car Team | Honda Civic WTCC | | 7 | Turbo | 5 | |
| Ret | 25 | (Morocco) Mehdi Bennani | Proteam Racing | BMW 320 TC | Y | 3 | Race incident | 13 | |
| Ret | 5 | (Hungary) Norbert Michelisz | Zengő Motorsport | Honda Civic WTCC | | 1 | Race incident | 4 | |

- **Bold** denotes Fastest lap.

=== Race 2 ===
| Pos. | No. | Name | Team | Car | C | Laps | Time/Retired | Grid | Points |
|---|---|---|---|---|---|---|---|---|---|
| 1 | 14 | (United Kingdom) James Nash | bamboo-engineering | Chevrolet Cruze 1.6T | Y | 11 | 23:41.247 | 1 | 25 |
| 2 | 1 | (United Kingdom) Robert Huff | ALL-INKL.COM Münnich Motorsport | SEAT León WTCC | | 11 | +5.624 | 3 | 18 |
| 3 | 17 | (Denmark) Michel Nykjær | NIKA Racing | Chevrolet Cruze 1.6T | Y | 11 | +6.012 | 6 | 15 |
| 4 | 74 | (Spain) Pepe Oriola | Tuenti Racing Team | Chevrolet Cruze 1.6T | | 11 | +6.368 | 5 | 12 |
| 5 | 38 | (Germany) Marc Basseng | ALL-INKL.COM Münnich Motorsport | SEAT León WTCC | | 11 | +7.946 | 2 | 10 |
| 6 | 10 | (United Kingdom) James Thompson | Lukoil Lada Sport | Lada Granta | | 11 | +8.683 | 4 | 8 |
| 7 | 12 | (France) **Yvan Muller** | RML | Chevrolet Cruze 1.6T | | 11 | +9.336 | 8 | 6 |
| 8 | 15 | (Netherlands) Tom Coronel | ROAL Motorsport | BMW 320 TC | | 11 | +9.805 | 9 | 4 |
| 9 | 23 | (United Kingdom) Tom Chilton | RML | Chevrolet Cruze 1.6T | | 11 | +10.178 | 7 | 2 |
| 10 | 25 | (Morocco) Mehdi Bennani | Proteam Racing | BMW 320 TC | Y | 11 | +10.669 | 10 | 1 |
| 11 | 18 | (Portugal) Tiago Monteiro | Castrol Honda World Touring Car Team | Honda Civic WTCC | | 11 | +11.019 | 14 | |
| 12 | 26 | (Italy) Stefano D'Aste | PB Racing | BMW 320 TC | Y | 11 | +11.560 | 11 | |
| 13 | 55 | (Hong Kong) Darryl O'Young | ROAL Motorsport | BMW 320 TC | Y | 11 | +15.262 | 12 | |
| 14 | 20 | (France) Hugo Valente | Campos Racing | SEAT León WTCC | Y | 11 | +23.847 | 17 | |
| 15 | 7 | (Hong Kong) Charles Ng | Liqui Moly Team Engstler | BMW 320 TC | Y | 11 | +30.812 | 15 | |
| 16 | 21 | (Russia) Nikolay Karamyshev | Campos Racing | SEAT León WTCC | Y | 11 | +31.836 | 19 | |
| 17 | 9 | (United Kingdom) Alex MacDowall | bamboo-engineering | Chevrolet Cruze 1.6T | Y | 11 | +32.306 | 18 | |
| 18 | 6 | (Germany) Franz Engstler | Liqui Moly Team Engstler | BMW 320 TC | Y | 11 | +33.542 | 22 | |
| 19 | 8 | (Russia) Mikhail Kozlovskiy | Lukoil Lada Sport | Lada Granta | | 11 | +34.673 | 25 | |
| 20 | 3 | (Italy) Gabriele Tarquini | Castrol Honda World Touring Car Team | Honda Civic WTCC | | 11 | +36.144 | 21 | |
| 21 | 73 | (Switzerland) Fredy Barth | Wiechers-Sport | BMW 320 TC | Y | 9 | +2 Laps | 13 | |
| Ret | 37 | (Germany) René Münnich | ALL-INKL.COM Münnich Motorsport | SEAT León WTCC | Y | 7 | | 24 | |
| Ret | 19 | (Spain) Fernando Monje | Campos Racing | SEAT León WTCC | Y | 4 | Race incident | 16 | |
| DNS | 22 | (United Kingdom) Tom Boardman | Special Tuning Racing | SEAT León WTCC | Y | 0 | Did not start | 23 | |
| DNS | 5 | (Hungary) Norbert Michelisz | Zengő Motorsport | Honda Civic WTCC | | 0 | Did not start | 20 | |

- **Bold** denotes Fastest lap.

== Standings after the event ==
Drivers' Championship standings

| | Pos | Driver | Points |
|---|---|---|---|
| | 1 | (France) Yvan Muller | 282 |
| 1 | 2 | (Denmark) Michel Nykjær | 160 |
| 1 | 3 | (United Kingdom) James Nash | 138 |
| 1 | 4 | (United Kingdom) Robert Huff | 135 |
| 3 | 5 | (Italy) Gabriele Tarquini | 134 |

Yokohama Independents' Trophy standings

| Pos | Driver | Points |
|---|---|---|
| 1 | (Denmark) Michel Nykjær | 112 |
| 2 | (United Kingdom) James Nash | 108 |
| 3 | (United Kingdom) Alex MacDowall | 78 |
| 4 | (Morocco) Mehdi Bennani | 60 |
| 5 | (Italy) Stefano D'Aste | 51 |

Manufacturers' Championship standings

| Pos | Manufacturer | Points |
|---|---|---|
| 1 | (Japan) Honda | 566 |
| 2 | (Russia) Lada | 366 |

- Note: Only the top five positions are included for both sets of drivers' standings.
