= 2013 FIA WTCC Race of Morocco =

Race details
- Round 2 of 12 in the 2013 World Touring Car Championship at Marrakech Street Circuit in Marrakesh, Morocco.
- Date: 7 April, 2013
- Location: Marrakesh, Morocco
- Course: Marrakech Street Circuit; 4.545 kilometres (2.824 mi)

Race One
- Laps: 13
Pole position
Driver		(Italy) Gabriele Tarquini	Castrol Honda Team
Time		1:44.358	
Podium
First		(Denmark) Michel Nykjær	NIKA Racing
Second		(Italy) Gabriele Tarquini	Castrol Honda Team
Third		(United Kingdom) James Nash	bamboo-engineering
Fastest Lap
Driver		(United Kingdom) Alex MacDowall	bamboo-engineering
Time		1:46.237	

Race Two
- Laps: 13
Podium
First		(Spain) Pepe Oriola	Tuenti Racing Team
Second		(France) Yvan Muller	RML
Third		(United Kingdom) Tom Chilton	RML
Fastest Lap
Driver		(United Kingdom) Tom Chilton	RML
Time		1:45.545	

The 2013 FIA WTCC Race of Morocco was the second round of the 2013 World Touring Car Championship season and the fourth running of the FIA WTCC Race of Morocco. It was held on 7 April 2013 at the Marrakech Street Circuit in Marrakesh, Morocco.

Both races were won by first time victors in the World Touring Car Championship, race one was won by Michel Nykjær of NIKA Racing and race two was won by Pepe Oriola of Tuenti Racing Team who also became the youngest winner of a WTCC race.

== Background ==
After the first round at Monza, RML driver Yvan Muller was leading the drivers' championship. James Nash was leading the Yokohama Independents' Trophy.

After the qualifying incident at Monza, Lukoil Lada Sport replaced Aleksei Dudukalo with series rookie Mikhail Kozlovskiy. Jean-Philippe Dayraut and the ANOME team were not on the entry list for Marrakesh.

== Report ==
=== Testing and free practice ===
A test session had been scheduled for Friday afternoon but was cancelled along with activities for the support races when heavy rain flooded the circuit, the lost half–hour session would not be replaced.

Muller led the dry first free practice session on Saturday morning with teammate Tom Chilton third, the pair separated by the Honda of Gabriele Tarquini who had set the pace earlier on. Norbert Michelisz was fourth in the independent Honda ahead of James Thompson in the leading Lada. Tom Coronel was sixth as the fastest BMW while Fernando Monje in tenth was the quickest SEAT. There were no improved times in the final minutes of the session due to yellow flags at the final hairpin brought out by Tom Boardman who had stopped on the circuit.

Muller led an RML 1–2 in the second practice session with Alex MacDowall making it three Chevrolets at the top of the times. There was a small fire on Michelisz's car in the pit lane while SEAT drivers Boardman and Robert Huff completed a limited number of laps due to car problems.

=== Qualifying ===
Qualifying was delayed by an hour as a result of the cancellation of all Friday running for the support races.

Tarquini took the first pole position for the Castrol Honda World Touring Car Team ahead of the bamboo-engineering Chevrolet of Nash. The first part of qualifying was led by Tarquini, whose teammate Tiago Monteiro brought out the red flags halfway through the session when he hit one of the walls at the second chicane. The ROAL Motorsport drivers collided towards the end of the session, Darryl O'Young had given Tom Coronel a tow to get the Dutch driver through to Q2, Coronel then got his braking wrong at turn ten and ran into the back of O'Young. Thompson collided with one of the walls on the street circuit and damaged his front left corner, although he was through to the second session he would not be able to set a time due to the damage sustained.

Tarquini spent most of Q2 at the top of timing pages, Chilton looked set to take pole position when he came across the slow moving Campos Racing car of Fernando Monje who had just left the pits. Chilton and the train of cars behind him were forced to abandon their flying laps. The grid order was therefore decided by times set earlier in the session, Tarquini was ahead of five Chevrolets with Nash second, Muller and Michel Nykjær on row two with Chilton and MacDowall on row three. The ALL-INKL.COM Münnich Motorsport cars of Huff and Marc Basseng were on row four, Pepe Oriola was ninth and Monje in tenth would start on pole position for race two. Coronel and Thompson didn't set times in Q2.

=== Warm-Up ===
Chilton led the warm–up session on Sunday morning. The red flags came out twice, firstly when Nykjær clipped the kerbs at the second chicane and stopped in the middle of the track. The second stoppage brought warm–up to an early end when Boardman appeared to suffer a brake failure, clipping the front of MacDowall's Chevrolet and colliding head–on with the barriers at the final chicane.

Boardman was later ruled out of the races as a result of the damage sustained in the warm–up crash.

=== Race One ===
Tarquini led away from pole position while Nykjær moved into second place ahead of Nash. Huff had moved up to fifth place behind Muller and eventually managed to pass the RML driver, the pair then spent the next couple of places fighting over the position. Muller eventually got ahead at the final hairpin and Huff lost more places. Chilton pulled into the pit lane on lap six due to overheating resulting for damage. Nykjær and Nash were disputing second place behind Tarquini, Nykjær was then able to pass Tarquini moments before the yellow flags came out after Monteiro crashed into one of the barriers and the safety car was deployed. Nash ignored the yellow flags and passed Tarquini for second place, he then tried to hand the position back on the main straight behind the safety car but it wasn't until the following lap when the pair swapped positions. The race resumed with two laps to go, the main battle was for the final podium spot with Muller chasing Nash. Muller made a number of attempts to take the place but Nash successfully defended the place to take his first podium finish. Up ahead Nykjær claimed his first overall victory in the WTCC ahead of Tarquini.

=== Race Two ===
Monje was on pole but was passed on the opening lap by Oriola. Monje was involved a collision with the Lada of Thompson although both cars were removed under yellow flags. Towards the end of the first lap, Huff made contact with Monje and broke his right front suspension. Monje was then out on lap two when he collided with the Lada of Thompson. The safety car came out on lap nine when Tarquini lost control of his car over the kerbs at one of the chicanes and collided with MacDowall, putting both out of the race. The race resumed on the final lap with Oriola holding off Muller and Chilton to claim his first WTCC victory and become the youngest winner and the championship's history, Nash in fourth was the independents' winner.

After the race, Monje was given a five–place grid penalty at the next race in Slovakia for his collision with Thompson.

== Results ==
=== Qualifying ===
Pos.	No.	Name	Team	Car	C	Q1	Q2	Points
1	3	(Italy) Gabriele Tarquini	Castrol Honda World Touring Car Team	Honda Civic WTCC		1:44.910	1:44.358	**5**
2	14	(United Kingdom) James Nash	bamboo-engineering	Chevrolet Cruze 1.6T	Y	1:45.677	1:44.406	**4**
3	12	(France) Yvan Muller	RML	Chevrolet Cruze 1.6T		1:45.185	1:44.504	**3**
4	17	(Denmark) Michel Nykjær	NIKA Racing	Chevrolet Cruze 1.6T	Y	1:45.656	1:44.745	**2**
5	23	(United Kingdom) Tom Chilton	RML	Chevrolet Cruze 1.6T		1:45.471	1:44.863	**1**
6	9	(United Kingdom) Alex MacDowall	bamboo-engineering	Chevrolet Cruze 1.6T	Y	1:45.446	1:45.060	
7	1	(United Kingdom) Robert Huff	ALL-INKL.COM Münnich Motorsport	SEAT León WTCC		1:46.125	1:45.228	
8	38	(Germany) Marc Basseng	ALL-INKL.COM Münnich Motorsport	SEAT León WTCC		1:45.794	1:45.552	
9	74	(Spain) Pepe Oriola	Tuenti Racing Team	SEAT León WTCC		1:45.617	1:46.341	
10	19	(Spain) **Fernando Monje**	Campos Racing	SEAT León WTCC	Y	1:46.194	1:55.405	
11	10	(United Kingdom) James Thompson	Lukoil Lada Sport	Lada Granta		1:45.992	no time set	
12	15	(Netherlands) Tom Coronel	ROAL Motorsport	BMW 320 TC		1:46.091	no time set	
13	55	(Hong Kong) Darryl O'Young	ROAL Motorsport	BMW 320 TC	Y	1:46.327		
14	18	(Portugal) Tiago Monteiro	Castrol Honda World Touring Car Team	Honda Civic WTCC		1:46.396		
15	73	(Switzerland) Fredy Barth	Wiechers-Sport	BMW 320 TC	Y	1:46.412		
16	6	(Germany) Franz Engstler	Liqui Moly Team Engstler	BMW 320 TC	Y	1:46.494		
17	5	(Hungary) Norbert Michelisz	Zengő Motorsport	Honda Civic WTCC		1:46.629		
18	25	(Morocco) Mehdi Bennani	Proteam Racing	BMW 320 TC	Y	1:46.660		
19	22	(United Kingdom) Tom Boardman	Special Tuning Racing	SEAT León WTCC	Y	1:46.713		
20	7	(Hong Kong) Charles Ng	Liqui Moly Team Engstler	BMW 320 TC	Y	1:47.140		
21	26	(Italy) Stefano D'Aste	PB Racing	BMW 320 TC	Y	1:47.390		
22	8	(Russia) Mikhail Kozlovskiy	Lukoil Lada Sport	Lada Granta		1:47.598		
23	37	(Germany) René Münnich	ALL-INKL.COM Münnich Motorsport	SEAT León WTCC	Y	1:49.222		

- **Bold** denotes Pole position for second race.

=== Race 1 ===
Pos.	No.	Name	Team	Car	C	Laps	Time/Retired	Grid	Points
1	17	(Denmark) Michel Nykjær	NIKA Racing	Chevrolet Cruze 1.6T	Y	13	28:51.561	4	25
2	3	(Italy) Gabriele Tarquini	Castrol Honda World Touring Car Team	Honda Civic WTCC		13	+0.566	1	18
3	14	(United Kingdom) James Nash	bamboo-engineering	Chevrolet Cruze 1.6T	Y	13	+1.612	2	15
4	12	(France) Yvan Muller	RML	Chevrolet Cruze 1.6T		13	+2.224	3	12
5	1	(United Kingdom) Robert Huff	ALL-INKL.COM Münnich Motorsport	SEAT León WTCC		13	+2.248	7	10
6	9	(United Kingdom) **Alex MacDowall**	bamboo-engineering	Chevrolet Cruze 1.6T	Y	13	+2.476	6	8
7	38	(Germany) Marc Basseng	ALL-INKL.COM Münnich Motorsport	SEAT León WTCC		13	+3.201	8	6
8	74	(Spain) Pepe Oriola	Tuenti Racing Team	SEAT León WTCC		13	+3.565	9	4
9	15	(Netherlands) Tom Coronel	ROAL Motorsport	BMW 320 TC		13	+5.270	12	2
10	10	(United Kingdom) James Thompson	Lukoil Lada Sport	Lada Granta		13	+5.881	11	1
11	19	(Spain) Fernando Monje	Campos Racing	SEAT León WTCC	Y	13	+7.078	10	
12	55	(Hong Kong) Darryl O'Young	ROAL Motorsport	BMW 320 TC	Y	13	+7.879	13	
13	73	(Switzerland) Fredy Barth	Wiechers-Sport	BMW 320 TC	Y	13	+8.485	15	
14	7	(Hong Kong) Charles Ng	Liqui Moly Team Engstler	BMW 320 TC	Y	13	+9.298	19	
15	37	(Germany) René Münnich	ALL-INKL.COM Münnich Motorsport	SEAT León WTCC	Y	13	+14.192	22	
16	8	(Russia) Mikhail Kozlovskiy	Lukoil Lada Sport	Lada Granta		13	+15.333	21	
17	6	(Germany) Franz Engstler	Liqui Moly Team Engstler	BMW 320 TC	Y	13	+33.246	16	
18	25	(Morocco) Mehdi Bennani	Proteam Racing	BMW 320 TC	Y	12	+1 Lap	18	
Ret	18	(Portugal) Tiago Monteiro	Castrol Honda World Touring Car Team	Honda Civic WTCC		5	Race incident	14	
Ret	5	(Hungary) Norbert Michelisz	Zengő Motorsport	Honda Civic WTCC		5	Race incident	17	
Ret	23	(United Kingdom) Tom Chilton	RML	Chevrolet Cruze 1.6T		5	Overheating	5	
Ret	26	(Italy) Stefano D'Aste	PB Racing	BMW 320 TC	Y	1	Race incident	20	
DNS	22	(United Kingdom) Tom Boardman	Special Tuning Racing	SEAT León WTCC	Y	0	Did not start	23	

- **Bold** denotes Fastest lap.

=== Race 2 ===
Pos.	No.	Name	Team	Car	C	Laps	Time/Retired	Grid	Points
1	74	(Spain) Pepe Oriola	Tuenti Racing Team	SEAT León WTCC		13	28:08.751	2	25
2	12	(France) Yvan Muller	RML	Chevrolet Cruze 1.6T		13	+0.430	8	18
3	23	(United Kingdom) **Tom Chilton**	RML	Chevrolet Cruze 1.6T		13	+0.677	6	15
4	14	(United Kingdom) James Nash	bamboo-engineering	Chevrolet Cruze 1.6T	Y	13	+0.948	9	12
5	38	(Germany) Marc Basseng	ALL-INKL.COM Münnich Motorsport	SEAT León WTCC		13	+1.808	3	10
6	15	(Netherlands) Tom Coronel	ROAL Motorsport	BMW 320 TC		13	+2.028	12	8
7	17	(Denmark) Michel Nykjær	NIKA Racing	Chevrolet Cruze 1.6T	Y	13	+2.326	7	6
8	6	(Germany) Franz Engstler	Liqui Moly Team Engstler	BMW 320 TC	Y	13	+4.377	16	4
9	55	(Hong Kong) Darryl O'Young	ROAL Motorsport	BMW 320 TC	Y	13	+4.889	13	2
10	7	(Hong Kong) Charles Ng	Liqui Moly Team Engstler	BMW 320 TC	Y	13	+6.273	18	1
11	25	(Morocco) Mehdi Bennani	Proteam Racing	BMW 320 TC	Y	13	+6.349	17	
12	73	(Switzerland) Fredy Barth	Wiechers-Sport	BMW 320 TC	Y	13	+6.385	15	
13	8	(Russia) Mikhail Kozlovskiy	Lukoil Lada Sport	Lada Granta		13	+7.037	19	
14	26	(Italy) Stefano D'Aste	PB Racing	BMW 320 TC	Y	13	+7.698	22	
15	5	(Hungary) Norbert Michelisz	Zengő Motorsport	Honda Civic WTCC		9	Fuel leak	21	
Ret	3	(Italy) Gabriele Tarquini	Castrol Honda World Touring Car Team	Honda Civic WTCC		7	Race incident	10	
Ret	9	(United Kingdom) Alex MacDowall	bamboo-engineering	Chevrolet Cruze 1.6T	Y	7	Race incident	5	
Ret	37	(Germany) René Münnich	ALL-INKL.COM Münnich Motorsport	SEAT León WTCC	Y	3	Puncture	20	
Ret	1	(United Kingdom) Robert Huff	ALL-INKL.COM Münnich Motorsport	SEAT León WTCC		1	Race incident	4	
Ret	10	(United Kingdom) James Thompson	Lukoil Lada Sport	Lada Granta		1	Race incident	11	
Ret	19	(Spain) Fernando Monje	Campos Racing	SEAT León WTCC	Y	1	Race incident	1	
DNS	18	(Portugal) Tiago Monteiro	Castrol Honda World Touring Car Team	Honda Civic WTCC		0	Did not start	14	
DNS	22	(United Kingdom) Tom Boardman	Special Tuning Racing	SEAT León WTCC	Y	0	Did not start	–	

- **Bold** denotes Fastest lap.

== Standings after the event ==
Drivers' Championship standings

	Pos	Driver	Points
	1	(France) Yvan Muller	88
2	2	(Denmark) Michel Nykjær	51
	3	(Italy) Gabriele Tarquini	51
2	4	(United Kingdom) Tom Chilton	48
3	5	(United Kingdom) James Nash	43

Yokohama Independents' Trophy standings

	Pos	Driver	Points
	1	(United Kingdom) James Nash	35
1	2	(Denmark) Michel Nykjær	29
1	3	(United Kingdom) Alex MacDowall	20
1	4	(Hong Kong) Darryl O'Young	17
1	5	(Switzerland) Fredy Barth	13

Manufacturers' Championship standings

Pos	Manufacturer	Points
1	(Japan) Honda	145
2	(Russia) Lada	70

- Note: Only the top five positions are included for both sets of drivers' standings.
