= 2013 FIA WTCC Race of Argentina =

Race details
- Round 8 of 12 in the 2013 World Touring Car Championship at Autódromo Termas de Río Hondo in Termas de Río Hondo, Argentina.
- Date: 4 August, 2013
- Location: Termas de Río Hondo, Argentina
- Course: Autódromo Termas de Río Hondo; 4.806 kilometres (2.986 mi)

Race One
- Laps: 12
Pole position
Driver		(France) Yvan Muller	RML
Time		1:47.920	
Podium
First		(France) Yvan Muller	RML
Second		(Spain) Pepe Oriola	Tuenti Racing Team
Third		(United Kingdom) Tom Chilton	RML
Fastest Lap
Driver		(France) Yvan Muller	RML
Time		1:50.524	

Race Two
- Laps: 11
Podium
First		(Argentina) José María López	Wiechers-Sport
Second		(Italy) Gabriele Tarquini	Castrol Honda Team
Third		(Spain) Pepe Oriola	Tuenti Racing Team
Fastest Lap
Driver		(France) Yvan Muller	RML
Time		1:50.248	

The 2013 FIA WTCC Race of Argentina was the eighth round of the 2013 World Touring Car Championship season and the maiden running of the FIA WTCC Race of Argentina. It was held on 4 August 2013 at the Autódromo Termas de Río Hondo in Termas de Río Hondo, Santiago del Estero Province, Argentina.

Race one was won by Yvan Muller for RML while race two was won by local driver José María López on his debut weekend in the World Touring Car Championship while driving for Wiechers-Sport.

== Background ==
Muller was leading the drivers' championship by 122 points over Michel Nykjær who was leading the Yokohama Independents' Trophy.

The Honda Civic WTCCs, SEAT León WTCCs and BMW 320 TCs lost all additional ballast when the compensation weights were re-calculated. The Chevrolet Cruzes retained their 40 kg of ballast while the Lada Grantas remained 20 kg below the baseweight.

José María López joined Wiechers-Sport for the round, substituting for regular driver Fredy Barth. Following heavy damage sustained in the previous round, Tom Boardman and the Special Tuning Racing team elected to skip the Race of Argentina to repair the car before shipping to the United States.

Campos Racing's Hugo Valente came to the event with a 10–place grid penalty for race one after ignoring yellow flags in race one in Portugal.

== Report ==
=== Testing and free practice ===
Muller led an RML 1–2 in Friday's test session, López was eleventh quickest in his first WTCC session.

Muller and teammate Tom Chilton were first and second once again in free practice one, Tiago Monteiro was third for Honda and fourth placed López was the quickest independent driver. The session had been red flagged early on when a technical failure cut off the timing and video systems.

Chilton led a Chevrolet 1–2–3 in free practice two ahead of Muller and bamboo-engineering's Alex MacDowall. The session was red flagged when René Münnich got his Münnich Motorsport SEAT stuck in a gravel trap. His teammate Robert Huff stopped on the track three minutes from the end as a result of a suspected turbocharger failure. Münnich Motorsport were forced to change the engine in Huff's car after free practice two, earning the reigning champion a penalty which would see him start at the back of the grid for race one. Monteiro would also be sent to the back of the grid for race one following an engine change.

=== Qualifying ===
Nykjær led the cars out at the start of Q1, Muller then went to the top of the times straight away while MacDowall was the first driver to go off the track. López was running as high as third during the session while for a brief time both Lukoil Lada Sport cars were inside the top twelve before Mikhail Kozlovskiy was bumped down the order by improvements for other drivers, notably James Nash and Marc Basseng. After lengthy repairs, Huff left the pits in time to do one flying lap which was only good enough for 14th, putting him out of qualifying. Valente was the only SEAT driver to get through to Q2 when Basseng was displaced by Nash while López was the only BMW driver to do so. A misunderstanding between the ROAL Motorsport pair of Tom Coronel and Darryl O'Young saw the pair eliminated from qualifying in the first session.

After a short break, Q2 began and Muller went to the top of the times once again. A group of cars formed up for a final flying lap at the end of the session with both Muller and Chilton improving their times; Muller stayed on top while Chilton was second despite an off at the final corner. Pepe Oriola was the other driver to go off on the final tour. López had caught up with the back of the train of cars which was driving slowly around the circuit before going off on a final fast lap but he still finished tenth to secure pole position for race two.

After qualifying, Muller, Chilton, Nash, MacDowall, Tarquini, Monteiro and Oriola were called to the stewards to explain the slow train of cars at the end of Q2 but no further action was taken. Kozlovskiy was lost all his lap times for a breach of parc fermé regulations when a laptop was connected to his car.

=== Warm-Up ===
López was quickest in the warm–up session on Sunday morning, edging out the Chevrolet of MacDowall. Huff was third while Kozlovskiy was fourth for Lada.

=== Race One ===
Muller was on pole position for the first race, the first attempt at the rolling start was aborted when second placed Chilton failed to drive through the grid boxes. The race was started when the cars came around again, Chilton ran wide at the first corner and lost places to Nykjær and Oriola. On lap five Chilton reclaimed second place ahead of Oriola. Michelisz lost his front splitter following collisions with Nykjær and Nash which caused the three of them to slow down allowing Tarquini to move past the group into fourth place. López was also able to catch up with them having run in a distant 8th place and he picked them off one–by–one to finish 5th. Oriola passed Chilton at the end of the race to split with RML cars, Muller won by a comfortable margin of 4.9 seconds ahead of Oriola. López in fifth was the Yokohama Trophy winner in his first WTCC race while Huff and Monteiro came through from the back of the grid to score points in 8th and 10th respectively.

=== Race Two ===
López started on pole position for the second race and maintained his first place at the start, at the end of the first lap he had built up a lead of 1.8 seconds ahead of Monteiro. Nykjær separated the Hondas as Tarquini was running fourth, by the end of the second lap Muller had closed in on the trio fighting for second place. Tarquini tried a move on Nykjær at turn thirteen, he ran wide and Nykjær did likewise trying to defend which allowed Muller and Nash through while Tarquini was now battling with Oriola and Michelisz for 6th place. On lap three Nykjær tried to dive up the inside of Nash at turn seven but the pair collided and allowed Tarquini through while MacDowall and Chilton collided further back. Monteiro was running second ahead of Muller on lap five and the pair were closing in on López when Muller ran into the back of him in the braking area for turn five, putting Monteiro off the road and dropping the Honda driver down to ninth once he had recovered to the track. On the same lap Huff was disputing sixth place with Michelisz; there was light contact between the pair before Huff dropped back slightly into Thompson who then bumped the SEAT and broke its front left suspension causing Huff to go off into the gravel. On lap seven Muller was issued with a drive–through penalty for his collision with Monteiro which was served immediately. O'Young and Valente came together on lap nine, they had been contesting eighth place until Valente tapped the back of the ROAL BMW and O'Young spun off the circuit. Thompson had been running behind them but one lap later he slowed down with technical problems. At the end of lap eleven López passed the checkered flag to take his first overall WTCC victory and the first WTCC victory for an Argentine driver, Tarquini and Oriola completed the podium.

== Results ==
=== Qualifying ===
Pos.	No.	Name	Team	Car	C	Q1	Q2	Points
1	12	(France) Yvan Muller	RML	Chevrolet Cruze 1.6T		1:49.158	1:47.920	**5**
2	23	(United Kingdom) Tom Chilton	RML	Chevrolet Cruze 1.6T		1:49.690	1:48.423	**4**
3	5	(Hungary) Norbert Michelisz	Zengő Motorsport	Honda Civic WTCC		1:49.247	1:48.855	**3**
4	3	(Italy) Gabriele Tarquini	Castrol Honda World Touring Car Team	Honda Civic WTCC		1:49.545	1:48.919	**2**
5	74	(Spain) Pepe Oriola	Tuenti Racing Team	Chevrolet Cruze 1.6T		1:49.762	1:48.979	**1**
6	9	(United Kingdom) Alex MacDowall	bamboo-engineering	Chevrolet Cruze 1.6T	Y	1:50.132	1:49.039	
7	18	(Portugal) Tiago Monteiro	Castrol Honda World Touring Car Team	Honda Civic WTCC		1:49.517	1:49.177	
8	14	(United Kingdom) James Nash	bamboo-engineering	Chevrolet Cruze 1.6T	Y	1:49.938	1:49.236	
9	17	(Denmark) Michel Nykjær	NIKA Racing	Chevrolet Cruze 1.6T	Y	1:49.252	1:49.406	
10	72	(Argentina) **José María López**	Wiechers-Sport	BMW 320 TC	Y	1:49.819	1:49.674	
11	20	(France) Hugo Valente	Campos Racing	SEAT León WTCC	Y	1:50.212	1:50.130	
12	10	(United Kingdom) James Thompson	Lukoil Lada Sport	Lada Granta		1:49.953	1:50.353	
13	38	(Germany) Marc Basseng	ALL-INKL.COM Münnich Motorsport	SEAT León WTCC		1:50.272		
14	1	(United Kingdom) Robert Huff	ALL-INKL.COM Münnich Motorsport	SEAT León WTCC		1:50.314		
15	19	(Spain) Fernando Monje	Campos Racing	SEAT León WTCC	Y	1:50.583		
16	15	(Netherlands) Tom Coronel	ROAL Motorsport	BMW 320 TC		1:50.744		
17	26	(Italy) Stefano D'Aste	PB Racing	BMW 320 TC	Y	1:50.788		
18	7	(Hong Kong) Charles Ng	Liqui Moly Team Engstler	BMW 320 TC	Y	1:51.328		
19	55	(Hong Kong) Darryl O'Young	ROAL Motorsport	BMW 320 TC	Y	1:51.345		
20	37	(Germany) René Münnich	ALL-INKL.COM Münnich Motorsport	SEAT León WTCC	Y	1:51.368		
21	25	(Morocco) Mehdi Bennani	Proteam Racing	BMW 320 TC	Y	1:51.862		
22	6	(Germany) Franz Engstler	Liqui Moly Team Engstler	BMW 320 TC	Y	1:51.866		
107% time: 1:56.799
EX^{1}	8	(Russia) Mikhail Kozlovskiy	Lukoil Lada Sport	Lada Granta		Excluded		

- **Bold** denotes Pole position for second race.

^1 Kozlovskiy had all of his times from qualifying deleted after a breach of parc fermé regulations after Q1.

=== Race 1 ===
Pos.	No.	Name	Team	Car	C	Laps	Time/Retired	Grid	Points
1	12	(France) **Yvan Muller**	RML	Chevrolet Cruze 1.6T		12	22:56.896	1	25
2	74	(Spain) Pepe Oriola	Tuenti Racing Team	Chevrolet Cruze 1.6T		12	+4.924	5	18
3	23	(United Kingdom) Tom Chilton	RML	Chevrolet Cruze 1.6T		12	+7.813	2	15
4	3	(Italy) Gabriele Tarquini	Castrol Honda World Touring Car Team	Honda Civic WTCC		12	+7.989	4	12
5	72	(Argentina) José María López	Wiechers-Sport	BMW 320 TC	Y	12	+8.846	9	10
6	17	(Denmark) Michel Nykjær	NIKA Racing	Chevrolet Cruze 1.6T	Y	12	+10.214	8	8
7	5	(Hungary) Norbert Michelisz	Zengő Motorsport	Honda Civic WTCC		12	+12.833	3	6
8	1	(United Kingdom) Robert Huff	ALL-INKL.COM Münnich Motorsport	SEAT León WTCC		12	+13.960	23	4
9	14	(United Kingdom) James Nash	bamboo-engineering	Chevrolet Cruze 1.6T	Y	12	+14.636	7	2
10	18	(Portugal) Tiago Monteiro	Castrol Honda World Touring Car Team	Honda Civic WTCC		12	+14.870	22	1
11	9	(United Kingdom) Alex MacDowall	bamboo-engineering	Chevrolet Cruze 1.6T	Y	12	+15.743	6	
12	38	(Germany) Marc Basseng	ALL-INKL.COM Münnich Motorsport	SEAT León WTCC		12	+16.619	11	
13	20	(France) Hugo Valente	Campos Racing	SEAT León WTCC	Y	12	+17.333	20	
14	26	(Italy) Stefano D'Aste	PB Racing	BMW 320 TC	Y	12	+19.858	14	
15	55	(Hong Kong) Darryl O'Young	ROAL Motorsport	BMW 320 TC	Y	12	+20.247	16	
16	19	(Spain) Fernando Monje	Campos Racing	SEAT León WTCC	Y	12	+23.563	12	
17	7	(Hong Kong) Charles Ng	Liqui Moly Team Engstler	BMW 320 TC	Y	12	+23.782	15	
18	37	(Germany) René Münnich	ALL-INKL.COM Münnich Motorsport	SEAT León WTCC	Y	12	+30.675	17	
19	6	(Germany) Franz Engstler	Liqui Moly Team Engstler	BMW 320 TC	Y	12	+33.536	19	
20	25	(Morocco) Mehdi Bennani	Proteam Racing	BMW 320 TC	Y	12	+36.459	18	
Ret	10	(United Kingdom) James Thompson	Lukoil Lada Sport	Lada Granta		8	Mechanical	10	
NC	15	(Netherlands) Tom Coronel	ROAL Motorsport	BMW 320 TC		7	+5 Laps	13	
Ret	8	(Russia) Mikhail Kozlovskiy	Lukoil Lada Sport	Lada Granta		2	Suspension	21	

- **Bold** denotes Fastest lap.

=== Race 2 ===
Pos.	No.	Name	Team	Car	C	Laps	Time/Retired	Grid	Points
1	72	(Argentina) José María López	Wiechers-Sport	BMW 320 TC	Y	11	20:28.525	1	25
2	3	(Italy) Gabriele Tarquini	Castrol Honda World Touring Car Team	Honda Civic WTCC		11	+3.619	7	18
3	74	(Spain) Pepe Oriola	Tuenti Racing Team	Chevrolet Cruze 1.6T		11	+3.989	6	15
4	17	(Denmark) Michel Nykjær	NIKA Racing	Chevrolet Cruze 1.6T	Y	11	+4.945	2	12
5	5	(Hungary) Norbert Michelisz	Zengő Motorsport	Honda Civic WTCC		11	+7.135	8	10
6	18	(Portugal) Tiago Monteiro	Castrol Honda World Touring Car Team	Honda Civic WTCC		11	+7.517	4	8
7	14	(United Kingdom) James Nash	bamboo-engineering	Chevrolet Cruze 1.6T	Y	11	+13.866	3	6
8	20	(France) Hugo Valente	Campos Racing	SEAT León WTCC	Y	11	+16.422	11	4
9	15	(Netherlands) Tom Coronel	ROAL Motorsport	BMW 320 TC		11	+16.767	16	2
10	26	(Italy) Stefano D'Aste	PB Racing	BMW 320 TC	Y	11	+18.320	17	1
11	9	(United Kingdom) Alex MacDowall	bamboo-engineering	Chevrolet Cruze 1.6T	Y	11	+19.073	5	
12	23	(United Kingdom) Tom Chilton	RML	Chevrolet Cruze 1.6T		11	+19.634	9	
13	12	(France) **Yvan Muller**	RML	Chevrolet Cruze 1.6T		11	+20.232	10	
14	19	(Spain) Fernando Monje	Campos Racing	SEAT León WTCC	Y	11	+23.092	15	
15	6	(Germany) Franz Engstler	Liqui Moly Team Engstler	BMW 320 TC	Y	11	+23.515	21	
16	8	(Russia) Mikhail Kozlovskiy	Lukoil Lada Sport	Lada Granta		11	+26.544	23	
17	37	(Germany) René Münnich	ALL-INKL.COM Münnich Motorsport	SEAT León WTCC	Y	11	+27.050	22	
18	55	(Hong Kong) Darryl O'Young	ROAL Motorsport	BMW 320 TC	Y	11	+36.055	19	
19	7	(Hong Kong) Charles Ng	Liqui Moly Team Engstler	BMW 320 TC	Y	11	+36.476	18	
20	10	(United Kingdom) James Thompson	Lukoil Lada Sport	Lada Granta		10	+1 Lap	12	
21	25	(Morocco) Mehdi Bennani	Proteam Racing	BMW 320 TC	Y	8	+3 Laps	20	
Ret	38	(Germany) Marc Basseng	ALL-INKL.COM Münnich Motorsport	SEAT León WTCC		7	Race incident	13	
Ret	1	(United Kingdom) Robert Huff	ALL-INKL.COM Münnich Motorsport	SEAT León WTCC		4	Race incident	14	

- **Bold** denotes Fastest lap.

== Standings after the event ==
Drivers' Championship standings

	Pos	Driver	Points
	1	(France) Yvan Muller	312
	2	(Denmark) Michel Nykjær	180
2	3	(Italy) Gabriele Tarquini	166
1	4	(United Kingdom) James Nash	146
1	5	(United Kingdom) Robert Huff	139

Yokohama Independents' Trophy standings

Pos	Driver	Points
1	(Denmark) Michel Nykjær	129
2	(United Kingdom) James Nash	120
3	(United Kingdom) Alex MacDowall	88
4	(Morocco) Mehdi Bennani	60
5	(Italy) Stefano D'Aste	58

Manufacturers' Championship standings

Pos	Manufacturer	Points
1	(Japan) Honda	661
2	(Russia) Lada	398

- Note: Only the top five positions are included for both sets of drivers' standings.
