= 2018 TCR China Touring Car Championship =

The 2018 TCR China season was the second season of the TCR's Chinese Touring Car Championship.

== Teams and drivers ==
| Team | Car | No. | Drivers | Rounds |
|---|---|---|---|---|
| (China) Freely Racing | SEAT León TCR | 2 | (China) Dai Ling Yi | 2 |
| (China) Freely Racing | SEAT León TCR | 3 | (China) Du Jia Ping | 2 |
| (China) Freely Racing | Alfa Romeo Giulietta TCR | 16 | (Hong Kong) Yiu Loong | 3 |
| (China) Freely Racing | Alfa Romeo Giulietta TCR | 98 | (China) Ma Qing Hua | 5 |
| (China) Freely Racing | Alfa Romeo Giulietta TCR | 98 | (China) Xia Yi Li | 5 |
| (China) D Garage | Kia Cee'd TCR | 5 | (Hong Kong) Edmand Chan | 1 |
| (China) D Garage | Kia Cee'd TCR | 5 | (Hong Kong) Lo Sze Ho | 1 |
| (Macau) Son Veng Racing Team | Volkswagen Golf GTi TCR | 6 | (Macau) Jerónimo Badaraco | 1 |
| (Macau) Son Veng Racing Team | Volkswagen Golf GTi TCR | 6 | (Macau) Leong Ian Veng | 1, 4 |
| (Macau) Son Veng Racing Team | Volkswagen Golf GTi TCR | 6 | (Hong Kong) Eric Lam | 3–4 |
| (Macau) Son Veng Racing Team | Volkswagen Golf GTi TCR | 6 | (Hong Kong) Anson Wong | 3 |
| (Macau) MacPro Racing | Honda Civic Type R TCR (FK8) | 8 | (Macau) Miguel Kong | 1, 3–4 |
| (Macau) MacPro Racing | Honda Civic Type R TCR (FK8) | 8 | (Macau) Kevin Lam | 1, 4 |
| (Macau) MacPro Racing | Honda Civic Type R TCR (FK8) | 8 | (Macau) Kevin Tse | 3 |
| (Macau) MacPro Racing | Honda Civic Type R TCR (FK8) | 8 | (China) Kang Jian Zhong | 2 |
| (Macau) MacPro Racing | Honda Civic Type R TCR (FK8) | 8 | (China) Tang You Xi | 2 |
| (Macau) MacPro Racing | Honda Civic Type R TCR (FK8) | 88 | (Macau) Eurico de Jesus | 1, 3–4 |
| (Macau) MacPro Racing | Honda Civic Type R TCR (FK8) | 88 | (Macau) Henry Ho | 1, 3–4 |
| (Macau) MacPro Racing | Honda Civic Type R TCR (FK8) | 88 | (Macau) André Couto | 2 |
| (Hong Kong) Teamwork Motorsport | Audi RS 3 LMS TCR | 9 | (China) Shi Nai Jie | 5 |
| (Hong Kong) Teamwork Motorsport | Audi RS 3 LMS TCR | 66 | (Hong Kong) Paul Poon | 3 |
| (Hong Kong) Teamwork Motorsport | Volkswagen Golf GTi TCR | 11 | (Hong Kong) Alex Hui | All |
| (Hong Kong) Teamwork Motorsport | Volkswagen Golf GTi TCR | 11 | (Hong Kong) Sunny Wong | All |
| (Hong Kong) TRC | Honda Civic TCR (FK2) | 17 | (Hong Kong) Terence Tse | 1 |
| (Hong Kong) TRC | Honda Civic Type R TCR (FK2) | 18 | (Hong Kong) Rolly Sham | 1 |
| (Hong Kong) TRC | Honda Civic Type R TCR (FK2) | 18 | (Hong Kong) James Tang | 1 |
| (Hong Kong) TRC | Honda Civic Type R TCR (FK2) | 26 | (Hong Kong) Pat Wong | 1 |
| (China) CUS Team | Volkswagen Golf GTi TCR | 19 | (China) Zhou Bi Huang | 2–3 |
| (China) CUS Team | Volkswagen Golf GTi TCR | 19 | (China) Zhu Zhen Yu | 2–3 |
| (China) Lufang Racing Team | Volkswagen Golf GTi TCR | 20 | (China) Li Ke Ling | 5 |
| (China) Lufang Racing Team | Volkswagen Golf GTi TCR | 20 | (China) Mai Yi Bo | 5 |
| (China) NewFaster Racing | Audi RS 3 LMS TCR | 21 | (China) Wang Hao | 1 |
| (China) NewFaster Racing | Audi RS 3 LMS TCR | 81 | (Macau) Carson Tang | 1 |
| (China) T.A Motorsport | Audi RS 3 LMS TCR | 26 | (Macau) Filipe de Souza | 3–4 |
| (China) T.A Motorsport | Audi RS 3 LMS TCR | 26 | (Macau) Ryan Wong | 4 |
| (China) Champ X T.A Motorsport | Audi RS 3 LMS TCR | 33 | (Hong Kong) Falco Lau | 5 |
| (China) Champ X T.A Motorsport | Audi RS 3 LMS TCR | 33 | (Hong Kong) Gary Lo | 5 |
| (China) Hexin Racing | Volkswagen Golf GTi TCR | 60 | (China) Chang Shuai | 4 |
| (China) Hexin Racing | Volkswagen Golf GTi TCR | 60 | (China) Chen Zhen | 4 |
| (China) Liqui Moly HE Racing | Volkswagen Golf GTi TCR | 68 | (China) Li Xue Feng | All |
| (China) Liqui Moly HE Racing | Volkswagen Golf GTi TCR | 68 | (China) Tian Li Ying | All |
| (China) LEO Racing | Volkswagen Golf GTi TCR | 77 | (China) Li Lin | 1–3, 5 |
| (China) LEO Racing | Volkswagen Golf GTi TCR | 77 | (China) Li Shi Cheng | 5 |
| (China) DRT Racing | Volkswagen Golf GTi TCR | 99 | (Malaysia) Lai Wee Sing | 1 |
| (China) DRT Racing | Volkswagen Golf GTi TCR | 99 | (China) Lv Xin Min | 1 |

== Calendar and results ==
The 2018 schedule was announced on 18 December 2017, with six events scheduled.

| Rnd. | | Circuit | Date | Pole position | Fastest lap | Winning driver | Winning team | Supporting |
|---|---|---|---|---|---|---|---|---|
| 1 | 1 | Zhuhai International Circuit | 19 May | (Hong Kong) Lo Sze Ho | (Hong Kong) Lo Sze Ho | (Macau) Henry Ho | (Macau) MacPro Racing | |
| 1 | 2 | Zhuhai International Circuit | 19 May | (China) Wang Hao | (China) Wang Hao | (Macau) Eurico de Jesus | (Macau) MacPro Racing | |
| 1 | 3 | Zhuhai International Circuit | 20 May | (Malaysia) Lai Wee Sing (China) Lv Xin Min | (Hong Kong) Alex Hui (Hong Kong) Sunny Wong | (Hong Kong) Alex Hui (Hong Kong) Sunny Wong | (Hong Kong) Teamwork Motorsport | |
| 2 | 4 | Ningbo International Circuit | 1 September | (Macau) André Couto | (Macau) André Couto | (Macau) André Couto | (Macau) MacPro Racing | |
| 2 | 5 | Ningbo International Circuit | 1 September | (Macau) André Couto | (Macau) André Couto | (Macau) André Couto | (Macau) MacPro Racing | |
| 2 | 6 | Ningbo International Circuit | 2 September | (China) Li Xue Feng (China) Tian Li Ying | (Macau) André Couto | (Hong Kong) Alex Hui (Hong Kong) Sunny Wong | (Hong Kong) Teamwork Motorsport | |
| 3 | 7 | Ningbo International Circuit | 29 September | (Hong Kong) Alex Hui | (Hong Kong) Alex Hui | (Macau) Henry Ho | (Macau) MacPro Racing | World Touring Car Cup China Touring Car Championship |
| 3 | 8 | Ningbo International Circuit | 29 September | (Hong Kong) Sunny Wong | (Hong Kong) Sunny Wong | (Macau) Eurico de Jesus | (Macau) MacPro Racing | World Touring Car Cup China Touring Car Championship |
| 3 | 9 | Ningbo International Circuit | 29 September | (Macau) Filipe de Souza | (Macau) Eurico de Jesus (Macau) Henry Ho | (Hong Kong) Alex Hui (Hong Kong) Sunny Wong | (Hong Kong) Teamwork Motorsport | World Touring Car Cup China Touring Car Championship |
| 4 | 10 | Shanghai International Circuit | 5 October | (Macau) Henry Ho | (Macau) Henry Ho | (Macau) Henry Ho | (Macau) MacPro Racing | TCR Asia Series |
| 4 | 11 | Shanghai International Circuit | 5 October | (Hong Kong) Alex Hui | (Hong Kong) Alex Hui | (Hong Kong) Alex Hui | (Hong Kong) Teamwork Motorsport | TCR Asia Series |
| 4 | 12 | Shanghai International Circuit | 5 October | (Hong Kong) Alex Hui (Hong Kong) Sunny Wong | (Hong Kong) Alex Hui (Hong Kong) Sunny Wong | (Hong Kong) Alex Hui (Hong Kong) Sunny Wong | (Hong Kong) Teamwork Motorsport | TCR Asia Series |
| 5 | 13 | Guangdong International Circuit | 30 December | (Hong Kong) Sunny Wong | (China) Ma Qing Hua | (China) Ma Qing Hua | (China) Freely Racing | |
| 5 | 14 | Guangdong International Circuit | 30 December | (Hong Kong) Alex Hui | (Hong Kong) Alex Hui | (Hong Kong) Alex Hui | (Hong Kong) Teamwork Motorsport | |
| 5 | 15 | Guangdong International Circuit | 30 December | (China) Li Ke Ling (China) Mai Yi Bo | (China) Ma Qing Hua (China) Xia Yi Li | (Hong Kong) Alex Hui (Hong Kong) Sunny Wong | (Hong Kong) Teamwork Motorsport | |

== Championship standings ==
=== Drivers' championship ===
| Pos. | Driver | ZHU | | | NIN1 | | | NIN2 | | | SHA | | | GUA | | | Pts. |
| Pos. | Driver | RD1 | RD2 | RD3 | RD1 | RD2 | RD3 | RD1 | RD2 | RD3 | RD1 | RD2 | RD3 | RD1 | RD2 | RD3 | Pts. |
|---|---|---|---|---|---|---|---|---|---|---|---|---|---|---|---|---|---|
| 1 | (Hong Kong) Alex Hui | | 2 | 1 | 4 | | 1 | **3** | | 1 | | **1** | **1** | | **1** | 1 | 157 |
| 1 | (Hong Kong) Sunny Wong | 2 | | 1 | | Ret | 1 | | **7** | 1 | Ret | | **1** | **Ret** | | 1 | 157 |
| 2 | (Macau) Henry Ho | 1 | | Ret | | | | 1 | | 6 | **1** | | 3 | | | | 127 |
| 2 | (Macau) Eurico de Jesus | | 1 | Ret | | | | | 1 | 6 | | DSQ | 3 | | | | 127 |
| 2 | (Macau) André Couto | | | | **1** | **1** | 4 | | | | | | | | | | 127 |
| 3 | (China) Li Xue Feng | 10 | | 4 | | 4 | **5** | 8 | | 4 | | 5 | 4 | | 3 | Ret | 92.5 |
| 3 | (China) Tian Li Ying | | Ret | 4 | 5 | | **5** | | 5 | 4 | 3 | | 4 | 3 | | Ret | 92.5 |
| 4 | (China) Li Lin | Ret | 3 | Ret | 3 | Ret | 6 | 7 | 2 | 5 | | | | 2 | | 2 | 82.5 |
| 4 | (China) Li Shi Cheng | | | | | | | | | | | | | | 2 | 2 | 82.5 |
| 5 | (Macau) Miguel Kong | | 4 | 3 | | | | | 4 | Ret | | 3 | 5 | | | | 76 |
| 5 | (Macau) Kevin Lam | 12 | | 3 | | | | | | | 5 | | 5 | | | | 76 |
| 5 | (China) Kang Jian Zhong | | | | | 3 | 2 | | | | | | | | | | 76 |
| 5 | (China) Tang You Xi | | | | Ret | | 2 | | | | | | | | | | 76 |
| 5 | (Macau) Kevin Tse | | | | | | | 4 | | Ret | | | | | | | 76 |
| 6 | (Macau) Filipe de Souza | | | | | | | Ret | 3 | **2** | 2 | | 2 | | | | 60 |
| 6 | (Macau) Ryan Wong | | | | | | | | | | | 2 | 2 | | | | 60 |
| 7 | (China) Zhou Bi Huang | | | | | 2 | 3 | | Ret | 3 | | | | | | | 55 |
| 7 | (China) Zhu Zhen Yu | | | | 2 | | 3 | 2 | | 3 | | | | | | | 55 |
| 8 | (China) Ma Qing Hua | | | | | | | | | | | | | 1 | | Ret | 29 |
| 8 | (China) Xia Yi Li | | | | | | | | | | | | | | 4 | Ret | 29 |
| 9 | (Macau) Jerónimo Badaraco | 8 | | DNS | | | | | | | | | | | | | 21 |
| 9 | (Macau) Leong Ian Veng | | Ret | DNS | | | | | | | 4 | | 7 | | | | 21 |
| 9 | (Hong Kong) Eric Lam | | | | | | | | | | | 6 | 7 | | | | 21 |
| 10 | (China) Li Ke Ling | | | | | | | | | | | | | 4 | | **5** | 21 |
| 10 | (China) Mai Yi Bo | | | | | | | | | | | | | | 5 | **5** | 21 |
| 11 | (China) Shi Nai Jie | | | | | | | | | | | | | 5 | 6 | 4 | 21 |
| 12 | (Malaysia) Lai Wee Sing | 4 | | **5** | | | | | | | | | | | | | 19 |
| 12 | (China) Lv Xin Min | | 7 | **5** | | | | | | | | | | | | | 19 |
| 13 | (Macau) Carson Tang | Ret | 6 | 2 | | | | | | | | | | | | | 17 |
| 14 | (China) Chang Shuai | | | | | | | | | | 6 | | 6 | | | | 14 |
| 14 | (China) Chen Zhen | | | | | | | | | | | 4 | 6 | | | | 14 |
| 16 | (Hong Kong) Eric Lam | | | | | | | 5 | | Ret | | | | | | | 12 |
| 16 | (Hong Kong) Anson Wong | | | | | | | | 6 | Ret | | | | | | | 12 |
| 17 | (Hong Kong) Terence Tse | 6 | 5 | DNS | | | | | | | | | | | | | 11 |
| 18 | (China) Wang Hao | 3 | **Ret** | DNS | | | | | | | | | | | | | 10 |
| 19 | (China) Du Jia Ping | | | | 7 | 5 | Ret | | | | | | | | | | 10 |
| 20 | (China) Dai Ling Yi | | | | 6 | 6 | Ret | | | | | | | | | | 10 |
| 21 | (Hong Kong) Pat Wong | 7 | 8 | DNS | | | | | | | | | | | | | 7 |
| 22 | (Hong Kong) Paul Poon | | | | | | | 6 | Ret | Ret | | | | | | | 7 |
| 23 | (Hong Kong) Edmand Chan | | Ret | DNS | | | | | | | | | | | | | 6 |
| 23 | (Hong Kong) Lo Sze Ho | **5** | | DNS | | | | | | | | | | | | | 6 |
| 24 | (Hong Kong) Yiu Loong | | | | | | | 9 | Ret | DNS | | | | | | | 5 |
| 25 | (Hong Kong) Rolly Sham | | Ret | DNS | | | | | | | | | | | | | 2 |
| 25 | (Hong Kong) James Tang | 9 | | DNS | | | | | | | | | | | | | 2 |
| Pos. | Driver | ZHU | | | NIN1 | | | NIN2 | | | SHA | | | GUA | | | Pts. |

| Colour | Result |
|---|---|
| Gold | Winner |
| Silver | Second place |
| Bronze | Third place |
| Green | Points classification |
| Blue | Non-points classification |
| Blue | Non-classified finish (NC) |
| Purple | Retired, not classified (Ret) |
| Red | Did not qualify (DNQ) |
| Red | Did not pre-qualify (DNPQ) |
| Black | Disqualified (DSQ) |
| White | Did not start (DNS) |
| White | Withdrew (WD) |
| White | Race cancelled (C) |
| Blank | Did not practice (DNP) |
| Blank | Did not arrive (DNA) |
| Blank | Excluded (EX) |

**Bold** – Pole

Italics – Fastest Lap
