= 2013 Guia Race of Macau =

Race details
- Round 12 of 12 in the 2013 World Touring Car Championship at Guia Circuit in Macau.
- Date: 17 November, 2013
- Location: Macau
- Course: Guia Circuit; 6.120 kilometres (3.803 mi)

Race One
- Laps: 9
Pole position
| Driver | | (France) Yvan Muller | RML |
| Time | | 2:28.933 | |
Podium
| First | | (France) Yvan Muller | RML |
| Second | | (Portugal) Tiago Monteiro | Castrol Honda Team |
| Third | | (United Kingdom) Robert Huff | Münnich Motorsport |
Fastest Lap
| Driver | | (France) Yvan Muller | RML |
| Time | | 2:31.573 | |

Race Two
- Laps: 11
Podium
| First | | (United Kingdom) Robert Huff | Münnich Motorsport |
| Second | | (Spain) Pepe Oriola | Tuenti Racing Team |
| Third | | (Netherlands) Tom Coronel | ROAL Motorsport |
Fastest Lap
| Driver | | (France) Yvan Muller | RML |
| Time | | 2:31.437 | |

The 2013 Guia Race of Macau was the final round of the 2013 World Touring Car Championship season and the ninth running of the Guia Race of Macau. The race was part of the Macau Grand Prix weekend, headlined by the Formula Three event. It was held on 17 November 2013 at the Guia Circuit in the Chinese special administrative region of Macau.

Race one was won by Yvan Muller from pole position, race two was won by Robert Huff for ALL–INKL.COM Münnich Motorsport.

James Nash won the Yokohama Independents' Trophy in race one, his first WTCC title and the first for his team bamboo-engineering.

== Background ==
With the drivers' title already secured by Yvan Muller, Gabriele Tarquini, Tom Chilton and James Nash were all in contention to finish second in the championship going to Macau. Nash was leading the Yokohama Independents' Trophy and needed just two points to secure it ahead of bamboo-engineering teammate Alex MacDowall.

When the weights were re-calculated, the Chevrolet Cruze 1.6Ts and the Honda Civic WTCCs gremained on 1,190 kg. The BMW 320 TCs gained 30 kg of weight to take them up to 1,160 kg while the SEAT León WTCCs remained below the base weight with a 10 kg increase to bring them up to 1,140 kg.

Jo Merszei joined Liqui Moly Team Engstler who along with the returning Masaki Kano brought the team's entry up to 5 cars. Yukinori Taniguchi moved teams again, this time to NIKA Racing as he looked to secure the inaugural Eurosport Asia Trophy. Fernando Monje did not race in Macau for personal reasons, Hugo Valente was joined at Campos Racing by series debutants Michael Soong and Konstantīns Calko. China Dragon Racing expanded to four cars, running a pair of Chevrolet Lacettis for Lam Kan San and Celio Alves Dias. PAS Macau Racing Team joined the championship with a Honda Accord Euro R driven by Eurico de Jesus.

== Report ==
=== Testing and free practice ===
Robert Huff set the pace in a disrupted test session on Thursday. Stefano D'Aste finished sixth despite clashing with Calko's SEAT at Moorish Hill before Taniguchi spun at the first corner and crashed into the barriers, bringing out the red flag.

Muller set the pace in free practice one, seven tenths clear of Pepe Oriola. Kin Veng Ng crashed into the barriers at Police, he was then hit by the Campos Racing car of Calko who was able to continue to the pits for repairs having been shown a black and orange flag. There was also a minor collision for Fredy Barth at Fisherman's bend.

The top two from FP1 switched places in FP2, Oriola ended the session fastest ahead of Muller. James Thompson missed the session due to steering issues on his Lada Granta while Chilton had a big crash at the Solitude Esses. Charles Ng, Franz Engstler and Michael Soong all had less serious collisions with the barriers during the remainder of the session.

=== Qualifying ===
During the first part of the session, Valente crashed into the barriers and brought the red flags out for the first time. The red flags came out again when the second Campos car of Soong crashed into the barriers and briefly caught fire. After a lengthy delay, the session resumed, and several cars tried to get quick laps in. Chilton was outside the top twelve and got up to thirteenth place before a crash for Barth brought out the red flags for the third time. The session resumed with less than five minutes left on the clock; Chilton went up to seventh on his single timed lap. This bumped out Norbert Michelisz who then responded to go second to put Oriola out in Q1. Despite having not gone out for a final run, Muller was quickest in the first session, with Huff second.

In the second session, Muller initially set the pace, although the Hondas of Tiago Monteiro and Michelisz were second and third. Tarquini in the third Honda had been close to dropping out in Q1 and now had to return to the pits when his front bumper was damaged. Muller was the only driver to set a time below 2:29; Monteiro would start second and Tarquini third. MacDowall was the leading independent driver while Tom Coronel finished tenth to take pole for race two, where he would share the front row with Thompson.

=== Warm-Up ===
Huff led the final warm-up session in the WTCC on Sunday morning, Pepe Oriola was second fastest ahead of pole sitter Muller.

=== Race One ===
Before the race started, Tarquini required an engine change in his Honda Civic and would not make the start but would start race two from the back of the grid.

Muller led away from the final rolling start of the World Touring Car Championship and distanced himself from Monteiro in second. There was contact on lap two between Muller's teammate Chilton and Oriola with Chilton spinning into one of the barriers and ending his race. Oriola went on to have a spin at the Solitude Esses which dropped him down the order having already been under investigation for the incident with Chilton. Muller claimed his second Macau win ahead of Monteiro who had spent the race defending from multiple Macau winner Huff's SEAT. Nash finished sixth to claim his first Yokohama Independent Drivers' Trophy title.

After the race, Oriola was given a 30-second time penalty for his collision with Chilton which dropped him from 8th to 15th in the final classification.

=== Race Two ===
Coronel led Thompson away from pole while behind Michelisz tagged the back of Chilton, sending the Honda spinning across the track where it was struck by a number of other cars with Mehdi Bennani, Darryl O'Young, Tom Boardman, Mikhail Kozlovskiy, Calko and Valente out on the spot. The race was red flagged while the cars were removed from the circuit, when the race resumed a battle developed behind them between Chilton and Nash for third place both in the race and in the drivers' championship. A clash between Monteiro and Muller on lap 3 pushed Muller into a tyre barrier at San Francisco and Monteiro would eventually return to the pits for repairs. On lap 4 Thompson, Chilton and Nash were all running close together in their pursuit of Coronel, Nash tapped into the back of Chilton and Huff took the opportunity to go around. Chilton dropped out of the race on lap 5 with exhaust problems, only to be hit by de Jesus as he crawled around the Maternity corner. With the Honda stopped across the track, the safety car out only for Charles Ng, Felipe De Souza and Henry Ho to crash into the back of Franz Engstler and Yvan Muller who had slowed to pass the scene of the accident. Soong and Merszei then also crashed into the stranded cars and the race was stopped for a second time. On the restart Huff quickly got past Thompson and Coronel to take the lead, Thompson then crashed out of the race following contact with Oriola. Huff went on to claim the win ahead of Oriola and Coronel, Nash in fourth was the winning independent driver.

== Results ==
=== Qualifying ===
| Pos. | No. | Name | Team | Car | C | Q1 | Q2 | Points |
|---|---|---|---|---|---|---|---|---|
| 1 | 12 | (France) Yvan Muller | RML | Chevrolet Cruze 1.6T | | 2:30.142 | 2:28.933 | **5** |
| 2 | 18 | (Portugal) Tiago Monteiro | Castrol Honda World Touring Car Team | Honda Civic WTCC | | 2:30.969 | 2:29.933 | **4** |
| 3 | 3 | (Italy) Gabriele Tarquini | Castrol Honda World Touring Car Team | Honda Civic WTCC | | 2:31.289 | 2:29.991 | **3** |
| 4 | 1 | (United Kingdom) Robert Huff | ALL-INKL.COM Münnich Motorsport | SEAT León WTCC | | 2:30.700 | 2:30.107 | **2** |
| 5 | 5 | (Hungary) Norbert Michelisz | Zengő Motorsport | Honda Civic WTCC | | 2:30.945 | 2:30.224 | **1** |
| 6 | 9 | (United Kingdom) Alex MacDowall | bamboo-engineering | Chevrolet Cruze 1.6T | **Y** | 2:31.098 | 2:30.248 | |
| 7 | 23 | (United Kingdom) Tom Chilton | RML | Chevrolet Cruze 1.6T | | 2:31.563 | 2:30.583 | |
| 8 | 14 | (United Kingdom) James Nash | bamboo-engineering | Chevrolet Cruze 1.6T | **Y** | 2:31.392 | 2:30.723 | |
| 9 | 10 | (United Kingdom) James Thompson | Lukoil Lada Sport | Lada Granta | | 2:31.173 | 2:31.189 | |
| 10 | 15 | (Netherlands) **Tom Coronel** | ROAL Motorsport | BMW 320 TC | | 2:31.488 | 2:31.287 | |
| 11 | 38 | (Germany) Marc Basseng | ALL-INKL.COM Münnich Motorsport | SEAT León WTCC | | 2:31.718 | 2:31.482 | |
| 12 | 22 | (United Kingdom) Tom Boardman | Special Tuning Racing | SEAT León WTCC | **Y** | 2:31.755 | 2:34.989 | |
| 13 | 74 | (Spain) Pepe Oriola | Tuenti Racing Team | Chevrolet Cruze 1.6T | | 2:31.800 | | |
| 14 | 25 | (Morocco) Mehdi Bennani | Proteam Racing | BMW 320 TC | **Y** | 2:32.178 | | |
| 15 | 26 | (Italy) Stefano D'Aste | PB Racing | BMW 320 TC | **Y** | 2:32.666 | | |
| 16 | 73 | (Switzerland) Fredy Barth | Wiechers-Sport | BMW 320 TC | **Y** | 2:32.961 | | |
| 17 | 55 | (Hong Kong) Darryl O'Young | ROAL Motorsport | BMW 320 TC | **Y** | 2:33.104 | | |
| 18 | 20 | (France) Hugo Valente | Campos Racing | SEAT León WTCC | **Y** | 2:33.265 | | |
| 19 | 81 | (Latvia) Konstantīns Calko | Campos Racing | SEAT León WTCC | **Y** | 2:33.847 | | |
| 20 | 8 | (Russia) Mikhail Kozlovskiy | Lukoil Lada Sport | Lada Granta | | 2:34.224 | | |
| 21 | 6 | (Germany) Franz Engstler | Liqui Moly Team Engstler | BMW 320 TC | **Y** | 2:34.667 | | |
| 22 | 7 | (Hong Kong) Charles Ng | Liqui Moly Team Engstler | BMW 320 TC | **Y** | 2:34.775 | | |
| 23 | 37 | (Germany) René Münnich | ALL-INKL.COM Münnich Motorsport | SEAT León WTCC | **Y** | 2:35.999 | | |
| 24 | 88 | (Macau) Henry Ho | Liqui Moly Team Engstler | BMW 320si | **Y** **A** | 2:37.142 | | |
| 25 | 60 | (Macau) Felipe De Souza | China Dragon Racing | Chevrolet Cruze LT | **Y** **A** | 2:37.920 | | |
| 26 | 33 | (Japan) Yukinori Taniguchi | NIKA Racing | Chevrolet Cruze 1.6T | **Y** **A** | 2:38.468 | | |
| 27 | 66 | (Macau) Jerónimo Badaraco | Son Veng Racing Team | Chevrolet Cruze LT | **Y** **A** | 2:38.866 | | |
| 28 | 80 | (Hong Kong) Michael Soong | Campos Racing | SEAT León WTCC | **Y** **A** | 2:39.897 | | |
| 29 | 70 | (Macau) Jo Merszei | Liqui Moly Team Engstler | BMW 320si | **Y** **A** | 2:40.551 | | |
107% time: 2:40.651
| – | 79 | (Macau) Eurico de Jesus | PAS Macau Racing Team | Honda Accord Euro R | **Y** **A** | 2:41.016 | | |
| – | 61 | (Macau) Kin Veng Ng | China Dragon Racing | Chevrolet Cruze LT | **Y** **A** | 2:41.491 | | |
| – | 63 | (Macau) Célio Alves Dias | China Dragon Racing | Chevrolet Lacetti | **Y** **A** | 2:42.521 | | |
| – | 77 | (Macau) Mak Ka Lok | RPM Racing | BMW 320si | **Y** **A** | 2:42.959 | | |
| – | 62 | (Macau) Lam Kam San | China Dragon Racing | Chevrolet Lacetti | **Y** **A** | 2:46.831 | | |

- **Bold** denotes Pole position for second race.

=== Race 1 ===
| Pos. | No. | Name | Team | Car | C | Laps | Time/Retired | Grid | Points |
|---|---|---|---|---|---|---|---|---|---|
| 1 | 12 | (France) **Yvan Muller** | RML | Chevrolet Cruze 1.6T | | 9 | 22:54.522 | 1 | 25 |
| 2 | 18 | (Portugal) Tiago Monteiro | Castrol Honda World Touring Car Team | Honda Civic WTCC | | 9 | +1.265 | 2 | 18 |
| 3 | 1 | (United Kingdom) Robert Huff | ALL-INKL.COM Münnich Motorsport | SEAT León WTCC | | 9 | +1.592 | 4 | 15 |
| 4 | 5 | (Hungary) Norbert Michelisz | Zengő Motorsport | Honda Civic WTCC | | 9 | +5.147 | 5 | 12 |
| 5 | 9 | (United Kingdom) Alex MacDowall | bamboo-engineering | Chevrolet Cruze 1.6T | **Y** | 9 | +7.096 | 6 | 10 |
| 6 | 14 | (United Kingdom) James Nash | bamboo-engineering | Chevrolet Cruze 1.6T | **Y** | 9 | +7.632 | 8 | 8 |
| 7 | 38 | (Germany) Marc Basseng | ALL-INKL.COM Münnich Motorsport | SEAT León WTCC | | 9 | +18.148 | 11 | 6 |
| 8 | 26 | (Italy) Stefano D'Aste | PB Racing | BMW 320 TC | **Y** | 9 | +20.644 | 15 | 4 |
| 9 | 22 | (United Kingdom) Tom Boardman | Special Tuning Racing | SEAT León WTCC | **Y** | 9 | +21.213 | 12 | 2 |
| 10 | 15 | (Netherlands) Tom Coronel | ROAL Motorsport | BMW 320 TC | | 9 | +21.806 | 10 | 1 |
| 11 | 25 | (Morocco) Mehdi Bennani | Proteam Racing | BMW 320 TC | **Y** | 9 | +22.806 | 14 | |
| 12 | 55 | (Hong Kong) Darryl O'Young | ROAL Motorsport | BMW 320 TC | **Y** | 9 | +30.471 | 16 | |
| 13 | 6 | (Germany) Franz Engstler | Liqui Moly Team Engstler | BMW 320 TC | **Y** | 9 | +32.905 | 20 | |
| 14 | 8 | (Russia) Mikhail Kozlovskiy | Lukoil Lada Sport | Lada Granta | | 9 | +40.394 | 19 | |
| 15 | 74 | (Spain) Pepe Oriola | Tuenti Racing Team | Chevrolet Cruze 1.6T | | 9 | +50.345 | 13 | |
| 16 | 37 | (Germany) René Münnich | ALL-INKL.COM Münnich Motorsport | SEAT León WTCC | **Y** | 9 | +58.083 | 21 | |
| 17 | 33 | (Japan) Yukinori Taniguchi | NIKA Racing | Chevrolet Cruze 1.6T | **Y** **A** | 9 | +1:12.888 | 23 | |
| 18 | 80 | (Hong Kong) Michael Soong | Campos Racing | SEAT León WTCC | **Y** **A** | 9 | +1:13.961 | 24 | |
| 19 | 88 | (Macau) Henry Ho | Liqui Moly Team Engstler | BMW 320si | **Y** **A** | 9 | +1:16.085 | 22 | |
| 20 | 60 | (Macau) Felipe De Souza | China Dragon Racing | Chevrolet Cruze LT | **Y** **A** | 9 | +1:18.107 | 32 | |
| 21 | 70 | (Macau) Jo Merszei | Liqui Moly Team Engstler | BMW 320si | **Y** **A** | 9 | +1:36.668 | 25 | |
| 22 | 61 | (Macau) Kin Veng Ng | China Dragon Racing | Chevrolet Cruze LT | **Y** **A** | 9 | +1:44.616 | 27 | |
| 23 | 63 | (Macau) Célio Alves Dias | China Dragon Racing | Chevrolet Lacetti | **Y** **A** | 9 | +1:45.773 | 28 | |
| 24 | 79 | (Macau) Eurico de Jesus | PAS Macau Racing Team | Honda Accord Euro R | **Y** **A** | 9 | +1:46.315 | 26 | |
| 25 | 66 | (Macau) Jerónimo Badaraco | Son Veng Racing Team | Chevrolet Cruze LT | **Y** **A** | 9 | +1:55.988 | 33 | |
| 26 | 62 | (Macau) Lam Kam San | China Dragon Racing | Chevrolet Lacetti | **Y** **A** | 9 | +2:23.146 | 30 | |
| 27 | 77 | (Macau) Mak Ka Lok | RPM Racing | BMW 320si | **Y** **A** | 9 | +2:25.450 | 29 | |
| 28 | 7 | (Hong Kong) Charles Ng | Liqui Moly Team Engstler | BMW 320 TC | **Y** | 8 | +1 Lap | 31 | |
| 29 | 81 | (Latvia) Konstantīns Calko | Campos Racing | SEAT León WTCC | **Y** | 7 | +2 Laps | 18 | |
| Ret | 20 | (France) Hugo Valente | Campos Racing | SEAT León WTCC | **Y** | 5 | Race incident | 17 | |
| Ret | 23 | (United Kingdom) Tom Chilton | RML | Chevrolet Cruze 1.6T | | 2 | Race incident | 7 | |
| Ret | 10 | (United Kingdom) James Thompson | Lukoil Lada Sport | Lada Granta | | 2 | Turbo | 9 | |
| DNS | 3 | (Italy) Gabriele Tarquini | Castrol Honda World Touring Car Team | Honda Civic WTCC | | 0 | Engine | 3 | |
| DNS | 73 | (Switzerland) Fredy Barth | Wiechers-Sport | BMW 320 TC | **Y** | 0 | Did not start | – | |

- **Bold** denotes Fastest lap.

=== Race 2 ===
| Pos. | No. | Name | Team | Car | C | Laps | Time/Retired | Grid | Points |
|---|---|---|---|---|---|---|---|---|---|
| 1 | 1 | (United Kingdom) Robert Huff | ALL-INKL.COM Münnich Motorsport | SEAT León WTCC | | 11 | 1:23:32.152 | 7 | 25 |
| 2 | 74 | (Spain) Pepe Oriola | Tuenti Racing Team | Chevrolet Cruze 1.6T | | 11 | +0.723 | 12 | 18 |
| 3 | 15 | (Netherlands) Tom Coronel | ROAL Motorsport | BMW 320 TC | | 11 | +1.173 | 1 | 15 |
| 4 | 14 | (United Kingdom) James Nash | bamboo-engineering | Chevrolet Cruze 1.6T | **Y** | 11 | +2.909 | 3 | 12 |
| 5 | 9 | (United Kingdom) Alex MacDowall | bamboo-engineering | Chevrolet Cruze 1.6T | **Y** | 11 | +3.428 | 5 | 10 |
| 6 | 12 | (France) **Yvan Muller** | RML | Chevrolet Cruze 1.6T | | 11 | +4.642 | 9 | 8 |
| 7 | 38 | (Germany) Marc Basseng | ALL-INKL.COM Münnich Motorsport | SEAT León WTCC | | 11 | +5.665 | 10 | 6 |
| 8 | 3 | (Italy) Gabriele Tarquini | Castrol Honda World Touring Car Team | Honda Civic WTCC | | 11 | +30.963 | 33 | 4 |
| 9 | 88 | (Macau) Henry Ho | Liqui Moly Team Engstler | BMW 320si | **Y** **A** | 11 | +47.079 | 22 | 2 |
| 10 | 63 | (Macau) Célio Alves Dias | China Dragon Racing | Chevrolet Lacetti | **Y** **A** | 11 | +48.255 | 30 | 1 |
| 11 | 61 | (Macau) Kin Veng Ng | China Dragon Racing | Chevrolet Cruze LT | **Y** **A** | 11 | +58.652 | 29 | |
| 12 | 62 | (Macau) Lam Kam San | China Dragon Racing | Chevrolet Lacetti | **Y** **A** | 11 | +58.921 | 32 | |
| 13 | 77 | (Macau) Mak Ka Lok | RPM Racing | BMW 320si | **Y** **A** | 11 | +1:00.680 | 31 | |
| 14 | 6 | (Germany) Franz Engstler | Liqui Moly Team Engstler | BMW 320 TC | **Y** | 11 | +1:18.982 | 19 | |
| 15 | 60 | (Macau) Felipe De Souza | China Dragon Racing | Chevrolet Cruze LT | **Y** **A** | 11 | +1:34.078 | 23 | |
| Ret | 10 | (United Kingdom) James Thompson | Lukoil Lada Sport | Lada Granta | | 7 | Race incident | 2 | |
| Ret | 33 | (Japan) Yukinori Taniguchi | NIKA Racing | Chevrolet Cruze 1.6T | **Y** **A** | 6 | Race incident | 24 | |
| Ret | 7 | (Hong Kong) Charles Ng | Liqui Moly Team Engstler | BMW 320 TC | **Y** | 5 | Race incident | 20 | |
| Ret | 80 | (Hong Kong) Michael Soong | Campos Racing | SEAT León WTCC | **Y** **A** | 5 | Race incident | 26 | |
| Ret | 70 | (Macau) Jo Merszei | Liqui Moly Team Engstler | BMW 320si | **Y** **A** | 5 | Race incident | 27 | |
| Ret | 23 | (United Kingdom) Tom Chilton | RML | Chevrolet Cruze 1.6T | | 4 | Exhaust | 4 | |
| Ret | 79 | (Macau) Eurico de Jesus | PAS Macau Racing Team | Honda Accord Euro R | **Y** **A** | 4 | Race incident | 28 | |
| Ret | 37 | (Germany) René Münnich | ALL-INKL.COM Münnich Motorsport | SEAT León WTCC | **Y** | 3 | Race incident | 21 | |
| Ret | 18 | (Portugal) Tiago Monteiro | Castrol Honda World Touring Car Team | Honda Civic WTCC | | 3 | Brakes | 8 | |
| Ret | 66 | (Macau) Jerónimo Badaraco | Son Veng Racing Team | Chevrolet Cruze LT | **Y** **A** | 2 | Technical | 25 | |
| Ret | 26 | (Italy) Stefano D'Aste | PB Racing | BMW 320 TC | **Y** | 1 | Race incident | 14 | |
| Ret | 81 | (Latvia) Konstantīns Calko | Campos Racing | SEAT León WTCC | **Y** | 0 | Race incident | 17 | |
| Ret | 55 | (Hong Kong) Darryl O'Young | ROAL Motorsport | BMW 320 TC | **Y** | 0 | Race incident | 15 | |
| Ret | 25 | (Morocco) Mehdi Bennani | Proteam Racing | BMW 320 TC | **Y** | 0 | Race incident | 13 | |
| Ret | 22 | (United Kingdom) Tom Boardman | Special Tuning Racing | SEAT León WTCC | **Y** | 0 | Race incident | 11 | |
| Ret | 20 | (France) Hugo Valente | Campos Racing | SEAT León WTCC | **Y** | 0 | Race incident | 16 | |
| Ret | 8 | (Russia) Mikhail Kozlovskiy | Lukoil Lada Sport | Lada Granta | | 0 | Race incident | 18 | |
| Ret | 5 | (Hungary) Norbert Michelisz | Zengő Motorsport | Honda Civic WTCC | | 0 | Race incident | 6 | |
| DNS | 73 | (Switzerland) Fredy Barth | Wiechers-Sport | BMW 320 TC | **Y** | 0 | Did not start | – | |

- **Bold** denotes Fastest lap.

== Standings after the event ==
Drivers' Championship standings

| | Pos | Driver | Points |
|---|---|---|---|
| | 1 | (France) Yvan Muller | 431 |
| | 2 | (Italy) Gabriele Tarquini | 242 |
| 1 | 3 | (United Kingdom) James Nash | 226 |
| 2 | 4 | (United Kingdom) Robert Huff | 215 |
| 2 | 5 | (United Kingdom) Tom Chilton | 213 |

Yokohama Independents' Trophy standings

| Pos | Driver | Points |
|---|---|---|
| 1 | (United Kingdom) James Nash | 208 |
| 2 | (United Kingdom) Alex MacDowall | 168 |
| 3 | (Denmark) Michel Nykjær | 134 |
| 4 | (Morocco) Mehdi Bennani | 102 |
| 5 | (Italy) Stefano D'Aste | 96 |

Manufacturers' Championship standings

| Pos | Manufacturer | Points |
|---|---|---|
| 1 | (Japan) Honda | 1017 |
| 2 | (Russia) Lada | 601 |

- Note: Only the top five positions are included for both sets of drivers' standings.
