= 2013 FIA WTCC Race of China =

Race details
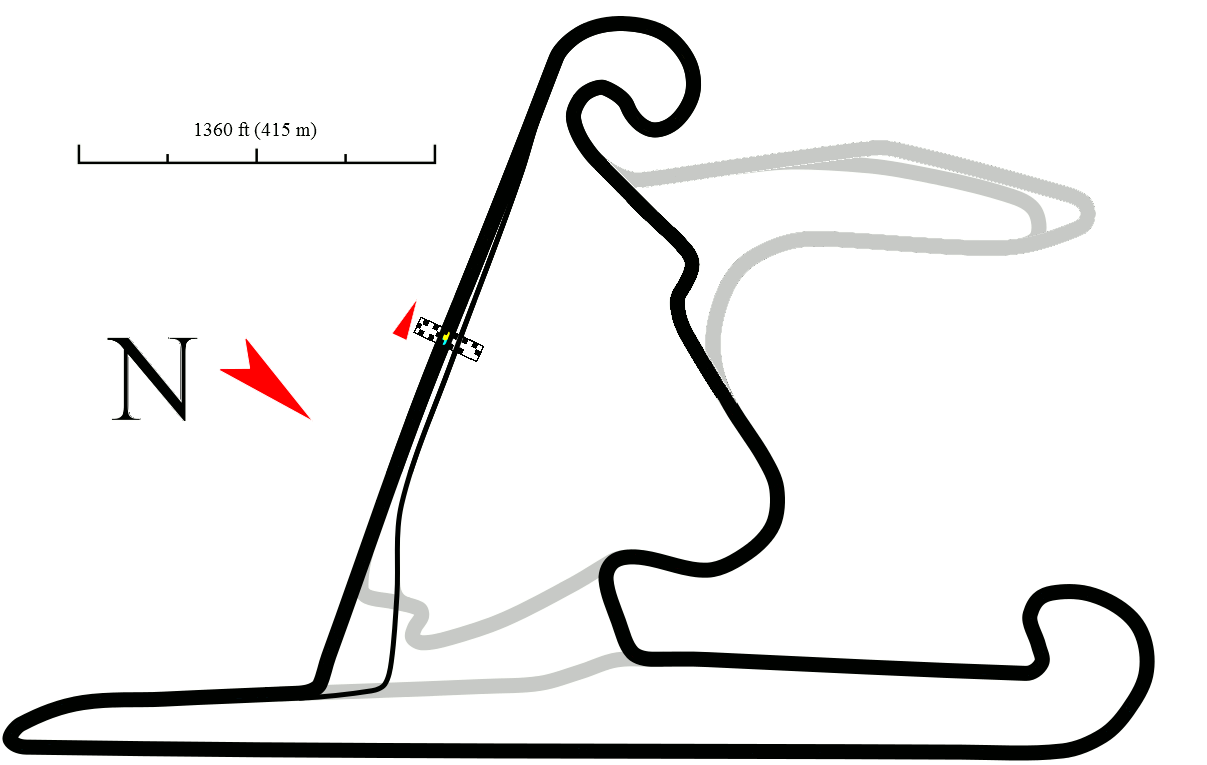
- Round 11 of 12 in the 2013 World Touring Car Championship at Shanghai International Circuit in Shanghai, China.
- Date: 3 November, 2013
- Location: Shanghai, China
- Course: Shanghai International Circuit; 4.603 kilometres (2.860 mi)

Race One
- Laps: 12
Pole position
| Driver | | (France) Yvan Muller | RML |
| Time | | 1:53.486 | |
Podium
| First | | (United Kingdom) Tom Chilton | RML |
| Second | | (France) Yvan Muller | RML |
| Third | | (United Kingdom) James Nash | bamboo-engineering |
Fastest Lap
| Driver | | (Italy) Stefano D'Aste | PB Racing |
| Time | | 2:01.528 | |

Race Two
- Laps: 10
Podium
| First | | (Portugal) Tiago Monteiro | Castrol Honda Team |
| Second | | (Italy) Gabriele Tarquini | Castrol Honda Team |
| Third | | (Hungary) Norbert Michelisz | Zengő Motorsport |
Fastest Lap
| Driver | | (Portugal) Tiago Monteiro | Castrol Honda Team |
| Time | | 1:55.568 | |

The 2013 FIA WTCC Race of China was the eleventh round of the 2013 World Touring Car Championship season and the third running of the FIA WTCC Race of China. It was held on 3 November 2013 at the Shanghai International Circuit in Shanghai, China.

Race one was won by Tom Chilton of RML and race two was won by Tiago Monteiro for the Castrol Honda World Touring Car Team.

== Background ==
Yvan Muller secured the drivers' title at the previous round in Japan. James Nash was leading the Yokohama Independents' Trophy.

When the weights were re-calculated, the Honda Civic WTCCs gained 20 kg of ballast to equal them with the Chevrolet Cruze 1.6Ts on 1,190 kg. The SEAT León WTCCs, BMW 320 TCs and Lada Granta WTCCs remained on 1,130 kg. The Volvo C30 received 20 kg of ballast to set it at 1,170 kg.

Rickard Rydell returned to the championship with NIKA Racing, replacing Hiroki Yoshimoto who had other commitments. Fredy Barth returned to Wiechers-Sport with the displaced Yukinori Taniguchi moving to Campos Racing alongside Fernando Monje and Hugo Valente. Volvo Polestar Racing entered a Volvo C30 for 2013 Scandinavian Touring Car Championship champion Thed Björk for a one–off appearance.

== Report ==
=== Testing and free practice ===
Yvan Muller set the pace in Friday's test session by almost two tenths of a second ahead of Tom Coronel, with Chilton completing the top three placings.

Thed Björk set the pace in free practice one, his first two laps of the session were both quickest. Gabriele Tarquini in second and Rickard Rydell in third were the only other drivers to break through the 1 minutes 55 seconds barrier. Pepe Oriola failed to set a timed lap due to power steering issues while Mehdi Bennani had a broken driveshaft on his Proteam Racing BMW.

Muller was ahead in free practice two with Björk a close second, Chilton was third ahead of James Thompson. Bennani suffered once again with technical problems which limited his running.

=== Qualifying ===
Muller led a Chevrolet 1–2–3–4–5–6 in qualifying, RML teammate Chilton was second with the Tuenti Racing car of Oriola third. The bamboo-engineering pair of James Nash and Alex MacDowall were next up followed by series returnee Rydell in sixth. Norbert Michelisz was the leading Honda in seventh ahead of outgoing champion Robert Huff. The Castrol Honda World Touring Car Team pairing of Gabriele Tarquini and Tiago Monteiro were ninth and tenth ensuring they would lock out the front row for race two. Franz Engstler made it through to Q2 and finished 11th fastest. Franz Engstler was one place ahead of Björk who was ineligible to score points in the nationally homologated Volvo and was therefore required to sit out Q2.

After qualifying, Björk's Volvo was found to be underweight and he was given a five–place grid penalty.

=== Warm-Up ===
Björk was quickest in Sunday morning's warm–up session, pole sitter Muller was seventh.

=== Race One ===
The track was damp after earlier rainfall and the decision was taken to start the race behind the safety car, some cars elected to run on wet tyres. The safety car went in and the race started on lap three, Oriola was the leading car on wet tyres and he passed Chilton and Muller to take the lead on the first lap. Hugo Valente went off into the gravel after being tagged and spun across in front of Engstler. Rydell moved up to fifth at the expense of MacDowall and was then able to pass Nash to move up to fourth. At the back of the field Mak Ka Lok spun on the back straight but continued without incident while up ahead the cars on wet tyres were not getting a consistent advantage. Huff had a moment on the entry of turn 1 but he was soon closing in on the Bamboo Engineering pair, he passed MacDowall on lap 5. MacDowall got 6th place back from Huff, Tarquini was now within range of Huff on lap 6. On lap 7 the advantage went back to the cars running on slick tyres, Muller and Chilton were closing the gap to Oriola, the three had built up a healthy gap to Rydell in fourth. Muller used the extra grip from his tyres to retake the lead before the end of lap 7, Chilton did so a few corners later at the start of lap 8. Nash briefly took fourth back from Rydell but the NIKA Racing driver soon retook the position, the two were at the head of a long train of cars. At the end of the back straight Nash, MacDowall and Tarquini passed Rydell at the hairpin while Huff and Michelisz were running close, they came together at the first corner on lap 9. By lap 10 Rydell had dropped out of the points while Oriola was in an increasingly distant third place. Thompson used the straightline advantage of his Lada to take 9th on Monteiro who was now under attack from the SEAT of Tom Boardman. Oriola's third place was also under threat from Nash on the final lap while Boardman tapped the back of Monteiro and went through into the final points position. Muller and Chilton were close as they headed down the back straight for the last time, the two ran side by side at the final corner with Chilton claiming victory at the line by one hundredth of a second. Nash and MacDowall moved into third and fourth on the last lap, Nash taking the Yokohama Trophy victory. In the Eurosport Asia Trophy, Taniguchi claimed victory with 21st place ahead of Felipe De Souza in one of the naturally aspirated Chevrolets.

=== Race Two ===
Monteiro retained his lead while there was a collision with Coronel and Rydell at turn one. Michelisz in third was defending from Huff with Nash and Muller close behind. On lap four yellow flags were out in the final sector for the car of Jerónimo Badaraco which had stopped near the finish line. Muller had been chasing down Nash for a couple of laps when he passed around the outside of the Bamboo Chevrolet at the first corner of lap 7, elevating Muller to 5th place. Barth and Darryl O'Young came together at the final hairpin at the end of lap 7, the incident also delayed MacDowall who had dropped down the field after a slow start. Nash lost another position to Coronel at the end of lap 8 while just up the road Muller was attacking Huff who was in turn trying to pass Michelisz for third place. Muller had a close battle with Huff on the final lap but Huff held on to take fourth while Monteiro led a Honda 1–2–3 across the line. Nash took his second independents' victory of the day and Taniguchi claimed his second Asia Trophy victory of the day.

== Results ==
=== Qualifying ===
| Pos. | No. | Name | Team | Car | C | Q1 | Q2 | Points |
|---|---|---|---|---|---|---|---|---|
| 1 | 12 | (France) Yvan Muller | RML | Chevrolet Cruze 1.6T | | 1:54.132 | 1:53.486 | **5** |
| 2 | 23 | (United Kingdom) Tom Chilton | RML | Chevrolet Cruze 1.6T | | 1:54.886 | 1:53.868 | **4** |
| 3 | 74 | (Spain) Pepe Oriola | Tuenti Racing Team | Chevrolet Cruze 1.6T | | 1:54.225 | 1:54.008 | **3** |
| 4 | 14 | (United Kingdom) James Nash | bamboo-engineering | Chevrolet Cruze 1.6T | **Y** | 1:54.777 | 1:54.034 | **2** |
| 5 | 9 | (United Kingdom) Alex MacDowall | bamboo-engineering | Chevrolet Cruze 1.6T | **Y** | 1:54.942 | 1:54.054 | **1** |
| 6 | 69 | (Sweden) Rickard Rydell | NIKA Racing | Chevrolet Cruze 1.6T | | 1:54.873 | 1:54.215 | |
| 7 | 5 | (Hungary) Norbert Michelisz | Zengő Motorsport | Honda Civic WTCC | | 1:55.081 | 1:54.576 | |
| 8 | 1 | (United Kingdom) Robert Huff | ALL-INKL.COM Münnich Motorsport | SEAT León WTCC | | 1:54.541 | 1:54.623 | |
| 9 | 3 | (Italy) Gabriele Tarquini | Castrol Honda World Touring Car Team | Honda Civic WTCC | | 1:54.637 | 1:54.666 | |
| 10 | 18 | (Portugal) **Tiago Monteiro** | Castrol Honda World Touring Car Team | Honda Civic WTCC | | 1:54.505 | 1:54.959 | |
| 11 | 6 | (Germany) Franz Engstler | Liqui Moly Team Engstler | BMW 320 TC | **Y** | 1:55.164 | 1:55.624 | |
| 12 | 15 | (Netherlands) Tom Coronel | ROAL Motorsport | BMW 320 TC | | 155.204 | | |
| 13 | 10 | (United Kingdom) James Thompson | Lukoil Lada Sport | Lada Granta | | 1:55.316 | | |
| 14 | 38 | (Germany) Marc Basseng | ALL-INKL.COM Münnich Motorsport | SEAT León WTCC | | 1:55.434 | | |
| 15 | 20 | (France) Hugo Valente | Campos Racing | SEAT León WTCC | **Y** | 1:55.535 | | |
| 16 | 7 | (Hong Kong) Charles Ng | Liqui Moly Team Engstler | BMW 320 TC | **Y** | 1:55.581 | | |
| 17^{1} | 40 | (Sweden) Thed Björk | Volvo Polestar Racing | Volvo C30 DRIVe | * | 1:54.826 | | |
| 18 | 55 | (Hong Kong) Darryl O'Young | ROAL Motorsport | BMW 320 TC | **Y** | 1:55.591 | | |
| 19 | 22 | (United Kingdom) Tom Boardman | Special Tuning Racing | SEAT León WTCC | **Y** | 1:55.610 | | |
| 20 | 73 | (Switzerland) Fredy Barth | Wiechers-Sport | BMW 320 TC | **Y** | 1:55.719 | | |
| 21 | 8 | (Russia) Mikhail Kozlovskiy | Lukoil Lada Sport | Lada Granta | | 1:55.920 | | |
| 22 | 37 | (Germany) René Münnich | ALL-INKL.COM Münnich Motorsport | SEAT León WTCC | **Y** | 1:56.171 | | |
| 23 | 19 | (Spain) Fernando Monje | Campos Racing | SEAT León WTCC | **Y** | 1:56.282 | | |
| 24 | 25 | (Morocco) Mehdi Bennani | Proteam Racing | BMW 320 TC | **Y** | 1:56.359 | | |
| 25 | 33 | (Japan) Yukinori Taniguchi | Campos Racing | SEAT León WTCC | **Y** **A** | 1:57.128 | | |
| 26 | 26 | (Italy) Stefano D'Aste | PB Racing | BMW 320 TC | **Y** | 1:58.448 | | |
| 27 | 88 | (Macau) Henry Ho | Liqui Moly Team Engstler | BMW 320si | **Y** **A** | 1:58.865 | | |
| 28 | 60 | (Macau) Felipe De Souza | China Dragon Racing | Chevrolet Cruze LT | **Y** **A** | 1:59.230 | | |
| 29 | 61 | (Macau) Kin Veng Ng | China Dragon Racing | Chevrolet Cruze LT | **Y** **A** | 2:00.337 | | |
| 30 | 77 | (Macau) Mak Ka Lok | RPM Racing | BMW 320si | **Y** **A** | 2:01.838 | | |
107% time: 2:02.141
| – | 66 | (Macau) Jerónimo Badaraco | Son Veng Racing Team | Chevrolet Cruze LT | **Y** **A** | no time set | | |

- **Bold** denotes Pole position for second race.

^1 — Björk originally qualified 12th but his car was later found to be underweight, having not been fitted with ballast to compensate for the lack of a camera on board.

=== Race 1 ===
| Pos. | No. | Name | Team | Car | C | Laps | Time/Retired | Grid | Points |
|---|---|---|---|---|---|---|---|---|---|
| 1 | 23 | (United Kingdom) Tom Chilton | RML | Chevrolet Cruze 1.6T | | 12 | 26:28.234 | 2 | 25 |
| 2 | 12 | (France) Yvan Muller | RML | Chevrolet Cruze 1.6T | | 12 | +0.010 | 1 | 18 |
| 3 | 14 | (United Kingdom) James Nash | bamboo-engineering | Chevrolet Cruze 1.6T | **Y** | 12 | +14.737 | 4 | 15 |
| 4 | 9 | (United Kingdom) Alex MacDowall | bamboo-engineering | Chevrolet Cruze 1.6T | **Y** | 12 | +15.455 | 5 | 12 |
| 5 | 74 | (Spain) Pepe Oriola | Tuenti Racing Team | Chevrolet Cruze 1.6T | | 12 | +16.441 | 3 | 10 |
| 6 | 1 | (United Kingdom) Robert Huff | ALL-INKL.COM Münnich Motorsport | SEAT León WTCC | | 12 | +16.585 | 8 | 8 |
| 7 | 3 | (Italy) Gabriele Tarquini | Castrol Honda World Touring Car Team | Honda Civic WTCC | | 12 | +16.799 | 9 | 6 |
| 8 | 10 | (United Kingdom) James Thompson | Lukoil Lada Sport | Lada Granta | | 12 | +16.825 | 13 | 4 |
| 9 | 22 | (United Kingdom) Tom Boardman | Special Tuning Racing | SEAT León WTCC | **Y** | 12 | +16.931 | 19 | 2 |
| 10 | 5 | (Hungary) Norbert Michelisz | Zengő Motorsport | Honda Civic WTCC | | 12 | +17.683 | 7 | 1 |
| 11 | 18 | (Portugal) Tiago Monteiro | Castrol Honda World Touring Car Team | Honda Civic WTCC | | 12 | +18.017 | 10 | |
| 12 | 15 | (Netherlands) Tom Coronel | ROAL Motorsport | BMW 320 TC | | 12 | +18.079 | 12 | |
| 13 | 6 | (Germany) Franz Engstler | Liqui Moly Team Engstler | BMW 320 TC | **Y** | 12 | +22.899 | 11 | |
| 14 | 69 | (Sweden) Rickard Rydell | NIKA Racing | Chevrolet Cruze 1.6T | | 12 | +27.546 | 6 | |
| 15 | 38 | (Germany) Marc Basseng | ALL-INKL.COM Münnich Motorsport | SEAT León WTCC | | 12 | +29.496 | 14 | |
| 16 | 25 | (Morocco) Mehdi Bennani | Proteam Racing | BMW 320 TC | **Y** | 12 | +42.004 | 24 | |
| 17 | 8 | (Russia) Mikhail Kozlovskiy | Lukoil Lada Sport | Lada Granta | | 12 | +45.122 | 21 | |
| 18 | 37 | (Germany) René Münnich | ALL-INKL.COM Münnich Motorsport | SEAT León WTCC | **Y** | 12 | +47.010 | 22 | |
| 19 | 73 | (Switzerland) Fredy Barth | Wiechers-Sport | BMW 320 TC | **Y** | 12 | +48.590 | 20 | |
| 20 | 55 | (Hong Kong) Darryl O'Young | ROAL Motorsport | BMW 320 TC | **Y** | 12 | +1:02.102 | 18 | |
| 21 | 33 | (Japan) Yukinori Taniguchi | Campos Racing | SEAT León WTCC | **Y** **A** | 12 | +1:03.596 | 25 | |
| 22 | 60 | (Macau) Felipe De Souza | China Dragon Racing | Chevrolet Cruze LT | **Y** **A** | 12 | +1:03.800 | 28 | |
| 23 | 88 | (Macau) Henry Ho | Liqui Moly Team Engstler | BMW 320si | **Y** **A** | 12 | +1:13.464 | 27 | |
| 24 | 66 | (Macau) Jerónimo Badaraco | Son Veng Racing Team | Chevrolet Cruze LT | **Y** **A** | 12 | +1:29.654 | 31 | |
| 25 | 77 | (Macau) Mak Ka Lok | RPM Racing | BMW 320si | **Y** **A** | 12 | +2:03.392 | 30 | |
| 26 | 61 | (Macau) Kin Veng Ng | China Dragon Racing | Chevrolet Cruze LT | **Y** **A** | 11 | +1 Lap | 29 | |
| 27 | 7 | (Hong Kong) Charles Ng | Liqui Moly Team Engstler | BMW 320 TC | **Y** | 11 | +1 Lap | 16 | |
| 28 | 26 | (Italy) **Stefano D'Aste** | PB Racing | BMW 320 TC | **Y** | 11 | +1 Lap | 26 | |
| 29 | 19 | (Spain) Fernando Monje | Campos Racing | SEAT León WTCC | **Y** | 11 | +1 Lap | 23 | |
| Ret | 20 | (France) Hugo Valente | Campos Racing | SEAT León WTCC | **Y** | 7 | Race incident | 15 | |
| DNS | 40 | (Sweden) Thed Björk | Volvo Polestar Racing | Volvo C30 DRIVe | * | 0 | Battery | 17 | |

- **Bold** denotes Fastest lap.

=== Race 2 ===
| Pos. | No. | Name | Team | Car | C | Laps | Time/Retired | Grid | Points |
|---|---|---|---|---|---|---|---|---|---|
| 1 | 18 | (Portugal) **Tiago Monteiro** | Castrol Honda World Touring Car Team | Honda Civic WTCC | | 10 | 19:26.090 | 1 | 25 |
| 2 | 3 | (Italy) Gabriele Tarquini | Castrol Honda World Touring Car Team | Honda Civic WTCC | | 10 | +1.178 | 2 | 18 |
| 3 | 5 | (Hungary) Norbert Michelisz | Zengő Motorsport | Honda Civic WTCC | | 10 | +4.143 | 4 | 15 |
| 4 | 1 | (United Kingdom) Robert Huff | ALL-INKL.COM Münnich Motorsport | SEAT León WTCC | | 10 | +5.470 | 3 | 12 |
| 5 | 12 | (France) Yvan Muller | RML | Chevrolet Cruze 1.6T | | 10 | +5.739 | 10 | 10 |
| 6 | 14 | (United Kingdom) James Nash | bamboo-engineering | Chevrolet Cruze 1.6T | **Y** | 10 | +7.423 | 7 | 8 |
| 7 | 74 | (Spain) Pepe Oriola | Tuenti Racing Team | Chevrolet Cruze 1.6T | | 10 | +7.987 | 8 | 6 |
| 8 | 15 | (Netherlands) Tom Coronel | ROAL Motorsport | BMW 320 TC | | 10 | +8.042 | 12 | 4 |
| 9 | 26 | (Italy) Stefano D'Aste | PB Racing | BMW 320 TC | **Y** | 10 | +11.407 | 26 | 2 |
| 10 | 23 | (United Kingdom) Tom Chilton | RML | Chevrolet Cruze 1.6T | | 10 | +13.608 | 9 | 1 |
| 11 | 22 | (United Kingdom) Tom Boardman | Special Tuning Racing | SEAT León WTCC | **Y** | 10 | +16.659 | 19 | |
| 12 | 20 | (France) Hugo Valente | Campos Racing | SEAT León WTCC | **Y** | 10 | +18.253 | 15 | |
| 13 | 9 | (United Kingdom) Alex MacDowall | bamboo-engineering | Chevrolet Cruze 1.6T | **Y** | 10 | +18.497 | 6 | |
| 14 | 25 | (Morocco) Mehdi Bennani | Proteam Racing | BMW 320 TC | **Y** | 10 | +19.087 | 24 | |
| 15 | 40 | (Sweden) Thed Björk | Volvo Polestar Racing | Volvo C30 DRIVe | * | 10 | +19.934 | 17 | |
| 16 | 7 | (Hong Kong) Charles Ng | Liqui Moly Team Engstler | BMW 320 TC | **Y** | 10 | +22.543 | 16 | |
| 17 | 10 | (United Kingdom) James Thompson | Lukoil Lada Sport | Lada Granta | | 10 | +25.335 | 13 | |
| 18 | 38 | (Germany) Marc Basseng | ALL-INKL.COM Münnich Motorsport | SEAT León WTCC | | 10 | +27.609 | 14 | |
| 19 | 19 | (Spain) Fernando Monje | Campos Racing | SEAT León WTCC | **Y** | 10 | +30.126 | 23 | |
| 20 | 8 | (Russia) Mikhail Kozlovskiy | Lukoil Lada Sport | Lada Granta | | 10 | +31.520 | 21 | |
| 21 | 73 | (Switzerland) Fredy Barth | Wiechers-Sport | BMW 320 TC | **Y** | 10 | +31.885 | 20 | |
| 22 | 37 | (Germany) René Münnich | ALL-INKL.COM Münnich Motorsport | SEAT León WTCC | **Y** | 10 | +33.211 | 22 | |
| 23 | 33 | (Japan) Yukinori Taniguchi | Campos Racing | SEAT León WTCC | **Y** **A** | 10 | +38.017 | 25 | |
| 24 | 60 | (Macau) Felipe De Souza | China Dragon Racing | Chevrolet Cruze LT | **Y** **A** | 10 | +53.947 | 28 | |
| 25 | 88 | (Macau) Henry Ho | Liqui Moly Team Engstler | BMW 320si | **Y** **A** | 10 | +54.519 | 27 | |
| 26 | 61 | (Macau) Kin Veng Ng | China Dragon Racing | Chevrolet Cruze LT | **Y** **A** | 10 | +1:25.975 | 29 | |
| 27 | 77 | (Macau) Mak Ka Lok | RPM Racing | BMW 320si | **Y** **A** | 10 | +1:43.366 | 30 | |
| 28 | 6 | (Germany) Franz Engstler | Liqui Moly Team Engstler | BMW 320 TC | **Y** | 8 | +2 Laps | 11 | |
| 29 | 69 | (Sweden) Rickard Rydell | NIKA Racing | Chevrolet Cruze 1.6T | | 7 | +3 Laps | 5 | |
| 30 | 55 | (Hong Kong) Darryl O'Young | ROAL Motorsport | BMW 320 TC | **Y** | 7 | +3 Laps | 18 | |
| Ret | 66 | (Macau) Jerónimo Badaraco | Son Veng Racing Team | Chevrolet Cruze LT | **Y** **A** | 1 | | 31 | |

- **Bold** denotes Fastest lap.

== Standings after the event ==
Drivers' Championship standings

| Pos | Driver | Points |
|---|---|---|
| 1 | (France) Yvan Muller | 393 |
| 2 | (Italy) Gabriele Tarquini | 235 |
| 3 | (United Kingdom) Tom Chilton | 213 |
| 4 | (United Kingdom) James Nash | 206 |
| 5 | (Denmark) Michel Nykjær | 180 |

Yokohama Independents' Trophy standings

| Pos | Driver | Points |
|---|---|---|
| 1 | (United Kingdom) James Nash | 171 |
| 2 | (Denmark) Michel Nykjær | 134 |
| 3 | (United Kingdom) Alex MacDowall | 130 |
| 4 | (Morocco) Mehdi Bennani | 94 |
| 5 | (Italy) Stefano D'Aste | 84 |

Manufacturers' Championship standings

| Pos | Manufacturer | Points |
|---|---|---|
| 1 | (Japan) Honda | 940 |
| 2 | (Russia) Lada | 581 |

- Note: Only the top five positions are included for both sets of drivers' standings.
