= Eurico de Jesus =

Macanese racing driver (born 1977)

- Nationality: Macanese
- Born: 10 June 1977 (age 49)

Macau Touring Car Championship career
- Debut season: 2010
- Current team: Macau David Racing Team
- Car number: 99
- Best finish: 1st in 2010

Previous series
- 2012-13 2008: WTCC; ATCC

Championship titles
- 2010: Macau Touring Car Championship

Eurico de Jesus (born 10 June 1977) is a Macanese racing driver currently competing in the Macau Touring Car Championship. He is a former World Touring Car Championship driver, who made his debut in 2012.

== Racing career ==
De Jesus began his career in 2008 in the CTM Macau Touring Car Race, he also raced in the Asian Touring Car Championship that season. In 2012 de Jesus made his World Touring Car Championship debut with Five Auto Racing Team driving a Honda Accord Euro R in the last round in Macau. In November 2013, it was announced that he would race in the last round in Macau, this time his car was run by PAS Macau Racing Team. He would end up being the catalyst of race 2's second red flag; losing his left rear tyre hitting the crippled car of Tom Chilton, he caused a safety car condition, but as the safety car led the field past his crash scene, several cars came barreling in causing further accidents at the same location resulting in the red flag.

== Racing record ==
=== Complete World Touring Car Championship results ===
(key) (Races in bold indicate pole position – 1 point awarded just in first race; races in italics indicate fastest lap – 1 point awarded all races; * signifies that driver led race for at least one lap – 1 point given all races)

Year	Team	Car	1	2	3	4	5	6	7	8	9	10	11	12	13	14	15	16	17	18	19	20	21	22	23	24	DC	Pts
2012	Five Auto Racing Team	Honda Accord Euro R	ITA; 1	ITA; 2	ESP; 1	ESP; 2	MAR; 1	MAR; 2	SVK; 1	SVK; 2	HUN; 1	HUN; 2	AUT; 1	AUT; 2	POR; 1	POR; 2	BRA; 1	BRA; 2	USA; 1	USA; 2	JPN; 1	JPN; 2	CHN; 1	CHN; 2	MAC; 1 Ret	MAC; 2; 18	NC	0
2013	PAS Macau Racing Team	Honda Accord Euro R	ITA; 1	ITA; 2	MAR; 1	MAR; 2	SVK; 1	SVK; 2	HUN; 1	HUN; 2	AUT; 1	AUT; 2	RUS; 1	RUS; 2	POR; 1	POR; 2	ARG; 1	ARG; 2	USA; 1	USA; 2	JPN; 1	JPN; 2	CHN; 1	CHN; 2	MAC; 1; 24	MAC; 2 Ret	NC	0
