= Mak Ka Lok =

Macau racing driver

- Nationality: (Macau) Macanese
- Born: 17 August 1965 (age 61) Hong Kong

World Touring Car Championship career
- Debut season: 2011
- Current team: RPM Racing Team
- Car number: 44
- Starts: 14
- Wins: 0
- Poles: 0
- Fastest laps: 0
- Best finish: NC in 2011-2014

Mak Ka Lok (Chinese: 麥家樂; born 17 August 1965) is a Macanese auto racing driver.

Mak has raced in Touring Car Championships within Asia and drove the final two rounds of the 2011 World Touring Car Championship in a BMW 320si In 1995, he won the Macau Cup race for the Group A 1600 class and finished second in 2008 race in the CTM class.

== Statistics ==
=== Motor racing record ===
Season	Series	Team/Car	Final Placing
2008	Asian Touring Car Championship	Honda Accord	3rd
2009	Macau Touring Car Championship	Honda Integra	7th
2009	Chinese Touring Car Championship	Peugeot 307	11th
2010	Asian Touring Car Series – S2000	Honda Integra	**3rd**
2010	Macau Touring Car Championship	Honda Integra	16th
2011	Macau Touring Car Series – S2000	Honda Integra	6th
2011	World Touring Car Championship	RPM Racing Team – BMW	NC

=== Complete World Touring Car Championship results ===
(key) (Races in bold indicate pole position) (Races in italics indicate fastest lap)

Year	Team	Car	1	2	3	4	5	6	7	8	9	10	11	12	13	14	15	16	17	18	19	20	21	22	23	24	DC	Points
2011	RPM Racing Team	BMW 320si	BRA; 1	BRA; 2	BEL; 1	BEL; 2	ITA; 1	ITA; 2	HUN; 1	HUN; 2	CZE; 1	CZE; 2	POR; 1	POR; 2	GBR; 1	GBR; 2	GER; 1	GER; 2	ESP; 1	ESP; 2	JPN; 1	JPN; 2	CHN; 1	CHN; 2	MAC; 1 Ret	MAC; 2 Ret	NC	0
2012	RPM Racing Team	BMW 320si	ITA; 1	ITA; 2	ESP; 1	ESP; 2	MAR; 1	MAR; 2	SVK; 1	SVK; 2	HUN; 1	HUN; 2	AUT; 1	AUT; 2	POR; 1	POR; 2	BRA; 1	BRA; 2	USA; 1	USA; 2	JPN; 1	JPN; 2	CHN; 1	CHN; 2	MAC; 1; 21†	MAC; 2; 16	NC	0
2013	RPM Racing	BMW 320si	ITA; 1	ITA; 2	MAR; 1	MAR; 2	SVK; 1	SVK; 2	HUN; 1	HUN; 2	AUT; 1	AUT; 2	RUS; 1	RUS; 2	POR; 1	POR; 2	ARG; 1	ARG; 2	USA; 1	USA; 2	JPN; 1; 23	JPN; 2 Ret	CHN; 1; 25	CHN; 2; 27	MAC; 1; 27	MAC; 2; 13	NC	0
2014	RPM Racing Team	BMW 320 TC	MAR; 1	MAR; 2	FRA; 1	FRA; 2	HUN; 1	HUN; 2	SVK; 1	SVK; 2	AUT; 1	AUT; 2	RUS; 1	RUS; 2	BEL; 1	BEL; 2	ARG; 1	ARG; 2	BEI; 1	BEI; 2	CHN; 1	CHN; 2	JPN; 1	JPN; 2	MAC; 1; 18	MAC; 2; 14	NC	0
2017	RC Motorsport	Lada Vesta WTCC	MAR; 1	MAR; 2	ITA; 1	ITA; 2	HUN; 1	HUN; 2	GER; 1	GER; 2	POR; 1	POR; 2	ARG; 1	ARG; 2	CHN; 1	CHN; 2	JPN; 1	JPN; 2	MAC; 1; 17	MAC; 2; 17	QAT; 1	QAT; 2					23rd	0
