= Yukinori Taniguchi =

Japanese businessman and racing driver

- Nationality: (Japan) Japanese
- Born: 27 September 1968 (age 58) Hiroshima, Japan

World Touring Car Championship career
- Debut season: 2008
- Current team: NIKA Racing
- Car number: 99
- Former teams: N. Technology, bamboo-engineering, Wiechers-Sport, Campos Racing
- Starts: 41
- Wins: 0
- Poles: 0
- Fastest laps: 0
- Best finish: 18th in 2010

Previous series
- 2012: Super GT

Yukinori Taniguchi (谷口 行規, Taniguchi Yukinori; born September 27, 1968 in Hiroshima, Hiroshima) is a Japanese businessperson and auto racing driver. He founded Yuke's, a video game developer company, in Sakai, Osaka in 1993.

== Early career ==
As a child, Taniguchi became an enthusiastic arcade gamer, spending much time on early arcade games such as Space Invaders. By the time of high school, he was programming his own game and started working under contract for a local game company in Hiroshima. Two years later, he transferred to a highschool in U.S. and graduated from it in 1989. He entered into Osaka Prefecture University as an Engineering student but at the same time, he obtained a post as the chief of Osaka development department of Compile. In 1993, when he was 24 and in his third year of university, he set up his own company, Yuke's, in his own flat in Osaka and developed about 20 games before he graduated from the university.

== Yuke's ==
=== Professional wrestling ===
In 1993, Taniguchi founded his own company, Yuke's, at his apartment in Sakai, Osaka. He developed about 20 games before graduating from the university. After graduating, he hit on the development of professional wrestling games to make use of 3D graphics performance of PlayStation thus his company's Toukon Retsuden, put on the market from Tomy in 1995. Unlike other 3D fighting games in the market which emphasised button mashing, Tokonretuden's game mechanics combined Submission-grapple-attacks like rock-paper-scissors, launching the title in Japan and selling over a million copies.

The success of the Toukon Retsuden series made Yuke's obtain capital and the company developed Evil Zone the first game to sell under the name of the Yuke's. The game did not succeed in Japan but the loss has recovered by sales in foreign countries, particularly from the USA. Because of this experience, he determined to aim at a United States market and developed WWF SmackDown!. The game that had been put on the market in 2000 not only sold 2 million in the United States but also made success also in Japan. In Japan, the game contributed to the eminence improvement of World Wrestling Entertainment (WWE) that was the base of the game.

In 2005, Taniguchi bought controlling 51% stake of slumping New Japan Pro-Wrestling (which Tokonretuden was based on) as a white knight. This action has further raised his eminence among the professional wrestling fans in Japan.

== Racing career ==
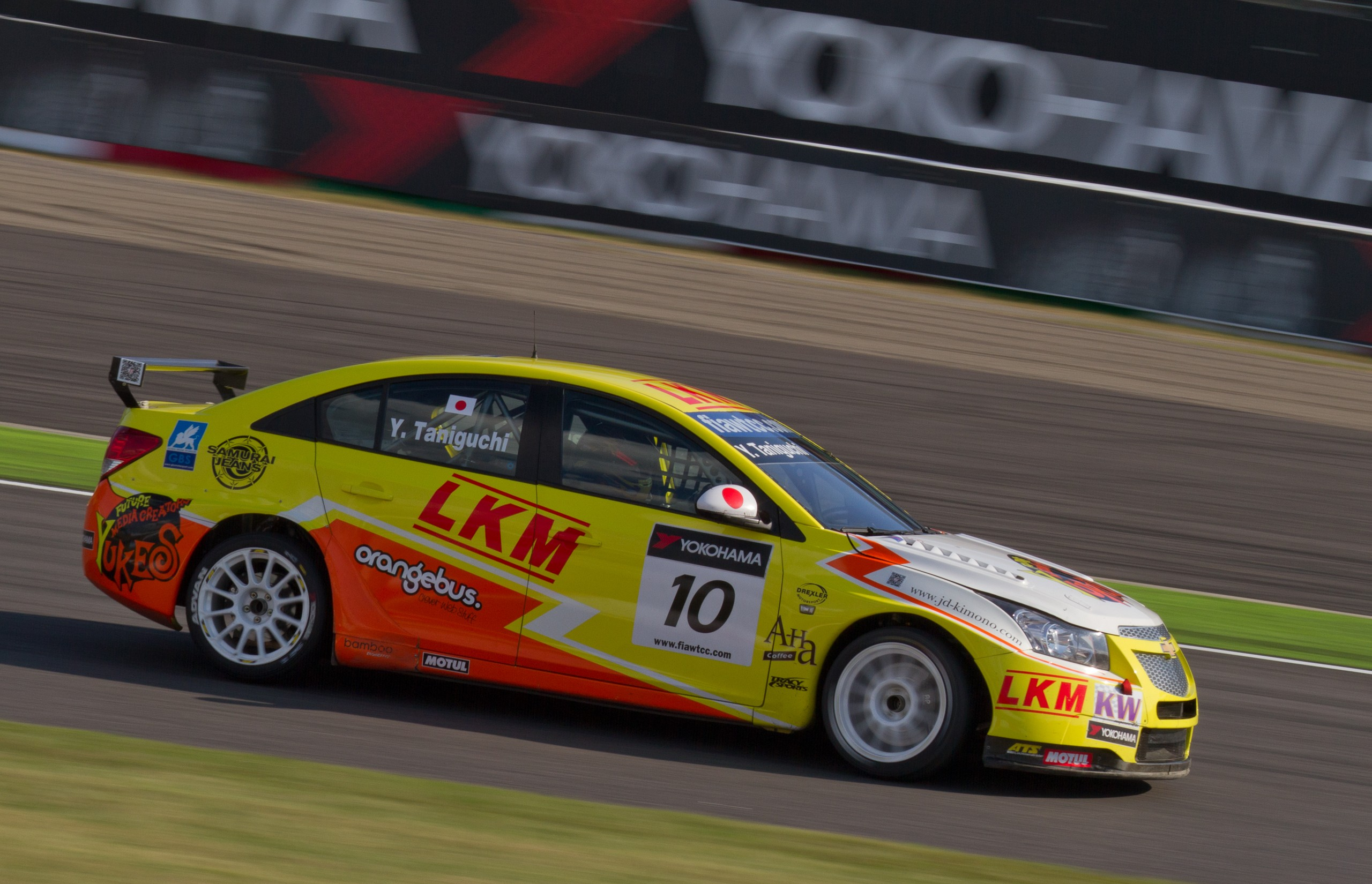
Taniguchi driving the Bamboo Engineering Chevrolet Cruze at Suzuka during the 2011 World Touring Car Championship season.

Taniguchi supported Nobushige Kumakubo's Team Orange (Team Yuke's) in the D1 Grand Prix and Yuke's developed game series of the event.

Taniguchi entered in some spec racing series as a driver. In 2005, he competed in Super Taikyu on Nissan 350Z with Tarzan Yamada and became series champion. In 2007, he competed in the Japan Le Mans Challenge, and won a race and became runner-up in the season.

In 2008 Taniguchi competed in two rounds of the FIA World Touring Car Championship (WTCC) in a Honda Accord for the N. Technology team alongside regular driver James Thompson. After a break, Taniguchi returned to the WTCC in 2010 with Bamboo Engineering, racing in the final three events of the season in a Chevrolet Lacetti, previously driven by Harry Vaulkhard. He joined Wiechers-Sport for the 2013 FIA WTCC Race of Japan to replace their regular driver Fredy Barth who had other commitments.

== Racing record ==
=== Complete World Touring Car Championship results ===
(key) (Races in bold indicate pole position) (Races in italics indicate fastest lap)

Year	Team	Car	1	2	3	4	5	6	7	8	9	10	11	12	13	14	15	16	17	18	19	20	21	22	23	24	DC	Points
2008	N.Technology	Honda Accord Euro R	BRA; 1	BRA; 2	MEX; 1	MEX; 2	ESP; 1	ESP; 2	FRA; 1	FRA; 2	CZE; 1	CZE; 2	POR; 1	POR; 2	GBR; 1	GBR; 2	GER; 1	GER; 2	EUR; 1	EUR; 2	ITA; 1; 21	ITA; 2 Ret	JPN; 1; 20	JPN; 2; 19	MAC; 1	MAC; 2	NC	0
2010	bamboo-engineering	Chevrolet Lacetti	BRA; 1	BRA; 2	MAR; 1	MAR; 2	ITA; 1	ITA; 2	BEL; 1	BEL; 2	POR; 1	POR; 2	GBR; 1	GBR; 2	CZE; 1	CZE; 2	GER; 1; 17	GER; 2; 14	ESP; 1; 17	ESP; 2; 18	JPN; 1; 9	JPN; 2; 16	MAC; 1; 13	MAC; 2 Ret			18th	4
2011	bamboo-engineering	Chevrolet Lacetti	BRA; 1; 18	BRA; 2; 15																							20th	6
2011	bamboo-engineering	Chevrolet Cruze 1.6T			BEL; 1; 14	BEL; 2 DSQ	ITA; 1; 13	ITA; 2; 11	HUN; 1; 11	HUN; 2; 11	CZE; 1; 15	CZE; 2; 14	POR; 1; 15	POR; 2; 15	GBR; 1; 16	GBR; 2; 13	GER; 1; 17	GER; 2; 14	ESP; 1; 14	ESP; 2; 16	JPN; 1; 7	JPN; 2; 14	CHN; 1; 20	CHN; 2 DNS	MAC; 1 WD	MAC; 2 WD	20th	6
2013	Wiechers-Sport	BMW 320 TC	ITA; 1	ITA; 2	MAR; 1	MAR; 2	SVK; 1	SVK; 2	HUN; 1	HUN; 2	AUT; 1	AUT; 2	RUS; 1	RUS; 2	POR; 1	POR; 2	ARG; 1	ARG; 2	USA; 1	USA; 2	JPN; 1; 17	JPN; 2; 16					NC	0
2013	Campos Racing	SEAT León WTCC																					CHN; 1; 21	CHN; 2; 23			NC	0
2013	NIKA Racing	Chevrolet Cruze 1.6T																							MAC; 1; 17	MAC; 2 Ret	NC	0
2014	NIKA Racing	Honda Civic WTCC	MAR; 1	MAR; 2	FRA; 1	FRA; 2	HUN; 1; 17	HUN; 2; 17	SVK; 1	SVK; 2	AUT; 1	AUT; 2	RUS; 1	RUS; 2	BEL; 1	BEL; 2	ARG; 1	ARG; 2	BEI; 1	BEI; 2	CHN; 1	CHN; 2	JPN; 1	JPN; 2	MAC; 1	MAC; 2	NC	0

^{*} Season still in progress.

=== Complete Super GT results ===
Year	Team	Car	Class	1	2	3	4	5	6	7	8	DC	Points
2012	Hitotsuyama Racing	Audi R8 LMS	GT300	OKA	FUJ; 15	SEP	SUG	SUZ	FUJ	AUT	MOT	NC	0
