= Hugo Valente =

French racing driver (born 1992)

Hugo Mario Valente
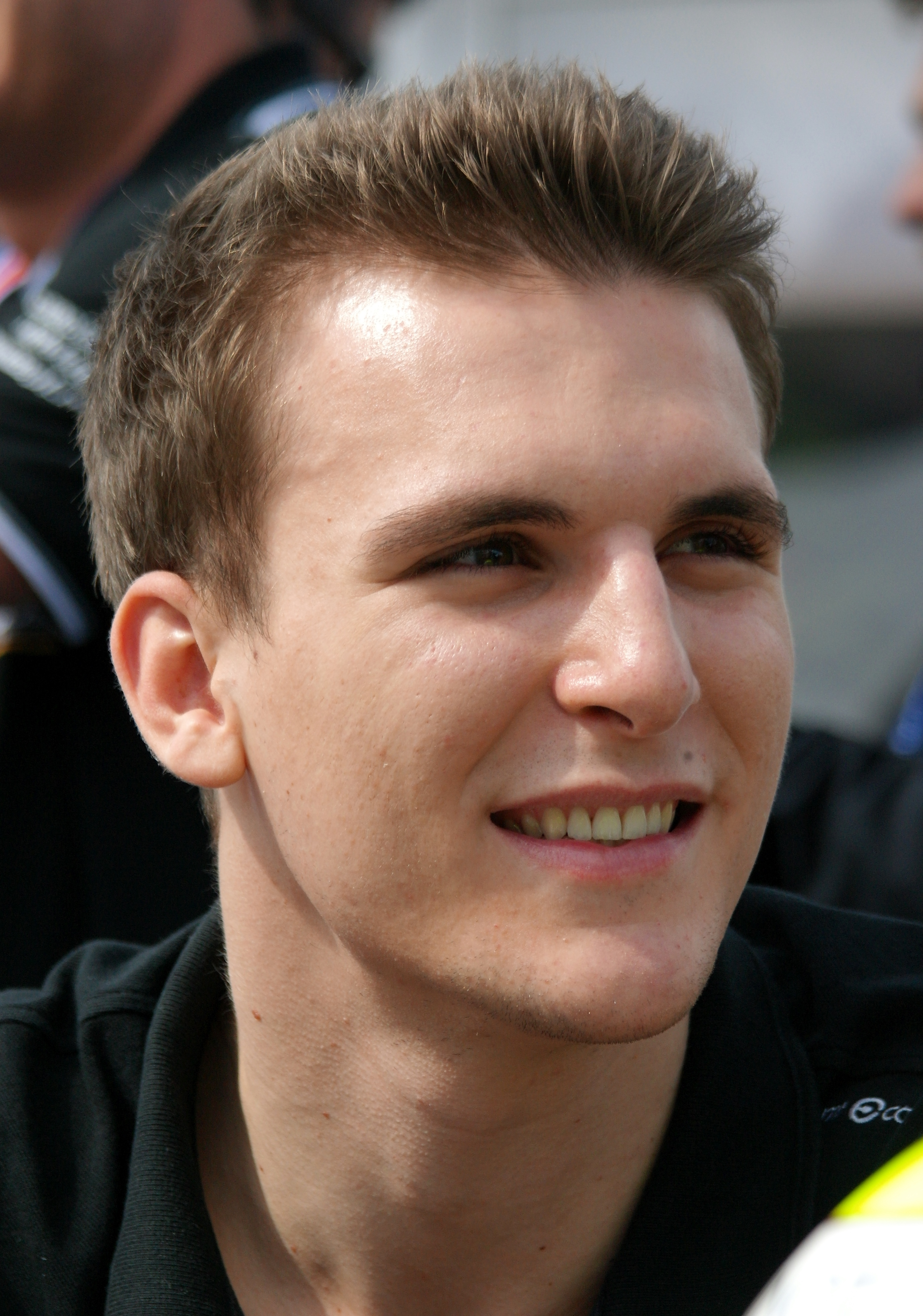
- Valente in 2016 at the Circuit de Magny-Cours
- Nationality: (France) French
- Born: June 17, 1992 (age 34) Choisy-le-Roi, France

World Touring Car Championship career
- Debut season: 2012
- Categorisation: FIA Silver
- Former teams: SUNRED Engineering, Campos Racing, Lada Sport Rosneft
- Starts: 82
- Wins: 0
- Poles: 0
- Fastest laps: 2
- Best finish: 9th in 2015

Previous series
- 2015, 2017 2012 2010 2009–2010 2009 2008: TCR International Series; French SEAT León Supercopa; Formula Renault 2.0 UK; Eurocup Formula Renault 2.0; Formula Renault 2.0 WEC; Formul'Academy Euro Series

Hugo Mario Valente (born 17 June 1992) is a French former auto racing driver. He raced in the World Touring Car Championship for SUNRED Engineering, Campos Racing and the Lada factory team having made his debut in the series at the 2012 FIA WTCC Race of China. For 2017, he made the switch to the TCR International Series, where part way through the season he announced his retirement from motorsport. He was born in Choisy-le-Roi and is of Italian descent.

== Racing career ==
=== Formula Renault Eurocup ===
For 2009, Valente moved into car racing and into the Eurocup Formula Renault 2.0 series with SG Formula. He finished the season 24th in the standings with a best result of eighth at the Nürburgring. He stayed in the series for 2010, moving to the new Tech 1 Racing team alongside Arthur Pic and Aaro Vainio. He scored a single podium finish, of second place, on the first weekend at Motorland Aragón and he went on to finish the season 12th on 28 points.

=== French SEAT León Supercopa ===
After taking a sabbatical in 2011, Valente returned to racing for 2012 in the French SEAT León Supercopa. He led the championship going into the final round at the Circuit Paul Ricard but ultimately lost out to Jimmy Antunes in the final race.

=== World Touring Car Championship ===
==== SUNRED Engineering (2012) ====
Valente made his debut in the WTCC at the 2012 FIA WTCC Race of China, driving the SUNRED SR León 1.6T previously driven in the 2012 season by Tiago Monteiro and Hiroki Yoshimoto. He qualified 23rd for the race with the only SR León on the grid. His car was found to be over-boosting later on in Q1 but his best time was set prior to the change being made so his grid slot was unaffected. His best result of the weekend was fifteenth in race one, but he was later dropped to sixteenth in the classification when he was one of five drivers issued with a 30-second penalty for cutting a chicane to avoid a separate incident.

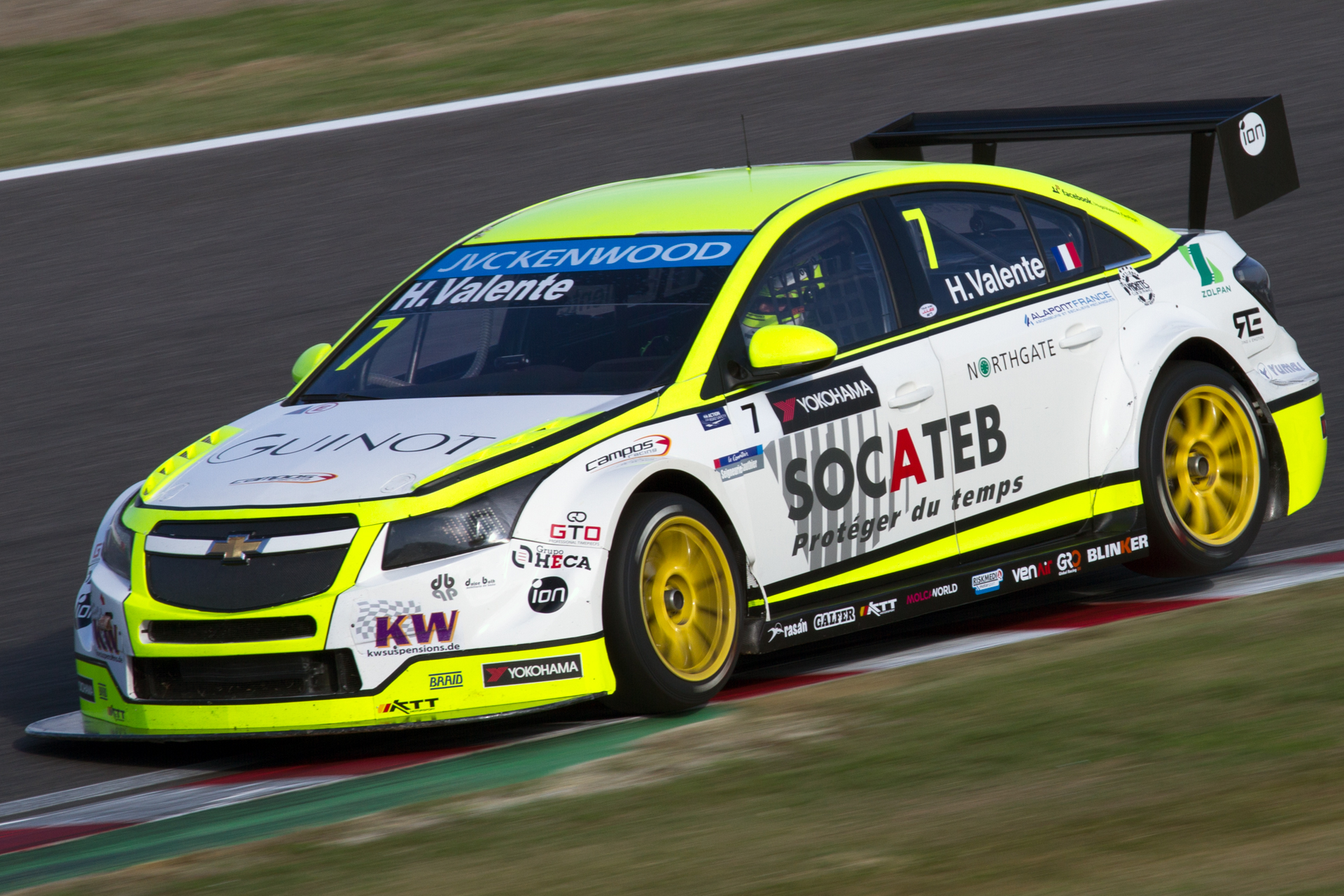
Valente competing in the 2014 World Touring Car Championship

==== Campos Racing (2013–2015) ====
Valente would stay the WTCC full-time in 2013 season, joining Campos Racing alongside Fernando Monje in a SEAT León WTCC. The start of his season was delayed until the Race of Hungary when Campos introduced their second car. He skipped the Russian and Portuguese rounds of the championship and his car was taken over by European Touring Car Cup driver Nikolay Karamyshev.

==== Lada Sport (2016) ====
Valtente secured a factory drive with the Lada Sport Rosneft team for 2016. It was a tough season as Valente was unable to make the podium, unlike his teammates Gabriele Tarquini and Nick Catsburg who both took victories. Valente's best results were two fourth place finishes in Morocco and Russia. After scoring points consistently for the first half of the season, Valente would only finish once more in the points across the final four rounds including five retirements. This left him in 12th place overall, three places behind Tarquini and five behind Catsburg. At the end of the season it was announced that Lada would be pulling out of the World Touring Car Championship, leaving Valente without a drive for 2017.

=== TCR International Series ===
==== Campos Racing (2015) ====
Valente made his debut in the new for 2015, TCR International Series, at the penultimate round in Thailand. Driving with Campos Racing in their Opel Astra, Valente did not finish the first race of the weekend, although he was still classified. Valente started the second race from pole position as a result of it being a reversed grid race. However, Valente would retire from this race as well.

==== Craft-Bamboo Racing (2017) ====
Having been unable to secure a seat in the World Touring Car Championship, Valente rejoined the TCR International Series with the Craft-Bamboo Racing team alongside TCR frontrunners and former World Touring Car rivals, Pepe Oriola and James Nash. At the first round in Georgia, Valente retired from the first race of the season, but finished in ninth place in the second and scoring his first TCR points. Valente took his first podium of the season in the second round at Bahrain, with a second place finish. He followed this up with a third place in the second race of the weekend. However a non-points scoring weekend at Spa-Francorchamps dealt a blow to his championship hopes. Although Valente finished sixth in the first race at Monza, a further retirement in the second, having started the race from pole left Valente in tenth place in the championship, 67 points adrift from the championship leader at that point in time.

Shortly before the round at the Salzburgring, it was announced that Valente would retire from motorsport with immediate effect, citing the need to be closer to his family, in particular his young daughter. His seat at the team was taken over by former British Touring Car driver, Dan Lloyd.

== Racing record ==
=== Complete Eurocup Formula Renault 2.0 results ===
(key) (Races in bold indicate pole position; races in italics indicate fastest lap)

Year	Entrant	1	2	3	4	5	6	7	8	9	10	11	12	13	14	15	16	DC	Points
2009	SG Formula	CAT; 1 Ret	CAT; 2; 10	SPA; 1; 28	SPA; 2; 21	HUN; 1; 10	HUN; 2; 12	SIL; 1; 13	SIL; 2; 18	LMS; 1; 23	LMS; 2; 17	NÜR; 1; 8	NÜR; 2 Ret	ALC; 1 Ret	ALC; 2; 19			24th	5
2010	Tech 1 Racing	ALC; 1; 8	ALC; 2; 2	SPA; 1; 14	SPA; 2; 15	BRN; 1; 12	BRN; 2; 14	MAG; 1; 8	MAG; 2 Ret	HUN; 1; 16	HUN; 2 Ret	HOC; 1 Ret	HOC; 2; 8	SIL; 1; 9	SIL; 2 DNS	CAT; 1 Ret	CAT; 2 Ret	12th	28

=== Complete World Touring Car Championship results ===
(key) (Races in bold indicate pole position) (Races in italics indicate fastest lap)

Year	Team	Car	1	2	3	4	5	6	7	8	9	10	11	12	13	14	15	16	17	18	19	20	21	22	23	24	DC	Points
2012	SUNRED Engineering	SUNRED SR León 1.6T	ITA; 1	ITA; 2	ESP; 1	ESP; 2	MAR; 1	MAR; 2	SVK; 1	SVK; 2	HUN; 1	HUN; 2	AUT; 1	AUT; 2	POR; 1	POR; 2	BRA; 1	BRA; 2	USA; 1	USA; 2	JPN; 1	JPN; 2	CHN; 1; 16	CHN; 2; 18	MAC; 1	MAC; 2	NC	0
2013	Campos Racing	SEAT León WTCC	ITA; 1	ITA; 2	MAR; 1	MAR; 2	SVK; 1	SVK; 2	HUN; 1; 12	HUN; 2; 19	AUT; 1 Ret	AUT; 2 DNS	RUS; 1	RUS; 2	POR; 1; 18	POR; 2; 14	ARG; 1; 13	ARG; 2; 8	USA; 1; 13	USA; 2; 14	JPN; 1	JPN; 2	CHN; 1 Ret	CHN; 2; 12	MAC; 1 Ret	MAC; 2 Ret	21st	4
2014	Campos Racing	Chevrolet RML Cruze TC1	MAR; 1; 8	MAR; 2; 3	FRA; 1; 6	FRA; 2; 10	HUN; 1; 10	**HUN**; **2**; 3	SVK; 1; 11	SVK; 2 C	AUT; 1 NC	AUT; 2 Ret	RUS; 1 Ret	**RUS**; **2**; 9	BEL; 1; 12	BEL; 2; 9	ARG; 1 Ret	ARG; 2 Ret	BEI; 1; 12	BEI; 2; 11	CHN; 1; 9	CHN; 2; 8	JPN; 1; 5	JPN; 2 Ret	MAC; 1 NC	**MAC**; **2**; 3	12th	85
2015	Campos Racing	Chevrolet RML Cruze TC1	ARG; 1 Ret	ARG; 2 DNS	MAR; 1; 15	MAR; 2; 9	HUN; 1; 3	HUN; 2; 8	GER; 1 Ret	GER; 2 DNS	RUS; 1; 12	RUS; 2; 8	SVK; 1; 5	SVK; 2; 5	FRA; 1 Ret	FRA; 2; 6	POR; 1 Ret	POR; 2; 7	JPN; 1; 10	**JPN**; **2**; 2	CHN; 1; 8	**CHN**; **2** Ret	THA; 1 Ret	THA; 2 DNS	QAT; 1; 3	QAT; 2; 6	9th	120
2016	Lada Sport Rosneft	Lada Vesta WTCC	**FRA**; **1**; 5	FRA; 2; 7	**SVK**; **1**; 12	SVK; 2 Ret	HUN; 1; 6	HUN; 2; 9	MAR; 1 Ret	MAR; 2; 4	GER; 1; 6	GER; 2; 10	RUS; 1; 4	RUS; 2; 7	POR; 1 Ret	POR; 2; 9	ARG; 1 Ret	ARG; 2 Ret	JPN; 1 Ret	JPN; 2; 13	CHN; 1; 6	CHN; 2; 12	QAT; 1 Ret	QAT; 2 Ret			12th	78

=== Complete TCR International Series results ===
(key) (Races in bold indicate pole position) (Races in italics indicate fastest lap)

Year	Team	Car	1	2	3	4	5	6	7	8	9	10	11	12	13	14	15	16	17	18	19	20	21	22	DC	Points
2015	Campos Racing	Opel Astra OPC	SEP; 1	SEP; 2	SHA; 1	SHA; 2	VAL; 1	VAL; 2	ALG; 1	ALG; 2	MNZ; 1	MNZ; 2	SAL; 1	SAL; 2	SOC; 1	SOC; 2	RBR; 1	RBR; 2	MRN; 1	MRN; 2	CHA; 1; 21†	CHA; 2 Ret	MAC; 1	MAC; 2	NC	0
2017	Lukoil Craft-Bamboo Racing	SEAT León TCR	RIM; 1 Ret	RIM; 2; 9	BHR; 1; 2	BHR; 2; 3	SPA; 1; 15	SPA; 2 Ret	MNZ; 1; 6	MNZ; 2 Ret	SAL; 1	SAL; 2	HUN; 1	HUN; 2	OSC; 1	OSC; 2	CHA; 1	CHA; 2	ZHE; 1	ZHE; 2	DUB; 1	DUB; 2			16th	46

^{†} Driver did not finish the race, but was classified as he completed over 90% of the race distance.
