= Leong Ian Veng =

Macanese racing driver

- Nationality: Macanese
- Born: 22 February 1981 (age 45) Portuguese Macau

Previous series
- 2012 2008-13: World Touring Car Championship; Macau Touring Car Championship

Championship titles
- 2013: Macau Touring Car Championship

"Kelvin" Leong Ian Veng (born 12 September 1968) also known as Kelvin Leong is a Macanese racing driver previously competing in the Macau Touring Car Championship and the World Touring Car Championship, where he made his debut in 2012.

== Racing career ==
Leong began his career in 2008 in the Macau Touring Car Championship, he raced in the championship for up until 2013, winning the championship that year. In 2012, Leong made his World Touring Car Championship debut with Son Veng Racing Team driving a Honda Accord Euro R in the Chinese round of the championship.

== Racing record ==
=== Complete World Touring Car Championship results ===
(key) (Races in bold indicate pole position – 1 point awarded just in first race; races in italics indicate fastest lap – 1 point awarded all races; * signifies that driver led race for at least one lap – 1 point given all races)

Year	Team	Car	1	2	3	4	5	6	7	8	9	10	11	12	13	14	15	16	17	18	19	20	21	22	23	24	DC	Pts
2012	Son Veng Racing Team	Honda Accord Euro R	ITA; 1	ITA; 2	ESP; 1	ESP; 2	MAR; 1	MAR; 2	SVK; 1	SVK; 2	HUN; 1	HUN; 2	AUT; 1	AUT; 2	POR; 1	POR; 2	BRA; 1	BRA; 2	USA; 1	USA; 2	JPN; 1	JPN; 2	CHN; 1; 17	CHN; 2 Ret	MAC; 1	MAC; 2	NC	0

=== Complete Macau Touring Car Series results ===
==== Macau GT Challenge ====
(key) (Races in bold indicate pole position) (Races in italics indicate fastest lap)

Year	Team	1	2	3	4	Pos	Points
2023	Son Veng Racing Team	GIC1; 1	GIC1; 2; 3	GIC2; 1	GIC2; 2	9th	15

==== Greater Bay Area GT Cup ====
(key) (Races in bold indicate pole position) (Races in italics indicate fastest lap)

Year	Team	1	2	3	4	Pos	Points
2024	Son Veng Racing Team	ZZIC1; 1; 4	ZZIC1; 2; 5	ZZIC2; 1	ZZIC2; 2	9th	18
