= 2013 FIA WTCC Race of Japan =

Race details
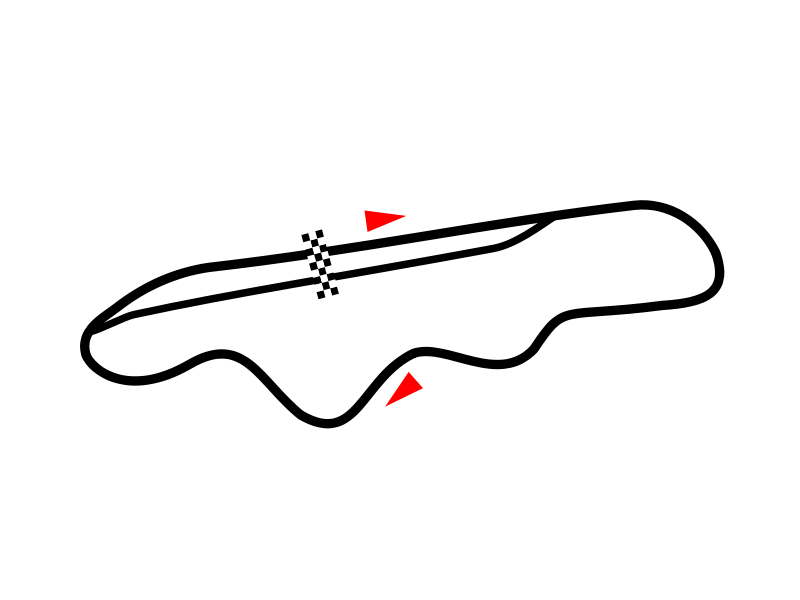
- Round 10 of 12 in the 2013 World Touring Car Championship at Suzuka Circuit (East Circuit) in Suzuka City, Japan.
- Date: 22 September, 2013
- Location: Suzuka City, Japan
- Course: Suzuka Circuit (East Circuit); 2.243 kilometres (1.394 mi)

Race One
- Laps: 26
Pole position
| Driver | | (Hungary) Norbert Michelisz | Zengő Motorsport |
| Time | | 52.886 | |
Podium
| First | | (Hungary) Norbert Michelisz | Zengő Motorsport |
| Second | | (United Kingdom) Alex MacDowall | bamboo-engineering |
| Third | | (France) Yvan Muller | RML |
Fastest Lap
| Driver | | (Hungary) Norbert Michelisz | Zengő Motorsport |
| Time | | 53.887 | |

Race Two
- Laps: 26
Podium
| First | | (Netherlands) Tom Coronel | ROAL Motorsport |
| Second | | (Morocco) Mehdi Bennani | Proteam Racing |
| Third | | (Portugal) Tiago Monteiro | Castrol Honda Team |
Fastest Lap
| Driver | | (Morocco) Mehdi Bennani | Proteam Racing |
| Time | | 54.602 | |

The 2013 FIA WTCC Race of Japan (formally the 2013 FIA WTCC JVC Kenwood Race of Japan) was the tenth round of the 2013 World Touring Car Championship season and the sixth running of the FIA WTCC Race of Japan. It was held on 22 September 2013 at the Suzuka Circuit in Suzuka City, Japan.

Race one was won by Norbert Michelisz of Zengő Motorsport and race two was won by Tom Coronel of ROAL Motorsport.

Yvan Muller secured his fourth World Touring Car Championship Drivers' Championship title by finishing third in race one, he became the first driver to win the title without the support of a manufacturer.

Race two was the 200th World Touring Car Championship race to be run since the series began in 2005.

== Background ==
Muller was leading the drivers' championship, he had his second opportunity to secure a fourth world title during the weekend. Michel Nykjær and James Nash were jointly leading the Yokohama Independents' Trophy.

Before the start of the season the new Eurosport Asia Trophy was launched for drivers entered on a race–by–race basis for the three Asian rounds at the end of the season, starting in Japan. Points would be awarded to the top eight finishers in class with additional points for any World Championship points scored.

The Chevrolet Cruze 1.6Ts continue to be the benchmark cars, retaining their 40 kg maximum ballast to set them at 1,190 kg. The Honda Civic WTCCs gained 10 kg after their strong showing in the United States to take them up to 1,170 kg. The Honda of Takuya Izawa was set at the base weight of 1,150 kg on its first appearance of the season, this was the test car previous used by Tiago Monteiro in 2012 which was homologated under 2012 Scandinavian Touring Car Championship regulations. Both the SEAT León WTCCs and BMW 320 TCs dropped to the minimum weight of 1,130 kg, the same as the Lada Granta WTCCs. The Chevrolet Cruze LTs and the BMW 320sis making their first appearances of the season started on the base weight of 1,150 kg.

The Castrol Honda World Touring Car Team added a third car for local driver Takuya Izawa. Franz Engstler was unable to take part in the event due to illness, his replacement was local racer Masaki Kano. This ended Engstler's run of 138 consecutive race entries. Liqui Moly Team Engstler entered a naturally aspirated BMW 320si for Macanese driver Henry Ho. In the week leading up to the race, Yokohama Trophy joint leader Michel Nykjær lost his drive at NIKA Racing due to financial issues, his replacement was Hiroki Yoshimoto. Campos Racing reduced their entry to a single car for Fernando Monje with Hugo Valente not participating. China Dragon Racing joined the grid with a pair of Chevrolet Cruze LTs for Felipe De Souza and Kin Veng Ng, the Son Veng Racing Team ran another naturally aspirated Cruze for series debutant Jerónimo Badaraco. Wiechers-Sport ran Yukinori Taniguchi as the replacement for Fredy Barth who was unable to participate due to other commitments. RPM Racing entered a BMW 320si for Mak Ka Lok.

== Report ==
=== Testing and free practice ===
Muller led Pepe Oriola at the end of the first test session on Friday which saw a number of red flags. Souza spun his China Dragon Racing Chevrolet at turn eight, Mikhail Kozlovskiy was the next to get stuck in the gravel while Norbert Michelisz put his Zengő Motorsport Honda also ended his session in the gravel traps.

Monteiro headed a Honda 1–2 in free practice one with Izawa second fastest, championship leader Muller was third. Marc Basseng was black flagged having been towed out of the gravel trap at Turn 8.

Muller was on top in free practice two, Alex MacDowall was second having led the session earlier on. Tom Chilton had a near–miss with his RML teammate and had to go off the track onto the grass to avoid collecting Muller.

=== Qualifying ===
The four Honda cars led by Gabriele Tarquini were the first out on track at the start of Q1. Chilton was fastest earlier on in the session with MacDowall third. Monteiro went to the top of the times 8 minutes in before he was deposed by the fellow Honda of Michelisz. Muller moved to the top of the times with 3 minutes remaining, James Thompson moved into the top 12 at the expense of Charles Ng. Izawa was outside the top 12 and made a last attempt to get through to the second part of qualifying but a trip out onto the grass meant he failed to improve his time, ensuring Robert Huff in 12th was safely through to the next session.

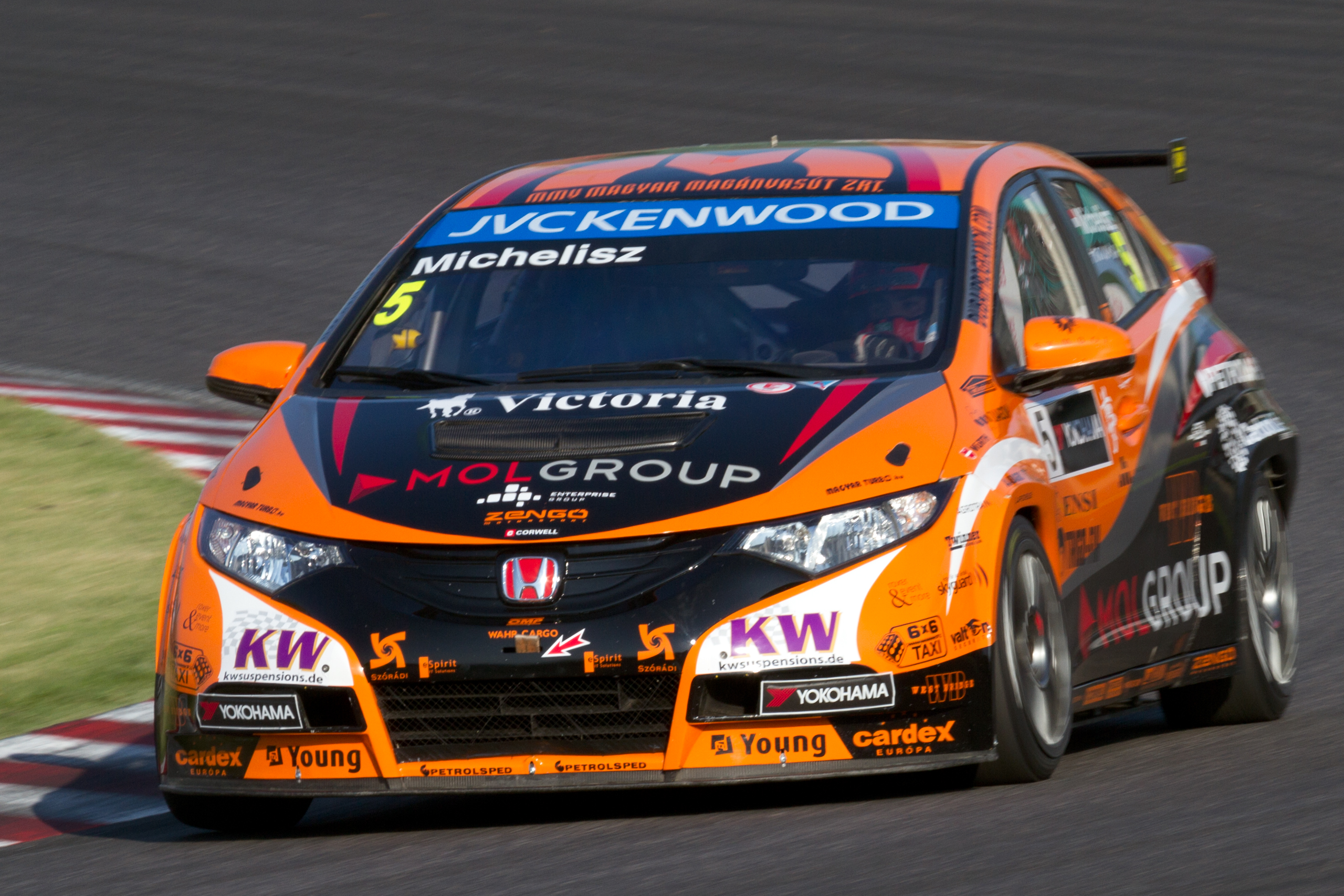
Poleman Norbert Michelisz during qualifying

Early on in Q2, Michelisz led the RML drivers in the times while Thompson opted not to go out straight away. At the halfway point of the session all the drivers were in the pit lane, Oriola and MacDowall went out before Thompson went out for the first time with just under four minutes left of the session. Oriola looked to be setting a quick lap but failed to improve in the last sector, MacDowall went up to second with Thompson on his first timed lap did not improve from 12th. Muller had a slide at turn one while Tarquini went off a Turn 3 and narrowly avoided the tyre wall. At the end of the session Michelisz stayed on top to secure his first pole position of the season, MacDowall in second was the best placed independent driver while Mehdi Bennani finished tenth to take pole for race two.

=== Warm-Up ===
Michelisz was fastest in the warm–up session on Sunday morning with Monteiro second.

=== Race One ===
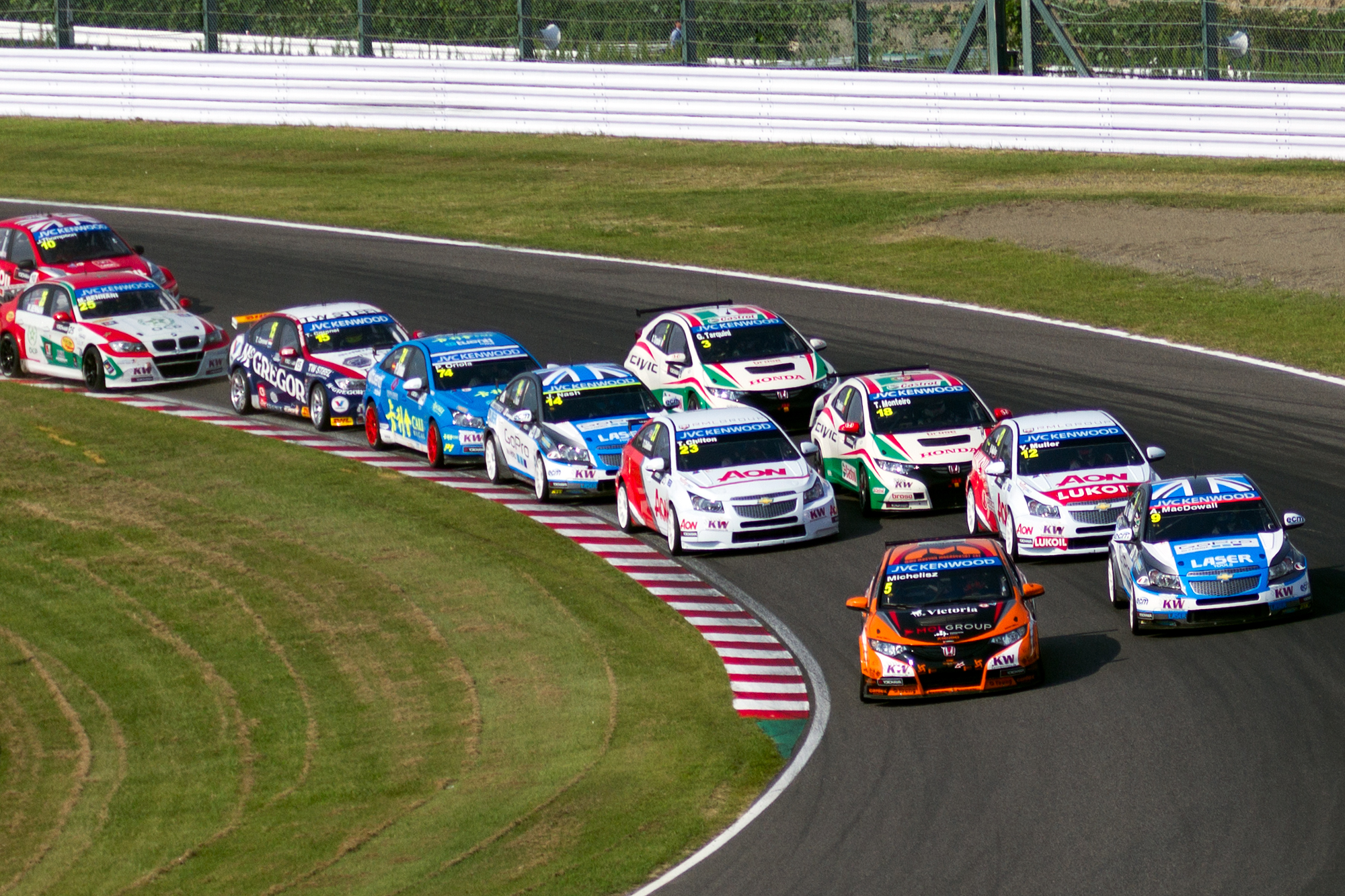
Start of Race One

Michelisz got away from pole position well to keep MacDowall behind him while Monteiro leapt up to third. At the end of the first lap Monteiro attempted to pass MacDowall but ran wide and dropped back behind the RML cars. On lap 4 Pepe Oriola tapped the back of Tarquini, as the Honda driver tried to regain control Nash went up the inside and moved up ahead of Oriola. Lap 8 saw Yoshimoto run wide at Turn 1. At half distance, Michelisz had built up a healthy lead over MacDowall who had the close company of Muller and Chilton; there was a gap to the rest of the field behind them led by Tarquini. Monteiro was right behind Oriola on lap 19 and trying to take seventh place, he tapped the back of Oriola who recovered but then Monteiro tried to go up the inside of Oriola at Turn 7, crashing into the tyre stack on the apex. At the same time Tarquini went off the track with a left–front puncture which released Nash into fifth place. Monteiro went into the pits for repairs as Oriola was issued with a drive–through penalty for squeezing Monteiro off the track. Oriola failed to serve his penalty; he returned to the pits where he retired his car. Michelisz claimed the victory while MacDowall held on to second after defending from Muller and Chilton on the last lap. Muller secured his fourth World Drivers' Championship title with third place.

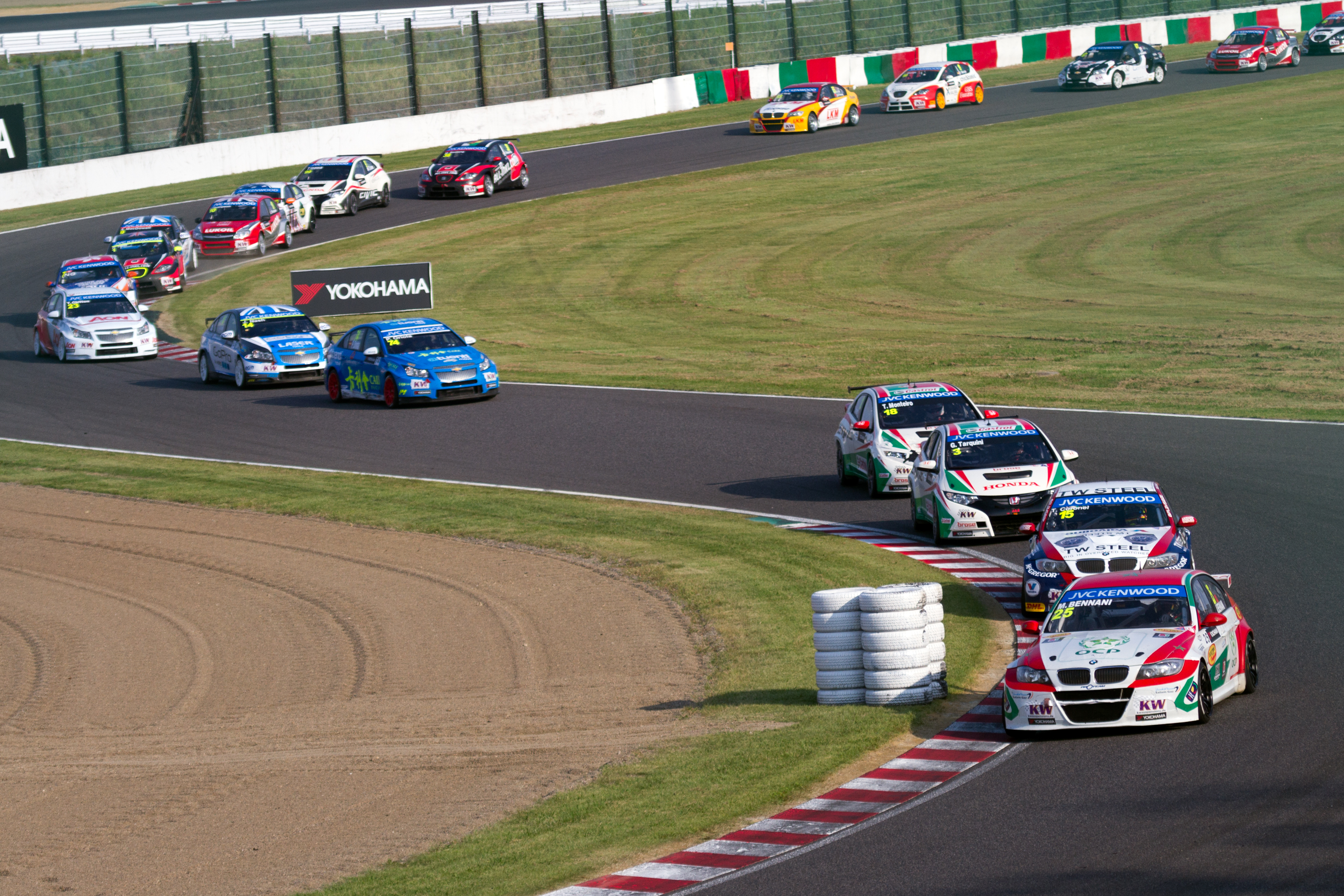
Opening lap of Race Two

=== Race Two ===
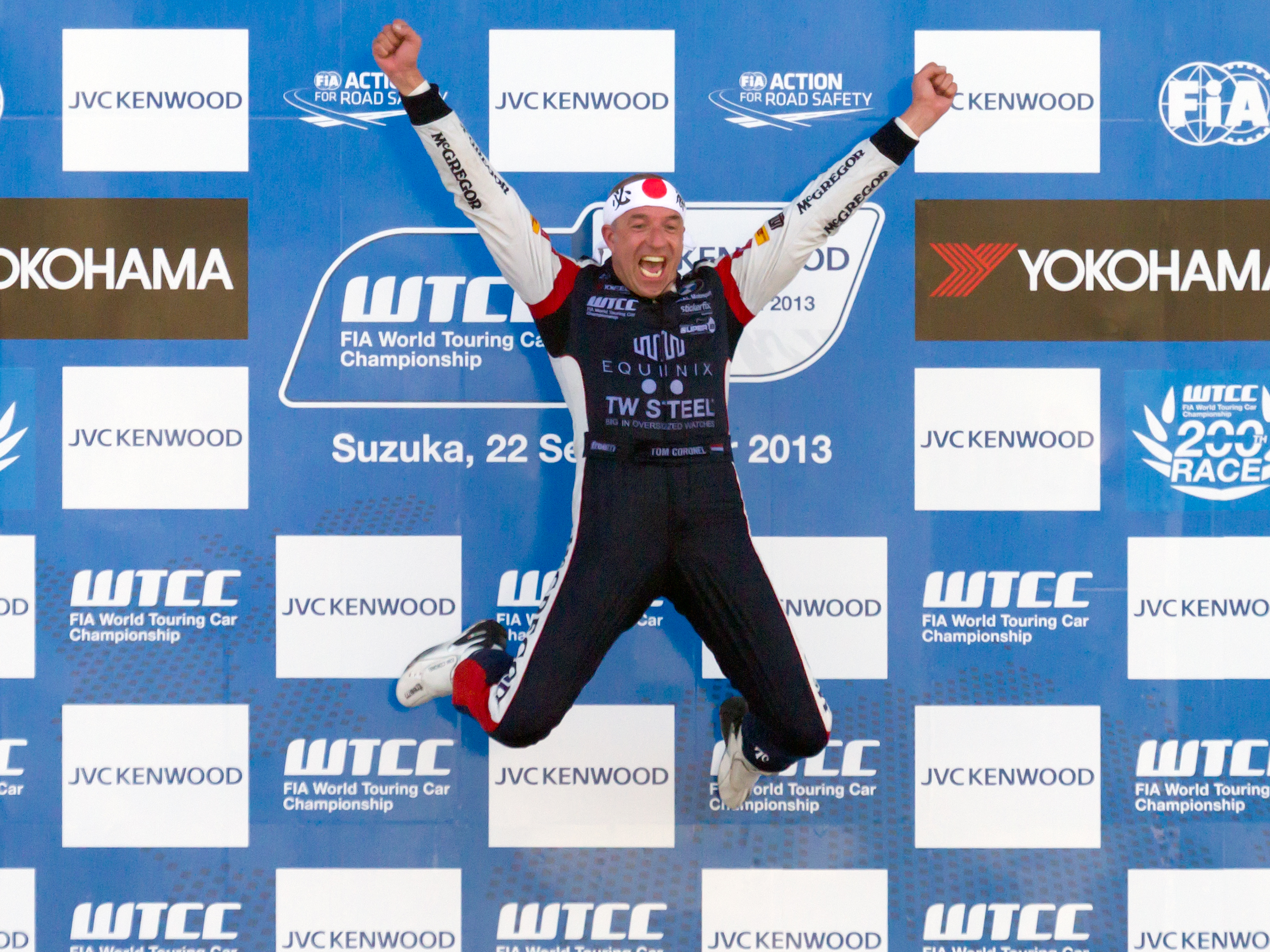
Tom Coronel celebrating his victory in Race Two

Bennani lined up on pole position for the 200th race in the history of the WTCC. Bennani held the lead while contact further back between Michelisz and Muller flung Muller off into the wall and out of the race, Michelisz suffered a broken front left suspension. The incident left polystyrene on the pit straight. With the yellow flags out in the first sector, overtaking opportunities were limited as the leading pair of Bennani and Coronel pulled away from the Hondas of Tarquini and Monteiro. Tom Boardman tried an overtake up the inside of Kozlovskiy at Turn 1, Kozlovskiy was tapped and ran wide and Boardman went through. Coronel also tried a move on Bennani at the first corner shortly after and then again on lap 10 with no success. Mak went off into the gravel in the second sector while Monteiro got past his teammate. On lap 13 Kozlovskiy and Oriola were issued with drive–through penalties for jump starts. Charles Ng was defending from Robert Huff who made a move on the pit straight and went onto the grass to complete the move into the first corner. On lap 17 Coronel went into the lead, passing Bennani at the first corner when the Proteam Racing driver ran out wider than usual. Two laps from the end, MacDowall went off at Turn 1 and dropped from 9th to 13th when he returned to the track. Coronel claimed his third victory in Japan, Bennani was second and the independent winner.

After the race, Basseng was given a 30–second penalty for a move on Thompson, which dropped him out of the points to 12th.

== Results ==
=== Qualifying ===
| Pos. | No. | Name | Team | Car | C | Q1 | Q2 | Points |
|---|---|---|---|---|---|---|---|---|
| 1 | 5 | (Hungary) Norbert Michelisz | Zengő Motorsport | Honda Civic WTCC | | 53.341 | 52.886 | **5** |
| 2 | 9 | (United Kingdom) Alex MacDowall | bamboo-engineering | Chevrolet Cruze 1.6T | **Y** | 53.696 | 53.011 | **4** |
| 3 | 23 | (United Kingdom) Tom Chilton | RML | Chevrolet Cruze 1.6T | | 53.417 | 53.101 | **3** |
| 4 | 12 | (France) Yvan Muller | RML | Chevrolet Cruze 1.6T | | 53.228 | 53.119 | **2** |
| 5 | 14 | (United Kingdom) James Nash | bamboo-engineering | Chevrolet Cruze 1.6T | **Y** | 53.405 | 53.125 | **1** |
| 6 | 18 | (Portugal) Tiago Monteiro | Castrol Honda World Touring Car Team | Honda Civic WTCC | | 53.430 | 53.365 | |
| 7 | 74 | (Spain) Pepe Oriola | Tuenti Racing Team | Chevrolet Cruze 1.6T | | 53.449 | 53.365 | |
| 8 | 3 | (Italy) Gabriele Tarquini | Castrol Honda World Touring Car Team | Honda Civic WTCC | | 53.382 | 53.379 | |
| 9 | 15 | (Netherlands) Tom Coronel | ROAL Motorsport | BMW 320 TC | | 53,405 | 53.432 | |
| 10 | 25 | (Morocco) **Mehdi Bennani** | Proteam Racing | BMW 320 TC | **Y** | 53.604 | 53.466 | |
| 11 | 1 | (United Kingdom) Robert Huff | ALL-INKL.COM Münnich Motorsport | SEAT León WTCC | | 53.711 | 53.535 | |
| 12 | 10 | (United Kingdom) James Thompson | Lukoil Lada Sport | Lada Granta | | 53.685 | 53.648 | |
| 13 | 7 | (Hong Kong) Charles Ng | Liqui Moly Team Engstler | BMW 320 TC | **Y** | 53.733 | | |
| 14 | 38 | (Germany) Marc Basseng | ALL-INKL.COM Münnich Motorsport | SEAT León WTCC | | 53.812 | | |
| 15 | 99 | (Japan) Takuya Izawa | Honda Racing Team JAS | Honda Civic WTCC | **A** | 53.827 | | |
| 16 | 19 | (Spain) Fernando Monje | Campos Racing | SEAT León WTCC | **Y** | 53.870 | | |
| 17 | 67 | (Japan) Hiroki Yoshimoto | NIKA Racing | Chevrolet Cruze 1.6T | **Y** **A** | 53.986 | | |
| 18 | 26 | (Italy) Stefano D'Aste | PB Racing | BMW 320 TC | **Y** | 53.991 | | |
| 19 | 55 | (Hong Kong) Darryl O'Young | ROAL Motorsport | BMW 320 TC | **Y** | 54.027 | | |
| 20 | 37 | (Germany) René Münnich | ALL-INKL.COM Münnich Motorsport | SEAT León WTCC | **Y** | 54.158 | | |
| 21 | 68 | (Japan) Masaki Kano | Liqui Moly Team Engstler | BMW 320 TC | **Y** **A** | 54.263 | | |
| 22 | 8 | (Russia) Mikhail Kozlovskiy | Lukoil Lada Sport | Lada Granta | | 54.292 | | |
| 23 | 22 | (United Kingdom) Tom Boardman | Special Tuning Racing | SEAT León WTCC | **Y** | 54.395 | | |
| 24 | 33 | (Japan) Yukinori Taniguchi | Wiechers-Sport | BMW 320 TC | **Y** **A** | 54.471 | | |
| 25 | 66 | (Macau) Jerónimo Badaraco | Son Veng Racing Team | Chevrolet Cruze LT | **Y** **A** | 55.257 | | |
| 26 | 88 | (Macau) Henry Ho | Liqui Moly Team Engstler | BMW 320si | **Y** **A** | 55.611 | | |
| 27 | 60 | (Macau) Felipe De Souza | China Dragon Racing | Chevrolet Cruze LT | **Y** **A** | 55.672 | | |
| 28 | 61 | (Macau) Kin Veng Ng | China Dragon Racing | Chevrolet Cruze LT | **Y** **A** | 56.103 | | |
| 29 | 77 | (Macau) Mak Ka Lok | RPM Racing | BMW 320si | **Y** **A** | 56.478 | | |

- **Bold** denotes Pole position for second race.

=== Race 1 ===
| Pos. | No. | Name | Team | Car | C | Laps | Time/Retired | Grid | Points |
|---|---|---|---|---|---|---|---|---|---|
| 1 | 5 | (Hungary) **Norbert Michelisz** | Zengő Motorsport | Honda Civic WTCC | | 26 | 23:58.613 | 1 | 25 |
| 2 | 9 | (United Kingdom) Alex MacDowall | bamboo-engineering | Chevrolet Cruze 1.6T | **Y** | 26 | +4.832 | 2 | 18 |
| 3 | 12 | (France) Yvan Muller | RML | Chevrolet Cruze 1.6T | | 26 | +5.149 | 4 | 15 |
| 4 | 23 | (United Kingdom) Tom Chilton | RML | Chevrolet Cruze 1.6T | | 26 | +5.422 | 3 | 12 |
| 5 | 14 | (United Kingdom) James Nash | bamboo-engineering | Chevrolet Cruze 1.6T | **Y** | 26 | +14.377 | 5 | 10 |
| 6 | 10 | (United Kingdom) James Thompson | Lukoil Lada Sport | Lada Granta | | 26 | +25.611 | 12 | 8 |
| 7 | 1 | (United Kingdom) Robert Huff | ALL-INKL.COM Münnich Motorsport | SEAT León WTCC | | 26 | +25.786 | 11 | 6 |
| 8 | 15 | (Netherlands) Tom Coronel | ROAL Motorsport | BMW 320 TC | | 26 | +25.940 | 9 | 4 |
| 9 | 38 | (Germany) Marc Basseng | ALL-INKL.COM Münnich Motorsport | SEAT León WTCC | | 26 | +26.247 | 14 | 2 |
| 10 | 19 | (Spain) Fernando Monje | Campos Racing | SEAT León WTCC | **Y** | 26 | +26.534 | 16 | 1 |
| 11 | 25 | (Morocco) Mehdi Bennani | Proteam Racing | BMW 320 TC | **Y** | 26 | +26.747 | 10 | |
| 12 | 99 | (Japan) Takuya Izawa | Honda Racing Team JAS | Honda Civic WTCC | **A** | 26 | +27.062 | 15 | |
| 13 | 55 | (Hong Kong) Darryl O'Young | ROAL Motorsport | BMW 320 TC | **Y** | 26 | +28.805 | 19 | |
| 14 | 7 | (Hong Kong) Charles Ng | Liqui Moly Team Engstler | BMW 320 TC | **Y** | 26 | +34.138 | 13 | |
| 15 | 8 | (Russia) Mikhail Kozlovskiy | Lukoil Lada Sport | Lada Granta | | 26 | +36.211 | 22 | |
| 16 | 37 | (Germany) René Münnich | ALL-INKL.COM Münnich Motorsport | SEAT León WTCC | **Y** | 26 | +36.280 | 20 | |
| 17 | 33 | (Japan) Yukinori Taniguchi | Wiechers-Sport | BMW 320 TC | **Y** **A** | 26 | +36.985 | 24 | |
| 18 | 67 | (Japan) Hiroki Yoshimoto | NIKA Racing | Chevrolet Cruze 1.6T | **Y** **A** | 26 | +44.883 | 17 | |
| 19 | 68 | (Japan) Masaki Kano | Liqui Moly Team Engstler | BMW 320 TC | **Y** **A** | 26 | +48.667 | 21 | |
| 20 | 66 | (Macau) Jerónimo Badaraco | Son Veng Racing Team | Chevrolet Cruze LT | **Y** **A** | 26 | +52.433 | 25 | |
| 21 | 60 | (Macau) Felipe De Souza | China Dragon Racing | Chevrolet Cruze LT | **Y** **A** | 25 | +1 Lap | 27 | |
| 22 | 61 | (Macau) Kin Veng Ng | China Dragon Racing | Chevrolet Cruze LT | **Y** **A** | 25 | +1 Lap | 28 | |
| 23 | 77 | (Macau) Mak Ka Lok | RPM Racing | BMW 320si | **Y** **A** | 25 | +1 Lap | 29 | |
| 24 | 88 | (Macau) Henry Ho | Liqui Moly Team Engstler | BMW 320si | **Y** **A** | 24 | +2 Laps | 26 | |
| 25 | 22 | (United Kingdom) Tom Boardman | Special Tuning Racing | SEAT León WTCC | **Y** | 21 | +5 Laps | 23 | |
| 26 | 74 | (Spain) Pepe Oriola | Tuenti Racing Team | Chevrolet Cruze 1.6T | | 21 | +5 Laps^{1} | 7 | |
| 27 | 3 | (Italy) Gabriele Tarquini | Castrol Honda World Touring Car Team | Honda Civic WTCC | | 21 | +5 Laps | 8 | |
| 28 | 18 | (Portugal) Tiago Monteiro | Castrol Honda World Touring Car Team | Honda Civic WTCC | | 19 | +7 Laps | 6 | |
| 29 | 26 | (Italy) Stefano D'Aste | PB Racing | BMW 320 TC | **Y** | 19 | +7 Laps | 18 | |

- **Bold** denotes Fastest lap.

^1 — Oriola received a post-race 30-second penalty.

=== Race 2 ===
| Pos. | No. | Name | Team | Car | C | Laps | Time/Retired | Grid | Points |
|---|---|---|---|---|---|---|---|---|---|
| 1 | 15 | (Netherlands) Tom Coronel | ROAL Motorsport | BMW 320 TC | | 26 | 23:56.929 | 2 | 25 |
| 2 | 25 | (Morocco) **Mehdi Bennani** | Proteam Racing | BMW 320 TC | **Y** | 26 | +2.259 | 1 | 18 |
| 3 | 18 | (Portugal) Tiago Monteiro | Castrol Honda World Touring Car Team | Honda Civic WTCC | | 26 | +9.935 | 5 | 15 |
| 4 | 3 | (Italy) Gabriele Tarquini | Castrol Honda World Touring Car Team | Honda Civic WTCC | | 26 | +10.732 | 3 | 12 |
| 5 | 14 | (United Kingdom) James Nash | bamboo-engineering | Chevrolet Cruze 1.6T | **Y** | 26 | +11.438 | 6 | 10 |
| 6 | 23 | (United Kingdom) Tom Chilton | RML | Chevrolet Cruze 1.6T | | 26 | +11.802 | 8 | 8 |
| 7 | 7 | (Hong Kong) Charles Ng | Liqui Moly Team Engstler | BMW 320 TC | **Y** | 26 | +13.762 | 13 | 6 |
| 8 | 1 | (United Kingdom) Robert Huff | ALL-INKL.COM Münnich Motorsport | SEAT León WTCC | | 26 | +14.088 | 11 | 4 |
| 9 | 26 | (Italy) Stefano D'Aste | PB Racing | BMW 320 TC | **Y** | 26 | +23.564 | 18 | 2 |
| 10 | 55 | (Hong Kong) Darryl O'Young | ROAL Motorsport | BMW 320 TC | **Y** | 26 | +23.753 | 19 | 1 |
| 11 | 10 | (United Kingdom) James Thompson | Lukoil Lada Sport | Lada Granta | | 26 | +23.780 | 12 | |
| 12 | 9 | (United Kingdom) Alex MacDowall | bamboo-engineering | Chevrolet Cruze 1.6T | **Y** | 26 | +24.249 | 9 | |
| 13 | 19 | (Spain) Fernando Monje | Campos Racing | SEAT León WTCC | **Y** | 26 | +24.497 | 16 | |
| 14 | 37 | (Germany) René Münnich | ALL-INKL.COM Münnich Motorsport | SEAT León WTCC | **Y** | 26 | +24.739 | 20 | |
| 15 | 68 | (Japan) Masaki Kano | Liqui Moly Team Engstler | BMW 320 TC | **Y** **A** | 26 | +26.576 | 21 | |
| 16 | 33 | (Japan) Yukinori Taniguchi | Wiechers-Sport | BMW 320 TC | **Y** **A** | 26 | +36.768 | 24 | |
| 17 | 38 | (Germany) Marc Basseng | ALL-INKL.COM Münnich Motorsport | SEAT León WTCC | | 26 | +53.300 | 14 | |
| 18 | 66 | (Macau) Jerónimo Badaraco | Son Veng Racing Team | Chevrolet Cruze LT | **Y** **A** | 26 | +54.197 | 25 | |
| 19 | 8 | (Russia) Mikhail Kozlovskiy | Lukoil Lada Sport | Lada Granta | | 25 | +1 Lap | 22 | |
| 20 | 61 | (Macau) Kin Veng Ng | China Dragon Racing | Chevrolet Cruze LT | **Y** **A** | 25 | +1 Lap | 28 | |
| 21 | 88 | (Macau) Henry Ho | Liqui Moly Team Engstler | BMW 320si | **Y** **A** | 23 | +3 Laps | 26 | |
| 22 | 99 | (Japan) Takuya Izawa | Honda Racing Team JAS | Honda Civic WTCC | **A** | 19 | +7 Laps | 15 | |
| Ret | 22 | (United Kingdom) Tom Boardman | Special Tuning Racing | SEAT León WTCC | **Y** | 16 | | 23 | |
| Ret | 67 | (Japan) Hiroki Yoshimoto | NIKA Racing | Chevrolet Cruze 1.6T | **Y** **A** | 14 | | 17 | |
| Ret | 74 | (Spain) Pepe Oriola | Tuenti Racing Team | Chevrolet Cruze 1.6T | | 13 | | 4 | |
| Ret | 77 | (Macau) Mak Ka Lok | RPM Racing | BMW 320si | **Y** **A** | 10 | Race incident | 29 | |
| Ret | 5 | (Hungary) Norbert Michelisz | Zengő Motorsport | Honda Civic WTCC | | 1 | Race incident | 10 | |
| Ret | 60 | (Macau) Felipe De Souza | China Dragon Racing | Chevrolet Cruze LT | **Y** **A** | 1 | | 27 | |
| Ret | 12 | (France) Yvan Muller | RML | Chevrolet Cruze 1.6T | | 0 | Race incident | 7 | |

- **Bold** denotes Fastest lap.

== Standings after the event ==
Drivers' Championship standings

| | Pos | Driver | Points |
|---|---|---|---|
| | 1 | (France) Yvan Muller | 360 |
| 1 | 2 | (Italy) Gabriele Tarquini | 211 |
| 2 | 3 | (United Kingdom) Tom Chilton | 183 |
| | 4 | (United Kingdom) James Nash | 181 |
| 2 | 5 | (Denmark) Michel Nykjær | 180 |

Yokohama Independents' Trophy standings

| | Pos | Driver | Points |
|---|---|---|---|
| 1 | 1 | (United Kingdom) James Nash | 150 |
| 1 | 2 | (Denmark) Michel Nykjær | 134 |
| | 3 | (United Kingdom) Alex MacDowall | 118 |
| | 4 | (Morocco) Mehdi Bennani | 87 |
| | 5 | (Italy) Stefano D'Aste | 74 |

Manufacturers' Championship standings

| Pos | Manufacturer | Points |
|---|---|---|
| 1 | (Japan) Honda | 848 |
| 2 | (Russia) Lada | 519 |

- Note: Only the top five positions are included for both sets of drivers' standings.
