= PAS Macau Racing Team =

- Team principal(s): Eurico de Jesus
- Current series: TCR Asia Series
- Former series: World Touring Car Championship
- Noted drivers: TCR Asia; 29. (Macau) Henry Ho

PAS Macau Racing Team is a Macanese auto racing team based in Taipa, Macau. The team currently races in the TCR Asia Series. Having previously competed in the World Touring Car Championship in 2013.

== World Touring Car Championship ==
=== Honda Accord Euro-R (2013) ===
The team entered the 2013 World Touring Car Championship season with Eurico de Jesus driving a Honda Accord Euro R.

== TCR Asia Series ==
=== Honda Civic TCR (2015–) ===
The team will enter the 2015 TCR Asia Series season with Henry Ho driving a Honda Civic TCR.
