= Jerónimo Badaraco =

Macanese racing driver

- Nationality: (Macau) Macanese
- Born: 15 November 1974 (age 51) Portuguese Macau

Macau Touring Car Championship career
- Debut season: 2011
- Current team: Macau David Racing Team
- Car number: 66
- Best finish: 2nd in 2012

Previous series
- 2013 2007-08: WTCC; Asian Touring Car Series

Jerónimo António Badaraco Belem (born 15 November 1974) is a Macanese racing driver. He made his debut in 2013 as a former World Touring Car Championship driver, and he is currently competing in the Macau Touring Car Championship.

== Racing career ==
Badaraco began his career in 2007 in the Asian Touring Car Series. In 2011, he switched to the Macau Touring Car Championship. In 2013, Badaraco made his World Touring Car Championship debut with Son Veng Racing Team driving a Chevrolet Cruze LT in the last three rounds of the championship.

== Racing record ==
=== Complete World Touring Car Championship results ===
(key) (Races in bold indicate pole position – 1 point awarded just in first race; races in italics indicate fastest lap – 1 point awarded all races; * signifies that driver led race for at least one lap – 1 point given all races)

Year	Team	Car	1	2	3	4	5	6	7	8	9	10	11	12	13	14	15	16	17	18	19	20	21	22	23	24	DC	Pts
2013	Son Veng Racing Team	Chevrolet Cruze LT	ITA; 1	ITA; 2	MAR; 1	MAR; 2	SVK; 1	SVK; 2	HUN; 1	HUN; 2	AUT; 1	AUT; 2	RUS; 1	RUS; 2	POR; 1	POR; 2	ARG; 1	ARG; 2	USA; 1	USA; 2	JPN; 1; 20	JPN; 2; 18	CHN; 1; 24	CHN; 2 Ret	MAC; 1; 25	MAC; 2 Ret	NC	0
