= Son Veng Racing Team =

(Macau) Son Veng Racing Team
- Founded: 2008
- Team principal(s): Kelvin Leong
- Current series: TCR International Series; TCR Asia Series
- Former series: Macau Road Sport Challenge; World Touring Car Championship
- Noted drivers: TCR; 64. (China) Neric Wei; TCR Asia; 14. (China) Neric Wei

Son Veng Racing Team is a Macanese auto racing team based in Taipa, Macau. The team has raced in the TCR International Series, since 2016. Having previously raced in the World Touring Car Championship and the Macau Road Sport Challenge amongst others.

== World Touring Car Championship ==
=== Honda Accord Euro R (2012) ===
Having raced in the Macau Touring Car Championship for many season, the team entered the 2012 FIA WTCC Race of China with team owner and driver Kelvin Leong driving a Honda Accord Euro R. Leong qualified twenty fifth on the grid and finished fifteenth in race one and retired from the second race.

=== Chevrolet Cruze LT (2013) ===
Returning to the championship again in 2013, the team entered Jerónimo Badaraco for three final rounds of the season, driving a Chevrolet Cruze LT. Badaraco finished sixth in the Eurosport Asia Trophy standings, having a best finish of eighteenth in the second race in Japan.

== TCR Asia Series ==
Returning to international racing, the team entered the 2016 TCR Asia Series with Neric Wei driving a Volkswagen Golf GTI TCR. Having missed the first two rounds in South Korea and Thailand, the team debuted in Chinese round held in Shanghai. Wei finished sixth in race one and fourth in race two.

== TCR International Series ==
=== Volkswagen Golf GTI TCR (2016–) ===
After having raced in the 2016 TCR Asia Series, the team entered the 2016 TCR International Series with TCR Asia regular driver Neric Wei driving a Volkswagen Golf GTI TCR. Wei finished fifteenth in race one and was disqualified from the second race, after having originally retired from the race, having made contact with the spinning car of Rafaël Galiana.
