= 2013 FIA WTCC Race of Italy =

Race details
- Round 1 of 12 in the 2013 World Touring Car Championship at Autodromo Nazionale di Monza in Monza, Italy.
- Date: 24 March, 2013
- Location: Monza, Italy
- Course: Autodromo Nazionale di Monza; 5.793 kilometres (3.600 mi)

Race One
- Laps: 12
Pole position
Driver		(France) Yvan Muller	RML
Time		1:56.486	
Podium
First		(France) Yvan Muller	RML
Second		(United Kingdom) Tom Chilton	RML
Third		(United Kingdom) Alex MacDowall	bamboo-engineering
Fastest Lap
Driver		(United Kingdom) Tom Chilton	RML
Time		2:18.673	

Race Two
- Laps: 10
Podium
First		(France) Yvan Muller	RML
Second		(Denmark) Michel Nykjær	NIKA Racing
Third		(Italy) Gabriele Tarquini	Castrol Honda Team
Fastest Lap
Driver		(Spain) Pepe Oriola	Tuenti Racing Team
Time		2:17.987	

The 2013 FIA WTCC Race of Italy (formally the 2013 FIA WTCC Bet–At–Home Race of Italy) was the opening round of the 2013 World Touring Car Championship season and the ninth running of the FIA WTCC Race of Italy. It was held on 24 March 2013 at the Autodromo Nazionale di Monza in Monza, Italy.

Both races were won by Yvan Muller of RML. Both Tom Chilton and Alex MacDowall finished on the podium for the first time in their World Touring Car Championship careers in race one. The NIKA Racing team finished on the podium for the first time in race two with their driver Michel Nykjær.

== Background ==
All the cars started on an equal base weight of 1,150 kg, with the exception of the championship winning Chevrolet Cruze 1.6Ts which ran with the additional maximum compensation ballast of 40 kg.

== Report ==
=== Free Practice ===
RML Chevrolet driver Muller set the pace in the first free practice session. Tiago Monteiro second was the fastest Honda, Pepe Oriola in third was the fastest SEAT driver, James Thompson in seventh was the fastest Lada and Tom Coronel was the best placed BMW driver in ninth. Liqui Moly Team Engstler driver Charles Ng spun off at and hit the barriers at the Della Roggia chicane, damaging the front of his BMW 320 TC but he was able to return to the pits.

Chevrolets filled the top five places at the end of the final practice session. Muller led bamboo-engineering's MacDowall in second and James Nash fourth. Chilton was third and the NIKA Racing car of Nykjær was fifth.

=== Qualifying ===
Muller took pole position for race one, leading an RML 1–2. The first part of qualifying saw multiple incidents with reigning champion Robert Huff colliding Fredy Barth less than three minutes into the session. The incident broke Huff's suspension and the session was stopped while the SEAT was removed from the circuit. When the session resumed, the two Ladas collided with Aleksei Dudukalo missed the braking point for the first chicane and went straight into the side of Thompson's car. Thompson was already through to Q2 and he returned to the pits for repairs. Honda driver Gabriele Tarquini tapped René Münnich into a spin just before the end of the session and the getting a black and white flag. His team–mate Monteiro failed to get through to the second session while the Zengő Motorsport car of Norbert Michelisz 21st having suffered from brake problems.

After repairs, Thompson was able to get out in the second session to finish ninth and a front row start on the reversed grid for race two behind the ROAL Motorsport car of Darryl O'Young. At the end of the ten-minute shoot–out Muller led an RML 1–2 with Chilton second and MacDowall third the leading independent driver in the Bamboo Chevrolet. Oriola was the best placed SEAT in fourth with Tarquini fifth after another eventful session. The best placed ALL-INKL.COM Münnich Motorsport driver Marc Basseng was eighth on his debut in the World Touring Car Championship. Nykjær had stopped on the circuit near the end of the session with a puncture.

After the session two drivers were given grid penalties for the first race, Tarquini was issued with a five–place grid penalty for spinning Münnich while Dudukalo was given a five–place grid drop for his collision with Thompson.

=== Warm-Up ===
Stefano D'Aste topped the wet warm–up session on Sunday morning with pole sitter Muller fourth. Jean-Philippe Dayraut did not take part in the session.

Lukoil Lada Sport withdrew both of their cars prior to the races as neither could be repaired in time after their qualifying crash.

=== Race One ===
The race was started behind the safety car with Muller on pole position. The race got off to a slow start with very few places changing hands. Nykjær returned to the pits on lap three with a driveshaft failure but he returned to the track after repairs. D'Aste spun on exit of Ascari on lap four and hit the barriers, skating over the track and then hitting the barriers on the other side before coming to a halt. Further up the field Basseng and Tarquini engaged in battle for 6th place before the safety car came out at the end of the lap 5 while the stricken BMW of D'Aste was removed. The race resumed on lap seven and Tarquini got past Nash to take fifth while Monteiro was also moving up the order. By lap eight Huff had made his way up the field to tenth place, displacing Tom Boardman from the final points position. Oriola ran wide at the second Lesmo with Tarquini moving up to fourth, Basseng then went through the gravel moments later. Boardman and Huff came across the line side–by–side at the start of lap nine but Huff failed to stop for the first corner and used the cut through for the second time during the race. Basseng was then issued with a drive–through penalty for not having all his wheels down on the grid at the three-minute warning. Barth touched O'Young on lap nine and the ROAL Motorsport car went off the track and through the gravel but returned to the track. Huff moved further up the order on lap ten, taking sixth place from Nash. Nash and Boardman then came together on lap eleven, breaking the steering arm on the SEAT and forcing Boardman to stop on the track. The race was completed with yellow flags in the second sector, Muller took the first win of the season with Chilton second to take his first podium result in the WTCC. MacDowall also finished on the outright podium for the first time and took the independents' victory. The factory Hondas of Tarquini and Monteiro finished fourth and fifth.

=== Race Two ===
Huff and Boardman started from the pit lane after their cars were repaired. Tarquini jumped up to second at the start behind pole sitter O'Young, he then took the lead at Curva Grande while Basseng was in third. Basseng then passed O'Young to go up to second. Nykjær and Muller then passed O'Young before the end of the first lap. Münnich went into the pits at the end of the first lap. Dayraut, Mehdi Bennani, Fernando Monje and MacDowall all took the escape round at the first chicane on lap three due to the slippery conditions at the end of the pit straight. On the same lap Muller moved up to third attempted a move on Basseng at the Parabolica. Basseng ran deep at the first chicane the following lap and this allowed Muller to take second place, the RML driver then taking the lead from Tarquini the same lap. Bennani was issued with a drive–through penalty on lap five for exceeding track limits. Further back Nash was defending his fifth place from Oriola and Chilton behind and soon after Oriola missed the chicane and allowed Chilton to move up to sixth behind Nash. Nearer the front, Basseng missed the first chicane and dropped down to fourth behind Nykjær. The NIKA Racing driver was now closely following Tarquini on lap seven and succeeded in moving up to second by the end of the lap. Tarquini then retook the place on lap eight before Nykjær moved back in front once again. Basseng was closing in on third placed Tarquini in the final laps and the two were running nose–to–tail. Tarquini narrowly ended up third at the finish line where Muller had finished first ahead of Nykjær who was the independent victor.

== Results ==
=== Qualifying ===
Pos.	No.	Name	Team	Car	C	Q1	Q2	Points
1	12	(France) Yvan Muller	RML	Chevrolet Cruze 1.6T		1:56.622	1:56.486	**5**
2	23	(United Kingdom) Tom Chilton	RML	Chevrolet Cruze 1.6T		1:57.510	1:57.345	**4**
3	9	(United Kingdom) Alex MacDowall	bamboo-engineering	Chevrolet Cruze 1.6T	Y	1:58.172	1:57.685	**3**
4	74	(Spain) Pepe Oriola	Tuenti Racing Team	SEAT León WTCC		1:58.311	1:57.833	**2**
5	3	(Italy) Gabriele Tarquini	Castrol Honda World Touring Car Team	Honda Civic WTCC		1:58.473	1:57.946	**1**
6	14	(United Kingdom) James Nash	bamboo-engineering	Chevrolet Cruze 1.6T	Y	1:58.402	1:58.005	
7	17	(Denmark) Michel Nykjær	NIKA Racing	Chevrolet Cruze 1.6T	Y	1:57.899	1:58.172	
8	38	(Germany) Marc Basseng	ALL-INKL.COM Münnich Motorsport	SEAT León WTCC		1:58.702	1:58.518	
9	10	(United Kingdom) James Thompson	Lukoil Lada Sport	Lada Granta		1:58.722	1:58.669	
10	55	(Hong Kong) **Darryl O'Young**	ROAL Motorsport	BMW 320 TC	Y	1:58.685	1:58.781	
11	19	(Spain) Fernando Monje	Campos Racing	SEAT León WTCC	Y	1:58.958	1:58.814	
12	26	(Italy) Stefano D'Aste	PB Racing	BMW 320 TC	Y	1:59.044	2:00.475	
13	6	(Germany) Franz Engstler	Liqui Moly Team Engstler	BMW 320 TC	Y	1:59.046		
14	22	(United Kingdom) Tom Boardman	Special Tuning Racing	SEAT León WTCC	Y	1:59.116		
15	18	(Portugal) Tiago Monteiro	Castrol Honda World Touring Car Team	Honda Civic WTCC		1:59.155		
16	11	(Russia) Aleksei Dudukalo	Lukoil Lada Sport	Lada Granta		1:59.303		
17	15	(Netherlands) Tom Coronel	ROAL Motorsport	BMW 320 TC		1:59.386		
18	25	(Morocco) Mehdi Bennani	Proteam Racing	BMW 320 TC	Y	1:59.685		
19	37	(Germany) René Münnich	ALL-INKL.COM Münnich Motorsport	SEAT León WTCC	Y	1:59.978		
20	73	(Switzerland) Fredy Barth	Wiechers-Sport	BMW 320 TC	Y	2:00.090		
21	5	(Hungary) Norbert Michelisz	Zengő Motorsport	Honda Civic WTCC		2:00.799		
22	7	(Hong Kong) Charles Ng	Liqui Moly Team Engstler	BMW 320 TC	Y	2:00.901		
23	13	(France) Jean-Philippe Dayraut	ANOME	BMW 320 TC	Y	2:00.957		
107% time: 2:04.785
–	1	(United Kingdom) Robert Huff	ALL-INKL.COM Münnich Motorsport	SEAT León WTCC		no time set		

- **Bold** denotes Pole position for second race.

=== Race 1 ===
Pos.	No.	Name	Team	Car	C	Laps	Time/Retired	Grid	Points
1	12	(France) Yvan Muller	RML	Chevrolet Cruze 1.6T		12	30:02.783	1	25
2	23	(United Kingdom) **Tom Chilton**	RML	Chevrolet Cruze 1.6T		12	+0.923	2	18
3	9	(United Kingdom) Alex MacDowall	bamboo-engineering	Chevrolet Cruze 1.6T	Y	12	+5.101	3	15
4	3	(Italy) Gabriele Tarquini	Castrol Honda World Touring Car Team	Honda Civic WTCC		12	+8.053	9	12
5	18	(Portugal) Tiago Monteiro	Castrol Honda World Touring Car Team	Honda Civic WTCC		12	+15.261	14	10
6	1	(United Kingdom) Robert Huff	ALL-INKL.COM Münnich Motorsport	SEAT León WTCC		12	+17.349	22	8
7	14	(United Kingdom) James Nash	bamboo-engineering	Chevrolet Cruze 1.6T	Y	12	+19.964	5	6
8	5	(Hungary) Norbert Michelisz	Zengő Motorsport	Honda Civic WTCC		12	+20.338	19	4
9	15	(Netherlands) Tom Coronel	ROAL Motorsport	BMW 320 TC		12	+28.837	15	2
10	73	(Switzerland) Fredy Barth	Wiechers-Sport	BMW 320 TC	Y	12	+37.740	18	1
11	13	(France) Jean-Philippe Dayraut	ANOME	BMW 320 TC	Y	12	+39.226	21	
12	19	(Spain) Fernando Monje	Campos Racing	SEAT León WTCC	Y	12	+41.656	10	
13	55	(Hong Kong) Darryl O'Young	ROAL Motorsport	BMW 320 TC	Y	12	+48.116	8	
14	38	(Germany) Marc Basseng	ALL-INKL.COM Münnich Motorsport	SEAT León WTCC		12	+50.920	7	
15	7	(Hong Kong) Charles Ng	Liqui Moly Team Engstler	BMW 320 TC	Y	12	+54.412	20	
16	37	(Germany) René Münnich	ALL-INKL.COM Münnich Motorsport	SEAT León WTCC	Y	12	+58.733	17	
17	25	(Morocco) Mehdi Bennani	Proteam Racing	BMW 320 TC	Y	12	+2:05.913	16	
18	22	(United Kingdom) Tom Boardman	Special Tuning Racing	SEAT León WTCC	Y	10	+2 Laps	13	
19	6	(Germany) Franz Engstler	Liqui Moly Team Engstler	BMW 320 TC	Y	9	+3 Laps	12	
20	17	(Denmark) Michel Nykjær	NIKA Racing	Chevrolet Cruze 1.6T	Y	9	+3 Laps	6	
Ret	74	(Spain) Pepe Oriola	Tuenti Racing Team	SEAT León WTCC		8	Puncture	4	
Ret	26	(Italy) Stefano D'Aste	PB Racing	BMW 320 TC	Y	3	Race incident	11	
DNS	10	(United Kingdom) James Thompson	Lukoil Lada Sport	Lada Granta		0	Did not start	–	
DNS	11	(Russia) Aleksei Dudukalo	Lukoil Lada Sport	Lada Granta		0	Did not start	–	

- **Bold** denotes Fastest lap.

=== Race 2 ===
Pos.	No.	Name	Team	Car	C	Laps	Time/Retired	Grid	Points
1	12	(France) Yvan Muller	RML	Chevrolet Cruze 1.6T		10	23:27.254	9	25
2	17	(Denmark) Michel Nykjær	NIKA Racing	Chevrolet Cruze 1.6T	Y	10	+2.482	3	18
3	3	(Italy) Gabriele Tarquini	Castrol Honda World Touring Car Team	Honda Civic WTCC		10	+4.994	5	15
4	38	(Germany) Marc Basseng	ALL-INKL.COM Münnich Motorsport	SEAT León WTCC		10	+5.081	2	12
5	23	(United Kingdom) Tom Chilton	RML	Chevrolet Cruze 1.6T		10	+5.612	8	10
6	74	(Spain) **Pepe Oriola**	Tuenti Racing Team	SEAT León WTCC		10	+6.755	6	8
7	14	(United Kingdom) James Nash	bamboo-engineering	Chevrolet Cruze 1.6T	Y	10	+14.445	4	6
8	18	(Portugal) Tiago Monteiro	Castrol Honda World Touring Car Team	Honda Civic WTCC		10	+20.573	13	4
9	26	(Italy) Stefano D'Aste	PB Racing	BMW 320 TC	Y	10	+23.722	22	2
10	1	(United Kingdom) Robert Huff	ALL-INKL.COM Münnich Motorsport	SEAT León WTCC		10	+25.442	21^{1}	1
11	15	(Netherlands) Tom Coronel	ROAL Motorsport	BMW 320 TC		10	+37.126	14	
12	55	(Hong Kong) Darryl O'Young	ROAL Motorsport	BMW 320 TC	Y	10	+41.394	1	
13	6	(Germany) Franz Engstler	Liqui Moly Team Engstler	BMW 320 TC	Y	10	+43.904	11	
14	73	(Switzerland) Fredy Barth	Wiechers-Sport	BMW 320 TC	Y	10	+45.921	17	
15	19	(Spain) Fernando Monje	Campos Racing	SEAT León WTCC	Y	10	+50.678	10	
16	22	(United Kingdom) Tom Boardman	Special Tuning Racing	SEAT León WTCC	Y	10	+53.591	12^{1}	
17	7	(Hong Kong) Charles Ng	Liqui Moly Team Engstler	BMW 320 TC	Y	10	+59.157	19	
18	13	(France) Jean-Philippe Dayraut	ANOME	BMW 320 TC	Y	10	+1:06.537	20	
19	25	(Morocco) Mehdi Bennani	Proteam Racing	BMW 320 TC	Y	10	+1:26.721	15	
20	9	(United Kingdom) Alex MacDowall	bamboo-engineering	Chevrolet Cruze 1.6T	Y	9	+1 Lap	7	
21	37	(Germany) René Münnich	ALL-INKL.COM Münnich Motorsport	SEAT León WTCC	Y	9	+1 Lap	16	
22	5	(Hungary) Norbert Michelisz	Zengő Motorsport	Honda Civic WTCC		9	+1 Lap	18	
DNS	10	(United Kingdom) James Thompson	Lukoil Lada Sport	Lada Granta		0	Did not start	–	
DNS	11	(Russia) Aleksei Dudukalo	Lukoil Lada Sport	Lada Granta		0	Did not start	–	

- **Bold** denotes Fastest lap.

^1 — Boardman and Huff started from the pit lane.

== Standings after the event ==
Drivers' Championship standings

Pos	Driver	Points
1	(France) Yvan Muller	55
2	(United Kingdom) Tom Chilton	32
3	(Italy) Gabriele Tarquini	28
4	(Denmark) Michel Nykjær	18
5	(United Kingdom) Alex MacDowall	18

Yokohama Independents' Trophy standings

Pos	Driver	Points
1	(United Kingdom) James Nash	16
2	(United Kingdom) Alex MacDowall	12
3	(Denmark) Michel Nykjær	11
4	(Switzerland) Fredy Barth	9
5	(Hong Kong) Darryl O'Young	8

Manufacturers' Championship standings

Pos	Manufacturer	Points
1	(Japan) Honda	94
2	(Russia) Lada	6

- Note: Only the top five positions are included for both sets of drivers' standings.
