= Tom Chilton =

Retired British racing driver (born 1985)

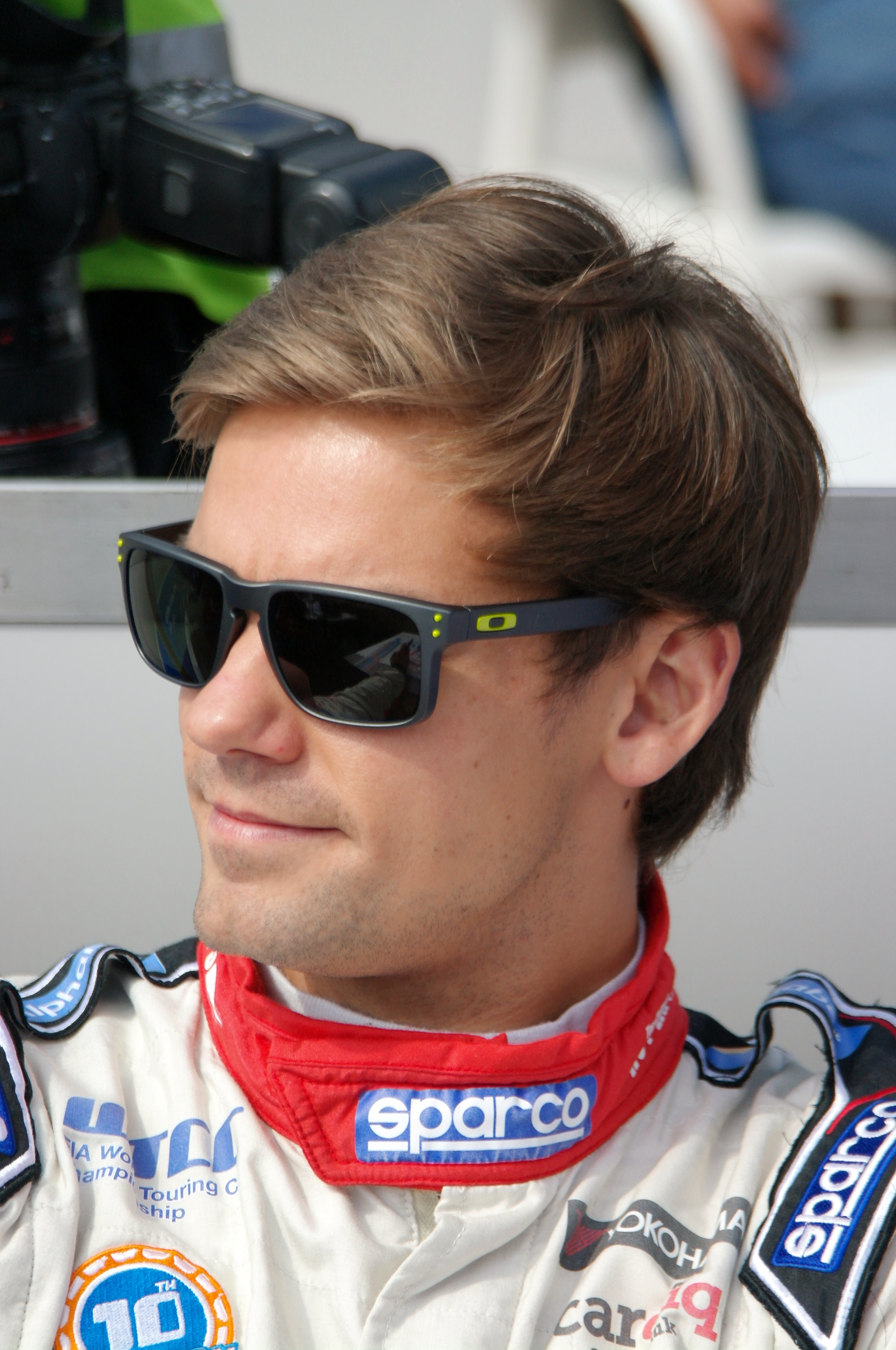
- Chilton at the 2014 FIA WTCC Race of Belgium
- Nationality: (United Kingdom) British
- Born: Thomas James Chilton; 15 March 1985 (age 41) Reigate, Surrey, England
- Relatives: Max Chilton (brother)

BTCC career
- Debut season: 2002
- Car number: 3
- Former teams: Team VERTU; Ciceley Motorsport; BTC Racing; Team Shredded Wheat Racing; Power Maxed Racing; Arena Motorsport; Team Halfords; VX Racing; Barwell Motorsport
- Starts: 563 (569 entries)
- Wins: 19
- Podiums: 73
- Poles: 11
- Fastest laps: 15
- Best finish: 3rd in 2018

Previous series
- 2012–2017 2005, 2007 2005, 2007 2000–01: WTCC; ALMS; Le Mans Series; T Cars

Championship titles
- 2017 2010: WTCC Independents' Trophy; BTCC Independents' Trophy

Thomas James Chilton (born 15 March 1985) is a retired British racing driver who last competed in the British Touring Car Championship for Team VERTU. He has spent most of his career competing in touring car racing, and his younger brother, Max, is also a racing driver.

== Career ==
=== Early life ===
Chilton was born in Reigate. His father, Grahame Chilton, is a businessman who co-owned the insurance company Benfield Group up until 2008, when it was taken over by Aon plc for £738m. Chilton became vice-chairman of Aon after the deal and also collected around £77m for his stake. Chilton was educated at Reigate St Mary's School and Shiplake College. A keen racer from an early age, he competed in the BRSCC T Cars Championship in 1999 and 2000, going on to take the BRSCC Saloon Car winter championship in 2001. His brother, Max Chilton, is also a racing driver.

=== British Touring Car Championship ===
==== Barwell Motorsport (2002) ====
Turning his attention to the BTCC, Chilton was teammate to ex-Superbike racer Aaron Slight in 2002 driving a Vauxhall Astra Coupé for Barwell Motorsport. Having just turned 17, he was the series' youngest ever driver (until Aiden Moffat in 2013). He proved to be very quick, and although his lack of experience counted against him he nevertheless finished the season in 15th place overall and fifth in the Independents' Cup.

==== Arena Motorsport (2003–2005) ====
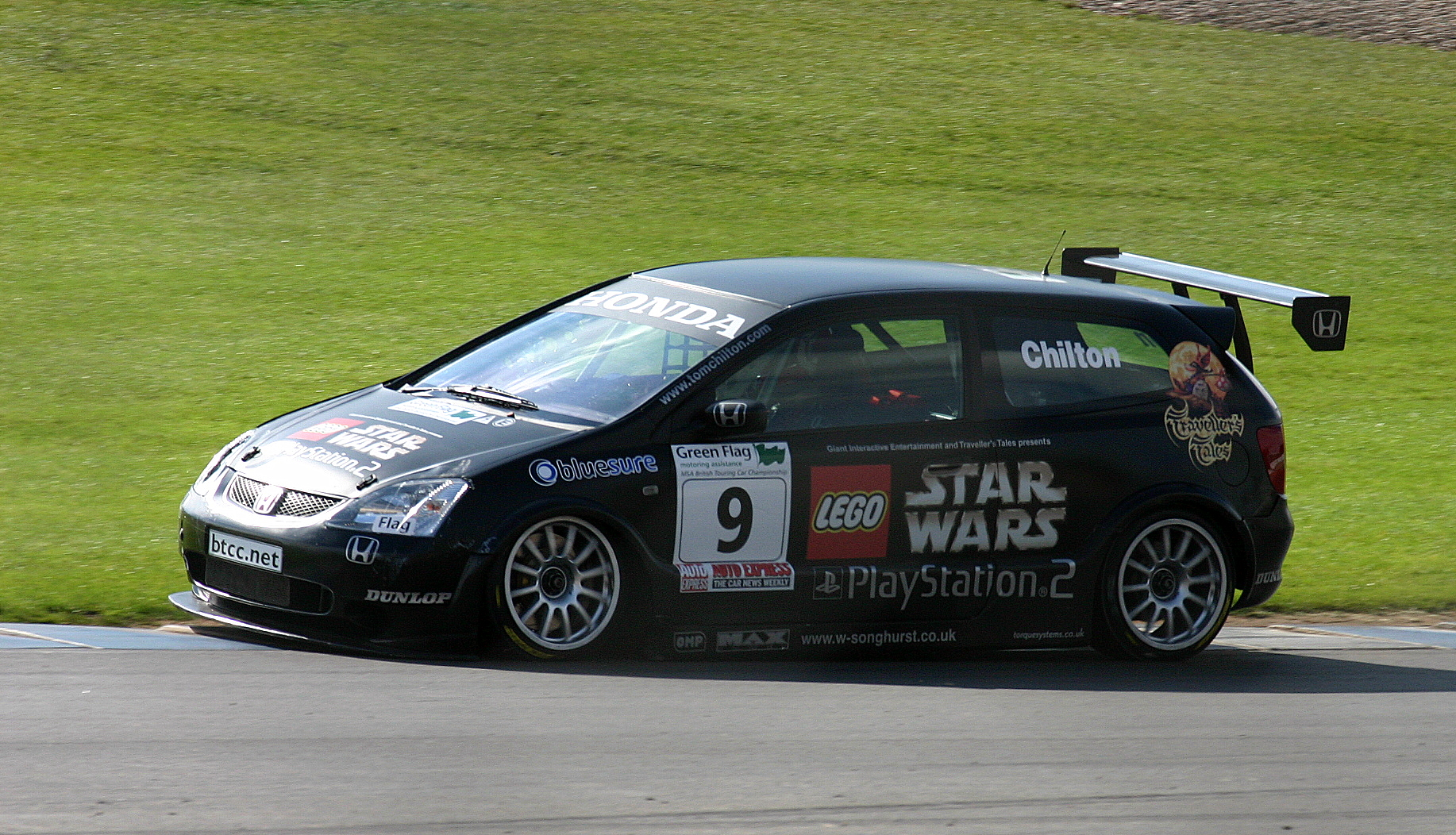
Chilton competing in the final round of the 2004 season at Donington Park.

In 2003, Chilton finished in ninth place overall driving a works Honda Civic Type-R run by Arena Motorsport alongside Matt Neal and Alan Morrison. With Honda withdrawing manufacturer support for 2004, Arena only had the budget to run a single car for Chilton. However, the car was still well-prepared and he came through to take his first victory during the ninth race of the season, at Silverstone, in the process becoming the youngest winner of a BTCC race. He won again in the 29th race at Donington.

Chilton's plans for 2005 centred around the DTM with a new programme backed by MG Rover, but this fell through with the demise of the British marque. He and Arena rejoined the BTCC at the second meeting of the season and combined his touring car duties with racing for Zytek in the ALMS and LMS endurance series. Chilton won in both ALMS and LMS racing. He was classified fifth in the 2005 British Touring Car Championship despite only starting 24 of the 30 races. Chilton's involvement with Zytek continued, subject to funding and availability; Tom and his brother Max drove the car at the Silverstone 1000 km in September 2007.

==== VX Racing (2006–2007) ====
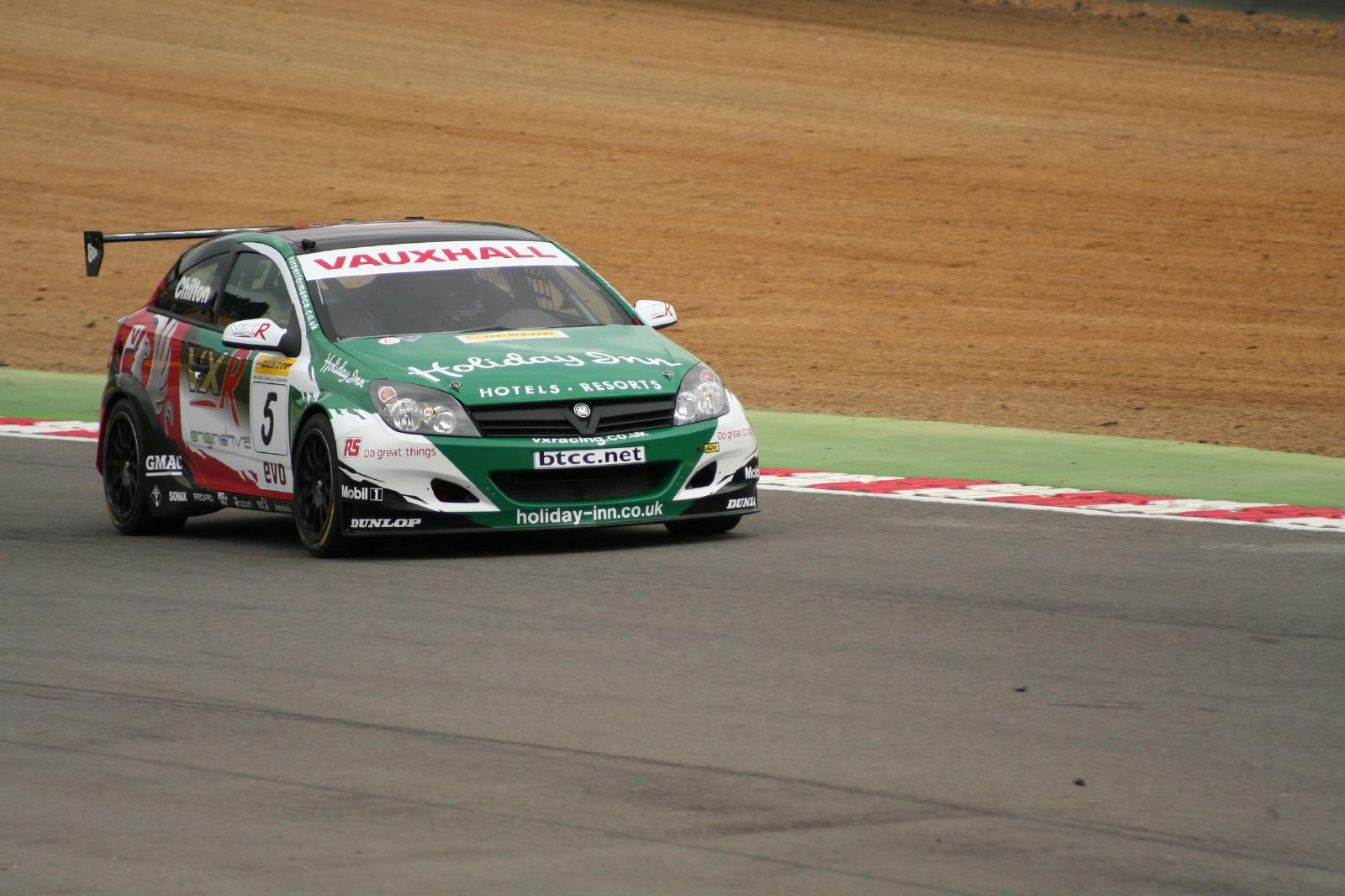
Chilton driving for VX Racing at Brands Hatch in the 2006 BTCC season

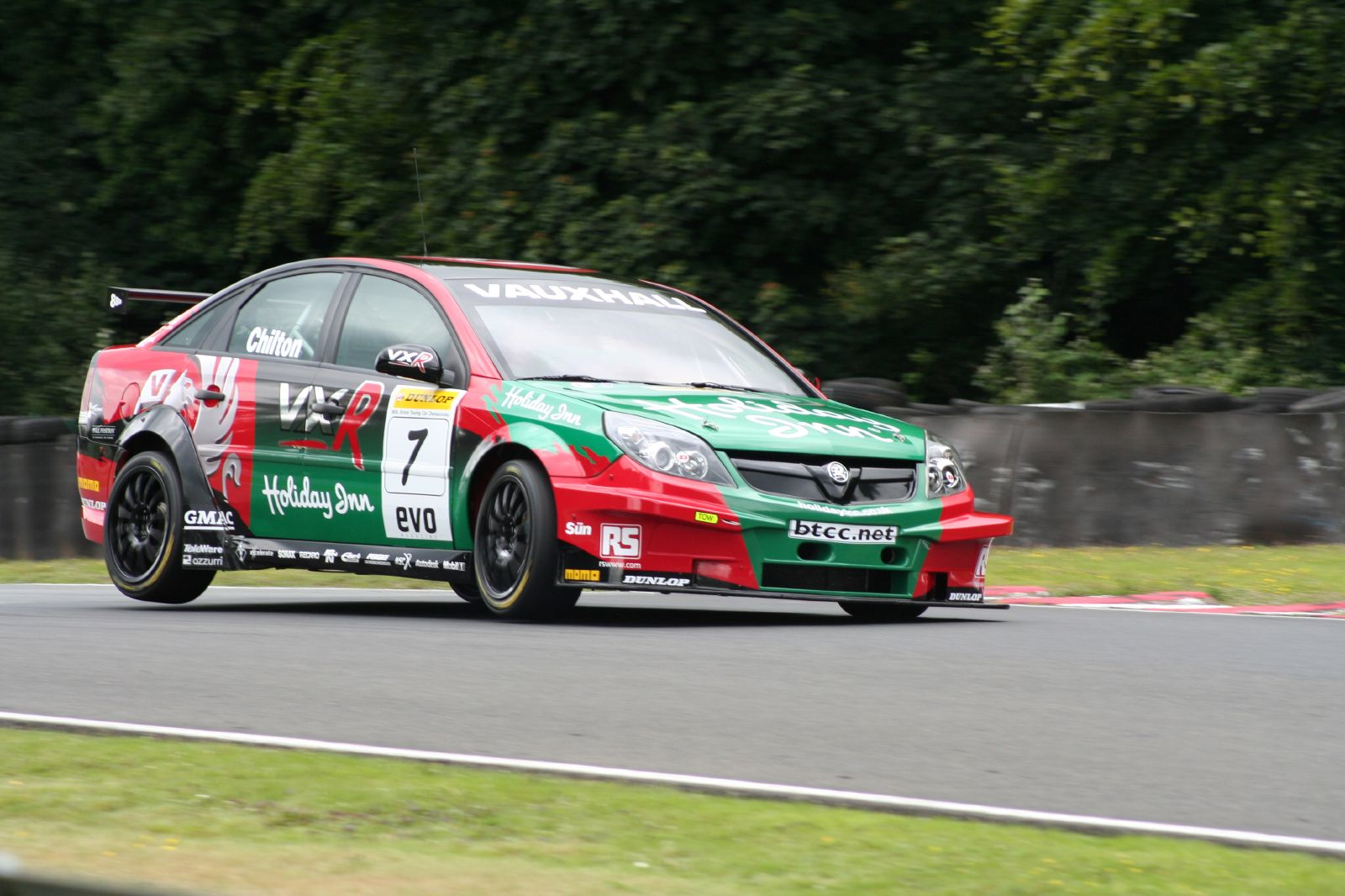
Chilton driving for VX Racing at Oulton Park during the 2007 BTCC season

VX Racing signed Chilton for 2006 to drive the No. 5 Vauxhall Astra Sport Hatch. In a disappointing season for Vauxhall, he never won a race and slipped to seventh overall. However, Vauxhall retained Chilton and Fabrizio Giovanardi for 2007, however the team built the car around Giovanardi. Chilton finished ninth overall. Chilton decided he did not want to stay at VX Racing in 2008.

==== Team Halfords (2008) ====
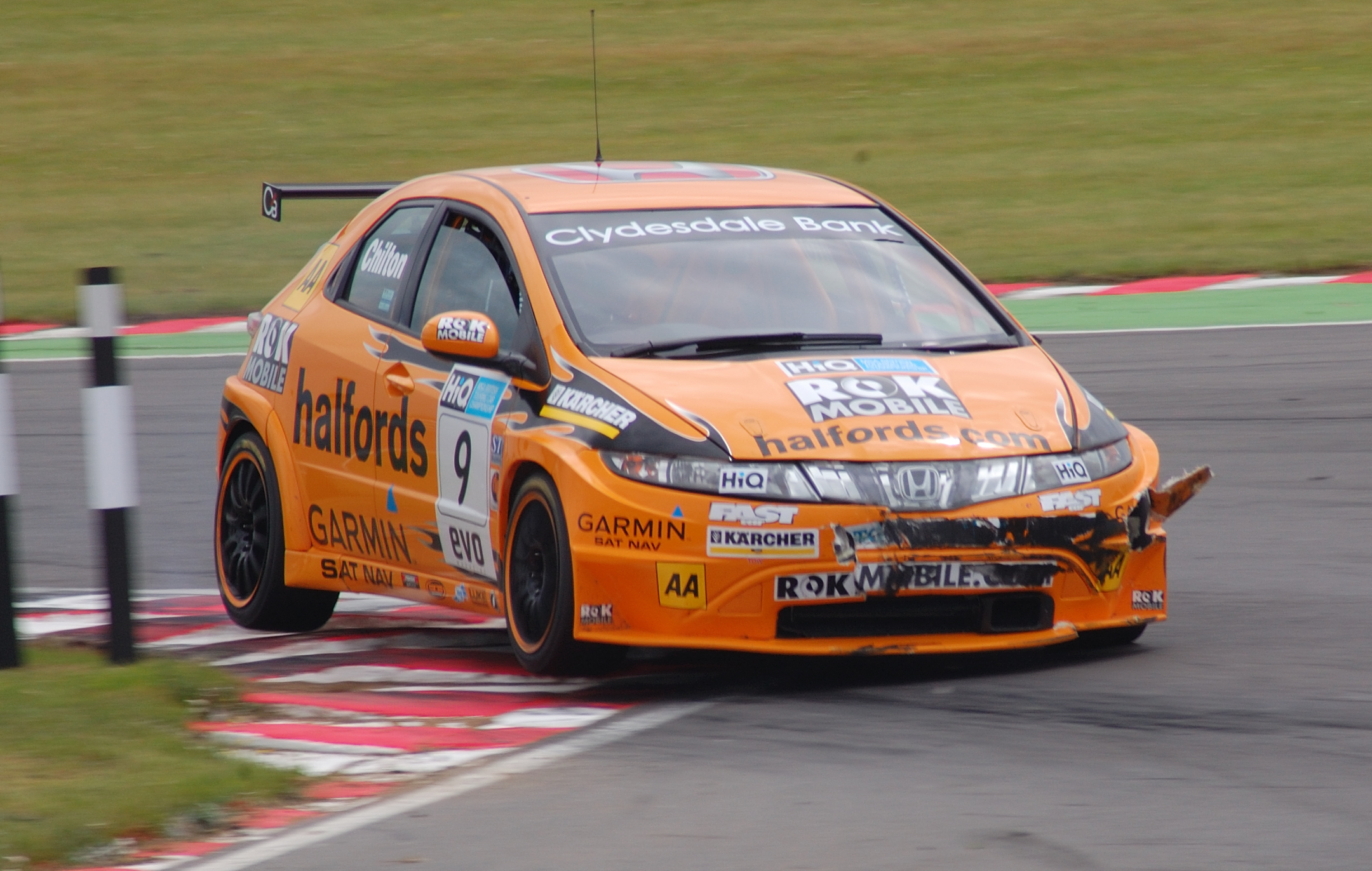
Chilton negotiating the chicane at Snetterton in 2008

Chilton left to partner Gordon Shedden at Team Dynamics for the 2008 BTCC season and replacing VX Racing-bound Matt Neal. In the final round of the championship, he won his first race since round 25 of the 2005 season with a dominant victory at Brands Hatch. This also ensured his tenth place in the championship.

==== Team Aon (2009–2011) ====
For 2009, Chilton returned to Arena Motorsport to drive a Ford Focus ST in the BTCC under the Team Aon banner, but spent much of the year developing the car and he ended the season 13th in the drivers' standings.

Chilton remained with the team for 2010. The LPG-powered car was more competitive, taking four of the first five poles, but bad luck meant teammate Tom Onslow-Cole took better results than Chilton initially. Both were on the podium in race two at Snetterton. At Silverstone, the team was dominant, and Chilton was allowed to take both wins ahead of teammate Tom Onslow-Cole. Onslow-Cole finished ahead in the overall drivers' championship but Chilton secured the Independents' Trophy by a two-point margin over Steven Kane.

For 2011, the team developed a new car based on the new third generation Ford Focus which ran to Super 2000 regulations powered by an NGTC turbocharged engine. Results were poor initially as the car was developed but Chilton took the car to pole position at Knockhill, going on to win race one. He also won the final race of the season at Silverstone. He finished the year seventh in the drivers' championship on 197 points.

=== World Touring Car Championship ===
==== Team Aon (2012) ====
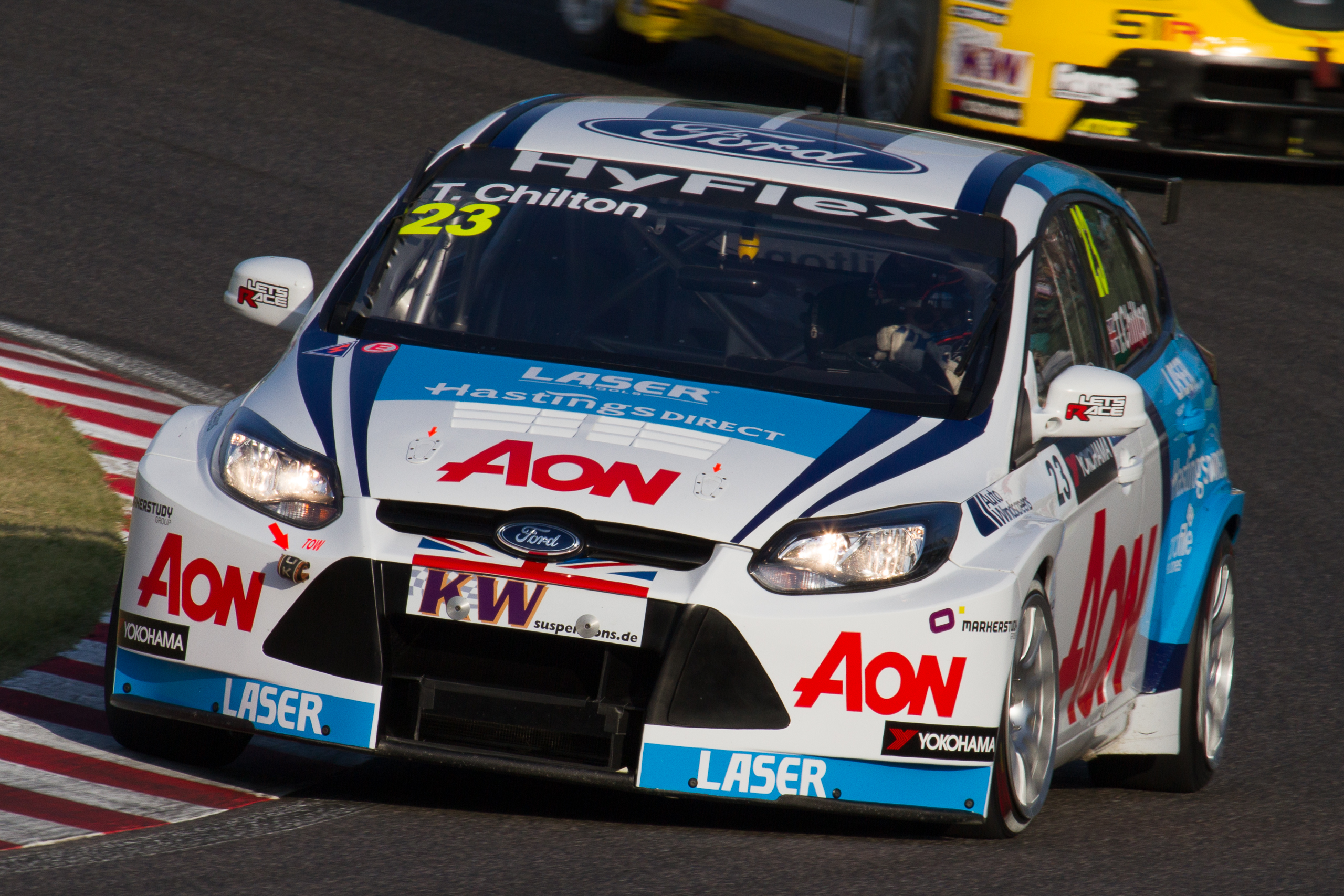
Chilton driving for Team Aon at the 2012 FIA WTCC Race of Japan

Chilton made his debut in the World Touring Car Championship in 2012, driving for the Arena Motorsport team with their Ford Focus S2000 TC alongside fellow WTCC debutant James Nash. Although he was new to the championship, Chilton was ruled out of the Yokohama Trophy due to his experience in the BTCC as both a privateer and a works driver. In race one in Morocco, he scored the first points for Ford in their WTCC return after coming home in seventh place. He scored another point in race two in Slovakia. Chilton was given a five place grid penalty for a collision during qualifying for the Race of Austria, he locked up down the inside of Franz Engstler and made contact, putting Engstler out of Q1. An engine change for both Fords at the Race of Japan sent Chilton to the back of the grid for the first race. In the final race at Macau, Chilton lost control in the oil left on the track from Alex MacDowall's collision with the barrier on lap 4, the subsequent crash forced him to retire. Chilton finished 19th in the drivers' standings, two places behind teammate Nash. After the season, the Arena Motorsport suspended their WTCC programme after losing technical backing from Ford and closed down, leaving Chilton without a drive for 2013.

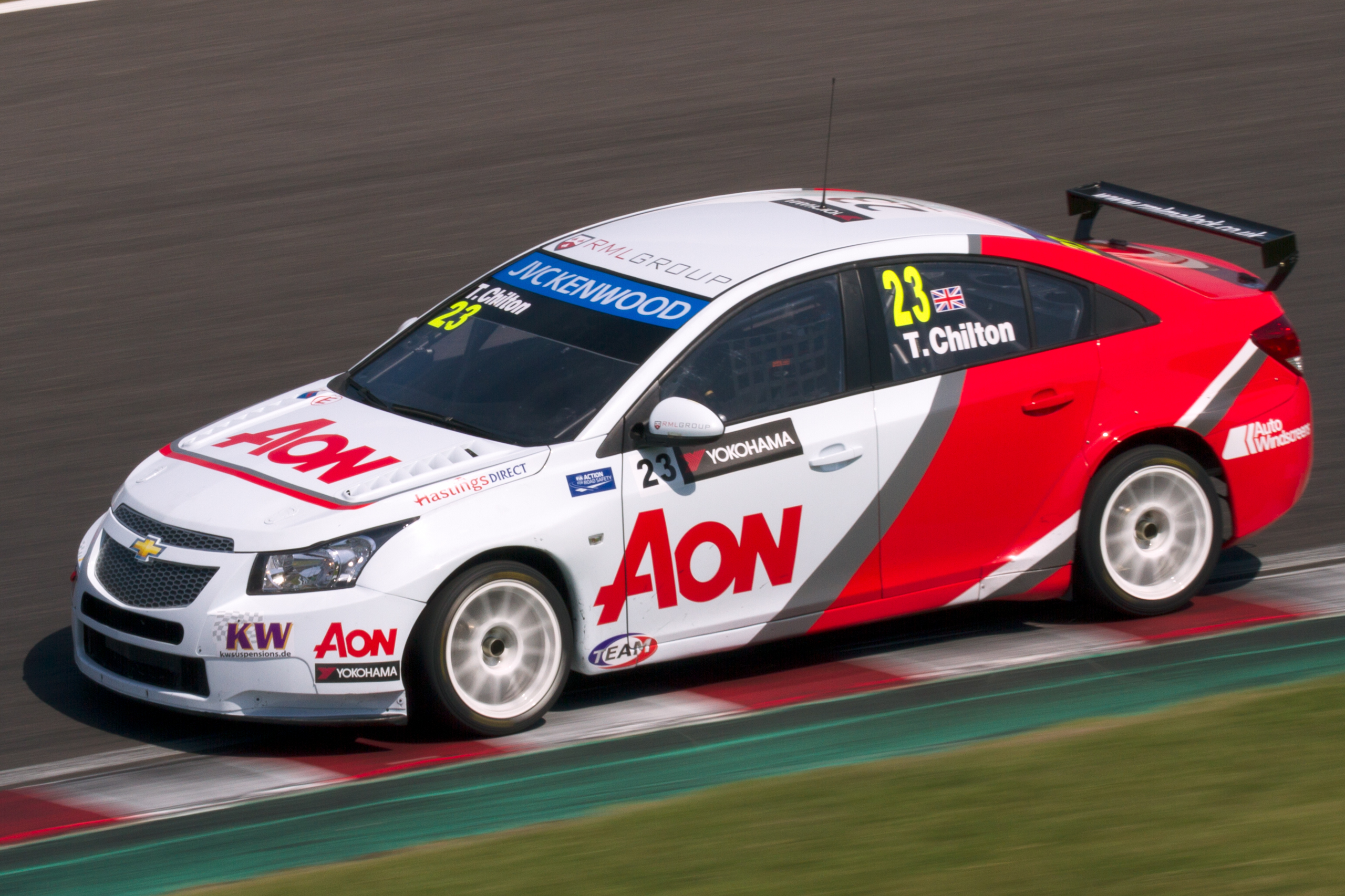
Chilton competing in the 2013 World Touring Car Championship

==== RML (2013) ====
Chilton moved to RML for the 2013 season, driving a Chevrolet Cruze 1.6T alongside former world champion Yvan Muller. He finished second behind Muller at the season opening Race of Italy He took his first WTCC pole position at the Race of the United States, beating teammate Muller. From pole he held off Tiago Monteiro to claim his first race win in the World Touring Car Championship. During the final race of the season, the 2013 Guia Race of Macau, Chilton dropped out with exhaust problems but not before being involved in the accident that caused the second red flag of race 2, as Eurico de Jesus hit him and under the subsequent safety car multiple drivers barreled into each other at the scene to cause the red flag.

==== ROAL Motorsport (2014–2015) ====
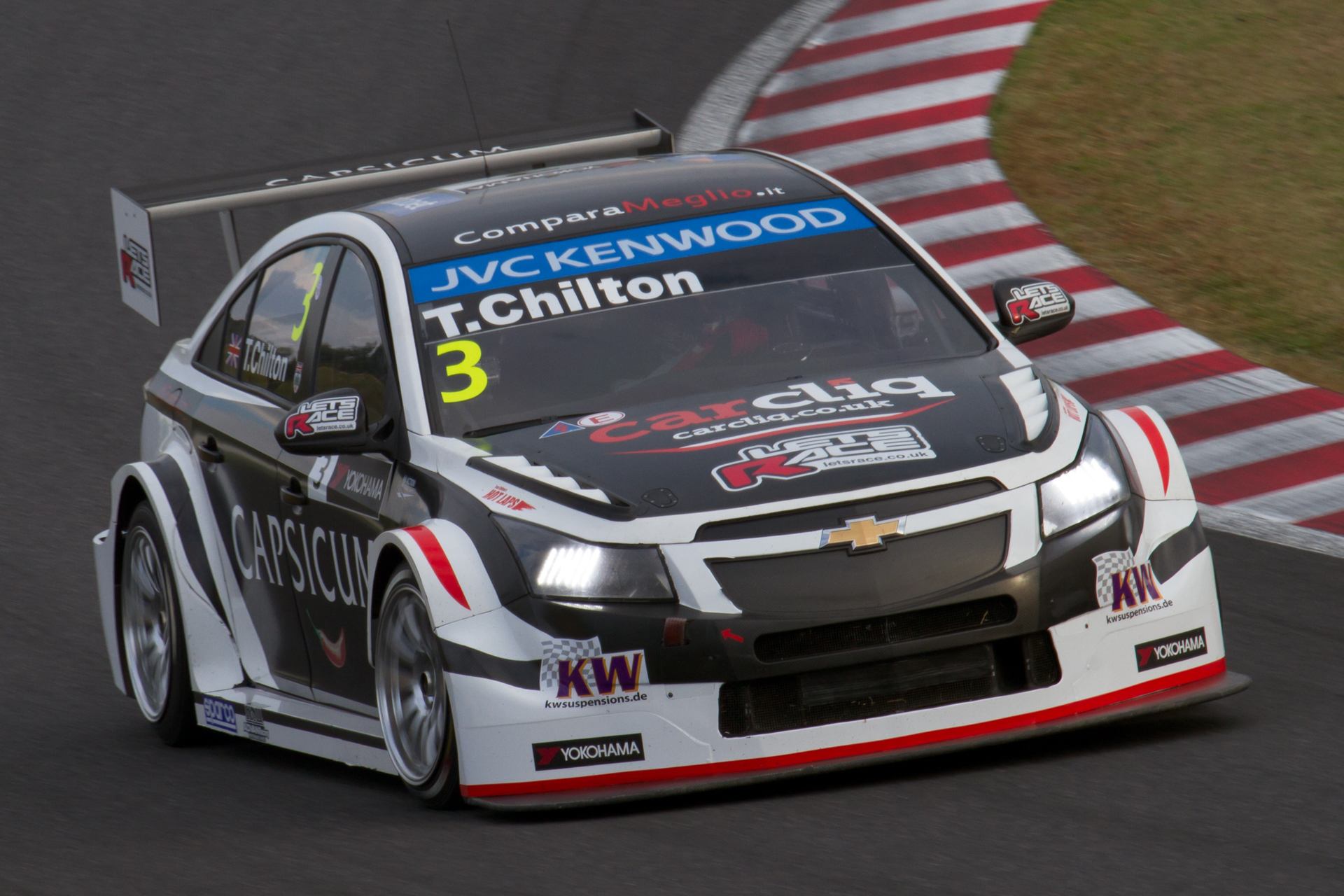
Chilton competing in the 2014 World Touring Car Championship

On 12 December 2013, Chilton announced that in 2014 he would drive the No. 3 car for the Italian-based team ROAL Motorsport in an all-new Chevrolet Cruze to be built by RML under the new TC1 regulations. His teammate in the season will be Dutch driver Tom Coronel. Chilton managed to take pole, fastest lap and victory in the first race at Beijing becoming the only non-Citroen driver to win the first race of any race weekend in 2014. A second-place finish followed in Japan and Chilton ended the season in 8th place. He continued with ROAL Motorsport in 2015.

==== Sébastien Loeb Racing (2016–2017) ====
In 2016 Chilton raced in a Citroën for Sébastien Loeb Racing, together with Moroccan driver Mehdi Bennani. Chilton won the race in Argentina. He took six podiums in that season. In independents, Chilton managed to finish 2nd in the standings after losing to Mehdi Bennani, who secured his independents title in Shanghai due to advantage for his DNF after contact with Gabriele Tarquini in Race 1.

Chilton continued as a Sébastien Loeb Racing driver in the 2017 WTCC season. He took 3 wins in that season at Monza, Motegi, and Losail. When he won at Losail, Chilton also claimed his independent's title in 20th and final race of the season. When he won the independent's title, in overall standings, Chilton finished third behind two championship contenders, Norbert Michelisz and that season's champion, Thed Björk. Also, it was the last race under "World Championship" name before changed into World Touring Car Cup.

=== Return to British Touring Car Championship ===
==== Power Maxed Racing (2017) ====
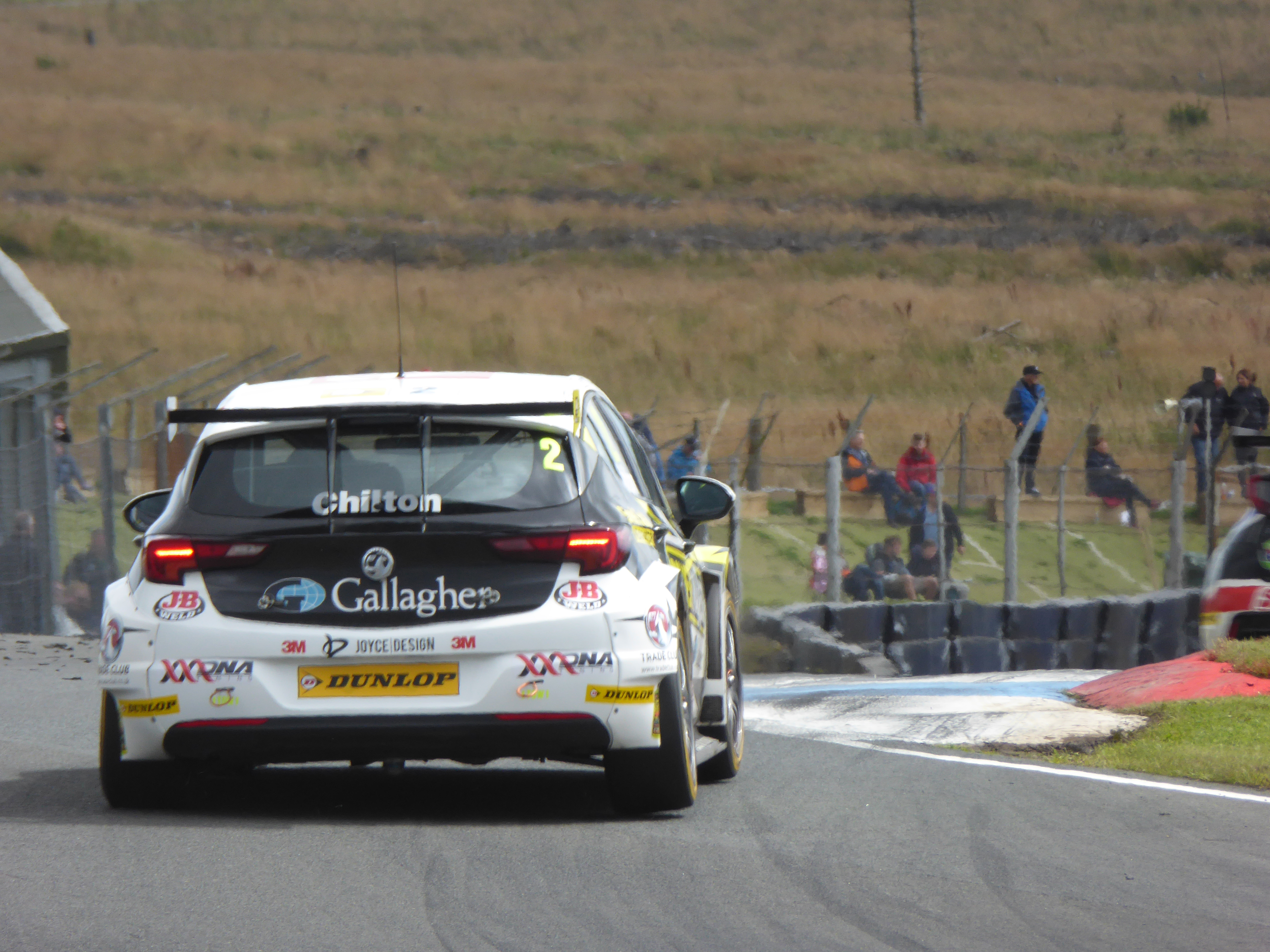
Chilton, at the Knockhill round of the 2017 British Touring Car Championship

After five seasons absent, Chilton returned to the BTCC in 2017, driving a factory-supported Power Maxed Racing Vauxhall Astra. He took a third-place finish in the third race at the opening round at Brands Hatch, after starting from pole.

==== Team Shredded Wheat Racing with Gallagher (2018–2019) ====
On 20 December 2017, Chilton decided to focus on his BTCC career. Signing into the team who have won the 2016 Independents title, Motorbase Performance under the name of Team Shredded Wheat Racing with Gallagher due to its sponsorship. Chilton took his first win after 2011, winning at Knockhill after started from pole in third race.

==== BTC Racing (2020) ====
On 10 January 2020, it was announced that Chilton would join the BTC Racing team for the upcoming season as part of an expanded three-car team. Chilton took a best finish of second at Thruxon and finished tenth in the Driver's Championship and fourth in the Independent Driver's Championship.

==== Ciceley Motorsport (2021) ====
On 12 January 2021, Ciceley Motorsport announced that Chilton would be joining the team for the 2021 Season.

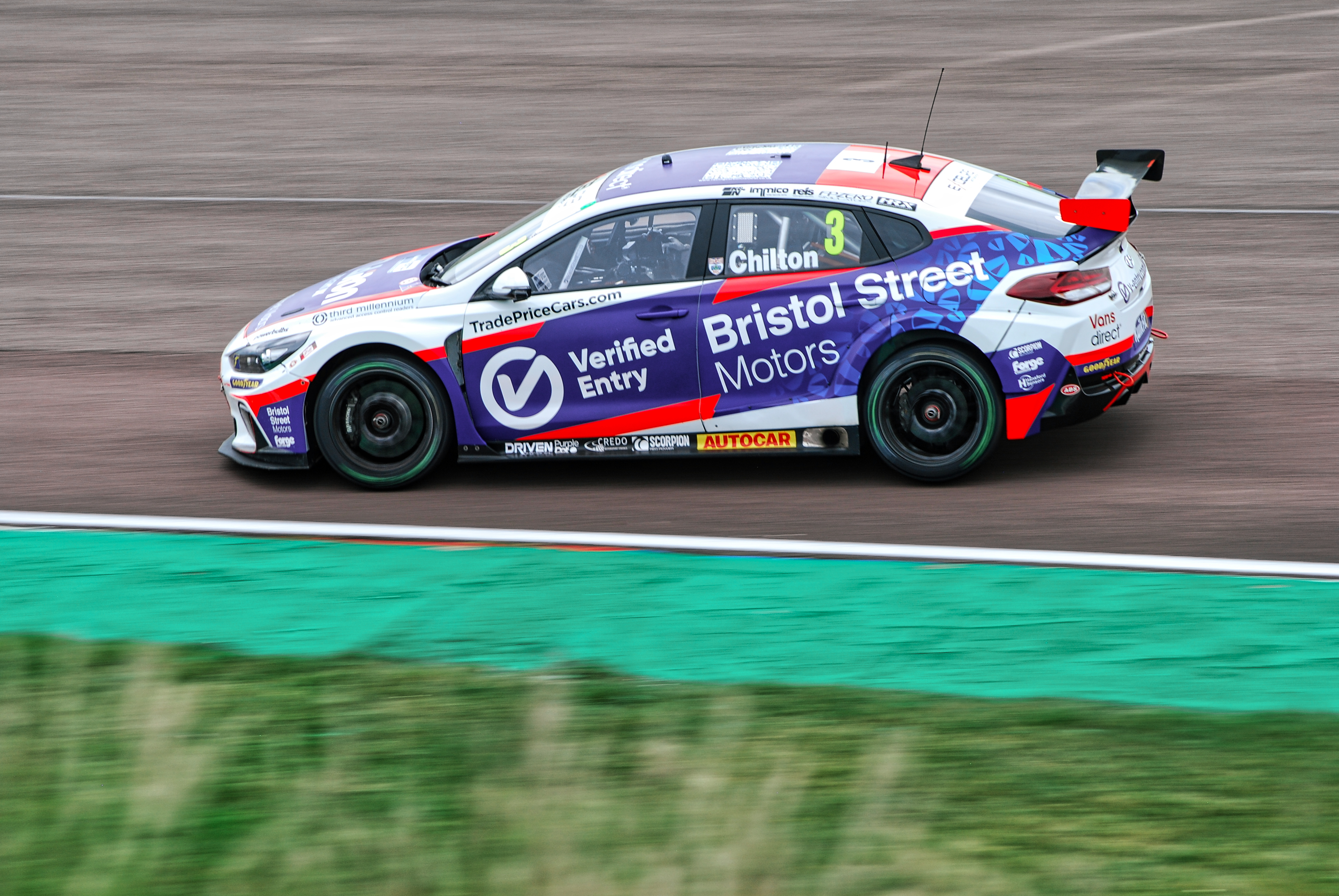
Chilton driving at Thruxton during the 2022 British Touring Car Championship.

For 2026, Chilton once again drove for Team VERTU in the British Touring Car Championship. He retired from professional racing after the season.

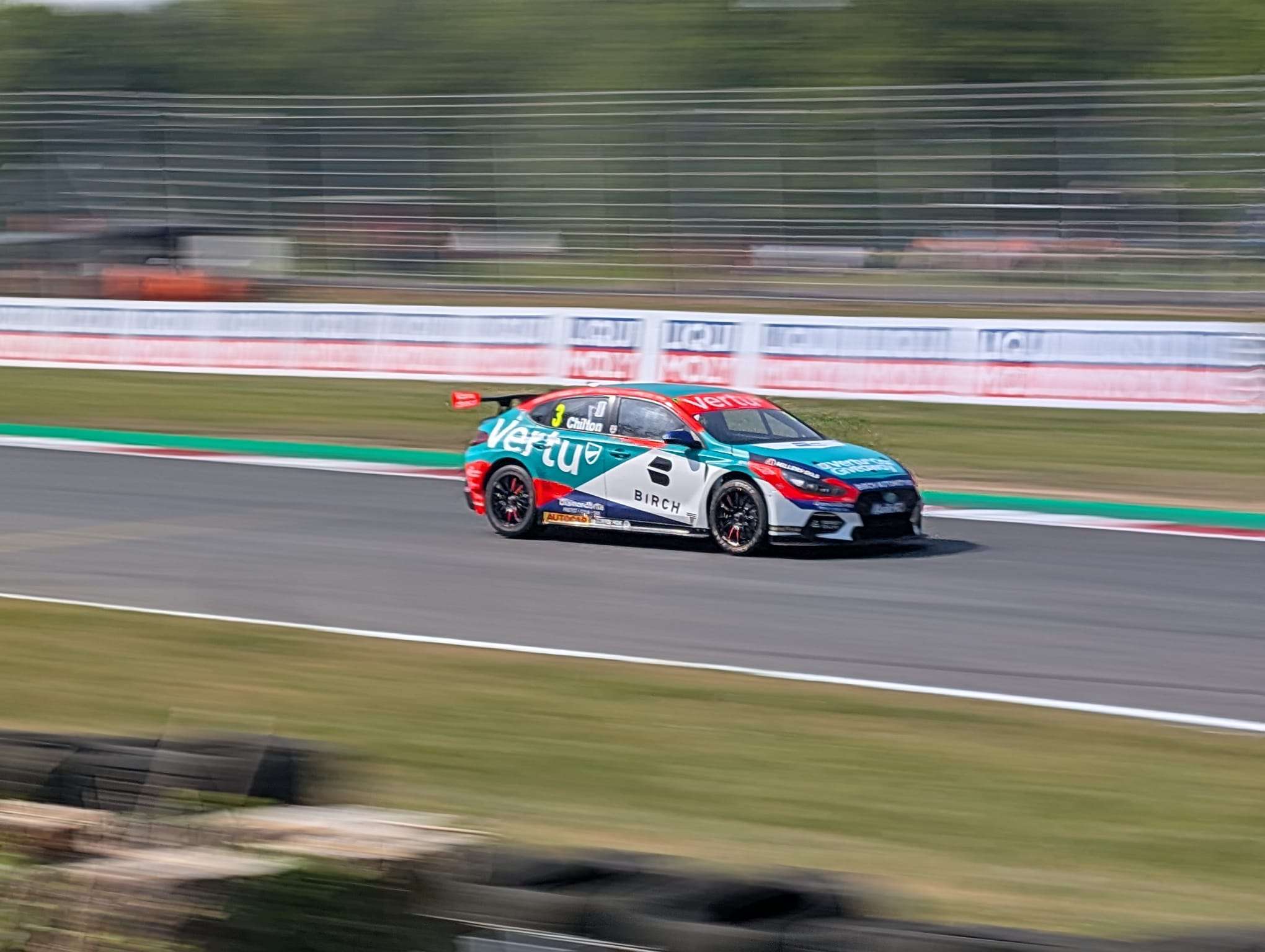
Chilton driving an EXCELR8 Motorsport Hyundai i30 at Brands Hatch in 2026.

== TV appearances ==
Chilton has appeared in five episodes of Top Gear. In Series 5, Episode 5, he was one of the drivers in the People Carrier Race. He then again appeared in the first episode of series 6 as one of the drivers in the Toyota Aygo football match. More recently, he has appeared in Series 10 episode 6 when he raced a Chevrolet motorhome with other touring car drivers as well as Richard Hammond. In Series 12 episode 5, he raced (and then rolled over) a Leyland Olympian, and had earlier on in the episode raced against Jeremy Clarkson whilst driving a BMW M3. On 6 December 2009, he appeared in a further episode of Top Gear, racing against other touring car drivers in airport vehicles. In Series 20, episode 2, he raced a taxi cab against Hammond.

In 2009, Chilton appeared with Anthony Reid in a music video for singer-songwriter Andy J Gallagher.

Chilton appeared as a single man in Episode 4 of the first series of the ITV show Take Me Out hosted by Paddy McGuinness.

Chilton also appeared in Fifth Gear.

== Racing record ==
=== Racing career summary ===
Season	Series	Team	Races	Wins	Poles	F/Laps	Podiums	Points	Position
2000	T Cars	?	?	?	?	?	?	?	**3rd**
2001	T Cars	?	?	?	?	?	?	?	**3rd**
2002	British Touring Car Championship	Barwell Motorsport	20	0	0	0	1	14	15th
2003	British Touring Car Championship	Honda Racing	17	0	0	0	1	70	9th
2004	British Touring Car Championship	Team Honda	30	2	0	0	5	116	9th
2005	British Touring Car Championship	Arena Motorsport	24	4	2	2	9	175	5th
2005	American Le Mans Series - LMP1	Zytek Motorsport	3	1	1	0	1	33	8th
2005	Le Mans Endurance Series	Zytek Motorsport	4	1	0	0	1	22	6th
2006	British Touring Car Championship	VX Racing	30	0	1	2	5	139	7th
2007	British Touring Car Championship	VX Racing	30	0	1	3	6	130	9th
2007	Le Mans Series - LMP1	Arena Motorsport	2	0	0	0	0	7	12th
2007	American Le Mans Series - LMP1	Arena International Motorsport	2	0	0	0	0	25	16th
2007	24 Hours of Le Mans - LMP1	Arena Motorsports International	0	0	0	0	0	N/A	DNS
2008	British Touring Car Championship	Team Halfords	30	1	0	0	4	107	10th
2009	British Touring Car Championship	Team Aon	29	0	1	0	3	55	13th
2010	British Touring Car Championship	Team Aon	30	3	4	3	7	191	5th
2011	British Touring Car Championship	Team Aon	30	2	1	1	3	135	7th
2012	World Touring Car Championship	Team Aon	24	0	0	0	0	7	22nd
2013	World Touring Car Championship	RML	24	2	1	3	6	213	5th
2014	World Touring Car Championship	ROAL Motorsport	23	1	1	1	2	150	8th
2015	World Touring Car Championship	ROAL Motorsport	22	0	0	0	1	96	11th
2015	24 Hours of Nürburgring - SP4T	Rotek Racing GmbH	1	0	1	0	0	N/A	DNF
2016	World Touring Car Championship	Sébastien Loeb Racing	22	1	0	1	6	163	8th
2017	World Touring Car Championship	Sébastien Loeb Racing	20	3	0	2	6	248.5	**3rd**
2017	British Touring Car Championship	Power Maxed Racing	27	0	0	1	1	100	15th
2018	British Touring Car Championship	Team Shredded Wheat Racing with Gallagher	30	1	0	3	6	266	**3rd**
2019	British Touring Car Championship	Team Shredded Wheat Racing with Gallagher	30	1	0	0	5	200	10th
2020	British Touring Car Championship	BTC Racing	27	0	0	0	3	184	10th
2021	British Touring Car Championship	Car Gods with Ciceley Motorsport	30	0	0	1	0	64	19th
2022	British Touring Car Championship	Bristol Street Motors with Excelr8 TradePriceCars.com	28	0	0	1	0	83	15th
2023	British Touring Car Championship	Bristol Street Motors with EXCELR8	30	1	0	0	1	97	14th
2024	British Touring Car Championship	Team Bristol Street Motors	29	1	0	0	3	187	10th
2025	British Touring Car Championship	Team VERTU	30	2	1	3	6	230	7th
2026	British Touring Car Championship	Team VERTU	30	1	0	0	4	195	13th

=== Complete British Touring Car Championship results ===
(key) Races in bold indicate pole position (1 point awarded – 2002 all races, 2003–present just in first race) Races in italics indicate fastest lap (1 point awarded all races) * signifies that driver lead race for at least one lap (1 point given – 2002 just in feature race, 2003–present all races; ^{Superscript} number indicates points-scoring qualifying race position)

Year	Team	Car	Class	1	2	3	4	5	6	7	8	9	10	11	12	13	14	15	16	17	18	19	20	21	22	23	24	25	26	27	28	29	30	Pen.	Pos	Points
2002	Barwell Motorsport	Vauxhall Astra Coupé	T	BRH; 1; 3	BRH; 2 Ret	OUL; 1; 11	OUL; 2; 9	THR; 1; 13	THR; 2 Ret	SIL; 1; 11	SIL; 2 Ret	MON; 1; 9	MON; 2 Ret	CRO; 1 Ret	CRO; 2 Ret	SNE; 1 Ret	SNE; 2; 8*	KNO; 1; 10	KNO; 2; 7	BRH; 1; 12	BRH; 2; 10	DON; 1; 12	DON; 2 Ret											−10	15th	14
2003	Honda Racing	Honda Civic Type-R	T	MON; 1 Ret	MON; 2; 3	BRH; 1 DNS	BRH; 2 DNS	THR; 1; 7	THR; 2; 10	SIL; 1; 5	SIL; 2; 6	ROC; 1; 4	ROC; 2; 7	CRO; 1; 7	CRO; 2; 12	SNE; 1; 6	SNE; 2; 5	BRH; 1; 8	BRH; 2; 7	DON; 1; 7	DON; 2; 6	OUL; 1 Ret	OUL; 2 DNS												9th	70
2004	Team Honda	Honda Civic Type-R		THR; 1; 10	**THR**; **2** Ret	THR; 3; 10	BRH; 1; 3	BRH; 2; 6	BRH; 3; 6	SIL; 1; 18	SIL; 2; 10	SIL; 3; 1*	OUL; 1; 11	OUL; 2; 7	OUL; 3; 6	MON; 1; 7	MON; 2; 8	MON; 3; 5	CRO; 1; 19	CRO; 2; 9	CRO; 3; 7	KNO; 1; 2	KNO; 2 Ret	KNO; 3 Ret	BRH; 1; 6	BRH; 2; 13	BRH; 3; 8	SNE; 1; 3	SNE; 2; 10	SNE; 3; 12	DON; 1; 9	DON; 2; 1*	**DON**; **3**; 12		9th	116
2005	Arena Motorsport	Honda Civic Type-R		DON; 1	DON; 2	DON; 3	**THR**; **1**; 10*	THR; 2; 6	THR; 3 Ret	BRH; 1; 7	BRH; 2 NC	BRH; 3; 7	OUL; 1; 5	OUL; 2; 5	OUL; 3; 1*	CRO; 1; 6	CRO; 2; 3	CRO; 3; 9	MON; 1; 9	MON; 2; 8*	MON; 3; 2*	**SNE**; **1**; 1*	**SNE**; **2**; 1*	SNE; 3; 7	KNO; 1; 5	KNO; 2; 3	KNO; 3; 3	SIL; 1; 1*	**SIL**; **2**; 8*	SIL; 3; 3	BRH; 1	BRH; 2	BRH; 3		5th	175
2006	VX Racing	Vauxhall Astra Sport Hatch		**BRH**; **1**; 2*	BRH; 2; 7	**BRH**; **3**; 3*	MON; 1; 6	MON; 2 Ret	MON; 3; 9	OUL; 1; 9	OUL; 2; 7	**OUL**; **3**; 3*	THR; 1; 4	THR; 2; 9	THR; 3; 8	CRO; 1 Ret	CRO; 2; 8	CRO; 3; 6	DON; 1; 5	DON; 2 Ret	DON; 3; 6	SNE; 1 Ret	SNE; 2; 7	SNE; 3; 3*	KNO; 1; 12	KNO; 2 Ret	KNO; 3 Ret	BRH; 1; 4	BRH; 2; 6	**BRH**; **3**; 8*	SIL; 1; 3	SIL; 2 Ret	SIL; 3; 3		7th	139
2007	VX Racing	Vauxhall Vectra		BRH; 1; 6	BRH; 2; 3	BRH; 3; 7	ROC; 1; 2	ROC; 2; 3	ROC; 3; 4	THR; 1; 6	THR; 2; 3	THR; 3; 8	CRO; 1; 8	CRO; 2 Ret	CRO; 3; 7	OUL; 1; 6	OUL; 2; 9	OUL; 3; 6	DON; 1; 15	DON; 2; 12	DON; 3; 7	SNE; 1; 3	SNE; 2; 8	SNE; 3; 8	BRH; 1; 6	BRH; 2 Ret	BRH; 3; 9	KNO; 1 Ret	KNO; 2; 11	KNO; 3 Ret	**THR**; **1** Ret*	THR; 2; 9	THR; 3; 3		9th	130
2008	Team Halfords	Honda Civic		BRH; 1; 9	BRH; 2 Ret	BRH; 3; 7	ROC; 1; 8	ROC; 2; 7	ROC; 3; 2	DON; 1 Ret	DON; 2; 5	DON; 3; 5	THR; 1; 7	THR; 2; 12	THR; 3 Ret	CRO; 1 Ret	CRO; 2; 14	CRO; 3; 4	SNE; 1; 3	SNE; 2; 15	SNE; 3; 7	OUL; 1; 2	OUL; 2; 11	OUL; 3 Ret	KNO; 1; 10	KNO; 2; 11	KNO; 3; 6	SIL; 1; 12	SIL; 2 Ret	SIL; 3; 9	BRH; 1; 8	BRH; 2; 6	BRH; 3; 1*		10th	107
2009	Team Aon	Ford Focus ST		BRH; 1; 11	BRH; 2; 14	BRH; 3; 11	THR; 1; 15	THR; 2; 17	THR; 3 Ret	DON; 1; 12	DON; 2; 17	DON; 3; 9	OUL; 1; 13	OUL; 2; 12	OUL; 3 Ret	CRO; 1 Ret	CRO; 2 DNS	CRO; 3; 10	SNE; 1; 11	SNE; 2 Ret	SNE; 3 Ret	KNO; 1; 11	KNO; 2; 11	KNO; 3; 8	SIL; 1; 11	SIL; 2; 5	SIL; 3 Ret	ROC; 1; 18	ROC; 2; 9	**ROC**; **3**; 3*	**BRH**; **1**; 2*	BRH; 2; 6*	BRH; 3; 3		13th	55
2010	Team Aon	Ford Focus ST LPG		THR; 1 Ret	THR; 2 Ret	THR; 3; 8	**ROC**; **1**; 11	ROC; 2; 6	ROC; 3 Ret	**BRH**; **1**; 1*	**BRH**; **2** DSQ	BRH; 3; 6	OUL; 1; 5	OUL; 2; 6	OUL; 3; 4	**CRO**; **1**; 18	CRO; 2; 11	CRO; 3; 4	SNE; 1; 3	SNE; 2; 2	SNE; 3; 4	SIL; 1; 1*	**SIL**; **2**; 1*	SIL; 3; 6	KNO; 1; 5	KNO; 2; 4	KNO; 3; 10	**DON**; **1**; 2	DON; 2; 4	DON; 3; 5	BRH; 1; 7	BRH; 2; 5	BRH; 3; 3		5th	191
2011	Team Aon	Ford Focus		BRH; 1; 3	BRH; 2; 8	BRH; 3; 8	DON; 1; 4	DON; 2; 4	DON; 3 Ret	THR; 1; 4	THR; 2; 4	THR; 3 Ret	OUL; 1; 17	OUL; 2; 10	OUL; 3; 7	CRO; 1; 7	CRO; 2; 6	CRO; 3; 9	SNE; 1; 9	SNE; 2; 12	SNE; 3; 13	**KNO**; **1**; 1*	**KNO**; **2**; 4*	KNO; 3; 6	ROC; 1; 13	ROC; 2; 11	ROC; 3; 18	BRH; 1; 7	BRH; 2; 5	BRH; 3; 4	SIL; 1; 12	SIL; 2; 8	SIL; 3; 1*		7th	135
2017	Power Maxed Racing	Vauxhall Astra		BRH; 1; 10	BRH; 2; 8	**BRH**; **3**; 3	DON; 1 Ret	DON; 2; 10	DON; 3; 14	THR; 1; 14	THR; 2; 12	THR; 3; 10	OUL; 1; 19	OUL; 2; 24	OUL; 3; 19	CRO; 1; 9	CRO; 2 Ret	CRO; 3; 20	SNE; 1; 10	SNE; 2; 12	SNE; 3; 10	KNO; 1; 16	KNO; 2; 12	KNO; 3; 18	ROC; 1; 11	ROC; 2; 16	ROC; 3; 24	SIL; 1	SIL; 2	SIL; 3	BRH; 1; 5	BRH; 2; 7	BRH; 3; 15		15th	100
2018	Team Shredded Wheat Racing with Gallagher	Ford Focus RS		BRH; 1; 5	BRH; 2; 28	BRH; 3; 27	DON; 1; 29	DON; 2; 10	DON; 3; 9	THR; 1; 5	THR; 2; 9	THR; 3; 11	OUL; 1; 2	OUL; 2; 3*	OUL; 3; 7	CRO; 1; 15	CRO; 2; 6	CRO; 3; 2	SNE; 1; 13	SNE; 2; 11	SNE; 3; 5	ROC; 1; 3	ROC; 2; 10	**ROC**; **3** Ret	KNO; 1; 12	KNO; 2; 6	**KNO**; **3**; 1*	SIL; 1; 2	SIL; 2; 13	SIL; 3; 6	BRH; 1; 9	BRH; 2; 6	BRH; 3; 4		3rd	266
2019	Team Shredded Wheat Racing with Gallagher	Ford Focus RS		BRH; 1; 3	BRH; 2; 9	BRH; 3; 2*	DON; 1; 8	DON; 2; 4	DON; 3; 12	THR; 1; 18	THR; 2; 25	THR; 3; 13	CRO; 1; 3	CRO; 2; 9	**CRO**; **3**; 1*	OUL; 1; 12	OUL; 2 Ret	OUL; 3; 12	SNE; 1 Ret	SNE; 2; 17	SNE; 3; 12	THR; 1; 22	THR; 2; 12	THR; 3; 22	KNO; 1; 7	KNO; 2; 5	KNO; 3; 7	SIL; 1; 9	SIL; 2; 20	SIL; 3; 5	BRH; 1; 3	BRH; 2; 5	BRH; 3 Ret		10th	200
2020	BTC Racing	Honda Civic Type R (FK8)		DON; 1; 10	DON; 2; 13	DON; 3; 12	BRH; 1; 5	BRH; 2 Ret	BRH; 3; 8	OUL; 1; 5	OUL; 2; 8	OUL; 3; 5	KNO; 1; 11	KNO; 2; 7	KNO; 3; 3	THR; 1; 7	THR; 2; 7	THR; 3; 2	SIL; 1; 15	SIL; 2; 11	SIL; 3; 9	CRO; 1; 6	CRO; 2; 6	**CRO**; **3**; 3	SNE; 1; 16	SNE; 2; 16	SNE; 3; 17	BRH; 1; 12	BRH; 2; 18*	BRH; 3; 11					10th	184
2021	Car Gods with Ciceley Motorsport	BMW 330i M Sport		THR; 1; 14	THR; 2 Ret	THR; 3; 13	SNE; 1; 21	SNE; 2 Ret	SNE; 3; 19	BRH; 1; 19	BRH; 2; 13	BRH; 3; 18	OUL; 1; 17	OUL; 2; 13	OUL; 3; 9	KNO; 1; 12	KNO; 2; 25	KNO; 3; 23	THR; 1; 14	THR; 2; 17	THR; 3; 17	CRO; 1; 11	CRO; 2; 17	CRO; 3; 10	SIL; 1; 20	SIL; 2; 13	SIL; 3; 28	DON; 1; 19	DON; 2; 20	DON; 3; 18	BRH; 1; 9	BRH; 2; 8	BRH; 3; 6		19th	64
2022	Bristol Street Motors with Excelr8 TradePriceCars.com	Hyundai i30 Fastback N Performance		DON; 1; 10	DON; 2; 22	DON; 3 Ret	BRH; 1; 13	BRH; 2; 12	**BRH**; **3** Ret*	THR; 1; 12	THR; 2; 15	THR; 3; 11	OUL; 1 Ret	OUL; 2 Ret	OUL; 3; 20	CRO; 1; 10	CRO; 2; 9	CRO; 3; 9	KNO; 1; 11	KNO; 2; 10	KNO; 3; 9	SNE; 1 Ret	SNE; 2 DNS	SNE; 3 DNS	THR; 1; 28	THR; 2; 22	THR; 3; 16	SIL; 1; 10	SIL; 2; 12	SIL; 3; 7	BRH; 1; 16	BRH; 2; 14	BRH; 3; 18		15th	83
2023	Bristol Street Motors with EXCELR8	Hyundai i30 Fastback N Performance		DON; 1; 15	DON; 2; 1*	DON; 3; 8	BRH; 1; 15	BRH; 2; 12	BRH; 3; 7	SNE; 1; 24	SNE; 2; 15	SNE; 3; 11	THR; 1; 12	THR; 2; 13	THR; 3; 25	OUL; 1; 12	OUL; 2; 11	OUL; 3; 12	CRO; 1; 15	CRO; 2; 10	CRO; 3 Ret	KNO; 1 DSQ	KNO; 2; 16	KNO; 3; 20	DON; 1; 10	DON; 2; 11	DON; 3; 12	SIL; 1; 13	SIL; 2; 16	SIL; 3 Ret	BRH; 1; 13	BRH; 2; 12	BRH; 3 Ret	–5	14th	97
2024	Team Bristol Street Motors	Hyundai i30 Fastback N Performance		DON; 1; 11	DON; 2 Ret	DON; 3; 11	BRH; 1; 6	BRH; 2; 6	BRH; 3; 2	SNE; 1; 15	SNE; 2; 5	SNE; 3; 6	THR; 1; 6	THR; 2; 11	THR; 3 Ret	OUL; 1; 6	OUL; 2 Ret	OUL; 3 DNS	CRO; 1; 9	CRO; 2; 8	**CRO**; **3**; 1*	KNO; 1; 14	KNO; 2; 9	KNO; 3; 3	DON; 1; 16	DON; 2; 12	DON; 3; 16	SIL; 1; 7	SIL; 2 Ret	SIL; 3; 12	BRH; 1; 9	BRH; 2; 9	BRH; 3; 14		10th	187
2025	Team VERTU	Hyundai i30 Fastback N Performance		DON; 1; 7	DON; 2; 6	**DON**; **3**; 1*	BRH; 1; 22	BRH; 2; 12	BRH; 3; 7	SNE; 1; 7	SNE; 2; 3	SNE; 3; 18	THR; 1; 15	THR; 2 Ret	THR; 3; 8	OUL; 1; 5	OUL; 2; 3	OUL; 3 Ret	CRO; 1; 5	CRO; 2; 2	CRO; 3; 8	KNO; 1 DSQ	KNO; 2; 8	KNO; 3; 5	**DON**; **1**; 1*	**DON**; **2**; 15*	DON; 3; 6	SIL; 1; 20	SIL; 2 Ret	SIL; 3; 8	BRH; 1; 2	BRH; 2 Ret*	BRH; 3 Ret		7th	230
2026	Team VERTU	Hyundai i30 Fastback N Performance		DON; 1; 9^{6}	DON; 2; 13	DON; 3 Ret	BRH; 1; 5^{14}	BRH; 2 Ret	BRH; 3; 12	SNE; 1; 7^{8}	SNE; 2; 3	SNE; 3; 7	OUL; 1; 8^{11}	OUL; 2; 17	OUL; 3 Ret	THR; 1; 13	THR; 2; 12	THR; 3; 8	KNO; 1; 17^{12}	KNO; 2; 12	**KNO**; **3**; 1*	DON; 1; 20	DON; 2; 14	DON; 3; 17	CRO; 1; 11^{13}	CRO; 2; 8	CRO; 3; 2	SIL; 1; 3^{3}	SIL; 2; 11	SIL; 3; 6	BRH; 1; 14^{15}	BRH; 2; 12	BRH; 3 Ret		13th	195

=== Complete World Touring Car Championship results ===
(key) (Races in bold indicate pole position) (Races in italics indicate fastest lap)

Year	Team	Car	1	2	3	4	5	6	7	8	9	10	11	12	13	14	15	16	17	18	19	20	21	22	23	24	Pos	Points
2012	Team Aon	Ford Focus S2000 TC	ITA; 1; 13	ITA; 2; 16	ESP; 1; 19	ESP; 2; 15	MAR; 1; 7	MAR; 2; 16†	SVK; 1 Ret	SVK; 2; 10	HUN; 1; 15	HUN; 2; 14	AUT; 1; 16	AUT; 2; 11	POR; 1; 16	POR; 2; 15	BRA; 1; 16	BRA; 2; 16†	USA; 1; 12	USA; 2; 15	JPN; 1; 15	JPN; 2; 18	CHN; 1; 11	CHN; 2; 19	MAC; 1; 13	MAC; 2 Ret	22nd	7
2013	RML	Chevrolet Cruze 1.6T	ITA; 1; 2	ITA; 2; 5	MAR; 1 Ret	MAR; 2; 3	SVK; 1 Ret	SVK; 2; 7	HUN; 1; 7	HUN; 2; 7	AUT; 1; 7	AUT; 2 NC	RUS; 1; 9	RUS; 2; 6	POR; 1; 2	POR; 2; 9	ARG; 1; 3	ARG; 2; 12	**USA**; **1**; 1	USA; 2; 11	JPN; 1; 4	JPN; 2; 6	CHN; 1; 1	CHN; 2; 10	MAC; 1 Ret	MAC; 2 Ret	5th	213
2014	ROAL Motorsport	Chevrolet RML Cruze TC1	MAR; 1; 4	MAR; 2; 4	FRA; 1; 9	FRA; 2; 15	HUN; 1; 14	HUN; 2; 7	SVK; 1; 5	SVK; 2 C	AUT; 1; 6	AUT; 2 Ret	RUS; 1; 5	RUS; 2; 6	BEL; 1; 10	BEL; 2; 10	ARG; 1; 6	ARG; 2 Ret	**BEI**; **1**; 1	BEI; 2; 8	CHN; 1 Ret	CHN; 2; 7	JPN; 1; 2	JPN; 2; 10	MAC; 1; 12	MAC; 2; 7	8th	150
2015	ROAL Motorsport	Chevrolet RML Cruze TC1	ARG; 1; 8	ARG; 2; 8	MAR; 1; 14	MAR; 2; 4	HUN; 1; 7	HUN; 2; 3	GER; 1; 9	GER; 2 DNS	RUS; 1; 6	RUS; 2; 9	SVK; 1; 7	SVK; 2 Ret	FRA; 1; 5	FRA; 2; 8	POR; 1; 14	POR; 2; 13	JPN; 1 Ret	JPN; 2; 6	CHN; 1 Ret	CHN; 2 DNS	THA; 1 Ret	THA; 2; 4	QAT; 1; 13	QAT; 2; 13	11th	96
2016	Sébastien Loeb Racing	Citroën C-Elysée WTCC	FRA; 1; 11	FRA; 2; 9	SVK; 1; 9	SVK; 2; 7	HUN; 1; 2	HUN; 2; 5	MAR; 1; 5	MAR; 2 DSQ	GER; 1; 2	GER; 2; 3	RUS; 1; 14	RUS; 2; 16	POR; 1; 2	POR; 2; 10	ARG; 1; 1	ARG; 2; 9	JPN; 1; 8	JPN; 2; 6	CHN; 1 Ret	CHN; 2; 9	**QAT**; **1**; 2	QAT; 2 Ret			8th	163
2017	Sébastien Loeb Racing	Citroën C-Elysée WTCC	MAR; 1; 7	MAR; 2; 5	ITA; 1; 1	ITA; 2 Ret	HUN; 1; 2	HUN; 2; 3	GER; 1; 4	GER; 2; 5	POR; 1; 4	POR; 2; 6	ARG; 1; 4	ARG; 2; 7	CHN; 1 Ret	CHN; 2; 3‡	JPN; 1; 1	JPN; 2; 10	MAC; 1; 8	MAC; 2; 3	QAT; 1; 1	QAT; 2; 5					3rd	248.5

^{†} Did not finish the race, but was classified as he completed over 90% of the race distance. ^{‡} Half points awarded as less than 75% of race distance was completed.

=== Complete Le Mans Series results ===
(key) (Races in bold indicate pole position; races in italics indicate fastest lap)

Year	Entrant	Class	Car	Engine	1	2	3	4	5	6	Pos.	Points
2005	Zytek Motorsport	LMP1	Zytek 04S	Zytek ZG348 3.4L V8	SPA	MNZ; 6	SIL; 8	**NÜR**; 1	IST; 4		6th	22
2007	Arena Motorsports International	LMP1	Zytek 07S	Zytek 2ZG408 4.0L V8	MNZ	VAL	NÜR; 6	SPA	SIL; 5	INT	16th	7

Sporting positions
Preceded by Mehdi Bennani	World Touring Car Championship; Independents' Trophy winner 2017	Succeeded by None (Series ended)
