= 2013 World Touring Car Championship =

Motorsport contest

Champions
- World Drivers' Champion: Yvan Muller
- World Manufacturers' Champion: Honda

Seasons
- ← 2012 2014 →

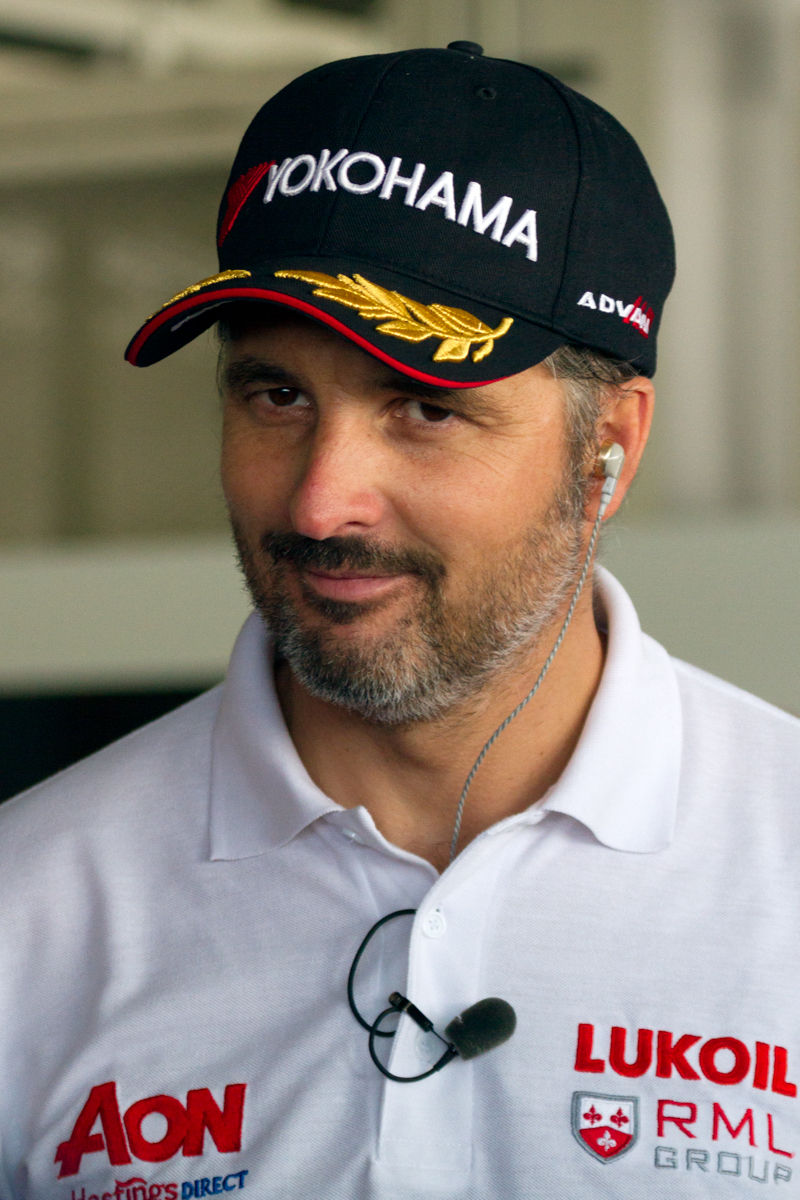
Yvan Muller won the 2013 Drivers' Championship, his fourth series title.

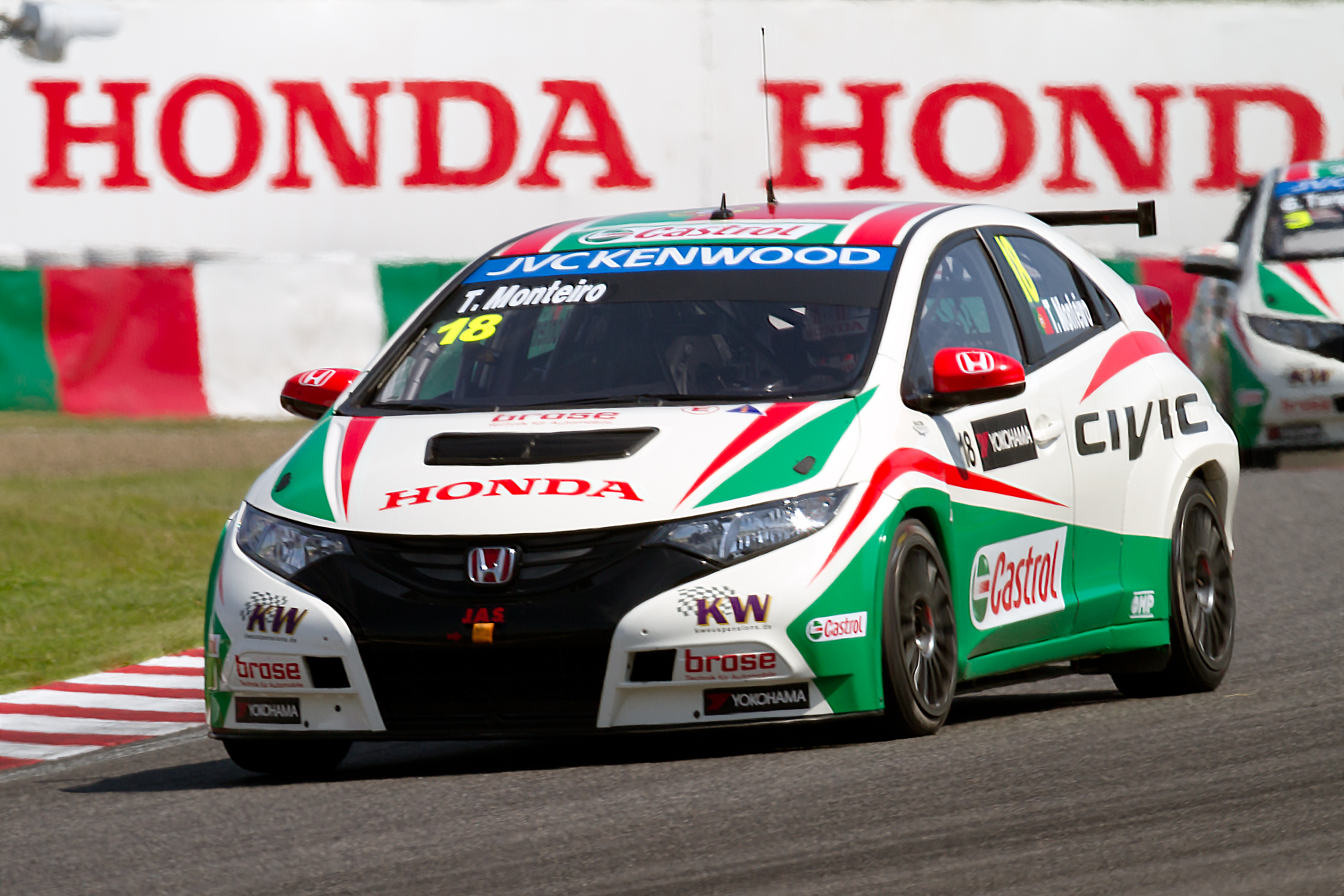
Honda won the 2013 Manufacturers' Championship.

The 2013 World Touring Car Championship season was the tenth season of the FIA World Touring Car Championship, and the ninth since the series was revived in 2005. The championship, which was reserved for cars run to Super 2000 regulations, began with the Race of Italy on 23 March and concluded with the Race of Macau in support of the Macau Grand Prix at the Guia Circuit on 17 November, after twenty-four races at twelve events.

Yvan Muller secured the Drivers' Championship title in Japan, with two events remaining in the season. Honda won the Manufacturers' Championship. Chevrolet was the defending manufacturers' champion, but it did not support a team in 2013, and thus was unable to defend its title.

James Nash won the Yokohama Drivers' Trophy for independent entries and RML won the Yokohama Teams' Trophy. The Lukoil Racing Team was the defending Yokohama Teams' Trophy winner, but was unable to defend its title as Lukoil closed their own team to support manufacturer Lada Sport team in 2013.

== Teams and drivers ==
Team	Car	No.	Drivers	Rounds
Manufacturer Teams
(Japan) Castrol Honda World Touring Car Team	Honda Civic WTCC	3	(Italy) Gabriele Tarquini	All
(Japan) Castrol Honda World Touring Car Team	Honda Civic WTCC	18	(Portugal) Tiago Monteiro	All
(Russia) Lada Sport Lukoil	Lada Granta WTCC	8	(Russia) Mikhail Kozlovskiy	2–12
(Russia) Lada Sport Lukoil	Lada Granta WTCC	10	(United Kingdom) James Thompson	All
(Russia) Lada Sport Lukoil	Lada Granta WTCC	11	(Russia) Aleksey Dudukalo	1
Independent Teams
(Germany) ALL-INKL.COM Münnich Motorsport	SEAT León WTCC	1	(United Kingdom) Robert Huff	All
(Germany) ALL-INKL.COM Münnich Motorsport	SEAT León WTCC	38	(Germany) Marc Basseng	All
(Hungary) Zengő Motorsport	Honda Civic WTCC	5	(Hungary) Norbert Michelisz	All
(United Kingdom) RML	Chevrolet Cruze 1.6T	12	(France) Yvan Muller	All
(United Kingdom) RML	Chevrolet Cruze 1.6T	23	(United Kingdom) Tom Chilton	All
(Italy) ROAL Motorsport	BMW 320 TC	15	(Netherlands) Tom Coronel	All
(Sweden) NIKA Racing	Chevrolet Cruze 1.6T	69	(Sweden) Rickard Rydell	11
(Spain) Tuenti Racing Team	SEAT León WTCC	74	(Spain) Pepe Oriola	1–6
(Spain) Tuenti Racing Team	Chevrolet Cruze 1.6T	74	(Spain) Pepe Oriola	7–12
Yokohama Trophy
(Germany) Liqui Moly Team Engstler	BMW 320 TC	6	(Germany) Franz Engstler	1–9, 11–12
(Germany) Liqui Moly Team Engstler	BMW 320 TC	7	(Hong Kong) Charles Ng	All
(Hong Kong) bamboo-engineering	Chevrolet Cruze 1.6T	9	(United Kingdom) Alex MacDowall	All
(Hong Kong) bamboo-engineering	Chevrolet Cruze 1.6T	14	(United Kingdom) James Nash	All
(France) ANOME	BMW 320 TC	13	(France) Jean-Philippe Dayraut	1
(Sweden) NIKA Racing	Chevrolet Cruze 1.6T	17	(Denmark) Michel Nykjær	1–9
(Spain) Campos Racing	SEAT León WTCC	19	(Spain) Fernando Monje	1–11
(Spain) Campos Racing	SEAT León WTCC	20	(France) Hugo Valente	4–5, 7–9, 11–12
(Spain) Campos Racing	SEAT León WTCC	21	(Russia) Nikolay Karamyshev	6–7
(Spain) Campos Racing	SEAT León WTCC	81	(Latvia) Konstantīns Calko	12
(United Kingdom) Special Tuning Racing	SEAT León WTCC	22	(United Kingdom) Tom Boardman	1–4, 7, 9–12
(Italy) Proteam Racing	BMW 320 TC	25	(Morocco) Mehdi Bennani	All
(Italy) PB Racing	BMW 320 TC	26	(Italy) Stefano D'Aste	All
(Germany) ALL-INKL.COM Münnich Motorsport	SEAT León WTCC	37	(Germany) René Münnich	All
(Italy) ROAL Motorsport	BMW 320 TC	55	(Hong Kong) Darryl O'Young	All
(Germany) Wiechers-Sport	BMW 320 TC	72	(Argentina) José María López	8
(Germany) Wiechers-Sport	BMW 320 TC	73	(Switzerland) Fredy Barth	1–7, 9, 11–12
Eurosport Asian Trophy
China Dragon Racing	Chevrolet Cruze LT	60	(Macau) Felipe De Souza	10–12
China Dragon Racing	Chevrolet Cruze LT	61	(Macau) Kin Veng Ng	10–12
China Dragon Racing	Chevrolet Lacetti	62	(Macau) Lam Kam San	12
China Dragon Racing	Chevrolet Lacetti	63	(Macau) Célio Alves Dias	12
(Macau) Son Veng Racing Team	Chevrolet Cruze LT	66	(Macau) Jerónimo Badaraco	10–12
(Sweden) NIKA Racing	Chevrolet Cruze 1.6T	67	(Japan) Hiroki Yoshimoto	10
(Sweden) NIKA Racing	Chevrolet Cruze 1.6T	33	(Japan) Yukinori Taniguchi	12
(Germany) Wiechers-Sport	BMW 320 TC	33	(Japan) Yukinori Taniguchi	10
(Spain) Campos Racing	SEAT León WTCC	33	(Japan) Yukinori Taniguchi	11
(Spain) Campos Racing	SEAT León WTCC	80	(Hong Kong) Michael Soong	12
(Germany) Liqui Moly Team Engstler	BMW 320 TC	68	(Japan) Masaki Kano	10
(Germany) Liqui Moly Team Engstler	BMW 320si	70	(Macau) Jo Merszei	12
(Germany) Liqui Moly Team Engstler	BMW 320si	88	(Macau) Henry Ho	10–12
(Macau) RPM Racing	BMW 320si	77	(Macau) Mak Ka Lok	10–12
PAS Macau Racing Team	Honda Accord Euro R	79	(Macau) Eurico de Jesus	12
(Japan) Honda Racing Team JAS	Honda Civic WTCC	99	(Japan) Takuya Izawa	10
Guest Drivers
(Sweden) Volvo Polestar Racing	Volvo C30 DRIVe	40	(Sweden) Thed Björk	11

=== Team changes ===
- Arena Motorsport—who contested the 2012 season as Team Aon—did not compete in 2013 after its owner decided to shut down the team and concentrate its efforts on Formula One team Marussia F1.
- Former Formula One driver, team owner and GP2 Series team owner Adrián Campos entered the World Touring car Championship with two SEAT Leóns prepared by Sunred Engineering.
- Chevrolet announced that they withdrew from the series to concentrate on other projects. This leaves RML Group without the backing of a manufacturer.
- Stefano D'Aste established his own team, PB Motorsport.
- Honda entered the series in 2013 for the full season. JAS Motorsport entered two Honda Civic 1.6Ts on behalf of the manufacturer.
- After competing in FIA GT1 World Championship, Münnich Motorsport entered the World Touring Car Championship in 2013 with three SEAT León WTCC cars.
- After competing in two rounds in 2012, Russian car manufacturer Lada announced its intentions to contest races in 2013 with the Lada Granta WTCC, contesting a full season for the first time since 2009. On 15 November it was announced that the marque would enter a two car team for 2013. However, they later announced that they would enter a third car later of the season.
- NIKA Racing entered the series for the full season with a Chevrolet Cruze 1.6T having previously entered two rounds of the championship since 2010.* Zengő Motorsport switched from entering a BMW 320 TC to the Honda Civic 1.6T for its 2013 campaign.

=== Driver changes ===
- Marc Basseng joined the series as a Münnich Motorsport driver, having won the 2012 FIA GT1 World Championship for the team.
- Tom Chilton moved to RML.
- Aleksei Dudukalo joined Lada for the 2013 season after two years with SEAT.
- Robert Huff switched to Münnich Motorsport to defend his championship title, replacing Markus Winkelhock in their lineup.
- Alain Menu left the series and moved into the Porsche Supercup.
- Tiago Monteiro joined Honda full-time for the 2013 season, having taken part in the final three races of 2012 season debuting the Honda entry.
- After a single entry during 2012, René Münnich will make his full-time World Touring Car Championship debut in 2013, racing for Münnich Motorsport.
- James Nash races for Bamboo Engineering in 2013 having raced for Team Aon in 2012.
- Darryl O'Young left Bamboo Engineering to join Tom Coronel at ROAL Motorsport in 2013.
- Gabriele Tarquini deserted Lukoil Racing Team, campaigning with the second Honda entry.

==== Mid-season changes ====
- Aleksei Dudukalo lost his seat with Lada Sport Lukoil after the Race of Italy. He was replaced by Russian Touring Car Championship driver Mikhail Kozlovskiy, with the team attributing the decision to replace Dudukalo as being a result of Dudukalo's collision with teammate James Thompson during qualifying for the race of Italy, forcing both Lada Granta WTCC cars out of the event.
- After the Moscow round, Pepe Oriola switched from his SEAT Leon to run an RML prepared Chevrolet Cruze.
- Michel Nykjær split with Nika Racing after the round in Sonoma. He was replaced by Hiroki Yoshimoto.

== Calendar ==
The 2013 championship was contested over twenty-four races, with two races held at each of twelve events throughout the year. The final calendar for the season was released in December 2012.

Rnd.	Race	Race Name	Circuit	Date
1	R1	Race of Italy	(Italy) Autodromo Nazionale di Monza	24 March
1	R2	Race of Italy	(Italy) Autodromo Nazionale di Monza	24 March
2	R3	Race of Morocco	(Morocco) Circuit International Automobile Moulay El Hassan	7 April
2	R4	Race of Morocco	(Morocco) Circuit International Automobile Moulay El Hassan	7 April
3	R5	Race of Slovakia	Automotodróm Slovakia Ring	28 April
3	R6	Race of Slovakia	Automotodróm Slovakia Ring	28 April
4	R7	Race of Hungary	(Hungary) Hungaroring	5 May
4	R8	Race of Hungary	(Hungary) Hungaroring	5 May
5	R9	Race of Austria	(Austria) Salzburgring	19 May
5	R10	Race of Austria	(Austria) Salzburgring	19 May
6	R11	Lukoil Race of Russia	(Russia) Moscow Raceway	9 June
6	R12	Lukoil Race of Russia	(Russia) Moscow Raceway	9 June
7	R13	Race of Portugal	(Portugal) Circuito da Boavista	30 June
7	R14	Race of Portugal	(Portugal) Circuito da Boavista	30 June
8	R15	Race of Argentina	(Argentina) Autódromo Termas de Río Hondo	4 August
8	R16	Race of Argentina	(Argentina) Autódromo Termas de Río Hondo	4 August
9	R17	Race of the United States	(United States) Sonoma Raceway	8 September
9	R18	Race of the United States	(United States) Sonoma Raceway	8 September
10	R19	JVC Kenwood Race of Japan	(Japan) Suzuka Circuit	22 September
10	R20	JVC Kenwood Race of Japan	(Japan) Suzuka Circuit	22 September
11	R21	Race of China	(China) Shanghai International Circuit	3 November
11	R22	Race of China	(China) Shanghai International Circuit	3 November
12	R23	Guia Race of Macau	(Macau) Guia Circuit	17 November
12	R24	Guia Race of Macau	(Macau) Guia Circuit	17 November

=== Calendar changes ===
- The Race of Morocco was not included on the provisional calendar for 2013, though the provisional calendar was released with a vacant race date.
- The Race of Portugal returned to the Circuito da Boavista in Porto after being held at the Portimão circuit in 2012.
- The Race of Spain was originally included on the provisional calendar at a venue to be decided. However, the race was removed from the final calendar released in December 2012.
- The Race of Russia made its championship debut at the Moscow Raceway.
- The Race of Brazil was dropped before the start of the season, but was later reinstated. It was then dropped from the calendar again when the Argentine round was confirmed.
- An additional thirteenth round of the championship was added before the start of the season. In May 2013, it was confirmed the Race of Argentina made its championship debut at the Autódromo Termas de Río Hondo. The race in Argentina was confirmed in June, replacing the Brazilian round.

== Results and standings ==
=== Races ===
Race	Race Name	Pole Position	Fastest lap	Winning driver	Winning team	Winning manufacturer	Yokohama winner	Report
1	Race of Italy	(France) Yvan Muller	(United Kingdom) Tom Chilton	(France) Yvan Muller	(United Kingdom) RML	(United States) Chevrolet	(United Kingdom) Alex MacDowall	Report
2	Race of Italy		(Spain) Pepe Oriola	(France) Yvan Muller	(United Kingdom) RML	(United States) Chevrolet	(Denmark) Michel Nykjær	Report
3	Race of Morocco	(Italy) Gabriele Tarquini	(United Kingdom) Alex MacDowall	(Denmark) Michel Nykjær	(Sweden) NIKA Racing	(United States) Chevrolet	(Denmark) Michel Nykjær	Report
4	Race of Morocco		(United Kingdom) Tom Chilton	(Spain) Pepe Oriola	(Spain) Tuenti Racing Team	(Spain) SEAT	(United Kingdom) James Nash	Report
5	Race of Slovakia	(Italy) Gabriele Tarquini	(Italy) Gabriele Tarquini	(Italy) Gabriele Tarquini	(Japan) Castrol Honda WTC Team	(Japan) Honda	(United Kingdom) James Nash	Report
6	Race of Slovakia		(Netherlands) Tom Coronel	(Netherlands) Tom Coronel	(Italy) ROAL Motorsport	(Germany) BMW	(United Kingdom) Alex MacDowall	Report
7	Race of Hungary	(France) Yvan Muller	(France) Yvan Muller	(France) Yvan Muller	(United Kingdom) RML	(United States) Chevrolet	(Morocco) Mehdi Bennani	Report
8	Race of Hungary		(United Kingdom) Robert Huff	(United Kingdom) Robert Huff	(Germany) Münnich Motorsport	(Spain) SEAT	(Morocco) Mehdi Bennani	Report
9	Race of Austria	(France) Yvan Muller (Note: Yvan Muller was one of twelve drivers given a grid penalty for unsporting behaviour during qualifying for the first race in Austria and started from thirteenth place. Michel Nykjær started the race from pole as a result, but Muller was entitled to keep the five championship points for pole position.)	(United Kingdom) Alex MacDowall	(Denmark) Michel Nykjær	(Sweden) NIKA Racing	(United States) Chevrolet	(Denmark) Michel Nykjær	Report
10	Race of Austria		(France) Yvan Muller	(United Kingdom) James Nash	(United Kingdom) bamboo-engineering	(United States) Chevrolet	(United Kingdom) James Nash	Report
11	Race of Russia	(France) Yvan Muller	(Netherlands) Tom Coronel	(France) Yvan Muller	(United Kingdom) RML	(United States) Chevrolet	(Denmark) Michel Nykjær	Report
12	Race of Russia		(Denmark) Michel Nykjær	(Denmark) Michel Nykjær	(Sweden) NIKA Racing	(United States) Chevrolet	(Denmark) Michel Nykjær	Report
13	Race of Portugal	(France) Yvan Muller	(Spain) Pepe Oriola	(France) Yvan Muller	(United Kingdom) RML	(United States) Chevrolet	(Denmark) Michel Nykjær	Report
14	Race of Portugal		(France) Yvan Muller	(United Kingdom) James Nash	(United Kingdom) bamboo-engineering	(United States) Chevrolet	(United Kingdom) James Nash	Report
15	Race of Argentina	(France) Yvan Muller	(France) Yvan Muller	(France) Yvan Muller	(United Kingdom) RML	(United States) Chevrolet	(Argentina) José María López	Report
16	Race of Argentina		(France) Yvan Muller	(Argentina) José María López	(Germany) Wiechers-Sport	(Germany) BMW	(Argentina) José María López	Report
17	Race of the United States	(United Kingdom) Tom Chilton	(Portugal) Tiago Monteiro	(United Kingdom) Tom Chilton	(United Kingdom) RML	(United States) Chevrolet	(United Kingdom) Alex MacDowall	Report
18	Race of the United States		(Hungary) Norbert Michelisz	(Italy) Gabriele Tarquini	(Japan) Castrol Honda WTC Team	(Japan) Honda	(Morocco) Mehdi Bennani	Report
19	Race of Japan	(Hungary) Norbert Michelisz	(Hungary) Norbert Michelisz	(Hungary) Norbert Michelisz	(Hungary) Zengő Motorsport	(Japan) Honda	(United Kingdom) Alex MacDowall	Report
20	Race of Japan		(Morocco) Mehdi Bennani	(Netherlands) Tom Coronel	(Italy) ROAL Motorsport	(Germany) BMW	(Morocco) Mehdi Bennani	Report
21	Race of China	(France) Yvan Muller	(Italy) Stefano D'Aste	(United Kingdom) Tom Chilton	(United Kingdom) RML	(United States) Chevrolet	(United Kingdom) James Nash	Report
22	Race of China		(Portugal) Tiago Monteiro	(Portugal) Tiago Monteiro	(Japan) Castrol Honda WTC Team	(Japan) Honda	(United Kingdom) James Nash	Report
23	Guia Race of Macau	(France) Yvan Muller	(France) Yvan Muller	(France) Yvan Muller	(United Kingdom) RML	(United States) Chevrolet	(United Kingdom) Alex MacDowall	Report
24	Guia Race of Macau		(France) Yvan Muller	(United Kingdom) Robert Huff	(Germany) Münnich Motorsport	(Spain) SEAT	(United Kingdom) James Nash	Report

=== Standings ===
==== Drivers' Championship ====
Pos.	Driver	ITA (Italy)		MAR (Morocco)		SVK (Slovakia)		HUN (Hungary)		AUT (Austria)		RUS (Russia)		POR (Portugal)		ARG (Argentina)		USA (United States)		JPN (Japan)		CHN (China)		MAC (Macau)		Pts.
1	(France) Yvan Muller	**1**^{1}	1	4^{3}	2	4^{4}	2	**1**^{1}	5	3^{1}	2	**1**^{1}	2	**1**^{1}	7	**1**^{1}	13	3^{2}	4	3^{4}	Ret	**2**^{1}	5	**1**^{1}	6	431
2	(Italy) Gabriele Tarquini	4^{5}	3	**2**^{1}	Ret	**1**^{1}	3	3^{3}	Ret	12	8	6^{5}	7	Ret^{5}	20	4^{4}	2	6	1	27†	4	7	2	DNS^{3}	8	242
3	(United Kingdom) James Nash	7	7	3^{2}	4	6	17	9	4	2	**1**	8	10	11	**1**	9	7	5	8	5^{5}	5	3^{4}	6	6	4	226
4	(United Kingdom) Robert Huff	6	10	5	Ret	17	4	4	1	8^{3}	9	4^{3}	3	5	2	8	Ret	8	20†	7	8	6	4	3^{4}	1	215
5	(United Kingdom) Tom Chilton	2^{2}	5	Ret^{5}	3	Ret^{5}	7	7	7	7^{2}	NC	9	6	2^{2}	9	3^{2}	12	**1**^{1}	11	4^{3}	6	1^{2}	10	Ret	Ret	213
6	(Hungary) Norbert Michelisz	8	22	Ret	15†	3^{3}	21	2^{2}	8	14	3	3^{4}	5	Ret^{4}	DNS	7^{3}	5	20	3	**1**^{1}	Ret	10	3	4^{5}	Ret	185
7	(Denmark) Michel Nykjær	20	2	1^{4}	7	7	12	10	9	**1**^{5}	5	7	1	3^{3}	3	6	4	12	17							180
8	(Portugal) Tiago Monteiro	5	8	Ret	DNS	2^{2}	5	Ret^{4}	13	13	4	12	12	9	11	10	6	2^{3}	5	28†	3	11	**1**	2^{2}	Ret	164
9	(Spain) Pepe Oriola	Ret^{4}	6	8	1	9	6	Ret	16	11	7	17	4	4	4	2^{5}	3	11^{4}	21†	26†	Ret	5^{3}	7	15	2	164
10	(Netherlands) Tom Coronel	9	11	9	6	5	**1**	6^{5}	6	10	10	2^{2}	14	7	8	NC	9	7	6	8	1	12	8	10	**3**	163
11	(United Kingdom) Alex MacDowall	3^{3}	20†	6	Ret	8	8	8	**3**	5^{4}	6	13	11	13	17	11	11	4^{5}	13	2^{2}	12	4^{5}	13	5	5	141
12	(Morocco) Mehdi Bennani	17	19	18	11	10	9	5	2	4	16	11	**16**	Ret	10	20	21†	18	**2**	11	**2**	16	14	11	Ret	80
13	(Germany) Marc Basseng	14	4	7	5	16	15	11	17	Ret	11	18	13	10	5	12	Ret	9	9	9	17	15	18	7	7	57
14	(United Kingdom) James Thompson	DNS	DNS	10	Ret	13	14	Ret	12	9	12	5	Ret	6	6	Ret	20†	14	16	6	11	8	17	Ret	Ret	41
15	(Argentina) José María López															5	**1**									35
16	(Italy) Stefano D'Aste	Ret	9	Ret	14	12	11	14	11	15	DNS	10	8	8	12	14	10	10	10	29	9	28	9	8	Ret	22
17	(Switzerland) Fredy Barth	10	14	13	12	11	13	Ret	22†	6	13	Ret	DNS	15	21†			15	7			19	21	DNS	DNS	15
18	(Hong Kong) Charles Ng	15	17	14	10	18	Ret	15	14	18	19	Ret	Ret	14	15	17	19	16	Ret	14	7	27	16	28†	Ret	7
19	(Hong Kong) Darryl O'Young	13	**12**	12	9	14	10	NC	10	20†	DNS	20	9	12	13	15	18	Ret	12	13	10	20	30†	12	Ret	7
20	(France) Hugo Valente							12	19	Ret	DNS			18	14	13	8	13	14			Ret	12	Ret	Ret	4
21	(Germany) Franz Engstler	19†	13	17	8	19	Ret	13	Ret	19†	14	19	15	21†	18	19	15	17	Ret			13	28†	13	14	4
22	(United Kingdom) Tom Boardman	18†	16	DNS	DNS	Ret	18	Ret	15					20†	DNS			21	22†	25†	Ret	9	11	9	Ret	4
23	(Macau) Henry Ho																			24	21	23	25	19	9	2
24	(Spain) Fernando Monje	12	15	11	**Ret**	15	16	16	18	Ret	17	15	18	15	Ret	16	14	23	15	10	13	29	19			1
25	(Macau) Célio Alves Dias																							23	10	1
—	(France) Jean-Philippe Dayraut	11	18																							0
—	(Macau) Kin Veng Ng																			22	20	26	26	22	11	0
—	(Japan) Takuya Izawa																			12	22†					0
—	(Macau) Lam Kam San																							26	12	0
—	(Russia) Mikhail Kozlovskiy			16	13	20	20	17	20	16	15	14	Ret	19	19	Ret	16	19	18	15	19	17	20	14	Ret	0
—	(Macau) Mak Ka Lok																			23	Ret	25	27	27	13	0
—	(Germany) René Münnich	16	21	15	Ret	21	19	18	21	17	18	16	19†	Ret	Ret	18	17	22	19	16	14	18	22	16	Ret	0
—	(Sweden) Rickard Rydell																					14	29†			0
—	(Japan) Masaki Kano																			19	15					0
—	(Macau) Felipe De Souza																			21	Ret	22	24	20	15	0
—	(Sweden) Thed Björk																					DNS	15			0
—	(Russia) Nikolay Karamyshev											21	17	16	16											0
—	(Japan) Yukinori Taniguchi																			17	16	21	23	17	Ret	0
—	(Macau) Jerónimo Badaraco																			20	18	24	Ret	25	Ret	0
—	(Japan) Hiroki Yoshimoto																			18	Ret					0
—	(Hong Kong) Michael Soong																							18	Ret	0
—	(Macau) Jo Merszei																							21	Ret	0
—	(Macau) Eurico de Jesus																							24	Ret	0
—	(Latvia) Konstantīns Calko																							29†	Ret	0
—	(Russia) Aleksei Dudukalo	DNS	DNS																							0
Pos.	Driver	ITA (Italy)		MAR (Morocco)		SVK (Slovakia)		HUN (Hungary)		AUT (Austria)		RUS (Russia)		POR (Portugal)		ARG (Argentina)		USA (United States)		JPN (Japan)		CHN (China)		MAC (Macau)		Pts.

Colour	Result
Gold	Winner
Silver	Second place
Bronze	Third place
Green	Points classification
Blue	Non-points classification
Blue	Non-classified finish (NC)
Purple	Retired, not classified (Ret)
Red	Did not qualify (DNQ)
Red	Did not pre-qualify (DNPQ)
Black	Disqualified (DSQ)
White	Did not start (DNS)
White	Withdrew (WD)
White	Race cancelled (C)
Blank	Did not practice (DNP)
Blank	Did not arrive (DNA)
Blank	Excluded (EX)

**Bold** – Pole
Italics – Fastest Lap

† – Drivers did not finish the race, but were classified as they completed over 75% of the race distance.

==== Manufacturers' Championship ====
Pos.	Manufacturer	ITA (Italy)		MAR (Morocco)		SVK (Slovakia)		HUN (Hungary)		AUT (Austria)		RUS (Russia)		POR (Portugal)		ARG (Argentina)		USA (United States)		JPN (Japan)		CHN (China)		MAC (Macau)		Pts.
1	(Japan) Honda	4^{1}	3	2^{1}	Ret	1^{1}	3	3^{1}	13	12^{1}	4	6^{1}	7	9^{3}	11	4^{1}	2	6^{2}	1	27^{2}	3	7^{1}	2	2^{1}	9	1017
1	(Japan) Honda	5^{3}	8	Ret^{3}	DNS	2^{2}	5	Ret^{2}	Ret	13^{2}	8	12^{4}	12	Ret^{1}	20	10^{2}	6	2^{1}	5	28^{1}	4	11^{2}	1	DNS^{2}	Ret	1017
2	(Russia) Lada	DNS^{2}	DNS	10^{2}	13	13^{3}	14	17^{4}	12	9^{4}	12	5^{2}	Ret	6^{2}	6	Ret^{3}	16	14^{3}	16	6^{3}	11	8^{3}	17	15^{3}	Ret	601
2	(Russia) Lada	DNS^{4}	DNS	16^{4}	Ret	20^{4}	20	Ret^{3}	20	16^{3}	15	14^{3}	Ret	19^{4}	19	Ret^{4}	20	19^{4}	18	15^{4}	19	17^{4}	20	Ret^{4}	Ret	601
Pos.	Manufacturer	ITA (Italy)		MAR (Morocco)		SVK (Slovakia)		HUN (Hungary)		AUT (Austria)		RUS (Russia)		POR (Portugal)		ARG (Argentina)		USA (United States)		JPN (Japan)		CHN (China)		MAC (Macau)		Pts.

=== Yokohama Trophies ===
World Touring Car Championship promoter Eurosport Events organized the Yokohama Drivers' Trophy and the Yokohama Teams' Trophy within the 2013 FIA World Touring Car Championship.

==== Yokohama Drivers' Trophy ====
Pos.	Driver	ITA (Italy)		MAR (Morocco)		SVK (Slovakia)		HUN (Hungary)		AUT (Austria)		RUS (Russia)		POR (Portugal)		ARG (Argentina)		USA (United States)		JPN (Japan)		CHN (China)		MAC (Macau)		Pts.
1	(United Kingdom) James Nash	7	7	**3**	4	6	**17**	**9**	4	2	**1**	8	10	11	**1**	9	7	5	8	5	5	**3**	6	6	4	208
2	(United Kingdom) Alex MacDowall	**3**	20†	6	Ret	**8**	8	8	**3**	5	6	13	11	13	17	**11**	11	**4**	13	**2**	12	4	**13**	**5**	5	168
3	(Denmark) Michel Nykjær	20	2	1	7	7	12	10	9	**1**	5	**7**	1	**3**	3	6	4	12	17							134
4	(Morocco) Mehdi Bennani	17	19	18	11	10	9	5	2	4	16	11	**16**	Ret	10	20	21†	18	**2**	11	**2**	15	14	11	Ret	102
5	(Italy) Stefano D'Aste	Ret	9	Ret	14	12	11	14	11	15	DNS	10	8	8	12	14	10	10	10	29	9	28	9	8	Ret	96
6	(Hong Kong) Darryl O'Young	13	**12**	12	9	14	10	NC	10	20†	DNS	20	9	12	13	15	18	Ret	12	13	10	20	30†	12	Ret	66
7	(Switzerland) Fredy Barth	10	14	13	12	11	13	Ret	22†	6	13	Ret	DNS	17	21†			15	7			19	21	DNS	DNS	43
8	(Germany) Franz Engstler	19†	13	17	8	19	Ret	13	Ret	19†	14	19	15	21†	18	19	15	17	Ret			13	28†	13	14	34
9	(Spain) Fernando Monje	12	15	11	**Ret**	15	16	16	18	Ret	17	15	18	15	Ret	16	14	23	15	10	13	29	19			34
10	(Hong Kong) Charles Ng	15	17	14	10	18	Ret	15	14	18	19	Ret	Ret	14	15	17	19	16	Ret	14	7	27	16	28†	Ret	30
11	(France) Hugo Valente							12	19	Ret	DNS			18	14	13	8	13	14			Ret	12	Ret	Ret	27
12	(United Kingdom) Tom Boardman	18†	16	DNS	DNS	Ret	18	Ret	15					20†	DNS			21	22	25†	Ret	9	11	9	Ret	24
13	(Argentina) José María López															5	**1**									20
14	(Germany) René Münnich	16	21	15	Ret	21	19	18	21	17	18	16	19†	Ret	Ret	18	17	22	19	16	14	18	22	16	Ret	15
15	(Macau) Henry Ho																			24	21	23	25	19	9	12
16	(Macau) Célio Alves Dias																							23	10	10
17	(Macau) Kin Veng Ng																			22	20	26	26	22	11	8
18	(Macau) Lam Kam San																							26	12	6
19	(France) Jean-Philippe Dayraut	11	18																							5
20	(Macau) Mak Ka Lok																			23	Ret	25	27	27	13	4
21	(Russia) Nikolay Karamyshev											21	17	16	16											3
22	(Japan) Yukinori Taniguchi																			17	16	21	23	17	Ret	1
–	(Japan) Masaki Kano																			19	15					0
–	(Macau) Felipe De Souza																			21	Ret	22	24	20	15	0
–	(Macau) Jerónimo Badaraco																			20	18	24	Ret	25	Ret	0
–	(Japan) Hiroki Yoshimoto																			18	Ret					0
–	(Hong Kong) Michael Soong																							18	Ret	0
–	(Macau) Jo Merszei																							21	Ret	0
–	(Macau) Eurico de Jesus																							24	Ret	0
–	(Latvia) Konstantīns Calko																							29†	Ret	0
Pos.	Driver	ITA (Italy)		MAR (Morocco)		SVK (Slovakia)		HUN (Hungary)		AUT (Austria)		RUS (Russia)		POR (Portugal)		ARG (Argentina)		USA (United States)		JPN (Japan)		CHN (China)		MAC (Macau)		Pts.

Colour	Result
Gold	Winner
Silver	Second place
Bronze	Third place
Green	Points classification
Blue	Non-points classification
Blue	Non-classified finish (NC)
Purple	Retired, not classified (Ret)
Red	Did not qualify (DNQ)
Red	Did not pre-qualify (DNPQ)
Black	Disqualified (DSQ)
White	Did not start (DNS)
White	Withdrew (WD)
White	Race cancelled (C)
Blank	Did not practice (DNP)
Blank	Did not arrive (DNA)
Blank	Excluded (EX)

**Bold** – Pole
Italics – Fastest Lap

Eligibility for the Yokohama Drivers' Trophy was decided by Eurosport Events, taking into consideration the Team's CV and records, the Driver's CV and records and the car's technical characteristics.

==== Yokohama Teams' Trophy ====
Pos.	Team	ITA (Italy)		MAR (Morocco)		SVK (Slovakia)		HUN (Hungary)		AUT (Austria)		RUS (Russia)		POR (Portugal)		ARG (Argentina)		USA (United States)		JPN (Japan)		CHN (China)		MAC (Macau)		Pts.
1	(United Kingdom) RML	1	1	4	2	4	2	1	5	3	2	1	2	1	7	1	12	1	4	3	6	1	5	1	6	260
1	(United Kingdom) RML	2	5	Ret	3	Ret	7	7	7	7	NC	9	6	2	9	3	13	3	11	4	Ret	2	10	Ret	Ret	260
2	(United Kingdom) bamboo-engineering	3	7	3	4	6	8	8	3	2	1	8	10	11	1	9	7	4	8	2	5	3	6	5	4	183
2	(United Kingdom) bamboo-engineering	7	20†	6	Ret	8	17	9	4	5	6	13	11	13	17	11	11	5	13	5	13	4	13	6	5	183
3	(Germany) ALL-INKL.COM Münnich Motorsport	6	4	5	5	16	4	4	1	8	9	4	3	5	2	8	17	8	9	7	8	6	4	3	1	150
3	(Germany) ALL-INKL.COM Münnich Motorsport	14	10	7	Ret	17	15	11	17	17	11	16	13	10	5	12	Ret	9	20†	9	9	15	18	7	7	150
4	(Hungary) Zengő Motorsport	8	22	Ret	15†	3	21	2	8	14	3	3	5	Ret	DNS	7	5	20	3	1	Ret	10	3	4	Ret	87
5	(Italy) ROAL Motorsport	9	11	9	6	5	1	6	6	10	10	2	9	7	8	15	9	7	6	8	1	12	8	10	3	84
5	(Italy) ROAL Motorsport	13	12	12	9	14	10	NC	10	20†	DNS	20	14	12	13	NC	18	Ret	12	13	11	20	30†	12	Ret	84
6	(Spain) Tuenti Racing Team	Ret	6	8	1	9	6	Ret	16	11	7	17	4	4	4	2	3	11	21†	26†	Ret	5	7	15	2	81
7	(Sweden) NIKA Racing	20	2	1	7	7	12	10	9	1	5	7	1	3	3	6	4	12	17	18	Ret	14	29†	17	Ret	75
8	(Italy) Proteam Racing	17	19	18	11	10	9	5	2	4	16	11	16	Ret	10	20	21†	18	2	11	2	16	14	11	Ret	39
9	(Germany) Wiechers-Sport	10	14	13	12	11	13	Ret	22†	6	13	Ret	DNS	17	21†	5	1	17	7	17	17	19	21	DNS	DNS	23
10	(Italy) PB Racing	Ret	9	Ret	14	12	11	14	11	15	DNS	10	8	8	12	14	10	10	10	29	10	28	9	8	Ret	18
11	(Germany) Liqui Moly Team Engstler	19†	13	14	8	18	Ret	13	14	18	14	19	15	14	15	17	15	16	Ret	14	7	13	16	13	9	7
11	(Germany) Liqui Moly Team Engstler	15	17	17	10	19	Ret	15	Ret	19†	19	Ret	Ret	21†	18	19	19	17	Ret	19	16	23	25	19	14	7
12	(United Kingdom) Special Tuning Racing	18†	16	DNS	DNS	Ret	18	Ret	15					20†	DNS			21	22†	25†	Ret	9	11	9	Ret	4
13	(Spain) Campos Racing	12	15	11	Ret	15	16	12	18	Ret	17	15	17	15	14	13	8	13	14	10	14	21	12	18	Ret	3
13	(Spain) Campos Racing							16	19	Ret	DNS	21	18	16	16	16	14	23	15			29	19	29†	Ret	3
—	China Dragon Racing																			21	20	22	24	20	10	0
—	China Dragon Racing																			22	Ret	26	26	22	11	0
—	(France) ANOME	11	18																							0
—	(Macau) RPM Racing																			23	Ret	25	27	27	13	0
—	(Macau) Son Veng Racing Team																			20	18	24	Ret	25	Ret	0
—	PAS Macau Racing Team																							24	Ret	0
Pos.	Team	ITA (Italy)		MAR (Morocco)		SVK (Slovakia)		HUN (Hungary)		AUT (Austria)		RUS (Russia)		POR (Portugal)		ARG (Argentina)		USA (United States)		JPN (Japan)		CHN (China)		MAC (Macau)		Pts.

All the teams taking part in the championship were eligible to score points towards the Yokohama Teams' Trophy, with the exception of teams which incorporated a car manufacturer's name in the team's name.

==== Eurosport Asia Trophy ====
Pos.	Driver	JPN (Japan)		CHN (China)		MAC (Macau)		Pts.
1	(Japan) Yukinori Taniguchi	17	16	21	23	17	Ret	46
2	(Macau) Henry Ho	24	21	23	25	19	9	32
3	(Macau) Felipe De Souza	21	Ret	22	24	20	15	27
4	(Macau) Kin Veng Ng	22	20	26	26	22	11	24
5	(Japan) Masaki Kano	19	15					15
6	(Macau) Jerónimo Badaraco	20	18	24	Ret	25	Ret	15
7	(Japan) Takuya Izawa	12	22†					13
8	(Macau) Mak Ka Lok	23	Ret	25	27	27	13	13
9	(Macau) Célio Alves Dias					23	10	10
10	(Hong Kong) Michael Soong					18	Ret	8
11	(Japan) Hiroki Yoshimoto	18	Ret					6
12	(Macau) Lam Kam San					26	12	5
13	(Macau) Jo Merszei					21	Ret	4
14	(Macau) Eurico de Jesus					24	Ret	1
Pos.	Driver	JPN (Japan)		CHN (China)		MAC (Macau)		Pts.

† – Drivers did not finish the race, but were classified as they completed over 75% of the race distance.
