= Jean-Philippe Dayraut =

French racing driver (born 1969)

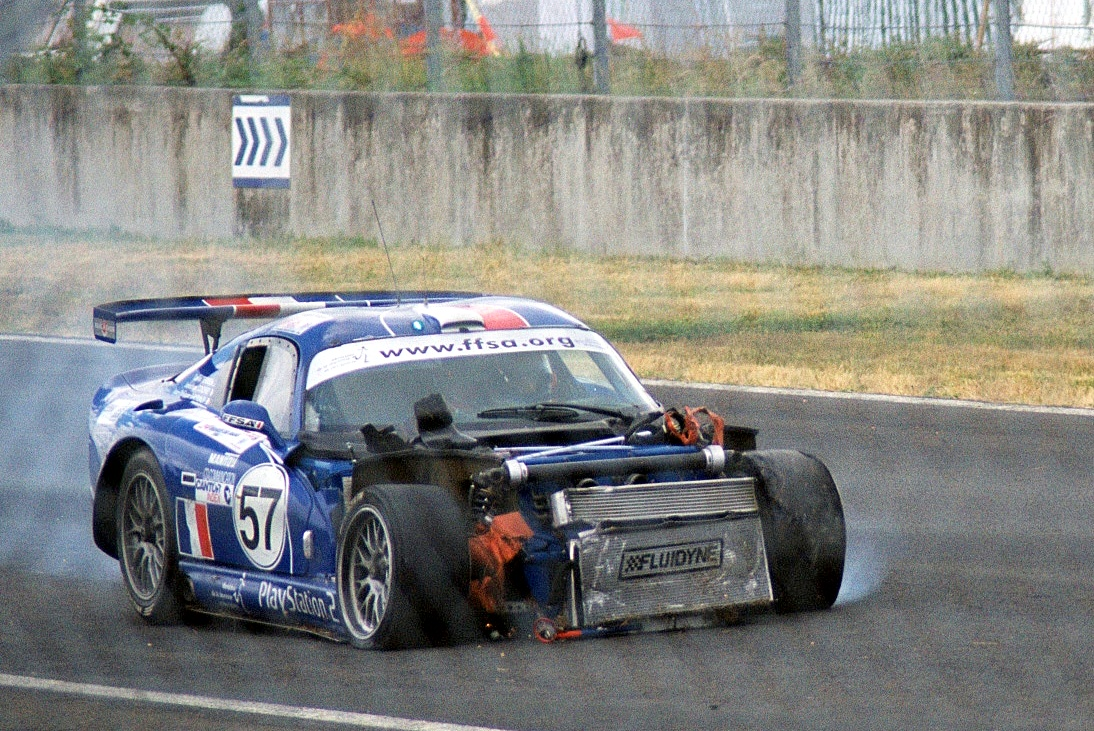
- Dayraut in 2001
- Nationality: French
- Born: 14 April 1969 (age 57) Toulouse, France

Previous series
- 2013 2009 2009–2010 2008 2007–2011 2006, 2011 2005, 2009 2003 2000–01, 2004 1999: WTCC; Bioracing Series; International GT Open; FIA GT Championship; French GT Championship; Eurocup Mégane Trophy; Porsche Carrera Cup France; Peugeot 206 RC Cup France; French Supertouring Championship; Formula France Championship

Championship titles
- 2009-2011, 2013-2015 2001 1999: Andros Trophy; French Supertouring Championship; Formula France Championship

Jean-Philippe Dayraut (born 14 April 1969) is a French auto racing driver. Born in Toulouse, he has won the Andros Trophy ice racing championship fours times between 2009 and 2013. He also developed the Mitjet silhouette racecars and is manager of the Circuit d'Albi.

== Racing career ==
=== Andros Trophy ===
Dayraut won his first Andros Trophy title in 2009 and went on to defend it successfully in 2010 and 2011 while driving a Škoda Fabia. He switched to the Mini Countryman for 2012 and went into the final round in contention for the title but lost out to former Formula One driver Alain Prost. He won his fourth title in 2013, following up with two more titles the following years.

=== World Touring Car Championship ===
Dayraut joined the ANOME team for the 2013 World Touring Car Championship season, driving a BMW 320 TC on a race–by–race basis starting with the season opening Race of Italy. He qualified in 23rd place and achieved a best finished of eleventh in race one.

== Racing record ==
=== 24 Hours of Le Mans results ===
Year	Team	Co-Drivers	Car	Class	Laps	Pos.	Class Pos.
2001	Equipe de France FFSA; Epsilon Sport; Oreca	(France) David Terrien (France) Jonathan Cochet	Chrysler Viper GTS-R	GTS	4	DNF	DNF

=== Complete World Touring Car Championship results ===
(key) (Races in bold indicate pole position) (Races in italics indicate fastest lap)

Year	Team	Car	1	2	3	4	5	6	7	8	9	10	11	12	13	14	15	16	17	18	19	20	21	22	23	24	Pos	Pts
2013	ANOME	BMW 320 TC	ITA; 1; 11	ITA; 2; 18	MAR; 1	MAR; 2	SVK; 1	SVK; 2	HUN; 1	HUN; 2	AUT; 1	AUT; 2	RUS; 1	RUS; 2	POR; 1	POR; 2	ARG; 1	ARG; 2	USA; 1	USA; 2	JPN; 1	JPN; 2	CHN; 1	CHN; 2	MAC; 1	MAC; 2	NC	0
