= René Münnich =

German auto racing driver, team owner and entrepreneur

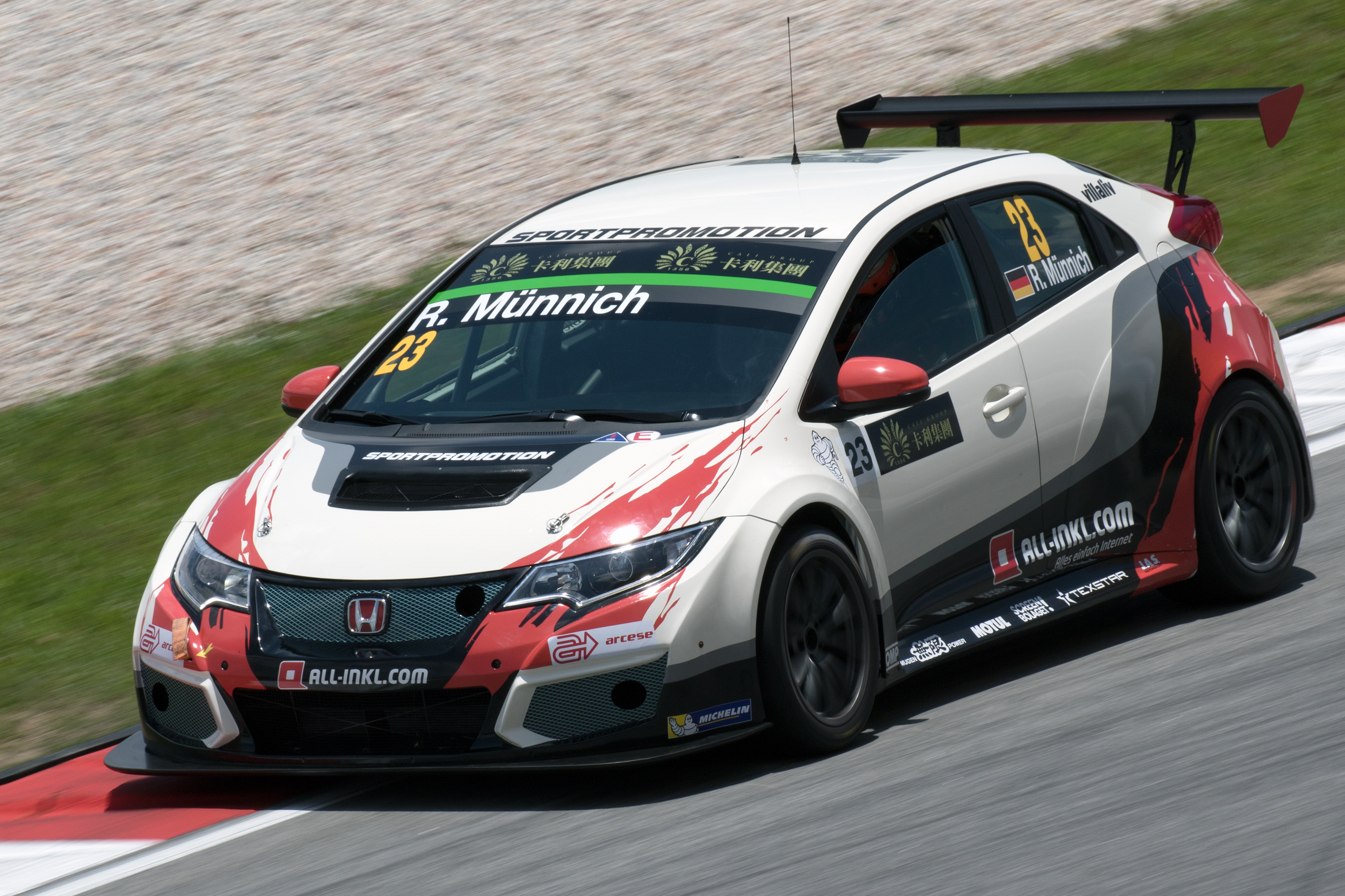
- Nationality: (Germany) German
- Born: 6 May 1977 (age 49) Löbau, East Germany

World Touring Car Championship career
- Debut season: 2012
- Current team: All-Inkl.com Münnich Motorsport
- Categorisation: FIA Bronze
- Car number: 77
- Former teams: Special Tuning Racing
- Starts: 52
- Wins: 0
- Poles: 0
- Fastest laps: 0
- Best finish: 19th in 2014

FIA ERX Supercar Championship career
- Debut season: 2011
- Current team: All-Inkl.com Münnich Motorsport
- Car number: 77
- Starts: 29
- Wins: 1
- Podiums: 3
- Best finish: 5th in 2018

FIA World Rallycross Championship career
- Debut season: 2014
- Current team: All-Inkl.com Münnich Motorsport
- Car number: 77
- Starts: 58
- Wins: 0
- Podiums: 0
- Best finish: 8th in 2022, 2023

Previous series
- 2012–2013 2008–2010 2007 2007 2006–2011 2005: European Rallycross Super1600; European Rallycross Division 1 European Rallycross Division 1A; ADAC Procar Series; German Rallycross Championship; German Autocross Championship

Championship titles
- 2007, 2009–11: German Rallycross Championship

René Münnich (born 6 May 1977) is a German auto racing driver, team owner and entrepreneur. He is the owner and team manager of Münnich Motorsport. Münnich is also the owner of Web hosting service all-inkl.com. He made his debut in the World Touring Car Championship at the 2012 FIA WTCC Race of Japan.

== Racing career ==
=== World Touring Car Championship ===
==== Special Tuning Racing (2012) ====
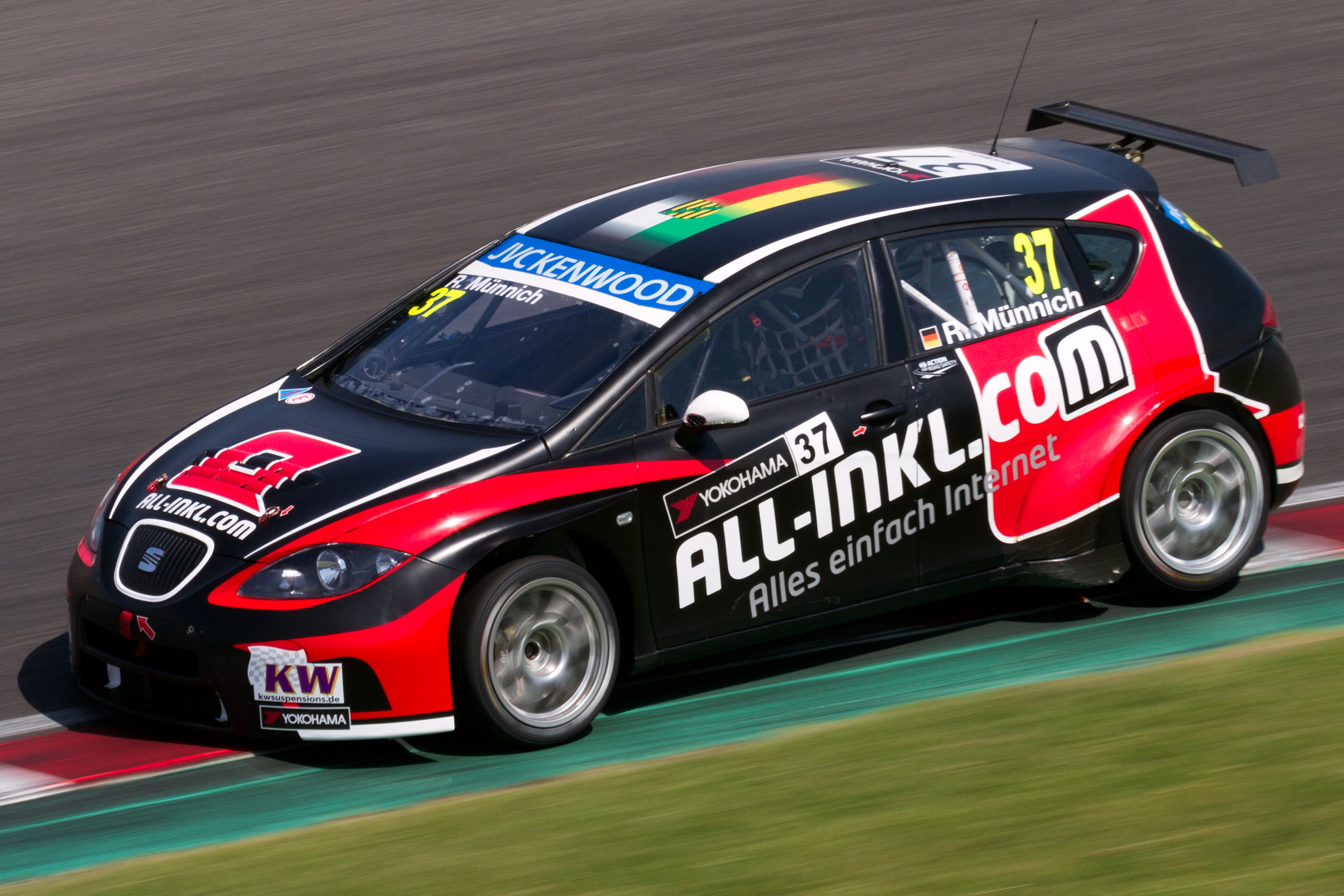
Munnich competing in the 2013 World Touring Car Championship.

Born in Löbau, Münnich made his debut in the World Touring Car Championship at the 2012 FIA WTCC Race of Japan, driving the Special Tuning Racing SEAT León WTCC that was previously raced by Darryl O'Young. The drive would allow him to assess a possible move for his Münnich Motorsport team to the WTCC in 2013, following the discontinuation of the FIA GT1 World Championship. His best result of the weekend was 17th in race one.

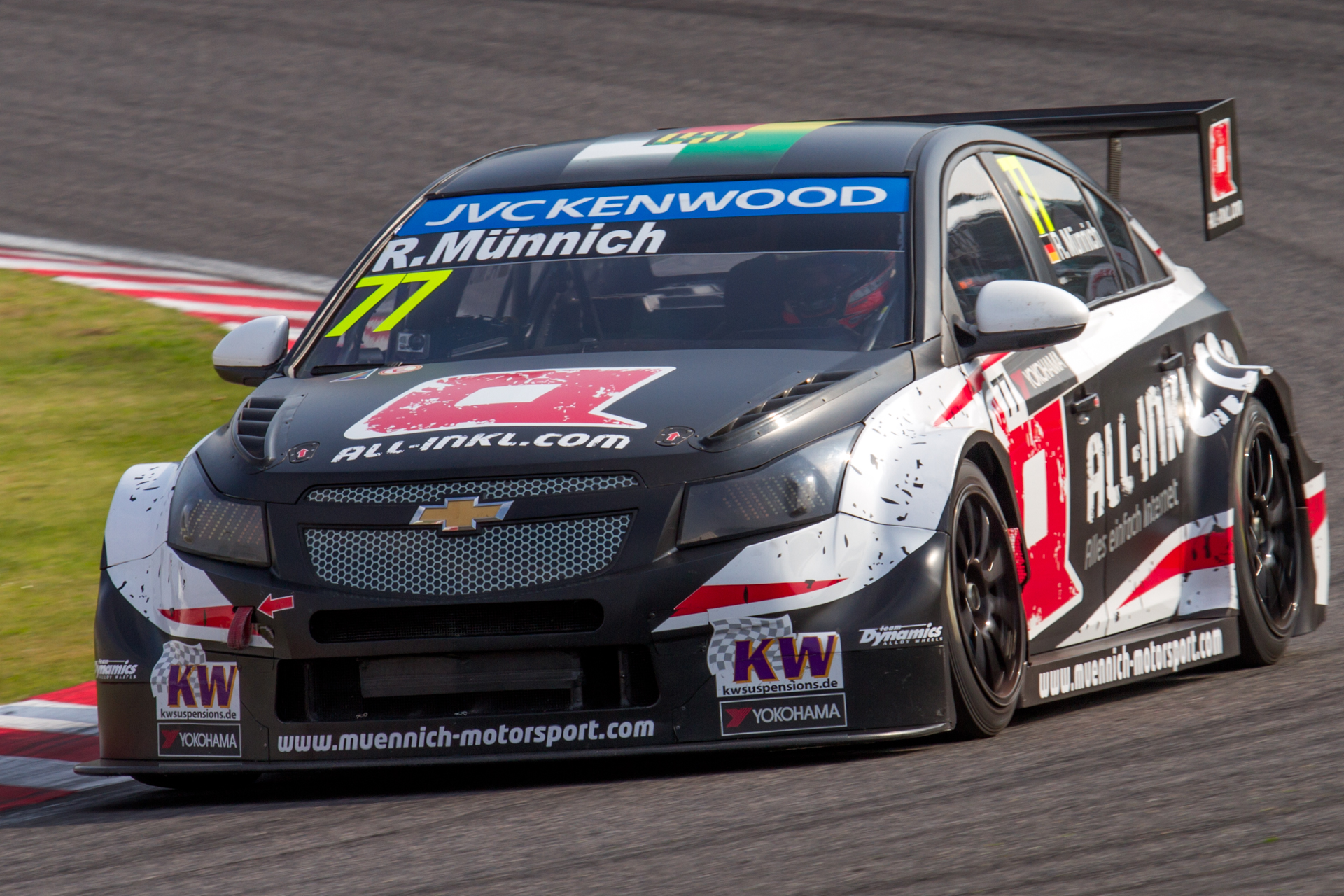
Münnich competing in the 2014 World Touring Car Championship.

==== Münnich Motorsport (2013–) ====
In November 2012, Münnich Motorsport were in final discussions to purchase three SEAT Leóns to compete in the 2013 World Touring Car Championship season for Markus Winkelhock, Marc Basseng, and Münnich himself. Soon after, Münnich Motorsport completed the purchase of two cars from the Lukoil Racing Team.

Winkelhock decided at the last minute to pull out of the project as he wanted to focus solely on GT racing, allowing the door open for reigning World Touring Car champion Robert Huff to join the team after leaving Chevrolet.

== Racing record ==
=== Complete World Touring Car Championship results ===
(key) (Races in bold indicate pole position) (Races in italics indicate fastest lap)

Year	Team	Car	1	2	3	4	5	6	7	8	9	10	11	12	13	14	15	16	17	18	19	20	21	22	23	24	DC	Points
2012	Special Tuning Racing	SEAT León WTCC	ITA; 1	ITA; 2	ESP; 1	ESP; 2	MAR; 1	MAR; 2	SVK; 1	SVK; 2	HUN; 1	HUN; 2	AUT; 1	AUT; 2	POR; 1	POR; 2	BRA; 1	BRA; 2	USA; 1	USA; 2	JPN; 1; 17	JPN; 2; 20	CHN; 1	CHN; 2	MAC; 1	MAC; 2	NC	0
2013	All-Inkl.com Münnich Motorsport	SEAT León WTCC	ITA; 1; 16	ITA; 2; 21	MAR; 1; 15	MAR; 2 Ret	SVK; 1; 21	SVK; 2; 19	HUN; 1; 18	HUN; 2; 21	AUT; 1; 17	AUT; 2; 18	RUS; 1; 16	RUS; 2; 19	POR; 1 Ret	POR; 2 Ret	ARG; 1; 18	ARG; 2; 17	USA; 1; 22	USA; 2; 19	JPN; 1; 16	JPN; 2; 14	CHN; 1; 18	CHN; 2; 22	MAC; 1; 16	MAC; 2 Ret	NC	0
2014	All-Inkl.com Münnich Motorsport	Chevrolet RML Cruze TC1	MAR; 1 Ret	MAR; 2 Ret	FRA; 1; 12	FRA; 2; 12	HUN; 1; 19	HUN; 2; 13	SVK; 1; 13	SVK; 2 C	AUT; 1; 11	AUT; 2; 9	RUS; 1; 13	RUS; 2; 10	BEL; 1; 15	BEL; 2; 14	ARG; 1; 13	ARG; 2; 12	BEI; 1 Ret	BEI; 2 DNS	CHN; 1; 17†	CHN; 2 Ret	JPN; 1 NC	JPN; 2; 16	MAC; 1; 15	MAC; 2; 11	19th	3
2016	All-Inkl.com Münnich Motorsport	Chevrolet RML Cruze TC1	FRA; 1; 14	FRA; 2 Ret	SVK; 1	SVK; 2	HUN; 1; 9	HUN; 2; 15	MAR; 1	MAR; 2	GER; 1	GER; 2	RUS; 1	RUS; 2	POR; 1	POR; 2	ARG; 1	ARG; 2	JPN; 1	JPN; 2	CHN; 1	CHN; 2	QAT; 1	QAT; 2			21st	2

^{†} Driver did not finish the race, but was classified as he completed over 90% of the race distance.

=== Complete Blancpain Sprint Series results ===
Year	Team	Car	Class	1	2	3	4	5	6	7	8	9	10	11	12	13	14	Pos.	Points
2014	All-Inkl.com Münnich Motorsport	Mercedes-Benz SLS AMG GT3	Pro-Am	NOG; QR	NOG; CR	BRH; QR	BRH; CR	ZAN; QR	ZAN; CR	SVK; QR; 14	SVK; CR; Ret	ALG; QR	ALG; CR	ZOL; QR	ZOL; CR	BAK; QR	BAK; CR	52nd	0

=== Complete TCR International Series results ===
(key) (Races in bold indicate pole position) (Races in italics indicate fastest lap)

Year	Team	Car	1	2	3	4	5	6	7	8	9	10	11	12	13	14	15	16	17	18	19	20	21	22	DC	Points
2015	WestCoast Racing	Honda Civic TCR	MYS; 1 Ret	MYS; 2; 6	CHN; 1; 2	CHN; 2; 14	ESP; 1	ESP; 2	POR; 1	POR; 2	ITA; 1	ITA; 2	AUT; 1	AUT; 2	RUS; 1	RUS; 2	RBR; 1	RBR; 2	SIN; 1; 11	SIN; 2; 10	THA; 1; 9	THA; 2 Ret	MAC; 1	MAC; 2	11th	34

=== Complete FIA European Rallycross Championship results ===
==== Division 1A ====
Year	Entrant	Car	1	2	3	4	5	6	7	8	9	10	ERX	Points
2007	Münnich Motorsport	Volkswagen Polo GTI	POR	FRA	HUN; 4	AUT	SWE	NOR	BEL	NED	POL	CZE	25th	13

==== Division 1 ====
Year	Entrant	Car	1	2	3	4	5	6	7	8	9	10	11	ERX	Points
2008	Münnich Motorsport	Škoda Fabia T16 4x4	POR; NC	FRA	HUN; NC	AUT; NC	NOR; NC	SWE; NC	BEL; 16	NED (NC)	CZE; NC	POL; NC	GER; NC	36th	1
2009	Münnich Motorsport	Škoda Fabia T16 4x4	GBR (NC)	POR; 14	FRA; 20	HUN; NC	AUT; NC	SWE	BEL	GER	POL; NC	CZE; 17		33rd	3
2010	All-Inkl.com Münnich Motorsport	Škoda Fabia T16 4x4	POR; 11	FRA; 16	GBR (NC)	HUN; 10	SWE; 19	FIN; 14	BEL (NC)	GER; 13	POL; 8	CZE; NC		15th	30

==== Supercar/RX1 ====
Year	Entrant	Car	1	2	3	4	5	6	7	8	9	10	ERX	Points
2011	All-Inkl.com Münnich Motorsport	Škoda Fabia T16 4x4	GBR (17)	POR; 11	FRA; NC	NOR; 19	SWE; 12	BEL; 20	NED; 13	AUT	POL	CZE; 15	18th	17
2014	All-Inkl.com Münnich Motorsport	Audi S3	GBR	NOR	BEL	GER; 23	ITA; 16						36th	1
2017	All-Inkl.com Münnich Motorsport	SEAT Ibiza	BAR; 4			FRA; 13	LAT; 17						11th	38
2017	All-Inkl.com Münnich Motorsport	Citroën DS3		NOR; 19	SWE; 3								11th	38
2018	All-Inkl.com Münnich Motorsport	SEAT Ibiza	BAR; 11	BEL; 9	SWE; 5	FRA; 10	LAT; 4						7th	52
2019	All-Inkl.com Münnich Motorsport	SEAT Ibiza	GBR; 4	NOR; 9	SWE; 5	GER; 3	FRA; 5	LAT					5th	90
2021	ALL-INKL.COM Münnich Motorsport	SEAT Ibiza	SWE; 10	FRA; 1	LAT	BEL; 8							6th	53
2022	ALL-INKL.COM Münnich Motorsport	SEAT Ibiza	HUN; 19	SWE	NOR	LAT	POR	BEN					39th	0

==== Super1600 ====
Year	Entrant	Car	1	2	3	4	5	6	7	8	9	10	ERX	Points
2012	All-Inkl.com Münnich Motorsport	Škoda Fabia	GBR; 8	FRA; 13	AUT (DNS)	HUN; 13	NOR; 13	SWE; 14	BEL; 4	NED (15)	FIN; 14	GER; 4	10th	53
2013	All-Inkl.com Münnich Motorsport	Škoda Fabia	GBR; 7	POR	HUN; 8	FIN	NOR	SWE; 8	FRA	AUT; 9	GER		10th	54

=== Complete FIA World Rallycross Championship results ===
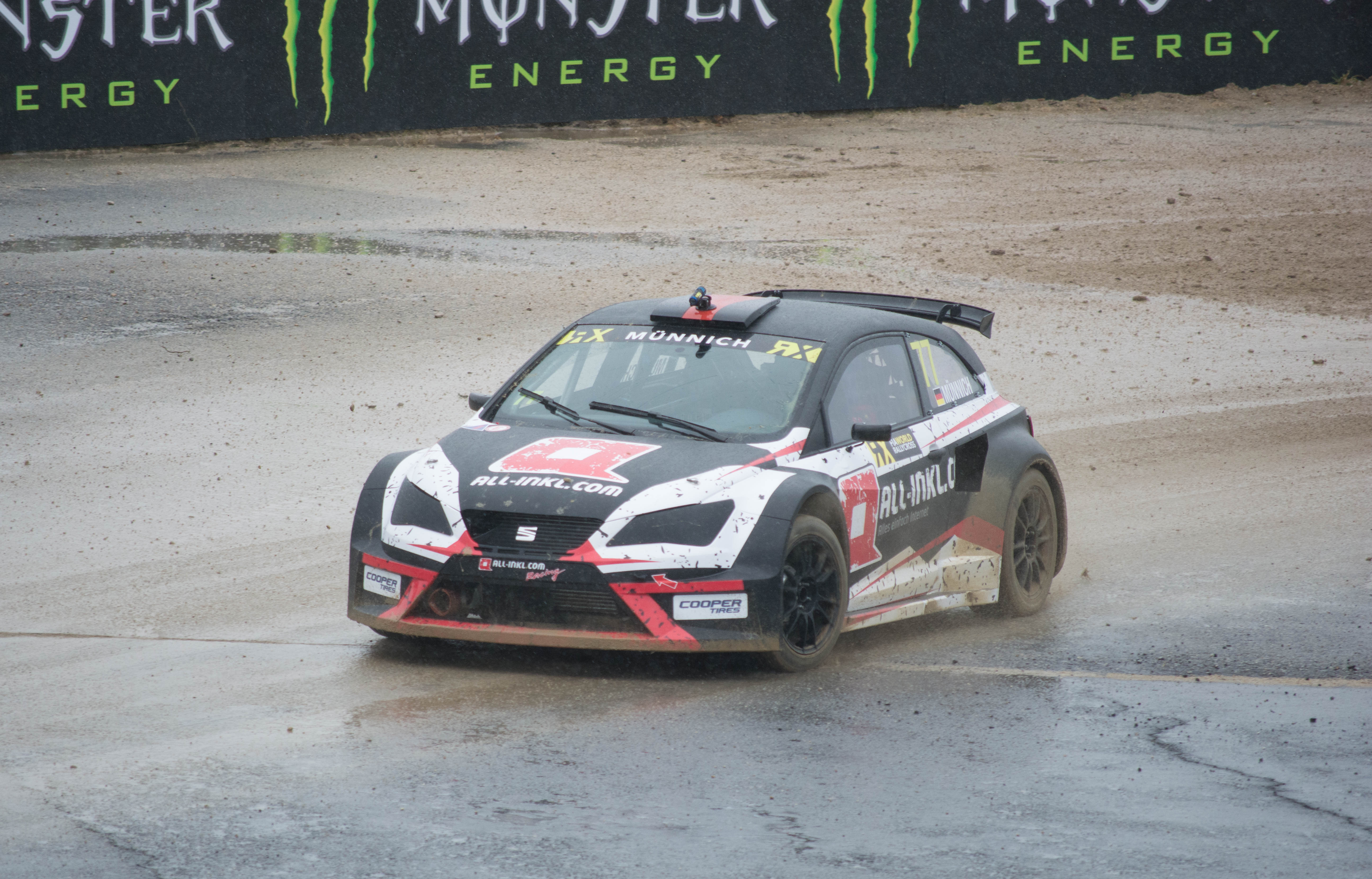
Münnich in action during the 2016 World RX of Portugal

==== Supercar/RX1/RX1e ====
Year	Entrant	Car	1	2	3	4	5	6	7	8	9	10	11	12	13	WRX	Points
2014	All-Inkl.com Münnich Motorsport	Audi S3	POR	GBR	NOR	FIN	SWE; 35	BEL	CAN	FRA	GER; 32	ITA; 25	TUR	ARG		57th	0
2015	All-Inkl.com Münnich Motorsport	Audi S3	POR; 20	HOC; 18	BEL; 19	GBR; 26	GER; 12	SWE; 27	CAN; 19	NOR; 21	FRA; 34	BAR	TUR; 12	ITA; 20	ARG; 18	41st	-2
2016	All-Inkl.com Münnich Motorsport	SEAT Ibiza	POR; 19	HOC; 20	BEL; 18	GBR; 18	NOR; 18	SWE; 19	CAN; 14	FRA; 16	BAR; 18	LAT; 22	GER; 24	ARG; 14		49th	-3
2017	All-Inkl.com Münnich Motorsport	SEAT Ibiza	BAR	POR; 18	HOC; 20	BEL							GER; 19	RSA; 17		27th	0
2017	All-Inkl.com Münnich Motorsport	Citroën DS3					GBR; 17	NOR	SWE	CAN; 18	FRA	LAT				27th	0
2018	All-Inkl.com Münnich Motorsport	SEAT Ibiza RX	BAR	POR	BEL	GBR	NOR; 17	SWE	CAN	FRA	LAT	USA	GER; 16	RSA; 16		24th	2
2020	All-Inkl.com Münnich Motorsport	SEAT Ibiza RX	SWE; 14	SWE; 12	FIN; 16	FIN; 19	LAT; 13	LAT; 14	ESP	ESP						14th	18
2021	ALL-INKL.COM Münnich Motorsport	SEAT Ibiza RX	BAR; 5	SWE	FRA	LAT	LAT	BEL	PRT	GER	GER					18th	16
2022	ALL-INKL.COM Münnich Motorsport	SEAT Ibiza RX1e	NOR; 8	LAT; 6	LAT; 8	POR; 8	POR; 6	BEL; 6	BEL; 8	ESP; 8	ESP; 8	GER				8th	78
2023	ALL-INKL.COM Münnich Motorsport	ZEROID X1	POR	NOR	SWE	GBR	BLX	GER	RSA; 8	RSA; 8	CHN; 8	CHN; 10				8th	30
2024	ALL-INKL.COM Münnich Motorsport	SEAT Ibiza RX	SWE; 10	SWE; 10	HUN; 7	HUN; 6	BNL; 6	BNL; 7	PRT; 5	PRT; 7	TUR	TUR				7th	76

^{*} Season still in progress.

Sporting positions
Preceded by Luca Engstler	TCR Middle East Series; Champion; 2019	Succeeded by Incumbent
