= 2019 TCR Middle East Touring Car Series =

Car racing series

The 2019 TCR Middle East Series season was the third season of the TCR Middle East Series. The series will be promoted by Creventic and Dubai Autodrome.

== Teams and drivers ==
Team	Car	No.	Drivers	Rounds	Endurance co-drivers	Rounds
(Hungary) Zengő Motorsport	CUPRA León TCR	8	(Hungary) Zoltán Zengő	1, 3	(Hungary) Csaba Tóth	1, 3
(Hungary) Zengő Motorsport	CUPRA León TCR	8	(Hungary) Tamás Tenke	2	(Hungary) Zoltán Zengő	2
(Hungary) Zengő Motorsport	CUPRA León TCR	10	(Hungary) Zoltán Zengő	2	(Hungary) Csaba Tóth	2
(Hungary) Zengő Motorsport	CUPRA León TCR	10	(Hungary) Tamás Tenke	3	—N/a (Note: Tamás Tenke only drove car No. 10 in the two sprint races, while Tamás Horváth and Gábor Kismarty-Lechner only drove car No. 10 in the endurance race.)	
(Hungary) Zengő Motorsport	CUPRA León TCR	10	—N/a		(Hungary) Tamás Horváth (Hungary) Gábor Kismarty-Lechner	3
(United Kingdom) J W Bird Motorsport	Volkswagen Golf GTI TCR	21	(United Kingdom) Paul Dehadray	2	—N/a (Note: Paul Dehadray and Kieran Griffin entered in the same car at Round 2. Dehadray participated in Race 1, while Griffin participated in Race 2. For the endurance race they shared the car.)	
(United Kingdom) J W Bird Motorsport	Volkswagen Golf GTI TCR	21	(United Kingdom) Kieran Griffin	2	—N/a	
(Germany) ALL-INKL.COM Münnich Motorsport	Honda Civic Type R TCR (FK8)	77	(Germany) René Münnich	All	(Netherlands) Luc Breukers	All
(Netherlands) Red Camel-Jordans.nl	CUPRA León TCR	101	(Netherlands) Luc Breukers	All	(Lebanon) Yusif Bassil	1, 3
(Netherlands) Red Camel-Jordans.nl	CUPRA León TCR	101	(Netherlands) Luc Breukers	All	(Netherlands) Ivo Breukers	2–3

== Calendar and results ==
The 2019 schedule was announced on 8 August 2018, with three events held across the Middle East.

Rnd.		Circuit	Date	Pole position	Fastest lap	Winning driver	Winning team	Supporting
1	1	(United Arab Emirates) Dubai Autodrome, Dubai (International Circuit)	25 January	(Germany) René Münnich	(Germany) René Münnich	(Germany) René Münnich	(Germany) ALL-INKL.COM Münnich Motorsport	24H Middle East Series
1	2	(United Arab Emirates) Dubai Autodrome, Dubai (International Circuit)	25 January		(Germany) René Münnich	(Germany) René Münnich	(Germany) ALL-INKL.COM Münnich Motorsport	24H Middle East Series
1	3	(United Arab Emirates) Dubai Autodrome, Dubai (International Circuit)	26 January	(Netherlands) Luc Breukers (Germany) René Münnich	(Netherlands) Luc Breukers (Germany) René Münnich	(Hungary) Csaba Tóth (Hungary) Zoltán Zengő	(Hungary) Zengő Motorsport	24H Middle East Series
2	4	(United Arab Emirates) Yas Marina Circuit, Abu Dhabi (GP Circuit)	1 February	(Germany) René Münnich	(Germany) René Münnich	(Germany) René Münnich	(Germany) ALL-INKL.COM Münnich Motorsport	24H Middle East Series
2	5	(United Arab Emirates) Yas Marina Circuit, Abu Dhabi (GP Circuit)	2 February		(Germany) René Münnich	(Germany) René Münnich	(Germany) ALL-INKL.COM Münnich Motorsport	24H Middle East Series
2	6	(United Arab Emirates) Yas Marina Circuit, Abu Dhabi (GP Circuit)	2 February	(Netherlands) Luc Breukers (Germany) René Münnich	(Netherlands) Luc Breukers (Germany) René Münnich	(Netherlands) Ivo Breukers (Netherlands) Luc Breukers	(Netherlands) Red Camel-Jordans.nl	24H Middle East Series
3	7	(United Arab Emirates) Dubai Autodrome, Dubai (GP Circuit)	7 February	(Germany) René Münnich	(Germany) René Münnich	(Germany) René Münnich	(Germany) ALL-INKL.COM Münnich Motorsport	24H Middle East Series
3	8	(United Arab Emirates) Dubai Autodrome, Dubai (GP Circuit)	7 February		(Germany) René Münnich	(Germany) René Münnich	(Germany) ALL-INKL.COM Münnich Motorsport	24H Middle East Series
3	9	(United Arab Emirates) Dubai Autodrome, Dubai (GP Circuit)	7 February	(Netherlands) Luc Breukers (Germany) René Münnich	(Netherlands) Luc Breukers (Germany) René Münnich	(Netherlands) Ivo Breukers (Netherlands) Luc Breukers (Lebanon) Yusif Bassil	(Netherlands) Red Camel-Jordans.nl	24H Middle East Series
