= Camilo Echevarría =

Argentine racing driver

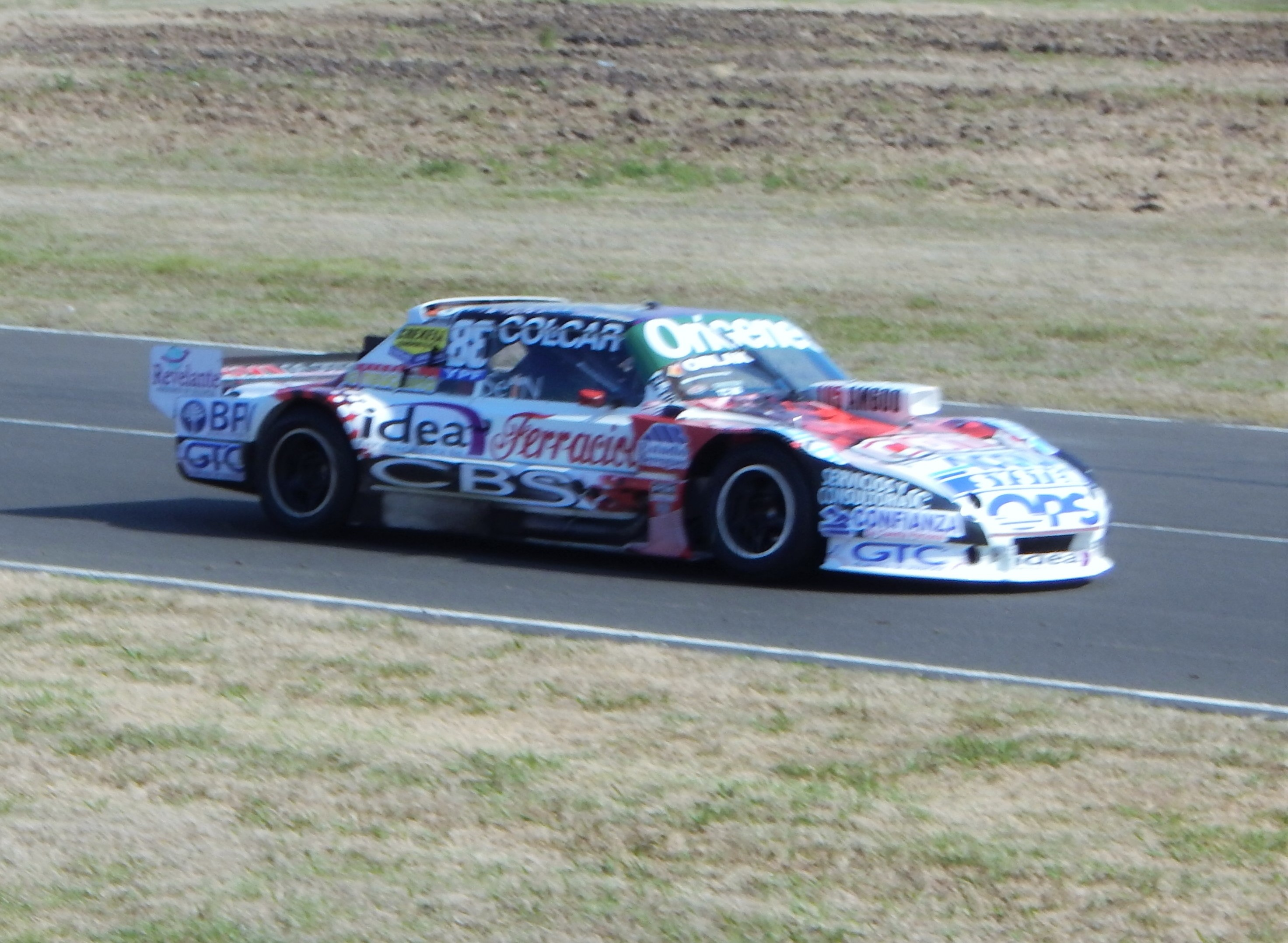
- Camilo Echevarría in TC, 2015
- Nationality: Argentine
- Born: 31 December 1990 (age 35) Neuquén, Neuquén Province

Camilo Echevarría (born 31 December 1990) is a racing driver from Argentina. Since 2015, he has competed in Turismo Carretera championship.

== Career ==
=== Karting ===
Born in Neuquén, Echevarría drove in the 60cc class between 1999 and 2001, winning the regional championship in both 1999 and 2000. In 2000, Echevarría made his debut in the WKA Manufacturers' Cup. In 2001, Echevarría won the national 60cc championship in a Parilla powered kart. After his success, Echevarría graduated into the 100cc and 125cc classes; he was runner up in the national championship for 125cc karts in 2003 and 2005.

=== Formula racing ===
Echevarría made his debut in competitive auto racing in 2007. He drove in the Spanish Formula BMW, the Master Junior Formula. He was selected by the Real Federación Española de Automovilismo and Emilio de Villota out of a group of 145 drivers to race in the class. Echevarría competed in three races, in which he scored one podium finish. In 2008, Echevarría competed in the Formula BMW Talent Cup at Circuit Ricardo Tormo, near Valencia, where he beat George Katsinis for the victory and achieved a new lap record for the Formula BMW class. The following season, Echevarría competed in six races in Formula Renault 1.6 Argentina.

=== Touring car racing ===
In 2009, Echevarría also made his debut in the Top Race V6 Junior class. He won two out of thirteen races in a Ford Mondeo, and ended up third in the championship. After this success, he graduated into the TC Pista championship, the series inferior to Turismo Carretera. During the season he scored two podium finishes at Autódromo Juan y Oscar Gálvez. Echevarría continued to grow into the TC Pista series, as in 2011, he won his first race in the class and scored a total of five podium finishes to end up third in the standings. He continued to win races in the TC Pista series in 2012 and 2013.

In 2014, Echevarría made his debut in the World Touring Car Championship, replacing Pasquale Di Sabatino at Engstler Motorsport for the Race of Argentina at Autódromo Termas de Río Hondo, as Di Sabatino was only scheduled to drive at the European events. He drove a BMW 320 TC for the team. Echevarria finished seventeenth in race one, equating to third in the TC2 class. During race two, Echevarria finished sixteenth overall, second in TC2.

In 2015, Echevarría made his debut in the Turismo Carretera.

== Racing record ==
=== Complete World Touring Car Championship results ===
(key)

Year	Team	Car	1	2	3	4	5	6	7	8	9	10	11	12	13	14	15	16	17	18	19	20	21	22	23	24	DC	Points
2014	Liqui Moly Team Engstler	BMW 320 TC	MAR; 1	MAR; 2	FRA; 1	FRA; 2	HUN; 1	HUN; 2	SVK; 1	SVK; 2	AUT; 1	AUT; 2	RUS; 1	RUS; 2	BEL; 1	BEL; 2	ARG; 1; 17	ARG; 2; 16	BEI; 1	BEI; 2	CHN; 1	CHN; 2	JPN; 1	JPN; 2	MAC; 1	MAC; 2	NC	0
