= 2014 Guia Race of Macau =

Race details
- Round 12 of 12 in the 2014 World Touring Car Championship at Guia Circuit in Macau.
- Date: 16 November, 2014
- Location: Macau
- Course: Guia Circuit; 6.120 kilometres (3.803 mi)

Race One
- Laps: 10
Pole position
| Driver | | (Argentina) José María López | Citroën Total WTCC |
| Time | | 2:24.294 | |
Podium
| First | | (Argentina) José María López | Citroën Total WTCC |
| Second | | (Hungary) Norbert Michelisz | Zengő Motorsport |
| Third | | (Italy) Gabriele Tarquini | Castrol Honda Team |
Fastest Lap
| Driver | | (Argentina) José María López | Citroën Total WTCC |
| Time | | 2:27.338 | |

Race Two
- Laps: 11
Podium
| First | | (United Kingdom) Robert Huff | Lukoil Lada Sport |
| Second | | (France) Yvan Muller | Citroën Total WTCC |
| Third | | (France) Hugo Valente | Campos Racing |
Fastest Lap
| Driver | | (United Kingdom) Robert Huff | Lukoil Lada Sport |
| Time | | 2:27.009 | |

The 2014 Guia Race of Macau was the final round of the 2014 World Touring Car Championship season and the tenth running of the Guia Race of Macau. The race was part of the Macau Grand Prix weekend, headlined by the Formula Three event. It was held on 16 November 2014 at the Guia Circuit in the Chinese special administrative region of Macau.

Race one was won by José María López for Citroën Total WTCC and race two was won by Robert Huff for Lada Sport.

== Background ==
López had secured the drivers' championship at the previous race. His teammates Yvan Muller and Sébastien Loeb were both in contention to finish second in the standings. Franz Engstler had secured the Yokohama Trophy title two rounds previously.

Pepe Oriola returned to the championship with Campos Racing, driving a TC1 Chevrolet Cruze in place of the injured Dušan Borković. William Lok returned to Campos to drive a TC2 SEAT León.

When the compensation weights were revised after the previous round; the Citroën C-Elysée WTCC retained the maximum ballast to keep their weight at 1,160 kilograms (2,557 lb). The only change was to the Chevrolet RML Cruze TC1s which gained 10 kilograms (22 lb) to weigh 1,140 kilograms (2,513 lb).

== Report ==
=== Testing and free practice ===
Norbert Michelisz led the test session on Thursday morning ahead of Muller and López.

Gabriele Tarquini led a Castrol Honda 1–2 in first free practice later on Thursday, teammate Tiago Monteiro was second ahead of López, Muller and Michelisz. Series returnee Pepe Oriola was the fastest Chevrolet in fifth. The session was red–flagged seven minutes in when Hugo Valente crashed his Campos Racing Chevrolet into the barriers.

López led free practice two on Friday ahead of teammate Ma Qing Hua. The session was first interrupted when Henry Kwong crashed into the barrier at Lisboa, the session was then red–flagged when Oriola clipped the barriers at the Esses.

=== Qualifying ===
Michelisz was quickest in the first part of qualifying which was extended due to the length of the Guia Circuit. Five minutes into the session Oriola was involved in an accident which would see the Spaniard ruled out of the rest of the weekend. Mehdi Bennani was the first of the drivers who failed to get through to Q2 along with James Thompson and Mikhail Kozlovskiy. René Münnich failed to qualify within the 107% rule despite setting a time quicker than TC2 driver Felipe De Souza who qualified in 18th.

López topped the times in Q2, Valente was tenth to secure pole race two where he would share the front row with ROAL Motorsport's Tom Chilton. Ma finished eleventh and missed out on the reversed grid opportunity while his three teammates made it through to Q3 along with Tom Coronel and Michelisz.

López recorded his seventh pole of the season on his maiden appearance at the Macau circuit. Citroën filled the first three places, Sébastien Loeb out–qualified Muller who had been suffering with understeer while Michelisz took fourth ahead of Coronel.

=== Race One ===
Michelisz got around Muller and Loeb to move into second as Chilton stalled on the grid. Muller dropped to sixth position behind the two factory Hondas of Tarquini and Monteiro. On lap three Loeb tried a pass around the outside of Michelisz at Lisboa, losing him places to Tarquini, Monteiro and Muller. On lap five Kwong collided with the barriers, teammate Lok then went off at Melco a few seconds later. On lap nine Bennani went off at the start line after a collision with Kwong who was a lap down and trying to get out of the way; Kwong swerved across and tagged Bennani which caused Bennani to lose control and tag the barriers. The race finished with yellow flags in sector one for the stricken Proteam Racing Honda, López claimed a dominant victory with Michelisz and Tarquini completing the podium. Franz Engstler was the Yokohama Trophy winner.

=== Race Two ===
Bennani was unable to start race two due to damage sustained to his car in race one while Tarquini pulled out due to illness. At the start Monteiro got through between front row starters Valente and Chilton, Valente tried to retake the lead at Lisboa but outbraked himself and dropped back. Monteiro now led from Huff and Muller, Michelisz was fourth with Valente and Chilton leading the rest of the pack which was dropping back from the lead battle. Gianni Morbidelli went off at Fishermen's Bend on lap four having lost the rear of his Chevrolet on the exit, the car was quickly lifted away. Lap five saw Loeb pass Coronel at Lisboa to take eighth place, he pulled off a similar move on Chilton on the following lap to take seventh place as Ma unsuccessfully tried to pass Coronel just behind. On lap seven Ma went into the barriers at R bend with the safety car coming out at the end of the following lap while the car was removed. The safety car came in at the end of the lap nine and race distance was extended to eleven laps. Valente pass Michelisz for fourth on the approach to Lisboa, later on in the lap Huff and Muller both leapt ahead of Monteiro who dropping back down the field quickly with steering problems. Huff won the race with Muller and Valente completing the podium, Franz Engstler finished tenth to take the final point and victory in the Yokohama Trophy.

== Results ==
=== Qualifying ===
| Pos. | No. | Name | Team | Car | C | Q1 | Q2 | Q3 | Points |
|---|---|---|---|---|---|---|---|---|---|
| 1 | 37 | (Argentina) José María López | Citroën Total WTCC | Citroën C-Elysée WTCC | **TC1** | 2:26.508 | 2:24.329 | 2:24.294 | **5** |
| 2 | 9 | (France) Sébastien Loeb | Citroën Total WTCC | Citroën C-Elysée WTCC | **TC1** | 2:26.036 | 2:24.536 | 2:24.522 | **4** |
| 3 | 1 | (France) Yvan Muller | Citroën Total WTCC | Citroën C-Elysée WTCC | **TC1** | 2:26.618 | 2:25.035 | 2:24.779 | **3** |
| 4 | 5 | (Hungary) Norbert Michelisz | Zengő Motorsport | Honda Civic WTCC | **TC1** | 2:25.920 | 2:25.699 | 2:25.327 | **2** |
| 5 | 4 | (Netherlands) Tom Coronel | ROAL Motorsport | Chevrolet RML Cruze TC1 | **TC1** | 2:26.661 | 2:25.279 | no time set | **1** |
| 6 | 2 | (Italy) Gabriele Tarquini | Castrol Honda World Touring Car Team | Honda Civic WTCC | **TC1** | 2:26.647 | 2:25.769 | | |
| 7 | 18 | (Portugal) Tiago Monteiro | Castrol Honda World Touring Car Team | Honda Civic WTCC | **TC1** | 2:26.661 | 2:25.825 | | |
| 8 | 12 | (United Kingdom) Robert Huff | Lukoil Lada Sport | Lada Granta 1.6T | **TC1** | 2:26.783 | 2:25.866 | | |
| 9 | 3 | (United Kingdom) Tom Chilton | ROAL Motorsport | Chevrolet RML Cruze TC1 | **TC1** | 2:27.034 | 2:26.187 | | |
| 10 | 7 | (France) **Hugo Valente** | Campos Racing | Chevrolet RML Cruze TC1 | **TC1** | 2:27.052 | 2:26.204 | | |
| 11 | 33 | (China) Ma Qing Hua | Citroën Total WTCC | Citroën C-Elysée WTCC | **TC1** | 2:27.093 | 2:26.535 | | |
| 12 | 10 | (Italy) Gianni Morbidelli | ALL-INKL.COM Münnich Motorsport | Chevrolet RML Cruze TC1 | **TC1** | 2:26.543 | 2:26.911 | | |
| 13 | 25 | (Morocco) Mehdi Bennani | Proteam Racing | Honda Civic WTCC | **TC1** | 2:27.630 | | | |
| 14 | 11 | (United Kingdom) James Thompson | Lukoil Lada Sport | Lada Granta 1.6T | **TC1** | 2:27.667 | | | |
| 15 | 14 | (Russia) Mikhail Kozlovskiy | Lukoil Lada Sport | Lada Granta 1.6T | **TC1** | 2:28.602 | | | |
| 16 | 6 | (Germany) Franz Engstler | Liqui Moly Team Engstler | BMW 320 TC | **TC2T** | 2:34.015 | | | |
| 17 | 27 | (France) John Filippi | Campos Racing | SEAT León WTCC | **TC2T** | 2:35.656 | | | |
| 18 | 26 | (Macau) Felipe De Souza | Liqui Moly Team Engstler | BMW 320 TC | **TC2T** **A** | 2:38.204 | | | |
| 19 | 44 | (Macau) Mak Ka Lok | Liqui Moly Team Engstler | BMW 320 TC | **TC2T** **A** | 2:41.086 | | | |
107% time: 2:36.134 (TC1), 2:44.796 (TC2T)
| – | 77 | (Germany) René Münnich | ALL-INKL.COM Münnich Motorsport | Chevrolet RML Cruze TC1 | **TC1** | 2:37.287 | | | |
| – | 38 | (Hong Kong) William Lok | Campos Racing | SEAT León WTCC | **TC2T** **A** | 2:45.059 | | | |
| – | 19 | (Hong Kong) Henry Kwong | Campos Racing | SEAT León WTCC | **TC2T** **A** | 2:45.110 | | | |
| – | 74 | (Spain) Pepe Oriola | Campos Racing | Chevrolet RML Cruze TC1 | **TC1** | no time set | | | |

- **Bold** denotes Pole position for second race.

=== Race 1 ===
| Pos. | No. | Name | Team | Car | C | Laps | Time/Retired | Grid | Points |
|---|---|---|---|---|---|---|---|---|---|
| 1 | 37 | (Argentina) **José María López** | Citroën Total WTCC | Citroën C-Elysée WTCC | **TC1** | 10 | 24:50.183 | 1 | 25 |
| 2 | 5 | (Hungary) Norbert Michelisz | Zengő Motorsport | Honda Civic WTCC | **TC1** | 10 | +2.741 | 4 | 18 |
| 3 | 2 | (Italy) Gabriele Tarquini | Castrol Honda World Touring Car Team | Honda Civic WTCC | **TC1** | 10 | +3.661 | 6 | 15 |
| 4 | 18 | (Portugal) Tiago Monteiro | Castrol Honda World Touring Car Team | Honda Civic WTCC | **TC1** | 10 | +4.055 | 7 | 12 |
| 5 | 1 | (France) Yvan Muller | Citroën Total WTCC | Citroën C-Elysée WTCC | **TC1** | 10 | +4.589 | 3 | 10 |
| 6 | 9 | (France) Sébastien Loeb | Citroën Total WTCC | Citroën C-Elysée WTCC | **TC1** | 10 | +5.186 | 2 | 8 |
| 7 | 4 | (Netherlands) Tom Coronel | ROAL Motorsport | Chevrolet RML Cruze TC1 | **TC1** | 10 | +9.338 | 5 | 6 |
| 8 | 33 | (China) Ma Qing Hua | Citroën Total WTCC | Citroën C-Elysée WTCC | **TC1** | 10 | +10.008 | 11 | 4 |
| 9 | 12 | (United Kingdom) Robert Huff | Lukoil Lada Sport | Lada Granta 1.6T | **TC1** | 10 | +15.548 | 8 | 2 |
| 10 | 10 | (Italy) Gianni Morbidelli | ALL-INKL.COM Münnich Motorsport | Chevrolet RML Cruze TC1 | **TC1** | 10 | +19.201 | 12 | 1 |
| 11 | 11 | (United Kingdom) James Thompson | Lukoil Lada Sport | Lada Granta 1.6T | **TC1** | 10 | +19.947 | 14 | |
| 12 | 3 | (United Kingdom) Tom Chilton | ROAL Motorsport | Chevrolet RML Cruze TC1 | **TC1** | 10 | +27.894 | 9 | |
| 13 | 14 | (Russia) Mikhail Kozlovskiy | Lukoil Lada Sport | Lada Granta 1.6T | **TC1** | 10 | +52.601 | 15 | |
| 14 | 6 | (Germany) Franz Engstler | Liqui Moly Team Engstler | BMW 320 TC | **TC2T** | 10 | +1:23.715 | 16 | |
| 15 | 77 | (Germany) René Münnich | ALL-INKL.COM Münnich Motorsport | Chevrolet RML Cruze TC1 | **TC1** | 10 | +1:59.115 | 20 | |
| 16 | 27 | (France) John Filippi | Campos Racing | SEAT León WTCC | **TC2T** | 10 | +2:02.667 | 17 | |
| 17 | 26 | (Macau) Felipe De Souza | Liqui Moly Team Engstler | BMW 320 TC | **TC2T** **A** | 10 | +2:04.627 | 18 | |
| 18 | 44 | (Macau) Mak Ka Lok | Liqui Moly Team Engstler | BMW 320 TC | **TC2T** **A** | 9 | +1 Lap | 19 | |
| 19 | 25 | (Morocco) Mehdi Bennani | Proteam Racing | Honda Civic WTCC | **TC1** | 8 | +2 Laps | 13 | |
| NC | 7 | (France) Hugo Valente | Campos Racing | Chevrolet RML Cruze TC1 | **TC1** | 6 | +4 Laps | 10 | |
| Ret | 38 | (Hong Kong) William Lok | Campos Racing | SEAT León WTCC | **TC2T** **A** | 3 | Race incident | 22 | |
| EX^{1} | 19 | (Hong Kong) Henry Kwong | Campos Racing | SEAT León WTCC | **TC2T** **A** | 9 | Excluded | 21 | |
| DNS | 74 | (Spain) Pepe Oriola | Campos Racing | Chevrolet RML Cruze TC1 | **TC1** | 0 | Did not start | – | |

Bold denotes Fastest lap.

^1 — Kwong was excluded for causing the collision with Bennani.

=== Race 2 ===
| Pos. | No. | Name | Team | Car | C | Laps | Time/Retired | Grid | Points |
|---|---|---|---|---|---|---|---|---|---|
| 1 | 12 | (United Kingdom) **Robert Huff** | Lukoil Lada Sport | Lada Granta 1.6T | **TC1** | 11 | 28:21.086 | 3 | 25 |
| 2 | 1 | (France) Yvan Muller | Citroën Total WTCC | Citroën C-Elysée WTCC | **TC1** | 11 | +0.344 | 8 | 18 |
| 3 | 7 | (France) Hugo Valente | Campos Racing | Chevrolet RML Cruze TC1 | **TC1** | 11 | +3.352 | 1 | 15 |
| 4 | 5 | (Hungary) Norbert Michelisz | Zengő Motorsport | Honda Civic WTCC | **TC1** | 11 | +3.990 | 7 | 12 |
| 5 | 37 | (Argentina) José María López | Citroën Total WTCC | Citroën C-Elysée WTCC | **TC1** | 11 | +4.285 | 10 | 10 |
| 6 | 9 | (France) Sébastien Loeb | Citroën Total WTCC | Citroën C-Elysée WTCC | **TC1** | 11 | +4.825 | 9 | 8 |
| 7 | 3 | (United Kingdom) Tom Chilton | ROAL Motorsport | Chevrolet RML Cruze TC1 | **TC1** | 11 | +5.562 | 2 | 6 |
| 8 | 4 | (Netherlands) Tom Coronel | ROAL Motorsport | Chevrolet RML Cruze TC1 | **TC1** | 11 | +6.615 | 6 | 4 |
| 9 | 11 | (United Kingdom) James Thompson | Lukoil Lada Sport | Lada Granta 1.6T | **TC1** | 11 | +8.252 | 14 | 2 |
| 10 | 6 | (Germany) Franz Engstler | Liqui Moly Team Engstler | BMW 320 TC | **TC2T** | 11 | +41.038 | 16 | 1 |
| 11 | 77 | (Germany) René Münnich | ALL-INKL.COM Münnich Motorsport | Chevrolet RML Cruze TC1 | **TC1** | 11 | +1:31.505 | 20 | |
| 12 | 27 | (France) John Filippi | Campos Racing | SEAT León WTCC | **TC2T** | 11 | +1:38.302 | 17 | |
| 13 | 26 | (Macau) Felipe De Souza | Liqui Moly Team Engstler | BMW 320 TC | **TC2T** **A** | 11 | +1:40.310 | 18 | |
| 14 | 44 | (Macau) Mak Ka Lok | Liqui Moly Team Engstler | BMW 320 TC | **TC2T** **A** | 11 | +2:04.022 | 19 | |
| 15 | 19 | (Hong Kong) Henry Kwong | Campos Racing | SEAT León WTCC | **TC2T** **A** | 11 | +2:22.483 | 21 | |
| 16 | 18 | (Portugal) Tiago Monteiro | Castrol Honda World Touring Car Team | Honda Civic WTCC | **TC1** | 10 | +1 Lap | 4 | |
| Ret | 33 | (China) Ma Qing Hua | Citroën Total WTCC | Citroën C-Elysée WTCC | **TC1** | 6 | Race incident | 11 | |
| Ret | 14 | (Russia) Mikhail Kozlovskiy | Lukoil Lada Sport | Lada Granta 1.6T | **TC1** | 6 | Retired | 15 | |
| Ret | 10 | (Italy) Gianni Morbidelli | ALL-INKL.COM Münnich Motorsport | Chevrolet RML Cruze TC1 | **TC1** | 3 | Race incident | 12 | |
| DNS | 2 | (Italy) Gabriele Tarquini | Castrol Honda World Touring Car Team | Honda Civic WTCC | **TC1** | 0 | Did not start | 5 | |
| DNS | 25 | (Morocco) Mehdi Bennani | Proteam Racing | Honda Civic WTCC | **TC1** | 0 | Did not start | 13 | |
| DNS | 38 | (Hong Kong) William Lok | Campos Racing | SEAT León WTCC | **TC2T** **A** | 0 | Did not start | 22 | |
| DNS | 74 | (Spain) Pepe Oriola | Campos Racing | Chevrolet RML Cruze TC1 | **TC1** | 0 | Did not start | – | |

Bold denotes Fastest lap.

== Standings after the event ==
Drivers' Championship standings

| | Pos | Driver | Points |
|---|---|---|---|
| | 1 | (Argentina) José María López | 462 |
| | 2 | (France) Yvan Muller | 336 |
| | 3 | (France) Sébastien Loeb | 295 |
| 1 | 4 | (Hungary) Norbert Michelisz | 201 |
| 1 | 5 | (Portugal) Tiago Monteiro | 186 |

Yokohama Trophy standings

| Pos | Driver | Points |
|---|---|---|
| 1 | (Germany) Franz Engstler | 249 |
| 2 | (France) John Filippi | 159 |
| 3 | (Italy) Pasquale Di Sabatino | 98 |
| 4 | (Macau) Felipe De Souza | 38 |
| 5 | (Argentina) Camilo Echevarría | 12 |

Manufacturers' Championship standings

| Pos | Manufacturer | Points |
|---|---|---|
| 1 | (France) Citroën | 1003 |
| 2 | (Japan) Honda | 710 |
| 3 | (Russia) Lada | 425 |

- Note: Only the top five positions are included for both sets of drivers' standings.
