= FIA GT1 World Championship =

World championship sports car racing series

- The FIA GT1 World Championship logo
- Category: Grand tourer
- Country: International
- Inaugural season: 2010
- Folded: 2012
- Drivers: Appr. 40
- Teams: 9
- Tyre suppliers: Michelin, Pirelli
- Last Drivers' champion: (Germany) Marc Basseng (Germany) Markus Winkelhock
- Last Teams' champion: (Germany) All-Inkl.com Münnich Motorsport
- Official website: www.gt1world.com

The FIA GT1 World Championship was a world championship sports car racing series, developed by the SRO Group and regulated by the Fédération Internationale de l'Automobile (FIA), that was held from 2010 to 2012. It featured multiple grand tourer race cars—based on production road cars and conforming with the GT1 (2010–2011) and GT3 (2012) regulations—that competed in one-hour races on multiple continents. All cars were performance balanced, with weight and restrictor adjustments, to artificially equalise their performance. Championships were awarded each season for drivers and teams.

The FIA GT1 World Championship started in 2010 as a successor to the FIA GT Championship, which had featured the GT1 category as well as a GT2 category. In 2012, the series originally planned to move away from exclusive use of GT1 cars by allowing 2009-spec GT2 cars from the former FIA GT Championship, as well as current performance-balanced GT3 specification cars, to compete alongside the series' GT1 cars. However, as there were no interested GT2 teams and only a handful of former GT1 runners were willing to participate, the SRO Group decided that the 2012 season would be contested with GT3-spec cars only (yet retaining GT1 in the series' title). The series folded after the 2012 season due to the high costs, shrinking car counts, and issues with the calendar, and morphed into the FIA GT Series for 2013.

== Format ==
The FIA GT1 World Championship held races in ten countries, with each event consisting of two races over a weekend. Qualifying involved a knockout racing system similar to Formula One, in which three sessions were held; and, following each session, the slowest cars were eliminated and grid positions set. The first race of each weekend was a qualifying race, the results of which determined the starting grid for a second race awarding full championship points. Each car was required to change tires and drivers at least once during each race. The points system for the series was identical to that adopted by the FIA in 2010 with the top ten finishers in the second race earning points; only the top three finishers in the qualifying race earned points.

The series initially penalized cars that won races with Ballast weight, but that practice was removed for 2012. With the rules changes in 2012, there was no limit to the number of manufacturers in the series. Each manufacturer could only be represented by one team, and each team was required to bring two identical cars to enter the championship; single entries or entries with more than two cars were not allowed. To ensure close competition, each model of car was tested by the FIA to determine any mandatory adjustments (such as extra weight ballasts and restrictor tweaks) for performance balancing. Performance adjustments were also made between races during the season.

To defray costs for individual teams, the SRO provided free transport for cars and equipment as well as airline tickets for ten personnel per team.

== Races ==
The world tour visited three continents: Europe, Asia, and South America. Yas Marina Circuit of the United Arab Emirates represented the series' only Middle East round. South America featured the Potrero de los Funes Circuit in Argentina and Interlagos in Brazil. European races included the Czech Brno Circuit; the British Silverstone Circuit, where the winners were awarded the RAC Tourist Trophy; the French Paul Ricard; Portuguese Autódromo Internacional do Algarve; and Spanish Circuito de Navarra. From 2010 to 2011, Germany's races switched from the Nürburgring to the Sachsenring, while Belgium's races moved from the Circuit de Spa-Francorchamps to the Circuit Zolder. For 2011 the series visited Asia, with a Chinese round at the Ordos International Circuit. Due to the cancellation of the round at Curitiba in 2011, the series elected to visit Goldenport Park Circuit at Beijing shortly after the round at Ordos, with a short exhibition street race afterwards.

== Results ==
Six manufacturers were represented in the inaugural season of FIA GT1, with Chevrolet, Maserati, and Aston Martin retaining the grandfathered Corvette C6. R, MC12, and DBR9 cars they had respectively utilized in the FIA GT series. Ford, Nissan, and Lamborghini all brought new or modified vehicles developed specifically for FIA GT1: the Ford GT1, Nissan GT-R, and Lamborghini Murciélago R-SV.

After the qualifying race on 5 December 2010, the champions of the 2010 season were crowned at the San Luis street circuit in Argentina. Michael Bartels and Andrea Bertolini, three-time FIA GT Champions, clinched the Drivers' Championship while their Vitaphone Racing Team clinched the Teams' Championship. Aston Martin earned the SRO Trophy for Manufacturers. In 2011, the defending champions did not return and Maserati was no longer represented, leaving a field of 18 cars from five manufacturers. The series visited China for the first time, for two rounds. Germans Michael Krumm and Lucas Luhr, of the JR Motorsports team, won the year's Drivers' Championship in the penultimate race of the season, while Hexis AMR (Aston Martin) won the Teams' title in the final race of the year. In 2012 Germans Marc Basseng and Markus Winkelhock, of the All-inkl.com Münnich Motorsport team (Mercedes-Benz), won the year's Drivers' Championship and this team also won the Teams' title.

=== List of FIA GT1 World Champions ===
Season	Driver Champion	Team Champion	Ref
2010	(Germany) Michael Bartels (Italy) Andrea Bertolini	(Germany) Vitaphone Racing Team	
2011	(Germany) Lucas Luhr (Germany) Michael Krumm	(France) Hexis AMR	
2012	(Germany) Marc Basseng (Germany) Markus Winkelhock	(Germany) All-Inkl.com Münnich Motorsport	

== Circuits ==
- (Portugal) Algarve International Circuit (2010–2012)
- Automotodróm Slovakia Ring (2012)
- (Czech Republic) Brno Circuit (2010)
- (Belgium) Circuit de Spa-Francorchamps (2010)
- (France) Circuit Paul Armagnac (2012)
- (France) Circuit Paul Ricard (2010–2011)
- (Belgium) Circuit Zolder (2011–2012)
- (Spain) Circuito de Navarra (2010–2012)
- (United Kingdom) Donington Park (2012)
- (China) Goldenport Park Circuit (2011)
- (Brazil) Interlagos Circuit (2010)
- (Russia) Moscow Raceway (2012)
- (Germany) Nürburgring (2010, 2012)
- (China) Ordos International Circuit (2011)
- (Argentina) Potrero de los Funes Circuit (2010–2011)
- (Germany) Sachsenring (2011)
- (United Kingdom) Silverstone Circuit (2010–2011)
- (United Arab Emirates) Yas Marina Circuit (2010–2011)

== See also ==
- Blancpain Sprint Series
- FIA GT3 European Championship
- GT4 European Cup
