= 2014 FIA WTCC Race of Argentina =

Race details
- Round 8 of 12 in the 2014 World Touring Car Championship at Autódromo Termas de Río Hondo in Termas de Río Hondo, Argentina.
- Date: 3 August, 2014
- Location: Termas de Río Hondo, Argentina
- Course: Autódromo Termas de Río Hondo; 4.806 kilometres (2.986 mi)

Race One
- Laps: 13
Pole position
Driver		(Argentina) José María López	Citroën Total WTCC
Time		1:43.766	
Podium
First		(Argentina) José María López	Citroën Total WTCC
Second		(Hungary) Norbert Michelisz	Zengő Motorsport
Third		(France) Yvan Muller	Citroën Total WTCC
Fastest Lap
Driver		(Argentina) José María López	Citroën Total WTCC
Time		1:46.456	

Race Two
- Laps: 13
Podium
First		(Argentina) José María López	Citroën Total WTCC
Second		(United Kingdom) Robert Huff	Lukoil Lada Sport
Third		(France) Yvan Muller	Citroën Total WTCC
Fastest Lap
Driver		(Argentina) José María López	Citroën Total WTCC
Time		1:45.926	

The 2014 FIA WTCC Race of Argentina was the eighth round of the 2014 World Touring Car Championship season and the second running of the FIA WTCC Race of Argentina. It was held on 3 August 2014 at the Autódromo Termas de Río Hondo in Termas de Río Hondo, Santiago del Estero Province, Argentina.

Both races were won by José María López driving for Citroën Total WTCC.

== Background ==
José María López led the drivers' championship coming into his home round, thirty–nine points ahead of teammate Yvan Muller. Franz Engstler held the lead of the Yokohama Trophy.

Camilo Echevarría joined Liqui Moly Team Engstler on a one–off basis, replacing Pasquale Di Sabatino. Citroën Total WTCC reverted to three cars with Ma Qing Hua missing the Argentine round.

When the compensation weights were revised after the previous round; the Citroën C-Elysée WTCC retained the maximum ballast to keep their weight at 1,160 kilograms (2,557 lb). The Honda Civic WTCCs retained 20 kilograms (44 lb) of ballast to weigh–in at 1,120 kilograms (2,469 lb) and the Lada Granta 1.6Ts remained at the base weight of 1,100 kilograms (2,425 lb). The Chevrolet RML Cruze TC1s gained 20 kilograms (44 lb) to increase their weight to 1,140 kilograms (2,513 lb).

== Report ==
=== Testing and free practice ===
López was quickest in Friday testing ahead of Muller and the Honda of Gabriele Tarquini.

López stayed on top in free practice one on Saturday. Sébastien Loeb was second with Mehdi Bennani third in the Proteam Racing Honda.

Muller was fastest in the final practice session, morning pacesetter López was second ahead of ROAL Motorsport's Tom Chilton.

=== Qualifying ===
The first part of qualifying saw Norbert Michelisz top the times, while Belgium race two pole sitter Gianni Morbidelli did not make it through to the second part of qualifying and lined up 15th for the races.

López was quickest in the second part of qualifying; his Citroën teammates Muller and Loeb also made it through to the final part of qualifying along with Michelisz and Tiago Monteiro. Robert Huff secured pole on the race two reversed grid in his Lada.

At the end of qualifying López claimed pole position at his home race with Muller and Loeb once again making it a Citroën 1–2–3.

=== Race One ===
Michelisz and Monteiro moved up into second place and third at the start while López retained the lead. At the end of the back straight Muller and Loeb were able to repass Monteiro; Monteiro took back fourth from Loeb before Loeb nudged his way back into the position. On lap five Dušan Borković dropped from 11th to 13th having been passed by James Thompson and Morbidelli while his teammate Hugo Valente pitted with cooling problems. On lap eight Borković suffered a left rear puncture and returned to the pits for repairs. Thompson had been on the tail of Tom Coronel for the final laps and took tenth at the final corner to score his first championship point since the Race of France, the second round of the season. Lopez took victory with Michelisz holding off Muller for second, while Franz Engstler was the winner of the TC2 class.

=== Race Two ===
Huff got away from pole into the lead, Mehdi Bennani jumped up to second place while Valente dropped to fifth and got a light tap from Tarquini at the start. Muller ran wide on the first lap allowing Michelisz and López to get alongside and pass him, dropping him down to ninth. On the second lap López was on the tail of Tom Chilton for fifth place as Chilton was trying to pass Valente. The Campos Racing Chevrolet delayed López's attempt to pass Chilton. On lap five, Bennani began to fall down the order as Gabriele Tarquini, Tiago Monteiro, and Tom Chilton passed him, followed closely by Yvan Muller and José María López, who soon overtook Chilton as well. On lap six, López moved into third place, benefiting from strong straight-line speed on the back straight.

Muller then engaged in a close battle with Chilton, who held onto fifth despite several overtaking attempts. Meanwhile, Gianni Morbidelli was given a drive-through penalty on lap six for an earlier collision with James Thompson, which had caused the Lada driver to spin. López soon advanced to second place and began closing in on Rob Huff, who had led from the start.

By lap eight, Muller had overtaken Chilton, and Sébastien Loeb then attempted to pass the ROAL Motorsport Chevrolet Cruze. The two made contact, sending Chilton off the track at turn 11; he retired on lap ten. On lap nine, López took the lead from Huff at the end of the back straight thanks to his superior speed, ultimately securing his second victory of the day. Huff was second to take Lada's first podium finish in the World Touring Car Championship ahead of Muller in third and Franz Engstler was the victor in the TC2 class once again.

After the race, Borković was excluded from the results when his car was found to be underweight in parc fermé. Echevarría was dropped one place for a controversial overtake on John Filippi.

== Results ==
=== Qualifying ===
Pos.	No.	Name	Team	Car	C	Q1	Q2	Q3	Points
1	37	(Argentina) José María López	Citroën Total WTCC	Citroën C-Elysée WTCC	TC1	1:44.795	1:43.813	1:43.766	**5**
2	1	(France) Yvan Muller	Citroën Total WTCC	Citroën C-Elysée WTCC	TC1	1:44.962	1:44.194	1:44.194	**4**
3	9	(France) Sébastien Loeb	Citroën Total WTCC	Citroën C-Elysée WTCC	TC1	1:45.216	1:44.128	1:44.310	**3**
4	5	(Hungary) Norbert Michelisz	Zengő Motorsport	Honda Civic WTCC	TC1	1:44.696	1:44.474	1:44.408	**2**
5	18	(Portugal) Tiago Monteiro	Castrol Honda World Touring Car Team	Honda Civic WTCC	TC1	1:45.126	1:44.763	1:45.174	**1**
6	3	(United Kingdom) Tom Chilton	ROAL Motorsport	Chevrolet RML Cruze TC1	TC1	1:45.208	1:44.821		
7	2	(Italy) Gabriele Tarquini	Castrol Honda World Touring Car Team	Honda Civic WTCC	TC1	1:45.150	1:45.263		
8	25	(Morocco) Mehdi Bennani	Proteam Racing	Honda Civic WTCC	TC1	1:45.203	1:45.389		
9	7	(France) Hugo Valente	Campos Racing	Chevrolet RML Cruze TC1	TC1	1:45.843	1:45.542		
10	12	(United Kingdom) **Robert Huff**	Lukoil Lada Sport	Lada Granta 1.6T	TC1	1:45.739	1:45.572		
11	4	(Netherlands) Tom Coronel	ROAL Motorsport	Chevrolet RML Cruze TC1	TC1	1:45.610	1:45.696		
12	77	(Germany) René Münnich	ALL-INKL.COM Münnich Motorsport	Chevrolet RML Cruze TC1	TC1	1:45.348	1:45.830		
13	11	(United Kingdom) James Thompson	Lukoil Lada Sport	Lada Granta 1.6T	TC1	1:45.964			
14	98	(Serbia) Dušan Borković	Campos Racing	Chevrolet RML Cruze TC1	TC1	1:46.037			
15	10	(Italy) Gianni Morbidelli	ALL-INKL.COM Münnich Motorsport	Chevrolet RML Cruze TC1	TC1	1:46.068			
16	14	(Russia) Mikhail Kozlovskiy	Lukoil Lada Sport	Lada Granta 1.6T	TC1	1:46.622			
17	6	(Germany) Franz Engstler	Liqui Moly Team Engstler	BMW 320 TC	TC2T	1:50.499			
18	27	(France) John Filippi	Campos Racing	SEAT León WTCC	TC2T	1:51.722			
19	15	(Argentina) Camilo Echevarría	Liqui Moly Team Engstler	BMW 320 TC	TC2T	1:55.658			

- **Bold** denotes Pole position for second race.

=== Race 1 ===
Pos.	No.	Name	Team	Car	C	Laps	Time/Retired	Grid	Points
1	37	(Argentina) José María López	Citroën Total WTCC	Citroën C-Elysée WTCC	TC1	13	23:10.174	1	25
2	5	(Hungary) Norbert Michelisz	Zengő Motorsport	Honda Civic WTCC	TC1	13	+2.526	4	18
3	1	(France) Yvan Muller	Citroën Total WTCC	Citroën C-Elysée WTCC	TC1	13	+3.271	2	15
4	9	(France) Sébastien Loeb	Citroën Total WTCC	Citroën C-Elysée WTCC	TC1	13	+7.613	3	12
5	18	(Portugal) Tiago Monteiro	Castrol Honda World Touring Car Team	Honda Civic WTCC	TC1	13	+8.871	5	10
6	3	(United Kingdom) Tom Chilton	ROAL Motorsport	Chevrolet RML Cruze TC1	TC1	13	+9.508	6	8
7	12	(United Kingdom) Robert Huff	Lukoil Lada Sport	Lada Granta 1.6T	TC1	13	+13.893	10	6
8	2	(Italy) Gabriele Tarquini	Castrol Honda World Touring Car Team	Honda Civic WTCC	TC1	13	+14.494	7	4
9	25	(Morocco) Mehdi Bennani	Proteam Racing	Honda Civic WTCC	TC1	13	+17.929	8	2
10	11	(United Kingdom) James Thompson	Lukoil Lada Sport	Lada Granta 1.6T	TC1	13	+25.133	13	1
11	4	(Netherlands) Tom Coronel	ROAL Motorsport	Chevrolet RML Cruze TC1	TC1	13	+25.272	11	
12	10	(Italy) Gianni Morbidelli	ALL-INKL.COM Münnich Motorsport	Chevrolet RML Cruze TC1	TC1	13	+26.707	15	
13	77	(Germany) René Münnich	ALL-INKL.COM Münnich Motorsport	Chevrolet RML Cruze TC1	TC1	13	+27.483	12	
14	14	(Russia) Mikhail Kozlovskiy	Lukoil Lada Sport	Lada Granta 1.6T	TC1	13	+29.031	16	
15	6	(Germany) Franz Engstler	Liqui Moly Team Engstler	BMW 320 TC	TC2T	13	+1:18.140	17	
16	27	(France) John Filippi	Campos Racing	SEAT León WTCC	TC2T	13	+1:26.442	18	
17	15	(Argentina) Camilo Echevarría	Liqui Moly Team Engstler	BMW 320 TC	TC2T	12	+1 Lap	19	
Ret	98	(Serbia) Dušan Borković	Campos Racing	Chevrolet RML Cruze TC1	TC1	8	Puncture	14	
Ret	7	(France) Hugo Valente	Campos Racing	Chevrolet RML Cruze TC1	TC1	7	Cooling	9	

Bold denotes Fastest lap.

=== Race 2 ===
Pos.	No.	Name	Team	Car	C	Laps	Time/Retired	Grid	Points
1	37	(Argentina) José María López	Citroën Total WTCC	Citroën C-Elysée WTCC	TC1	13	23:16.716	10	25
2	12	(United Kingdom) Robert Huff	Lukoil Lada Sport	Lada Granta 1.6T	TC1	13	+1.863	1	18
3	1	(France) Yvan Muller	Citroën Total WTCC	Citroën C-Elysée WTCC	TC1	13	+2.896	9	15
4	2	(Italy) Gabriele Tarquini	Castrol Honda World Touring Car Team	Honda Civic WTCC	TC1	13	+5.311	4	12
5	18	(Portugal) Tiago Monteiro	Castrol Honda World Touring Car Team	Honda Civic WTCC	TC1	13	+5.893	6	10
6	9	(France) Sébastien Loeb	Citroën Total WTCC	Citroën C-Elysée WTCC	TC1	13	+6.523	8	8
7	5	(Hungary) Norbert Michelisz	Zengő Motorsport	Honda Civic WTCC	TC1	13	+6.978	7	6
8	25	(Morocco) Mehdi Bennani	Proteam Racing	Honda Civic WTCC	TC1	13	+16.464	3	4
9	11	(United Kingdom) James Thompson	Lukoil Lada Sport	Lada Granta 1.6T	TC1	13	+16.810	13	2
10	4	(Netherlands) Tom Coronel	ROAL Motorsport	Chevrolet RML Cruze TC1	TC1	13	+22.790	11	1
11	14	(Russia) Mikhail Kozlovskiy	Lukoil Lada Sport	Lada Granta 1.6T	TC1	13	+23.683	16	
12	77	(Germany) René Münnich	ALL-INKL.COM Münnich Motorsport	Chevrolet RML Cruze TC1	TC1	13	+29.022	12	
13	10	(Italy) Gianni Morbidelli	ALL-INKL.COM Münnich Motorsport	Chevrolet RML Cruze TC1	TC1	13	+38.501	15	
14	6	(Germany) Franz Engstler	Liqui Moly Team Engstler	BMW 320 TC	TC2T	13	+1:06.948	17	
15	27	(France) John Filippi	Campos Racing	SEAT León WTCC	TC2T	12	+1 Lap	18	
16	15	(Argentina) Camilo Echevarría	Liqui Moly Team Engstler	BMW 320 TC	TC2T	13	+1:18.420^{1}	19	
Ret	3	(United Kingdom) Tom Chilton	ROAL Motorsport	Chevrolet RML Cruze TC1	TC1	5	Race incident	5	
Ret	7	(France) Hugo Valente	Campos Racing	Chevrolet RML Cruze TC1	TC1	5	Retired	2	
EX	98	(Serbia) Dušan Borković	Campos Racing	Chevrolet RML Cruze TC1	TC1	13	Excluded	14	

Bold denotes Fastest lap.

^1 — Echevarría received a one–place penalty after the race.

== Standings after the event ==
Drivers' Championship standings

Pos	Driver	Points
1	(Argentina) José María López	310
2	(France) Yvan Muller	250
3	(France) Sébastien Loeb	213
4	(Portugal) Tiago Monteiro	146
5	(Italy) Gabriele Tarquini	121

Yokohama Trophy standings

Pos	Driver	Points
1	(Germany) Franz Engstler	167
2	(Italy) Pasquale Di Sabatino	98
3	(France) John Filippi	93
4	(Argentina) Camilo Echevarría	12
4	(Hungary) Norbert Nagy	12

Manufacturers' Championship standings

Pos	Manufacturer	Points
1	(France) Citroën	686
2	(Japan) Honda	449
3	(Russia) Lada	247

- Note: Only the top five positions are included for both sets of drivers' standings.
