= 2014 FIA WTCC Race of China, Beijing =

Race details
- Round 9 of 12 in the 2014 World Touring Car Championship at Goldenport Park Circuit in Beijing, China.
- Date: 5 October, 2014
- Location: Beijing, China
- Course: Goldenport Park Circuit; 2.391 kilometres (1.486 mi)

Race One
- Laps: 28
Pole position
Driver		(United Kingdom) Tom Chilton	ROAL Motorsport
Time		1:04.321	
Podium
First		(United Kingdom) Tom Chilton	ROAL Motorsport
Second		(France) Yvan Muller	Citroën Total WTCC
Third		(Argentina) José María López	Citroën Total WTCC
Fastest Lap
Driver		(United Kingdom) Tom Chilton	ROAL Motorsport
Time		1:05.382	

Race Two
- Laps: 26
Podium
First		(United Kingdom) Robert Huff	Lada Sport
Second		(Netherlands) Tom Coronel	ROAL Motorsport
Third		(France) Sébastien Loeb	Citroën Total WTCC
Fastest Lap
Driver		(Argentina) José María López	Citroën Total WTCC
Time		1:05:934	

The 2014 FIA WTCC Race of China, Beijing was the ninth round of the 2014 World Touring Car Championship season and the fourth running of the FIA WTCC Race of China. It was the first of two rounds held in China in 2014, the second taking place at the Shanghai International Circuit the following weekend. It was held on 5 October 2014 at the Goldenport Park Circuit in Beijing, China.

Race one was won by Tom Chilton for ROAL Motorsport and race two was won by Robert Huff for Lada Sport, the manufacturer's first victory in the World Touring Car Championship.

== Background ==
José María López led the drivers' championship coming into the round, sixty points ahead of teammate Yvan Muller. Franz Engstler held the lead of the Yokohama Trophy.

The event was a late replacement for the FIA WTCC Race of the United States which was cancelled in June 2014 due to logistical issues. The Beijing race will form half of a Chinese double–header with the originally planned Shanghai race the following weekend.

Felipe De Souza joined Liqui Moly Team Engstler for the remained of the 2014 season, replacing Pasquale Di Sabatino. Michael Soong joined Campos Racing in a TC2T SEAT León and Ma Qing Hua returned to Citroën Total WTCC.

When the compensation weights were revised after the previous round; the Citroën C-Elysée WTCC retained the maximum ballast to keep their weight at 1,160 kilograms (2,557 lb). The Honda Civic WTCCs gained 10 kilograms (22 lb) of ballast to weigh–in at 1,130 kilograms (2,491 lb) and the Chevrolet RML Cruze TC1s lost 20 kilograms (44 lb) to drop their weight to 1,120 kilograms (2,469 lb). The Lada Granta 1.6Ts remained at the base weight of 1,100 kilograms (2,425 lb).

== Report ==
=== Testing and free practice ===
The first test session took place in wet conditions and Tiago Monteiro set the fastest time ahead of López and Robert Huff.

Monteiro was quickest again in the first free practice session with Citroën pair López and Ma Qing Hua second and third. The session ended 40 seconds early when López beached his car in the gravel at turn eight.

Ma set the fastest time in the final free practice session ahead of Huff and Gianni Morbidelli as the sun set, the session was stopped two minutes early due to the deteriorating light conditions.

=== Qualifying ===
Monteiro topped the first part of qualifying which was stopped twice; early on De Souza went off at the last corner and beached his Engstler BMW in the gravel trap. Later on Dušan Borković spun off and damaged his car which was then recovered by the marshals. Franz Engstler qualified 18th to take pole in the TC2T class.

López was fastest in the second part of qualifying while Monteiro finished 11th having led three out of the four sessions so far during the weekend. James Thompson was eighth and his Lada teammate Huff was tenth and therefore took pole for race two with Tom Coronel starting alongside him. López, Muller, Gabriele Tarquini, Morbidelli and Chilton made it through the Q3 shootout with Norbert Michelisz narrowly missing out.

Having been fifth in Q2, Chilton set his time first and it would go unbeaten for the rest of the session. Tarquini was second with the Citroëns of Muller and López ahead of Morbidelli.

=== Race One ===
Chilton got away from pole while Muller jumped ahead of Tarquini to take second. After three laps the safety car came out following a collision between René Münnich and Borković. The race resumed on lap 11 with no immediate change in the order at the front although Tarquini was enduring pressure from López for third place. Michelisz moved up to fifth place at the expense of Sébastien Loeb who had also lost a place to Morbidelli. Monteiro went into the pits at half distance having struggled to get his car around the last lap. At the front Chilton was extending his lead while further back Ma took eighth off Thompson to put himself on the tail of teammate Loeb. On lap 23 Ma went off and dropped behind Thompson, Huff and Mehdi Bennani down to eleventh place. The following lap Tarquini returned to the pits for repairs, as did Coronel, Mikhail Kozlovskiy and Ma. Hugo Valente slowed with a puncture as Chilton claimed his first victory of the season ahead of Muller and López. Franz Engstler took victory in the TC2T class.

=== Race Two ===
Prior to the race Honda had taken Monteiro's car out of parc fermé and he was dropped to the back of the grid for race two. Kozlovskiy was unable to start the race following on from technical issues in race one. Huff started on pole and narrowly beat Coronel into the first corner as Loeb jumped up to third ahead of Thompson who then lost another place to Michelisz. Bennani was given a drive–through penalty for a breach of the start procedure on the second lap. By the third lap Monteiro had moved up to 12th ahead of Ma as further back De Souza spun and recovered. Chilton had moved up to eighth since the start and had passed a struggling Muller, by half distance he was attacking Morbidelli for seventh although he would be unable to make further progress during the race. López had taken fourth place on lap 17 to increase his points haul over Muller, leaving him with ten laps to close the three second gap to Loeb who was still running third. In the final laps Coronel began closing in on race leader Huff while López had more than halved the gap to Loeb. Huff claimed the first WTCC victory for Lada, Coronel finished second while Loeb and Lopez were neck–and–neck to the line with Loeb claiming the final podium spot by three-hundredths of a second ahead. Franz Engstler claimed the TC2T class victory once again.

== Results ==
=== Qualifying ===
Pos.	No.	Name	Team	Car	C	Q1	Q2	Q3	Points
1	3	(United Kingdom) Tom Chilton	ROAL Motorsport	Chevrolet RML Cruze TC1	**TC1**	1:04.887	1:04.524	1:04.321	**5**
2	2	(Italy) Gabriele Tarquini	Castrol Honda World Touring Car Team	Honda Civic WTCC	**TC1**	1:05.177	1:04.373	1:04.353	**4**
3	1	(France) Yvan Muller	Citroën Total WTCC	Citroën C-Elysée WTCC	**TC1**	1:04.953	1:04.356	1:04.411	**3**
4	37	(Argentina) José María López	Citroën Total WTCC	Citroën C-Elysée WTCC	**TC1**	1:05.166	1:04.081	1:04.776	**2**
5	10	(Italy) Gianni Morbidelli	ALL-INKL.COM Münnich Motorsport	Chevrolet RML Cruze TC1	**TC1**	1:05.316	1:04.486	1:04.840	**1**
6	5	(Hungary) Norbert Michelisz	Zengő Motorsport	Honda Civic WTCC	**TC1**	1:05.017	1:04.788		
7	9	(France) Sébastien Loeb	Citroën Total WTCC	Citroën C-Elysée WTCC	**TC1**	1:04.972	1:04.872		
8	11	(United Kingdom) James Thompson	Lukoil Lada Sport	Lada Granta 1.6T	**TC1**	1:05.553	1:04.937		
9	4	(Netherlands) Tom Coronel	ROAL Motorsport	Chevrolet RML Cruze TC1	**TC1**	1:05.574	1:04.937		
10	12	(United Kingdom) **Robert Huff**	Lukoil Lada Sport	Lada Granta 1.6T	**TC1**	1:05.588	1:05.019		
11	18	(Portugal) Tiago Monteiro	Castrol Honda World Touring Car Team	Honda Civic WTCC	**TC1**	1:04.884	1:05.152		
12	7	(France) Hugo Valente	Campos Racing	Chevrolet RML Cruze TC1	**TC1**	1:05.440	1:05.428		
13	25	(Morocco) Mehdi Bennani	Proteam Racing	Honda Civic WTCC	**TC1**	1:05.663			
14	33	(China) Ma Qing Hua	Citroën Total WTCC	Citroën C-Elysée WTCC	**TC1**	1:05.874			
15	14	(Russia) Mikhail Kozlovskiy	Lukoil Lada Sport	Lada Granta 1.6T	**TC1**	1:06.069			
16	98	(Serbia) Dušan Borković	Campos Racing	Chevrolet RML Cruze TC1	**TC1**	1:06.147			
17	77	(Germany) René Münnich	ALL-INKL.COM Münnich Motorsport	Chevrolet RML Cruze TC1	**TC1**	1:06.210			
18	6	(Germany) Franz Engstler	Liqui Moly Team Engstler	BMW 320 TC	**TC2T**	1:08.028			
19	27	(France) John Filippi	Campos Racing	SEAT León WTCC	**TC2T**	1:08.693			
20	80	(Hong Kong) Michael Soong	Campos Racing	SEAT León WTCC	**TC2T** **A**	1:11.443			
107% time: 1:12.789 (TC2T)
–	26	(Macau) Felipe De Souza	Liqui Moly Team Engstler	BMW 320 TC	**TC2T** **A**	no time set			

- **Bold** denotes Pole position for second race.

=== Race 1 ===
Pos.	No.	Name	Team	Car	C	Laps	Time/Retired	Grid	Points
1	3	(United Kingdom) **Tom Chilton**	ROAL Motorsport	Chevrolet RML Cruze TC1	**TC1**	28	35:44.890	1	25
2	1	(France) Yvan Muller	Citroën Total WTCC	Citroën C-Elysée WTCC	**TC1**	28	+2.493	3	18
3	37	(Argentina) José María López	Citroën Total WTCC	Citroën C-Elysée WTCC	**TC1**	28	+5.132	4	15
4	10	(Italy) Gianni Morbidelli	ALL-INKL.COM Münnich Motorsport	Chevrolet RML Cruze TC1	**TC1**	28	+10.473	5	12
5	9	(France) Sébastien Loeb	Citroën Total WTCC	Citroën C-Elysée WTCC	**TC1**	28	+14.455	7	10
6	5	(Hungary) Norbert Michelisz	Zengő Motorsport	Honda Civic WTCC	**TC1**	28	+17.238	6	8
7	11	(United Kingdom) James Thompson	Lukoil Lada Sport	Lada Granta 1.6T	**TC1**	28	+18.338	8	6
8	12	(United Kingdom) Robert Huff	Lukoil Lada Sport	Lada Granta 1.6T	**TC1**	28	+19.104	10	4
9	25	(Morocco) Mehdi Bennani	Proteam Racing	Honda Civic WTCC	**TC1**	28	+37.966	13	2
10	6	(Germany) Franz Engstler	Liqui Moly Team Engstler	BMW 320 TC	**TC2T**	28	+54.871	18	1
11	14	(Russia) Mikhail Kozlovskiy	Lukoil Lada Sport	Lada Granta 1.6T	**TC1**	27	+1 Lap	15	
12	7	(France) Hugo Valente	Campos Racing	Chevrolet RML Cruze TC1	**TC1**	27	+1 Lap	12	
13	27	(France) John Filippi	Campos Racing	SEAT León WTCC	**TC2T**	26	+2 Laps	19	
14	26	(Macau) Felipe De Souza	Liqui Moly Team Engstler	BMW 320 TC	**TC2T** **A**	25	+3 Laps	20	
15	33	(China) Ma Qing Hua	Citroën Total WTCC	Citroën C-Elysée WTCC	**TC1**	24	+4 Laps	14	
16	2	(Italy) Gabriele Tarquini	Castrol Honda World Touring Car Team	Honda Civic WTCC	**TC1**	24	+4 Laps	2	
17	4	(Netherlands) Tom Coronel	ROAL Motorsport	Chevrolet RML Cruze TC1	**TC1**	22	+6 Laps	9	
Ret	18	(Portugal) Tiago Monteiro	Castrol Honda World Touring Car Team	Honda Civic WTCC	**TC1**	13	Race incident	11	
Ret	98	(Serbia) Dušan Borković	Campos Racing	Chevrolet RML Cruze TC1	**TC1**	1	Race incident	16	
Ret	77	(Germany) René Münnich	ALL-INKL.COM Münnich Motorsport	Chevrolet RML Cruze TC1	**TC1**	1	Race incident	17	
DNS	80	(Hong Kong) Michael Soong	Campos Racing	SEAT León WTCC	**TC2T** **A**	0	Did not start	–	

Bold denotes Fastest lap.

=== Race 2 ===
Pos.	No.	Name	Team	Car	C	Laps	Time/Retired	Grid	Points
1	12	(United Kingdom) Robert Huff	Lukoil Lada Sport	Lada Granta 1.6T	**TC1**	26	28:52.502	1	25
2	4	(Netherlands) Tom Coronel	ROAL Motorsport	Chevrolet RML Cruze TC1	**TC1**	26	+0.766	2	18
3	9	(France) Sébastien Loeb	Citroën Total WTCC	Citroën C-Elysée WTCC	**TC1**	26	+3.072	4	15
4	37	(Argentina) **José María López**	Citroën Total WTCC	Citroën C-Elysée WTCC	**TC1**	26	+3.102	7	12
5	5	(Hungary) Norbert Michelisz	Zengő Motorsport	Honda Civic WTCC	**TC1**	26	+8.673	5	10
6	11	(United Kingdom) James Thompson	Lukoil Lada Sport	Lada Granta 1.6T	**TC1**	26	+9.938	3	8
7	10	(Italy) Gianni Morbidelli	ALL-INKL.COM Münnich Motorsport	Chevrolet RML Cruze TC1	**TC1**	26	+11.111	6	6
8	3	(United Kingdom) Tom Chilton	ROAL Motorsport	Chevrolet RML Cruze TC1	**TC1**	26	+11.553	10	4
9	1	(France) Yvan Muller	Citroën Total WTCC	Citroën C-Elysée WTCC	**TC1**	26	+12.463	8	2
10	2	(Italy) Gabriele Tarquini	Castrol Honda World Touring Car Team	Honda Civic WTCC	**TC1**	26	+12.805	9	1
11	7	(France) Hugo Valente	Campos Racing	Chevrolet RML Cruze TC1	**TC1**	26	+19.571	11	
12	33	(China) Ma Qing Hua	Citroën Total WTCC	Citroën C-Elysée WTCC	**TC1**	26	+21.714	13	
13	18	(Portugal) Tiago Monteiro	Castrol Honda World Touring Car Team	Honda Civic WTCC	**TC1**	26	+24.261	18	
14	6	(Germany) Franz Engstler	Liqui Moly Team Engstler	BMW 320 TC	**TC2T**	25	+1 Lap	15	
15	27	(France) John Filippi	Campos Racing	SEAT León WTCC	**TC2T**	25	+1 Lap	16	
Ret	25	(Morocco) Mehdi Bennani	Proteam Racing	Honda Civic WTCC	**TC1**	6	Retired	12	
Ret	26	(Macau) Felipe De Souza	Liqui Moly Team Engstler	BMW 320 TC	**TC2T** **A**	2	Retired	17	
DNS	14	(Russia) Mikhail Kozlovskiy	Lukoil Lada Sport	Lada Granta 1.6T	**TC1**	0	Did not start	14	
DNS	98	(Serbia) Dušan Borković	Campos Racing	Chevrolet RML Cruze TC1	**TC1**	0	Did not start	19	
DNS	77	(Germany) René Münnich	ALL-INKL.COM Münnich Motorsport	Chevrolet RML Cruze TC1	**TC1**	0	Did not start	–	
DNS	80	(Hong Kong) Michael Soong	Campos Racing	SEAT León WTCC	**TC2T** **A**	0	Did not start	–	

Bold denotes Fastest lap.

== Standings after the event ==
Drivers' Championship standings

Pos	Driver	Points
1	(Argentina) José María López	339
2	(France) Yvan Muller	273
3	(France) Sébastien Loeb	238
4	(Portugal) Tiago Monteiro	146
5	(Italy) Gabriele Tarquini	126

Yokohama Trophy standings

	Pos	Driver	Points
	1	(Germany) Franz Engstler	190
1	2	(France) John Filippi	109
1	3	(Italy) Pasquale Di Sabatino	98
	4	(Argentina) Camilo Echevarría	12
	4	(Hungary) Norbert Nagy	12

Manufacturers' Championship standings

Pos	Manufacturer	Points
1	(France) Citroën	769
2	(Japan) Honda	499
3	(Russia) Lada	305

- Note: Only the top five positions are included for both sets of drivers' standings.
