= 2014 FIA WTCC Race of Russia =

Race details
- Round 6 of 12 in the 2014 World Touring Car Championship at Moscow Raceway in Volokolamsk, Russia.
- Date: 8 June, 2014
- Location: Volokolamsk, Russia
- Course: Moscow Raceway; 3.931 kilometres (2.443 mi)

Race One
- Laps: 16
Pole position
Driver		(Argentina) José María López	Citroën Total WTCC
Time		1:38.651	
Podium
First		(Argentina) José María López	Citroën Total WTCC
Second		(Italy) Gabriele Tarquini	Castrol Honda Team
Third		(France) Sébastien Loeb	Citroën Total WTCC
Fastest Lap
Driver		(Argentina) José María López	Citroën Total WTCC
Time		1:40.148	

Race Two
- Laps: 16
Podium
First		(China) Ma Qing Hua	Citroën Total WTCC
Second		(France) Yvan Muller	Citroën Total WTCC
Third		(Morocco) Mehdi Bennani	Proteam Racing
Fastest Lap
Driver		(France) Hugo Valente	Campos Racing
Time		1:40.742	

The 2014 FIA WTCC Race of Russia (formally the 2014 FIA WTCC Lukoil Race of Russia) was the sixth round of the 2014 World Touring Car Championship season and the second running of the FIA WTCC Race of Russia. It was held on June 8, 2014 at the Moscow Raceway in Volokolamsk, Russia.

Both races were won by Citroën Total WTCC. José María López won race one and Ma Qing Hua won race two. Ma's victory in race two was the first for a Chinese driver in a FIA World Championship race.

== Background ==
López continued to lead the drivers' championship after the first five rounds, forty–one points ahead of his teammates and defending champion Yvan Muller. Franz Engstler held the lead of the Yokohama Trophy.

Citroën Total WTCC expanded to four cars for the Russian round with Chinese driver Ma Qing Hua joining the team. Campos Racing added a second TC2T SEAT for WTCC débutant Nikita Misiulia.

The compensation weights were changed after the previous round. The Citroën C-Elysée WTCC retained the maximum ballast to keep their weight at 1,160 kilograms (2,557 lb). The Honda Civic WTCCs and Chevrolet RML Cruze TC1s both gained 20 kilograms (44 lb) of ballast to increase their weight to 1,120 kilograms (2,469 lb). The Lada Granta 1.6Ts remained at the base weight of 1,100 kilograms (2,425 lb).

== Report ==
=== Free practice ===
Muller was fastest in the first practice session, Gabriele Tarquini was second for the Castrol Honda World Touring Car Team and Tom Coronel was third in the ROAL Motorsport Chevrolet.

Muller stayed on top in the second practice session, Tarquini was second once again while Hugo Valente was third quickest in the Campos Racing Chevrolet.

=== Qualifying ===
Tarquini set the pace in the first part of qualifying with his teammate Tiago Monteiro second. Coronel just missed out on a place in Q2, ending the session five–hundredths of a second down on Dušan Borković. Robert Huff was the best placed of the Lada drivers in 14th while Gianni Morbidelli was 17th after running wide at turn six and damaging his front splitter. TC2 cars filled the last four positions with Franz Engstler claiming pole position and Misiulia taking the final grid slot.

López led the second part of qualifying ahead of Tarquini, Sébastien Loeb, Tom Chilton and Monteiro. Muller failed to get through to the third session after experiencing oversteer in his Citroën C-Elysée WTCC. Valente ended the session tenth to claim pole position for race two with Ma Qing Hua sharing the front row. Honda privateers Norbert Michelisz and Mehdi Bennani would start race two from the second row.

López went on to claim pole position in the Q3 shootout, Tarquini and Monteiro finished second and third ahead of Loeb and Chilton.

=== Race One ===
Tarquini charged up the inside of López at the start but the Citroën driver hung on around the outside to retain the lead. On the first lap Muller began his recovery from a bad qualifying by taking Chilton for fifth place while his teammate Loeb moved up to third at the expense of Monteiro. At the end of the second lap Borković tried a pass up the inside of Valente at the final corner and collided with the rear of his teammate, putting both drivers out of the race on the spot. The race was run under yellow flags in the final sector for the next two laps while the stricken Chevrolets were removed from the outside of the final corner. Once the yellow flags cleared Chilton retook fifth place off Muller on the pit straight after Muller ran wide at the last corner. Another driver making up after a poor qualifying was Coronel and by lap six he was hassling Michelisz for eighth place before passing him at the last corner on lap eight. In the TC2 class Misiulia passed John Filippi to move up to third in class, he held this position briefly before going off at the final corner on lap nine and putting his SEAT into the tyre barriers. In the final laps of the race there were two battles developing in the top five; Loeb was pursuing Tarquini for second while Muller was chasing Chilton's fourth place. It was on the final lap that Muller completed the pass at the first corner on Chilton by first trying to go around the outside of the Chevrolet and then switching to the inside. López had built up a lead of 3.1 seconds at the finish line and took victory with Tarquini holding off Loeb for second place.

=== Race Two ===
Campos Racing hurried to repair the car of pole sitter Valente during the fifteen minutes of repair time and got the car out three seconds before the pit lane closed. His teammate Borković did not get out in time and started the race from the pitlane. Valente started on pole and Michelisz jumped up ahead of Ma, López failed to get away and was sat on the grid as the rest of the field disappeared around the first corner. There was contact as Muller got turned around the front of Bennani as Loeb and Chilton ran wide to avoid the incident. There was contact between Mikhail Kozlovskiy and James Thompson further back while at the start of the second lap Michelisz was defending from Ma who was looking to take back second place. Race leader Valente was issued with a drive–through penalty for not having his wheel fitted at the five-minute warning before the start of the race; the battle between Michelisz and Ma would now become the battle for the lead. On lap three Loeb lost two places to Coronel and Morbidelli, up ahead Ma and Michelisz continued to battle for the lead with Ma trying a pass on Michelisz on the last corner on lap three and four. Chilton ran wide on lap five and then was tapped from behind by Morbidelli, the two incidents dropped him from fourth to outside the points in eleventh. Lap six saw Muller moving up the order and taking the Hondas of Bennani and Monteiro in one move in the opening part of the lap. Valente went into the pit lane to serve his penalty on lap seven as Ma took the lead of the race from Michelisz. Tarquini went off the circuit and after a brief delay resumed near the back of the field before returning his car to the pits to retire. At the end of lap eight Muller moved up to second with a pass on Michelisz who now had his rear bumper hanging off. On lap 12 the second factory Honda of Monteiro slowed down with technical problems which moved René Münnich up into the final points place. Ma and Muller had built up a gap of six seconds to Michelisz in third who was holding off Bennani, Coronel, Loeb and Chilton. Michelisz lost the back of his car on lap 15 and dropped behind Bennani and Coronel and into the clutches of Loeb at the start of the last lap who was himself under attack from Chilton. Despite slowing down at the finish line Ma secured his first WTCC victory ahead of Muller. Bennani took the final podium place with Coronel fourth and Loeb took fifth from Michelisz with a tap on a rear of the Zengő Motorsport Honda at the last corner.

Following a collision with Chilton during the race, Monteiro was given a five–place grid penalty for the first race in Belgium.

== Results ==
=== Qualifying ===
Pos.	No.	Name	Team	Car	C	Q1	Q2	Q3	Points
1	37	(Argentina) José María López	Citroën Total WTCC	Citroën C-Elysée WTCC	TC1	1:39.560	1:38.832	1:38.651	**5**
2	2	(Italy) Gabriele Tarquini	Castrol Honda World Touring Car Team	Honda Civic WTCC	TC1	1:38.754	1:38.872	1:38.877	**4**
3	18	(Portugal) Tiago Monteiro	Castrol Honda World Touring Car Team	Honda Civic WTCC	TC1	1:39.426	1:39.423	1:39.166	**3**
4	9	(France) Sébastien Loeb	Citroën Total WTCC	Citroën C-Elysée WTCC	TC1	1:40.118	1:39.111	1:39.580	**2**
5	3	(United Kingdom) Tom Chilton	ROAL Motorsport	Chevrolet RML Cruze TC1	TC1	1:39.443	1:39.419	1:39.698	**1**
6	1	(France) Yvan Muller	Citroën Total WTCC	Citroën C-Elysée WTCC	TC1	1:39.953	1:39.575		
7	25	(Morocco) Mehdi Bennani	Proteam Racing	Honda Civic WTCC	TC1	1:40.028	1:39.715		
8	5	(Hungary) Norbert Michelisz	Zengő Motorsport	Honda Civic WTCC	TC1	1:39.848	1:40.001		
9	33	(China) Ma Qing Hua	Citroën Total WTCC	Citroën C-Elysée WTCC	TC1	1:40.280	1:40.092		
10	7	(France) **Hugo Valente**	Campos Racing	Chevrolet RML Cruze TC1	TC1	1:39.914	1:40.312		
11	77	(Germany) René Münnich	ALL-INKL.COM Münnich Motorsport	Chevrolet RML Cruze TC1	TC1	1:40.240	1:40.368		
12	98	(Serbia) Dušan Borković	Campos Racing	Chevrolet RML Cruze TC1	TC1	1:40.288	no time set		
13	4	(Netherlands) Tom Coronel	ROAL Motorsport	Chevrolet RML Cruze TC1	TC1	1:40.327			
14	12	(United Kingdom) Robert Huff	Lukoil Lada Sport	Lada Granta 1.6T	TC1	1:40.639			
15	14	(Russia) Mikhail Kozlovskiy	Lukoil Lada Sport	Lada Granta 1.6T	TC1	1:40.653			
16	11	(United Kingdom) James Thompson	Lukoil Lada Sport	Lada Granta 1.6T	TC1	1:40.655			
17	10	(Italy) Gianni Morbidelli	ALL-INKL.COM Münnich Motorsport	Chevrolet RML Cruze TC1	TC1	1:42.091			
18	6	(Germany) Franz Engstler	Liqui Moly Team Engstler	BMW 320 TC	TC2T	1:44.011			
19	8	(Italy) Pasquale Di Sabatino	Liqui Moly Team Engstler	BMW 320 TC	TC2T	1:44.229			
20	27	(France) John Filippi	Campos Racing	SEAT León WTCC	TC2T	1:46.467			
21	50	(Russia) Nikita Misiulia	Campos Racing	SEAT León WTCC	TC2T	1:46.498			

- **Bold** denotes Pole position for second race.

=== Race 1 ===
Pos.	No.	Name	Team	Car	C	Laps	Time/Retired	Grid	Points
1	37	(Argentina) **José María López**	Citroën Total WTCC	Citroën C-Elysée WTCC	TC1	16	27:05.120	1	25
2	2	(Italy) Gabriele Tarquini	Castrol Honda World Touring Car Team	Honda Civic WTCC	TC1	16	+3.170	2	18
3	9	(France) Sébastien Loeb	Citroën Total WTCC	Citroën C-Elysée WTCC	TC1	16	+3.425	4	15
4	1	(France) Yvan Muller	Citroën Total WTCC	Citroën C-Elysée WTCC	TC1	16	+5.902	6	12
5	3	(United Kingdom) Tom Chilton	ROAL Motorsport	Chevrolet RML Cruze TC1	TC1	16	+6.816	5	10
6	33	(China) Ma Qing Hua	Citroën Total WTCC	Citroën C-Elysée WTCC	TC1	16	+7.505	9	8
7	18	(Portugal) Tiago Monteiro	Castrol Honda World Touring Car Team	Honda Civic WTCC	TC1	16	+13.099	3	6
8	4	(Netherlands) Tom Coronel	ROAL Motorsport	Chevrolet RML Cruze TC1	TC1	16	+15.061	13	4
9	5	(Hungary) Norbert Michelisz	Zengő Motorsport	Honda Civic WTCC	TC1	16	+24.766	8	2
10	12	(United Kingdom) Robert Huff	Lukoil Lada Sport	Lada Granta 1.6T	TC1	16	+27.754	14	1
11	25	(Morocco) Mehdi Bennani	Proteam Racing	Honda Civic WTCC	TC1	16	+28.067	7	
12	10	(Italy) Gianni Morbidelli	ALL-INKL.COM Münnich Motorsport	Chevrolet RML Cruze TC1	TC1	16	+28.579	17	
13	77	(Germany) René Münnich	ALL-INKL.COM Münnich Motorsport	Chevrolet RML Cruze TC1	TC1	16	+29.323	11	
14	11	(United Kingdom) James Thompson	Lukoil Lada Sport	Lada Granta 1.6T	TC1	16	+35.188	16	
15	14	(Russia) Mikhail Kozlovskiy	Lukoil Lada Sport	Lada Granta 1.6T	TC1	16	+38.472	15	
16	6	(Germany) Franz Engstler	Liqui Moly Team Engstler	BMW 320 TC	TC2T	16	+1:12.432	18	
17	8	(Italy) Pasquale Di Sabatino	Liqui Moly Team Engstler	BMW 320 TC	TC2T	16	+1:24.023	19	
18	27	(France) John Filippi	Campos Racing	SEAT León WTCC	TC2T	16	+1:37.942	20	
Ret	50	(Russia) Nikita Misiulia	Campos Racing	SEAT León WTCC	TC2T	7	Race incident	21	
Ret	7	(France) Hugo Valente	Campos Racing	Chevrolet RML Cruze TC1	TC1	1	Race incident	10	
Ret	98	(Serbia) Dušan Borković	Campos Racing	Chevrolet RML Cruze TC1	TC1	1	Race incident	12	

Bold denotes Fastest lap.

=== Race 2 ===
Pos.	No.	Name	Team	Car	C	Laps	Time/Retired	Grid	Points
1	33	(China) Ma Qing Hua	Citroën Total WTCC	Citroën C-Elysée WTCC	TC1	16	27:11.310	2	25
2	1	(France) Yvan Muller	Citroën Total WTCC	Citroën C-Elysée WTCC	TC1	16	+1.261	5	18
3	25	(Morocco) Mehdi Bennani	Proteam Racing	Honda Civic WTCC	TC1	16	+12.252	4	15
4	4	(Netherlands) Tom Coronel	ROAL Motorsport	Chevrolet RML Cruze TC1	TC1	16	+12.424	13	12
5	9	(France) Sébastien Loeb	Citroën Total WTCC	Citroën C-Elysée WTCC	TC1	16	+14.725	7	10
6	3	(United Kingdom) Tom Chilton	ROAL Motorsport	Chevrolet RML Cruze TC1	TC1	16	+14.890	6	8
7	5	(Hungary) Norbert Michelisz	Zengő Motorsport	Honda Civic WTCC	TC1	16	+15.118	3	6
8	10	(Italy) Gianni Morbidelli	ALL-INKL.COM Münnich Motorsport	Chevrolet RML Cruze TC1	TC1	16	+19.894	17	4
9	7	(France) **Hugo Valente**	Campos Racing	Chevrolet RML Cruze TC1	TC1	16	+20.157	1	2
10	77	(Germany) René Münnich	ALL-INKL.COM Münnich Motorsport	Chevrolet RML Cruze TC1	TC1	16	+20.984	11	1
11	98	(Serbia) Dušan Borković	Campos Racing	Chevrolet RML Cruze TC1	TC1	16	+26.813	12^{1}	
12	11	(United Kingdom) James Thompson	Lukoil Lada Sport	Lada Granta 1.6T	TC1	16	+31.686	16	
13	6	(Germany) Franz Engstler	Liqui Moly Team Engstler	BMW 320 TC	TC2T	16	+1:03.478	18	
14	8	(Italy) Pasquale Di Sabatino	Liqui Moly Team Engstler	BMW 320 TC	TC2T	16	+1:15.843	19	
15	27	(France) John Filippi	Campos Racing	SEAT León WTCC	TC2T	16	+1:27.553	20	
16	50	(Russia) Nikita Misiulia	Campos Racing	SEAT León WTCC	TC2T	16	+1:35.889	21	
Ret	18	(Portugal) Tiago Monteiro	Castrol Honda World Touring Car Team	Honda Civic WTCC	TC1	11	Electrical	8	
Ret	12	(United Kingdom) Robert Huff	Lukoil Lada Sport	Lada Granta 1.6T	TC1	10	Technical	14	
Ret	2	(Italy) Gabriele Tarquini	Castrol Honda World Touring Car Team	Honda Civic WTCC	TC1	7	Steering	9	
Ret	14	(Russia) Mikhail Kozlovskiy	Lukoil Lada Sport	Lada Granta 1.6T	TC1	0	Race incident	15	
Ret	37	(Argentina) José María López	Citroën Total WTCC	Citroën C-Elysée WTCC	TC1	0	Gearbox	10	

Bold denotes Fastest lap.

^1 — Borković started from the pit lane.

== Standings after the event ==
Drivers' Championship standings

Pos	Driver	Points
1	(Argentina) José María López	209
2	(France) Yvan Muller	168
3	(France) Sébastien Loeb	161
4	(Portugal) Tiago Monteiro	105
5	(Italy) Gabriele Tarquini	96

Yokohama Trophy standings

Pos	Driver	Points
1	(Germany) Franz Engstler	121
2	(Italy) Pasquale Di Sabatino	85
3	(France) John Filippi	64
4	(Czech Republic) Petr Fulín	10
5	(Japan) Yukinori Taniguchi	10

Manufacturers' Championship standings

Pos	Manufacturer	Points
1	(France) Citroën	502
2	(Japan) Honda	333
3	(Russia) Lada	165

- Note: Only the top five positions are included for both sets of drivers' standings.
