= All-inkl.com =

German web hosting service

- Type: Private
- Industry: Internet, SMEs
- Founded: 2000; 26 years ago
- Founder: René Münnich
- Headquarters: Saxony, Germany,
- Key people: René Münnich (Founder & CEO)
- Products: Domain registration, Web hosting, Dedicated hosting
- Owner: Neue Medien Münnich GmbH
- Website: www.all-inkl.com

All-inkl.com is a German web hosting service operated by Neue Medien Münnich GmbH, based in Saxony, Germany.

Since 2006, All-inkl.com has been the principal sponsor of All-inkl.com Racing. The racing team was founded by René Münnich and has competed in the FIA World Touring Car Championship, FIA World Rallycross Championship, and TCR International Series.

Founded in 2000, the company operates data centres with more than 15,000 servers in Dresden and reports hosting more than 1.9 million websites.

== History ==
All-inkl.com was founded under Neue Medien Münnich GmbH by René Münnich in Saxony, in 2000. The company is run by founder and CEO René Münnich.

In 2004, the trade magazine PC Professionell (issue 11/2004) ranked All-inkl.com first in a comparative test of web hosting packages with advanced features.

All-inkl.com placed second in the 2017 CHIP hotline test with a score of 88.9 out of 100, and third in the 2018 test with a score of 92.6. In a 2015 c't comparative review of managed servers, All-inkl.com was among six providers tested.

In 2015, 2016–2018, and 2025, All-inkl.com was listed as "Webhoster des Jahres" ("Web Host of the Year") by Hosttest.de.

== Sponsorship ==
Since 2006, All-inkl.com has been the principal sponsor of Münnich Motorsport, also known as All-inkl.com Racing. The racing team was founded by René Münnich and has competed in the FIA World Touring Car Championship, FIA World Rallycross Championship, and TCR International Series.

In 2018, the company signed a sponsorship partnership with German football club Dynamo Dresden. In 2024, the partnership was extended until 2028.

The company has supported the Viessmann Luge World Cup in Altenberg since 2009. Since 2022, the company has sponsored the bobsled team led by Francesco Friedrich. In 2010, the company also supported Friedrich's junior bobsleigh team.

Since 2023, All-inkl.com has been a sponsor of professional darts player Michael van Gerwen, the three-time PDC World Champion.

== Operations ==
The company operates data centres with more than 15,000 servers in Dresden, Germany, and reports hosting more than 1.9 million websites. All-inkl.com servers use Intel Core and Intel Xeon processors and are connected via 1 Gbit/s network connections. All-inkl.com reports that its data centre infrastructure is entirely powered by hydroelectric energy, with certification from TÜV SÜD.
