= Münnich Motorsport =

German auto racing team

(Germany) Münnich Motorsport
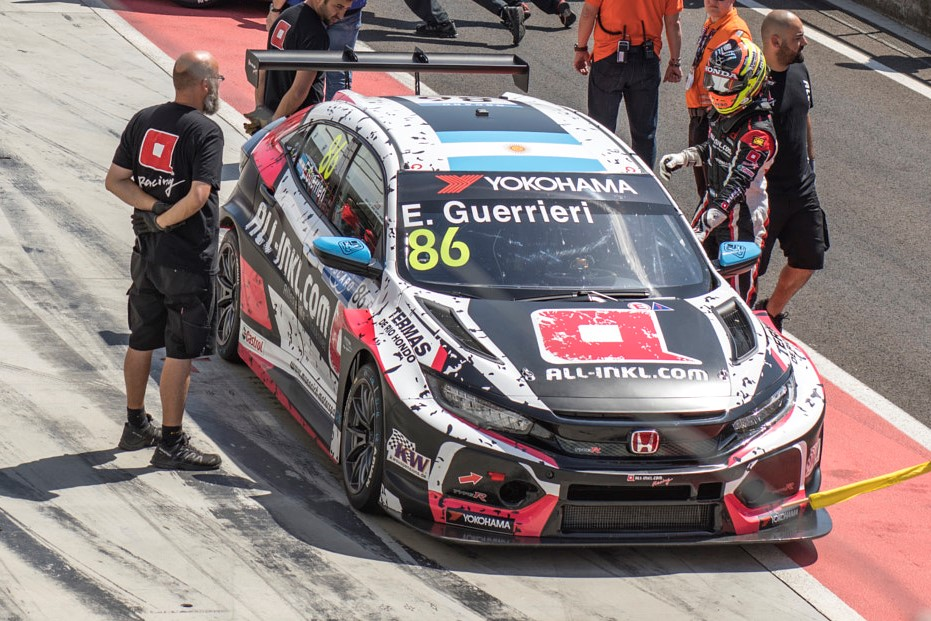
- Founded: 2006
- Team principal(s): René Münnich
- Current series: WTCR; German Rallycross Championship; FIA World Rallycross Championship; FIA European Rallycross Championship
- Former series: WTCC; FIA GT1 World Championship; FIA GT Championship; ADAC GT Masters; FFSA GT Championship
- Current drivers: (Germany) Mandie August (Germany) René Münnich (Argentina) Esteban Guerrieri (Argentina) Néstor Girolami
- Teams' Championships: 2012 FIA GT1
- Drivers' Championships: 2012 FIA GT1 (Basseng/Winkelhock)

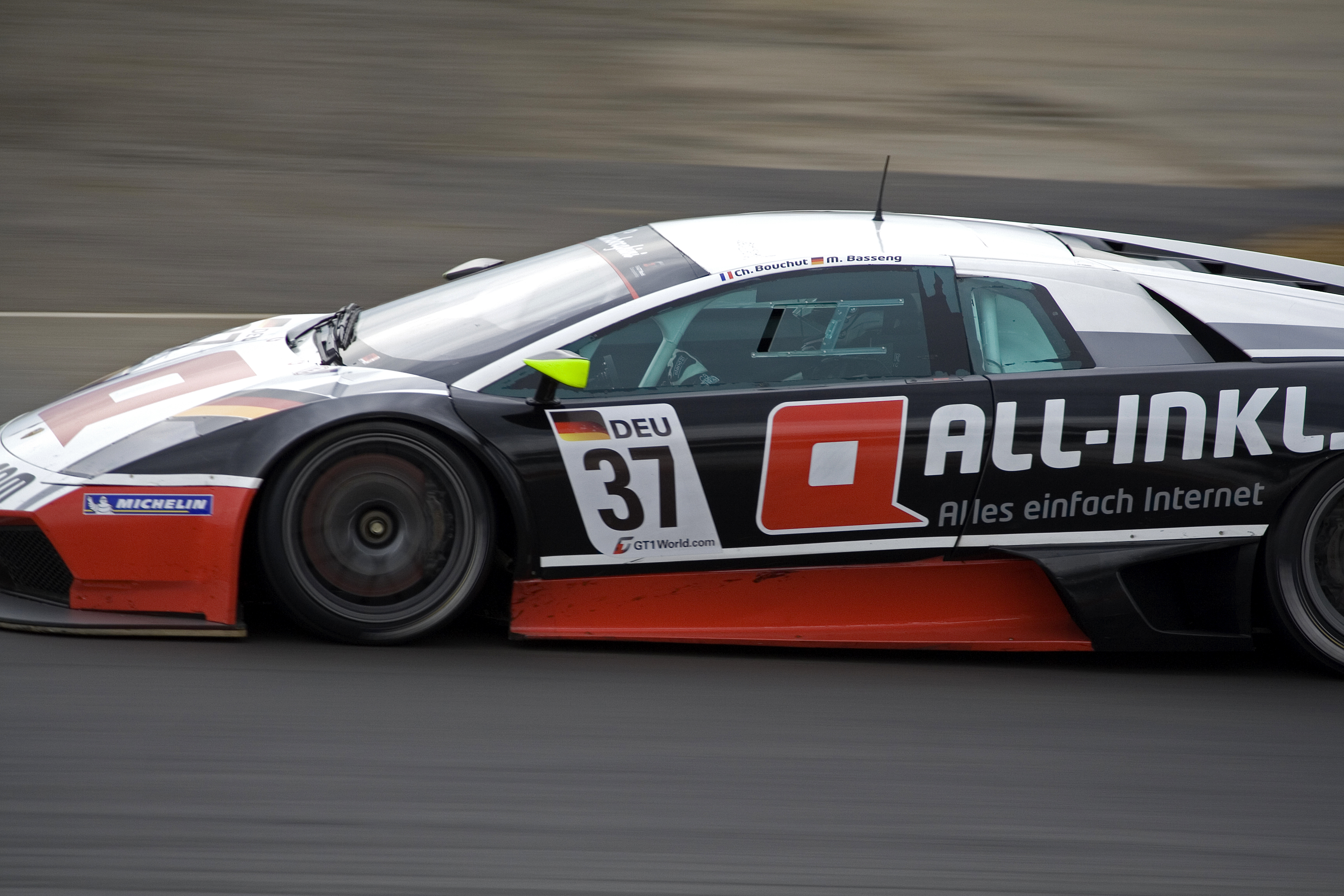
A Münnich Motorsport Lamborghini Murciélago LP670 R-SV competing in the 2010 FIA GT1 World Championship.

Münnich Motorsport GmbH, which also competes under the title All-Inkl.com Racing, is an auto racing team founded by German racing driver and entrepreneur René Münnich in 2006. The team has been built around three areas of motorsport since its inception, sports car racing, rallycross and touring car racing, although in recent years it has focussed on the latter two. The team is backed by Münnich's personal business, domain registrar and web host All-inkl.com.

The team currently competes in the World Touring Car Cup and the FIA World Rallycross Championship.

== Rallycross ==
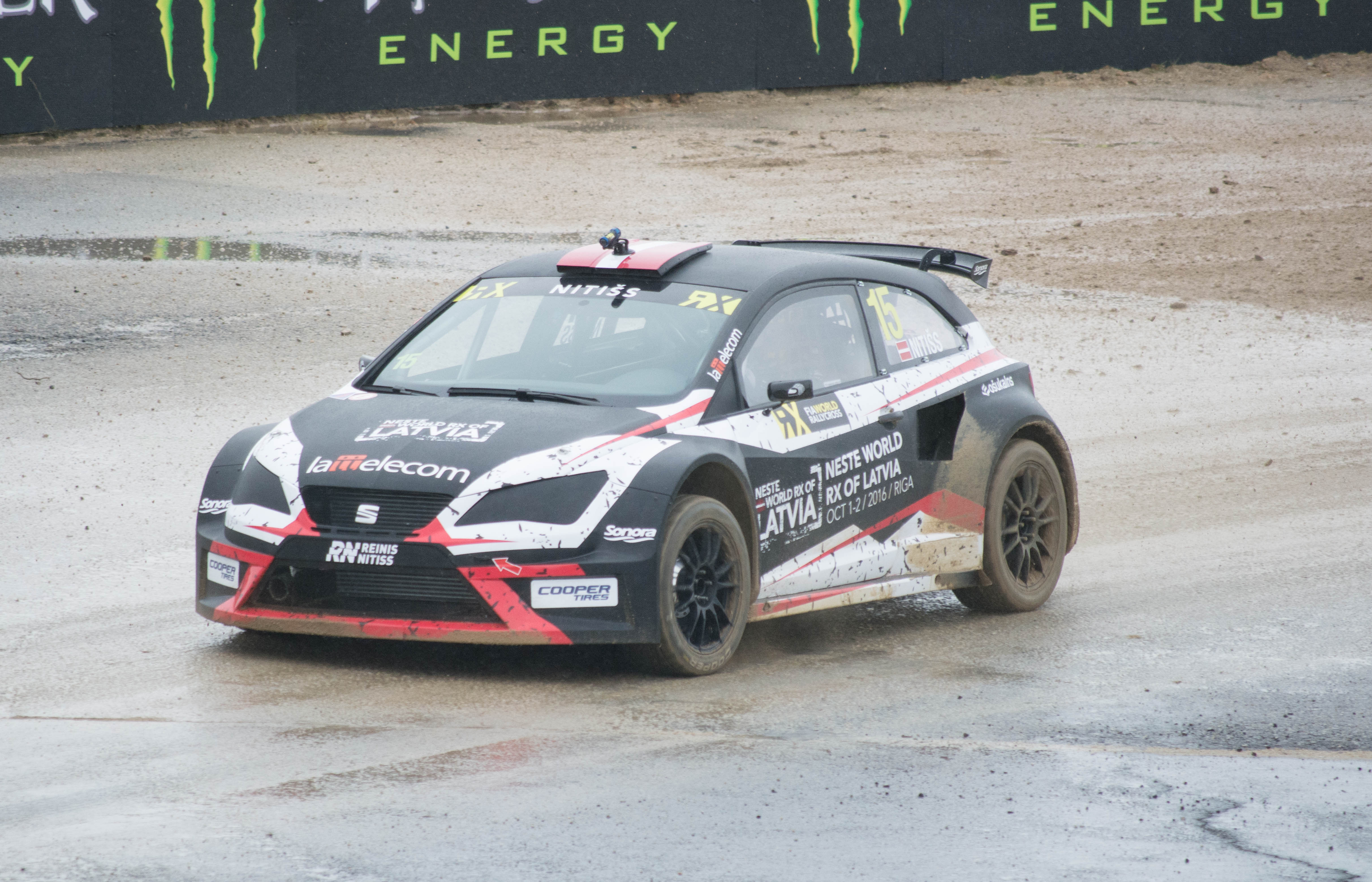
Reinis Nitišs driving the SEAT Ibiza Supercar.

Although the team previously competed in the FIA European Championships for Rallycross Drivers, their current rallycross efforts involve the World Rallycross Championship with a SEAT Ibiza.

In February 2015 it was announced that Münnich Motorsport would be joining the FIA World Rallycross Championship with a self-developed Audi S3. In 2016 they switched to the SEAT Ibiza.

== Sportscars ==
Münnich's sports car efforts have been at the behest of Lamborghini, previously competing in the FIA GT Championship during the 2006 and 2007 seasons with a Murciélago before switching to the German ADAC GT Masters with a Gallardo. Münnich returned to Lamborghini for 2010 by entering the new Murciélago LP670 SV in the inaugural FIA GT1 World Championship, employing experienced sports car drivers Marc Basseng, Thomas Jäger, Christophe Bouchut, Dominik Schwager, and Nicky Pastorelli.

== World Touring Car Championship ==
=== SEAT León WTCC (2013) ===
After the demise of the FIA GT1 World Championship, Münnich Motorsport made the decision to enter the World Touring Car Championship. The team ran three cars for René Münnich, Marc Basseng and Markus Winkelhock. Winkelhock left the team in February 2013 and was replaced by defending champion Robert Huff who moved from Chevrolet. Münnich was the team's only driver eligible for the Yokohama Independent Drivers' Trophy with both Huff and Basseng being reigning champions in the WTCC at the FIA GT1 World Championship respectively.

=== Chevrolet RML Cruze TC1 (2014–2016) ===
In 2014 Münich Motorsport competed in the WTCC races using a brace of Chevrolet RML Cruze TC1 cars. Gianni Morbidelli ended 9th in the driver standings with 109 points and René Münnich ended 19th with 3 points.

=== Citroën C-Elysée WTCC (2017) ===
For what would turn out to be the final year of the WTCC the team ran a sole Citroën C-Elysée WTCC for 2012 champion Rob Huff. Despite expecting to be outright title contenders, Huff didn't win a race until the penultimate meeting of the year.

== Racing record ==
=== World Touring Car Championship results ===
(key) (Races in bold indicate pole position) (Races in italics indicate fastest lap)

Year	Team	Car	No.	Driver	1	2	3	4	5	6	7	8	9	10	11	12	13	14	15	16	17	18	19	20	21	22	23	24	DC	Points
2013	All-Inkl.com Münnich Motorsport	SEAT León WTCC	1	(United Kingdom) Robert Huff	ITA; 1; 6	ITA; 2; 10	MAR; 1; 5	MAR; 2 Ret	SVK; 1; 17	SVK; 2; 4	HUN; 1; 4	HUN; 2; 1	AUT; 1; 8	AUT; 2; 9	RUS; 1; 4	RUS; 2; 3	POR; 1; 5	POR; 2; 2	ARG; 1; 8	ARG; 2 Ret	USA; 1; 8	USA; 2; 20†	JPN; 1; 7	JPN; 2; 8	CHN; 1; 6	CHN; 2; 4	MAC; 1; 3	MAC; 2; 1	4th	215
2013	All-Inkl.com Münnich Motorsport	SEAT León WTCC	37	(Germany) René Münnich	ITA; 1; 16	ITA; 2; 21	MAR; 1; 15	MAR; 2 Ret	SVK; 1; 21	SVK; 2; 19	HUN; 1; 18	HUN; 2; 21	AUT; 1; 17	AUT; 2; 18	RUS; 1; 16	RUS; 2; 19	POR; 1 Ret	POR; 2 Ret	ARG; 1; 18	ARG; 2; 17	USA; 1; 22	USA; 2; 19	JPN; 1; 16	JPN; 2; 14	CHN; 1; 18	CHN; 2; 22	MAC; 1; 16	MAC; 2 Ret	NC	0
2013	All-Inkl.com Münnich Motorsport	SEAT León WTCC	38	(Germany) Marc Basseng	ITA; 1; 14	ITA; 2; 4	MAR; 1; 7	MAR; 2; 5	SVK; 1; 16	SVK; 2; 15	HUN; 1; 11	HUN; 2; 17	AUT; 1 Ret	AUT; 2; 11	RUS; 1; 18	RUS; 2; 13	POR; 1; 10	POR; 2; 5	ARG; 1; 12	ARG; 2 Ret	USA; 1; 9	USA; 2; 9	JPN; 1; 9	JPN; 2; 17	CHN; 1; 15	CHN; 2; 18	MAC; 1; 7	MAC; 2; 7	13th	57
2014	All-Inkl.com Münnich Motorsport	Chevrolet RML Cruze TC1	10	(Italy) Gianni Morbidelli	MAR; 1; 15	MAR; 2; 6	FRA; 1; 11	FRA; 2; 9	HUN; 1; 9	HUN; 2; 1	SVK; 1; 6	SVK; 2 C	AUT; 1; 10	AUT; 2; 6	RUS; 1; 12	RUS; 2; 8	BEL; 1; 4	**BEL**; **2**; 6	ARG; 1; 12	ARG; 2; 14	BEI; 1; 4	BEI; 2; 7	CHN; 1; 11	CHN; 2; 13	JPN; 1; 10	JPN; 2; 8	MAC; 1; 10	MAC; 2 Ret	9th	109
2014	All-Inkl.com Münnich Motorsport	Chevrolet RML Cruze TC1	77	(Germany) René Münnich	MAR; 1 Ret	MAR; 2 Ret	FRA; 1; 12	FRA; 2; 12	HUN; 1; 19	HUN; 2; 13	SVK; 1; 13	SVK; 2 C	AUT; 1; 11	AUT; 2; 9	RUS; 1; 13	RUS; 2; 10	BEL; 1; 15	BEL; 2; 14	ARG; 1; 13	ARG; 2; 12	BEI; 1 Ret	BEI; 2 DNS	CHN; 1; 17†	CHN; 2 Ret	JPN; 1 NC	JPN; 2; 16	MAC; 1; 15	MAC; 2; 11	19th	3
2015	All-Inkl.com Münnich Motorsport	Chevrolet RML Cruze TC1	8	(Germany) Sabine Schmitz	ARG; 1	ARG; 2	MAR; 1	MAR; 2	HUN; 1	HUN; 2	GER; 1; 10	GER; 2; 11	RUS; 1	RUS; 2	SVK; 1	SVK; 2	FRA; 1	FRA; 2	POR; 1	POR; 2	JPN; 1	JPN; 2	CHN; 1	CHN; 2	THA; 1	THA; 2	QAT; 1	QAT; 2	23rd	1
2015	All-Inkl.com Münnich Motorsport	Chevrolet RML Cruze TC1	26	(Italy) Stefano D'Aste	ARG; 1; 9	ARG; 2 Ret	MAR; 1; 9	MAR; 2; 6	HUN; 1; 14	HUN; 2; 12	GER; 1; 8	GER; 2 Ret	RUS; 1; 16	RUS; 2; 14	SVK; 1; 11	SVK; 2; 12	FRA; 1; 14	FRA; 2; 15†	POR; 1; 13	POR; 2 Ret	JPN; 1; 14	JPN; 2; 9	CHN; 1; 9	CHN; 2; 13†	THA; 1; 8	THA; 2; 8	QAT; 1; 17	QAT; 2 Ret	14th	28
2016	All-Inkl.com Münnich Motorsport	Chevrolet RML Cruze TC1	8	(Germany) Sabine Schmitz	FRA; 1	FRA; 2	SVK; 1	SVK; 2	HUN; 1	HUN; 2	MAR; 1	MAR; 2	GER; 1; 10	GER; 2; 11	RUS; 1	RUS; 2	POR; 1	POR; 2	ARG; 1	ARG; 2	JPN; 1	JPN; 2	CHN; 1	CHN; 2	QAT; 1	QAT; 2			22nd	1
2016	All-Inkl.com Münnich Motorsport	Chevrolet RML Cruze TC1	15	(United Kingdom) James Thompson	FRA; 1	FRA; 2	SVK; 1; 16	SVK; 2; 11	HUN; 1	HUN; 2	**MAR**; **1** Ret	MAR; 2; 6	GER; 1	GER; 2	RUS; 1; 8	RUS; 2; 6	POR; 1; 11	POR; 2; 11	ARG; 1; 9	ARG; 2; 11	JPN; 1; 13	JPN; 2; 12	CHN; 1; 12	CHN; 2; 14	QAT; 1; 10	QAT; 2; 10			14th	26
2016	All-Inkl.com Münnich Motorsport	Chevrolet RML Cruze TC1	77	(Germany) René Münnich	FRA; 1; 14	FRA; 2 Ret	SVK; 1	SVK; 2	HUN; 1; 9	HUN; 2; 15	MAR; 1	MAR; 2	GER; 1	GER; 2	RUS; 1	RUS; 2	POR; 1	POR; 2	ARG; 1	ARG; 2	JPN; 1	JPN; 2	CHN; 1	CHN; 2	QAT; 1	QAT; 2			21st	2
2017	ALL-INKL.COM Münnich Motorsport	Citroën C-Elysée WTCC	12	(United Kingdom) Robert Huff	MOR; 1 Ret	MOR; 2; 9	ITA; 1; 2	ITA; 2; 3	HUN; 1; 3	HUN; 2; 10	GER; 1; 3	GER; 2; 3	PRT; 1; 6	PRT; 2; 5	ARG; 1; 7	ARG; 2; 9	CHN; 1 Ret	CHN; 2; 12	JPN; 1; 8	JPN; 2; 11	MAC; 1; 7	MAC; 2; 1	QAT; 1; 7	QAT; 2; 2					7th	215

^{†}Did not finish the race, but was classified as he completed over 90% of the race distance.

=== World Touring Car Championship results ===
(key) (Races in bold indicate pole position) (Races in italics indicate fastest lap)

Year	Team	Car	No.	Driver	1	2	3	4	5	6	7	8	9	10	11	12	13	14	15	16	17	18	19	20	21	22	23	24	25	26	27	28	29	30	DC	Points	Teams	Points
2018	ALL-INKL.COM Münnich Motorsport	Honda Civic Type R TCR (FK8)	15	**(United Kingdom) James Thompson**	MOR; 1; 14	MOR; 2; 6	MOR; 3; 8	HUN; 1; 12	HUN; 2 NC	HUN; 3; 7	GER; 1; 22	GER; 2 DSQ	GER; 3; 19	NLD; 1; 12	NLD; 2; 3	NLD; 3; 9	PRT; 1 Ret	PRT; 2 DNS	PRT; 3 DNS	SVK; 1	SVK; 2	SVK; 3	NIN; 1	NIN; 2	NIN; 3	WUH; 1	WUH; 2	WUH; 3	JPN; 1	JPN; 2	JPN; 3	JPN; 1	JPN; 2	JPN; 3	21st	36	3rd	481
2018	ALL-INKL.COM Münnich Motorsport	Honda Civic Type R TCR (FK8)	42	**(Germany) Timo Scheider**	MOR; 1	MOR; 2	MOR; 3	HUN; 1	HUN; 2	HUN; 3	GER; 1	GER; 2	GER; 3	NLD; 1	NLD; 2	NLD; 3	PRT; 1	PRT; 2	PRT; 3	SVK; 1	SVK; 2	SVK; 3	NIN; 1; 11	NIN; 2; 19	NIN; 3; 11	WUH; 1; 19	WUH; 2 Ret	WUH; 3 Ret	JPN; 1; 19	JPN; 2; 16	JPN; 3; 13	JPN; 1; 8	JPN; 2; 2	JPN; 3 Ret	22nd	24	3rd	481
2018	ALL-INKL.COM Münnich Motorsport	Honda Civic Type R TCR (FK8)	68	**(France) Yann Ehrlacher**	MOR; 1; 7	MOR; 2; 4	MOR; 3; 4	HUN; 1; 1	HUN; 2 Ret	HUN; 3; 4	GER; 1; 19	GER; 2; 6	GER; 3 Ret	NLD; 1; 1	NLD; 2; 2	NLD; 3; 6	PRT; 1 Ret	PRT; 2; 7	PRT; 3; 7	SVK; 1; 6	SVK; 2; 9	SVK; 3; 14	NIN; 1; 8	NIN; 2; 18	NIN; 3; 19	WUH; 1; 18	WUH; 2; 15	WUH; 3; 12	JPN; 1 Ret	JPN; 2; 9	JPN; 3 Ret	JPN; 1; 14	JPN; 2; 6	JPN; 3; 5	10th	204	3rd	481
2018	ALL-INKL.COM Münnich Motorsport	Honda Civic Type R TCR (FK8)	86	**(Argentina) Esteban Guerrieri**	MOR; 1; 6	MOR; 2; 8	MOR; 3; 14	HUN; 1; 2	HUN; 2; 5	HUN; 3; 22	GER; 1 Ret	GER; 2; 1	GER; 3; 8	NLD; 1; 6	NLD; 2; 7	NLD; 3; 4	PRT; 1; 2	PRT; 2 Ret	PRT; 3; 13	SVK; 1 Ret	SVK; 2; 8	SVK; 3 Ret	NIN; 1; 2	NIN; 2; 3	NIN; 3 Ret	WUH; 1; 7	WUH; 2; 13	WUH; 3; 4	JPN; 1; 4	JPN; 2 Ret	JPN; 3; 18	JPN; 1; 6	JPN; 2; 5	JPN; 3; 1	3rd	267	3rd	481

=== Complete FIA World Rallycross Championship results ===
(key)

==== Supercar ====
Year	Entrant	Car	No.	Driver	1	2	3	4	5	6	7	8	9	10	11	12	13	WRX	Points	Teams	Points
2014	All-Inkl.com Münnich Motorsport	Audi S3	49	**(Germany) René Münnich**	POR	GBR	NOR	FIN	SWE; 35	BEL	CAN	FRA	GER; 32	ITA; 25	TUR	ARG		57th	0	N/A	N/A
2015	All-Inkl.com Münnich Motorsport	Audi S3	24	(Norway) **Tommy Rustad**	POR	HOC	BEL	GBR	GER	SWE	CAN; 4	NOR	FRA	BAR	TUR	ITA	ARG	18th	24	8th	29
2015	All-Inkl.com Münnich Motorsport	Audi S3	44	(Germany) **Timo Scheider**	POR	HOC	BEL	GBR	GER	SWE	CAN	NOR	FRA	BAR; 16	TUR	ITA	ARG	34th	1	8th	29
2015	All-Inkl.com Münnich Motorsport	Audi S3	55	(Sweden) **Alx Danielsson**	POR; 21	HOC; 16	BEL; 18	GBR; 29	GER; 16	SWE; 20	CAN	NOR; 4	FRA; 15	BAR; 17	TUR; 19	ITA	ARG	21st	17	8th	29
2015	All-Inkl.com Münnich Motorsport	Audi S3	77	(Germany) **René Münnich**	POR; 20	HOC; 18	BEL; 19	GBR; 26	GER; 12	SWE; 27	CAN; 19	NOR; 21	FRA; 34	BAR	TUR; 12	ITA; 20	ARG; 18	41st	−2	8th	29
2015	All-Inkl.com Münnich Motorsport	Audi S3	110	(Italy) **Gianni Morbidelli**	POR	HOC	BEL	GBR	GER	SWE	CAN	NOR	FRA	BAR	TUR	ITA; 19	ARG; 19	40th	0	8th	29
2016	All-Inkl.com Münnich Motorsport	SEAT Ibiza	15	(Latvia) **Reinis Nitišs**	POR; 15	HOC; 13	BEL; 12	GBR; 21	NOR; 12	SWE; 18	CAN; 13	FRA; 5	BAR; 13†	LAT; 11†	GER	ARG; 10†		16th	44	7th	67
2016	All-Inkl.com Münnich Motorsport	SEAT Ibiza	24	(Norway) **Tommy Rustad**	POR	HOC	BEL	GBR	NOR	SWE	CAN	FRA; 13†	BAR	LAT	GER; 25	ARG		22nd	4	7th	67
2016	All-Inkl.com Münnich Motorsport	SEAT Ibiza	44	(Germany) **Timo Scheider**	POR	HOC	BEL	GBR	NOR	SWE	CAN	FRA	BAR; 17	LAT; 7	GER	ARG; 4		18th	25	7th	67
2016	All-Inkl.com Münnich Motorsport	SEAT Ibiza	55	(Germany) **René Münnich**	POR; 19	HOC; 20	BEL; 18	GBR; 18	NOR; 18	SWE; 19	CAN; 14	FRA; 16	BAR; 18	LAT; 22	GER; 24	ARG; 14		49th	−3	7th	67
2017	All-Inkl.com Münnich Motorsport	SEAT Ibiza	77	(Germany) **René Münnich**	BAR	POR; 18	HOC; 20	BEL							GER; 19	RSA; 17		27th	0	N/A	N/A
2017	All-Inkl.com Münnich Motorsport	Citroën DS3	77	(Germany) **René Münnich**					GBR; 17	NOR	SWE	CAN; 18	FRA	LAT				27th	0	N/A	N/A
2018	All-Inkl.com Münnich Motorsport	SEAT Ibiza	44	(Germany) **Timo Scheider**	BAR	POR	BEL	GBR	NOR	SWE; 17	CAN	FRA; 25	LAT; 13	USA	GER	RSA; 10		18th	13	N/A	N/A
2018	All-Inkl.com Münnich Motorsport	SEAT Ibiza	77	(Germany) **René Münnich**	BAR	POR	BEL	GBR	NOR; 17	SWE	CAN	FRA	LAT	USA	GER; 16	RSA; 16		24th	2	N/A	N/A
2019	All-Inkl.com Münnich Motorsport	SEAT Ibiza Mk4	44	(Germany) **Timo Scheider**	UAE; 6	BAR; 12	BEL; 9	GBR; 4	NOR; 9	SWE; 23	CAN; 10	FRA; 8	LAT; 11	RSA; 10				9th	109	N/A	N/A
2020	All-Inkl.com Münnich Motorsport	SEAT Ibiza Mk4	38	(Germany) **Mandie August**	SWE1	SWE2	FIN	FIN	LAT1	LAT2	CAT1; 16	CAT2; 13						24th	5	5th	219
2020	All-Inkl.com Münnich Motorsport	SEAT Ibiza Mk4	44	(Germany) **Timo Scheider**	SWE1; 3	SWE2; 4	FIN; 5	FIN; 9	LAT1; 12	LAT2; 10	CAT1; 9	CAT2; 9						8th	92	5th	219
2020	All-Inkl.com Münnich Motorsport	SEAT Ibiza Mk4	77	(Germany) **René Münnich**	SWE1; 14	SWE2; 12	FIN; 16	FIN; 9	LAT1; 13	LAT2; 14	CAT1	CAT2						14th	18	5th	219
2021	All-Inkl.com Münnich Motorsport	SEAT Ibiza Mk4	5	(Sweden) **Mattias Ekström**	BAR	SWE	FRA	LAT1; 7	LAT2; 4	BEL	PRT	DEU1	DEU2					10th	37	N/A	N/A
2021	All-Inkl.com Münnich Motorsport	SEAT Ibiza Mk4	38	(Germany) **Mandie August**	BAR; 13	SWE	FRA	LAT1	LAT2	BEL	PRT	DEU1	DEU2					24th	4	N/A	N/A
2021	All-Inkl.com Münnich Motorsport	SEAT Ibiza Mk4	44	(Germany) **Timo Scheider**	BAR; 7	SWE	FRA; 6	LAT1; 6	LAT2; 7	BEL; 9	PRT	DEU1	DEU2					8th	75	N/A	N/A
2021	All-Inkl.com Münnich Motorsport	SEAT Ibiza Mk4	77	(Germany) **René Münnich**	BAR; 5	SWE	FRA	LAT1	LAT2	BEL	PRT	DEU1	DEU2					18th	16	N/A	N/A
2022	All-Inkl.com Münnich Motorsport	SEAT Ibiza RX1e	77	(Germany) **René Münnich**	NOR; 8	LAT1; 6	LAT2; 8	PRT1; 8	PRT2; 6	BEL1; 6	BEL2; 8	CAT1; 8	CAT2; 8	DEU				8th	78	N/A	N/A
2022	All-Inkl.com Münnich Motorsport	SEAT Ibiza RX1e	92	(Sweden) **Anton Marklund**	NOR	LAT1	LAT2	PRT1	PRT2	BEL1	BEL2	CAT1	CAT2	DEU; 8				9th	8	N/A	N/A
2023	ALL-INKL.COM Münnich Motorsport	SEAT Ibiza RX1e	44	(Germany) **Timo Scheider**	PRT; 9	NOR; 3	SWE; 5	GBR; C	BEL; C	DEU; C								4th	89	N/A	N/A
2023	ALL-INKL.COM Münnich Motorsport	OMSE ZEROID X1	44	(Germany) **Timo Scheider**							RSA1; 3	RSA2; 1	HKG1; 3	HKG2; 8				4th	89	N/A	N/A
2023	ALL-INKL.COM Münnich Motorsport	OMSE ZEROID X1	77	(Germany) **René Münnich**							RSA1; 8	RSA2; 8	HKG1; 8	HKG2; 10				8th	30	N/A	N/A
2024	ALL-INKL.COM Münnich Motorsport	SEAT Ibiza RX (Mk5)	77	(Germany) **René Münnich**	SWE1; 10	SWE2; 10	HUN1; 7	HUN2; 6	BEL1; 6	BEL2; 7	PRT1; 5	PRT2; 7	TUR1	TUR2				7th*	76*	N/A	N/A

† Points scored with other team(s).
^{*} Season still in progress.

=== Complete FIA European Rallycross Championship results ===
(key)

==== Division 1A ====
Year	Entrant	Car	Driver	1	2	3	4	5	6	7	8	9	10	ERX	Points
2007	Münnich Motorsport	Volkswagen Polo GTI	**(Germany) René Münnich**	POR	FRA	HUN; 4	AUT	SWE	NOR	BEL	NED	POL	CZE	25th	13

==== Division 1 ====
Year	Entrant	Car	No.	Driver	1	2	3	4	5	6	7	8	9	10	11	ERX	Points
2008	Münnich Motorsport	Škoda Fabia T16 4x4	**(Germany) René Münnich**	22	POR; NC	FRA	HUN; NC	AUT; NC	NOR; NC	SWE; NC	BEL; 16	NED (NC)	CZE; NC	POL; NC	GER; NC	36th	1
2009	Münnich Motorsport	Škoda Fabia T16 4x4	**(Germany) René Münnich**	22	GBR (NC)	POR; 14	FRA; 20	HUN; NC	AUT; NC	SWE	BEL	GER	POL; NC	CZE; 17		33rd	3
2010	All-Inkl.com Münnich Motorsport	Škoda Fabia T16 4x4	**(Germany) René Münnich**	21	POR; 11	FRA; 16	GBR (NC)	HUN; 10	SWE; 19	FIN; 14	BEL (NC)	GER; 13	POL; 8	CZE; NC		15th	30

==== Super1600 ====
Year	Entrant	Car	No.	Driver	1	2	3	4	5	6	7	8	9	10	ERX	Points
2011	All-Inkl.com Münnich Motorsport	Škoda Fabia	22	**(Germany) Mandie August**	GBR (17)	POR; 13	FRA; 31	NOR; 15	SWE; 24	BEL (DNS)	NED; 25	AUT; DNS	POL; 13	CZE; 17	24th	10
2012	All-Inkl.com Münnich Motorsport	Škoda Fabia	22	**(Germany) René Münnich**	GBR; 8	FRA; 13	AUT (DNS)	HUN; 13	NOR; 13	SWE; 14	BEL; 4	NED (15)	FIN; 14	GER; 4	10th	53
2012	All-Inkl.com Münnich Motorsport	Škoda Fabia	24	**(Germany) Mandie August**	GBR (17)	FRA; 28	AUT; 16	HUN; 17	NOR; 19	SWE (22)	BEL; 34	NED; 23	FIN; 18	GER; 11	31st	7
2013	All-Inkl.com Münnich Motorsport	Škoda Fabia	37	(Germany) **René Münnich**	GBR; 7	POR	HUN; 8	FIN	NOR	SWE; 8	FRA	AUT; 9	GER		10th	54
2013	All-Inkl.com Münnich Motorsport	Škoda Fabia	38	**(Germany) Mandie August**	GBR; 10	POR	HUN; 18	FIN	NOR	SWE; 17	FRA	AUT; 11	GER		17th	18
2014	All-Inkl.com Münnich Motorsport	Škoda Fabia	38	**(Germany) Mandie August**	POR	GBR	NOR	FIN	SWE; 20	BEL	FRA	GER; 17	ITA; 17		46th	0
2015	All-Inkl.com Münnich Motorsport	Škoda Fabia	38	**(Germany) Mandie August**	POR; 18	BEL; 16	GER; 15	SWE; 16	FRA; 22	BAR; 16	ITA; 17				25th	5
2018	All-Inkl.com Münnich Motorsport	Škoda Fabia	38	**(Germany) Mandie August**	BAR; 21	POR; 21	NOR; 22	FRA; 20	LAT; 18	GER					34th*	-15*

^{*} Season still in progress

==== Supercar ====
Year	Entrant	Car	No.	Driver	1	2	3	4	5	6	7	8	9	10	ERX	Points
2011	All-Inkl.com Münnich Motorsport	Škoda Fabia T16 4x4	15	(Germany) **René Münnich**	GBR (17)	POR; 11	FRA; NC	NOR; 19	SWE; 12	BEL; 20	NED; 13	AUT	POL	CZE; 15	18th	17
2014	All-Inkl.com Münnich Motorsport	Audi S3	49	(Germany) **René Münnich**	GBR	NOR	BEL	GER; 23	ITA; 16						36th	1
2017	All-Inkl.com Münnich Motorsport	Audi S3	38	(Germany) **Mandie August**	BAR; 25	NOR; 22	SWE; 23								29th	0
2017	All-Inkl.com Münnich Motorsport	SEAT Ibiza	38	(Germany) **Mandie August**				FRA; 22	LAT; 18						29th	0
2017	All-Inkl.com Münnich Motorsport	SEAT Ibiza	77	(Germany) **René Münnich**	BAR; 4			FRA; 13	LAT; 17						11th	38
2017	All-Inkl.com Münnich Motorsport	Citroën DS3	77	(Germany) **René Münnich**		NOR; 19	SWE; 3								11th	38
2018	All-Inkl.com Münnich Motorsport	Audi S3	38	(Germany) **Mandie August**	BAR	BEL	SWE; 22	FRA	LAT						31st	0
2018	All-Inkl.com Münnich Motorsport	SEAT Ibiza	77	(Germany) **René Münnich**	BAR; 11	BEL; 9	SWE; 5	FRA; 10	LAT; 4						7th	52
