= Henry Kwong =

Hong Kong racing driver

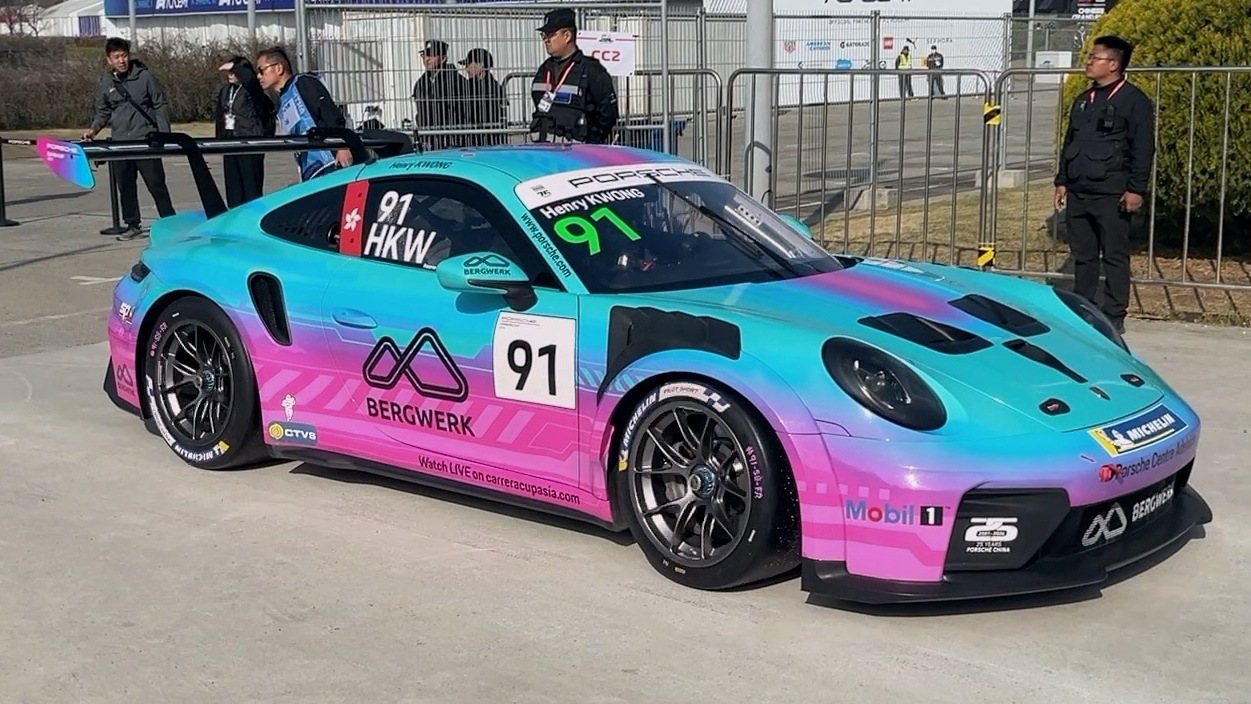
- Kwong driving in the 2026 Porsche Carrera Cup Asia
- Nationality: Hongkonger

Previous series
- 2014 2012: WTCC; Malaysia Merdeka Endurance Race

Henry Kwong is a Hong Kong racing driver previously competing in the World Touring Car Championship driver, where he made his debut in 2014.

== Racing career ==
Kwong began his career in 2012 in the Malaysia Merdeka Endurance Race. In 2014, Kwong made his World Touring Car Championship debut with Campos Racing driving a SEAT León WTCC in the last two rounds of the championship.

== Racing record ==
=== Complete World Touring Car Championship results ===
(key) (Races in bold indicate pole position – 1 point awarded just in first race; races in italics indicate fastest lap – 1 point awarded all races; * signifies that driver led race for at least one lap – 1 point given all races)

Year	Team	Car	1	2	3	4	5	6	7	8	9	10	11	12	13	14	15	16	17	18	19	20	21	22	23	24	DC	Pts
2014	Campos Racing	SEAT León WTCC	MAR; 1	MAR; 2	FRA; 1	FRA; 2	HUN; 1	HUN; 2	SVK; 1	SVK; 2	AUT; 1	AUT; 2	RUS; 1	RUS; 2	BEL; 1	BEL; 2	ARG; 1	ARG; 2	CHN1; 1	CHN1; 2	CHN2; 1	CHN2; 2	JPN; 1; 17	JPN; 2 NC	MAC; 1 DSQ	MAC; 2; 15	NC	0
