= Michael Soong =

Hong Kong racing driver

- Nationality: Hongkonger
- Born: 6 February 1980 (age 46)

Previous series
- 2013-14 2007-14 2004-06: WTCC; China Touring Car Championship; Hong Kong Touring Car Championship

Michael John Soong (born 6 February 1980) is a Hong Kong racing driver previously competing in the China Touring Car Championship. He is a former World Touring Car Championship driver, who made his debut in 2013.

== Racing career ==
Soong began his career in 2004 in the Hong Kong Touring Car Championship. In 2007. he switched to the China Touring Car Championship. In 2013, Soong made his World Touring Car Championship debut with Campos Racing driving a SEAT León WTCC in the last round in Macau. In October 2014, it was announced that he would race in the Chinese round in Beijing, again driving for Campos Racing.

== Racing record ==
=== Complete World Touring Car Championship results ===
(key) (Races in bold indicate pole position – 1 point awarded just in first race; races in italics indicate fastest lap – 1 point awarded all races; * signifies that driver led race for at least one lap – 1 point given all races)

Year	Team	Car	1	2	3	4	5	6	7	8	9	10	11	12	13	14	15	16	17	18	19	20	21	22	23	24	DC	Pts
2013	Campos Racing	SEAT León WTCC	ITA; 1	ITA; 2	MAR; 1	MAR; 2	SVK; 1	SVK; 2	HUN; 1	HUN; 2	AUT; 1	AUT; 2	RUS; 1	RUS; 2	POR; 1	POR; 2	ARG; 1	ARG; 2	USA; 1	USA; 2	JPN; 1	JPN; 2	CHN; 1	CHN; 2	MAC; 1; 18	MAC; 2 Ret	NC	0
2014	Campos Racing	SEAT León WTCC	MAR; 1	MAR; 2	FRA; 1	FRA; 2	HUN; 1	HUN; 2	SVK; 1	SVK; 2	AUT; 1	AUT; 2	RUS; 1	RUS; 2	BEL; 1	BEL; 2	ARG; 1	ARG; 2	CHN1; 1 DNS	CHN1; 2 DNS	CHN2; 1	CHN2; 2	JPN; 1	JPN; 2	MAC; 1	MAC; 2	NC	0
