= William Lok (racing driver) =

Hong Kong racing driver

William Lok (Chinese: 陸漢洋; pinyin: Lù Hànyáng; Jyutping: Luk6 Hon3 Joeng4; born 7 October 1974 in Hong Kong) is a Hong Kong racing driver currently competing in the FIA World Touring Car Championship for Campos Racing.

== Racing career ==
On 20 August 2017, William Lok secured the Drivers’ Championship of the 2017 Asian Le Mans Sprint Cup and became the first Chinese driver to win a regional LMP Sprint Cup title, after winning the Asian Le Mans Sprint Cup title with driving partner Scott Andrews at Malaysia's Sepang International Circuit with one race in hand.

== Personal life ==
William Lok is son of John Lok, the founder of John Lok and Partners Limited. His mother's family founded Saint Honore Cake Shop. He is the cousin of Christine Loh. His mother died in 2004 of ovarian cancer. He is a graduate of Northeastern University with a degree in Finance and Marketing.

== Racing record ==
=== Complete World Touring Car Championship results ===
(key) (Races in bold indicate pole position) (Races in italics indicate fastest lap)

Year	Team	Car	1	2	3	4	5	6	7	8	9	10	11	12	13	14	15	16	17	18	19	20	21	22	23	24	DC	Points
2014	Campos Racing	SEAT León WTCC	MAR; 1	MAR; 2	FRA; 1	FRA; 2	HUN; 1	HUN; 2	SVK; 1	SVK; 2	AUT; 1	AUT; 2	RUS; 1	RUS; 2	BEL; 1	BEL; 2	ARG; 1	ARG; 2	BEI; 1	BEI; 2	CHN; 1 Ret	CHN; 2 DNS	JPN; 1	JPN; 2	MAC; 1 Ret	MAC; 2 DNS	NC	0

=== Complete TCR International Series results ===
(key) (Races in bold indicate pole position) (Races in italics indicate fastest lap)

Year	Team	Car	1	2	3	4	5	6	7	8	9	10	11	12	13	14	15	16	17	18	19	20	21	22	DC	Points
2016	Star Racing Team	Mercedes-Benz C260	BHR; 1	BHR; 2	EST; 1	EST; 2	SPA; 1	SPA; 2	IMO; 1	IMO; 2	SAL; 1	SAL; 2	OSC; 1	OSC; 2	SOC; 1	SOC; 2	CHA; 1	CHA; 2	MRN; 1	MRN; 2	SEP; 1	SEP; 2	MAC; 1 DNQ	MAC; 2 DNQ	NC	0

^{†} Driver did not finish the race, but was classified as he completed over 90% of the race distance.
