= 2014 World Touring Car Championship =

Motorsport competition

Seasons
- ← 2013 2015 →

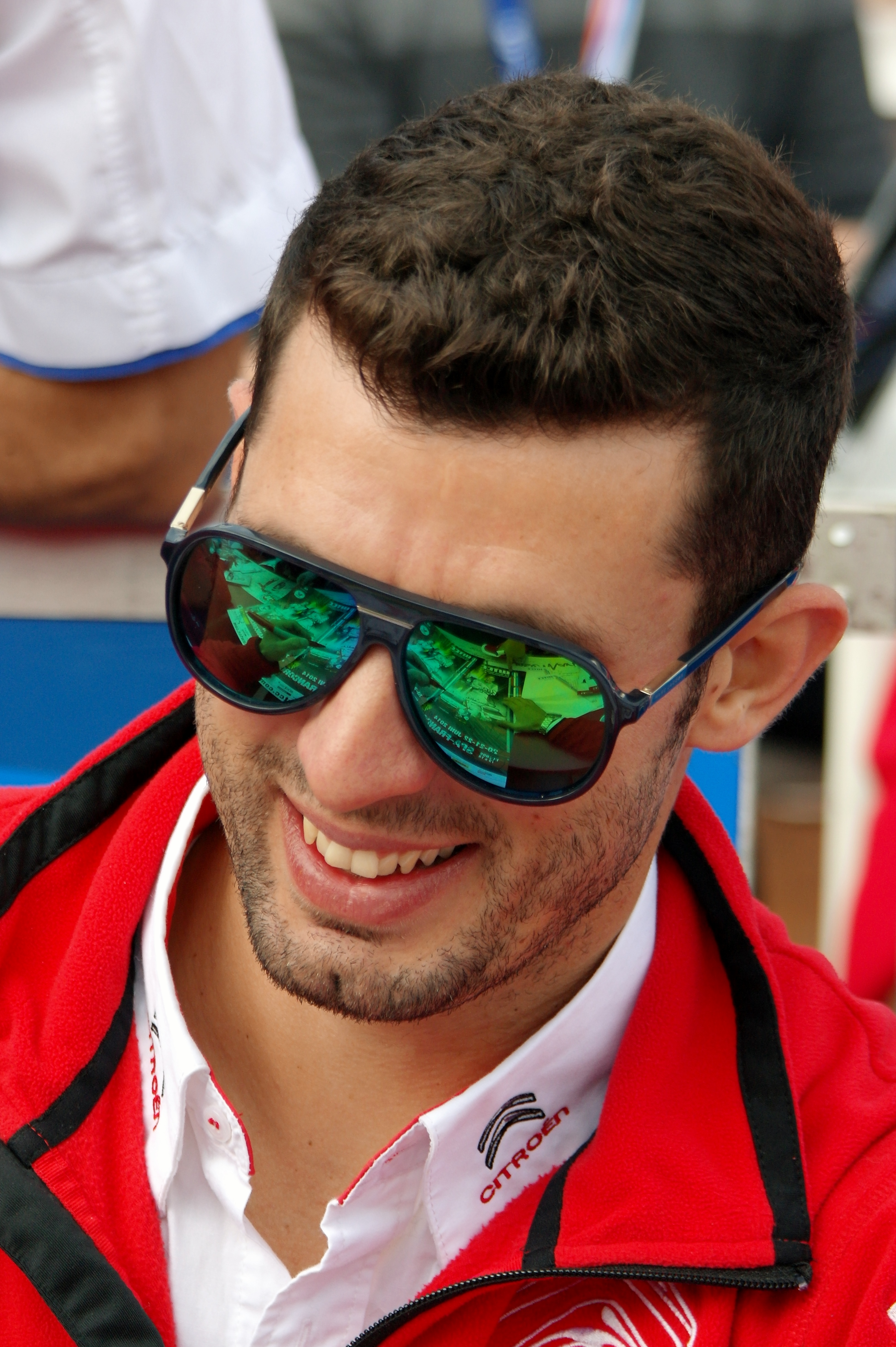
With ten victories during 2014, José María López won the Drivers' Championship by 126 points, ahead of his nearest challenger, Yvan Muller.

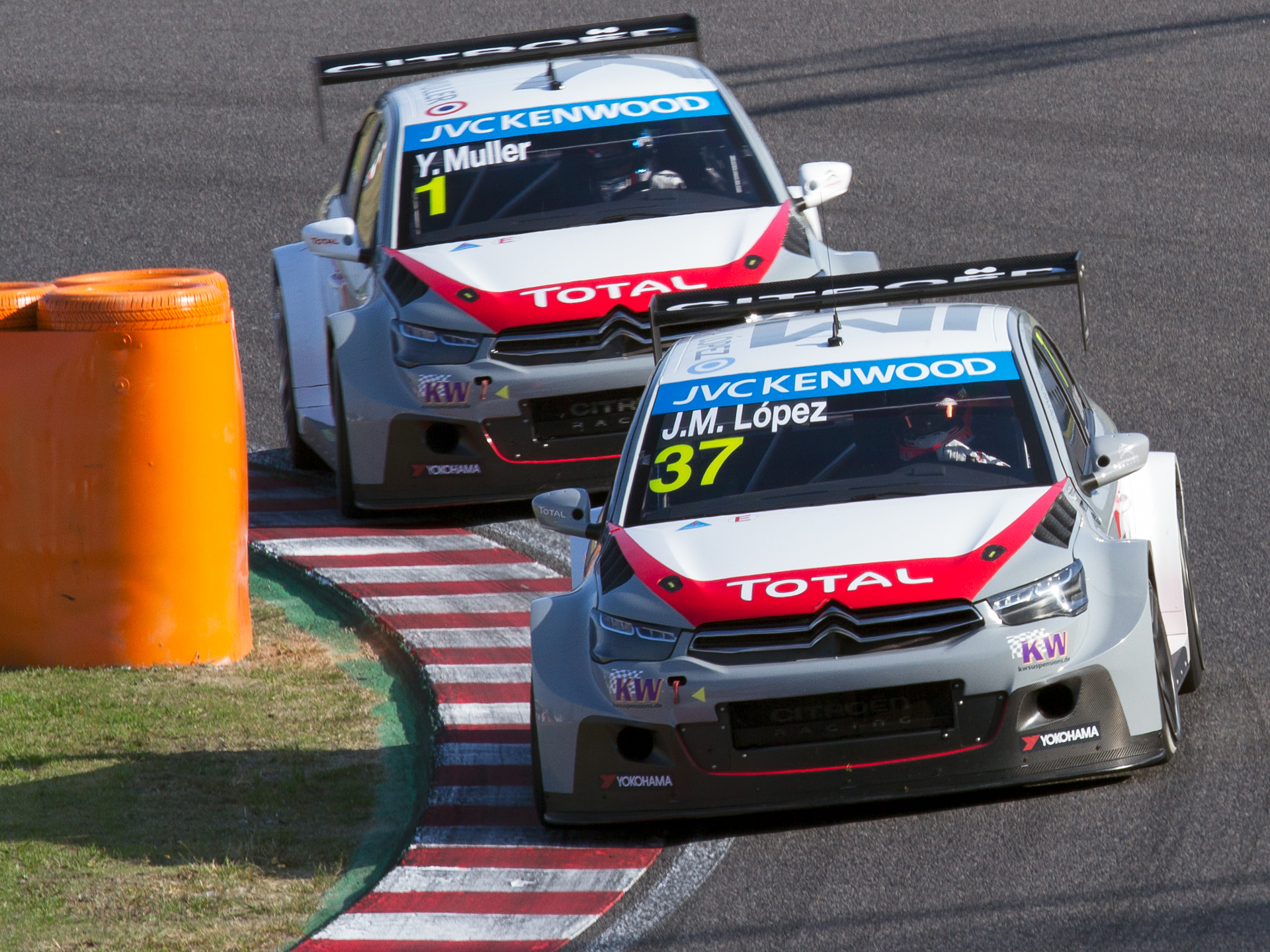
Citroën won the Manufacturers' Championship with the Citroën C-Elysée WTCC, winning 17 of the 23 races (74% of victories).

The 2014 FIA World Touring Car Championship was a motor racing competition organised by the Fédération Internationale de l'Automobile (FIA) for Super 2000 Cars. It was the eleventh FIA World Touring Car Championship, and the tenth since the series was revived in 2005.

After making a race-winning début on home soil during the 2013 campaign, Argentina's José María López won the drivers' championship after performing strongest during the season. Driving for the Citroën team, López won ten races during the season, significantly more than team-mates Yvan Muller – the defending series champion – and Sébastien Loeb, who was in his first season in the championship. López finished all but one race during the season, with his only retirement coming during the second race in Russia, and finished the season 126 points clear of his next closest challenger, which was Muller. Muller took four victories during the season, all coming from pole position. Loeb finished a further 41 points behind Muller, taking a pair of victories, in Morocco and the only race in Slovakia.

Only one other driver won more than one race, as Robert Huff won the first races for Lada Sport in the World Touring Car Championship. Huff won the second races in Beijing and Macau; his win in the latter was his seventh at the circuit, over the previous seven years. Single race winners during 2014 were Gabriele Tarquini (Japan), Tom Chilton (Beijing), Gianni Morbidelli (Hungary), Mehdi Bennani (Shanghai) and Ma Qing Hua in Russia. Morbidelli's win was his first in the series, while the victories for Bennani and Ma were the first in FIA competition for their respective countries, Morocco and China.

Citroën dominated the manufacturers' championship, taking a total of 17 overall wins out of the 23 races. The marque finished almost 300 points clear of Honda, who finished in second position. In the TC2-only Yokohama Drivers' Trophy, Franz Engstler finished well clear of the field in his final WTCC season before moving to the TCR International Series. Engstler achieved 20 victories and a pair of second places from 23 starts, and finished 90 points clear of closest rival John Filippi, who won the second race in Japan. The other race winners were Pasquale Di Sabatino in Hungary, and ETCC regular Petr Fulín, who won the race in Slovakia. In the Yokohama Teams' Trophy for non-manufacturer teams, ROAL Motorsport, with Chilton and Tom Coronel as its drivers, finished 91 points clear of the single-car team of Zengő Motorsport and driver Norbert Michelisz. The Yokohama Performer of the Year award went to López, taking the most fastest laps of the season, with eleven.

== Teams and drivers ==
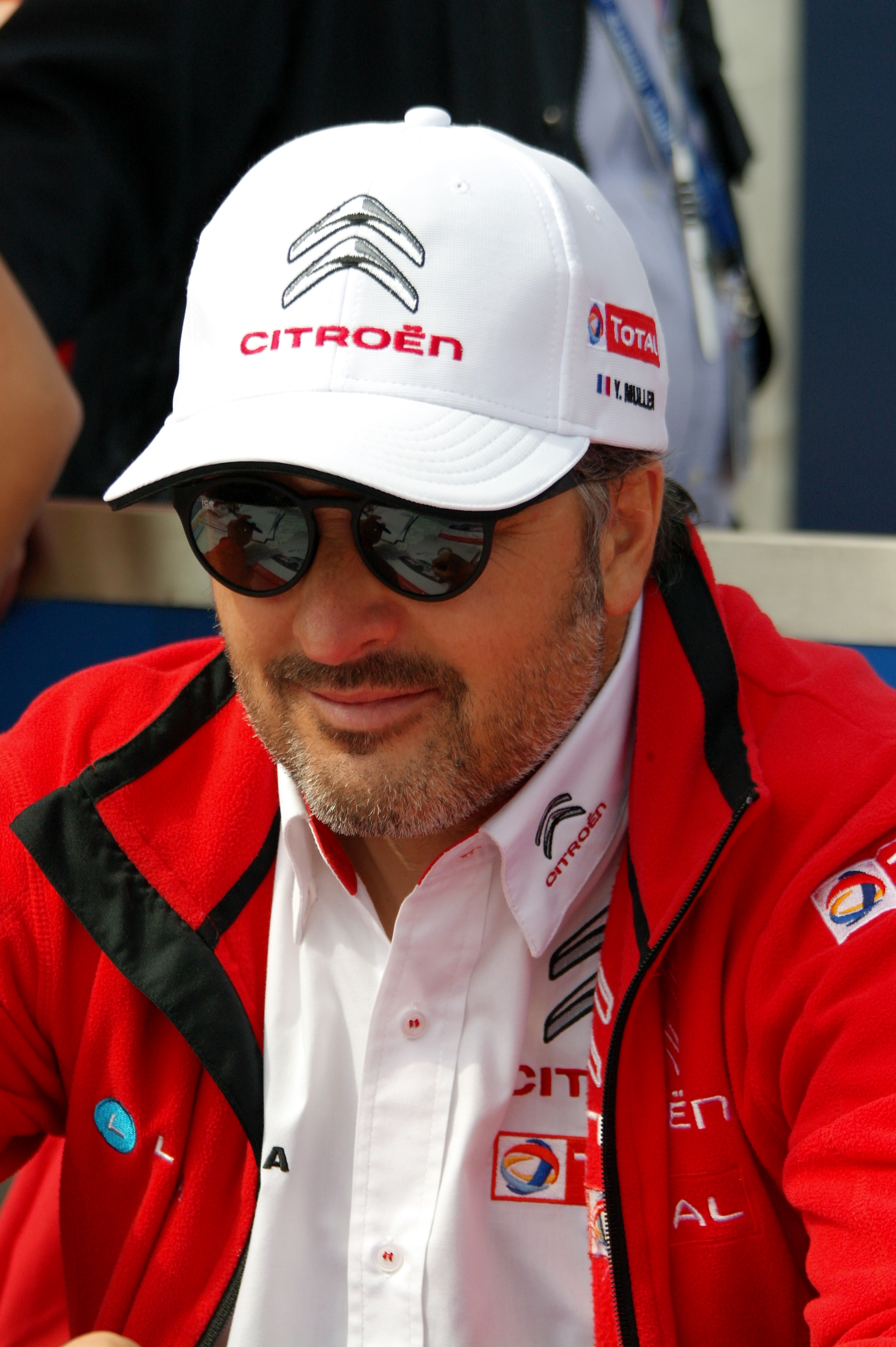
Defending champion Yvan Muller placed second in the Drivers' Championship, winning four races.

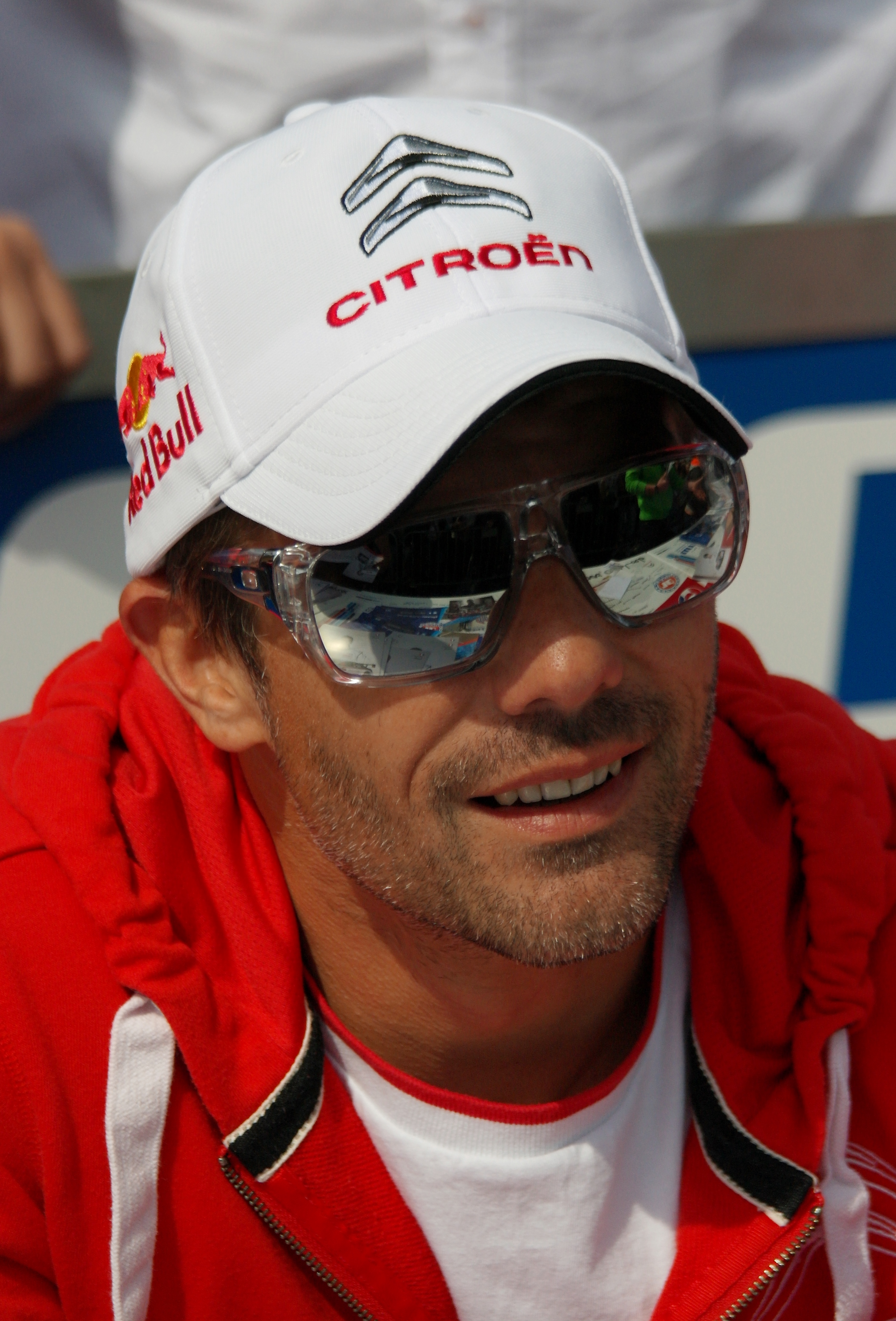
In his rookie season in the championship, Sébastien Loeb placed third with two race victories.

For the 2014 season, the series' technical regulations were altered. Cars built to the 2014 specifications were classified as "TC1", whilst cars built prior to 2014 were classified as "TC2".

| Team | Car | No. | Drivers | Rounds |
TC1 entries
| (France) Citroën Total WTCC | Citroën C-Elysée WTCC | 1 | (France) Yvan Muller | All |
| (France) Citroën Total WTCC | Citroën C-Elysée WTCC | 9 | (France) Sébastien Loeb | All |
| (France) Citroën Total WTCC | Citroën C-Elysée WTCC | 33 | (China) Ma Qing Hua | 6–7, 9–10, 12 |
| (France) Citroën Total WTCC | Citroën C-Elysée WTCC | 37 | (Argentina) José María López | All |
| (Japan) Castrol Honda World Touring Car Team | Honda Civic WTCC | 2 | (Italy) Gabriele Tarquini | All |
| (Japan) Castrol Honda World Touring Car Team | Honda Civic WTCC | 18 | (Portugal) Tiago Monteiro | All |
| (Russia) Lada Sport Lukoil (Russia) Lada Sport (Note: The team was renamed Lada Sport from the Race of Beijing onwards following Lukoil's decision to terminate sponsorship with immediate effect.) | Lada Granta 1.6T | 11 | (United Kingdom) James Thompson | All |
| (Russia) Lada Sport Lukoil (Russia) Lada Sport | Lada Granta 1.6T | 12 | (United Kingdom) Robert Huff | All |
| (Russia) Lada Sport Lukoil (Russia) Lada Sport | Lada Granta 1.6T | 14 | (Russia) Mikhail Kozlovskiy | All |
Independent TC1 entries
| (Italy) ROAL Motorsport | Chevrolet RML Cruze TC1 | 3 | (United Kingdom) Tom Chilton | All |
| (Italy) ROAL Motorsport | Chevrolet RML Cruze TC1 | 4 | (Netherlands) Tom Coronel | All |
| (Hungary) Zengő Motorsport | Honda Civic WTCC | 5 | (Hungary) Norbert Michelisz | All |
| (Spain) Campos Racing | Chevrolet RML Cruze TC1 | 7 | (France) Hugo Valente | All |
| (Spain) Campos Racing | Chevrolet RML Cruze TC1 | 74 | (Spain) Pepe Oriola | 12 |
| (Spain) Campos Racing | Chevrolet RML Cruze TC1 | 98 | (Serbia) Dušan Borković | 1–11 |
| (Germany) ALL-INKL.COM Münnich Motorsport | Chevrolet RML Cruze TC1 | 10 | (Italy) Gianni Morbidelli | All |
| (Germany) ALL-INKL.COM Münnich Motorsport | Chevrolet RML Cruze TC1 | 77 | (Germany) René Münnich | All |
| (Italy) Proteam Racing | Honda Civic WTCC | 25 | (Morocco) Mehdi Bennani | All |
TC2 entries
| (Germany) Liqui Moly Team Engstler | BMW 320 TC | 6 | (Germany) Franz Engstler | All |
| (Germany) Liqui Moly Team Engstler | BMW 320 TC | 8 | (Italy) Pasquale Di Sabatino | 1–7 |
| (Germany) Liqui Moly Team Engstler | BMW 320 TC | 15 | (Argentina) Camilo Echevarría | 8 |
| (Germany) Liqui Moly Team Engstler | BMW 320 TC | 26 | (Macau) Felipe De Souza | 9–12 |
| (Spain) Campos Racing | SEAT León WTCC | 19 | (Hong Kong) Henry Kwong | 11–12 |
| (Spain) Campos Racing | SEAT León WTCC | 22 | (Czech Republic) Petr Fulín | 1, 4 |
| (Spain) Campos Racing | SEAT León WTCC | 27 | (France) John Filippi | All |
| (Spain) Campos Racing | SEAT León WTCC | 38 | (Hong Kong) William Lok | 10, 12 |
| (Spain) Campos Racing | SEAT León WTCC | 50 | (Russia) Nikita Misiulia | 6 |
| (Spain) Campos Racing | SEAT León WTCC | 55 | (Hungary) Norbert Nagy | 7 |
| (Spain) Campos Racing | SEAT León WTCC | 80 | (Hong Kong) Michael Soong | 9 |
| (Macau) RPM Racing Team | BMW 320 TC | 44 | (Macau) Mak Ka Lok | 12 |
| (Sweden) NIKA Racing | Honda Civic WTCC | 99 | (Japan) Yukinori Taniguchi | 3 |

=== Team changes ===
- French car manufacturer Citroën entered the championship in 2014, with a works team, competing with the Citroën C-Elysée model. The team entered three cars for the full season, and added an additional entry for Ma Qing Hua in five rounds of the championship.
- Honda expanded to become a four-car operation, with two cars entered by the works Honda World Touring Car Team. Two additional cars were supplied to Proteam Racing and Zengő Motorsport with each team running one car.
- Lada Sport expanded to run three cars.
- In September 2013, SEAT announced that they would not return to the WTCC in 2014 in order to focus on the revived SEAT León Eurocup. Some private entries used old-specification SEAT cars in the TC2 class.
- Münnich Motorsport had originally intended to enter one car for team owner René Münnich in selected races in the TC2 class, but later elected to remain in TC1, competing with two 2014-specification Chevrolet Cruzes.
- The RML Group shifted its focus in 2014, withdrawing their team in order to become a constructor and supply 2014-specification Chevrolet Cruzes to customer teams.
- Campos Racing and ROAL Motorsport ran RML built TC1-specification Chevrolet Cruzes. Each team fielded two TC1 cars, while Campos Racing also fielded one full-time and two part-time TC2-specification SEAT León WTCC cars.
- Bamboo Engineering left the series to run a single Aston Martin V8 Vantage in the World Endurance Championship.
- NIKA Racing switched to a TC2-specification Honda Civic WTCC for the 2014 season after racing with a Chevrolet Cruze 1.6T for the last two seasons.

=== Driver changes ===
- Robert Huff left the Münnich Motorsport team to join Lada Sport.
- Nine-time World Rally Champion Sébastien Loeb entered the championship with Citroën Total WTCC.
- José María López joined Citroën for a full-season campaign after making his World Touring Car Championship debut at his home race in Argentina during the 2013 season.
- Yvan Muller left RML after four years with the team, joining Citroën's campaign alongside Loeb.
- Dušan Borković entered the series with a Chevrolet Cruze alongside Hugo Valente at Campos Racing in the TC1 class.
- Tom Chilton left RML and moved to ROAL Motorsport alongside Tom Coronel.
- Stefano D'Aste and Fredy Barth did not compete in the series, in the 2014 season.
- Darryl O'Young and Alex MacDowall left the series to compete for Bamboo Engineering in the World Endurance Championship.
- James Nash and Marc Basseng left the series to join Belgian Audi Club Team WRT in the Blancpain Endurance Series and Blancpain Sprint Series respectively.
- Ma Qing Hua entered the series, driving the fourth Citroën car at five meetings.
- John Filippi entered the series, driving for Campos Racing in a SEAT León in the TC2 class.
- Yukinori Taniguchi returned to the series for 2014, driving for NIKA Racing.

== Regulation changes ==
The sporting and technical regulations were approved by the FIA, at the July 2013 meeting of the World Motor Sport Council:

=== Sporting regulations ===
- Race distances were fixed at 60 kilometres (37 miles), and all races utilised a standing start.
- Qualifying was held in three parts, with the top five going into Q3.
- The balance of performance—introducing various waivers and differentiated base weights of the cars to equalise the field— but compensation weights were used once again.

=== Technical regulations ===
The series introduced a raft of changes to the technical regulations for the 2014 season. The cars were still built to Super 2000 regulations, but with significant changes compared to the 2011 generation of cars. The minimum weight of the cars was reduced from 1,150 kilograms (2,540 pounds) to 1,100 kilograms (2,400 pounds), and was accompanied by an increase in the power output of the engine, which rose to 380 bhp, an increase of between 50 and 60 bhp depending on the engine being used. The size of the wheels being used increased to 18", with MacPherson strut suspension being introduced to all cars. The dimensions of the cars changed, with a maximum width of 1,950 mm (77 in), and a 100 mm (3.9 in) front splitter. Changes to the aerodynamic package allowed teams to use flat floors, and introduce single-plane rear wings that were allowed, but to be no higher than the roof of the car.

== Calendar ==
The provisional 2014 schedule was announced on 4 November 2013. The season was once again contested over twenty-four races at twelve circuits.

| Rnd. | Race | Race Name | Circuit | Date |
|---|---|---|---|---|
| 1 | 1 | Race of Morocco | (Morocco) Circuit International Automobile Moulay El Hassan | 13 April |
| 1 | 2 | Race of Morocco | (Morocco) Circuit International Automobile Moulay El Hassan | 13 April |
| 2 | 3 | JVC Kenwood Race of France | (France) Circuit Paul Ricard | 20 April |
| 2 | 4 | JVC Kenwood Race of France | (France) Circuit Paul Ricard | 20 April |
| 3 | 5 | Race of Hungary | (Hungary) Hungaroring | 4 May |
| 3 | 6 | Race of Hungary | (Hungary) Hungaroring | 4 May |
| 4 | 7 | Race of Slovakia | Automotodróm Slovakia Ring | 11 May |
| 4 | 8 | Race of Slovakia | Automotodróm Slovakia Ring | 11 May |
| 5 | 9 | Race of Austria | (Austria) Salzburgring | 25 May |
| 5 | 10 | Race of Austria | (Austria) Salzburgring | 25 May |
| 6 | 11 | Lukoil Race of Russia | (Russia) Moscow Raceway | 8 June |
| 6 | 12 | Lukoil Race of Russia | (Russia) Moscow Raceway | 8 June |
| 7 | 13 | Race of Belgium | (Belgium) Circuit de Spa-Francorchamps | 22 June |
| 7 | 14 | Race of Belgium | (Belgium) Circuit de Spa-Francorchamps | 22 June |
| 8 | 15 | Race of Argentina | (Argentina) Autódromo Termas de Río Hondo | 3 August |
| 8 | 16 | Race of Argentina | (Argentina) Autódromo Termas de Río Hondo | 3 August |
| 9 | 17 | Race of Beijing | (China) Goldenport Park Circuit | 5 October |
| 9 | 18 | Race of Beijing | (China) Goldenport Park Circuit | 5 October |
| 10 | 19 | Race of Shanghai | (China) Shanghai International Circuit | 12 October |
| 10 | 20 | Race of Shanghai | (China) Shanghai International Circuit | 12 October |
| 11 | 21 | JVC Kenwood Race of Japan | (Japan) Suzuka Circuit | 26 October |
| 11 | 22 | JVC Kenwood Race of Japan | (Japan) Suzuka Circuit | 26 October |
| 12 | 23 | Guia Race of Macau | (Macau) Guia Circuit | 16 November |
| 12 | 24 | Guia Race of Macau | (Macau) Guia Circuit | 16 November |

=== Calendar changes ===
- The Race of Italy at the Autodromo Nazionale Monza and the Race of Portugal at the Circuito da Boavista were removed from the schedule. They were replaced by Race of France and Race of Belgium. The Race of France was held at the Circuit Paul Ricard using a modified layout of the Grand Prix circuit used by Formula One between 1986 and 1990. The Race of Belgium was held at the Circuit de Spa-Francorchamps with the circuit making its return on the calendar after last appearing in 2005.
- On 4 January, the FIA announced that the full Grand Prix circuit at Suzuka would be utilised, for the Race of Japan having previously used the East circuit.
- On 22 January it was announced that the opening round at the Circuit International Automobile Moulay El Hassan would be delayed by one week from 6 to 13 April.
- On 2 June it was announced that the Race of the United States would be discontinued due to logistical issues, and was replaced by an additional round in China held at the Goldenport Park Circuit.

== Results and standings ==
=== Races ===
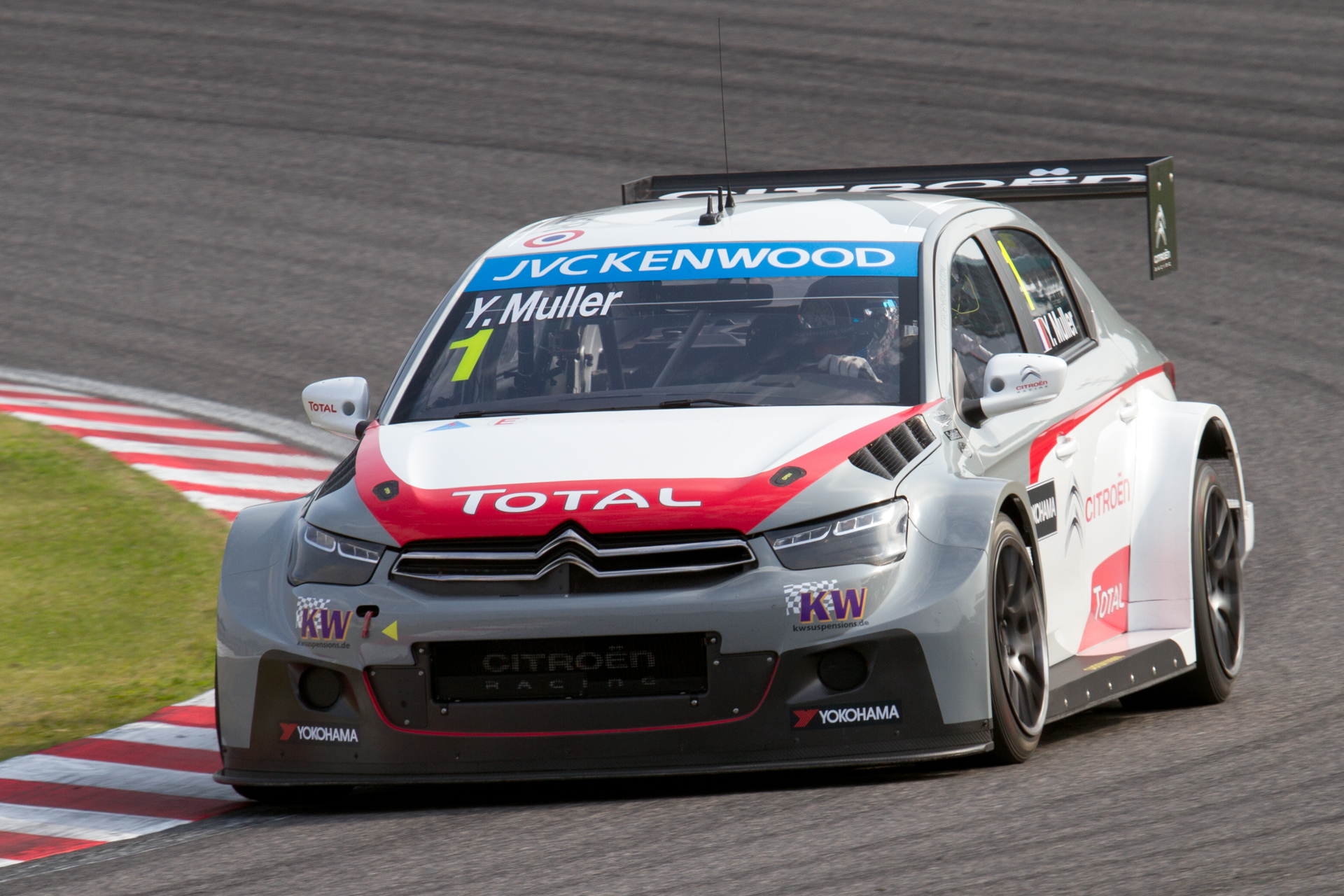
Yvan Muller and his Citroën C-Elysée WTCC. As the most competitive car, the Citroën C-Elysée WTCC got a maximum of 60 kg ballast during the whole season.

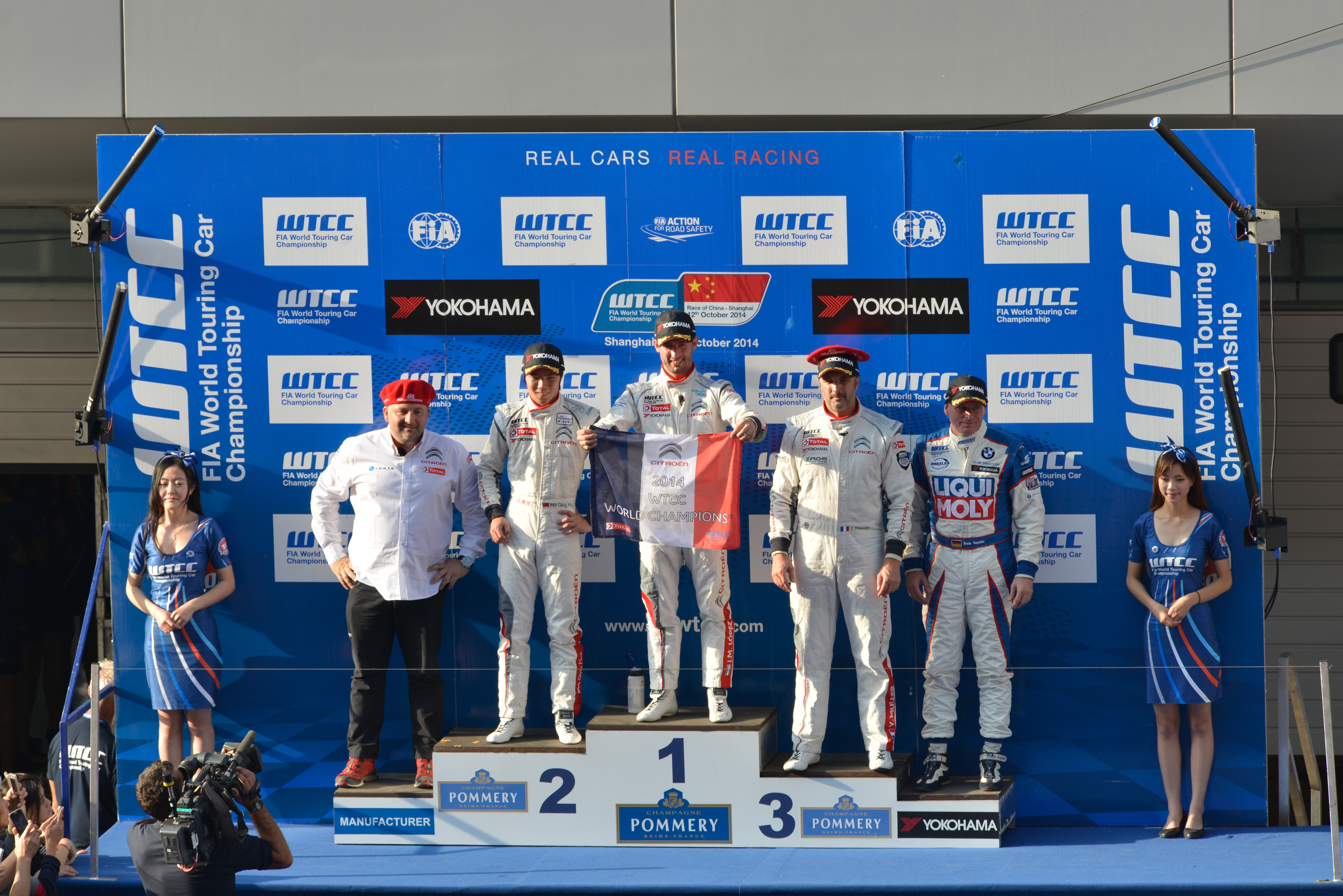
The Citroën Racing/Total team won the Manufacturer title five races before the end of the season, with a Citroën C-Elysée WTCC 1-2-3-4 at the race of Shanghaï (from left to right: Yves Matton director of Citroën Racing, Ma Qing Hua, J-M López, Yvan Muller and Franz Engstler for 'TC2')

==== Compensation weights ====
The most competitive cars keep a 60 kg compensation weight. The other cars get a lower one, calculated according to their results for the three previous rounds. The less the cars get some good results, the less they get a compensation weight, from 0 kg to 60 kg. The compensation weights were introduced starting from the third round.

During the whole season, the Citroën C-Elysée was the reference car with the best races results and so was handicapped by a 60 kg compensation weight to limit its performances, as well as during the qualifications than during the races.

| Car | Hungaroring | Slovakia Ring | Salzburgring | Moscow | Spa-Francorchamps | Termas de Río Hondo | Beijing | Shanghai | Suzuka | Macau |
|---|---|---|---|---|---|---|---|---|---|---|
| Citroën C-Elysée WTCC | +60 kg | +60 kg | +60 kg | +60 kg | +60 kg | +60 kg | +60 kg | +60 kg | +60 kg | +60 kg |
| Honda Civic WTCC | 0 kg | 0 kg | 0 kg | +20 kg | +20 kg | +20 kg | +30 kg | +20 kg | +30 kg | +30 kg |
| Chevrolet RML Cruze TC1 | 0 kg | 0 kg | 0 kg | +20 kg | +20 kg | +40 kg | +20 kg | +40 kg | +30 kg | +40 kg |
| Lada Granta 1.6T | 0 kg | 0 kg | 0 kg | 0 kg | 0 kg | 0 kg | 0 kg | 0 kg | 0 kg | 0 kg |

==== Results ====
| Race | Race Name | Pole Position | Fastest lap | Winning driver | Winning team | Winning manufacturer | TC2 winner | Report |
|---|---|---|---|---|---|---|---|---|
| 1 | Race of Morocco | (Argentina) José María López | (France) Sébastien Loeb | (Argentina) José María López | (France) Citroën Total WTCC | (France) Citroën | (Germany) Franz Engstler | Report |
| 2 | Race of Morocco | | (Argentina) José María López | (France) Sébastien Loeb | (France) Citroën Total WTCC | (France) Citroën | (Germany) Franz Engstler | Report |
| 3 | Race of France | (France) Yvan Muller (Note: Sébastien Loeb had claimed his first career pole by setting the fastest time, ahead of team-mates José María López and Yvan Muller. Loeb and López eventually lost their front row positions and their qualifying points after the automatic fuel cut-off system did not function correctly in scrutineering on their respective cars. Both drivers started the two races from the back of the grid and Muller was promoted to pole.) | (France) Yvan Muller | (France) Yvan Muller | (France) Citroën Total WTCC | (France) Citroën | (Germany) Franz Engstler | Report |
| 4 | Race of France | | (Argentina) José María López | (Argentina) José María López | (France) Citroën Total WTCC | (France) Citroën | (Germany) Franz Engstler | Report |
| 5 | Race of Hungary | (France) Yvan Muller | (France) Yvan Muller | (France) Yvan Muller | (France) Citroën Total WTCC | (France) Citroën | (Italy) Pasquale Di Sabatino | Report |
| 6 | Race of Hungary | | (Portugal) Tiago Monteiro | (Italy) Gianni Morbidelli | (Germany) Münnich Motorsport | (United States) Chevrolet | (Germany) Franz Engstler | Report |
| 7 | Race of Slovakia | (Argentina) José María López | (France) Sébastien Loeb | (France) Sébastien Loeb | (France) Citroën Total WTCC | (France) Citroën | (Czech Republic) Petr Fulín | Report |
| 8 | Race of Slovakia | Race cancelled | | | | | | Report |
| 9 | Race of Austria | (Italy) Gianni Morbidelli (Note: Gianni Morbidelli had claimed his first career pole and the first of the season for a non-Citroën car by setting the fastest time, ahead of Yvan Muller and Sébastien Loeb. Morbidelli eventually received a five place penalty for improving his time under yellow flag during Q1 but was entitled to keep the five championship points for pole position.) | (Argentina) José María López | (France) Yvan Muller | (France) Citroën Total WTCC | (France) Citroën | (Germany) Franz Engstler | Report |
| 10 | Race of Austria | | (Argentina) José María López | (Argentina) José María López | (France) Citroën Total WTCC | (France) Citroën | (Germany) Franz Engstler | Report |
| 11 | Race of Russia | (Argentina) José María López | (Argentina) José María López | (Argentina) José María López | (France) Citroën Total WTCC | (France) Citroën | (Germany) Franz Engstler | Report |
| 12 | Race of Russia | | (France) Hugo Valente | (China) Ma Qing Hua | (France) Citroën Total WTCC | (France) Citroën | (Germany) Franz Engstler | Report |
| 13 | Race of Belgium | (France) Yvan Muller | (France) Yvan Muller | (France) Yvan Muller | (France) Citroën Total WTCC | (France) Citroën | (Germany) Franz Engstler | Report |
| 14 | Race of Belgium | | (Argentina) José María López | (Argentina) José María López | (France) Citroën Total WTCC | (France) Citroën | (Germany) Franz Engstler | Report |
| 15 | Race of Argentina | (Argentina) José María López | (Argentina) José María López | (Argentina) José María López | (France) Citroën Total WTCC | (France) Citroën | (Germany) Franz Engstler | Report |
| 16 | Race of Argentina | | (Argentina) José María López | (Argentina) José María López | (France) Citroën Total WTCC | (France) Citroën | (Germany) Franz Engstler | Report |
| 17 | Race of China, Beijing | (United Kingdom) Tom Chilton | (United Kingdom) Tom Chilton | (United Kingdom) Tom Chilton | (Italy) ROAL Motorsport | (United States) Chevrolet | (Germany) Franz Engstler | Report |
| 18 | Race of China, Beijing | | (Argentina) José María López | (United Kingdom) Robert Huff | (Russia) Lada Sport | (Russia) Lada | (Germany) Franz Engstler | Report |
| 19 | Race of China, Shanghai | (Argentina) José María López | (China) Ma Qing Hua | (Argentina) José María López | (France) Citroën Total WTCC | (France) Citroën | (Germany) Franz Engstler | Report |
| 20 | Race of China, Shanghai | | (Italy) Gabriele Tarquini | (Morocco) Mehdi Bennani | (Italy) Proteam Racing | (Japan) Honda | (Germany) Franz Engstler | Report |
| 21 | Race of Japan | (Argentina) José María López | (Argentina) José María López | (Argentina) José María López | (France) Citroën Total WTCC | (France) Citroën | (Germany) Franz Engstler | Report |
| 22 | Race of Japan | | (Italy) Gabriele Tarquini | (Italy) Gabriele Tarquini | (Japan) Castrol Honda WTC Team | (Japan) Honda | (France) John Filippi | Report |
| 23 | Guia Race of Macau | (Argentina) José María López | (Argentina) José María López | (Argentina) José María López | (France) Citroën Total WTCC | (France) Citroën | (Germany) Franz Engstler | Report |
| 24 | Guia Race of Macau | | (United Kingdom) Robert Huff | (United Kingdom) Robert Huff | (Russia) Lada Sport | (Russia) Lada | (Germany) Franz Engstler | Report |

=== Championship standings ===
==== Drivers' Championship ====
| Pos. | Driver | MAR (Morocco) | | FRA (France) | | HUN (Hungary) | | SVK (Slovakia) | | AUT (Austria) | | RUS (Russia) | | BEL (Belgium) | | ARG (Argentina) | | CHN1 (China) | | CHN2 (China) | | JPN (Japan) | | MAC (Macau) | | Pts. |
|---|---|---|---|---|---|---|---|---|---|---|---|---|---|---|---|---|---|---|---|---|---|---|---|---|---|---|
| 1 | (Argentina) José María López | **1**^{1} | 2 | 4 | 1 | 2^{2} | 6 | **2**^{1} | C | 3^{5} | 1 | **1**^{1} | Ret | 2^{3} | 1 | **1**^{1} | 1 | 3^{4} | 4 | **1**^{1} | 3 | **1**^{1} | 6 | **1**^{1} | 5 | 462 |
| 2 | (France) Yvan Muller | 3^{4} | Ret | **1**^{1} | 2 | **1**^{1} | 5 | 10^{3} | C | **1**^{2} | Ret | 4 | 2 | **1**^{1} | 2 | 3^{2} | 3 | 2^{3} | 9 | 3^{3} | Ret | Ret^{2} | 5 | 5^{3} | 2 | 336 |
| 3 | (France) Sébastien Loeb | 2^{2} | 1 | 2 | 6 | 7^{3} | 9 | 1^{2} | C | 4^{3} | 7 | 3^{4} | 5 | 3^{2} | 5 | 4^{3} | 6 | 5 | 3 | 4^{5} | 12 | 3^{3} | 7 | 6^{2} | 6 | 295 |
| 4 | (Hungary) Norbert Michelisz | 9 | DNS | 7^{4} | 8 | 6 | 10 | 3^{4} | C | 9 | 4 | 9 | 7 | 7 | 7 | 2^{4} | 7 | 6 | 5 | 5^{4} | 4 | 4 | 3 | 2^{4} | 4 | 201 |
| 5 | (Portugal) Tiago Monteiro | 5 | 10† | 8 | 3 | 3^{4} | 2 | 7 | **C** | 5 | 3 | 7^{3} | Ret | 6 | 4 | 5^{5} | 5 | Ret | 13 | 7 | 2 | 9 | 9 | 4 | 16† | 186 |
| 6 | (Italy) Gabriele Tarquini | DNS | DNS | 3^{2} | 4 | 4^{5} | 8 | 8 | C | 8 | **2** | 2^{2} | Ret | 8^{5} | 8 | 8 | 4 | 16†^{2} | 10 | 6 | Ret | 6 | **1** | 3 | DNS | 182 |
| 7 | (Netherlands) Tom Coronel | Ret | **Ret** | WD | WD | 8 | 4 | 4 | C | 2^{4} | 5 | 8 | 4 | 5 | 3 | 11 | 10 | 17† | 2 | 8 | 6 | 7 | 4 | 7^{5} | 8 | 159 |
| 8 | (United Kingdom) Tom Chilton | 4^{3} | 4 | 9^{5} | 15 | 13 | 7 | 5 | C | 6 | Ret | 5^{5} | 6 | 10 | 10 | 6 | Ret | **1**^{1} | 8 | Ret | 7 | 2^{4} | 10 | 12 | 7 | 150 |
| 9 | (Italy) Gianni Morbidelli | 15 | 6 | 11 | 9 | 9 | 1 | 6^{5} | C | 10^{1} | 6 | 12 | 8 | 4 | **6** | 12 | 13 | 4^{5} | 7 | 11 | 13 | 10 | 8 | 10 | Ret | 109 |
| 10 | (United Kingdom) Robert Huff | Ret | Ret | 5 | 11 | 11 | 12 | 9 | C | 12 | Ret | 10 | Ret | 16 | 13 | 7 | **2** | 8 | **1** | 15† | Ret | 12 | 11 | 9 | 1 | 93 |
| 11 | (Morocco) Mehdi Bennani | 7 | DSQ | 13 | **5** | 5 | DNS | 14 | C | 7 | 8 | 11 | 3 | 13 | 11 | 9 | 8 | 9 | Ret | 10 | **1** | 11 | Ret | 19† | DNS | 85 |
| 12 | (France) Hugo Valente | 8 | 3 | 6^{3} | 10 | 10 | **3** | 11 | C | NC | Ret | Ret | **9** | 12^{4} | 9 | Ret | Ret | 12 | 11 | 9 | 8 | 5^{5} | Ret | NC | **3** | 85 |
| 13 | (China) Ma Qing Hua | | | | | | | | | | | 6 | 1 | 11 | Ret | | | 15† | 12 | 2^{2} | 5 | | | 8 | Ret | 69 |
| 14 | (Serbia) Dušan Borković | 6^{5} | Ret | 14 | 7 | 12 | 11 | 12 | C | Ret | Ret | Ret | 11 | 9 | Ret | Ret | DSQ | Ret | DNS | 12 | 9 | 8 | 2 | | | 41 |
| 15 | (United Kingdom) James Thompson | 10 | DNS | 10 | 13 | DSQ | DSQ | DSQ | C | 13 | Ret | 14 | 12 | 17 | 15 | 10 | 9 | 7 | 6 | Ret | 10 | 13 | 12 | 11 | 9 | 22 |
| 16 | (Russia) Mikhail Kozlovskiy | 11 | 5 | 15 | 14 | Ret | Ret | Ret | C | 14 | 10 | 15 | Ret | 14 | 12 | 14 | 11 | 11 | DNS | Ret | 11 | 14 | 13 | 13 | Ret | 11 |
| 17 | (Germany) Franz Engstler | 12 | 7 | 16 | 16 | 15 | 14 | 16 | C | 15 | 11 | 16 | 13 | 18 | 16 | 15 | 14 | 10 | 14 | 13 | 14 | 15 | Ret | 14 | 10 | 8 |
| 18 | (France) John Filippi | 14 | 8 | 18 | Ret | 16 | 16 | 18† | C | 16 | 13 | 18 | 15 | 19 | 19 | 16 | 15† | 13 | 15 | 14 | 15 | 16 | 14 | 16 | 12 | 4 |
| 19 | (Germany) René Münnich | Ret | Ret | 12 | 12 | 18 | 13 | 13 | C | 11 | 9 | 13 | 10 | 15 | 14 | 13 | 12 | Ret | DNS | 17† | Ret | NC | 16 | 15 | 11 | 3 |
| 20 | (Italy) Pasquale Di Sabatino | 13 | 9 | 17 | 17 | 14 | 15 | 17 | C | 17 | 12 | 17 | 14 | 21 | 17 | | | | | | | | | | | 2 |
| — | (Macau) Felipe De Souza | | | | | | | | | | | | | | | | | 14 | Ret | 16 | 16 | Ret | 15 | 17 | 13 | 0 |
| — | (Macau) Mak Ka Lok | | | | | | | | | | | | | | | | | | | | | | | 18 | 14 | 0 |
| — | (Hong Kong) Henry Kwong | | | | | | | | | | | | | | | | | | | | | 17 | NC | DSQ | 15 | 0 |
| — | (Czech Republic) Petr Fulín | DNS | DNS | | | | | 15 | C | | | | | | | | | | | | | | | | | 0 |
| — | (Argentina) Camilo Echevarría | | | | | | | | | | | | | | | 17 | 16 | | | | | | | | | 0 |
| — | (Russia) Nikita Misyulya | | | | | | | | | | | Ret | 16 | | | | | | | | | | | | | 0 |
| — | (Japan) Yukinori Taniguchi | | | | | 17 | 17 | | | | | | | | | | | | | | | | | | | 0 |
| — | (Hungary) Norbert Nagy | | | | | | | | | | | | | 20 | 18 | | | | | | | | | | | 0 |
| — | (Hong Kong) William Lok | | | | | | | | | | | | | | | | | | | Ret | DNS | | | Ret | DNS | 0 |
| — | (Hong Kong) Michael Soong | | | | | | | | | | | | | | | | | DNS | DNS | | | | | | | 0 |
| — | (Spain) Pepe Oriola | | | | | | | | | | | | | | | | | | | | | | | DNS | DNS | 0 |
| Pos. | Driver | MAR (Morocco) | | FRA (France) | | HUN (Hungary) | | SVK (Slovakia) | | AUT (Austria) | | RUS (Russia) | | BEL (Belgium) | | ARG (Argentina) | | CHN1 (China) | | CHN2 (China) | | JPN (Japan) | | MAC (Macau) | | Pts. |

| Colour | Result |
|---|---|
| Gold | Winner |
| Silver | Second place |
| Bronze | Third place |
| Green | Points classification |
| Blue | Non-points classification |
| Blue | Non-classified finish (NC) |
| Purple | Retired, not classified (Ret) |
| Red | Did not qualify (DNQ) |
| Red | Did not pre-qualify (DNPQ) |
| Black | Disqualified (DSQ) |
| White | Did not start (DNS) |
| White | Withdrew (WD) |
| White | Race cancelled (C) |
| Blank | Did not practice (DNP) |
| Blank | Did not arrive (DNA) |
| Blank | Excluded (EX) |

**Bold** – Pole
Italics – Fastest Lap

† – Drivers did not finish the race, but were classified as they completed over 75% of the race distance.

==== Manufacturers' Championship ====
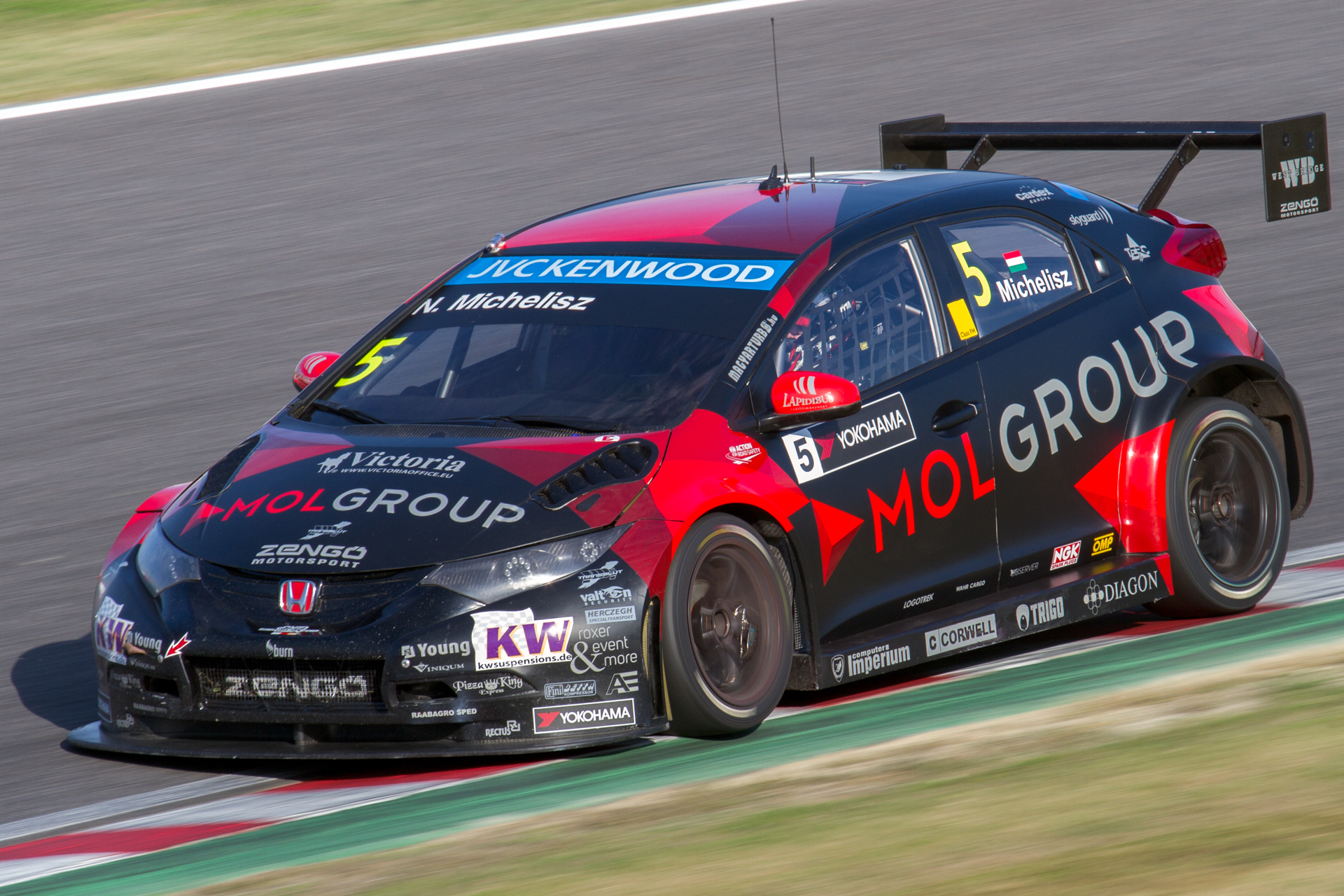
Honda placed second in the Manufacturers Championship with the Civic

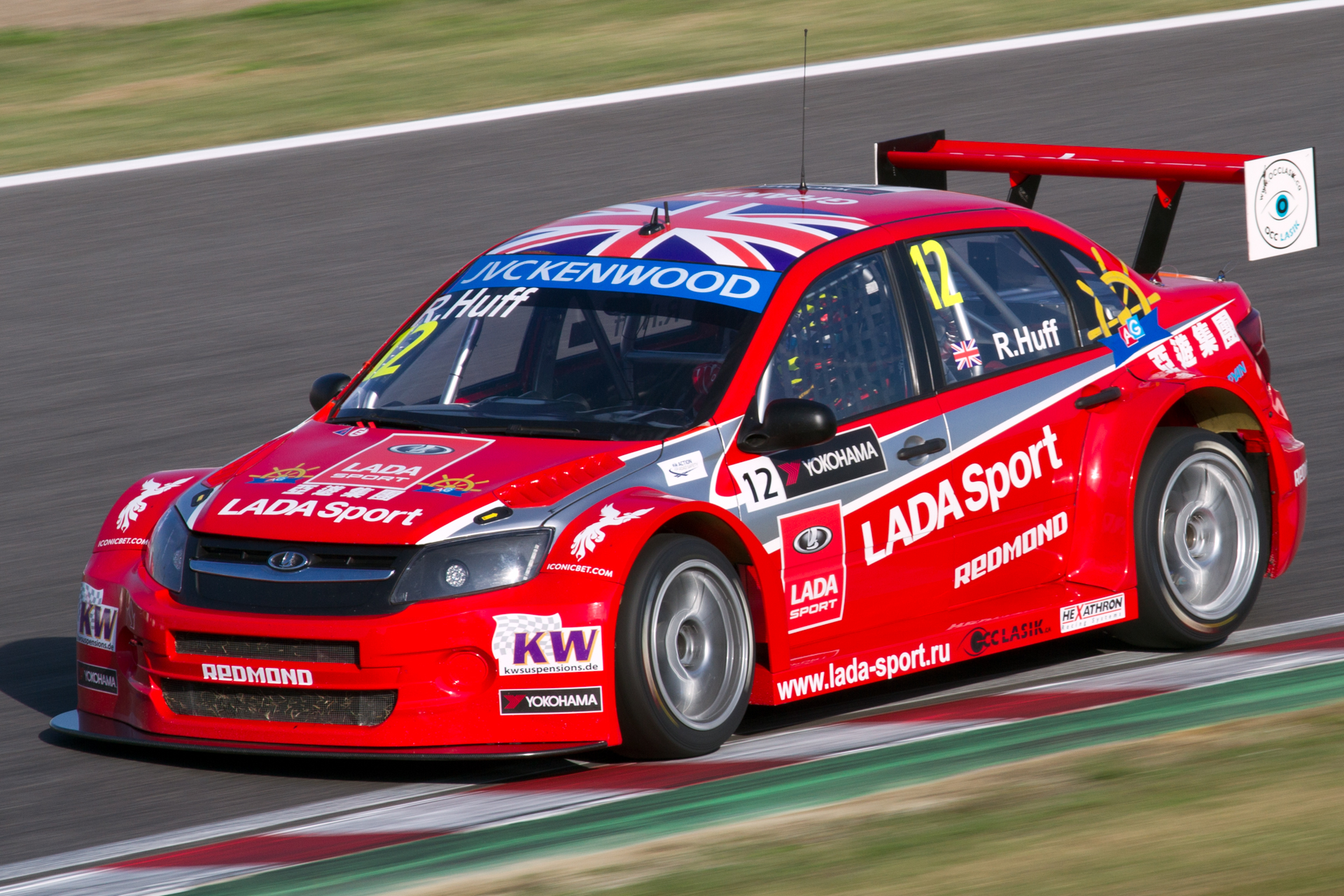
Lada placed third with the Granta

| Pos. | Manufacturer | MAR (Morocco) | | FRA (France) | | HUN (Hungary) | | SVK (Slovakia) | | AUT (Austria) | | RUS (Russia) | | BEL (Belgium) | | ARG (Argentina) | | CHN1 (China) | | CHN2 (China) | | JPN (Japan) | | MAC (Macau) | | Pts. |
|---|---|---|---|---|---|---|---|---|---|---|---|---|---|---|---|---|---|---|---|---|---|---|---|---|---|---|
| 1 | (France) Citroën | 1^{1} | 1 | 1^{1} | 1 | 1^{1} | 5 | 1^{1} | C | 1^{1} | 1 | 1^{1} | 1 | 1^{1} | 1 | 1^{1} | 1 | 2^{2} | 3 | 1^{1} | 3 | 1^{1} | 5 | 1^{1} | 2 | 1003 |
| 1 | (France) Citroën | 2^{2} | 2 | 2 | 2 | 2^{2} | 6 | 2^{2} | C | 3^{2} | 7 | 3^{4} | 2 | 2^{2} | 2 | 3^{2} | 3 | 3^{3} | 4 | 2^{2} | 5 | 3^{2} | 6 | 5^{2} | 5 | 1003 |
| 2 | (Japan) Honda | 5^{3} | 10† | 3^{2} | 3 | 3^{3} | 2 | 3^{3} | C | 5^{3} | 2 | 2^{2} | 3 | 6^{3} | 4 | 2^{3} | 4 | 6^{1} | 5 | 5^{3} | 1 | 4^{3} | 1 | 2^{3} | 4 | 710 |
| 2 | (Japan) Honda | 7^{4} | DNS | 7^{3} | 4 | 4^{4} | 8 | 7^{4} | C | 7^{4} | 3 | 7^{3} | 7 | 7^{4} | 7 | 5^{4} | 5 | 9^{4} | 10 | 6^{4} | 2 | 6^{4} | 3 | 3^{4} | 16† | 710 |
| 3 | (Russia) Lada | 10^{5} | 5 | 5^{4} | 11 | 11^{5} | 12 | 9^{5} | C | 12^{5} | 10 | 10^{5} | 12 | 14^{5} | 12 | 7^{5} | 2 | 7^{5} | 1 | 15†^{5} | 10 | 12^{5} | 11 | 9^{5} | 1 | 425 |
| 3 | (Russia) Lada | 11 | Ret | 10^{5} | 13 | Ret | Ret | Ret | C | 13 | Ret | 14 | Ret | 16 | 13 | 10 | 9 | 8 | 6 | Ret | 11 | 13 | 12 | 11 | 9 | 425 |
| Pos. | Manufacturer | MAR (Morocco) | | FRA (France) | | HUN (Hungary) | | SVK (Slovakia) | | AUT (Austria) | | RUS (Russia) | | BEL (Belgium) | | ARG (Argentina) | | CHN1 (China) | | CHN2 (China) | | JPN (Japan) | | MAC (Macau) | | Pts. |

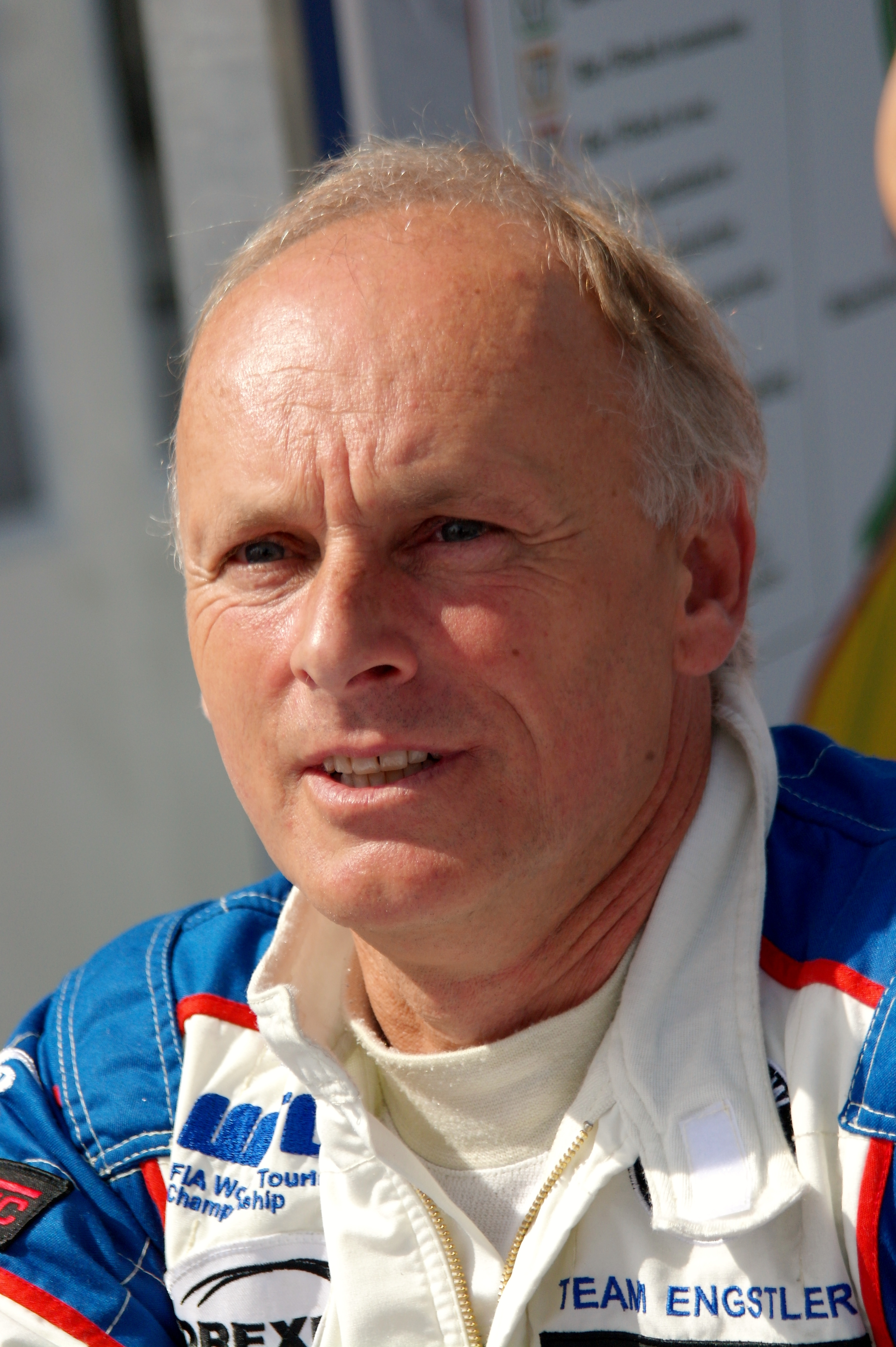
Franz Engstler won the Yokohama Drivers' Trophy

==== Yokohama Trophies ====
World Touring Car Championship promoter Eurosport Events organised the Yokohama Drivers' Trophy and the Yokohama Teams' Trophy within the 2014 FIA World Touring Car Championship.

===== Yokohama Drivers' Trophy =====
All TC2 entries were eligible for the Yokohama Drivers' Trophy.

| Pos. | Driver | MAR (Morocco) | | FRA (France) | | HUN (Hungary) | | SVK (Slovakia) | | AUT (Austria) | | RUS (Russia) | | BEL (Belgium) | | ARG (Argentina) | | CHN1 (China) | | CHN2 (China) | | JPN (Japan) | | MAC (Macau) | | Pts. |
|---|---|---|---|---|---|---|---|---|---|---|---|---|---|---|---|---|---|---|---|---|---|---|---|---|---|---|
| 1 | (Germany) Franz Engstler | **12** | **7** | 16 | 16 | 15 | 14 | **16** | C | **15** | **11** | **16** | **13** | **18** | **16** | **15** | **14** | **10** | **14** | **13** | **14** | **15** | **Ret** | **14** | **10** | 269 |
| 2 | (France) John Filippi | 14 | 8 | **18** | **Ret** | 16 | 16 | 18† | C | 16 | 13 | 18 | 15 | 19 | 19 | 16 | 15† | 13 | 15 | 14 | 15 | 16 | 14 | 16 | 12 | 175 |
| 3 | (Italy) Pasquale Di Sabatino | 13 | 9 | 17 | 17 | **14** | **15** | 17 | C | 17 | 12 | 17 | 14 | 21 | 17 | | | | | | | | | | | 98 |
| 4 | (Macau) Felipe De Souza | | | | | | | | | | | | | | | | | 14 | Ret | 16 | 16 | Ret | 15 | 17 | 13 | 38 |
| 5 | (Argentina) Camilo Echevarría | | | | | | | | | | | | | | | 17 | 16 | | | | | | | | | 12 |
| 6 | (Hungary) Norbert Nagy | | | | | | | | | | | | | 20 | 18 | | | | | | | | | | | 12 |
| 7 | (Hong Kong) Henry Kwong | | | | | | | | | | | | | | | | | | | | | 17 | NC | DSQ | 15 | 10 |
| 8 | (Czech Republic) Petr Fulín | DNS | DNS | | | | | 15 | C | | | | | | | | | | | | | | | | | 10 |
| 9 | (Macau) Mak Ka Lok | | | | | | | | | | | | | | | | | | | | | | | 18 | 14 | 10 |
| 10 | (Japan) Yukinori Taniguchi | | | | | 17 | 17 | | | | | | | | | | | | | | | | | | | 10 |
| 11 | (Russia) Nikita Misyulya | | | | | | | | | | | Ret | 16 | | | | | | | | | | | | | 5 |
| — | (Hong Kong) William Lok | | | | | | | | | | | | | | | | | | | Ret | DNS | | | Ret | DNS | 0 |
| — | (Hong Kong) Michael Soong | | | | | | | | | | | | | | | | | DNS | DNS | | | | | | | 0 |
| Pos. | Driver | MAR (Morocco) | | FRA (France) | | HUN (Hungary) | | SVK (Slovakia) | | AUT (Austria) | | RUS (Russia) | | BEL (Belgium) | | ARG (Argentina) | | CHN1 (China) | | CHN2 (China) | | JPN (Japan) | | MAC (Macau) | | Pts. |

| Colour | Result |
|---|---|
| Gold | Winner |
| Silver | Second place |
| Bronze | Third place |
| Green | Points classification |
| Blue | Non-points classification |
| Blue | Non-classified finish (NC) |
| Purple | Retired, not classified (Ret) |
| Red | Did not qualify (DNQ) |
| Red | Did not pre-qualify (DNPQ) |
| Black | Disqualified (DSQ) |
| White | Did not start (DNS) |
| White | Withdrew (WD) |
| White | Race cancelled (C) |
| Blank | Did not practice (DNP) |
| Blank | Did not arrive (DNA) |
| Blank | Excluded (EX) |

**Bold** – Pole
Italics – Fastest Lap

===== Yokohama Teams' Trophy =====
All non-manufacturer teams were eligible to score points towards the Yokohama Teams' Trophy.

| Pos. | Team | MAR (Morocco) | | FRA (France) | | HUN (Hungary) | | SVK (Slovakia) | | AUT (Austria) | | RUS (Russia) | | BEL (Belgium) | | ARG (Argentina) | | CHN1 (China) | | CHN2 (China) | | JPN (Japan) | | MAC (Macau) | | Pts. |
|---|---|---|---|---|---|---|---|---|---|---|---|---|---|---|---|---|---|---|---|---|---|---|---|---|---|---|
| 1 | (Italy) ROAL Motorsport | 4 | 4 | 9 | 15 | 8 | 4 | 4 | C | 2 | 5 | 5 | 4 | 5 | 3 | 6 | 10 | 1 | 2 | 8 | 6 | 2 | 4 | 7 | 7 | 255 |
| 1 | (Italy) ROAL Motorsport | Ret | Ret | WD | WD | 13 | 7 | 5 | C | 6 | Ret | 8 | 6 | 10 | 10 | 11 | Ret | 17† | 8 | Ret | 7 | 7 | 10 | 12 | 8 | 255 |
| 2 | (Hungary) Zengő Motorsport | 9 | DNS | 7 | 8 | 6 | 10 | 3 | C | 9 | 4 | 9 | 7 | 7 | 7 | 2 | 7 | 6 | 5 | 5 | 4 | 4 | 3 | 2 | 4 | 164 |
| 3 | (Spain) Campos Racing | 6 | 3 | 6 | 7 | 10 | 3 | 11 | C | 16 | 13 | 18 | 9 | 9 | 9 | 16 | 15† | 12 | 11 | 9 | 8 | 5 | 2 | 16 | 3 | 162 |
| 3 | (Spain) Campos Racing | 8 | 8 | 14 | 10 | 12 | 11 | 12 | C | NC | Ret | Ret | 11 | 12 | 18 | Ret | Ret | 13 | 15 | 12 | 9 | 8 | 14 | NC | 12 | 162 |
| 4 | (Germany) ALL-INKL.COM Münnich Motorsport | 15 | 6 | 11 | 9 | 9 | 1 | 6 | C | 10 | 6 | 12 | 8 | 4 | 6 | 12 | 12 | 4 | 7 | 11 | 13 | 10 | 8 | 10 | 11 | 156 |
| 4 | (Germany) ALL-INKL.COM Münnich Motorsport | Ret | Ret | 12 | 12 | 18 | 13 | 13 | C | 11 | 9 | 13 | 10 | 15 | 14 | 13 | 13 | Ret | DNS | 17† | Ret | NC | 16 | 15 | Ret | 156 |
| 5 | (Italy) Proteam Racing | 7 | DSQ | 13 | 5 | 5 | DNS | 14 | C | 7 | 8 | 11 | 3 | 13 | 11 | 9 | 8 | 9 | Ret | 10 | 1 | 11 | Ret | 19† | DNS | 97 |
| 6 | (Germany) Liqui Moly Team Engstler | 12 | 7 | 16 | 16 | 14 | 14 | 16 | C | 15 | 11 | 16 | 13 | 18 | 16 | 15 | 14 | 10 | 14 | 13 | 14 | 15 | 15 | 14 | 10 | 59 |
| 6 | (Germany) Liqui Moly Team Engstler | 13 | 9 | 17 | 17 | 15 | 15 | 17 | C | 17 | 12 | 17 | 14 | 21 | 17 | 17 | 16 | 14 | Ret | 16 | 16 | Ret | Ret | 17 | 13 | 59 |
| — | (Macau) RPM Racing Team | | | | | | | | | | | | | | | | | | | | | | | 18 | 14 | 0 |
| — | (Sweden) NIKA Racing | | | | | 17 | 17 | | | | | | | | | | | | | | | | | | | 0 |
| Pos. | Team | MAR (Morocco) | | FRA (France) | | HUN (Hungary) | | SVK (Slovakia) | | AUT (Austria) | | RUS (Russia) | | BEL (Belgium) | | ARG (Argentina) | | CHN1 (China) | | CHN2 (China) | | JPN (Japan) | | MAC (Macau) | | Pts. |

† – Drivers did not finish the race, but were classified as they completed over 75% of the race distance.

===== Yokohama Performer of the year =====
| Pos. | Driver | FL |
|---|---|---|
| 1 | (Argentina) José María López | 11 |
| 2 | (France) Yvan Muller | 3 |
| 3 | (France) Sébastien Loeb | 2 |
| 3 | (Italy) Gabriele Tarquini | 2 |
| 4 | (United Kingdom) Tom Chilton | 1 |
| 4 | (China) Ma Qing Hua | 1 |
| 4 | (United Kingdom) Robert Huff | 1 |
| 4 | (Portugal) Tiago Monteiro | 1 |
| 4 | (France) Hugo Valente | 1 |

===== Eurosport Asia Trophy =====
| Pos. | Driver | CHN1 (China) | | CHN2 (China) | | JPN (Japan) | | MAC (Macau) | | Pts. |
|---|---|---|---|---|---|---|---|---|---|---|
| 1 | (Macau) Felipe De Souza | 14 | Ret | 16 | 16 | Ret | 15 | 17 | 13 | 60 |
| 2 | (Macau) Mak Ka Lok | | | | | | | 18 | 14 | 16 |
| 3 | (Hong Kong) Henry Kwong | | | | | 17 | NC | DSQ | 15 | 16 |
| — | (Hong Kong) William Lok | | | Ret | DNS | | | Ret | DNS | 0 |
| — | (Hong Kong) Michael Soong | DNS | DNS | | | | | | | 0 |
| Pos. | Driver | CHN1 (China) | | CHN2 (China) | | JPN (Japan) | | MAC (Macau) | | Pts. |
