= 2014 FIA WTCC Race of Hungary =

Race details
- Round 3 of 12 in the 2014 World Touring Car Championship at Hungaroring in Mogyoród, Hungary.
- Date: 4 May, 2014
- Location: Mogyoród, Hungary
- Course: Hungaroring; 4.381 kilometres (2.722 mi)

Race One
- Laps: 14
Pole position
| Driver | | (France) Yvan Muller | Citroën Total WTCC |
| Time | | 1:48.727 | |
Podium
| First | | (France) Yvan Muller | Citroën Total WTCC |
| Second | | (Argentina) José María López | Citroën Total WTCC |
| Third | | (Portugal) Tiago Monteiro | Castrol Honda Team |
Fastest Lap
| Driver | | (France) Yvan Muller | Citroën Total WTCC |
| Time | | 1:50.119 | |

Race Two
- Laps: 14
Podium
| First | | (Italy) Gianni Morbidelli | Münnich Motorsport |
| Second | | (Portugal) Tiago Monteiro | Castrol Honda Team |
| Third | | (France) Hugo Valente | Campos Racing |
Fastest Lap
| Driver | | (Portugal) Tiago Monteiro | Castrol Honda Team |
| Time | | 1:51.088 | |

The 2014 FIA WTCC Race of Hungary was the third round of the 2014 World Touring Car Championship season and the fourth running of the FIA WTCC Race of Hungary. It was held on 4 May 2014 at the Hungaroring in Mogyoród near Budapest, Hungary.

Race one was won by Yvan Muller for Citroën Total WTCC and race two was won by Gianni Morbidelli for ALL–INKL.com Münnich Motorsport.

== Background ==
After two rounds, José María López led the drivers' championship by twelve points over teammate Sébastien Loeb. Franz Engstler held the lead of the Yokohama Trophy.

The compensation weight system came into effect for the third round of the championship. The Chevrolet RML Cruze TC1, Honda Civic WTCC and Lada Granta 1.6T all remained at the base weight of 1,100 kilograms (2,425 lb). The Citroën C-Elysée WTCC gained 60 kilograms (132 lb) to bring it up to 1,160 kilograms (2,557 lb).

Tom Coronel returned after being forced to miss the Race of France due to damage sustained to his Chevrolet Cruze at the opening round of the season. After initially expecting to miss the practice sessions while final repairs were made, Coronel was able to take part in Friday testing. NIKA Racing entered a TC2 Honda Civic for Yukinori Taniguchi who will be racing at selected events in 2014.

== Report ==
=== Testing and free practice ===
Gabriele Tarquini led a Honda 1–2–3 in Friday testing, Mehdi Bennani in the Proteam Racing–run car was second with Tiago Monteiro third.

López set the pace in free practice one on a drying track. Yvan Muller was second fastest but 1.2 seconds off the time set by his teammate, while Tom Chilton was third in the ROAL Motorsport Chevrolet.

Yvan Muller led a Citroën 1–2–3 in free practice two, Bennani in fourth was the highest placed Honda and Chilton in sixth was the fastest Chevrolet.

=== Qualifying ===
López was quickest in the first part of qualifying with Bennani and Muller having topped the times earlier on in the session. Robert Huff had been close to making it through to Q2 but he was knocked out of the top twelve following a late improvement by Hugo Valente. Pasquale di Sabatino took pole position in the TC2 class.

Tarquini set the benchmark time in Q2 and ensured he would progress through to Q3. López was second, Monteiro third and Muller and Loeb taking the last two spots for the final part of qualifying. Bennani missed out on Q3 due to Monteiro's late improvement while Valente and Michelisz spoiled their lap times with mistakes, ending the session 11th and 12th respectively. Dušan Borković finished tenth to secure pole position for race two.

Muller claimed pole in the Q3 shootout at the head of a Citroën 1–2–3 while Monteiro was the best of the Castrol Honda World Touring Car Team pair who ended up fourth and fifth.

The Campos Racing car of Borković failed the ride height test in post–qualifying scrutineering and had all of his qualifying times disallowed, sending him to the back of the grid for both races. This moved Valente up to pole position for race two.

=== Race One ===
Monteiro and Tarquini passed Loeb at the start while Muller kept ahead of López. Loeb lost further places to Bennani and Michelisz who had moved up from 11th on the grid on the opening lap. Chilton and Coronel had slight contact early on and on lap three, Chilton was shown a black and orange flag for his loose bonnet. By the midpoint of the race the Lukoil Lada Sport cars of Huff and Thompson were under threat from the Campos Racing cars of Valente and Borković. Morbidelli had passed the Lada pair earlier and now fellow Chevrolet racers Valente and Borkovic were trying to pass. A slide from Huff on lap nine opened up a gap for Valente to pass. After 14 laps Muller led a Citroën 1–2 with Monteiro taking the final podium place. Di Sabatino won in the TC2 class.

=== Race Two ===
Morbidelli got a better start than Valente who also lost out to Monteiro at the start. There was slight contact between Coronel and the best placed Citroën of Muller; Muller dived up the inside of Coronel at the start of the second lap although Coronel made the switch back to retain fourth place. By lap seven Coronel was still keeping Muller and Lopez behind, allowing Morbidelli, Monteiro and Valente to break away from the rest of the field. Monteiro was by now putting Morbidelli under pressure for first place. On lap twelve Muller began to come under pressure from López which reduced the pressure on Coronel ahead of them, the trio had spent much of the race running together. Morbidelli made a mistake on the final lap at the turn six chicane, Monteiro closed up and Valente also tried to have a go at Monteiro although no positions changed. Morbidelli crossed the finish line to claim his first win for ALL–INKL.com Münnich Motorsport ahead of Monteiro and Valente. Coronel held off Muller all the way to the end to finish fourth. Engstler was victor in the TC2 class.

Prior to the Race of Austria, Lukoil Lada Sport's James Thompson was disqualified from the previous three races after the seal on his engine was found to have been broken without permission. This included both races in Hungary and the race in Slovakia.

== Results ==
=== Qualifying ===
| Pos. | No. | Name | Team | Car | C | Q1 | Q2 | Q3 | Points |
|---|---|---|---|---|---|---|---|---|---|
| 1 | 1 | (France) Yvan Muller | Citroën Total WTCC | Citroën C-Elysée WTCC | TC1 | 1:49.393 | 1:49.546 | 1:48.727 | **5** |
| 2 | 37 | (Argentina) José María López | Citroën Total WTCC | Citroën C-Elysée WTCC | TC1 | 1:49.328 | 1:49.496 | 1:48.761 | **4** |
| 3 | 9 | (France) Sébastien Loeb | Citroën Total WTCC | Citroën C-Elysée WTCC | TC1 | 1:49.552 | 1:49.652 | 1:49.113 | **3** |
| 4 | 18 | (Portugal) Tiago Monteiro | Castrol Honda World Touring Car Team | Honda Civic WTCC | TC1 | 1:49.668 | 1:49.497 | 1:49.166 | **2** |
| 5 | 2 | (Italy) Gabriele Tarquini | Castrol Honda World Touring Car Team | Honda Civic WTCC | TC1 | 1:50.065 | 1:49.410 | 1:50.576 | **1** |
| 6 | 25 | (Morocco) Mehdi Bennani | Proteam Racing | Honda Civic WTCC | TC1 | 1:50.017 | 1:49.745 | | |
| 7 | 3 | (United Kingdom) Tom Chilton | ROAL Motorsport | Chevrolet RML Cruze TC1 | TC1 | 1:49.634 | 1:49.757 | | |
| 8 | 4 | (Netherlands) Tom Coronel | ROAL Motorsport | Chevrolet RML Cruze TC1 | TC1 | 1:50.234 | 1:50.428 | | |
| 9 | 10 | (Italy) Gianni Morbidelli | ALL-INKL.COM Münnich Motorsport | Chevrolet RML Cruze TC1 | TC1 | 1:50.234 | 1:50.728 | | |
| 10 | 7 | (France) **Hugo Valente** | Campos Racing | Chevrolet RML Cruze TC1 | TC1 | 1:50.561 | 1:52.123 | | |
| 11 | 5 | (Hungary) Norbert Michelisz | Zengő Motorsport | Honda Civic WTCC | TC1 | 1:49.421 | | | |
| 12 | 12 | (United Kingdom) Robert Huff | Lukoil Lada Sport | Lada Granta 1.6T | TC1 | 1:50.908 | | | |
| 13 | 11 | (United Kingdom) James Thompson | Lukoil Lada Sport | Lada Granta 1.6T | TC1 | 1:50.995 | | | |
| 14 | 77 | (Germany) René Münnich | ALL-INKL.COM Münnich Motorsport | Chevrolet RML Cruze TC1 | TC1 | 1:51.123 | | | |
| 15 | 14 | (Russia) Mikhail Kozlovskiy | Lukoil Lada Sport | Lada Granta 1.6T | TC1 | 1:52.451 | | | |
| 16 | 8 | (Italy) Pasquale Di Sabatino | Liqui Moly Team Engstler | BMW 320 TC | TC2T | 1:54.584 | | | |
| 17 | 6 | (Germany) Franz Engstler | Liqui Moly Team Engstler | BMW 320 TC | TC2T | 1:55.121 | | | |
| 18 | 99 | (Japan) Yukinori Taniguchi | NIKA Racing | Honda Civic WTCC | TC2T | 1:56.561 | | | |
| 19 | 27 | (France) John Filippi | Campos Racing | SEAT León WTCC | TC2T | 1:56.588 | | | |
107% time: 1:56.980
| EX^{1} | 98 | (Serbia) Dušan Borković | Campos Racing | Chevrolet RML Cruze TC1 | TC1 | Excluded | | | |

- **Bold** denotes Pole position for second race.

^1 — After failing the ride height check after qualifying, Borković had all his qualifying times disallowed.

=== Race 1 ===
| Pos. | No. | Name | Team | Car | C | Laps | Time/Retired | Grid | Points |
|---|---|---|---|---|---|---|---|---|---|
| 1 | 1 | (France) **Yvan Muller** | Citroën Total WTCC | Citroën C-Elysée WTCC | TC1 | 14 | 25:57.292 | 1 | 25 |
| 2 | 37 | (Argentina) José María López | Citroën Total WTCC | Citroën C-Elysée WTCC | TC1 | 14 | +1.282 | 2 | 18 |
| 3 | 18 | (Portugal) Tiago Monteiro | Castrol Honda World Touring Car Team | Honda Civic WTCC | TC1 | 14 | +8.961 | 4 | 15 |
| 4 | 2 | (Italy) Gabriele Tarquini | Castrol Honda World Touring Car Team | Honda Civic WTCC | TC1 | 14 | +13.980 | 5 | 12 |
| 5 | 25 | (Morocco) Mehdi Bennani | Proteam Racing | Honda Civic WTCC | TC1 | 14 | +14.747 | 6 | 10 |
| 6 | 5 | (Hungary) Norbert Michelisz | Zengő Motorsport | Honda Civic WTCC | TC1 | 14 | +16.672 | 11 | 8 |
| 7 | 9 | (France) Sébastien Loeb | Citroën Total WTCC | Citroën C-Elysée WTCC | TC1 | 14 | +17.475 | 3 | 6 |
| 8 | 4 | (Netherlands) Tom Coronel | ROAL Motorsport | Chevrolet RML Cruze TC1 | TC1 | 14 | +22.863 | 8 | 4 |
| 9 | 10 | (Italy) Gianni Morbidelli | ALL-INKL.COM Münnich Motorsport | Chevrolet RML Cruze TC1 | TC1 | 14 | +27.891 | 9 | 2 |
| 10 | 7 | (France) Hugo Valente | Campos Racing | Chevrolet RML Cruze TC1 | TC1 | 14 | +36.287 | 10 | 1 |
| 11 | 12 | (United Kingdom) Robert Huff | Lukoil Lada Sport | Lada Granta 1.6T | TC1 | 14 | +42.968 | 12 | |
| 12 | 98 | (Serbia) Dušan Borković | Campos Racing | Chevrolet RML Cruze TC1 | TC1 | 14 | +43.715 | 20 | |
| 13 | 3 | (United Kingdom) Tom Chilton | ROAL Motorsport | Chevrolet RML Cruze TC1 | TC1 | 14 | +55.861 | 7 | |
| 14 | 8 | (Italy) Pasquale Di Sabatino | Liqui Moly Team Engstler | BMW 320 TC | TC2T | 14 | +1:23.040 | 16 | |
| 15 | 6 | (Germany) Franz Engstler | Liqui Moly Team Engstler | BMW 320 TC | TC2T | 14 | +1:23.757 | 17 | |
| 16 | 27 | (France) John Filippi | Campos Racing | SEAT León WTCC | TC2T | 14 | +1:48.371 | 19 | |
| 17 | 99 | (Japan) Yukinori Taniguchi | NIKA Racing | Honda Civic WTCC | TC2T | 14 | +1:48.877 | 18 | |
| 18 | 77 | (Germany) René Münnich | ALL-INKL.COM Münnich Motorsport | Chevrolet RML Cruze TC1 | TC1 | 13 | +1 lap | 14 | |
| Ret | 14 | (Russia) Mikhail Kozlovskiy | Lukoil Lada Sport | Lada Granta 1.6T | TC1 | 4 | Overheating | 15 | |
| DSQ | 11 | (United Kingdom) James Thompson | Lukoil Lada Sport | Lada Granta 1.6T | TC1 | 14 | Disqualified | 13 | |

- **Bold** denotes Fastest lap.

=== Race 2 ===
| Pos. | No. | Name | Team | Car | C | Laps | Time/Retired | Grid | Points |
|---|---|---|---|---|---|---|---|---|---|
| 1 | 10 | (Italy) Gianni Morbidelli | ALL-INKL.COM Münnich Motorsport | Chevrolet RML Cruze TC1 | TC1 | 14 | 26:15.851 | 2 | 25 |
| 2 | 18 | (Portugal) **Tiago Monteiro** | Castrol Honda World Touring Car Team | Honda Civic WTCC | TC1 | 14 | +0.350 | 7 | 18 |
| 3 | 7 | (France) Hugo Valente | Campos Racing | Chevrolet RML Cruze TC1 | TC1 | 14 | +1.206 | 1 | 15 |
| 4 | 4 | (Netherlands) Tom Coronel | ROAL Motorsport | Chevrolet RML Cruze TC1 | TC1 | 14 | +5.104 | 3 | 12 |
| 5 | 1 | (France) Yvan Muller | Citroën Total WTCC | Citroën C-Elysée WTCC | TC1 | 14 | +5.435 | 10 | 10 |
| 6 | 37 | (Argentina) José María López | Citroën Total WTCC | Citroën C-Elysée WTCC | TC1 | 14 | +5.605 | 9 | 8 |
| 7 | 3 | (United Kingdom) Tom Chilton | ROAL Motorsport | Chevrolet RML Cruze TC1 | TC1 | 14 | +6.306 | 4 | 6 |
| 8 | 2 | (Italy) Gabriele Tarquini | Castrol Honda World Touring Car Team | Honda Civic WTCC | TC1 | 14 | +7.828 | 6 | 4 |
| 9 | 9 | (France) Sébastien Loeb | Citroën Total WTCC | Citroën C-Elysée WTCC | TC1 | 14 | +8.308 | 8 | 2 |
| 10 | 5 | (Hungary) Norbert Michelisz | Zengő Motorsport | Honda Civic WTCC | TC1 | 14 | +8.842 | 11 | 1 |
| 11 | 98 | (Serbia) Dušan Borković | Campos Racing | Chevrolet RML Cruze TC1 | TC1 | 14 | +11.724 | 19 | |
| 12 | 12 | (United Kingdom) Robert Huff | Lukoil Lada Sport | Lada Granta 1.6T | TC1 | 14 | +21.487 | 12 | |
| 13 | 77 | (Germany) René Münnich | ALL-INKL.COM Münnich Motorsport | Chevrolet RML Cruze TC1 | TC1 | 14 | +23.210 | 14 | |
| 14 | 6 | (Germany) Franz Engstler | Liqui Moly Team Engstler | BMW 320 TC | TC2T | 14 | +55.381 | 16 | |
| 15 | 8 | (Italy) Pasquale Di Sabatino | Liqui Moly Team Engstler | BMW 320 TC | TC2T | 14 | +59.926 | 15 | |
| 16 | 27 | (France) John Filippi | Campos Racing | SEAT León WTCC | TC2T | 14 | +1:19.313 | 18 | |
| 17 | 99 | (Japan) Yukinori Taniguchi | NIKA Racing | Honda Civic WTCC | TC2T | 12 | +2 laps | 17 | |
| Ret | 14 | (Russia) Mikhail Kozlovskiy | Lukoil Lada Sport | Lada Granta 1.6T | TC1 | 3 | Overheating | 20 | |
| DSQ | 11 | (United Kingdom) James Thompson | Lukoil Lada Sport | Lada Granta 1.6T | TC1 | 14 | Disqualified | 13 | |

- **Bold** denotes Fastest lap.

== Standings after the event ==
Drivers' Championship standings

| | Pos | Driver | Points |
|---|---|---|---|
| | 1 | (Argentina) José María López | 115 |
| 1 | 2 | (France) Yvan Muller | 105 |
| 1 | 3 | (France) Sébastien Loeb | 84 |
| 2 | 4 | (Portugal) Tiago Monteiro | 65 |
| 1 | 5 | (Italy) Gabriele Tarquini | 48 |

Yokohama Trophy standings

| Pos | Driver | Points |
|---|---|---|
| 1 | (Germany) Franz Engstler | 65 |
| 2 | (Italy) Pasquale Di Sabatino | 49 |
| 3 | (France) John Filippi | 33 |
| 4 | (Japan) Yukinori Taniguchi | 10 |

Manufacturers' Championship standings

| Pos | Manufacturer | Points |
|---|---|---|
| 1 | (France) Citroën | 271 |
| 2 | (Japan) Honda | 172 |
| 3 | (Russia) Lada | 96 |

- Note: Only the top five positions are included for both sets of drivers' standings.
