= 2014 FIA WTCC Race of China, Shanghai =

Race details
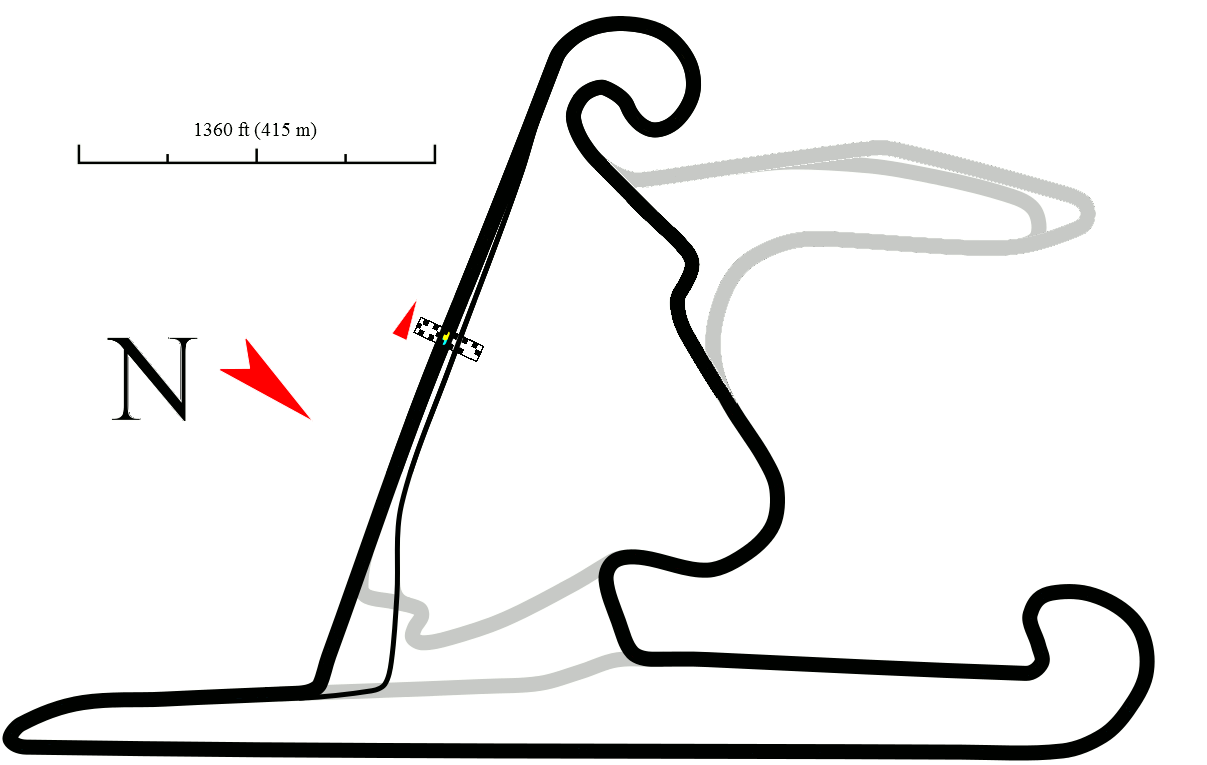
- Round 10 of 12 in the 2014 World Touring Car Championship at Shanghai International Circuit in Shanghai, China.
- Date: 12 October, 2014
- Location: Shanghai, China
- Course: Shanghai International Circuit; 4.603 kilometres (2.860 mi)

Race One
- Laps: 14
Pole position
Driver		(Argentina) José María López	Citroën Total WTCC
Time		1:48.782	
Podium
First		(Argentina) José María López	Citroën Total WTCC
Second		(China) Ma Qing Hua	Citroën Total WTCC
Third		(France) Yvan Muller	Citroën Total WTCC
Fastest Lap
Driver		(China) Ma Qing Hua	Citroën Total WTCC
Time		1:50.833	

Race Two
- Laps: 14
Podium
First		(Morocco) Mehdi Bennani	Proteam Racing
Second		(Portugal) Tiago Monteiro	Castrol Honda WTCT
Third		(Argentina) José María López	Citroën Total WTCC
Fastest Lap
Driver		(Italy) Gabriele Tarquini	Castrol Honda WTCT
Time		1:51.316	

The 2014 FIA WTCC Race of China, Shanghai was the tenth round of the 2014 World Touring Car Championship season and the fifth running of the FIA WTCC Race of China. It was the second of two rounds held in China in 2014, the first having taken place at the Goldenport Park Circuit in Beijing the previous weekend. It was held on 12 October 2014 at the Shanghai International Circuit in Shanghai, China.

Race one was won by José María López for Citroën Total WTCC and race two was won by Mehdi Bennani for Proteam Racing. Victory for Bennani in race two was the first for a Moroccan driver in an FIA–sanctioned race. Citroën secured the manufacturers' title for first time while Franz Engstler wrapped–up the Yokohama Trophy.

== Background ==
López led the drivers' championship coming into the round, sixty–six points ahead of teammate Yvan Muller. Franz Engstler held the lead of the Yokohama Trophy.

William Lok replaced Michael Soong at Campos Racing as planned, joining regular driver John Filippi.

When the compensation weights were revised after the previous round; the Citroën C-Elysée WTCC retained the maximum ballast to keep their weight at 1,160 kilograms (2,557 lb). The Honda Civic WTCCs lost 10 kilograms (22 lb) of ballast to weigh–in at 1,120 kilograms (2,469 lb) and the Chevrolet RML Cruze TC1s gained 20 kilograms (44 lb) to drop their weight to 1,140 kilograms (2,513 lb). The Lada Granta 1.6Ts remained at the base weight of 1,100 kilograms (2,425 lb).

== Report ==
=== Testing and free practice ===
López and Muller were 1–2 in Fridays test session.

Muller was quickest in the foggy conditions of free practice one on Saturday morning, the Hondas of Gabriele Tarquini and Tiago Monteiro separated the four Citroëns in the top–six.

Ma Qing Hua led a Citroën 1–2–3 in free practice two. The session had been briefly interrupted by yellow flags for Lok's Campos SEAT which had gone off at the first corner.

=== Qualifying ===
Ma was quickest in the first part of qualifying with him and his Citroën teammates filling the first four positions. Gianni Morbidelli was the first driver to miss out on a place in Q2 while all three Lada Sport cars missed out on Q2 with James Thompson the quickest of them in 14th.

Citroën was 1–2–3–4 once again in Q2 with Muller the quickest ahead of López, Ma and Sébastien Loeb. Zengő Motorsport's Norbert Michelisz was the fifth driver to through to the Q3 superpole session. Mehdi Bennani finished tenth to take pole position on the reversed race two grid, taking the place in the final moments of qualifying from Tom Coronel who had returned to the pit lane early.

López took pole with his Q3 lap one–tenth better than that of Ma's. Muller was third with Michelisz spoiling a perfect result for Citroën ahead of fifth placed Loeb.

=== Race One ===
At the start Muller had to defend his third place from Michelisz, behind them the two factory Hondas of Monteiro and Tarquini were fighting over fifth place with Tarquini edging ahead. On the back straight Monteiro was under attack from Loeb although it would be on the following lap where Loeb would move ahead of Monteiro. On lap three the right rear wheel of eighth placed Tom Chilton's car came off and he was out of the race. On lap four Loeb was chasing Michelisz for fourth place, benefiting from the extra straight line speed of the Citroën on the back straight. Loeb passed Michelisz at the end of lap six to make it four Citroëns in the first four places. Double waved yellow flags were shown at the final corner near the end of the race when Lok went off at the final corner with broken suspension which left his SEAT in the gravel on the outside of the pit straight. Robert Huff slowed with a puncture on the last lap as López led a Citroën 1–2–3–4 to secure the first World Touring Car Championship manufacturers' title for the French team. Franz Engstler finished first in the TC2 class to secure the Yokohama Trophy title.

=== Race Two ===
Bennani started on pole position and retained the lead at the start while fellow front row starter Hugo Valente dropped back behind Tarquini and Monteiro. After the first few corners Bennani was starting to break away from the rest of the field who were bunched up behind Valente. On lap two Loeb made contact with Muller at the final hairpin while attempting a pass, breaking Muller's right–rear suspension in the process and the reigning champion peeled off into the pits to retire his car. On lap five Huff stopped at the side of the circuit after turn two following contact with Gianni Morbidelli who was later given a drive–through penalty for causing the collision. On the same lap Tarquini started to slow with technical problems promoting Monteiro to second as López moved into third at the expense of Valente. On lap six Loeb went up the inside of Valente at the final hairpin but it was on the following lap that he could make that move stick. Bennani held on to claim his first outright win in the WTCC with Monteiro second and López third.

After the race Loeb was given a 30–second time penalty for the incident with Muller, dropping him from fourth to twelfth in the final classification.

== Results ==
=== Qualifying ===
Pos.	No.	Name	Team	Car	C	Q1	Q2	Q3	Points
1	37	(Argentina) José María López	Citroën Total WTCC	Citroën C-Elysée WTCC	**TC1**	1:49.546	1:49.418	1:48.782	**5**
2	33	(China) Ma Qing Hua	Citroën Total WTCC	Citroën C-Elysée WTCC	**TC1**	1:49.313	1:49.436	1:48.898	**4**
3	1	(France) Yvan Muller	Citroën Total WTCC	Citroën C-Elysée WTCC	**TC1**	1:49.514	1:49.299	1:49.424	**3**
4	5	(Hungary) Norbert Michelisz	Zengő Motorsport	Honda Civic WTCC	**TC1**	1:50.312	1:49.848	1:49.681	**2**
5	9	(France) Sébastien Loeb	Citroën Total WTCC	Citroën C-Elysée WTCC	**TC1**	1:49.875	1:49.579	1:49.830	**1**
6	18	(Portugal) Tiago Monteiro	Castrol Honda World Touring Car Team	Honda Civic WTCC	**TC1**	1:50.657	1:50.178		
7	2	(Italy) Gabriele Tarquini	Castrol Honda World Touring Car Team	Honda Civic WTCC	**TC1**	1:50.266	1:50.229		
8	3	(United Kingdom) Tom Chilton	ROAL Motorsport	Chevrolet RML Cruze TC1	**TC1**	1:50.229	1:50.351		
9	7	(France) Hugo Valente	Campos Racing	Chevrolet RML Cruze TC1	**TC1**	1:51.300	1:50.406		
10	25	(Morocco) **Mehdi Bennani**	Proteam Racing	Honda Civic WTCC	**TC1**	1:50.782	1:50.528		
11	4	(Netherlands) Tom Coronel	ROAL Motorsport	Chevrolet RML Cruze TC1	**TC1**	1:50.694	1:50.548		
12	98	(Serbia) Dušan Borković	Campos Racing	Chevrolet RML Cruze TC1	**TC1**	1:50.867	1:51.665		
13	10	(Italy) Gianni Morbidelli	ALL-INKL.COM Münnich Motorsport	Chevrolet RML Cruze TC1	**TC1**	1:51.655			
14	11	(United Kingdom) James Thompson	Lukoil Lada Sport	Lada Granta 1.6T	**TC1**	1:51.662			
15	12	(United Kingdom) Robert Huff	Lukoil Lada Sport	Lada Granta 1.6T	**TC1**	1:51.781			
16	14	(Russia) Mikhail Kozlovskiy	Lukoil Lada Sport	Lada Granta 1.6T	**TC1**	1:51.953			
17	77	(Germany) René Münnich	ALL-INKL.COM Münnich Motorsport	Chevrolet RML Cruze TC1	**TC1**	1:52.393			
18	6	(Germany) Franz Engstler	Liqui Moly Team Engstler	BMW 320 TC	**TC2T**	1:55.315			
19	27	(France) John Filippi	Campos Racing	SEAT León WTCC	**TC2T**	1:56.753			
20	38	(Hong Kong) William Lok	Campos Racing	SEAT León WTCC	**TC2T** **A**	1:58.664			
21	26	(Macau) Felipe De Souza	Liqui Moly Team Engstler	BMW 320 TC	**TC2T** **A**	1:58.719			

- **Bold** denotes Pole position for second race.

=== Race 1 ===
Pos.	No.	Name	Team	Car	C	Laps	Time/Retired	Grid	Points
1	37	(Argentina) José María López	Citroën Total WTCC	Citroën C-Elysée WTCC	**TC1**	14	26:15.097	1	25
2	33	(China) **Ma Qing Hua**	Citroën Total WTCC	Citroën C-Elysée WTCC	**TC1**	14	+2.089	2	18
3	1	(France) Yvan Muller	Citroën Total WTCC	Citroën C-Elysée WTCC	**TC1**	14	+5.793	3	15
4	9	(France) Sébastien Loeb	Citroën Total WTCC	Citroën C-Elysée WTCC	**TC1**	14	+6.175	5	12
5	5	(Hungary) Norbert Michelisz	Zengő Motorsport	Honda Civic WTCC	**TC1**	14	+16.050	4	10
6	2	(Italy) Gabriele Tarquini	Castrol Honda World Touring Car Team	Honda Civic WTCC	**TC1**	14	+16.483	7	8
7	18	(Portugal) Tiago Monteiro	Castrol Honda World Touring Car Team	Honda Civic WTCC	**TC1**	14	+18.295	6	6
8	4	(Netherlands) Tom Coronel	ROAL Motorsport	Chevrolet RML Cruze TC1	**TC1**	14	+22.058	11	4
9	7	(France) Hugo Valente	Campos Racing	Chevrolet RML Cruze TC1	**TC1**	14	+25.896	9	2
10	25	(Morocco) Mehdi Bennani	Proteam Racing	Honda Civic WTCC	**TC1**	14	+26.278	10	1
11	10	(Italy) Gianni Morbidelli	ALL-INKL.COM Münnich Motorsport	Chevrolet RML Cruze TC1	**TC1**	14	+47.194	13	
12	98	(Serbia) Dušan Borković	Campos Racing	Chevrolet RML Cruze TC1	**TC1**	14	+53.710	12	
13	6	(Germany) Franz Engstler	Liqui Moly Team Engstler	BMW 320 TC	**TC2T**	14	+1:29.282	18	
14	27	(France) John Filippi	Campos Racing	SEAT León WTCC	**TC2T**	14	+1:43.122	19	
15	12	(United Kingdom) Robert Huff	Lukoil Lada Sport	Lada Granta 1.6T	**TC1**	13	+1 Lap	15	
16	26	(Macau) Felipe De Souza	Liqui Moly Team Engstler	BMW 320 TC	**TC2T** **A**	13	+1 Lap	21	
17	77	(Germany) René Münnich	ALL-INKL.COM Münnich Motorsport	Chevrolet RML Cruze TC1	**TC1**	10	+4 Laps	17	
Ret	14	(Russia) Mikhail Kozlovskiy	Lukoil Lada Sport	Lada Granta 1.6T	**TC1**	6	Retired	16	
Ret	38	(Hong Kong) William Lok	Campos Racing	SEAT León WTCC	**TC2T** **A**	5	Suspension	20	
Ret	3	(United Kingdom) Tom Chilton	ROAL Motorsport	Chevrolet RML Cruze TC1	**TC1**	2	Wheel	8	
Ret	11	(United Kingdom) James Thompson	Lukoil Lada Sport	Lada Granta 1.6T	**TC1**	0	Wheel	14	

Bold denotes Fastest lap.

=== Race 2 ===
Pos.	No.	Name	Team	Car	C	Laps	Time/Retired	Grid	Points
1	25	(Morocco) Mehdi Bennani	Proteam Racing	Honda Civic WTCC	**TC1**	14	26:21.882	1	25
2	18	(Portugal) Tiago Monteiro	Castrol Honda World Touring Car Team	Honda Civic WTCC	**TC1**	14	+2.590	5	18
3	37	(Argentina) José María López	Citroën Total WTCC	Citroën C-Elysée WTCC	**TC1**	14	+4.041	10	15
4	5	(Hungary) Norbert Michelisz	Zengő Motorsport	Honda Civic WTCC	**TC1**	14	+13.976	7	12
5	33	(China) Ma Qing Hua	Citroën Total WTCC	Citroën C-Elysée WTCC	**TC1**	14	+14.416	9	10
6	4	(Netherlands) Tom Coronel	ROAL Motorsport	Chevrolet RML Cruze TC1	**TC1**	14	+21.725	11	8
7	3	(United Kingdom) Tom Chilton	ROAL Motorsport	Chevrolet RML Cruze TC1	**TC1**	14	+22.933	3^{1}	6
8	7	(France) Hugo Valente	Campos Racing	Chevrolet RML Cruze TC1	**TC1**	14	+27.276	2	4
9	98	(Serbia) Dušan Borković	Campos Racing	Chevrolet RML Cruze TC1	**TC1**	14	+27.855	12	2
10	11	(United Kingdom) James Thompson	Lukoil Lada Sport	Lada Granta 1.6T	**TC1**	14	+28.028	20	1
11	14	(Russia) Mikhail Kozlovskiy	Lukoil Lada Sport	Lada Granta 1.6T	**TC1**	14	+39.940	15	
12	9	(France) Sébastien Loeb	Citroën Total WTCC	Citroën C-Elysée WTCC	**TC1**	14	+41.238^{2}	6	
13	10	(Italy) Gianni Morbidelli	ALL-INKL.COM Münnich Motorsport	Chevrolet RML Cruze TC1	**TC1**	14	+1:06.588	13	
14	6	(Germany) Franz Engstler	Liqui Moly Team Engstler	BMW 320 TC	**TC2T**	14	+1:11.237	17	
15	27	(France) John Filippi	Campos Racing	SEAT León WTCC	**TC2T**	14	+1:35.752	18	
16	26	(Macau) Felipe De Souza	Liqui Moly Team Engstler	BMW 320 TC	**TC2T** **A**	13	+1 Lap	19	
Ret	77	(Germany) René Münnich	ALL-INKL.COM Münnich Motorsport	Chevrolet RML Cruze TC1	**TC1**	6	Brakes	16	
Ret	2	(Italy) **Gabriele Tarquini**	Castrol Honda World Touring Car Team	Honda Civic WTCC	**TC1**	5	Technical	4	
Ret	12	(United Kingdom) Robert Huff	Lukoil Lada Sport	Lada Granta 1.6T	**TC1**	4	Race incident	14	
Ret	1	(France) Yvan Muller	Citroën Total WTCC	Citroën C-Elysée WTCC	**TC1**	2	Race incident	8	
DNS	38	(Hong Kong) William Lok	Campos Racing	SEAT León WTCC	**TC2T** **A**	0	Did not start	21	

Bold denotes Fastest lap.

^1 — Chilton started from the pit lane.
^2 — Loeb received a 30–second penalty after the race for his collision with Muller.

== Standings after the event ==
Drivers' Championship standings

	Pos	Driver	Points
	1	(Argentina) José María López	384
	2	(France) Yvan Muller	291
	3	(France) Sébastien Loeb	251
	4	(Portugal) Tiago Monteiro	170
2	5	(Hungary) Norbert Michelisz	142

Yokohama Trophy standings

	Pos	Driver	Points
	1	(Germany) Franz Engstler	213
	2	(France) John Filippi	125
	3	(Italy) Pasquale Di Sabatino	98
4	4	(Macau) Felipe De Souza	18
1	5	(Argentina) Camilo Echevarría	12

Manufacturers' Championship standings

Pos	Manufacturer	Points
1	(France) Citroën	848
2	(Japan) Honda	574
3	(Russia) Lada	334

- Note: Only the top five positions are included for both sets of drivers' standings.
