= 2014 FIA WTCC Race of Slovakia =

Race details
- Round 4 of 12 in the 2014 World Touring Car Championship at Automotodróm Slovakia Ring in Orechová Potôň, Slovakia.
- Date: 11 May, 2014
- Location: Orechová Potôň, Slovakia
- Course: Automotodróm Slovakia Ring; 5.922 kilometres (3.680 mi)
- Laps: 9
Pole position
Driver		(Argentina) José María López	Citroën Total WTCC
Time		2:03.912	
Podium
First		(France) Sébastien Loeb	Citroën Total WTCC
Second		(Argentina) José María López	Citroën Total WTCC
Third		(Hungary) Norbert Michelisz	Zengő Motorsport
Fastest Lap
Driver		(France) Sébastien Loeb	Citroën Total WTCC
Time		2:18.193	

The 2014 FIA WTCC Race of Slovakia was the fourth round of the 2014 World Touring Car Championship season and the third running of the FIA WTCC Race of Slovakia. It was held on 11 May 2014 at the Automotodróm Slovakia Ring in Orechová Potôň, Slovakia.

Race one was won by Sébastien Loeb for Citroën Total WTCC. Race two was cancelled due to heavy rain, the first time a race had been cancelled in the history of the World Touring Car Championship.

== Background ==
Coming into the event José María López was leading the drivers' championship by ten points over teammate Yvan Muller. Franz Engstler led the Yokohama Trophy.

No changes were made to the compensation weight system after the Hungarian round. The Citroën C-Elysée WTCC remained the heaviest cars at 1,160 kilograms (2,557 lb) while the rest of the grid remained at the base weight of 1,100 kilograms (2,425 lb).

Petr Fulín returned the championship with Campos Racing, driving a TC2 SEAT León WTCC. NIKA Racing and their driver Yukinori Taniguchi withdrew their entry at the last minute.

== Report ==
=== Testing and free practice ===
López was quickest in Friday testing, nearly nine–tenths faster than the Honda of Tiago Monteiro. Hugo Valente was the highest placed Chevrolet driver while the quickest Lada driver was Robert Huff in 14th place.

In the first practice session on Saturday morning it was López who topped the times once again. The session was stopped a minute early after Huff stopped on track with electrical problems in his Lada Granta 1.6T.

López completed his domination of practice by setting the pace in the second free practice session. An off for Tom Coronel sent the ROAL Motorsport driver through the gravel while Huff continued to have technical problems but managed to set the 14th fastest time.

=== Qualifying ===
Norbert Michelisz was quickest in the first part of qualifying. Proteam Racing's Mehdi Bennani failed to set a time after technical problems prevented him from getting out onto the track for most of the session. Lukoil Lada Sport's Mikhail Kozlovskiy also failed to set a time. Sébastien Loeb almost failed to progress through to the second session when his car required attention in the pits having only set a banker lap on used tyres. He got out just before the end of the session and set a quick enough to time to progress despite his engine cutting–out just before the finish line.

López was back at the top of the timing sheets in second part of qualifying, a session which was disrupted by a red flag. The bonnet on Gabriele Tarquini's Honda flew open and he went off the track with Monteiro and Huff following him off the circuit. Michelisz was the only Honda driver to get through the Q3 along with the three Citroën drivers and Münnich Motorsport's Gianni Morbidelli. Monteiro ended the session tenth and took pole position on the reversed grid for race two.

López took pole position in Q3 and led a Citroën 1–2–3 with Loeb second and Muller third. Michelisz ended up fourth ahead of Morbidelli.

=== Race One ===
The race started on a wet track with rain falling at the start. Loeb moved into the lead at the start with Michelisz moving up to third behind López. Engstler went off on the first lap while Huff got himself up into the top ten after a good start. By the second lap Loeb and López were breaking away from the rest of the field with the third Citroën of Muller chasing Michelisz briefly before he went into the pits to serve a drive–through penalty for a jump start. Both Dušan Borković and Mehdi Bennani slipped in the wet conditions on lap three, Borković holding the slide while Bennani dipped off the circuit. Muller who was now climbing back up through the field after his penalty was the next to have a minor off in the wet conditions. Borković then had another off on lap four, going through the gravel and pulling part of the rear bumper on his Chevrolet RML Cruze TC1 off in the process. Nearer the front the battle for fourth place was between the ROAL Motorsport drivers, Tom Coronel eventually managed to pass Tom Chilton on lap five. By lap six the conditions on the track had got much wetter with cars becoming unstable on the main straight. The wetter conditions handed the advantage to the Lada cars with Huff engaging in a battle for eighth with Tarquini before the safety car came out. Three laps were completed behind the safety car to reach minimum race distance of 75 percent. The race was eventually red flagged on lap nine and Loeb declared the winner.

Prior to the Race of Austria, Lukoil Lada Sport's James Thompson was disqualified from the previous three races after the seal on his engine was found to have been broken without permission. This included both races in Hungary and the race in Slovakia.

=== Race Two ===
After race one was stopped early due to heavy rain, the decision was taken to cancel race two. The heavy rain meant the medical helicopter was unable to take off and the fading light were contributing factors to the decision.

== Results ==
=== Qualifying ===
Pos.	No.	Name	Team	Car	C	Q1	Q2	Q3	Points
1	37	(Argentina) José María López	Citroën Total WTCC	Citroën C-Elysée WTCC	TC1	2:05.504	2:04.038	2:03.912	**5**
2	9	(France) Sébastien Loeb	Citroën Total WTCC	Citroën C-Elysée WTCC	TC1	2:05.418	2:04.718	2:04.284	**4**
3	1	(France) Yvan Muller	Citroën Total WTCC	Citroën C-Elysée WTCC	TC1	2:05.114	2:04.747	2:04.541	**3**
4	5	(Hungary) Norbert Michelisz	Zengő Motorsport	Honda Civic WTCC	TC1	2:05.014	2:04.670	2:04.903	**2**
5	10	(Italy) Gianni Morbidelli	ALL-INKL.COM Münnich Motorsport	Chevrolet RML Cruze TC1	TC1	2:05.805	2:04.783	2:04.931	**1**
6	3	(United Kingdom) Tom Chilton	ROAL Motorsport	Chevrolet RML Cruze TC1	TC1	2:05.570	2:04.870		
7	4	(Netherlands) Tom Coronel	ROAL Motorsport	Chevrolet RML Cruze TC1	TC1	2:05.309	2:04.988		
8	2	(Italy) Gabriele Tarquini	Castrol Honda World Touring Car Team	Honda Civic WTCC	TC1	2:05.405	2:05.363		
9	7	(France) Hugo Valente	Campos Racing	Chevrolet RML Cruze TC1	TC1	2:05.031	2:05.429		
10	18	(Portugal) **Tiago Monteiro**	Castrol Honda World Touring Car Team	Honda Civic WTCC	TC1	2:05.685	2:05.772		
11	98	(Serbia) Dušan Borković	Campos Racing	Chevrolet RML Cruze TC1	TC1	2:06.298	2:06.835		
12	12	(United Kingdom) Robert Huff	Lukoil Lada Sport	Lada Granta 1.6T	TC1	2:06.493	2:07.002		
13	77	(Germany) René Münnich	ALL-INKL.COM Münnich Motorsport	Chevrolet RML Cruze TC1	TC1	2:06.625			
14	11	(United Kingdom) James Thompson	Lukoil Lada Sport	Lada Granta 1.6T	TC1	2:07.718			
15	6	(Germany) Franz Engstler	Liqui Moly Team Engstler	BMW 320 TC	TC2T	2:12.390			
16	8	(Italy) Pasquale Di Sabatino	Liqui Moly Team Engstler	BMW 320 TC	TC2T	2:13.381			
17	22	(Czech Republic) Petr Fulín	Campos Racing	SEAT León WTCC	TC2T	2:13.508			
18	27	(France) John Filippi	Campos Racing	SEAT León WTCC	TC2T	2:13.786			
107% time: 2:13.764
DNQ	14	(Russia) Mikhail Kozlovskiy	Lukoil Lada Sport	Lada Granta 1.6T	TC1	no time set			
DNQ	25	(Morocco) Mehdi Bennani	Proteam Racing	Honda Civic WTCC	TC1	no time set			

- **Bold** denotes Pole position for second race.

=== Race 1 ===
Pos.	No.	Name	Team	Car	C	Laps	Time/Retired	Grid	Points
1	9	(France) **Sébastien Loeb**	Citroën Total WTCC	Citroën C-Elysée WTCC	TC1	8	20:38.595	2	25
2	37	(Argentina) José María López	Citroën Total WTCC	Citroën C-Elysée WTCC	TC1	8	+1.105	1	18
3	5	(Hungary) Norbert Michelisz	Zengő Motorsport	Honda Civic WTCC	TC1	8	+2.435	4	15
4	4	(Netherlands) Tom Coronel	ROAL Motorsport	Chevrolet RML Cruze TC1	TC1	8	+4.081	7	12
5	3	(United Kingdom) Tom Chilton	ROAL Motorsport	Chevrolet RML Cruze TC1	TC1	8	+5.205	6	10
6	10	(Italy) Gianni Morbidelli	ALL-INKL.COM Münnich Motorsport	Chevrolet RML Cruze TC1	TC1	8	+6.026	5	8
7	18	(Portugal) Tiago Monteiro	Castrol Honda World Touring Car Team	Honda Civic WTCC	TC1	8	+6.960	10	6
8	2	(Italy) Gabriele Tarquini	Castrol Honda World Touring Car Team	Honda Civic WTCC	TC1	8	+7.410	8	4
9	12	(United Kingdom) Robert Huff	Lukoil Lada Sport	Lada Granta 1.6T	TC1	8	+8.359	12	2
10	1	(France) Yvan Muller	Citroën Total WTCC	Citroën C-Elysée WTCC	TC1	8	+9.457	3	1
11	7	(France) Hugo Valente	Campos Racing	Chevrolet RML Cruze TC1	TC1	8	+10.535	9	
12	98	(Serbia) Dušan Borković	Campos Racing	Chevrolet RML Cruze TC1	TC1	8	+10.971	11	
13	77	(Germany) René Münnich	ALL-INKL.COM Münnich Motorsport	Chevrolet RML Cruze TC1	TC1	8	+12.325	13	
14	25	(Morocco) Mehdi Bennani	Proteam Racing	Honda Civic WTCC	TC1	8	+14.690	19	
15	22	(Czech Republic) Petr Fulín	Campos Racing	SEAT León WTCC	TC2T	8	+39.574	17	
16	6	(Germany) Franz Engstler	Liqui Moly Team Engstler	BMW 320 TC	TC2T	8	+1:00.002	15	
17	8	(Italy) Pasquale Di Sabatino	Liqui Moly Team Engstler	BMW 320 TC	TC2T	8	+1:30.455	16	
18	27	(France) John Filippi	Campos Racing	SEAT León WTCC	TC2T	8	+1 Lap	18	
Ret	14	(Russia) Mikhail Kozlovskiy	Lukoil Lada Sport	Lada Granta 1.6T	TC1	0	Retired	20	
DSQ	11	(United Kingdom) James Thompson	Lukoil Lada Sport	Lada Granta 1.6T	TC1	8	Disqualified	14	

- **Bold** denotes Fastest lap.

== Standings after the event ==
Drivers' Championship standings

	Pos	Driver	Points
	1	(Argentina) José María López	138
1	3	(France) Sébastien Loeb	113
1	2	(France) Yvan Muller	109
	4	(Portugal) Tiago Monteiro	71
	5	(Italy) Gabriele Tarquini	52

Yokohama Trophy standings

	Pos	Driver	Points
	1	(Germany) Franz Engstler	75
	2	(Italy) Pasquale Di Sabatino	55
	3	(France) John Filippi	38
	4	(Czech Republic) Petr Fulín	10
1	5	(Japan) Yukinori Taniguchi	10

Manufacturers' Championship standings

Pos	Manufacturer	Points
1	(France) Citroën	323
2	(Japan) Honda	204
3	(Russia) Lada	107

- Note: Only the top five positions are included for both sets of drivers' standings.
