= 2014 FIA WTCC Race of Morocco =

Race details
- Round 1 of 12 in the 2014 World Touring Car Championship at Circuit International Automobile Moulay El Hassan in Marrakech, Morocco.
- Date: 13 April, 2014
- Location: Marrakech, Morocco
- Course: Circuit International Automobile Moulay El Hassan; 4.545 kilometres (2.824 mi)

Race One
- Laps: 14
Pole position
Driver		(Argentina) José María López	Citroën Total WTCC
Time		1:43.730	
Podium
First		(Argentina) José María López	Citroën Total WTCC
Second		(France) Sébastien Loeb	Citroën Total WTCC
Third		(France) Yvan Muller	Citroën Total WTCC
Fastest Lap
Driver		(France) Sébastien Loeb	Citroën Total WTCC
Time		1:43.777	

Race Two
- Laps: 16
Podium
First		(France) Sébastien Loeb	Citroën Total WTCC
Second		(Argentina) José María López	Citroën Total WTCC
Third		(France) Hugo Valente	Campos Racing
Fastest Lap
Driver		(Argentina) José María López	Citroën Total WTCC
Time		1:43.704	

The 2014 FIA WTCC Race of Morocco was the first round of the 2014 World Touring Car Championship season and the fifth running of the FIA WTCC Race of Morocco. It was held on 13 April 2014 at the Circuit International Automobile Moulay El Hassan in Marrakech, Morocco.

It was the first round for the new Super 2000 TC1 technical regulations.

Both races were won by Citroën Total WTCC during the team's first weekend in the World Touring Car Championship. Race one was won by José María López and race two was won by Sébastien Loeb.

== Background ==
New technical regulations were brought in for the start of the 2014 season, the existing Super 2000 cars were given bigger wings, tyres and more power in order to improve the racing. Older specification cars will still be allowed under TC2T regulations although they will be approximately 5 seconds per lap slower; drivers of these cars would be eligible for the Yokohama Trophy. Qualifying will be split into three parts, Q3 will see the top five drivers in Q2 set one lap time to determine the grid for race one. The race distances for all races will increase to 60 km (37.3 mi) in length.

The works Honda and Lada teams were joined by new entry Citroën. Chevrolet were represented by six privately run cars built by RML Group.

== Report ==
=== Testing and free practice ===
Yvan Muller set the pace in testing on the Friday before the race, José María López and Sébastien Loeb made it a Citroën 1–2–3. Hugo Valente was fourth and the quickest Chevrolet driver ahead of Tiago Monteiro in fifth and Robert Huff's Lada sixth.

Citroën were quickest once again in free practice one, this time courtesy of nine–time World Rally Championship champion Loeb. The session was ended a couple of minutes early after Tom Coronel crashed at one of the chicanes.

Muller was back on top in free practice two ahead of López and Loeb. The session was red flagged following a collision at the second chicane between the Honda of Gabriele Tarquini and the Chevrolet of Gianni Morbidelli. The damage sustained in the accident forced Tarquini to sit out the rest of the weekend while Morbidelli would be unable to take part in qualifying.

=== Qualifying ===
In first segment of qualifying, Muller, Loeb and López continued their practice form to fill the first three places while Chevrolet cars filled the next four places. The three remaining Hondas went through to Q2 while René Münnich made it through to Q2 for the very first time. The session was red flagged with forty seconds to go when the TC2T car of Petr Fulín crashed at turn 11.

Loeb topped the second part of qualifying ahead of López and Muller, Borković and Chilton were fourth and fifth and thus progressed through to the Q3 pole shootout. Coronel finished tenth to claim pole for race two where he would share the front row with Mehdi Bennani.

In Q3 it was López who set the fastest lap to claim pole, 0.018 seconds ahead of Muller. Loeb was fourth ahead of Chilton while Borković was black flagged for leaving the pit lane early.

After qualifying Muller had his fastest time in Q3 disallowed after cutting one of the chicanes, dropping him from second to fourth.

=== Race One ===
Fulín withdrew from the races on Sunday morning after he sustained heavy damage to his Campos Racing SEAT during qualifying.

Münnich jumped the start while Muller moved ahead of Chilton. Münnich was making a slow get away, he was tapped by a number of cars as they went around him at the start. Münnich then cut the first chicane and had a near-miss with team mate Morbidelli. At the end of the first lap Münnich was issued with a drive-through penalty for jumping the start and he went into the pits for the first time during the race. Hugo Valente and Bennani were involved in a minor scrap at the final chicane, the two made contact and Bennani lost his rear bumper which briefly brought out yellow flags in the final sector while it was cleared. On lap five Borković tried to go up the side of Monteiro at the final corner, Monteiro moved across and the two made contact with the Honda driver sustaining minor damage. On lap 13 Norbert Michelisz slowed with a problem on his Honda, allowing Bennani to move up to 7th position. The three Citroën cars held position for the remainder of the race, López leading Loeb and Muller to the finish line. Chilton finished fourth over six seconds behind Muller while Franz Engstler was the winner in the TC2T class.

After the race Borković was given a 10–second penalty after his team removed the SD card from the onboard camera. The penalty dropped him form fifth to sixth place in the final classification.

=== Race Two ===
The start of race two was delayed when it was found a number of cars were in the wrong positions on the grid. Huff was unable to start the race due to turbo problems while his team mate James Thompson was taken ill. Coronel got away well at the start while Bennani tried to go up the inside of the ROAL Motorsport Chevrolet. Coronel was turned across the front of Bennani's car and bounced back across the track when he hit the wall, Muller was also caught up in the incident and stopped on the circuit. The safety car was brought out before the race was stopped on lap two. After a lengthy delay, the race was restarted behind the safety car with Bennani leading Monteiro. Loeb immediately challenged Monteiro for second and took the place at the first corner. Bennani was issued with a drive through penalty for causing a collision on the second lap as he was demoted by Loeb to second place. Valente and Monteiro had a coming together at one of the chicanes while disputing third place, soon after López got involved in the fight and he took fourth from Valente and then third from Monteiro. On lap 8 Borković stopped on the circuit in the third sector and the safety car was brought out once again. Valente was then able to pass Monteiro to move into third. The race was restarted on lap 10, Bennani was moving back through the field following his penalty and moved up to 7th at the expense of Morbidelli. One lap later at the same place Bennani moved ahead of Mikhail Kozlovskiy for sixth place. On lap 14 Monteiro suffered a problem on his right-front wheel causing him to drop down the order and moving Bennani up to fourth. Loeb claimed his first WTCC victory ahead of team mate López, Valente claimed his first WTCC podium by finishing third. Chilton and Bennani had been battling for fourth in the final laps and a drag race to the finish line saw Chilton finish ahead by 0.03 seconds. Engstler was the TC2T class winner by finishing eighth.

Following his drive–through penalty during the race, Bennani was given a three–place grid penalty for the next race in France. Bennani was later excluded from the race for having an underweight car, moving Monteiro up into the final points position.

== Results ==
=== Qualifying ===
Pos.	No.	Name	Team	Car	C	Q1	Q2	Q3	Points
1	37	(Argentina) José María López	Citroën Total WTCC	Citroën C-Elysée WTCC	TC1	1:44.522	1:43.710	1:43.730	**5**
2	9	(France) Sébastien Loeb	Citroën Total WTCC	Citroën C-Elysée WTCC	TC1	1:44.219	1:43.706	1:43.845	**4**
3	3	(United Kingdom) Tom Chilton	ROAL Motorsport	Chevrolet RML Cruze TC1	TC1	1:45.257	1:45.057	1:44.864	**3**
4	1	(France) Yvan Muller	Citroën Total WTCC	Citroën C-Elysée WTCC	TC1	1:43.824	1:43.711	Excluded	**2**
5	98	(Serbia) Dušan Borković	Campos Racing	Chevrolet RML Cruze TC1	TC1	1:46.062	1:45.017	Excluded	**1**
6	77	(Germany) René Münnich	ALL-INKL.COM Münnich Motorsport	Chevrolet RML Cruze TC1	TC1	1:47.099	1:45.541		
7	18	(Portugal) Tiago Monteiro	Castrol Honda World Touring Car Team	Honda Civic WTCC	TC1	1:46.429	1:45.891		
8	5	(Hungary) Norbert Michelisz	Zengő Motorsport	Honda Civic WTCC	TC1	1:46.292	1:46.165		
9	25	(Morocco) Mehdi Bennani	Proteam Racing	Honda Civic WTCC	TC1	1:46.211	1:46.227		
10	4	(Netherlands) **Tom Coronel**	ROAL Motorsport	Chevrolet RML Cruze TC1	TC1	1:45.956	1:46.331		
11	11	(United Kingdom) James Thompson	Lukoil Lada Sport	Lada Granta 1.6T	TC1	1:46.662	1:46.433		
12	7	(France) Hugo Valente	Campos Racing	Chevrolet RML Cruze TC1	TC1	1:45.848	1:55.284		
13	12	(United Kingdom) Robert Huff	Lukoil Lada Sport	Lada Granta 1.6T	TC1	1:47.512			
14	14	(Russia) Mikhail Kozlovskiy	Lukoil Lada Sport	Lada Granta 1.6T	TC1	1:47.762			
15	6	(Germany) Franz Engstler	Liqui Moly Team Engstler	BMW 320 TC	TC2T	1:49.250			
16	22	(Czech Republic) Petr Fulín	Campos Racing	SEAT León WTCC	TC2T	1:50.489			
17	8	(Italy) Pasquale Di Sabatino	Liqui Moly Team Engstler	BMW 320 TC	TC2T	1:50.520			
107% time: 1:51.091
–	27	(France) John Filippi	Campos Racing	SEAT León WTCC	TC2T	no time set			
–	10	(Italy) Gianni Morbidelli	ALL-INKL.COM Münnich Motorsport	Chevrolet RML Cruze TC1	TC1	no time set			
–	2	(Italy) Gabriele Tarquini	Castrol Honda World Touring Car Team	Honda Civic WTCC	TC1	no time set			

- **Bold** denotes Pole position for second race.

=== Race 1 ===
Pos.	No.	Name	Team	Car	C	Laps	Time/Retired	Grid	Points
1	37	(Argentina) José María López	Citroën Total WTCC	Citroën C-Elysée WTCC	TC1	14	24:40.950	1	25
2	9	**(France) Sébastien Loeb**	Citroën Total WTCC	Citroën C-Elysée WTCC	TC1	14	+0.713	2	18
3	1	(France) Yvan Muller	Citroën Total WTCC	Citroën C-Elysée WTCC	TC1	14	+1.607	4	15
4	3	(United Kingdom) Tom Chilton	ROAL Motorsport	Chevrolet RML Cruze TC1	TC1	14	+8.222	3	12
5	18	(Portugal) Tiago Monteiro	Castrol Honda World Touring Car Team	Honda Civic WTCC	TC1	14	+20.495	7	10
6	98	(Serbia) Dušan Borković	Campos Racing	Chevrolet RML Cruze TC1	TC1	14	+21.849	5	8
7	25	(Morocco) Mehdi Bennani	Proteam Racing	Honda Civic WTCC	TC1	14	+25.111	9	6
8	7	(France) Hugo Valente	Campos Racing	Chevrolet RML Cruze TC1	TC1	14	+29.953	12	4
9	5	(Hungary) Norbert Michelisz	Zengő Motorsport	Honda Civic WTCC	TC1	14	+44.583	8	2
10	11	(United Kingdom) James Thompson	Lukoil Lada Sport	Lada Granta 1.6T	TC1	14	+48.596	11	1
11	14	(Russia) Mikhail Kozlovskiy	Lukoil Lada Sport	Lada Granta 1.6T	TC1	14	+1:03.873	14	
12	6	(Germany) Franz Engstler	Liqui Moly Team Engstler	BMW 320 TC	TC2T	14	+1:14.163	15	
13	8	(Italy) Pasquale Di Sabatino	Liqui Moly Team Engstler	BMW 320 TC	TC2T	14	+1:37.538	16	
14	27	(France) John Filippi	Campos Racing	SEAT León WTCC	TC2T	14	+1:41.171	17	
15	10	(Italy) Gianni Morbidelli	ALL-INKL.COM Münnich Motorsport	Chevrolet RML Cruze TC1	TC1	12	+2 Laps	18	
Ret	77	(Germany) René Münnich	ALL-INKL.COM Münnich Motorsport	Chevrolet RML Cruze TC1	TC1	9	Steering	6	
Ret	4	(Netherlands) Tom Coronel	ROAL Motorsport	Chevrolet RML Cruze TC1	TC1	7	Gearbox	10	
Ret	12	(United Kingdom) Robert Huff	Lukoil Lada Sport	Lada Granta 1.6T	TC1	4	Turbo	13	

- **Bold** denotes Fastest lap.

=== Race 2 ===
Pos.	No.	Name	Team	Car	C	Laps	Time/Retired	Grid	Points
1	9	(France) Sébastien Loeb	Citroën Total WTCC	Citroën C-Elysée WTCC	TC1	16	47:50.589	9	25
2	37	**(Argentina) José María López**	Citroën Total WTCC	Citroën C-Elysée WTCC	TC1	16	+4.321	10	18
3	7	(France) Hugo Valente	Campos Racing	Chevrolet RML Cruze TC1	TC1	16	+7.598	12	15
4	3	(United Kingdom) Tom Chilton	ROAL Motorsport	Chevrolet RML Cruze TC1	TC1	16	+18.305	8	12
5	14	(Russia) Mikhail Kozlovskiy	Lukoil Lada Sport	Lada Granta 1.6T	TC1	16	+19.757	14	10
6	10	(Italy) Gianni Morbidelli	ALL-INKL.COM Münnich Motorsport	Chevrolet RML Cruze TC1	TC1	16	+23.117	18	8
7	6	(Germany) Franz Engstler	Liqui Moly Team Engstler	BMW 320 TC	TC2T	16	+38.957	15	6
8	27	(France) John Filippi	Campos Racing	SEAT León WTCC	TC2T	16	+48.611	17	4
9	8	(Italy) Pasquale Di Sabatino	Liqui Moly Team Engstler	BMW 320 TC	TC2T	16	+50.553	16	2
10	18	(Portugal) Tiago Monteiro	Castrol Honda World Touring Car Team	Honda Civic WTCC	TC1	14	+2 Laps	4	1
Ret	98	(Serbia) Dušan Borković	Campos Racing	Chevrolet RML Cruze TC1	TC1	7	Fire	6	
Ret	77	(Germany) René Münnich	ALL-INKL.COM Münnich Motorsport	Chevrolet RML Cruze TC1	TC1	4	Race incident	5	
Ret	12	(United Kingdom) Robert Huff	Lukoil Lada Sport	Lada Granta 1.6T	TC1	2	Turbo	13	
Ret	4	(Netherlands) Tom Coronel	ROAL Motorsport	Chevrolet RML Cruze TC1	TC1	0	Race incident	1	
Ret	1	(France) Yvan Muller	Citroën Total WTCC	Citroën C-Elysée WTCC	TC1	0	Race incident	7	
DNS	5	(Hungary) Norbert Michelisz	Zengő Motorsport	Honda Civic WTCC	TC1	0	Did not start	3	
DNS	11	(United Kingdom) James Thompson	Lukoil Lada Sport	Lada Granta 1.6T	TC1	0	Did not start	11	
DSQ	25	(Morocco) Mehdi Bennani	Proteam Racing	Honda Civic WTCC	TC1	16	Disqualified	2	

- **Bold** denotes Fastest lap.

== Standings after the event ==
Drivers' Championship standings

Pos	Driver	Points
1	(Argentina) José María López	48
2	(France) Sébastien Loeb	47
3	(United Kingdom) Tom Chilton	27
4	(France) Hugo Valente	19
5	(France) Yvan Muller	17

Yokohama Trophy standings

Pos	Driver	Points
1	(Germany) Franz Engstler	23
2	(Italy) Pasquale Di Sabatino	14
2	(France) John Filippi	14

Manufacturers' Championship standings

Pos	Manufacturer	Points
1	(France) Citroën	95
2	(Japan) Honda	44
3	(Russia) Lada	34

- Note: Only the top five positions are included for both sets of drivers' standings.
