= Tin Sritrai =

Thai racing driver (born 1989)

- Nationality: Thai
- Born: 22 August 1989 (age 37) Khon Kaen, Thailand

TCR Asia Series career
- Debut season: 2015
- Current team: Asia Racing Team
- Car number: 31
- Starts: 2
- Wins: 1

Previous series
- 2013–14 2012–15 2011 2010 2003–08: Thailand Super Series; Asian Touring Car Series; Formula Pilota China; Asian Formula Renault Series; Karting

Championship titles
- 2013–14 2012–14 2004–05, 08: Thailand Super Series; Asian Touring Car Series; Karting

Tin Sritrai (born 22 August 1989) is a Thai racing driver currently competing in the TCR Asia Series. He has previously competed in the Asian Formula Renault Series, Formula Pilota China and Asian Touring Car Series amongst others.

== Racing career ==
Sritrai began his career in 2003 in karting, he won three titles before ending his karting career in 2008. In 2010, he switched to the Asian Formula Renault Series, where he finished second in the championship standings that year. He raced in the Formula Pilota China championship in 2011, finishing 5th in the championship standings. In 2012, he switched to the Asian Touring Car Series, he has won the championship four times from 2012–14 and currently leads the 2015 standings. He raced in the Thailand Super Series from 2013–14 and won the championship both years.

In October 2015, it was announced that Sritrai would race in the TCR Asia Series & TCR International Series, driving a SEAT León Cup Racer for Asia Racing Team. It was also announced that he would become the first Thai racing driver to race in the World Touring Car Championship, driving a Chevrolet RML Cruze TC1 for Campos Racing.

== Racing record ==
=== Complete TCR International Series results ===
(key) (Races in bold indicate pole position) (Races in italics indicate fastest lap)

Year	Team	Car	1	2	3	4	5	6	7	8	9	10	11	12	13	14	15	16	17	18	19	20	21	22	DC	Points
2015	Asia Racing Team	SEAT León Cup Racer	MYS; 1	MYS; 2	CHN; 1	CHN; 2	ESP; 1	ESP; 2	POR; 1	POR; 2	ITA; 1	ITA; 2	AUT; 1	AUT; 2	RUS; 1	RUS; 2	RBR; 1	RBR; 2	SIN; 1	SIN; 2	THA; 1; 12	THA; 2; 8	MAC; 1	MAC; 2	32nd	4
2016	Team Thailand	Honda Civic TCR	BHR; 1	BHR; 2	POR; 1	POR; 2	BEL; 1	BEL; 2	ITA; 1	ITA; 2	AUT; 1	AUT; 2	GER; 1	GER; 2	RUS; 1	RUS; 2	THA; 1	THA; 2	SIN; 1	SIN; 2	MYS; 1 Ret	**MYS**; **2**; 13	MAC; 1; 7	MAC; 2; 12	27th	4

=== Complete World Touring Car Championship results ===
(key) (Races in bold indicate pole position) (Races in italics indicate fastest lap)

Year	Team	Car	1	2	3	4	5	6	7	8	9	10	11	12	13	14	15	16	17	18	19	20	21	22	23	24	DC	Points
2015	Campos Racing	Chevrolet RML Cruze TC1	ARG; 1	ARG; 2	MAR; 1	MAR; 2	HUN; 1	HUN; 2	GER; 1	GER; 2	RUS; 1	RUS; 2	SVK; 1	SVK; 2	FRA; 1	FRA; 2	POR; 1	POR; 2	JPN; 1	JPN; 2	CHN; 1	CHN; 2	THA; 1; 10	THA; 2; 9	QAT; 1	QAT; 2	22nd	3
