= FIA WTCC Race of Thailand =

- Chang International Circuit (2015)

Race information
- Number of times held: 1
- First held: 2015
- Last held: 2015
- Most wins (drivers): (Argentina) José María López (1) (France) Sébastien Loeb (1)
- Most wins (constructors): (France) Citroën (2)

Last race (2015)
- Race 1 Winner: (Argentina) José María López; (Citroën Total WTCC)
- Race 2 Winner: (France) Sébastien Loeb; (Citroën Total WTCC)

The FIA WTCC Race of Thailand was a round of the World Touring Car Championship held at the Chang International Circuit located in Buriram, Isan, Thailand.

The race made its debut in the World Touring Car Championship as the 11th round of the 2015 World Touring Car Championship season. The race was cancelled in 2016.

== Winners ==
Year	Race	Driver	Manufacturer	Location	Report
2015	Race 1	(Argentina) José María López	(France) Citroën	Chang International Circuit	Report
2015	Race 2	(France) Sébastien Loeb	(France) Citroën	Chang International Circuit	Report
