= 2015 FIA WTCC Race of Hungary =

Race details
- Round 3 of 12 in the 2015 World Touring Car Championship at Hungaroring in Mogyoród, Hungary.
- Date: 3 May, 2015
- Location: Mogyoród, Hungary
- Course: Hungaroring; 4.381 kilometres (2.722 mi)

Race One
- Laps: 13
Pole position
| Driver | | (France) Yvan Muller | Citroën Total WTCC |
| Time | | 1:48.848 | |
Podium
| First | | (Argentina) José María López | Citroën Total WTCC |
| Second | | (France) Yvan Muller | Citroën Total WTCC |
| Third | | (France) Hugo Valente | Campos Racing |
Fastest Lap
| Driver | | (Argentina) José María López | Citroën Total WTCC |
| Time | | 1:50.783 | |

Race Two
- Laps: 14
Podium
| First | | (Hungary) Norbert Michelisz | Zengő Motorsport |
| Second | | (Netherlands) Tom Coronel | ROAL Motorsport |
| Third | | (United Kingdom) Tom Chilton | ROAL Motorsport |
Fastest Lap
| Driver | | (Italy) Gabriele Tarquini | Honda Racing Team |
| Time | | 1:50.356 | |

The 2015 FIA WTCC Race of Hungary (formally the 2015 MOL Group Race of Hungary) was the third round of the 2015 World Touring Car Championship season and the fifth running of the FIA WTCC Race of Hungary. It was held on 3 May 2015 at the Hungaroring in Mogyoród near Budapest, Hungary.

Race one was won by José María López for Citroën Total WTCC and race two was won by Norbert Michelisz for Zengő Motorsport.

== Background ==
After the second round López led the drivers' championship by 17 points over teammate Sébastien Loeb. Mehdi Bennani led the Yokohama Trophy standings by one point over Norbert Michelisz.

Proteam Racing were absent from the grid following the departure of Dušan Borković from the team after the previous round in Morocco. With Rickard Rydell still recovering from thyroiditis, Nika International did not enter their car for the Hungarian round after deciding not to enter a substitute driver.

Hungary saw the first compensation weight revisions of year; the Citroën C-Elysée WTCC gained the maximum ballast of 60 kilograms (132 lb) to increase their weight to 1,160 kilograms (2,557 lb). The Honda Civic WTCCs, Chevrolet RML Cruze TC1s and Lada Vesta WTCCs remained at the base weight of 1,100 kilograms (2,425 lb).

== Report ==
=== Testing and free practice ===
Free practice one took place in wet conditions, the fastest time was set by López with Gabriele Tarquini and Tiago Monteiro second and third in their updated Honda Civic WTCCs. Loeb slid off the track at the first corner early on, crashing into the tyre barriers and ending his session early. After the session, Hugo Valente and John Filippi were viewed to have ignored yellow flags during the session and were given a five–place grid penalties for race one.

López was quickest once again in free practice two which was also held in wet conditions. Tarquini and Monteiro were second and third once again while Yvan Muller was fourth.

=== Qualifying ===
The first part of qualifying was red–flagged when Tarquini slid on the wet kerb at turn three before setting a time and went into the barriers. When the session resumed, Muller led Robert Huff and López. James Thompson finished the session in fourteenth; it was announced after qualifying that he was withdrawing from the rest of the weekend on medical grounds due to a tooth abscess.

López led an all–Citroën top three in the second part of qualifying, a number of improvements in the final minutes of the session meant Muller, Loeb, Hugo Valente and Ma Qing Hua all secured places in Q3. Monteiro was the first of the outsiders in sixth with Huff, Coronel and Chilton lining up behind. Michelisz claimed pole position for race two by finishing tenth, Bennani and Stefano D'Aste missed out on the race two grid reversal.

Ma missed out on his Q3 lap when he failed to get out of the pits in time before the red light came on and he was to remain in fifth place. Valente was the next driver to go out and set his lap followed by Loeb who ran wide at the final corner of his out lap and put himself provisionally second behind Valente. Muller was next out and his lap put him on pole with López only going third on his lap after a mistake at turn three.

After qualifying, Campos Racing successfully appealed the penalties for their drivers for race one meaning Valente would start race one on the front row.

=== Race One ===
The first start was aborted due to Muller, Valente, López and Ma lining up in the wrong grid slots and an extra formation lap took place. The race started on the second attempt and López moved up past Valente and up the inside of Muller to take the lead into the first corner. Chilton went up the inside of Michelisz at the first corner on lap two but Michelisz had the inside of turn two to defend the move; Chilton then successfully moved up to seventh at turn five with a slight nudge. By lap ten López and Muller had distanced themselves from third placed Valente who was running ahead of Ma and Monteiro; Monteiro was putting the pressure on Ma for fourth place. López led home Muller by over 3.9 seconds with Valente finishing both third overall and as the Yokohama Trophy winner.

Tarquini was later excluded from the race for a breach of parc fermé regulations; the Honda Racing Team JAS checked the tyre pressures before the start of repair time.

=== Race Two ===
Tom Coronel jumped ahead of teammate Tom Chilton at the start and into second place while Michelisz led away from pole, at the back of the field Tarquini took to the grass to avoid Filippi. At the first corner there was a coming together with the factory Citroën drivers which ended up with Ma and the Lada of Huff making contact and Huff spinning off. Despite broken left rear suspension Huff limped back to the pit lane where he retired. Loeb was pressuring Monteiro for fourth but was struggling to make a pass and had López in sixth place closing in on him. Defending from Loeb meant Monteiro was losing ground on both Coronel and Chilton who were themselves dropping away from race leader Michelisz. By lap eight Loeb's defence from López allowed Monteiro to open up a gap and pursue Chilton for the final podium spot, further down the order Filippi took D'Aste for eleventh. Michelisz took the top spot of what was an all-independent podium with ROAL Motorsport's Coronel and Chilton coming home second and third.

== Standings after the event ==
Drivers' Championship standings

| | Pos | Driver | Points |
|---|---|---|---|
| | 1 | (Argentina) José María López | 129 |
| | 2 | (France) Sébastien Loeb | 96 |
| | 3 | (France) Yvan Muller | 86 |
| 2 | 4 | (Portugal) Tiago Monteiro | 58 |
| 1 | 5 | (China) Ma Qing Hua | 53 |

Yokohama Trophy standings

| | Pos | Driver | Points |
|---|---|---|---|
| 1 | 1 | (Hungary) Norbert Michelisz | 47 |
| 1 | 2 | (United Kingdom) Tom Chilton | 43 |
| 2 | 3 | (Morocco) Mehdi Bennani | 35 |
| 3 | 4 | (France) Hugo Valente | 25 |
| 1 | 5 | (Italy) Stefano D'Aste | 23 |

Manufacturers' Championship standings

| Pos | Manufacturer | Points |
|---|---|---|
| 1 | (France) Citroën | 269 |
| 2 | (Japan) Honda | 190 |
| 3 | (Russia) Lada | 44 |

- Note: Only the top five positions are included for both sets of drivers' standings.
