= 2015 World Touring Car Championship =

Motorsport contest

Champions
- World Drivers' Champion: José María López
- World Manufacturers' Champion: Citroën

Seasons
- ← 2014 2016 →

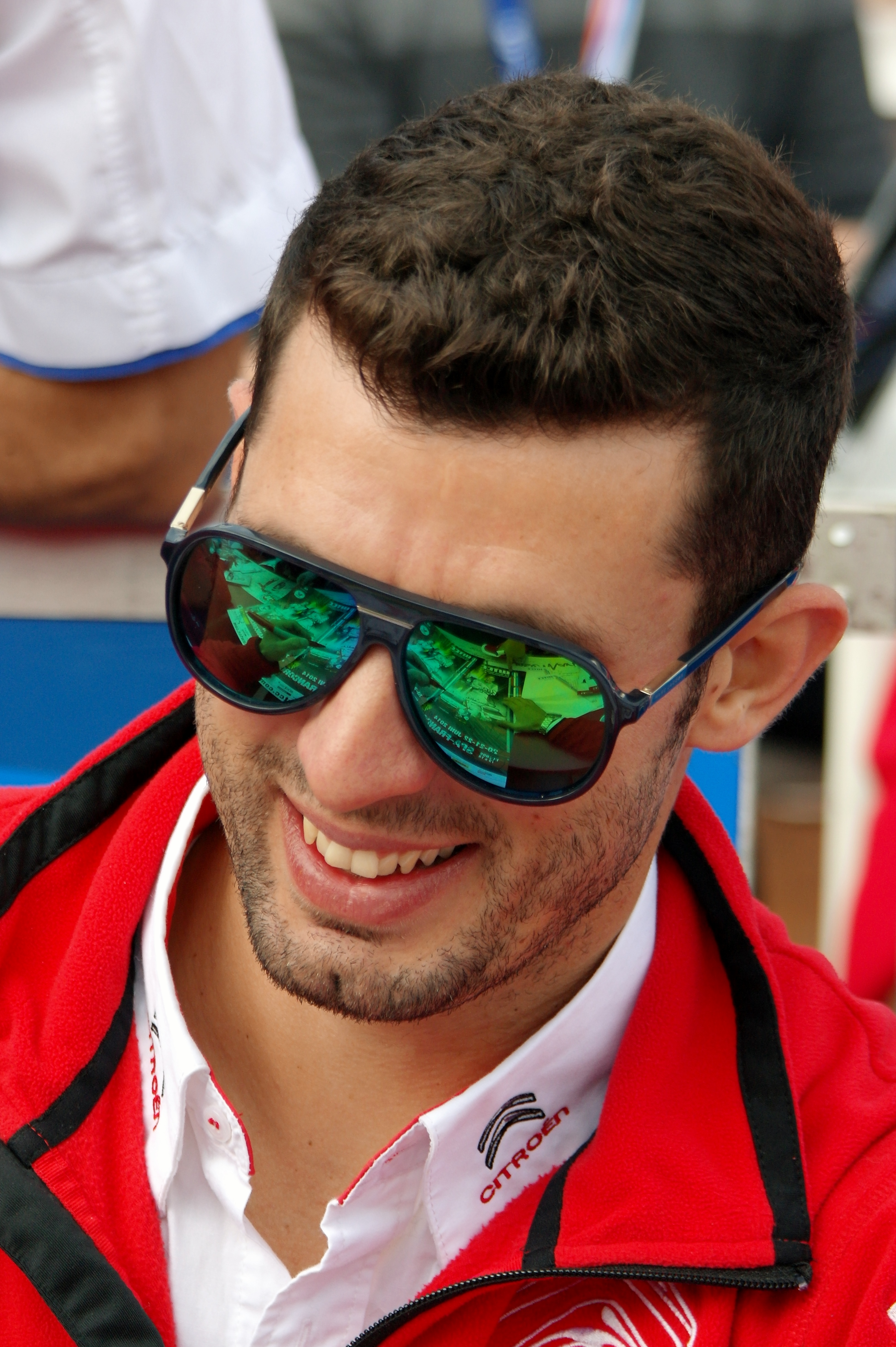
José María López (pictured in 2014) won his second consecutive Drivers' Championship

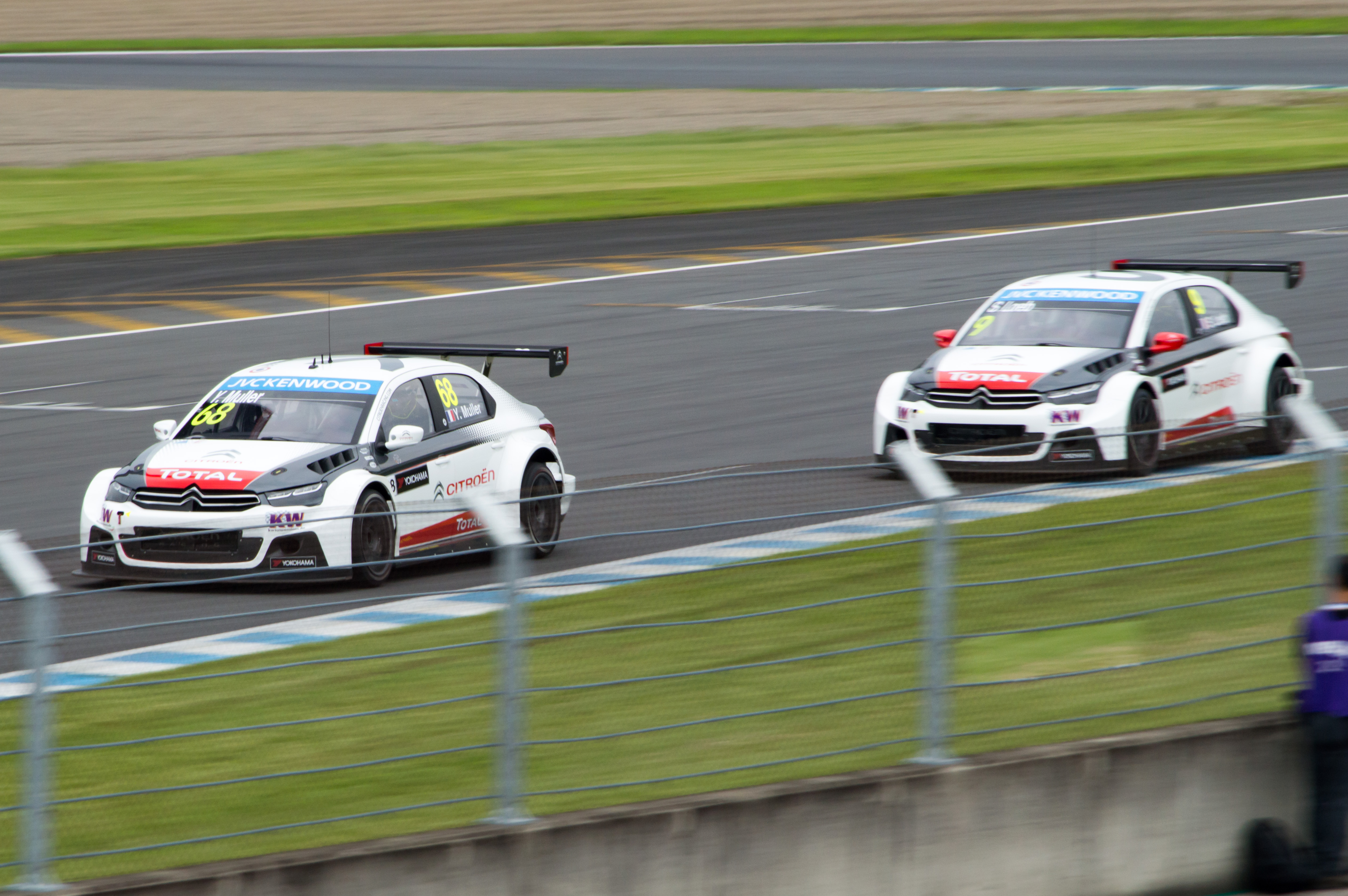
Citroën won the Manufacturers Championship with its C-Elysée WTCC entries

The 2015 World Touring Car Championship was a motor racing competition organised by the FIA for Super 2000 cars. It was the twelfth FIA World Touring Car Championship, and the eleventh since the series was revived in 2005. The championship comprised a Drivers Championship and a Manufacturers Championship, which were won by José María López and Citroën respectively.

== Teams and drivers ==
Team	Car	No.	Drivers	Rounds
Manufacturer entries
(Japan) Honda Racing Team JAS	Honda Civic WTCC	2	(Italy) Gabriele Tarquini	All
(Japan) Honda Racing Team JAS	Honda Civic WTCC	18	(Portugal) Tiago Monteiro	All
(France) Citroën Total WTCC	Citroën C-Elysée WTCC	9	(France) Sébastien Loeb	All
(France) Citroën Total WTCC	Citroën C-Elysée WTCC	33	(China) Ma Qing Hua	All
(France) Citroën Total WTCC	Citroën C-Elysée WTCC	37	(Argentina) José María López	All
(France) Citroën Total WTCC	Citroën C-Elysée WTCC	68	(France) Yvan Muller	All
(Russia) Lada Sport Rosneft	Lada Vesta WTCC	10	(Netherlands) Nick Catsburg	5–12
(Russia) Lada Sport Rosneft	Lada Vesta WTCC	12	(United Kingdom) Robert Huff	All
(Russia) Lada Sport Rosneft	Lada Vesta WTCC	14	(Russia) Mikhail Kozlovskiy	2–3
(Russia) Lada Sport Rosneft	Lada Vesta WTCC	15	(United Kingdom) James Thompson	1–3
(Russia) Lada Sport Rosneft	Lada Vesta WTCC	46	(Netherlands) Jaap van Lagen	4–8
(Russia) Lada Sport Rosneft	Lada Vesta WTCC	47	(France) Nicolas Lapierre	9–12
Independent entries
(Italy) ROAL Motorsport	Chevrolet RML Cruze TC1	3	(United Kingdom) Tom Chilton	All
(Italy) ROAL Motorsport	Chevrolet RML Cruze TC1	4	(Netherlands) Tom Coronel	All
(Hungary) Zengő Motorsport	Honda Civic WTCC	5	(Hungary) Norbert Michelisz	All
(Spain) Campos Racing	Chevrolet RML Cruze TC1	7	(France) Hugo Valente	All
(Spain) Campos Racing	Chevrolet RML Cruze TC1	27	(France) John Filippi	All
(Spain) Campos Racing	Chevrolet RML Cruze TC1	70	(Slovakia) Maťo Homola	6
(Spain) Campos Racing	Chevrolet RML Cruze TC1	95	(Qatar) Nasser Al-Attiyah	12
(Spain) Campos Racing	Chevrolet RML Cruze TC1	99	(Thailand) Tin Sritrai	11
(Germany) ALL–INKL.COM Münnich Motorsport	Chevrolet RML Cruze TC1	8	(Germany) Sabine Schmitz	4
(Germany) ALL–INKL.COM Münnich Motorsport	Chevrolet RML Cruze TC1	26	(Italy) Stefano D'Aste	All
(Hong Kong) Craft Bamboo	Chevrolet RML Cruze TC1	11	(France) Grégoire Demoustier	All
(Sweden) Nika International	Honda Civic WTCC	19	(Sweden) Rickard Rydell	1, 5, 7
(Sweden) Nika International	Honda Civic WTCC	29	(Argentina) Néstor Girolami	6, 8
(France) Sébastien Loeb Racing	Citroën C-Elysée WTCC	25	(Morocco) Mehdi Bennani	All
(Italy) Proteam Racing	Honda Civic WTCC	98	(Serbia) Dušan Borković	1–2

=== Team changes ===
- Citroën will expand its campaign to five full-time entries from 3 full-time entries and 1 part-time entry. Four of the cars will be entered by the main factory team, while the other one will be entered by the satellite team Sébastien Loeb Racing.
- NIKA Racing will return to the series with a TC1-specification Honda Civic WTCC.
- Lada Sport will switch from the Lada Granta 1.6T to a TC1-specification Lada Vesta for the 2015 season. Also the Russian state owned oil company Rosneft will become the team's primary sponsor after the team split with Lukoil during the 2014 season.
- Liqui Moly Team Engstler, who entered 2 TC2-specification BMW 320 TC for the 2014 season, will leave the series after 8 years of participation. The team later elected to participate in the TCR International Series.
- Bamboo Engineering will return to the series as Craft Bamboo Racing with a Chevrolet RML Cruze TC1.

=== Mid season changes ===
- Dušan Borković left Proteam Racing after dispute with the team.

== Calendar ==
The 2015 schedule was announced at a meeting of the FIA World Motor Sport Council in Doha, Qatar on 3 December 2014. The season is once again being contested over twenty-four races at twelve circuits, but will see several changes of venue. The races at Salzburgring, Spa-Francorchamps, Beijing and Macau have been removed from the schedule. The Races of Germany and Portugal returned to the calendar. The race in Germany will be held at the Nürburgring Nordschleife circuit while the Portuguese round will be held at the Circuito Internacional de Vila Real, a street circuit 100 kilometres (62 miles) east of Porto. Two new races were added – in Thailand at Burinam and Qatar at the Losail. On 23 January 2015, Twin Ring Motegi was announced as host of the Race of Japan. On 30 June 2015, it was announced that the season finale at the Losail International Circuit would be moved to Friday 27 November, to prevent the event from clashing with a local political event and the season finales of the 2015 Formula One season. It will be the first time WTCC will race on a Friday.

Rnd.	Race	Race Name	Circuit	Date
1	1	Race of Argentina	(Argentina) Autódromo Termas de Río Hondo	8 March
1	2	Race of Argentina	(Argentina) Autódromo Termas de Río Hondo	8 March
2	3	Eurodatacar Race of Morocco	(Morocco) Circuit International Automobile Moulay El Hassan	19 April
2	4	Eurodatacar Race of Morocco	(Morocco) Circuit International Automobile Moulay El Hassan	19 April
3	5	MOL Group Race of Hungary	(Hungary) Hungaroring	3 May
3	6	MOL Group Race of Hungary	(Hungary) Hungaroring	3 May
4	7	Race of Germany	(Germany) Nürburgring Nordschleife	16 May
4	8	Race of Germany	(Germany) Nürburgring Nordschleife	16 May
5	9	Rosneft Race of Russia	(Russia) Moscow Raceway	7 June
5	10	Rosneft Race of Russia	(Russia) Moscow Raceway	7 June
6	11	Race of Slovakia	Automotodróm Slovakia Ring	21 June
6	12	Race of Slovakia	Automotodróm Slovakia Ring	21 June
7	13	JVC Kenwood Race of France	(France) Circuit Paul Ricard	28 June
7	14	JVC Kenwood Race of France	(France) Circuit Paul Ricard	28 June
8	15	Oscaro Race of Portugal	(Portugal) Circuito Internacional de Vila Real	12 July
8	16	Oscaro Race of Portugal	(Portugal) Circuito Internacional de Vila Real	12 July
9	17	JVC Kenwood Race of Japan	(Japan) Twin Ring Motegi	13 September
9	18	JVC Kenwood Race of Japan	(Japan) Twin Ring Motegi	13 September
10	19	Rosneft Race of China	(China) Shanghai International Circuit	27 September
10	20	Rosneft Race of China	(China) Shanghai International Circuit	27 September
11	21	Race of Thailand	(Thailand) Chang International Circuit	1 November
11	22	Race of Thailand	(Thailand) Chang International Circuit	1 November
12	23	DHL Race of Qatar	(Qatar) Losail International Circuit	27 November
12	24	DHL Race of Qatar	(Qatar) Losail International Circuit	27 November

== Points system ==
Drivers Championship points were awarded on a 25-18-15-12-10-8-6-4-2-1 basis for the first ten places in each race. Points were also awarded on a 5-4-3-2-1 basis for the first five places after the qualifying session.

Manufacturers Championship points were awarded on the same basis as for the Drivers Championship. Only the results obtained by the best two cars classified per manufacturer were taken into account. All other cars of that same manufacturer were considered invisible as far as scoring points was concerned.

== Results and standings ==
=== Races ===
==== Compensation weights ====
The most competitive cars keep a 60 kg compensation weight. The other cars get a lower one, calculated according to their results for the three previous rounds. The less the cars get some good results, the less they get a compensation weight, from 0 kg to 60 kg. For the first two rounds, all the cars had a 60 kg compensation weight.

Compensation weight comes into effect for the third round, in Hungary, with Citroën penalized by a maximum of 60 kg compensation weight, as the best results cars.

Car	Hungaroring	Nürburgring	Moscow	Slovakia Ring	Le Castellet	Vila Real	Motegi	Shanghai	Buriram	Losail
Citroën C-Elysée WTCC	+60 kg	+60 kg	+60 kg	+60 kg	+60 kg	+60 kg	+60 kg	+60 kg	+60 kg	+60 kg
Honda Civic WTCC	0 kg	0 kg	+20 kg	+60 kg	+40 kg	+30 kg	0 kg	+40 kg	+40 kg	+40 kg
Chevrolet RML Cruze TC1	0 kg	0 kg	+40 kg	+50 kg	+20 kg	+20 kg	+10 kg	0 kg	0 kg	0 kg
Lada Vesta WTCC	0 kg	0 kg	0 kg	0 kg	+20 kg	+20 kg	0 kg	0 kg	0 kg	+10 kg

==== Results ====
Race	Race Name	Pole Position	Fastest lap	Winning driver	Winning team	Winning manufacturer	Independent winner	Report
1	Race of Argentina	(Argentina) José María López	(Argentina) José María López	(Argentina) José María López	(France) Citroën Total WTCC	(France) Citroën	(Hungary) Norbert Michelisz	Report
2	Race of Argentina		(France) Sébastien Loeb	(France) Sébastien Loeb	(France) Citroën Total WTCC	(France) Citroën	(Morocco) Mehdi Bennani	Report
3	Race of Morocco	(Argentina) José María López	(Argentina) José María López	(Argentina) José María López	(France) Citroën Total WTCC	(France) Citroën	(Morocco) Mehdi Bennani	Report
4	Race of Morocco		(Argentina) José María López	(France) Yvan Muller	(France) Citroën Total WTCC	(France) Citroën	(United Kingdom) Tom Chilton	Report
5	Race of Hungary	(France) Yvan Muller	(Argentina) José María López	(Argentina) José María López	(France) Citroën Total WTCC	(France) Citroën	(France) Hugo Valente	Report
6	Race of Hungary		(Italy) Gabriele Tarquini	(Hungary) Norbert Michelisz	(Hungary) Zengő Motorsport	(Japan) Honda	(Hungary) Norbert Michelisz	Report
7	Race of Germany	(Argentina) José María López	(Argentina) José María López	(Argentina) José María López	(France) Citroën Total WTCC	(France) Citroën	(Hungary) Norbert Michelisz	Report
8	Race of Germany		(France) Yvan Muller	(France) Yvan Muller	(France) Citroën Total WTCC	(France) Citroën	(Morocco) Mehdi Bennani	Report
9	Race of Russia	(France) Yvan Muller	(France) Yvan Muller	(France) Yvan Muller	(France) Citroën Total WTCC	(France) Citroën	(United Kingdom) Tom Chilton	Report
10	Race of Russia		(United Kingdom) Robert Huff	(Portugal) Tiago Monteiro	(Japan) Honda Racing Team JAS	(Japan) Honda	(Hungary) Norbert Michelisz	Report
11	Race of Slovakia	(France) Yvan Muller	(France) Yvan Muller	(France) Yvan Muller	(France) Citroën Total WTCC	(France) Citroën	(France) Hugo Valente	Report
12	Race of Slovakia		(France) Sébastien Loeb	(France) Sébastien Loeb	(France) Citroën Total WTCC	(France) Citroën	(France) Hugo Valente	Report
13	Race of France	(France) Sébastien Loeb	(France) Sébastien Loeb	(France) Sébastien Loeb	(France) Citroën Total WTCC	(France) Citroën	(United Kingdom) Tom Chilton	Report
14	Race of France		(Argentina) José María López	(Argentina) José María López	(France) Citroën Total WTCC	(France) Citroën	(Hungary) Norbert Michelisz	Report
15	Race of Portugal	(Argentina) José María López	(Argentina) José María López	(Argentina) José María López	(France) Citroën Total WTCC	(France) Citroën	(Hungary) Norbert Michelisz	Report
16	Race of Portugal		(China) Ma Qing Hua	(China) Ma Qing Hua	(France) Citroën Total WTCC	(France) Citroën	(Hungary) Norbert Michelisz	Report
17	Race of Japan	(Hungary) Norbert Michelisz	(Italy) Gabriele Tarquini	(Argentina) José María López	(France) Citroën Total WTCC	(France) Citroën	(Hungary) Norbert Michelisz	Report
18	Race of Japan		(Portugal) Tiago Monteiro	(Portugal) Tiago Monteiro	(Japan) Honda Racing Team JAS	(Japan) Honda	(France) Hugo Valente	Report
19	Race of China	(Argentina) José María López	(Argentina) José María López	(Argentina) José María López	(France) Citroën Total WTCC	(France) Citroën	(Morocco) Mehdi Bennani	Report
20	Race of China		(France) Sébastien Loeb	(France) Yvan Muller	(France) Citroën Total WTCC	(France) Citroën	(Morocco) Mehdi Bennani	Report
21	Race of Thailand	(Argentina) José María López	(France) Sébastien Loeb	(Argentina) José María López	(France) Citroën Total WTCC	(France) Citroën	(Morocco) Mehdi Bennani	Report
22	Race of Thailand		(Italy) Gabriele Tarquini	(France) Sébastien Loeb	(France) Citroën Total WTCC	(France) Citroën	(United Kingdom) Tom Chilton	Report
23	Race of Qatar	(Argentina) José María López	(Argentina) José María López	(Argentina) José María López	(France) Citroën Total WTCC	(France) Citroën	(Morocco) Mehdi Bennani	Report
24	Race of Qatar		(France) Yvan Muller	(France) Yvan Muller	(France) Citroën Total WTCC	(France) Citroën	(Hungary) Norbert Michelisz	Report

=== Championship standings ===
==== Drivers' championship ====
Pos.	Driver	ARG (Argentina)		MAR (Morocco)		HUN (Hungary)		DEU (Germany)		RUS (Russia)		SVK (Slovakia)		FRA (France)		PRT (Portugal)		JPN (Japan)		CHN (China)		THA (Thailand)		QAT (Qatar)		Pts.
1	(Argentina) José María López	**1**^{1}	2	**1**^{1}	3	1^{3}	6	**1**^{1}	2	2^{2}	12	2^{2}	2	3^{3}	1	**1**^{1}	5	1^{2}	Ret	**1**^{1}	3	**1**^{1}	3	**1**^{1}	8	475
2	(France) Yvan Muller	2^{2}	11	5	**1**	**2**^{1}	7	3	1	**1**^{1}	6	**1**^{1}	3	2^{2}	4	7	2	5	15†	2^{5}	1	Ret^{3}	Ret	6	1	357
3	(France) Sébastien Loeb	3^{3}	1	3	2	6^{4}	5	2^{3}	5	9	7	3^{3}	1	**1**^{1}	Ret	2^{2}	15†	6^{3}	4	3^{4}	4	2^{2}	1	4^{3}	4	356
4	(China) Ma Qing Hua	7^{4}	6	2^{3}	10	4^{5}	9	5^{5}	Ret	5	5	Ret	Ret	4^{4}	3	6	**1**	4^{5}	5	10†^{2}	8	3^{4}	2	5	2	241
5	(Italy) Gabriele Tarquini	5	4	7	5	DSQ	13	6	4	3^{3}	Ret	6	4	8	5	4^{5}	3	3	12	Ret	2	5	5	15	7	197
6	(Hungary) Norbert Michelisz	6	7	8	11	8	**1**	4^{4}	Ret	7	3	Ret	8	6	2	3^{4}	4	**2**^{1}	14†	6	11	Ret	**12**	7	3	193
7	(Portugal) Tiago Monteiro	4^{5}	3	6	Ret	5	4	Ret	**3**	8	**1**	8	9	7	Ret	5	Ret	9	1	7	6	7	DSQ	8	9	177
8	(Morocco) Mehdi Bennani	13	5	4^{2}	12	11	Ret	7	6	14	Ret	Ret	7	9	**9**	11	10	7^{4}	10	5	7	4^{5}	7	2^{2}	5	127
9	(France) Hugo Valente	Ret	DNS	15^{4}	9	3^{2}	8	Ret^{2}	DNS	12	8	5	5	Ret	6	Ret^{3}	7	10	**2**	8	**Ret**	Ret	DNS	3^{4}	6	120
10	(United Kingdom) Robert Huff	Ret	Ret	10	Ret	9	Ret	Ret	7	4^{4}	2	4^{4}	Ret	Ret	DNS	10	9	8	3	Ret	5	6	6	12	Ret	103
11	(United Kingdom) Tom Chilton	8	8	14^{5}	4	7	3	9	DNS	6^{5}	9	7	Ret	5^{5}	8	14	13	Ret	6	Ret	DNS	11†	4	13	13	96
12	(Netherlands) Nick Catsburg									11	4	Ret^{5}	Ret	Ret	12	9	6	Ret	Ret	4^{3}	Ret	Ret	DNS	9^{5}	Ret	41
13	(Netherlands) Tom Coronel	14†	Ret	Ret	Ret	10	2	Ret	8	17†	10	9	10	12	7	12	11	Ret	7	Ret	DNS	Ret	DNS	11	12	39
14	(Italy) Stefano D'Aste	9	Ret	9	6	14	12	8	Ret	16	14	11	12	14	15†	13	Ret	14	9	9	13†	8	8	17	Ret	28
15	(Netherlands) Jaap van Lagen							11	9	10	Ret	NC	**6**	10	11	8	Ret									16
16	(France) Nicolas Lapierre																	11	8	DSQ	9	Ret	DNS	10	10	8
17	(United Kingdom) James Thompson	NC	**Ret**	11	7	DNS	DNS																			6
18	(France) John Filippi	Ret	12	13	8	13	11	12	10	NC	15	12	14	15	13	15	14	13	11	NC	10	Ret	11	14	**15**	6
19	(Argentina) Néstor Girolami											10	11			DSQ	8									5
20	(France) Grégoire Demoustier	12	10	Ret	Ret	12	10	13	12	15	13	Ret	13	13	14	16	12	12	13	Ret	12	9	10	18†	11	5
21	(Sweden) Rickard Rydell	10	9							13	11			11	10											4
22	(Thailand) Tin Sritrai																					10	9			3
23	(Germany) Sabine Schmitz							10	11																	1
—	(Serbia) Dušan Borković	11	Ret	DNS	DNS																					0
—	(Russia) Mikhail Kozlovskiy			12	Ret	Ret	Ret																			0
—	(Slovakia) Maťo Homola											13	15													0
—	(Qatar) Nasser Al-Attiyah																							16	14	0
Pos.	Driver	ARG (Argentina)		MAR (Morocco)		HUN (Hungary)		DEU (Germany)		RUS (Russia)		SVK (Slovakia)		FRA (France)		PRT (Portugal)		JPN (Japan)		CHN (China)		THA (Thailand)		QAT (Qatar)		Pts.

Colour	Result
Gold	Winner
Silver	Second place
Bronze	Third place
Green	Points classification
Blue	Non-points classification
Blue	Non-classified finish (NC)
Purple	Retired, not classified (Ret)
Red	Did not qualify (DNQ)
Red	Did not pre-qualify (DNPQ)
Black	Disqualified (DSQ)
White	Did not start (DNS)
White	Withdrew (WD)
White	Race cancelled (C)
Blank	Did not practice (DNP)
Blank	Did not arrive (DNA)
Blank	Excluded (EX)

**Bold** – Pole
Italics – Fastest Lap

† – Drivers did not finish the race, but were classified as they completed over 75% of the race distance.

==== Manufacturers' Championship ====
Pos.	Manufacturer	ARG (Argentina)		MAR (Morocco)		HUN (Hungary)		DEU (Germany)		RUS (Russia)		SVK (Slovakia)		FRA (France)		PRT (Portugal)		JPN (Japan)		CHN (China)		THA (Thailand)		QAT (Qatar)		Points
1	(France) Citroën	1^{1}	1	1^{1}	1	1^{1}	5	1^{1}	1	1^{1}	5	1^{1}	1	1^{1}	1	1^{1}	1	1^{2}	4	1^{1}	1	1^{1}	1	1^{1}	1	1069
1	(France) Citroën	2^{2}	2	2^{2}	2	2^{2}	6	2^{2}	2	2^{2}	6	2^{2}	2	2^{2}	3	2^{2}	2	4^{3}	5	2^{2}	3	2^{2}	2	2^{2}	2	1069
2	(Japan) Honda	4^{3}	3	6^{3}	5	5^{3}	1	4^{3}	3	3^{3}	1	6^{5}	4	6^{3}	2	3^{3}	3	2^{1}	1	6^{5}	2	5^{4}	5	7^{4}	3	721
2	(Japan) Honda	5^{4}	4	7^{4}	11	8^{5}	4	6^{5}	4	7^{5}	3	8	8	7^{4}	5	4^{4}	4	3^{4}	12	7	6	7^{5}	12	8^{5}	7	721
3	(Russia) Lada	NC^{5}	Ret	10^{5}	7	9^{4}	Ret	11^{4}	7	4^{4}	2	4^{3}	6	10^{5}	11	8^{5}	6	8^{5}	3	4^{3}	5	6^{3}	6	9^{3}	10	360
3	(Russia) Lada	Ret	Ret	11	Ret	Ret	Ret	Ret	9	10	4	NC^{4}	Ret	Ret	12	9	9	11	8	Ret^{4}	9	Ret	DNS	10	Ret	360
Pos.	Manufacturer	ARG (Argentina)		MAR (Morocco)		HUN (Hungary)		DEU (Germany)		RUS (Russia)		SVK (Slovakia)		FRA (France)		PRT (Portugal)		JPN (Japan)		CHN (China)		THA (Thailand)		QAT (Qatar)		Pts.

==== Yokohama Trophies ====
World Touring Car Championship promoter Eurosport Events organized the Yokohama Drivers' Trophy and the Yokohama Teams' Trophy within the 2015 FIA World Touring Car Championship.

===== Yokohama Drivers' Trophy =====
Pos.	Driver	ARG (Argentina)		MAR (Morocco)		HUN (Hungary)		DEU (Germany)		RUS (Russia)		SVK (Slovakia)		FRA (France)		PRT (Portugal)		JPN (Japan)		CHN (China)		THA (Thailand)		QAT (Qatar)		Pts.
1	(Hungary) Norbert Michelisz	6	7	8	11	8	1	4	Ret	7	3	Ret	8	6	2	3	4	**2**	14	6	11	Ret	12	7	3	168
2	(Morocco) Mehdi Bennani	13	5	**4**	12	11	Ret	7	6	14	Ret	Ret	7	9	9	11	10	7	10	5	7	**4**	7	**2**	5	164
3	(United Kingdom) Tom Chilton	**8**	8	14	4	7	3	9	DNS	**6**	9	7	Ret	**5**	8	14	13	Ret	6	Ret	DNS	Ret	4	13	13	124
4	(France) Hugo Valente	Ret	DNS	15	9	**3**	8	**Ret**	DNS	12	8	**5**	5	Ret	6	**Ret**	7	10	2	8	Ret	Ret	DNS	3	6	118
5	(Italy) Stefano D'Aste	9	Ret	9	6	14	12	8	Ret	16	14	11	12	14	15	13	Ret	14	9	9	13	8	8	17	Ret	88
6	(Netherlands) Tom Coronel	14	Ret	Ret	Ret	10	2	Ret	8	17†	10	9	10	12	7	12	11	Ret	7	Ret	DNS	Ret	DNS	11	12	78
7	(France) Grégoire Demoustier	12	10	Ret	Ret	12	10	13	12	15	13	Ret	13	13	14	16	12	12	13	Ret	12	9	10	18	11	72
8	(France) John Filippi	Ret	12	13	8	13	11	12	10	NC	15	12	14	15	13	15	14	13	11	**Ret**	10	Ret	11	14	15	71
9	(Thailand) Tin Sritrai																					10	9			10
10	(Germany) Sabine Schmitz							10	11																	9
11	(Serbia) Dušan Borković	11	Ret	DNS	DNS																					5
12	(Slovakia) Maťo Homola											13	15													4
13	(Qatar) Nasser Al-Attiyah																							16	14	4
Pos.	Driver	ARG (Argentina)		MAR (Morocco)		HUN (Hungary)		DEU (Germany)		RUS (Russia)		SVK (Slovakia)		FRA (France)		PRT (Portugal)		JPN (Japan)		CHN (China)		THA (Thailand)		QAT (Qatar)		Pts.

===== Yokohama Teams' Trophy =====
All non-manufacturer teams were eligible to score points towards the Yokohama Teams' Trophy.

Pos.	Team	ARG (Argentina)		MAR (Morocco)		HUN (Hungary)		DEU (Germany)		RUS (Russia)		SVK (Slovakia)		FRA (France)		PRT (Portugal)		JPN (Japan)		CHN (China)		THA (Thailand)		QAT (Qatar)		Pts.
1	(Italy) ROAL Motorsport	8	8	14	4	7	2	9	8	6	9	7	10	5	7	12	11	Ret	6	Ret	DNS	Ret	4	11	12	191
1	(Italy) ROAL Motorsport	14	Ret	Ret	Ret	10	3	Ret	DNS	17†	10	9	Ret	12	8	14	13	Ret	7	Ret	DNS	Ret	DNS	13	13	191
2	(Spain) Campos Racing	Ret	12	13	8	3	8	12	10	12	8	5	5	15	6	15	7	10	2	8	10	10	9	3	6	182
2	(Spain) Campos Racing	Ret	DNS	15	9	13	11	Ret	DNS	NC	15	12	14	Ret	13	Ret	14	13	11	Ret	Ret	Ret	11	14	14	182
3	(Hungary) Zengő Motorsport	6	7	8	11	8	1	4	Ret	7	3	Ret	8	6	2	3	4	2	14	6	11	Ret	12	7	3	161
4	(France) Sébastien Loeb Racing	13	5	4	12	11	Ret	7	6	14	Ret	Ret	7	9	9	11	10	7	10	5	7	4	7	2	5	150
5	(Germany) ALL-INKL.COM Münnich Motorsport	9	Ret	9	6	14	12	8	11	16	14	11	12	14	15†	13	Ret	14	9	9	13	8	8	17	Ret	89
5	(Germany) ALL-INKL.COM Münnich Motorsport							10	Ret																	89
6	(United Kingdom) Craft-Bamboo	12	10	Ret	Ret	12	10	13	12	15	13	Ret	13	13	14	16	12	12	13	Ret	12	9	10	18	11	64
7	(Sweden) Nika International	10	9							13	11	10	11	11	10	DSQ	8									42
8	(Italy) Proteam Racing	11	Ret	DNS	DNS																					4
Pos.	Team	ARG (Argentina)		MAR (Morocco)		HUN (Hungary)		DEU (Germany)		RUS (Russia)		SVK (Slovakia)		FRA (France)		PRT (Portugal)		JPN (Japan)		CHN (China)		THA (Thailand)		QAT (Qatar)		Pts.

† – Drivers did not finish the race, but were classified as they completed over 75% of the race distance.
