= 2014 FIA WTCC Race of Japan =

Race details
- Round 11 of 12 in the 2014 World Touring Car Championship at Suzuka Circuit in Suzuka City, Japan.
- Date: 26 October, 2014
- Location: Suzuka City, Japan
- Course: Suzuka Circuit; 5.807 kilometres (3.608 mi)

Race One
- Laps: 11
Pole position
| Driver | | (Argentina) José María López | Citroën Total WTCC |
| Time | | 2:05.439 | |
Podium
| First | | (Argentina) José María López | Citroën Total WTCC |
| Second | | (United Kingdom) Tom Chilton | ROAL Motorsport |
| Third | | (France) Sébastien Loeb | Citroën Total WTCC |
Fastest Lap
| Driver | | (Argentina) José María López | Citroën Total WTCC |
| Time | | 2:09.279 | |

Race Two
- Laps: 11
Podium
| First | | (Italy) Gabriele Tarquini | Castrol Honda Team |
| Second | | (Serbia) Dušan Borković | Campos Racing |
| Third | | (Hungary) Norbert Michelisz | Zengő Motorsport |
Fastest Lap
| Driver | | (Italy) Gabriele Tarquini | Castrol Honda Team |
| Time | | 2:09.063 | |

The 2014 FIA WTCC Race of Japan (formally the 2014 FIA WTCC JVC Kenwood Race of Japan) was the eleventh round of the 2014 World Touring Car Championship season and the seventh running of the FIA WTCC Race of Japan. It was held on 26 October 2014 at the Suzuka Circuit in Suzuka City, Japan. This was the first time the race was held on the full Grand Prix layout.

Race one was won by José María López for Citroën Total WTCC and race two was won by Gabriele Tarquini for the Castrol Honda World Touring Car Team. López secured his first World Touring Car Championship drivers' title in race one, becoming the first Argentine driver to win a world drivers' championship since Juan Manuel Fangio in 1957.

== Background ==
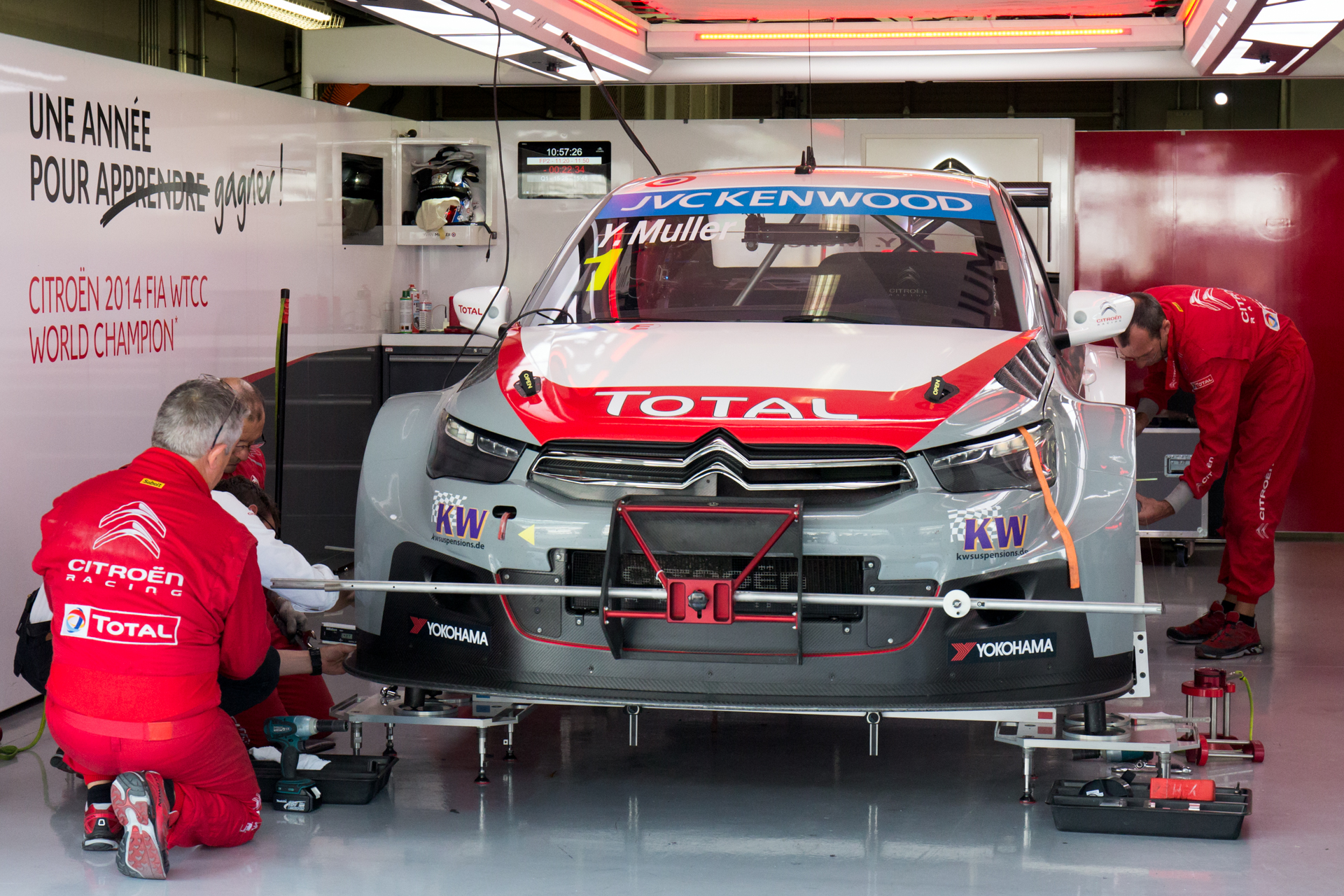
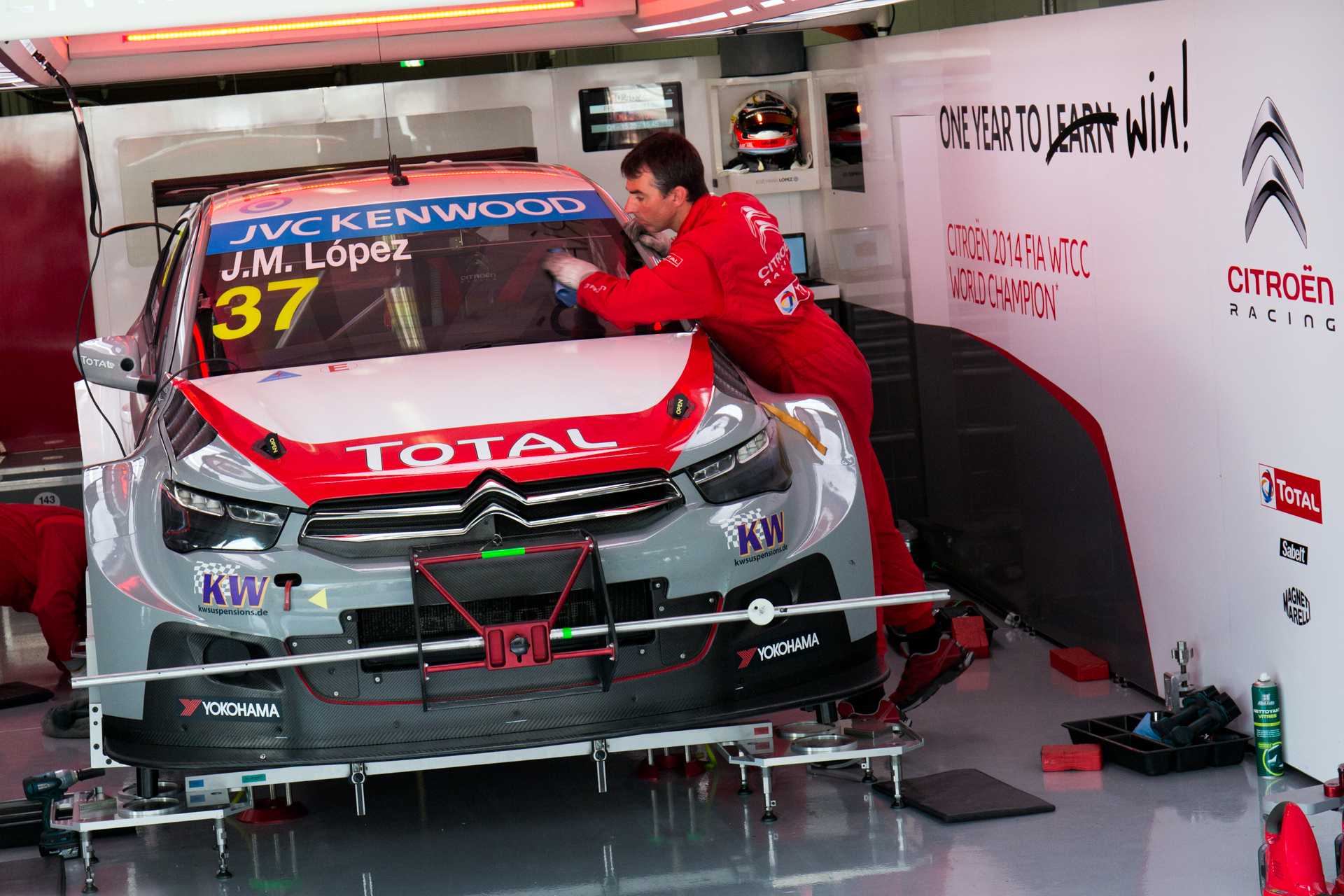
Citroën celebrates the 2014 world championship title which secured at the previous round.

López led the drivers' championship coming into the round, ninety–three points ahead of teammate Yvan Muller. Franz Engstler had secured the Yokohama Trophy title at the previous race in Shanghai.

Campos Racing put another different driver in their second TC2 SEAT with Henry Kwong replacing William Lok. Citroën Total WTCC reduced to three cars with Ma Qing Hua not participating in the Japanese round.

When the compensation weights were revised after the previous round; the Citroën C-Elysée WTCC retained the maximum ballast to keep their weight at 1,160 kilograms (2,557 lb). The Honda Civic WTCCs gained 10 kilograms (22 lb) of ballast to weigh–in at 1,130 kilograms (2,491 lb) and the Chevrolet RML Cruze TC1s lost 10 kilograms (22 lb) to equal their weight to the Hondas on 1,130 kilograms (2,491 lb). The Lada Granta 1.6Ts remained at the base weight of 1,100 kilograms (2,425 lb).

== Report ==
=== Testing and free practice ===
López set the pace in Friday testing, the session had been stopped briefly following an off for Kwong which left gravel scattered across the track.

Muller was at the top of timing pages in first free practice on Saturday morning, López was second and Gabriele Tarquini's Honda was third.

Muller was quickest ahead of Gianni Morbidelli in free practice two. Dušan Borković hit trouble early on, oversteering into the trackside barriers at turn eight and causing considerable damage to his Chevrolet.

=== Qualifying ===
Muller was quickest in the first part of qualifying. The session was interrupted at the halfway stage when Felipe De Souza spun off and beached his Liqui Moly Team Engstler BMW in the gravel. After a brief delay the session resumed with ten minutes remaining, Tom Chilton was quickest early on before López and Muller set their first competitive times. The Ladas waited in the pit lane before going out with Robert Huff in twelfth place in the times. In the final few minutes of the session Norbert Michelisz moved into eleventh place, bumping Huff down and out of a place in Q2.

Muller was quickest once again in the second session ahead of López and Sébastien Loeb, Chilton and Hugo Valente were fourth and fifth. All four Honda drivers missed out on progressing to Q3 but Gabriele Tarquini finished tenth which would put him on pole for race two, Dušan Borković would share the front row with him.

In Q3 López took pole with Muller and Loeb helping Citroën fill the top three places. Chilton and Valente completed the Q3 results.

=== Race One ===
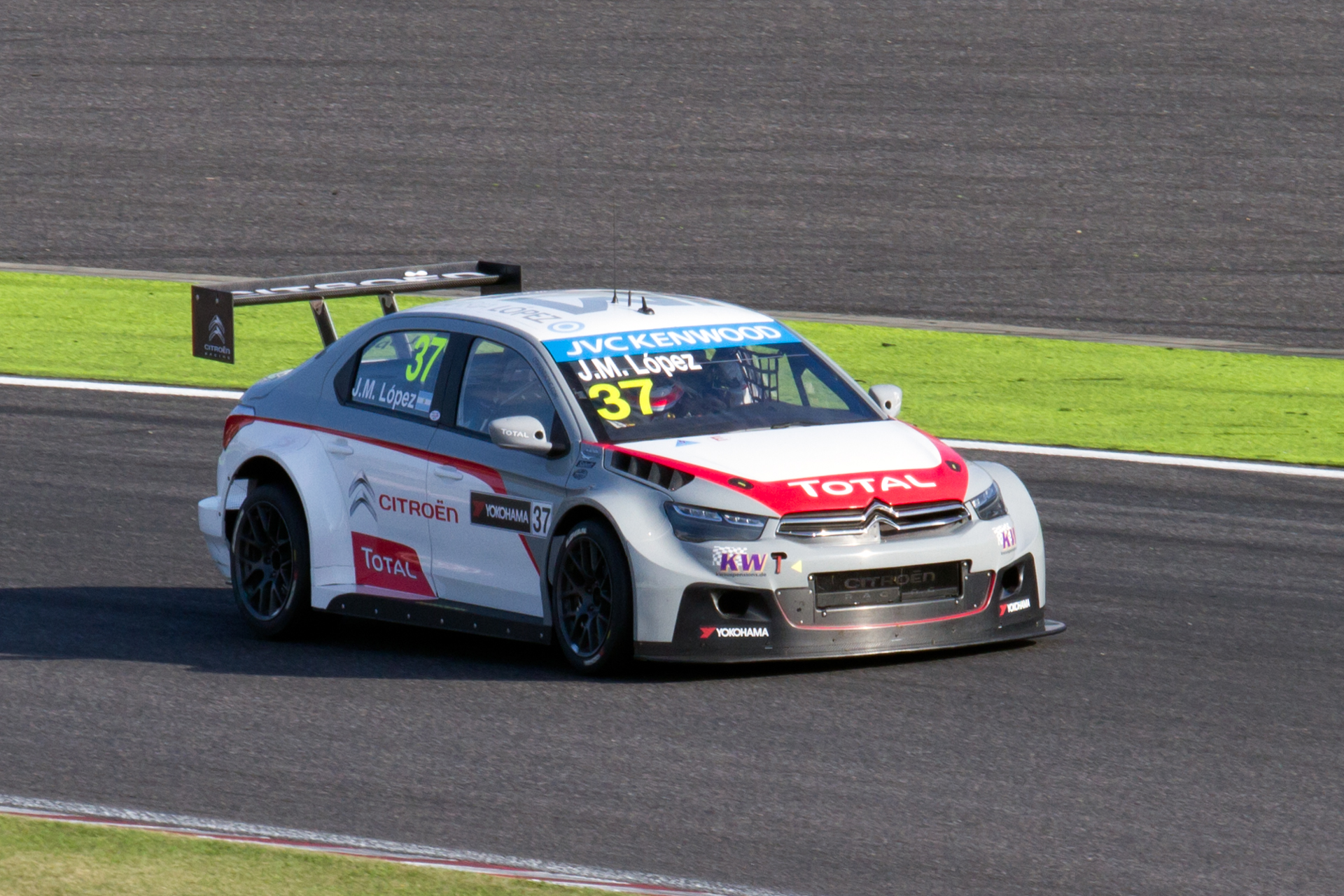
López won the Race 1 and the drivers' championship title.

López led Muller in the open stages of the race, behind them the battle for third was being contested between Chilton, Valente and Loeb. On lap seven Muller suffered a left-rear puncture and crawled back to the pits to retire, promoting Valente to second. Chilton passed Valente to take second at Spoon Curve on lap ten, Valente then ran wide at 130R which allowed Loeb through and Michelisz ran through the Casio Chicane while he also tried to pass the slow Chevrolet of Valente. After leading every lap, López won the race and secured the drivers' championship title in his first full season. Franz Engstler was the winner in the TC2 class.

=== Race Two ===
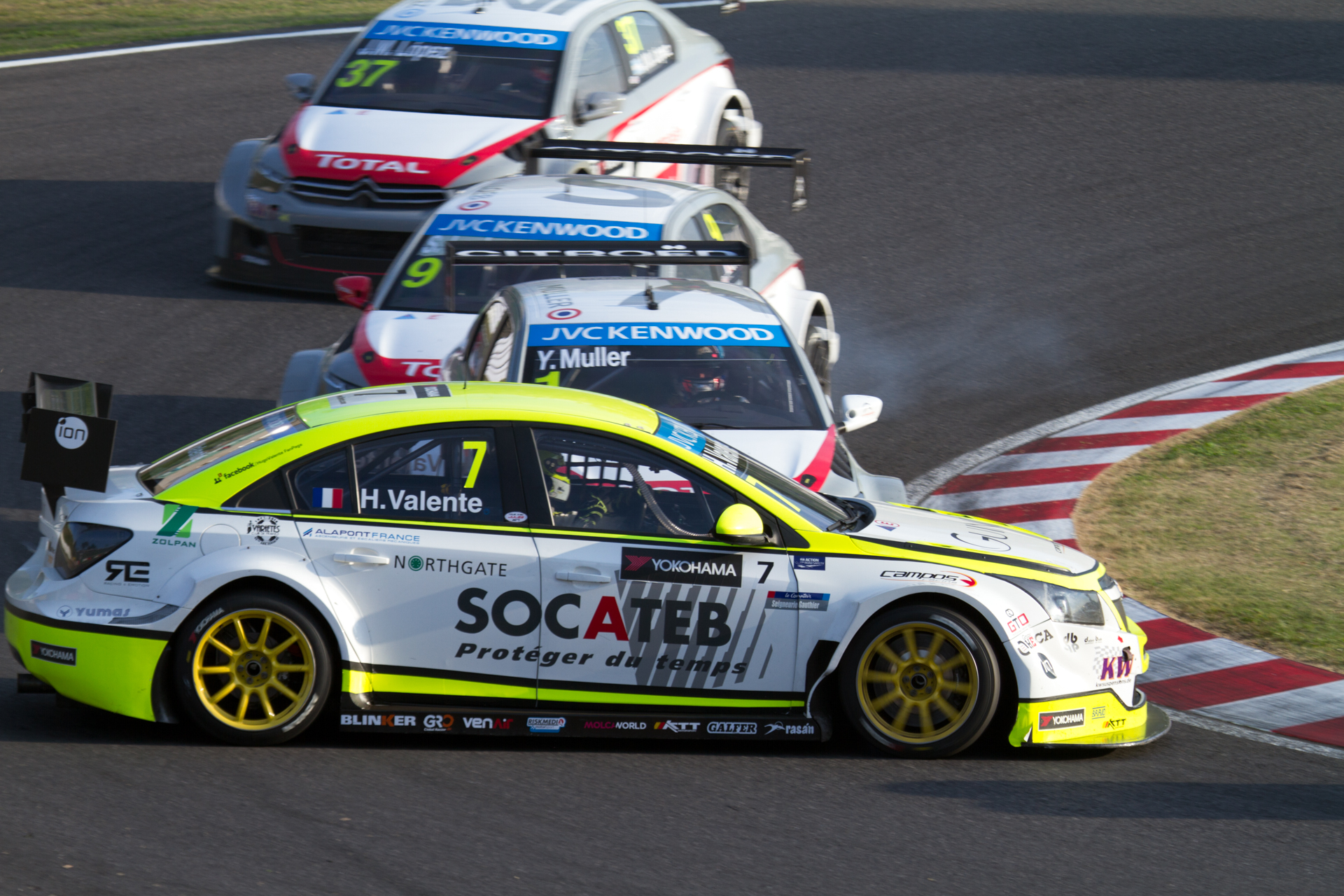
Muller hits Valente on lap 5.

Tarquini led Borković away from the start, at the end of the first lap Michelisz tapped the back of Borković forcing the Serbian driver to cut the chicane. On the second lap López had a moment at 130R and ran wide as he ran in the slipstream of his Citroën teammates, Loeb ahead of him did the same on the following lap. On lap five Loeb braked too late into the hairpin, at the same time Muller ran into the back of Valente who suffered rear suspension failure in the collision and slowed. As Muller and Loeb slowed, López was able to catch and pass Loeb to move up to sixth place. Borković began to close in on Tarquini in the last few laps but Tarquini held on to take the win with Borković leading Michelisz across the line. John Filippi was the Yokohama Trophy winner for then first time in 2014.

== Results ==
=== Qualifying ===
| Pos. | No. | Name | Team | Car | C | Q1 | Q2 | Q3 | Points |
|---|---|---|---|---|---|---|---|---|---|
| 1 | 37 | (Argentina) José María López | Citroën Total WTCC | Citroën C-Elysée WTCC | **TC1** | 2:06.277 | 2:05.605 | 2:05.439 | **5** |
| 2 | 1 | (France) Yvan Muller | Citroën Total WTCC | Citroën C-Elysée WTCC | **TC1** | 2:06.115 | 2:05.512 | 2:05.514 | **4** |
| 3 | 9 | (France) Sébastien Loeb | Citroën Total WTCC | Citroën C-Elysée WTCC | **TC1** | 2:06.854 | 2:05.761 | 2:05.590 | **3** |
| 4 | 3 | (United Kingdom) Tom Chilton | ROAL Motorsport | Chevrolet RML Cruze TC1 | **TC1** | 2:06.790 | 2:06.035 | 2:06.321 | **2** |
| 5 | 7 | (France) Hugo Valente | Campos Racing | Chevrolet RML Cruze TC1 | **TC1** | 2:07.716 | 2:06.745 | 2:06.703 | **1** |
| 6 | 5 | (Hungary) Norbert Michelisz | Zengő Motorsport | Honda Civic WTCC | **TC1** | 2:07.803 | 2:06.865 | | |
| 7 | 10 | (Italy) Gianni Morbidelli | ALL-INKL.COM Münnich Motorsport | Chevrolet RML Cruze TC1 | **TC1** | 2:07.251 | 2:06.906 | | |
| 8 | 4 | (Netherlands) Tom Coronel | ROAL Motorsport | Chevrolet RML Cruze TC1 | **TC1** | 2:07.343 | 2:06.993 | | |
| 9 | 98 | (Serbia) Dušan Borković | Campos Racing | Chevrolet RML Cruze TC1 | **TC1** | 2:07.523 | 2:07.132 | | |
| 10 | 2 | (Italy) **Gabriele Tarquini** | Castrol Honda World Touring Car Team | Honda Civic WTCC | **TC1** | 2:07.041 | 2:07.305 | | |
| 11 | 18 | (Portugal) Tiago Monteiro | Castrol Honda World Touring Car Team | Honda Civic WTCC | **TC1** | 2:07.650 | 2:07.715 | | |
| 12 | 25 | (Morocco) Mehdi Bennani | Proteam Racing | Honda Civic WTCC | **TC1** | 2:07.851 | 2:08.140 | | |
| 13 | 12 | (United Kingdom) Robert Huff | Lukoil Lada Sport | Lada Granta 1.6T | **TC1** | 2:08.241 | | | |
| 14 | 11 | (United Kingdom) James Thompson | Lukoil Lada Sport | Lada Granta 1.6T | **TC1** | 2:08.677 | | | |
| 15 | 14 | (Russia) Mikhail Kozlovskiy | Lukoil Lada Sport | Lada Granta 1.6T | **TC1** | 2:09.472 | | | |
| 16 | 77 | (Germany) René Münnich | ALL-INKL.COM Münnich Motorsport | Chevrolet RML Cruze TC1 | **TC1** | 2:10.014 | | | |
| 17 | 6 | (Germany) Franz Engstler | Liqui Moly Team Engstler | BMW 320 TC | **TC2T** | 2:13.585 | | | |
| 18 | 27 | (France) John Filippi | Campos Racing | SEAT León WTCC | **TC2T** | 2:13.892 | | | |
| 19 | 26 | (Macau) Felipe De Souza | Liqui Moly Team Engstler | BMW 320 TC | **TC2T** **A** | 2:16.951 | | | |
107% time: 2:22.935 (TC2T)
| – | 19 | (Hong Kong) Henry Kwong | Campos Racing | SEAT León WTCC | **TC2T** **A** | no time set | | | |

- **Bold** denotes Pole position for second race.

=== Race 1 ===
| Pos. | No. | Name | Team | Car | C | Laps | Time/Retired | Grid | Points |
|---|---|---|---|---|---|---|---|---|---|
| 1 | 37 | (Argentina) **José María López** | Citroën Total WTCC | Citroën C-Elysée WTCC | **TC1** | 11 | 23:54.343 | 1 | 25 |
| 2 | 3 | (United Kingdom) Tom Chilton | ROAL Motorsport | Chevrolet RML Cruze TC1 | **TC1** | 11 | +8.473 | 4 | 18 |
| 3 | 9 | (France) Sébastien Loeb | Citroën Total WTCC | Citroën C-Elysée WTCC | **TC1** | 11 | +9.693 | 3 | 15 |
| 4 | 5 | (Hungary) Norbert Michelisz | Zengő Motorsport | Honda Civic WTCC | **TC1** | 11 | +10.414 | 6 | 12 |
| 5 | 7 | (France) Hugo Valente | Campos Racing | Chevrolet RML Cruze TC1 | **TC1** | 11 | +12.153 | 5 | 10 |
| 6 | 2 | (Italy) Gabriele Tarquini | Castrol Honda World Touring Car Team | Honda Civic WTCC | **TC1** | 11 | +12.707 | 10 | 8 |
| 7 | 4 | (Netherlands) Tom Coronel | ROAL Motorsport | Chevrolet RML Cruze TC1 | **TC1** | 11 | +13.514 | 8 | 6 |
| 8 | 98 | (Serbia) Dušan Borković | Campos Racing | Chevrolet RML Cruze TC1 | **TC1** | 11 | +14.340 | 9 | 4 |
| 9 | 18 | (Portugal) Tiago Monteiro | Castrol Honda World Touring Car Team | Honda Civic WTCC | **TC1** | 11 | +16.507 | 11 | 2 |
| 10 | 10 | (Italy) Gianni Morbidelli | ALL-INKL.COM Münnich Motorsport | Chevrolet RML Cruze TC1 | **TC1** | 11 | +17.846 | 7 | 1 |
| 11 | 25 | (Morocco) Mehdi Bennani | Proteam Racing | Honda Civic WTCC | **TC1** | 11 | +20.907 | 12 | |
| 12 | 12 | (United Kingdom) Robert Huff | Lukoil Lada Sport | Lada Granta 1.6T | **TC1** | 11 | +21.696 | 13 | |
| 13 | 11 | (United Kingdom) James Thompson | Lukoil Lada Sport | Lada Granta 1.6T | **TC1** | 11 | +22.802 | 14 | |
| 14 | 14 | (Russia) Mikhail Kozlovskiy | Lukoil Lada Sport | Lada Granta 1.6T | **TC1** | 11 | +32.602 | 15 | |
| 15 | 6 | (Germany) Franz Engstler | Liqui Moly Team Engstler | BMW 320 TC | **TC2T** | 11 | +1:16.593 | 17 | |
| 16 | 27 | (France) John Filippi | Campos Racing | SEAT León WTCC | **TC2T** | 11 | +1:19.083 | 18 | |
| 17 | 19 | (Hong Kong) Henry Kwong | Campos Racing | SEAT León WTCC | **TC2T** **A** | 11 | 2:15.944 | 20 | |
| Ret | 1 | (France) Yvan Muller | Citroën Total WTCC | Citroën C-Elysée WTCC | **TC1** | 7 | Puncture | 2 | |
| NC | 77 | (Germany) René Münnich | ALL-INKL.COM Münnich Motorsport | Chevrolet RML Cruze TC1 | **TC1** | 7 | +4 Laps | 16 | |
| Ret | 26 | (Macau) Felipe De Souza | Liqui Moly Team Engstler | BMW 320 TC | **TC2T** **A** | 2 | Retired | 19 | |

Bold denotes Fastest lap.

=== Race 2 ===
| Pos. | No. | Name | Team | Car | C | Laps | Time/Retired | Grid | Points |
|---|---|---|---|---|---|---|---|---|---|
| 1 | 2 | (Italy) **Gabriele Tarquini** | Castrol Honda World Touring Car Team | Honda Civic WTCC | **TC1** | 11 | 23:55.783 | 1 | 25 |
| 2 | 98 | (Serbia) Dušan Borković | Campos Racing | Chevrolet RML Cruze TC1 | **TC1** | 11 | +1.725 | 2 | 18 |
| 3 | 5 | (Hungary) Norbert Michelisz | Zengő Motorsport | Honda Civic WTCC | **TC1** | 11 | +4.360 | 5 | 15 |
| 4 | 4 | (Netherlands) Tom Coronel | ROAL Motorsport | Chevrolet RML Cruze TC1 | **TC1** | 11 | +5.497 | 3 | 12 |
| 5 | 1 | (France) Yvan Muller | Citroën Total WTCC | Citroën C-Elysée WTCC | **TC1** | 11 | +6.116 | 9 | 10 |
| 6 | 37 | (Argentina) José María López | Citroën Total WTCC | Citroën C-Elysée WTCC | **TC1** | 11 | +6.346 | 10 | 8 |
| 7 | 9 | (France) Sébastien Loeb | Citroën Total WTCC | Citroën C-Elysée WTCC | **TC1** | 11 | +6.665 | 8 | 6 |
| 8 | 10 | (Italy) Gianni Morbidelli | ALL-INKL.COM Münnich Motorsport | Chevrolet RML Cruze TC1 | **TC1** | 11 | +14.062 | 4 | 4 |
| 9 | 18 | (Portugal) Tiago Monteiro | Castrol Honda World Touring Car Team | Honda Civic WTCC | **TC1** | 11 | +14.791 | 11 | 2 |
| 10 | 3 | (United Kingdom) Tom Chilton | ROAL Motorsport | Chevrolet RML Cruze TC1 | **TC1** | 11 | +15.104 | 7 | 1 |
| 11 | 12 | (United Kingdom) Robert Huff | Lukoil Lada Sport | Lada Granta 1.6T | **TC1** | 11 | +16.916 | 13 | |
| 12 | 11 | (United Kingdom) James Thompson | Lukoil Lada Sport | Lada Granta 1.6T | **TC1** | 11 | +18.818 | 14 | |
| 13 | 14 | (Russia) Mikhail Kozlovskiy | Lukoil Lada Sport | Lada Granta 1.6T | **TC1** | 11 | +26.036 | 15 | |
| 14 | 27 | (France) John Filippi | Campos Racing | SEAT León WTCC | **TC2T** | 11 | +1:26.585 | 18 | |
| 15 | 26 | (Macau) Felipe De Souza | Liqui Moly Team Engstler | BMW 320 TC | **TC2T** **A** | 11 | +1:50.307 | 20 | |
| 16 | 77 | (Germany) René Münnich | ALL-INKL.COM Münnich Motorsport | Chevrolet RML Cruze TC1 | **TC1** | 11 | 2:21.310 | 16 | |
| Ret | 7 | (France) Hugo Valente | Campos Racing | Chevrolet RML Cruze TC1 | **TC1** | 5 | Race incident | 6 | |
| NC | 19 | (Hong Kong) Henry Kwong | Campos Racing | SEAT León WTCC | **TC2T** **A** | 5 | +6 Laps | 19 | |
| Ret | 6 | (Germany) Franz Engstler | Liqui Moly Team Engstler | BMW 320 TC | **TC2T** | 4 | Driveshaft | 17 | |
| Ret | 25 | (Morocco) Mehdi Bennani | Proteam Racing | Honda Civic WTCC | **TC1** | 0 | Technical | 12 | |

Bold denotes Fastest lap.

== Standings after the event ==
Drivers' Championship standings

| Pos | Driver | Points |
|---|---|---|
| 1 | (Argentina) José María López | 422 |
| 2 | (France) Yvan Muller | 305 |
| 3 | (France) Sébastien Loeb | 275 |
| 4 | (Portugal) Tiago Monteiro | 174 |
| 5 | (Hungary) Norbert Michelisz | 169 |

Yokohama Trophy standings

| Pos | Driver | Points |
|---|---|---|
| 1 | (Germany) Franz Engstler | 226 |
| 2 | (France) John Filippi | 143 |
| 3 | (Italy) Pasquale Di Sabatino | 98 |
| 4 | (Macau) Felipe De Souza | 26 |
| 5 | (Argentina) Camilo Echevarría | 12 |

Manufacturers' Championship standings

| Pos | Manufacturer | Points |
|---|---|---|
| 1 | (France) Citroën | 927 |
| 2 | (Japan) Honda | 649 |
| 3 | (Russia) Lada | 371 |

- Note: Only the top five positions are included for both sets of drivers' standings.
