= 2014 FIA WTCC Race of Belgium =

Race details
- Round 7 of 12 in the 2014 World Touring Car Championship at Circuit de Spa-Francorchamps in Francorchamps, Belgium.
- Date: 22 June, 2014
- Location: Francorchamps, Belgium
- Course: Circuit de Spa-Francorchamps; 7.004 kilometres (4.352 mi)

Race One
- Laps: 9
Pole position
Driver		(France) Yvan Muller	Citroën Total WTCC
Time		2:23.497	
Podium
First		(France) Yvan Muller	Citroën Total WTCC
Second		(Argentina) José María López	Citroën Total WTCC
Third		(France) Sébastien Loeb	Citroën Total WTCC
Fastest Lap
Driver		(France) Yvan Muller	Citroën Total WTCC
Time		2:26.579	

Race Two
- Laps: 9
Podium
First		(Argentina) José María López	Citroën Total WTCC
Second		(France) Yvan Muller	Citroën Total WTCC
Third		(Netherlands) Tom Coronel	ROAL Motorsport
Fastest Lap
Driver		(Argentina) José María López	Citroën Total WTCC
Time		2:26.679	

The 2014 FIA WTCC Race of Belgium was the seventh round of the 2014 World Touring Car Championship season and the fourth running of the FIA WTCC Race of Belgium after an absence of two seasons. It was held on 22 June 2014 at the Circuit de Spa-Francorchamps in Francorchamps, Belgium.

Both races were won by Citroën Total WTCC; Yvan Muller won race one from pole position and José María López won race two.

== Background ==
López continued to lead the drivers' championship after the first six rounds, forty–one points ahead of teammate Yvan Muller. Franz Engstler held the lead of the Yokohama Trophy.

European Touring Car Cup racer Norbert Nagy joined Campos Racing for the Belgian round, driving a TC2 SEAT León WTCC.

The compensation weights remained unchanged after the previous round; the Citroën C-Elysée WTCC retained the maximum ballast to keep their weight at 1,160 kilograms (2,557 lb). The Honda Civic WTCCs and Chevrolet RML Cruze TC1s retained 20 kilograms (44 lb) of ballast to weigh–in at 1,120 kilograms (2,469 lb). The Lada Granta 1.6Ts remained at the base weight of 1,100 kilograms (2,425 lb).

Tiago Monteiro picked up a five–place grid penalty for the first race after colliding with Tom Chilton in race two at the FIA WTCC Race of Russia.

== Report ==
=== Testing and free practice ===
López led a Citroën 1–2 in Friday testing, Monteiro was third for Honda.

López led a Citroën 1–2–3–4 in free practice one, Hugo Valente was best of the rest.

López was ahead of Valente in free practice two. The session saw a number of drivers lose lap times for exceeding track limits.

=== Qualifying ===
Muller was quickest in the first part of qualifying, López and Loeb were second and third. The fourth Citroën of Ma Qing Hua had balance issues and set a best time slower than his practice times and ended up 14th behind the Lada of Robert Huff.

The second session saw many of the cars running together in order to get a slipstream to assist them on the fast straights, Muller was second in the pack behind Michelisz and went fastest before López quickly knocked him down to second. Sébastien Loeb was third with Valente fourth and Gabriele Tarquini the last of the five cars to make it through to Q3. Gianni Morbidelli finished tenth and claimed pole position for race two.

In the Q3 shootout it was Muller who claimed pole ahead of Loeb and López, Valente lined up fourth ahead of Tarquini.

After qualifying, Dušan Borković had an engine change in his Chevrolet Cruze and was dropped to the back of the grid for race one.

=== Race One ===
Borković's Chevrolet sprung an oil leak on the grid after his engine change, with sand applied to his grid slot as a result. At the start the three Citroëns got away while Tarquini attacked Valente for fourth and Monteiro and Michelisz battles for sixth. Chilton did not get away at the start and the rest of the field went around the stranded Chevrolet before he got going. Valente went wide at La Source but got back as Tarquini dropped back towards Monteiro the midfield pack. Morbidelli passed the two factory Hondas and took fifth place. Huff spun out on the oil on the track at turn 12 and dropped to the back of the field. Both Valente and Mehdi Bennani were given drive–through penalties for exceeding track limits as López and Loeb battled for second place at the start of lap four which gave Muller a chance to distance himself from his title rivals. The windscreen on Ma's car broke on lap six as he battled for tenth position with Chilton and Borković, the screen had bent and distorted his vision. On the last lap López passed Loeb for second place at Les Combes while Monteiro was close up behind Morbidelli in pursuit of fourth place. Muller claimed a dominant win with López second and Loeb in third completing the Citroën 1–2–3, Monteiro made a last corner lunge on Morbidelli which allowed Tom Coronel to close in and take fifth place at the line. Franz Engstler was the winner in the TC2 category.

=== Race Two ===
Morbidelli from pole position was passed around the outside of La Source by Coronel at the start of the race. The two ran side–by–side up to Eau Rouge where Coronel came out on top and took the lead. Valente and López made contact at Malmedy sending the Campos Chevrolet into a half spin and allowing Muller to follow López through the gap. Monteiro got ahead of Morbidelli and into second place at the end of the first lap as Coronel led by a second. López gained another position on lap two when he passed Tarquini as he was lining up a pass on Michelisz at Rivage; López picked off Michelisz at the Bus Stop at the end of lap two and then Morbidelli at the same place the following lap. Ma went into the pits on lap five to retire after struggling in both races. At the start of lap six Coronel was under pressure for the lead from López, Muller was following him through the pack and was fourth behind Monteiro. Coronel defended but López drew alongside at La Source and made the pass at Eau Rouge to take the lead. Shortly after Muller passed Monteiro and then Coronel as he chased his title rival. López led a Citroën 1–2 with Muller second and Coronel held on to third place. Franz Engstler was the TC2 winner once again.

== Results ==
=== Qualifying ===
Pos.	No.	Name	Team	Car	C	Q1	Q2	Q3	Points
1	1	(France) Yvan Muller	Citroën Total WTCC	Citroën C-Elysée WTCC	TC1	2:23.880	2:23.711	2:23.497	**5**
2	9	(France) Sébastien Loeb	Citroën Total WTCC	Citroën C-Elysée WTCC	TC1	2:24.311	2:23.867	2:23.643	**4**
3	37	(Argentina) José María López	Citroën Total WTCC	Citroën C-Elysée WTCC	TC1	2:23.996	2:23.204	2:23.688	**3**
4	7	(France) Hugo Valente	Campos Racing	Chevrolet RML Cruze TC1	TC1	2:25.023	2:24.512	2:24.646	**2**
5	2	(Italy) Gabriele Tarquini	Castrol Honda World Touring Car Team	Honda Civic WTCC	TC1	2:25.162	2:25.147	2:25.034	**1**
6	18	(Portugal) Tiago Monteiro	Castrol Honda World Touring Car Team	Honda Civic WTCC	TC1	2:25.803	2:25.165		
7	5	(Hungary) Norbert Michelisz	Zengő Motorsport	Honda Civic WTCC	TC1	2:25.839	2:25.333		
8	4	(Netherlands) Tom Coronel	ROAL Motorsport	Chevrolet RML Cruze TC1	TC1	2:25.811	2:25.351		
9	25	(Morocco) Mehdi Bennani	Proteam Racing	Honda Civic WTCC	TC1	2:25.957	2:25.549		
10	10	(Italy) **Gianni Morbidelli**	ALL-INKL.COM Münnich Motorsport	Chevrolet RML Cruze TC1	TC1	2:25.635	2:25.767		
11	98	(Serbia) Dušan Borković	Campos Racing	Chevrolet RML Cruze TC1	TC1	2:25.593	2:26.593		
12	3	(United Kingdom) Tom Chilton	ROAL Motorsport	Chevrolet RML Cruze TC1	TC1	2:25.813	2:26.918		
13	12	(United Kingdom) Robert Huff	Lukoil Lada Sport	Lada Granta 1.6T	TC1	2:27.042			
14	33	(China) Ma Qing Hua	Citroën Total WTCC	Citroën C-Elysée WTCC	TC1	2:27.044			
15	14	(Russia) Mikhail Kozlovskiy	Lukoil Lada Sport	Lada Granta 1.6T	TC1	2:27.923			
16	11	(United Kingdom) James Thompson	Lukoil Lada Sport	Lada Granta 1.6T	TC1	2:28.262			
17	77	(Germany) René Münnich	ALL-INKL.COM Münnich Motorsport	Chevrolet RML Cruze TC1	TC1	2:28.337			
18	6	(Germany) Franz Engstler	Liqui Moly Team Engstler	BMW 320 TC	TC2T	2:32.786			
19	8	(Italy) Pasquale Di Sabatino	Liqui Moly Team Engstler	BMW 320 TC	TC2T	2:34.031			
20	27	(France) John Filippi	Campos Racing	SEAT León WTCC	TC2T	2:34.963			
21	55	(Hungary) Norbert Nagy	Campos Racing	SEAT León WTCC	TC2T	2:35.013			

- **Bold** denotes Pole position for second race.

=== Race 1 ===
Pos.	No.	Name	Team	Car	C	Laps	Time/Retired	Grid	Points
1	1	(France) **Yvan Muller**	Citroën Total WTCC	Citroën C-Elysée WTCC	TC1	9	22:09.364	1	25
2	37	(Argentina) José María López	Citroën Total WTCC	Citroën C-Elysée WTCC	TC1	9	+3.689	3	18
3	9	(France) Sébastien Loeb	Citroën Total WTCC	Citroën C-Elysée WTCC	TC1	9	+4.318	2	15
4	10	(Italy) Gianni Morbidelli	ALL-INKL.COM Münnich Motorsport	Chevrolet RML Cruze TC1	TC1	9	+21.125	9	12
5	4	(Netherlands) Tom Coronel	ROAL Motorsport	Chevrolet RML Cruze TC1	TC1	9	+21.998	7	10
6	18	(Portugal) Tiago Monteiro	Castrol Honda World Touring Car Team	Honda Civic WTCC	TC1	9	+22.071	10	8
7	5	(Hungary) Norbert Michelisz	Zengő Motorsport	Honda Civic WTCC	TC1	9	+23.517	6	6
8	2	(Italy) Gabriele Tarquini	Castrol Honda World Touring Car Team	Honda Civic WTCC	TC1	9	+24.350	5	4
9	98	(Serbia) Dušan Borković	Campos Racing	Chevrolet RML Cruze TC1	TC1	9	+30.094	21	2
10	3	(United Kingdom) Tom Chilton	ROAL Motorsport	Chevrolet RML Cruze TC1	TC1	9	+30.940	11	1
11	33	(China) Ma Qing Hua	Citroën Total WTCC	Citroën C-Elysée WTCC	TC1	9	+31.821	13	
12	7	(France) Hugo Valente	Campos Racing	Chevrolet RML Cruze TC1	TC1	9	+39.719	4	
13	25	(Morocco) Mehdi Bennani	Proteam Racing	Honda Civic WTCC	TC1	9	+45.992	8	
14	14	(Russia) Mikhail Kozlovskiy	Lukoil Lada Sport	Lada Granta 1.6T	TC1	9	+47.654	14	
15	77	(Germany) René Münnich	ALL-INKL.COM Münnich Motorsport	Chevrolet RML Cruze TC1	TC1	9	+48.196	16	
16	12	(United Kingdom) Robert Huff	Lukoil Lada Sport	Lada Granta 1.6T	TC1	9	+57.311	12	
17	11	(United Kingdom) James Thompson	Lukoil Lada Sport	Lada Granta 1.6T	TC1	9	+1:09.895	15	
18	6	(Germany) Franz Engstler	Liqui Moly Team Engstler	BMW 320 TC	TC2T	9	+1:28.674	17	
19	27	(France) John Filippi	Campos Racing	SEAT León WTCC	TC2T	9	+1:42.573	19	
20	55	(Hungary) Norbert Nagy	Campos Racing	SEAT León WTCC	TC2T	9	1:43.196	20	
21	8	(Italy) Pasquale Di Sabatino	Liqui Moly Team Engstler	BMW 320 TC	TC2T	8	+1 Lap	18	

Bold denotes Fastest lap.

=== Race 2 ===
Pos.	No.	Name	Team	Car	C	Laps	Time/Retired	Grid	Points
1	37	(Argentina) **José María López**	Citroën Total WTCC	Citroën C-Elysée WTCC	TC1	9	22:16.645	8	25
2	1	(France) Yvan Muller	Citroën Total WTCC	Citroën C-Elysée WTCC	TC1	9	+3.097	10	18
3	4	(Netherlands) Tom Coronel	ROAL Motorsport	Chevrolet RML Cruze TC1	TC1	9	+8.409	3	15
4	18	(Portugal) Tiago Monteiro	Castrol Honda World Touring Car Team	Honda Civic WTCC	TC1	9	+8.912	5	12
5	9	(France) Sébastien Loeb	Citroën Total WTCC	Citroën C-Elysée WTCC	TC1	9	+9.060	9	10
6	10	(Italy) Gianni Morbidelli	ALL-INKL.COM Münnich Motorsport	Chevrolet RML Cruze TC1	TC1	9	+16.851	1	8
7	5	(Hungary) Norbert Michelisz	Zengő Motorsport	Honda Civic WTCC	TC1	9	+17.929	4	6
8	2	(Italy) Gabriele Tarquini	Castrol Honda World Touring Car Team	Honda Civic WTCC	TC1	9	+19.026	6	4
9	7	(France) Hugo Valente	Campos Racing	Chevrolet RML Cruze TC1	TC1	9	+20.500	7	2
10	3	(United Kingdom) Tom Chilton	ROAL Motorsport	Chevrolet RML Cruze TC1	TC1	9	+21.187	12	1
11	25	(Morocco) Mehdi Bennani	Proteam Racing	Honda Civic WTCC	TC1	9	+22.296	2	
12	14	(Russia) Mikhail Kozlovskiy	Lukoil Lada Sport	Lada Granta 1.6T	TC1	9	+34.995	15	
13	12	(United Kingdom) Robert Huff	Lukoil Lada Sport	Lada Granta 1.6T	TC1	9	+38.692	13	
14	77	(Germany) René Münnich	ALL-INKL.COM Münnich Motorsport	Chevrolet RML Cruze TC1	TC1	9	+39.557	17	
15	11	(United Kingdom) James Thompson	Lukoil Lada Sport	Lada Granta 1.6T	TC1	9	+50.893	16	
16	6	(Germany) Franz Engstler	Liqui Moly Team Engstler	BMW 320 TC	TC2T	9	+1:17.281	18	
17	8	(Italy) Pasquale Di Sabatino	Liqui Moly Team Engstler	BMW 320 TC	TC2T	9	+1:23.029	19	
18	55	(Hungary) Norbert Nagy	Campos Racing	SEAT León WTCC	TC2T	9	1:33.065	21	
19	27	(France) John Filippi	Campos Racing	SEAT León WTCC	TC2T	8	+1 Lap	20	
Ret	98	(Serbia) Dušan Borković	Campos Racing	Chevrolet RML Cruze TC1	TC1	5	Mechanical	11	
Ret	33	(China) Ma Qing Hua	Citroën Total WTCC	Citroën C-Elysée WTCC	TC1	4	Mechanical	14	

Bold denotes Fastest lap.

== Standings after the event ==
Drivers' Championship standings

Pos	Driver	Points
1	(Argentina) José María López	255
2	(France) Yvan Muller	216
3	(France) Sébastien Loeb	190
4	(Portugal) Tiago Monteiro	125
5	(Italy) Gabriele Tarquini	105

Yokohama Trophy standings

	Pos	Driver	Points
	1	(Germany) Franz Engstler	144
	2	(Italy) Pasquale Di Sabatino	98
	3	(France) John Filippi	77
	4	(Hungary) Norbert Nagy	12
1	5	(Czech Republic) Petr Fulín	10

Manufacturers' Championship standings

Pos	Manufacturer	Points
1	(France) Citroën	597
2	(Japan) Honda	392
3	(Russia) Lada	202

- Note: Only the top five positions are included for both sets of drivers' standings.
