= 2015 FIA WTCC Race of Germany =

Race details
- Round 4 of 12 in the 2015 World Touring Car Championship at Nürburgring in Nürburg, Germany.
- Date: 16 May, 2015
- Location: Nürburg, Germany
- Course: Nürburgring; 25.378 kilometres (15.769 mi)

Race One
- Laps: 3
Pole position
Driver		(Argentina) José María López	Citroën Total WTCC
Time		8:37.327	
Podium
First		(Argentina) José María López	Citroën Total WTCC
Second		(France) Sébastien Loeb	Citroën Total WTCC
Third		(France) Yvan Muller	Citroën Total WTCC
Fastest Lap
Driver		(Argentina) José María López	Citroën Total WTCC
Time		8:40.688	

Race Two
- Laps: 3
Podium
First		(France) Yvan Muller	Citroën Total WTCC
Second		(Argentina) José María López	Citroën Total WTCC
Third		(Portugal) Tiago Monteiro	Honda Racing Team
Fastest Lap
Driver		(France) Yvan Muller	Citroën Total WTCC
Time		8:37.384	

The 2015 FIA WTCC Race of Germany was the fourth round of the 2015 World Touring Car Championship season and the eighth running of the FIA WTCC Race of Germany. It was held on 16 May 2015 at the Nürburgring Nordschleife (24-hour combined layout) in Nürburg, Germany. It was the first time the event had been held since 2011 and the first time the race had been held at the Nordschleife, having previously only been had at Oschersleben.

Both races were won by Citroën Total WTCC with José María López winning race one and Yvan Muller winning race two.

== Background ==
After three rounds López led the drivers' championship by 33 points over teammate Sébastien Loeb. Norbert Michelisz led the Yokohama Trophy.

Jaap van Lagen replaced James Thompson at Lada Sport Rosneft as the British driver recovered from surgery. A test at the Hungaroring following the Race of Hungary saw one chassis damaged and the team was reduced to running two cars; Mikhail Kozlovskiy was sidelined for the German round. Nika International and driver Rickard Rydell missed their third race weekend in a row as Rydell continued his recovery from thyroiditis. Sabine Schmitz joined ALL–INKL.COM Münnich Motorsport to race a Chevrolet Cruze for her home race.

There were no revisions to the compensation weights after Hungary; the Citroën C-Elysée WTCCs retained maximum ballast to weigh 1,160 kilograms (2,557 lb). The Honda Civic WTCCs, Chevrolet RML Cruze TC1s and Lada Vesta WTCCs remained at the base weight of 1,100 kilograms (2,425 lb).

Tom Coronel and John Filippi upgraded to the latest RML engine in their Chevrolet Cruzes and would be sent to the back of the grid for race one. Mehdi Bennani also received a new engine in his Citroën C-Elysée after the old unit overheated in Hungary.

== Report ==
=== Testing and free practice ===
López led Loeb and Muller in the test session on Thursday. López stopped on track in the middle of the session with technical problems before being able to restart and continue while Schmitz set the slowest time. She suffered a vibration problem and it limited her running time on the circuit.

Van Lagen and Robert Huff finished 1–2 for Lada in the first free practice session on Friday which took place in wet and foggy conditions, Tom Chilton was third and Tiago Monteiro fourth. Loeb in ninth was the highest placed Citroën driver. Both Ma Qing Hua and Mehdi Bennani had minor offs during the session.

The second free practice was dry and López set the pace ahead of Hugo Valente. Schmitz damaged her front–left corner and the subsequent repairs limited her running time and she posted the 16th fastest lap.

=== Qualifying ===
The usual three-part qualifying was replaced by a single one-hour session owing to the length of the circuit. López was the first driver to set a lap time, Michelisz put in two flying laps and went second. Valente then went second, only for Michelisz to take the place briefly before Valente was back ahead. The yellow flags came out when Ma crashed into the barriers between Flugplatz and Adenauer which foiled any attempts by other drivers to topple López who took pole. Monteiro finished tenth and took pole for race two with Coronel lining up alongside him. Both Ladas of Huff and van Lagen suffered electrical problems during the session with van Lagen lining up last for both races.

After qualifying, Lada Sport changed the engines in both of their cars and they would start at the back of the grid for race one.

=== Warm–up ===
Tom Chilton set the fastest in time in morning warm-up, pole sitter López was tenth and neither Lada set a lap time as the team remedied their electrical problems.

=== Race One ===
The GP-Strecke was used to complete the warm up lap before the race got underway, Valente got a slow start and jinked to the right defend from Michelisz and the two made contact. Loeb coming from third place was running alongside Michelisz into the first corner and Loeb took second. Behind them Ma, Muller, Monteiro, Gabriele Tarquini and Valente all got very close together into the second corner resulting in some pushing and shoving while at the back Coronel and Grégoire Demoustier made contact leaving Coronel with damage. López led Loeb and Muller as they completed the grand prix section, further behind Valente went up the inside of Schmitz to take tenth place; Chilton followed him before Valente moved over and tapped the front right corner of Chilton's car. Coronel headed straight to the pits after his contact at the start and retired and he was joined there by Huff. Van Lagen was on the tail of Demoustier and after a struggle trying to make a move on the Frenchman he made a pass just before the Carousel. Valente was able to get a slipstream behind Monteiro and take seventh place before the places were reversed at the Dunlop Curve. Moments later Valente took too much kerb on the inside of the Schumacher S and spun off into the barriers. It was starting to rain out on the Nordschleife on the second lap but this didn't deter van Lagen from taking another place from Filippi. His next target was Schmitz and after a few corners the two were nose to tail as Schmitz struggled with rear grip in her Chevrolet. At the end of the second lap Schmitz was still in front of van Lagen as Monteiro headed into the pits with the front left puncture. López led Loeb and Muller across the line with Michelisz fourth. Ma passed Tarquini just before the end to take fifth, after them Bennani, Stefano D'Aste and Chilton crossed the line while Schmitz held off van Lagen for tenth to take a point on her WTCC debut.

=== Race Two ===
Chilton was unable to start race two due to a damaged radiator resulting from the contact with Valente in race one. Valente was also unable to start the race as a result of his crash on the second lap of the first race. At the start of the race Tarquini got into the second corner ahead of Coronel to take second place before Muller took the position himself. At the end of the grand prix loop Huff tried going up the inside of Loeb for eighth which resulted in mild contact, further back Michelisz limped back to the pits with broken suspension. The top three of Monteiro, Muller and Tarquini were breaking away from the rest of the field and running in close formation. Muller used the slipstream at Döttinger Höhe to pass Monteiro and take the lead while Bennani and Ma moved up to fourth and fifth at the expense of Coronel. On lap two D'Aste had sustained damage to his front bumper which left it partially hanging off and dragging along the ground while up ahead both Loeb and López had also passed Coronel. Ma lost the back end of his Citroën at Schwedenkreuz and cut across the grass but recovered without losing places, later on in the lap at Döttinger Höhe he moved up to fourth after slipstreaming Bennani. At the start of the third lap all the cars in second to sixth place were running close together and López followed Ma in passing Bennani to take fifth. Having held a comfortable lead early on in the lap, Monteiro had reeled in Muller and the two were contesting the lead of the race once again. Ma was still having trouble with rear grip and he lost control and hit the barriers before coming across the track in front of López and hitting the inside barrier near Flugplatz. López joined the lead battle which had split into two groups between Muller and Monteiro and Tarquini and López; López passed both Tarquini and Monteiro on the back straight. Muller claimed a narrow victory over López with Monteiro and Tarquini finishing third and fourth.

== Standings after the event ==
Drivers' Championship standings

Pos	Driver	Points
1	(Argentina) José María López	177
2	(France) Sébastien Loeb	127
3	(France) Yvan Muller	126
4	(Portugal) Tiago Monteiro	73
5	(China) Ma Qing Hua	64

Yokohama Trophy standings

	Pos	Driver	Points
	1	(Hungary) Norbert Michelisz	57
1	2	(Morocco) Mehdi Bennani	54
1	3	(United Kingdom) Tom Chilton	48
1	4	(Italy) Stefano D'Aste	30
1	5	(France) John Filippi	29

Manufacturers' Championship standings

Pos	Manufacturer	Points
1	(France) Citroën	364
2	(Japan) Honda	249
3	(Russia) Lada	73

- Note: Only the top five positions are included for both sets of drivers' standings.
