= Citroën World Touring Car Team =

(France) Citroën World Touring Car Team
- Founded: 2013
- Folded: 2017
- Team principal(s): Yves Matton
- Current series: World Touring Car Championship
- Noted drivers: (France) Yvan Muller (France) Sébastien Loeb (China) Ma Qing Hua (Argentina) José María López
- Teams' Championships: 2014, 2015, 2016
- Drivers' Championships: 2014, 2015, 2016 (López)
- Website: http://www.citroenracing.com/en

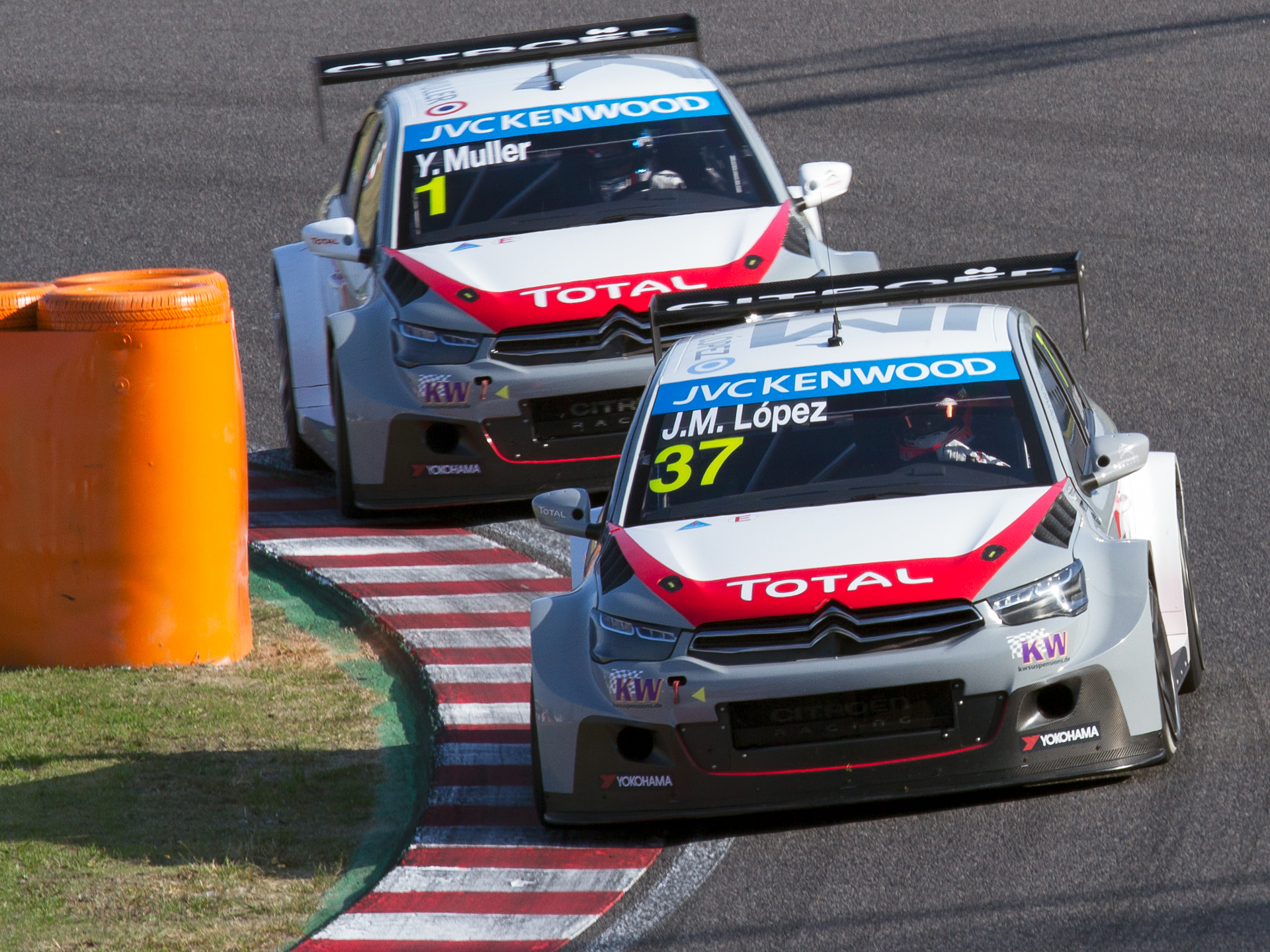
Citroën's drivers got a 1-2-3 positions at the 2014 WTCC drivers championship, with 17 wins out of 23 races (74% of victories).

The Citroën World Touring Car Team was the Citroën factory touring car arm of Citroën Racing, which competed in the World Touring Car Championship.

== Formation ==
In 2013, Citroën Racing created a new sub-division, the Citroën World Touring Car Team, in order to begin to run in addition in the 2014 World Touring Car Championship. The Citroën World Touring Car Team was formed in June, 2013, when it was announced that the team will enter WTCC in 2014. 9-time World Rally Champion Sébastien Loeb joined the team instantly and several weeks later the 3-time WTCC champion at the time Yvan Muller joined as Loeb's teammate. Also it was announced that the car that will be used will be Citroën C-Elysée, built to the brand new TC1 regulations. Loeb and Muller carried out the initial tests of the TC1 prototype of the C-Elysée. Shortly after the end of the 2013 season they were joined by José María López, who was signed to drive the third full-time car of the team. In February, 2014 the team signed Ma Qing Hua to drive the fourth car at selected races.

== Results and statistics ==
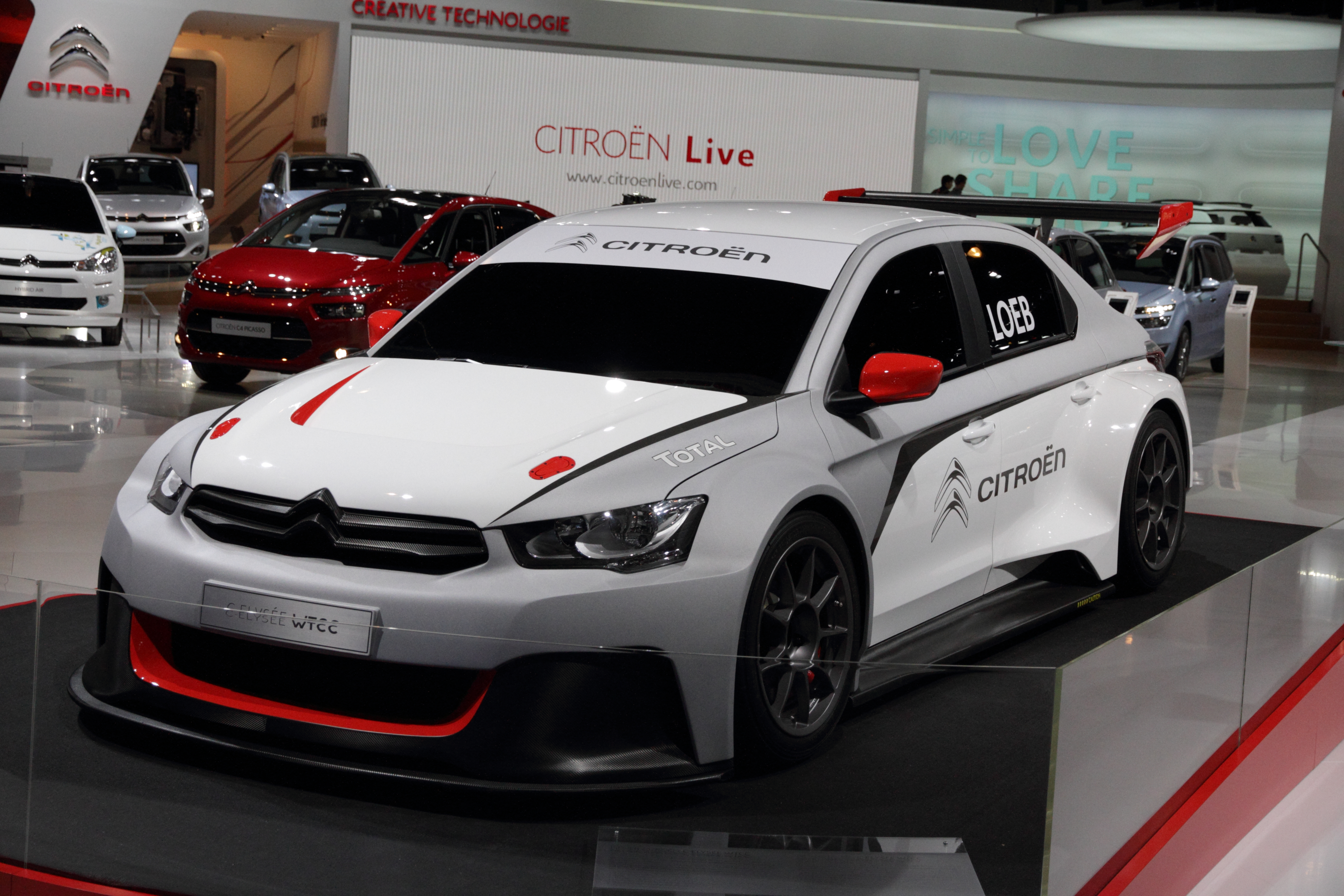
Citroën-Total C-Elysée WTCC 2014 showed in Frankfurt in September 2013.

=== 2014 ===
In 2014, Citroën won seventeen races out of twenty three, in spite of the inversion of the qualifications grid for the race two and in spite of the 60 kg compensation weight that the Citroën C-Elysée had to carry, as the most competitive car of the championship.

The Citroën World Touring Car Team won fourteen victories out of the first fifteen races of the 2014 WTCC season. The Citroën/Total WTCC Team won the Manufacturer's WTCC Championship, 5 races before the end of the season, after the 2014 Shanghai first race, where Citroën recorded a magnificent one-two-three-four. The Citroën World Touring Car Team pilots also got the three first ranks of the Drivers' World Touring Car Championship.

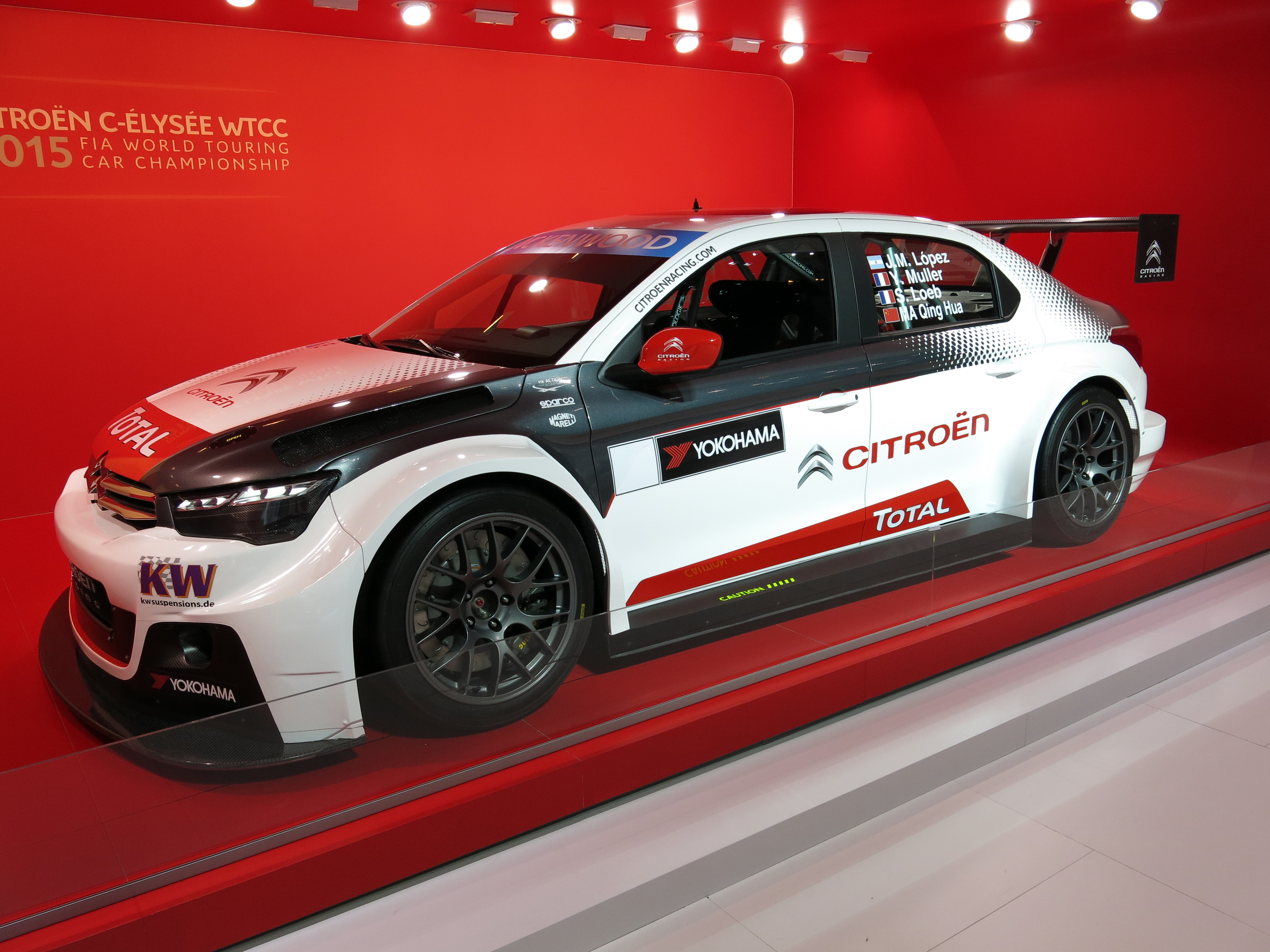
Citroën-Total C-Elysée WTCC 2014 showed in Geneva in March 2015.

=== 2015 ===
The pilots of the Citroën-Total WTCC team were Sébastien Loeb, José María López, Yvan Muller and Ma Qing Hua, for the full season in 2015. Citroën dominated this season in the same way it did the previous year with José María López again winning 10 races and the Drivers' Championship. Teammates Yvan Muller and Sébastien Loeb finished second and third respectively, just like they did in 2014. Citroën again won the Manufacturer's Championship.

Citroën also provided a racecar for the Sébastien Loeb Racing Team and its driver : Mehdi Bennani.

=== 2016 ===
Citroën announced their decision to leave the WTCC after the 2016 season, during which they fielded just two cars for José María López and Yvan Muller.

=== Complete World Touring Car Championship results ===
(key) (Races in bold indicate pole position) (Races in italics indicate fastest lap)

Year	Entrant	No.	Driver	1	2	3	4	5	6	7	8	9	10	11	12	13	14	15	16	17	18	19	20	21	22	23	24	DC	Points	MC	Points
2014	Citroën Total WTCC	1	(France) **Yvan Muller**	MAR; 1; 3	MAR; 2 Ret	**FRA**; **1**; 1	FRA; 2; 2	**HUN**; **1**; 1	HUN; 2; 5	SVK; 1; 10	SVK; 2 C	**AUT**; **1**; 1	AUT; 2 Ret	RUS; 1; 4	RUS; 2; 2	**BEL**; **1**; 1	BEL; 2; 2	ARG; 1; 3	ARG; 2; 3	BEI; 1; 2	BEI; 2; 9	CHN; 1; 3	CHN; 2 Ret	JPN; 1 Ret	JPN; 2; 5	MAC; 1; 5	MAC; 2; 2	**2nd**	**336**	1st	1003
2014	Citroën Total WTCC	9	(France) **Sébastien Loeb**	MAR; 1; 2	MAR; 2; 1	FRA; 1; 2	FRA; 2; 6	HUN; 1; 7	HUN; 2; 9	SVK; 1; 1	SVK; 2 C	AUT; 1; 4	AUT; 2; 7	RUS; 1; 3	RUS; 2; 5	BEL; 1; 3	BEL; 2; 5	ARG; 1; 4	ARG; 2; 6	BEI; 1; 5	BEI; 2; 3	CHN; 1; 4	CHN; 2; 12	JPN; 1; 3	JPN; 2; 7	MAC; 1; 6	MAC; 2; 6	**3rd**	**295**	1st	1003
2014	Citroën Total WTCC	33	(China) **Ma Qing Hua**	MAR; 1	MAR; 2	FRA; 1	FRA; 2	HUN; 1	HUN; 2	SVK; 1	SVK; 2	AUT; 1	AUT; 2	RUS; 1; 6	RUS; 2; 1	BEL; 1; 11	BEL; 2 Ret	ARG; 1	ARG; 2	BEI; 1; 15†	BEI; 2; 12	CHN; 1; 2	CHN; 2; 5	JPN; 1	JPN; 2	MAC; 1; 8	MAC; 2 Ret	13th	69	1st	1003
2014	Citroën Total WTCC	37	(Argentina) **José María López**	**MAR**; **1**; 1	MAR; 2; 2	FRA; 1; 4	FRA; 2; 1	HUN; 1; 2	HUN; 2; 6	**SVK**; **1**; 2	SVK; 2 C	AUT; 1; 3	AUT; 2; 1	**RUS**; **1**; 1	RUS; 2 Ret	BEL; 1; 2	BEL; 2; 1	**ARG**; **1**; 1	ARG; 2; 1	BEI; 1; 3	BEI; 2; 4	**CHN**; **1**; 1	CHN; 2; 3	**JPN**; **1**; 1	JPN; 2; 6	**MAC**; **1**; 1	MAC; 2; 5	**1st**	**462**	1st	1003
2015	Citroën Total WTCC	9	(France) **Sébastien Loeb**	ARG; 1; 3	ARG; 2; 1	MAR; 1; 3	MAR; 2; 2	HUN; 1; 6	HUN; 2; 5	GER; 1; 2	GER; 2; 5	RUS; 1; 9	RUS; 2; 7	SVK; 1; 3	SVK; 2; 1	**FRA**; **1**; 1	FRA; 2 Ret	POR; 1; 2	POR; 2; 15†	JPN; 1; 6	JPN; 2; 4	CHN; 1; 3	CHN; 2; 4	THA; 1; 2	THA; 2; 1	QAT; 1; 4	QAT; 2; 4	3rd	356	1st	1069
2015	Citroën Total WTCC	33	(China) **Ma Qing Hua**	ARG; 1; 7	ARG; 2; 6	MAR; 1; 2	MAR; 2; 10	HUN; 1; 4	HUN; 2; 9	GER; 1; 5	GER; 2 Ret	RUS; 1; 5	RUS; 2; 5	SVK; 1 Ret	SVK; 2 Ret	FRA; 1; 4	FRA; 2; 3	POR; 1; 6	**POR**; **2**; 1	JPN; 1; 4	JPN; 2; 5	CHN; 1; 10†	CHN; 2; 8	THA; 1; 3	THA; 2; 2	QAT; 1; 5	QAT; 2; 2	4th	241	1st	1069
2015	Citroën Total WTCC	37	(Argentina) **José María López**	**ARG**; **1**; 1	ARG; 2; 2	**MAR**; **1**; 1	MAR; 2; 3	HUN; 1; 1	HUN; 2; 6	**GER**; **1**; 1	GER; 2; 2	RUS; 1; 2	RUS; 2; 12	SVK; 1; 2	SVK; 2; 2	FRA; 1; 3	FRA; 2; 1	**POR**; **1**; 1	POR; 2; 5	JPN; 1; 1	JPN; 2 Ret	**CHN**; **1**; 1	CHN; 2; 3	**THA**; **1**; 1	THA; 2; 3	**QAT**; **1**; 1	QAT; 2; 8	1st	475	1st	1069
2015	Citroën Total WTCC	68	(France) **Yvan Muller**	ARG; 1; 2	ARG; 2; 11	MAR; 1; 5	**MAR**; **2**; 1	**HUN**; **1**; 2	HUN; 2; 7	GER; 1; 3	GER; 2; 1	**RUS**; **1**; 1	RUS; 2; 6	**SVK**; **1**; 1	SVK; 2; 3	FRA; 1; 2	FRA; 2; 4	POR; 1; 7	POR; 2; 2	JPN; 1; 5	JPN; 2; 15†	CHN; 1; 2	CHN; 2; 1	THA; 1 Ret	THA; 2 Ret	QAT; 1; 6	QAT; 2; 1	2nd	357	1st	1069
2015	Sébastien Loeb Racing	25	(Morocco) **Mehdi Bennani**	ARG; 1; 13	ARG; 2; 5	MAR; 1; 4	MAR; 2; 12	HUN; 1; 11	HUN; 2 Ret	GER; 1; 7	GER; 2; 6	RUS; 1; 14	RUS; 2 Ret	SVK; 1 Ret	SVK; 2; 7	FRA; 1; 9	**FRA**; **2**; 9	POR; 1; 11	POR; 2; 10	JPN; 1; 7	JPN; 2; 10	CHN; 1; 5	CHN; 2; 7	THA; 1; 4	THA; 2; 7	QAT; 1; 2	QAT; 2; 5	8th	127	1st	1069
2016	Citroën Total WTCC	37	(Argentina) **José María López**	FRA; 1; 6	**FRA**; **2**; 1	SVK; 1; 5	SVK; 2; 1	HUN; 1; 13	**HUN**; **2**; 1	MAR; 1; 2	MAR; 2; 1	GER; 1; 1	**GER**; **2**; 1	RUS; 1; 5	RUS; 2; 8	POR; 1; 5	POR; 2; 5	ARG; 1; 5	**ARG**; **2**; 1	JPN; 1; 4	**JPN**; **2**; 2	CHN; 1; 4	**CHN**; **2**; 1	QAT; 1; 9	QAT; 2; 3			1st	381	1st	957
2016	Citroën Total WTCC	68	(France) **Yvan Muller**	FRA; 1; 13	FRA; 2; 4	SVK; 1; 7	**SVK**; **2**; 5	HUN; 1; 12	HUN; 2; 2	MAR; 1; 3	MAR; 2; 2	GER; 1 Ret	GER; 2 DNS	RUS; 1; 3	RUS; 2; 11	POR; 1; 9	POR; 2; 2	ARG; 1; 3	ARG; 2; 5	JPN; 1; 5	JPN; 2; 1	CHN; 1; 3	CHN; 2; 2	QAT; 1; 4	QAT; 2; 6			2nd	257	1st	957

== See also ==
- Citroën World Rally Team
