= 2015 FIA WTCC Race of Morocco =

Motor race in Marrakech

Race details
- Round 2 of 12 in the 2015 World Touring Car Championship at Circuit International Automobile Moulay El Hassan in Marrakech, Morocco.
- Date: 19 April, 2015
- Location: Marrakech, Morocco
- Course: Circuit International Automobile Moulay El Hassan; 4.545 kilometres (2.824 mi)

Race One
- Laps: 14
Pole position
Driver		(Argentina) José María López	Citroën Total WTCC
Time		1:43.854	
Podium
First		(Argentina) José María López	Citroën Total WTCC
Second		(China) Ma Qing Hua	Citroën Total WTCC
Third		(France) Sébastien Loeb	Citroën Total WTCC
Fastest Lap
Driver		(Argentina) José María López	Citroën Total WTCC
Time		1:43.847	

Race Two
- Laps: 14
Podium
First		(France) Yvan Muller	Citroën Total WTCC
Second		(France) Sébastien Loeb	Citroën Total WTCC
Third		(Argentina) José María López	Citroën Total WTCC
Fastest Lap
Driver		(Argentina) José María López	Citroën Total WTCC
Time		1:43.480	

The 2015 FIA WTCC Race of Morocco (formally the 2015 Eurodatacar Race of Morocco) was the second round of the 2015 World Touring Car Championship season and the sixth running of the FIA WTCC Race of Morocco. It was held on 19 April 2015 at the Circuit International Automobile Moulay El Hassan in Marrakech, Morocco.

Both races were won by Citroën Total WTCC, José María López won race one and Yvan Muller won race two. Both drivers achieved their second win at the circuit, setting a new record.

== Background ==
After the first round López led the drivers' championship by five points over teammate Sébastien Loeb. Norbert Michelisz led the Yokohama Trophy standings by three points over local driver Mehdi Bennani.

Lada Sport Rosneft expanded to three cars as Mikhail Kozlovskiy started his season following the late build of his car. Rickard Rydell and Nika International missed the round after Rydell was taken ill in the week before.

Yvan Muller took a five-place grid drop for race one after a collision with Bennani at the previous round. John Filippi also lost five places on the grid for race one after a collision with James Thompson in Argentina. Grégoire Demoustier dropped to the back of the grid for race one after blowing an engine in testing prior to the event. Thompson and teammate Robert Huff both moved to the back of the grid for engine changes after the last round. RML Group released an engine update to their customer teams, ROAL Motorsport's Tom Chilton and Campos Racing's Hugo Valente both took this upgrade and dropped to the back of the grid for race one.

== Report ==
=== Testing and free practice ===
López was quickest in the test session on Friday as Citroën filled the top three positions with Muller second and privateer Bennani third.

It was a Citroën 1–2–3–4 in free practice one with López leading Loeb, Bennani and Muller.

López stayed on top in free practice two as Citroën cars filled the top four places once again. The session came to a premature end when Huff crashed his Lada Vesta WTCC into the tyre barriers just before the completion of the half-hour session.

=== Qualifying ===
Ma Qing Hua was the quickest driver in the first part of qualifying. None of the Ladas made it through to the second session with Huff in thirteenth their best placed driver.

López was quickest in the second session with Valente second. Ma and Bennani also made it through to the third session along with Chilton. Tom Coronel had slowed in the final moments of the session after his air jack accidentally deployed which briefly brought out the yellow flags and shook up the order slightly. Norbert Michelisz was the best placed Honda driver, narrowly missing out on a Q3 place by four hundredths of a second. Muller ended up tenth to provisionally take pole for race two.

Chilton elected not to go out for the Q3 Superpole session due to a gearbox problem and his impending grid penalty. Bennani was therefore the first car to go out followed by Ma. Valente went out third but braked too late for the first corner and crashed into the tyre wall. López was the last driver to go out and he went to the top of the times with his last lap, to take pole position.

After qualifying, Michelisz's Honda was found to be underweight and was dropped three places on the grid.

=== Race One ===
Hours before the start of the first race, Dušan Borković announced he was withdrawing from the rest of the weekend having struggled to fit inside the Honda Civic WTCC and due to the lower specification of the Proteam Racing car compared to the other Hondas.

López and Ma went side by side into the first corner and Loeb jumped into third ahead of Bennani and Valente stalled on the grid. Chilton ran into the side of Coronel halfway round the lap and broke his right front suspension and he limped back to the pits for repairs. Chilton was in a battle with the Ladas of Thompson and Huff and he was able to out-brake Thompson into one of the circuit's many chicanes to take tenth place. Many of the cars were struggling to overtake with Muller pressuring Tiago Monteiro for fifth and further ahead Bennani chasing Loeb for third. Muller tried to go round the outside of Monteiro at the final hairpin on lap eight but could not make the move stick and caught the rear of his car on the front bumper of Gabriele Tarquini as he cut back in. A few corners later he was able to make a successful pass down the inside of Monteiro while up ahead Bennani was up the inside of Loeb but missed the corner and gained an unfair advantage; Bennani gave the place back to Loeb on the following lap. By lap ten Muller was now distancing himself from Monteiro but he was still a long way off Loeb and Bennani who had themselves lost ground on Lopez and Ma. Demoustier retired in the pit lane with brake issues in his Craft-Bamboo Racing Chevrolet. Bennani tried to pass Loeb again on lap thirteen but out-braked himself and ran straight on, losing ground on Loeb in the process. López led a Citroën 1–2–3 and became the first driver to have two wins at the circuit. Bennani finished fourth, taking the Yokohama Trophy honours.

After the race, Chilton had 30 seconds added to his race time in lieu of a drive-through penalty, dropping him from tenth to fourteenth in the final classification.

=== Race Two ===
Muller led the field away with Loeb second and Coronel third before Monteiro went around the outside to take third place. Michelisz then tapped Coronel from behind who in turn ran into Monteiro sending both drivers into the barriers at the first corner. Monteiro was able to limp back to the pits while Coronel's car was retired on the spot. Kozlovskiy out-braked himself at the final corner of lap one, clipped the front of Tarquini's car and careering into the back of teammate Huff which brought out the yellow flags in the final sector. The yellow flags in two of the three sectors helped Valente who was defending fourth place from López who had already made up five places from his starting position on the opening lap. López was able to pass Valente at the end of lap four with third placed Chilton his next target. At the end of lap five López went around the outside of Chilton at the final corner and his superior straight line speed meant he was third across the line. Muller and Loeb had opened up a big lead from the cars behind and were in a close battle of their own for the lead of the race. Bennani went up the inside of Valente at turn four on lap seven to try and take fifth from Valente who then turned into the back of the Citroën and spun Bennani into the barriers. The following lap saw Ma lock up and slide into the tyre barrier at turns four and five. Valente and Bennani collided at turn four again on lap thirteen. Bennani once again went up the inside before Valente turned in; this time both cars spun off. Bennani was struggling with his brakes and on the last lap Michelisz, Stefano D'Aste and Tarquini were all able to pass the Citroën; Tarquini making an opportunistic move at the final corner to take seventh off D'Aste. Muller led a Citroën 1–2–3 as Loeb and López completed the podium. Chilton was fourth and the Yokohama Trophy winner, Bennani ended up ninth and Thompson in the last running Lada was tenth.

Michelisz was given a 30-second penalty for causing the start crash with Monteiro and Coronel while both Bennani and Valente were given the same penalty for their collisions.

== Results ==
=== Qualifying ===
Pos.	No.	Name	Team	Car	C	Q1	Q2	Q3	Points
1	37	(Argentina) José María López	Citroën Total WTCC	Citroën C-Elysée WTCC		1:43.845	1:43.393	1:43.854	**5**
2	25	(Morocco) Mehdi Bennani	Sébastien Loeb Racing	Citroën C-Elysée WTCC	Y	1:44.648	1:43.987	1:44.109	**4**
3	33	(China) Ma Qing Hua	Citroën Total WTCC	Citroën C-Elysée WTCC		1:43.652	1:43.971	1:44.582	**3**
4	7	(France) Hugo Valente	Campos Racing	Chevrolet RML Cruze TC1	Y	1:44.378	1:43.882	no time set	**2**
5	3	(United Kingdom) Tom Chilton	ROAL Motorsport	Chevrolet RML Cruze TC1	Y	1:44.559	1:44.062	no time set	**1**
6	5	(Hungary) Norbert Michelisz	Zengő Motorsport	Honda Civic WTCC	Y	1:44.472	1:44.102		
7	18	(Portugal) Tiago Monteiro	Honda Racing Team JAS	Honda Civic WTCC		1:44.250	1:44.118		
8	9	(France) Sébastien Loeb	Citroën Total WTCC	Citroën C-Elysée WTCC		1:44.185	1:44.150		
9	4	(Netherlands) Tom Coronel	ROAL Motorsport	Chevrolet RML Cruze TC1	Y	1:44.539	1:44.177		
10	68	(France) **Yvan Muller**	Citroën Total WTCC	Citroën C-Elysée WTCC		1:43.844	1:44.185		
11	2	(Italy) Gabriele Tarquini	Honda Racing Team JAS	Honda Civic WTCC		1:44.339	1:44.313		
12	26	(Italy) Stefano D'Aste	ALL-INKL.COM Münnich Motorsport	Chevrolet RML Cruze TC1	Y	1:44.716	1:44.573		
13	12	(United Kingdom) Robert Huff	Lada Sport Rosneft	Lada Vesta WTCC		1:44.834			
14	98	(Serbia) Dušan Borković	Proteam Racing	Honda Civic WTCC	Y	1:45.087			
15	27	(France) John Filippi	Campos Racing	Chevrolet RML Cruze TC1	Y	1:45.773			
16	15	(United Kingdom) James Thompson	Lada Sport Rosneft	Lada Vesta WTCC		1:46.113			
17	11	(France) Grégoire Demoustier	Craft-Bamboo Racing	Chevrolet RML Cruze TC1	Y	1:46.261			
18	14	(Russia) Mikhail Kozlovskiy	Lada Sport Rosneft	Lada Vesta WTCC		1:46.407			

- **Bold** denotes Pole position for second race.

== Standings after the event ==
Drivers' Championship standings

	Pos	Driver	Points
	1	(Argentina) José María López	93
	2	(France) Sébastien Loeb	76
1	3	(France) Yvan Muller	57
2	4	(China) Ma Qing Hua	38
	5	(Italy) Gabriele Tarquini	38

Yokohama Trophy standings

	Pos	Driver	Points
2	1	(Morocco) Mehdi Bennani	31
1	2	(Hungary) Norbert Michelisz	30
1	3	(United Kingdom) Tom Chilton	29
1	4	(Italy) Stefano D'Aste	20
2	5	(France) John Filippi	15

Manufacturers' Championship standings

Pos	Manufacturer	Points
1	(France) Citroën	190
2	(Japan) Honda	116
3	(Russia) Lada	32

- Note: Only the top five positions are included for both sets of drivers' standings.
