= 2015 FIA WTCC Race of Argentina =

Race details
- Round 1 of 12 in the 2015 World Touring Car Championship at Autódromo Termas de Río Hondo in Termas de Río Hondo, Argentina.
- Date: 8 March, 2015
- Location: Termas de Río Hondo, Argentina
- Course: Autódromo Termas de Río Hondo; 4.805 kilometres (2.986 mi)

Race One
- Laps: 13
Pole position
Driver		(Argentina) José María López	Citroën Total WTCC
Time		1:45.461	
Podium
First		(Argentina) José María López	Citroën Total WTCC
Second		(France) Yvan Muller	Citroën Total WTCC
Third		(France) Sébastien Loeb	Citroën Total WTCC
Fastest Lap
Driver		(Argentina) José María López	Citroën Total WTCC
Time		1:47.702	

Race Two
- Laps: 15
Podium
First		(France) Sébastien Loeb	Citroën Total WTCC
Second		(Argentina) José María López	Citroën Total WTCC
Third		(Portugal) Tiago Monteiro	Honda Racing JAS
Fastest Lap
Driver		(France) Sébastien Loeb	Citroën Total WTCC
Time		1:46.708	

The 2015 FIA WTCC Race of Argentina was the opening round of the 2015 World Touring Car Championship season and the third running of the FIA WTCC Race of Argentina. It was held on 8 March 2015 at the Autódromo Termas de Río Hondo in Termas de Río Hondo, Santiago del Estero Province, Argentina.

Both races were won by Citroën Total WTCC with race one won by José María López and race two won by Sébastien Loeb.

== Background ==
A total of eighteen cars were entered for the first round of the season, all built to the TC1 regulations introduced the previous year. With this the Yokohama Trophy rules were changed to reward the best placed driver from an independent team. Unlike previous seasons, certain drivers were not eliminated from this trophy based on previous career accomplishments.

== Report ==
=== Testing and free practice ===
Sébastien Loeb set the pace in testing on Friday in damp conditions. Mehdi Bennani was the fastest independent driver in fifth.

First free practice on Saturday morning saw reigning champion José María López set the fastest time. The session was interrupted by a red flag when Tom Chilton's ROAL Motorsport Chevrolet suffered a left–front puncture.

López topped the times once again in free practice two with Ma Qing Hua and Yvan Muller making it a Citroën 1–2–3. Hugo Valente suffered brake failure and damaged his engine by downshifting in an attempt to stop; the car subsequently caught fire.

=== Qualifying ===
Prior to the first session starting, it was confirmed that the Campos Racing car of Valente would miss qualifying following his practice shunt; the car required a substantial rebuild, due to the damage suffered.

In the first part of qualifying, Lada Sport Rosneft's Robert Huff was the quickest driver ahead of the privateer Citroën of Bennani. Norbert Michelisz lost his front-right wheel on his first attempt at a flying lap, suffering damage that put him out of the rest of the session and he would line up on the back row for both races.

Ma topped the times in the second part of qualifying and along with López, Muller, Tiago Monteiro and Sébastien Loeb would continue to the Q3 segment. James Thompson was tenth and would line up on pole for race two.

Q3 saw López claim pole position by 1.2 seconds over Muller with Loeb, Ma and Monteiro completing the top five.

=== Race One ===
Muller jumped ahead of López briefly at the start while Ma failed to get going off the line and Chilton dived around him. Muller ran out wide on the exit of turn one and López retook first place. Thompson and Campos' John Filippi were out on the first lap with broken suspension on both of their cars after making contact. On lap three Chilton was under attack from Bennani until the Moroccan driver slid and gave Huff a chance to move up to seventh place. Later on in the lap Bennani was attempting to pass Huff up the inside and collided with the rear of the Lada, breaking the right–rear suspension. On lap four Valente went off and crashed into the barriers which brought his race to an end. Bennani was held up by Chilton until lap six when the defensive driving of Chilton had reduced the grip his tyres, following Bennani through were Michelisz and the recovering Ma. Lap eight saw Bennani given a drive–through penalty for his earlier collision with Huff, moving Michelisz up to sixth and Rickard Rydell into the top ten. López won the race by 3.1 seconds from Muller with Loeb completing a Citroën 1–2–3, Michelisz was the winning Yokohama independent driver.

=== Race Two ===
After their collisions in the first race, neither Huff nor Valente made the start of the race. Thompson dropped down the order at the start as Tom Coronel moved into the lead from second, followed by the two factory Hondas and Stefano D'Aste who followed Gabriele Tarquini in running off the track onto the grass. By the end of the back straight Ma was up to third behind Monteiro and at the end of the lap both Ma and Loeb led Coronel. The second lap saw Loeb take the lead of the race after a mistake by Ma as López picked off Monteiro and closed in on the back of Coronel. Thompson pulled into the pits at the end of the first lap while Coronel went off the circuit dropping him further down the order and collecting grass in his radiator grill. The safety car came out on lap three due to spilt oil on the exit of turn two as the stranded car of D'Aste was towed off the circuit. During the safety car period Ma pitted due to overheating and to have his radiator cleaned out, dropping him to the back of the field. The race resumed on lap six and López used his straight line speed advantage to pick off Tarquini on the back straight and leaving Tarquini to deal with Muller behind. The start of lap seven saw Chilton take Dušan Borković for eighth with Rydell following him through, Borković then dropped a wheel off the track and ripped the front bumper of his Proteam Racing Honda off on the kerbing. Lap ten saw Muller run into the right–rear end of Bennani as both pursued Tarquini; Bennani dropped from fourth to seventh as a result. Muller continued to have problems when he drifted wide and lost a place to Monteiro, Muller went into the pits on lap twelve for repairs. Loeb comfortably beat López to win the race, Monteiro took the final podium place and Bennani in fifth was the Yokohama Trophy winner.

After the race, Muller was given a five–place grid drop for the next race in Morocco for causing the collision with Bennani. Michelisz was dropped a place in the results for a collision with Ma near the end of the race.

== Results ==
=== Qualifying ===
Pos.	No.	Name	Team	Car	C	Q1	Q2	Q3	Points
1	37	(Argentina) José María López	Citroën Total WTCC	Citroën C-Elysée WTCC		1:47.300	1:45.891	1:45.461	**5**
2	68	(France) Yvan Muller	Citroën Total WTCC	Citroën C-Elysée WTCC		1:47.445	1:46.149	1:46.701	**4**
3	9	(France) Sébastien Loeb	Citroën Total WTCC	Citroën C-Elysée WTCC		1:47.056	1:46.641	1:47.061	**3**
4	33	(China) Ma Qing Hua	Citroën Total WTCC	Citroën C-Elysée WTCC		1:47.326	1:45.808	1:47.203	**2**
5	18	(Portugal) Tiago Monteiro	Honda Racing Team JAS	Honda Civic WTCC		1:47.321	1:46.469	1:47.633	**1**
6	3	(United Kingdom) Tom Chilton	ROAL Motorsport	Chevrolet RML Cruze TC1	Y	1:47.511	1:46.738		
7	2	(Italy) Gabriele Tarquini	Honda Racing Team JAS	Honda Civic WTCC		1:47.441	1:46.967		
8	26	(Italy) Stefano D'Aste	ALL-INKL.COM Münnich Motorsport	Chevrolet RML Cruze TC1	Y	1:47.240	1:47.120		
9	4	(Netherlands) Tom Coronel	ROAL Motorsport	Chevrolet RML Cruze TC1	Y	1:48.038	1:48.322		
10	15	(United Kingdom) **James Thompson**	Lada Sport Rosneft	Lada Vesta WTCC		1:48.033	1:50.165		
11	12	(United Kingdom) Robert Huff	Lada Sport Rosneft	Lada Vesta WTCC		1:46.878	1:50.553		
12	25	(Morocco) Mehdi Bennani	Sébastien Loeb Racing	Citroën C-Elysée WTCC	Y	1:47.040			
13	98	(Serbia) Dušan Borković	Proteam Racing	Honda Civic WTCC	Y	1:48.443			
14	27	(France) John Filippi	Campos Racing	Chevrolet RML Cruze TC1	Y	1:48.507			
15	11	(France) Grégoire Demoustier	Craft Bamboo	Chevrolet RML Cruze TC1	Y	1:49.042			
16	19	(Sweden) Rickard Rydell	Nika International	Honda Civic WTCC		1:49.267			
17	5	(Hungary) Norbert Michelisz	Zengő Motorsport	Honda Civic WTCC	Y	no time set			
18	7	(France) Hugo Valente	Campos Racing	Chevrolet RML Cruze TC1	Y	no time set			

- **Bold** denotes Pole position for second race.

=== Race 1 ===
Pos.	No.	Name	Team	Car	C	Laps	Time/Retired	Grid	Points
1	37	(Argentina) **José María López**	Citroën Total WTCC	Citroën C-Elysée WTCC		13	23:25.060	1	25
2	68	(France) Yvan Muller	Citroën Total WTCC	Citroën C-Elysée WTCC		13	+3.170	2	18
3	9	(France) Sébastien Loeb	Citroën Total WTCC	Citroën C-Elysée WTCC		13	+7.500	3	15
4	18	(Portugal) Tiago Monteiro	Honda Racing Team JAS	Honda Civic WTCC		13	+14.168	5	12
5	2	(Italy) Gabriele Tarquini	Honda Racing Team JAS	Honda Civic WTCC		13	+16.322	7	10
6	5	(Hungary) Norbert Michelisz	Zengő Motorsport	Honda Civic WTCC	Y	13	+18.470	17	8
7	33	(China) Ma Qing Hua	Citroën Total WTCC	Citroën C-Elysée WTCC		13	+20.164	4	6
8	3	(United Kingdom) Tom Chilton	ROAL Motorsport	Chevrolet RML Cruze TC1	Y	13	+23.499	6	4
9	26	(Italy) Stefano D'Aste	ALL-INKL.COM Münnich Motorsport	Chevrolet RML Cruze TC1	Y	13	+27.306	8	2
10	19	(Sweden) Rickard Rydell	Nika International	Honda Civic WTCC		13	+30.266	16	1
11	98	(Serbia) Dušan Borković	Proteam Racing	Honda Civic WTCC	Y	13	+34.387	13	
12	11	(France) Grégoire Demoustier	Craft Bamboo	Chevrolet RML Cruze TC1	Y	13	+36.213	15	
13	25	(Morocco) Mehdi Bennani	Sébastien Loeb Racing	Citroën C-Elysée WTCC	Y	13	+37.906	12	
14	4	(Netherlands) Tom Coronel	ROAL Motorsport	Chevrolet RML Cruze TC1	Y	9	+4 Laps	9	
Ret	7	(France) Hugo Valente	Campos Racing	Chevrolet RML Cruze TC1	Y	4	Race incident	18	
Ret	12	(United Kingdom) Robert Huff	Lada Sport Rosneft	Lada Vesta WTCC		4	Race incident	11	
NC	15	(United Kingdom) James Thompson	Lada Sport Rosneft	Lada Vesta WTCC		2	+11 Laps	10	
Ret	27	(France) John Filippi	Campos Racing	Chevrolet RML Cruze TC1	Y	1	Race incident	14	

Bold denotes Fastest lap.

=== Race 2 ===
Pos.	No.	Name	Team	Car	C	Laps	Time/Retired	Grid	Points
1	9	(France) **Sébastien Loeb**	Citroën Total WTCC	Citroën C-Elysée WTCC		15	29:33.508	8	25
2	37	(Argentina) José María López	Citroën Total WTCC	Citroën C-Elysée WTCC		15	+4.690	10	18
3	18	(Portugal) Tiago Monteiro	Honda Racing Team JAS	Honda Civic WTCC		15	+10.149	6	15
4	2	(Italy) Gabriele Tarquini	Honda Racing Team JAS	Honda Civic WTCC		15	+11.564	4	12
5	25	(Morocco) Mehdi Bennani	Sébastien Loeb Racing	Citroën C-Elysée WTCC	Y	15	+14.956	12	10
6	33	(China) Ma Qing Hua	Citroën Total WTCC	Citroën C-Elysée WTCC		15	+19.697	7	8
7^{1}	5	(Hungary) Norbert Michelisz	Zengő Motorsport	Honda Civic WTCC	Y	15	+17.948	16	6
8	3	(United Kingdom) Tom Chilton	ROAL Motorsport	Chevrolet RML Cruze TC1	Y	15	+21.338	5	4
9	19	(Sweden) Rickard Rydell	Nika International	Honda Civic WTCC		15	+30.607	15	2
10	11	(France) Grégoire Demoustier	Craft Bamboo	Chevrolet RML Cruze TC1	Y	15	+32.304	14	1
11	68	(France) Yvan Muller	Citroën Total WTCC	Citroën C-Elysée WTCC		15	+43.627	9	
12	27	(France) John Filippi	Campos Racing	Chevrolet RML Cruze TC1	Y	15	+1:12.280	18	
Ret	98	(Serbia) Dušan Borković	Proteam Racing	Honda Civic WTCC	Y	8	Race incident	13	
Ret	4	(Netherlands) Tom Coronel	ROAL Motorsport	Chevrolet RML Cruze TC1	Y	4	Retired	2	
Ret	12	(United Kingdom) Robert Huff	Lada Sport Rosneft	Lada Vesta WTCC		2	Retired	11	
Ret	15	(United Kingdom) James Thompson	Lada Sport Rosneft	Lada Vesta WTCC		1	Retired	1	
Ret	26	(Italy) Stefano D'Aste	ALL-INKL.COM Münnich Motorsport	Chevrolet RML Cruze TC1	Y	0	Race incident	3	
DNS	7	(France) Hugo Valente	Campos Racing	Chevrolet RML Cruze TC1	Y	0	Did not start	17	

Bold denotes Fastest lap.

^1 — Michelisz was dropped one place in the final classification for a collision with Ma.

== Standings after the event ==
Drivers' Championship standings

Pos	Driver	Points
1	(Argentina) José María López	48
2	(France) Sébastien Loeb	43
3	(Portugal) Tiago Monteiro	28
4	(France) Yvan Muller	22
5	(Italy) Gabriele Tarquini	22

Yokohama Trophy standings

Pos	Driver	Points
1	(Hungary) Norbert Michelisz	18
2	(Morocco) Mehdi Bennani	15
3	(United Kingdom) Tom Chilton	15
4	(France) Grégoire Demoustier	9
5	(Italy) Stefano D'Aste	6

Manufacturers' Championship standings

Pos	Manufacturer	Points
1	(France) Citroën	95
2	(Japan) Honda	59
3	(Russia) Lada	1

- Note: Only the top five positions are included for both sets of drivers' standings.
