= Autoreview =

Russian car magazine

- Categories: Automobile magazine
- Frequency: Biweekly
- Circulation: 100,000 (2022)
- Founded: 1990
- Company: LLC "Newspaper Auto review"
- Country: Russia
- Language: Russian
- Website: http://www.autoreview.ru/
- ISSN: 1029-8517

Autoreview is a Russian car magazine that was founded in 1990 and originated as "Autoreview Newspaper." It is published biweekly with each edition running between 32 and 64 pages. The magazine is known for its ARCAP safety rating of cars sold in Russia.

== History ==
The magazine was established in 1990. The founder, owner, and editor of Autoreview is Mikhail Podorozhansky. The magazine was originally published by the Lipetsk Regional Committee of the Communist Party, but Pravda printed it for many years.

After the transfer of the print run to Finland, staples were no longer used in the newspaper's production. The publication is now printed on glossy pages in magazine format by Helprint Oy in Finland.

Autoreview is considered to be one of the leading Russian automotive publications, according to Media of Russia. Journalists of Autoreview have been involved with the following main international road contests:

- European Car of the Year (Michael Podorozhansky)
- World Car of the Year (Leonid Golovanov)
- Engine of the Year (Leonid Golovanov, Mikhail Podorozhansky)
- Auto best (Maxim Kadakov)
- Truck of the Year (Fedor Lapshin)
- Van of the Year (Fedor Lapshin).

Journalists at Autoreview were repeatedly awarded with the prestigious Russian and international awards for their contribution to automotive journalism, and the edition in 2008 and 2011, the recognized market leader in the category "Car Edition" version ARPP - Association of Periodical Press production.

== Publishing projects ==
Auto-review includes a number of projects:

- Comparative tests of vehicles based on the polygon NITSIAMT in Dmitrov.
- Life test vehicles and a crash test procedure Euro NCAP independent rating ARCAP. Tests of child seats, fuel, tires and various automotive accessories.
- Autoreview conducts its own expedition (the Altay, the Aral Sea, Georgia, Naryan-Mar, Surgut, Novy Urengoy, etc.).
- The magazine Autosport, produced from January 2000 September 2008, discussed events in the world of motorsports. Chief editors were Rustam Akiniyazov (2000-2006 gg.) and Vadim Ovsyankin (2006-2008 gg.). Autosport has been discontinued. Formally, the publication is believed to have been converted into the same category of Autoreview, but it existed in the newspaper until the closing of " Motorsport ". Editor lists - Nikita Gudkov.
- Journal Autoreview Ukraine, which was a Russian edition of Autoreview with supplemented material provided by Ukrainian editorial journalists from Autoreview in Kyiv. Extended only to the territory of Ukraine. Editor - Maxim Kadakov.
- The category Trucks and buses is actually a magazine within the Autoreview publication covering Trucks and Buses. Editor - Fedor Lapshin.
- Museum of crews and vehicles, located in the Moscow park Kuzminki. The museum features unique cars, restored in the museum. There is an exposition of cars after crash tests conducted by the publication. Since October 2009, the museum has been closed for re-exposition.
- Technical Center, located in the Dmitrov avtopoligona (NITSIAMT). Technical Director - Ivan Shadrichev, administrator - Natalia Shevtsova.
- In First Channel Russian television came out with a TV program "Podorozhnik."
- Racing team "Autoreview" participates in the Lada Granta Cup. Vladimir Melnikov provides coverage for the publication.

== See also ==
- ARCAP
- Crash test
- Moose test
