= Lada Priora =

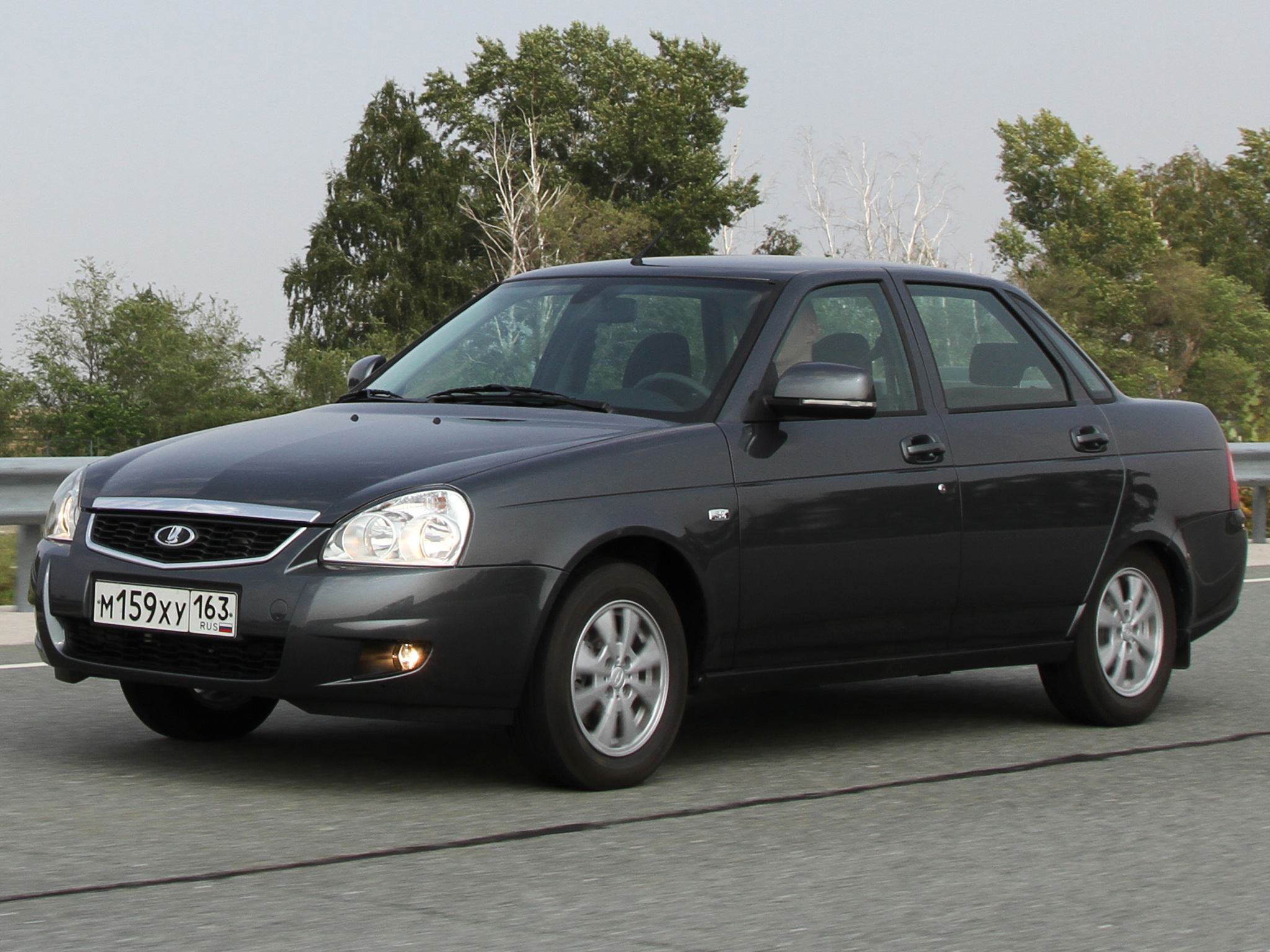
- 2011 Lada Priora (facelift)

Overview
- Manufacturer: Lada (AvtoVAZ)
- Also called: Lada Consul (limited luxury version); VAZ 2170 (sedan); VAZ 2171 (station wagon); VAZ 2172 (hatchback)
- Production: March 2007 – July 2018; May 2009 – 2015 (2171); February 2008 – 2015 (2172); January 2010 – 2015 (Coupé)
- Assembly: Russia: Tolyatti (AvtoVAZ & Super-Avto); Russia: Argun (ChechenAvto); Romania: Bucharest (Dunarea)

Body and chassis
- Class: Compact car (C)
- Body style: 4-door saloon 3-door hatchback 5-door hatchback 5-door estate
- Layout: Front-engine, front-wheel-drive
- Related: Lada 110

Powertrain
- Engine: 1.6 L I4; 1.8 L I4
- Transmission: 5-speed manual 5-speed automated manual

Dimensions
- Wheelbase: 2,492 mm (98.1 in)
- Length: 4,290 mm (168.9 in)
- Width: 1,661 mm (65.4 in)
- Height: 1,420 mm (55.9 in)

Chronology
- Predecessor: Lada 110
- Successor: Lada Vesta

The Lada Priora is a compact car produced by the Russian automaker AvtoVAZ from March 2007 to July 2018. It is largely a restyled and modernised Lada 110 which it replaced in 2009. By May 16, 2012, 590,000 Prioras had been produced.

In 2014, the Prioras replacement the Lada Vesta was unveiled during the Moscow International Automobile Salon and in September 2015, the Lada Vesta started production. Starting in 2016, the Priora was withdrawn from the foreign market and was unavailable for export whilst continuing to be produced in Russia.

On July 16, 2018 a photo appeared online of the last Lada Priora to be produced in the AvtoVAZ Tolyatti plant, decorated with colored balloons and covered with a poster with the inscription "Последний!" ("Last!"). The photo was taken between July 11 and July 13 (based on the poster in the photo). The last of the remaining Prioras were assembled using previously welded bodies. On July 17, 2018, AutoVAZ confirmed the discontinuation of the Priora production in an official release.

== Body styles ==
- VAZ-2170: base sedan (produced from March 2007 to July 2018);
- VAZ-2171 Universal: station wagon (produced from May 2009 to 2015);
- VAZ-2172: 5-door hatchback (produced from February 2008 to 2015);
- VAZ-2172 Coupé: 3-door hatchback, based on the 5-door hatchback (produced from January 2008 to 2015);
- VAZ-21708 Priora Premier: long-wheelbase version of the sedan, with an extra 175 mm Small-scale production by AvtoVAZ partner ZAO Super-Avto. Equipped with a 120 hp 1.8-liter VAZ-21128 engine (low volume production since the autumn of 2008)

In June 2011, AvtoVAZ announced that they will offer soon a version with a 90 hp engine, the weight will be reduced by 39% compared to the 98 hp basic engine. The engine will be more long-lasting with up to 200,000 km mileage. There were minor changes to the car: the front bumper, rear-view mirrors and steering wheel were replaced. New features have been added. Also in the "standard" configuration, a new 8-valve engine with a lightweight connecting rod-piston group was installed. In August, a new version named Lada Priora CNG was announced. It is powered by gasoline and compressed natural gas (CNG). The fuel tank capacity is also 43 liter and the four gas tanks 96 liter. The range with gasoline is 580 km (360 mi) and 330 km (205 mi) with CNG.

On May 22, 2018, AvtoVAZ announced the long-rumored end of Priora saloon production by July 2018; the hatchback and estate variants had already ended production by end of 2015 as the sedan had been accounting for over 80 percent of sales mix.

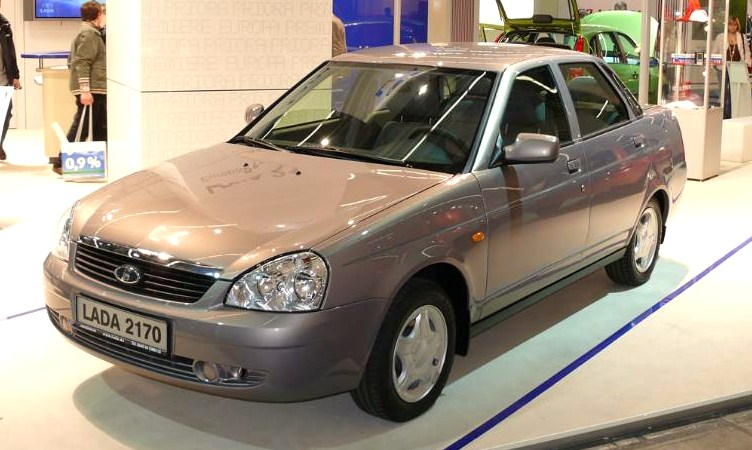
Lada Priora 2170 saloon (pre-facelift)

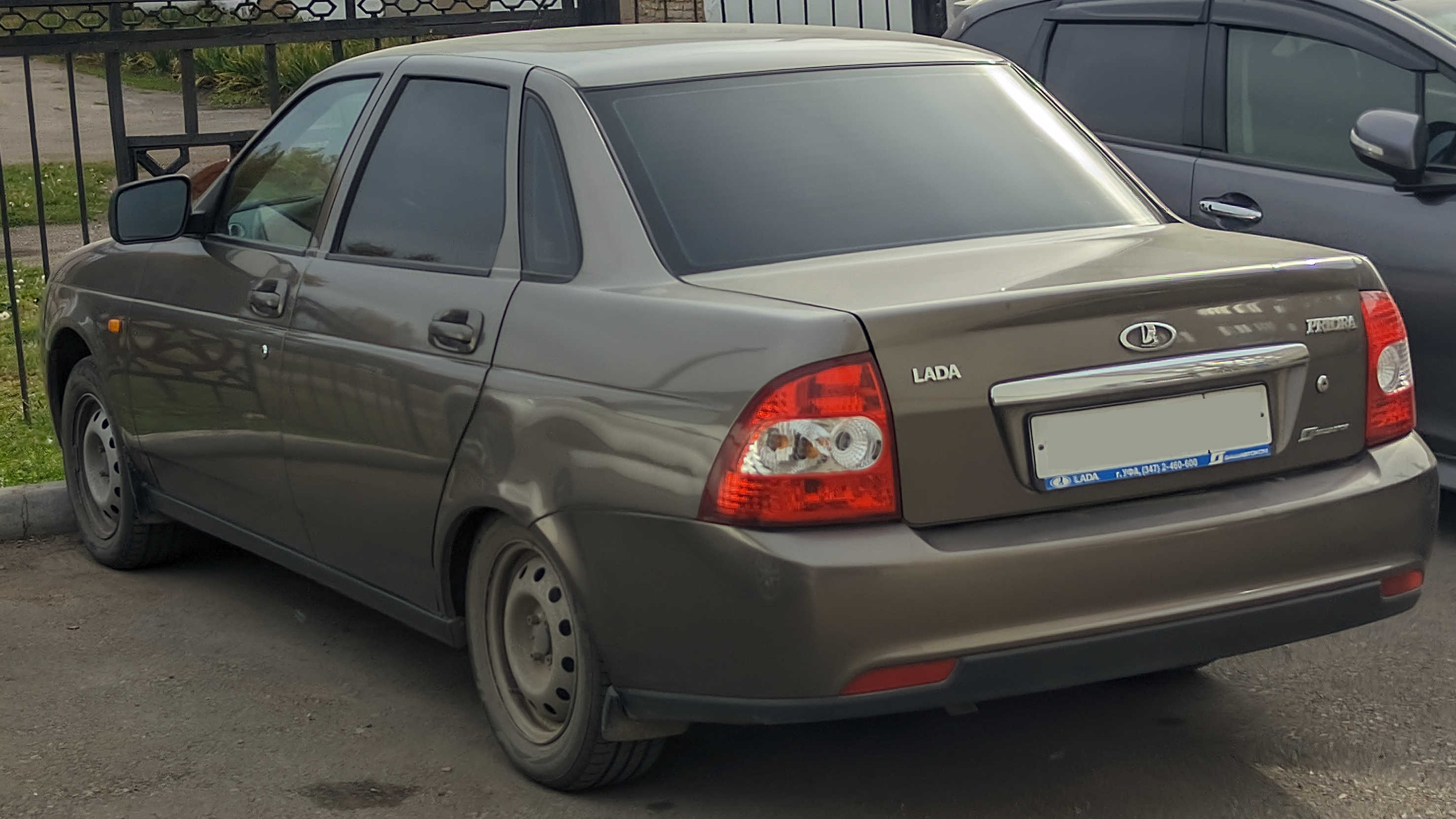
Lada Priora 2170 saloon (rear view)

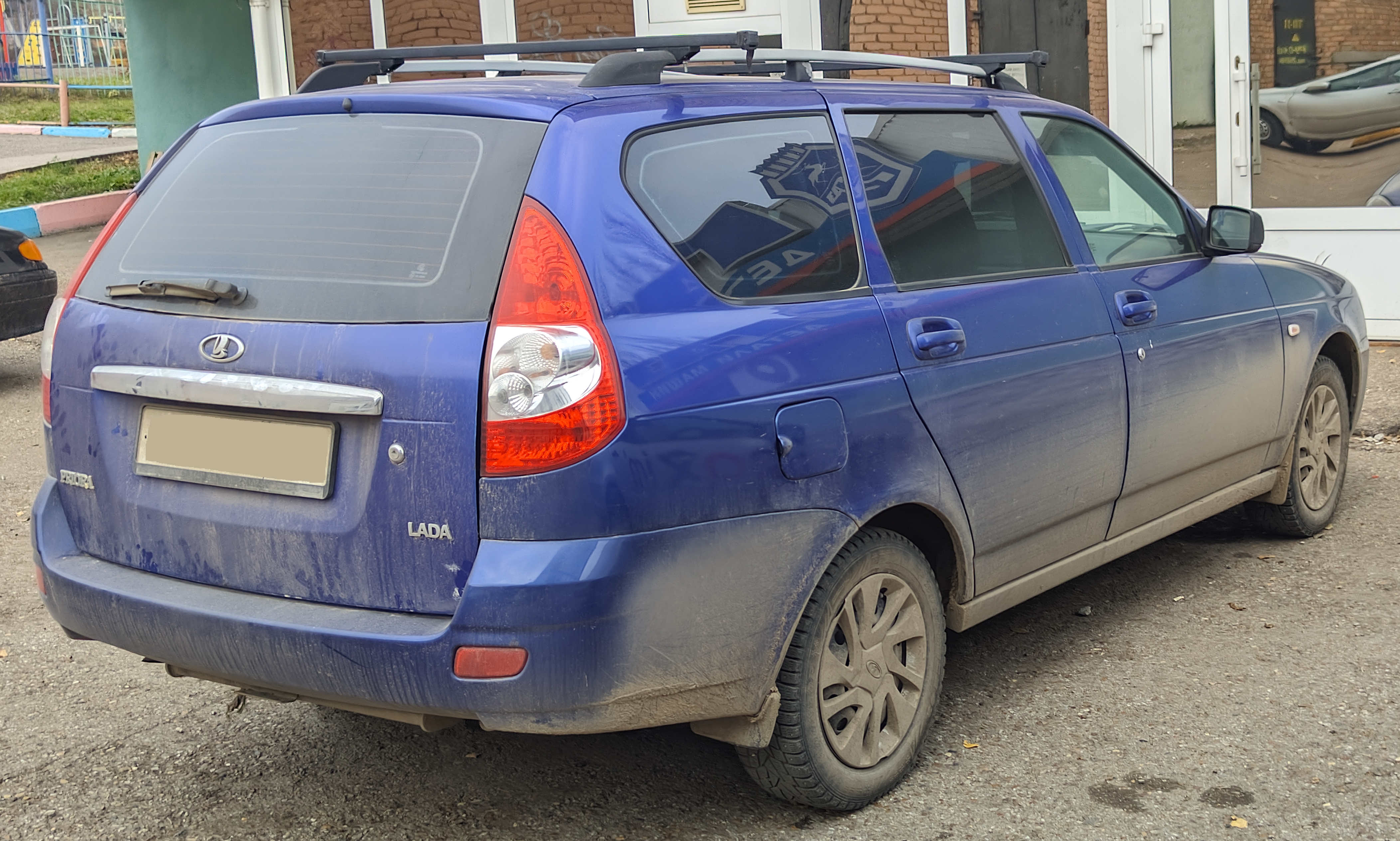
Lada Priora 2171 Universal (rear view)

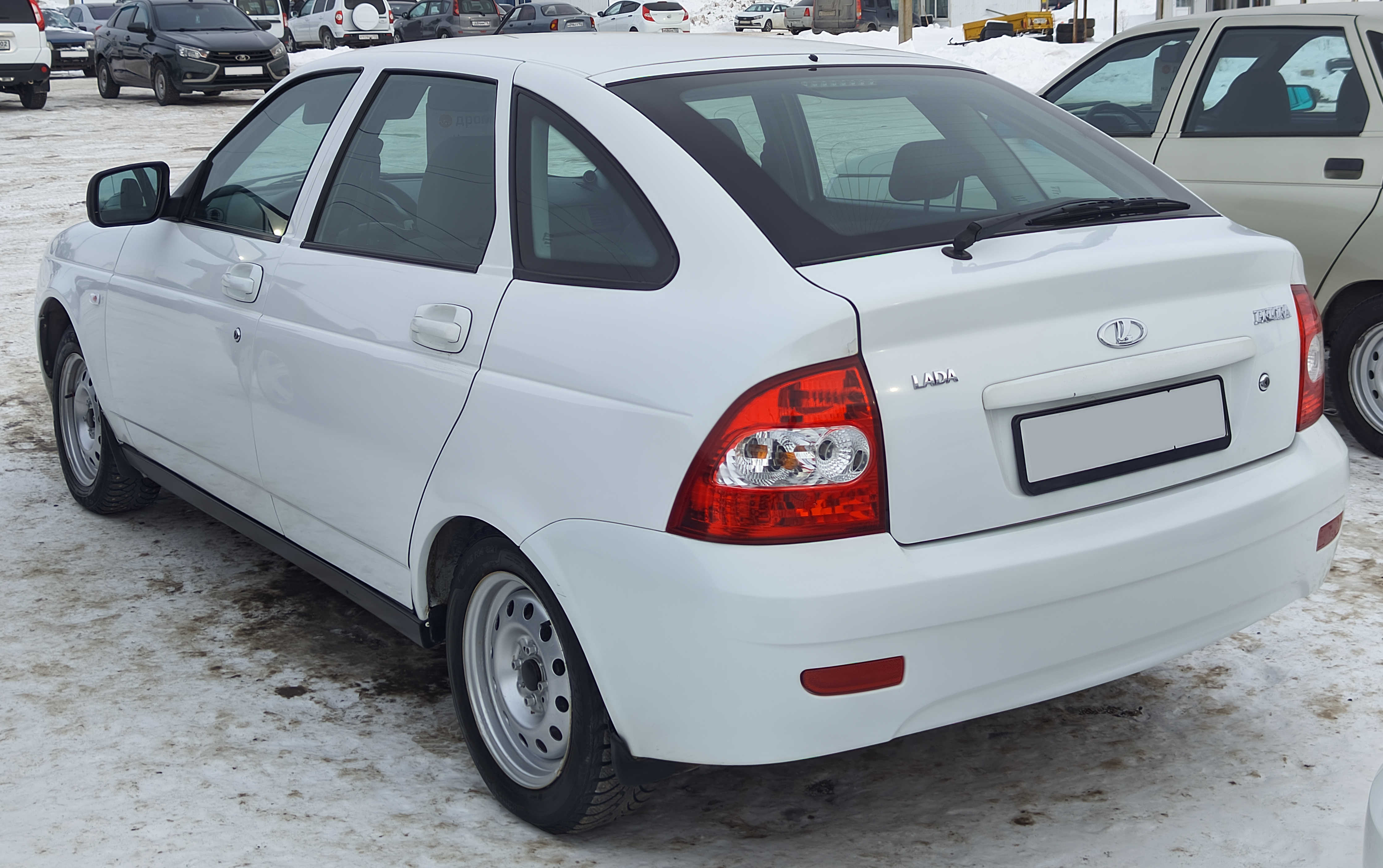
Lada Priora 2172 hatchback (rear view)

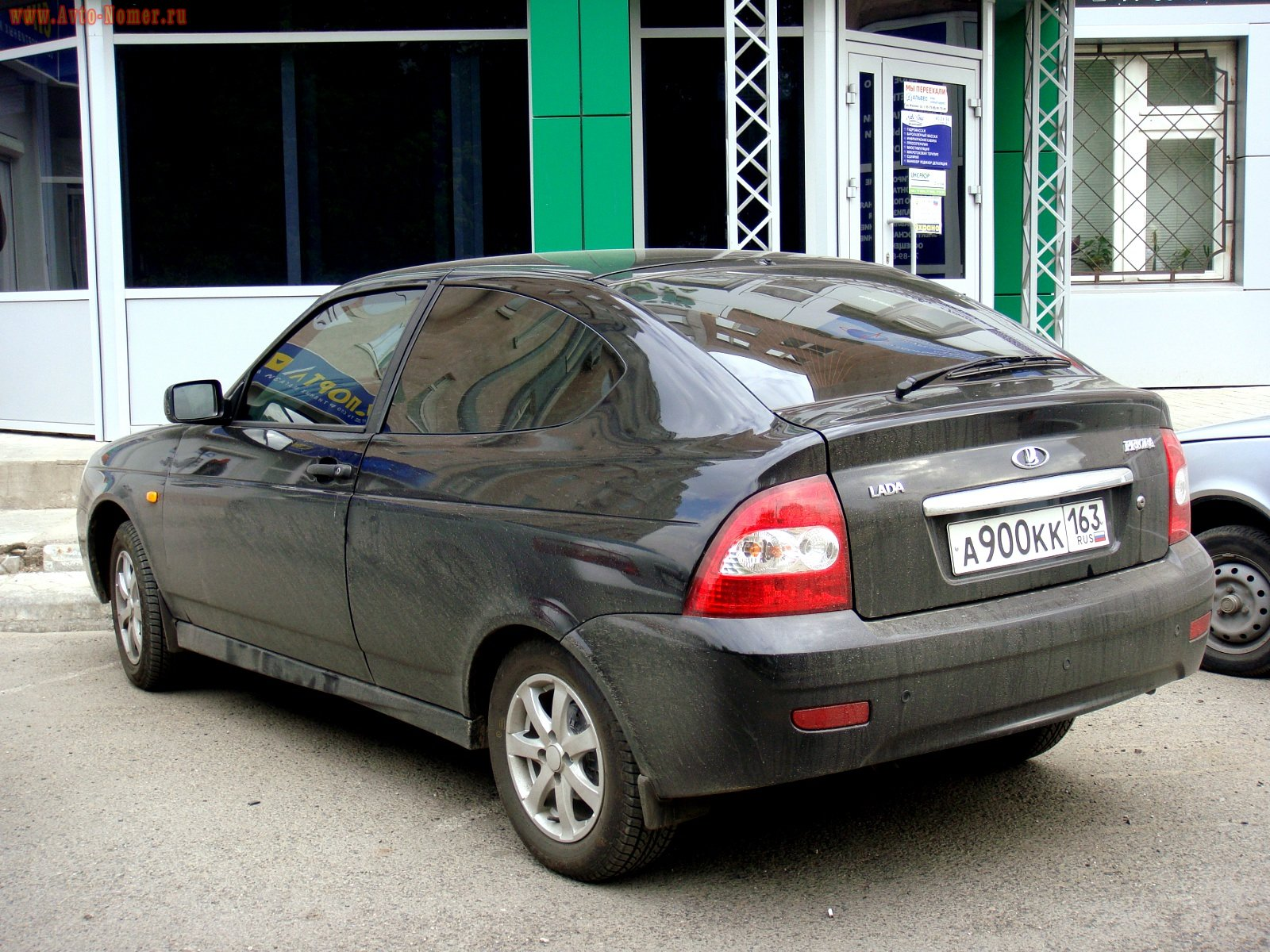
Lada Priora 2172 Coupé (rear view)

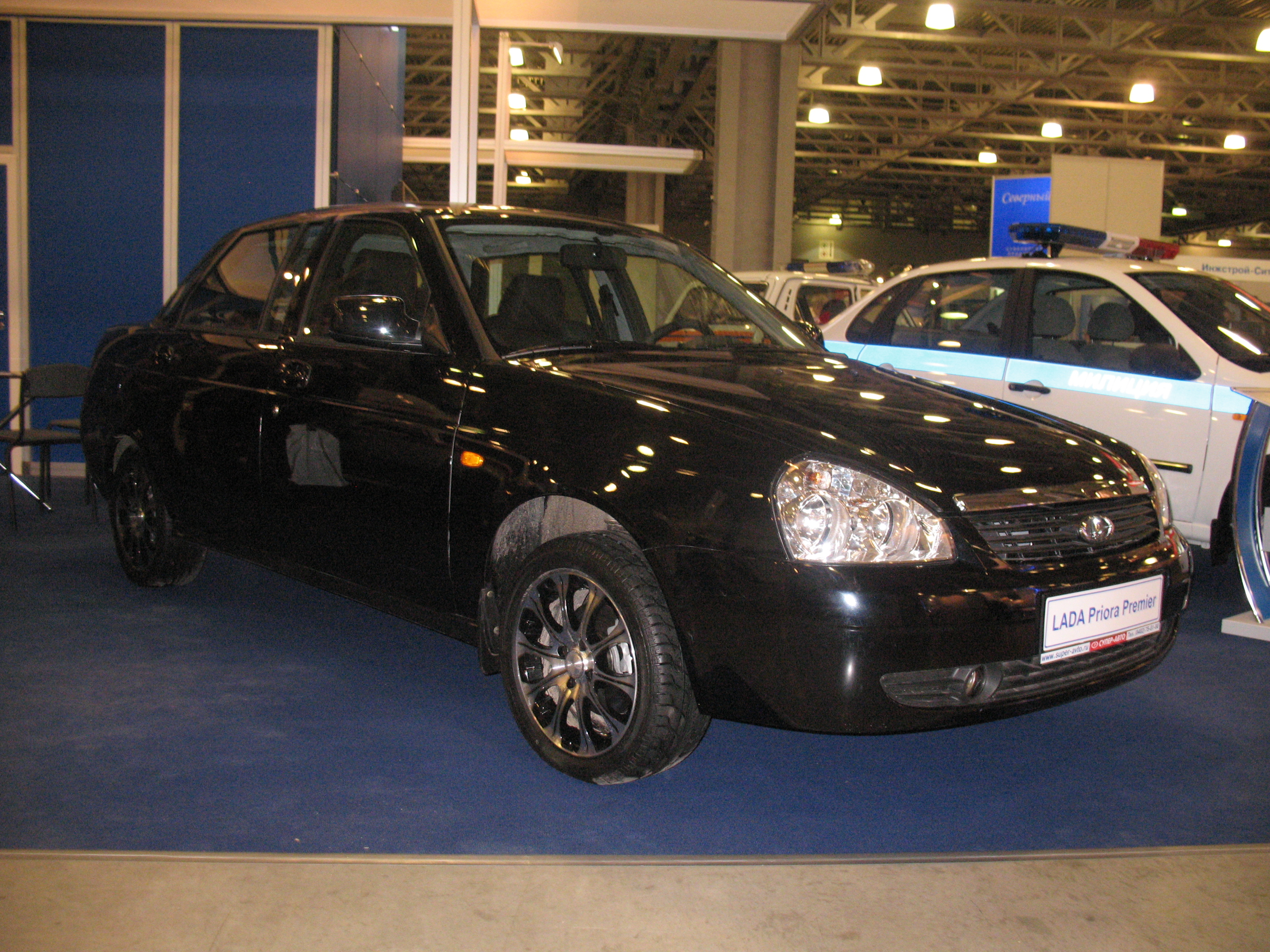
Lada Priora Premier 21708

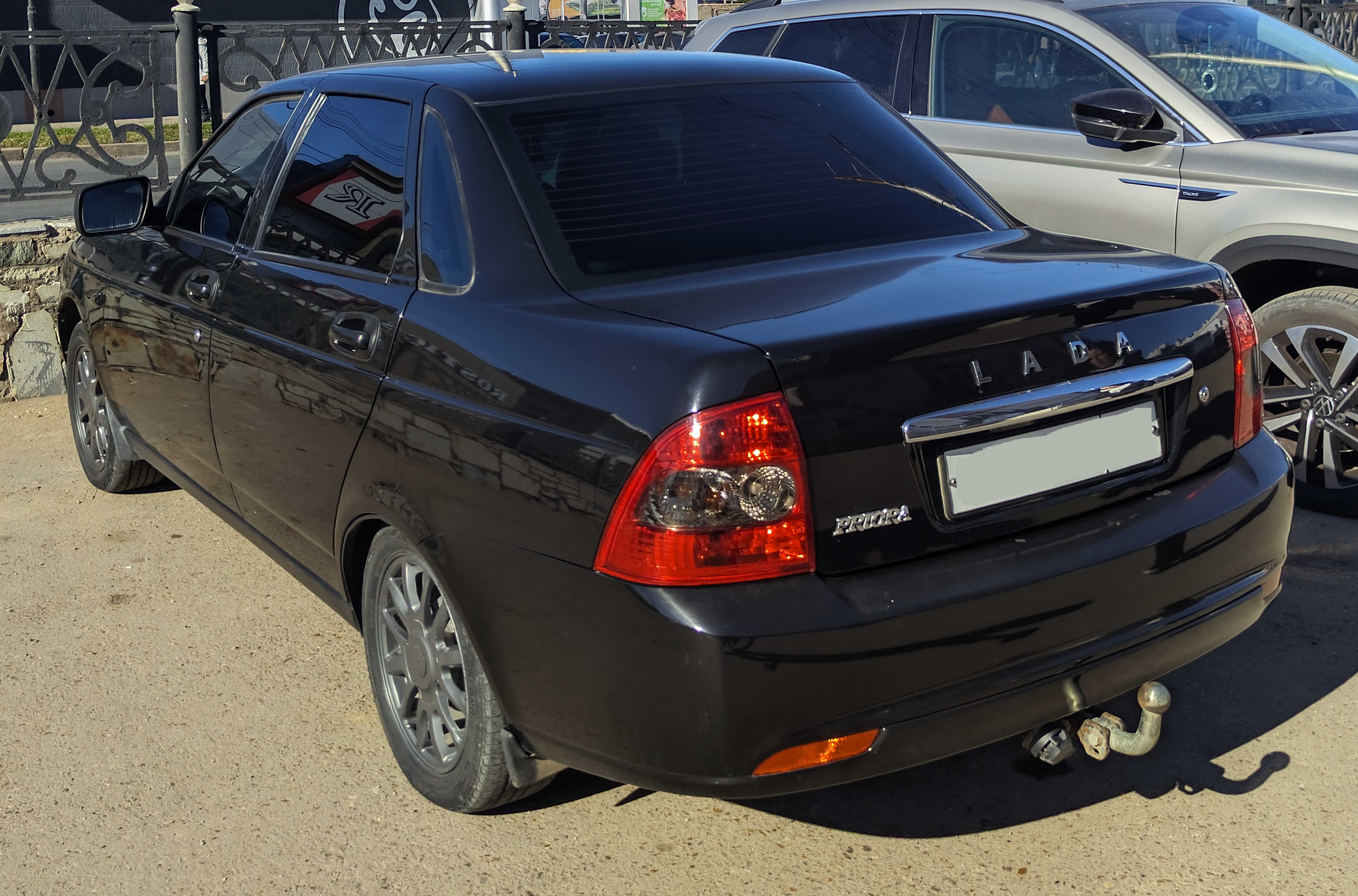
2017 Lada Priora Black Edition (facelift)

== Equipment ==
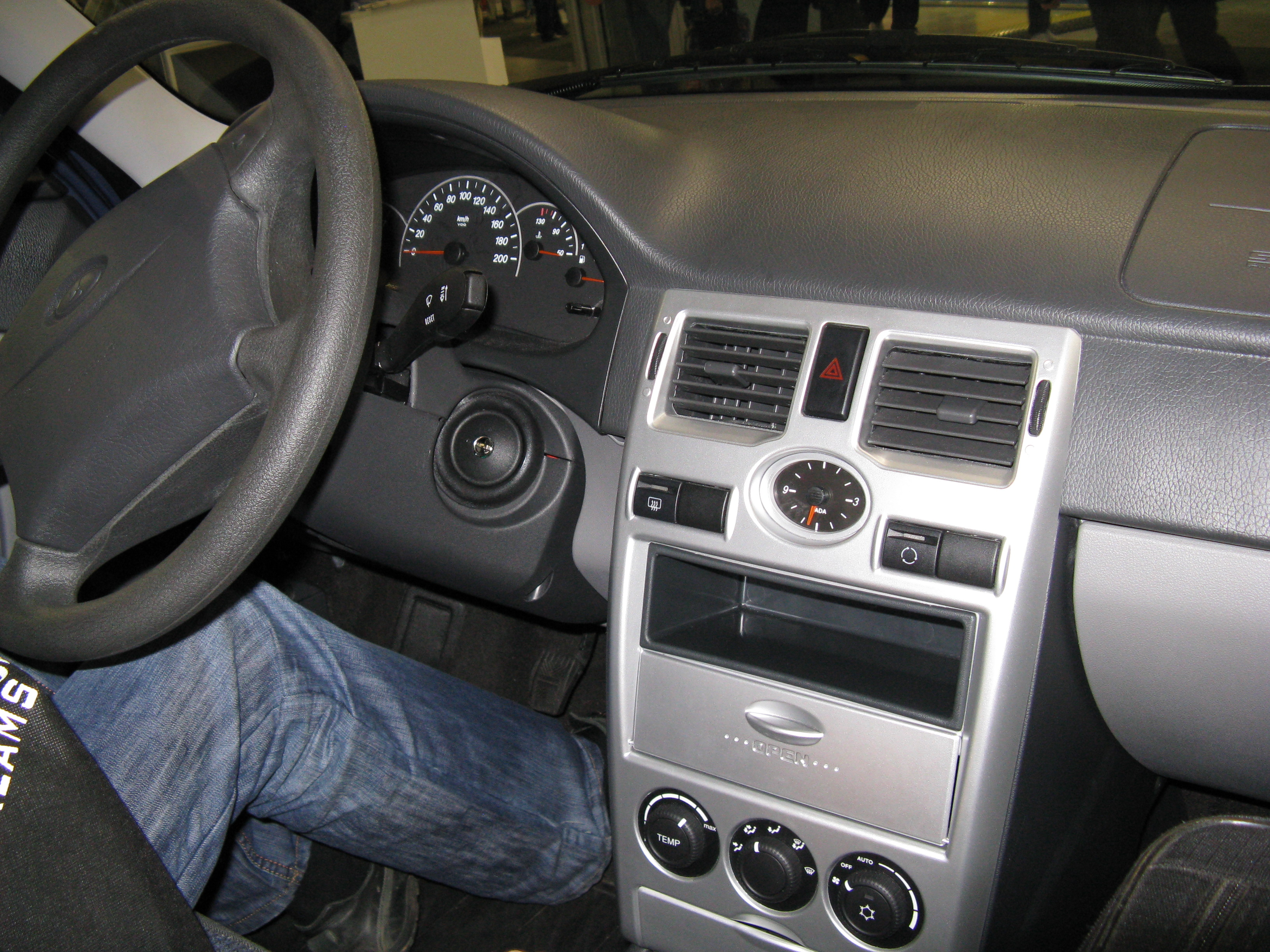
Interior ver.2007 / standard compl.

Base Prioras comes with a standard driver's side airbag and electric power steering. Since May 2008, Lada Priora offers a «Lux» package, which includes passenger airbag (and more recently front side airbags), seat belt pretensioners in the front seats, ABS and parking sensors. In addition, some packages add standard air conditioning with climate control, integrated audio with bluetooth handsfree, heated front seats, automatic headlamps, and rain sensor. In April 2010, an optional multimedia system was added to the options list, followed by a navigation system in early 2011. On the other hand, electronic stability control and fully automatic transmission are not offered.

The car received a 1.6 L engine with 16 valves and a new transmission, designed to transfer torque of 145 N·m, and a box set of closed transmission bearings with an extended lifespan.

The maximum speed of the Priora 1.8 L is 190 km/h (118 mph), with acceleration from 0–100 km/h (62 mph) in 10 seconds.

Lada Priora 1.6 AMT (106 hp), equipped with an automated manual transmission, debuted in 2014. The AMT gearbox is made on the base of a standard five-speed manual transmission, but was supplemented with electro-hydraulic actuators and an electronic control unit of the ZF Group.

== Motorsport ==
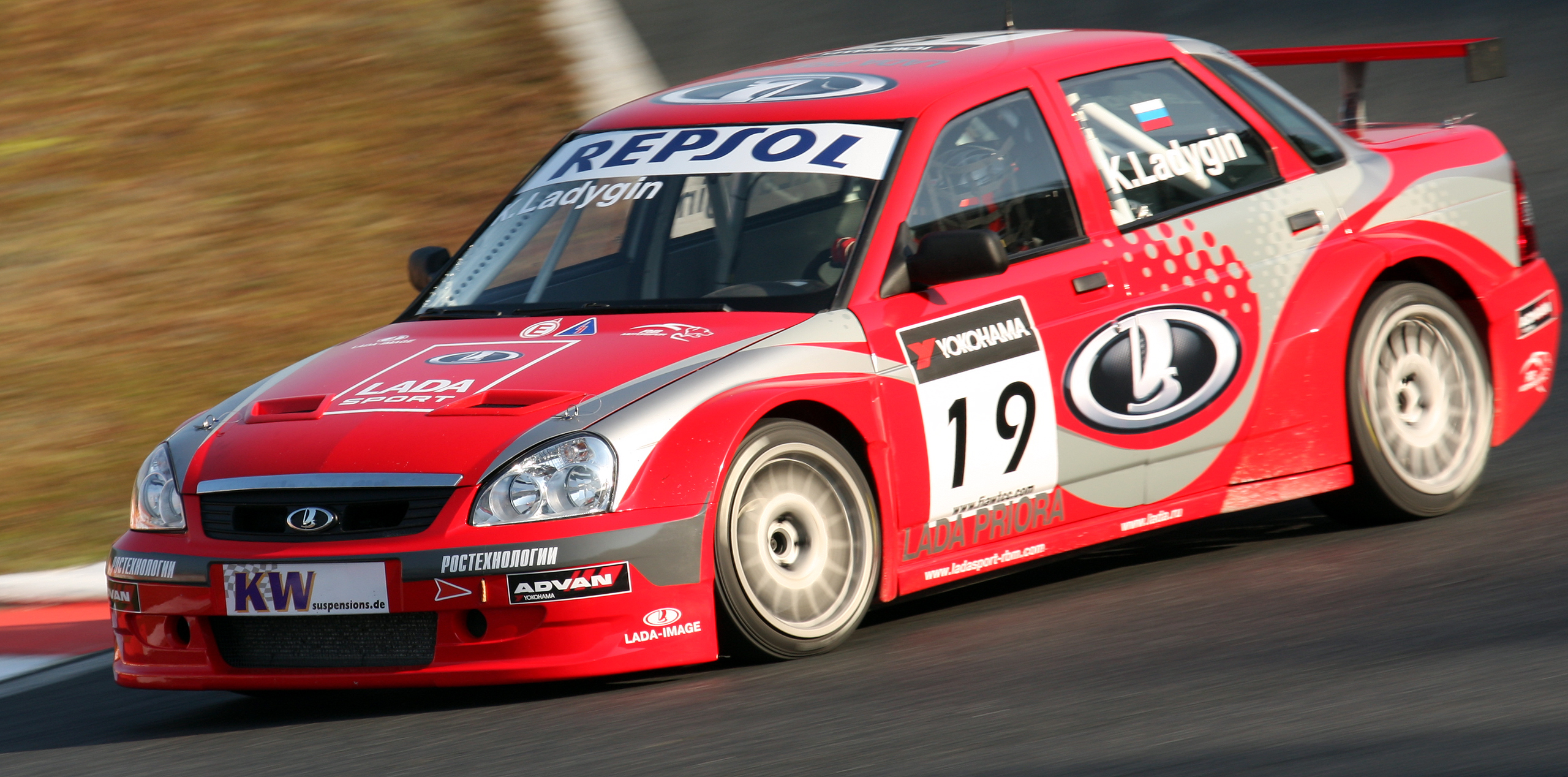
Kirill Ladygin 2009 WTCC Lada Priora

The LADA Sport team contested the latter part of the 2009 World Touring Car Championship season with a trio of Prioras, having started the season with Lada 110s.

== Safety ==
The car scored 5.4 points out of 16 in a frontal crash test conducted by the Russian ARCAP safety assessment program in 2007, and was awarded one star out of four. A newer version of the car scored 10.6 points out of 16.
