= Lada Granta =

Russian subcompact car

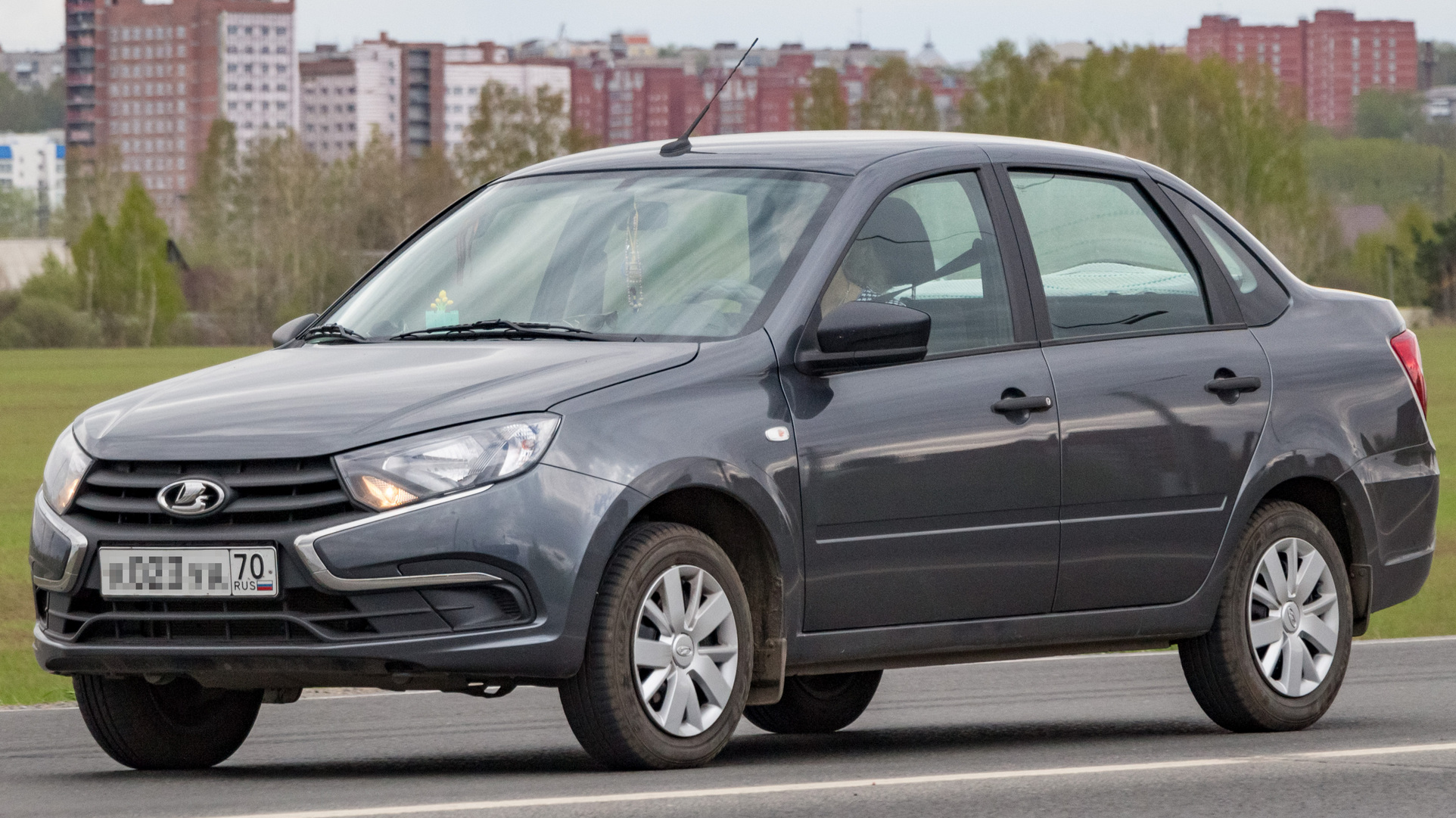
- Lada Granta saloon (facelift)

Overview
- Manufacturer: Lada (AvtoVAZ)
- Also called: Lada 2190
- Production: December 2011–present
- Model years: 2012–present
- Assembly: Russia: Tolyatti (AvtoVAZ); Russia: Argun (Chechen Avto); Russia: Izhevsk (IzhAvto); Azerbaijan: Ganja (Ganja Auto Plant); Egypt: Cairo (Alamal Group); Kazakhstan: Ust-Kamenogorsk (Asia-Avto); Ukraine: Cherkasy (Bogdan)

Body and chassis
- Class: Subcompact (B)
- Body style: 4-door saloon 5-door liftback (starting 2014 model year); 5-door hatchback 5-door estate (after 2018 facelift)
- Layout: Transverse Front engine, front-wheel-drive
- Related: Lada Kalina; Datsun on-Do

Powertrain
- Engine: 1.6 L VAZ-11183-50/21116 SOHC 8-valve I4 (petrol); 1.6 L VAZ-21126/21127 DOHC 16-valve I4 (petrol)
- Power output: 60 kW (82 PS; 80 hp) (VAZ-11183-50); 65 kW (88 PS; 87 hp) (VAZ-21116); 67 kW (91 PS; 90 hp) (VAZ-21126); 73 kW (99 PS; 98 hp) (VAZ-21126); 79 kW (107 PS; 106 hp) (VAZ-21127)
- Transmission: 5-speed manual 4-speed automatic

Dimensions
- Wheelbase: 2,476 mm (97.5 in)
- Length: 4,260 mm (167.7 in)
- Width: 1,700 mm (66.9 in)
- Height: 1,500 mm (59.1 in)
- Kerb weight: 1,080 kg (2,381 lb)

Chronology
- Predecessor: Lada Kalina
- Successor: Lada Iskra

The Lada Granta (Russian: Ла́да Гра́нта) is a subcompact car developed by Russian automaker AvtoVAZ in collaboration with Renault, based on the Lada Kalina platform. Mass sales started in Russia on 1 December 2011.

Additional production at the Izhevsk plant began in September 2012, after the old VAZ-2107 was removed from production. A five-door hatchback variant, aimed at replacing the discontinued Lada Samara 2 series in the line-up, debuted in 2014.

The Lada Granta was the best-selling car model in Russia from 2013 to 2015.

== Overview ==
The Lada Granta is considered to be a step away from the classic A-, B-, and C-segment class cars and towards the needs of young Russians and small Russian families wanting supermini sedans designs that are somewhat more popular in Russia after 2010. Moreover, the Granta will likely compete with the foreign market in Russia, since most European superminis exported there are hatchbacks, thus are smaller yet more expensive.

The Lada Granta is marketed in Russia, Belarus, Ukraine, Armenia, Azerbaijan, and Egypt. Within the European Union, it has been available in the Czech Republic, Slovakia, Austria, Hungary, France, and Germany.

== Trim levels ==
The car is equipped in three different trim levels: Standard, Norm, and Luxe.

The Norm level includes power steering, front power windows, power door locks, and trip computer, while the Luxe adds passenger airbag, side airbags, anti-lock braking system, electronic stability control, rear power windows, air conditioning, heated mirrors, heated front seats, and multimedia system with a 7-inch touchscreen display.

== Safety ==
The Granta was tested by ARCAP in 2012, earning two stars out of four. The test vehicle had a Takata airbag for the driver, but none for the passenger. The head injury criterion was 522 for the driver and 880 for the passenger.

== Recall ==
In May 2013, AvtoVAZ recalled about 30,000 of sold Lada Grantas and Kalinas because of problems detected in the braking system.

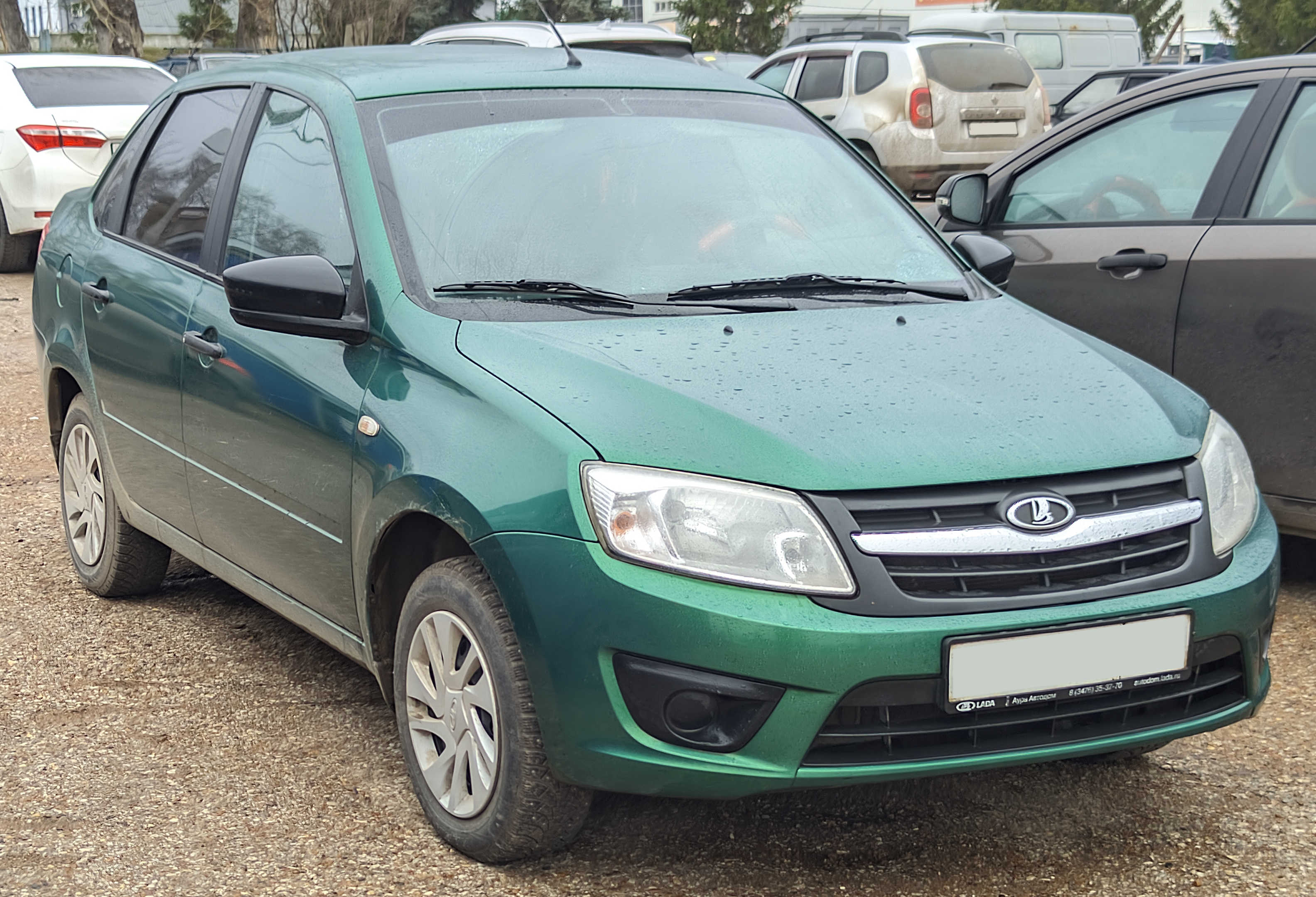
Lada Granta saloon (pre-facelift)

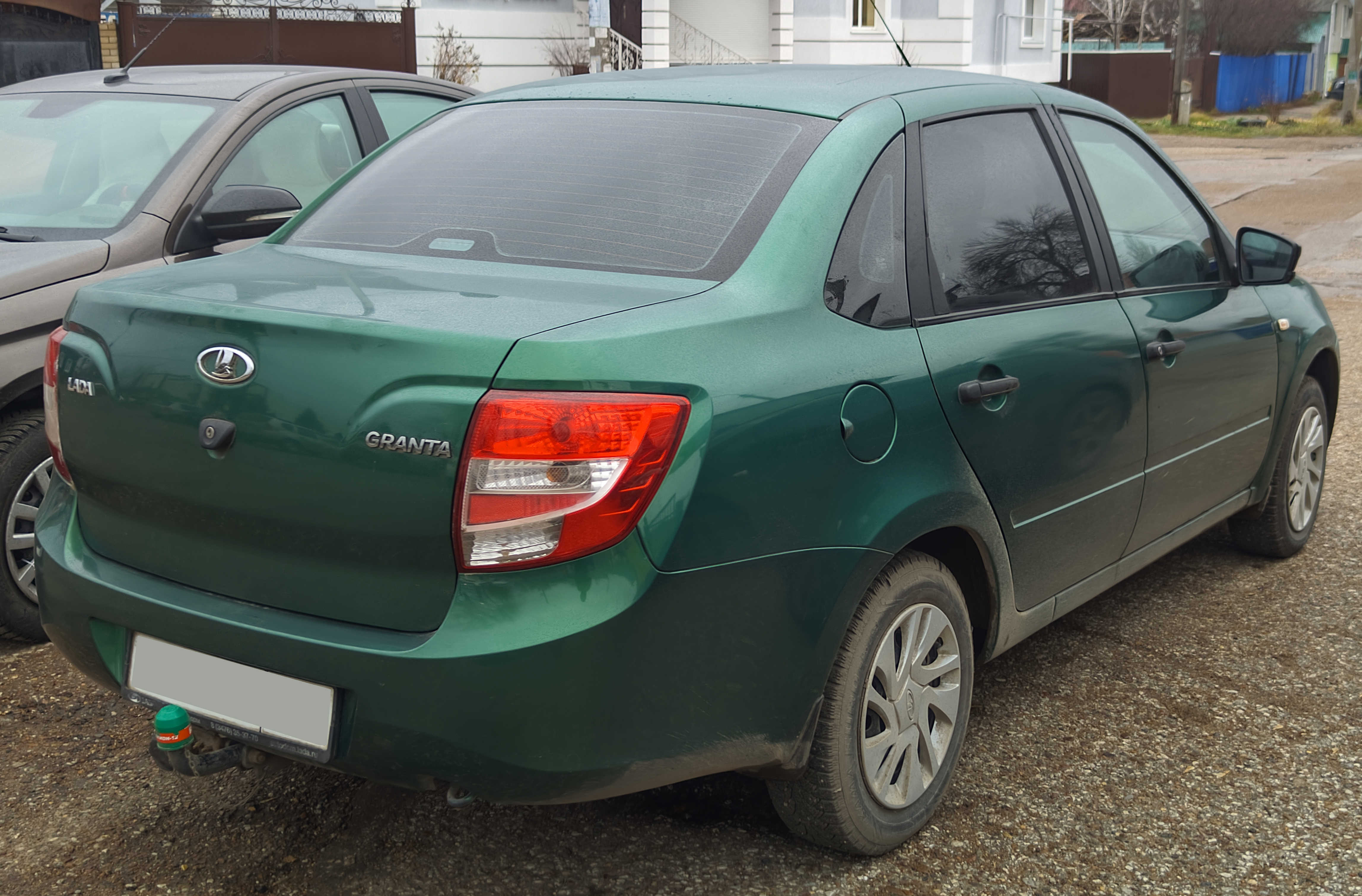
Lada Granta saloon (pre-facelift)

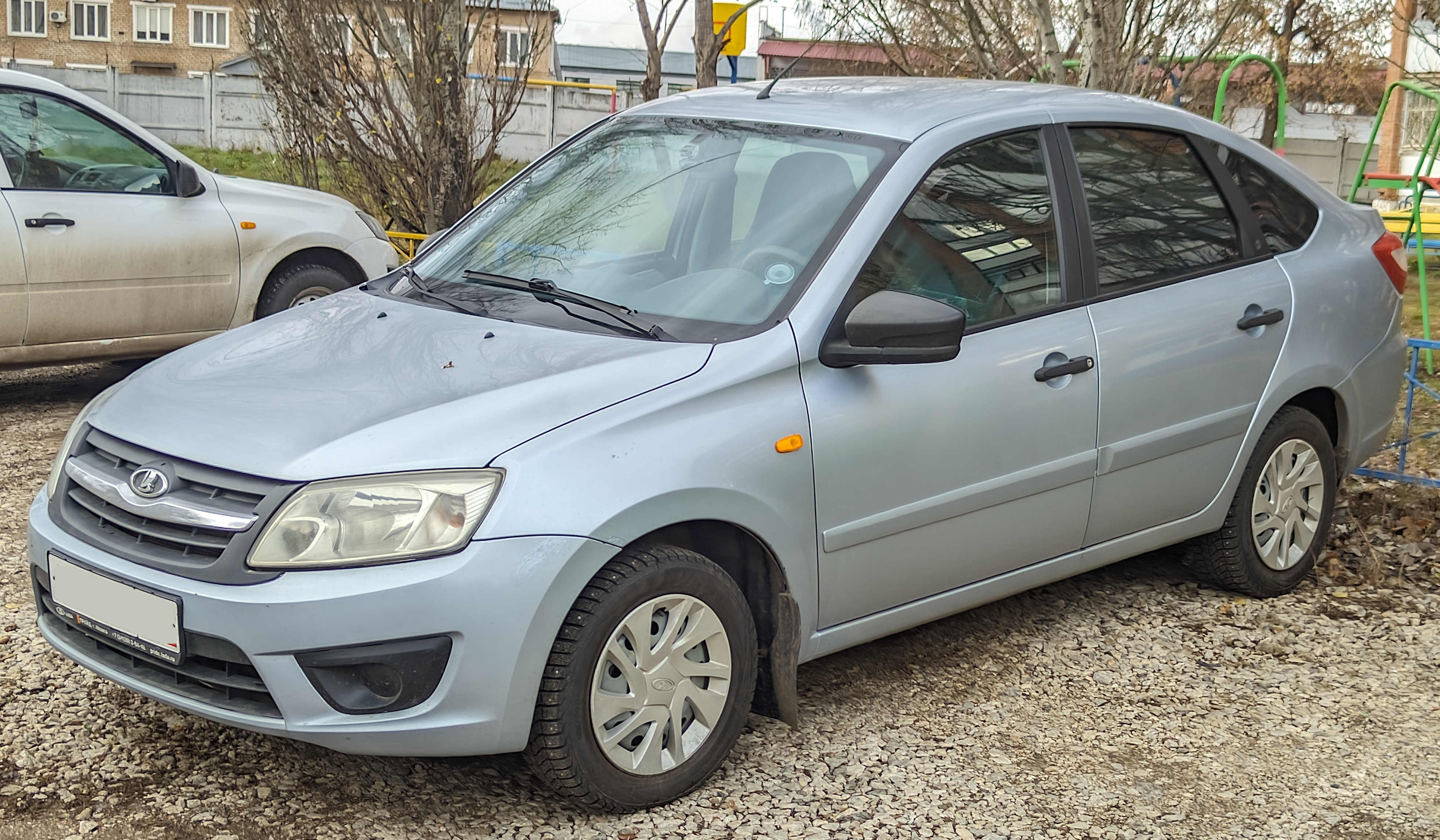
Lada Granta Liftback (pre-facelift)

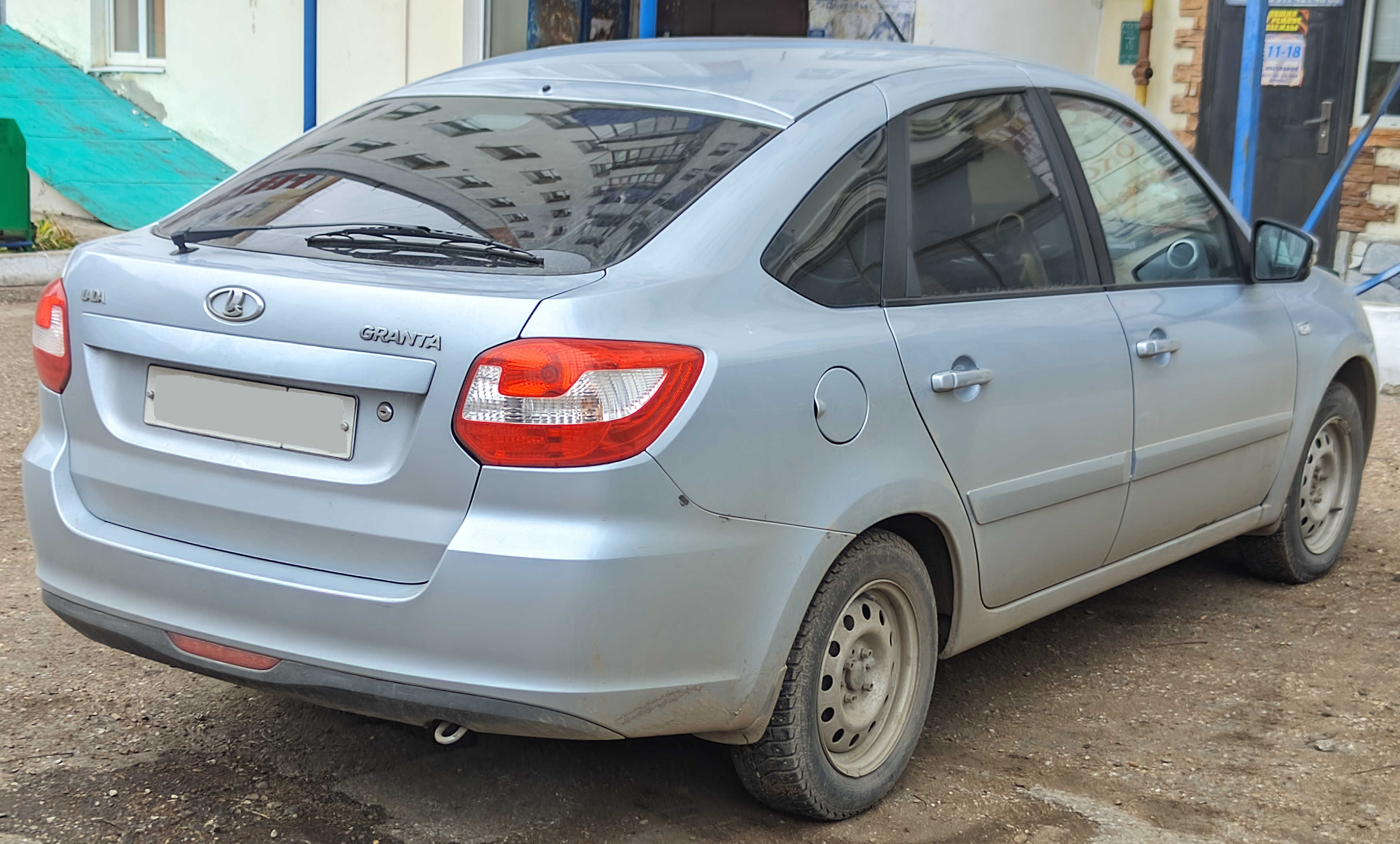
Lada Granta liftback (pre-facelift)

== Facelift (2018) ==
The Lada Granta got a facelift in 2018, which revised the front headlights, grille, and trunk, which now shares its design characteristics with the Lada Vesta and Lada Xray.

In September 2022, Lada offered five versions of the Granta: Sedan, Cross, Liftback, Drive Active, and Station Wagon. The Station Wagon is also available in two special versions, Club and Cross Quest, with the latter featuring painted roof and rails in black, alloy wheels in black and silver, special interior upholstery, cargo net, heated windscreen, two airbags, multimedia capabilities, rear view camera, parking sensors, and air conditioning.

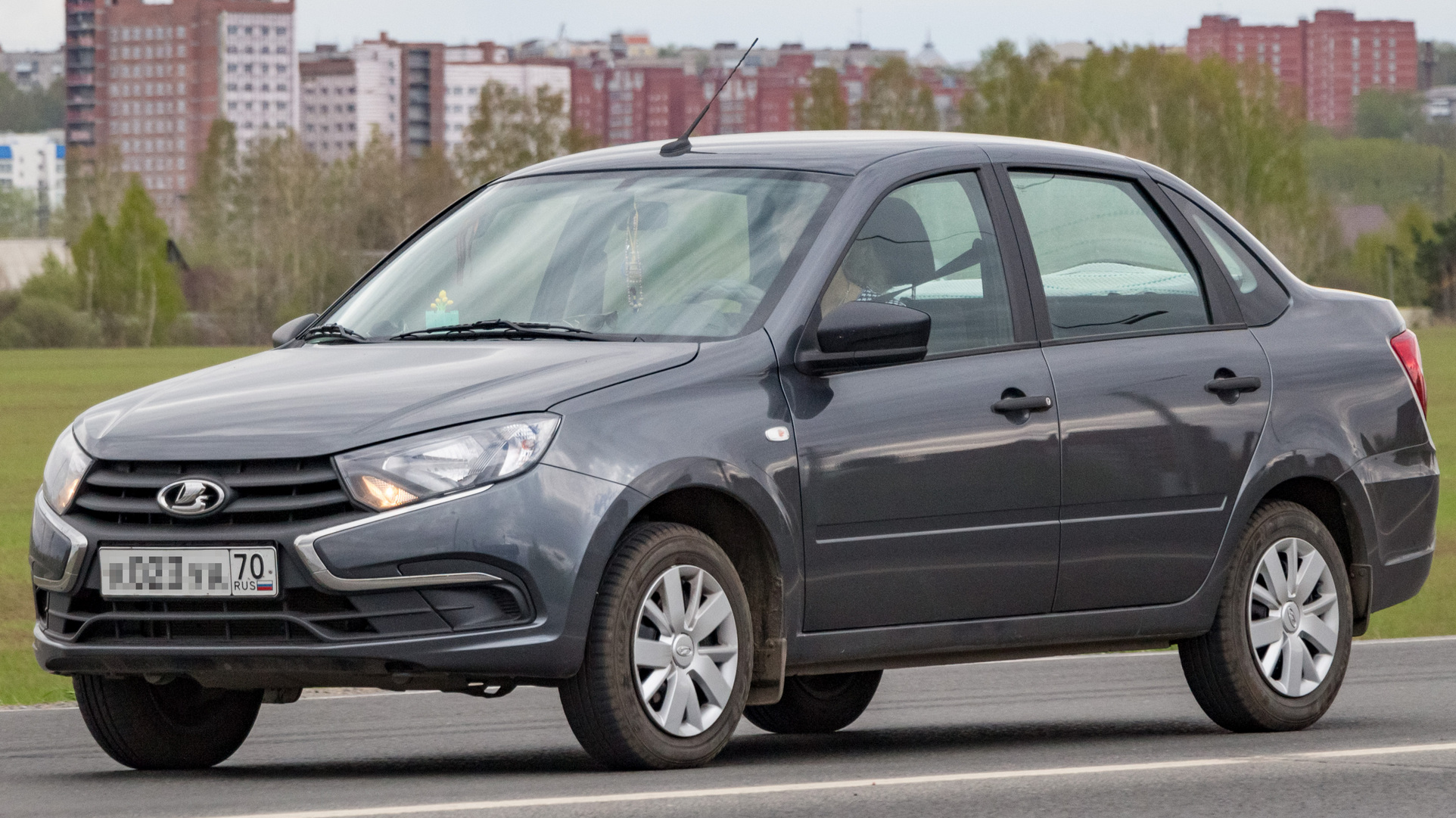
Lada Granta saloon (front view)

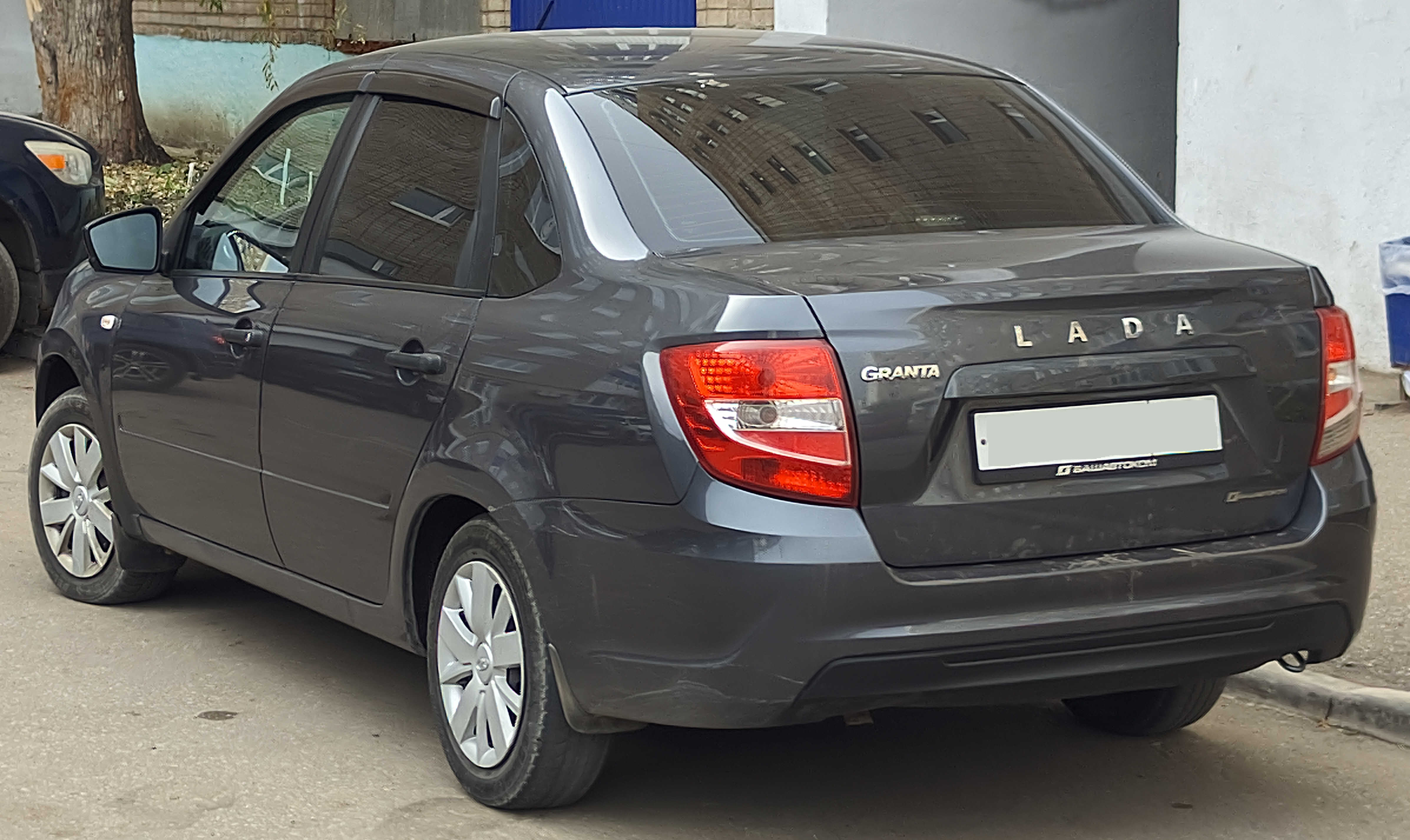
Lada Granta saloon (rear view)

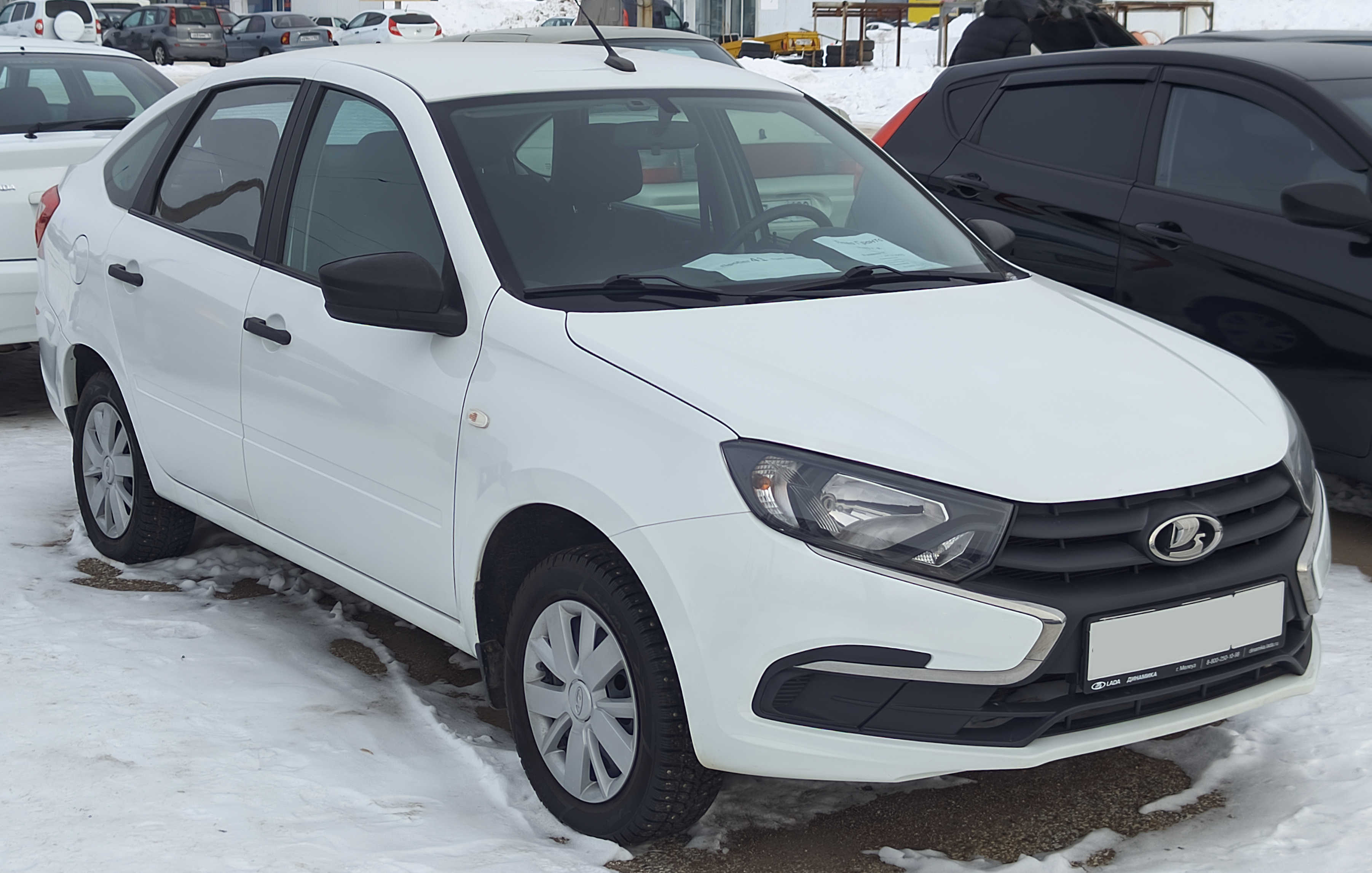
Lada Granta liftback (front view)

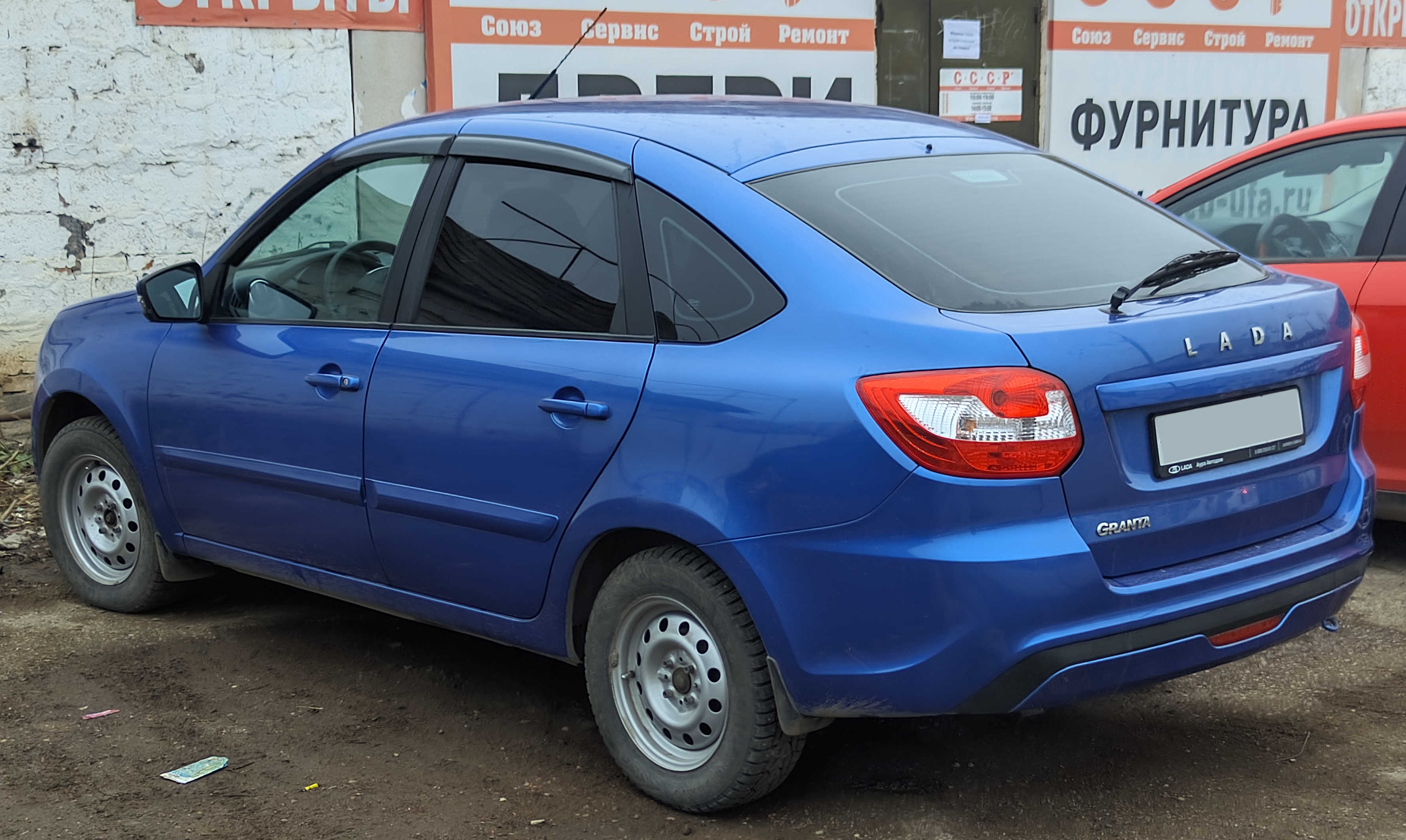
Lada Granta liftback (rear view)

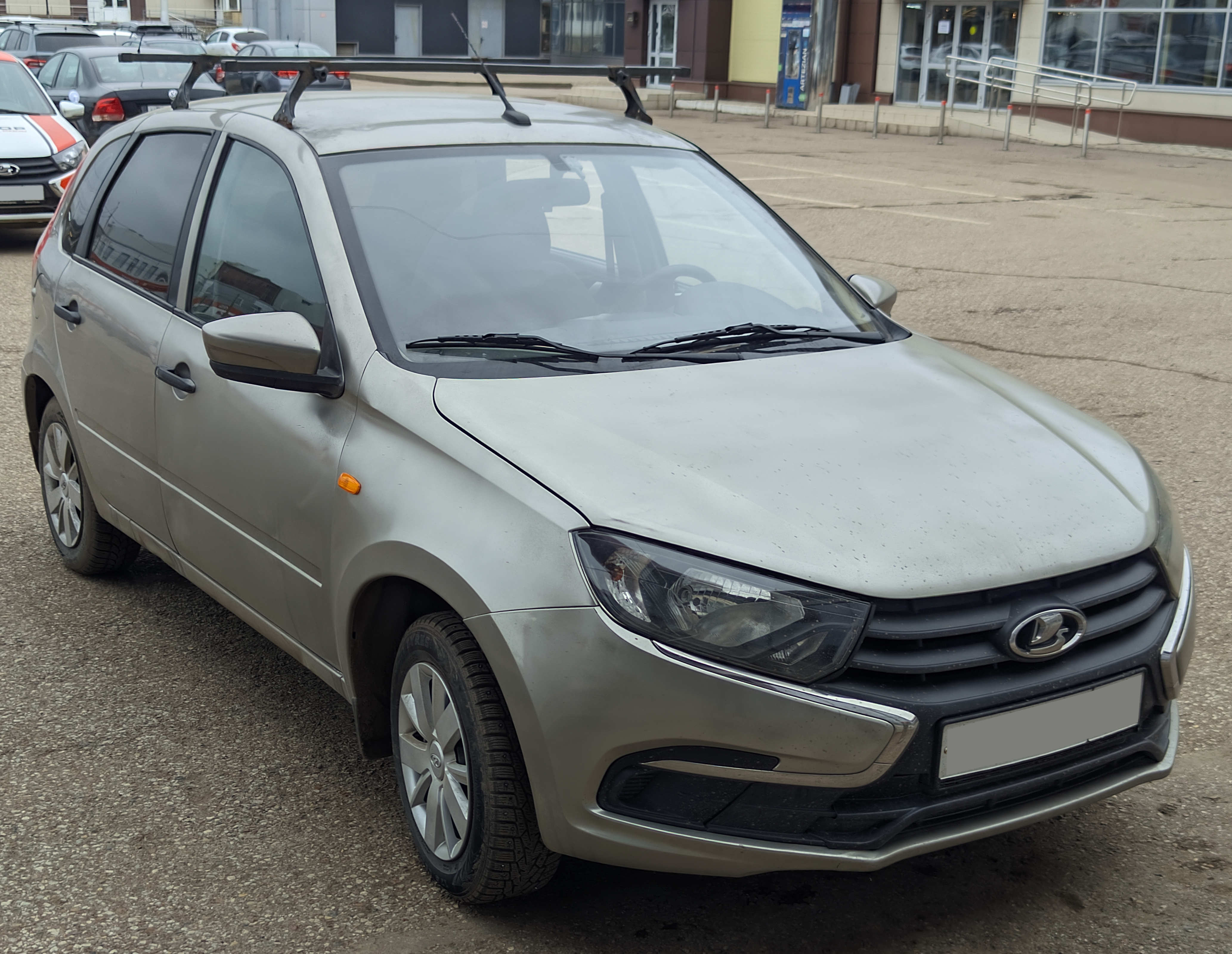
Lada Granta hatchback (front view)

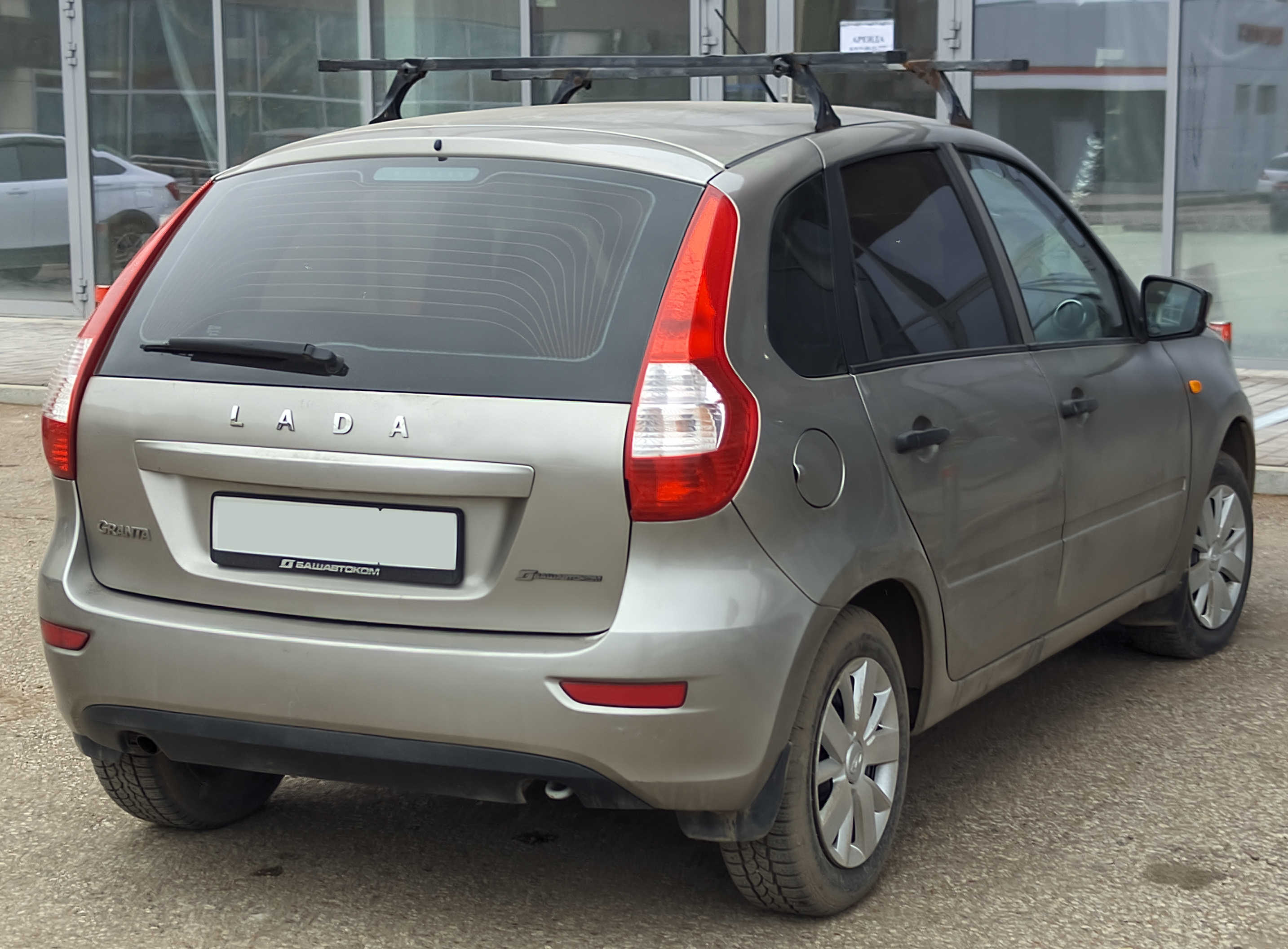
Lada Granta hatchback (rear view)

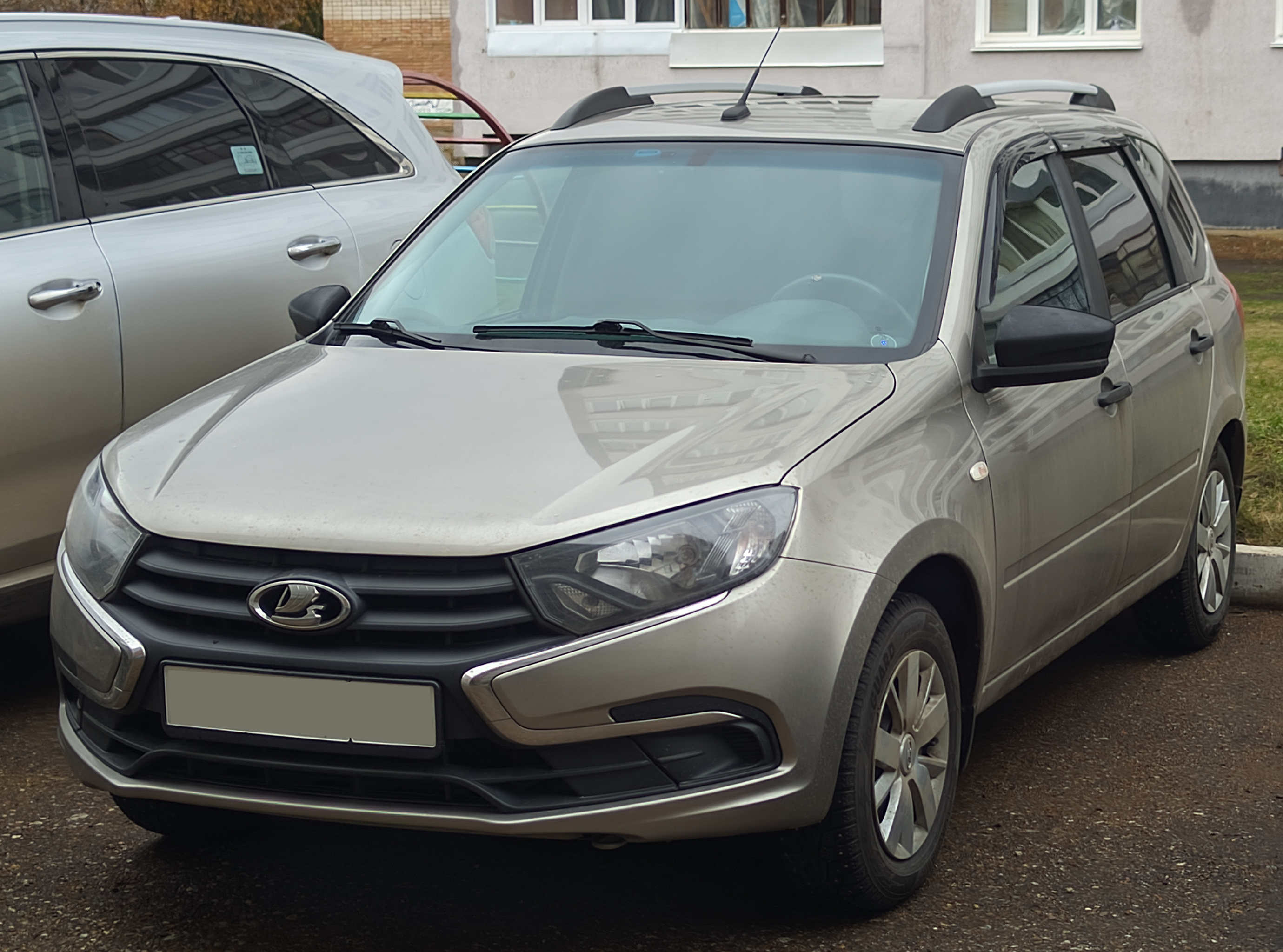
Lada Granta SW (front view)

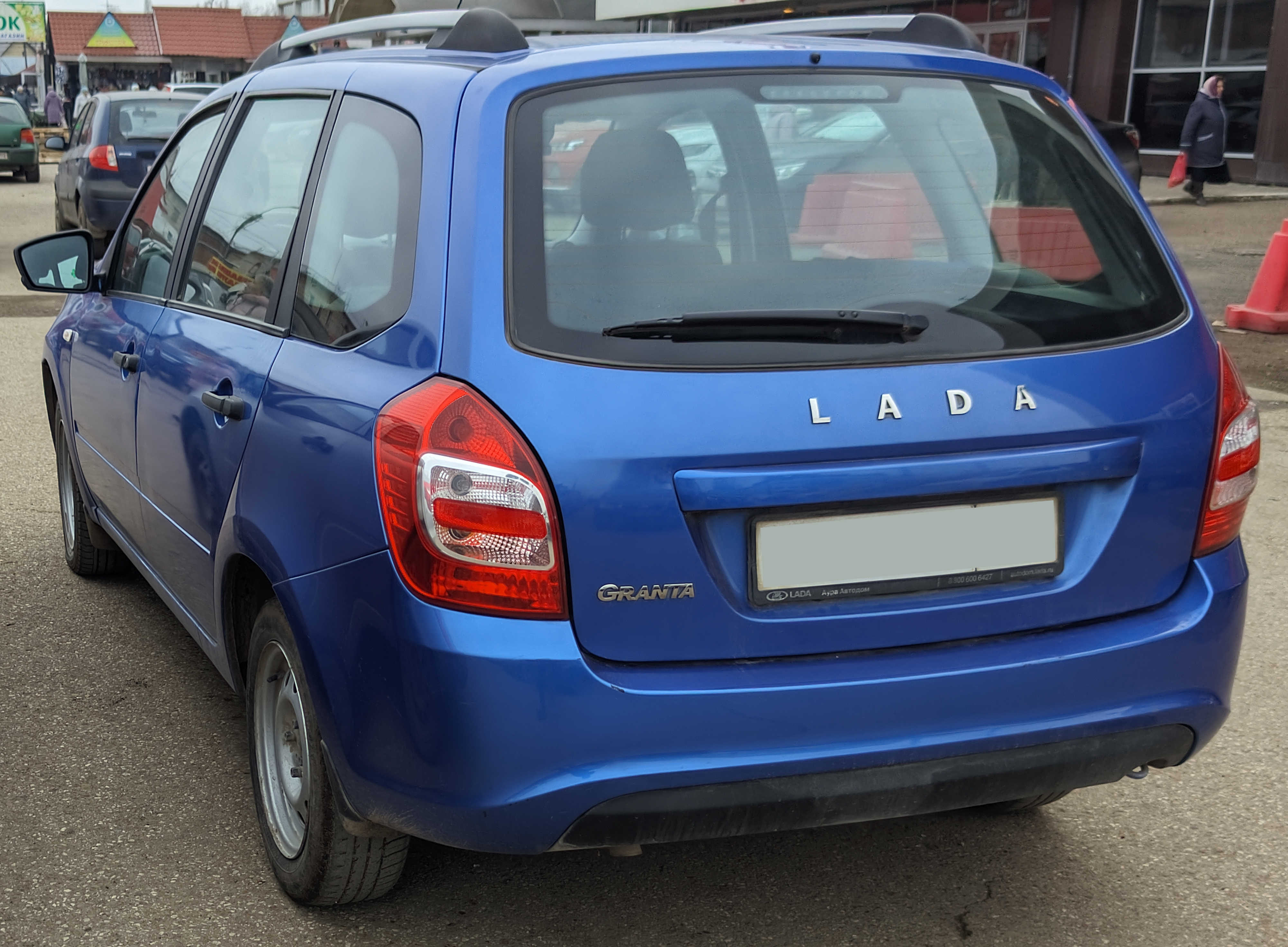
Lada Granta SW (rear view)

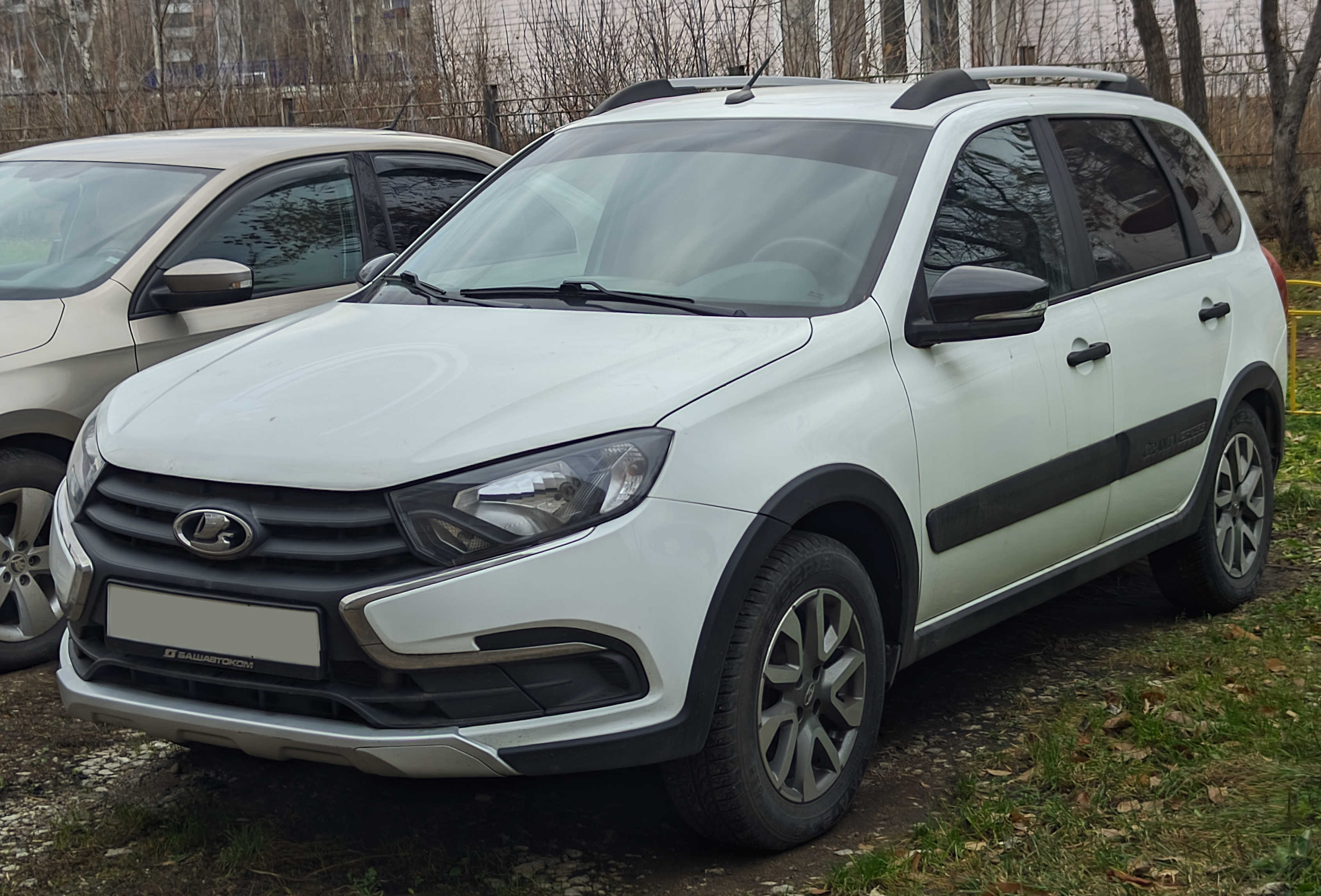
Lada Granta Cross (front view)

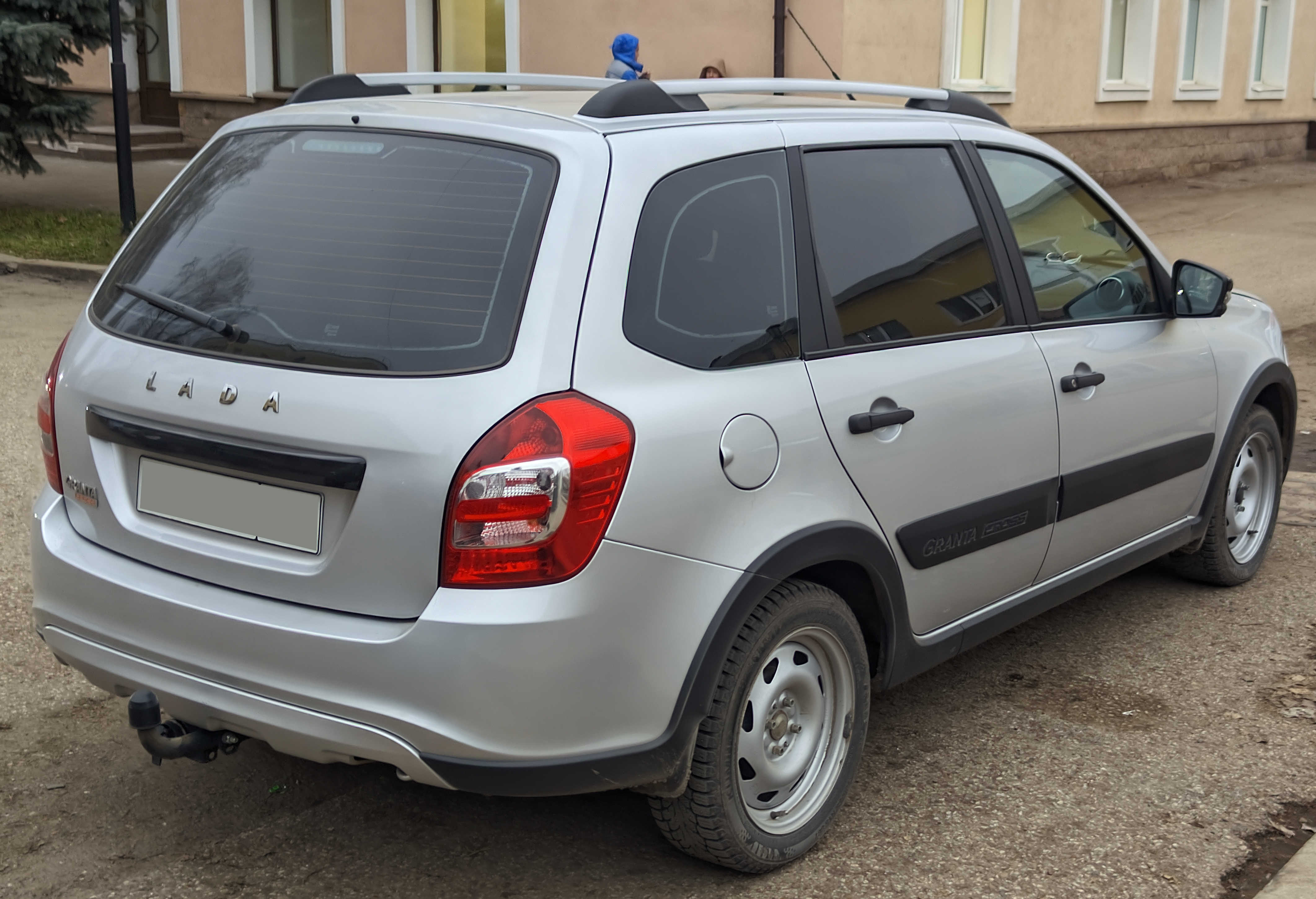
Lada Granta Cross (rear view)

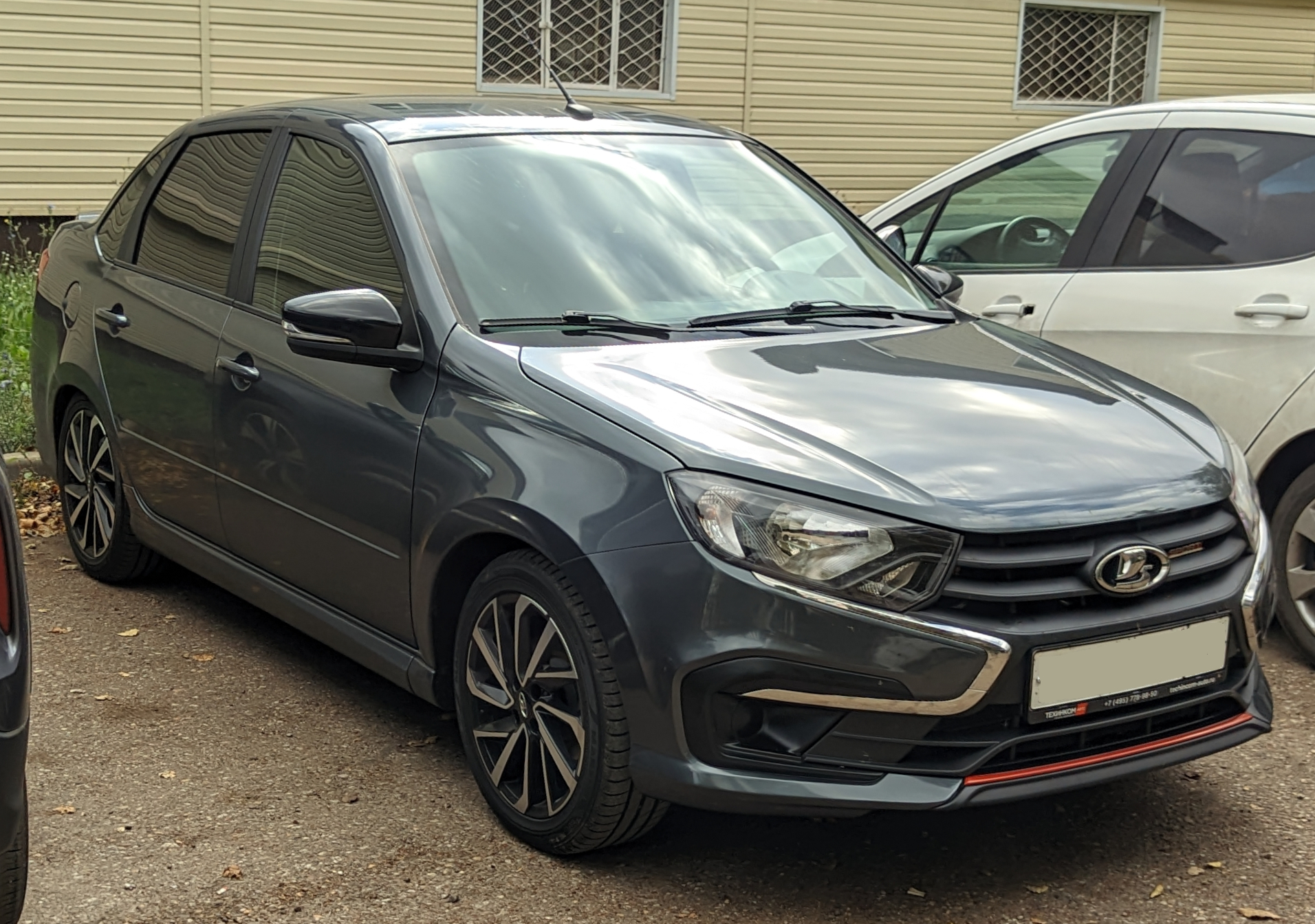
Lada Granta Sport saloon (front view)

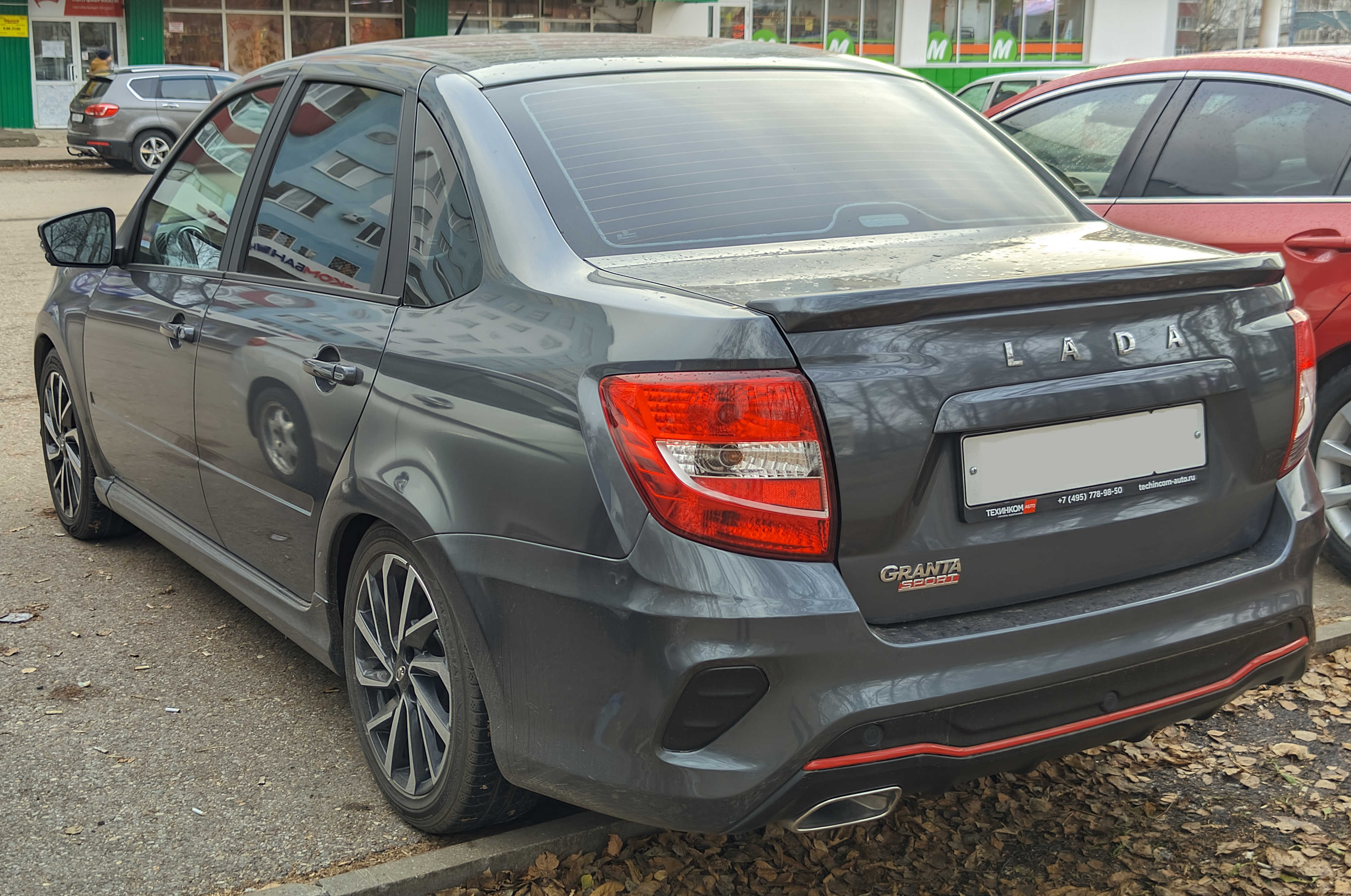
Lada Granta Sport saloon (rear view)

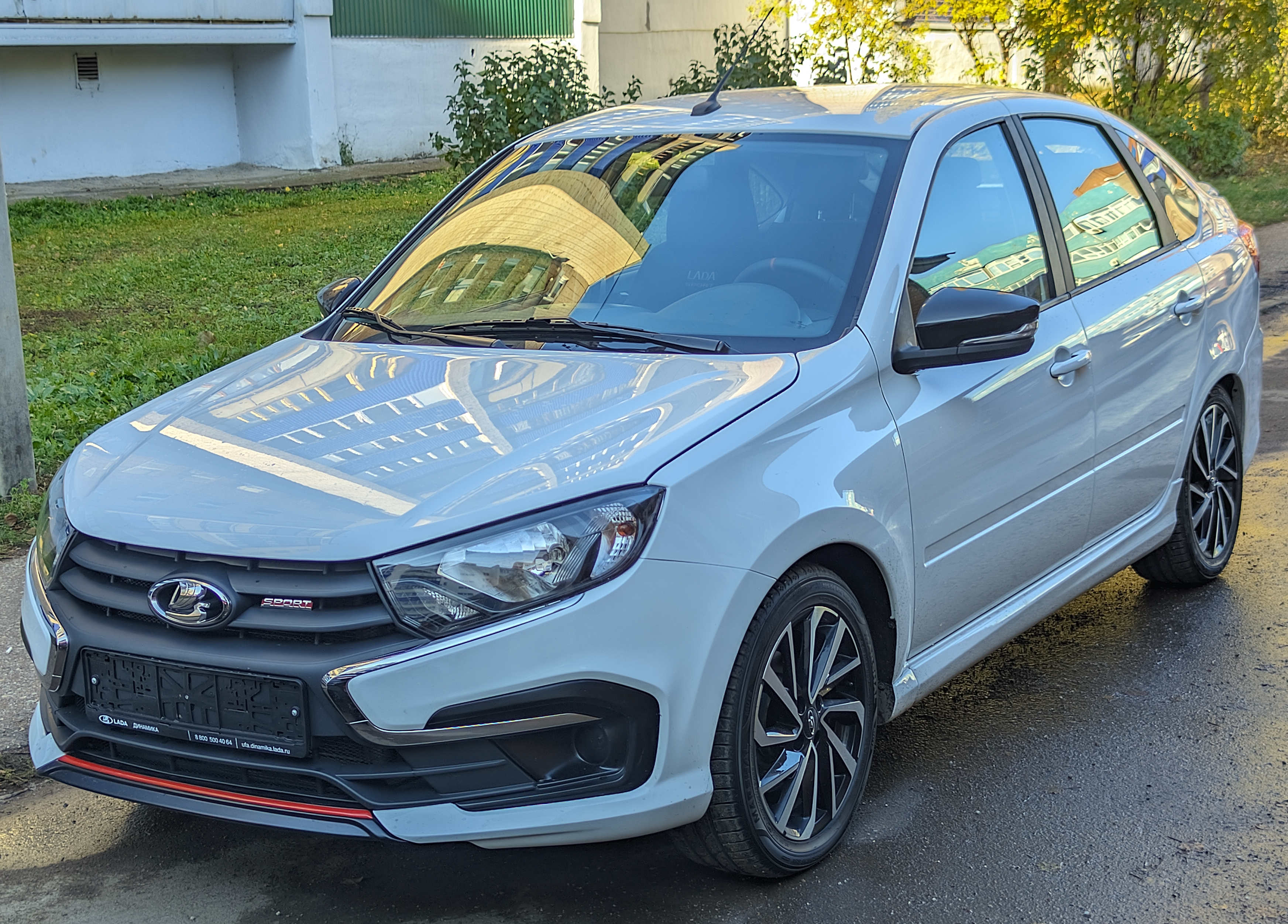
Lada Granta Sport liftback (front view)

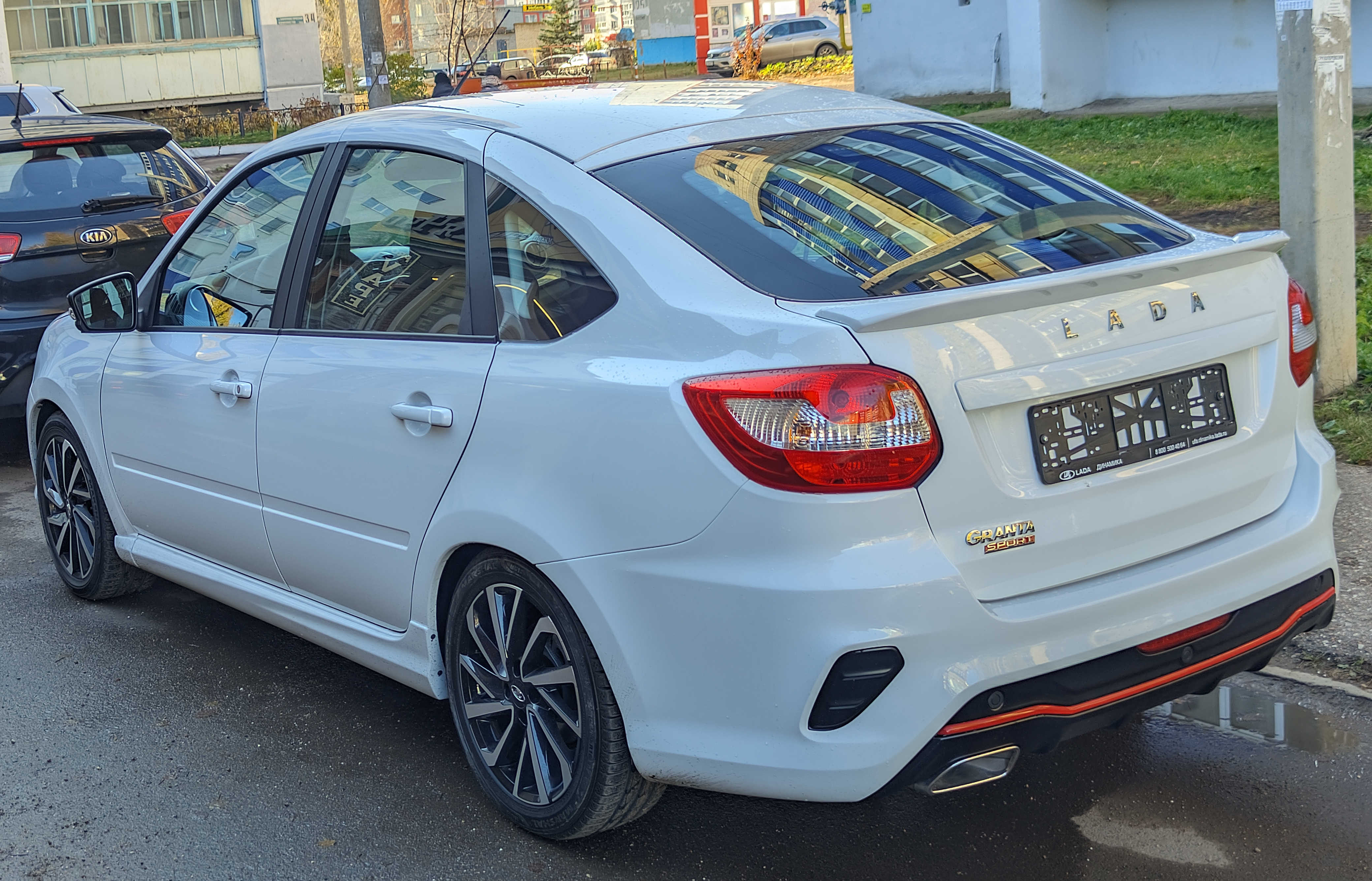
Lada Granta Sport liftback (rear view)

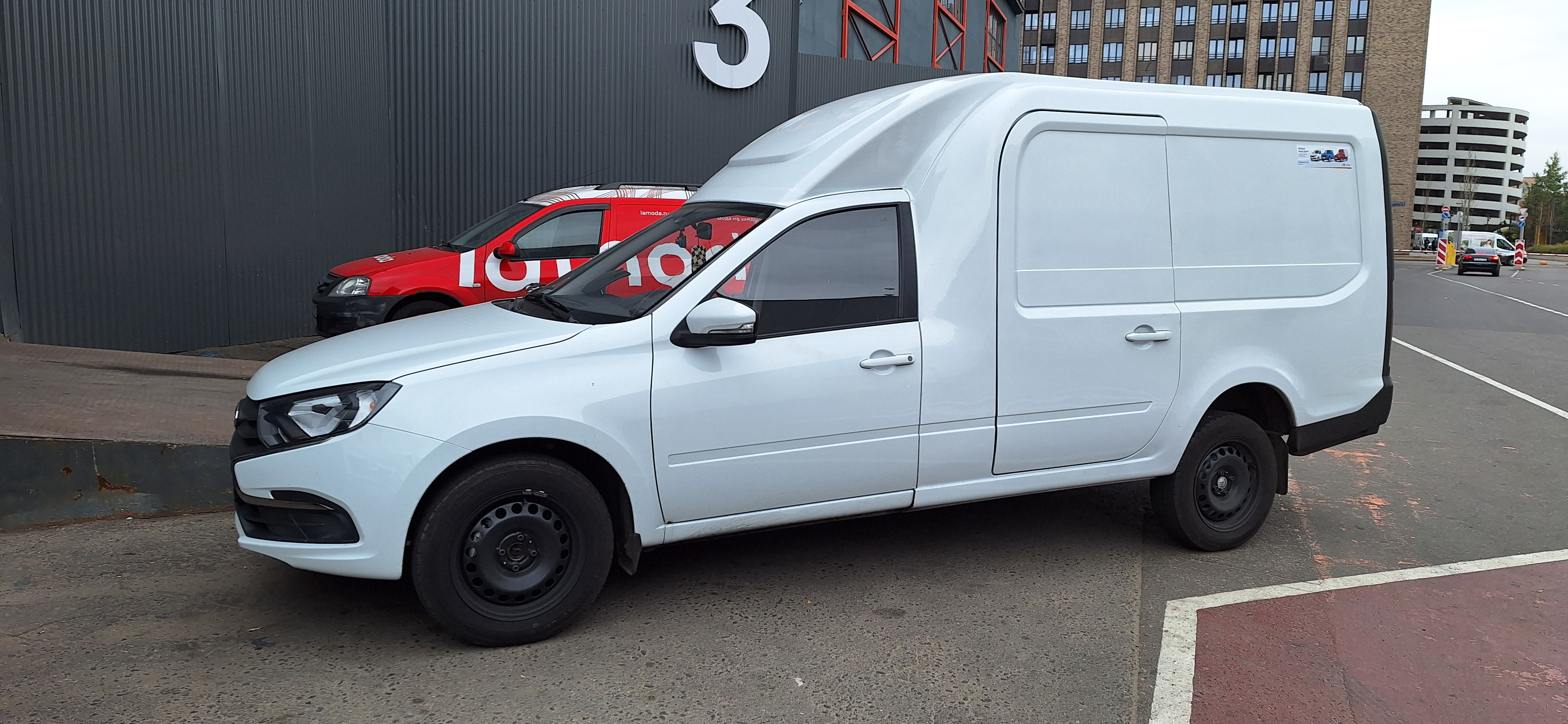
Lada Granta Coub (facelift)

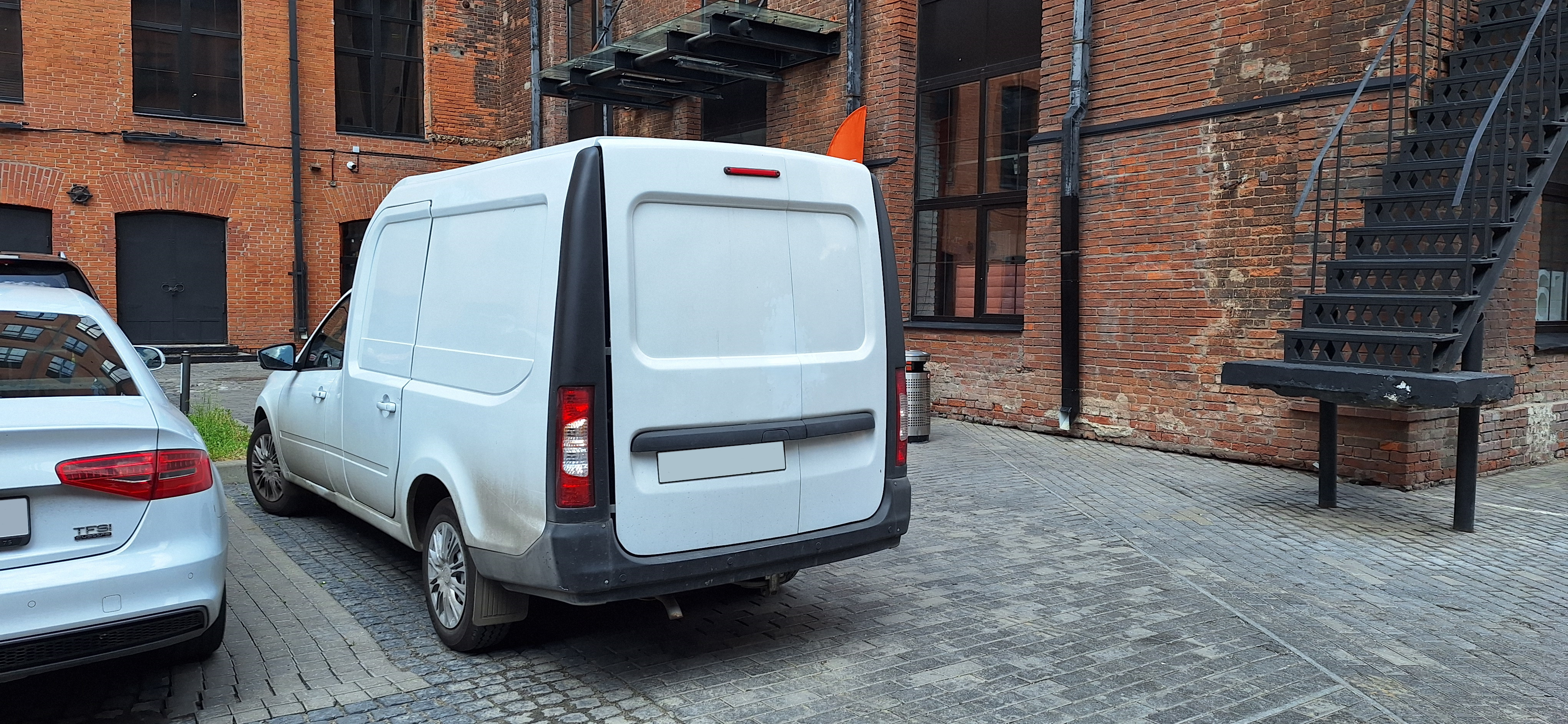
Lada Granta Coub (rear view)

== Production halt ==
Renault ended its collaboration on the Lada Granta when Russia invaded Ukraine in early 2022. When production restarted in June 2022, the Russian-made vehicle did not include airbags, anti-lock brakes, or pollution controls.

Exports to the European Union came to a halt in early 2022 as sanctions were applied to Russia following their invasion of Ukraine.

From August 23, Lada managed to overcome some of the consequences of international sanctions, and resumed production of the Lada Granta equipped with a driver's side airbag.

The Granta Lux earned three stars out of four and 10.5 points out of 16 in a crash test conducted in 2015 by ARCAP. The HIC was 590 for the driver and 428 for the passenger, whereas the compression of the thoracic cavity was measured as 28 mm and 25 mm, respectively. The car was tested with two airbags and seat belt pretensioners.

== Specifications ==
	Standard	Normal	Luxe
Body style	Four-door sedan		
Passengers	5		
Length, mm	4,260		
Width, mm	1,700		
Height, mm	1,500		
Wheelbase, mm	2,476		
Curb weight, kg	1,040 kg (2,293 lb)	1,080 kg (2,381 lb)	1,100 kg (2,425 lb)
Full weight, mm	1,515	1,555	1,575
Max speed, km/h	178 km/h (111 mph)	188 km/h (117 mph)	192 km/h (119 mph) (Manual) / 187 km/h (116 mph) (Auto)

== Related models ==
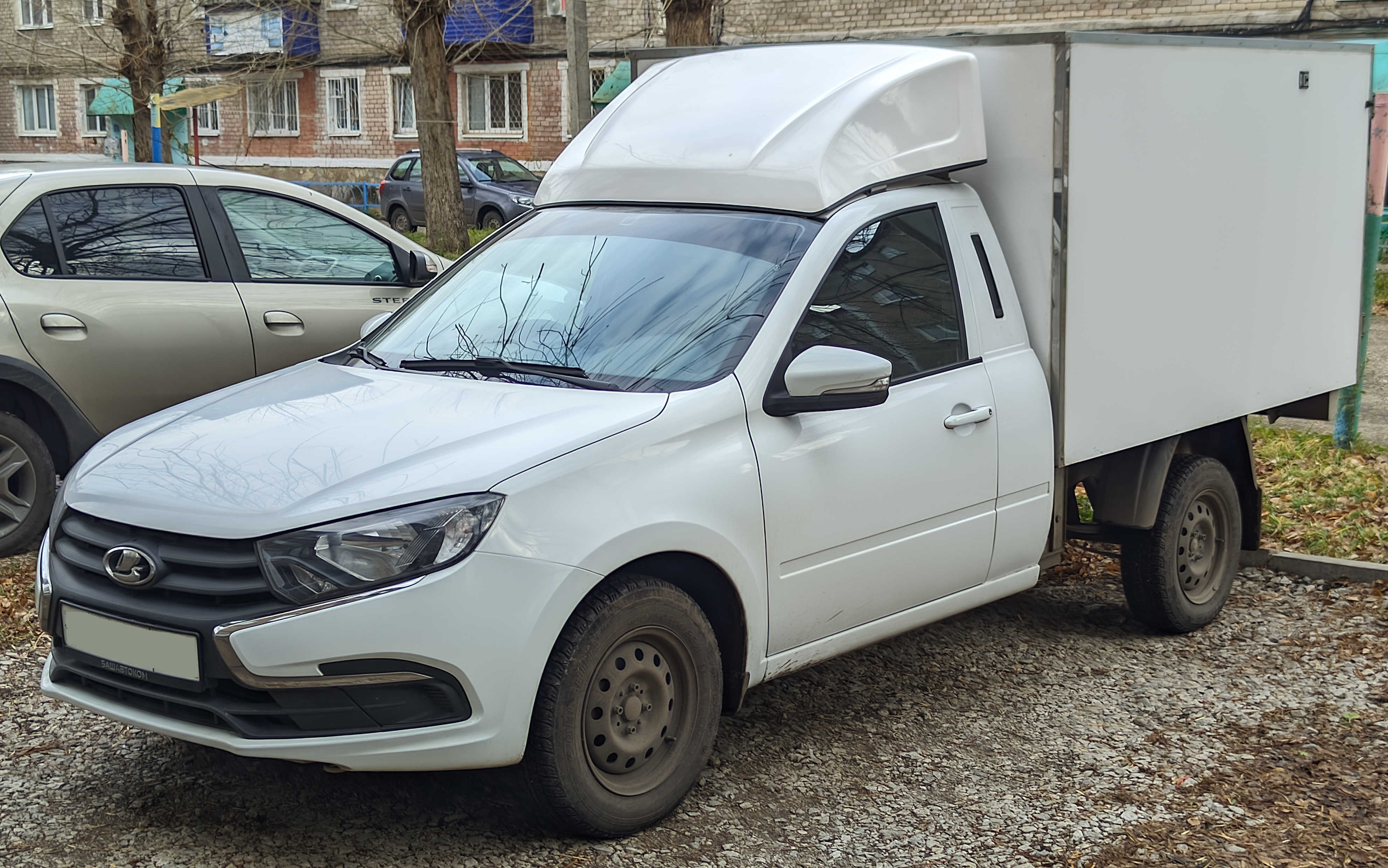
VIS-2349 (facelift)

The AvtoVAZ division VIS-AVTO produces special commercial vans and refrigerated trucks for various purposes on the Lada Granta platform.

== Motorsport ==
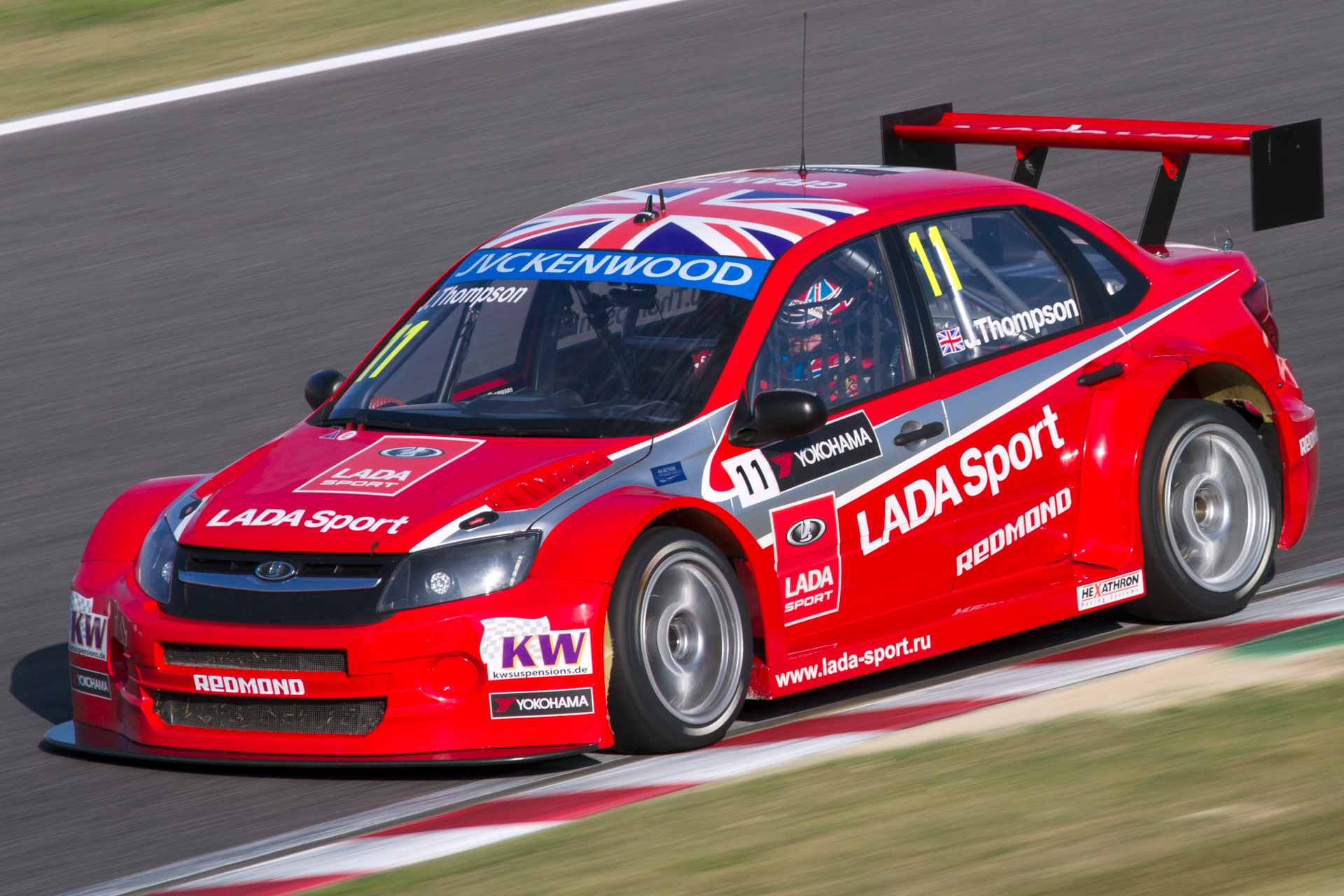
Lada Granta in WTCC Racing

The Lada Granta WTCC competed in the World Touring Car Championship for the 2012 (part-season), 2013 and 2014 seasons. The main driver of the team was James Thompson, while a second car was driven by Aleksey Dudukalo and Mikhail Kozlovskiy. In the 2014 season, Robert Huff, the champion of the 2012 season, also joined the team in a third car. For the 2015 season, the Granta was replaced by the Lada Vesta.

== Replacement ==
In September 2022, company President Maxim Sokolov stated that Lada intends to launch a brand new generation of Lada Granta based on Renault's platform in two or three years' time, including a new crossover. Lada is seeking new suppliers for spare parts and components produced in "friendly" countries.

The second generation of Granta, now called Lada Iskra, will be built on the CMF-B modular platform, its design being inspired by the third generation Dacia Logan.
