= ChechenAvto =

Russian automobile manufacturer

- Industry: Joint-stock company
- Headquarters: Argun, Chechnya, North Caucasus
- Revenue: $41.9 million (2017)
- Operating income: $4,388 (2017)
- Net income: $3,514 (2017)
- Total assets: $5.63 million (2017)
- Total equity: $7,644 (2017)
- Owner: Ministry of Property and Land Relations of the Chechen Republic

ChechenAvto (Chechen: ChechenAuto) (Russian: Чеченавто) is a Chechen automobile manufacturer based in Argun, Chechen Republic. The Company was originally established as a machine-building plant in 1960 and its acquired its current status in 2008. It was known as Pishchemash until 1991, and was part of the Malyshev Factory industrial group.

The first vehicles came out of the plant in 2009, but it was closed the following year for modernization, with production resuming in 2011. The yearly output was initially projected at 50,000 vehicles, but only 6,700 cars were produced in 2016. In 2014 it was reported that cars produced in the plant have a poor reputation for quality, which is said to be lower compared to AvtoVAZ cars manufactured elsewhere.

== Production ==
- Lada Priora
- Lada Granta
- Chaborz M-3 military buggy
