= Autoreview Car Assessment Program =

ARCAP logo

ARCAP (Autoreview Car Assessment Program) is an automobile safety assessment program founded by the Russian car magazine Autoreview. It was Russia's first independent rating for the passive safety of a car, presenting itself as the local edition of the Euro NCAP program. It also provides exclusive test results on some models not marketed in Europe or North America, such as AvtoVAZ vehicles.

== History ==
Since 1996, Autoreview has been conducting independent crash tests for cars sold in the Russian market. The early tests did not comply with international car safety testing methodology. In 2001, the first test was carried out according to the rules of Euro NCAP, though only for frontal impact.

At first the score could deviate from testing norms: in 2002 the VAZ-2110, which would have scored only 0.7 points out of 16 by normal testing criteria, was awarded an additional four points to set it apart from the even less safe Izh Oda and VAZ-2106. For similar reasons it was decided to distinguish between cars with low levels of safety, and cars that in addition to being unsafe were structurally unsound.

In 2017, ARCAP agreed to perform a second crash test on the new UAZ Patriot, after the manufacturer had complained about its methodology following a disappointing rating. The second test ultimately assigned the car a similarly low rating.

== Methodology and ratings ==
According to the results of crash tests (frontal impact of a deformable barrier at 64 km/h with a 40% offset), the car is rated on a scale (0 to 16) following the protocol for the Euro NCAP frontal impact. The score is converted into a star rating, from zero to four stars, that does not coincide with a Euro NCAP rating. By December 2010, over 20 models were assigned a zero-star rating.

Due to a lack of sufficient funds, Euro NCAP standards are applied only in part, as only passive safety is tested, and only for the frontal part of the vehicle. No side crash tests are carried out. Active electronic components such as anti-lock braking systems or electronic stability programs are not considered.

The ratings include symbols for the driver, passenger and car. The car symbol is crossed out in the test result if the impact seriously compromised the structural integrity of the vehicle body. The symbols of the driver and passenger are crossed out where vehicle occupants may be at increased risk of injury to vital organs.

== Test facilities ==
Tests are conducted in the Dmitrovsky District test grounds of the NAMI research institute, and the Laboratory Impact Testing of AvtoVAZ. The Dmitrovsky test grounds near Moscow and AvtoVAZ are the only facilities in Russia to provide access to acceleration catapults and modern Hybrid III dummies, with the equipment required for their calibration. Outside of Russia, ARCAP uses test grounds of the TÜV SÜD subsidiary in the Czech Republic.

== See also ==
- Transport in Russia: Road safety
