= Lo Ka Chun =

Hong Kong racecar driver (born 1977)

Lo Ka Chun 盧家駿
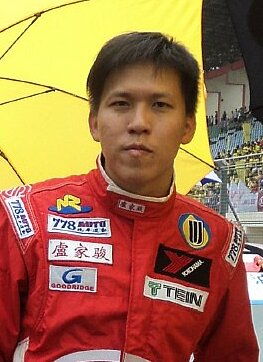
- Lo Ka Chun at Zhuhai International Circuit for the China Touring Car Championship race.
- Nationality: Hong Kong, China
- Born: 11-Nov Hong Kong

Lo Ka Chun (Chinese: 盧家駿) born 11 November in Hong Kong, China is best known as a race driver.

Racing extensively throughout Asia he has won the Asian Touring Car Championship and Chinese Touring Car Championship during his career. He also won the Macau Cup race five times from 2001–2004 and will race in the World Touring Car Championship at Macau in 2011. His car failed scrutineering and was excluded from the event.

== Statistics ==
=== Motor racing record ===
Season	Series	Team/Car	Wins	Final Placing
1999	Asian Touring Car Championship - Independents Trophy	BMW 320i	3	**1st**
1999	Chinese Touring Car Championship	Honda Accord	?	**2nd**
2000	Asian Touring Car Championship - Independents Trophy	Honda Integra	4	**1st**
2002	Asian Touring Car Series	Honda Integra	5	**1st**
2003	Hong Kong Touring Car Championship	Honda Integra	2	**2nd**
2004	Asian Touring Car Series	Honda Integra	3	**1st**
2004	Chinese Touring Car Championship	Honda Integra	4	**2nd**
2005	Chinese Touring Car Championship	Nissan Sunny	2	**2nd**
2006	Chinese Touring Car Championship	Nissan Sunny	2	**1st**
2008	Chinese Touring Car Championship	Kia Cerato	2	4th
2009	Chinese Touring Car Championship	Kia Cerato	1	**3rd**
2009	Hong Kong Touring Car Championship	Honda Integra	2	**1st**
2010	Chinese Touring Car Championship	Kia Forte	1	**3rd**
2010	Hong Kong Touring Car Championship	Honda Civic	4	**2nd**
2011	Chinese Touring Car Championship	Kia Forte	3	**2nd**
2011	World Touring Car Championship	Peugeot 308	0	NC

=== Complete World Touring Car Championship results ===
(key) (Races in bold indicate pole position) (Races in italics indicate fastest lap)

Year	Team	Car	1	2	3	4	5	6	7	8	9	10	11	12	13	14	15	16	17	18	19	20	21	22	23	24	DC	Points
2011	778 Auto Sport	Peugeot 308	BRA; 1	BRA; 2	BEL; 1	BEL; 2	ITA; 1	ITA; 2	HUN; 1	HUN; 2	CZE; 1	CZE; 2	POR; 1	POR; 2	GBR; 1	GBR; 2	GER; 1	GER; 2	ESP; 1	ESP; 2	JPN; 1	JPN; 2	CHN; 1	CHN; 2	MAC; 1 EX	MAC; 2 EX	NC	0
