= Kuok Io Keong =

Macau racing driver

- Nationality: (Macau) Macanese
- Born: 12 April 1965 (age 61) Macau

Kuok Io Keong (郭耀強, born 12 April 1976 in Macau) is best known as a race driver.

He has raced in the Macau and Asian Touring Car Championships and raced for Corsa Motorsport in the final round of the 2011 World Touring Car Championship.

== Career results ==
=== Complete World Touring Car Championship results ===
(key) (Races in bold indicate pole position) (Races in italics indicate fastest lap)

| Year | Team | Car | 1 | 2 | 3 | 4 | 5 | 6 | 7 | 8 | 9 | 10 | 11 | 12 | 13 | 14 | 15 | 16 | 17 | 18 | 19 | 20 | 21 | 22 | 23 | 24 | DC | Points |
|---|---|---|---|---|---|---|---|---|---|---|---|---|---|---|---|---|---|---|---|---|---|---|---|---|---|---|---|---|
| 2011 | Corsa Motorsport | Chevrolet Lacetti | BRA; 1 | BRA; 2 | BEL; 1 | BEL; 2 | ITA; 1 | ITA; 2 | HUN; 1 | HUN; 2 | CZE; 1 | CZE; 2 | POR; 1 | POR; 2 | GBR; 1 | GBR; 2 | GER; 1 | GER; 2 | ESP; 1 | ESP; 2 | JPN; 1 | JPN; 2 | CHN; 1 | CHN; 2 | MAC; 1 DNS | MAC; 2 DNS | **NC** | **0** |

† Season still in progress
