= 2011 World Touring Car Championship =

Motorsport contest

Champions
- World Drivers' Champion: Yvan Muller
- World Manufacturers' Champion: Chevrolet

Seasons
- ← 2010 2012 →

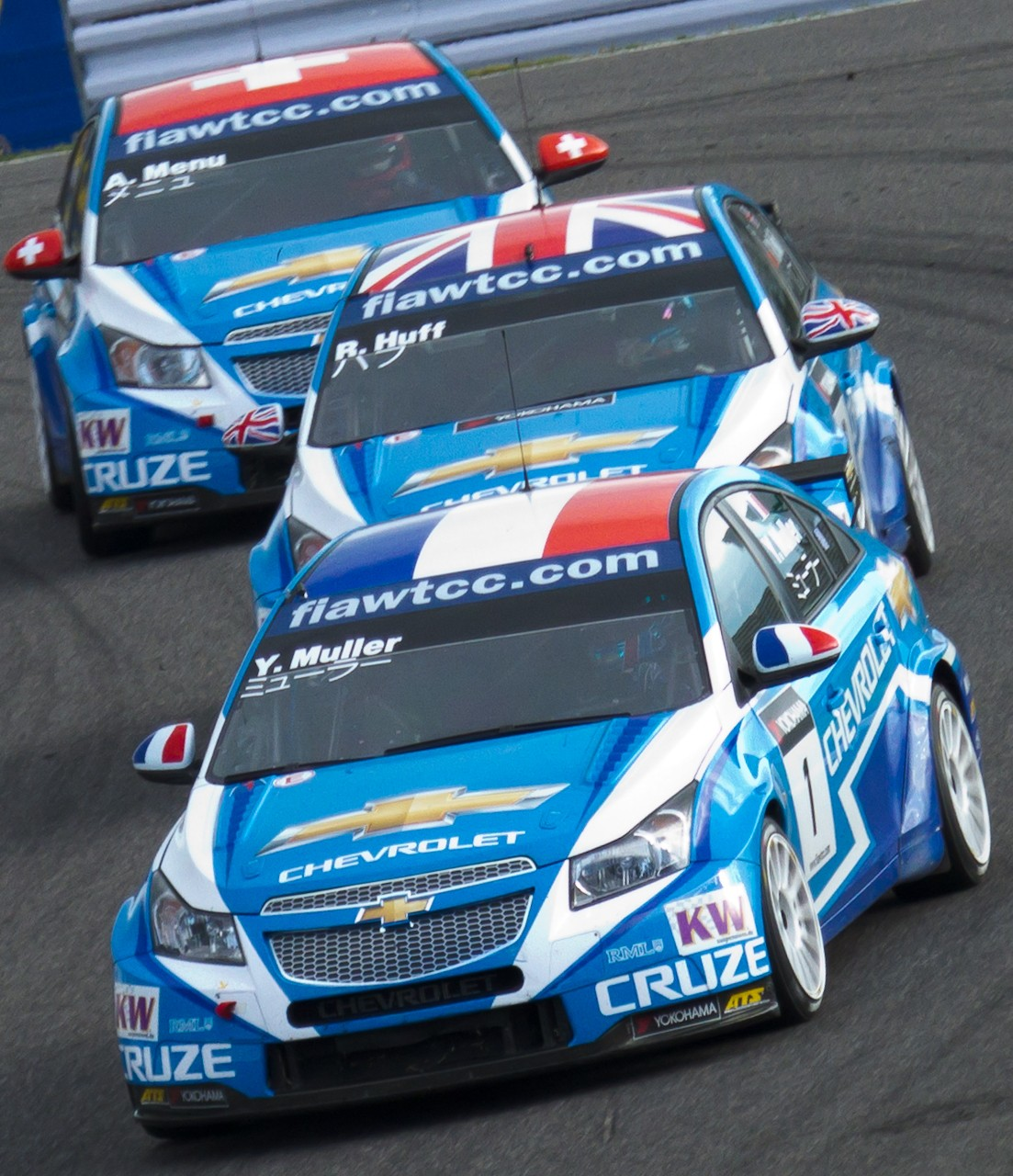
Yvan Muller (front) won his third Drivers' Championship and Chevrolet won the Manufacturers' Championship. The Chevrolet trio (from the front: Muller, Robert Huff and Alain Menu) occupied the top three positions in the Drivers' Championship ranking.

The 2011 World Touring Car Championship season was the eighth season of the FIA World Touring Car Championship, and the seventh since its 2005 return. The championship, which was open to Super 2000 cars and Diesel 2000 cars, began with the Race of Brazil at Curitiba on 20 March and ended with the Guia Race of Macau at the Guia Circuit on 20 November, after twelve events and twenty-four races.

The series underwent major changes with new circuits Suzuka and Tianma coming into the championship, new drivers such as Pepe Oriola to SUNRED Engineering and Robert Dahlgren with Polestar Racing for the whole season. The series lost the FIA Formula Two Championship as a support championship, but it was replaced by Auto GP. It was also supported by a brand new series, European Production Series which supported the six rounds at Zolder, Monza, Brno, Donington, Oschersleben and Valencia.

== Teams and drivers ==
A provisional list of teams and drivers was revealed on 23 February, and the official entry list was published on 4 March.

Team	Car	No.	Drivers	Events
Manufacturer Teams
(United Kingdom) Chevrolet RML	Chevrolet Cruze 1.6T	1	(France) Yvan Muller	All
(United Kingdom) Chevrolet RML	Chevrolet Cruze 1.6T	2	(United Kingdom) Robert Huff	All
(United Kingdom) Chevrolet RML	Chevrolet Cruze 1.6T	6	(Brazil) Carlos 'Cacá' Bueno	1
(United Kingdom) Chevrolet RML	Chevrolet Cruze 1.6T	8	(Switzerland) Alain Menu	All
(Spain) Lukoil – SUNRED	SEAT León 2.0 TDI	3	(Italy) Gabriele Tarquini	1–4
(Spain) Lukoil – SUNRED	SUNRED SR León 1.6T	3	(Italy) Gabriele Tarquini	5–12
(Spain) SUNRED Engineering	SEAT León 2.0 TDI	18	(Portugal) Tiago Monteiro	1–4
(Spain) SUNRED Engineering	SUNRED SR León 1.6T	18	(Portugal) Tiago Monteiro	5–12
(Italy) ROAL Motorsport	BMW 320 TC	15	(Netherlands) Tom Coronel	All
(Sweden) Polestar Racing	Volvo C30	30	(Sweden) Robert Dahlgren	1–4
(Sweden) Polestar Racing	Volvo C30 DRIVe	30	(Sweden) Robert Dahlgren	5–12
Yokohama Trophy
(Spain) Lukoil – SUNRED	SUNRED SR León 1.6T	4	(Russia) Aleksey Dudukalo	7–12
(Switzerland) SEAT Swiss Racing by SUNRED	SUNRED SR León 1.6T	7	(Switzerland) Fredy Barth	4–12
(Spain) SUNRED Engineering	SUNRED SR León 1.6T	17	(Denmark) Michel Nykjær	4–12
(Spain) SUNRED Engineering	SUNRED SR León 1.6T	74	(Spain) Pepe Oriola	4–12
(Hungary) Zengõ-Dension Team	BMW 320 TC	5	(Hungary) Norbert Michelisz	2–12
(Hong Kong) bamboo-engineering	Chevrolet Cruze 1.6T	9	(Hong Kong) Darryl O'Young	2–12
(Hong Kong) bamboo-engineering	Chevrolet Cruze 1.6T	10	(Japan) Yukinori Taniguchi	2–12
(Germany) Liqui Moly Team Engstler	BMW 320 TC	11	(Denmark) Kristian Poulsen	All
(Germany) Liqui Moly Team Engstler	BMW 320 TC	12	(Germany) Franz Engstler	All
(Italy) Proteam Racing	BMW 320 TC	20	(Spain) Javier Villa	All
(Italy) Proteam Racing	BMW 320 TC	25	(Morocco) Mehdi Bennani	All
(Germany) Wiechers-Sport	BMW 320 TC	26	(Italy) Stefano D'Aste	6, 8–9
(Germany) Wiechers-Sport	BMW 320 TC	29	(United Kingdom) Colin Turkington	7, 10–11
(Germany) Wiechers-Sport	BMW 320 TC	35	(Switzerland) Urs Sonderegger	2–5
(Hong Kong) DeTeam KK Motorsport	BMW 320 TC	64	(Russia) David Sigachev	9
(Hong Kong) DeTeam KK Motorsport	BMW 320 TC	65	(Hong Kong) Marchy Lee	1–3
Jay-Ten Trophy
(Spain) Lukoil – SUNRED	SEAT León 2.0 TDI	4	(Russia) Aleksey Dudukalo	1–6
(Switzerland) SEAT Swiss Racing by SUNRED	SEAT León 2.0 TDI	7	(Switzerland) Fredy Barth	1–3
(Spain) SUNRED Engineering	SEAT León 2.0 TDI	17	(Denmark) Michel Nykjær	1–3
(Spain) SUNRED Engineering	SEAT León 2.0 TDI	74	(Spain) Pepe Oriola	1–3
(Hong Kong) bamboo-engineering	Chevrolet Lacetti	9	(Hong Kong) Darryl O'Young	1
(Hong Kong) bamboo-engineering	Chevrolet Lacetti	10	(Japan) Yukinori Taniguchi	1
(Turkey) Borusan Otomotiv Motorsport	BMW 320si	13	(Turkey) Ibrahim Okyay	3, 8
(Italy) Proteam Racing	BMW 320si LCI	21	(Italy) Fabio Fabiani	1–4, 7–10
(Germany) Liqui Moly Team Engstler	BMW 320si LCI	21	(Italy) Fabio Fabiani	11
Asian Wild Card Entries
(Italy) Proteam Racing	BMW 320si LCI	23	(Hong Kong) Philip Ma	11–12
(Germany) Wiechers-Sport	BMW 320 TC	28	(Canada) Gary Kwok	12
(United Kingdom) Chevrolet RML	Chevrolet Cruze 1.6T	31	(Japan) Toshi Arai	10
(Germany) Liqui Moly Team Engstler	BMW 320si LCI	52	(Macau) Jo Merszei	12
(Germany) Liqui Moly Team Engstler	BMW 320si LCI	51	(Hong Kong) Charles Ng	10
(Hong Kong) DeTeam KK Motorsport	BMW 320 TC	51	(Hong Kong) Charles Ng	11–12
(Hong Kong) DeTeam KK Motorsport	BMW 320 TC	68	(Japan) Masaki Kano	10
(Spain) SUNRED Engineering	SUNRED SR León 1.6T	66	(Macau) André Couto	12
(Spain) SUNRED Engineering	SUNRED SR León 1.6T	88	(Japan) Hiroki Yoshimoto	10
(Macau) RPM Racing Team	BMW 320si	70	(Macau) Mak Ka Lok	12
(Hong Kong) Corsa Motorsport	Chevrolet Lacetti	75	(Macau) Felipe De Souza	12
(Hong Kong) Corsa Motorsport	Chevrolet Lacetti	76	(Macau) Kuok Io Keong	12
(Hong Kong) 778 Auto Sport	Peugeot 308	77	(Hong Kong) Lo Ka Chun	12

=== Team and driver changes ===
Chevrolet retained their three full-time drivers from 2010, Yvan Muller, Robert Huff and Alain Menu. Cacá Bueno also joined the team in a fourth car at his home meeting in Curitiba. The team utilized the newly introduced 1,600 cc (98 cu in) engine. Again, two further Chevrolets were entered by bamboo-engineering, who retained their 2010 drivers, Darryl O'Young and Yukinori Taniguchi. Bamboo campaigned Lacettis at the first round in Curitiba, but contested the rest of the season with Cruzes.

SUNRED Engineering again ran six cars through three different team guises. Gabriele Tarquini remained with the team and was joined by former SEAT León Eurocup racer Aleksei Dudukalo, who brought Lukoil sponsorship into the team. Another three-car outfit was headed by Tiago Monteiro, who was joined by Michel Nykjær, and another graduate from the SEAT León Eurocup, Pepe Oriola. Fredy Barth completed the SEAT sextet, with his SEAT Swiss Racing by SUNRED team. The SEATs began the season using a two-litre turbo diesel engine and from Hungary introduced a similar engine to that used in the Chevrolets. However, the cars were branded as SR Leon with no SEAT support at all. Leaving the team is Jordi Gené, who parted with the team before the end of the 2010 season.

Norbert Michelisz remained in the championship with the Zengő Dension Team, but switched to a BMW 320 TC, having campaigned a SEAT in 2010, winning a race at Macau. He began his campaign at the second round of the season at Zolder. Three other teams campaigned a single 320 TC during the season; ROAL Motorsport returned to the series, with Tom Coronel switching from a SUNRED SEAT, Wiechers-Sport ran Urs Sonderegger – another driver from the SEAT León Eurocup – at the European races held during the season, and DeTeam KK Motorsport ran Marchy Lee, who steps up from the Asian Porsche Carrera Cup.

The factory BMW Team RBM did not return in 2011, and drivers Augusto Farfus and Andy Priaulx moved into sportscar racing, entering the Intercontinental Le Mans Cup. Independent BMWs were however campaigned by the Proteam Racing and Liqui Moly Team Engstler outfits. Proteam ran three BMWs; two 320 TCs for Mehdi Bennani, who moves from Wiechers-Sport and former single-seater racer Javier Villa, as well as a naturally aspirated 320si for Fabio Fabiani. Bennani and Villa replaced Independents' champion Sergio Hernández and Stefano D'Aste. Team Engstler ran two cars once again, with Franz Engstler being joined by Kristian Poulsen, who drove for his own team in 2010 after driving for Engstler in 2009. Poulsen replaced Andrei Romanov.

Polestar Racing campaigned a Volvo full-time in 2011, having contested five meetings over the past four seasons. Swedish Touring Car Championship runner-up Robert Dahlgren again campaigned the car as he had done in each of Polestar's events to date. The team also introduced a similar engine in the mid-season.

== Calendar ==
The provisional calendar for the 2011 season was approved by the FIA World Motor Sport Council on 8 September 2010 with further amendments on 3 November 2010, 7 December 2010 and 8 March 2011.

Event		Race Name	Track	Date
1	R1	Race of Brazil	(Brazil) Autódromo Internacional de Curitiba	20 March
1	R2	Race of Brazil	(Brazil) Autódromo Internacional de Curitiba	20 March
2	R3	Monroe Race of Belgium	(Belgium) Circuit Zolder	24 April
2	R4	Monroe Race of Belgium	(Belgium) Circuit Zolder	24 April
3	R5	Race of Italy	(Italy) Autodromo Nazionale di Monza	15 May
3	R6	Race of Italy	(Italy) Autodromo Nazionale di Monza	15 May
4	R7	Race of Hungary	(Hungary) Hungaroring	5 June
4	R8	Race of Hungary	(Hungary) Hungaroring	5 June
5	R9	Monroe Race of the Czech Republic	(Czech Republic) Masaryk Circuit	19 June
5	R10	Monroe Race of the Czech Republic	(Czech Republic) Masaryk Circuit	19 June
6	R11	Race of Turismo de Portugal	(Portugal) Circuito da Boavista	3 July
6	R12	Race of Turismo de Portugal	(Portugal) Circuito da Boavista	3 July
7	R13	Race of UK	(United Kingdom) Donington Park	17 July
7	R14	Race of UK	(United Kingdom) Donington Park	17 July
8	R15	bet-at-home.com Race of Germany	(Germany) Motorsport Arena Oschersleben	31 July
8	R16	bet-at-home.com Race of Germany	(Germany) Motorsport Arena Oschersleben	31 July
9	R17	interwetten.com Race of Spain	(Spain) Circuit Ricardo Tormo	4 September
9	R18	interwetten.com Race of Spain	(Spain) Circuit Ricardo Tormo	4 September
10	R19	Kenwood Race of Japan	(Japan) Suzuka Circuit	23 October
10	R20	Kenwood Race of Japan	(Japan) Suzuka Circuit	23 October
11	R21	Race of China	(China) Shanghai Tianma Circuit	6 November
11	R22	Race of China	(China) Shanghai Tianma Circuit	6 November
12	R23	Race of Macau	(Macau) Guia Circuit	20 November
12	R24	Race of Macau	(Macau) Guia Circuit	20 November

=== Calendar changes ===
- The Race of Brazil was going to move from Curitiba to Interlagos. The move was reverted due to logistical issues connected to renovation at Interlagos in regards to safety in the Subida dos Boxes area, which has been the site of touring car fatalities.
- The Race of China will be held for the first time. It was originally scheduled to be held at the Guangdong International Circuit, but was later relocated to the Tianma Circuit.
- The Race of Portugal returned to Porto as in recent odd years.
- The Race of Japan moved from Okayama to Suzuka.
- The Race of UK moved from Brands Hatch to Donington Park.
- The Race of Argentina was originally scheduled to be held in Buenos Aires, but was dropped from the calendar and replaced with the Race of Belgium when the circuit failed its homologation and it was found that there would not be enough time to complete the work necessary to upgrade the circuit to the required standard.
- The Race of Morocco was dropped from the calendar, and replaced by the new Race of Hungary.

== Results and standings ==
=== Races ===
Race	Race Name	Pole Position	Fastest lap	Winning driver	Winning team	Yokohama winner	Jay-Ten Winner	Report
1	Race of Brazil	(United Kingdom) Robert Huff	(United Kingdom) Robert Huff	(United Kingdom) Robert Huff	(United Kingdom) Chevrolet	(Denmark) Kristian Poulsen	(Denmark) Michel Nykjær	Report
2	Race of Brazil		(United Kingdom) Robert Huff	(Switzerland) Alain Menu	(United Kingdom) Chevrolet	(Spain) Javier Villa	(Spain) Pepe Oriola	Report
3	Race of Belgium	(United Kingdom) Robert Huff	(United Kingdom) Robert Huff	(United Kingdom) Robert Huff	(United Kingdom) Chevrolet	(Denmark) Kristian Poulsen	(Denmark) Michel Nykjær	Report
4	Race of Belgium		(Spain) Javier Villa	(Italy) Gabriele Tarquini	(Spain) Lukoil – SUNRED	(China) Darryl O'Young	(Denmark) Michel Nykjær	Report
5	Race of Italy	(United Kingdom) Robert Huff	(France) Yvan Muller	(United Kingdom) Robert Huff	(United Kingdom) Chevrolet	(Hungary) Norbert Michelisz	(Switzerland) Fredy Barth	Report
6	Race of Italy		(France) Yvan Muller	(United Kingdom) Robert Huff	(United Kingdom) Chevrolet	(Denmark) Kristian Poulsen	(Spain) Pepe Oriola	Report
7	Race of Hungary	(Switzerland) Alain Menu	(Hungary) Norbert Michelisz	(Switzerland) Alain Menu	(United Kingdom) Chevrolet	(Hungary) Norbert Michelisz	(Russia) Aleksei Dudukalo	Report
8	Race of Hungary		(Hungary) Norbert Michelisz	(France) Yvan Muller	(United Kingdom) Chevrolet	(Germany) Franz Engstler	(Russia) Aleksei Dudukalo	Report
9	Race of the Czech Republic	(France) Yvan Muller	(United Kingdom) Robert Huff	(United Kingdom) Robert Huff	(United Kingdom) Chevrolet	(Denmark) Kristian Poulsen	(Russia) Aleksei Dudukalo	Report
10	Race of the Czech Republic		(France) Yvan Muller	(France) Yvan Muller	(United Kingdom) Chevrolet	(Denmark) Michel Nykjær	(Russia) Aleksei Dudukalo	Report
11	Race of Portugal	(Switzerland) Alain Menu	(Switzerland) Alain Menu	(Switzerland) Alain Menu	(United Kingdom) Chevrolet	(Hungary) Norbert Michelisz	no finishers	Report
12	Race of Portugal		(United Kingdom) Robert Huff	(United Kingdom) Robert Huff	(United Kingdom) Chevrolet	(Hungary) Norbert Michelisz	(Russia) Aleksei Dudukalo	Report
13	(United Kingdom) Race of UK	(France) Yvan Muller	(United Kingdom) Robert Huff	(France) Yvan Muller	(United Kingdom) Chevrolet	(Germany) Franz Engstler	no finishers	Report
14	(United Kingdom) Race of UK		(France) Yvan Muller	(France) Yvan Muller	(United Kingdom) Chevrolet	(Germany) Franz Engstler	no finishers	Report
15	Race of Germany	(France) Yvan Muller	(United Kingdom) Robert Huff	(France) Yvan Muller	(United Kingdom) Chevrolet	(Italy) Stefano D'Aste	(Turkey) Ibrahim Okyay	Report
16	Race of Germany		(Netherlands) Tom Coronel	(Germany) Franz Engstler	(Germany) Liqui Moly Team Engstler	(Germany) Franz Engstler	(Turkey) Ibrahim Okyay	Report
17	Race of Spain	(France) Yvan Muller	(France) Yvan Muller	(France) Yvan Muller	(United Kingdom) Chevrolet	(Denmark) Kristian Poulsen	(Italy) Fabio Fabiani	Report
18	Race of Spain		(France) Yvan Muller	(France) Yvan Muller	(United Kingdom) Chevrolet	(Denmark) Kristian Poulsen	(Italy) Fabio Fabiani	Report
19	Race of Japan	(Switzerland) Alain Menu	(Switzerland) Alain Menu	(Switzerland) Alain Menu	(United Kingdom) Chevrolet	(Denmark) Michel Nykjær	(Hong Kong) Charles Ng	Report
20	Race of Japan		(Sweden) Robert Dahlgren	(Netherlands) Tom Coronel	(Italy) ROAL Motorsport	(Denmark) Michel Nykjær	(Hong Kong) Charles Ng	Report
21	Race of China	(Switzerland) Alain Menu	(United Kingdom) Robert Huff	(Switzerland) Alain Menu	(United Kingdom) Chevrolet	(United Kingdom) Colin Turkington	(Italy) Fabio Fabiani	Report
22	Race of China		(France) Yvan Muller	(France) Yvan Muller	(United Kingdom) Chevrolet	(United Kingdom) Colin Turkington	(Italy) Fabio Fabiani	Report
23	Guia Race of Macau	(United Kingdom) Robert Huff	(France) Yvan Muller	(United Kingdom) Robert Huff	(United Kingdom) Chevrolet	(Denmark) Michel Nykjær	(Macau) Jo Merszei	Report
24	Guia Race of Macau		(United Kingdom) Robert Huff	(United Kingdom) Robert Huff	(United Kingdom) Chevrolet	(Denmark) Michel Nykjær	(Macau) Jo Merszei	Report

== Championship standings ==
Points system
**1st**	**2nd**	**3rd**	**4th**	**5th**	**6th**	**7th**	**8th**	**9th**	**10th**
25	18	15	12	10	8	6	4	2	1

=== Drivers' Championship ===
Pos	Driver	BRA (Brazil)		BEL (Belgium)		ITA (Italy)		HUN (Hungary)		CZE (Czech Republic)		POR (Portugal)		GBR (United Kingdom)		GER (Germany)		ESP (Spain)		JPN (Japan)		CHN (China)		MAC (Macau)		Pts
1	(France) Yvan Muller	2	3	3	Ret	2	2	5	1	**2**	1	2	2	**1**	1	**1**	5	**1**	1	4	2	4	1	2	3	433
2	(United Kingdom) Robert Huff	**1**	4	**1**	6	**1**	1	4	2	1	4	3	1	2	2	2	6	5	2	2	3	3	**3**	**1**	1	430
3	(Switzerland) Alain Menu	6	**1**	2	2	19†	5	**1**	Ret	3	3	**1**	6	3	5	5	2	2	3	**1**	4	**1**	6	Ret	DNS	323
4	(Netherlands) Tom Coronel	4	2	Ret	DNS	5	15	18†	4	4	2	6	5	4	**4**	10	4	3	7	NC	1	5	5	4	2	233
5	(Italy) Gabriele Tarquini	7	6	4	1	Ret	10	6	3	NC	6	5	7	5	7	3	3	17†	4	9	Ret	NC	2	3	4	204
6	(Portugal) Tiago Monteiro	11	7	5	3	3	**4**	7	5	12	12	4	3	Ret	Ret	Ret	8	8	Ret	Ret	DNS	8	Ret	12	8	117
7	(Denmark) Kristian Poulsen	5	14	6	Ret	6	3	9	Ret	5	8	14	19	9	17†	13	Ret	4	5	5	10	6	7	7	13	112
8	(Germany) Franz Engstler	9	9	Ret	12	9	9	15	6	16	Ret	11	8	6	3	16	**1**	NC	**10**	10	11	12	8	6	**7**	88
9	(Hungary) Norbert Michelisz			7	8	4	7	2	15	8	15	8	4	NC	12	15	Ret	7	6	15	9	11	Ret	8	9	88
10	(Denmark) Michel Nykjær	8	Ret	8	5	12	Ret	13	13†	10	**5**	9	12	7	Ret	7	17	11	15	3	6	14	14	5	5	86
11	(Sweden) Robert Dahlgren	12	13	13	7	15	13	NC	9	6	9	7	16	8	6	4	7	9	9	Ret	5	9	9	DNS	DNS	72
12	(Spain) Javier Villa	14	8	9	10	8	8	3	7	9	7	Ret	17	17	16	12	10	6	19†	16	8	10	Ret	11	10	59
13	(United Kingdom) Colin Turkington													10	10					6	7	2	4			46
14	(Hong Kong) Darryl O'Young	Ret	11	10	4	7	6	12	8	7	Ret	12	9	11	8	14	11	15	14	11	**Ret**	13	Ret	Ret	12	43
15	(Brazil) Cacá Bueno	3	5																							25
16	(Morocco) Mehdi Bennani	10	Ret	Ret	11	11	20†	14	**14**	11	10	16	18	14	9	11	Ret	Ret	12	8	18	7	11	9	6	24
17	(Italy) Stefano D'Aste											10	**11**			6	9	10	11							12
18	(Spain) Pepe Oriola	13	10	11	14	14	12	10	Ret	13	11	13	14	12	15	8	12	12	8	18	13	17	13	10	11	11
19	(Switzerland) Fredy Barth	15	Ret	Ret	**DNS**	10	19†	8	10	Ret	16†	NC	10	13	11	NC	Ret	19	18†	Ret	DNS	21	12	DNS	DNS	7
20	(Japan) Yukinori Taniguchi	18	15	14	DSQ	13	11	11	11	15	14	15	15	16	13	17	14	14	16	7	14	20†	DNS	WD	WD	6
21	(Russia) Aleksei Dudukalo	17	12	12	9	Ret	Ret	16	12	14	13	Ret	13	15	14	9	15	13	Ret	17	12	15	17	Ret	DNS	4
22	(Hong Kong) Charles Ng																			14	19	16	10	13	14	1
	(Japan) Masaki Kano																			12	16					0
	(Japan) Toshi Arai																			13	15					0
	(Italy) Fabio Fabiani	19	NC	16	13	18	18	17	Ret					DSQ	DSQ	19	16	16	17	DNQ	DNQ	18	15			0
	(Turkey) Ibrahim Okyay					16	16									18	13									0
	(Russia) David Sigachev																	18†	13							0
	(Macau) Jo Merszei																							14	15	0
	(Hong Kong) Marchy Lee	16	16	Ret	DNS	20	14																			0
	(Switzerland) Urs Sonderegger			15	15†	17	17	DNS	DNS	17	Ret															0
	(Macau) Felipe De Souza																							15†	Ret	0
	(Hong Kong) Philip Ma																					19	16†	Ret	16	0
	(Canada) Gary Kwok																							16†	Ret	0
	(Japan) Hiroki Yoshimoto																			Ret	17					0
	(Macau) Mak Ka Lok																							Ret	Ret	0
	(Macau) André Couto																							Ret	Ret	0
	(Macau) Kuok Io Keong																							DNS	DNS	0
	(Hong Kong) Lo Ka Chun																							EX	EX	0
Pos	Driver	BRA (Brazil)		BEL (Belgium)		ITA (Italy)		HUN (Hungary)		CZE (Czech Republic)		POR (Portugal)		GBR (United Kingdom)		GER (Germany)		ESP (Spain)		JPN (Japan)		CHN (China)		MAC (Macau)		Pts

Colour	Result
Gold	Winner
Silver	Second place
Bronze	Third place
Green	Points classification
Blue	Non-points classification
Blue	Non-classified finish (NC)
Purple	Retired, not classified (Ret)
Red	Did not qualify (DNQ)
Red	Did not pre-qualify (DNPQ)
Black	Disqualified (DSQ)
White	Did not start (DNS)
White	Withdrew (WD)
White	Race cancelled (C)
Blank	Did not practice (DNP)
Blank	Did not arrive (DNA)
Blank	Excluded (EX)

**Bold** – Pole
Italics – Fastest Lap

† — Drivers did not finish the race, but were classified as they completed over 90% of the race distance.

Drivers Championship points were awarded on a 25–18–15–12–10–8–6–4–2–1 basis for the first ten places in each race.

=== Manufacturers' Championship ===
Pos	Manufacturer	BRA (Brazil)		BEL (Belgium)		ITA (Italy)		HUN (Hungary)		CZE (Czech Republic)		POR (Portugal)		GBR (United Kingdom)		GER (Germany)		ESP (Spain)		JPN (Japan)		CHN (China)		MAC (Macau)		Pts
1	(United States) Chevrolet	1	1	1	2	1	1	1	1	1	1	1	1	1	1	1	2	1	1	1	2	1	1	1	1	973
1	(United States) Chevrolet	2	3	2	4	2	2	4	2	2	3	2	2	2	2	2	5	2	2	2	3	3	3	2	3	973
2	(Germany) BMW	4	2	6	8	4	3	2	4	4	2	6	4	4	3	6	1	3	5	5	1	2	4	4	2	583
2	(Germany) BMW	5	8	7	10	5	7	3	6	5	7	8	5	6	4	10	4	4	6	6	7	5	5	6	6	583
3	(Spain) SEAT	7	6	4	1	3	4	6	3	10	5	4	3	5	7	3	3	8	4	3	6	8	2	3	4	522
3	(Spain) SEAT	8	7	5	3	10	10	7	5	12	6	5	7	7	11	7	8	11	8	9	12	14	12	5	5	522
4	(Sweden) Volvo	12	13	13	7	15	13	NC	9	6	9	7	16	8	6	4	7	9	9	Ret	5	9	9	DNS	DNS	154
Pos	Manufacturer	BRA (Brazil)		BEL (Belgium)		ITA (Italy)		HUN (Hungary)		CZE (Czech Republic)		POR (Portugal)		GBR (United Kingdom)		GER (Germany)		ESP (Spain)		JPN (Japan)		CHN (China)		MAC (Macau)		Pts

Manufacturers Championship points were awarded on a 25–18–15–12–10–8–6–4–2–1 basis for the first ten places in each race. However, only the results obtained by the best two cars classified per manufacturer in each race were counted. All the other cars of that same manufacturer were invisible as far as scoring points is concerned.

=== Yokohama Drivers' Trophy ===
Pos	Driver	BRA (Brazil)		BEL (Belgium)		ITA (Italy)		HUN (Hungary)		CZE (Czech Republic)		POR (Portugal)		GBR (United Kingdom)		GER (Germany)		ESP (Spain)		JPN (Japan)		CHN (China)		MAC (Macau)		Pts
1	(Denmark) Kristian Poulsen	5	14	**6**	Ret	6	3	9	Ret	**5**	8	14	19	9	17	13	Ret	4	5	5	10	6	7	7	13	141
2	(Denmark) Michel Nykjær	**8**	**Ret**	8	5	12	Ret	13	13	10	**5**	9	12	7	**Ret**	7	17	11	15	**3**	6	14	14	5	5	139
3	(Germany) Franz Engstler	9	9	Ret	12	9	9	15	6	16	Ret	11	8	6	3	16	**1**	NC	**10**	10	11	12	8	6	7	125
4	(Hungary) Norbert Michelisz			7	8	**4**	7	2	15	8	15	**8**	4	NC	12	**15**	Ret	**7**	6	15	9	11	Ret	8	9	124
5	(Spain) Javier Villa	14	8	9	10	8	8	**3**	7	9	7	Ret	17	17	16	12	10	6	19	16	8	10	Ret	11	10	104
6	(Hong Kong) Darryl O'Young	Ret	11	10	4	7	6	12	8	7	Ret	12	9	11	8	14	11	15	14	11	Ret	13	Ret	**Ret**	12	88
7	(Morocco) Mehdi Bennani	10	Ret	Ret	11	11	**20**	14	**14**	11	10	16	18	14	9	11	Ret	Ret	12	8	18	7	11	9	6	73
8	(Spain) Pepe Oriola	13	10	11	14	14	12	10	Ret	13	11	13	14	12	15	8	12	12	8	18	13	17	13	10	11	66
9	(United Kingdom) Colin Turkington													**10**	10					6	7	**2**	4			49
10	(Italy) Stefano D'Aste											10	**11**			6	9	10	11							37
11	(Russia) Aleksei Dudukalo	17	12	12	9	Ret	Ret	16	12	14	13	Ret	13	15	14	9	15	13	Ret	17	12	15	17	Ret	DNS	31
12	(Switzerland) Fredy Barth	15	Ret	Ret	**DNS**	10	19	8	10	Ret	16	NC	10	13	11	NC	Ret	19	18	Ret	DNS	21	**12**	DNS	DNS	30
13	(Japan) Yukinori Taniguchi	18	15	14	DSQ	13	11	11	11	15	14	15	15	16	13	17	14	14	16	7	14	20	DNS	WD	WD	26
14	(Hong Kong) Charles Ng																			14	19	16	10	13	14	7
15	(Turkey) Ibrahim Okyay					16	16									18	13									3
16	(Hong Kong) Marchy Lee	16	16	Ret	DNS	20	14																			3
17	(Russia) David Sigachev																	18	13							2
18	(Japan) Masaki Kano																			12	16					1
19	(Italy) Fabio Fabiani	19	NC	16	13	18	18	17	Ret					DSQ	DSQ	19	16	16	17	DNQ	DNQ	18	15			1
	(Macau) Jo Merszei																							14	15	0
	(Switzerland) Urs Sonderegger			15	15	17	17	DNS	DNS	17	Ret															0
	(Macau) Felipe De Souza																							15	Ret	0
	(Hong Kong) Philip Ma																					19	16	Ret	16	0
	(Canada) Gary Kwok																							16	Ret	0
	(Japan) Hiroki Yoshimoto																			Ret	17					0
	(Macau) Mak Ka Lok																							Ret	Ret	0
	(Macau) Kuok Io Keong																							DNS	DNS	0
	(Hong Kong) Lo Ka Chun																							EX	EX	0
Pos	Driver	BRA (Brazil)		BEL (Belgium)		ITA (Italy)		HUN (Hungary)		CZE (Czech Republic)		POR (Portugal)		GBR (United Kingdom)		GER (Germany)		ESP (Spain)		JPN (Japan)		CHN (China)		MAC (Macau)		Pts

Colour	Result
Gold	Winner
Silver	Second place
Bronze	Third place
Green	Points classification
Blue	Non-points classification
Blue	Non-classified finish (NC)
Purple	Retired, not classified (Ret)
Red	Did not qualify (DNQ)
Red	Did not pre-qualify (DNPQ)
Black	Disqualified (DSQ)
White	Did not start (DNS)
White	Withdrew (WD)
White	Race cancelled (C)
Blank	Did not practice (DNP)
Blank	Did not arrive (DNA)
Blank	Excluded (EX)

**Bold** – Pole
Italics – Fastest Lap

=== Yokohama Teams' Trophy ===
Pos	Team	BRA (Brazil)		BEL (Belgium)		ITA (Italy)		HUN (Hungary)		CZE (Czech Republic)		POR (Portugal)		GBR (United Kingdom)		GER (Germany)		ESP (Spain)		JPN (Japan)		CHN (China)		MAC (Macau)		Pts
1	(Germany) Liqui Moly Team Engstler	5	9	6	12	6	3	9	6	5	8	11	8	6	3	13	1	4	5	5	10	6	7	6	7	259
1	(Germany) Liqui Moly Team Engstler	9	14	Ret	Ret	9	9	15	Ret	16	Ret	14	19	9	17	16	Ret	NC	10	10	11	12	8	7	13	259
2	(Spain) SUNRED Engineering	8	10	8	5	12	12	10	13	10	5	9	11	7	15	7	12	11	8	3	6	14	13	5	5	200
2	(Spain) SUNRED Engineering	13	Ret	11	14	14	Ret	13	Ret	13	11	13	14	12	Ret	8	17	12	15	18	13	17	14	10	11	200
3	(Italy) Proteam Racing	10	8	9	10	8	8	3	7	9	7	16	17	14	9	11	10	6	12	8	8	7	11	9	6	172
3	(Italy) Proteam Racing	14	NC	16	11	11	18	14	14	11	10	Ret	18	17	16	12	16	16	17	16	18	10	15	11	10	172
4	(Hungary) Zengő-Dension Team			7	8	4	7	2	15	8	15	8	4	NC	12	15	Ret	7	6	15	9	11	Ret	8	9	113
5	(United Kingdom) bamboo-engineering	18	11	10	4	7	6	11	8	7	14	12	9	11	8	14	11	14	14	7	14	13	Ret	Ret	12	112
5	(United Kingdom) bamboo-engineering	Ret	15	14	DSQ	13	11	12	11	15	Ret	15	15	16	13	17	14	15	16	11	Ret	20	DNS	WD	WD	112
6	(Germany) Wiechers-Sport			15	15	17	17	DNS	DNS	17	Ret	10	11	10	10	6	9	10	11	6	7	2	4	16	Ret	81
7	(Spain) Lukoil – SUNRED	17	12	12	9	Ret	Ret	16	12	14	13	Ret	13	15	14	9	15	13	Ret	17	12	15	17	Ret	DNS	31
8	(Switzerland) SEAT Swiss Racing by SUNRED	15	Ret	Ret	DNS	10	19	8	10	Ret	16	NC	10	13	11	NC	Ret	19	18	Ret	DNS	21	12	DNS	DNS	30
9	(Hong Kong) DeTeam KK Motorsport	16	16	Ret	DNS	20	14											18	13	12	16	16	10	13	14	13
10	(Turkey) Borusan Otomotiv Motorsport					16	16									18	13									3
	(Hong Kong) Corsa Motorsport																							15	Ret	0
	(Hong Kong) Corsa Motorsport																							DNS	DNS	0
	(Macau) RPM Racing Team																							Ret	Ret	0
	(Hong Kong) 778 Auto Sport																							EX	EX	0
Pos	Team	BRA (Brazil)		BEL (Belgium)		ITA (Italy)		HUN (Hungary)		CZE (Czech Republic)		POR (Portugal)		GBR (United Kingdom)		GER (Germany)		ESP (Spain)		JPN (Japan)		CHN (China)		MAC (Macau)		Pts

Colour	Result
Gold	Winner
Silver	Second place
Bronze	Third place
Green	Points classification
Blue	Non-points classification
Blue	Non-classified finish (NC)
Purple	Retired, not classified (Ret)
Red	Did not qualify (DNQ)
Red	Did not pre-qualify (DNPQ)
Black	Disqualified (DSQ)
White	Did not start (DNS)
White	Withdrew (WD)
White	Race cancelled (C)
Blank	Did not practice (DNP)
Blank	Did not arrive (DNA)
Blank	Excluded (EX)

=== Jay-Ten Trophy ===
Pos	Driver	BRA (Brazil)		BEL (Belgium)		ITA (Italy)		HUN (Hungary)		CZE (Czech Republic)		POR (Portugal)		GBR (United Kingdom)		GER (Germany)		ESP (Spain)		JPN (Japan)		CHN (China)		MAC (Macau)		Pts
1	(Italy) Fabio Fabiani	19	NC	16	13	18	18	17	Ret					DSQ	DSQ	19	16	16	17	DNQ	DNQ	18	15			88
2	(Russia) Aleksei Dudukalo	17	12	12	9	Ret	Ret	16	12	14	13	Ret	13													75
3	(Spain) Pepe Oriola	13	10	11	14	14	12																			47
4	(Denmark) Michel Nykjær	8	Ret	8	5	12	Ret																			38
5	(Turkey) Ibrahim Okyay					16	16									18	13									33
6	(Hong Kong) Philip Ma																					19	16	Ret	16	24
7	(Switzerland) Fredy Barth	15	Ret	Ret	DNS	10	19																			21
8	(Macau) Jo Merszei																							14	15	20
9	(Hong Kong) Charles Ng																			14	19					20
10	(Japan) Yukinori Taniguchi	18	15																							9
11	(Hong Kong) Darryl O'Young	Ret	11																							8
12	(Macau) Felipe De Souza																							15	Ret	8
	(Macau) Mak Ka Lok																							Ret	Ret	0
	(Macau) Kuok Io Keong																							DNS	DNS	0
	(Hong Kong) Lo Ka Chun																							EX	EX	0
Pos	Driver	BRA (Brazil)		BEL (Belgium)		ITA (Italy)		HUN (Hungary)		CZE (Czech Republic)		POR (Portugal)		GBR (United Kingdom)		GER (Germany)		ESP (Spain)		JPN (Japan)		CHN (China)		MAC (Macau)		Pts
