= 2011 FIA WTCC Race of Italy =

Race details
- Round 3 of 12 in the 2011 World Touring Car Championship at Autodromo Nazionale di Monza in Monza, Italy.
- Date: 15 May, 2011
- Location: Monza, Italy
- Course: Autodromo Nazionale di Monza; 5.793 kilometres (3.600 mi)

Race One
- Laps: 9
Pole position
Driver		(United Kingdom) Robert Huff	Chevrolet RML
Time		1:59.034	
Podium
First		(United Kingdom) Robert Huff	Chevrolet RML
Second		(France) Yvan Muller	Chevrolet RML
Third		(Portugal) Tiago Monteiro	SUNRED Engineering
Fastest Lap
Driver		(France) Yvan Muller	Chevrolet RML
Time		1:59.960	

Race Two
- Laps: 9
Podium
First		(United Kingdom) Robert Huff	Chevrolet RML
Second		(France) Yvan Muller	Chevrolet RML
Third		(Denmark) Kristian Poulsen	Liqui Moly Team Engstler
Fastest Lap
Driver		(France) Yvan Muller	Chevrolet RML
Time		1:59.355	

The 2011 FIA WTCC Race of Italy was the third round of the 2011 World Touring Car Championship season and the seventh running of the FIA WTCC Race of Italy. It was held on 15 May 2011 at the Autodromo Nazionale di Monza in Monza, Italy.

Both races were won by Robert Huff of Chevrolet RML. Kristian Poulsen claimed his maiden WTCC podium finish in race two when he finished third.

== Background ==
After the previous round in Belgium, Huff was leading the drivers' championship by one point over Chevrolet team mate Alain Menu. Poulsen was leading the Yokohama Independents' Trophy.

Turkish driver Ibrahim Okyay returned to championship driving a Borusan Otomotiv Motorsport run naturally aspirated BMW 320si, having last competed in the 2008 season.

== Report ==
=== Testing and free practice ===
Yvan Muller set the pace in Thursday's opening test session, beating the BMWs of Poulsen and Tom Coronel. SUNRED Engineering did not take part in the session having run their own private test the previous day.

Huff topped the opening free practice session on Saturday morning, a tenth quicker than the SEAT of Gabriele Tarquini. Franz Engstler ended up in the gravel trap at the parabolica during the session.

Muller led a Chevrolet 1–2–3–4 in the final free practice session, leading Huff, Menu and the independent Chevrolet Cruze of Darryl O'Young. Marchy Lee lost control of his DeTeam KK Motorsport BMW 320 TC at Lesmo and collided with the barriers, while Mehdi Bennani spun himself into the gravel at the same corner.

=== Qualifying ===
Huff continued his dominance of qualifying in 2011 to take his third pole position of the season, edging out team–mates Muller and Menu to lead a Chevrolet 1–2–3. Huff set his best lap in Q1 after the checkered flag fell, putting him ninth and into the second session. Tiago Monteiro was tenth in Q1 to take pole position for race two.

Muller set the pace at the start of Q2 but Huff went quickest on his first flying lap. Behind the Chevrolet trio, Michelisz lined up fourth alongside Menu on the second row as the leading independent driver. Monteiro, O'Young, Poulsen, Coronel, Bennani and Tarquini completed the top ten. Tarquini was taken to the medical centre for checks after the session when the left window in his car shattered.

=== Warm-Up ===
Warm–up took place on a damp track on Sunday morning, pole sitter Huff set the fastest time. Some drivers found the conditions tricky and took the first corner escape road, while Monteiro was called to the stewards' office for cutting a corner in sector three on his best lap.

=== Race One ===
Huff had led from pole position and was followed by Muller and Menu. A gap left by Muller towards the end of the first lap allowed Menu to take second place and the Swiss driver then set about catching the leader. Later on in the race, Muller was catching Menu and on the last lap the pair collided. Muller tagged Menu's car sending the second placed car into one of the barriers on the final lap. This left the last podium position open, Michelisz was running third but Monteiro got a better run through the last corner and by the line, Monteiro came out three–hundredths of a second ahead. Huff, Muller and Monteiro filled the podium places with Michelisz fourth as the winning independent and Coronel fifth. Yokohama Trophy leader Poulsen was sixth. The Lukoil-SUNRED pair of Tarquini and Aleksei Dudukalo were the only retirements.

=== Race Two ===
Monteiro started on the reversed grid pole but race one winner Huff passed him at the start to lead into the first corner. He was followed by Muller, who later bumped into the rear of Huff's car under braking for the Parabolica. The contact meant Huff got out of shape but stayed on track. Muller was shown the bad sportsmanship flag after the incident. Huff and Muller made it a Chevrolet 1–2 for both races and Poulsen took third and his first podium finish in the WTCC, Coronel had been in contention for the position until he slowed with a delaminated tyre. Monteiro ended up fourth and Menu was fifth having started the race from the back. Coronel ended the race fifteenth.

After the race, Muller was given a ten–place grid penalty, suspended for two rounds for causing the collision with Huff.

== Results ==
=== Qualifying ===
Pos.	No.	Name	Team	Car	C	Q1	Q2
1	2	(United Kingdom) Robert Huff	Chevrolet RML	Chevrolet Cruze 1.6T		2:00.515	1:59.034
2	1	(France) Yvan Muller	Chevrolet RML	Chevrolet Cruze 1.6T		2:00.382	1:59.131
3	8	(Switzerland) Alain Menu	Chevrolet RML	Chevrolet Cruze 1.6T		2:00.279	1:59.433
4	5	(Hungary) Norbert Michelisz	Zengő-Dension Team	BMW 320 TC	Y	1:59.961	1:59.458
5	18	(Portugal) Tiago Monteiro	SUNRED Engineering	SEAT León 2.0 TDI		2:00.549	1:59.574
6	9	(Hong Kong) Darryl O'Young	bamboo-engineering	Chevrolet Cruze 1.6T	Y	2:00.030	1:59.866
7	11	(Denmark) Kristian Poulsen	Liqui Moly Team Engstler	BMW 320 TC	Y	2:00.005	2:00.010
8	15	(Netherlands) Tom Coronel	ROAL Motorsport	BMW 320 TC		1:59.907	2:00.244
9	25	(Morocco) Mehdi Bennani	Proteam Racing	BMW 320 TC	Y	2:00.287	2:00.930
10	3	(Italy) Gabriele Tarquini	Lukoil-SUNRED	SEAT León 2.0 TDI		2:00.511	2:01.073
11	20	(Spain) Javier Villa	Proteam Racing	BMW 320 TC	Y	2:00.803	
12	74	(Spain) Pepe Oriola	SUNRED Engineering	SEAT León 2.0 TDI	Y	2:00.861	
13	12	(Germany) Franz Engstler	Liqui Moly Team Engstler	BMW 320 TC	Y	2:00.912	
14	17	(Denmark) Michel Nykjær	SUNRED Engineering	SEAT León 2.0 TDI	Y	2:00.971	
15	10	(Japan) Yukinori Taniguchi	bamboo-engineering	Chevrolet Cruze 1.6T	Y	2:01.534	
16	30	(Sweden) Robert Dahlgren	Polestar Racing	Volvo C30		2:01.823	
17	7	(Switzerland) Fredy Barth	SEAT Swiss Racing by SUNRED	SEAT León 2.0 TDI	Y	2:02.008	
18	4	(Russia) Aleksei Dudukalo	Lukoil-SUNRED	SEAT León 2.0 TDI	Y	2:02.009	
19	65	(Hong Kong) Marchy Lee	DeTeam KK Motorsport	BMW 320 TC	Y	2:04.088	
20	35	(Switzerland) Urs Sonderegger	Wiechers-Sport	BMW 320 TC	Y	2:04.682	
21	13	(Turkey) Ibrahim Okyay	Borusan Otomotiv Motorsport	BMW 320si	Y	2:04.790	
22	21	(Italy) Fabio Fabiani	Proteam Racing	BMW 320si	Y	2:08.789	

=== Race 1 ===
Pos.	No.	Name	Team	Car	C	Laps	Time/Retired	Grid	Points
1	2	(United Kingdom) Robert Huff	Chevrolet RML	Chevrolet Cruze 1.6T		9	18:07.398	1	25
2	1	(France) **Yvan Muller**	Chevrolet RML	Chevrolet Cruze 1.6T		9	+1.291	2	18
3	18	(Portugal) Tiago Monteiro	SUNRED Engineering	SEAT León 2.0 TDI		9	+4.239	5	15
4	5	(Hungary) Norbert Michelisz	Zengő-Dension Team	BMW 320 TC	Y	9	+4.269	4	12
5	15	(Netherlands) Tom Coronel	ROAL Motorsport	BMW 320 TC		9	+4.499	8	10
6	11	(Denmark) Kristian Poulsen	Liqui Moly Team Engstler	BMW 320 TC	Y	9	+5.509	7	8
7	9	(Hong Kong) Darryl O'Young	bamboo-engineering	Chevrolet Cruze 1.6T	Y	9	+10.506	6	6
8	20	(Spain) Javier Villa	Proteam Racing	BMW 320 TC	Y	9	+10.798	11	4
9	12	(Germany) Franz Engstler	Liqui Moly Team Engstler	BMW 320 TC	Y	9	+11.492	13	2
10	7	(Switzerland) Fredy Barth	SEAT Swiss Racing by SUNRED	SEAT León 2.0 TDI	Y	9	+15.366	17	1
11	25	(Morocco) Mehdi Bennani	Proteam Racing	BMW 320 TC	Y	9	+18.439	9	
12	17	(Denmark) Michel Nykjær	SUNRED Engineering	SEAT León 2.0 TDI	Y	9	+18.873	14	
13	10	(Japan) Yukinori Taniguchi	bamboo-engineering	Chevrolet Cruze 1.6T	Y	9	+19.286	15	
14	74	(Spain) Pepe Oriola	SUNRED Engineering	SEAT León 2.0 TDI	Y	9	+20.070	12	
15	30	(Sweden) Robert Dahlgren	Polestar Racing	Volvo C30		9	+30.709	16	
16	13	(Turkey) Ibrahim Okyay	Borusan Otomotiv Motorsport	BMW 320si	Y	9	+58.046	21	
17	35	(Switzerland) Urs Sonderegger	Wiechers-Sport	BMW 320 TC	Y	9	+59.018	20	
18	21	(Italy) Fabio Fabiani	Proteam Racing	BMW 320si	Y	9	+1:25.422	22	
19	8	(Switzerland) Alain Menu	Chevrolet RML	Chevrolet Cruze 1.6T		8	+1 Lap	3	
20	65	(Hong Kong) Marchy Lee	DeTeam KK Motorsport	BMW 320 TC	Y	8	+1 Lap	19	
Ret	3	(Italy) Gabriele Tarquini	Lukoil-SUNRED	SEAT León 2.0 TDI		5	Race incident	10	
Ret	4	(Russia) Aleksei Dudukalo	Lukoil-SUNRED	SEAT León 2.0 TDI	Y	2	Race incident	18	

- **Bold** denotes Fastest lap.

=== Race 2 ===
Pos.	No.	Name	Team	Car	C	Laps	Time/Retired	Grid	Points
1	2	(United Kingdom) Robert Huff	Chevrolet RML	Chevrolet Cruze 1.6T		9	18:10.032	2	25
2	1	(France) **Yvan Muller**	Chevrolet RML	Chevrolet Cruze 1.6T		9	+0.242	4	18
3	11	(Denmark) Kristian Poulsen	Liqui Moly Team Engstler	BMW 320 TC	Y	9	+3.559	8	15
4	18	(Portugal) Tiago Monteiro	SUNRED Engineering	SEAT León 2.0 TDI		9	+6.211	1	12
5	8	(Switzerland) Alain Menu	Chevrolet RML	Chevrolet Cruze 1.6T		9	+8.896	6	10
6	9	(Hong Kong) Darryl O'Young	bamboo-engineering	Chevrolet Cruze 1.6T	Y	9	+10.089	7	8
7	5	(Hungary) Norbert Michelisz	Zengő-Dension Team	BMW 320 TC	Y	9	+10.780	9	6
8	20	(Spain) Javier Villa	Proteam Racing	BMW 320 TC	Y	9	+11.054	11	4
9	12	(Germany) Franz Engstler	Liqui Moly Team Engstler	BMW 320 TC	Y	9	+11.056	13	2
10	3	(Italy) Gabriele Tarquini	Lukoil-SUNRED	SEAT León 2.0 TDI		9	+12.800	3	1
11	10	(Japan) Yukinori Taniguchi	bamboo-engineering	Chevrolet Cruze 1.6T	Y	9	+19.420	15	
12	74	(Spain) Pepe Oriola	SUNRED Engineering	SEAT León 2.0 TDI	Y	9	+21.519	12	
13	30	(Sweden) Robert Dahlgren	Polestar Racing	Volvo C30		9	+23.532	16	
14	65	(Hong Kong) Marchy Lee	DeTeam KK Motorsport	BMW 320 TC	Y	9	+27.912	19	
15	15	(Netherlands) Tom Coronel	ROAL Motorsport	BMW 320 TC		9	+28.095	10	
16	13	(Turkey) Ibrahim Okyay	Borusan Otomotiv Motorsport	BMW 320si	Y	9	+48.069	21	
17	35	(Switzerland) Urs Sonderegger	Wiechers-Sport	BMW 320 TC	Y	9	+52.972	20	
18	21	(Italy) Fabio Fabiani	Proteam Racing	BMW 320si	Y	9	+1:27.890	22	
19	7	(Switzerland) Fredy Barth	SEAT Swiss Racing by SUNRED	SEAT León 2.0 TDI	Y	7	+2 Laps	17	
20	25	(Morocco) Mehdi Bennani	Proteam Racing	BMW 320 TC	Y	7	+2 Laps	5	
Ret	4	(Russia) Aleksei Dudukalo	Lukoil-SUNRED	SEAT León 2.0 TDI	Y	1	Race incident	18	
DNS	17	(Denmark) Michel Nykjær	SUNRED Engineering	SEAT León 2.0 TDI	Y	0	Did not start	14	

- **Bold** denotes Fastest lap.

== Standings after the event ==
Drivers' Championship standings

	Pos	Driver	Points
	1	(United Kingdom) Robert Huff	120
2	2	(France) Yvan Muller	84
1	3	(Switzerland) Alain Menu	79
1	4	(Portugal) Tiago Monteiro	58
2	5	(Italy) Gabriele Tarquini	52

Yokohama Independents' Trophy standings

	Pos	Driver	Points
	1	(Denmark) Kristian Poulsen	45
4	2	(Hungary) Norbert Michelisz	33
1	3	(Hong Kong) Darryl O'Young	33
2	4	(Spain) Javier Villa	33
2	5	(Denmark) Michel Nykjær	24

Manufacturers' Championship standings

Pos	Manufacturer	Points
1	(United States) Chevrolet	242
2	(Spain) SR Customer Racing	150
3	(Germany) BMW Customer Racing Teams	132
4	(Sweden) Volvo Polestar Evaluation Team	40

- Note: Only the top five positions are included for both sets of drivers' standings.
