= 2011 FIA WTCC Race of Portugal =

Race details
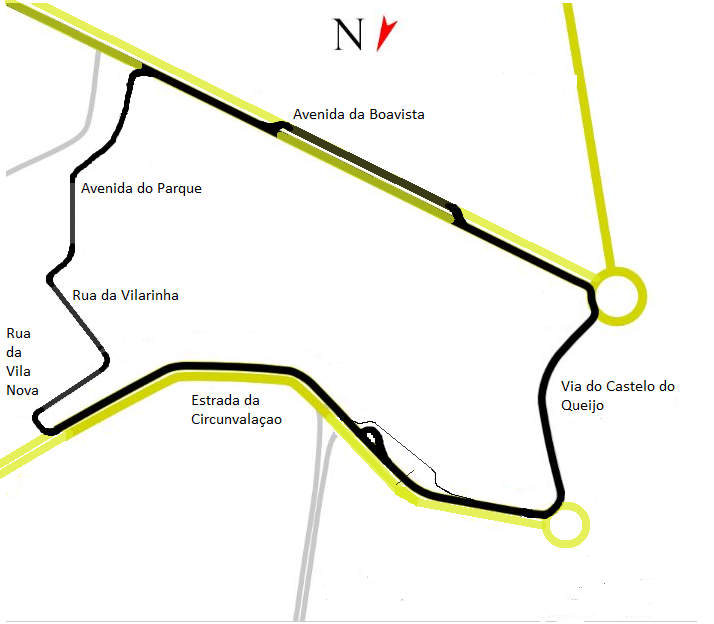
- Round 6 of 12 in the 2011 World Touring Car Championship at Circuito da Boavista in Porto, Portugal.
- Date: 3 July, 2011
- Location: Porto, Portugal
- Course: Circuito da Boavista; 4.800 kilometres (2.983 mi)

Race One
- Laps: 11
Pole position
Driver		(Switzerland) Alain Menu	Chevrolet RML
Time		2:04.946	
Podium
First		(Switzerland) Alain Menu	Chevrolet RML
Second		(France) Yvan Muller	Chevrolet RML
Third		(United Kingdom) Robert Huff	Chevrolet RML
Fastest Lap
Driver		(Switzerland) Alain Menu	Chevrolet RML
Time		2:06.815	

Race Two
- Laps: 11
Podium
First		(United Kingdom) Robert Huff	Chevrolet RML
Second		(France) Yvan Muller	Chevrolet RML
Third		(Portugal) Tiago Monteiro	SUNRED Engineering
Fastest Lap
Driver		(United Kingdom) Robert Huff	Chevrolet RML
Time		2:05.846	

The 2011 FIA WTCC Race of Portugal was the sixth round of the 2011 World Touring Car Championship season and the fifth running of the FIA WTCC Race of Portugal. It was held on 3 July 2011 at the Circuito da Boavista street circuit in Porto, Portugal.

Both races were won by Chevrolet RML with Alain Menu winning race one and Robert Huff winning race two.

== Background ==
Coming into the round, Robert Huff was leading the drivers' championship. Kristian Poulsen was leading the Yokohama Independents' Trophy.

After the Race of the Czech Republic, Urs Sonderegger left the Wiechers-Sport team having struggled to be competitive. His replacement was Stefano D'Aste who had last raced for them in the 2009 season.

== Report ==
=== Testing and free practice ===
The works Chevrolet cars finished 1–2–3 in Friday's test session with Huff leading Yvan Muller and Menu. Norbert Michelisz was fourth and the fastest independent driver while fellow BMW driver D'Aste was fifth. The session came to an end prematurely when the Polestar Racing Volvo C30 of Robert Dahlgren collided with the barriers.

Menu led free practice one on Saturday morning, edging out team–mate Muller by less than a tenth of a second. Huff was third while Tom Coronel was fourth for ROAL Motorsport ahead of the local driver Tiago Monteiro.

Chevrolet completed their domination of the testing and practice in free practice two as Huff set the pace ahead of Muller. Gabriele Tarquini was third for Lukoil-SUNRED while Franz Engstler was the fastest independent driver in sixth. Michelisz ended his session early when he collided with one of the barriers, damaging the rear of his Zengő-Dension Team BMW 320 TC and puncturing a tyre.

=== Qualifying ===
Menu took his second pole position of the year, leading a Chevrolet 1–2–3 in qualifying. Tarquini had set the pace in the first part of qualifying ahead of Menu and Coronel while D'Aste ended up tenth to claim pole position for race two. Yokohama Trophy leader Poulsen was among those to miss out of the second session, the Liqui Moly Team Engstler driver took too much kerb heading into the final chicane and crashed into the barriers.

Muller set the pace for much of the second session but a quick lap from Menu in the final few minutes put the Swiss driver onto pole position. Muller lined up second with Huff third while Q1 pacesetter Tarquini was fourth. Monteiro was fifth at his home event ahead of Coronel and Dahlgren while eighth went to the top independent driver Michelisz. D'Aste and Engstler completed the top ten.

Aleksei Dudukalo would drop ten places on the grid for race one owing to an unscheduled engine change in his SEAT León 2.0 TDI.

=== Warm-Up ===
Championship leader Huff was quickest in Sunday morning's warm–up session ahead of pole sitter Menu.

=== Race One ===
Menu led the field away at the rolling start with Muller and Huff behind, Monteiro took fourth after passing Tarquini. Fredy Barth tangled with the diesel SEAT of Dudukalo at the first chicane with Dudukalo retiring on the first lap and Barth stopping on lap three. Muller and Huff spent much of the race battling for second place giving Menu a chance to break away from the pair into a comfortable lead. Javier Villa also retired after an accident at the first chicane, his race ended on lap six. The race saw relatively little action and Menu led a Chevrolet 1–2–3 with Monteiro staying ahead of Tarquini with Coronel sixth and Dahlgren seventh. Michelisz was the Yokohama Trophy winner in eighth after launching an unsuccessful attack on Dahlgren's seventh place, while Michel Nykjær and D'Aste rounded out the top ten.

=== Race Two ===
D'Aste was on pole position for the standing start while Dahlgren bogged down and much of the field had to avoid him. The Wiechers–Sport driver led the race until lap three when he was passed by Muller. Muller was able to build a 2.5 second lead while it took Huff another lap to pass D'Aste, after which Huff started to close in on the leading Chevrolet. Huff eventually caught up and the pair came together before Huff skidded over one of the chicanes and into the lead. D'Aste received a drive–through penalty for jumping the start and Monteiro moved into the third when the Italian dived into the pit lane. D'Aste collided with the bollards after a late nudge from Mehdi Bennani. Huff claimed the win ahead of Muller, Monteiro claimed a podium at his home race in third. Michelisz in fourth was the independent winner again while Poulsen, the Yokohama Trophy leader coming into the event, was last on the road.

== Results ==
=== Qualifying ===
Pos.	No.	Name	Team	Car	C	Q1	Q2
1	8	(Switzerland) Alain Menu	Chevrolet RML	Chevrolet Cruze 1.6T		2:06.622	2:04.946
2	1	(France) Yvan Muller	Chevrolet RML	Chevrolet Cruze 1.6T		2:06.964	2:05.280
3	2	(United Kingdom) Robert Huff	Chevrolet RML	Chevrolet Cruze 1.6T		2:06.918	2:05.284
4	3	(Italy) Gabriele Tarquini	Lukoil-SUNRED	SUNRED SR León 1.6T		2:06.397	2:05.548
5	18	(Portugal) Tiago Monteiro	SUNRED Engineering	SUNRED SR León 1.6T		2:06.838	2:05.656
6	15	(Netherlands) Tom Coronel	ROAL Motorsport	BMW 320 TC		2:06.673	2:06.143
7	30	(Sweden) Robert Dahlgren	Polestar Racing	Volvo C30 Drive		2:06.830	2:06.678
8	5	(Hungary) Norbert Michelisz	Zengő-Dension Team	BMW 320 TC	Y	2:06.789	2:06.682
9	26	(Italy) **Stefano D'Aste**	Wiechers-Sport	BMW 320 TC	Y	2:06.987	2:06.722
10	12	(Germany) Franz Engstler	Liqui Moly Team Engstler	BMW 320 TC	Y	2:06.827	2:06.770
11	17	(Denmark) Michel Nykjær	SUNRED Engineering	SUNRED SR León 1.6T	Y	2:07.021	
12	9	(Hong Kong) Darryl O'Young	bamboo-engineering	Chevrolet Cruze 1.6T	Y	2:07.066	
13	7	(Switzerland) Fredy Barth	SEAT Swiss Racing by SUNRED	SUNRED SR León 1.6T	Y	2:07.071	
14	20	(Spain) Javier Villa	Proteam Racing	BMW 320 TC	Y	2:07.072	
15	11	(Denmark) Kristian Poulsen	Liqui Moly Team Engstler	BMW 320 TC	Y	2:07.134	
16	74	(Spain) Pepe Oriola	SUNRED Engineering	SUNRED SR León 1.6T	Y	2:07.361	
17	4	(Russia) Aleksei Dudukalo	Lukoil-SUNRED	SEAT León 2.0 TDI	Y	2:08.480	
18	10	(Japan) Yukinori Taniguchi	bamboo-engineering	Chevrolet Cruze 1.6T	Y	2:10.123	
107% time: 2:15.244
–	25	(Morocco) Mehdi Bennani	Proteam Racing	BMW 320 TC	Y	no time set	

- **Bold** denotes Pole position for second race.

=== Race 1 ===
Pos.	No.	Name	Team	Car	C	Laps	Time/Retired	Grid	Points
1	8	(Switzerland) **Alain Menu**	Chevrolet RML	Chevrolet Cruze 1.6T		11	23:22.763	1	25
2	1	(France) Yvan Muller	Chevrolet RML	Chevrolet Cruze 1.6T		11	+1.262	2	18
3	2	(United Kingdom) Robert Huff	Chevrolet RML	Chevrolet Cruze 1.6T		11	+1.519	3	15
4	18	(Portugal) Tiago Monteiro	SUNRED Engineering	SUNRED SR León 1.6T		11	+5.710	5	12
5	3	(Italy) Gabriele Tarquini	Lukoil-SUNRED	SUNRED SR León 1.6T		11	+10.457	4	10
6	15	(Netherlands) Tom Coronel	ROAL Motorsport	BMW 320 TC		11	+12.237	6	8
7	30	(Sweden) Robert Dahlgren	Polestar Racing	Volvo C30 Drive		11	+16.693	7	6
8	5	(Hungary) Norbert Michelisz	Zengő-Dension Team	BMW 320 TC	Y	11	+17.256	8	4
9	17	(Denmark) Michel Nykjær	SUNRED Engineering	SUNRED SR León 1.6T	Y	11	+17.724	11	2
10	26	(Italy) Stefano D'Aste	Wiechers-Sport	BMW 320 TC	Y	11	+18.232	9	1
11	12	(Germany) Franz Engstler	Liqui Moly Team Engstler	BMW 320 TC	Y	11	+20.360	10	
12	9	(Hong Kong) Darryl O'Young	bamboo-engineering	Chevrolet Cruze 1.6T	Y	11	+25.778	12	
13	74	(Spain) Pepe Oriola	SUNRED Engineering	SUNRED SR León 1.6T	Y	11	+27.343	16	
14	11	(Denmark) Kristian Poulsen	Liqui Moly Team Engstler	BMW 320 TC	Y	11	+48.801	15	
15	10	(Japan) Yukinori Taniguchi	bamboo-engineering	Chevrolet Cruze 1.6T	Y	11	+55.046	17	
16	25	(Morocco) Mehdi Bennani	Proteam Racing	BMW 320 TC	Y	11	+56.084	19	
Ret	20	(Spain) Javier Villa	Proteam Racing	BMW 320 TC	Y	6	Race incident	14	
NC	7	(Switzerland) Fredy Barth	SEAT Swiss Racing by SUNRED	SUNRED SR León 1.6T	Y	3	+8 Laps	13	
Ret	4	(Russia) Aleksei Dudukalo	Lukoil-SUNRED	SEAT León 2.0 TDI	Y	0	Race incident	18	

- **Bold** denotes Fastest lap.

=== Race 2 ===
Pos.	No.	Name	Team	Car	C	Laps	Time/Retired	Grid	Points
1	2	(United Kingdom) **Robert Huff**	Chevrolet RML	Chevrolet Cruze 1.6T		11	23:24.533	3	25
2	1	(France) Yvan Muller	Chevrolet RML	Chevrolet Cruze 1.6T		11	+1.797	2	18
3	18	(Portugal) Tiago Monteiro	SUNRED Engineering	SUNRED SR León 1.6T		11	+8.728	4	15
4	5	(Hungary) Norbert Michelisz	Zengő-Dension Team	BMW 320 TC	Y	11	+9.752	7	12
5	15	(Netherlands) Tom Coronel	ROAL Motorsport	BMW 320 TC		11	+10.059	8	10
6	8	(Switzerland) Alain Menu	Chevrolet RML	Chevrolet Cruze 1.6T		11	+11.114	9	8
7	3	(Italy) Gabriele Tarquini	Lukoil-SUNRED	SUNRED SR León 1.6T		11	+12.849	10	6
8	12	(Germany) Franz Engstler	Liqui Moly Team Engstler	BMW 320 TC	Y	11	+19.474	6	4
9	9	(Hong Kong) Darryl O'Young	bamboo-engineering	Chevrolet Cruze 1.6T	Y	11	+24.147	12	2
10	7	(Switzerland) Fredy Barth	SEAT Swiss Racing by SUNRED	SUNRED SR León 1.6T	Y	11	+25.787	13	1
11	26	(Italy) Stefano D'Aste	Wiechers-Sport	BMW 320 TC	Y	11	+30.250	1	
12	17	(Denmark) Michel Nykjær	SUNRED Engineering	SUNRED SR León 1.6T	Y	11	+34.399	11	
13	4	(Russia) Aleksei Dudukalo	Lukoil-SUNRED	SEAT León 2.0 TDI	Y	11	+37.373	18	
14	74	(Spain) Pepe Oriola	SUNRED Engineering	SUNRED SR León 1.6T	Y	11	+37.950	15	
15	10	(Japan) Yukinori Taniguchi	bamboo-engineering	Chevrolet Cruze 1.6T	Y	11	+38.735	16	
16	30	(Sweden) Robert Dahlgren	Polestar Racing	Volvo C30 Drive		11	+39.365	5	
17	20	(Spain) Javier Villa	Proteam Racing	BMW 320 TC	Y	11	+41.084	17	
18	25	(Morocco) Mehdi Bennani	Proteam Racing	BMW 320 TC	Y	11	+58.161	19	
19	11	(Denmark) Kristian Poulsen	Liqui Moly Team Engstler	BMW 320 TC	Y	11	+1:53.447	14	

- **Bold** denotes Fastest lap.

== Standings after the event ==
Drivers' Championship standings

	Pos	Driver	Points
	1	(United Kingdom) Robert Huff	227
	2	(France) Yvan Muller	198
	3	(Switzerland) Alain Menu	167
2	4	(Portugal) Tiago Monteiro	101
	5	(Netherlands) Tom Coronel	100

Yokohama Independents' Trophy standings

	Pos	Driver	Points
2	1	(Hungary) Norbert Michelisz	74
1	2	(Denmark) Kristian Poulsen	69
1	3	(Spain) Javier Villa	64
	4	(Hong Kong) Darryl O'Young	59
	5	(Denmark) Michel Nykjær	53

Manufacturers' Championship standings

Pos	Manufacturer	Points
1	(United States) Chevrolet	491
2	(Spain) SR Customer Racing	279
3	(Germany) BMW Customer Racing Teams	276
4	(Sweden) Volvo Polestar Evaluation Team	76

- Note: Only the top five positions are included for both sets of drivers' standings.
