= 2011 FIA WTCC Race of Hungary =

Race details
- Round 4 of 12 in the 2011 World Touring Car Championship at Hungaroring in Mogyoród, Hungary.
- Date: 5 June, 2011
- Location: Mogyoród, Hungary
- Course: Hungaroring; 4.381 kilometres (2.722 mi)

Race One
- Laps: 12
Pole position
Driver		(Switzerland) Alain Menu	Chevrolet RML
Time		1:56.546	
Podium
First		(Switzerland) Alain Menu	Chevrolet RML
Second		(Hungary) Norbert Michelisz	Zengő-Dension Team
Third		(Spain) Javier Villa	Proteam Racing
Fastest Lap
Driver		(Hungary) Norbert Michelisz	Zengő-Dension Team
Time		1:57.552	

Race Two
- Laps: 14
Podium
First		(France) Yvan Muller	Chevrolet RML
Second		(United Kingdom) Robert Huff	Chevrolet RML
Third		(Italy) Gabriele Tarquini	Lukoil-SUNRED
Fastest Lap
Driver		(Hungary) Norbert Michelisz	Zengő-Dension Team
Time		2:04.056	

The 2011 FIA WTCC Race of Hungary was the fourth round of the 2011 World Touring Car Championship season and the inaugural running of the FIA WTCC Race of Hungary. It was held on 5 June 2011 at the Hungaroring in Mogyoród near Budapest, Hungary.

Both races were won by Chevrolet RML with Alain Menu winning race one and defending champion Yvan Muller taking his first win of the season in race one. Javier Villa took his first World Touring Car Championship podium finish in race one.

== Background ==
Coming into the round, Robert Huff was leading the drivers' championship 36 points clear of Chevrolet teammate Muller. Kristian Poulsen was leading the Yokohama Independents' Trophy.

The Race of Hungary was a late addition to the championship calendar, following the cancellation of the FIA WTCC Race of Morocco the Hungaroring was selected as the replacement venue on the same date.

SUNRED Engineering chose to debut their new 1.6 litre turbo engine event in some of their cars. Reliability concerns meant the front running cars of Gabriele Tarquini and Tiago Monteiro would not run the engine while Fredy Barth, Michel Nykjær and Pepe Oriola ran the new engine. DeTeam KK Motorsport driver Marchy Lee missed the Hungarian round pending a new sponsorship arrangement.

== Report ==
=== Testing and free practice ===
Menu led the opening test session on Friday ahead of Huff and Muller. The Volvo C30 of Robert Dahlgren was fourth quickest ahead of local driver Norbert Michelisz in the BMW 320 TC. Monteiro was the fastest SEAT driver in tenth and Oriola was fastest of the SUNRED León driver in fourteenth.

Huff was fastest in free practice one on Saturday morning, leading another Chevrolet 1–2–3. Michelisz was the lead BMW in fourth and Monteiro was once again the fastest SEAT car in seventh. The only notable problem during the session was when Urs Sonderegger spun his Wiechers-Sport BMW at the final corner and brought out the yellow flags before continuing.

Chevrolet topped the final practice session, this time with Muller edging out the Polestar Racing Volvo of Dahlgren. Sonderegger brought the session to a half with twelve minutes remaining when he crashed into the tyre wall at the first corner, the session resumed once the tyre wall had been repaired.

=== Qualifying ===
Menu took his first pole position since the 2009 FIA WTCC Race of UK, also ending the pole streak of his teammate Huff. In the first part of qualifying, Mehdi Bennani finished tenth to claim pole position for race two. Championship leader Huff didn't make it through to the second session and would line up twelfth for the races.

In the second session, Menu set his best time early on and Muller moved up to second in the final moments to lock out the front row for Chevrolet. Muller displaced Proteam Racing driver Villa to third and Tom Coronel was fourth. Local driver Michelisz was fifth and Dahlgren was sixth. Monteiro was the highest placed SEAT driver in seventh while Poulsen, Tarquini and Bennani rounded out the top ten.

=== Warm-Up ===
Dahlgren topped the warm–up session on Sunday morning as pole sitter Menu went sixth fastest. After sustaining minor injuries in practice, Sonderegger and Wiechers–Sport would not participate in the rest of the weekend.

=== Race One ===
Menu kept his lead at the start while a number of cars including Muller and Coronel ran wide at the first corner. This allowed Michelisz to climb up to second place and catch up with Menu, by lap four the pair were bumper to bumper. Tarquini recovered from his ninth place grid spot to run third at the end of the first lap having briefly battled for second with Michelisz. Dahlgren ran wide and slid through one of the gravel traps but was able to return to the pits. Darryl O'Young served a drive through on lap eight for cutting turn four. After defending for eleven laps, Tarquini and Villa made contact at the first corner and ran wide. Villa took third place and Tarquini dropped to fourth, while the Chevrolets of Muller and Huff stayed behind. Menu held on to take the win with Michelisz second and Villa in third took his first podium in the championship. Barth finished eighth and took the first points for the SUNRED turbo engine and Coronel had retired in the later stages of the race due to high water temperature.

=== Race Two ===
Bennani started on pole position but was passed by Poulsen, who was then struck by Michelisz who had outbraked himself while trying to take third place. Also on the opening lap, Muller was on his way up the order from eight on the grid. He was fourth by the time the race was red flagged due to a heavy rainstorm. All of the cars had been on slick tyres so stopping the race was the only option. The race was resumed on a damp track with the cars now sporting wet tyres. Menu dipped one of his wheels onto the grass at turn four and crashed into the barrier as Muller climbed up to second after passing Coronel. Dahlgren pushed Oriola into one of the barriers and the SEAT retired while Dahlgren would later receive a driver–through penalty for his actions. On the second lap after the restart, Muller then passed Tarquini to take the lead. Huff had climbed from twelfth at the start to eventually take second from Tarquini. At the end of the race, Muller and Huff formed a Chevrolet 1–2, Muller claiming his first win of the season. Tarquini was third ahead of Coronel and Monteiro. Franz Engstler in sixth was the winning independent driver.

== Results ==
=== Qualifying ===
Pos.	No.	Name	Team	Car	C	Q1	Q2
1	8	(Switzerland) Alain Menu	Chevrolet RML	Chevrolet Cruze 1.6T		1:57.620	1:56.546
2	1	(France) Yvan Muller	Chevrolet RML	Chevrolet Cruze 1.6T		1:57.371	1:56.657
3	20	(Spain) Javier Villa	Proteam Racing	BMW 320 TC	Y	1:57.166	1:56.710
4	15	(Netherlands) Tom Coronel	ROAL Motorsport	BMW 320 TC		1:57.589	1:56.912
5	5	(Hungary) Norbert Michelisz	Zengő-Dension Team	BMW 320 TC	Y	1:57.423	1:56.923
6	30	(Sweden) Robert Dahlgren	Polestar Racing	Volvo C30		1:57.207	1:56.945
7	18	(Portugal) Tiago Monteiro	SUNRED Engineering	SEAT León 2.0 TDI		1:57.578	1:56.974
8	11	(Denmark) Kristian Poulsen	Liqui Moly Team Engstler	BMW 320 TC	Y	1:57.599	1:57.048
9	3	(Italy) Gabriele Tarquini	Lukoil-SUNRED	SEAT León 2.0 TDI		1:57.397	1:57.073
10	25	(Morocco) **Mehdi Bennani**	Proteam Racing	BMW 320 TC	Y	1:57.706	1:57.376
11	9	(Hong Kong) Darryl O'Young	bamboo-engineering	Chevrolet Cruze 1.6T	Y	1:57.841	
12	2	(United Kingdom) Robert Huff	Chevrolet RML	Chevrolet Cruze 1.6T		1:57.854	
13	17	(Denmark) Michel Nykjær	SUNRED Engineering	SUNRED SR León 1.6T	Y	1:58.030	
14	74	(Spain) Pepe Oriola	SUNRED Engineering	SUNRED SR León 1.6T	Y	1:58.206	
15	7	(Switzerland) Fredy Barth	SEAT Swiss Racing by SUNRED	SUNRED SR León 1.6T	Y	1:58.440	
16	12	(Germany) Franz Engstler	Liqui Moly Team Engstler	BMW 320 TC	Y	1:58.582	
17	4	(Russia) Aleksei Dudukalo	Lukoil-SUNRED	SEAT León 2.0 TDI	Y	1:58.919	
18	10	(Japan) Yukinori Taniguchi	bamboo-engineering	Chevrolet Cruze 1.6T	Y	1:59.308	
107% time: 2:05.367
–	21	(Italy) Fabio Fabiani	Proteam Racing	BMW 320si	Y	2:05.381	
–	35	(Switzerland) Urs Sonderegger	Wiechers-Sport	BMW 320 TC	Y	no time set	

- **Bold** denotes Pole position for second race.

=== Race 1 ===
Pos.	No.	Name	Team	Car	C	Laps	Time/Retired	Grid	Points
1	8	(Switzerland) Alain Menu	Chevrolet RML	Chevrolet Cruze 1.6T		12	23:45.874	1	25
2	5	(Hungary) **Norbert Michelisz**	Zengő-Dension Team	BMW 320 TC	Y	12	+1.047	5	18
3	20	(Spain) Javier Villa	Proteam Racing	BMW 320 TC	Y	12	+17.383	3	15
4	2	(United Kingdom) Robert Huff	Chevrolet RML	Chevrolet Cruze 1.6T		12	+17.983	12	12
5	1	(France) Yvan Muller	Chevrolet RML	Chevrolet Cruze 1.6T		12	+18.365	2	10
6	3	(Italy) Gabriele Tarquini	Lukoil-SUNRED	SEAT León 2.0 TDI		12	+18.780	9	8
7	18	(Portugal) Tiago Monteiro	SUNRED Engineering	SEAT León 2.0 TDI		12	+19.374	7	6
8	7	(Switzerland) Fredy Barth	SEAT Swiss Racing by SUNRED	SUNRED SR León 1.6T	Y	12	+24.349	15	4
9	11	(Denmark) Kristian Poulsen	Liqui Moly Team Engstler	BMW 320 TC	Y	12	+24.481	8	2
10	74	(Spain) Pepe Oriola	SUNRED Engineering	SUNRED SR León 1.6T	Y	12	+26.555	14	1
11	10	(Japan) Yukinori Taniguchi	bamboo-engineering	Chevrolet Cruze 1.6T	Y	12	+35.306	18	
12	9	(Hong Kong) Darryl O'Young	bamboo-engineering	Chevrolet Cruze 1.6T	Y	12	+43.368	11	
13	17	(Denmark) Michel Nykjær	SUNRED Engineering	SUNRED SR León 1.6T	Y	12	+44.247	13	
14	25	(Morocco) Mehdi Bennani	Proteam Racing	BMW 320 TC	Y	12	+46.490	10	
15	12	(Germany) Franz Engstler	Liqui Moly Team Engstler	BMW 320 TC	Y	12	+1:06.399	16	
16	4	(Russia) Aleksei Dudukalo	Lukoil-SUNRED	SEAT León 2.0 TDI	Y	12	+1:10.090	17	
17	21	(Italy) Fabio Fabiani	Proteam Racing	BMW 320si	Y	12	+1:54.908	19	
18	15	(Netherlands) Tom Coronel	ROAL Motorsport	BMW 320 TC		9	+3 Laps	4	
NC	30	(Sweden) Robert Dahlgren	Polestar Racing	Volvo C30		5	+7 Laps	6	
DNS	35	(Switzerland) Urs Sonderegger	Wiechers-Sport	BMW 320 TC	Y	0	Did not start	–	

- **Bold** denotes Fastest lap.

=== Race 2 ===
Pos.	No.	Name	Team	Car	C	Laps	Time/Retired	Grid	Points
1	1	(France) Yvan Muller	Chevrolet RML	Chevrolet Cruze 1.6T		14	59:02.507	8	25
2	2	(United Kingdom) Robert Huff	Chevrolet RML	Chevrolet Cruze 1.6T		14	+3.631	12	18
3	3	(Italy) Gabriele Tarquini	Lukoil-SUNRED	SEAT León 2.0 TDI		14	+10.106	7	15
4	15	(Netherlands) Tom Coronel	ROAL Motorsport	BMW 320 TC		14	+11.699	4	12
5	18	(Portugal) Tiago Monteiro	SUNRED Engineering	SEAT León 2.0 TDI		14	+22.995	5	10
6	12	(Germany) Franz Engstler	Liqui Moly Team Engstler	BMW 320 TC	Y	14	+23.070	16	8
7	20	(Spain) Javier Villa	Proteam Racing	BMW 320 TC	Y	14	+26.322	10	6
8	9	(Hong Kong) Darryl O'Young	bamboo-engineering	Chevrolet Cruze 1.6T	Y	14	+31.267	11	4
9	30	(Sweden) Robert Dahlgren	Polestar Racing	Volvo C30		14	+36.832	9	2
10	7	(Switzerland) Fredy Barth	SEAT Swiss Racing by SUNRED	SUNRED SR León 1.6T	Y	14	+37.247	15	1
11	10	(Japan) Yukinori Taniguchi	bamboo-engineering	Chevrolet Cruze 1.6T	Y	14	+43.609	18	
12	4	(Russia) Aleksei Dudukalo	Lukoil-SUNRED	SEAT León 2.0 TDI	Y	14	+1:34.238	17	
13	17	(Denmark) Michel Nykjær	SUNRED Engineering	SUNRED SR León 1.6T	Y	13	+1 Lap	13	
14	25	(Morocco) Mehdi Bennani	Proteam Racing	BMW 320 TC	Y	13	+1 Lap	1	
15	5	(Hungary) **Norbert Michelisz**	Zengő-Dension Team	BMW 320 TC	Y	13	+1 Lap	6	
Ret	21	(Italy) Fabio Fabiani	Proteam Racing	BMW 320si	Y	5	Race incident	19	
Ret	8	(Switzerland) Alain Menu	Chevrolet RML	Chevrolet Cruze 1.6T		4	Race incident	2	
Ret	74	(Spain) Pepe Oriola	SUNRED Engineering	SUNRED SR León 1.6T	Y	4	Race incident	14	
Ret	11	(Denmark) Kristian Poulsen	Liqui Moly Team Engstler	BMW 320 TC	Y	3	Race incident	3	
DNS	35	(Switzerland) Urs Sonderegger	Wiechers-Sport	BMW 320 TC	Y	0	Did not start	–	

- **Bold** denotes Fastest lap.

== Standings after the event ==
Drivers' Championship standings

	Pos	Driver	Points
	1	(United Kingdom) Robert Huff	150
	2	(France) Yvan Muller	119
	3	(Switzerland) Alain Menu	104
1	4	(Italy) Gabriele Tarquini	75
1	5	(Portugal) Tiago Monteiro	74

Yokohama Independents' Trophy standings

	Pos	Driver	Points
	1	(Denmark) Kristian Poulsen	50
2	2	(Spain) Javier Villa	50
1	3	(Hungary) Norbert Michelisz	45
1	4	(Hong Kong) Darryl O'Young	41
1	5	(Germany) Franz Engstler	34

Manufacturers' Championship standings

Pos	Manufacturer	Points
1	(United States) Chevrolet	322
2	(Spain) SR Customer Racing	193
3	(Germany) BMW Customer Racing Teams	185
4	(Sweden) Volvo Polestar Evaluation Team	46

- Note: Only the top five positions are included for both sets of drivers' standings.
