= 2011 FIA WTCC Race of Brazil =

Race details
- Round 1 of 12 in the 2011 World Touring Car Championship at Autódromo Internacional de Curitiba in Curitiba, Brazil.
- Date: 20 March, 2011
- Location: Curitiba, Brazil
- Course: Autódromo Internacional de Curitiba; 3.695 kilometres (2.296 mi)

Race One
- Laps: 14
Pole position
Driver		(United Kingdom) Robert Huff	Chevrolet RML
Time		1:21.758	
Podium
First		(United Kingdom) Robert Huff	Chevrolet RML
Second		(France) Yvan Muller	Chevrolet RML
Third		(Brazil) Cacá Bueno	Chevrolet RML
Fastest Lap
Driver		(United Kingdom) Robert Huff	Chevrolet RML
Time		1:22.890	

Race Two
- Laps: 14
Podium
First		(Switzerland) Alain Menu	Chevrolet RML
Second		(Netherlands) Tom Coronel	ROAL Motorsport
Third		(France) Yvan Muller	Chevrolet RML
Fastest Lap
Driver		(United Kingdom) Robert Huff	Chevrolet RML
Time		1:22.943	

The 2011 FIA WTCC Race of Brazil was the opening round of the 2011 World Touring Car Championship season and the sixth running of the FIA WTCC Race of Brazil. It was held at the Autódromo Internacional de Curitiba near Curitiba, Brazil on 20 March 2011. This was the first race for the new FIA 1.6T world engine formula.

Both races were won by Chevrolet RML with Robert Huff winning race one and Alain Menu winning race two.

== Background ==
The Brazilian round had originally been scheduled to be held at the Autódromo José Carlos Pace in São Paulo but reverted to Curitiba in February owing to renovation works being carried out at the Interlagos circuit.

BMW had officially withdrawn its works commitment from the World Touring Car Championship at the end of the 2011. The German manufacturer instead focused on a customer programme with the new turbocharged engine. Volvo joined the series, entering a single car for Robert Dahlgren for the full season having only previously made one–off appearances in the championship.

Former SEAT León Eurocup racer Pepe Oriola joined the WTCC with SUNRED Engineering, becoming the youngest driver to compete in the series at the age of 16.

== Report ==
=== Testing and free practice ===
Tiago Monteiro of SUNRED Engineering was quickest in the opening shakedown session on Friday morning, less than a tenth quicker than the Chevrolet of Menu. Gabriele Tarquini and Javier Villa didn't set any times as their cars were being worked on and while the session had been scheduled to run for 90 minutes, it was cut short by 20 minutes after a heavy crash for Tarquini's Lukoil–SUNRED team–mate Aleksei Dudukalo.

Tom Coronel topped the opening test session on his first outing for returning team ROAL Motorsport. Huff was the leading Chevrolet driver and SEAT Swiss Racing by SUNRED Fredy Barth was the leading SEAT in fourth. Local driver Cacá Bueno driving a factory Chevrolet was sixth and the Volvo C30 of Dahlren was ninth.

The first free practice session on Saturday morning took place in wet conditions with Huff going fastest. Villa got out for his first laps in the BMW 320 TC having missed both sessions on Friday.

It was a Chevrolet 1–2–3–4 in free practice two with defending champion Yvan Muller leading Huff, Bueno and Menu. Oriola had a near–miss when his SUNRED car went through one of the gravel traps, while technical problems stopped Marchy Lee at the pit exit in his DeTeam KK Motorsport BMW 320 TC.

=== Qualifying ===
Huff took pole position in the new look qualifying format. The race one grid would be decided by the times from Q2, while the race two grid would be decided by the times from Q1 with the top ten reversed. Alain Menu failed to get through to Q2 to start eleventh for both races. The Volvo of Dahlgren lined up behind him. Huff had been close to dropping out but ended the session with the fifth fastest time.

Huff set the fastest time near the beginning of the ten minute Q2 session, rain set in towards the end of the session and nobody was able to beat his time. Muller lined up alongside him on the front row for race one. Bueno behind them made it a Chevrolet 1–2–3 and Michel Nykjær ended up fourth as the best independent driver. Kristian Poulsen was next up in fifth with Tarquini, Monteiro, Coronel, Barth and Franz Engstler completing the top ten.

=== Warm-Up ===
Muller was the fastest driver in the Sunday morning session with Barth second and pole sitter Huff third.

=== Race One ===
Huff started from pole position and led the entire race to claim the first win for the new turbocharged Chevrolet Cruze, holding back Muller all the way. Bueno had been challenged by Poulsen at turn one but the Danish driver could not pull off the move and then came under threat from Coronel. A mistake exiting Esse da Baixa allowed Coronel to pass and take fourth place. Poulsen closed in on Coronel and the two battled side–by–side, the Danish driver reclaimed fourth for a brief time before Coronel claimed the place on the last lap. Menu had taken advantage of the battle between Tarquini and Nykjær and passed both them to finish sixth. At the end of the race, Chevrolet finished 1–2–3 with Huff leading Muller and Bueno who took his first WTCC podium and points finish on home turf. Coronel, Poulsen and Menu came next and Tarquini, Nykjær, Engstler and Mehdi Bennani completed the top ten.

=== Race Two ===
After Barth was stripped of his best Q1 time, Menu moved up to pole position for the second race. At the start, Menu made a slow start and Coronel took the lead of the race having started from third, while Tarquini moved up to second. On lap three, Menu got past Tarquini to take second place with the rest of the Chevrolets close behind passing the SEAT on the following lap. Poulsen and Nykjær were fighting over the lead of Yokohama Trophy on lap six when the pair collided, Nykjær retired while dropped down the order. Menu had caught Coronel on lap ten and made a move for the lead at turn one. The pair touched and Coronel went off the track but stayed second, while Huff and Muller made contact fighting over the final podium spot with Muller getting the advantage. At the end of the race, Menu won with Coronel second and Muller third. Villa was the independents' winner by finishing eighth and Oriola scored a point in his first weekend finishing tenth.

== Results ==
=== Qualifying ===
Pos.	No.	Name	Team	Car	C	Q1	Q2
1	2	(United Kingdom) Robert Huff	Chevrolet RML	Chevrolet Cruze 1.6T		1:23.059	1:21.758
2	1	(France) Yvan Muller	Chevrolet RML	Chevrolet Cruze 1.6T		1:22.980	1:22.147
3	6	(Brazil) Cacá Bueno	Chevrolet RML	Chevrolet Cruze 1.6T		1:23.084	1:22.503
4	17	(Denmark) Michel Nykjær	SUNRED Engineering	SEAT León 2.0 TDI	Y	1:23.180	1:22.632
5	11	(Denmark) Kristian Poulsen	Liqui Moly Team Engstler	BMW 320 TC	Y	1:22.925	1:22.678
6	3	(Italy) Gabriele Tarquini	Lukoil-SUNRED	SEAT León 2.0 TDI		1:23.095	1:22.842
7	18	(Portugal) Tiago Monteiro	SUNRED Engineering	SEAT León 2.0 TDI		1:22.869	1:22.925
8	15	(Netherlands) Tom Coronel	ROAL Motorsport	BMW 320 TC		1:23.138	1:23.095
9^{1}	7	(Switzerland) Fredy Barth	SEAT Swiss Racing by SUNRED	SEAT León 2.0 TDI	Y	Excluded	1:23.338
10	12	(Germany) Franz Engstler	Liqui Moly Team Engstler	BMW 320 TC	Y	1:23.008	1:36.098
11	8	(Switzerland) Alain Menu	Chevrolet RML	Chevrolet Cruze 1.6T		1:23.260	
12	30	(Sweden) Robert Dahlgren	Polestar Racing	Volvo C30		1:23.300	
13	74	(Spain) Pepe Oriola	SUNRED Engineering	SEAT León 2.0 TDI	Y	1:23.343	
14	25	(Morocco) Mehdi Bennani	Proteam Racing	BMW 320 TC	Y	1:23.556	
15	65	(Hong Kong) Marchy Lee	DeTeam KK Motorsport	BMW 320 TC	Y	1:24.111	
16	20	(Spain) Javier Villa	Proteam Racing	BMW 320 TC	Y	1:24.268	
17	4	(Russia) Aleksei Dudukalo	Lukoil-SUNRED	SEAT León 2.0 TDI	Y	1:24.781	
18	10	(Japan) Yukinori Taniguchi	bamboo-engineering	Chevrolet Lacetti	Y	1:25.069	
19	21	(Italy) Fabio Fabiani	Proteam Racing	BMW 320si	Y	1:29.666	
EX^{2}	9	(Hong Kong) Darryl O'Young	bamboo-engineering	Chevrolet Lacetti	Y	Excluded	

^1 — Barth missed the weigh bridge after qualifying and had his times from Q1 removed.

^2 — O'Young was excluded from qualifying after his bamboo-engineering team worked on his car under parc ferme conditions.

=== Race 1 ===
Pos.	No.	Name	Team	Car	C	Laps	Time/Retired	Grid	Points
1	2	(United Kingdom) **Robert Huff**	Chevrolet RML	Chevrolet Cruze 1.6T		14	19:29.481	1	25
2	1	(France) Yvan Muller	Chevrolet RML	Chevrolet Cruze 1.6T		14	+0.873	2	18
3	6	(Brazil) Cacá Bueno	Chevrolet RML	Chevrolet Cruze 1.6T		14	+3.924	3	15
4	15	(Netherlands) Tom Coronel	ROAL Motorsport	BMW 320 TC		14	+12.714	8	12
5	11	(Denmark) Kristian Poulsen	Liqui Moly Team Engstler	BMW 320 TC	Y	14	+13.004	5	10
6	8	(Switzerland) Alain Menu	Chevrolet RML	Chevrolet Cruze 1.6T		14	+13.402	10	8
7	3	(Italy) Gabriele Tarquini	Lukoil-SUNRED	SEAT León 2.0 TDI		14	+14.214	6	6
8	17	(Denmark) Michel Nykjær	SUNRED Engineering	SEAT León 2.0 TDI	Y	14	+14.716	4	4
9	12	(Germany) Franz Engstler	Liqui Moly Team Engstler	BMW 320 TC	Y	14	+19.100	9	2
10	25	(Morocco) Mehdi Bennani	Proteam Racing	BMW 320 TC	Y	14	+19.591	13	1
11	18	(Portugal) Tiago Monteiro	SUNRED Engineering	SEAT León 2.0 TDI		14	+20.001	7	
12	30	(Sweden) Robert Dahlgren	Polestar Racing	Volvo C30		14	+20.343	11	
13	74	(Spain) Pepe Oriola	SUNRED Engineering	SEAT León 2.0 TDI	Y	14	+25.098	12	
14	20	(Spain) Javier Villa	Proteam Racing	BMW 320 TC	Y	14	+25.527	15	
15	7	(Switzerland) Fredy Barth	SEAT Swiss Racing by SUNRED	SEAT León 2.0 TDI	Y	14	+28.285	20	
16	65	(Hong Kong) Marchy Lee	DeTeam KK Motorsport	BMW 320 TC	Y	14	+41.400	14	
17	4	(Russia) Aleksei Dudukalo	Lukoil-SUNRED	SEAT León 2.0 TDI	Y	14	+41.820	16	
18	10	(Japan) Yukinori Taniguchi	bamboo-engineering	Chevrolet Lacetti	Y	14	+45.265	17	
19	21	(Italy) Fabio Fabiani	Proteam Racing	BMW 320si	Y	13	+1 Lap	18	
Ret	9	(Hong Kong) Darryl O'Young	bamboo-engineering	Chevrolet Lacetti	Y	4	Race incident	19	

- **Bold** denotes Fastest lap.

=== Race 2 ===
Pos.	No.	Name	Team	Car	C	Laps	Time/Retired	Grid	Points
1	8	(Switzerland) Alain Menu	Chevrolet RML	Chevrolet Cruze 1.6T		14	19:38.428	1	25
2	15	(Netherlands) Tom Coronel	ROAL Motorsport	BMW 320 TC		14	+0.265	3	18
3	1	(France) Yvan Muller	Chevrolet RML	Chevrolet Cruze 1.6T		14	+0.917	8	15
4	2	(United Kingdom) **Robert Huff**	Chevrolet RML	Chevrolet Cruze 1.6T		14	+1.321	6	12
5	6	(Brazil) Cacá Bueno	Chevrolet RML	Chevrolet Cruze 1.6T		14	+2.409	5	10
6	3	(Italy) Gabriele Tarquini	Lukoil-SUNRED	SEAT León 2.0 TDI		14	+4.512	4	8
7	18	(Portugal) Tiago Monteiro	SUNRED Engineering	SEAT León 2.0 TDI		14	+7.810	10	6
8	20	(Spain) Javier Villa	Proteam Racing	BMW 320 TC	Y	14	+16.894	15	4
9	12	(Germany) Franz Engstler	Liqui Moly Team Engstler	BMW 320 TC	Y	14	+17.571	7	2
10	74	(Spain) Pepe Oriola	SUNRED Engineering	SEAT León 2.0 TDI	Y	14	+20.361	12	1
11	9	(Hong Kong) Darryl O'Young	bamboo-engineering	Chevrolet Lacetti	Y	14	+27.978	20	
12	4	(Russia) Aleksei Dudukalo	Lukoil-SUNRED	SEAT León 2.0 TDI	Y	14	+31.428	16	
13	30	(Sweden) Robert Dahlgren	Polestar Racing	Volvo C30		14	+35.296	11	
14	11	(Denmark) Kristian Poulsen	Liqui Moly Team Engstler	BMW 320 TC	Y	14	+35.770	9	
15	10	(Japan) Yukinori Taniguchi	bamboo-engineering	Chevrolet Lacetti	Y	14	+36.203	17	
16	65	(Hong Kong) Marchy Lee	DeTeam KK Motorsport	BMW 320 TC	Y	14	+39.845	14	
Ret	7	(Switzerland) Fredy Barth	SEAT Swiss Racing by SUNRED	SEAT León 2.0 TDI	Y	7	Race incident	19	
NC	21	(Italy) Fabio Fabiani	Proteam Racing	BMW 320si	Y	7	+7 Laps	18	
Ret	17	(Denmark) Michel Nykjær	SUNRED Engineering	SEAT León 2.0 TDI	Y	5	Race incident	2	
Ret	25	(Morocco) Mehdi Bennani	Proteam Racing	BMW 320 TC	Y	0	Engine	13	

- **Bold** denotes Fastest lap.

== Standings after the event ==
Drivers' Championship standings

Pos	Driver	Points
1	(United Kingdom) Robert Huff	37
2	(Switzerland) Alain Menu	33
3	(France) Yvan Muller	33
4	(Netherlands) Tom Coronel	30
5	(Brazil) Cacá Bueno	25

Yokohama Independents' Trophy standings

Pos	Driver	Points
1	(Denmark) Kristian Poulsen	15
2	(Germany) Franz Engstler	14
3	(Spain) Javier Villa	13
4	(Spain) Pepe Oriola	10
5	(Denmark) Michel Nykjær	9

Manufacturers' Championship standings

Pos	Manufacturer	Points
1	(United States) Chevrolet	83
2	(Germany) BMW Customer Racing Teams	53
3	(Spain) SR Customer Racing	40
4	(Sweden) Volvo Polestar Evaluation Team	12

- Note: Only the top five positions are included for both sets of drivers' standings.
