= 2011 FIA WTCC Race of Spain =

2011 car races in Valencia, Spain

Race details
- Round 9 of 12 in the 2011 World Touring Car Championship at Circuit Ricardo Tormo in Valencia, Spain.
- Date: 4 September, 2011
- Location: Valencia, Spain
- Course: Circuit Ricardo Tormo; 4.005 kilometres (2.489 mi)

Race One
- Laps: 14
Pole position
Driver		(France) Yvan Muller	Chevrolet RML
Time		1:42.649	
Podium
First		(France) Yvan Muller	Chevrolet RML
Second		(Switzerland) Alain Menu	Chevrolet RML
Third		(Netherlands) Tom Coronel	ROAL Motorsport
Fastest Lap
Driver		(France) Yvan Muller	Chevrolet RML
Time		1:45.130	

Race Two
- Laps: 13
Podium
First		(France) Yvan Muller	Chevrolet RML
Second		(United Kingdom) Robert Huff	Chevrolet RML
Third		(Switzerland) Alain Menu	Chevrolet RML
Fastest Lap
Driver		(France) Yvan Muller	Chevrolet RML
Time		1:44.683	

The 2011 FIA WTCC Race of Spain was the ninth round of the 2011 World Touring Car Championship season and the seventh running of the FIA WTCC Race of Spain. It was held on 4 September 2011 at the Circuit Ricardo Tormo in Valencia, Spain.

Both races were won by Yvan Muller of Chevrolet RML who took the championship lead from teammate Robert Huff.

== Background ==
Chevrolet driver Robert Huff was the championship leader coming into the round, six points ahead of Yvan Muller. Norbert Michelisz was leading the Yokohama Independents' Trophy.

Russian driver David Sigachev joined Engstler Motorsport for the event, running under the DeTeam KK Motorsport banner which had been in the championship at the start of the season.

== Report ==
=== Free practice ===
Muller set the pace in the first free practice session with Alain Menu second and Huff third. Robert Dahlgren, Franz Engstler and Gabriele Tarquini were all caught out by the gravel trap at turn one, however Engstler went on to be the quickest independent driver by finishing eighth. bamboo-engineering's Darryl O'Young missed the session due to a fuel pump problem. Stefano D'Aste was fined €1,500 for ignoring yellow flags.

Muller was quickest again in the second practice session. The red flags came out early on when Proteam Racing's Fabio Fabiani crashed into the barriers at the first corner, the session was stopped for 20 minutes while repairs were made. Fabiani's teammate Mehdi Bennani had earlier beached his BMW 320 TC in the gravel at turn fourteen on his first flying lap, he tried to return to the track later on but was not allowed by the race officials as he had received outside assistance.

=== Qualifying ===
After leading both practice sessions, Muller set his third consecutive pole position in qualifying. He lined up for race one alongside title rival Huff. Tarquini topped the first part of qualifying with Menu second, Engstler was tenth in and would take the reversed grid pole position for race two for the second round in a row. Local driver Pepe Oriola looked set to make it through into the second session but dropped to eleventh at the last minute thanks to a quick lap from Michel Nykjær. Dahlgren was 17th having had little track time due to various problems,

The final part of qualifying was led by Muller throughout, Tarquini had initially been second until a late lap from Huff locked out the front row for Chevrolet. Tiago Monteiro would start on the second row was the fastest BMW driver in fifth, Menu was the last of the factory Chevrolet trio in sixth. Michelisz was the fastest independent driver, the Zengő-Dension Team driver having jumped up the timesheet at the expense of Javier Villa in the final moments of the session. Engstler and Nykjær completed the top ten.

=== Warm-Up ===
Having so far had a disappointing weekend, Polestar Racing driver Dahlgren topped the times in Sunday morning's warm–up session. Aleksei Dudukalo was having set up issues on his Lukoil-SUNRED SEAT, locking up frequently before depositing his car in the gravel at the first corner on his third lap.

=== Race One ===
Muller started on pole but he lost his lead almost immediately as Tarquini made a good getaway from third to pass the leading Chevrolet pair. Further round the lap, Monteiro tapped Menu then bumped into Huff who had been challenging for second place. Tarquini led until lap four when Muller made a successful pass for the lead at the second corner. Tarquini was succumbing to engine problems and he was passed by Menu before retiring with a misfire. Monteiro was running third before dropping down the order, Coronel took the final podium spot. At the chequered flag, Muller led a Chevrolet 1–2 to take the championship lead with Coronel third and Kristian Poulsen fourth taking the independent victory. Huff ended up fifth ahead of Villa, Michelisz and Monteiro. Dahlgren recovered from his disappointing grid spot to finish ninth and Stefano D'Aste was the last points scorer in tenth.

=== Race Two ===
Engstler started on pole position but made a slow start and Coronel took the lead, followed by Villa and Michelisz. The BMW trio led the race until four laps from the end when Villa made an attempt to take the lead, the Proteam driver made a move at turn two but Coronel defended and went up over the side of Villa's car. Villa ended up in the gravel, Coronel dropped down the order and Michelisz was unaffected by Muller passed the Zengő driver to take the lead. Michelisz was close behind until Huff made a last lap pass and Michelisz spun on the exit of the final corner. Muller won the second race of the day with Huff second and Menu third, Tarquini was fourth ahead of Poulsen who scored his second independent victory of the day.

== Results ==
=== Qualifying ===
Pos.	No.	Name	Team	Car	C	Q1	Q2
1	1	(France) Yvan Muller	Chevrolet RML	Chevrolet Cruze 1.6T		1:44.155	1:42.649
2	2	(United Kingdom) Robert Huff	Chevrolet RML	Chevrolet Cruze 1.6T		1:44.060	1:43.105
3	3	(Italy) Gabriele Tarquini	Lukoil-SUNRED	SUNRED SR León 1.6T		1:43.907	1:43.182
4	18	(Portugal) Tiago Monteiro	SUNRED Engineering	SUNRED SR León 1.6T		1:44.086	1:43.269
5	15	(Netherlands) Tom Coronel	ROAL Motorsport	BMW 320 TC		1:44.565	1:43.367
6	8	(Switzerland) Alain Menu	Chevrolet RML	Chevrolet Cruze 1.6T		1:43.992	1:43.387
7	5	(Hungary) Norbert Michelisz	Zengő-Dension Team	BMW 320 TC	Y	1:44.047	1:43.731
8	20	(Spain) Javier Villa	Proteam Racing	BMW 320 TC	Y	1:44.395	1:43.759
9	12	(Germany) **Franz Engstler**	Liqui Moly Team Engstler	BMW 320 TC	Y	1:44.577	1:44.077
10	17	(Denmark) Michel Nykjær	SUNRED Engineering	SUNRED SR León 1.6T	Y	1:44.461	1:44.836
11	74	(Spain) Pepe Oriola	SUNRED Engineering	SUNRED SR León 1.6T	Y	1:44.614	
12	11	(Denmark) Kristian Poulsen	Liqui Moly Team Engstler	BMW 320 TC	Y	1:44.734	
13	9	(Hong Kong) Darryl O'Young	bamboo-engineering	Chevrolet Cruze 1.6T	Y	1:44.741	
14	64	(Russia) David Sigachev	DeTeam KK Motorsport	BMW 320 TC	Y	1:44.768	
15	7	(Switzerland) Fredy Barth	SEAT Swiss Racing by SUNRED	SUNRED SR León 1.6T	Y	1:44.849	
16	26	(Italy) Stefano D'Aste	Wiechers-Sport	BMW 320 TC	Y	1:44.905	
17	30	(Sweden) Robert Dahlgren	Polestar Racing	Volvo C30 Drive		1:45.082	
18	10	(Japan) Yukinori Taniguchi	bamboo-engineering	Chevrolet Cruze 1.6T	Y	1:45.096	
19	4	(Russia) Aleksei Dudukalo	Lukoil-SUNRED	SUNRED SR León 1.6T	Y	1:45.113	
107% time: 1:51.180
–	21	(Italy) Fabio Fabiani	Proteam Racing	BMW 320si	Y	2:04.283	
–	25	(Morocco) Mehdi Bennani	Proteam Racing	BMW 320 TC	Y	12:24.555	

- **Bold** denotes Pole position for second race.

=== Race 1 ===
Pos.	No.	Name	Team	Car	C	Laps	Time/Retired	Grid	Points
1	1	(France) **Yvan Muller**	Chevrolet RML	Chevrolet Cruze 1.6T		14	25:39.052	1	25
2	8	(Switzerland) Alain Menu	Chevrolet RML	Chevrolet Cruze 1.6T		14	+1.103	6	18
3	15	(Netherlands) Tom Coronel	ROAL Motorsport	BMW 320 TC		14	+6.345	5	15
4	11	(Denmark) Kristian Poulsen	Liqui Moly Team Engstler	BMW 320 TC	Y	14	+9.961	12	12
5	2	(United Kingdom) Robert Huff	Chevrolet RML	Chevrolet Cruze 1.6T		14	+15.404	2	10
6	20	(Spain) Javier Villa	Proteam Racing	BMW 320 TC	Y	14	+15.630	8	8
7	5	(Hungary) Norbert Michelisz	Zengő-Dension Team	BMW 320 TC	Y	14	+16.206	7	6
8	18	(Portugal) Tiago Monteiro	SUNRED Engineering	SUNRED SR León 1.6T		14	+16.665	4	4
9	30	(Sweden) Robert Dahlgren	Polestar Racing	Volvo C30 Drive		14	+16.777	17	2
10	26	(Italy) Stefano D'Aste	Wiechers-Sport	BMW 320 TC	Y	14	+17.139	16	1
11	17	(Denmark) Michel Nykjær	SUNRED Engineering	SUNRED SR León 1.6T	Y	14	+18.962	10	
12	74	(Spain) Pepe Oriola	SUNRED Engineering	SUNRED SR León 1.6T	Y	14	+23.362	11	
13	4	(Russia) Aleksei Dudukalo	Lukoil-SUNRED	SUNRED SR León 1.6T	Y	14	+26.603	19	
14	10	(Japan) Yukinori Taniguchi	bamboo-engineering	Chevrolet Cruze 1.6T	Y	14	+28.955	18	
15	9	(Hong Kong) Darryl O'Young	bamboo-engineering	Chevrolet Cruze 1.6T	Y	14	+44.967	13	
16	21	(Italy) Fabio Fabiani	Proteam Racing	BMW 320si	Y	14	+1:37.597	20	
17	3	(Italy) Gabriele Tarquini	Lukoil-SUNRED	SUNRED SR León 1.6T		10	+4 Laps	3	
18	64	(Russia) David Sigachev	DeTeam KK Motorsport	BMW 320 TC	Y	10	+4 Laps	14	
19	7	(Switzerland) Fredy Barth	SEAT Swiss Racing by SUNRED	SUNRED SR León 1.6T	Y	10	+4 Laps	15	
NC	12	(Germany) Franz Engstler	Liqui Moly Team Engstler	BMW 320 TC	Y	9	+5 Laps	9	
Ret	25	(Morocco) Mehdi Bennani	Proteam Racing	BMW 320 TC	Y	4	Race incident	21	

- **Bold** denotes Fastest lap.

=== Race 2 ===
Pos.	No.	Name	Team	Car	C	Laps	Time/Retired	Grid	Points
1	1	(France) **Yvan Muller**	Chevrolet RML	Chevrolet Cruze 1.6T		13	23:14.296	5	25
2	2	(United Kingdom) Robert Huff	Chevrolet RML	Chevrolet Cruze 1.6T		13	+0.434	7	18
3	8	(Switzerland) Alain Menu	Chevrolet RML	Chevrolet Cruze 1.6T		13	+1.143	9	15
4	3	(Italy) Gabriele Tarquini	Lukoil-SUNRED	SUNRED SR León 1.6T		13	+2.966	10	12
5	11	(Denmark) Kristian Poulsen	Liqui Moly Team Engstler	BMW 320 TC	Y	13	+5.560	12	10
6	5	(Hungary) Norbert Michelisz	Zengő-Dension Team	BMW 320 TC	Y	13	+9.201	8	8
7	15	(Netherlands) Tom Coronel	ROAL Motorsport	BMW 320 TC		13	+12.184	2	6
8	74	(Spain) Pepe Oriola	SUNRED Engineering	SUNRED SR León 1.6T	Y	13	+15.651	11	4
9	30	(Sweden) Robert Dahlgren	Polestar Racing	Volvo C30 Drive		13	+17.952	16	2
10	12	(Germany) Franz Engstler	Liqui Moly Team Engstler	BMW 320 TC	Y	13	+19.055	1	1
11	26	(Italy) Stefano D'Aste	Wiechers-Sport	BMW 320 TC	Y	13	+22.493	15	
12	25	(Morocco) Mehdi Bennani	Proteam Racing	BMW 320 TC	Y	13	+24.806	21	
13	64	(Russia) David Sigachev	DeTeam KK Motorsport	BMW 320 TC	Y	13	+29.091	20	
14	9	(Hong Kong) Darryl O'Young	bamboo-engineering	Chevrolet Cruze 1.6T	Y	13	+30.030	13	
15	17	(Denmark) Michel Nykjær	SUNRED Engineering	SUNRED SR León 1.6T	Y	13	+30.488	3	
16	10	(Japan) Yukinori Taniguchi	bamboo-engineering	Chevrolet Cruze 1.6T	Y	13	+40.370	17	
17	21	(Italy) Fabio Fabiani	Proteam Racing	BMW 320si	Y	13	+1:41.824	19	
18	7	(Switzerland) Fredy Barth	SEAT Swiss Racing by SUNRED	SUNRED SR León 1.6T	Y	11	+2 Laps	14	
19	20	(Spain) Javier Villa	Proteam Racing	BMW 320 TC	Y	9	+4 Laps	4	
Ret	4	(Russia) Aleksei Dudukalo	Lukoil-SUNRED	SUNRED SR León 1.6T	Y	4	Race incident	18	
Ret	18	(Portugal) Tiago Monteiro	SUNRED Engineering	SUNRED SR León 1.6T		1	Race incident	6	

- **Bold** denotes Fastest lap.

== Standings after the event ==
Drivers' Championship standings

	Pos	Driver	Points
1	1	(France) Yvan Muller	333
1	2	(United Kingdom) Robert Huff	317
	3	(Switzerland) Alain Menu	253
1	4	(Netherlands) Tom Coronel	158
1	5	(Italy) Gabriele Tarquini	157

Yokohama Independents' Trophy standings

	Pos	Driver	Points
1	1	(Denmark) Kristian Poulsen	99
1	2	(Hungary) Norbert Michelisz	95
1	3	(Germany) Franz Engstler	82
1	4	(Spain) Javier Villa	81
2	5	(Hong Kong) Darryl O'Young	79

Manufacturers' Championship standings

Pos	Manufacturer	Points
1	(United States) Chevrolet	734
2	(Germany) BMW Customer Racing Teams	430
3	(Spain) SR Customer Racing	396
4	(Sweden) Volvo Polestar Evaluation Team	126

- Note: Only the top five positions are included for both sets of drivers' standings.
