= 2011 FIA WTCC Race of China =

Race details
- Round 11 of 12 in the 2011 World Touring Car Championship at Tianma Circuit in Shanghai, China.
- Date: 6 November, 2011
- Location: Shanghai, China
- Course: Tianma Circuit; 2.063 kilometres (1.282 mi)

Race One
- Laps: 25
Pole position
| Driver | | (Switzerland) Alain Menu | Chevrolet RML |
| Time | | 1:05.555 | |
Podium
| First | | (Switzerland) Alain Menu | Chevrolet RML |
| Second | | (United Kingdom) Colin Turkington | Wiechers-Sport |
| Third | | (United Kingdom) Robert Huff | Chevrolet RML |
Fastest Lap
| Driver | | (United Kingdom) Robert Huff | Chevrolet RML |
| Time | | 1:06.333 | |

Race Two
- Laps: 25
Podium
| First | | (France) Yvan Muller | Chevrolet RML |
| Second | | (Italy) Gabriele Tarquini | Lukoil-SUNRED |
| Third | | (United Kingdom) Robert Huff | Chevrolet RML |
Fastest Lap
| Driver | | (France) Yvan Muller | Chevrolet RML |
| Time | | 1:06.080 | |

The 2011 FIA WTCC Race of China was the eleventh round of the 2011 World Touring Car Championship season and the maiden running of the FIA WTCC Race of China. It was held on 6 November 2011 at the Tianma Circuit in Shanghai, China.

Both races were won by Chevrolet RML with Alain Menu winning race one and Yvan Muller winning race two.

== Background ==
Arriving in China, Yvan Muller was leading the drivers' championship. Kristian Poulsen was leading the Yokohama Independents' Trophy.

Fabio Fabiani switched from Proteam Racing to Liqui Moly Team Engstler while Charles Ng moving to DeTeam KK Motorsport where he would race a BMW 320 TC. Hong Kong racer Philip Ma joined Proteam as Fabiani's replacement for the final two rounds.

== Race report ==
=== Testing and free practice ===
Menu was fastest in the opening test session having spent the later part half of the session trading best times with Colin Turkington and Robert Dahlgren. The red flags came out towards the end of the session as Javier Villa had beached his Proteam BMW in the gravel at turn four.

Chevrolet driver Robert Huff was quickest in the first free practice session on Saturday morning, overtaking early pacesetter Tom Coronel at the top of the times at the midway point. As was the case in testing, the SUNRED cars were struggling to be competitive with Gabriele Tarquini their best placed driver in 12th.

When practice resumed in the afternoon, Huff was quickest once again. A BMW was second quickest once again, this time courtesy of Zengő-Dension Team's Norbert Michelisz. Aleksei Dudukalo got a SUNRED car into the top time for the first time that weekend while fellow SUNRED driver Fredy Barth required an engine change and would take a five–place grid penalty for race one.

=== Qualifying ===
Menu took pole position for the second round in a row as he shared the front row with team–mate Huff. Qualifying took place on a wet track but a dry line began to emerge as the session went on. This was unfortunate for those drivers which were running a wet set–up, Polestar Racing's Dahlgren finished the first element of qualifying 13th. Another notable driver who missed Q2 was Yokohama Trophy leader Poulsen. Huff finished the first session in tenth place to secure the pole position for race two where he would share the front row with Tarquini.

Menu set his best time in Q2 late on as Huff was unable to produce a quicker time. Turkington was the fastest independent driver in third and Michelisz, who was running second in the Yokohama Trophy behind Poulsen, was fourth. Muller was seventh after going off on his last flying lap. SUNRED got four cars through to Q2 after a poor showing in testing and practice, Tarquini was their best placed driver in fifth while Tiago Monteiro, Pepe Oriola and Barth where eighth, ninth and tenth.

=== Warm-Up ===
Proteam Racing's Mehdi Bennani set the pace in Sunday morning's warm–up session while pole–sitter Menu was fifth.

=== Race One ===
Menu started from pole position as the top five drivers got away without exchanging places. Muller managed to pass Tarquini on the second lap to take fifth position, a lap later the SUNRED driver then dropped further down the order as he was passed by Monteiro, Coronel and Poulsen, he later pulled into the pits with brake problems. Lap four saw Huff and Turkington come together although no positions were exchanged until lap thirteen when Turkington passed Huff to take second place. Having held on to his position, Michelisz lost a place Muller and to Coronel and independent rival Poulsen. By lap twenty Turkington had closed in on race leader Menu and the pair were nose to tail, Menu responded by upping his pace and increasing the gap to half a second. Michel Nykjær and Charles Ng clashed two laps from the end and bamboo–engineering driver Yukinori Taniguchi was hit as a result, on the following lap the Japanese driver crashed as a result of suspension damage incurred during the incident. At the end of the race, Menu won ahead of Turkington who took the first podium finish for Wiechers-Sport. Huff was third and Muller fourth which saw the gap between the pair in the championship reduce slightly.

=== Race Two ===
Huff started on pole position for race two but was passed straight away by a fast starting Tarquini. Michelisz was then spun around the front of Monteiro in an incident which eliminated Michelisz, Monteiro, Villa and Darryl O'Young. Further round the lap, Tarquini and Huff came together with the latter hopping across the grass to rejoin in fourth place. Muller had taken second from Turkington and on lap two the Wiechers–Sport driver lost another place to Huff. Tarquini held the lead until lap four when Muller passed him and the Chevrolet driver pulled away. Turkington lost more places on lap ten when he locked up at the first corner. Tarquini was now leading a train of cars stuck behind the SEAT, in the middle of the group Turkington took fifth place from Menu. By lap twenty the group of cars stuck behind Tarquini extended all the way down to Franz Engstler in eighth place. On the penultimate lap Menu pushed Turkington but was unable to pass while on the final lap, Turkington gained fourth from Coronel after the ROAL Motorsport driver made contact with Huff. Muller won the race with Tarquini second and Huff third. Turkington was the independent winner once again. Ng finished tenth to score his first point in the championship.

== Results ==
=== Qualifying ===
| Pos. | No. | Name | Team | Car | C | Q1 | Q2 |
|---|---|---|---|---|---|---|---|
| 1 | 8 | (Switzerland) Alain Menu | Chevrolet RML | Chevrolet Cruze 1.6T | | 1:06.854 | 1:05.555 |
| 2 | 2 | (United Kingdom) **Robert Huff** | Chevrolet RML | Chevrolet Cruze 1.6T | | 1:07.331 | 1:05.700 |
| 3 | 29 | (United Kingdom) Colin Turkington | Wiechers-Sport | BMW 320 TC | Y | 1:06.919 | 1:05.712 |
| 4 | 5 | (Hungary) Norbert Michelisz | Zengő-Dension Team | BMW 320 TC | Y | 1:06.795 | 1:05.738 |
| 5 | 3 | (Italy) Gabriele Tarquini | Lukoil-SUNRED | SUNRED SR León 1.6T | | 1:07.287 | 1:05.743 |
| 6 | 15 | (Netherlands) Tom Coronel | ROAL Motorsport | BMW 320 TC | | 1:06.690 | 1:05.803 |
| 7 | 1 | (France) Yvan Muller | Chevrolet RML | Chevrolet Cruze 1.6T | | 1:07.168 | 1:05.920 |
| 8 | 18 | (Portugal) Tiago Monteiro | SUNRED Engineering | SUNRED SR León 1.6T | | 1:07.018 | 1:05.922 |
| 9 | 74 | (Spain) Pepe Oriola | SUNRED Engineering | SUNRED SR León 1.6T | Y | 1:07.006 | 1:06.591 |
| 10 | 7 | (Switzerland) Fredy Barth | SEAT Swiss Racing by SUNRED | SUNRED SR León 1.6T | Y | 1:07.180 | 1:06.741 |
| 11 | 11 | (Denmark) Kristian Poulsen | Liqui Moly Team Engstler | BMW 320 TC | Y | 1:07.555 | |
| 12 | 20 | (Spain) Javier Villa | Proteam Racing | BMW 320 TC | Y | 1:07.710 | |
| 13 | 30 | (Sweden) Robert Dahlgren | Polestar Racing | Volvo C30 Drive | | 1:07.770 | |
| 14 | 4 | (Russia) Aleksei Dudukalo | Lukoil-SUNRED | SUNRED SR León 1.6T | Y | 1:07.771 | |
| 15 | 25 | (Morocco) Mehdi Bennani | Proteam Racing | BMW 320 TC | Y | 1:07.836 | |
| 16 | 12 | (Germany) Franz Engstler | Liqui Moly Team Engstler | BMW 320 TC | Y | 1:08.004 | |
| 17 | 17 | (Denmark) Michel Nykjær | SUNRED Engineering | SUNRED SR León 1.6T | Y | 1:08.069 | |
| 18 | 9 | (Hong Kong) Darryl O'Young | bamboo-engineering | Chevrolet Cruze 1.6T | Y | 1:08.317 | |
| 19 | 10 | (Japan) Yukinori Taniguchi | bamboo-engineering | Chevrolet Cruze 1.6T | Y | 1:09.274 | |
107% time: 1:11.358
| – | 21 | (Italy) Fabio Fabiani | Liqui Moly Team Engstler | BMW 320si | Y | 1:12.641 | |
| – | 23 | (Hong Kong) Philip Ma | Proteam Racing | BMW 320si | Y | 1:14.194 | |
| – | 51 | (Hong Kong) Charles Ng | DeTeam KK Motorsport | BMW 320 TC | Y | 1:14.947 | |

- **Bold** denotes Pole position for second race.

=== Race 1 ===
| Pos. | No. | Name | Team | Car | C | Laps | Time/Retired | Grid | Points |
|---|---|---|---|---|---|---|---|---|---|
| 1 | 8 | (Switzerland) Alain Menu | Chevrolet RML | Chevrolet Cruze 1.6T | | 25 | 28:05.718 | 1 | 25 |
| 2 | 29 | (United Kingdom) Colin Turkington | Wiechers-Sport | BMW 320 TC | Y | 25 | +1.222 | 3 | 18 |
| 3 | 2 | (United Kingdom) **Robert Huff** | Chevrolet RML | Chevrolet Cruze 1.6T | | 25 | +5.065 | 2 | 15 |
| 4 | 1 | (France) Yvan Muller | Chevrolet RML | Chevrolet Cruze 1.6T | | 25 | +8.005 | 7 | 12 |
| 5 | 15 | (Netherlands) Tom Coronel | ROAL Motorsport | BMW 320 TC | | 25 | +9.010 | 6 | 10 |
| 6 | 11 | (Denmark) Kristian Poulsen | Liqui Moly Team Engstler | BMW 320 TC | Y | 25 | +9.921 | 10 | 8 |
| 7 | 25 | (Morocco) Mehdi Bennani | Proteam Racing | BMW 320 TC | Y | 25 | +15.487 | 14 | 6 |
| 8 | 18 | (Portugal) Tiago Monteiro | SUNRED Engineering | SUNRED SR León 1.6T | | 25 | +22.630 | 8 | 4 |
| 9 | 30 | (Sweden) Robert Dahlgren | Polestar Racing | Volvo C30 Drive | | 25 | +26.204 | 13 | 2 |
| 10 | 20 | (Spain) Javier Villa | Proteam Racing | BMW 320 TC | Y | 25 | +27.118 | 11 | 1 |
| 11 | 5 | (Hungary) Norbert Michelisz | Zengő-Dension Team | BMW 320 TC | Y | 25 | +28.291 | 4 | |
| 12 | 12 | (Germany) Franz Engstler | Liqui Moly Team Engstler | BMW 320 TC | Y | 25 | +28.539 | 16 | |
| 13 | 9 | (Hong Kong) Darryl O'Young | bamboo-engineering | Chevrolet Cruze 1.6T | Y | 25 | +38.072 | 18 | |
| 14 | 17 | (Denmark) Michel Nykjær | SUNRED Engineering | SUNRED SR León 1.6T | Y | 25 | +53.157 | 17 | |
| 15 | 4 | (Russia) Aleksei Dudukalo | Lukoil-SUNRED | SUNRED SR León 1.6T | Y | 25 | +59.011 | 13 | |
| 16 | 51 | (Hong Kong) Charles Ng | DeTeam KK Motorsport | BMW 320 TC | Y | 25 | +1:41.155 | 22 | |
| 17 | 74 | (Spain) Pepe Oriola | SUNRED Engineering | SUNRED SR León 1.6T | Y | 24 | +1 Lap | 9 | |
| 18 | 21 | (Italy) Fabio Fabiani | Liqui Moly Team Engstler | BMW 320si | Y | 24 | +1 Lap | 20 | |
| 19 | 23 | (Hong Kong) Philip Ma | Proteam Racing | BMW 320si | Y | 24 | +1 Lap | 21 | |
| 20 | 10 | (Japan) Yukinori Taniguchi | bamboo-engineering | Chevrolet Cruze 1.6T | Y | 23 | +2 Laps | 19 | |
| 21 | 7 | (Switzerland) Fredy Barth | SEAT Swiss Racing by SUNRED | SUNRED SR León 1.6T | Y | 21 | +4 Laps | 15 | |
| NC | 3 | (Italy) Gabriele Tarquini | Lukoil-SUNRED | SUNRED SR León 1.6T | | 15 | +10 Laps | 5 | |

- **Bold** denotes Fastest lap.

=== Race 2 ===
| Pos. | No. | Name | Team | Car | C | Laps | Time/Retired | Grid | Points |
|---|---|---|---|---|---|---|---|---|---|
| 1 | 1 | (France) **Yvan Muller** | Chevrolet RML | Chevrolet Cruze 1.6T | | 25 | 28:19.599 | 4 | 25 |
| 2 | 3 | (Italy) Gabriele Tarquini | Lukoil-SUNRED | SUNRED SR León 1.6T | | 25 | +10.518 | 2 | 18 |
| 3 | 2 | (United Kingdom) Robert Huff | Chevrolet RML | Chevrolet Cruze 1.6T | | 25 | +11.385 | 1 | 15 |
| 4 | 29 | (United Kingdom) Colin Turkington | Wiechers-Sport | BMW 320 TC | Y | 25 | +11.812 | 7 | 12 |
| 5 | 15 | (Netherlands) Tom Coronel | ROAL Motorsport | BMW 320 TC | | 25 | +12.140 | 10 | 10 |
| 6 | 8 | (Switzerland) Alain Menu | Chevrolet RML | Chevrolet Cruze 1.6T | | 25 | +12.896 | 8 | 8 |
| 7 | 11 | (Denmark) Kristian Poulsen | Liqui Moly Team Engstler | BMW 320 TC | Y | 25 | +13.336 | 11 | 6 |
| 8 | 12 | (Germany) Franz Engstler | Liqui Moly Team Engstler | BMW 320 TC | Y | 25 | +13.612 | 16 | 4 |
| 9 | 30 | (Sweden) Robert Dahlgren | Polestar Racing | Volvo C30 Drive | | 25 | +22.279 | 13 | 2 |
| 10 | 51 | (Hong Kong) Charles Ng | DeTeam KK Motorsport | BMW 320 TC | Y | 25 | +24.172 | 22 | 1 |
| 11 | 25 | (Morocco) Mehdi Bennani | Proteam Racing | BMW 320 TC | Y | 25 | +33.725 | 15 | |
| 12 | 7 | (Switzerland) Fredy Barth | SEAT Swiss Racing by SUNRED | SUNRED SR León 1.6T | Y | 25 | +36.977 | 3 | |
| 13 | 74 | (Spain) Pepe Oriola | SUNRED Engineering | SUNRED SR León 1.6T | Y | 25 | +43.090 | 6 | |
| 14 | 17 | (Denmark) Michel Nykjær | SUNRED Engineering | SUNRED SR León 1.6T | Y | 25 | +46.761 | 17 | |
| 15 | 21 | (Italy) Fabio Fabiani | Liqui Moly Team Engstler | BMW 320si | Y | 24 | +1 Lap | 19 | |
| 16 | 23 | (Hong Kong) Philip Ma | Proteam Racing | BMW 320si | Y | 24 | +1 Lap | 20 | |
| 17 | 4 | (Russia) Aleksei Dudukalo | Lukoil-SUNRED | SUNRED SR León 1.6T | Y | 23 | +2 Laps | 14 | |
| Ret | 9 | (Hong Kong) Darryl O'Young | bamboo-engineering | Chevrolet Cruze 1.6T | Y | 2 | Race incident | 21 | |
| Ret | 18 | (Portugal) Tiago Monteiro | SUNRED Engineering | SUNRED SR León 1.6T | | 1 | Race incident | 5 | |
| Ret | 5 | (Hungary) Norbert Michelisz | Zengő-Dension Team | BMW 320 TC | Y | 1 | Race incident | 9 | |
| Ret | 20 | (Spain) Javier Villa | Proteam Racing | BMW 320 TC | Y | 0 | Race incident | 12 | |
| DNS | 10 | (Japan) Yukinori Taniguchi | bamboo-engineering | Chevrolet Cruze 1.6T | Y | 0 | Did not start | 18 | |

- **Bold** denotes Fastest lap.

== Standings after the event ==
Drivers' Championship standings

| Pos | Driver | Points |
|---|---|---|
| 1 | (France) Yvan Muller | 400 |
| 2 | (United Kingdom) Robert Huff | 380 |
| 3 | (Switzerland) Alain Menu | 323 |
| 4 | (Netherlands) Tom Coronel | 203 |
| 5 | (Italy) Gabriele Tarquini | 177 |

Yokohama Independents' Trophy standings

| Pos | Driver | Points |
|---|---|---|
| 1 | (Denmark) Kristian Poulsen | 127 |
| 2 | (Hungary) Norbert Michelisz | 104 |
| 3 | (Denmark) Michel Nykjær | 98 |
| 4 | (Germany) Franz Engstler | 97 |
| 5 | (Spain) Javier Villa | 92 |

Manufacturers' Championship standings

| Pos | Manufacturer | Points |
|---|---|---|
| 1 | (United States) Chevrolet | 890 |
| 2 | (Germany) BMW Customer Racing Teams | 537 |
| 3 | (Spain) SR Customer Racing | 475 |
| 4 | (Sweden) Volvo Polestar Evaluation Team | 154 |

- Note: Only the top five positions are included for both sets of drivers' standings.
