= 2011 FIA WTCC Race of the Czech Republic =

Race details
- Round 5 of 12 in the 2011 World Touring Car Championship at Masaryk Circuit in Brno, Czech Republic.
- Date: 19 June, 2011
- Location: Brno, Czech Republic
- Course: Masaryk Circuit; 5.403 kilometres (3.357 mi)

Race One
- Laps: 10
Pole position
Driver		(France) Yvan Muller	Chevrolet RML
Time		2:08.884	
Podium
First		(United Kingdom) Robert Huff	Chevrolet RML
Second		(France) Yvan Muller	Chevrolet RML
Third		(Switzerland) Alain Menu	Chevrolet RML
Fastest Lap
Driver		(United Kingdom) Robert Huff	Chevrolet RML
Time		2:10.863	

Race Two
- Laps: 10
Podium
First		(France) Yvan Muller	Chevrolet RML
Second		(Netherlands) Tom Coronel	ROAL Motorsport
Third		(Switzerland) Alain Menu	Chevrolet RML
Fastest Lap
Driver		(France) Yvan Muller	Chevrolet RML
Time		2:11.640	

The 2011 FIA WTCC Race of the Czech Republic (formally the 2011 FIA WTCC Monroe Race of the Czech Republic) was the fifth round of the 2011 World Touring Car Championship season and the sixth running of the FIA WTCC Race of the Czech Republic. It was held on 19 June 2011 at the Masaryk Circuit in Brno, Czech Republic.

Both races were won by Chevrolet RML with Robert Huff winning race one and Yvan Muller winning race two.

== Background ==
After the previous round, Huff was leading the drivers' championship. Kristian Poulsen was tied on points at the top of the Yokohama Independents' Trophy with Javier Villa.

Gabriele Tarquini and Tiago Monteiro became the next two SUNRED Engineering drivers to switch to the new 1.6T engine. Polestar Racing also switched to their own turbo engine in the Volvo C30 driven by Robert Dahlgren.

== Report ==
=== Free practice ===
Muller led the opening free practice session with Huff and Alain Menu behind making it a Chevrolet 1–2–3. Norbert Michelisz in fourth was the fastest independent runner and Dahlgren was fifth with the new turbocharged Volvo. Michel Nykjær was the fastest SUNRED driver.

Muller, Huff and Menu finished the second free practice session in the same order as Chevrolet continued to dominate practice. Dahlgren was fourth in the Volvo and Tom Coronel was fifth in the leading BMW. Tarquini was the quickest SUNRED car in sixth but teammate Monteiro didn't set a competitive lap time during the session having suffered from a misfiring engine.

=== Qualifying ===
Muller took his first pole position of the season with him and team–mate Huff locking out the front row for Chevrolet. Dahlgren had been fastest in the first segment of qualifying with Huff second and Muller third. Franz Engstler ended the session tenth and would therefore take the reversed grid pole position for race two, lining up alongside Coronel. SUNRED drivers Tiago Monteiro and Fredy Barth suffered turbo problems in their cars and did not set any competitive times during the session.

In Q2, Muller set the fastest time and Huff was second. Coronel in third separated Menu in fourth from the other two Chevrolets. Michelisz, Dahlgren, Poulsen, Tarquini, Darryl O'Young and Engstler rounded out the top ten.

Michelisz later excluded from qualifying when his Zengő-Dension Team car was found to be underweight. This promoted Nykjær to tenth in Q1 and therefore pole position in race two.

=== Warm-up ===
Muller was quickest in the warm–up session on Sunday morning, the pole sitter edging out Dahlgren's Volvo by less than a tenth of a second.

=== Race one ===
Muller led the rolling start but Huff made an attempt to take the lead at the first corner. Huff failed to do so but his second attempt at turn seven saw him lead the race. Nykjær and Tarquini made contact at the first corner with Tarquini retiring due to the subsequent damage. Coronel in third was busy keeping Menu behind until three laps from the end when the Chevrolet driver outbraked Coronel for third place with three laps to go. At the end of the race, championship leader Huff led a Chevrolet 1–2–3 with Coronel ending up fourth ahead of independent winner Poulsen. Dahlgren was sixth and O'Young came out on top in the battle for seventh place ahead of Michelisz who came from the back to eighth. Villa and Nykjær completed the top ten while Monteiro continued to struggle and ended up twelfth.

=== Race two ===
Nykjær started on pole position for race two but was quickly passed by the fast starting Coronel who led into the first corner. Muller had made a good start from eighth and took second place from Nykjær at turn eight. Two laps later, Muller had closed in on Coronel and passed the ROAL Motorsport driver. Coronel then made contact with Menu defending second place while Huff was behind the pair in fourth place. Further back, Tarquini and Poulsen battled over position further down the field which ended with Poulsen going through the gravel trap at turn five. Tarquini fell down to sixth and Poulsen recovered to eighth at the end. At the end of the race, Muller claimed the win with Coronel second and Menu third. Race one winner Huff was fourth ahead of race two pole sitter and Yokohama Trophy winner Nykjær. Tarquini, Villa, Poulsen, Dahlgren and Mehdi Bennani completed the top ten.

== Results ==
=== Qualifying ===
Pos.	No.	Name	Team	Car	C	Q1	Q2
1	1	(France) Yvan Muller	Chevrolet RML	Chevrolet Cruze 1.6T		2:10.384	2:08.884
2	2	(United Kingdom) Robert Huff	Chevrolet RML	Chevrolet Cruze 1.6T		2:10.375	2:09.256
3	15	(Netherlands) Tom Coronel	ROAL Motorsport	BMW 320 TC		2:10.831	2:09.717
4	8	(Switzerland) Alain Menu	Chevrolet RML	Chevrolet Cruze 1.6T		2:10.466	2:09.830
5	30	(Sweden) Robert Dahlgren	Polestar Racing	Volvo C30 Drive		2:10.264	2:09.998
6	11	(Denmark) Kristian Poulsen	Liqui Moly Team Engstler	BMW 320 TC	Y	2:10.459	2:10.326
7	3	(Italy) Gabriele Tarquini	Lukoil-SUNRED	SUNRED SR León 1.6T		2:10.729	2:10.491
8	9	(Hong Kong) Darryl O'Young	bamboo-engineering	Chevrolet Cruze 1.6T	Y	2:10.506	2:10.559
9	12	(Germany) Franz Engstler	Liqui Moly Team Engstler	BMW 320 TC	Y	2:10.839	2:11.339
10	17	(Denmark) **Michel Nykjær**	SUNRED Engineering	SUNRED SR León 1.6T	Y	2:10.959	no time set
11	20	(Spain) Javier Villa	Proteam Racing	BMW 320 TC	Y	2:11.285	
12	25	(Morocco) Mehdi Bennani	Proteam Racing	BMW 320 TC	Y	2:11.410	
13	74	(Spain) Pepe Oriola	SUNRED Engineering	SUNRED SR León 1.6T	Y	2:11.687	
14	10	(Japan) Yukinori Taniguchi	bamboo-engineering	Chevrolet Cruze 1.6T	Y	2:11.832	
15	4	(Russia) Aleksei Dudukalo	Lukoil-SUNRED	SEAT León 2.0 TDI	Y	2:11.899	
16	35	(Switzerland) Urs Sonderegger	Wiechers-Sport	BMW 320 TC	Y	2:17.051	
EX^{1}	5	(Hungary) Norbert Michelisz	Zengő-Dension Team	BMW 320 TC	Y	Excluded	Excluded
107% time: 2:19.382
–	18	(Portugal) Tiago Monteiro	SUNRED Engineering	SUNRED SR León 1.6T		2:19.531	
–	7	(Switzerland) Fredy Barth	SEAT Swiss Racing by SUNRED	SUNRED SR León 1.6T	Y	13:26.922	

- **Bold** denotes Pole position for second race.

^1 — Michelisz was excluded from qualifying after his car was found to be underweight after the session.

=== Race 1 ===
Pos.	No.	Name	Team	Car	C	Laps	Time/Retired	Grid	Points
1	2	(United Kingdom) **Robert Huff**	Chevrolet RML	Chevrolet Cruze 1.6T		10	21:59.507	2	25
2	1	(France) Yvan Muller	Chevrolet RML	Chevrolet Cruze 1.6T		10	+0.858	1	18
3	8	(Switzerland) Alain Menu	Chevrolet RML	Chevrolet Cruze 1.6T		10	+11.697	4	15
4	15	(Netherlands) Tom Coronel	ROAL Motorsport	BMW 320 TC		10	+13.026	3	12
5	11	(Denmark) Kristian Poulsen	Liqui Moly Team Engstler	BMW 320 TC	Y	10	+13.772	6	10
6	30	(Sweden) Robert Dahlgren	Polestar Racing	Volvo C30 Drive		10	+14.353	5	8
7	9	(Hong Kong) Darryl O'Young	bamboo-engineering	Chevrolet Cruze 1.6T	Y	10	+21.288	8	6
8	5	(Hungary) Norbert Michelisz	Zengő-Dension Team	BMW 320 TC	Y	10	+21.584	19	4
9	20	(Spain) Javier Villa	Proteam Racing	BMW 320 TC	Y	10	+23.436	11	2
10	17	(Denmark) Michel Nykjær	SUNRED Engineering	SUNRED SR León 1.6T	Y	10	+23.731	10	1
11	25	(Morocco) Mehdi Bennani	Proteam Racing	BMW 320 TC	Y	10	+24.146	12	
12	18	(Portugal) Tiago Monteiro	SUNRED Engineering	SUNRED SR León 1.6T		10	+27.624	17	
13	74	(Spain) Pepe Oriola	SUNRED Engineering	SUNRED SR León 1.6T	Y	10	+29.796	13	
14	4	(Russia) Aleksei Dudukalo	Lukoil-SUNRED	SEAT León 2.0 TDI	Y	10	+34.209	15	
15	10	(Japan) Yukinori Taniguchi	bamboo-engineering	Chevrolet Cruze 1.6T	Y	10	+34.828	14	
16	12	(Germany) Franz Engstler	Liqui Moly Team Engstler	BMW 320 TC	Y	10	+39.038	9	
17	35	(Switzerland) Urs Sonderegger	Wiechers-Sport	BMW 320 TC	Y	10	+1:08.893	16	
NC	3	(Italy) Gabriele Tarquini	Lukoil-SUNRED	SUNRED SR León 1.6T		6	+4 Laps	7	
Ret	7	(Switzerland) Fredy Barth	SEAT Swiss Racing by SUNRED	SUNRED SR León 1.6T	Y	3	Engine	18	

- **Bold** denotes Fastest lap.

=== Race 2 ===
Pos.	No.	Name	Team	Car	C	Laps	Time/Retired	Grid	Points
1	1	(France) **Yvan Muller**	Chevrolet RML	Chevrolet Cruze 1.6T		10	22:08.247	8	25
2	15	(Netherlands) Tom Coronel	ROAL Motorsport	BMW 320 TC		10	+4.183	3	18
3	8	(Switzerland) Alain Menu	Chevrolet RML	Chevrolet Cruze 1.6T		10	+4.415	6	15
4	2	(United Kingdom) Robert Huff	Chevrolet RML	Chevrolet Cruze 1.6T		10	+5.033	9	12
5	17	(Denmark) Michel Nykjær	SUNRED Engineering	SUNRED SR León 1.6T	Y	10	+8.450	1	10
6	3	(Italy) Gabriele Tarquini	Lukoil-SUNRED	SUNRED SR León 1.6T		10	+9.118	4	8
7	20	(Spain) Javier Villa	Proteam Racing	BMW 320 TC	Y	10	+9.381	11	6
8	11	(Denmark) Kristian Poulsen	Liqui Moly Team Engstler	BMW 320 TC	Y	10	+11.383	7	4
9	30	(Sweden) Robert Dahlgren	Polestar Racing	Volvo C30 Drive		10	+11.627	10	2
10	25	(Morocco) Mehdi Bennani	Proteam Racing	BMW 320 TC	Y	10	+11.988	12	1
11	74	(Spain) Pepe Oriola	SUNRED Engineering	SUNRED SR León 1.6T	Y	10	+19.966	13	
12	18	(Portugal) Tiago Monteiro	SUNRED Engineering	SUNRED SR León 1.6T		10	+21.209	17	
13	4	(Russia) Aleksei Dudukalo	Lukoil-SUNRED	SEAT León 2.0 TDI	Y	10	+22.252	15	
14	10	(Japan) Yukinori Taniguchi	bamboo-engineering	Chevrolet Cruze 1.6T	Y	10	+24.809	14	
15	5	(Hungary) Norbert Michelisz	Zengő-Dension Team	BMW 320 TC	Y	10	+42.517	18	
16	7	(Switzerland) Fredy Barth	SEAT Swiss Racing by SUNRED	SUNRED SR León 1.6T	Y	7	+3 Laps	19	
Ret	9	(Hong Kong) Darryl O'Young	bamboo-engineering	Chevrolet Cruze 1.6T	Y	5	Race incident	5	
Ret	12	(Germany) Franz Engstler	Liqui Moly Team Engstler	BMW 320 TC	Y	1	Turbo wastegate	2	
Ret	35	(Switzerland) Urs Sonderegger	Wiechers-Sport	BMW 320 TC	Y	0	Race incident	16	

- **Bold** denotes Fastest lap.

== Standings after the event ==
Drivers' Championship standings

	Pos	Driver	Points
	1	(United Kingdom) Robert Huff	187
	2	(France) Yvan Muller	162
	3	(Switzerland) Alain Menu	134
	4	(Italy) Gabriele Tarquini	83
1	5	(Netherlands) Tom Coronel	82

Yokohama Independents' Trophy standings

	Pos	Driver	Points
	1	(Denmark) Kristian Poulsen	67
	2	(Spain) Javier Villa	63
	3	(Hungary) Norbert Michelisz	53
	4	(Hong Kong) Darryl O'Young	49
1	5	(Denmark) Michel Nykjær	42

Manufacturers' Championship standings

Pos	Manufacturer	Points
1	(United States) Chevrolet	405
2	(Spain) SR Customer Racing	238
3	(Germany) BMW Customer Racing Teams	229
4	(Sweden) Volvo Polestar Evaluation Team	62

- Note: Only the top five positions are included for both sets of drivers' standings.
