= KK Motorsport =

Motor racing team

(China) KK Motorsport
- Team principal(s): CK Lo
- Current series: World Touring Car Championship

KK Motorsport is a motor racing team currently competing in the World Touring Car Championship. They run a BMW 320 TC for Marchy Lee. The team is owned and run by CK Lo. The team receives support from the Engstler Motorsport team, with Engstler's Kurt Treml acting as team manager for KK Motorsport. The team joined that World Touring Car Championship at the beginning of the 2011 season.

KK Motorsport entered the 2010 1000 km of Zhuhai with an Audi R8 LMS with Marchy Lee, Matthew Marsh and Alex Yoong. They finished the race 12th overall and won the GTC class.
