= 2013 Bathurst 12 Hour =

Endurance motor racing event

2013 Liqui Moly Bathurst 12 Hour

Seasons
- ← 2012 2014 →

Layout of the Mount Panorama Circuit

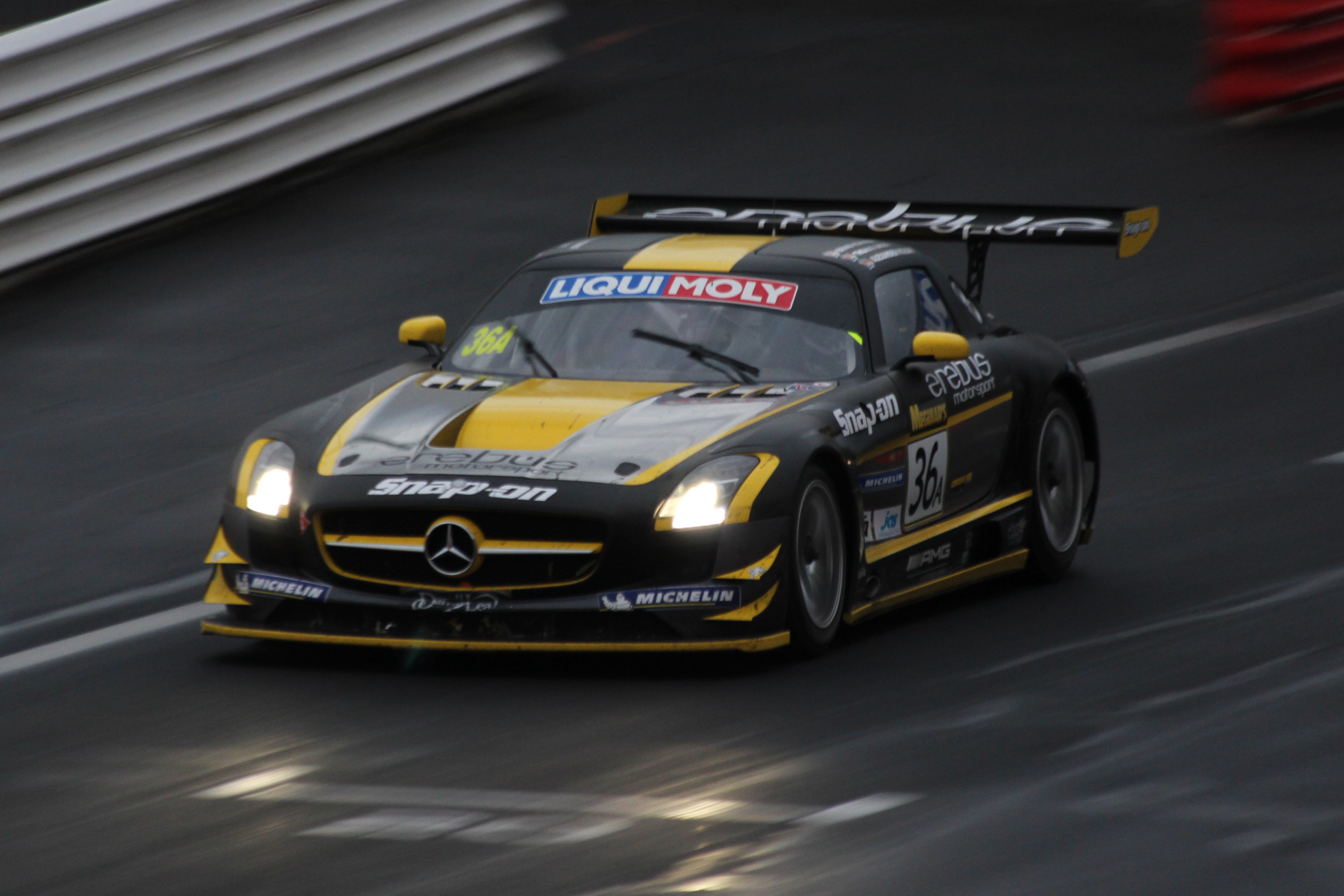
The race winning Mercedes-Benz SLS AMG of Thomas Jäger, Alexander Roloff and Bernd Schneider.

The 2013 Liqui Moly Bathurst 12 Hour was an endurance race for a variety of GT and touring car classes, including: GT3 cars, GT4 cars, Group 3E Series Production Cars and Dubai 24 Hour cars. The event, which was staged at the Mount Panorama Circuit, near Bathurst, New South Wales, Australia, on 10 February 2013, was the eleventh running of the Bathurst 12 Hour. The race also incorporated the opening round of the 2013 Australian GT Championship. The Australian GT Championship was to compete as the first hour only and cars were permitted to enter for only that hour or to cross-enter for both the first hour and continue for the endurance race. There were 53 starters in the race, the largest field since the Bathurst 12 Hour event moved to GT orientation in 2011.

The race was won by Thomas Jäger, Alexander Roloff and Bernd Schneider driving a Mercedes-Benz SLS AMG for Erebus Motorsport.

== Class structure ==
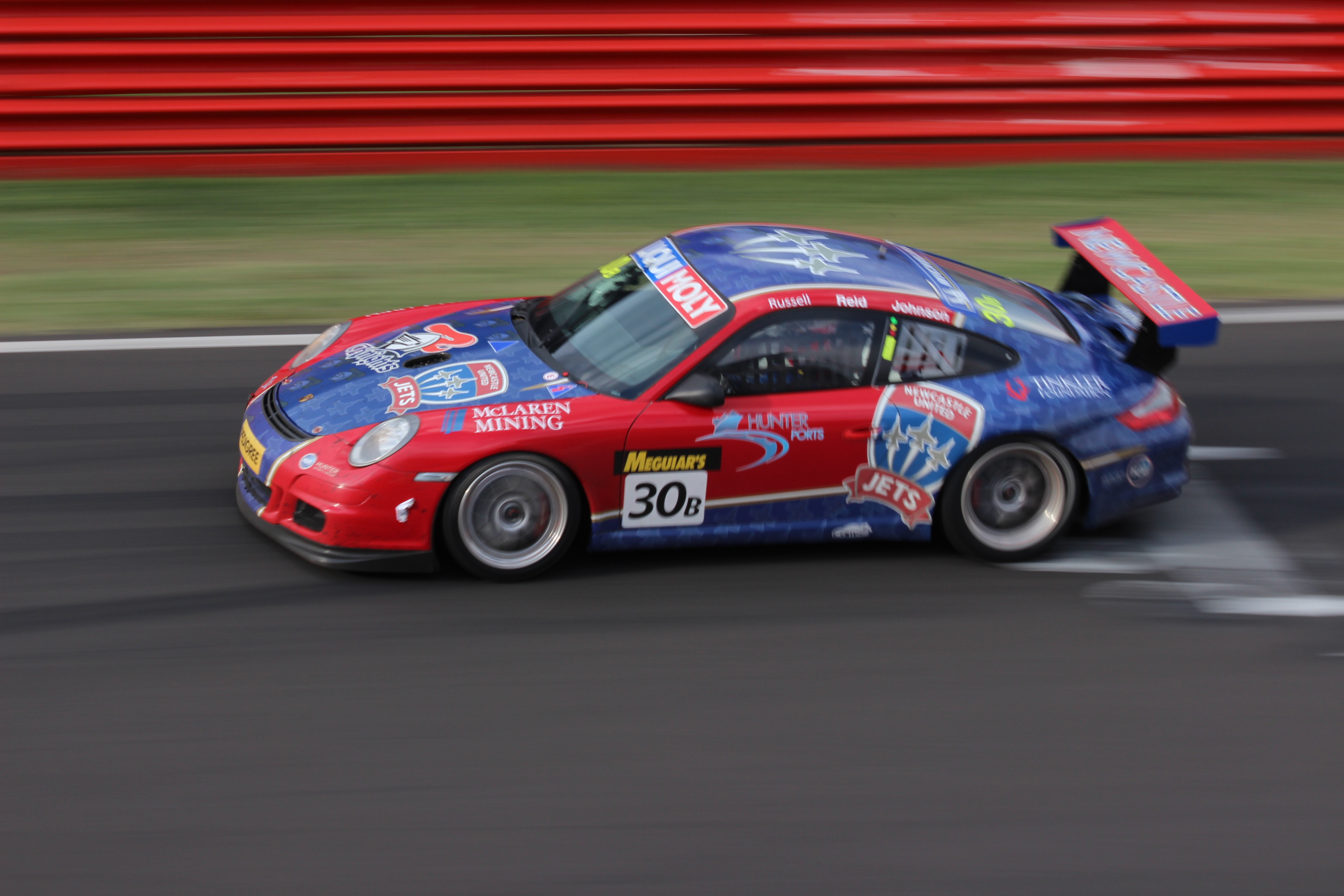
The Class B-winning Porsche 997 GT3 Cup of Steven Johnson, Jonny Reid and Drew Russell.

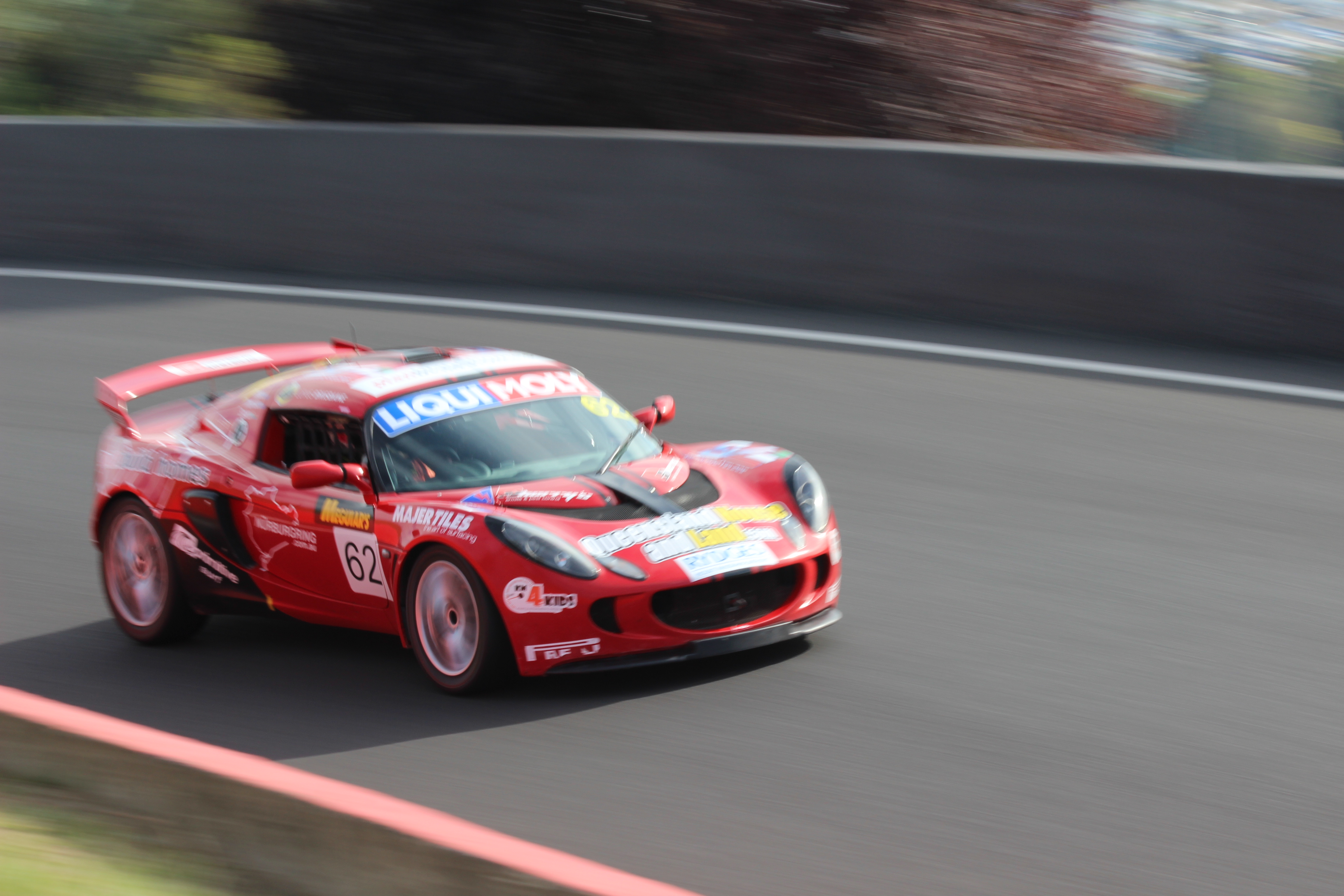
The Class C-winning Lotus Exige S of Romano Sartori, Liam Talbot and Rob Thomson.

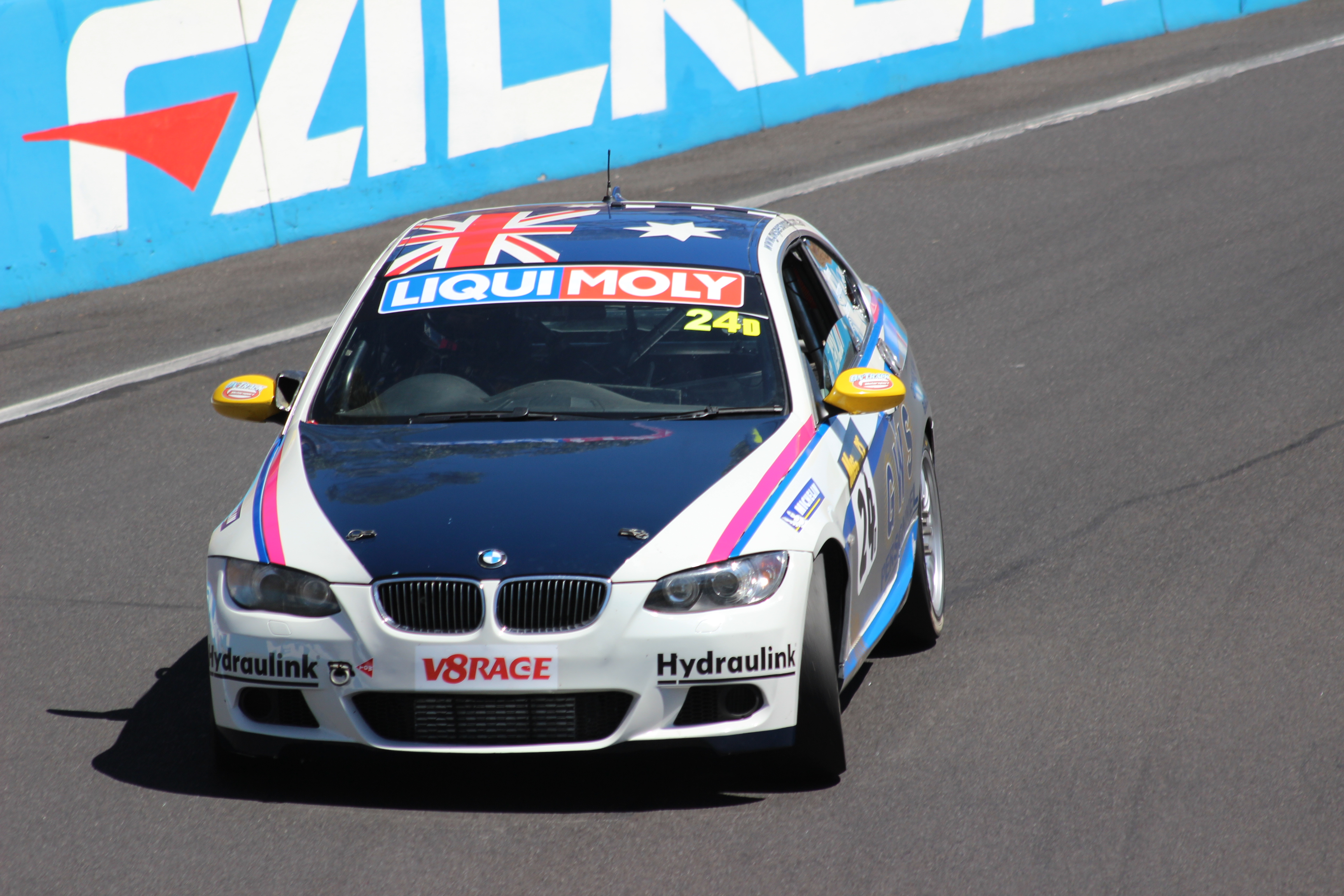
The Class D-winning BMW 335i of Anthony Gilbertson, Andre Heimgartner and Peter O'Donnell.

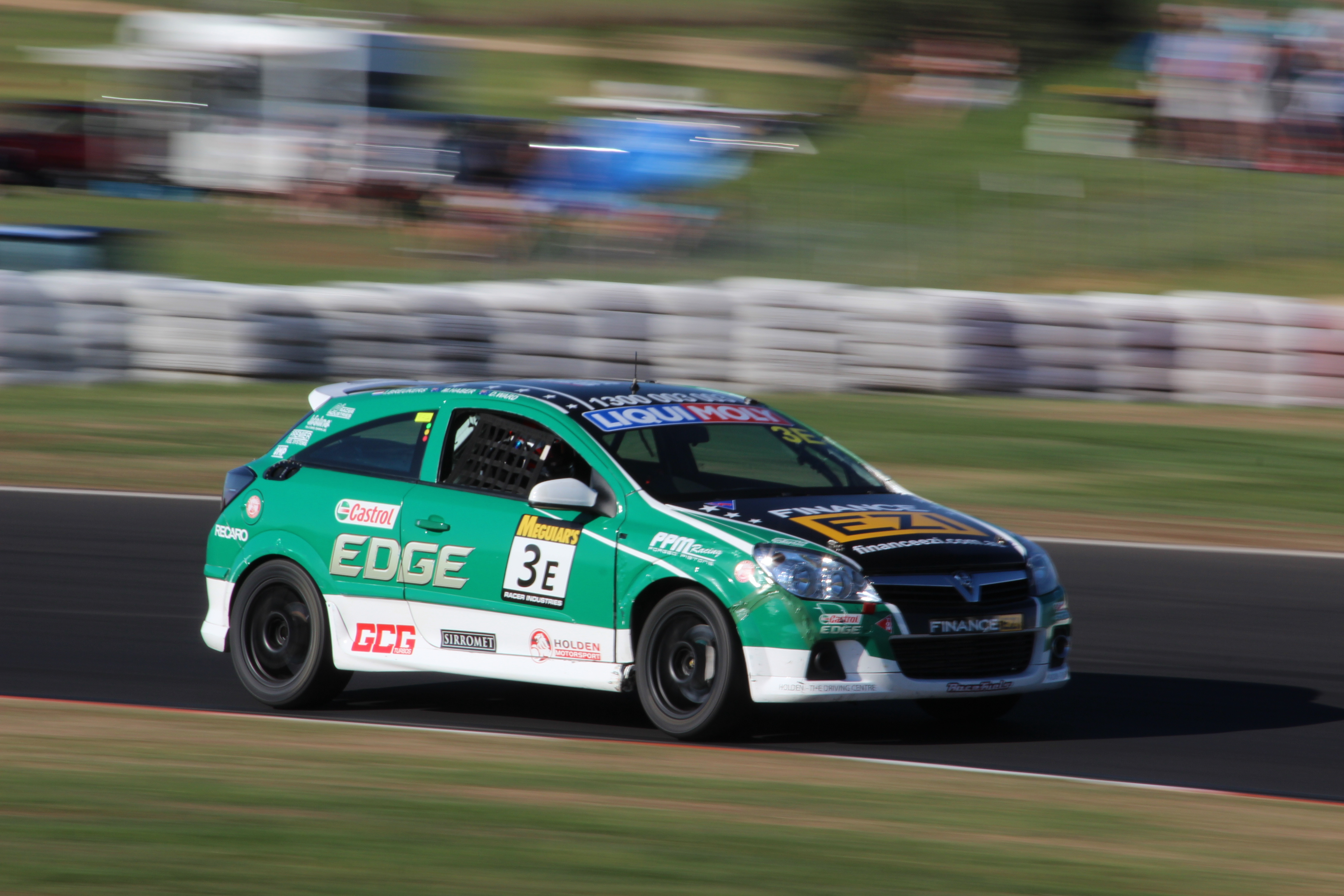
The Class E-winning HSV VXR Turbo of Ivo Breukers, Morgan Haber and Damian Ward.

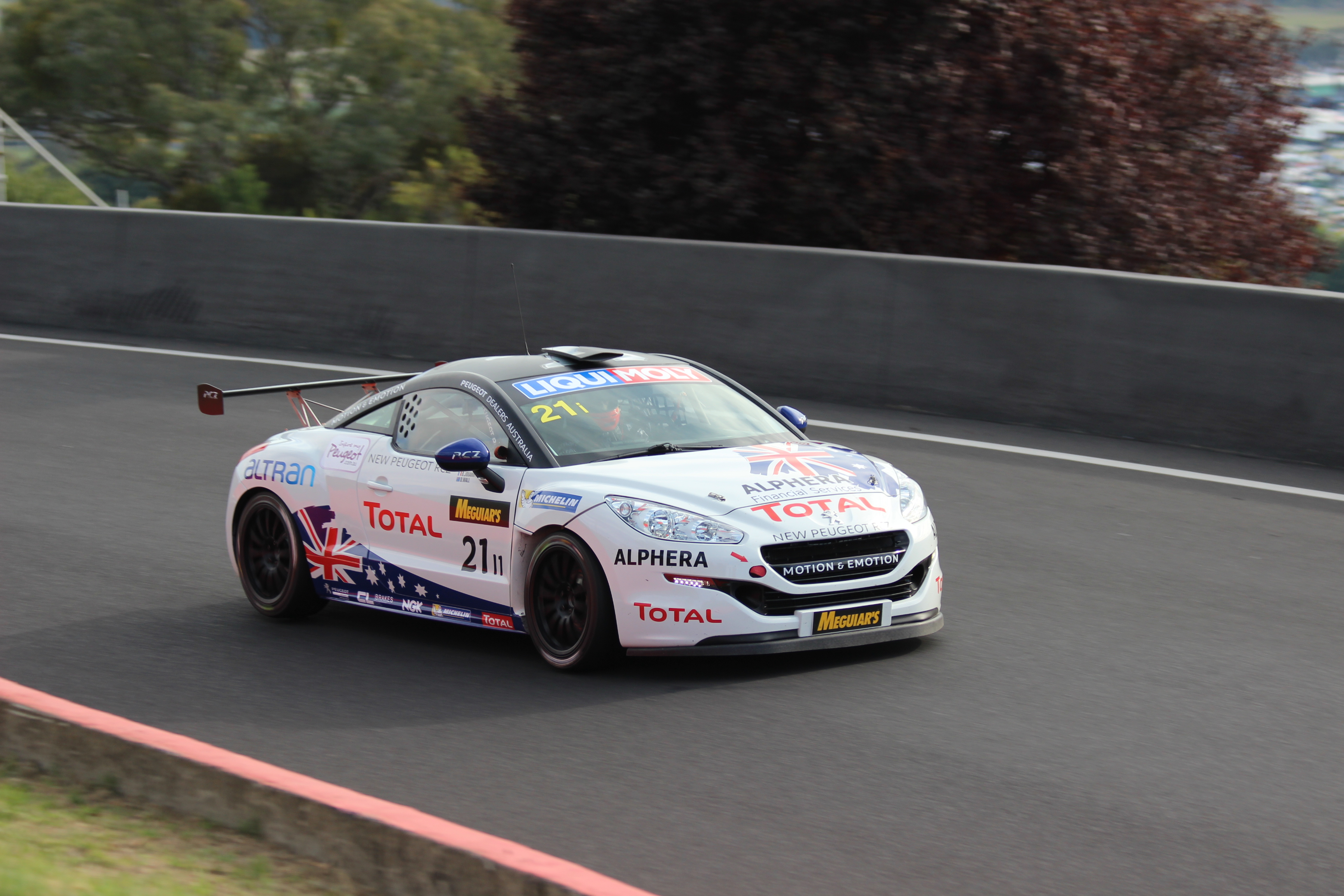
The Class I1-winning Peugeot RCZ Cup of Andrew Jones, Bruce Jouanny and David Wall.

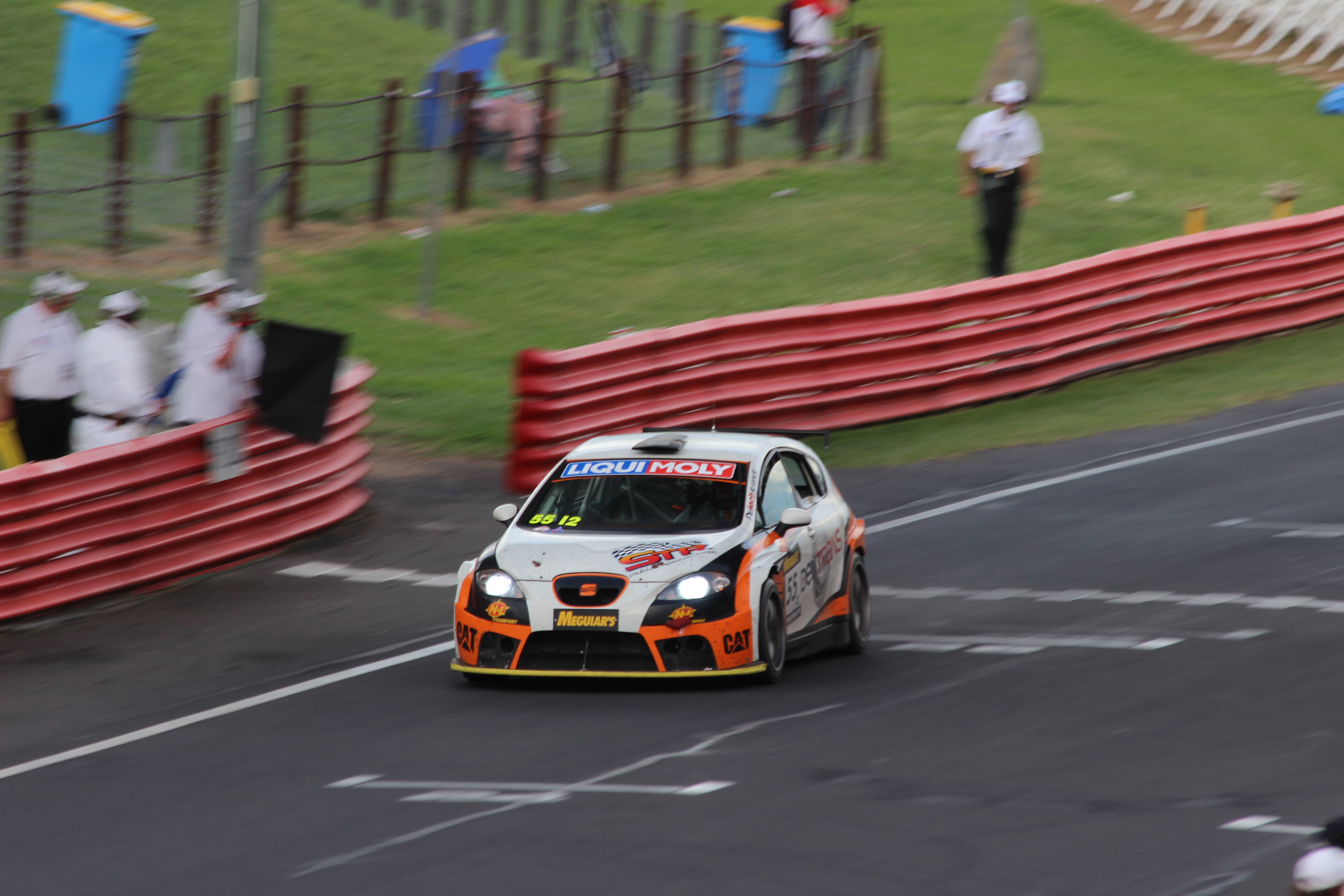
The Class I2-winning SEAT León Supercopa of Clint Harvey, Brett Niall and Malcolm Niall.

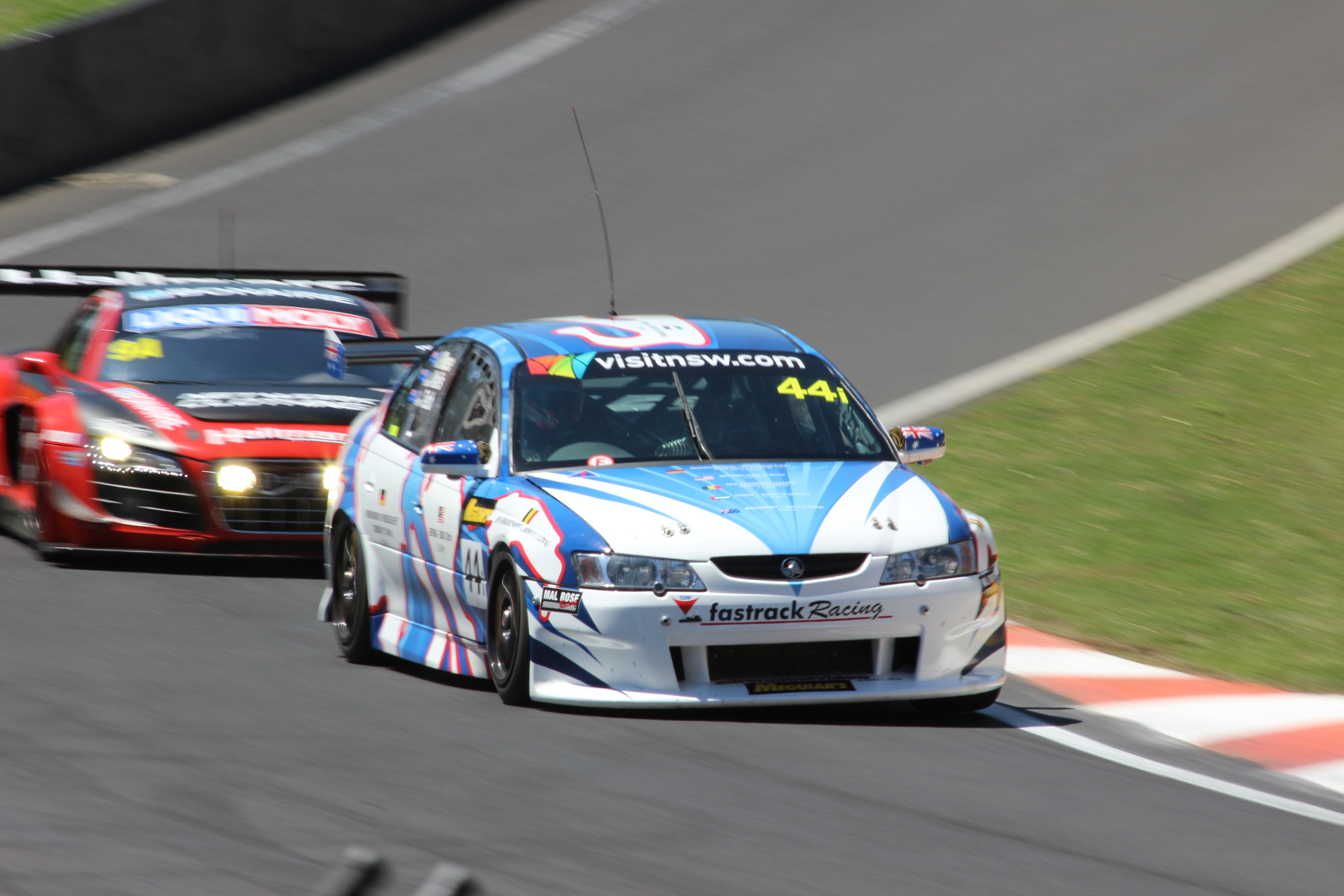
The Class I3-winning Holden VY Commodore of Mal Rose, Aaron Tebb and Adam Wallis.

Cars competed in the following six classes.

- Class A – GT3 Outright
- Class B – GT3 Cup Cars
- Class C – GT4
- Class D – Production (High Performance)
- Class E – Production (Performance)
- Class I1 – Invitational (under 3000cc)
- Class I2 – Invitational (between 3001cc & 4000cc)
- Class I3 – Invitational (over 4000cc)

Classes D & E were open to Group 3E Series Production Cars and Class I was for cars complying with the regulations for the 2013 Dubai 24 Hour race. There was also a provision for teams competing in the Australian GT Championship to race for the first 55 minutes of the race only, to compete for GT Championship points.

== Qualifying ==
Two qualifying sessions were run on Saturday 9 February with Danish driver Allan Simonsen setting the fastest time of 2:05.49 in the Maranello Motorsport entered Ferrari 458 GT3. However, as penalties are applied for lap times recorded under 2:06 minutes to provide a form of parity, the car lost the lap time and acquired a 50 kg penalty.

== Race ==
Driving a Mercedes-Benz SLS AMG for Erebus Motorsport, Germans Thomas Jäger, Alexander Roloff and former Formula One driver Bernd Schneider were the winners, covering 268 laps. The Ferrari 458 GT3 of Craig Baird, Matt Griffin and Weng Sun Mok finished a lap behind in second, with Griffin setting the fastest lap of the race with a lap of 2:06.8714. Finishing in third place was the VIP Petfoods Porsche 997 GT3-R of Matt Kingsley, Klark Quinn and Shane van Gisbergen.

A late afternoon rain storm caused havoc in the field as it started suddenly and most cars took a few laps to pit for wet weather tyres. Shane van Gisbergen, driving the Quinn Porsche, excelled in the wet conditions, passing several drivers across the top of the circuit despite the conditions. There were a number of safety cars in the wet conditions which caused the leaders to close up, with slower, lapped cars mixed in between. At one restart the #63 Erebus Motorsport SLS, which had been in contention for most of the race, clipped the #60 Lotus Elise and damaged the steering. The car was repaired but lost multiple laps, eventually finishing in sixth place.

Early in the day the two Aston Martins, Tony Quinn's DBRS9 in GT3 Class A, and the St Gallen Vantage GT4 of Baenziger, Kamelger and Porritt in Class C, had a coming together at the top of Conrod Straight. Quinn's race was ended and the Vantage GT4 recommenced racing, albeit many laps down. The #22 FPV FG GT of Robinson Racing Developments broke a supercharger pulley late in the day. The car was repaired using a part taken off a road car belonging to a crowd member, allowing the team to finish the race. The car recommenced racing in the last five laps and the team returned the borrowed part following the end of the race.

== Official result ==
Pos	Class	No	Team / Entrant	Drivers	Car	Laps	Time/Retired
Pos	Class	No	Team / Entrant	Drivers	Engine	Laps	Time/Retired
1	**A**	**36**	**(Australia) Erebus Motorsport**	**(Germany) Thomas Jäger (Germany) Alexander Roloff (Germany) Bernd Schneider**	**Mercedes-Benz SLS AMG**	**268**	**12:03:04.5192**
1	**A**	**36**	**(Australia) Erebus Motorsport**	**(Germany) Thomas Jäger (Germany) Alexander Roloff (Germany) Bernd Schneider**	**6.2 L Mercedes-Benz M159 V8**	**268**	**12:03:04.5192**
2	A	33	(Singapore) Clearwater Racing	(New Zealand) Craig Baird (Republic of Ireland) Matt Griffin (Singapore) Weng Sun Mok	Ferrari 458 Italia GT3	267	+1 lap
2	A	33	(Singapore) Clearwater Racing	(New Zealand) Craig Baird (Republic of Ireland) Matt Griffin (Singapore) Weng Sun Mok	4.5 L Ferrari F142 V8	267	+1 lap
3	A	5	(Australia) VIP Petfoods Racing	(Australia) Matt Kingsley (Australia) Klark Quinn (New Zealand) Shane van Gisbergen (United Kingdom) Tony Quinn^{1}	Porsche 997 GT3-R	267	+1 lap
3	A	5	(Australia) VIP Petfoods Racing	(Australia) Matt Kingsley (Australia) Klark Quinn (New Zealand) Shane van Gisbergen (United Kingdom) Tony Quinn^{1}	3.6 L Porsche H6	267	+1 lap
4	A	1	(Germany) Phoenix Racing	(Sweden) Johan Kristoffersson (Switzerland) Harold Primat (Sweden) Andreas Simonsen	Audi R8 LMS Ultra	266	+2 laps
4	A	1	(Germany) Phoenix Racing	(Sweden) Johan Kristoffersson (Switzerland) Harold Primat (Sweden) Andreas Simonsen	5.2 L FSI 2×DOHC Audi V10	266	+2 laps
5	A	9	(Australia) Hallmarc Racing	(Australia) Marc Cini (Australia) Mark Eddy (Australia) Dean Grant (Germany) Christopher Mies	Audi R8 LMS Ultra	263	+5 laps
5	A	9	(Australia) Hallmarc Racing	(Australia) Marc Cini (Australia) Mark Eddy (Australia) Dean Grant (Germany) Christopher Mies	5.2 L FSI 2×DOHC Audi V10	263	+5 laps
6	A	63	(Australia) Erebus Motorsport	(Australia) Peter Hackett (Australia) Lee Holdsworth (Australia) Tim Slade	Mercedes-Benz SLS AMG	263	+5 laps
6	A	63	(Australia) Erebus Motorsport	(Australia) Peter Hackett (Australia) Lee Holdsworth (Australia) Tim Slade	6.2 L Mercedes-Benz M159 V8	263	+5 laps
7	A	58	(Italy) AF Corse	(Italy) Marco Cioci (Italy) Michele Rugolo (Australia) Steve Wyatt	Ferrari 458 GT3	261	+7 laps
7	A	58	(Italy) AF Corse	(Italy) Marco Cioci (Italy) Michele Rugolo (Australia) Steve Wyatt	4.5 L Ferrari F142 V8	261	+7 laps
8	A	14	(Australia) Peter Conroy Motorsport	(Australia) Peter Conroy (United Kingdom) Robert Huff (United Kingdom) James Winslow	Audi R8 LMS	260	+8 laps
8	A	14	(Australia) Peter Conroy Motorsport	(Australia) Peter Conroy (United Kingdom) Robert Huff (United Kingdom) James Winslow	5.2 L FSI 2×DOHC Audi V10	260	+8 laps
9	**B**	**30**	**(Australia) Hunter Sports Group**	**(Australia) Steven Johnson (New Zealand) Jonny Reid (Australia) Drew Russell**	**Porsche 997 GT3 Cup**	**257**	**+11 laps**
9	**B**	**30**	**(Australia) Hunter Sports Group**	**(Australia) Steven Johnson (New Zealand) Jonny Reid (Australia) Drew Russell**	**3.6 L Porsche H6**	**257**	**+11 laps**
10	A	71	(Australia) Equity-One Racing	(Australia) Dean Koutsoumidis (Australia) Andrew McInnes (Australia) Simon Middleton (Hong Kong) Darryl O'Young	Audi R8 LMS	255	+13 laps
10	A	71	(Australia) Equity-One Racing	(Australia) Dean Koutsoumidis (Australia) Andrew McInnes (Australia) Simon Middleton (Hong Kong) Darryl O'Young	5.2 L FSI 2×DOHC Audi V10	255	+13 laps
11	B	4	(Australia) Grove Motorsport	(New Zealand) Daniel Gaunt (Australia) Stephen Grove (Australia) Max Twigg	Porsche 997 GT3 Cup	251	+17 laps
11	B	4	(Australia) Grove Motorsport	(New Zealand) Daniel Gaunt (Australia) Stephen Grove (Australia) Max Twigg	3.6 L Porsche H6	251	+17 laps
12	**I3**	**44**	**(Australia) Mal Rose Racing**	**(Australia) Mal Rose (Australia) Aaron Tebb (Australia) Adam Wallis**	**Holden VY Commodore**	**248**	**+20 laps**
12	**I3**	**44**	**(Australia) Mal Rose Racing**	**(Australia) Mal Rose (Australia) Aaron Tebb (Australia) Adam Wallis**	**5.0 L Holden Aurora V8**	**248**	**+20 laps**
13	A	48	(Australia) M Motorsport	(Australia) Ross Lilley (Australia) Justin McMillan (New Zealand) Steven Richards	Lamborghini Gallardo LP560	247	+21 laps
13	A	48	(Australia) M Motorsport	(Australia) Ross Lilley (Australia) Justin McMillan (New Zealand) Steven Richards	5.2 L Lamborghini V10	247	+21 laps
14	B	69	(New Zealand) Motorsport Services	(New Zealand) Allan Dippie (New Zealand) George McFarlane (New Zealand) Scott O'Donnell	Porsche 997 GT3 Cup	244	+24 laps
14	B	69	(New Zealand) Motorsport Services	(New Zealand) Allan Dippie (New Zealand) George McFarlane (New Zealand) Scott O'Donnell	3.6 L Porsche H6	244	+24 laps
15	B	8	(Belgium) Level Racing	(Belgium) Philippe Broodcoren (Belgium) Kurt Dujardyn (Belgium) Olivier Muytjens (France) Philippe Richard	Porsche 997 GT3 Cup	236	+32 laps
15	B	8	(Belgium) Level Racing	(Belgium) Philippe Broodcoren (Belgium) Kurt Dujardyn (Belgium) Olivier Muytjens (France) Philippe Richard	3.6 L Porsche H6	236	+32 laps
16	**I1**	**21**	**(Australia) Team Peugeot RCZ**	**(Australia) Andrew Jones (France) Bruce Jouanny (Australia) David Wall**	**Peugeot RCZ Cup**	**233**	**+35 laps**
16	**I1**	**21**	**(Australia) Team Peugeot RCZ**	**(Australia) Andrew Jones (France) Bruce Jouanny (Australia) David Wall**	**1.6 L Peugeot THP156 I4 turbo**	**233**	**+35 laps**
17	A	81	(United States) DragonSpeed	(Ecuador) Elton Julian (United States) Eric Lux (Germany) Christian Zügel	Audi R8 LMS Ultra	233	+35 laps
17	A	81	(United States) DragonSpeed	(Ecuador) Elton Julian (United States) Eric Lux (Germany) Christian Zügel	5.2 L FSI 2×DOHC Audi V10	233	+35 laps
18	**E**	**3**	**(Australia) Racer Industries**	**(Netherlands) Ivo Breukers (Australia) Morgan Haber (Australia) Damian Ward**	**HSV VXR Turbo**	**229**	**+39 laps**
18	**E**	**3**	**(Australia) Racer Industries**	**(Netherlands) Ivo Breukers (Australia) Morgan Haber (Australia) Damian Ward**	**2.0 L Ecotec I4**	**229**	**+39 laps**
19	**C**	**62**	**(Australia) Rob Thomson Racing**	**(Australia) Romano Sartori (Australia) Liam Talbot (Australia) Rob Thomson**	**Lotus Exige S**	**228**	**+40 laps**
19	**C**	**62**	**(Australia) Rob Thomson Racing**	**(Australia) Romano Sartori (Australia) Liam Talbot (Australia) Rob Thomson**	**1.8 L Supercharged Toyota ZZ I4**	**228**	**+40 laps**
20	**I2**	**55**	**(New Zealand) Motorsport Services**	**(Australia) Clint Harvey (Australia) Brett Niall (Australia) Malcolm Niall**	**SEAT León Supercopa**	**225**	**+43 laps**
20	**I2**	**55**	**(New Zealand) Motorsport Services**	**(Australia) Clint Harvey (Australia) Brett Niall (Australia) Malcolm Niall**	**2.0 L SEAT I4**	**225**	**+43 laps**
21	I2	17	(New Zealand) Showershop Racing	(New Zealand) Tony Burrowes (New Zealand) Stuart Owers (New Zealand) Lewis Scott	Subaru Impreza WRX STi	222	+46 laps
21	I2	17	(New Zealand) Showershop Racing	(New Zealand) Tony Burrowes (New Zealand) Stuart Owers (New Zealand) Lewis Scott	2.0 L Subaru H4	222	+46 laps
22	C	54	(Australia) Donut King Racing	(Australia) Tony Alford (Australia) Adam Beechey (Australia) Peter Leemhuis	Nissan R35 GT-R	214	+54 laps
22	C	54	(Australia) Donut King Racing	(Australia) Tony Alford (Australia) Adam Beechey (Australia) Peter Leemhuis	3.8 L Twin-turbo VR38DETT V6	214	+54 laps
23	I1	20	(Australia) Team Peugeot RCZ	(Australia) Jason Bright (France) Stéphane Caillet (France) Julien Rueflin	Peugeot RCZ Cup	214	+54 laps
23	I1	20	(Australia) Team Peugeot RCZ	(Australia) Jason Bright (France) Stéphane Caillet (France) Julien Rueflin	1.6 L Peugeot THP156 I4 turbo	214	+54 laps
24	B	67	(New Zealand) Motorsport Services	(New Zealand) David Glasson (New Zealand) Phil Hood (New Zealand) Tony Richards	Porsche 997 GT3 Cup	208	+60 laps
24	B	67	(New Zealand) Motorsport Services	(New Zealand) David Glasson (New Zealand) Phil Hood (New Zealand) Tony Richards	3.6 L Porsche H6	208	+60 laps
25	B	45	(Australia) Team BRM	(Australia) Barton Mawer (Australia) Duvashen Padayachee (Australia) Indiran Padayachee (Australia) Aaron Zerefos	Porsche 997 GT3 Cup	207	+61 laps
25	B	45	(Australia) Team BRM	(Australia) Barton Mawer (Australia) Duvashen Padayachee (Australia) Indiran Padayachee (Australia) Aaron Zerefos	3.6 L Porsche H6	207	+61 laps
26	E	26	(Australia) GWS Personnel Motorsport	(Australia) Daniel Lewis (Australia) Daniel Stutterd (Australia) Jonathon Venter	BMW 130i	207	+61 laps
26	E	26	(Australia) GWS Personnel Motorsport	(Australia) Daniel Lewis (Australia) Daniel Stutterd (Australia) Jonathon Venter	3.0 L BMW N52 I6	207	+61 laps
27	B	68	(New Zealand) Motorsport Services	(New Zealand) Terry Knight (New Zealand) Jeff Lowrey (New Zealand) Marcus Mahy (New Zealand) Todd Murphy	Porsche 997 GT3 Cup	198	+70 laps
27	B	68	(New Zealand) Motorsport Services	(New Zealand) Terry Knight (New Zealand) Jeff Lowrey (New Zealand) Marcus Mahy (New Zealand) Todd Murphy	3.6 L Porsche H6	198	+70 laps
28	I2	70	(New Zealand) Motorsport Services	(New Zealand) Mike Driver (New Zealand) Sam Fillmore (New Zealand) Kevin Gallichan (New Zealand) Aaron Harris	SEAT León Supercopa	193	+75 laps
28	I2	70	(New Zealand) Motorsport Services	(New Zealand) Mike Driver (New Zealand) Sam Fillmore (New Zealand) Kevin Gallichan (New Zealand) Aaron Harris	2.0 L SEAT I4	193	+75 laps
29	**D**	**24**	**(Australia) GWS Personnel Motorsport**	**(Australia) Anthony Gilbertson (New Zealand) Andre Heimgartner (Australia) Peter O'Donnell**	**BMW 335i**	**183**	**+85 laps**
29	**D**	**24**	**(Australia) GWS Personnel Motorsport**	**(Australia) Anthony Gilbertson (New Zealand) Andre Heimgartner (Australia) Peter O'Donnell**	**3.0 L BMW N54 Twin-turbo I6**	**183**	**+85 laps**
30	I2	35	(Australia) Ric Shaw Racing	(Australia) Andrew Bollom (Australia) Stephen Borness (Australia) James Parish (Australia) Ric Shaw	Mazda RX-7	182	+86 laps
30	I2	35	(Australia) Ric Shaw Racing	(Australia) Andrew Bollom (Australia) Stephen Borness (Australia) James Parish (Australia) Ric Shaw	1.3 L Mazda 13B-REW Twin-turbo Two-Rotor	182	+86 laps
31	E	27	(Australia) GWS Personnel Motorsport	(Australia) Justin Garioch (Australia) Allan Shephard (Australia) Dylan Thomas	BMW 130i	176	+92 laps
31	E	27	(Australia) GWS Personnel Motorsport	(Australia) Justin Garioch (Australia) Allan Shephard (Australia) Dylan Thomas	3.0 L BMW N52 I6	176	+92 laps
32	I2	56	(New Zealand) Motorsport Services	(Australia) Simon Piavanini (Australia) Mark Pilatti (Australia) Kerry Wade	SEAT León Supercopa	140	+128 laps
32	I2	56	(New Zealand) Motorsport Services	(Australia) Simon Piavanini (Australia) Mark Pilatti (Australia) Kerry Wade	2.0 L SEAT I4	140	+128 laps
33	C	76	(Switzerland) Aston Martin St. Gallen	(Switzerland) Andreas Baenziger (Austria) Florian Kamelger (United Kingdom) Christopher Porritt	Aston Martin Vantage GT4	140	+128 laps
33	C	76	(Switzerland) Aston Martin St. Gallen	(Switzerland) Andreas Baenziger (Austria) Florian Kamelger (United Kingdom) Christopher Porritt	4.7 L Aston Martin V8	140	+128 laps
34	D	22	(Australia) Robinson Racing Developments	(Australia) Steve Cramp (Australia) Brad Goss (Australia) Vin Stenta	FPV FG GT	134	+134 laps
34	D	22	(Australia) Robinson Racing Developments	(Australia) Steve Cramp (Australia) Brad Goss (Australia) Vin Stenta	5.0 L Boss 315 supercharged V8	134	+134 laps
DNF	A	23	(United States) United Autosports	(New Zealand) Brendon Hartley (Hong Kong) Alain Li (United States) Mark Patterson	Audi R8 LMS Ultra	259	Crash
DNF	A	23	(United States) United Autosports	(New Zealand) Brendon Hartley (Hong Kong) Alain Li (United States) Mark Patterson	5.2 L FSI 2×DOHC Audi V10	259	Crash
DNF	I1	60	(United Kingdom) Motionsport	(United Kingdom) Ben Gower (United Kingdom) Simon Phillips (United Kingdom) Pete Storey	Lotus Elise	211	Crash
DNF	I1	60	(United Kingdom) Motionsport	(United Kingdom) Ben Gower (United Kingdom) Simon Phillips (United Kingdom) Pete Storey	1.8 L Supercharged Toyota ZZ I4	211	Crash
DNF	I3	13	(Australia) Bruce Lynton BMW	(Australia) Andrew Fisher (Australia) Beric Lynton (Australia) Matt Mackelden	BMW M3	209	Crash
DNF	I3	13	(Australia) Bruce Lynton BMW	(Australia) Andrew Fisher (Australia) Beric Lynton (Australia) Matt Mackelden	3.2 L BMW S54 I6	209	Crash
DNF	B	12	(United States) Competition Motorsports	(Australia) David Calvert-Jones (Australia) Alex Davison (Australia) James Davison	Porsche 997 GT3 Cup R	207	Crash
DNF	B	12	(United States) Competition Motorsports	(Australia) David Calvert-Jones (Australia) Alex Davison (Australia) James Davison	3.8 L Porsche H6	207	Crash
DNF	A	6	(Australia) Rod Salmon Racing	(Australia) Craig Lowndes (Australia) Warren Luff (Australia) Rod Salmon	Audi R8 LMS	162	Hub failure
DNF	A	6	(Australia) Rod Salmon Racing	(Australia) Craig Lowndes (Australia) Warren Luff (Australia) Rod Salmon	5.2 L FSI 2×DOHC Audi V10	162	Hub failure
DNF	D	7	(Australia) Maximum Motorsport	(Australia) Dean Herridge (Australia) Angus Kennard (Australia) John O'Dowd	Subaru Impreza WRX STi	138	Crash
DNF	D	7	(Australia) Maximum Motorsport	(Australia) Dean Herridge (Australia) Angus Kennard (Australia) John O'Dowd	2.5 L Subaru H4	138	Crash
DNF	I2	2	(Australia) Racer Industries	(Australia) Jake Camilleri (Papua New Guinea) Keith Kassulke (Australia) Ryan McLeod	HSV VXR Turbo	133	Suspension
DNF	I2	2	(Australia) Racer Industries	(Australia) Jake Camilleri (Papua New Guinea) Keith Kassulke (Australia) Ryan McLeod	2.2 L Ecotec I4	133	Suspension
DNF	I3	65	(Australia) Daytona Sports Cars	(Australia) Jamie Augustine (Australia) Andrew Miedecke (Australia) Benjamin Schoots	Daytona Sportscar	132	Crash
DNF	I3	65	(Australia) Daytona Sports Cars	(Australia) Jamie Augustine (Australia) Andrew Miedecke (Australia) Benjamin Schoots	6.0 L GM LS1 V8 engine	132	Crash
DNF	A	29	(Australia) Trofeo Motorsport	(Italy) Ivan Capelli (Australia) Jim Manolios (New Zealand) Greg Murphy	Chevrolet Corvette Z06-R	127	Fuel Tank
DNF	A	29	(Australia) Trofeo Motorsport	(Italy) Ivan Capelli (Australia) Jim Manolios (New Zealand) Greg Murphy	7.0 L GM LS7 V8	127	Fuel Tank
DNF	A	88	(Australia) Maranello Motorsport	(Australia) John Bowe (Australia) Peter Edwards (Finland) Mika Salo (Denmark) Allan Simonsen	Ferrari 458 GT3	111	Crash
DNF	A	88	(Australia) Maranello Motorsport	(Australia) John Bowe (Australia) Peter Edwards (Finland) Mika Salo (Denmark) Allan Simonsen	4.5 L Ferrari F142 V8	111	Crash
DNF	C	10	(Australia) Simply Sports Cars	(Australia) Adam Gowans (United Kingdom) Chris Lillingston-Price (United Kingdom) Richard Meins	Lotus Exige S	108	Crash
DNF	C	10	(Australia) Simply Sports Cars	(Australia) Adam Gowans (United Kingdom) Chris Lillingston-Price (United Kingdom) Richard Meins	1.8 L Supercharged Toyota ZZ I4	108	Crash
DNF	D	19	(Australia) Sherrin Rentals	(Australia) David Ayers (Australia) Grant Sherrin (Australia) Iain Sherrin (Australia) Mike Sherrin	BMW 135i	67	Engine
DNF	D	19	(Australia) Sherrin Rentals	(Australia) David Ayers (Australia) Grant Sherrin (Australia) Iain Sherrin (Australia) Mike Sherrin	3.0 L BMW N55 Twin-turbo I6	67	Engine
DNF	A	51	(Australia) AMAC Motorsport	(Australia) Andrew MacPherson (Australia) Benjamin Porter (Australia) Garth Walden	Mosler MT900 GT3	55	Overheating
DNF	A	51	(Australia) AMAC Motorsport	(Australia) Andrew MacPherson (Australia) Benjamin Porter (Australia) Garth Walden	7.0 L GM LS7 V8	55	Overheating
DNF	A	16	(Germany) Liqui Moly Team Engstler	(Germany) Franz Engstler (Australia) John Modystach (Hong Kong) Charles Ng (Denmark) Kristian Poulsen	BMW Z4 GT3	36	Crash
DNF	A	16	(Germany) Liqui Moly Team Engstler	(Germany) Franz Engstler (Australia) John Modystach (Hong Kong) Charles Ng (Denmark) Kristian Poulsen	4.4 L BMW S65 V8	36	Crash
DNF	AUS; GT	40	(Australia) Motor School Racing	(Australia) Ben Foessel	Porsche 996 GT3 Cup	13	Withdrawn after opening hour
DNF	AUS; GT	40	(Australia) Motor School Racing	(Australia) Ben Foessel	3.6 L Porsche H6	13	Withdrawn after opening hour
DNF	AUS; GT	73	(Australia) ESP Print Management Racing	(Australia) Michael Hovey	Ginetta G50 G4	13	Withdrawn after opening hour
DNF	AUS; GT	73	(Australia) ESP Print Management Racing	(Australia) Michael Hovey	3.5 L Ford Cyclone engine V6	13	Withdrawn after opening hour
DNF	AUS; GT	77	(Australia) VIP Holdings (Aust) Pty Ltd	(United Kingdom) Tony Quinn	Aston Martin DBRS9	11	Crash
DNF	AUS; GT	77	(Australia) VIP Holdings (Aust) Pty Ltd	(United Kingdom) Tony Quinn	5.7 L Aston Martin V12	11	Crash
DNF	A	11	(Australia) Lago Racing	(Netherlands) Peter Kox (Australia) Roger Lago (Australia) David Russell	Lamborghini Gallardo LP560	11	Crash
DNF	A	11	(Australia) Lago Racing	(Netherlands) Peter Kox (Australia) Roger Lago (Australia) David Russell	5.2 L Lamborghini V10	11	Crash
DNF	AUS; GT	38	(Australia) Griffith Corporation P/L	(Australia) Mark Griffith	Ginetta G50 G4	5	Crash
DNF	AUS; GT	38	(Australia) Griffith Corporation P/L	(Australia) Mark Griffith	3.5 L Ford Cyclone engine V6	5	Crash
DNS	D	80	(Australia) Bruce Lynton BMW	(Australia) Andrew Fisher (Australia) Beric Lynton (Australia) Matt Mackelden	BMW 1M	0	Electrical issues (moved to car #13 for remainder of the event)
DNS	D	80	(Australia) Bruce Lynton BMW	(Australia) Andrew Fisher (Australia) Beric Lynton (Australia) Matt Mackelden	3.0 L BMW N54 turbocharged I6	0	Electrical issues (moved to car #13 for remainder of the event)

^1 – Tony Quinn was unable to drive in the race following a crash during the first hour of the race. He was replaced by Matt Kingsley.

- Note: Class winners are shown in Bold
- Race time of winning car: 12:03:4.5192
- Fastest race lap: 2:06.8714 – Matt Griffin
