= 2008 Porsche Carrera Cup Asia =

Motorsport racing season

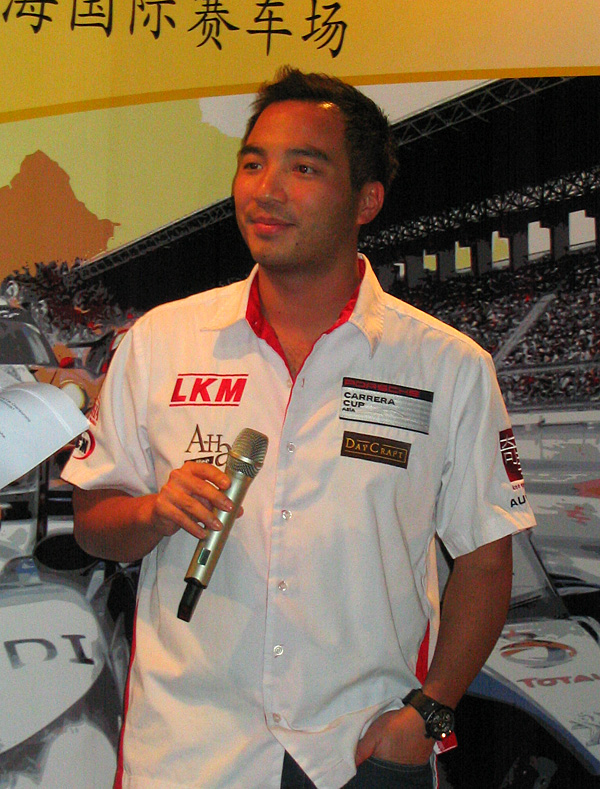
Darryl O'Young won his second Porsche Carrera Cup Asia championship

The 2008 Porsche Carrera Cup Asia was the sixth season of the Porsche Carrera Cup Asia. The season commenced on March 21 at the Sepang International Circuit and finished at the Bahrain International Circuit on November 8.

A consistent campaign from Darryl O'Young saw the Team Jebsen driver become the first multi-time champion in the history of the championship. The Class B championship was won by Tunku Hammam of Malaysia.

== Calendar ==
The following venues hosted at least one round of the 2008 championship.

| Round | Circuit | Date | Supporting |
|---|---|---|---|
| 1 | Sepang International Circuit, Selangor, Malaysia | 21–23 March | Malaysian Grand Prix; GP2 Asia Series; Formula BMW Pacific |
| 2 | Shanghai International Circuit, Shanghai, China | 19–20 April | Asian Formula Renault Challenge |
| 3 | Zhuhai International Circuit, Zhuhai, China | 21–22 June | Stand-alone event |
| 4 | Sentul International Circuit, Sentul City, Indonesia | 18–20 July | Formula V6 Asia Championship; Asian Touring Car Series; Formula BMW Pacific |
| 5 | Marina Bay Street Circuit, Marina Bay, Singapore | 26–28 September | Singapore Grand Prix; Formula BMW Pacific |
| 6 | Shanghai International Circuit, Shanghai, China | 17–19 October | Chinese Grand Prix; GP2 Asia Series; Formula BMW Pacific |
| 7 | Bahrain International Circuit, Sakhir, Bahrain | 6–8 November | V8 Supercar Championship Series |

== Teams and drivers ==
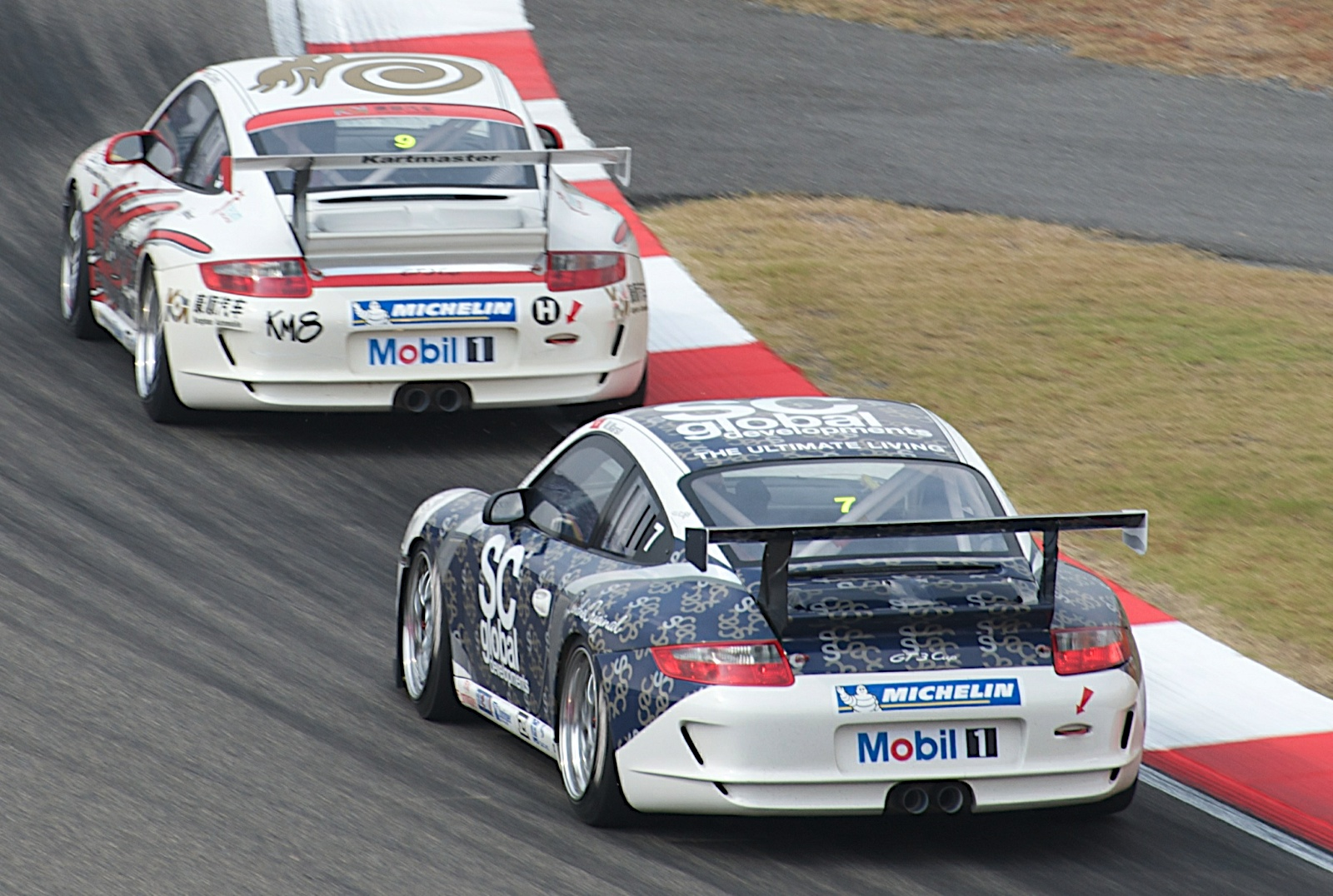
Matthew Marsh chases down Ringo Chong in Shanghai.

| Team | No. | Driver | Class | Rounds |
|---|---|---|---|---|
| Team Vertu | 5 | (Singapore) Yuey Tan | B | 6–7 |
| Speed Sri Lanka | 6 | (Sri Lanka) Dilantha Malagamuwa | | 1–2, 4–7 |
| SC Global Racing | 7 | (Hong Kong) Matthew Marsh | | All |
| Team Betterlife | 8 | (Hong Kong) Marchy Lee | | All |
| Team Kungshun | 9 | (Singapore) Ringo Chong | | All |
| Sunseeker Asia | 11 | (Hong Kong) Alain Li | | All |
| PTRS | 15 | (Chinese Taipei) Jeffrey Lee | | 3–7 |
| Stichting Chu Racing Team | 16 | (Netherlands) Danny Chu | | All |
| Team Opes Prime | 18 | (Australia) Christian Jones | | All |
| Pelorus Property Group / Assetz | 23 | (Australia) Paul Tresidder | B | All |
| Team PCS Racing | 28 | (Singapore) Greg Teo | B | 2, 4–5, 7 |
| Team PCS Racing | 28 | (Singapore) Gerald Teo | B | 1, 3, 6 |
| Team PCS Racing | 32 | (Singapore) Ian Tan Mao | B | 3 |
| Team PCS Racing | 32 | (Singapore) David Lai | B | 1–2, 5–6 |
| Team PCS Racing | 32 | (Singapore) Henry Tse | B | 4 |
| Team PCS Racing | 33 | (Singapore) Weng Mok Sun | | 1–4, 6–7 |
| Echo Ridges Wines | 38 | (Australia) Greg Ward | B | 1–3 |
| Arrows Racing Team | 51 | (Malaysia) Tunku Hammam | B | All |
| Team Jebsen | 55 | (Hong Kong) Darryl O'Young | | All |
| ThunderAsia Racing | 69 | (Singapore) Melvin Choo | B | All |
| GruppeM Racing | 88 | (United Kingdom) Tim Sugden | | All |
| Philip Ma Racing | 98 | (Hong Kong) Philip Ma | B | 1, 3–6 |
| Philip Ma Racing | 98 | (Hong Kong) Samson Chan | | 2 |
| Philip Ma Racing | 98 | (United States) Michael Kim | B | 7 |
| Team StarChase | 99 | (Germany) Christian Menzel | | All |

| Icon | Class |
|---|---|
| B | B Class |
| | Guest Starter |

== Results ==
| Round | | Circuit | Pole Position | Overall Winner | B-Class Pole Position | B-Class Winner |
|---|---|---|---|---|---|---|
| 1 | R1 | (Malaysia) Sepang | (United Kingdom) Tim Sugden | (Germany) Christian Menzel | (Singapore) Melvin Choo | (Malaysia) Tunku Hammam |
| 1 | R2 | (Malaysia) Sepang | | (Hong Kong) Darryl O'Young | | (Malaysia) Tunku Hammam |
| 2 | R1 | (China) Shanghai 1 | (Germany) Christian Menzel | (United Kingdom) Tim Sugden | (Singapore) Melvin Choo | (Singapore) Melvin Choo |
| 2 | R2 | (China) Shanghai 1 | | (Germany) Christian Menzel | | (Singapore) Melvin Choo |
| 3 | R1 | (China) Zhuhai | (Australia) Christian Jones | (Australia) Christian Jones | (Singapore) Melvin Choo | (Singapore) Melvin Choo |
| 3 | R2 | (China) Zhuhai | | (Australia) Christian Jones | | (Singapore) Melvin Choo |
| 4 | R1 | (Indonesia) Sentul | (United Kingdom) Tim Sugden | (Hong Kong) Darryl O'Young | (Hong Kong) Philip Ma | (Hong Kong) Philip Ma |
| 4 | R2 | (Indonesia) Sentul | | (United Kingdom) Tim Sugden | | (Malaysia) Tunku Hammam |
| 5 | | Singapore | (United Kingdom) Tim Sugden | (Hong Kong) Darryl O'Young | (Malaysia) Tunku Hammam | (Singapore) Melvin Choo |
| 6 | | (China) Shanghai 2 | (United Kingdom) Tim Sugden | (Germany) Christian Menzel | (Singapore) Melvin Choo | (Malaysia) Tunku Hammam |
| 7 | R1 | Bahrain | (Germany) Christian Menzel | (Hong Kong) Darryl O'Young | (Singapore) Melvin Choo | (Singapore) Melvin Choo |
| 7 | R2 | Bahrain | | (Germany) Christian Menzel | | (Malaysia) Tunku Hammam |

== Championship standings ==
=== Scoring system ===
Points were awarded to the top fifteen classified drivers in every race, using the following system:

| Position | 1st | 2nd | 3rd | 4th | 5th | 6th | 7th | 8th | 9th | 10th | 11th | 12th | 13th | 14th | 15th | Pole |
| Points | 20 | 18 | 16 | 14 | 12 | 10 | 9 | 8 | 7 | 6 | 5 | 4 | 3 | 2 | 1 | 1 |

=== Overall ===
| Pos. | Driver | SEP (Malaysia) | | SHA1 (China) | | ZHU (China) | | SEN (Indonesia) | | SIN (Singapore) | SHA2 (China) | BHR (Bahrain) | | Points |
|---|---|---|---|---|---|---|---|---|---|---|---|---|---|---|
| 1 | (Hong Kong) Darryl O'Young | 3 | 1 | 3 | 3 | 3 | 3 | 1 | 2 | 1 | 16 | 1 | 2 | 196 |
| 2 | (Germany) Christian Menzel | 1 | 2 | 2 | 1 | 5 | Ret | 3 | 5 | 2 | 1 | 2 | 1 | 194 |
| 3 | (United Kingdom) Tim Sugden | 5 | DNS | 1 | 2 | 2 | 2 | 2 | 1 | 5 | 4 | 3 | 3 | 186 |
| 4 | (Australia) Christian Jones | 4 | 3 | 4 | 4 | 1 | 1 | 5 | 3 | 3 | 2 | 4 | 13 | 178 |
| 5 | (Hong Kong) Marchy Lee | 2 | 4 | 5 | 5 | 4 | Ret | 4 | 4 | Ret | 3 | 5 | 4 | 140 |
| 6 | (Hong Kong) Matthew Marsh | 6 | 5 | 6 | 6 | 6 | 4 | 6 | 6 | Ret | 6 | 7 | 5 | 117 |
| 7 | (Sri Lanka) Dilantha Malagamuwa | 7 | 6 | 7 | 8 | | | 7 | Ret | 4 | 5 | 6 | 6 | 91 |
| 8 | (Hong Kong) Alain Li | 8 | 7 | 8 | 7 | Ret | 13 | 8 | 9 | 6 | Ret | 10 | 8 | 76 |
| 9 | (Singapore) Weng Mok Sun | 13 | 9 | 12 | 13 | 7 | 5 | 13 | 12 | | 8 | 8 | 7 | 70 |
| 10 | (Singapore) Ringo Chong | 16 | 10 | Ret | 9 | Ret | 7 | 10 | 7 | 8 | 7 | 9 | 9 | 68 |
| 11 | (Malaysia) Tunku Hammam | 9 | 8 | Ret | 15 | 9 | 11 | 12 | 10 | 9 | 9 | 12 | 11 | 61 |
| 12 | (Singapore) Melvin Choo | 12 | 12 | 11 | 10 | 8 | 6 | 14 | 11 | 7 | Ret | 11 | Ret | 58 |
| 13 | (Netherlands) Danny Chu | 15 | 14 | 10 | 11 | 15 | 9 | 9 | 8 | Ret | 12 | 15 | 10 | 49 |
| 14 | (Hong Kong) Philip Ma | 11 | 11 | | | 10 | 8 | 11 | 13 | 11 | 11 | | | 42 |
| 15 | (Australia) Paul Tresidder | 10 | 15 | 13 | Ret | 11 | 10 | 16 | 15 | 10 | 10 | 14 | 13 | 41 |
| 16 | (Chinese Taipei) Jeffery Lee | | | | | 13 | 14 | 15 | 14 | 12 | Ret | 16 | 17 | 13 |
| 17 | (Hong Kong) Samson Chan | | | 9 | 12 | | | | | | | | | 11 |
| 18 | (Australia) Greg Ward | 14 | 13 | Ret | 14 | 14 | 16 | | | | | | | 9 |
| 19 | (Singapore) Ian Tan Mao | | | | | 11 | 11 | | | | | | | 8 |
| 20 | (Singapore) David Lai | 17 | Ret | 14 | Ret | | | | | 13 | 14 | | | 7 |
| 21 | (Singapore) Yuey Tan | | | | | | | | | | 13 | 17 | 15 | 5 |
| 22 | (Singapore) Greg Teo | | | 15 | 16 | | | 16 | 16 | Ret | | 18 | 16 | 2 |
| 23 | (Singapore) Gerald Teo | 18 | 16 | | | Ret | 15 | | | | 15 | | | 2 |
| 24 | (Singapore) Henry Tse | | | | | | | Ret | 16 | | | | | 0 |
Guest drivers ineligible for points
| - | (United States) Michael Kim | | | | | | | | | | | 13 | 12 | 0 |
| Pos. | Driver | SEP (Malaysia) | | SHA1 (China) | | ZHU (China) | | SEN (Indonesia) | | SIN (Singapore) | SHA2 (China) | BHR (Bahrain) | | Points |

=== Class B ===
| Pos. | Driver | SEP (Malaysia) | | SHA1 (China) | | ZHU (China) | | SEN (Indonesia) | | SIN (Singapore) | SHA2 (China) | BHR (Bahrain) | | Points |
|---|---|---|---|---|---|---|---|---|---|---|---|---|---|---|
| 1 | (Malaysia) Tunku Hammam | 1 | 1 | Ret | 3 | 2 | 4 | 2 | 1 | 2 | 1 | 2 | 1 | 203 |
| 2 | (Singapore) Melvin Choo | 4 | 3 | 1 | 1 | 1 | 1 | 3 | 2 | 1 | Ret | 1 | Ret | 189 |
| 3 | (Australia) Paul Tresidder | 2 | 5 | 2 | Ret | 4 | 3 | 4 | 4 | 3 | 2 | 3 | 2 | 174 |
| 4 | (Hong Kong) Philip Ma | 3 | 2 | | | 3 | 2 | 1 | 3 | 4 | 3 | | | 135 |
| 5 | (Singapore) Greg Teo | | | 4 | 4 | | | 5 | 5 | Ret | | 5 | 4 | 78 |
| 6 | (Australia) Greg Ward | 5 | 4 | Ret | 2 | 6 | 7 | | | | | | | 54 |
| 7 | (Singapore) David Lai | 6 | Ret | 3 | Ret | | | | | 5 | 5 | | | 50 |
| 8 | (Singapore) Yuey Tan | | | | | | | | | | 4 | 4 | 3 | 44 |
| 9 | (Singapore) Gerald Teo | 7 | 6 | | | Ret | 6 | | | | 6 | | | 39 |
| 10 | (Singapore) Ian Tan Mao | | | | | 4 | 4 | | | | | | | 24 |
| 11 | (Singapore) Henry Tse | | | | | | | Ret | 6 | | | | | 10 |
Guest drivers ineligible for points
| - | (United States) Michael Kim | | | | | | | | | | | 13 | 12 | 0 |
| Pos. | Driver | SEP (Malaysia) | | SHA1 (China) | | ZHU (China) | | SEN (Indonesia) | | SIN (Singapore) | SHA2 (China) | BHR (Bahrain) | | Points |

== See also ==
- 2008 Porsche Supercup
- 2008 Porsche Carrera Cup Germany
- 2008 Porsche Carrera Cup Great Britain
- 2008 Australian Carrera Cup Championship
