= Darryl O'Young =

Hong Kong racing driver (born 1980)

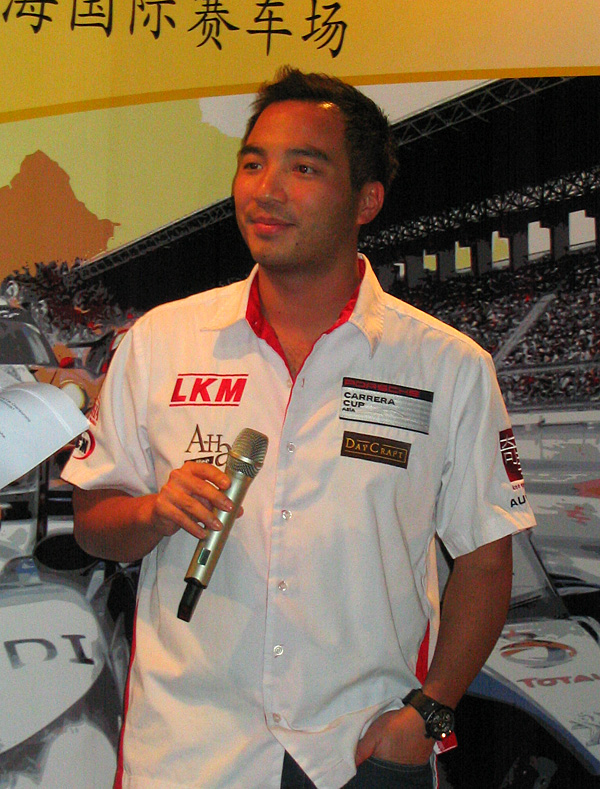
- O'Young in 2010
- Nationality: Hong Kong
- Born: Darryl Hayden O'Young; March 26, 1980 (age 46) Vancouver, British Columbia, Canada

FIA World Endurance Championship career
- Debut season: 2014
- Current team: Aston Martin Racing
- Categorisation: FIA Gold (until 2014, 2016–2017); FIA Silver (2015, 2018–)
- Car number: 55
- Starts: 6
- Wins: 0
- Poles: 0
- Fastest laps: 0
- Best finish: 13th (LMGTE Pro) in 2014

Previous series
- 2015 2015 2014 2013 2010 2011–2013 2010–13 2009 2008 2008–2009 2007 2004–2011 2002–2003 2001 2001: FIA GT World Cup; GT Asia Series; FIA World Endurance Championship; Dubai 24 Hour; DTM; Bathurst 12 Hour; WTCC; FIA GT Championship; Malaysia Merdeka Endurance Race; Macau GT Cup; Porsche Supercup; Porsche Carrera Cup Asia; USA Formula Renault 1600 Pro; Chinese Formula Ford 2000; Canadian Formula Ford 1600

Championship titles
- 2023 2015 2011, 2012 2006, 2008: Greater Bay Area GT Cup (GT3); GT Asia Series; Bathurst 12 Hour; Porsche Carrera Cup Asia
- Statistics up to date as of 12 February 2013.

24 Hours of Le Mans career
- Years: 2009, 2013 -
- Teams: Endurance Asia Team, Interush
- Best finish: 2nd (2013)
- Class wins: 0

Darryl Hayden O'Young (Chinese: 歐陽若曦; pinyin: Ōuyáng Ruòxī; Jyutping: Ngau^{1}joeng^{4} Joek^{6}hei^{1}) is a Canadian-born Hong Kong businessman, team owner, driver manager and former racing driver.

== Career ==
=== Early career ===
O'Young began racing in 1988 at the age of eight. Trained by his father, he honed his driving skills in karting winning numerous championships. The highlight of his karting career was becoming Canadian National Champion and USA National Champion in the same year.

After Formula Ford 1600 and 2000, O'Young progressed into Fran Am Pro 1600 and 2000 in the United States.

=== Sportscars ===
O'Young, then 24-years old, competed in the Porsche Infineon Carrera Cup Asia driving for Jebsen & Co, the Hong Kong Porsche dealer team, tasting his first major international success in 2005 winning his first Macau Grand Prix title.

O'Young is best known for his 20 appearances at his home race, the Macau Grand Prix between 2004 and 2025 in various categories including the Porsche Carrera Cup Asia, Macau GT Cup, World Touring Car Championship, and the FIA GT World Cup. He has won the race overall five times, whilst also taking two class victories in the World Touring Car Championship Independents class.

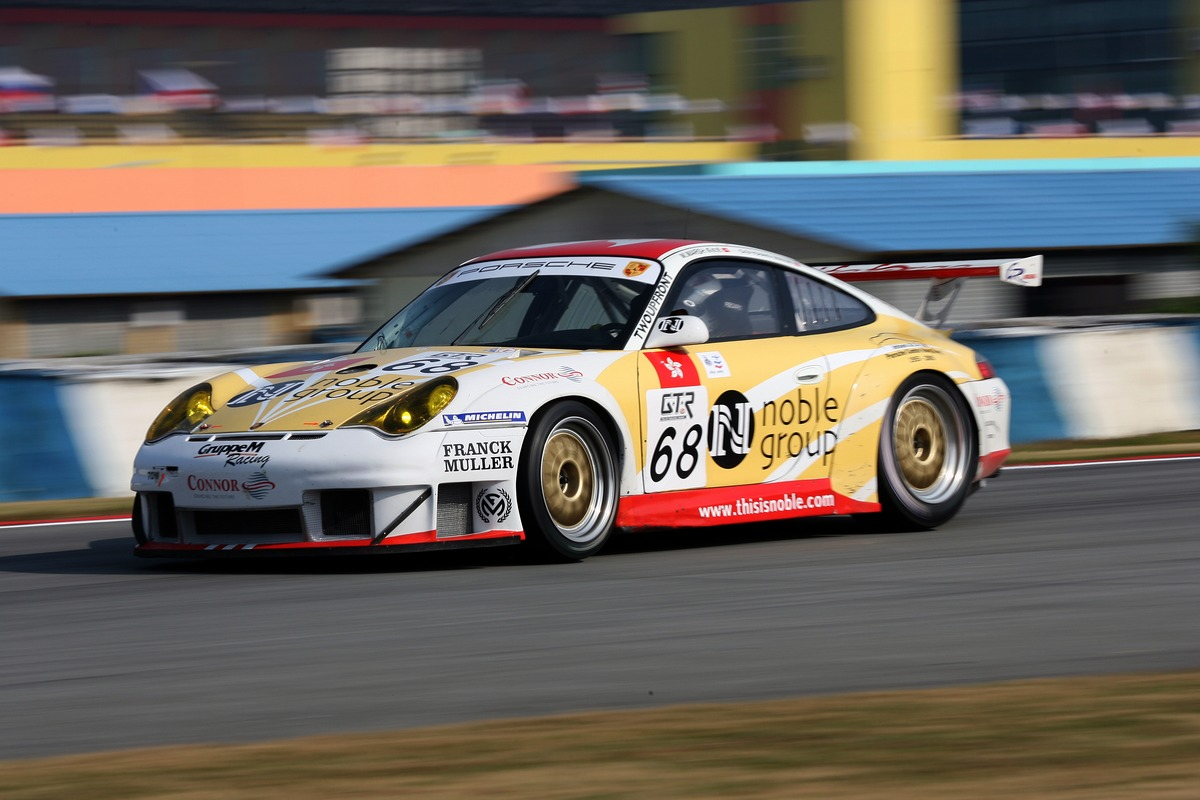
Darryl shares the Porsche 996 GT3 RSR with Matthew Marsh in Zhuhai.

In 2005, O'Young was invited to join the Hong Kong Le Mans Team set up by Matthew Marsh. The pair raced a Porsche 911 GT3 RSR in the Le Mans Endurance Series.

O'Young also took part in the 2005 FIA GT Championship - China Round race at the Zhuhai International Circuit, since the Hong Kong Le Mans Team entered the race as part of its 2005 programme. The pair finished fourth in the GT2 class.

In 2006, O'Young joined Renauer Motorsport for his first of several Spa 24 Hours race appearances in the Porsche 911 GT3 RSR. His best finish came in the Spa 24hrs came in 2009, finishing fifth in the GT2 class with Prospeed Competition alongside Richard Westbrook, Emmanuel Collard, and Sean Edwards.

On 22 October 2006, O'Young took his first championship title in Porsche Carrera Cup Asia after winning both races at the Zhuhai International Circuit.

For 2007, O'Young joined Schnabl Engineering - LKM - Team Jebsen to take part in the Porsche Mobil 1 Supercup. He was the first Hong Kong driver to take part in the European series.

For 2008, O'Young competed in both Porsche Supercup and Porsche Carrera Cup Asia. He was crowned series champion after the final race at Bahrain International Circuit. He had 196 points and four wins in the season. He became the first-ever double champion in the Porsche Carrera Cup Asia.

O'Young also competed in the Merdeka Millennium Endurance Race in Malaysia. Driving for Porsche Club Singapore, he won the race with Mok Wing Sun and Alexander Nicholas Davison. The trio completed 308 laps in 12 hours in their Porsche 997 RSR.

O'Young completed a motor racing hat-trick on 16 November 2008, when he took top honors at the Windsor Arch Macau GT Cup, driving a Porsche 997 GT3 Cup. He beats Danny Watts by more than two seconds. This was the third time he has won in a Porsche in Macau.

In 2009, O'Young announced that he would compete the entire 2009 FIA GT Championship season. He drove in the GT2 category in a Porsche GT3 RSR partnered with Porsche Junior Driver, Marco Holzer, with Belgium-based Prospeed Competition, the official Porsche factory-supported team in the FIA GT championship. In doing so, he was the first Chinese race driver to compete a full championship in the FIA GT.

In 2009, O'Young also competed in the Porsche Carrera Cup Asia for Team Jebsen, his sixth and final season for the team, where he finished third overall in the championship standings at the end of the year.

In addition, in 2009, O'Young entered the 24 hours of Le Mans for the first time in his career driving a Porsche GT3 RSR. The Chinese driver spearheaded the driver line up made up of Phillip Hesnault of France and Plamen Kralev of Bulgaria. He drove for the first ever Hong Kong team entry, Endurance Asia Team which was managed by Thierry Perrier. The team was the first ever Hong Kong/Chinese team entry in the race's 77-year history. The car broke down after 16 hours and was unclassified.

At the end of 2009, O'Young was invited for his first ARCA Stock Car Test on the Daytona International Speedway. He completed a successful test for Starbeast Motorsport while sharing a car that day with ex-Formula 1 driver, Narain Karthikeyan.

In 2010, O'Young made his first out of six appearances at the 24 hours of Daytona in his career, driving a Porsche GT3 Cup for Vancouver-based, Bullet Racing owned by Steve Paquette. The driver line-up included Ross Bentley, Sean McIntosh, and ex-Porsche factory driver Kees Nierop. They ran as high as third place in class and 14th overall near the 13th hour mark of the race, but an incident during the night after an off track excursion by one of the drivers ended all hopes of race victory for the team. They completed the race 20th overall and 13th in the GT class.

On 6 February 2011, O'Young drove for Audi Sport Team Joest in the 2011 Bathurst 12 Hour held at the Mount Panorama Circuit in Bathurst, Australia. Driving an Audi R8 LMS GT3, O'Young, along with Marc Basseng and Christopher Mies led home teammates Mark Eddy, Craig Lowndes and Warren Luff in a 1-2 finish. The winning margin only 0.7141 at the end of 12 hours or racing on the 6.213 km mountain circuit. It was his first of two Bathurst 12 Hour outright victories.

On 26 February 2012, O'Young drove a Phoenix Racing Audi R8 LMS to victory in the 2012 Armor All Bathurst 12 Hour held at the Mount Panorama Circuit in Bathurst, Australia.

O'Young took on the 24 Hours of Le Mans endurance race starting on 22 June 2013, his second appearance at the event. He drove the No. 55 INTERUSH AF Corse Ferrari 458 Italia, partnered by Italian drivers Lorenzo Casè and Piergiuseppe Perazzini. O'Young was competing at Le Mans for the second time in his career and scored a second place podium finish in the Pro-Am class. He finished the enduro in second place in the GTE Am class after starting from tenth on the grid. "I am very proud to put Hong Kong on the Le Mans podium," O’Young commented.

In 2014, O'Young and the newly merged Craft-Bamboo Racing entered the FIA World Endurance Championship with Aston Martin Racing, sharing the #99 entry with British driver Alex MacDowall and Brazilian Fernando Rees. The team endured a challenging season with a third-place finish in Fuji their best results. The team also entered the 2014 24 Hours of Le Mans, but had to withdraw from the race after a practice accident by Fernando Rees and the car was beyond repair in-time for the main race.

O'Young returned to the Asian racing scene by entering an Aston Martin Vantage V12 GT3 in 2014 Macau GT Cup, partnering a new major sponsor, Vitasoy. He finished ninth in the race.

In 2015, O'Young entered the 2015 GT Asia Series with Craft-Bamboo Racing. Sharing the No. 99 car with Australian Jonathan Venter and Daniel Lloyd and claimed a total of four wins en route to the Drivers' Championship title. He again entered the Vita Lemon Tea sponsored Aston Martin to the 2015 Macau GT Cup, this time the inaugural FIA GT World Cup. He finished fifth after Edoardo Mortara was penalized post race.

O'Young retired from racing after the 2025 Macau Grand Prix, in the Greater Bay Area GT Cup where he made his 20th and final appearance on the Guia Circuit.

=== World Touring Car Championship ===
==== Bamboo Engineering (2010–2011) ====
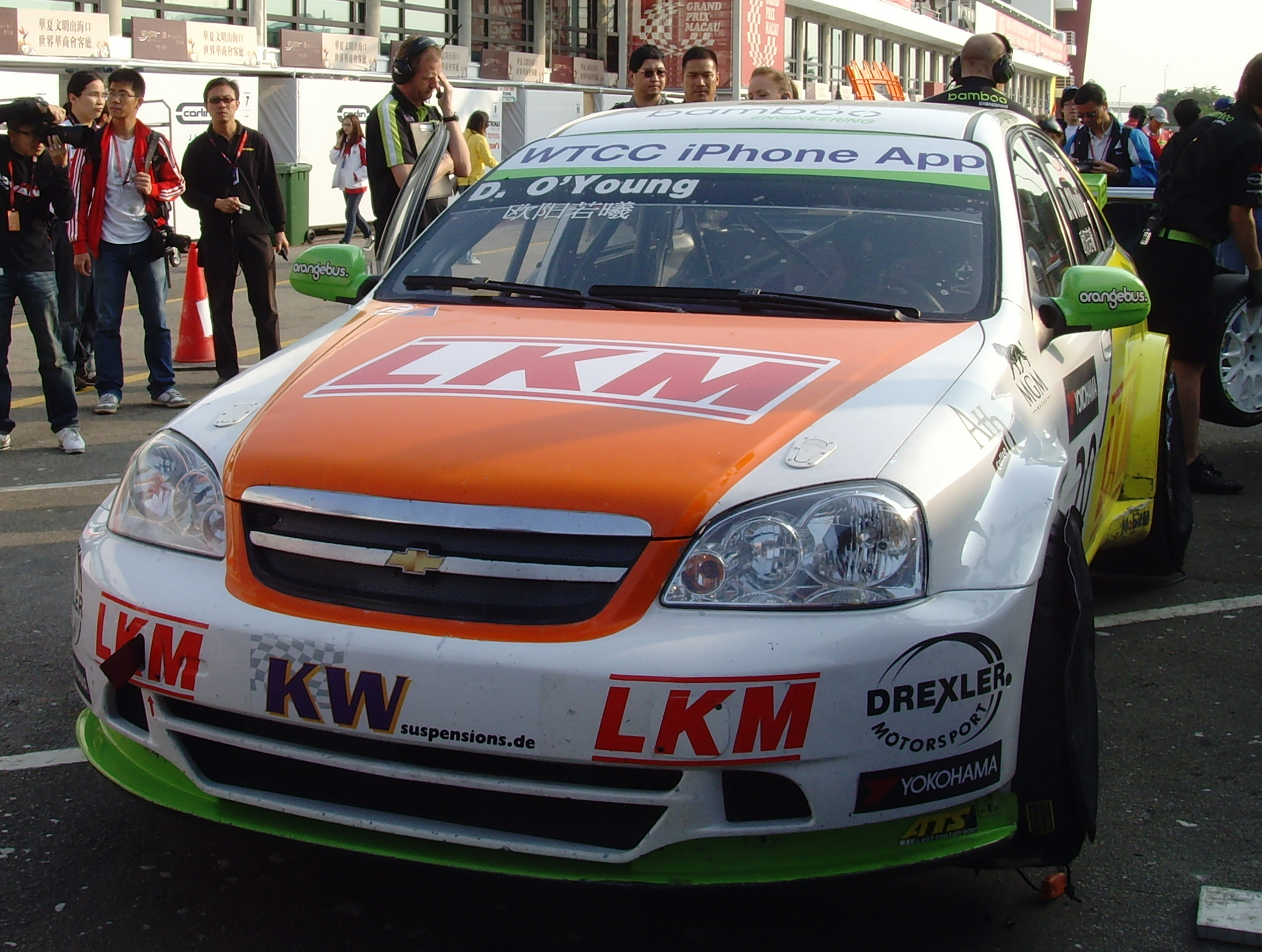
Darryl O'Young's Chevrolet Lacetti in Macau.

In 2010, O'Young came across an opportunity to compete at the top level of touring cars, and drove for Bamboo Engineering in the 2010 World Touring Car Championship season, as teammate to Harry Vaulkhard. His longtime sponsors LKM and A-Ha Coffee joined O'Young on his switch to touring cars, and additional support came from Chevrolet Motorsport. He drove a 2008–spec Chevrolet Lacetti in the Independents Championship of the WTCC. In doing so, he has also become the first Chinese full-time driver in the FIA World Touring Car Championship. In race ten at Race of Portugal, O'Young scored his first win in the Independents Championship and also his first world championship point by finishing tenth overall. He arrived in Macau for the final round with a chance of winning the Independents Championship, but was hit by Tom Coronel from behind in race one, thus failing to finish and ending his championship hopes.

O'Young remained with Bamboo Engineering for the 2011 World Touring Car Championship season. He started from pole position in race two at Suzuka Circuit in Japan, but he made a slow start and was hit from the back by Gabriele Tarquini. He ran into the sand trap and retired from the race.

==== Special Tuning Racing and Bamboo Engineering (2012) ====
O'Young moved to the new Special Tuning Racing team for 2012, driving one of their SEAT León WTCCs. He missed the races of the season opening Race of Italy after a fire in the Sunday morning warm–up session. He stopped the car and evacuated but the damage was ruled him out of participating in the rest of the weekend. A race one clash with Charles Ng at the Race of Austria required O'Young to receive attention at the circuit medical centre and he was forced to miss race two. He was caught up in a pileup at the start of the opening race of the Race of the United States but was able to continue and finished fourteenth, two places up on his starting position. Prior to the Race of Japan, he left Special Tuning Racing and returned to bamboo–engineering for the final rounds of the season. He was caught up in another pileup at the Race of China but continued, he retired on lap six after an incident. He had a head-on collision with the barriers in testing for Race of Macau, stopping the session just before the end. He went on to the take the independents' pole position in qualifying and then took the class win on both races.

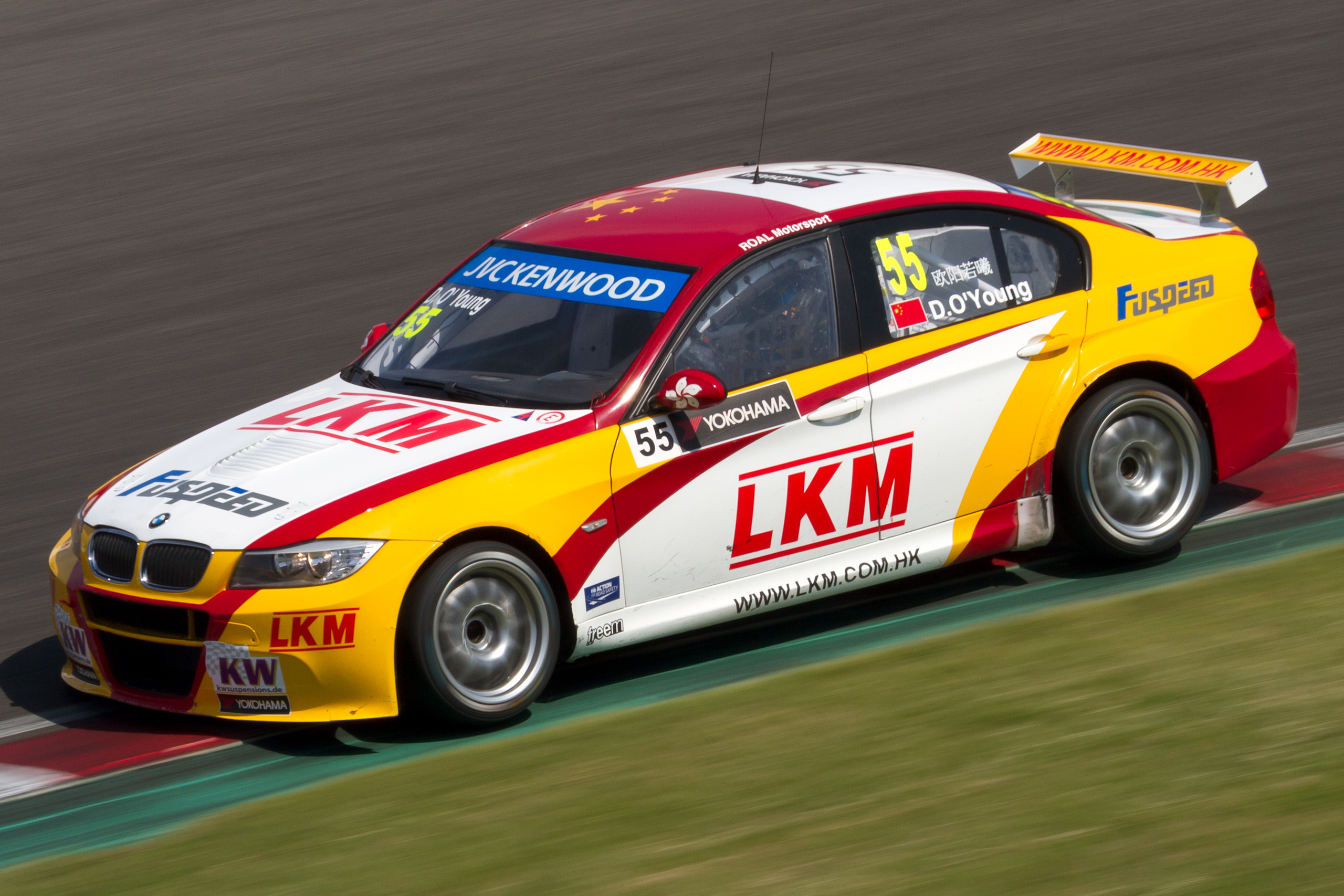
O'Young driving the ROAL Motorsport BMW 320TC at Suzuka during the 2013 World Touring Car Championship season.

==== ROAL Motorsport (2013) ====
O'Young joined ROAL Motorsport for 2013, partnering Tom Coronel in one of their BMW 320 TCs. He qualified tenth for the season opening Race of Italy which meant he started on pole position when the grid was reversed for race two. He didn't score from either race with a best result of twelfth in race two.

=== Intercontinental Le Mans Cup ===
O'Young also entered the 2010 1000 km of Zhuhai, a race of the Intercontinental Le Mans Cup. He teamed up with Prospeed Competition and Richard Westbrook for the race but the car stopped after 119 laps.

=== Deutsche Tourenwagen Masters ===
O'Young was drafted into Audi's line-up for the 2010 DTM season finale in Shanghai to replace Alexandre Premat, who was dismissed by the manufacturer.

=== Bathurst 12 Hour ===
O'Young has raced four times at the Bathurst 12 Hour. He drove two times 2011 and 2012 for the factory backed Audi team winning both times driving an Audi R8 LMS GT3. In 2015, he returned with Craft-Bamboo Racing in the Aston Martin V12 GT3 and finished third-place overall, second in class, driving with Alex MacDowall and Stefan Mücke.

=== Merdeka Millennium Endurance Race ===
O'Young claimed third place in the Merdeka Millennium Endurance Race at Sepang, Malaysia. Driving a Porsche 911 GT3R for LKM Racing, Darryl, team owner Alan Siu, and Japan's Keita Sawa completed 309 laps of the 12 hour event to finish in third place overall and first in the Pro-Am class.

== Managerial career ==
O'Young currently manages race drivers Bianca Bustamante, Hana Burton, Marta Garcia, and Korean drifter Miji Kang

== Racing record ==
=== Complete Porsche Supercup results ===
(key) (Races in bold indicate pole position) (Races in italics indicate fastest lap)

Year	Team	Car	1	2	3	4	5	6	7	8	9	10	11	12	DC	Points
2007	Schnabel Engineering Team Jebson	Porsche 997 GT3	BHR; 10	BHR; Ret	ESP; 20	MON; 15	FRA; 21†	GBR; 21	GER; 26	HUN; 15	TUR; 15	ITA; Ret	BEL; 17		22nd	14
2008	Schnabel Engineering	Porsche 997 GT3	BHR; Ret	BHR; 16	ESP; 18	TUR; 18	MON; 15	FRA	GBR; Ret	GER	HUN; 23	ESP; 17	BEL; 20	ITA; 17	28th	4

† — Did not finish the race, but was classified as he completed over 90% of the race distance.

=== 24 Hours of Le Mans results ===
Year	Team	Co-Drivers	Car	Class	Laps	Pos.	Class Pos.
2009	(China) Endurance Asia Team (France) Perspective Racing	(France) Philippe Hesnault (Bulgaria) Plamen Kralev	Porsche 997 GT3-RSR	GT2	186	NC	NC
2013	(Italy) AF Corse	(Italy) Piergiuseppe Perazzini (Italy) Lorenzo Casè	Ferrari 458 Italia GT2	LMGTE Am	305	26th	**2nd**

=== Complete World Touring Car Championship results ===
(key) (Races in bold indicate pole position) (Races in italics indicate fastest lap)

Year	Team	Car	1	2	3	4	5	6	7	8	9	10	11	12	13	14	15	16	17	18	19	20	21	22	23	24	DC	Points
2010	bamboo-engineering	Chevrolet Lacetti	BRA; 1; 15	BRA; 2; 16	MAR; 1; 17	MAR; 2; 13	ITA; 1 Ret	ITA; 2; 12	BEL; 1; 20	BEL; 2; 12	POR; 1; 10	POR; 2; 9	GBR; 1; 21	GBR; 2 Ret	CZE; 1; 17	**CZE**; **2**; 7	GER; 1 NC	GER; 2; 12	ESP; 1; 14	ESP; 2; 17	JPN; 1; 10	JPN; 2; 9	MAC; 1 Ret	MAC; 2 Ret			15th	15
2011	bamboo-engineering	Chevrolet Lacetti	BRA; 1 Ret	BRA; 2; 11																							14th	43
2011	bamboo-engineering	Chevrolet Cruze 1.6T			BEL; 1; 10	BEL; 2; 4	ITA; 1; 7	ITA; 2; 6	HUN; 1; 12	HUN; 2; 8	CZE; 1; 7	CZE; 2 Ret	POR; 1; 12	POR; 2; 9	GBR; 1; 11	GBR; 2; 8	GER; 1; 14	GER; 2; 11	ESP; 1; 15	ESP; 2; 14	JPN; 1; 11	**JPN**; **2** Ret	CHN; 1; 13	CHN; 2 Ret	MAC; 1 Ret	MAC; 2; 12	14th	43
2012	Special Tuning Racing	SEAT León WTCC	ITA; 1 DNS	ITA; 2 DNS	ESP; 1; 10	ESP; 2 Ret	MAR; 1; 10	MAR; 2; 10	SVK; 1; 7	SVK; 2; 9	HUN; 1 NC	HUN; 2; 13	AUT; 1 Ret	AUT; 2 DNS	POR; 1; 13	POR; 2; 13	BRA; 1; 7	BRA; 2 Ret	USA; 1; 14	USA; 2; 12							14th	37
2012	bamboo-engineering	Chevrolet Cruze 1.6T																			JPN; 1; 11	JPN; 2; 13	CHN; 1 Ret	CHN; 2; 12	MAC; 1; 5	MAC; 2; 5	14th	37
2013	ROAL Motorsport	BMW 320 TC	ITA; 1; 13	**ITA**; **2**; 12	MAR; 1; 12	MAR; 2; 9	SVK; 1; 14	SVK; 2; 10	HUN; 1 NC	HUN; 2; 10	AUT; 1; 20†	AUT; 2 DNS	RUS; 1; 20	RUS; 2; 9	POR; 1; 12	POR; 2; 13	ARG; 1; 15	ARG; 2; 18	USA; 1 Ret	USA; 2; 12	JPN; 1; 13	JPN; 2; 10	CHN; 1; 20	CHN; 2; 30†	MAC; 1; 13	MAC; 2 Ret	19th	7

=== Complete Deutsche Tourenwagen Masters results ===
(key) (Races in bold indicate pole position) (Races in italics indicate fastest lap)

Year	Team	Car	1	2	3	4	5	6	7	8	9	10	11	Pos	Points
2010	Team Phoenix	Audi A4 DTM 2008	HOC	VAL	LAU	NOR	NÜR	ZAN	BRH	OSC	HOC	ADR	SHA; DNS	NC	0

=== Complete GT1 World Championship results ===
Year	Team	Car	1	2	3	4	5	6	7	8	9	10	11	12	13	14	15	16	17	18	Pos	Points
2012	Reiter Engineering	Lamborghini	NOG; QR; 8	NOG; CR; 7	ZOL; QR; 8	ZOL; CR; 13	NAV; QR; 4	NAV; QR; 7	SVK; QR; 13	SVK; CR; 11	ALG; QR; Ret	ALG; CR; 4	SVK; QR; 6	SVK; CR; 7	MOS; QR	MOS; CR	NÜR; QR	NÜR; CR	DON; QR	DON; CR	17th	34

=== Complete FIA World Endurance Championship results ===
(key) (Races in bold indicate pole position; races in italics indicate fastest lap)

Year	Entrant	Class	Car	Engine	1	2	3	4	5	6	7	8	Rank	Points
2013	AF Corse	LMGTE Am	Ferrari 458 Italia GT2	Ferrari F136 4.5 L V8	SIL	SPA	LMS; 2	SÃO	COA	FUJ	SHA	BHR	**8th**	**36**
2014	Aston Martin Racing	LMGTE Pro	Aston Martin Vantage GTE	Aston Martin AM05 4.5 L V8	SIL; 7	SPA; 5	LMS; WD	COA; 10	**FUJ**; 3	SHA; 4	BHR	SÃO; 5	**13th**	**55**

Sporting positions
Preceded by Jonathan Cocker	Porsche Carrera Cup Asia; Champion; 2006	Succeeded by Tim Sugden
Preceded by Tim Sugden	Porsche Carrera Cup Asia; Champion; 2008	Succeeded by Christian Menzel
Preceded by Inaugural	Macau GT Cup; Winner; 2008	Succeeded by Keita Sawa
Preceded by John Bowe; Garry Holt; Paul Morris	Bathurst 12 Hour; Winner; 2011 & 2012; With: Christopher Mies, Marc Basseng (2011) & Christer Jöns (2012)	Succeeded by Thomas Jäger; Alexander Roloff; Bernd Schneider
Preceded by Ye Hongli	Macau GT Cup; Winner; 2021	Succeeded by Maro Engel
Preceded by Liang Jiatong (GT4)	Greater Bay Area GT Cup; GT3 Winner; 2023	Succeeded by Han Lichao (GT4)
