= 2012 Bathurst 12 Hour =

Endurance motor racing event

2012 Armor All Bathurst 12 Hour

Seasons
- ← 2011 2013 →

Layout of the Mount Panorama Circuit

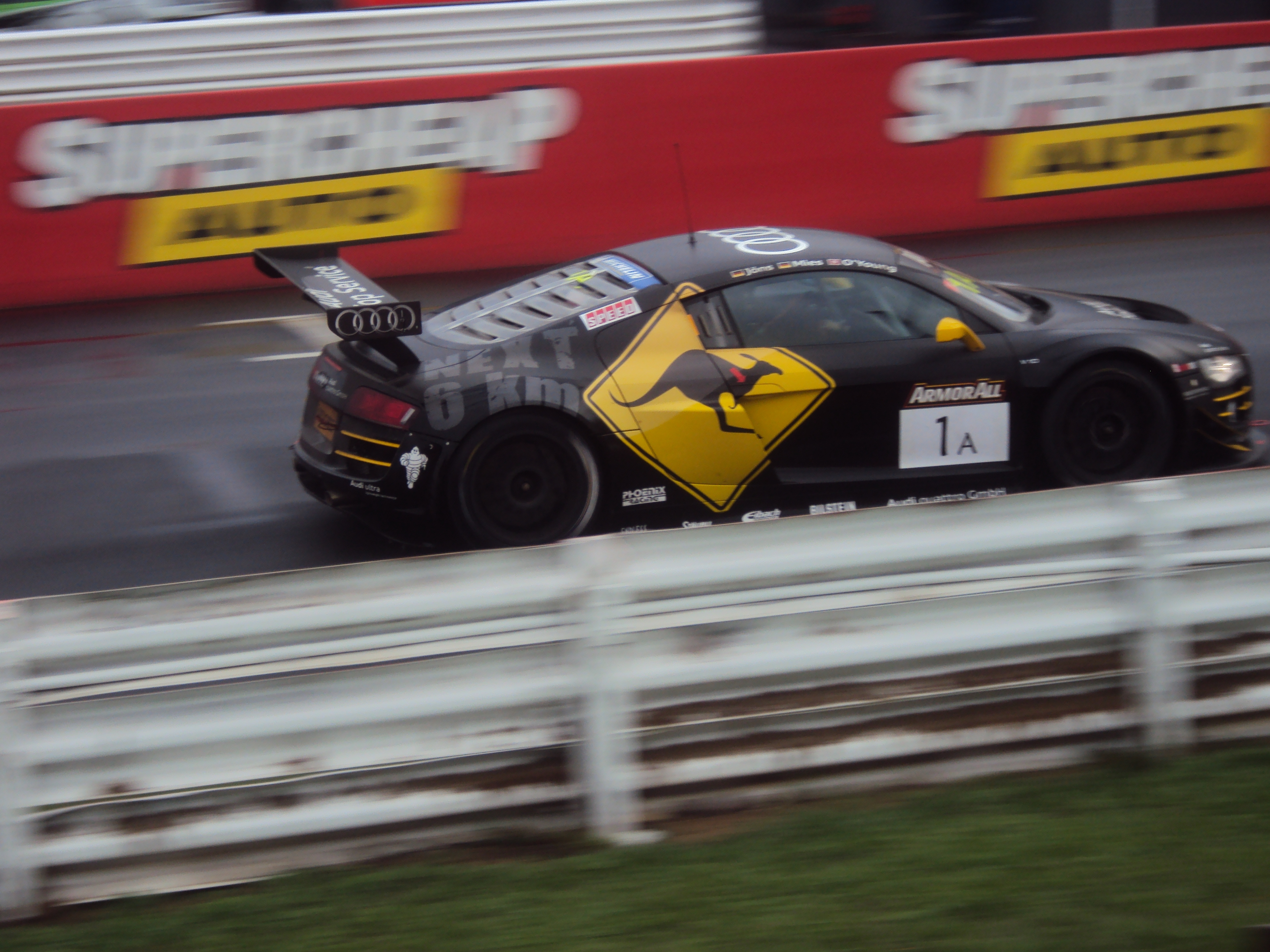
The race and Class A-winning Audi R8 GT3 LMS of Christer Jöns, Christopher Mies and Darryl O'Young.

The 2012 Armor All Bathurst 12 Hour was an endurance race for GT3 cars, GT4 cars, Group 3E Series Production Cars and Dubai 24 Hour cars. The event, which was staged at the Mount Panorama Circuit, near Bathurst, in New South Wales, Australia on 26 February 2012, was the tenth running of the Bathurst 12 Hour, and the sixth since the race was revived in 2007.

There were 25 starters in the race, the smallest field since the inaugural Bathurst 12 Hour event in 1991. Four of the six classes, B, C, E and I, each had only three starters.

The race was won by 2011 Armour All Bathurst 12 Hour winners Darryl O'Young of Hong Kong and Christopher Mies of Germany with their new co-driver for 2012, German Christer Jöns. The trio drove a Phoenix Racing prepared Audi R8 LMS GT3, the same model that Mies and O'Young had driven to victory in 2011.

== Class structure ==
Cars competed in the following six classes.

- Class A – GT3 Outright
- Class B – GT3
- Class C – GT4
- Class D – Production (High Performance)
- Class E – Production (Performance)
- Class I – Invitational

Classes D & E were open to Group 3E Series Production Cars and Class I was for cars complying with the regulations for the 2012 Dubai 24 Hour race.

== Qualifying ==
Two qualifying sessions were run on Saturday 25 February with New Zealand driver Craig Baird setting the fastest time of 2:07.56 in the Clearwater Racing entered Ferrari 458 GT3 and Allan Simonsen next in the Maranello Motorsports Ferrari 458 GT3. However, as grid positions were determined by aggregating the lap times of all drivers in each three-driver entry and the three slowest drivers in each four-driver car, pole position was awarded to the Phoenix Racing entered Audi R8 LMS GT3 of Christer Jöns, Christopher Mies and Darryl O'Young. Simonsen's Ferrari started second on the grid ahead of the Clearwater Racing Ferrari and the Lago Racing Lamborghini Gallardo LP600 of Roger Lago, David Russell and Wayne Park. The Hunter Sports Group Porsche 997 GT3 Cup was the first of the Class B cars in eighth grid position.

The Clearwater Racing Ferrari was forced to carry addition weight during the race as, in a form of parity equalisation, any car undercutting a 2:08 lap time in any pre-race session was levied with a 50 kg penalty.

Two cars were withdrawn before the race. The Consolidated Chemicals Lamborghini Gallardo LP560 was crashed by Ted Huglin during Qualifying and could not be repaired in time for the race and the Mark Bell Racing Ford BF Falcon XR8 did not start after only one of its three drivers had lapped during Practice or Qualifying within the mandatory 130% of the fastest time set during Qualifying.

== Race ==
The Phoenix Racing Audi won by 1 minute and 13 seconds over the Mercedes-Benz SLS AMG jointly run by international team Black Falcon and Australian team Erebus Racing. The Mercedes was driven by Dutch driver Jeroen Bleekemolen, American Bret Curtis and Australians Peter Hackett and Tim Slade. The two leading cars finished two laps ahead of the third placed car, the Clearwater Racing Ferrari 458 GT3 driven by New Zealand driver Craig Baird, Irish driver Matt Griffin and Singaporean driver Weng Sun Mok.

The race was affected by inclement weather, with rain falling for over eight of the races twelve hours, exacting a high price amongst the fastest cars in the race. Of the Class A starters, only the three podium placed cars finished, with crashes eliminating the other two Audis, a second Mercedes and a Lamborghini. The only other car in the class was the Maranello Motorsport Ferrari 458 GT3 which retired early with mechanical problems, but not before the car's lead driver, Dane Allan Simonsen, established a new outright lap record for the Mount Panorama circuit, the first time the record had been held by a GT car.

In fourth place outright, 14 laps behind the Clearwater Ferrari, was the first of the Class B cars, the Porsche 997 GT3 Cup fielded by the Tinkler Motorsports team owned by former mining magnate Nathan Tinkler. Tinkler himself was one of the drivers, joined by professional V8 Supercar drivers Steven Johnson and Steven Richards. They won Class B by ten laps over the similar Porsche of New Zealand team Motorsport Services Limited, driven by Simon McLennan, Brett Niall and Scott O'Donnell.

Class C was won by the Donut King Racing Nissan R35 GT-R driven by Tony Alford, Peter Leemhuis and Adam Beechey. The Nissan finished ten laps ahead of the Lotus Exige of Rob Thomson, Sarah Harley and Austrian driver Christian Klien.

Class D was won by the HSV GTS of James Atkinson, Dean Lillie and Rick Newman. It inherited the class lead after the Maximum Motorsport Subaru Impreza WRX STi of Dean Herridge, John O'Dowd and Angus Kennard suffered a turbocharger failure. The damage was repaired and the Subaru still finished second in class, 11 laps down.

Class E saw the HSV VXR Turbo of Elliot Barbour, Scott Pye, New Zealand V8 Utes racer Chris Pither finishing first in class and seventh outright. The HSV finished 13 laps ahead of the second placed GWS Personnel Motorsport BMW 130i driven by Angus Chapel, Richard Gartner and Tony Prior, and nine laps ahead of the first Class D car.

Class I saw only two classified finishers with the Dutch SEAT León TDI of Ivo Breukers, Henk Thijssen and Australian driver Martin Bailey winning the class and finishing in sixteenth position outright, over 100 laps behind the winning Audi. A pair of Mazda RX-7s completed the class with one retiring after 53 laps and the other still running at the finish but having completed only 82 laps.

== Official results ==
Pos	Class	No	Team / Entrant	Drivers	Car	Laps	Time/Retired
Pos	Class	No	Team / Entrant	Drivers	Engine	Laps	Time/Retired
1	**A**	**1**	**(Germany) Phoenix Racing**	**(Germany) Christer Jöns (Germany) Christopher Mies (Hong Kong) Darryl O'Young**	**Audi R8 LMS GT3**	**270**	**12:03:31.3753**
1	**A**	**1**	**(Germany) Phoenix Racing**	**(Germany) Christer Jöns (Germany) Christopher Mies (Hong Kong) Darryl O'Young**	**5.2 L FSI 2×DOHC Audi V10**	**270**	**12:03:31.3753**
2	A	20	(Australia) Erebus Racing	(Netherlands) Jeroen Bleekemolen (United States) Bret Curtis (Australia) Peter Hackett (Australia) Tim Slade	Mercedes-Benz SLS AMG	270	+13.2838
2	A	20	(Australia) Erebus Racing	(Netherlands) Jeroen Bleekemolen (United States) Bret Curtis (Australia) Peter Hackett (Australia) Tim Slade	6.2 L Mercedes-Benz M159 V8	270	+13.2838
3	A	33	(Singapore) Clearwater Racing	(New Zealand) Craig Baird (Republic of Ireland) Matt Griffin (Singapore) Weng Sun Mok	Ferrari 458 GT3	268	+2 laps
3	A	33	(Singapore) Clearwater Racing	(New Zealand) Craig Baird (Republic of Ireland) Matt Griffin (Singapore) Weng Sun Mok	4.5 L Ferrari F142 V8	268	+2 laps
4	**B**	**3**	**(Australia) Hunter Sports Group**	**(Australia) Steven Johnson (New Zealand) Steven Richards (Australia) Nathan Tinkler**	**Porsche 997 GT3 Cup**	**254**	**+16 laps**
4	**B**	**3**	**(Australia) Hunter Sports Group**	**(Australia) Steven Johnson (New Zealand) Steven Richards (Australia) Nathan Tinkler**	**3.8 L Porsche H6**	**254**	**+16 laps**
5	B	65	(New Zealand) Motorsport Services Limited	(New Zealand) Simon McLennan (Australia) Brett Niall (New Zealand) Scott O'Donnell	Porsche 997 GT3 Cup	244	+26 laps
5	B	65	(New Zealand) Motorsport Services Limited	(New Zealand) Simon McLennan (Australia) Brett Niall (New Zealand) Scott O'Donnell	3.8 L Porsche H6	244	+26 laps
6	**C**	**54**	**(Australia) Donut King Racing**	**(Australia) Tony Alford (Australia) Adam Beechey (Australia) Peter Leemhuis**	**Nissan R35 GT-R**	**237**	**+33 laps**
6	**C**	**54**	**(Australia) Donut King Racing**	**(Australia) Tony Alford (Australia) Adam Beechey (Australia) Peter Leemhuis**	**3.8 L Twin-turbo VR38DETT V6**	**237**	**+33 laps**
7	**E**	**50**	**(Australia) Racer Industries**	**(Australia) Elliott Barbour (New Zealand) Chris Pither (Australia) Scott Pye**	**HSV VXR Turbo**	**231**	**+39 laps**
7	**E**	**50**	**(Australia) Racer Industries**	**(Australia) Elliott Barbour (New Zealand) Chris Pither (Australia) Scott Pye**	**2.2 L Ecotec I4**	**231**	**+39 laps**
8	B	66	(New Zealand) Motorsport Services Limited	(New Zealand) Allan Dippie (New Zealand) Mark Maddren (New Zealand) Bruce Tomlinson	Porsche 996 GT3 Cup	228	+42 laps
8	B	66	(New Zealand) Motorsport Services Limited	(New Zealand) Allan Dippie (New Zealand) Mark Maddren (New Zealand) Bruce Tomlinson	3.8 L Porsche H6	228	+42 laps
9	C	62	(Australia) Rob Thomson Racing	(Australia) Sarah Harley (Austria) Christian Klien (Australia) Rob Thomson	Lotus Exige S	227	+43 laps
9	C	62	(Australia) Rob Thomson Racing	(Australia) Sarah Harley (Austria) Christian Klien (Australia) Rob Thomson	1.8 L Supercharged Toyota I4	227	+43 laps
10	**D**	**53**	**(Australia) James Atkinson Racing**	**(Australia) James Atkinson (Australia) Dean Lillie (Australia) Rick Newman**	**HSV GTS**	**222**	**+48 laps**
10	**D**	**53**	**(Australia) James Atkinson Racing**	**(Australia) James Atkinson (Australia) Dean Lillie (Australia) Rick Newman**	**6.2 L LS3 V8**	**222**	**+48 laps**
11	E	26	(Australia) GWS Personnel Motorsport	(Australia) Angus Chapel (Australia) Richard Gartner (Australia) Tony Prior	BMW 130i	218	+52 laps
11	E	26	(Australia) GWS Personnel Motorsport	(Australia) Angus Chapel (Australia) Richard Gartner (Australia) Tony Prior	3.0 L BMW N52 I6	218	+52 laps
12	D	7	(Australia) Maximum Motorsport	(Australia) Dean Herridge (Australia) Angus Kennard (Australia) John O'Dowd	Subaru Impreza WRX STi	211	+59 laps
12	D	7	(Australia) Maximum Motorsport	(Australia) Dean Herridge (Australia) Angus Kennard (Australia) John O'Dowd	2.5 L Subaru H4	211	+59 laps
13	D	28	(Australia) GWS Personnel Motorsport	(Australia) Christian D'Agostin (Australia) Garth Duffy (Australia) Peter O'Donnell	BMW 335i	205	+65 laps
13	D	28	(Australia) GWS Personnel Motorsport	(Australia) Christian D'Agostin (Australia) Garth Duffy (Australia) Peter O'Donnell	3.0 L BMW N54 Twin-turbo I6	205	+65 laps
14	E	27	(Australia) GWS Personnel Motorsport	(Australia) Kean Booker (Australia) Carl Oberhauser (Australia) Allan Shephard	BMW 130i	200	+70 laps
14	E	27	(Australia) GWS Personnel Motorsport	(Australia) Kean Booker (Australia) Carl Oberhauser (Australia) Allan Shephard	3.0 L BMW N52 I6	200	+70 laps
15	D	67	(New Zealand) Motorsport Services Limited	(New Zealand) John de Veth (Australia) Tony Head (New Zealand) Todd Murphy (New Zealand) Lewis Scott	BMW 135i	198	+72 laps
15	D	67	(New Zealand) Motorsport Services Limited	(New Zealand) John de Veth (Australia) Tony Head (New Zealand) Todd Murphy (New Zealand) Lewis Scott	3.0 L BMW N55 Twin-turbo I6	198	+72 laps
16	**I**	**14**	**(Netherlands) Red Camels Jordans**	**(Australia) Martin Bailey (Netherlands) Ivo Breukers (Netherlands) Henk Thijssen**	**SEAT León TDI**	**166**	**+104 laps**
16	**I**	**14**	**(Netherlands) Red Camels Jordans**	**(Australia) Martin Bailey (Netherlands) Ivo Breukers (Netherlands) Henk Thijssen**	**2.0 L SEAT Turbodiesel I4**	**166**	**+104 laps**
17	D	68	(New Zealand) Motorsport Services Limited	(New Zealand) David Glasson (New Zealand) Aaron Harris (New Zealand) Dennis Roderick	BMW 135i	162	+108 laps
17	D	68	(New Zealand) Motorsport Services Limited	(New Zealand) David Glasson (New Zealand) Aaron Harris (New Zealand) Dennis Roderick	3.0 L BMW N55 Twin-turbo I6	162	+108 laps
18	I	32	(Australia) Massel Racing	(Australia) Michael Caine (Australia) Gerry Murphy (Australia) Jim Pollicina	Mazda RX-7	82	+188 laps
18	I	32	(Australia) Massel Racing	(Australia) Michael Caine (Australia) Gerry Murphy (Australia) Jim Pollicina	1.3 L Mazda 13B-REW Twin-turbo Two-Rotor	82	+188 laps
DNF	A	2	(Germany) Phoenix Racing	(Australia) Mark Eddy (Australia) Craig Lowndes (Australia) Warren Luff	Audi R8 LMS GT3	156	Crash
DNF	A	2	(Germany) Phoenix Racing	(Australia) Mark Eddy (Australia) Craig Lowndes (Australia) Warren Luff	5.2 L FSI 2×DOHC Audi V10	156	Crash
DNF	A	17	(Australia) Maranello Motorsport	(Australia) John Bowe (Australia) Peter Edwards (Germany) Dominik Farnbacher (Denmark) Allan Simonsen	Ferrari 458 GT3	114	Electrical issues
DNF	A	17	(Australia) Maranello Motorsport	(Australia) John Bowe (Australia) Peter Edwards (Germany) Dominik Farnbacher (Denmark) Allan Simonsen	4.5 L Ferrari F142 V8	114	Electrical issues
DNF	A	23	(Australia) Lago Racing	(Australia) Roger Lago (Australia) Wayne Park (Australia) David Russell	Lamborghini Gallardo LP600	103	Crash
DNF	A	23	(Australia) Lago Racing	(Australia) Roger Lago (Australia) Wayne Park (Australia) David Russell	5.2 L Lamborghini V10	103	Crash
DNF	C	10	(Australia) Simply Sports Cars	(Australia) Adam Gowans (United Kingdom) Chris Lillingston-Price (United Kingdom) Richard Meins	Lotus Exige S	69	Engine
DNF	C	10	(Australia) Simply Sports Cars	(Australia) Adam Gowans (United Kingdom) Chris Lillingston-Price (United Kingdom) Richard Meins	1.8 L Supercharged Toyota I4	69	Engine
DNF	A	22	(United States) United Autosports	(France) Alain Li (United States) Mark Patterson (Hong Kong) Frank Yu Siu Fung	Audi R8 LMS GT3	59	Crash
DNF	A	22	(United States) United Autosports	(France) Alain Li (United States) Mark Patterson (Hong Kong) Frank Yu Siu Fung	5.2 L Audi V10	59	Crash
DNF	I	35	(Australia) Ric Shaw Racing	(Australia) Phil Alexander (Australia) Andrew Bollom (Australia) Duvashen Padayachee (Australia) James Parish	Mazda RX-7	53	Crash
DNF	I	35	(Australia) Ric Shaw Racing	(Australia) Phil Alexander (Australia) Andrew Bollom (Australia) Duvashen Padayachee (Australia) James Parish	1.3 L Mazda 13B-REW Twin-turbo Two-Rotor	53	Crash
DNF	A	21	(Germany) Black Falcon	(Republic of Ireland) Sean Patrick Breslin (Republic of Ireland) Sean Paul Breslin (Tanzania) Vimal Mehta (New Zealand) Rob Wilson	Mercedes-Benz SLS AMG	52	Crash
DNF	A	21	(Germany) Black Falcon	(Republic of Ireland) Sean Patrick Breslin (Republic of Ireland) Sean Paul Breslin (Tanzania) Vimal Mehta (New Zealand) Rob Wilson	6.2 L Mercedes-Benz M159 V8	52	Crash
DNS	A	4	(Australia) Consolidated Chemicals Racing	(Australia) Ted Huglin (Netherlands) Peter Kox (Australia) Cameron McConville (Australia) Luke Searle	Lamborghini Gallardo LP560	0	Crash in Qualifying
DNS	A	4	(Australia) Consolidated Chemicals Racing	(Australia) Ted Huglin (Netherlands) Peter Kox (Australia) Cameron McConville (Australia) Luke Searle	5.2 L Lamborghini V10	0	Crash in Qualifying
DNQ	E	91	(Australia) Mark Bell Racing	(Australia) Mark Bell (Australia) Adam Dodd (Australia) Aaron Zerefos	Ford BF Falcon XR8	0	Did not qualify
DNQ	E	91	(Australia) Mark Bell Racing	(Australia) Mark Bell (Australia) Adam Dodd (Australia) Aaron Zerefos	5.4 L Boss 315 V8	0	Did not qualify

- Note: Class winners are shown in Bold
- Race time of winning car: 12:03:31.3753
- Fastest race lap: 2:06.3311 – Car 17 – New outright lap record
