= 2011 Bathurst 12 Hour =

Endurance car race in Australia

2011 Armor All Bathurst 12 Hour

Seasons
- ← 2010 2012 →

Layout of the Mount Panorama Circuit

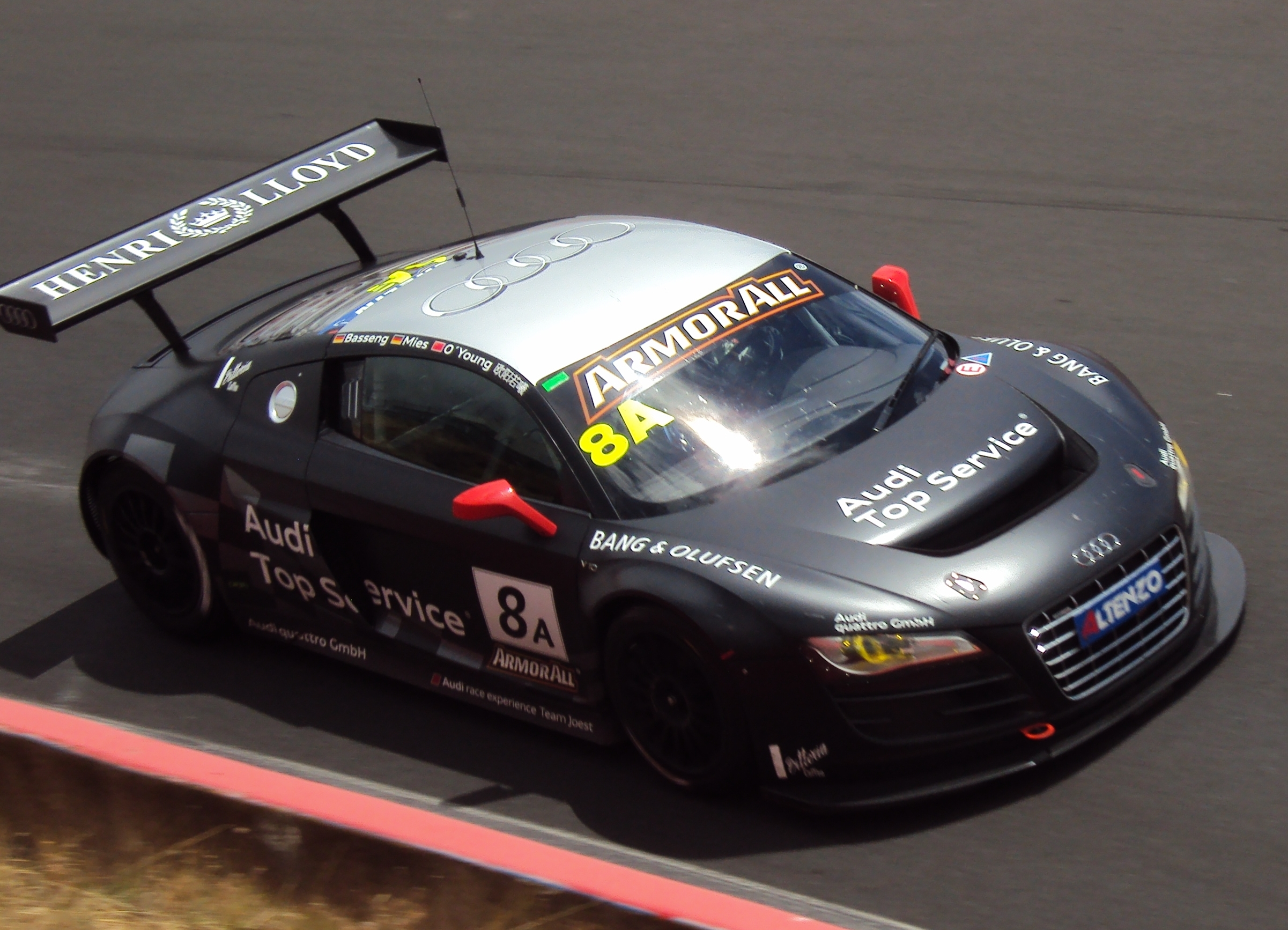
The race and Class A-winning Audi R8 GT3 LMS of Darryl O'Young, Marc Basseng and Christopher Mies

The 2011 Armor All Bathurst 12 Hour was an endurance race for FIA GT3 cars, Australian GT Championship cars, Group 3E Series Production Cars and other invited vehicles. The event, which was staged at the Mount Panorama Circuit, Bathurst, New South Wales, Australia, on 6 February 2011, was the ninth running of the Bathurst 12 Hour, and the fifth since the race was revived in 2007.

The race saw GT cars return to long distance racing at Mount Panorama for the first time since the 2003 Bathurst 24 Hour. The addition of the faster GT3 entries saw the leading cars break the previous distance record by 29 laps. It also saw many potential Class D and E entries not compete due to being reduced from outright contenders in previous races to class contenders for 2011. One of the reason's for including the GT cars was an attempt to not only increase manufacturer involvement in the race but to also raise the international profile of the event and attract the top FIA GT3 teams.

The race was won by Audi's official factory supported team Audi Sport which was run by Audi's Le Mans 24 Hour team, Joest Racing, under the banners of "Audi Australia" for car #7 and "Audi Top Service" for car #8. Running a pair of Audi R8 LMS GT3s, the team of Marc Basseng, Christopher Mies and Darryl O'Young (#8) lead home teammates Mark Eddy, Craig Lowndes and Warren Luff (#7) in a 1-2 finish, the cars crossing the line only 0.7141 seconds apart in a true racing finish. Lowndes fastest race lap of 2:09.0861 also set a new GT lap record for Mt Panorama, cutting a second from the time of 2:10.0277 set 16 months earlier by Tony Quinn driving an Aston Martin DBRS9. Lowndes time came within 0.6210 of his Triple Eight Race Engineering teammate Jamie Whincup's outright lap record of 2:08.4651 set in a Ford BF Falcon V8 Supercar in 2007. The Joest Racing R8's finished one lap in front of the VIP Pet Foods Racing Porsche 997 GT3 Cup R of Craig Baird and father and son pairing Tony and Klark Quinn.

The race was run under international endurance rules meaning that all cars compulsory pit stops were each to be no less than 90 seconds in duration. The Class A cars had to make 12 compulsory stops with no less than 10 laps between each stop while Class B cars only had to make 9 compulsory stops.

== Class structure ==
Cars competed in the following classes:

- Class A – GT3 Outright
- Class B – GT3
- Class C – GT4
- Class D – High Performance
- Class E – Production Performance

== Official results ==
Those in Bold represent class winners. Fastest Laps in Italics represent the class fastest lap.

Pos	Class	No	Team / Entrant	Drivers	Car	Laps	Time/Retired
Pos	Class	No	Team / Entrant	Drivers	Engine	Laps	Time/Retired
1	**A**	**8**	**(Germany) Audi Race Experience Team Joest**	**(Hong Kong) Darryl O'Young (Germany) Marc Basseng (Germany) Christopher Mies**	**Audi R8 LMS GT3**	**292**	**12:01:30.7045**
1	**A**	**8**	**(Germany) Audi Race Experience Team Joest**	**(Hong Kong) Darryl O'Young (Germany) Marc Basseng (Germany) Christopher Mies**	**5.2 L FSI 2×DOHC V10**	**292**	**12:01:30.7045**
2	A	7	(Germany) Audi Race Experience Team Joest	(Australia) Mark Eddy (Australia) Craig Lowndes (Australia) Warren Luff	Audi R8 LMS GT3	292	+0.7141
2	A	7	(Germany) Audi Race Experience Team Joest	(Australia) Mark Eddy (Australia) Craig Lowndes (Australia) Warren Luff	5.2 L FSI 2×DOHC V10	292	+0.7141
3	A	29	(Australia) VIP Holdings (Aust) Pty Ltd	(United Kingdom) Tony Quinn (Australia) Klark Quinn (New Zealand) Craig Baird	Porsche 997 GT3 Cup R	291	+1 Lap
3	A	29	(Australia) VIP Holdings (Aust) Pty Ltd	(United Kingdom) Tony Quinn (Australia) Klark Quinn (New Zealand) Craig Baird	4.0 L Porsche H6	291	+1 Lap
4	A	38	(Australia) Wall Racing	(Australia) David Wall (Australia) Greg Crick (Australia) Barton Mawer	Porsche 997 GT3 Cup S	289	+3 laps
4	A	38	(Australia) Wall Racing	(Australia) David Wall (Australia) Greg Crick (Australia) Barton Mawer	3.8 L Porsche H6	289	+3 laps
5	**B**	**23**	**(Australia) Lago Racing**	**(Australia) Roger Lago (Australia) Matt Kingsley (Australia) David Russell**	**Porsche 997 GT3 Cup**	**282**	**+10 laps**
5	**B**	**23**	**(Australia) Lago Racing**	**(Australia) Roger Lago (Australia) Matt Kingsley (Australia) David Russell**	3.8 L Porsche H6	**282**	**+10 laps**
6	A	37	(United Kingdom) Rosso Verde Ireland	(United Kingdom) Hector Lester (Australia) Luke Searle (Denmark) Allan Simonsen	Ferrari 430 GT3	276	+16 laps
6	A	37	(United Kingdom) Rosso Verde Ireland	(United Kingdom) Hector Lester (Australia) Luke Searle (Denmark) Allan Simonsen	4.3 L Ferrari V8	276	+16 laps
7	B	66	(New Zealand) Motorsport Services	(New Zealand) Scott O'Donnell (New Zealand) Simon McLennan (Slovakia) Miroslav Konôpka	Porsche 996 GT3 Cup	264	+28 laps
7	B	66	(New Zealand) Motorsport Services	(New Zealand) Scott O'Donnell (New Zealand) Simon McLennan (Slovakia) Miroslav Konôpka	3.8 L Porsche H6	264	+28 laps
8	B	67	(New Zealand) Motorsport Services	(New Zealand) Allan Dippie (New Zealand) Steven Thompson (New Zealand) Mark Maddren	Porsche 996 GT3 Cup	257	+35 laps
8	B	67	(New Zealand) Motorsport Services	(New Zealand) Allan Dippie (New Zealand) Steven Thompson (New Zealand) Mark Maddren	3.8 L Porsche H6	257	+35 laps
9	**D**	**14**	**(Australia) Peter Conroy Motorsport**	**(Australia) Peter Conroy (Australia) Anthony Robson (Australia) Mark Brame**	**Mitsubishi Lancer RS Evo X**	**256**	**+36 laps**
9	**D**	**14**	**(Australia) Peter Conroy Motorsport**	**(Australia) Peter Conroy (Australia) Anthony Robson (Australia) Mark Brame**	2.0 L 4B11T I4	**256**	**+36 laps**
10	D	28	(Australia) GWS Personnel Motorsport	(Australia) Peter O'Donnell (Australia) Matthew Hansen (Australia) Christian D'Agostin	BMW 335i	252	+40 laps
10	D	28	(Australia) GWS Personnel Motorsport	(Australia) Peter O'Donnell (Australia) Matthew Hansen (Australia) Christian D'Agostin	3.0 L twin-turbo I6 N54	252	+40 laps
11	**E**	**26**	**(Australia) GWS Personnel Motorsport**	**(Australia) Bruce Tomlinson (Australia) Geoff Fontaine (Australia) Richard Gartner**	**BMW 130i**	**244**	**+48 laps**
11	**E**	**26**	**(Australia) GWS Personnel Motorsport**	**(Australia) Bruce Tomlinson (Australia) Geoff Fontaine (Australia) Richard Gartner**	3.0 L BMW N55 I6	**244**	**+48 laps**
12	**C**	**80**	**(Australia) Bruce Lynton BMW**	**(Australia) Beric Lynton (Australia) Matt Mackelden (Australia) John Modystach**	**BMW M3**	**242 ***	**+50 laps**
12	**C**	**80**	**(Australia) Bruce Lynton BMW**	**(Australia) Beric Lynton (Australia) Matt Mackelden (Australia) John Modystach**	3.2 L BMW S54 I6	**242 ***	**+50 laps**
13	D	5	(Australia) Tinkler Motor Sports	(Australia) Nathan Tinkler (Australia) Jeremy Gray (Australia) Steven Johnson	FPV FG GT	238	+54 laps
13	D	5	(Australia) Tinkler Motor Sports	(Australia) Nathan Tinkler (Australia) Jeremy Gray (Australia) Steven Johnson	5.4 L Boss 315 V8	238	+54 laps
14	E	68	(New Zealand) Motorsport Services	(New Zealand) David Glasson (New Zealand) Dennis Roderick (New Zealand) Aaron Harris	BMW 130i	235	+57 laps
14	E	68	(New Zealand) Motorsport Services	(New Zealand) David Glasson (New Zealand) Dennis Roderick (New Zealand) Aaron Harris	3.0 L BMW N55 I6	235	+57 laps
15	B	39	(Australia) Wall Racing	(Australia) Paul Tresidder (Australia) Shane Smollen (Australia) Simon Middleton	Porsche 997 GT3 Cup	230	+62 laps
15	B	39	(Australia) Wall Racing	(Australia) Paul Tresidder (Australia) Shane Smollen (Australia) Simon Middleton	3.8 L Porsche H6	230	+62 laps
16	E	50	(Australia) Racer Industries	(Australia) Chaz Mostert (Australia) Ashley Walsh (Australia) Gerard McLeod	HSV VXR Turbo	227	+65 laps
16	E	50	(Australia) Racer Industries	(Australia) Chaz Mostert (Australia) Ashley Walsh (Australia) Gerard McLeod	2.2 L Ecotec I4	227	+65 laps
17	C	25	(Australia) Paul Freestone Racing	(Australia) Paul Freestone (Australia) Hayden Pullen (Australia) David Sieders	Chevrolet Corvette Z06	192	+100 laps
17	C	25	(Australia) Paul Freestone Racing	(Australia) Paul Freestone (Australia) Hayden Pullen (Australia) David Sieders	7.0 L LS7 V8	192	+100 laps
18	C	62	(Australia) Lee Knappett Racing	(Australia) Adam Gowans (United Kingdom) Richard Meins (United Kingdom) Chris Lillingston-Price	Lotus Exige S	192	+100 laps
18	C	62	(Australia) Lee Knappett Racing	(Australia) Adam Gowans (United Kingdom) Richard Meins (United Kingdom) Chris Lillingston-Price	1.8 L supercharged Toyota I4	192	+100 laps
19	D	3	(Australia) Maximum Motorsport	(Australia) Dean Herridge (Australia) John O'Dowd (Australia) Angus Kennard	Subaru Impreza WRX STi	129	+163 laps
19	D	3	(Australia) Maximum Motorsport	(Australia) Dean Herridge (Australia) John O'Dowd (Australia) Angus Kennard	2.5 L Subaru H4	129	+163 laps
DNF	A	69	(Australia) Supabarn Supermarkets Racing	(Australia) James Koundouris (Australia) Theo Koundouris (Australia) Steve Owen	Porsche 997 GT3 Cup S	261	Driveline
DNF	A	69	(Australia) Supabarn Supermarkets Racing	(Australia) James Koundouris (Australia) Theo Koundouris (Australia) Steve Owen	3.8 L Porsche H6	261	Driveline
DNF	A	12	(Australia) Hallmarc Racing	(Australia) Marc Cini (Australia) David Reynolds (Australia) Dean Fiore	Porsche 997 GT3 Cup S	196	Accident
DNF	A	12	(Australia) Hallmarc Racing	(Australia) Marc Cini (Australia) David Reynolds (Australia) Dean Fiore	3.8 L Porsche H6	196	Accident
DNF	D	43	(Australia) Alan East Motorsport	(Australia) Leigh Burges (Australia) Damien Flack (Australia) Neil McFadyen	Mitsubishi Lancer GSR Evo IX	165	Turbo
DNF	D	43	(Australia) Alan East Motorsport	(Australia) Leigh Burges (Australia) Damien Flack (Australia) Neil McFadyen	2.0 L 4G63T I4	165	Turbo
DNF	A	17	(Australia) Maranello Motorsport	(Australia) Peter Edwards (Australia) John Bowe (Australia) Tim Leahey	Ferrari 430 GT3	161	Engine
DNF	A	17	(Australia) Maranello Motorsport	(Australia) Peter Edwards (Australia) John Bowe (Australia) Tim Leahey	4.3 L Ferrari V8	161	Engine
DNF	E	27	(Australia) GWS Personnel Motorsport	(Australia) Garth Duffy (Australia) Alan Shepherd (Australia) Paul Stubber	BMW 130i	106	Spun off
DNF	E	27	(Australia) GWS Personnel Motorsport	(Australia) Garth Duffy (Australia) Alan Shepherd (Australia) Paul Stubber	3.0 L BMW N55 I6	106	Spun off
DNF	C	44	(Australia) Donut King Racing	(Australia) Tony Alford (Australia) Peter Leemhuis (Australia) Mal Rose	Nissan R35 GT-R	102	Gearbox/Accident
DNF	C	44	(Australia) Donut King Racing	(Australia) Tony Alford (Australia) Peter Leemhuis (Australia) Mal Rose	3.8 L Twin-turbo VR38DETT V6	102	Gearbox/Accident
DNF	A	2	(Australia) Procon Developments	(Australia) Geoff Emery (Australia) Dean Grant (Australia) Max Twigg	Mosler MT900 GT3	11	Accident
DNF	A	2	(Australia) Procon Developments	(Australia) Geoff Emery (Australia) Dean Grant (Australia) Max Twigg	7.0 L LS7 V8	11	Accident

* The 242 laps for 12th placed Car No. 80 includes a 3-lap penalty

== Statistics ==
- Pole Position – #7 Mark Eddy, Craig Lowndes, Warren Luff
- Fastest Lap – #7 Craig Lowndes – 2:09.0861 (GT lap record) on lap 267

* Grid positions were taken on the lap average of the fastest times set by all drivers in a car, e.g Steve Owen set the fastest time of all cars with a GT qualifying record of 2:09.1015 in his Porsche 997 GT3 Cup S but the times of co-drivers James and Theo Koundouris averaged out to start the car 3rd behind the two Joest Racing Audi R8 LMS GT3's. Warren Luff had the overall 2nd fastest qualifying time in his Audi R8 (2:09.6360) but the times of co-drivers Mark Eddy and Craig Lowndes saw the #7 car start from pole position.

* Craig Lowndes fastest race lap in the #7 Audi, set on lap 267 of 292 when the car had already covered 1,652km, was not only a new GT lap record for the Mt Panorama Circuit but undercut Owen's qualifying record by 0.0154 seconds.
