= 2011 FIA WTCC Race of Japan =

Race details
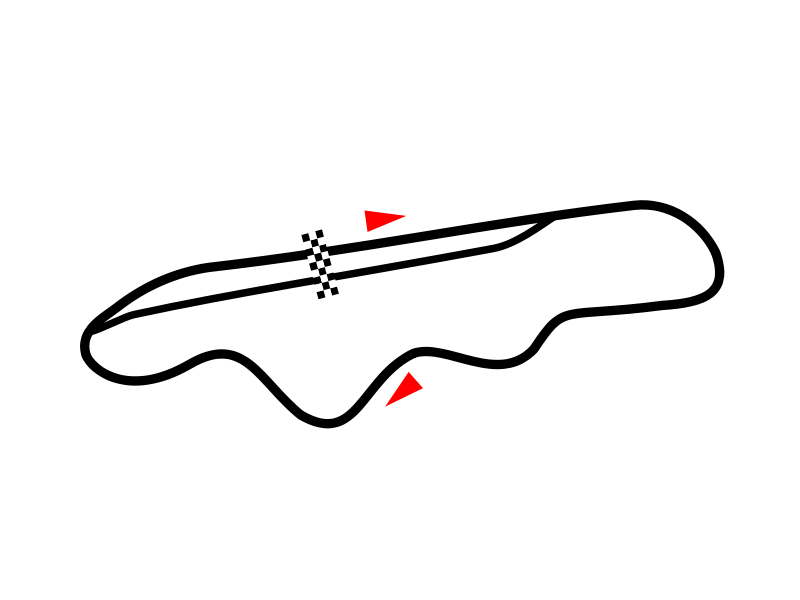
- Round 10 of 12 in the 2011 World Touring Car Championship at Suzuka Circuit in Suzuka City, Japan.
- Date: 23 October, 2011
- Location: Suzuka City, Japan
- Course: Suzuka Circuit; 2.243 kilometres (1.394 mi)

Race One
- Laps: 25
Pole position
Driver		(Switzerland) Alain Menu	Chevrolet RML
Time		53.443	
Podium
First		(Switzerland) Alain Menu	Chevrolet RML
Second		(United Kingdom) Robert Huff	Chevrolet RML
Third		(Denmark) Michel Nykjær	SUNRED Engineering
Fastest Lap
Driver		(Switzerland) Alain Menu	Chevrolet RML
Time		54.521	

Race Two
- Laps: 23
Podium
First		(Netherlands) Tom Coronel	ROAL Motorsport
Second		(France) Yvan Muller	Chevrolet RML
Third		(United Kingdom) Robert Huff	Chevrolet RML
Fastest Lap
Driver		(Sweden) Robert Dahlgren	Polestar Racing
Time		54.116	

The 2011 FIA WTCC Race of Japan was the tenth round of the 2011 World Touring Car Championship season and the fourth running of the FIA WTCC Race of Japan. It was held on 23 October 2011 at the Suzuka Circuit in Suzuka City, Japan.

The first race was won by Alain Menu of Chevrolet RML while Michel Nykjær finished on the podium for the first time in World Touring Car Championship. The second race was won by Tom Coronel of ROAL Motorsport.

== Background ==
Coming into the first Asian round of the season, Yvan Muller was leading the world drivers' championship. Kristian Poulsen was leading the Yokohama Independents' Trophy.

Chevrolet RML added a fourth Chevrolet Cruze for the local rally driver Toshi Arai. Formula D driver Charles Ng joined Liqui Moly Team Engstler in a BMW 320si while Hiroki Yoshimoto joined SUNRED Engineering to drive one of their SUNRED SR León 1.6Ts. Colin Turkington returned to Wiechers-Sport having last raced for them at the Race of UK. Masaki Kano drove for DeTeam KK Motorsport in their BMW 320 TC.

== Report ==
=== Testing and free practice ===
Menu led Friday's test session having displaced Polestar Racing's Robert Dahlgren late on. Robert Huff, who had lost his championship lead at the last round was third with Tiago Monteiro separating him from championship leader Muller. Darryl O'Young in the bamboo-engineering Chevrolet was the quickest independent driver when he ended the session ninth. The session had been stopped five minutes in when Norbert Michelisz went off the circuit.

Huff topped the wet first practice session on Saturday morning. Fabio Fabiani and Kano were black flagged for not having their headlights switched on.

The track was drying in free practice two as Menu set the fastest time, he led a Chevrolet 1–2–3 with Muller second and Huff third. Fredy Barth was the top independent driver in fourth.

=== Qualifying ===
Qualifying had started with a threat of rain as Menu took pole position in qualifying with championship leading team–mate Muller second. The first session was stopped twice, firstly when Proteam Racing's Mehdi Bennani got stuck in the gravel at the final corner and then again when Pepe Oriola also went off at the final corner and crashed into the wall. O'Young finished the first session tenth and therefore took the reversed grid pole position for race two where he would be joined on the front row by Coronel. Yukinori Taniguchi was 12th at the end of the session and was the quickest local driver.

All the drivers taking part in the second session set their best times in their early runs. At the end of Q2 Menu was ahead of Muller and Dahlgren. Nykjær was the best placed independent driver in seventh.

Fabiani had again failed to get within 107% of the fastest Q1 time but was not allowed to start the races after an altercation with the stewards as well as having incurred a number of other penalties already. Oriola required an engine change and would therefore take a five–place grid drop in race one while Arai failed to report to scrutineering during Q1 so his qualifying times were removed.

=== Warm-Up ===
Pole sitter Menu led the warm–up session before the first race, the session came to a close early when Yoshimoto ended up in the gravel.

=== Race One ===
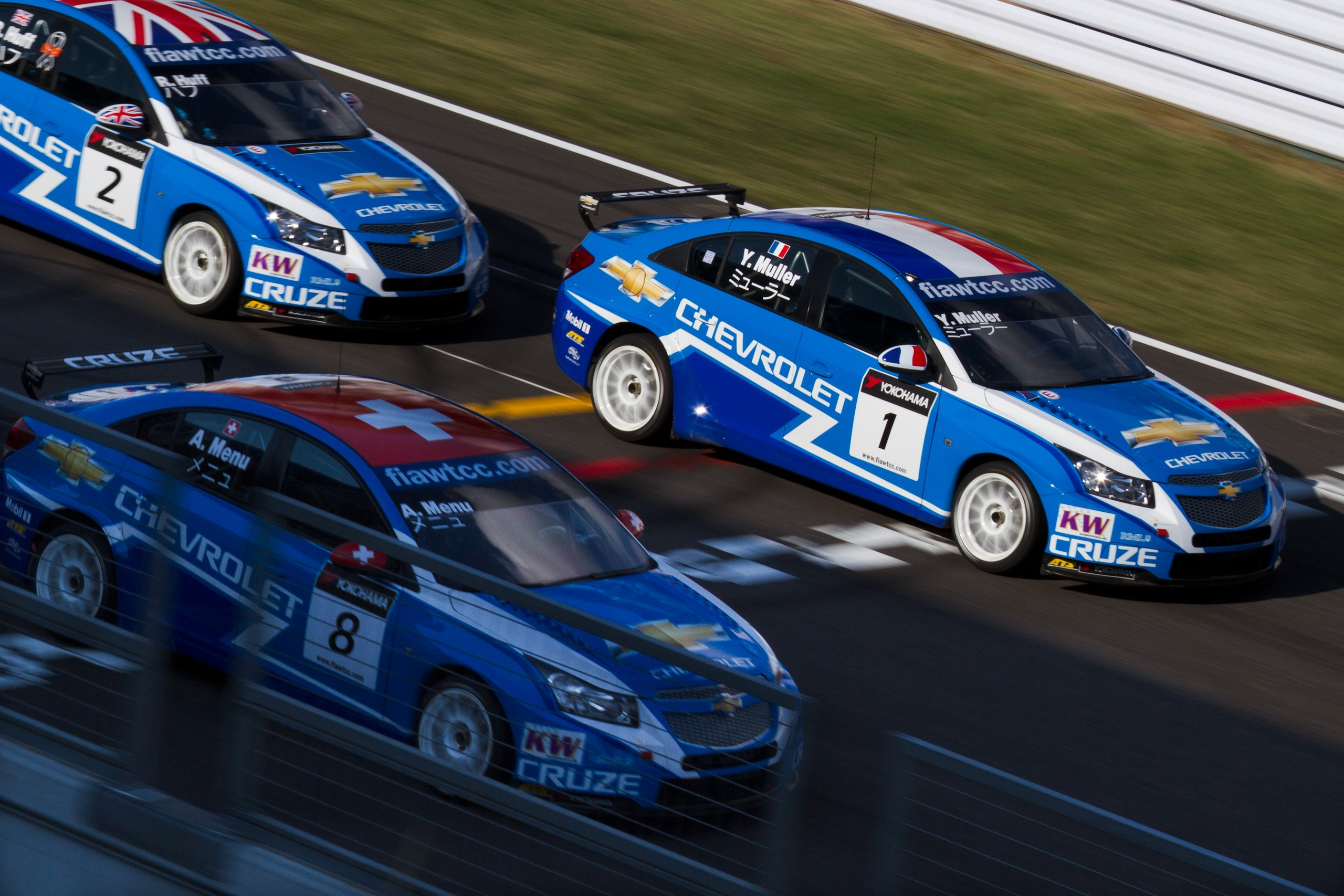
Menu, Muller and Huff at the start of Race One

Menu started from pole position while Dahlgren behind was tagged by Nykjær which saw the Volvo driver spin and come back across the track at the first corner as the rest of the field passed. Coronel and Tarquini then came together which caught out Tiago Monteiro, Javier Villa, Barth and Yoshimoto; Tarquini and Villa were able to continue. The safety car was brought out while the stranded cars were removed, when the race resumed on lap seven it was Muller leading from Menu and Huff. The following lap Menu was able to make a successful pass for the lead, two laps later Muller then made a mistake and dropped behind Huff and Nykjær. Aleksei Dudukalo had a narrow escape when he spun on the exit of the final corner and came close to hitting the pit wall while team–mate Tarquini had recovered to ninth place after his first lap collision. At the end of the race, Menu led a Chevrolet 1–2 with Huff while Nykjær claimed his first outright podium result in third and the independents' victory with it. Muller was fourth while Taniguchi claimed his best result in the championship by finishing seventh behind Turkington. Bennani in eighth resisted a late charge from Tarquini.

=== Race Two ===
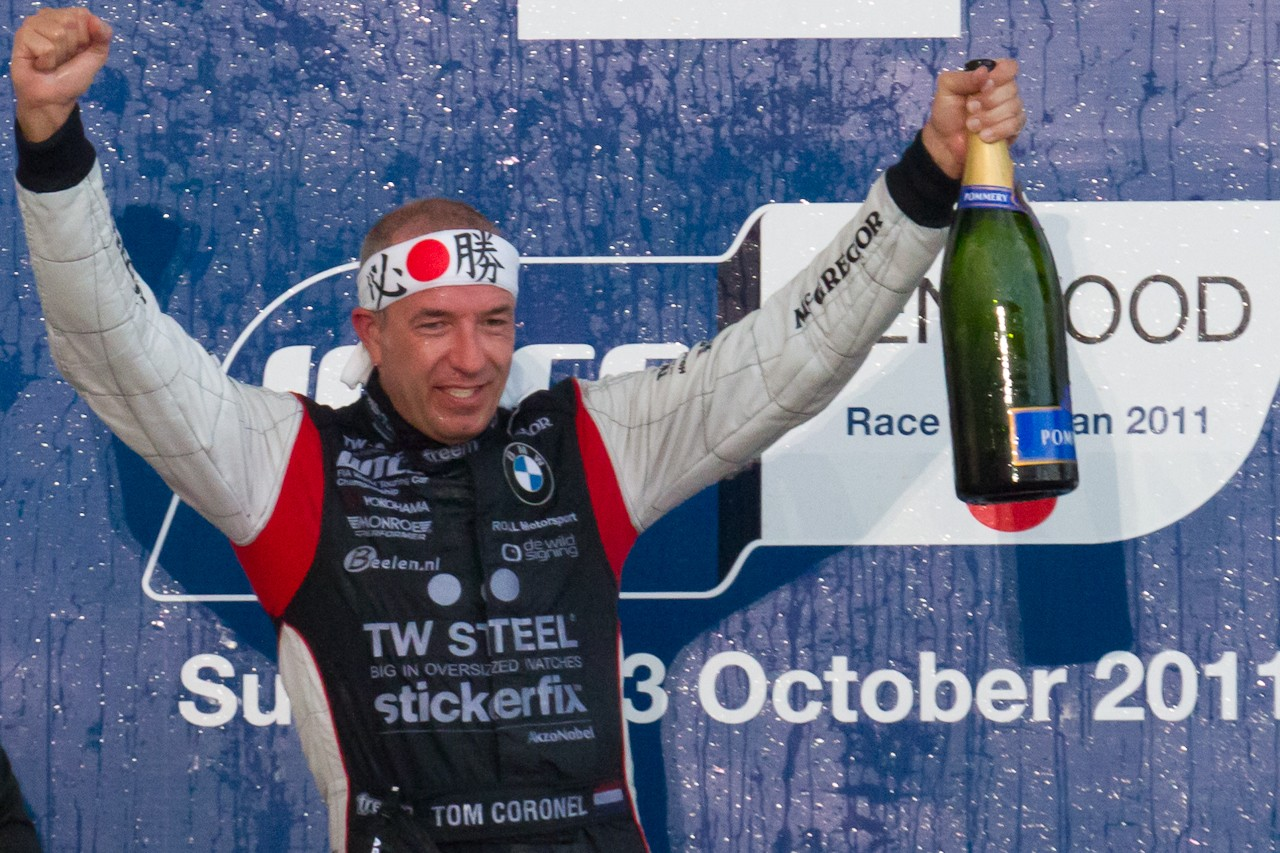
Race Two winner Tom Coronel on the podium

Rain had started to fall before the start of the race. O'Young started on pole position but he was passed straight away by Coronel as O'Young was tapped by Tarquini and spun. Dahlgren had got through to fourth at the expense of Menu while Muller and Huff were closing in on Coronel. Tarquini was served with a drive–through penalty on lap five for the collision with O'Young, he went into the pits for his penalty before retiring on lap twelve. Having previously attempted a pass on Huff for third, Dahlgren was re–passed by Menu as his Volvo C30 Drive was plagued by a misfiring engine. Coronel beat Muller to the line by inches, Huff was third and Menu was fourth. Dahlgren ended up fifth while Nykjær in sixth was the Yokohama Trophy victor once again.

== Results ==
=== Qualifying ===
Pos.	No.	Name	Team	Car	C	Q1	Q2
1	8	(Switzerland) Alain Menu	Chevrolet RML	Chevrolet Cruze 1.6T		53.748	53.443
2	1	(France) Yvan Muller	Chevrolet RML	Chevrolet Cruze 1.6T		53.893	53.492
3	30	(Sweden) Robert Dahlgren	Polestar Racing	Volvo C30 Drive		53.760	53.512
4	2	(United Kingdom) Robert Huff	Chevrolet RML	Chevrolet Cruze 1.6T		53.937	53.520
5	15	(Netherlands) Tom Coronel	ROAL Motorsport	BMW 320 TC		53.943	53.601
6	18	(Portugal) Tiago Monteiro	SUNRED Engineering	SUNRED SR León 1.6T		53.871	53.798
7	17	(Denmark) Michel Nykjær	SUNRED Engineering	SUNRED SR León 1.6T	Y	53.725	53.811
8	3	(Italy) Gabriele Tarquini	Lukoil-SUNRED	SUNRED SR León 1.6T		53.734	53.824
9	9	(Hong Kong) **Darryl O'Young**	bamboo-engineering	Chevrolet Cruze 1.6T	Y	53.956	53.902
10	29	(United Kingdom) Colin Turkington	Wiechers-Sport	BMW 320 TC	Y	53.672	54.339
11	20	(Spain) Javier Villa	Proteam Racing	BMW 320 TC	Y	54.006	
12	10	(Japan) Yukinori Taniguchi	bamboo-engineering	Chevrolet Cruze 1.6T	Y	54.070	
13	5	(Hungary) Norbert Michelisz	Zengő-Dension Team	BMW 320 TC	Y	54.073	
14	11	(Denmark) Kristian Poulsen	Liqui Moly Team Engstler	BMW 320 TC	Y	54.126	
15	4	(Russia) Aleksei Dudukalo	Lukoil-SUNRED	SUNRED SR León 1.6T	Y	54.127	
16	12	(Germany) Franz Engstler	Liqui Moly Team Engstler	BMW 320 TC	Y	54.219	
17	7	(Switzerland) Fredy Barth	SEAT Swiss Racing by SUNRED	SUNRED SR León 1.6T	Y	54.411	
18	88	(Japan) Hiroki Yoshimoto	SEAT Swiss Racing by SUNRED	SUNRED SR León 1.6T	Y	54.466	
19	74	(Spain) Pepe Oriola	SUNRED Engineering	SUNRED SR León 1.6T	Y	54.730	
20	25	(Morocco) Mehdi Bennani	Proteam Racing	BMW 320 TC	Y	55.002	
21	51	(Hong Kong) Charles Ng	Liqui Moly Team Engstler	BMW 320si	Y	55.356	
22	68	(Japan) Masaki Kano	DeTeam KK Motorsport	BMW 320 TC	Y	55.551	
EX^{1}	31	(Japan) Toshi Arai	Chevrolet RML	Chevrolet Cruze 1.6T		Excluded	
107% time: 57.429
–	21	(Italy) Fabio Fabiani	Proteam Racing	BMW 320si	Y	58.023	

- **Bold** denotes Pole position for second race.

^1 — Arai failed to report to the weighbridge during qualifying and so his times from the session were deleted.

=== Race 1 ===
Pos.	No.	Name	Team	Car	C	Laps	Time/Retired	Grid	Points
1	8	(Switzerland) **Alain Menu**	Chevrolet RML	Chevrolet Cruze 1.6T		25	25:50.919	1	25
2	2	(United Kingdom) Robert Huff	Chevrolet RML	Chevrolet Cruze 1.6T		25	+3.133	4	18
3	17	(Denmark) Michel Nykjær	SUNRED Engineering	SUNRED SR León 1.6T	Y	25	+3.766	7	15
4	1	(France) Yvan Muller	Chevrolet RML	Chevrolet Cruze 1.6T		25	+4.441	2	12
5	11	(Denmark) Kristian Poulsen	Liqui Moly Team Engstler	BMW 320 TC	Y	25	+4.851	14	10
6	29	(United Kingdom) Colin Turkington	Wiechers-Sport	BMW 320 TC	Y	25	+8.601	10	8
7	10	(Japan) Yukinori Taniguchi	bamboo-engineering	Chevrolet Cruze 1.6T	Y	25	+13.472	12	6
8	25	(Morocco) Mehdi Bennani	Proteam Racing	BMW 320 TC	Y	25	+13.730	19	4
9	3	(Italy) Gabriele Tarquini	Lukoil-SUNRED	SUNRED SR León 1.6T		25	+14.045	8	2
10	12	(Germany) Franz Engstler	Liqui Moly Team Engstler	BMW 320 TC	Y	25	+15.950	16	1
11	9	(Hong Kong) Darryl O'Young	bamboo-engineering	Chevrolet Cruze 1.6T	Y	25	+20.833	9	
12	68	(Japan) Masaki Kano	DeTeam KK Motorsport	BMW 320 TC	Y	25	+25.889	20	
13	31	(Japan) Toshi Arai	Chevrolet RML	Chevrolet Cruze 1.6T		25	+26.767	21	
14	51	(Hong Kong) Charles Ng	Liqui Moly Team Engstler	BMW 320si	Y	25	+39.298	23	
15	5	(Hungary) Norbert Michelisz	Zengő-Dension Team	BMW 320 TC	Y	25	+44.478	13	
16	20	(Spain) Javier Villa	Proteam Racing	BMW 320 TC	Y	25	+50.554	11	
17	4	(Russia) Aleksei Dudukalo	Lukoil-SUNRED	SUNRED SR León 1.6T	Y	25	+1:16.031	15	
18	74	(Spain) Pepe Oriola	SUNRED Engineering	SUNRED SR León 1.6T	Y	20	+5 Laps	22	
Ret	88	(Japan) Hiroki Yoshimoto	SEAT Swiss Racing by SUNRED	SUNRED SR León 1.6T	Y	11	Race incident	18	
NC	15	(Netherlands) Tom Coronel	ROAL Motorsport	BMW 320 TC		5	+20 Laps	5	
Ret	7	(Switzerland) Fredy Barth	SEAT Swiss Racing by SUNRED	SUNRED SR León 1.6T	Y	2	Race incident	17	
Ret	30	(Sweden) Robert Dahlgren	Polestar Racing	Volvo C30 Drive		0	Race incident	3	
Ret	18	(Portugal) Tiago Monteiro	SUNRED Engineering	SUNRED SR León 1.6T		0	Race incident	6	

- **Bold** denotes Fastest lap.

=== Race 2 ===
Pos.	No.	Name	Team	Car	C	Laps	Time/Retired	Grid	Points
1	15	(Netherlands) Tom Coronel	ROAL Motorsport	BMW 320 TC		23	21:10.854	2	25
2	1	(France) Yvan Muller	Chevrolet RML	Chevrolet Cruze 1.6T		23	+0.558	4	18
3	2	(United Kingdom) Robert Huff	Chevrolet RML	Chevrolet Cruze 1.6T		23	+0.840	3	15
4	8	(Switzerland) Alain Menu	Chevrolet RML	Chevrolet Cruze 1.6T		23	+1.576	6	12
5	30	(Sweden) **Robert Dahlgren**	Polestar Racing	Volvo C30 Drive		23	+2.057	5	10
6	17	(Denmark) Michel Nykjær	SUNRED Engineering	SUNRED SR León 1.6T	Y	23	+7.397	8	8
7	29	(United Kingdom) Colin Turkington	Wiechers-Sport	BMW 320 TC	Y	23	+7.730	9	6
8	20	(Spain) Javier Villa	Proteam Racing	BMW 320 TC	Y	23	+8.292	10	4
9	5	(Hungary) Norbert Michelisz	Zengő-Dension Team	BMW 320 TC	Y	23	+8.606	12	2
10	11	(Denmark) Kristian Poulsen	Liqui Moly Team Engstler	BMW 320 TC	Y	23	+8.901	13	1
11	12	(Germany) Franz Engstler	Liqui Moly Team Engstler	BMW 320 TC	Y	23	+9.477	15	
12	4	(Russia) Aleksei Dudukalo	Lukoil-SUNRED	SUNRED SR León 1.6T	Y	23	+15.744	14	
13	74	(Spain) Pepe Oriola	SUNRED Engineering	SUNRED SR León 1.6T	Y	23	+22.668	17	
14	10	(Japan) Yukinori Taniguchi	bamboo-engineering	Chevrolet Cruze 1.6T	Y	23	+23.263	11	
15	31	(Japan) Toshi Arai	Chevrolet RML	Chevrolet Cruze 1.6T		23	+23.541	21	
16	68	(Japan) Masaki Kano	DeTeam KK Motorsport	BMW 320 TC	Y	23	+25.577	20	
17	88	(Japan) Hiroki Yoshimoto	SEAT Swiss Racing by SUNRED	SUNRED SR León 1.6T	Y	23	+26.926	16	
18	25	(Morocco) Mehdi Bennani	Proteam Racing	BMW 320 TC	Y	23	+33.610	18	
19	51	(Hong Kong) Charles Ng	Liqui Moly Team Engstler	BMW 320si	Y	23	+34.092	19	
Ret	3	(Italy) Gabriele Tarquini	Lukoil-SUNRED	SUNRED SR León 1.6T		11	Withdrew	7	
Ret	9	(Hong Kong) Darryl O'Young	bamboo-engineering	Chevrolet Cruze 1.6T	Y	1	Race incident	1	
DNS	18	(Portugal) Tiago Monteiro	SUNRED Engineering	SUNRED SR León 1.6T		0	Did not start	22	
DNS	7	(Switzerland) Fredy Barth	SEAT Swiss Racing by SUNRED	SUNRED SR León 1.6T	Y	0	Did not start	23	

- **Bold** denotes Fastest lap.

== Standings after the event ==
Drivers' Championship standings

Pos	Driver	Points
1	(France) Yvan Muller	363
2	(United Kingdom) Robert Huff	350
3	(Switzerland) Alain Menu	290
4	(Netherlands) Tom Coronel	183
5	(Italy) Gabriele Tarquini	159

Yokohama Independents' Trophy standings

	Pos	Driver	Points
	1	(Denmark) Kristian Poulsen	111
	2	(Hungary) Norbert Michelisz	100
3	3	(Denmark) Michel Nykjær	96
1	4	(Germany) Franz Engstler	88
1	5	(Spain) Javier Villa	87

Manufacturers' Championship standings

Pos	Manufacturer	Points
1	(United States) Chevrolet	810
2	(Germany) BMW Customer Racing Teams	485
3	(Spain) SR Customer Racing	435
4	(Sweden) Volvo Polestar Evaluation Team	138

- Note: Only the top five positions are included for both sets of drivers' standings.
