= 2010 FIA WTCC Race of Spain =

Motorsport championship

Race details
- Round 9 of 11 in the 2010 World Touring Car Championship at Circuit Ricardo Tormo in Valencia, Spain.
- Date: 19 September, 2010
- Location: Valencia, Spain
- Course: Circuit Ricardo Tormo; 4.005 kilometres (2.489 mi)

Race One
- Laps: 13
Pole position
Driver		(Italy) Gabriele Tarquini	SR-Sport
Time		1:44.111	
Podium
First		(Italy) Gabriele Tarquini	SR-Sport
Second		(France) Yvan Muller	Chevrolet RML
Third		(United Kingdom) Robert Huff	Chevrolet RML
Fastest Lap
Driver		(Italy) Gabriele Tarquini	SR-Sport
Time		1:45.811	

Race Two
- Laps: 13
Podium
First		(Portugal) Tiago Monteiro	SR-Sport
Second		(France) Yvan Muller	Chevrolet RML
Third		(Italy) Gabriele Tarquini	SR-Sport
Fastest Lap
Driver		(Portugal) Tiago Monteiro	SR-Sport
Time		1:46.719	

The 2010 FIA WTCC Race of Spain (formally the 2010 FIA WTCC DHL Race of Spain) was the ninth round of the 2010 World Touring Car Championship season and the sixth running of the FIA WTCC Race of Spain. It was held at the Circuit Ricardo Tormo near Valencia, Spain on 19 September 2010. The two races were won by SR-Sport drivers Gabriele Tarquini and Tiago Monteiro.

== Background ==
Coming into the final European round of the season, Chevrolet RML driver Yvan Muller was leading the drivers' championship and Sergio Hernández was leading the Yokohama Independents' Trophy.

Marc Carol joined the field in a SEAT Customers Technology run SEAT León 2.0 TFSI. Carol had last raced in the World Touring Car Championship at the 2005 FIA WTCC Race of Spain. Fabio Fabiani didn't return after the Race of Germany.

== Report ==
=== Free practice ===
BMW Team RBM's Augusto Farfus was fastest in the opening practice session on Saturday morning, beating the lead Chevrolet of Alain Menu. Gabriele Tarquini was the leading SEAT in fifth while Carol was the quickest independent driver on his return to the WTCC.

SR–Sport's Tom Coronel set the pace in the final practice session, edging out Menu by a tenth of a second. Kristian Poulsen was both the leading independent and BMW driver in seventh.

=== Qualifying ===
Tarquini took pole position in qualifying for the first race on Sunday, beating the Chevrolet of Robert Huff. Fredy Barth had been the fastest driver in the first element of qualifying, beating the works Chevrolet drivers. Norbert Michelisz suffered an engine failure during Q1, finishing thirteenth while Franz Engstler ended his session in the gravel after setting a time good enough for fourteenth. Andy Priaulx narrowly made it through to Q2, finishing the session tenth at the expense of Michel Nykjær.

Tarquini set his pole time early on while later fast laps from Huff and Muller saw them finish second and third ahead of Menu who was hampered with gearbox problems. Tiago Monteiro and Coronel, who would take a ten place grid penalty for an unscheduled engine change. Jordi Gené, Barth and the works BMW pair of Priaulx and Farfus completed the top ten.

=== Warm-Up ===
Michelisz led Sunday morning's warm–up session with pole sitter Tarquini half a second behind.

=== Race One ===
Tarquini led away from pole position while further down, Priaulx moved up from ninth to sixth. Muller easily got ahead of Huff to take second place in opening laps while Barth and Farfus were battling over who would start on the front row for race two. Menu had dropped down the order to claim the reversed grid pole as Barth repeatedly tapped Farfus' rear bumper. The BMW eventually went wide, giving sevenths place to Barth. At the front, Tarquini took the win with Muller second and Huff third. Gené was fourth, Priaulx finished fifth and Monteiro was sixth. Poulsen was twelfth and won the independents' class.

=== Race Two ===
Menu started on pole position and was followed by Barth, the two were then passed up each side by Monteiro on the outside and Priaulx on the inside. Priaulx and Menu then collided, allowing Monteiro to assume the lead and Barth took second place. Priaulx attempted another move on Menu at turn three but the Chevrolet took the normal line through the corner, the pair collided and Menu spun. Priaulx was delayed but Muller took the opportunity to pass both of them and take third, he then took second from Barth when the Swiss SEAT driver slowed with a puncture. Priaulx was left to battle with Tarquini for third, with Tarquini coming out on top. At the end of the race, Monteiro took the win with Muller second and Tarquini third. Poulsen was the Yokohama Trophy winner.

== Results ==
=== Qualifying ===
Pos.	No.	Name	Team	Car	C	Q1	Q2
1	1	(Italy) Gabriele Tarquini	SR-Sport	SEAT León 2.0 TDI		1:44.727	1:44.111
2	7	(United Kingdom) Robert Huff	Chevrolet RML	Chevrolet Cruze LT		1:44.937	1:44.193
3	6	(France) Yvan Muller	Chevrolet RML	Chevrolet Cruze LT		1:44.922	1:44.258
4	8	(Switzerland) Alain Menu	Chevrolet RML	Chevrolet Cruze LT		1:44.710	1:44.439
5	3	(Portugal) Tiago Monteiro	SR-Sport	SEAT León 2.0 TDI		1:44.869	1:44.468
6	2	(Netherlands) Tom Coronel	SR-Sport	SEAT León 2.0 TDI		1:44.789	1:44.525
7	4	(Spain) Jordi Gené	SR-Sport	SEAT León 2.0 TDI		1:44.897	1:44.773
8	18	(Switzerland) Fredy Barth	SEAT Swiss Racing by SUNRED	SEAT León 2.0 TDI		1:44.604	1:45.070
9	10	(Brazil) Augusto Farfus	BMW Team RBM	BMW 320si		1:44.823	1:45.205
10	11	(United Kingdom) Andy Priaulx	BMW Team RBM	BMW 320si		1:45.313	1:45.416
11	17	(Denmark) Michel Nykjær	SUNRED Engineering	SEAT León 2.0 TDI		1:45.339	
12	24	(Denmark) Kristian Poulsen	Poulsen Motorsport	BMW 320si	Y	1:45.607	
13	5	(Hungary) Norbert Michelisz	Zengő-Dension Team	SEAT León 2.0 TDI		1:45.741	
14	39	(Spain) Marc Carol	SEAT Customers Technology	SEAT León 2.0 TFSI	Y	1:45.837	
15	20	(Hong Kong) Darryl O'Young	bamboo-engineering	Chevrolet Lacetti	Y	1:46.017	
16	25	(Spain) Sergio Hernández	Scuderia Proteam Motorsport	BMW 320si	Y	1:46.116	
17	21	(Morocco) Mehdi Bennani	Wiechers-Sport	BMW 320si	Y	1:46.419	
18	15	(Germany) Franz Engstler	Liqui Moly Team Engstler	BMW 320si	Y	1:46.717	
19	26	(Italy) Stefano D'Aste	Scuderia Proteam Motorsport	BMW 320si	Y	1:46.783	
20	72	(Japan) Yukinori Taniguchi	bamboo-engineering	Chevrolet Lacetti	Y	1:46.997	
21	16	(Russia) Andrei Romanov	Liqui Moly Team Engstler	BMW 320si	Y	1:47.344	

=== Race 1 ===
Pos.	No.	Name	Team	Car	C	Laps	Time/Retired	Grid	Points
1	1	(Italy) **Gabriele Tarquini**	SR-Sport	SEAT León 2.0 TDI		13	23:11.124	1	25
2	6	(France) Yvan Muller	Chevrolet RML	Chevrolet Cruze LT		13	+0.513	3	18
3	7	(United Kingdom) Robert Huff	Chevrolet RML	Chevrolet Cruze LT		13	+6.318	2	15
4	4	(Spain) Jordi Gené	SR-Sport	SEAT León 2.0 TDI		13	+9.949	6	12
5	11	(United Kingdom) Andy Priaulx	BMW Team RBM	BMW 320si		13	+10.544	9	10
6	3	(Portugal) Tiago Monteiro	SR-Sport	SEAT León 2.0 TDI		13	+11.666	5	8
7	18	(Switzerland) Fredy Barth	SEAT Swiss Racing by SUNRED	SEAT León 2.0 TDI		13	+13.734	7	6
8	8	(Switzerland) Alain Menu	Chevrolet RML	Chevrolet Cruze LT		13	+14.521	4	4
9	17	(Denmark) Michel Nykjær	SUNRED Engineering	SEAT León 2.0 TDI		13	+16.586	10	2
10	2	(Netherlands) Tom Coronel	SR-Sport	SEAT León 2.0 TDI		13	+17.217	16	1
11	5	(Hungary) Norbert Michelisz	Zengő-Dension Team	SEAT León 2.0 TDI		13	+17.929	12	
12	24	(Denmark) Kristian Poulsen	Poulsen Motorsport	BMW 320si	Y	13	+18.434	11	
13	39	(Spain) Marc Carol	SEAT Customers Technology	SEAT León 2.0 TFSI	Y	13	+22.095	13	
14	20	(Hong Kong) Darryl O'Young	bamboo-engineering	Chevrolet Lacetti	Y	13	+25.535	14	
15	15	(Germany) Franz Engstler	Liqui Moly Team Engstler	BMW 320si	Y	13	+29.318	18	
16	16	(Russia) Andrei Romanov	Liqui Moly Team Engstler	BMW 320si	Y	13	+32.595	21	
17	72	(Japan) Yukinori Taniguchi	bamboo-engineering	Chevrolet Lacetti	Y	13	+37.004	20	
18	10	(Brazil) Augusto Farfus	BMW Team RBM	BMW 320si		13	+1:37.389	8	
19	25	(Spain) Sergio Hernández	Scuderia Proteam Motorsport	BMW 320si	Y	11	+2 Laps	15	
Ret	21	(Morocco) Mehdi Bennani	Wiechers-Sport	BMW 320si	Y	6	Driveshaft	17	
Ret	26	(Italy) Stefano D'Aste	Scuderia Proteam Motorsport	BMW 320si	Y	4	Race incident	19	

- **Bold** denotes Fastest lap.

=== Race 2 ===
Pos.	No.	Name	Team	Car	C	Laps	Time/Retired	Grid	Points
1	3	(Portugal) **Tiago Monteiro**	SR-Sport	SEAT León 2.0 TDI		13	23:29.770	3	25
2	6	(France) Yvan Muller	Chevrolet RML	Chevrolet Cruze LT		13	+0.719	7	18
3	1	(Italy) Gabriele Tarquini	SR-Sport	SEAT León 2.0 TDI		13	+3.455	8	15
4	11	(United Kingdom) Andy Priaulx	BMW Team RBM	BMW 320si		13	+3.785	4	12
5	4	(Spain) Jordi Gené	SR-Sport	SEAT León 2.0 TDI		13	+4.183	5	10
6	7	(United Kingdom) Robert Huff	Chevrolet RML	Chevrolet Cruze LT		13	+4.982	6	8
7	17	(Denmark) Michel Nykjær	SUNRED Engineering	SEAT León 2.0 TDI		13	+7.248	9	6
8	10	(Brazil) Augusto Farfus	BMW Team RBM	BMW 320si		13	+7.825	18	4
9	2	(Netherlands) Tom Coronel	SR-Sport	SEAT León 2.0 TDI		13	+9.024	10	2
10	24	(Denmark) Kristian Poulsen	Poulsen Motorsport	BMW 320si	Y	13	+10.125	12	1
11	8	(Switzerland) Alain Menu	Chevrolet RML	Chevrolet Cruze LT		13	+13.356	1	
12	5	(Hungary) Norbert Michelisz	Zengő-Dension Team	SEAT León 2.0 TDI		13	+15.226	11	
13	39	(Spain) Marc Carol	SEAT Customers Technology	SEAT León 2.0 TFSI	Y	13	+15.789	13	
14	15	(Germany) Franz Engstler	Liqui Moly Team Engstler	BMW 320si	Y	13	+15.954	15	
15	25	(Spain) Sergio Hernández	Scuderia Proteam Motorsport	BMW 320si	Y	13	+18.716	20	
16	21	(Morocco) Mehdi Bennani	Wiechers-Sport	BMW 320si	Y	13	+27.455	19	
17	20	(Hong Kong) Darryl O'Young	bamboo-engineering	Chevrolet Lacetti	Y	13	+29.011	14	
18	72	(Japan) Yukinori Taniguchi	bamboo-engineering	Chevrolet Lacetti	Y	13	+32.972	17	
19	16	(Russia) Andrei Romanov	Liqui Moly Team Engstler	BMW 320si	Y	13	+33.636	16	
Ret	18	(Switzerland) Fredy Barth	SEAT Swiss Racing by SUNRED	SEAT León 2.0 TDI		7	Brakes	2	
DNS	26	(Italy) Stefano D'Aste	Scuderia Proteam Motorsport	BMW 320si	Y	0	Did not start	21	

- **Bold** denotes Fastest lap.

== Standings after the event ==
Drivers' Championship standings

	Pos	Driver	Points
	1	(France) Yvan Muller	265
	2	(United Kingdom) Andy Priaulx	240
	3	(Italy) Gabriele Tarquini	236
	4	(United Kingdom) Robert Huff	196
2	5	(Portugal) Tiago Monteiro	158

Yokohama Independents' Trophy standings

	Pos	Driver	Points
	1	(Spain) Sergio Hernández	118
4	2	(Denmark) Kristian Poulsen	87
1	3	(Italy) Stefano D'Aste	86
1	4	(Hong Kong) Darryl O'Young	85
	5	(Germany) Franz Engstler	81

Manufacturers' Championship standings

	Pos	Manufacturer	Points
	1	(United States) Chevrolet	569
1	2	(Spain) SEAT Customers Technology	524
1	3	(Germany) BMW	491

- Note: Only the top five positions are included for both sets of drivers' standings.
