= Rob Huff =

British racing driver (born 1979)

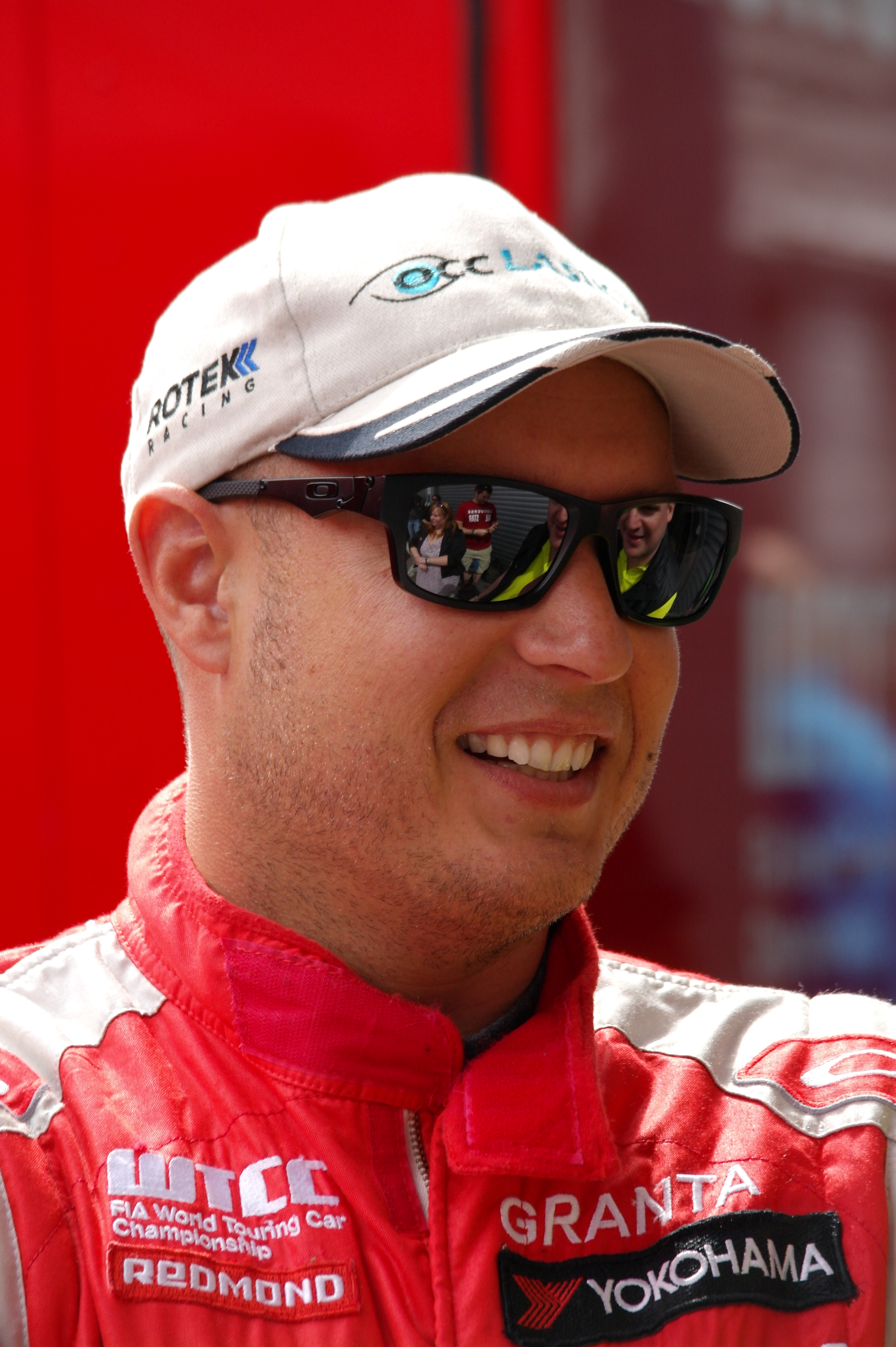
- Huff at the 2014 FIA WTCC Race of Belgium
- Nationality: (United Kingdom) British
- Born: Robert Peter Huff; 25 December 1979 (age 46) Cambridge, Cambridgeshire, England

World Touring Car Championship and World Touring Car Cup career
- Debut season: 2005
- Current team: Zengo Motorsport
- Car number: 12
- Former teams: Chevrolet, Lada Sport Rosneft, Castrol Honda World Touring Car Team, Münnich Motorsport, Sébastien Loeb Racing
- Starts: 286
- Wins: 30
- Poles: 15
- Fastest laps: 31
- Best finish: 1st in 2012

Previous series
- 2010 2004 2003 2002 2001 2000 2000: Ginetta G50 Cup; BTCC; SEAT Cupra Championship; Clio Cup GB; British Formula Renault; FPA Winter Series; Formula Vauxhall

Championship titles
- 2022 2020 2012 2003 2000: WTCR Trophy; TCR STCC; WTCC; SEAT Cupra Championship; Formula Vauxhall

Robert Peter Huff (born 25 December 1979) is a British racing driver currently competing in the British Touring Car Championship for Toyota Gazoo Racing UK. He was the 2012 World Touring Car Championship champion and the 2020 Scandinavian Touring Car Championship champion.

== Racing career ==
=== Early years ===
A Christmas Day birth in 1979 in Cambridge, Huff had a long junior career in karting. He attended St Faith's School and The Leys School, Cambridge, from 1993 to 1996. He won the 2000 Formula Vauxhall championship, and class B of the 2001 Ethyl MG Championship (also finishing as runner-up in this series in 2000). His father's Chartered Surveying firm has been one of his main sponsors.

=== British Touring Car Championship ===
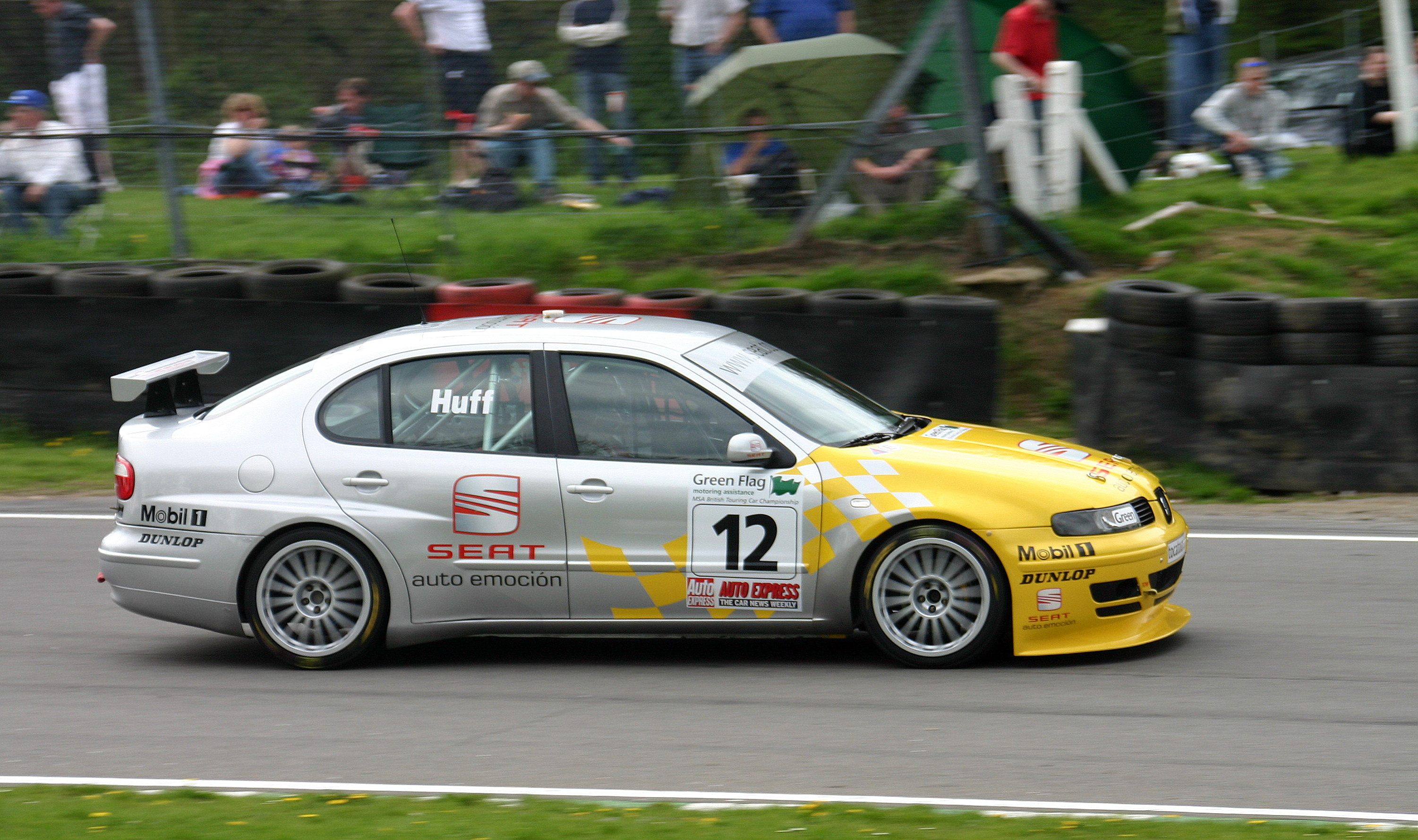
Huff driving for SEAT at Brands Hatch during the 2004 British Touring Car Championship season.

==== Debut with SEAT ====
Huff entered the big time by winning the inaugural SEAT Cupra Challenge in 2003, winning a paid drive in the British Touring Car Championship (BTCC) for the next season alongside former champion Jason Plato as a result. He battled on track with Plato in the second race at Thruxton but later lost his front splitter and retired, doing so again in the third race of the day. Huff started fifth at Brands Hatch and he was leading just before the safety car came out. He led away at the restart but was demoted to second by Matt Neal on the following lap and those position stuck until the end of the race, Huff claimed his first BTCC podium. He started round 8 at Silverstone on the reversed grid pole but second placed starter Kelvin Burt took the lead straight away and Huff soon fell victim to the Vauxhall of James Thompson. A collision with Michael Bentwood in the second race at Mondello Park meant Huff was disqualified and he started race three from the back. Huff eventually fell down to seventh place but he scored his second podium of the season in the third race. He claimed his first BTCC race win in round 24 at Brands Hatch and he repeated this success a fortnight later at Snetterton. He adjusted well, finishing seventh overall in the championship.

==== One-offs with PMR and Team HARD ====
In 2017, Huff made a return with PMR at Silverstone as a step in for Tom Chilton after he got ruled out on medical grounds. He led for a majority of race 3, but eventually dropped behind Matt Neal late in the race and finished second, scoring the team's best result of the season.

In 2023, Huff raced a Cupra Leon for Team HARD at Knockhill, replacing Nicolas Hamilton. He came 13th in Race 1, 14th in Race 2 and retired from Race 3, scoring five points.

==== Return with Speedworks ====
Huff returned to the BTCC full-time in 2024. He signed to drive a Toyota Corolla for Speedworks as part of an expanded four-car line-up.

Huff scored his first win in the reverse-grid race at Snetterton, where he led team-mates Aiden Moffat and Josh Cook to a Toyota 1-2-3. In doing so, he set a new record for the longest period between race wins in the BTCC at nearly 20 years, beating the previous record holder Dennis Leech by two years. He also won the reverse-grid race at Knockhill.

=== World Touring Car Championship ===
==== Chevrolet (2005–2012) ====
The SEAT BTCC team was run by Ray Mallock in 2004, and when his company took on the fledgling Chevrolet WTCC project, they retained Huff. At the season opening Race of Italy, he finished ahead of his more experienced teammates Alain Menu and Nicola Larini in race one. He collided with the BMW of Antonio García in his home race at Silverstone, forcing him to retire. In what was a difficult season with the new car, Huff's best result of 2005 was a sixth place in Mexico and with it he took the first points for the Lacetti in the WTCC. He finished the year joint 20th with Stéphane Ortelli in the drivers' championship with only the three points scored in Mexico. That year, he also did a one off in the guest car of the Porsche Carrera Cup GB, but collided with championship contender Tim Harvey in race one.

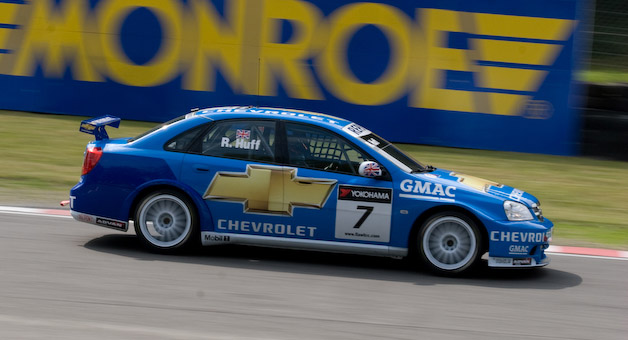
Huff driving the Chevrolet Lacetti WTCC car at Brands Hatch in 2008.

In 2006, Huff finished fourth at Brands Hatch, which was his best result of the first half of the season. He was taken to hospital after an accident at Puebla. At the following event at Brno in the Czech Republic, Huff started 24th due to two ten-place grid penalties, but he fought through to eighth place in the first race, which gave him pole for race 2 – giving him a lead he never relinquished en route to a first WTCC win, and the first for Chevrolet in the dry. However, the rest of the season was short on results, he finished 16th in the final standings.

There was an improvement in form once again from the Chevrolet team in 2007, Huff took a further win at the Scandinavian Raceway in Sweden, plus three more podiums, including his part in a Chevrolet 1–2–3 at Porto. These results ultimately left him ninth overall in the series, but behind team-mates Larini and Menu. The team took a win at every new circuit introduced for the 2007 season.

He opened 2008 with four pointless races, but came in first and second in the two races at Valencia. He was disqualified from the second race of the FIA WTCC Race of the Czech Republic due to his car having an illegal anti-roll bar linkage. At Brands Hatch he made his 100th WTCC start, qualifying third and taking the lead after a lap one collision between Menu and pole sitter Augusto Farfus. He led until a puncture three laps from the end. He finished the season third in the championship, behind SEAT drivers Yvan Muller and Gabriele Tarquini.

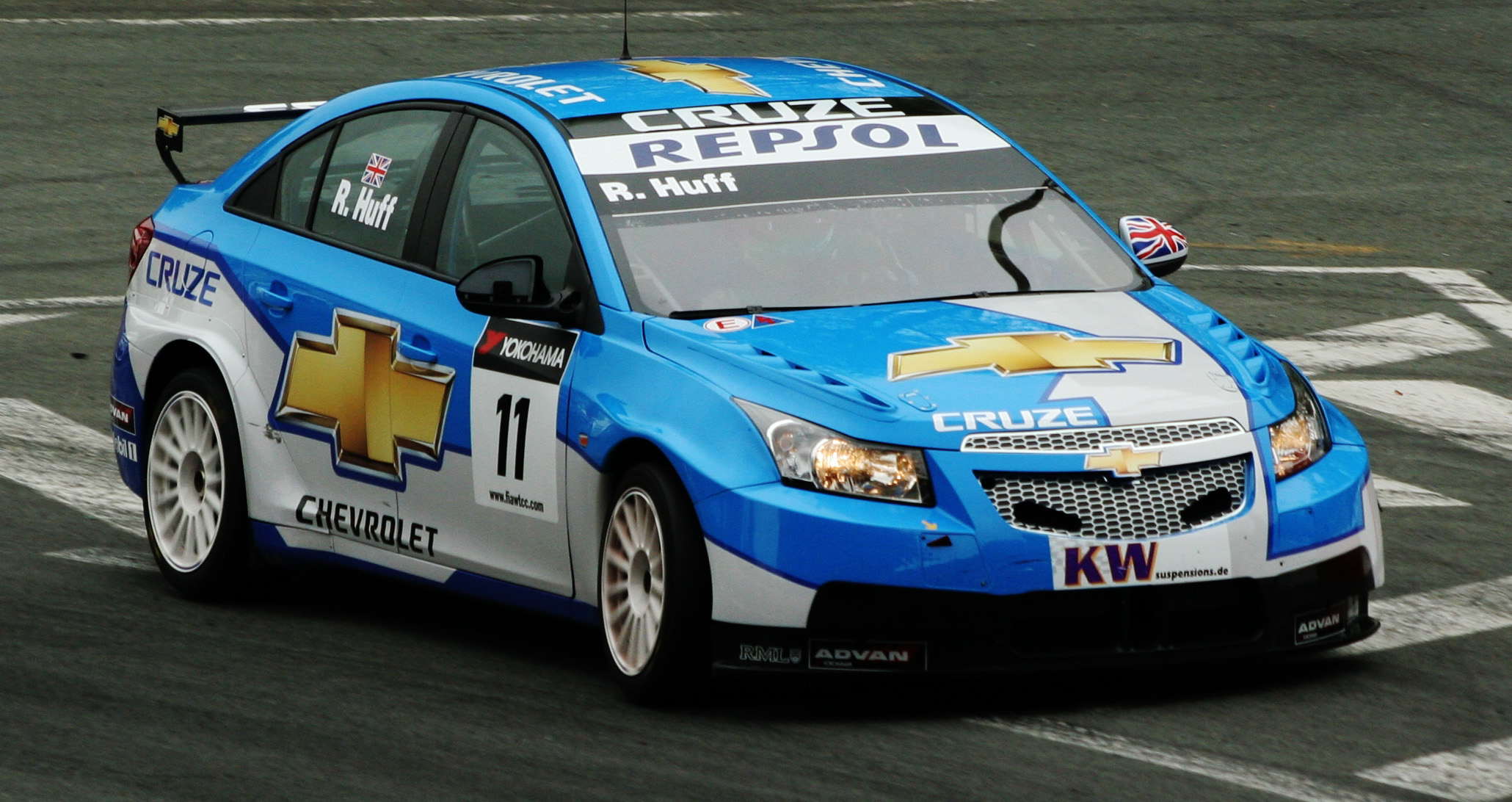
Huff driving the Chevrolet Cruze WTCC car at Pau in 2009.

For 2009, Chevrolet switched to the Cruze chassis. Huff did not make the best of starts to the season, failing to progress through to Q2 at the Race of Brazil and scoring no points. It was not until the Race of Morocco when things picked up; Huff took pole position and won the first race to take his first points of the season and the first win for the Chevrolet Cruze. He qualified fifth at the Race of France but a good start meant he passed pole sitter Andy Priaulx and then Farfus on the second lap to take his second win of the season. Huff qualified on the front row for his home event, the Race of UK. He passed pole sitter Menu and led away from the restart after the safety car but was re-passed Menu, depriving Huff of a home win and putting him under pressure from the BMW of Priaulx. Huff qualified sixth for the Race of Germany but dropped to sixteenth on the grid after an engine change incurred a ten-place grid penalty. A first lap incident in the first race eliminated Huff along with Jörg Müller, Jordi Gené and Farfus. Gené caused an accident in the first race of the Race of Italy, making contact with Huff under braking who then made contact with SEAT of Rickard Rydell. Huff escaped any serious damage to hold onto third. He took pole position for the season finale at Macau and dominated the first race. Huff finished the season ranked fifth in the championship, ahead of teammates Alain Menu and Nicola Larini.

In 2010, Huff finished the championship third behind new teammate Yvan Muller and Tarquini.

The Chevrolet Cruze was the dominant car in 2011, winning all but three races. The Chevrolet drivers were in a title battle all of their own, with Huff leading the championship early in the season. Muller took the lead later on, taking the battle right down to the last event at Macau. Huff won both races but this was not enough to stop Muller taking the title, his second with Chevrolet and his third in total.

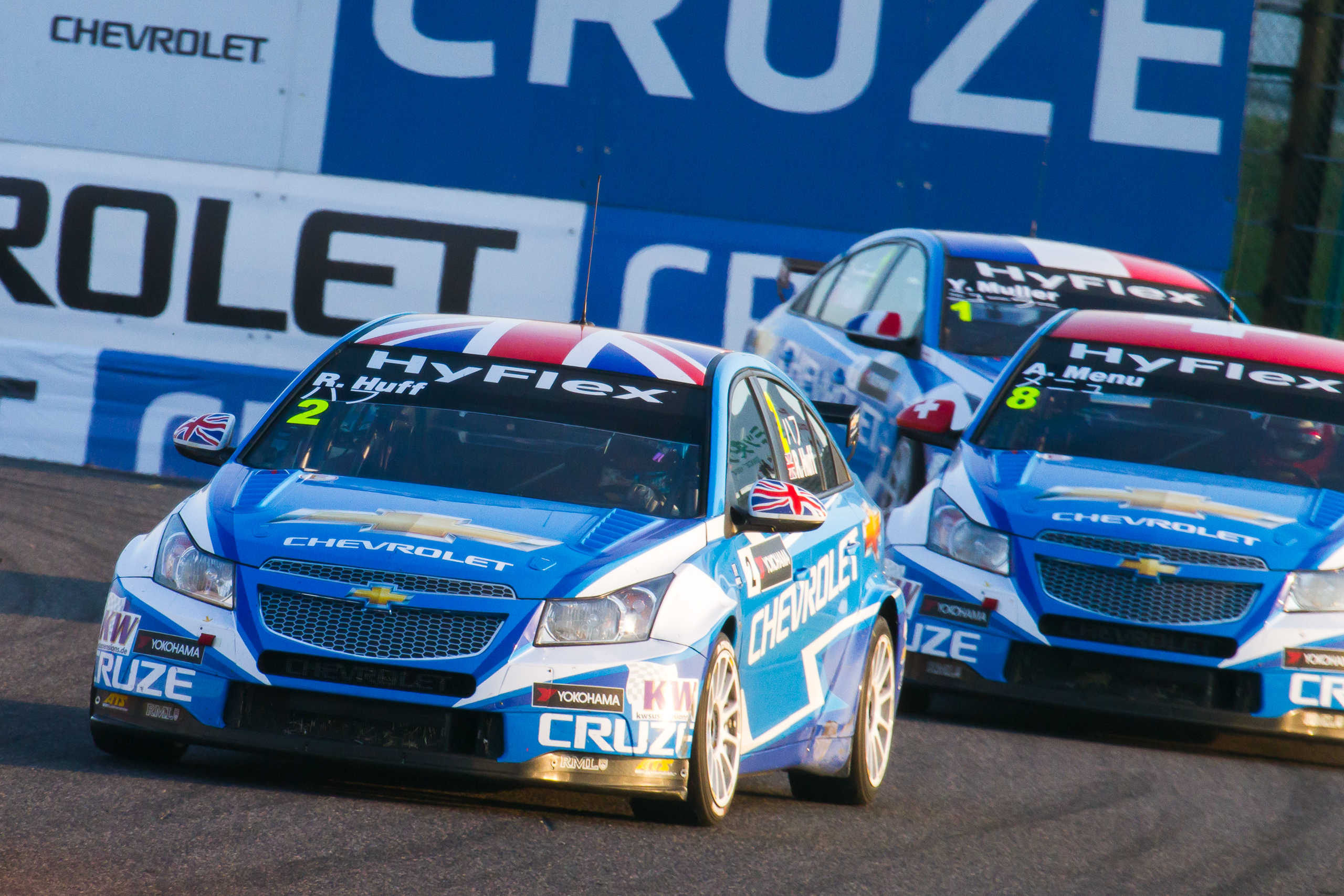
Huff leading team-mates Alain Menu and Yvan Muller at the 2012 FIA WTCC Race of Japan.

In 2012, Chevrolet announced this to be their last season in WTCC. The Chevy Cruze "blue train" with Huff, Yvan Muller and Alain Menu was again dominant over the field, taking 20 wins out of 24 races in the season. Muller took nine wins and led the championship for most of the season, Huff showed consistency and finished in the points for all the races except two. Finishing behind Muller did not seem enough until Muller tagged Menu from the lead in Shanghai, the penultimate round of the championship, sending Menu into a big slide and letting Huff through to overtake both of them and win the race. Menu lost a vital race win and Muller was given a penalty after the race, putting him out of the points altogether, giving Huff a big lead in the points. Menu was furious with Muller, saying "Yvan ruined both of their championships". In the final round in Macau, Huff was a clear favourite with a 37-point lead over Menu and 42 over Muller after qualifying on pole. In the first race though, drama unfolded. Huff lost the lead to Muller on lap one and overtook him on lap four to regain the lead but right after made a driving error and touched the barrier twice, forcing him to retire with damage. Muller won the race ahead of Menu, both reviving their chances for the championship. Huff's car got repaired for race two, with the help of both Menu's and Muller's crews in Chevrolet. Huff started the race eighth and had to finish fifth to secure the championship. On lap four, Yvan Muller ran into the back of Alex MacDowall's Chevrolet coming out of Mandarin, the fastest corner in the WTCC calendar, which spun MacDowall into the wall hard. The race was effectively finished with two safety car periods. Huff finished the race second behind Menu and ahead of Muller, with Chevrolet's campaign in World Touring Cars ending on another 1–2–3 finish for the team. Second place points were more than enough for Huff to win his first World Touring Car title and the first title for a British driver since Andy Priaulx in 2007.

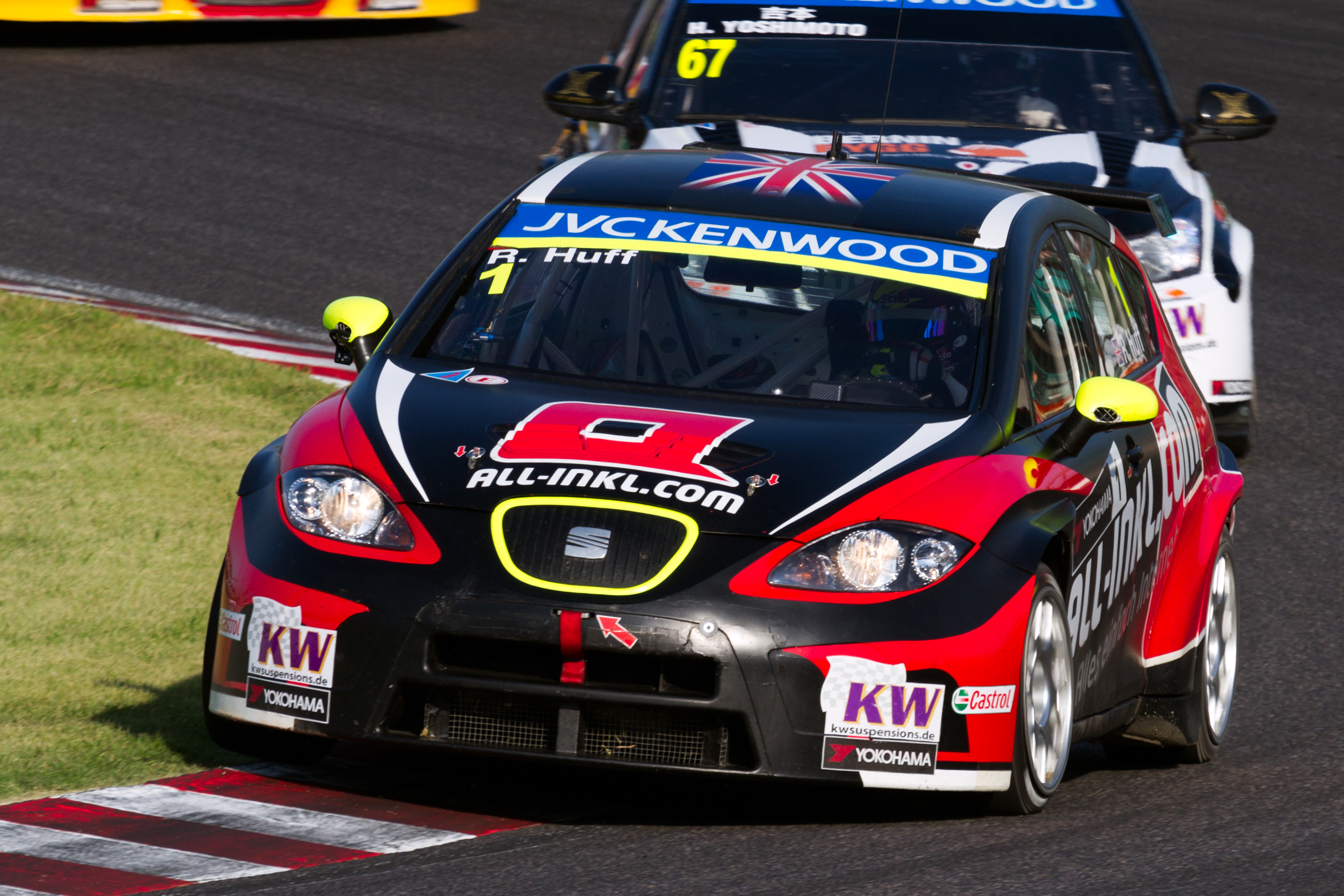
Huff during qualifying in Japan.

==== Münnich Motorsport (2013) ====
Huff joined ALL-INKL.COM Münnich Motorsport in February 2013, driving one of the team's SEAT León WTCCs and replacing Markus Winkelhock in their line-up for the 2013 season. He failed to set a time in qualifying for the Race of Italy having collided with the Wiechers-Sport car of Fredy Barth in the first few minutes of Q1 and breaking his suspension. He was allowed to start the races from the back and climbed up to sixth place at the end of race one. His car received further attention prior to the start of race two and he started from the pit lane and finished tenth.

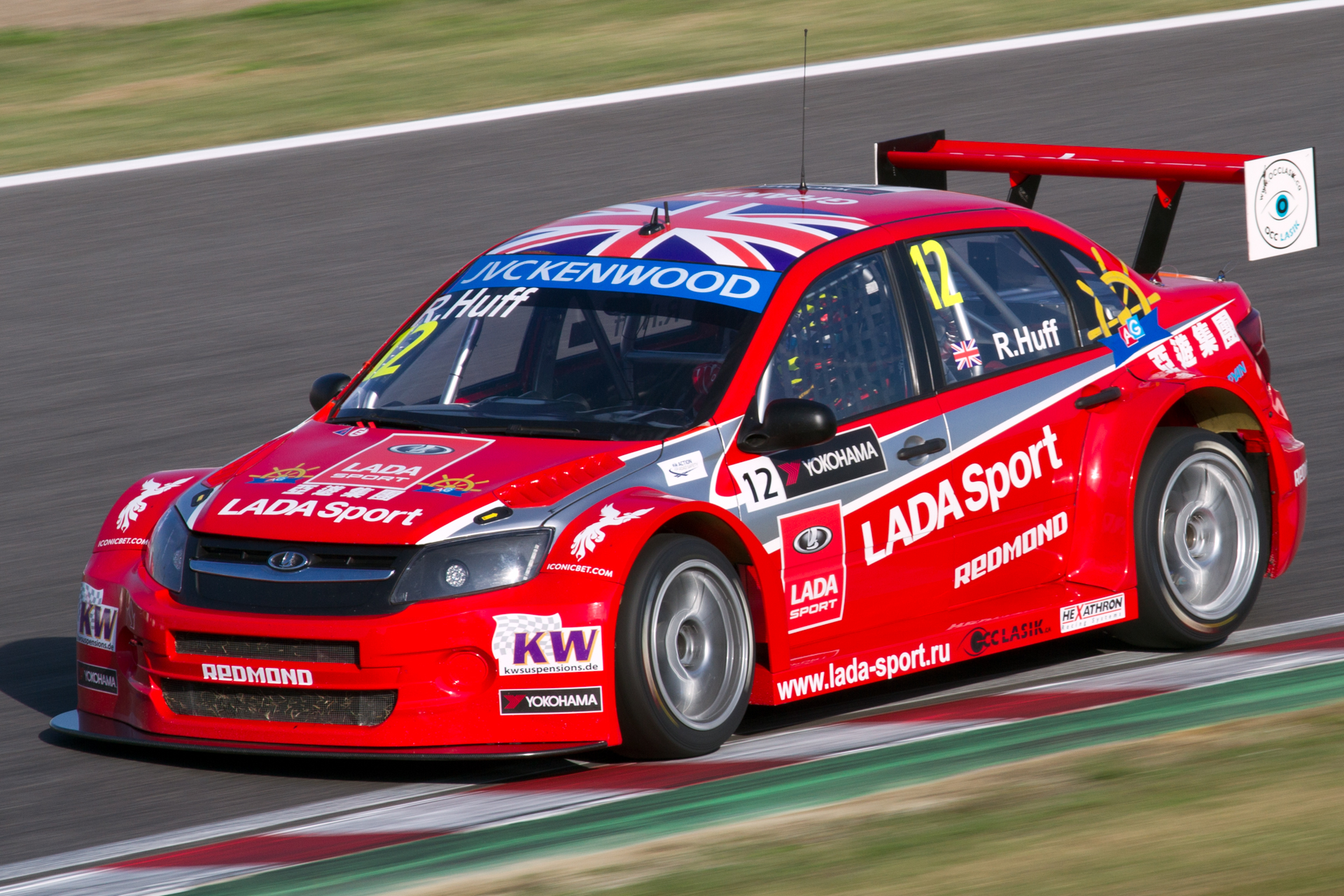
Huff competing in the 2014 World Touring Car Championship

==== Lada Sport (2014–2015) ====
At the 2013 FIA WTCC Race of China, it was announced Huff would join Lada Sport for the 2014 World Touring Car Championship season, having signed a two–year deal with the team.

Huff was the driver who did not drive the dominating Citroën C-Elysée and who won the most numerous races in 2014 : two races, thanks to the inverted grid departure for the race 2 and a 60 kg lower compensation weight. In spite of these advantages, he proved thus his level of driving performances.

Lada introduced a new car for the 2015 WTCC season : the Lada Vesta, developed mainly by the French company Oreca.

== Racing record ==
=== Complete British Touring Car Championship results ===
(key) (Races in bold indicate pole position – 1 point awarded in first race) (Races in italics indicate fastest lap – 1 point awarded all races) (* signifies that driver lead race for at least one lap – 1 point given all races)

Year	Team	Car	1	2	3	4	5	6	7	8	9	10	11	12	13	14	15	16	17	18	19	20	21	22	23	24	25	26	27	28	29	30	Pos	Points
2004	SEAT Sport UK	SEAT Toledo Cupra	THR; 1; 6	THR; 2 Ret	THR; 3 Ret	BRH; 1; 2*	BRH; 2; 11	BRH; 3; 4	SIL; 1; 10	**SIL**; **2**; 7*	SIL; 3; 3	OUL; 1; 7	OUL; 2 Ret	OUL; 3 Ret	MON; 1; 8	MON; 2 DSQ	MON; 3 Ret	CRO; 1; 5	CRO; 2; 2	CRO; 3; 2*	KNO; 1 Ret	KNO; 2; 6	KNO; 3; 5	BRH; 1; 7	BRH; 2; 3	BRH; 3; 1*	SNE; 1; 12	SNE; 2; 8	SNE; 3; 1*	DON; 1; 10	**DON**; **2**; 11	DON; 3; 5	7th	148
2017	Power Maxed Racing	Vauxhall Astra	BRH; 1	BRH; 2	BRH; 3	DON; 1	DON; 2	DON; 3	THR; 1	THR; 2	THR; 3	OUL; 1	OUL; 2	OUL; 3	CRO; 1	CRO; 2	CRO; 3	SNE; 1	SNE; 2	SNE; 3	KNO; 1	KNO; 2	KNO; 3	ROC; 1	ROC; 2	ROC; 3	SIL; 1; 16	SIL; 2; 8	SIL; 3; 2*	BRH; 1	BRH; 2	BRH; 3	25th	26
2023	Go-Fix with Autoaid Breakdown	Cupra León	DON; 1	DON; 2	DON; 3	BRH; 1	BRH; 2	BRH; 3	SNE; 1	SNE; 2	SNE; 3	THR; 1	THR; 2	THR; 3	OUL; 1	OUL; 2	OUL; 3	CRO; 1	CRO; 2	CRO; 3	KNO; 1; 13	KNO; 2; 14	KNO; 3 Ret	DON; 1	DON; 2	DON; 3	SIL; 1	SIL; 2	SIL; 3	BRH; 1	BRH; 2	BRH; 3	26th	5
2024	Toyota Gazoo Racing UK	Toyota Corolla GR Sport	DON; 1; 18	DON; 2; 9	**DON**; **3**; 6*	BRH; 1; 11	BRH; 2 Ret	BRH; 3; 9	SNE; 1; 9	SNE; 2; 14	SNE; 3; 1*	THR; 1; 12	THR; 2; 10	THR; 3; 9	OUL; 1; 10	OUL; 2; 11	OUL; 3; 12	CRO; 1; 7	CRO; 2; 2*	CRO; 3; 6	KNO; 1; 8	KNO; 2; 12	**KNO**; **3**; 1*	DON; 1; 7	DON; 2; 7	DON; 3; 15	SIL; 1; 17	SIL; 2; 11	SIL; 3; 7	BRH; 1 Ret	BRH; 2; 16	BRH; 3 Ret	9th	195

=== Complete World Touring Car Championship results ===
(key) (Races in bold indicate pole position) (Races in italics indicate fastest lap)

Year	Team	Car	1	2	3	4	5	6	7	8	9	10	11	12	13	14	15	16	17	18	19	20	21	22	23	24	DC	Points
2005	Chevrolet	Chevrolet Lacetti	ITA; 1; 20	ITA; 2 Ret	FRA; 1; 19	FRA; 2; 16	GBR; 1; 16	GBR; 2 Ret	SMR; 1; 20	SMR; 2 Ret	MEX; 1; 6	MEX; 2 Ret	BEL; 1 NC	BEL; 2; 11	GER; 1; 23	GER; 2; 16	TUR; 1; 16	TUR; 2; 13	ESP; 1 Ret	ESP; 2 DNS	MAC; 1 Ret	MAC; 2 Ret					21st	3
2006	Chevrolet	Chevrolet Lacetti	ITA; 1; 19	ITA; 2; 12	FRA; 1; 9	FRA; 2; 9	GBR; 1; 4	GBR; 2 Ret	GER; 1; 12	GER; 2; 9	BRA; 1; 18	BRA; 2; 8	MEX; 1 Ret	MEX; 2 DNS	CZE; 1; 8	**CZE**; **2**; 1	TUR; 1; 15	TUR; 2; 6	ESP; 1 Ret	ESP; 2; 15	MAC; 1; 9	MAC; 2 Ret					16th	20
2007	Chevrolet	Chevrolet Lacetti	BRA; 1; 5	BRA; 2 Ret	NED; 1 Ret	NED; 2; 13	ESP; 1 Ret	ESP; 2; 13	FRA; 1; 4	FRA; 2; 4	CZE; 1; 20	CZE; 2 NC	POR; 1; 2	POR; 2; 11	SWE; 1; 1	SWE; 2; 11	GER; 1; 11	GER; 2; 6	GBR; 1; 6	GBR; 2; 3	ITA; 1; 8	**ITA**; **2**; 4	MAC; 1; 3	MAC; 2 Ret			9th	57
2008	Chevrolet	Chevrolet Lacetti	BRA; 1 Ret	BRA; 2 Ret	MEX; 1; 9	MEX; 2; 9	ESP; 1; 1	ESP; 2; 2	FRA; 1; 4	FRA; 2; 5	CZE; 1; 9	CZE; 2 DSQ	POR; 1; 4	POR; 2; 5	GBR; 1; 21	GBR; 2; 10	**GER**; **1**; 2	GER; 2; 3	EUR; 1; 4	EUR; 2; 3	ITA; 1; 6	ITA; 2; 26†	JPN; 1; 4	JPN; 2; 5	MAC; 1; 5	MAC; 2; 1	3rd	87
2009	Chevrolet	Chevrolet Cruze LT	BRA; 1 Ret	BRA; 2; 13	MEX; 1 NC	MEX; 2; 14	**MAR**; **1**; 1	MAR; 2; 3	FRA; 1; 1	FRA; 2; 3	ESP; 1; 22	ESP; 2; 22	CZE; 1 Ret	CZE; 2; 12	POR; 1; 2	POR; 2; 6	GBR; 1; 2	GBR; 2; 6	GER; 1 Ret	GER; 1; 9	ITA; 1; 3	ITA; 2; 17	JPN; 1; 3	JPN; 2; 6	**MAC**; **1**; 1	MAC; 2; 8	5th	80
2010	Chevrolet	Chevrolet Cruze LT	BRA; 1; 2	BRA; 1; 5	MAR; 1; 2	MAR; 2 Ret	ITA; 1; 3	ITA; 2; 3	BEL; 1; 5	BEL; 1; 2	POR; 1; 18	POR; 1; 15	GBR; 1; 2	GBR; 2; 6	**CZE**; **1**; 1	CZE; 2; 4	GER; 1; 18†	GER; 2; 7	ESP; 1; 3	ESP; 2; 6	JPN; 1; 1	JPN; 2; 3	**MAC**; **1**; 1	MAC; 2; 3			3rd	276
2011	Chevrolet	Chevrolet Cruze 1.6T	**BRA**; **1**; 1	BRA; 2; 4	**BEL**; **1**; 1	BEL; 2; 6	**ITA**; **1**; 1	ITA; 2; 1	HUN; 1; 4	HUN; 2; 2	CZE; 1; 1	CZE; 2; 4	POR; 1; 3	POR; 2; 1	GBR; 1; 2	GBR; 2; 2	GER; 1; 2	GER; 2; 6	ESP; 2; 5	ESP; 2; 2	JPN; 1; 2	JPN; 2; 3	CHN; 1; 3	**CHN**; **2**; 3	**MAC**; **1**; 1	MAC; 2; 1	2nd	430
2012	Chevrolet	Chevrolet Cruze 1.6T	ITA; 1; 2	ITA; 2; 3	ESP; 1; 4	ESP; 2; 6	MAR; 1; 2	MAR; 2; 2	SVK; 1; 17†	SVK; 2; 1	HUN; 1; 2	HUN; 2; 7	**AUT**; **1**; 1	AUT; 2; 2	POR; 1; 3	POR; 2; 4	BRA; 1; 3	BRA; 2; 1	USA; 1; 2	USA; 2; 1	JPN; 1; 3	JPN; 2; 4	CHN; 1; 2	CHN; 2; 1	**MAC**; **1** Ret	MAC; 2; 2	1st	413
2013	ALL-INKL.COM Münnich Motorsport	SEAT León WTCC	ITA; 1; 6	ITA; 2; 10	MAR; 1; 5	MAR; 2 Ret	SVK; 1; 17	SVK; 2; 4	HUN; 1; 4	HUN; 2; 1	AUT; 1; 8	AUT; 2; 9	RUS; 1; 4	RUS; 2; 3	POR; 1; 5	POR; 2; 2	ARG; 1; 8	ARG; 2 Ret	USA; 1; 8	USA; 2; 20†	JPN; 1; 7	JPN; 2; 8	CHN; 1; 6	CHN; 2; 4	MAC; 1; 3	MAC; 2; 1	4th	215
2014	Lada Sport Lukoil	Lada Granta 1.6T	MAR; 1 Ret	MAR; 2 Ret	FRA; 1; 5	FRA; 2; 11	HUN; 1; 11	HUN; 2; 12	SVK; 1; 9	SVK; 2 C	AUT; 1; 12	AUT; 2 Ret	RUS; 1; 10	RUS; 2 Ret	BEL; 1; 16	BEL; 2; 13	ARG; 1; 7	**ARG**; **2**; 2	BEI; 1; 8	**BEI**; **2**; 1	CHN; 1; 15†	CHN; 2 Ret	JPN; 1; 12	JPN; 2; 11	MAC; 1; 9	MAC; 2; 1	10th	93
2015	Lada Sport Rosneft	Lada Vesta WTCC	ARG; 1 Ret	ARG; 2 Ret	MAR; 1; 10	MAR; 2 Ret	HUN; 1; 9	HUN; 2 Ret	GER; 1 Ret	GER; 2; 7	RUS; 1; 4	RUS; 2; 2	SVK; 1; 4	SVK; 2 Ret	FRA; 1 Ret	FRA; 2 DNS	POR; 1; 10	POR; 2; 9	JPN; 1; 8	JPN; 2; 3	CHN; 1 Ret	CHN; 2; 5	THA; 1; 6	THA; 2; 6	QAT; 1; 12	QAT; 2 Ret	10th	103
2016	Castrol Honda World Touring Car Team	Honda Civic WTCC	FRA; 1; 1	FRA; 2; 6	SVK; 1; 3	SVK; 2; 14	HUN; 1; 10	HUN; 2; 6	MAR; 1 DSQ	**MAR**; **2** DSQ	GER; 1; 4	GER; 2; 4	RUS; 1; 7	RUS; 2; 4	POR; 1; 6	POR; 2; 4	ARG; 1; 2	ARG; 2; 3	JPN; 1; 2	JPN; 2; 9	CHN; 1; 9	CHN; 2; 13	QAT; 1; 3	QAT; 2; 8			6th	199
2017	Münnich Motorsport	Citroën C-Elysée WTCC	MAR; 1 Ret	MAR; 2; 9	ITA; 1; 2	ITA; 2; 3	HUN; 1; 3	**HUN**; **2**; 10	GER; 1; 3	GER; 2; 3	POR; 1; 6	POR; 2; 5	ARG; 1; 7	ARG; 2; 9	CHN; 1 Ret	CHN; 2; 12†	JPN; 1; 8	JPN; 2; 11	MAC; 1; 7	**MAC**; **2**; 1	QAT; 1; 7	QAT; 2; 2					7th	215

^{†}Did not finish the race, but was classified as he completed over 90% of the race distance.

=== Complete TCR International Series results ===
(key) (Races in bold indicate pole position) (Races in italics indicate fastest lap)

Year	Team	Car	1	2	3	4	5	6	7	8	9	10	11	12	13	14	15	16	17	18	19	20	21	22	DC	Points
2015	WestCoast Racing	Honda Civic TCR	SEP; 1	SEP; 2	SHA; 1	SHA; 2	VAL; 1	VAL; 2	ALG; 1	ALG; 2	MNZ; 1	MNZ; 2	SAL; 1	SAL; 2	SOC; 1	SOC; 2	RBR; 1	RBR; 2	MRN; 1	MRN; 2	CHA; 1	CHA; 2	**MAC**; **1**; 1	MAC; 2 Ret	14th	30
2017	Leopard Racing Team WRT	Volkswagen Golf GTI TCR	RIM; 1	RIM; 2	BHR; 1	BHR; 2	SPA; 1; 6	SPA; 2; 2	MNZ; 1	MNZ; 2	SAL; 1 Ret	SAL; 2 DNS	HUN; 1 Ret	HUN; 2; 11	OSC; 1; 3	OSC; 2 Ret	CHA; 1; 5	CHA; 2; 8	**ZHE**; **1**; 3	ZHE; 2; 1	DUB; 1	DUB; 2			9th	106

=== Complete World Touring Car Cup results ===
(key) (Races in bold indicate pole position) (Races in italics indicate fastest lap)

Year	Team	Car	1	2	3	4	5	6	7	8	9	10	11	12	13	14	15	16	17	18	19	20	21	22	23	24	25	26	27	28	29	30	DC	Points
2018	Sébastien Loeb Racing	Volkswagen Golf GTI TCR	MAR; 1; 3	MAR; 2; 18	MAR; 3; 7	HUN; 1; 5	HUN; 2; 1	HUN; 3; 8	GER; 1; 3	GER; 2 Ret	GER; 3 Ret	**NED**; **1**; 3	NED; 2; 8	NED; 3; 2	**POR**; **1** Ret	POR; 2 DNS	POR; 3 DNS	SVK; 1; 19	SVK; 2 Ret	SVK; 3; 13	CHN; 1; 6	CHN; 2; 5	CHN; 3; 6	WUH; 1; 14	WUH; 2; 10	WUH; 3 Ret	JPN; 1; 23†	JPN; 2; 1	JPN; 3; 6	**MAC**; **1**; 3	MAC; 2; 24	**MAC**; **3**; 2	8th	242
2019	SLR VW Motorsport	Volkswagen Golf GTI TCR	MAR; 1; 12	MAR; 2; 22	MAR; 3; 15	HUN; 1; 14	HUN; 2; 7	HUN; 3; 7	SVK; 1; 13	SVK; 2; 5	SVK; 3; 13	NED; 1 Ret	NED; 2; 11	NED; 3; 10	GER; 1; 4	GER; 2 Ret	GER; 3 DNS	POR; 1; 4	POR; 2; 7	POR; 3; 5	CHN; 1; 10	CHN; 2; 7	CHN; 3 Ret	JPN; 1; 10	JPN; 2; 2	JPN; 3; 7	MAC; 1; 4	MAC; 2; 14	**MAC**; **3**; 2	MAL; 1; 23	MAL; 2; 9	MAL; 3; 9	11th	211
2021	Zengő Motorsport	CUPRA León Competición TCR	GER; 1 Ret	GER; 2 Ret	POR; 1; 9	POR; 2; 10	ESP; 1 Ret	ESP; 2; 9	HUN; 1 Ret	**HUN**; **2**; 18	CZE; 1; 8	CZE; 2 Ret	FRA; 1 NC	FRA; 2; 15	ITA; 1; 13	ITA; 2; 9	RUS; 1 Ret	RUS; 2; 1															18th	73
2022	Zengő Motorsport	CUPRA León Competición TCR	FRA; 1; 12	FRA; 2; 8	GER; 1 C	GER; 2 C	HUN; 1; 6	HUN; 2; 2	ESP; 1; 2	ESP; 2; 2	POR; 1; 6	POR; 2; 1	ITA; 1; 8	ITA; 2; 6	ALS; 1; 5	ALS; 2; 1	BHR; 1	BHR; 2	SAU; 1; 9	SAU; 2; 5													6th	210

^{†} Driver did not finish the race, but was classified as he completed over 90% of the race distance.

=== Complete STCC TCR Scandinavia Touring Car Championship results ===
(key) (Races in bold indicate pole position) (Races in italics indicate fastest lap)

Year	Team	Car	1	2	3	4	5	6	7	8	9	10	11	12	DC	Points
2020	Lestrup Racing	Volkswagen Golf GTI TCR	KAR; 1; 4	KAR; 2; 2	KAR; 3; 3	SKE; 1; 2	SKE; 2; 3	SKE; 3; 8	MAN; 1; 2	MAN; 2; 2	MAN; 3; 4	KNU; 1; 1	KNU; 2; 2	KNU; 3; 1	1st	209

=== Complete TCR China Touring Car Championship results ===
(key) (Races in bold indicate pole position) (Races in italics indicate fastest lap)

Year	Team	Car	1	2	3	4	5	6	7	8	9	10	11	12	DC	Points
2020	Team MG XPower	MG 6 X-Power TCR	ZHU1; 1	ZHU1; 2	ZHU2; 1	ZHU2; 2	SHA; 1	SHA; 2	JIA1; 1	JIA1; 2	JIA2; 1	JIA2; 2	**MAC**; **1**; 1	MAC; 2; 23	13th	20

=== Complete TCR World Tour results ===
(key) (Races in bold indicate pole position) (Races in italics indicate fastest lap)

Year	Team	Car	1	2	3	4	5	6	7	8	9	10	11	12	13	14	15	16	17	18	19	20	DC	Points
2023	Audi Sport Team Comtoyou	Audi RS 3 LMS TCR	ALG; 1; 3	ALG; 2; 6	SPA; 1; 5	SPA; 2; 10	VAL; 1; 4	VAL; 2; 1	HUN; 1; 9	HUN; 2; 2	ELP; 1; 7	ELP; 2; 4	VIL; 1; 3	VIL; 2; 3	SYD; 1; 4	SYD; 2; 2	SYD; 3; 1	BAT; 1; 6	BAT; 2; 4	BAT; 3; 3	MAC; 1; 3	MAC; 2; 12	3rd	414
2024	Volcano Motorsport	Audi RS 3 LMS TCR (2021)	VAL; 1	VAL; 2	MRK; 1	MRK; 2	MOH; 1	MOH; 2	SAP; 1	SAP; 2	ELP; 1	ELP; 2	ZHZ; 1; 9	ZHZ; 2; 7	MAC; 1; 6	MAC; 2 Ret							12th	40

=== Complete TCR Europe Touring Car Series results ===
(key) (Races in bold indicate pole position) (Races in italics indicate fastest lap)

Year	Team	Car	1	2	3	4	5	6	7	8	9	10	11	12	13	14	DC	Points
2023	Audi Sport Team Comtoyou	Audi RS 3 LMS TCR	ALG; 1; 3	ALG; 2; 6	PAU; 1	PAU; 2	SPA; 1; 5	SPA; 2; 10	HUN; 1; 9	HUN; 2; 2	LEC; 1	LEC; 2	MNZ; 1	MNZ; 2	CAT; 1	CAT; 2	NC‡	0‡

^{‡} Driver was a World Tour full-time entry and was ineligible for points.

=== Britcar 24 Hour results ===
Year	Team	Co-Drivers	Car	Car No.	Class	Laps	Pos.	Class Pos.
2007	(United Kingdom) KTF Group	(United Kingdom) Phil Bennett (United Kingdom) Mark Dwyer (United Kingdom) Ken Finneran	Chrysler Viper GTS-R	6	GT3	142	DNF	DNF
2010	(United Kingdom) Wessex Vehicles	(United Kingdom) Phil Bennett (United Kingdom) Kelvin Burt (United Kingdom) Nigel Mustill	Aquila CR1	3	1	178	DNF	DNF

Sporting positions
Preceded by Inaugural	SEAT Cupra Championship; Champion; 2003	Succeeded by James Pickford
Preceded by Yvan Muller	World Touring Car Championship; Champion; 2012	Succeeded by Yvan Muller
Preceded by Robert Dahlgren	STCC TCR Scandinavia Touring Car Championship; Champion; 2020	Succeeded by Robert Dahlgren
Preceded by Gilles Magnus	WTCR Trophy; Champion; 2022	Succeeded by None (Series ended)
