= 2011 FIA WTCC Race of Germany =

Race details
- Round 8 of 12 in the 2011 World Touring Car Championship at Motorsport Arena Oschersleben in Oschersleben, Germany.
- Date: 31 July, 2011
- Location: Oschersleben, Germany
- Course: Motorsport Arena Oschersleben; 3.696 kilometres (2.297 mi)

Race One
- Laps: 14
Pole position
Driver		(France) Yvan Muller	Chevrolet RML
Time		1:33.712	
Podium
First		(France) Yvan Muller	Chevrolet RML
Second		(United Kingdom) Robert Huff	Chevrolet RML
Third		(Italy) Gabriele Tarquini	Lukoil-SUNRED
Fastest Lap
Driver		(United Kingdom) Robert Huff	Chevrolet RML
Time		1:49.734	

Race Two
- Laps: 15
Podium
First		(Germany) Franz Engstler	Liqui Moly Team Engstler
Second		(Switzerland) Alain Menu	Chevrolet RML
Third		(Italy) Gabriele Tarquini	Lukoil-SUNRED
Fastest Lap
Driver		(Netherlands) Tom Coronel	ROAL Motorsport
Time		1:36.185	

The 2011 FIA WTCC Race of Germany was the eighth round of the 2011 World Touring Car Championship season and the seventh running of the FIA WTCC Race of Germany. It was held on 31 July 2011 at the Motorsport Arena Oschersleben in Oschersleben, Germany.

The first race was won by Yvan Muller of Chevrolet RML and the second race was won by Franz Engstler of Liqui Moly Team Engstler who took his and the team's first victory in the World Touring Car Championship.

== Background ==
After the previous round, Robert Huff was leading the world drivers' championship. Norbert Michelisz was leading the Yokohama drivers' trophy by two points over Kristian Poulsen.

Ibrahim Okyay and Borusan Otomotiv Motorsport returned to the championship having last competed in the Race of Italy. Stefano D'Aste returned to Wiechers-Sport having been forced to miss the Race of UK due to commitments in the GT4 European Cup.

Poulsen would get a five–place grid penalty for race one after he was deemed responsible for the collision with Michelisz at Donington Park. Muller would be driving under a two race three–place suspended grid penalty after a controversial pass on Huff at the previous round.

== Report ==
=== Free practice ===
Muller led the first practice session which took place in wet conditions. Alain Menu was second and Gabriele Tarquini was third, championship leader Huff was fourth. Aleksei Dudukalo ended his session on his first lap when the front splitter on his SUNRED León broke and he beached it in the gravel. Yukinori Taniguchi also went through the gravel but was able to return to the track after assistance from the marshals. He returned to the pits but was black flagged when he left the pits again after repairs. The session was stopped just over halfway through when Fabio Fabiani spun and put his Proteam Racing BMW 320si into the tyre wall at the first corner.

Huff topped the second practice session with Muller second fastest and Robert Dahlgren in the Volvo C30 third.

=== Qualifying ===
Muller secured pole position for race one with Dahlgren joining him on the front row. Dahlgren was quickest in Q1, while Engstler set his best time late on to end up tenth and get through to the second session, also securing him the pole position for race two.

When the top ten shootout began, Dahlgren looked to be on pole for a while before Muller set his best time. Huff lined up on the second row alongside Tarquini while Tom Coronel shared the third row with Menu. Michelisz was the leading independent driver in seventh. Race two pole sitter would start ninth for race one.

=== Warm-Up ===
Huff led a Chevrolet 1–2 in the wet warm–up session on Sunday morning, pole sitter Muller was second while Polestar Racing's Dahlgren was third.

=== Race One ===
The weather hadn't improved much since the warm–up session and the first race took place in wet conditions. The race was started at the third attempt of the rolling start as the cars failed line up through the grid slots correctly. Muller led away from the start as Dahlgren dropped down to fifth before turn one, dropped down even further when he collided with Menu's Chevrolet. Huff was now in second and stayed close to Muller for the first few laps until he lost ground on lap four having run wide. Huff narrowly stayed ahead of Tarquini and began closing in on teammate Muller but was unable to pass on the final lap. Dudukalo and Engstler meanwhile made contact, the BMW driver spinning and dropping down the order as a result. Muller won the race with Huff second and Tarquini a distant third. Dahlgren recovered to fourth with Menu fifth and Yokohama Trophy winner D'Aste sixth. Michel Nykjær, Pepe Oriola, Dudukalo and Coronel completed the top ten.

=== Race Two ===
Engstler started from pole position but lost his position at the start to Michelisz while Mehdi Bennani and Poulsen collided further back, their cars crashing into the pit wall. The safety car was brought out while the debris was cleared from the track, Michelisz kept his lead the restart. He spun out of the lead on lap four and dropped to fourth, handing the lead of the race back to Engstler. Muller was making his way up from ninth on the grid and was running fourth at one point. Coronel and Michelisz clashed with the Zengő-Dension Team driver ending his race in the tyre wall at the first corner. Muller then got sideways and this allowed Coronel to re–pass the Chevrolet. Engstler took the win and ended eleven consecutive wins for Chevrolet with Menu second having been close behind since the restart. Tarquini was third, Coronel fourth and Muller fifth. Huff saw his championship reduced further by finishing behind Muller in sixth.

== Results ==
=== Qualifying ===
Pos.	No.	Name	Team	Car	C	Q1	Q2
1	1	(France) Yvan Muller	Chevrolet RML	Chevrolet Cruze 1.6T		1:35.075	1:33.712
2	30	(Sweden) Robert Dahlgren	Polestar Racing	Volvo C30 Drive		1:34.886	1:34.215
3	2	(United Kingdom) Robert Huff	Chevrolet RML	Chevrolet Cruze 1.6T		1:35.417	1:34.290
4	3	(Italy) Gabriele Tarquini	Lukoil-SUNRED	SUNRED SR León 1.6T		1:35.424	1:34.519
5	15	(Netherlands) Tom Coronel	ROAL Motorsport	BMW 320 TC		1:35.281	1:34.635
6	8	(Switzerland) Alain Menu	Chevrolet RML	Chevrolet Cruze 1.6T		1:35.459	1:34.673
7	5	(Hungary) Norbert Michelisz	Zengő-Dension Team	BMW 320 TC	Y	1:35.556	1:34.884
8	17	(Denmark) Michel Nykjær	SUNRED Engineering	SUNRED SR León 1.6T	Y	1:35.522	1:35.260
9	12	(Germany) **Franz Engstler**	Liqui Moly Team Engstler	BMW 320 TC	Y	1:35.621	1:35.370
10	18	(Portugal) Tiago Monteiro	SUNRED Engineering	SUNRED SR León 1.6T		1:35.610	1:35.501
11	9	(Hong Kong) Darryl O'Young	bamboo-engineering	Chevrolet Cruze 1.6T	Y	1:35.633	
12	26	(Italy) Stefano D'Aste	Wiechers-Sport	BMW 320 TC	Y	1:35.656	
13	25	(Morocco) Mehdi Bennani	Proteam Racing	BMW 320 TC	Y	1:35.724	
14	11	(Denmark) Kristian Poulsen	Liqui Moly Team Engstler	BMW 320 TC	Y	1:35.730	
15	74	(Spain) Pepe Oriola	SUNRED Engineering	SUNRED SR León 1.6T	Y	1:35.903	
16	7	(Switzerland) Fredy Barth	SEAT Swiss Racing by SUNRED	SUNRED SR León 1.6T	Y	1:35.932	
17	20	(Spain) Javier Villa	Proteam Racing	BMW 320 TC	Y	1:36.071	
18	10	(Japan) Yukinori Taniguchi	bamboo-engineering	Chevrolet Cruze 1.6T	Y	1:36.657	
19	4	(Russia) Aleksei Dudukalo	Lukoil-SUNRED	SUNRED SR León 1.6T	Y	1:36.666	
20	13	(Turkey) Ibrahim Okyay	Borusan Otomotiv Motorsport	BMW 320si	Y	1:38.113	
107% time: 1:41.528
–	21	(Italy) Fabio Fabiani	Proteam Racing	BMW 320si	Y	1:41.754	

- **Bold** denotes Pole position for second race.

=== Race 1 ===
Pos.	No.	Name	Team	Car	C	Laps	Time/Retired	Grid	Points
1	1	(France) Yvan Muller	Chevrolet RML	Chevrolet Cruze 1.6T		14	25:54.624	1	25
2	2	(United Kingdom) **Robert Huff**	Chevrolet RML	Chevrolet Cruze 1.6T		14	+0.289	3	18
3	3	(Italy) Gabriele Tarquini	Lukoil-SUNRED	SUNRED SR León 1.6T		14	+13.810	4	15
4	30	(Sweden) Robert Dahlgren	Polestar Racing	Volvo C30 Drive		14	+14.665	2	12
5	8	(Switzerland) Alain Menu	Chevrolet RML	Chevrolet Cruze 1.6T		14	+18.578	6	10
6	26	(Italy) Stefano D'Aste	Wiechers-Sport	BMW 320 TC	Y	14	+25.058	12	8
7	17	(Denmark) Michel Nykjær	SUNRED Engineering	SUNRED SR León 1.6T	Y	14	+33.795	8	6
8	74	(Spain) Pepe Oriola	SUNRED Engineering	SUNRED SR León 1.6T	Y	14	+34.362	14	4
9	4	(Russia) Aleksei Dudukalo	Lukoil-SUNRED	SUNRED SR León 1.6T	Y	14	+43.187	18	2
10	15	(Netherlands) Tom Coronel	ROAL Motorsport	BMW 320 TC		14	+45.665	5	1
11	25	(Morocco) Mehdi Bennani	Proteam Racing	BMW 320 TC	Y	14	+46.105	13	
12	20	(Spain) Javier Villa	Proteam Racing	BMW 320 TC	Y	14	+46.328	16	
13	11	(Denmark) Kristian Poulsen	Liqui Moly Team Engstler	BMW 320 TC	Y	14	+46.627	19	
14	9	(Hong Kong) Darryl O'Young	bamboo-engineering	Chevrolet Cruze 1.6T	Y	14	+46.919	11	
15	5	(Hungary) Norbert Michelisz	Zengő-Dension Team	BMW 320 TC	Y	14	+47.560	7	
16	12	(Germany) Franz Engstler	Liqui Moly Team Engstler	BMW 320 TC	Y	14	+55.237	9	
17	10	(Japan) Yukinori Taniguchi	bamboo-engineering	Chevrolet Cruze 1.6T	Y	14	+1:29.885	17	
18	13	(Turkey) Ibrahim Okyay	Borusan Otomotiv Motorsport	BMW 320si	Y	14	+1:52.554	20	
19	21	(Italy) Fabio Fabiani	Proteam Racing	BMW 320si	Y	13	+1 Lap	21	
Ret	18	(Portugal) Tiago Monteiro	SUNRED Engineering	SUNRED SR León 1.6T		7	Puncture	10	
Ret	7	(Switzerland) Fredy Barth	SEAT Swiss Racing by SUNRED	SUNRED SR León 1.6T	Y	5	Alternator	15	

- **Bold** denotes Fastest lap.

=== Race 2 ===
Pos.	No.	Name	Team	Car	C	Laps	Time/Retired	Grid	Points
1	12	(Germany) Franz Engstler	Liqui Moly Team Engstler	BMW 320 TC	Y	15	25:05.708	1	25
2	8	(Switzerland) Alain Menu	Chevrolet RML	Chevrolet Cruze 1.6T		15	+0.750	5	18
3	3	(Italy) Gabriele Tarquini	Lukoil-SUNRED	SUNRED SR León 1.6T		15	+2.361	6	15
4	15	(Netherlands) **Tom Coronel**	ROAL Motorsport	BMW 320 TC		15	+2.392	8	12
5	1	(France) Yvan Muller	Chevrolet RML	Chevrolet Cruze 1.6T		15	+3.117	9	10
6	2	(United Kingdom) Robert Huff	Chevrolet RML	Chevrolet Cruze 1.6T		15	+3.816	7	8
7	30	(Sweden) Robert Dahlgren	Polestar Racing	Volvo C30 Drive		15	+4.310	10	6
8	18	(Portugal) Tiago Monteiro	SUNRED Engineering	SUNRED SR León 1.6T		15	+8.762	2	4
9	26	(Italy) Stefano D'Aste	Wiechers-Sport	BMW 320 TC	Y	15	+9.286	12	2
10	20	(Spain) Javier Villa	Proteam Racing	BMW 320 TC	Y	15	+12.352	17	1
11	9	(Hong Kong) Darryl O'Young	bamboo-engineering	Chevrolet Cruze 1.6T	Y	15	+15.585	11	
12	74	(Spain) Pepe Oriola	SUNRED Engineering	SUNRED SR León 1.6T	Y	15	+17.167	15	
13	13	(Turkey) Ibrahim Okyay	Borusan Otomotiv Motorsport	BMW 320si	Y	15	+44.757	20	
14	10	(Japan) Yukinori Taniguchi	bamboo-engineering	Chevrolet Cruze 1.6T	Y	15	+47.098	18	
15	4	(Russia) Aleksei Dudukalo	Lukoil-SUNRED	SUNRED SR León 1.6T	Y	15	+1:04.582	19	
16	21	(Italy) Fabio Fabiani	Proteam Racing	BMW 320si	Y	15	+1:30.934	21	
17	17	(Denmark) Michel Nykjær	SUNRED Engineering	SUNRED SR León 1.6T	Y	11	+4 Laps	4	
Ret	5	(Hungary) Norbert Michelisz	Zengő-Dension Team	BMW 320 TC	Y	10	Race incident	3	
Ret	7	(Switzerland) Fredy Barth	SEAT Swiss Racing by SUNRED	SUNRED SR León 1.6T	Y	7	Race incident	16	
Ret	25	(Morocco) Mehdi Bennani	Proteam Racing	BMW 320 TC	Y	0	Race incident	13	
Ret	11	(Denmark) Kristian Poulsen	Liqui Moly Team Engstler	BMW 320 TC	Y	0	Race incident	14	

- **Bold** denotes Fastest lap.

== Standings after the event ==
Drivers' Championship standings

	Pos	Driver	Points
	1	(United Kingdom) Robert Huff	289
	2	(France) Yvan Muller	283
	3	(Switzerland) Alain Menu	220
1	4	(Italy) Gabriele Tarquini	145
1	5	(Netherlands) Tom Coronel	137

Yokohama Independents' Trophy standings

Pos	Driver	Points
1	(Hungary) Norbert Michelisz	79
2	(Denmark) Kristian Poulsen	78
3	(Hong Kong) Darryl O'Young	78
4	(Germany) Franz Engstler	77
5	(Spain) Javier Villa	73

Manufacturers' Championship standings

Pos	Manufacturer	Points
1	(United States) Chevrolet	648
2	(Germany) BMW Customer Racing Teams	381
3	(Spain) SR Customer Racing	357
4	(Sweden) Volvo Polestar Evaluation Team	112

- Note: Only the top five positions are included for both sets of drivers' standings.
