= Franz Engstler =

German racing driver (born 1961)

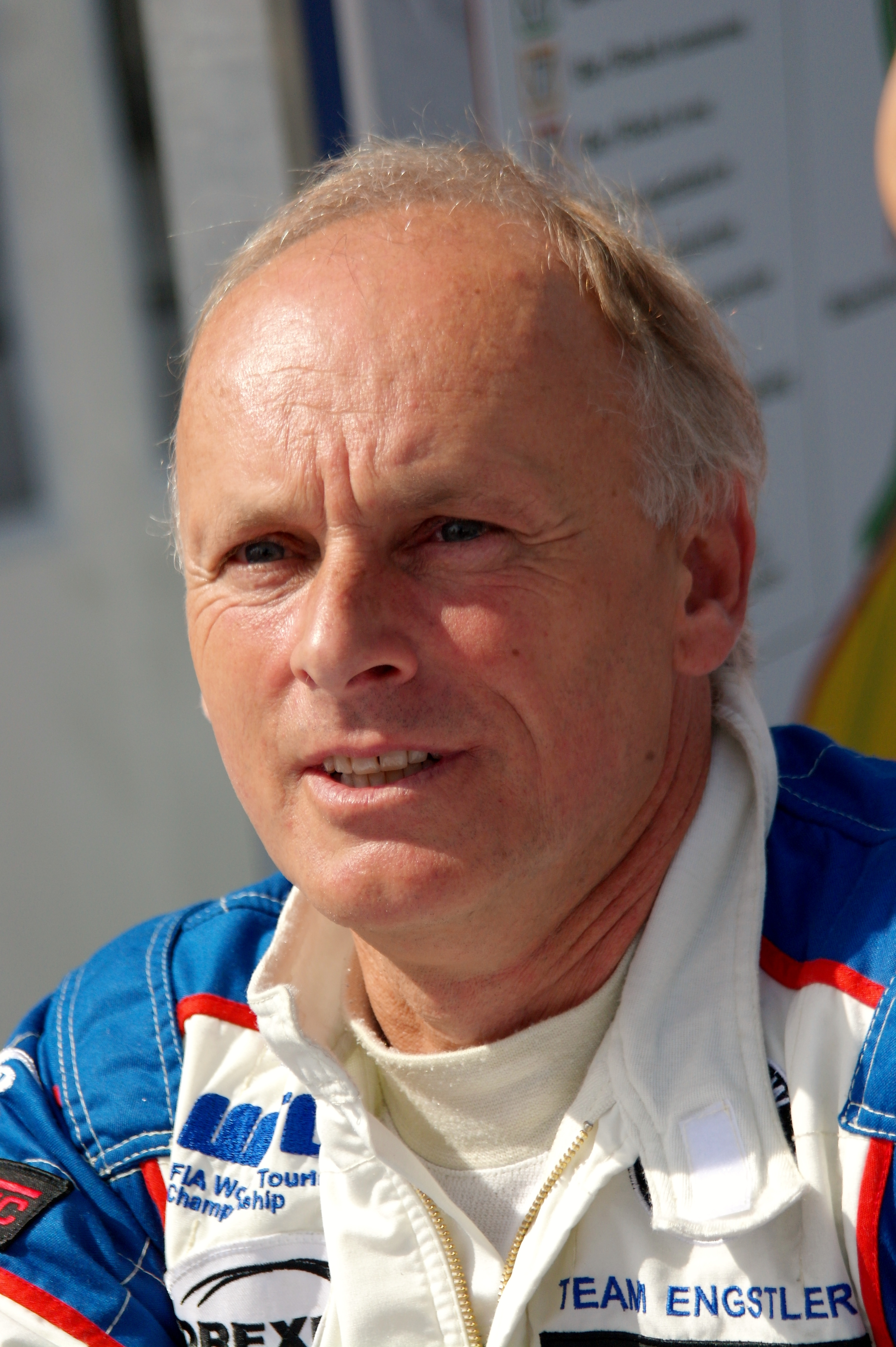
- Engstler at the 2014 FIA WTCC Race of Belgium.
- Nationality: German
- Born: 25 July 1961 (age 65) Kempten im Allgäu, Germany
- Relatives: Luca Engstler (son)

World Touring Car Championship career
- Debut season: 2007
- Current team: Engstler Motorsport
- Categorisation: FIA Gold (until 2011); FIA Silver (2012–2014); FIA Bronze (2018–)
- Car number: 6
- Starts: 164
- Wins: 1
- Poles: 0
- Fastest laps: 0
- Best finish: 8th in 2011

Previous series
- 2006–08 2006 2005, 2008 2005–07 2004 2002 2002 2001 2000–03 1996, 2005 1994, 1996–99 1989–1994 1988–90: ADAC Procar; Russian Touring Car Championship; ETCC; Asian Touring Car Series; Produktionswagen Meisterschaft; Dutch Touring Car Championship; V8 Star; European Superproduction; German Touring Car Challenge; Italian Super Touring; German Supertouring; DTM; German F3 Championship

Championship titles
- 2022 2007 2005–06 2000: Ferrari Challenge Europe Coppa Shell Pro-Am; ADAC Procar Division I ATCS; German Touring Car Challenge

Franz Engstler (born 25 July 1961) is a German auto racing driver.

== Racing career ==
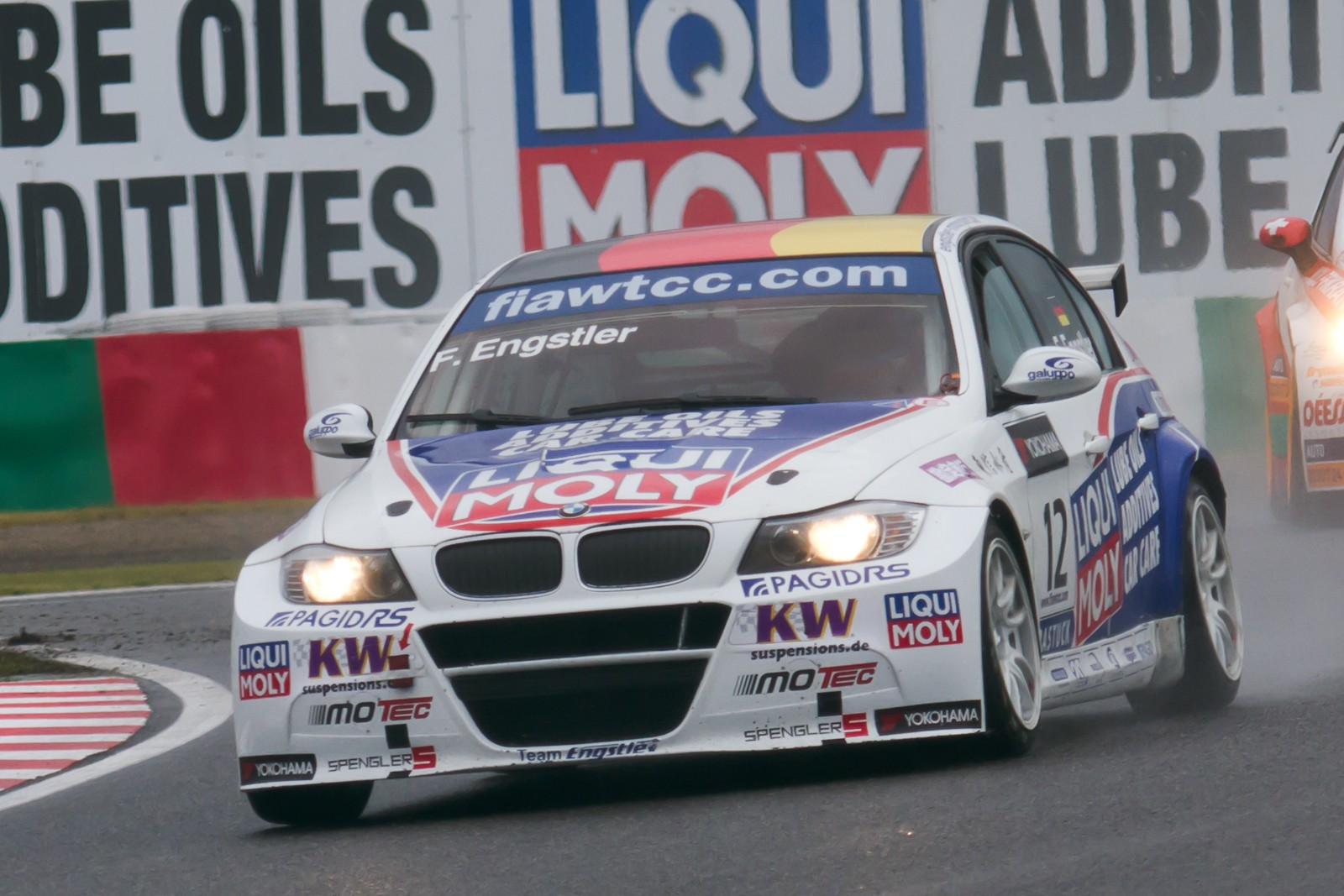
Engstler at Suzuka in the 2011 WTCC

Born in Kempten im Allgäu, Engstler started racing in the European Hillclimbing Championship and the German Long Distance Cup, which he won. From 1988, he competed in German Formula Three, winning the class B title in 1989. In 1993, he switched to Touring car racing, where he was German Touring Car Championship Class 2 champion in an Alfa Romeo 155. Between 1994 and 1999, he raced in the German Super Touring Championship for various teams. He finished first in the 2000 German Touring Car Challenge, with two wins. Two more seasons were spent racing in this series in 2002 and 2003. After a season in the 2004 German Production Car Championship, he moved to the Asian Touring Car Championship. He dominated the championship, which bought him back to back titles in 2005 and 2006. Another title came in 2007, winning the German ADAC Procar Series for the second year.

2008 first saw Engstler enter the WTCC. A solid first season saw him finish second in the independents Trophy. The highlight of the year was sixth place overall finish in the final race in Macau.

Before the end of the 2008 season, Engstler won the BMW Sports Trophy for independent drivers, ahead of one hundred and forty other BMW drivers around the world.

Engstler was involved in a bizarre incident at the 2009 WTCC meeting at Pau. Having finished sixth in race one, he started race two from second position. He took the lead from Alain Menu at the start and led the first lap. The safety car was deployed following three separate incidents on the first lap. The safety car jinked left right into the middle of the circuit, and with the nature of the circuit, Engstler was unsighted as he slammed into the safety car causing substantial damage to both cars, ending his race.

== Racing record ==
=== Complete Deutsche Tourenwagen Meisterschaft results ===
(key) (Races in bold indicate pole position) (Races in italics indicate fastest lap)

Year	Team	Car	1	2	3	4	5	6	7	8	9	10	11	12	13	14	15	16	17	18	19	20	21	22	23	24	Pos.	Pts
1989	BMW M Team Linder	BMW M3 Evo	ZOL; 1	ZOL; 2	HOC; 1	HOC; 2	NÜR; 1	NÜR; 2	MFA; 1	MFA; 2	AVU; 1	AVU; 2	NÜR; 1	NÜR; 2	NOR; 1	NOR; 2	HOC; 1	HOC; 2	DIE; 1	DIE; 2	NÜR; 1	NÜR; 2	HOC; 1; 21	HOC; 2 Ret			NC	0
1990	BMW M Team Linder	BMW M3 Sport Evolution	ZOL; 1	ZOL; 2	HOC; 1	HOC; 2	NÜR; 1	NÜR; 2	AVU; 1	AVU; 1	MFA; 1	MFA; 2	WUN; 1	WUN; 2	NÜR; 1	NÜR; 2	NOR; 1	NOR; 2	DIE; 1	DIE; 2	NÜR; 1; 14	NÜR; 2 Ret	HOC; 1	HOC; 2			NC	0
1991	Opel Team Irmscher	Opel Omega 3000 Evo 500	ZOL; 1 Ret	ZOL; 2; 16	HOC; 1; 29	HOC; 2 Ret	NÜR; 1; 21	NÜR; 2; 18	AVU; 1 Ret	AVU; 2 DNS	WUN; 1; 15	WUN; 2 Ret	NOR; 1 DNQ	NOR; 2 DNQ	DIE; 1	DIE; 2	NÜR; 1; 17	NÜR; 2 Ret	ALE; 1 Ret	ALE; 2 Ret	HOC; 1 Ret	HOC; 2; 20	BRN; 1; 24	BRN; 2; 14	DON; 1 Ret	DON; 2; 18	35th	0
1992	Valier Motorsport	BMW M3 Sport Evolution	ZOL; 1; 17	ZOL; 2; 8	NÜR; 1; 15	NÜR; 2 Ret	WUN; 1; 14	WUN; 2; 10	AVU; 1 Ret	AVU; 2; 10	HOC; 1 Ret	HOC; 2 Ret	NÜR; 1; 22	NÜR; 2 Ret	NOR; 1; 13	NOR; 2 Ret	BRN; 1; 6	BRN; 2; 8	DIE; 1; 13	DIE; 2; 12	ALE; 1; 9	ALE; 2 Ret	NÜR; 1; 15	NÜR; 2; 11	HOC; 1; 11	HOC; 2; 4	16th	26
1993	Engstler Motorsport	Alfa Romeo 155 TS	ZOL; 1	ZOL; 2	HOC; 1	HOC; 2	NÜR; 1	NÜR; 2	WUN; 1	WUN; 2	NÜR; 1; 21	NÜR; 2; 20	NOR; 1 DNQ	NOR; 2; 18	DON; 1; 20	DON; 2; 20	DIE; 1 Ret	DIE; 2; 17	ALE; 1; 18	ALE; 2; 16	AVU; 1; 19	AVU; 2; 19	HOC; 1; 19	HOC; 2; 17			39th	0
1994	Engstler Motorsport	Alfa Romeo 155 V6 Ti	ZOL; 1 Ret	ZOL; 2; 12	HOC; 1; 11	HOC; 2 Ret	NÜR; 1 Ret	NÜR; 2; 12	MUG; 1; 11	MUG; 2; 6	NÜR; 1 DNS	NÜR; 2 DNS	NOR; 1; 10	NOR; 2 Ret	DON; 1	DON; 2	DIE; 1	DIE; 2	NÜR; 1	NÜR; 2	AVU; 1	AVU; 2	ALE; 1	ALE; 2	HOC; 1	HOC; 2	20th	1

=== Complete Super Tourenwagen Cup results ===
(key) (Races in bold indicate pole position) (Races in italics indicate fastest lap)

Year	Team	Car	1	2	3	4	5	6	7	8	9	10	11	12	13	14	15	16	17	18	19	20	Pos.	Pts
1994	BMW Team Schneider	BMW 318i	AVU	WUN	ZOL	ZAN	ÖST	SAL	SPA	NÜR; 12													25th	0
1996	Alfa Team Engstler	Alfa Romeo 155	ZOL; 1; 14	ZOL; 2 Ret	ASS; 1; 16	ASS; 2; 13	HOC; 1; 21	HOC; 2 Ret	SAC; 1; 11	SAC; 2; 15	WUN; 1; 17	WUN; 2; 16	ZWE; 1; 16	ZWE; 2; 10	SAL; 1; 15	SAL; 2 DNS	AVU; 1; 13	AVU; 2; 14	NÜR; 1; 17	NÜR; 2; 15			19th	135
1997	Cool Fire Team Engstler	Alfa Romeo 155 TS	HOC; 1; 21	HOC; 2 Ret	ZOL; 1; 22	ZOL; 2; 17	NÜR; 1; 22	NÜR; 2; 21	SAC; 1; 21	SAC; 2; 15	NOR; 1; 23	NOR; 2; 15	WUN; 1; 19	WUN; 2; 18	ZWE; 1; 20	ZWE; 2; 23	SAL; 1; 21	SAL; 2; 22	REG; 1; 18	REG; 2; 17	NÜR; 1; 20	NÜR; 2; 20	24th	57
1998	Irmscher Motorsport	Opel Vectra	HOC; 1; 14	HOC; 2; 19	NÜR; 1; 18	NÜR; 2; 18	SAC; 1; 10	SAC; 2; 14	NOR; 1; 16	NOR; 2; 15	REG; 1; 17	REG; 2; 14	WUN; 1; 12	WUN; 2; 15	ZWE; 1; 20	ZWE; 2 Ret	SAL; 1; 21	SAL; 2 DNS	OSC; 1; 24	OSC; 2; 19	NÜR; 1; 18	NÜR; 2; 16	21st	119
1999	ER Motorsport	Alfa Romeo 155	SAC; 1	SAC; 2	ZWE; 1	ZWE; 2	OSC; 1	OSC; 2	NOR; 1; 14	NOR; 2; 12	MIS; 1; 13	MIS; 2; 13	NÜR; 1; 12	NÜR; 2; 11	SAL; 1 Ret	SAL; 2 Ret	OSC; 1; 12	OSC; 2 Ret	HOC; 1; 19	HOC; 2 DNS	NÜR; 1; 19	NÜR; 2; 15	20th	103

=== Complete European Super Production Championship results ===
(key) (Races in bold indicate pole position) (Races in italics indicate fastest lap)

Year	Team	Car	1	2	3	4	5	6	7	8	9	10	DC	Pts
2001	Engstler Centro Sportivo	Alfa Romeo 147	MNZ	BRN	MAG	SIL	ZOL	HUN	A1R	NÜR; Ret	JAR	EST	NC	0

=== Complete European Touring Car Championship results ===
(key) (Races in bold indicate pole position) (Races in italics indicate fastest lap)

Year	Team	Car	1	2	3	4	5	6	7	8	9	10	11	12	13	14	15	16	17	18	19	20	DC	Pts
2004	Engstler Motorsport	BMW 320i	MNZ; 1	MNZ; 2	VAL; 1	VAL; 2	MAG; 1	MAG; 2	HOC; 1	HOC; 2	BRN; 1	BRN; 2	DON; 1	DON; 2	SPA; 1; 21	SPA; 2 Ret	IMO; 1	IMO; 2	OSC; 1; 13	OSC; 2; 19	DUB; 1	DUB; 2	NC	0

=== Complete World Touring Car Championship results ===
(key) (Races in bold indicate pole position) (Races in italics indicate fastest lap)

Year	Team	Car	1	2	3	4	5	6	7	8	9	10	11	12	13	14	15	16	17	18	19	20	21	22	23	24	DC	Pts
2007	Engstler Motorsport	BMW 320i	BRA; 1	BRA; 2	NED; 1	NED; 2	ESP; 1	ESP; 2	FRA; 1	FRA; 2	CZE; 1	CZE; 2	POR; 1	POR; 2	SWE; 1	SWE; 2	GER; 1	GER; 2	GBR; 1	GBR; 2	ITA; 1	ITA; 2	MAC; 1; 19	MAC; 2; 16			NC	0
2008	Liqui Moly Team Engstler	BMW 320si	BRA; 1; 10	BRA; 2; 17	MEX; 1; 18	MEX; 2; 16	ESP; 1; 17	ESP; 2; 17	FRA; 1; 19	FRA; 2; 15	CZE; 1; 16	CZE; 2; 23	POR; 1; 18	POR; 2; 18	GBR; 1; 17	GBR; 2; 13	GER; 1 Ret	GER; 2; 15	EUR; 1; 16	EUR; 2; 14	ITA; 1; 13	ITA; 2; 16	JPN; 1; 14	JPN; 2; 11	MAC; 1; 15	MAC; 2; 6	17th	3
2009	Liqui Moly Team Engstler	BMW 320si	BRA; 1; 12	BRA; 2; 16	MEX; 1; 14	MEX; 2; 11	MAR; 1; 11	MAR; 2; 7	FRA; 1; 6	FRA; 2 Ret	ESP; 1; 16	ESP; 2; 16	CZE; 1; 11	CZE; 2; 14	POR; 1; 20	POR; 2; 11	GBR; 1 NC	GBR; 2; 19	GER; 1; 7	**GER**; **2**; 25	ITA; 1; 11	ITA; 2; 13	JPN; 1 Ret	JPN; 2; 15	MAC; 1; 16	MAC; 2; 14	16th	7
2010	Liqui Moly Team Engstler	BMW 320si	BRA; 1; 14	BRA; 2; 11	MAR; 1; 12	MAR; 2; 12	ITA; 1 Ret	ITA; 2 DNS	BEL; 1 Ret	BEL; 2; 16	POR; 1; 13	POR; 2; 14	GBR; 1; 14	GBR; 2; 13	CZE; 1; 13	CZE; 2 Ret	GER; 1; 13	GER; 2; 15	ESP; 1; 15	ESP; 2; 14	JPN; 1; 13	JPN; 2; 10	MAC; 1; 9	MAC; 2; 10			17th	5
2011	Liqui Moly Team Engstler	BMW 320 TC	BRA; 1; 9	BRA; 2; 9	BEL; 1 Ret	BEL; 2; 12	ITA; 1; 9	ITA; 2; 9	HUN; 1; 15	HUN; 2; 6	CZE; 1; 16	CZE; 2 Ret	POR; 1; 11	POR; 2; 8	GBR; 1; 6	GBR; 2; 3	GER; 1; 16	**GER**; **2**; 1	ESP; 1 NC	**ESP**; **2**; 10	JPN; 1; 10	JPN; 2; 11	CHN; 1; 12	CHN; 2; 8	MAC; 1; 6	**MAC**; **2**; 7	8th	88
2012	Liqui Moly Team Engstler	BMW 320 TC	ITA; 1; 12	ITA; 2; 6	ESP; 1; 8	ESP; 2; 5	MAR; 1; 6	MAR; 2; 8	SVK; 1 Ret	SVK; 2; 13	HUN; 1 NC	HUN; 2; 9	AUT; 1; 11	AUT; 2; 9	POR; 1; 12	POR; 2; 9	BRA; 1; 17	BRA; 2 Ret	USA; 1; 7	USA; 2; 10	JPN; 1; 10	JPN; 2; 11	CHN; 1; 9	CHN; 2; 15	MAC; 1; 7	MAC; 2; 6	12th	64
2013	Liqui Moly Team Engstler	BMW 320 TC	ITA; 1; 19†	ITA; 2; 13	MAR; 1; 17	MAR; 2; 8	SVK; 1; 19	SVK; 2 Ret	HUN; 1; 13	HUN; 2 Ret	AUT; 1; 19†	AUT; 2; 14	RUS; 1; 19	RUS; 2; 15	POR; 1; 21†	POR; 2; 18	ARG; 1; 19	ARG; 2; 15	USA; 1; 17	USA; 2 Ret	JPN; 1	JPN; 2	CHN; 1; 13	CHN; 2; 28†	MAC; 1; 14	MAC; 2; 14	20th	4
2014	Liqui Moly Team Engstler	BMW 320 TC	MAR; 1; 12	MAR; 2; 7	FRA; 1; 16	FRA; 2; 16	HUN; 1; 16	HUN; 2; 15	SVK; 1; 17	SVK; 2 C	AUT; 1; 15	AUT; 2; 11	RUS; 1; 16	RUS; 2; 13	BEL; 1; 18	BEL; 2; 16	ARG; 1; 15	ARG; 2; 14	BEI; 1; 10	BEI; 2; 14	CHN; 1; 13	CHN; 2; 14	JPN; 1; 15	JPN; 2 Ret	MAC; 1; 14	MAC; 2; 10	17th	8

^{†} Driver did not finish the race, but was classified as he completed over 90% of the race distance.

=== Complete TCR International Series results ===
(key) (Races in bold indicate pole position) (Races in italics indicate fastest lap)

Year	Team	Car	1	2	3	4	5	6	7	8	9	10	11	12	13	14	15	16	17	18	19	20	21	22	DC	Pts
2015	Liqui Moly Team Engstler	Audi TT Cup	MYS; 1 Ret	MYS; 2 Ret	CHN; 1; 6	CHN; 2; 7	ESP; 1 Ret	ESP; 2 Ret	POR; 1	POR; 2	ITA; 1	ITA; 2	AUT; 1	AUT; 2	RUS; 1	RUS; 2	RBR; 1	RBR; 2	SIN; 1	SIN; 2	THA; 1	THA; 2	MAC; 1	MAC; 2	18th	16

Sporting positions
Preceded by Jürgen Hohenester	ADAC Procar Series Champion; 2000	Succeeded by Markus Gedlich
Preceded by Toni Ruokonen	Asian Touring Car Championship Champion; 2005–2006	Succeeded by Fariqe Hairuman
Preceded by Vincent Radermecker	ADAC Procar Series Champion; 2007	Succeeded by Phillip Geipel
Preceded by James Nash	World Touring Car Championship; Independents' Trophy Winner; 2014	Succeeded by Norbert Michelisz
