= 2011 FIA WTCC Race of UK =

(United Kingdom) 2011 FIA WTCC Race of UK
Race details
- Round 7 of 12 in the 2011 World Touring Car Championship at Donington Park in Leicestershire, England.
- Date: 17 July, 2011
- Location: Leicestershire, England
- Course: Donington Park; 4.003 kilometres (2.487 mi)

Race One
- Laps: 13
Pole position
Driver		(France) Yvan Muller	Chevrolet RML
Time		1:38.470	
Podium
First		(France) Yvan Muller	Chevrolet RML
Second		(United Kingdom) Robert Huff	Chevrolet RML
Third		(Switzerland) Alain Menu	Chevrolet RML
Fastest Lap
Driver		(United Kingdom) Robert Huff	Chevrolet RML
Time		1:37.380	

Race Two
- Laps: 13
Podium
First		(France) Yvan Muller	Chevrolet RML
Second		(United Kingdom) Robert Huff	Chevrolet RML
Third		(Germany) Franz Engstler	Liqui Moly Team Engstler
Fastest Lap
Driver		(France) Yvan Muller	Chevrolet RML
Time		1:37.993	

The 2011 FIA WTCC Race of UK was the seventh round of the 2011 World Touring Car Championship season and the seventh running of the FIA WTCC Race of UK. It was held on 17 July 2011 at the Donington Park circuit in Leicestershire, England.

Both races were won by Chevrolet RML driver Yvan Muller. Franz Engstler finished on the podium in the WTCC for the first time in race two when he finished third.

== Background ==
Coming to the Race of UK, local driver Robert Huff was leading the drivers' championship ahead of Muller. Norbert Michelisz was leading the Yokohama Independents' Trophy.

Aleksei Dudukalo became the final SEAT driver to switch to the new 1.6 turbo engine in his Lukoil-SUNRED car. Fabio Fabiani returned to Proteam Racing in the naturally aspirated BMW 320si having last raced at the Race of Hungary. Regular Scandinavian Touring Car Championship driver Colin Turkington joined Wiechers-Sport in place of Stefano D'Aste who was not available for the British round.

Proteam Racing driver Javier Villa would drop five places on the grid for race one after causing a collision with Fredy Barth at the Race of Portugal.

== Report ==
=== Testing and free practice ===
Muller topped the Friday test session with Robert Dahlgren's Volvo second and Alain Menu third in his Chevrolet. Villa was the best independent driver in seventh and Turkington was ninth on his return to the WTCC. SUNRED Engineering's Tiago Monteiro did not complete any laps due to engine problems.

The first free practice session on Saturday morning took place in heavy rain. Huff stood at the top of the times early on before conditions improved and times tumbled, Muller displaced him during the middle of the session before Huff set the fastest time later on. Several drivers spun on the wet track, notably Turkington who went through the gravel at Redgate.

The track continued to dry out as free practice two took place in the afternoon, Huff was quickest once again with Gabriele Tarquini second and Muller third. Turkington only emerged from his garage towards the end of the session before setting the nineteenth best time while Fabiani was unable to take part due to differential problems. Yokohama Trophy leader Michelisz ended his session in the Craner Curves gravel trap.

=== Qualifying ===
There had been a brief rain shower prior to the start of qualifying so Q1 took place on a drying track. Muller set the fastest time at the end of the session with Huff second and Menu third. ROAL Motorsport's Tom Coronel ended the session tenth to take pole position for race two with Michel Nykjær joining him on the front row after ending the first session ninth. 2009 champion Tarquini failed to get through to Q2 and lined up eleventh for both races while Michelisz and Dahlgren would start near the back of the field after setting poor times.

The top ten cars went through to Q2 where Muller led another Chevrolet 1–2–3 at the end of the session. Monteiro qualified fourth ahead of Turkington in fifth who was the top Yokohama Trophy driver. Darryl O'Young for bamboo-engineering, Engstler, Coronel, Villa and Nykjær rounded out the top ten.

=== Warm-Up ===
Dahlgren was quickest in Sunday morning's warm–up session ahead of Tarquini, Turkington and pole sitter Muller.

=== Race One ===
The three Chevrolets led away from the rolling start with Muller first and Huff second with Menu close behind looking to take second place at Redgate. Tarquini and Turkington made contact at the Craner Curves, Tarquini nudged the BMW and Turkington dropped from fifth to tenth after going onto the grass. Tarquini then climbed up to fourth by the end of the first lap while Monteiro retired with suspension failure. Tarquini dropped to fifth after three laps when he was passed by Coronel. Nykjær in seventh was proving to be hard to pass and was holding up Kristian Poulsen, Turkington had moved back up to ninth but was unable to pass either of the two cars in front. Dahlgren and Michelisz had been on the move up through the field from the back of the grid but their progress was halted when they caught up with the train of cars. Poulsen tried to make a move on Poulsen's BMW but instead rode up over the back of it while Michelisz spun and retired with broken steering. Turkington then locked up at McLeans on lap seven and shot across the grass to rejoin in sixteenth place. Back at the front, Huff was closing in on Muller but was unable to get close enough to make a move for the lead. Muller led a Chevrolet 1–2–3 with Coronel fourth and Tarquini fifth. Engstler came home sixth to take the independents' victory ahead of teammate Poulsen. Turkington had climbed back up to ninth place before the end of the race having forced Fredy Barth and Mehdi Bennani off the road to do so, O'Young completed the top ten. Fabiani was disqualified after his mechanics worked on the car during the parc fermé period.

=== Race Two ===
Coronel led away from the standing start and retained his lead until the second lap when a mistake dropped him to sixth and allowed Villa to get through and assume the lead. Nykjær went out on the opening lap when he went into the gravel at Coppice. Further down the field, Huff was defending sixth place from Muller but was tapped at the hairpin. Tarquini was spun by Tarquini and dropped in the order to sixteenth for the second race in a row. While Huff regained control of his Chevrolet Cruze, Muller went through to take his position. Engstler then took the lead while Menu clashed with Villa on the third lap and he dropped in the order. Engstler held first place until lap five when he was passed by Muller and then eventually Huff. Poulsen and Michelisz came together on lap eight with the resulting damage forcing the Liqui Moly Team Engstler driver to retire, Michelisz continued but was down the order in twelfth. O'Young and Bennani benefitted from the incident and moved up. Poulsen would later incur a five-place grid penalty for the Race of Germany. Muller claimed the win ahead of Huff and Engstler who scored his first podium result and was also the independent victor again. Coronel was fourth ahead of Menu, Dahlgren came from the back of the grid to sixth ahead of Tarquini. O'Young, Bennani and recovering Turkington completed the top ten. Fabiani was excluded for not using the official WTCC fuel.

== Results ==
=== Qualifying ===
Pos.	No.	Name	Team	Car	C	Q1	Q2
1	1	(France) Yvan Muller	Chevrolet RML	Chevrolet Cruze 1.6T		1:40.422	1:38.470
2	2	(United Kingdom) Robert Huff	Chevrolet RML	Chevrolet Cruze 1.6T		1:40.526	1:38.551
3	8	(Switzerland) Alain Menu	Chevrolet RML	Chevrolet Cruze 1.6T		1:40.838	1:38.794
4	18	(Portugal) Tiago Monteiro	SUNRED Engineering	SUNRED SR León 1.6T		1:41.214	1:39.167
5	29	(United Kingdom) Colin Turkington	Wiechers-Sport	BMW 320 TC	Y	1:40.965	1:39.332
6	9	(Hong Kong) Darryl O'Young	bamboo-engineering	Chevrolet Cruze 1.6T	Y	1:40.895	1:39.471
7	12	(Germany) Franz Engstler	Liqui Moly Team Engstler	BMW 320 TC	Y	1:40.995	1:39.686
8	15	(Netherlands) **Tom Coronel**	ROAL Motorsport	BMW 320 TC		1:41.431	1:39.966
9	20	(Spain) Javier Villa	Proteam Racing	BMW 320 TC	Y	1:41.221	1:40.047
10	17	(Denmark) Michel Nykjær	SUNRED Engineering	SUNRED SR León 1.6T	Y	1:41.392	1:40.152
11	3	(Italy) Gabriele Tarquini	Lukoil-SUNRED	SUNRED SR León 1.6T		1:41.450	
12	11	(Denmark) Kristian Poulsen	Liqui Moly Team Engstler	BMW 320 TC	Y	1:41.530	
13	7	(Switzerland) Fredy Barth	SEAT Swiss Racing by SUNRED	SUNRED SR León 1.6T	Y	1:41.557	
14	74	(Spain) Pepe Oriola	SUNRED Engineering	SUNRED SR León 1.6T	Y	1:41.590	
15	25	(Morocco) Mehdi Bennani	Proteam Racing	BMW 320 TC	Y	1:42.179	
16	10	(Japan) Yukinori Taniguchi	bamboo-engineering	Chevrolet Cruze 1.6T	Y	1:42.576	
17	4	(Russia) Aleksei Dudukalo	Lukoil-SUNRED	SUNRED SR León 1.6T	Y	1:42.871	
18	5	(Hungary) Norbert Michelisz	Zengő-Dension Team	BMW 320 TC	Y	1:45.720	
107% time: 1:47.451
–	30	(Sweden) Robert Dahlgren	Polestar Racing	Volvo C30 Drive		1:48.569	
–	21	(Italy) Fabio Fabiani	Proteam Racing	BMW 320si	Y	1:55.478	

- **Bold** denotes Pole position for second race.

=== Race 1 ===
Pos.	No.	Name	Team	Car	C	Laps	Time/Retired	Grid	Points
1	1	(France) Yvan Muller	Chevrolet RML	Chevrolet Cruze 1.6T		13	21:21.521	1	25
2	2	(United Kingdom) **Robert Huff**	Chevrolet RML	Chevrolet Cruze 1.6T		13	+1.136	2	18
3	8	(Switzerland) Alain Menu	Chevrolet RML	Chevrolet Cruze 1.6T		13	+3.903	3	15
4	15	(Netherlands) Tom Coronel	ROAL Motorsport	BMW 320 TC		13	+8.708	8	12
5	3	(Italy) Gabriele Tarquini	Lukoil-SUNRED	SUNRED SR León 1.6T		13	+9.299	10	10
6	12	(Germany) Franz Engstler	Liqui Moly Team Engstler	BMW 320 TC	Y	13	+14.186	7	8
7	17	(Denmark) Michel Nykjær	SUNRED Engineering	SUNRED SR León 1.6T	Y	13	+18.974	9	6
8	30	(Sweden) Robert Dahlgren	Polestar Racing	Volvo C30 Drive		13	+19.191	19	4
9	11	(Denmark) Kristian Poulsen	Liqui Moly Team Engstler	BMW 320 TC	Y	13	+20.536	11	2
10	29	(United Kingdom) Colin Turkington	Wiechers-Sport	BMW 320 TC	Y	13	+28.804	5	1
11	9	(Hong Kong) Darryl O'Young	bamboo-engineering	Chevrolet Cruze 1.6T	Y	13	+29.831	6	
12	74	(Spain) Pepe Oriola	SUNRED Engineering	SUNRED SR León 1.6T	Y	13	+29.966	13	
13	7	(Switzerland) Fredy Barth	SEAT Swiss Racing by SUNRED	SUNRED SR León 1.6T	Y	13	+34.093	12	
14	25	(Morocco) Mehdi Bennani	Proteam Racing	BMW 320 TC	Y	13	+34.526	15	
15	4	(Russia) Aleksei Dudukalo	Lukoil-SUNRED	SUNRED SR León 1.6T	Y	13	+39.419	17	
16	10	(Japan) Yukinori Taniguchi	bamboo-engineering	Chevrolet Cruze 1.6T	Y	13	+1:07.938	16	
17	20	(Spain) Javier Villa	Proteam Racing	BMW 320 TC	Y	12	+1 Lap	14	
NC	5	(Hungary) Norbert Michelisz	Zengő-Dension Team	BMW 320 TC	Y	7	+6 Laps	18	
Ret	18	(Portugal) Tiago Monteiro	SUNRED Engineering	SUNRED SR León 1.6T		4	Suspension	4	
DSQ	21	(Italy) Fabio Fabiani	Proteam Racing	BMW 320si	Y	12	Disqualified	20	

- **Bold** denotes Fastest lap.

=== Race 2 ===
Pos.	No.	Name	Team	Car	C	Laps	Time/Retired	Grid	Points
1	1	(France) **Yvan Muller**	Chevrolet RML	Chevrolet Cruze 1.6T		13	21:33.182	10	25
2	2	(United Kingdom) Robert Huff	Chevrolet RML	Chevrolet Cruze 1.6T		13	+0.957	9	18
3	12	(Germany) Franz Engstler	Liqui Moly Team Engstler	BMW 320 TC	Y	13	+3.676	5	15
4	15	(Netherlands) Tom Coronel	ROAL Motorsport	BMW 320 TC		13	+4.826	1	12
5	8	(Switzerland) Alain Menu	Chevrolet RML	Chevrolet Cruze 1.6T		13	+8.392	8	10
6	30	(Sweden) Robert Dahlgren	Polestar Racing	Volvo C30 Drive		13	+9.016	20	8
7	3	(Italy) Gabriele Tarquini	Lukoil-SUNRED	SUNRED SR León 1.6T		13	+11.587	11	6
8	9	(Hong Kong) Darryl O'Young	bamboo-engineering	Chevrolet Cruze 1.6T	Y	13	+13.031	7	4
9	25	(Morocco) Mehdi Bennani	Proteam Racing	BMW 320 TC	Y	13	+13.959	15	2
10	29	(United Kingdom) Colin Turkington	Wiechers-Sport	BMW 320 TC	Y	13	+14.662	6	1
11	7	(Switzerland) Fredy Barth	SEAT Swiss Racing by SUNRED	SUNRED SR León 1.6T	Y	13	+19.693	13	
12	5	(Hungary) Norbert Michelisz	Zengő-Dension Team	BMW 320 TC	Y	13	+24.802	18	
13	10	(Japan) Yukinori Taniguchi	bamboo-engineering	Chevrolet Cruze 1.6T	Y	13	+31.646	16	
14	4	(Russia) Aleksei Dudukalo	Lukoil-SUNRED	SUNRED SR León 1.6T	Y	13	+33.495	17	
15	74	(Spain) Pepe Oriola	SUNRED Engineering	SUNRED SR León 1.6T	Y	13	+1:26.671	14	
16	20	(Spain) Javier Villa	Proteam Racing	BMW 320 TC	Y	12	+1 Lap	3	
17	11	(Denmark) Kristian Poulsen	Liqui Moly Team Engstler	BMW 320 TC	Y	9	+4 Laps	12	
Ret	18	(Portugal) Tiago Monteiro	SUNRED Engineering	SUNRED SR León 1.6T		1	Race incident	4	
Ret	17	(Denmark) Michel Nykjær	SUNRED Engineering	SUNRED SR León 1.6T	Y	0	Race incident	2	
DSQ	21	(Italy) Fabio Fabiani	Proteam Racing	BMW 320si	Y	13	Disqualified	19	

- **Bold** denotes Fastest lap.

== Standings after the event ==
Drivers' Championship standings

	Pos	Driver	Points
	1	(United Kingdom) Robert Huff	263
	2	(France) Yvan Muller	248
	3	(Switzerland) Alain Menu	192
1	4	(Netherlands) Tom Coronel	124
1	5	(Italy) Gabriele Tarquini	115

Yokohama Independents' Trophy standings

	Pos	Driver	Points
	1	(Hungary) Norbert Michelisz	77
	2	(Denmark) Kristian Poulsen	75
1	3	(Hong Kong) Darryl O'Young	72
2	4	(Germany) Franz Engstler	67
2	5	(Spain) Javier Villa	64

Manufacturers' Championship standings

	Pos	Manufacturer	Points
	1	(United States) Chevrolet	577
1	2	(Germany) BMW Customer Racing Teams	328
1	3	(Spain) SR Customer Racing	313
	4	(Sweden) Volvo Polestar Evaluation Team	92

- Note: Only the top five positions are included for both sets of drivers' standings.
