= Daewoo Lacetti =

Compact car by GM Korea

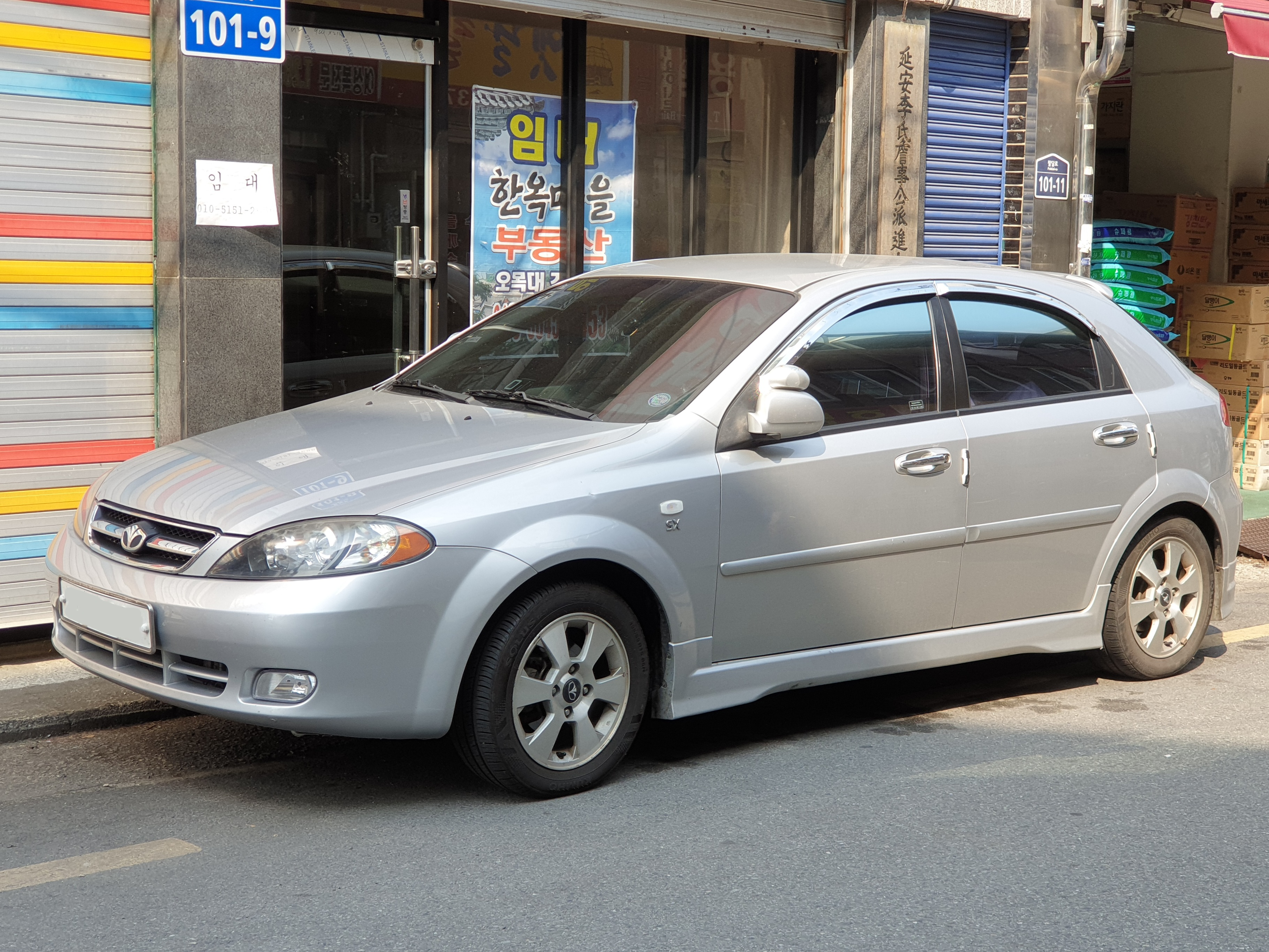
- J200 Daewoo Lacetti hatchback

Overview
- Manufacturer: Daewoo (General Motors)
- Production: 2002–2011 (South Korea); 2003–2024 (GM Uzbekistan)

Body and chassis
- Class: Compact car (C)
- Layout: Front-engine, front-wheel-drive

Chronology
- Predecessor: Daewoo Nubira
- Successor: Daewoo Lacetti Premiere; Chevrolet Cruze; Buick Excelle (second generation) (China)

The Daewoo Lacetti (Korean: 대우 라세티) is a compact car manufactured and marketed globally by GM Korea since 2002. The first-generation Lacetti was available as a four-door sedan and five-door station wagon, styled by Pininfarina—and five-door hatchback styled by Giorgetto Giugiaro. The sedan and wagon were marketed as the Daewoo Nubira in some European markets and as the Suzuki Forenza in North America. The hatchback, was introduced in 2004 and marketed as Daewoo Lacetti5 in South Korea, Suzuki Reno in the United States. After the 2004 model year, it was marketed as Chevrolet Nubira and Lacetti in Europe, as the Chevrolet Optra in Canada, Latin America, Africa, Middle East, India, Pakistan, Japan and Southeast Asia, and as the Holden Viva in Australia and New Zealand.

In 2008, the second-generation Lacetti was launched as the Daewoo Lacetti Premiere, a badge-engineered version of the Chevrolet Cruze, co-developed by GM Daewoo, Holden, and General Motors. It was marketed under the Daewoo marque until the beginning of 2011, when the brand was discontinued, and was thereafter marketed under the Chevrolet and Holden brands.

The name Lacetti derives from the Latin "Lacertus", meaning "youthful".

== First generation (J200; 2002) ==
First generation (J200)
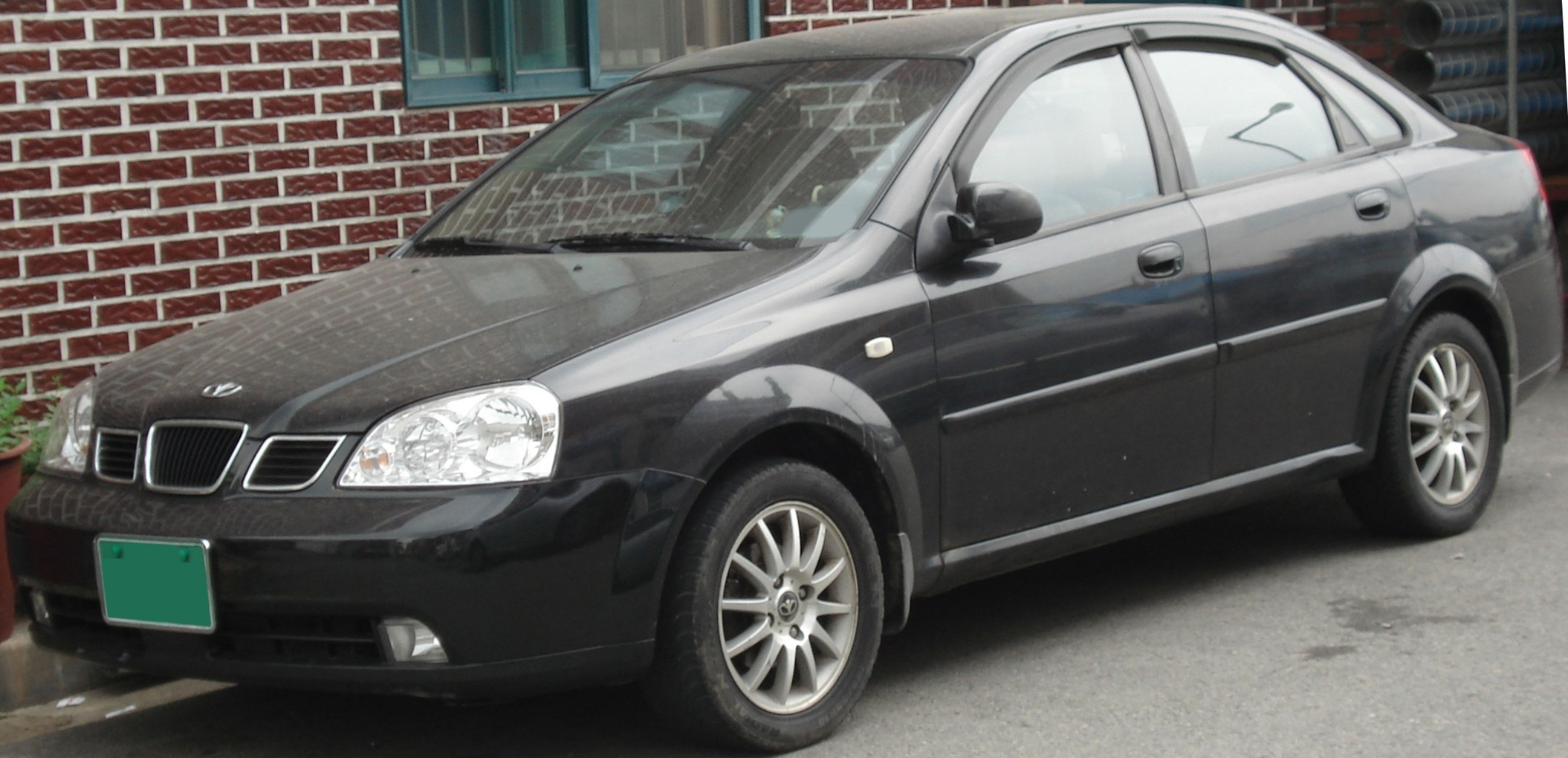

Overview
- Also called: Buick Excelle (China); Chevrolet Optra; Daewoo Nubira (Europe, station wagon and sedan, 2002–2005); Chevrolet Nubira (Europe, station wagon and sedan, 2005–2009); Chevrolet Lacetti (Europe, hatchback, 2005–2009; Uzbekistan); Daewoo Gentra (Uzbekistan, 2013–2015); Ravon Gentra (Russia, 2015–2020); Chevrolet Estate (wagon, Indonesia); Holden Viva (Australia); Suzuki Reno (United States, hatchback); Suzuki Forenza (United States, station wagon and sedan)
- Production: 2002–2009 (South Korea); 2004–2013 (Colombia); 2003–2016 (China); 2003–2012 (India); 2007–2012 (Russia); 2008–2024 (Uzbekistan)
- Assembly: South Korea: Gunsan; Colombia: Bogotá (GM Colmotores); India: Halol (GM India); China: Shanghai (Shanghai GM); Kazakhstan: Ust-Kamenogorsk; Russia: Kaliningrad; Taiwan: Miaoli; Thailand: Rayong (GM Thailand); Venezuela: Valencia (GM Venezuela); Vietnam: Hanoi (GM Vietnam); Uzbekistan: Asaka (GM Uzbekistan); Azerbaijan: Hajiqabul (AzerMash) (2021–present)
- Designer: Goran Popović at Pininfarina (sedan, station wagon); Giorgetto Giugiaro at Italdesign (hatchback)

Body and chassis
- Body style: 4-door sedan 5-door hatchback 5-door station wagon
- Platform: Daewoo J
- Related: Baojun 630 Chery A5 Chery E5

Powertrain
- Engine: petrol: 1.4 L E-TEC II I4; 1.5 L E-TEC II I4; 1.6 L E-TEC II I4; 1.6 L E-TEC II I4 (also CNG); 1.8 L Family II I4; 2.0 L Family II I4; diesel: 2.0 L Z20S I4
- Transmission: 4-speed automatic 5-speed manual

Dimensions
- Wheelbase: 2,600 mm (102.4 in)
- Length: Sedan: 4,500–4,515 mm (177.2–177.8 in); Hatchback: 4,295 mm (169.1 in); Station Wagon: 4,565–4,580 mm (179.7–180.3 in)
- Width: 1,725 mm (67.9 in)
- Height: 1,445 mm (56.9 in); Station Wagon: 1,460–1,500 mm (57.5–59.1 in)
- Curb weight: 1,250–1,295 kg (2,756–2,855 lb)

Chronology
- Successor: Chevrolet Cruze; Suzuki SX4 (United States); Chevrolet Onix (Uzbekistan)

The Lacetti was developed based on its predecessor Nubira under Daewoo before it was acquired by GM. The four-door sedan, designed by Pininfarina, was launched in South Korea on 25 November 2002, following a development period of two years and six months.

A pre-production prototype of the five-door hatchback, styled by Giorgetto Giugiaro, was shown at the Frankfurt Motor Show in September 2003 with production starting in December. The hatchback featured a different exterior and interior design than the sedan.

At the Geneva Motor Show in March 2004, Daewoo revealed the station wagon body variant penned by Pininfarina with the hatchback's updated interior and a facelifted derivative of the sedan's frontal styling. The facelift replaced the three-slot grille with a single item for a new full-length item featuring a bold horizontal bar capped in the center by the company's logo. The wagon's door handles ditch the lift-up variety from the sedan and hatchback for pullout versions. A facelift for the sedan was released on 25 March incorporating these new door handles, front-end styling and interior changes. The hatchback also received new door handles around this time.

The sedan was facelifted for some markets from 2007, receiving the same front end as the hatchback featured since its debut. This version was only produced in emergent markets, such as Colombia, India or Thailand, and in 2013–2016 in Uzbekistan as the Daewoo Gentra.

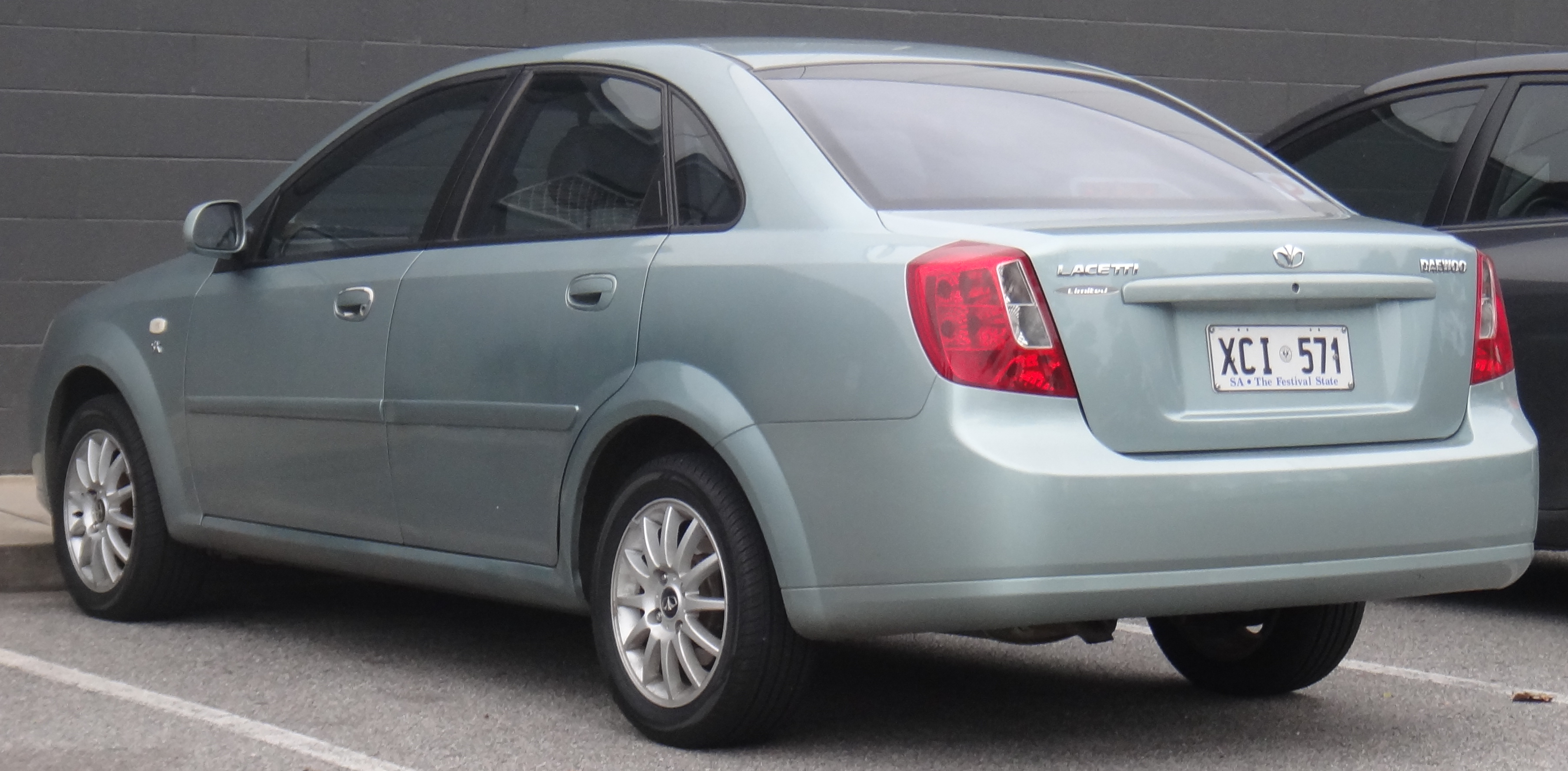
Daewoo Lacetti sedan (pre-facelift)

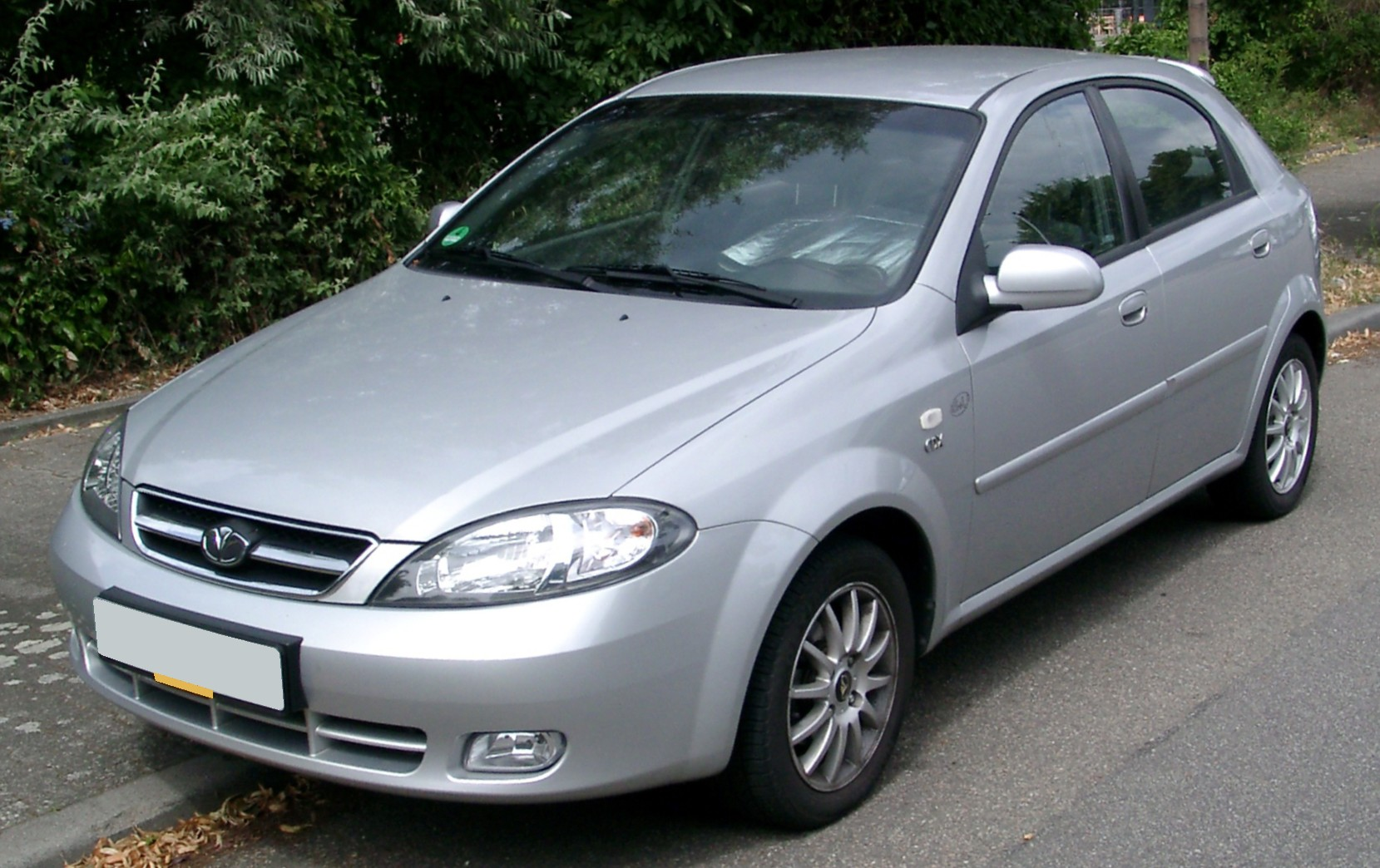
Daewoo Lacetti hatchback (pre-facelift)

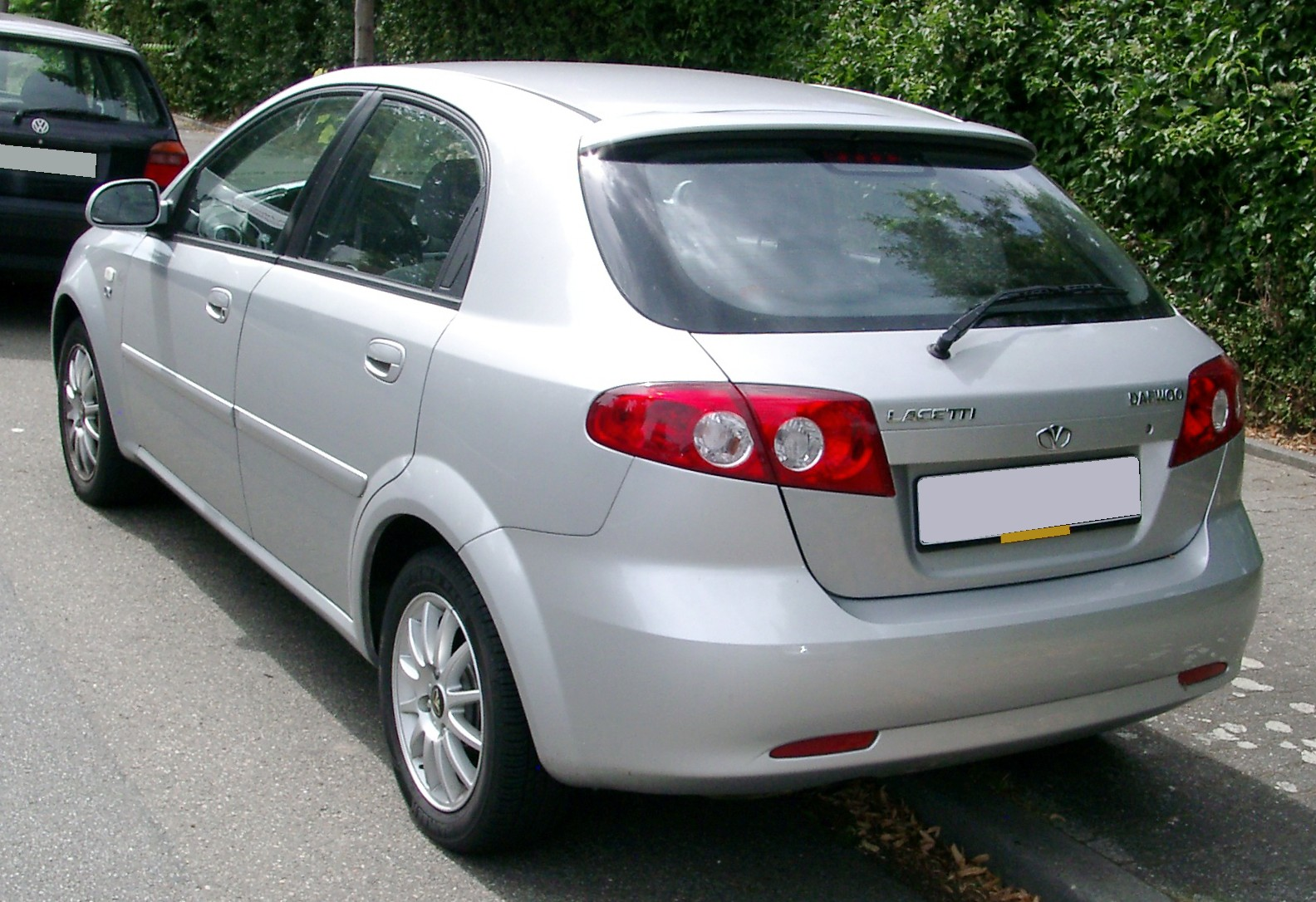
Daewoo Lacetti hatchback (pre-facelift)

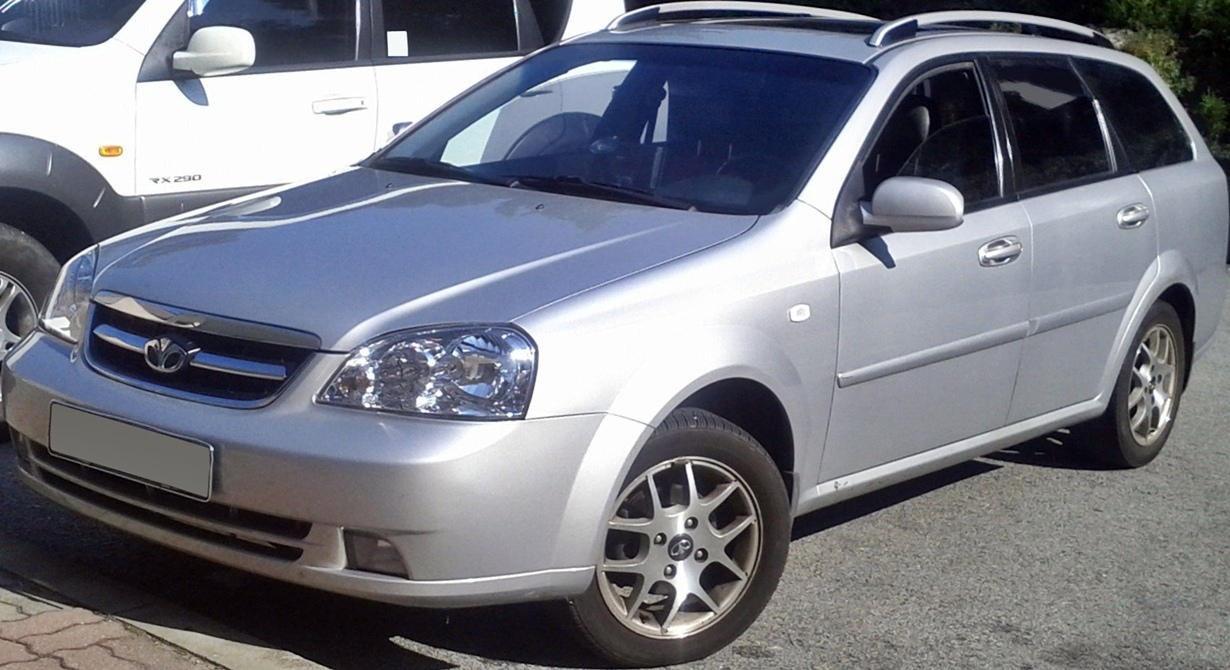
Daewoo Lacetti wagon (facelift)

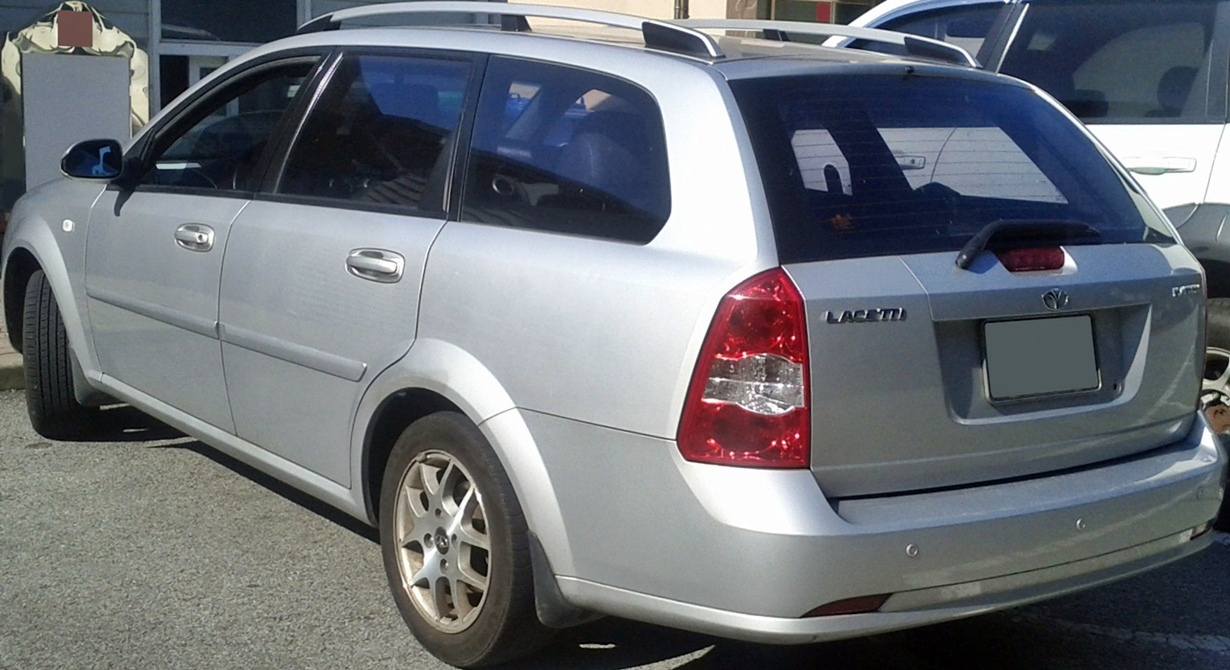
Daewoo Lacetti wagon (facelift)

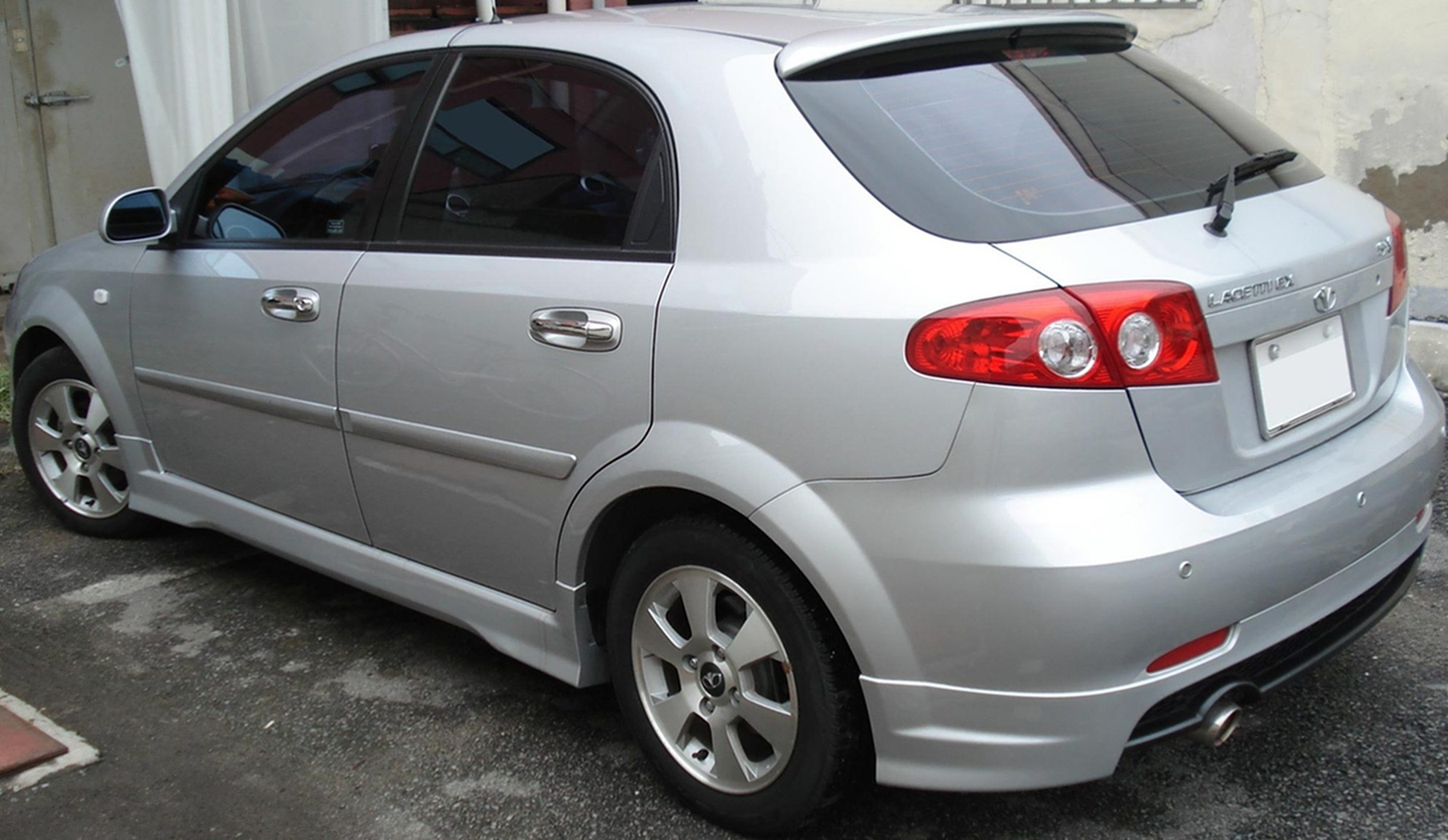
Daewoo Lacetti hatchback (facelift)

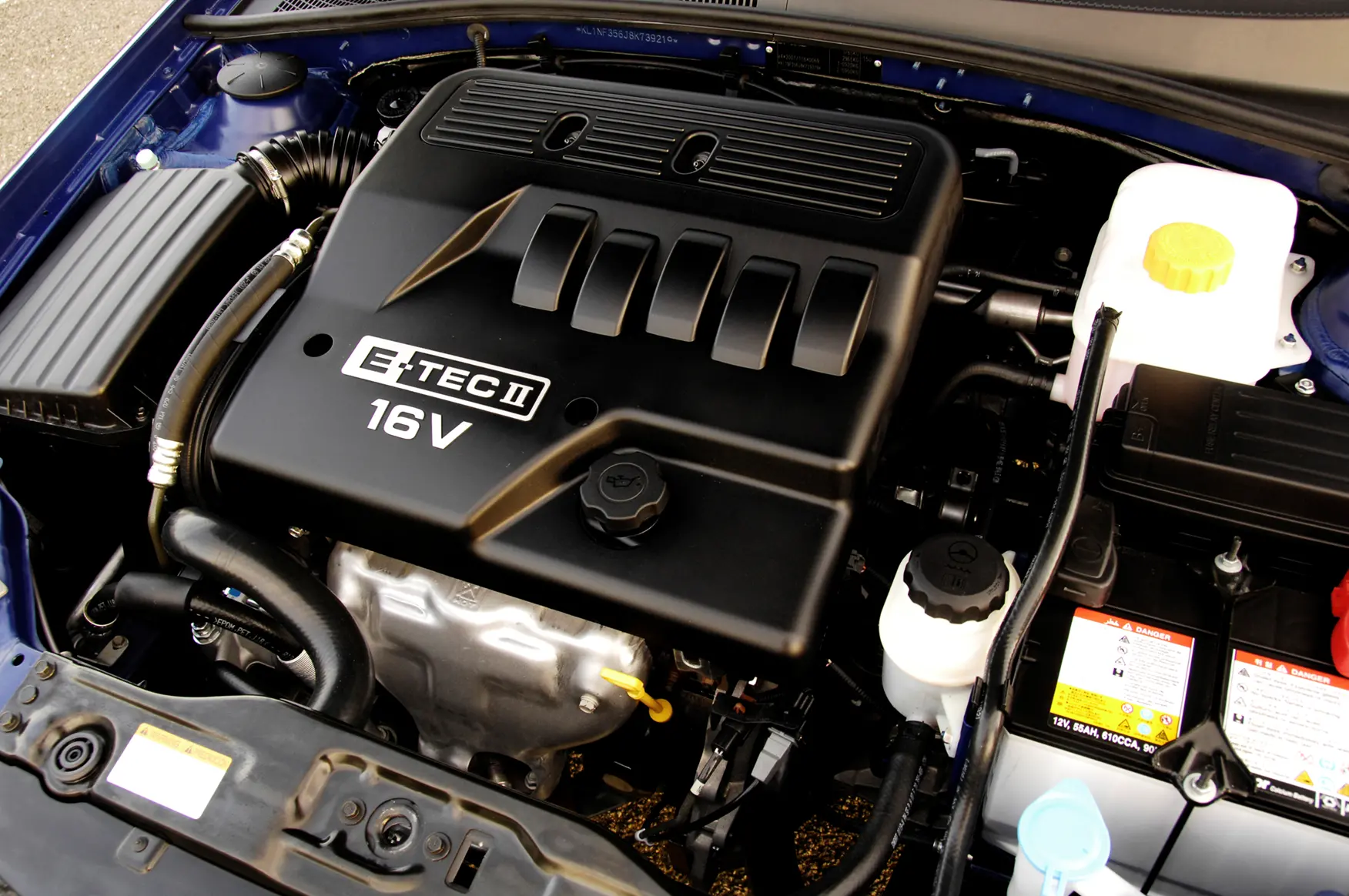
Engine: 4 CYL 1.6 DOHC MPI, 16 Valves

=== Marketing and production ===
==== South Korea ====
In South Korea, the four-door Daewoo Lacetti was released in 2002. The five-door hatchback showed off only after the 2004 facelift of the sedan, which mainly included a new front grille, switching from a three-part corporate Daewoo grille to a simpler, Chevrolet-style grille. The hatchback name was Lacetti5, offering a specific design for the front, rear and dashboard.

The wagon version, called simply the Lacetti Wagon, was introduced in late 2007—though it was already sold in many other countries. It had the same dashboard as the hatchback, with the sedan front end. At the same time, GM Daewoo introduced the VM Motori diesel engines on the Lacetti range.

When the Lacetti Premiere was introduced in November 2008, the sedan and wagon version sales were discontinued, leaving the only hatchback in the range, renamed Lacetti EX. The Lacetti EX was discontinued in October 2009.

==== Australia and New Zealand ====
In Australia and New Zealand the Daewoo Lacetti was briefly sold between September 2003 and December 2004 as a four-door sedan. At this time, Daewoo withdrew from the Australian market. Fitted with the 1.8-liter engine rated at 90 kW (120 hp) and 165 N⋅m (122 lb⋅ft), the Lacetti offered standard five-speed manual or optional four-speed automatic transmission. The single trim level, called SX, included are dual front airbags, air conditioning, power steering, keyless entry, power windows, CD player, and an alarm. The special edition SX Limited from October 2003 added anti-lock brakes, side impact airbags, alloy wheels, climate control air conditioning, six-stacker CD player, tilt/telescopic steering wheel, lumbar support for the front passenger seat, and leather trim.

From 2005, the Lacetti (sedan and wagon) and Lacetti hatchback were sold together as the JF series Holden Viva. It was introduced at around the same time as the Daewoo Gentra-based Holden Barina. Unlike the Barina, however, the Viva was meant to be below the premium Holden Astra as a budget alternative.

Despite the Viva's lower price compared to the Astra (A$17,990 compared to A$21,990), the Astra continued to outsell the Viva by a factor of about two-to-one.

With the release of the all new Holden Cruze in mid-2009 the Viva ceased to be sold in Australia. In New Zealand, where many cars are imported second-hand from Japan, several Japanese specification Chevrolet Optra sedans and wagons were also sold.

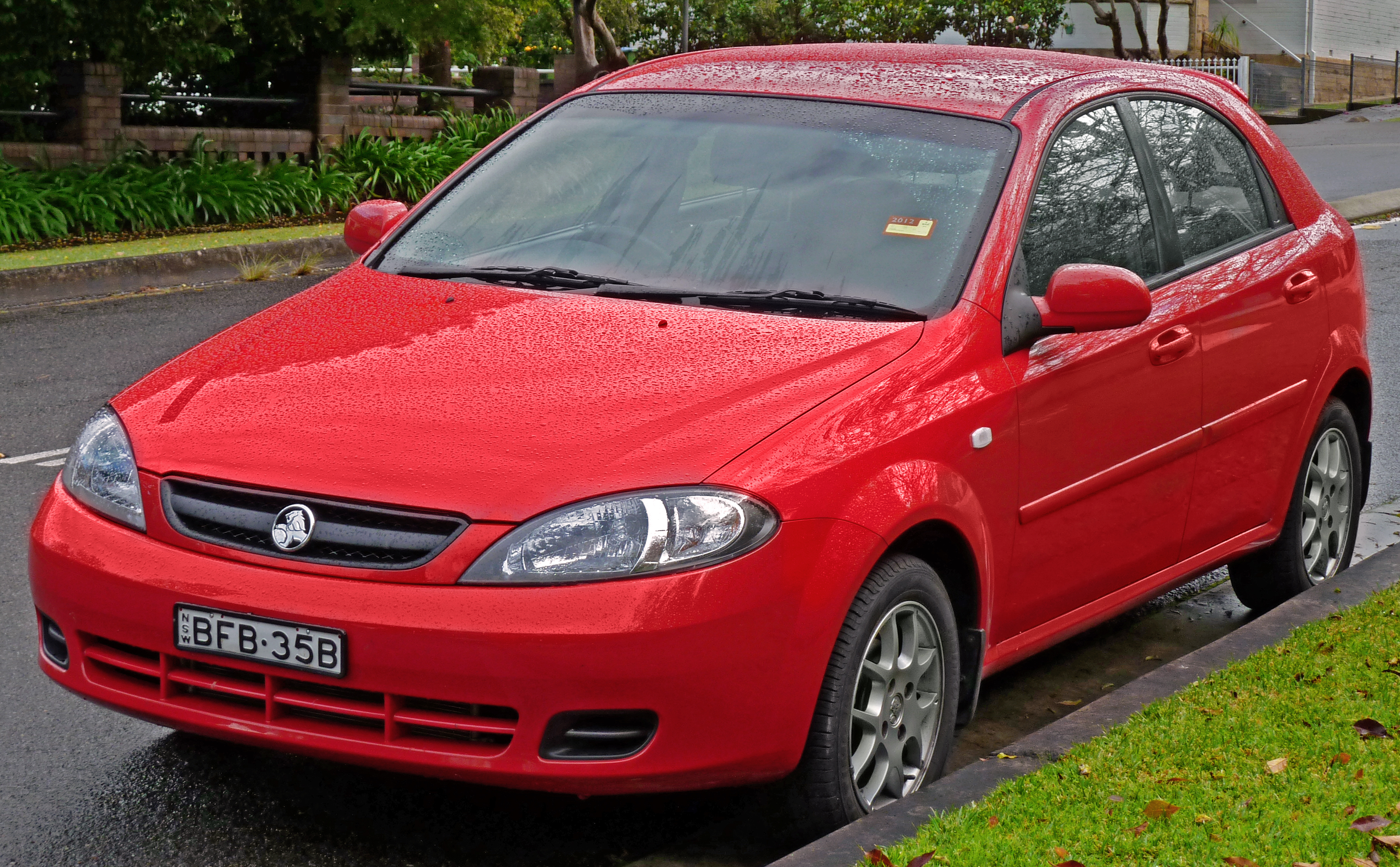
Holden Viva Hatchback

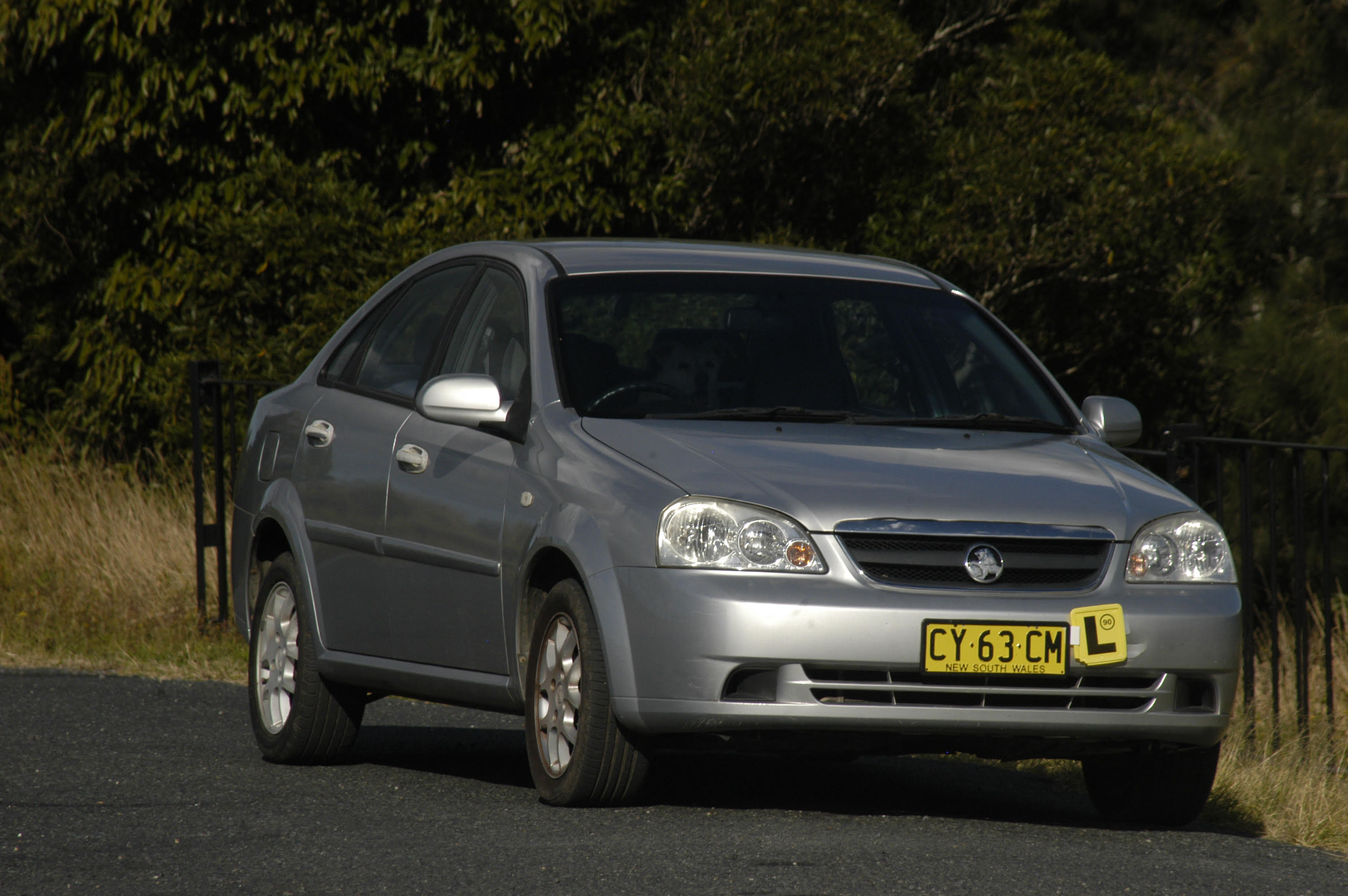
Holden JF Viva Sedan

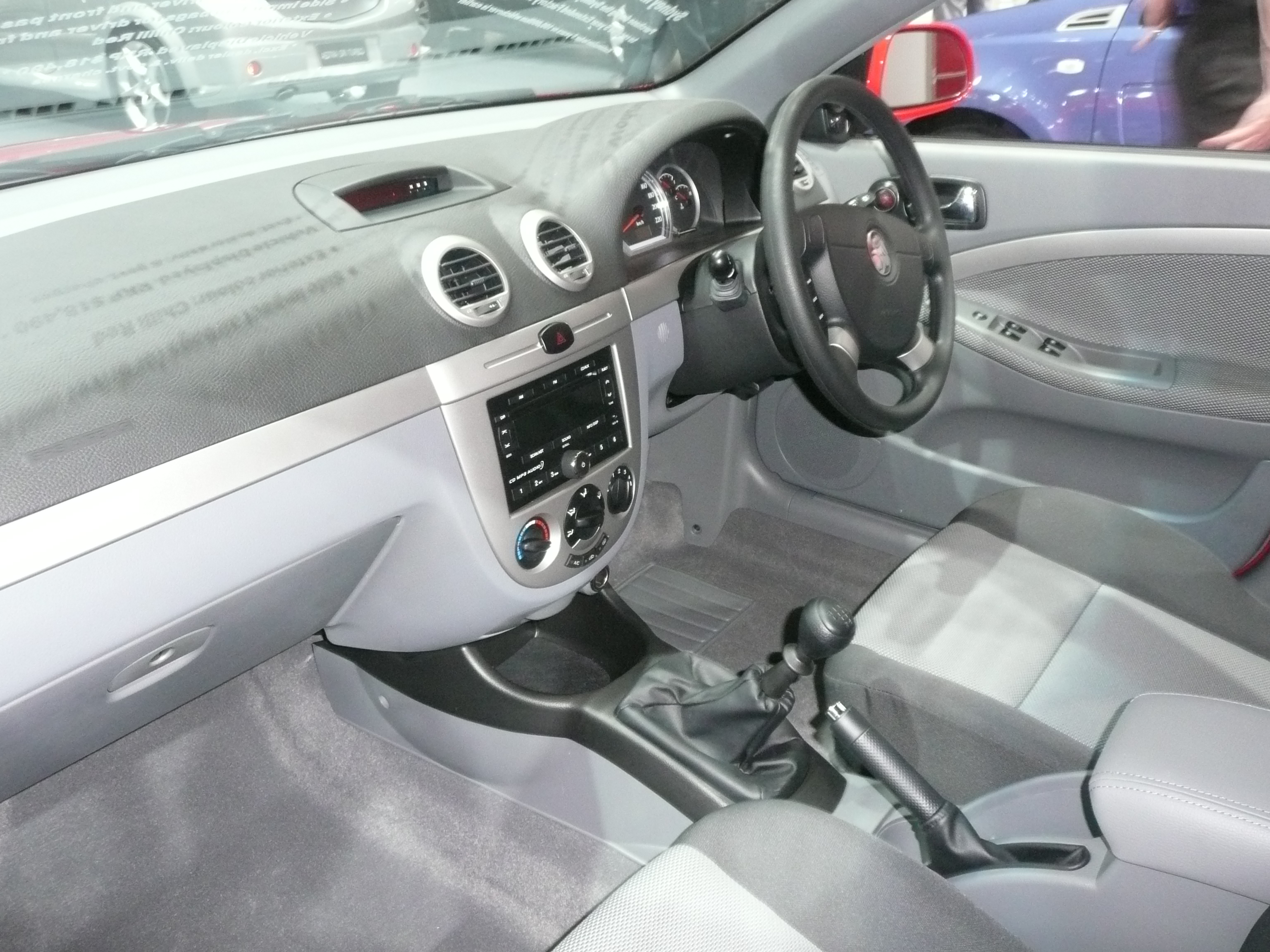
Interior

==== North America ====
The Lacetti was sold in United States and Canada as the Chevrolet Optra. Two body styles were available for the entirety of its sales run, a four-door hatchback (the Optra5) and an Optra wagon, all in LS or LT trim levels (2005 wagon only had base or LS trim levels), while sedan was available for model years 2004 and 2005, but was removed for 2006.

All are powered by the 2.0-liter inline-four D-TEC engine, rated at 119 hp (89 kW) at 5400 rpm and 126 lb⋅ft (171 N⋅m) of torque at 4000 rpm, driving the front wheels through either a five-speed manual transmission or a four-speed automatic. Despite its compact size and the 2.0-liter engine, fuel economy was poor rated at 10.7 and 7.4 L/100 km (22 and 32 mpg_{‑US}) for city and highway driving, respectively, which was worse than mid-size cars like the Toyota Camry or Honda Accord, considering that the Optra was a compact car.

The main selling point of the Optra was its low price at $12,000 MSRP. The car was positioned as a versatile and fun to drive but affordable budget compact family car. The Optra slotted between the Cobalt and the Aveo, and it replaced the Daewoo Nubira.

Brakes are disc, front and rear. Independent suspension, 15-inch wheels, and CD player were standard on the LS sedan, with optional ABS and air conditioning; the LT adds standard air conditioning and cruise control, standard fog lamps on both LS and LT, and an optional sunroof. The sedan is rated as an Ultra Low Emissions Vehicle.

The Optra5 hatchback was added to the line-up for 2004 and was more contemporary in styling and equipment, with projector type headlights and fog lamps, clear taillight lenses, and blackout grille. In addition to the same options available on the sedan LS and LT models, an options package contained alloy wheels, sunroof, spoiler, leather steering wheel and shift knob, and steering wheel mounted controls for the eight-speaker audio system.

The Optra wagon was also added to the line-up for 2005, sharing the sedan's front styling. The wagon has standard alloy roof rails, 60/40 folding rear seat, and a 12-volt power outlet in the rear compartment, in addition to the same options available on the sedan LS and LT models.

General Motors Canada continued the importation of Optra for 2008, leaving 2007 as the last model year.

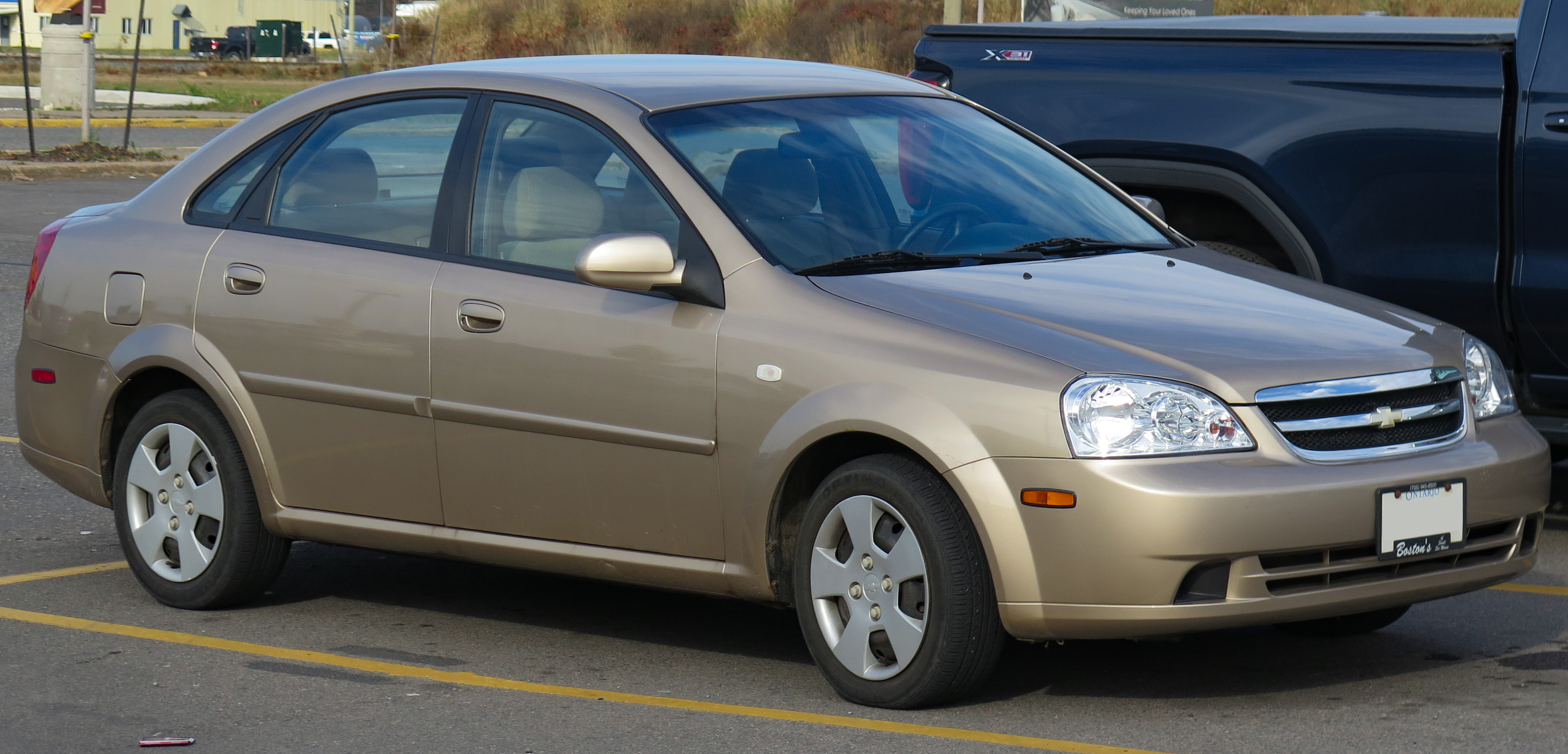
2005 Chevrolet Optra LS Sedan (United States and Canada)

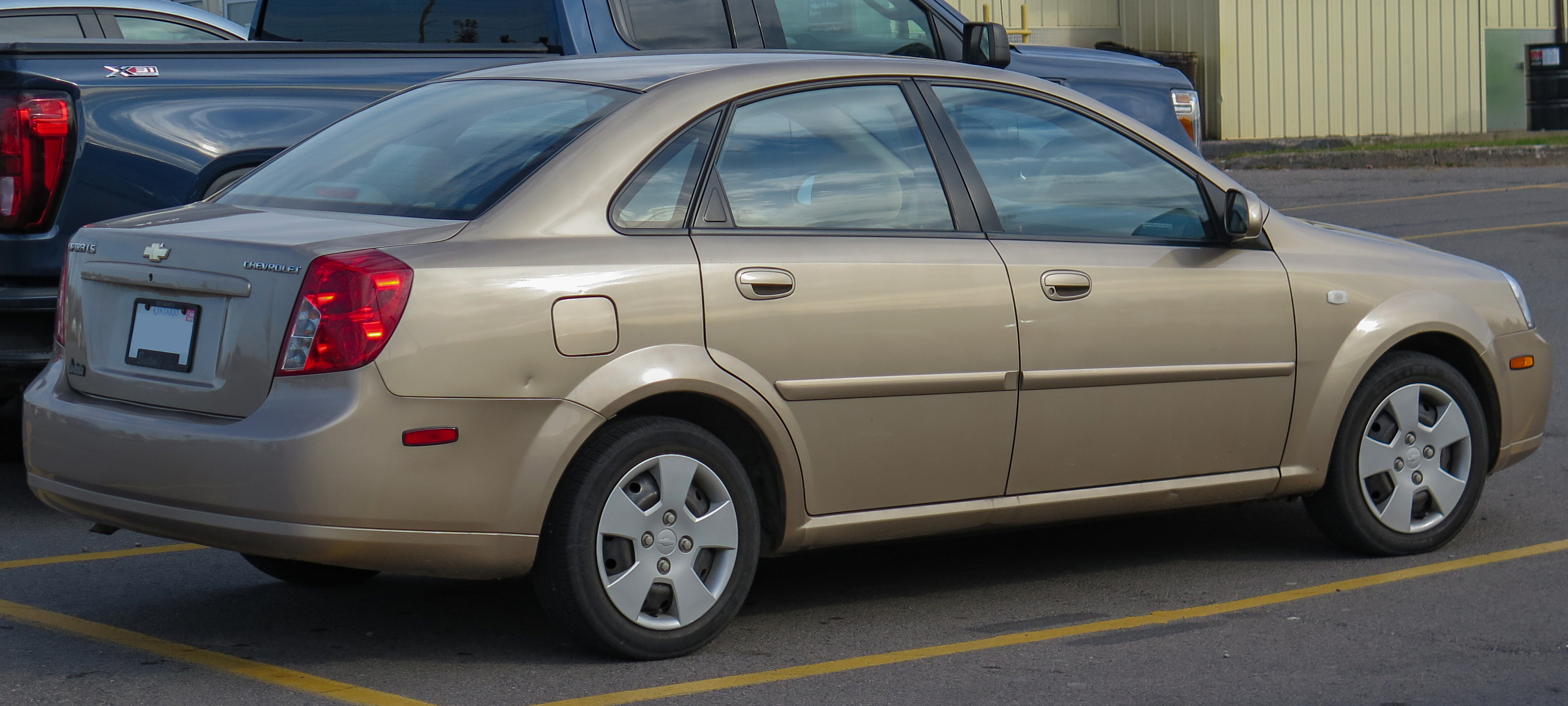
2005 Chevrolet Optra LS Sedan (United States and Canada, rear view)

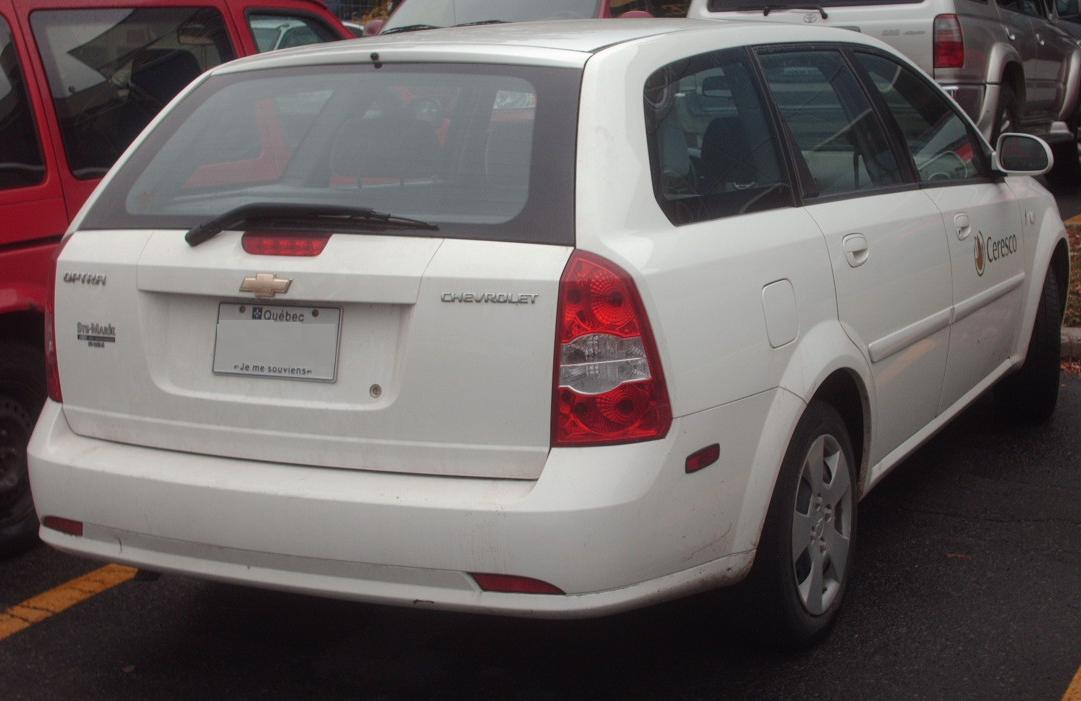
Chevrolet Optra wagon (United States and Canada)

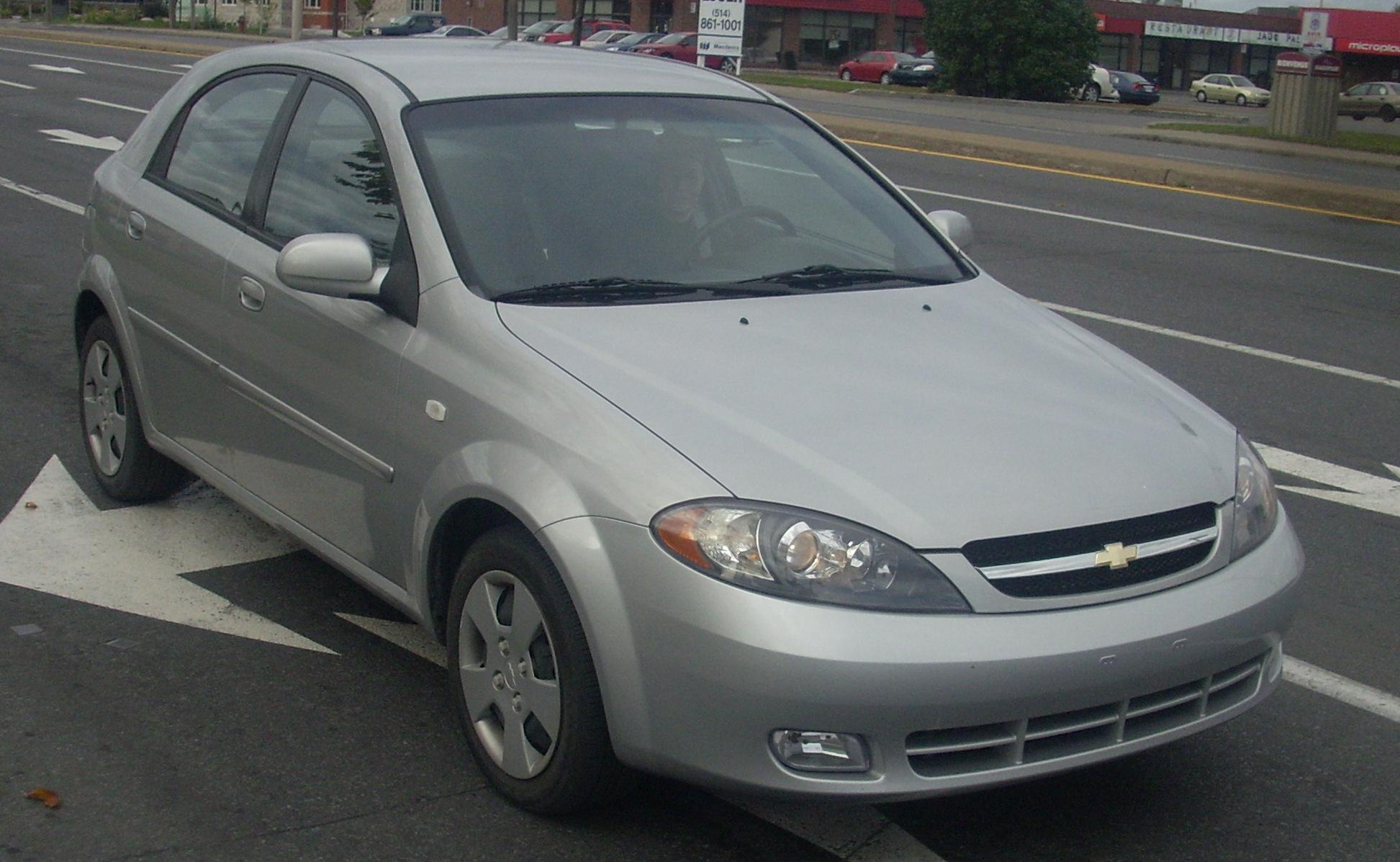
Chevrolet Optra5 hatchback (United States and Canada)

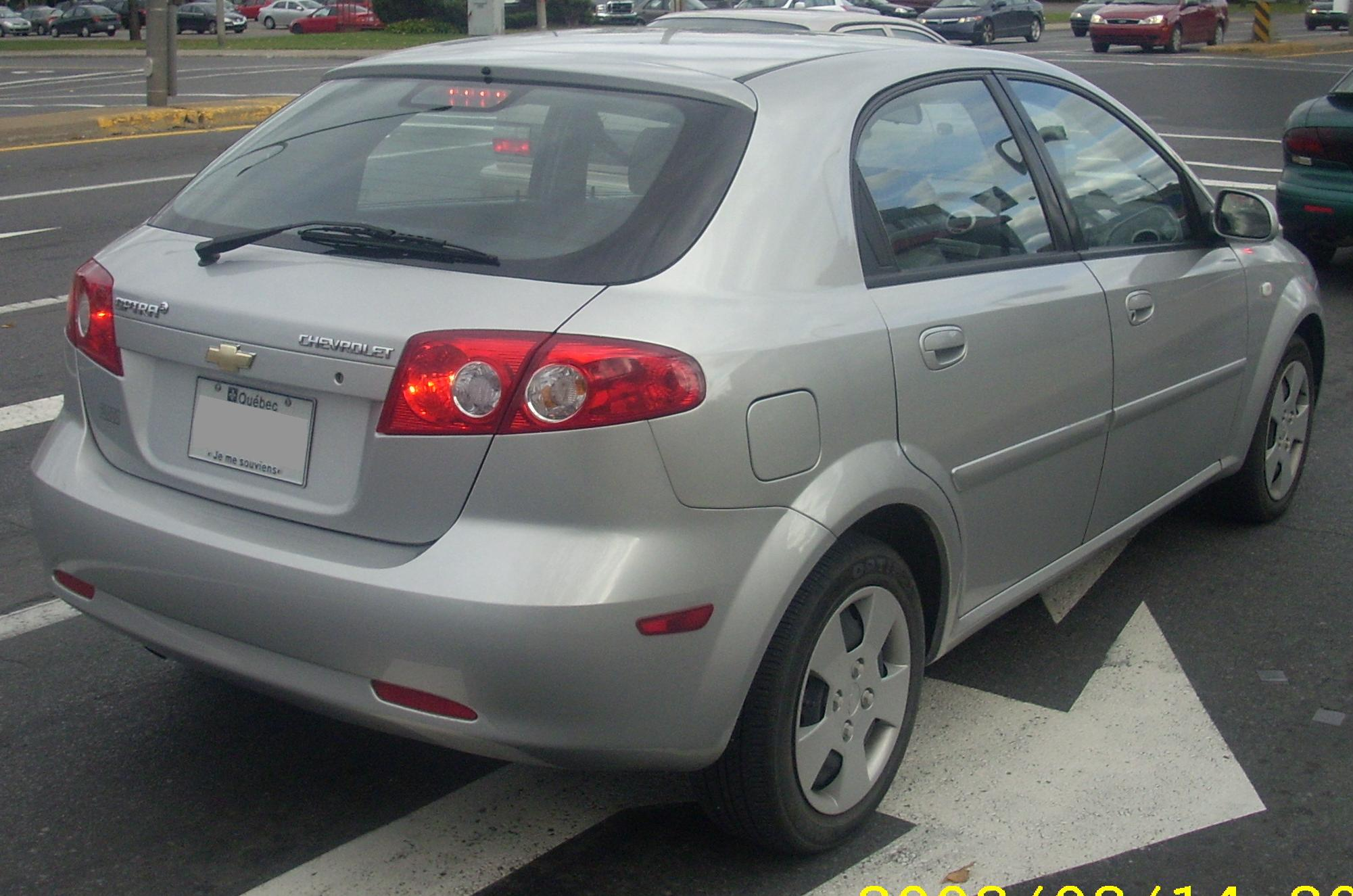
Chevrolet Optra5 hatchback (United States and Canada, rear view)

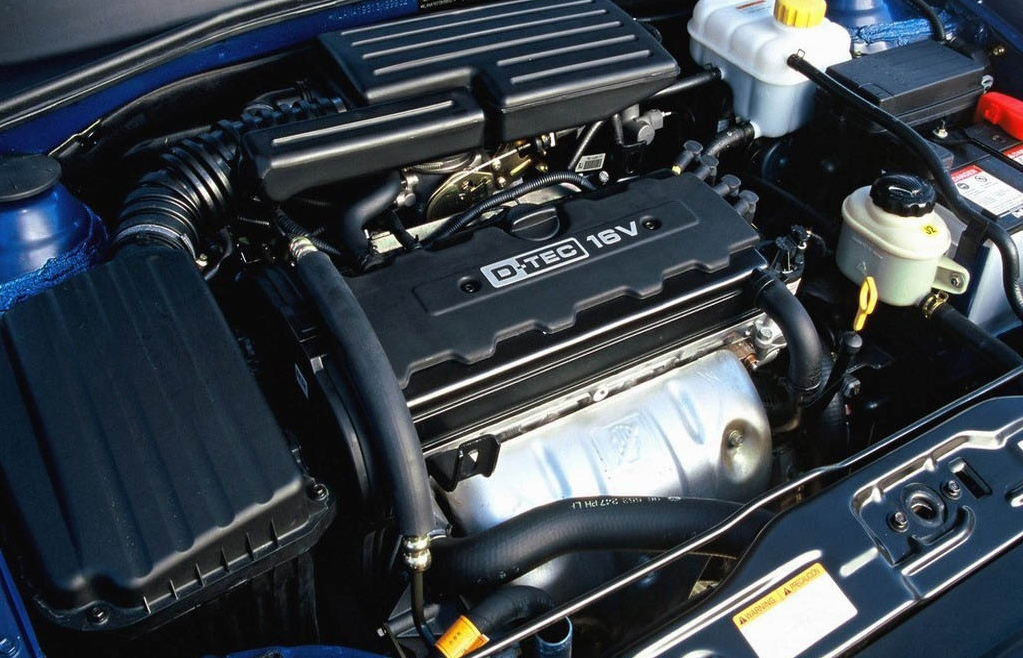
Engine: 4 CYL 2.0 DOHC MPI, 16 Valves

==== China ====
In China, the cars are marketed as the Buick Excelle sedan or wagon and Excelle HRV (hatchback). The sedan, which is also assembled in China, features an updated exterior.

The successor to the Daewoo Lacetti-based Buick Excelle is based on the global GM Delta II platform, like the Opel Astra and Chevrolet Cruze and their derivatives. The development center at the Opel plant in Rüsselsheim, Germany, leads the development of this platform. This second generation hatchback Buick Excelle XT, making its debut in 2009, is actually a replica of the Opel Astra hatchback adapted to Chinese conditions. The corresponding sedan (Excelle GT) made its debut in China in 2010. A version of this sedan for North America was introduced for model year 2012 as Buick Verano, and as Opel Astra sedan in other parts of the world. The Lacetti-based first generation (Excelle) sedan, however, continued to be produced for the Chinese market until 2016.

==== Europe ====
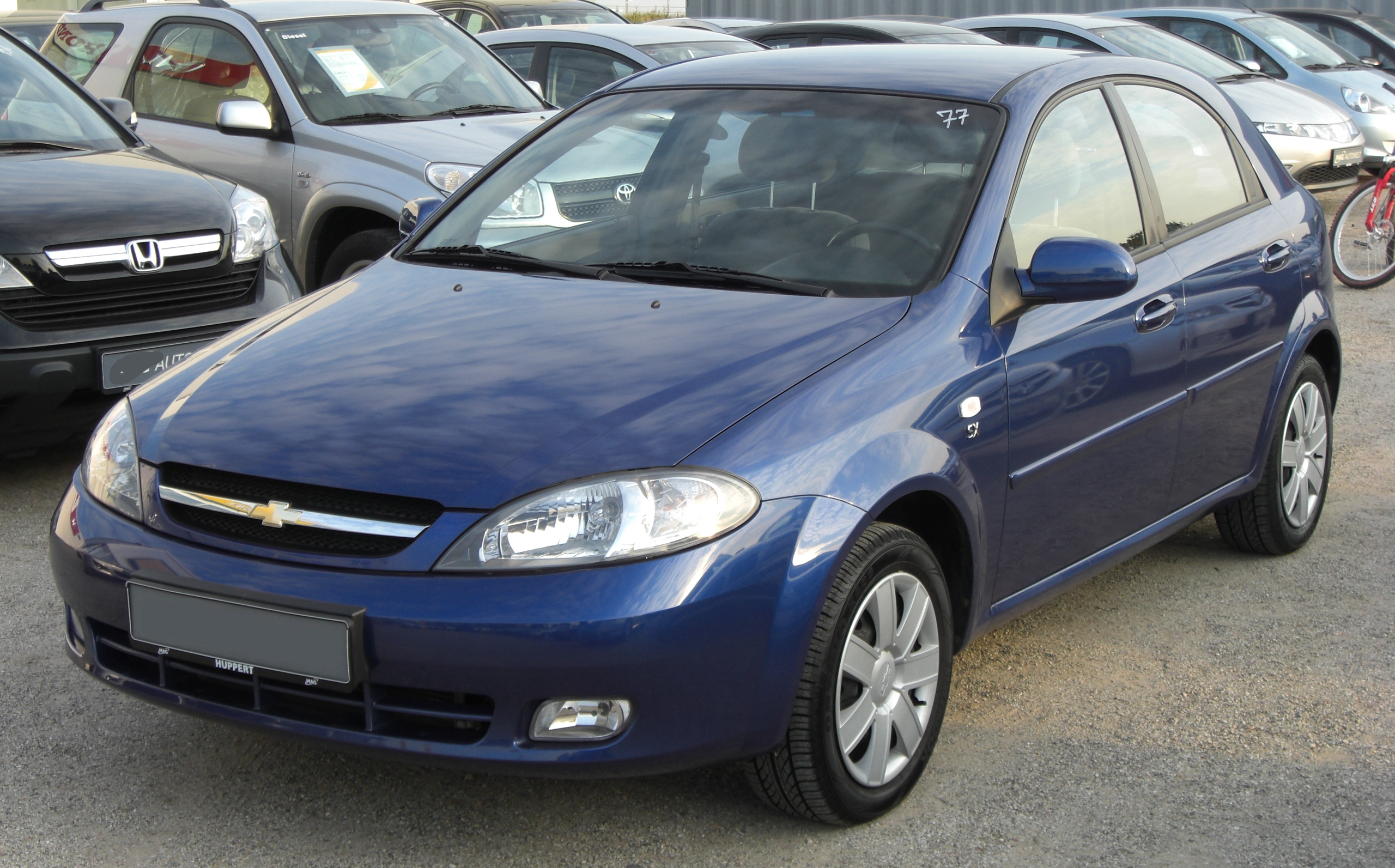
Chevrolet Lacetti hatchback (Germany)

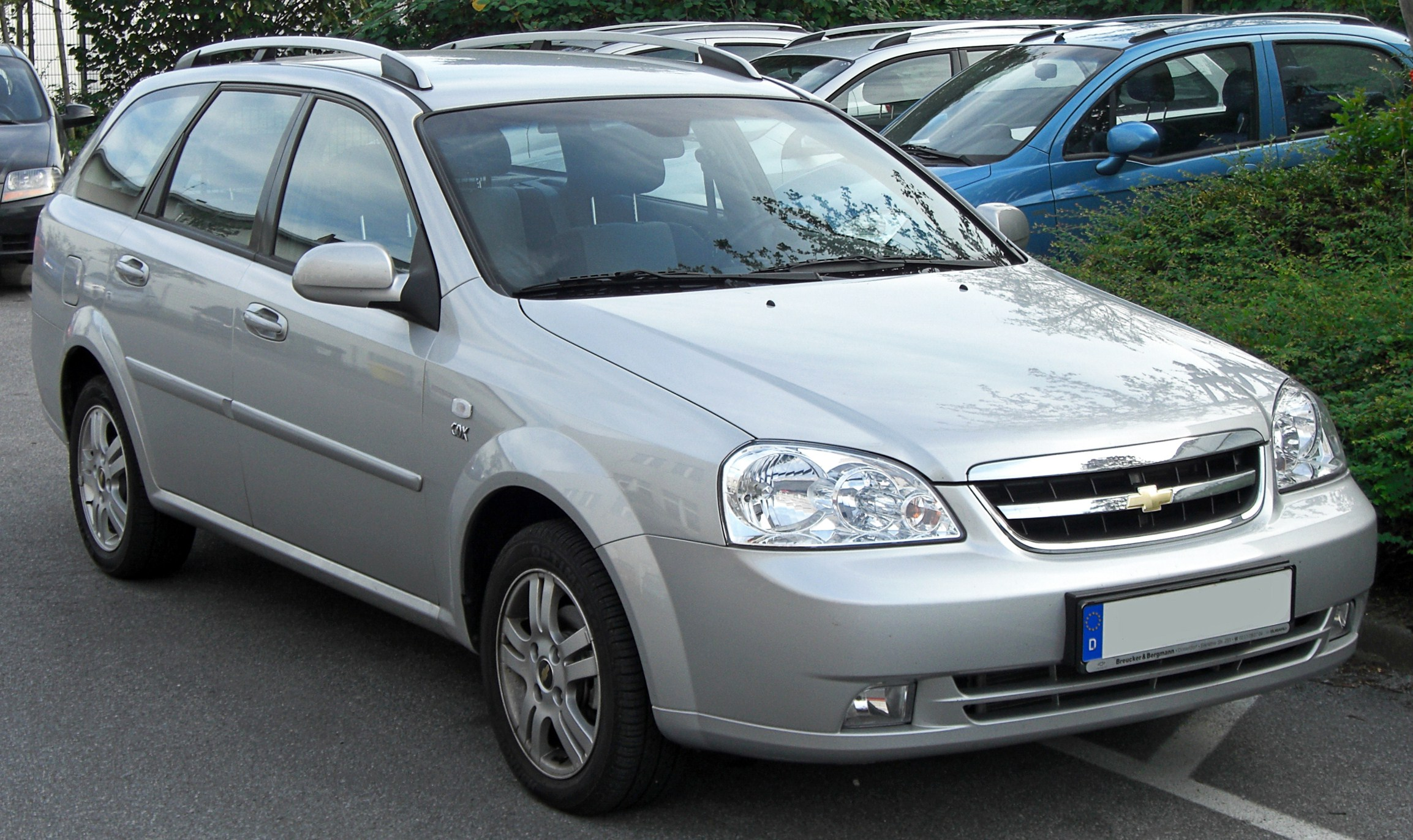
Chevrolet Nubira wagon (Germany)

In Europe, the car was initially sold as the Daewoo Nubira, with the production model being introduced at the 60th Frankfurt Motor Show in September 2003. However, by the end of 2004, it was rebadged Chevrolet Lacetti throughout the continent. As with its home market, in some European markets, the Lacetti name is also used for the entire range of sedan, station wagon and hatchback models on the same J-series platform. In Finland and Germany, for example, only the hatchback is sold under the Lacetti name.

The European models were initially only available with the following gasoline-powered four-cylinder engines:

- 1.4 L E-TEC II—95 PS (70 kW) at 6300 rpm
- 1.6 L Family 1—109 PS (80 kW) at 5800 rpm, 0–100 km/h (0–62 mph): 10.9 seconds (4-door) and 10.6 seconds (5-door), top speed: 186 km/h (116 mph) (4-door manual) and 184 km/h (114 mph) (5-door manual)
- 1.8 L Family II—121 PS (89 kW) at 5800 rpm
- 2.0 L D-TEC—121 PS (89 kW) at 5800 rpm
- 2.0 L DOHC—121 PS (89 kW), 0–100 km/h (0–62 mph): 9 seconds, top speed: 202 km/h (126 mph) (4-door manual)

A diesel-powered version was later added to the line-up with these specifications:

- 2.0-liter SOHC turbo-diesel engine, under VM Motori licence of RA 420 SOHC (see List of VM Motori engines), 121 PS (89 kW), 280 N⋅m (207 lb⋅ft) torque from 2000 rpm, 0–100 km/h (0–62 mph) in 9 seconds, 200 km/h (120 mph) top speed. This engine is available with five-speed manual and five-speed automatic.

In Europe, the sedan version was initially sold as the Daewoo Nubira. However, in late 2003, it was announced that Daewoo would be rebranded Chevrolet in some European markets. The Chevrolet Nubira went on sale in early 2004, initially only in Eastern Europe. When Daewoo was rebranded Chevrolet across Europe by the end of 2004, the Chevrolet Nubira was renamed Chevrolet Lacetti in some markets for the 2005 model year, which expanded the Lacetti line-up to include both the sedan and station wagon versions in addition to the five-door hatchback version, in line with Korea.

The engines built for the Nubira and its badge-engineered twins are the same as in the Lacetti hatchback and its badge-engineered versions. The 1.8-liter Family II four-cylinder engine is sourced from the Australian car maker Holden.

==== India ====
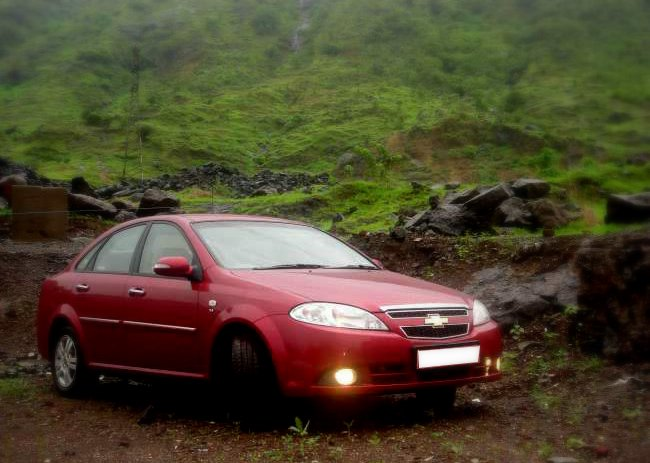
Chevrolet Optra Magnum (India)

In 2004, The Lacetti was launched in India and sold as the Optra and the sportsback version was sold as Optra S-RV (formerly known/sold as Chevrolet SRV), which the company planned to produce with a 2.0-liter diesel engine in the near future.

The 1.6-liter petrol produced 104 bhp (78 kW) and allowed a top speed of 177 km/h (110 mph), while the 1.8-liter petrol sibling was capable of producing 114 bhp (85 kW) and a limited top speed of 191 km/h (119 mph). However, the 1.8-liter automatic was capable of 176 km/h (109 mph).

In 2007 GM India introduced a facelifted diesel-engined Optra called the Optra Magnum. The Magnum sported the family nose, and better interiors as compared to the petrol version, also a new 2.0-liter TCDi engine capable of producing 121 bhp (90 kW). Subsequently the petrol version received the new nose treatment (as that of the Optra SRV, but with a slightly different front grille) and tail lights, and was sold as the Optra Magnum petrol.

The S-RV succumbed to competition from cheaper cars and was eventually discontinued in 2009. It had a 1.6-liter petrol engine with a maximum power output of 101 bhp (75 kW).

The Optra sedan continued selling in India until 2013.

==== Pakistan ====
Nexus Automotive, importers and assemblers of General Motors and Daewoo vehicles in Pakistan, sold the car as Chevrolet Optra. It was available in three variants: 1.6-liter SE and LS and the 1.8-liter CDX. SE trim models came with manual transmission only, whilst LS and CDX models came with five-speed manual or four-speed automatic transmissions. Sales however, were poor as Chevrolet was a recent entrant in Pakistan market without many dealerships and had to go through tough competition to compete against vetern existing competitor brands like Toyota, Honda & Suzuki which had dominated the country's auto-industry for decades. Also no such financial incentive was granted to Nexus Automotive from Pakistan Government as they were granted to other automobile importers & manufacturers. Hence the Optra and other Chevrolet vehicles were not sold in Pakistan for long.

==== Japan ====
In Japan, Suzuki briefly distributed the Lacetti as the Chevrolet Optra sedan and wagon. It was available in two trim levels, the LS and the LT. Both came with either a five-speed manual or 4-speed automatic transmission with a console shift. The Optra Wagon was powered by a 1.6 or 1.8-liter engine and filled a gap in Suzuki's lineup; they had not had a station wagon since the Cultus Wagon was discontinued in 2002. For model years 2004 and 2005 the Lacetti sedan was also sold in Japan as the Chevrolet Optra LT.

The official model codes for the two models were GH-NA19Z (sedan) and GH-NA35Z (wagons). The Optra was hindered in sales due to the exterior width exceeding 1,700 mm (66.9 in), thereby causing Japanese owners to pay a higher yearly tax for a vehicle that exceeds Japanese dimension regulations.

==== Mexico ====
In Mexico, the Lacetti came to the market in 2006 as Optra to replace the Chevrolet Cavalier, and it was sold only as a sedan. The Optra was phased out after the 2009 model year in favour of the Chevrolet Cruze, although for now, the Mexican Cruze is an imported model from South Korea.

==== Colombia ====
The Lacetti as a best seller was launched in Colombia, under the Chevrolet brand as Chevrolet Optra, in 2004 with the sedan version having the following engine options:

- 1.4 L GM Family I engine E-TEC II, 94 hp (70 kW) at 6300 rpm
- 1.8 L GM Family II engine D-TEC, 121 hp (90 kW) at 5800 rpm

In 2006 the hatchback version was introduced, with only the aforementioned 1.8-liter engine. By 2006, the 1.4-liter engine was replaced by the 1.6 L Family I E-TEC II, 109 hp (81 kW) at 5800 rpm. In addition, the design of wheels, and the grille were updated for all models offered.

The Vehicle was sold in LT and LTZ trims. LS trim wasn't available in the Colombian market.

In 2009, the saloon version received a facelift marketed as Chevrolet Optra Advance, with a sportier interior and front styling similar to that of the hatchback, it was sold with GM's 1.6 and 1.8 engines, with the 5 Speed Manual Transmission and 4 Speed Automatic Transmission. Assembly at the Bogotá GM plant (GM Colmotores) ceased in 2013 due to the modernization of GM Colmotores lineup.

==== South Africa ====
In South Africa, the Lacetti came to the market in 2004 as Chevrolet Optra, and it was sold only as a sedan. The Optra was one of the first models brought in when Chevrolet made its comeback into South Africa. The Optra was phased out after the 2009 model year in favour of the Chevrolet Cruze.

==== Southeast Asia ====
In Singapore, the name "Chevrolet" has replaced the Daewoo nameplate after GM bought Daewoo. It still offers the same line-up as did GM Daewoo, naming the Optra sedan, Optra station wagon and Optra5 hatchback in Malaysia, Thailand, and the Philippines. In Indonesia, the sedan is simply called Optra or Optra Magnum for the facelift model, and Estate for the station wagon. The vehicles use the 1.6- or 1.8-liter engine with an automatic transmission option for selected models.

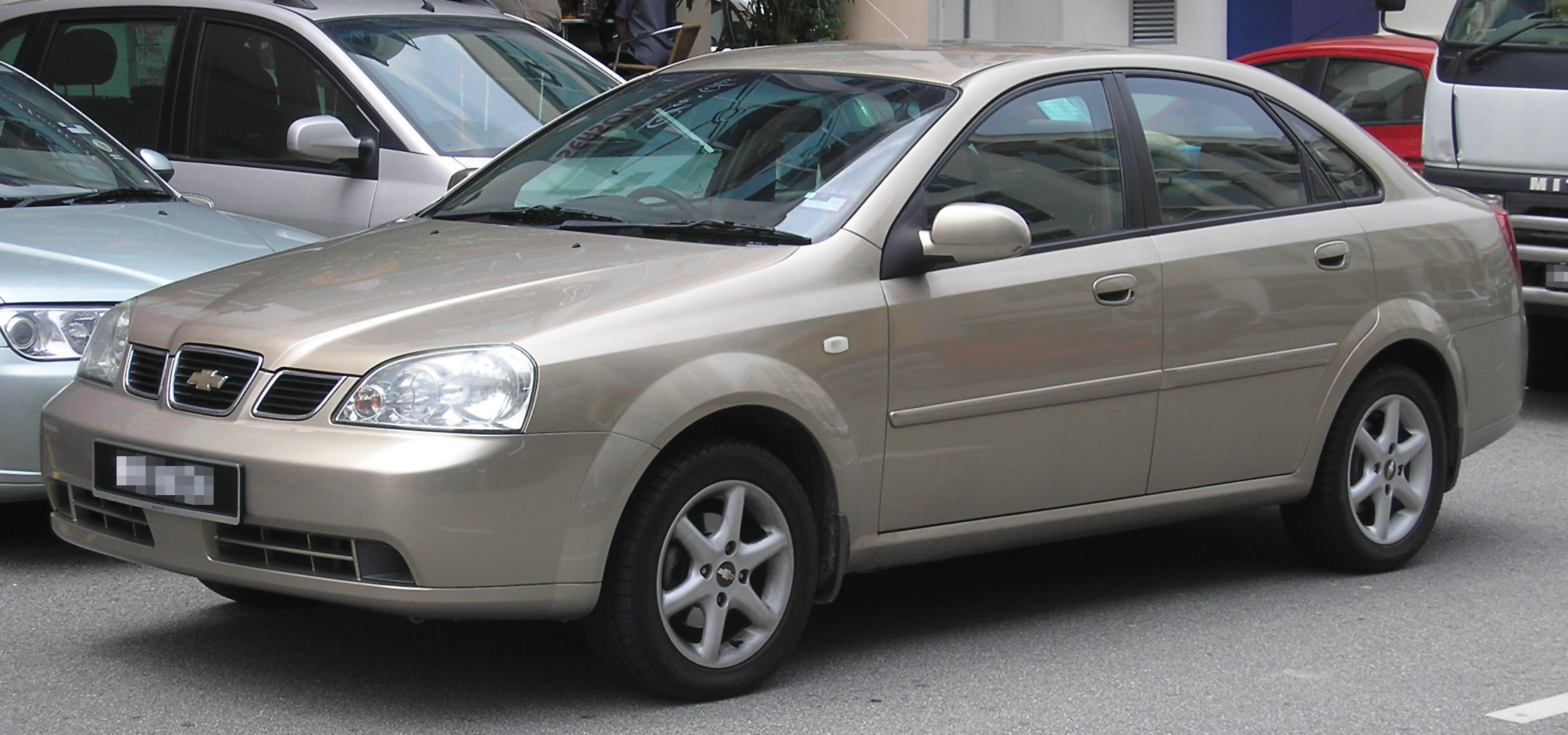
Chevrolet Optra sedan (pre-facelift, Malaysia)

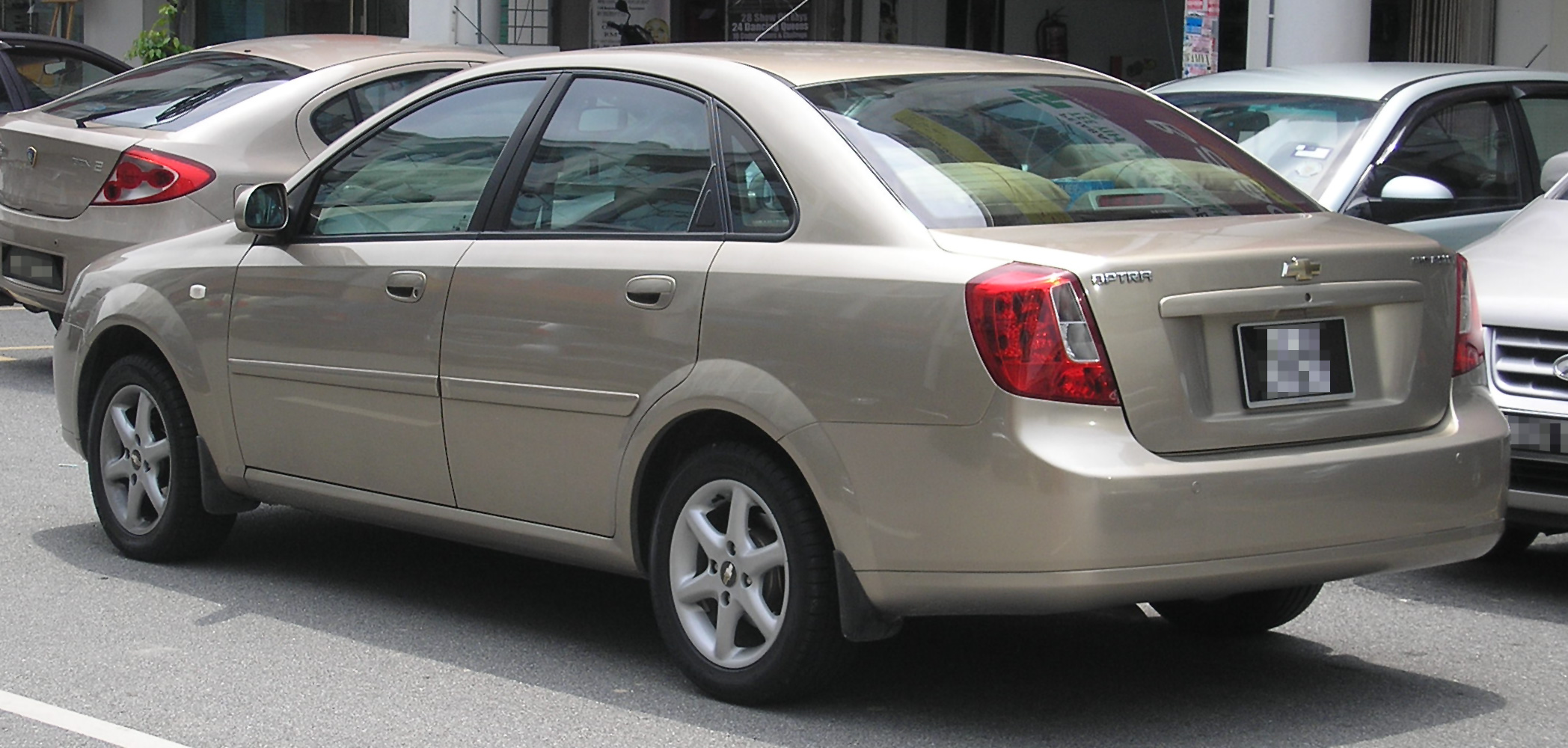
Chevrolet Optra sedan (pre-facelift, Malaysia)

==== Ukraine ====
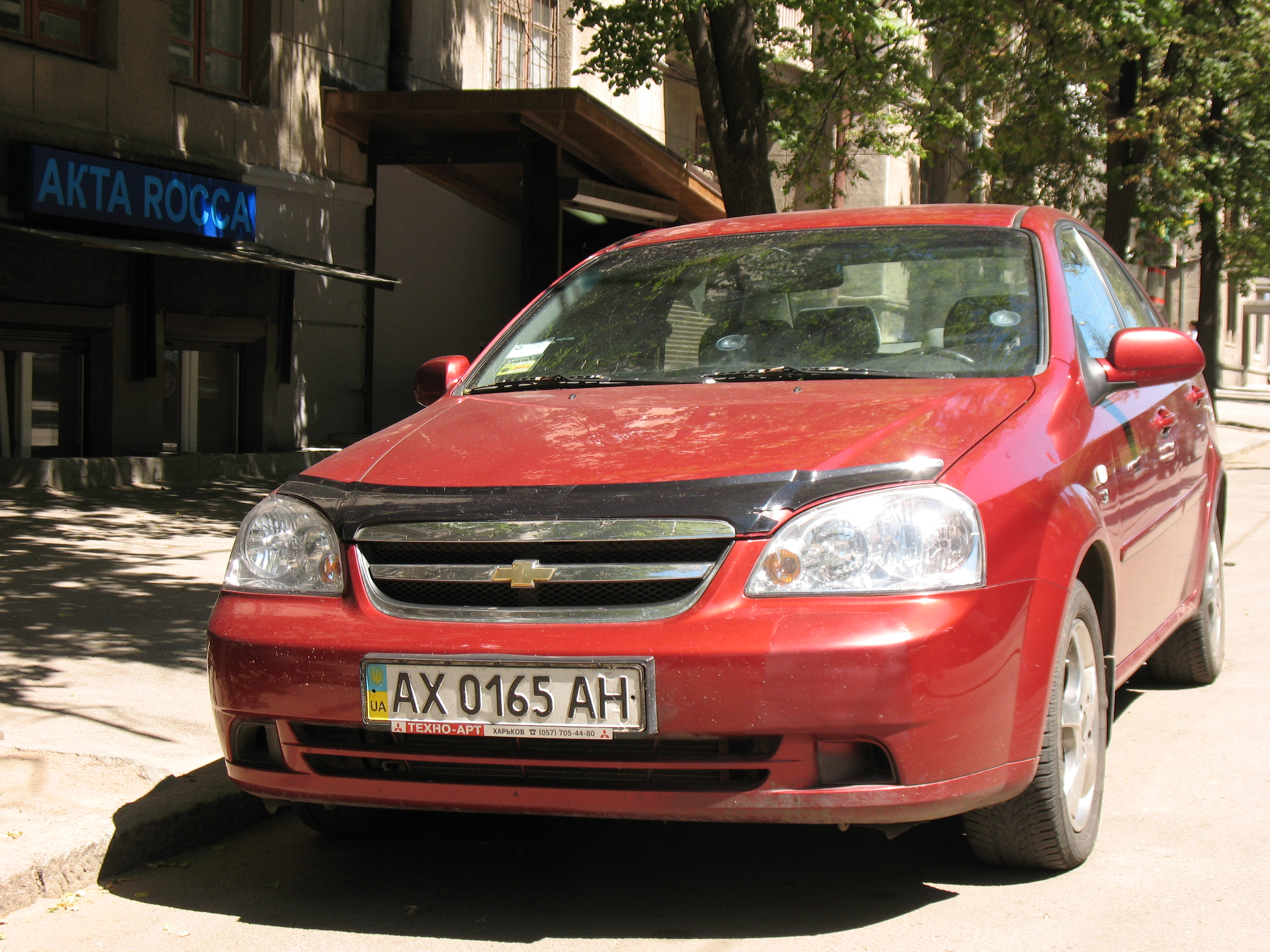
2012 Chevrolet Lacetti in Kharkiv

In Ukraine, the car went on sale in 2004, with all three body styles introduced under a single name, Chevrolet Lacetti. That same year, the car began to be assembled at the Chornomorsk Auto Assembly Plant using South Korean knocked-down kits.

The following 4-cylinder petrol engines were officially available in Ukraine:

- 1.6L E-TEC II — 109 hp at 5800 rpm. It was offered in the "SE" trim level with sedan and hatchback body styles.
- 1.8L E-TEC II — 122 hp at 5800 rpm, which was later (March 2007) replaced by the E-TEC III (LDA) — 122 hp at 5800 rpm.

It was offered in the "SX" and "CDX" trim levels with sedan, hatchback, and station wagon body styles.The "SE" and "SX" trim levels come with a manual transmission, while the "CDX" trim features an automatic transmission.

Vehicles equipped with 1.4-liter and 2.0-liter engines were not sold in Ukraine.

==== United States ====
Suzuki marketed a rebadged Lacetti as the Forenza and Reno beginning in the United States in 2004—following the end of Daewoo's North American operations in 2002 and replacing the Daewoo Nubira station wagon and sedan. The Forenza/Reno falls between the Aerio (later SX4) and the now-discontinued Verona. In the territories of Guam and Northern Mariana Islands, it was sold as a Chevrolet Optra, but it was only available as a sedan.

The US model line features the 2.0-liter four-cylinder D-TEC made by General Motors, developing a maximum power of 132 hp (98 kW) at 5600 rpm.

The Forenza and the Reno were discontinued during the 2008 model year, the Reno being replaced by the Suzuki SX4 sedan after the 2008 model year and the Forenza by the Chevrolet Cruze.

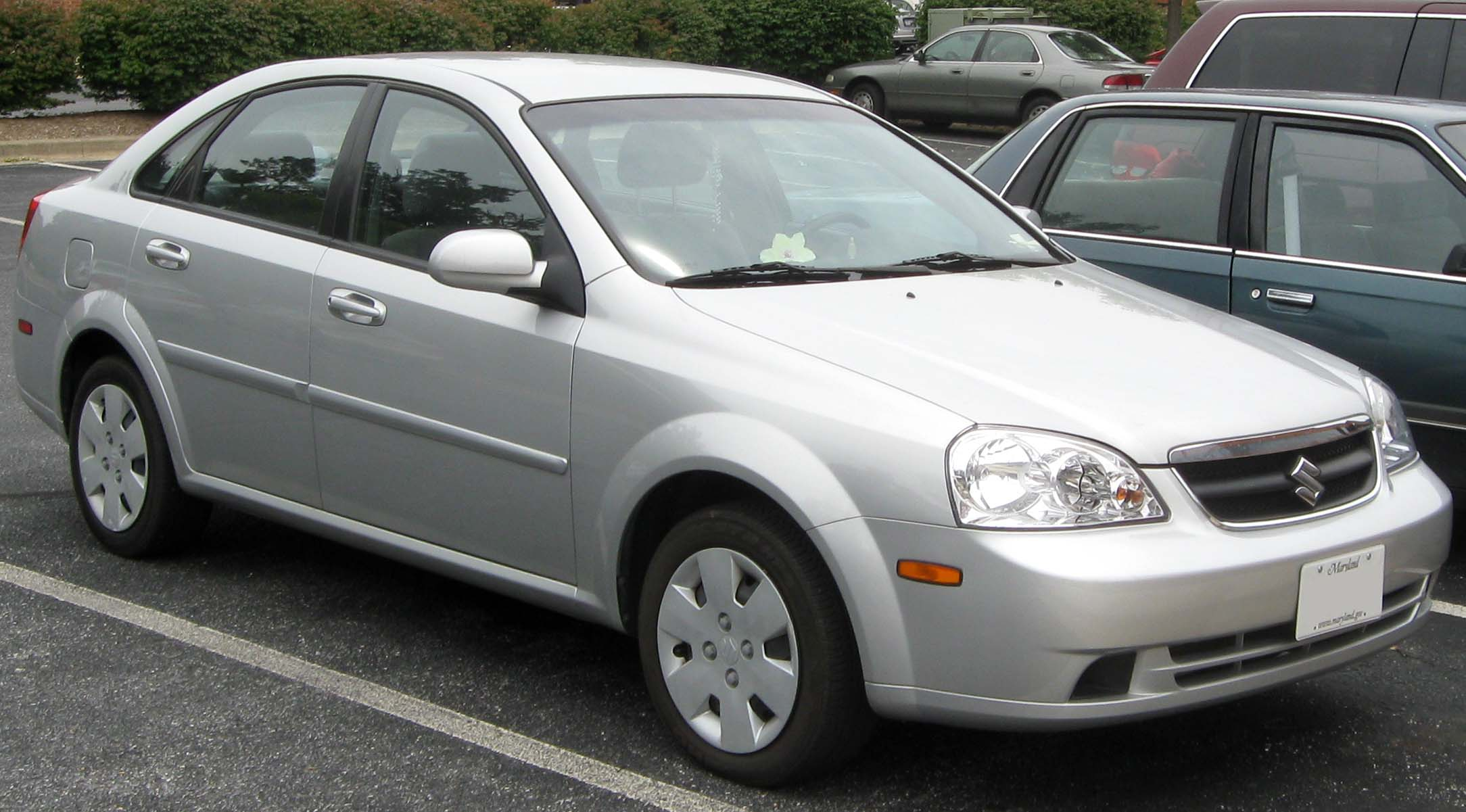
Suzuki Forenza sedan (facelift)

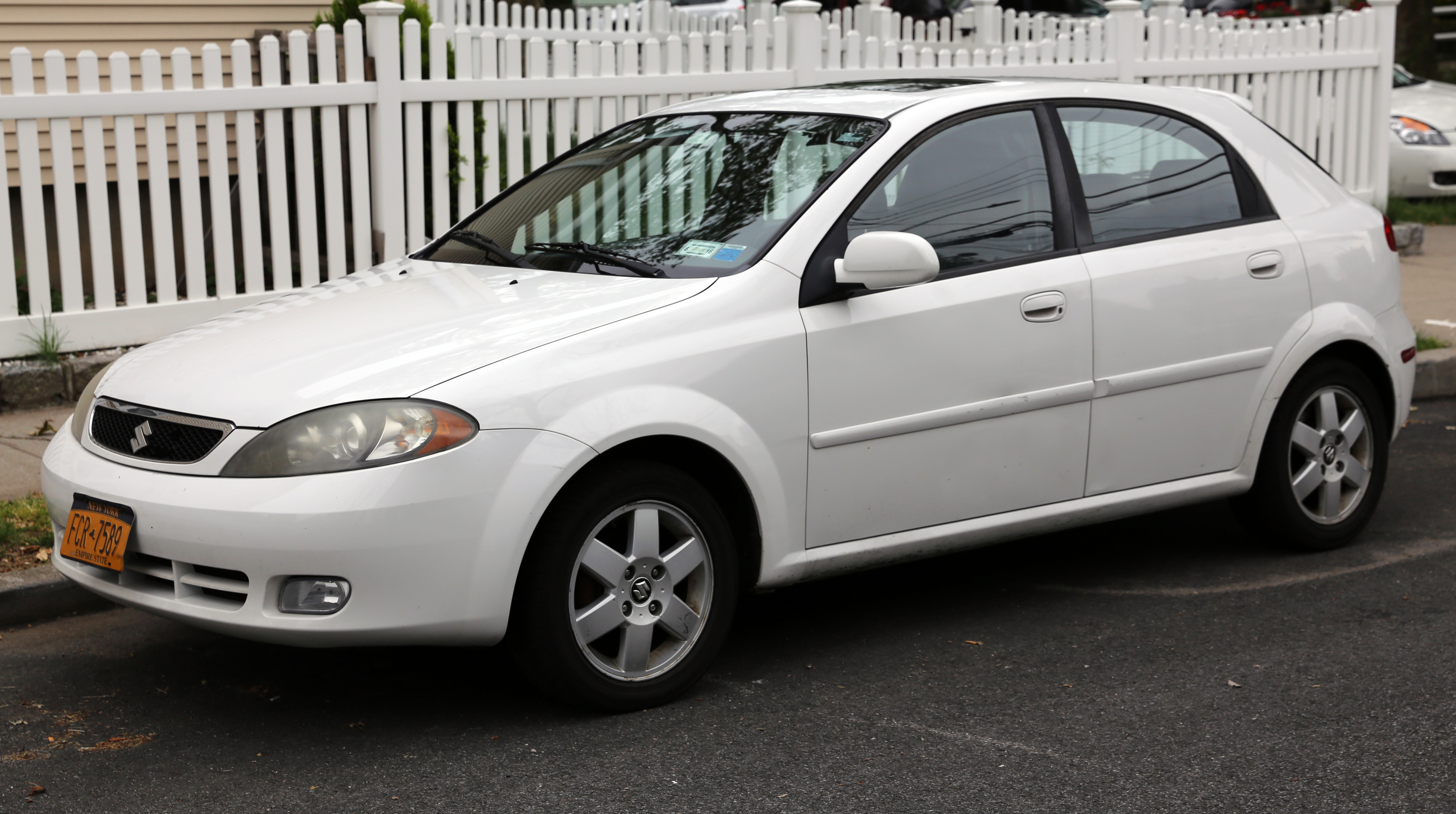
Suzuki Reno

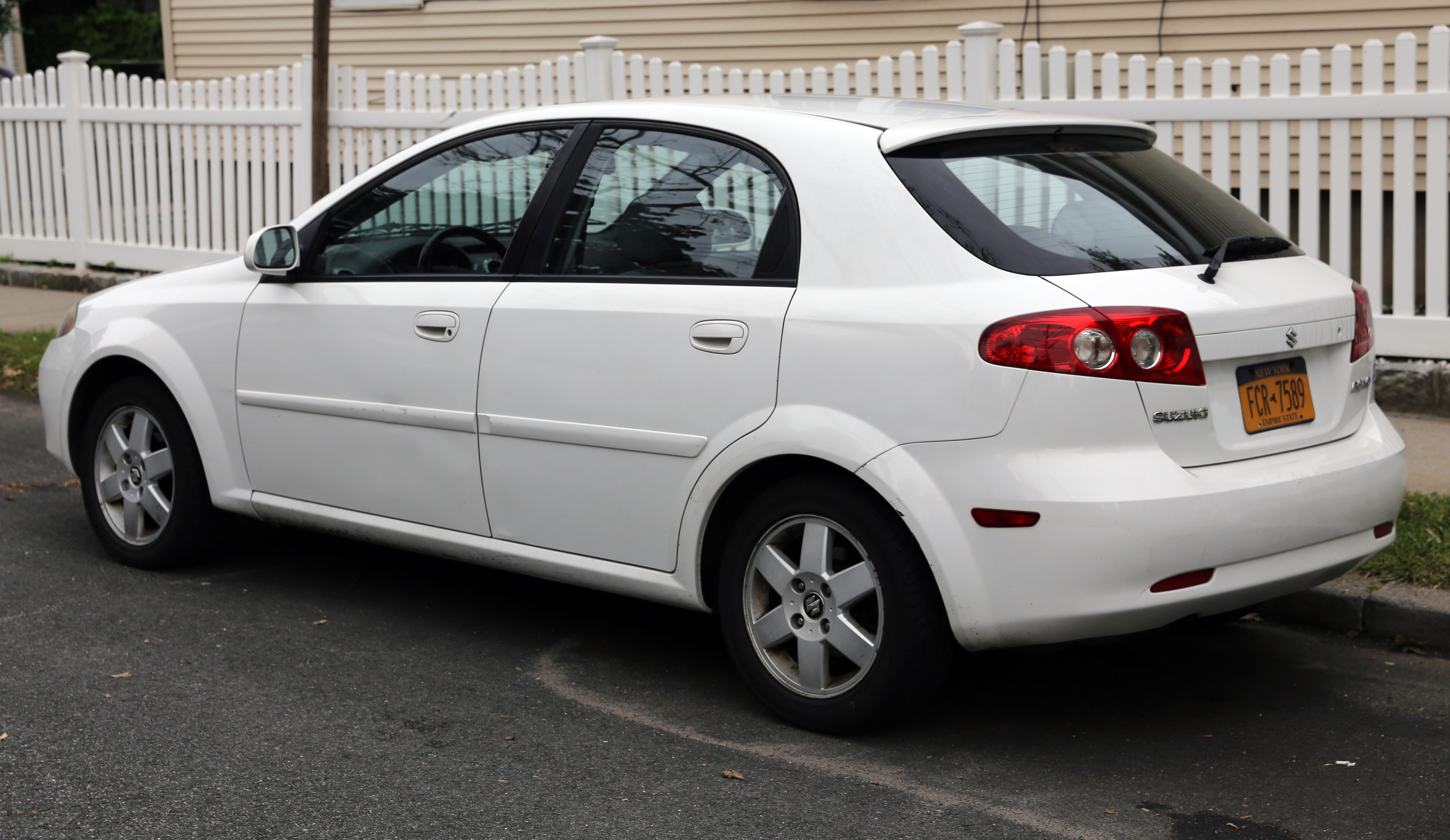
Suzuki Reno

==== Iraq ====
The Chevrolet Optra entered the Iraqi market in 2004 with the 1.6-liter engine; a few years later the LS term version was used as a traffic police patrol vehicle.

==== Uzbekistan ====
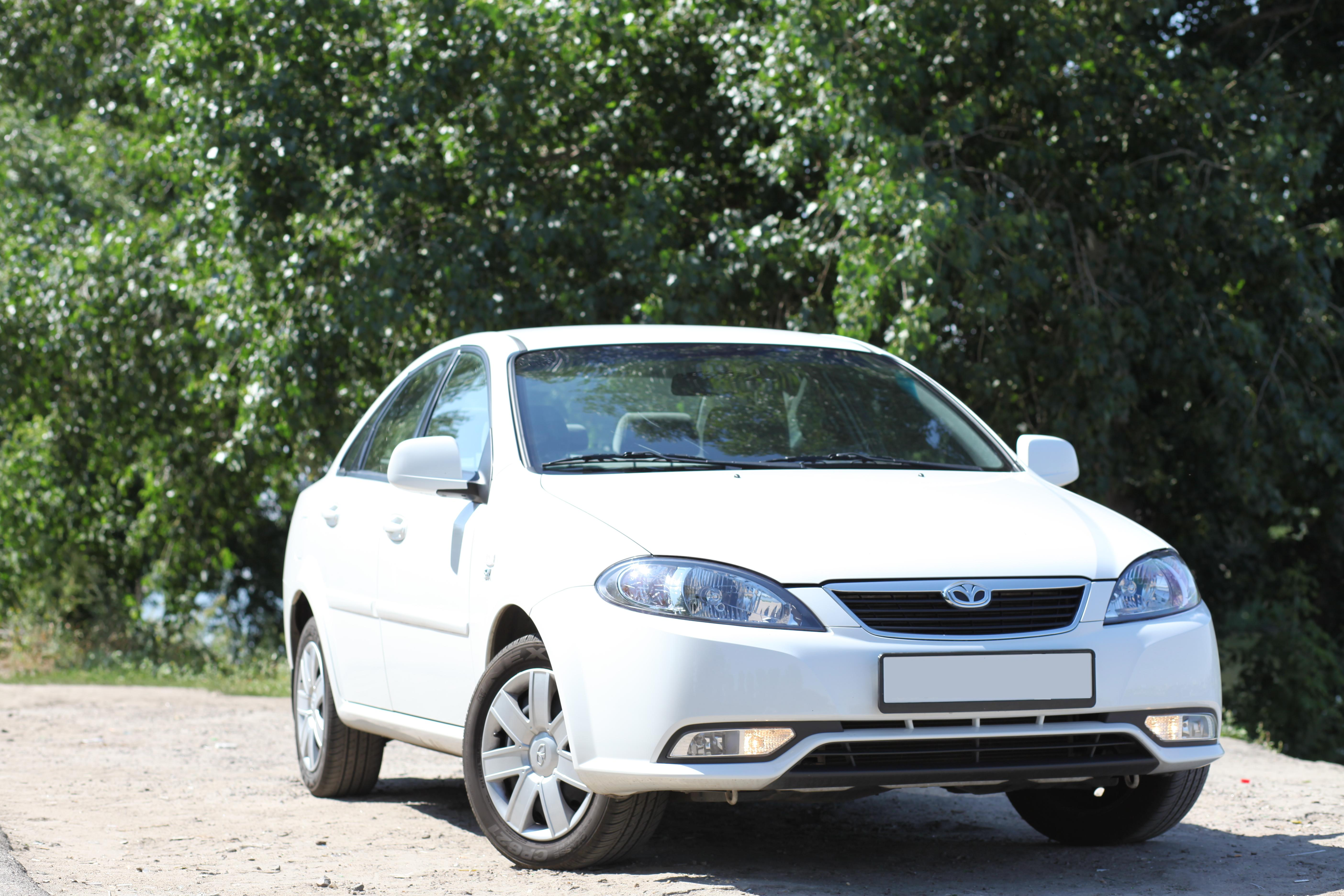
2013 Daewoo Gentra (facelift)

In Uzbekistan, the Lacetti has been produced by GM Uzbekistan since 2008, in a plant located in Asaka, and marketed as the Chevrolet Lacetti. In 2013, the partner company Uz-Daewoo Avto began producing the facelifted sedan version as the new Daewoo Gentra. It is marketed throughout the CIS countries. In 2015 the car was renamed the "Ravon Gentra".

After UzAuto phased out the Ravon brand in 2020, the Ravon Gentra/R5 was renamed again as Chevrolet Lacetti. The Chevrolet Lacetti received the same facelift of the Daewoo Gentra. On July 26, 2024, the last Chevrolet Lacetti left the UzAuto plant.

==== Russia ====
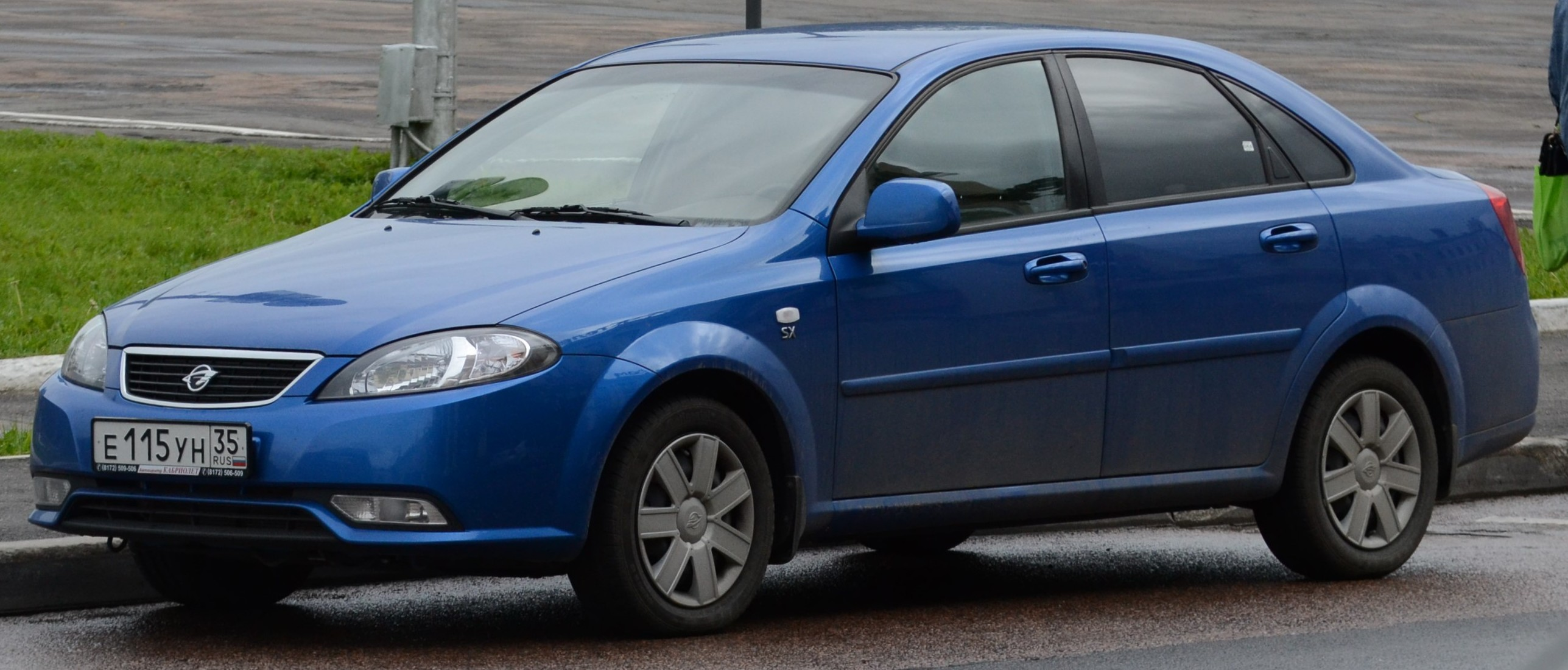
Ravon Gentra

It was sold as the Chevrolet Lacetti and includes 5-door hatchback, sedan and station wagon models. The entire line of models were produced at the Avtotor plant in Kaliningrad with full cycle of manufacturing until 2012.

In 2014, UzDaewoo, GM's subdivision in Uzbekistan, started importing the Lacetti sedan as Daewoo Gentra. After license agreement between GM and Daewoo ended, UzDaewoo (now GM Uzbekistan) re-branded all of its lineup as Ravon, due to impossibility of using both Daewoo and Chevrolet names in Russia (Chevrolet withdrew from the Russian market in early 2015 due to the economic crisis).

The Russian models are available with the following gasoline-powered four-cylinder engines:

- 1.4 L: 95 hp; manual; not available for station wagon
- 1.6 L: 110 hp; automatic and manual (wagon is manual only)
- 1.8 L: 122 hp; automatic and manual (wagon is manual only)

In 2020, the Ravon Gentra was discontinued along with the whole Ravon Brand in Russia.

=== Safety ===
ANCAP test results* Holden Viva 5 door hatch (2005)
Test	Score
Overall	4 /5 stars
Frontal offset	11.34/16
Side impact	11.75/16
Pole	2/2
Seat belt reminders	0/3
Whiplash protection	Not Assessed
Pedestrian protection	Marginal
Electronic stability control	Not Available

== Second generation (J300; 2008) ==
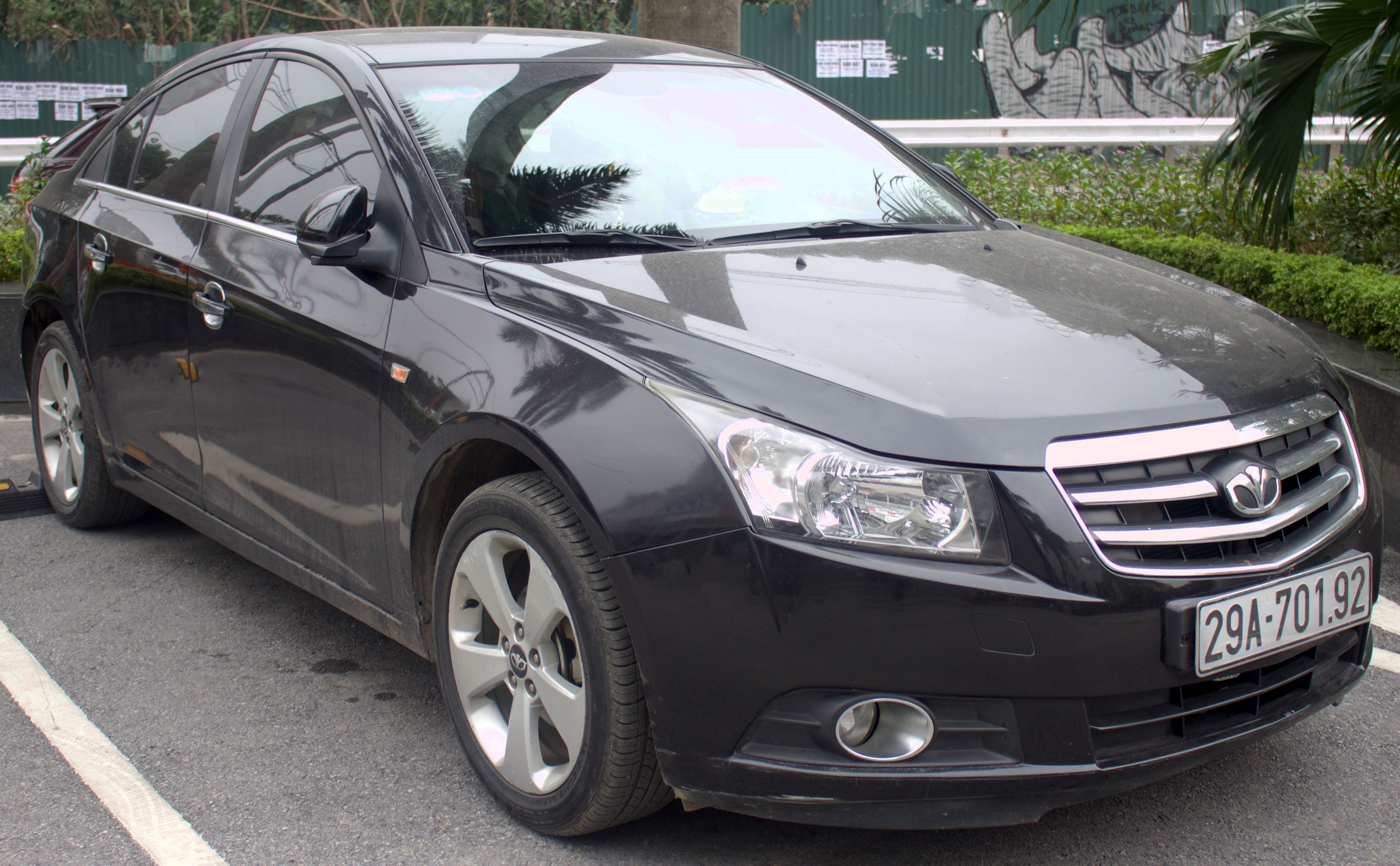
Daewoo Lacetti Premiere

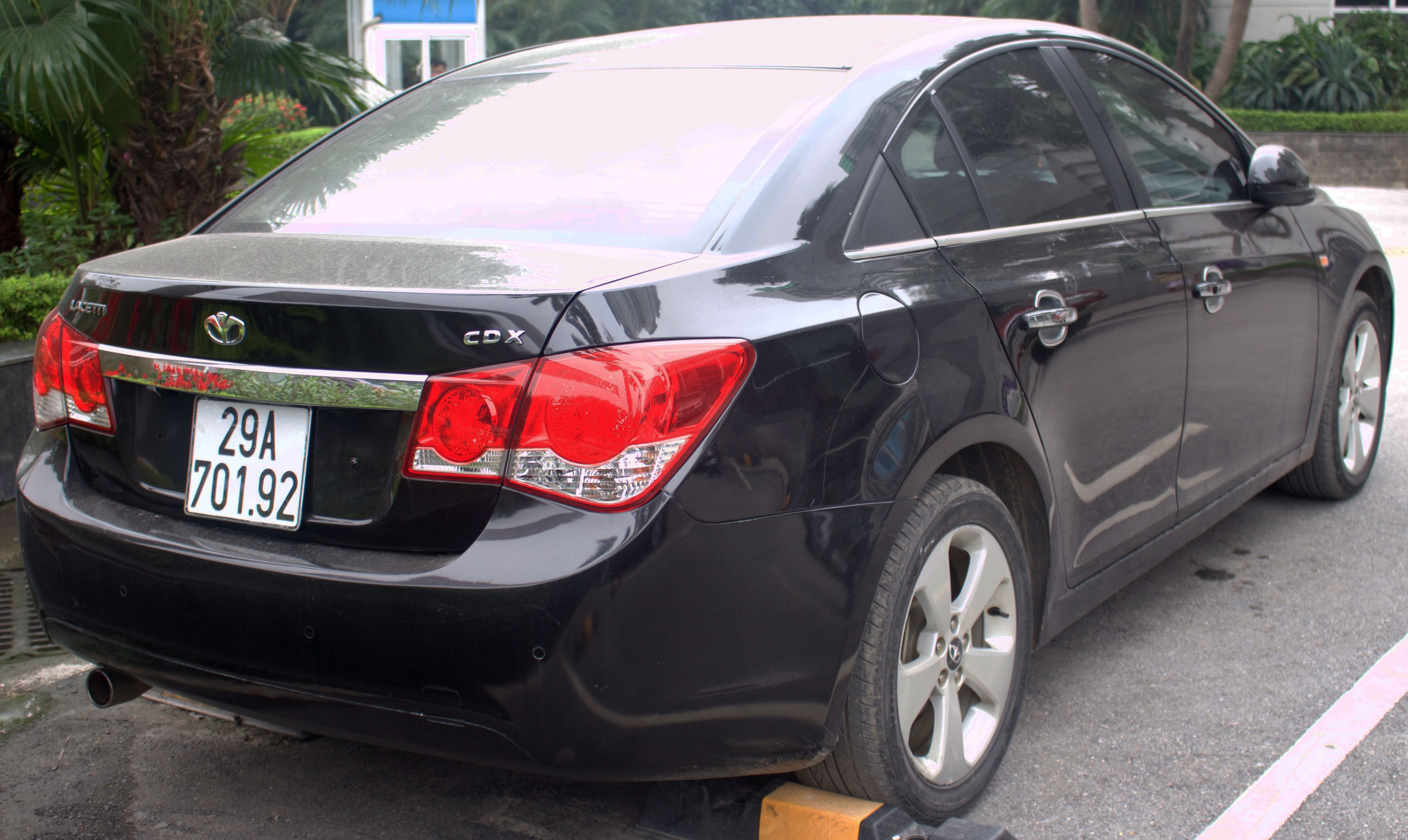
Daewoo Lacetti Premiere

The second-generation, built on the GM Delta II platform, is sold in most markets as the Chevrolet Cruze. In South Korea it was originally branded as the Daewoo Lacetti Premiere, until the Daewoo brand was replaced by Chevrolet in 2011.

For the Chinese successor of the Lacetti-based Buick Excelle, see Buick Excelle XT and Buick Excelle GT, which are twins of the Opel Astra J hatchback and sedan respectively.

Chinese versions also included the new SAIC-GM-Wuling joint venture called Baojun 630 manufactured in Liuzhou, Guangxi, China. It was launched at the 2011 Shanghai Auto Show, and went on sale in August 2011.

== Motorsport ==
The car has been used in the FIA's World Touring Car Championship from 2005 until 2012, and in the British Touring Car Championship from 2008 until 2011.

== Sales ==
Year	Mexico
2006	10,444
2007	21,798
2008	16,828
2009	10,518
2010	2,954

== Media ==
The Chevrolet Lacetti was chosen as the new "reasonably-priced car" for Top Gear's "Star in a Reasonably-Priced Car" segment for series 8 in 2006, replacing the Suzuki Liana, which had ceased production. In this segment of the show, celebrity guests set timed laps of the Top Gear test track driving the Lacetti.

In the first episode of series 15 of Top Gear, broadcast on BBC2 on 27 June 2010, the Lacetti, that had been used for the power laps, was given a "Viking Burial" by presenter Richard Hammond. An industrial chimney was demolished, collapsing over and partially burying the car under rubble. Soon afterwards, the new reasonably priced car, a Kia Cee'd, was unveiled to viewers.
