= Daewoo Gentra =

The Daewoo Gentra is an automotive nameplate used by the South Korean automobile brand Daewoo. The marque has utilized the "Gentra" name on two different vehicles—a subcompact model sold in South Korea between 2005 and 2011—and a compact car offered in Uzbekistan by Uz-Daewoo Auto since 2013. The Uzbekistani car was renamed Ravon Gentra in 2015.

== South Korea (2005 - 2011) ==
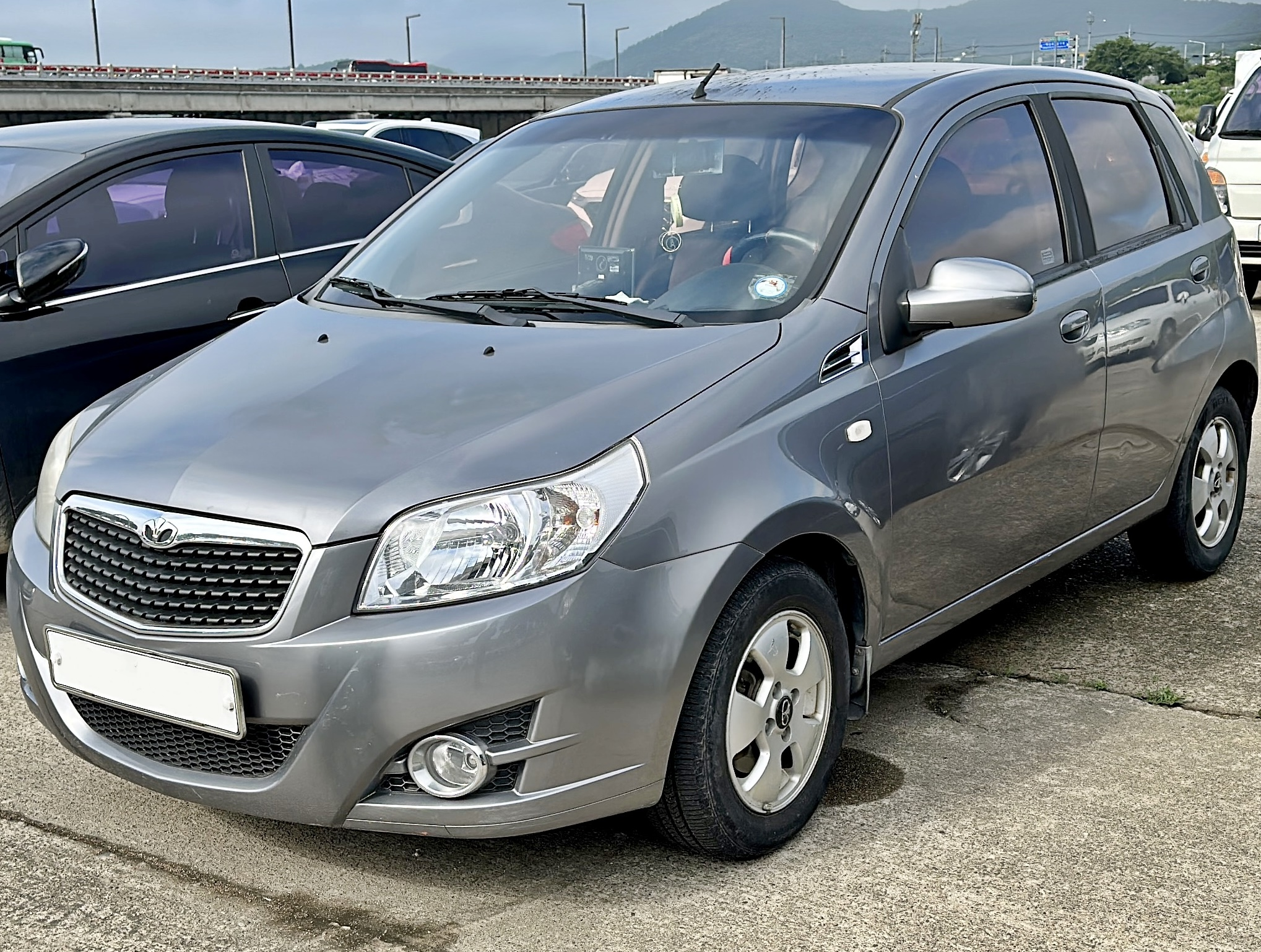
Daewoo Gentra X (South Korea)

The Daewoo Gentra is a subcompact car originally produced by the South Korean manufacturer GM Daewoo between 2005 and 2011. The nameplate was applied to the facelifted version of the Daewoo Kalos sedan (with the Daewoo Gentra X nameplate applied to the facelifted hatchback) and was used only in South Korea and Vietnam, in the rest of the world the model being prominently marketed as the Chevrolet Aveo.

== Uzbekistan (2013 – 2015) ==
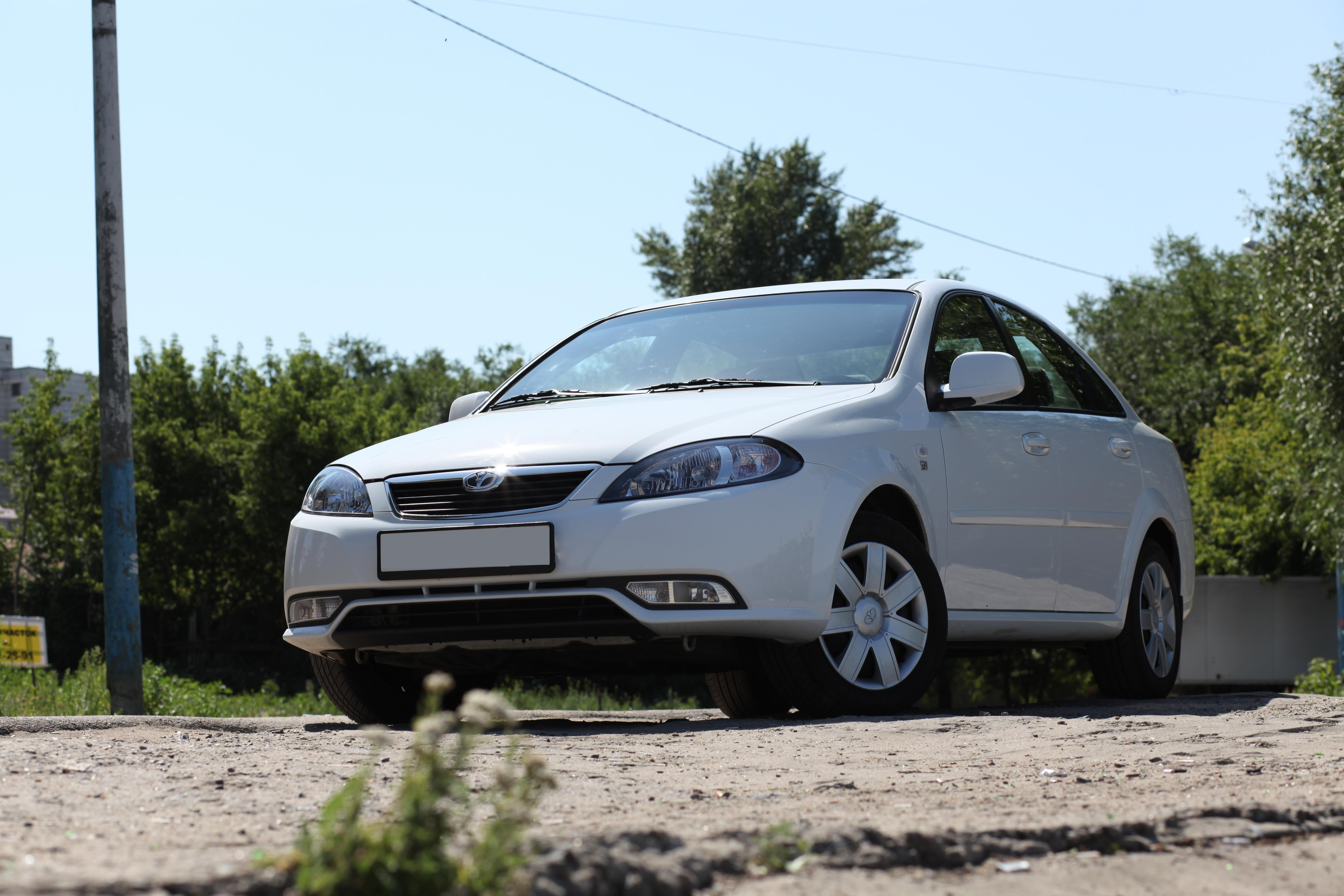
Daewoo Gentra (Uzbekistan)

The nameplate has also been used by the Uzbekistan-based manufacturer Uz-DaewooAuto between the middle of 2013 and late 2015 for a version of the first generation of the Daewoo Lacetti, marketed throughout the CIS states. Uzbekistan-made Daewoo Gentras are fitted with a 1.5-liter engine capable of 107 hp (80 kW) paired with a five-speed manual or six-speed automatic transmission.

In October 2015, the Uz-Daewoo brand was replaced with the Ravon brand, thus the model became the Ravon Gentra.
